= Cher albums discography =

Recording collections by American singer

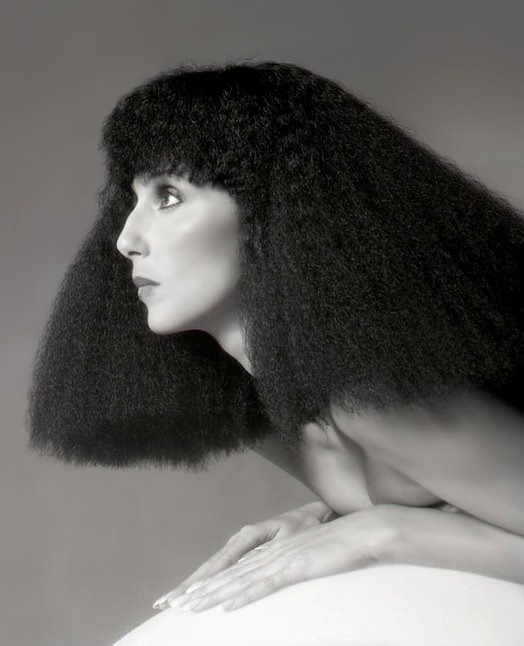
- 1978 publicity photo of Cher
- Studio albums: 27
- Soundtrack albums: 4
- Live albums: 3
- Compilation albums: 11
- Video albums: 5

American entertainer Cher has released 27 studio albums, 11 compilation albums, four soundtrack albums, and three live albums. Widely recognized as the "Goddess of Pop", Cher has sold over 100 million records worldwide (as a solo artist) and a further 40 million as part of Sonny & Cher, making her one of the best-selling female recording artists in history. Billboard ranked her as the 109th Greatest Artist of all time and the 49th Greatest Hot 100 Artist of all time. According to RIAA, she has sold 12.5 million albums (including three multi-platinum, four platinum and nine gold records) in the United States. Her signature hit "Believe" has sold more than 11 million copies worldwide, and it is the UK's best-selling single by a female artist in history, and one of the best-selling physical singles of all time.

In 1964 Cher signed a recording contract with Imperial Records, a label owned by Liberty Records. After the success of her first major single, Bob Dylan's "All I Really Want to Do" she and her then-husband Sonny Bono worked on her first album All I Really Want to Do released in 1965. The album peaked at number 16 on the Billboard 200 and at number seven on the UK Albums Chart. After the massive success of "I Got You Babe" the record label encouraged her to record the second album, The Sonny Side of Chér (1966). The record peaked within the top 30 in several countries. Chér (1966) and With Love, Chér (1967) were less successful on the music charts. Backstage and her first official compilation album Cher's Golden Greats (1968) her last efforts with Imperial were critically and commercially unsuccessful. In 1969 Cher signed with Atco Records and released two albums: the critically acclaimed 3614 Jackson Highway and her first soundtrack album Chastity for the film of the same name; both of them were a commercial failure.

Cher entered the 1970s with the release of the album Gypsys, Tramps & Thieves (1971), released under the label Kapp Records later absorbed by the MCA Records. The record proved to be critically and commercially successful peaking at number 16 on the Billboard 200 and was certified gold by the Recording Industry Association of America (RIAA); her first solo album to do so. Next year she followed it with her less successful eighth studio album Foxy Lady. In 1973 she released two records: Bittersweet White Light (which was the last album produced by Sonny Bono) and Half-Breed her second gold album in the United States. Dark Lady was released as her 11th studio album in 1974 and was less successful on the music charts. After the separation with Sonny she signed a new $2.5 million recording contract and business deal with Warner Bros. Records. From 1975 to 1977 she released a string of critic and commercial failures: Stars, I'd Rather Believe in You, Cherished and Two the Hard Way (the latter with her then husband Gregg Allman) which is considered the lowest point of her career. In 1979 she signed with Casablanca Records and released her 15th album: Take Me Home, which was certified gold in the United States. Prisoner (1979) was less successful than its predecessor. In the beginning of the 1980s, Cher formed a band called the "Black Rose" and released their first and only album Black Rose. In 1982 Columbia Records released the album I Paralyze; with decreasing album sales and a lack of successful singles, Cher decided to focus on her acting career.

In 1987 Cher signed with Geffen Records and released her first album in five years: Cher proved to be successful on the music charts and was certified platinum by the RIAA. Her nineteenth studio album Heart of Stone (1989) peaked at number one in Australia and entered the top 10 in several other territories; it achieved multi-platinum status and became her best-selling album at that time. In 1991 Cher released her twentieth studio album Love Hurts; it became her first number-one in the United Kingdom and also topped the album charts of several European countries. However, it was less successful in North America. Her fifth official compilation album and last effort with Geffen, Greatest Hits: 1965–1992 was released outside North America and became her second consecutive number-one album in the United Kingdom and reached the top 10 in many countries around the globe. In 1995 she signed with Warner Bros. which became her main record company. The first release with Warner was her 21st studio album It's a Man's World (1995) which was less successful than its predecessors. Her 22nd studio album Believe released at the end of 1998 was heralded as her comeback album and became her best-selling studio album ever, having sold over 11 million units worldwide. 1999's compilation The Greatest Hits released outside the United States became an international chart-topper.

Cher entered the 2000s with the release of the independent album Not Commercial exclusively through her official website. In 2001/02 Cher released her 24th studio album Living Proof which entered the Billboard 200 at number nine and was certified gold. After leaving Warner UK, Cher signed a worldwide deal with the US division of Warner Bros. Records in September 2003. The Very Best of Cher released on the same year was a chart success and was certified triple platinum in the United States. Her third soundtrack album, from the musical film Burlesque was released in 2010 and was certified gold by the RIAA. Cher's studio album, Closer to the Truth, was released in September 2013 and it became her highest-charting solo album when it debuted at number three on the Billboard 200. Cher's latest studio album, Dancing Queen was released on September 28, 2018, and also debuted at number three with first-week sales of 153,000 album-equivalent units, becoming Cher's highest debut sales for an album in the United States, as well as earning her the biggest debut sales for a pop album by a female in the United States in 2018. Cher released her first Christmas album Christmas on October 20, 2023.

On August 1, 2024, it was announced that Cher would be celebrating 60 years in music with her new greatest hits album titled Forever to be released on September 20, 2024. Forever has two editions, a standard edition and a fan edition. The standard edition contains 21 songs while the fan edition contains an additional 19 for a total of 40 songs.

== Albums ==
=== Studio albums ===
List of studio albums, with selected details, chart positions and certifications
Title	Album details	Peak chart positions											Certifications
Title	Album details	US	AUS	AUT	CAN	DEN	GER	NZ	SPA	SWE	SWI	UK	Certifications
All I Really Want to Do	Released: October 16, 1965; Label: Imperial, Liberty; Formats: LP, CD	16	—	—	—	—	—	—	—	—	—	7	
The Sonny Side of Chér	Released: March 28, 1966; Label: Imperial, Liberty; Formats: LP, Reel, CD	26	—	—	—	—	—	—	—	—	—	11	
Chér	Released: September 5, 1966; Label: Imperial, Liberty; Formats: LP, CD	59	—	—	—	—	—	—	—	—	—	—	
With Love, Chér	Released: October 23, 1967; Label: Imperial, Liberty; Formats: LP, CD	47	—	—	—	—	—	—	—	—	—	—	
Backstage	Released: May 27, 1968; Label: Imperial, Liberty; Formats: LP, CD	—	—	—	—	—	—	—	—	—	—	—	
3614 Jackson Highway	Released: June 20, 1969; Label: Atco, Rhino; Formats: LP, CD	160	—	—	—	—	—	—	—	—	—	—	
Gypsys, Tramps & Thieves^{[A]}	Released: September, 1971; Label: Kapp, MCA, Universal; Formats: LP, Cassette, 8-Track, Reel, CD	16	43	—	14	—	—	—	—	—	—	—	US: Gold^{[A]}
Foxy Lady	Released: July 10, 1972; Label: Kapp, MCA; Formats: LP, Cassette, 8-Track, Reel, CD	43	—	—	39	—	—	—	—	—	—	—	
Bittersweet White Light	Released: April, 1973; Label: MCA; Formats: LP, Cassette, 8-Track, Reel, CD	140	—	—	—	—	—	—	—	—	—	—	
Half-Breed	Released: September, 1973; Label: MCA; Formats: LP, Cassette, 8-Track, Reel, CD	28	65	—	21	—	—	—	—	—	—	—	US: Gold
Dark Lady	Released: May, 1974; Label: MCA; Formats: LP, Cassette, 8-Track, Reel, CD	69	86	—	33	—	—	—	—	—	—	—	
Stars	Released: April 19, 1975; Label: Warner Bros.; Formats: LP, 8-Track, Cassette	153	100	—	—	—	—	—	—	—	—	—	
I'd Rather Believe in You	Released: October 12, 1976; Label: Warner Bros.; Formats: LP, 8-Track, Cassette	—	—	—	—	—	—	—	—	—	—	—	
Cherished	Released: August 11, 1977; Label: Warner Bros.; Formats: LP, 8-track, Cassette	—	—	—	—	—	—	—	—	—	—	—	
Take Me Home	Released: January 25, 1979; Label: Casablanca, Philips; Formats: LP, Cassette, 8-track, CD	25	—	—	24	—	—	—	—	—	—	—	US: Gold
Prisoner	Released: October 22, 1979; Label: Casablanca; Formats: LP, Cassette, 8-Track, CD	—	—	—	—	—	—	—	—	—	—	—	
I Paralyze	Released: May 28, 1982; Label: Columbia; Formats: LP, Cassette, 8-track, CD	—	—	—	—	—	—	—	—	—	—	—	
Cher	Released: November 10, 1987; Label: Geffen; Formats: LP, Cassette, CD	32	32	—	39	—	—	—	—	44	—	26	US: Platinum^{[B]}; AUS: Gold^{[C]}; UK: Gold
Heart of Stone	Released: July 10, 1989; Label: Geffen; Formats: LP, Cassette, CD	10	1	15	17	—	19	7	—	19	—	7	US: 3× Platinum; AUS: 4× Platinum^{[C]}; CAN: 4× Platinum; NZ: Platinum; SWE: Gold; UK: Platinum
Love Hurts	Released: June 18, 1991; Label: Geffen; Formats: LP, Cassette, CD	48	15	1	29	3	6	4	—	4	3	1	US: Gold; AUS: Platinum^{[C]}; AUT: Platinum; CAN: Platinum; GER: Platinum; NZ: Platinum; SWE: Platinum; SWI: Platinum; UK: 3× Platinum
It's a Man's World	Released: November 6, 1995; Label: WEA, Reprise; Formats: LP, Cassette, CD	64	—	8	46	—	74	—	51	18	—	10	UK: Gold
Believe	Released: November 10, 1998; Label: WEA, Warner Bros.; Formats: LP, Cassette, CD, MD	4	13	1	1	1	1	1	2	2	2	7	US: 4× Platinum; AUS: 2× Platinum; AUT: Platinum; CAN: 6× Platinum; DEN: 8× Platinum; GER: 2× Platinum; NZ: 2× Platinum; SPA: 4× Platinum; SWE: 3× Platinum; SWI: 2× Platinum; UK: 2× Platinum
Not Commercial	Released: November 8, 2000; Label: Artistdirect; Formats: CD, digital download	Internet-only release^{[D]}											
Living Proof	Released: November 19, 2001; Label: WEA, Warner Bros.; Formats: CD, Cassette, digital download	9	68	19	64	38	13	26	17	29	16	46	US: Gold; DEN: Gold; GER: Gold; SPA: Platinum; SWE: Gold; SWI: Gold; UK: Gold
Closer to the Truth	Released: September 24, 2013; Label: Warner Bros.; Formats: CD, digital download, LP	3	17	11	4	26	6	—	32	45	11	4	CAN: Gold; UK: Silver
Dancing Queen	Released: September 28, 2018; Label: Warner Bros.; Formats: CD, digital download, LP	3	2	4	2	—	5	2	2	7	6	2	CAN: Gold; UK: Silver
Christmas	Released: October 20, 2023; Label: Warner Records; Formats: CD, digital download, LP	32	40	7	37	—	9	18	60	23	12	5	
"—" denotes items that did not chart or were not released.

=== Compilations ===
List of compilation albums, with selected details, chart positions and certifications
Title	Album details	Peak chart positions											Certifications
Title	Album details	US	AUS	AUT	CAN	DEN	GER	NZ	SPA	SWE	SWI	UK	Certifications
Chér's Golden Greats	Released: 1968; Label: Imperial, Liberty; Formats: LP	195	—	—	—	—	—	—	—	—	—	—	
Superpak Vol. I	Released: 1972; Label: United Artists; Formats: LP	92	—	—	—	—	—	—	—	—	—	—	
Superpak Vol. II	Released: 1972; Label: United Artists; Formats: LP	95	—	—	—	—	—	—	—	—	—	—	
Greatest Hits	Released: October 1974; Label: MCA; Formats: LP, Cassette, CD	152	100	—	—	—	—	—	—	—	—	—	
Greatest Hits: 1965–1992^{[E]}	Released: November 9, 1992; Label: Geffen; Formats: LP, CD	—	48	6	—	7	16	6	23	3	19	1	AUT: Gold; GER: Gold; NZ: 4× Platinum; SWE: Platinum; SWI: Gold; UK: 3× Platinum
If I Could Turn Back Time: Cher's Greatest Hits^{[F]}	Released: March 9, 1999; Label: Geffen; Formats: CD, digital download	57	—	—	40	2	—	—	—	—	—	—	US: Gold
The Greatest Hits^{[G]}	Released: November 30, 1999; Label: WEA; Formats: CD, digital download, MD	—	5	1	17	1	1	15	5	4	2	7	AUS: 3× Platinum; AUT: Platinum; CAN: Platinum; DEN: 5× Platinum; GER: Platinum; NZ: Platinum; SPA: Platinum; SWE: 2× Platinum; SWI: Platinum; UK: 2× Platinum
The Very Best of Cher	Released: April 1, 2003; Label: Warner Bros. / W.S.M.; Formats: CD, digital download	4	12	17	18	10	31	—	—	2	10	17	US: 3× Platinum; AUS: 2× Platinum; CAN: Platinum; DEN: Gold; SA: Gold; SWE: Platinum; UK: Gold
Gold	Released: March 1, 2005; Label: Geffen; Formats: CD, digital download	—	—	—	—	—	—	—	—	34	—	—	UK: Silver
Icon	Released: January 4, 2011; Label: Geffen; Formats: CD	—^{[H]}	—	—	—	—	—	—	—	—	—	—^{[I]}	UK: Silver
Forever	Released: September 20, 2024; Label: Warner Records; Formats: CD, digital download, LP	163	—	41	—	—	28	—	52	—	39	44	UK: Gold
"—" denotes items that did not chart or were not released.

=== Soundtrack albums ===
List of soundtrack albums, with selected details, chart positions and certifications
Title	Album details	Peak chart positions											Certifications
Title	Album details	US	AUS	AUT	CAN	DEN	GER	NLD	NOR	NZ	SWI	UK	Certifications
Chastity	Released: June 20, 1969; Label: Atco; Formats: LP	—	—	—	—	—	—	—	—	—	—	—	
Mermaids	Released: November 13, 1990; Label: Geffen; Formats: LP, CD	65	53	29	35	—	55	—	11	—	—	6^{[J]}	CAN: Gold; UK: Silver
Burlesque (with Christina Aguilera)	Released: November 19, 2010; Label: RCA; Formats: CD, digital download	18	2	5	16	38	12	78	—	5	8	9^{[J]}	US: Gold; AUS: Platinum; CAN: Gold; GER: Gold; NZ: Platinum; UK: Gold
Mamma Mia! Here We Go Again	Released: July 13, 2018; Label: Capitol, Polydor; Formats: CD, digital download	3	1	1	4	5	2	3	2	1	2	1	AUT: Platinum; DEN: Gold; NZ: Platinum; UK: 2× Platinum
"—" denotes items that did not chart or were not released.

=== Live albums ===
List of live albums, with selected details, chart positions and certifications
Title	Album details	Peak chart positions										Certifications
Title	Album details	US	AUS	AUT	BEL	FRA	GER	NLD	SCO	SWI	UK	Certifications
VH1 Divas 1999	Released: November 2, 1999; Label: Arista; Formats: Cassette, CD	90	—	43	—	42	60	41	—	14	—	US: Gold; BRA: Gold
VH1 Divas Las Vegas	Released: October 22, 2002; Label: VH1; Formats: CD	104	—	59	50	115	—	93	—	37	—	
Live! The Farewell Tour^{[K]}	Released: August 26, 2003; Label: Warner Bros.; Formats: CD, digital download	40	43	29	82	—	50	—	89	69	79	
"—" denotes items that did not chart or were not released.

=== Video albums ===
List of video albums, with selected details, chart positions and certifications
Title	Video details	Peak chart positions											Certifications
Title	Video details	US	AUS	AUT	BEL	DEN	HUN	NLD	NZ	POR	SWE	UK	Certifications
Extravaganza: Live at the Mirage^{[L]}	Released: 1992; Label: Sony BMG, EV Classics; Formats: VHS, Laserdisc, DVD	3	23	—	—	—	—	—	—	—	13	2	
The Video Collection^{[M]}	Released: 1993; Label: Geffen Records; Formats: VHS, Laserdisc	—	—	—	—	—	—	—	—	—	—	2	
Live in Concert	Released: 1999; Label: HBO Home Video; Formats: VHS, DVD	6	7	—	—	2	20	—	—	—	2	3	ARG: 2× Platinum; AUS: 2× Platinum^{[C]}; BRA: Platinum; UK: Platinum
The Farewell Tour	Released: 2003; Label: Image Entertainment; Formats: VHS, DVD	1	1	8	7	5	7	18	2	3	2	1	US: 3× Platinum; AUS: 8× Platinum^{[C]}; GER: Gold; NZ: Platinum; POR: Silver; SWE: Gold; UK: Platinum
The Very Best of Cher: The Video Hits Collection	Released: 2004; Label: Warner Music Vision; Formats: VHS, DVD	3	4	—	—	—	—	18	—	—	10	3	US: Platinum; AUS: Platinum^{[C]}
"—" denotes items that did not chart or were not released.

=== Other albums ===
List of other album appearances, showing year released and other relevant details
Title	Album details
Two the Hard Way (as Allman and Woman)	Released: November 1977; Label: Warner Bros.; Formats: LP
Black Rose^{[N]}	Released: August 21, 1980; Label: Casablanca; Formats: LP, Cassette, CD

== Notes ==
- A Note that the album Gypsys, Tramps & Thieves was originally released under the title Chér. This is the reason why the Gold certification issued by RIAA in 1972 appears under Chér.
- B Note that the Platinum-award received for Cher (1987), is the first Platinum-award for Cher, which is released through Geffen Records, and not through Kapp records as the Platinum for Cher (1987) appears in RIAA's database. This is an anomaly by RIAA which should not confuse readers.
- C Note that some of Australia's earlier certifications cannot be found in ARIA's database as it covers the years 1997–present; therefore, an editor has contacted the ARIA team via e-mail to obtain all available certifications for Cher issued throughout the years.
- D Not Commercial was released exclusively through the Internet via Cher.com and ArtistDirect, making it ineligible for chart placement or certification.
- E Greatest Hits: 1965–1992 was released for the markets outside North America and Canada.
- F If I Could Turn Back Time: Cher's Greatest Hits was released for the American market, and it was only available as an import to certain European countries.
- G The Greatest Hits was released outside the United States.
- H Icon charted on Billboard's Top Album Sales and Catalog Album Sales charts reaching #91 and #18, respectively.
- I Icon has reached #8 on the Official Charts Company's Official Budget Albums Top 50 chart due to it being released at a non-full price in the UK.
- J Mermaids and Burlesque soundtracks' chart positions are from UK's Official Compilations Top 100 chart.
- K Live! The Farewell Tour was released in limited edition form, with only 200,000 copies available.
- L Extravaganza: Live at the Mirage concert was originally released in 1992 and re-released on DVD in 2005 containing bonus songs which were not included on the VHS version.
- M Greatest Hits: The Video Collection was only released in UK and Brazil to promote Cher's compilation Greatest Hits: 1965–1992.
- N Black Rose was recorded with the self-titled band. In 1999 it was re-released by a German label "Spectrum" with Cher's name on the cover.

== See also ==
- Cher singles discography
- List of songs recorded by Cher
- Cher videography
- Sonny & Cher discography
- List of best-selling albums
- List of best-selling albums by women
