= List of songs recorded by Cher =

Recordings by American singer

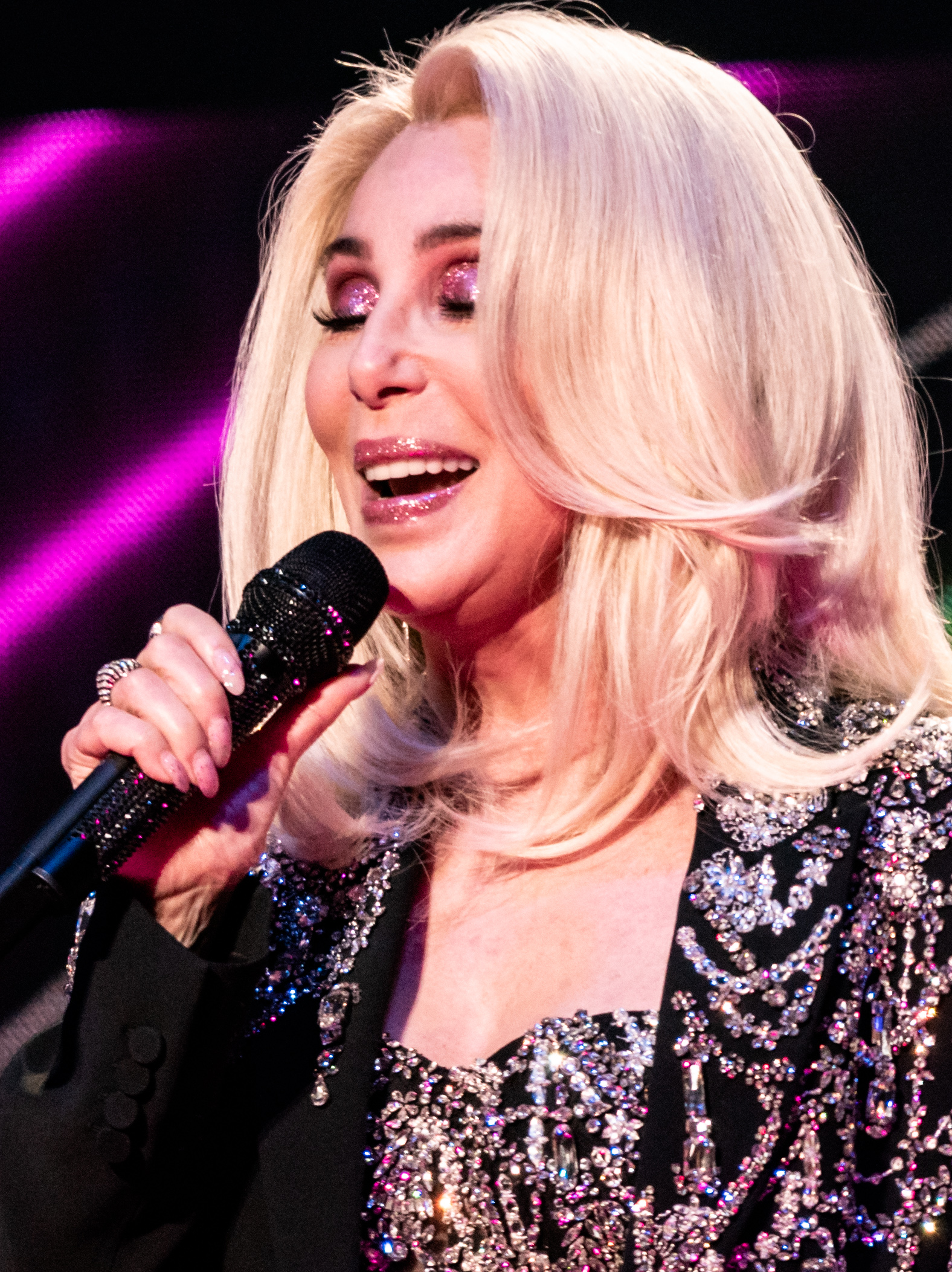
Cher performing on the Here We Go Again Tour, 2019

American entertainer Cher has recorded songs for 27 studio albums and four soundtrack albums, and has been featured on songs on compilation albums or other artists' respective albums. She has also written or co-written several of her songs.

Widely recognized as the "Goddess of Pop", Cher has sold over 100 million records worldwide (as a solo artist) and a further 40 million as part of Sonny & Cher, making her one of the best-selling female recording artists in history. Billboard ranked her as the 109th Greatest Artist of all time and the 49th Greatest Hot 100 Artist of all time. According to RIAA, she has sold 12.5 million albums (including three multi-platinum, four platinum and nine gold records) in the United States. Her signature hit "Believe" has sold more than 11 million copies worldwide, and it is the UK's best-selling single by a female artist in history, and one of the best-selling physical singles of all time.

Different recordings of the same songs have been listed separately.

== Songs ==
Key
•	Indicates songs in Italian
†	Indicates songs covered by Cher
‡	Indicates songs written or co-written by Cher

Name of song, performer(s), writer(s), original release and year of release
Song	Performer(s)	Writer(s)	Album	Year	Ref(s).
"88 Degrees"	Black Rose	Phil Brown	Black Rose	1980	
"After All"	Cher and Peter Cetera	Tom Snow; Dean Pitchford	Heart of Stone	1989	
"Again"	Cher	Joe Allen	Cherished	1977	
"Alfie" (originally by Cilla Black)	Cher	Burt Bacharach; Hal David	Chér	1966	
"Alive Again"	Cher	Chicane; Ray Hedges; Tracy Ackerman	Living Proof	2001	
"All Because of You"	Cher	Jon Lind; Sue Schifrin	Heart of Stone	1989	
"All I Really Want to Do" (originally by Bob Dylan)	Cher	Bob Dylan	All I Really Want to Do	1965	
"All or Nothing"	Cher	Mark Taylor; Paul Barry	Believe	1998	
"Am I Blue?" (originally by Ethel Waters)	Cher	Grant Clarke; Harry Akst	Bittersweet White Light	1973	
"Angels in the Snow"	Cher	Ferras; Sarah Hudson; Jesse Saint John; Brett McLaughlin; James Abrahart; Mark Schick; Lionel Crasta	Christmas	2023	
"Angels Running" (originally by Patty Larkin)	Cher	Patty Larkin	It's a Man's World	1995	
"Apples Don't Fall Far from the Tree"	Cher	Bob Stone	Half-Breed	1974	
"Baby I'm Yours" (originally by Barbara Lewis)	Cher	Van McCoy	Mermaids	1990	
"Baby, I Love You" (originally by the Ronettes)	Cher	Phil Spector; Jeff Barry; Ellie Greenwich	B-side to "A Woman's Story"	1974	
"Back on the Street Again" (originally by The Babys as "Back on My Feet Again")	Cher	Dominic King; Frank Musker; John Waite	I Paralyze	1982	
"Bad Love"	Cher	Giorgio Moroder; Cher	Foxes	1980	
"Bambini Miei" (Note: "Bambini Miei" is the Italian version of "You Better Sit Down Kids".)	Cher	Sonny Bono; Il Guardiano del Faro	Non-album single	1968	
"Bang Bang (My Baby Shot Me Down)"	Cher	Sonny Bono	The Sonny Side of Chér	1966	
"Bang-Bang" (Note: "Bang-Bang is a new version of "Bang Bang (My Baby Shot Me Down)".)	Cher	Sonny Bono	Cher	1987	
"Behind the Door" (originally by Graham Gouldman)	Cher	Graham Gouldman	With Love, Chér	1966	
"Believe"	Cher	Brian Higgins; Stuart McLennen; Paul Barry; Steven Torch; Matthew Gray; Timothy Powell	Believe	1998	
"Bell Bottom Blues" (originally by Derek and the Dominos)	Cher	Eric Clapton; Bobby Whitlock	Stars	1975	
"The Bells of Rhymney" (originally by Pete Seeger)	Cher	Idris Davies; Pete Seeger	All I Really Want to Do	1965	
"Bewitched, Bothered and Bewildered" (originally by Rodgers and Hart)	Rod Stewart and Cher	Richard Rodgers; Lorenz Hart	As Time Goes By: The Great American Songbook, Volume II	2003	
"The Bigger They Come, The Harder They Fall" (originally by Jimmy Cliff as "The Harder They Come")	Cher	Jimmy Cliff	Stars	1975	
"Blowin' in the Wind" (originally by Bob Dylan)	Cher	Bob Dylan	All I Really Want to Do	1965	
"Body to Body, Heart to Heart"	Cher	Diane Warren	Living Proof	2001	
"Book of Love"	Cher	Desmond Child	I Paralyze	1982	
"Born with the Hunger"	Cher	Shirley Eikhard	Not Commercial	1994 (Note: Released in 1999.)	
"Borrowed Time"	Cher	John M. Hill; William Soden; Joe Weber; Spencer Michlin	I'd Rather Believe in You	1976	
"Boys and Girls"	Cher	Billy Falcon	Prisoner	1979	
"But I Can't Love You More"	Cher	Sonny Bono	With Love, Chér	1967	
"By Myself" (originally by Jack Buchanan)	Cher	Arthur Schwartz; Howard Dietz	Bittersweet White Light	1973	
"Can You Fool"	Allman and Woman	Michael Smotherman	Two the Hard Way	1977	
"Carnival" (originally by Luiz Bonfá's "Manhã de Carnaval")	Cher	Hugo Peretti; Luigi Creatore; George David Weiss; Jesus Maria de Arozamena; Luiz Bonfá; Antônio Maria	Backstage	1968	
"Carousel Man"	Cher	Johnny Durrill	Half-Breed	1973	
"Catch the Wind" (originally by Donovan)	Cher	Donovan	Chér	1966	
"Chastity's Song (Band of Thieves)"	Cher	Elyse J. Weinberg	Chastity	1969	
"Chastity Sun" (originally by Seals and Crofts as "Ruby Jean & Billy Lee")	Cher	Dash Crofts; James Seals	Half-Breed	1973	
"Chiquitita" (originally by ABBA)	Cher	Benny Andersson; Björn Ulvaeus	Dancing Queen	2018	
"Chiquitita" (Spanish version) (originally by ABBA)	Cher	Benny Andersson; Björn Ulvaeus	Non-album single	2020	
"Christmas Ain't Christmas Without You"	Cher	Alexis Francis; Mark Taylor; Patrick Mascall; Paul Barry	Christmas	2023	
"Christmas (Baby Please Come Home)" (originally by Darlene Love)	Rosie O'Donnell and Cher	Ellie Greenwich; Jeff Barry; Phil Spector	A Rosie Christmas	1999	
"Christmas (Baby Please Come Home)" (originally by Darlene Love)	Cher and Darlene Love	Ellie Greenwich; Jeff Barry; Phil Spector	Christmas	2023	
"Christmas Is Here"	Cher	Leland; James Abrahart; Jesse Saint John; Lionel Crasta; Mark Schick; Sarah Hudson	Non-album single	2025	
"Classified 1A"	Cher	Sonny Bono	Chér (UK edition)	1971	
"Classified 1A"	Cher	Sonny Bono	Not Commercial	1994	
"Click Song" (originally by Miriam Makeba)	Cher	Miriam Makeba	Backstage	1968	
"Come and Stay with Me" (originally by Marianne Faithfull)	Cher	Jackie DeShannon	All I Really Want to Do	1965	
"Come to Your Window"	Cher	Bob Lind	The Sonny Side of Chér	1965	
"Could've Been You" (originally by Bob Halligan Jr.)	Cher	Arnie Roman; Bob Halligan Jr.	Love Hurts	1991	
"Crimson and Clover" (originally by Tommy James and the Shondells)	Elijah Blue Allman and Cher	Tommy James; Peter Lucia	A Walk on the Moon	1999	
"Cruel War" (originally by Peter, Paul and Mary)	Cher	Paul Stookey; Peter Yarrow	Chér	1966	
"Cry Like a Baby" (originally by The Box Tops)	Cher	Spooner Oldham; Dan Penn	3614 Jackson Highway	1969	
"Cry Myself to Sleep"	Cher	Mike Gordon	All I Really Want to Do	1965	
"Dancing Queen" (originally by ABBA)	Cher	Benny Andersson; Björn Ulvaeus; Stig Anderson	Dancing Queen	2018	
"Dangerous Times"	Cher	Roger Bruno; Susan Pomerantz; Ellen Schwartz	Cher	1987	
"Danny Boy" (originally by Frederic Weatherly)	Cher	Frederic Weatherly	—N/a (Note: In 2001 the song was released on the reissue of 3614 Jackson Highway (1969).)	1969 (Note: Released in 2001.)	
"Dark Lady"	Cher	John Durrill	Dark Lady	1974	
"David's Song"	Cher	David Paich	Half-Breed	1973	
"Dead Ringer for Love"	Meat Loaf featuring Cher	Jim Steinman	Dead Ringer	1981	
"A Different Kind of Love Song"	Cher	Johan Åberg; Michelle Lewis; Sigurd Rosnes	Living Proof	2001	
"Disaster Cake"	Cher	Cher; Pat MacDonald; Bruce Roberts	Not Commercial	1994	
"Dixie"	Cher	John Durrill; Larry Herbstritt	Cherished	1977	
"Dixie Girl"	Cher	John Durrill	Half-Breed	1974	
"DJ Play a Christmas Song"	Cher	Sarah Hudson; Jesse Saint John; Brett McLaughlin; James Abrahart; Mark Schick; Lionel Crasta	Christmas	2023	
"Do I Ever Cross Your Mind"	Cher	Dorsey Burnette; Michael Smotherman	I Paralyze	1982	
"Do Right Woman, Do Right Man" (originally by Aretha Franklin)	Cher	Chips Moman; Dan Penn	3614 Jackson Highway	1969	
"Do You Believe in Magic" (originally by The Lovin' Spoonful)	Cher	John Sebastian	Backstage	1968	
"Do What You Gotta Do" (originally by Jimmy Webb)	Allman and Woman	Jimmy Webb	Two the Hard Way	1977	
"Does Anybody Really Fall in Love Anymore?"	Cher	Diane Warren; Desmond Child; Jon Bon Jovi; Richie Sambora	Heart of Stone	1989	
"Don't Come Around Tonite"	Cher	Maia Sharp; Mark Addison	It's a Man's World	1995	
"Don't Come Cryin' to Me"	Cher	Diane Warren	If I Could Turn Back Time: Cher's Greatest Hits	1989 (Note: Released in 1999.)	
"Don't Ever Try to Close a Rose"	Cher	Ginger Greco	Foxy Lady	1972	
"Don't Hide Your Love"	Cher	Neil Sedaka; Howard Greenfield	Foxy Lady	1972	
"Don't Put It on Me"	Cher	Sonny Bono	Chér (UK edition)	1971	
"Don't Think Twice, It's All Right" (originally by Bob Dylan)	Cher	Bob Dylan	All I Really Want to Do	1965	
"Dov'è l'amore"	Cher	Mark Taylor; Paul Barry	Believe	1998	
"Down, Down, Down"	Cher	Ester Jack	Foxy Lady	1972	
"Dream Baby"	Cher	Sonny Bono	All I Really Want to Do	1965	
"A Dream Is a Wish Your Heart Makes" (originally by Ilene Woods)	Cher	Mack David; Al Hoffman; Jerry Livingston	For Our Children Too!: To Benefit Pediatric AIDS Foundation	1996	
"Dressed to Kill" (originally by Preston)	Cher	Mark Taylor; Preston; Cher	Closer to the Truth	2013	
"Drop Top Sleigh Ride"	Cher and Tyga	Brett McLaughlin; Ferras; James Abrahart; Jesse Saint John; Lionel Crasta; Mark Schick; Michael Stevenson; Sarah Hudson	Christmas	2023	
"Early Morning Strangers" (originally by Barry Manilow)	Cher	Barry Manilow; Hal David	I'd Rather Believe in You	1976	
"Easy to Be Hard" (originally by Three Dog Night)	Cher	Galt MacDermot; James Rado; Gerome Ragni	—N/a	1969	
"Elusive Butterfly" (originally by Bob Lind)	Cher	Bob Lind	The Sonny Side of Chér	1965	
"Emotional Fire"	Cher	Diane Warren; Desmond Child; Michael Bolton	Heart of Stone	1989	
"(The Fall) Kurt's Blues"	Cher	Cher; Pat MacDonald; Bruce Roberts	Not Commercial	1994	
"Fast Company"	Black Rose	Fred Mollin; Larry Mollin	Black Rose	1980	
"Favorite Scars"	Cher	Wayne Hector; Tom Barnes; Peter Kelleher; Ben Kohn	Closer to the Truth	2013	
"Fernando" (originally by ABBA)	Cher and Andy García	Benny Andersson; Björn Ulvaeus; Stig Anderson	Mamma Mia! Here We Go Again: The Movie Soundtrack (Note: The solo version of "Fernando" was included on Dancing Queen (2018).)	2018	
"Fire and Rain" (originally by James Taylor)	Cher	James Taylor	Chér	1971	
"Fire Down Below" (originally by Bob Seger & The Silver Bullet Band)	Cher	Bob Seger	B-side to "I Got You Babe"	1993	
"Fires of Eden"	Cher	Mark Goldenberg; Kit Hain	Love Hurts	1991	
"The First Time"	Cher	Sonny Bono	Non-album single	1969	
"The First Time"	Cher	Sonny Bono	Foxy Lady	1972	
"Fit to Fly"	Cher	Cher; Doug Millett; Kevin Savigar	Not Commercial	1994	
"Flashback"	Cher	Artie Wayne; Alan O'Day	I'd Rather Believe in You	1976	
"For What It's Worth" (originally by Buffalo Springfield)	Cher	Stephen Stills	3614 Jackson Highway	1969	
"Found Someone"	Tyga and Cher	Tyga; Michael Bolton; Mark Mangold	NSFW	2025	
"Games"	Cher	Andrea Farber; Vince Melamed	I Paralyze	1982	
"Gentle Foe"	Cher	Unknown	Once Upon a Wheel	1971	
"Geronimo's Cadillac" (originally by Michael Martin Murphey)	Cher	Michael Martin Murphey; Charles Quarta	Stars	1975	
"Gimme! Gimme! Gimme! (A Man After Midnight)" (originally by ABBA)	Cher	Benny Andersson; Björn Ulvaeus	Dancing Queen	2018	
"Girl Don't Come" (originally by Sandie Shaw)	Cher	Chris Andrews	All I Really Want to Do	1965	
"The Girl from Ipanema" (originally by Stan Getz and João Gilberto)	Cher	Vinicius de Moraes; Norman Gimbel; Antônio Carlos Jobim	The Sonny Side of Chér	1965	
"Git Down (Guitar Groupie)"	Cher	Michele Aller; Bob Esty	Take Me Home	1979	
"Give Our Love a Fightin' Chance"	Cher	Desmond Child; Diane Warren	Cher	1987	
"Go Now" (originally by Bessie Banks)	Cher	Larry Banks; Milton Bennett	Backstage	1968	
"The Greatest Song I Ever Heard"	Cher	Dick Holler	Half-Breed	1973	
"The Greatest Thing"	Cher and Lady Gaga	Lady Gaga; RedOne	Unreleased	2011	
"The Gunman"	Cher	Paddy McAloon; Cher	It's a Man's World	1995	
"Gypsys, Tramps & Thieves"	Cher	Bob Stone	Chér	1971	
"Half-Breed"	Cher	Mary Dean; Al Capps	Half-Breed	1973	
"Happiness Is Just a Thing Called Joe" (originally by Ethel Waters)	Cher	Harold Arlen; Yip Harburg	Non-album single	2020	
"Happy Was the Day We Met"	Cher	Peppi Castro	Take Me Home	1979	
"Hard Enough Getting Over You"	Cher	Michael Bolton; Doug James	Cher	1987	
"He Ain't Heavy, He's My Brother" (originally by Kelly Gordon)	Cher	Bob Russell; Bobby Scott	Chér	1971	
"He Thinks I Still Care" (originally by George Jones)	Cher	Dickey Lee Lipscomb	All I Really Want to Do	1965	
"He Was Beautiful"	Cher	Gloria Sklerov; Harry Lloyd	Cherished	1977	
"He'll Never Know"	Cher	Harry Lloyd; Gloria Sklerov	Chér	1971	
"Heart of Stone" (originally by Bucks Fizz)	Cher	Andy Hill; Pete Sinfield	Heart of Stone	1989	
"Heartbreak Hotel" (Live) (Note: "Heartbreak Hotel" was released as a part of "Elvis Medley Finale", including also "Jailhouse Rock" by Anastacia, "Always on My Mind" by Shakira and "Can't Help Falling in Love" by Céline Dion.) (originally by Elvis Presley)	Cher	Mae Boren Axton; Tommy Durden; Elvis Presley	Divas Las Vegas	2002	
"Hell on Wheels"	Cher	Bob Esty; Michelle Aller	Prisoner	1979	
"Hey Joe" (originally by The Leaves)	Cher	Billy Roberts	With Love, Chér	1967	
"Holdin' Out for Love"	Cher	Tom Snow; Cynthia Weil	Prisoner	1979	
"Holy Smoke!"	Cher	Bob Esty; Michelle Aller	Prisoner	1979	
"Home" (originally by Michael Bublé)	Cher and Michael Bublé	Michael Bublé; Alan Chang; Amy S. Foster	Christmas	2023	
"Homeward Bound" (originally by Simon & Garfunkel)	Cher	Paul Simon	Chér	1966	
"A House Is Not a Home" (originally by Dionne Warwick)	Cher	Burt Bacharach; Hal David	Backstage	1968	
"How Can You Mend a Broken Heart?" (originally by Bee Gees)	Cher	Barry Gibb; Robin Gibb	Half-Breed	1973	
"How Long Has This Been Going On" (originally by Funny Face cast)	Cher	George Gershwin; Ira Gershwin	Bittersweet White Light	1973	
"Human"	Cher	Martin Patrick Crotty	Non-album single	2003	
"I'd Rather Believe in You"	Cher	Michael Omartian; Stormie Omartian	I'd Rather Believe in You	1976	
"I'll Never Stop Loving You"	Cher	David Cassidy; John Wetton; Sue Shifrin	Love Hurts	1991	
"I'm Blowin' Away" (originally by Bonnie Raitt)	Cher	Eric Kaz	It's a Man's World	1995	
"I'm Gonna Love You"	Cher	Sonny Bono	B-side to "All I Really Want to Do" (Note: "I'm Gonna Love You" was later included on Sonny & Cher album Good Times (1967).)	1965	
"I'm in the Middle"	Cher	Billy Gayles	Chér	1971	
"I'm Just Your Yesterday"	Georgia Holt featuring Cher	James Dugan	Honky Tonk Woman	2013	
"I Believe" (originally by Frankie Laine)	Cher	Ervin Drake; Irwin Graham; Jimmy Shirl; Al Stillman	—N/a	1969	
"I Don't Have to Sleep to Dream"	Cher	Bonnie McKee; Madame Buttons; Timbaland; J-Roc; Chris Godbey	Closer to the Truth	2013	
"I Feel Something in the Air (Magic in the Air)"	Cher	Sonny Bono	Chér	1966	
"I Found Someone" (originally by Laura Branigan)	Cher	Michael Bolton; Mark Mangold	Cher	1987	
"I Found You Love"	Allman and Woman	Alan Gordon	Two the Hard Way	1977	
"I Go to Sleep" (originally by Ray Davies)	Cher	Ray Davies	All I Really Want to Do	1965	
"I Got It Bad and That Ain't Good" (originally by Ivie Anderson)	Cher	Duke Ellington; Paul Francis Webster	Bittersweet White Light	1973	
"I Got You Babe" (originally by Sonny & Cher)	Cher with Beavis and Butt-Head	Sonny Bono	The Beavis and Butt-Head Experience	1993	
"I Hate to Sleep Alone"	Cher	Peggy Clinger	Chér	1971	
"I Hope You Find It" (originally by Miley Cyrus)	Cher	Steve Robson; Jeffrey Steele	Closer to the Truth	2013	
"I Know (You Don't Love Me No More)" (originally by Barbara George)	Cher	Barbara George	I'd Rather Believe in You	1976	
"I Like Christmas"	Cher	Bryan Frasher; Maxwell Frasher; Traci Frasher	Christmas	2023	
"I Love Makin' Love to You"	Allman and Woman	Benjamin Weisman; Evie Sands; Richard Germinero	Two the Hard Way	1977	
"I Paralyze"	Cher	John Farrar; Steve Kipner	I Paralyze	1982	
"I Saw a Man and He Danced with His Wife"	Cher	John Durrill	Dark Lady	1974	
"I Still Haven't Found What I'm Looking For" (Live) (originally by U2)	Cher	Adam Clayton; The Edge; Bono; Larry Mullen Jr.	Live! The Farewell Tour	2003	
"I Threw It All Away" (originally by Bob Dylan)	Cher	Bob Dylan	3614 Jackson Highway	1969	
"I Walk Alone"	Cher	Pink; Billy Mann; Niklas "Nikey" Olovson; Robin Lynch	Closer to the Truth	2013	
"I Walk on Guilded Splinters" (originally by Dr. John)	Cher	Dr. John Creaux	3614 Jackson Highway	1969	
"I Want You" (originally by Bob Dylan)	Cher	Bob Dylan	Chér	1966	
"I Wasn't Ready"	Cher	Dr. John Creaux; Jessie Hill	Backstage	1968	
"I Will Wait for You" (originally by Michel Legrand)	Cher	Norman Gimbel; Jacques Demy; Michel Legrand	With Love, Chér	1967	
"I Wouldn't Treat a Dog (The Way You Treated Me)" (originally by Bobby Blue Bland)	Cher	Daniel Walsh; Steve Barri; Michael Price; Michael Omartian	It's a Man's World	1995	
"If I Could Turn Back Time"	Cher	Diane Warren	Heart of Stone	1989	
"If I Knew Then"	Cher	Bob Stone	Foxy Lady	1972	
"Island"	Allman and Woman	Ilene Rappaport	Two the Hard Way	1977	
"It All Adds Up Now"	Cher	Doug Sahm	Backstage	1968	
"The Impossible Dream" (originally by Mitch Leigh)	Cher	Joe Darion; Mitch Leigh	Backstage	1968	
"In For the Night"	Allman and Woman	Ed Sanford; Johnny Townsend	Two the Hard Way	1977	
"It's a Cryin' Shame"	Cher	Dennis Lambert; Brian Potter	I'd Rather Believe in You	1976	
"It's a Man's Man's Man's World" (originally by James Brown)	Cher	James Brown; Betty Jean Newsome	It's a Man's World	1995	
"It's Not Unusual" (originally by Tom Jones)	Cher	Gordon Mills; Leslie Reed	The Sonny Side of Chér	1965	
"It's Too Late to Love Me Now" (originally by Charly McClain)	Cher	Rory Bourke; Gene Dobbins; Johnny Wilson	Take Me Home	1979	
"It Ain't Necessarily So" (originally by Porgy and Bess cast)	Cher	George Gershwin; Ira Gershwin	The Glory of Gershwin	1994	
"It Gets Me Where I Want to Go"	Cher	Gabriel Lapano; Lance Wakely	—N/a	1969	
"It Might as Well Stay Monday (From Now On)"	Cher	Bodie Chandler	Foxy Lady	1972	
"Julie"	Black Rose	Bernie Taupin; Mike Chapman	Black Rose	1980	
"Just Begin Again"	Spinal Tap and Cher	David St. Hubbins; Nigel Tufnel; Derek Smalls	Break Like the Wind	1992	
"(Just Enough to Keep Me) Hangin' On" (originally by The Gosdin Brothers)	Cher	Buddy Mize; Ira Allen	3614 Jackson Highway	1969	
"Just Like Jesse James"	Cher	Diane Warren; Desmond Child	Heart of Stone	1989	
"Just This One Time" (originally by Jimmy Webb)	Cher	Jimmy Webb	Stars	1975	
"Just What I've Been Lookin' For"	Cher	Kenny O'Dell	Dark Lady	1974	
"Kareem"	Inspectah Deck, Method Man, Masta Killa, Raekwon and U-God featuring Redman and Cher	Unknown	Once Upon a Time in Shaolin	2015	
"Kiss to Kiss"	Cher	Jon Lind; Mary D'astugues; Phil Galdston	Heart of Stone	1989	
"Knock on Wood" (originally by Eddie Floyd)	Cher	Eddie Floyd; Steve Cropper	I'd Rather Believe in You	1976	
"L.A. Plane"	Cher	Gary Harju; Larry Herbstritt	Cherished	1977	
"Lay, Baby, Lay" (originally by Bob Dylan)	Cher	Bob Dylan	3614 Jackson Highway	1969	
"Let Me Down Easy"	Cher	John Simon; Al Stillman	Foxy Lady	1972	
"Let This Be a Lesson to You"	Cher	Tom Snow	Take Me Home	1979	
"Lie to Me"	Cher	Pink; Billy Mann	Closer to the Truth	2013	
"Like a Rolling Stone" (originally by Bob Dylan)	Cher	Bob Dylan	The Sonny Side of Chér	1965	
"Living in a House Divided"	Cher	Tom Bahler	Foxy Lady	1972	
"The Look"	Cher	Mark Taylor; Paul Barry	Living Proof (Japanese edition)	2001	
"The Long and Winding Road" (originally by The Beatles)	Cher	John Lennon; Paul McCartney	Half-Breed	1973	
"Long Distance Love Affair"	Cher	Michael Price; Dan Walsh	I'd Rather Believe in You	1976	
"Look at Me"	Cher	Keith Allison	With Love, Chér	1967	
"Love & Pain (Pain in My Heart)" (originally by Richard T. Bear as "Pain in My Heart")	Cher	Richard T. Bear	Take Me Home	1979	
"Love and Understanding"	Cher	Diane Warren	Love Hurts	1991	
"Love Can Build a Bridge" (originally by the Judds)	Cher, Chrissie Hynde and Neneh Cherry with Eric Clapton	John Barlow Jarvis; Naomi Judd; Paul Overstreet	Non-album single	1995	
"A Love Like Yours (Don't Come Knocking Everyday)" (originally by Martha and the Vandellas)	Harry Nilsson and Cher	Brian Holland; Lamont Dozier; Eddie Holland	All Meat	1975	
"Love So High"	Cher	John Capek; Marc Jordan	Living Proof	2001	
"Love One Another" (originally by Amber)	Cher	Billy Steinberg; Amber; Rick Nowels	Living Proof	2001	
"Love the Devil Out of Ya"	Cher	John Durrill; Doc Pomus	Cherished	1977	
"Love Enough" (originally by Tim Moore)	Cher	Tim Moore	Stars	1975	
"Love Hurts" (originally by The Everly Brothers)	Cher	Boudleaux Bryant	Stars	1975	
"Love Hurts" (originally by The Everly Brothers)	Cher	Boudleaux Bryant	Love Hurts	1991	
"Love Is the Groove" (originally by Betsy Cook)	Cher	Betsy Cook; Bruce Woolley	Believe	1998	
"Love Is a Lonely Place Without You"	Cher	Mark Taylor; Paul Barry; Steve Torch	Living Proof	2001	
"Love Me" (originally by Jerry Leiber and Mike Stoller)	Allman and Woman	Jerry Leiber; Mike Stoller	Two the Hard Way	1977	
"Love on a Rooftop"	Cher	Diane Warren; Desmond Child	Heart of Stone	1989	
"Lovers Forever"	Cher	Cher; Shirley Eikhard	Closer to the Truth	2013	
"Ma Piano (Per Non Svegliarmi)"	Cher and Nico Fidenco	Gianni Meccia	Non-album single	1967	
"Main Man"	Cher	Desmond Child	Cher	1987	
"Make the Man Love Me"	Cher	Cynthia Weil; Barry Mann	Dark Lady	1974	
"Mamma Mia" (originally by ABBA)	Cher	Benny Andersson; Björn Ulvaeus; Stig Anderson	Dancing Queen	2018	
"The Man I Love" (originally by Strike Up the Band cast)	Cher	George Gershwin; Ira Gershwin	Bittersweet White Light	1973	
"The Man That Got Away" (originally by Judy Garland)	Cher	Harold Arlen; George Gershwin	Bittersweet White Light	1973	
"Mama (When My Dollies Have Babies)"	Cher	Sonny Bono	With Love, Chér	1966	
"Mama" (Note: "Mama" is the Italian version of "Mama (When My Dollies Have Babies)".)	Cher	Sonny Bono; Graham Gouldman; Paolo Dossena	Non-album single	1967	
"Many Rivers to Cross" (Live) (originally by Jimmy Cliff)	Cher	Jimmy Cliff	Greatest Hits: 1965–1992	1992	
"Masters of War" (originally by Bob Dylan)	Cher	Bob Dylan	Backstage	1968	
"Melody"	Cher	Cliff Crofford; Thomas L. Garrett	Half-Breed	1973	
"Milord" (originally by Édith Piaf)	Cher	Bunny Lewis; Marguerite Monnot; Georges Moustaki	The Sonny Side of Chér	1965	
"Mirror Image"	Cher	Bob Esty; Michael Brooks	Prisoner	1979	
"Miss Subway of 1952"	Cher	Mary F. Cain	Dark Lady	1974	
"Momma Look Sharp" (originally by 1776 cast)	Cher	Sherman Edwards	—N/a	1969	
"More Than You Know" (originally by Mayo Methot)	Cher	Vincent Youmans; Billy Rose; Edward Eliscu	Bittersweet White Light	1973	
"Move Me"	Allman and Woman	Fred Beckmeier; Vella M. Cameron; Steve Beckmeier; Jimmie Cameron	Two the Hard Way	1977	
"Mr. Soul" (originally by Buffalo Springfield)	Cher	Neil Young	Stars	1975	
"The Music's No Good Without You"	Cher	Cher; James Thomas; Mark Taylor; Paul Barry	Living Proof	2001	
"My Love"	Cher	Dario Brigham-Bowes; Lorne Ashley Brigham-Bowes; Paul Barry; Greta Svabo Bech	Closer to the Truth	2013	
"My Song (Too Far Gone)"	Cher	Cher; Brett Hudson; Mark Hudson	Take Me Home	1979	
"My Love" (originally by Paul McCartney and Wings)	Cher	Paul McCartney; Linda McCartney	Half-Breed	1973	
"The Name of the Game" (originally by ABBA)	Cher	Benny Andersson; Björn Ulvaeus; Stig Anderson	Dancing Queen	2018	
"Needles and Pins" (originally by Jackie DeShannon)	Cher	Sonny Bono; Jack Nitzsche	All I Really Want to Do	1965	
"Never Been to Spain" (originally by Three Dog Night song)	Cher	Hoyt Axton	Foxy Lady	1972	
"Nel Mio Cielo Ci Sei Tu" (Note: "Nel Mio Cielo Ci Sei Tu" is the Italian version of "I Feel Something in the Air".)	Cher	Sonny Bono; Alberto Testa	B-side to "Ma Piano (Per Non Svegliarmi)"	1967	
"Never Should've Started"	Black Rose	David Foster; David Paich; James Newton Howard; Valerie Carter	Black Rose	1980	
"Not Enough Love in the World" (originally by Don Henley)	Cher	Don Henley; Danny Kortchmar; Benmont Tench	It's a Man's World	1995	
"Oh No Not My Baby" (originally by Maxine Brown)	Cher	Carole King; Gerry Goffin	Greatest Hits: 1965–1992	1992	
"Ol' Man River" (originally by Paul Whiteman and His Concert Orchestra)	Cher	Oscar Hammerstein II; Jerome Kern	The Sonny Side of Chér	1965	
"One by One"	Cher	Anthony Griffiths; Cher	It's a Man's World	1995	
"One Honest Man"	Cher	Ginger Greco	Chér	1971	
"One of Us" (originally by ABBA)	Cher	Benny Andersson; Björn Ulvaeus	Dancing Queen	2018	
"One Small Step"	Cher	Barry Mann; Brad Parker; Wendy Waldman	Love Hurts	1991	
"Ooga Boo"	Cher	Alex Geringas; Todd Garfield	Non-album single	2017	
"Our Day Will Come" (originally by Ruby & the Romantics)	Cher	Bob Hilliard; Mort Garson	The Sonny Side of Chér	1965	
"Our Lady of San Francisco"	Cher	Cher; Michael Garvin; Rich Wayland	Not Commercial	1994	
"Outrageous"	Cher	Bob Esty; Michelle Aller	Prisoner	1979	
"Paradise Is Here" (originally by Tina Turner)	Cher	Paul Brady	It's a Man's World	1995	
"Perfection"	Cher	Desmond Child; Diane Warren	Cher	1987	
"The Pied Piper" (originally by Crispian St. Peters)	Cher	Steve Duboff; Artie Kornfield	Chér	1966	
"Pirate"	Cher	Steve Dorff; Larry Herbstritt; Gary Harju	Cherished	1976	
"Più che puoi"	Eros Ramazzotti and Cher	Eros Ramazzotti; Adelio Cogliati; Antonio Galbiati; Cher	Stilelibero	2000	
"Please Come Home for Christmas" (originally by Charles Brown)	Cher	Charles Brown; Gene Redd	Christmas	2023	
"Please Don't Tell Me"	Cher	Carroll W. Quillen; Grady Smith	3614 Jackson Highway	1969	
"The Power" (originally by Amy Grant)	Cher	Tommy Simms; Judson Spence	Believe	1998	
"Pride"	Cher	L.P. Marc Nelkin; Carl Ryden	Closer to the Truth	2013	
"Prisoner"	Cher	David Paich	Prisoner	1979	
"Proud Mary" (Live) (originally by Creedence Clearwater Revival)	Tina Turner, Elton John and Cher	John Fogerty	Divas Live '99	1999	
"Put a Little Holiday in Your Heart" (originally by LeAnn Rimes)	Cher and Cyndi Lauper	Greg Wojahn; Rodger Wojahn; Scott Wojahn	Christmas	2023	
"Rain, Rain"	Cher	Shelly Peiken; Guy Roche	Living Proof	2001	
"Real Love"	Cher	Cher; Tor Hermansen; Mikkel Eriksen; Hallgeir Rustan	Living Proof	2001	
"Reason to Believe" (originally by Tim Hardin)	Cher	Tim Hardin	Backstage	1968	
"Red"	Cher	L.P. Marc Nelkin; Carl Ryde	Closer to the Truth	2013	
"Rescue Me" (originally by Fontella Bass)	Cher	Carl Smith; Raynard Miner	Half-Breed	1974	
"Ringo, I Love You"	Cher (as Bonnie Jo Mason)	Phil Spector; Paul Case; Vini Poncia; Peter Andreoli	Non-album single	1964	
"Rock and Roll Doctor" (originally by Little Feat)	Cher	Lowell George; Fred Martin	Stars	1975	
"Rudy"	Cher	Jacques Morali; Henri Belolo; Fergie Frederiksen; Howie Epstein; James "Jimmy" Hunter; Mark Maierhoffer	I Paralyze	1982	
"Run Rudolph Run" (originally by Chuck Berry)	Cher	Chuck Berry; Johnny Marks; Marvin Brodie	Christmas	2023	
"Runaway"	Cher	Mark Taylor; Paul Barry	Believe	1998	
"Runnin'"	Cher	Cher; Pat MacDonald; Bruce Roberts	Not Commercial	1994	
"The Same Mistake" (originally by Marc Jordan)	Cher	Marc Jordan; John Capek	It's a Man's World	1995	
"Santa Baby" (originally by Eartha Kitt)	Cher	Joan Javits; Philip Springer; Tony Springer	Christmas	2023	
"Save Up All Your Tears" (originally by Bonnie Tyler)	Cher	Diane Warren; Desmond Child	Love Hurts	1991	
"Save the Children"	Cher	Eddie Hinton	3614 Jackson Highway	1969	
"Say What's on Your Mind"	Cher	J. Gottschalk	I Paralyze	1982	
"Say the Word"	Cher	Michele Aller; Bob Esty	Take Me Home	1979	
"See See Rider" (originally by Ma Rainey)	Cher	traditional	All I Really Want to Do	1965	
"Send the Man Over"	Cher	Cliff Crofford; Snuff Garrett	Cherished	1977	
"Shadow Dream Song"	Allman and Woman	Jackson Browne	Two the Hard Way	1977	
"Shape of Things to Come"	Cher	Trevor Horn; Lol Creme	It's a Man's World	1995	
"She's No Better Than Me"	Cher	Sonny Bono	B-side to "Alfie"	1966	
"She Loves to Hear the Music"	Cher	Peter Allen; Carole Bayer Sager	Cherished	1977	
"The Shoop Shoop Song (It's in His Kiss)" (originally by Betty Everett as "It's in His Kiss")	Cher	Rudy Clark	Mermaids	1990	
"Shoppin'"	Cher	Bob Esty; Michelle Aller	Prisoner	1979	
"Silver Wings & Golden Rings"	Cher	Gloria Sklerov; Molly Ann Leikin	I'd Rather Believe in You	1976	
"Sing for Your Supper" (originally by Richard Rodgers)	Cher	Lorenz Hart; Richard Rodgers	With Love, Chér	1967	
"Sirens"	Cher	Mark Taylor; Patrick Mascall; Nell Bryden; JP Jones	Closer to the Truth	2013	
"Sisters of Mercy"	Cher	Cher; Pat MacDonald; Bruce Roberts	Not Commercial	1994	
"(Sittin' On) The Dock of the Bay" (originally by Otis Redding)	Cher	Steve Cropper; Otis Redding	3614 Jackson Highway	1969	
"Skin Deep" (originally by CINDY)	Cher	Jon Lind; Mark Goldenberg	Cher	1987	
"Some Guys" (originally by Bonnie Hayes)	Cher	Bonnie Hayes; Franne Golde	B-side to "If I Could Turn Back Time"	1989	
"Song Called Children"	Cher	Bob West	Backstage	1968	
"Song for the Lonely" (or "(This is) A Song for the Lonely")	Cher	Mark Taylor; Paul Barry; Steve Torch	Living Proof	2001	
"Song for You" (originally by Leon Russell)	Cher	Leon Russell	Foxy Lady	1972	
"Sonny Boy"/"My Mammy"/"Rock-a-Bye Your Baby with a Dixie Melody" (medley) (originally by Al Jolson)	Cher	Al Jolson; Buddy DeSylva; Lew Brown; Ray Henderson; Joe Young; Sam M. Lewis; Walter Donaldson; Jean Schwartz	Bittersweet White Light	1973	
"SOS" (originally by ABBA)	Cher	Benny Andersson; Björn Ulvaeus; Stig Anderson	Dancing Queen	2018	
"Spring"	Cher	John Tipton	I'd Rather Believe in You	1976	
"The Star-Spangled Banner" (Live at Super Bowl XXXIII)	Cher	John Stafford Smith; Francis Scott Key	Non-album single	1999	
"Stars" (originally by Janis Ian)	Cher	Janis Ian	Stars	1975	
"Starting Over"	Cher	Michael Bolton; Jonathan Cain	Heart of Stone	1989	
"Still"	Cher	Cher; Bruce Roberts; Bob Thiele	Not Commercial	1994	
"Still in Love with You"	Cher	Michael Bolton; Bob Halligan	Heart of Stone	1989	
"Stone Finger"	Inspectah Deck, Method Man, Masta Killa, Raekwon and U-God featuring Redman and Cher	Unknown	Once Upon a Time in Shaolin	2015	
"Stop Crying Your Heart Out" (originally by Oasis)	BBC Radio 2 Allstars (Note: Bryan Adams, Izzy Bizu, Grace Chatto, Cher, Melanie C, Jamie Cullum, Ella Eyre, Paloma Faith, Rebecca Ferguson, Jess Glynne, Lenny Kravitz, KSI, Lauv, Ava Max, Kylie Minogue, James Morrison, Gregory Porter, Nile Rodgers, Jack Savoretti, Jay Sean, Anoushka Shankar, Robbie Williams and Yola.)	Noel Gallagher	Non-album single	2020	
"Strong Enough"	Cher	Mark Taylor; Paul Barry	Believe	1998	
"The Sun Ain't Gonna Shine Anymore" (originally by Frankie Valli)	Cher	Bob Gaudio; Bob Crewe	It's a Man's World	1995	
"Sunny" (originally by Bobby Hebb)	Cher	Bobby Hebb	Chér	1966	
"Super Trouper" (originally by ABBA)	The cast of Mamma Mia! Here We Go Again (Note: Cher, Meryl Streep, Christine Baranski, Julie Walters, Dominic Cooper, Pierce Brosnan, Colin Firth, Stellan Skarsgård, Andy García, Josh Dylan, Jeremy Irvine, Hugh Skinner, Amanda Seyfried, Lily James, Jessica Keenan Wynn and Alexa Davies.)	Benny Andersson; Björn Ulvaeus	Mamma Mia! Here We Go Again: The Movie Soundtrack	2018	
"Superstar" (originally by Delaney & Bonnie)	Cher	Bonnie Bramlett; Delaney Bramlett; Leon Russell	Non-album single	1970	
"Take It From the Boys"	Black Rose	Carole Bayer Sager; Bruce Roberts	Black Rose	1980	
"Take Me for a Little While" (originally by Maurizio Arcieri as "E Schiaffeggiarti!...")	Cher	Trade Martin	Backstage	1968	
"Take Me Home"	Cher	Michele Aller; Bob Esty	Take Me Home	1979	
"Take It Like a Man"	Cher	Tim Powell; Tebey; Mary Leay; Cher	Closer to the Truth	2013	
"Takin' Back My Heart"	Cher	Diane Warren	Believe	1998	
"Taxi Taxi"	Cher	Todd Terry; Mark Jordan	Believe	1998	
"These Days" (originally by Jackson Browne)	Cher	Jackson Browne	Stars	1975	
"This God-Forsaken Day"	Cher	Jack Segal	Half-Breed	1973	
"This Will Be Our Year" (originally by The Zombies)	Cher	Chris White	Christmas	2023	
"Time"	Cher	Michael Merchant	The Sonny Side of Chér	1965	
"Twelfth of Never" (originally by Johnny Mathis)	Cher	Jerry Livingston; Paul Francis Webster	Chér	1966	
"There but for Fortune" (originally by Phil Ochs)	Cher	Phil Ochs	With Love, Chér	1967	
"The Thought of Loving You"	Cher	David White	B-side to "Yours Until Tomorrow"	1969	
"Thunderstorm"	Cher	John Durrill; Sandy Pinkard	Cherished	1977	
"The Times They Are a-Changin'" (originally by Bob Dylan)	Cher	Bob Dylan	With Love, Chér	1967	
"Tonight I'll Be Staying Here with You" (originally by Bob Dylan)	Cher	Bob Dylan	3614 Jackson Highway	1969	
"Touch and Go" (originally by Al Wilson)	Cher	Jerry Fuller	Chér	1971	
"Trail of Broken Hearts"	Cher	Bruce Foster; Richie Sambora; Thomas J. Marolda	Days of Thunder	1990	
"Train of Thought"	Cher	Alan O'Day	Dark Lady	1974	
"Two People Clinging to a Thread"	Cher	Gloria Sklerov; Harry Lloyd	Half-Breed	1973	
"Until It's Time for You to Go" (originally by Buffy Sainte-Marie)	Cher	Buffy Sainte-Marie	Chér	1966	
"Walk with Me"	Cher	Desmond Child; David Wolfert	I Paralyze	1982	
"Walking in Memphis" (originally by Marc Cohn)	Cher	Marc Cohn	It's a Man's World	1995	
"Walls"	Cher	Jem Cooke; Mark Taylor; Patrick Mascall	Non-album single	2021	
"War Paint and Soft Feathers"	Cher	Cloretta Kay Miller; Sandy Pinkard; Al Capps	Cherished	1977	
"Wasn't It Good"	Cher	Michele Aller; Bob Esty	Take Me Home	1979	
"Waterloo" (originally by ABBA)	Cher	Benny Andersson; Björn Ulvaeus; Stig Anderson	Dancing Queen	2018	
"The Way of Love" (originally by Colette Deréal as "J'ai le mal de toi" cover)	Cher	Al Stillman; Jacques Diéval	Chér	1971	
"We All Fly Home"	Black Rose	Johnny Vastano; Vince Poncia	Black Rose	1980	
"We All Sleep Alone"	Cher	Desmond Child; Jon Bon Jovi; Richie Sambora	Cher	1987	
"We All Sleep Alone"	Cher	Desmond Child; Jon Bon Jovi; Richie Sambora	Believe	1998	
"We're Gonna Make It"	Allman and Woman	Billy Davis; Carl Smith; Raynard Miner; Gene Barge	Two the Hard Way	1977	
"Welcome to Burlesque"	Cher	Charlie Midnight; Matthew Gerrard; Steve Lindsey; John Patrick Shanley	Burlesque	2010	
"What'll I Do" (originally by Paul Whiteman)	Cher	Irving Berlin	Half-Breed	1974	
"What About the Moonlight"	Cher	Kathleen York; Michael Dorian	It's a Man's World	1995	
"What Christmas Means to Me" (originally by Stevie Wonder)	Cher and Stevie Wonder	Anna Gaye; Allen Story; George Gordy	Christmas	2023	
"When Love Calls Your Name"	Cher	Jimmy Scott; Tom Snow	Love Hurts	1991	
"When Lovers Become Strangers"	Cher	Diane Warren	Love Hurts	1991	
"When the Love Is Gone"	Cher	Desmond Child	I Paralyze	1982	
"When the Money's Gone" (originally by Bruce Roberts)	Cher	Bruce Roberts; Donna Weiss	Living Proof	2001	
"When You Find Out Where You're Goin' Let Me Know"	Cher	Linda Laurie	Chér	1971	
"When You Walk Away"	Cher	Diane Warren	Living Proof	2001	
"Whenever You're Near"	Cher	Tommy Shaw; Jack Blades	Greatest Hits: 1965–1992	1992	
"Where Do You Go"	Cher	Sonny Bono	The Sonny Side of Chér	1965	
"Who You Gonna Believe"	Cher	Gerald Marquez; Kevin Chalfant; Joe Marquez; Steve Fontano	Love Hurts	1991	
"Why Was I Born" (originally by Helen Morgan)	Cher	Jerome Kern; Oscar Hammerstein II	Bittersweet White Light	1973	
"Will You Love Me Tomorrow" (originally by The Shirelles)	Cher	Gerry Goffin; Carole King	Chér	1966	
"Will You Wait for Me"	Cher	Billy Mann; Don Cook	Closer to the Truth (deluxe edition)	2013	
"The Winner Takes It All" (originally by ABBA)	Cher	Benny Andersson; Björn Ulvaeus	Dancing Queen	2018	
"With or Without You"	Cher	Cher	Not Commercial	1994	
"A Woman's Story"	Cher	April Stevens; Nino Tempo; Phil Spector	Non-album single (Note: In 2024 "A Woman's Story" was released on Forever.)	1974	
"Woman's World"	Cher	Matt Morris; Paul Oakenfold; Anthony "TC" Crawford; Joshua "J.D." Walker	Closer to the Truth	2013	
"Working Girl"	Cher	Michael Bolton; Desmond Child	Cher	1987	
"A World Without Heroes" (originally by Kiss)	Cher	Bob Ezrin; Gene Simmons; Lou Reed; Paul Stanley	Love Hurts	1991	
"You've Made Me So Very Happy" (originally by Brenda Holloway)	Cher	Brenda Holloway; Patrice Holloway; Frank Wilson; Berry Gordy	B-side to "The First Time"	1969	
"You've Really Got a Hold on Me" (originally by The Miracles)	Allman and Woman	Smokey Robinson	Two the Hard Way	1977	
"You Better Sit Down Kids"	Cher	Sonny Bono	With Love, Chér	1967	
"You Don't Have to Say You Love Me" (originally by Dusty Springfield)	Cher	Pino Donaggio; Vito Pallavicini	Chér	1966	
"You Do You Boov"	Cher and Rachel Crow	Unknown	Non-album single	2017	
"You Haven't Seen the Last of Me"	Cher	Diane Warren	Burlesque	2010	
"You Know It"	Black Rose	Les Dudek	Black Rose	1980	
"You Take It All"	Cher	Stuart McLennan; Chicane; Brian Higgins	Living Proof	2001	
"You Wouldn't Know Love"	Cher	Diane Warren; Michael Bolton	Heart of Stone	1989	
"Young and Pretty"	Black Rose	Allee Willis; Richard "T Bear" Gerstein	Black Rose	1980	
"A Young Girl (Une enfante)" (originally by Charles Aznavour as "Une enfant")	Cher	Oscar Brown, Jr. Charles Aznavour; Robert Chauvigny	The Sonny Side of Chér	1966	
"Yours Until Tomorrow" (originally by Vivian Reed)	Cher	Gerry Goffin; Carole King	Non-album single	1969	
