= Icon (Cher album) =

Greatest hits album by Cher
- Released: January 4, 2011
- Recorded: 1971–1991
- Length: 41:31
- Label: Geffen, UME

Cher chronology
Burlesque (2010)	Icon (2011)	Closer to the Truth (2013)

Professional ratings
Review scores
Source	Rating
AllMusic	3/5 stars

Icon is a greatest hits album by Cher, released in 2011 by Geffen Records. It is part of the Icon album series by Universal Music Enterprises.

== Track listing ==
No.	Title	Writer(s)	Producer(s)	Length
1.	"If I Could Turn Back Time" (from Heart of Stone, 1989)	Diane Warren	Warren; Guy Roche	4:03
2.	"I Found Someone" (from Cher, 1987)	Michael Bolton; Mark Mangold	Bolton	3:46
3.	"After All" (Love Theme from Chances Are) (duet with Peter Cetera, from Heart of Stone, 1989)	Dean Pitchford; Tom Snow	Peter Asher	4:07
4.	"Half-Breed" (from Half-Breed, 1973)	Al Capps; Mary Dean	Garrett	2:46
5.	"Gypsies, Tramps & Thieves" (from Chér, 1971)	Bob Stone	Snuff Garrett	2:38
6.	"We All Sleep Alone" (from Cher, 1987)	Jon Bon Jovi, Child, Richie Sambora	Bon Jovi, Child, Sambora	3:51
7.	"Dark Lady" (from Dark Lady, 1974)	Johnny Durrill	Garrett	3:29
8.	"Just Like Jesse James" (from Heart of Stone, 1989)	Desmond Child; Warren	Child	4:07
9.	"The Way of Love" (from Chér, 1971)	Al Stillman; Jacques Dieval	Garrett	2:34
10.	"Love and Understanding" (from Love Hurts, 1991)	Warren	Roche; Warren	4:44
11.	"Living in a House Divided" (from Foxy Lady, 1972)	Tom Bahler	Garrett	2:57
12.	"The Shoop Shoop Song (It's in His Kiss)" (from Mermaids soundtrack, 1990)	Rudy Clark	Asher	2:53
Total length:				41:31

== Charts ==
Chart (2011–18)	Peak position
Scottish Albums (OCC)	60
UK Budget Albums (OCC)	8
US Billboard Top Album Sales	91
US Billboard Catalog Album Sales	18
US Billboard Physical Catalog Albums	9

== Certifications and sales ==
Region	Certification	Certified units/sales
United Kingdom (BPI)	Silver	60,000^{‡}
^{‡} Sales+streaming figures based on certification alone.
