= The First Time Ever (I Saw Your Face) (Vikki Carr album) =

Studio album by Vikki Carr
- Released: 1972
- Genre: Pop
- Label: Columbia
- Producer: Snuff Garrett

Vikki Carr chronology
Canta en Espanol (1972)	The First Time Ever (I Saw Your Face) (1972)	Live at The Greek Theatre (1973)

Professional ratings
Review scores
Source	Rating
Allmusic	3/5 stars

The First Time Ever (I Saw Your Face) is a 1972 album by pop vocalist Vikki Carr. The album was issued in the UK as "Song Sung Blue" with the same artwork (except for the album title) and "Big Hurt" replacing "The Hands of Time".

== Chart performance ==
The album debuted on Billboard magazine's Top LP's & Tape chart in the issue dated June 24, 1972, peaking at No. 146 during a twelve-week run on the chart.

== Track listing (US) ==
1. "The First Time Ever (I Saw Your Face)"
2. "(Last Night) I Didn't Get to Sleep at All"
3. "Theme from Summer of '42 (The Summer Knows)"
4. "Gypsies, Tramps and Thieves"
5. "Without You"
6. "Song Sung Blue"
7. "Speak Softly Love (Love Theme From The Godfather)"
8. "Cabaret"
9. "Help Me Make It Through the Night"
10. "The Hands of Time" (from Brian's Song)
11. "The Way of Love"

== Track listing (UK) ==
1. "The First Time Ever (I Saw Your Face)" (Ewan MacColl)
2. "(Last Night) I Didn't Get to Sleep at All" (Tony Macaulay)
3. "Theme from Summer of '42 (The Summer Knows) (The Summer Knows)" (Marilyn Bergman, Alan Bergman, Michel Legrand)
4. "Gypsies, Tramps and Thieves" (Robert Stone)
5. "Without You" (Pete Ham, Tom Evans)
6. "Song Sung Blue" (Neil Diamond)
7. "Speak Softly Love (Love Theme From The Godfather)" (Larry Kusic, Nino Rota)
8. "Cabaret" (Fred Ebb, John Kander)
9. "Help Me Make It Through the Night" (Kris Kristofferson)
10. "Big Hurt" (Wayne Shanklin)
11. "The Way of Love" (Al Stillman, Jacques Dieval)

== Charts ==
Chart (1972)	Peak position
US Billboard Top LPs & Tape	146
