= Bittersweet White Light =

Studio album by Cher
- Released: April 1973
- Recorded: 1972–73
- Studio: Larrabee (West Hollywood)
- Genre: Traditional pop; soft rock
- Length: 34:32
- Label: MCA
- Producer: Sonny Bono

Cher chronology
| Foxy Lady (1972) | Bittersweet White Light (1973) | Half-Breed (1973) |

Singles from Bittersweet White Light
- 1. "Am I Blue" Released: 1973

Bittersweet White Light is the ninth studio album by American singer Cher. It is composed mostly of covers of American pop standards and was released in April 1973 by MCA both in the UK and the US. It was the last solo Cher album to be produced by Sonny Bono, then her husband and performing partner. While the album is a favorite among Cher fans, critical reviews were mixed, and Bittersweet White Light was Cher's first commercial failure of the 1970s.

== Production and release ==
Due to the success of Cher's solo torch spots on The Sonny & Cher Comedy Hour, such as "My Funny Valentine" and "What a Difference a Day Makes," Bono decided she should record an album featuring modern arrangements of standards from the 1920s, 1930s, and 1940s.

Bittersweet White Light was a collection of fully orchestrated, lushly-arranged classics. Bono had started in the music business working with "Wall of Sound" producer Phil Spector and the album clearly demonstrates Spector's influence. Songs in the record range from Gershwin tunes "How Long Has This Been Going On?" and "The Man I Love" to Al Jolson's "Sonny Boy" to Judy Garland's "The Man That Got Away" to Duke Ellington's "I Got It Bad and That Ain't Good". The album was promoted on her successful The Sonny & Cher Comedy Hour show. The title of the album was reported to be taken from the staging of such songs on her television show—which she performed in front of a torch spotlight. Bittersweet White Light was also the first of Cher's albums to feature medleys, "Jolson Medley", and with track mixed, "How Long Has This Been Going On" with "The Man I Love" and "Why Was I Born" with "The Man That Got Away". The other albums that got tracks mixed together were Take Me Home and Prisoner.

Bittersweet White Light was re-released on CD in 1999 under the name Bittersweet: The Love Songs Collection along with selected ballads tracks from other Cher albums, including Cher, Half-Breed and Dark Lady. The disc was compiled and co-produced by Mike Khouri.

== Singles ==
"Am I Blue", a 1929 standard composed by Harry Akst (music) and Grant Clarke (lyrics), was released as the album's only single (#MCA-40039) and featured "How Long Has This Been Going On" as its B-side. Commercially, it reached #111 on the Billboard's Bubbling Under Hot 100, #79 on the Cash Box chart, and #96 on the Record World chart.

== Critical reception ==
Professional ratings
Review scores
| Source | Rating |
|---|---|
| AllMusic | 2/5 stars |
| The Encyclopedia of Popular Music | 2/5 stars |

Billboard noted that the album consists "entirely of ballad-rocked standards" and that it "should please Cher's TV fans". Meanwhile, Cash Box praised the production, saying it "is far above and quite inventive". The Observer–Reporter described the album as "mostly an album of old standards", highlighting "Am I Blue" and "The Man I Love" as "standouts", while noting that Sonny Bono added "a mod touch to the production", although "about half of it doesn't work". Pittsburgh Post-Gazette argued that Cher is "drowned in over lush arrangements", adding that "the material doesn't even seem suited for her". High Fidelity described it as "a most respectable album", praising the orchestrations by Albert Harris, whose arrangements were said to give Cher "exactly what [she] needed", with "strings soaring" and "everything in place harmonically and dynamically".

== Commercial performance ==
Bittersweet White Light was her first commercial failure of the 1970s. It charted only on the US Billboard 200 at 140. Unlike the previous release, the album did not enter the Canadian album chart, or any European charts. Due to the album's lack of success, only one single was released, "Am I Blue". It missed the Billboard Hot 100 chart.

== Track listing ==
Side one
| No. | Title | Writer(s) | Length |
|---|---|---|---|
| 1. | "By Myself" | Arthur Schwartz; Howard Dietz | 3:24 |
| 2. | "I Got It Bad and That Ain't Good" | Duke Ellington; Paul Francis Webster | 3:47 |
| 3. | "Am I Blue?" | Grant Clarke; Harry Akst | 3:43 |
| 4. | "How Long Has This Been Going On" | George Gershwin; Ira Gershwin | 4:20 |
| 5. | "The Man I Love" | G. Gershwin; I. Gershwin | 4:27 |

Side two
| No. | Title | Writer(s) | Length |
|---|---|---|---|
| 1. | "Sonny Boy"/"My Mammy"/"Rock-a-Bye Your Baby with a Dixie Melody" (Jolson medley) | Al Jolson; Buddy DeSylva; Lew Brown; Ray Henderson / Joe Young; Sam M. Lewis; Walter Donaldson / Jean Schwartz; Young; Lewis | 4:12 |
| 2. | "More Than You Know" | Vincent Youmans; Billy Rose; Edward Eliscu | 3:41 |
| 3. | "Why Was I Born" | Jerome Kern; Oscar Hammerstein II | 2:45 |
| 4. | "The Man That Got Away" | Harold Arlen; Ira Gershwin | 4:13 |

== Personnel ==
- Cher – lead vocals
- Sonny Bono – record producer
- Jeff Porcaro – drums
- Dean Parks, Don Peake – guitar
- David Hungate – bass guitar
- David Paich – keyboards
- Joe Sample – keyboards
- Michel Rubini – keyboards
- Jimmy Dale – arrangements
- Ted Dale – conductor
- Albert Harris (tracks A3, A5, B2, B3, B4), Gene Page (track A2), John D'Andrea (track A4), Michel Rubini (track A1), Mundell Lowe – orchestra
- Lenny Roberts – sound engineer
- Bittersweet: The Love Songs Collection (re-issue 1999)
- Re-issue producers: Mike Khouri, Andy McKay
- Compiled by Mike Khouri

== Charts ==
Weekly chart performance for Bittersweet White Light
| Chart (1973) | Peak position |
|---|---|
| US Billboard 200 | 140 |
| US Cash Box Top Pop Albums | 102 |
| US Record World Top 100 LP's | 118 |
