= I Paralyze =

Studio album by Cher
- Released: May 28, 1982
- Recorded: 1982
- Genres: New wave; pop rock; soft rock
- Length: 33:50
- Labels: Columbia; Varèse Sarabande
- Producers: John Farrar; David Wolfert

Cher chronology
Black Rose (1980)	I Paralyze (1982)	Cher (1987)

Singles from I Paralyze
- 1. "Rudy" Released: May 6, 1982; 2. "I Paralyze" Released: 1982

I Paralyze is the seventeenth studio album by American singer-actress Cher, released in 1982 by Columbia Records. It was her only album for the label.

The album was a commercial failure, failing to chart. The album was promoted by the release of two singles, "Rudy", and "I Paralyze", both of which also failed to chart. Following the release of the record, Cher took a five-year hiatus from music to focus on her film career, partly due to the lack of successful albums and singles. She made a comeback in 1987 when she released the Platinum-certified album Cher.

== Recording and production ==
In 1981, Cher recorded a song with Meat Loaf called "Dead Ringer for Love" for his album Dead Ringer; the song was a hit in the UK, but was left off I Paralyze. The album was recorded in 1982, and was produced by John Farrar (of Olivia Newton-John fame) and David Wolfert; it is her first collaboration with composer and producer Desmond Child. The recording sessions were lengthy and demanding, often extending until three in the morning, with Cher demonstrating notable discipline and a willingness to repeat takes until the desired result was achieved. In Geffen Records' official 1987 biography, Cher stated that she disliked the album, that she had no creative control over the project and described the overall experience as negative.

I Paralyze contains various musical styles: the rock style of Black Rose on cuts such as "Walk with Me", "The Book of Love", and "Rudy"; a slight new wave sound in "I Paralyze"; some ballads such as "When the Love Is Gone" and "Do I Ever Cross Your Mind?"; and an "old '80s" style on "Back On the Street Again" (a retitled cover of the Babys' "Back on My Feet Again") and "Games", which was recorded by Lisa Hartman for her 1982 album Letterock.

== Release and promotion ==
The promotion includes appearances on television programs such as American Bandstand and Solid Gold. The release was preceded in the United Kingdom by the release of the single "Rudy", a decision that producer David Wolfert later described as "bad". Wolfert also expressed doubts about the choice of the title track as the lead single, stating that "Walk with Me" would likely have had stronger commercial potential.

The album was released on CD for the first time in 1989 by "The Entertainment Company", Columbia Records, and CBS Records International. Later, in 1999, the album was reissued on the Varèse Sarabande reissue label under license from Sony Music.

== Singles ==
"Rudy" was released in March 1982 as the first single and featured "Do I Ever Cross Your Mind" as its B-side. The original version of "Rudy" was recorded by Italian-French singer Dalida as "Quand je n'aime plus, je m'en vais" in 1981, with the topic and the language changed from French to English. The french song was composed by Pierre Delanoë, Jacques Morali, Henri Belolo and Jeff Barnel. Billboard described "Rudy" as "a midtempo rocker which recalls the pulse and energy of Phil Spector's Wall of Sound", noting the appropriateness of the comparison given that "Cher started out as a background singer for Spector sessions". Bil Carpenter of AllMusic called it as a "girl-group-styled" track and one of the album's standouts. Pop Rescue characterized it as a "rock love song" with "fairly catchy" qualities, and praised Cher for delivering the vocals "with power, and flawlessly". Pop Dose referred to it as a "straight-ahead rock number" but "a little shy in the hooks department". The single failed to chart upon its release.

"I Paralyze" was released as the album's second single. The track was featured in Billboard's Top Single Picks section, where it was classified as "recommended".

== Critical reception ==
Professional ratings
Review scores
Source	Rating
AllMusic	3/5 stars
The Rolling Stone Album Guide	1/5 stars

A review from Billboard noted, "Don't let the punky sunglasses on the cover fool you: this time around Cher stays very much within an Olivia Newton-John/Sheena Easton pop context, with a collection of songs she can easily include in her Las Vegas shows." While acknowledging that "Cher has her detractors," the review concluded that "her musical ability cannot be denied and she handles the A/C adult contemporary material here with aplomb if not sensitivity."

In a retrospective review for AllMusic, Bil Carpenter described I Paralyze as "a strong set" that features "a hardy rhythm section and good range of soft-rock and pop ballads well suited for Cher's vocals." He noted that the album successfully brought the singer "out of an outdated style into modern music," crediting the production work of John Farrar, who was known as Olivia Newton-John's producer. Carpenter highlighted the "girl-group-styled 'Rudy'" and the "piano ballad 'When the Love Is Gone'" as standout tracks.

== Track listing ==
All tracks produced by David Wolfert except "I Paralyze" by John Farrar.

Side one
No.	Title	Writer(s)	Length
1.	"Rudy"	Jacques Morali; Henri Belolo; Fergie Frederiksen; Howie Epstein; James "Jimmy" Hunter; Mark Maierhoffer	3:54
2.	"Games"	Andrea Farber; Vince Melamed	3:57
3.	"I Paralyze"	Farrar; Steve Kipner	3:49
4.	"When the Love Is Gone"	Desmond Child	4:04
5.	"Say What's on Your Mind"	J. Gottschalk	4:06

Side two
No.	Title	Writer(s)	Length
1.	"Back on the Street Again"	Dominic King; Frank Musker; John Waite	3:19
2.	"Walk with Me"	Child; Wolfert	3:32
3.	"The Book of Love"	Child	3:23
4.	"Do I Ever Cross Your Mind"	Billy Burnette; Michael Smotherman	4:13

== Personnel ==
- Cher – lead vocals
- Jai Winding – arranger, keyboards
- Rick Shlosser – drums
- Steve Lukather, Sid McGinnis, Carlos Rios, Thom Rotella – guitar
- Ralph Schuckett – Hammond organ
- Richard Crooks – percussion
- Nathan East – synthesizer, bass guitar
- David Wolfert – synthesizer, guitar, arranger, producer
- Ed Walsh – synthesizer
- Michael Boddicker – synthesizer, vocoder programming
- John Farrar – guitar, backing vocals
- Gary Herbig – saxophone
- Steve George – background vocals
- Tom Kelly – background vocals
- Myrna Mathews – background vocals
- Denise Maynelli DeCaro – background vocals, vocal contractor
- Marti McCall – background vocals
- Richard Page – background vocals

Technical

- Executive producer: Charles Koppelman
- Producer: John Farrar, David Wolfert
- Reissue producers: Cary E. Mansfield, Mike Khouri
- Reissue liner notes: Mike Khouri
- Engineers: Dennis Ferrante, John Arrias
- Mixing: Lee Decarlo
- Remixing: Dan Hersch
- Mastering supervisor, tape research: Bill Inglot
- Art direction: Nancy Greenberg
- Reissue design: Matt B.
- Photography: Harry Langdon
