= Pirate (Cher song) =

Single by Cher

from the album Cherished
- B-side: "Send the Man Over"
- Released: 1976
- Recorded: 1976
- Studio: Larrabee North (North Hollywood, CA)
- Genre: Pop
- Length: 3:10
- Label: Warner Bros.
- Songwriters: Steve Dorff; Larry Herbstritt; Gary Harju
- Producer: Snuff Garrett

Cher singles chronology
"Long Distance Love Affair" (1976)	"Pirate" (1976)	"War Paint and Soft Feathers" (1977)

"Pirate" is a song recorded by American singer and actress Cher, released as the first single from her 14th album Cherished (1977). The song debuted at #96 on the Billboard Hot 100 on the issue date of January 15, peaking at #93 the following week.

== Critical reception ==
In its review, Record World wrote that "Cher has long been overdue for a hit single, but here she comes up with a great combination of material, arrangement and performance".

== Charts ==
Weekly chart performance for "Pirate".
Chart (1977)	Peak position
US Billboard Hot 100	93
