= Superpak Vol. I and II =

Superpak Volume I

Greatest hits album by Cher
- Released: 1971
- Recorded: 1965–68
- Genres: Pop; folk; rock
- Length: 76:00 (vol. 1); 61:51 (vol. 2)
- Label: United Artists
- Producer: Sonny Bono

Cher chronology
Chér (1971)	Superpak Volume I (1971)	Foxy Lady (1972)

Superpak Volume II
- Cover of Volume II released the same year.

Superpak Vol. I and II are the second and third official compilation albums by American singer/actress Cher respectively. These compilations most prominently feature Cher's 1966 single, "Bang Bang (My Baby Shot Me Down)", as well as her 1965 debut single, "All I Really Want to Do". The rest of the albums feature other singles by Cher from the 1960s. Among those singles are: "Needles and Pins", "Alfie", "Hey Joe", and many more. All the songs that are sung are covers of the original versions. The first compilation was the fifth collection in United Artists's "Superpak" series.

== Critical reception ==
Professional ratings
Review scores
Source	Rating
AllMusic	2/5 stars

Superpak Vol. II

Cash Box wrote that Cher was "one of those talented performers who isn't restricted by musical styles", and described the two-record set (Vol. II) as "thoroughly delightful" and "a winner". RPM wrote that listeners "don't have to be a Cher fan to appreciate the great lineup of songs on this two-disc set". Record World described the two-record set as "a must for the millions of Cher fans". Billboard wrote that the label would "undoubtedly prove equally as strong in sales" with the two-record set and highlighted her "strong readings" of songs like "Ol' Man River", "Our Day Will Come", "Don't Think Twice, It's All Right", "The Impossible Dream (The Quest)", and "The Twelfth of Never".

== Commercial performance ==
According to Cash Box Chér (Volume I) was among the best sellers of "Superpak" series.

== Track listing ==
=== Volume 1 ===
Side A
No.	Title	Writer(s)	Original album	Length
1.	"All I Really Want to Do"	Bob Dylan	All I Really Want to Do, 1965	2:56
2.	"The Bells of Rhymney"	Pete Seeger; Idris Davies	All I Really Want to Do	3:08
3.	"Girl Don't Come"	Chris Andrews	All I Really Want to Do	1:50
4.	"Come and Stay with Me"	Jackie DeShannon	All I Really Want to Do	2:39
5.	"Blowin' in the Wind"	Dylan	All I Really Want to Do	3:30
6.	"Needles and Pins"	Sonny Bono; Jack Nitzsche	All I Really Want to Do	2:35

Side B
No.	Title	Writer(s)	Original album	Length
1.	"Bang Bang (My Baby Shot Me Down)"	Bono	The Sonny Side of Chér, 1966	3:40
2.	"Elusive Butterfly"	Bob Lind	The Sonny Side of Chér	2:26
3.	"Time"	Michael Merchant	The Sonny Side of Chér	3:14
4.	"Where Do You Go"	Bono	The Sonny Side of Chér	3:12
5.	"Until It's Time for You to Go"	Buffy St. Marie^{[a]}	Chér, 1966	2:48
6.	"Will You Love Me Tomorrow"	Carole King; Gerry Goffin	Chér	2:55

Side C
No.	Title	Writer(s)	Original album	Length
1.	"Alfie"	Hal David; Burt Bacharach	Chér	2:47
2.	"Homeward Bound"	Paul Simon	Chér	2:24
3.	"Catch the Wind"	Donovan	Chér	2:14
4.	"Reason to Believe"	Tim Hardin	Backstage, 1968	2:25
5.	"A House Is Not a Home"	David; Bacharach	Backstage	2:14
6.	"You Don't Have to Say You Love Me"	Vicki Wickham; Pino Donaggio; Simon Napier-Bell; Vito Pallavicini^{[b]}	Chér	2:45

Side D
No.	Title	Writer(s)	Original album	Length
1.	"You'd Better Sit Down Kids^{[c]}"	Bono	With Love, Chér, 1967	3:42
2.	"Sunny"	Bobby Hebb	Chér	3:08
3.	"There but for Fortune"	Phil Ochs	With Love, Chér	3:23
4.	"Do You Believe in Magic"	John Sebastian	Backstage	2:37
5.	"Mama (When My Dollies Have Babies)"	Bono	With Love, Chér	3:24
6.	"The Click Song"	Miriam Makeba	Backstage	2:54
Total length:				76:00

=== Volume 2 ===
Side A
No.	Title	Writer(s)	Original album	Length
1.	"Our Day Will Come"	Bob Hilliard; Mort Garson	The Sonny Side of Chér	2:12
2.	"The Times, They Are a-Changin'"	Dylan	With Love, Chér	3:07
3.	"Come to Your Window"	Lind	The Sonny Side of Chér	2:45
4.	"I Wasn't Ready"	Malcolm Rebennack; Jessie Hill	Backstage	3:00
5.	"Hey Joe"	William Moses Roberts	With Love, Chér	3:26
6.	"Milord"	Georges Moustaki; Bunny Lewis; Marguerite Monnot	The Sonny Side of Chér	2:33

Side B
No.	Title	Writer(s)	Original album	Length
1.	"Don't Think Twice, It's All Right"	Dylan	All I Really Want to Do	2:24
2.	"She Thinks I Still Care"	Dickey Lee Lipscomb^{[a]}	All I Really Want to Do	2:12
3.	"The Cruel War"	Peter Yarrow; Paul Stookey	Chér	3:20
4.	"A Young Girl"	Charles Aznavour; Oscar Brown Jr.; Robert Chauvigny^{[e]}	The Sonny Side of Chér	3:00
5.	"Song Called Children"	Bob West	Backstage	3:35
6.	"The Girl from Ipanema"	Antônio Jobim; Norman Gimbel; Vinicius DeMoraes	The Sonny Side of Chér	2:10

Side C
No.	Title	Writer(s)	Original album	Length
1.	"Ol' Man River"	Jerome Kern; Clendenning Hammerstein II	The Sonny Side of Chér	2:47
2.	"The Impossible Dream"	Joe Darion; Mitch Leigh	Backstage	2:25
3.	"Cry Myself to Sleep"	Michael Gordon	All I Really Want to Do	2:20
4.	"Carnival"	Hugo Perette^{[f]}; Luigi Creatore; George Weiss; Luiz Bonfá	Backstage	3:26
5.	"Twelfth of Never"	Jerry Livingston; Paul Francis Webster	Chér	2:14
6.	"Like a Rolling Stone"	Dylan	The Sonny Side of Chér	3:53

Side D
No.	Title	Writer(s)	Original album	Length
1.	"It's Not Unusual"	Gordon Mills; Les Reed	The Sonny Side of Chér	2:07
2.	"I Want You"	Dylan	Chér	2:49
3.	"I Will Wait for You"	Michel Legrand; Norman Gimbel	With Love, Chér	3:02
4.	"Take Me for a Little While"	Trade Martin	Backstage	2:40
5.	"Sing for Your Supper"	Richard Rodgers; Lorenz Hart	With Love, Chér	2:34
6.	"Go Now"	Milton Bennet; Larry Banks	Backstage	3:56

Notes

- ^a Buffy Sainte-Marie is incorrectly credited as Buffy St. Marie.
- ^b Vito Pallavicini is uncredited.
- ^c You Better Sit Down Kids is incorrectly titled as You'd Better Sit Down Kids.
- ^d Dickey Lee is incorrectly credited as D. L. Lipscomb.
- ^e Robert Chauvigny is uncredited.
- ^f Hugo Peretti is incorrectly credited as Perette.

== Personnel ==
- Cher - lead vocals
- Sonny Bono - producer

== Charts ==
Weekly chart performance for Superpak Vol. I
Chart (1972)	Peak position
US Billboard 200	92

Weekly chart performance for Superpak Vol. II
Chart (1972)	Peak position
US Billboard 200	95
