= Black Rose (Black Rose album) =

Studio album by Black Rose
- Released: August 21, 1980
- Recorded: 1980
- Studios: Sunset Sound Recorders, Hollywood, California; Westlake Audio, West Hollywood, California
- Genre: Rock
- Length: 33:17
- Labels: Casablanca; EMI (reissue)
- Producer: James Newton Howard

Cher chronology
| Prisoner (1979) | Black Rose (1980) | I Paralyze (1982) |

Black Rose is the debut studio album by the rock band Black Rose, whose lead singer was American singer-actress Cher. In 1980, Cher formed the rock band Black Rose with guitarist and then-partner Les Dudek. To blend in and avoid overshadowing the group with her celebrity status, she adopted a punk-inspired look, cutting her signature long hair. Although she was the lead singer, she chose not to take top billing to present the band as equal.

The album was released on August 21, 1980, by Casablanca Records, her final project on the label. Despite TV appearances and a mini tour, the band struggled to book concerts. Black Rose received poor reviews; Cher told Rolling Stone that critics "didn't attack the record, they attacked me. It was like, 'How dare Cher sing rock & roll?'" Unlike Cher's previous solo records (such as Take Me Home), the album was a commercial failure. It failed to chart worldwide. Black Rose disbanded in 1981.

== Development ==
In 1980, Cher and her part-time boyfriend Les Dudek wanted to form a band called Black Rose. The band, before signing a contract with Casablanca Records, was an independent rock band that played in small clubs around Los Angeles and tried to make it without trading on Cher's celebrity. Besides Cher, the other band members were Les Dudek, Gary Ferguson, Michael Finnigan, Warren Ham, Rocket Ritchotte and Trey Thompson.

Black Rose, the last of Cher's albums released by the Casablanca Records, was produced by James Newton Howard. Her name never appeared on the album cover and Cher's face was only seen in a band photo on the back cover. The album is Cher's first album with a rock sound, that would characterize her future Geffen Records-era albums. The album was a flop and Cher fans were unaware of the project. After the failure of the album, the band broke up the following year.

In Germany, Spectrum Records re-released the Black Rose album, completely intact, for the first time on a CD. It was packaged with a photo of Cher singing in concert and marketed as a Cher album, instead of as a Black Rose album. In August 2020, a remastered version was released on Rock Candy Records for the album's 40th anniversary. It was remastered by Jon Astley.

There were rumors about a subsequent album, recorded during 1980 and 1981, which would have contained some songs sung live in their mini-tour, "The Black Rose Show", such as "Ain’t Got No Money" (a Frankie Miller song, also covered by Bob Seger) and "Dirty Old Man", but the project was cancelled. A version of "Ain't Got No Money" was confirmed to be recorded in the studio in early 1980, but was scrapped and remains unreleased. "Don't Trust That Woman", a song written by Cher and Les Dudek, was also considered for the second album. Dudek recorded the song for his 1981 album Gypsy Ride, and a song with the same lyrics was later recorded by Elton John.

In 2024 an unreleased early take of "Young And Pretty" surfaced on YouTube.

== Promotion ==
The album was promoted on The Tonight Show Starring Johnny Carson and the band performed "Never Should've Started" and "Julie" but both lip-synched. The album was also promoted at the Midnight Special with four performances: "Never Should've Started", "Julie", "You Know It" and the Frankie Miller cover "Ain't Got No Money" all the songs were sung live. Videos of the performance have been available on YouTube since March 2009. The album was also promoted on November 7, 1980 in The Merv Griffin Show where the band performed "Never Should've Started".

=== The Black Rose Show ===
To support the album and to lift sales in 1980, the Black Rose band and Cher did a mini tour called The Black Rose Show performed only in North America. The setlist for the show contained: "Intro" "Never Should've Started", "Julie", # "Take it from the Boys", "88 Degrees", "Déjà Vu (Da Voodoo's In You)", "Fast Company", "You Know It", "Ain't Got No Money", a little band introduction, and "Dirty Old Man". For six East Coast concert dates, Black Rose was the opening act for Hall & Oates. The costumes for the show were designed by Bob Mackie. The band performed in Pennsylvania, Central Park, Garden State Arts Center in Holmdel Township and elsewhere.

Shows

The Black Rose Band

| Date | City | Country | Venue |
|---|---|---|---|
North America
| August 15, 1980 | Columbia | United States | Merriweather Post Pavilion |
| August 16, 1980 | Philadelphia | United States | Mann Music Center |
| August 17, 1980 | Holmdel Township | United States | Garden State Arts Center |
| August 20, 1980 | Bethlehem | United States | Stabler Arena |
| August 21, 1980 | North Tonawanda | United States | Melody Fair Music Theater |
| August 23, 1980 | New York | United States | Dr Pepper Central Park Music Festival |

=== Singles ===
"Never Should've Started" was released as a single (Casablanca, #NB 2312), featuring "Young and Pretty" as its B-side. Cash Box noted that although Cher "may prefer to stay in the background, from an image standpoint", she is "right out front vocally" on "Never Should've Started", alongside musicians such as Les Dudek, Ron Ritchotte and Gary Ferguson. Record World described the song as a "powerhouse rocker", noting that Cher "poses as a sweet little kitten on the intro and then rips open", while praising the "crack band" for delivering "loads of AOR-pop appeal".

== Critical reception ==
The reviews were mixed, many critics questioning Cher's credibility and drawing comparisons to other New Wave rock groups, particularly Blondie. Cash Box described Black Rose as a "slick power rock" album with "enough rocking punch to satisfy AOR programmers". Billboard magazine said that "[...] it shapes a New Wave style that fits the midtempo rock mode with which the main group members are associated" and about Cher "especially well done though Cher's vocals are emotional and full of life on the entire disk". People magazine said that "Cher's quivering, over-mannered vocals on this LP need all the help they can get, and she gets more than she deserves" and "This album could be vastly improved, rerecorded by the Group with No Singer".

== Track listing ==
| No. | Title | Writer(s) | Length |
|---|---|---|---|
| 1. | "Never Should've Started" | David Foster; David Paich; James Newton Howard; Valerie Carter | 4:14 |
| 2. | "Julie" | Bernie Taupin; Mike Chapman | 3:21 |
| 3. | "Take It From the Boys" | Carole Bayer Sager; Bruce Roberts | 4:59 |
| 4. | "We All Fly Home" | Johnny Vastano; Vince Poncia | 3:56 |
| 5. | "88 Degrees" | Phil Brown | 5:57 |
| 6. | "You Know It" | Les Dudek | 3:20 |
| 7. | "Young and Pretty" | Allee Willis; Richard "T Bear" Gerstein | 4:03 |
| 8. | "Fast Company" | Fred Mollin; Larry Mollin | 3:47 |

== Personnel ==
- Cher - lead vocals
- Les Dudek - guitars, vocals
- Ron "Rocket" Ritchotte - guitars, background vocals
- Phil Brown - additional guitar on "88 Degrees"
- Mike Finnigan - keyboards, background vocals
- James Newton Howard - record producer, synthesizer, keyboards
- Michael Boddicker - synthesizer, keyboards
- Steve Porcaro - synthesizer, keyboards
- David Paich - keyboards, background vocals
- Trey Thompson - bass
- Gary Ferguson - drums
- Max Gronenthal - background vocals
- Warren Ham - background vocals

- John Townsend - background vocals
- Anne Streer - production coordinator
- Mick Mizausky - engineer
- Tom Knox - engineer
- Dana Latham - engineer
- Bob Schaper - engineer
- Skip Sailor - engineer assistance
- Gene Meros - engineer assistance
- Terry Christian - engineer assistance
- Bill Schnee - mixing
- Mike Reese - mastering
- Kosh - art direction, design
- Aaron Rapoport - photography

== Charts ==
Weekly chart performance for Black Rose
| Chart (1980) | Peak position |
|---|---|
| US Record World Albums | 158 |
