= Cherished =

Studio album by Cher
- Released: June 4, 1977
- Recorded: 1976–1977
- Studios: Larrabee North (North Hollywood, California)
- Genre: Pop
- Length: 29:19
- Label: Warner Bros.
- Producers: Snuff Garrett; Al Capps

Cher chronology
I'd Rather Believe in You (1976)	Cherished (1977)	Two the Hard Way (1977)

Singles from Cherished
- 1. "Pirate" Released: 1976; 2. "War Paint and Soft Feathers" Released: 1977

Cherished is the fourteenth studio album by American singer-actress Cher, released on June 4, 1977, as Cher's final studio album released by Warner Bros. Records. This album, like several other predecessors, was a commercial failure and failed to chart. The album was promoted by the release of the lead single, "Pirate" which charted at No. 93 on the Billboard Hot 100 and a second single, "War Paint and Soft Feathers" which failed to chart. "Pirate" was the only single from the 70s Warner era to chart despite the album being her lowest selling album of her entire career.

== Album information ==
Cherished was the last Cher studio album produced by Snuff Garrett. Although The Cher Show was a top 10 ratings hit, the 1975-77 period was unsuccessful for her, and Cherished did no better than its predecessors, Stars and I'd Rather Believe in You. The album sold very little, failed in the charts and was ignored by critics and fans. Also, Cher was dissatisfied with the final results of the album, and in an interview, she said that she never enjoyed making this album and only made it because of the contract deal with Warner Bros.

The style of the record recalls past hits "Dark Lady" and "Half Breed". Cherished is also Cher's first album without her name on the cover because the title of the album is a pun of the Cher name.

As with her other two Warner Bros. releases, Cherished has never had a legitimate reissue in any format. According to Billboard, Cher owned this album's master rights and Warner had no right to reissue. However, in August 20, 2021, Cher released all 10 tracks, "restored and remastered", on her YouTube channel.

== Singles ==
Two unsuccessful singles were released. The first was "Pirate", which reached No. 93 in Billboard. This song was also the first track on some versions of I'd Rather Believe in You, and in Australia the track was retitled "Images".

A follow-up to "Pirate", "War Paint and Soft Feathers", did not chart. About the single, Record World wrote that it was "the sort of melodramatic pop song Cher has hit with time and again", adding that "top 40 should accept it without reservation". Cash Box wrote that the song was "well suited to Cher's voice", noting its "accurate […] Indian theme to the smallest details of lyric and percussion".

== Critical reception ==
Professional ratings
Review scores
Source	Rating
AllMusic	2/5 stars

The Los Angeles Times noted that "Cher is pleasant but again unchallenged by the material." Billboard wrote that "the colorfully-shaded sagas of down-on-their-luck ladies again highlight the usual mix of torch songs, hook-laden catchy pop numbers and soft MOR", adding that "the arrangements […] are full-bodied and feature nice occasional touches of Indian and cajun music". Cash Box said that her collaboration with Snuff Garrett gave the album "a kind of 'welcome home, good-to-be-back' feeling increasing the appeal of a lady who seems to have an abundance of that quality already," and that even "though her vocals are strong and emotion-filled, it is indeed the sounds on the outer edges that give this album its delicate audio shadings, that like the colors in an Impressionist painting, highlight the subject matter in a carefully-woven intricate pattern." Record World included the album in its "Album Picks" list on August 20, deeming Cher's collaboration with producer Snuff Garrett "a particularly complementary one as Garrett always seems to be able to entice a powerful performance from her", and thought that "there is a soft edge to the melodies which should appeal to Cher's large TV audience".

== Track listing ==
Side one
No.	Title	Writer(s)	Length
1.	"Pirate"	Steve Dorff; Larry Herbstritt; Gary Harju	3:10
2.	"He Was Beautiful"	Gloria Sklerov; Harry Lloyd	2:51
3.	"War Paint and Soft Feathers"	Cloretta Kay Miller; Sandy Pinkard; Al Capps	3:03
4.	"Love the Devil Out of Ya"	John Durrill; Doc Pomus	2:15
5.	"She Loves to Hear the Music"	Peter Allen; Carole Bayer Sager	3:10

Side two
No.	Title	Writer(s)	Length
1.	"L.A. Plane"	Harju; Herbstritt	3:38
2.	"Again"	Joe Allen	2:30
3.	"Dixie"	Durrill; Pinkard	2:26
4.	"Send the Man Over"	Cliff Crofford; Snuff Garrett	3:47
5.	"Thunderstorm"	Durrill; Pinkard	2:35

== Personnel ==
- Cher – lead vocals
- Steve Dorff, Al Capps – arranger, conductor
- Snuff Garrett – record producer
- Lenny Roberts – sound engineer
- Randy Tominaga – assistant engineer
- Taavi Mote – assistant engineer
- Harry Langdon – photography
