= The Way of Love =

French song by Jacques Dieval

"The Way of Love" is a song written by Jacques ("Jack") Dieval, with English lyrics by Al Stillman. It was originally a 1960 French song titled "J'ai le mal de toi", first recorded in English by Kathy Kirby in 1965. The best-known English version was by Cher, whose recording reached No. 7 in the US.

== First versions ==
"Parlez-moi de lui"

Single by Dalida
- Released: 1966
- Genre: chanson, pop
- Label: Barclay
- Songwriters: Jack Diéval, Michel Rivgauche

"Parlez-moi de lui"

Song by Françoise Hardy

from the album Françoise Hardy
- Released: 1968
- Genre: chanson, pop
- Producer: Arthur Greenslade

Originally written by Jack Diéval with French lyrics by Michel Rivgauche the song was introduced as 'J'ai le mal de toi'. It was written for the singer Frédérica in 1960, who took part that year in the national elimination rounds of France for the Eurovision Song Contest. This song was not selected and was evidently not recorded by Frédérica. Subsequently, the song was performed on Belgium's BRT radio station by vocalist Lily Castel, singing it in the "Musik Ohne Grenzen" competition; Castel was backed by Fernand Terby's orchestra with Jacques Dieval providing piano accompaniment. The first evident recording of "J'ai le mal de toi" was made in 1964 by Colette Deréal.

In June 1965 the English rendering entitled "The Way of Love" was issued in the UK as a single by Kathy Kirby; lyricist Al Stillman had previously provided the lyrics for Kirby's English language hit version of "Malagueña" entitled "You're the One". Recorded by Kirby with her regular collaborators: musical director Ivor Raymonde and producer Peter Sullivan, "The Way of Love" failed to reach the UK Top 50 but became a regional hit in the United States reaching No. 88 nationally.

In 1966 a new French version, also by lyricist Michel Rivgauche, was recorded by Dalida as "Parlez-moi de lui" ("Tell me about him"). This rendition slightly alters the original melody. This adaptation was covered by Françoise Hardy on her 1968 album Françoise Hardy (commonly known as Comment te dire adieu).

=== Track listings ===
==== Colette Deréal version ====
7-inch EP Ma chance c'est toi / Le Tyrolien / J'ai le mal de toi / Toi et ton sourire (1965, Polydor 27 190)

A1. "Ma chance c'est toi"
A2. "Le Tyrolien"
B1. "J'ai le mal de toi"
B2. "Toi et ton sourire"

==== Dalida version ====
7-inch EP Je t'appelle encore / Modesty / Parlez-moi de lui / Baisse un peu la radio (1966, Barclay 70 997)

A1. "Je t'appelle encore" (2:48)
A2. "Modesty" (2:19)
B1. "Parlez-moi de lui" (2:48)
B2. "Baisse un peu la radio" (2:40)

7-inch jukebox promo single (1966, Barclay 60718)

A. "Parlez-moi de lui" (2:48)
B. "Modesty" (2:19)

=== Chart performance ===
"Parlez-moi de lui" / "Baisse un peu la radio" by Dalida

Chart (1966)	Peak position
Belgium (Ultratop 50 Wallonia)	45

== Cher version ==
"The Way of Love"

Single by Cher

from the album Gypsys, Tramps & Thieves
- B-side: "Don't Put It on Me"
- Released: January 22, 1972
- Studio: Larrabee Sound Studios (West Hollywood, California)
- Genre: Pop
- Length: 2:29
- Label: MCA
- Songwriters: Jacques Dieval; Al Stillman
- Producer: Snuff Garrett

Cher singles chronology
"Gypsys, Tramps & Thieves" (1971)	"The Way of Love" (1972)	"Living in a House Divided" (1972)

Produced by Snuff Garrett and released on January 22, 1972 as the second single from Gypsys, Tramps & Thieves, perhaps the most well-known version of "The Way of Love" was recorded by Cher. Her version spent three weeks within the top ten of the Billboard Hot 100, reaching a peak of number 7 and ultimately selling almost one million copies. Billboard ranked it as the No. 62 song for 1972. The magazine also described the song as "an emotion-packed ballad loaded with Top 40 and MOR potency", noting that Cher follows her number-one hit with "a change of pace".

Allmusic wrote a favorable retrospective review: "some great moments, among them a career highlight in the two-and-a-half-minute opening track, "The Way of Love." The Stillman/Dieval tune was originally a British hit for Kathy Kirby, and both Cher and Kirby drove the song right by the censors. The song is either about a woman expressing her love for another woman, or a woman saying au revoir to a gay male she loved—in either case this is not a mother to daughter heart-to-heart: "What will you do/When he sets you free/Just the way that you/Said good-bye to me." and also added this to the end of review "her solo material could soar to heights not possible in a partnership -- "The Way of Love" being one example." Rhapsody highlighted the song and called it "sexually ambiguous."

=== Live performances ===
Cher performed the song on the following concert tours:

- Take Me Home Tour
- Do You Believe? Tour
- The Farewell Tour (sung on the first leg, the second leg, the third leg and the final two shows of the tour)
- Cher at the Colosseum (removed during the third leg, and replaced with "Love Hurts")

=== Charts and sales ===
==== Weekly charts ====
1972 weekly chart performance for "The Way of Love" by Cher
Chart (1972)	Peak position
Australian Singles (Kent Music Report)	42
Canadian RPM Top Singles	6
Quebec (ADISQ)	44
Spain Top 40 Radio	36
US Billboard Hot 100	7
US Billboard Easy Listening	2
US Cash Box Top 100	9

==== Year-end charts ====
Year-end chart performance for "The Way of Love" by Cher
Chart (1972)	Position
Canada RPM	53
US Billboard Hot 100	62
US Billboard Top Easy Listening Singles	23

==== Certifications and sales ====
Certifications and sales for "The Way of Love" by Cher
Region	Certification	Certified units/sales
United States	—	975,000

== Other versions ==
- Dalida, in 1966, also made an Italian version of the song entitled "Il mio male sei" (You are my evil); curiously, the song was included on the back of the album Bang Bang, the Italian cover of Cher's hit of that same year.
- Johnny Mathis Released this song before Cher in 1969 on the Album “Love Theme from Romeo & Juliet”
- Famous heavy metal vocalist Ronnie James Dio recorded what is thought to be one of the earliest English covers of the song in a 1964 single with his band Ronnie Dio and the Prophets.
- A Dutch-language version of the song entitled "Je doet me pijn" - lyrics by Ernst van Altena - was recorded in 1965 by Conny Vandenbos.
- Another Dutch-language version "Ik verlang naar jou" - lyrics by Will Ferdy - was recorded by Belgian singer Will Ferdy in 1967.
- Roslyn Kind recorded an English version with completely different lyrics - also by Al Stillman - entitled "Can I Stop the Rain?" on her 1968 album Give Me You.

A Spanish version, Háblame de el was released in 1970 by Lissette and became a hit in Puerto Rico and the Latin communities in the USA.

- Shirley Bassey featured "The Way of Love" on 1972's And I Love You So.
- Also in 1972, Vikki Carr included the song on her The First Time Ever I Saw Your Face album which was produced by Snuff Garrett.
- The song "It's Impossible" is sometimes identified as a being an alternate translation of "The Way of Love" but officially the two songs are distinct - although it is claimed that "Somos Novios" is a plagiarism of the original version of the song, "J'ai le mal de toi".
