= Not Commercial =

Studio album by Cher
- Released: November 8, 2000
- Recorded: 1994
- Genre: Folk rock
- Length: 40:47
- Labels: Artistdirect; Isis
- Producers: Cher; Bruce Roberts

Cher chronology
The Greatest Hits (1999)	Not Commercial (2000)	Living Proof (2001)

Not Commercial (stylized as not.com.mercial) is the twenty-third studio album by American singer-actress Cher. It was released on November 8, 2000, exclusively through Cher.com, Isis Records and Artist Direct. Cher wrote the album in 1994 while attending a semiannual songwriters' workshop hosted by entertainment executive Miles Copeland III in his castle in France. Upon returning to the United States, Cher enlisted members of David Letterman's CBS Orchestra to record the album. After completing it, she presented the album to her recording company, which declined the material for being "not commercial". Cher kept the album for six years before deciding to release it through the Internet only.

The album's content was deemed "very un-Cher like" and dark, with the singer elaborating she did not have any expectations for the album, explaining she was releasing it for those who might be interested. Not Commercial was well received by music critics. Controversy arose when the lyrics of the song "Sisters of Mercy", which refers to nuns as "daughters of Hell" and "masters of pain", flustered religious groups. A contest was set for those who bought the album, and received the chance to win a trip to meet Cher in London or win her doll.

== Background ==
In 1994, Cher attended a semiannual songwriters' workshop hosted by entertainment executive Miles Copeland III in his castle in France. "I'd been writing poetry for years and years, but never thought of it to be used as music. But I'd just written a poem about Kurt Cobain and took it with me and a couple of other things", she said about being inspired to write songs. There, she met singer and songwriter Bruce Roberts, and together they wrote 10 songs in five days. After the workshop, Cher enlisted members of David Letterman's CBS Orchestra and recorded an album within a week in New York, doing her 10 songs plus two others. However, after presenting them to the head of her company, Rob Dickens of Warner Music UK, he refused to release the material, as he felt it was "nice, but not commercial" enough. She then went on to release her twenty-first studio album It's a Man's World a year after under the label.

After the commercial success of Believe (1998), Cher decided to release Not Commercial through the Internet. She explained her idea saying, "I don't know that [the album] belongs any place else. [...] I think that the Internet is a place that at least it doesn't infringe on anyone else's life and if you want to go there you can go there and check it out, and if you don't want to be bothered by it you don't even have to know it's in the universe". The singer described the content of the album as being "personal" and "very un-Cher like. But if people really knew me, it is very Cher. But it's so [expletive] dark". However, she did not have any expectations for the album, explaining she did it for herself, and wanted to share the material with people who might be interested. A contest was set for those who bought the album. Three copies included a "golden ticket" and five copies a "silver ticket", inspired by the film Willy Wonka & the Chocolate Factory. Winners of the golden ticket were awarded a trip for two to meet Cher in London, while the silver ticket holders received a Cher doll from Mattel.

== Composition ==
"We put that song out in 1970 and no one would play it because they said it was un-American, because I'm singing the part of a soldier that's in Vietnam dying and those are his last words. So no one ever got to hear it, so I just thought that would be a good thing [to include], because that wasn't commercial either".

— Cher taking about "Classified 1A".

The album opens with a "yearning ballad" called "Still", in which the singer sings about an "anguished relationship with a married man". The second song, "Sisters of Mercy", was written inspired by the time Cher lived in a Catholic orphanage surrounded by nuns, and its lyrics refer to them as "daughters of hell", "masters of pain" and "a cruel and heartless mob". The following track "Runnin'" is described by the singer as her "in a nutshell, isn't it!". Fourth track "Born With the Hunger" is one of the two songs not composed by Cher; it was written instead by her friend Shirley Eikhard around the time of the album's recording sessions, and features slide guitar sounds. The fifth song, "(The Fall) Kurt's Blues", was based on a poem written after singer Kurt Cobain committed suicide. During the song, Cher sings "The good news, if there's any/that you ever lived at all/But our country kills its heroes/we just raise them for the fall".

The following track "With or Without You" was described as a "simple, soulful ballad" with Cher's "distinctive" timbre, while seventh song "Fit to Fly" was thought to recall "late-'80s, Heart of Stone-era" Cher and lyrically salutes soldiers. The eighth track "Disaster Cake" was written by the singer about one of her daughter's former girlfriends. "Our Lady of San Francisco", the following track, is about feeling "self-recrimination for thoughtlessly stepping over a homeless woman on a sidewalk". The closing song on the album "Classified 1A" was written by Sonny Bono in 1971. It is about a dying soldier in Vietnam and was included on UK editions of Cher's eponymous 1971 album but was not released elsewhere because it was deemed "un-American".

== Critical reception ==
Professional ratings
Review scores
Source	Rating
AllMusic	3/5 stars
The Daily Vault	positive
Entertainment Weekly	B−

Not Commercial received positive reviews from music critics. AllMusic's Jose F. Promis commented that the songs "prove effective, and the album is a must for the singer's legions of fans", despite being "tad muddled", and noting its "1970s singer/songwriter feel" and its "somewhat country and twangy, other times somewhat bluesy, but always completely different from her previous effort Believe" sound. David Browne from Entertainment Weekly magazine rated the album as B−, saying "whether telling us she's 'always pushed it to the limit', spewing the F-word, or castigating our 'heartless, godless culture' in her Kurt Cobain tribute(!), she is, not surprisingly, neither Bono nor (Sonny) Bono", and called the song as "sullen, mid-tempo bunch, modestly hooky at best". Mark Millan also gave Not Commercial a positive review, calling it as "fantastic album and one that Cher should have received far more credit for than she did", noting that none of the eight songs she co-wrote were "corny or cliché" and that her voice "has never sounded more soulful and versatile than it did during the mid to late '90s, and it is in glorious form throughout this collection of songs". He finished the review saying "there really is no end to her talents", and he hoped "there will be more songs from Cher's pen in the future".

== Track listing ==
No.	Title	Writer(s)	Length
1.	"Still"	Cher; Bruce Roberts; Bob Thiele	6:15
2.	"Sisters of Mercy"	Cher; Pat MacDonald; Roberts	5:01
3.	"Runnin'"	Cher; MacDonald; Roberts	3:56
4.	"Born with the Hunger"	Shirley Eikhard	4:05
5.	"(The Fall) Kurt's Blues"	Cher; MacDonald; Roberts	5:17
6.	"With or Without You"	Cher	3:45
7.	"Fit to Fly"	Cher; Doug Millett; Kevin Savigar	3:53
8.	"Disaster Cake"	Cher; MacDonald; Roberts	3:25
9.	"Our Lady of San Francisco"	Cher; Michael Garvin; Rich Wayland	2:15
10.	"Classified 1A" (bonus track)	Sonny Bono	2:55
Total length:			40:47

== Personnel ==
Credits and personnel adapted from AllMusic.

- Cher – vocals, composer, producer
- Bruce Roberts – producer
- Sonny Bono – composer
- Michael Garvin – composer
- Pat McDonald – composer
- Doug Millett – composer
- Bruce Roberts – composer
- Kevin Savigar – composer
- Bob Thiele – composer
- Rich Wayland – composer
