= Dancing Queen (album) =

Studio album by Cher
- Released: September 28, 2018
- Recorded: October 2017 – August 2018
- Studios: Angel (London); Metrophonic (London); Mono Music (Stockholm)
- Genre: Dance-pop
- Length: 40:05
- Label: Warner Bros.
- Producers: Benny Andersson; Mark Taylor

Cher chronology
| Closer to the Truth (2013) | Dancing Queen (2018) | Christmas (2023) |

Singles from Dancing Queen
- 1. "Gimme! Gimme! Gimme! (A Man After Midnight)" Released: August 9, 2018; 2. "SOS" Released: August 23, 2018

Dancing Queen is the twenty-sixth studio album by American singer Cher, released by Warner Bros. Records on September 28, 2018. It was Cher's first album in five years, following Closer to the Truth (2013). The album contains cover versions of songs recorded by Swedish pop group ABBA, with the title referencing their 1976 song "Dancing Queen". The album follows Cher's appearance in the 2018 musical film Mamma Mia! Here We Go Again, based on the music of ABBA.

The album was a critical and commercial success, debuting at number three on the US Billboard 200 with first-week sales of 153,000 album-equivalent units, becoming Cher's highest debut sales week for an album in the United States. The album also peaked within the top ten of charts in another 18 countries, with nine of those being top five entries. As of March 2019, Dancing Queen has been certified gold by Music Canada and silver by BPI.

To promote the album, Cher embarked on the Here We Go Again Tour, which began on September 21, 2018. It also marked her first worldwide tour since Living Proof: The Farewell Tour, which had ended in 2005.

== Background ==
After previously appearing in Mamma Mia! Here We Go Again, for which she recorded "Fernando" and "Super Trouper", Cher was inspired to do an ABBA cover album.

While recording, Cher hinted on her Twitter account that she might be releasing an ABBA cover album. On July 16, 2018, it was officially revealed in an interview with The Today Show that the album would consist of ABBA covers. She further stated:

"After filming Mamma Mia! Here We Go Again, I was reminded again of what great and timeless songs they wrote and started thinking, 'Why not do an album of their music?' The songs were harder to sing than I imagined but I'm so happy with how the music came out. I'm really excited for people to hear it. It's a perfect time." —Cher

Cher also said that "[she has] always liked ABBA and saw the original Mamma Mia! musical on Broadway three times".

In addition to that, Cher was asked about what people can expect from the album. She replied with saying, "It's not what you think of when you think 'ABBA', because [she] did it in a different way."

On August 9, 2018, it was announced that the album would be released on September 28, 2018.

== Singles and promotion ==
=== Singles ===
On August 8, 2018, Cher released a teaser of the album's first single "Gimme! Gimme! Gimme! (A Man After Midnight)" on her Twitter account. The song was released the following day. People who pre-ordered the album on iTunes immediately received a digital copy of the single. The song peaked at number four on the Hot Dance Club Songs chart. An extended version of "Gimme! Gimme! Gimme! (A Man After Midnight)" was released on September 14, 2018.

The second single, "SOS" was released on August 23, 2018. It peaked at number 56 on the Scottish singles chart. A music video for the song was released on September 18, 2018.

=== Live performances ===
Cher performed "SOS" at The Ellen DeGeneres Show in 2018. On September 18, 2019, Cher performed "Waterloo" at the season 14 finale of America's Got Talent, to promote the album and her Here We Go Again Tour.

=== Tour ===
A world tour, titled the Here We Go Again Tour, in support of Dancing Queen, began on September 21, 2018, in Auckland, New Zealand. It was officially announced on May 7, 2018. "Fernando", "Waterloo", and "SOS" were the only songs off the album Cher performed, however.

== Critical reception ==
Professional ratings
Aggregate scores
| Source | Rating |
|---|---|
| AnyDecentMusic? | 6.9/10 |
| Metacritic | 79/100 |
Review scores
| Source | Rating |
| Attitude | 5/5 stars |
| Entertainment Weekly | A− |
| Gay Star News | 4/5 stars |
| Gay Times | 4/5 stars |
| Newsday | 3/4 stars |
| NME | 4/5 stars |
| Rolling Stone | 4/5 stars |
| The Guardian | 4/5 stars |
| The Telegraph | 3/5 stars |
| Idolator | 4/5 stars |

According to Metacritic, which calculated a weighted average score of 79 out of 100 from 10 music critics, the album received "generally favorable reviews". Gay Star News gave the album a positive review, saying: "If she'd approached this collection of ABBA re-recordings with the seriousness of, say, George Michael on the excellent Songs from the Last Century, she'd have been in big trouble. Instead, Dancing Queen is about fun, entertainment, dizzy abandonment. She knows how to please a crowd, while also acknowledging the desires of her die-hard fans." Marc Snetiker from Entertainment Weekly gave the album a favorable review, calling it Cher's "most significant release since 1998’s Believe" and saying that "the album ender, 'One of Us,' is frankly one of Cher’s best recordings in years."

Nick Levine from Gay Times praised Cher's vocals, calling them "glorious [...] – still rich and wonderfully androgynous-sounding" and pointing out that they "drive each song from beginning to end." Rolling Stone's Brittany Spanos commented that "the 72-year-old makes ABBA songs not only sound like they should’ve been written for her in the first place but like they firmly belong in 2018". At Idolator, Mike Wass felt that "every track exudes the glitter, fun and nostalgia of a bygone era" and that "Dancing Queen, while disappointingly brief, covers all bases from dreamy disco moments and emotional ballads."

In a positive review for The Guardian, it was noted that "occasionally Cher uses her trademark Auto-Tune like a crutch [...] but mostly it acts as a kind of interstellar portal that elevates Abba from the dancefloor to the cosmos." In a review for The Times, Will Hodgkinson was less positive; he stated that the album delivered "exactly the results you would expect" and that "There's nothing to dislike, but also nothing to recommend beyond this being a fun, tacky choice for the Christmas party."

Rolling Stone placed Dancing Queen on fifth place of all pop albums released in 2018, as well as placing Cher's version of "The Name of the Game" as the 22nd best song of the year. The album's music video of "SOS" was ranked as the 18th best music video of 2018 by Paper.

=== Accolades ===
Dancing Queen on year-end lists
| Publication | Accolade | Rank | Ref. |
|---|---|---|---|
| Paper | Paper's Top 20 Music Videos of 2018 | 18^{[B]} | |
| Rolling Stone | The 20 Best Pop Albums of 2018 | 5 | |
| Rolling Stone | Rob Sheffield's Top 25 Songs of 2018 | 22^{[A]} | |

^{[A]} for "The Name of the Game"
^{[B]} for "SOS"

== Commercial performance ==
In the US, the album debuted at number three on the Billboard 200 with first-week sales of 153,000 album-equivalent units, becoming Cher's highest debut sales for an album in the United States. It also ties the record for Cher's highest-charting solo album on that chart, which she first reached when her album Closer to the Truth also debuted and peaked at number three. It went on to spend 8 weeks in the chart.

The album also debuted at number two in Canada, Cher's highest peak for a studio album there since 1998's Believe. Dancing Queen went on to be certified gold by Music Canada for sales of over 40,000 copies.

In the UK the album debuted at number two as well, giving Cher her highest-charting studio album there since 1991's Love Hurts, with 22,677 units. The album was certified silver by the British Phonographic Industry (BPI) for selling over 60,000 copies and landed at number 91 on the year end chart for 2018. As of October 2023, Dancing Queen had to-date consumption of over 92,000 units in the UK. In Ireland, the album gave Cher her first top ten album in 20 years when it debuted at number ten.

In Australia the album debuted at number two, making it Cher's highest-charting studio album there since Heart of Stone topped the chart in 1989.

The album also reached the top five in Hungary, peaking at number five, as well as placing 61st in the country's year-end chart.

== Track listing ==
All tracks are written by Benny Andersson, Björn Ulvaeus, and Stig Anderson and produced by Mark Taylor (tracks 1–7 and 9–10) and Benny Andersson (track 8), except where noted.

Dancing Queen track listing
| No. | Title | Writer(s) | Length |
|---|---|---|---|
| 1. | "Dancing Queen" | | 3:42 |
| 2. | "Gimme! Gimme! Gimme! (A Man After Midnight)" | Andersson; Ulvaeus | 4:11 |
| 3. | "The Name of the Game" | | 4:48 |
| 4. | "SOS" | | 3:22 |
| 5. | "Waterloo" | | 2:52 |
| 6. | "Mamma Mia" | | 3:34 |
| 7. | "Chiquitita" | Andersson; Ulvaeus | 5:14 |
| 8. | "Fernando" | Andersson, Taylor^{[a]} | 3:57 |
| 9. | "The Winner Takes It All" | Andersson; Ulvaeus | 4:32 |
| 10. | "One of Us" | Andersson; Ulvaeus | 3:53 |
| Total length: | | | 40:05 |

Notes

- ^{^[a]} signifies a vocal producer

== Personnel ==
Credits for Dancing Queen adapted from AllMusic.

- Benny Andersson – executive producer, keyboards, mixing, piano, producer (all on "Fernando")
- Göran Arnberg – orchestration, transcription
- Chris Barrett – assistant engineer
- Rob Barron – piano
- Mat Bartram – engineer
- Thomas Bowes – orchestra leader
- Matt Brind – string arrangements, string conductor
- Andy Caine – background vocals
- Cher – vocals, concept, executive producer
- Judy Craymer – executive producer
- Björn Engelmann – mastering
- Mats Englund – bass on "Fernando"
- Linn Fijal – assistant engineer
- Matt Furmidge – mixing
- Isobel Griffiths – orchestra contractor
- Jeri Heiden – art direction, design
- Lasse Jonsson – guitar
- Martin Koch – conductor, orchestration
- Per Lindvall – drums on "Fernando"
- Bernard Löhr – engineer, mixing
- London Session Orchestra – orchestration
- Stephen Marcussen – mastering
- Paul Meehan – engineer, keyboards, programming
- Simon Meredith – saxophone
- Machado Cicala Morassut – photography
- Rocco Palladino – bass
- Adam Phillips – guitar
- Hayley Sanderson – background vocals
- Ash Soan – drums
- Nick Steinhardt – art direction, design
- Jörgen Stenberg – percussion
- Mark Taylor – engineer, keyboards, producer, programming, vocal producer
- Björn Ulvaeus – executive producer on "Fernando"
- Lasse Wellander – guitar on "Fernando"

== Charts ==
=== Weekly charts ===
Weekly chart performance for Dancing Queen
| Chart (2018) | Peak position |
|---|---|
| Australian Albums (ARIA) | 2 |
| Austrian Albums (Ö3 Austria) | 4 |
| Belgian Albums (Ultratop Flanders) | 7 |
| Belgian Albums (Ultratop Wallonia) | 19 |
| Canadian Albums (Billboard) | 2 |
| Croatian International Albums (HDU) | 6 |
| Czech Albums (ČNS IFPI) | 10 |
| Danish Vinyl Albums (Hitlisten) | 36 |
| Dutch Albums (Album Top 100) | 18 |
| French Albums (SNEP) | 70 |
| German Albums (Offizielle Top 100) | 5 |
| Greek Albums (IFPI) | 21 |
| Hungarian Albums (MAHASZ) | 5 |
| Irish Albums (IRMA) | 10 |
| Italian Albums (FIMI) | 8 |
| New Zealand Albums (RMNZ) | 2 |
| Polish Albums (ZPAV) | 41 |
| Portuguese Albums (AFP) | 9 |
| Scottish Albums (Official Charts) | 2 |
| Slovak Albums (ČNS IFPI) | 13 |
| South African Albums (RiSA) | 7 |
| Spanish Albums (Promusicae) | 2 |
| Swedish Albums (Sverigetopplistan) | 7 |
| Swiss Albums (Schweizer Hitparade) | 6 |
| Swiss Albums (Schweizer Hitparade Romandy) | 7 |
| UK Albums (Official Charts) | 2 |
| US Billboard 200 | 3 |

=== Year-end charts ===
2018 year-end chart performance for Dancing Queen
| Chart (2018) | Position |
|---|---|
| Hungary Albums (MAHASZ) | 61 |
| UK Albums (OCC) | 91 |
| US Billboard 200 | 193 |

2019 year-end chart performance for Dancing Queen
| Chart (2019) | Position |
|---|---|
| US Billboard Top Album Sales | 70 |
| US Billboard Top Current Album Sales | 60 |

== Certifications and sales ==
Certifications and sales for Dancing Queen
| Region | Certification | Certified units/sales |
|---|---|---|
| Canada (Music Canada) | Gold | 40,000^{‡} |
| United Kingdom (BPI) | Silver | 60,000^{‡} |
| United States | — | 150,000 |
^{‡} Sales+streaming figures based on certification alone.
