= Back on My Feet Again (The Babys song) =

1980 single by The Babys

- US single picture sleeve

Single by The Babys

from the album Union Jacks
- B-side: "Turn Around in Tokyo"
- Released: January 1980
- Recorded: 1979
- Genre: Power pop
- Length: 3:18
- Label: Chrysalis Records
- Songwriters: John Waite; Dominic Bugatti; Frank Musker
- Producer: Keith Olsen

The Babys singles chronology
"True Love True Confessions" (1979)	"Back on My Feet Again" (1980)	"Midnight Rendezvous" (1980)

"Back on My Feet Again" is a song by The Babys. It was released in 1979 as a single from their album Union Jacks.

The song is the band's final Top 40 hit, peaking at No. 33 on the Billboard Hot 100.

The song was originally written for The Sweet, who made a demo recording of it in 1979, under the name "Yesterday's Hero" and with other lyrics. However, it was never released because the band's bass player, Steve Priest, hated it. The Sweet's version is on the album Platinum Rare from 2021.

== Chart performance ==
Chart (1980)	Peak position
Australia (KMR)	92
Canada RPM Top Singles	29
US Billboard Hot 100	33
US Cash Box Top 100	29
