= Gypsys, Tramps & Thieves =

1971 single by Cher

- Picture sleeve for some 7-inch vinyl releases, including Germany, Italy and Japan.

Single by Cher

from the album Chér
- B-side: "He'll Never Know"; "The Way of Love"
- Released: September 1, 1971
- Recorded: 1971
- Studio: Larrabee Sound (Los Angeles)
- Genre: Pop; folk rock
- Length: 2:36
- Label: Kapp; MCA
- Songwriter: Bob Stone
- Producer: Snuff Garrett

Cher singles chronology
"For What It's Worth" (1969)	"Gypsys, Tramps & Thieves" (1971)	"The Way of Love" (1972)

"Gypsys, Tramps & Thieves" is a song recorded by American singer and actress Cher from her 1971 seventh studio album Chér (eventually reissued under the title Gypsys, Tramps & Thieves). Kapp Records, a division of MCA Records, released it as the album's lead single on September 1, 1971. The song was written by Bob Stone, and produced by Snuff Garrett. Since Sonny Bono's first attempts at reviving Cher's recording career had been unsuccessful, the record company recruited Garrett as her producer and he chose Stone to write a song specifically for Cher, in order to cater to an adult audience.

"Gypsys, Tramps & Thieves" is an upbeat pop and folk rock story-song that features instrumentation from a carnival calliope and a piano with strings in the background. Cher sings from the point of view of a 16-year-old Romani girl, who was "born in the wagon of a traveling show" and describes her life. It contains themes of teenage pregnancy and implications of prostitution. The song received positive reviews by music critics, and earned Cher a Grammy Award nomination for Best Female Pop Vocal Performance.

Commercially, it became Cher's first solo number-one single on the record charts in Canada and the United States, the first single by a solo artist to rank number one on the Billboard Hot 100 at the same time as on the Canadian Singles Chart. It also reached the top five in Australia, Ireland, Malaysia, New Zealand, Singapore and the United Kingdom. It was certified gold by the Recording Industry Association of America for shipment of one million copies across the United States. At the time of its release, "Gypsys, Tramps & Thieves" was the biggest-selling single in the history of MCA.

"Gypsys, Tramps & Thieves" was performed on several episodes of The Sonny & Cher Comedy Hour (1971-74) and Cher (1975-76) and also on six of Cher's world tours. The song has been recorded by a number of artists, including Vikki Carr, Vicki Lawrence and Nirvana and has appeared in or been referenced in some TV shows such as The Simpsons, The X-Files, Charmed, The Umbrella Academy and Clarkson's Farm. Along with the parent album, "Gypsys, Tramps & Thieves" was considered a turning point in Cher's career, with critics starting to acknowledge her as an artist and crediting the song for restoring her popularity, which had diminished at the end of the previous decade.

== Song information ==
"Gypsys, Tramps & Thieves" was the first single from Chér with instrumental backing by L.A. session musicians from the Wrecking Crew. Record World considered the song a "lively number", while Billboard described it as "an offbeat rock ballad with a lyric to match". The album was subsequently renamed and re-released as Gypsys, Tramps & Thieves after the success of the single.

Released four years after her last top ten hit "You Better Sit Down Kids", this song was a comeback single for Cher — it was her first single in four years to chart higher than number 84 — not only returning her to the top 10 of the charts but also giving her two weeks at number one on the Billboard Hot 100 in November 1971. It knocked off "Maggie May" by Rod Stewart which had spent the previous five weeks at the top. The single also reached number one in Canada and four in the United Kingdom. It was the first single by a solo artist to rank number one on the US Billboard Hot 100 chart at the same time as on the Canadian Singles Chart. As of November 2011, Billboard reported that "Gypsys, Tramps & Thieves" has sold 212,000 digital copies in the US.

=== Story ===
The song describes the life of a 16-year old girl, the song's narrator, who was "born in the wagon of a traveling show" with her "mama", an exotic dancer, and "papa", a patent medicine salesman posing as a preacher. Though the family endures hearing jeers of "gypsies, tramps and thieves" from the people of the town, the narrator would add that, "every night all the men would come around and lay their money down". One day, the family takes in a 21-year-old man who travels with them from "just south of Mobile" to Memphis. One night during the trip, the man and the narrator secretly have sex (the narrator mentioning that if "papa" found out what the young man had done he would have shot him), and three months after the man leaves the caravan, the narrator is "in trouble". After the narrator's daughter is born, she herself subsequently takes up the storytelling for the next generation (referring to "her mama" and "Grampa"), with the family continuing to support themselves through dancing, selling nostrums and preaching.

The title of this song has also been shown with the alternative, albeit correct spelling of the word "Gypsies". The song was described by Rob Tennanbaum in Billboard magazine as one of the greatest songs of the 20th century.

== Live performances ==
Cher performed the song on the following concert tours:

- Do You Believe? tour (performed as part of the Hits Medley)
- Living Proof: The Farewell Tour (performed as part of the Hits Medley)
- Cher at the Colosseum
- Dressed to Kill Tour
- Classic Cher
- Here We Go Again Tour (only during the Oceanian leg of the tour)

== Music video ==
"Gypsys, Tramps & Thieves"

The video for "Gypsys, Tramps & Thieves" was Cher's first music video. The video was a recorded performance of the song on The Sonny & Cher Comedy Hour in 1971. Throughout the video Cher is singing in front of a house wagon and in front of a fire. A second video was made, but it was very similar to the original. In the second video, clips of dancing female gypsies were shown. A promotional video aired on BBC's Top of the Pops in 1971, which features a group of Roma travelling through the countryside. The video follows certain lyrics from the song, ie; "dance for the money they'd throw".

=== Remix version ===
In 2002, a special remix medley was created by Dan-O-Rama for a video montage that was used in Cher's Living Proof: The Farewell Tour. The medley contains the videos of "All I Really Want to Do", "Gypsys, Tramps & Thieves", "Half-Breed", and "Dark Lady".

== Charts ==
=== Weekly charts ===
1971–1972 weekly chart performance for "Gypsys, Tramps & Thieves"
Chart (1971–1972)	Peak position
Australian (Go-Set) Singles Chart	4
Belgian Singles Chart	27
Canadian RPM Top Singles	1
Danish Singles Chart	8
Dutch Mega Top 50 Singles Chart	23
German Singles Chart	25
Irish Singles Chart	3
Israel (IBA)	17
Japanese Singles Chart	17
Malaysian Singles Chart	2
Netherlands (Dutch Top 40)	25
Netherlands (Single Top 100)	23
New Zealand Singles Chart	2
New Zealand (Listener)	2
Quebec (ADISQ)	7
Singapore Singles Chart	2
UK Singles Chart	4
US Billboard Hot 100	1
US Easy Listening (Billboard)	6
US Cash Box Top 100	1

=== Year-end charts ===
1971 year-end chart performance for "Gypsys, Tramps & Thieves"
Chart (1971)	Position
Australian Singles Chart	67
Canadian RPM Top Singles	4
UK Singles (Official Charts Company)	52
US Billboard Hot 100	39
US Billboard Top Easy Listening Singles	46

1972 year-end chart performance for "Gypsys, Tramps & Thieves"
Chart (1972)	Position
Australian Singles Chart	58

== Certifications and sales ==
Certifications and sales for "Gypsys, Tramps & Thieves"
Region	Certification	Certified units/sales
New Zealand (RMNZ)	Gold	15,000^{‡}
United Kingdom (BPI)	Silver	200,000^{‡}
United States (RIAA)	Gold	1,000,000^{^}
^{^} Shipments figures based on certification alone.^{‡} Sales+streaming figures based on certification alone.

== In popular culture ==
The song makes an appearance in The Simpsons episode "One Fish, Two Fish, Blowfish, Blue Fish" where it is sung by an anesthesiologist named Richie Sakai, a character of one of the shows producers Richard Sakai.

In the Werewolf episode of Mystery Science Theater 3000, while singing snippets of different songs to the end credits theme of Werewolf, Mike Nelson sings a brief part of the song.

It was also used in season 4 of the Netflix series The Umbrella Academy, in the post credit scene of the 8th episode of the 3rd season of Amazon Prime's Clarkson's Farm, as well as in a scene of the season 1 finale of HBO's Six Feet Under.

It also appears in the USA Special of BBCs Top Gear
