= Chér (1971 album) =

Studio album by Cher
- Released: September 1971
- Recorded: 1971
- Genres: Pop; rock
- Length: 27:57 (US edition); 33:33 (UK edition)
- Labels: Kapp; MCA
- Producer: Snuff Garrett

Cher chronology
| Chastity (1969) | Chér (1971) | Superpack (1971) |

Singles from Chér
- 1. "Gypsys, Tramps & Thieves" Released: September 1971; 2. "The Way of Love" Released: January 1972

Chér (eventually reissued under the title Gypsys, Tramps & Thieves) is the self-titled seventh studio album by American singer-actress Cher, released in September 1971 by Kapp Records. For this album, Cher worked with Snuff Garrett as producer, instead of her usual producer, her husband, Sonny Bono. Al Capps did the arrangements. The album was retitled after the success of the single of the same name. It received positive reviews from critics, and the RIAA certified it Gold on July 2, 1972. The album was her first and most successful album of the '70s. Two singles were released from the album, "The Way of Love" and "Gypsies, Tramps & Thieves", both reaching the top 10 on the Billboard Hot 100 chart.

== Background and production ==
After the failures of the previous albums, Cher signed a contract with Kapp-MCA Records in 1971. Kapp and MCA were the labels with which Cher had more success in the seventies and she remained with them until 1974. Johnny Musso of Kapp Records thought that Garrett and Cher would work well together and decided to team them up. This time Garrett was introduced to redesign the Cher sound for her first comeback.

The album was initially released under the name of Chér in September, and later re-released and retitled as Gypsys, Tramps & Thieves due to the success of the first single. Its success followed the debut of The Sonny & Cher Comedy Hour, which premiered on CBS in August 1971 as a summer series. This was also due to Cher's new image, as she dropped her hippie attire and began being dressed by fashion designer Bob Mackie, who emphasized her exotic looks and made her one of the most fashionable and glamorous women of the '70s.

== Composition and recording ==
The opening track of the album is "The Way of Love", a cover song originally by Kathy Kirby. Other covers are "Fire and Rain" and "He Ain't Heavy, He's My Brother". The rest of the album includes narrative ballads.

During the recording session, three other songs were recorded, "Classified 1-A", "Don't Put It On Me" and "Gentle Foe". The first two were added in the UK version of the album, and later released as a single in the US. "Don't Put It On Me" was added as a bonus track on the official 8-track tape of this album that closed program four. In 2000, "Classified 1-A" appeared as a bonus track on the album not.com.mercial. "Gentle Foe" was released in 1971 as a soundtrack for the documentary Once Upon a Wheel.

== Release ==
The album was originally released in 1971. In 1992 it was released on CD for the first time. In August 1999, the US version of the album was re-issued on Universal Records and in the UK in 1993 the original album and Cher's next studio album Foxy Lady were re-issued together on one CD called Cher/Foxy Lady, which features all of the tracks from both albums.

"Gypsys, Tramps & Thieves", the album's first single release, reached #1 on the Billboard Hot 100 and #4 on the UK Singles Chart. "Gypsys, Tramps & Thieves" was her first number one in the US as a solo artist on the Billboard Hot 100 chart; it also reached #1 in Canada and Japan. It peaked at #6 on the US Adult Contemporary chart as well. The song was performed live on The Sonny & Cher Comedy Hour, featuring Cher dressed as a gypsy wearing a huge wig singing in front of a wagon. The second and last single was the opening track "The Way of Love". It peaked at #7 in the US, #2 on the Adult Contemporary chart and #5 in Canada. Both tracks were performed on numerous Cher tours.

== Critical reception ==
Professional ratings
Review scores
| Source | Rating |
|---|---|
| AllMusic | 4.5/5 stars |
| The Rolling Stone Album Guide | 2/5 stars |

Chér received mostly positive reviews from music critics. Cash Box praised the album, stating that Cher "is absolutely smashing", and that "everything about the album (...) is first class", concluding that it is "this artist's best and most commercial disk". Billboard also praised the album, particularly, Cher's voice, which was described as "one of the distinctive voices in popular music", and the "lush orchestral frameworks within which to tell her story". Record World wrote that Cher's television exposure "may remind buyers that the gal has quite a set of pipes", adding that "not all the ballads are up to her level, but most are".

AllMusic considered the album "a good album with some great moments", highlighting "The Way of Love" as "a career highlight", while noting that although the opening tracks deliver "a one-two punch", the quality "is impossible to sustain throughout the entire album", with some material described as "passable middle-of-the-road pop". Yahoo! Music noted that "powerhouse arrangements and production from Snuff Garrett and straight-faced vocals from Cher make for an eventful listen", highlighting interpretations of contemporary hits such as "He Ain't Heavy, He's My Brother" and "Fire and Rain". Rhapsody noted that the singer "was already a star" prior to the album's release, but that Chér "launched" her "mega-selling Vegas torch singer persona", adding that tracks such as the "sexually ambiguous" "The Way of Love" and the "racy" "Gypsys, Tramps & Thieves" the highlights.

== Commercial performance ==
Chér debuted on the Billboard 200 at number 194 in late September 1971, eventually peaking at 16. During 1972 sales reached 500,000 copies in North America, and it was certified gold by the RIAA. The album became one of Cher's biggest hits at the time and the lead single was nominated for a Grammy Award for "Best Pop Female Vocalist".

The album also charted in the Canadian album chart and reached number 14. In Europe it charted only in the Norway album chart, failing to enter the UK Albums Chart. It also peaked on the Australian albums chart at number 43.

== Track listing ==
Side one
| No. | Title | Writer(s) | Length |
|---|---|---|---|
| 1. | "The Way of Love" | Al Stillman; Jacques Diéval | 2:32 |
| 2. | "Gypsys, Tramps & Thieves" | Bob Stone | 2:38 |
| 3. | "He'll Never Know" | Harry Lloyd; Gloria Sklerov | 3:27 |
| 4. | "Fire and Rain" | James Taylor | 3:01 |
| 5. | "When You Find Out Where You're Goin' Let Me Know" | Linda Laurie | 2:17 |
| 6. | "Classified 1A" (UK bonus track) | Sonny Bono | 2:58 |

Side two
| No. | Title | Writer(s) | Length |
|---|---|---|---|
| 1. | "He Ain't Heavy, He's My Brother" | Bob Russell; Bobby Scott | 3:31 |
| 2. | "I Hate to Sleep Alone" | Peggy Clinger | 2:28 |
| 3. | "I'm in the Middle" | Billy Gayles | 2:45 |
| 4. | "Touch and Go" | Jerry Fuller | 2:00 |
| 5. | "One Honest Man" | Ginger Greco | 2:25 |
| 6. | "Don't Put It on Me" (UK bonus track) | Sonny Bono | 2:38 |

== Personnel ==
- Cher – lead vocals
- Snuff Garrett – record producer
- Al Capps – arrangement assistance
- Lenny Roberts – sound engineer
- Richard Avedon – photography

== Charts ==
=== Weekly charts ===
Weekly chart performance for Chér
| Chart (1971–72) | Peak position |
|---|---|
| Australian Albums (Kent Music Report) | 43 |
| Canada Top Albums/CDs (RPM) | 14 |
| Norway Albums (VG-lista) | 21 |
| US Billboard 200 | 16 |
| US Cash Box Top 100 Albums | 16 |
| US Record World Top 100 LP's | 15 |

=== Year-end charts ===
Year-end chart performance for Chér
| Chart (1972) | Position |
|---|---|
| US Billboard 200 | 48 |
| US Cash Box Top 100 Albums | 91 |

== Certifications and sales ==
Certifications for Chér
| Region | Certification | Certified units/sales |
|---|---|---|
| United States (RIAA) | Gold | 500,000^{^} |
^{^} Shipments figures based on certification alone.
