= Cher singles discography =

Singles recorded by American singer

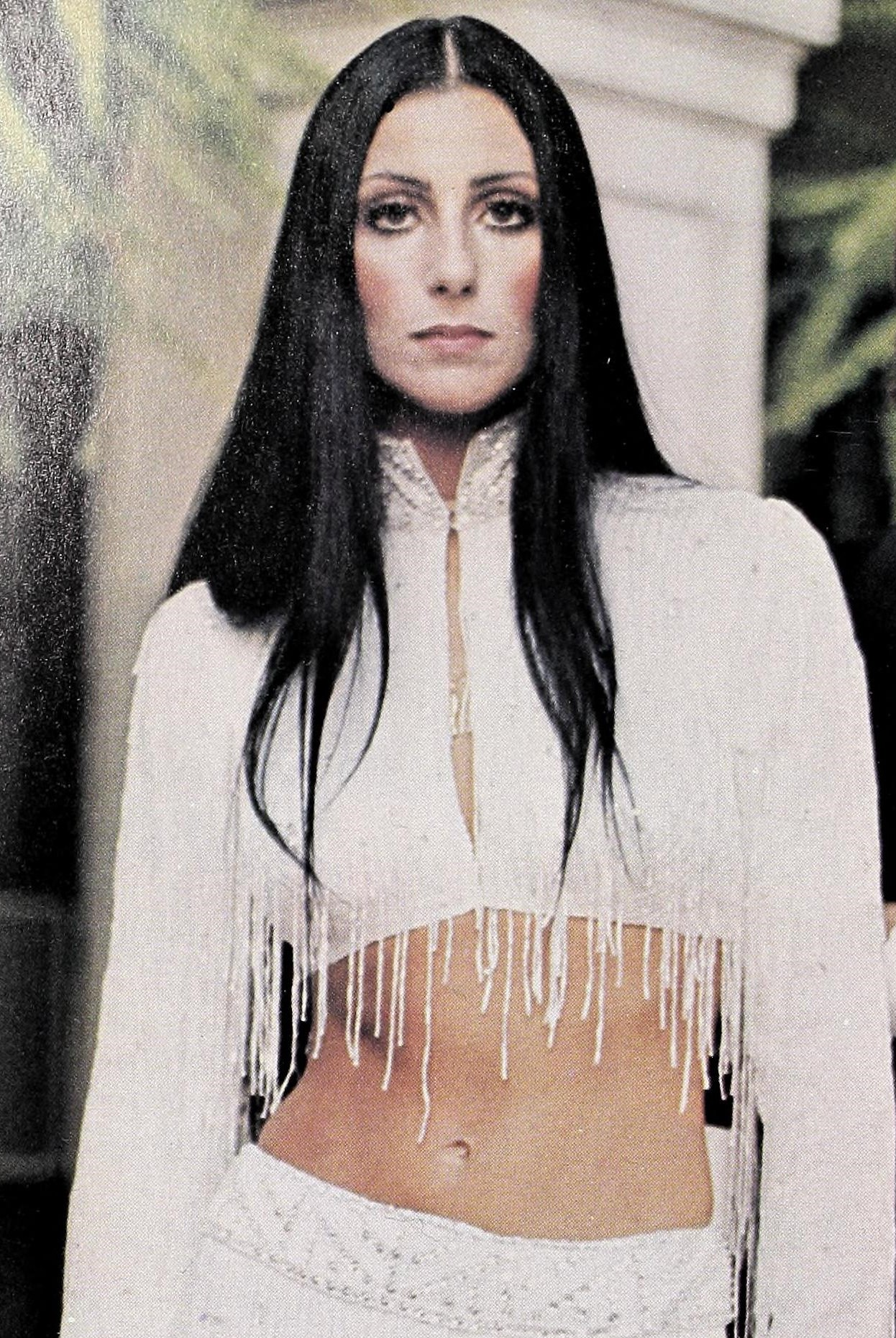
- 1972 publicity photo of Cher
- Singles: 80
- Promotional singles: 28
- Other appearances: 36

American entertainer Cher has released 80 official singles, 28 promotional singles and appeared in 36 guest appearances on other artists's songs. On the US Billboard Hot 100, she has achieved five number-one singles, 17 top-ten singles, 32 top-40 singles and a total of 52 charting singles. (Note: Not counting songs from Sonny & Cher's catalog, Cher has achieved four number-one singles, 12 top-ten singles, 22 top-40 singles and 34 charting singles on the US Billboard Hot 100. Billboard's current rules credit a song to a solo artist if their name appears in the official billing.)

In 1998, Billboard ranked Cher the 5th female artist with the most Hot 100 entries. She has reached the Hot 100's Top 10 at least once during each of four decades—the 1960s, 1970s, 1980s and 1990s—placing her in a tie for second place in that category as of May 2014, alongside Aerosmith, Barbra Streisand, Madonna and Whitney Houston, only behind Michael Jackson. Cher's span of solo top-ten singles on the Hot 100 spans 33 years, one month and three weeks (not counting the Sonny and Cher hits "I Got You Babe" and "Baby Don't Go"), from "Bang Bang (My Baby Shot Me Down)" in 1966 to "Believe" in 1999, placing her in third place in that category as of May 2014, behind Jackson and Carlos Santana.

Cher's career as a recording artist spans seven decades and she is the only artist to have a number-one single on a Billboard chart in each of the past seven decades. This feat was accomplished when Cher released "DJ Play a Christmas Song", the lead single from her studio album Christmas, on October 6, 2023. It reached the number-one spot on the Billboard Dance/Electronic Digital Song Sales chart. It peaked at number 90 on the Billboard Hot 100 chart, making it her first appearance on the chart since 2002. On the UK singles chart, she is the only solo artist to have a top-40 hit in seven consecutive decades, as well as being the oldest female singer to have a top-40 hit. She has had a total of 34 top-40 hits, beginning with "All I Really Want to Do" in 1965 through "DJ Play a Christmas Song" in 2023.

== Singles ==
=== 1960s ===
List of singles, with selected chart positions, showing year released and album name
| Year | Single | Peak chart positions | | | | | | | | | | | Album |
| Year | Single | US | AUS | AUT | CAN | CAN QC | GER | IRE | NOR | NLD | SWE | UK | Album |
|---|---|---|---|---|---|---|---|---|---|---|---|---|---|
| 1965 | "All I Really Want to Do" | 15 | 68 | — | 11 | 9 | — | — | 8 | 15 | 13 | 9 | All I Really Want to Do |
| 1965 | "Where Do You Go" | 25 | 95 | — | 5 | 19 | — | — | — | — | — | — | The Sonny Side of Chér |
| 1966 | "Bang Bang (My Baby Shot Me Down)" | 2 | 11 | 6 | 4 | 4 | 17 | 3 | 4 | 16 | — | 3 | The Sonny Side of Chér |
| 1966 | "Alfie" | 32 | 96 | — | 36 | 16 | — | — | — | — | — | — | Chér |
| 1966 | "I Feel Something in the Air" | — | — | — | 89 | — | — | — | — | — | — | 43 | Chér |
| 1966 | "Sunny" | — | — | — | — | — | — | — | 1 | 1 | 3 | 32 | Chér |
| 1966 | "Behind the Door" | 97 | — | — | 74 | — | — | — | — | — | — | — | With Love, Chér |
| 1966 | "Mama (When My Dollies Have Babies)" | — (Note: "Mama (When My Dollies Have Babies)" did not enter the Billboard Hot 100 but peaked on the Bubbling Under Hot 100 Singles chart at number 24.) | — | — | 45 | — | — | — | — | — | — | — | With Love, Chér |
| 1967 | "Hey Joe" | 94 | — | — | — | — | — | — | — | — | — | — | With Love, Chér |
| 1967 | "You Better Sit Down Kids" | 9 | 100 | — | 12 | 5 | — | — | — | — | — | — | With Love, Chér |
| 1968 | "The Click Song Number One" | — | — | — | 56 | — | — | — | — | — | — | — | Backstage |
| 1969 | "For What It's Worth" | — (Note: "For What It's Worth" did not enter the Billboard Hot 100 but peaked on the Bubbling Under Hot 100 Singles chart at number 25.) | — | — | 88 | 30 | — | — | — | — | — | — | 3614 Jackson Highway |
| 1969 | "I Walk on Guilded Splinters" | — | — | — | — | — | — | — | — | — | — | — | 3614 Jackson Highway |
| 1969 | "Chastity's Song (Band of Thieves)" | — | — | — | — | — | — | — | — | — | — | — | Chastity |
"—" denotes releases that did not chart or was not released.

=== 1970s ===
List of singles, with selected chart positions and certifications, showing year released and album name
| Year | Single | Peak chart positions | | | | | | | | | | | Certifications | Album |
| Year | Single | US | US AC | US Dan. | AUS | CAN | CAN QC | GER | IRE | NLD | SWE | UK | Certifications | Album |
|---|---|---|---|---|---|---|---|---|---|---|---|---|---|---|
| 1971 | "Gypsys, Tramps & Thieves" | 1 | 6 | — | 5 | 1 | 7 | 25 | 3 | 23 | — | 4 | RIAA: Gold; BPI: Silver; RMNZ: Gold | Gypsys, Tramps & Thieves |
| 1972 | "The Way of Love" | 7 | 2 | — | 42 | 6 | 44 | — | — | — | — | — | | Gypsys, Tramps & Thieves |
| 1972 | "Living in a House Divided" | 22 | 2 | — | 61 | 17 | 42 | — | — | — | — | — | | Foxy Lady |
| 1972 | "Don't Hide Your Love" | 46 | 19 | — | — | 44 | — | — | — | — | — | — | | Foxy Lady |
| 1973 | "Am I Blue?" | — (Note: "Am I Blue?" did not enter the Billboard Hot 100 but peaked on the Bubbling Under Hot 100 Singles chart at number 11.) | — | — | — | — | — | — | — | — | — | — | | Bittersweet White Light |
| 1973 | "Half-Breed" | 1 | 3 | — | 4 | 1 | 4 | 29 | — | — | 6 | — | RIAA: Gold | Half-Breed |
| 1973 | "Dark Lady" | 1 | 3 | — | 17 | 2 | 4 | — | — | 15 | 4 | 36 | RIAA: Gold | Dark Lady |
| 1974 | "Train of Thought" | 27 | 9 | — | 84 | 18 | 15 | — | — | — | — | — | | Dark Lady |
| 1974 | "I Saw a Man and He Danced with His Wife" | 42 | 3 | — | — | 31 | — | — | — | — | — | — | | Dark Lady |
| 1975 | "Geronimo's Cadillac" | — | — | — | — | — | — | — | — | — | — | — | | Stars |
| 1976 | "Long Distance Love Affair" | — | — | — | — | — | — | — | — | — | — | — | | I'd Rather Believe in You |
| 1977 | "Pirate" | 93 | — | — | — | — | — | — | — | — | — | — | | Cherished |
| 1979 | "Take Me Home" | 8 | 19 | 2 | — | 10 | — | — | — | — | — | — | RIAA: Gold | Take Me Home |
| 1979 | "Wasn't It Good" | 49 | — | — | — | 65 | — | — | — | — | — | — | | Take Me Home |
| 1979 | "It's Too Late to Love Me Now" | — | — | — | — | — | — | — | — | — | — | — | | Take Me Home |
| 1979 | "Hell on Wheels" | 59 | — | — | — | — | — | — | — | — | — | — | | Prisoner |
"—" denotes releases that did not chart or was not released.

=== 1980s ===
List of singles, with selected chart positions and certifications, showing year released and album name
| Year | Single | Peak chart positions | | | | | | | | | | | Certifications | Album |
| Year | Single | US | US AC | AUS | AUT | CAN | GER | IRE | NLD | NZ | SWE | UK | Certifications | Album |
|---|---|---|---|---|---|---|---|---|---|---|---|---|---|---|
| 1981 | "Dead Ringer for Love" (with Meat Loaf) | — | — | 65 | — | — | — | 2 | 32 | — | 16 | 5 | BPI: Gold | Dead Ringer |
| 1982 | "I Paralyze" | — | — | — | — | — | — | — | — | — | — | — | | I Paralyze |
| 1987 | "I Found Someone" | 10 | 33 | 8 | — | 14 | — | 4 | 94 | — | — | 5 | | Cher |
| 1988 | "We All Sleep Alone" | 14 | 11 | 76 | — | 27 | — | — | — | — | — | 47 | | Cher |
| 1988 | "Skin Deep" | 79 | — | 113 | — | — | — | — | — | — | — | — | | Cher |
| 1989 | "After All" (with Peter Cetera) | 6 | 1 | 50 | — | 5 | — | 24 | — | — | — | 84 | RIAA: Gold | Heart of Stone |
| 1989 | "If I Could Turn Back Time" | 3 | 1 | 1 | 14 | 2 | 16 | 6 | 4 | 3 | 11 | 6 | RIAA: Gold; ARIA: 2× Platinum; IFPI DEN: Platinum; RMNZ: 2× Platinum; BPI: Platinum | Heart of Stone |
| 1989 | "Just Like Jesse James" | 8 | 9 | 14 | — | 8 | 38 | 10 | — | 16 | — | 11 | ARIA: Gold; RMNZ: Gold; BPI: Silver | Heart of Stone |
"—" denotes releases that did not chart or was not released.

=== 1990s ===
List of singles, with selected chart positions and certifications, showing year released and album name
| Year | Single | Peak chart positions | | | | | | | | | | | Certifications | Album |
| Year | Single | US | US AC | US Dan. | AUS | AUT | CAN | GER | IRE | NLD | SWI | UK | Certifications | Album |
|---|---|---|---|---|---|---|---|---|---|---|---|---|---|---|
| 1990 | "Heart of Stone" | 20 | 30 | — | 70 | — | 26 | — | 24 | — | — | 43 | | Heart of Stone |
| 1990 | "You Wouldn't Know Love" | — | — | — | 153 | — | — | — | 29 | — | 33 | 55 | | Heart of Stone |
| 1990 | "Baby I'm Yours" | — | — | — | 146 | — | — | — | — | — | — | 89 | | Mermaids: Music from the Original Motion Picture Soundtrack |
| 1990 | "The Shoop Shoop Song (It's in His Kiss)" | 33 | 7 | — | 4 | 1 | 21 | 3 | 1 | 5 | 4 | 1 | ARIA: Platinum; BPI: Gold; BVMI: Gold; IFPI AUT: Gold; IFPI DEN: Gold; RMNZ: Gold; SNEP: Silver | Mermaids: Music from the Original Motion Picture Soundtrack |
| 1991 | "Love and Understanding" | 17 | 3 | — | 23 | 6 | 11 | 20 | 7 | 9 | — | 10 | | Love Hurts |
| 1991 | "Save Up All Your Tears" | 37 | 16 | — | 114 | 18 | 32 | 56 | 30 | — | — | 37 | | Love Hurts |
| 1991 | "Love Hurts" | — | — | — | — | — | — | — | — | — | — | 43 | | Love Hurts |
| 1992 | "Could've Been You" | — | — | — | — | — | — | 75 | — | — | — | 31 | | Love Hurts |
| 1992 | "When Lovers Become Strangers" | — | 15 | — | — | — | 37 | — | — | — | — | — | | Love Hurts |
| 1992 | "Oh No Not My Baby" | — | — | — | 188 | 30 | — | 52 | — | — | 19 | 33 | | Greatest Hits: 1965–1992 |
| 1993 | "Many Rivers to Cross" | — | — | — | — | — | — | — | — | — | — | 37 | | Greatest Hits: 1965–1992 |
| 1993 | "Whenever You're Near" | — | — | — | — | — | — | — | — | — | — | 72 | | Greatest Hits: 1965–1992 |
| 1993 | "I Got You Babe" (with Beavis and Butt-Head) | — (Note: "I Got You Babe" duet with Beavis and Butt-head did not enter the Billboard Hot 100 but peaked on the Bubbling Under Hot 100 Singles chart at number eight.) | — | — | 69 | — | — | — | — | 9 | — | 35 | | The Beavis and Butt-head Experience |
| 1995 | "Love Can Build a Bridge" (with Chrissie Hynde, Neneh Cherry and Eric Clapton) | — | — | — | — | 18 | — | 62 | 5 | 41 | 21 | 1 | BPI: Silver | Non-album single |
| 1995 | "Walking in Memphis" | — | — | — | 65 | 17 | 60 | 63 | — | 44 | — | 11 | BPI: Silver | It's a Man's World |
| 1996 | "One by One" | 52 | 9 | 7 | 170 | — | 22 | — | — | — | — | 7 | | It's a Man's World |
| 1996 | "Not Enough Love in the World" | — | — | — | — | — | — | — | — | — | — | 31 | | It's a Man's World |
| 1996 | "The Sun Ain't Gonna Shine Anymore" | — | — | — | — | — | — | — | — | — | — | 26 | | It's a Man's World |
| 1996 | "Paradise Is Here" | — | — | 11 | — | — | — | — | — | — | — | — | | It's a Man's World |
| 1998 | "Believe" | 1 | 3 | 1 | 1 | 1 | 1 | 1 | 1 | 1 | 1 | 1 | RIAA: Platinum; ARIA: 3× Platinum; BPI: 5× Platinum; BRMA: 3× Platinum; BVMI: 5× Gold; IFPI AUT: Platinum; IFPI DEN: Platinum; IFPI SWI: Platinum; NVPI: Platinum; RMNZ: 2× Platinum; SNEP: Diamond | Believe |
| 1999 | "Strong Enough" | 57 | 29 | 1 | 11 | 4 | 16 | 3 | 11 | 11 | 5 | 5 | ARIA: Gold; BPI: Platinum; BRMA: Platinum; BVMI: Gold; SNEP: Gold | Believe |
| 1999 | "All or Nothing" | — | — | 1 | 62 | 38 | — | 44 | 26 | 61 | 30 | 12 | | Believe |
| 1999 | "Dov'è l'amore" | — | — | 5 | 49 | 38 | — | 31 | — | 53 | 18 | 21 | | Believe |
"—" denotes releases that did not chart or was not released.

=== 2000s–2020s ===
List of singles, with selected chart positions and certifications, showing year released and album name
| Year | Single | Peak chart positions | | | | | | | | | | | Certifications | Album |
| Year | Single | US | US AC | US Dan. | AUS | AUT | CAN | GER | IRE | SCO | SWI | UK | Certifications | Album |
|---|---|---|---|---|---|---|---|---|---|---|---|---|---|---|
| 2001 | "Più Che Puoi" (with Eros Ramazzotti) | — | — | — | — | — | — | 61 | — | — | 17 | — | | Stilelibero |
| 2001 | "The Music's No Good Without You" | — | — | 19 | 23 | 24 | 5 | 27 | 25 | 8 | 22 | 8 | | Living Proof |
| 2002 | "Song for the Lonely" | 85 | 11 | 1 | — | — | 18 | — | — | — | — | — (Note: "Song for the Lonely" did not enter the UK Singles Chart Top 100, but peaked at number 24 on the UK Club Chart (Music Week)) | | Living Proof |
| 2002 | "Alive Again" | — | — | — | — | — | — | 27 | — | — | 80 | — | | Living Proof |
| 2002 | "A Different Kind of Love Song" | — | 30 | 1 | — | — | — | — | — | — | — | — | | Living Proof |
| 2003 | "When the Money's Gone" / "Love One Another" | — | — | 1 | — | — | — | — | — | — | — | — | | Living Proof |
| 2003 | "Bewitched, Bothered and Bewildered" (with Rod Stewart) | — | 17 | — | — | — | — | — | — | — | — | — | | As Time Goes By: The Great American Songbook, Volume II |
| 2010 | "You Haven't Seen the Last of Me" | — | — | 1 | 91 | — | — | — | — | — | — | — | | Burlesque: Original Motion Picture Soundtrack |
| 2013 | "Woman's World" | — (Note: "Woman's World" did not enter the Billboard Hot 100 but peaked on the Bubbling Under Hot 100 Singles chart at number 25.) | 28 | 1 | 77 | 60 | — | 66 | — | 93 | 26 | — | | Closer to the Truth |
| 2013 | "I Hope You Find It" | — | 17 | — | — | 43 | — | 49 | 39 | 22 | 26 | 25 | | Closer to the Truth |
| 2013 | "Take It Like a Man" | — | — | 2 | — | — | — | — | — | — | — | — (Note: "Take It Like a Man" did not enter the main UK Singles Chart, but peaked at number 48 on the UK's Physical Singles Chart.) | | Closer to the Truth |
| 2014 | "I Walk Alone" | — | — | 2 | — | — | — | — | — | — | — | — | | Closer to the Truth |
| 2018 | "Fernando" (with Andy García) | — | 22 | — | — | — | — | — | — | 24 | — | 92 | BPI: Silver | Mamma Mia! Here We Go Again: The Movie Soundtrack |
| 2018 | "Gimme! Gimme! Gimme! (A Man After Midnight)" | — | — | 4 | — (Note: "Gimme! Gimme! Gimme! (A Man After Midnight)" did not enter the ARIA Singles Chart, but peaked at number 40 on the ARIA Digital Track Chart.) | — | — | — | — | 26 | — | — (Note: "Gimme! Gimme! Gimme! (A Man After Midnight)" did not enter the main UK Singles Chart, but peaked at number 34 on the UK Singles Sales Chart.) | | Dancing Queen |
| 2018 | "SOS" | — | — | — | — | — | — | — | — | 56 | — | — (Note: "SOS" did not enter the main UK Singles Chart, but peaked at number 78 on the UK Singles Sales Chart.) | | Dancing Queen |
| 2020 | "Chiquitita (Spanish Version)" | — (Note: "Chiquitita (Spanish Version)" did not enter the main US Singles Chart, but peaked at number 6 on the Latin Digital Songs Chart.) | — | — | — | — | — | — | — | — | — | — | | Non-album singles |
| 2020 | "Stop Crying Your Heart Out" (with BBC Radio 2 Allstars) | — | — | — | — | — | — | — | — | — | — | 7 | | Non-album singles |
| 2023 | "DJ Play a Christmas Song" | 90 | 1 | — | 45 | 58 | 53 | 62 | 12 | — | 61 | 18 | BPI: Silver | Christmas |
| 2025 | "Christmas Is Here" | — | — | — | — | — | — | — | — | — | — | — (Note: "Christmas Is Here" did not enter the UK Singles Chart, but peaked at number 68 on the UK Singles Downloads Chart.) | | Christmas (Deluxe) |
"—" denotes releases that did not chart or was not released.

== Other charted songs ==
List of singles, with selected chart positions and certifications, showing year released and album name
| Year | Single | Peak chart positions | | | | | | | | | | | Certifications | Album |
| Year | Single | US AC | US D/E | AUS | CAN | CAN AC | IRE | MEX | NZ Hot | SCO | SWE | UK | Certifications | Album |
|---|---|---|---|---|---|---|---|---|---|---|---|---|---|---|
| 1974 | "Carousel Man" | 41 | — | — | 83 | — | — | — | — | — | — | — | | Half-Breed |
| 1974 | "Rescue Me" | — | — | — | 82 | — | — | — | — | — | — | — | | Dark Lady |
| 1974 | "A Woman's Story" | — | — | — | 88 | — | — | — | — | — | — | — | | Non-album single |
| 1988 | "Main Man" | — | — | 105 | — | — | — | — | — | — | — | — | | Cher |
| 2018 | "Super Trouper" (with Mamma Mia! Here We Go Again cast) | — | — | — | — | — | — | — | — | 52 | — | — (Note: "Super Trouper" did not enter the main UK Singles Chart, but peaked at number 81 on the UK Singles Sales Chart.) | BPI: Silver | Mamma Mia! Here We Go Again: The Movie Soundtrack |
| 2018 | "Dancing Queen" | — | — | — | — | — | — | 4 | — | — | — | — | | Dancing Queen |
| 2023 | "What Christmas Means to Me" (with Stevie Wonder) | — | — | — | — | 4 | 94 | — | 21 | — | 57 | 95 | | Christmas |
| 2023 | "Run Rudolph Run" | — | — | — | — | 21 | — | — | 8 | — | — | — | | Christmas |
| 2023 | "Christmas (Baby Please Come Home)" (with Darlene Love) | — | — | — | — | 25 | — | — | 32 | — | — | — | | Christmas |
| 2024 | "DJ Play a Christmas Song" (with Kelly Clarkson) | — | 33 | — | — | — | — | — | — | — | — | — | | Christmas (Deluxe) |
"—" denotes releases that did not chart or was not released.

== Promotional or limited releases ==
List of promotional singles, showing year released and other relevant details
| Year | Single | Notes |
|---|---|---|
| 1964 | "Ringo, I Love You" | The first song recorded by Cher as a solo artist. It was released as a single (Annette Records 1000) under the pseudonym Bonnie Jo Mason. |
| 1964 | "Dream Baby" | From her 1965 debut studio album All I Really Want to Do. The song was used as a promo single and was released under the name Cherilyn. |
| 1967 | "Ma Piano (Per Non Svegliarmi)" | Non-album Italian-language single. |
| 1967 | "Mama" | Non-album Italian-language single. Italian version of "Mama (When My Dollies Have Babies)". |
| 1968 | "Bambini Miei" | Non-album Italian-language single. Italian version of "You Better Sit Down Kids". Recorded in 1967. |
| 1968 | "Take Me for a Little While" | Served as a promotional single from the 1968 album Backstage. |
| 1968 | "Yours Until Tomorrow" | Non-album single. |
| 1970 | "Superstar" | The final song that Cher recorded under the Atco Records label was the Stan Vincent produced "Superstar". The song appeared on a one-sided white label DJ promotional single. |
| 1970 | "(Just Enough to Keep Me) Hangin' On" | The mono version was released as a one-sided white label DJ promotional single. |
| 1971 | "Don't Put It on Me" | B-side to the 1972 single "The Way of Love". "Don't Put It On Me" was released only for radio station in North America. In UK the song was released on April 7, 1971, also as a 7" promotional single. |
| 1974 | "A Woman's Story" | Released in 1974 by Warner-Spector Records. Remastered and re-released to digital platforms for the first time on August 1, 2024 by Warner Bros. Records. |
| 1975 | "A Love Like Yours (Don't Come Knocking Everyday)" | A duet by Harry Nilsson and Cher from the compilation album All Meat. Released as a single by Warner-Spector Records. |
| 1977 | "War Paint and Soft Feathers" | Promotional release from the 1977 studio album Cherished. |
| 1979 | "Holdin' Out for Love" | From the 1979 studio album Prisoner. "Holdin' Out for Love" was released as a promotional single in North America, UK and Japan. In North America it was released as a DJ promo, in UK "Outrageous" is on its B-side, while "Boys and Girls" was the B-side of the Japanese single. |
| 1980 | "Bad Love" | This track was recorded for the soundtrack of the film Foxes in 1980. The mega-mix of various album tracks including "Bad Love" reached No. 30 on the U.S. Billboard Dance/Club Play Chart the same year. |
| 1982 | "Rudy" | This track was recorded for the I Paralyze album and released as a promo single in 1982. |
| 1988 | "Bang Bang" | The rock version from the Cher album was released as a promo single in 1988 in France. |
| 1999 | "The Star Spangled Banner" | The national anthem of the United States of America was performed during the Super Bowl XXXIII in January 1999. The song was released as a one-track CD promo in North America. |
| 2000 | "If I Could Turn Back Time" (Almighty Definitive Mix) | From the 1989 studio album Heart of Stone. The song was later remixed for the UK 12" Vinyl Promo Almighty v Cher, released by Eternal/WEA. The 12" contains two other mixes of "If I Could Turn Back Time" and mixes of "Believe" and "One by One". |
| 2003 | "Human" | Recorded for the film Stuck on You, in which Cher starred. An official soundtrack was not released, apart from on a German promotional CD called "Unzertrennlich". A promotional single of "Human" was also released to DJs. |
| 2013 | "Sirens" | From the 2013 studio album Closer to the Truth. The song was released in a compilation called "Songs for the Philippines". The promotional single of "Sirens" was released with 2 tracks, Album version and Radio edit. |
| 2017 | "Ooga Boo" | A song featured in an episode of Home: Adventures with Tip & Oh in which Cher plays a rock diva called "Chercophonie". |
| 2018 | "One of Us" | Made available on several streaming platforms as a promotional single only from Dancing Queen. |
| 2020 | "Happiness Is Just a Thing Called Joe" | Cher performed the song at a "I Will Vote" virtual concert in her support of the US president candidate Joe Biden. |
| 2021 | "Walls" | A song Cher recorded for the Free the Wild foundation, later featured in her Cher and the Loneliest Elephant documentary. |
| 2023 | "Walking in Memphis" (Shut Up and Dance Vocal Mix) | Released June 1, 2023 as the first promo single from the deluxe edition of It's A Man's World. |
| 2023 | "One by One" (Junior Vasquez's Pride Mix) | Released June 23, 2023 as the second promo single from the deluxe edition of It's A Man's World. |
| 2023 | "Paradise Is Here" (Sunrise Mix) | Released July 7, 2023 as the third promo single from the deluxe edition of It's A Man's World. |
| 2024 | "Angels in the Snow" (Discotastique! Mix) | Released December 6, 2024 as the first promo single from the deluxe edition of Christmas. |

== Other appearances ==
List of other non-single appearances, B-sides and unreleased songs, showing year released and other relevant details
| Year | Song | Notes |
|---|---|---|
| 1965 | "I'm Gonna Love You" | Appears on the side B of the single "All I Really Want to Do". It was also released on the Good Times soundtrack by Sonny & Cher. |
| 1966 | "She's No Better Than Me" | Appears on the side B of the singles "Sunny" and "Alfie" |
| 1967 | "Nel Mio Cielo Ci Sei Tu" | Italian version of "I Feel Something in the Air". Appears on side B of the single "Ma Piano (Per Non Svegliarmi)" |
| 1971 | "Gentle Foe" | Appears on the Once Upon a Wheel soundtrack, released only as a promotional item on cassette and 8-track cartridge by Coca-Cola and Warner Bros. Records |
| 1971 | "Big Yellow Taxi" | Cher recorded this song for her TV show The Sonny & Cher Comedy Hour, which aired with an animated video by John Wilson. The studio version was never released. |
| 1971 | "One Tin Soldier" | Cher recorded this song for her TV show The Sonny & Cher Comedy Hour, which aired with an animated video by John Wilson. The studio version was never released. |
| 1972 | "Brand New Key" | Cher recorded this song for her TV show The Sonny & Cher Comedy Hour, which aired with an animated video by John Wilson. The studio version was never released. |
| 1974 | "Baby, I Love You" | Appears on the side B of the single "A Woman's Story", released in 1974 by Warner-Spector Records. |
| 1978 | "Living in Sin" | Performed by Gene Simmons on his debut studio album, Gene Simmons. Cher sang only in one verse on backing vocals as the telephone groupie. |
| 1982 | "I'm Just Your Yesterday" (original version) | Original version of the duet between Cher and her mother, Georgia Holt, recorded in 1982, it only appears on the documentary Dear Mom, Love Cher. |
| 1989 | "Some Guys" | Appears as the B-side of the single "If I Could Turn Back Time". |
| 1990 | "Trail of Broken Hearts" | Appears on the Days of Thunder soundtrack, and later as a B-side to "Love and Understanding" |
| 1992 | "Just Begin Again" | A duet with Spinal Tap appears on the album Break Like The Wind. |
| 1994 | "It Ain't Necessarily So" | Appears on the album The Glory of Gershwin featuring Larry Adler playing the piano and harmonica. |
| 1996 | "A Dream Is a Wish Your Heart Makes" | Appears on the compilation For Our Children Too!: To Benefit Pediatric AIDS Foundation. |
| 1999 | "Don't Come Cryin' to Me" | Originally recorded for Heart of Stone, but eventually released on earlier editions of If I Could Turn Back Time: Cher's Greatest Hits. |
| 1999 | "Crimson and Clover" | A duet with her second son Elijah Blue Allman, appears in the 1999 soundtrack of the film A Walk on the Moon. |
| 1999 | "Proud Mary" (live) | A live collaboration with Tina Turner and Elton John for Divas Live '99 appeared on the album on the album release of the concert. |
| 1999 | "If I Could Turn Back Time" (live) | A live performance for Divas Live '99 also appeared on the album. |
| 1999 | "Christmas (Baby Please Come Home)" | A duet with Rosie O'Donnell, appears on the christmas album A Rosie Christmas. |
| 1999 | "Smoke Gets in Your Eyes" | Cher performed the song in character as Elsa Morganthal in Tea with Mussolini. The soundtrack was not released. |
| 2000 | "Tell Me (You're Coming Back)" | Performed by rock band Majic Ship from the album Songwaves Project, Cher sings backing vocals. |
| 2002 | "Believe" (live) | A live performance for Divas Las Vegas appeared on the album release of the concert. |
| 2002 | "(This Is) A Song for the Lonely" (live) | A live performance for Divas Las Vegas also appeared on the album. |
| 2002 | "Heartbreak Hotel" (live) | Cher contributed to the Elvis Presley medley at Divas Las Vegas. Also appeared on the album. |
| 2011 | "The Greatest Thing" | A duet with Lady Gaga that was not released. A demo version leaked online. |
| 2011 | "More Than a Feeling" | A cover of the song was recorded by the cast of the film, Zookeeper, including Cher, and appears over the picture's end titles. |
| 2012 | "Silver Wings" | A duet with Cher's goddaughter Jesse Jo Stark, the Merle Haggard cover was released on Cher's YouTube site. It was a "birthday present" to Stark's father, Richard Stark, and a "gift" for Cher fans who were awaiting the as-yet unnamed Closer to the Truth album. |
| 2013 | "I'm Just Your Yesterday" | A duet with Cher's mother, Georgia Holt, appearing on Holt's album Honky Tonk Woman. The snippet of the duet is featured in a television special entitled Dear Mom, Love Cher. |
| 2013 | "Crying Time" | A song by mother, Georgia Holt, appearing on Holt's album Honky Tonk Woman. Cher sings backing vocals. |
| 2015 | N/A | Cher contributed vocals to two tracks for the seventh studio album by American hip hop group Wu-Tang Clan, Once Upon a Time in Shaolin. |
| 2017 | "Prayers for This World" | Featured in the 2017 documentary Cries from Syria, written by long-time collaborator Diane Warren. |
| 2017 | "Everyday People" | A duet with Future, recorded for a GAP commercial. It wasn't released. |
| 2017 | "You Do You Boov" | A duet with the cast of Home: Adventures with Tip & Oh, which appears in the episode "Chercophonie" that guest starred Cher. |
| 2025 | "Found Someone" | Cher features on rapper Tyga's album NSFW; the song heavily samples Cher's single "I Found Someone". |

== See also ==
- Cultural impact of Cher
- Cher albums discography
- Sonny & Cher discography
- List of songs recorded by Cher
- List of artists who reached number one in the United States
- List of number-one dance hits (United States)
- List of artists by total number of UK number-one singles
- List of artists who reached number one on the U.S. dance chart
