= Guy Scheiman =

Israeli musical artist

Guy Scheiman גיא שמיימן
- Born: 1994 (age 31–32); Tel Aviv, Israel
- Genres: Dance/Electronic
- Occupations: DJ, Remixer and Music producer
- Label: Guy Scheiman Music
- Website: guyscheiman.com

Guy Scheiman (Hebrew: גיא שמיימן) is an Israeli DJ, remixer and music producer known for his official remixes and productions.

== Career ==
He has performed as a DJ in several club appearances and notable international events across the globe.

In 2015, Scheiman founded his own record label named Guy Scheiman Music. He has collaborated with Inaya Day, Katherine Ellis, Amuka, and other Diva singers. He also collaborated with DJs and musicians such as Tony Moran, Nina Flowers, and was a part of Bent Collective.

In 2020, Scheiman was nominated for the 18th Annual Independent Music Awards.

== Discography ==
=== Albums ===
Year	Album
2017	Best of 2017
2018	The Circuit Collection
2018	Best of 2018
2019	Holiday Unreleased Collection 2018
2019	Acapellas
2019	Around The Globe
2019	Best Of 2019
2020	Rise Up
2021	Guy Scheiman Music - Club Essentials, Vol. 1
2021	Guy Scheiman Music - Club Essentials, Vol. 2

=== Notable Releases ===
Year	Title	Artists
2016	The Club	
2016	Say A little Prayer	Katherine Ellis
2017	Let’s Get Physical	Michal Shapira
2017	Stand Up with	Amuka
2018	Special Love	Inaya Day
2019	Dancing In The Dark	Marcos Adam
2019	Fierce Queen	Nina Flowers
2020	Stay The F*ck Home	Alan T
2021	Rise Up	Marcos Adam
2021	High Energy	Inaya Day

=== Notable Remixes ===
Year	Title	Artists
2012	Wild Ones	Flo Rida feat. Sia
2012	What About Us	The Saturdays
2013	Applause	Lady Gaga
2013	What Now	Rihanna
2014	You’re Not Alone	Amy Grant
2014	I Walk Alone	Cher
2016	L'amour Est En Vie	Julie Pietri
2018	Gimme! Gimme! Gimme! (A Man After Midnight)	Cher
2018	Over ME	Inaya Day, Ultra Naté
2020	Fantastico The International Remixes	Charo
2020	It's Not The Last Time	InfectedSun & Justin Kayser

== See also ==
- What About Us (The Saturdays song)
- Gimme! Gimme! Gimme! (A Man After Midnight)
- Trenyce
- What Now (song)
- I Was Gonna Cancel
