= I Walk Alone (disambiguation) =

I Walk Alone is a 1947 film noir.

I Walk Alone may also refer to:

- "I Walk Alone" (Marty Robbins song), a 1968 number one country music song by Marty Robbins
- "I Walk Alone" (Tarja song), released in 2007 by Tarja
- "I Walk Alone" (Cher song), a 2013 song by Cher from Closer to the Truth.
- "I Walk Alone", from the 1995 Carnival of Souls: The Final Sessions studio album by Kiss
- "I Walk Alone", a 1999 song by the post-grunge band Oleander, appearing on the album February Son
- "I Walk Alone", a song by Saliva on the 2006 WWE Wreckless Intent compilation album, as Dave Batista's entrance theme
- "I Walk Alone", a 2008 song on The Crucible of Man: Something Wicked Part 2 by Iced Earth
- "I Walk Alone", a song by Raw Solution, used as the entrance theme for German wrestler Bad Bones (2014–current)

== See also ==
- "Boulevard of Broken Dreams" (Green Day song), sometimes misinterpreted as "I Walk Alone"
- "I'll Walk Alone", a 1944 song
