= Dressed to Kill Tour (Cher) =

2014 concert tour by Cher

- Concert tour by Cher
- Promotional poster for the tour
- Location: North America
- Associated album: Closer to the Truth
- Start date: March 22, 2014
- End date: July 11, 2014
- Legs: 1
- No. of shows: 49
- Supporting acts: Cyndi Lauper; Pat Benatar & Neil Giraldo
- Attendance: 610,413
- Box office: US$55,112,056

Cher concert chronology
- Cher (2008–11); Dressed to Kill Tour (2014); Classic Cher (2017–20)

The Dressed to Kill Tour was the sixth solo concert tour by American singer-actress Cher. Launched in support of her twenty-fifth studio album, Closer to the Truth (2013), it started in Phoenix, Arizona on March 22, 2014 and continued across North America before coming to a close in San Diego on July 11, 2014. The tour has received mostly positive reception from critics, who praised Cher's vocal performance as well as the several costumes and show elements.

Pat Benatar and Neil Giraldo were listed as "special guests" for the first 13 dates from March 22, 2014 to April 12, 2014 and Cyndi Lauper for the further 36 shows from April 23, 2014 through July 11, 2014. On November 21, 2014, after numerous delays in the planned launch of the second leg of the tour, Cher announced that she had prematurely aborted the tour due to health problems. Despite the cancellation of the 2nd leg, the tour made its way onto the Pollstar's Top 20 Worldwide Tours of 2014 list, ranking at number 19 with a gross of $55 million and more than 600,000 tickets sold.

== Background and development ==
On September 23, 2013, Cher visited The Today Show aired on NBC where she performed "Woman's World", "I Hope You Find It" and "Believe". While on the show, Cher announced that she would tour with her twenty-fifth album, Closer to the Truth. When speaking about the tour, Cher stated:

"Being on the road is horrible but the concerts are great. I can understand why bands tear up hotel rooms – it can be a very lonely place – but the only time you have fun is at the concerts."

After the appearance, it was announced through Cher's website that American Express cardmembers would have the first chance to purchase the tickets during the tour pre-sale from September 30, 2013 to October 3, 2013. Tickets that were purchased online included a physical copy of Closer to the Truth.

On May 14, 2014, Cher revealed on The Today Show that the tour would be extended with 27 additional dates across North America, beginning on September 11, 2014. For that second leg, fashion designer and long-time collaborator Bob Mackie had provided a string of new costumes for Cher. He was unable to make a commitment in the first place, and was thus replaced by Hugh Durrant for the first leg.

After several postponements starting shortly before the originally planned launch in September, the second leg of the tour ultimately got cancelled on November 21, 2014; due to Cher recovering from an acute viral infection which affected her kidney function. In an official statement, she indicated to be "devastated," adding she "sincerely hope[s] that we can come back again next year and finish what we started."

== Concert synopsis ==
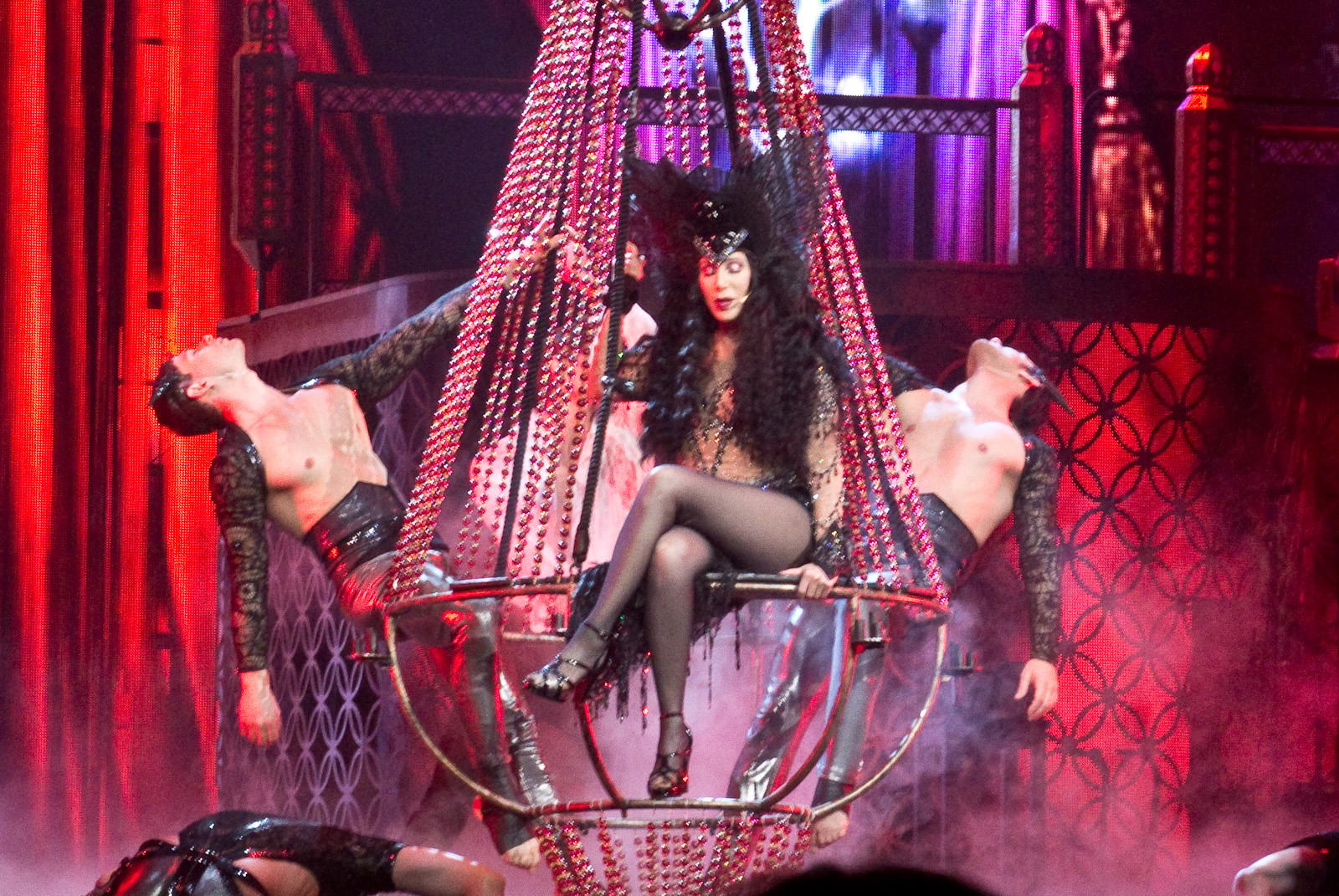
Cher performing during the tour

The show began with Cher atop a pedestal in a glittering gown and feathered headdress singing "Woman's World" surrounded by dancers and backing vocalists; a gladiator-themed performance of "Strong Enough" followed. After she welcomes the audience to the show, a vampire-themed performance of "Dressed to Kill" came next, ending with Cher biting dancer Joe Slaughter's neck. An interlude plays and Cher returns to sing "The Beat Goes On" and "I Got You Babe", the latter with footage of her late-husband Sonny Bono appearing on the video screens behind her.

The third segment saw Cher's dancers paraded around the main floor as she sang "Gypsys, Tramps & Thieves" and "Dark Lady" before donning a floor-length Native American headdress to sing "Half-Breed." After a brief interlude featuring clips from Cher's films, the singer then paid tribute to her appearance in Burlesque with "Welcome to Burlesque" and "You Haven't Seen the Last of Me."

The fifth act began with a performance of "Take It Like a Man", where Cher emerged from atop a gilded Trojan horse wearing a Helen of Troy-inspired gladiator outfit alongside her dancers. She then dedicated her cover of Marc Cohn's "Walking in Memphis" to the moment when she and her mother saw Elvis Presley live in concert. Cher followed the performance with the hits "Just Like Jesse James", "Heart of Stone" and "The Shoop Shoop Song (It's in His Kiss)".

The final act had Cher changing into her famous black see-through bodysuit to perform "I Found Someone" and "If I Could Turn Back Time". She closed the main set with "Believe", after changing in a jeweled bodysuit, like the one from her Vegas residency show. She then exited for a final costume change, and returned to close the concert with "I Hope You Find It" as she was raised up on a platform and flown above the audience amid sparkling lights.

== Critical reception ==
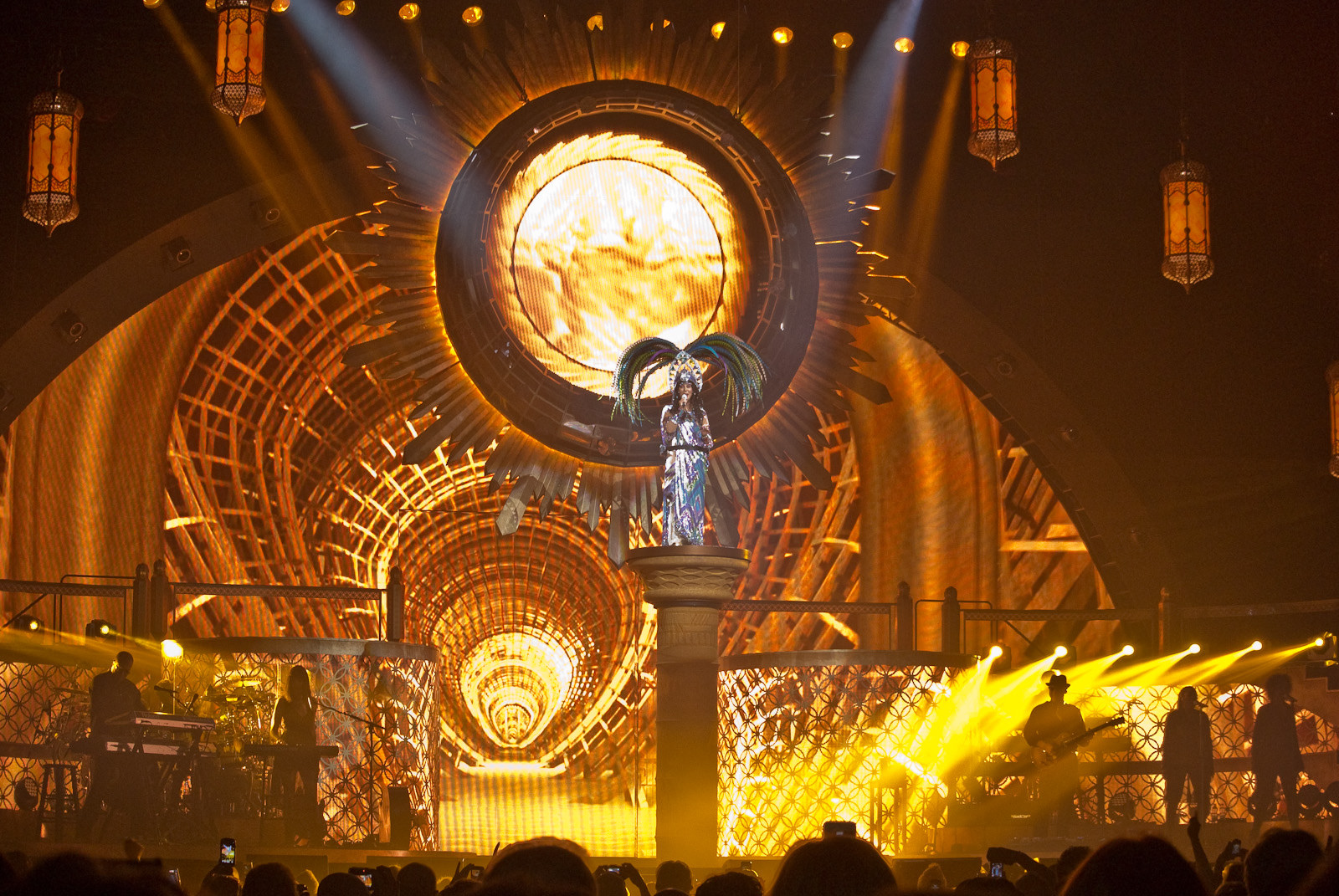
Cher opening the show with "Woman's World" during the tour

Joey Guerra from the Houston Chronicle gave a positive review from her performance in Houston, writing: "There's no one quite like Cher. And there's nothing quite as spectacular as a Cher show." Tiney Ricciardi from the Dallas Morning News praised her performance in Dallas, writing that the singer "wowed the audience with exact vocal execution" and "looked fabulous doing it." Eva Raggio from the Dallas Observer also acclaimed the show in Dallas, writing Cher "brought Vegas to Dallas and delivered the greatest spectacle of the year." Jerry Wofford from the Tulsa World was impressed with the show, commenting on the singer's humor and vocal power, writing: "She was carefree and irreverent and hilarious." Dave McKenna from The Washington Post called the performance in Washington D.C. "outrageous" and "gutsy", while noting there were "plenty of nods to the old days." Ben Rayer writing for The Star gave the singer's performance in Toronto three out of four stars, writing that "the 67-year old's performance sent tidal waves of elation through the arena." James Reed from The Boston Globe praised her performance at the TD Garden, writing the singer was "in exceptional form, as a singer and entertainer." Chris Azzopardi writing for Between the Lines gave a positive review at the performance in Detroit, calling the show "jaw-dropping, frilly, and elaborately produced." Jeff Miers from The Buffalo News wrote her performance in Buffalo offered a "visceral thrill, one that everyone appeared to be willing to indulge in." Tony Lofaro from the Ottawa Citizen praised the concert in Ottawa writing Cher is "a pop diva supreme with timeless quality and an over-worked Vegas patter with just enough titillating sexiness to send everybody home giddy."

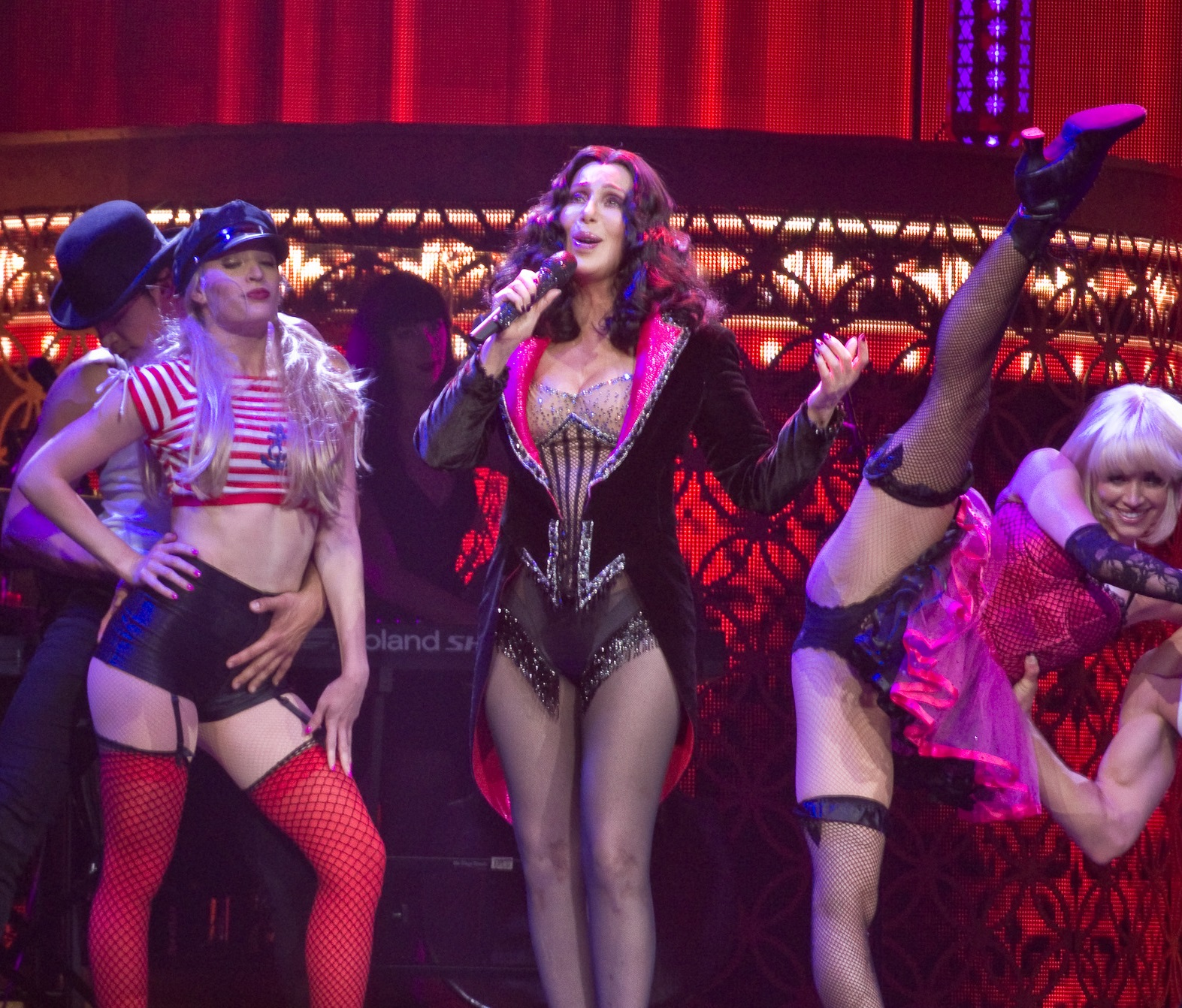
Cher performing during the tour

A.D. Amorosi from Philly.com wrote that the singer's voice in Philadelphia was "delicious, filled with deep, long vowels, even when iced-over by Auto-Tune robotics." Laura DeMarco writing for The Plain Dealer commented on her performance in Cleveland, writing Cher "did not disappoint on her aptly dubbed tour" and the show was "full-on entertainment, from the fashion to the sounds of the set." Jim Farber from the New York Daily News wrote her joyful performance in New York City "came from its mission to defy common notions of taste, age and even self-parody." Melissa Ruggieri from Access Atlanta gave a positive review of the performance in Atlanta calling the singer "irreplaceable" and writing Cher's shows are "spectacles that are embellished to the point of excess." Jim Abbott from the Orlando Sentinel noted there was "plenty of heart in Cher's spectacle" and "enough humor and shoot-from-the-hip candor to humanize the flashy excesses." Timothy Finn from the Kansas City Star wrote the singer "justified her eminence" with a performance "that showcased her career in music, television and film and showed off her physical endurance, which is still impressive, especially for a 68-year-old." Francois Marchand from the Vancouver Sun wrote the show was "an elaborate display that took fans on an aural and visual trip down memory lane," and adding it "was eye candy and glitter galore throughout." Mikael Wood writing for the Los Angeles Times praised the performance at Staples Center writing the concert felt "reassuringly human, even low-key at points."

== Commercial performance ==
On May 29, 2014 it was reported by Billboard that the Dressed to Kill Tour had claimed the No. 1 spot on their weekly ranking of Hot Tours with more than $15.5 million in revenue. From April 23 through May 17, 2014, Cher sold 177,239 tickets, each show during that period being a sell-out. Since the tour's launch on March 22, 2014, a total of 340,000 tickets with a gross of over $30 million had been sold through the show on May 17. The Izod Center in New Jersey had drawn the largest crowd with 14,893 people in attendance. Toronto's Air Canada Centre held the record of highest sales total since the beginning of the tour, with $1.7 million in revenue from an April 7, 2014 performance.

The first leg of the tour, which spanned 49 dates across North America, grossed a total of $55.1 Million, as reported by Billboard on July 15, 2014. One of the most lucrative concert tours of 2014, it has been attended by 610,413 people so far. The MGM Grand Garden Arena in Las Vegas produced the largest gross of the first leg, earning $1.75 Million via a concert on May 25.

On Pollstar's Mid Year Top 100 Worldwide Tours list, released in July 2014 and ranking tours up until that date, the "Dressed to Kill" tour was ranked at number 9 with $48.5 million in grosses and 538,707 tickets sold. On Pollstar's Top 20 Worldwide Tours of 2014 list, the "Dressed to Kill" tour was ranked at number 19 with $54.8 million in grosses and 608,435 tickets sold.

== Set list ==
This set list is representative of the performance in Kansas City. It does not represent all concerts for the duration of the tour.

1. "Woman's World"
2. "Strong Enough"
3. "Dressed to Kill"
4. "The Beat Goes On"
5. "I Got You Babe"
6. "Gypsys, Tramps & Thieves"
7. "Dark Lady"
8. "Half-Breed"
9. "Welcome to Burlesque"
10. "You Haven't Seen the Last of Me"
11. "Take It Like a Man"
12. "Walking in Memphis"
13. "Just Like Jesse James"
14. "I Found Someone"
15. "If I Could Turn Back Time"
16. "Believe"

Encore

17. "I Hope You Find It"
Notes
- On the first night of the show Cher performed "The Shoop Shoop Song (It's in His Kiss)".
- During the concerts in Phoenix, Toronto, Buffalo, and Montreal, Cher performed "Heart of Stone".

== Shows ==
List of concerts, showing date, city, country, venue, opening act, tickets sold, number of available tickets and amount of gross revenue
Date	City	Country	Venue	Opening act	Attendance	Revenue
North America
March 22, 2014	Phoenix	United States	US Airways Center	Pat Benatar; Neil Giraldo	13,297 / 13,297	$1,054,324
March 24, 2014	Houston	United States	Toyota Center	Pat Benatar; Neil Giraldo	11,641 / 11,641	$1,271,089
March 26, 2014	Dallas	United States	American Airlines Center	Pat Benatar; Neil Giraldo	12,682 / 12,682	$1,326,801
March 28, 2014	North Little Rock	United States	Verizon Arena	Pat Benatar; Neil Giraldo	12,119 / 12,119	$762,902
March 29, 2014	Tulsa	United States	BOK Center	Pat Benatar; Neil Giraldo	11,900 / 11,900	$862,905
March 31, 2014	Nashville	United States	Bridgestone Arena	Pat Benatar; Neil Giraldo	12,977 / 12,977	$1,220,667
April 2, 2014	Pittsburgh	United States	Consol Energy Center	Pat Benatar; Neil Giraldo	13,386 / 13,386	$1,227,856
April 4, 2014	Washington, D.C.	United States	Verizon Center	Pat Benatar; Neil Giraldo	12,922 / 12,922	$1,474,099
April 5, 2014	Uncasville	United States	Mohegan Sun Arena	Pat Benatar; Neil Giraldo	7,022 / 7,022	$1,043,005
April 7, 2014	Toronto	Canada	Air Canada Centre	Pat Benatar; Neil Giraldo	14,825 / 14,825	$1,708,070
April 9, 2014	Boston	United States	TD Garden	Pat Benatar; Neil Giraldo	12,792 / 12,792	$1,341,828
April 11, 2014	Indianapolis	United States	Bankers Life Fieldhouse	Pat Benatar; Neil Giraldo	12,629 / 12,629	$931,481
April 12, 2014	Detroit	United States	Joe Louis Arena	Pat Benatar; Neil Giraldo	14,294 / 14,294	$1,015,326
April 23, 2014	Buffalo	United States	First Niagara Center	Cyndi Lauper	13,459 / 13,459	$1,028,751
April 25, 2014	Montreal	Canada	Bell Centre	Cyndi Lauper	10,814 / 10,814	$926,775
April 26, 2014	Ottawa	Canada	Canadian Tire Centre	Cyndi Lauper	12,059 / 12,059	$946,354
April 28, 2014	Philadelphia	United States	Wells Fargo Center	Cyndi Lauper	13,249 / 13,249	$1,570,731
April 30, 2014	Columbus	United States	Nationwide Arena	Cyndi Lauper	13,358 / 13,358	$1,097,955
May 2, 2014	Cleveland	United States	Quicken Loans Arena	Cyndi Lauper	14,527 / 14,527	$1,029,947
May 5, 2014	Charlotte	United States	Time Warner Cable Arena	Cyndi Lauper	11,477 / 11,477	$776,786
May 7, 2014	Raleigh	United States	PNC Arena	Cyndi Lauper	11,870 / 11,870	$772,703
May 9, 2014 (Note: During Cyndi Lauper's performance at Barclays Center on May 9, 2014 she was joined onstage by Liza Minnelli and Rosie O'Donnell.)	Brooklyn	United States	Barclays Center	Cyndi Lauper	14,309 / 14,309	$1,421,594
May 10, 2014	East Rutherford	United States	Izod Center	Cyndi Lauper	14,893 / 14,893	$1,553,260
May 12, 2014	Atlanta	United States	Philips Arena	Cyndi Lauper	11,337 / 11,337	$1,088,627
May 14, 2014	Jacksonville	United States	Jacksonville Veterans Memorial Arena	Cyndi Lauper	10,794 / 10,794	$868,169
May 16, 2014	Orlando	United States	Amway Center	Cyndi Lauper	12,915 / 12,915	$1,069,734
May 17, 2014	Sunrise	United States	BB&T Center	Cyndi Lauper	12,178 / 12,178	$1,348,709
May 25, 2014	Las Vegas	United States	MGM Grand Garden Arena	Cyndi Lauper	13,027 / 13,027	$1,747,641
May 28, 2014	Denver	United States	Pepsi Center	Cyndi Lauper	11,176 / 11,176	$986,794
May 30, 2014	Lincoln	United States	Pinnacle Bank Arena	Cyndi Lauper	13,165 / 13,165	$1,189,462
May 31, 2014	Kansas City	United States	Sprint Center	Cyndi Lauper	12,904 / 12,904	$1,076,528
June 2, 2014	Louisville	United States	KFC Yum! Center	Cyndi Lauper	13,838 / 13,838	$1,171,984
June 4, 2014	St. Louis	United States	Scottrade Center	Cyndi Lauper	13,463 / 13,463	$1,009,214
June 6, 2014	Milwaukee	United States	BMO Harris Bradley Center	Cyndi Lauper	12,689 / 12,689	$880,575
June 7, 2014	Rosemont	United States	Allstate Arena	Cyndi Lauper	13,375 / 13,375	$1,453,390
June 9, 2014	Des Moines	United States	Wells Fargo Arena	Cyndi Lauper	12,801 / 12,801	$1,016,530
June 11, 2014	Minneapolis	United States	Target Center	Cyndi Lauper	12,196 / 12,196	$1,049,258
June 20, 2014	Winnipeg	Canada	MTS Centre	Cyndi Lauper	11,919 / 11,919	$1,037,570
June 21, 2014	Saskatoon	Canada	Credit Union Centre	Cyndi Lauper	12,874 / 12,874	$931,947
June 23, 2014	Edmonton	Canada	Rexall Place	Cyndi Lauper	13,512 / 13,512	$1,049,770
June 25, 2014	Calgary	Canada	Scotiabank Saddledome	Cyndi Lauper	12,795 / 12,795	$1,141,010
June 27, 2014	Vancouver	Canada	Rogers Arena	Cyndi Lauper	13,575 / 13,575	$1,355,470
June 28, 2014	Seattle	United States	KeyArena	Cyndi Lauper	11,644 / 11,644	$1,160,019
June 30, 2014	Portland	United States	Moda Center	Cyndi Lauper	11,962 / 11,962	$767,846
July 2, 2014	San Jose	United States	SAP Center at San Jose	Cyndi Lauper	12,662 / 12,662	$1,298,251
July 5, 2014	Ontario	United States	Citizens Business Bank Arena	Cyndi Lauper	8,676 / 8,676	$855,212
July 7, 2014	Los Angeles	United States	Staples Center	Cyndi Lauper	12,418 / 12,418	$1,362,733
July 9, 2014	Anaheim	United States	Honda Center	Cyndi Lauper	9,790 / 9,790	$1,021,385
July 11, 2014	San Diego	United States	Valley View Casino Center	Cyndi Lauper	10,227 / 10,227	$809,019
Total					610,413 / 610,413 (100%)	$55,112,056

== Cancelled shows ==
List of cancelled concerts, showing date, city, country, venue and reason for cancellation
Date	City	Country	Venue	Reason
November 9, 2014	Lubbock	United States	United Supermarkets Arena	Viral infection
November 11, 2014	Austin	United States	Frank Erwin Center	Viral infection
November 13, 2014	Corpus Christi	United States	American Bank Center	Viral infection
November 15, 2014	Bossier City	United States	CenturyLink Center	Viral infection
November 17, 2014	Pensacola	United States	Pensacola Civic Center	Viral infection
November 19, 2014	Charleston	United States	North Charleston Coliseum	Viral infection
November 21, 2014	Richmond	United States	Richmond Coliseum	Viral infection
November 23, 2014	Auburn Hills	United States	The Palace of Auburn Hills	Viral infection
December 2, 2014	Allentown	United States	PPL Center	Viral infection
December 4, 2014	Albany	United States	Times Union Center	Viral infection
December 6, 2014	Washington D.C.	United States	Verizon Center	Viral infection
December 8, 2014	Uniondale	United States	Nassau Veterans Memorial Coliseum	Viral infection
December 10, 2014	New York City	United States	Madison Square Garden	Viral infection
December 12, 2014	Newark	United States	Prudential Center	Viral infection
December 13, 2014	Hartford	United States	XL Center	Viral infection
December 15, 2014	New York City	United States	Madison Square Garden	Viral infection
January 5, 2015	Manchester	United States	Verizon Wireless Arena	Viral infection
January 7, 2015	Boston	United States	TD Garden	Viral infection
January 9, 2015	University Park	United States	Bryce Jordan Center	Viral infection
January 11, 2015	Grand Rapids	United States	Van Andel Arena	Viral infection
January 13, 2015	Toronto	Canada	Air Canada Centre	Viral infection
January 15, 2015	Fort Wayne	United States	Allen County War Memorial Coliseum	Viral infection
January 17, 2015	Green Bay	United States	Resch Center	Viral infection
January 19, 2015	Moline	United States	iWireless Center	Viral infection
January 21, 2015	Chicago	United States	United Center	Viral infection
January 23, 2015	Cincinnati	United States	U.S. Bank Arena	Viral infection
January 25, 2015	Sioux Falls	United States	Denny Sanford PREMIER Center	Viral infection
January 27, 2015	Omaha	United States	CenturyLink Center Omaha	Viral infection
January 29, 2015	Wichita	United States	Intrust Bank Arena	Viral infection
February 4, 2015	Fargo	United States	Fargodome	Viral infection

== Personnel ==
Band

- Musical Directors: Ollie Marland and Paul Mirkovich
- Guitar: David Barry
- Bass Guitar: Eva Gardner
- Keyboards: Ollie Marland and Darrell Smith
- Drums: Mark Schulman
- Backing Vocalists: Stacy Campbell and Nikki Tillman
- Dancers: Jackie Dowsett Ballinger, Sagiv Ben Binyamin, Suzanne Easter, Emilie Livingston, Tyne Stecklein, Sumayah McRae, Marlon Pelayo, Ryan Ramirez, Joe Slaughter, Jamal Story, Maximiliano Torandell, Jaymz Tuaileva and Kevin Wilson
