= Dressed to Kill (song) =

2009 song performed by Preston

Single by Preston

from the album Whatever Forever
- Released: August 23 2009
- Length: 3:14
- Label: B-Unique Records
- Songwriters: Samuel Preston, Mark Taylor
- Producer: Mark Taylor

"Dressed to Kill"

Song by Cher

from the album Closer to the Truth
- Released: September 20 2013
- Studio: Metrophonic Studios (London, England)
- Genre: Electropop
- Length: 2:51
- Label: Warner Bros.
- Songwriters: Samuel Preston, Mark Taylor, Cher
- Producer: Mark Taylor

"Dressed to Kill" is a 2009 song by Preston, most notably covered by Cher in 2013. Preston's original was released as a single in the UK from his Whatever Forever LP.

The song samples the introduction from Siouxsie and the Banshees' 1980 single "Happy House."

"Dressed to Kill" was Preston's only single release during the almost four-year hiatus of The Ordinary Boys. The song, however, failed to chart. Because of the failure of the lead single, the album was subsequently shelved by the label.

The song was produced by Mark Taylor, who had also produced Cher's megahit, "Believe." While producing her comeback album, Taylor decided to recycle "Dressed to Kill," which he had co-written with Preston.

== Track listing ==
No.	Title	Length
1.	"Dressed to Kill"	3:14
2.	"Nightcrawlers"	4:15

== Cher cover ==
"Dressed to Kill" was covered by American singer Cher for her 2013 album Closer to the Truth. The song was also included as part of the setlist for the concert tour. Her performance of the song was vampire-themed. Cher's version somewhat alters the lyrics. She changes the line, "You're dressed to kill" to "I'm dressed to kill."
