= The Last Song (soundtrack) =

The Last Song (Original Soundtrack)

Soundtrack album by various artists
- Released: March 23, 2010
- Recorded: 2009
- Length: 59:25
- Label: Hollywood

Singles from The Last Song (Original Soundtrack)
- 1. "When I Look at You" Released: February 16, 2010

The Last Song (Original Soundtrack) is the soundtrack to the 2010 film of the same name directed by Julie Anne Robinson and starred Liam Hemsworth and Miley Cyrus. Released through Hollywood Records on March 23, 2010, the album comprises 17 songs, mostly a collection of original and pre-existing music. Cyrus contributed two songs—"When I Look at You" and "I Hope You Find It"; the former of which was already included in her extended play The Time of Our Lives and subsequently released as a single on February 16, 2010. Other contributors to the album include OneRepublic, Alpha Rev, Allstar Weekend, José González, Maroon 5, Edwin McCain, Eskimo Joe and Aaron Zigman, who also scored the film.

== Background ==
Variety's Anthony D'Alessandro notes that the use of soundtracks as "launch pads" for new Disney artists is a common practice. The song "New Morning" was written by Casey McPherson, frontman of the Alpha Rev band which signed with Disney's Hollywood Records in August 2008. Allstar Weekend, former contestants of the Radio Disney's The Next Big Thing, were signed by Hollywood the following year, and they contributed music for "A Different Side of Me". At the launch of his album Cradlesong on June 30, 2009, Rob Thomas told the New York Daily News, "My buddy Adam Shankman, who just directed Miley's movie, called me on the phone the other day and was like, 'You have to write a song for this movie.'... I would definitely write a song for her [Cyrus]." However, he could not contribute music to the film due to schedule conflicts.

Besides starring as Veronica Miller, Cyrus also contributed two songs for the film: "When I Look at You" was written by Hillary Lindsey and John Shanks and originally included in Cyrus' extended play The Time of Our Lives (2009). A power ballad number, the song was released as a single from the album on February 16, 2010. The soundtrack was released on March 23, 2010, eight days ahead of the film's theatrical release. Though not featured on soundtrack, Snow Patrol's "Shut Your Eyes" (2008) and Feist's "I Feel It All" also appear in the film.

== Commercial performance ==
The album's lead single "When I Look at You" peaked at number 16 on the Billboard Hot 100 chart and at number 24 on the Canadian Hot 100 chart for the week ending April 17, 2010. Another single "I Hope You Find It" debuted at number 8 on the Bubbling Under Hot 100 Singles chart for the week ending April 10, and subsequently peaked at number 5 the following week. In September 2013, the song eventually received significant media attention for being covered by Cher for her 25th studio album Closer to the Truth (2013); her cover version was separately released as a single.

The album debuted at number 172 on the Billboard 200 chart on the week ending April 10, 2010; it peaked to number 104 the following week.

== Track listing ==
The Last Song (Original Soundtrack) track listing
No.	Title	Writer(s)	Artist(s)	Length
1.	"Tyrant"	Andrew Brown, Zachary Filkins, Ryan Tedder	OneRepublic	5:04
2.	"Bring on the Comets"	Mark Guidry, Mark Palgy, Craig Pfunder	VHS Or Beta	4:02
3.	"Setting Sun"	Finlay Beaton, Stuart Macleod, Joel Quartermain	Eskimo Joe	3:49
4.	"When I Look at You"	John Shanks, Hillary Lindsey	Miley Cyrus	4:09
5.	"Brooklyn Blurs"	Alex Wong, Devon Copley	The Paper Raincoat	4:15
6.	"Can You Tell"	Milo Bonacci, Alexandra Lawn, Wesley Miles, John Pike, Mathieu Santos, Rebecca Zeller	Ra Ra Riot	2:41
7.	"Down the Line"	José González	José González	3:10
8.	"Each Coming Night"	Sam Beam	Iron & Wine	3:25
9.	"I Hope You Find It"	Jeffrey Steele, Steven Robson	Miley Cyrus	3:55
10.	"She Will Be Loved"	Adam Levine, James Valentine	Maroon 5	4:16
11.	"New Morning"	Casey McPherson	Alpha Rev	3:44
12.	"Broke Down Hearted Wonderland"	Edwin McCain, Maia Sharp, Pete Riley, Kevin Kinney	Edwin McCain	3:02
13.	"A Different Side of Me"	Nathan Darmody, Zachary Porter, Thomas Norris	Allstar Weekend	3:08
14.	"No Matter What"	Sydnee Duran, Dave Bassett	Valora	3:22
15.	"Heart of Stone"	Sune Rose Wagner	The Raveonettes	3:55
16.	"Steve's Theme"	Aaron Zigman	Aaron Zigman	3:18
Total length:				59:25

== Chart performance ==
Chart performance for The Last Song (Original Soundtrack)
Chart (2010)	Peak position
US Billboard 200	104
US Top Current Album Sales (Billboard)	100
US Top Soundtracks (Billboard)	8

== Accolades ==
Accolades for The Last Song (Original Soundtrack)
Award	Category	Recipient(s) and nominee(s)	Result	Ref.
Teen Choice Awards	Choice Music: Love Song	"When I Look at You" – Miley Cyrus	Won	
