= Ooga Boo =

2017 single by Cher

"Ooga Boo (From Home: Adventures with Tip & Oh)"

Promotional single by Cher
- Released: 15 September 2017
- Length: 1:44
- Label: Back Lot Music
- Songwriters: Alexander Geringas; Todd Garfield
- Producer: Alexander Geringas

Cher singles chronology
"I Walk Alone" (2014)	"Ooga Boo (From Home: Adventures with Tip & Oh)" (2017)	"Fernando" (2018)

Music video
- "Ooga Boo (From Home: Adventures with Tip & Oh)" on YouTube

"Ooga Boo" is a promotional single by American singer and actress Cher, recorded for DreamWorks Animation's Netflix original series Home: Adventures with Tip & Oh. The song was digitally released as a single on September 15, 2017, by Back Lot Music. Cher announced on Twitter that she was unaware of the digital release of the track until the day before the release. It was produced by Alexander Geringas, with lyrics written by Geringas and Todd Garfield. An animated music video featuring Cher as "Chercophonie" was previously released on August 14, 2017.

While the song is mainly targeted at children, critics noted that it is still worth a listen due to its "catchy chorus", sometimes calling it "a bop".

== Background ==
On August 7, 2017, it was announced that Cher would guest star in an episode of the third season of Home: Adventures with Tip & Oh, where she would voice "Chercophonie", an "innovative, avant-garde [...] Boov known for her dissonant music and outrageous fashion sense" who is "so enormously popular that the only way she can go out in public is in disguise." It was also announced that she would sing in the episode.

She recorded vocals for Ooga Boo, a solo by Cher as "Chercophonie", and You Do You Boov, a duet with Rachel Crow as "Tip". However, while both songs appear in the episode, only the former would go on to be released as a single. The song was produced and co-written by composer and songwriter Alexander Geringas, with Todd Garfield serving as the other co-writer.

== Music video ==
A music video produced by DreamWorks Animation and animated by Titmouse, Inc. was released on DreamWorks' official YouTube channel on August 14, 2017. In the video Cher plays a rock diva called "Chercophonie", who wears several outfits throughout the video. It also features the series' characters "Tip" and "Oh".

== Critical reception ==
Billboard's Tatiana Cirisano called the song's music video "psychedelic" and also said that "the song's not just for kids [...] Listen through, and you'll find an electro-pop bop with a worthy message of empowerment and self-love." W's Kyle Munzenrieder stated that "while [it] is all very silly, Cher turns it into a genuine bop, because such is the power of Cher."

Michael Cuby from Paper magazine noted that "Cher's latest song is unexpected [...], but no doubt attention-grabbing" while adding that "of course, it's all brilliant." Writing for Idolator, Mike Wass felt that " Cher is the only diva that could get away with releasing a track called 'Ooga Boo'".

== Track listing ==
Digital download

- "Ooga Boo (From Home: Adventures with Tip & Oh)" – 1:44
