= Take It Like a Man (Cher song) =

Single by Cher

from the album Closer to the Truth
- Released: November 8, 2013
- Recorded: 2013
- Studio: Metrophonic Studios (London, England)
- Genre: Eurodisco; hi-NRG
- Length: 4:10
- Label: Warner Bros.
- Songwriters: Cher; Tim Powell; Tebey Ottoh; Mary Leay
- Producers: Mark Taylor; Tim Powell

Cher singles chronology
"I Hope You Find It" (2013)	"Take It Like a Man" (2013)	"I Walk Alone" (2014)

Music video
- "Take It Like a Man" on YouTube

Alternative cover
- Cover for the Remixes EP

"Take It Like a Man" is a pop-dance track written by Cher, Tim Powell, Tebey Ottoh and Mary Leay. Originally planned as the sophomore single from Cher's twenty-fifth studio album Closer to the Truth, it was ultimately released as the third one. "Take It Like a Man" was released on digital platforms on November 8, 2013 and as a 12" vinyl single on December 16, 2013.

An EP featuring eight remixes with a total length of 1:00:33, was released on January 28, 2014.

Outside of the US, "Take It Like a Man" debuted and peaked at number 48 on the UK Physical Singles chart, staying in the chart for one week.

== Promotion and performances ==
On December 9, 2013, in order to promote "Take It Like a Man", Cher confirmed on her official Twitter account that the single would be featured on the setlist of her 2014 Dressed to Kill Tour, set to start on March 22, 2014 in Phoenix, Arizona.

== Music video ==
A music video for the 7th Heaven remix was released on November 20, 2013. It garnered media attention for featuring Andrew Christian underwear models as well as several porn actors. Models are first shown washing cars with each other's bodies and partying then on a catamaran in the middle of the ocean; they shipwreck and thus get saved by a crew of muscular life guards. The music video ends with a twerk-off between the Tasty & Yummy crew and the Hot Bottoms in an empty storehouse. Footage for the clip was provided by an Andrew Christian underwear commercial.

Cher shared a link to the YouTube video on her official Twitter and Facebook accounts. British LGBT website OUT praised the effort, stating that Cher "truly out-gayed herself with this one". Marc Felion from Feast of Fun sympathetically commented that "this could possibly be the gayest video ever". The music video has created some controversy, being labeled by YouTube with a warning recommending viewing only by those 18 or over. As of September 25 2017, "Take It Like a Man" reached over 1.4 million views.

== Critical reception ==
AllMusic found the song to be one of the album's best. Montreal Gazette called Take It Like a Man a "coy double-entendre" and " shimmering dancefloor swooner".

LGBT website So So Gay was positive: "The vocoder is still very much in play (...). It's so preposterously Hi-NRG with Eurodance beats that it's like going ten rounds with Mike Tyson whilst high on poppers." The Boston Globe deemed the song "essential" and called it a "fiery, heavenly heave". Duke Chronicle was less favorable: "catchy, heavily auto-tuned piece perfectly suited for a dance floor or a girls' night out. The lyrical meaning is relatively arbitrary; to some extent, it's simply words set to a beat." About.com went back in time " "Take It Like a Man" features Believe-era auto-tune effects."

Philly magazine was mixed by calling it "grooving" and "an overt wink to the gay boys who have kept Cher afloat for decades, even if the whole song sounds like she's trapped in that plexiglass booth she stood in for the "Believe" video".

== Track listings ==
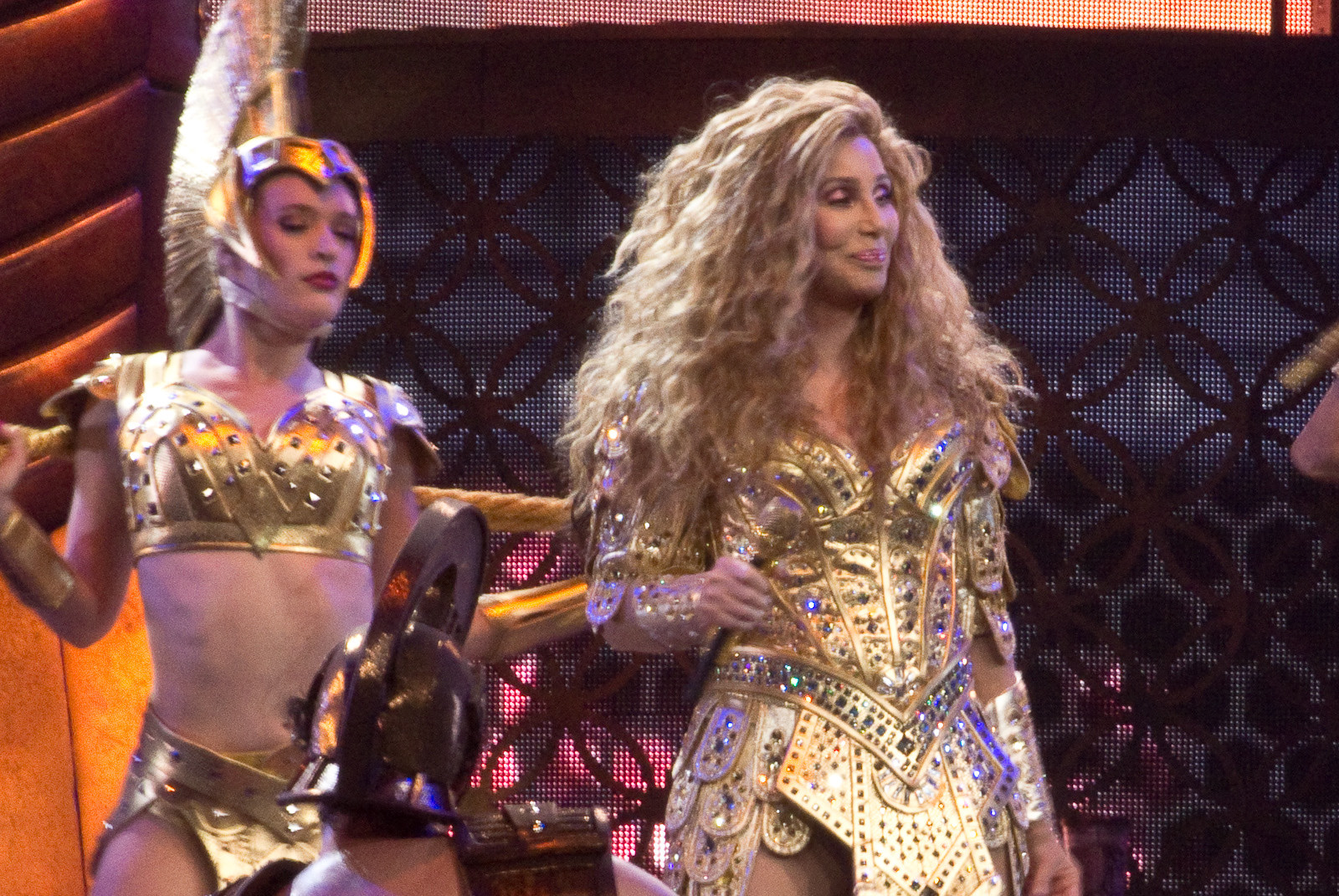
Cher performing "Take It Like a Man" during the Dressed to Kill Tour, 2014

- Take It Like a Man – 12" single / digital single:
1. "Take It Like a Man" – 4:10
2. "Take It Like a Man" (Over-The-Top Mix) – 6:55
3. "Take It Like a Man" (Over-The-Top Edit) – 3:38
4. "Take It Like a Man" (7th Heaven Mix) – 7:52
5. "Take It Like a Man" (7th Heaven Edit) – 4:41
6. "Take It Like a Man" (Over-The-Top Instrumental) – 6:54
- Take It Like a Man – The Remixes – digital EP:
1. "Take It Like A Man" (Tony Moran Destination Club Remix) – 9:20
2. "Take It Like A Man" (JRMX Club Remix) – 7:16
3. "Take It Like A Man" (Paulo & Jackinsky Club Remix) – 7:54
4. "Take It Like A Man" (Dany Cohiba Remix) – 6:17
5. "Take It Like A Man" (Nikno Club Remix) – 6:29
6. "Take It Like A Man" (DJ Laszlo Club Remix) – 8:40
7. "Take It Like A Man" (Myke Rossi Club Remix) – 7:02
8. "Take It Like A Man" (Tony Moran Dub Remix) – 7:35

== Charts ==
=== Weekly charts ===
Chart (2013–14)	Peak position
UK Physical Singles (OCC)	48
US Dance Club Songs (Billboard)	2
US Hot Dance/Electronic Songs (Billboard)	23

=== Year-end charts ===
Chart (2014)	Rank
US Hot Dance Club Songs (Billboard)	38

== Release history ==
Region	Date	Format	Label
Worldwide	November 8, 2013	Digital single	Warner Bros. Records
United Kingdom	December 16, 2013	12" single	Warner Bros. Records
Germany	December 24, 2013	12" single	Warner Bros. Records
United States	January 28, 2014	Digital EP	Warner Bros. Records
