= I Walk Alone (Cher song) =

Single by Cher

from the album Closer to the Truth
- Released: April 25, 2014
- Recorded: 2012
- Studio: Eargasm Studios (Santa Monica, CA); Fishhead Music (Gothenburg, Sweden); Turtle Sound Studios (Weston, CT); Wally World (Davie, FL)
- Genre: Country pop; dance-pop; EDM
- Length: 3:23
- Label: Warner Bros.
- Songwriters: Pink; Billy Mann; Niklas Olovson; Robin Lynch
- Producers: Billy Mann; MachoPsycho

Cher singles chronology
"Take It Like a Man" (2013)	"I Walk Alone" (2014)	"Ooga Boo" (2017)

Music video
- "I Walk Alone" on YouTube

I Walk Alone is a song by American recording artist Cher and the fourth single from her twenty-fifth studio album, Closer to the Truth. Written by fellow pop singer Pink, who also contributed backing vocals, it was produced for the album by Billy Mann and MachoPsycho. "I Walk Alone" was sent to UK pop radio stations in early 2014 as a promotional single. Simultaneously to the start of Cher's Dressed to Kill Tour, the song got serviced to US dance clubs and radio stations, and an extended play featuring nine dance remixes of "I Walk Alone" was released to digital retailers on April 25, 2014.

The song showcases a rather experimental sound, mixing elements of both country and dance-pop with instruments such as a banjo alongside EDM beats. It reached No. 2 on the Billboard Hot Dance Club Songs chart.

== Background ==
Cher first mentioned a collaboration with Pink on June 18, 2012, revealing on her official Twitter that "Alecia wrote two great songs" for her new album, later adding that "Pink is definitely my girl. She's talent. Luv it." Describing "I Walk Alone," she stated that it was both rock and dance and "kicks much ass;" the second song being titled "Lie to Me." On April 8, 2012, Pink confirmed she had written a song for Cher's album, and revealed the title to be "I Walk Alone." She further described the contribution as an "honor," and said "I finally feel like a songwriter. And I'm such a fan."

Around the album's release on September 24, 2013, Cher talked about the two songs written by Pink in an interview with online music magazine Radio.com: "These songs, I just loved from five seconds into them. (...) I understood them, and when you hear them, you'll understand why I understood them. They're so personal, but they work for both of us." The album's title is derived from a lyric in the song. In it, Cher sings "There's a gypsy in me that keeps on roaming, and there's an anger as I get closer to the truth."

On March 14, 2014, Tracy Young's "Ferosh Reconstruction Remix" of "I Walk Alone" premiered on Billboard magazine's official website, being serviced to dance clubs and DJs the following week. According to Young, who had previously remixed Cher's "Woman's World," she was excited about the project for three reasons: "One, stating the obvious, working with Cher again. Secondly, I relate to this song lyrically because it echoes where I am at this moment in my life. Lastly, it was so refreshing because I felt this song is in a perfect tempo and it's also one of my favorites on the album."

== Music video ==
A promotional video for the song was posted on the Cher Fan Club YouTube channel in September 2014. The video is an animated montage of pictures from Cher's life and career going in chronological order from childhood to the present day.

== Track listing ==
I Walk Alone (The Remixes) - EP

1. "I Walk Alone" (Tracy Young Ferosh Reconstruction) – 6:16
2. "I Walk Alone" (Funk Generation H3d Rush Club Mix) – 6:27
3. "I Walk Alone" (Jrmx Club Mix) – 6:38
4. "I Walk Alone" (Ivan Gomez & Nacho Chapado Club Mix) – 7:01
5. "I Walk Alone" (Guy Scheiman Club Mix) – 6:57
6. "I Walk Alone" (DJ Laszlo Club Mix) – 6:27
7. "I Walk Alone" (Morlando Club Mix) – 5:19
8. "I Walk Alone" (Dan Slater Club Mix) – 6:32
9. "I Walk Alone" (NovoGain Club Mix) – 8:22

Other Versions

- 7th Heaven Banging Club Mix - 6:16

== Charts ==
=== Weekly charts ===
Chart (2014)	Peak position
US Hot Dance Club Songs (Billboard)	2

=== Year-end charts ===
Chart (2014)	Rank
US Hot Dance Club Songs (Billboard)	13
