= I Hope You Find It =

2010 song by Miley Cyrus

Song by Miley Cyrus

from the album The Last Song: Original Soundtrack
- Released: March 23, 2010
- Recorded: 2009
- Genre: Country pop; adult contemporary
- Length: 3:55
- Label: Hollywood
- Songwriters: Steven Robson; Jeffrey Steele

"I Hope You Find It" is a country pop and adult contemporary ballad by American entertainer Miley Cyrus. It was written by Steven Robson and Jeffrey Steele for inclusion on the soundtrack of Cyrus' 2010 film The Last Song. Although "I Hope You Find It" was not released as a single from the album, it debuted at #8 on Bubbling Under Hot 100 chart in the week ending April 10, 2010 and peaked at #5 a week later, on the basis of a large amount of digital downloads alone. It dropped out in the week ending April 24, 2010.

The song is played during the final credits of the movie.

The sheet music published at Musicnotes.com by Kobalt Music Publishing America indicates that it is a moderately timed ballad written in the key of Bb major with a tempo of 69 beats per minute.

According to Jackie Willis of Entertainment Tonight, Cher showed Cyrus "the highest form of flattery" by covering her song, after going back on disparaging comments regarding Cyrus' controversial 2013 MTV Video Music Awards performance.

== Chart performance ==
Chart (2010)	Peak position
US Bubbling Under Hot 100 Singles (Billboard)	5

== Cher version ==
"I Hope You Find It"

Single by Cher

from the album Closer to the Truth
- Released: October 4, 2013
- Recorded: 2012
- Studio: Angel Recording Studios (London, England); Metrophonic Studios (London, England)
- Genre: Country pop
- Length: 3:46
- Label: Warner Bros.
- Songwriters: Steven Robson; Jeffrey Steele
- Producer: Mark Taylor

Cher singles chronology
"Woman's World" (2013)	"I Hope You Find It" (2013)	"Take It Like a Man" (2013)

Lyric video
- "Cher - I Hope You Find It [OFFICIAL LYRIC VIDEO]" on YouTube

In 2013, "I Hope You Find It" was covered by American singer Cher, who released it as the second single from her twenty-fifth album Closer to the Truth. Her rendition is prominently a country pop ballad. "I Hope You Find It" became Cher's second biggest radio hit in the United Kingdom in the 21st century, reaching number 20 on the official UK Airplay Chart. On the UK Singles Chart, the song debuted at number 25, becoming Cher's first top-40 hit since "The Music's No Good Without You" in 2001. On September 24, 2013, Cher talked about "I Hope You Find It", calling it "an emotional ballad". She further stated- "Love songs are [usually about] 'I'm looking for love' or 'I've lost love'... They're usually not 'I found love, I lost love, and now I hope you find love with someone else'. Usually we're not that charitable."

=== Critical response ===
The song received generally favorable reviews. John Hamilton of Idolator described that Cher "brings an appropriate world-weariness to the song." Tim Sendra of AllMusic stated that the second half of the album, which also includes "I Hope You Find It", wasn't successful, writing, "These songs aren't as successful, thanks to the somewhat syrupy melodies and clichéd lyrics, but also because Cher's vocals sound a little worn and frayed around the edges." Philip Matusavage of MusicOMH provided a favorable review, writing, "It invokes the Diane Warren-penned Cher classics of old and soars effortlessly in comparison to the laborious grunting of much preceding it."

A critic from So So Gay noted that the song "flexed the oft-overlooked soulful register of Cher's husky contralto." USA Today inducted the song to their download list. Michael Callahan of Philly gave a positive review, writing, "Cher's too-rarely-heard falsetto pierces right to the heart."

=== Live performances and promotion ===
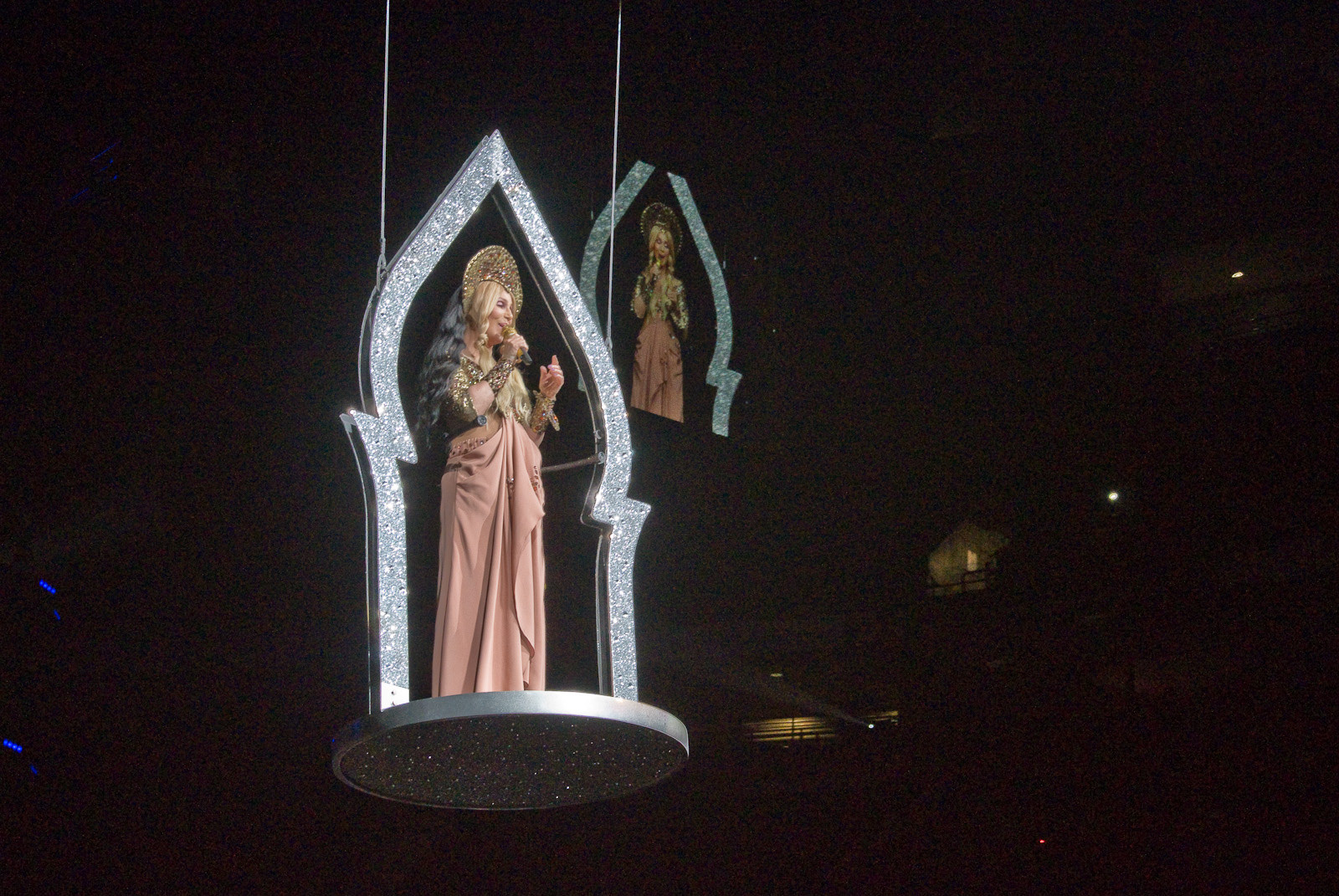
Cher performing "I Hope You Find It" during her 2014 Dressed to Kill Tour. She hovered above the audience during the performance.

On September 23, 2013, Cher performed "I Hope You Find It" for the first time along with "Believe" and the album's lead single "Woman's World" as part of the Today Show concert series. Furthermore, she performed it a day later on CBS's Late Show with David Letterman, on the morning show Live! with Kelly and Michael and in Europe on Wetten, dass..?, The X Factor UK, Vivement dimanche! and The Graham Norton Show. On November 4, 2013, Cher appeared as a guest judge on the eighth week of season 17 of Dancing with the Stars; she performed this song during the course of the program.

To further promote the single, Cher released a lyric video for the song on her official YouTube channel. The video was uploaded on September 24, 2013 and it has since gathered over 4,000,000 views. It includes handwritten letters and cards by Cher. Yahoo! Music provided a positive review for the video, praising the "beautiful treatment of this beautiful song, as well as the bittersweet message Cher delivers".

"I Hope You Find It" was on the setlist of Cher's 2014 Dressed to Kill Tour, where she performed it floating on a grottoed platform above the audience. Brad Wheeler of The Globe and Mail provided a negative review of the performance, writing, "The encore ballad I Hope You Find It was a bum-note ending. Cher performed the song dressed as a sort of religious icon, floating above the crowd in a papalish carrier. She had blessed her fans with her presence, but this was far too much symbolism. Perhaps her pedestal status had gone to her headdress." Dave McKenna of The Washington Post stated that the performance of "'I Hope You Find It" was perhaps a sign that Cher "turned over the outrageous mantle to the younger pop star [Cyrus], known to purvey Cheresque outrageousness."

=== Reception ===
The song debuted at 24 and peaked at no. 17 on Billboard's Adult Contemporary chart. It failed to chart on the Hot 100. It debuted at number 49 on the German Singles Chart, where it became Cher's highest entry in more than ten years. It also entered the charts in Austria and Switzerland, peaking at numbers 43 and 26, respectively. In addition to its Swiss peak, the song also broke into the top forty of the Irish Singles Chart, debuting at number 39. Also notably, "I Hope You Find It" became Cher's second biggest radio hit in the United Kingdom in the 21st century, reaching number 20 on the official UK Airplay Chart, after a 134% increase in radio plays and an audience peak of 20.14 million. On the main UK Singles Chart, the song debuted at number 25, becoming Cher's first top 40 hit since "The Music's No Good Without You" (2001). On the component charts, it entered the UK Physical Singles Sales chart at number 6, while it debut at number 25 on the UK Digital Chart. In Scotland it fared a bit better, debuting at number 22. Cher also became the first artist in UK chart history to have a top forty hit in six consecutive decades, from the 1960s to the 2010s.

In February 2014, "I Hope You Find It" debuted on Billboard's Adult Contemporary chart at number 24, marking Cher's 31st entry on that chart during five decades. The following week, it climbed up to number 20, becoming her highest-charting solo AC hit since "Song for the Lonely" reached number 11 in 2002 and making Cher the only female artist to have a top 20 AC single in 5 consecutive decades. It went on to peak at number 17 and remained in the top 20 for 15 non-consecutive weeks.

=== Chart performance ===
==== Weekly charts ====
Chart (2013–14)	Peak position
Austria (Ö3 Austria Top 40)	43
Germany (Media Control Charts)	49
Ireland (IRMA)	39
Scotland (OCC)	22
Switzerland (Swiss Hitparade)	26
UK Singles (OCC)	25
US Adult Contemporary (Billboard)	17

==== Year-end charts ====
Chart (2014)	Rank
US Adult Contemporary (Billboard)	49

=== Track listings ===
- Digital single
1. I Hope You Find It – 3:46
- I Hope You Find It/Woman's World CD single
1. I Hope You Find It – 3:46
2. Woman's World – 3:49

=== Release history ===
Region	Date	Format	Label
Germany	October 4, 2013	CD single	Warner Music Group
United Kingdom	October 9, 2013	CD single	Warner Music Group
Italy	November 8, 2013	Contemporary hit radio	Warner Music Group
