= Closer to the Truth =

Studio album by Cher
- Released: September 20, 2013
- Recorded: July 2011 – April 2013
- Studios: Angel (London); Eargasm (Santa Monica, CA); Fishhead (Gothenburg); Henson (Hollywood, CA); Metrophonic (London); Stamford Bridge (London); Turtle Sound (Weston, CT); Vine Street Music (Burbank, CA); Wally World (Davie, FL)
- Genre: Dance-pop
- Length: 41:15
- Label: Warner Bros.
- Producers: Cher (exec.); Lindsay Scott (exec.); Paul Oakenfold; Anthony "TC" Crawford; Joshua "J.D." Walker; Jeff Fenster; Mark Taylor; Tim Powell; Josh Crosby; Billy Mann; MachoPsycho; TMS; Timbaland; Jerome Harmon; Ivan Corraliza; Carl Ryden; Matt Serletic

Cher chronology
Icon (2011)	Closer to the Truth (2013)	Dancing Queen (2018)

Singles from Closer to the Truth
- 1. "Woman's World" Released: June 18, 2013; 2. "I Hope You Find It" Released: October 4, 2013; 3. "Take It Like a Man" Released: November 8, 2013; 4. "I Walk Alone" Released: April 25, 2014

Closer to the Truth is the twenty-fifth studio album by American singer and actress Cher. It was released on September 20, 2013, by Warner Bros. Records. Opting to re-establish her music career, she began planning the project in 2011, shortly after her appearance in the movie Burlesque and the conclusion of her residency show at Caesars Palace. Work continued into 2012 and 2013. While the album was initially planned to be pop rock-oriented, Closer to the Truth ultimately became a prominently dance-inspired record. As executive producer, she enlisted longtime collaborator Mark Taylor to work alongside new producers such as Paul Oakenfold, Billy Mann, Timbaland and MachoPsycho to achieve Cher's desired sound.

Described by Cher as "very eclectic" and "her best album ever", Closer to the Truth is primarily a dance-pop record, yet it includes a broader range of various musical genres such as house, synth-pop, EDM, soft rock and country and contains influences by the music of the 1990s. The lyrical themes revolve largely around romance, feminism, individualism and self-empowerment. The album also features additional vocals and songwriting duties from several new partners, including singers Pink and Jake Shears.

The album received generally positive reviews from contemporary music critics, and was a success commercially, debuting and peaking at number three on the U.S. Billboard 200 with first-week sales of 63,000 copies, becoming Cher's highest-peaking solo album on that chart. However, with her album Dancing Queen (2018) debuting at number three on the Billboard 200 with sales of 153,000 copies in its first week, that record is now a tie. As of February 2014, Closer to the Truth has sold 285,000 copies in the country according to Nielsen SoundScan. It was certified gold by Music Canada and silver by BPI. It charted within the top ten in Canada, Germany, Russia, Scotland, the UK, and the US as well as moderately throughout several other international territories.

"Woman's World" was released as the lead single from Closer to the Truth on June 18, 2013, in the United States and Canada, and peaked at number one on the US Billboard Hot Dance Club Songs. The second single, "I Hope You Find It", was released on October 4, 2013, and charted strongly in several European national record charts. It was followed by singles "Take It Like a Man" and "I Walk Alone", both peaking at number two on the US Billboard Hot Dance Club Songs. Cher promoted Closer to the Truth with several television appearances and performances worldwide. She garnered widespread media attention when declined the invitation to perform at the 2014 Winter Olympics because of Russia's anti-LGBT sentiments. Later, Cher embarked on her sixth concert tour titled the Dressed to Kill Tour on March 22, 2014.

On March 30, 2024, it was announced by Dion Singer via Instagram that Closer to the Truth would be re-released on vinyl on June 28, 2024. It was also announced that “Will You Wait for Me” would be included on the digital super deluxe edition of the album. On May 13, 2024, at midnight, the super deluxe edition of Closer to the Truth was unexpectedly released to all streaming services.

== Background and recording ==
Cher's last album, 2001's Living Proof, was supported by her record-breaking world tour, which ended in 2005. After a three-year hiatus, she began a Las Vegas residency and it was then that discussions of a new album began. In December 2008, she was said to be planning a record of 1960s covers, but in 2010 instead turned her attention to a movie comeback in Burlesque. For the film, she recorded two songs, "Welcome to Burlesque" and "You Haven't Seen the Last of Me". During promotion for Burlesque, Cher confirmed she was working on a new album in Nashville. The project's genre was described as southern rock and even country. However, after the success of "You Haven't Seen the Last of Me" on the US Hot Dance Club Songs chart (her seventh number one on that chart), the musical direction of the album changed to dance-oriented pop.

Cher collaborated with Diane Warren, Timbaland, Mark Taylor (who produced her 1998 hit, "Believe") and Kuk Harrell in putting the album together. In 2011, she recorded Lady Gaga's unreleased song, "The Greatest Thing", which was turned into a duet with Gaga and was produced by RedOne. Originally expected for release in September 2011, the song was eventually dropped from the album. A rough demo of the song was leaked on August 13, 2013.

== Content ==
With the release of "Woman's World", Cher announced that the album's working title was Closer to the Truth. The track list includes "Lie to Me" and "I Walk Alone", both written by pop star Pink, and one featuring her vocals; "Take It Like a Man"; and a song written by Cher and Shirley Eikhard called "Lovers Forever". Originally intended for the soundtrack of the 1994 film Interview with the Vampire, it was recorded by Eikhard for her 2005 album Pop, and was produced for Closer to the Truth by Mark Taylor. Cher worked with hip-hop producer Timbaland on "I Don't Have to Sleep to Dream" and covered three songs: "Sirens" by singer-songwriter Nell Bryden, "Dressed to Kill" by Preston and "I Hope You Find It" by Miley Cyrus, from the soundtrack of the 2010 film The Last Song.

Three versions of the album were released. The original version of "You Haven’t Seen the Last of Me" from Burlesque is featured on the deluxe edition as a bonus track. Closer to the Truth was also released on white vinyl. This marks her first vinyl album release since 1991's Love Hurts and 1992's Greatest Hits: 1965–1992. According to critics reactions following an exclusive listening party on August 1, 2013, Closer to the Truth is "a healthy mix between punchy, uptempo dance tracks and big, emotional balladry", while the first half is "stacked with dance-floor anthems", and the latter features "mid-tempo songs and slower numbers, where the lyrics and melodies are highlighted".

Closer to the Truth was promoted a few times for its North America release of September 24, 2013, and in Europe for its worldwide unveiling a week later.

== Promotion ==
=== Singles and videos ===
In October 2012, clips from the unannounced lead single leaked online. "Woman's World" was officially made available for online streaming on Thanksgiving 2012 and eventually released on June 18, 2013. Written by Matt Morris, Paul Oakenfold and Anthony Crawford, the single went to no. 1 on the Billboard dance chart. Cher performed it on the season finale of, The Voice; at New York City's gay pride event, Dance on the Pier; and at Macy's 4th of July Fireworks Spectacular. A music video, directed by Ray Kay, was released on August 20, 2013.

The second single, "I Hope You Find It", premiered on September 23, 2013, during Cher's Today Show concert, where she also performed "Woman's World" and "Believe". It was further performed on the Late Show with David Letterman on September 24, 2013, on Live! with Kelly and Michael on October 1, 2013, and on German TV show Wetten, dass..? on October 5, 2013. She then continued promotion of the single in the UK, performing on The X Factor on October 13, 2013, on The Graham Norton Show on October 18, 2013, and then on Vivement dimanche! in Paris on November 24, 2013. An official lyric video for the single was released on September 24, 2013. In 2014 "I Hope You Find It" debuted on Billboard's Adult Contemporary chart at number 24, becoming Cher's 31st entry on that chart during the course of five decades.

"Take It Like a Man" was released as a digital single with four remixes and an instrumental on November 8, 2013, in Germany and three days later worldwide. Cher garnered media attention with a music video for the 7th Heaven Remix, released on November 20, 2013. It features Andrew Christian underwear models as well as several gay porn stars, such as Antonio Biaggi. A remixes edition with eight further remixes of "Take It Like a Man" was released digitally on January 28, 2014. It peaked at number two on the US Dance Club Songs chart, as well as number nine on the US Hot Dance Singles Sales and number 23 on the US Hot Dance/Electronic Songs chart.

"Sirens" was included in the digitally-released album Songs for the Philippines, a fund-raising project for the victims of Typhoon Haiyan in the country.

"I Walk Alone" was sent to UK pop radio stations in early 2014. On March 14, 2014, Tracy Young's "Ferosh Reconstruction Remix" of "I Walk Alone" premiered on Billboard's official website, being serviced to dance clubs and DJs the following week. An Extended play featuring nine remixes of "I Walk Alone" was released to digital retailers on April 25, 2014. It peaked at number two on the US Dance Club Songs Chart.

=== Dressed to Kill Tour ===
The Dressed to Kill Tour in support of Closer to the Truth, which launched on March 22, 2014, in Phoenix, Arizona, was officially announced on September 23, 2013. It is titled after the album's song of the same name. The tour went on to gross over $55 million and attracted over 600,000 fans.

== Critical reception ==
Professional ratings
Aggregate scores
Source	Rating
Metacritic	61/100
Review scores
Source	Rating
About.com	4/5 stars
AllMusic	3/5 stars
The Guardian	3/5 stars
MusicOMH	2/5 stars
The Montreal Gazette	3/5 stars
Newsday	B+
New York Daily News	4/5 stars
PopMatters	7/10
Slant Magazine	2.5/5 stars
USA Today	4/4 stars

Closer to the Truth garnered generally positive reviews from music critics. At Metacritic, which assigns a normalized rating out of 100 to reviews from mainstream critics, the album has an average score of 61 based on six reviews, indicating "generally favorable reviews". At USA Today, Jerry Shriver told that the release was "huge fun, lyrically substantive (as these things go) and emotionally wide-ranging, and it appeals beyond her fan base." Jim Farber of New York Daily News wrote that "The material isn't quite so individual", yet noted that "At root, the new disc pleases by this sole measure: It's deeply, madly Cher." At Newsday, Glenn Gamboa evoked that "Cher doesn't just survive here, she thrives." Kevin Catchpole of PopMatters affirmed that "Cher has provided a welcome return to the music world with Closer to the Truth."

Gay Times felt the album was "a fantastic, if long-overdue, return from one of the greatest singers of our time." At So So Gay, Ed Brody highlighted that the release was "anything but a meek return to the spotlight for one of pop's most enduring and resilient emissaries", and proclaimed this was "a fantastically strong renaissance album." Bill Lamb of About.com called it "well balanced with the first half amounting to an uptempo dance suite and the second half explore more ballad territory."

However, AllMusic told that the album was "not terrible by any stretch, but the first half of the album is so much fun that this half suffers in comparison. An entire album of disco ball-shattering dance songs may have been too much and worn out its welcome." At The Montreal Gazette, Mark J. LePage felt that the release was "kind of like a miracle, and kind of sad and kind of heroic that it even exists." Slant Magazine's Sal Cinquemani wrote that the album "not only perpetuates this exhausted (and exhausting) formula, but fails to attempt to reinvent it in even the most minute ways."

At The Guardian, Caroline Sullivan said that "The first half of the album is a similar campstravganza – Take It Like a Man indeed – but the second peters out into MOR." At The Boston Globe, Michael Andor Brodeur gave a mixed review, when he highlighted that the album was "presumably designed for the drive home from the club, seems to insist she’s more than a remix ingredient or Auto-tune fodder." Philip Matusavage of MusicOMH criticized much of the album as "generic" and "formulaic", describing it as lacking invention while finding some of its later material more effective.

== Commercial performance ==
In the United States, Closer to the Truth sold 63,000 copies in its first week of release and debuted at number three on the Billboard 200, becoming Cher's highest-charting solo album. However, with her album Dancing Queen (2018) debuting at number three on the Billboard 200 with sales of 153,000 copies, that record is now a tie. It spent three out of its first four weeks on the Billboard 200 within the top ten. As of February 2014 the album has sold over 285,000 copies in the US. In the UK the album debuted at number four, giving Cher her first top-five studio album there since 1991's Love Hurts, with 14,621 copies, and was still in the top ten the next two weeks selling respectively 8,281 and 7,829 copies, ultimately receiving a Silver certification by the BPI for the sales of over 60,000 copies. The album was certified Gold in Canada in November 2013 for the sales of 40,000 copies. As of March 2017 the album has sold 585,000 copies worldwide. The album was nominated for a World Music Award for World's Best Album.

During the week of July 7, 2024, Closer To the Truth re-entered the Scottish albums chart at number 97. It also re-entered the physical albums chart at number 92, and debuted at number 34 on the vinyl albums chart.

== Track listing ==
Credits adapted from the liner notes of Closer to the Truth.

Closer to the Truth – North American standard edition and LP edition
No.	Title	Writer(s)	Producer(s)	Length
1.	"Woman's World"	Matt Morris; Paul Oakenfold; Anthony "TC" Crawford; Joshua "J.D." Walker	Oakenfold; Crawford^{[a]}; Walker^{[a]}; Jeff Fenster^{[a]}	3:42
2.	"Take It Like a Man"	Tim Powell; Tebey Ottoh; Mary Leay; Cher	Mark Taylor; Powell^{[b]}	4:10
3.	"My Love"	Dario Brigham-Bowes; Lorne Ashley Brigham-Bowes; Paul Barry; Greta Svabo Bech	Taylor	3:32
4.	"Dressed to Kill"	Taylor; Samuel Preston; Cher	Taylor	2:51
5.	"Red"	Laura Pergolizzi; Marc Nelkin; Carl Ryden	Josh Crosby; Walker^{[a]}; Fenster^{[a]}	3:06
6.	"Lovers Forever"	Cher; Shirley Eikhard	Taylor	4:01
7.	"I Walk Alone"	Alecia Moore; Billy Mann; Niklas "Nikey" Olovson; Robin Lynch	Mann; MachoPsycho	3:23
8.	"Sirens"	Taylor; Patrick Mascall; Nell Bryden; JP Jones	Taylor	5:03
9.	"Favorite Scars"	Wayne Anthony Hector; Tom Barnes; Peter Kelleher; Ben Kohn	TMS	4:26
10.	"I Hope You Find It"	Steve Robson; Jeffrey Steele	Taylor	3:46
11.	"Lie to Me"	Moore; Mann	Mann	3:19
Total length:				41:15

Closer to the Truth – International digital low-priced edition (bonus track)
No.	Title	Writer(s)	Producer(s)	Length
12.	"You Haven't Seen the Last of Me" (original version)	Diane Warren	Matt Serletic	3:34
Total length:				44:57

Closer to the Truth – 2024 LP edition (bonus tracks)
No.	Title	Writer(s)	Producer(s)	Length
12.	"Pride"	Laura Pergolizzi; Marc Nelkin; Carl Ryden	Ryden; Walker^{[a]}; Fenster^{[a]}	4:17
13.	"You Haven't Seen the Last of Me" (original version)	Warren	Matt Serletic	3:34
Total length:				49:14

Closer to the Truth – North American deluxe edition and international standard edition (bonus tracks)
No.	Title	Writer(s)	Producer(s)	Length
12.	"I Don't Have to Sleep to Dream"	McKee; Sheehan; Mosley; Harmon; Godbey	Timbaland; Harmon^{[b]}; Corraliza^{[a]}	4:42
13.	"Pride"	Pergolizzi; Nelkin; Ryden	Ryden; Walker^{[a]}; Fenster^{[a]}	4:17
14.	"You Haven't Seen the Last of Me" (original version)	Warren	Matt Serletic	3:34
Total length:				53:56

Closer to the Truth – 2024 digital super deluxe edition (bonus track)
No.	Title	Writer(s)	Producer(s)	Length
15.	"Will You Wait for Me"	Mann; Don Cook	Mann	3:32
Total length:				57:28

Closer to the Truth – Target and international CD deluxe edition (bonus tracks)
No.	Title	Writer(s)	Producer(s)	Length
15.	"Woman's World" (R3hab Remix)	Anthony "TC" Crawford; Matt Morris; Paul Oakenfold; Joshua "J.D." Walker	Oakenfold; Crawford^{[a]}; Walker^{[a]}; Jeff Fenster^{[a]}; R3hab (remix)	4:02
16.	"Woman's World" (Jodie Harsh Remix)	Anthony "TC" Crawford; Matt Morris; Paul Oakenfold; Joshua "J.D." Walker	Oakenfold; Crawford^{[a]}; Walker^{[a]}; Jeff Fenster^{[a]}; Jodie Harsh (remix)	6:17
17.	"Will You Wait for Me"	Mann; Cook	Mann	3:32
Total length:				67:38

Notes

- ^{^a} signifies an additional producer
- ^{^b} signifies a co-producer
- "Take It Like a Man" contains additional vocals from Jake Shears.
- "I Walk Alone" contains background vocals from Pink.

== Personnel ==
Credits for Closer to the Truth adapted from AllMusic.

- Josie Aiello – background vocals
- Tom Barnes – composer, drums
- Paul Barry – composer
- Dario Brigham-Bowes – composer
- Lorne Ashley Brigham-Bowes – composer, keyboards, programming
- Greta Svabo Bech – composer
- Gina Brooke – make-up
- Nell Bryden – composer
- Sandy Buglass – guitar
- Rita Campbell – background vocals
- Jon Castelli – mixing engineer
- Jon Chen – A&R
- Cher – composer, executive producer, primary artist
- Bianca Claxton – background vocals
- Ryan Corey – art direction, design
- Anthony "TC" Crawford – additional production, composer
- Josh Crosby – producer
- Dario Darnell – keyboards, programming
- Roger Davies – management
- Justin Derrico – acoustic guitar
- Shirley Eikhard – composer
- Jeff Fenster – A&R, additional production
- Serban Ghenea – mixing
- Josh Gudwin – engineer, vocal engineer
- John Hanes – engineer
- Kuk Harrell – engineer, vocal engineer, vocal producer, background vocals
- Wayne Hector – composer
- Jeri Heiden – art direction, design
- JP Jones – composer
- Pete Kelleher – keyboards, background vocals
- Peter Kelleher – composer
- Ben Kohn – composer, guitar
- Miguel Lara – assistant
- Mary Leay – composer
- Lee Levin – drums
- Robin Lynch – composer, electric guitar
- MachoPsycho – engineer, keyboard programming, producer
- Marjan Malakpour – stylist
- Billy Mann – arranger, composer, engineer, acoustic and electric guitar, keyboard programming, producer, background vocals
- Stephen Marcussen – mastering
- Patrick Mascall – composer, guitar
- Tony Maserati – mixing
- Machado Cicala Morassut – photography
- Matt Morris – composer, background vocals
- Ryan Nasci – assistant engineer
- Marc Nelkin – composer
- Chris "Tek" O'Ryan – engineer
- Paul Oakenfold – composer, producer
- Niklas "Nikey" Olovson – bass, composer
- Jeanette Olsson – background vocals
- Tebey Ottoh – composer
- Deb Paull – personal assistant
- Laura Pergolizzi – composer
- Adam Phillips – guitar
- Bonnie McKee – composer, background vocals
- Pink – composer
- Tim Powell – composer, keyboards, producer, programming
- Sam Preston – composer, instrumentation
- Steve Price – engineer
- Serena Radaelli – hair stylist
- Steve Robson – composer
- Liz Rosenberg – publicity
- Jennifer Ruiz – personal assistant
- Carl Ryden – composer
- Lindsay Scott – executive producer, management
- Jake Shears – vocals
- Robin Smith – string arrangements
- Ash Soan – drums
- Jeffrey Steele – composer
- Ren Swan – engineer, mixing
- Mark Taylor – composer, instrumentation, keyboards, producer, programming, vocal producer
- TMS – producer
- J.D. Walker – additional production, composer
- Pete Wallace – arranger, bass, engineer, keyboard programming, keyboards
- Dan Warner – electric guitar
- Eric Weaver – engineer
- Allen Wolfe – A&R
- Jonathan Yudkin – composer, string arrangements, strings

== Charts ==
=== Weekly charts ===
2013–14 weekly chart performance for Closer to the Truth
Chart (2013–14)	Peak position
Australian Albums (ARIA)	17
Austrian Albums (Ö3 Austria)	11
Belgian Albums (Ultratop Flanders)	65
Belgian Albums (Ultratop Wallonia)	59
Canadian Albums (Billboard)	4
Croatian Albums (HDU)	18
Czech Albums (ČNS IFPI)	25
Danish Albums (Hitlisten)	26
Dutch Albums (Album Top 100)	41
Finnish Albums (Suomen virallinen lista)	41
French Albums (SNEP)	93
German Albums (Offizielle Top 100)	6
Hungarian Albums (MAHASZ)	20
Irish Albums (IRMA)	22
Italian Albums (FIMI)	19
Mexican Albums (Top 100)	52
Quebec Albums (ADISQ)	23
Russian Albums (2M)	9
Scottish Albums (OCC)	5
South Korean Albums (Gaon)	40
Spanish Albums (Promusicae)	32
Swedish Albums (Sverigetopplistan)	45
Swiss Albums (Schweizer Hitparade)	11
UK Albums (Official Charts)	4
US Billboard 200	3

2024 weekly chart performance for Closer to the Truth
Chart (2024)	Peak position
Scottish Albums (OCC)	97
UK Official Vinyl Albums (OCC)	34

=== Year-end charts ===
2013 year-end chart performance for Closer to the Truth
Chart (2013)	Rank
UK Albums (OCC)	177
US Billboard 200	121

2014 year-end chart performance for Closer to the Truth
Chart (2014)	Position
US Billboard Top Current Album Sales	199

== Certifications and sales ==
Certifications and sales for Closer to the Truth
Region	Certification	Certified units/sales
Canada (Music Canada)	Gold	40,000^{^}
United Kingdom (BPI)	Silver	60,000^{‡}
United States	—	285,000
Summaries
Worldwide	—	585,000
^{^} Shipments figures based on certification alone.^{‡} Sales+streaming figures based on certification alone.

== Release history ==
Region	Date	Format(s)	Label
Australia	September 20, 2013	CD; digital download	Warner Bros.; Warner Music
Brazil	September 20, 2013	CD; digital download	Warner Bros.; Warner Music
Canada	September 24, 2013	CD; digital download	Warner Bros.; Warner Music
Japan	September 24, 2013	CD; digital download	Warner Bros.; Warner Music
United States	September 24, 2013	CD; digital download	Warner Bros.; Warner Music
France	September 30, 2013	CD; digital download	Warner Bros.; Warner Music
Italy	October 1, 2013	CD; digital download	Warner Bros.; Warner Music
Spain	October 1, 2013	CD; digital download	Warner Bros.; Warner Music
Germany	October 4, 2013	CD; digital download	Warner Bros.; Warner Music
Ireland	October 11, 2013	CD; digital download	Warner Bros.; Warner Music
United Kingdom	October 14, 2013	CD; digital download	Warner Bros.; Warner Music
United States	November 19, 2013	LP	Warner Bros.; Warner Music
