= The Greatest Thing (song) =

Unreleased song by Cher and Lady Gaga

Demo by Cher and Lady Gaga
- Recorded: 2011
- Genre: Dance-pop
- Songwriters: Lady Gaga; RedOne
- Producer: RedOne

"The Greatest Thing" is an unreleased song recorded by the American singers Cher and Lady Gaga. Written by Gaga and RedOne, who also produced it, the song was originally recorded by Gaga before being given to Cher for her studio album Closer to the Truth (2013). After Cher recorded her vocals, Gaga joined the track, turning it into a duet.

The song was initially expected to be released in September 2011 as the lead single from Closer to the Truth, but the release was ultimately cancelled after Gaga expressed dissatisfaction with the recording. Cher later suggested that the recording also needed further work. A demo leaked online in August 2013, prompting criticism from Cher, who said that it was not the version intended for release. The leaked recording received mixed reviews from music critics.

== Background ==
Cher and Lady Gaga first met at the 2010 MTV Video Music Awards on September 12, 2010, where Cher presented Gaga with the Video of the Year award for "Bad Romance". Gaga accepted the award wearing her meat dress and asked Cher to hold its matching purse. Following the ceremony, Cher praised Gaga on Twitter, writing that she "rocked it"; she also described the meat dress as "astonishing" as an art piece and called its matching purse "genius".

In July 2011, Cher revealed that she had recorded "The Greatest Thing", a song Gaga and producer RedOne had given her for her forthcoming album. She clarified that the recording was not a duet, but joked that after holding Gaga's "meat purse", "one can wish". Cher said that she would "love [a] duet with GaGa", described "The Greatest Thing" as a "GREAT Song", and said that she was "beyond grateful" to have received it. Gaga responded to Cher on Twitter, suggesting "a remix duet for the gays". Later that month, NME reported that Gaga was set to join Cher on the recording. Reflecting on the collaboration, Gaga wrote, "Who knew a year ago when I was crying in her arms after she gave me an award, that today we would record a duet", adding to Cher, "You are The Greatest."

The track had originally been recorded as a solo demo by Gaga under the title "The Greatest" with RedOne, who had previously worked extensively with her on her debut album, The Fame (2008). Writing about the demo in 2011, Bradley Stern of MuuMuse said that it sounded "very post-1998 Cher", citing its heavily Auto-Tuned vocals, and questioned whether it was "a good enough song for Cher". Gaga said that she had written the song "a long time ago" but had never included it on one of her albums because it did not fit the concepts of those records, despite considering it a "big, massive, beautiful hit record". She said that Cher later heard the song, loved it and wanted to record it with her.

== Recording and composition ==
RedOne, who had worked extensively with Lady Gaga on her debut album The Fame, produced "The Greatest Thing".

"The Greatest Thing" was written by Lady Gaga and RedOne, the latter of whom also produced the song. RedOne explained the song's development in an interview with MTV News. He and Gaga had recorded "The Greatest Thing" several years earlier but had not done anything with the track. After RedOne's management arranged a meeting with Cher's management, he played Cher several songs, including "The Greatest Thing"; she liked it and told him, "This is my song." RedOne subsequently informed Gaga, who he said was enthusiastic about Cher recording it. Cher recorded her vocals first, and about a month later Gaga contacted RedOne about appearing on a remix. He instead encouraged her to join the original recording and "make it a duet". After Cher agreed, RedOne recalled that "it became a party".

RedOne described the song as emotional and uplifting while incorporating a dance-oriented sound. He said that it could be performed with different forms of accompaniment, including guitar and piano, and characterized it as a song that could also be performed a cappella.

The leaked track is 1980s- and 1990s-influenced dance-pop. Cher performs the first verse and leads the opening chorus, while Gaga sings the second verse. Radio.com described the arrangement as featuring a piano line and synthesized harps over a dance beat, with distorted vocal effects in the background. Philadelphia magazine called it an "anthemic, uplifting number", noting Cher's processed vocals and Gaga's background vocals.

== Planned release and cancellation ==
"The Greatest Thing" was initially intended for Cher's forthcoming studio album, Closer to the Truth (2013). In August 2011, Billboard reported that the song was expected to be released in September as the album's lead single. The song remained part of the project into 2012; that July, Cher praised Gaga's vocals as "amazing" and said that vocal producer Kuk Harrell, who was working on the album, had reacted enthusiastically after hearing "The Greatest Thing" for the first time. However, on June 11, 2013, responding to a fan who asked about the song on Twitter, Cher said that the recording had been completed but Gaga did not like it and did not want it released. She expressed disappointment but added that, as an artist, the decision was Gaga's. A week later, in a live stream interview, Cher called the song "brilliant" and praised Gaga's performance, while reiterating that Gaga did not like the recording.

Cher subsequently said that she had rerecorded her own vocals, which she had previously disliked, while praising Gaga's performance on the song. She explained that RedOne had been expected to redo the track but had not done so, and said that other singers liked the song but considered its production outdated. According to Cher, RedOne's contract prevented anyone else from altering the track, leaving the production unable to be revised. In a later interview, Cher similarly said that the music needed updating because the recording had been made two years earlier. She also felt that she and Gaga should have worked on the recording together in the same room and that further work might have produced a version they were both satisfied with. Gaga addressed the cancellation in September 2013 during an appearance on Watch What Happens Live. She said that because of her love for Cher, she wanted any duet they released together to be "special" and wanted the two of them to work on it together.

== Leak and reception ==
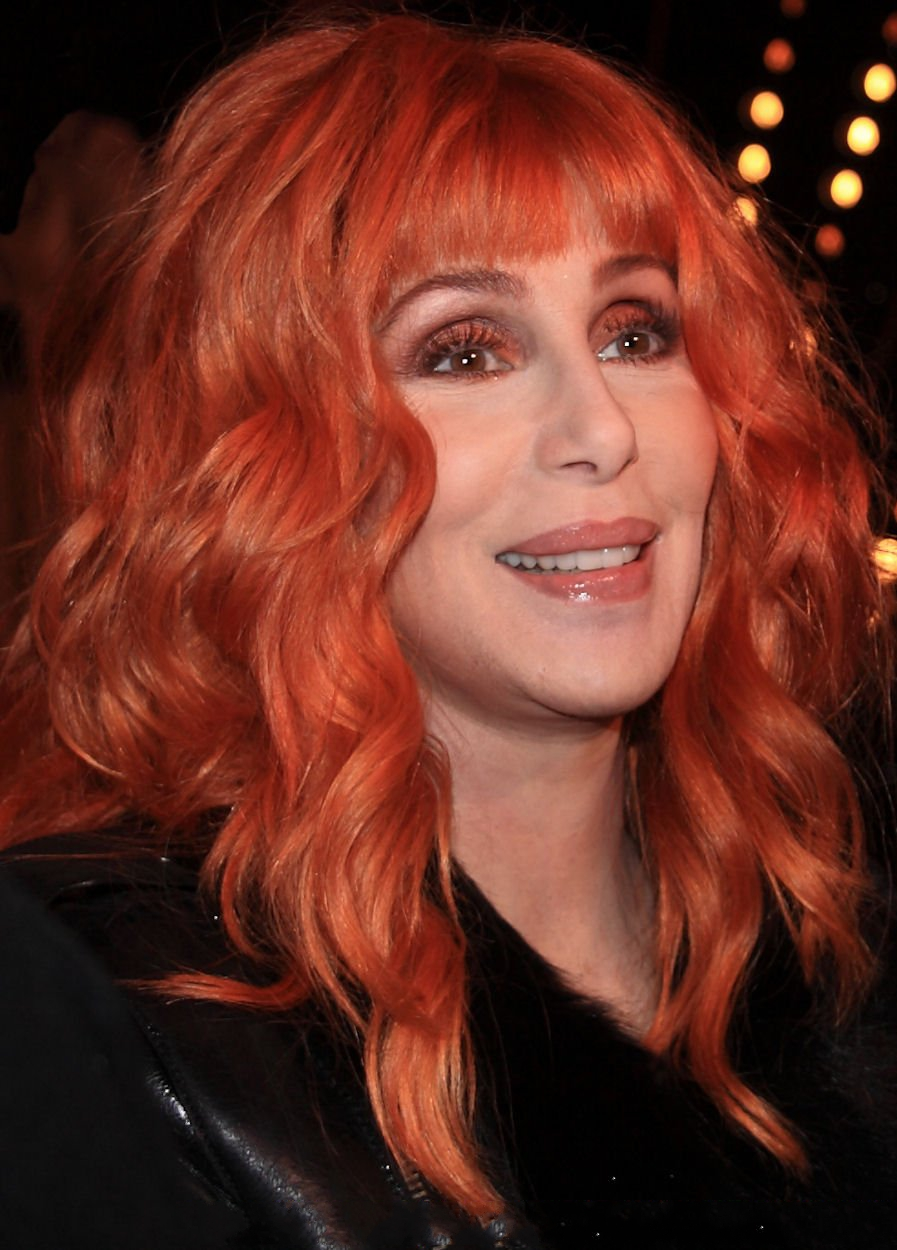
After "The Greatest Thing" was withheld from release because Lady Gaga (left) was dissatisfied with the recording, Cher (right) later criticized the leaked track, saying it was not the version she had expected to be released.

An unfinished recording of "The Greatest Thing" leaked online on August 13, 2013, shortly before the release of Closer to the Truth. Cher strongly objected to the leak, saying that it was not the recording intended for release and expressing frustration that unfinished material had been made public. She said that she had possessed the correct recording for more than a year and rejected suggestions that she might have leaked the song herself, citing her respect for Gaga. Cher later said that she had never previously heard the leaked recording and criticized the person responsible for releasing the wrong version.

John Boone of E! News described the track as "campy" and compared its sound to "an anime theme song" played in a gay bar during a drag show after travelling back to the 1980s or 1990s. Reviewing Closer to the Truth, Michael Callahan of Philadelphia magazine considered "The Greatest Thing" stronger than much of the album's material. He praised the song's hook and the vocals of Cher and Gaga, and credited RedOne with its production. Callahan also compared the song's sound to that of a Disney princess anthem. Kia Makarechi of HuffPost compared the track to a glittery outtake from a Disney film soundtrack, specifically A Goofy Movie, and said that the comparison was not necessarily negative. Mandy Tamm of Rolling Stone Germany found the song strongly reminiscent of Schlager music and compared its sound to the soundtrack of a romantic comedy starring Cher.

Callie Beusman of Jezebel gave "The Greatest Thing" a negative review, describing it as "awful-sounding" and comparing it to "a DDR version of an Old Navy commercial". Jenesaispop wrote that after hearing the leaked recording, there were "millions of reasons" to keep it from public knowledge.
