= Woman's World (Cher song) =

Single by Cher

from the album Closer to the Truth
- Released: June 18, 2013
- Studio: Henson Recording Studios (Los Angeles, CA); Stamford Bridge Studios (London, England); Vine Street Music Studios (Burbank, CA)
- Length: 3:42
- Label: Warner Bros.
- Songwriters: Matt Morris; Paul Oakenfold; Anthony "TC" Crawford; Joshua "JD" Walker
- Producer: Paul Oakenfold

Cher singles chronology
"You Haven't Seen the Last of Me" (2010)	"Woman's World" (2013)	"I Hope You Find It" (2013)

Music video
- "Woman's World" on YouTube

"Woman's World" is a song by American singer Cher, from her twenty-fifth studio album Closer to the Truth (2013). It was written by Matt Morris, Anthony "TC" Crawford, Joshua "JD" Walker, and Paul Oakenfold, while production was helmed by the latter. Sonically, "Woman's World" is a dance-pop, EDM, electropop and electro song with themes of women's empowerment in its lyrics. The song was released by Warner Bros. Records on June 18, 2013 as the album's lead single.

The song became a top thirty hit in Switzerland. In the United States, it was a modest hit on the Billboard's top-selling electronic dance music chart, becoming Cher's eighth number-one single on the Hot Dance Club Songs chart, after being the greatest-gainer for its fourth, consecutive week. On the Adult Contemporary chart, "Woman's World" debuted at number 30, making Cher one of few artists to have appeared on that chart in every one of the last six decades.

== Background and release ==
After a nearly ten-year break, Cher resumed her recording career when she starred in the 2010 musical film Burlesque. Cher recorded two tracks, "Welcome to Burlesque" and "You Haven't Seen the Last of Me", for the film's soundtrack album which was issued in November 2010. The soundtrack was met with positive reviews, with critics praising her return to music. In early 2011, Cher began work on her twenty-fifth studio album.

While Cher was still in the process of finishing the album, snippets of "Woman's World" surfaced online in late October 2012, and when a DJ played a demo of the song at a Michigan club, Cher revealed on her Twitter page that she was upset about the leak. Once a full-length, unfinished version of the song began to spread online, Warner Bros. and Cher decided to give the single an early release. Cher explained, "We thought we had time, but ('Woman's World') started popping all over the world!"

On November 22, 2012, "Woman's World" was streamed on Cher's official website as a Thanksgiving treat for her fans. The song was not commercially released and was only available to stream on media sites such as YouTube and SoundCloud. After angrily tweeting a fan about her forthcoming album's delay, Cher admitted that the single's release was pushed back to June 2013, with the album following in September. On June 10, Cher revealed on her Facebook page that the official date of the single's release is June 18, with the premiere at the season finale of the talent show The Voice. Shortly after, a lyric video was posted on Cher's YouTube channel and the single appeared for purchase and streaming on iTunes, Amazon.com and Spotify.

On August 30, 2013 "Woman's World" was released in France and Australia and on September 2, 2013, in most other European countries.

== Composition ==
"Woman's World" (2013)
"Woman's World" is a feminist anthem that draws influences from house and Europop music.

"Woman's World" is an uptempo, "thumping" "empowerment jam" which falls under the dance-pop, EDM, electropop, and electro genres. The song lyrically and sonically matches her previous hits, "Believe" and "Strong Enough". Bass drums serve as the song's prologue, preparing a trance-like atmosphere, where Cher sings in a soft, low tone of voice: "I'm dancin' solo, in the dark on the club floor/ I need to let it go, shake it off, stop thinkin' 'bout you'," before emerging with a powerful vocal delivery with the words: "Torn up, busted, taken apart/ I've been broken down, left with a broken heart/ But I'm stronger, strong enough to rise above." In the refrain, Cher belts "tell the truth / this is a woman's world" in her contralto. The lyrics revolve around the theme of overcoming a broken relationship by surrendering to a discothèque environment. Toward the middle of the song, Cher addresses the listeners directly with: "All the women in the world, stand up, come together now/ This is a woman's world/ Everybody in the club, stand up, come together now" before returning to the hook and 808 drums. Cher's vocals span over one and a half octaves, from a low note of F_{3} to the high note of D_{5}.

== Promotion and performances ==
To promote the single and the accompanying album, Cher performed "Woman's World" on the season finale for the American vocal competition, The Voice on June 18, 2013. Gearing for the performance, the singer used the hashtag trending topic #CherLiveStream on microblogging website, Twitter, to advertise a behind-the-scenes Q & A between herself and fans. Following the chat, "Woman's World" was digitally released in Canada and the United States on the iTunes and Amazon platforms. The single was available for immediate download, along with a pre-order of Closer to the Truth. The first 500 purchasers would receive their copy of the album with Cher's signature on it. The single appeared on Spotify and three remixes as well as an official lyrics video were uploaded to Cher's YouTube channel. The remixes were executed by Tracy Young, Danny Verde, and R3hab. Cher announced August 19, 2013 through her Twitter account that the "Woman's World"'s music video would premiere on August 20, 2013. Filming for it began as early as January 2013, when the track initially leaked. As a service to fans, the Cher Charitable Foundation opened an eBay auction, selling walk-on roles for the music video. Proceeds were donated to GlobalGiving. The winning bid grossed $5,700 in American currency.

On June 30, 2013, Cher performed "Woman's World" along with her hit singles "Strong Enough" and "Believe" as the headline act of NYC Pride's annual Dance on the Pier, after having visited several New York City radio stations and night clubs as well as Andy Cohen's late night talk show Watch What Happens Live since June 27. She also performed the song at the 35th annual Macy's 4th of July Fireworks, which was broadcast live on NBC. Furthermore, she sang "Woman's World", "I Hope You Find It" and "Believe" during her Today Show concert on September 23, 2013, in order to promote the album. It also served the opening song of her 2014 Dressed to Kill Tour, 2017-2020 Las Vegas residency, Classic Cher, and 2018–2020 Here We Go Again Tour sung standing atop a pillar midair wearing a feather headpiece. For Classic Cher & Here We Go Again Tour, the shorter version of the song is used.

== Critical reception ==
"Woman's World" has received generally positive reviews by most music journalists. Young Tan of So So Gay gave the single 5 stars out of 5, saying it was reminiscent of her biggest hits such as "Believe" and "Strong Enough" and that her "vocals are still in fine form," as well as adding that Cher's gay male fans would enjoy the track the most. Malene Arpe from The Toronto Star considered the song "kinda great," "kinda awesome and kick-ass and pure Cher." Gregory Ellwood of HitFix called it "a catchy track that will certainly make her fans happy and could get some gay club play." He gave the song a B+ and stated that he was "just thrilled she can still belt it out like the youngsters out there." Keith Cauldfield from Billboard called it a "thumping dance single."

However, Michael Cragg from The Guardian gave it a more mixed review, stating "Woman's World aims squarely for the EDM jugular but manages to sound horrendously dated, which might not be all that surprising given it was produced by Paul Oakenfold." He compared it to the "cheap" and "cheerless" songs on Alexandra Burke's album Heartbreak on Hold but stated that Cher's vocals were "engaged." Sarah Dean from The Huffington Post labelled it a "dancefloor anthem" and said her "instantly recognisable voice is loud and clear, but does the electro music do enough to bring her sound into this decade?" Dean compared the song's feminist theme to Beyoncé's "Run the World (Girls)."

Popular music journalist Mike Wass praised the cover art for Cher's dance single, saying, "Cher raises the bar for elegance and glamour with an exquisite image, photoshopped to the brink of animation. The pop legend wears an understated — by her standards — headdress and coyly looks at the camera like the 18-year-old ingenue she still is at heart."

== Chart performance ==
The song became a top thirty hit in Switzerland. In the United States, it was a modest hit on the Billboard's top-selling electronic dance music chart, becoming Cher's eighth number-one single on the Hot Dance Club Songs chart, after being the greatest-gainer for its fourth, consecutive week. On the Adult Contemporary chart, "Woman's World" debuted at number 30, making Cher one of few artists to have appeared on that chart in every one of the last six decades.

== Music video ==
The official music video for "Woman's World", directed by Ray Kay, debuted on August 21 on Cher's official YouTube channel. The video features Cher in several outfits, wearing wild and flamboyant wigs, one of the wigs made of newspaper cuttings. Cher is joined by a variety of women of different races, ages and appearances in the female empowerment track. The video uses split screens appear to give Cher different women's bodies and outfits. The videoclip was inspired by The Ones' "Face and Body".

== Track listing ==
Digital and streaming release
No.	Title	Writer(s)	Producer(s)	Length
1.	"Woman's World"	Matt Morris; Paul Oakenfold; Anthony "TC" Crawford; Joshua "JD" Walker	Oakenfold; Crawford^{[a]}; Walker^{[a]}; Jeff Fenster^{[a]}	3:42

CD single
No.	Title	Writer(s)	Producer(s)	Length
1.	"I Hope You Find It"	Steve Robson; Jeffrey Steele	Mark Taylor	3:46
2.	"Woman's World"	Morris; Oakenfold; Crawford; Walker	Oakenfold; Crawford^{[a]}; Walker^{[a]}; Jeff Fenster^{[a]}	3:42

Notes

- ^{^a} signifies an additional producer

== Credits and personnel ==
Credits are taken from the liner notes of Closer to the Truth.

Studios

- Henson Studios (Los Angeles, California)
- Stamford Bridge Studios (London, United Kingdom)
- Vine Street Music Studios (Burbank, California)

Personnel

- Josie Aiello – background vocalist
- Anthony "TC" Crawford – additional producer, writer
- Jeff Fenster – additional producer
- Serban Ghenea – mixing engineer
- Josh Godwin – vocal producer
- John Hanes – mixing engineer
- Kuk Harrell – background vocalist, vocal producer
- Matt Morris – background vocalist, writer
- Paul Oakenfold – producer, writer
- Jeanette Olsson – background vocalist
- Chris "Tek" O'Ryan – additional engineering
- Joshua "JD" Walker – additional producer, writer

== Charts ==
=== Weekly charts ===
Weekly chart performance for "Woman's World"
Chart (2013–2014)	Peak position
Australia (ARIA)	77
Austria (Ö3 Austria Top 40)	60
Belgium (Ultratip Bubbling Under Flanders)	87
Belgium (Ultratip Bubbling Under Wallonia)	38
Italy (FIMI)	93
Germany (GfK)	66
Scottish Singles Sales (Official Charts)	93
Switzerland (Schweizer Hitparade)	26
Ukraine Airplay (TopHit)	182
US Bubbling Under Hot 100 Singles (Billboard)	25
US Hot Dance Club Songs (Billboard)	1
US Hot Dance/Electronic Songs (Billboard)	16
US Adult Contemporary (Billboard)	28
Venezuela Pop Rock General (Record Report)	9
Venezuela Top 100 (Record Report)	98

=== Year-end charts ===
Year-end chart performance for "Woman's World"
Chart (2013)	Position
US Hot Dance Club Songs (Billboard)	46
US Hot Dance/Electronic Songs (Billboard)	58

== See also ==
- List of Billboard number-one dance songs of 2013
