= You Haven't Seen the Last of Me =

Single by Cher

from the album Burlesque: Original Motion Picture Soundtrack
- Released: November 24, 2010
- Recorded: 2009
- Studio: Emblem Music (Calabasas, CA)
- Length: 3:30
- Label: RCA; Warner Bros.
- Songwriter: Diane Warren
- Producers: Matt Serletic; Mark Taylor

Cher singles chronology
"Bewitched, Bothered and Bewildered" (2003)	"You Haven't Seen the Last of Me" (2010)	"Woman's World" (2013)

Licensed audio
- "You Haven't Seen the Last of Me (Burlesque Original Motion Picture Soundtrack)" on YouTube

"You Haven't Seen the Last of Me" is a song recorded by American singer-actress Cher for the soundtrack to her film Burlesque (2010), released by RCA Records. Written by Diane Warren and produced by Matt Serletic and Mark Taylor, "You Haven't Seen the Last of Me" is a power ballad. Cher's record label, Warner Bros. Records, released a remix extended play featuring uptempo dance versions of the song on the iTunes Store on November 24, 2010. In the United States, RCA serviced the song to adult contemporary radio on January 15, 2011.

Upon its release, the single was well-received from most contemporary music critics, who praised Cher's comeback as well as the track's composition. It garnered Warren a Golden Globe Award for Best Original Song at the 68th Golden Globe Awards (2011), and was nominated for Best Song Written for Visual Media at the 54th Grammy Awards. On January 20, 2011, the track peaked at number one on the Billboard Hot Dance Club Songs chart, making Cher the only musical act to have a number-one single on a Billboard chart in each of the last six decades. Since its release, "You Haven't Seen the Last of Me" has been covered by James Franco and others.

== Background and release ==
After a seven-year break from acting, Cher returned to film in 2010 musical Burlesque, co-starring Christina Aguilera. It marked her first screen appearance since Stuck on You (2003). Reflecting on the production, she said, "It's harder to do things [at 66]. I've beat my body up so badly, it's amazing it's still talking to me and listening to what I say. But I've got aches and pains everywhere."

RCA Records issued the film's soundtrack on November 19, 2010. Aguilera performed eight tracks and Cher performed two, "Welcome to Burlesque" and "You Haven't Seen the Last of Me". Cher said the latter carried personal weight for her, adding, "That song, for me, had a lot of meaning. It reminded me that I have to kind of move over." She told the Fresno Bee, "Not that I'm doing it gracefully, because you'd have to pull me over kicking and screaming."

On November 24, 2010, Cher's label Warner Bros. Records released a remix extended play on the iTunes Store with uptempo dance versions by Almighty, Dave Audé, and StoneBridge. Warner followed with a standalone digital single of the StoneBridge remix on December 7, 2010. RCA serviced the song to American adult contemporary radio on January 15, 2011. It later appeared on the deluxe edition of Cher's 25th studio album, Closer to the Truth (2013).

"You Haven't Seen the Last of Me" was covered by American actor James Franco during his co-hosting appearance at the 83rd Academy Awards on February 27, 2011. Writing for Hitfix, Gregory Ellwood called the cover "a great listen".

== Composition and reception ==
"You Haven't Seen the Last of Me"
"You Haven't Seen the Last of Me" is a power ballad which was written by Diane Warren. It garnered critical acclaim from contemporary music critics and earned Warren a Golden Globe Award for Best Original Song in 2011.

Written by Diane Warren, "You Haven't Seen the Last of Me" is a power ballad which lasts for a duration of 3:30 (three minutes and thirty seconds). Composed in the key of F minor, it has a larghetto tempo of 62,5 beats per minute. Cher's vocals on the track span from the low-note of Ab_{3} to the high-note of D_{5}.

Upon its release, critical response to "You Haven't Seen the Last of Me" was favorable. Jim Farber for the New York Daily News praised the track, calling it "a show-stopper with the tailor-made" and "takes nothing away from the sweep of the tune – or from the star's to-the-rafters performance". Bill Lamp for About.com gave it a positive review, labeling it "a mega power ballad". Frank Bruni for The New York Times commented that the song "proclaims that she's "far from over". Tina Mrazik for Associated Content labelled it "ultimate", while Ann Hornaday for The Washington Post picked "You Haven't Seen the Last of Me" as well as "Bound to You" as the two power ballads that "[land] with such powerful force". Alissa LeClair for the website Movie Buzzers called the song "Cher's peak" throughout the movie and said that it "conveys how important Cher is both on screen and on the music charts, transcending any previous doubts that Cher was no longer relevant in her sixty-fourth year". AFP of The Independent commented that the song "has particular poignancy at this moment in her career". At the 68th Golden Globe Awards (2011), "You Haven't Seen the Last of Me" earned Warren a Golden Globe Award for Best Original Song. It was also nominated for Best Song Written for Visual Media at the 54th Grammy Awards.

== Chart performance ==
On January 20, 2011, "You Haven't Seen the Last of Me" peaked at number one on the Hot Dance Club Songs chart. This made Cher the only act to have notched a number-one single on a Billboard chart in each of the last six decades. By the end of 2011, the single was the 33rd best-performing dance single in the United States, according to Billboard. On October 25, 2013, the song spent its first week in the Australian Singles Chart at number 91.

== Charts ==
=== Weekly charts ===
Chart (2010–13)	Peak position
Australia (ARIA)	91
CIS Airplay (TopHit) (Dave Aude Club Mix)	154
Global Dance Songs (Billboard)	31
Ukraine Airplay (TopHit) (Dave Aude Club Mix)	72
US Dance Club Songs (Billboard)	1

=== Year-end charts ===
Chart (2010)	Position
US Dance Club Songs (Billboard)	33

Chart (2011)	Position
Ukraine Airplay (TopHit)	175

== Release history ==
Country	Release date	Format	Label
Belgium	November 24, 2010	Digital remixes EP	Warner Bros. Records
Canada	November 24, 2010	Digital remixes EP	Warner Bros. Records
Denmark	November 24, 2010	Digital remixes EP	Warner Bros. Records
Finland	November 24, 2010	Digital remixes EP	Warner Bros. Records
France	November 24, 2010	Digital remixes EP	Warner Bros. Records
Germany	November 24, 2010	Digital remixes EP	Warner Bros. Records
Portugal	November 24, 2010	Digital remixes EP	Warner Bros. Records
Sweden	November 24, 2010	Digital remixes EP	Warner Bros. Records
Spain	November 24, 2010	Digital remixes EP	Warner Bros. Records
United States	November 24, 2010	Digital remixes EP	Warner Bros. Records
Belgium	December 7, 2010	Digital remix single	Warner Bros. Records
Germany	December 7, 2010	Digital remix single	Warner Bros. Records
Spain	December 7, 2010	Digital remix single	Warner Bros. Records
Norway	December 7, 2010	Digital remix single	Warner Bros. Records
United States	December 7, 2010	Digital remix single	Warner Bros. Records
United States	January 15, 2011	Adult contemporary radio	RCA Records

== See also ==
- List of number-one dance singles of 2011 (U.S.)
