= Outrageous (Cher album) =

Remix album by Cher
- Released: August 1989
- Recorded: 1964–79
- Genre: Folk, disco, pop
- Length: 32:40
- Label: PolyGram

Cher chronology
Heart of Stone (1989)	Outrageous (1989)	Mermaids (1990)

Outrageous is the first remix album by American singer-actress Cher, released in August 1989 by PolyGram. It was released initially in North America, and released the subsequent years in some European countries.

== Album information ==
Outrageous was released in August 1989. The CD contains remixes of all songs from the original album Prisoner. These remixes sometimes, are combined with songs from Cher albums "All I Really Want to Do", "The Sonny Side of Chèr" and "Chér". This compilation most prominently features Cher's 1965 hit debut single, "All I Really Want to Do". The rest of the album features Cher's overlooked and underrated hit singles from the 1960s. Among those overlooked hits are: "Where Do You Go", "Sunny" and "I Go to Sleep". Through the years these remixes have been re-released on various compilations, the titles differ from "Holdin' Out For Love" to "Lift Me Up, Sonny", "Boys and Girls" and many others.

Professional ratings
Review scores
Source	Rating
Allmusic	link

== Track listing ==
1. "All I Really Want to Do" (Bob Dylan) – 2:58
2. "I Go to Sleep" (Ray Davies) – 2:41
3. "Shoppin'" (Michele Aller, Bob Esty) – 5:50
4. "Boys and Girls" (Billy Falcon) – 3:40
5. "See See Rider" (Sonny Bono, Greene, Robert Stone) – 3:01
6. "Sunny" (Bobby Hebb) - 3:08
7. "Prisoner" (David Paich) – 6:20
8. "Holdin' Out for Love" (Tom Snow, Cynthia Weil) – 5:42
9. "Holy Smoke!" (Aller, Esty) – 5:50
10. "Come and Stay With Me" (Jackie DeShannon) – 2:48
11. "Where Do You Go" (Bono) - 3:16
12. "Hell on Wheels" (Aller, Esty) – 5:30
13. "Mirror Image" (Michael Brooks, Esty) – 5:30
14. "Outrageous" (Aller, Esty) – 5:15

== Production ==
- Tracks 3, 4, 9, 12, 14 - Ricks Music Inc. Aller Easty Music MV Intersong GmbH
- Track 7 - Hudmar Publishing Co Inc. Global MV
- Track 8 - Braintree Music Inc. Rondor MV
- Track 13 - Koppeiman-Bandier M. Jonathan Three M. Co EMI M. Publishing Germany GmbH J. Michel KG.
