= Vincent Simone =

Italian professional dancer (born 1979)

- Born: 15 March 1979 (age 47); Foggia, Italy
- Occupation: Professional dancer
- Known for: Strictly Come Dancing (2006–12)
- Spouse: Susan Duddy (m. 2015; div. 2018)
- Children: 2

Vincent Simone (born 15 March 1979) is an Italian professional dancer, who appeared on Strictly Come Dancing from 2006 until 2012. He moved to Guildford, Surrey, United Kingdom when he was 17. Simone and his professional partner Flavia Cacace, perform under the brand name Vincent and Flavia.

== Early life ==
Simone was born into a family of dancers; his parents are professional Latin and ballroom dancers.

== Personal life ==
Simone's partner is Susan Duddy, a former flight attendant. They have two children, born in 2009 and 2013. On 18 July 2015, Simone and Duddy wed at Castle Leslie in County Monaghan, Ireland. The wedding was initially misreported by Hello! Magazine, as occurring in Derry, Northern Ireland.

== Strictly Come Dancing ==
Highest and lowest scoring performances per dance

Dance	Partner	Highest	Partner	Lowest
American Smooth	Rachel Stevens	36	Natalie Cassidy	29
Argentine Tango	Rachel Stevens	39	Dani Harmer	38
Cha Cha Cha	Rachel Stevens	37	Edwina Currie	17
Foxtrot	Rachel Stevens	40	Edwina Currie	19
Jive	Louisa Lytton	36	Natalie Cassidy	30
Paso Doble	Louisa Lytton	34	Natalie Cassidy	28
Quickstep	Dani Harmer	36	Stephanie Beacham	24
Rumba	Rachel Stevens	39	Louisa Lytton	28
Salsa	Rachel Stevens	31	Felicity Kendal	26
Samba	Dani Harmer	36	Natalie Cassidy	26
Tango	Rachel Stevens	39	Natalie Cassidy	24
Viennese Waltz	Dani Harmer	34	Felicity Kendal	26
Waltz	Rachel Stevens	39	Dani Harmer	21
Showdance	Dani Harmer	35	-	-

Simone has appeared on the BBC's Strictly Come Dancing since the fourth series, where he danced with Louisa Lytton as his celebrity partner. They were knocked out in week 10, scoring 31 out of 40 for their first dance and 28 for the second. This gave them a total of 59 points, which left them in last place. Simone returned for the fifth series in 2007, partnering with actress Stephanie Beacham, but the pair were eliminated in the second week, losing to Letitia Dean and Darren Bennett in the dance off. One judge, Arlene Phillips, voted to save Beacham and Simone, but was outvoted by the other three judges.

After their success in the Strictly Live Tour! 2008, Simone and Lytton were chosen to take part in the Eurovision Dance Contest 2008 in September 2008. Dancing to '"Paint it Black" by Lee Mead, they were ranked ninth out of fourteen couples by a professional jury, and finished ninth overall when the results of the public vote had been added.

In the sixth series of Strictly Come Dancing, Simone partnered singer Rachel Stevens. On 22 November, they received the series' 1st perfect 40 for their Foxtrot. Despite having the series' highest average, they became the runners-up in the final, behind Tom Chambers and Camilla Dallerup.

Simone was partnered with actress Natalie Cassidy in the seventh series of the show. The couple were voted off on 28 November 2009, coming in fifth place.

In the eighth series in 2010, he partnered Felicity Kendal; they were voted off on 14 November, finishing in 8th place.

In September 2011, Simone returned as one of the male professional dancers in the ninth season. On the launch night of SCD, which was broadcast on 10 September, Simone was revealed to be the professional dance partner to former MP, author and broadcaster, Edwina Currie. However, the couple were eliminated first on 9 October 2011, and came in last place.

In 2012, Simone partnered Tracy Beaker actress, Dani Harmer. They reached the final and came fourth. Cacace won the series with her partner Louis Smith.

On 1 June 2013, Cacace announced that she and Simone would not be competing in Strictly Come Dancing that year so they could work on other shows.

Series	Partner	Place	Average Score
4	Louisa Lytton	4th	31.6
5	Stephanie Beacham	13th	24.0
6	Rachel Stevens	2nd	35.8
7	Natalie Cassidy	5th	28.2
8	Felicity Kendal	8th	27.1
9	Edwina Currie	14th	18.0
10	Dani Harmer	4th	32.7

=== Louisa Lytton ===
Week No.	Dance/Song	Judges' score					Result
Week No.	Dance/Song	Horwood	Phillips	Goodman	Tonioli	Total	Result
2	Quickstep / Don't Get Me Wrong	7	8	6	7	28	Safe
3	Jive / Smiley Faces	8	9	9	10	36	Safe
4	Foxtrot / Piece of My Heart	7	5	6	8	26	Safe
5	Salsa / Bailamos	6	8	7	8	29	Safe
6	Samba / Rhythm of the Night	8	8	8	8	32	Safe
7	Tango / Sweet Dreams (Are Made of This)	8	9	9	9	35	Safe
8	Paso Doble / Left Outside Alone	8	8	9	9	34	Safe
9	Viennese Waltz / That's Amore; Cha-Cha-Cha / Rescue Me	8; 9	8; 9	8; 9	9; 9	33; 36	Safe
10	American Smooth / Do Nothing Until You Hear From Me; Rumba / (Everything I Do) I Do It for You	7; 7	8; 7	8; 7	8; 7	31; 28	Eliminated
Live Tour in Birmingham	Argentine Tango / Por Una Cabeza Jive/Smiley Faces	9 10	10 10	10 10	-	29 30	2nd in overall tour

=== Stephanie Beacham ===
Week No.	Dance/Song	Judges' score					Result
Week No.	Dance/Song	Craig Revel Horwood	Arlene Phillips	Len Goodman	Bruno Tonioli	Total	Result
1	Group Swing Dance, Group Blues/Swing Dance/"It Don't Mean a Thing (If It Ain't Got That Swing)"/"I Just Want To Make Love To You"/"Grace Kelly"						Group Performance – Not Judged
2	Quickstep/"Suddenly I See"	6	6	6	6	24	Eliminated, chosen to be saved by Arlene Phillips

=== Rachel Stevens ===
Week No.	Dance/Song	Judges' score					Result
Week No.	Dance/Song	Craig Revel Horwood	Arlene Phillips	Len Goodman	Bruno Tonioli	Total	Result
2	Salsa/"No Puedes Comprar Mi Amor"	7	8	8	8	31	Safe
4	Quickstep/"Little Green Bag"	8	8	9	8	33	Safe
5	Samba/"Hips Don't Lie"	7	7	8	8	30	Safe
6	Viennese Waltz/"Everybody Hurts"	8	8	8	8	32	Safe
7	Jive/"Sweet Soul Music"	7	8	8	9	32	Safe
8	American Smooth/"I Got A Woman"	8	9	9	9	35	Bottom two
9	Rumba/"You Do Something to Me"	9	10	10	10	39	Safe
10	Foxtrot/"Close to You"	10	10	10	10	40	Safe
11	Waltz / "Angel"	9	10	10	10	39	Bottom two
11	Paso Doble / "The Final Countdown"	7	8	8	9	32	Bottom two
12	Tango / "Here Comes The Rain Again"	9	10	10	10	39	Safe
12	Cha-Cha-Cha / "Signed, Sealed, Delivered I'm Yours"	9	9	9	10	37	Safe
13	Argentine Tango / "When Doves Cry"	9	10	10	10	39	Safe
13	American Smooth / "Mandy"	9	9	8	10	36	Safe
14	Foxtrot / "Close to You	10	10	10	10	40	2nd place overall
14	Rumba / "You Do Something to Me"	9	10	10	10	39	2nd place overall
Showdance / "Flashdance... What a Feeling"	10	10	10	10			
Christmas Special 2009	Rumba/"Miss You Most (At Christmas Time)"	9	10	10	10	39	2nd

=== Natalie Cassidy ===
Week No.	Dance/Song	Judges' score					Result
Week No.	Dance/Song	Craig Revel Horwood	Len Goodman	Alesha Dixon	Bruno Tonioli	Total	Result
1	Group Mambo						Group Performance - Not Judged
2	Tango / Spider of the Night	6	6	6	6	24	Safe
2	Cha Cha Cha / "Bang Bang"	6	7	7	6	26	Safe
3	Paso Doble / "Malaguena"	6	7	8	7	28	Safe
4	Salsa / "You'll Be Mine (Party Time)"	7	8	7	7	29	Safe
5	Viennese Waltz / "At Last"	7	7	7	6	27	Safe
6	American Smooth / "Please Don't Talk About Me When I'm Gone"	7	8	7	7	29	Safe
7	Jive / "Good Golly Miss Molly"	7	8	7	8	30	Safe
8	Quickstep / "Tu Vuo' Fa L'Americano"	7	8	8	8	31	Safe
9	Foxtrot / "Magic Moments"	8	9	9	8	34	Safe
10	Samba / "Holiday"	6	7	8	5	26	Safe
11	Rock and Roll / "Long Tall Sally"	5	7	7	7	26	Eliminated

=== Felicity Kendal ===
Week No.	Dance/Song	Judges' score					Result
Week No.	Dance/Song	Craig Revel Horwood	Len Goodman	Alesha Dixon	Bruno Tonioli	Total	Result
1	Cha-Cha-Cha – “Sunny”	4	5	7	7	23	None
2	Foxtrot – “Somethin' Stupid”	6	6	6	7	25	Safe
3	Rumba – “True Colors”	7	7	8	7	29	Safe
4	Tango – “Czardas”	7	7	7	8	29	Safe
5	Viennese Waltz – "Waltz No. 2"	6	7	6	7	26	Bottom Two
6	Paso Doble – “Habanera”	6	8	7	8	29	Safe
7	Salsa – “All Night Long”	5	7	7	7	26	Bottom Two
8	American Smooth – “Me and My Shadow”	7	7	8	8	30	Eliminated

=== Edwina Currie ===
Week No.	Dance/Song	Judges' score					Result
Week No.	Dance/Song	Craig Revel Horwood	Len Goodman	Alesha Dixon	Bruno Tonioli	Total	Result
1	Cha-Cha-Cha – “Build Me Up Buttercup"	2	5	5	5	17	None
2	Foxtrot – "Buona Sera"	4	5	5	5	19	Eliminated

=== Dani Harmer ===
Week No.	Dance/Song	Judges' score					Result
Week No.	Dance/Song	Craig Revel Horwood	Darcey Bussell	Len Goodman	Bruno Tonioli	Total	Result
1	Waltz – “Open Arms"	5	5	6	5	21	None
2	Salsa – "Mama Do the Hump"	7	6	7	7	27	Safe
3	Foxtrot – "Over the Rainbow"	7	6	8	8	29	Safe
4	Cha Cha Cha – "Scooby-Doo"	6	6	8	7	27	Safe
5	Jive – "Dance with Me Tonight	8	8	9	8	33	Safe
6	Tango – "Rumour Has It"	8	8	9	9	34	Safe
7	Quickstep – "You Can't Hurry Love"	9	9	9	9	36	Safe
8	Samba – "Single Ladies (Put a Ring on It)"	9	9	9	9	36	Safe
9	Viennese Waltz – "That's Amore"	8	8	9	9	34	Safe
10	Quickstep/Charleston Fusion / "Happy Feet"	9	10	9	10	38	Safe
11	American Smooth / "Haven't Met You Yet"	8	8	9	9	34	Safe
11	Argentine Tango / "Libertango"	9	9	10	10	38	Safe
12	Tango / "Rumour Has It"	9	9	9	9	36	Eliminated
12	Showdance / "Bohemian Rhapsody"	8	9	9	9	35	Eliminated

=== I'm a Celebrity...Get Me Out of Here! ===
Simone competed in the thirteenth series of ITV's thirteenth series in 2013. He joined 'camp' on Day 5 with Annabel Giles and finished in tenth place, being the third celebrity to leave in a double elimination on Day 17, 3 December 2013.

== Titles ==
Career titles he and his partner Flavia Cacace have earned from competitions:

- UK Professional Ten Dance Champions 2002–2006
- UK Professional Showdance Champions 2003–2006
- Negracha club UK Argentine Tango Champions, 2006
- IDO World Argentine Tango Finalists, 2005/2006 (3rd place overall – winners, Show Tango section)
- UK Ballroom Champions
- World and European Ten Dance and Showdance finalists 2002–2006
