= Outrageous =

Outrageous may refer to:

- Outrageous!, a 1977 Canadian comedy film
- Outrageous (Cher album), a 1989 remix album
- "Outrageous" (song), a 2004 single by Britney Spears
- Outrageous (TV series), a 2025 British TV series
- Outrageous! (Alice in Videoland album)
- Outrageous (Kim Fowley album)
- "Outrageous", a song by Stephanie Mills from the 1984 album I've Got the Cure
