= Joey Essex =

English television personality (born 1990)

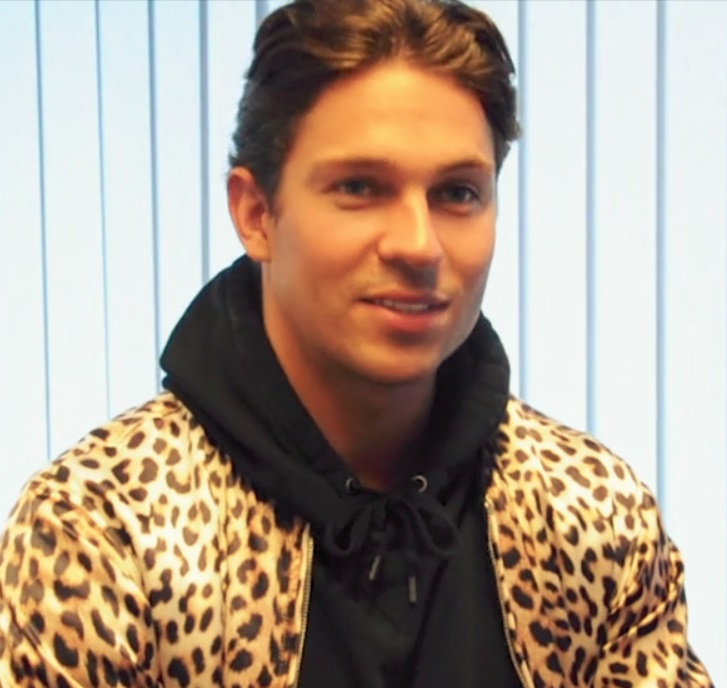
- Essex in 2017
- Born: Joey Don Essex; 29 July 1990 (age 36); Southwark, London, England
- Occupation: Television personality
- Years active: 2011–present

Joey Don Essex (born 29 July 1990) is an English television personality. He came to prominence for his appearances on the ITV reality series The Only Way is Essex (2011–2013). He went on to appear on various reality shows, including Splash! (2013), I'm a Celebrity...Get Me Out of Here! (2013), The Jump (2015), Celebs Go Dating (2016–2019, 2021), Celebrity Ex on the Beach (2020), Dancing on Ice (2023), and Love Island (2024).

== Education ==
Essex attended West Hatch High School in Chigwell, Essex. He left school in 2006, having received a U in Drama, a C in Art and a D in Design & Technology at GCSE. Ten years later, as part of a television series, he added a D in General Studies to his qualifications, commenting that "I still don't really know what GCSE stands for."

== Television career ==
Essex first appeared in The Only Way is Essex (TOWIE) as a supporting cast member in the second series with his cousin Chloe Sims but was then promoted to a main cast member in the third series. In 2011, the TOWIE cast recorded and released a single titled "Reem". In 2013, Essex competed in the first series of Splash! where he was eliminated during the "splash-off" in the second heat against television presenter Charlotte Jackson. On 13 November 2013, it was announced that Essex had quit The Only Way Is Essex. Essex also appeared in the thirteenth series of I'm a Celebrity...Get Me Out of Here!, and was voted out on 6 December 2013 after 20 days in the jungle, finishing in fourth place.

In March 2014, Essex starred in a one-off documentary called Educating Joey Essex, taking place in South Africa, narrated by Phillip Schofield. ITV2 later ordered a full series that began in June 2014. In 2016, ITV announced that the series has been picked up for a seven part second series; the series aired in the summer of that year with the first episode titled "The Queen's 90th Birthday". In 2015, Essex won the second series of Channel 4's reality show The Jump in 2015, and in 2016, Essex took part in the E4 reality dating series Celebs Go Dating. It was later confirmed that Essex would return to the show for its second series in 2017.

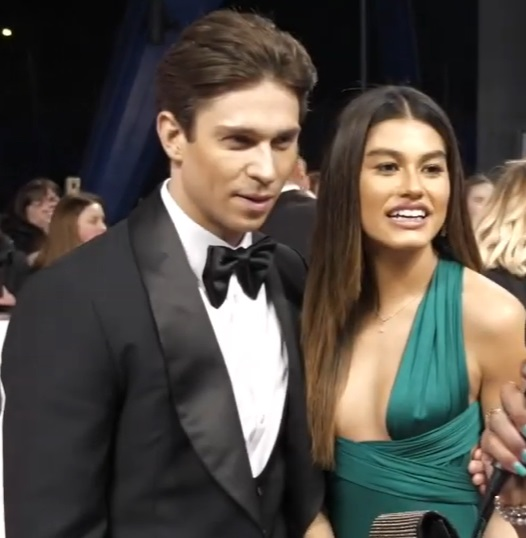
Essex (left) alongside Lorena Medina, whom he began dating on Celebrity Ex on the Beach at the National Television Awards in 2020

In 2017, he ranked in fourth place on the Essex Power 100 list, being named the fourth most powerful person in Essex. In 2018, Essex was a guest in the fourth series of BBC One's Michael McIntyre's Big Show. In 2020, Essex appeared on the second series of Celebrity SAS: Who Dares Wins, as well as MTV's Celebrity Ex on the Beach. In 2021, he appeared in the E4 series Celebs Go Dating: The Mansion.

In 2022, he participated in the eighth season of the Australian version of I'm a Celebrity...Get Me Out of Here!, entering the camp as an intruder in the second episode and finishing the show in sixth place. In 2023, Essex came second place on the fifteenth series of Dancing on Ice.

In June 2024, Essex entered the Love Island villa as a contestant on the eleventh series. He entered on the evening of Day 1 as the first "bombshell" of the series.

== Other ventures ==
=== Businesses ===
On 8 March 2013, Essex launched a hair products range, Joey Essex: D'Reem Hair. On 23 March 2013, he opened his shop Fusey in Brentwood. The shop closed in 2016. On 12 September 2013, Essex launched two fragrances, Fusey aftershave for men and My Girl perfume for women. In February 2016, Essex appeared in adverts for Batchelors Cup-a-Soup. In May 2017, it was announced that Essex would be launching a clothing line titled DAFDEA.

=== Boxing ===
In November 2024, Essex was set to make his MF–professional boxing debut but withdrew prior to the official announcement. On 18 July 2025, Essex officially announced his boxing debut, this time against Portuguese influencer Numeiro set to take place on 30 August at Manchester Arena in Manchester on the Misfits 22 – Ring of Thrones undercard.

In September 2026, Misfits Boxing announced that Essex would headline their event on 10 October at the Copper Box Arena in London against Dapper Laughs.

== Personal life ==
Essex was engaged to fellow TOWIE cast member Sam Faiers, but later split up. They reconciled later in 2012. He then proposed to Faiers again in March 2013 and she accepted. However, the couple split up again on-screen in June 2013 following several arguments between them. In October 2014, they announced they had split up "for good". In summer 2023, Essex was previously linked to model Grace Jackson before ending their romance but reuniting on Love Island in 2024.

In June 2012, Essex was mugged at knifepoint in Hammersmith, London.

Essex, whose mother took her own life aged 37 when he was ten years old, has been an ambassador for Child Bereavement UK since 2014. He addressed her suicide and his grief in the BBC Three documentary Joey Essex: Grief and Me broadcast on 3 June 2021.

In 2023, Essex moved to Dubai following his stint on Dancing on Ice, after thieves reportedly broke into his home in January 2023.

== Filmography ==
As himself
Year	Title	Notes
2011–2013	The Only Way Is Essex	109 episodes; series 2–10
2013	Splash!	Contestant; series 1
2013	I'm a Celebrity...Get Me Out of Here!	Contestant; series 13
2014–2016	Educating Joey Essex	Presenter
2015	The Jump	Contestant; series 2 (winner)
2016–2019	Celebs Go Dating	Participant (series 1–2); Online presenter (series 4–5)
2018	Five Star Hotel	Contestant
2019	Can I Improve My Memory?	Television special
2019	MTV Cribs UK	1 episode
2019	Celebrity MasterChef	Contestant
2020	Celebrity Ex on the Beach	Main cast
2020	Celebrity SAS: Who Dares Wins	Contestant
2021	Celebs Go Dating: The Mansion	Main cast
2021	Joey Essex: Grief and Me	Himself / presenter
2022	I'm a Celebrity...Get Me Out of Here! Australia	Contestant; season 8
2022	All Star Shore	Contestant; season 1
2023	Dancing on Ice	Contestant; series 15
2024	Love Island	Contestant; series 11
2026	The Box	Contestant; series 1

Guest appearances

- All Star Family Fortunes (25 December 2011) – Contestant (TOWIE vs Benidorm) – 1 episode
- The Xtra Factor (2011) – Guest
- 8 Out of 10 Cats (11 November 2011) – Panellist – 1 episode
- Daybreak (2011, 21 February 2013) – 2 episodes
- Loose Women (2011) – Guest – 1 episode
- This Morning (17, 31 August 15 December 2011, 30 November 2012, 21 February 15 July 12 December 2013, 28 October 2014) – Guest – 1 episode
- The Million Pound Drop Live (2012) – Contestant, with Sam Faiers
- Celebrity Juice (29 March & 27 September 2012, 11 April 2013, 15 May & 11 December 2014, 19 March & 22 October 2015, 5 May & 27 October 2016, 18 May & 26 October 2017, 3 May 1 November & 13 December 2018, 14 November 2019 and 16 & 23 April 2020) – Panellist –
- The Big Quiz (15 April 2012) – Panellist
- All Star Mr & Mrs (22 May 2013) – Contestant, with Sam Faiers
- Through the Keyhole (28 September 2013) – Celebrity homeowner – 1 episode
- Through the Keyhole (4 October 2014) – Panellist – 1 episode
- The Cube: Celebrity Special (11 April 2014) – Contestant
- Viral Tap (27 April 2014) – Guest
- Utterly Outrageous Frock Ups (2014) – Guest
- 8 Out of 10 Cats Does Countdown (12 September 2014) – Dictionary Corner
- Britain's Got More Talent (29 May 2015) – Panellist
- Celebrity Benchmark (26 September 2015) – Benchmarker
- Release the Hounds (31 October 2015) – Halloween Special – 1 episode
- The Crystal Maze (30 June 2017)
- CelebAbility (13 July 2017) – Contestant – 1 episode
- The Chase (11 November 2017) – Celebrity special
- Michael McIntyre's Big Show (1 December 2018) – Midnight Gameshow Guest
- Through the Keyhole (16 February 2019) – Celebrity homeowner
- Just Tattoo of Us (Series 5) - Guest host – 1 episode
- The Wheel (December 2020) – Celebrity expert on Dating
- Michael McIntyre's Big Show (27 January 2024) – Guest
- The Wheel (November 2025) – Celebrity expert on Dentistry

Selling sunset -season 8, 2 episodes

== Discography ==
=== Album ===
Title	Details
Joey Essex Presents Essex Anthems	Released: 17 March 2019; Format: Digital download

=== Singles ===
Single	Year	Peak chart positions	Album
Single	Year	UK	Album
"Reem"	2011	—	Non-album singles
"Last Christmas" (featuring cast of TOWIE series 3)	2011	33	Non-album singles
"—" denotes a recording that did not chart or was not released in that territory.

== MF–Professional boxing record ==
2 fights	1 win	0 losses
By decision	1	0
Draws	1	

No.	Result	Record	Opponent	Type	Round, time	Date	Location	Notes
2	Draw	1–0–1	Dapper Laughs	SD	4	10 Oct 2026	Copper Box Arena, London, England	
1	Win	1–0	Numeiro	MD	4	30 Aug 2025	Manchester Arena, Manchester, England	

== Bibliography ==
- Essex, Joey (2014). Being Reem (first ed.). London: Hodder & Stoughton. ISBN 978-1-444794-328.
