= Annabel Giles =

British television and radio presenter (1959–2023)

- Giles in 2016
- Born: Annabel Claire Giles; 20 May 1959; Pontypool, Wales
- Died: 20 November 2023 (aged 64); Hove, England
- Occupations: Presenter; actress; novelist; model
- Spouse: Midge Ure (m. 1985; div. 1989)
- Children: 2, including Molly Lorenne
- Website: Official website

Annabel Claire Giles (20 May 1959 – 20 November 2023) was a Welsh television and radio presenter. She also worked as a qualified counsellor, psychotherapist, model, actress, writer and novelist.

== Early life ==
Giles was born on 20 May 1959 in Griffithstown, near Pontypool, Monmouthshire, Wales, as the eldest of three sisters. She was expelled from boarding school at age 16 for going to see Steve Harley & Cockney Rebel play in Bristol, where she was seen smoking in the street.

== Career ==
Between 1977 and 1982, Giles trained and worked as a secretary, mostly employed in advertising agencies, which is where she was "discovered". Giles was then signed up by agency Models 1, and became the official model for Max Factor. While there she appeared in the 1981 music video for After the Fire's US hit version of Der Kommissar (song)

Giles started her media career in the 1980s on Razzmatazz and Night Network, and appeared in the 1993 film Riders. She came to prominence as co-presenter of ITV's Posh Frocks and New Trousers with Sarah Greene. She was in numerous entertainment shows, and a panellist on game shows ranging from Have I Got News for You to Shooting Stars. She was a regular panellist on Through the Keyhole and BBC Radio 4's Loose Ends and also appeared on BBC Radio 4's Just a Minute, and on Noel's House Party.

In 1995, Giles wrote and performed a one-woman show at the Edinburgh Festival called Looking for Mr. Giles, and a second show the following year, Anyone Can Be A TV Presenter.

Giles' first novel, Birthday Girls, reached number six in the top ten on the best-seller lists in 2001. She published Crossing the Paradise Line in 2003 and The Defrosting of Charlotte Small in 2006.

In November 2013, Giles entered the Australian jungle as a late arrival alongside Vincent Simone on the thirteenth series of I'm a Celebrity...Get Me Out of Here!. Giles was the first celebrity to leave the jungle, on 1 December.

From 2014, Giles regularly guested on the Channel 5 chat show The Wright Stuff hosted by Matthew Wright. In summer 2018 she appeared on ITV2's My Shirley Valentine Summer and was the resident agony aunt on the Eleri Siôn show for BBC Radio Wales.

After retraining, she worked as a counsellor and psychotherapist in Brighton and London. Giles was a patron of a charity for parents of children with special needs, Amaze Brighton.

== Personal life, illness and death ==
In 1985, Giles married the lead singer of Ultravox, Midge Ure. Their daughter, Molly Lorenne, was born in March 1987. Lorenne became the lead singer of pop punk group The Faders. Giles and Ure separated in 1989. Giles had a son who was born with XYY syndrome and Asperger syndrome; in 2011, having written a blog outlining the difficulties in educating a child with these issues, she received help from an anonymous benefactor towards his education.

Giles had ADHD. In July 2023, she was diagnosed with glioblastoma, an aggressive form of brain cancer, which had developed to stage IV. Her children issued a joint statement announcing that she had died on 20 November 2023, at Martlets Hospice in Hove, aged 64.
