= I'm a Celebrity...Get Me Out of Here! (British TV series) series 13 =

I'm a Celebrity...Get Me Out of Here!
- Series 13
- Presented by: Anthony McPartlin; Declan Donnelly
- No. of days: 22
- No. of castaways: 12
- Winner: Kian Egan
- Runner-up: David Emanuel
- No. of episodes: 20

Release
- Original network: ITV
- Original release: 17 November – 8 December 2013

Series chronology
- ← Previous; Series 12 Next → Series 14

I'm a Celebrity...Get Me Out of Here! returned for its thirteenth series on 17 November 2013 on ITV, and ended on 8 December 2013.

The show was confirmed to be returning to ITV at the end of the previous series. On 21 October 2013, two teasers were revealed for the new series, which were broadcast on air across the ITV network in the run up to the series' premiere.

Ant & Dec both returned as presenters of the show, whilst Joe Swash, Laura Whitmore and Rob Beckett returned to present the ITV2 spin-off show, I'm a Celebrity...Get Me Out of Here Now!. The final three were Kian Egan, who won, David Emanuel in second place and Lucy Pargeter in third place. With this victory, Kian Egan became the first celebrity born outside the United Kingdom to win the series, since Gino D'Acampo in 2009.

== Celebrities ==
The celebrity cast line-up for the thirteenth series was confirmed on 13 November 2013. On 21 November 2013, it was revealed that Annabel Giles and Vincent Simone would be the final two celebrities to enter the jungle.

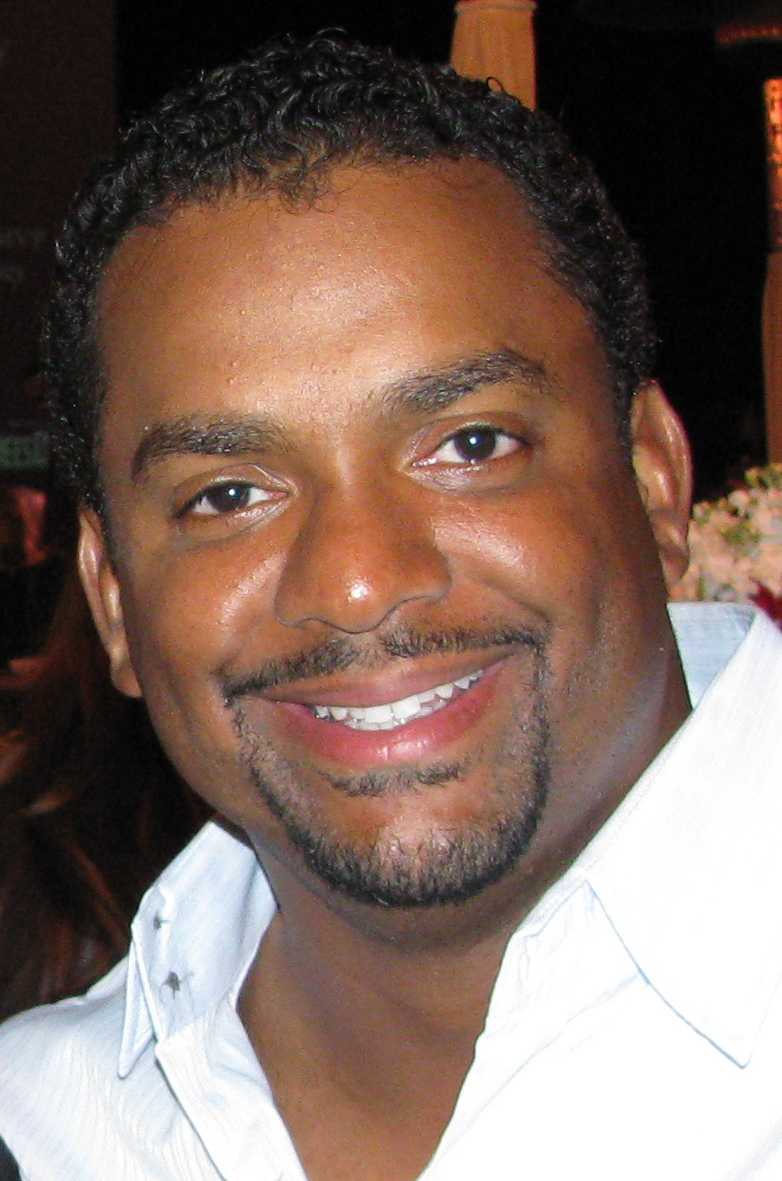
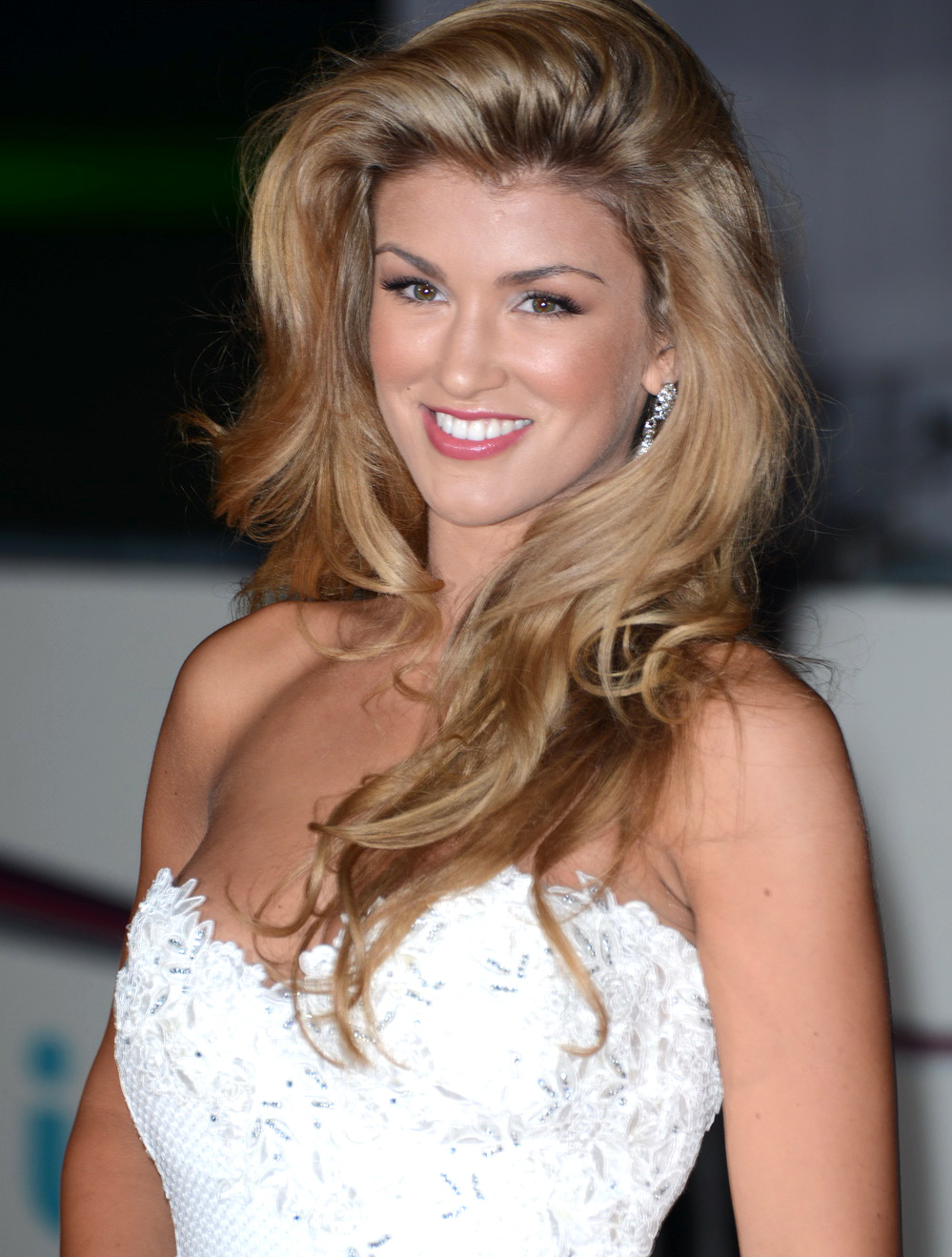
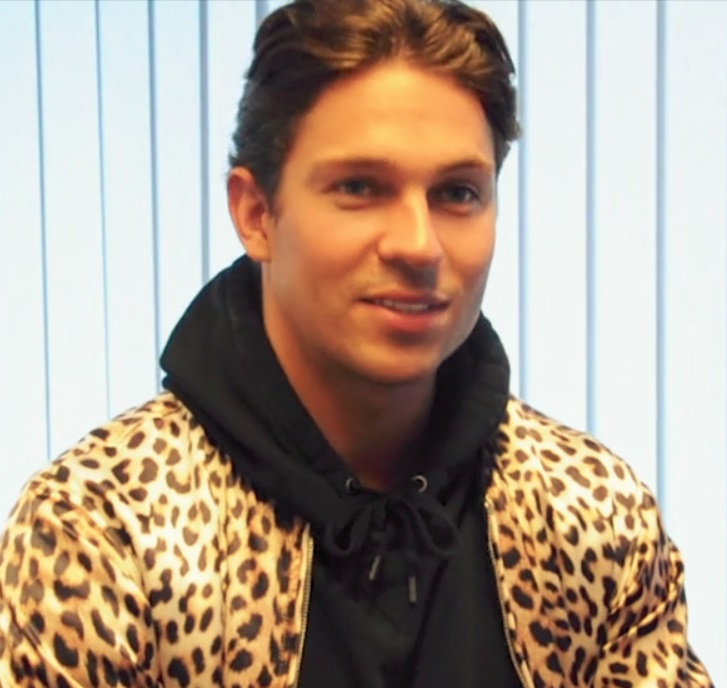
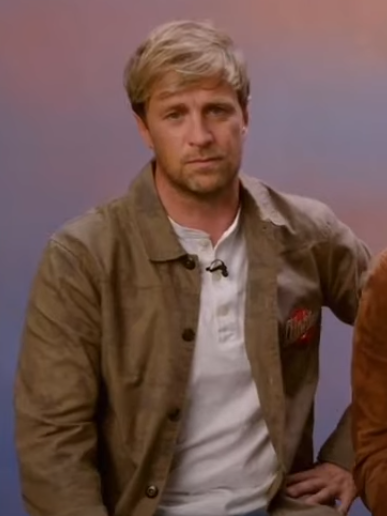
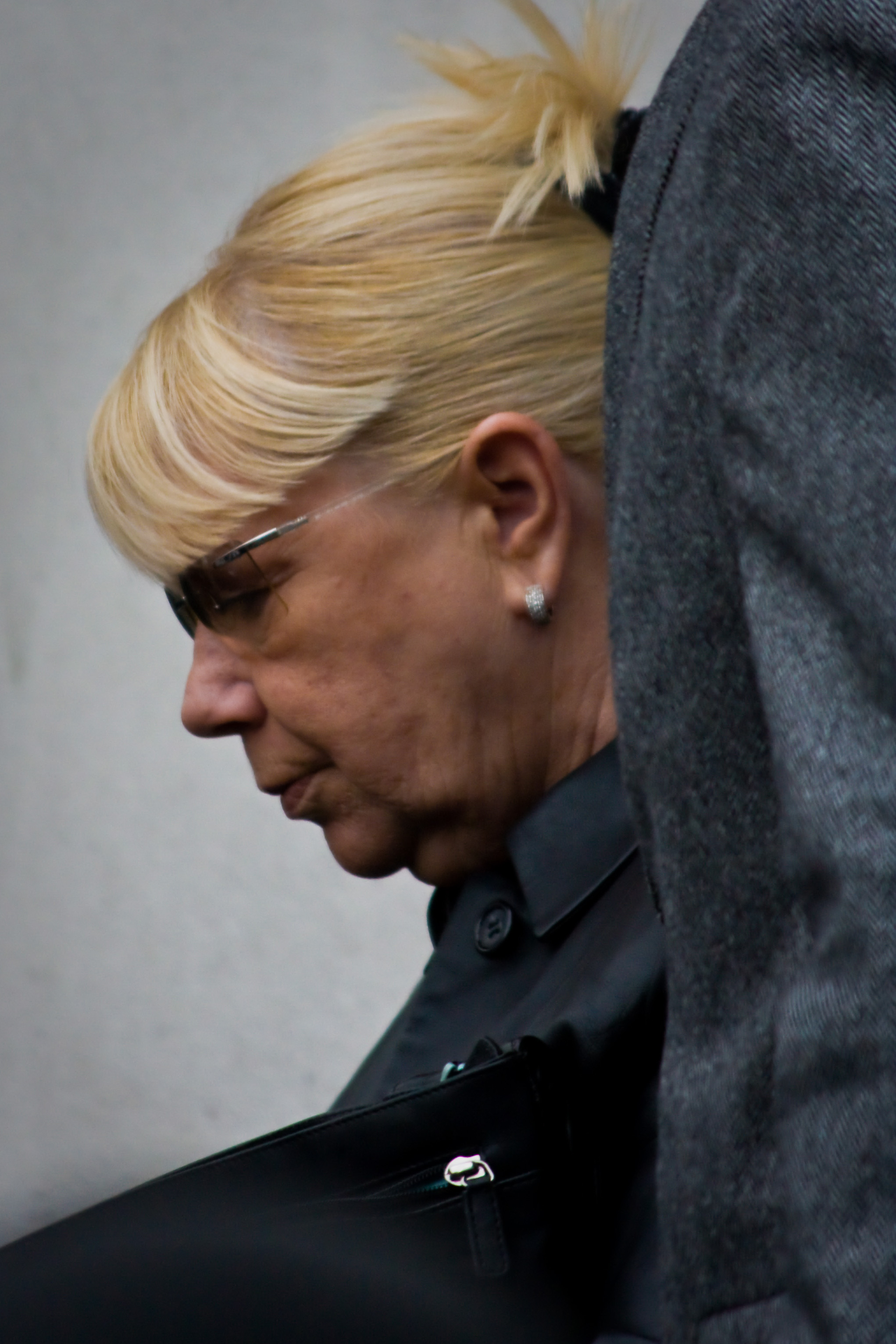
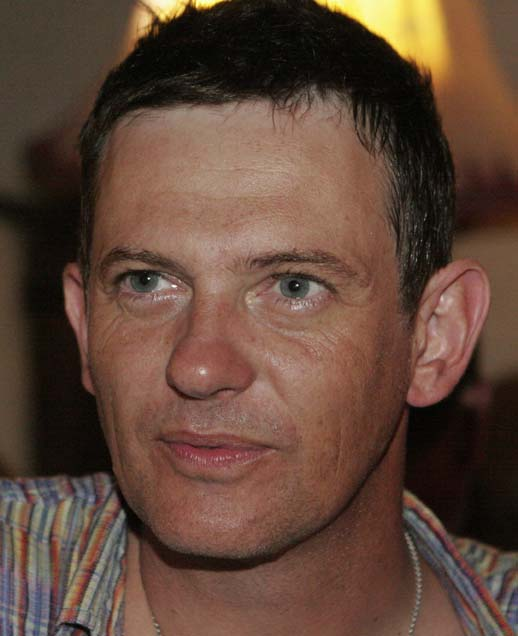
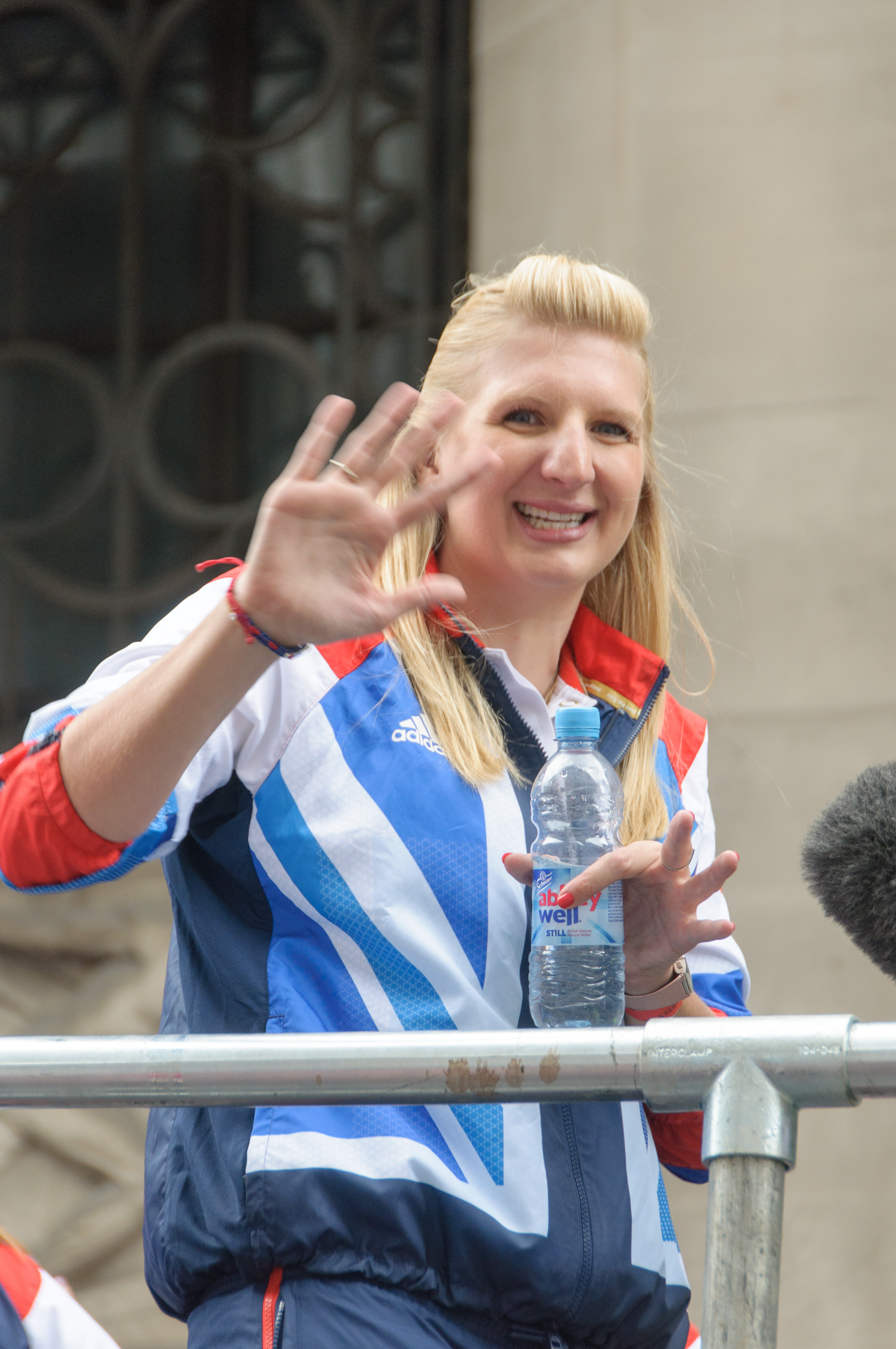
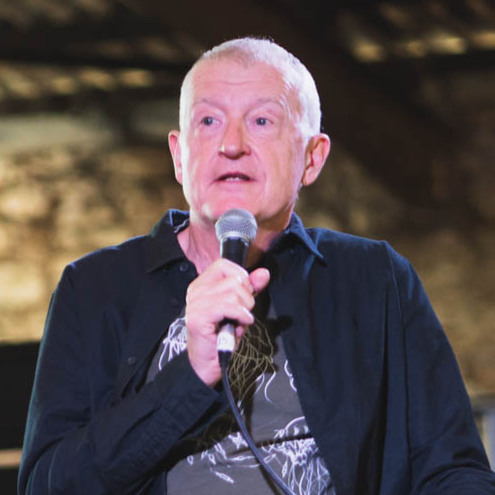
From left to right: Alfonso Ribeiro, Amy Willerton, Joey Essex, Kian Egan, Laila Morse, Matthew Wright, Rebecca Adlington, and Steve Davis.
Not pictured: Annabel Giles, David Emanuel, Lucy Pargeter, and Vincent Simone.

Celebrity	Known for	Status
Kian Egan	Westlife singer	Winner on 8 December 2013
David Emanuel	Royal fashion designer	Runner-up on 8 December 2013
Lucy Pargeter	Emmerdale actress	Eliminated 10th on 7 December 2013
Joey Essex	The Only Way Is Essex star	Eliminated 9th on 6 December 2013
Amy Willerton	Miss Universe Great Britain 2013	Eliminated 8th on 6 December 2013
Rebecca Adlington	Olympic freestyle swimmer	Eliminated 7th on 5 December 2013
Alfonso Ribeiro	The Fresh Prince of Bel-Air actor	Eliminated 6th on 5 December 2013
Steve Davis	Professional snooker player	Eliminated 5th on 4 December 2013
Matthew Wright	Journalist & television presenter	Eliminated 4th on 3 December 2013
Vincent Simone	Former Strictly Come Dancing professional	Eliminated 3rd on 3 December 2013
Laila Morse	EastEnders actress	Eliminated 2nd on 2 December 2013
Annabel Giles	Television presenter	Eliminated 1st on 1 December 2013

== Results and elimination ==
- Indicates that the celebrity was immune from the vote
- Indicates that the celebrity received the most votes from the public
- Indicates that the celebrity received the fewest votes and was eliminated immediately (no bottom two)
- Indicates that the celebrity was named as being in the bottom two
- Indicates that the celebrity received the second fewest votes and were not named in the bottom two

Daily results per celebrity
	Camp saviour		Day 15	Day 16	Day 17	Day 18	Day 19	Day 20	Day 21	Day 22 Final	Trials	Dingo Dollar challenges
	Day 12	Day 13	Day 15	Day 16	Day 17	Day 18	Day 19	Day 20	Day 21	Day 22 Final	Trials	Dingo Dollar challenges
Kian	1st 23.95%	—N/a	2nd 20.32%	2nd 17.90%	1st 22.03%	1st 25.83%	1st 26.77%	1st 42.28%	1st 57.04%	Winner; 67.44%	7	2
David	9th 5.38%	4th 12.27%	Immune	8th 5.00%	8th 6.05%	5th 9.67%	5th 11.97%	3rd 15.49%	2nd 26.90%	Runner-up; 32.56%	5	3
Lucy	3rd 9.95%	2nd 16.01%	4th 13.61%	3rd 14.37%	3rd 13.93%	3rd 14.74%	3rd 15.26%	2nd 19.36%	3rd 16.06%	Eliminated (Day 21)	5	2
Joey	2nd 20.89%	—N/a	3rd 18.17%	4th 13.61%	4th 13.60%	4th 13.33%	2nd 15.85%	4th 13.58%	Eliminated (Day 20)		8	2
Amy	4th 8.65%	1st 19.01%	1st 29.45%	1st 22.93%	2nd 16.88%	2nd 16.18%	4th 14.12%	5th 9.29%	Eliminated (Day 20)		5	1
Rebecca	5th 5.99%	6th 8.15%	Immune	5th 6.10%	6th 6.41%	6th 7.60%	6th 10.04%	Eliminated (Day 19)			2	1
Alfonso	10th 5.34%	7th 7.36%	6th 5.54%	9th 4.99%	6th 6.41%	7th 6.51%	7th 5.99%	Eliminated (Day 19)			3	1
Steve	7th 5.42%	5th 10.25%	5th 7.69%	7th 5.09%	5th 7.06%	8th 6.13%	Eliminated (Day 18)				3	2
Matthew	8th 5.40%	8th 6.00%	Immune	6th 5.64%	9th 4.87%	Eliminated (Day 17)					4	1
Vincent	11th 2.40%	9th 4.03%	Immune	10th 2.25%	10th 2.75%	Eliminated (Day 17)					1	2
Laila	6th 5.47%	3rd 15.16%	Immune	11th 2.13%	Eliminated (Day 16)						2	0
Annabel	12th 1.51%	10th 1.73%	7th 5.22%	Eliminated (Day 15)							2	1
Notes	1	2	3	None						4		
Bottom two (named in)	None		Alfonso, Annabel	Alfonso, Laila	Matthew, Vincent	Alfonso, Steve	Alfonso, Rebecca	Amy, Joey	None			
Eliminated	None		Annabel; 5.22% to save	Laila; 2.13% to save	Vincent; 2.75% to save	Steve; 6.13% to save	Alfonso; 5.99% to save	Amy; 9.29% to save	Lucy; 16.06% to save	David; 32.56% to win		
Eliminated	None		Annabel; 5.22% to save	Laila; 2.13% to save	Matthew; 4.87% to save	Steve; 6.13% to save	Rebecca; 10.04% to save	Joey; 13.58% to save	Lucy; 16.06% to save	Kian; 67.44% to win		

=== Notes ===
N.B. Bottom two is not a strict indication of the public vote as the celebrities are revealed in no particular order.
^1 The public were voting for who they wanted to become a camp saviour rather than who they wanted to save.
^2 Joey and Kian were exempt from this vote because they were already in 'Camp Saviour'.
^3 In order to win the final immunity token the eight celebrities who were not immune took part in a Bushtucker Trial called "Critter Crates". The first person to unlock all five padlocks by moving keys through a maze using a magnet would be given immunity, while the other seven faced the public vote.
^4 The public were voting for who they wanted to win, rather than to save.

== Bushtucker trials ==
The contestants take part in daily trials to earn food. These trials aim to test both physical and mental abilities. The winner is usually determined by the number of stars collected during the trial, with each star representing a meal earned by the winning contestant for their camp mates.

- The public voted for who they wanted to face the trial
- The contestants decided who did which trial
- The trial was compulsory and neither the public or celebrities decided who took part

Trial number	Air date	Name of trial	Celebrity participation	Public vote %	Winner/Number of stars	Notes
1	17 November	Turntable of Terror	David; Laila	—N/a	David	1
1	17 November	Turntable of Terror	Amy; Matthew	—N/a	Matthew	1
1	17 November	Turntable of Terror	Kian; Rebecca	—N/a	Kian	1
1	17 November	Turntable of Terror	Alfonso; Steve	—N/a	Alfonso	1
1	17 November	Turntable of Terror	Joey; Lucy	—N/a	Joey	1
2	18 November	Monday Night Takeaway	Matthew; Joey	66.46% 80.84%	Joey	2
3	20 November	Up to Your Neck in It	Matthew; Joey	44.05% 55.73%	Joey	2,3
4	21 November	Sub-Merged	Joey	19.51%	7/10 stars	None
5	22 November	Hang Glider from Hell	Amy	29.96%	7/10 stars	4
6	23 November	Critter Canteen	Annabel; Vincent	—N/a	Vincent	None
7	24 November	Cavern of Claws	Joey	14.30%	8/12 stars	None
8 (Live)	24 November	Critters Got Talent	Joey	15.62%	10/12 stars	3,5
9	27 November	In Cave Danger	Kian	17.96%	9/9 stars	6,7
10	28 November	Limo Scream	Lucy	27.22%	10/12 stars	None
11	29 November	Drown Under	Rebecca	—N/a	10/10 stars	8
12	30 November	As Scream on TV	David	—N/a	8/9 stars	9
13	1 December	Critter Crates	Alfonso; Amy; Annabel; Joey; Kian; Lucy; Matthew; Steve	—N/a	Matthew	10
14	2 December	Who Dares Wins Stars	Laila	—N/a	10/11 stars	None
15	3 December	Scares Rock	Steve	—N/a	3/10 stars	None
16	4 December	Plank of Peril	Alfonso; Kian	—N/a	8/8 stars	None
17	5 December	Surf and Turf	Amy	—N/a	6/7 stars	None
18	6 December	Celebrity Cyclone	Amy; David; Joey; Kian; Lucy	—N/a	5/5 stars	None
19	7 December	In a Spin	David; Kian; Lucy	—N/a	2/3 stars	None
20	8 December	Final Feast	David; Kian	—N/a	4/4 stars	None

=== Notes ===
^1 The celebrities were split up into two teams, Yellow (Lucy, Alfonso, Kian, Matthew and David) and Red (Steve, Joey, Rebecca, Amy and Laila). The Yellow team won meaning they moved into 'Croc Creek', the more luxurious of the two camps in the jungle. While the Reds, who lost the trial, moved into 'Snake Rock'.
^2 These trials both went to a tie breaker, resulting in Joey winning.
^3 Rebecca was excluded from this trial on medical grounds.
^4 Matthew and David were excluded from this trial on medical grounds.
^5 Joey had to pick someone to help him for parts of the trial; he chose Alfonso.
^6 Rebecca and Laila are excluded from this trial on medical grounds.
^7 Only 9 stars were on offer due to three of the celebrities (Kian, Steve and Laila) winning the 'Halfway Holiday' challenge and not being present in the camp that evening.
^8 Only 10 stars were on offer due to Kian & Joey being away on their 'Camp Saviour' challenge and not being present in camp that evening.
^9 Only 9 stars were on offer due to Kian, Joey and Amy being away on their 'Camp Saviour' challenge and not being present in camp that evening.
^10 As well as deciding who would win the final immunity token, it also decided how many meals the camp would get. Each celebrity was playing for 1 1/2 stars, but as only Matthew (who won) and Alfonso managed to escape their crates within the time the group only won 3 meals for camp.

== Star count ==
Celebrity	Number of Stars Earned	Percentage
Kian Egan	28/29 stars	97%
David Emanuel	19/21 stars	91%
Lucy Pargeter	17/20 stars	85%
Joey Essex	30/39 stars	77%
Amy Willerton	18/22 stars	82%
Rebecca Adlington	10/10 stars	100%
Alfonso Ribeiro	8/8 stars	100%
Steve Davis	3/10 stars	30%
Matthew Wright	—N/a	—N/a
Vincent Simone	—N/a	—N/a
Laila Morse	10/11 stars	91%
Annabel Giles	—N/a	—N/a

== Dingo Dollar challenges ==
Two members from camp will take part in the challenge to win the 'Dingo Dollars'. If they win them then they can then take the dollars to the 'Outback Shack', where they can exchange them for camp luxuries with Kiosk Keith. Two options are given and the celebrities can choose which they would like to win. However, to win their luxury, a question is asked to the celebrities still in camp via the telephone box. If the question is answered correctly, the celebrities can take the items back to camp. If wrong, they receive nothing.

- The celebrities got the question correct
- The celebrities got the question wrong

Episode	Air Date	Celebrities	Prizes available	Prize chosen
4	21 November	David; Steve	Cheese and biscuits Marshmallows	Marshmallows
5	22 November	Kian; Matthew	Popcorn; Crisps	Crisps
10	28 November	Annabel; Vincent	Tea bags Chocolate biscuits	Chocolate biscuits
13	1 December	Lucy; Steve	Baked beans Digestive biscuits	Digestive biscuits
14	2 December	Kian; Vincent	Salt and pepper Crumpets	Crumpets
15	3 December	Joey; Rebecca	Chocolate brownies Coffee	Chocolate brownies
16	4 December	David; Lucy	Twiglets; Jelly	Twiglets
17	5 December	Alfonso; Joey	Ice lollies Hot chocolate	Hot Chocolate
18	6 December	Amy; David	Bread, butter and jam Chocolate chip cookies	Bread, butter and jam

== Halfway Holiday/Roach Trip Challenge ==
A new feature for I'm A Celebrity allowed three celebrities to have the opportunity of escaping the jungle for a one night chance of luxury. Shortly after the arrival of Annabel and Vincent in the camp, the celebrities were told to get into four groups of three in order to complete the next challenge set for them. Each celebrity picked a stick. If their stick had a coloured tip, it meant they were team captains. The captains were Steve, David, Amy and Vincent. Each team had to wear Hawaiian type shirts indicating their team colour (blue, pink, purple or orange). The winners would get to spend a night of luxury while the remaining nine celebrities got on a bus with various creatures, including rats, snakes, cockroaches etc.

The teams were as follows:

- Team Blue: Steve, Kian and Laila
- Team Purple: David, Matthew and Rebecca
- Team Orange: Amy, Joey and Annabel
- Team Pink: Vincent, Alfonso and Lucy

=== Challenges ===
Bold indicates that the team won the challenge

Episode	Air Date	Name	Teams	Description
**7**	November	'Freaky Tiki Bar'	**Team Blue** vs. Team Pink	The celebrities had to drink from various glasses, each containing a different jungle flavour. As soon as the person had drunk the contents, a code was revealed enabling the second person to unpadlock their drink and continue the challenge. After the final person had finished, a code was revealed to a hammer to hit a gong. It was between Kian and Lucy. The first person to hit the gong was Kian, leading the blue team to their victory.
**8**	November	'Grot tubs'	**Team Purple** vs. Team Orange	The celebrities were told to find letters in their given hot-tub which contained various things including fish guts. After a word was created from the letters within the hot-tub, the following celebrity could complete their stage. Once every celebrity in a team had created a word, they won. The winners were the purple team. Amy got upset because she did not get a go.
**9**	November	'Baggage Claim'	**Team Blue** vs. Team Purple	The challenge involved a chosen celebrity from each team being selected to answer a geography general knowledge question. If the celebrity got the answer correct, they could choose from up to 12 different coloured suitcases in order to discover if they had won a "boarding pass" or would be gunked. The quickest team to receive 3 boarding passes (for each celebrity) was the winner.

Steve, Laila and Kian left the trial to spend their night in luxury whilst the remaining 9 losing celebrities spent a night on 'The Roach Trip'. The winners jetted off to a beautiful holiday resort outside the jungle. On the second day of the holiday, the crew unexpectedly got a reunion off of their loved ones each. Kian was met with his wife Jodi, Steve met his wife Jeannie and Laila was reunited with her sister Jacqueline. When they returned, Steve, Kian and Laila each had three messages each to deliver to the celebrities. It was from their loved ones and it left the camp very emotional.

== Episodes ==
No.	Title	Original release date	Duration
1	"Episode 1"	17 November 2013	90 minutes
The celebrities were separated at first. Alfonso, Joey, Lucy and Steve were told by Ant and Dec that they would be split into two teams; Alfonso and Lucy made one team while Joey and Steve made the other. Both teams parachuted down to an island where they were set a task to find the designated 'legs' of the race indicated by a single signpost. At each leg, the pair who got there first could pick which celebrity (out of a choice of two placed at each leg) they would like on their team. The losing team had no choice but to accept the remaining celebrity at each leg. At the end of three legs, the completed team of Amy, Joey, Laila, Rebecca and Steve emerged the winners and were rewarded with one last night in luxury away from the island, where the losing team of Alfonso, David, Kian, Lucy and Matthew had to spend the night on the island. Both teams then had to take part in the first bushtucker trial: The Turntables of Terror. The Yellow team won the trial, and therefore moved into the nicer camp, Croc Creek; whereas the other team had to go to 'Snake Rock'. Ant and Dec announced facing the next trial (Monday Night Takeaway) would be Joey for Snake Rock and Matthew for Croc Creek.
2	"Episode 2"	18 November 2013	60 minutes
Joey for Snake Rock, and Matthew for Croc Creek face the first public-voted bushtucker trial: Monday Night Takeaway. The trial consisted of eating a variety of jungle nasties, including ostrich penis, turkey testicles and pork brain. After five meals, the score was tied and therefore the trial went to tie break - the first to drink a cockroach smoothie would win. Joey won the tiebreak, and therefore the trial, taking home the maximum five stars for Snake Rock; while Matthew left empty handed. Elsewhere, Joey was taught how to read a clock by his fellow campmates, much to the surprise of Steve that he did not know how. Ant and Dec then announced that facing the next trial, Up to your neck in it, would be Joey for Snake Rock and Matthew for Croc Creek; meaning it would be the second trial in a row for both the respective celebrities.
3	"Episode 3"	20 November 2013	90 minutes
Joey for Snake Rock and Matthew for Croc Creek face the next head-to-head bushtucker trial: 'Up to Your Neck in It'. It consisted of standing in a huge sand timer and enduring a collection of jungle critters being dropped on you. Joey won the trial for the second day in a row, and therefore gained all the food for Snake Rock. Both camps then faced 'The Clash of the Camps' - a series of games to win treats, extra food and there luxury items. At the end of the episode, the two camps came together in the bigger Crock Creek. They now became a united camp. Ant and Dec then announced that facing the next trial 'Submerged' would be Joey; for the third time in a row.
4	"Episode 4"	21 November 2013	60 minutes
Joey faces the latest bushtucker trial 'Submerged'. Here, he was trapped in an underwater submarine attempting to collect as many stars as possible from its interior; including in its water leaks and the cabin lockers (which were reminiscent of a 'Hell Holes' type trial). Joey won seven out of a possible ten stars. The Dingo Dollar challenge also returned, and facing the first of the series was David and Steve who had to try and ring as much water out of washing as possible. They succeeded in the challenge, and the camp got the subsequent question right. As a treat for winning, the camp won marshmallows. There was a discussion in camp about beauty, which sparked an argument between Amy and Rebecca, the latter of who said that she'd receive some kind of negative comment daily because of the way she looked, a statement Amy ignored. Rebecca then broke down crying, only to be consoled by Laila. Ironically, Ant and Dec then announced that facing the latest bushtucker trial 'Hang Glider from Hell' would be Amy; putting an end to Joey's run of three consecutive trials.
5	"Episode 5"	22 November 2013	60 minutes
Amy faces the latest trial, 'Hang Glider from Hell'. In this trial, Amy was trapped in a glass cuboid container high above the ground (reminiscent of David Haye's "Scare-o-plane trial last year) and had to unlock various codes to obtain stars, the codes were underneath her. She managed to get seven stars, which she was happy with. In the Dingo Dollars challenge, Matthew and Kian had to dig up various signs in the ground telling them where to go and dig up next. Once they finished (back where they started), they won the dollars and ended up winning crisps. Also in this episode, two new celebrities- Vincent and Annabel- were flown in via a helicopter and had to spend a night in the "Outback Factory" where they attached various corks to hats. They managed 307, with the maximum number being 600. Campmates were then told by Ant & Dec they would not be doing a trial tomorrow, as Vincent and Annabel would be competing against each other- with the celebrities backing who they thought would win. Note During the final few minutes of the episode, where Ant & Dec were speaking to the celebrities, the sound was lost because of "Technical Issues".
6	"Episode 6"	23 November 2013	60 minutes
Vincent and Annabel did the bush tucker trial which involved them holding critters in their mouth. They went to a tie breaker at the end of the trial, when they had to drink a beverage made with cockroaches and mealworms. (The first person to completely drink it won) The winner ended up being Vincent. Ant and Dec then revealed who the camp thought would win. Luckily, they thought it would be Vincent so he got to go back with 6 meals for camp, while Annabel had to go back to the outback shack until further notice. Alfonso and Joey later did a crossword puzzle involving questions about Annabel's past, which if they got right, Annabel could get out of the outback shack and go to camp- and she did.
7	"Episode 7"	24 November 2013	90 minutes
8	"Episode 8"	25 November 2013	60 minutes
9	"Episode 9"	27 November 2013	90 minutes
10	"Episode 10"	28 November 2013	60 minutes
11	"Episode 11"	29 November 2013	90 minutes
Rebecca takes part in the newest trial, "Drown Under". In the trial, she had to solve a maze underwater dragging stars across the maze. She won all the stars, and everyone was pleased. Later, Alfonso finally snapped and shouted at Mathew when the latter tried to correct his grammar. Joey and Kian also solved a puzzle winning one immunity token for someone in the camp. They chose Laila, whom actually did not want it, as she had been saying how much she wanted to leave camp. The celebrities then took part in a challenge which involved unscrewing panels with items on, such as Sausage rolls. They managed to unscrew nearly all of them and were happy. It was announced that Amy had been voted to be a camp saviour.
12	"Episode 12"	30 November 2013	65 minutes
The show began with a look into the camp and recapping the fact that Amy had become the 3rd camp saviour and the other celebrities views on this. David participated in the trial and received 8 stars, losing one. We also saw Joey, Kian and Amy participate in the Camp Saviour challenge which involved them putting at least 100 gold nuggets into a mine car down a chute. They were joined by various jungle critters including many rats. They all managed to exceed 100 nuggets and earned 3 immunity tokens, allowing Rebecca, David and Vincent to be immune for the first vote off which takes place tomorrow. The final part of the show revealed Ant and Dec visiting the camp to reveal that all the campmates (apart from those immune) would participate in the Bushtucker Trial to earn food and the winner would also become immune from the first vote off.
13	"Episode 13"	1 December 2013	90 minutes
The latest installment of the contraband controversy began this episode, concluding with Amy handing in some concealer. Annabel also became tearful after hearing the news of her participating in the Bushtucker Trial that day. The non-immune celebrities also participated in the latest Bushtucker Trial, "Critter Crates", involving them unlocking padlocks in order to be freed from the crate. Matthew was the first to exit his respective crate followed by Alfonso, earning 3 stars for camp. Matthew was also rewarded with the final immunity token as he was first out. Lucy and Steve participated in the Dingo Dollar Challenge, involving Lucy connecting cables together to create a connection while Steve narrated the order of the cable parts from up in the air. They won and chose digestive biscuits. The celebrities back at camp got the answer correct, however tempers frayed between Amy, Matthew and Annabel again as Amy didn't "answer quick enough". Lucy and Steve returned to camp and pretended they hadn't won. Joey was really excited about a biscuit! The celebrities celebrated their last meal together before the vote offs which was crocodile chipolatas. The celebrities also talked about their relations together as well as their own take on each other. This was an emotional moment for the celebrities. The first person was also voted out of the camp. This was Annabel.
14	"Episode 14"	2 December 2013	90 minutes
This episode began with Laila taking on the challenge, Who Dares Wins Stars. This involved Ant and Dec daring her to have various things put on her, including soldier crabs and a crocodile as well as unscrewing stars with her tongue and removing stars from around an ostrich's neck. Back at camp, Amy and Rebecca have decided to talk to the other girls to clear the air with the rivalry between the girls and Amy. This led to Amy revealing that Alfonso had told her that Lucy was the ring-leader in this issue which caused Lucy to fall out with Alfonso. Some wipes also went missing which heated the argument even further. Kian and Vincent participated in the latest Dingo Dollar challenge involving semaphore flags and a high-wire. Kian had to translate the semaphore provided by Vincent in order to find the dollars. They message read, 'To find dollars, look up.' They chose crumpets out of the options, but the celebrities got the question wrong which resulted in them not winning any treats. The celebrities were split into two teams, the blue team (David, Steve, Joey, Rebecca and Vincent) and the red team (Kian, Alfonso, Amy, Lucy and Matthew) with Laila as the quizmaster and they each answered questions about the other celebrities. The blue team won, which resulted in them winning the treat of attending the "Jungle Arms" for the night. Laila also attended the pub as she chose the golden ball. As a result for Laila's 10 stars, the celebrities were rewarded with 2 emu eggs. However, the celebrities weren't happy with the meal and received it negatively unanimously (apart from Joey and Amy). The celebrities that won the question challenge visited the pub. They each had a pint of beer, some crisps as well as DJ K Roo choosing some songs for them to dance to. The second celebrity was also voted off at the end of the show. This was Laila.
15	"Episode 15"	3 December 2013	90 minutes
The episode began with Ant and Dec revealing that not one, but two celebrities will depart the jungle this evening. The celebrities also showed their sadness to the loss of Laila in the previous episode. Steve also took on the latest Bushtucker Trial which involved him crossing some moving steps whilst clinging to a rockface. Unfortunately, he won 3 stars. Alfonso is also starting to struggle with jungle life and this episode highlighted this. David consoled him regarding this and tried to give him a pep-talk and get "the old Al back". Rebecca and Joey also did the Dingo Dollar Challenge which involved them finding jigsaw puzzle pieces in mail strewn across the creek. Joey also found a stick insect and was intrigued. After creating the jigsaw letter, they had to count the letters in the letter which was 1601. This won them the dingo dollars. However, the celebrities got the question wrong so they didn't receive any chocolate brownies. Matthew argued that the surveys were biased and unfair. This episode was the day that Alfonso demonstrated to all the celebrities in camp the 'Carlton Dance' as well as the 'Jump on It' dance. David's view: 'Alfonso is well and truly back'. As a result of Steve winning 3 stars, the celebrities won an eel. The celebrities had split opinions on the meal with Vincent hailing it as nice and Lucy calling it trash. Straight after dinner, Tom Jones started playing in the camp and all the celebrities began dancing the 'Carlton Dance'. It was just what the celebrities needed today - Matthew. Two celebrities were voted out of the competition this evening. They were Vincent and Matthew.
16	"Episode 16"	4 December 2013	90 minutes
This episode began with a recap of the double elimination from last night, as well as the new conflict between Alfonso and Lucy. Kian and Alfonso also took on the next Bushtucker Trial which involved the two of them being suspended in the air on separate planks and Alfonso throwing stars back to Kian to catch. Each star was worth 2 meals for camp. They got all 8 stars with 14 seconds to spare. David and Lucy took on today's dingo dollar challenge. They won and the celebrities got the question correct, meaning they won some twiglets for the camp. The celebrities also took part in the challenge 'Save or Delete' meaning that if they won, they would unlock an email from a loved one. They all managed to unlock an email for each other. There were many tears as all the letters were read. After Kian and Alfonso earning 8 stars in today's trial, the campmates won croc feet for dinner. Once again, the celebrities weren't happy with the meal. At the end of the episode, Ant and Dec revealed the next celebrity to leave the camp. This was Steve.
17	"Episode 17"	5 December 2013	90 minutes
This episode began with Ant and Dec again revealing that 2 celebrities will be departing this evening. We also looked at the celebrities reactions after the departure of Steve Davis the previous evening. Amy was chosen to take on today's trial called 'Surf and Turf'. While Amy took on the trial, she left her bag at camp which caused disturbance among the group, once again leading to the suspicions with Amy's "makeup". This particular Bushtucker Trial involved her taking one key at a time and making her way through 3 tanks before unlocking a box to receive a star. Amy then had to repeat the process in order to try and win every star. Near the end of the trial, there was an incident involving a snake hissing at Amy, preventing here from winning the final star. In the end, she won 6 stars for camp. This Dingo Dollar challenge was completed by Alfonso and Joey, involving them dressing up as cockroaches and searching through rubbish in order to find eggs with numbers in. After they had found all the numbers, they had to use maths to figure out a correct sum. They unlocked the dingo dollars and visited the Outback Shack. The celebrities got the question wrong and won nothing for camp. The celebrities went head to head in order to win a ticket to the 'Jungle Hot Tub Party' by playing against famous British celebrities, on a TV. Alfonso had to spin around a fixed spot more times than Dermot O'Leary in 20 seconds. Alfonso won and got a ticket. Next, Lucy had to do last longer than Ashley Roberts doing hula hooping. She lost. Kian went ahead against Peter Andre at squirting soap out of a dispenser and won. David took on Davina McCall in the 'Long Note Challenge' where he had to sustain a note for the longest. David also won. Rebecca went ahead against Janet Street-Porter in unravelling a sellotape reel. She lost. Joey went against Stephen Mulhern in 'Ping-Pong Pickup', which involved Joey holding Ping-Pong balls in his mouth and transferring them from one box to another, resulting in Joey winning. Amy went against Mel B and had to name as many animals as she could in an allotted number of time. She won a ticket also. An extra prize whilst at the party was Strawberries dipped in Chocolate and Kian and Alfonso volunteered. They had to transfer eggs individually using their mouths. They went up against Eamonn Holmes and Ruth Langsford, resulting in them winning the Strawberries and Chocolate. As a result of Amy winning 6 stars, they were rewarded with Baby Octopus and Wallaby Rump. The celebrities were also intrigued by Amy and Joey cooking, even though they dropped the rump steak on the floor! The 5 winners of the 'Star Wars' challenge were rewarded with a trip to the hot-tub. However, Lucy and Rebecca were left behind. This gave them time alone to discuss their views about the other celebrities. The celebrities in the hot-tub also spoke about how being on the show had affected their life so far. Ant and Dec made their way into camp to reveal that Alfonso, after many times being in the bottom two and Rebecca would be leaving.
18	"Episode 18"	6 December 2013	90 minutes
This episode began recapping the news that Rebecca and Alfonso left yesterday and the celebrities views with this - Kian and Amy became emotional. All the celebrities took part in the traditional trial - Celebrity Cyclone today. They got all 5 stars in total. David and Amy also did today's Dingo Dollar challenge resulting in them getting 100 Dingo Dollars into a bag before a visit to the Outback Shack. The celebrities got the question wrong so didn't win a treat. Once again, contraband has been announced as being in camp. This is the 3rd time. If no contraband was handed in, the celebrities would only be rewarded with 2 meals instead of 5. However, Amy handed in the required contraband and finally "ContrabandGate" has been laid to rest... The celebrities also competed in a game to earn calls for loved ones. They had to find telephone numbers hidden around the camp which had 5 that were invalid and 5 that connect them to loved ones. Everyone apart from Kian got to speak to their loved ones. They had fish for dinner as a result for them winning 5 stars in the Bushtucker Trial. Ant and Dec made their way into camp to announce that Amy and Joey will leave the camp forever.
19	"Episode 19"	7 December 2013	60 minutes
This episode began with a recap of the loss of Joey and Amy the previous night. The celebrities were shocked, particularly at the loss of Joey, and were even bordering on tears. Kian also spoke about his life in Westlife. The trial today was compulsory for all the celebrities and was called, 'In a Spin'. This involved each of them sitting in a spinnable "cot" along with various jungle creatures: Lucy had a Monitor Lizard, Kian rats and David some snakes which were particularly "friendly" and one even went up his t-shirt. They managed to earn 2 of the 3 stars. All the celebrities spoke more about the contraband scandal and discussed their views on Amy. Next, they played a game called, 'With a Little Help From Our Friends', which involved the evicted celebrities answering general knowledge questions about a particular category in order to win lost Dingo Dollar Challenge prizes. The celebrities who got their question correct were: Steve with Maths winning Cookies, Annabel with Politics earning Cheese and Biscuits, Laila with TV winning Baked Beans and Matthew with Animals winning Crumpets. The celebrities who were wrong were: Rebecca with Geography, Alfonso with Technology, Vincent with Fashion, Amy with Pop Music and Joey with History. Next the celebrities spoke about their views of I'm a Celebrity, David thought it was an illusion, Lucy thought she would be scared of the people but was wrong and Kian felt it had brought all the celebrities closer together. After winning 2 stars, the celebrities were rewarded with Wallaby Sausages for dinner, which they had with their Baked Beans - see above. Over dinner, they began to reminisce about their previous campmates. At the end of the episode, Lucy was announced to be leaving the camp and taking 3rd place.
20	"The Final"	8 December 2013	65 minutes
The final episode of this series kicked off with a recap of the loss of Lucy the previous night. The final Bushtucker Trial of the series was compulsory and called, 'Final Feast'. It involved David and Kian each eating various things in order to win a 3 course meal along with beverages. Examples of food included: Ostrich Anus, Pig Penis, Fish Eyes, Cockroaches and a mixture of blended Mealworms, Crickets and Cockroaches. Each celebrity completed their food/drink, earning 4 stars, and the pass to a luxury meal this evening. They got to pick their own food and David went for a main-course of Steak whereas Kian went for a Cheeseburger. After the meal of the evening, Ant and Dec showed a recap of the best-bits of the series, including: Steve falling in before his particular trial, "ContrabandGate" and the Carlton Dance. After speaking to David and Kian, Ant and Dec revealed that the winner of Series 13 of I'm a Celebrity...Get Me Out of Here was Kian Egan. He was presented with the jungle crown and sceptre by last years winner, Charlie Brooks.

== Ratings ==
Official ratings are taken from BARB. There were no shows on the 19 and 26 November due to live football being shown, but Get Me Out of Here! NOW! still aired as normal. The first episode of the series achieved the highest ever rating for an opening I'm a Celebrity episode.

Episode	Airdate	Official ITV rating (millions)	ITV Weekly rank	Official ITV HD rating (millions)	Official ITV +1 rating (millions)	Total ITV viewers (millions)	Overnight share
1	17 November	11.25	1	1.80	0.47	13.52	45.5%
2	18 November	10.04	2	1.73	0.71	12.48	39.3%
3	20 November	9.36	3	1.52	0.44	11.32	40.2%
4	21 November	9.15	5	1.54	0.56	11.25	39.1%
5	22 November	9.23	4	1.58	0.61	11.42	38.4%
6	23 November	8.95	8	1.63	0.56	11.14	36.8%
7	24 November	10.05	1	1.61	0.41	12.07	41.2%
8	25 November	9.26	3	1.48	0.56	11.30	37.8%
9	27 November	8.89	4	1.44	0.45	10.78	38.7%
10	28 November	8.78	7	1.43	0.45	10.66	37.4%
11	29 November	8.80	6	1.40	0.40	10.60	38.5%
12	30 November	8.45	10	1.38	0.42	10.25	36.7%
13	1 December	8.70	8	2.10	0.41	11.21	37.1%
14	2 December	8.28	10	1.34	0.62	10.24	32.2%
15	3 December	8.49	7	1.33	0.60	10.42	32.4%
16	4 December	8.59	6	1.38	0.50	10.47	36.6%
17	5 December	8.35	8	1.52	0.33	10.20	36.6%
18	6 December	8.71	3	1.61	—N/a	10.32	38.2%
19	7 December	8.63	5	1.37	0.33	10.33	38.7%
20	8 December	10.19	1	1.73	0.34	12.26	42.0%
Series average	2013	9.16	—N/a	1.55	0.48	11.11	38.2%
Coming Out	11 December	6.41	9	1.11	0.61	8.13	27.4%
