= Educating Joey Essex =

- Genre: Reality
- Starring: Joey Essex
- Narrated by: Phillip Schofield
- Country of origin: United Kingdom
- Original language: English
- No. of series: 2
- No. of episodes: 14

Production
- Running time: 60 minutes (inc. adverts)
- Production company: Lime Pictures

Original release
- Network: ITV2
- Release: 16 March 2014 – 22 December 2016

Related
- The Only Way Is Essex

Educating Joey Essex is a British television programme which began airing on ITV2 on 16 March 2014. The show features former The Only Way Is Essex star Joey Essex travelling the world to learn things, and is narrated by Phillip Schofield. The show title is a similarity to the 2011 Channel 4 reality show Educating Essex.

The first programme aired in March 2014 and was originally planned to be a one-off special. On 5 June 2014, a full series was announced.

In 2016 it was announced that Educating Joey Essex would return for a second series filming started in April. Series 2 premiered 12 June 2016.

Essex announced whilst on ITV This Morning on 28 June 2017 that he would like to do another series of Educating Joey Essex or a one-off special. Joey also said that there needs to be a reason to do another episode or series and at the moment there isn't but the series is still on his mind for a return.

== Series overview ==
| Series | Episodes | Originally released | |
| Series | Episodes | First released | Last released |
|---|---|---|---|
| 1 | 7 | 16 March 2014 | 5 May 2015 |
| 2 | 7 | 12 June 2016 | 22 December 2016 |

=== Series One ===
| # | Series total | Date aired | Title | Note(s) |
|---|---|---|---|---|
| 1 | 1 | 16 March 2014 | Africa | |
| 2 | 2 | 22 June 2014 | Football Fever | 'World Cup' special |
| 3 | 3 | 2 September 2014 | Space Cadet | |
| 4 | 4 | 31 October 2014 | Reem Halloween | |
| 5 | 5 | 10 December 2014 | Winter Essex-pedition | |
| 6 | 6 | 10 February 2015 | Supermodel Student | |
| 7 | 7 | 5 May 2015 | General Election, What Are You Saying? | |

=== Series Two ===
| # | Series total | Date aired | Title | Note(s) |
|---|---|---|---|---|
| 1 | 8 | 12 June 2016 | Reem Queen at 90 | |
| 2 | 9 | 19 June 2016 | What EU Saying? | |
| 3 | 10 | 25 August 2016 | GCSE special | Under the show name "Re-Educating Joey Essex" |
| 4 | 11 | 1 November 2016 | The American Reem | |
| 5 | 12 | 2 November 2016 | The American Reem | |
| 6 | 13 | 3 November 2016 | The American Reem | |
| 7 | 14 | 22 December 2016 | "What You Sleighing" | Christmas special |

Notes

- There is also going to be a US election special, starring Donald Trump and Hillary Clinton.
- For episode 3 in series 2, filming also took place on 25 August 2016 before transmission later that day where Joey Essex receives his GCSE results.
- Episode 4,5, and 6 was a three parter.

== Releases ==
Three episodes of series one have been made available on Amazon Instant Video UK
