= I Feel Something in the Air =

Single by Cher

from the album Chér
- B-side: "Come to Your Window"
- Released: 1966
- Genre: Pop; folk
- Length: 3:51
- Label: Imperial
- Songwriter: Sonny Bono
- Producer: Sonny Bono

Cher singles chronology
"Alfie" (1966)	"I Feel Something in the Air" (1966)	"Sunny" (1966)

"I Feel Something in The Air"

"I Feel Something in the Air" is a song written and produced by Sonny Bono that was released as the second single from Cher's third album Chér in 1966. Cash Box noted that Cher delivered "more of the striking Cher sound" on "Magic in the Air", praising its "original" instrumentation and "remarkably constructed" composition, while adding that the flip side "speaks a teen-market language of its own".

"I Feel Something in the Air" became a minor hit by peaking at number 43 on the UK Singles Chart. However, it failed to reach the U.S. charts. The song was also known, and released as "Magic in the Air" in some places.

Cher also recorded the song in Italian, as "Nel Mio Cielo Ci Sei Tu".

== Charts ==
1966 weekly chart performance for "I Feel Something in the Air"
Chart 1966)	Peak position
Canadian Singles Chart	89
UK Singles Chart	43
