= Splash! (British TV series) series 1 =

Splash!
- Series 1
- Presented by: Gabby Logan; Vernon Kay
- Judges: Andy Banks; Jo Brand; Leon Taylor
- Winner: Eddie "The Eagle" Edwards
- No. of episodes: 5

Release
- Original network: ITV
- Original release: 5 January – 2 February 2013

Series chronology
- Next → Series 2

Splash! is a British television show which teaches celebrities the art of diving with the aid of Tom Daley. The first series began broadcasting on 5 January 2013 and ended on 2 February 2013. Gabby Logan and Vernon Kay hosted the series, with Andy Banks, Jo Brand and Leon Taylor as judges, and commentary by Alan March.

== Contestants ==
The fifteen celebrities were revealed on 2 January 2013. Jennifer Metcalfe withdrew before the series began and was replaced by Donna Air.

Celebrity	Known for	Heat	Status
Jade Ewen	Sugababes singer	1	Eliminated 1st on 5 January 2013
Helen Lederer	Comedian, actress, & writer	1	Eliminated 2nd on 5 January 2013
Jenni Falconer	Television & radio presenter	1	Eliminated 3rd on 5 January 2013
Diarmuid Gavin	Garden designer	2	Eliminated 4th on 12 January 2013
Caprice	Model & actress	2	Eliminated 5th on 12 January 2013
Joey Essex	The Only Way Is Essex star	2	Eliminated 6th on 12 January 2013
Donna Air	Actress & television presenter	3	Eliminated 7th on 19 January 2013
Dom Joly	Comedian & television presenter	3	Eliminated 8th on 19 January 2013
Tina Malone	Shameless actress	3	Eliminated 9th on 19 January 2013
Anthony Ogogo	Olympic professional boxer	3	Withdrew on 26 January 2013
Charlotte Jackson	Sky Sports News presenter	2	Eliminated 10th on 26 January 2013
Omid Djalili	Stand-up comedian & actor	1	Eliminated 10th on 26 January 2013
Linda Barker	Interior designer & television presenter	3	Third place on 2 February 2013
Jake Canuso	Benidorm actor	1	Runner-up on 2 February 2013
Eddie "The Eagle" Edwards	Olympic ski jumper	2	Winner on 2 February 2013

== Scoring chart ==
Celebrity	Place	1	2	3	4	Final
Eddie "The Eagle" Edwards	1	—	27.5	—	29.0	30.0+29.0=59.0
Jake Canuso	2	22.0	—	—	27.0	27.5+28.0=55.5
Linda Barker	3	—	—	25.5	25.5	26.5+27.5=54.0
Charlotte Jackson	4	—	22.5	—	19.0	
Omid Djalili	5	23.0	—	—	22.0	
Anthony Ogogo	6	—	—	22.0	WD	
Tina Malone	7	—	—	13.0		
Dom Joly	8	—	—	20.0		
Donna Air	9	—	—	17.0		
Joey Essex	10	—	19.5			
Caprice	11	—	24.5			
Diarmuid Gavin	12	—	16.5			
Jenni Falconer	13	20.5				
Helen Lederer	14	14.0				
Jade Ewen	15	18.0				

Red numbers indicate the lowest score for each week
Green numbers indicate the highest score for each week
indicates the celebrities eliminated each week
indicates the celebrities in the Splash!-off each week
indicates the celebrity withdrew that week
indicates the winning celebrity
indicates the runner-up celebrity
indicates the third place celebrity
"—" indicates that the celebrity did not dive that week

== Live show details ==
=== Heat 1 (5 January) ===
Order	Celebrity	Judges' scores			Total	Scoreboard	Dive		Points			Public vote %	Result
Order	Celebrity	Banks	Brand	Taylor	Total	Scoreboard	Type	Height	Judges	Public	Total	Public vote %	Result
1	Jade Ewen	5.0	7.5	5.5	18.0	4th	Pike fall	5 metre	2	2	4	8.20%	Eliminated
2	Jake Canuso	6.5	8.0	7.5	22.0	2nd	Pike somersault	5 metre	4	4	8	18.13%	Saved by the judges
3	Helen Lederer	4.0	5.0	5.0	14.0	5th	Pike fall	3 metre	1	1	2	4.65%	Eliminated
4	Jenni Falconer	6.0	8.0	6.5	20.5	3rd	1 1/2 somersault	3 metre springboard	3	3	6	17.47%	Eliminated by the judges
5	Omid Djalili	7.5	9.0	6.5	23.0	1st	The Swan	10 metre	5	5	10	50.55%	Saved by the public

Judges' votes to save

- Banks: Jenni Falconer
- Brand: Jake Canuso
- Taylor: Jake Canuso

=== Heat 2 (12 January) ===
Order	Celebrity	Judges' scores			Total	Scoreboard	Dive		Points			Public vote %	Result
Order	Celebrity	Banks	Brand	Taylor	Total	Scoreboard	Type	Height	Judges	Public	Total	Public vote %	Result
1	Joey Essex	6.0	7.5	6.0	19.5	4th	Tuck	10 metre	2	4	6	25.97%	Eliminated by the judges
2	Caprice	8.0	8.5	8.0	24.5	2nd	1 1/2 somersault	3 metre springboard	4	2	6	10.62%	Eliminated
3	Diarmuid Gavin	5.0	6.5	5.0	16.5	5th	Pike fall	5 metre	1	1	2	1.75%	Eliminated
4	Charlotte Jackson	7.0	8.0	7.5	22.5	3rd	Pike fall	7 metre	3	3	6	12.27%	Saved by the judges
5	Eddie "The Eagle" Edwards	9.0	9.5	9.0	27.5	1st	1 1/2 somersault pike	10 metre	5	5	10	49.39%	Saved by the public

Judges' votes to save

- Banks: Joey Essex
- Brand: Charlotte Jackson
- Taylor: Charlotte Jackson

=== Heat 3 (19 January) ===
Order	Celebrity	Judges' scores			Total	Scoreboard	Dive		Points			Public vote %	Result
Order	Celebrity	Banks	Brand	Taylor	Total	Scoreboard	Type	Height	Judges	Public	Total	Public vote %	Result
1	Linda Barker	8.0	9.0	8.5	25.5	1st	Tuck dive	7 1/2 metre	5	4	9	33.57%	Saved by the judges
2	Dom Joly	6.5	7.0	6.5	20.0	3rd	Swan dive	10 metre	3	1	4	4.89%	Eliminated
3	Donna Air	5.0	6.5	5.5	17.0	4th	Pike fall	5 metre	2	2	4	4.95%	Eliminated
4	Tina Malone	4.0	5.0	4.0	13.0	5th	Pike fall	3 metre	1	3	4	7.41%	Eliminated by the judges
5	Anthony Ogogo	7.0	8.0	7.0	22.0	2nd	Backward somersault	7 1/2 metre	4	5	9	49.18%	Saved by the public

Judges' votes to save

- Banks: Linda Barker
- Brand: Tina Malone
- Taylor: Linda Barker

=== Semi-final (26 January) ===
Order	Celebrity	Judges' scores			Total	Scoreboard	Dive		Points			Public vote %	Result
Order	Celebrity	Banks	Brand	Taylor	Total	Scoreboard	Type	Height	Judges	Public	Total	Public vote %	Result
1	Anthony Ogogo	*	*	*	*	*	*	*	*	*	*	*	Withdrew
2	Omid Djalili	7.0	8.0	7.0	22.0	4th	Forward pike	10 metre	2	1	3	5.90%	Eliminated
3	Linda Barker	8.0	9.0	8.5	25.5	3rd	Inward tuck	10 metre	3	4	7	14.62%	Safe
4	Jake Canuso	9.0	9.0	9.0	27.0	2nd	Armstand forward somersault	7 1/2 metre	4	3	7	12.01%	Bottom three
5	Charlotte Jackson	6.0	7.0	6.0	19.0	5th	Pike fall	10 metre	1	2	3	6.05%	Eliminated
6	Eddie "The Eagle" Edwards	9.5	10.0	9.5	29.0	1st	1 1/2 inward somersault	10 metre	5	5	10	61.42%	Safe

* Due to injury Ogogo had to withdraw from the competition

Judges' votes to save

- Banks: Jake Canuso
- Brand: Omid Djalili
- Taylor: Jake Canuso

=== Final (2 February) ===
Order	Celebrity	Judges' scores			Total	Grand total	Scoreboard	Dive		Points	Public vote %	Result
Order	Celebrity	Banks	Brand	Taylor	Total	Grand total	Scoreboard	Type	Height	Points	Public vote %	Result
1	Linda Barker	8.5	9.5	8.5	26.5	54.0	3rd	Forward 1 1/2 somersault	5 metre	1	12.00%	Third place
1	Linda Barker	9.0	9.5	9.0	27.5	54.0	3rd	Inward tuck synchronized	10 metre	1	12.00%	Third place
2	Eddie "The Eagle" Edwards	10.0	10.0	10.0	30.0	59.0	1st	Forward 2 1/2 somersault	10 metre	3	71.98%	Winner
2	Eddie "The Eagle" Edwards	9.5	10.0	9.5	29.0	59.0	1st	Inward 1 1/2 somersault pike synchronized	10 metre	3	71.98%	Winner
3	Jake Canuso	9.0	9.5	9.0	27.5	55.5	2nd	Armstand forward somersault pike	10 metre	2	16.02%	Runner-up
3	Jake Canuso	9.0	10.0	9.0	28.0	55.5	2nd	Forward 1 1/2 somersault pike synchronized	7 1/2 metre	2	16.02%	Runner-up

== Ratings ==
Show	Date	Official ITV rating (millions)	ITV weekly rank	Share	Official ITV HD rating (millions)	Total ITV viewers (millions)
Heat 1	5 January	5.19	17	22.9%	0.76	5.95
Heat 2	12 January	5.19	18	22.4%	—N/a	5.19
Heat 3	19 January	5.02	16	21.5%	—N/a	5.02
Semi-final	26 January	4.75	18	21.3%	—N/a	4.75
Final	2 February	5.28	16	23.8%	—N/a	5.28
Series average	2013	5.09	—N/a	—N/a	0.76	—N/a
