= Flavia Cacace =

Italian British professional dancer

Flavia Cacace-Mistry
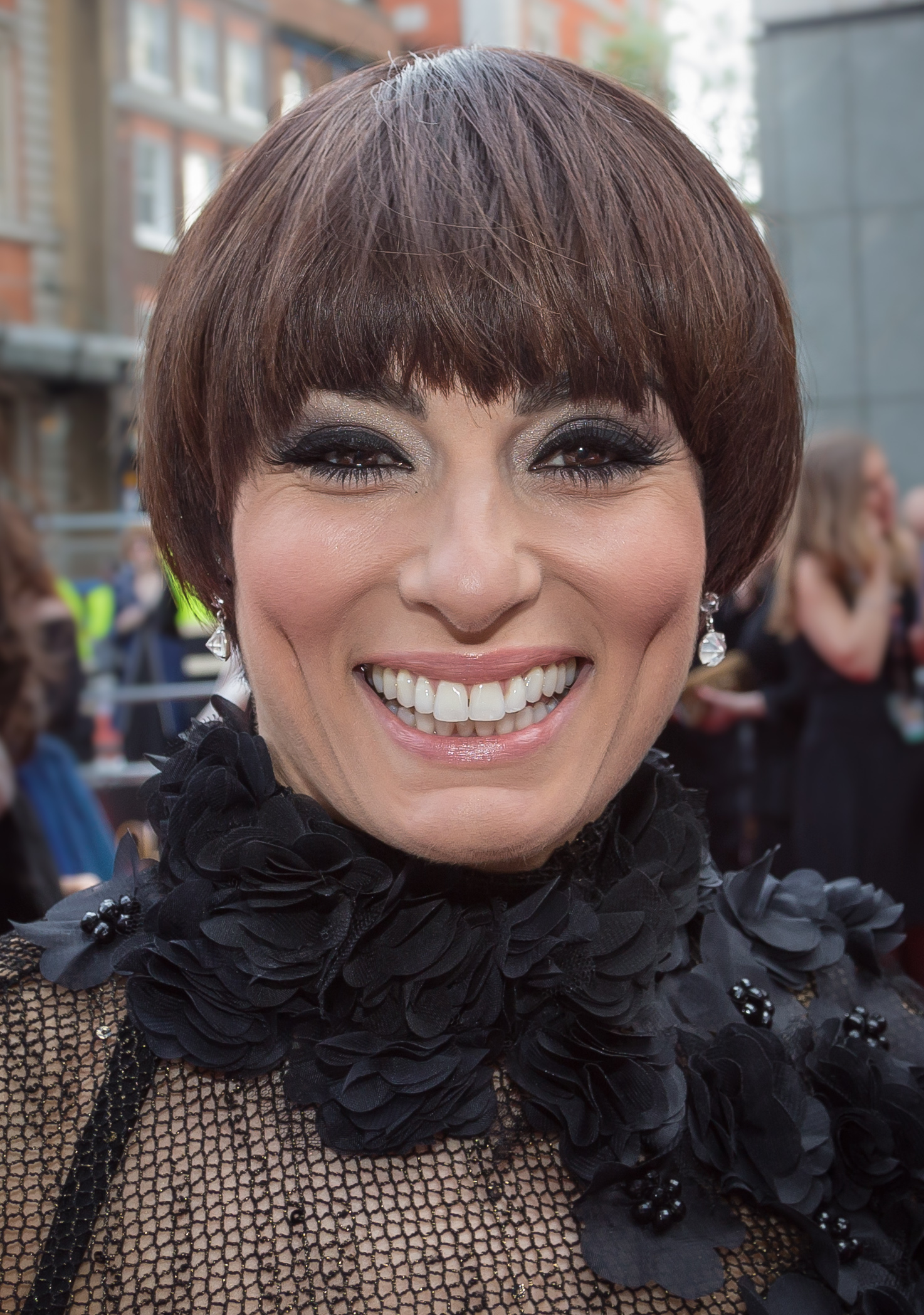
- Cacace at the 2015 Laurence Olivier Awards
- Born: March 13, 1980 (age 46); Naples, Italy
- Occupations: Dancer, choreographer
- Known for: With dance partner Vincent Simone: UK Professional Ten Dance Champions 2002–2006; UK Professional Showdance Champions 2003–2006; UK Argentine Tango Champions, 2006; UK Ballroom Champions
- Height: 5 ft 2 in (1.57 m)
- Spouse: Jimi Mistry (m. 2013)
- Partner(s): Matt Di Angelo (2007–2010); Vincent Simone (1999–2007)

Flavia Cacace-Mistry (born March 13, 1980) is an Italian British professional dancer. Her professional dance partner is Vincent Simone (they are branded when performing together as 'Vincent and Flavia'), and between 2006–2012 both partners appeared on the BBC's Strictly Come Dancing.

== Early life ==
Cacace was born in Naples, the youngest of six children, and came to the United Kingdom with her family at the age of four when her father (a chef) moved to another job. She attended St Peter's Catholic School in Guildford, and left in 1995.

== Career ==
=== Strictly Come Dancing ===
Highest and lowest scoring performances per dance

Dance	Partner	Highest	Partner	Lowest
American Smooth	Matt Di Angelo	36	Russell Grant	26
Argentine Tango	Matt Di Angelo	35	–	–
Cha Cha Cha	Louis Smith	27	Craig Kelly	17
Charleston	Louis Smith	39	Jimi Mistry	27
Foxtrot	Louis Smith	38	Craig Kelly	24
Jive	Louis Smith	31	Craig Kelly	20
Paso Doble	Matt Di Angelo	31	Russell Grant	24
Quickstep	Matt Di Angelo	34	Craig Kelly	21
Rumba	Louis Smith (fusion with tango)	37	Craig Kelly	22
Salsa	Louis Smith; Matt Di Angelo	39	Russell Grant	25
Samba	Louis Smith; Matt Di Angelo	29	Craig Kelly	18
Showdance	Louis Smith	40	–	–
Tango	Louis Smith (fusion with rumba)	37	Craig Kelly	22
Viennese Waltz	Louis Smith	30	Matt Di Angelo	29
Waltz	Matt Di Angelo	40	Jimmy Tarbuck	17

Series	Partner	Place	Average Score
4	Jimmy Tarbuck	12th	17.0
5	Matt Di Angelo	2nd	32.9
6	Phil Daniels	16th	20.0
7	Craig Kelly	9th	21.0
8	Jimi Mistry	10th	28.3
9	Russell Grant	8th	24.3
10	Louis Smith	1st	33.5

In 2005, Cacace appeared as a guest choreographer with Simone to choreograph an unscored group Argentine Tango to introduce the dance style to audiences. The dance was then introduced into the competitive roster so therefore a scored individual dance a year later.

In 2006, Cacace appeared in the fourth series of the BBC's Strictly Come Dancing. Her celebrity dancing partner was comedian Jimmy Tarbuck. However, the couple withdrew after only one show, for medical reasons.

On 1 June 2013, Cacace announced that she and Simone would not be competing in Strictly Come Dancing 2013 so they could work on other shows.

=== Other appearances ===
In January 2012, Cacace appeared on the BBC TV series The Magicians.

Cacace and Simone also have an App called 'Dance with Vincent and Flavia'. Dance with Vincent and Flavia is a free dance tutorial App from which the user can learn the fundamental dance steps and advance into a competent dancer with Vincent and Flavia's help. The App is published by International Celebrity Networks.

== Titles ==
Career titles Cacace has earned from competitions, with her professional partner Simone:

- UK Professional Ten Dance Champions 2002–2006
- UK Professional Showdance Champions 2003–2006
- UK Argentine Tango Champions, 2006
- UK Ballroom Champions
- World and European Ten Dance and Showdance finalists 2002–2006

== Personal life ==
Cacace currently resides in Devon, with her former Strictly Come Dancing partner, Jimi Mistry. She announced on Twitter on 5 January 2013 that they were engaged, and their marriage took place in London on 28 December 2013.
