= The Sonny Side of Chér =

Studio album by Cher
- Released: March 28, 1966
- Recorded: September 1965 – February–March 1966
- Studio: Gold Star, Hollywood
- Genre: Folk rock; folk pop
- Length: 33:35
- Label: Imperial; Liberty; EMI; BGO
- Producer: Sonny Bono

Cher chronology
All I Really Want to Do (1965)	The Sonny Side of Chér (1966)	Chér (1966)

Singles from The Sonny Side of Chér
- 1. "Where Do You Go" Released: September 27, 1965; 2. "Bang Bang (My Baby Shot Me Down)" Released: February 21, 1966

The Sonny Side of Chér is the second studio album by American singer-actress Cher, released on March 28, 1966, by Imperial, shortly after the success of her debut album. Recorded while she was simultaneously charting as part of the duo Sonny & Cher, the album was produced by Sonny Bono.

Musically, the album follows the formula of its predecessor, combining rearranged cover versions with new songs written by Bono. Its track list draws from contemporary folk and pop standards, incorporating influences from French chanson alongside American and international material. Notably, the record includes "Bang Bang (My Baby Shot Me Down)" which became Cher's first solo top-ten hit.

Upon release, The Sonny Side of Chér received mixed critical responsess. Commercially, the album charted in both the United States and the United Kingdom, while the single "Bang Bang (My Baby Shot Me Down)" became one of the most successful songs of Cher's 1960s output.

== Background and production ==
After the success of her previous album, Cher quickly recorded another album. The Sonny Side of Chér was in the chart with the second studio album of Sonny & Cher, The Wondrous World of Sonny & Cher. The album follows the same formula of the previous album with rearranged covers and new songs written by Bono. The Sonny Side of Chér was overall less successful than the previous release, but produced bigger hits than the first album did. It contains Cher's first solo Top Ten hit, the Bono-penned song "Bang Bang (My Baby Shot Me Down)". With "Bang Bang", Cher was definitively settled in the American pop culture. The album also had two songs with French influence, "A Young Girl" and "Our Day Will Come" and Edith Piaf's famous "Milord".

Like her previous album All I Really Want to Do, Cher covered one song written and performed by Bob Dylan, "Like a Rolling Stone". The album also included Tom Jones' "It's Not Unusual", the popular song "Our Day Will Come" and "The Girl from Ipanema". Other covers are "A Young Girl" and "Ol' Man River" (which shows the huge vocal power Cher already had on this early album).

== Singles ==
Two singles were released from this album; both were written by Bono. "Where Do You Go", the album's first single release, was a Dylan-mimic and reached number 25 in the Billboard Hot 100 and number 17 on the Canadian Singles Chart. The second single released was Cher's most successful song of the sixties, "Bang Bang (My Baby Shot Me Down)", which peaked in the US at No. 2 and which was also a hit in the UK Singles Chart at No. 3. The song was covered by Bono in the Sonny & Cher live album Live in Las Vegas Vol. 2, and was later re-recorded for the 1987 studio album Cher.

== CD releases ==
Cher's second successful album of the sixties, it was released on CD in 1992 by EMI together with Cher's first album as a 2fer. In 1995 EMI re-released this 2fer with the album Chér. The last version of the album was released in 2005 only in UK by BGO Records. These editions feature a different track order than the original LP.

== Critical reception ==
Professional ratings
Review scores
Source	Rating
AllMusic	2.5/5 stars
Billboard	Favorable
Record Mirror	4/5 stars

Billboard called the album "well produced", "well performed" and a "fast-moving item". Record Mirror wrote that Cher "sounds better than ever", praising "quite good selections" and noting she performs "Time" "delicately", "raves through 'Milord'", and excels on "A Young Girl", though criticizing "Like a Rolling Stone" as "a silly song for a girl to sing". Cash Box described it as a set of "goodies" spanning "the poetic and folk-rock bags". Record World wrote that the "fine, clever hand" of Sonny is behind the album, praising Cher for performing "charmingly and compellingly" on "Bang Bang".

AllMusic wrote that Sonny Bono's attempt to tinker with the folk-rock formula "ruins everything", leaving the album a "chuckle-inducing curiosity", though noting "good covers of Dylan" and "a couple of Bob Lind tunes", while criticizing its "over the top" arrangements, Cher sounding "game but uncommitted", and ultimately calling that it "is doomed by its lack of heart and inability to rise above the formulaic".

== Commercial performance ==
The Sonny Side of Chér peaked at number 26 on the Billboard 200. The album entered into the chart while The Wondrous World of Sonny & Cher was also charting. The album also entered in the UK Albums Chart and debuted at number 28 in May, and reached its highest position at number eleven, three weeks later. The album remained in the chart for eleven weeks and exited in July. The Sonny Side of Chér was also Cher's last album that entered in the UK Albums chart until her 1987 comeback album Cher (released by Geffen). The Sonny Side of Chér also entered in the Norway albums chart and peaked at No. 17.

== Track listing ==
Side one
No.	Title	Writer(s)	Length
1.	"Bang Bang (My Baby Shot Me Down)"	Sonny Bono	2:40
2.	"A Young Girl (Une enfante)"	Oscar Brown, Jr.; Charles Aznavour; Robert Chauvigny	3:22
3.	"Where Do You Go"	Bono	3:12
4.	"Our Day Will Come"	Bob Hilliard; Mort Garson	2:12
5.	"Elusive Butterfly"	Bob Lind	2:30
6.	"Like a Rolling Stone"	Bob Dylan	3:45

Side two
No.	Title	Writer(s)	Length
1.	"Ol' Man River"	Oscar Hammerstein II; Jerome Kern	2:50
2.	"Come to Your Window"	Lind	2:48
3.	"The Girl from Ipanema"	Vinicius de Moraes; Norman Gimbel; Antônio Carlos Jobim	2:09
4.	"It's Not Unusual"	Gordon Mills; Leslie Reed	2:08
5.	"Time"	Michael Merchant	3:16
6.	"Milord"	Bunny Lewis; Marguerite Monnot; Georges Moustaki	2:43

== Personnel ==
- Cher - lead vocals
- Sonny Bono - record producer
- Harold Battiste - musical arranger
- Larry Levine - sound engineer
- Stan Ross - sound engineer
- Woody Woodward - art direction

No musicians were credited, only: "A very special thanks to some of the greatest musicians in Hollywood for their part in making this album possible"

== Charts ==
=== Weekly charts ===
Weekly chart performance for The Sonny Side of Chér
Chart (1966)	Peak position
Finnish Albums (Suomen virallinen lista)	7
Norwegian Albums (VG-lista)	5
UK Albums (OCC)	11
US Billboard 200	26
US Cash Box Top Pop Albums	27
US Record World Top 100 LP's	15

=== Year-end charts ===
Year-end chart performance for The Sonny Side of Chér
Chart (1966)	Position
US Cash Box Top Pop Albums	87
