= Chér (1966 album) =

Studio album by Cher
- Released: September 5, 1966
- Recorded: 1966
- Studio: Gold Star (Hollywood, California)
- Genre: Pop; folk
- Length: 33:45
- Label: Imperial; Liberty; EMI; BGO
- Producer: Sonny Bono

Cher chronology
The Sonny Side of Chér (1966)	Chér (1966)	With Love, Chér (1967)

Singles from Chér
- 1. "Alfie" Released: July 11, 1966; 2. "I Feel Something in the Air" Released: July 29, 1966; 3. "Sunny" Released: September 16, 1966

Chér is the third studio album by American singer-actress Cher, released on September 5, 1966 by Imperial. Cher collaborates again with Sonny Bono, with Harold Battiste and with Stan Ross. The album is by-and-large a covers album and contains only one song written by Bono. This album was a moderate commercial success, peaking at number 59 on the Billboard 200.

== Album information ==
Chér was released in 1966, produced by Sonny Bono and issued by the Liberty Records subsidiary, Imperial Records.

The album again follows the same formula of the two previous albums, with rearranged covers and new songs written by Bono exclusively for her. There's more French influence in the record and more folk. The only hit in Europe generated from this album was her version of Burt Bacharach's "Alfie" from the Michael Caine movie. Although her version was on the film's soundtrack, it didn't fare nearly as well as the Dionne Warwick version—now considered definitive.

During recording sessions, Cher recorded also three other songs: "She's No Better than Me", released on the B-side of the "Alfie" single, "Ma piano (per non svegliarmi)" and "Nel mio cielo ci sei tu", an Italian version of "I Feel Something in the Air" released on the B-side of "Ma piano (per non svegliarmi)". Though not as successful as the two records preceding it, Chér scored a European number-one hit with "Sunny". "Alfie" and "I Feel Something in the Air" also charted, peaking at #26 in Canada, #32 in the US and #43 in the UK.

In December 2005, this album and Cher's next album With Love, Chér were reissued on one CD called Chér/With Love which featured all the tracks from both.

== Critical reception ==
Cash Box described the record as a "powerpacked album" whose songs were "tailored to the inimitable Cher style". Record World wrote that Cher, described as "music's hottest thrush", "lent her talents to songs by Dylan, Bacharach, Simon, Donovan and hubby Sonny", and highlighted "The Twelfth of Never" and "Sunny". In a contemporary review, Billboard wrote that Cher had "a hot contender here for the top of the LP chart", led by her hit "Alfie" and an "exceptional rendition" of "Sunny".

== Track listing ==
Side one
No.	Title	Writer(s)	Length
1.	"Sunny"	Bobby Hebb	3:06
2.	"Twelfth of Never"	Jerry Livingston; Paul Francis Webster	2:14
3.	"You Don't Have to Say You Love Me"	Pino Donaggio; Vito Pallavicini; Vicki Wickham; Simon Napier-Bell	2:45
4.	"I Feel Something in the Air (Magic in the Air)"	Sonny Bono	3:38
5.	"Will You Love Me Tomorrow"	Gerry Goffin; Carole King	2:55
6.	"Until It's Time for You to Go"	Buffy Sainte-Marie	2:45

Side two
No.	Title	Writer(s)	Length
1.	"Cruel War"	Paul Stookey; Peter Yarrow	3:40
2.	"Catch the Wind"	Donovan	2:13
3.	"The Pied Piper"	Steve Duboff; Artie Kornfield	2:24
4.	"Homeward Bound"	Paul Simon	2:24
5.	"I Want You"	Bob Dylan	2:53
6.	"Alfie"	Burt Bacharach; Hal David	2:48

== Personnel ==
- Cher - lead vocals
- Sonny Bono - producer
- Carol Kaye, Don Peake, Dr. John - guitar
- David Cohen, Mike Post - 12-string guitar
- Lyle Ritz - electric bass guitar
- Cliff Hills - upright bass
- Gabriel Mekler - piano
- Michel Rubini - harpsichord
- Frank Capp - drums
- Gene Estes, Jim Gordon, Jungle Geno - percussion
- George Poole - violin, flute
- Harold Battiste - musical arranger, musical conductor

Technical

- Stan Ross - sound engineer
- Woody Woodward - art direction

== Charts ==
Weekly chart performance for Chér
Chart (1966)	Peak position
US Billboard 200	59
US Cash Box Top Pop Albums	37
US Record World Top 100 LP's	31
