= Where Do You Go (Cher song) =

Single by Cher

from the album The Sonny Side of Cher
- B-side: "See See Rider"
- Released: October 1965
- Length: 3:16
- Label: Imperial
- Songwriter: Salvatore "Sonny" Bono

Cher singles chronology
"All I Really Want to Do" (1965)	"Where Do You Go" (1965)	"Bang Bang (My Baby Shot Me Down)" (1966)

Audio
- Cher – "Where Do You Go" on YouTube

"Where Do You Go" is a song written by Sonny Bono. It was released as the first single by Cher in the later quarter of 1965 for her second album The Sonny Side of Cher. It fell short of the Billboard Hot 100's top 20, but still earned Cher a moderate success, by reaching the Top 40. It was followed by the U.S. #2 smash hit "Bang Bang (My Baby Shot Me Down)" which saw a release early the following year. It was a bigger hit in Canada, where it reached #5 on the singles chart.

Billboard said of the song that "rhythmic folk composition by Sonny can't miss being a smash for Cher" and praised the vocal performance and the "driving beat."

== Charts ==
1965 weekly chart performance for "Where Do You Go"
Chart (1965)	Peak position
Canadian Singles Chart	5
Quebec (ADISQ)	19
US Billboard Hot 100	25
US Cash Box Top 100	32
