= Charlotte Jackson =

English journalist and television presenter

- Born: Charlotte Louise Jackson; 29 June 1978 (age 48); Portsmouth, England
- Occupations: Television presenter; singer; model

Charlotte Louise Jackson (born 29 June 1978) is an English journalist and television presenter who was formerly a presenter on Sky Sports News.

== Biography ==
Although she is from Portsmouth, she is a lifelong supporter of Liverpool as her family came from the city. She spent much of her early years in Wickham, a village just north of Portsmouth.

She was also a singer and backing vocalist for Tony Christie for a TV appearance of his hit, "Is This the Way to Amarillo". She hosted the Barnardos Young Supporters Concert from 2005–2009, and participated in Catfight in 2007, a boxing match in Hammersmith Palais.

She joined Setanta Sports News in 2007. At Sky News, she hosted the 2009 FIFA World Player of the Year Awards Ceremony in Zurich alongside Pedro Pinto.

In 2013, she was a contestant in ITV's celebrity diving show Splash!, where she reached the semi-finals, despite breaking a toe.

She is married to former Fulham, Sunderland and Wales manager Chris Coleman. She announced in June 2014 that they were expecting their first child and a son arrived on 22 December, followed by a daughter in 2016.

In late 2010, Sky Sports commentator Andy Gray and presenter Richard Keys were caught in a furore, when derogatory comments they made about female referees prior to a match were caught by a hot mic. Shortly after, footage emerged of more incidents of Gray engaged in sexist behaviour, this time an inappropriate comment directed at Jackson, and consequently his contract was terminated by Sky.
