= Bang Bang (My Baby Shot Me Down) =

1966 single by Cher

Single by Cher

from the album The Sonny Side of Chér
- B-side: "Needles and Pins"; "Our Day Will Come"
- Released: February 25, 1966
- Recorded: February 11, 1966
- Studio: Gold Star Studios, Los Angeles, California
- Genre: Folk rock
- Length: 2:44
- Label: Imperial
- Songwriter: Sonny Bono
- Producer: Sonny Bono

Cher singles chronology
"Where Do You Go" (1965)	"Bang Bang (My Baby Shot Me Down)" (1966)	"Alfie" (1966)

Audio video
- "Bang Bang (My Baby Shot Me Down)" on YouTube

"Bang Bang (My Baby Shot Me Down)" is the second single by American singer-actress Cher from her second album, The Sonny Side of Chér (1966). It was written by her husband Sonny Bono and released in 1966. It reached No. 3 in the UK Singles Chart and No. 2 on the Billboard Hot 100 for a week (behind "(You're My) Soul and Inspiration" by The Righteous Brothers), eventually becoming one of Cher's biggest-selling singles of the 1960s.

== History ==
The single proved successful, charting high in several countries. It became Cher's first million-selling single and her first top 3 hit in the UK (and her last until "The Shoop Shoop Song (It's in His Kiss)" reached No. 1 in 1991). Critic Tim Sendra, in his album review of The Sonny Side of Cher, gave the song a mixed review: "The only track that has any real zest is the Bono-written novelty 'Bang Bang (My Baby Shot Me Down)', the kind of dramatic song Cher could knock out in her sleep but also a song with no real heart." The reviewer for Cashbox said the song was "inventive" and predicted it would become a "blockbuster" hit. The reviewer praised its "plaintive, blues-soaked" style, as well as the "interesting Gypsy-ish backing".

Cher recorded a rock version of "Bang Bang" for her Platinum-certified comeback album Cher (1987). Produced by Jon Bon Jovi, Richie Sambora and Desmond Child, the song features backing vocals by Jon Bon Jovi and Michael Bolton. It was released as a France-only single in 1988 and received radio airplay in neighboring Portugal. Cher performed this version on her Heart of Stone Tour and on Living Proof: The Farewell Tour and it was played instrumentally on the Dressed to Kill Tour in 2014, Classic Cher in 2017–2020 and the Here We Go Again Tour in 2018–2020.

== Track listing ==
- 1966 US / worldwide 7" single
1. "Bang Bang (My Baby Shot Me Down)" – 2:40
2. "Our Day Will Come" – 2:28
- 1966 (US and Italy variant) 7" single
1. "Bang Bang (My Baby Shot Me Down)" – 2:40
2. "Needles and Pins" – 2:26
- 1987 French 7" single
1. "Bang-Bang" – 3:51
2. "I Found Someone" – 3:42
- 1993 French CD single
1. "Bang-Bang" – 3:54
2. "Whenever You're Near" – 4:05

== Charts ==
=== Weekly charts ===
1966 weekly chart performance for "Bang Bang (My Baby Shot Me Down)"
Chart (1966)	Peak position
Australia (Kent Music Report)	11
Austria (Ö3 Austria Top 40)	6
Belgium (Ultratop 50 Flanders)	9
Belgium (Ultratop 50 Wallonia)	22
Canada Top Singles (RPM)	4
Finland (Suomen virallinen singlelista)	18
Ireland (IRMA)	3
Italian Singles	1
Japanese Singles	5
Netherlands (Single Top 100)	16
Netherlands (Dutch Top 40)	16
New Zealand (Recorded Music NZ)	2
New Zealand (Listener)	2
Norway	4
Quebec (ADISQ)	4
South Africa (Springbok Radio SA Top 20)	10
UK Singles (Official Charts)	3
US Billboard Hot 100	2
West Germany (GfK)	17

=== Year-end charts ===
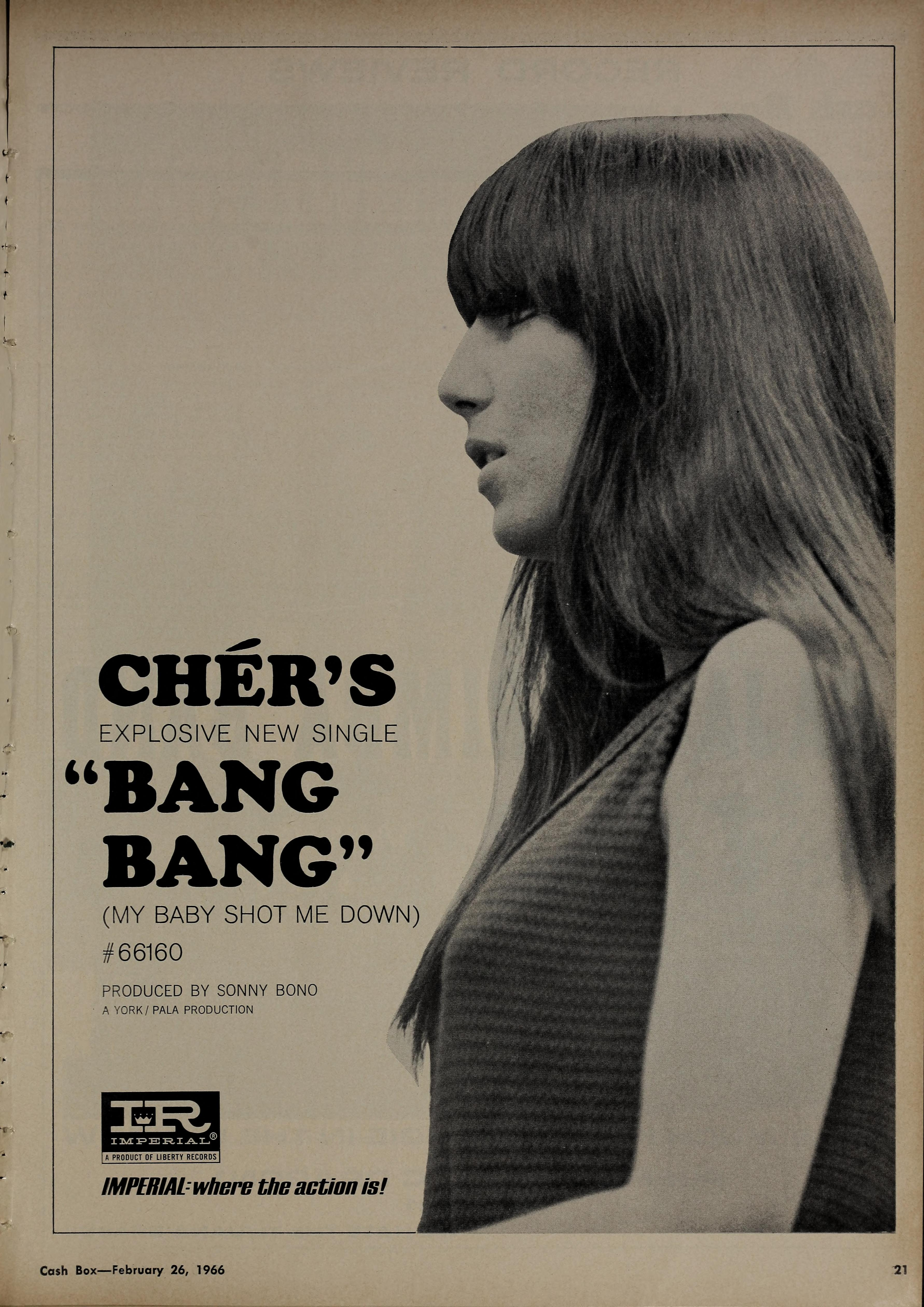
Cashbox advertisement, February 26, 1966

Year-end chart performance for "Bang Bang (My Baby Shot Me Down)"
Chart (1966)	Position
Australian Singles Chart	89
Brazil (Crowley Broadcast Analysis)	46
Japanese Singles	11
South Africa (Springbok Radio SA Top 20)	94
UK Singles (OCC)	53
U.S. Billboard Hot 100	52
US Cash Box Top 100	46
West Germany (Official German Charts)	114

== Other versions ==
Nancy Sinatra recorded one of the best-known covers of the song, for her 1966 album How Does That Grab You? Featuring haunting tremolo guitar played by her arranger, Billy Strange, Sinatra's version had a resurgence in popularity when it was used by Quentin Tarantino over the opening credits of his 2003 film Kill Bill Volume 1. In the sequence preceding the credits, Tarantino created a literal, bloody interpretation of the song's chorus and its third verse, about a wedding day. The song also appears on the film's soundtrack album. Sinatra's version was sampled and featured on the 2005 electro house track "Shot You Down" by Audio Bullys, which peaked at No. 3 in the United Kingdom and No. 20 in Australia. A reissue single of Sinatra's original track in 2014 also charted in France at No. 97.

Following soon after the release by Cher in 1966, the song would become popular across Europe – in versions released as singles by Cher, Sinatra, Petula Clark and other artists, across several countries and in different languages. Singer Sheila's cover of the song in French – released as "Bang-bang" – reached No. 1 on the French charts in July 1966. A cover version sung in Italian by Dalida reached No. 1 in Italy in 1966 and remained on the chart for two months, earning her a gold record. It later appeared on her 1967 album Dalida. Yugoslav singer Đorđe Marjanović also covered the song on his 1967 EP "Devojke".

Vanilla Fudge, an American band known for slow, extended heavy rock arrangements of contemporary hit songs, included "Bang Bang" on their eponymous album released in 1967.

Terry Reid released the song on his Epic Records album “Bang Bang You're Terry Reid” on October 30, 1968. Betty Chung also released a version in 1968, with lyrics in Chinese.

Bengali-Pakistani pop singer Alamgir uses the melody of the song in his 1983 release "Mere Lafzo Ki Mehkar Tu" ("You are the fragrance of my words"). Sung in Urdu, the track features a middle section sung to the tune of the Mary Hopkin hit "Those Were the Days." Alamgir also recorded an alternate version with "Bang Bang" in English and "Mere Lafzo" in Urdu; and he is featured on another version with Pakistani pop singer Tina Sani.

External videos
- "Bang Bang (My Baby Shot Me Down)" (live from Jazz at Lincoln Center) by Lady Gaga on YouTube

Lady Gaga performed "Bang Bang (My Baby Shot Me Down)" in July 2014 at Jazz at Lincoln Center, for the TV special Cheek to Cheek Live!. The live recording was made available as an iTunes/Apple Music bonus track with her collaborative album with Tony Bennett, Cheek to Cheek. Gaga's rendition of "Bang Bang" debuted at #1 on Billboard's Jazz Digital Songs Chart and was well received by critics. The singer would later include the song in her residency shows and tour performances.

David Guetta released a version of the song in 2014 as the single "Shot Me Down". Alternating between Sinatra's musical arrangement in the verses (sung by Skylar Grey) and driving EDM instrumental breaks, the single was certified gold and platinum in multiple countries.

Paul Weller covered the song in 2000 on the B side of "He's the Keeper" and on his 2003 rarities collection Fly on the Wall: B Sides & Rarities.

The 2007 re-release of the Bonzo Dog Doo-Dah Band's 1968 album The Doughnut in Granny's Greenhouse (released as Urban Spaceman in the U.S.) included "Bang Bang" as a bonus track.

Caroline Polachek recorded a funky, Jamaican dancehall inspired upbeat cover of "Bang Bang" for the soundtrack of the 2022 film Minions: The Rise of Gru. This version has a chorus inspired by the dancehall song "Bam Bam". The movie also features a version in Chinese by G.E.M., and several other modern covers of older songs.

English experimental act Coil released two covers of the song, a solo guitar version as "Mono" on Worship the Glitch, and a live piano and voice version on Selvaggina, Go Back into the Woods.
