= Sunny (Bobby Hebb song) =

1963 soul jazz standard

- Side A of the US single

Single by Bobby Hebb

from the album Sunny
- B-side: "Bread"
- Released: June 1966
- Recorded: February 21, 1966
- Studio: Bell Sound (New York City)
- Genre: Soul jazz; pop
- Length: 2:44
- Label: Philips
- Songwriter: Bobby Hebb
- Producer: Jerry Ross

Bobby Hebb singles chronology
| "Sunny" (1966) | "A Satisfied Mind" (1966) |

Official audio
- "Sunny" on YouTube

"Sunny" is a soul jazz standard written by the American singer and songwriter Bobby Hebb in 1963. It is one of the most performed and recorded popular songs, with hundreds of versions released (BMI lists "Sunny" No. 25 in its "Top 100 songs of the century".) and its chord progression influencing later songs.

== Background and composition ==
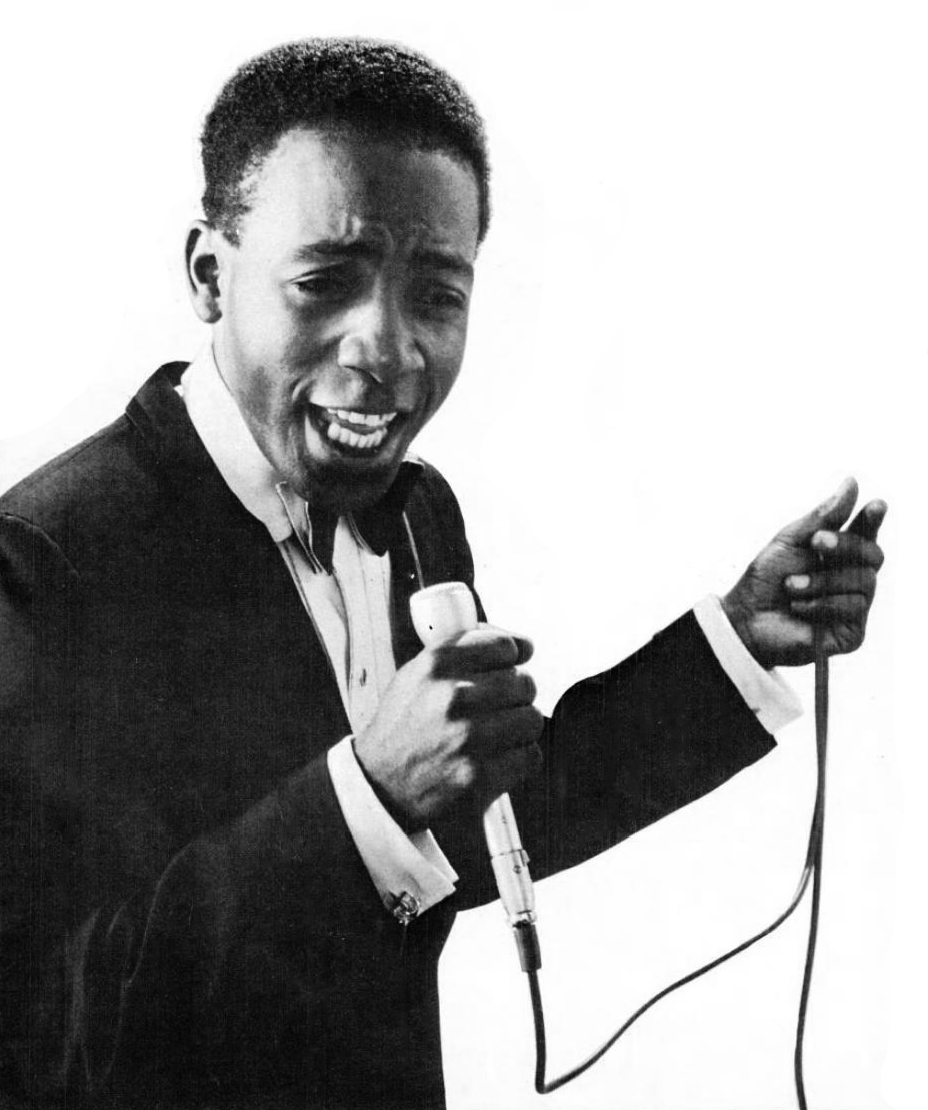
Bobby Hebb, 1966

Hebb's parents, William and Ovalla Hebb, were both blind musicians. Hebb and his older brother Harold performed as a song-and-dance duo in Nashville, beginning when Bobby was three and Harold was nine. Hebb performed on a TV show hosted by country music record producer Owen Bradley.

Hebb wrote the song after his older brother, Harold, was stabbed to death outside a Nashville nightclub. Hebb was devastated by the event and many critics say it inspired the lyrics and tune. According to Hebb, he merely wrote the song as an expression of a preference for a "sunny" disposition over a "lousy" disposition following the murder of his brother.

Events influenced Hebb's songwriting, but his melody, crossing over into R&B (#3 on U.S. R&B chart) and Pop (#2 on U.S. Pop chart), together with the optimistic lyrics, came from the artist's desire to express that one should always "look at the bright side". Hebb has said about "Sunny":

All my intentions were to think of happier times and pay tribute to my brother – basically looking for a brighter day – because times were at a low. After I wrote it, I thought "Sunny" just might be a different approach to what Johnny Bragg was talking about in "Just Walkin' in the Rain".

=== Chord progression's legacy ===
Its sixteen-bar form starts with two repeats of a four-bar phrase starting on the song's E minor tonic i chord followed by a iii^{7}–VI and a ii–V^{7} in the last bar to return to the first i chord:

𝄆 E^{m7} 𝄀 G^{7} 𝄀 C^{maj7} 𝄀 F♯^{m7} B^{7} 𝄇

The third four-bar phrase's last bar is substituted with F^{7} (the tritone sub of the B^{7} dominant chord):

𝄀 E^{m7} 𝄀 G^{7} 𝄀 C^{maj7} 𝄀 F^{7} 𝄀

The fourth and final four-bar phrase is a ii–V^{7}–i that settles on the song's tonic:

𝄀 F♯^{m7} 𝄀 B^{7} 𝄀 E^{m} 𝄀 𝄎 𝄂

Elements of this "Sunny" chord progression are found in some later jazz and pop songs, notably:

- "Red Clay" (title track of Freddie Hubbard's 1970 album Red Clay) loops the "Sunny" progression's first four bars for soloing (but modifies the first V^{7}–I into a full ii–V^{7}–I and modifies the ii–V^{7} in the last bar into a ii^{ø}–V^{7})
- "If You Want Me to Stay" (from Sly and the Family Stone's 1973 album Fresh)
- "Don't You Worry 'bout a Thing" (from Stevie Wonder's 1973 album Innervisions)
- "Angela" (the theme song from the TV series Taxi by Bob James and released in his 1978 album Touchdown)
- "Electric Lady" (from Janelle Monáe's 2014 studio album The Electric Lady)
- "Just the Two of Us" (by Bill Withers, William Salter, and Ralph MacDonald released in 1981 as a single recorded by Grover Washington Jr.) has a double-time reordering of the "Sunny" progression's first four bars. Subvariants of this progression can be found, for example, in:
  - "Thank U, Next" (from Ariana Grande's 2019 album Thank U, Next) can be thought of as a half-time variant.

== Bobby Hebb versions ==
=== 1966 recording ===
The personnel on the Bobby Hebb recording included Joe Shepley, Burt Collins on trumpet, Micky Gravine on trombone, Artie Kaplan and Joe Grimaldi on sax, Artie Butler on piano, Joe Renzetti and Al Gorgoni on guitar, Paul (PB) Brown and Joe Macho on bass, Al Rogers on drums and George Devens on percussion. The song was recorded while the session was in overtime; many of the studio musicians booked for that date had to leave early for other recording sessions. Joe Renzetti was the arranger. Its form modulates up a half step every cycle after the second cycle and ends with a looped tag.

"Sunny" was originally part of an 18-song demo recorded by producer Jerry Ross, also famous for Spanky and Our Gang, Keith's "98.6" and "Apples, Peaches, Pumpkin Pie" by Jay & the Techniques (Hebb was offered this song but didn't want to be considered a novelty act and let the song go to Jay Proctor).

"Sunny" was recorded at Bell Sound Studios in New York City and released as a single in 1966. It met with immediate success, which resulted in Hebb touring in 1966 with the Beatles. The song peaked at No. 2 on the Billboard Hot 100 chart in late August 1966, behind "Summer in the City", by The Lovin' Spoonful.

American TV series Soul! in 1971 had a live duo video with Ron Carter on electric bass that starts with a rubato guitar introduction followed by four loops of the "James Bond" chord progression (which is also used for the final tonic of the chord progression) before starting the main vocal form. It ends with a long vamp which includes a bass solo.

=== Charts ===
==== Weekly charts ====
| Chart (1966) | Peak position |
|---|---|
| Canada RPM Top Singles | 2 |
| Japanese Singles Chart | 86 |
| Netherlands | 2 |
| New Zealand (Listener) | 16 |
| South Africa (Springbok) | 7 |
| UK Singles Chart | 12 |
| US Billboard Hot 100 | 2 |
| US R&B Singles (Billboard) | 3 |
| US Cash Box Top 100 | 1 |

==== Year-end charts ====
| Chart (1966) | Position |
|---|---|
| Dutch Singles Chart | 31 |
| US Billboard Hot 100 | 27 |
| US Cash Box Top 100 | 3 |

==== Certifications ====
| Region | Certification | Certified units/sales |
|---|---|---|
| United Kingdom (BPI) | Silver | 200,000^{‡} |
| United States (RIAA) | Gold | 1,000,000^{^} |
^{^} Shipments figures based on certification alone.^{‡} Sales+streaming figures based on certification alone.

=== 1976 recording ===
"Sunny '76"
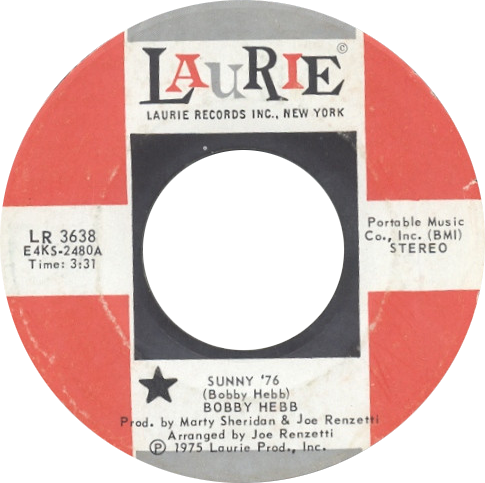
- Side A of the 1975 US single

Single by Bobby Hebb
- B-side: "Proud Soul Heritage"
- Released: 1975
- Genre: Disco
- Length: 3:31
- Label: Laurie (US)
- Songwriter: Bobby Hebb
- Producers: Joe Renzetti & Marty Sheriden

"Sunny '76'" is a reharmonized disco take on Bobby Hebb's song. Like the original 1966 version, it features Hebb; however, an updated disco beat was implemented with an eye to having it played in discos around the world. This version was arranged by Joe Renzetti, who also arranged the original record.

The 7-inch single was released in late 1975. The B-side featured another song of Hebb's called "Proud Soul Heritage". The song managed to become a minor hit, reaching No. 94 on the R&B chart.

== Mieko Hirota version ==
Before Bobby Hebb recorded his own version of the song it was recorded by Japanese singer Mieko Hirota, backed by the Billy Taylor Trio. This version was released on her album Miko in New York in January 1966, just one month before Hebb would release his own recording of the song.

== Cher version ==
"Sunny"

Single by Cher

from the album Chér
- B-side: "She's No Better Than Me" "Will You Love Me Tomorrow"
- Released: September, 1966
- Length: 3:10
- Label: Imperial
- Songwriter: Bobby Hebb
- Producer: Sonny Bono

Cher singles chronology
| "I Feel Something in the Air" (1966) | "Sunny" (1966) | "Behind the Door" (1966) |

American singer and actress Cher recorded the song for her third solo album Chér, released in September 1966. "Sunny" was released as the third single off the album for the European and Asian markets, achieving success mostly in Scandinavian countries, as well as in Brazil. It is considered to be a tribute to her husband at the time, Sonny Bono.

=== Charts ===
==== Weekly charts ====
1966 weekly chart performance for "Sunny" by Cher
| Chart (1966) | Peak position |
|---|---|
| Brazilian Singles Chart | 5 |
| Danish Singles Chart | 8 |
| Finnish Singles Chart | 9 |
| Netherlands (Cash Box Holland) | 1 |
| Netherlands (Dutch Top 40) | 2 |
| Netherlands (Single Top 100) | 2 |
| Norwegian Singles Chart | 1 |
| Swedish Singles Chart | 3 |
| UK Singles Chart | 32 |

==== Year-end charts ====
Year-end chart performance for "Sunny" by Cher
| Chart (1966) | Position |
|---|---|
| Dutch Singles Chart | 31 |

== Boney M. version ==
"Sunny"

Single by Boney M.

from the album Take the Heat off Me
- B-side: "New York City"
- Released: 1976
- Genre: Eurodisco
- Length: 4:01
- Label: Hansa (FRG); Atlantic (UK); Atco (U.S.)
- Songwriter: Bobby Hebb
- Producer: Frank Farian

Boney M. singles chronology
| "Daddy Cool" (1976) | "Sunny" (1976) | "Ma Baker" (1977) |

Audio video
- "Boney M. - Sunny (Official Audio)" on YouTube

German Eurodisco group Boney M. recorded the song for their 1976 debut album, Take the Heat off Me, produced by Frank Farian and arranged by Stefan Klinkhammer. Following their breakthrough single "Daddy Cool", "Sunny" topped the German charts and reached the top ten in many other countries.

The single's B-side was "New York City", a reworked version of Gilla's (another Farian artist) 1976 hit single "Tu es!" and its English version "Why Don't You Do It", which had an intro borrowed from the Boney M. album track "Help Help". This was issued in some territories instead of "Baby Do You Wanna Bump" on "Take the Heat off Me".

The track was remixed and reissued several times in 1988, 1999, 2000 and 2015, and was sampled by Mark Ronson for his 2003 song "Ooh Wee" and by Boogie Pimps on their 2004 version. While Liz Mitchell sang the original lead vocals on Boney M.'s version, original member Maizie Williams recorded a solo version in 2006. The original version was also featured in the Umbrella Academy season 2 soundtrack and was later featured in the 2026 film Melania. The 2000 remix appeared on Boney M.'s remix album 20th Century Hits.

=== Charts ===
==== Weekly charts ====
1976–77 weekly chart performance for "Sunny" by Boney M.
| Chart (1976–1977) | Peak position |
|---|---|
| Argentina | 34 |
| Australia (Kent Music Report) | 36 |
| Austria (Ö3 Austria Top 40) | 1 |
| Belgium (Ultratop 50 Flanders) | 1 |
| Belgium (Ultratop 50 Wallonia) | 1 |
| Finland (Suomen virallinen lista) | 6 |
| France (IFOP) | 1 |
| Ireland (IRMA) | 4 |
| Italy (Musica e dischi) | 21 |
| Netherlands (Dutch Top 40) | 1 |
| Netherlands (Single Top 100) | 1 |
| New Zealand (Recorded Music NZ) | 17 |
| Norway (VG-lista) | 4 |
| Sweden (Sverigetopplistan) | 11 |
| Switzerland (Schweizer Hitparade) | 2 |
| UK Singles (Official Charts) | 3 |
| West Germany (GfK) | 1 |

2025 weekly chart performance for "Sunny" by Boney M.
| Chart (2025) | Peak position |
|---|---|
| Czech Republic Airplay (ČNS IFPI) R3hab remix | 3 |

==== Monthly charts ====
Monthly chart performance for "Sunny" by Boney M.
| Chart (1977) | Peak position |
|---|---|
| Soviet Union International Songs (MK) | 9 |

==== Year-end charts ====
Year-end chart performance for "Sunny" by Boney M.
| Chart (1977) | Rank |
|---|---|
| Austria (Ö3 Austria Top 40) | 12 |
| Belgium (Ultratop 50 Flanders) | 5 |
| Netherlands (Dutch Top 40) | 20 |
| Netherlands (Single Top 100) | 25 |
| West Germany (Official German Charts) | 12 |

Year-end chart performance for the 2000 remix of "Sunny" by Boney M.
| Chart (2000) | Rank |
|---|---|
| European Airplay (Border Breakers) | 99 |

== Certifications and sales ==
| Region | Certification | Certified units/sales |
|---|---|---|
| France | — | 500,000 |
| New Zealand (RMNZ) | Gold | 15,000^{‡} |
| United Kingdom 1977 release | — | 250,000 |
| United Kingdom (BPI) | Silver | 200,000^{‡} |
^{‡} Sales+streaming figures based on certification alone.

== Other notable cover versions ==
- Asha Puthli and The Surfers released a cover version in 1968.
- James Brown covered the song on his 1969 album Gettin' Down to It.
- In 1969, American rock band Classics IV covered the song for their third album, Traces.
- Luis Miguel covered the song in Spanish in 1987, from his album, Soy Como Quiero Ser.
- Christophe Willem covered the song in 2006 (#3 in France, #9 in Belgium (Wallonia), #17 in Switzerland)
- American singer and songwriter Billie Eilish and her brother Finneas O'Connell covered the song as part of the TV special, One World: Together at Home
- Swiss-American electroswing project Intended Immigration released a cover of the song in 2024 on multiple music streaming platforms.
- The American rapper Jalen Santoy interpolates the melody in his song “Foreplay.”
