= Greatest Hits (Cher album) =

Greatest hits album by Cher
- Released: October 1974; October 23, 1990 (re-release)
- Recorded: 1971–74
- Genre: Pop; rock
- Length: 31:33
- Label: MCA
- Producer: Snuff Garrett

Cher chronology
Dark Lady (1974)	Greatest Hits (1974)	Stars (1975)

Alternative cover
- 1990 CD release

Greatest Hits is the third greatest hits compilation by American singer-actress Cher, released in October 1974 by MCA Records. The album was released to close Cher's contract with MCA, her record company since 1971. This release follows the greatest hits albums Golden Greats (1968) and Superpack (1972). The album peaked at 152 on the Billboard 200 chart.

== Critical reception ==
Professional ratings
Review scores
Source	Rating
AllMusic	1/1 disc
Christgau's Record Guide	B+
The Rolling Stone Album Guide	2.5/5 stars

Billboard highlighted that Cher is "a fine singer" and "has proven one of the most consistent hitmakers", with songs that "are not only good but which vary from rock to ballads to that vague in-between". Cash Box wrote that the album is "a collection that really demonstrates how much Cher has meant to the industry and the millions of fans".

According to Robert Christgau, Cher's "biggest hits [are] irresistible" and that she is "at least as authentic as Tammy Wynette". He highlighted the "great Swarthy Trilogy" ("Gypsys, Tramps & Thieves", "Half-Breed", and "Dark Lady") as proof of a collection "as vulgar as any in the post-Beatles era". The Rolling Stone Album Guide described that "those three glorious howlers [the "great Swarthy Trilogy"] can't rescue Cher's Greatest Hits from the gaping clutches of dispassionate shlock like 'The Way of Love'".

Stephen Thomas Erlewine of AllMusic gave the album a filled circle, a key symbol which represents "the best this artist has to offer".

== Track listing ==
Side one
No.	Title	Writer(s)	Original album	Length
1.	"Dark Lady"	John Durrill	Dark Lady, 1974	3:26
2.	"The Way of Love"	Al Stillman; Jack Dieval; Michel Revgauche	Chér, 1971	2:30
3.	"Don't Hide Your Love"	Neil Sedaka; Howard Greenfield	Foxy Lady, 1972	2:50
4.	"Half-Breed"	Mary Dean; Al Capps	Half-Breed, 1973	2:42
5.	"Train of Thought"	Alan O'Day	Dark Lady	2:34

Side two
No.	Title	Writer(s)	Original album	Length
1.	"Gypsys, Tramps & Thieves"	Bob Stone	Chér	2:36
2.	"I Saw a Man and He Danced with His Wife"	Durrill	Dark Lady	3:13
3.	"Carousel Man"	Durrill	Half-Breed	3:02
4.	"Living in a House Divided"	Tom Bahler	Foxy Lady	2:57
5.	"Melody"	Cliff Crofford; Thomas L. Garrett	Half-Breed	2:34
Total length:				28:24

1990 Re-release
No.	Title	Writer(s)	Original album	Length
11.	"Dixie Girl"	Durrill	Dark Lady	3:22
Total length:				31:46

== Personnel ==
- Cher - lead vocals
- Snuff Garrett - record producer
- Al Capps - arrangement assistance
- Michel Rubini - arrangement assistance
- John Engstead - photography

== Charts ==
Weekly chart performance for Greatest Hits
Chart (1974–75)	Peak position
Australian Albums (Kent Music Report)	100
US Billboard 200	152
US Top Pop Albums (Cash Box)	121
US Top Albums (Record World)	144
