= Lost Gonzo Band =

The Lost Gonzo Band
- Genres: Country rock, progressive country
- Years active: 1972-present

The Lost Gonzo Band was an American country rock and progressive country band that was founded in 1972. The band toured and recorded with other musicians in Texas, including Jerry Jeff Walker, Michael Martin Murphey, and Ray Wylie Hubbard. They were the musicians on such albums as Murphey's Geronimo's Cadillac, Cosmic Cowboy Souvenir, and Jerry Jeff's Viva Terlingua. The original members of the band were Bob Livingston, Gary P. Nunn, John Inmon, Kelly Dunn, Tomas Ramirez and Donny Dolan. Over the years, the band has also included Paul Pearcy, Craig D. Hillis, Herbert Steiner, Mike Holleman, Michael McGeary, Bobby Smith, Lloyd Maines, Radoslav Lorković, and Riley Osbourn.

The Lost Gonzo Band released three albums in the 1970s: Lost Gonzo Band (1975) and Thrills (1976) on MCA Records, and Signs of Life (1977) on Capitol Records. The band appeared on the PBS program Austin City Limits in 1976, 1978, and 1986. In the 1990s, the band recorded two CDs for Vireo Records: Rendezvous in 1992 and Hands of Time in 1995. Demon Records, a company based in England, released a compilation CD of the first two MCA records entitled, Dead Armadillos in 1998. Reviewing The Lost Gonzo Band in 1975, Village Voice critic Robert Christgau wrote:

"Jerry Jeff Walker's backup band transcends its own roots to offer the best evidence to date for Austin's rep as the last refuge of the hippie visionary. The record will probably stand as the best by a new group this year; side one is virtually unflawed; and Gary Nunn's 'Money' reminds me of Peter Townshend's 'Tattoo' in its understated rock and roll eloquence."

All of the members of the original band still have active music careers and occasionally reunite for concerts. Under the direction of manager, D Foster, The Lost Gonzo Band returned to the stage for the first time in nine years for a sold out show at Gruene Hall October 22, 2021. The lineup included original members Gary P Nunn on guitar, Bob Livingston on bass, John Inmon on lead guitar and Steady Freddie Krc on drums. Texas musicians Steve Layne on guitar and David Webb on keyboards rounded out the group.

== Discography ==
- The Lost Gonzo Band (MCA Records); 1975
- Thrills (MCA Records); 1976
- Signs of Life (Capitol Records); 1977
- Rendezvous (Vireo); 1992
- Hands of Time (Vireo); 1995
- Dead Armadillos (Demon Records); 1998
