= Bob Livingston (musician) =

American singer-songwriter

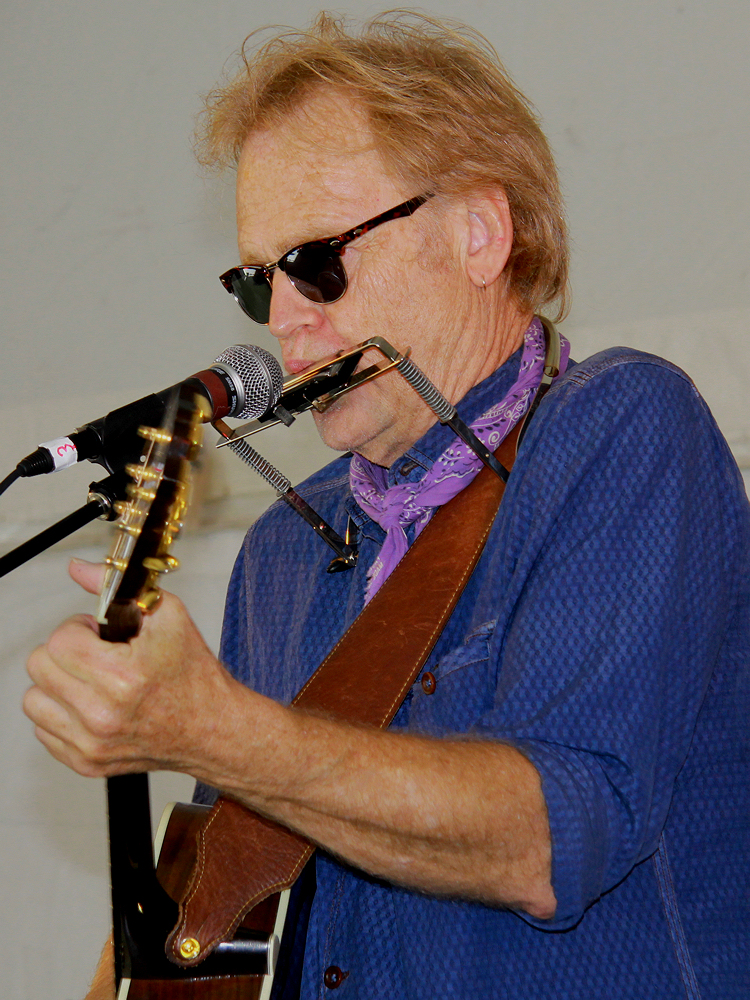
- Livingston performing in 2011

Background information
- Born: Robert Lynn Livingston; November 26, 1948 (age 77)
- Origin: San Antonio, Texas, U.S.
- Genres: Country, progressive country, Americana, folk
- Occupations: Singer-songwriter, musician
- Instruments: Vocals, guitar, bass, piano
- Years active: 1970s–present
- Labels: Capitol, MCA, Vireo, New Wilderness, Howlin' Dog
- Website: boblivingstonmusic.com

Bob Livingston (born Robert Lynn Livingston November 26, 1948) is an American singer-songwriter, guitarist, bass player, and a founding member of The Lost Gonzo Band. Livingston was a key figure in the Cosmic Cowboy, progressive country and outlaw country movements that distinguished the Austin, Texas music scene in the 1970s. Over the years, Bob Livingston has gained a reputation as a band leader, solo artist, session musician and sideman in folk, Americana and country music. He has toured without stop for 47 years, and is one of the most experienced and world traveled musicians in all of Texas music. Livingston's CD, Gypsy Alibi, released by New Wilderness Records in 2011, won the "Album of the Year" at the Texas Music Awards. In January 2016, Livingston was inducted into the Texas Music Legends Hall of Fame in 2016 and into the West Texas Music Walk of Fame in 2018. Howlin' Dog Records released Livingston's latest CD, Up The Flatland Stairs, January 10, 2018.

== Early life ==
Livingston was born in San Antonio, Texas, but was raised in Lubbock. By the mid-1960s, he was active on the Lubbock music scene that was blossoming at the time along with several other Texas music artists such as Jimmy Dale Gilmore, Joe Ely, Butch Hancock, Terry Allen, Jesse Taylor and David Halley. Livingston sharpened his skills as a guitarist and singer while attending Lubbock High and Texas Tech University. In 1968, he opened a folk club in Lubbock called The Attic, and shortly afterwards left Lubbock to pursue his own career in music.

== American music career ==
Livingston left Lubbock in 1969 and moved to Red River, New Mexico. There, he met a folk group called Three Faces West, whose members included Texas artist Ray Wylie Hubbard, Rick Fowler and Wayne Kidd. While playing in Aspen, Colorado in 1970, Livingston was discovered by talent scout and artist agent, Randy Fred, and was signed to Capitol Records. After meeting fellow Texas musician Michael Murphey in California, Livingston moved to Wrightwood, California and collaborated in a songwriting venture with Murphey, forming a music publishing company called Mountain Music Farm with other songwriters Roger Miller and Guy Clark. Livingston joined Michael Murphey's band playing bass, touring and recording together on Murphey's albums Geronimo's Cadillac and Cosmic Cowboy Souvenir.

By 1971, Livingston had relocated to Austin, Texas and was playing in a band that switched between Michael Murphey and Jerry Jeff Walker. Eventually, Murphey and Walker's interchangeable band condensed into their own group, called The Lost Gonzo Band. With Murphey and Walker, The Lost Gonzo Band helped bring about the progressive country genre, and along with the "redneck rock" and outlaw country movements, helpred define a distinct "Austin Sound". Livingston and the Lost Gonzo Band lent their talents to Jerry Jeff Walker for his seminal album Viva Terlingua, among many other records in Walker's career. The Lost Gonzo Band recorded three nationally released albums with Capitol Records and MCA. The Lost Gonzo band returned for shows in 2021 and 2022.

== Songwriting success ==
Livington's songs have appeared in The Lost Gonzo Band's albums, his solo records, and in Jerry Jeff Walker's albums throughout Walker's career. Songs for Walker include "Public Domain" (1975 Ridin' High) (co-written with Gary P. Nunn), "Head Full of Nothin'" (co-written with Rick Fowler), and "It's a Good Night for Singing" (1976 It's a Good Night for Singing), "Roll on Down the Road" (1977 A Man Must Carry On), "Bittersweet" (1981 Reunion), "Gonzo Compadres" (1993 Viva Luckenbach), "Life's Too Short" (1996 Scamp), "Wanted for Love" co-written with Lane Bybee (1998 Cowboy Boots and Bathing Suits).

In 2004, American rap artist Lloyd Banks of G-Unit recorded a song titled "Warrior" on his debut album The Hunger for More. The rapper's song contained a music sample of "Hold On", a song written by Livingston and Ray Wylie Hubbard and recorded by the Lost Gonzo Band but never formally released (but it was released by McKendree Spring on their 1975 album, Get Me to the Country). "Warrior" reached No. 1 on the Billboard 200 charts and went platinum.

Livingston's song "Love Cannot Be Broken" was in the soundtrack of Nobelity- a documentary about the world as seen through the eyes of various Nobel laureates, directed and produced by Turk Pipkin. 2014 saw two recordings of Livingston's song "On A Dream With You" by Texas artists, Walt and Tina Wilkins, on their new "Be Mine" CD and by beloved Texas turned Santa Fe singer/song stylist, Bill Hearne, on his latest CD, "All That's Real."

"Cowgirl's Lullaby", co-written by Livingston and Andy Wilkinson was featured in the independent film, Barracuda produced in Austin 2017. It was also recorded by Wilkinson and appears on Livingston's new CD, "Up The Flatland Stairs."

== International music career ==
Livingston has toured abroad since 1982 playing in the UK, Switzerland, Norway, Finland, France, Canada and Mexico. Beginning in 1987, Livingston began a series of music tours sponsored by the U.S. State Department. Acting as an ambassador of American music, he has been sent repeatedly to over 25 different countries throughout the Middle East, Africa, and Asia, with an aim to promote goodwill and cross-cultural understanding through musical exchange. Livingston has toured Yemen, Bahrain, Oman, Syria, Kuwait, Qatar, India, Pakistan, Sri Lanka, Bangladesh, Vietnam, Thailand, Morocco, Tunisia and Angola, among others. These tours began as a solo act, but eventually included such musicians as long-time associate and guitarist John Inmon, fiddler Richard Bowden, and Livingston's son, guitarist and composer, Tucker Livingston. Livingston and his son gave performances and workshops on the art of guitar playing, songwriting craft, and a history of Texas music and folklore. The Livingstons regularly invited local musicians onstage to collaborate with their indigenous instruments. Editing and pre-production of a documentary film of these travels are currently in the works. Livingston has played and collaborated with groups as diverse as Nepal's, Sur Sudha, The Royal Omani Orchestra, with Ood players in the Middle East, Geisha singers in Vietnam, sitar and tabla players in India and Angola drums and choir ensembles.

== Texas Music International (TMI) and Cowboys and Indians ==
In 2000, Livingston created, Texas Music International, an organization dedicated to bringing different musics of the world together for human and cultural harmony. His first venture was to create a multi-cultural group of musicians from Texas and India called Cowboys & Indians. Cowboys & Indians is supported by the Texas Commission on the Arts and the Economic Development Department of Austin. They give public performances and educational workshops and performances in Texas schools and theaters. Mixed instrumentation, music and cultural lore fuse with Native American, Texas folk and Indian themes that include Bharatanatyam dance, Native American flute and story song, Hindu mythology and cowboy yodeling. Based in Austin, members of Cowboys & Indians have included Bradley Kopp, Oliver Rajamani, Richard Bowden, Tucker Livingston, singer Nagavalli, and Bharatnatyam dancer Anu Naimpally.

== Recent ventures ==
Livingston's discography spans beyond progressive country, singer-songwriter and rock music to such myriad recordings as film music for The Texas Chain Saw Massacre, environmental and peace activist albums, and a children's record on A Gentle Wind called, Open The Window. During his career, Bob has performed with a long list of musicians: Jerry Jeff Walker, Michael Martin Murphey, Ray Wylie Hubbard, Willie Nelson, Willis Alan Ramsey, Leon Russell, and Garth Brooks. He has acted as Chairman of the Austin Music Commission, and serves on the board of directors at the Texas Music Museum. In 2009, Bob Livingston completed another tour sponsored by the U.S. State Department to France, Switzerland and several nations in Africa and in February 2017 played in Karachi, Pakistan. He currently lives in Austin and continues his work with Cowboys & Indians, The Lost Gonzo Band and on his solo career. Livingston's newest CD, Gypsy Alibi was co-produced by Livingston and Lloyd Maines and released on January 27, 2011, on New Wilderness Records. On July 9, 2011, Gypsy Alibi, won "Album of the Year" at the Texas Music Awards. Livingston's latest CD Up The Flatland Stairs, a collection of songs for Howlin' Dog Records, is set to be released in the summer of 2017.

== As author ==
Livingston's book Gypsy Alibi from Texas Tech University Press about his life and travels through the lens of his music career was published in 2025. It won the Beverly Lowry Award for Best First Book of Nonfiction from the Texas Institute of Letters in 2026. https://texasinstituteofletters.org/wp-content/uploads/2026/03/Press-Release-2026-contest-winners-1.pdf

== Discography ==
=== Solo ===
- Waking Up (Wilderness); 1981
- Signs of Life (Wilderness); 1988
- Open the Window (Gentle Wind); 1996
- Mahatma Gandhi & Sitting Bull (Vireo); 2003
- Everything Is All Right (TMI); 2004
- Cowboys & Indians (Vireo); 2007
- Original Spirit (Vireo); 2008
- Gypsy Alibi (New Wilderness Records); 2011
- Bob Livingston at the Kerrville Folk Festival (FestivaLink); 2011
- Up The Flatland Stairs (Howlin' Dog Records); 2018

=== With The Lost Gonzo Band ===
- The Lost Gonzo Band (MCA); 1972
- Thrills (MCA); 1976
- Signs of Life (Capitol); 1978
- Rendezvous (Vireo); 1991
- Hands of Time (Vireo); 1995
- Dead Armadillos (Demon/Edsel); 1998

=== With Jerry Jeff Walker ===
- Jerry Jeff Walker (MCA); 1972
- Viva Terlingua! (MCA); 1973
- Walker's Collectibles (MCA); 1974
- Ridin' High (MCA); 1975
- It's a Good Night for Singin' (MCA); 1976
- A Man Must Carry On (MCA); 1977
- Great Gonzos (MCA); 1991
- Navaho Rug (Rycodisk); 1991
- Hill Country Rain (Rycodisk); 1992
- Viva Luckenbach (Rycodisk); 1993
- Christmas Gonzo Style (Rycodisk); 1994
- Night After Night (Tried 'n True); 1995
- Scamp (Tried 'n True); 1996
- Cowboy Boots and Bathing Suits (Tried 'n True); 1997
- Lone Wolf: The Best of Jerry Jeff Walker (Elektra); 1998
- Gypsy Songman (Tried 'n True); 1999
- Gonzo Stew (Tried 'n True); 2001
- Too Old to Change (Tried ' True) 2003
- It's A Good Night For Singin' & Contrary To Ordinary Plus (Raven); 2013

=== With Michael Martin Murphey ===
- Geronimo's Cadillac (A&M); 1972
- Cosmic Cowboy Souvenir (A&M); 1973

=== With Ray Wylie Hubbard ===
- Something About the Night (Renegade); 1979
- Loco Gringo's Lament (Dejadisc); 1994

=== With Bobby Bridger ===
- Seekers of the Fleece (Golden Egg); 1975
- Ballad of the West (Golden Egg); 2001
- Complete Works (Golden Egg); 2004

=== With Steven Fromholz ===
- Steven Fromholz (Capitol); 1977
- Frummox II (ABC Probe);1982

=== With Bill Oliver ===
- Texas Oasis 1980 (Live Oak)
- Better Things to Do 1986 (Live Oak)
- Audubon Adventures 1987 (Live Oak)
- Have to Have a Habitat 1995 (Live Oak)
- Friend of the River 2001 (Live Oak)

=== With Butch Hancock ===
- Yella Rose (with Marce Lacouture)(Rainlight); 1985
- Own & Own (Demon); 1989
- Own the Way Over Here (Sugar Hill); 1993

=== With Terry Allen ===
- The Moral Minority (Fate); 1995

=== With Pat Green ===
- Carry On (Greenhorse); 2000
- Three Days (Universal); 2001

=== With Gary P. Nunn ===
- Under My Hat (1996)

=== Other artists ===
- Peter Caulton: Hard Road Tough Country (1998)
- Cory Morrow: Outside the Lines (2002)
- Mark David Manders: Highs and Lows (2002)
- Owen Temple: General Store (1997)
- Owen Temple: Two Thousand Miles (2007)
- Larry Joe Taylor: Heart of the Matter (2000)
- Various Artists Kerrville Folk Festival: Early Years 1972–1981
- Various Artists: Stranger Than Fiction (1999)
- Chris Wall: Cowboy Nation (1999)
- Susan Herndon "All Fall Down" (2012)
