= List of progressive country artists =

The following is a list of progressive country artists with articles on Wikipedia.

== List ==
=== A ===
- Area Code 615
- Asleep at the Wheel

=== B ===
- Bobby Bare
- Barefoot Jerry
- Jackson Browne

=== C ===
- J. J. Cale
- Johnny Cash
- Lee Clayton
- Commander Cody and His Lost Planet Airmen
- Rodney Crowell

=== D ===
- Charlie Daniels
- The Desert Rose Band

=== E ===
- Jonathan Edwards
- Joe Ely

=== F ===
- The Flying Burrito Brothers
- Dan Fogelberg
- Kinky Friedman

=== G ===
- Jimmie Dale Gilmore
- Tompall Glaser
- Greezy Wheels

=== H ===
- Tom T. Hall
- Butch Hancock
- Emmylou Harris
- John Hartford

=== J ===
- Waylon Jennings

=== K ===
- Kris Kristofferson

=== L ===
- Bob Livingston

=== M ===
- Raul Malo
- The Marshall Tucker Band
- Gary Morris
- Michael Martin Murphey

=== N ===
- Willie Nelson
- Michael Nesmith
- Mickey Newbury
- New Riders of the Purple Sage
- Nitty Gritty Dirt Band

=== P ===
- Gram Parsons
- John Prine

=== R ===
- Charlie Rich
- Linda Ronstadt

=== S ===
- Earl Scruggs
- Billy Joe Shaver
- Nick Shoulders
- Sir Douglas Quintet
- Sturgill Simpson
- Sammi Smith
- Marty Stuart

=== W ===
- Jerry Jeff Walker

== See also ==
- List of outlaw country artists
