= Viva Terlingua =

¡Viva Terlingua!

Live album by Jerry Jeff Walker
- Released: November 1973
- Recorded: August 18, 1973
- Venue: Luckenbach Dancehall, Luckenbach, Texas
- Genre: Progressive country
- Length: 43:50
- Label: MCA Nashville
- Producer: Michael Brovsky

Jerry Jeff Walker chronology
Jerry Jeff Walker (1972)	¡Viva Terlingua! (1973)	Walker's Collectibles (1974)

Professional ratings
Review scores
Source	Rating
Allmusic	4.5/5 stars

¡Viva Terlingua! is an album by country music singer-songwriter Jerry Jeff Walker and The Lost Gonzo Band. It was recorded in August 1973 at the Luckenbach Dancehall in Luckenbach, Texas, and released three months later, in November 1973, on MCA Nashville Records. The album captures Walker's strived-for "gonzo country" sound, a laid-back country base with notes of "outlaw" rock, blues, and traditional Mexican norteño and Tejano styles. The album was mostly recorded live in the dancehall without an audience over several days, but two songs were recorded live with an audience.

The Lost Gonzo Band as featured on the album included Gary P. Nunn and Kelly Dunn on keyboards (standard and electric piano and Hammond B-3 organ), Herb Steiner on pedal steel guitar, Craig Hillis on electric and acoustic guitars, Bob Livingston on bass, Michael McGeary on drums, country veteran Mickey Raphael on harmonica (credited on the album's liner notes as Mickey Raipheld), and Mary Egan on fiddle, with Joanne Vent and many others contributing backup vocals.

The album captures the band early in their life, and their simultaneously laid-back and tight style contributes heavily to the album's enduring popularity. The Lost Gonzo Band in several forms and with myriad varying members continued as Walker's backing until his death. Notable tracks on the album include a now-famous and rollicking version of Ray Wylie Hubbard's "Up Against The Wall Redneck Mother", a version which continues to receive airplay on free-form radio outlets today, both "traditional" and "progressive" stations alike. The song's ribald lyrics, uptempo rock beat and firmly country-rooted instrumentation make it a prime example of the "outlaw" phenomenon.

Other covers include a somber cut of Guy Clark's "Desperados Waiting for a Train", the Michael Martin Murphey-penned drunkard's lament "Backslider's Wine", and Gary P. Nunn's own "London Homesick Blues" (on which he sang the lead vocals), another "life of a country singer" song which endures on radio, well known for its chorus of "I wanna go home with the armadillo." It was played during the closing credits for the "Austin City Limits" TV show for years.

The remaining songs were all Walker originals, and except for "Little Bird," which appeared on Walker's debut album Mr. Bojangles, all make their recorded debut. The opener, "Gettin' By," is a semi-autobiographical reflection on Walker's haphazard recording and writing style as he describes how "I can see (then-MCA Records president) Mike Maitland pacin' the floor," but assures him, "Mike, don't you worry, something's bound to come out."

A bit of Texas tradition is captured in "Sangria Wine," a recollection of nights passed in the company of friends, Mexican food, and the titular potent potable. "Get It Out" and "Wheel", which both make their lone showings in Walker's recorded output here, are twin sides of the same coin: the first a declaration of defiant living, the second a meditation on the fragile and transitory nature of life.

The album inspired a tribute album of sorts, a nearly track-for-track remake called "Viva Terlingua! Nuevo!", recorded in the same location in January 2006. Many of the original Lost Gonzo Band members from the 1973 session appeared on the album, along with new artists who have become part of the "red dirt" or Texas Country scene like Cory Morrow, Jimmy LaFave, and The Derailers. However, Jerry Jeff Walker took legal issue with the album. After a name change to "Viva Terlingua! Compadres!" the album was released in March 2007.

== Track listing ==
All songs by Jerry Jeff Walker except as noted.

1. "Gettin' By" – 4:01
2. "Desperados Waiting for a Train" (Guy Clark) – 5:47
3. "Sangria Wine" – 4:25
4. "Little Bird" – 4:10
5. "Get It Out" – 3:37
6. "Up Against the Wall, Redneck Mother" (Live) (Ray Wylie Hubbard) – 4:32
7. "Backslider's Wine" (Michael Martin Murphey) – 3:34
8. "Wheel" – 6:00
9. "London Homesick Blues" (Live) (Gary P. Nunn) – 7:43

== Personnel ==
- Jerry Jeff Walker - acoustic guitar, vocals
- Craig Hillis - electric guitar
- Bob Livingston - bass, backing vocals
- Herb Steiner - pedal steel
- Mickey Raipheld (a.k.a. Mickey Raphael) - blues harp
- Gary P. Nunn - piano, electric piano, backing vocals, organ on "Wheel", lead vocals on "London Homesick Blues"
- Kelly Dunn - organ, electric organ on "Wheel"
- Michael McGeary - drums, percussion
- Mary Egan - violin
- Joanne Vent - backing vocals
