= Geronimo's Cadillac =

Geronimo's Cadillac may refer to:

- Geronimo's Cadillac (album), a 1972 album by Michael Martin Murphey
  - "Geronimo's Cadillac" (Michael Martin Murphey song)
- "Geronimo's Cadillac" (Modern Talking song) (1986)
