= List of outlaw country artists =

The following is a list of notable outlaw country artists.

== List ==
=== A ===
- Terry Allen
- Daniel Antopolsky

=== B ===
- Scott H. Biram
- Ed Bruce

=== C ===
- Johnny Cash
- Guy Clark
- Lee Clayton
- David Allan Coe
- Jessi Colter

=== D ===
- Jesse Dayton

=== E ===
- Steve Earle

=== F ===
- Kinky Friedman
- Blaze Foley

=== H ===
- Merle Haggard
- Emmylou Harris
- Randy Howard
- Ray Wylie Hubbard

=== J ===
- Shooter Jennings
- Waylon Jennings
- Cody Jinks
- Jamey Johnson

=== K ===
- Kris Kristofferson

=== L ===
- Nikki Lane
- Aaron Lewis

=== M ===
- C.W. McCall
- Wayne Mills
- Whitey Morgan and the 78's

=== N ===
- Willie Nelson

=== P ===
- Johnny Paycheck
- Orville Peck
- Margo Price

=== R ===
- Marty Robbins

=== S ===
- Billy Joe Shaver
- Shel Silverstein
- Sammi Smith

=== T ===
- Travis Tritt
- Tanya Tucker
- Townes Van Zandt

=== W ===
- Jerry Jeff Walker
- Wheeler Walker Jr.
- Hank Williams Jr.
- Jaime Wyatt
- Hank Williams III

== See also ==
- List of progressive country artists
