= Stars (Cher album) =

Studio album by Cher
- Released: April 1975
- Recorded: 1974–1975
- Studios: Sunset Sound (Hollywood, California)
- Genre: Pop
- Length: 39:56
- Label: Warner Bros.
- Producer: Jimmy Webb

Cher chronology
Greatest Hits (1974)	Stars (1975)	I'd Rather Believe in You (1976)

Singles from Stars
- 1. "Geronimo's Cadillac" Released: 1975

Stars is the twelfth studio album by American singer-actress Cher, released in April 1975, by Warner Bros. Records. A covers album of rock, pop and other hits, Stars was one in a string of commercial disappointments for Cher in the late 1970s. Cher's earnest delivery of ballads and uptempo numbers was overwhelmed in a market newly dominated by disco. After two more albums that sold even less well, Cher made a successful (if temporary) comeback in 1979 with the disco album Take Me Home. Stars was the first record for Warner Bros. Records and was also her very first without Sonny's influence as it followed Cher's divorce with Sonny and the dissolution of her relationship with David Geffen. Another novelty was the lack of the acute accent ( ´ ) on the e in Cher's name, which was always present on past albums.

== Background ==
In 1974, after the release of Dark Lady, Cher began recording with Phil Spector. These sessions resulted in the songs "A Woman's Story", and a cover of The Ronettes' "Baby, I Love You". However, the album was eventually shelved. These songs were released as singles but were unsuccessful, and are now considered rarities. "A Woman's Story" was eventually released in the 2024 compilation album Forever Fan. Cher then turned to Jimmy Webb to record this album.

== Release and promotion ==
Stars was released in April 1975 (Note: In the United Kingdom, the album's release date was postponed to May 9 due to the 1974 value added tax (VAT) increases that mainly affected record players, tape machines, TV sets and radios, all of which saw their tax increased from 8 to 25 per cent.), as well as its only single, "Geronimo's Cadillac". Upon its release, Stars was prompted by big promotional efforts. Warner Bros. Records created a nationwide sales and concentrated marketing campaign that, as announced by vice-president and director of marketing, Ed Rosenblatt, included specially created merchandising materials, as well as advertising support, with print, radio and television time buys. Adam Somers, director of merchandising, was in charge of servicing record stores and disc jockeys with a kit of the materials that included a black, long-sleeved shirt and t-shirt emblazoned with Cher's picture and the album title, as well as a gold satin pillowcase which bore the same logo. For record stores and other retail outlets especially, life-size die-cut cardboard standups of Cher herself, along with posters, were created to grace windows and display areas.

"KHJ (Los Angeles) (Summer Jam, 1975)"
Cher's one-hour special advertisement on KHJ (Los Angeles) (May 1975).

The radio support consisted of a double-barreled promotion led by Gary Davis, director of promotion. On May 25, a one-hour special was aired throughout several RKO radio stations, including WRKO (Boston), KFRC (San Francisco), KHJ (Los Angeles) WHBQ (Memphis) and WXLO (New York), as well as KAKC (Tulsa), WIBG (Philadelphia) and CKLW (Detroit). Meanwhile, a promotion that ran from June 2 through 15 sponsored a vintage Cadillac for each of the station's individual contests. The aforementioned Cher shirts and satin pillowcases were offered as part of the runner-up prizes. The contest was tied in with major accounts in each market.

In an additional attempt to boost sales, Cher appeared on The Carol Burnett Show and The Flip Wilson Show, performing "Love Hurts", "Just This One Time" and "Geronimo's Cadillac". The latter was also performed on Cher's own variety show on May 11, 1975.

The album has never been released on CD or iTunes. According to Billboard, Cher owned this album's master rights and Warner had no right to reissue. On July 16, 2021, Cher had the album remastered and made available for streaming in its entirety on her official YouTube channel.

== Critical reception ==
Professional ratings
Review scores
Source	Rating
AllMusic	2/5 stars

The album received mixed reviews from music critics. The Los Angeles Times said Cher's performances were uninspired, like a batting machine that always puts the ball over home plate, but never strikes anyone out. Billboard gave the album an unfavorable review and said that the album's major problems are Cher's voice that sounds "strained and/or overdone on most of the cuts" and "the mood doesn't seem to change a great deal from song to song". They elected "Stars", "Love Hurts", "These Days", and "Geronimo's Cadillac" as the album's best cuts and praised the "excellent musicianship". Janet Maslin of The Village Voice criticized the album, saying that "almost all of the songs on 'Stars' are too well-known in other versions for her to hide behind them without sounding second-hand" and that it "is in many ways more Webb's album that it is Cher's, because she rarely summons up the emotional immediacy his production means to showcase". AllMusic website retrospectively gave the album two out of five stars.

However, in a positive review, Cash Box opined that "Cher's exquisite voice is as lovely and moving as ever as she glistens on all eleven great tracks", and that the album's producer, Jimmy Webb, "assembled a fine orchestra and background vocals that greater compliment the Cher sound". The songs "Love Enough", "Mr. Soul", "Harder They Fall", and the title track, "Stars", were highlighted as the favorite cuts. On the issue date of June 7, 1975, a review on "Geronimo's Cadillac" was published, praising the single's arrangement and production, as well as Cher's performance, stating that "she delivers the lyric with style and conviction while the instrumentation is plush and moving". Phonograph Record also gave the album a positive review overall, describing it as "unrelentingly stupendous", and stating that Cher's "woeful, husky contralto and machine-gun vibrato betray never-before-dreamed-of nuances in such universally-adored folk-rock favorites as 'These Day' and 'Geronimo's Cadillac' as well as in a host of other unforgettable melodies..." On April 12, 1975, Record World included Stars in its weekly "Album Picks" list, describing it as the "best material of some of contemporary music's finest writers..." and considering "The Bigger They Come the Harder They Fall", "Love Enough", and "Mr. Soul" among the top songs. Moreover, "Geronimo's Cadillac" appeared in the "Single Picks" list on June 7, being described as "her highest octane rating in two years". Richard Seeley of the Daily Breeze praised the album as "an important link between the rock and roll subculture and the mass popular music audience", noting that Cher showed "real talent" by choosing lesser-known rock songwriters over "surefire hit makers like John [Lennon] and [Paul] McCartney".

== Commercial performance ==
Despite the promotional efforts aimed to raise the album's sales, Stars couldn't even surpass the 100 position on the charts it performed. On the Billboard 200, it peaked at number 153, while on the Cash Box Top Albums chart and Record World The Album Chart it peaked at number 151 and 167, respectively. In Australia, it peaked at number 100 on the Kent Music Report singles chart.

For its part, "Geronimo's Cadillac" only managed to enter the Record World singles chart, peaking at number 137 on July 5.

== Track listing ==
Side one
No.	Title	Writer(s)	Length
1.	"Love Enough"	Tim Moore	3:13
2.	"Bell Bottom Blues"	Eric Clapton; Bobby Whitlock	4:13
3.	"These Days"	Jackson Browne	4:15
4.	"Mr. Soul"	Neil Young	3:07
5.	"Just This One Time"	Jimmy Webb	4:53

Side two
No.	Title	Writer(s)	Length
1.	"Geronimo's Cadillac"	Michael Martin Murphey; Charles Quarta	3:03
2.	"The Bigger They Come, The Harder They Fall"	Jimmy Cliff	3:33
3.	"Love Hurts"	Boudleaux Bryant	5:05
4.	"Rock and Roll Doctor"	Lowell George; Fred Martin	3:13
5.	"Stars"	Janis Ian	5:21

== Personnel ==
- Cher – lead vocals
- Art Munson, David Bennett Cohen, Dennis Budimir, Fred Tackett, Jesse Ed Davis – guitar
- Jeff Baxter, Red Rhodes – pedal steel guitar
- Colin Cameron – bass guitar
- Jimmy Webb, Joe Sample, Larry Knechtel – keyboards
- Gary Mallaber, Hal Blaine, Harvey Mason, Jeff Porcaro, Jim Gordon, Jim Keltner – drums
- Fred Tackett, Pat Murphy – percussion
- Robert Greenidge – steel drums
- Clydie King, Edna Wright, Herb Pedersen, Sherlie Matthews, Susan Webb, Gerald Garrett – backing vocals
- Art Depew, Lew McCreary, Vincent DeRosa, William Peterson – brass
- Abe Most, Buddy Collette, Don Ashworth, John Rotella, Skip Mosher – woodwinds
- Fred Tackett – horn arrangements
- Van Dyke Parks – steel drum arrangements
- "Maestro" Sid Sharp – concertmaster
- Jimmy Webb - conductor

== Charts ==
Weekly chart performance for Stars
Chart (1975)	Peak position
Australian Albums (Kent Music Report)	100
US Billboard 200	153
US Cash Box Top Albums	151
US Record World The Album Chart	167
