= Mr. Bojangles (song) =

1968 single by Jerry Jeff Walker

Single by Jerry Jeff Walker

from the album Mr. Bojangles
- B-side: "Round and Round"
- Released: June 20, 1968
- Recorded: June 7, 1968
- Studio: Phillips Recording, Memphis, Tennessee
- Genre: Country, folk
- Length: 3:43
- Label: Atco
- Songwriter: Jerry Jeff Walker
- Producers: Tom Dowd and Dan Elliot

Jerry Jeff Walker singles chronology
"Mr. Bojangles" (1968)	"L.A. Freeway" (1972)

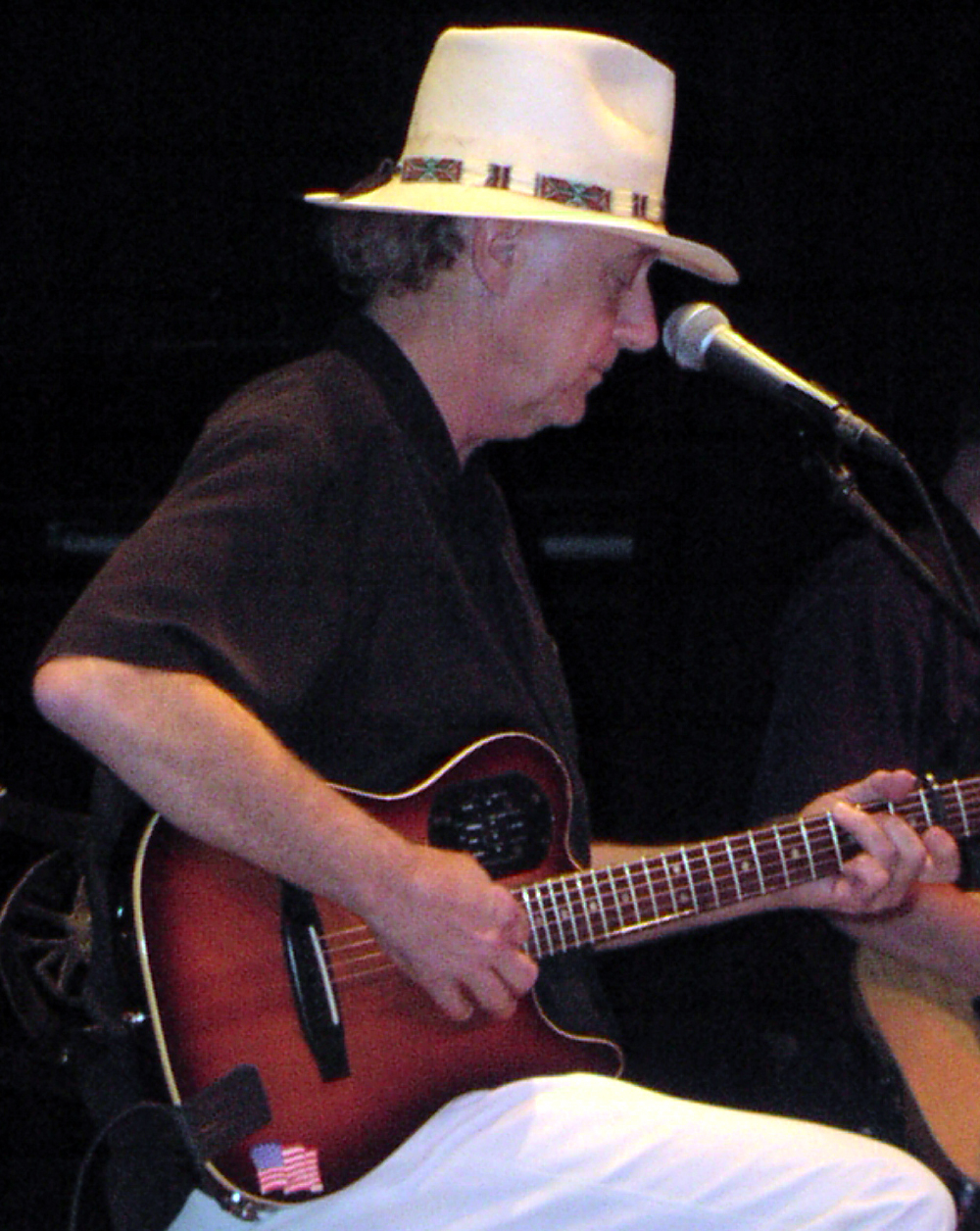
Jerry Jeff Walker, the writer of the song

"Mr. Bojangles"

Single by Nitty Gritty Dirt Band

from the album Uncle Charlie & His Dog Teddy
- B-side: "Uncle Charlie Interview #2/Spanish Fandango" (later replaced with "Mr. Bojangles" w/o prologue)
- Released: September 1970
- Recorded: 1969
- Genre: Country, folk
- Length: 5:15; 3:35 (without prologue)
- Label: Liberty
- Songwriter: Jerry Jeff Walker
- Producer: William McEuen

Nitty Gritty Dirt Band singles chronology
"Buy for Me the Rain" (1967)	"Mr. Bojangles" (1970)	"House at Pooh Corner" (1971)

"Mr. Bojangles" is a song written and originally recorded by American country music artist Jerry Jeff Walker for his 1968 album of the same title. It has since been recorded by other artists, including the Nitty Gritty Dirt Band, whose version, recorded in 1969, reached number 9 on the Hot 100 in November 1970.

== Composition ==
Walker said he was inspired to write the song after an encounter with a street performer in a New Orleans jail. While in jail for public intoxication in 1965, he met a homeless man who called himself "Mr. Bojangles" to conceal his true identity from the police. Mr. Bojangles had been arrested as part of a police sweep of indigent people that was carried out following a high-profile murder. The two men and others in the cell chatted about all manner of things, but when Mr. Bojangles told a story about his performing dog who was killed by a car, the mood in the room turned heavy. Someone else in the cell asked for something to lighten the mood, and Mr. Bojangles obliged with a tap dance. The homeless "Mr. Bojangles", who was white, had taken his pseudonym from Bill "Bojangles" Robinson (1878–1949), a black entertainer.

== Notable recordings ==
The song was first recorded by popular Austin performer Allen Wayne Damron during a live performance at the Chequered Flag folk club in Austin in 1967. Jerry Jeff Walker recorded his single version (with Bobby Woods, Charlie Freeman, Sandy Rhodes, Tommy McClure, Sammy Creason, and a string orchestra) at Phillips Recording in Memphis, Tennessee, on June 7, 1968, and it was released by Atco Records on June 20.

Other versions were also recorded, including those by Frankie Laine and Harry Belafonte. Bob Dylan recorded the song in 1970 while working on his New Morning album, but his version was not released until it was included on the album Dylan in 1973. Other artists who covered "Mr. Bojangles" include Harry Nilsson on his album Harry, and Neil Diamond on his album Touching You, Touching Me, both released in 1969. John Denver recorded the song and released it on his 1970 album Whose Garden Was This?, Nina Simone covered it on her 1971 cover album Here Comes The Sun, Robbie Williams covered it in 2001 on Swing When You're Winning, and John Holt covered it in 1973 on 1000 Volts of Holt.

=== Nitty Gritty Dirt Band ===
The US country rock band Nitty Gritty Dirt Band recorded the song in 1969 for the 1970 album Uncle Charlie & His Dog Teddy. The song was issued as a single and rose to No. 9 on the Billboard Hot 100 in November 1971.

The band's single version begins with the Uncle Charlie interview (subtitled "Prologue: Uncle Charlie and his Dog Teddy") that also precedes the song on the Uncle Charlie album. It was originally backed with another interview with Uncle Charlie, also taken from the album. When "Mr. Bojangles" started climbing the charts, the B-side was re-pressed with the same song without the interview. NGDB guitarist Jeff Hanna performed most of the lead vocals on the track, with bandmate Jimmy Ibbotson performing harmony vocals; the two switched these roles on the last verse.

=== Sammy Davis Jr. ===
The song became one of Sammy Davis Jr.'s signature performances, which he recorded for his 1972 album Portrait of Sammy Davis Jr. and sang at President Richard Nixon's invitation at a concert at the White House the following year.

=== Al Cherny ===
Canadian fiddler Al Cherney (recording as Al Cherny) reached number 45 on the Canadian RPM Top Country Singles charts in December 1972 with his recording of the song.

== Chart history ==
=== Weekly charts ===
==== Jerry Jeff Walker ====
Chart (1968)	Peak position
U.S. Billboard Hot 100	77
Canada (RPM) Top Singles	51

==== The Nitty Gritty Dirt Band ====
Chart (1970–1971)	Peak position
Australia (KMR)	15
Canada (RPM) Top Singles	2
Netherlands (Dutch Top 40)	28
New Zealand (Listener)	2
U.S. Billboard Hot 100	9
U.S. Billboard Adult Contemporary	10
U.S. Cash Box Top 100	9

Chart (1991)	Peak position
Canada Country Singles (RPM)	68

=== Year-end charts ===
Chart (1971)	Rank
Australia	94
Canada	36
US Billboard Hot 100	44
US Cash Box	45

==== Al Cherny ====
Chart (1972)	Peak position
Canada (RPM) Top Country Singles	45

==== Nina Simone ====
Chart (1988)	Peak position
UK Singles Chart (OCC)	96
