= It's About Time (Jerry Jeff Walker album) =

Final studio album by Jerry Jeff Walker

Studio album by Jerry Jeff Walker
- Released: 2018
- Studio: MoonHouse Studio
- Genre: Progressive country
- Length: 42:56
- Label: Tried & True Music
- Producer: Jerry Jeff Walker, Chris Gage

Jerry Jeff Walker chronology
Moon Child (2009)	It's About Time (2018)

Professional ratings
Review scores
Source	Rating
The Austin Chronicle	3/4 stars

It's About Time is a progressive country album by Jerry Jeff Walker. Recorded after Walker's battle with throat cancer, it is the final album released before the singer-songwriter's death in 2020. Walker released the album exclusively on his website through his independent record label, Tried & True Music.

Some material on It's About Time debuted in live performances prior to appearing on the record, including "California Song," one of many tracks that Walker wrote about his wife Susan. The Texas Historical Association's biography of Walker, written by his former bandmate Craig D. Hillis, notes the album's "highly reflective, autobiographical" nature. Like many Walker releases, however, It's About Time features both original songs and covers, including a version of "Somethin' Bout a Boat" by Jerry Jeff's son Django Walker.

== Track listing ==
All songs by Jerry Jeff Walker except as noted.

1. "That's Why I Play" - 3:53
2. "California Song" - 4:26
3. "Because of You" - 3:38
4. "My Favorite Picture of You" (Guy Clark) - 3:55
5. "Somethin' Bout a Boat" (Django Walker) - 3:41
6. "But for the Time" – 4:25
7. "Ballad of Honest Sam" (Paul Siebel) - 3:32
8. "South Coast" (Lillian Bos Ross, Richard Dehr, Sam Eskin) – 5:08
9. "Rain Song" - 4:15
10. "Old Shep" (Red Foley, Arthur Willis) - 1:58
11. "Old New Mexico" - 4:05

== Personnel ==
- Jerry Jeff Walker - acoustic guitar, vocals
- Lloyd Maines - acoustic guitar, Dobro, pedal steel guitar, ukulele
- Christine Albert - backing vocals
- Steve Samuel - drums, percussion
- Chris Gage - electric guitar, acoustic guitar, keyboards, mandolin, bass, accordion, backing vocals
