= Cosmic Cowboy Souvenir =

Studio album by Michael Martin Murphey
- Released: 1973
- Recorded: Nashville, Tennessee
- Genre: Progressive country
- Length: 40:39
- Label: A&M
- Producer: Bob Johnston

Michael Martin Murphey chronology
Geronimo's Cadillac (1972)	Cosmic Cowboy Souvenir (1973)	Michael Murphey (1974)

Professional ratings
Review scores
Source	Rating
Allmusic	3.5/5 stars

Cosmic Cowboy Souvenir is the second album by American singer-songwriter Michael Martin Murphey. According to AllMusic, this album established Murphey as a progressive country musician. Murphey's impact on the genre was as such that one of the many names for the genre, "Cosmic Cowboy music", was taken from Murphy's "Cosmic Cowboy, Pt. 1", a song that appears on this album. The album peaked at number 196 on the Billboard 200.

== Track listing ==
All tracks composed by Michael Martin Murphey

1. "Cosmic Cowboy, Pt. 1" – 3:54
2. "Alleys of Austin" – 5:05
3. "South Canadian River Song" – 7:14
4. "Blessings in Disguise" – 3:43
5. "Temperature Train" – 3:54
6. "Drunken Lady of the Morning" – 4:22
7. "Prometheus Busted" – 3:40
8. "Honolulu" – 4:22
9. "Rolling Hills" – 4:25

== Credits ==
Music

- Michael Martin Murphey – vocals, acoustic guitar, keyboards, photography, arranger
- Gary P. Nunn – synthesizer, bass, electric guitar, creative consultant, background vocals, keyboards, melodica
- Bob Livingston – bass, electric guitar, background vocals
- Craig Hillis – electric guitar
- Herb Steiner – mandolin, pedal steel guitar
- Michael McGreary – drums, rhythm
- Willis Alan Ramsey – background vocals

Production

- Bob Johnston – producer
- Larry Cansler – string arrangements
- Michael Jackson – string engineer
- Allan McDougall – editing, mastering, string engineer, special assistance
- Bob Potter – engineer, mixing
- Warren Barnett – mastering
- Glenn A. Baker – assistant, interviewer
- Kevin Mueller – release preparation
- Peter Shillito – assistant
- Eric Kronfeld – coordination
- Ryan Murphey – editing
- Bill Holloway – artwork
- Louis Cook – design, layout design
- Ian McFarlane – assistant
- Jeff Layan – coordination
- Marty Machat – coordination

== Other recordings ==
The Nitty Gritty Dirt Band recorded "Cosmic Cowboy" on their 1974 album, Stars & Stripes Forever.
