= I'd Rather Believe in You =

Studio album by Cher
- Released: September 1976
- Recorded: January–July 9, 1976
- Studios: Larrabee North (North Hollywood, California)
- Genre: Pop
- Length: 33:09
- Label: Warner Bros.
- Producers: Steve Barri; Michael Omartian

Cher chronology
Stars (1975)	I'd Rather Believe in You (1976)	Cherished (1977)

Singles from I'd Rather Believe in You
- 1. "Long Distance Love Affair" Released: 1976

I'd Rather Believe in You is the thirteenth studio album by American singer-actress Cher, released in September 1976 by Warner Bros. Records. This album was a commercial failure and failed to chart.

== Background ==
Because Stars was such an abysmal financial failure, Cher was put back with narrative pop songs on her next album. Initially, Cher discussed with Mo Ostin, president of Warner Bros. Records, the choice of producer for the album, proposing that Gregg Allman take on the role, while the executive preferred producer Steve Barri. After some resistance, the singer agreed to enter the studio with Barri but continued advocating for a collaboration with Allman. Subsequently, Allman took part in the initial sessions, entering the studio with four musicians from Macon, Georgia, where they recorded four demo singles.

Besides the songs included on the album, two other songs, "A Love Like Yours (Don't Come Knockin' Everyday)" (a duet with Harry Nilsson) and "Pirate", were also recorded. The latter, while being officially included in her subsequent album, Cherished (1977), and released as its lead single, was also included in some editions of this album. Cher recorded all the songs while she being pregnant with Elijah Blue Allman, her second child. She wrote a dedication to him on the back-sleeve of the album: And a special thanks to Elijah for waiting until the day after I finished my album. Cher.

== Release and promotion ==
The album was released in September 1976. Only one single was released, "Long Distance Love Affair" (b/w "Borrowed Time"). It was performed twice on her TV show, but charted nowhere. "I'd Rather Believe In You" was planned as the second single from the album, but it was cancelled after the first single failed. A different version of the song, in which the lyrics are directed toward God instead of a lover, was recorded by the contemporary Christian singing group The Imperials for their 1980 album Priority, which was also produced by Omartian.

The album has never been released on CD, and the only CD versions in circulation are bootlegs. According to Billboard, Cher owned this album's master rights and Warner had no right to reissue. On 30 July 2021, it was announced that a restored and remastered version of the album would be available exclusively on Cher's official YouTube channel on 6 August 2021. On September 20, 2024, the title track was released as part of Cher's eleventh greatest hits album Forever Fan.

== Critical reception ==
Professional ratings
Review scores
Source	Rating
AllMusic	2/5 stars

Record World included the album on its "Album Picks" list, highlighting Cher's "typically resonant voice" and the songs having "that immediately recognizable Cher imprint, known to record, radio and television fans". Billboard described the record as "highly entertaining and of course commercial", and added that it is "a fun, uptempo album that should please Cher's many fans even if it won't win over any non-believers".

Phonograph Record wrote that although Cher showed "good taste" in recording a new version of "It's a Crying Shame", she "isn't half the singer that Gayle McCormick was", adding that "the indistinctive production here doesn't help either".

== Commercial performance ==
I'd Rather Believe In You didn't manage to enter any chart anywhere. Producer Michael Omartian attributed this to "a lack of promotion."

== Track listing ==
Side one
No.	Title	Writer(s)	Length
1.	"Long Distance Love Affair"	Michael Price; Dan Walsh	2:45
2.	"I'd Rather Believe in You"	Michael Omartian; Stormie Omartian	3:45
3.	"I Know (You Don't Love Me)"	Barbara George	2:54
4.	"Silver Wings & Golden Rings"	Gloria Sklerov; Molly Ann Leikin	3:20
5.	"Flashback"	Artie Wayne; Alan O'Day	3:53

Side two
No.	Title	Writer(s)	Length
1.	"It's a Cryin' Shame"	Dennis Lambert; Brian Potter	2:49
2.	"Early Morning Strangers"	Barry Manilow; Hal David	3:43
3.	"Knock on Wood"	Eddie Floyd; Steve Cropper	3:30
4.	"Spring"	John Tipton	4:23
5.	"Borrowed Time"	John M. Hill; William Soden; Joe Weber; Spencer Michlin	2:57

== Personnel ==
- Cher - lead vocals
- Dean Parks, Lee Ritenour - guitar
- Jay Graydon - guitar, mandolin
- Ben Benay - guitar, harmonica
- David Hungate, Lee Sklar, Scott Edwards - bass guitar
- Michael Omartian - keyboards, backing vocals
- Jeff Porcaro - drums
- Steve Barri, Victor Feldman - percussion
- Chuck Findley, Lew McCreary, Nino Tempo, Steve Douglas, Steve Madaio - horns
- Dan Walsh, Gene Nelson, Ginger Blake, Jim Haas, Julia Tillman Waters, Kerry Chater, Maxine Tillman Waters, Michael Price, Stephanie Spring - backing vocals

Technical

- Steve Barri - record producer
- Michael Omartian - record producer
- Phil Kaye - sound engineer
- Ed Thrasher - art direction
- Norman Seeff - photography
