= Geronimo's Cadillac (Michael Martin Murphey song) =

Single by Michael Murphey

from the album Geronimo's Cadillac
- B-side: "Boy from the Country"
- Released: July 31, 1972
- Recorded: 1972
- Genre: Country folk
- Length: 3:21
- Label: A&M
- Songwriters: Charles John Quarto; Michael Martin Murphey
- Producer: Bob Johnston

Michael Murphey singles chronology
"Geronimo's Cadillac" (1972)	"Calico Silver" (1973)

"Geronimo's Cadillac" is the debut single by American country folk singer-songwriter Michael Martin Murphey, then billed as Michael Murphey. It was the title cut of his 1972 debut album which was an A&M Records release.

== Background and impact ==
Murphey was inspired to write "Geronimo's Cadillac" by a photograph showing Geronimo at the wheel of a luxury touring car with a backseat,: this photograph was reproduced as a drawing on the back album cover of Geronimo's Cadillac and also on the picture sleeve of the single. The July–August 1987 issue of American Songwriter quotes Murphey as saying: "the two images together Geronimo and a Cadillac just struck me as a song title. It was every irony I could ever think of about our culture in two words. Their attempt to make of him what we would define as a civilized person. That was the reason they put him in a Cadillac in the first place. He was actually in jail at the time." The photograph was taken at a show for the US press held June 11, 1905, at a ranch located southwest of Ponca City, Oklahoma: Geronimo, then imprisoned at Fort Sill, is actually posed in a Locomobile rather than a Cadillac.

== Chart performance ==
Released July 31, 1972, as a single which edited the track's original 4:39 length to 3:21, "Geronimo's Cadillac" reached number 37 on the Hot 100 in Billboard magazine. The track also charted in Canada with a peak of number 30 on the Top Singles chart in RPM magazine. "Geronimo's Cadillac" afforded Murphey his sole Hot 100 charting until "Wildfire" on Epic Records reached number 3 in 1975. The success of "Wildfire" caused A&M to re-issue "Geronimo's Cadillac" with a new B-side: "Blessing in Disguise" a track from Murphey's 1973 album Cosmic Cowboy Souvenir, replacing "Boy from the Country". However this re-issue of "Geronimo's Cadillac" did not chart, failing to deflect interest from Epic's follow-up single release to "Wildfire", "Carolina in the Pines", which fell just short of the top 20.

== Charts ==
Chart (1972)	Peak position
U.S. Billboard Hot 100	37
Canadian RPM Top Singles	30

== Cover versions ==
A cover version by Jeff Stevens and the Bullets peaked at number 53 on the Billboard Hot Country Singles chart in 1987. "Geronimo's Cadillac" has also been recorded by Hoyt Axton, Cher, Claire Hamill, Jacques Kloes, Lost Gonzo Band, Manfred Mann's Earth Band, Dick Gaughan, Mary McCaslin, Chris Leslie and Johnny Rivers. Native American singer Bill Miller performed "Geronimo's Cadillac" for his 1992 live album Reservation Road.
