= Long Distance Love Affair =

Single by Cher

from the album I'd Rather Believe in You
- B-side: "Borrowed Time"
- Released: 1976
- Recorded: 1976
- Studio: Larrabee North (North Hollywood, CA)
- Length: 2:43
- Label: Warner Bros.
- Songwriters: Michael Price; Dan Walsh
- Producers: Michael Omartian; Steve Barri

Cher singles chronology
"Geronimo's Cadillac" (1975)	"Long Distance Love Affair" (1976)	"Pirate" (1976)

"Long Distance Love Affair" is a song recorded by the American singer and actress Cher, released as the only single from her thirteenth album, I'd Rather Believe in You (1976).

== Critical reception ==
"Long Distance Love Affair" was praised by music critics. On September 18, Record World included the song on its "Single Picks" list, naming it "a hit" and highlighting Cher's collaboration with the "successful production duo" (Michael Omartian and Steve Barri) that "framed her vocal with a spright pop arrangement". Greg Shaw, from Phonograph Record, opined that the song was the best in years from a singer he would almost given up on. He also considered the decision of replacing Snuff Garrett with Barri and Omartian "a good move for sure".
