= H. R. Stoneback =

American academic, poet and folk singer (1941–2021)

Harry Robert Stoneback (July 14, 1941 - December 22, 2021) was an American academic, poet, and folk singer. A Hemingway, Durrell, and Faulkner scholar of international distinction, Stoneback — who, as an itinerant musician in the early 1960s, collaborated with Jerry Jeff Walker (a period immortalized in Walker's 1970 song "Stoney") and played with Bob Dylan at Gerde's Folk City shortly after Dylan's arrival in New York — is best known for illuminating the religious and folkloric undertones of Modernist and allied regional literatures in more than 100 essays. In 2002, Joe Haldeman characterized Stoneback as the "eminence grise" of Hemingway studies. He served as president of the Ernest Hemingway Society from 2014 to 2017. Beginning in the 1990s, Stoneback also played an integral role in the critical reappraisal of Richard Aldington and Elizabeth Madox Roberts, co-editing two anthologies of literary criticism about Roberts and serving as honorary director of the Elizabeth Madox Roberts Society.

A former senior Fulbright scholar at Peking University, Saint-John Perse fellow of the French-American Foundation in Aix-en-Provence and visiting professor at the University of Paris (where he concurrently served as director of the now-defunct American Center for Students and Artists), he primarily taught at the State University of New York at New Paltz from 1969 onward, retiring as distinguished teaching professor emeritus of English in 2019. Concurrently, he served as curator of the Norman Studer Archives at the college (as an affiliate of its now-defunct Carl Carmer Center for Catskill Mountain and Hudson River Studies) from 1978 to 2001. A 1965 graduate of Rutgers University–Camden, he subsequently earned an M.A. in English from the University of Hawaiʻi at Mānoa before receiving his Ph.D. in the discipline from Vanderbilt University in 1970.

Commenting on Stoneback's Hemingway's Paris: Our Paris?, Valerie Hemingway (a writer and longtime Stoneback friend who served as Ernest Hemingway's private secretary in 1959-60 prior to a 1967-89 marriage to Gloria Hemingway) wrote, "H.R. Stoneback knows his Hemingway and his Paris. I had the incomparable experience of visiting Paris twice while working for Ernest Hemingway in 1959. I viewed the city at the side of the writer while he added the finishing touches to A Moveable Feast. Professor Stoneback's evocation of Hemingway's Paris of the 1920s is as close as I have come since to reliving those Paris days in the company of Ernest Hemingway. Reading this book will be a treat for all who love Hemingway and Paris, and a pleasant surprise for all readers."

Throughout his academic and literary career, Stoneback continued to perform in a nightclub-oriented folk/country duo with his wife, Jane Arden "Sparrow" Stoneback, under the imprimatur of Stoney and Sparrow. According to a 2019 obituary, they "played all over the United States, and they have the distinction of having the first English language album to sell over 1 million copies in China." The couple "lived in Nashville during [Stoneback's] years as a [doctoral] student at Vanderbilt, and they were very active in the Nashville music scene." Stoneback "often included original song performances at the poetry readings he gave across the country."

== Recent publications ==
Hemingway's Paris: Our Paris? New Street Communications, LLC. 2010. Hurricane Hymn & Other Poems. Codhill Press, 2009.
