= The Grifter's Hymnal =

Studio album by Ray Wylie Hubbard
- Released: March 27, 2012
- Genres: Country music, swamp rock
- Length: 45:16
- Label: Bordello Records
- Producers: Ray Wylie Hubbard & George Reiff

Ray Wylie Hubbard chronology
A. Enlightenment B. Endarkenment (Hint: There is No C) (2010)	The Grifter's Hymnal (2012)

The Grifter's Hymnal is an album by Oklahoman singer-songwriter Ray Wylie Hubbard, released on March 27, 2012, on Bordello Records.

== Guest appearances ==
Ian McLagan, the keyboardist for the Faces, appears on the album's song "Hen House", and Ringo Starr appears on "Coochy Coochy", a cover of one of Starr's own songs. Hubbard's son, Lucas, plays electric guitar on three songs on The Grifter's Hymnal.

== Critical reception ==
According to Metacritic, The Grifter's Hymnal received universal acclaim from critics. Thom Jurek described it in AllMusic as "a swaggering, sexy, shake-your-ass, greasy, deep roots record" and gave it four stars out of five. Adam Vitcavage wrote in Paste that despite being in his sixties, Hubbard still displays many country attributes on the album.

Professional ratings
Aggregate scores
Source	Rating
Metacritic	(87%)
Review scores
Source	Rating
Allmusic	4/5 stars
Paste	(8.4/10)
Country Standard Time	(favorable)
Austin Chronicle	4/5 stars
American Songwriter	3.5/5 stars
Robert Christgau	(A−)

== Track listing ==
1. Coricidin Bottle
2. South of the River
3. Lazarus
4. New Year's Eve at the Gates of Hell
5. Moss and Flowers
6. Red Badge of Courage
7. Train Yard
8. Coochy Coochy (Ringo Starr cover)
9. Mother Blues
10. Henhouse
11. Count My Blessings
12. Ask God
