= Half-Breed (song) =

Single by Cher

from the album Half-Breed
- B-side: "Melody" (US, Japan); "The Long and Winding Road" (Spain)
- Released: July 23, 1973
- Recorded: 1973
- Studio: Larrabee Sound Studios (West Hollywood, CA)
- Genre: Pop
- Length: 2:46
- Label: MCA
- Songwriters: Al Capps; Mary Dean
- Producer: Snuff Garrett

Cher singles chronology
"Am I Blue?" (1973)	"Half-Breed" (1973)	"Carousel Man" (1973)

Alternative covers
- Spanish single

Alternative cover
- Japanese single

"Half-Breed" is a song written by Al Capps and Mary Dean that was recorded by Cher in 1973.

Cher's version, recorded with instrumental backing by L.A. session musicians from the Wrecking Crew, was recorded on May 21, 1973 at Larrabee Sound in Los Angeles. Lyrically, the song describes the life of a girl who faces societal rejection due to having a White father and Cherokee mother. It contains themes of racism and double standards. The song reached Number 1 on the Billboard Hot 100, becoming Cher's second solo Number 1 hit in the US. The single was certified Gold in the US in 1974 for the sales of over 1 million copies.

== Song information and story ==
The 1973 version was the first international release from Cher's album Half-Breed, recorded and intended for the American market. Written and performed by non-Natives, it is a classic "Tragic mulatto" narrative, from a non-Native perspective, of a young woman with an Armenian father and an alleged Cherokee mother. The song offers a scenario to which the singer relates that oppressive Whites call her "Indian squaw", and claims that Native Americans do not accept her as one of their own because, "The Indians said I was White by law." The lyrics are in error, as the Cherokee (like most Indigenous peoples of the Eastern Woodlands) are a matrilineal culture, meaning that a child born to a Cherokee mother is accepted as Cherokee, no matter the nationality or ethnicity of the father, and thus the parental ethnicities would have to be reversed—a White mother and native father—for such a situation to arise.

The song is written in the key of A minor, with a moderato tempo of 116 beats per minute in common time. Cher's vocals span the notes of F3-A4.

== Reception ==
In 1973, "Half-Breed" topped the United States Billboard Hot 100 for two weeks, becoming Cher's second solo and third overall Number 1 hit, and second Gold certified solo single for the sales of over 1,000,000 copies. It was a Number 1 hit in Canada and New Zealand, and a Top 10 hit in Australia and Quebec, respectively.

Peter Fawthrop wrote that this song has a jingling rhythm and that it is one of the lighter-hearted songs on the album. Rolling Stone recommended it and described Cher's vocals as frantic and the production as supremely commercial.

== Live performances ==
In 1999, after almost 25 years of not performing the song live, Cher included it in her Do You Believe? Tour. In 2002, she did the song 326 times in her Living Proof: The Farewell Tour. In 2018, she performed it during her Here We Go Again Tour. She sang it in Oceania but it was dropped after the first leg.

Cher performed the song on the following concert tours:

- Do You Believe? Tour (1999–2000)
- The Farewell Tour (2002–2005)
- Cher at the Colosseum (2008–2011)
- Dressed to Kill Tour (2014)
- Classic Cher (2017–2018)
- Here We Go Again Tour (2018)

== Music video ==
The video for "Half-Breed", a 1973 performance on The Sonny & Cher Comedy Hour, features stereotypical "Hollywood Indian" imagery. Cher appears on horseback in a Bob Mackie-designed outfit combining elements unrelated to Cherokee culture, including a Plains-style warbonnet, a halter top inspired by a hair pipe breastplate, and a glittery loincloth. The set includes Pacific Northwestern totem poles and flames, also unconnected to Cherokee traditions.

Cher has faced criticism from Native American activists for cultural appropriation, continuing to use similar costumes in performances until 2017. In a 2017 Twitter exchange, she stated she would no longer perform the song or wear the costume. Rolling Stone noted the omission of "Half-Breed" from Cher's 2024 compilation Forever, attributing it to a broader trend of artists reassessing their catalogs in light of changing cultural sensibilities.

=== Remix version ===
In 2002, a special remix medley was created by Dan-O-Rama for a video montage that was used in Cher's Living Proof: The Farewell Tour. The medley contains the videos of "All I Really Want to Do", "Gypsys, Tramps & Thieves", "Half-Breed", and "Dark Lady".

== Personnel ==
According to the AFM contract sheet, excluding Cher’s vocals, the following musicians played on the track.

- W.T. Babb - contractor
- Al Capps - session leader
- Hal Blaine
- Al Casey
- Gene Cipriano
- James Getzoff
- Thomas R. Hensley
- Donald Peake
- Emil Richards
- Samuel Boghossian
- John Durrill
- Jesse Ehrlich
- Raymond Kelley
- Lou Klass
- Jacob Krachmalnick
- William Kurasch
- Carl LaMagna
- Gayle Levant
- Leonard Malarsky
- Gordon Marron
- Gareth Nuttycombe
- Reinhold Prass Jr.
- Nathan Ross

== Charts ==
=== Weekly charts ===
1973 weekly chart performance for "Half-Breed"
Chart (1973)	Peak position
Australian Singles (Kent Music Report)	4
Canadian RPM Top Singles	1
Canadian RPM Adult Contemporary	1
German Singles Chart	29
Israel (IBA)	6
New Zealand Singles Chart	1
Norwegian Singles Chart	12
Quebec (ADISQ)	4
Spain Top 40 Radio	11
Swedish Singles Chart	6
US Billboard Hot 100	1
US Billboard Easy Listening	3
US Cash Box Top 100	1

=== Year-end charts ===
Year-end chart performance for "Half-Breed"
Chart (1973)	Rank
Australian Singles Chart	43
Canadian RPM Top Singles	13
US Billboard Hot 100	20
US Billboard Top Easy Listening Singles	23
US Cash Box Top 100	16

== Certifications and sales ==
Certifications and sales for "Half-Breed"
Region	Certification	Certified units/sales
United States (RIAA)	Gold	1,000,000^{^}
^{^} Shipments figures based on certification alone.

== Covers ==
- German singer Joy Fleming recorded a German-language version titled "Halbblut" ("Half-blood") as a single in 1973. It peaked in the West German charts at Number 38 in February 1974.
