= Dark Lady (song) =

- Single cover

Single by Cher

from the album Dark Lady
- B-side: "Two People Clinging to a Thread"; "Carousel Man" (Argentina)
- Released: December 1973
- Recorded: 1973
- Genre: Pop
- Length: 3:27
- Label: MCA
- Songwriter: Johnny Durrill
- Producer: Snuff Garrett

Cher singles chronology
"Carousel Man" (1973)	"Dark Lady" (1973)	"Train of Thought" (1974)

"Dark Lady" is a song recorded by American singer-actress Cher. Written and composed by John Robert "Johnny" Durrill and produced by Snuff Garrett, it was released in December 1973 as the lead single from her eleventh studio album, Dark Lady (1974). The song became Cher's fourth US number-one single on March 23, 1974.

== Song information and story ==
The song was written and composed by the Ventures' keyboard player Johnny Durrill. He recalled: "I spent a week in his [Snuff Garrett's] office playing him songs, one of which Cher recorded. Later, when I was on tour in Japan with the Ventures, I was writing an interesting song. I telegraphed the unfinished lyrics to Garrett. He said to 'make sure the bitch kills him.' Hence, in the song both the lover and fortune teller were killed."

The critic Peter Fawthrop, writing for AllMusic, called this song a "grimly comedic folk song."

The "Dark Lady" of the song's title is a gypsy fortune teller in New Orleans with an implied history of sleeping with clients. (The narrator of the song describes seeing scratches on the inside of the fortune teller's limousine from her previous conquests.) The narrator follows the fortune teller's limousine to her lair and pays money for her to tell her fortune. The narrator learns that her lover has been unfaithful to her with, as the (audibly uncomfortable) fortune teller says, "someone else who is very close to you." Advised to leave the fortune teller's shop, never to return, and to forget she has ever seen the fortune teller's face, the narrator returns home. She is in a state of shock, unable to sleep. But then she realizes to her horror that she can smell, in her own room, the same perfume that the fortune teller had been wearing. Alarmed, she snuck back to the fortune teller's shop with a gun, she catches her lover and the fortune teller "laughing and kissing." She shoots them both to death, presumably in a fit of rage. The song implies the narrator blacked out upon shooting. ("Next thing I knew, they were dead on the floor.") The narrator does not regret the outcome. She remarks that the "dark lady" will not be turning up cards anymore.

In 1974, "Dark Lady" topped the U.S. Billboard Hot 100 for one week, becoming Cher's third solo #1 hit. The song became a top 10 hit in Norway and a top 20 hit in the Netherlands. Like "Half-Breed," the song struggled in West Germany and the UK, though it managed to reach top 40 status in the UK.

== Music video ==
The live version, and the cartoon version.

There are two versions of the video. The first version of the video is a live performance that was aired in the third season of The Sonny & Cher Comedy Hour in 1973. In this performance Cher was dressed all in black and was wearing a black veil on her head. The second version of the video is an animated cartoon done by John David Wilson's animation studio; this second video follows the whole story of the song.

In 2002, a special remix medley was created by Dan-O-Rama for a video montage that was used in Cher's Living Proof: The Farewell Tour. The medley contains videos of "All I Really Want to Do", "Gypsies, Tramps and Thieves", "Half-Breed", and "Dark Lady". Unlike the other videos, "Dark Lady" was unique because both the live-action and the animated videos had been mixed.

== Charts ==
=== Weekly charts ===
1974 weekly chart performance for "Dark Lady"
Chart (1974)	Peak position
Australian Singles (Kent Music Report)	17
Belgian Singles Chart	22
Canadian RPM Top Singles	2
Danish Singles Chart	9
Dutch Mega Top 50 Singles Chart	15
Israel (IBA)	23
Netherlands (Dutch Top 40)	17
Netherlands (Single Top 100)	15
New Zealand Singles Chart	11
New Zealand (Listener)	12
Norwegian Singles Chart	10
Quebec (ADISQ)	4
Rhodesia (Lyons Maid)	9
South African Singles Chart	4
Swedish Singles Chart	4
Swedish Singles Chart (Tio i Topp)	1
UK Singles Chart	36
US Billboard Hot 100	1
US Adult Contemporary Chart (Billboard)	3
US Cash Box Top 100	2

=== Year-end charts ===
Year-end chart performance for "Dark Lady"
Chart (1974)	Position
Australian Singles Chart	122
Canadian RPM Top Singles	47
US Billboard Hot 100	33
US Billboard Top Easy Listening Singles	35
US Cash Box Top 100	26

== Certifications and sales ==
Certifications and sales for "Dark Lady"
Region	Certification	Certified units/sales
United States (RIAA)	Gold	1,000,000^{^}
^{^} Shipments figures based on certification alone.

== Formats and track listing ==
UK and US 7"

1. "Dark Lady" – 3:26
2. "Two People Clinging to a Thread" – 2:40

Argentina 7"

1. "Dark Lady" – 3:26
2. "Carousel Man" – 3:02

Not Released

1. "Dark Lady" (Mixmaster F Farewell Club Mix) (a.k.a. White Label Remix) – 7:25

== Credits and personnel ==
- Cher – vocals
- John "Johnny" Durrell – lyrics
- Snuff Garrett – producer
- Ronnie Aldrich
- D. Redston
- R. Williams
- Longines Symphone
- Magnetronics

== Cover versions ==
In 1974, Lea Laven recorded the Finnish rendering of "Dark Lady" entitled "Tumma nainen". "Tumma nainen" was also recorded by Ami Aspelund for her 1974 album Ami and also by Jean S. for their 2003 album Sammakkoprinssi.

In the same year, Argentinian singer Johnny Tedesco recorded a Spanish version called "Te quiero tanto (Dulce gitana)".
