= Foxy Lady (Cher album) =

Studio album by Cher
- Released: July 10, 1972
- Recorded: 1971–72
- Studio: Larrabee (West Hollywood)
- Genre: Pop; rock
- Length: 29:19
- Label: Kapp; MCA
- Producer: Snuff Garrett; Sonny Bono

Cher chronology
Superpack (1971)	Foxy Lady (1972)	Bittersweet White Light (1973)

Singles from Foxy Lady
- 1. "Living in a House Divided" Released: 1972; 2. "Don't Hide Your Love" Released: 1972

Foxy Lady is the eighth studio album by American singer-actress Cher, released on July 10, 1972 by Kapp Records. Following the commercial success of the previous album Gypsies, Tramps & Thieves, Cher again collaborated with Snuff Garrett (producer), Al Capp (arrangements) and her then-husband Sonny Bono (co-producer). Foxy Lady was the second and last record for Kapp. The album was promoted on Cher's successful The Sonny & Cher Comedy Hour show. It was well received by critics, but unlike her previous effort Gypsies, Tramps & Thieves, had only moderate chart and sales success.

== Album information ==
When it was released, Foxy Lady was on the charts with two other Cher-related albums: Cher's Gypsies, Tramps & Thieves and Sonny & Cher's comeback album All I Ever Need Is You. This period was very successful for Cher, in which she established herself as a solo recording artist and as a TV personality (The Sonny & Cher Comedy Hour). During this period Snuff Garrett helped with Cher's records.

Foxy Lady was produced mainly by Garrett; Bono was a co-producer for only three tracks: "A Song for You", a remake of Cher's 1969 Atco single "The First Time", penned by Bono, and "Don't Hide Your Love", the last single released from the album. These collaborations were so stress-filled that Garrett resigned as producer after the album was finished. Bono went on to produce Cher's next album, Bittersweet White Light (MCA), which would be a commercial flop. Garrett was then approached to return to record Half-Breed; he accepted with the condition that Bono not be involved.

The opening track of the album is "Living in a House Divided", a song about divorce, but the album as a whole wasn't able to maintain the success of Cher's other early 1970s solo records. The album contains two covers, "A Song for You" and Hoyt Axton's "Never Been to Spain"; the latter had been a top-five hit in the US for rock band Three Dog Night before "The Way of Love".

On this album, Cher again collaborated with Bob Stone, who had previously written the song "Gypsys, Tramps & Thieves". Two songs from the album were later covered by American singer Maureen McGovern for her 1973 debut album, The Morning After.

In 1976, when Cher was busy with the Cher TV show, a line of dolls was released by Mego Corporation. One outfit was dedicated to the album. The Foxy Lady outfit is in two pieces, a pink metallic with an overlaid black lace. This outfit also includes a black cape. In 1993, Foxy Lady and Cher's 1971 album Cher were reissued onto one CD called Cher/Foxy Lady, which features all tracks from both albums. The original Foxy Lady album in its entirety remains unreleased on compact disc.

== Critical reception ==
Professional ratings
Review scores
Source	Rating
AllMusic	2/5 stars

Foxy Lady has received positive reviews from music critics. Billboard described the album as a "dynamite work" with "strong production". Record World praised the album, calling it "terrific" and stating that Cher "is at her gutsy best". Cash Box wrote that Cher "has done it again", having "taken ten songs and stamped them indelibly with the imprint of her personality and style", and concluding that it is "superior listening fare".

In a retrospective review, Joe Viglione of AllMusic praised Foxy Lady as "a wonderful collection of songs", noting that Cher "puts her stamp" on the material, and adding that the album "holds up years later with more staying power than when it was first released".

== Commercial performance ==
Despite good sales of the first single, "Living in a House Divided", the album wasn't appreciated by the public, and unlike its predecessor, the record had limited success. Foxy Lady debuted on the Billboard 200 at number 120 at the end of July, and after two weeks came in at #57. The highest position reached was at #43. The album also entered the Canadian Albums Chart and debuted at number seventy-five in late August, at a time when Sonny & Cher's album All I Ever Need Is You was also on the chart, and reached its highest position (#39) in September. The album remained in the chart for fourteen weeks and exited in late November. The album may have been considered for Quadraphonic release (a first for MCA) as the track "Don't Hide your Love" was mixed in 4-channel and circulated on an internal MCA CD-4 Test Pressing LP record.

== Singles ==
"Living in a House Divided" was the first single released. It peaked in the US Billboard Hot 100 at #22 and in the Adult Contemporary chart at #2. It peaked on the Canadian singles chart at #17. Shortly after, a second single was released, "Don't Hide Your Love", which peaked at #46 on the Billboard Hot 100 chart.

== Track listing ==
Side one
No.	Title	Writer(s)	Length
1.	"Living in a House Divided"	Tom Bahler	2:57
2.	"It Might as Well Stay Monday (From Now On)"	Bodie Chandler	3:00
3.	"Song for You"	Leon Russell	3:14
4.	"Down, Down, Down"	Ester Jack	2:53
5.	"Don't Ever Try to Close a Rose"	Ginger Greco	2:45

Side two
No.	Title	Writer(s)	Length
1.	"The First Time"	Sonny Bono	3:10
2.	"Let Me Down Easy"	John Simon; Al Stillman	2:29
3.	"If I Knew Then"	Bob Stone	2:34
4.	"Don't Hide Your Love"	Neil Sedaka; Howard Greenfield	2:50
5.	"Never Been to Spain"	Hoyt Axton	3:27

== Personnel ==
- Cher - lead vocals
- Snuff Garrett - record producer
- Sonny Bono - record producer on "Song for You", "The First Time" and "Don't Hide Your Love"; photography
- Lenny Roberts - sound engineer
- Al Capps - arrangement assistance
- Gene Page - arrangement assistance
- Michel Rubini - arrangement assistance
- Virginia Clark - art director

== Charts ==
Weekly chart performance for Foxy Lady
Chart (1972)	Peak position
Canadian Top Albums (RPM)	39
US Billboard 200	43
US Cash Box Top 100 Albums	50
US Record World Top 100 LP's	40
