= Dark Lady (album) =

Studio album by Cher
- Released: May 1974
- Recorded: 1973–74
- Genres: Pop; rock
- Length: 28:59
- Label: MCA
- Producer: Snuff Garrett

Cher chronology
| Half-Breed (1973) | Dark Lady (1974) | Greatest Hits (1974) |

Singles from Dark Lady
- 1. "Dark Lady" Released: December 1973; 2. "Train of Thought" Released: May 1974; 3. "I Saw a Man and He Danced with His Wife" Released: July 1974; 4. "Rescue Me" Released: March 1975

Dark Lady is the eleventh studio album by American singer-actress Cher, released in May 1974 by MCA. Cher again collaborated with Snuff Garrett as a record producer, and with Al Capps for the arrangements. Dark Lady was the third and final studio album for MCA. It was also the last record promoted on her successful The Sonny & Cher Comedy Hour show. After its release, the album received positive reviews from critics but, unlike her previous record produced by Garrett, was only moderately successful.

== Production and composition ==
After the success of Half-Breed, Cher, for her final record under MCA, again chose Snuff Garrett to produce and Al Capps for arrangements. During that same year, she divorced her first husband Sonny Bono, dissolving the Sonny & Cher couple. This ended their professional musical ties and television show for a while. Due to the success of previous albums produced by Garrett, Dark Lady followed the same narrative ballad style. She attracted many young fans during this period of her career for her style of glamour pop, and the album shows also what Cher could do back in the mid-70s, at the height of her popularity. MCA released the album with the letter E accented in Chér on the album cover. The next studio albums released by Warner Bros completely remove the stress.

The opening track of the album is a song written by Alan O'Day "Train of Thought" that had moderate success on the pop charts. Three songs from the album were written by Johnny Durrill, and the last song "Apples Don't Fall Far From The Tree" was written by Bob Stone, who wrote her first success of the 1970s, "Gypsys, Tramps & Thieves". The album also contains two covers, The Great Gatsby theme song "What'll I Do" and the 1965 Fontella Bass hit song "Rescue Me". Cher also does a tribute to Bette Midler on the retro "Miss Subway of 1952".

In August 1993, the original album was combined with Half-Breed and issued on one CD titled Half Breed/Dark Lady, this release included all the tracks from both original albums. A CD of the original Dark Lady album in its entirety has not yet been produced.

== Singles ==
"Dark Lady", the album's first single release, reached No. 1 on the Billboard Hot 100 and No. 2 on the Canadian Singles. The song became Cher's third solo U.S. number one hit on March 23, 1974, and her last until "Believe" twenty-five years later. It also reached No. 3 on the Adult Contemporary chart. "Dark Lady" reached No. 36 in UK single charts. After "Dark Lady" the album spawned two more singles which charted on the Billboard Hot 100 chart. The second single released was "Train of Thought" which reached No. 27 on the Hot 100 chart and No. 9 in the Adult Contemporary chart. Shortly after, "I Saw a Man and He Danced with His Wife" was released. "Rescue Me" was released as the fourth single in the US in March 1975.

== Critical reception ==
Professional ratings
Review scores
| Source | Rating |
|---|---|
| AllMusic | 3/5 stars |

Cash Box noted that the album is "highlighted by the million selling title track", describing Cher as "the sultry queen of rock" and stating that "no song is too big a challenge for her", concluding, "If you like good music and singing, pick this LP up immediately". Billboard wrote that the album "could finally be the LP that will establish Cher as a major album artist", highlighting that "she has a distinctive style which immediately identifies her" and emphasizing that the set "exposes just how versatile this lady is", with "superb production" and broad appeal across audiences. Record World stated that the album "will inevitably hit a homer", and added that "Cher's vocal capabilities are superb, and this album is proof positive".

In a retrospective review, Peter Fawthrop of AllMusic compared the album with her previous one (Half-Breed), saying that is "more upbeat". He also said that "she was more wholesome and organic in the early '70s", and about the song covers that "is always fun to hear Cher's renditions of the classics".

== Commercial performance ==
Dark Lady debuted on the US Billboard 200 at No. 191 in early June 1974. The highest position it reached was No. 69. The album debuted at number ninety-eight on the Canadian Albums Chart in late June, eventually reaching its highest position at No. 33 in July.

== Track listing ==
Side one
| No. | Title | Writer(s) | Length |
|---|---|---|---|
| 1. | "Train of Thought" | Alan O'Day | 2:34 |
| 2. | "I Saw a Man and He Danced with His Wife" | John Durrill | 3:13 |
| 3. | "Make the Man Love Me" | Cynthia Weil; Barry Mann | 3:17 |
| 4. | "Just What I've Been Lookin' For" | Kenny O'Dell | 2:36 |
| 5. | "Dark Lady" | Durrill | 3:26 |

Side two
| No. | Title | Writer(s) | Length |
|---|---|---|---|
| 6. | "Miss Subway of 1952" | Mary F. Cain | 2:16 |
| 7. | "Dixie Girl" | Durrill | 3:26 |
| 8. | "Rescue Me" | Carl Smith; Raynard Miner | 2:22 |
| 9. | "What'll I Do" | Irving Berlin | 2:28 |
| 10. | "Apples Don't Fall Far from the Tree" | Bob Stone | 3:21 |

== Personnel ==
- Cher – lead vocals
- Snuff Garrett – record producer
- Lennie Roberts – sound engineer
- Al Capps – arrangement assistance
- Richard Avedon – photography
- Calvin Klein – dress

== Charts ==
Weekly chart performance for Dark Lady
| Chart (1974) | Peak position |
|---|---|
| Australian Albums (Kent Music Report) | 86 |
| Canada Top Albums/CDs (RPM) | 33 |
| US Billboard 200 | 69 |
| US Cash Box Top Pop Albums | 39 |
| US Record World Top 100 LP's | 51 |
