= I Saw a Man and He Danced with His Wife =

"I Saw a Man and He Danced With His Wife"
- Japanese release picture sleeve

Single by Cher

from the album Dark Lady
- B-side: "I Hate to Sleep Alone"
- Released: July 1974
- Recorded: 1974
- Genre: Pop
- Length: 3:20
- Label: MCA
- Songwriter: Johnny Durrill
- Producer: Snuff Garrett

Cher singles chronology
"Train of Thought" (1974)	"I Saw a Man and He Danced With His Wife" (1974)	"Rescue Me" (1974)

"I Saw a Man and He Danced With His Wife" is the third single released by American singer-actress Cher from her 11th studio album Dark Lady. It reached #42 on the Billboard Hot 100 and #3 on the Adult Contemporary chart.

== Critical reception ==
Billboard described "I Saw a Man and He Danced With His Wife" as "almost supper club type song", "much more ballad-like than recent efforts" and expressed an opinion that the song should show the good performance in the charts.

== Weekly charts ==
Chart (1974)	Peak position
Canadian Singles Chart	31
US Billboard Hot 100	42
US Easy Listening	3
US Cash Box Top 100	33
