= Train of Thought (Cher song) =

Single by Cher

from the album Dark Lady
- B-side: "Dixie Girl"
- Released: May 1974
- Recorded: 1973–1974
- Genre: Rock; blues; pop; soul
- Length: 2:33
- Label: MCA
- Songwriter: Alan O'Day
- Producer: Snuff Garrett

Cher singles chronology
"Dark Lady" (1973)	"Train of Thought" (1974)	"I Saw a Man and He Danced with His Wife" (1974)

Alternative covers
- Alternative cover

Alternative cover
- Japanese cover

"Train of Thought" is the second single released by an American singer/actress Cher from her 1974 album Dark Lady. It reached number No. 27 on the Billboard Hot 100 and No. 9 on the Adult Contemporary chart. AllMusic retrospectively described this song as "raw and fast-moving rock." In 1976, the song was covered by American singer-songwriter and musician Gene Pitney.

== Charts ==
=== Weekly charts ===
1974 weekly chart performance for "Train of Thought"
Chart (1974)	Peak position
Australian Singles (Kent Music Report)	84
Canadian Singles Chart	18
Israel (IBA)	2
Quebec (ADISQ)	15
US Billboard Hot 100	27
US Easy Listening (Billboard)	9
US Cash Box Top 100	18

=== Year-end charts ===
Year-end chart performance for "Train of Thought"
Chart (1974)	Position
Canadian RPM Top Singles	165
