= Carousel Man =

Single by Cher

from the album Half-Breed
- B-side: "When You Find Out Where You're Goin', Let Me Know"
- Released: 1973
- Recorded: 1973
- Genre: Pop
- Label: MCA
- Songwriter: Johnny Durrill
- Producer: Snuff Garrett

Cher singles chronology
"Half-Breed" (1973)	"Carousel Man" (1973)	"Dark Lady" (1973)

"Carousel Man" is a song recorded by an American singer/actress Cher, released as a promotional single from the album Half-Breed. The single was released only in the US and charted on Billboard Adult Contemporary chart at #41, as well as on the Canadian singles chart at #83.

Billboard described the song as "another perfect pop-machined single" by the winning team of Cher and Snuff Garrett. Cash Box called it "a powerful song in the great Cher tradition", noting its resemblance to "Gypsys, Tramps & Thieves" and praising its "great hook, solid instrumentation and Cher's inimitable vocal style". AllMusic retrospectively wrote: "the jingling rhythm" of the song "hit the right marks at the right time".

== Charts ==
Weekly chart performance for "Carousel Man"
Chart (1974)	Peak position
Canadian Singles Chart	83
US Billboard Adult Contemporary Chart	41
