= Living in a House Divided =

Single by Cher

from the album Foxy Lady
- B-side: "One Honest Man"
- Released: February 1972
- Studio: Larrabee Sound Studios (West Hollywood, CA)
- Genre: Pop
- Length: 2:57
- Label: Kapp
- Songwriter: Tom Bahler
- Producer: Snuff Garrett

Cher singles chronology
"The Way of Love" (1972)	"Living in a House Divided" (1972)	"Don't Hide Your Love" (1972)

Alternative cover
- Magazine advertisement for the single

"Living in a House Divided" is a song by American entertainer Cher, released as the lead single from her album Foxy Lady. The song's lyrics discuss the separation of a couple, as a rather poignant descriptor of Cher's marriage to then-husband, Sonny. Due to Cher's feelings of resentment over Sonny's control of both her life and her career, their marriage soured. They divorced two years after this song became a hit.

The record peaked at number 22 on the Billboard Hot 100 and number 2 on the Adult Contemporary chart. It reached number 21 on the Cash Box chart. "Living in a House Divided" was a Top 20 hit in Canada. The song did, however, fail to reach the success of "Gypsies, Tramps and Thieves", despite the fact that this was also the first single to be lifted from a Cher album.

"Living in a House Divided" closely parallels "I've Lost You", a Top 40 hit describing the break-up of yet another supercouple, Elvis and Priscilla Presley. The couples were contemporary, both together approximately 10 years, with Sonny and Elvis each being more than 10 years older than their wives. The songs were released less than two years apart, charted similarly, and foretold the struggles that the famous couples were facing.

An Italian version of the song, called Stare Insieme Separati is included in Primo Incontro, the debut album of the Italian singer Marisa Sacchetto.

Cash Box praised the song, calling it "one of those ballads you like the first time and love thereafter", and describing Cher as "the Queen of Pop, without a doubt", predicting the single "should soon wear a golden crown". AllMusic editor Joe Viglione noted that this song stands the test of time.

== Chart performance ==
Chart (1972)	Peak position
Australian Singles (Kent Music Report)	61
Canada RPM Top Singles	17
Canada RPM Adult Contemporary	14
Quebec (ADISQ)	42
US Billboard Hot 100	22
US Billboard Easy Listening	2
US Cash Box Top 100	21
US Record World The Singles Chart	22
