= Geronimo's Cadillac (album) =

Studio album by Michael Martin Murphey
- Released: May 25, 1972
- Recorded: Columbia Recording Studios, Nashville, Tennessee, London, England
- Genre: Country; Country rock
- Length: 44:42
- Label: A&M
- Producer: Bob Johnston

Michael Martin Murphey chronology
Geronimo's Cadillac (1972)	Cosmic Cowboy Souvenir (1973)

Singles from Geronimo's Cadillac
- 1. "Geronimo's Cadillac" Released: July 31, 1972

Geronimo's Cadillac is the debut album of American singer-songwriter Michael Martin Murphey, released on May 25, 1972, by A&M Records. Recorded at Columbia Recording Studios in Nashville and London, the album is considered one of his finest albums. The title track was Murphey's first Top 40 hit, and was also recorded by Cher and Hoyt Axton. Geronimo's Cadillac peaked at number 160 on the Billboard 200.

== Critical response ==
Professional ratings
Review scores
Source	Rating
AllMusic	5/5 stars

Geronimo's Cadillac received an editorial rating of five out of five stars on the AllMusic website. In his review, Mike DeGagne called it one of Murphey's finest albums. DeGagne concluded:

The most relevant aspect of Geronimo's Cadillac is the fact that it merges Murphey's slight left of center country sound with a little bit of gospel in a few places, giving his material greater depth and a genuine "reflective" quality that was often absent from commonplace country music. Tracks like "Backslider's Wine", "Calico Silver", and "Boy from the Country" all contain a unique musical complexion inspired by Murphey's voice and by the simplicity of the harmonica and mandolin. Later albums expose more of Murphey's penchant for being pensive and openly contemplative but, as a debut, Geronimo's Cadillac, with its three parts country to one part AM rock, is an enjoyable album as well as a worthy indication as to what kind of artist Michael Martin Murphey would soon become.

== Track listing ==
1. "Geronimo's Cadillac" (Murphey, Charles John Quarto) – 4:38
2. "Natchez Trace" (Murphey) – 4:02
3. "Calico Silver" (Murphey, Larry Cansler) – 4:08
4. "Harbor for My Soul" (Murphey, Larry Cansler) – 3:16
5. "Rainbow Man" (Murphey, Charles John Quarto) – 3:07
6. "Waking Up" (Murphey) – 3:30
7. "Crack Up in Las Cruces" (Murphey, Craig Hillis) – 4:40
8. "Boy from the Country" (Murphey, Owen Castleman) – 4:36
9. "What Am I Doin' Hangin' Around?" (Murphey) – 2:32
10. "Michael Angelo's Blues (Song for Hogman)" (Murphey) – 3:23
11. "Backslider's Wine" (Murphey) – 2:43
12. "The Light of the City" (Ray Lewis) – 4:07

== Personnel ==
Music

- Michael Martin Murphey – vocals, bottleneck guitar, acoustic guitar, harmonica, mandolin, piano, liner notes
- Bob Livingston – bass, guitar, backing vocals
- Boomer Castleman – electric guitar, technician
- Leonard Arnold – guitar, steel guitar
- Gary P. Nunn – bass, piano, backing vocals, keyboards, guitar
- Karl Himmel – drums
- Kenneth A. Buttrey – drums, percussion
- Charles John Quarto – vocals, "constant encouragement"
- Jimmy Horowitz – string arrangements

Production

- Bob Johnston – producer
- Pat Lawrence – executive producer
- Neil Wilburn – engineer
- Brendan Morris – master tape research
- Gavin Lurssen – mastering
- Bob Potter – engineer
- Thane Tierney – for Hip-O Select
- Dana Smart – reissue supervisor
- Mathieu Bitton – design
- Ron Burnham – photography
- Michele Horie – art direction, production coordination
- William Holloway – drawing
