= L.A. Freeway =

Song by Guy Clark

Single by Jerry Jeff Walker

from the album Jerry Jeff Walker
- B-side: "Charlie Dunn"
- Released: May 1973
- Genre: Pop
- Length: 3:20
- Label: MCA Records
- Songwriter: Guy Clark

Jerry Jeff Walker singles chronology
"I'm Gonna Tell On You" (1970)	"L.A. Freeway" (1973)	"Desperados Waiting for a Train" (1973)

"L.A. Freeway" is a song written by Guy Clark in 1970, a few months after he moved from California to Nashville, Tennessee. It was originally recorded by Jerry Jeff Walker for his self-titled 1973 album; his version reached #98 on Billboard's "Hot 100" in July 1973. It was later released by Clark in 1975 on his debut album Old No. 1. It has been covered by artists including Steve Earle and Yellowstone actor Ryan Bingham.
