= Don't Hide Your Love =

- Side A of the US single

Single by Cher

from the album Foxy Lady
- B-side: "The First Time"
- Released: August 1972
- Recorded: 1972
- Studio: Larrabee Sound Studios (West Hollywood, CA)
- Genre: Pop
- Length: 2:50
- Label: MCA
- Songwriters: Neil Sedaka; Howard Greenfield
- Producers: Sonny Bono, Snuff Garrett

Cher singles chronology
"Living in a House Divided" (1972)	"Don't Hide Your Love" (1972)	"Am I Blue?" (1973)

"Don't Hide Your Love" is a song released by American singer-actress Cher as the second single released from the album Foxy Lady. The song was written by Neil Sedaka and Howard Greenfield. It hit number 46 on the Billboard Hot 100, and number 19 on the Adult Contemporary chart.

== Critical reception ==
Press reviews placed greater emphasis on the song's commercial potential. Record World wrote that the return of the singer's television series should "provide added exposure" for the single. Cashbox predicted it was "certain to keep Cher's string of chart items alive and well", adding: "Watch this one climb to the top".

In a retrospective review, Joe Viglione of AllMusic wrote that the song should have been duet with the songwriter himself, because it would bring him back into the public eye (he was in the midst of reviving his career in the UK at the time and would return to American fame with "Laughter in the Rain" two years later).

== Charts ==
Chart (1972)	Peak position
Canadian Hot 100 (RPM)	44
Canada RPM Adult Contemporary	32
US Billboard Hot 100	46
US Billboard Hot Adult Contemporary Tracks	19
US Cash Box Top 100	50
US Record World The Singles Chart	45

== Other recordings ==
- Sedaka recorded "Don't Hide Your Love,"
- The song was covered by Petula Clark on her 1972 LP, Now.
