= Half-Breed (album) =

Studio album by Cher
- Released: September 1973
- Recorded: 1973
- Genre: Pop; blue-eyed soul; rock
- Length: 34:09
- Label: MCA
- Producer: Snuff Garrett

Cher chronology
Bittersweet White Light (1973)	Half-Breed (1973)	Dark Lady (1974)

Singles from Half-Breed
- 1. "Half-Breed" Released: September 1973; 2. "Carousel Man" Released: 1974

Half-Breed is the tenth studio album by American singer-actress Cher, released in September 1973 by MCA. For the production of the album Cher returned with Snuff Garrett and Al Capps. Half-Breed was her second record for MCA and was promoted on her successful The Sonny & Cher Comedy Hour television show. After its release, the album faced mixed reviews from critics, and the RIAA certified it gold on March 4, 1974. The album was her second solo album to receive a certification by RIAA.

== Production and release ==
The second album released by Cher in 1973 was Half-Breed. After the failure of the previous pop-standard style album, Bittersweet White Light, Cher permanently abandoned her husband Sonny Bono as a producer for her albums. Snuff Garrett returned to work with Cher after the success of Cher and the minor hit Foxy Lady, recording another narrative ballad album.

The opening track of the album is the cover of the hit song written by Paul and Linda McCartney, "My Love", that was released in March 1973. The album contains two other covers: the Bee-Gees' "How Can You Mend a Broken Heart", and The Beatles' "The Long and Winding Road". All the songs that Cher covered in the album were originally number-one hits by the original artists on the US "Billboard 200" in the early 1970s.

David Paich contributed on "David's Song" and for the arrangements in the album. The last song of the album, "Chastity Sun", was re-written by Cher. Originally entitled "Ruby Jean & Billy Lee", it was a song by soft rock band Seals and Crofts released in their 1973 album Diamond Girl. The re-written version by Cher was a dedication to her first child, Chaz Bono.

In August 1993, the original album was combined with Dark Lady and issued on one CD. Called Half Breed/Dark Lady, this release included all the tracks from both original albums. In contrast, several budget CDs have also been released titled Half Breed (note the lack of hyphen) by various labels. These albums use different covers, and contain only two tracks from the original album alongside selected tracks from other Cher albums, including Cher, Foxy Lady, and Dark Lady. The original Half-Breed album in its entirety remains unreleased on compact disc.

== Critical reception ==
Professional ratings
Review scores
Source	Rating
AllMusic	(not rated) link
Rolling Stone	(unfavorable) link
The Rolling Stone Album Guide	2/5 stars

Half-Breed has received mixed reviews from music critics. Rolling Stone reviewer Paul Gambaccini gave the album a negative review for the production work of Snuff Garrett, and commented that "Cher's amazingly powerful voice is not being used effectively, and it is frustrating to hear it squandered on rubbish." Peter Fawthrop of AllMusic later gave the album three-and-a-half stars and pointed out that the title track is "the only song here which would turn up on a greatest-hits collection", and that "there are plenty of other melodic, hippie-era tunes which are tailor-made for nights around the campfire." About the album style, he wrote: "Melancholy and bittersweet from start to finish, there are enough charms to keep it lighthearted". For Cash Box, Half-Breed was a "potpourri of strong new material and solid covers of top hits and a thoroughly entertaining exercise in pop performance." The songs "David's Song," "Chastity Sun," "Carousel Man," as well as the covers "Long And Winding Road" and "My Love," received particular distinction.

== Commercial performance ==
Half-Breed debuted on the Billboard 200 at number 171 in late September, eventually peaking at number 28. During 1974, sales reached 500,000 copies in North America, and it was certified gold.

The album also charted in the Canadian album chart and reached No. 21. In Europe, it charted only on the Norway album chart. Like a number of her previous albums, it did not enter the UK Albums Chart.

== Singles ==
Like her previous successful albums Gypsys, Tramps & Thieves and Foxy Lady, only two singles were released. "Half-Breed" was the first single released. It was her second song that reached number one in the Billboard Hot 100 and it peaked in the Adult Contemporary chart at No. 3. It reached number one in Canada and in New Zealand. The song was performed live in The Sonny & Cher Comedy Hour, featuring Cher dressed as an Indian. A second and final single, "Carousel Man", was released 1973. It peaked at No. 11 in the Billboard Airplay chart.

== Track listing ==
Side one
No.	Title	Writer(s)	Length
1.	"My Love"	Paul McCartney; Linda McCartney	3:31
2.	"Two People Clinging to a Thread"	Gloria Sklerov; Harry Lloyd	2:40
3.	"Half-Breed"	Mary Dean; Al Capps	2:42
4.	"The Greatest Song I Ever Heard"	Dick Holler	2:48
5.	"How Can You Mend a Broken Heart?"	Barry Gibb; Robin Gibb	3:21
6.	"Carousel Man"	Johnny Durrill	3:02

Side two
No.	Title	Writer(s)	Length
1.	"David's Song"	David Paich	3:24
2.	"Melody"	Cliff Crofford; Thomas L. Garrett	2:34
3.	"The Long and Winding Road"	John Lennon; P. McCartney	3:10
4.	"This God-Forsaken Day"	Jack Segal	2:43
5.	"Chastity Sun"	Dash Crofts; James Seals; Cher	4:14

== Personnel ==
- Cher – lead vocals
- Snuff Garrett – record producer
- Al Capps – arrangement assistance
- David Paich – arrangement assistance
- Lennie Roberts – sound engineer
- Richard Grant – album art concept
- Gene Trindl – cover photo
- J. Engstead – liner photos

== Charts ==
=== Weekly charts ===
Weekly chart performance for Half-Breed
Chart (1973–74)	Peak position
Australian Albums (Kent Music Report)	65
Canadian Albums Chart	21
Norway Album Chart	18
US Billboard 200	28
US Cash Box Top Pop Albums	21
US Record World Top 100 LP's	29

== Certifications and sales ==
Certifications for Half-Breed
Region	Certification	Certified units/sales
United States (RIAA)	Gold	500,000^{^}
^{^} Shipments figures based on certification alone.
