= Ray Wylie Hubbard =

American country musician (born 1946)

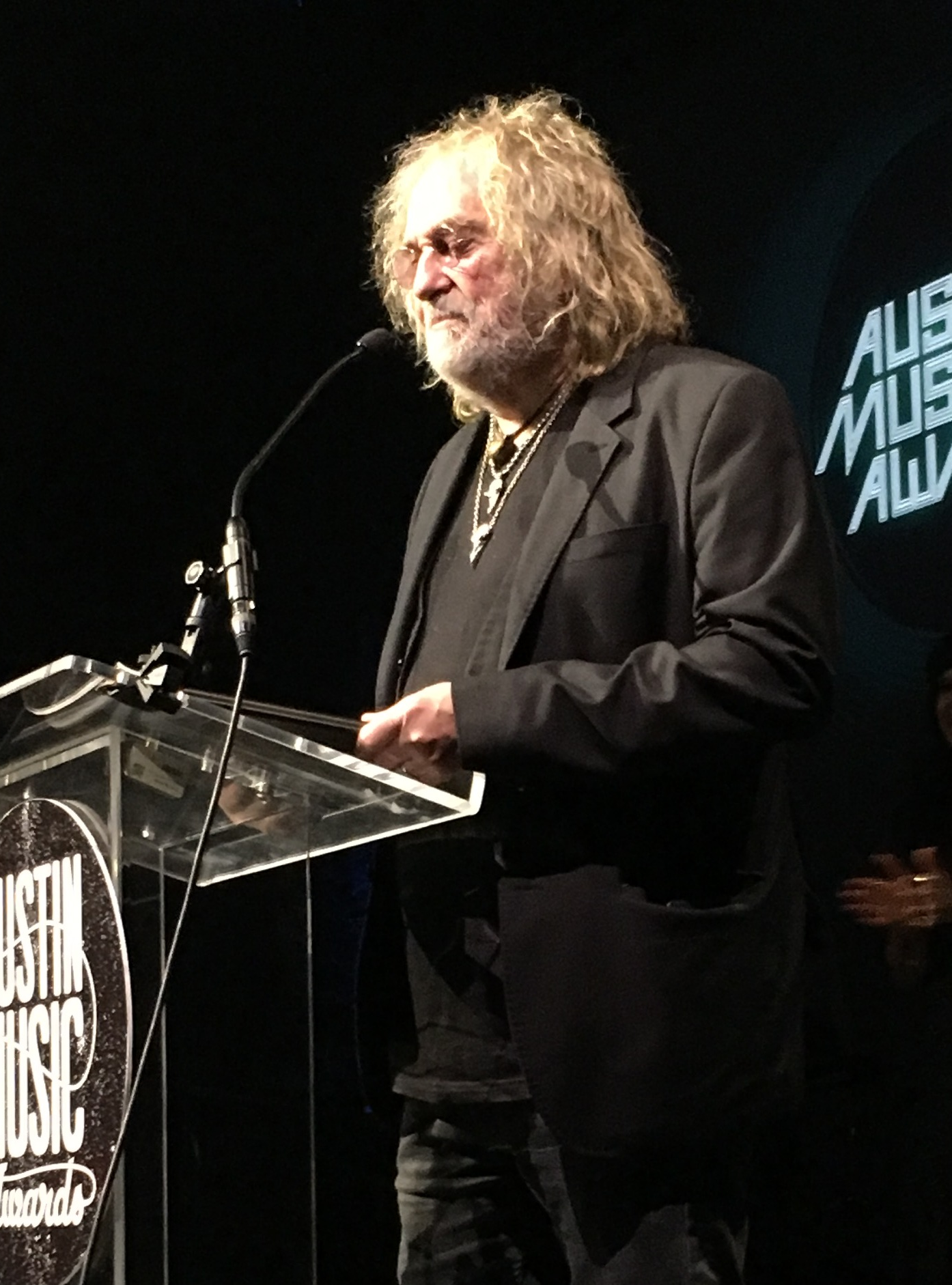
- Hubbard receiving the "Songwriter of the Year" award at the 2018 Austin Music Awards

Background information
- Born: November 13, 1946 (age 80); Soper, Oklahoma, U.S.
- Genres: Country; outlaw country; Americana
- Occupation: Singer-songwriter
- Instruments: Vocals; guitar; harmonica
- Years active: 1965–present
- Labels: Bordello (Thirty Tigers), Rounder
- Member of: Lost Gonzo Band
- Website: raywylie.com

Ray Wylie Hubbard (born November 13, 1946) is an American singer and songwriter.

== Early life ==
Hubbard was born on November 13, 1946, in Soper, Oklahoma. His family moved to Oak Cliff in southwest Dallas in 1954. He attended W. H. Adamson High School with Michael Martin Murphey, Larry Groce, B. W. Stevenson, and Owen Temple. Hubbard graduated in 1965 and enrolled in North Texas State University (now the University of North Texas) in Denton as an English major. He spent the summers in Red River, New Mexico, playing folk music in hootenannies with a trio known as Three Faces West.

== Career ==
=== 1970s ===
While he was in New Mexico, Hubbard wrote "Up Against the Wall, Redneck Mother" first made famous by Jerry Jeff Walker's 1973 recording, and covered by a wide variety of other artists since. Bolstered by the success of the song, he was signed by Warner Bros. Records. Hubbard then assembled a band of friends and locals and, in 1976, released Ray Wylie Hubbard and the Cowboy Twinkies. Unbeknownst to Hubbard, producer Michael Brovsky had decided to "Nashville-ize" the sound by adding overdub mixes and female backup singers to the recordings. The result was "a botched sound" that Hubbard disapproved of vehemently, but the album was released despite his attempts to block it.

=== 1980s ===
Hubbard then recorded albums for various other labels for the next decade, but struggled with the sales of his mix of country, folk and blues. The last album he recorded in the 1980s was Caught in the Act (1984) on his newly formed Misery Loves Company record label.

=== 1990s and beyond ===
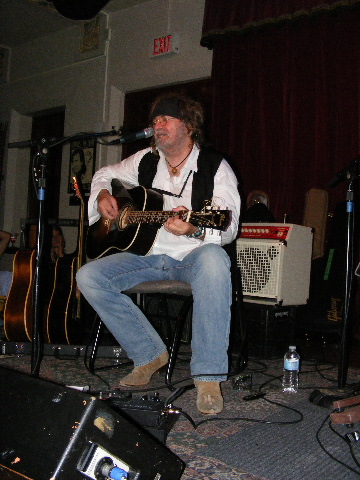
Hubbard performing at the Cactus Cafe in Austin, August 2009

He returned to recording in the early 1990s, and released his album Lost Train of Thought in 1992, followed by Loco Gringo's Lament in 1994. Eventually a steady following began to re-discover Hubbard's music and he has been recording steadily since.

He describes his 2017 album Tell the Devil I'm Getting There as Fast as I Can as rock & roll, though his style has become associated with outlaw country.

== Personal life ==
Hubbard was first married to D'Ann Griffin, with whom he had a son, Cory. Hubbard and Judy Stone married on February 18, 1989. They have a son, Lucas, who plays lead guitar in Hubbard's band. As of 2024, the couple maintains homes in Taos, New Mexico and Wimberley, Texas.

He struggled with alcoholism and cocaine addiction throughout his thirties as his first marriage collapsed and both of his parents died. Ultimately he decided on his 41st birthday (in 1987) to get sober, crediting fellow musician Stevie Ray Vaughan (who sobered up approximately a year earlier) for taking him to his first Alcoholics Anonymous meeting.

== Discography ==
- 1975 Ray Wylie Hubbard and the Cowboy Twinkies – Warner Bros. Records
- 1978 Off the Wall – Lone Star Records/Mercury/PolyGram
- 1979 Something About the Night – Renegade Records
- 1984 Caught in the Act – Misery Loves Company Records
- 1992 Lost Train of Thought – Misery Loves Company/DejaDisc Records
- 1994 Loco Gringo's Lament – Misery Loves Company/DejaDisc Records
- 1997 Dangerous Spirits – Rounder/Philo Records
- 1998 Live at Cibolo Creek – Misery Loves Company
- 1999 Crusades of the Restless Knights – Rounder/Philo Records
- 2001 Eternal and Lowdown – Rounder/Philo Records
- 2003 Growl – Rounder/Philo Records
- 2005 Delirium Tremolos – Rounder/Philo Records
- 2006 Snake Farm – Sustain Records
- 2010 A. Enlightenment B. Endarkenment (Hint: There is No C) – Bordello Records (Thirty Tigers/RED)
- 2012 The Grifter's Hymnal – Bordello Records (Thirty Tigers/RED)
- 2015 The Ruffian's Misfortune – Bordello Records (Thirty Tigers/RED)
- 2017 Tell the Devil That I'm Getting There As Fast As I Can – Bordello Records (Thirty Tigers/RED)
- 2020 Co-Starring – Big Machine Records
- 2022 Co-Starring Too – Big Machine Records, released March 18, 2022
- 2026 Reel 2 Reel 4 Real - WYLIEWORLD MUSIC, expected release May 29, 2026

== Books ==
- A Life... Well, Lived (biography and memoir published in 2015)
- The Messenger: The Songwriting Legacy of Ray Wylie Hubbard by author Brian T. Atkinson was published by Texas A&M University Press in 2019. The book includes forewords by Jerry Jeff Walker and Hayes Carll.

== See also ==
- Folk Music Club
