= Progressive country =

Music genre

- Other names: Cosmic country; Cosmic Cowboy music; gonzo country; redneck rock; twang core
- Stylistic origins: Country; Bakersfield sound; bluegrass; blues; folk; gospel; rock and roll; Southern rock
- Cultural origins: Late 1960s, United States
- Derivative forms: Outlaw country; alternative country

Other topics
- Alternative country; country folk; country rock; cowpunk; folk rock; psychedelic folk; progressive folk; progressive rock; Southern rock

Progressive country is a term used variously to describe a movement, radio format or subgenre of country music which developed in the late 1960s and early 1970s as a reaction against the slick, pop-oriented Nashville sound. Progressive country artists drew from Bakersfield and classic honky-tonk country and rock and roll, as well as folk, bluegrass, blues and Southern rock. Progressive country is sometimes conflated with outlaw country, which some country fans consider to be a harder-edged variant, and alternative country.

== Definitions and characteristics ==
Progressive country is variously considered a movement, a genre or a radio format. It developed in the late 1960s and early 1970s, as a reaction against the slick, pop-oriented Nashville sound of country music. This movement was variously marketed under the names "Cosmic Cowboy music", "twang core", "cosmic country", progressive country, "redneck rock", "gonzo country" and, most commonly, outlaw country. The phrase "Cosmic Cowboy music" was taken from a Michael Martin Murphey song. Some country fans consider outlaw country a slightly harder-edged variant of progressive country. KOKE-FM, a radio station in Austin, Texas, was a key proponent of progressive country. By the mid-1970s, progressive country artists entered the mainstream, usually in the form of cover versions by other artists, and "progressive country" had become the standard label for music that mixed country, rock, blues and gospel. In the 1980s and '90s, progressive country evolved into alternative country, and the two terms would sometimes be used interchangeably, as alternative rock clubs would begin booking country acts that were insurgent in a mainstream country scene that had embraced country pop.

Progressive country drew equally from the Bakersfield sound, classic honky-tonk country, the works of contemporary singer-songwriter Bob Dylan, and rock and roll, as well as folk, bluegrass, Southern rock and blues. Another important influence on progressive country was Roger Miller, who, in blending country with jazz, blues, and pop, "utilized unusual harmonic and rhythmic devices in his sophisticated songcraft". Tommy Caldwell of the Marshall Tucker Band suggested that progressive country combined country music structures and riffs with jazz improvisation upon which more complex structures could be built from the country music foundation. The Marshall Tucker Band's use of instruments like flutes and saxophones, as well as their fusion of rock instrumentation and country melodies, set them apart from other Southern rock bands. Marty Stuart, who stated influence from "cosmic country" on his 2023 album Altitude, defined "cosmic country" as "a state of mind. It’s a term that never got fully defined or explored or completed. My idea of cosmic country is the music that the Byrds made in an experimental fashion or the Flying Burrito Brothers." Some progressive country singers were also influenced by the progressive politics of the 1960s counterculture.

== History ==
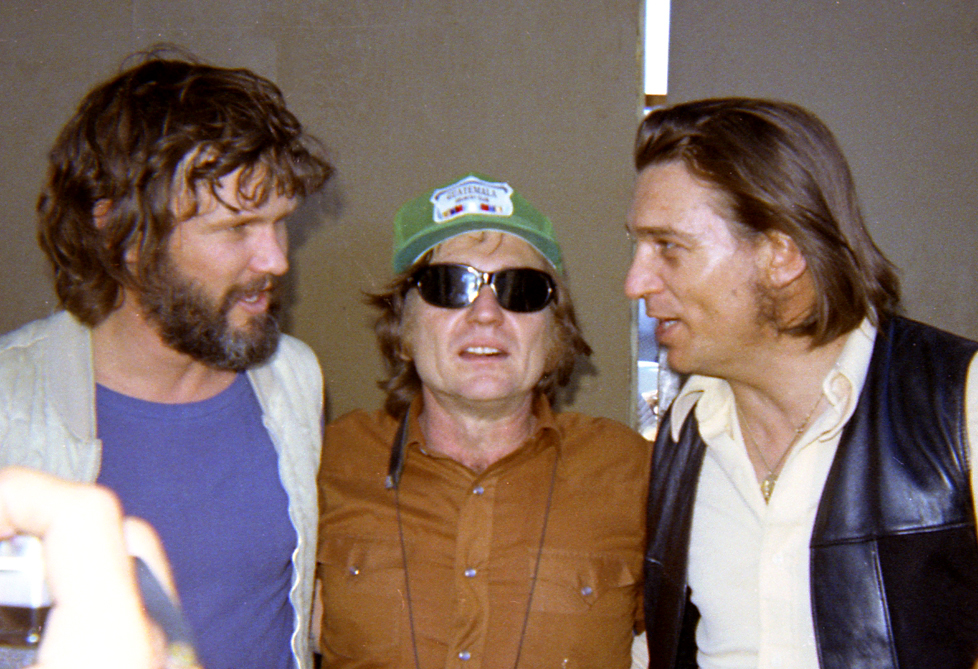
Progressive country musicians (L-R) Kris Kristofferson, Willie Nelson and Waylon Jennings at the Dripping Springs Reunion in 1972.

Gram Parsons and the original incarnation of the Flying Burrito Brothers laid the groundwork for progressive country in the late 1960s. Emmylou Harris was called "the founding mother of progressive country and Americana". The Byrds' Sweetheart of the Rodeo is considered a seminal progressive country album. Commander Cody and His Lost Planet Airmen were pioneers of the genre, as was Bob Livingston. According to AllMusic, the genre's key performers included Kris Kristofferson, Willie Nelson, Billy Joe Shaver, Townes Van Zandt, Tom T. Hall, Jimmie Dale Gilmore and Butch Hancock. Progressive country was associated with Texas county artists like Nelson, as well as Nashville pioneers like Waylon Jennings and Tompall Glaser. Joe Ely was a prominent figure in the genre's Austin, Texas scene. Jerry Jeff Walker would catalyze the movement with his 1973 album ¡Viva Terlingua! Austin's progressive country scene had a pivotal role in shaping Jimmy Buffett's musical style, as Walker introduced Buffett to both Texas Hill Country and Key West. According to NPR, Shaver and Walker, more than any other performers, "embodied the Austin, Texas-based hippie honky-tonk upheaval of the '70s". In a 1973 piece on Willie Nelson's Fourth of July Picnic, The New York Times wrote, "The term 'progressive country' can now be re‐defined as 'Willie Nelson's friends'," placing as performers of progressive country, Jennings, Charlie Rich, Kristofferson, Hall, Shaver, Sammi Smith, Greezy Wheels and John Prine. In 1977, Billboard identified the Charlie Daniels Band, the Marshall Tucker Band, Ely, Walker and Jennings as major performers of progressive country. Marty Stuart became a conduit between traditional "hillbilly" country and bluegrass and progressive country as a sideman performing with Lester Flatt and Johnny Cash, before embarking on his solo career.

== See also ==
- List of progressive country artists
