= Gary P. Nunn =

American country music singer-songwriter (born 1945)

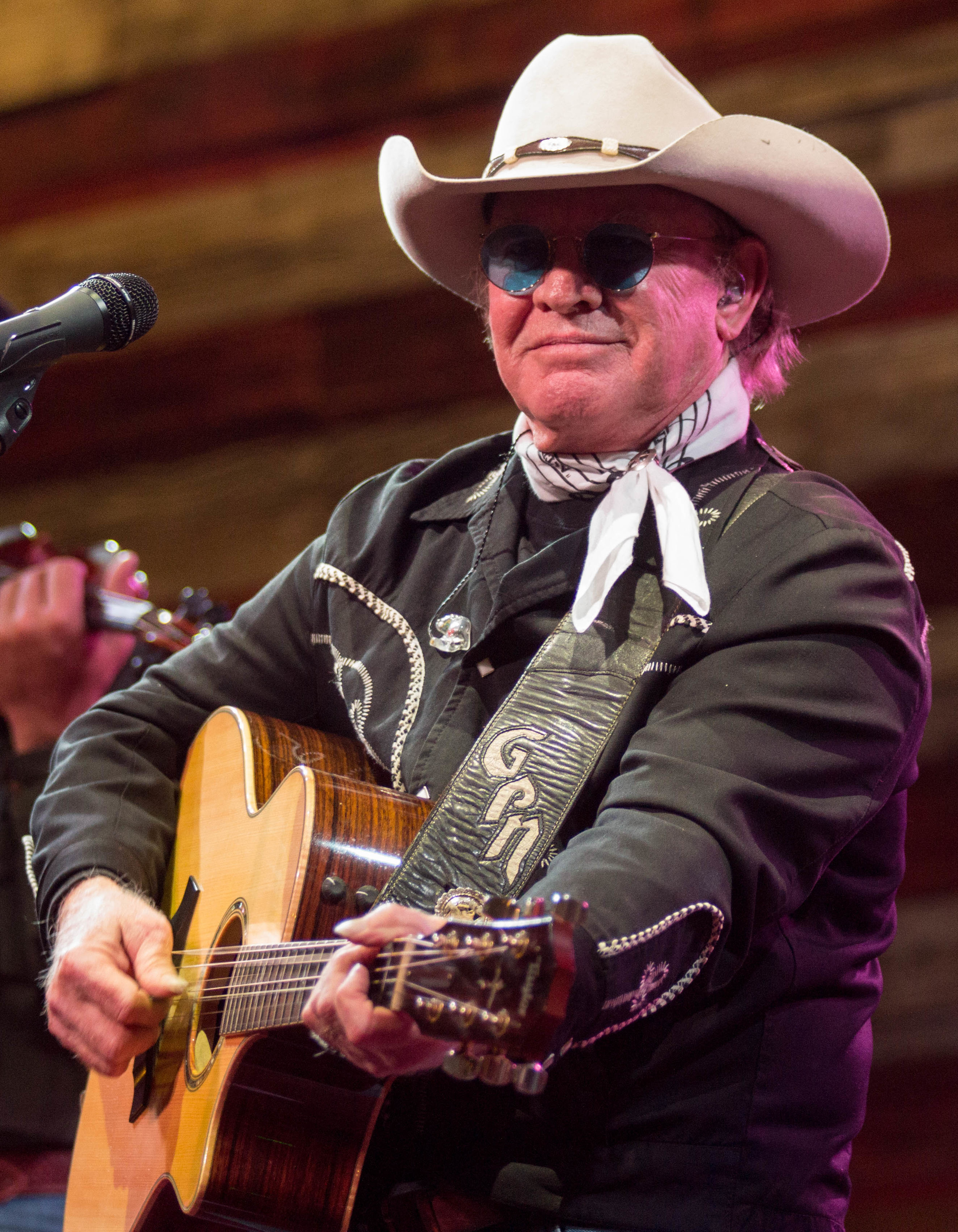
- Nunn performing in 2016

Background information
- Born: December 4, 1945 (age 80); Okmulgee, Oklahoma, U.S.
- Origin: Brownfield, Texas, U.S.
- Genres: Country, outlaw country
- Occupation: Singer-songwriter
- Instruments: Vocals, guitar, bass
- Years active: 1960s–present
- Website: garypnunn.com

Gary P. Nunn (born December 4, 1945) is an American country music singer-songwriter. He is best known for writing "London Homesick Blues", which was the theme song for Austin City Limits from 1977 to 2004 (seasons 2–29). Nunn is also considered the father of the progressive country scene that started in Austin in the early 1970s.Also writing the famous Willie Nelson song “The Last Thing I Needed First Thing This Morning.

== Biography ==
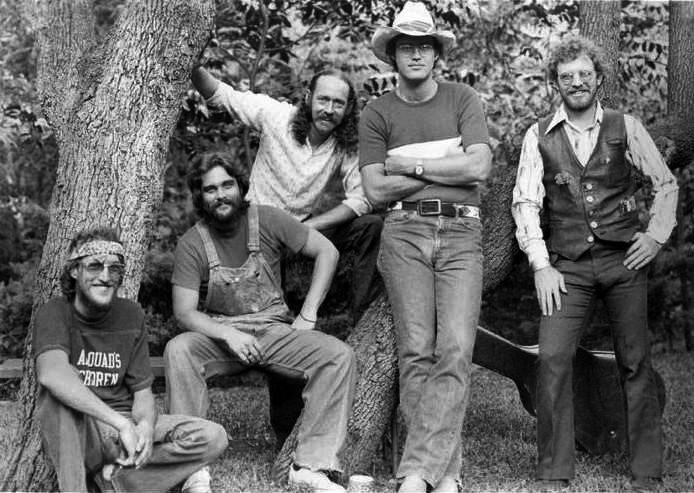
Nunn (far right) with The Lost Gonzo Band, 1977

Nunn was born in Okmulgee, Oklahoma, and moved to Brownfield, Texas, as a sixth grader. He began his musical career as a seventh grader in a garage band in Brownfield, where he was an honor student and all-around athlete. Upon graduation from high school, he attended Texas Tech University and South Plains College, while he also played with a Levelland, Texas, rock band The Sparkles during the 1960s. In addition to the Sparkles, Nunn played in such bands as the Shucks with former Cricket J.I. Allison, and the Night Spots with Don Caldwell. "I always had fun in Lubbock," said Nunn, "and I always enjoy going back there."

In 1968, he transferred to the University of Texas at Austin, where he was a pharmacy major. Nunn was there at the start of the "cosmic cowboy" movement with one of Austin's favorite bands, the Lavender Hill Express, with Rusty Wier. Nunn immersed himself further in the local music scene, playing bass for Michael Martin Murphey, Jerry Jeff Walker, and Willie Nelson. From there, he was a pianist for the Lost Gonzo Band that backed Walker and Murphey both on stage and in the studio. Jerry Jeff Walker and the Lost Gonzo Band (including Nunn) released six albums through MCA Records over the course of four years. The Lost Gonzo Band parted ways with Walker in 1977, after which they produced three albums for MCA and Capitol Records, finally disbanding in 1980. Nunn then moved on to pursue a solo career.

In 1985, Nunn moved to a family farm in Oklahoma, running an 800-acre cattle ranch at the same time as his musical career. He established the Terlingua North Chili Cook-Off and Music Festival there, where now-popular acts including Pat Green and Cross Canadian Ragweed played early in their careers. "It seems every time we had a young and upcoming band up there, it was like they hit a diving board and just sprung into the air," Nunn notes. And within today's thriving Texas and Red Dirt scene, he is a revered elder statesman to countless performers and songwriters who teethed and grew up on his music. "They’ve let me know I inspired them and showed them how it could be done." Nunn moved back to the Austin area in 2003.

Nunn's songs have been recorded by various nationally known country artists, including Jerry Jeff Walker, Michael Martin Murphey, Tracy Nelson, David Allan Coe, Rosanne Cash, and Willie Nelson, among others.

Along with being a touring performer, Nunn has appeared on programs such as Nashville Now, The Nashville Network's Texas Connection, music videos and special appearances on TNN, Austin City Limits, Texas Rangers baseball games (singing the national anthem), among other appearances.

== Awards, honors and recognition ==
- 1985: Designated Official Ambassador to the World by Texas Governor Mark White.
- 1990: Received an Award of Appreciation by the San Antonio Chapter of the Texas Music Association (along with other artists such as ZZ Top, Moe Bandy, and Tish Hinojosa).
- 1991: Given a Citation of Recognition by the Oklahoma House of Representatives for his contribution to the preservation of the unique Southwestern style of music.
- Honored by the Texas Department of Commerce and Tourism, chosen to be included in the Department's List of Lone Star Greats. This award was created to recognize individuals in the state of Texas that they deem to be leaders in the fields of art, athletics, and music.
- 1995: Added to the West Texas Walk of Fame in Lubbock, Texas; as part of the festivities, Nunn was also honored by the Lubbock Civic Center as well as the Mayor and City Council of Lubbock, the Chamber of Commerce, and others in conjunction with the opening of the Buddy Holly Museum.
- 1998: Invited to sing the National Anthem at the UT-BAYLOR game on October 24, 1998, with the University of Texas band. Nunn rode on the Budweiser Clydesdale Wagon around the track of the Darrell K. Royal Memorial Stadium.
- 2004: Inducted into the Texas Hall of Fame.
- 2007: Texas Governor Rick Perry made him a Musical Ambassador for Texas.
- Awarded several Gold and Platinum Records for writing, publishing and performing.

== Discography ==
With the Lost Gonzo Band:

- The Lost Gonzo Band (1975)
- Thrills (1976)
- Signs of Life (1977)
- Rendezvous (1992)
- Hands of Time (1995)
- Dead Armadillos (1998)

As a solo artist:

- Nobody But Me (1980)
- Pride of Texas – Live at Dingwall's, London (1983)
- Home with the Armadillo (1984)
- Border States (1987)
- For Old Times Sake (1989)
- Live from Mingus, Texas (with Larry Joe Taylor) (1990)
- Where There's a Willie, There's a Way (single, 1991)
- Totally Guacamole (1993)
- Roadtrip (1994)
- Under My Hat (1996)
- What I Like About Texas: Greatest Hits (1997)
- How 'Bout Them Cowboys (single, 1998)
- It's a Texas Thing (2000)
- Greatest Hits: Volume 2 (2001)
- Something for the Trail (2004)
- Live from the Majestic (2008)
- Taking Texas to the Country (2010)
- Christmas Time in Texas (2010)
- One Way or Another (2012)
- To Texas, With Love (2024)
