= Jerry Jeff Walker =

American country singer (1942–2020)

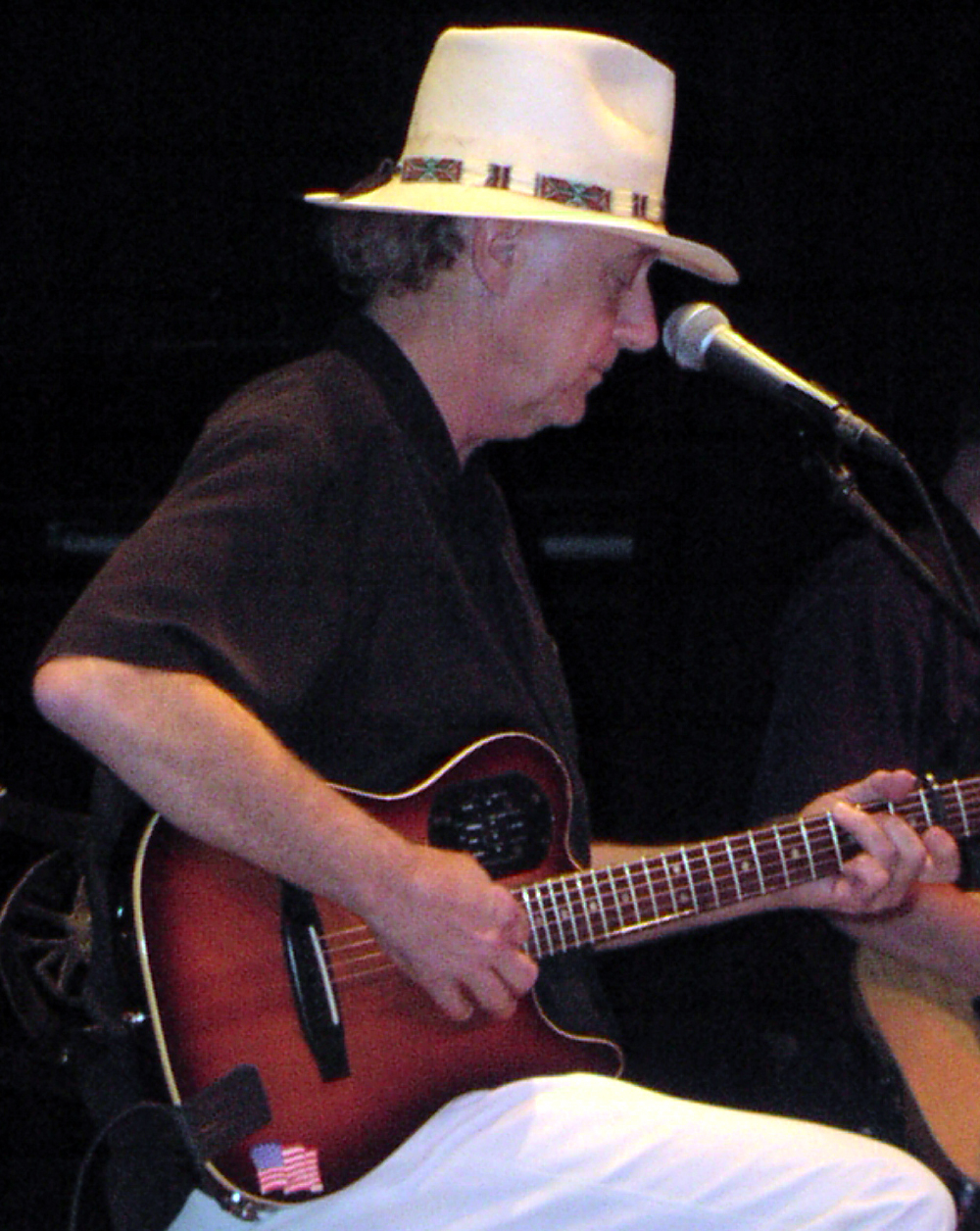
- Walker in 2002

Background information
- Also known as: Gypsy Songman
- Born: Ronald Clyde Crosby; March 16, 1942; Oneonta, New York, U.S.
- Died: October 23, 2020 (aged 78) Austin, Texas, U.S.
- Genres: Progressive country; outlaw country; folk
- Occupation: Singer-songwriter
- Instruments: Vocals, guitar, harmonica
- Years active: 1967–2020
- Labels: Vanguard, Atco, Tried & True
- Website: jerryjeff.com

Jerry Jeff Walker (born Ronald Clyde Crosby; March 16, 1942 – October 23, 2020) was an American country and folk singer-songwriter. He was an icon in the progressive country and outlaw country music movement. He is best known for writing the 1968 song "Mr. Bojangles".

== Early life ==
Walker was born Ronald Clyde Crosby in Oneonta, New York, on March 16, 1942. His father, Mel, worked as a sports referee and bartender; his mother, Alma (Conrow), was a housewife. His maternal grandparents played for square dances in the Oneonta area – his grandmother, Jessie Conrow, playing piano, while his grandfather played fiddle. During the late 1950s, Crosby was a member of a local Oneonta teen band called the Tones.

After high school, Crosby joined the National Guard, but his thirst for adventure led him to go AWOL, and he was eventually discharged. He went on to roam the country busking for a living in New Orleans and throughout Texas, Florida, and New York, often accompanied by H. R. Stoneback (a friendship referenced in 1970's Stoney). He first played under the stage name of Jerry Ferris, then Jeff Walker, before amalgamating them into Jerry Jeff Walker and legally changing his name to that in the late 1960s.

== Career ==
Walker spent his early folk music days in Greenwich Village in the mid-1960s. He co-founded a band with Bob Bruno in the late 1960s called Circus Maximus that put out two albums, one with the popular FM radio hit "Wind", but Bruno's interest in jazz apparently diverged from Walker's interest in folk music. Walker thus resumed his solo career and recorded the seminal 1968 album Mr. Bojangles with the help of David Bromberg and other influential Atlantic recording artists. He settled in Austin, Texas, in the 1970s, associating mainly with the outlaw country scene that included artists such as Michael Martin Murphey, Willie Nelson, Guy Clark, Waylon Jennings, and Townes Van Zandt. "Jerry Jeff's train songs" (such as "Desperados Waiting for a Train") were cited in the lyrics of Jennings and Nelson's 1977 hit song "Luckenbach, Texas (Back to the Basics of Love)". On September 28, 1974, Walker appeared with Doug Sahm at the Main Hall of Carnegie Hall.

A string of records for MCA and Elektra followed Walker's move to Austin, before he gave up on the mainstream music business and formed his own independent record label. Tried & True Music was founded in 1986, with his wife Susan as president and manager. Susan also founded Goodknight Music as his management company and Tried & True Artists for his bookings. A series of increasingly autobiographical records followed under the Tried & True imprint, which also sells his autobiography, Gypsy Songman. In 2004, Walker released his first DVD of songs from his past performed in an intimate setting in Austin.

Walker married Susan Streit in 1974 in Travis County, Texas. They had two children: a son, Django Walker, who is also a musician, and a daughter Jessie Jane. Walker had a retreat on Ambergris Caye in Belize, where he recorded his Cowboy Boots and Bathing Suits album in 1998. He also made a guest appearance on Ramblin' Jack Elliott's 1998 album of duets Friends of Mine, singing "He Was a Friend of Mine" and Woody Guthrie's "Hard Travelin'".

Walker recorded songs written by others such as "L.A. Freeway" (Guy Clark), "Up Against the Wall Redneck Mother" (Ray Wylie Hubbard), "(Looking for) The Heart of Saturday Night" (Tom Waits), and "London Homesick Blues" (Gary P. Nunn). He also interpreted the songs of others such as Rodney Crowell, Townes Van Zandt, Paul Siebel, Bob Dylan, Todd Snider, Dave Roberts, and even a rodeo clown named Billy Jim Baker. Walker was given the moniker of "the Jimmy Buffett of Texas". Walker was who first drove Jimmy Buffett to Key West (from Coconut Grove, Florida in a Packard). The two musicians also co-wrote the song "Railroad Lady" while riding the last run of the Panama Limited.

=== "Mr. Bojangles" ===
Walker's "Mr. Bojangles" (1968) is perhaps his best-known and most-often performed song. It is about an obscure but talented alcoholic tap-dancing drifter who Walker had met who, when arrested and jailed in New Orleans, insisted on being identified only as "Bojangles".

Notable recordings of the song include a live version by his bandmate Bromberg on his album Demon in Disguise, a single by the Nitty Gritty Dirt Band that charted at number 9 on the Billboard Hot 100 in 1971 (also released on their album Uncle Charlie & His Dog Teddy), and its inclusion in medley on the 1974 debut self-titled album by Jim Stafford.

== Later years and death ==
Walker had an annual birthday celebration in Austin at the Paramount Theatre and at Gruene Hall in Gruene, Texas. The party brought some of the biggest names in country music out for a night of picking and swapping stories.

He died from throat cancer on October 23, 2020, at a hospital in Austin, Texas, at the age of 78.

== Discography ==
=== Albums ===
Source: AllMusic

Year	Album	Chart positions				Label
Year	Album	US Country	US	AUS	CAN Country	Label
1967	Circus Maximus					Vanguard
1968	Neverland Revisited					Vanguard
1968	Mr. Bojangles					Atco
1969	Driftin' Way of Life					Vanguard
1969	Five Years Gone					Atco
1970	Bein' Free					Atco
1973	Jerry Jeff Walker		208	48		MCA
1973	Viva Terlingua		160			MCA
1974	Walker's Collectibles		141			MCA
1975	Ridin' High	14	119			MCA
1976	It's a Good Night for Singin'	18	84			MCA
1977	A Man Must Carry On	13	60			MCA
1978	Contrary to Ordinary (Note: Contrary to Ordinary also peaked at No. 99 on the RPM Top Albums chart in Canada.)	25	111		3	MCA
1978	Jerry Jeff	43	206			Elektra/Asylum
1979	Too Old to Change					Elektra/Asylum
1980	The Best of JJW	57	185		21	MCA
1981	Reunion		188			MCA
1982	Cowjazz					MCA
1987	Gypsy Songman DoLP					Sawdust Records
1987	Gypsy Songman					T&TM/Ryko
1989	Live at Gruene Hall					T&TM/Ryko
1991	Navajo Rug	59				T&TM/Ryko
1991	Great Gonzos					MCA
1992	Hill Country Rain					T&TM/Ryko
1994	Viva Luckenbach					T&TM/Ryko
1994	Christmas Gonzo Style					T&TM/Ryko
1995	Night After Night					T&TM
1996	Scamp					T&TM
1998	Cowboy Boots & Bathing Suits					T&TM
1998	Lone Wolf: Elektra Sessions					Warner Bros.
1999	Best of the Vanguard Years					Vanguard
1999	Gypsy Songman: A Life in Song					T&TM
2001	Gonzo Stew					T&TM
2001	Jerry Jeff Walker: Ultimate Collection					Hip-O Records
2003	Jerry Jeff Jazz					T&TM
2004	The One and Only					T&TM
2009	Moon Child					
2018	It's About Time					

=== Singles ===
Source: AllMusic, unless otherwise stated.

Year	Single	Chart Positions			Album
Year	Single	US Country	US	AUS	Album
1968	"Mr. Bojangles" (Note: "Mr. Bojangles" also peaked at No. 51 on the RPM Top Singles chart in Canada.)		77	22	Mr. Bojangles
1972	"L.A. Freeway"		98	98	Jerry Jeff Walker
1973	"Desperados Waiting for a Train"				Viva Terlingua
1973	"Up Against the Wall Redneck Mother"				Viva Terlingua
1975	"Jaded Lover"	54			Ridin' High
1976	"It's a Good Night for Singing"/"Dear John Letter Lounge"	88			It's a Good Night for Singing
1977	"Mr. Bojangles" (Live)	93			A Man Must Carry On
1981	"Got Lucky Last Night"	82			Reunion
1989	"I Feel Like Hank Williams Tonight"	70			Live at Gruene Hall
1989	"The Pickup Truck Song"	62			Live at Gruene Hall
1989	"Trashy Women"	63			Live at Gruene Hall
1994	"Keep Texas Beautiful"				Single only
