= Best of Soul =

Greatest hits album by BoA
- Released: February 2, 2005
- Recorded: 2001–2004
- Genre: Pop
- Length: 70:37
- Label: Avex Trax
- Producer: Max Matsuura

BoA chronology
My Name (2004)	Best of Soul (2005)	Girls on Top (2005)

Singles from Best of Soul
- 1. "Quincy / Kono Yo no Shirushi" Released: September 1, 2004; 2. "Meri Kuri" Released: December 1, 2004

Best of Soul is the second Japanese compilation album by South Korean recording artist BoA. This is her first greatest hits album to contain her Japanese songs. The album was released on February 2, 2005, under Avex Trax.

The album contains singles from her debut Japanese album, Listen to My Heart (2002) to her third album, Love & Honesty (2004). It also contains two singles that were released for the album, "Quincy / Kono Yo no Shirushi" and "Meri Kuri". The album was released in two versions; the regular stranded CD version and a "perfect" version, which was packaged with a DVD that contained a few of her music videos.

Best of Soul was commercially successful in Japan, becoming BoA's fourth album to attain the number one position. It was certified million by the Recording Industry Association of Japan (RIAJ) and became her third album to have been certified million, following Listen to My Heart (2002) and Valenti (2003). It has since sold a total of 1,100,000 copies.

== Background and release ==
Best of Soul was released nearly one year after her third studio album, Love & Honesty. In order to promote the album BoA released two singles "Quincy / Kono Yo no Shirushi" and "Meri Kuri". The former debuted at number four on the Oricon single chart while the latter debuted at number five.

== Commercial performance ==
Best of Soul ranked number one of the Oricon Albums Chart selling 489,067 copies in its first week. The album later sold 1,003,000 copies in May 2005 which made BoA the only non-Japanese Asian singer to have two albums that sold over a million copies in Japan. The first album to do so was her second studio album, Valenti which was released two years prior.

By the end of the year, Best of Soul sold a total of 1,060,039 copies in Japan according to Oricon, making it the ninth best-selling album of 2005. It remained the last album by a foreign artist to have sold over 1 million copies in Japan for 16 years until BTS, the Best in 2021, which sold over 1,120,000 copies.

== Track listing ==
Best of Soul – Standard edition
No.	Title	Recording date	Length
1.	"Listen to My Heart" (From Listen to My Heart)	October 14, 2001	3:57
2.	"ID; Peace B" (From Listen to My Heart)	May 28, 2000	3:54
3.	"Amazing Kiss" (From Listen to My Heart)	2001	4:34
4.	"Feelings Deep Inside" (From Listen to My Heart)	February 2001	4:24
5.	"Every Heart: Minna no Kimochi" (From Listen to My Heart)	2002	4:33
6.	"Valenti" (From Valenti)	July 18, 2002	4:18
7.	"Kiseki" (From Valenti)	July 30, 2002	4:20
8.	"No. 1" (From Valenti)	June 2002	3:14
9.	"Jewel Song" (From Valenti)	July 21, 2002	5:27
10.	"Shine We Are!" (From Love & Honesty)	2003	5:05
11.	"Double" (From Love & Honesty)	2003	3:28
12.	"Rock with You" (From Love & Honesty)	2003	4:15
13.	"Quincy" (From "Quincy / Kono Yo no Shirushi")	2004	3:49
14.	"Kono yo no Shirushi (The Mark of Tonight)" (From "Quincy / Kono Yo no Shirushi")	2004	3:47
15.	"Meri Kuri" (From "Meri Kuri")	November 5, 2004	5:52
16.	"La-la-la Love Song" (Cover of song by Toshinobu Kubota and Naomi Campbell)		5:40

Best of Soul – DVD
No.	Title	Length
1.	"ID; Peace B"
2.	"Amazing Kiss"
3.	"Kimochi wa tsutawaru"
4.	"Listen to My Heart"
5.	"Every Heart: Minna no Kimochi"
6.	"Valenti"
7.	"Kiseki"
8.	"Jewel Song"
9.	"Shine We Are!"
10.	"Double"
11.	"Rock with You"
12.	"Be the One"
13.	"Quincy"
14.	"Meri Kuri"
15.	"The Love Bug"
16.	"Making of Quincy"
17.	"Making of Meri Kuri"

== Charts ==
=== Weekly charts ===
Chart (2005)	Peak position
Japanese Albums (Oricon)	1
Singaporean Albums (RIAS)	1

=== Monthly charts ===
Chart (2005)	Peak position
South Korean Int'l Albums (MIAK)	1

=== Year-end charts ===
Chart (2005)	Position
Japanese Albums (Oricon)	9

== Sales and certifications ==
Region	Certification	Certified units/sales
Japan (RIAJ)	Million	1,100,000
South Korea (RIAK)	—	38,000

== Release history ==
Region	Date	Edition	Format(s)	Label
Japan	February 2, 2005	Standard edition	CD; digital download	Avex Trax
Japan	February 2, 2005	Perfect edition	CD + DVD	Avex Trax
South Korea	February 22, 2005	Standard edition	CD; digital download	SM Entertainment; Avex
