= Next World =

Remix album by BoA
- Released: August 27, 2003
- Recorded: 2002–2003
- Genre: Pop
- Label: Avex Trax
- Producer: Lee Soo Man

BoA chronology
| Atlantis Princess (2003) | Next World (2003) | Shine We Are! (2003) |

Professional ratings
Review scores
| Source | Rating |
|---|---|
| J-fan.com | 3.5/5 stars |

Next World is the second remix album by BoA after her Peace B. Remixes album in 2002. It featured many remixes of her hit songs, and collection of several English version of her songs from previous singles.

== Track listing ==
1. "Holiday" (Palmdrive featuring BoA & Firstklas)
2. "Kiseki / 奇蹟" (Soul'd Out Remix)
3. "Flying Without Wings" (Westlife featuring BoA)
4. "Show Me What You Got" (Bratz featuring BoA & Howie D.) (DJ Watarai Remix)
5. "Jewel Song" (Akira's Canto Diamante Version)
6. "Shine We Are!" (Remixed by G.T.S) (Groove That Soul Remix)
7. "Flower" (Remixed by Daisuke Imai featuring Lisa) (D.I's "Luv Hurts" Remix)
8. "Winding Road" (featuring Dabo)
9. "Everything Needs Love" (Mondo Grosso featuring BoA) (Piano-pella)
10. "Valenti" (English version)
11. "Every Heart: Minna no Kimochi" (English version)
12. "Listen To My Heart" (English version)
13. "Amazing Kiss" (English version)
