= Atlantis Princess =

Studio album by BoA
- Released: May 30, 2003
- Recorded: 2003
- Studio: SM Studios (Seoul)
- Genre: Dance-pop
- Length: 50:32
- Language: Korean
- Label: SM

BoA chronology
| Valenti (2003) | Atlantis Princess (2003) | Next World (2003) |

Singles from Atlantis Princess
- 1. "The Lights of Seoul" Released: May 25, 2003; 2. "Atlantis Princess" Released: May 30, 2003; 3. "Milky Way" Released: May 30, 2003

Atlantis Princess is the third Korean studio album (fifth overall) by South Korean recording artist BoA, released through SM Entertainment on May 30, 2003. The record spawned three singles, including the Seoul Metropolitan Government promotional single "Lights of Seoul", the title track "Atlantis Princess", and "Milky Way", with accompanying music videos produced for the latter two songs. An overseas version of the album, containing a bonus video CD, was released in several territories in Asia such as the Philippines, Hong Kong and Taiwan.

Atlantis Princess is primarily a pop record with lyrics touching on themes of pursuing dreams and aspirations. It was met with generally favorable reviews from music critics, with IZM complimenting BoA's performance and the album's production. The single "Atlantis Princess" ranked number one on the music programs Inkigayo and Music Camp for multiple weeks, and won Best Dance Performance at the 2003 Mnet Music Video Festival.

The album was commercially successful in South Korea, debuting at number one on the Recording Industry Association of Korea (RIAK) album chart in May 2003, with monthly sales of 128,000 copies from two days alone. It remained at number one the following month and sold over 345,000 copies in 2003, ranking as the fifth best-selling album of the year in South Korea and the second best-selling album by a female artist.

== Background and release ==
The album's title track, "Atlantis Princess", was composed by Hwang Sung-jae and is a fast-tempo dance song that expresses a bright and hopeful message. The music video for the single was filmed in Australia in mid-May 2003. BoA performed the song on live television for the first time on Inkigayo on June 1.

The follow-up single "Milky Way" was written and produced by Kenzie. The Japanese version of the track was included as a B-side for her single "Double" and was added as a bonus track to her third Japanese album Love & Honesty (2004). "The Lights of Seoul" is a promo CD single which was a special release given to people who attended Hi Seoul Festival in May 2003, and was introduced on the website of the Seoul Metropolitan Government as a promotional track for the organization.

== Reception ==
Lee Min-hee of IZM gave Atlantis Princess a positive review, complimenting BoA's performance and the album's production. However, a reviewer from the Daily Vault was not as impressed, feeling that there were a number of "unmemorable filler songs". Retrospectively, "Atlantis Princess" appeared at number 93 on Melon and Seoul Shinmun's list of Top 100 K-pop Songs of All Time and number 1 on The Forty-Five's list of the 45 best K-pop songs of all time.

Professional ratings
Review scores
| Source | Rating |
|---|---|
| Daily Vault | 3.5/5 stars |
| IZM | (positive) |

Although Atlantis Princess was released at the end of May, it was the best-selling album of the month and debuted at number-one on the Recording Industry Association of Korea (RIAK) album chart issue for May 2003, selling 127,887 copies. It retained its number-one position the following month and sold an additional 124,747 copies. Atlantis Princess ended at number five in the year-end ranking of the best-selling albums in South Korea for 2003, selling a total of 345,313 copies throughout the year. It was the second best-selling album by a female artist in 2003 after Lee Soo-young's This Time, which sold 435,904 copies.

== Covers ==
"Atlantis Princess" has been covered by various K-pop artists since its release, including Taeyeon, Golden Child, DKB, Iz*One, (G)I-dle's Miyeon and Woodz, Mamamoo, and Nmixx. In August 2020, Bolbbalgan4 released a cover version of the song as part of SM Station's tribute project for BoA's 20th anniversary, which peaked at number 36 on the Gaon Digital Chart and number 26 on the K-pop Hot 100. Red Velvet released a jazz remake of "Milky Way" for the same project, which peaked at number 64 on the K-pop Hot 100.

== Track listing ==
Atlantis Princess – Standard edition
| No. | Title | Lyrics | Music | Arrangement | Length |
|---|---|---|---|---|---|
| 1. | "Time to Begin" | Kenzie | Kenzie | Kenzie | 3:36 |
| 2. | "Atlantis Princess" (아틀란티스 소녀) | Tae-hoon | Hwang Sung-jae | Hwang Sung-jae | 3:44 |
| 3. | "Tree" (나무) | Ahn Ik-soo | Kwon Ki-myung | Ahn Ik-soo | 4:28 |
| 4. | "Milky Way" | Kenzie | Kenzie | Kenzie | 3:20 |
| 5. | "Beat of Angel" (천사의 숨결) | Hong Ji-yu | Ahn Ik-soo | Ahn Ik-soo | 3:40 |
| 6. | "Gift" (선물) | Park Chang-hyun | Park Chang-hyun | Park Chang-hyun | 3:44 |
| 7. | "Where Are You" (이런 내게) | Bae Hwa-young | Ko Young-jo | Ko Young-jo | 3:48 |
| 8. | "Make a Move" (단념) | Park Ki-hyun | Oh Seung-eun | Oh Seung-eun | 3:03 |
| 9. | "So Much in Love" (사랑해요) | Park Chae-won | Ha Jung-ho | Go Nam-soo | 3:55 |
| 10. | "Endless Sorrow" (남겨진 슬픔) | Kim Ju-hyung | Choi Seung-min | Choi Seung-min | 4:09 |
| 11. | "The Show Must Go On" | Park Chang-hak | Yoon-sang | Fractal | 4:05 |
| 12. | "The Lights of Seoul" (서울의 빛) | Jo Yoon-kyung | Hong-seok; Hwang Sung-jae | Hwang Sung-jae | 4:25 |
| 13. | "The Lights of Seoul" (English version) | Oh Sung-sin | Hong-seok; Hwang Sung-jae | Hwang Sung-jae | 4:25 |
| Total length: | | | | | 50:22 |

Atlantis Princess – Overseas edition bonus VCD
| No. | Title | Length |
|---|---|---|
| 1. | "Atlantis Princess MV" (with Chinese subtitles) |

== Charts ==
=== Weekly charts ===
| Chart (2003) | Peak position |
|---|---|
| Singaporean Albums (RIAS) | 4 |

=== Monthly charts ===
| Chart (2003) | Peak position |
|---|---|
| South Korean Albums (RIAK) | 1 |

=== Year-end charts ===
| Chart (2003) | Position |
|---|---|
| South Korean Albums (RIAK) | 5 |

== Sales ==
Sales for Atlantis Princess
| Region | Sales amount |
|---|---|
| South Korea | 345,313 |
