= Meri Kuri =

Single by BoA

from the album Best of Soul
- Language: Japanese; Korean
- B-side: "Mega Step"; "The Christmas Song"
- Released: December 1, 2004
- Recorded: 2004
- Genre: J-pop; K-pop
- Length: 5:32
- Label: Avex Trax; SM
- Songwriters: Chinfa Kan; BoA
- Producer: Kazuhiro Hara

BoA singles chronology
"Quincy / Kono Yo no Shirushi" (2004)	"Meri Kuri" (2004)	"Do the Motion" (2005)

Music video
- "Meri Kuri" on YouTube

"Meri Kuri" (Japanese: メリクリ), known in South Korea as "Merry-Chri" (Korean: 메리크리 Meri Keuri), is a song recorded in two languages by South Korean singer BoA. A holiday-themed ballad, its lyrics were written by Chinfa Kan and BoA; production was handled by Kazuhiro Hara. It was released on December 1, 2004, as her 14th Japanese single, via Avex Trax; and her 3rd physical Korean single, by SM Entertainment. Both versions are supported with the B-side tracks "Mega Step" and "The Christmas Song". Its music video premiered on her 18th birthday and was shot at the Chapel on the Water and Ochiai Station in Hokkaidō.

The single peaked at number five on the Japan weekly singles chart and number ten on the South Korean monthly album chart. It was certified by the Recording Industry Association of Japan (RIAJ) in four categories, including two times in double platinum for digital and ringtone sales. "Meri Kuri" has become a Christmas favorite in Japan and has consistently re-appeared on the charts around Christmas time. BoA has performed "Meri Kuri" on numerous concert tours, including her five Christmas concert tours.

== Background and release ==
"Meri Kuri", marketed in South Korea as "Merry-Chri", was released as two singles in Japan and South Korea simultaneously on December 1, 2004. The holiday-themed single contains three tracks that revolve around the theme of a winter atmosphere; the track "Mega Step" conveys imagery of footprints in the snow while the track "The Christmas Song", a cover of Nat King Cole, is a carol that uses jazz. The B-side tracks were used as background tracks in advertisement campaigns for Skechers and Toshiba in Japan, respectively.

The title track was composed by Kazuhiro Hara, who had previously composed the single "Valenti" (2002). Its Japanese lyrics were written by Chinfa Kan while the Korean version lyrics were written by BoA herself. The song tells lovers promising to stay together forever on a snowy winter day. She re-recorded the song with new instrumentation to mark 15 years as a pro singer; it was released as a b-side of her December 2015 single "Lookbook". The song was covered by American rock band Weezer on the Japanese version of the Deluxe Edition of their 2008 self-titled album. On July 20, 2018, several members of the reality competition show Produce 48 performed the Japanese version of the song live on Mnet.

== Reception ==
The song has received positive reviews from music journalists. Character Media's Amanda Walujono praised its production and was especially favorable towards its "sweet, but slightly melancholic verses to the gradual buildup of the soaring chorus". The Korea JoongAng Daily wrote it is often dubbed Japan's "All I Want for Christmas is You" by Mariah Carey due to its immense popularity in Japan. It has also been compared to the song "Cherry Blossom Ending" by Busker Busker, which is known to re-enter the charts every year in South Korea during the springtime. The Korea Herald included the song in their list of 15 best K-pop Christmas Songs, where they complimented its timelessness and wrote that it has experienced long-term success, particularly in Japan, becoming one of the country's Christmas favorites.

Commercially, the single performed modestly on the charts in both countries. In South Korea, the physical single peaked at number ten on the monthly MIAK album chart for December 2004, selling 20,000 copies. On the Oricon Singles Chart in Japan, "Meri Kuri" peaked at number five and charted for eleven weeks. Despite charting comparatively low as compared to her previous releases, it sold 136,725 during its charting time and was ranked the 74th best-selling single in the country in 2005. It was certified double platinum by the Recording Industry Association of Japan (RIAJ) in the chaku-uta category in August 2006, and was certified gold for physical shipments of over 100,000 units in January 2013. It was further certified double platinum for surpassing 500,000 units in digital sales in January 2018 and gold for streaming in August 2021. In January 2018, the song attained a new peak of number 23 on the Billboard Japan Hot 100 after more than a decade after its release.

== Live performances ==
BoA performed "Meri Kuri" live for the first time for Fuji TV's FNS Music Festival on December 1, 2004; she recorded a special stage on a rooftop of a building for the event in Dongdaemun, where it was broadcast on television throughout Japan. She again performed the song at the Anugerah Musik Indonesia Awards in Jakarta on December 16 and on Mnet's Christmas special broadcast the following day. The song has been included on the set lists for several of her concert tours throughout her career, including her five Christmas concept tours.

== Track listing ==
Japanese version

1. "Meri Kuri" (メリクリ) – 5:32
2. "Mega Step" – 4:31
3. "The Christmas Song" – 5:10
4. "Meri Kuri" (メリクリ) (Instrumental) – 5:32
5. "Mega Step" (Instrumental) – 4:31

Korean version

1. "Merry-Chri" (메리-크리) – 5:32
2. "Mega Step" – 4:31
3. "The Christmas Song" – 5:10
4. "Merry-Chri" (메리-크리) (Instrumental) – 5:32
5. "Mega Step" (Instrumental) – 4:31

== Charts ==
=== Weekly charts ===
Chart (2004)	Peak position
Japan Singles (Oricon)	5

Chart (2018)	Peak position
Japan (Japan Hot 100)	23

=== Monthly charts ===
Chart (2004)	Peak position
South Korean Albums (MIAK)	10

== Sales and certifications ==
Region	Certification	Certified units/sales
Japan (RIAJ) Digital single	2× Platinum	500,000^{*}
Japan (RIAJ) Physical single	Gold	137,000
Japan (RIAJ) Ringtone	2× Platinum	500,000^{*}
South Korea Physical single	—	20,000
Streaming
Japan (RIAJ)	Platinum	100,000,000^{†}
^{*} Sales figures based on certification alone.^{†} Streaming-only figures based on certification alone.
