= No. 1 (BoA album) =

Studio album by BoA
- Released: April 12, 2002
- Recorded: 2001–2002
- Studio: SM Studios (Seoul)
- Genre: K-pop
- Length: 53:35
- Language: Korean
- Label: SM

BoA chronology
Listen to My Heart (2002)	No. 1 (2002)	Peace B. Remixes (2002)

Singles from No. 1
- 1. "No. 1" Released: April 12, 2002

No. 1 is the second Korean-language studio album (third overall) by South Korean recording artist BoA. The album's composition and arrangement was handled by several music collaborators, such as Yoo Young-jin, Kangta, Ahn Ik-soo, Sigurd Heimdal Rosnes, among others. Released through SM Entertainment on April 12, 2002, No. 1 marked BoA's return to South Korea following the release of her debut Japanese album Listen to My Heart a month prior, which saw widespread recognition in Japan.

No. 1 was a commercial success in South Korea, topping the monthly charts compiled by the Recording Industry Association of Korea (RIAK) for two consecutive months. It was the year's fourth best-selling album in the country, with sales of over 540,000 copies. In Japan, the album peaked at number 24 on the Oricon Albums Chart and sold over 14,000 copies.

The title track "No. 1" was released in conjunction with the album and received promotions on domestic music programs. It won various awards in South Korea, including the Most Popular Music Video (daesang) at the 2002 Mnet Music Video Festival and Grand Prize (daesang) at the 2002 SBS Gayo Daejeon.

== Background and release ==
No. 1 was released as BoA's second Korean-language studio album on April 12, 2002. There are only limited copies of the first pressing of the album which sold out just in weeks. The first press includes "No. 1 (Original Version)", "My Sweetie (Original Version)", and "Listen to my Heart (Big Chorus Version)". Later pressings of the album contain "No. 1 (Music Video Version)" and "My Sweetie (Corrected Version)" (featuring a slightly amended ending). The Japanese issue of No. 1 was released on June 1, 2002, and includes an exclusive bonus track "No. 1 (English Version)".

== Commercial performance ==
No. 1 experienced greater success in South Korea compared to her debut album ID; Peace B (2000). No. 1 debuted at number one on the monthly MIAK album chart with initial monthly sales of 232,626 in April 2002 and remained at number one the following month. The album was ranked at number four on the list of the best-selling albums in Korea for 2002, with reported sales of 544,853 that year. It also peaked at number 21 on the weekly Oricon Albums Chart in 2002.

== Track listing ==
No. 1 – Standard edition
No.	Title	Lyrics	Music	Arrangement	Length
1.	"No. 1"	Kim Young-ah	Sigurd Rosnes	Ahn Ik-soo	3:13
2.	"My Sweetie"	Yoo Young-jin	Yoo Young-jin	Yoo Young-jin	3:38
3.	"Waiting..." (Korean: 늘; RR: Neul])	Kangta	Kangta	Kangta	4:17
4.	"Tragic"	Ahn Ik-soo	Ahn Ik-soo	Ahn Ik-soo	3:50
5.	"Shy Love"	Bae Hwa-young	Ko Young-jo	Ko Young-jo	3:38
6.	"Day"	Son Nak-hee	Son Nak-hee	Son Nak-hee	4:13
7.	"Dear My Love..."	Lovee	Lovee	Kim Ho-hyun	4:03
8.	"Beat It" (Korean: 난; RR: Nan)	Kangta	Kangta	Kangta	3:30
9.	"P.O.L. (Power of Love)"	Nam So-young	S.Y.M.	S.Y.M.	5:15
10.	"My Genie"	Im Su-chul	Kang Won-seok	Kim Seon-yeop; Choi Woo-joon; Hyun Jae-wook	4:16
11.	"Pain-Love"	Yoo Chan-mo	Yoo Chan-mo	Yoo Chan-mo	3:42
12.	"Happiness Lies"	Park Jeong-ran	Benny Bellamacina; Bruce Elliot-Smith; Dennis Verrios; Jamie Hardwick; Jemma Joyce	Ahn Ik-soo	3:55
13.	"Realize (Stay with Me)"	BoA	BoA	Kim Ho-hyun	4:18
14.	"Azalea"	Gim Mi-sun	Gim Mi-sun	Gim Mi-sun	4:40
15.	"Listen to My Heart" (bonus track)	Jo Yoon-kyung	Hara Kazuhiro		3:55
Total length:					60:23

No. 1 – Japanese edition
No.	Title	Length
16.	"No. 1" (English version) (bonus track)

== Charts ==
=== Weekly charts ===
Chart (2002)	Peak position
Japanese Albums (Oricon)	21

=== Monthly charts ===
Chart (2002)	Peak position
South Korean Albums (RIAK)	1

=== Year-end charts ===
Chart (2002)	Position
South Korean Albums (RIAK)	4

== Sales ==
Sales for No. 1
Region	Sales amount
Japan	14,270
South Korea	560,326

== Release history ==
Release history for No. 1
Country	Date	Format(s)	Label	Ref.
South Korea	April 14, 2002	CD	SM Entertainment	
Japan	June 12, 2002	CD	Avex Trax	
Taiwan	June 12, 2002	CD	SM; Avex	

== See also ==
- List of best-selling albums in South Korea
