= Miracle (BoA album) =

Compilation album by BoA
- Released: September 24, 2002
- Recorded: 2002
- Genre: Pop
- Length: 48:38
- Label: SM

BoA chronology
Peace B. Remixes (2002)	Miracle (2002)	Valenti (2003)

Singles from Miracle
- 1. "Valenti" Released: September 24, 2002

Miracle is the second compilation album (marketed as a "special" album) by South Korean singer BoA, released through SM Entertainment on September 24, 2002. The album contains Korean versions of BoA's 2002 Japanese songs. The song "Every Heart" was first released in Japan and the Korean version is used as the end theme of anime Inuyasha.

== Commercial performance ==
Miracle debuted at number four on the MIAK monthly album charted in September 2002, selling 129,210 copies within a week. It placed at number 17 on the year-end album chart for 2002, selling 265,360 copies in South Korea.

== Promotion ==
BoA promoted the single "Valenti" on music programs in South Korea upon the release of Miracle. It received a first place music program award on Inkigayo on November 10, 2002.

== Track listing ==
Miracle track listing
No.	Title	Length
1.	"Destiny" (기적)	4:18
2.	"Every Heart"	4:32
3.	"Valenti"	3:32
4.	"Feelings Deep Inside" (마음은 전해진다)	4:24
5.	"Share Your Heart (With Me)"	4:34
6.	"Happiness"	4:35
7.	"Snow White"	4:22
8.	"Nobody But You"	4:10
9.	"Next Step"	4:56
10.	"Nothing's Gonna Change"	5:20
11.	"Listen to My Heart" (Bonus track)	3:55
Total length:		48:38

== Charts ==
=== Monthly charts ===
Chart (2002)	Peak position
South Korean Albums (RIAK)	4

=== Year-end charts ===
Chart (2002)	Position
South Korean Albums (RIAK)	17
