= Jumping into the World =

Jumping Into the World

Compilation album by BoA
- Released: March 8, 2001 (South Korea); May 29, 2002 (Japan)
- Recorded: 2001 (singles compilation)
- Genre: Pop
- Length: 48:12
- Labels: S.M. Entertainment (South Korea); Avex Trax (Japan)
- Producer: Lee Soo Man

BoA chronology
ID; Peace B (2000)	Jumping Into the World (2001)	Listen to My Heart (2002)

Jumping Into the World is the first special album (or 1.5 album) by South Korean singer BoA, released on March 8, 2001. It consisted of eight new tracks along English and Chinese versions of the songs "Don't Start Now", "사라 (SARA)", "ID; Peace B". In Korea, the album was titled Don't Start Now.

== Track listing ==
No.	Title	Length
1.	"Don't Start Now"	3:43
2.	"Again"	4:21
3.	"Destiny"	5:11
4.	"Love Letter"	4:03
5.	"Love Hurts"	3:08
6.	"Power"	3:04
7.	"Let U Go"	4:40
8.	"Don't Start Now (English Ver.)"	3:43
9.	"ID; Peace B (English Ver.)"	3:54
10.	"사라 (SARA) (English Ver.)"	3:48
11.	"Dreams Come True"	4:41
12.	"비밀일기 (I'm Sorry) (Chinese Ver.)"	4:47
13.	"ID; Peace B (Chinese Ver.)"	3:54
14.	"사라 (SARA) (Chinese Ver.)"	3:48
Total length:		48:12

== Charts ==
=== Weekly charts ===
Chart (2002)	Peak position
Japanese Albums (Oricon)	29

=== Monthly charts ===
Chart (2001)	Peak position
South Korean Albums (RIAK)	6

=== Year-end charts ===
Chart (2001)	Position
South Korean Albums (RIAK)	74

== Release history ==
Country	Date
South Korea	March 8, 2001
Japan	May 29, 2002
