= Jewel Song =

Jewel Song may refer to:

- Jewel Song / Beside You (Boku o Yobu Koe), a song by BoA
- "Ah! Je ris de me voir", from Charles Gounod's opera Faust "Air de bijoux"
- Alternative name for Facing the Music (1933 film), 1933 British musical comedy film
