= Valenti (album) =

Studio album by BoA
- Released: January 29, 2003
- Recorded: 2002–2003
- Studios: Avex Studio; Prime Sound Studio Form; Folio Sound; On Air Azabu Studio; Warner Music Studio; Bunkamura Studio; Supa Studio; Little Bach; Sunrise Studio; One Voice Studio; Sound City; Paradise Studio
- Genre: J-pop
- Length: 57:44
- Language: Japanese
- Label: Avex Trax
- Producers: Max Matsuura; Lee Soo-man; Ryuhei Chiba

BoA chronology
Miracle (2002)	Valenti (2003)	Atlantis Princess (2003)

Singles from Valenti
- 1. "Valenti" Released: August 28, 2002; 2. "Kiseki / No. 1" Released: September 19, 2002; 3. "Jewel Song / Beside You (Boku o Yobu Koe)" Released: December 11, 2002

Valenti is the second Japanese studio album (fourth overall) by South Korean recording artist BoA, released through Avex Trax on January 29, 2003. The album's lyrics were written by multiple contributors including Natsumi Watanabe and Kenn Kato, with composition on the album handled by a team of composers including Kazuhiro Hara, Bounceback, Kosuke Morimoto, Ken Harada, and Akira. Valenti is a pop record containing influences from R&B and dance music, and is primarily recorded in Japanese with minor interspersed phrases in English.

Valenti became a massive commercial success upon release. It became BoA's second consecutive number-one album on the Oricon Albums Chart, debuting at the top spot with first week sales of over 615,000 copies. The album managed to sell over 1.249 million copies and is her highest-selling album to date. It also became her second album to be certified million by the Recording Industry Association of Japan (RIAJ). Combined with the sales of its three physical singles, Valenti sold over 1.7 million copies during the year.

BoA promoted the album with three singles that were released throughout 2002: the title track, the double A-side single "Kiseki / No. 1" and the double A-side single "Jewel Song / Beside You (Boku o Yobu Koe)." All three releases peaked within the top three of the Oricon Singles Chart and received gold certifications in physical sales by the RIAJ. BoA promoted several tracks from the album in live television appearances in 2003. She embarked on her first concert tour in support of the album titled the Valenti Live Tour, which spanned nine concerts across three cities in Japan.

== Commercial performance ==
Valenti topped the weekly Japanese Oricon Albums Chart with first week sales of 615,218 copies. It marked BoA's second number one studio album in Japan, following her debut album, Listen to My Heart (2002); her next four studios albums would also rank atop the chart, with her sixth Japanese album The Face (2008) setting a record for the second-most number one albums by a solo artist in the country. Valenti remained atop the chart for a second week, selling 20,000 copies more than the second place album, Glay Rare Collectives Vol. 1, which was released the week after Valenti. It ranked first on the Oricon monthly chart in February 2003. The album was the fifth best-selling album in Japan for 2003, and was also the year's second highest-selling album by a female artist behind Ayumi Hamasaki's Rainbow. Valenti remains the singer's best-selling album to date.

In South Korea, the album was released under license on February 25, 2004, following the South Korean government's fourth opening of Japan's culture, and prior to that, most of the songs on this album were translated into Korean and included in the special album Shine We Are!. Valenti peaked at number one on the international monthly album chart compiled by the Music Industry Association of Korea (MIAK) in February 2004, becoming her first record to top the international chart. It was the 26th best-selling international album in South Korea during 2004, selling 17,958 copies.

== Accolades ==
Valenti won Best Rock & Pop Album of the Year at the annual Japan Gold Disc Awards, marking her second consecutive win in the category after Listen to My Heart (2002). At the 2003 MTV Video Music Awards Japan, the single "Valenti" received a nomination for Best Pop Video, but lost to "One Love" by English boy band Blue.

== Track listing ==
Valenti – Standard edition
No.	Title	Lyrics	Music	Arrangement	Length
1.	"Valenti"	Chinka Yasushi	Kazuhiro Hara	Kazuhiro Hara	4:18
2.	"Jewel Song"	Natsumi Watanabe	Kazuhiro Hara	Kazuhiro Hara	5:27
3.	"B.I.O"	Kenn Kato	Kosuke Morimoto	Akira	4:17
4.	"Sekai no Katasumi de (世界の片隅で, lit. In a Corner of the World)"	Narumi Yamamoto	Dansyu Goya	Manao Doi	4:25
5.	"Kiseki (奇蹟, lit. Miracle)"	Natsumi Watanabe	Kosuke Morimoto	Ken Matsubara	4:20
6.	"Winding Road" (featuring Dabo)	Dabo; Emi K. Lynn	Miyake Mitsuyuki	Minami Shiyunsuke	4:31
7.	"Searching for Truth"	Kenn Kato	Face2Fake	Face2Fake	4:00
8.	"Moon & Sunrise"	BoA; Natsumi Watanabe	Ken Matsubara	Ken Matsubara	5:14
9.	"Discovery"	Natsumi Watanabe	Ken Harada	Ken Harada	4:50
10.	"Flower"	Ryoushi Sonoda	Bounceback	Akira	4:24
11.	"Beside You: Boku wo Yobu Koe (Beside You -僕を呼ぶ声-, lit. Beside You: (The Voice That Calls Me))"	Natsumi Watanabe	Bounceback	H•wonder	4:23
12.	"Feel the Same"	Shoko Fujibayash	Akira	Akira	4:41
13.	"No. 1"	Ryoju Sonoda	Sigurd Rosnes	Iksoo Ahn	3:14
Total length:					58:04

Valenti – DVD
No.	Title	Length
1.	"Listen to My Heart" (Video clip)
2.	"Valenti" (Video clip)

== Charts ==
=== Weekly charts ===
Chart (2003)	Peak position
Japanese Albums (Oricon)	1

=== Monthly charts ===
Chart (2003–2004)	Peak position
Japanese Albums (Oricon)	1
South Korean Int'l Albums (MIAK)	1

=== Year-end charts ===
Chart (2003)	Position
Japanese Albums (Oricon)	5

Chart (2004)	Position
South Korean Int'l Albums (MIAK)	26

=== Decade-end charts ===
Chart (2000–2009)	Position
Japanese Albums (Oricon)	61

=== All-time charts ===
Chart	Position
Japanese Albums (Oricon)	191

== Sales and certifications ==
Region	Certification	Certified units/sales
Japan (RIAJ)	Million	1,249,197
South Korea	—	17,958

== Release history ==
Region	Date	Format	Label
Japan	January 29, 2003	CD	Avex Trax
Japan	January 29, 2003	CD & DVD	Avex Trax
South Korea	February 24, 2004	CD	Avex Inc.; SM Entertainment
