= Tokyo International Forum =

Multi-purpose exhibition center in Tokyo, Japan

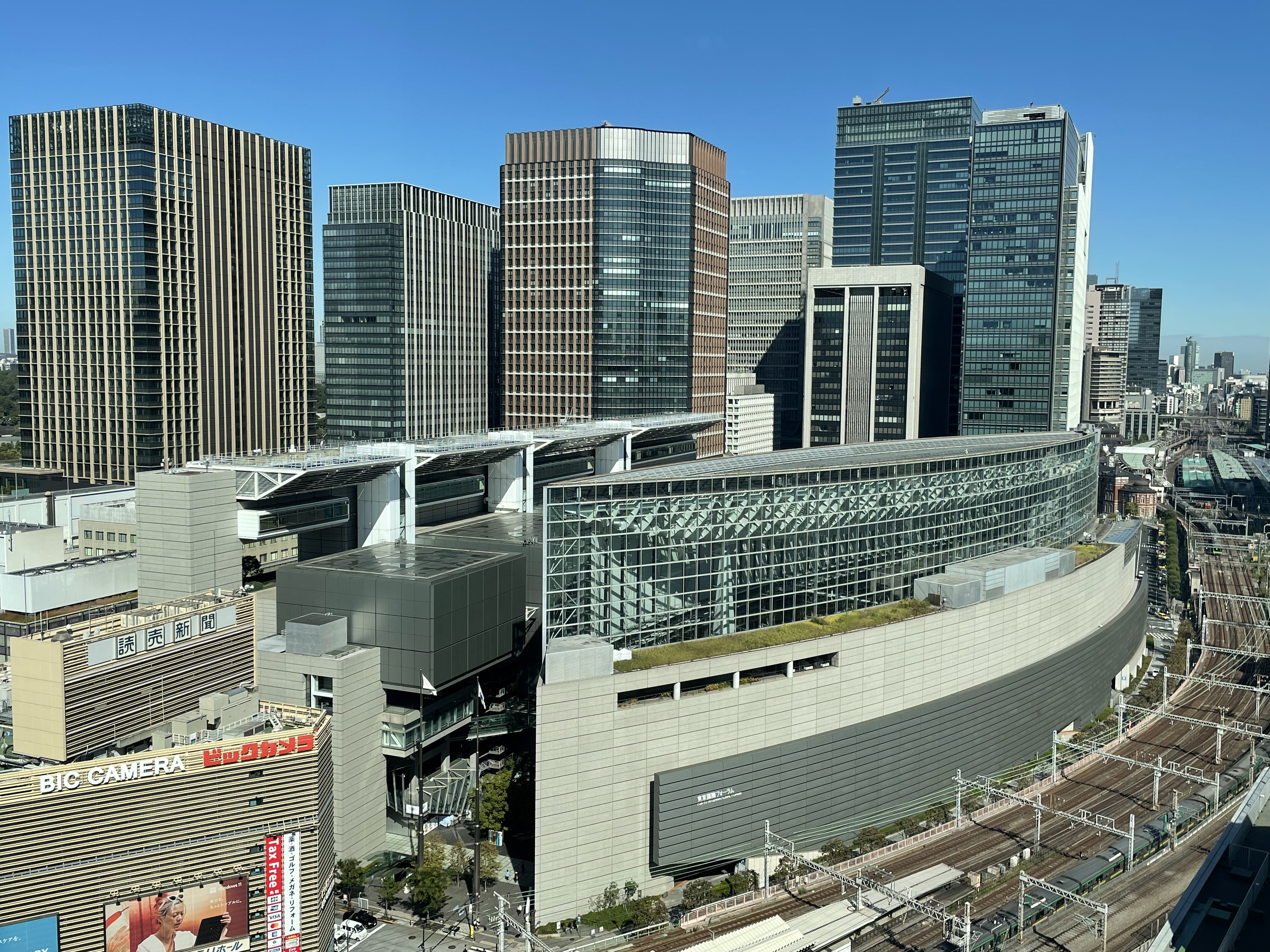
- Exterior of Tokyo International Forum
- Interactive map of Tokyo International Forum
- Location: Chiyoda, Tokyo, Japan
- Coordinates: 35°40′37″N 139°45′51″E
- Operator: Tokyo International Forum, Co., LTD
- Public transit: JR East: Yamanote Line and Keihin-Tōhoku Line at Yūrakuchō

Construction
- Built: 1996
- Opened: 1997
- Architect: Rafael Viñoly Architects

Website
- www.t-i-forum.co.jp/en/

The Tokyo International Forum (東京国際フォーラム, Tōkyō Kokusai Fōramu) is a multi-purpose exhibition center in Tokyo, Japan. The complex is generally considered to be in the Yūrakuchō business district, being adjacent to Yūrakuchō Station, but it is administratively in the Marunouchi district.

Tokyo International Forum was built on the site of the Old City Hall, the former government headquarters which was relocated to the Tokyo Metropolitan Government Building in Nishi-Shinjuku.

== Background ==
One of its halls seats 5,000. In addition to seven other halls, it includes exhibition space, a lobby, restaurants, shops, and other facilities.

Designed by architect Rafael Viñoly and completed in 1996, it features swooping curves of steel truss and glass; the outside is shaped like an elongated boat.

Standing between Tokyo Station and Yūrakuchō Station, its address is in Marunouchi, Chiyoda, on the site formerly occupied by Tokyo City Hall (before it moved to the Tokyo Metropolitan Government Building in 1991).

On the first floor, facing in the direction of Edo Castle (now the Imperial Palace), is a bronze sculpture of Ōta Dōkan.

== Selected events ==
- 7 December 1999: Draw for the preliminary competition of the 2002 FIFA World Cup in Korea and Japan
- 2005: La Folle Journée au Japon
- 2007: Muse: Black Holes and Revelations Tour
- 2008: BoA Live Tour 2008 -The Face-
- 2011: International Union of Architects world congress
- 2012: World Bank and IMF Annual Meetings
- 2014: International Bar Association congress
- 2015: Ariana Grande, The Honeymoon Tour
- 2016: Selena Gomez, Revival Tour
- 2016: Michael Schenker, as part of a show called "Michael Schenker Fest", which saw the guitarist reunited on stage with all 3 singers he worked with during the 1980s (Gary Barden, Graham Bonnet, and Robin McAuley), as well as several musicians from the same era, as well. A CD/DVD of the concert was issued a year later, Michael Schenker Fest "Live" Tokyo.
- 2017: Park Bo-gum, "Oh Happy Day": 2016-2017 Asia Fan Meeting Tour
- 2017: Shawn Mendes, Illuminate World Tour
- 21 December 2019: Teppen World Championship 2019 finals
- 2021: Weightlifting venue for the 2020 Summer Olympics
- 2021: Powerlifting venue for the 2020 Summer Paralympics
- 2021: Kōhaku Uta Gassen television special
- 13 March 2022: Hiroyuki Sawano's solo live "Hiroyuki Sawano LIVE [nZk]007"
- 30 July 2023: Koda Kumi's "LIVE TOUR 2023 ~angeL+monsteR"

== Planned Renovation ==
On January 1, 2029, the Tokyo International Forum will close for 15 months to undergo large-scale renovation work. During this time, entry and passage through the premises will not be permitted. The closure is expected to last until March 31, 2030, although the exact period is subject to change depending on construction progress.

== Gallery ==
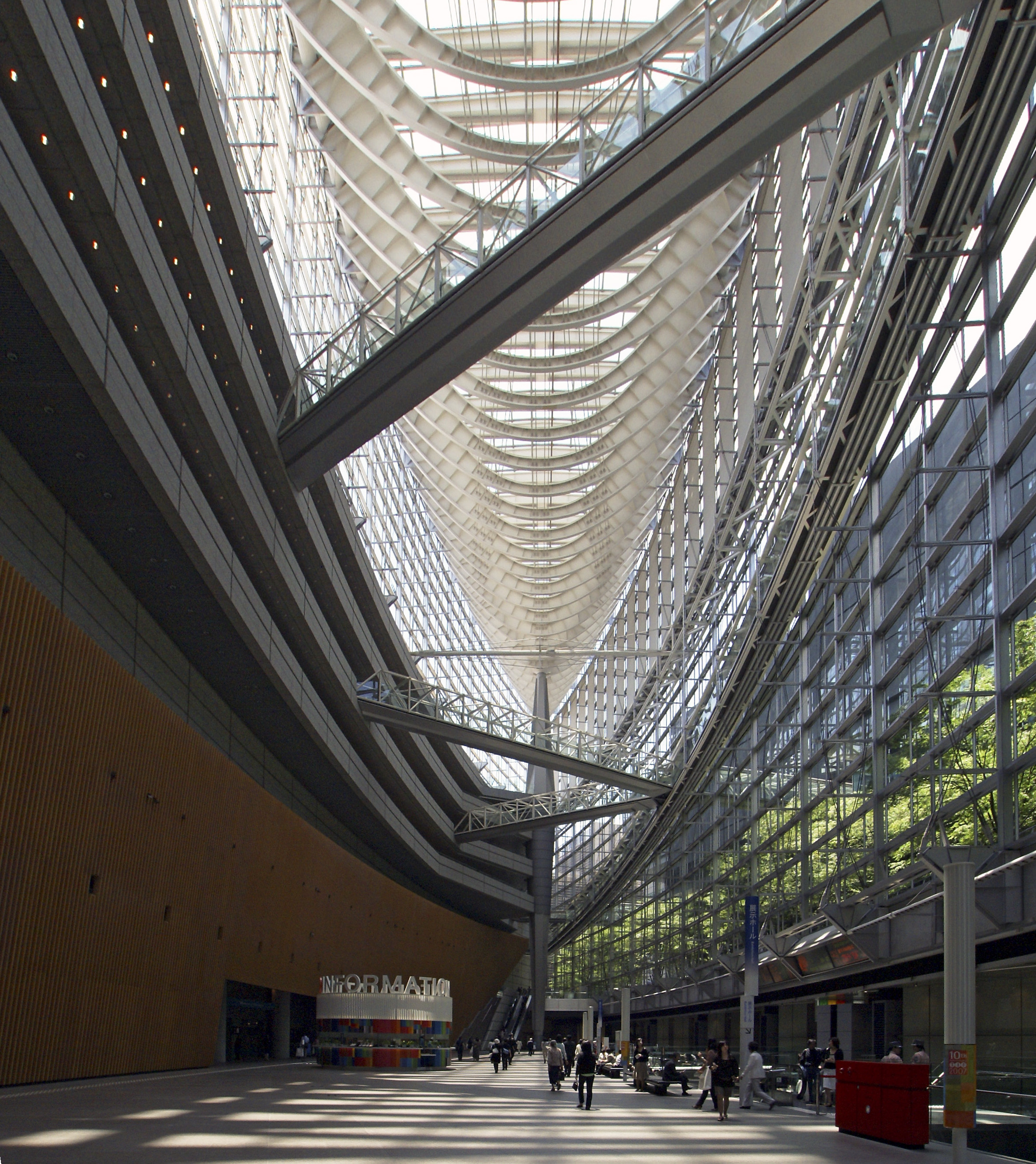
Interior of Tokyo International Forum

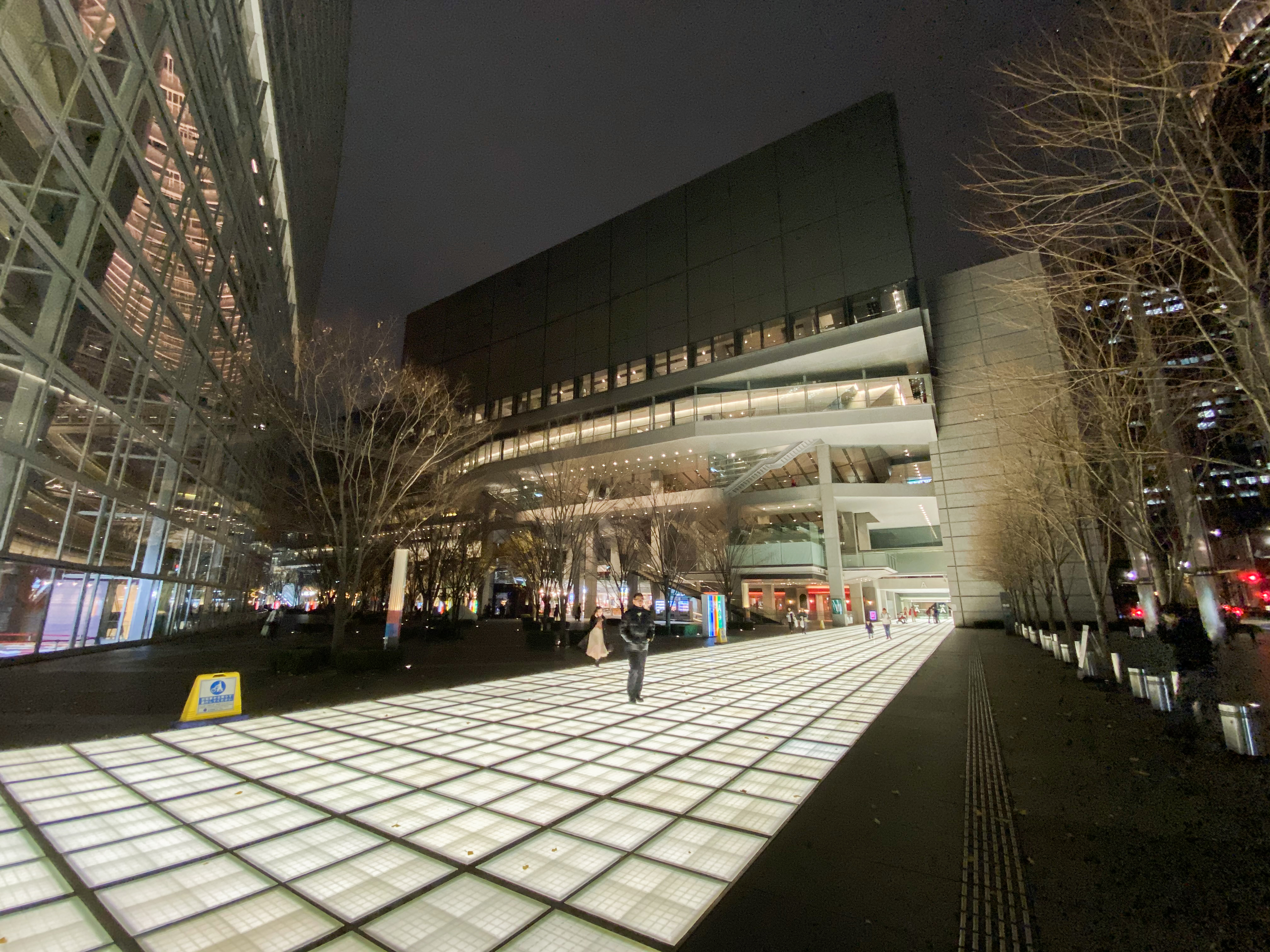
Hall A and Tokyo International Forum Side Square

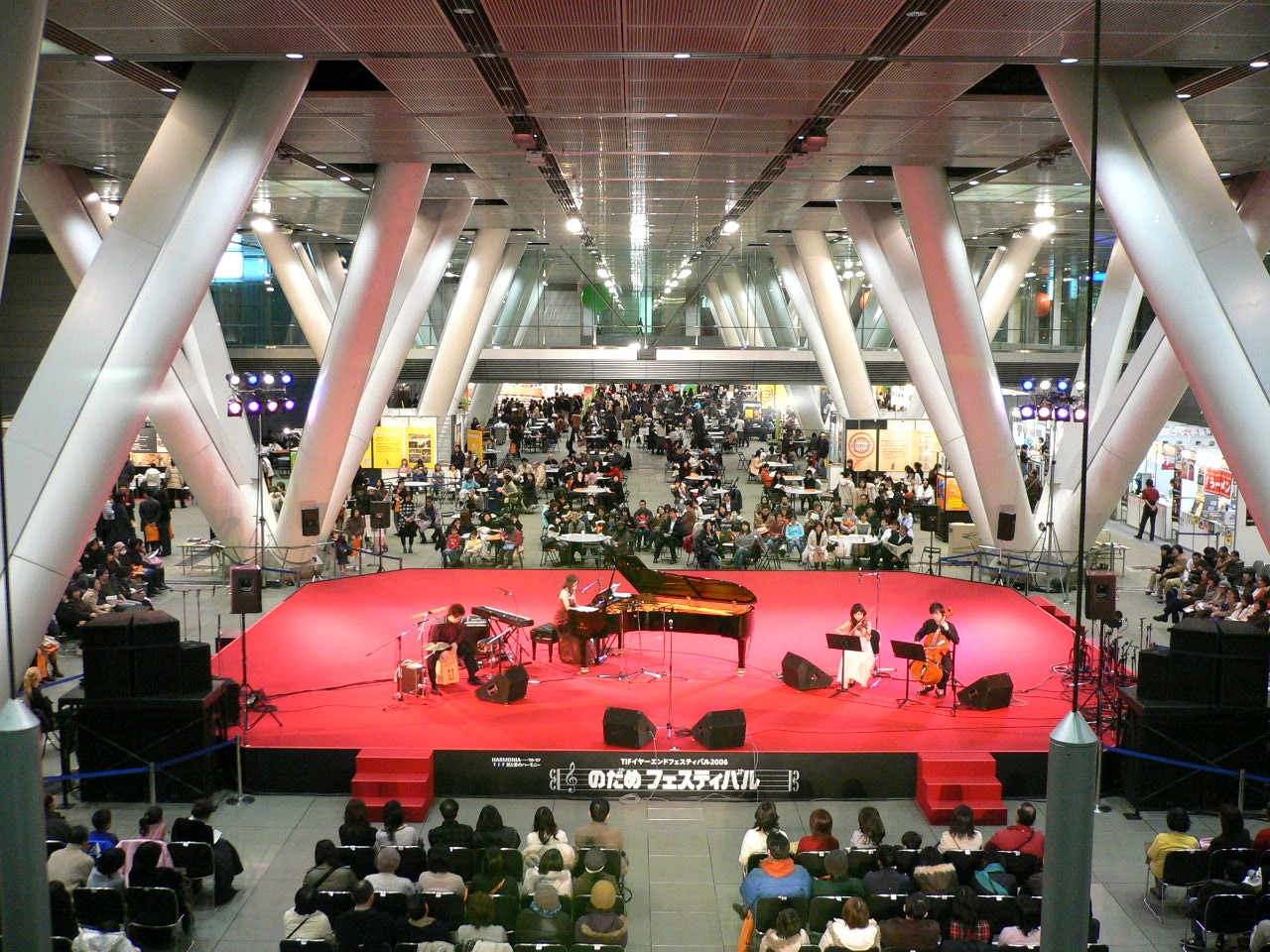
The Tokyo International Forum in use, 2013

The interior of Tokyo International Forum with people, 2021
