= K-pop Selection =

Compilation album by BoA
- Released: March 3, 2004
- Recorded: 2000–2003
- Genre: Pop
- Length: 54:00
- Label: Avex Trax
- Producer: Lee Soo Man

BoA chronology
Love & Honesty (2004)	K-pop Selection (2004)	My Name (2004)

K-pop Selection is the first Japanese compilation album by BoA, released on March 3, 2004. It is a collection of her Korean songs released in Japan (in their original Korean versions). It also had a "Perfect Edition" that came with several music videos.

== Track listing ==
=== Normal edition ===
1. No. 1 3:12
2. Milky Way 3:19
3. Listen to My Heart 3:57
4. Time To Begin 3:36
5. ID; Peace B 3:58
6. My Sweetie 3:37
7. Day 4:13
8. Don't Start Now 3:43
9. Atlantis Princess 3:44
10. Realize (Stay With Me) 4:17
11. Sara 3:53
12. Where Are You 3:47
13. Come to Me 3:35
14. Waiting 4:17
15. The Lights Of Seoul 4:26
16. Amazing Kiss (Korean Ver.) 4:29
17. Jewel Song (Korean Ver.) 5:22

=== Perfect edition ===
DVD included:

1. No.1
2. Atlantis Princess
3. Milky Way
