= Milky Way (BoA song) =

2003 single by BoA

Single by BoA

from the album Atlantis Princess
- Language: Korean; Japanese
- Released: May 30, 2003
- Recorded: 2003
- Length: 3:20
- Label: SM; Avex
- Songwriter: Kenzie
- Producer: Kenzie

BoA singles chronology
"Atlantis Princess" (2003)	"Milky Way" (2003)	"Double" (2003)

Music video
- "Milky Way" on YouTube

"Milky Way" is a song recorded by South Korean singer BoA from her third studio album, Atlantis Princess, released through SM Entertainment on May 30, 2003. The song was composed, written, and arranged by SM songwriter Kenzie.

== Background and release ==
"Milky Way" was released as the third single from BoA's third studio album, Atlantis Princess, on May 30, 2003. It followed the promotional single "The Lights of Seoul" and the title track "Atlantis Princess". BoA recorded the song in Japanese as "Milky Way ~Kimi No Uta~" for her 10th Japanese single "Double", which was released on October 22, 2003. The Korean release of "Double" includes a club remix version of "Milky Way".

== Usage in media ==
The Japanese version of "Milky Way" was used as the theme song for TV Tokyo's coverage of the 2003 Rugby World Cup, which was held in October and November.

== Release history ==
Release dates and formats for "Milky Way"
Region	Date	Label	Ref.
South Korea	May 30, 2003	SM Entertainment	
Japan	October 22, 2003	SM Entertainment; Avex Trax	

== Red Velvet version ==
"Milky Way"

Promotional single by Red Velvet
- Language: Korean
- Released: August 21, 2020
- Recorded: 2020
- Studio: SM Studios (Seoul)
- Genre: Jazz
- Length: 3:38
- Label: SM; Dreamus
- Songwriter: Kenzie
- Producer: Kenzie

Music video
- "Milky Way" on YouTube

Audio sample
- 30-second sample: file; help

"Milky Way" is a remake song recorded by South Korean girl group Red Velvet. It was originally recorded by BoA for her album Atlantis Princess (2003). It remade by the group as part of SM Station's tribute project in celebration of BoA's 20th anniversary. It was released as Red Velvet's sixth digital single on August 21, 2020, marking their first release with member Wendy who was hospitalized after a stage accident in December 2019.

=== Background and composition ===
On August 19, 2020, SM Entertainment announced that Red Velvet would be the fourth runner for SM Station 'Our Beloved BoA'. "Milky Way" was originally recorded and released by BoA in 2003 from her third Korean studio album Atlantis Princess. In addition, Wendy, who had a hiatus from group activities due to injury, participated in the song for the first time in about eight months.

Musically, "Milky Way" is described as a combination of "colorful acappella and jazz scat with harmonious vocals". The song is composed in the key of A♭ Major with a tempo of 98 beat-per-minute. The song was produced and written by Kenzie, who worked on the original song, and arranged the song herself to recreate it into a "fresh jazz pop" song. Lyrically, the song tells a story of unfolding a "dark night" with someone just like a "milky way".

=== Credits and personnel ===
Credits adapted from Melon.

- Red Velvet (Irene, Seulgi, Wendy, Joy, Yeri) – vocals, background vocals
- Kenzie – background vocals
- Choi Hoon – bass
- Hong Joon-ho – guitar
- Song Young-joo – piano
- No Min-ji (SM Yellow Tail Studio) – recording engineer
- Lee Chang-sun (prelude studio) – recording engineer
- Jung Yu-ra – digital editing
- Kang Eun-ji (SM SSAM Studio) – mixing engineer
- Kim Chul-soon (SM Blue Ocean Studio) – mixing engineer
- Kwon Nam-woo (821 Sound Mastering) – mastering

=== Track listing ===
Digital download / streaming

1. "Milky Way" – 3:38
2. "Milky Way" (Instrumental) – 3:38

=== Charts ===
Weekly charts
Chart (2020)	Peak position
South Korea (Gaon)	119
South Korea (K-pop Hot 100)	64

=== Release history ===
Release dates and formats for "Milky Way"
Region	Date	Format	Label	Ref.
Various	August 21, 2020	Digital download, streaming	SM Entertainment; Dreamus	
