= Quincy (song) =

"Quincy / Kono Yo no Shirushi"

Single by BoA

from the album Best of Soul
- Released: 1 September 2004
- Genre: J-pop; dance-pop
- Label: Avex Trax
- Songwriter(s): Marcus Dernulf; Chinfa Kan; Jan Lysdahl; Harry Sommerdahl; Samuel Waermoe

BoA singles chronology
"Be the One" (2004)	"Quincy / Kono Yo no Shirushi" (2004)	"Meri Kuri" (2004)

"Quincy / Kono Yo no Shirushi" is BoA's 13th Japanese single. "Kono Yo no Shirushi" is the song featured on Calpis commercial. This single was not included on any of her full studio albums but was on her best selling compilation album Best of Soul, which was also her second highest selling album.

== Track listing ==
1. Quincy
2. Kono Yo no Shirushi (コノヨノシルシ)
3. Quincy (Instrumental)
4. Kono Yo no Shirushi (コノヨノシルシ) (Instrumental)

== Charts ==
Release	Chart	Peak position	Sales total
1 September 2004	Oricon Weekly Singles Chart	4	82,614
