= Monkey Typhoon =

Japanese franchise

- First tankōbon volume cover, featuring Goku

アソボット戦記五九 (Assobotto Senki Gokū)
- Created by: Avex Inc.
- Manga

Assobot Goku
- Written by: Jōji Arimori
- Illustrated by: Romu Aoi
- Published by: Kodansha
- Magazine: Weekly Shōnen Magazine (2001–2002); Magazine Special (2002–2003)
- Original run: December 26, 2001 – October 20, 2003
- Volumes: 7
- Anime television series
- Directed by: Mamoru Hamatsu
- Produced by: Fukashi Azuma; Yuma Sakata; Kazuo Jibiki
- Written by: Hiroshi Hashimoto (1–20); Rika Nakase (21–36); Shin Kibayashi (21–52)
- Studio: Studio Egg
- Original network: TV Tokyo
- Original run: October 1, 2002 – September 30, 2003
- Episodes: 52
- icon

Monkey Typhoon, known in Japan as Assobot Robot Goku (Japanese: アソボット戦記五九, Hepburn: Assobotto Senki Gokū; lit. 'The War Chronicles of Goku the Assobot'), is a Japanese mixed-media project created by Avex Inc., consisting of a manga series and an anime television series. The project was first announced in June 2000, under the tentative title Son Gokū no Bōken (孫悟空の冒険; 'Son Goku Adventure'), with collaboration of writer Yoshimi Ishikawa. The series is loosely based on the 16th century novel Journey to the West.

The manga series, Assobot Goku, was written by Shin Kibayashi (under the pen name Jōji Arimori) and illustrated by Romu Aoi, serialized in Kodansha's shōnen manga magazine Weekly Shōnen Magazine from 2001 to 2002, with its chapters collected in seven tankōbon volumes. The 52-episode anime television series was animated by studio Egg and broadcast on TV Tokyo from October 2002 to September 2003.

== Story ==
Monkey Typhoon tells the story of three assobots (アソボット, assobotto)—a form of robots whose general title is a portmanteau of the words association and robot— Goku, Tongo, and Joe. They are assisted in their journeys by Sanzo, a human, the son of the creator of the assobots, and Suzie, who joined them after her father was cured from the Destruction Virus. Later on they are joined by their former rivals Miyon and Shiyon. Their quest is to stop their world's destruction by collecting the legendary 49 keys to unlock Tokyo Metropolitan Government. Along the way, the assobots gain the ability to evolve further. Together, in their many voyages, they come across several foes and enemies such as Loki, Ryutaro Demon, the Quartet, King Doberman Pinscher, and many more, as well as grow united in their friendship.

== Characters ==
Goku (五九)
Voiced by: Kappei Yamaguchi
Goku is a first-generation assobot whose primary mission is to locate the 49 Keys of the Apocalypse, which he believes will lead to a great treasure. His companions include Suzie, Sanzo, Tongo, Joe, and later Meeyon and Shiyon. While largely humanoid, his face is distinctly simian, a trait about which he is sensitive. He wields a magic metal "joystick" that extends at will and rides a robotic horse named Skywalker. Sanzo places a curse on him, making him physically vulnerable to women and children. After collecting six keys, his appearance changes and he gains new abilities like the "Easter Wind" and "Fire Vortex Revolution". His name, Goku, is derived from the characters for "five" and "nine".
Sanzo Genjo (玄奘三蔵, Genjō Sanzō)
Voiced by: Tomokazu Seki
Sanzo, who awoke from a thousand-year cold sleep to prevent global destruction by collecting the 49 Keys, forces Goku on this quest, promising to remove his curse only upon reaching the final city. He wields a magical harmonica that can control, heal, and power up most assobots, though it is initially ineffective on those infected with the Destruction Virus. After he collects six keys, the harmonica's appearance changes and it gains the power to heal infected assobots. He acts as a brotherly figure to Suzie and was once the lover of Rhea, the mother of all assobots.
Suzie (スージィ, Sūjī)
Voiced by: Mayumi Iizuka
Suzie joins the quest after losing her father in an attack by infected assobots, seeking to witness the legend he once told her. Though lacking innate abilities, she operates a flying vehicle and later discovers a unique bow that emits a sound affecting assobots, a weapon only she can wield. With this bow, she ultimately uses the Bow of the Sun to peacefully lay Ryutaro Demon's soul to rest, being the only one who understands his anguish. She chooses to return to the past with Goku and the rest of the group.
Joe (ジョー, Jō)
Voiced by: Nozomu Sasaki
A worker assobot, his face is perpetually covered in a ninja-style mask. He requires significant amounts of water to survive and is considered invincible in underwater combat, wielding a weapon known as the Feather Sword. After collecting six keys, his appearance transforms and his weapon evolves into the Feather Blade. He holds to the principle that the bandit group should never abandon each other, a belief that leads him to return to the past alongside Goku and their companions.
Tongo (トンゴー, Tongō)
Voiced by: Takeharu Kunimoto
A nurse assobot who resembles a portly feline with a fondness for eating. His primary weapon is the Chain Hammer. After collecting six keys, his appearance alters and his weapon transforms into the more powerful Megaton Hammer. He participates in the final battle against Ryutaro Demon alongside Goku and their allies. Adhering to the bandit group's principle of loyalty, he accompanies them on their journey back to the past.
Meeyon (魅音, Mion)
Voiced by: Minami Takayama
Meeyon is a nearly human-looking assobot who later joins Goku's group. Sanzo observes her resemblance to Rhea. She travels on a transforming pet named Saati, which becomes her hoverboard, and employs candy-based attacks like bubblegum bombs. After collecting six keys, she acquires a magical umbrella capable of flight, defense, and hypnosis. In the final confrontation, she and her sister, Shiyon, are instrumental in discovering Ryutaro Demon's weakness. The sisters ultimately choose to travel to the past with Goku and the others.
Shiyon (紫苑, Shion)
Voiced by: Atsuko Enomoto
Meeyon's little sister. Like Meeyon, she is an assobot and one of Ryutaro Demon's quartet. During her time as part of the quartet she used a Sitar played like a cello. She joined Goku so she can spy them in their journey. After she died due to the Destruction Virus, Sanzo revived her after his harmonica is changed by the 6 keys. She can transform or change into a pretty lady who looks like Meeyon, only with blue hair. She has a pet parrot that can transform into a walkie-talkie.
Yazu (ヤズー, Yazū)
Voiced by: Shin-ichiro Miki
He is a third generation assobot. He is one of Ryutaro Demon's quartet. He dies but later gets revived in episode 33. Yazu is also armed with an elegantly designed scythe. He sacrificed himself for the group when he disagreed with Ryutaro Demon's plans in the last part of the series.
Rei (零)
The mother of all assobots and former lover of Sanzo 1000 years before the series started. According to Sanzo, she has similarities with Meeyon but Sanzo stated that he can see Rei more on Goku than on Meeyon.
Ryutaro Demon (出門龍太郎, Demon Ryūtarō)
Voiced by: Nachi Nozawa
The main villain. He is the rival of Kuzo Genjo (玄奘久造, Genjō Kuzō). Like Sanzo, he wants to find the keys for his sinister plans.
Casper
Voiced by: Jūrōta Kosugi
One of Ryutaro Demon's quartet. He has a violin.
Marty
One of Ryutaro Demon's quartet. He has a trumpet.
Marie
Voiced by: Chiemi Chiba
One of Ryutaro Demon's quartet. She has a set of drums.

== Media ==
=== Manga ===
Written by Shin Kibayashi (under the pen name Jōji Arimori) and illustrated by Romu Aoi, the manga series Assobot Goku (アソボット五九, Assobotto Gokū) started in Kodansha's shōnen manga magazine Weekly Shōnen Magazine on December 26, 2001. It was later transferred to Magazine Special, where it ran from September 20, 2002, to October 20, 2003. Kodansha collected its chapters in seven tankōbon volumes, released from September 17, 2002, to November 17, 2003.

=== Anime ===
Produced by Avex Inc., Dentsu and TV Tokyo, animated by studio Egg and directed by Mamoru Hamatsu, Monkey Typhoon was broadcast for 52 episodes on TV Tokyo from October 1, 2002, to September 30, 2003.

==== Theme songs ====
Opening themes

1. "Beside You: Boku o Yobu Koe" (Beside You: 僕を呼ぶ声) by BoA (1–25)
2. "Wo Ai Ni" (我愛你) by Dream (26–52)

Ending themes

1. "I Wake Your Love" by Move (1–13)
2. "Kasumi Yuku Sora Se ni Shite" (霞ゆく空背にして) by Janne Da Arc (14–25)
3. "Burning Dance" by Move (26–38)
4. "LolitA☆Strawberry in summer" by Sweets (39–51)
5. "Assobot Senki Goku no Sekai" (アソボット戦記五九のせかい) (52)
