= Shine We Are! / Earthsong =

Single by BoA

from the album Love & Honesty and Shine We Are!
- Released: May 14, 2003
- Recorded: 2003
- Genre: J-pop; dance-pop
- Label: Avex Trax

BoA singles chronology
| "Jewel Song / Beside You: Boku o Yobu Koe" (2002) | "Shine We Are! / Earthsong" (2003) | "Double" (2003) |

"Shine We Are! / Earthsong" is BoA's ninth Japanese single and was one of the top 100 Japanese singles in 2003 according to the Oricon chart from December 2, 2002 to November 24, 2003.

== Track listing ==
1. Shine We Are!
2. Earthsong
3. Valenti (Junior Vasquez Radio Mix, English Version)
4. Shine We Are! (Instrumental)
5. Earthsong (Instrumental)

== Charts ==
| Chart | Peak position | Sales total |
|---|---|---|
| Oricon Singles Chart (Japan) | 2 | 144,264 |
