= Atlantis Princess (song) =

Single by BoA

from the album Atlantis Princess
- Released: May 30, 2003
- Recorded: 2003
- Studio: SM Digital Recording Studios (Seoul)
- Genre: Pop; dance
- Length: 3:44
- Label: SM
- Lyricist: Tae-hoon
- Producer: Hwang Sung-jae

BoA singles chronology
"Lights of Seoul" (2003)	"Atlantis Princess" (2003)	"Milky Way" (2003)

Music video
- "Atlantis Princess" on YouTube

"Atlantis Princess" (Korean: 아틀란티스 소녀; RR: Ateullantiseu sonyeo; lit. 'Atlantis Girl') is a song by South Korean recording artist BoA for her third Korean studio album of the same name. It was released via SM Entertainment as part of the album on May 30, 2003. Produced by Hwang Sung-jae with lyrics penned by Tae-hoon, the song is a pop and dance number with lyrics revolving around pursuing one's dreams and aspirations.

"Atlantis Princess" was subject to generally positive reviews from music critics, and has retrospectively been included on several critics lists of the best K-pop songs of all time. It was successful in South Korea, ranking at number one on the music program charts for multiple consecutive weeks.

The music video for "Atlantis Princess" was filmed two weeks prior to the release of the album. It was shot in various locations in New South Wales, Australia and features BoA singing and dancing whilst sporting goggles atop a skyscraper and amidst a grassy hill overlooking the ocean. The song won Best Dance Performance at the 2003 Mnet Music Video Festival.

== Background and release ==
"Atlantis Princess" was composed by Hwang Sung-jae and is a fast-tempo dance song. Its lyrics are reminiscent of a fairy-tale and depicts the lost continent of Atlantis whilst expressing a bright and hopeful message.

== Music video and promotion ==
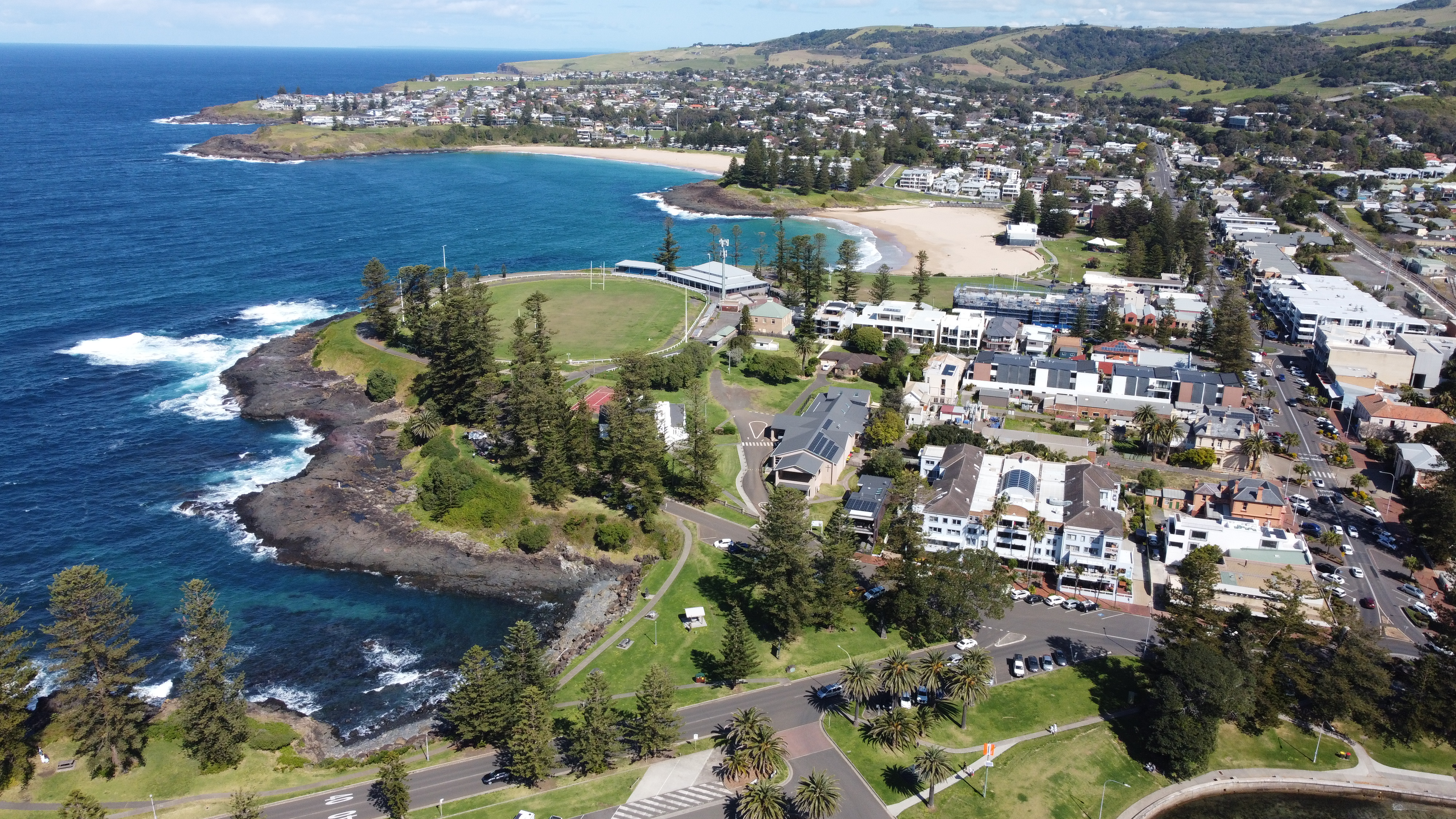
The music video was shot in New South Wales, Australia (pictured).

BoA travelled to Australia from May 17–23, 2003, to film the music video. The video sees BoA sporting goggles whilst singing and dancing in several locations in Australia, including on a rooftop of a skyscraper in Sydney in addition to a grassy meadow and a sandy beach in Kiama, New South Wales. BoA performed the song on live television for the first time on Inkigayo on June 1.

== Critical reception ==
In 2021, "Atlantis Princess" was ranked number 93 in Melon and Seoul Shinmun's list of Top 100 K-pop Songs of All Time. Rhian Daily of The Forty-Five ranked it as the best K-pop song of all time in 2023, opining that although BoA has recorded multiple songs that "could fight for the position of K-pop's best ever", "Atlantis Princess" "is her best—warm, creative and fun".

=== Accolades ===
"Atlantis Princess" won Best Dance Performance at the 2003 Mnet Music Video Festival, beating Lee Hyori's "10 Minutes".

Awards and nominations
Year	Organization	Award	Result	Ref.
2003	Mnet Music Video Festival	Best Dance Performance	Won	
2003	Mnet Music Video Festival	Best Female Artist	Nominated	

Music program awards
Program	Date
Inkigayo	June 22, 2003
Inkigayo	July 6, 2003
Inkigayo	July 13, 2003
Music Camp	June 28, 2003
Music Camp	July 12, 2003
Music Camp	July 19, 2003

== Covers ==
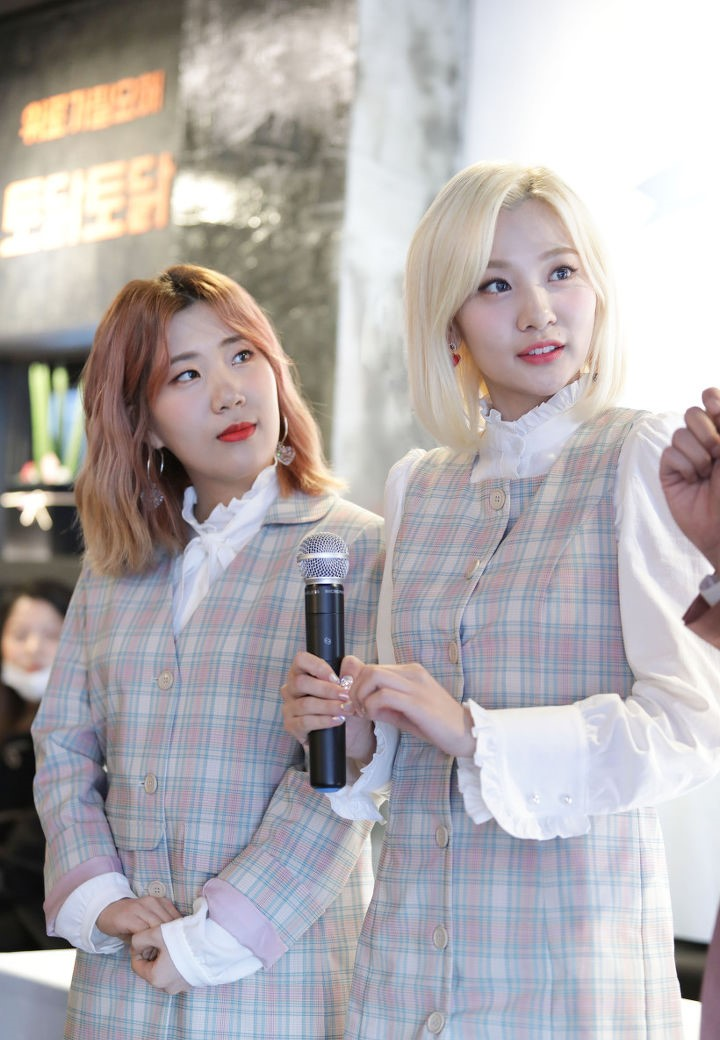
Various artists have covered "Atlantis Princess", including Bolbbalgan4 in 2020

"Atlantis Princess" has been covered by various K-pop artists since its release. In May 2016, Taeyeon recorded a remake of the song for her advertisement of mobile game Sword and Magic, although the game did not officially release it due to undisclosed reasons. GFriend's Eunha performed a cover of the song on the year-end episode of M Countdown in 2019. In August 2020, Bolbbalgan4 released a cover version of the song as part of Our Beloved BoA #2 – SM Station, which reached number 36 on the Gaon Digital Chart and number 26 on the K-pop Hot 100. Boy group Golden Child performed it at KCON 2018 in Japan.

On December 5, 2020, boy group DKB performed "Atlantis Princess" on Immortal Songs 2, and several members of Iz*One covered it at the 2020 Mnet Asian Music Awards the following day. In July 2021, I-dle's Miyeon and Woodz performed the song during a summer special stage on M Countdown. Mamamoo sang the song on Music Universe K-909 hosted by BoA in 2022, with member Solar expressing how she was a big fan of her before debuting. On December 31, 2022, Nmixx covered the song at the MBC Gayo Daejejeon and reprised the cover on Show! Music Core on January 14, 2023.
