= Peace B. Remixes =

Peace B Remixes

Remix album by BoA
- Released: August 7, 2002
- Recorded: 2001–2002
- Genre: Pop
- Label: Avex Trax
- Producer: Lee Soo Man

BoA chronology
No. 1 (2002)	Peace B Remixes (2002)	Miracle (2002)

Peace B. Remixes is BoA's first Japanese remix album.

== Track listing ==
1. "Listen to My Heart" (Akira's Un Momento Remix)
2. "Amazing Kiss" (Thunderpuss Japanese Club Mix)
3. "Every Heart" —ﾐﾝﾅﾉｷﾓﾁ— (Groove That Soul Mix)
4. "Power" (Masters of Funk Remix)
5. "ID; Peace B" (Shinichi Osawa Remix)
6. "Share Your Heart" (With Me) [Dub7s Lovers Rock Remix]
7. "Don't Start Now" (Two Main Guys Mix)
8. "Kimochi wa Tsutawaru (気持ちはつたわる)" (L12 Remix featuring Rude Boy Face)
9. "Amazing Kiss" (Tiny Voice, Production Remix)
10. "Listen to My Heart" (Hex Hector Main Japanese Club Mix)
