= Love & Honesty =

Studio album by BoA
- Released: January 15, 2004
- Recorded: 2003–2004
- Genre: Pop; R&B; pop rock
- Length: 56:03
- Language: Japanese
- Label: Avex Trax
- Producer: Ken Harada; Ken Matsubara; Akira; Kazuhiro Hara; Yoko Kuzuya; Hirata Shiyouitirou

BoA chronology
Shine We Are! (2003)	Love & Honesty (2004)	K-pop Selection (2004)

Singles from Love & Honesty
- 1. "Shine We Are! / Earthsong" Released: May 14, 2003; 2. "Double" Released: October 22, 2003; 3. "Rock with You" Released: December 3, 2003; 4. "Be the One" Released: February 11, 2004

Love & Honesty is the third Japanese studio album (sixth overall) by South Korean singer BoA, released via Avex Trax on January 15, 2004. The album also came in a "Perfect Edition" which had two discs—the standard CD and a DVD. Love & Honesty experienced commercial success in Japan, where it was number one on the Oricon charts for two weeks. In its first week the album sold 296,781 copies while during its second week it sold 145,325 copies. Love & Honesty was certified Triple Platinum by the RIAJ within a month of its release and was the 13th best-selling album in Japan during 2004.

== Track listing ==
Love & Honesty track listing
No.	Title	Lyrics	Music	Arrangement	Length
1.	"Rock with You"	Shoko Fujibayashi	Kazuhiro Hara	Akira	4:13
2.	"Shine We Are!"	Natsumi Watanabe	Kazuhiro Hara	Kazuhiro Hara	5:07
3.	"Some Day One Day" (ft. Verbal of M-Flo)	Akira Takato	Ken Harada	K-muto; Maeda Kazuhiko	4:34
4.	"Love & Honesty"	BoA; Natsumi Watanabe	Face2Fake	Face2Fake	4:43
5.	"Midnight Parade"	Shoko Fujibayashi	Bounceback	Akira	4:22
6.	"Be the One"	Stephen A. Kipner; David Frank; Nate Butler; Chinka Yasushi	Stephen A. Kipner; David Frank; Nate Butler; Kazuhiro Hara	Hirata Shiyouitirou	3:32
7.	"Expect"	Narumi Yamamoto	Ken Harada	Hirata Shiyouitirou	4:20
8.	"Over ~Across the Time~"	Ryoushi Sonoda	Ken Matsubara	Ken Matsubara	5:50
9.	"Kokoro no Tegami" (心の手紙; Letter From My Heart)	Ryoushi Sonoda	Tami Komori	Tami Komori	4:50
10.	"Double"	Natsumi Watanabe	Kazuhiro Hara	H•wonder	3:28
11.	"Easy to Be Hard"	Aida Takeshi	Akira	Akira	4:55
12.	"Song With No Name ~Namae no Nai Uta~" (～名前のない歌～)	Aida Takeshi	Yoko Kuzuya	Ken Matsubara	2:49
13.	"Milky Way ~Kimi no Uta~" (～君の歌～; Your Song)	Kenzie; Shoko Fujibayashi	Kazuhiro Hara	Kazuhiro Hara	3:20
Total length:					56:03

Sampling credits

- "Rock With You" contains a sample of Janet Jackson's "You Ain't Right"

DVD
No.	Title	Length
1.	"Shine We Are! (Video clip)"
2.	"Rock With You (Video clip)"
3.	"No. 1 (Video clip)"
4.	"Rock With You (Making of)"
5.	"Commercials"
6.	"Interview"

== Charts ==
=== Weekly charts ===
Chart (2004)	Peak position
Japanese Albums (Oricon)	1

=== Year-end charts ===
Chart (2004)	Position
Japanese Albums (Oricon)	13

== Sales and certifications ==
Region	Certification	Certified units/sales
Japan (RIAJ)	3× Platinum	653,630
South Korea	—	19,830

== Singles ==
Date	Title	Peak position	Sales
May 14, 2003	"Shine We Are!" / "Earthsong"	2	144,264
October 22, 2003	"Double" / "Midnight Parade" / "Milky Way: Kimi no Uta"	2	82,395
December 3, 2003	"Rock with You"	5	58,314
February 11, 2004	"Be the One"	15	24,292
