= Be the One (BoA song) =

Single by BoA

from the album Love & Honesty
- Released: February 11, 2004
- Genre: J-pop; electropop; pop rock
- Label: Avex Trax
- Songwriter(s): Stephen A. Kipner; David Frank; Nate Butler; Chinka Yasushi

BoA singles chronology
"Rock with You" (2004)	"Be the One" (2004)	"Quincy / Kono Yo no Shirushi" (2004)

"Be the One" is BoA's 12th Japanese solo single. Due to the popularity of the song from her third Japanese album, Love & Honesty, it was released as a special single. Containing only one song, one remix and one instrumental track. The single reached #15 on Oricon Singles Charts. It is featured as a bonus track for the Samurai Warriors 1 Soundtrack.

== Track listing ==
1. "Be the One"
2. "Be the One" (K-Muto Groovediggerz Remix)
3. "Be the One" (Instrumental)

== Charts ==
Oricon Sales Chart (Japan)

Chart	Peak position	Sales total
Oricon Weekly Singles Chart	15	24,292
