= Rock with You (BoA song) =

Single by BoA

from the album Love & Honesty
- Released: December 3, 2003
- Recorded: 2003
- Genre: J-pop; K-pop; dance-pop
- Label: Avex Trax; SM Entertainment

BoA singles chronology
"Double" (2003)	"Rock with You" (2003)	"Be the One" (2004)

"Rock with You" is BoA's 11th Japanese single and her 2nd Korean single. The single hit No. 5 on Oricon charts and has sold more than 60,000 copies. The Japanese single features pop group SMAP.

It uses a brief sample of Janet Jackson's "You Ain't Right," sampling Jackson saying "Good evening, ladies and gentleman" throughout its production.

== Track listing ==
=== Japanese version ===
1. "Rock with You"
2. "Double (English Version)"
3. "Rock with You (Instrumental)"
4. "Double (Instrumental)"

=== Korean version ===
1. "Rock with You"
2. "Atlantis Princess (아틀란티스 소녀) (Just Fiction Mix 2003)"
3. "Moon & Sunrise"
4. "Rock with You (Instrumental)"
5. "Atlantis Princess (아틀란티스 소녀) (Just Fiction Mix 2003) (Instrumental)"
6. "Moon & Sunrise (Instrumental)"
