= No. 1 (BoA song) =

"奇蹟/No. 1"
- Japanese single cover

Single by BoA

from the album No. 1 and Valenti
- A-side: "Kiseki"
- Released: April 12, 2002; September 19, 2002 (Japan)
- Recorded: 2002
- Genre: K-pop; dance-pop
- Length: 3:13
- Label: SM; Avex Trax
- Songwriter: Kim Young-ah
- Producers: Sigurd Heimdal Røsnes; Ahn Ik-soo

BoA singles chronology
"Every Heart (Minna no Kimochi)" (2002)	"奇蹟/No. 1" (2002)	"Valenti" (2002)

Music video
- "No. 1" on YouTube

"No. 1" is a song by South Korean recording artist BoA. It was released on April 12, 2002, for her second studio album of the same name (2002) through SM Entertainment. In Japan, the song was released as a double A-side CD single with the track "Kiseki" on September 19, 2002, via Avex Trax. The single, titled "Kiseki / No. 1", was included in her second Japanese studio album Valenti (2003). "No. 1" was written by Kim Young-ah, while production was handled by Sigurd Røsnes and Ahn Ik-soo.

Musically, "No. 1" is a dance song that infuses elements of europop. It was met with commercial success following its release; the CD single peaked at number three on the Japanese Oricon Singles Chart and was certified gold by the Recording Industry Association of Japan (RIAJ). In South Korea, "No. 1" won several awards, including the Most Popular Music Video daesang at the 2002 Mnet Music Video Festival and the Grand Prize at the annual SBS Gayo Daejeon. In 2021, a panel of 35 music experts and critics organized by Seoul Shinmun and Melon deemed it the greatest K-pop song of all time.

== Background and release ==
Initially, "No. 1" was not planned to serve as the lead single for BoA's album according to former SM Entertainment employee Jason Park. It was originally composed by Norwegian producer Sigurd Røsnes ("Ziggy") and was one of the tracks found on the agency's many demo CDs obtained during a business trip to Sweden in 2001. The track eventually gained favorability from SM staff and executive producer Lee Soo-man, and was then slated to be released by the label's in-house composer Yoo Young-jin. However, Park convinced Lee that "No. 1" would be a better choice for BoA after playing it during a car ride for him.

In Japan, it was selected as the second lead maxi CD single for BoA's second Japanese studio album Valenti, and was released as "Kiseki / No. 1" on September 19, 2002, by Avex Trax. The single contains the A-side track "Kiseki" and the B-side track "Flower", in addition to instrumental versions of the tracks. "Kiseki" was also used as Kose's "Luminous" CM song while "No. 1" was used as a theme song for the Busan 2002 Asian Games.

=== Songwriting controversy ===
After the initial demo was selected for BoA's album in 2002, songwriter Kim Young-ah was offered ₩2 million (US$1,800) by SM Entertainment to write its Korean lyrics. Upon the song's release, SM signed a music copyright license agreement with Universal Music, who in 2003, registered Røsnes as its sole lyricist and composer to the Korean Music Copyright Association (KMCA). In 2011, Kim requested to the KMCA to withhold payments of its copyright royalties for Universal Music, and subsequently filed a lawsuit regarding the song's copyright status the following year. In July 2015, Kim was judged the rightful credit as the songwriter by the South Korean supreme court, and was awarded ₩45 million (US$40,000) in royalties as well as ₩5 million (US$4,400) in compensation for the 13 year-old ordeal.

== Composition ==
Musically, "No. 1" is a dance song that incorporates stylistic elements from europop. The version released by BoA was written by Kim Young-ah, while arrangement of the track was handled by Ahn Ik-soo. It features "glittering dance production reminiscent of Max Martin and innocent R&B vocals". While producing the song, Røsnes expressed that he "wanted to write kind of an uplifting happy thing – something that would make you feel good".

== Reception ==
"No. 1" was met with positive reception in both South Korea and Japan. In Mnet's Gayo Best 27 ranking of the top 100 popular songs during the first half of 2002, "No. 1" ranked at number three, placing behind Shinhwa's "Perfect Man" and Lee Seung-hwan's "Wrong". In December, it was reported that "No. 1" was the song most frequently looked up by South Korean internet users throughout the year, as well as the top choice for those seeking a song to confess their love. In addition, it was ranked number five in the list of the year's most downloaded mobile phone ringtones.

In Japan, the single "Kiseki / No. 1" peaked at number three on the weekly Oricon Singles Chart. The release became her second top-three single in the country, and remained on the chart for a total of 17 weeks. In October 2002, "Kiseki / No. 1" was certified gold by the Recording Industry Association of Japan (RIAJ) for physical shipments of 200,000 units.

== Accolades ==
Awards and nominations for "No. 1"
Year	Organization	Award	Result	Ref.
2002	Mnet Music Video Festival	Most Popular Music Video (Daesang)	Won	
2002	Mnet Music Video Festival	Best Dance Performance	Won	
2002	Mnet Music Video Festival	Best Female Artist	Nominated	
2002	SBS Gayo Daejeon	Grand Prize (Daesang)	Won	
2023	Korea World Music Culture Hall of Fame	Hall of Fame	Inducted	

Music program awards
Program	Date	Ref.
Music Camp	May 11, 2002	
Inkigayo	May 12, 2002	
Inkigayo	May 19, 2002	
Inkigayo	May 26, 2002	

== Impact and legacy ==
BoA's debut Japanese album Listen to My Heart from earlier that year was met with breakthrough success for the South Korean music industry, where it became the first album by a non-Japanese artist to top the Oricon Albums Chart and to be certified million. Regarding the release of "No. 1", Michael Fuhr wrote that it acted as "not only a milestone in [BoA's] career as a transnational idol star, but also proved the viability of SM Entertainment's export strategy. It was the first time the company gained chart success in Korea and Japan with a song licensed from Europe." Tamar Herman wrote that "As a result, the Japanese music market became more familiar with Korean artistry and a major market for just about every other K-pop act that followed."

In an article that was published after the release of BoA's tenth Korean studio album in 2020, Korea JoongAng Daily highlighted "No. 1" as the track that initially propelled the singer into the spotlight in South Korea, noting that it remained her most acclaimed hit. In an interview with the same publication, BoA singled out "No. 1" and 2012's "Only One" as her two favorite hits of her career. South China Morning Post's Lucy Jeong highlighted the phrase "You're still my number one" as a popular catchphrase and a common fan cheer chant, and remarked that the "iconic song, which showcases Boa's powerful dancing and vocals as well as a cheerful upbeat style, is a go-to for other K-pop girl groups, like GFriend and Red Velvet, to perform as a dance cover."

In 2014, Mnet included "No. 1" in their Legend 100 listing of most influential songs in Korean popular music history since the 1960s. In The Dong-a Ilbo's 2016 survey involving 2,000 people and 30 Korean music critics, it was voted as the fourth best female idol song in the past 20 years by both the public and music experts, the latter along with 2NE1's "I Am the Best" and Girls' Generation's "Into the New World". In a panel of 35 music experts and industry professionals organized by online portal Melon and newspaper Seoul Shinmun, "No. 1" was ranked the greatest K-pop song of all-time for its cultural significance, artistic quality and performance. Rolling Stone ranked it the 18th greatest song in the history of Korean pop music, referring to it as "her most emblematic crossover hit".

"No. 1" on critic lists and polls
Publisher	Year	List	Rank	Ref.
MTV Korea	2004	100 Best Korean Music Videos	9	
Gallup Korea	2006	100 All Time Favorite Korean Songs	27	
Gallup Korea	2024	10 Most Beloved K-pop Songs of the 21st Century	10	
Mnet	2014	Legend 100 Songs	—	
Music Y	2014	Best 120 Dance Tracks of All Time	37	
The Dong-a Ilbo	2016	Best Female Idol Songs in the Past 20 Years	4	
Melon	2021	Top 100 K-pop Songs of All Time	1	
Marie Claire	2021	35 Essential K-pop Songs	—	
Rolling Stone	2023	100 Greatest Songs in the History of Korean Pop Music	18	

== Track listing ==
Japanese CD single

1. "Kiseki" – 4:17
2. "No. 1" – 3:13
3. "Flower" – 3:30
4. "Kiseki" (Instrumental) – 4:17
5. "No. 1" (Instrumental) – 3:13
6. "Flower" (Instrumental) – 3:30

== Credits and personnel ==
Credits adapted from MusicBrainz and Melon.

Korean version credits

- BoA – lead vocals
- Kim Young-ah – lyricist
- Sigurd Heimdal Røsnes – composer
- Ahn Ik-soo – arranger

Japanese version credits

- BoA – lead vocals
- Natsumi Watanabe – lyricist (track 1)
- Kosuke Morimoto – composer (track 1)
- Ken Matsubara – arranger (track 1)
- Ryoju Sonoda – lyricist (tracks 2 and 3)
- Sigurd Heimdal Røsnes – composer (track 2)
- Ahn Ik-soo – arranger (track 2)
- Bounceback – composer (track 3)
- Akira – arranger (track 3)

== Charts ==
Charts for "Kiseki / No. 1"
Chart (2002)	Peak position
Japan Singles (Oricon)	3

== Sales and certifications ==
Region	Certification	Certified units/sales
Japan (RIAJ)	Gold	200,000^{^}
^{^} Shipments figures based on certification alone.

== Release history ==
Region	Date	Label(s)	Ref.
South Korea	April 12, 2002	SM Entertainment	
Japan	September 19, 2002	Avex Trax	
