= ID; Peace B (song) =

2000 single by BoA

- Japanese single cover

Single by BoA

from the album ID; Peace B and Listen to My Heart
- Released: August 25, 2000; May 30, 2001 (Japan)
- Studio: SM Booming System, Seoul, South Korea
- Genre: K-pop; J-pop
- Length: 3:53
- Label: SM; Avex Trax
- Composer: Yoo Young-jin
- Lyricists: Yoo Young-jin; Mai Matsumuro (JP)

BoA singles chronology
"ID; Peace B" (2000)	"Amazing Kiss" (2001)

Music video
- "ID; Peace B" (KR ver.) on YouTube

"ID; Peace B" is the debut single by South Korean singer BoA from her debut studio album of the same title, released through SM Entertainment on August 25, 2000. In Japan, it was released through Avex Trax on May 30, 2001, and served as the lead single for her debut Japanese studio album Listen to My Heart (2002).

== Meaning ==
In an interview BoA explained "ID; Peace B" stands for her ID name, which is BoA.

== Music video ==
=== Korean version ===
The video starts off with BoA vocalizing, rehearsing the ID; Peace B dance and filming ID; Peace B. The video shows BoA dancing in various places. First with her backup dancers in a purple background, then by herself in a warehouse and in a Relativity-esque background.

=== Japanese version ===
The music video starts with BoA dancing in the dark with her backup dancers. The camera zooms out and reveals that BoA is watching herself on the TV. Throughout the video, BoA changes the channel and sees various commercials that features herself. At the start of the chorus BoA starts to sing the chorus. At the end, BoA starts to dance to the music and then it fades to black. A clip of her Korean music video for "Sara" is shown when BoA is flipping through the channels.

== In popular culture ==
NCT members Mark, Jeno, Haechan, Jaemin, and Jisung, performed a dance to the song in Mnet Show EXO 90:2014 in 2014 and Disney Channel Korea show Mickey Mouse Club in 2015, (then-know under the name SM Rookies).

== Track listing ==
Japanese CD single

1. "ID; Peace B" – 3:53
2. "Dreams Come True" (Ken Harada/Lyrics By Maki Mihara) – 4:54
3. "ID; Peace B" (Instrumental) – 3:53
4. "Dreams Come True" (Instrumental) – 4:54
5. "ID; Peace B" (English Version) – 3:53

== Credits and personnel ==
Credits adapted from album's liner notes.

Studio

- SM Booming System – recording, mixing
- Sonic Korea – mastering

Personnel

- SM Entertainment – executive producer
- Lee Soo-man – producer
- BoA – vocals
- Yoo Young-jin – producer, Korean lyrics, composition, arrangement, vocal directing, background vocals, strings conducting, recording, mixing
- Mai Matsumuro – Japanese lyrics
- Kim Hyun-ah – background vocals
- Lee Joon-hee – background vocals
- Jung Mi-young – background vocals
- Shim Sang-won – strings
- Yoo Chang-yong – recording assistant
- Yoo Han-jin – recording assistant
- Jeon Hoon – mastering

== Charts ==
Charts and sales for "ID; Peace B"
Chart	Peak position	Sales total
Oricon Weekly Singles Chart	20	40,470
