= Valenti (song) =

Single by BoA

from the album Valenti and Miracle
- B-side: "Realize (Stay With Me)"
- Released: August 28, 2002
- Genre: Dance-pop
- Length: 4:18
- Label: Avex Trax
- Songwriters: Chinfa Kan; Kazuhiro Hara; BoA; Natsumi Watanabe; Emi K.; Lynn

BoA singles chronology
"Don't Start Now" (2002)	"Valenti" (2002)	"Kiseki / No.1" (2002)

Music video
- "Valenti" (JP ver.) on YouTube

"Valenti" is a song by South Korean singer BoA. It was released for her second Japanese studio album of the same name (2003) on August 28, 2002, serving as her sixth Japanese single under Avex Trax. It features "Realize (Stay With Me)" as a B-side. A Korean version of "Valenti" was released as part of her compilation album Miracle, which was made available by SM Entertainment on September 24, 2002.

The single experienced commercial success in Japan; it peaked at number two on the weekly Oricon Singles Chart and became her first top-three entry. It has sold over 202,000 physical copies in the country, making it her best-selling single to-date. It was certified gold by the Recording Industry Association of Japan (RIAJ) for both physical shipments and digital downloads.

== Background and release ==
"Valenti" was released on August 28, 2002 as BoA's sixth Japanese single via Avex Trax. A dance-pop number, South China Morning Post's Lucy Jeong wrote that the song is "rooted in Latin music with a funky and mesmerizing sound". The release includes the B-side "Realize (Stay With Me)", as well as an English and instrumental version. A Korean version of the song was recorded as a single and was included on her compilation album Miracle, which was released through SM Entertainment on September 24, 2002. The Japanese version of "Valenti" served as the title track for her second Japanese studio album of the same name, released on January 29, 2003.

== Commercial performance ==
"Valenti" was a commercial success in Japan. The single peaked at number two on both the daily and weekly Oricon Singles Chart, making it her highest charting-single at the time, and would go on to become her highest-selling single in the country with over 202,000 physical copies sold. The physical single was certified gold by the Recording Industry Association of Japan (RIAJ) in September 2002 for shipments of over 200,000 units. On the year-end Oricon Singles Chart, "Valenti" was ranked the 65th best-selling single in the country during 2002. In December 2016, the digital version was certified gold for having surpassed 100,000 units in digital downloads.

== Promotion ==
Following the release of Miracle, BoA performed the song on several South Korean music programs. At her first Kōhaku Uta Gassen appearance on New Year's Eve of that year, BoA made a performance with the song. On March 27, 2003, BoA embarked on her 1st Live Tour: 2003 – Valenti, which spanned six shows in Osaka, Nagoya, and Tokyo. On May 17, BoA performed the song along with "No. 1" at the Dream Concert in Seoul.

== Accolades ==
On November 10, 2002, BoA received a music program award on SBS's Inkigayo for "Valenti". Its music video received a nomination for Best Pop Video at the 2003 MTV Video Music Awards Japan.

== Track listing ==
Japanese CD single

1. "Valenti" – 4:19
2. "Realize (Stay With Me)" – 4:17
3. "Valenti" (English version) – 4:18
4. "Valenti" (Instrumental) – 4:19

== Charts ==
=== Weekly charts ===
Chart (2002)	Peak position
Japan Singles (Oricon)	2

=== Year-end charts ===
Chart (2002)	Position
Japan Singles (Oricon)	65

== Sales and certifications ==
Region	Certification	Certified units/sales
Japan (RIAJ) Physical single	Gold	200,000^{^}
Japan (RIAJ) Digital single	Gold	100,000^{*}
Streaming
Japan (RIAJ)	Gold	50,000,000^{†}
^{*} Sales figures based on certification alone.^{^} Shipments figures based on certification alone.^{†} Streaming-only figures based on certification alone.
