= ID; Peace B =

Studio album by BoA
- Released: August 25, 2000
- Recorded: 2000
- Studios: SM Studios, Seoul
- Genres: K-pop; R&B; teen pop
- Length: 45:19
- Label: SM

BoA chronology
ID; Peace B (2000)	Jumping into the World (2001)

Singles from ID; Peace B
- 1. "ID; Peace B" Released: August 25, 2000

ID; Peace B is the debut studio album by South Korean singer BoA, released on August 25, 2000 by SM Entertainment. It saw moderate levels of success in South Korea upon its release, peaking at number 16 on the Recording Industry Association of Korea's monthly album chart in October 2000. The album sold 156,354 copies in 2000 and was the 59th best-selling album of the year. The album was released on May 29, 2002 in Japan, where it reached number 30 on the Oricon Albums Chart.

== Production and lyrics ==
"ID; Peace B" is about the generation gap due to the use of the internet. The song "Sara" is about a cat, "I'm Sorry" is about the tragedy of loving the lover of her older sister, and

== Track listing ==
CD
No.	Title	Lyrics	Music	Arranger(s)	Length
1.	"ID; Peace B"	Yoo Youngjin	Yoo Youngjin	Yoo Youngjin	3:58
2.	"Come to Me"	Kim Hyungsuk	Kim Hyungsuk	Kim Hyungsuk	3:35
3.	"Chenyeom (Heart-Off)" (체념 / Resignation)	Kim Jong Sook	Bang Sihyuk (Hit Man Bang)	Bang Sihyuk (Hit Man Bang)	3:53
4.	"Sara" (사라)	Park Jeongian	Kang Wonsok	Kang Wonsok	3:53
5.	"Bimil Ilgi (I'm Sorry)" (비밀일기 / Secret Diary)	Shin Younah	Lee Hyunjeong	Kwak Youngjun	4:52
6.	"Andwae, nan andwae (No Way)" (안돼, 난 안돼 / No, I Can't)	Yoo Yoojin	Bang Sihyuk (Hit Man Bang)	Bang Sihyuk (Hit Man Bang)	3:36
7.	"Chama (Every Breath You Take)" (차마)	Kim Naehee	Hong Suk • Noh Youngjoo	Hong Suk	5:01
8.	"Whatever"	Seo Yoongkeun	Seo Yoongkeun	Seo Yoongkeun	3:36
9.	"I'm Your Lady Tonight"	Yang Jaesun	Kim Hyungsuk	Kim Hyungsuk	3:09
10.	"Eorin Yeonin" (어린 연인 / Young Lovers)	Kim Jangsook	Kim Hyungsuk	Kim Hyungsuk	4:25
11.	"Ibyeol Junbi" (이별준비 / Letting You Go)	Park Jinyoung	Kim Hyungsuk	Kim Hyungsuk	4:02
12.	"Meon Hutnal-uri (Someday Somewhere)" (먼 훗날 우리 / In the Distant Future)	Kim Yeojin (Jennifer)	Lee Hyunjung	Kwak Youngjun	3:59
Total length:					45:19

== Charts ==
=== Weekly charts ===
Chart (2002)	Peak position
Japanese Albums (Oricon)	30

=== Monthly charts ===
Chart (October 2000)	Peak position
South Korean Albums (RIAK)	16

=== Year-end charts ===
Chart (2000)	Position
South Korean Albums (RIAK)	59

== Release history ==
Region	Date	Label	Ref.
South Korea	August 25, 2000	SM Entertainment	
Japan	May 29, 2002	Avex Trax	
