= Shine We Are! =

Compilation album by BoA
- Released: December 3, 2003
- Recorded: 2003
- Genre: K-pop
- Label: S.M. Entertainment
- Producer: Lee Soo Man

BoA chronology
Next World (2003)	Shine We Are! (2003)	Love & Honesty (2004)

Shine We Are! is the third special album by Korean singer BoA, released on December 3, 2003. Some of her tracks contain Korean versions of her Japanese songs; the last track in the album features the Irish boy band Westlife.

== Track listing ==
1. "B.I.O"
2. "Shine We Are!"
3. "세상의 어디에서도 (One Way)"
4. "Discovery"
5. "Milky Way" (Club Remix)
6. "Flower"
7. "Searching for Truth"
8. "Beside You"
9. "이별풍경 (Always)"
10. "Flying Without Wings" (Westlife featuring BoA)
