= Jewel Song / Beside You (Boku o Yobu Koe) =

"Jewel Song / Beside You: Boku o Yobu Koe"

Single by BoA

from the album Valenti
- Released: December 11, 2002
- Recorded: 2002
- Genre: J-pop
- Length: 5:27
- Label: Avex Trax
- Songwriter(s): Jewel Song: Natsumi Watanabe, Kazuhiro Hara; Beside You (Boku o Yobu Koe): Natsumi Watanabe, Bounceback

BoA singles chronology
"Kiseki / No. 1" (2002)	"Jewel Song / Beside You: Boku o Yobu Koe" (2002)	"Shine We Are! / Earthsong" (2003)

"Jewel Song / Beside You: Boku o Yobu Koe" is BoA's eighth Japanese single. It was on the 2003 top singles sales according to the Oricon with sales of 151,000. It is also her fourth highest selling single. Beside You -Boku wo Yobu Koe- was used as opening theme song for the anime Monkey Typhoon.

== Track listing ==
1. Jewel Song
2. Beside You: Boku wo Yobu Koe
3. Jewel Song (Instrumental)
4. Beside You: Boku wo Yobu Koe (Instrumental)

== Charts ==
Oricon Chart (Japan)

Chart	Peak position	Sales total
Oricon Weekly Singles Chart	3	151,485
