= Amazing Kiss =

Single by BoA

from the album Listen to My Heart
- Language: Japanese
- B-side: "Someday, Somewhere"
- Released: July 25, 2001
- Genre: J-pop; electropop; dance-pop
- Length: 21:59
- Label: Avex Trax
- Songwriter: Bounceback

BoA singles chronology
"ID; Peace B" (2001)	"Amazing Kiss" (2001)	"Kimochi wa Tsutawaru" (2001)

"Amazing Kiss" is a song by South Korean recording artist BoA for her first Japanese studio album, Listen to My Heart (2002). It was released as the singer's second Japanese single through Avex Trax on July 25, 2001. It peaked at number 23 on the Oricon Singles Chart and sold over 59,000 copies.

== Background and release ==
"Amazing Kiss" was used as a ending theme for several programs, including for LF's "Show Up Nighter" in July 2001 and CTV-NTV's "Romihii" in August 2001. It was also used as an advertising jingle for Kanebo Cosmetics' T'estimo eyeshadow product in Japan. The song's choreography was created by Masaharu "Sam" Maruyama (the ex-husband of Namie Amuro).

== Commercial performance ==
"Amazing Kiss" peaked at 23 on the Oricon Singles Chart and charted for eight weeks, selling 59,450 copies. A limited edition vinyl of the single was also made available, which was limited to 1,500 copies.

== Track listing ==
1. "Amazing Kiss" – 4:36
2. "Someday, Somewhere" – 4:07
3. "Amazing Kiss" (English version) – 4:36
4. "Amazing Kiss" (Instrumental) – 4:36
5. "Someday, Somewhere" (Instrumental) – 4:04

== Charts ==
=== Weekly charts ===
Chart (2001)	Peak position
Japan Singles (Oricon)	22

== Sales ==
Region	Certification	Certified units/sales
Japan	—	59,450
