= Double (BoA song) =

Single by BoA

from the album Love & Honesty
- Released: October 22, 2003
- Recorded: 2003
- Genre: J-pop; K-pop; dance-pop
- Label: Avex Trax; SM Entertainment
- Songwriters: K Hara, N Watanabe

BoA singles chronology
| "Shine We Are! / Earthsong" (2003) | "Double" (2003) | "Rock with You" (2003) |

"Double" is BoA's 10th Japanese single and 1st Korean single. She won at the MTV Video Music Awards Japan for best dance video with the music video of this song. It was a number two hit in Japan.

== Track listing ==
=== Japanese version ===
1. Double
2. Midnight Parade
3. Milky Way: Kimi no Uta
4. Double (Instrumental)
5. Midnight Parade (Instrumental)
6. Milky Way: Kimi no Uta (Instrumental)

=== Korean version ===
1. Double
2. Always (이별풍경)
3. Milky Way (Club Remix)
4. Double (Instrumental)
5. Always (이별풍경) (Instrumental)

== Release history ==
Release dates and formats for "Double"
| Region | Date | Format | Label |
|---|---|---|---|
| Japan | October 22, 2003 | Digital download; streaming | Avex Trax; SM Entertainment |
| South Korea | October 22, 2003 | Digital download; streaming | Avex Trax; SM Entertainment |
| Various | October 23, 2003 | Digital download; streaming | Avex Trax; SM Entertainment |

== Charts ==
Oricon Chart (Japan)

| Chart | Peak position | Sales total |
|---|---|---|
| Oricon Weekly Singles Chart | 2 | 82,395 |
