= Every Heart (Minna no Kimochi) =

Single by BoA

from the album Listen to My Heart
- Released: March 13, 2002
- Recorded: 2002
- Genre: J-pop; R&B
- Length: 4:32
- Label: Avex Trax
- Lyricist: Natsumi Watanabe
- Producers: Bounceback; H-Wonder

BoA singles chronology
"Listen to My Heart" (2002)	"Every Heart (Minna no Kimochi)" (2002)	"Don't Start Now" (2002)

Music video
- "Every Heart (Minna no Kimochi)" on YouTube

"Every Heart (Minna no Kimochi)" (Every Heart -ミンナノキモチ-; lit. Every Heart – Everyone's Feelings) is a song recorded by South Korean singer BoA. It was released as her fifth single under Avex Trax on March 13, 2002, the same day as her Japanese debut album Listen to My Heart. It was featured in the hit anime, Inuyasha, as the fourth (in Japan) and the second (Korean) ending theme song.

The song was a modest commercial success in Japan, reaching number ten on the Oricon Singles Chart and selling over 84,000 copies. A Korean version of the song was included on the track list of her Korean compilation album Miracle in September 2002.

== Background and release ==
"Every Heart (Minna no Kimochi)" was released simultaneously with her debut Japanese studio album Listen to My Heart on March 13, 2002. The album experienced large amounts of commercial success in Japan, becoming the first album by a Korean artist to be certified million by the Recording Industry Association of Japan (RIAJ). The single was also the first Copy Control release in Japan.

A Korean version of the song was included on her compilation album Miracle, which was released in September 2002. In May 2022, a version of the song featuring re-recorded vocals was included on her album The Greatest.

== Live performances ==
"Every Heart (Minna no Kimochi)" was featured on the set lists of several of her concert tours in Japan, including the 1st Live Tour: 2003 Valenti, Live Tour 2004: Love & Honesty, and the Arena Tour 2005: Best of Soul. It was also performed during her 20th Anniversary Special Live "The Greatest" in May 2022.

== Track listing ==
CD single

1. "Every Heart – Minna no Kimochi" (Every Heart -ミンナノキモチ-) – 4:32
2. "Every Heart" (English version) – 4:32
3. "Listen to My Heart" (Ken Harada's TB-Bassin' Remix) – 4:59
4. "Every Heart – Minna no Kimochi" (Instrumental) – 4:32

== Charts ==
Chart (2002)	Peak position
Japan Singles (Oricon)	10

== Sales and certifications ==
Region	Certification	Certified units/sales
Japan Physical single	—	84,430
