= List of BoA concert tours =

BoA concert tours
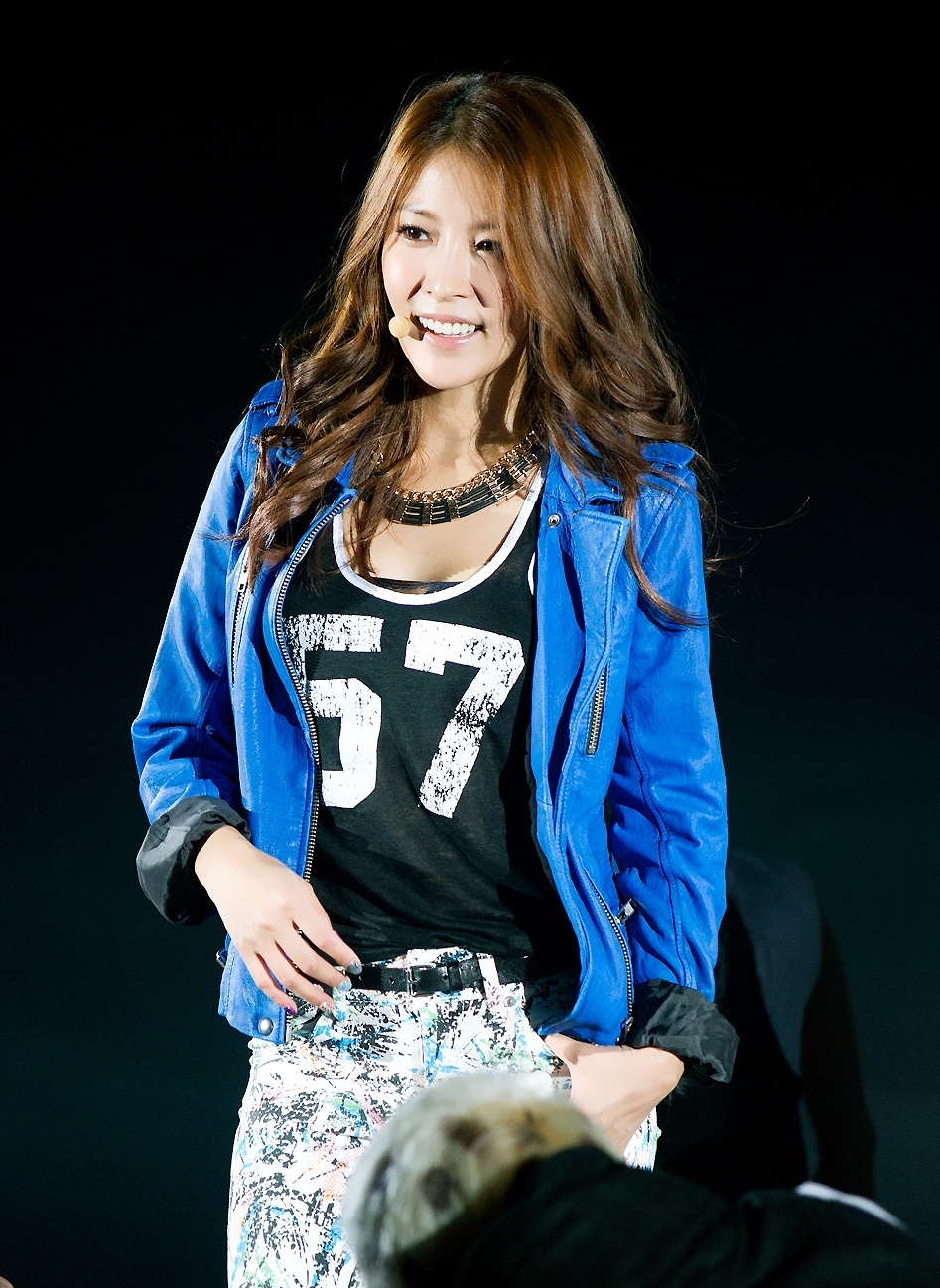
- BoA in October 2012
- ↙Concert tours: 12
- ↙Other concerts: 9

This is a list of concert tours by South Korean singer-songwriter and dancer BoA, which is an acronym for Beat of Angel. She is primarily active in South Korea and Japan, and has embarked on numerous concert tours in several countries in Asia. In addition to her tours, she has held various other live shows including Christmas concerts. She is often referred to as the Queen of K-pop.

== 1st Live Tour: 2003 Valenti ==
1st Live Tour: 2003 VALENTI Set List

Set List

1. Introduction
2. Live Opening
3. Listen To My Heart
4. Beside You -Boku Wo You Koe-
5. Kimochi Wa Tsutawaru -My Feelings Will Reach You-
6. Kiseki -Miracle-
7. Flower
8. B.I.O
9. Searching For Truth
10. Prelude (Jewel Song)
11. Jewel Song
12. Sekai No Katsumi De -In The Corner Of The World-
13. Band Introduction
14. Power
15. Nobody But You
16. Dancer Introduction
17. Amazing Kiss
18. No.1
19. Valenti
20. ID: Peace B
21. Shine We Are!
22. Holiday (Feat Palm Drive) (5 April Only)
23. Winding Road (Feat DABO) (5 April Only)
24. Every Heart -Minna No Kimochi-

Concert dates
Date	City	Country	Venue	Attendance
27 March 2003	Osaka	Japan	Festival Hall	—
28 March 2003	Osaka	Japan	Festival Hall	—
30 March 2003	Nagoya	Japan	Century Hall	—
31 March 2003	Nagoya	Japan	Century Hall	—
5 April 2003	Tokyo	Japan	Yoyogi National Gymnasium	30,000
6 April 2003	Tokyo	Japan	Yoyogi National Gymnasium	30,000
Total				44,000

== Live Tour 2004: Love & Honesty ==
Live Tour 2004: Love & Honesty Set List
1. Opening
2. Double
3. Miracle
4. Expect
5. Easy To Be Hard
6. Love & Honesty
7. Some Day One Day (Feat Verbal)
8. Song With No Name
9. Midnight Parade
10. Rock With You
11. Be The One
12. Band Introduction
13. Over (Across The Time)
14. Dancer Introduction
15. Shine We Are!
16. Valenti
17. No.1
18. Jewel Song
19. Everything Needs Love
20. The Love Bug (Feat M-Flo) (17 April Only)
21. Listen To My Heart
22. Every Heart
23. Feel The Same

Concert dates
Date	City	Country	Venue	Attendance	Revenue
20 March 2004	Saitama	Japan	Saitama Super Arena	105,000	$8,000,000
21 March 2004	Saitama	Japan	Saitama Super Arena	105,000	$8,000,000
26 March 2004	Nagoya	Japan	Nippon Gaishi Hall	105,000	$8,000,000
27 March 2004	Nagoya	Japan	Nippon Gaishi Hall	105,000	$8,000,000
3 April 2004	Fukuoka	Japan	Marine Messe	105,000	$8,000,000
10 April 2004	Osaka	Japan	Osaka-jō Hall	105,000	$8,000,000
11 April 2004	Osaka	Japan	Osaka-jō Hall	105,000	$8,000,000
17 April 2004	Yokohama	Japan	Yokohama Arena	105,000	$8,000,000
18 April 2004	Yokohama	Japan	Yokohama Arena	105,000	$8,000,000

== Arena Tour 2005: Best Of Soul ==
Arena Tour 2005: Best Of Soul Set List
1. Miracle
2. Listen To My Heart
3. Rock With You
4. Amazing Kiss
5. My Feelings Will Reach You
6. Double
7. Prelude (Kono Yo No Shirushi)
8. Kono Yo No Shirushi
9. B.I.O
10. Be The One
11. Prelude (Love & Honesty)
12. Love & Honesty
13. Jewel Song
14. Shine We Are!
15. Valenti
16. No.1
17. Quincy
18. Meri Kuri
19. Do The Motion
20. Medley (Rock With You/ID:Peace B/Valenti/With U)
21. Every Heart

Concert dates
Date	City	Country	Venue	Attendance
2 April 2005	Fukuoka	Japan	Marine Messe	70,000
7 April 2005	Tokyo	Japan	Yoyogi National Gymnasium	70,000
9 April 2005	Tokyo	Japan	Yoyogi National Gymnasium	70,000
10 April 2005	Tokyo	Japan	Yoyogi National Gymnasium	70,000
16 April 2005	Osaka	Japan	Osaka-jō Hall	70,000
17 April 2005	Osaka	Japan	Osaka-jō Hall	70,000
24 April 2005	Nagoya	Japan	Nippon Gaishi Hall	70,000
25 April 2005	Nagoya	Japan	Nippon Gaishi Hall	70,000

== BoA The Live 2006 ==
BoA The Live 2006 Set List
1. Listen To My Heart
2. Valenti
3. Do The Motion
4. Soundscape
5. Your Colour
6. Ain't No Sunshine
7. Make A Secret
8. Moon & Sunrise
9. Kimi No Tonari De
10. Brand New Beat
11. Key Of Heart
12. La La La Love Song
13. Quincy
14. Everlasting
15. Konoyo No Shirushi
16. Winter Love
17. Meri Kuri
18. The Love Bug (Feat M-Flo) (11 November Only)

Concert dates
Date	City	Country	Venue	Attendance
29 September 2006	Nagoya	Japan	Zepp Nagoya	25,000
30 September 2006	Nagoya	Japan	Zepp Nagoya	25,000
7 October 2006	Fukuoka	Japan	Zepp Fukuoka	25,000
8 October 2006	Fukuoka	Japan	Zepp Fukuoka	25,000
13 October 2006	Osaka	Japan	Zepp Osaka	25,000
14 October 2006	Osaka	Japan	Zepp Osaka	25,000
17 October 2006	Tokyo	Japan	Zepp Tokyo	25,000
18 October 2006	Tokyo	Japan	Zepp Tokyo	25,000
21 October 2006	Sendai	Japan	Zepp Sendai	25,000
22 October 2006	Sendai	Japan	Zepp Sendai	25,000
28 October 2006	Sapporo	Japan	Zepp Sapporo	25,000
29 October 2006	Sapporo	Japan	Zepp Sapporo	25,000
11 November 2006	Tokyo	Japan	Zepp Tokyo	25,000

== Arena Tour 2007: Made in Twenty (20) ==
Concert dates
Date	City	Country	Venue	Attendance
31 March 2007	Yokohama	Japan	Yokohama Arena	20,000
1 April 2007	Yokohama	Japan	Yokohama Arena	20,000
7 April 2007	Fukuoka	Japan	Marine Messe Fukuoka	—
14 April 2007	Osaka	Japan	Osaka-jō Hall	—
15 April 2007	Osaka	Japan	Osaka-jō Hall	—
21 April 2007	Nagoya	Japan	Nippon Gaishi Hall	—
22 April 2007	Nagoya	Japan	Nippon Gaishi Hall	—
Total				70,000

== BoA Live Tour 2008: The Face ==
BoA Live Tour 2008: The Face Set List
1. Lose Your Mind
2. Girl In The Mirror
3. Listen To My Heart
4. My Way, Your Way
5. Bad Drive
6. Style
7. Sweet Impact
8. Song With No Name
9. Winter Love
10. Love Letter
11. Brave
12. Gyappu Ni Yayareta!
13. Happy Birthday
14. Be You With
15. Old Skool Medley (Rock With You/Amazing Kiss/ID: Peace B/Shine We Are!/Quincy/Valenti)
16. Diamond Heart
17. Dakishimeru
18. Aggressive
19. Brand New Beat
20. Kissing You
21. Sparkling
22. Best Friend

Concert dates
Date	City	Country	Venue	Attendance
8 May 2008	Chiba	Japan	Inchihara Hall	50,000
10 May 2008	Yokohama	Japan	Kanagawa Kenmin Hall	50,000
15 May 2008	Nagoya	Japan	Century Hall	50,000
16 May 2008	Nagoya	Japan	Century Hall	50,000
17 May 2008	Yokohama	Japan	Kanagawa Kenmin Hall	50,000
21 May 2008	Niigata	Japan	Niigata Prefectural Civic Center	50,000
23 May 2008	Toyama	Japan	Aubade Hall	50,000
28 May 2008	Hiroshima	Japan	Public Welfare Annuity Hall	50,000
30 May 2008	Osaka	Japan	Grand Cube Main Hall	50,000
31 May 2008	Osaka	Japan	Grand Cube Main Hall	50,000
5 June 2008	Shizuoka	Japan	ACT City Hamamatsu Grand Hall	50,000
6 June 2008	Kobe	Japan	Kobe International House Kokusai Hall	50,000
13 June 2008	Sendai	Japan	Sun Plaza Hall	50,000
17 June 2008	Oita	Japan	Ichiko Grand Hall	50,000
18 June 2008	Fukuoka	Japan	Fukuoka Sun Palace	50,000
20 June 2008	Kagawa	Japan	Kagawa Prefectural Grand Hall	50,000
22 June 2008	Shiga	Japan	Biwako Hall	50,000
26 June 2008	Saitama	Japan	Oyina Sonic City	50,000
28 June 2008	Tokyo	Japan	Tokyo International Forum	50,000
29 June 2008	Tokyo	Japan	Tokyo International Forum	50,000

== BoA Live 2010: Identity ==
BoA Live 2010: Identity Set List
1. This Is Who I Am
2. Easy
3. Energetic
4. Make A Secret
5. IZM
6. Interlude 1
7. Is This Love?
8. Do The Motion
9. White Wishes
10. Interlude 2
11. Neko Rabu
12. Ballad Medley (Smile Again/Every Heart/Jewel Song)
13. The End
14. Possibility
15. Eien
16. Fallin'
17. Joyful Smile
18. Lose Your Mind
19. Bump Bump!
20. Eat You Up
21. Before Your Said Goodbye To Me
22. My All

Concert dates
Date	City	Country	Venue	Attendance
17 February 2010	Kobe	Japan	Kokusai Hall	35,000
18 February 2010	Kobe	Japan	Kokusai Hall	35,000
24 February 2010	Yokohama	Japan	Kanagawa Kenmin Hall	35,000
25 February 2010	Yokohama	Japan	Kanagawa Kenmin Hall	35,000
7 March 2010	Fukuoka	Japan	Sun Palace	35,000
9 March 2010	Osaka	Japan	Grand Cube Hall	35,000
10 March 2010	Osaka	Japan	Grand Cube Hall	35,000
20 March 2010	Hiroshima	Japan	ALSOK Hall	35,000
26 March 2010	Nagoya	Japan	Aichi Prefectural Arts Center	35,000
28 March 2010	Sendai	Japan	Sun Plaza Hall	35,000
9 April 2010	Saitama	Japan	Sonic City Hall	35,000
15 April 2010	Tokyo	Japan	Tokyo International Forum	35,000
16 April 2010	Tokyo	Japan	Tokyo International Forum	35,000

== BoA Special Live 2013: Here I Am ==
"Special Live 2013: Here I Am" is BoA's first solo concert in South Korea. It was held on 26 and 27 January at the Olympic Hall in Seoul's Olympic Park. Originally there was only one date for the concert but after the tickets for the first day sold out rapidly, SM Entertainment decided to add another date. On 11 April 2013, 3 more concerts were added to the tour: one in Taiwan and two in South Korea.

BoA Special Live 2013: Here I Am Set List
1. Hurricane Venus
2. Dangerous
3. Energetic
4. Eat You Up
5. The Shadow
6. Do You Love Me?
7. My Name
8. Look Who's Talking
9. Did Ya!
10. Implode
11. Waiting
12. Merry Chiri
13. Garden In The Air
14. Disturbance
15. Only One
16. Listen To My Heart
17. ID: Peace B
18. Valenti
19. Lose Your Mind
20. BUMP BUMP!
21. Not Over U
22. I Did It For Love
23. Girls On Top
24. No.1
25. Hope

Concert dates
Date	City	Country	Venue	Attendance
26 January 2013	Seoul	South Korea	Olympic Hall	6,000
27 January 2013	Seoul	South Korea	Olympic Hall	6,000
18 May 2013	Taipei	Taiwan	University of Taiwan Gymnasium	3,000
25 May 2013	Daegu	South Korea	EXCO Convention Center	—
1 June 2013	Busan	South Korea	KBS Hall	—

== BoA The Live 2014: Who's Back? ==
BoA The Live 2014: Who's Back? Set List
1. Shout It Out
2. Valenti
3. Listen To My Heart
4. Message
5. Eat You Up
6. Look Who's Talking
7. I Did It For Love
8. Jewel Song
9. Konoyo No Shirushi
10. Close To Me
11. Only One (Acoustic Version)
12. Brand New Beat
13. Cal my Name
14. Do The Motion
15. Lose Your Mind
16. Rock With You
17. ID: Peace B
18. Bump Bump!
19. Quincy
20. Masayume Chasing
21. First Time
22. Fly
23. Fun

Concert dates
Date	City	Country	Venue
6 September 2014	Tokyo	Japan	NHK Hall
7 September 2014	Tokyo	Japan	NHK Hall
14 September 2014	Nagoya	Japan	NTK Hall
20 September 2014	Osaka	Japan	Orix Theater
23 September 2014	Fukuoka	Japan	Fukuoka Convention Center

== BoA THE LIVE 2018 〜Unchained〜 ==
BoA THE LIVE 2018 〜Unchained〜 Set List
1. Where am I now
2. Arigatou Sayonara (Thank You Goodbye)
3. Konoyo No Shirushi
4. Only One
5. Do the Motion
6. Song with no Name
7. Close to Me
8. Baby You
9. Make Me Complete
10. Treasure (Bruno Mars cover)
11. Man in the Mirror (Michael Jackson cover)
12. Quincy
13. Make a Secret
14. Rock With You
15. Listen to my Heart
16. Shine We Are
17. Valenti
18. Jazzclub
19. Watashi Kono Mama de Ii no Kana
20. Fly

Concert dates
Date	City	Country	Venue
15 March 2018	Sapporo	Japan	Zepp Sapporo
21 March 2018	Fukuoka	Japan	Fukuoka Convention Center
23 March 2018	Nagoya	Japan	Zepp Nagoya
30 March 2018	Osaka	Japan	Zepp Osaka Bayside
31 March 2018	Osaka	Japan	Zepp Osaka Bayside
3 April 2018	Tokyo	Japan	Zepp Tokyo
4 April 2018	Tokyo	Japan	Zepp Tokyo

== BoA Live Tour 2019 #Mood ==
Concert dates
Date	City	Country	Venue
22 September 2019	Sagamihara	Japan	Sagami Women's University Green Hall
23 September 2019	Sagamihara	Japan	Sagami Women's University Green Hall
28 September 2019	Fukuoka	Japan	Fukuoka International Congress Center
30 September 2019	Saitama	Japan	Sonic City Hall
3 October 2019	Nagoya	Japan	NTK Hall Village Hall
13 October 2019	Osaka	Japan	Osaka NHK Hall
14 October 2019	Osaka	Japan	Osaka Mielparque Hall
26 October 2019	Seoul	South Korea	Olympic Hall
27 October 2019	Seoul	South Korea	Olympic Hall

== BoA Live Tour : BoA One's Own ==
"One's Own" is the first Asia tour headlined by BoA to commemorate her twenty-four debut anniversary.

On 28 June 2024, SM announced that BoA will be holding a two-day concerts to commemorate her twenty-four debut anniversary titled "BoA Live Tour : BoA One's Own" at Seoul's Olympic Handball Gymnasium on 12–13 October 2024. On 8 August, the dates of the Asia leg for the concert was announced. On 15 October, the concert promoter announced that her live tour in Jakarta was canceled.

Concert dates
Date	City	Country	Venue
12 October 2024	Seoul	South Korea	SK Olympic Handball Gymnasium
13 October 2024	Seoul	South Korea	SK Olympic Handball Gymnasium
23 November 2024	Taipei	Taiwan	National Taiwan University Sports Center
30 November 2024	Singapore		The Star Theatre

Cancelled dates
Date	City	Country	Venue	Reason
26 October 2024	Jakarta	Indonesia	GBK Basketball Hall	Unforeseen circumstances

== BoA Live Tour 2025 ==
While preparing for her planned 2025 tour in Japan, BoA was diagnosed with osteonecrosis on her knee, requiring surgery. All tour dates were officially cancelled on July 15, 2025.

Cancelled dates
Date	City	Country	Venue	Reason
20 September 2025	Osaka	Japan	Morinomiya Piloti Hall	Osteonecrosis requiring surgery
21 September 2025	Osaka	Japan	Morinomiya Piloti Hall	Osteonecrosis requiring surgery
27 September 2025	Fukuoka	Japan	Fukuoka Convention Center	Osteonecrosis requiring surgery
1 November 2025	Tokyo	Japan	Yoyogi National Gymnasium	Osteonecrosis requiring surgery

== BoA the LIVE 2026 ==
Concert dates
Date	City	Country	Venue
12 September 2026	Fukuoka	Japan	Fukuoka Convention Center
19 September 2026	Osaka	Japan	Zepp Namba
20 September 2026	Yokohama	Japan	Pacifico Yokohama

== Other concerts ==
=== BoA The Live 2007 X'mas ===
BoA The Live 2007 X'mas Set List
1. The Christmas Song
2. Love Letter
3. Rudolph The Red Nose Reindeer (Korean, Japanese & English)
4. Christmas Eve
5. Kimi No Tonari De
6. Winter Love
7. Sekai No Katasumi De
8. First Snow
9. Santa Baby
10. Do The Motion
11. Make A Secret
12. Flower
13. All I Want For Christmas If You
14. Konoyo No Shirushi
15. Diamond Heart
16. Jingle Bells
17. Lose Your Mind
18. With U
19. Meri Kuri

Concert dates
Date	City	Country	Venue
10 December 2007	Tokyo	Japan	Tokyo International Forum
11 December 2007	Tokyo	Japan	Tokyo International Forum

=== Best & USA Release Party: Thank You For Your Support! ===
BEST & USA Release Party: Thank You For Your Support! Set List
1. Valenti
2. Sweet Impact
3. Winter Love
4. Love Letter
5. Do The Motion
6. Dakishimeru
7. Eat You Up
8. I Did It For Love
9. Look Who's Talking
10. Universe (Feat Crystal Kay & Verbal)
11. Meri Kuri
12. Eien
13. Lose Your Mind

Concert dates
Date	City	Country	Venue
6 April 2009	Tokyo	Japan	Studio Coast

=== BoA The Live 2009 X'mas ===
BoA The Live 2009 X'mas Set List
1. Joy To The World
2. Kimi No Tonari De
3. Long Time No See
4. Style
5. This Christmas
6. White Wishes
7. The End
8. Mega Step
9. Eien
10. Rudolph The Red Nosed Reindeer
11. Bump Bump!
12. Midnight Parade
13. Billie Jean
14. Some Day One Day
15. Kokora No Tegami
16. Konoyo No Shirushi
17. Silent Night
18. Meri Kuri
19. Winter Love
20. First Snow

Concert dates
Date	City	Country	Venue
4 December 2009	Tokyo	Japan	Tokyo International Forum
5 December 2009	Tokyo	Japan	Tokyo International Forum
8 December 2009	Osaka	Japan	Osaka International Convention Center

=== BoA The Live 2010 X'mas ===
BoA The Live 2010 X'mas Set List
1. It's The Most Wonderful Time Of The Year
2. Konoyo No Shirushi
3. Woo Weekend
4. Eien
5. Possibility
6. Winter Love (Jazz Version)
7. This Is Who I Am
8. Prayer
9. Jingle Bell Rock
10. Santa Claus Is Coming To Town
11. First Snow (Acoustic Version)
12. Have Yourself A Merry Little Christmas
13. Moon Blue
14. Over
15. Bump Bump!
16. Quincy
17. I See Me
18. Give Love On Christmas Day
19. Meri Kuri

Concert dates
Date	City	Country	Venue	Attendance
20 December 2010	Tokyo	Japan	Tokyo International Forum	10,000
21 December 2010	Tokyo	Japan	Tokyo International Forum	10,000

=== BoA The Live 2011 X'mas: The 10th Anniversary Edition ===
BoA The Live 2011 X'mas: The 10th Anniversary Edition Set List
1. Let It Snow
2. Valenti
3. Kimochi Wa Tsutawaru
4. Listen To My Heart
5. Shine We Are!
6. No.1
7. Nanario No Ashita
8. Konoyo No Shirushi
9. Quincy
10. Jewel Song
11. Kimi No Tonari De
12. Someone Like You (Adele Cover)
13. Do The Motion
14. Kiseki
15. Rock With You
16. Lose Your Mind
17. Bump Bump!
18. Eien
19. I See Me
20. Milestone
21. Meri Kuri

Concert dates
Date	City	Country	Venue
10 December 2011	Tokyo	Japan	Tokyo International Forum
11 December 2011	Tokyo	Japan	Tokyo International Forum

=== BoA 2015 Special Live: Nowness ===
"Special Live 2015: Nowness" is BoA's 15th anniversary concert at Sejong Center for the Performing Arts in South Korea. BoA is the first female idol to hold a solo concert at this performing center. Only a few pop singers have ever held a concert at the Sejong Center in its entire history as it does not usually open up its venue to pop music performances.

BoA 2015 Special Live: Nowness
1. Girls On Top
2. The Shadow
3. Eat You Up
4. Kiss My Lips (Japanese version performed in Japan)
5. Shattered
6. Medley: Spark / MOTO / Smash / Bad Drive / BUMP BUMP!
7. 네모난 바퀴 (Hope)
8. Home
9. Only One (Acoustic ver.) (Japanese version performed in Japan)
10. Who Are You
11. Fox
12. Milky Way (Japanese version performed in Japan)
13. Medley: Valenti (Korean ver.) / My Name / Clockwork (Valenti – Japanese version performed in Japan)
14. Medley: SARA / ID; Peace B / My Sweetie / Shine We Are! / LISTEN TO MY HEART / Amazing Kiss / Rock With You (ID; Peace B (Japanese version) / 気持ちはつたわる were performed in Japan instead of SARA / ID; Peace B / My Sweetie)
15. Game
16. Shout It Out
17. Energetic
18. I Did It For Love
19. Lookbook (Only in Japan)
20. Masayume Chasing (EDM remix)
21. NO.1 (Not performed in Japan)

– Encore:

1. Atlantis Princess
2. Green Light
3. Hello (メリクリ was performed in Japan instead)

– Second Encore:

1. Merry-Chri (Korean ver.) (A cappella)

Concert dates
Date	City	Country	Venue	Attendance
22 August 2015	Seoul	South Korea	Sejong Center Grand Theater Hall	6,000
23 August 2015	Seoul	South Korea	Sejong Center Grand Theater Hall	6,000
11 December 2015	Tokyo	Japan	Tokyo International Forum Hall-A	5,000
Total				11,000

=== BoA THE LIVE 2018 "X'mas" ===
BoA THE LIVE 2018 "X'mas" / in SEOUL Set List
1. First Snow
2. Manhattan Tango
3. Mannish Chocolat
4. If
5. Only One
6. Home
7. Watashi Konomamade ii no Kana
8. Jewel Song
9. The Christmas Song (Japan) / Love of My Life (Queen cover – South Korea)
10. Winter Love
11. Woman
12. One Shot, Two Shot
13. Nega Dola
14. Amor
15. Jazzclub
16. Little More
17. No.1
18. Lookbook
19. Valenti
20. Merikuri
21. Love Letter (Japan) / I Want You Back (South Korea)

Billed as BoA THE LIVE 2018 "X'mas" in Japan and BoA THE LIVE 2018 in SEOUL in South Korea.

Concert dates
Date	City	Country	Venue
20 December 2018	Urayasu	Japan	Maihama Amphitheater
21 December 2018	Urayasu	Japan	Maihama Amphitheater
29 December 2018	Seoul	South Korea	Yes24 Live Hall
30 December 2018	Seoul	South Korea	Yes24 Live Hall

=== BoA 20th Anniversary Special Live "The Greatest" ===
The Greatest Set List
1. "Aggressive"
2. "Rock With You"
3. "Dakishimeru"
4. "Shine We Are!"
5. "Nanairo no Ashita -Brand New Beat-"
6. "Sweet Impact"
7. "Love Letter"
8. "Every Heart (Minna no Kimochi)"
9. "Kono Yo No Shirushi"
10. "Do the Motion"
11. "Make a Secret"
12. "Bump Bump!" featuring m-flo's Verbal
13. "Universe" featuring Crystal Kay & m-flo's Verbal
14. "Shout It Out"
15. "Listen to My Heart"
16. "Lose Your Mind"
17. Dancer Introduction ("Eat You Up")
18. "Only One" with TVXQ's Yunho
19. Medley 1 ("No. 1", "Double", "ID; Peace B", "Lookbook")
20. Medley 2 ("Kiseki/Miracle", "Kimochi wa Tsutawaru", "Amazing Kiss")
21. "Masayume Chasing"
22. "Valenti"

Encore:

1. "The Greatest"
2. "Next To You (Kimi Ni Tonari De)"
3. "Quincy"
4. "Long Time No See"

Date	City	Country	Venue	Attendance
29 May 2022	Tokyo	Japan	Yoyogi National Gymnasium	7,000

=== BoA 20th Anniversary Live "The BoA: Musicality" ===
The BoA: Musicality in Seoul Set List
1. "Breathe"
2. "Camo"
3. "Copy & Paste"
4. "Hurricane Venus"
5. "Forgive Me"
6. "Eat You Up"
7. "My Name"
8. "Zip"
9. "Better"
10. "Woman"
11. "Kiss My Lips"
12. "Atlantis Princess"
13. "My Sweetie"
14. "Who Are You"
15. "After Midnight"
16. "Garden in the Air"
17. "Nega Dola" + "Valenti" + "Spark"
18. "One Shot, Two Shot"
19. "L.O.V.E"
20. "Smash"
21. "Gravity"
22. "Merry-Chri"
23. "Only One"
24. "No. 1"

Encore:

1. "Girls on Top"
2. "MOTO"
3. "Little Bird"
4. "No Matter What" (Seoul – Day 2)

Date	City	Country	Venue	Attendance
11 March 2023	Seoul	South Korea	Olympic Hall	5,500
12 March 2023	Seoul	South Korea	Olympic Hall	5,500
1 April 2023	Busan	South Korea	BEXCO Auditorium	—
Total				N/A

=== 2026 Fan Concert 'BoA the MIC' ===
Date	City	Country	Venue	Attendance
27 June 2026	Seoul	South Korea	Yonsei University	—
28 June 2026	Seoul	South Korea	Yonsei University	—
29 August 2026	Macau	China	Lisboeta Macau	—
Total				N/A
