= Listen to My Heart (BoA album) =

Studio album by BoA
- Released: March 13, 2002
- Recorded: 2001–2002
- Studio: Avex Studio; Folio Sound; On Air Azabu Studio; Warner Studio; One Voice Studio; Sound City
- Genre: J-pop; pop; R&B
- Length: 61:31
- Label: Avex Trax
- Producer: Max Matsuura; Lee Soo-man; Ryuhei Chiba

BoA chronology
Jumping into the World (2001)	Listen to My Heart (2002)	No. 1 (2002)

Singles from Listen to My Heart
- 1. "ID; Peace B" Released: May 30, 2001; 2. "Amazing Kiss" Released: July 25, 2001; 3. "Kimochi wa Tsutawaru" Released: December 5, 2001; 4. "The Meaning of Peace" Released: December 19, 2001; 5. "Listen to My Heart" Released: January 17, 2002; 6. "Every Heart (Minna no Kimochi)" Released: March 13, 2002; 7. "Don't Start Now" Released: May 29, 2002

Listen to My Heart (stylized in all caps) is the debut Japanese studio album (second overall) by South Korean recording artist BoA, released via Avex Trax on March 13, 2002. BoA worked with a team of songwriters and composers to produce the album, including Natsumi Watanabe, Kazuhiro Hara, Ken Harada and Akira; all of whom would collaborate with BoA again on her future albums. Musically, Listen to My Heart is primarily a pop record with influences from R&B.

Listen to My Heart saw breakthrough success for a South Korean artist in Japan, where it became the first record by a Korean artist to attain the number one position on the Oricon Albums Chart and to receive a million certification by the Recording Industry Association of Japan (RIAJ) for shipments of over one million copies. BoA's successful debut in the country is considered by many to have opened the door for Korean artists in the Japanese music market.

Seven singles were spawned and promoted from Listen to My Heart. The album's first single, the Japanese version of her 2000 debut single "ID; Peace B," was released in May 2001 and marked her first single in Japan. It was met with modest success upon its release, reaching number 20 on the Oricon Singles Chart. Six singles were released afterwards including the title track "Listen to My Heart," which peaked at number five on the Oricon Singles Chart. "Every Heart (Minna no Kimochi)" was released alongside the album on March 13, and peaked at number ten.

== Background and composition ==
After debuting in South Korea, BoA announced her entry into the Japanese market by signing a recording contract with Avex Trax on March 7, 2001. On the same day, journalists from Taiwan, Hong Kong, and Japan gathered in Tokyo to cover her showcase (demonstration performance) at the Avex-owned discoteque, Velfarre, which Avex invested ₩700 million in. Tatsumi Yoda, the chairman of Avex at the time, stated: "BoA has the charisma, dance moves, and vocals to surpass the queen of J-Pop, Namie Amuro." BoA also released the special album Jumping into the World around the same time, which included songs sung in English and Mandarin. For the album Listen To My Heart, Avex Trax hired a handful of Japanese musicians such as Natsumi Watanabe, Kazuhiro Hara, Ken Harada, Akira, Bounceback, among many others to work on it. Between 2001 and 2002, the album was recorded in various studios in Japan, and was mastered by Chris Athens at Sterling Sound in New York City.

The album's title track is an R&B and dance pop song with the aim of sounding like Jennifer Lopez. The tracks "Power," "Don't Start Now" and "Dreams Come True" were originally sung in Korean on Jumping into the World. "Every Heart (Minna no Kimochi)" is an R&B pop ballad. "Kimochi wa Tsutawaru" is a mid-tempo track. "Share Your Heart (With Me)" is a pop ballad that speaks about sharing feelings with a significant other.

"Amazing Kiss" is an up-tempo bubblegum pop song. "Happiness" is a hip-hop number with light-hearted rhymes scattered throughout. "ID; Peace B" is a Japanese language adaptation of the title track for her debut Korean album. "Nothing's Gonna Change" is a glittering ballad with soft vocals. "The Meaning of Peace" was originally sung as a duet with labelmate Kumi Koda, but was changed into a solo in the album edition.

== Singles ==
On May 30, 2001, BoA officially debuted in Japan with the release of her debut single "ID; Peace B." The song was a moderate success, just entering in the top 20 on the Oricon Singles Chart. The album's second single "Amazing Kiss" was released on July 25, 2001; it peaked at number 23 on the Oricon Singles Chart. "Kimochi wa Tsutawaru" and "The Meaning of Peace" were subsequently made available in December of that year; the latter single was released as a collaboration with fellow Japanese singer Kumi Koda for the Song Nation project, which was created to help raise funds for the victims of the September 11 attacks. It peaked at number 12 and remained on the charts for seven weeks. "Kimochi wa Tsutawaru" peaked at number 15 on the chart, making it BoA's first single to appear in the top 15.

The titular single "Listen to My Heart" was released on January 17, 2002. It became BoA's first release to peak in the top five on the Oricon Singles Chart, as well as her first release to receive a gold certification from the Recording Industry Association of Japan (RIAJ) for selling over 100,000 copies. "Every Heart (Minna no Kimochi)" was released on the same day as the album. It saw modest levels of commercial success, peaking at number ten. The single was the first Copy Control release in Japan. "Every Heart (Minna no Kimochi)" also served as the ending theme to the popular anime Inuyasha.

"Don't Start Now" was re-recorded and released as the album's last single on May 29, 2002. The original song was written by Jeff Vincent and Peter Rafelson and was included on the 2001 eponymous album by American pop singer Brooke Allison, titled "Toodle-oo." The only difference between "Toodle-oo" and BoA's English version is the line, "Time for you to find a ho in hosiery," is altered to BoA's more age-appropriate line, "Time for you to find another fantasy." "Don't Start Now" peaked at number 17 and charted for only three weeks.

== Accolades ==
Listen to My Heart won Rock & Pop Album of the Year at the 17th Japan Gold Disc Awards. The title track of the same name received the Gold Award at the 44th Japan Record Awards.

== Commercial performance ==
Listen To My Heart was a commercial success, debuting at number one on the Oricon Albums Chart and selling 230,590 copies in its first week. This made BoA the first Korean artist and the first non-Japanese Asian in history to top the weekly albums chart in Japan. Listen To My Heart descended to number two on its second week, selling 140,150 copies. The album fell to number six on its third week on the chart, selling 100,970 copies. It climbed to number five the following week, selling 61,840 copies. The album spent the next two weeks charting at number six and number five, selling 42,680 copies on it fifth week, and 32,190 copies on its sixth week. The album ranked in the top 300 chart for 91 weeks in total, making it BoA's longest-charting album to date. Listen To My Heart sold 816,690 copies by the end of 2002, making it the 12th best-selling album of the year. It was certified million by the Recording Industry Association of Japan (RIAJ) for selling over one million copies.

== Legacy ==
BoA's successful debut in Japan is regarded by journalists for having helped improved the image of South Korea in the country. BoA's ascent to fame took place during a particularly challenging period in modern Japan-South Korea relations. Despite this, BoA continued to act as a cultural ambassador between Seoul and Tokyo, with The Diplomat noting how BoA's breakthrough in Japan in 2002 helped break down barriers that might have otherwise hindered the Japanese public from cultivating a significant interest in Korean pop culture and entertainment. In 2003, the Japanese Foreign Ministry formally invited BoA to a diplomatic dinner between prime minister Junichiro Koizumi and South Korean president Roh Moo-hyun, signifying a mutual recognition of BoA as a cultural bridge between the Japanese and Korean music markets.

Editors have credited BoA for laying the groundwork for future K-pop idols to debut in the Japanese market, including TVXQ, Girls’ Generation, Exo and BTS, despite the strained relations between South Korea and Japan. The practice of teaching foreign languages such as Japanese, Chinese, or English to K-pop trainees subsequently became a widespread trend among South Korean entertainment companies.

== Track listing ==
Listen to My Heart track listing
No.	Title	Lyrics	Music	Arrangement	Length
1.	"Listen to My Heart"	Natsumi Watanabe	Kazuhiro Hara	Kazuhiro Hara	3:57
2.	"Power"	Maki Mihara	Ken Harada	Ken Harada	4:10
3.	"Every Heart (Minna no Kimochi)"	Natsumi Watanabe	Bounceback	h•wonder	4:33
4.	"Don't Start Now"	Yoo Young Jin; Yuko Ebine	Peter Rafeison; Jeff Vincent	Peter Rafeison; Jeff Vincent	3:55
5.	"Kimochi wa Tsutawaru"	Shin Youn Ah	Bounceback	Akira	4:23
6.	"Share Your Heart (With Me)"	Yuko Ebine	Tetsuya Muramatsu	Akira	4:37
7.	"Dreams Come True"	Maki Mihara	Ken Harada	Ken Harada	4:55
8.	"Amazing Kiss"	Bounceback	Bounceback	Ken Harada; Bounceback	4:34
9.	"Happiness"	Maho Fukami	Maho Fukami	Ken Harada	4:33
10.	"ID; Peace B"	Yoo Young Jin; Mai Matsumuro	Yoo Young Jin	Yoo Young Jin	3:34
11.	"Nobody But You"	Natsumi Watanabe	Kosuke Morimoto	Akira	3:46
12.	"Nothing's Gonna Change"	BoA; Natsumi Watanabe	BoA	Kai	5:23
13.	"Listen to My Heart" (Hex Hector Main Mix) (English Version)	Natsumi Watanabe	Kazuhiro Hara	Kazuhiro Hara	4:10
14.	"The Meaning of Peace"	Tetsuya Komuro	Tetsuya Komuro	Tetsuya Komuro; Max Matsuura	5:01
Total length:					61:31

== Charts ==
=== Weekly charts ===
Chart (2002)	Peak position
Japanese Albums (Oricon)	1

=== Monthly charts ===
Chart (2002–2004)	Peak position
Japanese Albums (Oricon)	5
South Korean Int'l Albums (MIAK)	5

=== Yearly charts ===
Chart (2002)	Position
Japanese Albums (Oricon)	12

Chart (2004)	Position
South Korean Int'l Albums (MIAK)	33

== Sales and certifications ==
Region	Certification	Certified units/sales
Japan (RIAJ)	Million	931,742
South Korea	—	13,189

== Release history ==
Region	Date	Format	Label
Japan	March 13, 2002	CD	Avex Trax
South Korea	March 3, 2004	CD; digital download	Avex Inc.; SM Entertainment
