= Gold (Cher album) =

Greatest hits album by Cher
- Released: March 1, 2005
- Recorded: 1964–2001
- Genre: Pop rock; folk; house; dance-pop; disco; country
- Length: 114:39
- Label: Geffen
- Producer: Sonny Bono; Snuff Garrett; Bob Esty; Michael Bolton; Desmond Child; Peter Asher; Guy Roche; Diane Warren; Bob Rock; Richie Zito; Stephen Lipson; Mark Taylor; Brian Bawling; Johan Aberg; Anders Hansson

Cher chronology
Live! The Farewell Tour (2003)	Gold (2005)	Burlesque (2010)

Gold is the ninth U.S. compilation album by American singer-actress Cher, released on March 1, 2005, by Geffen Records. The album was released only two years after the multi-platinum The Very Best of Cher. As of August 2010, the album has sold 88,000 copies in the United States. The album was certified silver by the British Phonographic Industry (BPI) in 2019 for selling over 60,000 copies.

== Critical reception ==
Professional ratings
Review scores
Source	Rating
AllMusic	4.5/5 stars

Tim Sendra of AllMusic gave the compilation four-and-a-half out of five stars and stated "...this is a disc that will certainly please the fans who want a sampling of her career and don't really want rarities or surprises."

== Track listing ==
Disc 1
No.	Title	Writer(s)	Length
1.	"I Got You Babe" (Sonny & Cher)	Sonny Bono	3:09
2.	"Baby Don't Go" (Sonny & Cher)	Bono	3:12
3.	"All I Really Want to Do"	Bob Dylan	2:58
4.	"Bang Bang (My Baby Shot Me Down)"	Bono	3:45
5.	"Alfie"	Burt Bacharach, Hal David	3:01
6.	"The Beat Goes On" (Sonny & Cher)	Bono	3:29
7.	"You Better Sit Down Kids"	Bono	4:10
8.	"Gypsys, Tramps & Thieves"	Bob Stone	2:38
9.	"The Way of Love"	Al Stillman, Jacques Dieval	2:34
10.	"All I Ever Need Is You" (Sonny & Cher)	Jimmy Holiday, Eddie Reeves	2:41
11.	"Living in a House Divided"	Tom Bahler	2:59
12.	"A Cowboy's Work Is Never Done" (Sonny & Cher)	Bono	3:18
13.	"Half-Breed"	Mary Dean, Al Capps	2:46
14.	"Dark Lady"	Johnny Durrill	3:29
15.	"Train of Thought"	Alan O'Day	2:38
16.	"Take Me Home" (Extended Version)	Bob Esty, Michele Aller	6:46

Disc 2
No.	Title	Writer(s)	Length
1.	"I Found Someone"	Michael Bolton, Mark Mangold	3:46
2.	"We All Sleep Alone"	Jon Bon Jovi, Desmond Child, Richie Sambora	3:54
3.	"After All" (Love Theme from Chances Are) (with Peter Cetera)	Tom Snow, Dean Pitchford	4:07
4.	"If I Could Turn Back Time"	Diane Warren	4:03
5.	"Just Like Jesse James"	Warren, Child	4:07
6.	"Heart of Stone†" (Remix)	Andy Hill, Pete Sinfield	4:20
7.	"The Shoop Shoop Song (It's in His Kiss)"	Rudy Clark	2:53
8.	"Love and Understanding"	Warren	4:44
9.	"Save Up All Your Tears"	Warren, Child	3:56
10.	"Love Hurts" (1991 version)	Boudleaux Bryant, Felice Bryant	4:18
11.	"One by One" (Junior Vasquez Vocal Edit)	Anthony Griffiths	4:25
12.	"Believe"	Cher (Uncredited), Brian Higgins, Stuart McLennen, Paul Barry, Steven Torch, Matthew Gray, Timothy Powell	4:01
13.	"Strong Enough"	Mark Taylor, Barry	3:43
14.	"All or Nothing"	Taylor, Barry	4:00
15.	"Song for the Lonely" (Edit)	Taylor, Barry, Torch	3:25
16.	"A Different Kind of Love Song" (Rodney Jerkins Main Mix - Faster)	Johan Aberg, Michelle Lewis, Sigurd Rosnes	4:19

Notes

- "Believe" features writing contribution by Cher who remains uncredited.
- †The remix of "Heart of Stone" is the same one found on If I Could Turn Back Time: Cher's Greatest Hits, also released by Geffen Records.

== Personnel ==
- Cher - main vocals
- Sonny Bono - main vocals
- Peter Cetera - main vocals

Production

- Mike Ragogna - compilation producer
- Bill Inglot - mastering
- Dan Hersch - mastering

Design

- Kevyn Aucoin - photography
- Michael Lavine - photography

== Charts and certifications ==
=== Weekly charts ===
Chart (2011–18)	Peak position
Scottish Albums (OCC)	11
Swedish Albums (Sverigetopplistan)	34

=== Certifications and sales ===
Region	Certification	Certified units/sales
United Kingdom (BPI)	Silver	60,000^{‡}
United States	—	88,000
^{‡} Sales+streaming figures based on certification alone.
