= Forever (Cher album) =

Greatest hits album by Cher
- Released: September 20, 2024
- Studio: WBM
- Genres: Pop; rock; dance
- Length: 83:25 (Standard version); 159:15 (Forever Fan version)
- Label: Warner

Cher chronology
Christmas (2023)	Forever (2024)	Christmas DJ Party Edition (2026)

Forever is the eleventh greatest hits album by Cher, released September 20, 2024, through Warner Records. The compilation was released in two versions: the first, Forever, featured 21 of the singer's best-known tracks; the second version, Forever Fan, contained a total of 40 tracks.

== Background ==
Cher announced the compilation release on August 1, 2024. The 21-track standard edition of the album was released on CD and a special double vinyl package "printed on silver foil board with translucent vinyl," while the Forever Fan edition is a digital release available on all streaming outlets. Rolling Stone noted the omission of "Half-Breed" (1973), a Billboard Hot 100 number one hit, and suggested that Cher is "among a growing list of legacy acts rethinking songs and artwork that may not hold up today."

== Singles ==
On the day of the album's announcement, Cher released the promotional single "A Woman's Story". The song was remastered and available on digital for the first time after only being previously released on a 45 rpm single in 1974.

== Critical reception ==
Professional ratings
Review scores
Source	Rating
Retropop	4/5 stars

Connor Gotto, reviewing Forever for Retropop, praised the "remarkably strong collection", adding that it showcases Cher as the "undisputed Goddess of Pop".

== Commercial performance ==
In the United States, Forever debuted at number 163 on the Billboard 200 albums chart. In the United Kingdom, the album debuted at number 44 on the Official Albums Chart.

== Track listing ==
All songs have been remastered and are credited as "2024 remaster".

Forever – standard edition track listing
No.	Title	Writer(s)	Producer(s)	Length
1.	"Believe"	Brian Higgins; Stuart McLennen; Paul Barry; Steven Torch; Matthew Gray; Timothy Powell	Mark Taylor; Brian Rawling	3:59
2.	"If I Could Turn Back Time"	Diane Warren	Warren; Guy Roche	4:12
3.	"Walking in Memphis"	Mark Cohn	Christopher Neil	3:56
4.	"Song for the Lonely"	Taylor; Barry; Steve Torch	Taylor	3:21
5.	"Strong Enough"	Taylor; Barry	Taylor	3:41
6.	"The Shoop Shoop Song (It's in His Kiss)"	Rudy Clark	Peter Asher	2:47
7.	"SOS"	Benny Andersson; Björn Ulvaeus; Stig Anderson	Taylor	3:21
8.	"I Found Someone"	Michael Bolton; Mark Mangold	Bolton	3:42
9.	"Save Up All Your Tears"	Desmond Child; Diane Warren	Richie Zito; Bob Rock	3:57
10.	"One by One"	Anthony Griffiths; Cher	Stephen Lipson; Sam Ward	5:02
11.	"After All (Love Theme from Chances Are)"	Dean Pitchford; Tom Snow	Asher	4:03
12.	"Heart of Stone"	Andy Hill; Pete Sinfield	Asher	4:17
13.	"The Way of Love"	Jacques Dieval; Al Stillman	Snuff Garrett	2:31
14.	"I Hope You Find It"	Steven Robson; Jeffrey Steele	Taylor	3:45
15.	"Take Me Home"	Michele Aller; Bob Esty	Esty	6:44
16.	"Gimme! Gimme! Gimme! (A Man After Midnight)" (extended version)	Andersson; Ulvaeus	Taylor	7:25
17.	"Woman's World"	Matt Morris; Paul Oakenfold; Anthony "TC" Crawford; Joshua "JD" Walker	Oakenfold	3:42
18.	"Gypsys, Tramps & Thieves"	Bob Stone	Garrett	2:36
19.	"Dark Lady"	Johnny Durrill	Garrett	3:25
20.	"You Haven't Seen the Last of Me"	Warren	Matt Serletic; Taylor	3:30
21.	"DJ Play a Christmas Song"	Sarah Hudson; Jesse Saint John; Brett McLaughlin; James Abrahart; Mark Schick; Lionel Crasta	Taylor	3:29

Forever Fan – digital deluxe edition track listing
No.	Title	Writer(s)	Producer(s)	Length
22.	"A Woman's Story"	April Stevens; Nino Tempo; Phil Spector	Mark Taylor; Brian Rawling	3:58
23.	"Love and Understanding"	Warren	Roche; Warren	4:40
24.	"All or Nothing"	Taylor; Barry	Taylor; Rawling	4:40
25.	"A Different Kind of Love Song"	Johan Åberg; Michelle Lewis; Sigurd Røsnes	Åberg; Anders Hansson	3:53
26.	"Just Like Jesse James"	Desmond Child; Warren	Child	4:07
27.	"We All Sleep Alone"	Jon Bon Jovi; Richie Sambora; Child	Bon Jovi; Sambora; Child	3:48
28.	"The Music's No Good Without You"	Cher; James Thomas; Mark Taylor; Barry	Thomas; Taylor; Jeff Taylor	4:44
29.	"Dov'è l'amore"	Taylor; Barry	Taylor; Barry	4:17
30.	"Still"	Cher; Bruce Roberts; Bob Thiele	Cher; Roberts	6:15
31.	"Welcome to Burlesque"	Charlie Midnight; Matthew Gerrard; Steve Lindsey; John Patrick Shanley	Lindsey; Gerrard; Taylor^{[a]}	2:47
32.	"One of Us"	Benny Andersson; Björn Ulvaeus	Taylor	3:52
33.	"I'd Rather Believe in You"	Michael Omartian; Stormie Omartian	Steve Barri; M. Omartian	3:52
34.	"Move Me" (with Gregg Allman)	Fred Beckmeier; Vella M. Cameron; Steve Beckmeier; Jimmie Cameron	Allman; Johnny Sandlin; John Haeny	2:58
35.	"I Paralyze"	John Farrar; Steve Kipner	Farrar	3:48
36.	"The Beat Goes On" (as Sonny & Cher)	Sonny Bono	S. Bono	3:29
37.	"Bang Bang (My Baby Shot Me Down)"	S. Bono	S. Bono	2:45
38.	"Baby Don't Go" (as Sonny & Cher)	S. Bono	S. Bono	3:11
39.	"I Got You Babe" (as Sonny & Cher)	S. Bono	S. Bono	3:10
40.	"I Still Haven't Found What I'm Looking For" (live)	Bono	Cher; Lindsay Scott; Roger Davies	4:36

Notes

- ^{^[a]} denotes vocal producer
- Physical editions of Forever contain the single version of "Take Me Home" (3:30) and the original album version of "Gimme! Gimme! Gimme! (A Man After Midnight)" (4:11).

== Charts ==
Weekly chart performance for Forever
Chart (2024)	Peak position
Australian Physical Albums (ARIA)	26
Austrian Albums (Ö3 Austria)	41
Belgian Albums (Ultratop Flanders)	135
Belgian Albums (Ultratop Wallonia)	79
Croatian International Albums (HDU)	16
Danish Vinyl Albums (Hitlisten)	16
French Albums (SNEP)	149
German Albums (Offizielle Top 100)	28
Hungarian Albums (MAHASZ)	23
Poland Physical Albums (ZPAV)	74
Portuguese Albums (AFP)	146
Scottish Albums (Official Charts)	10
Spanish Albums (PROMUSICAE)	52
Swiss Albums (Schweizer Hitparade)	39
Swiss Albums (Schweizer Hitparade Romandy)	14
UK Albums (Official Charts)	44
US Billboard 200	163

== Certifications and sales ==
Certifications and sales for Forever
Region	Certification	Certified units/sales
United Kingdom (BPI)	Gold	100,000^{‡}
^{‡} Sales+streaming figures based on certification alone.
