= The Very Best of Cher =

Greatest hits album by Cher
- Released: April 1, 2003
- Recorded: 1964–2001
- Genres: Pop rock; dance-pop; disco; house
- Length: 75:22 (US)
- Label: Warner Bros.
- Producer: David McLees

Cher chronology
Living Proof (2001)	The Very Best of Cher (2003)	Live! The Farewell Tour (2003)

The Very Best of Cher is the eighth compilation album by American singer-actress Cher, released on April 1, 2003. The album includes many of Cher's most popular songs, such as "If I Could Turn Back Time", "Believe", "Gypsies, Tramps and Thieves" and "Take Me Home". The original North American edition contains 21 tracks, while international reissues featured expanded track lists and alternate song selections.

Released during Cher's Living Proof: The Farewell Tour, the compilation received favorable reviews from music critics, who praised its broad overview of the singer's career and its collection of hits spanning multiple decades. Commercially, the album became one of Cher's most successful compilations, reaching number four on the Billboard 200 and remaining on the chart for fifty-one weeks. By 2011, it had sold 2.8 million copies in the United States.

== Album information ==
The Very Best of Cher was released by Warner Bros. Records, MCA, and Geffen Records. The original US edition features 21 tracks, while the various later editions typically feature more songs or different selections.

The album originally coincided with the Living Proof: The Farewell Tour. The album cover picture is also seen on the DVD The Farewell Tour and was originally planned to be the DVD cover of The Very Best of Cher: The Video Hits Collection as well, but was changed at the last minute.

== Critical reception ==
Professional ratings
Review scores
Source	Rating
AllMusic	4.5/5 stars
The Encyclopedia of Popular Music	3/5 stars
The Gazette	3/5 stars
The Rolling Stone Album Guide	3.5/5 stars

AllMusic considered the album "closer than any previous collection" to offering "a fully rounded portrait" of Cher's career, praising the inclusion of major hits from different eras, although criticizing the "bewildering" sequencing that "hurts the general listenability of the record". Billboard described the album as a "special—and well worth owning" for combining material from "several labels and key periods" of Cher's career, while praising her ability to remain "remarkably effective" at following musical trends "without ever shedding or compromising her own unique qualities". The Gazette described the album as "loaded with kitsch and a surprising number of hook-laden hits".

== Commercial performance ==
The commercial success of The Very Best of Cher, combined with the Farewell Tour, consolidated one of the most profitable periods of Cher's career in 2003. The compilation debuted at number seven on the Billboard 200 albums chart with 122,000 copies and later reached number four on the issue date of May 17. It spent a total of fifty-one weeks on the chart. By November 2011, it had sold 2.8 million copies in the United States. The compilation generated approximately US$31.2 million in album sales in 2003, its commercial performance led to Warner Bros. chairman/CEO Tom Whalley's decision to sign the superstar to the U.S. division in a worldwide deal.

== Track listing ==
International edition: disc 1
No.	Title	Writer(s)	Producer(s)	Length
1.	"Believe" (from Believe, 1998)	Paul Barry; Matthew Gray; Brian Higgins; Stuart McLennen; Timothy Powell; Steven Torch	Mark Taylor; Brian Rawling	4:01
2.	"Strong Enough" (from Believe, 1998)	Mark Taylor; Barry	Mark Taylor; Rawling	3:43
3.	"If I Could Turn Back Time" (from Heart of Stone, 1989)	Diane Warren	Warren; Guy Roche	4:03
4.	"I Found Someone" (from Cher, 1987)	Michael Bolton; Mark Mangold	Bolton	3:46
5.	"Song for the Lonely" (from Living Proof, 2001)	Mark Taylor; Barry; Torch	Mark Taylor; Rawling	3:29
6.	"Walking in Memphis" (from It's a Man's World, 1995)	Marc Cohn	Christopher Neil	3:58
7.	"Just Like Jesse James" (from Heart of Stone, 1989)	Desmond Child; Warren	Child	4:07
8.	"One by One" (from It's a Man's World, 1995)	Anthony Griffiths	Stephen Lipson	5:06
9.	"Love and Understanding" (from Love Hurts, 1991)	Warren	Roche; Warren	4:44
10.	"Save Up All Your Tears" (from Love Hurts, 1991)	Child; Warren	Richie Zito; Bob Rock	4:00
11.	"Più che puoi" (Eros Ramazzotti featuring Cher, from Stilelibero, 2001)	Antonio Galbiati; Eros Ramazzotti; Adelio Cogliati; Cher	Rick Nowels	4:11
12.	"Love Can Build a Bridge" (with Chrissie Hynde and Neneh Cherry)	John Barlow Jarvis; Naomi Judd; Paul Overstreet	Peter Asher	4:16
13.	"Take Me Home" (from Take Me Home, 1979)	Michelle Aller; Bob Esty	Esty	3:26
14.	"Rudy" (from I Paralyze, 1982)	Jacques Morali; Henri Belolo; Dennis Frederiksen; Howie Epstein; Jimmy Hunter; Mark Maierhoffer	David Wolfert	3:54
15.	"Bad Love" (from Foxes soundtrack, 1980)	Cher; Giorgio Moroder	Moroder	5:29
16.	"When the Money's Gone" (from Living Proof, 2001)	Bruce Roberts; Donna Weiss	Roberts; Warren Rigg	3:44
17.	"All or Nothing" (from Believe, 1998)	Mark Taylor; Barry	Mark Taylor; Rawling	4:00
18.	"Alive Again" (from Living Proof, 2001)	Chicane; Ray Hedges; Tracy Ackerman	Chicane; Mark Taylor; Nigel Butler; Hedges	4:19
19.	"A Different Kind of Love Song" (from Living Proof, 2001)	Johan Åberg; Michelle Lewis; Sigurd Røsnes	Åberg; Anders Hansson	3:51

International edition: disc 2
No.	Title	Writer(s)	Producer(s)	Length
1.	"The Shoop Shoop Song (It's in His Kiss)" (from Mermaids soundtrack, 1990)	Rudy Clark	Asher	2:53
2.	"Heart of Stone" (from Heart of Stone, 1989)	Andy Hill; Peter Sinfield	Asher	4:20
3.	"Dov'è l'amore" (Emilio Estefan Jnr. Mix, from Believe, 1998)	Mark Taylor; Barry	Mark Taylor	3:44
4.	"The Music's No Good Without You" (from Living Proof, 2001)	Cher; James Thomas; Mark Taylor; Barry	Thomas; Jeff Taylor; Mark Taylor	4:42
5.	"Gypsies, Tramps & Thieves" (from Chér, 1971)	Bob Stone	Snuff Garrett	2:38
6.	"Half-Breed" (from Half-Breed, 1973)	Al Capps; Mary Dean	Garrett	2:46
7.	"Dark Lady" (from Dark Lady, 1974)	Johnny Durrill	Garrett	3:29
8.	"I Got You Babe" (Sonny & Cher) (from Look at Us, 1965)	Sonny Bono	Bono	3:09
9.	"The Beat Goes On" (Sonny & Cher) (from In Case You're in Love, 1967)	Bono	Bono	3:29
10.	"Bang Bang (My Baby Shot Me Down)" (original version, from The Sonny Side of Chér, 1966)	Bono	Bono	2:44
11.	"The Way of Love" (from Chér, 1971)	Al Stillman; Jacques Dieval	Garrett	2:34
12.	"All I Really Want to Do" (from All I Really Want to Do, 1965)	Bob Dylan	Bono	2:58
13.	"Train of Thought" (from Dark Lady, 1974)	Alan O'Day	Garrett	2:34
14.	"A Cowboy's Work Is Never Done" (Sonny & Cher) (from All I Ever Need Is You, 1971)	Bono	Bono; Garrett	3:14
15.	"We All Sleep Alone" (from Cher, 1987)	Jon Bon Jovi; Richie Sambora; Child	Bon Jovi; Sambora; Child	3:54
16.	"Love Hurts" (from Love Hurts, 1991)	Boudleaux Bryant	Zito	4:19
17.	"Not Enough Love in the World" (from It's a Man's World', 1995)	Don Henley; Danny Kortchmar; Benmont Tench	Lipson	4:23
18.	"Born With the Hunger" (from Not.com.mercial, 2000)	Shirley Eikhard	Cher; Roberts	4:05
19.	"After All" (Love Theme from Chances Are) (duet with Peter Cetera, from Heart of Stone, 1989)	Dean Pitchford; Tom Snow	Asher	4:07
20.	"All I Ever Need Is You" (Sonny & Cher) (from All I Ever Need Is You, 1971)	Jimmy Holiday; Eddie Reeves	Garrett	2:38
21.	"Baby Don't Go" (Sonny & Cher) (from Baby Don't Go, 1965)	Bono	Bono	3:05
22.	"Dead Ringer for Love" (Meat Loaf featuring Cher, from Dead Ringer, 1981)	Jim Steinman	Steve Popovich; Sam Lederman; Stan Snyder; Meat Loaf; Stephan Galfas; Steinman; Jimmy Iovine	4:24
23.	"Bang Bang (My Baby Shot Me Down)" (from Cher, 1987)	Bono	Bon Jovi; Child; Sambora	3:51

French edition
No.	Title	Length
1.	"Believe"	4:00
2.	"The Shoop Shoop Song (It's in His Kiss)"	2:53
3.	"If I Could Turn Back Time"	4:03
4.	"Heart of Stone"	4:20
5.	"Love and Understanding"	4:44
6.	"Just Like Jesse James"	4:07
7.	"I Found Someone"	3:46
8.	"One by One"	5:06
9.	"Strong Enough"	3:43
10.	"Più che puoi" (with Eros Ramazzotti)	4:11
11.	"Walking in Memphis"	3:58
12.	"Love Can Build a Bridge" (with Chrissie Hynde and Neneh Cherry)	4:16
13.	"All I Really Want to Do"	2:58
14.	"Bang Bang (My Baby Shot Me Down)"	3:54
15.	"Gypsys, Tramps & Thieves"	2:38
16.	"The Beat Goes On" (Sonny & Cher)	3:29
17.	"I Got You Babe" (Sonny & Cher)	3:09
18.	"Dov'è l'amore" (Emilio Estefan Jnr. Mix)	3:44
19.	"Save Up All Your Tears"	4:00
20.	"A Different Kind of Love Song"	3:51
21.	"The Music's No Good Without You"	4:42

UK edition
No.	Title	Length
1.	"Believe"	4:00
2.	"If I Could Turn Back Time"	4:03
3.	"Save Up All Your Tears"	4:00
4.	"Walking in Memphis"	3:58
5.	"The Shoop Shoop Song (It's in His Kiss)"	2:53
6.	"Love and Understanding"	4:44
7.	"I Found Someone"	3:46
8.	"Just Like Jesse James"	4:07
9.	"One by One"	5:06
10.	"Love Can Build a Bridge" (with Chrissie Hynde and Neneh Cherry)	4:16
11.	"Strong Enough"	3:43
12.	"All or Nothing"	3:58
13.	"A Different Kind of Love Song"	3:51
14.	"Heart of Stone"	4:20
15.	"The Music's No Good Without You"	4:42
16.	"Dov'è l'amore" (Emilio Estefan Jnr. Mix)	3:44
17.	"Gypsys, Tramps & Thieves"	2:38
18.	"The Beat Goes On" (Sonny & Cher)	3:29
19.	"I Got You Babe" (Sonny & Cher)	3:09
20.	"All I Really Want to Do"	2:58
21.	"Bang Bang (My Baby Shot Me Down)"	2:44

US edition
No.	Title	Length
1.	"Believe"	3:59
2.	"If I Could Turn Back Time"	4:00
3.	"Heart of Stone"	4:11
4.	"Just Like Jesse James"	4:07
5.	"Save Up All Your Tears"	4:00
6.	"After All" (Love Theme from Chances Are) (duet with Peter Cetera)	4:05
7.	"I Found Someone"	3:44
8.	"One by One" (Junior Vasquez Vocal Edit)	4:23
9.	"Strong Enough"	3:43
10.	"All or Nothing"	3:58
11.	"Song for the Lonely"	3:22
12.	"Take Me Home"	3:28
13.	"The Shoop Shoop Song (It's in His Kiss)"	2:52
14.	"All I Really Want to Do"	2:58
15.	"Bang Bang (My Baby Shot Me Down)"	2:44
16.	"Half-Breed"	2:45
17.	"Gypsies, Tramps & Thieves"	2:36
18.	"Dark Lady"	3:28
19.	"The Beat Goes On"	3:29
20.	"I Got You Babe"	3:11
21.	"A Different Kind of Love Song" (Rodney Jerkins Main Mix (Faster))	4:19

North American special edition bonus disc: Live! The Farewell Tour
No.	Title	Writer(s)	Length
1.	"I Still Haven't Found What I'm Looking For"	Adam Clayton; The Edge; Bono; Larry Mullen Jr.	4:35
2.	"Song for the Lonely"	Mark Taylor; Paul Barry; Steven Torch	6:47
3.	"All or Nothing"	Taylor; Barry	3:58
4.	"I Found Someone"	Michael Bolton; Mark Mangold	3:36
5.	"Bang Bang (My Baby Shot Me Down)"	Sonny Bono	3:41
6.	"All I Really Want to Do"	Bob Dylan	2:01
7.	"Half-Breed"	Al Capps; Mary Dean	1:34
8.	"Gypsies, Tramps & Thieves"	Bob Stone	1:31
9.	"Dark Lady"	Johnny Durrill	1:13
10.	"Take Me Home"	Michele Aller; Bob Esty	3:48
11.	"The Way of Love"	Al Stillman; Jacques Dieval	2:34
12.	"After All" (Love Theme from Chances Are)	Dean Pitchford; Tom Snow	3:54
13.	"Just Like Jesse James"	Desmond Child; Diane Warren	5:39
14.	"Heart of Stone"	Andy Hill; Peter Sinfield	4:09
15.	"The Shoop Shoop Song (It's in His Kiss)"	Rudy Clark	2:30
16.	"Strong Enough"	Taylor; Barry	3:01
17.	"If I Could Turn Back Time"	Warren	6:17
18.	"Believe"	Barry; Matthew Gray; Brian Higgins; Stuart McLennen; Timothy Powell; Steven Torch	6:49

Notes

- "Believe" features writing contribution by Cher who remains uncredited.

== Personnel ==
"Believe" (1998)
Cher's best selling record was received with positive reviews.

- Producers: Sonny Bono, Peter Asher, Michael Bolton, Desmond Child, Bob Esty, Snuff Garrett, Steve Lipson, Giorgio Moroder, Brian Rawling, Guy Roche, Bob Rock, Mark Taylor, Diane Warren, Richie Zito
- Executive producer: Cher
- Compilation producer: David MacLees
- Remastering: Bill Inglot, Dan Hersch
- Remixing: Junior Vasquez
- Editorial supervision: Sheryl Farber
- Annotation: Steve Woolard
- Art direction: Jeri Heiden
- Art direction: Hugh Brown
- Design: Barrie Goshko
- Photography: Sonny Bono
- Photography: Norman Seeff
- Photography: Harry Langdon
- Photography: Kevyn Aucoin
- Project assistant: Leigh Hall
- Project assistant: April Milek
- Project assistant: Randy Perry
- Project assistant: Tim Scanlin
- Liner notes: Kurt Loder

== Charts ==
=== Weekly charts ===
2003 weekly chart performance for The Very Best of Cher
Chart (2003)	Peak position
Australian Albums (ARIA)	12
Austrian Albums (Ö3 Austria)	17
Belgian Albums (Ultratop Flanders)	29
Canadian Albums (Billboard)	18
Danish Albums (Hitlisten)	10
Dutch Albums (Album Top 100)	60
European Albums (Top 100)	45
French Compilations (SNEP)	25
German Albums (Offizielle Top 100)	31
Hungarian Albums (MAHASZ)	31
Italian Albums (FIMI)	67
Italian Albums (Musica e dischi)	41
Norwegian Albums (VG-lista)	27
Polish Albums (ZPAV)	38
Quebec Albums (ADISQ)	45
Scottish Albums (Official Charts)	9
South African Albums (RISA)	11
Swedish Albums (Sverigetopplistan)	2
Swiss Albums (Schweizer Hitparade)	10
UK Albums (Official Charts)	17
US Billboard 200	4
US Billboard Top Internet Albums	1

2008 weekly chart performance for The Very Best of Cher
Chart (2008)	Peak position
US Billboard Catalog Albums	50

=== Year-end charts ===
2003 year-end chart performance for The Very Best of Cher
Chart (2003)	Peak position
Australian Albums (ARIA)	89
Danish Albums (Hitlisten)	89
Swedish Albums (Sverigetopplistan)	16
UK Albums (OCC)	127
US Billboard 200	28
US Billboard Internet Albums	8

2004 year-end chart performance for The Very Best of Cher
Chart (2004)	Peak position
UK Albums (OCC)	184

== Certifications and sales ==
Certifications and sales for The Very Best of Cher
Region	Certification	Certified units/sales
Australia (ARIA)	2× Platinum	140,000^{^}
Canada (Music Canada)	Platinum	100,000^{^}
Denmark (IFPI Danmark)	Gold	10,000^{‡}
South Africa (RISA)	Gold	25,000^{*}
Sweden (GLF)	Platinum	60,000^{^}
United Kingdom (BPI)	Gold	100,000^{^}
United States (RIAA)	3× Platinum	3,000,000^{‡}
^{*} Sales figures based on certification alone.^{^} Shipments figures based on certification alone.^{‡} Sales+streaming figures based on certification alone.

== Release history ==
Region	Date	Label	Format	Catalog
United States	April 1, 2003	Warner Bros.	CD	R2 73852
United States	August 26, 2003	Warner Bros.	2CD	R2 73956
Germany	August 29, 2003	Warner Music	2CD	25646 0864 2
Canada	September 1, 2003	Warner Bros.	2CD	WTVD 60864
Australia	September 2003	Warner Music	2CD	25646 0864 5
France	September 22, 2003	Warner Music	CD	50466 8588 2
United Kingdom	November 24, 2003	Warner Music	CD	50466 8586 2
Japan	January 21, 2004	Warner Music	2CD	WPCR-11751-2
