= Live! The Farewell Tour =

Live album by Cher
- Released: August 26, 2003
- Recorded: November 8, 2002
- Venues: American Airlines Arena in Miami, Florida
- Genres: Pop rock; dance-pop
- Length: 1:07:24
- Label: Warner Bros.
- Producers: Cher; Roger Davies; Lindsay Scott

Cher chronology
The Very Best of Cher (2003)	Live! The Farewell Tour (2003)	Gold (2005)

Professional ratings
Review scores
Source	Rating
AllMusic	2/5 stars
Rolling Stone	2/5 stars

Live! The Farewell Tour is a live album by Cher. The album was recorded at the American Airlines Arena in Miami, Florida, United States on a show from her Living Proof: The Farewell Tour.

== Album information ==
Packed with 18 hits, the album debuted at a peak of 40 on the Billboard 200. The same performance is available as the DVD The Farewell Tour which was recorded live in Miami. The album was also included in the special Edition of The Very Best of Cher. As of January 2006, the album has sold 200,000 copies in the US. The 18-track original album and the DVD-exclusive bonus tracks ("Save Up All Your Tears", "We All Sleep Alone", and "A Different Kind of Love Song") were remastered and released digitally and on streaming services on September 26, 2025. The album was also released on vinyl for the first time on the same date as a two-LP set pressed on hot pink and purple vinyl.

== Track listing ==
No.	Title	Writer(s)	Length
1.	"I Still Haven't Found What I'm Looking For"	Adam Clayton, The Edge, Bono, Larry Mullen Jr.	4:35
2.	"Song for the Lonely"	Mark Taylor, Paul Barry, Steve Torch	6:47
3.	"All or Nothing"	Taylor, Barry	3:58
4.	"I Found Someone"	Mark Mangold, Michael Bolton	3:36
5.	"Bang Bang (My Baby Shot Me Down)"	Sonny Bono	3:41
6.	"All I Really Want to Do"	Bob Dylan	2:01
7.	"Half-Breed"	Al Capps, Mary Dean	1:34
8.	"Gypsys, Tramps & Thieves"	Bob Stone	1:31
9.	"Dark Lady"	Johnny Durrell	1:13
10.	"Take Me Home"	Bob Esty, Michele Aller	3:48
11.	"The Way of Love"	Jacques Dieval, Al Stillman	2:34
12.	"After All"	Dean Pitchford, Tom Snow	3:54
13.	"Just Like Jesse James"	Desmond Child, Diane Warren	5:39
14.	"Heart of Stone"	Andy Hill, Peter Sinfield	4:09
15.	"The Shoop Shoop Song (It's in His Kiss)"	Rudy Clark	2:30
16.	"Strong Enough"	Taylor, Barry	3:01
17.	"If I Could Turn Back Time"	Warren	6:17
18.	"Believe"	Brian Higgins, Stuart McLennen, Barry, Torch, Matthew Gray, Timothy Powell, Cher (uncredited)	6:49

Notes

- "Believe" features writing contribution by Cher who remains uncredited.

== Personnel ==
- Executive Producers: Cher, Roger Davis, and Lindsay Scott
- Music Editor: John Van Nest
- Recorded: Paul Sandweiss and Dave Zeller
- Mastered: Dan Hersch and Bill Inglot
- Art Direction: Jeri Heiden and Hugh Brown
- Design: Jeri Heiden and Sara Cumings
- Live Photos: Frank Micelotta, David Leyes, and Barry King
- Product Manager: Mike Engstrom
- Project Assistance: David McLees, Steve Woolard, Maria McKenna, and Reggie Collins

== Charts ==
Chart (2003–05)	Peak position
Australian Albums (ARIA)	43
Austrian Albums (Ö3 Austria)	29
Belgian Albums (Ultratop Flanders)	82
German Albums (Offizielle Top 100)	50
Scottish Albums (Official Charts)	89
Swiss Albums (Schweizer Hitparade)	69
UK Albums (Official Charts)	79
US Billboard 200	40

== Release history ==
Region	Date	Label	Format	Catalogue
United States	August 26, 2003	Warner Bros. Records	CD	
Canada	August 26, 2003	Warner Bros. Records	CD	
Germany	June 1, 2004	WEA	CD	
United Kingdom	August 24, 2004	WEA	CD	8122-73953-2
France	August 24, 2004	WEA	CD	
United States	September 26, 2025	Warner Records	2×LP	9362-48313-5
