= Farewell Tour =

Farewell Tour may refer to:

- Farewell tour, a concert tour intended to signal the retirement of a singer or disbanding of a band
- Farewell Tour (album), by the Doobie Brothers, 1983
- Slayer Farewell Tour, 2018–2019
- The Farewell Tour, or Greatest Hits Tour (Westlife), by Westlife, 2012
- Living Proof: The Farewell Tour, by Cher, 2002–2005
  - The Farewell Tour (video), 2003
  - Live! The Farewell Tour, a 2003 live album
- Foreign Affair: The Farewell Tour, by Tina Turner, 1990
- Kiss Farewell Tour, 2000–2001
- Farewell Yellow Brick Road, by Elton John, 2018–2023
- End of the Road World Tour, by Kiss, 2019–2023
- La Última Vuelta World Tour, by Daddy Yankee, 2022
- John Cena Farewell Tour, John Cena's final WWE appearances before retiring from professional wrestling in 2025.
