= My Name (BoA album) =

Studio album by BoA
- Released: June 11, 2004
- Recorded: 2004
- Studio: SM Studios (Seoul)
- Genre: K-pop
- Length: 51:31
- Language: Korean
- Label: SM

BoA chronology
K-pop Selection (2004)	My Name (2004)	Best of Soul (2005)

Singles from My Name
- 1. "My Name" Released: June 11, 2004; 2. "Spark" Released: June 11, 2004

Music video
- "My Name" on YouTube "My Prayer" on YouTube

My Name is the fourth Korean-language studio album (seventh overall) by South Korean recording artist BoA, released through SM Entertainment on June 11, 2004. BoA promoted the album with the singles "My Name" and "Spark", the latter of which is a Korean-language cover of "Keep My Cool" (2002) by Luis Fonsi. The album saw BoA's transition into a more mature image in comparison to her previous records.

Commercially, My Name debuted at number one on the monthly MIAK album chart for June 2004, and was the 11th best-selling album of the year in South Korea with sales of 192,000 copies. Her first foray into the Chinese market, the overseas version of the album was released on August 12, 2004, and includes remakes of two of her songs in Chinese and an alternative cover. At the 2004 Mnet KM Music Video Festival, "My Name" won the Music Video of the Year award.

== Composition ==
The album's title track, "My Name", is a dance song with urban influences and was regarded by observers as BoA's transition into more mature concept. The following single, "Spark," is a Korean-language cover of Luis Fonsi's "Keep My Cool" from his album Fight the Feeling (2002), and likewise showcased BoA sporting a more masculine concept. In September 2004, BoA released a music video for the ballad track "My Prayer"; it consists of snippets of BoA's life as a trainee in addition to behind-the-scenes footage of her promoting her previous albums.

The last song of the album, "We", is a ballad that incorporates Korean traditional music instrumentations from the daegeum, sogeum, and haegeum. It was used as the ending song for the Japanese version of the movie Taegeukgi, which was released earlier that year in February.

== Critical reception ==
Lee Min-hee from IZM praised the album, writing that the record showcased BoA growing "into a more sensual and sophisticated woman", at the same maintaining her originality while exploring new sounds and musical styles. Lee added that although BoA was only 17 at the time, she possessed the "maturity and energy of an adult artist".

== Commercial performance ==
Commercially, My Name achieved success in South Korea, peaking at number one on the MIAK monthly albums chart for June 2004, and sold over 201,000 copies by mid-2005. It placed number seven for highest sales of the year. The album was further released in Japan on March 26, 2008; however, it failed to chart on the Oricon Top 100.

== Accolades ==
Awards and nominations for "My Name"
Year	Award-giving body	Category	Result	Ref.
2004	Mnet KM Music Video Festival	Music Video of the Year (Daesang)	Won	
2004	Mnet KM Music Video Festival	Best Female Video	Nominated	
2004	Mnet KM Music Video Festival	Best Dance Video	Nominated	
2005	Korean Music Awards	Best Female Artist	Nominated	

Music program awards
Song	Program	Date
"My Name"	Inkigayo	July 4, 2004
"My Name"	Inkigayo	July 11, 2004
"My Name"	Inkigayo	July 18, 2004
"My Name"	M Countdown	July 29, 2004
"Spark"	Inkigayo	September 12, 2004
"Spark"	Inkigayo	September 19, 2004

== Track listing ==
My Name – Standard edition
No.	Title	Lyrics	Music	Arrangement	Length
1.	"My Name"	Kenzie	Kenzie	Kenzie	3:12
2.	"Spark"	Hong Ji-yoo	Johan Aberg; Sigurd Rosnes; Rich Allan; Clyde Lieberman	Ahn Ik-soo; Lee Sang-geun	3:16
3.	"I Got U"	Yang Jae-sun	Stevie Bensusan; Claudio Cueni	Claudio Cueni	3:30
4.	"My Prayer" (기도)	Young-hu Kim	William Pyon; Young-hu Kim	William Pyon; Young-hu Kim	4:23
5.	"One Wings - Embracing Each Other" (완전한 날개)	Yoo Young-jin	Yoo Young-jin	Yoo Young-jin	3:29
6.	"Pit-a-Pat" (두근두근)	Park Chang-hyun	Park Chang-hyun	Park Chang-hyun	4:18
7.	"I Kiss"	Kenzie	Kenzie	Kenzie	3:18
8.	"Don't Give a Damn" (상관없어)	Yoon Jung	Svein Finneide; Jens Thoresen; Maria Storeng	Ahn Ik-soo; Jeon Bong-seok	3:03
9.	"Maybe... Maybe Not!?" (그럴 수 있겠지...!?)	Park Chang-hak	Yoon Sang	Yoon Sang	3:23
10.	"Etude"	Hwang Sung-jae	Hwang Sung-jae	Hwang Sung-jae	3:18
11.	"Good-Bye" (인사)	Park Chang-hyun	Park Chang-hyun	Park Chang-hyun	4:25
12.	"Feel Me"	Yoon Hyo-sang	Damon Sharpe; Lindy Robbins; Beau Dozier	Damon Sharpe; Beau Dozier	3:14
13.	"Stay in Love" (바보같죠)	Ha Jung-ho	Ha Jung-ho	Ha Jung-ho	4:17
14.	"We" (우리) (Theme from Taegukgi) (bonus track)	Kim Tae-yoon; Kang Je-gyu	Lee Dong-june	Lee Dong-june	4:45
Total length:					51:51

My Name – Chinese edition
No.	Title	Length
15.	"My Name" (Chinese version)
16.	"My Prayer" (Chinese version)

My Name – Japanese edition (DVD)
No.	Title	Length
1.	"My Name" (music video)
2.	"My Prayer" (music video)

== Credits and personnel ==
Credits adapted from the album's liner notes.

Studio

- SM Yellow Tail Studio – recording (track 1–4, 6–10, 12–13), mixing (track 4)
- Non Stop Media – recording (track 1–2, 7–14)
- T-Studio – recording (track 1–2, 11–12), strings recording (track 5)
- SM Booming System – recording, mixing (track 5)
- Dream Factory – recording, mixing (track 10)
- Vibe Studio – recording, mixing (track 14)
- SM Blue Cup Studio – mixing (track 1–3, 6–7, 9, 11, 13)
- SM Digital Recording Studio – mixing (track 2, 8, 12)
- Sonic Korea – mastering (all tracks)

Personnel

- SM Entertainment – executive producer
- Lee Soo-man – producer
- BoA – vocals (all tracks), background vocals (track 1–3, 9–10)
- Kenzie – producer, lyrics, composition, arrangement (track 1, 7), strings arrangement (track 1), background vocals (track 7), vocal directing (track 9)
- Hong Ji-yoo – lyrics (track 2)
- Johan Aberg – composition (track 2)
- Sigurd Rosnes – composition (track 2)
- Rich Allan – composition (track 2)
- Clyde Lieberman – composition (track 2)
- Ahn Ik-soo – producer, arrangement (track 2, 8)
- Lee Sang-geun – producer, arrangement (track 2)
- Yang Jae-sun – lyrics (track 3)
- Stevie Bensusan – producer, composition, arrangement (track 3)
- Claudio Cueni – producer, composition, arrangement (track 3)
- Young-hu Kim – producer, lyrics, composition, arrangement (track 4)
- William Pyon – producer, composition, arrangement (track 4)
- Yoo Young-jin – producer, lyrics, composition, arrangement, vocal directing, background vocals, recording, mixing (track 5)
- Park Chang-hyun – producer, lyrics, composition, arrangement, recording (track 6, 11), synthesizer (track 6), background vocals, piano, rhythm (track 11)
- Svein Finneide – composition (track 8)
- Jens Thoresen – composition (track 8)
- Maria Storeng – composition (track 8)
- Jeon Bong-seok – producer, arrangement (track 8)
- Park Chang-hak – lyrics (track 9)
- Yoon Sang – producer, composition, arrangement, synthesizer, programming (track 9)
- Hwang Sung-jae – producer, lyrics, composition, arrangement, strings arrangement, background vocals, programming, sound designer (track 10)
- Yoon Hyo-sang – lyrics (track 12)
- Damon Sharpe – producer, composition, arrangement (track 12)
- Lindy Robbins – composition (track 12)
- Beau Dozier – producer, composition, arrangement (track 12)
- Ha Jung-ho – producer, lyrics, composition, arrangement, background vocals (track 13)
- Kim Tae-yoon – lyrics (track 14)
- Kang Je-gyu – lyrics (track 14)
- Lee Dong-june – producer, composition, arrangement, synthesizer (track 14)
- Kim Hyun-ah – vocal directing (track 3–4, 12), background vocals (track 1–3, 5, 7–10, 12, 14)
- Erika – background vocals (track 3)
- Cindy Lee – background vocals (track 4)
- Ahn Shin-ae – background vocals (track 6, 11)
- Park Chae-won – background vocals (track 13)
- Kim Jung-bae – guitar (track 1, 7)
- Park In-young – strings arrangement (track 1, 13)
- K-Strings – strings (track 1–2, 5, 10–11, 13)
- Lee Tae-yoon – bass (track 2, 11)
- Sam Lee – guitar (track 2, 8)
- Jung Yeon-sil – haegum (track 2)
- Song Kwang-sik – strings arrangement (track 2)
- Michael "Fish" Herring – guitar (track 3–4)
- Na Won-joo – strings arrangement (track 5, 11)
- Choi Won-hyuk – bass (track 7, 13)
- Shin Hyun-kwon – bass (track 10)
- Hong Jun-ho – guitar (track 10, 13)
- Lee Sung-ryeol – guitar (track 11)
- Jang Se-won – piano (track 13)
- Ko Nam-soo – co-rhythm programming (track 13)
- Lee Geun-hyung – guitar (track 14)
- Han Chung-eun – daegeum (track 14)
- Kang Eun-won – haegum (track 14)
- Heo Hyun – soprano vocals (track 14)
- Yeo Doo-hyun – recording (track 1–4, 8), mixing (track 1–4, 6–7, 9, 11)
- Choi Kyung-sub – recording (track 1–2, 7–14)
- Kim Dong-hoon – recording (track 1–2, 11–12), strings recording (track 5)
- Park Dong-won – recording (track 2, 11)
- Lee Seong-ho – recording (track 3–4, 6–9, 12–13), mixing (track 4)
- Jang Ji-bok – recording (track 10)
- Kwak Jung-shin – recording, mixing (track 14)
- Lee Min-sook – recording assistant (track 1, 12), strings recording assistant (track 5)
- Hyun Eun-ho – recording assistant (track 2, 8–14)
- Heo Jeong-hoe a.k.a. KAT – mixing (track 2, 8, 12–13)
- Kim Han-koo – mixing (track 10)
- Jeon Hoon – mastering (all tracks)

== Charts ==
=== Weekly charts ===
Chart (2004)	Peak position
Singaporean Albums (RIAS)	7

=== Monthly charts ===
Chart (2004)	Peak position
South Korean Albums (RIAK)	1

=== Yearly charts ===
Chart (2004)	Position
South Korean Albums (RIAK)	11

== Sales ==
Sales for My Name
Region	Sales amount
Japan	3,000
South Korea	201,533

== Release history ==
Country	Date	Formats	Label
South Korea	June 11, 2004	CD; digital download	SM Entertainment
China	August 12, 2004	CD; double CD; HDCD	EMI Music; Avex Marketing
Taiwan	August 12, 2004	CD; double CD; HDCD	EMI Music; Avex Marketing
Japan	March 26, 2008	CD & DVD	Avex Inc.
