= Alive Again (Cher song) =

Single by Cher

from the album Living Proof
- B-side: "When You Walk Away"
- Released: June 11, 2002
- Recorded: 2001
- Studio: Modena One, Mothership Studios (England and in Los Angeles)
- Genre: Trance; dance-pop; house
- Length: 4:19 (album version); 3:31 (edit)
- Label: WEA
- Songwriters: Nick Bracegirdle; Ray Hedges; Tracy Ackerman
- Producers: Nick Bracegirdle; Ray Hedges

Cher singles chronology
"Song for the Lonely" (2002)	"Alive Again" (2002)	"A Different Kind of Love Song" (2002)

Licensed audio
- "Alive Again" on YouTube

"Alive Again" is a song performed by American singer-actress Cher from her twenty-fourth studio album, Living Proof (2001). It was released as a third and final European single from the album on June 11, 2002 by WEA; it was not released as a single in North America. The song has never been performed live. "Alive Again" received positive reviews from music critics, but its commercial response in Europe was limited. It managed to chart in Germany and Switzerland.

== Background ==
"Alive Again" was written by Nick Bracegirdle, Ray Hedges and Tracy Ackerman, with production by Bracegirdle and Hedges. The song was featured on Cher's album Living Proof (2001) and on international editions of The Very Best of Cher (2003). Sal Cinquemani from Slant Magazine described the song as a "trance anthem."

ARD, Germany's public broadcaster, selected "Alive Again" as the theme for their coverage of the 2002 Winter Olympics in Salt Lake City. In 2009, American fashion retailer Abercrombie & Fitch included the song in their Spring 2009 playlist.

== Release history ==
"Alive Again" was released exclusively throughout Europe, but the song failed to pick up the attention that "The Music's No Good Without You" received. The single in part suffered from a lack of promotion. In early 2002 Cher had complications with her record company which affected the further promotion for the single, because of this the future plans to release "Song for the Lonely" and "A Different Kind of Love Song" as European singles were dropped. Although "The Music's No Good Without You" was previously released as a club single in the United States, "Alive Again" remains unreleased in North America.

== Chart performance ==
The song entered the German singles chart where it became a top-forty hit. The song also entered both the Swiss and Romanian charts, charting at eighty and fifty-eight.

== Music video ==
Cher in the music video for "Alive Again"

In 2002, the video for "Alive Again" was shot and was later released in Europe only. The video features Cher in a blue room singing the song while appearing in many different colored wigs.

The footage used for the video was originally intended to be used in an advertisement to promote Living Proof. Some additional scenes from the video shoot are featured on the Dan-O-Rama Screen Projection for Cher's Living Proof: The Farewell Tour intro video and also during the 'Quote Attack' segment on the Tour DVD. When It was decided that "Alive Again" would be released in Germany a video was made using this footage. This is why Cher does not lip-sync the first verse and only sings while wearing the red wig.

Unreleased footage has Cher lip-syncing to others songs on the album - During one shot in the video Cher is seen singing in a blonde, shaggy wig. This is actually to another album track.

== Charts ==
Chart (2002)	Peak position
Czech Republic (IFPI)	21
Germany (Official German Charts)	27
Romania (Romanian Top 100)	58
Switzerland (Schweizer Hitparade)	80

== Release history ==
Release dates and formats for "Alive Again"
Region	Date	Format(s)	Label(s)	Ref(s).
Germany	March 4, 2002	CD single	WEA	
United Kingdom	June 11, 2002	CD single	WEA	
