= Living Proof (Cher album) =

Studio album by Cher
- Released: November 6, 2001
- Recorded: 2000–2001
- Studios: 143 Studios (Los Angeles, California); Eclectic (Stockholm, Sweden); Fredonia International Studios (Los Angeles, California); Metrophonic Studios (England); Modena One Studios (England); Sound Barrier Studios (New York); Stargate Studios (Norway)
- Genres: Dance-pop; disco; house; electronic
- Length: 50:17 (international version); 49:05 (American version)
- Labels: WEA; Warner Bros.
- Producers: Johan Åberg; Nigel Butler; Chapman; Chris Cox; Anders Hansson; Tony Moran; Bruce Roberts; Wayne Rodriguez; Stargate; Chicane; Ray Hedges; Mark Taylor

Cher chronology
Not Commercial (2000)	Living Proof (2001)	The Very Best of Cher (2003)

Singles from Living Proof
- 1. "The Music's No Good Without You" Released: November 5, 2001; 2. "Song for the Lonely" Released: March 19, 2002; 3. "Alive Again" Released: June 11, 2002; 4. "A Different Kind of Love Song" Released: August 13, 2002; 5. "When the Money's Gone"/"Love One Another" Released: February 4, 2003

Living Proof is the twenty-fourth studio album by American singer Cher. It was first released on November 6, 2001, by WEA and distributed in North America by Warner Bros. Records in 2002. After the commercial success of Believe (1998), Cher began work on her twenty-fourth studio album in 2000. Rob Dickins was chosen as the executive producer for the album, enlisting producers such as Johan Åberg, Chris Cox, Tony Moran, Bruce Roberts, Wayne Rodriguez, Stargate, Chicane, Ray Hedges, and Mark Taylor. Its music incorporates dance-pop, disco and house styles.

Upon release, Living Proof received mixed reviews from music critics. Some of them praised the album itself, saying that it was even better than Believe, while others criticized the excessive use of Auto-Tune on Cher's vocals. Commercially, the album did not reach the same success as its predecessor, debuting at number nine on the US Billboard 200 with first-week sales of 82,000 copies. It was received moderately in Europe, peaking within the top 30 in Sweden and the top 50 in the United Kingdom, and was certified gold by both Swedish Recording Industry Association (GLF) and British Phonographic Industry (BPI). Living Proof is estimated to have sold more than one million copies worldwide.

Six singles were released from Living Proof. "The Music's No Good Without You" was released as the album's worldwide lead single, and made Cher one of the few artists to have a top 10 hit in the United Kingdom in five consecutive decades. The American lead single "Song for the Lonely" reached number one on the US Dance Club Songs chart. The following singles, "Alive Again", "A Different Kind of Love Song", "When the Money's Gone" and "Love One Another", failed to make much impact on the charts. To further promote the album, Cher made promotional television appearances and embarked on the Living Proof: The Farewell Tour, becoming the longest-running concert tour ever in North America and one of the highest-grossing tours by a solo artist, earning an estimated US$250 million.

On March 9, 2024, it was announced by Dion Singer via Instagram that Living Proof would be released on vinyl for the first time on June 28, 2024. It was also announced that the Japanese only track "The Look" and the European only track "You Take It All" would be included on the deluxe edition of the album released on the same day.

== Background ==
After the commercial success of Believe (1998), Cher released her twenty-third studio album Not Commercial in late 2000. It was sold exclusively online and had a "not commercial" sound, hence she did not consider it an "official" follow-up to Believe. The singer began work on her 24th studio album in 2000. She began giving hints of the album at the time, calling it the "son of Believe" because "that's how I differentiate it in my mind", and elaborated that "If you liked Believe, you're going to love the new one, because the new one is so much fun", calling it "so terrific". Cher commented about one of the songs she was considering for the album while recording it, saying she "almost killed" herself while she was dancing in the shower.

For the album, Cher collaborated with several musicians including Stargate, Chicane and previous collaborator Mark Taylor. She said she felt lucky for having a chance to have "great songs and great producers" for the album. Cher said her favorite song slated for the album was a cover version of "When the Money's Gone" (1995), written by Bruce Roberts, stating it was "so perfect" for her. "It's about this person who's [asking her lover], 'If I lose all my money, will you still love me if we have to eat fast food out of a beat up car?'. It's so dance. It's so gay. It's so good", she said. The album cover, photographed by Michael Lavine, was revealed through Cher's official website on October 8, 2001. It depicts Cher wearing a "flowing" blond wig in contrast to her all-black, medieval-like outfit. The Dallas Morning News commented that "even with a pensive look on her exquisitely snipped and tucked face, she commands attention".

== Music and lyrics ==
The international version for Living Proof opens with "The Music's No Good Without You", a disco-inspired song filled with "hypnotic synth lines", while Cher's vocals are manipulated with Auto-Tune which made her sound like the "embodiment of a haunted extra-terrestrial". The following track "Alive Again" is described as a "trance anthem", and its lyrics revolve around Cher singing about the "broken world of a dissolved relationship". "I only wanna learn to feel the rain/Then maybe I could stop the leaves from falling/I only wanna learn to freeze the flame/I know I'll be alive again", she sings in the chorus. The third song "Song for the Lonely" lyrically "evokes September 11", and addresses subjects such as heroism, longing, bravery and perseverance over a disco beat. Musically, it abandons electronic instruments in favor of a more pure and impassioned performance. The following track, "A Different Kind of Love Song" lyrically alludes to themes of tragedy, heroism and brotherhood, while musically it has "cloud-scrapping chorus, breezy melody, and a kitschy production tics", including Cher's heavily processed vocals by Auto-Tune.

The fifth song "Rain, Rain" is a "dressed-down" track with "electronic gurgles and aquatic vocal renderings", in which "listeners get a glimmer of Cher's husky vocals". Next song is "Love So High", which "blends futuristic keyboards with earthy acoustic guitars". The seventh track on the international version, "Body to Body, Heart to Heart", is a Spanish-influenced song penned by Diane Warren. The eighth song, "Love Is a Lonely Place Without You", lyrically carries the theme of a "brokenhearted symbol of a strong but decidedly single woman". The following track, "Real Love", features "computer-altered vocals adding a futuristic feel" to it. The tenth track "Love One Another" is an "anthemic" and "heartfelt rendition" of a song originally by singer Amber. The 11th song on the international version of the album, "You Take It All", is an "alpine breakbeat number", while the track that replaces it on the American version is "When You Walk Away", another track penned by Warren. The closing song, a cover of Bruce Roberts's "When the Money's Gone", is an "airy track" which has "rapid-fire drum beats".

== Promotion ==
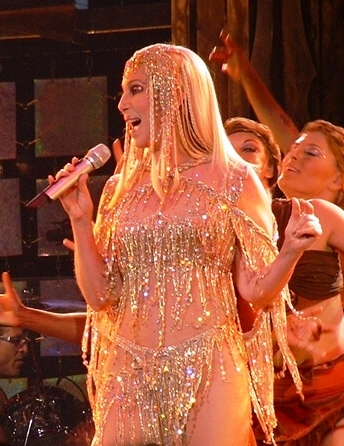
Cher performing during her Living Proof: The Farewell Tour in 2004

To start marketing Living Proof, Cher made an appearance on German TV show Wetten, dass..? on October 13, 2001, and performed "The Music's No Good Without You". It was followed by performances of the song on occasions such as Top of the Pops, Children in Need, Parkinson, Royal Variety Performance, Sen kväll med Luuk, Bambi Awards, Premios Ondas, among others. BBC One aired a documentary titled Still Cher on January 3, 2002, which followed Cher as she toured Europe promoting Living Proof in 2001. Cher made a number of performances to promote the album's release in the United States. She opened the 2002 American Music Awards on January 9, 2002 singing "Song for the Lonely", accompanied by dancers and wearing a blonde wig. She also appeared on The Rosie O'Donnell Show, The Tonight Show with Jay Leno, The Oprah Winfrey Show, Late Show with David Letterman, and VH1 Divas promoting the song. Cher also sang "A Different Kind of Love Song" on the comedy series Will & Grace in 2002, where she made a special guest appearance in the episode, "AI: Artificial Insemination Part 2", as God. The single was also performed during the 50th American Bandstand.

Cher embarked on her fifth concert tour titled Living Proof: The Farewell Tour in June 2002 in Toronto. It was originally planned as a 59-date tour in North America, but due to the popularity of the tour, Cher extended it a number of times to play in territories she either had never been to or had not played for a long time. The tour gave Cher the opportunity to perform in new territories, including her first tour to reach New Zealand. According to the Dakota Student, the performance at the Alerus Center, in Grand Forks, North Dakota was the largest single night audience the artist has performed for during her solo career. The final show took place in Los Angeles in April 2005 after a record-breaking 325 dates. The Living Proof: The Farewell Tour was a critical and commercial success. It became the longest running concert tour ever in North America and the highest-grossing tour by a solo artist, earning an estimated $250 million from 325 shows. The concert played at American Airlines Arena in Miami, Florida, in November 2002, was broadcast on NBC in February 2003. It attracted near 17 million viewers and won three Primetime Emmy Awards. The show was included on a DVD titled The Farewell Tour which was released in 2003.

== Singles ==
"The Music's No Good Without You" was released as the album's lead single worldwide in November 2001, except for the United States, where it was released later in 2002. It was a success in the United Kingdom, reaching number eight on the UK Singles Chart, while Cher achieved the feat of having a top 10 hit in five consecutive decades there. The song managed to become a top 10 hit in Canada, (Note: The Canadian Hot 100 is depicted on Billboard as Canadian Digital Song Sales.) and Italy. The American lead single, "Song for the Lonely", was released in March 2002 and peaked at number 85 on the US Billboard Hot 100 and number one on the Dance Club Songs chart. It also reached the top twenty in Canada, and the top forty in Romania.

"Alive Again" was released as the third and final European single from Living Proof. Its commercial response was limited and quite poor in European countries, managing to chart in Germany at number 27, and Switzerland at number 80. "A Different Kind of Love Song", the second American single, topped the Dance Club Songs and peaked at number 30 on the Adult Contemporary chart. The third and final American singles were "When the Money's Gone"/"Love One Another". Although "When the Money's Gone" topped the Dance Club Songs chart, the former did not chart at all.

== Critical reception ==
Professional ratings
Review scores
Source	Rating
AllMusic	2.5/5 stars
The Dallas Morning News	C
Dotmusic	4/10 stars
Entertainment Weekly	B+
entertainment.ie	2/5 stars
New York Post	1.5/4 stars
Rolling Stone	3/5 stars
Slant Magazine	3.5/5 stars
Q	2/5 stars

Living Proof received generally mixed reviews from music critics. Michael Paoletta from Billboard was positive, stating that after a few listens, the record shows it is actually better than its predecessor Believe. In a similar review, Post-Tribune newspaper felt the album "should show just how essential Cher still is in the world of pop". Baby A. Gil, writer for The Philippine Star, praised the album as "another rousing dancefest", while noting that Cher's singing was "in full control and in better form than it was during her early days", calling it an "excellent example" that time can stand still. Sal Cinquemani from Slant Magazine was mostly positive, noting that "each track pumps with melodies so thickly contagious that their hit potentials are essentially guaranteed", while even the album's weakest moments maintain the high-energy, club-ready pace. However, he also noted that Cher "shamelessly revisits her proven hit formula with such fervent immodesty it's hard to believe three years have gone by". Entertainment Weekly's Jim Farber gave a positive feedback, despite saying Cher's vocals seemed "even more worked on than her face. But she still has feeling". Colm O'Hare from Irish magazine Hot Press exalted the album's international lead single "The Music's No Good Without You", noting it uses the same voice effect from "Believe", and said "it's almost a 'Believe' Part Two proving that nothing succeeds like repetition".

Barry Walters from Rolling Stone gave a mixed review, saying that Living Proof "endeavors to make lightning strike twice in the same place. [...] Unlike house music or modern R&B, Cher's twenty-first-century disco is built on fully fleshed songs and detailed arrangements, and the studio wizardry is even grander than before", but also felt that it "lacks its predecessor's unexpected impact". AllMusic's Kerry L. Smith called it a "peppy dance album that spouts warm sentiments and reverberating sounds to keep you going all night long", however noted that the power of the album's punch loses its luster when the Auto-Tune transforms Cher's "deep, sexy voice" into a "canned electronic robot dialect". Josh Regan from Dotmusic gave the album four out of 10 stars, stating that Cher's voice was "as strong and distinctive as ever" on the album, but "the uptempo easy listening production courtesy of the likes of Chicane and Stargate means that this one is strictly for the mums and dads". The Dallas Morning News gave the album a C grade, saying Living Proof set itself up for failure by "shamelessly" copying and then overdoing the formula that made its predecessor artistically and commercially contagious. The review finished saying that it was "Believe II sans the imagination, the free-spirited pizzazz that made the former work so well". The album earned Cher a nomination on the Best Dance Recording category for "Love One Another" on the 46th Grammy Awards. However, she lost the award to Kylie Minogue's song "Come into My World".

== Commercial performance ==
In the United Kingdom, Living Proof debuted at number 46 on the UK Albums Chart for the week ending December 2, 2001, and remained for three weeks on the chart. The album was certified Gold on November 23, 2001, by the British Phonographic Industry (BPI), for shipments of 100,000 copies. It became her eighth consecutive album to be certified at least Gold in the United Kingdom. In Austria, Living Proof debuted and peaked at number 19, remaining on the albums chart for only five weeks. In France, it peaked at number 53 on the albums chart, during the week dated November 24, 2001. Living Proof fared considerably better, debuting at its peak of number 13, on the German Albums Chart, on December 3, 2001. After spending 11 weeks on the chart, the album was certified Gold by the Bundesverband Musikindustrie (BVMI), for shipments of 150,000 units. In Australia, Living Proof debuted at number 68 on the ARIA Charts, on the issue dated December 3, 2001. In New Zealand, the album debuted at number 26 and spending only a week inside the New Zealand Albums Chart.

In the United States, Living Proof debuted at number nine on the Billboard 200 albums chart, with first-week sales of 82,000 copies on the issue dated March 16, 2002. It became the highest-debuting album of her career, and her third-highest-charting album at the time. The album remained for 21 weeks inside the chart, considerably less than its predecessor Believe, which spent 79 weeks inside the Billboard 200. It was eventually certified Gold by the Recording Industry Association of America (RIAA) for shipments of more than 500,000 units within the country. Living Proof has sold 520,000 copies in the United States as of December 2012, according to Nielsen SoundScan. In Canada, the album entered the albums chart at number 64 for the week ending December 2, 2001. As of December 2012, Living Proof has sold more than one million copies worldwide.

During the week of July 7, 2024, Living Proof re-entered the Scottish albums chart at number 72. It also re-entered at number 50 on the physical albums chart, debuted at number 59 on the album sales chart, and debuted at number 21 on the vinyl albums chart.

== Track listing ==
Living Proof – International edition
No.	Title	Writer(s)	Producer(s)	Length
1.	"The Music's No Good Without You"	Cher; James Thomas; Mark Taylor; Paul Barry	M. Taylor; Thomas; Jeff Taylor	4:40
2.	"Alive Again"	Nicholas Bracegirdle; Ray Hedges; Tracy Ackerman	Chicane; Hedges	4:18
3.	"(This is) A Song for the Lonely"	M. Taylor; Barry; Steve Torch	M. Taylor	4:01
4.	"A Different Kind of Love Song"	Johan Åberg; Michelle Lewis; Sigurd Rosnes	Åberg; Anders Hansson	3:50
5.	"Rain, Rain"	Shelly Peiken; Guy Roche	Stargate	3:43
6.	"Love So High"	John Capek; Marc Jordan	Bruce Roberts; Wallis and Chapman	4:32
7.	"Body to Body, Heart to Heart"	Diane Warren	Tony Moran	3:59
8.	"Love Is a Lonely Place Without You"	M. Taylor; Barry; Torch	M. Taylor	3:53
9.	"Real Love"	Cher; Tor Hermansen; Mikkel Eriksen; Hallgeir Rustan	Stargate	3:55
10.	"Love One Another"	William Steinberg; Marie-Claire Cremers; Rick Nowels	Nowels; Wayne Rodrigues; Chris Cox	3:45
11.	"You Take It All"	Stuart McLennan; Bracegirdle; Brian Higgins	Chicane; Higgins	4:53
12.	"When the Money's Gone"	Roberts; Donna Weiss	Roberts	4:38
Total length:				50:17

Living Proof – Japanese edition (bonus track)
No.	Title	Writer(s)	Producer(s)	Length
13.	"The Look"	M. Taylor; Barry	M. Taylor	4:25
Total length:				54:42

Living Proof – American edition
No.	Title	Writer(s)	Producer(s)	Length
1.	"Song for the Lonely"	M. Taylor; Barry; Torch	M. Taylor	3:21
2.	"A Different Kind of Love Song"	Åberg; Lewis; Rosnes	Åberg; Hansson	3:31
3.	"Alive Again"	Bracegirdle; Hedges; Ackerman	Chicane; Hedges	4:18
4.	"The Music's No Good Without You"	Cher; Thomas; M. Taylor; Barry	M. Taylor; Thomas; Taylor	4:40
5.	"Rain, Rain"	Peiken; Roche	Stargate	3:43
6.	"Real Love"	Cher; Hermansen; Eriksen; Rustan	Stargate	3:55
7.	"Love So High"	Capek; Jordan	Roberts; Wallis and Chapman	4:32
8.	"Body to Body, Heart to Heart"	Warren	Moran	3:59
9.	"Love Is a Lonely Place Without You"	M. Taylor; Barry; Torch	M. Taylor	3:53
10.	"Love One Another"	Steinberg; Cremers; Nowels	Nowels; Rodrigues; Cox	3:45
11.	"When You Walk Away"	Warren	M. Taylor	4:21
12.	"When the Money's Gone"	Roberts; Weiss	Roberts	4:38
Total length:				48:41

Living Proof – 2024 remastered digital deluxe edition (bonus tracks)
No.	Title	Writer(s)	Producer(s)	Length
13.	"The Look"	M. Taylor; Barry	M. Taylor	4:25
14.	"You Take It All"	Bracegirdle; Higgins; McLennan	Higgins; Chicane	4:53
Total length:				57:59

== Personnel ==
- Cher – main vocals, songwriter
- Tracy Ackerman – backing vocalist
- Clark Anderson – backing vocalist
- Sue Ann Carwell – backing vocalist
- Rob Dickins – producer
- Chapman – producer
- James Thomas – songwriter
- Mark Taylor – songwriter, producer
- Paul Barry – songwriter
- Ray Hedges – songwriter
- Tracy Ackerman – songwriter
- Steve Torch – songwriter
- Johan Åberg – songwriter
- Michelle Lewis – songwriter
- Sigurd Rosnes – songwriter
- Shelly Peiken – songwriter
- Guy Roche – songwriter
- John Capek – songwriter
- Marc Jordan – songwriter
- Bruce Roberts – producer
- Wallis and Chapman – producers
- Diane Warren – songwriter
- William Steinberg – songwriter
- Marie-Claire Cremers – songwriter
- Rick Nowels – songwriter, producer
- Donna Weiss – songwriter
- Stuart McLennan – songwriter
- Brian Higgins – songwriter, producer
- Anders Hansson – producer
- Stargate – producer
- Tony Moran – producer
- Wayne Rodrigues – producer
- Chris Cox – producer
- Jeff Taylor – producer
- Stargate – songwriters, producers
- Eric Thorenburg – engineer
- Randy Wine – engineer
- Nick Bracegirdle – engineer, songwriter, producer
- Björn Engelmann – mixing
- Jeri Heiden – art direction
- Barrie Goshko – art direction
- Michael Lavine – photography
- Kevyn Aucoin – make-up
- Serena Radaeli – hair

== Charts ==
=== Weekly charts ===
Weekly chart performance for Living Proof
Chart (2001–2002)	Peak position
Australian Albums (ARIA)	68
Austrian Albums (Ö3 Austria)	19
Canadian Albums (Billboard)	64
Danish Albums (Hitlisten)	38
European Albums (Top 100)	28
French Albums (SNEP)	53
German Albums (Offizielle Top 100)	13
Greek Albums (IFPI Greece)	1
Hungarian Albums (MAHASZ)	11
Italian Albums (FIMI)	27
New Zealand Albums (RMNZ)	26
Polish Albums (ZPAV)	30
Scottish Albums (Official Charts)	51
Spanish Albums (PROMUSICAE)	17
Swedish Albums (Sverigetopplistan)	29
Swiss Albums (Schweizer Hitparade)	16
UK Albums (Official Charts)	46
US Billboard 200	9

Chart (2024)	Peak position
Croatian International Albums (HDU)	24

=== Year-end charts ===
Year-end chart performance for Living Proof
Chart (2002)	Position
US Billboard 200	196

== Certifications and sales ==
Certifications and sales for Living Proof
Region	Certification	Certified units/sales
Denmark (IFPI Danmark)	Gold	10,000^{‡}
Germany (BVMI)	Gold	150,000^{^}
Spain (Promusicae)	Platinum	100,000^{^}
Sweden (GLF)	Gold	40,000^{^}
Switzerland (IFPI Switzerland)	Gold	20,000^{^}
United Kingdom (BPI)	Gold	100,000^{^}
United States (RIAA)	Gold	520,000
Summaries
Worldwide	—	1,000,000
^{^} Shipments figures based on certification alone.^{‡} Sales+streaming figures based on certification alone.

== Release history ==
Release history and formats for Living Proof
Region	Date	Format(s)	Edition(s)	Label	Ref.
Japan	November 6, 2001	CD	Standard	WEA	
United Kingdom	November 19, 2001	CD; digital download; cassette	Standard	WEA	
France	November 20, 2001	CD; cassette	Standard	WEA	
Canada	November 27, 2001	CD; cassette	Standard	WEA	
United States	February 26, 2002	CD; digital download; cassette	Standard	Warner Bros.	

== Notes ==
- Larocque, Jason (2013). You Haven't Seen The Last of Me. Lulu. ISBN 978-1-300-88858-1.
