= List of Billboard number-one dance singles of 2002 =

Billboard magazine compiled the top-performing dance singles in the United States during 2002 on two Hot Dance Music charts: the Club Play and the Maxi-Singles Sales. Premiered in 1976, the Club Play chart ranked the most-played singles on dance club based on reports from a national sample of club DJs. The Maxi-Singles Sales chart was launched in 1985 to compile the best-selling dance singles based on retail sales across the United States.

== Charts history ==
Chart history
Issue date	Hot Dance Music/Club Play		Hot Dance Music/Maxi-Singles Sales		Ref.
Issue date	Song	Artist(s)	Song	Artist(s)	Ref.
January 5	"Come on Down"	Crystal Waters	"Freelove"	Depeche Mode	
January 12	"Guitarra G"	G Club presents Banda Sonora	"Where the Party At" (Remixes)	Jagged Edge With Nelly	
January 19	"Everyday"	Kim English	"Lifetime" (Ben Watt Remix)	Maxwell	
January 26	"Get the Party Started"	Pink	"Lifetime" (Ben Watt Remix)	Maxwell	
February 2	"Freelove"	Depeche Mode	"Lifetime" (Ben Watt Remix)	Maxwell	
February 9	"Can't Get You Out of My Head"	Kylie Minogue	"Lifetime" (Ben Watt Remix)	Maxwell	
February 16	"Caught Up"	DJ Disciple featuring Mia Cox	"Lifetime" (Ben Watt Remix)	Maxwell	
February 23	"You Got Me (Burnin' Up)"	Funky Green Dogs	"Lifetime" (Ben Watt Remix)	Maxwell	
March 2	"You Got Me (Burnin' Up)"	Funky Green Dogs	"Lifetime" (Ben Watt Remix)	Maxwell	
March 9	"Take My Hand"	Dido	"Lifetime" (Ben Watt Remix)	Maxwell	
March 16	"Love's Gonna Save the Day"	Georgie Porgie	"Lifetime" (Ben Watt Remix)	Maxwell	
March 23	"It's Love (Trippin')"	Goldtrix presents Andrea Brown	"No More Drama"	Mary J. Blige	
March 30	"It's Love (Trippin')"	Goldtrix presents Andrea Brown	"Thank You"	Dido	
April 6	"Song for the Lonely"	Cher	"Song for the Lonely"	Cher	
April 13	"No More Drama"	Mary J. Blige	"Song for the Lonely"	Cher	
April 20	"Wish I Didn't Miss You"	Angie Stone	"Song for the Lonely"	Cher	
April 27	"It's Gonna Be...(A Lovely Day)"	Brancaccio & Aisher	"Song for the Lonely"	Cher	
May 4	"Alive"	Kevin Aviance	"Song for the Lonely"	Cher	
May 11	"Can't Stop Dancin'"	Inaya Day	"Song for the Lonely"	Cher	
May 18	"Escape"	Enrique Iglesias	"Song for the Lonely"	Cher	
May 25	"They-Say Vision"	Res	"Song for the Lonely"	Cher	
June 1	"Soak Up the Sun"	Sheryl Crow	"Song for the Lonely"	Cher	
June 8	"Days Go By"	Dirty Vegas	"Song for the Lonely"	Cher	
June 15	"Hella Good"	No Doubt	"Song for the Lonely"	Cher	
June 22	"Point of View"	DB Boulevard	"Song for the Lonely"	Cher	
June 29	"One Day in Your Life"	Anastacia	"Heaven"	DJ Sammy & Yanou Featuring Do	
July 6	"Lazy"	X-Press 2	"Heaven"	DJ Sammy & Yanou Featuring Do	
July 13	"Blame"	Sono	"Heaven"	DJ Sammy & Yanou Featuring Do	
July 20	"Love at First Sight"	Kylie Minogue	"Heaven"	DJ Sammy & Yanou Featuring Do	
July 27	"The Need to Be Naked"	Amber	"Heaven"	DJ Sammy & Yanou Featuring Do	
August 3	"The Sound of Goodbye"	Perpetuous Dreamer	"Heaven"	DJ Sammy & Yanou Featuring Do	
August 10	"That Sound"	Rosabel	"Heaven"	DJ Sammy & Yanou Featuring Do	
August 17	"Shifter"	Timo Maas featuring MC Chickaboo	"Heaven"	DJ Sammy & Yanou Featuring Do	
August 24	"Treat Me Right"	Kim English	"Heaven"	DJ Sammy & Yanou Featuring Do	
August 31	"A Different Kind of Love Song"	Cher	"Alive" (Thunderpuss Remix)	Jennifer Lopez Featuring Nas	
September 7	"A Different Kind of Love Song"	Cher	"Alive" (Thunderpuss Remix)	Jennifer Lopez Featuring Nas	
September 14	"You Gotta Believe"	Fierce Ruling Diva	"Alive" (Thunderpuss Remix)	Jennifer Lopez Featuring Nas	
September 21	"Safe from Harm"	Narcotic Thrust featuring Yvonne John Lewis	"Alive" (Thunderpuss Remix)	Jennifer Lopez Featuring Nas	
September 28	"I Never Knew"	Gloria Gaynor	"Alive" (Thunderpuss Remix)	Jennifer Lopez Featuring Nas	
October 5	"Empires (Bring Me Men)"	Lamya	"Alive" (Thunderpuss Remix)	Jennifer Lopez Featuring Nas	
October 12	"Whatchulookinat"	Whitney Houston	"Alive" (Thunderpuss Remix)	Jennifer Lopez Featuring Nas	
October 19	"Addicted to Bass"	Puretone	"Alive" (Thunderpuss Remix)	Jennifer Lopez Featuring Nas	
October 26	"I Don't Want U"	Widelife	"Alive" (Thunderpuss Remix)	Jennifer Lopez Featuring Nas	
November 2	"Gotta Get Thru This"	Daniel Bedingfield	"Six Days"	DJ Shadow Featuring Mos Def	
November 9	"Serve the Ego"	Jewel	"Die Another Day" (Remixes)	Madonna	
November 16	"Insatiable"	Thick Dick featuring Latanza Waters	"Die Another Day" (Remixes)	Madonna	
November 23	"Irresistible!"	Superchumbo	"Die Another Day" (Remixes)	Madonna	
November 30	"Die Another Day"	Madonna	"Die Another Day" (Remixes)	Madonna	
December 7	"Die Another Day"	Madonna	"Die Another Day" (Remixes)	Madonna	
December 14	"Mr. Lonely"	Deborah Cox	"Die Another Day" (Remixes)	Madonna	
December 21	"The Sound of Violence"	Cassius featuring Steve Edwards	"Die Another Day" (Remixes)	Madonna	
December 28	"Dark Beat (Addicted 2 Drums)"	Oscar G and Ralph Falcón	"Die Another Day" (Remixes)	Madonna	

== See also ==
- 2002 in music
- List of Billboard Hot 100 number ones of 2002
