= Sigurd Heimdal Rosnes =

Norwegian songwriter and producer

Sigurd Heimdal Røsnes (” Ziggy”) is a Norwegian songwriter and producer. He has worked with artists such as Cher, Luis Fonsi, Cliff Richard, Ace of Base, BoA, Kumi Koda, Namie Amuro, E-Girls, L5, A-Teens, Ch!pz, Sharon Kips, and Suzie McNeil. Sigurd Røsnes scored a #1 on Billboard´s Hot Dance Music with Cher's "A Different Kind of Love Song".

== Partial discography ==
=== Cher ===
- "A Different Kind Of Love Song" (Michelle Lewis, Sigurd Røsnes, Johan Åberg) from the album Living Proof & The Very Best of Cher No#1 Billboard´s Hot Dance Music

=== Cliff Richard ===
- "Everything That I Am" (Tom Nichols, Sigurd Rösnes, Martin Sjølie) from the album Rise Up #4 UK Albums

=== Luis Fons] ===
- "Keep My Cool" ("Fuera de Control") (Sigurd Røsnes, Johan Åberg, Allan Rich, Clyde Lieberman) from the album Amor Secreto #1 Billboard Top Latin Albums

=== E-Girls ===
- "Pink Champagne" (Sigurd Røsnes, Nemin Harambasic, Courtney Woolsey, Stephen Stahl, Rie Fujioka, Dominique Rodriguez) #1 Oricon Singles Chart (2016)

=== Namie Amuro ===
- "Black Make-Up" (Sigurd Røsnes, Andreas Öberg, Xin Xin Gao) B-Side from the single "Red Carpet" #2 Oricon Chart Japan (2015) (Produced by Sigurd Rösnes)

=== Kumi Koda ===
- "Dance In the Rain" (Ziggy, Koda Kumi, Her0ism, Melanie Fontana) from the album Walk of My Life #1 Oricon Chart Japan (2015)

=== Nádine ===
- "Made Up My Mind" (Ziggy, Lindy Robbins, Manic) 1st single from the album This Time I Know

=== BoA ===
- "No. 1" (Ziggy) from the album No. 1
- "Spark2" (Sigurd Røsnes, Johan Åberg, Allan Rich, Clyde Lieberman) from the album 'My Name
- "Touch" (Røsnes, Manic, Djuström, Jonsson) from the album Summer SMTown

=== A-Teens ===
- "Rockin" (Røsnes, Pettersen, Eikemo) from the album Teen Spirit

=== L5 (band) ===
- "Toutes Les Femmes De Ta Vie" (Steinberg, Røsnes, Åberg, Maïdi Roth, Doriand) from the album L5
- "Plaisir Extensible" (Ziggy, Åberg, Sandén, Lydy Louisy Joseph) from the album Turbulences

=== Suzie McNeil ===
- "Broken & Beautiful" (Michelle Lewis, Sigurd Røsnes, Johan Åberg) from the album Broken & Beautiful

=== Joy Williams (singer) ===
- "Touch of Fatel (Ty Lacy, Sigurd Røsnes, Johan Åberg) from the album Joy Williams

=== Sharon Kips ===
- "Heartbreak Away" (Ziggy, Marjorie Maye, Nick Manic) 1st single from the album 10 #1 Holland Single Chart

=== Ch!pz ===
- "Captain Hook" (Røsnes, Jaxx, Manic) -3:14 from the album Adventures Of Ch!pz
- "Christmas Time Is Here" (Røsnes, T.Nichols, Manic) from the album Past:Present:Future
- "High School Love" (Røsnes, Jaxx, Manic) from the album Past:Present:Future
- "1929" (Røsnes, Manic) from the album Past:Present:Future
- "Rockstar" (Røsnes, Jaxx, Manic) -3:10 from the album The World Of Ch!pz
- "The Biggest Show On Earth" (Røsnes, Manic) from the album The H!ts Collection
