= Little Leviathan =

Studio album by Michelle Lewis
- Released: 1998
- Recorded: 1997/1998
- Genre: Pop/Rock
- Length: 52:22
- Label: Giant Records/Warner Bros.
- Producer: Steve Fisk, Michael Barbiero

Michelle Lewis chronology
| Little Leviathan (1998) | Letters Out Loud (2005) |

Professional ratings
Review scores
| Source | Rating |
|---|---|
| Allmusic | 3.0/5 stars |

Little Leviathan is an album by singer Michelle Lewis. The album was released in 1998, and the lead single "Nowhere and Everywhere" reached number #40 on the US Hot Adult Top 40 chart, and #21 on the Bubbling Under Hot 100 Singles chart. The album was produced by Steve Fisk.

== Track listing ==
| # | Title | Writer(s) | Length |
|---|---|---|---|
| 1. | "Nowhere and Everywhere" | Michelle Lewis, Wayne Cohen | 4:01 |
| 2. | "Homesick" | Michelle Lewis, Teddy Kumpel | 4:19 |
| 3. | "Loaded" | Michelle Lewis, Teddy Kumpel | 4:14 |
| 4. | "Outside" | Michelle Lewis | 5:05 |
| 5. | "January's Child" | Michelle Lewis, Teddy Kumpel | 3:53 |
| 6. | "Liquid Heart" | Michelle Lewis, Teddy Kumpel | 4:02 |
| 7. | "Mr. Marigold" | Michelle Lewis | 4:52 |
| 8. | "Ground Zero" | Michelle Lewis, Dana Kurtz, René Cologne | 3:53 |
| 9. | "Everyday Alien" | Michelle Lewis, Teddy Kumpel | 4:44 |
| 10. | "Storytellers" | Michelle Lewis, Teddy Kumpel | 3:00 |
| 11. | "Dig Me Out" | Michelle Lewis, Teddy Kumpel | 4:08 |
| 12. | "Poor Dead William" | Michelle Lewis | 5:00 |

== Credits ==
- Michael Barbiero – Producer, Mixing
- Jack Daley – Bass
- Andy Ezrin – Keyboards
- Ken Feldman – Assistant Engineer
- Steve Fisk – Producer, Loops
- Keith Golden – Bass
- John Goodmanson – Engineer, Mixing
- Warren Haynes – Guitar
- Femio Hernández – Mixing Assistant
- Ted Jensen – Mastering
- Teddy Kumpel – Guitar and Additional Production
- Dayna Kurtz – Background Vocals
- John Leventhal – Organ, Guitar, Piano, Background Vocals, Producer
- Michelle Lewis – Guitar, Guitar (Electric), Vocals
- Tom Lord-Alge – Mixing
- Richard Pagano – Drums
- Shawn Pelton – Drums
- Tony Scherr – Bass, Bass (Acoustic)
- Bill Wittman – Engineer
- Joe Zook – Assistant Producer

== Charts ==
Single

| Year | Single | Chart | Position |
|---|---|---|---|
| 1998 | "Nowhere and Everywhere" | U.S. Billboard Hot Adult Top 40 | 40 |
| 1998 | "Nowhere and Everywhere" | U.S. Billboard Bubbling Under Hot 100 Singles | 21 |
