= Love One Another =

2000 single by Amber

Single by Amber

from the album Amber (1999) and The Hits Remixed (2000)
- Released: 2000
- Genre: House; dance-pop
- Label: Tommy Boy
- Songwriters: Marie- Claire Cremers (Amber); Billy Steinberg; Rick Nowels

Amber singles chronology
"Above the Clouds" (2000)	"Love One Another" (2000)	"Taste the Tears" (2001)

Music video
- "Love One Another" on YouTube

"Love One Another" is a song recorded by Dutch singer Amber in 1999 for her self-titled album. The track was released in 2000, by Tommy Boy Records, as the album's third and final single. It topped the US dance charts. Cher recorded a cover in 2001, which was nominated for the Grammy Award for Best Dance Recording in 2004.

== Amber version ==
=== Track listing ===
Vinyl, US (2000)
No.	Title	Length
1.	"Love One Another" (Rosabel Anthem Mix)	7:38
2.	"Love One Another" (Ralphi Rosario Classic Mix)	7:38
3.	"Love One Another" (Mystica Trance Mix)	5:16
4.	"Love One Another" (Junior Extended Club Mix)	8:26

=== Charts ===
==== Weekly charts ====
Chart (2000)	Peak position
US Hot Dance Club Songs (Billboard)	1

==== Year-end charts ====
Chart (2000)	Peak position
US Hot Dance Club Songs (Billboard)	92

== Cher version ==
"Love One Another"

Single by Cher

from the album Living Proof
- B-side: "When the Money's Gone"
- Released: 4 February 2003
- Recorded: 2001
- Studio: Fredonia International Studios (Los Angeles, CA)
- Genre: Dance-pop; Euro disco
- Length: 3:44
- Label: Warner Bros; Wea
- Songwriters: Billy Steinberg; Marie-Claire Cremers; Rick Nowels
- Producers: Rick Nowels; Chris Cox; Wayne Rodrigues

Cher singles chronology
"When the Money's Gone" (2003)	"Love One Another" (2003)	"Bewitched, Bothered and Bewildered" (2003)

Audio sample
- file; help

Licensed audio
- "Love One Another" on YouTube

In 2001, Cher released her own cover of the song in her Believe follow-up album, Living Proof by the Warner Bros, and WEA. In 2003, "Love One Another" and "When the Money's Gone" were released as Cher's third and final American single. "When the Money's Gone" topped the Billboard's Hot Dance Club Play chart.

The song also earned Cher a Grammy nomination for Best Dance Recording, but she lost the award to Kylie Minogue's song, "Come into My World."

In the album lyrics a misprint was done for the song using the original words from the original artist recording while Cher sings a different set of lyrics

=== Live performances ===
The song is featured on the setlist of her 2002-2005 Farewell Tour, sung as part of the Love Medley on the fifth leg of the tour, only in Europe.

=== Formats and track listings ===
These are the formats and track listings of all single releases of "Love One Another".

US 2 x 12" vinyl (9362 42496–0)

1. "When the Money's Gone" (Brother Brown H&H Vocal Mix)
2. "When the Money's Gone" (Thick Dick Vs Cher Bootleg Mix)
3. "When the Money's Gone" (The Passengerz Hypnotic Club Mix)
4. "Love One Another" (Eddie Baez Club Mix)
5. "Love One Another" (J Star Club Mix)

US CD maxi single (9 42496–2)

1. "When the Money's Gone" (Brother Brown H&H Vocal Mix)
2. "When the Money's Gone" (The Passengerz Club Mix)
3. "When the Money's Gone" (Thick Dick vs. Cher Bootleg Mix)
4. "When the Money's Gone" (Manny Lehman Vocal Mix)
5. "When the Money's Gone" (Brother Brown Dynamo Mix)
6. "Love One Another" (Eddie Baez Club Mix)
7. "Love One Another" (J Star Club Mix)
8. "Love One Another" (Friscia & Lamboy Club Mix)
