= Cher (residency) =

Residency show

- Residency by Cher
- Location: Paradise, Nevada
- Venue: The Colosseum at Caesars Palace
- Start date: May 6, 2008
- End date: February 5, 2011
- Legs: 7
- No. of shows: 192
- Attendance: 697,765
- Box office: US$97,421,298
- Website: Official website

Cher concert chronology
- Living Proof: The Farewell Tour (2002–05); Cher (2008–11); Dressed to Kill Tour (2014)

Cher was the second concert residency by American singer-actress Cher at Caesars Palace on the Las Vegas Strip in Paradise, Nevada. For the three-year engagement, Cher received $60 million. Performing at The Colosseum at Caesars Palace, the first show occurred on May 6, 2008 and the last show was on February 5, 2011. The show included 14 dancers and four aerialists, with a total of 17 costumes designed by Bob Mackie. The residency grossed over $97 million during its three-year run.

== Set list ==
This set list is representative for the opening concert on May 6, 2008. It doesn't represent all shows.

1. "I Still Haven't Found What I'm Looking For"
2. "Song for the Lonely"
3. "All or Nothing"
4. "I Found Someone"
5. "Love Is a Battlefield"
6. "The Beat Goes On"
7. "All I Really Want to Do"
8. "Gypsys, Tramps & Thieves" / "Dark Lady"
9. "Half-Breed"
10. "Don't Leave Me This Way" / "Take Me Home"
11. "Love Hurts"
12. "The Way of Love"
13. "After All"
14. "Walking in Memphis"
15. "The Shoop Shoop Song (It's in His Kiss)"
16. "Strong Enough"
17. "If I Could Turn Back Time"

Encore

18. "Believe"

Notes

- On the first night of the show Cher performed "Love Hurts". It then got removed and during the third leg it was re-added.
- Cher performed "Song for the Lonely" and "All or Nothing" just for the first couple of weeks.
- "I Found Someone" was removed during the third leg.
- During the third leg "The Shoop Shoop Song (It's in His Kiss)" was removed and "The Way of Love" was replaced with "Love Hurts".
- In 2009 Cher performed "Let the Good Times Roll".
- For the show on May 19, 2009 Cher performed "Help Me Make It Through the Night". She said that she performed it for a good friend in the audience.
- In September 2009 "Love Is a Battlefield" was replaced by a Bob Seger medley ("The Fire Down Below"/"Old Time Rock and Roll") and "Strong Enough" was removed.
- After Cher's appearance in the movie Burlesque, the video interlude "I've Gotta Be Me" was replaced with an interlude of "Welcome to Burlesque".

== Shows ==
Date	Attendance	Revenue
Leg 1
May 6, 2008	16,870 / 16,870	$2,547,560
May 7, 2008	16,870 / 16,870	$2,547,560
May 10, 2008	16,870 / 16,870	$2,547,560
May 11, 2008	16,870 / 16,870	$2,547,560
May 13, 2008	16,962 / 16,962	$2,569,083
May 14, 2008	16,962 / 16,962	$2,569,083
May 17, 2008	16,962 / 16,962	$2,569,083
May 18, 2008	16,962 / 16,962	$2,569,083
May 20, 2008	17,022 / 17,022	$2,584,217
May 21, 2008	17,022 / 17,022	$2,584,217
May 24, 2008	17,022 / 17,022	$2,584,217
May 25, 2008	17,022 / 17,022	$2,584,217
May 27, 2008	17,056 / 17,056	$2,589,078
May 28, 2008	17,056 / 17,056	$2,589,078
May 31, 2008	17,056 / 17,056	$2,589,078
June 1, 2008	17,056 / 17,056	$2,589,078
Leg 2
August 6, 2008	12,477 / 12,808	$1,895,526
August 7, 2008	12,477 / 12,808	$1,895,526
August 10, 2008	12,477 / 12,808	$1,895,526
August 12, 2008	17,078 / 17,078	$2,591,497
August 13, 2008	17,078 / 17,078	$2,591,497
August 16, 2008	17,078 / 17,078	$2,591,497
August 17, 2008	17,078 / 17,078	$2,591,497
August 19, 2008	17,061 / 17,061	$2,573,670
August 20, 2008	17,061 / 17,061	$2,573,670
August 23, 2008	17,061 / 17,061	$2,573,670
August 24, 2008	17,061 / 17,061	$2,573,670
August 26, 2008	16,634 / 16,945	$2,538,438
August 27, 2008	16,634 / 16,945	$2,538,438
August 30, 2008	16,634 / 16,945	$2,538,438
August 31, 2008	16,634 / 16,945	$2,538,438
September 2, 2008	11,600 / 12,375	$1,739,643
September 3, 2008	11,600 / 12,375	$1,739,643
September 6, 2008	11,600 / 12,375	$1,739,643
September 9, 2008	8,517 / 8,517	$1,290,796
September 10, 2008	8,517 / 8,517	$1,290,796
September 16, 2008	17,081 / 17,081	$2,596,618
September 17, 2008	17,081 / 17,081	$2,596,618
September 20, 2008	17,081 / 17,081	$2,596,618
September 21, 2008	17,081 / 17,081	$2,596,618
September 30, 2008	8,530 / 8,530	$1,294,960
October 1, 2008	8,530 / 8,530	$1,294,960
Leg 3
February 21, 2009	22,134 / 23,819	$3,331,455
February 22, 2009	22,134 / 23,819	$3,331,455
February 24, 2009	22,134 / 23,819	$3,331,455
February 25, 2009	22,134 / 23,819	$3,331,455
February 28, 2009	22,134 / 23,819	$3,331,455
March 1, 2009	22,134 / 23,819	$3,331,455
March 3, 2009	12,606 / 14,909	$1,844,510
March 4, 2009	12,606 / 14,909	$1,844,510
March 7, 2009	12,606 / 14,909	$1,844,510
March 8, 2009	12,606 / 14,909	$1,844,510
March 10, 2009	13,124 / 15,069	$1,912,403
March 11, 2009	13,124 / 15,069	$1,912,403
March 14, 2009	13,124 / 15,069	$1,912,403
March 15, 2009	13,124 / 15,069	$1,912,403
March 17, 2009	13,095 / 15,166	$1,911,450
March 18, 2009	13,095 / 15,166	$1,911,450
March 20, 2009	13,095 / 15,166	$1,911,450
March 21, 2009	13,095 / 15,166	$1,911,450
April 25, 2009	22,442 / 24,595	$3,294,601
April 26, 2009	22,442 / 24,595	$3,294,601
April 28, 2009	22,442 / 24,595	$3,294,601
April 29, 2009	22,442 / 24,595	$3,294,601
May 2, 2009	22,442 / 24,595	$3,294,601
May 3, 2009	22,442 / 24,595	$3,294,601
May 5, 2009	12,716 / 15,771	$1,781,525
May 6, 2009	12,716 / 15,771	$1,781,525
May 9, 2009	12,716 / 15,771	$1,781,525
May 10, 2009	12,716 / 15,771	$1,781,525
May 12, 2009	26,493 / 29,983	$3,845,125
May 13, 2009	26,493 / 29,983	$3,845,125
May 16, 2009	26,493 / 29,983	$3,845,125
May 17, 2009	26,493 / 29,983	$3,845,125
May 19, 2009	26,493 / 29,983	$3,845,125
May 20, 2009	26,493 / 29,983	$3,845,125
May 23, 2009	26,493 / 29,983	$3,845,125
May 24, 2009	26,493 / 29,983	$3,845,125
Leg 4
September 19, 2009	21,939 / 25,176	$3,199,085
September 20, 2009	21,939 / 25,176	$3,199,085
September 22, 2009	21,939 / 25,176	$3,199,085
September 23, 2009	21,939 / 25,176	$3,199,085
September 26, 2009	21,939 / 25,176	$3,199,085
September 27, 2009	21,939 / 25,176	$3,199,085
September 29, 2009	13,747 / 15,991	$1,956,710
September 30, 2009	13,747 / 15,991	$1,956,710
October 3, 2009	13,747 / 15,991	$1,956,710
October 4, 2009	13,747 / 15,991	$1,956,710
October 6, 2009	15,992 / 16,967	$2,326,062
October 7, 2009	15,992 / 16,967	$2,326,062
October 10, 2009	15,992 / 16,967	$2,326,062
October 11, 2009	15,992 / 16,967	$2,326,062
November 19, 2009	23,432 / 26,914	$3,221,147
November 21, 2009	23,432 / 26,914	$3,221,147
November 22, 2009	23,432 / 26,914	$3,221,147
November 24, 2009	23,432 / 26,914	$3,221,147
November 25, 2009	23,432 / 26,914	$3,221,147
November 28, 2009	23,432 / 26,914	$3,221,147
November 29, 2009	23,432 / 26,914	$3,221,147
December 1, 2009	26,867 / 31,033	$3,335,106
December 2, 2009	26,867 / 31,033	$3,335,106
December 5, 2009	26,867 / 31,033	$3,335,106
December 6, 2009	26,867 / 31,033	$3,335,106
December 8, 2009	26,867 / 31,033	$3,335,106
December 9, 2009	26,867 / 31,033	$3,335,106
December 12, 2009	26,867 / 31,033	$3,335,106
December 13, 2009	26,867 / 31,033	$3,335,106
December 15, 2009	11,826 / 14,564	$1,271,451
December 16, 2009	11,826 / 14,564	$1,271,451
December 19, 2009	11,826 / 14,564	$1,271,451
December 20, 2009	11,826 / 14,564	$1,271,451
Leg 5
April 10, 2010	35,343 / 40,168	$4,910,221
April 11, 2010	35,343 / 40,168	$4,910,221
April 13, 2010	35,343 / 40,168	$4,910,221
April 14, 2010	35,343 / 40,168	$4,910,221
April 17, 2010	35,343 / 40,168	$4,910,221
April 18, 2010	35,343 / 40,168	$4,910,221
April 20, 2010	35,343 / 40,168	$4,910,221
April 21, 2010	35,343 / 40,168	$4,910,221
April 24, 2010	35,343 / 40,168	$4,910,221
April 25, 2010	35,343 / 40,168	$4,910,221
April 27, 2010	5,727 / 7,049	$735,618
April 28, 2010	5,727 / 7,049	$735,618
May 8, 2010	27,243 / 33,324	$3,411,693
May 9, 2010	27,243 / 33,324	$3,411,693
May 11, 2010	27,243 / 33,324	$3,411,693
May 12, 2010	27,243 / 33,324	$3,411,693
May 15, 2010	27,243 / 33,324	$3,411,693
May 16, 2010	27,243 / 33,324	$3,411,693
May 18, 2010	27,243 / 33,324	$3,411,693
May 19, 2010	27,243 / 33,324	$3,411,693
May 23, 2010	27,243 / 33,324	$3,411,693
May 25, 2010	12,042 / 16,216	$1,538,211
May 26, 2010	12,042 / 16,216	$1,538,211
May 29, 2010	12,042 / 16,216	$1,538,211
May 30, 2010	12,042 / 16,216	$1,538,211
June 15, 2010	14,296 / 16,660	$1,727,400
June 16, 2010	14,296 / 16,660	$1,727,400
June 19, 2010	14,296 / 16,660	$1,727,400
June 20, 2010	14,296 / 16,660	$1,727,400
June 22, 2010	13,255 / 16,565	$1,553,125
June 23, 2010	13,255 / 16,565	$1,553,125
June 26, 2010	13,255 / 16,565	$1,553,125
June 27, 2010	13,255 / 16,565	$1,553,125
June 29, 2010	12,121 / 15,968	$1,363,671
June 30, 2010	12,121 / 15,968	$1,363,671
July 3, 2010	12,121 / 15,968	$1,363,671
July 4, 2010	12,121 / 15,968	$1,363,671
Leg 6
September 4, 2010	18,084 / 23,113	$2,180,153
September 5, 2010	18,084 / 23,113	$2,180,153
September 7, 2010	18,084 / 23,113	$2,180,153
September 8, 2010	18,084 / 23,113	$2,180,153
September 10, 2010	18,084 / 23,113	$2,180,153
September 11, 2010	18,084 / 23,113	$2,180,153
September 21, 2010	29,043 / 33,560	$3,630,738
September 22, 2010	29,043 / 33,560	$3,630,738
September 25, 2010	29,043 / 33,560	$3,630,738
September 26, 2010	29,043 / 33,560	$3,630,738
September 28, 2010	29,043 / 33,560	$3,630,738
September 29, 2010	29,043 / 33,560	$3,630,738
October 2, 2010	29,043 / 33,560	$3,630,738
October 3, 2010	29,043 / 33,560	$3,630,738
October 5, 2010	23,690 / 25,254	$3,102,204
October 6, 2010	23,690 / 25,254	$3,102,204
October 9, 2010	23,690 / 25,254	$3,102,204
October 10, 2010	23,690 / 25,254	$3,102,204
October 16, 2010	23,690 / 25,254	$3,102,204
October 17, 2010	23,690 / 25,254	$3,102,204
October 19, 2010	30,342 / 33,723	$3,846,894
October 20, 2010	30,342 / 33,723	$3,846,894
October 23, 2010	30,342 / 33,723	$3,846,894
October 24, 2010	30,342 / 33,723	$3,846,894
October 26, 2010	30,342 / 33,723	$3,846,894
October 27, 2010	30,342 / 33,723	$3,846,894
October 30, 2010	30,342 / 33,723	$3,846,894
October 31, 2010	30,342 / 33,723	$3,846,894
Leg 7
January 11, 2011	31,131 / 33,038	$4,577,104
January 12, 2011	31,131 / 33,038	$4,577,104
January 15, 2011	31,131 / 33,038	$4,577,104
January 16, 2011	31,131 / 33,038	$4,577,104
January 18, 2011	31,131 / 33,038	$4,577,104
January 19, 2011	31,131 / 33,038	$4,577,104
January 22, 2011	31,131 / 33,038	$4,577,104
January 23, 2011	31,131 / 33,038	$4,577,104
January 25, 2011	32,147 / 33,656	$4,802,550
January 26, 2011	32,147 / 33,656	$4,802,550
January 29, 2011	32,147 / 33,656	$4,802,550
January 30, 2011	32,147 / 33,656	$4,802,550
February 1, 2011	32,147 / 33,656	$4,802,550
February 2, 2011	32,147 / 33,656	$4,802,550
February 4, 2011	32,147 / 33,656	$4,802,550
February 5, 2011	32,147 / 33,656	$4,802,550
Total	697,765 / 776,556 (90%)	$97,421,298

== Personnel ==
=== Band ===
- Lead vocals - Cher
- Background vocals - Stacy Campbell, Jenny Douglas-Foote, Patti Russo, Danni Gee, and Nichelle Tillman
- Musical Director/Keyboards/Vocals - Paul Mirkovich
- Guitars/Background Vocals - David Barry
- Drums - Mark Schulman or Nate Morton
- Keyboards - Darrell Smith
- Bass - Alexander (Sasha) Krivstov
- Tenor Saxophone - Glenn Erwin

== See also ==
- List of most-attended concert series at a single venue
