= Song for the Lonely =

2002 single by Cher

Single by Cher

from the album Living Proof
- Released: January 11, 2002
- Recorded: 2001
- Studio: Metrophonic Studios
- Venue: London, England
- Genre: Dance-pop
- Length: 4:01 (album version); 3:21 (radio edit)
- Label: Warner Bros; WEA
- Songwriters: Mark Taylor; Paul Barry; Steve Torch
- Producer: Mark Taylor

Cher singles chronology
"The Music's No Good Without You" (2001)	"Song for the Lonely" (2002)	"Alive Again" (2002)

Music video
- "Song for the Lonely" on YouTube

"Song for the Lonely" (Note: In the European and international editions of Living Proof, it is listed as "(This Is) A Song for the Lonely".) is a song by American singer Cher from her twenty-fourth studio album, Living Proof (2001). It was written by Mark Taylor, Paul Barry and Steve Torch, and produced by Taylor. It was released on January 11, 2002 as the second international single from the album by Warner Bros. Records and WEA, while in North America it served as the lead single. "Song for the Lonely" is a dance-pop song which was initially written as a love song, but after the September 11 attacks Cher eventually saw it in a different way.

"Song for the Lonely" was met with positive reviews, with music commentators complimenting its heartfelt lyrics and beat. Commercially, the song peaked at number 85 on the US Billboard Hot 100, but topped the Maxi-Singles Sales and the Dance Club Play charts. It also reached the top forty in Canada, The Czech Republic, and Romania. The accompanying music video for "Song for the Lonely" was directed by Stu Maschwitz in New York City, and depicts Cher walking through the streets of the city since the 18th century until the modern days, while she is joined by several people from those times. To promote the song, Cher performed it on the American Music Awards of 2002, The Tonight Show with Jay Leno, and later included it on the setlists of her Living Proof: The Farewell Tour (2002–05) and her concert residency Cher (2008–11).

== Background and release ==
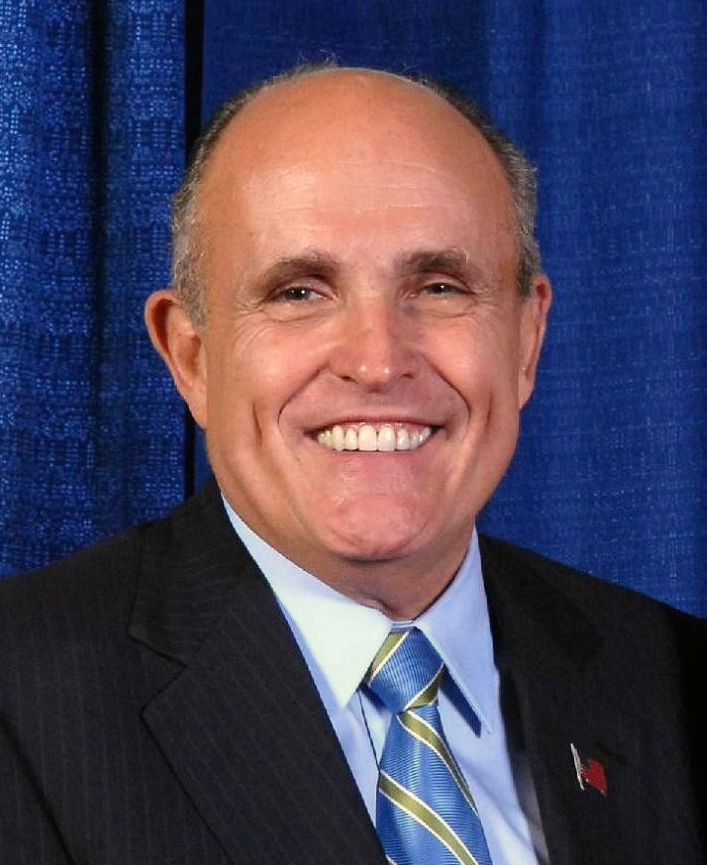
The song is dedicated to Rudy Giuliani (pictured) among others.

"Song for the Lonely" was written and recorded by Cher in London before the September 11 attacks, and intended to include it on her twenty-fourth studio album Living Proof (2001), and it immediately became her favorite song from the record. However, she began thinking of it in a different way after the attacks. In an interview with Larry King Live she stated that she was listening to the album and when the track began, all of a sudden it took on a completely different meaning for her, especially because of the "when heroes fall in love and war, they live forever" line. Cher commented that "Song for the Lonely" was one of the best tracks she has ever had the opportunity to sing, because according to her, "we still lived in a world of innocence" before the attacks. According to the album liner notes, "Song for the Lonely" is "dedicated to the courageous people of New York especially the fire fighters, the police, Mayor Giuliani, Governor Pataki and my friend Liz".

The public's initial reaction to "Song for the Lonely" was positive. James Lonten, manager of a Borders store in New York City, which had been stocking Living Proof since its European release, commented, "That goes without saying. We play the track in-store, and it literally stops people dead in their tracks. It's an instantly affecting, highly emotional song". John Boulos, senior vice-president of promotion at Warner Bros. Records, commented that they were not exploiting the September 11 attacks as a selling point to the single, but it had drawn the interest of people. "We simply feel that we have an incredible song by a truly legendary artist. That's a pretty potent combination to take it to the street", he said. "Song for the Lonely" was sent to radio stations in the United States on January 11, 2002 by Warner Bros. Records and WEA, serving as the lead single from Living Proof in North America. It was later included on three of Cher's compilation albums: The Very Best of Cher (2003), Gold (2005), and Forever (2024).

== Composition ==
"Song for the Lonely"
Critics praised the song's heartfelt lyrics and beat.

"Song for the Lonely" is a guitar-laden dance-pop song. Mark Taylor and Paul Barry, who also worked on her previous hit single "Believe" (1998), wrote the track, "giving the song a frenetic, knee-bobbing urgency that will wash the gray out of any winter day", according to Billboard's Chuck Taylor. The music commentator also noted that the lack of vocoder, which had become a signature on Cher's songs, allowed Cher to "foster a grin" with opening notes, until the song reaches the chorus – which Taylor said it was one of the catchiest since Hanson's "MMMBop" (1997) – and "explodes into a rhythmic tantrum". When Cher recorded the track, she thought of it as a love song, but after the September 11 attacks, the singer felt the song was right for the occasion. "Since the world has changed so dramatically, the lyrics have a different weight. They're heavier, yet they're comforting at the same time. Over the past month or so, I've had a number of people tell me that the song has helped them cope. What a humbling compliment", she commented. Tony Peregrin from PopMatters noted that the song delivers "a message that is achingly emotional and somber".

== Critical reception ==
"Song for the Lonely" received generally positive reviews from music critics. While reviewing Living Proof, Billboard's Michael Paoletta commented that the song was "an empowering jam that deserves to rock the world just as 'Believe' did". In a separate review for the single, Chuck Taylor from the same magazine opined that "anyone who thought 'Believe' was merely a stroke of good fortune on Cher's mile-long scorecard will be singing a different tune after one spin of the life-affirming '(This Is) A Song for the Lonely [sic]'", because "this track is so good, in fact, that it's up for debate as to whether it actually tops that previous winner". He finished his review by writing that "Boy, is "Song for the Lonely" ever an elixir for whatever ails you, a joyous romp with such mass appeal that its destination at the top of the charts seems a given".

Kerry L. Smith from AllMusic praised the song, saying, "Cher takes a brief break from her inquisitiveness about love to dedicate the bold, heartfelt opening track, in honor of the September 11th tragedy, 'Song for the Lonely'". Barry Walters of Rolling Stone also agreed by writing that it "clearly intends to evoke September 11th", adding that "coming from a willfully wiggy billion-dollar diva, this noble stuff feels calculated, particularly when it's presented in such a sparkling, showbizzy package". Metro Weekly's Gordon Ashenhurst called it a "rousing lead single", while Sal Cinquemani from Slant Magazine noted that it "wisely abandons such (otherwise welcomed) electronic shenanigans for a pure and impassioned performance". Tony Peregrin of PopMatters deemed the song "an infectious, energetic track that rides the waves of predictable synth pads and pulsating beats".

== Commercial performance ==
In the United States, "Song for the Lonely" debuted at its peak of number 85 on the Billboard Hot 100, on the issue dated April 6, 2002. It spent six weeks inside the chart. The song attained better positions on other component charts, such as topping both the Maxi-Singles Sales and the Dance Club Play charts, as well as peaking within the top 20 on the Adult Contemporary chart, and peaking in the top 40 on the Adult Top 40 and Mainstream Top 40. The single sold 17,714 copies in its first six weeks of retail release in the US, even though it had received heavy pre-release airplay. Alan Jones of Music Week cited it as an example of the sharp decline in US single sales over the previous two years. "Song for the Lonely" reached number 18 on the Canadian Singles Chart, and despite being released only in North America, it reached number 39 in Romania through airplay.

== Music video ==
Cher (front) in the music video for "Song for the Lonely", as people around her are dressed in old-style clothes

The accompanying music video for "Song for the Lonely" was directed by Stu Maschwitz, and was filmed in the streets of New York City in December 2001. A first-time director and an architecture enthusiast, Maschwitz sent Warner Bros. Records an idea for the video, featuring a Cher-guided tour through New York City's history, exemplified by a multiple reverse-timelapses of some of the great buildings of the city rising up before the viewer's eyes. After receiving news that he got the job following the singer's personal liking for the project, they would start filming the following weeks. The crew received special permission from Mayor Rudy Giuliani's office for live audio playback in the streets of Manhattan, a practice that had recently been outlawed.

Cher had done her own makeup, as her makeup artist Kevyn Aucoin was nowhere to be found due to his struggling with a terminal illness. At one point of the shooting, they needed to cover some parts of the streets with big, loud smoke machines. As the attacks were still a fresh and painful memory for the citizens, complaints about the smoke started coming in. The police officer manning the intersection gave word that they would have to shut down their atmospheric effects, but they still had one more shot. The director solved this by taking Cher and the script supervisor's camera, and autographing a polaroid to the cop, to continue the last smoked-up shooting.

The video starts in sepia tone, featuring Cher walking around the streets of New York City. While the setting for the start of the video is in the 18th century, the singer is dressed in modern-day clothes. The video progresses to black and white, and then to color, as the times for the setting of the video change to the 19th century through various eras to the 20th century. As the timeline changes, buildings around New York are shown being constructed. The video is intercept with shots of Cher dressed in white, which is overlaid in some shots, as well as shots of New York City from the air. People from each stage of the development of the city join Cher as she walks the streets until at the end, there is a large crowd of people from all eras. In 2002, the video was released on VHS to serve as promotion in the United States. An alternative version for the video for "Song for the Lonely" was included on the DVD The Very Best of Cher: The Video Hits Collection (2004).

== Live performances ==
Cher made a number of live performances to promote "Song for the Lonely" at the time of its release. She opened the 2002 American Music Awards on January 9, 2002 with a performance of the song, accompanied by dancers and wearing a blonde wig. She also appeared on The Rosie O'Donnell Show, The Tonight Show with Jay Leno, The Oprah Winfrey Show, Late Show with David Letterman and VH1 Divas promoting the song. It was later added to Cher's 2002–05 Living Proof: The Farewell Tour setlist. During the first four legs of the tour, as the second song on the setlist; the performance for the song began when the singer's back-up dancers removed her headdress and robe to unveil a revealing midriff-baring vest and beaded harem pants. After dropping it for five legs, the song was re-added only on the last show at Hollywood Bowl in Los Angeles on May 2, 2005, where it was used as tour finale. Cher also performed the song on the 2008–11 concert residency Cher, held at Caesars Palace in Las Vegas, Nevada but only for a couple of weeks.

Cher would perform "Song for the Lonely" again years later, as part of the annual Love Rocks NYC benefit concert, held on March 6, 2025 at New York's Beacon Theatre. For the performance she wore striped winter hat and puffer jacket, while images of old New York were displayed behind her, "celebrating the spirit of the city's resilience". She would also perform the track at Dolce & Gabbana's Alta Moda event in Rome, Italy, on July 12, 2025, wearing a platinum blonde wig styled with waves and an army green jumpsuit layered under a sparkly corset.

== Usage in media ==
In 2005, "Song for the Lonely" was used internationally in television advertisements for Weight Watchers showing overweight women. However, the choice of song, suggesting that the overweight women were desperate, lonely and unloved, raised complaints, and the advert was soon edited to include only the instrumental of the song. "Song for the Lonely" was also included in the jukebox musical The Cher Show (2018). A recording of the song appears in the Broadway musical Bloody Bloody Andrew Jackson.

== Track listing ==
US CD maxi single

1. "Song for the Lonely" (Almighty mix) – 8:46
2. "Song for the Lonely" (Illicit vocal mix) – 8:09
3. "Song for the Lonely" (Thunderpuss club mix) – 8:43
4. "Song for the Lonely" (Thunderpuss Sunrise mix) – 8:25
5. "Song for the Lonely" (Almighty radio mix) – 3:34
6. "Song for the Lonely" (Illicit radio edit) – 3:51
7. "Song for the Lonely" (Thunderpuss radio edit) – 4:06

Digital download

1. "Song for the Lonely" (Almighty radio mix) – 3:34
2. "Song for the Lonely" (Illicit radio edit) – 3:51
3. "Song for the Lonely" (Thunderpuss radio edit) – 4:06

== Credits and personnel ==
Credits adapted from Living Proof and CD maxi single liner notes.

- Cher – vocals
- Mark Taylor – songwriter, producer, mixing
- Paul Barry – songwriter, guitar
- Steve Torch – songwriter
- Tracer Ackerman – background vocals
- Adam Phillips – guitar
- Jong uk Yoon – assistant
- Christian Saint Val – assistant
- Neil Tucker – assistant
- SMOG Design, Inc. – art direction, design
- Barrie Goshko – art direction

== Charts ==
=== Weekly charts ===
Chart (2002)	Peak position
Canada (Nielsen SoundScan)	18
Czech Republic (IFPI)	13
Italy Airplay (Music & Media)	16
Poland Airplay (Music & Media)	11
Romania (Romanian Top 100)	39
UK Club Chart (Music Week)	24
US Billboard Hot 100	85
US Adult Contemporary (Billboard)	11
US Adult Pop Airplay (Billboard)	31
US Dance Club Songs (Billboard)	1
US Dance Singles Sales (Billboard)	1
US Pop Airplay (Billboard)	38

=== Year-end charts ===
Chart (2002)	Position
Canada (Nielsen SoundScan)	180
US Dance Club Play (Billboard)	28
US Maxi-Singles Sales (Billboard)	3

== Release history ==
Release dates and formats for "Song for the Lonely"
Region	Date	Format(s)	Label(s)	Ref(s).
United States	January 11, 2002	Contemporary hit radio; hot adult contemporary radio	Warner Bros; WEA	

== See also ==
- List of number-one dance singles of 2002 (U.S.)
