= When the Money's Gone =

1995 song by Bruce Roberts and Donna Weiss

Single by Bruce Roberts

from the album Intimacy
- Released: September 19, 1995
- Recorded: 1995
- Genre: Dance
- Length: 5:43
- Label: Atlantic
- Songwriters: Bruce Roberts; Donna Weiss
- Producers: Bruce Roberts; Warren Rigg

Bruce Roberts singles chronology
"When the Money's Gone" (1995)	"Whenever There Is Love" (1996)

"When the Money's Gone" is a song written by Bruce Roberts and Donna Weiss and first released by Roberts on his 1995 album Intimacy. English musician Elton John provided backing vocals. An uptempo dance remix featuring Kristine W was also issued. The track peaked at number thirty-two on Billboard's Hot Dance Club Play chart.

In 2003 the song was released as the last North American single by American singer-actress Cher from her twenty-fourth studio album, Living Proof. It was released in 2003 by Warner Bros, and WEA.

== Charts ==
Chart (1995)	Peak position
US Dance Club Songs (Billboard)	32

== Cher version ==
"When the Money's Gone"

Single by Cher

from the album Living Proof
- A-side: "Love One Another"
- Released: February 4, 2003
- Recorded: 2001
- Genre: Dance-pop; tech house
- Length: 4:40
- Label: Warner Bros; Wea
- Songwriters: Bruce Roberts; Donna Weiss
- Producers: Bruce Roberts; Warren Rigg

Cher singles chronology
"A Different Kind of Love Song" (2002)	"When the Money's Gone" (2003)	"Love One Another" (2003)

Licensed audio
- "When the Money's Gone" on YouTube

In 2001, Cher released a cover of the song on her album, Living Proof. In 2003, "When the Money's Gone" with the song "Love One Another" as its B-side was released as Cher's third and final American single. "Love One Another" earned Cher a Grammy nomination for Best Dance Recording; however, she lost the award to Kylie Minogue's song, "Come into My World". Cher performed "Love One Another" on The Farewell Tour and was sung as part of the Love Medley on the fifth leg of the tour only in Europe.

=== Track listing ===
US CD Maxi Single (42496-2)

1. "When The Money's Gone" (Brother Brown H&H Vocal Mix) - 8.06
2. "When The Money's Gone" (The Passengerz Club Mix) - 7.29
3. "When The Money's Gone" (Thick Dick Vs. Cher Bootleg Mix) - 8.09
4. "When The Money's Gone" (Manny Lehman Vocal) - 9.26
5. "When The Money's Gone" (Brother Brown Dynamo Mix) - 7.37
6. "Love One Another" (Eddie Baez Club Mix) - 8.49
7. "Love One Another" (J Start Club Mix) - 8..05
8. "Love One Another" (Friscia & Lamboy Club Mix) - 9.43

=== Critical reception ===
Allmusic editor Kerry L. Smith wrote that fans and club kids would appreciate the "rapid-fire drum beats on th[is] airy track". Slant Magazine called this song one of the worst moments on the album but still praised it for "maintain[ing] the high-energy, club-ready pace [of the album]".

=== Charts ===
==== Weekly charts ====
Chart (2003)	Peak position
Romania (Romanian Top 100)	72
US Dance Club Songs (Billboard)	1
US Dance Singles Sales (Billboard)	2
US Hot Singles Sales (Billboard)	7

==== Year-end charts ====
Chart (2003)	Peak position
US Dance Club Songs (Billboard)	49

== See also ==
- List of Billboard Hot Dance Music/Club Play number ones of 2003
