= A Different Kind of Love Song =

Single by Cher

from the album Living Proof
- A-side: "The Music's No Good Without You"
- Released: July 2002
- Studio: Eclectic Studios (Stockholm, Sweden); Metropolis Studios (London, England)
- Genre: Dance-pop
- Length: 3:51
- Label: Warner Bros; WEA
- Songwriters: Sigurd Rosnes; Johan Aberg; Michelle Lewis
- Producers: Sigurd Rosnes; Johan Aberg; Anders Hansson

Cher singles chronology
"Alive Again" (2002)	"A Different Kind of Love Song" (2002)	"When the Money's Gone" (2003)

Licensed audio
- "Different Kind of Love Song" on YouTube

"A Different Kind of Love Song" is a song by American recording artist Cher, taken from her 24th studio album, Living Proof (2001). The song was written and produced by Sigurd Rosnes and Johan Aberg, with additional writing done by Michelle Lewis, and was co-produced by Anders Hansson. The dance-pop song alludes to themes of tragedy, heroism and brotherhood, and was released as a double A-side single with "The Music's No Good Without You" in July 2002 through Warner Bros. Records and WEA.

"A Different Kind of Love Song" received mostly positive reviews from music critics, who deemed it one of the album's highlights, although noting Cher's heavily processed vocals due to the use of auto-tune. The song charted on a few Billboard components, such as Dance/Club Play Songs, where it reached number one, Hot Dance Music/Maxi-Singles Sales, peaking at number two, and on the Adult Contemporary chart. No accompanying music video was commissioned for "A Different Kind of Love Song"; however, the track was performed a few times by Cher, including on a Will & Grace episode, her concert tour Living Proof: The Farewell Tour, and during the 50th American Bandstand in 2002.

== Composition and release ==
"A Different Kind of Love Song"
A 23-second sample of the song's chorus features Cher's heavily processed vocals over a dance-pop background.

"A Different Kind of Love Song" is a dance-pop song written and produced by Johan Aberg, while additional writing was done by Michelle Lewis, and Sigurd Rosnes. Anders Hansson co-produced the song. According to Michael Paoletta of Billboard, the track "finds [Cher] not rocking the "Believe" boat too much: the chorus is soaring, the beats are foot-stomping, and the singer's vocals are gloriously affected." Jim Farber of Entertainment Weekly perceived that Cher's vocals are heavily processed due to the use of auto-tune. Lyrically, "A Different Kind of Love Song" alludes to themes of tragedy, heroism and brotherhood, as noted by Rolling Stone journalist Barry Walters. The song was also treated with different remixes done by producers such as Rodney Jerkins. In an interview with MTV News, Jerkins expressed that he was flattered to be working with Cher. He further added, "It's incredible to be able to work with a true diva. Cher said she just wanted me to do my thing, which was the most incredible thing in the world. And I had fun doing it." His remix was included on the 2003 compilation album The Very Best of Cher. "A Different Kind of Love Song" was released as a single in July 2002, with "The Music's No Good Without You" as its A-side.

== Promotion ==
No music video was made for "A Different Kind of Love Song". However, Cher performed it on the comedy series Will & Grace in 2002, where she made a special guest appearance in the episode, "AI: Artificial Insemination Part 2", as God. The singer also performed the track during the first leg of the Living Proof: The Farewell Tour, and on April 20, 2002, during the 50th American Bandstand. A live video taken from Living Proof: The Farewell Tour is included as a bonus on The Farewell Tour DVD.

== Reception ==
Michael Paoletta of Billboard considered the album version of the song "perfect", but questioned that "it may be too upbeat for clubland". Reviewing Living Proof, Jim Farber of Entertainer Weekly noted that the songs "have enough oomph to make this more than a one-shot comeback," while Kerry L. Smith of Allmusic selected it as a "track pick" from his album review. Slant Magazine called the song "euphoric".

"A Different Kind of Love Song" charted on a few Billboard components. On the chart issue dated August 31, 2002, the song reached the top position on the Dance/Club Play Songs, and peaked at number 30 on the Adult Contemporary chart. It also peaked at number two on the Hot Dance Music/Maxi Singles chart.

== Track listings ==
US CD Maxi Single (942455-2)

1. "A Different Kind Of Love Song" (Rosabel Attitude Vocal) - 8:56
2. "A Different Kind Of Love Song" (Murk Main Mix) - 9:06
3. "A Different Kind Of Love Song" (Ralphi's Alternative Vox) - 9:47
4. "A Different Kind Of Love Song" (Rodney Jerkins Main Mix (Faster) - 4:19
5. "A Different Kind Of Love Song" (Johnny Rocks Mix Show Edit) - 5:40
6. "A Different Kind Of Love Song" (Lenny B.'s Different Kind Of Club Mix) - 7:15
7. "A Different Kind Of Love Song" (Craig J. Classic Love Mix) - 7:04
8. "The Music's No Good Without You" (Almighty 12" Mix) - 8:04
9. "The Music's No Good Without You" (Walter Taieb Mix) - 7:40

== Credits and personnel ==
- Cher - vocals
- Johan Aberg - writer, producer, bass, guitars, keyboard, programming, mixing
- Michelle Lewis - writer
- Sigurd Rosnes - writer
- Anders Hansson - producer
- Neil Tucker - assistant engineer
- Esbjörn Gunnarsson - bass
- Ziggy - backing vocals, keyboard, programming
- Dennis B - keyboard, programming, mixing
- Björn Engelmann - mixing
- Marie Diephuise - backing vocals

Credits adapted from Living Proof liner notes.

== Charts ==
=== Weekly charts ===
Chart (2002)	Peak position
Romania (Romanian Top 100)	28
US Adult Contemporary (Billboard)	30
US Dance Club Songs (Billboard)	1
US Dance Singles Sales (Billboard)	2
US Hot Singles Sales (Billboard)	11

=== Year-end charts ===
Chart (2002)	Position
US Dance Club Songs (Billboard)	7
US Hot Dance Maxi-Singles Sales (Billboard)	13

== See also ==
- List of number-one dance singles of 2002 (U.S.)
