= The Music's No Good Without You =

2001 single by Cher

Single by Cher

from the album Living Proof
- B-side: "A Different Kind of Love Song"
- Released: November 5, 2001
- Recorded: 2001
- Genre: Disco; dance-pop
- Length: 4:42
- Label: Warner Bros; WEA
- Songwriters: Cher; James Thomas; Mark Taylor; Paul Barry
- Producers: Mark Taylor; James Thomas; Jeff Taylor

Cher singles chronology
"Più che puoi" (2001)	"The Music's No Good Without You" (2001)	"Song for the Lonely" (2002)

Audio video
- "The Music's No Good Without You" on YouTube

"The Music's No Good Without You" is a song recorded by American singer Cher for her twenty-fourth studio album, Living Proof. It was released in the United Kingdom on November 5, 2001, while in the United States, it was released in 2002. The song reached the top 20 in many countries worldwide, expanding Cher's chart success into five decades.

== Background and composition ==
After releasing her album Believe in 1998 and achieving significant success with its singles, particularly the lead single "Believe", Cher released her compilation, The Greatest Hits in 1999, and later released Not.com.mercial, in 2000, her first album not sold in stores but exclusively online. Later, in 2001, Cher reunited with the UK-rooted production team of Taylor and Brian Rawlings, who helmed the single "Believe" and much of the ensuing album. Cher also collaborated with Rick Nowels, British musician/producer Chicane, and Norwegian team Stargate. Cher described the album, titled Living Proof, as "a record with a notably positive lyrical tone." She further added, "[...] This had subconsciously become an album filled with love and warmth. It was a pleasant surprise, and it's certainly an appropriate time to put some positive energy out into the world."

"The Music's No Good Without You" was released as the album's first British single on November 5, 2001. The single was also released as a double A-side single, along with "A Different Kind of Love Song", on August 13, 2002. "The Music's No Good Without You" was written by Cher, James Thomas, Mark Taylor and Paul Barry, while production was done by Taylor, with co-production by Thomas and Jeff Taylor. The song is drenched in hypnotic synth lines and computer-savvy vocal effects.

== Critical reception ==
The song received mostly mixed reviews from music critics. Kerry L. Smith of AllMusic gave a negative review, writing that, "the lingering sense of loss and longing echoing through on tracks like 'The Music's No Good Without You' suggest that maybe Cher isn't the only one left still waiting for something truly magical to happen on this record." Tony Peregrin of PopMatters called it one of the album's imperfections, "where Cher’s voice has been manipulated to such an extent she sounds like the embodiment of a haunted extra-terrestrial, whatever that is."

Sal Cinquemani of Slant Magazine was more favorable, writing that, "Cher's voice is virtually unrecognizable on the French techno thumper that would have made a brave lead single here in the U.S. as well."

== Chart performance ==
The song became a top-10 hit in Canada, Italy, Spain, Portugal, and the United Kingdom, while elsewhere, it became either a top-20 or top-40 hit. With a peak of number eight on the UK Singles Chart, Cher became the only female recording artist to have top 10 hits in every decade, beginning in the 1960s (her first top-10 hit was "All I Really Want to Do" in 1965). It was Cher's 12th consecutive and 33rd overall top-40 single in the UK and the last single released until "I Hope You Find It" in 2013.

In the United States, the album Living Proof was not released until February 2002, and its lead single was "Song for the Lonely". By the time "The Music's No Good Without You", along with "A Different Kind of Love Song", was released as a single in the United States, Cher was already on tour, which led to a lack of promotion. "The Music's No Good Without You" was exclusively released as a club single in the US only; the song peaked at number 19 on the Billboard Hot Dance Club Play chart.

== Music video ==
Cher in the music video for "The Music's No Good Without You"

The accompanying music video for "The Music's No Good Without You" was directed by Nigel Dick, who had previously directed Cher's music videos for "Believe" and "Strong Enough". It was filmed on October 7–8, 2001, on an elaborate sound stage with a "spaced out" design at Nikken Building, in Irvine, California. The director commented, "Cher is about the only other person I know who knows anything about Gormenghast – and that was my model for this video". The video follows the concept of the lyrics of the song. In the music video Cher is an outer space queen who is sad because her lover has left her. Throughout the whole video she writes a letter claiming that she knows he doesn't need her anymore. In the end she places the letter in an empty bottle and sends it floating into space. It appears that this had not been the first letter that she had sent to him because there are dozens of bottles floating in space.

A remix video was made for "The Music's No Good Without You". The remix video was the entitled Almighty Edit and the remix used for the video was the radio edit of the Almighty mix. The video was officially released by Warner Bros. as a promo only.

In 2001 the video for "The Music's No Good Without You" was commercially released in the UK on a box set which included the video in PAL format. In the box set the song and three promotional pictures were also included.

== Charts ==
=== Weekly charts ===
Chart (2001–2002)	Peak position
Australia (ARIA)	23
Austria (Ö3 Austria Top 40)	24
Belgium (Ultratop 50 Flanders)	28
Belgium (Ultratop 50 Wallonia)	31
Canada (Nielsen SoundScan)	5
Denmark (Tracklisten)	14
Denmark Airplay (Tracklisten)	12
Europe (Eurochart Hot 100)	21
Europe (European Radio Top 50)	1
Finland (Suomen virallinen lista)	19
France (SNEP)	45
Germany (GfK)	27
Ireland (IRMA)	25
Italy (FIMI)	4
Netherlands (Dutch Top 40)	21
Netherlands (Single Top 100)	25
Norway (VG-lista)	20
Portugal (AFP)	6
Romania (Romanian Top 100)	5
Russia Airplay (Music & Media)	6
Scotland Singles (Official Charts)	8
Spain (Promusicae)	8
Sweden (Sverigetopplistan)	13
Switzerland (Schweizer Hitparade)	22
UK Singles (Official Charts)	8
UK Club Chart (Music Week)	11
US Dance Club Songs (Billboard)	19

=== Year-end charts ===
Chart (2001)	Position
Canada (Nielsen SoundScan)	125
Netherlands (Dutch Top 40)	182
UK Singles (OCC)	178

Chart (2002)	Position
Canada (Nielsen SoundScan)	150
