= Paul Barry (songwriter) =

British songwriter and musician

Paul Michael Barry (born 1962) is a British songwriter and musician. He has written or co-written numerous hit songs, including "Believe" by Cher, "Hero" and "Bailamos" by Enrique Iglesias and the five-times platinum U.S. single "Let It Go" by James Bay. He has won three Ivor Novello Awards and ASCAP PRS writer of the year 2000.

His songs have been recorded by many other artists including Lionel Richie, James Morrison, Celine Dion, Ricky Martin, Lemar, Craig David, Tina Turner, Britney Spears, Rod Stewart, Lara Fabian, Ronan Keating, Esmee Denters, JLS, Rebecca Ferguson, the Vamps, Nelly Furtado, Beverley Knight, Mica Paris, Andrew Roachford and Tom Walker, among others.

== Career ==
Barry was born in Edinburgh, Scotland in March 1962. His first band the Questions signed with Bruce Findlay's Zoom Records in 1978. The band subsequently signed to Paul Weller's label Respond Records in 1981. He co-wrote "The House That Jack Built" for Tracie Young which reached number 9 on the UK charts in 1983.

In the 1990s, Barry was a member of the Eurodance reggae fusion group Dreamhouse, best known for their covers of "Stay" and "Sha La La". He then continued his songwriting career, writing for many artists, including five songs on the multi-platinum LP Believe by Cher, including "Strong Enough" and "Believe". He also co-wrote the Cher songs "Song for the Lonely" and "The Music's No Good Without You" from the Living Proof album. Barry has also worked with Enrique Iglesias, initially writing for and later collaborating with him. He has been a source of eight singles from four albums of Iglesias, including "Hero", "Bailamos" and "Be with You", the latter two songs reaching the number one spot on the Billboard Hot 100. "Hero" stayed at number three in the US for four weeks, and was number one in the UK and several other countries. Other hits include "Rhythm Divine", "Love to See You Cry" and "Not in Love" (featuring Kelis).

Barry worked with Lionel Richie for his Renaissance album, co-writing six songs, including the singles "Angel", "Don't Stop the Music" and "Tender Heart", then on five songs for Richie's Just for You album, including the title track, which Richie re-recorded on his No. 1 US album Tuskegee.

Barry co-wrote the Bryan McFadden/Delta Goodrem duet "Almost Here", which first brought the two artists together, and was number one in Ireland and Australia, as well as number three in the UK. Barry worked with James Morrison on two songs for his Songs for You, Truths for Me album, including the first single "You Make It Real". He also contributed two songs for JLS's debut album JLS and "Another World" for the Vamps' debut album, Meet the Vamps. Barry co-wrote James Bay's single "Let It Go" and Nelly Furtado's song "Phoenix" (also co-written by Mark Taylor) for her sixth album The Ride. In 2013 and 2017, he worked with Shane Filan of Irish boy band Westlife on four tracks from the albums You and Me and Love Always, which charted in the top 10 of both the UK and Irish album charts.

Barry also co-wrote "Cry Out" with Tom Walker for his UK number one album What a Time to Be Alive. He co-wrote the single "Mama Said" from the Mica Paris album Gospel (Mica Paris album). Paris also covered Barry's song "In Broad Daylight", written after the murder of George Floyd.

== Selected singles discography ==
| Artist | Song | Notes |
|---|---|---|
| Cher | "Believe" | US No. 1, UK No. 1 |
| Cher | "Strong Enough" | US dance No. 1, UK No. 5 |
| Cher | "All Or Nothing" | US dance No. 1, UK No. 12 |
| Cher | "Dov'è l'amore" | US dance No. 5, UK No. 21 |
| Cher | "The Music's No Good Without You" | UK No. 8 |
| Cher | "Song for the Lonely" | US dance No. 1 |
| Enrique Iglesias | "Bailamos" | US No. 1, UK No. 4 |
| Enrique Iglesias | "Be With You" | US No. 1 |
| Enrique Iglesias | "Hero" | US No. 3, UK No. 1 |
| Enrique Iglesias | "Rhythm Divine" | US No. 32 |
| Enrique Iglesias | "Love to See You Cry" | UK No. 12 |
| Enrique Iglesias | "To Love a Woman" | featuring Lionel Richie |
| Enrique Iglesias | "Not in Love" | featuring Kelis, US dance No. 1, UK No. 5 |
| Enrique Iglesias | Addicted" | UK No. 11 |
| Lionel Richie | "Angel" | |
| Lionel Richie | "Just for You" | |
| James Bay | "Let It Go" | US No. 16, UK No.10 |
| Lara Fabian | "I Will Love Again" | US No. 32, US dance No. 1 |
| James Morrison | "You Make It Real" | UK No. 7 |
| Bryan McFadden and Delta Goodrem | "Almost Here" | UK No. 3, AUS No. 1 |
| Lemar | "Someone Should Tell You" | UK No. 11 |
| Craig David | "Unbelievable" | UK No. 18 |
| Celine Dion | "Stand by Your Side" | |
| Natalie Bassingthwaighte | "Someday Soon" | AUS No. 7 |
| The Tamperer | "Hammer to the Heart" | UK No. 6 |
| Gina G | "Fresh!" | UK No. 6 |
| Gina G | "Ti Amo" | UK No. 11 |
| Rod Stewart | "Don't Come Around Here" | featuring Helicopter Girl |
| Emma Bunton | "Baby Please Don't Stop" | |
| Emma Bunton | "Too Many Teardrops" | |

== Awards ==
- ASCAP PRS, Writer of the year 2000
- ASCAP PRS, Song of the year 1999 "Believe"
- ASCAP PRS, Song of the year 2002 "Hero"
- IVOR NOVELLO, Best Song musically/lyrically 1998 "Believe"
- IVOR NOVELLO, Best Selling UK single 1998 "Believe"
- IVOR NOVELLO, International Hit of the year 1998 "Believe"
- Nominated – IVOR NOVELLO, International Hit of year 2001 "Hero"
- Nominated – IVOR NOVELLO, Best Selling UK single 2002 "Hero"
- Grammy Awards, Best Dance Recording 2000 "Believe"
- Nominated, Best Dance Recording 2001 "Be with You"
- Nominated, Best Dance Recording 2002 "Angel"
