= Michelle Lewis =

American singer-songwriter

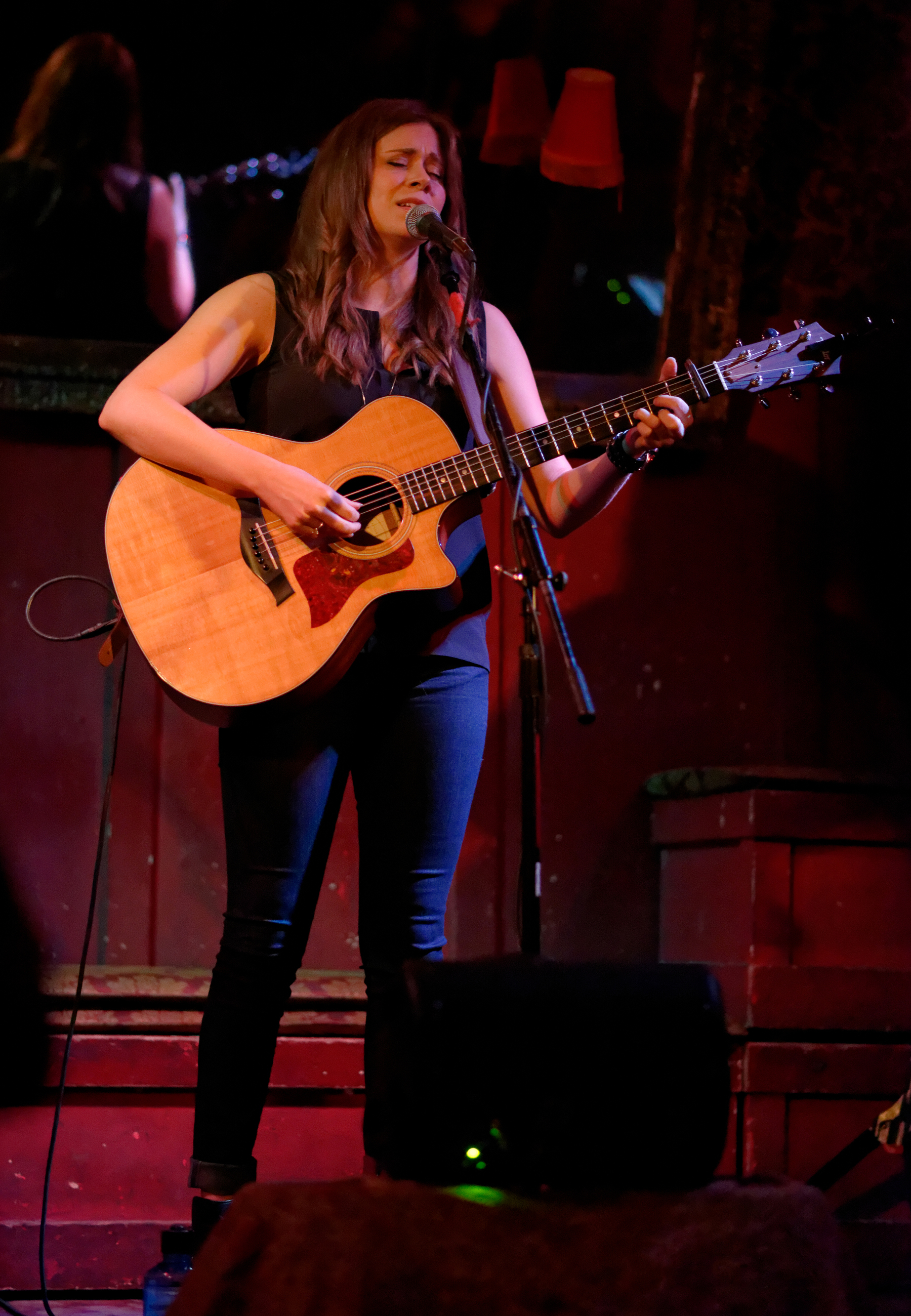
- Lewis in 2014

Background information
- Born: July 14, 1968 (age 58); New York City, New York, US
- Occupations: Singer; songwriter; composer; actress
- Instrument: Vocals
- Years active: 1994–present
- Labels: Giant Records; Kismet Records
- Website: www.michellelewissongs.com

Michelle Robin Lewis (born July 14, 1968) is a singer-songwriter from United States who has released two solo albums. She has since worked as a songwriter for artists including Cher, Shawn Colvin, Hilary Duff, Kay Hanley and Kelly Osbourne.

== Biography ==
Michelle Lewis was born in New York City to saxophonist Morty Lewis and Annette Sanders (née Benbasset), a session singer for radio and TV jingles. As a child, she was a jingle singer and also a regular on Sesame Street. She was raised in River Vale, New Jersey.

Lewis began performing with emerging downtown NY bands such as Blues Traveler and Spin Doctors while she attended Columbia University as a religion and psychology major. After graduation, Lewis was hired by jazz label GRP Records as a production coordinator; she then signed a publishing deal with BMG Music in 1994 for songs she was writing for her band, The Jazzhole, which was signed to Bluemoon/Atlantic Records in 1994.

While with BMG, she also wrote singles for other artists including Amy Grant and Todd Terry. "Deeper Shade of Love," a song she co-wrote for Trinidadian singer Camille Rodwell, earned a Juno Award for Dance Recording of the Year at the Juno Awards of 1996, and Australian pop star Deni Hines won an ARIA Award for Breakthrough Artist for Lewis' song "It's Alright" at the 1996 ARIA Music Awards.

Lewis signed with Giant Records as a solo artist and released her debut album, Little Leviathan, in 1998. The single "Nowhere and Everywhere" charted in Billboard and was featured on the soundtrack of the film Practical Magic. In the summer of 1998, she appeared on some dates of the Lilith Fair tour.

Lewis' second album, Letters Out Loud, was released in 2001 on Kismet Records. Relocating to Los Angeles, she joined with other women singer-songwriters, forming the ad hoc group The Dilettantes and a postmodern Andrews Sisters-style trio, The Goods. Lewis also continued to write songs for other artists, including a co-writing credit on "A Different Kind of Love Song," a No. 1 dance-pop single for Cher in 2002.

In 2006, Lewis and Jill Sobule formed The Broadband with Kay Hanley to record and release “God Save the Internet”, a song to raise awareness of and support net neutrality, an issue then facing corporate opposition and pending legislation in Congress. The song was part of a nationwide grassroots effort by the Save the Internet Coalition. From 2006 to 2009, Lewis and Sobule formalized their collaboration as "The Provocateurs", contributing commentary, opinions, and original topical and political songs to their Provocateurs blog on Yahoo! Music and to the Huffington Post blog.

In 2008, Lewis and her husband, Dan Petty, co-wrote songs with Lisa Loeb for the children's album Camp Lisa, and performed on the album. More recently, Lewis is known for creating music for the Disney Jr show Doc McStuffins, which aired for five seasons, and for which she won a Peabody Award in 2015. She also received her first Emmy nomination in 2015, at the 42nd Daytime Creative Arts Emmy Awards for Outstanding Original Song, as the composer of "Holiday Ride" for the Nickelodeon show Bubble Guppies.

While she continues to perform with The Goods, write songs for pop radio and compose for kids’ television, Lewis' experience as a working songwriter led her and some long-time collaborators (Kay Hanley, Shelly Peiken and Pam Sheyne) to found Songwriters of North America (SONA) – a Los Angeles-based organization of professional songwriters and composers who advocate for upholding the value of their work in the digital future.

== Discography ==
=== Solo ===
Year	Album	Artist	Role
2004	This Time Around	Michelle Lewis	Vocals, guitar, composer, co-producer (with ZOUX)
2001	Letters Out Loud	Michelle Lewis	Vocals, guitar, composer, producer
1998	Little Leviathan	Michelle Lewis	Vocals, guitar, composer, producer
1994	The Jazzhole	Jazzhole	Songwriter, performer

=== Film ===
Year	Film	Role
2021	The Loud House Movie	Composer, performer, songwriter
2006	Charlotte's Web	Composer
2006	Bambi II	Composer, performer
2004	A Cinderella Story	Songwriter
1998	Practical Magic	Performer, songwriter

=== Television ===
Year	Show	Role
2019	DC Super Hero Girls	Songwriter
2018	Muppet Babies	Songwriter
2016	The Loud House	Composer
2013	Shake It Up	Composer
2013	Doc McStuffins	Composer
2008	Ruby and the Rockits	Composer
2007	The Hills	Composer
2006	That's So Raven Too!	Composer
1998	Touched by an Angel	Composer

=== Vocals ===
Year	Album	Artist	Role
2015	Ghost Notes	Veruca Salt	Vocals
2012	Merry Christmas, Baby	Rod Stewart	Choir
2012	The Party Starts Now (From Disney's Club Penguin)	DJ Cadence	Vocals
2010	Hooked!	Lucy Woodward	Vocals
2003	Kids in America	American Juniors	Vocals
2002	Citizen Cope	Citizen Cope	Vocals
1996	The Beat is the Bomb	Jazzhole	Vocals
1995	And The Feeling Goes Round	Jazzhole	Vocals
1994	Bullets Over Broadway	Original Soundtrack	Vocals

=== Selected songwriting discography ===
Year	Album – "Song"	Artist	Role
2024	Super Magick — "This Time"	Better Than Ezra	Songwriter
2015	Sometime Last Night – "What You're Missing"	R5	Songwriter
2012	DNA – "Wings"	Little Mix	Songwriter
2010	Il Volo – "This Time"	Il Volo	Songwriter
2010	Christmas Is the Time to Say I Love You – "It's Not Christmas Without You"	Katherine McPhee	Songwriter
2009	Paper Empire – "Bright Lights"	Better Than Ezra	Songwriter
2009	Mitchell Musso – "Odd Man Out"	Mitchell Musso	Songwriter
2009	Echo (Crooked Crown) – "Where Do I Begin"	Maia Sharp	Songwriter
2008	Camp Lisa – "Going Away", "Wake Up Song", "Best Friend", "When It Rains", "It's Not Goodbye"	Lisa Loeb	Songwriter, producer, vocals
2007	Noise From Words – "No Words", "All My Love"	Michael McDermott	Songwriter
2007	Inside Out – "High"	Emmy Rossum	Songwriter
2007	Broken and Beautiful – "Broken and Beautiful"	Suzie McNeil	Songwriter
2006	Sunday Love – "Get You Off", "Hole"	Fefe Dobson	Songwriter
2005	Traveling Light – "Traveling Light", "Hanalei Road", "Love Song (For Everyone)"	Courtney Jaye	Songwriter
2005	A Little More Personal (Raw) – "My Beautiful Life"	Lindsay Lohan	Songwriter
2003	Shut Up – "Come Dig Me Out"	Kelly Osbourne	Songwriter
2002	Living Proof – "A Different Kind of Love Song"	Cher	Songwriter
1998	Remix Your Imagination – "It's Alright"	Deni Hines	Songwriter, vocals
1997	Ready for a New Day – "Live Without You" (featuring Jocelyn Brown)	Todd Terry	Songwriter
1997	Behind the Eyes – "I Will Be Your Friend"	Amy Grant	Songwriter, vocals
1997	Before the Rain – "Think About Me" (featuring Basil Reynolds)	Eternal	Songwriter
1996	Songs of the Letter People	Various	Vocalist
