= Johan Åberg =

Swedish music producer, songwriter, and manager

- Born: Johan Ludvig Åberg; 17 April 1972 (age 54)
- Origin: Stockholm, Sweden
- Genres: Pop, pop rock, rock
- Occupations: Songwriter, producer
- Years active: 1985–present
- Website: www.abergmusic.se

Johan Åberg (born 17 April 1972) is a Swedish music producer, songwriter, and manager. In the late 1990s and early 2000s, he wrote and produced several international hit songs with artists like Christina Aguilera ("Come on Over Baby") and Cher ("A Different Kind of Love Song"). Aside from writing and producing music he was also the manager of, among others, Swedish singer/songwriter Ulrik Munther. Ulrik placed third in the Swedish qualifier for the Eurovision Song Contest, Melodifestivalen 2012, with the song "Soldiers" which Åberg co-wrote and co-produced.

== Musical career ==
Åberg grew up in the northern Stockholm suburb Stocksund and started his musical career as a guitarist in rock bands as a teenager. He attended music high school (gymnasium) at Södra Latin and later studied fine arts at Konstskolan and Konstskolan Basis in Stockholm. Parallel to his education he left his band and started focusing more on songwriting for other artists, and started the production company Eclectic Music with Anders Hansson in 1998.

When he was paired up with the songwriter Paul Rein the two co-wrote songs that would become international hits and best-sellers with then largely unknown artists Christina Aguilera and Jessica Simpson. Come On Over Baby became the fourth single from Aguileras self-titled debut album and hit number one on the U.S. Billboard Hot 100. Billboard ranked Christina Aguilera at number 23 on the magazine's Top 200 Albums of the Decade and the album has sold over 17 million copies worldwide. They also co-wrote "I've Got My Eyes On You" which was released on Jessica Simpson's debut album Sweet Kisses that peaked at #25 on U.S. Billboard 200 and was certified 2× Platinum in the U.S.

In 2002 he co-wrote and co-produced "A Different Kind of Love Song" that was released by Cher on her 2002 album Living Proof. The song reached #1 on Billboards Hot Dance Club Songs, and as of May 2007, the album Living Proof sold 500,000 copies in the United States, according to Nielsen SoundScan. In the early 2000s he also co-wrote hit songs recorded by artists such as French girl band L5 and Chinese pop star Wei Wei.

Åberg worked as the manager of young Swedish singer/songwriter Ulrik Munther who he discovered in Lilla Melodifestivalen. Under the management of Åberg, Ulrik Munther came in second in Metro Music Challenge 2009, made a well-known cover of Lady Gaga's "Born This Way" and came third in Melodifestivalen 2012 with "Soldiers" which was also co-written and co-produced by Åberg.

== Current business ==
Åberg is currently running the digital agency A26 Media AB.
