= Cher videography =

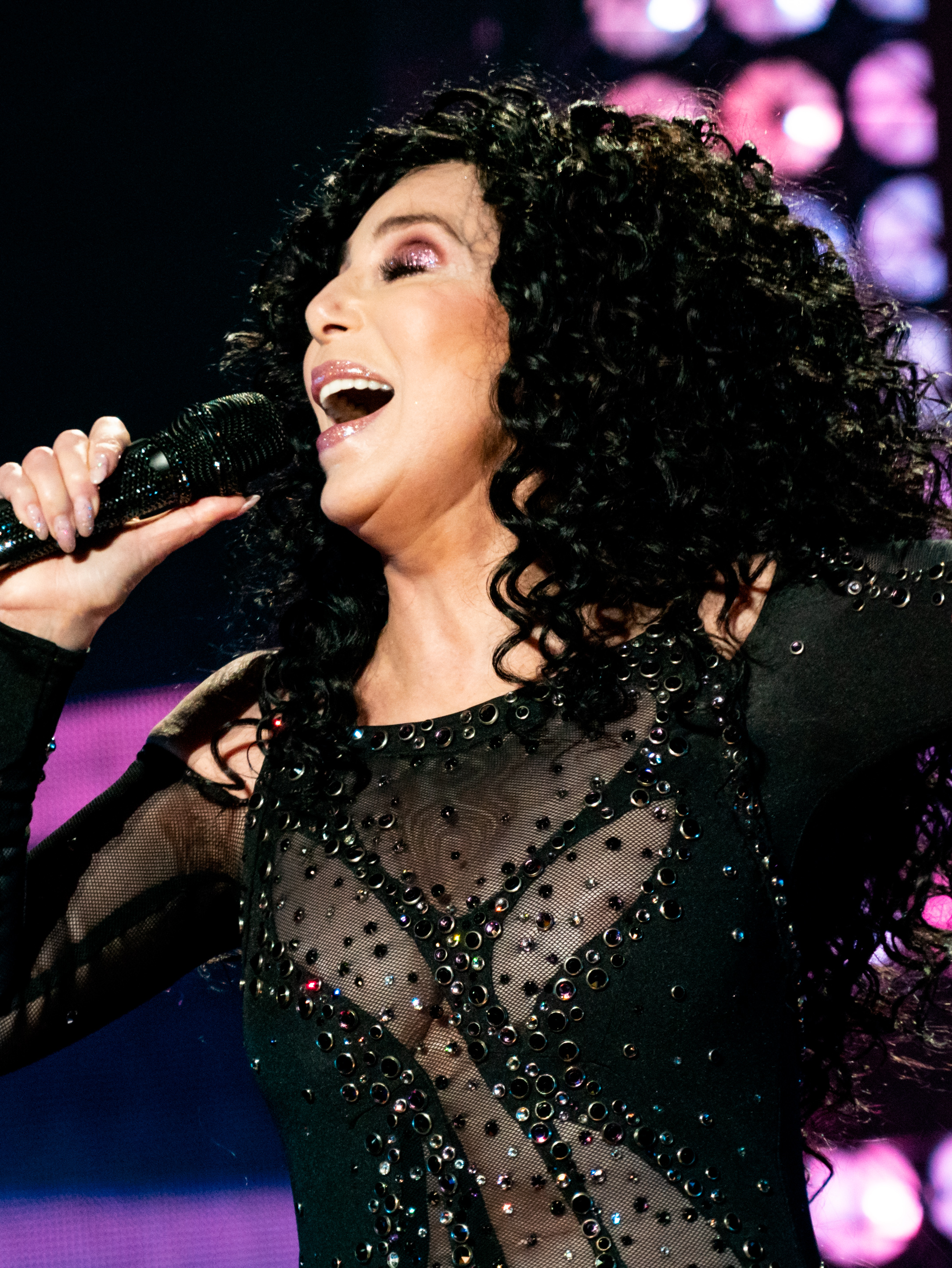
- Cher performing on the Here We Go Again Tour, 2019
- Music videos: 33
- Concert tour videos: 3
- Music video compilations: 2
- Fitness videos: 2

American singer-actress Cher has released numerous music video titles since 1989 on VHS, LaserDisc, VCD and DVD. These listings include the official international videography, some titles and formats were only released in certain countries such as North America or the UK. Cher has also appeared on DVD releases for VH1 Divas live concerts Divas Live '99, Divas 2002.

This list includes a comprehensive listing of official music video releases by Cher. Cher was ranked #17 on VH1's "50 Greatest Women of The Video Era" list.

== Music videos ==
Year	Title	Album	Director(s)	Ref(s)
1973	"Half-Breed"	Half-Breed	Art Fisher	
1974	"Dark Lady"	Dark Lady	Art Fisher	
1979	"Take Me Home"	Take Me Home	Art Fisher	
1979	"Love & Pain"	Take Me Home	Art Fisher	
1979	"Hell on Wheels"	Prisoner	Roger Flint	
1981	"Dead Ringer for Love" (with Meat Loaf)	Dead Ringer	Allan F. Nicholls	
1987	"I Found Someone"	Cher	Cher	
1988	"We All Sleep Alone"	Cher	Cher	
1988	"Main Man"	Cher	Cher	
1989	"If I Could Turn Back Time"	Heart of Stone	Marty Callner	
1989	"Heart of Stone"	Heart of Stone	Marty Callner	
1990	"The Shoop Shoop Song (It's in His Kiss)"	Love Hurts / Mermaids (OST)	Marty Callner	
1991	"Love and Understanding"	Love Hurts	Marty Callner	
1991	"Save Up All Your Tears"	Love Hurts	Matt Mahurin	
1993	"Many Rivers to Cross" (Live)	Greatest Hits: 1965–1992	Marty Callner	
1993	"I Got You Babe" (with Beavis and Butt-head)	The Beavis and Butt-Head Experience	Tamra Davis & Yvette Kaplan	
1995	"Love Can Build a Bridge" (with Chrissie Hynde, Neneh Cherry and Eric Clapton)	Non-album single	—N/a	
1995	"Walking in Memphis"	It's a Man's World	Marcus Nispel	
1996	"One by One"	It's a Man's World	Marcus Nispel	
1998	"Believe"	Believe	Nigel Dick	
1999	"Strong Enough"	Believe	Nigel Dick	
1999	"All or Nothing"	Believe	David Mallet	
1999	"Dov'è l'amore"	Believe	Jamie O'Connor	
2001	"Più che puoi" (with Eros Ramazzotti)	Stilelibero	Dani Jacobs	
2001	"The Music's No Good Without You"	Living Proof	Nigel Dick	
2002	"Alive Again"	Living Proof	—N/a	
2002	"Song for the Lonely"	Living Proof	Stu Maschwitz	
2011	"You Haven't Seen the Last of Me"	Burlesque (OST)	Steve Antin	
2011	"Welcome To Burlesque"	Burlesque (OST)	Steve Antin	
2013	"Woman's World"	Closer to the Truth	Ray Kay	
2014	"I Walk Alone"	Closer to the Truth	—N/a	
2018	"SOS"	Dancing Queen	Jake Wilson	
2020	"Chiquitita" (Spanish version)	—N/a	Unknown	

=== Second versions ===
Second versions were created for some videos. While some are almost identical, some are completely different.

Year	Title	Album	Director(s)
1971	"Gypsys, Tramps & Thieves"	Gypsys, Tramps & Thieves	—N/a
1974	"Dark Lady" (Cartoon)	Dark Lady	—N/a
1988	"I Found Someone" (Concert version)	Cher	—N/a
1988	"We All Sleep Alone"	Cher	—N/a
1989	"If I Could Turn Back Time" (Alternative version)	Heart of Stone	Marty Callner
1989	"Heart of Stone" (Director's cut)	Heart of Stone	Marty Callner
1990	"The Shoop Shoop Song (It's in His Kiss)" (Alternative version)	Love Hurts / Mermaids (OST)	Marty Callner
1996	"One By One" (Director's cut)	It's A Man's World	Marcus Nispel
1998	"Believe" (Director's cut)	Believe	Nigel Dick
1999	"Dov'è l'amore" (Album version)	Believe	Jamie O'Connor
2002	"A Song For The Lonely" (Director's cut)	Living Proof	Stu Maschwitz
2013	"Woman's World" (Director's cut)	Closer to the Truth	Ray Kay

=== Remix videos ===
Year	Title	Album	Remix director(s)
1996	"One by One (Junior Vasquez Vocal Edit)"; Remix used: Junior Vasquez Vocal Edit	It's a Man's World	Dan-O-Rama
1996	"One by One (Dance Remix)"; Remix used: North American "One by One" edit	It's a Man's World	Dan-O-Rama
1999	"Believe (Almighty Remix)"; Remix used: Almighty Definitive Mix	Believe	Dan-O-Rama
1999	"Believe (Club 69 Remix)"; Remix used: Club 69 Phunk Club Mix	Believe	Dan-O-Rama
1999	"Strong Enough (Vocal Club Edit)"; Remix used: Pumpin' Dolls Vocal Epic Club	Believe	Dan-O-Rama
1999	"All or Nothing (Almighty Remix)"; Remix used: Almighty Definitive Mix	Believe	Dan-O-Rama
1999	"Dov'è l'amore" Remix used: Emilio Estefan Jr. Radio Edit	Believe	Dan-O-Rama
1999	"Do You Believe? Tour intro video" Remix used: Strong Enough (Club 69 Future Anthem Mix)	Live in Concert	Dan-O-Rama
2000	"Strong Enough (Club 69 Future Anthem Edit)"; Remix used: Strong Enough (Club 69 Future Anthem Edit)*[Promo]	Believe	Dan-O-Rama
2001	"The Music's No Good Without You (Almighty Remix)"; Remix used: Almighty Radio Edit	Living Proof	Warner Bros. Records
2002	"Song for the Lonely (Almighty Remix)"; Remix used: Almighty Radio Edit	Living Proof	Dan-O-Rama
2002	"Song for the Lonely (Thunderpuss Remix)"; Remix used: Thunderpuss Club Mix Radio Edit	Living Proof	Dan-O-Rama
2003	"Living Proof: The Farewell Tour intro video" Remix used: If I Could Turn Back Time (Almighty Remix)	The Farewell Tour	Dan-O-Rama
2003	"If I Could Turn Back Time (2003 Out to Sea Edit)"; Song used: If I Could Turn Back Time (live)	The Farewell Tour	Dan-O-Rama
2003	"Believe (Wayne G. Remix)"; Song used: unknown [Unofficial]	Believe	Dan-O-Rama

=== Video albums ===
Title	Video details	Peak chart positions											Certifications
Title	Video details	US	AUS	AUT	BEL	DEN	HUN	NLD	NZ	POR	SWE	UK	Certifications
Extravaganza: Live at the Mirage^{[L]}	Released: 1992; Label: Sony BMG, EV Classics; Formats: VHS, Laserdisc, DVD	3	23	—	—	—	—	—	—	—	13	2	
The Video Collection^{[M]}	Released: 1993; Label: Geffen Records; Formats: VHS, Laserdisc	—	—	—	—	—	—	—	—	—	—	2	
Live in Concert	Released: 1999; Label: HBO Home Video; Formats: VHS, DVD	6	7	—	—	2	20	—	—	—	2	3	ARG: 2× Platinum; AUS: 2× Platinum; BRA: Platinum; UK: Platinum
The Farewell Tour	Released: 2003; Label: Image Entertainment; Formats: VHS, DVD	1	1	8	7	5	7	18	2	3	2	1	US: 3× Platinum; AUS: 8× Platinum; GER: Gold; NZ: Platinum; POR: Silver; SWE: Gold; UK: Platinum
The Very Best of Cher: The Video Hits Collection	Released: 2004; Label: Warner Music Vision; Formats: VHS, DVD	3	4	—	—	—	—	18	—	—	10	3	US: Platinum; AUS: Platinum
"—" denotes items that did not chart or were not released.

== Fitness videos ==
Title	Video details	Peak chart positions	
Title	Video details	US	UK
CherFitness: A New Attitude	Released: 1991 / 2005; Label: 20th Century Fox Home Entertainment; Formats: VHS, Laserdisc, DVD	1	2
CherFitness: Body Confidence	Released: 1992 / 2005; Label: 20th Century Fox Home Entertainment; Formats: VHS, Laserdisc, DVD	2	1

== See also ==
- List of best-selling music artists
- List of artists who reached number one on the Hot 100 (U.S.)
- List of number-one dance hits (United States)
- List of artists who reached number one on the U.S. Dance chart
