= Extravaganza: Live at the Mirage =

Video by Cher
- Released: June 9, 1992 (VHS); February 4, 1991 (CBS); 2005 (DVD)
- Recorded: 1990
- Genre: Live
- Length: 60 mins
- Labels: Sony BMG, EV Classics

Cher chronology
CherFitness: Body Confidence (1992)	Extravaganza: Live at the Mirage (1992)	The Video Collection (1993)

Extravaganza: Live at the Mirage is the first live music video title by singer and actress Cher. Released by Sony BMG in 1992, it contained footage from Cher's two Heart of Stone Tour specials filmed at Mirage Hotel in Las Vegas in 1990. It featured tracks from the Cher and Heart of Stone albums alongside various covers.

== Formats ==
The show was originally broadcast on CBS as a TV special titled Cher... at the Mirage on February 4, 1991. It was then released on VHS and LaserDisc the following year. In UK the VHS version has an alternative opening, the same opening used on tour. The CBS Broadcast version was finally released on DVD in 2005 with many extras and further bonus songs that did not make the broadcast but were included on the VHS version.

== Track listing ==
VHS version

1. "I'm No Angel"
2. "Hold On"
3. "We All Sleep Alone"
4. "Bang Bang"
5. "I Found Someone"
6. "Perfection"
7. "Tougher Than the Rest"
8. "After All"
9. "Take It to the Limit"
10. "If I Could Turn Back Time"
11. "Many Rivers to Cross"
12. "The Fire Down Below"
13. "Takin' It to the Streets"

DVD version

Live at the Mirage
No.	Title	Length
1.	"Opening / After All"
2.	"I'm No Angel"
3.	"We All Sleep Alone"
4.	"Bang Bang (My Baby Shot Me Down)"
5.	"I Found Someone"
6.	"Take It to the Limit"
7.	"If I Could Turn Back Time"
8.	"Perfection"
9.	"The Fire Down Below"
10.	"Takin' It to the Streets"
11.	"After All"
12.	"End Credits"

Bonus Songs
No.	Title	Length
13.	"Hold On"
14.	"Many Rivers to Cross"
15.	"Tougher Than the Rest"

Extras
No.	Title	Length
16.	"Alternate Opening"
17.	"Cher's Big Blooper"
18.	"Backstage Home Movies With Cher Commentary"
19.	"I Survived the 1990 Tour"
20.	"Heart of Stone"
21.	"Photo Gallery"

Bonus Performances (multi-angle)
No.	Title	Length
22.	"Cher at the Mirage"
23.	"Cher's Rehearsal"
24.	"Cher on Tour"

== Other information ==
"Hold On", "Many Rivers to Cross" and "Tougher Than The Rest" were the bonus songs in the DVD. The show shown on the DVD release also uses different angles and shots in various places compared to the original VHS release.

== See also ==
- Cher: Music video and DVD videography
- Heart of Stone Tour
- Live at the Mirage
