= The Video Collection (Cher video) =

Video by Cher
- Released: 8 March 1993
- Recorded: 1967–1992
- Genre: Greatest Hits Compilation
- Length: 45 mins
- Label: Geffen Records

Cher chronology
Extravaganza: Live at the Mirage (1992)	The Video Collection (1993)	Live in Concert (1999)

The Video Collection is the first commercially released greatest videos compilation by singer-actress Cher. It was released by Geffen Records only in the UK c. 1993 and Brazil in 1993 by BMG Record to promote Cher's first European compilation Greatest Hits: 1965-1992.

== Formats ==
The Video Collection was initially released on VHS in 1993 and in Laserdisc in Germany. It also contains several music videos that are absent from Cher's subsequent music video compilation on videocassette.

== Track listing ==
1. "The Shoop Shoop Song" (alternative version)
2. "If I Could Turn Back Time"
3. "Save Up All Your Tears"
4. "Love and Understanding"
5. "Heart of Stone (director's cut)
6. "Main Man"
7. "We All Sleep Alone"
8. "I Found Someone"
9. "Dead Ringer for Love"
10. "Many Rivers to Cross" (live from The Mirage)
11. "I Got You Babe" (with Sonny on Top of Pops)

== Promotional video ==
In 1993, the live performance of "Many Rivers to Cross" was released as a limited edition VHS Single by MCA.

== See also ==
- Cher: Music video and DVD videography
