= The Very Best of Cher: The Video Hits Collection =

2004 video album

Video by Cher
- Released: June 22, 2004
- Length: 57:00
- Label: Warner Bros.

Cher chronology
The Farewell Tour (2003)	The Very Best of Cher: The Video Hits Collection (2004)

The Very Best of Cher: The Video Hits Collection is a 2004 video compilation by American singer Cher. It contains 15 music videos spanning Cher's career and was released on VHS and DVD by Warner Bros. and Rhino Entertainment.

== Critical reception ==
Professional ratings
Review scores
Source	Rating
Get Ready to Rock!	4/5 stars
People	3/4 stars
Times & Transcript	3/5 stars

People wrote that "this set shows why Cher is a diva worthy of one-name status". The Boston Globe criticized Cher's direction of the collection's four videos, saying she "should not be allowed anywhere behind a camera", but praised the "most captivating moments", particularly "If I Could Turn Back Time", the "intriguing" "Walking in Memphis" and the "amazing" "Half Breed", adding that "all other video sins are quickly forgiven" upon seeing Cher "in a Bob Mackie feather headdress atop a horse". Goldmine praised the DVD as a showcase for Cher's visual appeal, saying that she is "truly in her element" in the video medium and describing her as an "exotic and mesmerizing visual presence" who is "a far more interesting attraction than any of the models or extras"; the critic considered Cher "at her visual best" when the videos avoid "anything too heavy" and concluded that the collection demonstrates "just how well-suited Cher is to the video medium", since "she barely has to move and she'll have you transfixed".

The Times & Transcript highlighted Cher as "one of the first pop stars to recognize the impact of music videos", noting that she began making them "long before others got on board" and praising the collection for covering "virtually all phases of her career" through its 16 videos. Get Ready to Rock! described the collection as "a mixed bunch" of videos, praising the "big budget eye candy" and highlighting "If I Could Turn Back Time" as "a scorching video" that is "outrageous"; the critic also noted Cher's effective use of her image, saying that the videos "may not be subtle, but it works", while describing the "typically 'glossy'" video for "Believe" and observing that while some of the earlier clips now look "dated", they " they do let you play the 'spot the plastic surgery' game".

== Track listing ==
1. "Believe"
2. "If I Could Turn Back Time"
3. "Save Up All Your Tears"
4. "Walking in Memphis"
5. "One by One" (Dance Remix)
6. "Main Man"
7. "I Found Someone"
8. "Strong Enough"
9. "Song for the Lonely" (Almighty Remix)
10. "Half-Breed"
11. "We All Sleep Alone"
12. "Heart of Stone"
13. "The Shoop Shoop Song (It's in His Kiss)"
14. "Dov'è L'Amore"
15. "Love Can Build a Bridge" (with Chrissie Hynde, Neneh Cherry & Eric Clapton)

== Certifications ==
Region	Certification	Certified units/sales
Australia (ARIA)	Platinum	15,000^{^}
United States (RIAA)	Platinum	100,000^{^}
^{^} Shipments figures based on certification alone.

== See also ==
- Cher: Music video and DVD videography
