= Patricia Darcy Jones =

American actress

- Darcy-Jones in Waitress! 1982
- Born: Patricia Darcy; April 2, 1953; Orange, New Jersey, United States
- Died: June 16, 2007 (aged 54); Hopatcong, New Jersey, United States
- Occupations: Singer, vocalist, actor

Patricia Darcy-Jones (April 2, 1953 – June 16, 2007) was an American rock singer, vocalist and Broadway actress.

== Personal life ==
Darcy-Jones was one of four children born to Helen and Eugene Darcy Sr. She married Courtney Jones, whom she met on one of Cher's tours in 1989. He used to engage her in casual conversation as the sound crew set up, which "snowballed itself into more of a relationship" according to Jones.

== Career ==
=== Film ===
- Waitress! (1981) — on-screen performer ("Dancin' Tonight"); soundtrack performer ("All Night Long")
- For the Boys (1991)

=== Broadway ===
- Leader of the Pack (1985)
- Beehive (1986–1987)
- Smokey Joe's Cafe (1995–2000)

=== Television ===
- Cher: Live in Concert (HBO, 1999) — backing vocalist
- Cher: The Farewell Tour (NBC, 2003) — backing vocalist

=== Music ===
- Waitress! (1981) — soundtrack performer ("All Night Long")
- Do You Believe? Tour (Cher, 1999–2000) — backing vocalist
- Living Proof: The Farewell Tour (Cher, 2002–2005) — backing vocalist
