= The Farewell Tour (video) =

2003 concert film by Cher

Video by Cher
- Released: April 8, 2003 (NBC); August 26, 2003 (VHS/DVD)
- Recorded: November 8, 2002
- Venues: American Airlines Arena in Miami, Florida
- Genre: Live
- Length: 92 mins
- Label: Warner Bros.
- Director: David Mallet
- Producers: Dione Orrom, Paul Morphos

Cher chronology
Live in Concert (1999)	The Farewell Tour (2003)	The Very Best of Cher: The Video Hits Collection (2004)

The Farewell Tour is a 2003 concert film featuring American singer Cher. It documents a performance from Living Proof: The Farewell Tour, filmed at American Airlines Arena in Miami, Florida, on November 8, 2002. The performance was broadcast as a television special on NBC on April 8, 2003, which attracted more than 17 million viewers. The special won three Primetime Emmy Awards, including Outstanding Variety, Music or Comedy Special. The same performance was also released as the live album Live! The Farewell Tour.

== Formats ==
- CD — CD case edition packed with the live CD.
- DVD — DVD Digipack and Amaray Case in some countries packed with the DVD.

== Track listing ==
The Farewell Tour
No.	Title	Length
1.	"Opening"	1:43
2.	"I Still Haven't Found What I'm Looking For"	4:16
3.	"Song for the Lonely"	7:05
4.	"Gayatri Mantra"	3:24
5.	"All or Nothing"	3:54
6.	"I Found Someone"	6:21
7.	"Bang Bang (My Baby Shot Me Down)"	5:25
8.	"Sonny & Cher Medley" ("The Beat Goes On" / "Baby Don't Go" / "I Got You Babe")	2:54
9.	"All I Really Want to Do" (medley part 1)	2:01
10.	"Half-Breed" (medley part 2)	1:33
11.	"Gypsies, Tramps & Thieves" (medley part 3)	1:30
12.	"Dark Lady" (medley part 4)	3:32
13.	"Take Me Home"	4:41
14.	"The Way of Love"	7:29
15.	"After All" (duet with Paul Mirkovich)	4:58
16.	"Just Like Jesse James"	7:01
17.	"Heart of Stone"	4:03
18.	"The Shoop Shoop Song (It's in His Kiss)"	2:22
19.	"Strong Enough"	3:00
20.	"If I Could Turn Back Time"	5:44
21.	"Believe"	6:20
22.	"End Credits"	2:12

Bonus Features
No.	Title	Length
23.	"Save Up All Your Tears"	3:41
24.	"We All Sleep Alone"	3:28
25.	"A Different Kind of Love Song"	3:37
26.	"Behind the Scenes Documentary"	24:33
27.	"Meet the Team"	5:20
28.	"Monologue 1"	5:26
29.	"Monologue 2"	1:22
30.	"Costume Designs Still Gallery"	9:00
31.	"If I Could Turn Back Time" (music video [2003 Re-Edit])	5:04
32.	"Cher's Special Version of West Side Story"	12:44

== Production credits ==
- Director: David Mallet
- Producers: Dione Orrom and Paul Morphos
- Executive Producers: Cher, Roger Davies and Lindsay Scott
- Executive Producer for Serpent Film: Rocky Oldham
- Tour Director: Doriana Sanchez
- Choreography: Doriana Sanchez and Bubba Carr

== Certifications ==
Region	Certification	Certified units/sales
Australia (ARIA)	8× Platinum	120,000^{^}
Germany (BVMI)	Gold	25,000^{^}
New Zealand (RMNZ)	Platinum	5,000^{^}
Portugal (AFP)	Silver	
Sweden (GLF)	Gold	10,000^{^}
United Kingdom (BPI)	Platinum	50,000^{*}
United States (RIAA)	3× Platinum	300,000^{^}
^{*} Sales figures based on certification alone.^{^} Shipments figures based on certification alone.
