= Live in Concert (video) =

Video by Cher
- Released: December 6, 1999 (UK); December 21, 1999 (US)
- Recorded: August 28, 1999
- Venue: MGM Grand Garden Arena (Paradise, Nevada)
- Genre: Live, Pop Rock
- Length: 75 mins (VHS); 90 mins (DVD)
- Label: HBO

Cher chronology
| The Video Collection (1993) | Live in Concert (1999) | The Farewell Tour (2003) |

Live in Concert is the second live music video title by singer and actress Cher. Released by HBO in 1999, it contained footage from Cher's Do You Believe? Tour specials filmed at the MGM Grand Garden Arena in Paradise, Nevada in 1999. It featured tracks from her many of studio albums, such as Gypsys, Tramps & Thieves and Believe album, alongside various covers.

The video was certified Platinum in the UK and Brazil, and 2× Platinum in Australia.

== Formats ==
It was released on VHS and DVD. The special features on the DVD include a photo gallery, a little Cher biography, the costume designs and the full stage projections.

== Track listing ==
1. "I Still Haven't Found What I'm Looking For"
2. "All or Nothing"
3. "The Power"
4. "We All Sleep Alone"
5. "I Found Someone"
6. "The Way of Love"
7. "Half-Breed"
8. "Gypsies, Tramps and Thieves"
9. "Dark Lady"
10. "Take Me Home"
11. "After All"
12. "Walking in Memphis"
13. "Just Like Jesse James"
14. "The Shoop Shoop Song (It's in His Kiss)"
15. "Dov'è L'Amore"
16. "Strong Enough"
17. "If I Could Turn Back Time"
18. "Believe"

== Promotional video ==
The music video of "All or Nothing" was released by Warner Bros. Records to promote the DVD. This video is a montage of a newly recorded performance of the song (with straight red wig) and clips of various other performances from the DVD recorded at the MGM, but the audio is the "All or Nothing" (Metro Radio Mix).

== Certifications ==
| Region | Certification | Certified units/sales |
|---|---|---|
| Argentina (CAPIF) | Platinum | 8,000^{^} |
| Australia (ARIA) | 2× Platinum | 30,000^{^} |
| Brazil (Pro-Música Brasil) | Platinum | 50,000^{*} |
| United Kingdom (BPI) | Platinum | 50,000^{*} |
^{*} Sales figures based on certification alone.^{^} Shipments figures based on certification alone.

== See also ==
- Do You Believe? Tour
