= Do You Believe? (tour) =

1999–2000 concert tour by Cher

Do You Believe? Tour
- Concert tour by Cher
- Location: Europe • North America
- Associated album: Believe
- Start date: June 16, 1999
- End date: March 4, 2000
- Legs: 3
- No. of shows: 41 in Europe; 80 in North America; 121 total
- Attendance: 939,848
- Box office: US$80 million

Cher concert chronology
- Love Hurts Tour (1991–92); Do You Believe? Tour (1999–2000); Living Proof: The Farewell Tour (2002–05)

Do You Believe? Tour, also known as the Believe Tour, was the fourth solo concert tour by American singer-actress Cher. The tour, which took place in 1999 and 2000, promoted her album, Believe.

== History ==
The tour began on June 16, 1999 and was initially planned to end on December 15, 1999, but due to it being very commercially successful, the tour was extended from December 30, 1999 to March 5, 2000 in North America. Cyndi Lauper, Wild Orchid, Michael McDonald, Julio Iglesias Jr., Lou Bega and Belinda Carlisle were the opening acts at different times during the tour.

The August 28, 1999 performance at the MGM Grand Garden Arena was made into the Emmy Awards-nominated HBO television special Live in Concert, which aired the following day, and by year's end was released on VHS and DVD. As stated by Billboard, the HBO television special was the highest-rated original program in over 2 years.

== Costumes ==
Cher appeared in a variety of costumes during the performance. Her opening outfit, involving a stringed skirt, meshed top over a cross, and a huge red wig, was dubbed self-deprecatingly by her as the "Bozo the Clown-meets-Braveheart look" or the 'Super Groundforce Girl' referring to Charlie Dimmock from the popular-at-the-time Ground Force gardening show. All in all there were 7 to 9 different ensembles, with none lasting more than a handful of songs.

== Reception ==
Reviews of the show were often favorable, given Cher's return to popularity and over-the-top appeal. The New York Times said Cher had "a quintessential rock voice ... spectacularly styled with a rough and tumble vaudevillian edge." The Washington Post viewed it as "a dynamic, over-the-top extravaganza." The Dallas Morning News said "her concert was entertaining and gleefully glitzy."

The tour grossed $37.7 million from 57 shows in 1999, ranking sixth on Pollstar's list of the year's highest-grossing North American concert tours and second among women, behind Shania Twain. It concluded in 2000 after 121 shows.

== Set list ==
1. "I Still Haven't Found What I'm Looking For"
2. "All or Nothing"
3. "The Power"
4. "We All Sleep Alone"
5. "I Found Someone"
6. "The Way of Love"
7. "Half-Breed"
8. "Gypsys, Tramps & Thieves"
9. "Dark Lady"
10. "Take Me Home"
11. "After All"
12. "Walking in Memphis"
13. "Just Like Jesse James"
14. "Heart of Stone"
15. "The Shoop Shoop Song (It's in His Kiss)"
16. "Dov'è l'amore"
17. "Strong Enough"
18. "If I Could Turn Back Time"

Encore

19. "Believe"

Notes

- "Heart of Stone" was cut from the set list after the first three performances.
- "Just Like Jesse James" was not performed during the show in University Park.
- "Dark Lady" was not played in Paris.
- The introduction of the band and dancers were removed in some states such as Wantagh, New York, Moline, Illinois, and Columbus, Ohio.

== Tour dates ==
List of concerts, showing date, city, country, venue, opening act, tickets sold, number of available tickets and amount of gross revenue
| Date | City | Country | Venue | Opening act(s) | Tickets sold / available | Gross revenue |
|---|---|---|---|---|---|---|
North America
| June 16, 1999 | Phoenix | United States | America West Arena | Cyndi Lauper; Wild Orchid | 12,822 / 12,822 | $779,965 |
| June 18, 1999 | The Woodlands | United States | Cynthia Woods Mitchell Pavilion | Cyndi Lauper; Wild Orchid | 12,876 / 12,876 | $603,983 |
| June 19, 1999 | San Antonio | United States | Alamodome | Cyndi Lauper; Wild Orchid | 15,102 / 16,969 | $803,885 |
| June 20, 1999 | Dallas | United States | Coca-Cola Starplex Amphitheatre | Cyndi Lauper; Wild Orchid | 14,646 /15,532 | $654,750 |
| June 23, 1999 | New Orleans | United States | Louisiana Superdome | Cyndi Lauper; Wild Orchid | 12,754 / 16,000 | $712,529 |
| June 25, 1999 | Tampa | United States | Ice Palace | Cyndi Lauper; Wild Orchid | 15,515 / 15,515 | $1,019,950 |
| June 26, 1999 | Sunrise | United States | National Car Rental Center | Cyndi Lauper; Wild Orchid | 15,133 / 15,133 | $935,597 |
| June 29, 1999 | Nashville | United States | Nashville Arena | Cyndi Lauper; Wild Orchid | 11,047 / 13,271 | $486,906 |
| June 30, 1999 | Atlanta | United States | Coca-Cola Lakewood Amphitheatre | Cyndi Lauper; Wild Orchid | 14,495 / 15,051 | $672,010 |
| July 2, 1999 | Cleveland | United States | Gund Arena | Cyndi Lauper; Wild Orchid | 12,773 / 20,750 | $717,550 |
| July 3, 1999 | Burgettstown | United States | Coca-Cola Star Lake Amphitheater | Cyndi Lauper; Wild Orchid | 13,882 / 23,212 | $507,779 |
| July 5, 1999 | Wantagh | United States | Jones Beach Theater | Cyndi Lauper; Wild Orchid | 28,166 / 28,166 | $1,528,420 |
| July 6, 1999 | Wantagh | United States | Jones Beach Theater | Cyndi Lauper; Wild Orchid | 28,166 / 28,166 | $1,528,420 |
| July 8, 1999 | Wallingford | United States | Oakdale Theatre | Cyndi Lauper; Wild Orchid | 4,627 / 4,821 | $381,770 |
| July 10, 1999 | Philadelphia | United States | First Union Center | Cyndi Lauper; Wild Orchid | 14,136 / 14,136 | $909,564 |
| July 11, 1999 | Bristow | United States | Nissan Pavilion at Stone Ridge | Cyndi Lauper; Wild Orchid | 10,827 / 22,549 | $580,722 |
| July 13, 1999 | New York City | United States | Madison Square Garden | Cyndi Lauper; Wild Orchid | 15,439 / 15,439 | $1,070,828 |
| July 14, 1999 | Holmdel | United States | PNC Bank Arts Center | Cyndi Lauper; Wild Orchid | 16,955 / 17,076 | $872,117 |
| July 16, 1999 | Albany | United States | Pepsi Arena | Cyndi Lauper; Wild Orchid | 11,449 / 17,000 | $599,850 |
| July 17, 1999 | Mansfield | United States | Tweeter Center for the Performing Arts | Cyndi Lauper; Wild Orchid | 14,450 / 19,800 | $635,048 |
| July 19, 1999 | Toronto | Canada | Air Canada Centre | Cyndi Lauper; Wild Orchid | 13,867 / 13,867 | $644,169 |
| July 21, 1999 | Montreal | Canada | Molson Centre | Cyndi Lauper; Wild Orchid | 9,029 / 11,915 | $431,342 |
| August 2, 1999 | Milwaukee | United States | Bradley Center | Cyndi Lauper; Wild Orchid | 12,243 / 20,000 | $746,257 |
| August 4, 1999 | Minneapolis | United States | Target Center | Cyndi Lauper; Wild Orchid | 13,138 / 13,138 | $721,656 |
| August 5, 1999 | Bonner Springs | United States | Sandstone Amphitheater | Cyndi Lauper; Wild Orchid | 12,468 / 18,000 | $581,976 |
| August 7, 1999 | Denver | United States | McNichols Sports Arena | Cyndi Lauper; Wild Orchid | 11,568 / 11,568 | $678,757 |
| August 10, 1999 | Edmonton | Canada | Skyreach Centre | Cyndi Lauper; Wild Orchid | 10,416 / 10,416 | $550,513 |
| August 11, 1999 | Calgary | Canada | Canadian Airlines Saddledome | Cyndi Lauper; Wild Orchid | 12,422 / 12,422 | $639,749 |
| August 13, 1999 | Vancouver | Canada | General Motors Place | Cyndi Lauper; Wild Orchid | 12,950 / 12,950 | $656,209 |
| August 14, 1999 | Seattle | United States | KeyArena | Cyndi Lauper; Wild Orchid | 11,495 / 15,600 | $696,094 |
| August 17, 1999 | Mountain View | United States | Shoreline Amphitheatre | Cyndi Lauper; Wild Orchid | 15,022 / 22,000 | $699,665 |
| August 18, 1999 | Concord | United States | Concord Pavilion | Cyndi Lauper; Wild Orchid | 12,500 / 12,500 | $729,754 |
| August 20, 1999 | Anaheim | United States | Arrowhead Pond of Anaheim | Cyndi Lauper; Wild Orchid | 23,963 / 23,963 | $1,358,370 |
| August 21, 1999 | Anaheim | United States | Arrowhead Pond of Anaheim | Cyndi Lauper; Wild Orchid | 23,963 / 23,963 | $1,358,370 |
| August 24, 1999 | San Diego | United States | San Diego Sports Arena | Cyndi Lauper; Wild Orchid | 8,322 /9,363 | $561,593 |
| August 25, 1999 | Sacramento | United States | ARCO Arena | Cyndi Lauper; Wild Orchid | —N/a | —N/a |
| August 27, 1999 | Las Vegas | United States | MGM Grand Garden Arena | Cyndi Lauper; Wild Orchid | 24,462 / 24,462 | $1,954,438 |
| August 28, 1999 | Las Vegas | United States | MGM Grand Garden Arena | Cyndi Lauper; Wild Orchid | 24,462 / 24,462 | $1,954,438 |
| September 1, 1999 (Note: Originally set for July 30, 1999.) | Tinley Park | United States | New World Music Theatre | Julio Iglesias Jr. Michael McDonald | 13,387 / 15,000 | $672,209 |
| September 2, 1999 (Note: Originally set for July 31, 1999.) | St. Louis | United States | Kiel Center | Julio Iglesias Jr. Michael McDonald | 12,429 / 12,429 | $639,510 |
| September 4, 1999 (Note: Originally set for July 28, 1999.) | Cincinnati | United States | Firstar Center | Julio Iglesias Jr. Michael McDonald | 9,447 / 18,026 | $519,642 |
| September 5, 1999 | Buffalo | United States | Marine Midland Arena | Julio Iglesias Jr. Michael McDonald | 11,865 / 11,865 | $588,031 |
| September 7, 1999 | University Park | United States | Bryce Jordan Center | Cyndi Lauper; Julio Iglesias Jr. | 10,413 / 12,000 | $468,082 |
| September 8, 1999 | Virginia Beach | United States | GTE Virginia Beach Amphitheater | Cyndi Lauper; Julio Iglesias Jr. | 11,920 / 20,000 | $534,822 |
| September 10, 1999 (Note: Originally set for July 27, 1999.) | Noblesville | United States | Deer Creek Music Center | Cyndi Lauper; Julio Iglesias Jr. | 17,823 / 20,118 | $687,772 |
| September 11, 1999 (Note: Originally set for July 23, 1999.) | Auburn Hills | United States | The Palace of Auburn Hills | Cyndi Lauper; Julio Iglesias Jr. | 29,582 / 29,582 | $1,659,268 |
| September 12, 1999 | Auburn Hills | United States | The Palace of Auburn Hills | Cyndi Lauper; Julio Iglesias Jr. | 29,582 / 29,582 | $1,659,268 |
| September 14, 1999 | Madison | United States | Kohl Center | Cyndi Lauper; Julio Iglesias Jr. | 10,494 / 12,845 | $564,970 |
| September 15, 1999 | Grand Rapids | United States | Van Andel Arena | Cyndi Lauper; Julio Iglesias Jr. | 12,063 / 12,864 | $664,889 |
| September 17, 1999 | Columbus | United States | Polaris Amphitheater | Cyndi Lauper; Julio Iglesias Jr. | 15,391 / 19,900 | $641,632 |
| September 18, 1999 | Rosemont | United States | Rosemont Horizon | Cyndi Lauper; Julio Iglesias Jr. | 13,159 / 13,159 | $839,225 |
| September 20, 1999 (Note: Originally set for July 24, 1999.) | Moline | United States | The MARK of the Quad Cities | Cyndi Lauper; Julio Iglesias Jr. | 10,745 / 10,745 | $590,928 |
| September 23, 1999 | Sunrise | United States | National Car Rental Center | Cyndi Lauper; Julio Iglesias Jr. | 13,338 / 16,141 | $841,294 |
| September 25, 1999 | Orlando | United States | Orlando Arena | Cyndi Lauper; Julio Iglesias Jr. | 11,542 / 17,712 | $700,947 |
| September 26, 1999 | Atlanta | United States | Philips Arena | Cyndi Lauper; Julio Iglesias Jr. | 10,982 / 15,914 | $585,996 |
| September 28, 1999 | Charlotte | United States | Charlotte Coliseum | Cyndi Lauper; Julio Iglesias Jr. | 12,785 / 12,785 | $623,603 |
Europe
| October 15, 1999 | London | England | Wembley Arena | Belinda Carlisle | —N/a | —N/a |
| October 16, 1999 | London | England | Wembley Arena | Belinda Carlisle | —N/a | —N/a |
| October 18, 1999 | London | England | Wembley Arena | Belinda Carlisle | —N/a | —N/a |
| October 19, 1999 | Birmingham | England | NEC Arena | Belinda Carlisle | —N/a | —N/a |
| October 21, 1999 | Glasgow | Scotland | Scottish Exhibition and Conference Centre | Belinda Carlisle | —N/a | —N/a |
| October 23, 1999 | Manchester | England | Manchester Evening News Arena | Belinda Carlisle | —N/a | —N/a |
| October 24, 1999 | Manchester | England | Manchester Evening News Arena | Belinda Carlisle | —N/a | —N/a |
| October 26, 1999 | Hamburg | Germany | Alsterdorfer Sporthalle | Belinda Carlisle | —N/a | —N/a |
| October 27, 1999 | Rotterdam | Netherlands | Sportpaleis van Ahoy | Belinda Carlisle | —N/a | —N/a |
| October 29, 1999 | Cologne | Germany | Kölnarena | Belinda Carlisle | —N/a | —N/a |
| October 30, 1999 | Berlin | Germany | Velodrom | Belinda Carlisle | —N/a | —N/a |
| November 1, 1999 | Frankfurt | Germany | Festhalle Frankfurt | Belinda Carlisle | —N/a | —N/a |
| November 3, 1999 | Zürich | Switzerland | Hallenstadion | Belinda Carlisle | —N/a | —N/a |
| November 4, 1999 | Milan | Italy | Fila Forum | Belinda Carlisle | —N/a | —N/a |
| November 6, 1999 | Stuttgart | Germany | Hanns-Martin-Schleyer-Halle | Belinda Carlisle | —N/a | —N/a |
| November 7, 1999 | Innsbruck | Austria | Olympiahalle Innsbruck | Belinda Carlisle | —N/a | —N/a |
| November 9, 1999 | Paris | France | Palais Omnisports de Paris-Bercy | Belinda Carlisle | —N/a | —N/a |
| November 10, 1999 | Dortmund | Germany | Westfalenhallen | Belinda Carlisle | —N/a | —N/a |
| November 12, 1999 | Munich | Germany | Olympiahalle | Belinda Carlisle | —N/a | —N/a |
| November 13, 1999 | Munich | Germany | Olympiahalle | Belinda Carlisle | —N/a | —N/a |
| November 14, 1999 | Kiel | Germany | Ostseehalle | Belinda Carlisle | —N/a | —N/a |
| November 16, 1999 | Oslo | Norway | Oslo Spektrum | Belinda Carlisle | —N/a | —N/a |
| November 17, 1999 | Stockholm | Sweden | Stockholm Globe Arena | Belinda Carlisle | —N/a | —N/a |
| November 19, 1999 | Gothenburg | Sweden | Scandinavium | Belinda Carlisle | —N/a | —N/a |
| November 21, 1999 | Helsinki | Finland | Hartwall Arena | Belinda Carlisle | —N/a | —N/a |
| November 24, 1999 | Copenhagen | Denmark | Forum Copenhagen | Belinda Carlisle | —N/a | —N/a |
| November 25, 1999 | Copenhagen | Denmark | Forum Copenhagen | Belinda Carlisle | —N/a | —N/a |
| November 27, 1999 | Hanover | Germany | AWD Hall | Belinda Carlisle | —N/a | —N/a |
| November 28, 1999 | Frankfurt | Germany | Festhalle Frankfurt | Belinda Carlisle | —N/a | —N/a |
| November 30, 1999 | Vienna | Austria | Wiener Stadthalle | Belinda Carlisle | —N/a | —N/a |
| December 1, 1999 | Prague | Czech Republic | Paegas Arena | Belinda Carlisle | —N/a | —N/a |
| December 2, 1999 | Leipzig | Germany | Messehalle 1 | Belinda Carlisle | —N/a | —N/a |
| December 5, 1999 | Dublin | Ireland | Point Theatre | Belinda Carlisle | —N/a | —N/a |
| December 6, 1999 | Dublin | Ireland | Point Theatre | Belinda Carlisle | —N/a | —N/a |
| December 8, 1999 | Birmingham | England | NEC Arena | Belinda Carlisle | —N/a | —N/a |
| December 9, 1999 | Newcastle | England | Telewest Arena | Belinda Carlisle | —N/a | —N/a |
| December 11, 1999 | Sheffield | England | Sheffield Arena | Belinda Carlisle | —N/a | —N/a |
| December 12, 1999 | Ghent | Belgium | Flanders Expo | Belinda Carlisle | —N/a | —N/a |
| December 13, 1999 | Lisbon | Portugal | Estádio da Tapadinha | Belinda Carlisle | —N/a | —N/a |
| December 14, 1999 | Madrid | Spain | Raimundo Saporta Pavilion | Belinda Carlisle | —N/a | —N/a |
| December 15, 1999 | Barcelona | Spain | Palau Sant Jordi | Belinda Carlisle | —N/a | —N/a |
North America
| December 30, 1999 | Atlantic City | United States | Boardwalk Hall | Lou Bega; CNOTE | —N/a | —N/a |
| December 31, 1999 | Atlantic City | United States | Boardwalk Hall | Lou Bega; CNOTE | —N/a | —N/a |
| January 28, 2000 | Salt Lake City | United States | Delta Center | Lou Bega; CNOTE | 12,363 / 15,000 | $518,346 |
| January 29, 2000 | Las Vegas | United States | MGM Grand Garden Arena | Lou Bega; CNOTE | 13,572 / 13,572 | $1,108,652 |
| February 1, 2000 | Phoenix | United States | America West Arena | Lou Bega; CNOTE | 12,168 / 13,113 | $774,100 |
| February 2, 2000 | Los Angeles | United States | Staples Center | Lou Bega; CNOTE | 12,410 / 14,738 | $745,385 |
| February 3, 2000 | Los Angeles | United States | Staples Center | Lou Bega; CNOTE | —N/a | —N/a |
| February 5, 2000 | San Jose | United States | San Jose Arena | Lou Bega; CNOTE | 14,068 / 20,000 | $768,830 |
| February 8, 2000 | Columbus | United States | Schottenstein Center | Lou Bega; CNOTE | 7,876 / 15,000 | $503,059 |
| February 9, 2000 | Louisville | United States | Freedom Hall | Lou Bega; CNOTE | 12,561 / 15,510 | $754,640 |
| February 11, 2000 | Rosemont | United States | Allstate Arena | Lou Bega; CNOTE | 13,995 / 13,995 | $852,265 |
| February 12, 2000 | East Lansing | United States | Breslin Student Events Center | Lou Bega; CNOTE | 10,148 / 10,148 | $587,987 |
| February 14, 2000 | Fairborn | United States | Nutter Center | Lou Bega; CNOTE | 10,340 / 12,044 | $586,221 |
| February 15, 2000 | Champaign | United States | Assembly Hall | Lou Bega; CNOTE | 7,982 / 8,800 | $435,456 |
| February 17, 2000 | Toronto | Canada | Air Canada Centre | Lou Bega; CNOTE | 14,127 / 14,127 | $678,661 |
| February 18, 2000 | Ottawa | Canada | Corel Centre | Lou Bega; CNOTE | 12,926 / 12,926 | $620,507 |
| February 21, 2000 | Miami | United States | American Airlines Arena | Lou Bega; CNOTE | 12,036 / 12,773 | $592,133 |
| February 24, 2000 | East Rutherford | United States | Continental Airlines Arena | Lou Bega; CNOTE | 17,199 / 17,199 | $983,424 |
| February 26, 2000 | Raleigh | United States | Raleigh Entertainment and Sports Arena | Lou Bega; CNOTE | 11,086 / 11,086 | $654,915 |
| February 27, 2000 | Washington, D.C. | United States | MCI Center | Lou Bega; CNOTE | 12,207 / 14,385 | $648,067 |
| February 29, 2000 | Greenville | United States | BI-LO Center | Lou Bega; CNOTE | 11,782 / 11,782 | $662,795 |
| March 1, 2000 | Roanoke | United States | Roanoke Civic Center | Lou Bega; CNOTE | 8,089 / 8,089 | $489,987 |
| March 2, 2000 | Roanoke | United States | Roanoke Civic Center | Lou Bega; CNOTE | —N/a | —N/a |
| March 3, 2000 | Boston | United States | FleetCenter | Lou Bega; CNOTE | 14,589 / 14,589 | $908,183 |
| Total | | | | | 939,848 / 1,088,243 (86%) | $80,000,000 |

== Cancelled shows ==
List of cancelled concerts, showing date, city, country, venue, and reason for cancellation
| Date | City | Country | Venue | Reason |
|---|---|---|---|---|
| March 5, 2000 | Philadelphia | United States | First Union Center | Unknown |

== Personnel ==
- Lead Vocals: Cher
- Tour Director: Doriana Sanchez
- Musical Director: Paul Mirkovich
- Costume Design: Bob Mackie

=== Band ===
- Keyboards: Paul Mirkovich
- Guitars: David Barry
- Guitars: Russell Powell
- Keyboards: Darrel Smith
- Bass: Don Boyette
- Drums: Mark Schulman
- Background vocals: Stacy Campbell
- Background vocals: Patty Darcy Jones

=== Dancers ===
- Dancer: Bubba Carr
- Dancer: Aaron James Cash
- Dancer: Suzanne Easter
- Dancer: Kristin Richardson (née Willits)
- Dancer: Tovaris Wilson
- Dancer: Addie Yungmee
