= Heart of Stone Tour =

1989–90 concert tour by Cher

- Tour by Cher
- Poster to the concert in Philadelphia, USA
- Associated album: Heart of Stone
- Start date: August 16, 1989
- End date: December 4, 1990
- Legs: 4
- No. of shows: 78 in North America; 6 in Europe; 11 in Oceania; 95 in total

Cher concert chronology
- Take Me Home Tour (1979–82); Heart of Stone Tour (1989–90); Love Hurts Tour (1991–92)

The Heart of Stone Tour was the second solo concert tour by American singer-actress Cher. The tour supported her nineteenth studio album, Heart of Stone. A mini tour was set up in the summer 1989, and a second leg started in 1990. The tour reached North America, Australia and Europe.

== Background ==
The Heart of Stone Tour was Cher's most ambitious solo tour, after an 8-year absence, and spanned eight months, three continents plus two casinos, the Sands Hotel in Atlantic City and The Mirage in Las Vegas. It was, in Cher's own words, "a cross between Phantom of the Opera and Metallica". Her then-manager Bill Sammeth first set up a mini August tour in 1989, including stops in Detroit, Philadelphia, Chicago, Long Island, Providence, and Atlantic City. In eight shows, grosses of $200,000-plus per night were made before audiences of 8,000–11,500. After the filming of Mermaids, Cher resumed a bigger leg. The tour had been scheduled to open March 18 in Tucson, but the date was changed when the influenza threw Cher off her rehearsal schedule. Cher finally kicked off the North American leg of the tour in Dallas on March 31, 1990. The tour ran through to August 1990, and then proceeded to Europe and Australia in October and November.

Cher sang in eight shows, during a six-night engagement, at the 1,500-seat theatre of The Mirage.

== Reception ==
The New York Times wrote of Heart of Stone Tour, "Her show is a kind of Las Vegas mystery play with a message: Trust yourself, don't give up on life or love, and eternal celebrity can be yours."

== Set list ==
1. "I'm No Angel"
2. "Hold On"
3. "We All Sleep Alone"
4. "Bang-Bang"
5. "I Found Someone"
6. "Perfection"
7. "Tougher Than the Rest"
8. "After All"
9. "If I Could Turn Back Time"

Encore

10. "Many Rivers to Cross"
11. "Heart of Stone"
12. "Takin' It to the Streets"
Notes
- "Heart of Stone" was performed on selected dates.
- During the Mirage Concert, "The Fire Down Below" and "Take It to the Limit" were performed.
- "I'll Be There for You" was performed on selected dates in North America.
- "Love Hurts" and "Desperado" were performed in Australian concerts.
- "Just Like Jesse James" was performed during rehearsals, but didn't make it on the official setlist.

== Tour dates ==
Date	City	Country	Venue	Tickets sold / available	Revenue
North America
August 16, 1989	Atlantic City	United States	Sands Hotel	—N/a	—N/a
August 17, 1989	Atlantic City	United States	Sands Hotel	—N/a	—N/a
August 18, 1989	Atlantic City	United States	Sands Hotel	—N/a	—N/a
August 19, 1989	Atlantic City	United States	Sands Hotel	—N/a	—N/a
August 20, 1989	Atlantic City	United States	Sands Hotel	—N/a	—N/a
August 23, 1989	Holmdel Township	United States	Garden State Arts Center	—N/a	—N/a
August 25, 1989	Detroit	United States	Fox Theatre	9,376 / 9,376	$317,368
August 26, 1989	Detroit	United States	Fox Theatre	9,376 / 9,376	$317,368
August 27, 1989	Cuyahoga Falls	United States	Blossom Music Center	—N/a	—N/a
August 29, 1989	Philadelphia	United States	Mann Music Center	8,372 / 13,243	$205,789
August 30, 1989	Hartford	United States	Hartford Civic Center	11,577 / 11,577	$262,002
August 31, 1989	Wantagh	United States	Jones Beach Theater	10,000 / 10,000	$254,625
September 2, 1989	Saratoga Springs	United States	Saratoga Performing Arts Center	—N/a	—N/a
September 4, 1989	Bristol	United States	Lake Compounce	—N/a	—N/a
March 31, 1990	Dallas	United States	Coca-Cola Starplex Amphitheatre	11,511 / 20,000	$252,778
April 1, 1990	Houston	United States	The Summit	—N/a	—N/a
April 2, 1990	Austin	United States	Frank Erwin Center	—N/a	—N/a
April 4, 1990	Pensacola	United States	Pensacola Civic Center	—N/a	—N/a
April 6, 1990	Atlanta	United States	Omni Coliseum	—N/a	—N/a
April 7, 1990	Orlando	United States	Orlando Arena	—N/a	—N/a
April 8, 1990	Tampa	United States	USF Sun Dome	—N/a	—N/a
April 11, 1990	Miami	United States	James L. Knight Center	10,024 / 10,024	$352,838
April 12, 1990	Miami	United States	James L. Knight Center	10,024 / 10,024	$352,838
April 27, 1990	Atlantic City	United States	Copa Room	2,550 / 2,550	—N/a
April 28, 1990	Atlantic City	United States	Copa Room	2,550 / 2,550	—N/a
April 29, 1990	Atlantic City	United States	Copa Room	2,550 / 2,550	—N/a
May 1, 1990	Providence	United States	Providence Civic Center	9,642 / 12,100	$221,776
May 2, 1990	Landover	United States	Capital Centre	9,728 / 18,000	$243,200
May 4, 1990	Atlantic City	United States	Copa Room	1,700 / 1,700	—N/a
May 5, 1990	Atlantic City	United States	Copa Room	1,700 / 1,700	—N/a
May 7, 1990	Rochester	United States	Rochester Community War Memorial	8,884 / 8,884	$213,150
May 9, 1990	Albany	United States	Knickerbocker Arena	12,998 / 12,998	$280,637
May 10, 1990	Uniondale	United States	Nassau Veterans Memorial Coliseum	13,250 / 17,000	$348,560
May 12, 1990	East Rutherford	United States	Brendan Byrne Arena	16,987 / 16,987	$408,267
May 13, 1990	Worcester	United States	Centrum in Worcester	12,000 / 12,000	$294,212
May 15, 1990	Niagara Falls	United States	Niagara Falls Convention and Civic Center	7,960 / 7,960	$197,250
May 16, 1990	Pittsburgh	United States	Civic Arena	12,880 / 16,000	—N/a
May 19, 1990	Auburn Hills	United States	The Palace of Auburn Hills	16,739 / 16,739	$380,778
May 20, 1990	Cincinnati	United States	Riverfront Coliseum	9,638 / 17,000	$212,036
June 1, 1990	St. Louis	United States	St. Louis Arena	11,258 / 13,072	$255,816
June 2, 1990	Tinley Park	United States	World Music Theatre	16,870 / 28,000	$374,750
June 4, 1990	Bloomington	United States	Met Center	9,810 / 17,000	$224,472
June 5, 1990	Ames	United States	Hilton Coliseum	9,368 / 10,300	$210,780
June 9, 1990	Greenwood Village	United States	Fiddler's Green Amphitheatre	—N/a	—N/a
June 14, 1990	Las Vegas	United States	Siegfried & Roy Theatre	—N/a	—N/a
June 15, 1990	Las Vegas	United States	Siegfried & Roy Theatre	—N/a	—N/a
June 16, 1990	Las Vegas	United States	Siegfried & Roy Theatre	—N/a	—N/a
June 17, 1990	Las Vegas	United States	Siegfried & Roy Theatre	—N/a	—N/a
June 18, 1990	Las Vegas	United States	Siegfried & Roy Theatre	—N/a	—N/a
June 19, 1990	Las Vegas	United States	Siegfried & Roy Theatre	—N/a	—N/a
June 21, 1990	San Diego	United States	San Diego Sports Arena	—N/a	—N/a
June 29, 1990	Tempe	United States	ASU Activity Center	—N/a	—N/a
July 6, 1990	Milwaukee	United States	Marcus Amphitheater	—N/a	—N/a
July 7, 1990	Toledo	United States	Savage Hall	—N/a	—N/a
July 9, 1990	Richfield Township	United States	Coliseum at Richfield	—N/a	—N/a
July 11, 1990	Indianapolis	United States	Market Square Arena	—N/a	—N/a
July 12, 1990	Lexington	United States	Rupp Arena	—N/a	—N/a
July 16, 1990	Wantagh	United States	Jones Beach Theater	—N/a	—N/a
July 17, 1990	Philadelphia	United States	The Spectrum	—N/a	—N/a
July 20, 1990	Bristol	United States	Lake Compounce	—N/a	—N/a
July 22, 1990	Erie	United States	Erie Civic Center	—N/a	—N/a
July 26, 1990	Moncton	Canada	Moncton Coliseum	—N/a	—N/a
July 27, 1990	Halifax	Canada	Halifax Metro Centre	—N/a	—N/a
July 29, 1990	Old Orchard Beach	United States	Seashore Performing Arts Center	—N/a	—N/a
August 11, 1990	Sacramento	United States	ARCO Arena	—N/a	—N/a
August 12, 1990	Oakland	United States	Oakland–Alameda County Coliseum Arena	9,040 / 13,453	$238,900
August 14, 1990	Spokane	United States	Spokane Coliseum	—N/a	—N/a
August 15, 1990	Tacoma	United States	Tacoma Dome	—N/a	—N/a
August 17, 1990	Salem	United States	L. B. Day Amphitheatre	—N/a	—N/a
August 18, 1990	Vancouver	Canada	Pacific Coliseum	—N/a	—N/a
August 20, 1990	Calgary	Canada	Olympic Saddledome	13,218 / 17,000	$304,416
August 21, 1990	Edmonton	Canada	Northlands Coliseum	—N/a	—N/a
August 25, 1990	Ottawa	Canada	Lansdowne Park	11,382 / 12,000	$298,461
August 28, 1990	Montreal	Canada	Montreal Forum	8,086 / 10,233	$230,447
August 29, 1990	Toronto	Canada	CNE Grandstand	—N/a	—N/a
Europe
October 14, 1990	Dublin	Ireland	Point Theatre	—N/a	—N/a
October 16, 1990	London	England	Wembley Arena	—N/a	—N/a
October 17, 1990	London	England	Wembley Arena	—N/a	—N/a
October 19, 1990	London	England	Wembley Arena	—N/a	—N/a
October 21, 1990	Birmingham	England	NEC Arena	—N/a	—N/a
October 23, 1990	Birmingham	England	NEC Arena	—N/a	—N/a
Australia
November 14, 1990	Adelaide	Australia	Memorial Drive Park	—N/a	—N/a
November 16, 1990	Sydney	Australia	Sydney Entertainment Centre	—N/a	—N/a
November 17, 1990	Sydney	Australia	Sydney Entertainment Centre	—N/a	—N/a
November 19, 1990	Sydney	Australia	Sydney Entertainment Centre	—N/a	—N/a
November 20, 1990	Sydney	Australia	Sydney Entertainment Centre	—N/a	—N/a
November 21, 1990	Sydney	Australia	Sydney Entertainment Centre	—N/a	—N/a
November 23, 1990	Melbourne	Australia	National Tennis Centre	—N/a	—N/a
November 24, 1990	Melbourne	Australia	National Tennis Centre	—N/a	—N/a
November 26, 1990	Melbourne	Australia	National Tennis Centre	—N/a	—N/a
November 27, 1990	Melbourne	Australia	National Tennis Centre	—N/a	—N/a
November 28, 1990	Melbourne	Australia	National Tennis Centre	—N/a	—N/a
North America
December 2, 1990	Las Vegas	United States	Siegfried & Roy Theatre	—N/a	—N/a
December 3, 1990	Las Vegas	United States	Siegfried & Roy Theatre	—N/a	—N/a
December 4, 1990	Las Vegas	United States	Siegfried & Roy Theatre	—N/a	—N/a

=== Additional notes ===
Prior to the opening concert of the Australian leg of her concert in Adelaide on November 14, Cher also performed the after race concert at the conclusion of the 1990 Australian Formula One Grand Prix on November 4. The concert was held on the Christian Brothers College Oval in the middle of the Adelaide Street Circuit and a ticket to the race granted free entry to the show.

Cancellations: Cher had to cancel her tour in Russia, two days after the tickets were sold. She was rumored to cancel dates in Brazil and Argentina as well.

== Personnel ==
- Show Directed by Kenny Ortega
- Artistic Director: Marty Callner
- Musical Director: Gary Scott
- Set Designer: Kenny Ortega
- Costume Design: Bob Mackie
- Additional Costumes: Ret Turner
- Additional Costumes: Mike Schmidt
- Make-up: Leonard Engelman
- Hair: Renate Leuschner
- Keyboards: Paul Mirkovich
- Guitar: Elijah Blue Allman
- Guitar: Dave Amato
- Guitar: David Shelley
- Bass: Hugh McDonald
- Bass: Donnie Nossov
- Drums: Ron Wikso
- Lead Vocals: Cher
- Backing Vocalist: Darlene Love
- Backing Vocalist: Pattie Darcy Jones
- Backing Vocalist: Edna Wright
- Dancers: Bubba Carr
- Dancers: Aaron Cash
- Dancers: Bill Holden Jr.
- Dancers: Trish Ramish
- Dancers: Michelle Rudy
- Dancers: Peter Tramm
- Dancers: Eyan Williams
- Dancers: Troy Burgess

== Broadcasts and recordings ==
Only a few dates during this tour were recorded and kept. The shows that we know were definitely recorded are:

Pensacola Civic Center, Pensacola, Florida, USA
Cher's 1990 Pensacola, Florida date was one of the concerts recorded as told by Cher herself on the 2005 release of the Mirage Special. During this concert, Cher's microphone does not work during the opening. There is no known copy of this concert in circulation and the only footage available is on the Mirage concert DVD. It is under the title of blooper in the bonus features and features only the concert intro and snippet of 'I'm No Angel'.

In 2020, TimeLife released “The Best Of Cher” on DVD. A bonus feature included “Baby Hold On” and “Tougher Than The Rest” as recorded in Pensacola.

Mirage Hotel & Casino, Las Vegas, Nevada, USA
Cher's two concerts at the Mirage Hotel & Casino in Las Vegas, Nevada were filmed as part of Cher's CBS special to be shown on television. These shows saw some of Cher's more conservative alternatives to her mainstream tour outfits, somewhat more suitable for a TV audience. Cher's outfit for 'If I Could Turn Back Time' is notably different as is Cher's opening outfit which seems more formal interpretation of the original. The stage shape was also altered for these shows, with runways forming two audience pits which joined at the centre. The TV Special was aired February 4, 1991."

Jones Beach Amphitheater, Wantagh, New York, USA
This concert was filmed to be used in part with the 'Prime Time Live' Cher Tour special. The show featured interviews with Cher and backstage rehearsal footage. The program then cut live to the concert where 'If I Could Turn Back Time' was performed. There are copies in circulation of this uncut concert but nothing commercial. It is reasonably difficult to obtain a copy other than from fan trades etc. The show features fewer songs than Cher's Mirage Special, but does include the original tour outfits.

Melbourne Tennis Center, Melbourne, Australia
This concert was broadcast live via satellite to Australia's Sky Channel members. The concert was shown in its entirety and uncut form, only once on television. Little is known about this show other than it features extra performances of Desperado and Love Hurts.

Dallas, Texas, USA
Footage from this concert was shown during the April 3, 1990 episode of Entertainment Tonight. They labelled the tour as "Cher Tour 1990" and the Dallas show as opening night. The show also showed backstage rehearsals the night before the opening.

Other Recordings
Other shows that haven't been identified were recorded on the tour which were used primarily for promotional use on programs such as Entertainment Tonight and Prime Time Live. The same footage shown on Prime Time Live has also been included as bonus features for some of the songs on the Mirage DVD release. The tour footage of the bonus songs on the Mirage DVD shows a different backing singer to any other footage.

== Rehearsal footage ==
During the promotion of the tour, many television programs such as Entertainment Tonight went backstage showing the construction and rehearsal of the set. There is a fair amount of rehearsal footage considering the little amount of the tour that was filmed.Rehearsal footage is available as a second angle option in the 2005 release of her Mirage concert. The show was filmed on Cher's personal video camera in front of a small non-paying audience. The show at this stage is only in its development stages and the footage is used by Cher as a "work tape" for her to see where she can improve. During certain songs such as "I Found Someone" and "Takin' It to the Streets" in the original VHS and DVD releases, shots of Cher rehearsing for her Mirage shows were shown in black and white. Due to the fact the shots were shown over the concert, the original audio is not available although it does show Cher rehearsing her dance moves for the end track.In 1990 Prime Time Live did a special about Cher's upcoming tour. As well as showing clips from the tour and a satellite performance from the concert that night, footage of Cher rehearsing was also shown. It's not clear which show she was actually in sound check for, but during the rehearsal she requested the overall level of the band to be reduced.Footage from the Dallas, Texas rehearsals was shown with an Entertainment Tonight report on Cher's tour. It showed Cher practising her dance steps for her closing number and also miscues during the runthrough. The US TV show After Hours also showed rehearsal footage of songs such as "After All", "Hold On" and "I'll Be There For You" during an interview promoting the tour. The shots were possibly taken for her Atlantic City show as Cher mentions that that is where she is when being interview although this is not certain.
