= Living Proof: The Farewell Tour =

2002–05 concert tour by Cher

- World tour by Cher
- Promotional poster for the San Diego date.
- Location: North America; Europe; Oceania
- Associated album: Living Proof; The Very Best of Cher
- Start date: June 14, 2002
- End date: April 30, 2005
- Legs: 5
- No. of shows: 283 in North America; 28 in Europe; 14 in Oceania; 325 Total
- Attendance: 2,972,817
- Box office: US$250 million

Cher concert chronology
- Do You Believe? Tour (1999–2000); Living Proof: The Farewell Tour (2002–05); Cher (2008–11)

Living Proof: The Farewell Tour (also referred to as simply The Farewell Tour and later as The Never Can Say Goodbye Tour) was the fifth concert tour by American singer and actress Cher to promote her 24th studio album, Living Proof (2001), and her eighth official compilation album, The Very Best of Cher (2003). The tour officially began on June 14, 2002, in Toronto, Ontario, Canada, initially planned as a 59-date tour across North America.

Due to the popularity of the show, Cher decided to extend the tour by adding 100 new shows to North America, while also announcing plans for 2004 of playing in Asia, Europe, and Oceania, mainly in territories she either had never been to or had not visited for many years. The final show of the tour took place at the Hollywood Bowl, in Los Angeles, after a record-breaking 325 dates, grossing well over $200 million and earning Cher the Guinness World Record for the Highest Grossing Tour by a Female Artist, at the time.

The tour was planned similarly to her previous 1999–2000 Do You Believe? Tour; the setlist consisted of 21 songs (some changes were made to the set list during the European and Australasian legs), with four video montages and backing dancers and aerialists. Notable also were Cher's dozen costume-changes, designed by Cher's longtime collaborator and friend Bob Mackie.

The Farewell Tour generated positive reviews from critics. The concert was broadcast on NBC from American Airlines Arena, in Miami, over the Thanksgiving weekend in 2002. The concert special attracted nearly 17 million viewers and won three Primetime Emmy Awards. A DVD titled The Farewell Tour was released in summer 2003.

Although Cher stated that this would be her "final" tour, she returned to the road again in 2014 with her Dressed to Kill Tour, which visited 49 cities in North America. However, The Farewell Tour would be her last global tour until she embarked on the Here We Go Again Tour (2018–20).

== Background ==
The Farewell Tour logo

In January 2002, Cher said to Billboard magazine that she was contemplating a concert tour, but not for more than a year. "It honestly depends on whether or not I decide to do a couple of movies that I'm considering. It would be fun to do these new songs live, so we'll see what develops", she said. In May of the same year, she announced she would embark on a three-month tour that would be her last. She commented, "It's an artist's dream to have a career where you're continually drawing new people in, while hopefully keeping your longtime fans happy. But I'm certainly aware of the fact that it's a rare occurrence. I don't take for granted the fact that people still care about what I do on any level." She would later sarcastically remark, "I'm approaching 80 and if I did that thing everyone does, come back in five years, I'd be driving around in one of those carts you know, the ones with the joysticks you see in Costco. There are two reasons people come back. Because, like the Stones, they're broke. Again. Or they're old divas who can't wait to be out among their adoring fans. But this, this truly is it."

The tour kicked off in Toronto in June 2002 and would continue onward for a record-breaking 326 shows, ending in Los Angeles in April 2005. The final show was performed at the Hollywood Bowl, incidentally where Cher made her first concert appearance with former husband, Sonny Bono. Cher explains the longevity of the tour was based on asking her manager to continue to add dates because of the audience reaction. The tour was originally slated to end with the Australasian leg in the Fall of 2004, however, an additional North American leg was added in January 2005. She concluded, "I really don't want to stop. They're making me stop! I told the tour managers, 'But I haven't done Vermont or Delaware', and they said, 'There are no venues big enough, dear'. And then I said, 'So go out and build some! After that, physical restraint was mentioned.' But seriously, I figured if I didn't stop, I was going to go into permanent Marlene Dietrich mode. [...] And these are the song I sang for audiences in Alaska, Ohio, Connecticut... and then I'd keep falling off my elephant and eventually become a recluse." After the tour, Cher had hopes of recording a Christmas album and a country duet album. Additionally, she wanted to continue filming movies, return to doing TV specials and appearing on Broadway.

The tour also gave Cher the opportunity to perform in new territories in Europe and North America, including her first tour to reach New Zealand. According to the Dakota Student, the performance at the Alerus Center in Grand Forks, North Dakota was the largest [single night] audience the artist has performed for during her solo career. Although the article states over 20,000 were in attendance, Billboard later reported an audience of 19,531 spectators. This record was beat when she performed in Stockholm, Sweden at The Friends Arena though when she played to over 27,000 fans.

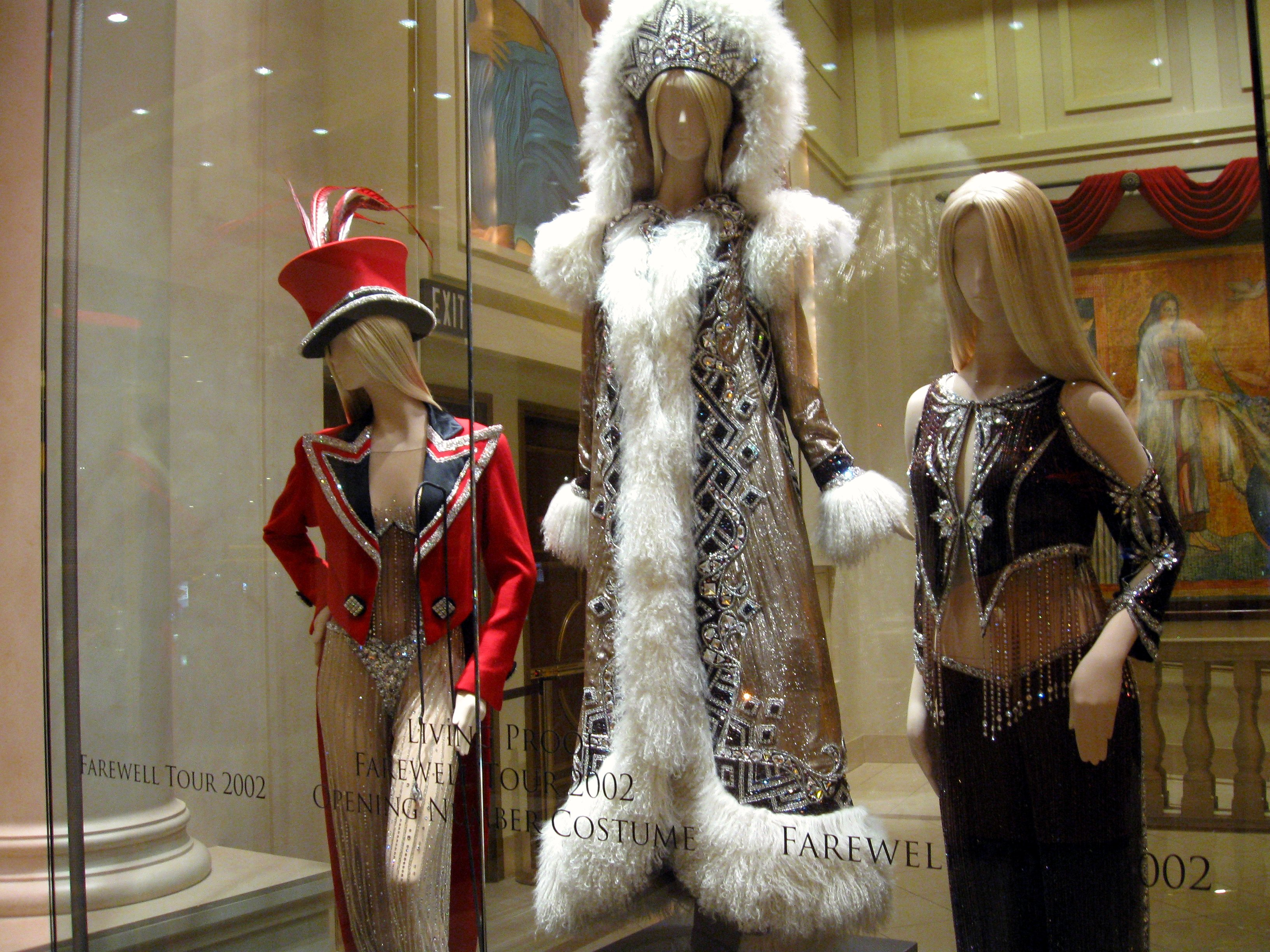
Three costumes worn by Cher during the Farewell Tour, on display at Caesars Palace

== Concert synopsis ==
“Ladies and gentlemen, and flamboyant gentlemen. Boys and girls and children of all ages. Welcome to the Cher-est show on earth. And this is the official beginning to the Cher show. And all I have to say is, ‘follow this, you bitches”.

The show begins with a video displaying a young Cher leaving her home. The video instantly progresses to an adult Cher walking into a blue room. The video continues to show Cher throughout the years in numerous music videos and live performances, including a few from The Sonny & Cher Comedy Hour, The Cher Show and Cher... Special. It then shows the singer during a photo shoot wearing many of her well-known costumes from the 70's and 80's. The video concludes showing the cover art of all of the singer's albums and singles. The final image shows Cher on a metallic purple background surround by butterflies as she descends on stage via chandelier performing U2's "I Still Haven't Found What I'm Looking For". "Song for the Lonely" continues the set before the singer pauses to acknowledge the audience explaining why it is her final tour. She exits the stage as her dancers perform a routine to "Gayatri Mantra", a well-known Hindu mantra. As the routine ends, Cher appears on a papier-mâché elephant performing "All or Nothing". The show continues with an aerial dance interlude and a performance of "I Found Someone".

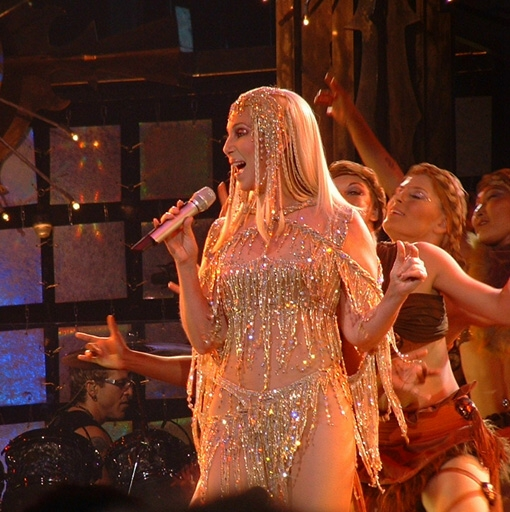
Cher performing during the Farewell Tour in France in 2004

After an extended guitar solo, Cher appears on the second tier of the stage in a tribal garment for a new rendition of "Bang Bang (My Baby Shot Me Down)". The next segment of the show begins with clips of Cher and ex-husband Sonny Bono performing three of their popular songs "The Beat Goes On", "Baby Don't Go", and "I Got You Babe". When the video ends, Cher appears on stage performing "All I Really Want to Do", which she explains was her first hit record. The segment continues with a medley of her solo singles "Half-Breed", "Gypsies, Tramps and Thieves" and "Dark Lady". The show progresses with a video montage of Cher's sitcom, "The Cher Show". Next, her dancers appear in leisure suit mimicking choreography displayed in Saturday Night Fever. Cher then emerges performing "Take Me Home". The video during the dance routine was from the disco section from the Cher... Special, aired in 1978 featuring Dolly Parton. Several elements of the show feature moments from this Special including the opening film, which features Dolly Parton and Cher singing the 'Heaven and Hell medley'. The song ends with another dance routine before Cher rejoins to perform "The Way of Love". The segment ends with a video of Cher perform scenes from West Side Story, originally shown in 1978 for "Cher... Special". This leads into another video showing clips from the singer's theatrical films including, Silkwood, Moonstruck and Mermaids. The video ends and Cher appears onstage to perform "After All". The show continues with "Just Like Jesse James", "Heart of Stone" and "The Shoop Shoop Song (It's in His Kiss)".

After Cher exits the stage, a video is played displaying various interviews of the singer from the 70s to 00s. The clips are interloped with outtakes of her recent music video for the song "Alive Again". The music video for "Strong Enough" is shown for the first verse before Cher appears onstage to conclude the song. This final segment concludes with a performance of "If I Could Turn Back Time". The show continues with an encore segment as Cher returns to the stage to perform "Believe".

== Critical reception ==
James Sullivan (San Francisco Chronicle) remarked how Cher is still viable amongst her younger peers stating, "The Britney effect of the latter look was unmistakable. Cher is well aware that her chameleonic glitz set the stage for the current era of stadium-size razzle-dazzle. She's comfortable enough to see such imitation as flattery, not theft."

Jim Farber (New York Daily News) felt the singer's numerous costumes changes and video interludes were a huge distraction from the overall show. In his article he writes, "During the course of Cher's hour-and-45-minute performances, she has been dressing as a bespangled circus ringleader, an iron-haired hippie chick, an S&M tart and what looks like Conan the Barbarian's favorite concubine. At one point, she even models that barely there black getup she wore in the 13-year-old hit video for "If I Could Turn Back Time." Which means she may be the only 56-year-old in history to appear in public in a thong. Oh, yes ... the show also features music."

Jon Pareles (The New York Times) praised her show at the Madison Square Garden remarking, "Once more, Cher triumphed over restraint, aging and gravity, standing proudly alongside her younger selves in the video clips. In her finale, Believe, she appeared in a long silvery dress while her dancers wore futuristic space suits. The song's verses used an electronic filter on Cher's vocal, turning her into cyber-Cher, a hit machine immune to sagging flesh. The song promises life after love; Cher, no doubt, will continue a celebrity life after soaking up her touring audiences' love one last time."

== Broadcasts and recordings ==
In 2002, the concerts at the American Airlines Arena, in Miami were filmed for an upcoming television special to be aired during Thanksgiving weekend. The concert special appeared on NBC and attracted near 17 million viewers. This concert special was later released on DVD and CD formats. The concert footage would achieve further acclaim earning three Primetime Emmy Awards for Outstanding Variety, Music or Comedy Series, Outstanding Costumes for a Variety or Music Program and Technical Direction, Camerawork, Video for a Miniseries, Movie or a Special. A DVD was released in the summer of 2003 and has sold over 400,000 copies. The DVD contains bonus footage including a behind–the–scenes documentary, a montage of Cher's costumes, a meet and greet with the team, extra monologues and the full performance of West Side Story from 1978. Additionally, it features rehearsal footage of "Save Up All Your Tears", "We All Sleep Alone" and "A Different Kind of Love Song".

== Set list ==
1. "I Still Haven't Found What I'm Looking For"
2. "Song for the Lonely"
3. "A Different Kind of Love Song"
4. "Gayatri Mantra"
5. "All or Nothing"
6. "We All Sleep Alone"
7. "I Found Someone"
8. "Bang Bang (My Baby Shot Me Down)"
9. "All I Really Want to Do"
10. "Half-Breed" / "Gypsys, Tramps & Thieves" / "Dark Lady"
11. "Take Me Home"
12. "The Way of Love"
13. "After All"
14. "Just Like Jesse James"
15. "Heart of Stone"
16. "The Shoop Shoop Song (It's in His Kiss)"
17. "Strong Enough"
18. "Save Up All Your Tears"
19. "If I Could Turn Back Time"

Encore

20. "Believe"
Notes
- In 2002, Cher performed "A Different Kind of Love Song", "We All Sleep Alone", and "Save Up All Your Tears".
- "Heart of Stone" was only performed in Saint Petersburg and Halifax for shows in 2004.
- From May 8, 2004, to April 24, 2005, "Love Hurts" replaced "The Way of Love".
- During 2004 concerts, "Song for the Lonely" was only performed in Las Vegas, Glasgow, and Saint Petersburg. As for 2005 concerts, it was only performed starting on April 7.
- Cher performed "Walking in Memphis" during the first two dates in Seattle, until it was permanately added on May 8, 2004.
- During the European leg, Cher performed "One by One", "Taxi Taxi", "Love Is the Groove" and "Love One Another".
- Cher performed "The Power" in Oceania.

== Shows ==
List of concerts, showing date, city, country, venue, opening act, tickets sold, number of available tickets and amount of gross revenue
Date	City	Country	Venue	Opening act	Attendance	Revenue
North America
June 14, 2002	Toronto	Canada	Air Canada Centre	Cyndi Lauper	14,737 / 15,829	$764,144
June 15, 2002	Auburn Hills	United States	The Palace of Auburn Hills	Cyndi Lauper	12,079 / 15,064	$816,903
June 18, 2002	Cleveland	United States	Gund Arena	Cyndi Lauper	13,666 / 16,500	$951,934
June 19, 2002	Columbus	United States	Nationwide Arena	Cyndi Lauper	10,118 / 14,378	$1,000,796
June 21, 2002	Uncasville	United States	Mohegan Sun Arena	Cyndi Lauper	6,672 / 6,672	$581,331
June 22, 2002	Philadelphia	United States	First Union Center	Cyndi Lauper	28,769 / 28,769	$1,942,840
June 24, 2002	Philadelphia	United States	First Union Center	Cyndi Lauper	28,769 / 28,769	$1,942,840
June 26, 2002	New York City	United States	Madison Square Garden	Cyndi Lauper	28,033 / 28,033	$2,083,396
June 27, 2002	New York City	United States	Madison Square Garden	Cyndi Lauper	28,033 / 28,033	$2,083,396
June 29, 2002	Washington, D.C.	United States	MCI Center	Cyndi Lauper	13,592 / 13,679	$942,294
June 30, 2002	Uniondale	United States	Nassau Veterans Memorial Coliseum	Cyndi Lauper	13,003 / 13,003	$918,934
July 2, 2002	East Rutherford	United States	Continental Airlines Arena	Cyndi Lauper	16,600 / 16,600	$1,037,879
July 3, 2002	Manchester	United States	Verizon Wireless Arena	Cyndi Lauper	9,368 / 9,422	$693,207
July 5, 2002	Pittsburgh	United States	Mellon Arena	Cyndi Lauper	11,514 / 13,249	$773,537
July 6, 2002	Atlantic City	United States	Boardwalk Hall	Cyndi Lauper	12,354 / 12,354	$1,065,440
July 8, 2002	Boston	United States	FleetCenter	Cyndi Lauper	27,232 / 28,750	$1,847,262
July 9, 2002	Boston	United States	FleetCenter	Cyndi Lauper	27,232 / 28,750	$1,847,262
July 12, 2002	Grand Rapids	United States	Van Andel Arena	Cyndi Lauper	11,165 / 11,165	$770,494
July 13, 2002	Milwaukee	United States	Bradley Center	Cyndi Lauper	12,981 / 14,754	$854,924
July 15, 2002	St. Louis	United States	Savvis Center	Cyndi Lauper	12,925 / 14,153	$848,364
July 16, 2002	Kansas City	United States	Kemper Arena	Cyndi Lauper	12,217 / 13,625	$804,967
July 18, 2002	Chicago	United States	United Center	Cyndi Lauper	29,804 / 31,035	$2,015,400
July 19, 2002	Chicago	United States	United Center	Cyndi Lauper	29,804 / 31,035	$2,015,400
July 29, 2002	Seattle	United States	KeyArena	Cyndi Lauper	11,750 / 12,102	$793,041
July 30, 2002	Vancouver	Canada	General Motors Place	Cyndi Lauper	11,982 / 14,874	$608,439
August 1, 2002	Portland	United States	Rose Garden	Cyndi Lauper	11,855 / 13,819	$818,024
August 3, 2002	Oakland	United States	The Arena in Oakland	Cyndi Lauper	11,879 / 14,095	$751,206
August 4, 2002	San Jose	United States	Compaq Center	Cyndi Lauper	12,961 / 12,961	$832,113
August 6, 2002	Los Angeles	United States	Staples Center	Cyndi Lauper	11,117 / 16,405	$942,740
August 7, 2002	Anaheim	United States	Arrowhead Pond of Anaheim	Cyndi Lauper	11,117 / 11,323	$826,224
August 9, 2002	Las Vegas	United States	MGM Grand Garden Arena	Cyndi Lauper	26,632 / 26,632	$2,255,649
August 10, 2002	Las Vegas	United States	MGM Grand Garden Arena	Cyndi Lauper	26,632 / 26,632	$2,255,649
August 12, 2002	Phoenix	United States	America West Arena	Cyndi Lauper	14,061 / 14,820	$833,688
August 14, 2002	Salt Lake City	United States	Delta Center	Cyndi Lauper	9,959 / 13,074	$535,121
August 15, 2002	Denver	United States	Pepsi Center	Cyndi Lauper	12,377 / 13,449	$852,902
August 17, 2002	North Little Rock	United States	Alltel Arena	Cyndi Lauper	14,799 / 14,799	$821,866
August 18, 2002	New Orleans	United States	New Orleans Arena	Cyndi Lauper	13,053 / 13,053	$831,611
August 20, 2002	Oklahoma City	United States	Ford Center	Cyndi Lauper	12,906 / 12,906	$898,684
August 21, 2002	Houston	United States	Compaq Center	Cyndi Lauper	11,789 / 11,789	$893,373
August 23, 2002	Dallas	United States	American Airlines Center	Tommy Drake	14,988 / 14,988	$952,310
August 24, 2002	Austin	United States	Frank Erwin Center	Tommy Drake	12,545 / 12,545	$808,986
August 27, 2002	Atlanta	United States	Philips Arena	—N/a	13,848 / 13,848	$944,256
August 28, 2002	Greenville	United States	BI-LO Center	—N/a	10,733 / 10,733	$647,349
August 30, 2002	Sunrise	United States	Office Depot Center	Cyndi Lauper	27,479 / 27,942	$1,853,821
August 31, 2002	Sunrise	United States	Office Depot Center	Cyndi Lauper	27,479 / 27,942	$1,853,821
September 2, 2002	Tampa	United States	Ice Palace	Cyndi Lauper	14,423 / 14,423	$948,516
September 4, 2002	Birmingham	United States	BJCC Arena	Cyndi Lauper	11,970 / 13,649	$788,340
September 5, 2002	Louisville	United States	Freedom Hall	Cyndi Lauper	10,747 / 14,516	$684,339
September 7, 2002	Greensboro	United States	Greensboro Coliseum	Cyndi Lauper	13,406 / 14,922	$770,873
September 8, 2002	Cincinnati	United States	U.S. Bank Arena	Cyndi Lauper	9,081 / 11,270	$658,291
September 10, 2002	Indianapolis	United States	Conseco Fieldhouse	Cyndi Lauper	11,288 / 13,419	$741,724
September 12, 2002	Madison	United States	Kohl Center	Cyndi Lauper	9,802 / 12,980	$667,343
September 13, 2002	Moline	United States	The MARK of the Quad Cities	Cyndi Lauper	10,564 / 10,564	$656,440
September 15, 2002	Minneapolis	United States	Target Center	Cyndi Lauper	13,692 / 13,692	$869,162
September 27, 2002	Winnipeg	Canada	Winnipeg Arena	Cyndi Lauper	10,322 / 11,114	$543,503
September 28, 2002	Grand Forks	United States	Alerus Center	Cyndi Lauper	19,351 / 19,351	$930,190
September 30, 2002	Wichita	United States	Kansas Coliseum	Cyndi Lauper	8,701 / 11,638	$593,559
October 2, 2002	Ames	United States	Hilton Coliseum	Cyndi Lauper	10,151 / 10,244	$659,671
October 4, 2002	Saint Paul	United States	Xcel Energy Center	Cyndi Lauper	13,217 / 13,217	$1,125,000
October 6, 2002	Green Bay	United States	Resch Center	Cyndi Lauper	7,754 / 8,326	$622,148
October 8, 2002	Chicago	United States	United Center	Cyndi Lauper	13,412 / 15,315	$912,728
October 10, 2002	Champaign	United States	Assembly Hall	Cyndi Lauper	8,373 / 16,989	$548,078
October 12, 2002	East Lansing	United States	Breslin Student Events Center	Cyndi Lauper	7,821 / 8,891	$496,061
October 13, 2002	Auburn Hills	United States	The Palace of Auburn Hills	Cyndi Lauper	13,771 / 13,771	$799,098
October 15, 2002	Hershey	United States	Giant Center	Cyndi Lauper	9,406 / 9,699	$667,213
October 17, 2002	New York City	United States	Madison Square Garden	Cyndi Lauper	28,853 / 29,568	$2,177,228
October 18, 2002	New York City	United States	Madison Square Garden	Cyndi Lauper	28,853 / 29,568	$2,177,228
October 21, 2002	Montreal	Canada	Bell Centre	Cyndi Lauper	10,328 / 15,500	$581,600
October 23, 2002	London	Canada	John Labatt Centre	Cyndi Lauper	8,661 / 8,942	$494,234
October 24, 2002	Toronto	Canada	Air Canada Centre	Cyndi Lauper	15,172 / 16,022	$746,041
October 25, 2002	Uncasville	United States	Mohegan Sun Arena	—N/a	—N/a	—N/a
October 26, 2002	Philadelphia	United States	First Union Center	Cyndi Lauper	13,146 / 15,000	$901,500
November 3, 2002	Boston	United States	FleetCenter	—N/a	13,630 / 14,600	$921,835
November 4, 2002	Providence	United States	Dunkin' Donuts Center	—N/a	9,819 / 10,129	$569,233
November 7, 2002	Miami	United States	American Airlines Arena	—N/a	10,857 / 13,480	$573,627
November 11, 2002	Orlando	United States	TD Waterhouse Centre	Cyndi Lauper	11,029 / 11,047	$761,600
November 13, 2002	Nashville	United States	Gaylord Entertainment Center	Cyndi Lauper	13,505 / 14,179	$757,853
November 14, 2002	New Orleans	United States	New Orleans Arena	Cyndi Lauper	11,876 / 11,876	$767,431
November 16, 2002	Bossier City	United States	CenturyTel Center	Cyndi Lauper	11,610 / 11,610	$771,806
November 17, 2002	Houston	United States	Compaq Center	—N/a	11,078 / 11,078	$821,661
November 20, 2002	El Paso	United States	Don Haskins Center	—N/a	7,452 / 7,452	$583,795
November 22, 2002	Dallas	United States	American Airlines Center	—N/a	13,931 / 13,931	$905,540
November 23, 2002	Laredo	United States	Laredo Entertainment Center	Cyndi Lauper	8,846 / 8,846	$667,965
November 25, 2002	San Antonio	United States	SBC Center	Cyndi Lauper	10,259 / 14,948	$656,856
December 1, 2002	San Diego	United States	San Diego Sports Arena	Cyndi Lauper	10,465 / 14,361	$593,681
December 2, 2002	Los Angeles	United States	Staples Center	Cyndi Lauper	10,160 / 17,500	$773,164
December 5, 2002	Anaheim	United States	Arrowhead Pond of Anaheim	Cyndi Lauper	8,930 / 12,174	$679,045
December 7, 2002	Bakersfield	United States	Bakersfield Centennial Garden	Cyndi Lauper	8,720 / 8,720	$511,125
December 8, 2002	Sacramento	United States	ARCO Arena	Cyndi Lauper	12,893 / 12,893	$832,642
December 11, 2002	San Jose	United States	HP Pavilion	Cyndi Lauper	10,860 / 12,802	$716,750
December 13, 2002	Paradise	United States	MGM Grand Garden Arena	Cyndi Lauper	19,046 / 23,130	$1,728,357
December 14, 2002	Paradise	United States	MGM Grand Garden Arena	Cyndi Lauper	19,046 / 23,130	$1,728,357
December 16, 2002	Seattle	United States	KeyArena	Cyndi Lauper	10,291 / 11,264	$682,303
December 18, 2002	Nampa	United States	Idaho Arena	Cyndi Lauper	9,247 / 9,247	$540,972
December 19, 2002	Spokane	United States	Spokane Veterans Memorial Arena	Cyndi Lauper	10,430 / 10,430	$666,800
January 30, 2003	Fresno	United States	Selland Arena	Tommy Drake	7,640 / 7,640	$547,371
February 1, 2003	Tucson	United States	Tucson Arena	Tommy Drake	8,169 / 8,169	$573,950
February 2, 2003	El Paso	United States	Don Haskins Center	Tommy Drake	7,646 / 7,646	$594,355
February 4, 2003	Phoenix	United States	America West Arena	Tommy Drake	11,949 / 11,949	$728,967
February 5, 2003	Albuquerque	United States	Tingley Coliseum	Tommy Drake	8,569 / 8,569	$612,696
February 7, 2003	Lubbock	United States	United Spirit Arena	Tommy Drake	10,416 / 10,416	$638,920
February 9, 2003	North Little Rock	United States	Alltel Arena	—N/a	9,378 / 10,217	$484,568
February 11, 2003	Tampa	United States	St. Pete Times Forum	—N/a	10,659 / 13,797	$708,946
February 13, 2003	Tallahassee	United States	Tallahassee-Leon County Civic Center	—N/a	8,168 / 8,168	$510,143
February 14, 2003	Jacksonville	United States	Jacksonville Coliseum	—N/a	7,927 / 7,927	$452,185
February 24, 2003	Roanoke	United States	Roanoke Civic Center	Tommy Drake	6,890 / 8,272	$391,699
February 25, 2003	Richmond	United States	Richmond Coliseum	Tommy Drake	9,851 / 9,851	$672,787
February 27, 2003	Baltimore	United States	Baltimore Arena	Tommy Drake	9,016 / 10,034	$636,056
March 1, 2003	Lexington	United States	Rupp Arena	Tommy Drake	10,098 / 15,318	$608,012
March 2, 2003	Knoxville	United States	Thompson–Boling Arena	Tommy Drake	10,508 / 11,780	$706,905
March 4, 2003	Memphis	United States	Pyramid Arena	Tommy Drake	12,424 / 15,668	$755,276
March 6, 2003	Lafayette	United States	Cajundome	Tommy Drake	9,836 / 10,001	$639,958
March 8, 2003	Mobile	United States	Mobile Civic Center	Tommy Drake	7,456 / 7,456	$552,769
March 9, 2003	Jackson	United States	Mississippi Coliseum	Tommy Drake	6,199 / 6,199	$458,642
March 11, 2003	Huntsville	United States	Propst Arena	Tommy Drake	6,494 / 6,494	$511,664
March 13, 2003	Oklahoma City	United States	Ford Center	Tommy Drake	11,485 / 19,597	$774,011
March 14, 2003	Wichita	United States	Kansas Coliseum	Tommy Drake	8,405 / 11,638	$547,759
March 16, 2003	Topeka	United States	Landon Arena	Tommy Drake	7,595 / 7,896	$490,159
April 16, 2003	Billings	United States	MetraPark Arena	Tommy Drake	8,254 / 8,530	$586,193
April 17, 2003	Bismarck	United States	Bismarck Civic Center	Tommy Drake	7,728 / 7,768	$538,268
April 19, 2003	Council Bluffs	United States	Mid-America Center	Tommy Drake	14,392 / 14,535	$1,004,565
April 20, 2003	Council Bluffs	United States	Mid-America Center	Tommy Drake	14,392 / 14,535	$1,004,565
April 22, 2003	Charlotte	United States	Charlotte Coliseum	—N/a	—N/a	—N/a
April 23, 2003	North Charleston	United States	North Charleston Coliseum	—N/a	—N/a	—N/a
April 25, 2003	Atlanta	United States	Philips Arena	Tommy Drake	12,847 / 14,130	$872,885
April 27, 2003	Wilkes-Barre	United States	First Union Arena at Casey Plaza	Dom Irrera	8,244 / 8,244	$518,214
April 29, 2003	Bridgeport	United States	Arena at Harbor Yard	Dom Irrera	8,421 / 8,421	$695,036
April 30, 2003	Portland	United States	Cumberland County Civic Center	Dom Irrera	6,568 / 6,894	$463,082
May 2, 2003	Worcester	United States	Worcester's Centrum Centre	Dom Irrera	11,189 / 11,189	$729,569
May 3, 2003	Buffalo	United States	HSBC Arena	—N/a	12,435 / 12,435	$906,583
May 13, 2003	Fairborn	United States	Ervin J. Nutter Center	Dom Irrera	11,223 / 11,223	$650,162
May 16, 2003	Cleveland	United States	Gund Arena	Dom Irrera	15,824 / 16,000	$1,044,401
May 17, 2003	Detroit	United States	Joe Louis Arena	Dom Irrera	14,532 / 14,532	$921,890
June 2, 2003	Trenton	United States	Sovereign Bank Arena	Tommy Drake	15,222 / 15,222	$1,105,200
June 3, 2003	Trenton	United States	Sovereign Bank Arena	Tommy Drake	15,222 / 15,222	$1,105,200
June 5, 2003	Hampton	United States	Hampton Coliseum	—N/a	8,293 / 8,293	$544,012
June 7, 2003	Manchester	United States	Verizon Wireless Arena	Dom Irrera	9,295 / 9,368	$697,968
June 8, 2003	University Park	United States	Bryce Jordan Center	Dom Irrera	11,644 / 11,644	$706,187
June 11, 2003	New York City	United States	Madison Square Garden	Dom Irrera	29,776 / 29,776	$2,266,525
June 12, 2003	New York City	United States	Madison Square Garden	Dom Irrera	29,776 / 29,776	$2,266,525
June 15, 2003	Moline	United States	The MARK of the Quad Cities	Dom Irrera	10,199 / 10,199	$580,005
June 17, 2003	Denver	United States	Pepsi Center	Dom Irrera	12,226 / 12,534	$729,077
June 18, 2003	Billings	United States	MetraPark Arena	Dom Irrera	7,945 / 8,853	$560,013
June 20, 2003	Nampa	United States	Idaho Center	Dom Irrera	9,019 / 9,233	$593,907
June 21, 2003	Yakima	United States	Yakima SunDome	Dom Irrera	6,911 / 7,055	$496,063
July 9, 2003 (Note: The concert on July 9, 2003, at Mohegan Sun Arena in Uncasville was originally scheduled to take place on May 25, 2003.)	Uncasville	United States	Mohegan Sun Arena	—N/a	—N/a	—N/a
July 11, 2003	Atlantic City	United States	Boardwalk Hall	Tommy Drake	12,422 / 12,422	$1,093,440
July 12, 2003	Worcester	United States	Worcester's Centrum Center	Dom Irrera	10,283 / 10,917	$680,910
July 14, 2003	Portland	United States	Cumberland County Civic Center	Dom Irrera	6,466 / 6,466	$487,175
July 16, 2003	Hartford	United States	Hartford Civic Center	Dom Irrera	11,052 / 11,593	$755,279
July 18, 2003 (Note: The concert on July 18, 2003, at Wachovia Arena in Wilkes-Barre was originally scheduled to take place on May 31, 2003.)	Wilkes-Barre	United States	Wachovia Arena at Casey Plaza	Dom Irrera	8,443 / 8,443	$525,294
July 19, 2003	Manchester	United States	Verizon Wireless Arena	Tommy Drake	8,290 / 9,212	$565,990
July 21, 2003	Fairborn	United States	Ervin J. Nutter Center	—N/a	9,599 / 11,223	$448,042
July 23, 2003	Albany	United States	Pepsi Arena	Tommy Drake	11,587 / 11,587	$801,670
July 25, 2003	Rochester	United States	Blue Cross Arena	—N/a	10,570 / 10,570	$826,677
July 26, 2003	Hershey	United States	Giant Center	Tommy Drake	9,735 / 10,027	$722,286
July 28, 2003	Rockford	United States	Rockford MetroCentre	Tommy Drake	7,532 / 7,665	$567,564
July 30, 2003	Grand Rapids	United States	Van Andel Arena	Tommy Drake	11,167 / 11,167	$756,012
August 1, 2003	Columbus	United States	Value City Arena	Tommy Drake	9,384 / 12,607	$608,096
August 2, 2003	Indianapolis	United States	Conseco Fieldhouse	Tommy Drake	9,285 / 13,362	$573,990
August 4, 2003	Evansville	United States	Roberts Municipal Stadium	—N/a	7,404 / 7,723	$447,182
August 6, 2003	Fort Wayne	United States	Allen County War Memorial Coliseum	Tommy Drake	10,305 / 10,305	$587,636
August 7, 2003	Charleston	United States	Charleston Civic Center	Tommy Drake	8,388 / 13,201	$567,118
August 11, 2003	Peoria	United States	Carver Arena	Tommy Drake	9,400 / 9,400	$597,580
August 13, 2003	Des Moines	United States	Veterans Memorial Auditorium	Tommy Drake	8,083 / 8,176	$544,396
August 15, 2003	Minneapolis	United States	Target Center	Tommy Drake	11,911 / 14,391	$797,153
August 16, 2003	Milwaukee	United States	Bradley Center	Tommy Drake	12,302 / 15,563	$761,477
August 22, 2003	Auburn	United States	White River Amphitheatre	Tommy Drake	10,665 / 19,976	$484,981
August 23, 2003	Vancouver	Canada	General Motors Place	Tommy Drake	12,562 / 15,151	$720,568
August 25, 2003	Calgary	Canada	Pengrowth Saddledome	Tommy Drake	13,164 / 13,164	$738,893
August 27, 2003	Saskatoon	Canada	Saskatchewan Place	Tommy Drake	13,045 / 13,045	$719,615
August 30, 2003	San Bernardino	United States	Blockbutser Pavilion	Tommy Drake	10,636 / 20,716	$729,875
August 31, 2003	Paradise	United States	MGM Grand Garden Arena	Tommy Drake	13,555 / 13,555	$1,226,815
September 3, 2003	Fresno	United States	Selland Arena	Tommy Drake	7,412 / 7,590	$543,454
September 5, 2003	Concord	United States	Chronicle Pavilion	Tommy Drake	12,455 / 12,500	$691,312
September 6, 2003	Sacramento	United States	ARCO Arena	Tommy Drake	12,468 / 12,468	$829,183
September 8, 2003	Reno	United States	Lawlor Events Center	Tommy Drake	8,183 / 8,500	$689,307
September 10, 2003	Portland	United States	Rose Garden	Tommy Drake	10,713 / 13,218	$778,050
September 12, 2003	San Diego	United States	San Diego Sports Arena	Tommy Drake	9,631 / 11,432	$571,429
September 13, 2003	Phoenix	United States	America West Arena	Tommy Drake	12,325 / 12,325	$767,084
September 22, 2003	Kansas City	United States	Kemper Arena	Tommy Drake	8,520 / 13,514	$570,174
September 24, 2003	Fort Worth	United States	Fort Worth Convention Center	Tommy Drake	11,356 / 12,476	$728,439
September 26, 2003	The Woodlands	United States	Cynthia Woods Mitchell Pavilion	Tommy Drake	12,384 / 15,914	$757,850
September 27, 2003	Selma	United States	Verizon Wireless Amphitheater	Tommy Drake	11,949 / 20,000	$572,200
September 29, 2003	Albuquerque	United States	ABQ Journal Pavilion	Tommy Drake	12,111 / 12,125	$616,197
October 1, 2003	Colorado Springs	United States	Colorado Springs World Arena	Tommy Drake	7,376 / 7,376	$543,782
October 3, 2003	Omaha	United States	Qwest Center Omaha	Tommy Drake	13,272 / 14,554	$822,239
October 4, 2003	St. Louis	United States	Savvis Center	Tommy Drake	12,399 / 13,936	$828,575
October 10, 2003	Washington, D.C.	United States	MCI Center	Tommy Drake	12,467 / 14,345	$867,117
October 12, 2003	Rosemont	United States	Allstate Arena	Tommy Drake	25,830 / 26,000	$1,772,922
October 13, 2003	Rosemont	United States	Allstate Arena	Tommy Drake	25,830 / 26,000	$1,772,922
October 15, 2003	Norfolk	United States	Norfolk Scope	Tommy Drake	8,152 / 8,446	$490,467
October 16, 2003	Columbia	United States	Colonial Center	—N/a	11,807 / 13,757	$701,391
October 18, 2003	Biloxi	United States	Mississippi Coast Coliseum	Tommy Drake	9,363 / 9,363	$731,527
October 20, 2003	Daytona Beach	United States	Ocean Center	Tommy Drake	8,828 / 8,828	$666,551
October 21, 2003	Pensacola	United States	Pensacola Civic Center	Tommy Drake	7,583 / 7,583	$536,724
October 25, 2003	Sunrise	United States	Office Depot Center	Tommy Drake	12,105 / 12,401	$816,165
October 27, 2003	Pittsburgh	United States	Petersen Events Center	Tommy Drake	8,395 / 8,748	$583,858
October 28, 2003	Reading	United States	Sovereign Center	Tommy Drake	6,720 / 6,890	$499,044
October 31, 2003	Toronto	Canada	SkyDome	Thelma Houston; Gloria Gaynor; Village People	26,127 / 27,320	$1,372,704
January 2, 2004	Las Vegas	United States	MGM Grand Garden Arena	KC and the Sunshine Band; Village People	21,281 / 23,490	$3,145,082
January 3, 2004	Las Vegas	United States	MGM Grand Garden Arena	KC and the Sunshine Band; Village People	21,281 / 23,490	$3,145,082
Europe
May 8, 2004	Dublin	Ireland	Point Theatre	—N/a	—N/a	—N/a
May 9, 2004	Belfast	Northern Ireland	Odyssey Arena	—N/a	—N/a	—N/a
May 11, 2004	Glasgow	Scotland	Scottish Exhibition Centre	—N/a	—N/a	—N/a
May 14, 2004	Birmingham	England	NEC Arena	—N/a	—N/a	—N/a
May 15, 2004	Birmingham	England	NEC Arena	—N/a	—N/a	—N/a
May 17, 2004	Manchester	England	Manchester Evening News Arena	—N/a	13,539 / 13,862	$925,952
May 19, 2004	Sheffield	England	Hallam FM Arena	—N/a	—N/a	—N/a
May 21, 2004	London	England	Wembley Arena	—N/a	—N/a	—N/a
May 22, 2004	London	England	Wembley Arena	—N/a	—N/a	—N/a
May 26, 2004	Paris	France	Zénith de Paris	—N/a	—N/a	—N/a
May 28, 2004	Cologne	Germany	Kölnarena	—N/a	9,541 / 11,547	$610,377
May 29, 2004	Zürich	Switzerland	Hallenstadion	—N/a	—N/a	—N/a
June 1, 2004	Vienna	Austria	Wiener Stadthalle	—N/a	—N/a	—N/a
June 2, 2004	Budapest	Hungary	Budapest Sports Arena	—N/a	—N/a	—N/a
June 4, 2004	Munich	Germany	Olympiahalle	—N/a	7,237 / 10,099	$508,533
June 5, 2004	Frankfurt	Germany	Festhalle Frankfurt	—N/a	7,278 / 10,260	$457,110
June 7, 2004	Antwerp	Belgium	Sportpaleis	—N/a	—N/a	—N/a
June 11, 2004	Hamburg	Germany	Color Line Arena	—N/a	7,635 / 11,709	$458,230
June 12, 2004	Copenhagen	Denmark	Forum Copenhagen	—N/a	—N/a	—N/a
June 15, 2004	Stockholm	Sweden	Stockholm Globe Arena	—N/a	—N/a	—N/a
June 21, 2004	Moscow	Russia	State Kremlin Palace	—N/a	—N/a	—N/a
June 22, 2004	Moscow	Russia	State Kremlin Palace	—N/a	—N/a	—N/a
June 24, 2004	Saint Petersburg	Russia	Ice Palace	—N/a	—N/a	—N/a
June 27, 2004	Leipzig	Germany	Arena Leipzig	—N/a	—N/a	—N/a
June 29, 2004	Rotterdam	Netherlands	Sportpaleis van Ahoy	—N/a	15,209 / 16,000	$780,184
June 30, 2004	Rotterdam	Netherlands	Sportpaleis van Ahoy	—N/a	—N/a	—N/a
July 2, 2004	Monte Carlo	Monaco	Monte Carlo Sporting Club and Casino	—N/a	—N/a	—N/a
North America
July 23, 2004	Calgary	Canada	Pengrowth Saddledome	—N/a	9,545 / 12,263	$601,991
July 24, 2004	Kelowna	Canada	Prospera Place	—N/a	5,072 / 5,072	$374,285
July 26, 2004	Edmonton	Canada	Rexall Place	—N/a	12,760 / 12,760	$784,073
July 28, 2004	Saskatoon	Canada	Saskatchewan Place	Tommy Drake	9,090 / 12,908	$573,634
July 30, 2004	Rapid City	United States	Rushmore Plaza Civic Center	—N/a	7,036 / 7,036	$496,155
July 31, 2004	Sioux City	United States	Gateway Arena	Tommy Drake	8,093 / 8,250	$607,410
August 2, 2004	Ashwaubenon	United States	Resch Center	Tommy Drake	7,536 / 7,754	$606,681
August 4, 2004	Cedar Rapids	United States	U.S. Cellular Center	—N/a	4,896 / 7,944	$419,699
August 7, 2004	Fargo	United States	Fargodome	—N/a	9,729 / 9,729	$462,777
August 9, 2004	Tulsa	United States	Tulsa Convention Center	—N/a	6,553 / 8,972	$469,301
August 11, 2004	Hidalgo	United States	Dodge Arena	Tommy Drake	5,532 / 5,738	$530,658
August 13, 2004	Baton Rouge	United States	Riverside Centroplex Arena	—N/a	6,297 / 7,223	$454,347
August 14, 2004	Biloxi	United States	Mississippi Coast Coliseum	—N/a	8,027 / 9,932	$499,030
August 23, 2004	Hamilton	Canada	Copps Coliseum	Tommy Drake	12,829 / 13,324	$806,920
August 25, 2004	Halifax	Canada	Halifax Metro Centre	Tommy Drake	16,255 / 16,255	$1,033,455
August 26, 2004	Halifax	Canada	Halifax Metro Centre	Tommy Drake	16,255 / 16,255	$1,033,455
August 28, 2004	Uncasville	United States	Mohegan Sun Arena	—N/a	7,840 / 7,840	$468,515
August 30, 2004	Providence	United States	Dunkin' Donuts Center	Tommy Drake	10,114 / 10,114	$637,995
September 1, 2004	Binghamton	United States	Broome County Veterans Memorial Arena	—N/a	5,149 / 5,149	$430,257
September 3, 2004	Erie	United States	Erie Civic Center	—N/a	5,857 / 7,084	$460,801
September 4, 2004	Reading	United States	Sovereign Center	Tommy Drake	6,678 / 6,720	$503,782
September 7, 2004	Toledo	United States	John F. Savage Arena	Tommy Drake	7,533 / 7,533	$529,177
September 8, 2004	Springfield	United States	Prairie Capital Convention Center	Tommy Drake	6,424 / 6,424	$493,273
September 11, 2004	Southaven	United States	DeSoto Civic Center	—N/a	5,310 / 7,686	$394,574
September 13, 2004	Chattanooga	United States	McKenzie Arena	—N/a	6,277 / 7,099	$425,421
September 15, 2004	Winston-Salem	United States	Lawrence Joel Veterans Memorial Coliseum	—N/a	5,090 / 10,423	$328,721
September 17, 2004	Birmingham	United States	BJCC Arena	—N/a	—N/a	—N/a
September 18, 2004	Jacksonville	United States	Jacksonville Veterans Memorial Arena	—N/a	10,846 / 11,663	$704,756
September 20, 2004	Gainesville	United States	O'Connell Center	—N/a	7,371 / 7,500	$539,836
September 22, 2004	Daytona Beach	United States	Ocean Center	Tommy Drake	6,764 / 8,629	$469,961
September 24, 2004	Tallahassee	United States	Tallahassee-Leon County Civic Center	—N/a	5,971 / 8,493	$315,867
September 27, 2004	Estero	United States	Germain Arena	Tommy Drake	11,850 / 11,850	$1,011,858
September 28, 2004	Estero	United States	Germain Arena	Tommy Drake	11,850 / 11,850	$1,011,858
October 8, 2004	Mexico City	Mexico	Palacio de los Deportes	—N/a	33,502 / 36,015	1,550,834
October 9, 2004	Mexico City	Mexico	Palacio de los Deportes	—N/a	33,502 / 36,015	1,550,834
October 10, 2004	Mexico City	Mexico	Palacio de los Deportes	—N/a	33,502 / 36,015	1,550,834
November 5, 2004	Hidalgo	United States	Dodge Arena	—N/a	5,426 / 5,426	$518,807
November 7, 2004	Corpus Christi	United States	American Bank Center Arena	—N/a	7,987 / 8,067	$551,979
November 9, 2004	Beaumont	United States	Ford Arena	—N/a	7,757 / 7,757	$537,570
November 11, 2004	Columbia	United States	Paige Sports Arena	Village People	7,975 / 10,798	$527,672
November 13, 2004	Minneapolis	United States	Target Center	Village People	10,059 / 14,919	$661,758
November 15, 2004	Sioux Falls	United States	Sioux Falls Arena	Village People	6,194 / 6,194	$495,936
November 17, 2004	Duluth	United States	Duluth Entertainment Convention Center	Village People	5,722 / 5,722	$455,264
November 19, 2004	Grand Rapids	United States	Van Andel Arena	Village People	8,174 / 9,669	$557,487
November 20, 2004	Auburn Hills	United States	The Palace of Auburn Hills	Village People	10,089 / 14,101	$677,415
November 22, 2004	Rochester	United States	Blue Cross Arena	Village People	9,249 / 11,118	$661,140
November 24, 2004	Albany	United States	Pepsi Arena	Village People	8,379 / 9,911	$462,417
November 26, 2004	Portland	United States	Cumberland County Civic Center	Village People	5,749 / 6,300	$451,363
November 27, 2004	Atlantic City	United States	Boardwalk Hall	—N/a	12,417 / 12,417	$1,084,495
December 11, 2004	Washington, D.C.	United States	MCI Center	Village People	9,103 / 12,524	$682,293
December 12, 2004	Uniondale	United States	Nassau Veterans Memorial Coliseum	Village People	12,338 / 13,277	$895,582
December 14, 2004	Duluth	United States	The Arena at Gwinnett Center	—N/a	7,500 / 8,500	$525,000
December 16, 2004	Tampa	United States	St. Pete Times Forum	The B-52's	8,917 / 13,471	$682,105
December 18, 2004	Sunrise	United States	Office Depot Center	The B-52's	11,260 / 13,144	$684,663
January 14, 2005	Sacramento	United States	ARCO Arena	Village People	12,423 / 12,423	$860,136
January 16, 2005	Bakersfield	United States	Bakersfield Centennial Garden	Village People	7,328 / 7,674	$456,432
January 18, 2005	Glendale	United States	Glendale Arena	Village People	11,409 / 13,542	$564,895
January 19, 2005	Tucson	United States	Tucson Arena	Village People	6,848 / 8,085	$403,877
January 21, 2005	San Jose	United States	HP Pavilion	Village People	12,421 /12,421	$796,072
January 23, 2005	Spokane	United States	Spokane Veterans Memorial Arena	Village People	9,502 / 12,292	$570,191
January 25, 2005	Portland	United States	Rose Garden	Village People	9,363 / 9,936	$660,363
January 26, 2005	Everett	United States	Everett Events Center	Village People	8,273 / 8,424	$565,103
January 29, 2005	Paradise	United States	MGM Grand Garden Arena	Village People	13,162 / 13,162	$1,124,231
January 31, 2005	Salt Lake City	United States	Delta Center	Village People	9,981 / 13,018	$584,474
February 2, 2005	Colorado Springs	United States	Colorado Springs World Arena	Village People	6,683 / 7,055	$442,551
February 4, 2005	Wichita Falls	United States	Kay Yeager Coliseum	Village People	6,995 / 6,995	$451,859
February 5, 2005	Bossier City	United States	CenturyTel Center	Village People	9,323 / 12,397	$508,529
February 7, 2005	Albuquerque	United States	Tingley Coliseum	Village People	5,994 / 7,522	$372,664
Oceania
February 20, 2005	North Shore City	New Zealand	North Harbour Stadium	—N/a	—N/a	—N/a
February 22, 2005	Christchurch	New Zealand	WestpacTrust Centre	—N/a	6,895 / 7,099	$808,635
February 26, 2005	Melbourne	Australia	Rod Laver Arena	—N/a	—N/a	—N/a
February 27, 2005	Melbourne	Australia	Rod Laver Arena	—N/a	—N/a	—N/a
March 1, 2005	Melbourne	Australia	Rod Laver Arena	—N/a	—N/a	—N/a
March 3, 2005	Sydney	Australia	Sydney Entertainment Centre	—N/a	35,657 / 39,600	$4,167,433
March 4, 2005	Sydney	Australia	Sydney Entertainment Centre	—N/a	35,657 / 39,600	$4,167,433
March 7, 2005	Sydney	Australia	Sydney Entertainment Centre	—N/a	35,657 / 39,600	$4,167,433
March 9, 2005	Newcastle	Australia	Newcastle Entertainment Centre	—N/a	—N/a	—N/a
March 11, 2005	Brisbane	Australia	Brisbane Entertainment Centre	—N/a	—N/a	—N/a
March 12, 2005	Brisbane	Australia	Brisbane Entertainment Centre	—N/a	—N/a	—N/a
March 15, 2005	Adelaide	Australia	Adelaide Entertainment Centre	—N/a	—N/a	—N/a
March 16, 2005	Adelaide	Australia	Adelaide Entertainment Centre	—N/a	—N/a	—N/a
March 18, 2005	Sydney	Australia	Sydney Entertainment Centre	—N/a	—N/a	—N/a
North America
April 7, 2005	Montreal	Canada	Bell Centre	Village People	9,538 / 10,000	$694,477
April 9, 2005	Ottawa	Canada	Corel Centre	Village People	11,953 / 13,056	$765,700
April 10, 2005	London	Canada	John Labatt Centre	Village People	8,499 / 8,499	$575,678
April 12, 2005	Uncasville	United States	Mohegan Sun Arena	—N/a	7,563 / 7,563	$491,141
April 13, 2005	East Rutherford	United States	Continental Airlines Arena	Village People	15,144 / 15,454	$983,664
April 16, 2005	Chicago	United States	United Center	Village People	13,876 / 14,039	$943,316
April 18, 2005	Council Bluffs	United States	Mid-America Center	Village People	6,819 / 7,220	$471,420
April 20, 2005	Winnipeg	Canada	MTS Centre	Village People	11,185 / 11,856	$702,345
April 21, 2005	Regina	Canada	Regina AgriDome	—N/a	5,441 / 5,441	$430,261
April 23, 2005	Victoria	Canada	Save-On-Foods Memorial Centre	Village People	11,583 / 11,889	$920,372
April 24, 2005	Victoria	Canada	Save-On-Foods Memorial Centre	Village People	11,583 / 11,889	$920,372
April 29, 2005	Los Angeles	United States	Hollywood Bowl	Village People	30,982 / 33,528	$2,907,412
April 30, 2005	Los Angeles	United States	Hollywood Bowl	Village People	30,982 / 33,528	$2,907,412
Total					2,972,817 / 3,291,780 (90.3%)	$250,000,000

== Cancelled shows ==
List of cancelled concerts, showing date, city, country, venue and reason for cancellation
Date	City	Country	Venue	Reason
July 8, 2003	South Burlington	United States	Burlington Memorial Auditorium	Venue and stage issues
October 9, 2003	Newark	United States	Bob Carpenter Center	Venue and stage issues
January 10, 2004	Anchorage	United States	Sullivan Arena	Venue and stage issues
January 13, 2004	Fairbanks	United States	Carlson Community Activity Center	Venue and stage issues
January 18, 2004	Honolulu	United States	Blaisdell Arena	Venue and stage issues
June 16, 2004	Oslo	Norway	Oslo Spektrum	Illness
June 26, 2004	Helsinki	Finland	Hartwall Arena	Rescheduling conflict

== See also ==
- List of highest-grossing concert tours by women
- List of highest-grossing concert tours
- List of most-attended concert tours

== Personnel ==
Production Crew

- Tour Director: Doriana Sanchez
- Musical Director: Paul Mirkovich
- Lighting Director: Kille Knobel
- Video Director: Dave Neugebauer
- Assistant Video Director: Deb Collins
- Tour Manager: Nick Cua
- Production Manager: Malcolm Weldon
- Stage Manager: Frank Carra
- Set Designer: Jeremy Railton
- Lighting Designer: Abigail Rosen Holmes
- Video Designer: Christine Strand
- Video Engineer: Jason Harvey
- Production Coordinator: Dana Jaeger
- Lighting Crew Chief: Ian Tucker
- Head Rigger: Steve Olean
- Head Carpenter: Courtney Jones
- Lighting Crew: John Amorelli, Gregg Brooks, Jason Gangi, John Ramsey and Jeremy Schilling
- Video Crew: Richard Davis, David Driscol and Kurt Verhelle
- Riggers: Leti Alcala, Storm Sollars and James Stratton
- Carpenters: Michael Garrigan, Russell Glen, Ken Kinard, David Roth, Rick Stucker and Kurt Wagner

Band

- Keyboards: Paul Mirkovich, Ollie Marland, or Jim McGorman
- Guitars: David Barry and Michael Garrigan
- Bass guitar: Bill Sharpe
- Drums: Mark Schulman
- Backing Vocalists: Stacy Campbell, Patti Darcy Jones, Paul Mirkovich, David Barry, Michael Garrigan, Bill Sharpe, Ollie Marland, and Jim McGorman
- Dancers: Shannon Beach, Bubba Carr, Suzanne Easter, Jamal Story, Sal Vassallo, Dreya Weber, Kevin Wilson and Addie Yungmee
