= Dione Orrom =

Video Director-Producer

Dione Orrom is a Grammy-nominated and Emmy-winning British producer . She is known for her work, including AC/DC Live at River Plate, Queen and Adam Lambert O2, U2 Experience & Innocence, David Gilmour Live in Pompeii, Les Miserables 25th Anniversary, Les Miserables The Concert, Billy Elliot The Musical, Once In A Life Time Sessions Documentary Series, Muse Live in Rome, Elton John Piano, Cher - Living Proof - The Farewell Tour, and Cameron Mackintosh, the First 50 Years.
