= Just Like Jesse James =

1989 single by Cher

Single by Cher

from the album Heart of Stone
- B-side: "Starting Over"
- Released: October 1989
- Recorded: 1988
- Genre: Rock; country rock
- Length: 4:06
- Label: Geffen
- Songwriters: Desmond Child; Diane Warren
- Producer: Desmond Child

Cher singles chronology
"If I Could Turn Back Time" (1989)	"Just Like Jesse James" (1989)	"Heart of Stone" (1990)

"Just Like Jesse James" is a song recorded by American singer and actress Cher for her nineteenth album, Heart of Stone (1989). It was released as the third North American and second European single in October 1989, by Geffen Records. The song was written by Desmond Child and Diane Warren, and produced by Child. It was a December 1989 top-ten hit. The song's title is a reference to legendary Wild West bandit Jesse James. The title phrase previously appeared in Linda Ronstadt's hit "Poor Poor Pitiful Me".

== Song information ==
"Just Like Jesse James" peaked at No. 8 on the US Billboard Hot 100 chart in December 1989, becoming Cher's third top ten single from Heart of Stone in the US. It reached No. 9 on the Billboard Adult Contemporary chart. The song was released in the UK in December 1989 and settled at No. 11 on the UK Singles Chart in February 1990.

Cher has stated during concert performances that she personally never much liked the song despite its successful chart performance.

== Critical reception ==
AllMusic's Gary Hill later noted that this song isn't like the rest of the songs on the album, and called it an "effective ballad." The Daily Vault's Mark Millan described it as "country-tinged", adding that Cher "clearly reveled in singing, and although it's very 'wordy', it recalls the days when Cher had great success in recording songs that told a story like 'Half-Breed', 'Dark Lady' and 'Gypsies, Tramps And Thieves'." David Giles from Music Week commented that it's "a better song than 'If I Could Turn Back Time'. This is Cher in her 'no nonsense' frame of mind as she lambasts her man. Forceful and dramatic; another big hit."

== Live performances ==
Cher performed the song on the following concert tours:

- Heart of Stone Tour (only for a rehearsal)
- Love Hurts Tour
- Do You Believe? Tour
- The Farewell Tour (sung on the first leg, the second leg and the final two shows of the tour)
- Dressed to Kill Tour

== Track listing ==
- US and European 7" and cassette single
1. "Just Like Jesse James" – 4:06
2. "Starting Over" – 4:09
- European 12" and CD single
1. "Just Like Jesse James" – 4:06
2. "I Found Someone" – 3:42
3. "Starting Over" – 4:09

== Personnel ==
- Cher: Vocals
- Brenda Russell, Desmond Child, Diane Warren: Backing Vocals
- John McCurry, John Putnam: Electric and Acoustic Guitars
- Alan St. Jon: Keyboards
- Hugh McDonald: Bass
- Bobby Chouinard: Drums, Percussion

== Production ==
- Arranged and Produced by Desmond Child
- Recorded by Sir Arthur Payson; assisted by Bruce Robb
- Mixed by Mick Guzauski
- Mastered by Dan Hersch; supervised by David Donnelly
- Published by Desmobile Music Co. Inc./SBK April Music Inc./Realsongs

== Charts ==
=== Weekly charts ===
Weekly chart performance for "Just Like Jesse James"
Chart (1989–1990)	Peak position
Australia (ARIA)	14
Belgium (Ultratop 50 Flanders)	38
Canada Top Singles (RPM)	8
Canada Adult Contemporary (RPM)	5
Europe (European Hot 100 Singles)	29
Ireland (IRMA)	10
Israel (Israeli Singles Chart)	7
Luxembourg (Radio Luxembourg)	7
New Zealand (Recorded Music NZ)	16
Quebec (ADISQ)	11
Spain Top 40 Radio (Promusicae)	40
UK Singles (Official Charts)	11
US Billboard Hot 100	8
US Adult Contemporary (Billboard)	9
US Cash Box Top 100	4
West Germany (Official German Charts)	38

=== Year-end charts ===
Year-end chart performance for "Just Like Jesse James"
Chart (1990)	Position
Canada Top Singles (RPM)	80
Canada Adult Contemporary (RPM)	53
US Billboard Hot 100	77

== Certifications and sales ==
Certifications and sales for "Just Like Jesse James"
Region	Certification	Certified units/sales
Australia (ARIA)	Gold	35,000^{^}
New Zealand (RMNZ) digital	Gold	15,000^{‡}
United Kingdom (BPI)	Silver	200,000^{‡}
^{^} Shipments figures based on certification alone.^{‡} Sales+streaming figures based on certification alone.
