= If I Could Turn Back Time =

1989 single by Cher

Single by Cher

from the album Heart of Stone
- B-side: "Some Guys"
- Released: June 20, 1989
- Studio: Criterion Studios (Los Angeles, California)
- Genre: Pop rock; soft rock
- Length: 4:00 (album version); 4:02 (radio edit)
- Label: Geffen
- Songwriter: Diane Warren
- Producers: Diane Warren; Guy Roche

Cher singles chronology
"After All" (1989)	"If I Could Turn Back Time" (1989)	"Just Like Jesse James" (1989)

Music video
- "If I Could Turn Back Time" on YouTube

"If I Could Turn Back Time" is a song performed by American singer and actress Cher from her nineteenth studio album, Heart of Stone (1989). It was released as the album's lead single in June 1989, by Geffen Records. The song was written specifically for Cher by Diane Warren, who produced it in collaboration with Guy Roche. Cher was unmoved by a demo of the song sung by Warren, but Roche insisted she record it. The lyrics talk about the feelings of remorse due to bad deeds and the willingness to reverse time to make things right.

"If I Could Turn Back Time" is a pop rock and soft rock song that features instrumentation from guitars, piano and drums. The song received mostly positive reviews from music critics, who applauded its overall production and Cher's vocal performance, with some considering it to be a highlight of the album. Commercially, the song peaked at number three on the US Billboard Hot 100 and became Cher's first number-one hit in Australia. It also reached the top 10 of the record charts in Belgium, Canada, Ireland, Netherlands, New Zealand, and the United Kingdom.

The accompanying music video for "If I Could Turn Back Time", directed by Marty Callner, was shot on board of the battleship USS Missouri and portrays Cher performing for the ship's crew, wearing a leather thong that revealed her tattooed buttocks and straddling a cannon. Military personnel condemned the video, while some family groups protested against its broadcast, because they deemed it offensive for the Navy and controversial. Following these protests, MTV was forced to air the video after the 9 p.m. watershed.

"If I Could Turn Back Time" has been performed on seven of Cher's concert tours, most recently on the Here We Go Again Tour in 2018–2020, and at the 1989 MTV Video Music Awards. The song has been covered by a number of artists and has also been featured on the soundtrack of Deadpool 2 (2018), among others.

== Background ==
The song was written by Diane Warren, who produced the song along with Guy Roche. While the soft rock track was specifically written for Cher, the singer initially disliked the song upon hearing a demo and turned it down. Warren claimed in 1991: "I got on my knees and pleaded. I told her I wasn't going to leave the room until she said yes, and finally, just to get rid of me, she did." In 2014, she further added: "She really hated [it], but I held her leg down during a session and said, 'You have to record it!'" According to Warren, Cher reportedly responded: "'Fuck you, bitch! You're hurting my leg! OK, I'll try it.' Once Cher sang it, she gave me this look like, 'You were right'."

"If I Could Turn Back Time"
A 30-second sample of "If I Could Turn Back Time", featuring Cher.

== Critical reception ==
Gary Hill of AllMusic retrospectively wrote that the song "has a crunchy texture to it, albeit in a poppy, '80s Starship sort of arrangement." The Daily Vault's Mark Millan noted it as a "soft-rock anthem". Music & Media described it as "a well-produced FM sing-along."

== Music video ==
Cher on tour in 1989 singing "If I Could Turn Back Time"

The music video for "If I Could Turn Back Time", directed by American television director Marty Callner, takes place on board the battleship USS Missouri. It depicts Cher and her band performing a concert for a couple hundred of the ship's enthusiastic crew in white ceremonial dress uniform. The video was filmed in Los Angeles in the middle of the night around Friday June 30, 1989, while the ship was stationed at the former Long Beach Naval Shipyard at Pier D. In the video, the band plays under the main guns on the foredeck, and the ship is rigged with spotlights, light racks and strobes. Cher's son, Elijah Blue Allman, 12 at the time, appears as one of the band's guitarists wearing dark glasses and a Jimi Hendrix T-shirt.

The Department of the Navy had granted permission for the music video shoot because of its potential for boosting Navy recruitment; at the time (1989) the Navy did not have a budget for TV ads. The Navy initially selected the battleship USS New Jersey for the video. However, New Jersey was out to sea when Callner needed to do an initial site survey, so he toured her sister ship, Missouri, instead. During Callner's visit, Missouri's public affairs officer, Lieutenant Mark Walker, convinced him to change the filming location to Missouri.

Cher's Bob Mackie-designed outfit for the original video, a fishnet body stocking under a black one-piece bathing suit that left most of her buttocks (and a tattoo of a butterfly) exposed, proved controversial, and many television networks refused to show the video. MTV first banned the video, and later played it only after 9 p.m. A second version of the video was made, including new scenes and less overtly sexual content than the original. The outfit and risque nature of the video were a complete surprise to the Navy, who expected Cher to wear a jumpsuit for the concert, as presented on storyboards during original discussions with producers. The sailors were already in place and the band had begun playing when Cher emerged in her outfit. Lieutenant Commander Steve Honda from the Navy's Hollywood Liaison office requested Callner briefly suspend shooting and convince Cher to change into more conservative attire, but Callner refused.

The Navy received criticism for allowing the video shoot, especially from World War II veterans who saw it as a desecration of a national historic site that should be treated with reverence: USS Missouri was the site of the Empire of Japan's surrender on September 2, 1945, thus ending World War II.

No Navy officials were disciplined for their role in supporting the video, although reportedly the Secretary of the Navy briefly considered firing the captain of USS Missouri. Other parts of the Navy commended the event.

In 2003, Cher released her Living Proof: Farewell Tour concert on DVD, which included an official "If I Could Turn Back Time" remix video.

== Legacy ==
In 2021, the song's music video appeared on a "Sexiest Music Videos of All Time" list by Rolling Stone magazine. In 2025, Billboard magazine ranked "If I Could Turn Back Time" number 43 in their list of "The 100 Greatest LGBTQ+ Anthems of All Time".

== Live performances ==
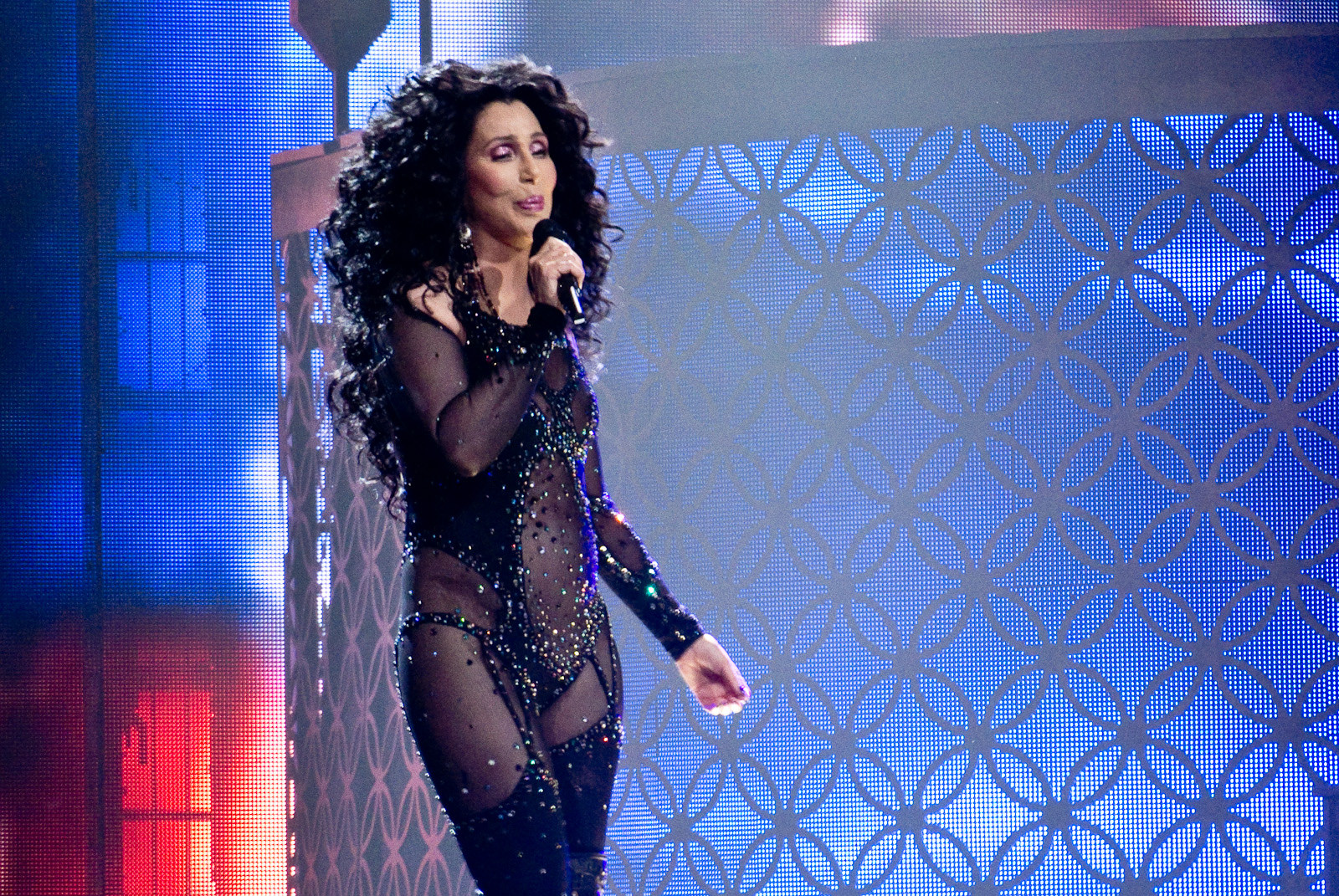
Cher performing "If I Could Turn Back Time" during the 2014 Dressed to Kill Tour

Cher performed the song on the following concert tours:

- Heart of Stone Tour (1989–1990)
- Love Hurts Tour (1992)
- Do You Believe? Tour (1999–2000)
- The Farewell Tour (2002–2005)
- Cher at the Colosseum (2008–2011)
- Dressed to Kill Tour (2014)
- Classic Cher (2017–2020)
- Here We Go Again Tour (2018–2020)

== Track listings ==
- US and European 7-inch and cassette single
1. "If I Could Turn Back Time" (remix) – 3:59
2. "Some Guys" – 3:59
- European 12-inch single
1. "If I Could Turn Back Time" (rock guitar version) – 4:06
2. "Some Guys" – 3:59
3. "Kiss to Kiss" – 4:23
- European CD single
1. "If I Could Turn Back Time" (rock guitar version) – 4:06
2. "If I Could Turn Back Time" (7-inch version) – 3:59
3. "I Found Someone" (7-inch version) – 3:42

== Personnel ==
- Cher – lead vocals
- Desmond Child, Maria Vidal, Michael Anthony, Robin Beck, Jimmy Demers, Jean McClain – backing vocals
- Steve Lukather, Glenn Sciurba, Gene Black – electric guitar
- Guy Roche, Alan Pasqua – keyboard
- John Pierce – bass guitar
- Mark T. Williams – drums, tambourine

== Production ==
- Arranged and produced by Diane Warren and Guy Roche
- Recorded by Frank Wolf, with assistance from Guy Roche
- Mixed by Frank Wolf
- Published by Realsongs

== Charts ==
=== Weekly charts ===
1989–1990 weekly chart performance for "If I Could Turn Back Time"
Chart (1989–1990)	Peak position
Australia (ARIA)	1
Austria (Ö3 Austria Top 40)	14
Belgium (Ultratop 50 Flanders)	6
Canada Top Singles (RPM)	2
Canada Adult Contemporary (RPM)	1
Canada (The Record)	7
Europe (European Hot 100 Singles)	16
Ireland (IRMA)	6
Italy (Musica e Dischi)	25
Italy Airplay (Music & Media)	2
Luxembourg (Radio Luxembourg)	5
Netherlands (Dutch Top 40)	6
Netherlands (Single Top 100)	4
New Zealand (Recorded Music NZ)	3
Quebec (ADISQ)	8
Spain Top 40 Radio (Promusicae)	39
Sweden (Sverigetopplistan)	11
UK Singles (Official Charts)	6
US Billboard Hot 100	3
US Adult Contemporary (Billboard)	1
US Cash Box Top 100	3
West Germany (Official German Charts)	16

2021–2022 weekly chart performance for "If I Could Turn Back Time"
Chart (2021–2022)	Peak position
Canadian Digital Song Sales (Billboard)	28
Poland Airplay (ZPAV)	74
UK Singles Downloads (Official Charts)	71
US Digital Song Sales (Billboard)	37

2026 weekly chart performance for "If I Could Turn Back Time"
Chart (2026)	Peak position
Norway Airplay (IFPI Norge)	59

=== Year-end charts ===
Year-end chart performance for "If I Could Turn Back Time"
Chart (1989)	Position
Australia (ARIA)	5
Belgium (Ultratop 50 Flanders)	53
Brazil (Crowley Broadcast Analysis)	74
Canada Top Singles (RPM)	19
Netherlands (Dutch Top 40)	62
Netherlands (Single Top 100)	37
UK Singles (OCC)	43
US Billboard Hot 100	35
US Adult Contemporary (Billboard)	21

== Certifications and sales ==
Certifications and sales for "If I Could Turn Back Time"
Region	Certification	Certified units/sales
Australia (ARIA)	2× Platinum	140,000^{^}
Denmark (IFPI Danmark)	Platinum	90,000^{‡}
New Zealand (RMNZ) digital	2× Platinum	60,000^{‡}
United Kingdom (BPI) sales since 2004	Platinum	600,000^{‡}
United States (RIAA)	Gold	500,000^{^}
^{^} Shipments figures based on certification alone.^{‡} Sales+streaming figures based on certification alone.

== Appearances in the media ==
The song is featured in a post-credit scene in the 2018 film Deadpool 2, in which the titular character goes on a time traveling spree to change events of the past, such as averting the deaths of Vanessa and X-Force member Peter, and killing his counterpart from X-Men Origins: Wolverine and actor Ryan Reynolds.

In the film Walking on Sunshine, there is a version of this song performed by the protagonists Taylor (Hannah Arterton) and Raf (Giulio Berruti).

The song was used in the 2019 commercial for Luminess Silk Foundation makeup products. In 2025, it was used in an Uber Eats commercial in which Cher herself appeared.
