= We All Sleep Alone =

Single by Cher

from the album Cher
- B-side: "Working Girl"
- Released: January 28, 1988
- Recorded: 1987
- Studio: Electric Lady (New York City); Hit Factory (New York City); Bearsville (Woodstock, New York); A&M (Hollywood, California)
- Genre: Rock; soft rock
- Length: 3:56
- Label: Geffen
- Songwriters: Jon Bon Jovi; Richie Sambora; Desmond Child
- Producers: Jon Bon Jovi; Richie Sambora; Desmond Child

Cher singles chronology
"I Found Someone" (1987)	"We All Sleep Alone" (1988)	"Skin Deep" (1988)

Alternative cover
- Alternative cover

Music videos
- "We All Sleep Alone" on YouTube; "We All Sleep Alone" - Alt. Version on YouTube

"We All Sleep Alone" is the second official single from American singer and actress Cher's self-titled eighteenth album, Cher (1987), released on January 28, 1988 by Geffen Records. The song was written and produced by Desmond Child, Jon Bon Jovi and Richie Sambora. It was remixed over a decade later by Todd Terry for her 1998 album Believe. The single was also released on VHS containing the music video, as directed by Cher herself.

== Critical reception ==
AllMusic highlighted the song on her 1987 self-titled album. Jonh Wilde from Melody Maker commented, "Sleeping alone is really complete crap when you think about it. Also, I'm not sure what Cher is trying to say in the title. Sounds like a bit of a lie to me. The song has an intriguing Death Row atmosphere to it, by the way."

== Music video ==
Cher and Camiletti in the "We All Sleep Alone" video

There are two versions of videos for "We All Sleep Alone". the first is only with Cher and Rob Camilletti in a big bedroom, the second version including a footage from the first and clip with dancers in the streets and her on a stage.

On March 31, 1988, this video was released as a promo on VHS tape in the US. In 2004, it was officially released on DVD in the video compilation, The Very Best of Cher: The Video Hits Collection.

== Live performances ==
Cher performed the song on the following concert tours:

- Heart of Stone Tour
- Love Hurts Tour
- Do You Believe? Tour
- The Farewell Tour (sung on the first leg of the tour only)

== Track listing ==
- US and European 7" and cassette single
1. "We All Sleep Alone" (Remix) – 3:53
2. "Working Girl" – 3:57
- European 12" and CD single
1. "We All Sleep Alone" (Remix) – 3:53
2. "Working Girl" – 3:57
3. "I Found Someone" – 3:42

== Personnel ==
- Cher: Vocals
- David Bryan: Keyboards and synthesizers
- Chuck Kentis: Additional keyboards
- Richie Sambora: Rhythm, lead and acoustic guitars, backing vocals
- Alec John Such: Bass
- Tico Torres: Drums
- Desmond Child, Jon Bon Jovi, Holly Knight, Louis Merino, Nancy Nash, Bernie Shanahan, Joe Lynn Turner: Backing vocals

== Production ==
- Arranged and produced by Desmond Child, Jon Bon Jovi and Richie Sambora
- Recorded by Sir Arthur Payson at Electric Lady Studios, The Hit Factory, Bearsville Studios and A&M Studios
- Additional recording by Rob Jacobs
- Mixed by Bob Rock at Mountain Sound (Vancouver)
- Mastered by Greg Fulginiti
- Published by April Music/Desmobile Music Co./BonJovi Publishing/Polygram Music

== Charts ==
Chart (1988)	Peak position
Canada Top Singles (RPM)	27
Canada Adult Contemporary (RPM)	5
Israel (IBA)	19
UK Singles (Official Charts)	47
US Billboard Hot 100	14
US Adult Contemporary (Billboard)	11
US Cash Box Top 100	12
