= I Found Someone =

1986 single by Laura Branigan

Single by Laura Branigan

from the album Hold Me
- B-side: "When"
- Released: February 7, 1986
- Recorded: 1985
- Genre: Pop rock; electronic rock
- Length: 4:03
- Label: Atlantic
- Songwriters: Michael Bolton; Mark Mangold
- Producers: Jack White; Harold Faltermeyer

Laura Branigan singles chronology
"Maybe Tonight" (1985)	"I Found Someone" (1986)	"Shattered Glass" (1987)

Audio
- "I Found Someone - Laura Branigan" on YouTube

"I Found Someone" is the name of a chart single originally written and composed for American singer Laura Branigan by Michael Bolton and Touch keyboardist Mark Mangold. The song was a bigger hit for Cher in 1987, reaching the top 10.

== Background ==
Though best known for "Gloria", "Solitaire" and "Self Control", Laura Branigan had previously had a major hit introducing the ballad "How Am I Supposed to Live Without You", also jointly written and composed by Bolton, who also later recorded and released his own version of it. That song was Bolton's first huge success after several albums with the group Blackjack and two solo efforts, and it launched Bolton's sideline career working behind the scenes on other people's records. Branigan's version of "I Found Someone" was arranged by German synth whiz Harold Faltermeyer and produced by Faltermeyer in collaboration with Branigan's longtime producer Jack White.

On New Year's Eve, 1985, Branigan performed the song live on The Tonight Show Starring Johnny Carson. It would not be for another two months, however, in 1986, that "I Found Someone" was finally released as the third U.S. single from her 1985 album Hold Me. Without a music video to support it, Branigan's version received only minor success, peaking at number 90 on the Billboard Hot 100. It did better on adult contemporary radio and peaked at number 25 on Billboard 's Adult Contemporary chart. The single's B-side, "When", is a 1980 recording of a song written and composed by Branigan herself, arranged and conducted by Arif Mardin, and produced by Mardin and Ahmet Ertegun. That selection was originally recorded for Branigan's Silver Dreams album, which was later canceled. Fashion photographer Harry Langdon's half-size cover photo featured a dark ¾ length shot of Branigan dressed in black with diamonds dripping from her ears, looking evasively down to her side in front of a shadowy purple background.

Though Hold Me charted well throughout Europe, it would become Branigan's first album not to be certified at least Gold in the U.S., and the "I Found Someone" single marked the end of Branigan's four-album association with Jack White. Her next album would be produced by David Kershenbaum with two tracks by Stock/Aitken/Waterman, though Branigan would go on to record more Bolton compositions, including "I'm So Lost Without Your Love" (from her 1988 film Backstage), and "It's Been Hard Enough Getting Over You" (a cover of a song from Cher, and a single from Branigan's 1993 album Over My Heart). Branigan's recording of "I Found Someone" was remastered twice for hits collections, in 2002 for The Essentials: Laura Branigan and again in 2006 for The Platinum Collection.

== Track listings ==
7-inch single
No.	Title	Length
1.	"I Found Someone"	4:00
2.	"When"	2:43

12-inch single
No.	Title	Length
1.	"I Found Someone"	4:00
2.	"When"	2:43
3.	"When the Heat Hits the Streets"	3:44

== Charts ==
Chart (1986)	Peak position
US Billboard Hot 100	90
US Adult Contemporary (Billboard)	25
US Cash Box Top 100	81

== Cher version ==
"I Found Someone"

Single by Cher

from the album Cher
- B-side: "Dangerous Times"
- Released: November 19, 1987
- Recorded: 1987
- Studio: Power Station (New York, NY)
- Genre: Rock; synth-rock
- Length: 3:43
- Label: Geffen
- Songwriters: Michael Bolton; Mark Mangold
- Producer: Michael Bolton

Cher singles chronology
"I Paralyze" (1982)	"I Found Someone" (1987)	"We All Sleep Alone" (1988)

Music video
- "I Found Someone" on YouTube

Cher and Rob Camilletti in the "I Found Someone" video

The most successful version of "I Found Someone" was released by American singer Cher as the first U.S. and European single from her 1987 eighteenth and self-titled album, and was released on November 19, 1987, by Geffen Records. The single was also released on VHS containing the concert version of the video. Cher's power ballad version was produced by Michael Bolton. Fashion photographer Matthew Rolston's full cover photo featured a slightly overexposed close-up of Cher's face, gazing into the lens as she pushes back a mane of tight curls before a bright blue background.

The song debuted on the UK Singles Chart in November 1987 at number 91 and peaked at number five in January 1988 and spent thirteen weeks on the chart.

Part of a much-heralded musical comeback at the height of her movie career, a big-budget music video featured the singer-actress with her then-boyfriend Rob Camilletti. The couple were a big story in the tabloids at the time, as he was eighteen years her junior, and the video was the aspiring actor's debut. The video was in heavy rotation on MTV and Cher's version went to #10 in the US, making it her first Top 10 in nine years. An alternative concert video features Cher in a dress that was also used in The Black Rose Show in 1980. Actress Virginia Madsen also participates in the music video, playing Cher's rival. This song is written in the key of F major.

"I Found Someone" began a three-album association with Bolton and Cher's other contributors, including Branigan alumna Diane Warren as well as Jon Bon Jovi and future boyfriend Richie Sambora, and their song-writing partner Desmond Child. The recording appears on several hits collections and Cher performs the song live on the DVD Cher: The Farewell Tour Live in Miami and a CD album of the tour. Allmusic highlighted the song on her self-titled album.

=== Track listing ===
- US and European 7-inch single
1. "I Found Someone" – 3:42
2. "Dangerous Times" – 3:00
- European 12-inch single
1. "I Found Someone" (Extended Version) – 4:04
2. "Dangerous Times" – 3:00
3. "I Found Someone" – 3:42

== Personnel ==
- Cher: Vocals
- Phillip Ashley, Jeff Bova, Doug Katsaros: Keyboards
- Steve Lukather, John McCurry: Guitars
- Will Lee: Bass
- Chris Parker: Drums
- Patty Darcy, Vicki Sue Robinson: Backing vocals

== Production ==
- Arranged and produced by Michael Bolton
- Recorded by Michael Christopher at The Power Station
- Mixed by David Thoener at The Record Plant
- Mastered by Greg Fulginiti at Artisan Sound Recorders
- Published by April Music Inc./Is Hot Music/But For Music Ltd.

== Charts ==
=== Weekly charts ===
Chart (1987–1988)	Peak position
Australian Singles (ARIA)	8
Canada (The Record)	17
Canada Top Singles (RPM)	14
Canada Adult Contemporary (RPM)	24
Europe (European Hot 100 Singles)	22
Iceland (RÚV)	3
Ireland (IRMA)	4
Israel (Israeli Singles Chart)	10
Italy Airplay (Music & Media)	8
Luxembourg (Radio Luxembourg)	7
Netherlands (Single Top 100)	94
Spain Top 40 Radio (Promusicae)	34
UK Singles (Official Charts)	5
US Billboard Hot 100	10
US Adult Contemporary (Billboard)	33
US Cash Box Top 100	14

=== Year-end charts ===
Chart (1988)	Position
Australia (ARIA)	33
UK Singles (OCC)	99
US Billboard Hot 100	94

== Other notable covers ==
- In 1999, "I Found Someone" was remade for the Hi-NRG market by Canadian vocalist Barbara Doust as a Logic Records release produced by Vince DeGiorgio. The track was a danceclub hit.
