= The Greatest Hits (Cher album) =

Greatest hits album by Cher
- Released: November 30, 1999
- Recorded: 1965–1998
- Genres: Pop rock; dance
- Length: 72:20
- Labels: WEA
- Producers: Cher; Mark Taylor; Brian Rawling; Peter Asher

Cher chronology
| If I Could Turn Back Time: Cher's Greatest Hits (1999) | The Greatest Hits (1999) | Not Commercial (2000) |

The Greatest Hits is the second European compilation album by American singer-actress Cher, released on November 30, 1999, by Warner Music U.K.'s WEA label. The album was very successful worldwide, topping the charts in Austria, Germany, and Denmark. It peaked at #7 on the official UK Albums Chart, and reached the top 10 in several countries across Europe and the rest of the world. This compilation was not available in the United States, due to the release of the US-only compilation, If I Could Turn Back Time: Cher's Greatest Hits which was released that same year. The album sold 3 million copies as of January 2000.

== Critical reception ==
Professional ratings
Review scores
| Source | Rating |
|---|---|
| Allmusic | 4.5/5 stars |
| New Straits Times | Performance: Sound: |

AllMusic noted that the compilation "samples the biggest hits from throughout Cher's career" but "concentrates the heaviest on her '80s/early-'90s material", adding that it is "not the most logical sequencing in the world", though it "does have all the signature songs in one place", which "may be enough for many listeners". The New Straits Times stated that the album features "multi-million selling, chart-topping singles" that made Cher "one of the most successful performers ever", concluding that "from pop to rock, soul and techno, Cher is winner all the way" and "this is certainly one lady whose lustre has not dimmed with age". In a second review the journal noted that "Believe is not all that bad" and that the compilation has "some other sunny moments", but criticized that "about half the selections are pretty crummy", adding that the older songs retain "a nostalgia-evoking power". Times Colonist wrote that "The Greatest Hits "deftly chronicles said hits" and is "an excellent offering for the gypsies, tramps and thieves in all of us".

== Track listing ==
| No. | Title | Writer(s) | Album | Length |
|---|---|---|---|---|
| 1. | "Believe" | Brian Higgins, Stuart McLennen, Paul Barry, Steven Torch, Matthew Gray, Timothy Powell | Believe | 3:58 |
| 2. | "The Shoop Shoop Song (It's in His Kiss)" | Rudy Clark | Love Hurts | 2:51 |
| 3. | "If I Could Turn Back Time" | Diane Warren | Heart of Stone | 3:59 |
| 4. | "Heart of Stone" | Andy Hill, Pete Sinfield | Heart of Stone | 4:15 |
| 5. | "Love and Understanding" | Warren | Love Hurts | 4:42 |
| 6. | "Love Hurts" | Boudleaux Bryant | Love Hurts | 4:16 |
| 7. | "Just Like Jesse James" | Desmond Child, Warren | Heart of Stone | 4:06 |
| 8. | "I Found Someone" | Michael Bolton, Mark Mangold | Cher | 3:43 |
| 9. | "One by One" | Anthony Griffiths | It's a Man's World | 5:03 |
| 10. | "Strong Enough" | Mark Taylor, Paul Barry | Believe | 3:33 |
| 11. | "All or Nothing" | Taylor, Barry | Believe | 3:58 |
| 12. | "Walking in Memphis" | Marc Cohn | It's a Man's World | 3:44 |
| 13. | "Love Can Build a Bridge" (with Chrissie Hynde and Neneh Cherry) | John Barlow Jarvis, Naomi Judd, Paul Overstreet | Single-release only | 4:13 |
| 14. | "All I Really Want to Do" | Bob Dylan | All I Really Want to Do | 2:57 |
| 15. | "Bang Bang (My Baby Shot Me Down)" (1987 version) | Sonny Bono | Cher | 3:50 |
| 16. | "Gypsys, Tramps & Thieves" | Bob Stone | Gypsys, Tramps & Thieves | 2:37 |
| 17. | "The Beat Goes On" (Sonny & Cher) | Bono | In Case You're in Love | 3:29 |
| 18. | "I Got You Babe" (Sonny & Cher) | Bono | Look at Us | 3:12 |
| 19. | "Dov'è l'amore" (Emilio Estefan Jnr. Mix) | Taylor, Barry | Remix of track from Believe | 3:44 |
| Total length: | | | | 72:20 |

Notes

- "Believe" features writing contributions by Cher, who remains uncredited.

== Personnel ==
- Cher – main vocals, production
- Sonny Bono – main vocals, production
- Mark Taylor – production
- Peter Asher – production
- Brian Rawling – production
- Michael Lavine – photography

== Charts ==
=== Weekly charts ===
Weekly chart performance for The Greatest Hits
| Chart (1999–2000) | Peak position |
|---|---|
| Australian Albums (ARIA) | 5 |
| Austrian Albums (Ö3 Austria) | 1 |
| Belgian Albums (Ultratop Flanders) | 6 |
| Belgian Albums (Ultratop Wallonia) | 7 |
| Canadian Albums (RPM) | 17 |
| Czech Albums (IFPI Czech Republic) | 11 |
| Danish Albums (Hitlisten) | 1 |
| Dutch Albums (Album Top 100) | 2 |
| European Albums (Top 100) | 1 |
| Finnish Albums (Suomen virallinen lista) | 6 |
| French Compilations (SNEP) | 6 |
| German Albums (Offizielle Top 100) | 1 |
| Greek Albums (IFPI Greece) | 5 |
| Hungarian Albums (MAHASZ) | 6 |
| Irish Albums (IRMA) | 7 |
| Italian Albums (FIMI) | 8 |
| New Zealand Albums (RMNZ) | 15 |
| Norwegian Albums (VG-lista) | 7 |
| Portuguese Albums (AFP) | 3 |
| Scottish Albums (Official Charts) | 11 |
| Spanish Albums (PROMUSICAE) | 5 |
| Swedish Albums (Sverigetopplistan) | 4 |
| Swiss Albums (Schweizer Hitparade) | 2 |
| UK Albums (Official Charts) | 7 |

=== Year-end charts ===
1999 year-end chart performance for The Greatest Hits
| Chart (1999) | Position |
|---|---|
| Australian Albums (ARIA) | 56 |
| Austrian Albums (Ö3 Austria) | 50 |
| Belgian Albums (Ultratop Flanders) | 79 |
| Belgian Albums (Ultratop Wallonia) | 75 |
| Danish Albums (Hitlisten) | 19 |
| Dutch Albums (MegaCharts) | 58 |
| German Albums Chart | 73 |
| Norwegian Christmas Period Albums (VG-lista) | 9 |
| UK Albums (OCC) | 30 |

2000 year-end chart performance for The Greatest Hits
| Chart (2000) | Position |
|---|---|
| Australian Albums (ARIA) | 37 |
| Belgian Albums (Ultratop Flanders) | 59 |
| Belgian Albums (Ultratop Wallonia) | 64 |
| Canadian Albums (Nielsen SoundScan) | 175 |
| Danish Albums (Hitlisten) | 38 |
| Dutch Albums (MegaCharts) | 80 |
| European Top 100 Albums | 38 |
| Finnish Foreign Albums (Suomen virallinen lista) | 130 |
| German Albums (Offizielle Top 100) | 60 |
| Swiss Albums (Schweizer Hitparade) | 58 |
| UK Albums (OCC) | 113 |

== Certifications and sales ==
Certifications and sales for The Greatest Hits
| Region | Certification | Certified units/sales |
|---|---|---|
| Argentina (CAPIF) | Gold | 30,000^{^} |
| Australia (ARIA) | 3× Platinum | 210,000^{^} |
| Austria (IFPI Austria) | Platinum | 50,000^{*} |
| Belgium (BRMA) | Gold | 25,000^{*} |
| Canada (Music Canada) | Platinum | 100,000^{^} |
| Denmark (IFPI Danmark) | 5× Platinum | 100,000^{‡} |
| Finland (Musiikkituottajat) | Gold | 37,032 |
| France (SNEP) | Gold | 100,000^{*} |
| Germany (BVMI) | Platinum | 300,000^{^} |
| Hungary (MAHASZ) | Gold | 5,000^{^} |
| Netherlands (NVPI) | Platinum | 100,000^{^} |
| New Zealand (RMNZ) | Platinum | 15,000^{^} |
| Spain (Promusicae) | Platinum | 100,000^{^} |
| Sweden (GLF) | 2× Platinum | 160,000^{^} |
| Switzerland (IFPI Switzerland) | Platinum | 50,000^{^} |
| United Kingdom (BPI) | 2× Platinum | 600,000^{^} |
Summaries
| Europe (IFPI) | 2× Platinum | 2,000,000^{*} |
| Worldwide | — | 3,000,000 |
^{*} Sales figures based on certification alone.^{^} Shipments figures based on certification alone.^{‡} Sales+streaming figures based on certification alone.
