= List of awards and nominations received by Eros Ramazzotti =

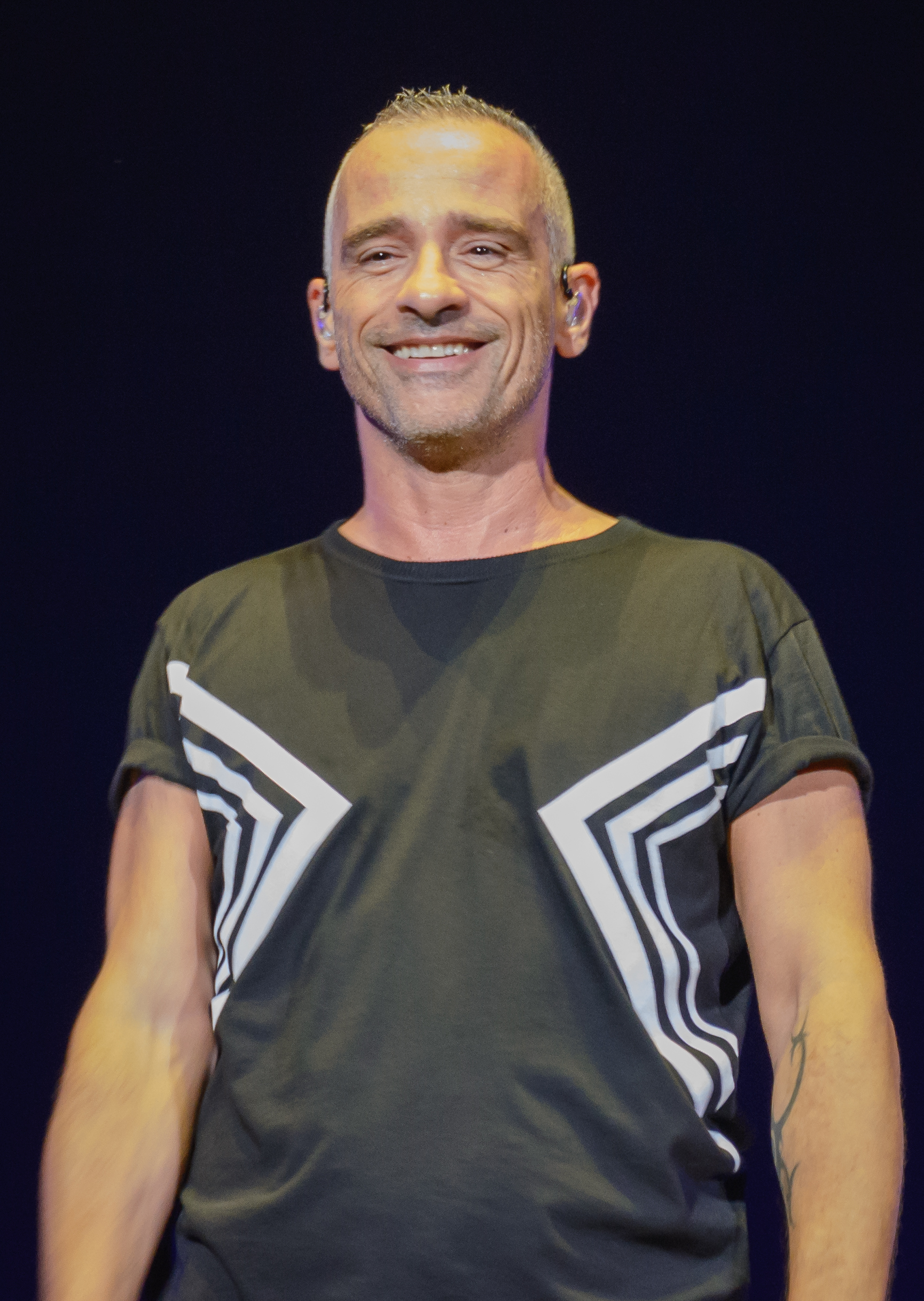
Ramazzotti in 2015

Italian singer Eros Ramazzotti has received many Italian and international awards and nominations for his music work. It includes winning as Best Italian Artist three times (1997, 2001 and 2004) and Best Italian Pop/Rock Male Artist (2003) during the World Music Awards. He also was nominated International Male Artist of the Year six times during the Echo Awards (1997, 1998, 1999, 2002, 2004, 2013).

== BMI Latin Awards ==
Year	Nominee / work	Award	Result
1997	"La cosa más bella"	Award-winning songs	Won
1998	"Estrella gemela"	Award-winning songs	Won
2005	"Una emoción para siempre"	Award-winning songs	Won

== Echo Awards ==
Year	Nominee / work	Award	Result
1997	Eros Ramazzotti	International Male Artist of the Year	Won
1998	Dove c'è musica	International Male Artist of the Year	Nominated
1999	Eros	International Male Artist of the Year	Won
2002	Stilelibero	International Male Artist of the Year	Nominated
2004	9	International Male Artist of the Year	Nominated
2013	Noi	International Male Artist of the Year	Nominated

== Goldene Kamera ==
Year	Nominee / work	Award	Result
2011	Eros Ramazzotti	Best International Music Artist	Won

== Italian Music Awards ==
Year	Nominee / work	Award	Result
2001; February	Eros Ramazzotti	Best Italian Male Artist	Nominated
2001; February	Stilelibero	Best Italian Male Artist	Nominated
2001; February	"Fuoco nel fuoco"	Best Italian Videoclip	Nominated
2001; November	Eros Ramazzotti	Best Italian Male Artist	Nominated
2001; November	Stilelibero Tour	Best Tour	Nominated
2003	Eros Ramazzotti	Best Italian Male Artist	Won
2003	9	Best Italian Album	Won
2003	"Un'emozione per sempre"	Best Italian Video	Nominated

== Lo Nuestro Awards ==
Year	Nominee / work	Award	Result
1994	"Otra como tú"	Video of the Year	Nominated
1997	"La aurora"	Video of the Year	Won

== Los Premios 40 Principales ==
Year	Nominee / work	Award	Result
2008	"No estamos solos" (with Ricky Martin)	Best International Spanish-Language Song	Nominated

== MTV Europe Music Awards ==
Year	Nominee / work	Award	Result
1996	Eros Ramazzotti	Best Male	Nominated

== MTV Video Music Awards ==
Year	Nominee / work	Award	Result
1996	"La cosa más bella"	Viewer's Choice Award for MTV Latin America	Nominated

== Premio Ondas ==
Year	Nominee / work	Award	Result
2012	"Eros Ramazzotti"	Career Award	Won

== NIAF Awards ==
Year	Nominee / work	Award	Result
2008	Eros Ramazzotti	Career Award	Won

== Premio Italiano della Musica ==
Year	Nominee / work	Award	Result
2001	Eros Ramazzotti	Best Italian Male Artist	Nominated
2002	Eros Ramazzotti	Best Italian Male Artist	Nominated

== Premio Videoclip Italiano ==
Year	Nominee / work	Award	Result
2007	Eros Ramazzotti	Special Award for Music-Video Communication	Won

== Telegatto Awards ==
Year	Nominee / work	Award	Result
1993	Eros Ramazzotti	Best Male Singer	Won
1994	Jovanotti Daniele Eros Tour (with Jovanotti and Pino Daniele)	Best Tour	Won
2006	Eros Ramazzotti	Platinum Award for the Italian Music Abroad	Won
2006	Eros Ramazzotti	Best Singer	Nominated
2007	Calma Apparente World Tour 2006	Best Tour	Nominated
2008	e²	Best Album	Nominated
2008	Eros Ramazzotti	Best Singer	Nominated

== Wind Music Awards ==
Year	Nominee / work	Award	Result
2008	e²	Album Award	Won
2009	Ali e radici	Multi-platinum Award	Won
2010	Ali e radici	Multi-platinum Award	Won

== World Music Awards ==
Year	Nominee / work	Award	Result
1997	Eros Ramazzotti	Best Italian Artist	Won
2001	Eros Ramazzotti	Best Italian Artist	Won
2003	Eros Ramazzotti	Best Italian Pop/Rock Male Artist	Won
2004	Eros Ramazzotti	Best Italian Artist	Won
