= List of number-one hits of 1999 (Germany) =

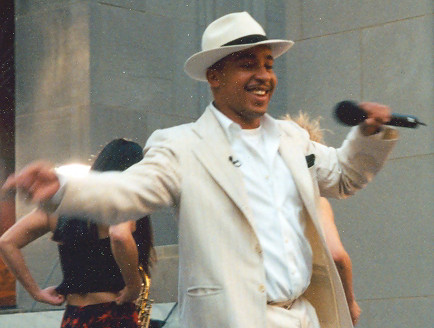
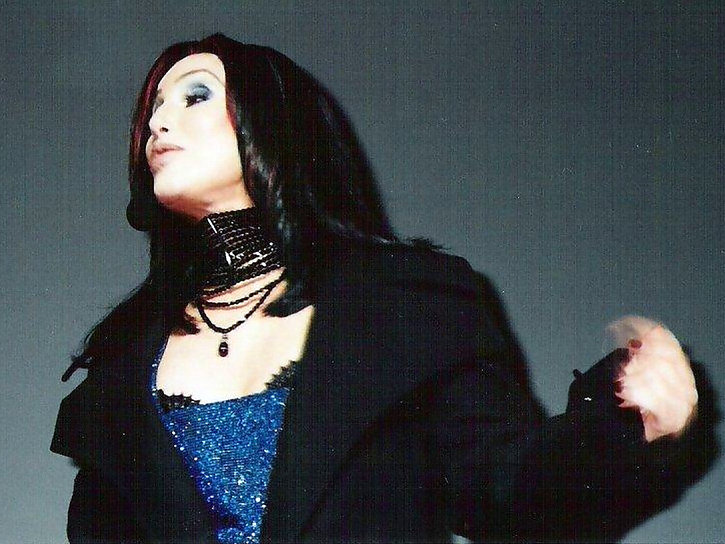
Lou Bega's "Mambo No. 5" became the best-performing single of 1999, while Cher's "Believe" became the best-performing album of the year.

This is a list of the German Media Control Top100 Singles Chart number-ones of 1999.

== Number-one hits by week ==
Key
| † | Indicates best-performing single and album of 1999 |

| Issue date | Song | Artist | Ref. | Album | Artist | Ref. |
|---|---|---|---|---|---|---|
| 4 January | No release (Note: Same issue as for 28 December 1998.) | | | | | |
| 11 January | "Hijo de la Luna" | Loona | | Ray of Light | Madonna | |
| 18 January | "Big Big World" | Emilia | | Ray of Light | Madonna | |
| 25 January | "Big Big World" | Emilia | | Nicht von dieser Welt | Xavier Naidoo | |
| 1 February | "Big Big World" | Emilia | | Nicht von dieser Welt | Xavier Naidoo | |
| 8 February | "Big Big World" | Emilia | | Comics & Pin-Ups | BAP | |
| 15 February | "Big Big World" | Emilia | | Believe † | Cher | |
| 22 February | "Big Big World" | Emilia | | Believe † | Cher | |
| 1 March | "Big Big World" | Emilia | | Believe † | Cher | |
| 8 March | "...Baby One More Time" | Britney Spears | | Alone | Modern Talking | |
| 15 March | "...Baby One More Time" | Britney Spears | | Alone | Modern Talking | |
| 22 March | "...Baby One More Time" | Britney Spears | | Alone | Modern Talking | |
| 29 March | "...Baby One More Time" | Britney Spears | | Alone | Modern Talking | |
| 5 April | "...Baby One More Time" | Britney Spears | | Believe † | Cher | |
| 12 April | "...Baby One More Time" | Britney Spears | | ...Baby One More Time | Britney Spears | |
| 19 April | "Flat Beat" | Mr. Oizo | | ...Baby One More Time | Britney Spears | |
| 26 April | "Flat Beat" | Mr. Oizo | | Nicht von dieser Welt | Xavier Naidoo | |
| 3 May | "Flat Beat" | Mr. Oizo | | Bury the Hatchet | The Cranberries | |
| 10 May | "Flat Beat" | Mr. Oizo | | 4:99 | Die Fantastichen Vier | |
| 17 May | "I Want It That Way" | Backstreet Boys | | 4:99 | Die Fantastichen Vier | |
| 24 May | "I Want It That Way" | Backstreet Boys | | 4:99 | Die Fantastichen Vier | |
| 31 May | "Mambo Nº 5" † | Lou Bega | | Millennium | Backstreet Boys | |
| 7 June | "Mambo Nº 5" † | Lou Bega | | Millennium | Backstreet Boys | |
| 14 June | "Mambo Nº 5" † | Lou Bega | | Millennium | Backstreet Boys | |
| 21 June | "Mambo Nº 5" † | Lou Bega | | Millennium | Backstreet Boys | |
| 28 June | "Mambo Nº 5" † | Lou Bega | | Synkronized | Jamiroquai | |
| 5 July | "Mambo Nº 5" † | Lou Bega | | Synkronized | Jamiroquai | |
| 12 July | "Mambo Nº 5" † | Lou Bega | | Synkronized | Jamiroquai | |
| 19 July | "Mambo Nº 5" † | Lou Bega | | Buena Vista Social Club | Buena Vista Social Club | |
| 26 July | "Mambo Nº 5" † | Lou Bega | | Buena Vista Social Club | Buena Vista Social Club | |
| 2 August | "Mambo Nº 5" † | Lou Bega | | Buena Vista Social Club | Buena Vista Social Club | |
| 9 August | "Mambo Nº 5" † | Lou Bega | | Buena Vista Social Club | Buena Vista Social Club | |
| 16 August | "Blue (Da Ba Dee)" | Eiffel 65 | | Buena Vista Social Club | Buena Vista Social Club | |
| 23 August | "Blue (Da Ba Dee)" | Eiffel 65 | | Buena Vista Social Club | Buena Vista Social Club | |
| 30 August | "Blue (Da Ba Dee)" | Eiffel 65 | | Buena Vista Social Club | Buena Vista Social Club | |
| 6 September | "Blue (Da Ba Dee)" | Eiffel 65 | | Buena Vista Social Club | Buena Vista Social Club | |
| 13 September | "Blue (Da Ba Dee)" | Eiffel 65 | | Live aus Berlin | Rammstein | |
| 20 September | "Blue (Da Ba Dee)" | Eiffel 65 | | Buena Vista Social Club | Buena Vista Social Club | |
| 27 September | "Blue (Da Ba Dee)" | Eiffel 65 | | Freischwimmer | Echt | |
| 4 October | "Blue (Da Ba Dee)" | Eiffel 65 | | Freischwimmer | Echt | |
| 11 October | "Blue (Da Ba Dee)" | Eiffel 65 | | Brand New Day | Sting | |
| 18 October | "The Bad Touch" | Bloodhound Gang | | Hooray for Boobies | Bloodhound Gang | |
| 25 October | "So Bist Du (Und Wenn du Gehst...)" | Oli.P | | Hooray for Boobies | Bloodhound Gang | |
| 1 November | "So Bist Du (Und Wenn du Gehst...)" | Oli.P | | Hooray for Boobies | Bloodhound Gang | |
| 8 November | "So Bist Du (Und Wenn du Gehst...)" | Oli.P | | Turn It On Again: The Hits | Genesis | |
| 15 November | "So Bist Du (Und Wenn du Gehst...)" | Oli.P | | Hooray for Boobies | Bloodhound Gang | |
| 22 November | "So Bist Du (Und Wenn du Gehst...)" | Oli.P | | The Greatest Hits | Cher | |
| 29 November | "Maschen-Draht-Zaun" | Stefan Raab | | All the Way... A Decade of Song | Celine Dion | |
| 6 December | "Maschen-Draht-Zaun" | Stefan Raab | | S&M | Metallica & San Francisco Symphony | |
| 13 December | "Maschen-Draht-Zaun" | Stefan Raab | | All the Way... A Decade of Song | Celine Dion | |
| 20 December | "Maschen-Draht-Zaun" | Stefan Raab | | Unsterblich | Die Toten Hosen | |
| 27 December | "Maschen-Draht-Zaun" | Stefan Raab | | All the Way... A Decade of Song | Celine Dion | |

== See also ==
- List of number-one hits (Germany)
