= Echt (band) =

German band

- Origin: Germany
- Years active: 1997–2002; 2011
- Past members: Gunnar Astrup; Kai Fischer; Kim Frank; Andreas Puffpaff; Florian Sump

Echt was a German pop band from Flensburg active from 1997 to 2002. Their second album, Freischwimmer, charted as no. 1 in the German album charts in 1999.

== Career ==
The group, whose five members were born between 1980 and 1982, started out as a school band at the Kurt-Tucholsky-Schule in Flensburg in 1994. Since 1996, they were managed by Jonas Schäfer, who organised a first record deal. The self-titled debut album, Echt, became a success in 1998 and reached number 5 in the German album charts.

Their greatest success came in 1999 with the second album, Freischwimmer, which topped the German album charts for two weeks and overall stayed in the album charts for 47 weeks. The singles "Du trägst keine Liebe in dir" and "Weinst du" also reached the Top Ten of the German single charts. In 2000, they covered Rio Reiser's song "Junimond" for the soundtrack of the film Crazy and reached no. 12 in the German single charts.

Echt had the image of a boy band with a large teenage female following and was heavily promoted by teenage media. At the same time, the group was hesitant about this image and pointed out to their organic background as a school band in contrast to manufactured boy bands of that time. While they had written some songs on their first two albums, they decided to write their third album, Recorder, by themselves. Despite some good reviews, "Recorder" met with disappointing sales and alienated large parts of the teenage media and fanbase at the time of its release in 2001.

== Disbanding and further developments ==
With declining success and unsure about their further musical development, Echt decided to disband in 2002 and the former band members went on to different careers. In 2011, Echt reunited on stage for a one-time performance at a memorial concert for the late artist Walter Welke.

In 2023, former Echt singer Kim Frank made a rare singing appearance in the ZDF show ZDF Magazin Royale and sang a medley of Echt's greatest hits. Shortly afterwards, the three-part documentary ECHT – Unsere Jugend was released, directed by and from the perspective of Kim Frank, telling the story of the band. The documentary was based on around 250 hours of raw footage filmed by the band members and close friends during the band's existence. In an interview on the occasion of the documentary's release, Frank explained that the band members were still good friends, but that there were no plans for a reunion of Echt.

== Members ==
- Kim Frank (Vocals)
- Kai Fischer (Guitar)
- Florian "Flo" Sump (Drums)
- Andreas "Puffi" Puffpaff (Bass guitar)
- Gunnar Astrup (Keyboards)

== Discography ==
=== Studio albums ===
List of albums, with selected chart positions and certifications
Title	Album details	Peak chart positions			Certifications
Title	Album details	GER	AUT	SWI	Certifications
Echt	Released: 9 October 1998; Label: Laughing Horse; Format: CD, cassette	5	16	—	
Freischwimmer	Released: 10 September 1999; Label: Laughing Horse; Format: CD, cassette	1	6	9	BVMI: Gold; IFPI AUT: Gold
Recorder	Released: 8 October 2001; Label: Laughing Horse; Format: CD, cassette	21	59	—	

=== Live albums ===
List of extended plays, with selected details
Title	Extended play details
Live bei Overdrive	Released: 18 March 1999; Label: Laughing Horse; Format: CD, cassette

=== Singles ===
List of singles, with selected chart positions and certifications
Title	Year	Peak chart positions			Certifications	Album
Title	Year	GER	AUT	SWI	Certifications	Album
"Alles wird sich ändern"	1998	55	26	—		Echt
"Wir haben’s getan"	1998	23	17	—		Echt
"Wo bist du jetzt?"	1998	20	22	29		Echt
"Fort von mir"	1999	30	—	—		Echt
"Du trägst keine Liebe in dir"	1999	7	10	17	BVMI: Gold	Freischwimmer
"Weinst du"	1999	7	15	11		Freischwimmer
"Junimond"	2000	12	29	37		Crazy soundtrack
"2010"	2000	88	—	—		Freischwimmer
"Wie geht es dir so?"	2001	55	—	—		Recorder
"Stehengeblieben"	2002	—	—	—		Recorder

=== Samplers ===
- 1999: POP 2000 / Das Gibts Nur Einmal (König von Deutschland)
- 2000: Crazy, Original Soundtrack (Junimond)

=== DVD ===
- 2000: Crazy Platinum Edition (with 6 live videos, making of "Junimond", and "Junimond" music video)
