= Believe (Cher album) =

Studio album by Cher
- Released: October 22, 1998
- Recorded: 1998
- Studios: Dreamhouse (London); Soundworks (New York City)
- Genre: Eurodisco
- Length: 43:55
- Labels: WEA; Warner Bros.
- Producers: Mark Taylor; Brian Rawling; Junior Vasquez; Todd Terry; Jon Bon Jovi; Richie Sambora; Desmond Child

Cher chronology
It's a Man's World (1995)	Believe (1998)	If I Could Turn Back Time: Cher's Greatest Hits (1999)

Singles from Believe
- 1. "Believe" Released: October 19, 1998; 2. "Strong Enough" Released: February 19, 1999; 3. "All or Nothing" Released: June 7, 1999; 4. "Dov'è l'amore" Released: October 25, 1999

Believe is the twenty-second studio album by American singer and actress Cher, released on October 22, 1998, by WEA and Warner Bros. Records. Following the commercial disappointment of her previous studio album It's a Man's World (1995), her record company encouraged her to record a dance-oriented album, in order to move into a more mainstream sound. Cher started working on the album in the spring of 1998 with British producers Mark Taylor and Brian Rawling at the Dreamhouse Studios in London. The album was dedicated to her former husband Sonny Bono, who had died earlier that year.

"Believe", along with "Strong Enough", represents a complete musical departure from her previous works, consisting of Eurodisco-oriented styles, while its lyrical topics include freedom, individualism and relationships. The album features some of the new technology of the time, like the usage of Auto-Tune, which would eventually become known as the "Cher effect". Upon release, the album received mixed reviews from music critics, who commended Cher's vocal performance, while others criticized the high amount of Auto-Tune and its overall production. In 2000, Believe was nominated for Grammy Award for Best Pop Vocal Album.

Commercially, Believe proved to be extremely successful, peaking at number four on the Billboard 200 and was certified quadruple platinum by the Recording Industry Association of America (RIAA) for shipments of four million copies across the United States. The album topped the charts in Austria, Canada, Denmark, Germany, Greece, New Zealand, Portugal, and Quebec, as well as in the top ten in France, Spain, United Kingdom, and several other international territories. As of 2023, Believe has sold over 11 million copies worldwide.

Four singles were released from the album. The first single, "Believe", topped the charts in a total of 21 countries, including the Billboard Hot 100, where it stayed at number one for four weeks. "Strong Enough" was released as the second single from the album; it peaked at numbers 57 and 5 in the US and UK, respectively. "All or Nothing" and "Dov'è l'amore" were released as the third and fourth singles respectively, both becoming moderately successful. In support of Believe, Cher embarked on her fourth concert tour, Do You Believe?, which became one of the highest-grossing tours ever for a female artist at that time. In celebration of the album's twenty-fifth anniversary a deluxe edition was released on November 3, 2023.

== Background ==
After Cher's previous rock-inflected album It's a Man's World (1995) received a lukewarm response, Warner Music UK head Rob Dickins suggested that Cher record a dance album to better connect with her gay audience. Initially, Cher expressed reluctance, stating that she no longer found dance music appealing, as she felt it lacked "real songs". However, interest in Cher's potential as a dance artist had already been growing. A remix of her 1996 single "One by One" by New York City DJ Junior Vasquez had found success in the club scene and highlighted a demand for Cher in the genre. DMA magazine's Dean Ferguson observed that the remix left fans "starving for a dance mix from Cher", prompting Warner to push for a dance-oriented album.

Around this time, Dickins came across songwriter Brian Higgins at Warner's London office and asked him to pitch songs for the project. Three days later, a tape with sixteen of Higgins's songs arrived. Reflecting on the demo, Dickins recalled, "The ninth song was 'Believe.' I thought: 'Cher could do this chorus, especially the lyrics, with her private life the way it is. She's gone through all these things.'" When Dickins asked the songwriter to complete "Believe", the result was a "terrible" song that still needed extensive work.

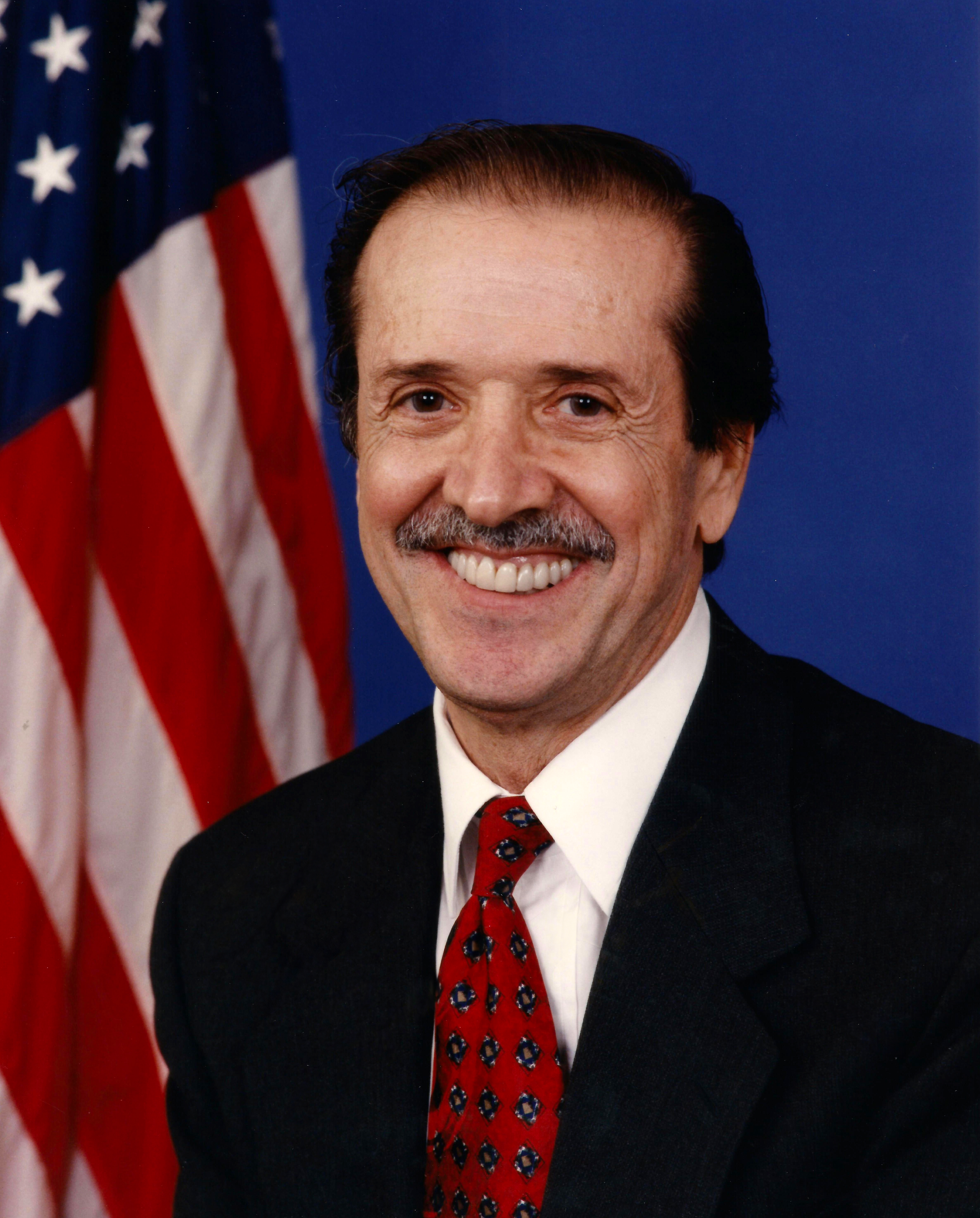
The album was dedicated to musician Sonny Bono, Cher's former husband and musical partner, who had died on January 5, 1998, in a skiing accident.

Cher began working on Believe in the summer of 1998 in London, meeting with producers Mark Taylor and Brian Rawling, who had previously worked with Dickins; additional producers included Todd Terry ("Taxi Taxi") and Junior Vasquez, who had originally worked on "Dov'è l'amore", but when he sent back his version from New York, it was rejected by Dickins, who decided instead to give the production of the track to Taylor and Rawling as well. Cher also worked with long-time collaborator Diane Warren (who wrote "Takin' Back My Heart") and covered two songs: "The Power" (Amy Grant) and "Love Is the Groove" (Betsy Cook). Furthermore, she decided to include a remix of her 1988 single "We All Sleep Alone" from her 1987 Cher album.

The "Believe" single was originally written only by Brian Higgins, Matt Gray, Stuart McLennen and Tim Powell, and circulated at Warner Bros. as an unwanted demo for months. Mark Taylor said, "Everyone loved the chorus but not the rest of the song; As we were already writing other songs for Cher, Rob asked us if we could sort it out. Two of our writers, Steve Torch and Paul Barry, got involved and eventually came up with a complete song that Rob and Cher were happy with."

== Release and promotion ==
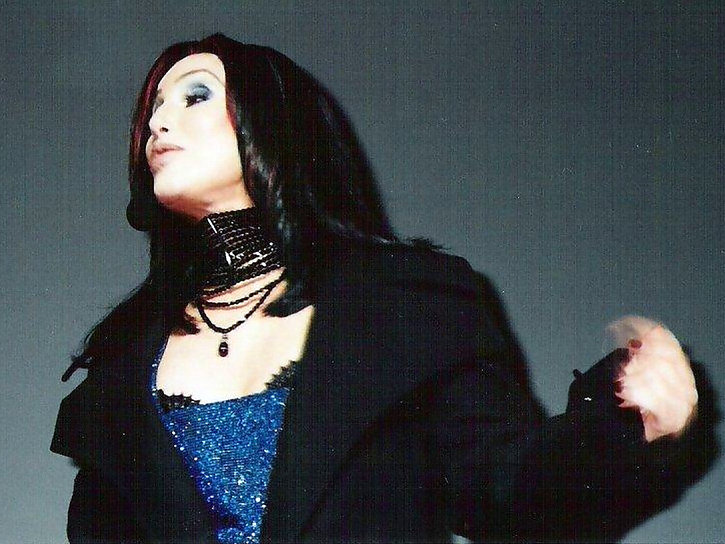
Cher performing "Believe" on the WKTU's "Miracle on 34th Street" show in New York City on December 11, 1998

Believe was first released in France on October 22, 1998, in the United Kingdom on October 26, 1998, and in the United States on November 10, 1998. The album was later released in Japan on December 23, 1998, with two additional Japan-only bonus tracks "Believe" (Club 69 Future Mix) and "Believe" (Xenomania Mix).

To promote the album, Cher made a number of televised appearances and live performances of the album's singles. On October 17, 1998, she debuted "Believe" at Heaven nightclub in London, England and on The National Lottery Show. "Believe" was also performed seven times on Top of the Pops and the 1999 Brit Awards (February 16, 1999) in the UK, Kultnacht and Top of the Pops in Germany (1998), ¿Qué apostamos? in Spain (November 6, 1998), the Rosie O'Donnell Show (November 17), the Late Show with David Letterman (November 18), the 26th Annual American Music Awards (January 11, 1999) in the United States and the 1999 Sanremo Music Festival in Italy (February 23, 1999), among others. "Strong Enough" was sung for the first time on Top of the Pops (March 3, 1999) in the UK, at the Echo Music Prize (March 4) in Germany and Tapis Rougue (March 13, 1999) in France. "Believe" and "Strong Enough" were also sung at the 1999 World Music Awards in Monte Carlo on May 5, 1999. "All or Nothing" was sung on Top of the Pops (June 11, 1999) while "Dov'è l'Amore" on The National Lottery Show in the UK.

Cher performed "Believe", "The Power", "All or Nothing", "Strong Enough", "Dov'è l'Amore" and "Love Is the Groove" on the Do You Believe? (tour), her fourth concert tour, which promoted Believe. It started on June 16, 1999, and was Cher's first tour in seven years. The tour received positive reviews, was a commercial success and was sold out in every American city it was booked in, amassing a global audience of more than 1.5 million. Its companion television special, Cher: Live in Concert – From the MGM Grand in Las Vegas (1999), was the highest rated original HBO program in 1998–99, registering a 9.0 rating among adults 18 to 49 and a 13.0 rating in the HBO universe of about 33 million homes. Its parent Live in Concert VHS/DVD was released in all regions in December 1999.

== Singles ==
"Believe" (1998)
"Believe" features the pioneering use of Auto-Tune, also known as the "Cher effect".

"Believe" without Auto-Tune
For comparison, Auto-Tune is not applied in this section.

"Believe" was released as the lead single from the album on October 19, 1998. It peaked at number one in more than 20 countries, including Australia, Canada, France, Germany, Italy, Spain and the United Kingdom, where it became Cher's first single to debut at number one and spent seven weeks at the summit at the end of 1998, becoming the biggest-selling single by a female artist in UK history, selling over 1.84 million copies in the country. It also topped the United States' Billboard Hot 100 chart for four weeks, selling over 1.8 million units in the country as of December 1999, and earned Cher a place in the Guinness Book of World Records as the oldest female solo artist to top the chart. It remains the Cher's most successful single to date, and one of the best-selling singles of all time, with sales of over 10 million copies worldwide. "Believe" received critical acclaim, and has an electronic vocal effect proposed by Cher, and was the first commercial recording to feature Auto-Tune—an audio processor originally intended to disguise or correct off-key inaccuracies in vocal music recordings—as a deliberate creative effect; after the success of the song, the technique became known as the "Cher effect" and has since been widely used in popular music.

The album's second single, "Strong Enough", was released on February 19, 1999. It peaked at number one in Hungary and attained a top ten position in Austria, Belgium, Denmark, Finland, France, Germany, Italy, New Zealand, Spain, Switzerland and the United Kingdom. Due to a "loss" of radio airplay and promotion, the song had a modest success in the United States, peaking at number fifty-seven on the Billboard Hot 100, while reaching the number one on the Hot Dance Club Play chart for one week.

"All or Nothing" was released on June 7, 1999, as the third single outside the United States. It peaked inside the top five in Finland, Hungary and the Czech Republic; the song had a moderate success on the charts elsewhere, peaking at number twelve on the UK Singles Chart, while reaching number fourteen in Denmark. "Dov'è l'amore" was released as the album's fourth and final single on October 25, 1999. It became a top-ten hit in Finland, Greece, Italy and Spain. Along with its predecessor, the song was released in the United States as a maxi single, but failed to reach the Hot 100. "All or Nothing" and "Dov'è l'amore" peaked separately on the Hot Dance Club Play at number one and number five respectively.

== Critical reception ==
Professional ratings
Review scores
Source	Rating
AllMusic	2.5/5 stars
The Encyclopedia of Popular Music	3/5 stars
Entertainment Weekly	B−
Christgau's Consumer Guide: Albums of the '90s	(choice cut)
The Rolling Stone Album Guide	2/5 stars

Upon release, the album received mixed responses from international music critics. AllMusic's Michael Gallucci called Believe Cher's "latest playground move" and said that she "merely moves through the beat factory with one drab vocal range into one endless, and personality-free, thump session" and "determinedly, if not wholeheartedly, clinging to the tail end of it". In his review he gave the album two-and-a-half out of five stars. The major criticism was the strong use of Auto-Tune which changed Cher's voice. Beth Johnson of Entertainment Weekly gave it a B− rating, stating, "Believe is erratic (and sometimes cheesy) as hell, but you gotta love how her Cher-ness shines." Music critic Robert Christgau ranked the album as a choice cut, which means that the reviewer believes there is a good track, in this case, "Believe", on an album that is "not particularly good."

== Commercial performance ==
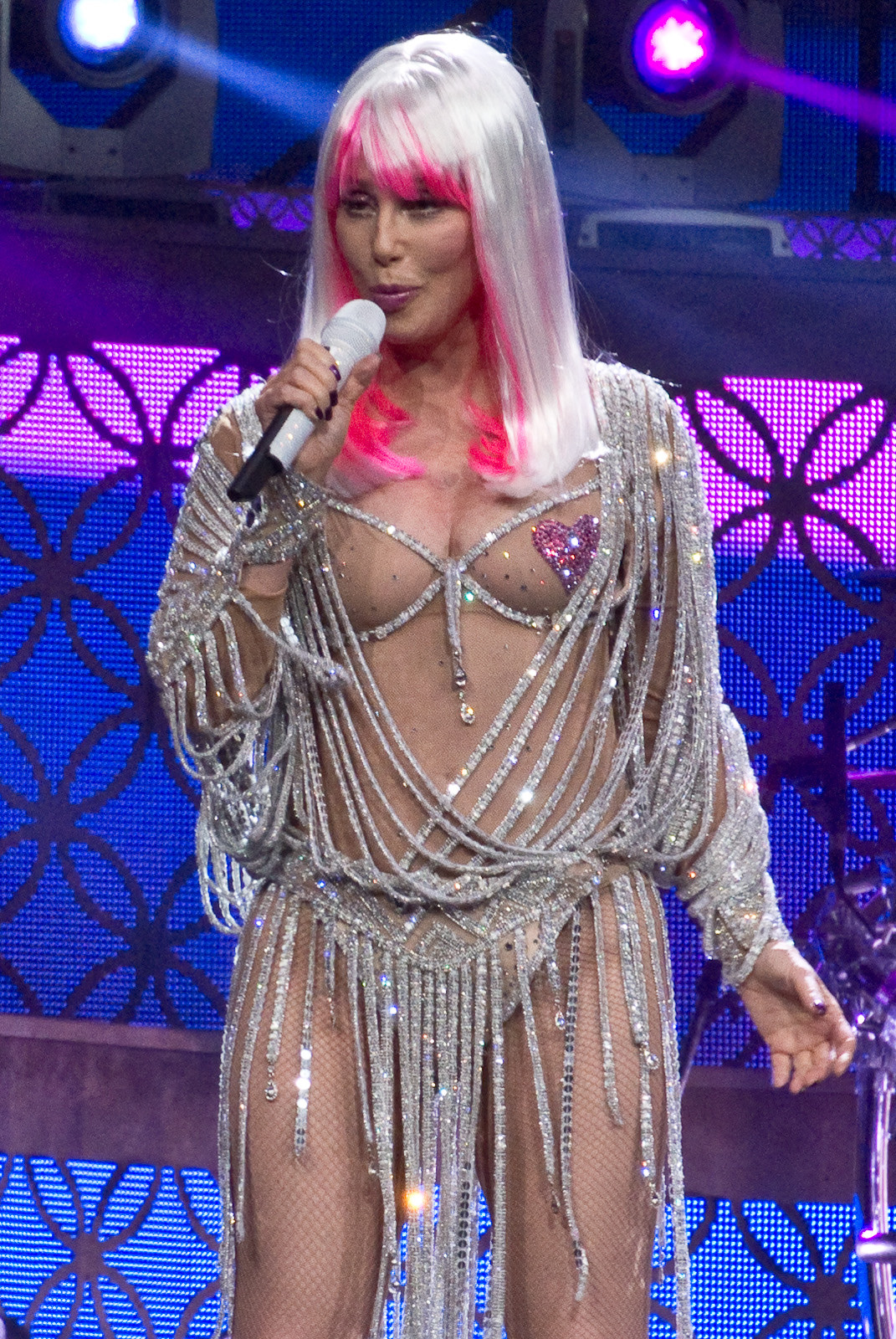
Cher performing the album's lead single "Believe" on the Dressed to Kill Tour in 2014

In the United States, Believe debuted at number 139 on the Billboard 200 albums chart on the issue dated November 28, 1998. The album had a slow and steady climb, and peaked at number four on the issue dated May 8, 1999, becoming Cher's highest-peaking solo album up to that point; it also became her second solo Top 10 album, and third overall. The album spent a total of 76 weeks on the chart. On December 23, 1999, the album was certified four times platinum by the Recording Industry Association of America (RIAA) for shipments of four million units. According to Nielsen SoundScan, Believe had sold 3.6 million copies in the United States as of August 2015. It remains Cher's best-selling album in the United States. In Canada, the album peaked at number one on the Canadian Albums Chart on the issue dated January 25, 1999, where it remained for one week. The album was present for a total of 26 weeks on the chart and was later certified six times platinum by the Canadian Recording Industry Association (CRIA) for shipment of 600,000 copies. The album also achieved commercial success in Oceania, peaking at number one on the albums chart in New Zealand and number thirteen in Australia. It was certified double platinum by Australian Recording Industry Association (ARIA) and two times platinum by Recording Industry Association of New Zealand (RIANZ) for shipments of 140,000 and 30,000 copies respectively.

In the United Kingdom, Believe debuted at number eight on the UK Albums Chart, becoming her fifth consecutive album to peak inside the Top 10 in the country; it eventually peaked at number seven on the issue dated March 20, 1999. It was certified double platinum by the British Phonographic Industry (BPI) for shipment of 600.000 copies. In France, the album peaked the albums chart at number five, staying for forty-seven weeks in the chart. It was certified platinum by the Syndicat National de l'Édition Phonographique (SNEP) for shipments of 500,000 copies. Actual sales of the album in France stand at 555,300 copies. In Germany, the album reached number one on the Media Control Charts and remained there for four weeks. It remains Cher's best-selling album in Germany with two times platinum certification from Bundesverband Musikindustrie (BVMI) for shipment of one million copies. Due to its commercial success in European countries, the album ultimately topped the European Top 100 Albums chart for eight consecutive weeks and was certified four times platinum by the International Federation of the Phonographic Industry (IFPI) for sales of four million copies, becoming the best selling album in Europe of the year. Believe achieved similar success in the rest of world, topping the official charts of Austria, Denmark, Greece and Portugal and went on to be certified gold or platinum in 39 countries around the world. In total, Believe has sold over 11 million copies worldwide and became Cher's best-selling album.

== Accolades ==
At the 42nd Annual Grammy Awards, Believe received one award out of three nominations. The album was nominated for Best Pop Album, while the title track won Best Dance Recording and was nominated for Record of the Year. The song gave Cher her first Grammy of her career. "Believe" was also nominated for Best Dance Video and Best Editing at the 1999 MTV Video Music Awards. At the 1999 Billboard Music Awards Cher was nominated Top Female Artist and Female Hot 100 Artist of the Year, while "Believe" won the Hot 100 Single of the Year; its music video was nominated Best Dance Clip at the 1999 Billboard Music Video Awards.

Believe also gave Cher several trophies from various international award shows—including an Anděl Awards for Best Foreign Female Singer in Czech Republic, a Danish Grammy Awards for Best International Hit ("Believe") from IFPI Denmark, a Midem's Dance d'Or for Best International Single ("Believe") in France, an ECHO Award for International Female Artist in Germany, a Hungarian Award for Foreign Pop Album of the Year, an Hit Award nomination for International Artist of the Year in Norway, two Premios Amigo for Best International Female Solo Artist and Best International Album in Spain, a Mnet Asian Music Awards, otherwise abbreviated as MAMA for Best International Artist in South Korea and a Music Control Airplay Awards (MCAW) as the Most Played International Artist in Sweden, among others. "Believe" also won three British Ivor Novello Awards for International Hit of the Year, Best Song Musically and Lyrically and Best Selling UK Single. At the 14th annual International Dance Music Awards, Cher won Best Hi NRG 12-inch and Best Pop 12-inch Dance Record for "Believe".

== Track listing ==
Believe – Standard edition
No.	Title	Writer(s)	Producer(s)	Length
1.	"Believe"	Brian Higgins; Stuart McLennen; Paul Barry; Steven Torch; Matthew Gray; Timothy Powell	Mark Taylor; Brian Rawling	3:59
2.	"The Power"	Tommy Simms; Judson Spence	Junior Vasquez	3:56
3.	"Runaway"	Taylor; Barry	Taylor; Rawling	4:46
4.	"All or Nothing"	Taylor; Barry	Taylor; Rawling	3:58
5.	"Strong Enough"	Taylor; Barry	Taylor; Rawling	3:43
6.	"Dov'è l'amore"	Taylor; Barry	Taylor; Rawling	4:17
7.	"Takin' Back My Heart"	Diane Warren	Taylor; Rawling	4:32
8.	"Taxi Taxi"	Todd Terry; Mark Jordan	Terry	5:04
9.	"Love Is the Groove"	Betsy Cook; Bruce Woolley	Terry	4:29
10.	"We All Sleep Alone"	Desmond Child; Jon Bon Jovi; Richie Sambora	Terry	5:11
Total length:				43:55

Believe – Japanese/Australasian bonus track edition
No.	Title	Writer(s)	Producer(s)	Length
11.	"Believe" (Club 69 future mix)	Higgins; McLennen; Barry; Torch; Gray; Powell	Peter Rauhofer	9:18
12.	"Believe" (Xenomania mix)	Higgins; McLennen; Barry; Torch; Gray; Powell	Xenomania	4:22
Total length:				57:40

Believe – 25th anniversary deluxe edition second disc
No.	Title	Producer(s)	Length
1.	"Believe" (Almighty definitive mix)	Almighty	7:36
2.	"Believe" (Club 69 future anthem mix)	Rauhofer	9:25
3.	"Believe" (Phat 'n' Phunky club mix)	Phat 'n' Phunky	7:44
4.	"Strong Enough" (Club 69 phunk mix)	Rauhofer	8:33
5.	"Strong Enough" (male version)	Taylor; Rawling	3:32
6.	"Strong Enough" (Pumpin' Dolls radio edit)	Pumpin' Dolls	3:47
7.	"All or Nothing" (Almighty radio edit)	Almighty	3:37
8.	"All or Nothing" (Metro mix)	Walter Turbitt	3:58
9.	"All or Nothing" (Danny Tenaglia inchermental)	Danny Tenaglia	7:41
10.	"Dov'è l'amore" (Emilio Estefan Jr. extended mix)	Emilio Estefan; Lawrence Derner	5:39
11.	"Dov'è l'amore" (Tony Moran's anthem 7" mix)	Tony Moran	3:31
12.	"Dov'è l'amore" (Tee's radio one instrumental)	Terry	3:19
13.	"Dov'è l'amore" (Ray Roc's latin soul instrumental)	Ray Roc	9:07

Notes

- "Believe" contains lyrics written and rearranged by Cher, who remains uncredited for her contribution.

== Personnel ==
Adapted from AllMusic.

- Tracy Ackerman – background vocals
- Chris Anderson – piano
- Ryan Art – design
- Kevyn Aucoin – make-up
- Paul Barry – background vocals
- Jeffrey Bernstein – programming
- Winston Blissett – bass
- Jon Bon Jovi – producer
- Johan Brunkvist – keyboards
- Colleen Callaghan – hair stylist
- Cher – primary artist
- Desmond Child – producer
- Rob Dickins – executive producer
- Ada Dyer – background vocals
- Humberto Gatica – mixing
- Marc Goodman – engineer
- Marlon Graves – guitar
- Matthias Heilbronn – editing, programming
- Sylvia Mason-James – background vocals
- Bill Klatt – engineer
- Michael Lavine – photography
- Eddie Martinez – guitar
- P. Dennis Mitchell – mixing
- Adam Phillips – guitar
- Russ Powell - guitar
- Brian Rawling – producer
- Antoinette Roberson – background vocals
- Tom Salta – keyboards, programming
- Richie Sambora – producer
- Robin Smith – string arrangements
- Hamish Stewart – background vocals
- Jeff Taylor – additional production, laughs, production engineer, remixing
- Mark Taylor – composer, guitar, keyboards, mixing, producer, programming, string arrangements
- Todd Terry – producer
- Junior Vasquez – producer
- Audrey Wheeler – background vocals
- James "D-Train" Williams – background vocals

== Charts ==
=== Weekly charts ===
Weekly chart performance for Believe
Chart (1998–1999)	Peak position
Argentine Albums (CAPIF)	3
Australian Albums (ARIA)	13
Austrian Albums (Ö3 Austria)	1
Belgian Albums (Ultratop Flanders)	3
Belgian Albums (Ultratop Wallonia)	3
Canada Top Albums/CDs (RPM)	1
Canadian Albums (Billboard)	2
Czech Albums (ČNS IFPI)	3
Danish Albums (Hitlisten)	1
Dutch Albums (Album Top 100)	7
Estonian Albums (Eesti Top 10)	4
European Albums (Billboard)	1
Finnish Albums (Suomen virallinen lista)	4
French Albums (SNEP)	5
German Albums (Offizielle Top 100)	1
Greek Albums (IFPI)	1
Hungarian Albums (MAHASZ)	3
Icelandic Albums (Tónlist)	5
Italian Albums (FIMI)	6
Japanese Albums (Oricon)	47
Malaysian Albums (RIM)	7
New Zealand Albums (RMNZ)	1
Norwegian Albums (VG-lista)	4
Portuguese Albums (AFP)	1
Quebec Albums (ADISQ)	1
Scottish Albums (Official Charts)	6
Singaporean Albums (SPVA)	7
Spanish Albums (PROMUSICAE)	2
Swedish Albums (Sverigetopplistan)	2
Swiss Albums (Schweizer Hitparade)	2
UK Albums (Official Charts)	7
US Billboard 200	4
Chart (2002)	Peak position
US Billboard Catalog Albums	49
Chart (2023)	Peak position
Croatian International Albums (HDU)	35

=== Monthly charts ===
Monthly chart performance for Believe
Chart (1999)	Peak position
South Korean Albums (RIAK)	20

=== Year-end charts ===
1998 year-end chart performance for Believe
Chart (1998)	Position
Austrian Albums (Ö3 Austria)	32
German Albums (Offizielle Top 100)	79
Norwegian Albums (Christmas) (VG-lista)	18
Spanish Albums (PROMUSICAE)	28
Swedish Albums (Sverigetopplistan)	36
UK Albums (OCC)	32

1999 year-end chart performance for Believe
Chart (1999)	Position
Australian Albums (ARIA)	23
Austrian Albums (Ö3 Austria)	3
Belgian Albums (Ultratop Flanders)	10
Belgian Albums (Ultratop Wallonia)	11
Canadian Albums (RPM)	6
Danish Albums (Hitlisten)	2
Dutch Albums (MegaCharts)	20
European Albums (Music & Media)	1
French Albums (SNEP)	17
German Albums (Offizielle Top 100)	1
Italian Albums (Musica e dischi)	20
New Zealand Albums (RMNZ)	11
Norwegian Albums (Winter) (VG-lista)	2
Spanish Albums (PROMUSICAE)	14
Swedish Albums (Sverigetopplistan)	18
Swiss Albums (Schweizer Hitparade)	9
UK Albums (OCC)	48
US Billboard 200	17

2000 year-end chart performance for Believe
Chart (2000)	Position
Finnish Albums (Suomen virallinen lista)	86

== Certifications and sales ==
Certifications and sales for Believe
Region	Certification	Certified units/sales
Argentina (CAPIF)	Platinum	60,000^{^}
Australia (ARIA)	2× Platinum	140,000^{^}
Austria (IFPI Austria)	Platinum	50,000^{*}
Belgium (BRMA)	Platinum	50,000^{*}
Brazil (Pro-Música Brasil)	Gold	100,000^{*}
Canada (Music Canada)	6× Platinum	600,000^{^}
Chile	Gold	2,500
Colombia	Gold	30,000
Czech Republic	Gold	25,000
Denmark (IFPI Danmark)	8× Platinum	160,000^{‡}
Finland (Musiikkituottajat)	Gold	32,682
France (SNEP)	Platinum	300,000^{*}
Germany (BVMI)	2× Platinum	1,000,000^{^}
Greece (IFPI Greece)	Gold	15,000^{^}
Hong Kong (IFPI Hong Kong)	Gold	10,000^{*}
Hungary (MAHASZ)	Platinum	10,000^{^}
Indonesia	Platinum	50,000
Ireland (IRMA)	3× Platinum	45,000^{^}
Israel	Gold	15,000
Italy (FIMI)	3× Platinum	300,000^{*}
Japan (RIAJ)	Gold	100,000^{^}
Malaysia	Gold	5,000
Mexico (AMPROFON)	2× Gold	200,000^{^}
Netherlands (NVPI)	Platinum	100,000^{^}
New Zealand (RMNZ)	2× Platinum	30,000^{^}
Norway (IFPI Norway)	Platinum	50,000^{*}
Poland (ZPAV)	Platinum	100,000^{*}
Portugal (AFP)	2× Platinum	80,000^{^}
Singapore (RIAS)	Gold	7,500^{*}
South Africa (RISA)	2× Platinum	100,000^{*}
South Korea	—	16,527
Spain (Promusicae)	4× Platinum	400,000^{^}
Sweden (GLF)	3× Platinum	240,000^{^}
Switzerland (IFPI Switzerland)	2× Platinum	100,000^{^}
Taiwan (RIT)	Gold	25,000^{*}
Thailand	Gold	20,000
Turkey (Mü-Yap)	3× Platinum	30,000^{*}
United Kingdom (BPI)	2× Platinum	700,000
United States (RIAA)	4× Platinum	4,000,000^{^}
Summaries
Europe (IFPI)	4× Platinum	4,000,000^{*}
Worldwide	—	11,000,000
^{*} Sales figures based on certification alone.^{^} Shipments figures based on certification alone.^{‡} Sales+streaming figures based on certification alone.

== Release history ==
Release history and formats for Believe
Region	Date	Format(s)	Edition	Label
France	October 22, 1998	CD; cassette; LP	Standard	WEA
United Kingdom	October 26, 1998	CD; cassette; LP	Standard	WEA
Germany	November 2, 1998	CD; cassette; LP	Standard	WEA
Canada	November 3, 1998	CD; cassette; LP	Standard	WEA
United States	November 10, 1998	CD; cassette; LP; mini-album	Standard	Warner Bros.
Japan	December 23, 1998	CD; cassette	Standard; limited edition	WEA
United States	November 3, 2023	CD; LP; digital download; streaming	Deluxe edition	Warner

== See also ==
- List of best-selling albums by women
- List of number-one albums of 1999 (Europe)
- List of number-one albums of 1999 (Germany)
- List of number-one albums of the 1990s (New Zealand)
- List of Top 10 albums of 1998 (UK)
- List of Top 10 albums of 1999 (UK)
