= Più che puoi =

"Più Che Puoi"

Single by Eros Ramazzotti and Cher

from the album Stilelibero
- Released: July 3, 2001
- Recorded: 2000
- Genre: Pop rock
- Length: 4:13
- Label: BMG International
- Composers: Eros Ramazzotti; Antonio Galbiati
- Lyricists: Eros Ramazzotti; Adelio Cogliati; Cher

Eros Ramazzotti singles chronology
"Il Mio amore per Te" (2001)	"Più che puoi" (2001)	"Un Angelo non È" (2001)

Cher singles chronology
"Dov'è l'amore" (1999)	"Più che puoi" (2001)	"The Music's No Good Without You" (2001)

Music video
- "Più che puoi" on YouTube

"Più Che Puoi" ("As Much As You Can") is a duet by Italian singer Eros Ramazzotti and American singer-actress Cher, released on July 3, 2001 by BMG International. It was also the third single from Ramazzotti's eighth studio album, Stilelibero.

== Song information ==
In the song, Cher and Ramazzotti both sang in Italian and English.

A video was released in 2001, featuring Eros Ramazzotti barefoot and playing his guitar in an empty room and Cher singing in a recording studio.

Jose F. Promis, critic, called this duet dramatic.

== Charts ==
=== Weekly charts ===
2001 weekly chart performance for "Più che puoi"
Chart 2001	Peak position
Belgium (Ultratip Bubbling Under Flanders)	4
Belgium (Ultratop 50 Wallonia)	14
Croatia Airplay (HRT)	6
European Hot 100 Singles (Billboard)	70
Europe Border Breakers (Music & Media)	10
Finland (Radio Airplay Chart)	10
France (SNEP)	42
Germany (Official German Charts)	61
Hungary (Mahasz)	2
Italy (FIMI)	20
Italy (Musica e Dischi)	16
Italy Airplay (Music & Media)	7
Netherlands (Single Top 100)	43
Poland Airplay (Music & Media)	4
Poland (Nielsen Music Control)	1
Romania (Romanian Top 100)	23
Russia Airplay (InterMedia)	1
Spain Top 40 Radio	29
Switzerland (Schweizer Hitparade)	17

=== Year-end charts ===
Year-end chart performance for "Più Che Puoi"
Chart (2001)	Position
Belgium (Ultratop 50 Wallonia)	73
Romania (Romanian Top 100)	65
