= If I Could Turn Back Time: Cher's Greatest Hits =

Greatest hits album by Cher
- Released: March 9, 1999
- Recorded: 1965–1991
- Genres: Pop rock; soft rock
- Length: 61:40
- Label: Geffen

Cher chronology
Believe (1998)	If I Could Turn Back Time: Cher's Greatest Hits (1999)	The Greatest Hits (1999)

If I Could Turn Back Time: Cher's Greatest Hits is the fourth U.S. compilation album by American singer-actress Cher, released on March 9, 1999, by Geffen. In January 2000, the album was certified Gold by the RIAA for selling more than 500,000 copies in the US. Billboard stated in November 2011 that the album had sold 955,000 copies in the US.

== Album information ==
The album was released in United States and Canada in March 1999 by Cher's former record company, Geffen Records. It peaked at #57 on the US Billboard 200 album chart and #40 on the Canadian album chart. As it was made available as an import in some countries, the album peaked at #2 on the Danish albums chart in February 1999, being held from the top spot by Cher's current studio album Believe.

The album was originally released with a remix of "Don't Come Cryin' To Me," a track that was recorded during the Heart of Stone album sessions, but the track was later removed per Cher's personal request. In November of the same year, Cher's current record label Warner Brothers released the compilation The Greatest Hits outside North America, which does contain her last 1998 worldwide hit - "Believe".

== Critical reception ==
Professional ratings
Review scores
Source	Rating
AllMusic	4/5 stars
Entertainment Weekly	A
Buffalo News	2.5/5 stars

AllMusic noted that the compilation "concentrates on Cher's big hits of the late '80s and early '90s" and "does not do this badly", but added that it "hardly results in a balanced retrospective", concluding that it "can be enjoyable" as long as it is not considered "definitive". Entertainment Weekly gave the compilation an A for its "breadth", stating that it contains "pleasures so guilty, they deserved life imprisonment", while noting its appeal and historical intrigue despite its "brazenly artificial" qualities. The Buffalo News wrote that the last song on the record, "I Got You Babe", "provides just the right touch of nostalgia and pathos for a career that has seen Cher survive the pitfalls of life and stardom".

== Track listing ==
No.	Title	Writer(s)	Album	Length
1.	"Don't Come Cryin' to Me†"	Diane Warren	Previously unreleased (Originally recorded for Heart of Stone)	4:02
2.	"Love and Understanding"	Warren	Love Hurts	4:44
3.	"Save Up All Your Tears"	Warren, Desmond Child	Love Hurts	4:02
4.	"The Shoop Shoop Song (It's in His Kiss)"	Rudy Clark	Mermaids (soundtrack)	2:53
5.	"After All" (duet with Peter Cetera)	Tom Snow, Dean Pitchford	Heart of Stone	4:07
6.	"If I Could Turn Back Time"	Warren	Heart of Stone	4:03
7.	"Just Like Jesse James"	Warren, Child	Heart of Stone	4:07
8.	"Heart of Stone" (Remix)	Andy Hill, Peter Sinfield	Heart of Stone	4:20
9.	"I Found Someone"	Michael Bolton, Mark Mangold	Cher	3:46
10.	"We All Sleep Alone"	Jon Bon Jovi, Child, Richie Sambora	Cher	3:51
11.	"Bang Bang" (1987 version)	Sonny Bono	Cher	3:54
12.	"Take Me Home"	Bob Esty, Michele Aller	Take Me Home	3:26
13.	"Dark Lady"	Johnny Durrill	Dark Lady	3:29
14.	"Half-Breed"	Mary Dean, Al Capps	Half-Breed	2:46
15.	"The Way of Love"	Al Stillman, Jacques Dieval	Chér	2:34
16.	"Gypsys, Tramps & Thieves"	Bob Stone	Chér	2:38
17.	"I Got You Babe" (Sonny & Cher)	Bono	Look at Us	3:09
Total length:				61:40

† Only available on early editions

== Personnel ==
- Cher - main vocals
- Sonny Bono - main vocals
- Peter Cetera - main vocals
- Guy Roche - producer
- Michael Bolton - producer
- Bob Esty - producer
- Snuff Garrett - producer

Mike Khouri - liner notes

- Harry Langdon - photography
- Matthew Rolston - photography

== Charts ==
=== Weekly charts ===
1999 weekly chart performance for If I Could Turn Back Time: Cher's Greatest Hits
Chart (1999)	Peak position
Canada Top Albums/CDs (RPM)	40
Danish Albums (Hitlisten)	2
European Albums (Top 100)	91
US Billboard 200	57

2003 weekly chart performance for If I Could Turn Back Time: Cher's Greatest Hits
Chart (2003)	Peak position
US Billboard Catalog Albums	12

2023 weekly chart performance for If I Could Turn Back Time: Cher's Greatest Hits
Chart (2023)	Peak position
UK Album Downloads (OCC)	48

=== Year-end charts ===
Year-end chart performance for If I Could Turn Back Time: Cher's Greatest Hits
Chart (1999)	Peak position
Danish Albums (Hitlisten)	64

== Certifications and sales ==
Certifications and sales for If I Could Turn Back Time: Cher's Greatest Hits
Region	Certification	Certified units/sales
United States (RIAA)	Gold	955,000
