= Dov'è l'amore =

1999 single by Cher

- Cher as the Mona Lisa on the single cover

Single by Cher

from the album Believe
- B-side: "All or Nothing"
- Released: October 25, 1999
- Studio: Dreamhouse (London, England)
- Genre: Latin pop
- Length: 4:18 (album version); 3:46 (Emilio Estefan Jr. radio edit)
- Label: Warner Bros.; WEA
- Songwriters: Mark Taylor; Paul Barry
- Producers: Mark Taylor; Brian Rawling

Cher singles chronology
"All or Nothing" (1999)	"Dov'è l'amore" (1999)	"Più che puoi" (2001)

Audio sample
- file; help

Music video
- "Dov'è l'amore" on YouTube

"Dov'è l'amore" (Italian pronunciation: [doˈvɛ llaˈmoːre]; English: "Where's [the] Love") is a song recorded by American singer and actress Cher for her twenty-second studio album, Believe (1998). It was written by Mark Taylor and Paul Barry, and produced by Taylor and Brian Rawling, and released as the fourth single from the album on October 25, 1999 by Warner Bros. and WEA. The song is a Latin-influenced track with Spanish guitar over dance beats. In the song, Cher mixes English with Italian lyrics as she sings: "Dov'è l'amore / dov'è l'amore / I cannot tell you of my love / here is my story".

== Critical reception ==
Rolf E. Lund of the Norwegian newspaper Altaposten described "Dov'è l'amore" as a "sophisticated" song in his review. J.W. Lim from Associated Press said that it, along with "The Power" and "We All Sleep Alone" are the "bright spots" of the Believe album. The Daily Vault's Michael R. Smith wrote that "even Madonna was envious when she heard the Latin-infused track for the first time." Sarah Davis of Dotmusic described it as "catchy", noting that "skilful writing and slick production on vocal effects and vibrant beats give the song its own appeal."

Entertainment Weekly's Beth Johnson commented that Cher's "unmistakable voice makes the song shine". She described it as an "Italian salsa". Henrik Bæk of Gaffa noted that the song is the only track that deviates from the electronic dance music sound on the album. He described it as a "world music characterized" song that with the help of the Gipsy Kings "swings magnificently in Latin American rhythms." Deborah Wilker from Knight Ridder said that Cher "fetes" Madonna's "La Isla Bonita" "with the romantic 'Dov'è l'amore'". Bob Waliszewski of Plugged In wrote that Cher "expresses affection across the miles" on the song. "Dov'è l'amore" was also praised for the use of acoustic guitars.

== Music video ==
Cher in the music video for "Dov'è l'amore"

Initially, American singer Madonna wanted to direct the music video for "Dov'è l'amore", but she was not able due to her busy schedule. She was then replaced by Jamie O'Connor.

The video for "Dov'è l'amore" follows the story of a man who tries to win the affections of a Latina woman. During the course of the video many people are shown dancing to flamenco, others are shown playing guitars and some people are just enjoying watching the dancers. In the video Cher wore a big red flamenco dress and she sat in a red room while singing and petting a chihuahua dog. The concept of the song and video was considered an attempt to ride into the wave of the rising Latin influence in music at the time of its release, having both a Spanish genre, and Italian lyrics.

The track used for the original "Dov'è l'amore" video was the Emilio Estefan, Jr. Radio Edit mix instead of the album version which is slightly slower and lasts nearly 30 seconds longer.

In late 1999, Dan-O-Rama remixed the "Dov'è l'amore" video, but instead of using a remix of the song he left the "Dov'è l'amore" (Emilio Estefan Jr. Radio Edit) in it and only remixed some video clips. In the year 2000, this video was released as a promo on VHS tape in the UK. In 2004, it was officially released on DVD in the video compilation, The Very Best of Cher: The Video Hits Collection.

== Track listings ==
=== "Dov'è l'amore" ===
- UK CD1
1. "Dov'è l'amore" (radio edit) – 3:44
2. "Dov'è l'amore" (Ray Roc's Latin soul vocal mix) – 9:37
3. "Dov'è l'amore" (Tony Moran's Anthem 7-inch mix) – 3:30
- UK CD2 and Australian CD single
1. "Dov'è l'amore" – 4:18
2. "Dov'è l'amore" (Tony Moran's Anthem mix) – 9:54
3. "Dov'è l'amore" (Tee's radio) – 3:20
- UK cassette single
1. "Dov'è l'amore" (radio edit) – 3:44
2. "Dov'è l'amore" (Ray Roc's Latin soul vocal mix) – 9:37
- UK 12-inch single

A1. "Dov'è l'amore" (Emilio Estefan Jnr. extended mix) – 5:38
A2. "Dov'è l'amore" (Ray Roc's Latin soul vocal mix) – 9:37
B1. "Dov'è l'amore" (Tony Moran's Anthem mix) – 9:54
B2. "Dov'è l'amore" (Tee's radio) – 3:20

- 'European CD single
1. "Dov'è l'amore" – 4:18
2. "Dov'è l'amore" (radio edit) – 3:44

=== "All or Nothing" / "Dov'è l'amore" ===
- US maxi-CD single
1. "All or Nothing" (Danny Tenaglia international mix)
2. "All or Nothing" (Metro radio mix)
3. "All or Nothing" (Danny Tenaglia Cherbot Vocadub)
4. "All or Nothing" (Almighty Definitive mix)
5. "Dov'è l'amore" (Todd Terry's TNT club mix)
6. "Dov'è l'amore" (Tony Moran's Anthem mix)
7. "Dov'è l'amore" (Ray Roc's Latin soul vocal mix)
8. "Dov'è l'amore" (Tee's radio mix)
9. "Dov'è l'amore" (Tony Moran's Anthem 7-inch mix)
10. "Dov'è l'amore" (Ray Roc's radio mix)
- US 2×12-inch single

A1. "All or Nothing" (Danny Tenaglia international mix) – 9:46
A2. "All or Nothing" (Almighty Definitive mix) – 8:32
B1. "All or Nothing" (Danny Tenaglia Cherbot Vocadub) – 12:37
B2. "All or Nothing" (Metro radio mix) – 3:59
C1. "Dov'è l'amore" (Todd Terry's TNT club mix) – 6:56
C2. "Dov'è l'amore" (Tony Moran's Anthem mix) – 9:54
D1. "Dov'è l'amore" (Ray Roc's Latin soul vocal mix) – 9:37
D2. "Dov'è l'amore" (Todd Terry's MT's club mix) – 6:52

== Charts ==
=== Weekly charts ===
Chart (1999–2000)	Peak position
Australia (ARIA)	49
Austria (Ö3 Austria Top 40)	38
Belgium (Ultratop 50 Flanders)	36
Belgium (Ultratop 50 Wallonia)	14
Czech Republic (IFPI)	8
Estonia (Eesti Top 20)	4
Europe (European Hot 100 Singles)	30
Europe (European Radio Top 50)	15
Finland (Suomen virallinen lista)	5
France (SNEP)	46
Germany (GfK)	31
Greece (IFPI)	7
Hungary (Mahasz)	10
Hungary Airplay (Music & Media)	1
Italy (FIMI)	8
Italy (Musica e dischi)	11
Latvia (Latvijas Top 197)	14
Netherlands (Dutch Top 40 Tipparade)	4
Netherlands (Single Top 100)	53
Poland Airplay (Music & Media)	8
Quebec (ADISQ)	39
Scottish Singles Sales (Official Charts)	16
Spain (Promusicae)	4
Sweden (Sverigetopplistan)	37
Switzerland (Schweizer Hitparade)	18
UK Singles (Official Charts)	21
US Dance Club Songs (Billboard)	5
US Dance Singles Sales (Billboard) with "All or Nothing"	2

=== Year-end charts ===
Chart (1999)	Position
Italy (Musica e dischi)	53
Latvia (Latvijas Top 197)	132
Romania (Romanian Top 100)	16

Chart (2000)	Position
US Maxi-Singles Sales (Billboard)	25

== Release history ==
Region	Date	Format(s)	Label(s)	Ref.
United Kingdom	October 25, 1999	CD; cassette	WEA	
New Zealand	December 13, 1999	CD	WEA	
