= One by One (Cher song) =

1996 single by Cher

Single by Cher

from the album It's a Man's World
- B-side: "I Wouldn't Treat a Dog (The Way You Treated Me)"
- Released: January 6, 1996
- Studio: Elephant (London)
- Genre: Soul; R&B
- Length: 5:06 (Europe); 4:06 (US)
- Label: Reprise; WEA
- Songwriters: Anthony Griffiths; Cher
- Producers: Stephen Lipson; Sam Ward

Cher singles chronology
"Walking in Memphis" (1995)	"One by One" (1996)	"Not Enough Love in the World" (1996)

Audio
- "One by One" on YouTube

"One by One" is a song by American singer and actress Cher from her twenty-first studio album, It's a Man's World (1995), released as a single in 1996. It was co-written by Cher and Anthony Griffiths of the Real People, who had released their version prior as their debut single in 1987. Two versions of the song were recorded for It's a Man's World: the original, included on British pressings, is a soul song with elements of rock and was produced by Stephen Lipson. The American mix was produced by Sam Ward and has an R&B feel with slight alterations; additional remixes were created by DJ Junior Vasquez. In the United Kingdom, WEA released the song as the second single from the album on January 6, 1996; in the United States it was issued through Reprise Records as the lead single on May 21.

Upon release, the song received positive reviews from critics, who deemed it a highlight in It's a Man's World. In the UK, the song reached the chart's top 10. It was less successful in America, barely cracking the Billboard Hot 100's top 60. The Junior Vasquez remixes, however, reached the top 10 on the Maxi-Singles Sales and Dance Club Play charts. To promote the single, a music video was shot. Directed by Marcus Nispel, it depicts Cher singing the song from within a television set; she also delivered performances on a handful of occasions throughout 1996.

== Background ==
In the 1980s, Cher's career as an actress reached its peak: she starred in critically successful films such as Silkwood (1983), Mask (1985), The Witches of Eastwick (1987), and won the Academy Award for Best Actress for her performance in Moonstruck (1987). By the early 1990s, however, her movie career came to a halt: having turned down films such as The War of the Roses (1989) and Thelma & Louise (1991), and suffering from chronic fatigue syndrome complicated by pneumonia, she was reduced to "infomercial queen", something that deeply embarrassed her. "The infomercials were just devastating to my career", Cher recalled. On top of that, Faithful (1996), her first major movie since 1990's Mermaids, was a commercial failure. Cher came to the conclusion that something needed to be done if she wanted to revive her career. As part of her comeback, she starred and directed one of the segments of HBO's If These Walls Could Talk (1996), and began working on her twenty-first studio album, It's a Man's World.

The record was Cher's first studio album since 1991's Love Hurts; she saw it as a way of challenging herself, "it's [me] experimenting with me. I didn't want to sound like I've always sounded on records, because I'm kind of bored with it." She also chose to work with several producers, including Stephen Lipson, as opposed to just one. Most of the songs on It's a Man's World were covers of male-written tracks, as Cher wanted to sing them from a woman's perspective; these included Marc Cohn's "Walking in Memphis" (1991), Don Henley's "Not Enough Love in the World" (1985), and James Brown's "It's a Man's Man's Man's World" (1966). One of the songs on the album, "One by One", was co-written by Cher and the Real People member Anthony Griffiths, and recorded at London's Elephant Studios.

== Composition and remix ==
Comparisons between the British and American versions of "One by One"
"One by One"
Included on British pressings, the original version of "One by One" has rock influences...

"One by One" (US version)
...while the R&B mix created for American markets takes the singer's vocals and "stretches" them, giving the song a "more urban" sound.

Musically, "One by One" has been described as a mid-tempo soul song with rock influences. Cher sings in a "startlingly soulful" falsetto. In her own words, she tried to "make [my] voice sound different [...] I worked really hard to have more control and not use my vibrato". According to Reprise Records executive Craig Kostich, the lyrics talk about "accepting and loving each other and overcoming problems one by one", and display Cher's "serious, politically conscious" side. The song begins with the sound of "ghostly" guitars, as background vocals repeat the phrase dear daddy, dear daddy, which is blended with Cher's "soft" vocals. In the refrain, she sings We're gonna love one another till morning comes/Seek the sweet salvation for what we've done/Give up resisting one by one, as "chugging" rock guitars play in the background. Towards the middle, a saxophone solo plays. According to the sheet music published by Alfred Publishing Inc., "One by One" is composed in the key of C minor, with Cher's voice spanning from B♭_{3} to E♭_{5}.

A version of "One by One" was created for American markets. Produced by Sam Ward, it was requested by Reprise Records, as they felt it would "bode well with the R&B phenomenon" that was "sweeping" the United States in the mid 1990s. This version features "crisp jeep rhythms and cushiony synths" beneath the refrain, while Cher's falsetto vocals are "stretched" to give the song a more R&B feel. It also omits the background vocals and saxophone solo. An additional edited version, featuring verses by rapper Melle Mel, was created for American radios. A remix of the single was commissioned by American DJ Junior Vasquez; created with the intention of "[taking] Cher to the dance floor", Vasquez' remix has been noted as bringing the song "into the tribal house realm". It features a "barrage" of sound effects not present in the original, such as percussions and cowbells.

== Release and promotion ==
In the United Kingdom, WEA issued "One by One" as the second single from It's a Man's World on January 6, 1996. Released in CD, cassette, and twelve-inch formats, the single included the Junior Vasquez remix, Cher's version of "It's a Man's Man's Man's World", and her own "If I Could Turn Back Time" (1989). In the United States, it was released on May 21, 1996, as the album's lead single through Reprise Records. Prior to its release, Billboard reported that the Junior Vazquez remix was receiving "major play" at nightclubs, and had been picked by WKTU radio station. "One by One" was included on three Cher compilation albums: The Greatest Hits (1999), The Very Best of Cher (2003), and Gold (2005). A rare remix, known as the JR's pride mix, was released in June 2023 to accompany the deluxe reissue of It's a Man's World.

The music video for "One by One" was directed by German director Marcus Nispel. Shot in sepia, the visual shows a couple's relationship issues, whilst Cher is seen singing the song on the television. Billboard had previously reported that the singer's son Chaz Bono would star in the video. In the US, an altered version of the clip was released, featuring more shots of Cher. "One by One" can be found on 2004's The Very Best of Cher: The Video Hits Collection. On January 9, 1996, Cher sang "One by One" on The National Lottery Live; one month later, she presented it on Sanremo's Teatro Ariston. Finally, on June 27, "One by One" was performed on Late Night with David Letterman. In 2005, the Junior Vasquez Club Vocal Mix of "One by One" was included on the final Los Angeles concert of Cher's Living Proof: The Farewell Tour.

== Reception ==
=== Critical ===
Critical reception towards "One by One" was positive. AllMusic's Jose F. Promis deemed it "irresistible", and although he praised the American remixes, he concluded that the original version is "decidedly superior". Dotmusic columnist James Masterton called it, "quite possibly one of the most pure pop tracks [Cher] has ever recorded". Writing for Billboard magazine, Larry Flick opined the song is a "summery jeep pop ditty", as well as a "terrific single". He added: "By the time the chorus breaks in, you're hooked by the brain-embed-melody and lyric[s] that [are] as sweet as can be." Also from Billboard, Michael Paloetta said the track is one of It's a Man's World's "treasures", while Paul Verna referred to it as a "charming" first single. PopMatters' Peter Piatkowski highlighted the "insanely catchy chorus", further comparing the original version of song to the work of Tina Turner; he also praised the "slinky" American R&B mix. The staff of music website Pop Rescue described "One by One" as "almost dreamlike [...] truly a lovely song".

=== Commercial ===
"One by One" debuted on the US Billboard Hot 100 at number 81 the week of June 15, 1996, ultimately peaking at number 52 almost one month later, on July 13; the song was present on the chart for 14 weeks in total. It found more success on the US Maxi-Singles Sales and Dance Club Play charts, peaking at numbers six and seven, respectively. On the Adult Contemporary chart, "One by One" came in at number nine. By the end of 1996, it ranked 39th on the Maxi-Singles Sales chart. In Canada, the single debuted at the 97th position of RPM's 100 Hit Tracks chart on the week of June 19, 1996; a month later, it peaked at number 22. More successful was on RPM's Adult Contemporary chart, where the song reached the second position.

In the UK, "One by One" debuted and peaked at the seventh position of the UK Singles Chart on January 20, 1996, and was named the second-highest debut of the week. It became the singer's first single to debut within the top 10 of the chart, as well as her first top 10 hit since "Love and Understanding" five years prior. "One by One" spent a total of 9 weeks on the chart. "One by One" was the 83rd best-selling single from 1996 in the UK. In Hungary, the single reached the sixth position; on the European Hot 100 Singles chart, it came in at number 34.

== Track listings and formats ==
- UK and Australian CD single
1. "One by One" – 5:03
2. "If I Could Turn Back Time" – 3:59
3. "It's a Man's Man's Man's World" – 4:37
- UK 12-inch single
1. "One by One" (Junior's club vocal) – 8:45
2. "Walking in Memphis" (Shut Up and Dance vocal mix) – 5:08
3. "Walking in Memphis" (Baby Doc mix) – 7:34
- UK cassette single
1. "One by One" – 5:03
2. "It's a Man's Man's Man's World" – 4:37
- European maxi-CD single
1. "One by One" – 5:03
2. "One by One" (Junior Vasquez mix) – 8:45
3. "If I Could Turn Back Time" – 3:59
4. "It's a Man's Man's Man's World" – 4:37
- US 7-inch single
1. "One by One" (US version) – 4:06
2. "I Wouldn't Treat a Dog (The Way You Treated Me)" – 3:34
- US CD and cassette single
1. "One by One" (US version) – 4:06
2. "I Wouldn't Treat a Dog (The Way You Treated Me)" – 3:34
3. "One by One" – 5:03
- US and Australian maxi-CD single
1. "One by One" (with Melle Mel) – 4:06
2. "I Wouldn't Treat a Dog (The Way You Treated Me)" – 3:35
3. "One by One" (Junior Vasquez club vocal mix) – 8:45
4. "One by One" (Junior Vasquez club dub) – 7:22
5. "One by One" (X Beat mix) – 7:36
6. "One by One" (X Beat dub) – 7:36
- US 12-inch single
1. "One by One" (Junior Vasquez club vocal mix) – 8:45
2. "One by One" (Junior Vasquez club dub) – 7:22
3. "One by One" (with Melle Mel) – 4:06
4. "One by One" (X Beat mix) – 7:36
5. "I Wouldn't Treat a Dog (The Way You Treated Me)" – 3:35

== Credits and personnel ==
Credits are adapted from the liner notes of the British and American editions of It's a Man's World.

- Cher – vocals, composer (Note: Cher is credited as composer only in the US editions of It's a Man's World)
- Anthony Griffiths – composer
- Stephen Lipson – producer
- Sam Ward – producer (Note: US editions only)
- Heff Moraes – mixing engineer
- P. Dennis Mitchell – mixing engineer
- Gomi – programming
- Junior Vasquez – post production, remixing

== Charts ==
=== Weekly charts ===
Weekly chart performance for "One by One"
Chart (1996)	Peak position
Canada Top Singles (RPM)	22
Canada Adult Contemporary (RPM)	2
Croatia (HR Top 40)	27
Estonia (Eesti Top 20)	2
Europe (Eurochart Hot 100)	34
Europe (European AC Radio)	16
Europe (European Hit Radio)	8
Hungary (Mahasz)	6
Iceland (Íslenski Listinn Topp 40)	29
Italy Airplay (Music & Media)	10
Scottish Singles Sales (Official Charts)	5
UK Singles (Official Charts)	7
UK Airplay (Music Week)	2
UK Club Chart (Music Week)	24
US Billboard Hot 100	52
US Adult Contemporary (Billboard)	9
US Adult Pop Airplay (Billboard)	29
US Dance Club Songs (Billboard)	7
US Dance Singles Sales (Billboard)	6
US Cash Box Top 100	57

=== Year-end charts ===
1996 year-end chart performance for "One by One"
Chart (1996)	Position
Canada Adult Contemporary (RPM)	27
UK Singles (OCC)	83
UK Airplay (Music Week)	24
US Maxi-Singles Sales (Billboard)	39
