= Strong Enough (Cher song) =

1999 single by Cher

Single by Cher

from the album Believe
- Released: February 22, 1999
- Studio: Dreamhouse (London, England)
- Genre: Disco
- Length: 3:44 (album version); 3:33 (radio edit)
- Label: Warner Bros.; WEA
- Songwriters: Mark Taylor; Paul Barry
- Producer: Mark Taylor

Cher singles chronology
"Believe" (1998)	"Strong Enough" (1999)	"All or Nothing" (1999)

Music video
- "Strong Enough" on YouTube

"Strong Enough" is a song by American recording artist Cher from her 22nd studio album, Believe (1998). The song was released as the second single from the album on February 22, 1999, by Warner Music. The song's composition and musical style is strongly reminiscent of 1970s disco music. The song received positive reviews from music critics, many calling it a highlight to Believe and comparing it to Gloria Gaynor's "I Will Survive". "Strong Enough" peaked at number 57 on the US Billboard Hot 100 and topped the Billboard Dance Club Play chart. Worldwide, it reached number one in Hungary and entered the top 10 in 14 other countries.

== Background and reception ==
"Strong Enough" was released as the second international single from Cher's twenty-second studio album, Believe, which was released in 1998. However it was not successful in the US until it received more airplay following the release of promotional remixes. The song, along with "Believe", has become one of her most successful songs to date.

"Strong Enough" received favorable reviews from music critics. Swedish newspaper Aftonbladet stated that the song "will be as great for the distressed" as Gloria Gaynor's "I Will Survive". Michael Gallucci from AllMusic wrote that "Cher herself merely moves through the beat factory with one drab vocal range, blending butt-shaker." Randy Cordova from The Arizona Republic described the song as a "thumping retro-disco tune". Larry Flick from Billboard wrote that it "picks up right where "Believe" left off." He noted that the "retro-disco" song is "irresistibly catchy, jubilant as a prayer revival, and an ideal partner as kids prepare to buddy up with radio as school finishes up. Everything about this anthemic track is obvious from the first listen: Cher is again in peak form, set in front of a string-laden, thump-happy beat that will have folks tapping toes and snapping fingers from Maine to Minnesota." He also added that "no doubt, this is the biggest no-brainer hit we've heard this year." Matt Stopera and Brian Galindo from BuzzFeed commented, "Always overshadowed by "Believe", "Strong Enough" was also a great '90s dance song!" The Daily Vault's Michael R. Smith said that "this is the most comfortable and relaxed she has ever sounded musically." A reviewer from Irish Independent picked it as one of the "highlights" from the Believe album, noting it as "rousing". Deborah Wilker from Knight Ridder said "Strong Enough" is the best song of the album, calling it a "catchy feminist chant" and "her very own "I Will Survive"".

== Chart performance ==
"Strong Enough" peaked at number 57 on the US Billboard Hot 100, staying on the charts for twelve weeks. The song did not receive much attention in the United States, but when the promo remixes were released, the song had peaked at number one on the Billboard Hot Dance Club Play. It also peaked at number 31 on the Billboard Pop Songs, number 29 on the Billboard Hot Adult Contemporary Tracks and number 40 on the Billboard Hot Adult Top 40 Tracks.

Elsewhere, "Strong Enough" was more successful, mostly getting in the top 10 in most countries. It peaked at number six in New Zealand, whilst reaching number eleven in Australia. The song fared even better in Europe, peaking at number one in Hungary, whilst reaching number two in Poland, number three in France, Germany, and Iceland, number four in Austria, Belgium, and Spain, and number five in Denmark and Switzerland. In the UK, it debuted at number five on the UK Singles Chart, until descending the rest of the way, finally finishing at number 56, charting for 10 weeks in the top 100. In neighboring Ireland, it peaked at number 11 whilst reaching number four in Scotland. As a result of its overall European success, it peaked at number three on the European Hot 100 chart and ranked at number 24 on the year-end tally.

== Music video ==
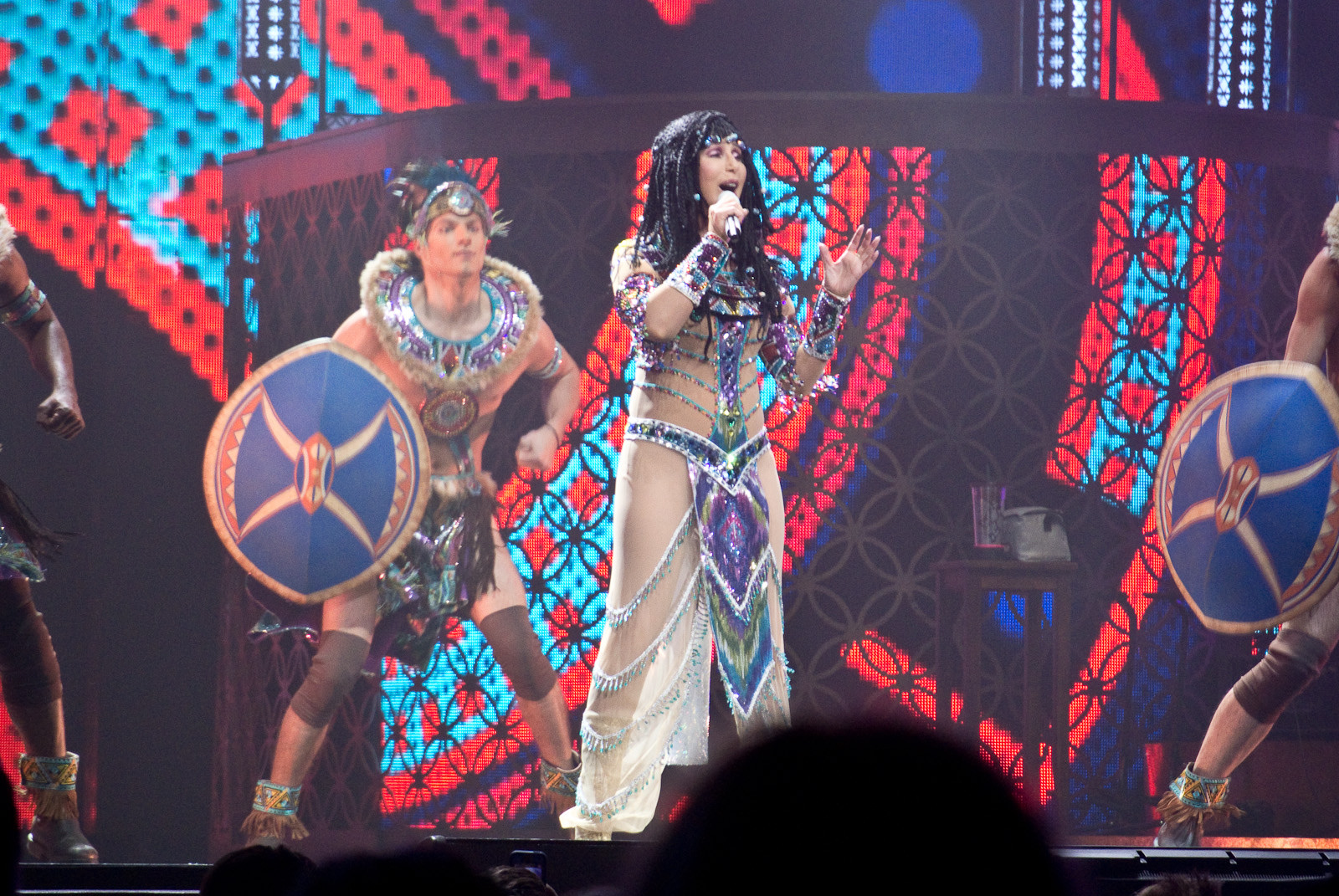
Cher performing "Strong Enough" at her 2014 Dressed to Kill Tour during a gladiator-themed segment of the show

The accompanying music video for "Strong Enough" was directed by British director Nigel Dick and was released worldwide in early 1999. A promo VHS tape and CD-R were also released in the US, but are very rare. The video promo also includes the remixed version of the video.

In this video, Cher is a computer virus and her role is an advisor who tells a bad boyfriend the reasons why his girlfriend (played by Shannyn Sossamon) will leave him. Teens in a party, two women, two robbers and many gothic instrument players also appear in the video.

A couple of months after the release of the original music video for Strong Enough, Dan-O-Rama (best known for his work remixing videos) created the "vocal club edit" video for this song. He used the "Strong Enough" Pumpin' Dolls Vocal Epic club remix and Club 69 Future edit promo only for DJs in 2000. The original music video is also featured on 'The Very Best Of Cher: The Video Hits Collection'.

== Legacy ==
In 2020, the Chicago Tribune listed "Strong Enough" as one of the "25 Pride anthems of all time", and stated that "one could easily interpret the lyrics to be about a repressive society that she is no longer willing to tolerate."

== Track listings ==
US and Canadian maxi-CD single

1. "Strong Enough" (album version) – 3:44
2. "Strong Enough" (Club 69 Future Anthem mix) – 11:00
3. "Strong Enough" (Pumpin' Dolls Vocal Epic club) – 7:22
4. "Strong Enough" (male version) – 3:32
5. "Strong Enough" (Club 69 Phunk mix) – 8:32
6. "Strong Enough" (Mark Andrews remix edit) – 7:31
7. "Strong Enough" (Pumpin' Dolls Cashmere club mix) – 8:34
8. "Strong Enough" (D-Bop's Melt mix) – 7:49
9. "Strong Enough" (Club 69 Future Anthem short mix edit) – 8:39
10. "Strong Enough" (Pumpin' Dolls radio edit) – 3:48

US 2×12-inch single

A1. "Strong Enough" (Club 69 Future Anthem mix) – 11:00
A2. "Strong Enough" (album version) – 3:44
B1. "Strong Enough" (Club 69 Phunk mix) – 8:32
B2. "Strong Enough" (Mark Andrews remix edit) – 7:31
C1. "Strong Enough" (Pumpin' Dolls Vocal Epic club) – 7:22
C2. "Strong Enough" (D-Bop's Melt mix) – 7:49
C3. "Strong Enough" (male version) – 3:32
D1. "Strong Enough" (Pumpin' Dolls Cashmere club mix) – 8:34
D2. "Strong Enough" (Club 69 Future Anthem short mix edit) – 8:39

UK CD1

1. "Strong Enough" – 3:44
2. "Strong Enough" (Club 69 Future Anthem short mix edit) – 8:39
3. "Strong Enough" (Mark Andrews remix edit) – 7:31

UK CD2

1. "Strong Enough" – 3:44
2. "Strong Enough" (male version) – 3:32
3. "Strong Enough" (D-Bop's Melt mix) – 7:49

UK 12-inch single

A1. "Strong Enough" (Club 69 Future Anthem short mix) – 8:56
A2. "Strong Enough" (Mark Andrews remix) – 7:55
B1. "Strong Enough" (Club 69 Future Anthem instrumental) – 11:00

UK cassette single

1. "Strong Enough" – 3:44
2. "Strong Enough" (Club 69 Future Anthem short mix) – 8:56

European CD single

1. "Strong Enough" – 3:44
2. "Strong Enough" (Pumpin' Dolls radio edit) – 3:48

Australian CD single

1. "Strong Enough" – 3:44
2. "Believe" (Club 69 Phunk club mix) – 6:50
3. "Strong Enough" (Club 69 Future Anthem short mix) – 8:40
4. "Strong Enough" (Mark Andrews remix edit) – 7:31
5. "Strong Enough" (D-Bop Melt mix) – 7:49

Japanese remix EP (with "Believe")

1. "Strong Enough" (album version) – 3:44
2. "Strong Enough" (Pumpin' Dolls radio edit) – 3:48
3. "Strong Enough" (Club 69 Future Anthem mix) – 11:00
4. "Strong Enough" (Mark Andrews remix) – 7:55
5. "Believe" (album version) – 3:58
6. "Believe" (Phat 'N' Phunky club mix) – 7:44
7. "Believe" (Almighty Definitive mix) – 7:35
8. "Believe" (Club 69 Phunk club mix) – 8:55

== Charts ==
=== Weekly charts ===
1999 weekly chart performance for "Strong Enough"
Chart (1999)	Peak position
Australia (ARIA)	11
Austria (Ö3 Austria Top 40)	4
Belgium (Ultratop 50 Flanders)	6
Belgium (Ultratop 50 Wallonia)	4
Canada (Nielsen SoundScan)	16
Canada Top Singles (RPM)	30
Canada Adult Contemporary (RPM)	13
Canada Dance/Urban (RPM)	12
Denmark (Tracklisten)	5
Estonia (Eesti Top 20)	8
Europe (European Hot 100 Singles)	3
Finland (Suomen virallinen lista)	7
France (SNEP)	3
Germany (GfK)	3
Greece (IFPI)	6
Hungary (Mahasz)	1
Iceland (Íslenski Listinn Topp 40)	3
Ireland (IRMA)	11
Italy (FIMI)	10
Italy Airplay (Music & Media)	5
Latvia (Latvijas Top 197)	10
Mexico (Notitas Musicales)	7
Netherlands (Dutch Top 40)	11
Netherlands (Single Top 100)	11
New Zealand (Recorded Music NZ)	6
Norway (VG-lista)	16
Poland Airplay (Music & Media)	2
Quebec (ADISQ)	9
Scottish Singles Sales (Official Charts)	4
Spain (AFYVE)	4
Sweden (Sverigetopplistan)	21
Switzerland (Schweizer Hitparade)	5
UK Singles (Official Charts)	5
US Billboard Hot 100	57
US Adult Contemporary (Billboard)	29
US Adult Pop Airplay (Billboard)	40
US Dance Club Songs (Billboard)	1
US Dance Singles Sales (Billboard)	3
US Pop Airplay (Billboard)	31
US Top 40 Tracks (Billboard)	34

2024 weekly chart performance for "Strong Enough"
Chart (2024)	Peak position
Kazakhstan Airplay (TopHit)	28

=== Monthly charts ===
2024 monthly chart performance for "Strong Enough"
Chart (2024)	Peak position
Kazakhstan Airplay (TopHit)	32

=== Year-end charts ===
1999 year-end chart performance for "Strong Enough"
Chart (1999)	Position
Australia (ARIA)	65
Austria (Ö3 Austria Top 40)	40
Belgium (Ultratop 50 Flanders)	42
Belgium (Ultratop 50 Wallonia)	12
Canada Adult Contemporary (RPM)	81
Europe (European Hot 100 Singles)	24
Europe (European Radio 100 Singles)	13
France (SNEP)	22
Germany (Media Control)	39
Italy (Musica e dischi)	68
Latvia (Latvijas Top 197)	66
Netherlands (Dutch Top 40)	56
Netherlands (Single Top 100)	57
Romania Airplay (Romanian Top 100)	28
Switzerland (Schweizer Hitparade)	39
UK Singles (OCC)	72
US Dance Club Play (Billboard)	26
US Maxi-Singles Sales (Billboard)	14

2024 year-end chart performance for "Strong Enough"
Chart (2024)	Position
Kazakhstan Airplay (TopHit)	30

2025 year-end chart performance for "Strong Enough"
Chart (2025)	Position
Kazakhstan Airplay (TopHit)	186

== Certifications and sales ==
Region	Certification	Certified units/sales
Australia (ARIA)	Gold	35,000^{^}
Belgium (BRMA)	Platinum	50,000^{*}
France (SNEP)	Gold	250,000^{*}
Germany (BVMI)	Gold	250,000^{^}
United Kingdom (BPI)	Platinum	600,000^{‡}
^{*} Sales figures based on certification alone.^{^} Shipments figures based on certification alone.^{‡} Sales+streaming figures based on certification alone.

== Release history ==
Region	Date	Format(s)	Label(s)	Ref.
United Kingdom	February 22, 1999	CD; cassette	WEA	
United Kingdom	March 8, 1999	12-inch vinyl	WEA	
Japan	April 21, 1999	CD	WEA	
United States	May 11, 1999	Rhythmic contemporary; contemporary hit radio	Warner Bros.	
Canada	May 25, 1999	CD	WEA	

== Notable cover versions ==
- British pop group Steps covered the song live and added to their concert setlist, which is performed along with "Stomp".
