= It's a Man's World (Cher album) =

Studio album by Cher
- Released: November 6, 1995
- Recorded: 1995
- Studios: Elephant Studios (London, England)
- Genres: Soul; pop
- Length: 63:31 (Europe); 49:23 (North America)
- Labels: WEA (Europe); Reprise (North America)
- Producers: Craig Kostich (exec.); Trevor Horn; Stephen Lipson; Christopher Neil; Greg Penny

Cher chronology
Greatest Hits: 1965–1992 (1992)	It's a Man's World (1995)	Believe (1998)

Singles from It's a Man's World
- 1. "Walking in Memphis" Released: October 13, 1995; 2. "One by One" Released: January 8, 1996; 3. "Not Enough Love in the World" Released: April 12, 1996; 4. "The Sun Ain't Gonna Shine Anymore" Released: August 5, 1996; 5. "Paradise Is Here" Released: December 3, 1996

It's a Man's World is the twenty-first studio album by American singer and actress Cher released on November 6, 1995, by WEA, and distributed in North America by Reprise Records in 1996 with an adjusted track list. As of 1997, the album had sold 700,000 copies worldwide. In the UK the album peaked at number 10 and was certified Gold by the British Phonographic Industry (BPI) for selling more than 100,000 copies.

== Background ==
It's a Man's World found Cher singing "unconventional" songs in a style more associated with the Deep South, rather than her more familiar pop and rock roots. The album also stands out for Cher stretching her vocals to head register for such songs as "One by One" and "The Gunman", getting out of her comfort zone of her trademark husky contralto.

Cher signed with Warner Music UK in 1994 and recorded It's a Man's World in London in 1995. That same year the album was released in Europe with "Walking in Memphis" as its lead off single. It was certified gold in the UK by the British Phonographic Industry.

The original album release included fourteen songs. The United States release from 1996 includes eleven songs, removing "I Wouldn't Treat a Dog (The Way You Treated Me)", "Don't Come Around Tonite" and "Shape of Things to Come". Five songs were also remixed for the United States release: "Not Enough Love in the World", "Paradise Is Here", "Angels Running", "What About the Moonlight" and "One by One". Their new sound carried R&B influences, while their original versions were influenced by Southern rock and blues. Both the original album and the United States edition were released in Australia.

"The Gunman" was written by Prefab Sprout lead vocalist Paddy McAloon, who eventually released his recording of the song on the 2001 album The Gunman and Other Stories.

On July 14, 2023, Cher released a deluxe version of the album on both vinyl and CD.

== Singles ==
Five singles were released to promote the album. A cover of Marc Cohn's "Walking in Memphis" served as the lead single off the album in Europe, Australia and Canada. In Europe, the single was a notable hit and charted higher than the original version. It peaked at #11 in the UK and reached the top 20 in several European countries; however it failed to gain notable attention elsewhere. A music video for the song portrayed Cher walking around Memphis dressed as Elvis Presley and singing in a bus.

"One by One", co-written by Cher, saw more success. It was released as the second single in the UK and as the first single in the United States. The song peaked inside the top 10 in the UK and across Europe, as well as charting at #52 on the US Billboard Hot 100 and #22 in Canada. Three music videos were released to promote the song worldwide, all following a story of an unhappy couple trying to get over their struggles and showing scenes of Cher singing.

Two covers, Don Henley's "Not Enough Love in the World" and Frankie Valli's "The Sun Ain't Gonna Shine Anymore", were released as next singles off the album, both charted moderately in the UK. The final single in the US was a cover of Tina Turner's "Paradise Is Here" which was remixed and reached #11 on the US Dance Club Songs chart.

== Critical reception ==
Professional ratings
Review scores
Source	Rating
AllMusic	3/5 stars
Entertainment Weekly	C
The Guardian	2/5 stars
Los Angeles Times	2/4 stars
Music Week	3/5 stars
The Rolling Stone Album Guide	2.5/5 stars

Upon release, the album received a mixed response from international music critics. AllMusic's Jose F. Promis praised the album for its "torchy ballads, Western-themed epics, and R&B influences" and described it as "one of the singer's finest, as well as one of her most overlooked and underappreciated [works to date]". Jim Farber from Entertainment Weekly gave the album a C and while he appreciated "Walking In Memphis", stating that the song "must be heard to be believed" he wrote that the songs of the album "lack some of Cher's old camp". Paul Verna from Billboard said the album helped her open a new chapter on a "softer, often sullen rhythm pop note", as it reveals "vibrant and previously unheard colors of her voice". The Rolling Stone Album Guide rated It's a Man's World two and a half out of five stars.

== Commercial performance ==
It's a Man's World was successful in Europe. It debuted at number 28 on the UK Albums Chart on the week of 12 November 1995. The album rose to its peak position of number 10 during its thirteenth week on the chart following the commercial success of "One by One". The album spent a total of 22 weeks on the chart, sold over 100,000 copies in the UK and was certified gold by the British Phonographic Industry. It proved to be successful in other European countries peaking inside the top 20 in several of them and number eight in Austria. The album failed to gain notable attention elsewhere peaking number 64 on the US Billboard 200 with only 9,000 copies sold in its first week, and number 46 in Canada. As of 1997, the album sold 700,000 copies, according to Billboard.

== Track listing ==
Standard edition
No.	Title	Writer(s)	Producer(s)	Length
1.	"Walking in Memphis"	Marc Cohn	Christopher Neil	4:00
2.	"Not Enough Love in the World"	Don Henley; Danny Kortchmar; Benmont Tench	Stephen Lipson	4:25
3.	"One by One"	Anthony Griffiths; Cher^{[b]}	Lipson	5:06
4.	"I Wouldn't Treat a Dog (The Way You Treated Me)"	Daniel Walsh; Steve Barri; Michael Price; Michael Omartian	Greg Penny; Neil^{[a]}; Simon Hurrell^{[a]}	3:38
5.	"Angels Running"	Patty Larkin	Neil	4:42
6.	"Paradise Is Here"	Paul Brady	Lipson	5:06
7.	"I'm Blowin' Away"	Eric Kaz	Lipson	4:05
8.	"Don't Come Around Tonite"	Maia Sharp; Mark Addison	Neil	4:38
9.	"What About the Moonlight"	Kathleen York; Michael Dorian	Neil	4:20
10.	"The Same Mistake"	Marc Jordan; John Capek	Penny; Neil^{[a]}; Hurrell^{[a]}	4:30
11.	"The Gunman"	Paddy McAloon; Cher^{[b]}	Trevor Horn	5:14
12.	"The Sun Ain't Gonna Shine Anymore"	Bob Gaudio; Bob Crewe	Horn	5:16
13.	"Shape of Things to Come"	Horn; Lol Creme	Horn	4:08
14.	"It's a Man's Man's Man's World"	James Brown; Betty Jean Newsome	Lipson	4:40

North American edition
No.	Title	Writer(s)	Producer(s)	Length
1.	"One by One"	Griffiths; Cher^{[b]}	Lipson; Sam Ward^{[a]}	4:12
2.	"Not Enough Love in the World"	Henley; Kortchmar; Tench	Lipson; Ward^{[a]}	4:25
3.	"Angels Running"	Larkin	Neil; Daniel Abraham^{[c]}	4:35
4.	"What About the Moonlight"	York; Dorian	Neil; Ward^{[a]}	4:18
5.	"Paradise Is Here"	Brady	Lipson; Ward^{[a]}	4:40
6.	"The Same Mistake"	Jordan	Penny; Neil^{[a]}; Hurrell^{[a]}	4:25
7.	"I'm Blowin' Away"	Kaz	Lipson	4:05
8.	"Walking in Memphis"	Cohn	Neil	4:00
9.	"The Sun Ain't Gonna Shine Anymore"	Gaudio; Crewe	Horn	5:13
10.	"The Gunman"	McAloon; Cher^{[b]}	Horn	5:08
11.	"It's a Man's Man's Man's World"	Brown; Newsome	Lipson	4:40

2023 deluxe edition bonus disc
No.	Title	Writer(s)	Producer(s)	Length
1.	"One by One" (Junior Vasquez club vocal mix)	Griffiths; Cher^{[b]}	Lipson; Junior Vasquez^{[a]}	8:46
2.	"One by One" (JR's pride mix)	Griffiths; Cher^{[b]}	Lipson; Vasquez^{[a]}	9:07
3.	"One by One" (piano dub)	Griffiths; Cher^{[b]}	Lipson; Vasquez^{[a]}	5:27
4.	"One by One" (with Melle Mel)	Griffiths; Cher^{[b]}	Lipson; Ward^{[a]}	4:05
5.	"The Sun Ain't Gonna Shine Anymore" (Trevor Horn remix)	Gaudio; Crewe	Horn	4:02
6.	"Walking in Memphis" (Shut Up and Dance vocal mix)	Cohn	Neil; Shut Up and Dance^{[a]}	5:07
7.	"Walking in Memphis" (Baby Doc mix)	Cohn	Neil; Baby Doc^{[a]}	7:13
8.	"Paradise Is Here" (garage revival mix)	Brady	Lipson; Ward^{[a]}; David Ruberto^{[a]}	7:32
9.	"Paradise Is Here" (sunrise mix)	Brady	Lipson; Ward^{[a]}; David Ruberto^{[a]}	6:49
10.	"Paradise Is Here" (runway mix)	Brady	Lipson; Ward^{[a]}; David Ruberto^{[a]}	8:31
11.	"Paradise Is Here" (glow stick mix)	Brady	Lipson; Vasquez^{[a]}	8:34

Notes

- ^a signifies a remixer
- ^b Cher is credited as composer only in the US edition
- ^c signifies an additional producer

== Personnel ==
- Cher – main vocals
- Anne Dudley – string arrangements

Original versions

- Tracks 1, 5, 8, 9 produced by Christopher Neil
- Tracks 2, 3, 6, 7, 14 produced by Stephen Lipson
- Tracks 4, 10 produced by Greg Penny
- Tracks 11, 12, 13 produced by Trevor Horn

American remixes

- Tracks 1, 2, 4, 5 remixed by Sam Ward
- Track 3 remixed by Daniel Abraham
- "The Gunman" edited by the original song producer, Trevor Horn

Design

- David Scheinmann – photography

Production

- Craig Kostich – executive producer
- Steve Fitzmaurice – mixing

== Charts ==
=== Weekly charts ===
1995–96 weekly chart performance for It's a Man's World
Chart (1995–96)	Peak position
Austrian Albums (Ö3 Austria)	8
Canadian Albums (RPM)	46
Dutch Albums (Album Top 100)	91
European Albums (Top 100)	35
German Albums (Offizielle Top 100)	74
Italian Albums (FIMI)	15
Italian Albums (Musica e dischi)	16
Scottish Albums (Official Charts)	18
Swedish Albums (Sverigetopplistan)	18
UK Albums (Official Charts)	10
US Billboard 200	64
US Cash Box Top 100 Pop Albums	63

2023 weekly chart performance for It's a Man's World
Chart (2023)	Peak position
Hungarian Physical Albums (MAHASZ)	22
Spanish Vinyl Albums (Promusicae)	51
Swiss Albums (Schweizer Hitparade Romandy)	33
UK Record Store Chart (OCC)	34

=== Year-end charts ===
Year-end chart performance for It's a Man's World
Chart (1996)	Position
UK Albums (OCC)	84

== Certifications and sales ==
Certifications and sales for It's a Man's World
Region	Certification	Certified units/sales
United Kingdom (BPI)	Gold	100,000^{^}
United States	—	194,000
Summaries
Worldwide	—	700,000
^{^} Shipments figures based on certification alone.
