= Stilelibero =

Studio album by Eros Ramazzotti
- Released: 30 October 2000
- Recorded: London, England: Olympic Studios, Sarm West Studios, Studio 52, Angel Recording Studios, Roundhouse Studio, Soho Studio; Los Angeles, California: Westlake Recording Studios, Capitol Studios, Conway Recording Studios, Fredonia Studios; San Francisco, California: Bikini Wax Studio; Milan, Italy: L'isola Medastudios; Genoa, Italy: Studio 33.3; Inverigo, Italy: La Casa Digitale; Recco, Italy: Studio Mulinetti
- Genres: Pop, rock
- Length: 51:34
- Label: BMG
- Producers: Eros Ramazzotti, Claudio Guidetti, Celso Valli, Trevor Horn, Rick Nowels

Eros Ramazzotti chronology
Eros (1997)	Stilelibero (2000)	9 (2003)

Singles from Silelibero
- 1. "Fuoco nel fuoco" Released: 2000; 2. "Il Mio amore per Te" Released: 2001; 3. "Più che Puoi" Released: 2001; 4. "Un Angelo non È" Released: 2001; 5. "L'Ombra del Gigante" Released: 2001

Professional ratings
Review scores
Source	Rating
Allmusic	4/5 stars

Stilelibero (Freestyle) is the eighth studio album by Italian rock singer Eros Ramazzotti, released on October 30, 2000, on the BMG label. The album, featuring three tracks produced by Trevor Horn and two by Rick Nowels, was recorded in a variety of locations in London, California and Italy. Stilelibero was a commercial success, topping the Italian albums chart, as did the lead single, "Fuoco nel fuoco" also topping the singles chart. "Più che puoi", a duet with Cher, also reached the Italian top 20.

== Track listing ==
=== Stilelibero ===
No.	Title	Writer(s)	Producer(s)	Length
1.	"L'ombra del gigante"	Eros Ramazzotti, Claudio Guidetti, Adelio Cogliati, Lorenzo Cherubini	Trevor Horn	4:42
2.	"Fuoco nel fuoco"	Ramazzotti, Guidetti, Cogliati	Rick Nowels	4:02
3.	"Lo spirito degli alberi"	Ramazzotti, Guidetti, Alberto Salerno	Celso Valli	4:11
4.	"Un angelo non é"	Ramazzotti, Guidetti, Cogliati	Horn	4:38
5.	"L'aquila e il condor"	Ramazzotti, Guidetti, Cogliati, Maurizio Fabrizio	Ramazzotti, Guidetti	4:26
6.	"Più che puoi" (duet with Cher)	Ramazzotti, Cogliati, Antonio Galbiati, Cher	Nowels	4:11
7.	"Il mio amore per te"	Ramazzotti, Cogliati, Giuseppe Dettori, Luca Chiaravalli	Valli	4:14
8.	"E ancor mi chiedo"	Ramazzotti, Guidetti, Cogliati	Ramazzotti, Guidetti	4:22
9.	"Improvvisa luce ad est"	Ramazzotti, Guidetti, Cherubini, Vladimiro Tosseto	Valli	4:41
10.	"Nell'azzurrità"	Ramazzotti, Guidetti, Cogliati, Fabrizio	Ramazzotti, Guidetti	4:15
11.	"Amica donna mia"	Ramazzotti, Guidetti, Cogliati	Horn	4:00
12.	"Per me per sempre"	Ramazzotti, Guidetti, Cogliati, Fabrizio	Ramazzotti, Guidetti	3:52

=== Estilo libre ===
No.	Title	Writer(s)	Length
1.	"La sombra del gigante"	Ramazzotti, Guidetti, Cogliati, Cherubini	4:42
2.	"Fuego en el fuego"	Ramazzotti, Guidetti, Cogliati	4:02
3.	"El alma de los arboles"	Ramazzotti, Guidetti, Salerno	4:11
4.	"Un angel no es"	Ramazzotti, Guidetti, Cogliati	4:38
5.	"El aguila y el condor"	Ramazzotti, Guidetti, Cogliati, Fabrizio	4:26
6.	"Più che puoi" (duet with Cher)	Ramazzotti, Cogliati, Galbiati, Cher	4:11
7.	"Mi amor por ti"	Ramazzotti, Cogliati, Dettori, Chiaravalli	4:14
8.	"Quiero saberlo"	Ramazzotti, Guidetti, Cogliati	4:22
9.	"Y en el este una luz"	Ramazzotti, Guidetti, Cherubini, Tosseto	4:41
10.	"Azul sin par"	Ramazzotti, Guidetti, Cogliati, Fabrizio	4:15
11.	"Mujer amiga mia"	Ramazzotti, Guidetti, Cogliati	4:00
12.	"Para mi sera por siempre"	Ramazzotti, Guidetti, Cogliati, Fabrizio	3:52

== Charts ==
=== Weekly charts ===
Weekly chart performance for Stilelibero
Chart (2000–01)	Peak position
Austrian Albums (Ö3 Austria)	3
Belgian Albums (Ultratop Flanders)	6
Belgian Albums (Ultratop Wallonia)	1
Dutch Albums (Album Top 100)	9
European Top 100 Albums (Billboard)	3
Finnish Albums (Suomen virallinen lista)	9
French Albums (SNEP)	3
Greek International Albums (IFPI Greece)	1
German Albums (Offizielle Top 100)	2
Hungarian Albums (MAHASZ)	5
Italian Albums (FIMI)	2
Norwegian Albums (VG-lista)	17
Polish Albums (ZPAV)	26
Russian International Albums (InterMedia)	1
Spanish Albums Chart (Promusicae) Estilo libre	3
Swedish Albums (Sverigetopplistan)	15
Swiss Albums (Schweizer Hitparade)	1
US Latin Pop Albums (Billboard) Estilo libre	6
US Top Latin Albums (Billboard) Estilo libre	11
US Top World Albums (Billboard)	14

2000 year-end chart rankings for Stilibero
Chart (2000)	Position
European Albums (Music & Media)	60

=== "Fuoco nel fuoco" ===
Weekly chart rankings for "Fuoco nel fuoco"
Chart (2000–01)	Peak position
Austria (Ö3 Austria Top 40)	29
Belgium (Ultratop 50 Flanders)	47
Belgium (Ultratop 50 Wallonia)	4
France (SNEP)	21
Germany (GfK)	50
Italy (FIMI)	1
Netherlands (Single Top 100)	79
Switzerland (Schweizer Hitparade)	4

Year-end chart rankings for "Fuoco nel fuoco"
Chart (2000)	Position
Belgium (Ultratop 50 Wallonia)	56
European Airplay (Border Breakers)	5
Switzerland (Schweizer Hitparade)	48

== Sales and certifications ==
Region	Certification	Certified units/sales
Austria (IFPI Austria)	Platinum	50,000^{*}
Belgium (BRMA)	Platinum	50,000^{*}
Croatia (HDU)	Gold	
Denmark (IFPI Danmark)	Gold	25,000^{^}
Finland (Musiikkituottajat)	Gold	25,769
France (SNEP)	Platinum	300,000^{*}
Germany (BVMI)	2× Platinum	600,000^{^}
Greece (IFPI Greece)	Platinum	30,000^{^}
Hungary (MAHASZ)	Gold	
Italy (FIMI)	9× Platinum	900,000^{*}
Mexico (AMPROFON)	Platinum	150,000^{^}
Netherlands (NVPI)	Gold	40,000^{^}
Poland (ZPAV)	Gold	50,000^{*}
Spain (Promusicae)	Platinum	100,000^{^}
Sweden (GLF)	Gold	40,000^{^}
Switzerland (IFPI Switzerland)	4× Platinum	200,000^{^}
United States (RIAA)	Platinum (Latin)	100,000^{^}
Summaries
Europe (IFPI)	2× Platinum	2,000,000^{*}
^{*} Sales figures based on certification alone.^{^} Shipments figures based on certification alone.
