= All or Nothing (Cher song) =

1999 single by Cher

Single by Cher

from the album Believe
- B-side: "Dov'è l'amore"
- Released: June 7, 1999
- Genre: Pop; dance
- Length: 3:58
- Label: Warner Bros.; WEA
- Songwriters: Mark Taylor; Paul Barry
- Producers: Mark Taylor; Brian Rawling

Cher singles chronology
| "Strong Enough" (1999) | "All or Nothing" (1999) | "Dov'è l'amore" (1999) |

Music video
- "All or Nothing" on YouTube

"All or Nothing" is a song by American singer and actress Cher from her 22nd studio album, Believe (1998). It was released as the third international single from Believe on June 7, 1999, by Warner Bros. and WEA. It is written by Mark Taylor and Paul Barry, and produced by Taylor and Brian Rawling. "All or Nothing" reached the top 40 of the US Billboard Hot 100 Singles Sales chart at number 38 and peaked at number one on the Billboard Dance Club Play chart. In Europe, the single was a top-10 hit in the Czech Republic, Finland, Hungary, and Scotland. The accompanying music video depicts Cher performing the song onstage on her Do You Believe? tour.

== Critical reception ==
Chuck Taylor from Billboard magazine wrote that the song "leans closer to the pop side—like the No. 1 'Believe'—but is still the kind of pure dance extravaganza that brings nothing but exalted exuberance to the radio airwaves." He described it as a song "that is so joyous and well-executed that it makes life a little more satisfying than it was four minutes before." Can't Stop the Pop described it as "one of her most beautifully melancholic moments", adding that "it embraces the disco-heartbreak mood and carves its own identity." Bob Waliszewski of Plugged In stated that on "All or Nothing", "the artist tries to determine whether she should continue the seemingly futile pursuit of a love (I'm chasing shadows/We keep falling further apart/Do you care now?)."

== Music video ==
"All or Nothing"
The song was praised for the "ching synths to the juddering, pulsing bassline and the flourishes of blips and bleeps".

The music video for "All or Nothing" was shot while Cher was on tour for her album, Believe. Although most of the video features random clips of some of Cher's Do You Believe? tour performances, new footage was filmed in which Cher sang the song, wore a red wig and a silver outfit rather than the tour costume which Cher herself described as "Bozo the Clown-meets-Braveheart look." In 1999, the video was released on VHS and CD-R promos in North America, but later that year, it was included in the Taiwanese release of the Believe album. Prior to the release of the video in the UK and Europe, a video composed of scenes from the previous two videos—"Believe" and "Strong Enough"—was used as the official video was not completed in time.

A remix video was made which is very similar to the original version. The main difference is that the remix video is in black and white. Although Dan Rux most famously known as Dan-O-Rama made all the remix videos for the Believe album's singles (including a tour-only video mix), it is unknown whether he created the "All or Nothing" remix video. The remix used in the video is the Almighty Definitive mix.

== Track listings ==
=== "All or Nothing" ===
- UK CD1
1. "All or Nothing" – 3:58
2. "All or Nothing" (Almighty Definitive mix) – 8:32
3. "All or Nothing" (K-Klass Klub mix) – 7:02
- UK CD2
1. "All or Nothing" – 3:58
2. "All or Nothing" (Metro radio mix) – 3:59
3. "All or Nothing" (Almighty radio edit) – 3:37
4. "All or Nothing" (K-Klass radio mix) – 3:50
- UK 12-inch single

A1. "All or Nothing" (Almighty Definitive mix) – 8:32
B1. "All or Nothing" (K-Klass Klub mix) – 7:02
B2. "All or Nothing" (Bunker dub) – 7:17

- UK cassette single
1. "All or Nothing" – 3:58
2. "All or Nothing" (Almighty radio edit) – 3:37
- European CD single
1. "All or Nothing" (Metro mix) – 3:59
2. "All or Nothing" (Almighty Definitive mix) – 8:32
- Australian CD single
1. "All or Nothing" (Metro mix) – 3:59
2. "All or Nothing" (Almighty radio edit) – 3:37
3. "All or Nothing" (K-Klass radio mix) – 3:50
4. "All or Nothing" (Almighty Definitive mix) – 8:32
5. "All or Nothing" (K-Klass Klub mix) – 7:02
6. "Strong Enough" (Club 69 Future Anthem short mix edit) – 8:39
- Japanese CD single
1. "All or Nothing" – 3:58
2. "All or Nothing" (Metro mix) – 3:59
3. "All or Nothing" (Almighty radio edit) – 3:37
4. "All or Nothing" (K-Klass radio mix) – 3:50
5. "All or Nothing" (Almighty Definitive mix) – 8:32
6. "All or Nothing" (K-Klass Klub mix) – 7:01
7. "All or Nothing" (Bunker dub) – 7:16

=== "All or Nothing" / "Dov'è l'amore" ===
- US maxi-CD single
1. "All or Nothing" (Danny Tenaglia international mix)
2. "All or Nothing" (Metro radio mix)
3. "All or Nothing" (Danny Tenaglia Cherbot Vocadub)
4. "All or Nothing" (Almighty Definitive mix)
5. "Dov'è l'amore" (Todd Terry's TNT club mix)
6. "Dov'è l'amore" (Tony Moran's Anthem mix)
7. "Dov'è l'amore" (Ray Roc's Latin soul vocal mix)
8. "Dov'è l'amore" (Tee's radio mix)
9. "Dov'è l'amore" (Tony Moran's Anthem 7-inch mix)
10. "Dov'è l'amore" (Ray Roc's radio mix)
- US 2×12-inch single

A1. "All or Nothing" (Danny Tenaglia international mix) – 9:46
A2. "All or Nothing" (Almighty Definitive mix) – 8:32
B1. "All or Nothing" (Danny Tenaglia Cherbot Vocadub) – 12:37
B2. "All or Nothing" (Metro radio mix) – 3:59
C1. "Dov'è l'amore" (Todd Terry's TNT club mix) – 6:56
C2. "Dov'è l'amore" (Tony Moran's Anthem mix) – 9:54
D1. "Dov'è l'amore" (Ray Roc's Latin soul vocal mix) – 9:37
D2. "Dov'è l'amore" (Todd Terry's MT's club mix) – 6:52

== Charts ==
=== Weekly charts ===
| Chart (1999) | Peak position |
|---|---|
| Australia (ARIA) | 62 |
| Austria (Ö3 Austria Top 40) | 38 |
| Belgium (Ultratop 50 Flanders) | 28 |
| Belgium (Ultratop 50 Wallonia) | 28 |
| Czech Republic (IFPI) | 3 |
| Denmark (Tracklisten) | 14 |
| Europe (Eurochart Hot 100) | 39 |
| Europe (European Hit Radio) | 9 |
| Finland (Suomen virallinen lista) | 4 |
| France (SNEP) | 30 |
| France Airplay (SNEP) | 25 |
| Germany (GfK) | 44 |
| Hungary (Mahasz) | 5 |
| Ireland (IRMA) | 26 |
| Italy Airplay (Music & Media) | 19 |
| Latvia (Latvijas Top 197) | 18 |
| Netherlands (Dutch Top 40 Tipparade) | 14 |
| Netherlands (Single Top 100) | 61 |
| New Zealand (Recorded Music NZ) | 28 |
| Scottish Singles Sales (Official Charts) | 10 |
| Spain Airplay (Music & Media) | 19 |
| Sweden (Sverigetopplistan) | 58 |
| Switzerland (Schweizer Hitparade) | 30 |
| UK Singles (Official Charts) | 12 |
| US Dance Club Songs (Billboard) | 1 |
| US Dance Singles Sales (Billboard) with "Dov'è l'amore" | 2 |
| US Hot 100 Singles Sales (Billboard) | 38 |

=== Year-end charts ===
| Chart (1999) | Position |
|---|---|
| Europe (European Radio 100 Singles) | 41 |
| Latvia (Latvijas Top 197) | 184 |
| Romania (Romanian Top 100) | 20 |
| US Dance Club Play (Billboard) | 4 |

| Chart (2000) | Position |
|---|---|
| US Maxi-Singles Sales (Billboard) | 25 |

=== All-time charts ===
| Chart | Position |
|---|---|
| Poland (Radio Złote Przeboje) | 28 |

== Release history ==
| Region | Date | Format(s) | Label(s) | Ref. |
|---|---|---|---|---|
| United Kingdom | June 7, 1999 | CD; cassette | WEA | |
| Japan | July 28, 1999 | CD | WEA | |
| United States | September 13, 1999 | Adult contemporary; hot adult contemporary; modern adult contemporary radio | Warner Bros. | |
| United States | September 14, 1999 | Contemporary hit radio | Warner Bros. | |
