= List of awards and nominations received by Cher =

Cher awards and nominations
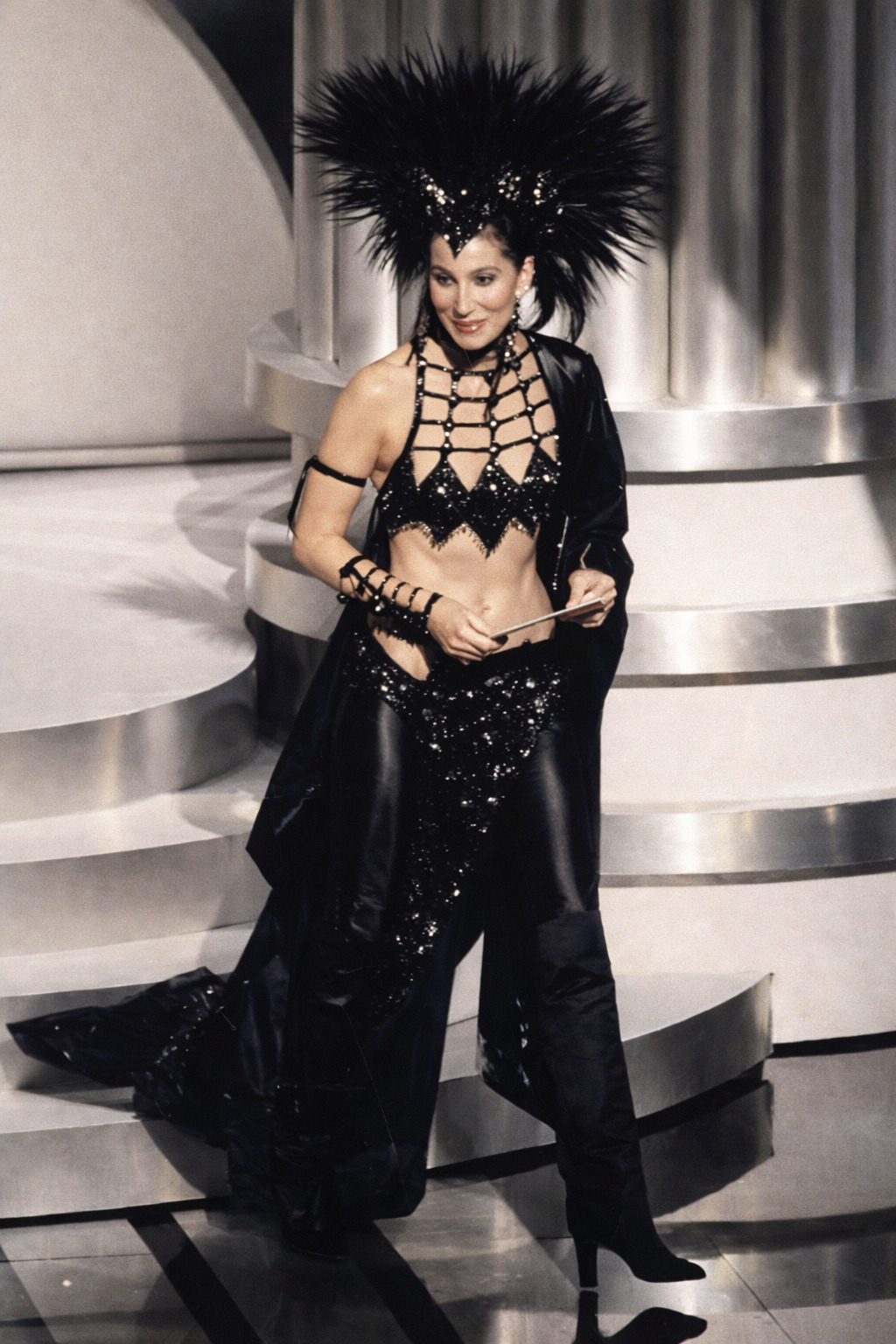
- Cher at the 1986 Academy Awards
Awards and nominations
Award	Wins	Nominations
Academy Awards	1	2
British Academy Film Awards	0	2
Primetime Emmy Awards	1	7
News and Documentary Emmy Awards	0	1
Golden Globe Awards	3	6
Grammy Awards	2	8
Satellite Awards	1	3

Totals (Note: Certain award groups do not simply award one winner. They acknowledge several different recipients, have runners-up, and have third place. Since this is a specific recognition and is different from losing an award, runner-up mentions are considered wins in this award tally. For simplification and to avoid errors, each award in this list has been presumed to have had a prior nomination.)
- Wins: 100
- Nominations: 208

Cher is an American singer and actress whose distinguished career spans music, film, fashion, and television, and has received numerous awards and honors for her creative achievements and longstanding commitment to humanitarian causes. She has won one Academy Award, two Grammy Awards, one Primetime Emmy Award, three Golden Globe Awards, and a Best Actress award at the Cannes Film Festival.

Cher received numerous honorary accolades, including a star on the Hollywood Walk of Fame (as a part of Sonny & Cher) in 1998, GLAAD Vanguard Award in 1998, World Music Award for Outstanding Contribution to the Music Industry in 1999, Billboard Icon Award in 2017. In 2018, she was presented with Kennedy Center Honor, and iHeartRadio Icon Award in 2024.

In 2024, Cher was inducted into the Rock and Roll Hall of Fame, and has received a Grammy Lifetime Achievement Award in 2026.

== Major associations ==
=== Academy Awards ===
Year	Category	Nominee / work	Result	Ref.
1984	Best Supporting Actress	Silkwood	Nominated	
1988	Best Actress	Moonstruck	Won	

=== BAFTA Awards ===
Year	Category	Nominee / work	Result	Ref.
British Academy Film Awards
1985	Best Actress in a Supporting Role	Silkwood	Nominated	
1989	Best Actress in a Leading Role	Moonstruck	Nominated	

=== Emmy Awards ===
Year	Category	Nominee / work	Result	Ref.
News and Documentary Emmy Awards
2018	Outstanding Short Documentary	Edith+Eddie	Nominated	
Primetime Emmy Awards
1972	Outstanding Variety Series – Musical	The Sonny & Cher Comedy Hour	Nominated	
1972	Outstanding Single Program – Variety or Musical – Variety and Popular Music	The Sonny & Cher Comedy Hour	Nominated	
1973	Outstanding Variety Musical Series	The Sonny & Cher Comedy Hour	Nominated	
1974	Outstanding Music-Variety Series	The Sonny & Cher Comedy Hour	Nominated	
1975	Outstanding Comedy-Variety or Music Series	Cher	Nominated	
2000	Outstanding Individual Performance in a Variety or Music Program	Cher: Live in Concert – From the MGM Grand in Las Vegas	Nominated	
2003	Outstanding Variety, Music or Comedy Special	Cher: The Farewell Tour	Won	

=== Golden Globe Awards ===
Year	Category	Nominee / work	Result	Ref.
1974	Best Actress – Television Series Musical or Comedy	The Sonny & Cher Comedy Hour	Won	
1983	Best Supporting Actress – Motion Picture	Come Back to the 5 & Dime, Jimmy Dean, Jimmy Dean	Nominated	
1984	Best Supporting Actress – Motion Picture	Silkwood	Won	
1986	Best Actress in a Motion Picture – Drama	Mask	Nominated	
1988	Best Actress in a Motion Picture – Musical or Comedy	Moonstruck	Won	
1997	Best Supporting Actress – Series, Miniseries or Television Film	If These Walls Could Talk	Nominated	

=== Grammy Awards ===
Year	Category	Nominee / work	Result	Ref.
1966	Best New Artist	Sonny & Cher	Nominated	
1972	Best Pop Vocal Performance, Female	"Gypsys, Tramps & Thieves"	Nominated	
1972	Best Pop Vocal Performance by a Duo, Group or Chorus	"All I Ever Need Is You"	Nominated	
2000	Best Pop Vocal Album	Believe	Nominated	
2000	Record of the Year	"Believe"	Nominated	
2000	Best Dance Recording	"Believe"	Won	
2004	Best Dance Recording	"Love One Another"	Nominated	
2026	Grammy Lifetime Achievement Award †	Cher	Won	

=== Satellite Awards ===
Year	Category	Nominee / work	Result	Ref.
1997	Best Supporting Actress – Series, Miniseries or Television Film	If These Walls Could Talk	Nominated	
2010	Best Original Song	"You Haven't Seen the Last of Me"	Won	
2018	Best Original Song	"Prayers for This World"	Nominated	

== Miscellaneous awards ==
Awards and nominations received by Cher
Award	Year (Note: The listed year refers to the date of the ceremony.)	Category	Nominee / work	Result	Ref.
Alliance of Women Film Journalists	2010	Perseverance Award	Cher	Nominated	
Amadeus Austrian Music Awards	2000	International Solo Pop/Rock Artist	Cher	Nominated	
American Comedy Awards	1988	Funniest Actress in a Motion Picture (Leading Role)	Moonstruck	Nominated	
American Guild of Variety Artists Awards	1972	Musical Group	Sonny & Cher	Won	
American Guild of Variety Artists Awards	1973	Vocal Act of the Year	Sonny & Cher	Won	
American Music Awards	2000	Favorite Adult Contemporary Artist	Cher	Nominated	
American Music Awards	2003	Favorite Adult Contemporary Artist	Cher	Nominated	
American Music Awards	2003	Michael Jackson International Artist of the Year	Cher	Nominated	
amfAR	2015	Award of Inspiration †	Cher	Won	
Anděl Awards	1999	Special Award †	Cher	Won	
Armenian Music Awards	2008	Legend Award †	Cher	Won	
Armenian Music Awards	2014	Legend Award	Cher	Nominated	
ARTISTdirect Online Music Awards	1999	Favorite Female Artist	Cher	Nominated	
ARTISTdirect Online Music Awards	2000	Favorite Tattooed Artist	Cher	Nominated	
Attitude Awards	2013	Legend Award †	Cher	Won	
Audie Awards	2026	Autobiography/Memoir	Cher: The Memoir, Part One	Nominated	
Bambi Awards	2001	International Pop	Cher	Won	
Bambi Awards	2025	Legend Award †	Cher	Won	
Best of Las Vegas Awards	2010	Best All-Around Performer	Cher	Won	
Best of Las Vegas Awards	2011	Best Singer	Cher	Won	
BDS Certified Spin Awards	2002	400,000 Spins	"Believe"	Won	
Billboard Music Awards	1999	Hot 100 Single of the Year	"Believe"	Won	
Billboard Music Awards	1999	Top Female Artist	Cher	Nominated	
Billboard Music Awards	1999	Female Hot 100 Artist of the Year	Cher	Nominated	
Billboard Music Awards	2002	Dance/Club Play Artist of the Year	Cher	Won	
Billboard Music Awards	2002	Artist Achievement Award †	Cher	Won	
Billboard Music Awards	2017	Billboard Icon Award †	Cher	Won	
Billboard Music Video Awards	1999	Dance: Best Clip	"Believe"	Nominated	
Blockbuster Entertainment Awards	2000	Favorite Female Artist – Pop	Believe	Won	
Blockbuster Entertainment Awards	2000	Favorite Single (Internet Only)	"Believe"	Nominated	
BMI London Awards	2013	4 Million Performance Award	"Believe"	Won	
Bravo Otto (Germany)	1966	Best Group	Sonny & Cher	Nominated	
Bravo Otto (Germany)	1967	Best Group	Sonny & Cher	Nominated	
Bravo Otto (Germany)	1972	Female Singer - Pop	Cher	Nominated	
Bravo Otto (Germany)	1988	Best Actress	Cher	Nominated	
Bravo Otto (Germany)	1991	Best Actress	Cher	Nominated	
Bravo Otto (Germany)	1991	Female Singer - Pop	Cher	Silver	
Bravo Otto (Germany)	1992	Female Singer - Pop	Cher	Nominated	
British LGBT Awards	2016	Global Icon	Cher	Nominated	
Broadway World Las Vegas Awards	2011	Best Resident Show	Cher	Won	
CableACE Awards	1983	Actress in a Variety Program	Cher... A Celebration at Caesars	Won	
California Music Awards	2000	Outstanding Female Vocalist	Cher	Nominated	
Cannes Film Festival	1985	Best Actress	Mask	Won (Note: Tied with Norma Aleandro for The Official Story.)	
Capital Gold Legends Awards	2003	Legendary Female	Cher	Nominated	
CFDA Fashion Awards	1999	Influence on Fashion Award †	Cher	Won	
Chita Rivera Awards	2019	Ambassador for the Arts Award †	Cher	Won	
CinEuphoria Awards	2020	Career Award †	Cher	Won	
Critics' Choice Documentary Awards	2017	Best Song in a Documentary	"Prayers for This World"	Nominated	
Critics' Choice Movie Awards	2011	Best Song	"You Haven't Seen the Last of Me"	Nominated	
Dallas Times Herald	1972	Special Award (Note: For raising money for the city symphony.) †	Sonny & Cher	Won	
Danish Music Awards	1999	Foreign Hit of the Year	"Believe"	Won	
David di Donatello	1988	Best Foreign Actress	Moonstruck	Won	
Drama League Awards	2019	Outstanding Production of a Broadway or Off-Broadway Musical	The Cher Show	Nominated	
Echo	1992	International Female Artist	Cher	Won	
Echo	1993	International Rock/Pop Female Artist	Cher	Nominated	
Echo	2000	International Rock/Pop Female Artist	Believe	Won	
Expodisc	1973	Superstar Award	Cher	Nominated	
Fragrance Foundation Awards	2020	Consumer Choice – Women's Popular	Cher Eau de Couture	Won	
Girls’ Choice Awards	2019	Girls' Choice Music Icon	Cher	Nominated	
GLAAD Media Awards	1998	GLAAD Vanguard Award †	Cher	Won	
Glamour Women of the Year Awards	2010	Lifetime Achievement Award †	Cher	Won	
Golden Apple Awards	1988	Female Star of the Year	Cher	Nominated	
Golden Raspberry Awards	2011	Worst Supporting Actress	Burlesque	Nominated	
Goodreads Choice Awards	2025	Readers' Favorite Memoir	Cher: The Memoir, Part One	Nominated	
Hasty Pudding Theatricals	1985	Hasty Pudding Woman of the Year †	Cher	Won	
HitAwards	1999	International Female Artist of the Year	Cher	Nominated	
HitAwards	1999	Hit of the Year	"Believe"	Nominated	
Hollywood Music in Media Awards	2017	Best Original Song in a Documentary	"Prayers for This World"	Nominated	
Hungarian Music Awards	2000	International Pop Album of the Year	Believe	Won	
iHeartRadio Music Awards	2024	iHeartRadio Icon Award †	Cher	Won	
iHeartRadio Music Awards	2025	Favorite Surprise Guest	Cher	Nominated	
International Dance Music Awards	1999	Best Hi NRG 12"	"Believe"	Won	
International Dance Music Awards	1999	Best Pop 12" Dance Record	"Believe"	Won	
IDA Documentary Awards	2017	Best Documentary Short	Edith+Eddie	Won	
IRMA Music Awards	1992	International Female Artist	Cher	Won	
iVillage Entertainment Awards	2011	Most Welcome Celebrity Comeback	Cher	Won	
Japan Gold Disc Awards	2012	Burlesque	Soundtrack of the Year	Won	
Kansas City Film Critics Circle	1987	Best Actress	Moonstruck	Won	
Katharine Hepburn Cultural Arts Center	2020	Spirit of Katharine Hepburn Award †	Cher	Won	
KRLA Beat International Pop Music Awards	1966	Female Vocalist	Cher	Won	
KRLA Beat International Pop Music Awards	1966	New Female Vocalist	Cher	Won	
KRLA Beat International Pop Music Awards	1966	Duo	Sonny & Cher	Won	
LA Music Awards	1992	Artist of the Year	Cher	Nominated	
LA Music Awards	1992	Best Female Rock Vocalist	Cher	Nominated	
LA Music Awards	1992	Best Female Pop Vocalist	Cher	Won	
Lab School of Washington	1985	Outstanding Learning Disabled Achiever Award †	Cher	Won	
Ladies' Home Journal Poll Awards	1988	Star of the Year	Cher	Won	
Las Vegas Awards	1980	Female Musical Star	Cher	Nominated	
Las Vegas Entertainment Awards	2026	Lifetime Achievement Award	Cher	Pending	
Las Vegas Magazine Awards	1981	Female Performer of the Year	Cher	Won	
The Laurel Foundation	2022	Youth Empowerment Award †	Cher	Won	
Los 40 Music Awards	2010	Los Premios 40 Honorary Award †	Cher	Won	
Los Angeles Film Critics Association Awards	1982	Best Supporting Actress	Come Back to the 5 & Dime, Jimmy Dean, Jimmy Dean	Runner-up	
Los Angeles Film Critics Association Awards	1983	Best Supporting Actress	Silkwood	Runner-up	
Lunas del Auditorio	2005	Best Foreign Language Pop Artist	Cher	Nominated	
Melody Maker Pop Poll Awards	1967	International: Girl Singer	Cher	9th place (Note: Tied with Sandie Shaw.)	
MTV Australia Awards	2005	VH1 Music First Award †	Cher	Won	
MTV Video Music Awards	1988	Best Female Video	"I Found Someone"	Nominated	
MTV Video Music Awards	1999	Best Dance Video	"Believe"	Nominated	
Music & Media Year-End Awards	1991	Top 3 Female Artists (Albums)	Cher	3rd place	
Music & Media Year-End Awards	1991	Top 3 Female Artists (Singles)	Cher	Won	
Music & Media Year-End Awards	1999	Top 10 Artists (Albums)	Cher	Won	
Music & Media Year-End Awards	1999	Top 10 Artists (Singles)	Cher	3rd place	
Music & Media Year-End Awards	1999	Top 10 Female Artists (Albums)	Cher	Won	
Music & Media Year-End Awards	1999	Top 10 Female Artists (Singles)	Cher	3rd place	
Music & Media Year-End Awards	2000	Top 10 Female Artists (Albums)	Cher	10th place	
Music Control	1999	Music Control Airplay Award	Cher	Won	
Music Operators of America Awards	1972	Artists of the Year	Sonny & Cher	Won	
NARM Awards	1966	Most Promising Female Vocalist	Cher	Nominated	
NARM Awards	1966	Best Selling American Vocal Group	Sonny & Cher	Nominated	
NARM Awards	1967	Most Promising Female Vocalist	Cher	Nominated	
NARM Awards	1973	Female Artist	Cher	Nominated	
Nastro d'Argento	1988	Best Foreign Actress	Moonstruck	Won (Note: Tied with Stéphane Audran for Babette's Feast.)	
National Society of Film Critics	1983	Best Supporting Actress	Silkwood	2nd place	
New Mexico Film Critics Awards	2017	Best Original Song	"Prayers for This World"	Runner-up	
New York Festivals TV & Film Awards	2022	Documentary	Cher and the Loneliest Elephant	Gold	
New York Film Critics Circle	1983	Best Supporting Actress	Silkwood	Runner-up	
NRJ Music Awards	2000	International Female Artist of the Year	Cher	Nominated	
NRJ Music Awards	2000	International Song of the Year	"Believe"	Nominated	
NRJ Music Awards	2000	Best Concert of the Year	Do You Believe?	Nominated	
NRJ Music Awards	2000	Best Music Website of the Year	Cher	Nominated	
O Music Awards	2011	Must Follow Artist On Twitter	Cher	Nominated	
OFTA Awards	1997	Best Direction of a Motion Picture or Miniseries	If These Walls Could Talk	Nominated	
OFTA Awards	2000	Best Host or Performer of a Variety, Musical, or Comedy Special	Cher	Won	
OFTA Awards	2000	Best Variety, Musical, or Comedy Special	Cher: Live in Concert – From the MGM Grand in Las Vegas	Nominated	
OFTA Awards	2018	Best Adapted Song	"Fernando"	Nominated	
People's Choice Awards	1976	Favorite Female Television Performer	Cher	Nominated	
People's Choice Awards	1976	Favorite All Around Female Entertainer	Cher	Nominated	
People's Choice Awards	1988	Favorite Motion Picture Actress	Cher	Nominated	
People's Choice Awards	1989	Favorite All-Around Female Star	Cher	Won	
People's Choice Awards	1990	Favorite All-Around Female Entertainer	Cher	Nominated	
People's Choice Awards	1991	Favorite All-Around Female Entertainer	Cher	Nominated	
People's Choice Awards	2019	Favorite Concert Tour	Here We Go Again Tour	Nominated	
Pollstar Awards	2000	Most Creative Stage Production	Do You Believe?	Nominated	
Pollstar Awards	2003	Most Creative Stage Production	Living Proof: The Farewell Tour	Nominated	
Pollstar Awards	2004	Most Creative Stage Production	Living Proof: The Farewell Tour	Nominated	
Pollstar Awards	2004	Major Tour of the Year	Living Proof: The Farewell Tour	Nominated	
Premios Amigo	1999	Best International Solo Artist	Cher	Won	
Premios Amigo	1999	Best International Album	Believe	Won	
Premios Ondas	2001	Special Award for Musical Career †	Cher	Won	
Queerty Awards	2019	Badass	Cher	Runner-up	
Queerty Awards	2019	Queer Anthem	"Gimme! Gimme! Gimme! (A Man After Midnight)"	Nominated	
The Record of the Year	1998	The Record of the Year	"Believe"	Nominated	
Rennbahn Express	1992	Female Singer of the Year	Cher	Won	
Rennbahn Express	1999	Female Singer of the Year	Cher	10th place	
Rockbjörnen	1998	Foreign Song of the Year	"Believe"	Won	
Shidurei Israel Radio Awards	1975	Girl Singer	Cher	Won	
Shorty Awards	2016	Singer	Cher	Nominated	
Shorty Awards	2017	Celebrity	Cher	Nominated	
Teen Choice Awards	1999	Single of the Year	"Believe"	Nominated	
US Magazine Annual Readers' Awards	1982	Favorite Variety Star of the Year	Cher	Nominated	
US Magazine Annual Readers' Awards	1988	Sexiest Female Star of the Year	Cher	Won	
Video Awards (Note: Also known as Focus on Video.)	1992	Best How-to Instructional	CherFitness: A New Attitude	Won	
Video Awards	1993	Best How-to Instructional	CherFitness: Body Confidence	Won	
VSDA Awards	1992	Health and Fitness Homer	CherFitness: A New Attitude	Won	
White Party Palm Springs	2014	Icon Award: Artist †	Cher	Won	
WLS Radio's Hit Parade Awards	1968	Best Female	Cher	Won	
WLS Radio's Hit Parade Awards	1968	Best Duet	Sonny & Cher	Won	
Women in Film Honors	2000	Lucy Award †	If These Walls Could Talk	Won (Note: Shared with creators and cast of If These Walls Could Talk and If These Walls Could Talk 2.)	
Women's Image Network Awards	2013	Documentary Film	Dear Mom, Love Cher	Nominated	
Women's Image Network Awards	2013	Show Produced by a Woman	Dear Mom, Love Cher	Won	
World Awards	2004	World Arts Award †	Cher	Won	
World Music Awards	1999	Outstanding Contribution to the Music Industry †	Cher	Won	
World Music Awards	2014	World's Best Female Artist	Cher	Longlisted	
World Music Awards	2014	World's Best Live Act	Cher	Longlisted	
World Music Awards	2014	World's Best Entertainer of the Year	Cher	Longlisted	
World Music Awards	2014	World's Best Album	Closer to the Truth	Longlisted	
World Music Awards	2014	World's Best Song	"Woman's World"	Longlisted	
World Music Awards	2014	World's Best Video	"Woman's World"	Longlisted	
World Soundtrack Awards	2011	Best Original Song Written Directly for a Film	"You Haven't Seen the Last of Me"	Nominated	
XM Nation Music Awards	2005	Most Likely to Have Another "Final" Tour	Cher	Won	
Your Choice For The Film Awards	1986	Best Actress	Mask	Won	
Žebřík Music Awards	1993	Singer	Cher	10th place	

== Honors ==
Organization	Year	Honoree / work	Ref.
Equal Justice Now Honors	2024	Cher	
Grammy Hall of Fame	2017	"I Got You Babe"	
Grauman's Chinese Theatre Ceremony	2010	Cher	
Hollywood Walk of Fame	1998	Sonny & Cher	
Kennedy Center Honors	2018	Cher	
Rock and Roll Hall of Fame	2024	Cher	

Key
†	Indicates non-competitive categories

== See also ==
- Cher albums discography
- Cher singles discography
- List of songs recorded by Cher
- Cher filmography
- Cher videography
- EGOT
- List of actors with Academy Award nominations
- List of actors with more than one Academy Award nomination in the acting categories
