= Cher filmography =

Cher
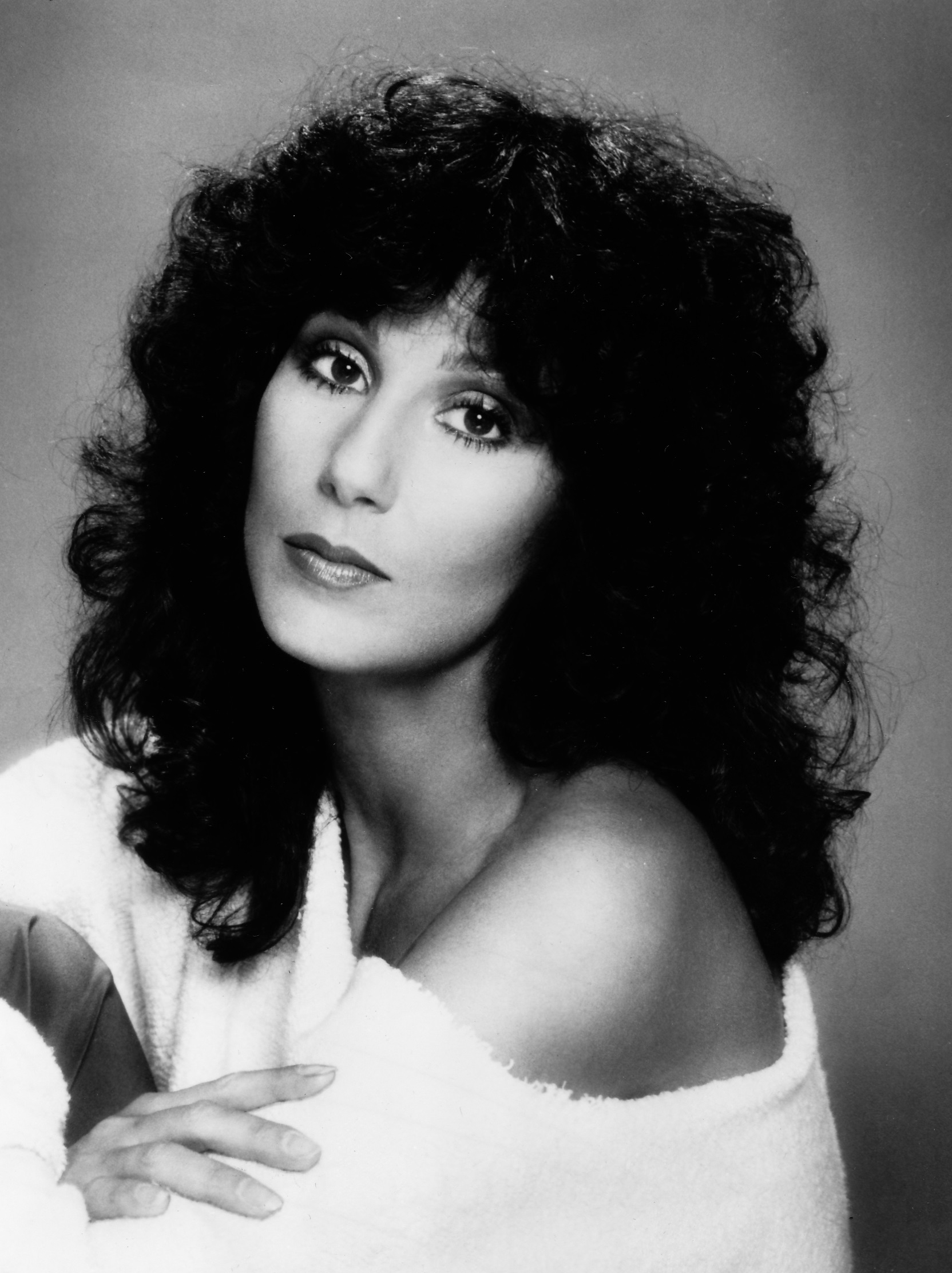
- 1970s publicity photo of Cher
- Born: Cherilyn Sarkisian; May 20, 1946 (age 80); El Centro, California, U.S.
- Years active: 1965–present

Throughout her acting career, Cher has mainly starred in comedy, drama, and romance films. She has appeared in twenty films, including two as a cameo. She has also appeared in one starring theater role, one video game role, numerous television commercials and directed a piece of the motion picture If These Walls Could Talk in 1996 and some of her music videos of the Geffen-era in late 1980s and in early 1990s. Cher has starred in various international television commercials, as well as high-profile print advertising for Lori Davis (1992). Before she started her film career, she had a couple of hits in the 1960s, as a solo artist, and with her ex-husband Sonny Bono as the couple Sonny & Cher.

Her first appearance as an actress was in 1967 in the American television series The Man from U.N.C.L.E. as the model Ramona. That same year, she started her film career with Sonny Bono in the poorly received-film Good Times and later as a solo actress in the low budget feature Chastity. Since then she has starred in numerous independent and Hollywood motion pictures. She made her Broadway debut in Robert Altman's Come Back to the Five and Dime, Jimmy Dean, Jimmy Dean in 1982. The play was a critical and commercial success and Cher received strong reviews for her stage work (even Frank Rich called her "ingratiating") and paved the way for her to be cast in the film version the next year, that garnered her a Golden Globe nomination. She was next cast alongside Meryl Streep and Kurt Russell in the critically hailed drama Silkwood (1983) directed by Mike Nichols, inspired by the true-life story of Karen Silkwood, in which her character was a lesbian who worked at the Kerr-McGee plant in Cimarron, Oklahoma. It was a commercial success and grossed $35 million in the United States alone. Cher then appeared in the drama Mask (1985) directed by Peter Bogdanovich and with Eric Stoltz, Sam Elliott and Laura Dern. The film is based on the life and early death of Roy L. "Rocky" Dennis, a boy who suffered from craniodiaphyseal dysplasia. The film was considered her first critical and commercial success as a leading actress and firmly established her as an actress. For her role as a mother of a severely disfigured boy, Cher won the Best Actress prize at the Cannes Film Festival.

In 1987, she starred in three films: the thriller Suspect, with Dennis Quaid and Liam Neeson; the film has been credited for the high quality of acting despite the severe loopholes of the story. In particular, Cher, in the lead role, has received positive reviews. The fantasy film The Witches of Eastwick, with Jack Nicholson, Susan Sarandon and Michelle Pfeiffer; and the romantic comedy Moonstruck with Nicolas Cage and Olympia Dukakis. Moonstruck is also her most commercial success to date, grossing over $80 million in the United States alone. During 1989–1991, Cher refused many roles, like The War of the Roses, Thelma & Louise and The Addams Family for starring in Richard Benjamin's Mermaids with Bob Hoskins, Winona Ryder, and a then 9-year-old Christina Ricci. The film was a modest success drawing only $35 million in tickets in the U.S. Cher made cameo appearances in the Robert Altman films The Player (1992) and Prêt-à-Porter (1994). She starred in the poorly received film Faithful (1996) with Ryan O'Neal and Chazz Palminteri, in the role of the betrayed wife. Then, in 1999, Cher co-starred in the well-received Franco Zeffirelli film Tea With Mussolini with Judi Dench, Maggie Smith, Joan Plowright and Lily Tomlin. Cher had a minor appearance in the Farrelly Brothers comedy Stuck on You (2003) with Matt Damon and Greg Kinnear, in which she plays herself and Honey, a character of a TV series. She also spoofed her own image, appearing in bed with a high school boyfriend (Frankie Muniz). In 2010, Cher appeared alongside pop singer Christina Aguilera in the Steven Antin directed musical film Burlesque, her last major starring movie role to date. She also appeared in Mamma Mia! Here We Go Again (2018) alongside Meryl Streep and Pierce Brosnan.

Cher has also contributed music to films, like "Alfie", "After All" "The Shoop Shoop Song (It's in His Kiss)" and "You Haven't Seen the Last of Me". Cher has received many awards and nominations for her work in films. She was nominated six times for the Golden Globe Awards, winning it three times; in 1974 for Best Actress – Television Series Musical or Comedy, in 1983 for Best Supporting Actress in a Drama for her role in Silkwood and in 1987 for Best Actress in a Comedy for her role in Moonstruck. She was also nominated twice for the Academy Award, in 1984 for her role in Silkwood, and in 1987, when she won the Best Actress award for her role in Moonstruck.

== Film ==
Year	Title	Role	Notes
1965	Wild on the Beach	Herself	
1967	Good Times	Herself	
1969	Chastity	Chastity	
1982	Come Back to the Five and Dime, Jimmy Dean, Jimmy Dean	Sissy	
1983	Silkwood	Dolly Pelliker	
1985	Mask	Rusty Dennis	
1987	The Witches of Eastwick	Alexandra Medford	
1987	Suspect	Kathleen Riley	
1987	Moonstruck	Loretta Castorini	
1990	Mermaids	Rachel Flax	
1992	The Player	Herself	Cameo appearance
1994	Ready to Wear (Prêt-à-Porter)	Herself	Cameo appearance
1996	Faithful	Margaret Connor	
1999	Tea with Mussolini	Elsa Strauss	
2003	Stuck on You	Herself	
2010	Burlesque	Tess Scali	
2011	Zookeeper	Janet the Lioness (voice)	
2018	Edith+Eddie	—N/a	Executive producer
2018	Mamma Mia! Here We Go Again	Ruby Sheridan	
2020	Bobbleheads: The Movie	Herself (voice)	Cameo appearance
2024	Little Bites	—N/a	Executive producer

== Television ==
Year	Title	Role	Notes
1967	The Man from U.N.C.L.E.	Ramona	Episode: "The Hot Number Affair"
1968	Rowan & Martin's Laugh-In	Herself	
1970	The Sonny & Cher Nitty Gritty Hour	Herself (co-host)	
1971	Love, American Style	April	Episode: "Love and the Sack"
1971	The First Nine Months Are the Hardest	Herself	
1971– 1974	The Sonny & Cher Comedy Hour	Herself (co-host), various characters	
1972	The New Scooby-Doo Movies	Herself (voice)	Episode: "The Secret of Shark Island"
1975– 1976	Cher	Herself (host), various characters	
1976– 1977	The Sonny and Cher Show	Herself (co-host), various characters	
1978	Cher... Special	Herself (host), various characters	
1979	Cher... and Other Fantasies	Herself	Also executive producer
1981	Standing Room Only: Cher in Concert	Herself	Also known as Live in Monte Carlo
1983	Cher... A Celebration at Caesars	Herself	
1987	Superstars and their Moms	Herself	
1990	Cher... at the Mirage	Herself	Also known as Cher Extravaganza: Live at the Mirage
1996	If These Walls Could Talk	Dr. Beth Thompson	Also director (segment "1996")
1998	Sonny & Me: Cher Remembers	Herself	Also executive producer
1999	VH1 Divas Live 2	Herself	
1999	Cher: Live in Concert	Herself	
2000	Will & Grace	Herself	Episode: "Gypsies, Tramps and Weed"
2002	VH1 Divas Las Vegas	Herself	
2002	Will & Grace	Herself	Episode: "A.I.: Artificial Insemination"
2003	Cher: The Farewell Tour	Herself	Also executive producer
2004	Sesame Street	Herself	Episode: "Cookie Monster Writes a Story"
2011	Becoming Chaz	Herself	
2011	TCM Guest Programmer	Herself (co-host)	Episode: "September 7, 2011"
2013	TCM Friday Night Spotlight	Herself (co-host)	Four-episode subset themed "A Woman's World: The Defining Era of Women in Films"
2013	Dear Mom, Love Cher	Herself	Also executive producer
2013	The Voice	Herself (special advisor)	Season 5
2013	Dancing with the Stars	Herself (guest judge)	Season 17, episode 8: "Cher Week"
2017	Home: Adventures with Tip & Oh	Chercophonie (voice)	Episode: "Chercophonie"
2021	Cher at the BBC	Herself	A collection of Cher's biggest hits performed at the BBC
2021	Cher & the Loneliest Elephant	Herself	Also executive producer
2021	Scooby-Doo and Guess Who?	Herself (voice)	Episode: "Cher, Scooby, and the Sargasso Sea!"
2023	Carol Burnett: 90 Years of Laughter + Love	Herself	

== Video games ==
Year	Title	Role	Notes
1996	9: The Last Resort	Isadora	Voice

== Commercials ==
Year	Company	Promoting	#	Theme	Soundtrack	Country
1984	Chicago Health & Racquetball Club	Gym Club	1	Cher working out	Instrumental song	United States
1985; 1989	Jack LaLanne Spa	Gym Club	3	Cher working out	"If I Could Turn Back Time"	United States/Europe
1987; 1988	Parfums Stern	Uninhibited	2	Beach and catwalk	Instrumental song	United States
1992	Equal	Sweetener	1	Cher talking about Equal	No song	United States
1992	Aquasentials Skin Care	Beauty line by Cher	1	Cher talking about Aquasentials	No song	United States
1995	Warner Music Group	It's a Man's World	1	Cher singing	"One by One" "Walking In Memphis"	United States/Europe
2013	Warner Music Group	Closer to the Truth	2	Cher singing	"Woman's World" "I Hope You Find It"	United States/Europe
2024	UKTV	U (streaming service)	1	Cher daydreaming, singing while in several UKTV programmes	"I Got You Babe"	United Kingdom
2025	Uber	Uber Eats	2	Cher accidentally time-travelling	"If I Could Turn Back Time"	Australia

== Other work ==
- CherFitness: A New Attitude (1991) – Fitness video
- CherFitness: Body Confidence (1992) – Fitness video
- 9: The Last Resort (1996) – Adventure computer game

== Film roles associated with Cher ==
Year	Title	Notes	Status
1967	Bonnie and Clyde	Warren Beatty was making a gangster film, and he wanted to test Cher for the part of Bonnie, but later was turned down because Beatty begged Natalie Wood, his girlfriend at the time, to play the role.	Faye Dunaway got the part
1975	The Fortune	When Bette Midler was dropped from the Nicholson-Beatty comedy, Cher auditioned for the role of "Fredrika" but was turned down by Mike Nichols. "There are two kinds of girls in the world: the kind you wanna fuck and the kind you don't." He felt the role called for the latter and for him, Cher wasn't "suitable." "But I'm talented," she yelled. "If you can't see it now, you'll be sorry one day." Nine years later, Nichols cast Cher as Dolly Pelliker in Silkwood.	Stockard Channing got the part
1976	King Kong	Cher auditioned for the part but was turned down. In an interview she said: "I did the test as a lark. I was pregnant at the time, or else I probably would have done it – just to work."	Jessica Lange got the part
1976	A Star is Born	Cher was attached to star before Jon Peters and Barbra Streisand took over.	replaced by Barbra Streisand
1979	The Fish That Saved Pittsburgh	Cher was originally cast as "Mona Mondieu", but she backed out at the last minute because she was unable to fit the shooting into her schedule.	replaced by Stockard Channing
1983	Going to the Chapel	Cher was supposed to star in the film to Paramount Pictures during the summer of 1983, until she reportedly nixed so many prospective directors that she and the studio came to a parting of the ways.	Film never made
1983	Road Show	Cher was supposed to have been Jack Nicholson's leading lady in the film, until Nicholson objected to her casting.	Film never made
1984	Grandview, U.S.A.	Cher was offered the role of "Michelle 'Mike' Cody" but she turned down the role in favor of the film Mask. She turned down the role because producers wouldn't cast Eric Stolz as her co-star. About the role she said "I won't do anything for just money, only if I can bring something to it."	replaced by Jamie Lee Curtis
1984	Crimes of Passion	Cher was reportedly considered for the dual role of "Joanna Crane", aka the hooker "China Blue" in Ken Russell's romantic thriller.	Kathleen Turner got the part
1986	Fatal Beauty	During the first controversial interview with David Letterman, Cher confirmed that she was working on two films, Suspect and Fatal Beauty, but backed out of the latter.	replaced by Whoopi Goldberg
1987	Black Widow	Cher was reportedly considered for the lead role, but was later turned down. In an interview she said, "For me, it's about life experiences. Making films and... growth in life is real intertwined."	replaced by Theresa Russell
1987	Baby Boom	Cher turned down the female lead in the film Baby Boom. Cher said also that Diane Keaton was much better for the role.	replaced by Diane Keaton
1988	Midnight Run	Production executives suggested that the Mardukas character be changed to a woman and wanted Cher for the role in the hope she would provide some "sexual overtones". But Cher said that "I have to find a character to express who I am – and that's not easy."	Charles Grodin got the part
1988	Working Girl	Cher was considered for the role of "Tess McGill". She also said, "I act really great but I don't think of myself as an actress. I don't do it for a living."	Melanie Griffith got the part
1989	The War of the Roses	Cher was originally offered the role that eventually went to Kathleen Turner. Cher did not accept the role for personal reasons: "I knew that was going to be a hit. A great script but... kinda mean. I'd lived it for real. I didn't want to do it for money."	Kathleen Turner got the part
1989	She-Devil	After winning the Oscar, she spent three years choosing her next film and She-Devil was the one she most wanted.	Meryl Streep got the part
1990	The Witches	Cher was considered for the role of the "Grand High Witch" in a film adaptation of Roald Dahl's novel The Witches, but the role was eventually given to Anjelica Huston.	Anjelica Huston got the part
1990	The Grifters	For the role of Lilly, Cher was originally considered but she became too expensive after the success of Moonstruck for UK director Stephen Frears and his producer Martin Scorsese.	Anjelica Huston got the part
1991	Thelma & Louise	Cher was offered for the role of "Thelma Yvonne Dickinson", but turned it down. In an interview Cher also said "It was a much rougher when I got it. It probably would've been a good movie to do. Sometimes you win and sometimes you lose. I'm glad Susan did it."	Geena Davis got the part
1991	The Addams Family	Cher was considered for the role of "Morticia Addams".	Anjelica Huston got the part
1992	Batman Returns	Cher was in competition with many other actresses for the role of "Catwoman".	Michelle Pfeiffer got the part
1992	Leaving Normal	Backed away from director Edward Zwick's second feature (a kind of Thelma & Louise revisited) as the waitress was a cousin of her role in Come Back to the Five and Dime, Jimmy Dean, Jimmy Dean. Besides, she was busy with her Aquasentials Skin Care infomercials.	Christine Lahti got the part
1992	This Is My Life	Fox wanted the Jewish housewife struggling to be a stand-up comic to be Cher, Bette Midler or Michelle Pfeiffer.	Julie Kavner got the part
1993	Title unknown	In 1993, Cher and Michelle Pfeiffer had a film in development, a black comedy about a film star and a tabloid reporter, but the film never appeared.	Project abandoned
1994	Interview with the Vampire	Due to Hollywood's homophobia of the time, Anne Rice rewrote the part of Louis, changing his sex to female, specifically to make Louis' and Lestat's relationship heterosexual. At the time, Rice felt it was the only way to get the film made, and Cher was considered for the part.	Brad Pitt got the part
1995	The Bridges of Madison County	Cher was considered for the role of "Francesca Johnson".	Meryl Streep got the part
1996	Evita	Cher was proposed to play "Eva Peron" in the movie musical.	Madonna got the part
1996	Freaky Deaky	In early 1996 Barry Cooper with Monte Hellman made a deal with the Japanese company Shochiku. Part of the deal was that Quentin Tarantino and Lawrence Bender would be executive producers of the pictures that Hellman would direct. One of the film was Freaky Deaky, an adaption of Elmore Leonard's 1988 novel. The cast for the film included Vince Vaughn (as Chris), Cher (as Robin) and Mickey Rourke (as Skip), but due to conflicts the company and the producers team the film never appeared.	Project abandoned
2000	Mame	ABC in late 2000 confirmed that Cher would star in a TV adaptation of the musical Mame.	Film never made
2001	Riding in Cars with Boys	When the rights were purchased in 1989 by James L. Brooks, Debra Winger and Cher were considered for the lead.	replaced by Drew Barrymore
2001	Heartbreakers	Originally, Doug Liman was set to direct, with Cher and Jennifer Aniston playing the roles of "Max" and "Page", a film called The Breakers. However, due to the long pre-production stage, both actresses had to bow out of the film due to scheduling conflicts.	replaced by Sigourney Weaver
2001	The Enchanted Cottage	Since 1992 Cher had plans to direct and star in a remake of the 1945 John Cromwell film, and in 2001 was announced that she was hoping to play opposite Brendan Fraser, but the film never happened.	Film never made
2003	In The Pink	In December 2003, during an interview Cher announced that was offered a role in a film called In The Pink. Cher was set to star with Britney Spears, Bette Midler, comic Wanda Sykes and Tim Allen as director. The film was written by Simon Beaufoy, who wrote also The Full Monty, for Revolution Studios. The comedy features Allen playing a Texas playboy wealthy exec who loses his job and is forced to sell Mary Kay cosmetics door to door with a group of women. The film was also to start shooting in early 2005, but in March 2005 Midler said that the film had not been put into development.	Film never made
2008	The Dark Knight Rises	In the summer of 2008 was reported that Cher was set to play Catwoman opposite Christian Bale in the third Batman film from British director Christopher Nolan. A studio executive said also that "Cher is Nolan's first choice to play Catwoman. He wants her to portray her like a vamp in her twilight years." and "The new Catwoman will be the absolute opposite of Michelle Pfeiffer and Halle Berry's purring creations." Those rumors were denied on November 3, 2008, when Cher appeared on The Ellen DeGeneres Show.	Rumours denied
2008	Mamma Mia!	In a 2010 red carpet interview at the premiere of Burlesque that she had been offered a part in Mamma Mia! alongside her Silkwood co-star Meryl Streep, but was on the road so could not commit. Eventually, she was cast in its sequel, Mamma Mia! Here We Go Again.	Could not commit
2008–11	The Drop Out	In a 2008 appearance on The Ellen DeGeneres Show, Cher told DeGeneres that she was to appear in a film with Johnny Knoxville. This did not materialise in 2010 as expected, but during a red carpet interview at the Burlesque premiere, Cher indicated that she and Knoxville were still keen to make the film.	Status unknown
