= 43rd Golden Globe Awards =

Film award ceremony in 1986

- Date: January 24, 1986
- Site: Beverly Hilton Hotel; Beverly Hills, Los Angeles, California
- Hosted by: Charlton Heston; Donna Mills

Highlights
- Best Film: Drama: Out of Africa
- Best Film: Musical or Comedy: Prizzi's Honor
- Best Drama Series: Murder, She Wrote
- Best Musical or Comedy Series: The Golden Girls
- Most awards: (4) Prizzi's Honor
- Most nominations: (6) Out of Africa; Prizzi's Honor; Witness

The 43rd Golden Globe Awards, honoring the best in film and television for 1985, were held on January 24, 1986.

== Winners and nominees ==
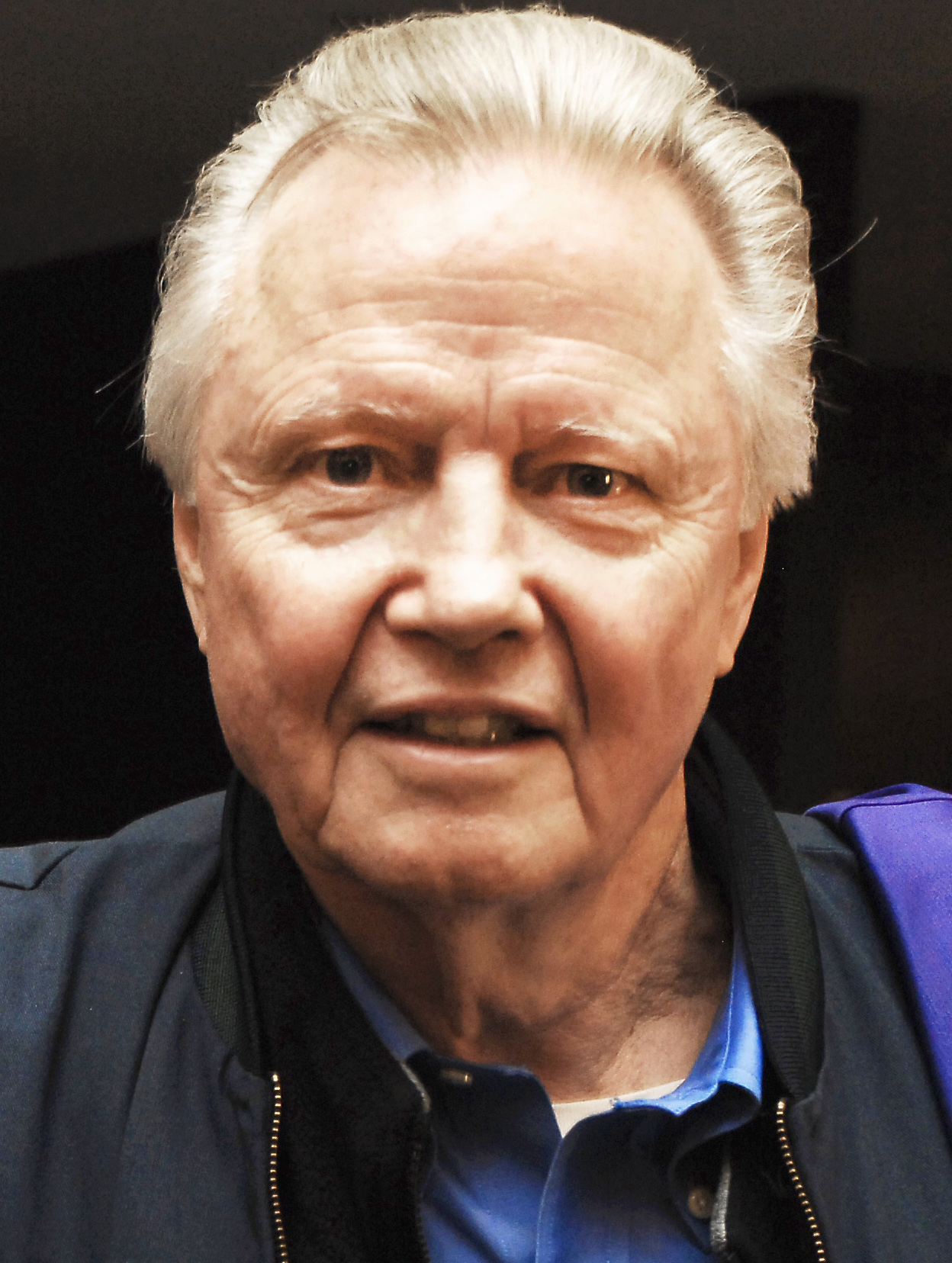
Jon Voight — Best Actor in a Motion Picture, Drama winner

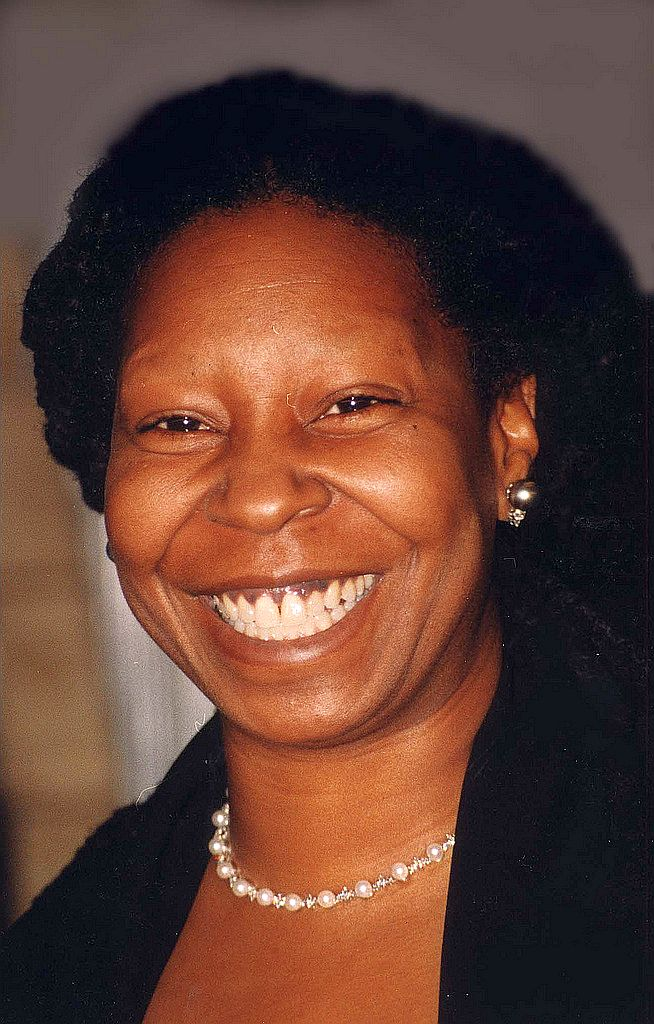
Whoopi Goldberg — Best Actress in a Motion Picture, Drama winner

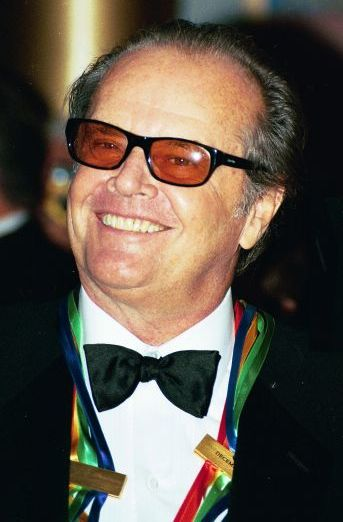
Jack Nicholson — Best Actor in a Motion Picture, Comedy or Musical winner

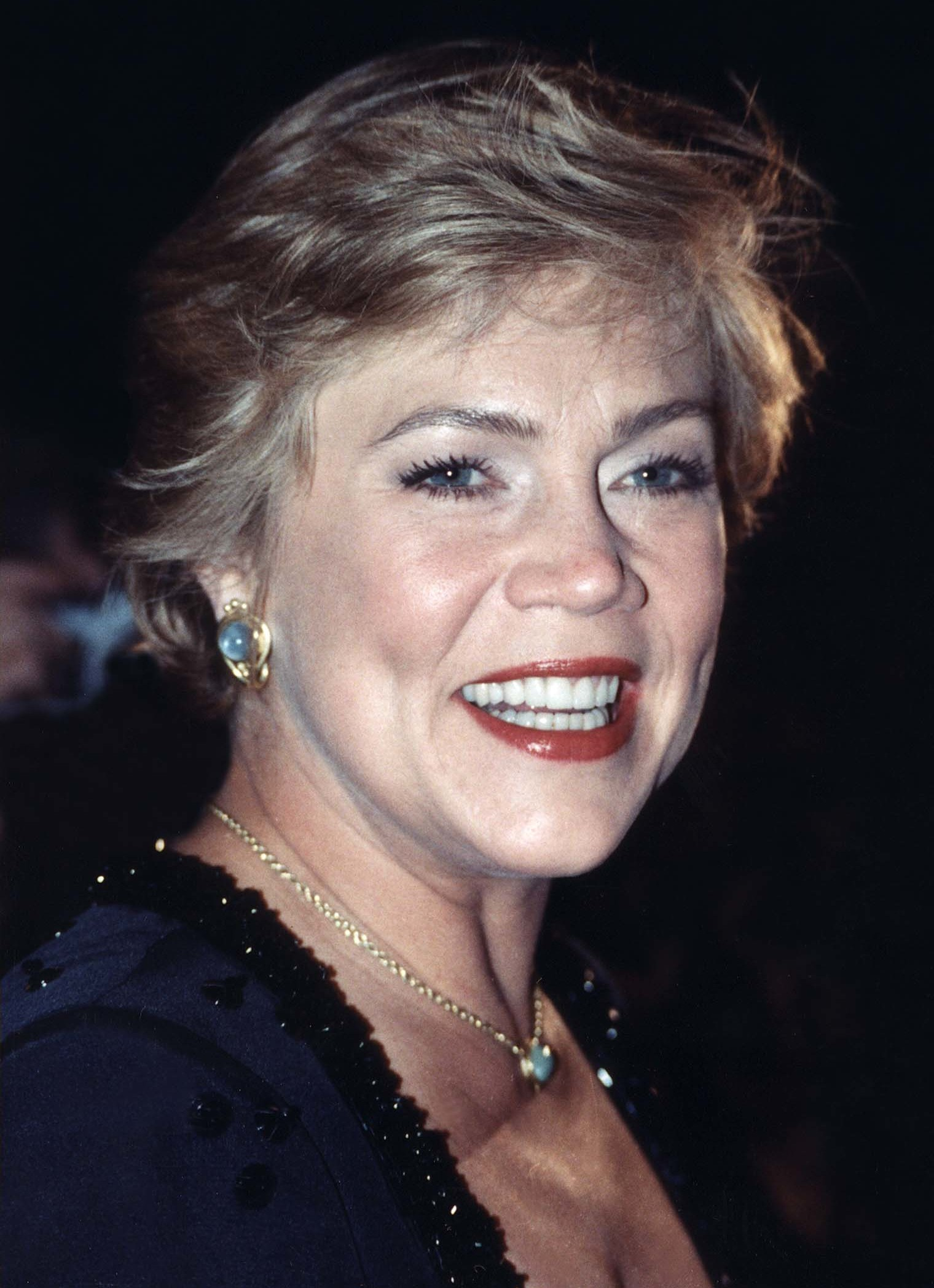
Kathleen Turner — Best Actress in a Motion Picture, Comedy or Musical winner

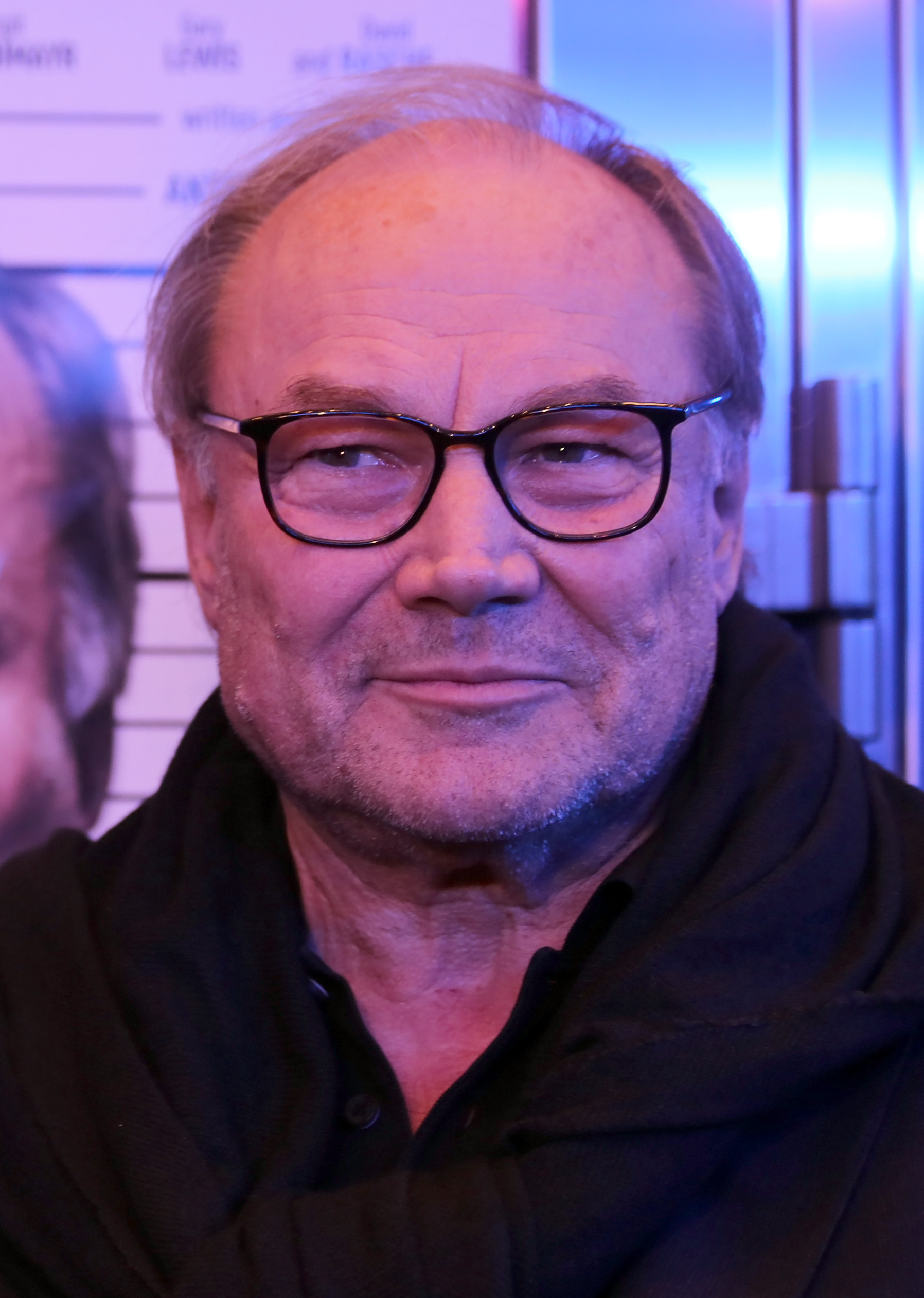
Klaus Maria Brandauer — Best Supporting Actor in a Motion Picture, winner

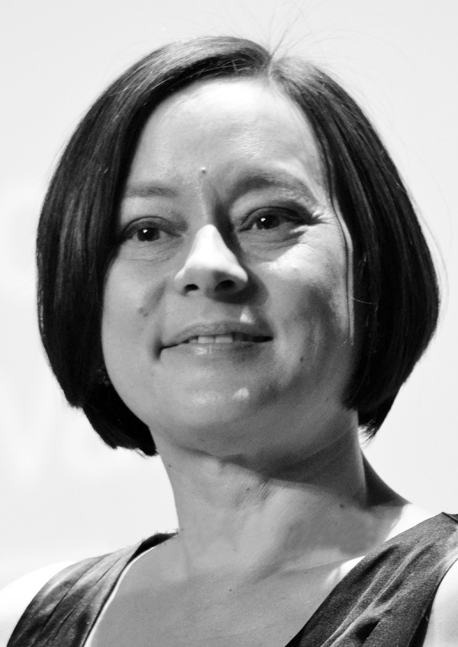
Meg Tilly — Best Supporting Actress in a Motion Picture, winner

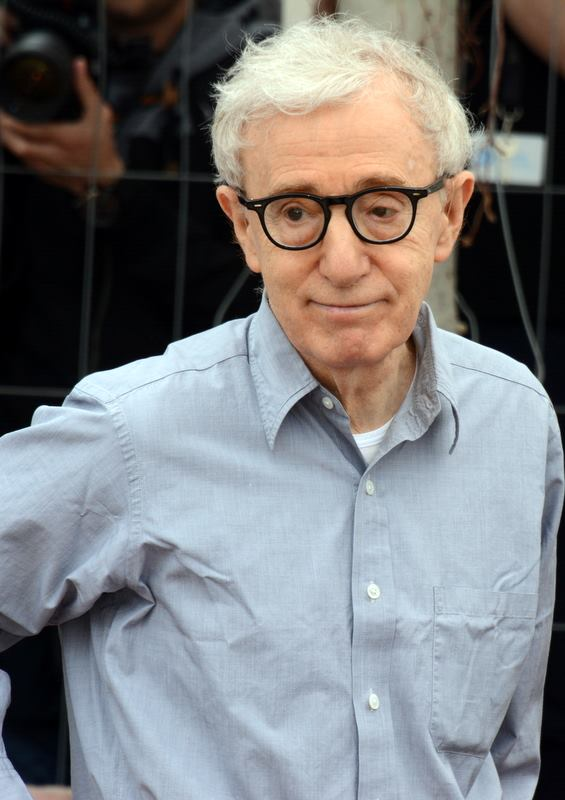
Woody Allen — Best Screenplay, winner

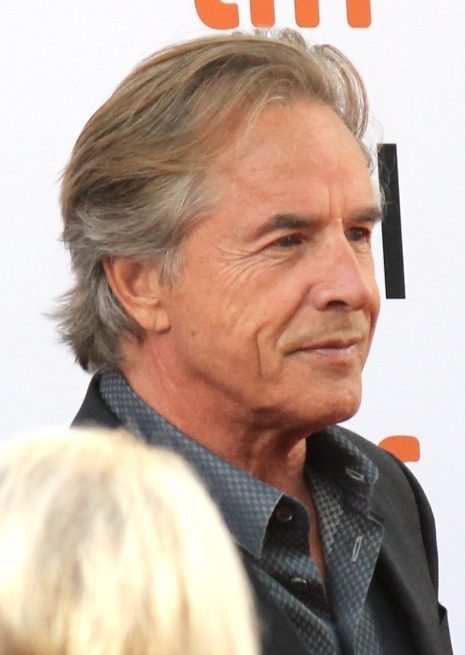
Don Johnson — Best Actor in a Television Series, Drama winner

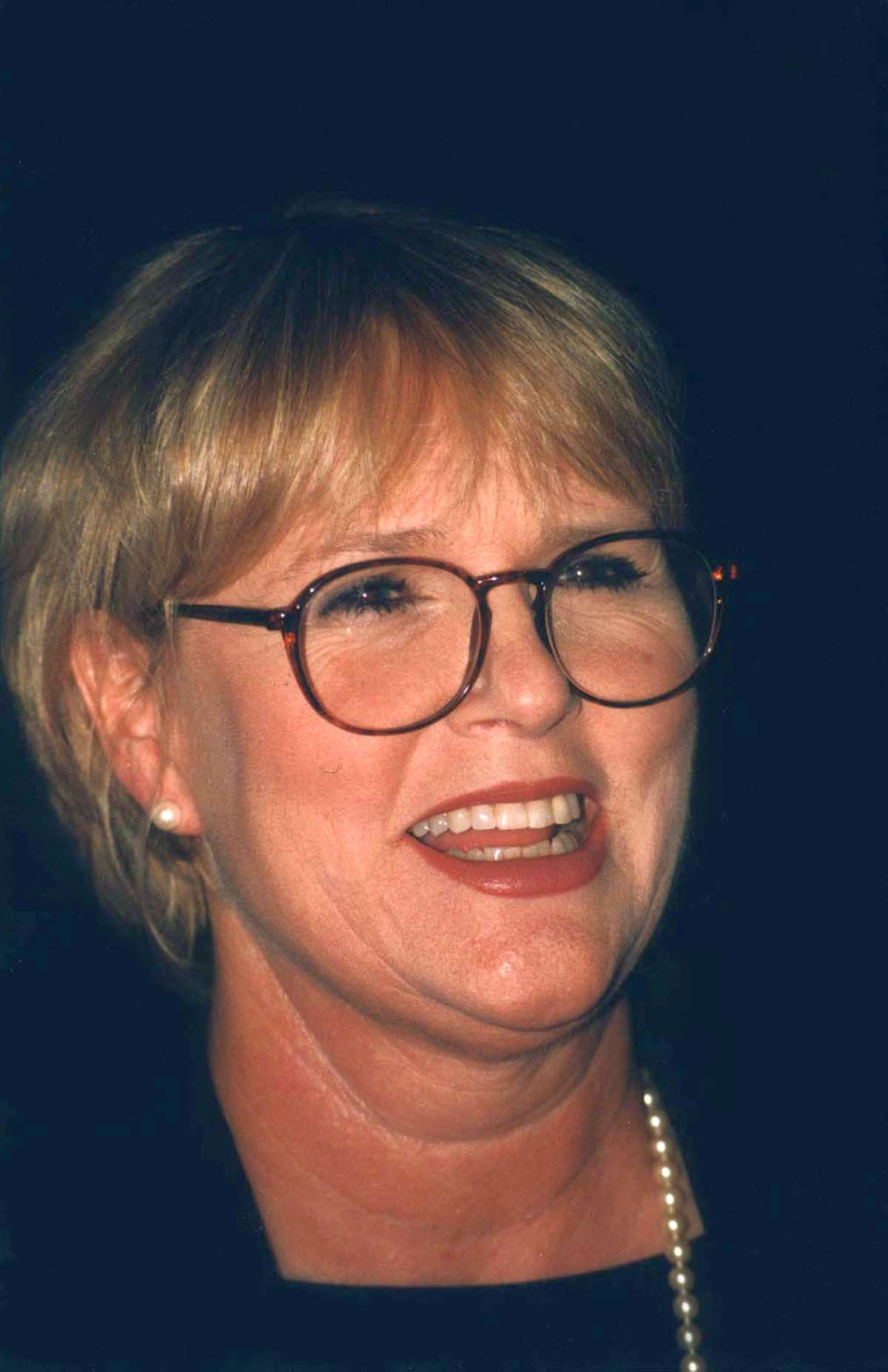
Sharon Gless — Best Actress in a Television Series, Drama winner

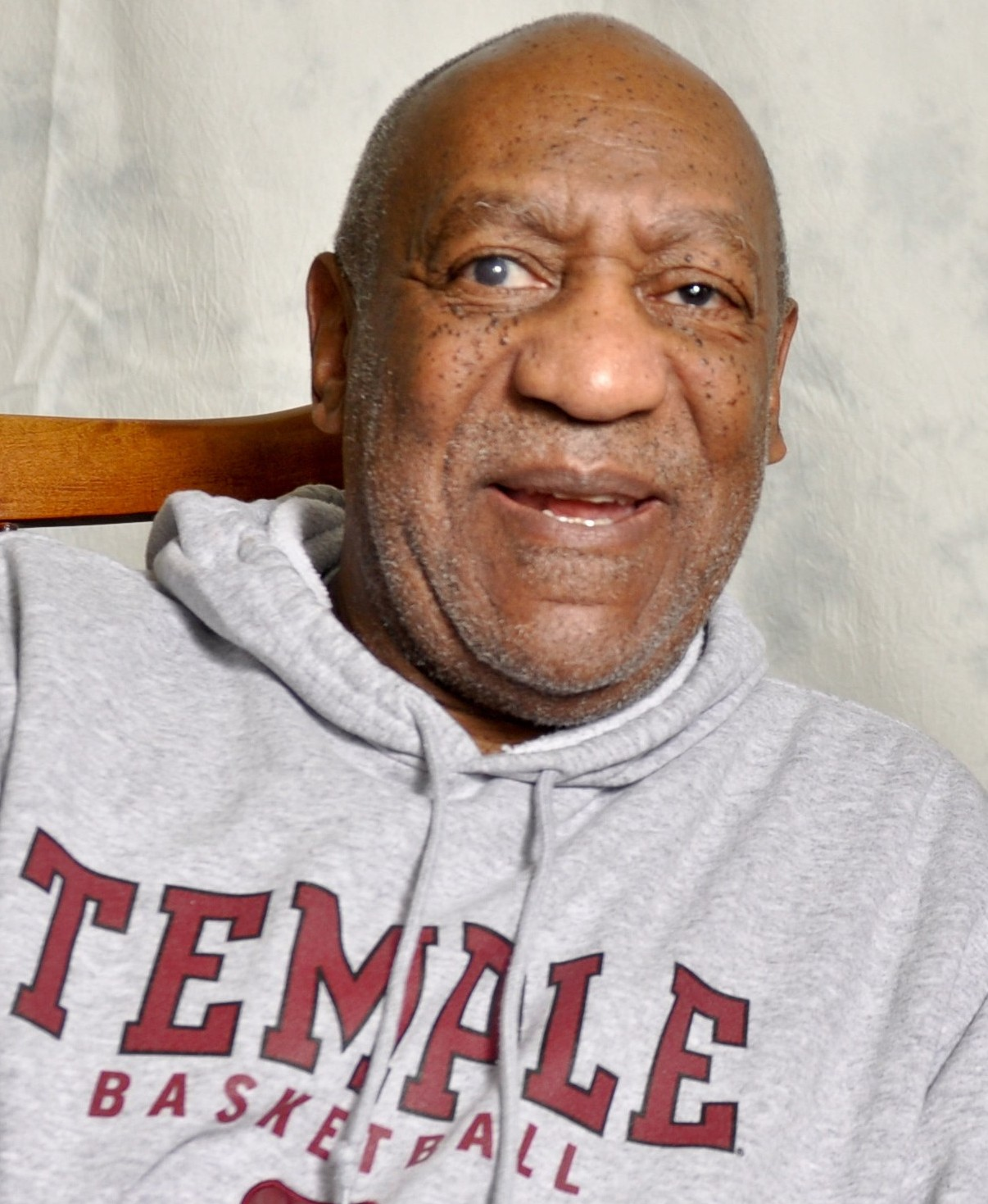
Bill Cosby — Best Actor in a Television Series, Comedy or Musical winner

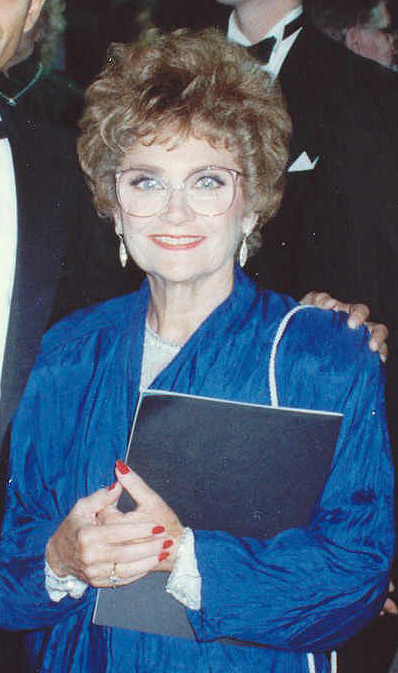
Estelle Getty — Best Actress in a Television Series, Comedy or Musical winner

Cybill Shepherd — Best Actress in a Television Series, Comedy or Musical winner

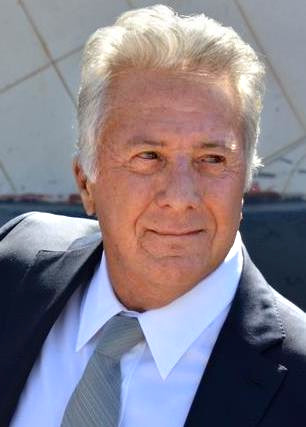
Dustin Hoffman — Best Actor in a Miniseries or Television Movie, winner

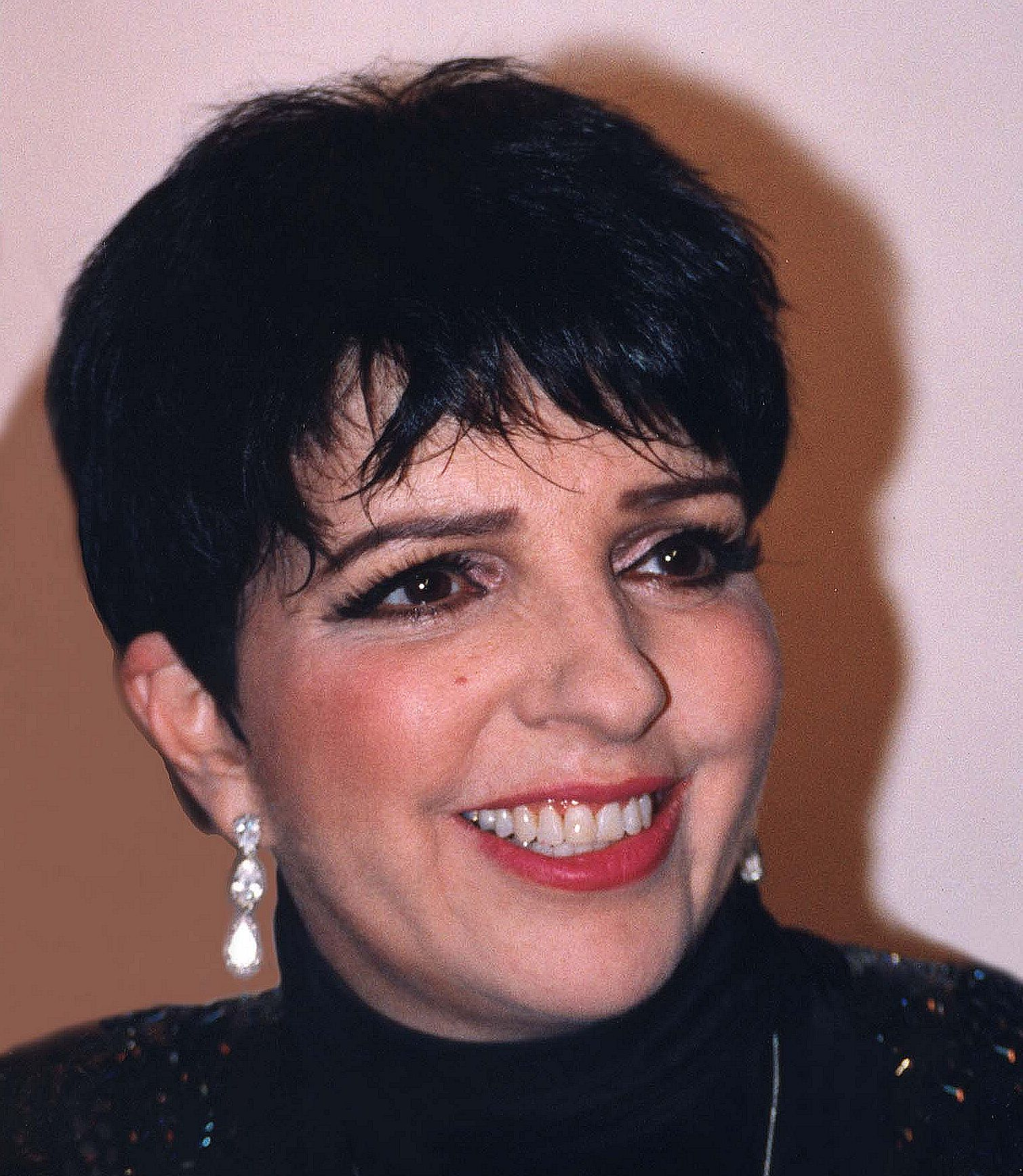
Liza Minnelli — Best Actress in a Miniseries or Television Movie, winner

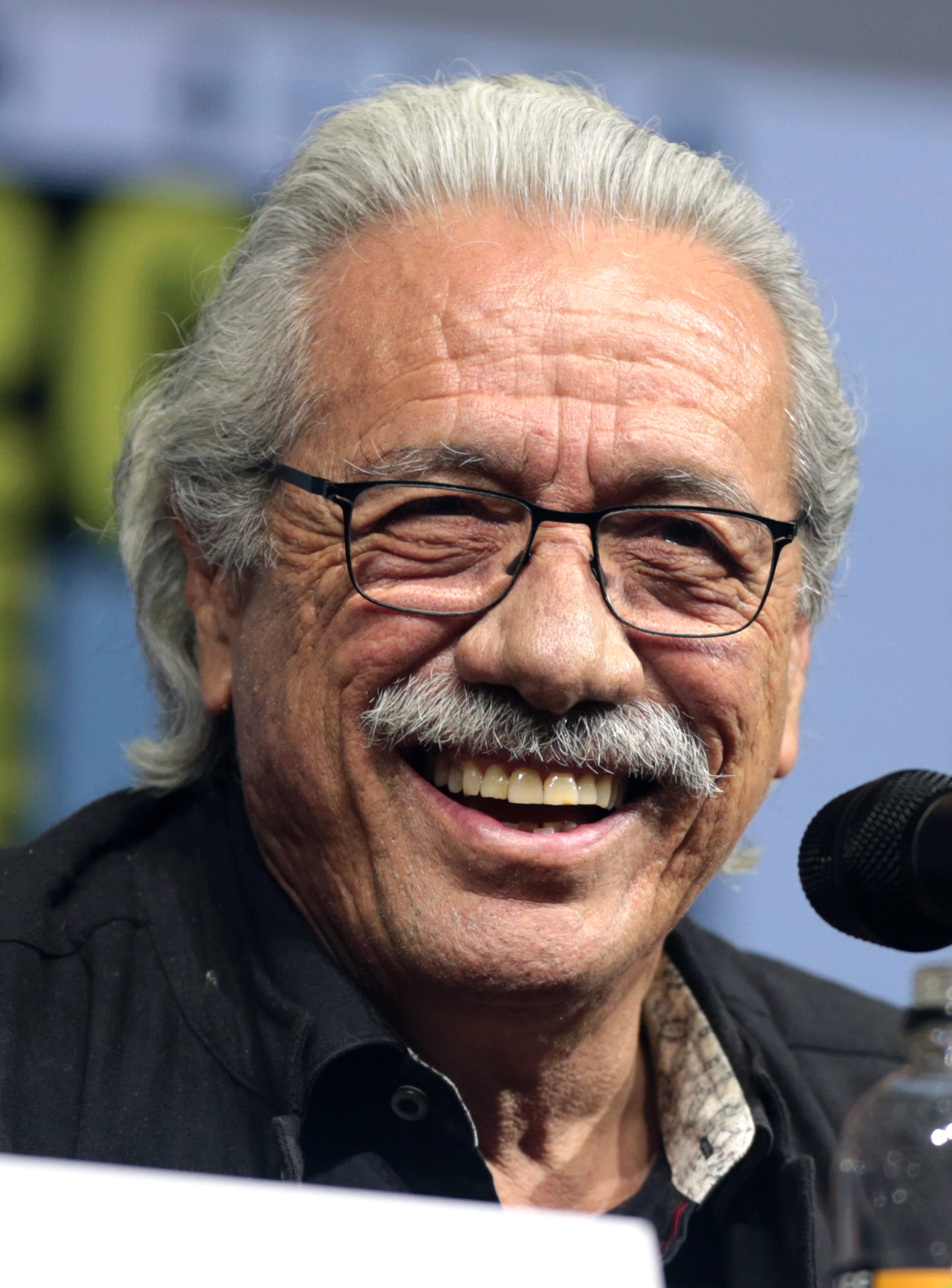
Edward James Olmos — Best Supporting Actor in a Series, Miniseries or Motion Picture Made for Television, winner

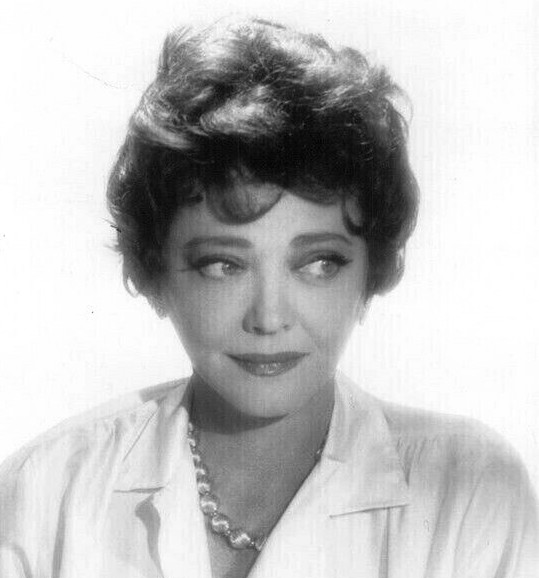
Sylvia Sidney — Best Supporting Actress in a Series, Miniseries or Motion Picture Made for Television, winner

=== Film ===
Best Motion Picture
Drama	Comedy or Musical
Out of Africa; The Color Purple; Kiss of the Spider Woman; Runaway Train; Witness	Prizzi's Honor; Back to the Future; A Chorus Line; Cocoon; The Purple Rose of Cairo
Best Performance in a Motion Picture – Drama
Actor	Actress
Jon Voight – Runaway Train as Oscar "Manny" Manheim; Harrison Ford – Witness as Detective Captain John Book; Gene Hackman – Twice in a Lifetime as Harry Mackenzie; William Hurt – Kiss of the Spider Woman as Luis Molina; Raúl Juliá – Kiss of the Spider Woman as Valentin Arregui	Whoopi Goldberg – The Color Purple as Celie Harris Johnson; Anne Bancroft – Agnes of God as Miriam Ruth; Cher – Mask as Florence "Rusty" Dennis; Geraldine Page – The Trip to Bountiful as Carrie Watts; Meryl Streep – Out of Africa as Karen Blixen
Best Performance in a Motion Picture – Comedy or Musical
Actor	Actress
Jack Nicholson – Prizzi's Honor as Charley Partanna; Jeff Daniels – The Purple Rose of Cairo as Tom Baxter/Gil Shepherd; Griffin Dunne – After Hours as Paul Hackatt; Michael J. Fox – Back to the Future as Marty McFly; James Garner – Murphy's Romance as Murphy Jones	Kathleen Turner – Prizzi's Honor as Irene Walker; Rosanna Arquette – Desperately Seeking Susan as Roberta Glass; Glenn Close – Maxie as Jan/Maxie; Mia Farrow – The Purple Rose of Cairo as Cecelia; Sally Field – Murphy's Romance as Emma Moriarty
Best Supporting Performance in a Motion Picture – Drama, Comedy or Musical
Supporting Actor	Supporting Actress
Klaus Maria Brandauer – Out of Africa as Baron Bror von Blixen-Finecke; Joel Grey – Remo Williams: The Adventure Begins as Chiun; John Lone – Year of the Dragon as Joey Tai; Eric Roberts – Runaway Train as Buck; Eric Stoltz – Mask as Roy L. "Rocky" Dennis	Meg Tilly - Agnes of God as Sister Agnes; Sônia Braga - Kiss of the Spider Woman as Leni Lamaison/Marta/Spider Woman; Anjelica Huston - Prizzi's Honor as Maerose Prizzi; Amy Madigan - Twice in a Lifetime as Sunny Sobel; Kelly McGillis - Witness as Rachel Lapp; Oprah Winfrey - The Color Purple as Sofia Johnson
Other
Best Director	Best Screenplay
John Huston – Prizzi's Honor; Richard Attenborough – A Chorus Line; Sydney Pollack – Out of Africa; Steven Spielberg – The Color Purple; Peter Weir – Witness	The Purple Rose of Cairo – Woody Allen; Back to the Future – Bob Gale and Robert Zemeckis; Out of Africa – Kurt Luedtke; Prizzi's Honor – Richard Condon and Janet Roach; Witness – William Kelley and Earl W. Wallace
Best Original Score	Best Original Song
Out of Africa – John Barry; The Color Purple – Quincy Jones; White Nights – Michel Colombier; Witness – Maurice Jarre; Year of the Dragon – David Mansfield	"Say You, Say Me" (Lionel Richie) – White Nights; "The Power of Love" (Huey Lewis and Chris Hayes) – Back to the Future; "Rhythm of the Night" (Diane Warren) – The Last Dragon; "A View to a Kill" (John Barry, Duran Duran and Bernard Edwards) – A View to a Kill; "We Don't Need Another Hero (Thunderdome)" (Terry Britten and Graham Lyle) – Mad Max Beyond Thunderdome
Best Foreign Language Film
The Official Story (La historia oficial) (Argentina); Colonel Redl (Oberst Redl) (Hungary); Ran (Japan); When Father Was Away on Business (Otac na sluzbenom putu) (Yugoslavia); The Year of the Quiet Sun (Rok spokojnego slonca) (Poland)

The following films received multiple nominations:

Nominations	Title
6	Out of Africa
6	Prizzi's Honor
6	Witness
5	The Color Purple
4	Kiss of the Spider Woman
4	The Purple Rose of Cairo
4	Back to the Future
3	Runaway Train
2	Agnes of God
2	A Chorus Line
2	Mask
2	Murphy's Romance
2	Twice in a Lifetime
2	White Nights
2	Year of the Dragon

The following films received multiple wins:

Wins	Title
4	Prizzi's Honor
3	Out of Africa

=== Television ===
Best Television Series
Drama	Comedy or Musical
Murder, She Wrote; Cagney & Lacey; Dynasty; Miami Vice; St. Elsewhere	The Golden Girls; The Cosby Show; Family Ties; Kate & Allie; Moonlighting
Best Performance in a Television Series – Drama
Actor	Actress
Don Johnson – Miami Vice as Sonny Crockett; John Forsythe – Dynasty as Blake Carrington; Tom Selleck – Magnum, P.I. as Thomas Magnum; Philip Michael Thomas – Miami Vice as Ricardo Tubbs; Daniel J. Travanti – Hill Street Blues as Captain Frank Furillo	Sharon Gless – Cagney & Lacey as Christine Cagney; Joan Collins – Dynasty as Alexis Carrington; Tyne Daly – Cagney & Lacey as Mary Beth Lacey; Linda Evans – Dynasty as Krystle Carrington; Angela Lansbury – Murder, She Wrote as Jessica Fletcher
Best Performance in a Television Series – Comedy or Musical
Actor	Actress
Bill Cosby – The Cosby Show as Cliff Huxtable; Tony Danza – Who's the Boss? as Tony Micelli; Michael J. Fox – Family Ties as Alex P. Keaton; Bob Newhart – Newhart as Dick Loudon; Bruce Willis – Moonlighting as David Addison	Estelle Getty – The Golden Girls as Sophia Petrillo; Cybill Shepherd – Moonlighting as Maddie Hayes; Beatrice Arthur – The Golden Girls as Dorothy Zbornak; Rue McClanahan – The Golden Girls as Blanche Devereaux; Betty White – The Golden Girls as Rose Nylund
Best Performance in a Miniseries or Television Film
Actor	Actress
Dustin Hoffman – Death of a Salesman as Willy Loman; Richard Chamberlain – Wallenberg: A Hero's Story as Raoul Wallenberg; Richard Crenna – The Rape of Richard Beck as Richard Beck; Kirk Douglas – Amos as Amos Lasher; Peter Strauss – Kane & Abel as Abel Rosnovski	Liza Minnelli – A Time to Live as Mary-Lou Weisman; Peggy Ashcroft – The Jewel in the Crown as Barbara Batchelor; Gena Rowlands – An Early Frost as Katherine Pierson; Marlo Thomas – Consenting Adult as Tess Lynd; Joanne Woodward – Do You Remember Love as Barbara Wyatt-Hollis
Best Supporting Performance - TV Series, Miniseries or Television Film
Supporting Actor	Supporting Actress
Edward James Olmos – Miami Vice as Lieutenant Martin Castillo; Ed Begley Jr. – St. Elsewhere as Dr. Victor Ehrlich; David Carradine – North and South as Justin LaMotte; Richard Farnsworth – Chase as Jude Grand Pettitt; John James – Dynasty as Jeff Colby; John Malkovich – Death of a Salesman as Biff Loman; Pat Morita – Amos as Tommy Tanaka; Bruce Weitz – Hill Street Blues as Sergeant Michael "Mick" Belker	Sylvia Sidney – An Early Frost as Beatrice McKenna; Lesley-Anne Down – North and South as Madeline Fabray; Katherine Helmond – Who's the Boss? as Mona Robinson; Kate Reid – Death of a Salesman as Linda Loman; Inga Swenson – Benson as Gretchen Kraus
Best Miniseries or Television Film
The Jewel in the Crown; Amos; Death of a Salesman; Do You Remember Love; An Early Frost

The following programs received multiple nominations:

Nominations	Title
5	The Golden Girls
5	Dynasty
4	Death of a Salesman
4	Miami Vice
3	Amos
3	Cagney & Lacey
3	An Early Frost
2	The Cosby Show
2	Do You Remember Love
2	Family Ties
2	Hill Street Blues
2	The Jewel in the Crown
2	Murder, She Wrote
2	North and South
2	St. Elsewhere
2	Moonlighting
2	Who's the Boss?

The following programs received multiple wins:

Wins	Title
2	The Golden Girls

== Ceremony ==
=== Presenters ===
- June Allyson
- Shari Belafonte
- Gary Busey
- Barbara Carrera
- Diahann Carroll
- Richard Chamberlain
- Natalie Cole
- Bette Davis
- William Devane
- Kirk Douglas
- Patty Duke
- Faye Dunaway
- Janie Fricke
- Louis Gossett, Jr.
- Raul Julia
- Gladys Knight
- Shelley Long
- Howie Mandel
- Kristy McNichol
- Julia Migenes
- Chuck Norris
- Jennifer O'Neill
- Lou Rawls
- Carl Reiner
- Cesar Romero
- Robert Stack
- Peter Strauss

== See also ==
- 58th Academy Awards
- 6th Golden Raspberry Awards
- 37th Primetime Emmy Awards
- 38th Primetime Emmy Awards
- 39th British Academy Film Awards
- 40th Tony Awards
- 1985 in film
- 1985 in American television
