= IVillage =

American media company (1995–2013)

iVillage
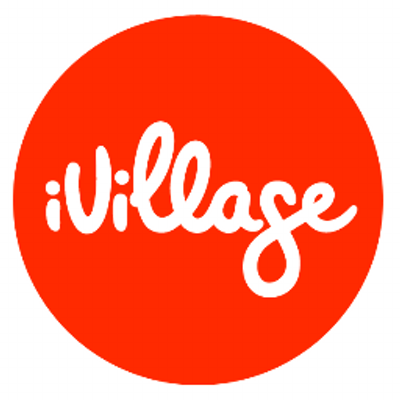
- Owners: NBCUniversal (Comcast)
- Creators: Nancy Evans; Candice Carpenter; Robert Levitan; Tina Sharkey
- Commercial: Yes
- Launched: 1995; 31 years ago
- Current status: Defunct

iVillage, Inc. was a mass media company that operated the "most popular female-oriented sites" on the internet in the 1990s. In addition to ivillage.com, the company operated iVillage UK, Astrology.com, GardenWeb, and the NBC Digital Health Network. The iVillage website ceased operations on October 31, 2014, and the domain name was redirected to the Today Show website, while the other domain names were sold.

== History ==
The company was established in Silicon Alley in New York City in 1995 by Candice Carpenter, Nancy Evans, and Robert Levitan. The company's first content site was "Parent Soup", an online community channel on America Online. The company soon established other communities such as "AboutWork", "Better Health & Medical", and "Life Soup".

iVillage hosted moderated message boards and chatrooms, and on Parent Soup alone hosted 450 scheduled chat sessions per week. Examples of chat rooms on the Relationships site included: "Dating Dilemmas, Couples Clinic, How to Kiss Better, The Wedding Women, Ms. Demeanor and a chat session for the Ex-Wives Club."

When iVillage launched, it demanded high prices for channel and content area sponsorships, and the first four sponsors were Polaroid, Nissan, Toyota and MGM. iVillage pioneered a new model for online advertising where it worked with advertisers to create custom content that was relevant and useful for the community. When Procter & Gamble Co. began advertising on the Web in 1996, it relented on its notorious demands for pay-per-click pricing deals in order to advertise with iVillage's Parent Soup.

In March 1999, the company became a public company via an initial public offering, offering shares at $24 each. The stock price reached to nearly $100 in the first day of trading and reached over $130 per share within days, valuing the company at over $2 billion. However, by December 2000, after the bursting of the dot-com bubble, the stock price was under $1 per share.

Most of the original management and staff left the company. Controversies had arisen over financing irregularities and company management, and the company had never had a profitable quarter.

In 2001, under new management, the company acquired women.com for $47 million.

In May 2006, NBCUniversal acquired iVillage for $600 million, or $8.50 per share.

In July 2008, the company entered into a partnership with BlogHer, an online news, entertainment and information network for women.

In December 2009, the company relaunched Astrology.com.

The site was shut down and redirected to the website of Today.com in 2013.

In 2015, Astrology.com was acquired by Horoscope.com and GardenWeb.com was acquired by Houzz.

== Television show ==
iVillage Live (later In the Loop with iVillage) was a daily series intended for broadcast syndication which served as a brand extension attempt to extend the iVillage brand to television. The series never extended beyond the 9 NBC Owned Television Stations, and went through two different iterations before ending after 15 months, airing between December 4, 2006, and March 28, 2008.

The first iteration of the series originated from Universal Orlando Resort as one of NBC's first major on-air synergy efforts with the recently acquired Universal Studios. WTVJ/Miami held production responsibilities for the series, which was hosted by a group of relatively unknown hosts, including Molly Pesce, Stefani Schaeffer and Guy Yovan, with Naamua Delaney and Bob Oschack as contributing correspondents. The show also aired on a one-day delay on Bravo when it launched, but the repeats ended on Bravo after 3 weeks.

The first season format was deemed unsuccessful, but NBC continued to see potential in an iVillage series, along with the aspect of using former contestants from the Donald Trump-hosted reality television series The Apprentice to boost the show's profile for possible nationwide syndication in the 2008–09 season. On September 4, 2007, NBC Universal Television and iVillage.com announced the relaunch of IVillage Live as In the Loop with iVillage, referencing the Chicago Loop. Premiering on September 17, it originated from Chicago, being filmed from the NBC Tower and being originated by Chicago NBC O&O WMAQ-TV. Hosts for In the Loop included actress Kim Coles, along with the aforementioned Apprentice alums, including first season winner Bill Rancic and fellow contestant Ereka Vetrini.

In the end, In the Loop was unable to maintain any ratings momentum, and was unable to complete the 2007-08 television season or acquire distribution on stations outside NBC (and by its end, its connections with iVillage were limited to polls and discussion forums). On February 18, 2008, the series was cancelled. Production of the series continued until March 21, followed by a week of rebroadcasts; the final original episode was re-aired on March 28.
