= Anna Hamilton Phelan =

American screenwriter

Anna Hamilton Phelan is an American screenwriter. She was nominated for two Writers Guild of America Awards for the films Mask (1985) and Gorillas in the Mist (1988), the latter of which also earned her an Academy Award nomination.

== Life ==
Phelan grew up in central Pennsylvania. She studied theater arts at Emerson College in Boston until 1965. Phelan left Boston after her studies and moved to New York City to pursue a career as a theatre actress. There she started to write her own monologues.

After a few years in New York, Phelan moved to Los Angeles, where she worked as an actress in TV productions. She took a serious turn to scriptwriting when she "was in a television film as a dance hall girl and the producer recast her as the madam." Phelan later combined her written monologues with feminist texts and toured with her solo show Corsages and Ketchup in the early 1970s. Afterwards she married and became a mother of two kids.

During her training at Harbor General Hospital she met Roy L. Dennis (1961–1978) and later his mother Florence Tullis, and convinced her to write a script about her son's story. Phelan attended two workshops of screenwriter Syd Field and during the second workshop she wrote the first draft of Mask, which was made into a feature film in 1985 by Peter Bogdanovich.

She then was approached by the head of Universal Pictures at the time, Frank Price, who asked her to write the screenplay for Gorillas in the Mist.

After that, she specialized her work as a scriptwriter on "women's parts, experience, and preference." She has been known to go through extensive research prior to writing her films and roles. Before writing Into the Homeland, a film about a group of neo-Nazis who kidnap the daughter of an ex-cop, Phalan spent time at the headquarters of a far right organization in order to gain more knowledge of the roles she was writing.

== Themes ==
She is known for writing strong women's roles, such as Cher's role in Mask (1985), as a caring and supportive mother towards her son who has a skull deformity, and Sigourney Weaver's part in Gorillas in the Mist (1988), who devotes her life to the study of primates and a strong fighter against illegal poaching in the African jungle. After Gorillas in the Mist, Sigourney Weaver told her "if you and other writers stop writing about female characters, then our daughters and granddaughters will have no female images on the screen to identify with at all" and Phelan took that as a responsibility of hers to keep creating positive roles for women on screen.

== Filmography ==
=== Writer ===
- Mask (1985)
- Into the Homeland (1987)
- Gorillas in the Mist (1988)
- In Love and War (1996)
- Girl, Interrupted (1999)
- Amelia (2009)

=== Actress ===
- Mask (1985)

== Awards and nominations ==
Year	Award	Category	Nominated work	Result
1986	38th Writers Guild of America Awards	Best Screenplay Written Directly for the Screen	Mask	Nominated
1989	61st Academy Awards	Best Writing, Screenplay Based on Material from Another Medium	Gorillas in the Mist	Nominated
1989	41st Writers Guild of America Awards	Best Screenplay Based on Material from Another Medium	Gorillas in the Mist	Nominated
