= Forever Fit =

1991 book by Cher and Robert Haas

- Authors: Cher, Robert Haas
- Language: English
- Subjects: Fitness, wellness, dieting, exercise
- Publisher: Bantam Books
- Publication date: January 26, 1991
- Publication place: United States
- Media type: Print (Hardcover)
- Pages: 342
- ISBN: 9780553070736
- OCLC: 22733887

Forever Fit: The Lifetime Plan for Health, Fitness, and Beauty is a health and lifestyle book co-authored by American entertainer Cher and sports nutritionist Robert Haas. It was released on January 26, 1991, by Bantam Books.

== Background and contents ==
Forever Fit focuses on nutrition, exercise and beauty, with the stated goal of promoting long-term health. The book originated from Cher's interest in improving her own habits following fatigue from touring and dietary imbalances. She collaborated with sports nutritionist Robert Haas—known for his work with athletes such as Martina Navratilova and Ivan Lendl—to develop a practical guide based on her experience. Haas contributed the technical and scientific aspects of the book, while Cher provided autobiographical context and personal perspectives. The book was marketed as a resource for individuals seeking to make sustainable health changes. Cher commented:

The point is not to focus on muscle groups or obsess about specific kinds of foods to deny yourself. It's to create a new attitude about health and fitness and about ... your physical and spiritual selves, working harmoniously, improving together.

The content is divided into three primary areas: diet, fitness and beauty. The nutritional section includes more than 75 recipes and features food composition charts, including data on fast food items. These are intended to inform readers about calorie, fat and sodium content. The book also provides a simplified explanation of cholesterol levels and their significance. The fitness portion outlines general workout principles but avoids prescribing specific routines, instead recommending external exercise videos—such as CherFitness: A New Attitude, released later that year, and CherFitness: Body Confidence (1992). The beauty section is interwoven with commentary from Cher, who discusses her approach to maintaining appearance and emphasizes discipline over genetics. While promoting the book, Cher described it as "kind of a self-help manual".

== Release and reception ==
In a positive review, Susan Thomson of the Surrey Now-Leader wrote, "This book is not just another star's tell-all about how to look as good as them. It's actually several books in one: a guide to effective exercise, a cookbook, a sensible weight-loss ... plan, and a manual of interesting beauty tips, all geared for today's busy woman." Lissa Larkin of the Asbury Park Press praised the book as "educational [and] an upbeat journey to health." The Item praised Cher and Haas' candid approach to health questions and highlighted Cher's personal involvement, including her evaluations of workout videos. The book was presented as an inspirational resource emphasizing that fitness is achievable at any age.

The New York Daily News published a skeptical review by Sheila Anne Feeney, who questioned Cher's credibility as a fitness expert due to her history with cosmetic procedures. Feeney described the book as a commercially-driven mix of celebrity anecdotes, product endorsements, beauty advice and fitness tips, highlighting Cher's selective acknowledgment of plastic surgeries and branding the work a "functional free-for-all of plugs." Forever Fit reached number six on Florida Today's non-fiction bestseller list.
