= Leontiasis ossea =

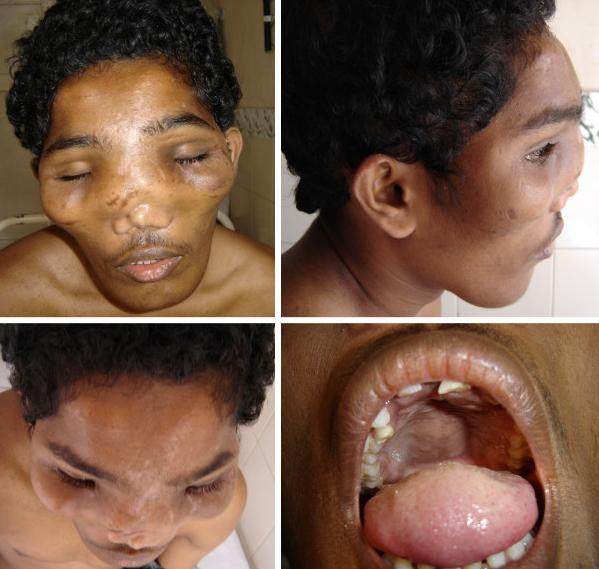
- A 25-year-old man with leontiasis ossea as a complication of polyostotic fibrous dysplasia

Leontiasis ossea, also known as leontiasis, lion face, or lion face syndrome, is a rare medical condition, characterized by an overgrowth of the facial and cranial bones. It is not a disease in itself, but a symptom of other diseases, including Paget's disease, fibrous dysplasia, hyperparathyroidism, and renal osteodystrophy.

The common form is that in which one or other maxilla is affected, its size progressively increasing, and thus encroaching on the cavities of the orbit, the mouth, the nose and its accessory sinuses. Exophthalmos gradually develops, going on later to a complete loss of sight due to compression of the optic nerve by the overgrowth of bone. There may also be interference with the nasal respiration and with the taking of food. In the somewhat less common form of this rare disease the overgrowth of bone affects all the cranial bones as well as those of the face, the senses being lost one by one and death finally resulting from cerebral pressure. There is no treatment other than exposing the overgrown bone, and chipping away pieces, or excising entirely where possible.

== Great Sphinx ==
Surgeon Hutan Ashrafian from Imperial College London has analysed the Great Sphinx to identify that it may have represented an individual suffering from prognathism which may have been a reflection of a disease suffered by the sculpture's human inspiration. Furthermore, as the Sphinx represented a lion, the same person may have suffered from leontiasis ossea.

== See also ==
- Lionitis
