= Camp Bloomfield =

Former campground in Santa Monica Mountains, California

- Interactive map of Camp Bloomfield
- Location: Malibu, California, U.S.
- Coordinates: 34.075448°N 118.925178°W
- Opened: 1958
- Owner: Wayfinder Family Services
- Slogan: Wayfinder's Camp Bloomfield provides children and youth who are blind, visually impaired or multi-disabled with a natural and safe environment to develop self-esteem, build independence and fully experience the joys of the great outdoors.
- Operating season: Summer sessions June - August, other activities offered year-round
- Website: www.wayfinderfamily.org

Camp Bloomfield was a 45-acre (180,000 m^{2}) campground in the Santa Monica Mountains near Malibu, California, United States. In 1958, Henry Bloomfield purchased the land, donating its use to the Foundation for the Junior Blind (now known as Wayfinder Family Services) to create a camp for children and youth who are blind, visually impaired or multi-disabled. As the largest of its kind in Western United States, Camp Bloomfield served hundreds of campers and family members free of charge each summer and was accredited by the American Camping Association (ACA). It was destroyed in the Woolsey fire on November 9, 2018.

== Activities ==
Several activities were available to both camper and their family members, such as:

- Archery
- Beach Trips
- Campfire Skits and Activities
- Fishing
- Group Discussions for Learning
- High Ropes Course
- Hiking
- Horseback Riding
- Interaction with Animal Life (formerly Nature)
- Learning to Care for Self and Others
- Learning About Responsibility and Leadership
- Overnight Camping in Teepees
- Playground activities
- Swimming

Some other activities that were taken out of the program that used to be conducted on the grounds include riflery, jazzercise, photography, diving, singing, arts & crafts and outdoor cooking.

== Camp Directors ==
- Norm Kaplan, Founder, 1958 - 1985
- Mark Lucas

== History ==
Camp Bloomfield was started in 1958 by Norm Kaplan with help from the Seabees and students at Pepperdine University. Starting off with a simple campfire circle, tents were later introduced in the first couple years. Cabins were put in place by 1962, four for Boy's Town and four for Girl's Town. Shortly after the construction of the cabins, the camp offices and mess hall, called Hanky's Hall, were built, allowing the camp to expand officially. In 1974, visually impaired, hearing impaired and deaf students were introduced to the Camp, where they mingled together. A song was chosen for this moment: Debbie Boone's "You Light Up My Life." Visually impaired students were taught sign language to use as a form of communication, where in one instance they signed the lyrics of the song to the deaf/hearing impaired students. Campers were able to experience various different cultures, reflected by the diversity of staff members, consisting of many young people coming from around the world to serve as counselors and specialists as per the founders request.

In 1984 camp scenes for Mask, were filmed here. Campers and staff got a preview of the finished film at Universal Studios in February, 1985.

Initially, there were four summer sessions conducted in camp:

- SPED, for Special Education kids (kids with multiple handicaps and learning disabilities that came with blindness). This session lasted a week.
- Tigers, for kids in elementary school. This session lasted two weeks.
- Juniors, for kids in Junior High school. This session lasted three weeks.
- Seniors, for teens in High school and college. This session lasted three weeks. Those who could, and who wanted to, could join the Summer Work Experience Program and work offsite doing office work during the day, and return to Camp at night.

After the 1980s the camp schedule was changed to include more sessions, and the sessions were reduced to three or four days apiece. Sessions were added for families and for campers who wanted to bring their sighted buddies, and split so that people who could not attend Camp in the early summer got to attend in the late summer, and vice versa.

The name of the organization that owns the camp has been changed multiple times:

- Foundation for the Junior Blind, 1958 - 2006
- Junior Blind of America, 2006 - 2018
- Wayfinder Family Services, 2018–Present.

== Demise and Reconstruction ==
- On November 9, 2018, Camp Bloomfield was destroyed in the Woolsey fire that swept down from Oak Park to the Pacific Ocean. At the time, there were discussions of selling off the camp, appearing in a CCB article in April 2019. But as of February 1, 2020, reconstruction has been announced.
