= IVillage UK =

British lifestyle website

iVillage UK was a British women's lifestyle website run by media company iVillage, owned by NBC Universal.

== History ==
iVillage UK was established in December 2000 as a British branch of US website iVillage.com. It was shut down in 2014 when its traffic was redirected to the U.S. website.

== Content ==
iVillage UK offers interactive services, expert advice, information and a support network through its online community. Content channels include Diet & Fitness, Relationships, Parenting, Pregnancy & Baby, Health, Beauty, Food & Drink, Home & Garden, Travel, Money, News & Entertainment, Work & Career and Astrology.

At the end of 2009, the website launched its blogging platform. Well-known bloggers include sex and relationship expert Dr Pam Spurr, businessperson Michelle Dewberry and television personality Katy Hill.

In recent years, the website has hosted exclusive video content, including a 2010 mockumentary starring fashion personalities Trinny Woodall and Susannah Constantine.

== Campaigns ==
iVillage UK has been involved in a number of national campaigns promoting women's wellbeing, including an integrated project with Wii Fit, which was nominated for the 2010 New Media Age Entertainment Award.

== See also ==
- Lists of websites
