= Wayfinder Family Services =

U.S.-based blindness charity

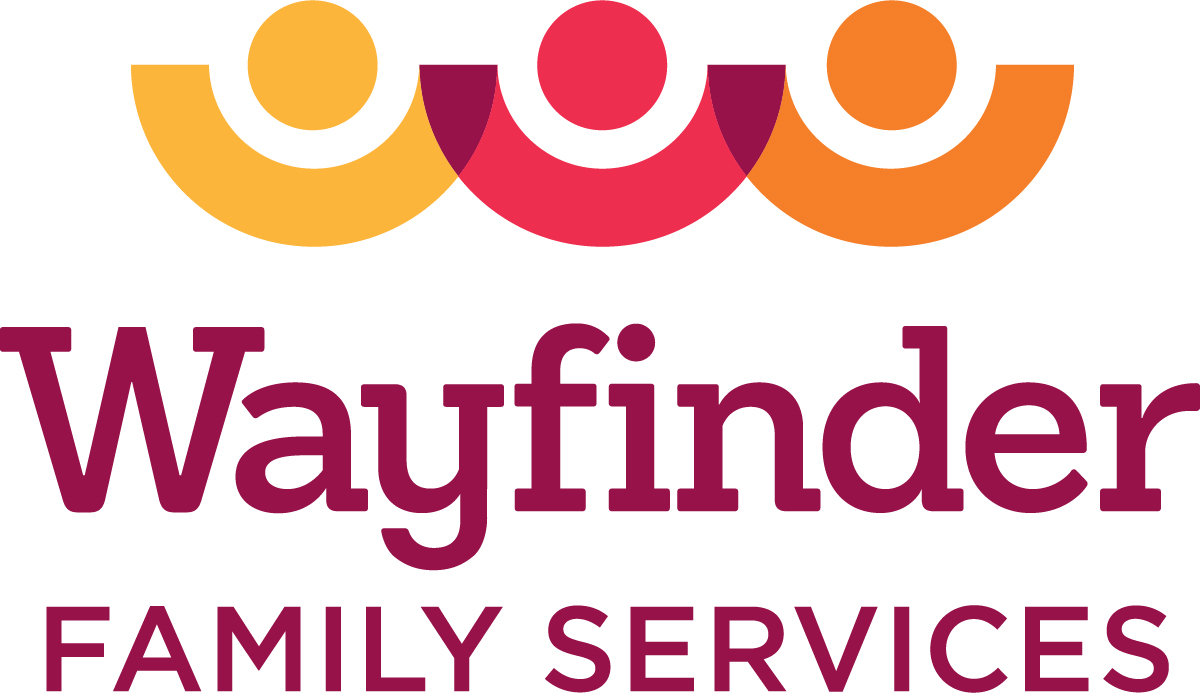
- Founded: 1953
- Type: 501(c)(3)
- Location: Los Angeles, California
- Region served: California
- Key people: Miki Jordan, President and CEO
- Website: www.wayfinderfamily.org

Wayfinder Family Services (WFS), Founded in 1953 as the Foundation for the Junior Blind and previously known as Junior Blind, is a United States–based nonprofit organization for services for the blind. The organization's mission is to help children and adults who are blind, visually impaired, or multi-disabled achieve independence. Located in Los Angeles, WFS offers individualized methods of early intervention, education, recreation, and rehabilitation to nearly 10,000 children and family members throughout California.

President and CEO, Miki Jordan, joined the organization in 2006 as the third CEO. In January 2010, long-time supporter Stevie Wonder joined Junior Blind's board of directors.

== Programs and services ==
Although WFS's programs serve individuals across all stages of life, more than 98% of the people the organization serves are children and youth. Since the "face" of blindness has changed, a large number of the children WFS serves have multiple disabilities, including autism, cerebral palsy, developmental delay, and intellectual disability, in addition to visual impairment.

WFS's children's services are provided in the home, on campus, and throughout the community. Meeting the varying needs of children with special needs from birth to age 21, WFS offers an Infant & Early Childhood Program, a Special Education School, a Children's Residential Program, a Vision Screening Program, and an After School Enrichment Program.

The organization is also committed to helping youth, adults, and Veterans who are blind or visually impaired prepare for a life of independence and success. Providing educational, vocational and independent living instruction through the Student Transition & Enrichment Program and its mobile counterpart, Davidson Program for Independence, Blind Veterans Training Program and Advanced Assistive Technology Training, Junior Blind helps students learn the skills necessary to live independently, seek employment and be productive members of the community.

WFS offers educational and experiential learning through the Visions: Adventures in Learning Program and their Camp Bloomfield in Malibu. Weekend Visions trips to national treasures such as Yosemite, as well as summer camp sessions at Camp Bloomfield, provide children who are blind, visually impaired, or multi-disabled with the chance to build confidence, develop habits toward healthier lifestyles and gain independence.

== Wayfinder Paralympic Games ==
Each year, WFS hosts a number of events for children and families. The organization's signature event, Wayfinder Paralympic Games (formerly known as the Junior Blind Olympics), invites boys and girls ages 6 to 19 to compete in Olympic-style events adapted for the blind. Athletes come from California, Utah, Arizona, Nevada, and elsewhere to compete in such events as rowing, shot put, 100-yard dash, archery, rock wall climbing, and the long jump, among others.
