= Florence Tullis =

Mother to Rocky Dennis

- Born: Florence Steinberg; May 29, 1936; Brooklyn, New York, US
- Died: November 11, 2006 (aged 70); Montebello, California, US
- Other names: Rusty Tullis; Rusty Mason; Rusty Dennis; Rusty Dennis Mason
- Known for: Subject of the film Mask
- Spouse: Roy Wayman Dennis (m. 1959; div. 1977) Tommy Mason (m. 1953, divorced)
- Children: Joshua Mason; Roy L. Dennis

Florence "Rusty" Tullis (née Steinberg; May 29, 1936 – November 11, 2006), also known as Rusty Dennis, Rusty Mason, and Rusty Dennis Mason, was an American woman known for being the mother of Rocky Dennis, who was diagnosed with craniodiaphyseal dysplasia. Their story was depicted in the 1985 film Mask, in which Tullis was portrayed by Cher.

== Biography ==
=== Early life ===
Tullis was born in Brooklyn. Her father was a truck driver. She had two sisters, Dorothy and Bonnie. Tullis was Jewish.

When she was 13, Tullis got kicked out of junior high school for truancy. At age 14, she began smoking marijuana and riding with bikers. At age 15, she dropped out of school and worked as a "hoochie coochie" dancer at Coney Island.

=== Marriages and children ===
When she was 17, Tullis married her first husband, truck driver Tommy Mason; two years later, their son Joshua was born. The marriage was dysfunctional, and shortly after the birth of Joshua, Tullis moved back with her parents on Coney Island. There, she worked as an exhibit hawker. In 1961, she married her second husband Roy Dennis. That same year, they moved to Covina, California. Their son Roy L. "Rocky" Dennis was born on December 4, 1961.

In a 1985 interview with People, Tullis said, "They tried to say his intelligence was impaired, but it wasn't true. I think they wanted to keep him out of the classroom because [they thought] it would bother the other kids' parents."

Rocky's body was donated to the UCLA genetics research center for science and then cremated. Tullis married her third husband, Bernie Tullis, but they separated after six weeks of marriage, both of them still grief-stricken over Rocky's death. The character Gar, played by Sam Elliott in the 1985 film Mask, is based on Bernie. After Rocky's death, Tullis moved to San Francisco and took up Buddhism. At one point in her life, Tullis resumed the name Mason.

In 1985, Tullis' elder son, Joshua, became a writer based in San Francisco. Joshua was homosexual and came out to his mother when he was a teenager. Joshua died of AIDS in 1987 at age 32.

=== Media portrayal and response ===
Tullis was paid $15,000 for the film rights to her story, which became the film Mask. Tullis described the film as a "fairy tale." In an interview with the Chicago Tribune, Tullis said, "I thought Mask was going to be a movie about Rocky. I always thought showing Rocky's courage would help a lot of disabled kids and the parents of disabled kids — sometimes they are more disabled than their kids. I didn't realize the movie would be about me, too. Thanks to Cher's brilliance, I come off a kind of heroine." She also said of Cher's performance, "Cher depicted the way I am very well. I always thought I was perfectly normal, that the rest of the world is nuts."

=== Later life ===
At the time of her death, Tullis was living in Glendora with her sister and niece.

=== Legal issues ===
Tullis had a number of run-ins with the law over her drug use over the years.

In 1996, she was sentenced to two years in prison after pleading guilty to a meth possession charge.

In 2001, she was placed on three years' probation for drug possession.

In May 2002, she was sentenced to 16 months in prison for admitting she violated probation on a drug charge.

She completed a prison sentence for possession of methamphetamines in April 2005.

=== Death and legacy ===
Tullis died of an infection on November 11, 2006, at Beverly Hospital in Montebello, California. She was 70. Tullis wanted her body to be donated to science or be cremated.

Anna Hamilton Phelan, screenwriter of Mask, said of Tullis in 2001, "This was not the PTA mother of the year, but she was the perfect mother for Rocky. She never made him feel sorry for himself."
