= Robert Levitan =

American businessman (born 1961)

Robert Levitan (born April 22, 1961) is an American businessman best known for his multiple entrepreneurial activities in New York City's Silicon Alley, the cluster of web and technology businesses stretching from Manhattan's Flatiron District through SoHo and TriBeCa.

== Career ==
=== iVillage ===
In 1995, Levitan co-founded iVillage, one of Silicon Alley's "first settlers" and a startup that would eventually become the web's largest community for women, with Candice Carpenter, former president of Time-Life Video, and Nancy Evans, ex-president and -publisher of Doubleday. Having never sold ads before, except for his sixth-grade yearbook, Levitan was charged with building the company's advertising department, and he conceived of a strategy beyond selling the nascent standard: the web banner.

Levitan's model gave sponsors, paying between $75,000 and $150,000 for 6- or 12-month terms, the option to build "bridge sites," which sat between iVillage editorial pages and the sponsors' own corporate sites. Straight links to sponsors' corporate websites, which often had no relevance to iVillage readers, were discouraged. Bridge sites, alternatively, could fulfill marketers' objectives and at the same time provide content as engaging as the iVillage websites themselves, much like what advertisers, nearly 20 years later, call native advertising and tout as an effective banner alternative.

Once Levitan made a sale, iVillage's sponsorship department provided the assistance of an ad agency and web development shop combined – with one fundamental difference: they had the experience of being a web publisher. Services included site concepts and wireframes, content and design, community-building techniques, sweepstakes and other promotions, site creation and maintenance – all for an additional fee.

Parents visiting Polaroid's bridge site, for example, learned how to increase their child's self esteem using instant photography via weekly confidence-boosting activities, informational articles and live chats with psychologists and other experts. "I love the notion that they're working with us collaboratively," said Carol Phelan, the senior marketing communications manager at Polaroid, which bought a one-year sponsorship. "I don't even think of this as advertising."

By May 1996, Levitan had sold out a year's worth of sponsorships for iVillage's debut site, Parent Soup, and that September, he was named one of Advertising Age's 20 Digital Media Masters. In March 1998, Levitan sold the company's highest-ticket sponsorship to date to Charles Schwab: a $5-million-plus exclusive sponsorship of "Armchair Millionaire," a financial-planning site produced by iVillage, Intuit and Schwab.

By 1998, sponsorship revenue exceeded $12 million, and momentum was building for iVillage's initial public offering of shares. When the company went public in March 1999, iVillage was worth $1.86 billion. (In 2006, the company was acquired for $600 million in cash by NBC Universal, which operates the women's network within its Digital News Group.)

=== Flooz ===
By early 1999, Levitan had left iVillage and launched Flooz.com, a digital currency company. A consumer could go to the company website to buy Flooz, which was e-mailed to someone in a digital greeting card; the recipient could then spend the Flooz at any participating ecommerce site including J.Crew, Barnes & Noble and Tower Records. Levitan hired Whoopi Goldberg as company spokesperson and launched a series of television commercials. The company sold $3 million of Flooz currency in the first year and $25 million in 2000. The marketing director for TowerRecords.com, Russ Eisenman, said Flooz attracted new shoppers to the online site. On certain days, he said, gift recipients redeeming Flooz made up half the site's business.

In 2001, the Federal Bureau of Investigation notified Levitan that the company had fallen victim to Internet fraud – specifically from money-laundering credit-card thieves in Russia and the Philippines. Declaring Chapter 7 bankruptcy, Levitan announced the company would cease operations in late August 2001. The Flooz bankruptcy was unprecedented for a few reasons:

- It had the largest number of creditors involved on record.
- It was the first time email was used as a form of legal communication with creditors.
- The security code frequently requested when making a credit card payments has been attributed to the fraud that brought down Flooz.

=== Pando Networks ===
In 2004, Levitan built his third Manhattan-based technology business, as CEO of Pando Networks. The company specializes in hybrid peer-to-peer plus server-based cloud distribution of large files. From the beginning, the company launched a freemium consumer business for sending large files over any email account, later adding tools for media distributors and publishers to distribute games, video and software to consumers. Levitan eventually drove sales and product development in the direction of game publishers. Numerous game companies signed on for Pando Networks' services, and Pando software delivered 200 million unique video games onto computer desktops in 2011 alone.

Because of the massive amounts of data delivered over its networks worldwide, Pando Networks was able to compile and release two studies on broadband delivery speeds, one domestic and one global. The domestic report prompted observations that the best speeds were recorded in wealthy suburbs like Andover, Massachusetts versus the sluggish performance seen in more rural areas, such as in Pocatello, Idaho where downloads were at one-tenth the speed of Andover's. Discussing this with a Bloomberg television reporter, Levitan spoke out about the regional disparity, calling it a business, political and social issue. "From a political standpoint, the FCC [U.S. Federal Communications Commission] and others are looking at this, but we all know it's hard to find agreement in Washington on what to do. If we all believe that fast Internet speeds are good for the economy and development … and if we believe they are as important as the Internet was in developing commerce, then it's important that this [vast speed discrepancy] is addressed." Pando Networks was acquired by Microsoft in 2013.

=== Live XYZ ===
In 2014, Levitan co-founded Live XYZ. The company built a live map of cities showing every business on every block, and what's happening inside each location by time of day. Live XYZ data provided retail storefront vacancy rates for a study by the NYC Department of City Planning released in August 2019, and for a study released in September 2019 by the Office of the New York City Comptroller.

=== Prone2Help ===
Prior to joining Igentify, Levitan was Executive Director of Prone2Help. This non-profit was founded by Levitan and his two brothers, Dr. Richard Levitan and Dan Levitan, in April 2020. Prone2Help was founded after Robert's twin brother, Richard, an emergency medicine airway specialist, volunteered in March 2020 to treat COVID-19 patients at Bellevue Hospital in New York City (NYC) during the early days of the COVID-19 pandemic.

Dr. Levitan and other NYC emergency room doctors realized that proning patients on their stomachs while providing oxygen was an effective alternative to intubation for many patients. Two mattress manufacturers, Earthlite in California and Oakworks Medical in Pennsylvania, worked with Dr. Levitan to design new patient proning cushions. Robert worked with FedEx to get a significant shipping discount for the nonprofit and designed a process whereby the cushions shipped directly from the manufacturer to a hospital, sometimes in just one day. Robert developed partnerships with device manufacturers to provide these proning cushions at no cost to hospitals that requested them, and to deliver them in a timely matter to match the urgency of the situation. Within 18 months, Prone2Help manufactured and delivered more than 1,200 proning cushions to 512 hospitals across the United States.

=== Igentify ===
From 2020 to 2023, Levitan served as Chief Commercial Officer of Igentify, a provider of cloud-based software solutions for genetic testing and genetic counseling services. As Chief Commercial Officer, Levitan was responsible for developing the company's sales, marketing, and strategic partnership initiatives.

== Other activities ==
From 2000 to 2009, Levitan served on the board of Mobius Management Systems, an enterprise archiving and record keeping company acquired by ASG Software Solutions in 2007. From 1992 until 2010, Levitan served on the board of directors of New York Cares, where he remains an honorary board member.
