= Mask (1985 film) =

1985 American biographical drama film by Peter Bogdanovich

- Theatrical release poster
- Directed by: Peter Bogdanovich
- Written by: Anna Hamilton Phelan
- Based on: The true story of Rocky Dennis
- Produced by: Martin Starger
- Starring: Cher; Sam Elliott; Eric Stoltz
- Cinematography: László Kovács
- Edited by: Barbara Ford
- Music by: Dennis Ricotta
- Distributed by: Universal Pictures
- Release date: March 8, 1985
- Running time: 120 minutes
- Country: United States
- Language: English
- Box office: $48.2 million

Mask is a 1985 American biographical drama film directed by Peter Bogdanovich and written by Anna Hamilton Phelan. It stars Cher, Sam Elliott, and Eric Stoltz. The film is based on the life and early death of Roy L. "Rocky" Dennis, a boy who had craniodiaphyseal dysplasia, an extremely rare genetic disorder known commonly as lionitis due to the disfiguring cranial enlargements that it causes. Mask won the Academy Award for Best Makeup at the 58th ceremony, while Cher and Stoltz received Golden Globe Award nominations for their performances and Cher won the 1985 Cannes Film Festival award for Best Actress.

== Plot ==
In 1979 Azusa, California, the film follows Rocky Dennis, a teenage boy with the extremely rare genetic disorder known as craniodiaphyseal dysplasia. He is accepted without question by his freewheeling bohemian biker mother Florence "Rusty" Dennis, her boyfriend Gar, who is a father figure to him, his "extended motorcycle family," and his maternal grandparents who share his passion of baseball card collecting. However, many others treat Rocky with fear, pity, awkwardness, and teasing by those unaware of his humanity, humor, and intelligence.

Rocky's unstable mother is determined to give Rocky as normal a life as possible, in spite of her eccentric and chaotic life as a member of the Turks biker gang, as well as her strained relationship with her father Abe. She fights for Rocky's enrollment in a mainstream junior high school, and confronts the principal Mr. Simms who would rather classify Rocky as intellectually disabled and relegate him to a special education school, completely ignoring the fact that his condition has not affected Rocky's intelligence.

At his semi-annual physical, Rocky claims to be feeling well despite recurring excruciating headaches that Rusty can simply remedy by helping to calm him by focusing on happy memories. A young inexperienced doctor tells Rusty that Rocky's life expectancy is limited to only less than six months, but she scoffs, angrily pointing out how other doctors made erroneous claims about Rocky's condition that were all completely disproven such as he would be deaf, blind or intellectually impaired.

Rocky goes on to thrive at school, making many friends with his wit and humor, tutoring his classmates for $3 per hour, as well as assisting a fellow student with his locker combination, and telling an entertaining rendition of the Trojan Wars to his history class. Shortly before graduation, he is asked by the principal to accept a job as a counselor's aide at Camp Bloomfield, a summer camp for visually impaired children, which he is hesitant to accept. At his graduation from junior high, Rocky takes home several academic achievement prizes in mathematics, history and science.

Rocky feels the need to help his chronically depressed and drug-addicted mother break her drug habit by leaving drug rehabilitation program pamphlets around the house one night at a party. This causes an explosive argument to erupt between them and he decides to accept the job offer as a camp counselor as a means of escape. At camp, Rocky falls in love with Diana Adams, an attractive blind teenage girl, who cannot see but feels Rocky's deformed face and is entranced by Rocky's kindness and compassion. Rocky explains to Diana words like "billowy", "clouds", "red" and "green" by using cotton balls as a touchable vision of "billowy clouds", a warm rock to explain "red" and "pink", and a frozen rock to explain "icy blue". Diana and Rocky also share their first kiss at a New Year's Eve themed dance. At the end of camp, Diana introduces Rocky to her parents, who are horrified by his abnormal appearance and forbid Diana to spend time with him.

Rocky finds it more difficult with attending a high school with none of his old friends from junior high, and continues to encounter increased cruelty from students regarding his deformed face. However, where Rocky used to respond to it with wit and humor, one day he lashes out and slams a bully against a locker after being taunted for having a “mask”. He is further crushed when his lifelong ambitious dream of a motorbike trip through Europe is shattered when his best friend Ben, who was to accompany him, reveals he is leaving Azusa and moving back to Michigan permanently to live with his father. However, Rocky is able to take a bus trip to visit Diana at the equestrian stables, located near Griffith Park, where Rocky learns that her parents have prevented her from receiving his phone calls and messages and are sending her to a private boarding school for the blind and they will likely never see each other again. Despite this, Rocky vows that despite being separated, they will always love each other and will always be together even in their memories.

One evening, when Rocky's biker family is visiting and trying to cheer him up, Rocky is fighting an excruciating headache and withdraws to his room, removes the tacks from his map of Europe, and goes to sleep.

The next morning, Rusty gets a call from the school, questioning why Rocky is absent. Rusty finds him in his bedroom and tries to wake him up, but she realizes that Rocky has died in his sleep and flies into a fit of grief-stricken rage, destroying the kitchen. After mourning Rocky's death, Rusty then hugs Rocky's corpse and tearfully tells Rocky, "Now you can go anywhere you want, baby," and re-pins his map to the wall.

Rocky's biker family, Rusty, Gar and Dozer, later visit his grave, leaving flowers and some 1955 Brooklyn Dodgers baseball cards by his headstone, while a voice-over by Rocky himself is heard reciting the poem he wrote for English class.

== Cast ==
- Cher as Florence "Rusty" Dennis, Rocky's eccentric semi-unstable drug addicted (but fiercely determined) mother.
- Sam Elliott as Gar, a member of Rocky's motorcycle family, who acts as a father figure and occasional peacemaker between Rocky and Rusty, and whose character is based on Bernie Tullis.
- Eric Stoltz as Roy L. "Rocky" Dennis, a highly intelligent, outgoing humorous adolescent boy who was born with craniodiaphyseal dysplasia. His character's Academy Award winning makeup was provided by Michael Westmore and Zoltan Elek.
- Estelle Getty as Evelyn Steinberg, Rusty's mother and Rocky's grandmother who tries to mediate the tension between her husband and her daughter.
- Richard Dysart as Abe Steinberg, Rusty's father and Rocky's grandfather who has a loving relationship with his grandson, but a tumultuous relationship with his daughter.
- Laura Dern as Diana Adams, an attractive and blind teenage girl from summer camp who becomes Rocky's love interest; the two form a bond based on personality, humor and conversation, rather than physical appearances.
- Micole Mercurio as Babe, Ben's mother.
- Harry Carey Jr. as Red, an elderly biker who shares Rocky's passion of baseball card collecting and gifts him a map of Europe and later dies unexpectedly near the end of the film.
- Dennis Burkley as Dozer, the toughest member of the gang who is mostly silent and intimidating and protective of Rocky, but occasionally speaks with a speech impediment praise of Rocky.
- Barry Tubb as Dewey
- Lawrence Monoson as Ben, Rocky's best friend who trades baseball cards and plans a biking trip across Europe with Rocky.
- Ben Piazza as Mr. Simms, the principal of Rocky's Junior high school who initially rejects Rocky, but enrolls him after Rocky's mother intimidates him.
- L. Craig King as Eric
- Alexandra Powers as Lisa
- Kelly Jo Minter as Lorrie
- Joe Unger as the first boyfriend
- Todd Allen as Canuck
- Howard Hirdler as Stickman
- Andrew Robinson as Dr. Vinton, a doctor who gives Rocky a physical
- Ivan J. Rado as Dr. Rudinsky, a doctor who gives Rocky a physical
- Les Dudek as Bone
- Marsha Warfield as the homeroom teacher
- Allison Roth as Nancy Lawrence
- Barry Tubb as Dewey
- Toni Sawyer as Mrs. Adams, the mother of Diana
- Lou Felder as Mr. Adams, the father of Diana
- Jill Whitlow as Anne Marie

== Production ==
Rusty Dennis sold the film rights to Rocky's life story for $15,000 (equivalent to $48,077.96 in 2026 adjusted for inflation), most of which went to pay medical bills for her son Joshua, who was undergoing treatment for AIDS and notably never appeared or even gets mentioned in the film. She originally hoped the film would focus on Rocky's life and intrepid personality rather than giving equal emphasis to her story, but was won over by Cher's role, stating: "Cher depicted the way I am very well. I always thought I was perfectly normal, that the rest of the world is nuts."

In 1984, camp scenes for the movie were filmed at Camp Bloomfield. Campers and staff got a preview of the finished film at Universal Studios in February 1985.

Bogdanovich had originally intended to use several songs by Bruce Springsteen, the real Rocky Dennis' favorite singer. However, due to an impasse at the time between Universal Pictures and Springsteen's label, Columbia Records, the songs were pulled from the film and replaced with songs by Bob Seger for the original theatrical release. Rusty Dennis was unhappy with this, and voiced her displeasure in a 1985 appearance on San Francisco talk show, People Are Talking, saying: "I don't think [Rocky] even knew who Bob Seger was". Bogdanovich sued Universal for $19 million, alleging the film studio switched the music without his approval in violation of his final cut privilege. The Springsteen songs were eventually restored for the 2004 director's cut DVD of the film.

== Reception ==
=== Box office ===
The film was a box office success, garnering US$48,230,162 in total. In its fourth weekend of release, it ranked Number 2 at the domestic box office, and remained in that ranking for the following two weekends.

=== Critical reception ===
Reviews were mostly positive. The film has a 93% approval rating on review aggregator Rotten Tomatoes, based on 29 reviews, with an average rating of 7.5/10.

Roger Ebert of The Chicago Sun-Times said Mask was a "wonderful movie, a story of high spirits and hope and courage," with Stoltz's performance establishing a believable character that transcends his deformity and Cher's characterization of Rusty as "one of the most interesting movie characters in a long time." Gene Siskel described Mask as "superb" and also singled out Cher's portrayal of Rusty as the heart of the film, but criticized the marketing campaign that kept Stoltz's face secretive as a revival of a freak show mentality. Dolores Barclay of the Associated Press declared Mask was "directed with great sensitivity by Peter Bogdanovich" and carried by Cher and Stoltz's performances but believed the depiction of Rusty's biker friends was "perhaps a bit too sanitized to be believable." A contrasting review by Vincent Canby in The New York Times read in part, "Mask is one of those movies that try so hard to get their supposedly universal message across (don't we all hide behind a mask of one sort or another?) that they are likely to put your teeth on edge more often than they bring one little, lonely teardrop to the eye."

Filmink magazine argued "The cuts insisted on by the studio were actually reasonable. This film should’ve brought Bogdanovich back to the A List, but he carried on, trying to sue to studio for millions."

=== Accolades ===
| Award | Date of ceremony | Category | Recipient(s) | Result | Ref. |
|---|---|---|---|---|---|
| Academy Awards | March 24, 1986 | Best Makeup | Michael Westmore and Zoltan Elek | Won | |
| British Academy Film Awards | March 16, 1986 | Best Makeup and Hair | Michael Westmore | Nominated | |
| Cannes Film Festival | May 19, 1985 | Palme d'Or | Mask | Nominated | |
| Cannes Film Festival | May 19, 1985 | Best Actress | Cher | Won | |
| Casting Society of America | October 29, 1986 | Feature Film Casting — Drama | Jackie Burch | Nominated | |
| Golden Globe Awards | January 24, 1986 | Best Actress in a Motion Picture – Drama | Cher | Nominated | |
| Golden Globe Awards | January 24, 1986 | Best Supporting Actor – Motion Picture | Eric Stoltz | Nominated | |
| Jupiter Awards | 1986 | Best Actress | Cher | Nominated | |
| Los Angeles Film Critics Association | January 23, 1986 | New Generation Award | Laura Dern | Won | |
| Writers Guild of America Awards | 1986 | Best Screenplay Written Directly for the Screenplay | Anna Hamilton Phelan | Nominated | |
| Your Choice For The Film Awards | 1986 | Best Actress | Cher | Won | |

== See also ==
- The Elephant Man (film)
- Wonder (film)
- "The Post-Modern Prometheus"—An episode of The X-Files that makes references to this film.
