= CherFitness: A New Attitude =

Video by Cher
- Released: 1991
- Genre: Fitness
- Length: 90 mins
- Label: CBS/Fox Video

Cher chronology
CherFitness: A New Attitude (1991)	CherFitness: Body Confidence (1992)

CherFitness: A New Attitude is the first fitness video released by singer/actress Cher.

== Background ==
During a hugely successful musical comeback, and after establishing herself as a major Hollywood actress with her Academy Award win, Cher began to branch her career into other directions. She released her own range of cosmetics, including a perfume. She resumed touring, contributed to multiple soundtracks and tribute albums, and featured in many infomercials. She also started directing some of her own music videos, found success in interior design and started her own production company. Her next project were Forever Fit (1991), a wellness book, and the CherFitness exercise videos. She had featured in many gym, and fitness commercials in the eighties, and her recent music videos, stage and television appearances made the public interested in her youthful body, as she was in her mid-forties. This led to the opportunity to a fitness video.

== Contents ==
After an introduction from Cher, the programme is divided into three modular sections, starting with a 38-minute "Step Workout". This is followed by a 10-minute workout for "Healthy Back and Abdominals", concluding with 32 minutes working on "Hips, Bottoms and Thighs". The workouts are done against a soundtrack, including hit singles by various artists, as well as Cher's own "Love and Understanding", released that same year. Cher states that this is her personal workout programme designed by her personal trainers, that she does every day, unlike the follow-up fitness video, which was not her daily workout.

== Reception ==
The back cover of the original 1991 VHS release boasts a 5 star rating, the highest available, from "Health & Fitness" with an attached quote that the video "...Stands out as a top quality programme". By December 1992, it sold 1.5 million copies in the US and 350.000 in the UK and has become one of the most successful fitness videos of all time. Its success prompted the quick release of a follow-up, CherFitness: Body Confidence the following year. Both videos have since been released on DVD. The video won the Video Software Dealers Association award in 1992. It also peaked #7 in the Billboard Top Video Sales, and #4 in the Billboard Top Special Interest Video Sales.

== Credits ==
- Producer: Nancy DiToro
- Director: David Grossman
- Writer: Peg Jordan R.M.
- Music Director: Mark Hudson
