= Roy L. Dennis =

American teenager with craniodiaphyseal dysplasia (1961–1978)

Roy L. "Rocky" Dennis
- Dennis's 1977 junior high school yearbook photo.
- Born: Roy Lee Dennis; December 4, 1961; Glendora, California, U.S.
- Died: October 4, 1978 (aged 16); Covina, California, U.S.
- Cause of death: Complications of craniodiaphyseal dysplasia
- Other name: Rocky Dennis
- Parent(s): Florence Tullis; Roy Dennis

Roy Lee "Rocky" Dennis (December 4, 1961 – October 4, 1978) was an American teenager who had craniodiaphyseal dysplasia, an extremely rare sclerotic bone disorder. The condition usually results in neurological disorders and death during childhood. His life was the basis for the drama film Mask (1985) in which he was portrayed by Golden Globe nominee Eric Stoltz.

== Early life ==
Roy Lee "Rocky" Dennis was born in Glendora, California, to Florence "Rusty" Tullis and Roy Dennis on December 4, 1961. When he was very young, Dennis frequently had ear and sinus infections. While he was undergoing a tonsillectomy at age two, doctors detected abnormalities in his x-rays. Over the next year, he visited doctors at University of California, Los Angeles (UCLA)'s medical center multiple times a week, culminating in a diagnosis of craniodiaphyseal dysplasia (CDD), an extremely rare bone disorder that causes bone tissue to build up excessively, including in the skull, causing gradual compression of the brain and thus intracranial hypertension.

In 1965, Rocky said doctors had told him there were seven recorded cases of CDD, and based on those few, they predicted that the pressure from bone accumulation on the central nervous system and cranial nerves would destroy Rocky's eyesight and hearing, and eventually affect his brain, anticipating he would die before his seventh birthday.

== After diagnosis ==
After receiving the diagnosis of CDD, he lived with his parents and older half-brother Joshua in Covina and Glendora. Many of Rocky's biker friends frequented their home, as a secondary support system for the family, particularly following Dennis' parents' divorce in 1971.

Rusty describes her medical philosophy as "I decided early in my life if you could make yourself sick, you could make yourself well", and she taught Dennis that. When he complained of a headache, Rusty told him to go to his room and "don't come out until you have made yourself well." He also used breathing exercises and biofeedback to cope with the pain caused by his CDD.

His vision worsened with age, and he was declared legally blind at age six. When he was seven, an ophthalmologist said his poor vision meant he would never learn to read. Rusty handed Dennis a book, which he promptly read aloud before telling the doctor, "I don't believe in being blind."

Dennis had the opportunity to undergo plastic surgery that could correct his facial deformities and potentially extend his life, but decided against it. He asked Rusty "Who will I see in the mirror if I change my face?"

=== Schooling ===
Some details about his early schooling are unclear, due to inconsistent statements given by Rusty. In 1985, she appeared on local San Francisco interview program People are Talking, and told the hosts she lied about Dennis's age to enroll him in school at age four-and-a-half. When the school found out about his real age, they told Rusty that he could not stay enrolled, but offered a "special school he [could] go to" instead, which she accepted. She went on to say that Dennis spent "a couple of years" at that school "learning the things that they teach handicapped people" before she began trying to enroll him in public school, by which time he was seven years old. However that year, People Magazine reported that he began school when he was six years old, and in 1986, the Chicago Tribune reported that Rusty had "raised hell" at the idea of Dennis being placed in a "separate school for the handicapped".

When Rusty attempted to enroll Dennis in school, she was met with significant pushback due to concerns he might be intellectually disabled, but she alleges the school staff were actually bothered by his appearance and concerned with what the other children's parents might think. She was successful at campaigning on his behalf and enrolled him in public school, where he was initially academically behind his classmates, but quickly caught up and graduated from Sandburg Junior High as an honors student.

=== Death ===
By September 1978, his health had deteriorated such that he used a wheelchair for the final weeks of his life. On October 3, the family ate out at a restaurant and it was clear to everyone how weak he had become. That evening, he had a headache, and just as she always had, Rusty instructed him to go to his room and "make himself well". Dennis died the next morning, October 4. Rusty said she heard him stirring around 6 am, but he was dead when she went to check on him at 10 am. His body was donated to UCLA's genetics research center and cremated afterward. His official cause of death was sudden arrhythmic death syndrome, a condition of unknown origin that may have been related to CDD.

== In popular culture ==
Peter Bogdanovich directed the drama film Mask (1985), from Anna Hamilton Phelan's screenplay, loosely based on Dennis's life. Most of the scenes and dialogue were altered for dramatic purposes. Rusty told a Chicago Tribune reporter that the film was mostly accurate but with two major departures from reality — the events occurred across 10 to 12 years, rather than one year as depicted in the film; and Dennis's older half-brother, Joshua, is not in the film.

Phelan adapted her screenplay into a stage musical called Mask, with music by Barry Mann and Cynthia Weil. It premiered at the Pasadena Playhouse in California on March 12, 2008.

Swedish pop musician Jens Lekman self-published a song titled "Rocky Dennis' Farewell Song to the Blind Girl", causing disc jockeys to mistakenly call the musician Rocky Dennis. In 2004, Lekman released Rocky Dennis in Heaven, an EP containing "Rocky Dennis' Farewell Song to the Blind Girl" and two other songs about him.
