= Craniodiaphyseal dysplasia =

- Other names: CDD or Lionitis
- Craniodiaphyseal dysplasia has an autosomal recessive pattern of inheritance

Craniodiaphyseal dysplasia (CDD), also known as lionitis, is an extremely rare autosomal recessive bone disorder that causes calcium to build up in the skull, disfiguring the facial features and reducing life expectancy.

These calcium deposits reduce the size of cranial foramen, and can decrease the circumference of the cervical spinal canal. In the few cases recorded, most died in childhood.

== Symptoms and signs ==
Symptoms and signs of the condition may include a larger or fuller-than-usual lower jaw, a noticeably long head, a wide nose—particularly between the eyes—and bulging or wider-set eyes. As the bones thicken and pressure increases inside the skull, additional complications can develop, such as blurry vision, eye pain, headaches, seizures, sinus pressure or pain, and difficulty breathing or hearing.

== Cause ==
The underlying genetics are uncertain.

== Diagnosis ==
Among the medical signs are dacryocystitis, seizures, intellectual disability, and paralysis, each of which is a complication resulting from the diminished foramina. A common sign reported as a result of the disease has been widely spaced eyes.

== Society and culture ==
Peter Bogdanovich's 1985 drama film Mask drew public attention to the case of Roy Lee "Rocky" Dennis, an American boy with this disorder who died at the age of 16, in 1978.

In the American medical drama Grey's Anatomy episode "Yesterday", Jesse Plemons plays a teenage boy with lionitis.

The main character of the two-issue comic book miniseries Friday the 13th: How I Spent My Summer Vacation by Wildstorm Productions is a 13-year-old boy with the disorder.

In the anthology television series American Horror Story season 1, Beauregard, the brother of Tate and Adelaide, has lionitis.

== See also ==
- Leontiasis ossea
