= CherFitness: Body Confidence =

Video by Cher
- Released: 1992
- Genre: Fitness
- Length: 90 mins
- Label: CBS/Fox Video

Cher chronology
CherFitness: A New Attitude (1991)	CherFitness: Body Confidence (1992)	Extravaganza: Live at the Mirage (1992)

CherFitness: Body Confidence is the second fitness video by singer and actress Cher.

== Background ==
After the success of her book Forever Fit and the exercise video CherFitness: A New Attitude (both 1991), Cher released a follow-up. Again, it was under the "CherFitness" brand. The programme is very similar to the previous one, due to it having the same team behind it. It also has the same set, although with a different background, this time blue instead of orange/yellow. Like her previous fitness video, this one was co-promoted with The NutraSweet Company.

== Content ==
Unlike the first Cher fitness video, this video is not her own personal workout programme, with her describing herself as a "Student" with the viewer. It begins with a 38 workout called "The Hot Dance," finishing with 45 minutes of "Resistance Band Training." The video includes "...Cher's own selection of music to make your workout even more fun" including her own 1989 monster hit, "If I Could Turn Back Time".

== Reception ==
"Health & Fitness", who gave the previous video the maximum of five stars, gives this one a respectable four stars, stating that it is "...An excellent total body workout." Like the previous video, this video has also been released since on DVD in Zone 2 UK only. It peaked #2 in the Billboard Top Special Interest Video Sales.

== Credits ==
- Producer: Nancy DiToro
- Director: David Grossman
- Writer: Peg Jordan R.M.
- Music Director: Mark Hudson
