= Cher =

American singer and actress (born 1946)

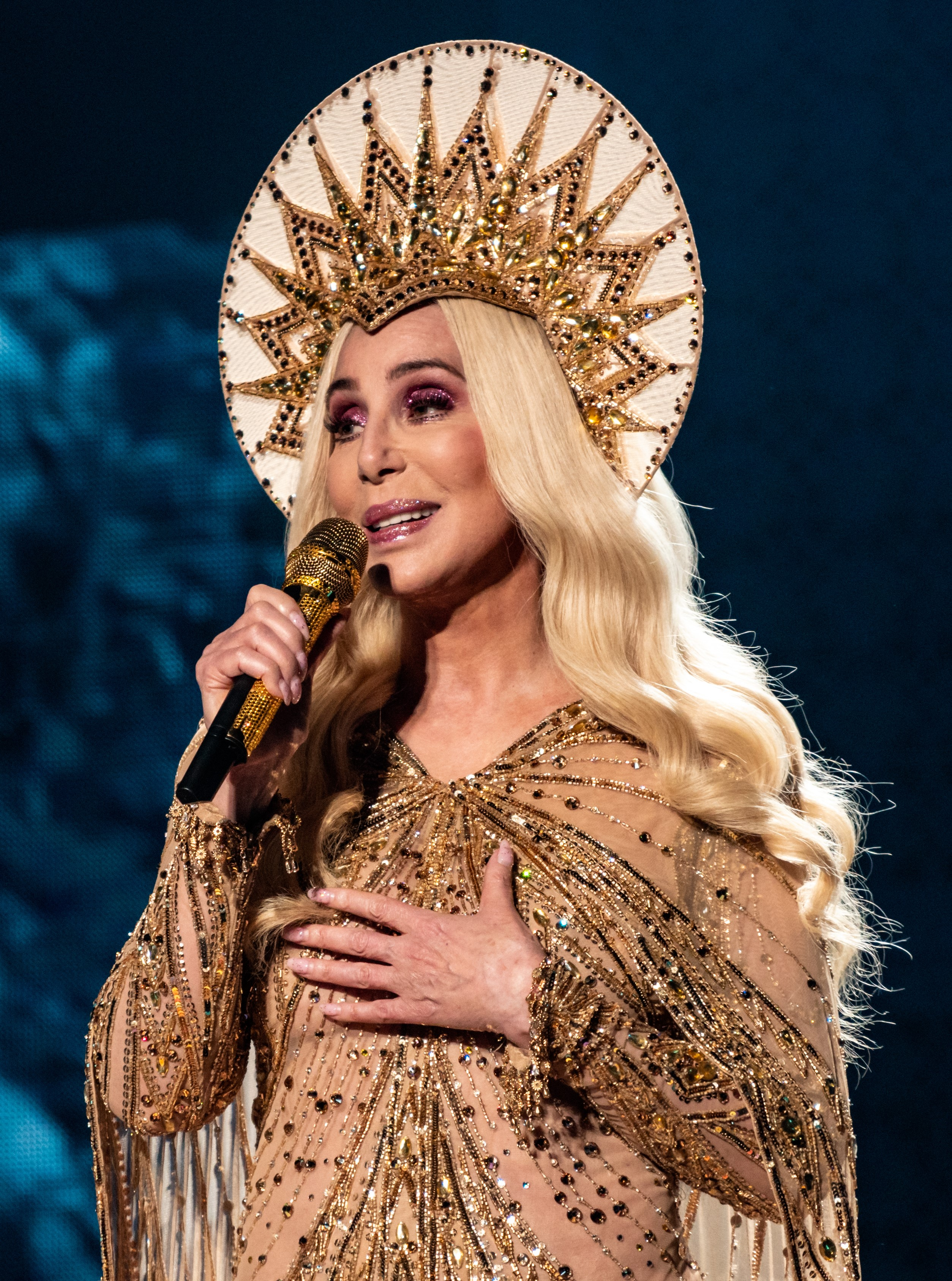
- Cher in 2019
- Born: Cheryl Sarkisian; May 20, 1946 (age 80); El Centro, California, US
- Occupations: Singer; actress
- Years active: 1963–present
- Works: Albums; singles; songs; duo discography; videography; filmography; concerts
- Spouses: Sonny Bono (m. 1969; div. 1975); Gregg Allman (m. 1975; div. 1979)
- Children: Chaz Bono; Elijah Blue Allman
- Relatives: Georgia Holt (mother)
- Awards: Full list
- Musical career
- Genres: Pop; rock; folk; dance
- Instrument: Vocals
- Labels: Atco; Casablanca; Columbia; Geffen; Imperial; Kapp; MCA; Reprise; United Artists; Warner
- Formerly of: Sonny & Cher; Allman and Woman; Black Rose
- Website: cher.com

Cher (/ʃɛər/ SHAIR; legally mononymous; (Note: She legally adopted the mononym Cher in 1979, dropping her first name Cheryl along with the surnames Sarkisian (paternal), LaPiere (her stepfather's) and the married names Bono and Allman.) born Cheryl Sarkisian, (Note: Cher's birth certificate lists her name as Cheryl Sarkisian, contrary to the long-reported Cherilyn. Cher later discovered this when formally changing her name to "Cher", attributing the discrepancy to her mother's recollection of naming her after actress Lana Turner's daughter, Cheryl Crane, and her grandmother, Lynda.) May 20, 1946) is an American singer and actress. Dubbed the "Goddess of Pop", she is known for her androgynous, contralto voice, bold fashion, elaborate stagecraft and multifaceted career. Her screen roles often reflect her public image as a strong-willed, outspoken woman. An influential figure in popular culture, Cher has sustained a career spanning more than six decades through continual reinvention.

Cher rose to fame in 1965 as part of the folk rock duo Sonny & Cher, whose hit single "I Got You Babe" became emblematic of 1960s counterculture. She simultaneously launched a solo career with moody pop songs such as "Bang Bang (My Baby Shot Me Down)", whose theatrical storytelling foreshadowed her 1970s US Billboard Hot 100 number-one singles "Gypsys, Tramps & Thieves", "Half-Breed" and "Dark Lady". After a period of acting, she released the hair metal albums Cher (1987), Heart of Stone (1989) and Love Hurts (1991), scoring international number-one singles "If I Could Turn Back Time" and "The Shoop Shoop Song (It's in His Kiss)". At 52, she released the dance-pop album Believe (1998), which introduced the "Cher effect"—a stylized use of Auto-Tune to distort vocals. Its title track became 1999's number-one song in the US and the UK's best-selling single by a female artist. In the 21st century, she released her highest-charting US Billboard 200 albums, Closer to the Truth (2013) and Dancing Queen (2018), each debuting at number three.

Cher became a TV star in the 1970s with her CBS variety shows The Sonny & Cher Comedy Hour, which drew more than 30 million weekly viewers, and the solo Cher, on which she became the first woman to deliberately expose her navel on American television after fighting network censors. She later gained critical acclaim with her Broadway debut and the film adaptation of Come Back to the 5 & Dime, Jimmy Dean, Jimmy Dean (1982). Transitioning to film, she earned two Academy Award nominations—for Silkwood (1983) and Moonstruck (1987), winning Best Actress for the latter—and received the Cannes Film Festival's Best Actress Award for Mask (1985). Other starring roles include The Witches of Eastwick (1987), Mermaids (1990), If These Walls Could Talk (1996, her directorial debut), Burlesque (2010) and Mamma Mia! Here We Go Again (2018).

One of the best-selling music artists in history, Cher has sold over 100 million records and is the only solo artist with number-one singles on the US Billboard charts in seven consecutive decades (1960s–2020s). Her accolades include two Grammy Awards—among them the Grammy Lifetime Achievement Award—a Primetime Emmy Award, three Golden Globe Awards and the Kennedy Center Honors. She is the only performer to have won an Academy Award for acting and been inducted into the Rock and Roll Hall of Fame. Her 2002–2005 Living Proof: The Farewell Tour was the highest-grossing concert tour by a female artist at the time, earning $250 million—about $410 million in 2025. Her life and career inspired the 2018 jukebox musical The Cher Show. Beyond entertainment, Cher is known for her progressive politics, status as a gay icon and advocacy for causes including LGBTQ rights and HIV/AIDS awareness.

== Life and career ==
=== 1946–1961: Early life ===
Cheryl Sarkisian was born in El Centro, California, on May 20, 1946. Her father, John Sarkisian, an Armenian-American truck driver with drug and gambling problems, was rarely present during her early life. Cher's paternal grandparents were survivors of the Armenian genocide. Her mother, Georgia Holt, was a model and actress of Irish, English, German, French and Dutch descent. Cher's parents divorced when she was 10 months old. Before leaving, her father placed her in an orphanage for several months; Holt was allowed to visit once a week, only able to see Cher through a window. Both found the experience traumatic.

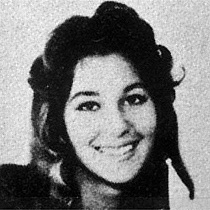
Cher in high school, 1960

In 1951, Holt married actor John Southall, with whom she had Cher's half-sister, Georganne. Holt's marriage to Southall ended when Cher was nine; Cher later described him as her "real father" and a "good-natured man who turned belligerent when he drank too much". Holt remarried and divorced several times, frequently moving the family across states, including New York, Texas and California. They often struggled financially, and Cher recalled using rubber bands to hold her shoes together. While living in Los Angeles, Holt pursued acting while working as a waitress, occasionally securing minor television roles for her daughters in shows such as The Adventures of Ozzie and Harriet.

By fifth grade, Cher organized a class performance of the musical Oklahoma!, taking on male roles when boys refused to participate. At nine, her voice was unusually low for a female child. As a child, she dreamed of fame but struggled with feelings of inadequacy, describing herself as "unattractive" and "untalented". Reflecting on her ambitions, she later said, "I couldn't think of anything that I could do ... I just thought, 'I'll be famous'. That was my goal."

In 1961, Holt married bank manager Gilbert LaPiere, who adopted Cher (under the name Cheryl LaPiere) and Georganne and enrolled them at Montclair College Preparatory School, a private school in Encino. Coming from a modest background, Cher faced challenges in the upper-class environment, where, as biographer Connie Berman wrote, her "striking appearance" and "outgoing personality" set her apart. A former classmate recalled, "I'll never forget seeing Cher for the first time. She was so special ... like a movie star, right then and there ... She said she was going to be a movie star and we knew she would." Known for her creativity and wit, Cher excelled in French and English but struggled with other subjects, later discovering she has dyslexia. Her unconventional behavior also stood out: she performed songs for students during lunch and surprised peers when she wore a midriff-baring top. Reflecting on her lack of focus in school, Cher said, "I was never really [there]. I was always thinking about when I was grown up and famous."

=== 1962–1965: Solo breakthrough ===
At 16, Cher left school and moved out of her mother's home to live with a friend. She took acting classes and supported herself by dancing in nightclubs along Hollywood's Sunset Strip, where she introduced herself to performers, managers and agents. According to Berman, Cher "did not hesitate to approach anyone she thought could help her get a break". She met Sonny Bono, 11 years her senior, in November 1962 while he was working for record producer Phil Spector. After her friend moved out, Cher accepted Sonny's offer to work as his housekeeper.

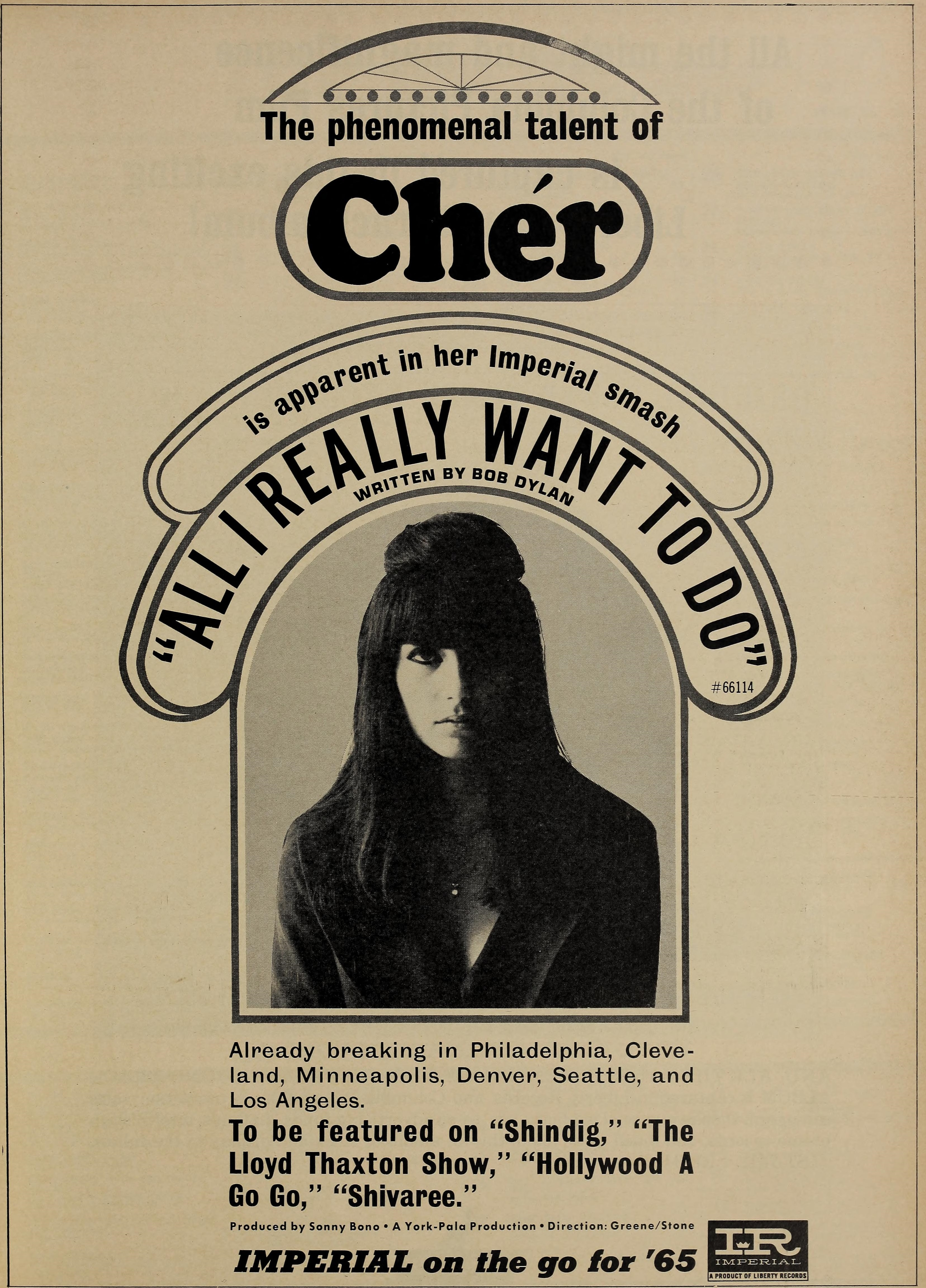
Advertisement for Cher's "All I Really Want to Do" in Cash Box, June 26, 1965

Sonny introduced Cher to Spector, who used her as a backing vocalist on several recordings, including the Righteous Brothers' "You've Lost That Lovin' Feelin'" and the Ronettes' "Be My Baby". Spector also produced her first single, "Ringo, I Love You", released in early 1964 under the name Bonnie Jo Mason. Many radio programmers rejected the song, mistaking Cher's deep contralto for a male voice and assuming it was a gay man singing to the Beatles drummer Ringo Starr.

Cher and Sonny became close friends, then lovers, and held an unofficial wedding ceremony in a hotel room in Tijuana, Mexico, on October 27, 1964. Although Sonny initially intended to launch Cher as a solo artist, she encouraged him to perform with her due to her stage fright, and he began joining her onstage to sing backing vocals. Cher masked her nervousness by looking at Sonny; she later said she sang to the audience through him.

In early 1964, Cher and Sonny recorded together for the first time, releasing "The Letter" as Caesar & Cleo on Vault Records. It featured inverted harmonies—Cher sang the lower part and Sonny the higher—a reversal of the typical male–female vocal roles they continued using in later recordings. Later that year, the duo signed a one-off deal with Reprise Records for another Caesar & Cleo single, "Love Is Strange". A week before its release, their managers reintroduced them to Reprise as a new act—Sonny & Cher—in an effort to secure a more lucrative contract. Unaware they were the same duo, Reprise released both singles simultaneously: "Love Is Strange" as Caesar & Cleo and "Baby Don't Go" as Sonny & Cher. Reprise declined a long-term deal after discovering the connection. While the Caesar & Cleo singles were commercially unsuccessful, "Baby Don't Go" found success in Los Angeles, prompting Atlantic Records to sign them to its Atco label.

In late 1964, Cher signed a solo contract with Liberty Records' Imperial imprint, with Sonny as producer. The single "Dream Baby", released under the name Cherilyn, received airplay in Los Angeles. Encouraged by its early momentum, Imperial requested a follow-up. In summer 1965, she released a cover of Bob Dylan's "All I Really Want to Do", now credited as "Chér". The single peaked at number 15 on the US Billboard Hot 100 and number nine on the UK singles chart. Meanwhile, the Byrds released their own version of the song. As the two versions began competing on the charts, the Byrds' label shifted focus to promoting their single's B-side. Roger McGuinn of the Byrds recalled, "We loved the Cher version ... We didn't want to hassle. So we just turned our record over." Cher's debut album, All I Really Want to Do (1965), reached number 16 on the US Billboard 200. AllMusic's Tim Sendra later called it "one of the stronger folk-pop records of the era".

=== 1965–1967: Sonny and Cher's breakthrough ===
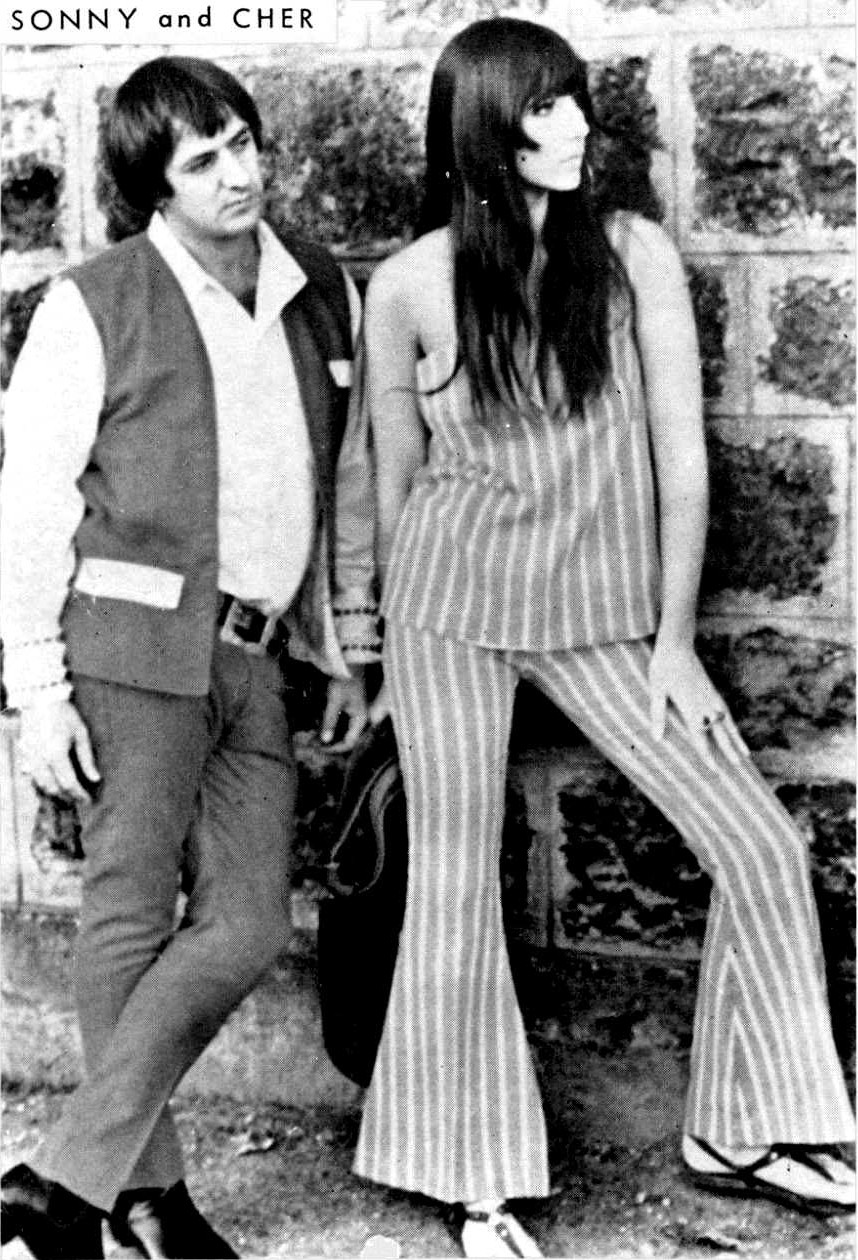
1960s publicity photo of Sonny & Cher

While launching her solo career, Cher continued recording with Sonny as a duo. Sonny & Cher's first Atco single, "Just You", failed to chart upon its April 1965 release. (Note: After "I Got You Babe" topped the US Billboard Hot 100, "Just You" debuted on the same chart in August 1965—four months after its original release—and eventually peaked at number 20.) After recording "I Got You Babe", they traveled to England in July 1965 on the advice of the Rolling Stones. Cher recalled the Stones saying, "Americans just didn't get us and that if we were going to make it big, we were going to have to go to England. According to writer Cintra Wilson,

English newspaper photographers showed up when S&C were thrown out of the London Hilton [because of their outfits] the night they arrived—literally overnight, they were stars. London went gaga for the heretofore-unseen S&C look, which was neither mod nor rocker.

"I Got You Babe" reached number one on the Billboard Hot 100 chart and became, according to AllMusic's Bruce Eder, "one of the biggest-selling and most beloved pop/rock hits of the mid-'60s". As the song displaced the Beatles at the top of the UK charts, English teenagers began emulating Sonny & Cher's fashion—bell-bottoms, striped pants and fur vests. According to Time's Ginia Bellafante, they became "rock's 'it' couple".

After returning to the US in late 1965, the duo made their film debut with a cameo in Wild on the Beach (1965), appeared on teen-oriented TV shows such as Hullabaloo and Shindig! and toured major arenas across the country. Their concerts drew numerous Cher look-alikes, with girls straightening and dyeing their hair black and adopting her signature vests and bell-bottoms.

Sonny & Cher's debut album, Look at Us (1965), spent eight weeks at number two on the Billboard 200, behind the Beatles' Help!. Cash Box magazine described Sonny & Cher, the Beatles and the Rolling Stones as "global stars" whose success in both the US and UK showed that national origin was no longer a barrier to international stardom. Despite the dominance of the British Invasion and Motown, the duo emerged as major chart competitors. Author Joseph Murrells called them "leading exponents of the rock-folk-message type of song", blending rock instrumentation, folk themes and protest lyrics, while The Guardian's Alexis Petridis described their music as "the sound of the growing 60s counterculture".

Following Sonny & Cher's breakthrough, Reprise reissued "Baby Don't Go", which became their second consecutive US top-ten single. At one point, five of their songs appeared simultaneously in the Billboard Hot 100's top 50—a feat previously achieved only by Elvis Presley and the Beatles. Their next studio albums were The Wondrous World of Sonny & Chér (1966) and In Case You're in Love (1967), the latter featuring the US top-ten single "The Beat Goes On" and the international number-one single "Little Man".

Cher's solo career progressed in parallel. Her second studio album, The Sonny Side of Chér (1966), includes "Bang Bang (My Baby Shot Me Down)", which reached number one in Italy, number two in the US and number three in the UK, becoming her first million-selling solo single. Her third studio album, Chér (1966), features the international number-one single "Sunny" and the Burt Bacharach and Hal David composition "Alfie"—the first US recording of the song, which was featured in the American release of the 1966 film Alfie. Her fourth studio album, With Love, Chér (1967), presents songs described by biographer Mark Bego as "little soap-opera stories set to rock music", among them the US top-ten single "You Better Sit Down Kids".

=== 1967–1970: From counterculture icon to lounge act ===
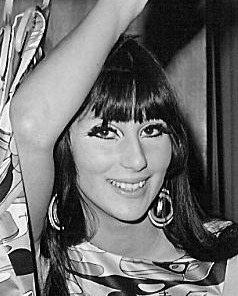
Cher on the set of the television series The Man from U.N.C.L.E., 1967

Sonny committed the duo to a feature film in 1965 during their commercial peak, and production on the musical Good Times ran through 1966. As the press circulated studio stills throughout that year, their public image moved away from the bohemian look that had defined their early success. Journalists viewed their new Hollywood-oriented presentation as out of step with the youth culture they had once symbolized. Their monogamous lifestyle during the sexual revolution, along with their anti-drug stance amid widespread drug use, further distanced them from the counterculture. Bego later wrote that "in spite of their revolutionary unisex clothes, Sonny and Cher were quite 'square' when it came to sex and drugs."

Directed by William Friedkin, Good Times was released in May 1967 and failed commercially at a moment when their record sales were already sliding. By early 1968, the duo's singles had stopped charting. Berman observed that the "heavy, loud sound" of newer acts such as Jefferson Airplane and Cream made their folk rock seem "too bland". Cher later said she "loved" the electric guitar-driven style of Led Zeppelin and Eric Clapton and wanted to adapt, but Sonny refused.

Cher's fifth studio album, Backstage (1968), which explores a range of styles including bossa nova and anti-war protest songs, did not chart. In 1969, Cher was dropped by Imperial Records, and Sonny & Cher were dropped by Atco. Atco then offered Cher a solo deal. Her sixth studio album, 3614 Jackson Highway (1969), recorded at Muscle Shoals Sound Studio without Sonny's involvement, marked a shift toward R&B and soul. Decades later, AllMusic called it "the finest album of her career" and "still a revelation". Displeased with the album, Sonny blocked Cher from releasing further recordings for Atco.

Meanwhile, Sonny dated others, and by the end of the 1960s their relationship had begun to unravel. According to People, Sonny "tried desperately to win her back, telling her he wanted to marry and start a family." They officially married after Cher learned she was pregnant, and she gave birth to Chaz Bono on March 4, 1969. In an effort to regain their young audience, the duo spent $500,000 and mortgaged their home to make the film Chastity (1969). Written and produced by Sonny, it tells the story of a young woman, played by Cher, searching for the meaning of life. The art film failed commercially, putting the couple $190,000 in debt with back taxes. Some critics noted that Cher showed acting potential; Cue magazine wrote, "Cher has a marvelous quality that often makes you forget the lines you are hearing."

At the lowest point in their career, the duo developed a nightclub act with a more adult sound and style. According to writer Cintra Wilson, "Their lounge act was so depressing, people started heckling them. Then Cher started heckling back. Sonny ... reprimanded her; then she'd heckle Sonny". The heckling became a highlight of the act and began drawing audiences. Television executives took notice, and the couple began appearing on prime-time shows with a "new, sophisticated and mature" image. Cher adopted alluring, low-cut gowns that became her signature look.

=== 1971–1974: Television stardom and first musical comeback ===
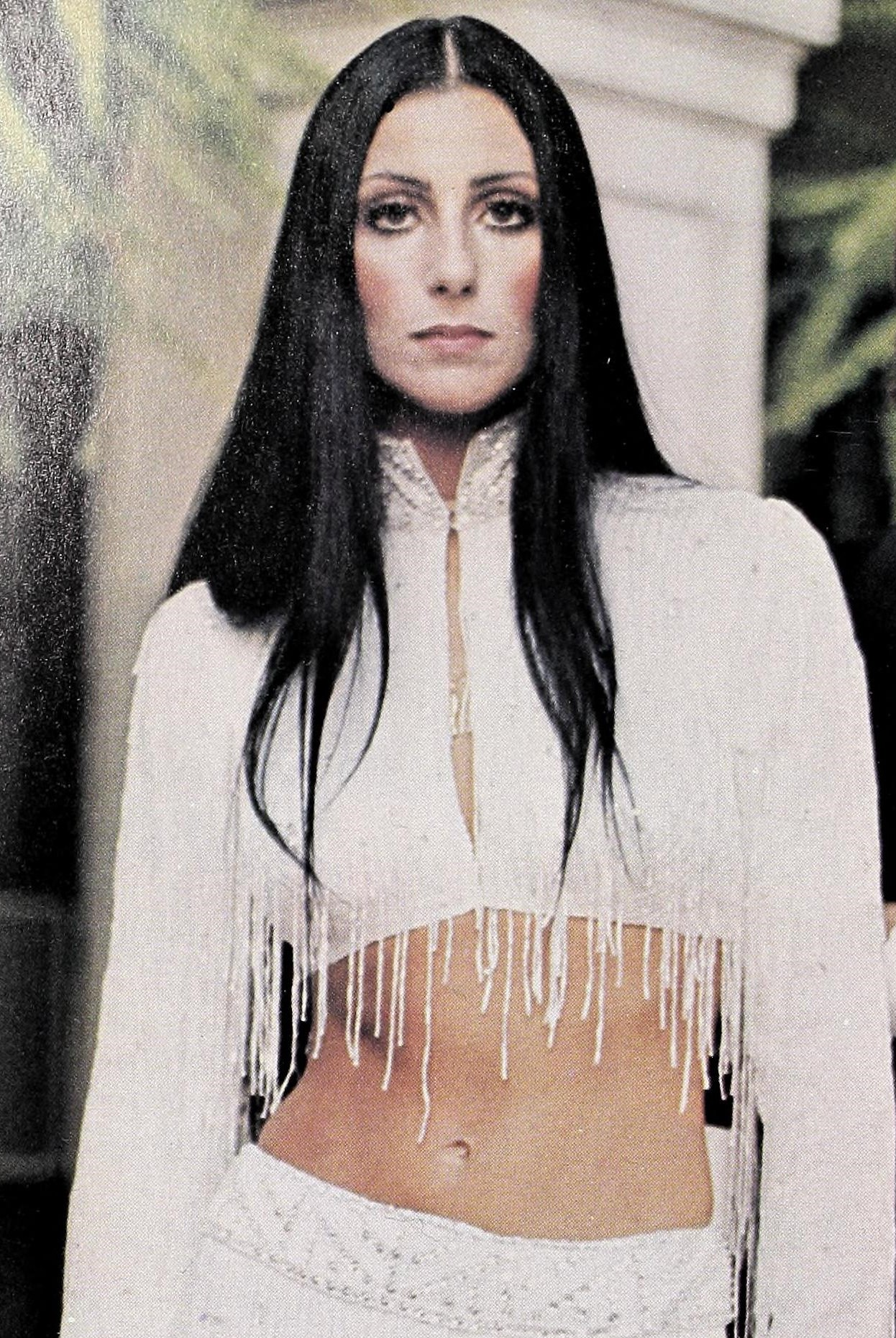
1972 publicity photo of Cher

CBS head of programming Fred Silverman offered Sonny and Cher their own TV program after he noticed them as guest-hosts on The Merv Griffin Show in 1971. (Note: On May 31, 1971, Sonny and Cher starred in The Sonny & Cher Nitty Gritty Hour, a Canadian TV special recorded in 1970 and sometimes described as a precursor to their CBS series. In 2015, David Winters claimed he created the comedy-music format and pitched it to ABC, which opted for the Smothers Brothers instead. Winters said CBS later used his concept to develop The Sonny & Cher Comedy Hour. He considered legal action but ultimately did not pursue it, maintaining that the show was based on his idea.) The Sonny & Cher Comedy Hour premiered as a summer replacement series on August 1, 1971, and had six episodes. Following its ratings success, the couple returned that December with a full-time show.

Watched by more than 30 million viewers weekly during its three-year run, The Sonny & Cher Comedy Hour was praised for the comedic timing, as a deadpan Cher mocked Sonny about his looks and short stature. According to Berman, they "exuded an aura of warmth, playfulness and caring that only enhanced their appeal. Viewers were further enchanted when a young [Chaz] appeared on the show. They seemed like a perfect family." Cher honed her acting skills through comedy sketches, including her original character Laverne LaShinsky, a brash and over-the-top housewife, while her Bob Mackie-designed outfits set 1970s fashion trends.

In 1971, Sonny and Cher signed with the Kapp Records division of MCA Records and Cher released the single "Classified 1A", in which she sings from the point of view of a soldier who bleeds to death in Vietnam. Written by Sonny, who felt that her first solo single on the label had to be poignant and topical, the song was rejected by radio station programmers as uncommercial.

Since Sonny's first attempts at reviving their recording career as a duo had also been unsuccessful, Kapp Records recruited Snuff Garrett to work with them. He produced Cher's second US number-one single, "Gypsys, Tramps & Thieves", which "proved that ... Garrett knew more about Cher's voice and her persona as a singer than Sonny did", wrote Bego. "Gypsys, Tramps & Thieves" was the first single by a solo artist to rank number one on the US Billboard Hot 100 chart at the same time as on the Canadian singles chart. It was featured on the 1971 album Chér (later reissued under the title Gypsys, Tramps & Thieves), which was certified gold by the Recording Industry Association of America (RIAA). Its second single, "The Way of Love", reached number seven on the Billboard Hot 100 chart and established Cher's more confident sound as a recording artist.

In 1972, Cher released the all-ballad album Foxy Lady, demonstrating the evolution of her vocal abilities, according to Bego. Following its release, Garrett quit as producer after disagreeing with Sonny about the kind of material Cher should record. At Sonny's insistence, Cher released the standards album Bittersweet White Light (1973), which was commercially unsuccessful. Later that year, lyricist Mary Dean brought Garrett "Half-Breed", a song about the daughter of a Cherokee mother and a white father, which she had written for Cher. Although no longer working with her, Garrett believed the song was a perfect fit and held onto it until Cher dismissed Sonny as producer and rejoined him. "Half-Breed" became the title track of her 10th studio album and her third US number-one single. Both the album and the single were certified gold by the RIAA.

Cher's next single, "Dark Lady", was released in December 1973 as the lead single from her 11th studio album, Dark Lady (1974). It became her second consecutive and fourth overall number-one on the Billboard Hot 100, tying her with Rosemary Clooney, Patti Page and Connie Francis for the most number-one singles by a female solo artist in US history at the time. (Note: Some sources credit Cher as the female solo artist with the most US Billboard Hot 100 number-one singles by the time she topped the chart with "Dark Lady" in 1974—counting Sonny & Cher's "I Got You Babe" as her first number one. This claim likely stems from Billboard's current rules, which credit a song to a solo artist if their name appears in the official billing. Billboard's reporting in 1974 did not include "I Got You Babe" among Cher's solo number ones, suggesting that the current rules were not in effect at the time.) In 1974, she released a Greatest Hits album that, according to Billboard, proved her to be "one of the most consistent hitmakers of the past five years", as well as a "proven superstar who always sells records".

Between 1971 and 1973, Sonny & Cher's recording career was revived with four albums released under Kapp and MCA Records: Sonny & Cher Live (1971), All I Ever Need Is You (1972)—with the US top-ten singles "All I Ever Need Is You" and "A Cowboy's Work Is Never Done"—Mama Was a Rock and Roll Singer, Papa Used to Write All Her Songs (1973) and Live in Las Vegas Vol. 2 (1973). Cher later commented that her tight schedule required her to record entire albums in a few days while also touring and filming their TV show.

=== 1974–1979: Divorce, marriage to Gregg Allman and media scrutiny ===
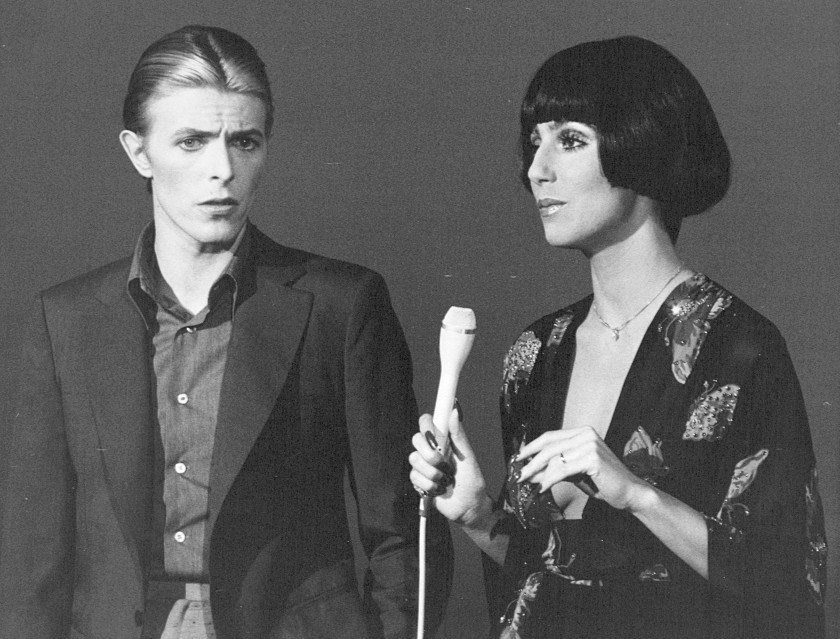
Cher performing with David Bowie (in his American TV debut) on the variety show Cher, 1975

Cher and Sonny ended their relationship in late 1972 but stayed legally married for two more years to protect their careers. Their relationship had been troubled for years due to Sonny's infidelity and controlling behavior. By 1973, they lived in the same house while dating other people. "The public still thinks we are married," Sonny wrote in his diary, "that's the way it has to be."

In January 1974, Cher won the Golden Globe Award for Best Television Actress for The Sonny & Cher Comedy Hour. Sonny filed for separation the next month, citing "irreconcilable differences". A week later, Cher countered with a divorce suit, accusing him of "involuntary servitude" and withholding her rightful share of their earnings. Their show was canceled in April 1974. Later that year, Sonny launched The Sonny Comedy Revue with the same creative team, but it was canceled after 13 weeks.

During divorce proceedings, Cher learned she was legally an employee of Cher Enterprises, a company 95% owned by Sonny and 5% by his lawyer. She was also required to work exclusively for Sonny's company, leaving her with no career or financial control. Record executive David Geffen, with whom Cher had begun a relationship in 1973, helped her break free from the contract. Cher won custody of Chaz after a highly publicized legal battle, and their divorce was finalized on June 26, 1975. Geffen hoped to marry Cher, but she ended the relationship due to his possessiveness and struggles with his sexuality. (Note: According to biographer Tom King, Cher's relationship with David Geffen began when he confided in her about his struggles with his sexual identity and his hope that a relationship with a woman might lead to true love. Moved by his honesty, she entered the relationship while in the final stages of her marriage to Sonny Bono. They planned to marry within a year, but Cher reconsidered due to Geffen's controlling behavior—similar to Sonny's—and his persistent attraction to men. Geffen later came out as gay.)

Cher debuted her solo CBS show, Cher, on February 12, 1975. The show showcased Cher's music, comedy, monologs and an extensive wardrobe—the largest for a weekly TV series. Critics praised it, with the Los Angeles Times stating, "Sonny without Cher was a disaster. Cher without Sonny ... could be the best thing that's happened to weekly television this season." Musical guests included David Bowie (in his American TV debut), Ray Charles, Elton John, Bette Midler, Tina Turner and the Jackson 5, with Billboard crediting Cher for bringing "a rock sensibility to prime-time TV". Despite high ratings, the Cher show ended after two seasons, replaced by a reunion show with Sonny. The Ringer's Lindsay Zoladz commented that network censors were stricter with Cher as a single woman, viewing her as more provocative alone than as Sonny's wife. Cher later reflected, "Doing a show alone was more than I could handle."

In 1975, Cher signed a $2.5 million contract with Warner Bros. Records, aiming to establish herself as a serious rock artist rather than "just a pop singer". Influenced by the introspective style of singer-songwriters such as Joni Mitchell, Carly Simon and James Taylor, she recorded her 12th studio album, Stars (1975). Richard Seeley of the Daily Breeze praised the album as "an important link between the rock and roll subculture and the mass popular music audience", noting that Cher showed "real talent" by choosing lesser-known rock songwriters over "surefire hit makers like John [Lennon] and [Paul] McCartney". In contrast, Janet Maslin of The Village Voice argued that she lacked rock credibility, writing that "image, not music, is Cher Bono's main ingredient for both records and TV." Though Stars was a commercial failure, it later developed a cult following and has been regarded as one of her best works.

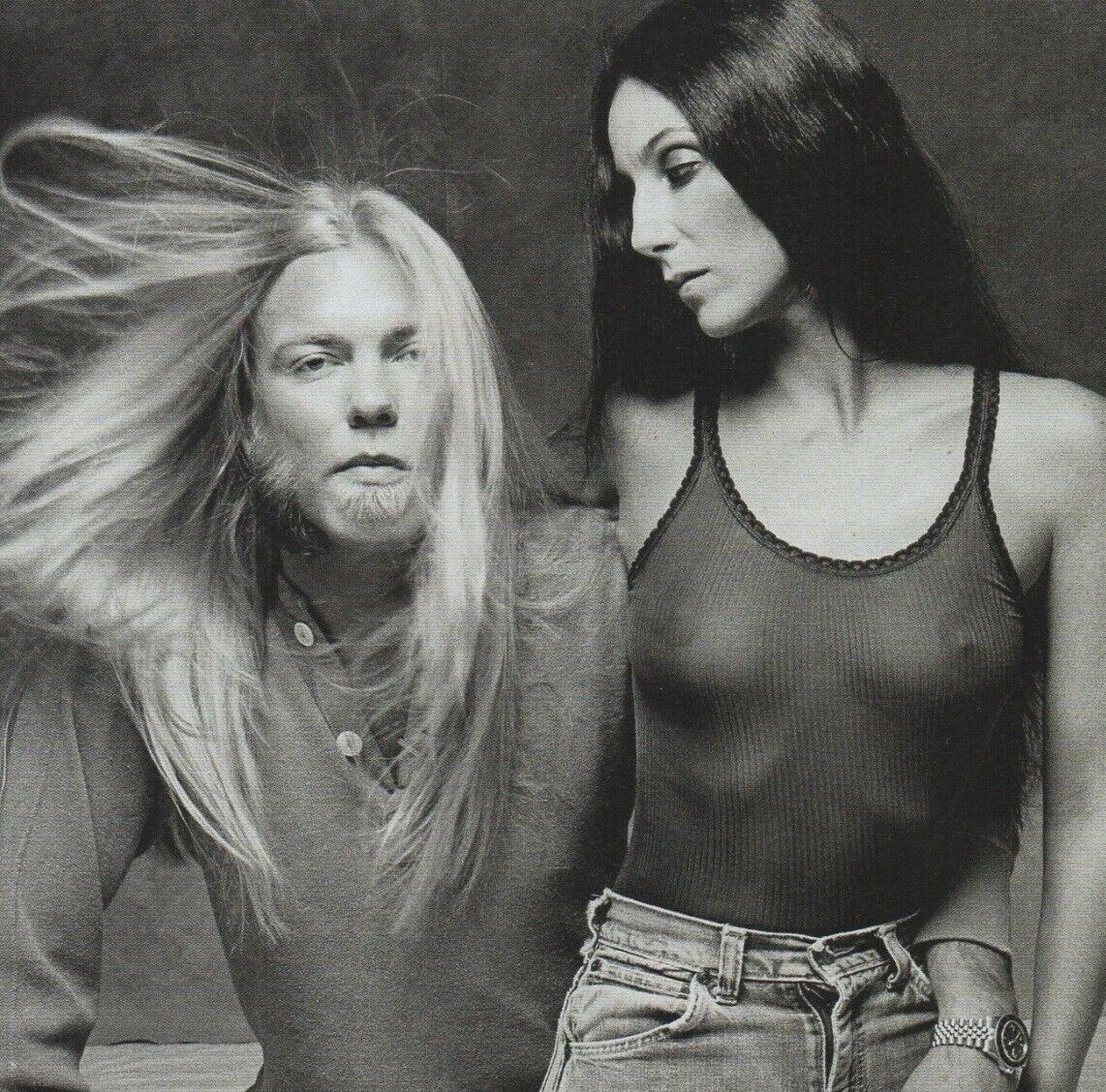
Cher with then-husband Gregg Allman, 1976

On June 30, 1975, four days after finalizing her divorce from Sonny, Cher married rock musician Gregg Allman, co-founder of the Allman Brothers Band, whom she had been dating since January, shortly after ending her relationship with Geffen. She filed for divorce nine days later due to his heroin and alcohol problems, but they reconciled within a month. Their son, Elijah Blue Allman, was born on July 10, 1976. Cher's TV reunion with Sonny, The Sonny and Cher Show, debuted on CBS in February 1976—the first show ever to star a divorced couple. Although it premiered to strong ratings, their biting onscreen banter about the divorce along with her troubled relationship with Allman sparked a public backlash that contributed to the show's cancellation in August 1977.

In 1976, Mego Toys released a line of Sonny & Cher dolls. The Cher doll outsold Barbie, becoming the year's best-selling doll. Under pressure from Warner Records to return to her earlier narrative pop style, Cher recorded her 13th and 14th studio albums, I'd Rather Believe in You (1976) and Cherished (1977), neither of which charted. Orange Coast writer Keith Tuber suggested that her weekly TV shows may have hurt record sales by giving audiences regular access to her music. Reviews were largely negative: Larry Rohter of the Houston Chronicle called I'd Rather Believe in You "atrocious", citing "dreary vocals" and describing it as "one of the lamest records of the year", while Christine Brown of the Miami Herald wrote of Cherished, "It might help to stare at the album cover as you listen ... It takes your mind off what you're hearing."

In order to revitalize her recording career, Cher recorded with Allman the duet album Two the Hard Way (1977), under the rubric Allman and Woman—as suggested by Cher "to focus on the music". Dissatisfied with the result, the record company refused to promote it, which failed to chart. Reviews were critical: Rolling Stone writer Dave Marsh stated that both "aren't really singers at all, but media personalities", arguing that "neither of them has enough voice" for the material, while Greg Oatis of The Toledo Blade wrote that "they match rather well — one's as bad as the other", with the vocals described as a "monumental groaner". The couple toured Europe to support the album, though audience reception was mixed. With a combination of Cher fans and Allman Brothers fans in attendance, fights frequently broke out at venues, prompting Cher to cancel the tour. Their relationship ended soon after the tour's cancellation, and their divorce was finalized in 1979. Cher began a two-year live-in relationship with Kiss member Gene Simmons in 1978. She briefly returned to prime-time TV with the specials Cher... Special (1978)—featuring a segment in which she performs all of the roles in her version of West Side Story—and Cher... and Other Fantasies (1979).

=== 1979–1982: Second musical comeback—from disco diva to rock frontwoman ===
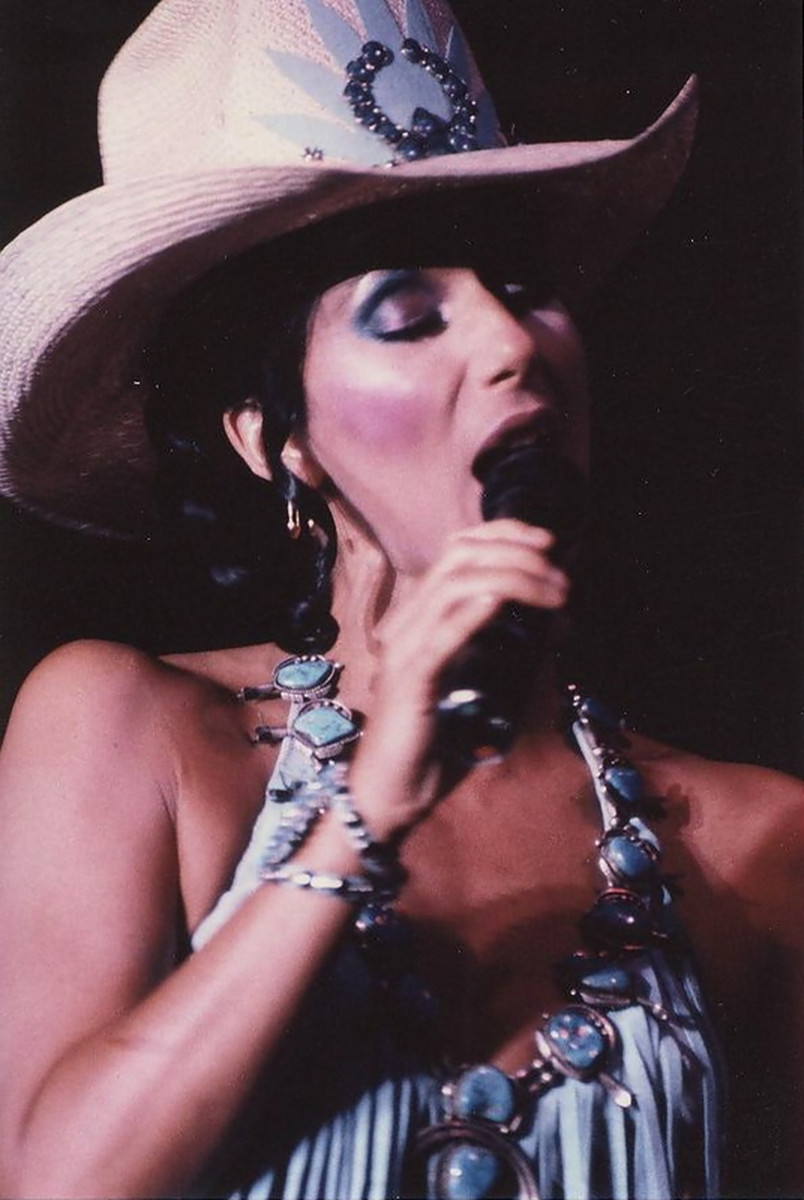
Cher performing on the Take Me Home Tour, 1981

In 1979, she legally adopted the mononym Cher, with no surname. Facing financial pressures as a single mother of two, she decided to steer her singing career toward greater commercial success. Temporarily setting aside her desire to be a rock singer, she signed with Casablanca Records and launched a comeback with the single "Take Me Home" and the album of the same name, both of which capitalized on the disco craze. The album and single became instant successes, remained bestsellers for more than half of 1979 and were certified gold by the RIAA. The album's sales were likely enhanced by the image of a scantily clad Cher in a Viking outfit on its cover.

Encouraged by the popularity of Take Me Home, Cher sought a return to rock with her 16th studio album, Prisoner (1979). The album cover, showing her naked and draped in chains, symbolized her struggle as a "prisoner of the press" amid intense tabloid scrutiny. The imagery drew criticism from feminist groups for her perceived portrayal of a sex slave, while critics found the album's mix of rock and disco tracks inconsistent, contributing to its commercial failure. The single "Hell on Wheels", featured on the soundtrack of the film Roller Boogie (1979), reflected Cher's personal embrace of the late 1970s roller-skating craze, which she had helped popularize. Cher collaborated with Giorgio Moroder to write "Bad Love", her final Casablanca disco track, for the film Foxes (1980).

In 1980, Cher formed the rock band Black Rose with guitarist and then-partner Les Dudek. To blend in and avoid overshadowing the group with her celebrity status, she adopted a punk-inspired look, cutting her signature long hair. Although she was the lead singer, she chose not to take top billing to present the band as equal. Despite TV appearances, the band struggled to book concerts. Their album, Black Rose, received poor reviews; Cher told Rolling Stone that critics "didn't attack the record, they attacked me. It was like, 'How dare Cher sing rock & roll?'" Black Rose disbanded in 1981.

During Black Rose's run, Cher was also performing a residency at Caesars Palace, Las Vegas, with two shows nightly, seven days a week, earning $300,000 weekly. Beginning in June 1979 and running until 1982, the residency evolved into Cher's first solo tour, the Take Me Home Tour, with dates in North America, Europe, South Africa and Australia. (Note: Cher's 1979–1982 concert series had no official name but was promoted under various titles, such as "Cher", "Cher in Concert", "The Cher Show" and "The Cher Tour". It later became known as the Take Me Home Tour, a name adopted by Cher and biographers. The tour had dates in North America, Europe, South Africa and Australia, with extended stays in venues including Caesars Palace in Las Vegas. Though combining elements of both tours and residencies, the media often called it a Vegas residency, referring to shows outside Las Vegas as extensions of her "Vegas act". At the time, Vegas residencies were seen as signs of career decline, influencing public perception and Cher's career choices. Consequently, the concert series is also listed among her residencies.) Described by The Press of Atlantic City as "the biggest cabaret act ever seen on any stage", the concert series yielded two TV specials: Standing Room Only: Cher in Concert (1981) and Cher... A Celebration at Caesars (1983), the latter earning her the CableACE Award for Best Actress in a Variety Program. In 1981, Cher collaborated with Meat Loaf on the duet "Dead Ringer for Love", which peaked at number five on the UK singles chart and was praised by AllMusic's Donald A. Guarisco as "one of the more inspired rock duets of the 1980s". The following year, Cher released the new wave album I Paralyze, a commercial failure and her only album under Columbia Records.

=== 1982–1987: Broadway debut, acting breakthrough and musical hiatus ===
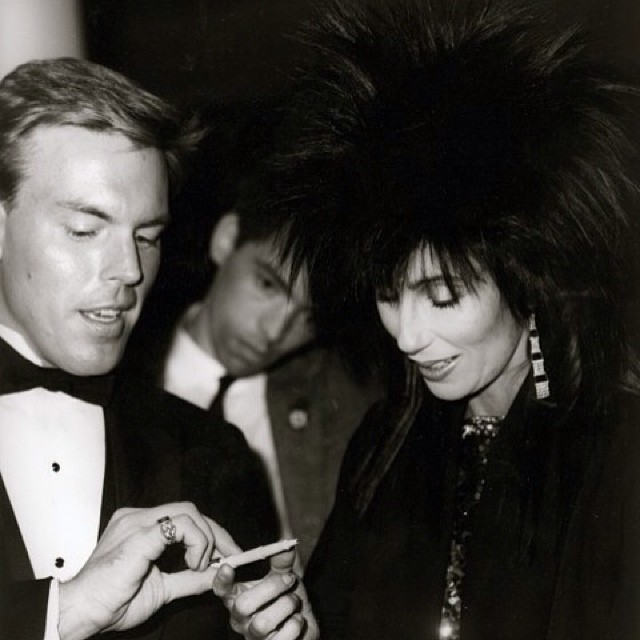
Cher attending an autograph session in New York, 1985

With declining record sales and radio airplay, Cher shifted her focus to acting. Despite earlier aspirations, her only film credits, Good Times and Chastity, were critical and commercial failures, and Hollywood did not take her seriously as an actress. Reflecting on this period, Cher said, "I was dropped by my [label] and couldn't get a job ... [so] I went to Las Vegas", which she likened to an "elephant's graveyard" for fading stars. Despite her success performing there, she felt unfulfilled: "I was making a fortune ... but I was dying inside."

In 1982, Cher moved to New York to study acting with Lee Strasberg at the Actors Studio, but skipped enrollment after auditioning for and being cast in Robert Altman's Broadway production Come Back to the 5 & Dime, Jimmy Dean, Jimmy Dean. Co-starring with Karen Black and Sandy Dennis, she played a James Dean fan club member at a 20-year reunion, earning unexpectedly positive reviews. Frank Rich of The New York Times praised her "cheery, ingratiating nonperformance" as a refreshing contrast in a dull ensemble, suggesting the play needed more of her and less of her co-stars. Altman later cast her in the film adaptation of the same title.

Director Mike Nichols, who had seen Cher onstage in Jimmy Dean, offered her the part of Dolly Pelliker, the lesbian roommate of Karen Silkwood (played by Meryl Streep) in the 1983 biographical film Silkwood. Audiences initially questioned Cher's acting ability; she later recalled attending a film screening where the crowd laughed upon seeing her name in the opening credits. For Silkwood, Cher was nominated for the Academy Award for Best Supporting Actress and won a Golden Globe Award in the same category.

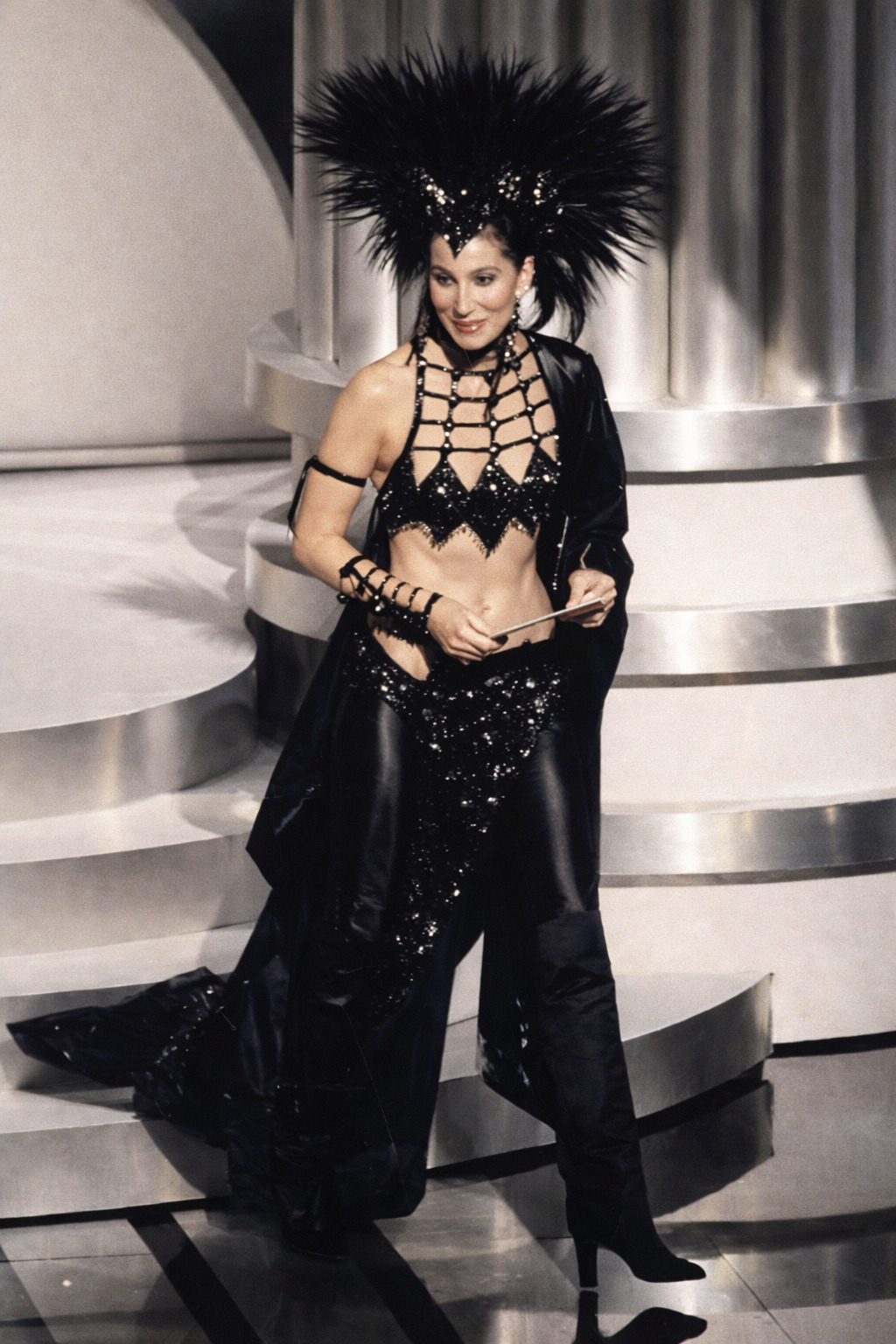
Cher at the 58th Academy Awards in 1986, wearing the "Oscar revenge dress" by Bob Mackie

The biopic Mask (1985) marked Cher's first critical and commercial success as a leading actress, reaching number two at the box office. During production, Cher clashed with director Peter Bogdanovich, refusing to support his call to boycott the film's promotion in protest of Universal Pictures' edits to the final cut. While promoting the film, she remarked, "From working with Peter, it's no surprise to me that he would serve his own interests before those of the film."

For her portrayal of Rusty Dennis, a drug-addicted biker raising a disfigured teenage son, Cher won the Cannes Film Festival Award for Best Actress. Despite critical predictions, she was ultimately left off the Oscar nomination list. Bego suggested that her public feud with Bogdanovich and unconventional image may have contributed to the Academy's decision. At the 58th Academy Awards, she wore a dramatic, tarantula-like outfit, which Vanity Fair's Esther Zuckerman later called Cher's "Oscar revenge dress". Presenting the Best Supporting Actor nominees, Cher quipped, "As you can see, I did receive my Academy booklet on how to dress like a serious actress". The incident garnered her much publicity.

Cher's May 1986 guest appearance on Late Night with David Letterman, during which she called David Letterman "an asshole", attracted much media coverage. Letterman later recalled, "It did hurt my feelings. Cher was one of the few people I've really wanted to have on the show ... I felt like a total fool, especially since I say all kinds of things to people." She returned in November 1987, reuniting with Sonny for the last time before his death for an impromptu performance of "I Got You Babe". Reflecting in 2015, Rolling Stone's Andy Greene wrote, "They weren't exactly the best of friends at this point, but both of them knew it would make for unforgettable television. Had YouTube existed back then, this would have gone insanely viral the next morning." That same month, Cher released The Ugly Duckling, an audiobook adaptation of the 1843 fairy tale. The Washington Post praised her as "a warm, unaffected storyteller" whose voice was "particularly suited for very young listeners".

=== 1987–1992: Hollywood stardom and third musical comeback ===
Cher starred in three films in 1987. In Peter Yates' legal thriller Suspect, she portrayed a public defender aided and romanced by a juror (Dennis Quaid) in a homicide case. In George Miller's comedy horror The Witches of Eastwick, she played one of three small-town divorcees—alongside Michelle Pfeiffer and Susan Sarandon—seduced by a mysterious, wealthy visitor (Jack Nicholson). In Norman Jewison's romantic comedy Moonstruck, she starred as an Italian widow who falls for her fiancé's younger brother (Nicolas Cage). The latter two films ranked among 1987's top 10 highest-grossing movies.

The New York Times' Janet Maslin wrote Moonstruck "offers further proof that Cher has evolved into the kind of larger-than-life movie star who's worth watching whatever she does". For that film, Cher won the Academy Award for Best Actress and the Golden Globe Award for Best Actress in a Musical or Comedy. By 1988, Cher had become one of the most bankable actresses of the decade, commanding $1 million per film. That year, she released the fragrance Uninhibited, which earned about $15 million in its first year sales.

By the late 1980s, Cher had developed a reputation for her exhibitionist fashion, plastic surgeries and relationships with younger men. She dated actors Val Kilmer, Eric Stoltz and Tom Cruise, Bon Jovi guitarist Richie Sambora, hockey player Ron Duguay, film producer Joshua Donen and Rob Camilletti, a baker 18 years her junior—dubbed the "Bagel Boy" by the media—whom she was with from 1986 to 1989.

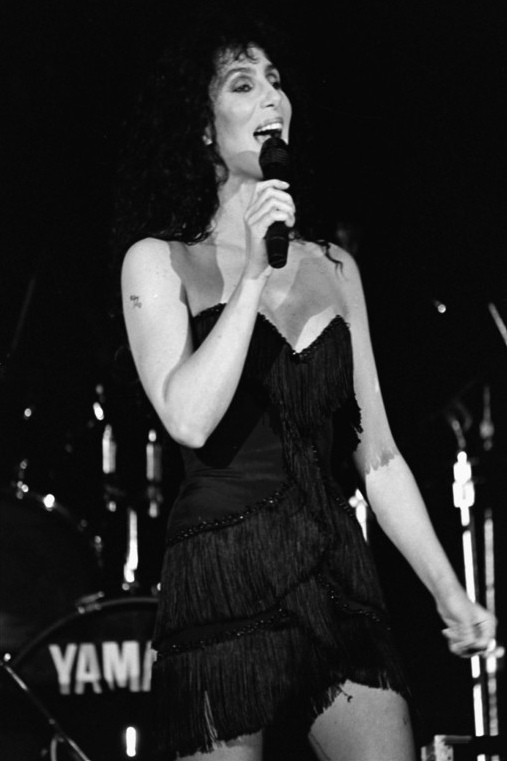
Cher performing during a benefit concert for Elizabeth Glaser Pediatric AIDS Foundation, 1989

In 1987, Cher signed with Geffen Records and revived her musical career with what music critics Johnny Danza and Dean Ferguson described as "her most impressive string of hits to date", establishing her as a "serious rock and roller ... a crown that she'd worked long and hard to capture". Jon Bon Jovi, Michael Bolton, Richie Sambora and Desmond Child produced her first Geffen album, Cher. Despite facing strong retail and radio airplay resistance upon its release, the album proved to be a commercial success, certified platinum by the RIAA. Cher features the hair metal power ballad "I Found Someone", her first US top-ten single in eight years.

Cher won the Favorite All-Around Female Star Award at the 1989 People's Choice Awards. Her 19th studio album, Heart of Stone (1989), reached number one in Australia and entered the top 10 in Canada, New Zealand, the UK and the US, where it was certified triple platinum. The album yielded three US top-ten singles: "After All" (with Peter Cetera), "Just Like Jesse James" and "If I Could Turn Back Time". The latter spent seven weeks at number one in Australia, became one of her signature songs and drew controversy for its sexually suggestive music video, filmed aboard the battleship USS Missouri. Cher launched the Heart of Stone Tour in 1989, which continued through 1990. Critics praised the tour for its nostalgic appeal and her showmanship. The TV special Cher... at the Mirage, filmed during a Las Vegas concert, aired in February 1991.

In Mermaids (1990), Cher's first film in three years, she drew inspiration from her mother to portray a woman who moves her daughters (Winona Ryder, Christina Ricci) from town to town after failed relationships. She clashed with the film's first two directors, Lasse Hallström and Frank Oz, who were replaced by Richard Benjamin. Producers, seeing Cher as the star attraction, granted her creative control. The film was a box office success and received positive reviews. One of the two songs Cher recorded for the film's soundtrack, a cover of Merry Clayton's "The Shoop Shoop Song (It's in His Kiss)", topped the UK singles chart for five consecutive weeks; it became the year's best-selling single by a female artist.

Cher's final Geffen studio album, Love Hurts (1991), spent six consecutive weeks at number one in the UK, becoming the year's best-selling studio album by a female artist. In the US, was less commercially successful, peaking at number 48 on the Billboard 200 and was certified gold by the RIAA. It produced the UK top-ten single "Love and Understanding". Writing for Entertainment Weekly, Jim Farber praised Cher's "sexually autonomous persona" as "one of the surest of any pop female", noting how she turned heartbreak lyrics into expressions of revenge rather than victimhood. She then launched the Love Hurts Tour (1991–1992) and released the UK-only compilation album Greatest Hits: 1965–1992 (1992), which topped the UK Albums Chart for seven weeks, becoming her second consecutive million-seller in the country and the year's best-selling album by a female artist. She also capitalized on public interest in her youthful looks with the wellness book Forever Fit (1991) and the exercise videos CherFitness: A New Attitude (1991) and CherFitness: Body Confidence (1992).

=== 1992–1998: From A-list actress to "Infomercial Queen"; death of Sonny Bono ===
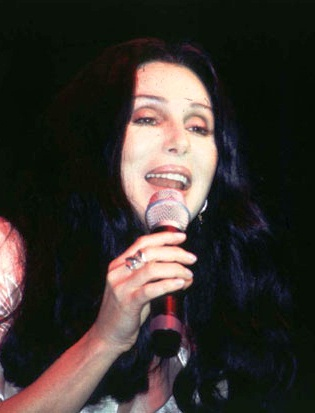
Cher performing in New York, 1996

In the early 1990s, Cher contracted the Epstein–Barr virus and developed myalgic encephalomyelitis/chronic fatigue syndrome, leaving her too exhausted for music or film projects. She declined leading roles in Thelma & Louise and The War of the Roses. Her next film appearances were cameos in Robert Altman's The Player (1992) and Prêt-à-Porter (1994). To generate income, she appeared in infomercials for health, beauty and diet products, earning nearly $10 million. Critics saw it as a sellout and speculated her film career was over, with Entertainment Weekly stating she had eroded her "hard-won A-list actress status". The ads were parodied on Saturday Night Live and referenced in Clueless (1995), where protagonist Cher Horowitz jokes she was named after a "great [singer] of the past who now does infomercials". Cher later reflected, "Suddenly I became the Infomercial Queen ... people stripped me of all my other things."

In 1993, Cher re-recorded "I Got You Babe" with MTV's animated duo Beavis and Butt-Head, mocking her own image as they introduce her as "a chick that's got tattoos on her butt ... who's older ... done it a lot of times [and] used to be married to some dork" (referring to Sonny Bono). She topped the UK singles chart in 1995 with the charity single "Love Can Build a Bridge", alongside Chrissie Hynde, Neneh Cherry and Eric Clapton. After signing with Warner Music UK's WEA label, Cher released It's a Man's World (1995), an album of songs originally performed by men. Critics praised its R&B influences and Cher's vocal growth, with Stephen Holden of The New York Times calling it a "soulful collection of grown-up pop songs". The album features "Walking in Memphis", certified silver by the British Phonographic Industry (BPI), and the UK top-ten single "One by One". Man's World reached the top 10 in Austria and the UK. A remixed US version, shifting from rock to a more radio-friendly sound, was commercially unsuccessful, peaking at number 64 on the Billboard 200.

In 1996, Cher appeared alongside Demi Moore and Sissy Spacek in If These Walls Could Talk, a three-part anthology TV film about abortion. The project marked Cher's directorial debut, as she both directed and starred in the film's final segment, playing a doctor targeted by an anti-abortion group. Walls became HBO's highest-rated original movie to date, drawing 6.9 million viewers. Cher's first leading role in a theatrical release in six years came with Paul Mazursky's dark comedy Faithful (1996), in which she played a suicidal woman whose husband hires a hitman (Chazz Palminteri) to kill her. Although praised for her performance, with The New York Times noting she "does her game best to find comic potential in a victim's role", Cher refused to promote the film, calling it "horrible". Faithful was both a critical failure and a box-office bomb, grossing $2 million.

Following Sonny Bono's death in a skiing accident in 1998, Cher delivered a tearful eulogy at his funeral, calling him "the most unforgettable character" she had met. She paid tribute to him by hosting the CBS special Sonny & Me: Cher Remembers, which aired on May 20, 1998. That month, Sonny and Cher received a star on the Hollywood Walk of Fame for their work on television. Later that year, Cher published The First Time, a collection of autobiographical essays of "first-time" events in her life. Critics praised the book as sincere and relatable. The manuscript was nearly complete when Sonny died, and Cher was initially reluctant to include his death, concerned it might appear exploitative. She told Rolling Stone, "I might have [ignored it] if I cared more about what people think than what I know is right for me."

=== 1998–2002: Fourth musical comeback and songwriting debut ===
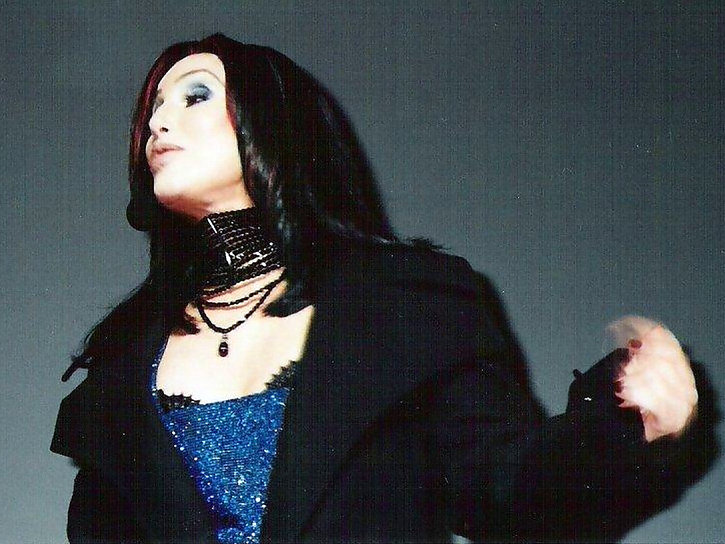
Cher performing "Believe" during WKTU's Miracle on 34th Street concert, 1998

Cher's 22nd studio album, Believe (1998), marked a shift from her previous rock sound to 1970s disco-inspired dance-pop. It sold 11 million copies worldwide, earning quadruple platinum certification in the US and gold, platinum or multi-platinum status in 39 countries. Entertainment Weekly described the album as "the most dramatic comeback Hollywood has seen", emphasizing its role in introducing her to a new generation of fans who "hadn't yet been born when 'I Got You Babe' ruled the charts in 1965".

The album's title track reached number one in 23 countries and sold over 10 million copies globally. It was the best-selling single of 1998 in the UK and of 1999 in the US. "Believe" debuted at number one in the UK, held the position for seven weeks and became the country's best-selling single by a female artist. In the US, it led the Billboard Hot 100 for four weeks, making Cher, at 52, the oldest woman to top the chart. (Note: Cher's record as the oldest woman to top the US Billboard Hot 100 was surpassed by Mariah Carey, who was 53 when "All I Want for Christmas Is You" (1994) reached number one in December 2023, and Brenda Lee, who was 78 when "Rockin' Around the Christmas Tree" (1958) topped the chart that same month. Her record on the UK singles chart was surpassed by Kate Bush, who was 63 when "Running Up That Hill" (1985) reached number one in June 2022. Excluding catalog songs, Cher remains the oldest female artist to top both charts.) Pitchfork wrote that "coming from Cher—a confident, charismatic, and massively talented woman who'd been subjected to frequent public ridicule over her personal life—'Believe' took on an extra survivalist edge".

"Believe" won the Grammy Award for Best Dance Recording and the 1999 Billboard Music Award for Hot 100 Single of the Year. The album's second single, "Strong Enough", reached number one in Hungary and entered the top five in Austria, Belgium, France, Germany, Iceland, Poland, Scotland, Spain, Switzerland and the UK, where it was certified platinum by the BPI. In 1999, Cher starred in Franco Zeffirelli's critically acclaimed war film Tea with Mussolini, playing a flamboyant American socialite unwelcome among Englishwomen (Judi Dench, Maggie Smith) in Italy. Lisa Schwarzbaum of Entertainment Weekly described her performance as "always likable, always soft-focus, always strange", while Film Comment wrote that she proved "how sorely she's been missed from movie screens".

On January 31, 1999, Cher sang "The Star-Spangled Banner", the US national anthem, at the Super Bowl XXXIII. She co-headlined the TV special VH1 Divas Live '99, which drew 19.4 million viewers and became the highest-rated program in VH1's history at the time. Her Do You Believe? Tour (1999–2000) sold out in every American city it visited, drawing a global audience of over 1.5 million. The tour's TV special, Cher: Live in Concert – From the MGM Grand in Las Vegas (1999), became HBO's top-rated original program of 1998–1999. Billboard named Cher the top dance artist of 1999. Capitalizing on her success, former label Geffen released the US-only compilation If I Could Turn Back Time: Cher's Greatest Hits (1999), certified gold by the RIAA. Meanwhile, Cher oversaw The Greatest Hits (1999) for international markets, reaching number one on the European Top 100 Albums chart.

In 2000, Cher released Not Commercial, largely self-written during a songwriting camp in 1994 and recorded with members of David Letterman's CBS Orchestra. She chose the title after her label's chief dismissed the project as "nice, but not commercial" and rejected it for its explicit language and unsparing themes, including the suicide of Kurt Cobain, homelessness, veteran neglect and personal trauma. She sold it independently on her website, an unusual move for an artist under contract with a major label. The song "Sisters of Mercy", which describes the nuns who prevented her mother from retrieving her from a Catholic orphanage as "daughters of hell", drew condemnation from the Catholic Church.

Cher's dance-focused follow-up to Believe, Living Proof (2001), reached number one in Greece and number nine in the US, where it was certified gold. It features the UK top-ten single "The Music's No Good Without You", the Grammy-nominated "Love One Another" and "Song for the Lonely", a tribute to "the courageous people of New York" after the September 11 attacks. Named Billboard's top dance artist of 2002, Cher received the Artist Achievement Award from Steven Tyler at the 2002 Billboard Music Awards for having "helped redefine popular music with massive success on the Billboard charts". That year, her wealth was estimated at $600 million.

=== 2002–2015: Farewell tours, musical film comeback and return to dance-pop ===
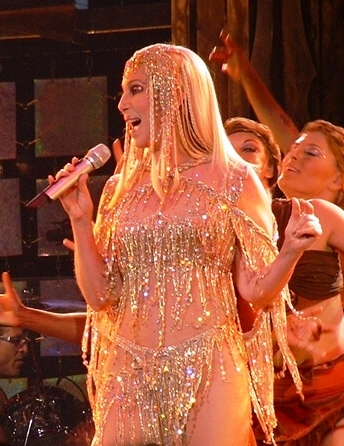
Cher on Living Proof: The Farewell Tour (2002–2005), then the highest-grossing tour by a female artist

In June 2002, Cher launched Living Proof: The Farewell Tour, promoted as her final concert tour, though she planned to keep recording and acting. Jon Pareles of The New York Times praised it as a celebration of Cher's resilience, highlighting her ability to "triumph over restraint, aging and gravity" and calling her "a hit machine immune to sagging flesh". Initially set for 49 shows, the tour was repeatedly extended. By October 2003, it had become the most successful tour by a female artist, grossing $145 million from 200 shows with 2.2 million attendees. The NBC special Cher: The Farewell Tour drew 17 million viewers, becoming the highest-rated network concert special of 2003 and earning Cher the Primetime Emmy Award for Outstanding Variety, Music or Comedy Special.

After leaving Warner UK in 2002, Cher signed a global deal with Warner Bros. Records in September 2003. Forbes named her the highest-paid female musician of 2003, earning $33.1 million. The compilation album The Very Best of Cher (2003) peaked at number four on the Billboard 200 and was certified triple platinum by the RIAA. In the Farrelly brothers' comedy Stuck on You (2003), she played a satirical version of herself in a relationship with a high schooler (Frankie Muniz), referencing media scrutiny of her relationships with younger men.

Cher's Farewell Tour concluded in April 2005 after 325 shows, drawing over 3.5 million attendees and grossing $250 million, ranking among the top-ten highest-grossing tours of the 2000s. After three years of retirement, she signed a $60 million deal for a 200-show residency at the Colosseum at Caesars Palace in Las Vegas. Titled Cher (2008–2011), the production featured advanced stage effects and over 20 costume changes.

Cher returned to film in Burlesque (2010)—her first musical since Good Times (1967)—playing an intimidating nightclub owner who mentors an aspiring performer (Christina Aguilera). Initially met with mixed reviews and modest box office results, the film was later reassessed; Entertainment Weekly called it "a campy, niche classic [that] inspired everything, from drag queen revues to viral internet moments". Her ballad "You Haven't Seen the Last of Me", from the soundtrack, topped the Billboard Dance Club Songs chart in January 2011, making her the only artist with Billboard number-one singles in six consecutive decades (1960s–2010s).

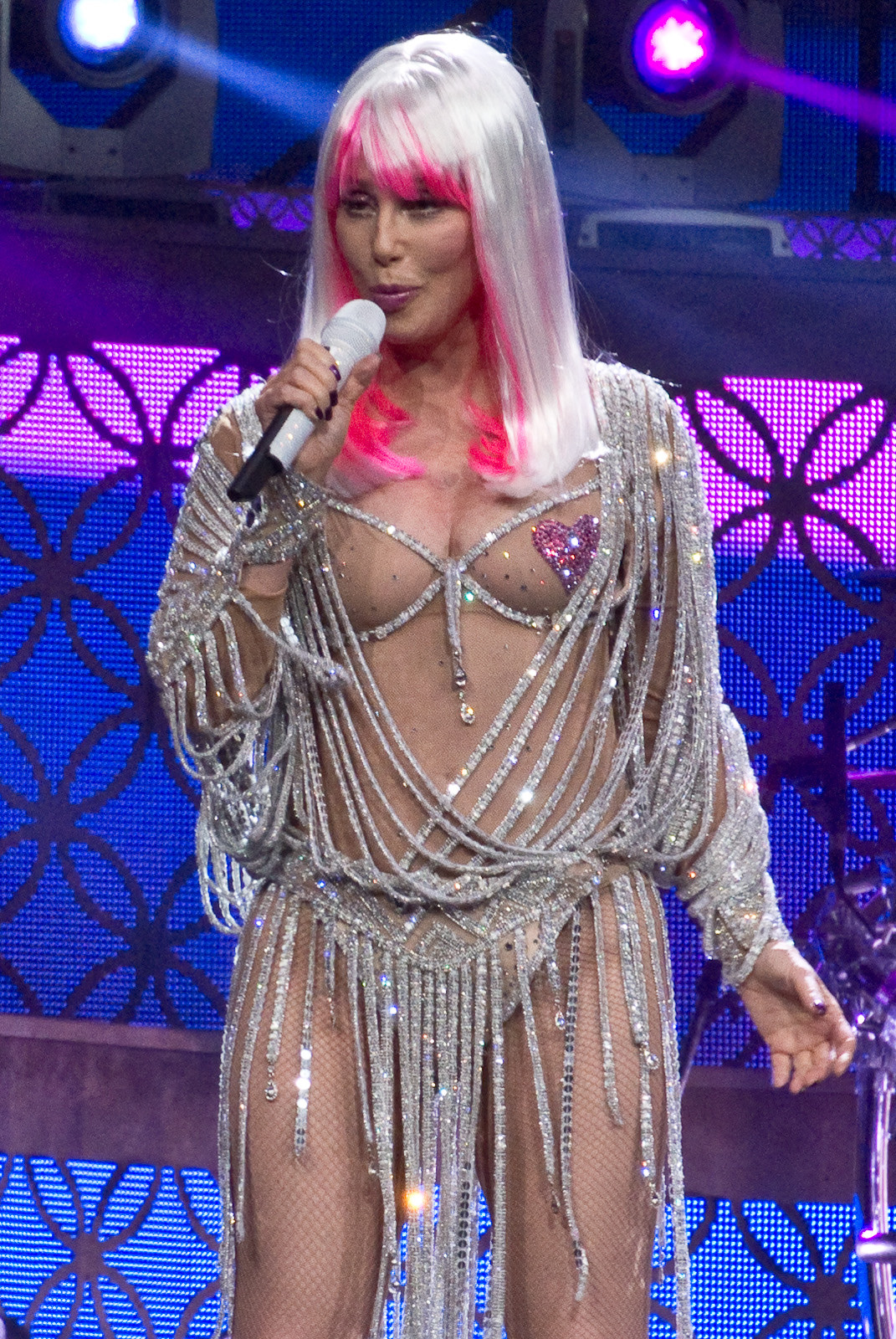
Cher performing on the Dressed to Kill Tour, 2014

After voicing Janet the Lioness in Zookeeper (2011), she produced the documentary Dear Mom, Love Cher (2013). It follows her efforts to support her mother Georgia Holt's dream of becoming a singer, culminating in the release of Holt's debut album at age 87.

Closer to the Truth (2013), Cher's first studio album since 2001's Living Proof, debuted at number three on the Billboard 200—her highest position on that chart to date—and reached the top 10 in Canada, Germany, Scotland and the UK. The Boston Globe wrote that "Cher's 'Goddess of Pop' sash remains in little danger of undue snatching; at 67, she sounds more convincing than J-Lo or Madonna reporting from 'the club'". She premiered the lead single "Woman's World" during the season four finale of The Voice—her first live TV performance in over a decade—and returned in season five as team adviser to judge Blake Shelton.

In June 2013, Cher headlined the annual Dance on the Pier benefit, celebrating LGBTQ Pride Day, achieving the event's first full-capacity crowd in five years. She embarked on the Dressed to Kill Tour in March 2014, over a decade after announcing her "farewell tour", joking during shows that this would be her last farewell tour while crossing fingers. The tour's first leg, comprising 49 sold-out shows in North America, grossed $54.9 million. Later that year, she canceled all remaining dates due to a kidney infection. Cher collaborated with American hip-hop group Wu-Tang Clan on their 2015 album Once Upon a Time in Shaolin, credited under her 1964 alias, Bonnie Jo Mason. The album, produced as a single copy and sold via online auction, became the most expensive album ever sold.

=== 2015–2022: ABBA-inspired projects and fashion ventures ===
Classic Cher, a three-year concert residency at the Park Theater in Las Vegas and The Theater at MGM National Harbor in Washington, D.C., began in February 2017. At the 2017 Billboard Music Awards, Cher performed "Believe" and "If I Could Turn Back Time", her first awards show performance in over 15 years. Gwen Stefani presented Cher with the Billboard Icon Award, calling her the "definition of the word Icon" and a role model of strength and authenticity. In March 2018, Cher headlined the 40th Sydney Gay and Lesbian Mardi Gras, with tickets selling out in three hours after she hinted at her involvement on Twitter.

Cher returned to film after nearly a decade in Mamma Mia! Here We Go Again (2018), a jukebox musical romantic comedy based on the songs of ABBA. Serving as both a prequel and a sequel to the 2008 film Mamma Mia!, it features Cher as Ruby Sheridan, the grandmother of Sophie (Amanda Seyfried) and mother of Donna (Meryl Streep). Director Ol Parker addressed casting Cher as Streep's mother despite their three-year age difference by stating, "Cher exists outside of time." Critics highlighted her performance as a standout, with Vulture remarking, "Every single movie ... would be infinitely better if it included Cher." For the soundtrack, she recorded two ABBA songs, "Fernando" and "Super Trouper". Björn Ulvaeus of ABBA commented, "She makes 'Fernando' her own. It's her song now."

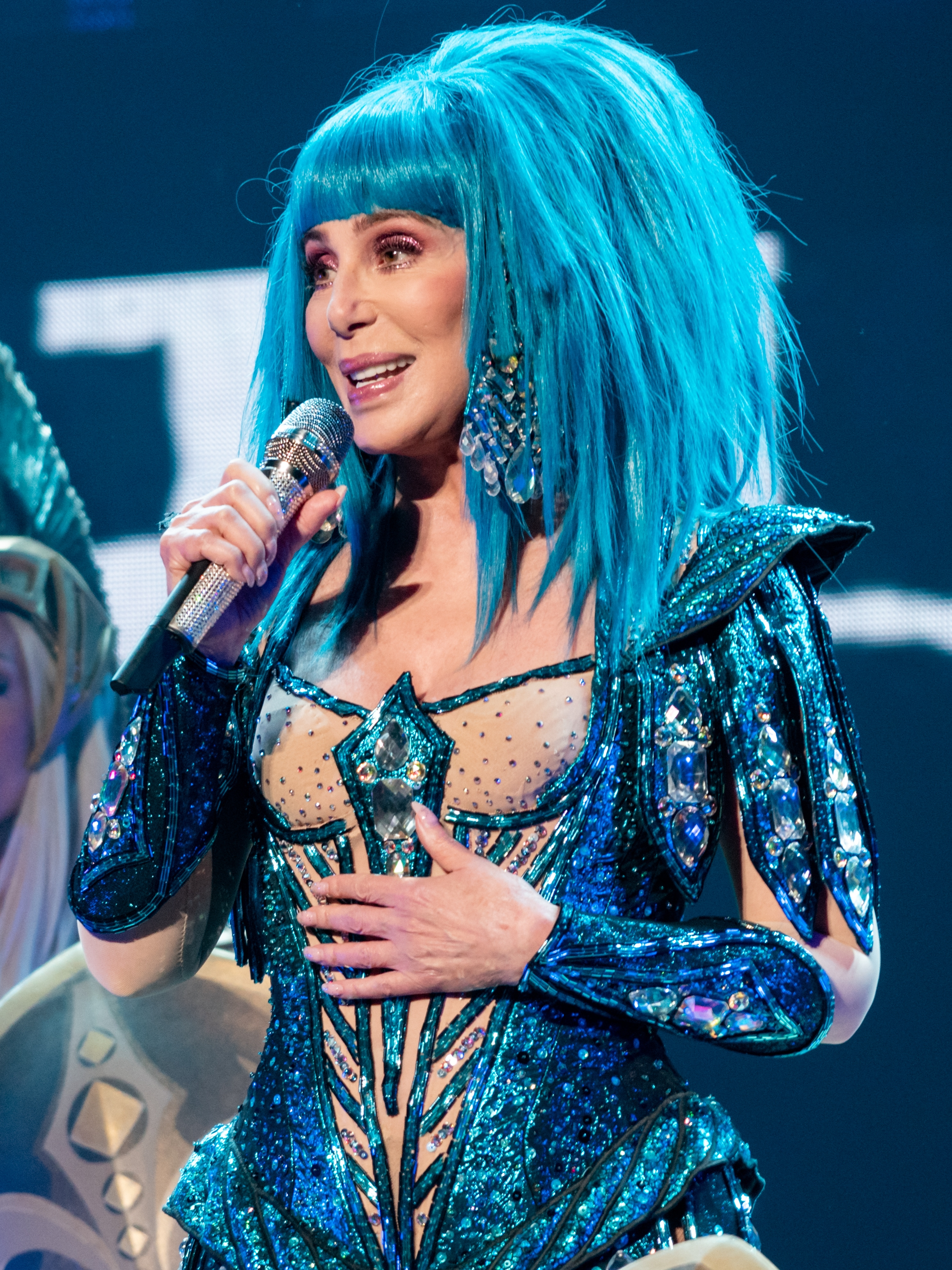
Cher performing on the Here We Go Again Tour, 2019

While promoting Mamma Mia! Here We Go Again, Cher announced that she was recording an album of ABBA covers. Her 26th studio album, Dancing Queen (2018), debuted at number three on the Billboard 200, tying with 2013's Closer to the Truth as her highest-charting solo album in the US. With first-week sales of 153,000 units, it achieved the year's largest sales week for a pop album by a female artist. Dancing Queen received widespread critical acclaim; Rolling Stone wrote that Cher makes the ABBA songs sound as if they were written for her, and Entertainment Weekly called it her "most significant release since 1998's Believe".

Cher's Here We Go Again Tour ran from 2018 until its indefinite postponement in 2020 due to the COVID-19 lockdowns. Rolling Stone deemed the tour proof that Cher "can wipe the floor with any pop star from any generation". The Cher Show, a jukebox musical with three actresses playing Cher at different stages of her life, premiered in Chicago in June 2018 and ran on Broadway from December 2018 to August 2019, later touring the UK, Ireland and the US. On December 2, 2018, Whoopi Goldberg presented Cher with the Kennedy Center Honors for her "extraordinary contributions to culture", with tribute performances by Adam Lambert, Cyndi Lauper and Little Big Town. In 2019, she launched Cher Eau de Couture, a "genderless" follow-up to her 1988 fragrance Uninhibited. During the COVID-19 pandemic in 2020, Cher focused on projects that could be completed from home. In May, she released her first Spanish-language song, a cover of ABBA's "Chiquitita", with proceeds donated to UNICEF. Later that year, she voiced a bobblehead version of herself in Bobbleheads: The Movie and joined the charity supergroup BBC Radio 2 Allstars for a cover of Oasis' "Stop Crying Your Heart Out". The recording, made in support of the Children in Need charity, became a UK top-ten single.

In the late 2010s and early 2020s, Cher collaborated with major fashion brands. After attending the 2015 Met Gala as Marc Jacobs' guest, Cher became the face of his Fall/Winter campaign. She then starred alongside rapper Future in Gap's Fall 2017 campaign, followed by Dsquared2's Spring/Summer 2020 campaign, MAC Cosmetics' "Challenge Accepted" campaign in January 2022 and UGG's "Feel" campaign the same month. For Pride Month in June 2022, Cher partnered with Versace to launch the "Chersace" capsule collection, with proceeds benefiting the LGBTQIA+ charity Gender Spectrum. In September 2022, she walked the runway at Paris Fashion Week, closing Balmain's Spring/Summer 2023 show, and in November, she starred in the brand's "Balmain Blaze" campaign. That month, Cher confirmed she was dating music executive Alexander Edwards, 40 years her junior. Their age gap sparked criticism online, which she addressed by tweeting, "Love doesn't know math." Cher's mother, Georgia Holt, died in December 2022 at the age of 96.

=== 2023–present: Christmas album, Rock Hall induction and memoirs ===
Cher's first holiday album, Christmas (2023), features duets with Cyndi Lauper, Stevie Wonder, Michael Bublé, Darlene Love and rapper Tyga. It reached number one on the Billboard Top Holiday Albums chart, as well as the top 10 in Austria, Germany, Scotland and the UK. The album's lead single, "DJ Play a Christmas Song", topped the Billboard Adult Contemporary and Dance/Electronic Digital Song Sales charts in December 2023, extending Cher's record as the only solo artist with Billboard number-one singles in seven consecutive decades (1960s–2020s).

In December 2023, Cher criticized the Rock and Roll Hall of Fame for excluding her since becoming eligible in 1990, saying, "I wouldn't be in it now if they gave me a million dollars", and suggesting the institution "can just you-know-what themselves". She received her first nomination two months later and was inducted on October 19, 2024, becoming the first performer to have won an Academy Award for acting and been inducted into the Rock and Roll Hall of Fame. Cher decided to accept the honor out of admiration for her fellow inductees. At the ceremony, she performed "If I Could Turn Back Time" and "Believe", the latter as a duet with Dua Lipa.

In May 2024, Cher won a legal dispute against Mary Bono, the widow of Sonny Bono, over royalties from her recordings with him. Under a 1978 divorce settlement, Cher was entitled to half the publishing revenue, but Mary Bono stopped payments in 2021 after invoking a copyright termination clause. A federal judge ruled that the royalties were a separate contractual obligation and ordered her to pay Cher around $418,000 in withheld earnings. In September, Cher withdrew a conservatorship petition over her son Elijah, originally filed in December 2023 due to concerns about his ongoing substance abuse. The court had earlier denied her requests for temporary control, citing Elijah's demonstrated ability to manage his affairs. The matter was resolved privately.

To celebrate 60 years in music, Cher released the compilation album Forever (2024), available as a 21-track standard edition and a 40-track digital edition, Forever Fan, featuring Sonny & Cher songs and lesser-known tracks curated by Cher. Rolling Stone noted the absence of "Half-Breed", her third Billboard Hot 100 number-one, linking it to a trend of artists reevaluating their catalogs in light of changing cultural sensitivities. In November 2024, she published Cher: The Memoir, the first of a two-part autobiography covering her childhood and early career. Written over seven years, it debuted at number one on The New York Times Best Seller list, holding the position for three weeks.

On November 18, 2026, it was announced that Cher would be headlining the Glastonbury Festival in June 2027.

== Artistry ==
=== Influences ===
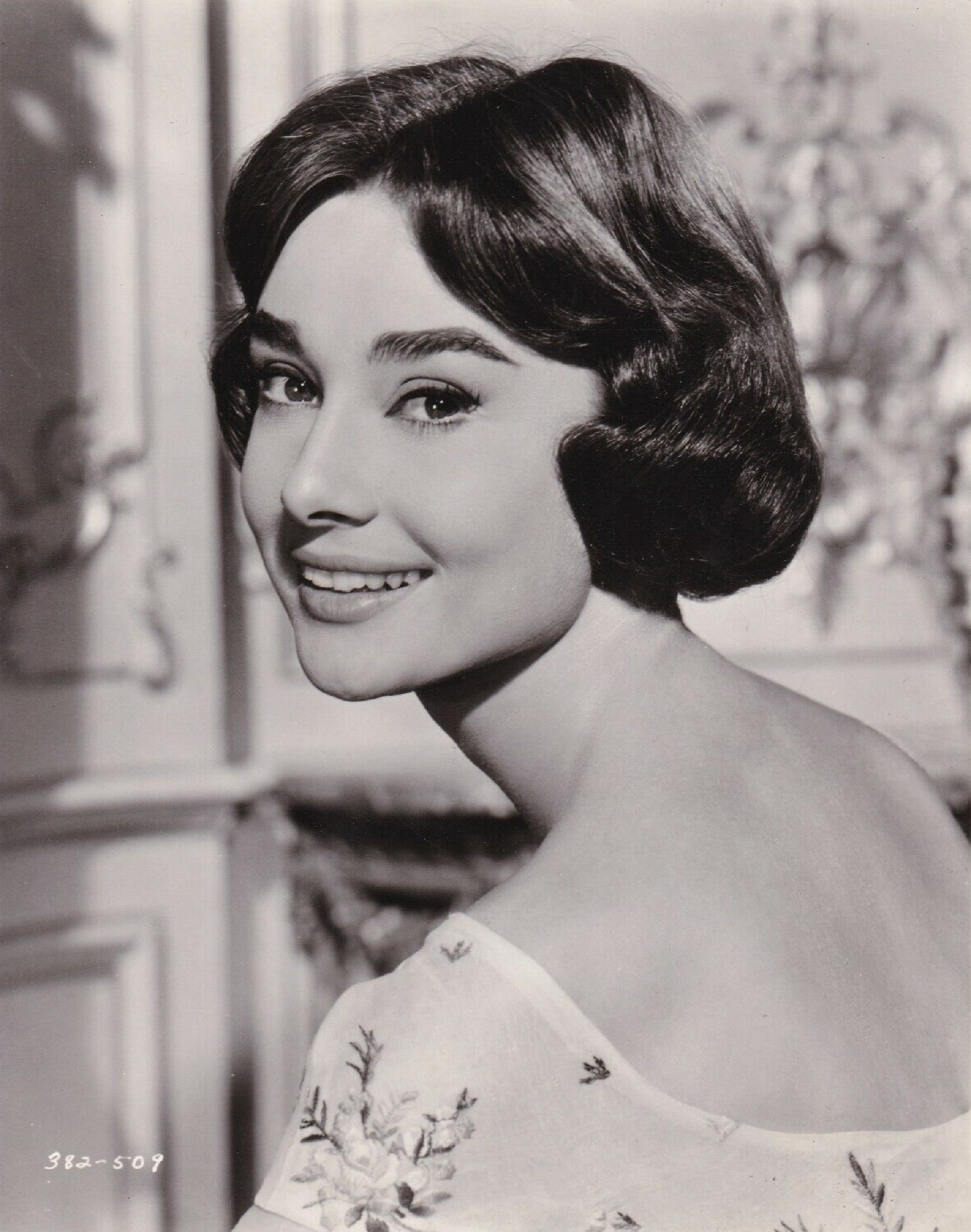
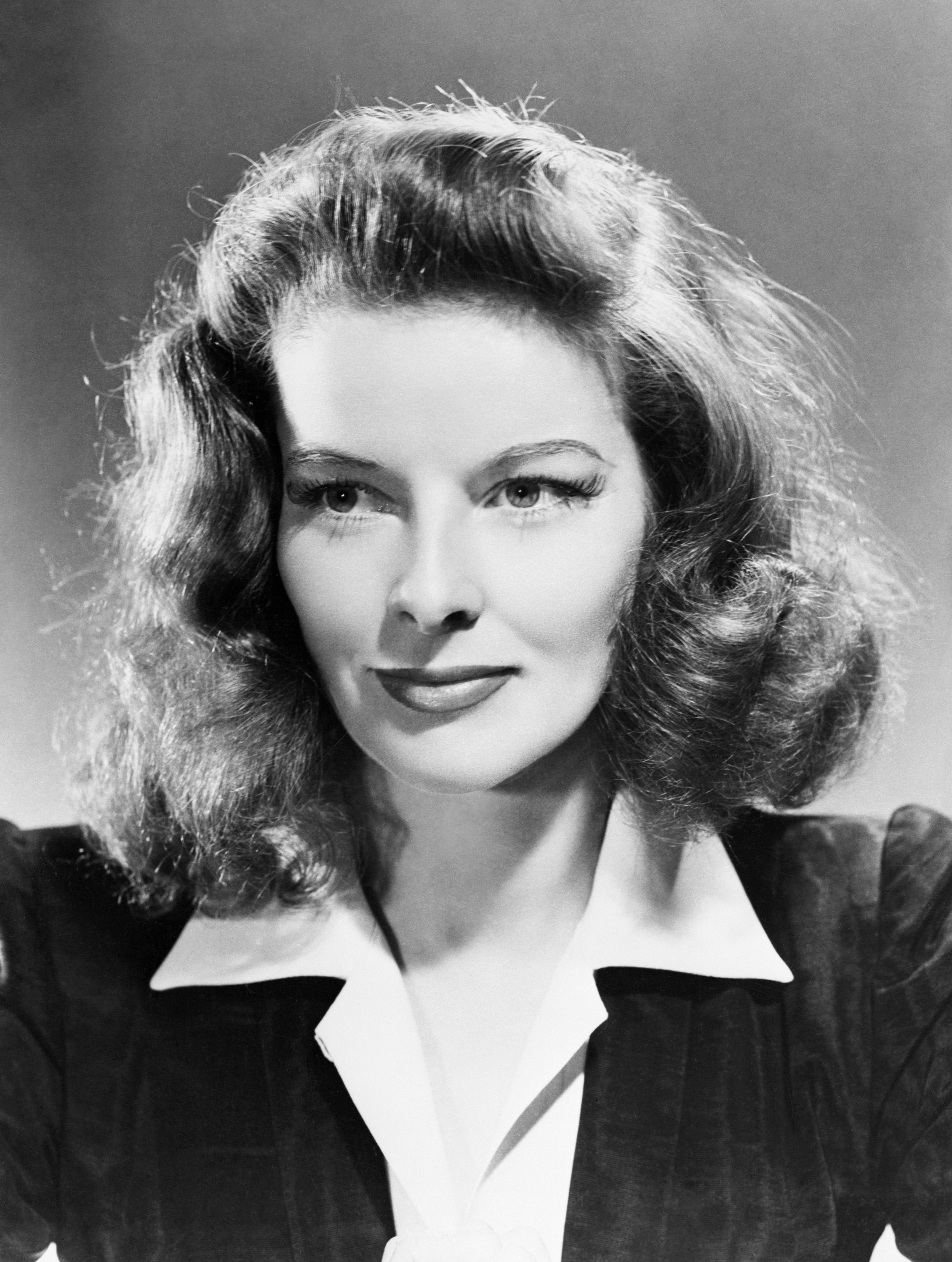
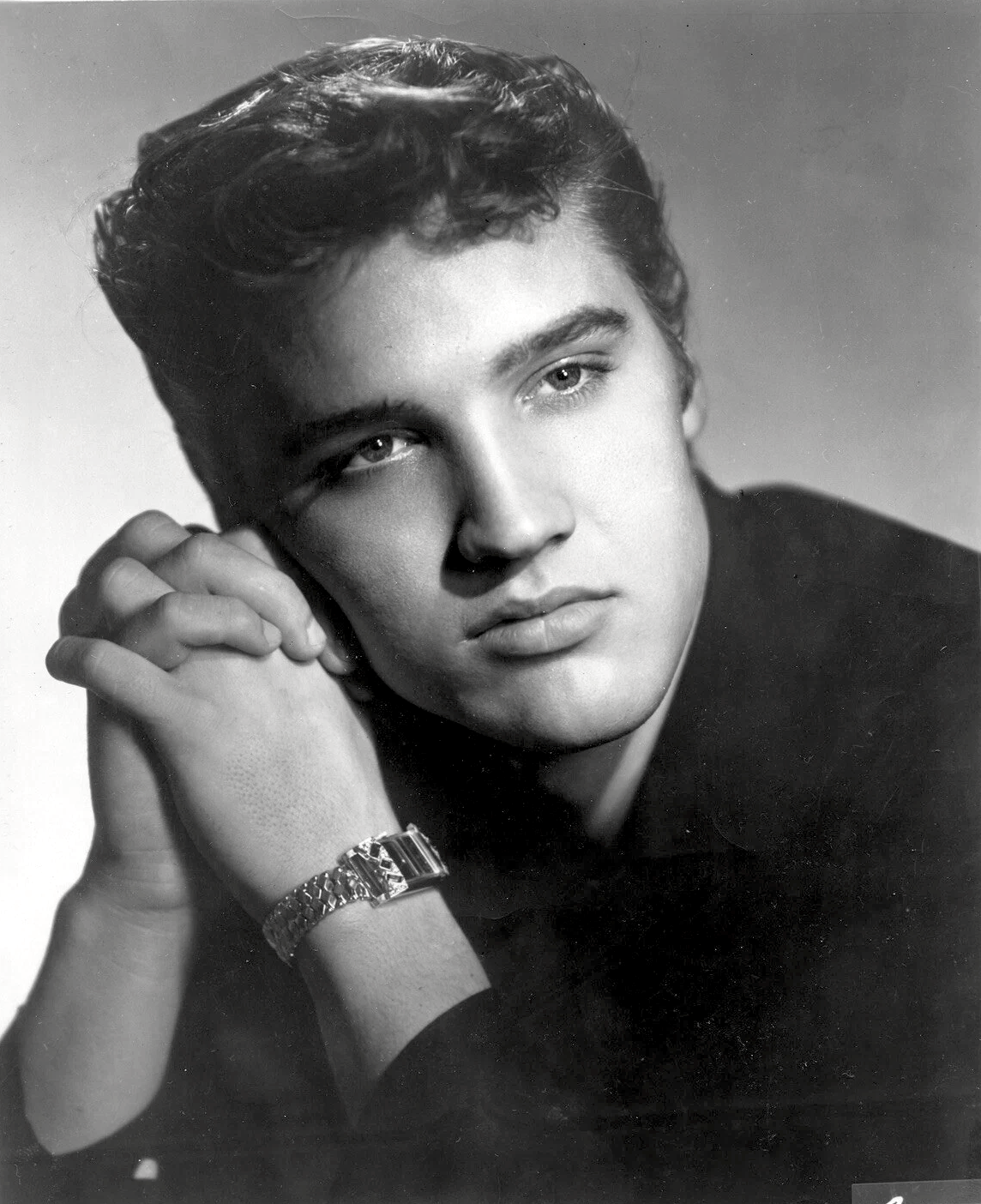
Cher has been inspired by film stars such as Audrey Hepburn (left) and Katharine Hepburn (center), and singers like Elvis Presley (right).

As a young child, Cher has been inspired to pursue a career in show business by watching Walt Disney's classic animated films Dumbo (1941) and Cinderella (1950). Captivated by the magic on screen, she realized at a very early age that she wanted to be a part of that world, later reflecting that these specific Disney movies represent a pivotal moment for her. Fascinated by film stars, as a young woman, she drew inspiration from Hollywood actresses; she idolized Audrey Hepburn, particularly in Breakfast at Tiffany's (1961), emulating Hepburn's character's unconventional outfits and demeanor. She also admired Marlene Dietrich, Bette Davis and Katharine Hepburn, but felt discouraged by the lack of dark-haired actresses in Hollywood. She recalled, "In the Walt Disney cartoons, all the witches and evil queens were really dark. There was nobody I could look at and think, 'That's who I'm like.'"

Cher's primary musical inspirations were Hank Williams, Eartha Kitt and Ray Charles; his rendition of the song "Georgia on My Mind" left a strong impression on her. Cher has said that his 1956 appereance on the American TV show American Bandstand "burst her into tears" and "she's never felt more connected to anything in her life". Cher has cited American singer and actor Elvis Presley as her idol; when she was eleven years old she attended his concert at the Pan-Pacific Auditorium, the first performance she ever attended. She later reflected on the experience, stating: "Even at that age he made me realize the tremendous effect a performer could have on an audience." Decades later, she paid the ultimate tribute to this childhood influence in her 1995 music video for "Walking in Memphis," where she fully dressed up as Presley, mimicking his signature moves.

Cher was born to an Armenian-American father of the Armenian Apostolic Church tradition and a mother of mixed European ancestry, and she was raised in a household that identified with Christianity, though she has said that her family was not strictly observant and that religion did not play a dominant role in her upbringing. From the 1990s onward, she expressed interest in Buddhism and has described herself as a practicing Buddhist in an interview. She has stated that she has "played around with Buddhism for years" and continues to return to Buddhist practices such as meditation and study. Cher has said that Buddhist teachings provide her with spiritual grounding and that "the soul of the universe, everything that I need, I can find in its practice."

=== Musical style and voice ===
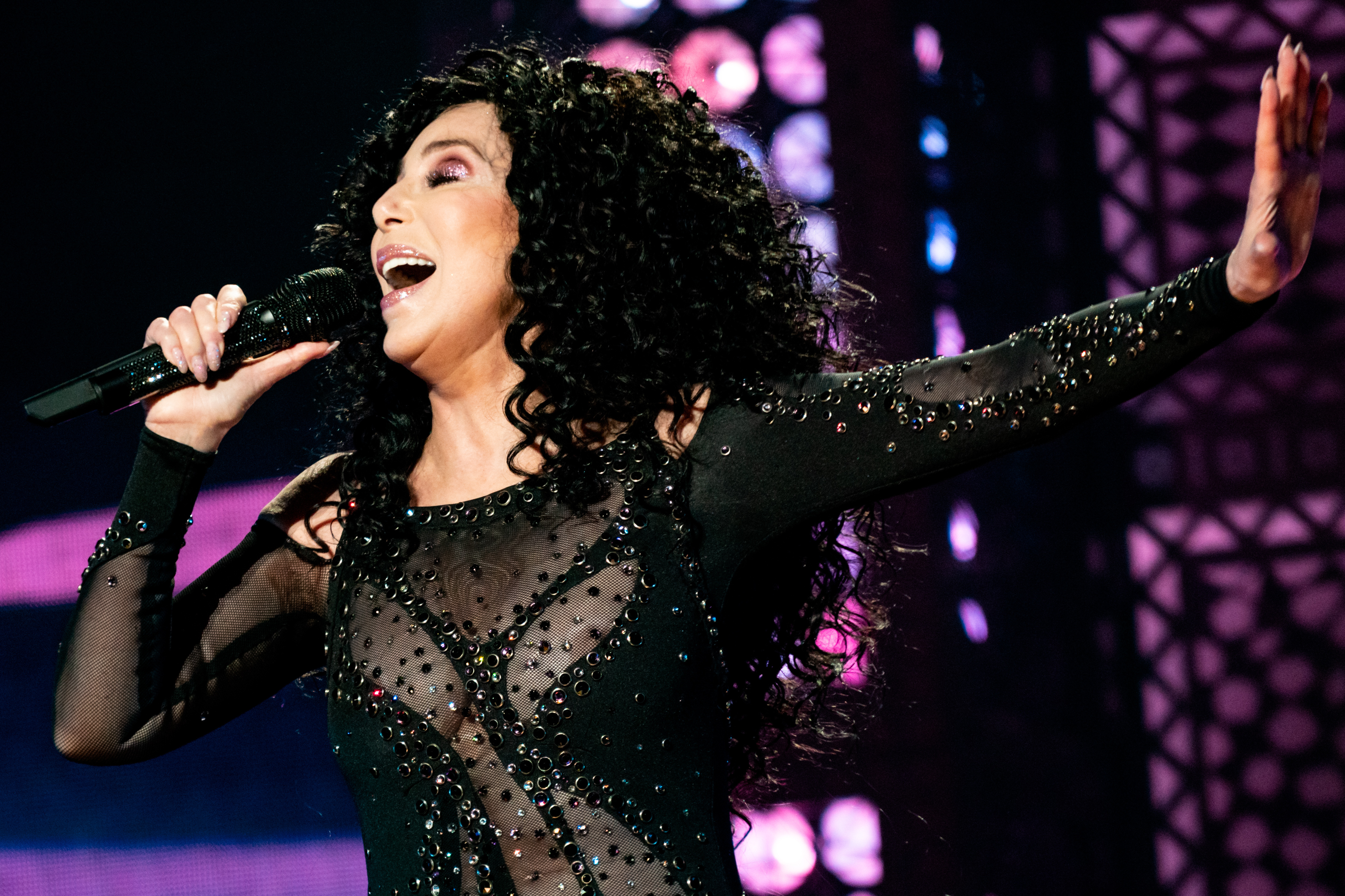
Cher performing on the Here We Go Again Tour, 2019

Cher has explored diverse musical styles, including rock (folk, punk, arena and pop subgenres), soul, jazz, disco, new wave, power ballads, hip-hop and electronic dance music, aiming to "remain relevant and do work that strikes a chord". Music historian Annie Zaleski wrote in Cher's Rock and Roll Hall of Fame induction essay that she sings "nearly every style of music" effortlessly. Cher's music often centers on heartbreak, independence and women's empowerment, making her a "brokenhearted symbol of a strong but decidedly single woman", according to Out's Judy Wieder. Goldmine's Phill Marder credited Cher's musical success to her "nearly flawless" song selection, noting that while Sonny Bono contributed to early hits, most of her solo successes came from independent songwriters she chose. Her 2000 album Not Commercial, largely self-written, has a "1970s singer-songwriter feel" that highlights her storytelling skills, according to AllMusic's Jose F. Promis.

Robert Hilburn of the Los Angeles Times wrote, "There were a lot of great records by female singers in the early days of rock ... None, however, reflected the authority and command that we associate with rock 'n' roll today as much as [Cher's] key early hits". Some of Cher's early songs discuss subjects rarely addressed in American popular music such as divorce, prostitution, unplanned and underaged pregnancy, and racism. According to AllMusic's Joe Viglione, the 1972 single "The Way of Love" is "either about a woman expressing her love for another woman or a woman saying au revoir to a gay male she loved". Her ability to carry both male and female ranges allowed her to sing solo in androgynous and gender-neutral songs.

"Believe" (1998)
"Believe" pioneered the use of Auto-Tune to intentionally distort vocals—a technique later known as the "Cher effect".

"Believe" without Auto-Tune
For comparison, Auto-Tune is not applied in this section.

Cher's contralto voice has been praised for its distinctiveness. Ann Powers of The New York Times described it as "a quintessential rock voice: impure, quirky [and] a fine vehicle for projecting personality." Zaleski called her timbre "recognizable, dusky and sultry, like exquisite black velvet", with a wide range and "warbling" vibrato. AllMusic's Bruce Eder stated that her voice's "intensity and passion" are amplified by her acting skills, creating "an incredibly powerful experience for the listener". The Guardian's Laura Snapes called her voice "miraculous", capable of expressing "vulnerability, vengeance and pain" simultaneously. Zaleski added that her vocal delivery feels like "a direct line to her soul", while author Paul Simpson observed that "she spits out the words ... with such conviction you'd think she was delivering an eternal truth about the human condition".

Writing about Cher's musical output during the 1960s, Hilburn stated that "no one matched the pure, seductive wallop of Cher". By contrast, her vocal performances during the 1970s were described by Eder as "dramatic, highly intense ... [and] almost as much 'acted' as sung". First heard in the 1980 record Black Rose, Cher employed sharper, more aggressive vocals on her hard rock-oriented albums, establishing her sexually confident image. For the 1995 album It's a Man's World, she restrained her vocals, singing in higher registers and without vibrato.

Cher's 1998 song "Believe" was the first commercial recording to use Auto-Tune—an audio processor for correcting off-key vocals—as a stylistic effect, creating a robotic, futuristic sound. Cher, who proposed the effect, faced resistance from her label but insisted it remain, saying, "You can change [the song] over my dead body". Dubbed the "Cher effect", the technique was later described by Pitchfork's Simon Reynolds as having "revolutionized the sound of popular music" and as "the sound of the 21st century". Cher used Auto-Tune extensively on Living Proof (2001) and later albums.

=== Music videos and performances ===
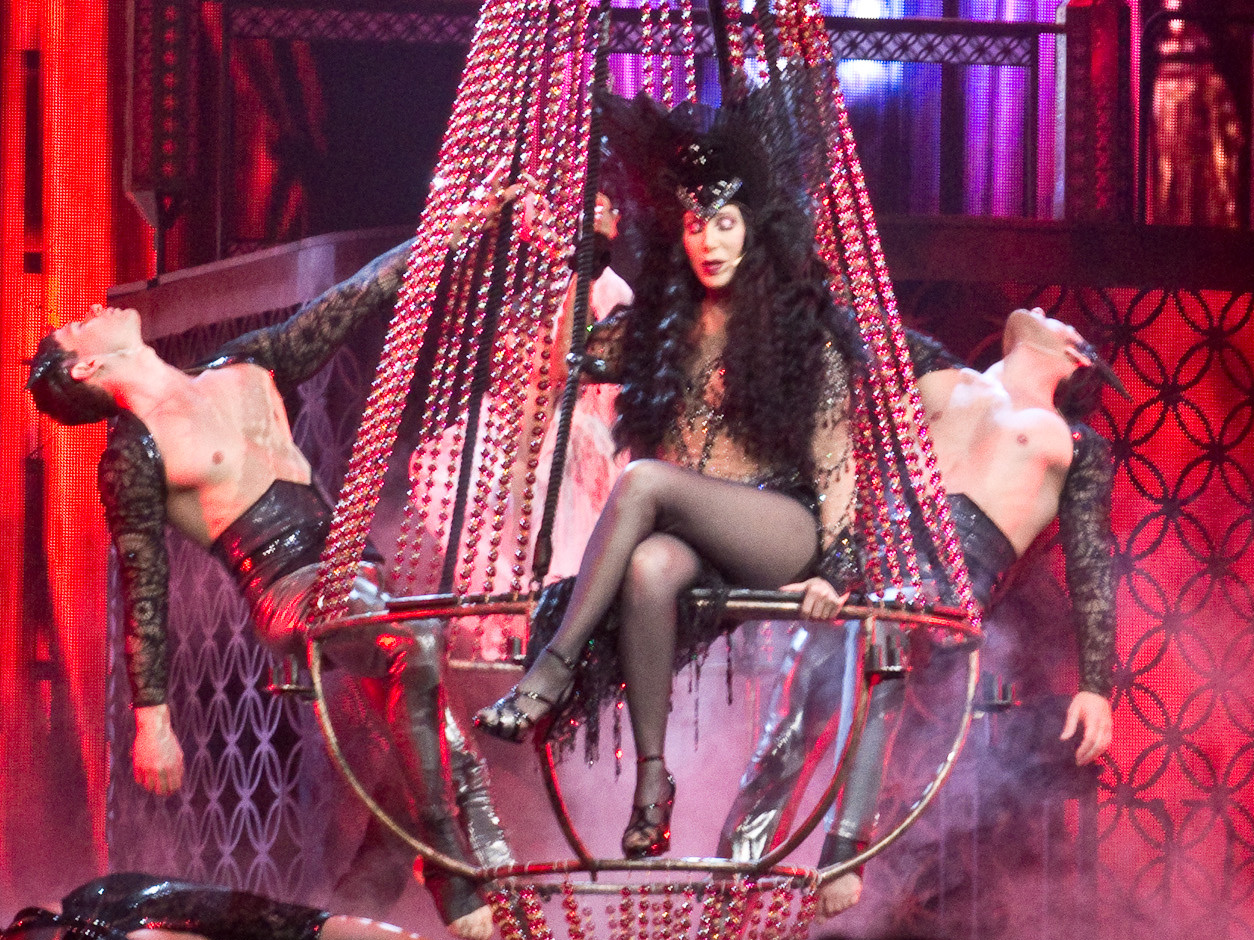
Cher performing on the Dressed to Kill Tour, 2014

Cher's music videos and live performances have frequently reflected her public image, addressing themes such as self-construction, female sexuality and the pursuit of perfection. Her concerts often include biographical montages and self-referential visuals. University College Dublin professor Diane Negra described them as multimedia retrospectives that merge different phases of her career into a cohesive stage narrative and frame performance as a form of autobiography. The New York Times observed that Cher's onstage appearances alongside projected images of her younger selves function to reaffirm and reclaim earlier identities, while the Los Angeles Times described her shows as rooted in "her larger-than-life story [and] mythology of self-reinvention".

Cher's 1980 video for "Hell on Wheels" employed cinematic techniques, and film historian Lawrence J. Quirk described it as one of the earliest examples of a modern music video. The 1989 music video for "If I Could Turn Back Time" was the first to be banned by MTV, due to controversy over Cher's performance aboard the battleship USS Missouri, where she straddled a cannon in a leather thong that revealed her tattooed buttocks, accompanied by homoerotic imagery featuring sailors. Rolling Stone magazine listed the music video on the 2021 "Sexiest Music Videos of All Time" list.

In her 1991 Cher... at the Mirage concert video, she subverts the then-typical staging of female pop performances by replacing female backup dancers with a male dancer impersonating her. Dressed in a replica of her 1986 Academy Awards outfit, the impersonator initially appears to be Cher; Cher then emerges in a different costume, while the impersonator interacts with oversized props symbolizing fame and media attention. Negra interpreted this segment as Cher casting herself as the narrator of her own life story, using the impersonator to emphasize her status as a "fictionalized production" shaped by media and performance—a dynamic she described as offering audiences a "pleasurable plurality". Commenting on the scale of her shows, Tony Spilde of The Bismarck Tribune wrote that Cher's "lavish concerts have become bigger than the music they're meant to promote". James Sullivan of the San Francisco Chronicle credited her with influencing the development of stadium-scale concerts, stating, "She's comfortable enough to see such imitation as flattery, not theft."

=== Acting style and screen persona ===
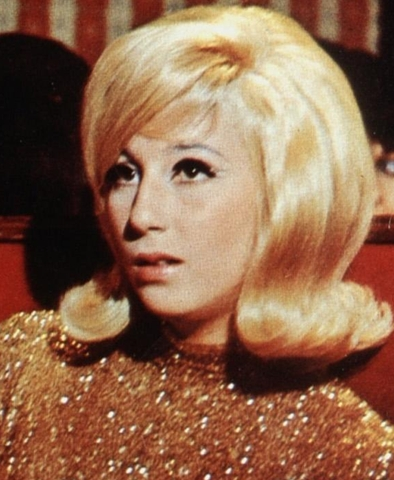
Cher in her first leading film role, Good Times (1967)

Maclean's magazine's Barbara Wickens described Cher as "probably the most fascinating movie star of her generation", highlighting her "magnetic" screen presence and her ability to be both "boldly shocking" and "ultimately enigmatic". Film Comment wrote, "For Cher is a star. That is, she manages the movie star trick of being at once a character and at the same time never allowing you to forget: that's Cher." New York Post critic David Edelstein attributed Cher's "top-ranking star quality" to her capacity for projecting "honesty, rawness and emotionality", adding that she "wears her vulnerability on her sleeve". New York magazine's David Denby pointed to her distinctive appearance as a key factor in her appeal, describing her look as "odd, a bit oriental and snaky" and suggesting that it aligns with "the traditional definition of a Hollywood star—that you always want to see more".

Professor Yvonne Tasker noted that Cher's film roles mirror her public image as a rebellious, sexually autonomous and self-made woman. She often portrays women who help marginalized male characters navigate mainstream society. This perception was reinforced in The X-Files episode "The Post-Modern Prometheus" (1997), which follows a scientist's grotesque creature who idolizes Cher because of her role in Mask (1985), where her character cares for her disfigured son. Film critic Kathleen Rowe wrote of Moonstruck (1987) that the depiction of Cher's character as "a 'woman on top' [is] enhanced by the unruly star persona Cher brings to the part".

Cher was ranked first by Billboard on its list of "The 100 Best Acting Performances by Musicians in Movies" for her role in Moonstruck, with the performance described as "the standard by which you mentally check all others". The film was named the eighth-greatest romantic comedy of all time by the American Film Institute. American singer Lady Gaga, for her first leading film role in A Star Is Born (2018), was advised by the film's co-writer Eric Roth to draw inspiration from Cher's performance in Moonstruck, citing a vulnerable quality alongside a character who is both self-assured and, at times, uncertain. People included Cher among its "100 Greatest Movie Stars of Our Time" and Biography ranked her the third-favorite leading actress of all time, behind Katharine Hepburn and Audrey Hepburn. Cher was featured in The New York Times Magazine's annual "Best Actors" list for 2020, becoming the first actor included without appearing in a theatrical release that year; her performance in Moonstruck (1987) was praised as "radiant" and a source of comfort during quarantine.

== Legacy ==
She has been able to reinvent herself over and over, becoming all things for all people. She has been a singer, television personality and movie star. Each step deepened the fan base and made her the ultimate chameleon.

— Academic Richard Aquila on Cher (2003).

Cher's profound influence on popular music has led critics to refer to her as the "Goddess of Pop", in publications such as The Washington Post, Time and Billboard. (Note: Cher has been referred to as the "Goddess of Pop" in various publications. Primary sources using the title include Billboard, Harper's Bazaar, Los Angeles Times, Love, The Mercury News, Rolling Stone, Time, USA Today, Vogue España and The Washington Post. Secondary sources describing her as "often called", "nicknamed" or "known as" the "Goddess of Pop" include ABC News, CR Fashion Book, The Cut, E!, The Independent and New York Post.) Ann Powers of the Los Angeles Times called Cher a "mainstream translator" of 1960s counterculture, casting her as a bridge between teenage rebellion and marketability. Music critic Jeff Miers credited Cher with setting the template for generations of female pop artists, citing her mastery of theatrical presentation, seamless genre shifts and knack for provoking without losing mainstream appeal. According to The New York Times, Cher "earned her mononym" and inspired "an entire industry of imitators, both figurative and literal". Shon Faye of Dazed wrote that her legacy underpins many modern pop stars: "If Madonna and Lady Gaga and Kylie Minogue and Cyndi Lauper were playing football, Cher would be the stadium they played on and the sun that shone down on them." Rob Sheffield of Rolling Stone called her "the one-woman embodiment" of pop music.

Cher's career has been marked by continual reinvention; professor Richard Aquila described her as "the ultimate pop chameleon", while The New York Times dubbed her the "Queen of the Comeback". The Atlantic's Sophie Gilbert wrote, "Decades before Madonna had reinventions and Taylor Swift had eras, Cher had comebacks—triumphs over decline in which she'd reemerge stronger, shinier, and more resolute than ever." Cher remarked, "It's a thousand times harder to come back than to become. Becoming famous is hard, but making a comeback is almost impossible."

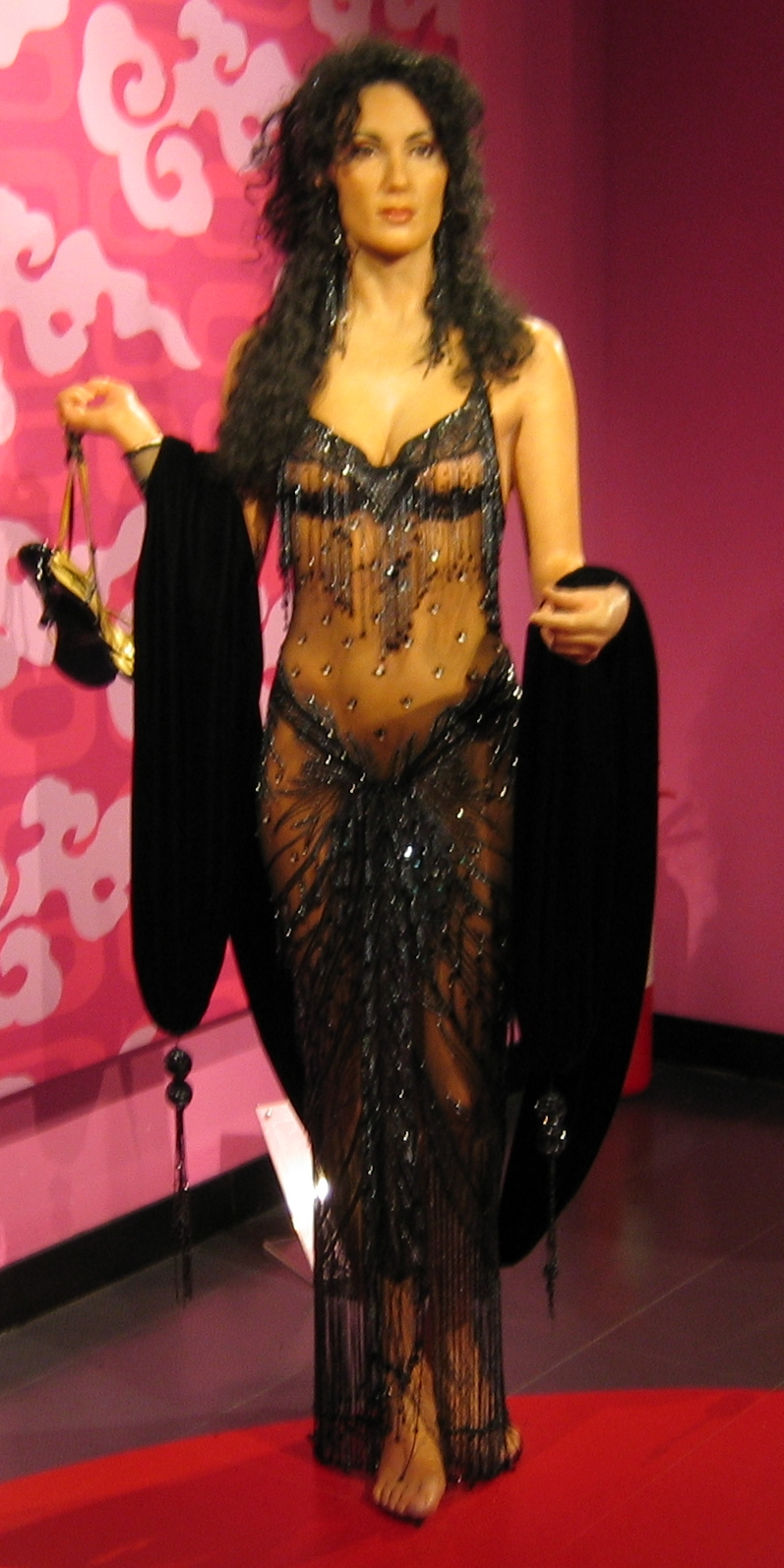
Wax figure of Cher wearing a replica of her 60th Academy Awards outfit

Billboard wrote that Cher "revolutionized the idea of what a pop star could visually accomplish, the way they could create multiple personas that live on and off-stage"; as the red carpet emerged as a "cultural fixture" in the 1980s, "Cher became one of its leaders". The Boston Globe described her as a forerunner of transformation in pop music, crediting her with driving her own evolution and turning reinvention into a deliberate strategy rather than a survival instinct. Author Craig Crawford described Cher as "a model of flexible career management", highlighting how she adapted her image to align with cultural trends while maintaining a rebellious persona that made her transformations both strategic and authentic. Author Lucy O'Brien saw her as embodying the American Dream of self-reinvention by challenging assumptions around aging in the entertainment industry.

Cher's career has drawn sustained attention from critics and scholars as a case study in gender roles and feminism in the entertainment industry. Billboard described her as a "pioneer of female autonomy" who "paved a way in a sexist industry" during a "male-driven" era. Goldmine's Phill Marder said Cher advanced "feminine rebellion" in 1960s rock, describing her as "the prototype of the female rock star". Billboard credited her with establishing an "androgynous musical identity" that predated and influenced artists such as David Bowie and Patti Smith. Marder attributed her rebellious image in part to her commanding, "near dominatrix" stage persona alongside Sonny Bono and her rise to greater prominence as a solo act.

Early in her career, Cher's critics often framed her output as an extension of male collaborators, a view Cher addressed directly: "It was a time when girl singers were patted on the head for being good and told not to think". Over time, her image evolved, reflecting what professor Yvonne Tasker described as her ambition to build an acting career "on her own terms" by rejecting both "dependence on a man [and] the conventional role assigned to women [over 40] in an industry that fetishises youth". AllMusic noted that during her popular 1970s TV shows with Sonny Bono, "he was a diminutive foil to Cher's sexually provocative comedienne", reversing traditional gender dynamics and positioning her as the comedic lead. Director George Schlatter credited Cher with redefining women's roles in television comedy, stating, "Until Cher, women have been the joke, not done the joke ... She's the first female star to carry a show in the same way that men have".

In the weeks before Cher's 1988 Academy Award win, The New York Times' Stephanie Brush compared her impact on women to Jack Nicholson's cultural appeal among men, stating that she embodied women's "revenge fantasies" by confronting those who underestimated her: "You need to be more than beautiful to get away with this. You need to have been Cher for 40 years." Following the win, Ms. magazine praised her as an "authentic feminist hero" and "the quintessential woman of the '80s", citing her flamboyant self-presentation, her public confrontation with David Letterman and her candor about single motherhood and cosmetic surgery. A 1996 Dateline NBC interview clip featuring Cher's response to her mother's advice to "marry a rich man"—"Mom, I am a rich man"—went viral in 2016. Bustle magazine described the quote as a subversion of traditional gender norms and a feminist statement.

Cher's public image—marked by defiance, flamboyance and an unwavering sense of self—has itself become a subject of cultural study and popular fascination. Gilbert described Cher as "a walking, singing eye roll [who] has never met an obstacle without theatrically raising a middle finger." In Rolling Stone, Jancee Dunn noted her enduring coolness, attributing it to her refusal to conform: "Her motto is, 'I don't give a shit what you think, I'm going to wear this multicolored wig.'" Alexander Fury of The Independent described her celebrity as "seemingly immortal" and operating at an "omnipotent, uni-monikered level", while Frank Bruni of The New York Times wrote that she personifies "a magnitude of celebrity for which the word fame is pathetically insufficient". Bego emphasized her multifaceted career: "No one in the history of show business has had a career of the magnitude and scope of Cher's. She has been a teenage pop star, a television hostess, a fashion model, a rock star, a Broadway actress, an Oscar-winning movie star, a disco diva and the subject of a mountain of press coverage." Lynch concluded, "The world would certainly be different if she hadn't stayed so irrevocably Cher from the start."

== Achievements ==
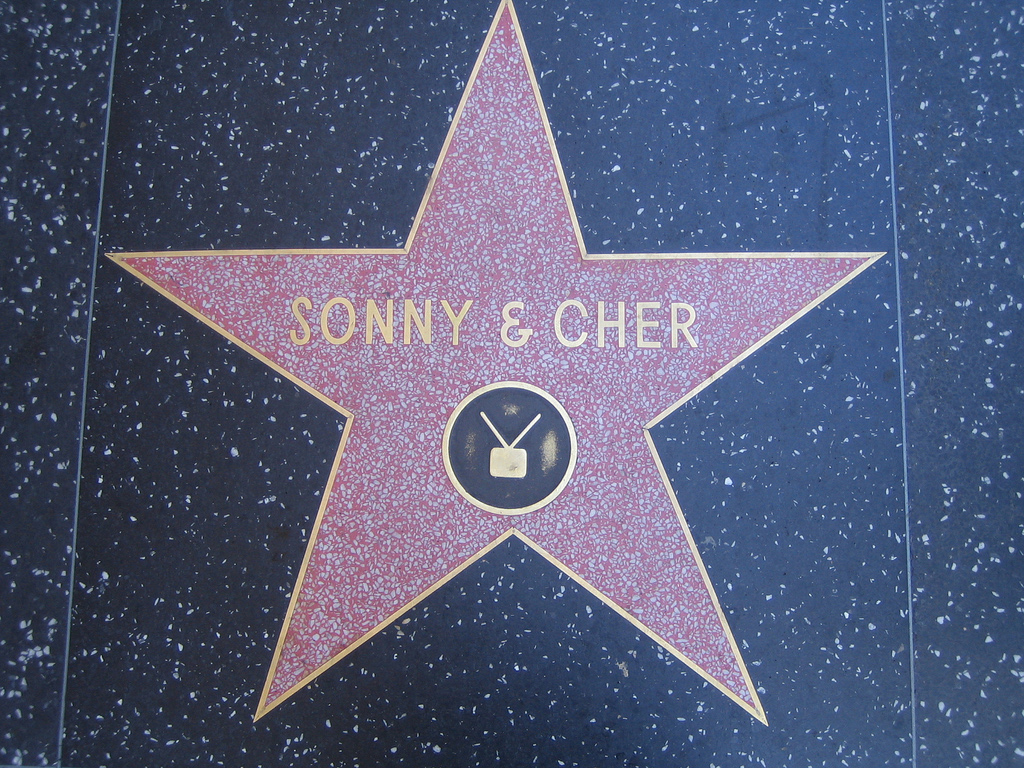
Star for Sonny & Cher on the Hollywood Walk of Fame. Cher has declined a solo star.

Cher has sold over 100 million records as a solo artist, ranking among the best-selling music artists of all time. She is one of five singer-actors to have earned both an Academy Award for acting and a US number-one single and the only Academy Award-winning actor inducted into the Rock and Roll Hall of Fame. Her breakthrough single "I Got You Babe" (1965) is a Grammy Hall of Fame inductee and appeared on Rolling Stone's 2003 list of the "500 Greatest Songs of All Time". Billboard named "Gypsys, Tramps & Thieves" (1971) one of the greatest songs of the 20th century and listed "If I Could Turn Back Time" (1989) among its "500 Best Pop Songs" in 2023. "Believe" (1998), the UK's best-selling single by a female artist, was included on Rolling Stone's updated "500 Greatest Songs of All Time" list in 2021 and ranked eighth in a 2003 BBC poll of the world's favorite songs—the only American entry.

Cher is the only solo artist to have achieved a number-one single on a US Billboard chart in seven consecutive decades and the only solo artist to have released new material that reached the Official UK Top 40 in seven consecutive decades (1960s–2020s). She held the previous record for the longest span between a first and most recent number-one single on the US Billboard Hot 100—33 years, seven months and three weeks—from "I Got You Babe" (August 14, 1965) to the final week at number one for "Believe" (April 3, 1999). (Note: Brenda Lee surpassed Cher's record for the longest span between a first and most recent number-one single on the US Billboard Hot 100 in December 2023, when "Rockin' Around the Christmas Tree" reached number one for the first time since its 1958 release. Until then, Lee's only number-one hits had been "I'm Sorry" and "I Want to Be Wanted", both released in 1960.) At 52, she was the oldest female artist to top both the Hot 100 and the UK singles chart.

Cher has received numerous lifetime and career achievement honors, including the Vanguard Award at the 1998 GLAAD Media Awards, the Legend Award at the 1999 World Music Awards, the Influence on Fashion Award from the Council of Fashion Designers of America (CFDA) in 1999, the Lucy Award for Innovation in Television at the 2000 Women in Film Awards, the Icon Award at the 2017 Billboard Music Awards the Ambassador for the Arts Award at the 2019 Chita Rivera Awards for Dance and Choreography and the Grammy Lifetime Achievement Award in 2026. Her handprints and footprints are set in the forecourt of Grauman's Chinese Theatre in Hollywood. She has a star on the Hollywood Walk of Fame as part of Sonny & Cher and was offered a solo star in 1983 but declined the required personal appearance. In 2018, Cher received the Kennedy Center Honors, the highest cultural recognition in the US, and in 2024, she was inducted into the Rock and Roll Hall of Fame. In 2026, Cher was ranked 130th in Forbes' inaugural "Self-Made 250", a list of the greatest living self-made Americans.

== Discography ==
Solo studio albums

- All I Really Want to Do (1965)
- The Sonny Side of Chér (1966)
- Chér (1966)
- With Love, Chér (1967)
- Backstage (1968)
- 3614 Jackson Highway (1969)
- Chér (reissued as Gypsys, Tramps & Thieves) (1971)
- Foxy Lady (1972)
- Bittersweet White Light (1973)
- Half-Breed (1973)
- Dark Lady (1974)
- Stars (1975)
- I'd Rather Believe in You (1976)
- Cherished (1977)
- Take Me Home (1979)
- Prisoner (1979)
- I Paralyze (1982)
- Cher (1987)
- Heart of Stone (1989)
- Love Hurts (1991)
- It's a Man's World (1995)
- Believe (1998)
- Not Commercial (2000)
- Living Proof (2001)
- Closer to the Truth (2013)
- Dancing Queen (2018)
- Christmas (2023)

Collaborative studio albums

- Two the Hard Way (with Gregg Allman as Allman and Woman) (1977)
- Black Rose (as lead vocalist of Black Rose) (1980)

== Filmography ==
Films starred in

- Wild on the Beach (1965)
- Good Times (1967)
- Chastity (1969)
- Come Back to the 5 & Dime, Jimmy Dean, Jimmy Dean (1982)
- Silkwood (1983)
- Mask (1985)
- Suspect (1987)
- The Witches of Eastwick (1987)
- Moonstruck (1987)
- Mermaids (1990)
- The Player (1992)
- Prêt-à-Porter (1994)
- Faithful (1996)
- If These Walls Could Talk (1996; also director)
- Tea with Mussolini (1999)
- Stuck on You (2003)
- Burlesque (2010)
- Zookeeper (2011)
- Mamma Mia! Here We Go Again (2018)
- Bobbleheads: The Movie (2020)

Headlining TV shows, specials and documentaries

- The Sonny & Cher Nitty Gritty Hour (1971)
- The Sonny & Cher Comedy Hour (1971–1974)
- Cher (1975–1976)
- The Sonny and Cher Show (1976–1977)
- Cher... Special (1978)
- Cher... and Other Fantasies (1979)
- Standing Room Only: Cher in Concert (1981)
- Cher... A Celebration at Caesars (1983)
- Cher... at the Mirage (1991)
- Sonny & Me: Cher Remembers (1998)
- Cher: Live in Concert – From the MGM Grand in Las Vegas (1999)
- Cher: The Farewell Tour (2003)
- Dear Mom, Love Cher (2013)
- Cher & the Loneliest Elephant (2021)

== Tours and residencies ==
Headlining tours

- Take Me Home Tour (1979–1982)
- Heart of Stone Tour (1989–1990)
- Love Hurts Tour (1991–1992)
- Do You Believe? Tour (1999–2000)
- Living Proof: The Farewell Tour (2002–2005)
- Dressed to Kill Tour (2014)
- Here We Go Again Tour (2018–2020)

Co-headlining tours

- Two the Hard Way Tour (with Gregg Allman as Allman and Woman) (1977)

Residencies

- Take Me Home Tour (1979–1982)
- Cher (2008–2011)
- Classic Cher (2017–2020)

== Published works ==
- The Ugly Duckling (1987)
- Forever Fit (1991)
- The First Time (1998)
- Cher: The Memoir (2024)

== See also ==
- Forbes list of highest-earning musicians
- Honorific nicknames in popular music
- List of artists who reached number one in the United States
- List of best-selling music artists
- List of highest-grossing concert tours
- List of legally mononymous people
- List of Rock and Roll Hall of Fame inductees
