= The First Time (memoir) =

1998 book by Cher and Jeff Coplon

- Authors: Cher, Jeff Coplon
- Language: English
- Genre: Memoir
- Publisher: Simon & Schuster
- Publication date: November 17, 1998
- Publication place: United States
- Media type: Print (Hardcover)
- Pages: 272
- ISBN: 0-684-80900-1
- OCLC: 231783374

The First Time is a memoir by American entertainer Cher, co-written with Jeff Coplon. It was released on November 17, 1998 by Simon & Schuster.

== Background ==
Following Sonny Bono's death in a skiing accident in 1998, Cher delivered a tearful eulogy at his funeral, calling him "the most unforgettable character" she had met. Later that year, she published The First Time, a collection of autobiographical essays of "first-time" events in her life. The manuscript was nearly complete when Sonny died, and Cher was initially reluctant to include his death, concerned it might appear exploitative. She told Rolling Stone, "I might have [ignored it] if I cared more about what people think than what I know is right for me."

== Reception ==
The First Time received mostly positive reviews. Carol Wright of The Manhattan Mercury wrote, "Cher has written a wonderful memoir ... What amazes me about Cher is how she can make light out of some drastic situations." Deborah Wilker of the Sun Sentinel called it "classy" despite its blunt language, adding, "There is a wistful, almost melancholy tone to much of the book." Booth Moore of the Los Angeles Times found it "frank", highlighting that "Cher has never been known for her modesty."

Hank Stuever of the Austin American-Statesman described it as "a book about the certainty and survivability of Cherhood, Cherness, Cher Ever After", stating, "the one-named icon reveals all the details you probably already know about her life". In a negative review, Patricia Ryan of The New York Times wrote, "Coming from someone who is so adept at cutting through corniness, it is a shame that Cher's memoir ... is so banal", adding, "There is probably just enough material here for an illustrated calendar on Cher's career."
