= The Ugly Duckling (audiobook) =

Studio album (Audiobook) by Cher
- Released: 1987
- Recorded: 1986
- Genre: Spoken word
- Length: 33:11
- Label: Windham Hill
- Producers: Mark Sottnick, Daniel Drasin, Patrick Drasin

Cher chronology
I Paralyze (1982)	The Ugly Duckling (1987)	Cher (1987)

Professional ratings
Review scores
Source	Rating
Allmusic	link

The Ugly Duckling is an audiobook of the classic 1843 fairy tale of the same name by Hans Christian Andersen. It is narrated by American singer-actress Cher, and was released in 1987 by Windham Hill Records.

== Track listing ==
Part 1

1. "Sheebeg Sheemore"
2. "Lullabye"
3. "The Munster Cloak"
4. "Ode to Whiskey"
5. "Three Ravens"
6. "Down by the Sea"

Part 2

1. "Three Ravens"
2. "Mrs. Judge"
3. "Down by the Sea"
4. "Carolan's Ramble to Cashel"
5. "Carolan's Farewell to Music"
6. "Dark Woman of the Glen"
7. "Sheebeg Sheemore"

== Production ==
- Hans Christian Andersen: Author
- Cher: Narrator
- Joan Jeanrenaud: Cello
- Mark Sottnick: Producer
- Daniel Drasin: Producer
- Patrick Drasin: Arranger, Producer
- Patrick Ball: Arranger, Composer, Harp
