= Cher: The Memoir =

2024 memoir by Cher

Cher: The Memoir, Part One
- Author: Cher
- Audio read by: Stephanie J. Block
- Language: English
- Genre: Memoir
- Publisher: Dey Street Books (US); HarperCollins (UK)
- Publication date: November 19, 2024
- Publication place: United States
- Media type: Print (Hardcover)
- Pages: 432
- ISBN: 978-0062863102
- OCLC: 1464693818

Cher: The Memoir is the first of a two-part memoir by the American entertainer Cher. The book was released November 19, 2024 by Dey Street Books in the US and HarperCollins in the UK. Part One details Cher's childhood, her early success, and meeting her first husband, singer-songwriter Sonny Bono; the book spans 1956–1976. The audiobook was read by Cher and the actress Stephanie J. Block, who portrayed Cher in the Tony award-winning musical The Cher Show.

Part One debuted at number one on The New York Times Bestseller list and remained on the spot for three weeks. It also debuted at number two on Publishers Weekly Bestseller List selling 44,701 units in its first week.

Part Two is set to be released on April 20, 2027. Cher first revealed that she had begun writing a memoir in 2017.
