= The Letter (Don & Dewey song) =

"The Letter" was a song first released in 1958 by Don & Dewey, written by Dewey Terry and Don "Sugarcane" Harris. It was later recorded by The Long and The Short, and then Caesar and Cleo.

== Don & Dewey version ==
"The Letter"

Single by Don & Dewey
- A-side: "The Letter"
- B-side: "Koko Joe"
- Released: July 1958
- Length: 2:20
- Label: Specialty 639
- Composer: Harris-Terry

US singles chronology
"Justine" (1958)	"The Letter" (1958)	"Farmer John" (1959)

=== Airplay ===
For the week of 6 September 1958, "The Letter" was at no. 9 on the WHAT playlist in Philadelphia on the Disk Jockey Regional Record Reports list. It was also at No. 8 on the WHAT playlist on the R&B Disk Jockey Regional Record Reports list.

=== Sales ===
For the week of 20 September it was at no. 8 at Comer's Record Nook for the R & B Retail Outlet list.

== The Long and the Short version ==
"The Letter"

Single by The Long and The Short
- A-side: "The Letter"
- B-side: "Love Is a Funny Thing"
- Released: 1964
- Label: Decca F 11964
- Composers: Harris, Terry
- Producer: Robert Hartford-Davis

UK singles chronology
"The Letter" (1964)	"Choc Ice" (1964)

=== Background ===
The Long and The Short were made up of Robert Taylor on bass, Allan Grindley on drums, Robert McKinnely on rhythm guitar, Gerry Watts on piano and Les Saint on lead guitar. They recorded "The Letter" which was backed with "Love is a Funny Thing" and released on Decca F.11964.

=== Charts ===
For the week ending 18 September, "The Letter" peaked at no. 35 in the Record Mirror Britain's Top 50 chart. The record was still in the chart at no. 49 for the week ending October 10, 1964.

For the week of 3 October 1964, "The Letter" debuted at no. 46 on the Radio Caroline chart.

== Sonny & Cher version ==
"The Letter"

Single by Caesar and Cleo
- A-side: "The Letter"
- B-side: "String Fever"
- Released: March 1964
- Recorded: 18 February 1964
- Length: 2:02
- Label: Vault V-909
- Composer: Harris - Terry

US singles chronology
"The Letter" (1964)	"Love Is Strange" (1964)

"The Letter"

Single by Sonny & Cher
- A-side: "The Letter"
- B-side: "Spring Fever"
- Released: 7 October 1965
- Recorded: 18 February 1964
- Length: 2:02
- Label: Vault V-916
- Composer: Harris - Terry
- Producer: Sonny Bono

US singles chronology
"But You're Mine" (1965)	"The Letter" (1965)	"Love Is Strange" (1965)

=== Background ===
The song was recorded on 18 February 1964. The record was originally credited to Caesar & Cleo. The song was recorded under the direction of Richard Delvy. The arrangements were handled by Harold Battiste. The B side was "String Fever". Caesar & Cleo were actually Sonny & Cher. When they had a hit with "I Got You Babe" under their name Sonny & Cher, Vault Records took advantage of an opportunity and re-released the single as a Sonny & Cher record, which gave the label its first national chart hit.

=== Reception ===
As reported in the 7 March 1964 issue of Music Reporter, the new Caesar & Cleo single, "The Letter" was a "grand slam West Coast Pick". The stations playing the single were KYA and KEWB in San Francisco and KFWB and KRLA in Los Angeles. The distributors ATCO Records reported that dealers were finding it hard to keep up with the orders.

The record was one of the Pop Spotlights in the 14 March issue of Billboard. The reviewer referred to the single as a driver, unrelenting and highly danceable.

=== Airplay ===
For the week of 30 October 1965, the Cash Box Radio Active Chart showed that 15% of radio stations had added "The Letter" to their program schedule that week.

=== Charts ===
The record, credited to Sonny & Cher debuted at no. 47 in the Cash Box Looking Ahead chart for the week of 23 October. It peaked at no. 4 on the Cash Box Looking Ahead Chart for the week of 20 November.

For the week of 27 November 1975, "The Letter" debuted at No. 9 in the Record World Singles Coming Up chart. The Sonny & Cher version of "The Letter" peaked at no. 75 nationally.
