= Richard Aquila (historian) =

American historian

Academic background
- Education: Ohio State University (PhD in history), Bowling Green State University (BA, MA)

Academic work
- Institutions: Penn State University (2004-), Ball State University (1979-2004)
- Main interests: U.S. social and cultural history, American West, American Indian history, popular culture

Richard Aquila is an American historian and professor emeritus of History and American Studies at Penn State University. He is known for his works on U.S. social and cultural history.

== Books ==
- The Iroquois Restoration. Paperback edition with new introduction, University of Nebraska Press, 1997; originally published by Wayne State University Press, 1983.
- That Old Time Rock & Roll: A Chronicle of an Era, 1954-63. Macmillan/Schirmer Books, hardcover and paperback, 1989. New edition with new introduction published by University of Illinois Press, 2000.
- Wanted Dead or Alive: the American West in Popular Culture. University of Illinois Press, hardcover, 1996; paperback, 1998.
- Home Front Soldier: The Story of a G.I. and His Italian American Family During World War II. State University of New York Press, hardcover and paperback, 1999.
- The Sagebrush Trail: Western Movies and Twentieth-Century America. University of Arizona Press, 2015.
- Let’s Rock! How 1950s America Created Elvis and the Rock & Roll Craze. Rowman & Littlefield Publishers, 2017.
- Rock & Roll in Kennedy’s America: A Cultural History of the Early 1960s. Johns Hopkins University Press, 2022.
