= House of Cardin =

- Directed by: P. David Ebersole; Todd Hughes
- Produced by: Cori Coppola
- Cinematography: Laurent King
- Edited by: Mel Mel Sukekawa Mooring; Brad Comfort
- Music by: James Peter Moffatt
- Production company: The Ebersole Hughes Company
- Distributed by: Utopia; L'Atelier Distribution
- Release dates: September 6, 2019 (Venice Film Festival); September 15, 2020 (United States); September 23, 2020 (France); October 2, 2020 (Japan); July 23, 2020 (Australia)
- Running time: 95 minutes
- Countries: United States; France
- Languages: French; English; Japanese; Italian; Chinese

House of Cardin is a 2019 Franco/American documentary film directed by P. David Ebersole and Todd Hughes. The film details the life and career of Pierre Cardin, the Italian-born French designer and futurist whose influence shaped the global economy and revolutionized the fashion industry. Chronicling Cardin's humble beginnings, his immigration from Mussolini's Italy and his coming of age in Nazi occupied France, the young tailor arrives in Paris in 1945 and begins his enchanted entrée into the world of haute couture by way of Jeanne Paquin, Jean Cocteau, Elsa Schiaparelli and Christian Dior. Opening his own house in 1950, Cardin eventually introduces prêt-à-porter and envisions future fashion. He establishes the power of the designer logo and takes his name in design to explore many avenues of lifestyle, including furniture, housewares and a record label. A frustrated actor, Cardin transitions into overseeing the long-running experimental theater/cultural center Espace Cardin for half a century, as well as developing an annual music and theater Festival de Lacoste while expanding his brand globally. Cardin's personal relation with long-time partner Andre Oliver and his love affair with Jeanne Moreau are also explored.

The film's score is written by James Peter Moffat and is produced by Cori Coppola. It premiered at the 2019 Venice Film Festival in the Giornate degli Autori with Mr. Cardin in attendance. The French premiere marked the first public event in Paris during the COVID-19 lockdowns at Théâtre du Châtelet on September 15, 2020. It was purchased theatrically for Australia, New Zealand, France, Russia, Italy, Japan, Brazil, Spain and China and was released in the US through Utopia. House of Cardin swept the 2019 Cinémoi International Fashion Film Awards (IFFAs) winning the Lifetime Achievement Award for Pierre Cardin, Best Fashion Feature Film, Best Directors of a Fashion Feature film for P. David Ebersole and Todd Hughes and a nomination for Best Cinematography of a Fashion Feature Film.

== Background ==
Filmmakers P. David Ebersole and Todd Hughes were in Paris to promote their documentary Mansfield 66/67 when they went to the Pierre Cardin Boutique on the rue du Faubourg Saint-Honoré hoping to get a photo with their idol. They were avid collector's of the designer's furniture and lifestyle design, even owning the AMC Javelin Cardin designed in 1972. After a career of refusing to participate on a documentary, on September 6, 2017, Pierre Cardin chose Eberole and Hughes to produce and direct the authorized film about his life and career upon their first meeting at Minim's, the brasserie of Cardin's Maxim's. The film subsequently premiered at the Venice Film Festival on September 6, 2019, exactly two years to the day later.

== Cast ==
- Pierre Cardin
- Jean-Paul Gaultier
- Philippe Starck
- Naomi Campbell
- Sharon Stone
- Guo Pei
- Jean-Michel Jarre
- Alice Cooper
- Dionne Warwick
- Kenzō Takada
- Jenny Shimizu
- Hanae Mori
- Trina Turk
- Yumi Katsura
- Rodrigo Basilicati Cardin
- Maryse Gaspard
- Renée Taponier
- Claude Brouet
- Amy Fine Collins
- Laurence Benaïm
- Tony Glenville
- Matthew Gonder
- Jean Pascal Hesse
- Josée Dayan
- Jeanne Moreau (archival footage)
- Andre Oliver (archival footage)
- Hiroko Matsumoto (archival footage)
