= Alison Martino =

US television producer and historian

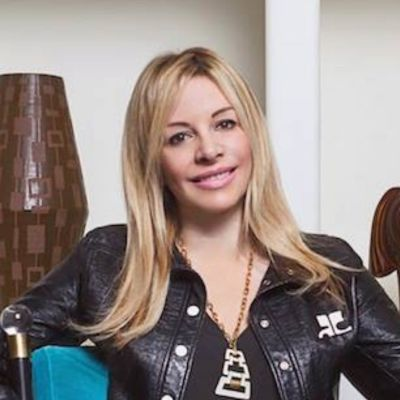
- Born: December 15, 1970 (age 55); Los Angeles, California, U.S.
- Occupations: Television producer, writer, historian
- Years active: 1998–present
- Parent: Al Martino

Alison Martino (born December 15, 1970 in Los Angeles, California) is a writer, television producer, and historian. She is the daughter of the singer Al Martino and his wife, flight attendant and model Judi Stilwell Martino.

Known as a Los Angeles historian and documentarian, Martino has been referred to as the "Godmother" of old LA and the Sunset Strip. Her knowledge of Los Angeles has been featured in numerous regional publications such as Curbed LA, Los Angeles Magazine, WeHoVille, The Hollywood Reporter and nationally in the Los Angeles Times, Huffington Post and The New York Times. She has also been featured in various television and radio programs such as ABC's Eye on L.A., NPR, and the nationally syndicated shows The Insider, Travel Channel's Baggage Battles, Bizarre Foods: Delicious Destinations and 2018's In Ice Cold Blood, hosted by Ice-T. In 2019, Alison became an on-air host and producer for Spectrum News channel on a series called The SoCal Scene produced by Make Fresh Productions.

As an author, she has written several articles for Los Angeles Magazine.

Martino is also a television producer, spending much of the late 1990s and 2000s in various production television roles, producing multiple episodes of E! Entertainment Television's Mysteries and Scandals as well as the popular reality shows Trading Spaces, Celebrity Rehab and the critically acclaimed Intervention. In 2014, she teamed up with P. David Ebersole and Todd Hughes of The Ebersole Hughes Company to create the web series VLA TV, premiering on her YouTube channel. In 2017, she co-produced documentaries on Pierre Cardin, Jayne Mansfield titled Mansfield 66/67. and Trina Lopez

In 2010, Martino created the online community Vintage Los Angeles which documents the history of Los Angeles.
