= Pierre Cardin =

Italian-French fashion designer (1922–2020)

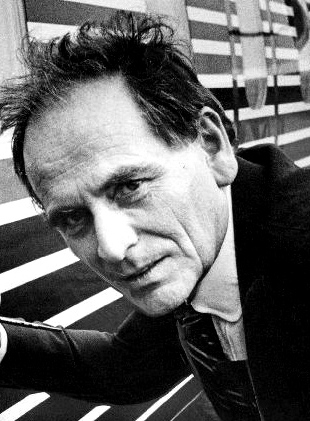
- Cardin in 1978
- Born: Pietro Costante Cardin; 2 July 1922; San Biagio di Callalta, Italy
- Died: 29 December 2020 (aged 98); Neuilly-sur-Seine, France
- Citizenship: Italy; France (after 1924)
- Occupation: Grand couturier
- Years active: 1945−2011
- Partner(s): Jeanne Moreau (1960s); André Oliver
- Awards: Grand Officer of the Order of Merit of the Italian Republic; Commander of the Legion of Honour; Commander of the National Order of Merit; Knight of the Order of Arts and Letters

Pietro Costante Cardin (Note: Italian: [ˈpjɛːtro karˈdin]; Venetian: [kaɾˈdiŋ].) (2 July 1922 – 29 December 2020), known as Pierre Cardin, (Note: UK: /ˈkɑːrdæ̃, -dæn/, US: /kɑːrˈdæ̃, -ˈdæn/; French: [pjɛʁ kaʁdɛ̃].) was an Italian-French fashion designer. He is known for what were his avant-garde style and Space Age designs. He preferred geometric shapes and motifs, often ignoring the female form. He advanced into unisex fashions, sometimes experimental, and not always practical. He founded his fashion house in 1950 and introduced the "bubble dress" in 1954.

Though he is remembered today mostly for his Space Age late '60s womenswear, during the 1960s and first half of the '70s he was better known as the top menswear designer of the time, the man who had reintroduced shaped, fitted suits to the public after a long period of looser fit in men's clothes. Cardin was often said to have been the main non-British leader of the Peacock Revolution that had begun in the UK. Retailers noted that Cardin's popularity had taught men to associate a designer's name with their clothing the way women had long done. His menswear collection from the year 1960 was so influential that the Beatles' tailor Dougie Millings copied its collarless suits for the group in 1963.

Cardin was designated a UNESCO Goodwill Ambassador in 1991, and a United Nations FAO Goodwill Ambassador in 2009.

== Career ==
Cardin was born on 2 July 1922 near Treviso in northern Italy, the son of Maria Montagner and Alessandro Cardin. His parents were wealthy wine merchants, but lost their fortune in World War I. To escape the blackshirts they left Italy and settled in Saint-Étienne, France in 1924 along with his ten siblings. His father wanted him to study architecture, but from childhood he was interested in dressmaking and at age fourteen apprenticed with Saint-Étienne tailor Louis Bompuis.

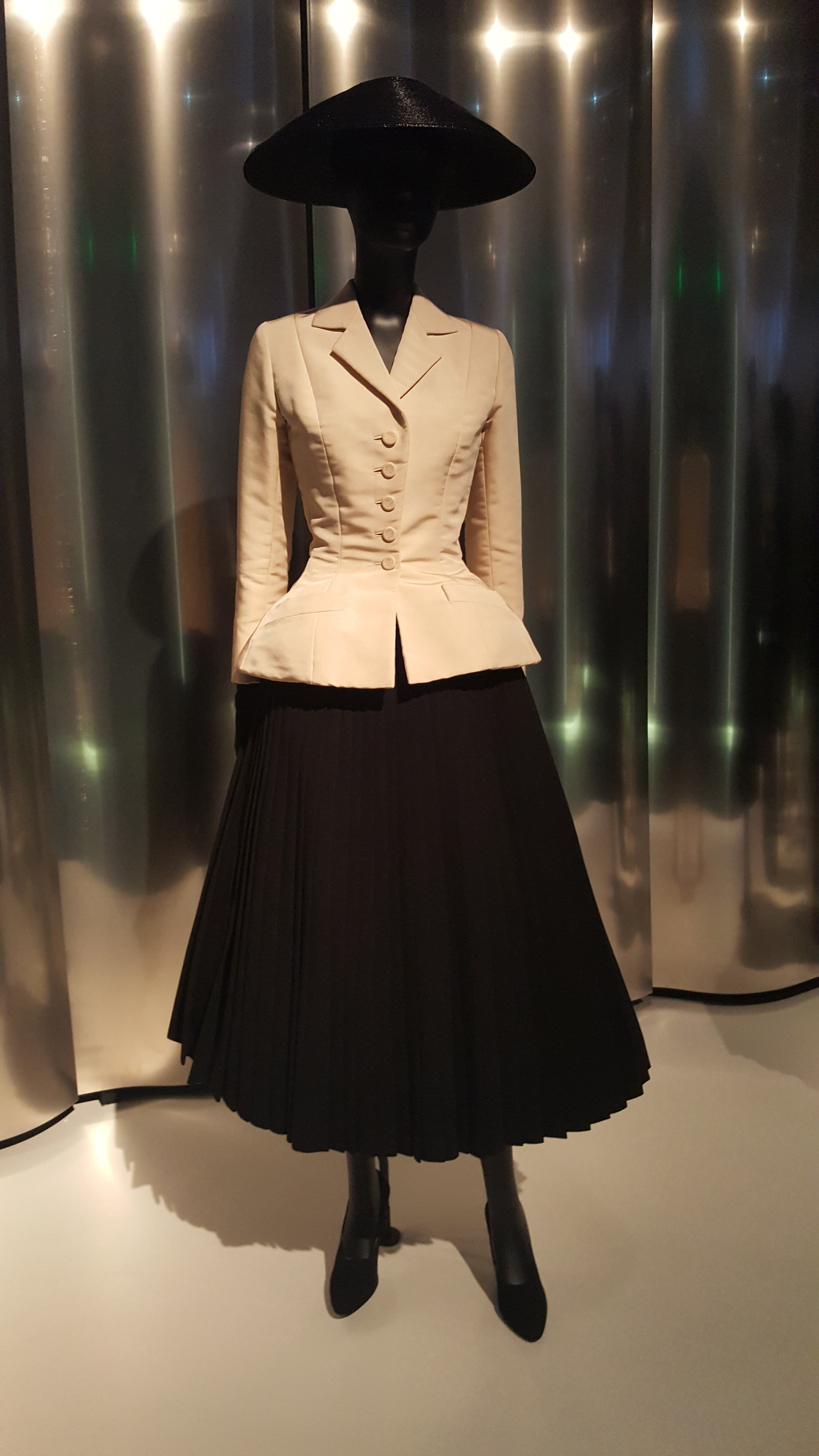
The "Bar Suit" on display at the Denver Art Museum (2019)

Cardin moved to Paris in 1945 after World War II. There, he studied architecture, briefly pursued an acting career, and met Jean Cocteau, who employed him to do costumes for his 1946 film Beauty and the Beast/La Belle et la Bête. He worked with the fashion house of Paquin, then Elsa Schiaparelli, until Jean Cocteau and Christian Berard introduced him to Christian Dior and Dior made him head of his tailleure atelier in 1947, but he was denied work at Balenciaga. While at Dior, he contributed the popular Bar suit to Dior's inaugural 1947 "Corolle" collection, already displaying the deft tailoring and pleating that he would be known for in later years. Some pieces produced at the house from 1947 to 1949 contained features that would be hallmarks of Cardin's independent work years later, notably skirts consisting of separate flying panels or blades, prophetic of skirts Cardin would produce in the late sixties and early seventies, though in very different shapes and lengths.

=== 1950s ===
Cardin founded his own fashion house in 1950. His early designs fit well into the fashion world of the time, especially his suits, which quickly attracted notice in Paris. His career was launched when he designed about 30 of the costumes for a masquerade ball in Venice, hosted by Carlos de Beistegui in 1951. The same year, Andre Oliver joined Cardin as an assistant, eventually becoming associate designer and artistic director. Cardin inaugurated his haute couture output in 1953 with his first collection of women's clothing and became a member of the Chambre Syndicale, a French association of haute couture designers. The following year he opened his first boutique, Eve, and introduced the "bubble dress", which is a short-skirted, bubble-shaped dress made by bias-cutting over a stiffened base.

For spring of 1957, he presented a more extensive couture collection than he had before and it brought him widespread international attention for the first time. The collection focused on two dress silhouettes, a long, lean, unwaisted chemise dress and one that featured what he called a "Navette" line, a high waist with fullness over the hips tapering down to a drawn-in knee. A navette is a weaving shuttle, so the skirts were vaguely spindle-shaped. Observers compared the skirt shape to an egg standing on its narrow end or to an amphora. Skirts of similar form were a rising trend among designers in France, Italy, and Spain. The Navette line also extended to coats. His tailoring ability was expressed in three different suit styles, all high-waisted. In February of that year, just after the collection debuted, Christian Dior suggested publicly that Cardin could easily become French couture's leading light, and after Dior's death that October, the fashion press considered Cardin to be one of three young designers who might rise to a position equivalent to Dior's.

Also in 1957, he opened his Adam boutique for men. By that time, alone among Paris couturiers, he had already established a name for himself in menswear, particularly for a line of small, squared-off bowties in unusual fabrics. His entry into the field paralleled the beginnings of a renaissance in creative menswear occurring in the UK, which would inspire Cardin during the following decade.

Cardin was the first couturier to turn to Japan as a high fashion market when he travelled there in 1957, and it was in Japan that he would discover one of his favorite models and muses, Hiroko Matsumoto, known professionally as Hiroko, whom the public would associate with Cardin through much of the 1960s.

After his breakthrough 1957 couture collections, Cardin's womenswear shows would be regularly covered in the world's fashion press. He continued to be recognized as a top tailor, and his late 1950s collections were noted for their accomplished presentations of a number of trends of the time: waistless dresses, geometric seaming, large collars, large buttons, shoulder interest, knee-length skirts, large tall hats, and bouffant hairstyles. These styles were accepted in Europe but considered avant-garde in the US, where Americans preferred the kind of figure-revealing forms established by Dior in 1947 and rejected the new shapes out of Europe.

Cardin also began to display at this time design elements that would become characteristic of his work for years to come. His love of pleats, cowl necklines, side closures, and batwing sleeves, for instance, already evident in the late fifties, would still be notable in his output in the 1980s. Large, upturned bowl hats set on the back of the head were also favored by him in these years and would continue to be seen in his collections into the mid-1960s.

In 1958, he showed knee-length puffball skirts, coats with similar turned-under hems, and tops that featured integral scarf constructions, a theme that Cardin would continue for much of his career. For the fall, he showed large, innovative collar treatments, high waists, bouffant millinery, and slim, somewhat Directoire eveningwear, all contributing to what he called a mushroom silhouette. His 1959 work focused on a lowered and extended shoulderline achieved via tucked sleeves; continued collar interest; dresses that were either chemises or softly bloused about a belted waist; puff-hemmed balloon skirts for evening somewhat similar to Balenciaga's of 1950; and continued large hats and bouffant hairdos.

He also presented his first women's ready-to-wear collection in 1959.

=== 1960s ===
In early 1960, Cardin showed a full menswear line for the first time. This 1960 menswear collection attracted international attention with its narrow "Cylinder" silhouette (called by some a "cigarette" shape), natural shoulders, center-vented suit jackets, foulard shirts, prominent belts, and, above all, high-buttoning, collarless suits, famously copied by the Beatles' tailor three years later.

Cardin's women's collections in the early 1960s often concentrated on more flowing lines than previously, lines that were sometimes said to be influenced by the 1930s. To his favorite pleats, batwing sleeves, cowl necklines, scarf tops, side closures, and bowl hats he added scalloping, open backs, deep decolletage, capelet collars, tailored shawls, floating panels, bias cuts, and extensive chiffon. His autumn 1960 collection was particularly well received, with a focus on slim coats, soft dresses, and extensive scalloping, paired with dramatic handbags and close-fitting, helmet-like cloche hats that looked like they were straight out of the late 1920s or early 1930s. His hems stayed mostly at the knee for daywear but were lengthened by several inches for fall of 1962, giving an even more thirties-like appearance. This fluid thirties-ish look would extend into 1965 with handkerchief hems and scalloped skirts.

Though Cardin's womenswear of the early sixties hadn't reached the Dior levels of prestige predicted for him in the late fifties, his work continued to be well received in Europe. In the US, however, his women's clothes were still considered overly avant-garde and sales remained low.

Cardin traveled to the Soviet Union for the first time in 1963, two years after the country had first sent cosmonauts into orbit and the year Valentina Tereshkova became the first woman to enter outer space. Cardin was directly inspired by seeing Tereshkova in her cosmonaut jumpsuit and helmet and would soon begin introducing into his work elements of Space Age styles.

Possible first signs of Space Age influence appeared in fall of 1963, when Cardin joined other designers in showing a more youthful silhouette consisting at base of hip-length blouson-like tops/jackets over narrow skirts hitting at the top of the knee worn with muffled collars, helmet-like or hood-like hats and caps, tights, and flat boots, with Cardin's boots reaching the knee. It was in this collection that he would first present the geometric cutouts that would become widespread by 1966. Cardin's 1963 cutouts were applied to tunics worn over slim dresses.

In 1964, he showed low-slung waists and tights that matched upper garments, including patterned tights matching patterned tops, a characteristic trend of the mid-sixties, and he began adding simple, top-of-the-knee A-line shift dresses emblazoned with large geometric shapes such as targets, as Paris picked up on London's Mod boutique culture of the early 1960s. He also showed the lowest necklines of his career, with décolletage on evening dresses reaching well below the waist but impropriety averted by inserting panels of flesh-toned fabric.

Perhaps surprisingly for a designer considered avant-garde, Cardin resisted and even denounced pants for women as they rose in popularity in the mid-sixties after André Courrèges promoted them for everyday wear in 1964, a stance Cardin would maintain until 1968.

Cardin launched a men's ready-to-wear line in 1964 that included numerous turtlenecks, a garment that would become a mainstay of men's fashion during the decade. By 1965, his men's suits had evolved into a more shaped, fitted style, usually three-piece, sometimes double-breasted, featuring longer jackets with marked waists, deeper vents, and wider lapels on both jackets and vests; and slim pants with a slight flare below the knee. Ties were wider. Shirts were colored or striped and had more prominent collars. Footwear was often an ankle-high boot style that came to be associated with Cardin, designed to maintain a clean line while concealing the socks. This silhouette was inspired by the Mod menswear trends of the UK.

In 1965, he shortened all of his day skirts to mid-thigh or higher and moved further into a Space Age look, with conical dresses, coats, and capes featuring high, geometric collars and hoods and prominent hem-banding, all worn with geometric headgear, tights, and flat shoes, sometimes with spats. Short, softer chemise dresses were also shown, and eveningwear turned on long, easy, sweatery T-shirt dresses shimmering with sequins in bands of bright hues. He brought in more East Asians as models, notably Cambodian Nom Srey Neang.

By 1966, Cardin favored an even closer fit for his menswear; slightly wider, more squared, yet unpadded shoulders on longer jackets; two-piece or three-piece suits, the vests now sans lapels; inverted pleats for jackets instead of vents; higher shirt collars; larger tie knots on even wider ties; and flared pants cut slightly longer in the back to visually lengthen the leg. Turtlenecks were now presented even for evening, a trend that would become characteristic of the second half of the decade. More casual clothes were also slim, even tight, and featured turtlenecks, jackets with zippers closing fronts and pockets, trousers with stripes along the outer seam, and prominent belts, with summer clothes more colorful and including striped shirts worn open enough to expose the chest and flared pants with colorful side stripes. All of this became very influential and popular, including in the US.

Cardin resigned from the Chambre Syndicale in 1966 and began showing his collections in his own venue. He also designed uniforms for Pakistan International Airlines, which were introduced from 1966 to 1971 and became an instant hit.

Cardin had entered his Space Age phase by 1966, as had much of the rest of the fashion world following the launch of the Soviet Union's space program, André Courrèges's landmark 1964 and '65 collections, and the widespread influence of Britain's Mod culture. His menswear collections now also included a Cosmonaut or Cosmocorps line characterized by jumpsuits, hip-belted tunics, and tights-like or flared trousers, all with prominent, often ring-pulled zippers and ultra-modern boots that sometimes rose to the knee.

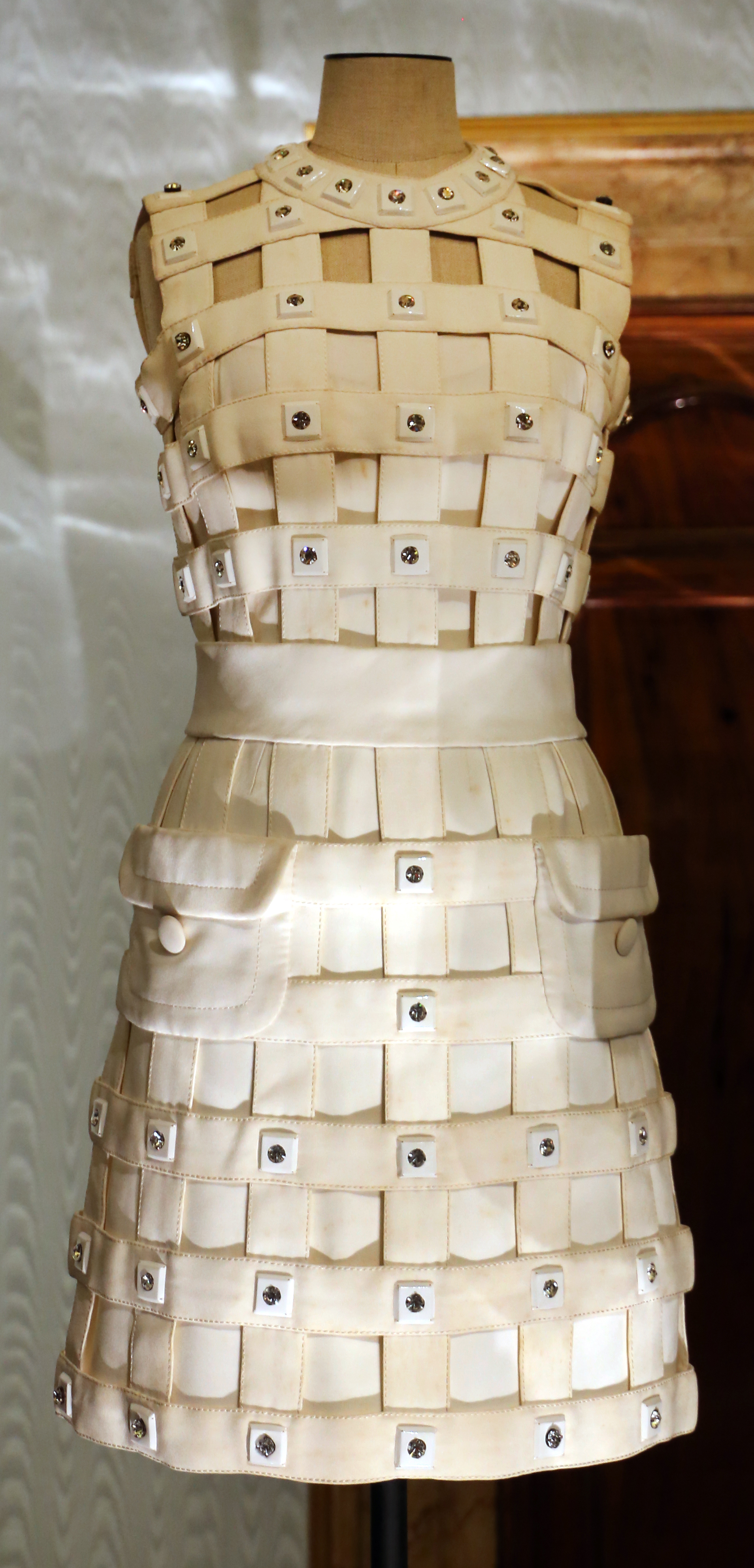
Pierre cardin, abito, in seta, plastica e strass, 1960

His Space Age womenswear of 1966 featured mini lengths, extensive cutouts, geometric necklines, rolled hems and collars, and cutaway shoulders. He was the leading advocate of cutouts and prominent zippers as those details peaked among designers in 1966. His cutouts included bare midriffs overlain with geometric shapes. He liked geometric diamond forms, jackets that fell to a low triangular peak at the bottom of the front closure, T-bar cutout necklines, metal neck rings anchoring shift dresses, and the large-scale targets, circles, and triangles that were popular at the time across simple A-line shift minidresses. Colors ranged from vivid and graphic to warm and autumnal. He presented a few unusual dirndl-gathered miniskirts of a bell or barrel shape slightly bolstered with minute lace petticoats and given bounce with a stiffened rolled hem that may have presaged Cardin's experimentation with hooped minis in the 1970s and '80s. That year, he showed tights and shoes that matched his miniskirts, often having them all exactly the same color, a combination he felt made mini lengths more wearable for women of various ages. He also introduced the combination of jumper minidress over a bodystocking or over turtleneck and tights, a functional dress scheme also favored by other designers of the period and one that Cardin would continue to show well into the seventies. His jumper minidresses of 1966 often featured deeply cutaway shoulders, geometric cutouts, and suspender-like straps somewhat reminiscent of the suspender minis Courrèges had shown in 1965. Shoes were flat and square-toed in the dominant style of the time. Cardin's 1966 Space Age look was completed by dome-shaped hats and flaring, helmet-like, geometric headwear that covered the entire head except for the eyes and resembled similar styles shown by Rudi Gernreich in 1964. He made his penchant for scalloped edges fit the new geometric mode by making the scallops prominent and oversized on the hem or the leading edge of asymmetric jacket closures that often fastened on the far side, as Cardin had long preferred, but now were closed with tabs. Fabrics were often the substantial double-faced ones of the period also favored by Courrèges.

Cardin made capes and ponchos look futuristic via geometric circular or square armholes and precisely curvilinear arches cut into the sides for the arms. Cape and poncho sleeves were also shown. He adapted his love of asymmetric hems, earlier a part of his 1930s look, to the new Space Age period by showing hemlines that were shorter on one side than the other, sometimes called a tilted hem, seen especially on evening dresses; miniskirts longer in the front than in the back; skirts consisting of strips, panels, and loops of fabric of various lengths and widths, some petal-like; pleated skirts with fluted hems that curled up and down; and other unusual forms. These trends became particularly notable beginning in 1967. The skirts of strips, loops, and panels would be shown through 1970.

Interest in Space Age looks would peak in mainstream fashion during 1966 and part of 1967 and then most designers would move into other areas. Cardin was one of a small group of designers who remained enamored of futuristic Space Age looks for several more years. The best known of these designers were André Courrèges, Rudi Gernreich, Emanuel Ungaro, and Paco Rabanne, all of whom tied their ideas of the future to mini lengths. Cardin's work was noted for including a variety of lengths from 1967 on, particularly his characteristic asymmetric hems, while keeping it all futuristic-looking.

His 1967 women's collections continued with zippers, pleating, side closures, scallops, jumper minidresses, one-shouldered evening dresses, geometric necklines, sculptural metal collars, rolled hems and edges, and other familiar Cardin features and added diagonal closures, a greater variety of geometric pockets, and metal or metal-looking plastic used for tab closures, wide belts, ring collars, and hem bands. For fall, he included deeply flaring, Medieval-looking sleeves. frog closings, large collars that framed the head from the back, complexly gored skirts, front lacing on jackets and coats, coats with big, colored circles on them with matching deep hems of fox dyed to match the circles, completely sunburst-pleated capes, and more black than usual. Many of his silhouettes were in the flared trapeze/A-line/conical shapes widespread at the time.

His Space Age womenswear during these few years was in line with the mood of the design world and became very influential, even in the US, where new Cardin women's boutiques opened in prominent department stores. By 1967, some of his adult styles for both men and women were also offered in juniors' and children's sizes.

HIs menswear from the last three years of the decade enjoyed a mass audience, still outselling his womenswear by a large margin. He continued with his shaped, fitted, wide-lapelled, wide-tied, flared-leg suits, plus lots of zippers and turtlenecks for more casual clothes. His Cosmonaut outfits grew in popularity, consisting of fitted, belted, often sleeveless tunics over slim, often flared trousers in various fabrics, paired with turtlenecks and boots.

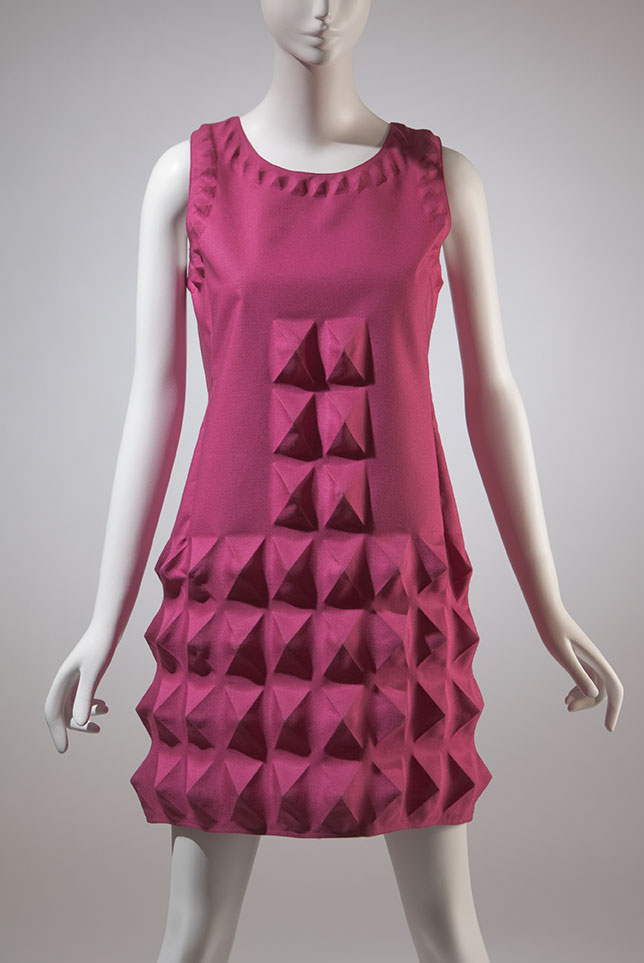
Pierre Cardin dress, made from heat-moulded Dynel, 1968

Cardin continued with his futuristic womenswear in 1968, showing synthetic outfits of molded Cardine fabric whose surfaces stood out in geometric forms, garments that formed stark geometric shapes when the arms were held out to the sides, metallic silver leather, phosphorescent fabrics (also shown by Paco Rabanne), light-up electric dresses (also shown by Diana Dew), increased use of metal, and extensive use of cutouts, sometimes directly over each breast. He used vinyl and other forms of plastic liberally. He and fellow futurist André Courrèges favored a basic, versatile dress scheme of ribknit bodystocking or turtleneck and tights under various forms of jumper minidresses or microminiskirts. Some of Cardin's footwear from 1967 to 1969 was provided by François Villon, including the thigh- or hip-high leather or vinyl stretch boots that were popular with designers at the end of the sixties, Cardin's often paired with matching geometric bonnet-hats and his Space Age-looking geometric minidresses and turtlenecks.

He finally showed women's trousers in 1968, initially as part of his unisex clothes, an important trend of this enlightened era. He produced identical tunics, turtlenecks, flared trousers, hip belts, and boots for both sexes, and also made ribknit jumpsuits/bodystockings and ribknit trousers for women that extended into a thickened flare over the top of the foot. He now applied his favorite batwing sleeves to jumpsuits that formed a geometric triangle shape when the arms were extended to the sides.

Also in 1968, Cardin opened a furniture and interior decor store called Environnement.

In 1969, his futuristic looks were augmented by Space Age belt fastenings covered by transparent plastic domes; chrome-shiny geometric jewelry and belt buckles; leather added to his continued use of vinyl; newly trapunto-stitched versions of his face-framing collars; additional trapunto detailing; and plush ring-hoods. He adopted the long, lean, fit-and-flare look of sleek knits also favored by Yves Saint Laurent at the time, with calf-length skirts, turtlenecks, skullcap-like headgear, and hip-slung belts. He also continued with his more flowing, diaphanous looks like masterfully bias-cut skirts, asymmetric hems, floating panels, and ponchos and capes, now making ponchos into skirts and dresses and adding shawls and shawl-like jackets. He included maxiskirts among his variety of skirt lengths, believing that they had become popular because women were now used to covered legs again with the ubiquity of women's trousers. Miniskirts were offered as well in this year when the rest of the fashion world joined his long advocacy of choice in hemlines. His long love of pleats was seen in both his futuristic styles and his more flowing garments, and his love of decolletage and Directoire lines was taken to extremes in his eveningwear of the end of the decade.

Cardin's attitude toward fashion shows varied. In the mid-sixties, he added two additional private client showings to his normal biannual couture shows, but he also disliked being expected to have so many shows per year and by the end of the decade would be known for fewer shows but with many more outfits presented than other designers, into the hundreds of pieces, resulting in very long fashion shows in which models walked very fast to save time, a tendency that would continue into the seventies.

==== 1960s film and TV costuming ====
After launching his design career doing costumes for Jean Cocteau's 1946 film La Belle et La Bête, Cardin would return to costuming in the 1960s and outfit several films, mostly those starring close friend Jeanne Moreau. These included Joseph Losey's Eva (1962), Marcel Ophüls's Banana Peel (1963), Jean-Louis Richard's Mata Hari, Agent H21 (1964), Anthony Asquith's The Yellow Rolls-Royce (1964), Louis Malle's Viva Maria! (1965), and François Truffaut's The Bride Wore Black (1968). Those not featuring Moreau included Anthony Asquith's The V.I.P.s (1963) and Anthony Mann's A Dandy in Aspic (1968). For François Truffaut's influential 1962 film Jules et Jim, star Jeanne Moreau wore several Cardin pieces that were from her own wardrobe.

Cardin also created Patrick MacNee's costumes for season five of UK television series The Avengers, airing in 1967.

=== 1970s ===
In the first half of the 1970s, Cardin was still the most prominent menswear designer in the world, but the menswear revolution he had helped foster in the 1960s was just about over and by the mid-seventies his menswear would be more subdued. His womenswear was still in line with mainstream fashion in the earliest seventies, sometimes considered as influential as Yves Saint Laurent's, but by the mid-seventies it would be somewhat out of step with mainstream women's fashion and would be considered eccentric, though he did reflect some of the trends of the period. He continued to produce enormous fashion shows with hundreds of outfits, so there was plenty of variety to encompass a number of looks. He became better known in the mid-seventies for licensing his name for all kinds of products. Toward the end of the decade, he would regain some influence in womenswear as his interpretations of the big-shoulder-pads trend would coincide with what other designers were doing and bring him renewed attention.

As in the rest of the world, Cardin's reputation in the Soviet Union had grown since his first trip there in 1963, and during the seventies he would be known as the most prominent non-Soviet designer in the country, a favorite of celebrated figures in the arts and politics.

By the early seventies, artistic director Andre Oliver had been given responsibility for Cardin's ready-to-wear lines, specialty lines, and for Cardin collections tailored to various national markets, the clothes always adaptations of Cardin's couture collections.

Though no longer groundbreaking as it had been in the early 1960s and during the Mod era of the mid-sixties, Cardin's early seventies menswear was still influential and popular, characterized by high armholes, large collars, double-breasted jackets, and high closures, all of which were now widespread menswear trends that Cardin had helped establish.

Cardin's early seventies womenswear continued in the direction he was headed in the late sixties: a variety of lengths; skirts consisting of slits, slashes, panels, strips, loops, and asymmetric hems; ribknit tops; flaring sleeves; capes and ponchos; jumper dresses from mini to knee-length worn with bodystockings or turtleneck and tights; leather sections; geometric patch pockets; and an expansion of the women's trousers he had first shown in 1968. He continued to design in a Space Age style, one of just a handful of designers to do so by the early seventies, using a lot of vinyl and geometric cutouts in the earliest years of the decade. Throughout the seventies, his long-favored cowl necklines, batwing sleeves, and pleating were signature elements of his work, as were the gracefully cut chiffon skirts he had been perfecting since the early sixties. These skirts would fit into trends particularly of the middle of the decade, when their tiers and flounces would find expression in other fabrics.

In the year 1970, the fashion industry tried to reduce women's skirt choices to just midcalf-hemmed midi skirts. Cardin showed exclusively that length in his ready-to-wear collections but varied lengths in his couture collections, from micromini to ankle length, while close friend and Cardin aficionado Jeanne Moreau intimated that Cardin felt that longer skirts tended to age women.

As haute couture began to decline, ready-to-wear ('prêt-à-porter') soared as well as Cardin's designs. He was the first to combine the "mini" and the "maxi" skirts of the 1970s by introducing a new hemline that had long pom-pom panels or fringes.

Beginning in the 1970s, Cardin set another new trend: "mod chic". This trend holds true for the form or for a combination of forms, which did not exist at the time. He was the first to combine extremely short and ankle-length pieces. He made dresses with slits and batwing sleeves with novel dimensions and mixed circular movement and gypsy skirts with structured tops. These creations allowed for the geometric shapes that captivated him to be contrasted, with both circular and straight lines. Cardin became an icon for starting this popular fashion movement of the early 1970s.

He designed a handful of Space Age-looking nurses' uniforms in 1970 that featured skullcap- and Medieval-looking headgear and the variety of skirt lengths he was showing in his collections at the time, including ankle-length maxiskirts and loincloth-looking miniskirts worn over sometimes revealing translucent bodystockings.

Inspired by space travel and exploration, Cardin visited NASA (the National Aeronautics and Space Administration) in 1970, where he tried on the original spacesuit worn by the first human to set foot on the Moon, Neil Armstrong. Cardin designed spacesuits for NASA in 1970.

His early seventies women's trousers were often narrow and of knit fabric and included cropped versions to wear with the popular boots of the time, a period during which women were wearing knickers and gauchos for the same purpose. He continued to show jumpsuits, including some in skin-tight vinyl. Other Cardin trousers of the early seventies featured unusual seaming.

At the same time that Cardin was showing futuristic looks, he also drew from past eras and presented sheath skirts and tight-bodiced tailored jackets in silhouettes from the 1950s, though the sheath skirts differed from 1950s sheath skirts in being unlined and worn without slips or girdles, revealing the pantylines of the models' 1970s-style pantyhose and underwear. Shown by Cardin from 1970 to 1976, these vaguely retro-looking skin-tight, unlined skirts did not catch on during the casual, liberated early seventies, when restricting women's movements in tight skirts was considered regressive, but unlined sheath skirts would find favor in the early 1980s, most famously in the work of Azzedine Alaïa, as well as in the more slouchy tube skirts put out by London designers like BodyMap in the mid-1980s.

Many up-and-coming designers apprenticed with Cardin, including Jean-Paul Gaultier in 1970.

In 1971, Cardin put an emphasis on miniskirts of different cuts than he'd been showing in recent years, many split at the sides, and included short shorts with them as part of that year's hot pants trend, while continuing to show longer lengths as well. Bare-armed, knee-length dresses with extended cap sleeves resembling shoulder flanges were notable, a style he would show through 1973. Some of his early seventies minidresses were in the form of tunics. Other tunic dresses in various lengths were shown for all hours, either alone or over trousers.

HIs couture collections continued to feature geometric shapes, with clothes cut to form squares, circles, or triangles when the arms were held out to the sides. In 1971, he emphasized the motif of a circle at the end of a long, rectangular strip, a sort of geometric pendulum form that he would put at the ends of belts, sleeves, and pant legs.

Other Cardin womenswear from 1971 was made with high, tight, constraining waistbands, some cinched, even on jeans, which was very out of step with the times. Another indulgence of his that was considered anachronistic in the early to mid-seventies was big ballgowns, which Cardin produced from 1971 onward in taffetas and other traditionally dressy fabrics. Fellow former Space Age designer André Courrèges also iconoclastically produced big ballgowns at the time, a very casual period during which women might wear jeans and t-shirts even for important events. Grand ballgowns of this type wouldn't return to mainstream fashion until the end of the seventies.

He met Soviet ballerina Maya Plisetskaya in 1971 at Avignon. She would become a friend and muse, wearing his clothes and inviting him to costume multiple productions.

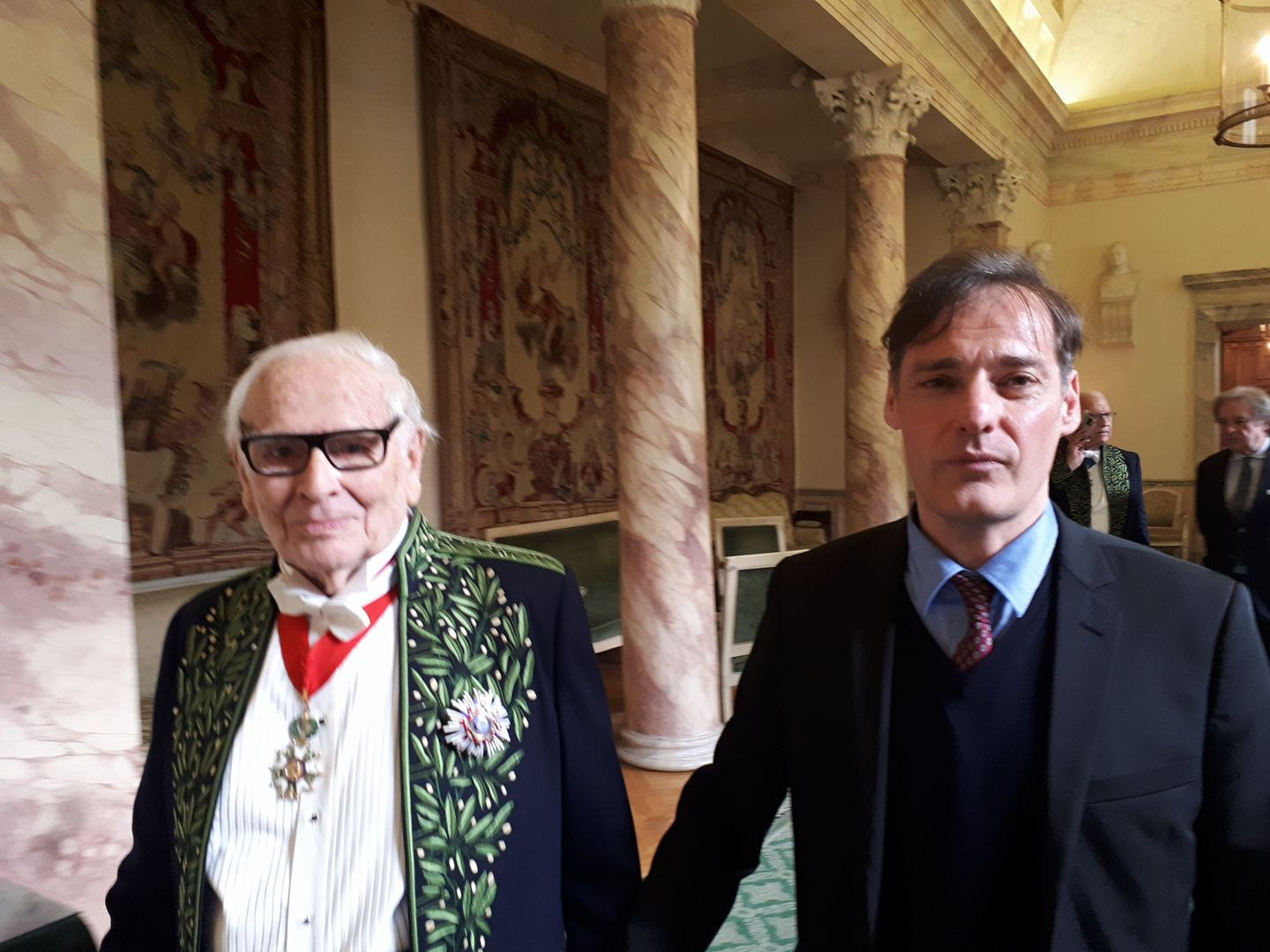
Pierre Cardin and the French composer Régis Campo, from Académie des beaux-arts, Institut de France, Paris, 2017

In 1971, Cardin redesigned the barong tagalog, a national costume of the Philippines, by opening the front, removing the cuffs that needed cufflinks, flaring the sleeves, and minimizing the embroidery. It was also tapered to the body, in contrast with the traditional loose-fitting design, and it also had a thicker collar with sharp and pointed cuffs. A straight-cut design was favored by President Ferdinand Marcos.

Some of Cardin's skirts starting in 1972, including miniskirts, had hoops, ranging from two or three widely separated hoops in the skirt of a minidress to multiple hoops very close together near the hem of an evening gown that moved up and down as the wearer walked. The point of these hoops seemed to be a particular kind of movement. They were largely not the big, silhouette-enlarging hoops seen in the 1860s but hoops that stood out only a little from the slim lines of the skirt. Like his sheath skirts from the same time period, these never caught on among the comfort-conscious seventies public and they were confined to Cardin's runways, but he would continue to play with the idea into the 1980s, when designer Vivienne Westwood would receive attention for her wire-framed mid-eighties crinoline miniskirts.

Cardin's fashion shows, both couture and ready-to-wear, continued to contain many more garments than other designers' shows. As ready-to-wear came to outshine haute couture during the 1970s, Cardin was one of several designers who considered doing away with open couture shows entirely, nearly doing so in 1972 when he, Yves Saint Laurent, and a few others declared that they would stop presenting separate public couture shows for spring and instead show their couture lines with their ready-to-wear collections and then changed their minds.

In 1973, Cardin's backdrop at the joint French-US fashion show held at Versailles was a spaceship, while other designers chose bucolic or nostalgic scenes. He continued with some Space Age womenswear styles into 1974. By that date, the main vestiges of his Space Age looks were his jumper dresses over turtleneck-and-tights or bodystocking, a very versatile, serviceable way of dressing that fit the practical mood of the period.

By 1973, the larger fashion industry had moved toward exclusively below-knee skirts, with calf lengths preferred. Cardin also featured skirts of that length, but he would also be one of very few designers, Courrèges most notably, to carry on including miniskirts in his collections even during their mid-seventies nadir.

In other designs, he did conform to some of the trends of the time, including more natural fibers; layering; fuller cuts; full, flounced, below-knee skirts of light fabrics; harem pants, harem skirts, and harem tops; and a variety of full trousers and tapered trousers; plus athletic gear like jogging outfits and tenniswear. Cardin's penchant for deep sleeve cuts, capes, and ponchos adapted well to the mid-seventies Big Look period, aside from some cape tops that immobilized the upper arms. The voluminous shapes of mid-seventies high fashion included an emphasis on versatility, with designers producing dresses and other garments that could be wrapped, knotted, and tied in a variety of ways, tendencies Cardin also indulged in at the time. He brought out innovative pieces that contained one pants leg and the rest of the garment a skirt, as well as overgarments that had a sleeve on one side and a cape on the other side that could be tied on the opposite shoulder over the single sleeve. He used his preferred ribknit for convertible necklines during this period.

He put his name on a line of infants' clothes in 1975.

In 1975, Cardin opened a furniture boutique on the Rue du Faubourg Saint-Honoré, having earlier introduced the Environnement furniture store in 1968. In 1977, 1979, and 1983, he was awarded the Cartier Golden Thimble by French haute couture for the most creative collection of the season. He was a member of the Chambre Syndicale de la Haute Couture et du Prêt-à-Porter from 1953 to 1993.

In 1976, Cardin's position as most influential menswear designer began to be eclipsed by Giorgio Armani, who was just becoming a name among the fashion cognoscenti. Cardin's clothes by that time had followed the trends of the period and become more sedate. He was beginning to shorten his men's jackets, narrow lapels slightly, and broaden the shoulders, a direction that would continue until it became an industry trend at the end of the decade.

Cardin's first American-made, mass-produced home furnishing collection came in 1977 when Cardin partnered with Dillingham Manufacturing Company, Scandinavian Folklore Carpets of Denmark for Ege Rya Inc., and the Laurel Lamp Company.

In 1977, Cardin simplified and made more accessible the haute couture process by introducing "prêt-couture," off-the-rack hand-made clothes that customers could acquire with only one fitting and a price intermediate between his ready-to-wear and couture lines.

For fall of 1978, much of the fashion industry moved away from voluminous, unconstructed, versatile shapes in womenswear and toward prominently padded shoulders and more tailored clothing in styles that were often derived from the 1940s, a tendency that was referred to as retro at the time. The retro emphasis included ideas of futuristic dress from the 1930s, '40s, and '50s, with Flash Gordon and Buck Rogers frequently mentioned, most famously in the work of Thierry Mugler and Claude Montana. This was not the minimalistic, intellectual Space Age look influenced by modern art that had prevailed in the 1960s in the work of Cardin and others but something older, consisting of shoulder flanges and trapunto-stitched jumpsuits. Some of Cardin's work from this big-shoulders period would contribute to this retro-futuristic mode. His tailoring expertise and preference for bold silhouettes fit into the renewed emphasis on structure and he received increased press attention for his clothes, his shoulders some of the broadest in Paris and his suits some of the most severely tailored.

In 1979, Cardin was appointed a consultant to China's agency for trade in textiles, and in March of that year, he became the first Western designer to present a fashion show in China in many decades.

In early 1979, Cardin contributed pagoda shoulders to the fashion lexicon. These may have been influenced by his increased trips to China over the previous year. The look would influence other designers for fall of 1979, as many sharpened the edges of their shoulder pads and sometimes turned them up, most notably Claude Montana. Like Montana, Cardin would present some of the largest shoulders in the industry into the mid-1980s, but Cardin only focused on pagoda shoulders for a brief period in 1979, when he put them in his menswear as well as his womenswear. Despite their brief tenure and limited public adoption, pagoda shoulders would be one of Cardin's most referenced styles in later decades.

His women's collections continued to include the pleats and asymmetric hemlines that Cardin had loved for well over a decade. Particularly well received were full, knee-length tent-chemise dresses in ruffled taffeta for evening, as they were both in line with the renewed emphasis on glamor and comfortably wearable. He would show these into the early eighties. The ballgowns and mini lengths from Cardin that had been out of style in the broader fashion world for most of the seventies came back in with designers in 1979, with miniskirts presented in a variety of shapes and styles, including sixties-revival looks. Cardin's enormous fashion presentations encompassed a number of variable styles.

His menswear of the last two years of the seventies reached the apogee of the increased-shoulder-width direction he was already headed in the mid-seventies, with shoulders broadened with padding, narrower lapels to increase the impression of shoulder width, and tapered jacket shapes. Cardin would present this broad-shouldered men's silhouette through much of the following decade.

=== 1980s and later ===
In the early 1980s, Cardin considered reducing his fashion showings to only one per year, but never actually did it. Even so, his shows remained huge in size. Cardin's womenswear of the 1980s was characteristically diverse, but it did fit more with the trends of the time, reflecting the return to glamorous eveningwear, the rise of black as the basic fashion color, and, in the second half of the decade, more stretch fabrics.

These large collections would include a mixture of practical, multi-seasonal outfits and more experimental forms including irregular, stepped sleeves, pleating, capes, scarf cuts, and asymmetric hems. The China influence that had been seen in Cardin's pagoda shoulders of the late seventies also found expression in the early eighties in his longstanding finely pleated skirts with fluted hems, now constructed to rise in pagoda-like peaks at intervals around the hem.

Through the mid-eighties, he continued to embrace the huge shoulders that the fashion world began to promote in 1978, his shoulders rivaling Claude Montana's in width and incorporating the geometric shapes that Cardin favored. Like other eighties designers, he showed his large-shouldered tops with short, narrow skirts.

The diverse shapes of 1980s miniskirts were well suited to Cardin's experimentation. He played even more with hoops and wiring than he had in the seventies, putting them in both sleeves and skirts. While these still never really caught on with the public, avant-garde designers like Vivienne Westwood and Georgina Godley also wired skirts and hems on occasion during the decade, and singer Kate Pierson of popular music group the B-52's wore a hoop-hemmed miniskirt on the cover of their 1983 Whammy! album that may have been inspired by Cardin.

Cardin's licensing empire expanded to encompass hundreds of items during the eighties, bringing in millions of dollars, but his womenswear was no longer considered by fashion insiders to be within the mainstream of influence that it had been in the late 1960s and early seventies. His fame in the Soviet Union, however, continued to rise, his clothes worn by the likes of Maya Plisetskaya and Raisa Gorbachev.

His 1980s menswear was no longer pace-setting as it had been in the 1960s, the role of pace-setter having been usurped by Giorgio Armani, but it continued with the avant-garde big shoulders and tapered jackets and trousers that he had shown in the late seventies, a general trend of the time that was most exaggerated by Claude Montana, Thierry Mugler, and Cardin, all of whom also added occasional retro space-age touches. As with his womenswear, he always included more wearable clothes with his more unusual pieces.

In 1981, Cardin acquired Maxim's. He introduced Maxim's to Beijing in 1983, where it was among the first international brands to operate in mainland China and became an enduring cultural landmark.

Like many other designers today, Cardin decided in 1994 to show his collection only to a small circle of selected clients and journalists. After a break of 15 years, he showed a new collection to a group of 150 journalists at his bubble home in Cannes.

A biography titled Pierre Cardin, his fabulous destiny was written by Sylvana Lorenz.

A documentary on Cardin's life and career, House of Cardin directed by P. David Ebersole and Todd Hughes premiered to a standing ovation on 6 September 2019 at the 76th Venice International Film Festival in the Giornate degli Autori section, with Mr. Cardin in attendance.

== Muses ==
Cardin had several muses who inspired his designs over the years, including model Hiroko Matsumoto, actress Jeanne Moreau, cosmonaut Valentina Tereshkova, and ballerina Maya Plisetskaya. Model Betty Catroux, a muse to several designers, commonly wore Cardin during the late sixties, including at her wedding in 1968. In the 1950s and early sixties, Cardin occasionally dressed Jacqueline Bouvier Kennedy.

== Eponymous brand ==
Pierre Cardin used his name as a brand, initially a prestigious fashion brand that he extended successfully in the 1960s into perfumes and cosmetics, adding furniture and home decor in 1968. He acquired new products for licensure rapidly during the 1970s, his name found on over 2,000 products by the end of the decade, items ranging from bicycle accessories to wine to cookware to home furnishings to heaters to blow dryers. He would continue to add licensees during the following decade, even showing them all together in a four-day event in Beijing in 1983. From about 1988 the brand was licensed extensively, and appeared on "wildly nonadjacent products such as baseball caps and cigarettes".

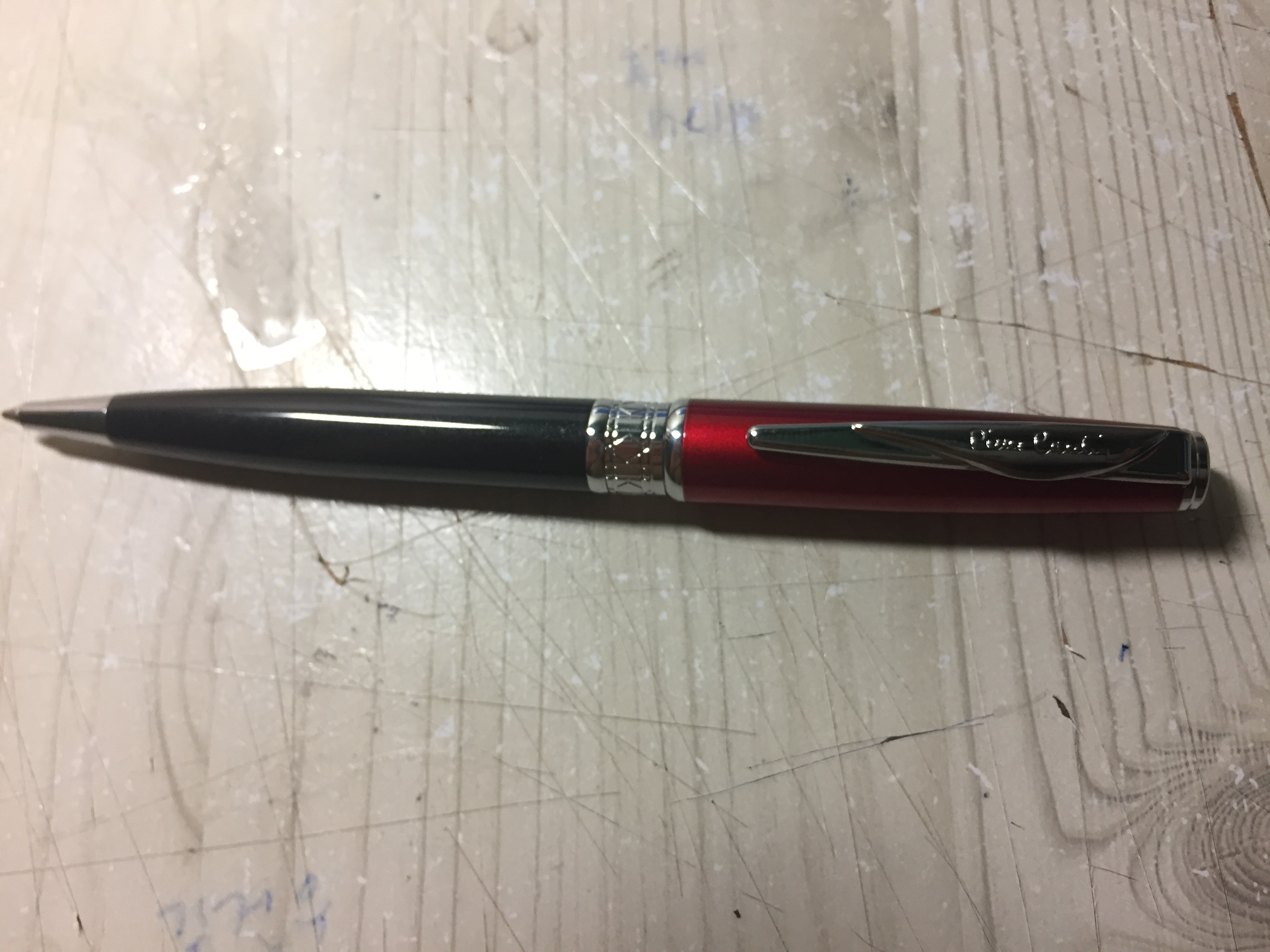
Pierre Cardin-branded pen

A 2005 article in the Harvard Business Review commented that the extension into perfumes and cosmetics was successful as the premium nature of the Pierre Cardin brand transferred well into these new, adjacent categories, but that the owners of the brand mistakenly attributed this to the brand's strength rather than to its fit with the new product categories. The extensive licensing eroded the high-end perception of the brand, but was lucrative; in 1986 Women's Wear Daily (WWD) estimated Cardin's annual income at over US$10 million.

In 1995, quotes from WWD included "Pierre Cardin—he has sold his name for toilet paper. At what point do you lose your identity?" and "Cardin's cachet crashed when his name appeared on everything from key chains to pencil holders". However, the Cardin name was still very profitable, although the indiscriminate licensing approach was considered a failure.

In 2011, Cardin tried to sell his business, valuing it at €1 billion, although the Wall Street Journal considered it to be worth about a fifth of that amount. Ultimately he did not sell the brand.

== Automobiles ==
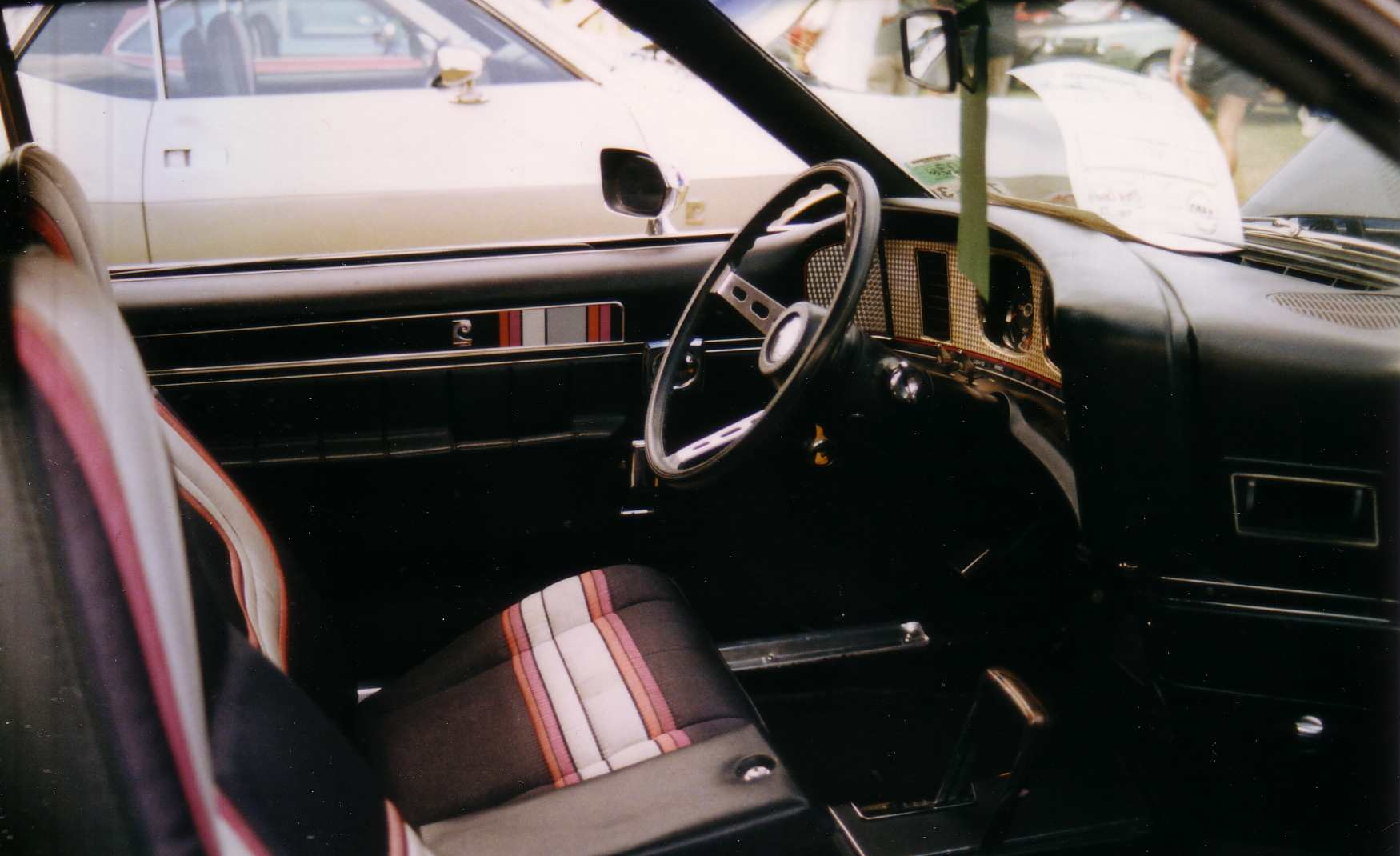
Cardin interior in a 1972 AMC Javelin

Cardin entered industrial design by developing thirteen basic design "themes" that would be applied to various products, each consistently recognizable and carrying his name and logo. He expanded into new markets that "to most Paris fashion designers ... is rank heresy."

The business initiatives included a contract with American Motors Corporation (AMC). Following the success of the Aldo Gucci designed Hornet Sportabout station wagon interiors, the automaker incorporated Cardin's theme on the AMC Javelin starting in mid-1972. This was one of the first American cars to offer a special trim package created by a famous French fashion designer. It was daring and outlandish design "with some of the wildest fabrics and patterns ever seen in any American car".

The original sales estimate by AMC was for 2,500 haute couture "pony" and muscle cars. The special interior option was continued on the 1973 model year Javelins. During the two model years, a total of 4,152 AMC Javelins received this bold mirrored, multi-colored pleated stripe pattern in tones of Chinese red, plum, white, and silver that were set against a black background. The Cardin Javelins also came with the designer's emblems on the front fenders and had a limited selection of exterior colors (Trans Am Red, Snow White, Stardust Silver, Diamond Blue, and Wild Plum) to coordinate with the special interiors. However, 12 Cardin optioned cars were special ordered in Midnight Black paint.

Prior to working with AMC, Cardin collaborated with French automaker Simca to produce a Cardin edition of the Simca 1100, released in 1969 for the 1970 model year.

== Other interests ==
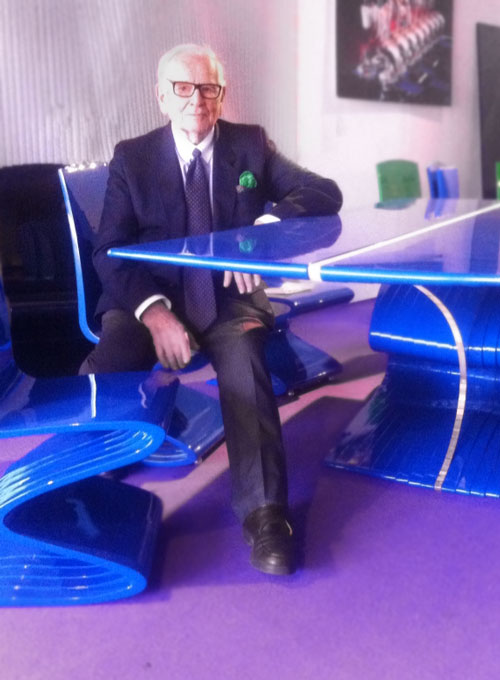
Pierre Cardin with the "utilitarian sculptures" Cobra Table and chair, 2012

Cardin owned a palazzo in Venice named Ca' Bragadin. Although he claimed that this house was once owned by Giacomo Casanova, some scholars have argued that it was owned by another branch of the Bragadin family, and that its usage by Casanova was "somewhat unlikely".

== Personal life ==
Cardin self-identified as being mostly gay, but in the 1960s he had a four-year relationship with actress Jeanne Moreau. His long-term business partner and life partner was fellow French fashion designer André Oliver, who died in 1993.

=== Death ===
Cardin died on 29 December 2020, at the American Hospital of Paris, in Neuilly-sur-Seine, at the age of 98. No cause of death was given.

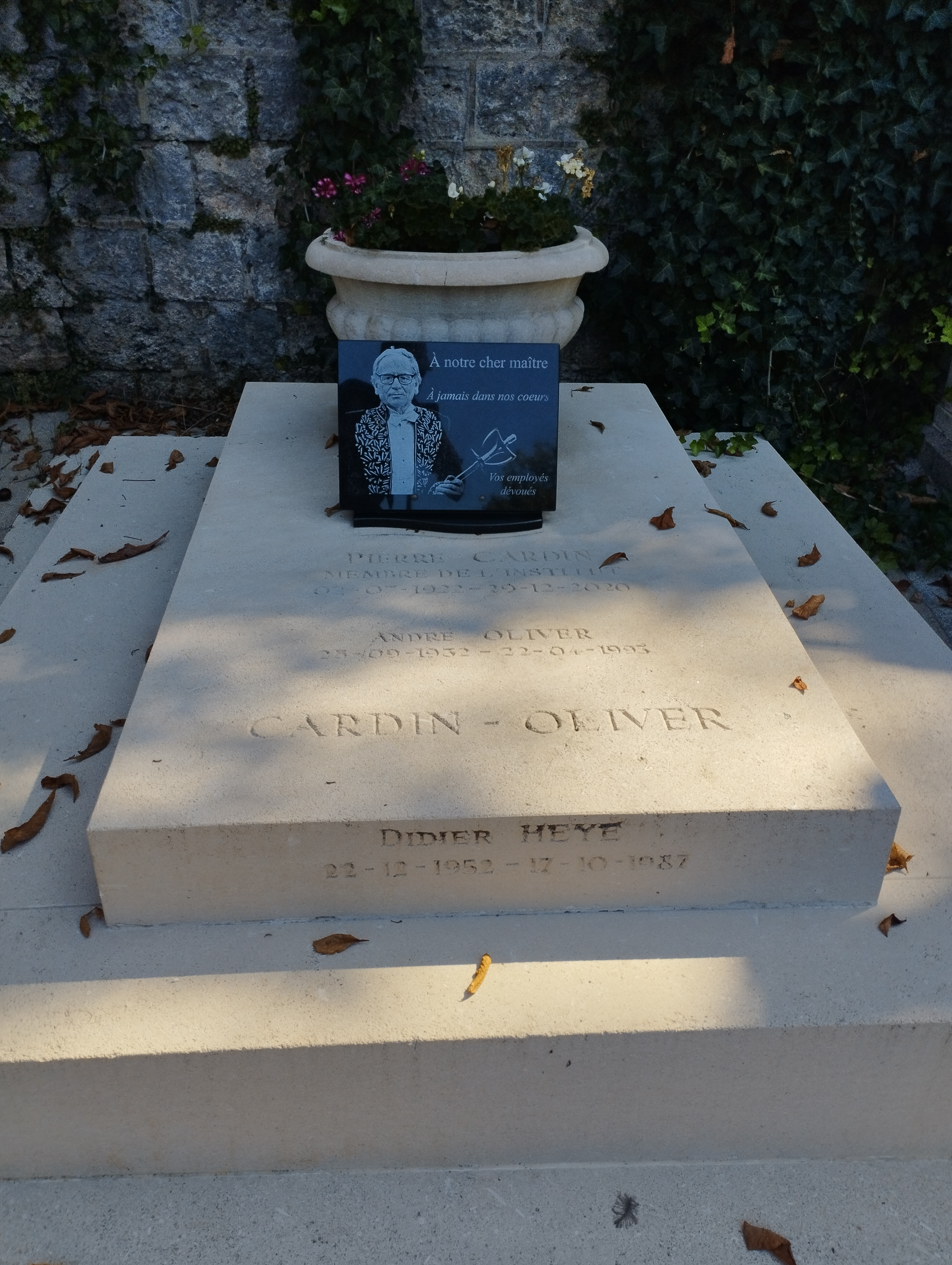
Pierre Cardin's tomb

== Distinctions ==
- France: Knight of the Order of Arts and Letters (February 1983)
- France: Commander of the National Order of Merit (May 1985)
- Italy: Grand Officer of the Order of Merit of the Italian Republic (23 September 1987; Commander: 2 June 1976)
- Japan: Order of the Sacred Treasure, Gold and Silver Star (May 1991)
- France: Commander of the Legion of Honour (January 1997; Officer: April 1991; Knight: April 1983)
- Belarus: Order of Francysk Skaryna (7 January 2004)
- Monaco: Commander of the Order of Cultural Merit (2007)
- Russia: Order of Friendship (24 June 2014)
- Cambodia Kingdom: Royal Order of Sahametrei
- Lebanon: National Order of the Cedar
