= List of Mysteries and Scandals episodes =

The following is a list of episodes of the television series Mysteries and Scandals hosted by A. J. Benza.

== Series overview ==
Season	Episodes	Originally released	
Season	Episodes	First released	Last released
1	52	March 9, 1998	March 1, 1999
2	52	March 8, 1999	February 28, 2000
3	51	March 6, 2000	February 19, 2001

== Episode list ==
=== Season 1: 1998–1999 ===
No. overall	No. in season	Title	Original release date
1	1	"Lana Turner"	March 9, 1998
2	2	"George Reeves"	March 16, 1998
3	3	"Marilyn Monroe"	March 23, 1998
4	4	"James Dean"	March 30, 1998
5	5	"Jayne Mansfield"	April 6, 1998
6	6	"Fatty Arbuckle"	April 13, 1998
7	7	"Thelma Todd"	April 20, 1998
8	8	"Bugsy Siegel"	April 27, 1998
9	9	"Montgomery Clift"	May 4, 1998
10	10	"Jean Harlow"	May 11, 1998
11	11	"Charlie Chaplin"	May 18, 1998
12	12	"Peg Entwistle"	May 25, 1998
13	13	"Bela Lugosi"	June 1, 1998
14	14	"William Desmond Taylor"	June 8, 1998
15	15	"The Black Dahlia"	June 15, 1998
16	16	"Dorothy Dandridge"	June 22, 1998
17	17	"Errol Flynn"	June 29, 1998
18	18	"Howard Hughes"	July 6, 1998
19	19	"The Quiz Show Scandals"	July 13, 1998
20	20	"Judy Garland"	July 20, 1998
21	21	"Billie Holiday"	July 27, 1998
22	22	"Buddy Holly"	August 3, 1998
23	23	"William Randolph Hearst"	August 10, 1998
24	24	"Ramon Novarro"	August 17, 1998
25	25	"Hank Williams"	August 24, 1998
26	26	"Clara Bow"	August 31, 1998
27	27	"Alla Nazimova"	September 7, 1998
28	28	"Busby Berkeley"	September 14, 1998
29	29	"F. Scott Fitzgerald and Zelda Fitzgerald"	September 21, 1998
30	30	"Barbara Hutton"	September 28, 1998
31	31	"Frances Farmer"	October 12, 1998
32	32	"James Whale"	October 19, 1998
33	33	"Harry Houdini"	October 26, 1998
34	34	"Spencer Tracy"	November 2, 1998
35	35	"Joan Crawford"	November 9, 1998
36	36	"Louise Brooks"	November 16, 1998
37	37	"Carole Lombard"	November 23, 1998
38	38	"Rita Hayworth"	November 30, 1998
39	39	"Vivien Leigh"	December 7, 1998
40	40	"John Barrymore"	December 14, 1998
41	41	"Bing Crosby"	December 21, 1998
42	42	"Lenny Bruce"	December 28, 1998
43	43	"Carl Switzer"	January 4, 1999
44	44	"Ernest Hemingway"	January 11, 1999
45	45	"Hillside Stranglers"	January 18, 1999
46	46	"Billy Tipton"	January 25, 1999
47	47	"Sam Cooke"	January 25, 1999
48	48	"Freddie Mercury"	February 1, 1999
49	49	"Sal Mineo"	February 8, 1999
50	50	"Bobby Fuller"	February 15, 1999
51	51	"Doris Duke"	February 22, 1999
52	52	"Jack Warner"	March 1, 1999

=== Season 2: 1999–2000 ===
No. overall	No. in season	Title	Original release date
53	1	"Gig Young"	March 8, 1999
54	2	"Albert Dekker"	March 10, 1999
55	3	"Tallulah Bankhead"	March 15, 1999
56	4	"Orson Welles"	March 22, 1999
57	5	"Bobby Darin"	March 29, 1999
58	6	"The Hollywood Ten"	April 5, 1999
59	7	"Amelia Earhart"	April 12, 1999
60	8	"Ingrid Bergman"	April 19, 1999
61	9	"Aimee Semple McPherson"	April 26, 1999
62	10	"Veronica Lake"	May 3, 1999
63	11	"Rudolph Valentino"	May 10, 1999
64	12	"War of the Worlds"	May 17, 1999
65	13	"The Hollywood Blacklist"	May 31, 1999
66	14	"Mae West"	May 31, 1999
67	15	"Lupe Vélez"	June 7, 1999
68	16	"Frank Lloyd Wright"	June 14, 1999
69	17	"Harry Cohn"	June 21, 1999
70	18	"Josephine Baker"	June 28, 1999
71	19	"Ed Wood"	July 5, 1999
72	20	"Otis Redding"	July 12, 1999
73	21	"Tennessee Williams"	July 19, 1999
74	22	"John Garfield"	July 26, 1999
75	23	"Inger Stevens"	August 2, 1999
76	24	"Jack Cassidy"	August 9, 1999
77	25	"Frankie Lymon"	August 16, 1999
78	26	"Nick Adams"	August 30, 1999
79	27	"Walter Winchell"	August 30, 1999
80	28	"Gypsy Rose Lee"	September 6, 1999
81	29	"Vivian Vance"	September 13, 1999
82	30	"Charles Lindbergh"	September 21, 1999
83	31	"Truman Capote"	September 27, 1999
84	32	"Oscar Levant"	October 4, 1999
85	33	"Jon-Erik Hexum"	October 11, 1999
86	34	"Mabel Normand"	October 18, 1999
87	35	"William Holden"	October 25, 1999
88	36	"Peter Duel"	November 1, 1999
89	37	"Glenn Miller"	November 8, 1999
90	38	"Jerry Giesler"	November 15, 1999
91	39	"Judy Holliday"	November 23, 1999
92	40	"Marlene Dietrich"	November 29, 1999
93	41	"Carole Landis"	December 13, 1999
94	42	"Gene Tierney"	December 13, 1999
95	43	"Russ Columbo"	December 20, 1999
96	44	"Paul Robeson"	December 27, 1999
97	45	"Susan Hayward"	January 10, 2000
98	46	"The Silent Theatre Murder"	January 17, 2000
99	47	"The Knickerbocker Hotel"	January 24, 2000
100	48	"Dorothy Kilgallen"	January 31, 2000
101	49	"Paul Kelly"	February 7, 2000
102	50	"Ethel Merman"	February 14, 2000
103	51	"Harry James & Betty Grable"	February 21, 2000
104	52	"Robert Mitchum"	February 28, 2000

=== Season 3: 2000-2001 ===
No. overall	No. in season	Title	Original release date
105	1	"Libby Holman"	March 6, 2000
106	2	"Capucine"	March 13, 2000
107	3	"Dack Rambo"	March 20, 2000
108	4	"Raymond Chandler"	March 27, 2000
109	5	"Walter Scott"	April 3, 2000
110	6	"Otto Preminger"	April 10, 2000
111	7	"Carol Wayne"	April 17, 2000
112	8	"Stymie"	April 24, 2000
113	9	"Marie McDonald"	May 1, 2000
114	10	"Bruce Lee"	May 8, 2000
115	11	"Ernie Kovacs"	May 15, 2000
116	12	"Jeffrey Hunter"	May 22, 2000
117	13	"Jeff Chandler"	May 29, 2000
118	14	"Barbara Payton"	June 5, 2000
119	15	"Doodles Weaver"	June 12, 2000
120	16	"Mario Lanza"	June 19, 2000
121	17	"Hopper/Parsons"	June 26, 2000
122	18	"Bill "Bojangles" Robinson"	July 3, 2000
123	19	"Albert Salmi"	July 10, 2000
124	20	"Ava Gardner"	July 17, 2000
125	21	"Sam Peckinpah"	July 24, 2000
126	22	"Linda Darnell"	July 31, 2000
127	23	"Susan Cabot"	August 7, 2000
128	24	"Lon Chaney & Creighton Chaney"	August 14, 2000
129	25	"Humphrey Bogart"	August 21, 2000
130	26	"Billy Tipton"	August 28, 2000
131	27	"Beverly Hills Babylon"	September 4, 2000
132	28	"Alan Ladd"	September 11, 2000
133	29	"Hollywood Ghosts"	September 18, 2000
134	30	"Tyrone Power"	October 9, 2000
135	31	"Paul Lynde"	October 23, 2000
136	32	"Desi Arnaz"	October 9, 2000
137	33	"Jean Spangler"	November 1, 2000
138	34	"Groucho Marx"	November 9, 2000
139	35	"Hedy Lamarr"	December 12, 2000
140	36	"Bette Davis"	December 18, 2000
141	37	"Peter Lawford"	December 25, 2000
142	38	"Gloria Grahame"	January 1, 2001
143	39	"Maria Callas"	November 27, 2000
144	40	"Audie Murphy"	December 4, 2000
145	41	"Steve Cochran"	December 11, 2000
146	42	"Maria Montez"	December 18, 2000
147	43	"Vincent Price"	December 25, 2000
148	44	"Gail Russell"	January 1, 2001
149	45	"Dorothy Arzner"	January 8, 2001
150	46	"Cary Grant"	January 15, 2001
151	47	"John Wayne"	January 22, 2001
152	48	"Merle Oberon"	January 29, 2001
153	49	"Hollywood Goodfellas"	February 5, 2001
154	50	"Charlie "Bird" Parker"	February 12, 2001
155	51	"Will Rogers"	February 19, 2001
