= Dynel =

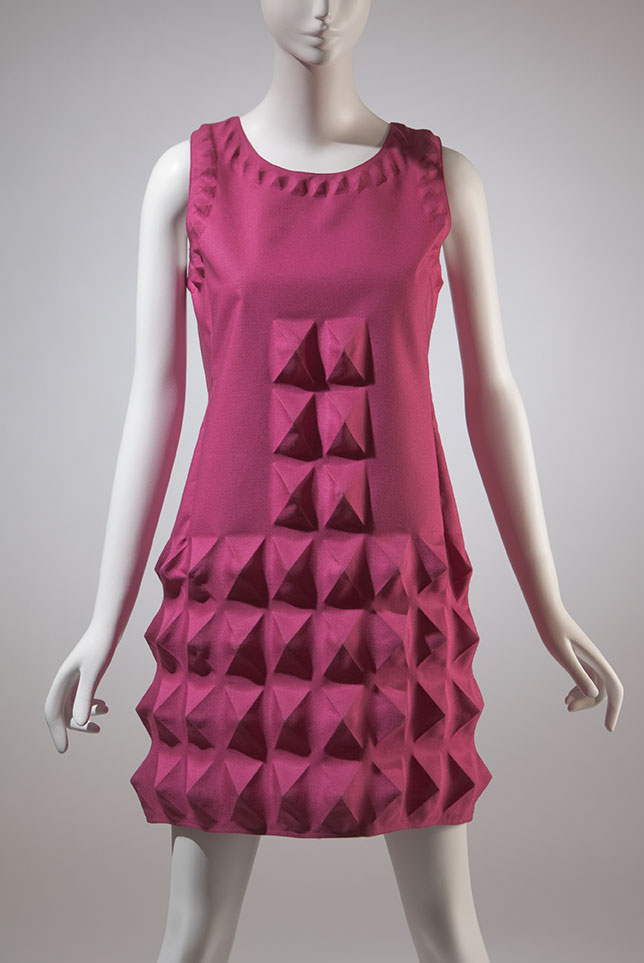
1968 Pierre Cardin dress made from pink heat-moulded Dynel

Dynel is a trade name for a type of synthetic fiber used in fibre reinforced plastic composite materials, especially for marine applications. As it is easily dyed, it was also used to fabricate wigs. The fashion designer Pierre Cardin used Dynel fabric (which he marketed as "Cardine") to make a collection of heat-molded dresses in 1968. A copolymer of acrylonitrile and vinyl chloride, Dynel shares many properties with both polyacrylonitrile (high abrasion resistance, good tensile strength) and PVC (flame resistance). It is an acrylic resin.

Dynel was originally produced by Union Carbide corporation.
