= Junior High School (film) =

- Blu-ray cover
- Directed by: Michael Nankin; David Wechter
- Written by: Steve Jacobson; Briana London; Michael Nankin; David Wechter
- Starring: P. David Ebersole; Paula Abdul; Kirk Burnett; Karen Capelle; Mikal Robert Taylor; Toni Mazarin
- Cinematography: Steve Jacobson
- Edited by: Steve Jacobson; Briana London
- Music by: David Wechter; Julius Wechter
- Distributed by: Tapeworm Video Distributors (VHS); Kritzerland (Blu-Ray)
- Release date: 1978
- Running time: 37 minutes
- Country: United States
- Language: English

Junior High School is a 1978 musical featurette starring P. David Ebersole as Jerry Sanders. The film chronicles the first day of term at a dramatized school of seventh and eighth graders, and consists of seven songs along with several dance numbers. The only member of the cast to become well known later is Paula Abdul, though she played a relatively minor role in the film.

== Plot ==
The story begins with Sherry (Paula Abdul) declaring plans to hold a party that night. Upon hearing about this party, Jerry's friend, Paul (Kirk Burnett) encourages him to ask his crush, Lori Scott (Karen Capelle) to accompany him to the event. On his way to doing this, Jerry encounters several obstacles, including repeated run-ins with Keith (Mikal Robert Taylor), a school bully, and Vicki (Toni Mazarin), an ill-intentioned girl who hopes Jerry will ask her to the party so she can spite a previous boyfriend.
