= A. J. After Hours =

Television talk show hosted by A. J. Benza,

A. J. After Hours is a television program aired on the E! cable network in 2001. The talk show, hosted by gossip columnist A. J. Benza, was described as a show that "mixes interviews with comedy sketches and man-on-the-street segments, and which explores the New York's hip club scene."

The program received mixed reviews, with Entertainment Weekly calling the show "retro sexist ... contempo goofy ... hairier than The Man Show," and Andrew Wallenstein, writing for Media Life, said the show "is about as compelling a talk show as The Magic Hour," referring to Magic Johnson's failed attempt at a talk show.

The show was cancelled after only a few episodes.
