= Mansfield 66/67 =

2017 film directed by P. David Ebersole

- Festival poster by Shag
- Directed by: P. David Ebersole; Todd Hughes
- Produced by: P. David Ebersole; Todd Hughes; Larra Anderson; Alison Martino
- Cinematography: John Tanzer (U.S.); Larra Anderson (UK)
- Edited by: P. David Ebersole; Todd Hughes; Joel Maudsley; Luke Smith
- Music by: James Peter Moffatt; Robert Davis
- Production company: The Ebersole Hughes Company
- Distributed by: Gunpowder & Sky; Peccadillo Pictures
- Release dates: January 29, 2017 (IFFR); October 27, 2017 (United States); April 12, 2018 (United Kingdom)
- Running time: 85 minutes
- Countries: United States; United Kingdom
- Language: English

Mansfield 66/67 is a 2017 documentary musical directed by P. David Ebersole and Todd Hughes about the last two years of actress Jayne Mansfield's life. The film examines the rumors surrounding Mansfield's untimely death, and relationship with Anton LaVey as a celebration of Mansfield's life on the 50th anniversary of her death.

== Background ==
Mansfield 66/67 was conceived when writers P. David Ebersole and Todd Hughes were unable to get their narrative The Devil Made Her Do It produced, and instead decided to present their Mansfield/LaVey story as a documentary. More than 100 students and staff from Leeds Beckett University worked with the filmmakers to bring the film to life, inviting Ben Wilkins to re-mix the film in Leeds as a master class.

The film was released theatrically in North America for Halloween 2017, and in the UK in April 2018.

== Synopsis ==
Mansfield 66/67 is largely made up of modern-day interviews with celebrities, historians, and psychologists, interspersed with scenes from Mansfield's library of work, performance art by students working on the film, and animations. It summarizes the career of actress Jayne Mansfield, spending the bulk of the film detailing her relationship with Anton LaVey, the Church of Satan, and the two years leading up to her death in 1967.

The film's soundtrack was released in 2017 by The Ebersole Hughes Company Records and Tapes featuring: Robert Davis, James Peter Moffatt, Donna Loren, The 5.6.7.8's, The Wayfarers, Ann Magnuson, White Rabbit Club, Mikey Silverman, Larra Anderson, and Maurice Gainen.

== Cast ==
- Kenneth Anger
- Richmond Arquette
- A. J. Benza
- Susan Bernard
- Peaches Christ
- Cheryl Dunye
- Tippi Hedren
- Anton LaVey (archival footage)
- Jayne Mansfield (archival footage)
- Ann Magnuson
- Marilyn (singer)
- Alison Martino
- Matt Momchilov
- Dolly Read
- Yolonda Ross
- Mamie Van Doren
- John Waters
- Mary Woronov
- Dr. Barbara Hahn
- Dr. Eileen Jones
- Dr. Eve Oishi
- Dr. Jane Alexander Stewart
- Sandy Balzar
- Miguel Pendas
- Dawn Patricia Robinson
- Edenamiuki Aiguobasinmwin
- Samuel S. Brody (archival footage)
- Cary Grant (archival footage)
