= Sylvana Lorenz =

French art dealer (1953–2026)

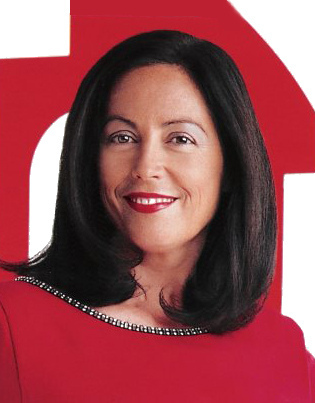
- Born: 14 February 1953; Tunis, French Tunisia
- Died: 23 April 2026 (aged 73)
- Movement: Communication aesthetics
- Patron: Pierre Cardin

Sylvana Lorenz (14 February 1953 – 23 April 2026) was a French art dealer and writer.

== Life and career ==
Lorenz opened her first art gallery in 1981 where she began to make a name for herself by supporting young artists. In 1983, Pierre Cardin came into Lorenz's art gallery to purchase an artwork. After this meeting, Lorenz began a long association with Cardin until his death in 2020.

She would go on to manage communications between 1998 and 2015 for the Espace Cardin, a cinema, art gallery and multipurpose hall in the Champs-Élysées district, 8th arrondissement, Paris.

In 2021, she published Madame Cardin, a book about her association with Cardin.

Lorenz died on 23 April 2026, at the age of 73.

== Bibliography ==
- 1991: L'ingénue galeriste, Éditions Antoine Candau.
- 1993: La galeriste avertie, Z'éditions, Nice.
- 2001: La galeriste extravertie, Z'éditions, Nice.
- 2003: À nous deux, Paris !, Éditions Flammarion, Paris.
- 2006: Biographie de Pierre Cardin, Éditions Calmann-Lévy, Paris.
- 2021: Madame Cardin, éditions de L'Archipel, Paris.
- 2024: L’art est une partie de plaisir. Mémoires d’une galeriste. éditions de L'Archipel. Nice ISBN 978-2809847802
