= Hit So Hard =

- Festival poster
- Directed by: P. David Ebersole
- Produced by: Todd Hughes; Christina Soletti
- Cinematography: John Tanzer; Larra Anderson; Mark Putnam
- Edited by: P. David Ebersole
- Music by: Roddy Bottum
- Production companies: The Ebersole Hughes Company; Tight Ship Productions
- Distributed by: Well Go USA; Variance Films
- Release dates: March 15, 2011 (SXSW); April 13, 2012 (United States)
- Running time: 103 minutes
- Country: United States
- Language: English

Hit So Hard is a 2011 American documentary film directed by P. David Ebersole. The film details the life and near death story of Patty Schemel, drummer of the seminal '90s alternative rock band Hole, and charts her early life, music career, and spiral into crack cocaine addiction. The film weaves together Hi8 video footage Schemel recorded while on Hole's 1994-95 world tour with contemporary interviews with her, bandmates Courtney Love, Eric Erlandson, and Melissa Auf der Maur, as well as her family members. The film also features interviews with other female drummers and musicians, including Nina Gordon, Kate Schellenbach, Gina Schock, Debbi Peterson, and Phranc.

The film's score is written by Roddy Bottum of Faith No More. It was produced by Todd Hughes and Christina Soletti and was released theatrically in North America in 2012 by Well Go USA via Variance Films. It also screened a series of film festivals, including South by Southwest, the Marché du Film at Cannes, the Seattle Gay and Lesbian Film Festival, The Portland Queer Documentary Film Festival, and Outfest. The title is a reference to a song on Hole's 1998 album Celebrity Skin.

== Background ==
Hit So Hard was conceived after Schemel discovered a cache of Hi8 video footage which she had recorded herself during her world tour with Hole promoting their second album, Live Through This (1994). In the process of digitizing the footage to preserve it from deterioration, Schemel and Ebersole sought to utilize the footage in order to tell Schemel's story.

== Plot ==
The film begins with discussion amidst Hole's 1994 and 1995 world tour, then works backwards to Schemel's childhood growing up in Marysville, Washington, and details her coming out to her family as a lesbian, as well as her immersion in Seattle's music scenes, where she would eventually cross paths with Kurt Cobain. Through contemporary interviews with Schemel's bandmates Courtney Love, Eric Erlandson, and Melissa Auf der Maur, her beginnings in Hole are detailed, including her audition with Love and Erlandson in Los Angeles amidst the Rodney King riots, as well as her time living with Love and husband Kurt Cobain, and the songwriting process between Love, Schemel, and Erlandson. Additional commentary from fellow female drummers, musicians, peers, and friends of Schemel's are provided throughout. After the death of Hole's bassist Kristen Pfaff in 1994 (only two months after the death of Kurt Cobain), the band embarked on a world tour with Auf der Maur as Pfaff's replacement, and Schemel, along with Love, began heavily using heroin. Schemel's drug use leads to a breakup with her girlfriend, who acted as Love's personal assistant on the tour, and Schemel reflects on her time in a rehabilitation facility she checked into with Love after the conclusion of the tour in 1995.

In 1998, the band enters the studio to record their third album, Celebrity Skin, where Schemel is eventually replaced by a session drummer at the suggestion of the record's producer, Michael Beinhorn, who had been given authorization by the rest of the band after providing them with studio loops of Schemel's weaker drum tracks. This leads to a rift between Schemel and the band, and her eventual resignation. After leaving Hole, Schemel becomes addicted to crack-cocaine and ends up living on the streets in Los Angeles for two years, only occasionally maintaining contact with Love. The film then charts Schemel's recovery from her addiction, mending with the band, her marriage to wife Christina Soletti, and her newfound passion for animals, opening her own animal boarding and dog walking business. The film concludes with Schemel teaching drum lessons in her spare time.

== Cast ==
- Patty Schemel
- Courtney Love (of Hole)
- Eric Erlandson (of Hole)
- Melissa Auf der Maur (of Hole)
- Nina Gordon (of Veruca Salt)
- Kate Schellenbach (of Luscious Jackson)
- Gina Schock (of The Go-Go's)
- Alice de Buhr (of Fanny)
- Debbi Peterson (of The Bangles)
- Izzy (of Care Bears on Fire)
- Phranc
- Roddy Bottum (of Faith No More)
- Dallas Taylor
- Sarah Vowell
- Chris Whitemyer
- Larry Schemel (of Midnight Movies)
- Terry Schemel
- Joe Mama-Nitzberg
- Kristen Pfaff (archival footage)
- Kurt Cobain (archival footage)
- Evan Dando (archival footage)
- Dexter Holland (archival footage)
- Leslie Mah (archival footage)
- Sheri Ozeki (archival footage)
- Fred Schneider (archival footage)
- Jenny Shimizu (archival footage)
- Pat Smear (archival footage)
- Metallica (archival footage)

== Release ==
Hit So Hard opened at New York City's Cinema Village on April 13, 2012 before playing in theaters in a limited release around the United States and Canada, via WellGo USA and Variance Films. The film was released theatrically in Japan via King Records and in the UK via Peccadillo Pictures; it opened in Tokyo at Theater N on April 28, 2012 and in London at ICA London on November 16, 2012.

== Reception ==
On review aggregator website Rotten Tomatoes, the film holds an approval rating of 66% based on 38 reviews, with an average rating of 6.1/10. On Metacritic, Hit So Hard holds a rank of 52 out of a 100, based on 13 critics, indicating "mixed or average" reviews.

Manohla Dargis of The New York Times called the film a "touching story", while Peter Bradshaw of The Guardian said that "[when it comes to] read[ing] between the lines of the empowering story of Hole's drug-addicted drummer Patty Schemel, [the feeling of] uncompromising picture of Courtney Love is also there".

According to Michael Rechtshaffen of The Hollywood Reporter, the "emotions run raw in this behind-the-scenes look at drummer Patty Schemel and her drug-fueled run with the 90s grunge rock band, Hole".

Variety's Ronnie Scheib cautioned that Hit So Hard is "stylistically incoherent at times", adding that "[the] picture benefits from the percussionist's plainspokenness".

== Accolades ==
- 2011: Opening Night Film at Beat Film Festival in Moscow
- 2011: Won Jury Award for Best Documentary (Honorable Mention) at Frameline Film Festival
- 2011: Documentary Centerpiece Gala at Outfest
- 2011: Closing Night Film at Birmingham Shout at the Sidewalk Moving Picture Festival
- 2011: Won Audience Award - Sight & Soundtrack at Philadelphia Film Festival
- 2012: Nominated for Outstanding Documentary for the 24th GLAAD Media Awards
