= Dear Mom, Love Cher =

- Directed by: P. David Ebersole
- Starring: Cher; Georgia Holt; Georganne LaPiere; Chaz Bono; Elijah Blue Allman
- Theme music composer: Cary Berger
- Country of origin: United States
- Original language: English

Production
- Executive producers: Cher; Todd Hughes; P. David Ebersole; Risa Shapiro; Tanya Lopez
- Producer: Todd Hughes
- Production location: Malibu, California
- Camera setup: John Tanzer
- Running time: 60 minutes

Original release
- Network: Lifetime
- Release: May 6, 2013

Dear Mom, Love Cher is a 2013 American television documentary about Georgia Holt, mother of singer and actress Cher. The film, directed by P. David Ebersole, recounts Cher's family history and features in-depth interviews with her, Holt, Holt's other daughter Georganne LaPiere, and Holt's grandchildren, from Cher, Chaz Bono and Elijah Blue Allman.

The film premiered on Lifetime on May 6, 2013, with a worldwide VOD/DVD release on September 24, 2013, simultaneous with Cher's 25th studio album, Closer to the Truth.

== Cast ==
- Georgia Holt
- Cher
- Georganne LaPiere
- Chaz Bono
- Elijah Blue Allman

== Accolades ==
- Won – Women's Image Network Award for Outstanding Show Produced by a Woman – Cher
- Nominated – Women's Image Network Awards for Outstanding Documentary Film – The Ebersole Hughes Company and Lifetime
