= Laurel Lamp Company =

American manufacturer of lamps

Laurel Lamp Manufacturing Company Inc.
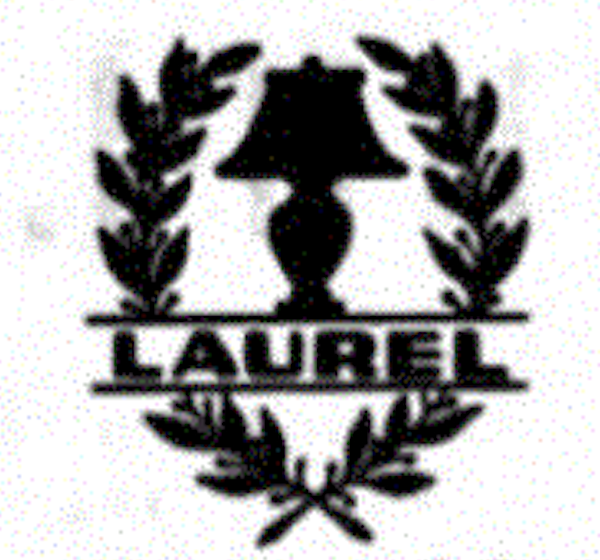
- Type: Manufacturing
- Industry: Lighting and home furnishings
- Founded: 1946
- Founder: Max Weiss, Harold Weiss, & Murray Weiss
- Defunct: 1981
- Headquarters: Rome & Magazine Streets, Newark, New Jersey 07105, U.S.
- Website: laurellampfoundation.com

The Laurel Lamp Manufacturing Company Inc. (often referred to as the Laurel Lamp Company or Laurel) was an American manufacturer of lamps and home furnishings based in Newark, New Jersey from 1946 to 1981. The Laurel Lamp Company was founded by Max Weiss and his two sons, Murray and Harold Weiss.

Laurel was known for its original mid-century modern lamp designs and other home furnishings in traditional, contemporary, and post-modern styles. The company’s design work was overseen by co-founder and president Harold Weiss and was supplemented by collaborations with notable designers including Pierre Cardin, Bijan of California and the House of Salviati in Murano, Italy.

== History ==
=== 1913–1945 ===
The history of the Laurel Lamp Company begins with Max Weiss, an Austrian tinsmith who immigrated to the United States in the early 20th century. In 1913, Weiss and his uncle, Aaron Habacht, formed a lamp company called, Habacht and Weiss, selling oil lamps, gas ceiling fixtures and coach lanterns. When electricity became more widely available in homes, Habacht and Weiss began shifting production to portable electric lamps and changed the name of the company to the Sunset Lighting Fixture Company.

In 1924, the Sunset Lighting Fixture Company merged with The Mutual Lamp Manufacturing Company to create the Mutual-Sunset Lamp Manufacturing Company. In 1943, Max Weiss had a heart-attack and retired from Mutual Sunset.

=== 1946–1983 ===
In 1946, Max Weiss came out of retirement and along with his two sons, Murray and Harold Weiss formed the Laurel Lamp Manufacturing Company.

In April 1969, Instrument Systems Corporation, now known as Griffon, acquired Laurel for US $3.6 million. Harold Weiss remained as President of Laurel under the new ownership. By 1971, Laurel had expanded to open showrooms in New York, High Point Market North Carolina, Chicago, Dallas, Los Angeles, and San Francisco.

In January 1979, Instrument Systems terminated Mr. Weiss’ contract and Henry Jampol was named president of Laurel. In 1981, Howard Wolff was president of the Laurel Lamp Company.

Laurel’s corporate status was revoked in 1981. In 1983, Westwood Lighting Group purchased the remainder of Laurel’s assets before folding the brand into Westwood’s existing product line.

== Laurel designs and designers ==
Many of Laurel’s designs were original concepts created in-house by co-founder and president Harold Weiss, American sculptor Richard “Dick” Barr and other staff designers.

Notably, in 1971, Laurel collaborated with the House of Salviati, a Murano glass manufacturer founded by Antonio Salviati, to create Venetian glass sculptural lamps. In 1977, the company partnered with French designer Pierre Cardin to produce a lighting collection as part of Cardin's entry into the American furnishing industry.
