= Mysteries and Scandals =

American television program

- Also known as: Mysteries & Scandals
- Genre: Infotainment
- Created by: Michael Danahy
- Directed by: Joel K. Rodgers; Liz Flynn
- Presented by: A. J. Benza
- Narrated by: A. J. Benza
- Country of origin: United States
- Original language: English
- No. of seasons: 3
- No. of episodes: 152 (list of episodes)

Production
- Executive producers: Betsy Rott; Gary Socol; Michael Danahy
- Producers: Chip Bell; Victoria Chapman; Liz Flynn; Alison Martino; Daniel Schwartz; Lynne Morgan; Colin Whelan; Dan Abrams
- Running time: 22–24 minutes

Original release
- Network: E!
- Release: April 9, 1998 – February 19, 2001

Mysteries and Scandals (also known as Mysteries & Scandals) is an American television program hosted by A. J. Benza. The series was originally broadcast on the E! network from March 1998 until February 2001.

== Synopsis ==
The series detailed the lives of various celebrities, both well-known and somewhat obscure. Most celebrities that were featured endured hardships or died untimely deaths. The series interviewed various celebrities who knew the subject along with still photographs accompanied by narrations, and dramatic reenactments.

The show was highly stylized and presented each episode in a noir fashion with backdrops set in various Hollywood locations and narrated in a hard-boiled, often sarcastic fashion by Benza. One of Benza's memorable catchphrases, "Fame, ain't it a bitch?", would later become the title of his autobiography.

The series aired for three seasons. Episodes were repeated on E! for a period of time after the series' initial run.

== See also ==
- List of Mysteries and Scandals episodes

Season	Episodes	Originally released	
Season	Episodes	First released	Last released
1	52	March 9, 1998	March 1, 1999
2	52	March 8, 1999	February 28, 2000
3	51	March 6, 2000	February 19, 2001
