= Kaka Ferskur =

1988 film written and directed by Todd Hughes

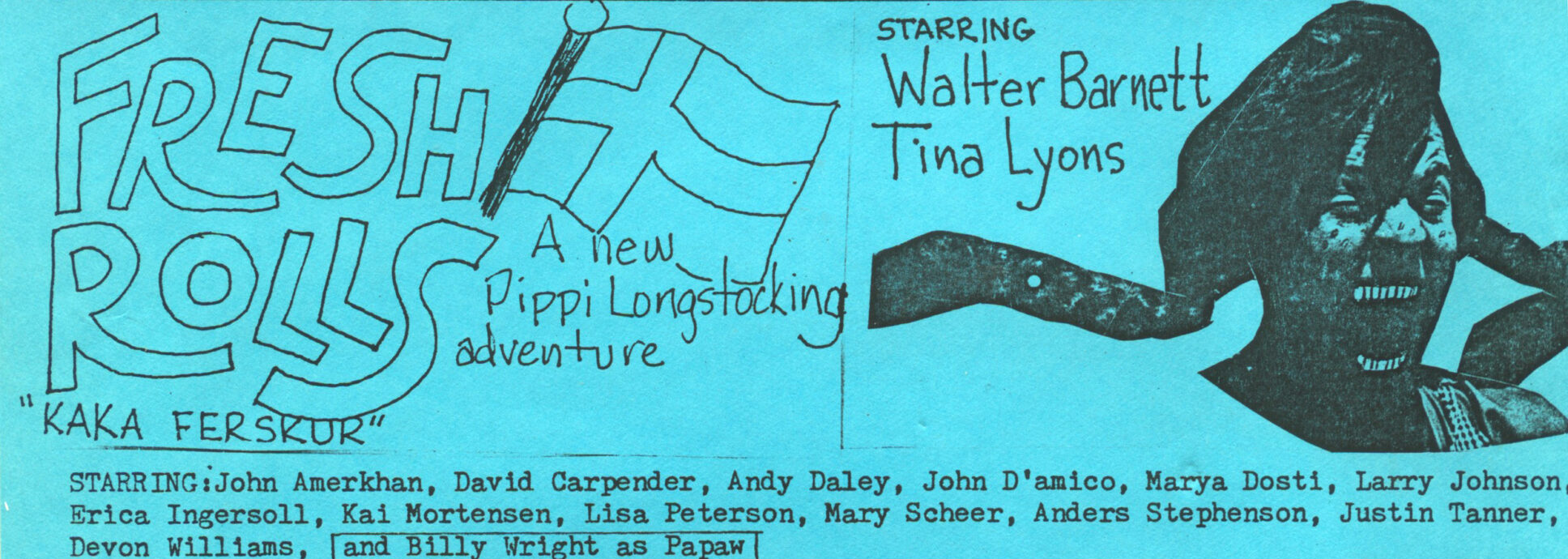
- Newspaper advertisement
- Directed by: Todd Hughes
- Written by: Todd Hughes
- Produced by: Todd Hughes
- Cinematography: David Carpender
- Music by: ABBA
- Production company: Feminette Productions
- Distributed by: Feminette Productions
- Release date: July 10, 1988
- Running time: 30 minutes
- Country: United States
- Language: English

Kaka Ferskur (Fresh Rolls) or The New Adventures of Pippi Longstocking is a 1988 film written and directed by Todd Hughes. Kaka Ferskur satirizes coming of age from a "Pippi Longstocking's" view. The film shows the characters either as young adults or as real adults who won't grow up. In this film, men often play female roles, with squeaky voices dubbed over the men's voices. Pippi Longstocking is played by comic Walter Barnett.

== Plot ==
In Kaka Ferskur, Pippi meets Age, a Swedish ghost at the beach. He challenges her by saying if she can prove to him that she isn't growing up, she may remain a child, living with her pets in her grand mansion, "Villa Villekulla", but if she loses the bet, she must admit to Age in the end that she is coming of age and must leave childish things behind.

She later catches up with her friends Annika and Tommy, and they go to Hollywood. There, Tommy loses the girls, and they embark on a journey to find him. On the journey, they see a man nude, enjoy hot, fresh rolls (hence Kaka Ferskur), and do other things like get drunk and throw rolls at adults.

== Cast ==
- Walter Barnett as Pippi
- Tina Lyons as Annika
- Kai Mortensen as Tommy
- Anders Stephenson as Age (Swedish Ghost)
- Billy Wright as Papaw
- Marya Dosti as Apalachia Annie
- John D'Amico as Nasty McFlasher
- Justin Tanner as Swedish Buttermaid
- David Carpender as Dale
- Jon Amirkhan as Circus Liquor Clerk
- Andy Daley as Rufus
- Devon Williams as Sad Swedish Girl
- Larry Johnson as Pookie Dewar
