= P. David Ebersole =

American film director

- Born: Peter David Ebersole, Jr. 16 March 1964 (age 61); Los Angeles, California, U.S.
- Occupations: Writer; director; producer
- Years active: 1978–present
- Spouse: Todd Hughes

P. David Ebersole (born 16 March 1964) is an American independent filmmaker, television director, and novelist. He began his film career as a child actor, playing the lead in the musical Junior High School (1978), which also starred Paula Abdul.

== Career ==
Stepping behind the camera, as an undergraduate he won Best Film and Best Director at NYU for his first effort, "Lover Man" (1986), and earned his MFA winning AFI's Franklin J. Schaffner award for best film/best director for his student thesis project, "Death in Venice, CA" (1994). He directed the boxing film "Straight Right" (2000) that premiered on Sundance Channel, and was a director on two telenovelas for Fox Television airing on My Network TV, Desire (2006) and Wicked Wicked Games (2007) starring Tatum O'Neal.

He was co-producer of the HBO original film,Stranger Inside (2001) and the independent film The New Women (2001) starring Mary Woronov. He directed and edited his first documentary Hit So Hard about drummer Patty Schemel of the seminal grunge band Hole (band), which had its world premiere at SXSW 2011 and was released theatrically in 2012. Along with his husband and business partner Todd Hughes, he was Executive Producer of Room 237, a subjective documentary that explores the numerous theories about the hidden meanings within Stanley Kubrick's film "The Shining."

Ebersole is writer/director and Executive Producer of Dear Mom, Love Cher, a documentary about Georgia Holt, the mother of international superstar Cher. [1] Independently produced by The Ebersole Hughes Company and APIS Productions, it premiered on Lifetime May 6, 2013.

His film Mansfield 66/67, premiered at the 2017 International Film Festival Rotterdam (IFFR) where Paris-based International sales outfit Stray Dogs picked up worldwide rights. The film is about the last two years of movie goddess Jayne Mansfield’s life, and the rumors swirling around her untimely death being caused by a curse after her alleged romantic dalliance with Anton LaVey, head of the Church of Satan. Mansfield 66/67 is "a true story based on rumor and hearsay," celebrating Jayne's life on the 50th anniversary of her death. Directed by Ebersole with his husband Todd Hughes, and produced by Ebersole, Hughes and Larra Anderson, it was released theatrically in North America for Halloween 2017 by Gunpowder & Sky.

The award-winning feature documentary House of Cardin, about the iconic designer Pierre Cardin, directed by Ebersole and Hughes, premiered to a standing ovation at the 2019 Venice Film Festival in the prestigious Giornate degli Autori section, and it is in distribution worldwide, with Utopia taking North American rights. In 2021, My Name Is Lopez, a concert/documentary feature film about the life and legend of Trini Lopez, one of the first Latino rock and rollers in the U.S., won Best Documentary Feature Film when it premiered at AmDocs in Palm Springs CA and it was picked up for distribution by Cinedigm.

In May 2022, Pelekinesis Press published Ebersole's first novel, 99 Miles From L.A, "a timely, intricately woven bisexual love triangle between a trio of desert-based criminals."

== Personal life ==
He currently keeps residences in both Mérida, Mexico and Palm Springs, California, with his husband Todd Hughes.

== Filmography ==
=== Director ===
- My Name Is Lopez (2021)
  - Documentary Feature
- House of Cardin (2019)
  - Documentary Feature
- Mansfield 66/67 (2017)
  - Documentary Feature
- Dear Mom, Love Cher (2013)
  - TV Movie Documentary
- Hit So Hard (2011)
  - Documentary Feature
- "Swimming" (2010)
  - Short
- Wicked Wicked Games (2007)
  - TV Series/Telenovela, 65 episodes
- Desire (2006)
  - TV Series/Telenovela, 65 episodes
- Hot Chicks (2006)
  - Feature Compilation of shorts, segment "Doom Town"
- Straight Right (2000)
  - Narrative Feature
- "Death In Venice, CA" (1994)
  - Short

=== Producer ===
- My Name Is Lopez (2021)
  - Documentary Feature
- House of Cardin (2019)
  - Documentary Feature
- Mansfield 66/67 (2017)
  - Documentary Feature
- Alaska Is A Drag (2016)
  - Narrative Feature, Executive Producer
- A Reunion (2014)
  - Narrative Feature, Executive Producer
- Dear Mom, Love Cher (2013)
  - TV Movie Documentary, Executive Producer
- Room 237 (2012)
  - Documentary Feature, Executive Producer
- The New Women (2001)
  - Narrative Feature, Co-producer
- Stranger Inside (2001)
  - TV Movie, co-producer
