= Andre Oliver =

French fashion designer (1932 – 1993)

André Oliver
- Born: 1932; Toulouse, France
- Died: 22 April 1993 (aged 60–61)
- Occupation: Fashion designer
- Known for: Long-term collaboration with Pierre Cardin
- Partner: Pierre Cardin

André Oliver (1932 – 22 April 1993) was a French fashion designer, and the long-term business partner and life partner of Pierre Cardin.

== Life ==
Oliver was born in Toulouse in 1932.

Oliver joined Pierre Cardin in 1951, one year after he founded his fashion house, and became "Cardin's right-hand man, friend and fellow creator".
