= Todd Hughes =

American film director

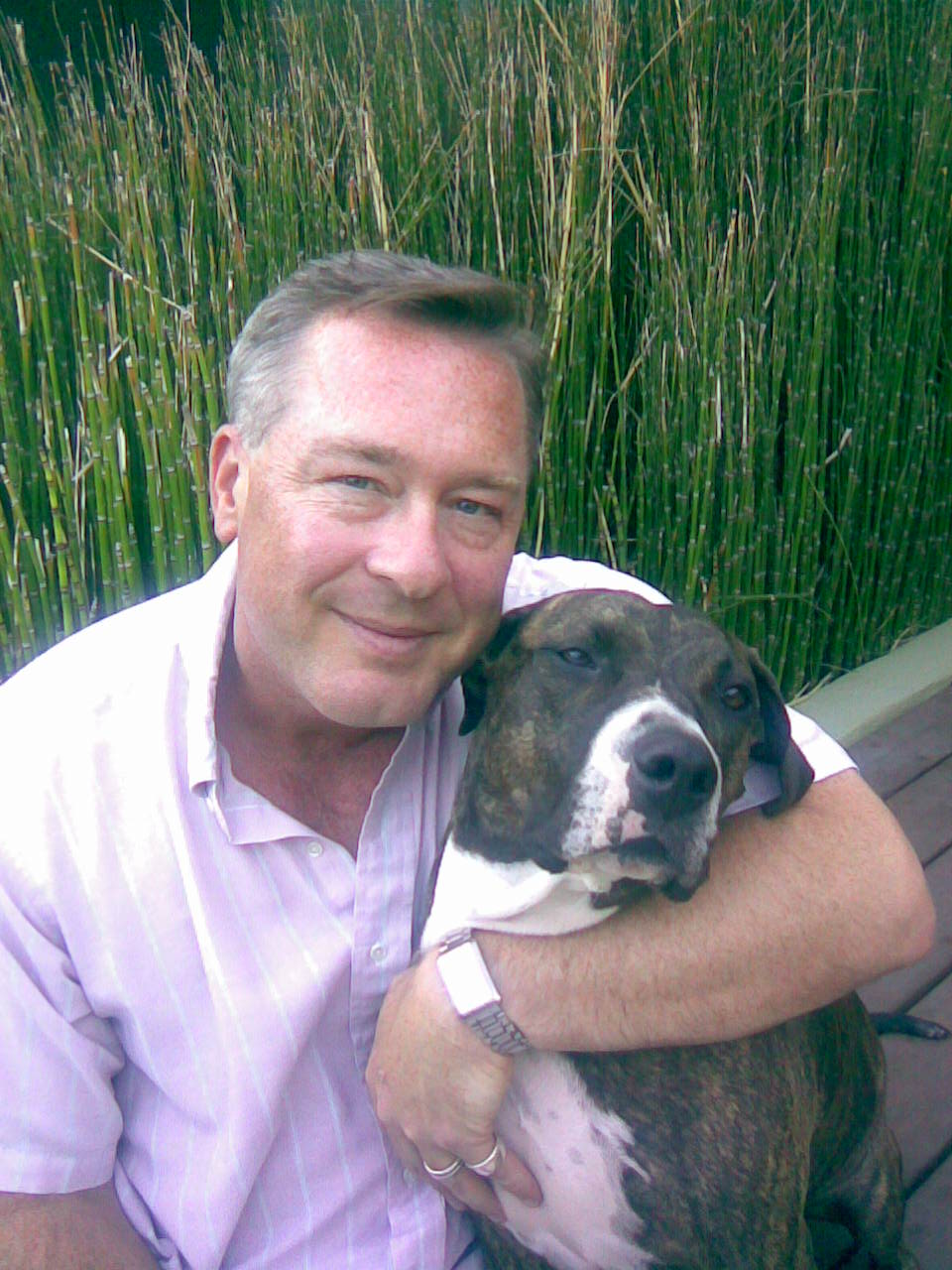
- Todd Hughes, with company mascot Butchie
- Born: Todd Langdon Hughes; August 13, 1963 (age 62); Salt Lake City, Utah, US
- Occupations: Screenwriter, author, film director, producer
- Years active: 1985–present
- Spouse: P. David Ebersole

Todd Hughes (born August 13, 1963 in Salt Lake City, Utah) is an American screenwriter, author, producer and film director. He is a Columbia University graduate and currently resides in Palm Springs, California and Mérida, Yucatán.

== Career ==
His short film directing credits include Kaka Ferskur (1988) and Ding Dong (1995). He directed the independent film The New Women (2001) starring Mary Woronov and wrote for the 2007 Fox television series Wicked Wicked Games starring Tatum O'Neal. He produced his first documentary Hit So Hard with Christina Soletti about drummer Patty Schemel of the seminal grunge band Hole, which premiered at South by Southwest 2011 and was released theatrically in 2012.

In 2001, he was named one of Filmmaker Magazine's New Faces of Indie Film and he has a long-standing creative partnership with filmmaker P. David Ebersole, his husband.

Together, Ebersole and Hughes executive produced Room 237. a subjective documentary that explores the numerous theories about the hidden meanings within Stanley Kubrick's film The Shining.

In 2013, Todd produced the Lifetime documentary Dear Mom, Love Cher, a insightful look at singer/actress Cher's mother Georgia Holt and their family history, as well as Executive Producer along with Ebersole (also writer and director), Cher, Risa Shapiro and Tanya Lopez.

His documentary directorial debut, Mansfield 66/67, premiered at the 2017 International Film Festival Rotterdam where Paris-based International sales outfit Stray Dogs picked up worldwide rights. The film, directed by Hughes with Ebersole, and produced by Ebersole, Hughes and Larra Anderson, follows the last two years of movie goddess Jayne Mansfield’s life and the rumours swirling around her untimely death being caused by a curse after her alleged romantic dalliance with Anton LaVey, head of the Church of Satan. Mansfield 66/67 is "a true story based on rumour and hearsay," celebrating Jayne's life on the 50th anniversary of her death.

The award-winning feature documentary House of Cardin, about the iconic designer Pierre Cardin, directed by Ebersole and Hughes, premiered to a standing ovation at the 2019 Venice Film Festival in the prestigious Giornate degli Autori section, and it is in distribution worldwide, with Utopia taking North American rights. In 2021, My Name Is Lopez, a concert/documentary feature film about the life and legend of Trini Lopez, one of the first Latino rock and rollers in the U.S., won Best Documentary Feature Film when it premiered at AmDocs in Palm Springs CA and it was picked up for distribution by Cinedigm.

In September 2022, Pelekinesis Press published Hughes' first book, called "Lunch With Lizabeth" in which his "heartfelt bond with noir actress Lizabeth Scott colors this compelling memoir."
