= A. J. Benza =

American gossip columnist

AJ Benza
- Born: Alfred Joseph Benza; June 2, 1962 (age 64); Bensonhurst, Brooklyn, New York City, U.S.
- Education: C.W. Post Campus of Long Island University (BA)
- Occupations: Gossip columnist, television host
- Spouse: Virginia Folk (m. 2003)
- Children: 2

Alfred Joseph Benza (born June 2, 1962) is an American gossip columnist and television host.

== Early life ==
Benza was born in Bensonhurst, Brooklyn, New York City, though he moved with his family to West Islip, New York on Long Island shortly after his birth. He has two sisters, Rosalie and Lorraine. After graduating from West Islip High School in 1980, Benza majored in journalism at C.W. Post Campus of Long Island University on Long Island.

== Career ==
During college Benza began writing for Newsday and was soon hired full-time as a gossip columnist for that paper and eventually for the New York Daily News. It was as a gossip columnist that he began appearing on E! Entertainment Television's The Gossip Show in the mid-1990s. This led to appearances on talk shows such as Geraldo, Hard Copy, The Montel Williams Show, The Maury Povich Show, and various other television talk shows. He was later fired from the New York Daily News by editor Pete Hamill.

=== Relationship with E! ===
Soon after leaving the paper, Benza was offered a job hosting Mysteries and Scandals, a program detailing true crimes and scandals involving celebrities, which necessitated a move to Los Angeles. It was on this show that Benza popularized the catchphrase "Fame, ain't it a bitch," which later became the title of his autobiography. The show ran for three seasons between 1998 and 2000.

In 2001, Benza had a short-lived late-night E! talk show known as A. J. After Hours; it was cancelled after low viewership and critical disdain.

In the same year during an appearance on The Howard Stern Show, Benza punched Stern staffer "Stuttering John" Melendez in the face, alleging Melendez was screening out positive listener calls about him. Melendez then made a prank call making fun of the failure of After Hours, provoking Benza further. The incident resulted in a temporary ban for Benza from Stern's show direct from WXRK general manager Tom Chiusano. He appeared again in October 2004, several months after Melendez had left the show.

In 2002, he starred in P.S. Your Cat is Dead!, a comedy film, starring and directed by Steve Guttenberg.

=== Recent appearances ===
In 2006, Benza hosted the reality show Cold Turkey II on ION Television.

He appeared as a co-host on the first five seasons of High Stakes Poker (along with Gabe Kaplan) on the GSN. He was replaced by poker pro Kara Scott for the show's sixth season. He wrote an open letter expressing his discontent with network executives at GSN in a post on his blog titled "Flop, A Turn, and a River of Shit".

In 2020, PokerGO relaunched High Stakes Poker and paired Kaplan and Benza in the commentary booth for the first time since Season 5.

Benza also had an acting role as L.C. Luco in the 2006 film Rocky Balboa. Benza appeared on the sixth season of Celebrity Fit Club on VH1, where he lost 12 lbs.

In 2008, Benza appeared in Gimme My Reality Show, a reality competition series on Fox Reality that followed a group of D-list celebrities with previous reality credentials as they battle for their chance to shine with their own show. But, midway through the show, he walked away from production. He cited not wanting to have his young children subjected to cameras inside their home.

In 2015, Benza's second book, 74 and Sunny—a memoir about his childhood on Long Island—was published by Simon & Schuster. George Gallo is attached to direct the picture, with Benza credited as screenwriter.

The following year Benza turned his energies to film and executive produced So B. It, a film based on the award-winning young adult book by Sarah Weeks. The movie premiered at the Los Angeles Film Festival in the summer. That same year he struck a deal with ReelzChannel to host Demons in the City of Angels and Case Closed with A.J. Benza.

In 2020, Benza guest starred in the Amazon Prime series "Gravesend".

Benza wrote columns for Star Magazine and RadarOnline. His daily podcast, Fame Is A Bitch—a mix of Hollywood gossip, cultural opinion and personal stories. He is married and living in Los Angeles with his wife and two children, Roxy and Rocco.

== Controversy ==
=== Harvey Weinstein allegations ===
In 2003, Benza became aware of Harvey Weinstein's affair with Georgina Chapman while he was married to his first wife. Upon discovering this information, Benza offered to provide Weinstein with gossip that would draw attention away from his affair. This was the beginning of a partnership between the two to preserve Weinstein's name.

When sexual harassment allegations against Weinstein began reaching the press in 2017, Weinstein reached out to Benza asking for his help. He discussed paying Benza "up to $20,000 a month" to investigate the claims made against him. Weinstein did not follow up on this offer.

== Bibliography ==
- Fame, Ain't it a Bitch, Miramax Books: May 2, 2001. ISBN 978-0-7868-6753-0
- '74 and Sunny, Gallery Books: July 2015. ISBN 978-1-4767-3878-9
