= Georgia Holt =

American singer-songwriter (1926–2022)

- Georgia Holt in the 1940s
- Born: Jackie Jean Crouch; June 9, 1926; Kensett, Arkansas, U.S.
- Died: December 10, 2022 (aged 96); Malibu, California, U.S.
- Other name: Georgia LaPiere
- Occupations: Singer-songwriter; actress; model
- Years active: 1932–2014
- Spouses: John Sarkisian (m. 1945; div. 1947) (m. 1965; div. 1966) Chris Alcaide (m. 1948; div. 1951) John Southall (m. 1951; div. 1955) Joseph Harper Collins (m. 1957; div. 1961) Gilbert Hartmann LaPiere (m. 1962; div. 1964) Hamilton T. Holt (m. 1970; div. 1974)
- Partner: Craig Spencer (1976–2022)
- Children: 2, including Cher
- Relatives: Chaz Bono (grandson); Elijah Blue Allman (grandson)
- Musical career
- Genre: Country

Georgia Holt (born Jackie Jean Crouch; June 9, 1926 – December 10, 2022) was an American singer-songwriter, model, and occasional bit part actress. She was best known for being the mother of Cher.

== Early life ==
Holt was born Jackie Jean Crouch on June 9, 1926, in Kensett, Arkansas, to Lynda Inez (née Gulley; 1913–2009) and Roy Malloy Crouch (1905–1969). Mr. Crouch was a baker at the time. Frequently moving back and forth between her separated parents before settling in Los Angeles, Holt estimated that she attended 17 junior high schools. Her father taught her how to sing and play guitar. Holt was of French, Irish, Dutch, German and English descent.

== Career ==
Holt sang on an Oklahoma City radio station when she was six years old, and by the age of 10, had sung with Bob Wills and the Texas Playboys. She won several talent and beauty competitions and had a number of minor television and film roles in the 1950s. These included Watch the Birdie (1950), Grounds for Marriage (1951) and Lovely to Look At (1952). However, by the mid-1950s, Holt's income was largely derived from working as a club singer.

After Holt performed in a singers' workshop (Phil Moore's "Get Your Act Together") in July 1978 at Studio One in Los Angeles, Mike Douglas, Merv Griffin, and Dinah Shore booked Holt to appear on their television talk shows. Holt also appeared as an audience polling member as part of a group of ten mothers of famous celebrities on the American game show Card Sharks on July 4–8, 1988.

Holt was the subject of the 2013 Lifetime documentary Dear Mom, Love Cher, which was executive produced by her daughter, Cher. The same year, Holt also released her album Honky Tonk Woman, which was recorded in 1982 with the TCB Band. It was Holt's discovery of the tapes which led to the documentary project. The album includes a duet with Cher titled "I'm Just Your Yesterday".

In 2013, Holt and Cher appeared together on The Tonight Show with Jay Leno and The Ellen DeGeneres Show to promote the documentary and album.

== Personal life ==
Holt was married and divorced seven times to six husbands. She married Cher's father, Armenian-American truck driver John Paul Sarkisian, on June 22, 1945 in Reno, Nevada; they briefly remarried and redivorced about 20 years later. Holt's second husband was actor Chris Alcaide. Her third husband was actor John Southall, with whom she had her second child, actress Georganne LaPiere. She later wed Joseph Harper Collins, after whom she married Gilbert Hartmann LaPiere, a bank manager who legally adopted Cher and Georganne and changed their surnames to LaPiere. Holt's last marriage was to Hamilton T. Holt, by whose surname she became known.

From 1976 until her death, Holt was in a relationship with Craig Spencer. Holt was 50 and running an antiques shop when she met the then 28-year-old Spencer, who was initially interested in her daughter Georganne.

In the late 1970s, Holt owned and operated a bedding store in Brentwood, California, called Granny's Cabbage Patch. It was paid for by Cher, who noted in her 2024 autobiography that it consistently operated at a financial loss until its closure.

Holt had two grandsons, Cher's children, Chaz Bono and Elijah Blue Allman.

On December 10, 2022, Cher announced on Twitter that Holt had died at age 96. Holt was survived by Spencer, her daughters and grandchildren.

== Filmography ==
| Year | Title | Role | Notes | Ref |
|---|---|---|---|---|
| 1950 | A Life of Her Own | Uncredited | Movies | |
| 1950 | Watch the Birdie | Grandpop's Girl | Movies | |
| 1951 | Grounds for Marriage | First Girl | Movies | |
| 1955 | The Adventures of Ozzie & Harriet | Bride | TV episode "David's Engagement" | |
| 1955 | Artists and Models | Uncredited | Movie | |
| 1956 | I Love Lucy | Jaques Marcel Model | TV episode "Lucy Gets a Paris Gown" | |
| 1966 | The Lucy Show | Model | TV episode "Lucy and Pat Collins" | |
| 1967 | The Lucy Show | Customer | TV episode "Lucy Gets Trapped" | |
| 1978 | Cher... Special | Herself | Voice only | |
| 1979 | The Mike Douglas Show | Herself | TV series | |
| 1980 | The Merv Griffin Show | Herself | TV series | |
| 1987 | Superstars and Their Moms | Herself | TV movie, also co-executive producer | |
| 1999 | Behind the Music | Herself | TV series documentary episode "Cher" | |
| 2011 | Becoming Chaz | Herself | TV series | |
| 2013 | Entertainment Tonight | Herself | Television infotainment series | |
| 2013 | The Tonight Show with Jay Leno | Herself | Late night comedy program (NBC-TV) | |
| 2013 | The Ellen DeGeneres Show | Herself | TV series | |
| 2013 | Good Morning America | Herself | Morning news program (ABC-TV) | |
| 2013 | Access Hollywood | Herself | Television infotainment series | |
| 2013 | Dear Mom, Love Cher | Herself | TV documentary | |
| 2013 | 20/20 | Herself | Weekly news program (on ABC-TV) | |
| 2013 | Sunday Morning | Herself | Weekly news program | |
| 2014 | RuPaul's Drag Race | Herself/Guest Judge | Season 6 episode 9; "Queens of Talk" | |

== Discography ==
| Title | Album details | Peak chart positions | |
| Title | Album details | US Country | US Heat |
|---|---|---|---|
| Honky Tonk Woman | Release date: April 30, 2013 | 43 | 13 |

== Bibliography ==
- Holt, Georgia; Quinn, Phyllis; Russell, Sue (1989). Star Mothers – The Moms Behind the Celebrities. New York: St. Martin's Press. ISBN 0-312-91540-3.
