= Take Me Home Tour (Cher) =

1979–1982 concert tour by Cher

- Residency / World tour by Cher
- Poster for shows in Las Vegas
- Associated album: Take Me Home
- Start date: June 3, 1979
- End date: August 11, 1982
- No. of shows: 302 in North America; 5 in Europe; 4 in South Africa; 8 in Australia; 319 total

Cher concert chronology
- Two the Hard Way Tour (1977); Take Me Home Tour (1979–82); Heart of Stone Tour (1989–90)

The Take Me Home Tour (Note: Cher's 1979–1982 concert series had no official name and was promoted under various titles, including "Cher", "Cher in Concert", "The Cher Show" and "The Cher Tour". Over time, it became known as the "Take Me Home Tour", a name adopted by Cher and biographers.) was the first solo concert tour by American singer-actress Cher. It premiered in June 1979 at the Sahara Reno Opera House Theatre in Reno, featuring an elaborate production and cast assembled by Joe Layton. The tour, which concluded in August 1982, marked Cher's solo debut on the nightclub circuit.

== Background ==
Running from June 1979 to August 1982, most performances of the Take Me Home Tour took place at the Circus Maximus Showroom at Caesars Palace in Las Vegas. Cher performed two shows nightly, at 9 p.m. and 12:30 a.m., seven days a week, earning $300,000 weekly. Although Cher took the show to other North American cities, as well as Europe, South Africa and Australia, the media often labeled it a Vegas residency, with shows in other cities marketed as Cher taking her "Vegas act" on the road.

This residency phase shaped both public perception and Cher's own view of her career. Despite its financial success, she found the experience unfulfilling, describing a Vegas residency as an "elephant's graveyard" for fading stars. She later commented, "I was making a fortune ... but I was dying inside. Everyone kept saying, 'Cher, there are people who would give anything to have standing room only at Caesars Palace. It would be the pinnacle of their careers.' And I kept thinking, 'Yes, I should be satisfied' ... But I wasn't."

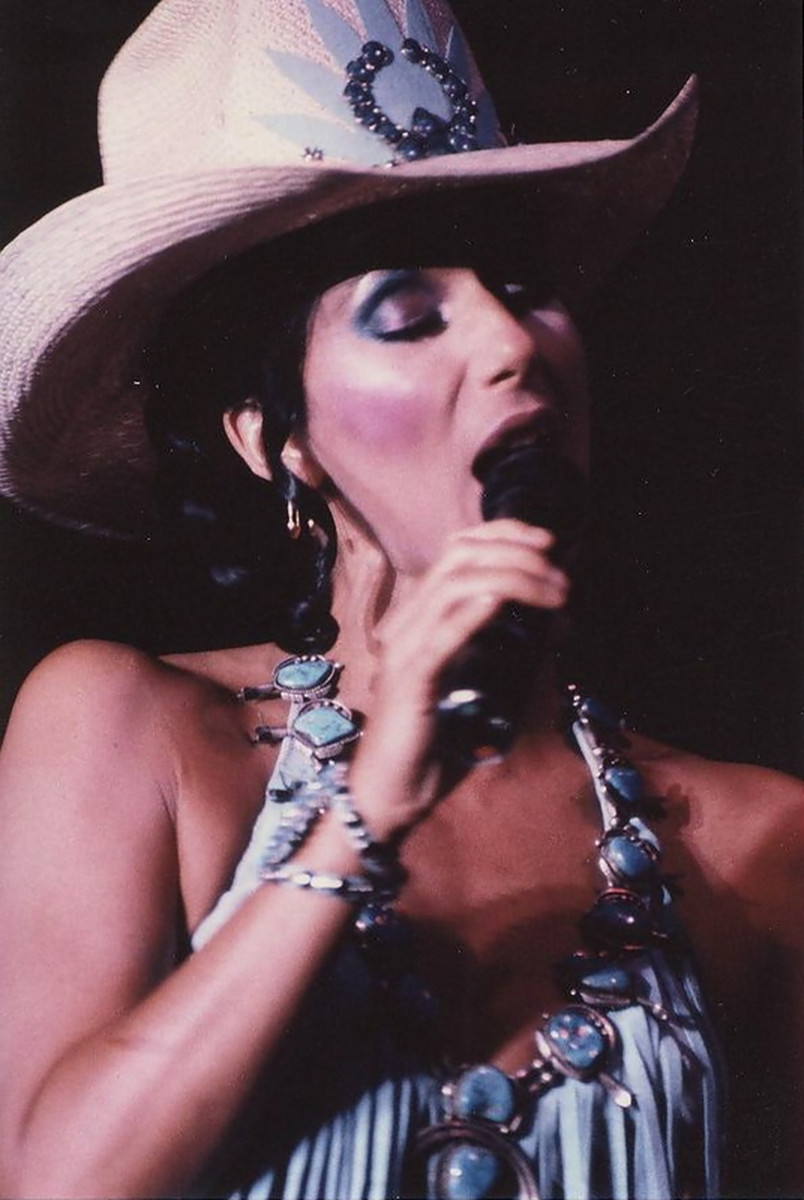
Cher during a Take Me Home Tour concert in 1981

The Press of Atlantic City called the show "the biggest cabaret act ever seen on any stage". The tour spawned two television specials: Standing Room Only: Cher in Concert (1981) and Cher... A Celebration at Caesars (1983), with the latter earning her a CableACE Award for Best Actress in a Variety Program. A concert from Monte Carlo was also taped and aired as the premiere episode of The Monte Carlo Show in September 1980.

Cher described the show as "a bit Sonny & Cher-ish", blending cabaret, disco and rock and roll. With twelve costume changes, she never wore any outfit for more than eight minutes. Inspired by her television shows Cher, Cher... Special and Cher... and Other Fantasies, the concert featured three backing singers, six dancers and elaborate props, including a mechanical bull named El Toro and a giant high-heeled shoe. In 1980, one of Cher's midnight shows at Caesars Palace was fined $180 by Nevada state officials for exceeding the legal sound limit of 115 decibels.

The concert also included three drag performers impersonating Bette Midler, Cher and Diana Ross. During Cher's costume changes, Kenny Sacha (as Midler) performed "In the Mood", and J.C. Gaynor (as Ross) performed "I'm Coming Out". Audiences were often unaware they were impersonators until the end of the show, when Cher introduced them out of drag. She recalled, "We got Diana and Bette to record their voices in the intro but I didn't think it would fool them. I was never afraid to take risks like that." After their performances, Cher regularly joined them for a rendition of "Friends". Russell Elliott opened the show as Cher. Maclean's journalist Elio Iannacci recognized Cher as "one of the first to bring drag to the masses".

During the tour, Cher also released two solo studio albums: Prisoner (1979), her second on Casablanca Records, and I Paralyze (1982), her sole release on Columbia Records. Neither charted on the Billboard 200, and both failed to produce a top-40 single. In 1980, Cher balanced her solo performances with her role as lead vocalist of the rock band Black Rose, co-founded with guitarist Les Dudek, continuing both commitments until the band parted ways after releasing their self-titled album. During this period she also released two collaborations: "Bad Love" (her last solo recording for Casablanca), co-written and recorded with Giorgio Moroder for the soundtrack to Foxes (1980); and "Dead Ringer for Love" (1981), a duet with Meat Loaf that reached number five on the UK Singles Chart—her first UK chart entry since "Dark Lady" (1974).

== Set list ==
=== June 1979 to February 1981 ===
1. "Ain't Nobody's Business"
2. "Signed, Sealed, Delivered I'm Yours"
3. "Fire"
4. "Easy To Be Hard"
5. "The Way of Love"
6. "Ain't No Mountain High Enough" (performed by J.C. Gaynor and Cher)
7. "Boogie Woogie Bugle Boy" (performed by Kenny Sacha)
8. "Friends" (performed by Sacha, Gaynor, and Cher)
9. "Jailhouse Rock" / "Dream Lover" / "Great Balls Of Fire"
10. "Rockin' Robin"
11. "Johnny B. Goode"
12. "Dedicated to the One I Love"
13. "Hand Jive" / "Honky Tonk Women" / "Old Time Rock and Roll"
14. "Take It to the Limit"
15. "Take Me Home"
16. "Takin' It to the Streets"
17. "Ain't Got No Money"

=== May 1981 to August 1982 ===
1. "Could I Be Dreaming"
2. "Signed, Sealed, Delivered I'm Yours"
3. "You Make My Dreams"
4. "Da Ya Think I'm Sexy?"
5. "Those Shoes"
6. "Out Here On My Own"
7. "Take It to the Limit"
8. "I'm Coming Out" (performed by J.C. Gaynor)
9. "In the Mood" (performed by Kenny Sacha)
10. "Friends" (performed by Sacha, Gaynor and Cher)
11. "Lookin' for Love" (contains elements of "Devil Went Down to Georgia")
12. "When Will I Be Loved"
13. "More Than You Know"
14. "Fame"

=== Notes ===
- "Git Down (Guitar Groupie)" was performed at O'Keefe Centre on July 23, 1979.
- "My Song (Too Far Gone)" was performed at O'Keefe Centre from July 23 to 29, 1979.
- "Still The One" and "My Song (Too Far Gone)" were performed at the Universal Amphitheatre from July 31 to August 2, 1979.
- "Whip It" and "Turning Japanese" were performed on select dates in 1981.

== Tour dates ==
=== 1979 ===
The 1979 leg of Cher's Take Me Home Tour had 83 dates.

Date	City	Country	Venue	Opening acts	Ref.
June 3, 1979	Reno	United States	Sahara Reno Opera House Theatre	—N/a	
June 4, 1979	Reno	United States	Sahara Reno Opera House Theatre	—N/a	
June 5, 1979	Reno	United States	Sahara Reno Opera House Theatre	—N/a	
June 6, 1979	Reno	United States	Sahara Reno Opera House Theatre	—N/a	
June 7, 1979	Reno	United States	Sahara Reno Opera House Theatre	—N/a	
June 8, 1979	Reno	United States	Sahara Reno Opera House Theatre	—N/a	
June 9, 1979	Reno	United States	Sahara Reno Opera House Theatre	—N/a	
June 10, 1979	Reno	United States	Sahara Reno Opera House Theatre	—N/a	
June 11, 1979	Reno	United States	Sahara Reno Opera House Theatre	—N/a	
June 12, 1979	Reno	United States	Sahara Reno Opera House Theatre	—N/a	
June 13, 1979	Reno	United States	Sahara Reno Opera House Theatre	—N/a	
June 14, 1979	Reno	United States	Sahara Reno Opera House Theatre	—N/a	
June 15, 1979	Reno	United States	Sahara Reno Opera House Theatre	—N/a	
June 16, 1979	Reno	United States	Sahara Reno Opera House Theatre	—N/a	
June 17, 1979	Reno	United States	Sahara Reno Opera House Theatre	—N/a	
June 18, 1979	Reno	United States	Sahara Reno Opera House Theatre	—N/a	
June 19, 1979	Reno	United States	Sahara Reno Opera House Theatre	—N/a	
June 29, 1979	Las Vegas	United States	Circus Maximus	—N/a	
July 9, 1979	Atlantic City	United States	Resorts International Grand Ballroom	—N/a	
July 10, 1979	Atlantic City	United States	Resorts International Grand Ballroom	—N/a	
July 11, 1979	Atlantic City	United States	Resorts International Grand Ballroom	—N/a	
July 12, 1979	Atlantic City	United States	Resorts International Grand Ballroom	—N/a	
July 13, 1979	Atlantic City	United States	Resorts International Grand Ballroom	—N/a	
July 14, 1979	Atlantic City	United States	Resorts International Grand Ballroom	—N/a	
July 16, 1979	Washington, D.C.	United States	Kennedy Center Opera House	—N/a	
July 17, 1979	Washington, D.C.	United States	Kennedy Center Opera House	—N/a	
July 18, 1979	Los Angeles	United States	Universal Amphitheatre	—N/a	
July 19, 1979	Los Angeles	United States	Universal Amphitheatre	—N/a	
July 21, 1979	Washington, D.C.	United States	Kennedy Center Opera House	—N/a	
July 22, 1979	Washington, D.C.	United States	Kennedy Center Opera House	—N/a	
July 23, 1979	Toronto	Canada	O'Keefe Centre	—N/a	
July 24, 1979	Toronto	Canada	O'Keefe Centre	—N/a	
July 25, 1979	Toronto	Canada	O'Keefe Centre	—N/a	
July 26, 1979	Toronto	Canada	O'Keefe Centre	—N/a	
July 27, 1979	Toronto	Canada	O'Keefe Centre	—N/a	
July 28, 1979	Toronto	Canada	O'Keefe Centre	—N/a	
July 29, 1979	Toronto	Canada	O'Keefe Centre	—N/a	
July 31, 1979	Los Angeles	United States	Universal Amphitheatre	Sister Sledge	
August 1, 1979	Los Angeles	United States	Universal Amphitheatre	Sister Sledge	
August 2, 1979	Los Angeles	United States	Universal Amphitheatre	Sister Sledge	
August 16, 1979	Las Vegas	United States	Circus Maximus	—N/a	
August 17, 1979	Las Vegas	United States	Circus Maximus	—N/a	
August 18, 1979	Las Vegas	United States	Circus Maximus	—N/a	
August 19, 1979	Las Vegas	United States	Circus Maximus	—N/a	
August 20, 1979	Las Vegas	United States	Circus Maximus	—N/a	
August 21, 1979	Las Vegas	United States	Circus Maximus	—N/a	
August 22, 1979	Las Vegas	United States	Circus Maximus	—N/a	
August 23, 1979	Las Vegas	United States	Circus Maximus	—N/a	
August 24, 1979	Las Vegas	United States	Circus Maximus	—N/a	
August 25, 1979	Las Vegas	United States	Circus Maximus	—N/a	
August 26, 1979	Las Vegas	United States	Circus Maximus	—N/a	
August 27, 1979	Las Vegas	United States	Circus Maximus	—N/a	
August 28, 1979	Las Vegas	United States	Circus Maximus	—N/a	
August 29, 1979	Las Vegas	United States	Circus Maximus	—N/a	
August 31, 1979	Las Vegas	United States	Circus Maximus	—N/a	
October 29, 1979	Stateline	United States	Sahara Tahoe	—N/a	
October 30, 1979	Stateline	United States	Sahara Tahoe	—N/a	
October 31, 1979	Stateline	United States	Sahara Tahoe	—N/a	
November 1, 1979	Stateline	United States	Sahara Tahoe	—N/a	
November 2, 1979	Stateline	United States	Sahara Tahoe	—N/a	
November 3, 1979	Stateline	United States	Sahara Tahoe	—N/a	
November 4, 1979	Stateline	United States	Sahara Tahoe	—N/a	
November 5, 1979	Stateline	United States	Sahara Tahoe	—N/a	
November 6, 1979	Stateline	United States	Sahara Tahoe	—N/a	
November 7, 1979	Stateline	United States	Sahara Tahoe	—N/a	
November 8, 1979	Stateline	United States	Sahara Tahoe	—N/a	
November 9, 1979	Stateline	United States	Sahara Tahoe	—N/a	
November 10, 1979	Stateline	United States	Sahara Tahoe	—N/a	
November 11, 1979	Stateline	United States	Sahara Tahoe	—N/a	
November 15, 1979	Las Vegas	United States	Circus Maximus	—N/a	
November 16, 1979	Las Vegas	United States	Circus Maximus	—N/a	
November 17, 1979	Las Vegas	United States	Circus Maximus	—N/a	
November 18, 1979	Las Vegas	United States	Circus Maximus	—N/a	
November 19, 1979	Las Vegas	United States	Circus Maximus	—N/a	
November 20, 1979	Las Vegas	United States	Circus Maximus	—N/a	
November 21, 1979	Las Vegas	United States	Circus Maximus	—N/a	
November 22, 1979	Las Vegas	United States	Circus Maximus	—N/a	
November 23, 1979	Las Vegas	United States	Circus Maximus	—N/a	
November 24, 1979	Las Vegas	United States	Circus Maximus	—N/a	
November 25, 1979	Las Vegas	United States	Circus Maximus	—N/a	
November 26, 1979	Las Vegas	United States	Circus Maximus	—N/a	
November 27, 1979	Las Vegas	United States	Circus Maximus	—N/a	
November 28, 1979	Las Vegas	United States	Circus Maximus	—N/a	

=== 1980 ===
The tour's 1980 leg had 95 dates.

Date	City	Country	Venue	Opening acts	Ref.
January 10, 1980	Las Vegas	United States	Circus Maximus	—N/a	
January 11, 1980	Las Vegas	United States	Circus Maximus	—N/a	
January 12, 1980	Las Vegas	United States	Circus Maximus	—N/a	
January 13, 1980	Las Vegas	United States	Circus Maximus	—N/a	
January 14, 1980	Las Vegas	United States	Circus Maximus	—N/a	
January 15, 1980	Las Vegas	United States	Circus Maximus	—N/a	
January 16, 1980	Las Vegas	United States	Circus Maximus	—N/a	
January 25, 1980	Stateline	United States	Sahara Tahoe	—N/a	
January 26, 1980	Stateline	United States	Sahara Tahoe	—N/a	
January 27, 1980	Stateline	United States	Sahara Tahoe	—N/a	
February 1, 1980	Stateline	United States	Sahara Tahoe	—N/a	
February 2, 1980	Stateline	United States	Sahara Tahoe	—N/a	
February 3, 1980	Stateline	United States	Sahara Tahoe	—N/a	
April 3, 1980	Atlantic City	United States	Resorts International	—N/a	
April 4, 1980	Atlantic City	United States	Resorts International	—N/a	
April 5, 1980	Atlantic City	United States	Resorts International	—N/a	
April 6, 1980	Las Vegas	United States	Circus Maximus	—N/a	
April 7, 1980	Las Vegas	United States	Circus Maximus	—N/a	
April 8, 1980	Las Vegas	United States	Circus Maximus	—N/a	
April 9, 1980	Las Vegas	United States	Circus Maximus	—N/a	
April 10, 1980	Las Vegas	United States	Circus Maximus	—N/a	
April 11, 1980	Las Vegas	United States	Circus Maximus	—N/a	
April 12, 1980	Las Vegas	United States	Circus Maximus	—N/a	
April 13, 1980	Las Vegas	United States	Circus Maximus	—N/a	
April 14, 1980	Las Vegas	United States	Circus Maximus	—N/a	
April 15, 1980	Las Vegas	United States	Circus Maximus	—N/a	
April 16, 1980	Las Vegas	United States	Circus Maximus	—N/a	
May 10, 1980	Monte Carlo	Monaco	Salle des Étoiles	—N/a	
May 12, 1980	Paris	France	L'Olympia	—N/a	
May 14, 1980	London	England	Hammersmith Odeon	—N/a	
May 22, 1980	Las Vegas	United States	Circus Maximus	—N/a	
May 23, 1980	Las Vegas	United States	Circus Maximus	—N/a	
May 24, 1980	Las Vegas	United States	Circus Maximus	—N/a	
May 25, 1980	Las Vegas	United States	Circus Maximus	—N/a	
May 26, 1980	Las Vegas	United States	Circus Maximus	—N/a	
May 27, 1980	Las Vegas	United States	Circus Maximus	—N/a	
May 28, 1980	Las Vegas	United States	Circus Maximus	—N/a	
June 5, 1980	Las Vegas	United States	Circus Maximus	—N/a	
June 6, 1980	Las Vegas	United States	Circus Maximus	—N/a	
June 7, 1980	Las Vegas	United States	Circus Maximus	—N/a	
June 8, 1980	Las Vegas	United States	Circus Maximus	—N/a	
June 10, 1980	Las Vegas	United States	Circus Maximus	—N/a	
June 11, 1980	Las Vegas	United States	Circus Maximus	—N/a	
June 14, 1980	Atlantic City	United States	Resorts International	—N/a	
June 15, 1980	Atlantic City	United States	Resorts International	—N/a	
June 16, 1980	Atlantic City	United States	Resorts International	—N/a	
June 17, 1980	Atlantic City	United States	Resorts International	—N/a	
June 18, 1980	Atlantic City	United States	Resorts International	—N/a	
June 19, 1980	Atlantic City	United States	Resorts International	—N/a	
July 3, 1980	Las Vegas	United States	Circus Maximus	—N/a	
July 4, 1980	Las Vegas	United States	Circus Maximus	—N/a	
July 5, 1980	Las Vegas	United States	Circus Maximus	—N/a	
July 6, 1980	Las Vegas	United States	Circus Maximus	—N/a	
July 8, 1980	Las Vegas	United States	Circus Maximus	—N/a	
July 9, 1980	Las Vegas	United States	Circus Maximus	—N/a	
July 14, 1980	Atlantic City	United States	Resorts International	—N/a	
July 15, 1980	Atlantic City	United States	Resorts International	—N/a	
July 16, 1980	Atlantic City	United States	Resorts International	—N/a	
July 17, 1980	Atlantic City	United States	Resorts International	—N/a	
July 18, 1980	Atlantic City	United States	Resorts International	—N/a	
July 19, 1980	Atlantic City	United States	Resorts International	—N/a	
July 20, 1980	Atlantic City	United States	Resorts International	—N/a	
August 28, 1980	Las Vegas	United States	Circus Maximus	—N/a	
August 29, 1980	Las Vegas	United States	Circus Maximus	—N/a	
August 30, 1980	Las Vegas	United States	Circus Maximus	—N/a	
August 31, 1980	Las Vegas	United States	Circus Maximus	—N/a	
September 2, 1980	Stateline	United States	Caesars Tahoe	—N/a	
September 3, 1980	Stateline	United States	Caesars Tahoe	—N/a	
September 11, 1980	Las Vegas	United States	Circus Maximus	—N/a	
September 12, 1980	Las Vegas	United States	Circus Maximus	—N/a	
September 13, 1980	Las Vegas	United States	Circus Maximus	—N/a	
September 14, 1980	Las Vegas	United States	Circus Maximus	—N/a	
September 16, 1980	Las Vegas	United States	Circus Maximus	—N/a	
September 17, 1980	Las Vegas	United States	Circus Maximus	—N/a	
September 18, 1980	Las Vegas	United States	Circus Maximus	—N/a	
September 19, 1980	Las Vegas	United States	Circus Maximus	—N/a	
September 20, 1980	Las Vegas	United States	Circus Maximus	—N/a	
September 21, 1980	Las Vegas	United States	Circus Maximus	—N/a	
September 22, 1980	Las Vegas	United States	Circus Maximus	—N/a	
September 23, 1980	Las Vegas	United States	Circus Maximus	—N/a	
September 24, 1980	Las Vegas	United States	Circus Maximus	—N/a	
September 25, 1980	Stateline	United States	Caesars Tahoe	—N/a	
September 26, 1980	Stateline	United States	Caesars Tahoe	—N/a	
September 27, 1980	Stateline	United States	Caesars Tahoe	—N/a	
September 28, 1980	Stateline	United States	Caesars Tahoe	—N/a	
September 29, 1980	Stateline	United States	Caesars Tahoe	—N/a	
September 30, 1980	Stateline	United States	Caesars Tahoe	—N/a	
October 1, 1980	Stateline	United States	Caesars Tahoe	—N/a	
October 2, 1980	Stateline	United States	Caesars Tahoe	—N/a	
November 6, 1980	Las Vegas	United States	Circus Maximus	—N/a	
November 7, 1980	Las Vegas	United States	Circus Maximus	—N/a	
November 8, 1980	Las Vegas	United States	Circus Maximus	—N/a	
November 9, 1980	Las Vegas	United States	Circus Maximus	—N/a	
November 11, 1980	Las Vegas	United States	Circus Maximus	—N/a	
November 12, 1980	Las Vegas	United States	Circus Maximus	—N/a	

=== 1981 ===
The tour's 1981 leg had 100 dates.

Date	City	Country	Venue	Opening acts	Ref.
January 22, 1981	Las Vegas	United States	Circus Maximus	—N/a	
January 23, 1981	Las Vegas	United States	Circus Maximus	—N/a	
January 24, 1981	Las Vegas	United States	Circus Maximus	—N/a	
January 25, 1981	Las Vegas	United States	Circus Maximus	—N/a	
January 27, 1981	Las Vegas	United States	Circus Maximus	—N/a	
January 28, 1981	Las Vegas	United States	Circus Maximus	—N/a	
February 5, 1981	Las Vegas	United States	Circus Maximus	—N/a	
February 6, 1981	Las Vegas	United States	Circus Maximus	—N/a	
February 7, 1981	Las Vegas	United States	Circus Maximus	—N/a	
February 8, 1981	Las Vegas	United States	Circus Maximus	—N/a	
February 9, 1981	Las Vegas	United States	Circus Maximus	—N/a	
February 10, 1981	Las Vegas	United States	Circus Maximus	—N/a	
February 11, 1981	Las Vegas	United States	Circus Maximus	—N/a	
May 28, 1981	Las Vegas	United States	Circus Maximus	—N/a	
May 29, 1981	Las Vegas	United States	Circus Maximus	—N/a	
May 30, 1981	Las Vegas	United States	Circus Maximus	—N/a	
May 31, 1981	Las Vegas	United States	Circus Maximus	—N/a	
June 1, 1981	Las Vegas	United States	Circus Maximus	—N/a	
June 2, 1981	Las Vegas	United States	Circus Maximus	—N/a	
June 3, 1981	Las Vegas	United States	Circus Maximus	—N/a	
June 5, 1981	Los Angeles	United States	Greek Theatre	Martin Mull	
June 6, 1981	Los Angeles	United States	Greek Theatre	Martin Mull	
June 7, 1981	Los Angeles	United States	Greek Theatre	Martin Mull	
June 8, 1981	Los Angeles	United States	Greek Theatre	Martin Mull	
June 18, 1981	Las Vegas	United States	Circus Maximus	—N/a	
June 19, 1981	Las Vegas	United States	Circus Maximus	—N/a	
June 20, 1981	Las Vegas	United States	Circus Maximus	—N/a	
June 21, 1981	Las Vegas	United States	Circus Maximus	—N/a	
June 22, 1981	Las Vegas	United States	Circus Maximus	—N/a	
June 23, 1981	Las Vegas	United States	Circus Maximus	—N/a	
June 24, 1981	Las Vegas	United States	Circus Maximus	—N/a	
June 25, 1981	Las Vegas	United States	Circus Maximus	—N/a	
June 26, 1981	Las Vegas	United States	Circus Maximus	—N/a	
June 27, 1981	Las Vegas	United States	Circus Maximus	—N/a	
June 28, 1981	Las Vegas	United States	Circus Maximus	—N/a	
June 29, 1981	Las Vegas	United States	Circus Maximus	—N/a	
June 30, 1981	Las Vegas	United States	Circus Maximus	—N/a	
July 1, 1981	Las Vegas	United States	Circus Maximus	—N/a	
July 8, 1981	Las Vegas	United States	Circus Maximus	—N/a	
July 9, 1981	Las Vegas	United States	Circus Maximus	—N/a	
July 10, 1981	Las Vegas	United States	Circus Maximus	—N/a	
July 11, 1981	Las Vegas	United States	Circus Maximus	—N/a	
July 12, 1981	Las Vegas	United States	Circus Maximus	—N/a	
July 13, 1981	Las Vegas	United States	Circus Maximus	—N/a	
July 14, 1981	Las Vegas	United States	Circus Maximus	—N/a	
July 16, 1981	Stateline	United States	Caesars Tahoe	—N/a	
July 17, 1981	Stateline	United States	Caesars Tahoe	—N/a	
July 18, 1981	Stateline	United States	Caesars Tahoe	—N/a	
July 19, 1981	Stateline	United States	Caesars Tahoe	—N/a	
July 20, 1981	Stateline	United States	Caesars Tahoe	—N/a	
July 21, 1981	Stateline	United States	Caesars Tahoe	—N/a	
July 22, 1981	Stateline	United States	Caesars Tahoe	—N/a	
July 31, 1981	Monte Carlo	Monaco	Salle des Étoiles	—N/a	
August 1, 1981	Monte Carlo	Monaco	Salle des Étoiles	—N/a	
August 6, 1981	North West	South Africa	Sun City Hotel	—N/a	
August 7, 1981	North West	South Africa	Sun City Hotel	—N/a	
August 8, 1981	North West	South Africa	Sun City Hotel	—N/a	
August 9, 1981	North West	South Africa	Sun City Hotel	—N/a	
August 17, 1981	Atlantic City	United States	Resorts International	Freddie Roman	
August 18, 1981	Atlantic City	United States	Resorts International	Freddie Roman	
August 19, 1981	Atlantic City	United States	Resorts International	Freddie Roman	
August 20, 1981	Atlantic City	United States	Resorts International	Freddie Roman	
August 21, 1981	Atlantic City	United States	Resorts International	Freddie Roman	
August 22, 1981	Atlantic City	United States	Resorts International	Freddie Roman	
August 27, 1981	Las Vegas	United States	Circus Maximus	—N/a	
August 28, 1981	Las Vegas	United States	Circus Maximus	—N/a	
August 29, 1981	Las Vegas	United States	Circus Maximus	—N/a	
August 30, 1981	Las Vegas	United States	Circus Maximus	—N/a	
August 31, 1981	Las Vegas	United States	Circus Maximus	—N/a	
September 1, 1981	Las Vegas	United States	Circus Maximus	—N/a	
September 2, 1981	Las Vegas	United States	Circus Maximus	—N/a	
September 10, 1981	Las Vegas	United States	Circus Maximus	—N/a	
September 11, 1981	Las Vegas	United States	Circus Maximus	—N/a	
September 12, 1981	Las Vegas	United States	Circus Maximus	—N/a	
September 13, 1981	Las Vegas	United States	Circus Maximus	—N/a	
September 14, 1981	Las Vegas	United States	Circus Maximus	—N/a	
September 15, 1981	Las Vegas	United States	Circus Maximus	—N/a	
September 16, 1981	Las Vegas	United States	Circus Maximus	—N/a	
October 22, 1981	Las Vegas	United States	Circus Maximus	—N/a	
October 23, 1981	Las Vegas	United States	Circus Maximus	—N/a	
October 24, 1981	Las Vegas	United States	Circus Maximus	—N/a	
October 25, 1981	Las Vegas	United States	Circus Maximus	—N/a	
October 26, 1981	Las Vegas	United States	Circus Maximus	—N/a	
October 27, 1981	Las Vegas	United States	Circus Maximus	—N/a	
October 28, 1981	Las Vegas	United States	Circus Maximus	—N/a	
November 12, 1981	Las Vegas	United States	Circus Maximus	—N/a	
November 13, 1981	Las Vegas	United States	Circus Maximus	—N/a	
November 14, 1981	Las Vegas	United States	Circus Maximus	—N/a	
November 15, 1981	Las Vegas	United States	Circus Maximus	—N/a	
November 16, 1981	Las Vegas	United States	Circus Maximus	—N/a	
November 17, 1981	Las Vegas	United States	Circus Maximus	—N/a	
November 18, 1981	Las Vegas	United States	Circus Maximus	—N/a	
November 25, 1981	Sydney	Australia	Capitol Theatre	Digger Revell and the Denvermen	
November 26, 1981	Sydney	Australia	Capitol Theatre	Digger Revell and the Denvermen	
November 27, 1981	Sydney	Australia	Capitol Theatre	Digger Revell and the Denvermen	
November 28, 1981	Sydney	Australia	Capitol Theatre	Digger Revell and the Denvermen	
November 30, 1981	Sydney	Australia	Capitol Theatre	Digger Revell and the Denvermen	
December 4, 1981	Melbourne	Australia	Palais Theatre	—N/a	
December 5, 1981	Melbourne	Australia	Palais Theatre	—N/a	
December 6, 1981	Melbourne	Australia	Palais Theatre	—N/a	

=== 1982 ===
The tour's 1982 leg had 41 dates.

Date	City	Country	Venue	Opening acts	Ref.
March 11, 1982	Las Vegas	United States	Circus Maximus	—N/a	
March 12, 1982	Las Vegas	United States	Circus Maximus	—N/a	
March 13, 1982	Las Vegas	United States	Circus Maximus	—N/a	
March 14, 1982	Las Vegas	United States	Circus Maximus	—N/a	
March 15, 1982	Las Vegas	United States	Circus Maximus	—N/a	
March 16, 1982	Las Vegas	United States	Circus Maximus	—N/a	
March 17, 1982	Las Vegas	United States	Circus Maximus	—N/a	
June 19, 1982	Las Vegas	United States	Circus Maximus	—N/a	
June 20, 1982	Las Vegas	United States	Circus Maximus	—N/a	
June 21, 1982	Las Vegas	United States	Circus Maximus	—N/a	
June 22, 1982	Las Vegas	United States	Circus Maximus	—N/a	
June 24, 1982	Las Vegas	United States	Circus Maximus	—N/a	
June 25, 1982	Las Vegas	United States	Circus Maximus	—N/a	
July 1, 1982	Las Vegas	United States	Circus Maximus	—N/a	
July 2, 1982	Las Vegas	United States	Circus Maximus	—N/a	
July 3, 1982	Las Vegas	United States	Circus Maximus	—N/a	
July 4, 1982	Las Vegas	United States	Circus Maximus	—N/a	
July 5, 1982	Las Vegas	United States	Circus Maximus	—N/a	
July 6, 1982	Las Vegas	United States	Circus Maximus	—N/a	
July 7, 1982	Las Vegas	United States	Circus Maximus	—N/a	
July 8, 1982	Las Vegas	United States	Circus Maximus	—N/a	
July 9, 1982	Las Vegas	United States	Circus Maximus	—N/a	
July 10, 1982	Las Vegas	United States	Circus Maximus	—N/a	
July 11, 1982	Las Vegas	United States	Circus Maximus	—N/a	
July 12, 1982	Las Vegas	United States	Circus Maximus	—N/a	
July 13, 1982	Las Vegas	United States	Circus Maximus	—N/a	
July 14, 1982	Las Vegas	United States	Circus Maximus	—N/a	
July 29, 1982	Las Vegas	United States	Circus Maximus	—N/a	
July 30, 1982	Las Vegas	United States	Circus Maximus	—N/a	
July 31, 1982	Las Vegas	United States	Circus Maximus	—N/a	
August 1, 1982	Las Vegas	United States	Circus Maximus	—N/a	
August 2, 1982	Las Vegas	United States	Circus Maximus	—N/a	
August 3, 1982	Las Vegas	United States	Circus Maximus	—N/a	
August 4, 1982	Las Vegas	United States	Circus Maximus	—N/a	
August 5, 1982	Las Vegas	United States	Circus Maximus	—N/a	
August 6, 1982	Las Vegas	United States	Circus Maximus	—N/a	
August 7, 1982	Las Vegas	United States	Circus Maximus	—N/a	
August 8, 1982	Las Vegas	United States	Circus Maximus	—N/a	
August 9, 1982	Las Vegas	United States	Circus Maximus	—N/a	
August 10, 1982	Las Vegas	United States	Circus Maximus	—N/a	
August 11, 1982	Las Vegas	United States	Circus Maximus	—N/a	

=== Cancelled shows ===
Date	City	Country	Venue	Reason	Ref.
July 1981	Montreal	Canada	Place des Arts	—N/a	
July 13, 1981	Hoffman Estates	United States	Poplar Creek Music Theater	—N/a	
July 14, 1981	Hoffman Estates	United States	Poplar Creek Music Theater	—N/a	
September 4, 1981	Los Angeles	United States	Irvine Meadows Amphitheatre	—N/a	
September 5, 1981	Los Angeles	United States	Irvine Meadows Amphitheatre	—N/a	

== Broadcasts and recordings ==
- The Monte Carlo Show: Cher (20th Century Fox Television; aired September 14, 1980)
- Standing Room Only: Cher in Concert (HBO; aired February 8, 1981)
- Cher... A Celebration at Caesars (Paramount / Showtime; aired April 21, 1983)

== Personnel ==
- Lead vocals: Cher
- Background vocals: Michelle Aller
- Background vocals: Warren Ham
- Background vocals: Petsye Powell
- Produced and Staged: Joe Layton
- Musical Director: Gary Scott
- Dancer: Wayne Bascomb
- Dancer: Damita Jo Freeman
- Dancer: Warren Lucas
- Dancer: Mykal Perea
- Dancer: Randy Wander

=== Impersonators ===
- Kenny Sacha as Bette Midler
- Russel Elliot as Cher (in the interlude)
- J.C. Gaynor as Diana Ross

=== Costumes ===
- Costumes Designed: Bob Mackie
- Wardrobe: Alan Trugman
- Wardrobe: Debbie Paull
- Wigs: Renata

=== Band ===
- Saxophone: Warren Ham
- Drums: Gary Ferguson
- Guitarist: Ron "Rocket" Ritchotte
- Ken Rarick
- Bob Parr
