= Wasn't It Good =

Wasn't It Good may refer to:

- Wasn't It Good (Cher song), 1979
- Wasn't It Good (Tina Arena song), 1995
