= Prisoner (Cher album) =

Studio album by Cher
- Released: October 22, 1979
- Recorded: 1979
- Studio: Studio 55, Los Angeles, California
- Genre: Rock; disco
- Length: 37:13
- Label: Casablanca
- Producer: Bob Esty

Cher chronology
Take Me Home (1979)	Prisoner (1979)	Black Rose (1980)

Singles from Prisoner
- 1. "Hell On Wheels" Released: August 1979; 2. "Holdin' Out for Love" Released: November 1979

Prisoner is the sixteenth studio album by American singer-actress Cher, released on October 22, 1979, by Casablanca Records. The album was a commercial failure and failed to chart. "Hell on Wheels" was released as the lead single and had a moderate success, peaking at number fifty-nine on the Billboard Hot 100.

== Album information ==
Prisoner (initially planned to be released under the title Mirror Image) was Cher's second album of 1979, and was released nine months after Take Me Home.

This was the last album of Cher's to date to be produced by Bob Esty, with Esty and Michelle Aller contributing several of the songs. Compared to the disco style of Take Me Home, Prisoner featured a relatively rock sound. Prisoner also marked the first time that Cher released an album featuring songs that were written exclusively for her.

The producer wanted to take advantage of Cher's image and the media obsession with her. On the front cover of the album, she appears to be completely naked, with long hair draped to cover her breasts. She is wrapped in chains and wearing a wide metal collar. Her wrists and ankles are tightly shackled with wide metal bands. The cover spurred controversy among some women's rights groups for her perceived "sex slave" image.

Originally the album was planned to be titled Mirror Image, pointing out Cher's known brave side and her newly found 'wild disco' side. Since Cher was not really into the album (she wanted to "rock out"), she kept on refusing songs on one hand and adding songs on the other hand. "Boys & Girls", a more rock-based song was added by Cher. Since there was nothing left from the album's original plan, the title was changed into Prisoner before release.

Prisoner has been released on CD together with the first Casablanca Records album Take Me Home on a CD titled The Casablanca Years. This CD unites all the tracks from both albums, merging them onto one single CD.

== Promotion ==
Cher recorded an exclusive TV special called Cher...and Other Fantasies, featuring sketches, the unreleased tracks "Like a Number", a new version of "More than You Know" and the song "Ain't Nobody's Business" which was performed in the Take Me Home Tour.

== Singles ==
"Hell on Wheels", the lead single from the album reached only number fifty-nine on the Billboard Hot 100. To promote the single a video was filmed. In it, Cher was featured wearing roller skates being followed by some truckers. The song was also included in the original soundtrack to the film, Roller Boogie.

"Holdin' Out for Love" was released in Japan as a promotional single, and in the UK as a commercial 7", which failed to chart.

== Critical reception ==
Professional ratings
Review scores
Source	Rating
AllMusic	1/5 stars
The Encyclopedia of Popular Music	2/5 stars

The Los Angeles Times deemed Prisoner Cher's "most interesting album yet", writing that "the direction is rock-ish rather than hard-core disco". The Modesto Bee labeled it "danceable—but not particularly memorable—rock 'n' roll". Cash Box considered the album "a tasty confection of MOR disco, softcore pop and a toot or two of big band", and that "Cher's mannish vocal style dominates all tracks", a style described as "well suited for the album's 'get tough' lyrics". Record World wrote that Cher "turned down the disco beats" of her previous work, but emphasized that "you can still dance to this new collection", describing it as "a crafty package for several radio formats" driven by her "always strong rock vocals".

== Track listing ==
Side one
No.	Title	Writer(s)	Length
1.	"Prisoner"	David Paich	5:50
2.	"Holdin' Out for Love"	Tom Snow; Cynthia Weil	4:23
3.	"Shoppin'"	Bob Esty; Michelle Aller	4:30
4.	"Boys and Girls"	Billy Falcon	3:54

Side two
No.	Title	Writer(s)	Length
1.	"Mirror Image"	Esty; Michael Brooks	4:52
2.	"Hell on Wheels"	Esty; Aller	5:38
3.	"Holy Smoke!"	Esty; Aller	4:56
4.	"Outrageous"	Esty; Aller	3:10

== Personnel ==
- Cher – main vocals
- Michelle Aller, Arnold McCuller, Luther Vandross, Ginger Blake, Laura Creamer, Linda Dillard – background vocals
- Richard Tee – Hammond B3 organ
- Jeff Porcaro, Alvin Taylor, Rick Shlosser, Mike Baird – drums
- Kim Hutchcroft – flute, saxophone
- Gary Herbig – saxophone
- Bill Reichenbach Jr. – trombone
- John Pierce – bass guitar
- David Williams, Robby Krieger, Steve Lukather, Ira Newborn, Joey Brasler – guitar
- Tom Snow – keyboards
- David Paich – piano
- John Hobbs – piano, Hammond organ
- Dan Wyman – synthesizer, programming
- Bob Esty – piano, synthesizer, background vocals, string arrangements
- Victor Feldman – timpani, tambourine
- Paulinho Da Costa, Larry Emerine, Alan Estes, Oliver C. Brown – percussion
- Jerry Hey – horn arrangements
- Sid Sharp – concertmaster

Technical

- Larry Emerine – co-producer, engineer
- Harry Langdon – photography
