= Lulu Porter =

American actress and singer (born 1940)

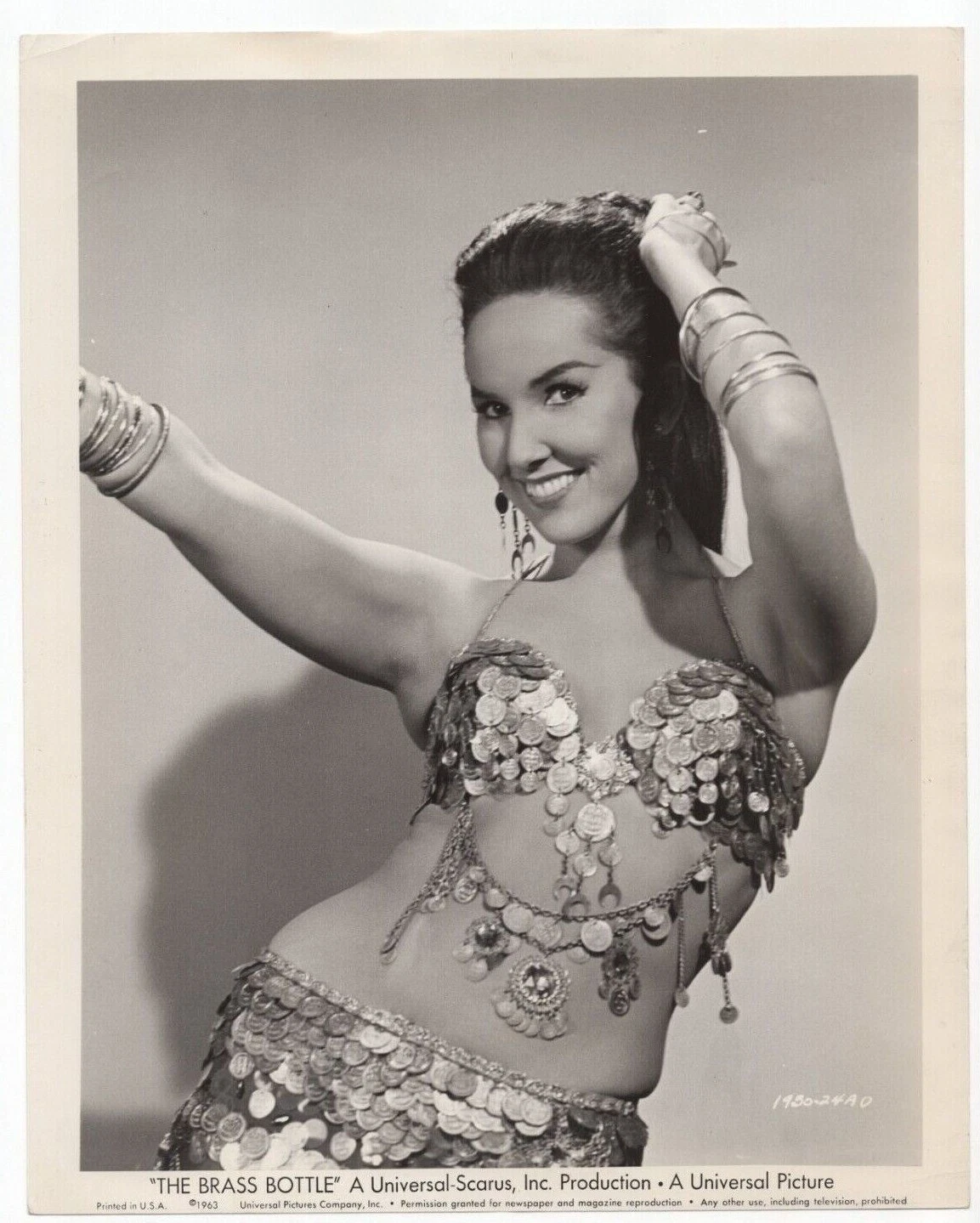
Porter, c. 1963

Lulu Porter (born Marianne Wolford; July 28, 1940, Youngstown, Ohio) is a retired American singer and actress who performed in the 1960s. She came from a large Ohio family, with nine siblings: Monica Eva, Straucy Marguerite, French Garl, Dalton Harold, Ruhl Carter, Wanda Bessie, Merrill Wilton, and Edith Carroll Wolford. Her parents were Ada Glenna “Adie” Stout and Absalom B. “Abb” Wolford.

Her film credits include The Brass Bottle (1964), Hollywood a Go Go (1964), Branded (1965) and Bob Mackie: The Naked Illusion (uncredited, 2024).

Her musical discography includes The Brass Bottle (1964), Nobody Hurt But Me (1965), I Gotta Be With You (1966), Mr. Music Man (1966) and The Malibu Seal II (date unavailable).

== Career ==
Her big break came when she was singing at a small night club in Beverly Hills called Ye Little Club. One night, after finishing her 25-minute act of nine songs with a three-piece combo, she was congratulated by Pierre Salinger (President John F. Kennedy's press secretary), who was accompanied by Patricia Kennedy Lawford and Patricia (Pat) Newcomb, Marilyn Monroe's last publicist.

From that contact, she represented the United States at the Third International Music Festival, singing with a symphony orchestra one day and with a large jazz band the next in Poland, for which she received a special award.

== Personal life ==
Lulu stated in an interview for the New York Times that she had been born in Youngstown, Ohio, and had settled in Los Angeles around 1955. She married the designer Bob Mackie March 14, 1960 and divorced in 1963. They shared a son. On March 8, 1964, she married her manager Jerry Fonarow in Las Vegas, Nevada. Her third marriage was to Blaine Bobo Nicholson on October 31, 1968, remaining with him until his death in 2017.

Her son with Bob Mackie was Robin Gordon Mackie, who later became a makeup artist. Robin died in 1993 from complications related to AIDS. She has a granddaughter and two great‑granddaughters through Robin.
