= Take Me Home (Cher album) =

Studio album by Cher
- Released: January 25, 1979
- Recorded: 1978
- Genres: Disco; pop
- Length: 38:03
- Label: Casablanca
- Producers: Bob Esty; Ron Dante

Cher chronology
Two the Hard Way (1977)	Take Me Home (1979)	Prisoner (1979)

Singles from Take Me Home
- 1. "Take Me Home" Released: January 29, 1979; 2. "Wasn't It Good" Released: May 14, 1979; 3. "It's Too Late to Love Me Now" Released: May 21, 1979

Take Me Home is the fifteenth studio album by American singer-actress Cher, released on January 25, 1979, on Casablanca Records. After her last three studio albums sold poorly, Cher made a brief commercial comeback with Take Me Home. The album reached number 25 on the US Billboard Top LPs chart. The RIAA certified it gold on May 17 of that year for the sales of 500,000 copies in the US.

== Album information ==
Take Me Home was Cher's first album of 1979, and also her first released by Casablanca Records. It was produced by Bob Esty and Ron Dante, and most of the songs were written by Michele Aller and Bob Esty. This marked the beginning of her brief venture into disco music. Much to Cher's chagrin, she was pressured into recording an album of this genre. From the album came a major comeback hit, "Take Me Home". She contributed a lyrically self-penned song about her failed marriage to Gregg Allman on the closing ballad, "My Song (Too Far Gone)". This album is dedicated to "Butterfly".

Commercially, the album debuted at number 75 on the Billboard 200 on the issue date of February 10, 1979, reaching its peak position, 25, on May 12. The success of the title track boosted sales of the album and the album is also known for its cover photograph of a scantily-clad Cher in a gold, Bob Mackie-designed Viking outfit that received a lot of attention at the time. Take Me Home was also the first album to have three tracks mixed: "Take Me Home" (12" Mix), "Wasn't It Good" (12" Mix) and "Git Down (Guitar Groupie)" (12" Mix) available on the "Hell on Wheels" single. Gene Simmons, her boyfriend at the time, received a credit on the album owing to his presence on the track "Git Down (Guitar Groupie)".

Take Me Home has been released on CD together with her second Casablanca Records album, Prisoner, numerous times on a CD titled The Casablanca Years. This CD unites all the tracks from both albums, merging them onto one single CD. The album was released in 1993 and re-released in 1996 with a different cover. Unreleased songs from the sessions include "Oh God America", "Sometime Somewhere" both written by Cher but she did not like her contributions so they were left off the album. The Ron Dante-produced "If He'd Take Me Back Again" was also recorded during the Take Me Home sessions and remains unreleased.

== Promotion ==
To promote the album, Cher recorded a music video for "Take Me Home" which was used as part of an exclusive TV special called Cher... and Other Fantasies. She also performed "Take Me Home" along with other two album tracks "Love & Pain" and "Happy Was the Day We Met" on The Mike Douglas Show. In 1979 Cher embarked on her first solo tour, the Take Me Home Tour, which was highly successful with two dates of the show recorded for broadcast, in Monte Carlo and at Caesars Palace in Las Vegas. For the latter performance, Cher was awarded "Best Actress in a Variety Program" at the 1983 CableACE Awards.

== Critical reception ==
Professional ratings
Review scores
Source	Rating
AllMusic	2/5 stars
Smash Hits	4/10

The Oakland Post wrote that "the range of her mastery is astounding... From the pop-disco extravaganza that is the title tune to the achingly personal 'My Song (Too Far Gone)'." Cash Box gave a positive review to the album, describing side one as a "devoted strictly to disco tunes, highlighted by the feisty title track," and Cher's vocal performances throughout the album as "aggressive, fluid, and more expressive than most of her recent recordings." Billboard recommended the album and considered "Love & Pain", "Take Me Home", "My Song", "Wasn't It Good" and "Git Down (Guitar Groupie)" the best cuts.

== Track listing ==
All tracks produced by Bob Esty except "Love & Pain (Pain in My Heart)" and "It's Too Late to Love Me Now" by Ron Dante.

Side one
No.	Title	Writer(s)	Length
1.	"Take Me Home"	Michele Aller; Esty	6:45
2.	"Wasn't It Good"	Aller; Esty	4:20
3.	"Say the Word"	Aller; Esty	4:59
4.	"Happy Was the Day We Met"	Peppi Castro	4:00

Side two
No.	Title	Writer(s)	Length
1.	"Git Down (Guitar Groupie)"	Aller; Esty	3:44
2.	"Pain in My Heart"	Richard T. Bear	3:25
3.	"Let This Be a Lesson to You"	Tom Snow	3:17
4.	"It's Too Late to Love Me Now"	Rory Bourke; Gene Dobbins; Johnny Wilson	3:39
5.	"My Song (Too Far Gone)"	Cher; Brett Hudson; Mark Hudson	3:54

== Personnel ==
- Cher – lead vocals
- Jay Graydon – guitar
- Steve Lukather – guitar on "Git Down (Guitar Groupie)"
- Jeff Porcaro – drums on "Git Down (Guitar Groupie)"
- David Hungate – bass on "Git Down (Guitar Groupie)"
- Gene Simmons – backing vocals on "Git Down (Guitar Groupie)"
- Bob Esty – record producer
- Ron Dante – record producer
- Larry Emerine – sound engineer
- Richard Bowls – sound engineer
- Janice Soled – project coordinator
- Wayne Olsen – compilation producer
- Barry Levine – photography

== Charts ==
Weekly chart performance for Take Me Home
Chart (1979)	Peak position
Canada Top Albums/CDs (RPM)	24
Canada Dance/Urban (RPM)	9
US Billboard 200	25
US Billboard Top R&B Albums	32
US Cash Box Top 100 Albums	28
US Cash Box Black Contemporary Top 75 Albums	38
US Record World Top 100 LP's	42
US Record World Black Oriented Albums	39

== Certifications ==
Certifications for Take Me Home
Region	Certification	Certified units/sales
United States (RIAA)	Gold	500,000^{^}
^{^} Shipments figures based on certification alone.
