= Hell on Wheels (song) =

- Netherlands 7" single cover

Single by Cher

from the album Prisoner
- B-side: "Hell On Wheels (Mono)"; "Git Down (Guitar Groupie) (12" Version)"
- Released: August 1979
- Recorded: 1979
- Genre: Disco; pop rock; new wave
- Length: 5:38
- Label: Casablanca Records; Philips Records
- Songwriters: Bob Esty; Michele Aller
- Producer: Bob Esty

Cher singles chronology
"It's Too Late (To Love Me Now)" (1979)	"Hell on Wheels" (1979)	"Holdin' Out for Love" (1979)

Music video
- "Hell On Wheels" on YouTube

"Hell on Wheels" is a disco song performed by American singer-actress Cher from her sixteenth studio album, Prisoner. It was written by Bob Esty and Michele Aller and produced by Esty. It was released as the album's first and only international single in August of 1979. Lyrically, the track is about "follow what you like".

Cher starred in a short film that Casablanca Records wanted to promote her single with. After releasing the promotional film, Cher began making music videos.

== Background ==
According to J. Randy Taraborrelli 's biography, "Hell on Wheels" was recorded because Cher admitted to being a roller-skating fanatic. The single was released with "Git Down (Guitar Groupie)", a song from the album Take Me Home on its B-side. Both songs were released as a 12" extended version and both versions are not yet released on CD.

In 1979, "Hell on Wheels" was included in original motion picture soundtrack to the film Roller Boogie as the track number one. After the released of the soundtrack album, "Hell on Wheels" was released in Japan with a different artwork, featuring a photo of Cher bottom center, taken from the After Dark magazine, and with a still of Linda Blair and Jim Bray. The song was released with "Git Down (Guitar Groupie)" on its B-side. Strangely "Git Down (Guitar Groupie)" in the Japanese single was a "Theme from Roller Boogie", despite the song never appeared in the movie or in the soundtrack album.

== Critical reception ==
"Hell on Wheels"
Los Angeles Times said that the song "latches onto the roller-skating craze as tenaciously-and stylishly-as the Beach Boys latched onto surfing."

"Hell on Wheels" initially received mixed reviews from critics. The review of the Los Angeles Times newspaper describes the song as the best cut of the album and noted "'Hell on Wheels', latches onto the roller-skating craze as tenaciously-and stylishly-as the Beach Boys latched onto surfing. Joel Flegler of the Fanfare Magazine, while reviewing the Roller Boogie soundtrack gave a negative review for all the songs, using the word 'worse' in reference to the length of the album. Another critic said that every song of the album had the same rock influence, and about the song said that was "her trendy roller-disco effort".. However, in 1999, Randy Cordova from The Arizona Republic praised the song, calling it a "roller-disco anthem".

== Commercial performance ==
Despite a worldwide commercial release, "Hell on Wheels" did not manage to achieve any success other than in the United States, where it had a moderate performance on the Billboard Hot 100 and Cash Box Top 100 charts. It debuted at number 81 on September 15, 1979, peaking its highest position (59) on October 13. "Hell On Wheels" was also her last hit for Casablanca Records.

== Music video ==
The video for "Hell on Wheels" was tough for Cher to shoot. She was required to skate down steep, mountainous roads while sporting a broken arm. In the video, Cher is roller skating and being followed by a huge truck driven by two men which use the maximum speed of the truck to catch up with her. Following this, Cher convinces many people with different types of transportation to follow and take a ride with her.

"Hell on Wheels" was Cher's first professional video. Some consider "Take Me Home" to be her first professional clip, though this was lifted from her highly rated 1979 TV special Cher...and Other Fantasies. "Hell on Wheels" is one of the 1970s pioneer music videos to be produced in the MTV style before MTV itself existed, and now it is considered to be one of the first modern music videos.

The video was premiered on the late night NBC television show The Midnight Special. Promotional clips were also shown during a 1979 interview with Phil Donahue on The Phil Donahue Show. Despite "Hell on Wheels" being her first official music video, it was never released on The Very Best of Cher: The Video Hits Collection.

== In popular culture ==
Considered a roller disco anthem, "Hell On Wheels" has appeared on movies and commercials. In 1979, the song was featured on the Roller Boogie soundtrack, used in the opening sequence. In 2019, the song was the theme song for Michael Kors' Fall campaign ad with Bella Hadid and Mayowa Nicholas.

== Personnel ==
- Cher – main vocals
- Michelle Aller – background vocals
- Richard Tee – Hammond B3 organ
- Mike Baird – drums
- John Pierce – bass guitar
- Steve Lukather, Ira Newborn – guitar
- Dan Wyman – synthesizer, programming
- Bob Esty – piano, synthesizer, background vocals
- Alan Estes, Oliver C. Brown – percussion
- Sid Sharp – concertmaster

Technical

- Larry Emerine – co-producer, engineer
- Harry Langdon – photography

== Charts ==
Chart (1979)	Peak position
US Billboard Hot 100	59
US Cash Box Top 100	64
