= Harry Langdon Jr. =

American photographer (born 1934)

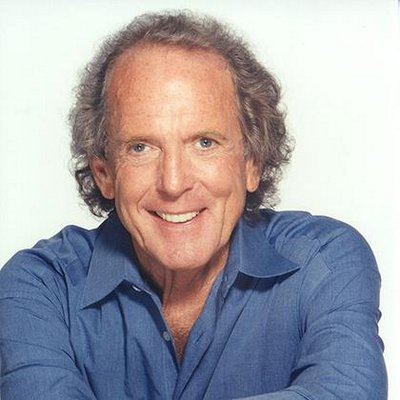
Harry Langdon Jr.

Harry Philmore Langdon Jr. (born December 16, 1934) (Note: One source provides December 17 as his birth date.) is an American celebrity photographer. Born in Hollywood, Los Angeles, his father was the silent film actor Harry Langdon, who died when he was 10 years old. Harry Langdon Jr. eventually built a successful career as a portrait photographer of Hollywood stars with his own photographic studio in Beverly Hills. His celebrity clients have included such figures as Dolly Parton, Joan Rivers, and Angelina Jolie. Langdon's photos of Cher appeared on the cover art for her releases Prisoner, I Paralyze, and "Hell on Wheels"; and his photo of Diana Ross appeared as the cover art for her self-titled 1970 album.

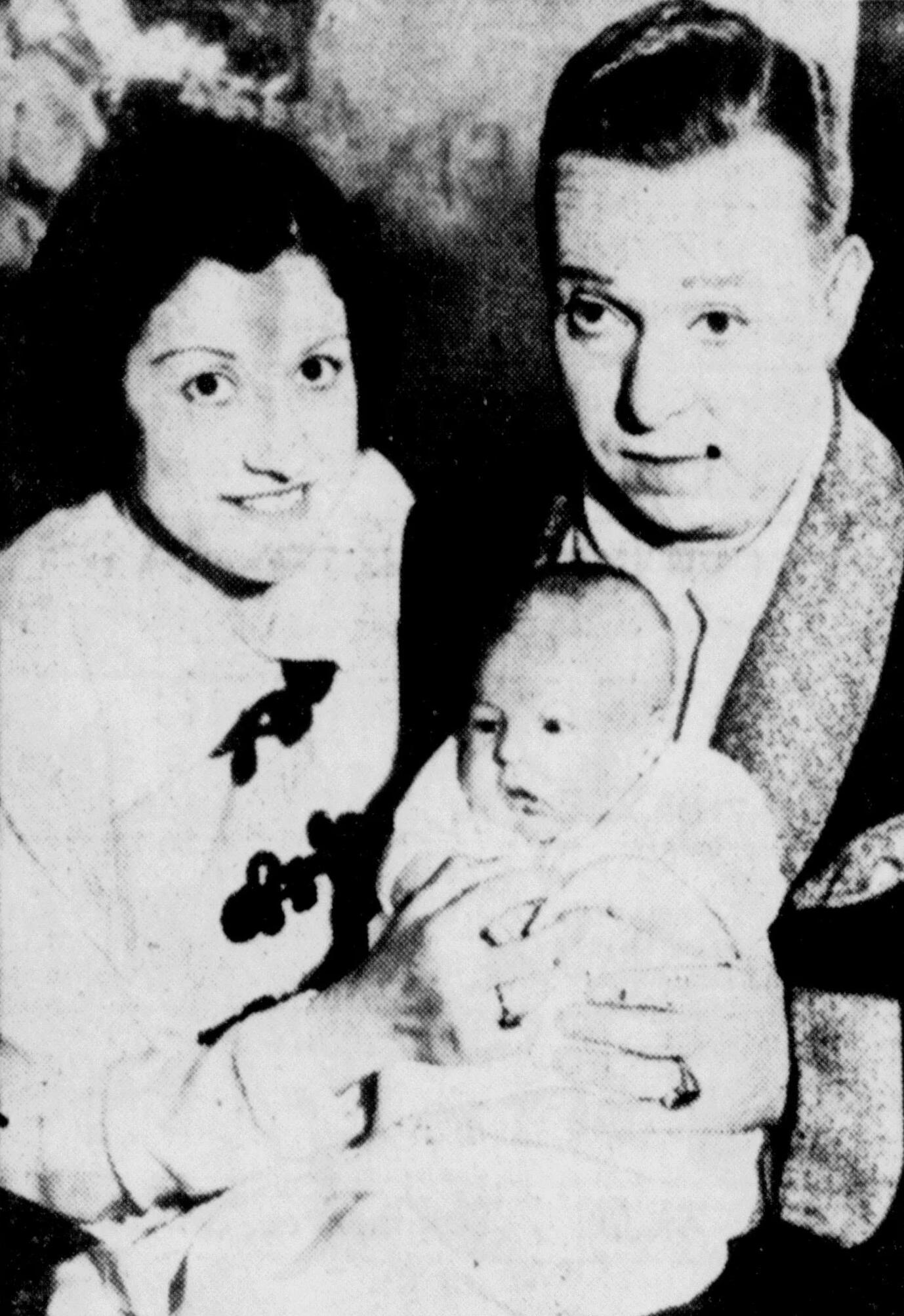
Harry Langdon Jr. with his parents Harry and Mabel, 1935

Selected photos by Langdon

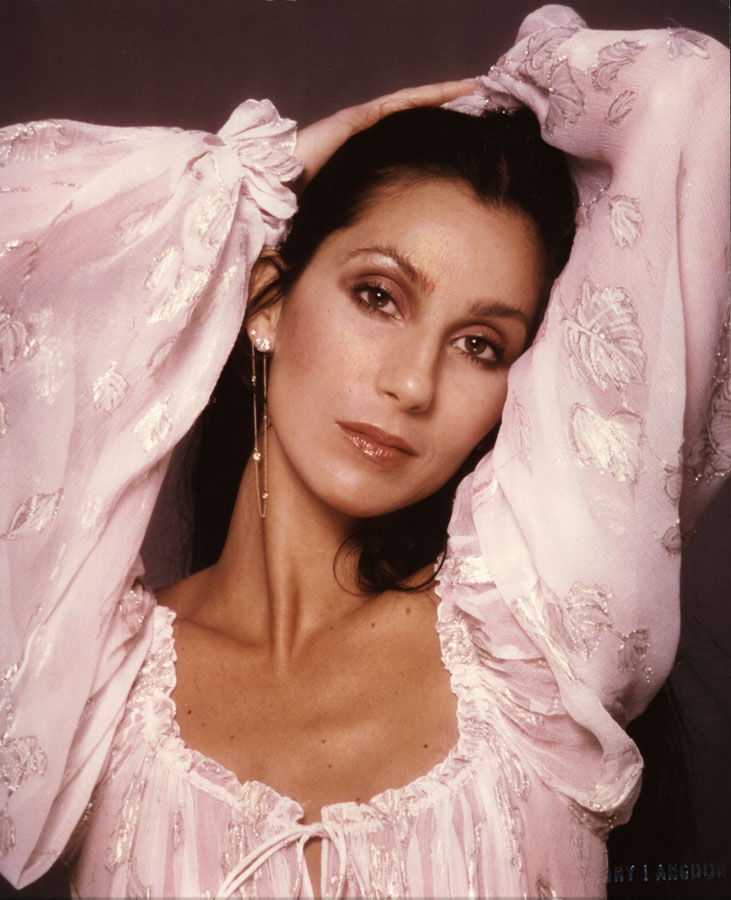
Cher, 1978

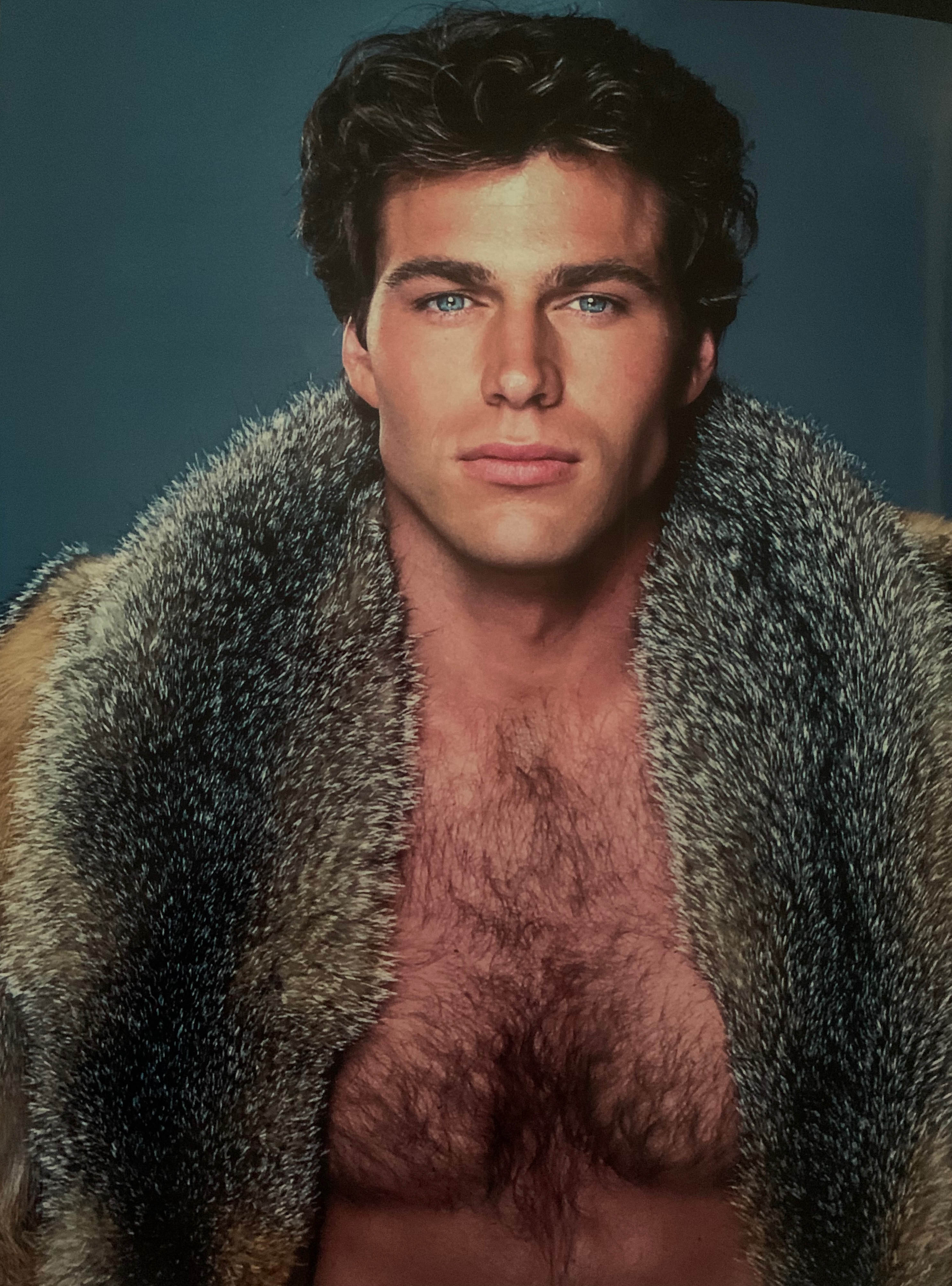
Jon-Erik Hexum, 1983

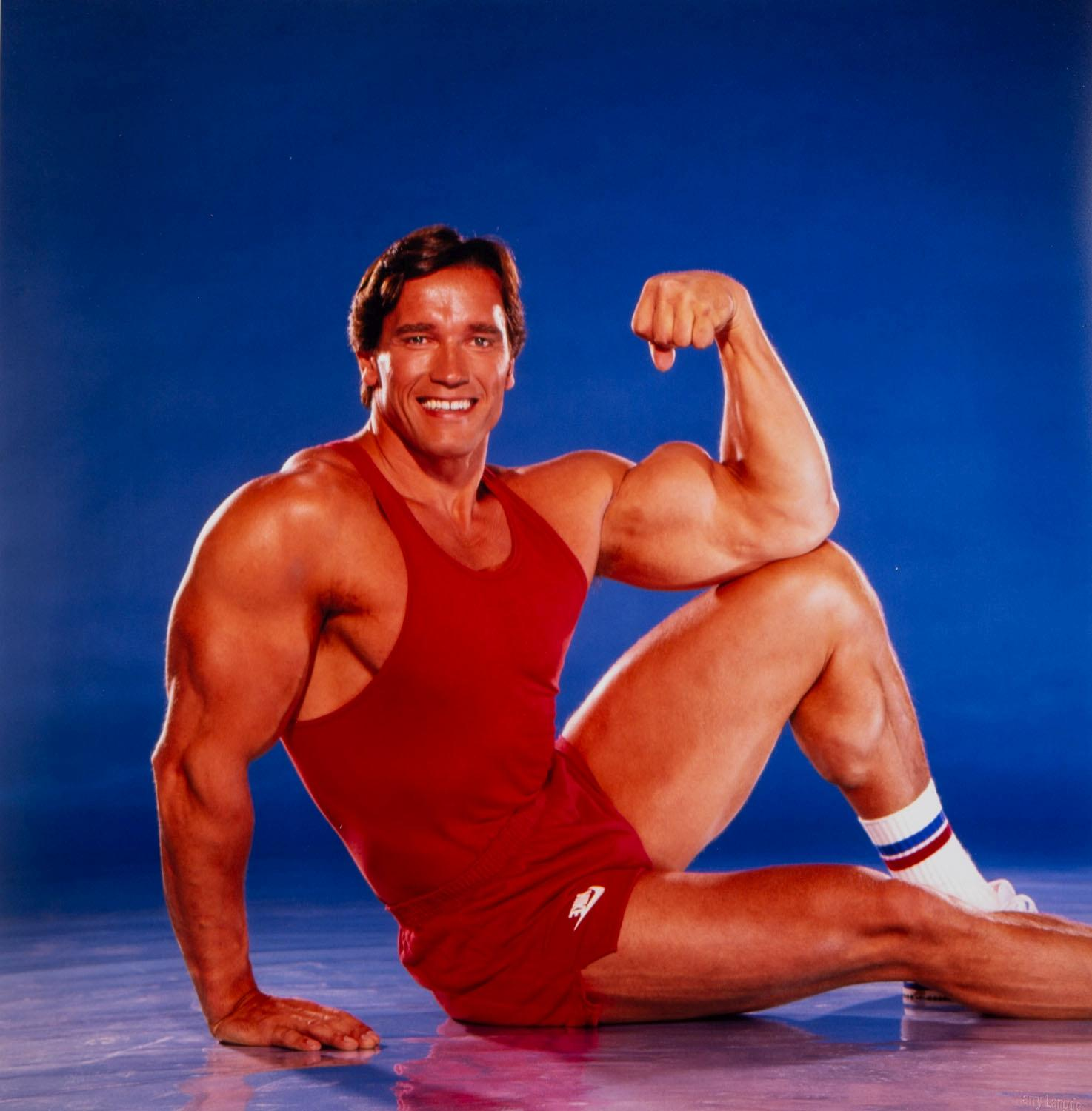
Arnold Schwarzenegger, 1985

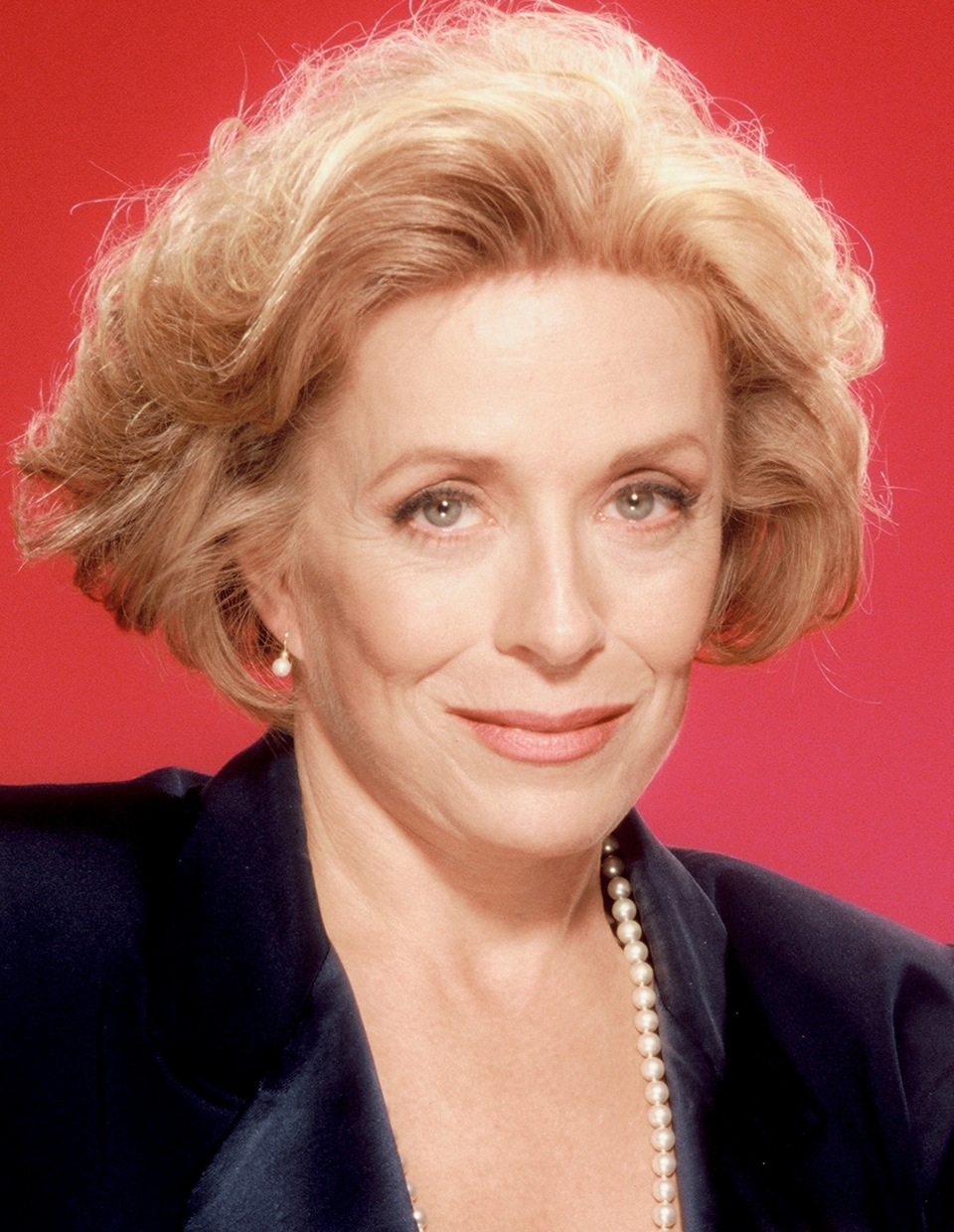
Holland Taylor, c. 1994

== Books ==
- Harry Langdon's HOLLYWOOD. Blurb, Incorporated. 2018. ISBN 978-0-368-05771-7.
- Nothing On A Stage Is Permanent: The Harry Langdon Scrapbook. BearManor Media. 2022. ISBN 979-8-88771-014-3.
- Photographic Art of Donna Summer - The Creation of Her Music Album Covers. BearManor Media. 2024. ISBN 979-8-88771-554-4.
