= Holdin' Out for Love =

Single by Cher

from the album Prisoner
- B-side: "Outrageous" (UK); "Boys and Girls" (Japan)
- Released: 1979
- Recorded: 1979
- Genre: Disco, pop
- Length: 4:23
- Label: Casablanca
- Songwriters: Tom Snow, Cynthia Weil
- Producer: Bob Esty

Cher singles chronology
"Hell on Wheels" (1979)	"Holdin' Out for Love" (1979)	"Dead Ringer for Love" (1981)

Audio
- "Holdin' Out for Love" by Cher on YouTube

"Holdin' Out for Love" is a song introduced by American singer-actress Cher from her sixteenth studio album, Prisoner: written by Tom Snow and lyricist Cynthia Weil, the song has subsequently been recorded by the Pointer Sisters and Angela Bofill.

"Holdin' Out..." was the first songwriting collaboration between Tom Snow and lyricist Cynthia Weil: Weil and her husband Barry Mann, who formed the iconic Mann/ Weil songwriting team, had attended the BMI Awards banquet where Snow had been an honoree for writing the song "You", and Snow would recall: "I did something I'm not prone to doing because I'm not a real self-promoter. I 'ginned-up' the courage, went over and introduced myself." After checking out Snow's output and being favorably impressed, Weil had agreed to collaborate with him, the inaugural Snow/ Weil composition "Holdin' Out for Love" being recorded by Cher for her 1979 album Prisoner, her second and final album for Casablanca Records: the track was released as a promo single in late 1979 in North America (only as a DJ promo), Europe and Japan. Because of the lack of promotion by the label, it failed to the chart and was largely ignored commercially.

In 1995, UK budget label Tring International reissued the Prisoner album by Cher in CD format under the title Holdin' Out for Love; however after PolyGram - the parent label of the then-defunct Casablanca Records - sued alleging that the Tring release was unauthorized, Tring admitted that the purported licensor of the album tracks had acted without authority, with Tring agreeing to cease marketing of the Holdin' Out for Love CD and to destroy all remaining stock.

The song was recorded in 1981 by the Pointer Sisters who had recently had a top ten hit with the Snow/Weil composition "He's So Shy"; however the Pointers' version of "Holdin' Out..." was relegated to the B-side of the group's single "Slow Hand" and was not included on the group's 1981 album Black & White. "Holdin' Out..." was later featured as a bonus track on the 2009 remastered CD release of Black & White.

"Holdin' Out..." had its highest profile in 1982 when the version recorded by Angela Bofill for her album Something About You reached #25 on the R&B chart.

== Official versions (Cher) ==
- Main Version - 4:23
- Promo Radio Edit - 3:06
- 7" Version - 5:51
