= Two the Hard Way Tour =

1977 concert tour by Cher and Gregg Allman

- Tour by Cher and Gregg Allman
- Poster to the concerts in Germany
- Associated album: Two the Hard Way
- Start date: June 29, 1977
- End date: December 10, 1977
- Legs: 3
- No. of shows: 22

Cher concert chronology
- The Sonny & Cher Show Tour (1977); Two the Hard Way Tour (1977); Take Me Home Tour (1979–82)

The Two the Hard Way Tour (also known as the Allman and Woman Tour) was a concert tour by the American singer-actress Cher and the American singer Gregg Allman, designed to promote their joint Two the Hard Way album. Because of the album's commercial failure, the dates of the tour in the United States were very limited, although there were more dates in Japan, Oceania and Europe.

== History ==
At the time of the tour, Cher had just finished production of The Sonny & Cher Show after a broken six-year run. Allman's band, The Allman Brothers Band, was in the middle of an acrimonious break up.

The European leg of the tour covered the Netherlands, Belgium, France, UK and West Germany, over a period of 29 days. The tour started on November 6, 1977, and was to be a 29 date tour, but on December 3, 1977, Cher left the tour and left Allman in Europe while she returned to the United States with her children. Two nights in Sydney, Melbourne, Brisbane, Adelaide and Perth were planned but never went through.

The pair were backed by an eight-piece band. The show, whose material was selected by both of them, combined Allman's material, which he sang solo, and numerous duets between the two on softer material in a blues or country and western vein. Cher avoided the gaudy, over-the-top outfits of her normal stage self, and instead wore jeans, a tank top and a cowboy hat. They also engaged in some married-couple stage banter, although not to the Sonny and Cher level.

In November 1977, following their opening show in Brussels, Belgium, Allman said that he had had some concerns about the endeavor. "It's the first time ever we've given concerts together. We wondered a lot about how it would work out. For one thing, we didn't know if we'd be accepted." Cher said, "It's different, but not that different, and I also find it real easy to sing this type of music," sentiments she had said before the tour as well. "We sound like we've been singing together for a long time."

Allman did not want this tour's road expenses to mount up, as they had for the last Allman Brothers Band tour. However, this tour too lost money from the start. The Hard Way Tour also led to the final break up of the couple. While pre-tour publicity had emphasized that Allman was free from drug and alcohol problems, Cher discovered during it that his drinking had returned and, once the tour was complete, she told him that their marriage was finally over.

== Partial set list ==
The set list included:

1. "Matthew's Arrival"
2. "Trouble No More"
3. "Don't Keep Me Wonderin'"
4. "Queen of Hearts"
5. "Let This Be a Lesson to Ya"
6. "Sweet Feelin'"
7. "One More Try"
8. "Oncoming Traffic"
9. "Come and Go Blues"
10. "Bring It On Back"
11. "Leave My Blues at Home"
12. "Whipping Post"
13. "Move Me" (with Cher)
14. "Do What You Gotta Do" (with Cher)
15. "Midnight Rider"

Also included in the set list at various stages of the tour:

- "You've Really Got a Hold on Me" (with Cher)
- "Love the One You're With" (with Cher)
- "Love Me" (with Cher)
- "Half-Breed" (Acoustic Version) Cher solo (with Allman at the guitar)

== Tour dates ==
Date	City	Country	Venue	Opening act(s)
Asia
June 29, 1977	Tokyo	Japan	Nippon Budokan	—N/a
June 30, 1977	Nagoya	Japan	Nagoya-shi Koukaidou	—N/a
July 1, 1977	Osaka	Japan	Osaka Kousei Nenkin Kaikan	—N/a
July 5, 1977	Osaka	Japan	Osaka Kousei Nenkin Kaikan	—N/a
July 6, 1977	Osaka	Japan	Osaka Kousei Nenkin Kaikan	—N/a
July 7, 1977	Kyoto	Japan	Kyoto Kaikan	—N/a
July 8, 1977	Tokyo	Japan	NHK 101 Studio	—N/a
Europe
November 6, 1977	Rotterdam	Netherlands	De Doelen	—N/a
November 9, 1977	Brussels	Belgium	Theatre 140	—N/a
November 11, 1977	Paris	France	Théâtre des Champs-Élysées	Splinter
November 14, 1977	Liverpool	United Kingdom	Liverpool Empire Theatre	—N/a
November 17, 1977	Cardiff	United Kingdom	Cardiff University	Splinter
November 19, 1977	Birmingham	United Kingdom	Birmingham Hippodrome	Splinter
November 20, 1977	Glasgow	United Kingdom	The Apollo	Splinter
November 22, 1977	Manchester	United Kingdom	Manchester Apollo	Splinter
November 24, 1977	London	United Kingdom	Rainbow	Splinter
November 28, 1977	Berlin	Germany	Hochschule der Künste	Splinter
November 29, 1977	Hamburg	Germany	Musikhalle	Splinter
November 30, 1977	Frankfurt	Germany	Stadthalle Offenbach	Splinter
December 3, 1977	Düsseldorf	Germany	Philipshalle	Splinter
December 4, 1977	Cologne	Germany	Messehalle 8	Splinter
North America
December 10, 1977	Lowell	United States	Lowell Memorial Auditorium	—N/a

== Cancelled shows ==
Date	City	Country	Venue
July 10, 1977	Sydney	Australia	Hordern Pavilion

== Personnel ==
- Gregg Allman – organ and vocals
- Cher – vocals
- Neil Larsen – piano
- Ricky Hirsch – guitar
- John Hug – guitar
- Kenny Burke – bass guitar
- Bill Stewart – drums
- Gene Dinwiddie – saxophone

== Broadcasts and recordings ==
Concerts were only recorded in Oceania and Japan. Video or photographic records of these concerts are very hard to come by, but in early 2008, three low quality videos emerged on YouTube from the Japanese concerts. Cher is in only one video, but in Japan she also sings "You've Really Got a Hold On Me".

The couple were guests on the UK television show The Old Grey Whistle Test in 1977 to promote the album and tour, clips of which can be seen in the documentaries Still Cher and A&E Biography. In October 2021, Cher released high quality videos of several live performances from The Old Grey Whistle Test on her YouTube channel.
