= Bob Mackie =

American fashion designer (1939–2026)

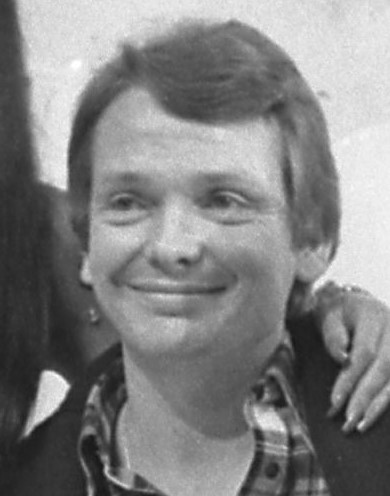
- Mackie in 1975
- Born: Robert Gordon Mackie; March 24, 1939; Monterey Park, California, U.S.
- Died: September 14, 2026 (aged 87); Palm Springs, California, U.S.
- Education: Pasadena City College; Chouinard Art Institute
- Occupations: Fashion designer, costumier
- Spouse: Lulu Porter (m. 1960; div. 1963)
- Partner: Ray Aghayan (1963–2011; his death)
- Children: 1
- Website: www.bobmackie.com

Robert Gordon Mackie (March 24, 1939 – September 14, 2026) was an American fashion designer and costumier, best known for his dressing of numerous entertainment personalities for television, movies, concerts, and live stage shows. He was the costume designer for The Carol Burnett Show (1967–78), and the creator of memorable ensembles for Cher, Tina Turner, Dolly Parton, Elton John, and Sabrina Carpenter.

Mackie is referred to alliteratively as the "Sultan of Sequins", the "Rajah of Rhinestones" or the "Guru of Glitter" for his sparkling and imaginative designs. Mackie said, "A woman who wears my clothes is not afraid to be noticed." Mattel partnered with him to produce outfits for collectable Barbie dolls, and he introduced cultural diversity to their features and outfits to reflect the heritage of real-life women.

He received ten Emmy Awards, a Tony Award, and three nominations for the Academy Award for Best Costume Design for his work.

== Early life and education ==
Mackie was born in Monterey Park, California on March 24, 1939, to Charles Robert Mackie and Mildred Agnes (née Smith) Mackie. His father worked at Bank of America. He had an older sister. Mackie was raised in early childhood by his maternal grandparents in Alhambra, California, because his parents divorced. By high school he moved to Rosemead, California, and lived with his father. He attended Rosemead High School.

He continued his education at Pasadena City College and one-year study at Chouinard Art Institute but left without earning a degree from either school. At Chouinard, Mackie studied under Eva Roberts, the head of the fashion design department. He left Chouinard early because he got his first job sketching for Frank Thompson at Paramount Studios. Between 1960 and 1963, Mackie worked as a novice designer and assistant under designer Ray Aghayan at Paramount Studios.

== Career ==
=== 1960–1969 ===
While he was working at Paramount Studios, costumer Edith Head engaged Mackie to work on the 1963 films Donovan's Reef and A New Kind of Love. He said "Edith Head taught me not so much about designing as how to handle producers, directors, and actors. Her public relations were superb."

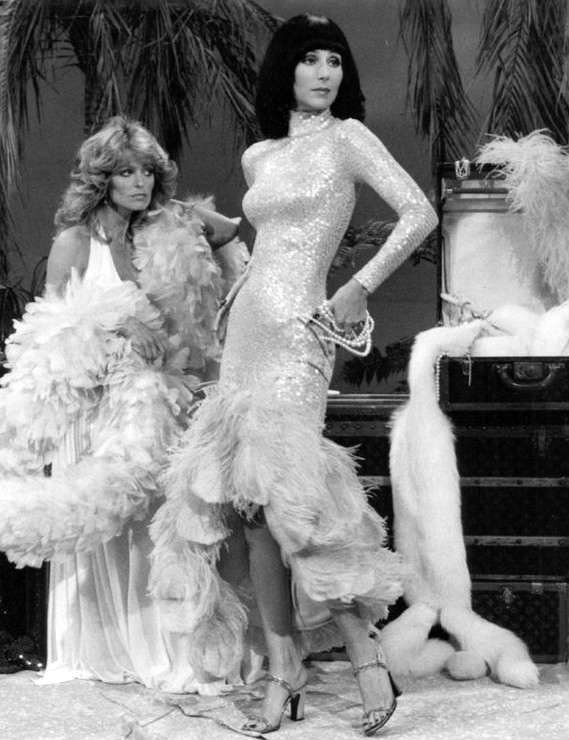
Bob Mackie designs for Cher and Farrah Fawcett on The Sonny & Cher Show (1976)

In Mackie's early career he worked as a sketch artist for French haute couturier Jean Louis, who is noted for having crafted stage gowns worn by actress Marlene Dietrich during her career as a cabaret singer. As one of his first assignments, he drew the original sketch of Marilyn Monroe's dress worn in 1962 at President John F. Kennedy's birthday celebration at Madison Square Garden in New York.

In 1966, Mackie was hired by Mitzi Gaynor to design her new stage show at the Riviera in Las Vegas. Gaynor was the first star client for whom Mackie designed an entire show. During her second network special, she wore a form-fitting "nude illusion" gown made from a knit fabric called soufflé, which has influenced gown construction worn by many entertainers throughout the years. He would continue to design for her television specials and live stage shows for the next 50 years. He won two Emmy Awards for Outstanding Achievement in Costume Design for Music-Variety for Gaynor's TV specials Mitzi...Roarin' in the Twenties (1976) and Mitzi...Zings into Spring (1977).

In 1969, Mackie was hired to design costumes for Diana Ross, the Supremes, and the Temptations in the television special G.I.T. on Broadway. In 1972, he and Aghayan were nominated for the Academy Award for Best Costume Design for Lady Sings the Blues, starring Ross. Mackie and Ross continued their collaborative efforts well into the 21st century, with Mackie designing stage costumes for Ross's 2010 More Today Than Yesterday: The Greatest Hits Tour.

=== 1970–1989 ===
Mackie designed costumes for the Las Vegas Strip-based burlesque shows Hallelujah Hollywood, which was inspired by the Ziegfeld Follies and ran at the MGM Grand (now Horseshoe Las Vegas) from 1974 to 1980, and Jubilee!, which ran from 1981 to 2016. Both productions involved intricate, elaborate costumes. Images of many of Mackie's design drawings for these productions are available for viewing online in the Donn Arden papers archive from the UNLV Libraries Digital Collections. Elton John's Donald Duck, sequined Los Angeles Dodgers, and Wolfgang Amadeus Mozart concert costumes were also designed by Mackie.

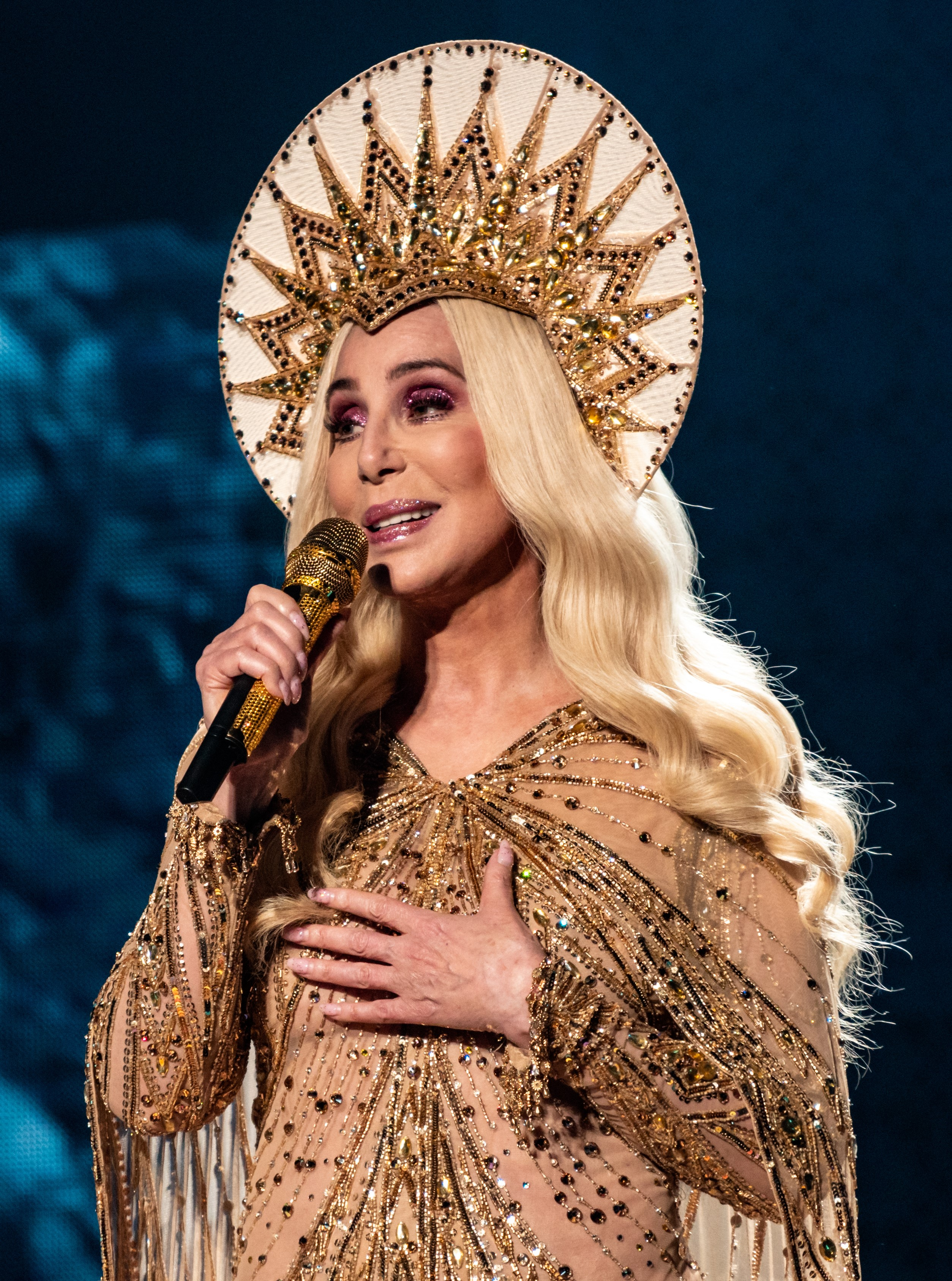
Cher wearing a Mackie outfit during her 2019 tour

He designed the exotic ensemble worn by Cher at the 58th Academy Awards in March 1986: black stretch pants, a bejeweled loincloth, knee-high boots, a black chainlink top, and a huge feathered Mohawk headdress that was one-and-a-half times taller than her head. She was introduced by Jane Fonda with the words, "Wait'll you see what's gonna come out here". "As you can see", said Cher, "I did receive my Academy booklet on how to dress like a serious actress."

Mackie designed costumes for Whitney Houston, especially splashy evening gowns which she wore for many years during concert tours and award shows. He won nine Primetime Emmy Awards for his designs, and was nominated three times for an Academy Award.

In 1981, Mackie guest-starred as himself on two episodes of the television series The Love Boat. In 2002, Mackie was inducted into the Television Academy Hall of Fame.

=== 1990–2026 ===
Mackie designed Liza Minnelli's wedding dress for her 2002 wedding to David Gest. Mackie's biographer, Frank Vlastnik described Mackie as the "Crown Prince of the Imperial Monarchy of the Island of Bling". Mackie recalled the planning for the wedding as "nuts" and that it was "absolute pandemonium" at the church. During his final years, Mackie was mainly known as the costume designer for Cher's elaborate outfits during her latest tours, including the Here We Go Again Tour. He created the costumes for Cher's 2008–11 Las Vegas Cher residency at Caesars Palace, as well as for her 2017 Classic Cher shows in Las Vegas and Washington, D.C. Mackie won the Tony Award for Best Costume Design in a Musical for his work on The Cher Show in 2019.

In 2020, Mackie's dresses were featured and worn by television hostess Vanna White over the week of April 27 in the long-running syndicated game show Wheel of Fortune as part of honoring the San Francisco Bay Area.

On January 24, 2026, the Palm Springs Art Museum honored Mackie at its Art Party 2026 Gala. In connection with the Gala, the Museum exhibited Reflections of Glamour: Bob Mackie, an exhibit featuring 5 of his gowns, and sketches of his work from the 1970s to the 2000s.

== Other ventures ==
=== The Carol Burnett Show ===
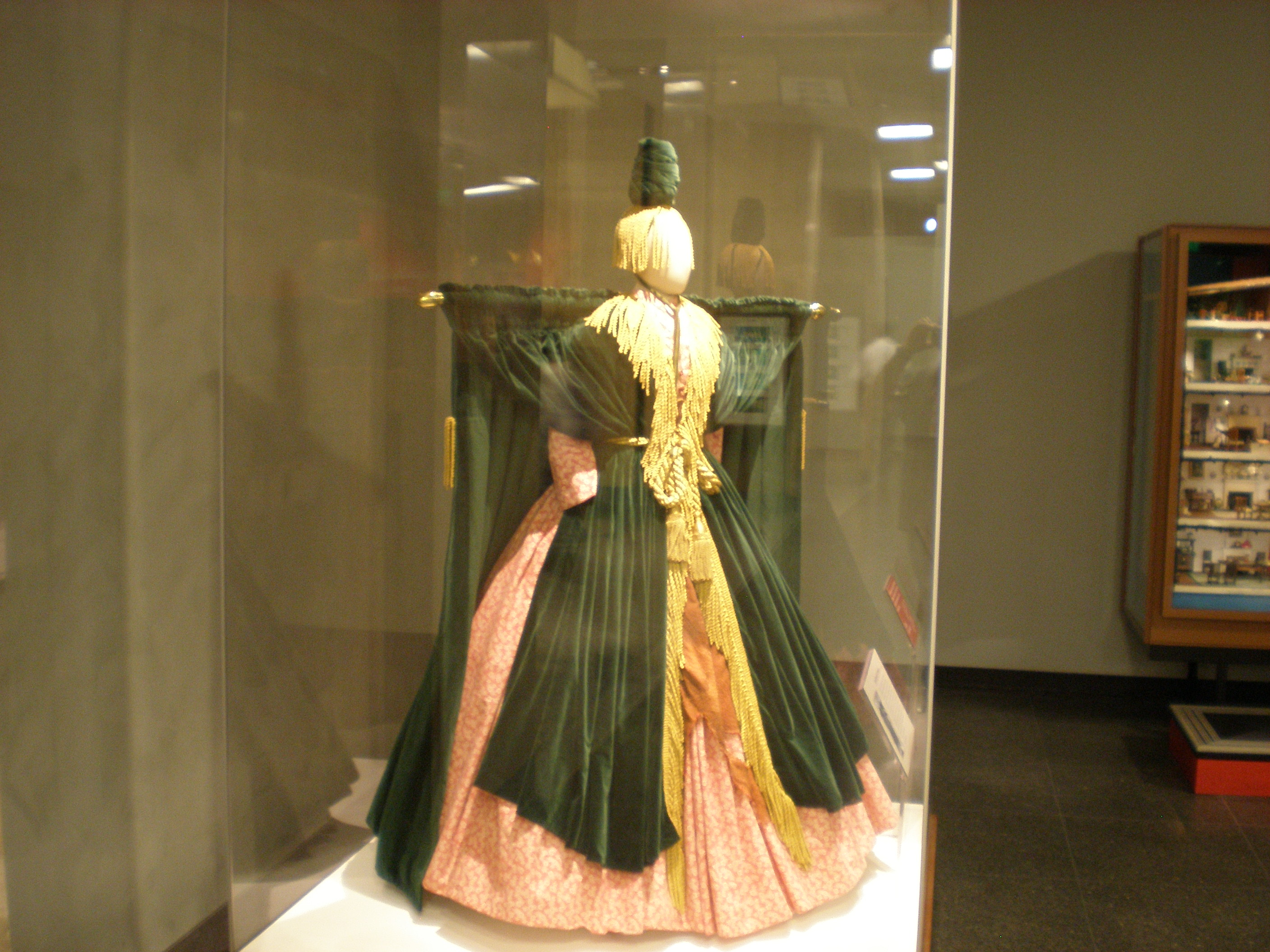
The curtain dress, worn by Carol Burnett in "Went with the Wind!" on The Carol Burnett Show, a parody of Gone with the Wind

Mackie created all of the costumes, including evening gowns, character outfits and dance clothing for guests during the run of The Carol Burnett Show, including the famous curtain dress from the "Went with the Wind!" sketch, which was donated to the Smithsonian Institution. Brent D. Glass, the museum's director, praised his creativity: "Mackie's design represents an iconic reimagining of Scarlett O'Hara's curtain dress, and it exists as a worthy reminder of the designer's unique contribution to a golden era in American comedy. It was his spirit of innovation that made 'Went with the Wind' a symbol of this country's rich comedic history."

Carol Burnett credited him with coming up with other comedic touches for the show's various characters, such as the tight-legged skirt for Mr. Tudball (Tim Conway)'s secretary, Mrs. Wanda Wiggins (Burnett). She told Mackie the skirt was too baggy in the back for her physique, but he told her to stick her bottom out to fill it, resulting in the character's distinctive posture and walk. In a 2003 interview with Terry Gross, Burnett said Mackie would put rice in the "older woman" undergarments, where typically cotton would have been used, to make the saggy breasts have weight and movement as the characters walked or danced, such as when Burnett portrayed Norma Desmond or Chiquita (Charo)'s mother. Burnett estimated that Mackie had created 17,000 outfits for the show, and said his costume work added more humor to some of the skits she felt were weaker than others. She praised him by saying "There are fashion designers, but they can't do costumes. And then there are costume designers that don't do fashion. But Bob does it all. He's the whole ball of wax."

=== Collaboration with Mattel ===
Mattel, manufacturer of Barbie dolls, approached Mackie in the late 1980s to design clothes for a Barbie. The first limited-edition doll he designed had a gold outfit with a sequined skirt, feather boa, and long ponytail, and made its debut in 1990. The doll's appearance foreshadowed a similar look taken by Madonna in concert during her Blonde Ambition World Tour.

While other designers had created fashions for Barbies, Mackie was the first to also be involved with changes to the face and hair. Mackie said at that point in time, all American dolls had blonde hair, but changing the length and color allowed Barbie to be whoever and whatever she wanted to become. A closed-mouth smile became known as the "Mackie sculpt" and was popular with collectors.

Mackie created outfits that were glamour-related or fantasy-related, instead of traditional work uniforms. Other outfits echoed his creations for television shows or specific clients like Cher. The details had to be proportionally scaled down and embroidery, beading and other details were in some cases done by hand.

Part of the innovation Mackie brought to the dolls was insisting on having different ethnicities and traditional garb represented. He drew on his experiences with the many women he worked with in fashion shows and felt the dolls should be as varied as the real women that were in the world.

=== Notable clients ===
- The Supremes
- Ann-Margret
- Lucille Ball
- Carol Burnett
- Sabrina Carpenter
- Diahann Carroll
- Carol Channing
- Miley Cyrus
- Doris Day
- Marlene Dietrich
- Barbara Eden
- Lola Falana
- Beyoncé
- Farrah Fawcett
- Cheryl Ladd
- Judy Garland
- Mitzi Gaynor
- Elton John
- Angela Lansbury
- The Lennon Sisters
- Julia Louis-Dreyfus
- Madonna
- Bette Midler
- Liza Minnelli
- The Osmonds
- Dolly Parton
- Pink
- Barbra Streisand
- Donna Summer
- Taylor Swift
- Tina Turner
- Sylvie Vartan
- Dottie West
- RuPaul
- Oprah Winfrey

== Personal life ==
=== Marriage and relationships ===
On March 14, 1960, Mackie married LuLu Porter (née Marianne Wolford), a singer and actress, and later an acting teacher. The couple divorced in 1963. They had a son, Robert Gordon Mackie Jr. (known as Robin). Robin, a makeup artist, died in 1993 at the age of 33 of an HIV/AIDS-related illness due to drug use, predeceasing his parents. Mackie and Porter remained very close throughout the years and later discovered that they shared a granddaughter, with whom they enjoyed a close relationship and two great-grandchildren.

Beginning in 1963, Mackie's significant other was costume designer Ray Aghayan, with whom Mackie worked as an assistant. The two worked together through the 1970s, as well as having separate clients. They remained together until Aghayan's death in 2011.

=== Death ===
On September 11, 2026, Mackie had fallen at a friend’s home in Palm Springs, California while recovering from pneumonia. He died from a subarachnoid hemorrhage and head trauma, three days later, on September 14 at a hospital in Palm Springs, at the age of 87.

== In popular culture ==
- Mackie is a character in the jukebox musical The Cher Show.
- Mackie appears as himself in HBO Max's Hacks season 5 episode 7, "Montecito", when Deborah Vance (Jean Smart) calls him to ask who owns his jumpsuit Carol Burnett wore in the final episode of The Carol Burnett Show.
- Mackie was awarded the inaugural Giving Us Life-time Achievement Award by RuPaul at the RuPaul's Drag Race season 15 finale.

== Awards and nominations ==
The Emmy Awards are presented as one of the United States's annual events award shows which each recognize either nationally or locally, achievements in a particular sector of the television industry. Mackie received 1 honorary award and 9 competitive awards from 32 nominations. The Tony Awards are presented annually by the American Theatre Wing and The Broadway League. Mackie received 1 award from 1 nomination.

Organizations	Year	Category	Work	Result	Ref.
Academy Awards	1973	Best Costume Design	Lady Sings the Blues	Nominated	
Academy Awards	1976	Best Costume Design	Funny Lady	Nominated	
Academy Awards	1982	Best Costume Design	Pennies from Heaven	Nominated	
Primetime Emmy Awards	1966	Outstanding Achievements in Costume Design for a Series	Wonderful World of Burlesque II	Nominated	
Primetime Emmy Awards	1967	Outstanding Achievements in Costume Design for a Series	Alice Through the Looking Glass	Won	
Primetime Emmy Awards	1969	Outstanding Individual Achievement in the Visual Arts	The Carol Burnett Show	Nominated	
Primetime Emmy Awards	1970	Outstanding Achievement in Costume Design	G.I.T. on Broadway	Won	
Primetime Emmy Awards	1972	Outstanding Achievement in Costume Design	The Sonny & Cher Comedy Hour	Nominated	
Primetime Emmy Awards	1974	Outstanding Achievement in Costume Design	The Sonny & Cher Comedy Hour	Nominated	
Primetime Emmy Awards	1975	Outstanding Achievement in Costume Design	Cher	Nominated	
Primetime Emmy Awards	1976	Outstanding Achievement in Costume Design for Music – Variety	Mitzi...Roarin' in the 20's	Won	
Primetime Emmy Awards	1976	Outstanding Achievement in Costume Design for Music – Variety	Cher	Nominated	
Primetime Emmy Awards	1977	Outstanding Achievement in Costume Design for Music – Variety	An Evening with Diana Ross	Nominated	
Primetime Emmy Awards	1977	Outstanding Achievement in Costume Design for Music – Variety	The Sonny & Cher Show	Nominated	
Primetime Emmy Awards	1978	Outstanding Achievement in Costume Design for Music – Variety	Mitzi...Zings into Spring	Won	
Primetime Emmy Awards	1979	Outstanding Costume Design for a Limited Series or Special	Cher... and Other Fantasies	Nominated	
Primetime Emmy Awards	1980	Outstanding Costume Design for a Limited Series or Special	Ann-Margret: Hollywood Movie Girls	Nominated	
Primetime Emmy Awards	1983	Outstanding Costume Design for a Series	Mama's Family	Nominated	
Primetime Emmy Awards	1984	Outstanding Costume Design for a Series	Mama's Family	Won	
Primetime Emmy Awards	1986	Outstanding Costume Design for a Variety or Music Program	Neil Diamond...Hello Again	Nominated	
Primetime Emmy Awards	1987	Outstanding Achievement for Costuming in a Series	Mama's Family	Nominated	
Primetime Emmy Awards	1987	Outstanding Achievement for Costuming in a Miniseries	Fresno	Nominated	
Primetime Emmy Awards	1988	Outstanding Individual Achievement – Special Events	The 60th Annual Academy Awards	Nominated	
Primetime Emmy Awards	1990	Outstanding Costume Design for a Variety or Music Program	Julie & Carol: Together Again	Nominated	
Primetime Emmy Awards	1991	Outstanding Costume Design for a Variety or Music Program	Cher... at the Mirage	Nominated	
Primetime Emmy Awards	1991	Outstanding Costume Design for a Variety or Music Program	Carol & Company	Won	
Primetime Emmy Awards	1992	Outstanding Achievement in Costume Design for a Variety Program	The Carol Burnett Show	Nominated	
Primetime Emmy Awards	1993	Outstanding Achievement in Costume Design for a Variety Program	The Carol Burnett Show: A Reunion	Nominated	
Primetime Emmy Awards	1994	Outstanding Costume Design for a Miniseries or Special	Gypsy	Nominated	
Primetime Emmy Awards	1995	Outstanding Achievement in Costume Design for a Variety Program	Men, Movies & Carol	Won	
Primetime Emmy Awards	1997	Outstanding Costume Design for a Miniseries or Special	Mrs. Santa Claus	Nominated	
Primetime Emmy Awards	1998	Outstanding Costumes for a Variety or Music Program	Blue Suede Shoes – Ballet Rocks!	Nominated	
Primetime Emmy Awards	2000	Outstanding Costumes for a Variety or Music Program	Cher: Live in Concert	Won	
Primetime Emmy Awards	2002	Television Hall of Fame	Himself	Honored	
Primetime Emmy Awards	2003	Outstanding Costumes for a Variety or Music Program	Cher: The Farewell Tour	Won	
Primetime Emmy Awards	2006	Outstanding Costumes for a Miniseries, Movie or a Special	Once Upon a Mattress	Nominated	
Tony Awards	2019	Best Costume Design in a Musical	The Cher Show	Won	

== Honorary awards ==
Organizations	Year	Category	Result	Ref.
Costume Designers Guild Awards	1999	Disaronno Career Achievement in Television Award	Honored	
American Choreography Awards	2001	Governor's Award	Honored	
TV Land Awards	2005	Legend Award for The Carol Burnett Show	Honored	
Council of Fashion Designers of America	2016	Geoffrey Beene Lifetime Achievement	Honored	
RuPaul's Drag Race	2023	Giving Us Life-time Achievement Award	Honored	
