= Wasn't It Good (Cher song) =

Single by Cher

from the album Take Me Home
- B-side: "It's Too Late to Love Me Now"
- Released: May 14, 1979
- Recorded: 1978
- Genre: Disco
- Length: 4:20 (album version); 3:51 (single version)
- Label: Casablanca Records
- Songwriters: Bob Esty; Michele Aller
- Producer: Bob Esty

Cher North American singles chronology
| "Take Me Home" (1979) | "Wasn't It Good" (1979) | "It's Too Late (To Love Me Now)" (1979) |

"Wasn't It Good" is a song written by producers Bob Esty and Michele Aller. The song was originally recorded by American singer-actress Cher.

== History ==
"Wasn't It Good" was released as the second single from Cher's 1979 album Take Me Home. "Wasn't It Good" was officially released in the United States, but in places such as the United Kingdom and Canada the song was only released as a promo. The song did enter the Billboard Hot 100, however it was not as successful as its predecessor. The song became a minor hit, peaking at number forty-nine.

The title track "Take Me Home" had previously been released to clubs and managed to peak in at number two on the Billboard Hot Dance Club Play chart; however, "Wasn't It Good" was never released as a club single. Remixes do exist for this song, some were released on the 12" single and one remix can be found on various compilations released in the 1990s.

Although "Wasn't It Good" and "It's Too Late to Love Me Now" were released as official singles from the album Take Me Home, neither one has a music video; instead, a music video was made for the title track and another song from the album, "Love and Pain" which were taped from the highly rated 1979 TV special Cher... and Other Fantasies.

== Charts ==
| Chart (1979) | Peak position |
|---|---|
| US Billboard Hot 100 | 49 |
| US Cash Box Top 100 | 69 |
