= Cher... Special =

- Written by: Cher; Buz Kohan; Rod Warren; Patricia Resnick
- Directed by: Art Fisher
- Starring: Cher; Dolly Parton; Rod Stewart; The Tubes
- Music by: Bill Conti
- Country of origin: United States
- Original language: English

Production
- Producers: Raymond Katz; Sandy Gallin
- Running time: 60 minutes

Original release
- Network: ABC
- Release: April 3, 1978

Cher... Special is a television special starring American singer/actress Cher that was broadcast on ABC on April 3, 1978, at 9:00 pm ET/PT and was recorded at ABC Studios in Los Angeles, California. Cher ... Special was a ratings success for ABC and it was ranked among the Top 10 most watched programs of the week. In the fall of 1978, it was honored with a technical Emmy Award for "Best Achievement in Lighting Direction". It also received an Emmy nomination for "Best Art Direction for a Comedy-Variety or Musical Special" and Dolly Parton was also nominated for an Emmy in the category of "Best Supporting Actress in a Variety or Musical Special".

== The show ==
The show features Dolly Parton, Rod Stewart and The Tubes. As the show begins, there is a spotlight on the floor and the voice of Georgia Holt, Cher's mother, is heard calling her young daughter: "Cher? Cher? Cher, is that you? I thought I asked you not to mess up my record albums." Cher steps into the spotlight, made up to look like a younger version of herself with her hair in pigtails. The young Cher sits on the floor and tells her mother that she is upset because she is not blonde and she says that all the pretty girls have blonde hair and blue eyes. Her mother tells her daughter that she is beautiful and someday she will realize just how special she really is. Cher tells her mother that she will try to understand and explains that she got into the record albums so that she could learn the songs from West Side Story for school. When her mother asks Cher what part she is going to play, Cher replies, "all of them".

Cher stands up, looks directly at the camera, and says, "Ladies and gentlemen, for tonight’s entertainment, I am proud to present West Side Story. I will be playing all the parts. Thank you." For the next fifteen minutes, Cher sings and dances to a medley of songs from the musical, playing both male and female characters.

Other segments include guests Dolly Parton and Rod Stewart, cast as neighbors in an apartment building, performing their hit songs "Two Doors Down" (Parton) and "Hot Legs" (Stewart); Cher and Dolly having a conversation consisting entirely of song titles and lyrics from pop songs; and Cher working by day in a boring secretarial job but dancing at night in the discos. Laverne, Cher's most famous character from the early days of The Sonny & Cher Comedy Hour, stops by for a quick chat to give Cher some words of wisdom.

The final segment is a big production number with a medley of songs performed by Cher, Dolly Parton, and The Tubes. Described as a "Musical Battle to Save Cher's Soul Medley", The Tubes try to lead her astray to the dark world of evil and sin while Dolly Parton and several gospel singers try to save her and show her the light.

Cher...Special concludes with Cher saying, "Momma, I'm still here. I've got the same hair, the same bumpy nose and vampire teeth. But you were right, I feel better about myself now". Then Cher's nine-year-old daughter Chastity asks, "Mom, have you been into my records again?" Cher says, "my children Chastity and Elijah both have blonde hair. I guess they don't have the advantages of having black hair, but nobody told them it was going to be easy." Then she sings "A Dream Is a Wish Your Heart Makes". As the final credits roll by, Cher's young son Elijah Blue Allman comes out and sits on her lap.

== Show running order ==
- "West Side Story Medley" performed by Cher
- "Hot Legs" performed by Rod Stewart
- "Two Doors Down" performed by Dolly Parton
- "Conversation in Song Lyrics", Cher, Parton
- "Musical Battle to Save Cher's Soul Medley" performed by Cher, Parton & The Tubes. The performance is a duel between the forces of good and evil to determine where Cher will spend eternity. Dolly Parton is dressed in white and, with a team of brightly clad singers, portrays an angel, while The Tubes, dressed in black leather, battle to send Cher's soul into eternal damnation. Songs performed include "Smoke (La Vie en Fumer)" and "Mondo Bondage" (the Tubes), "People Get Ready" (Parton), and "My Sweet Lord" (Cher).
- "A Dream Is A Wish Your Heart Makes" performed by Cher

== Video released ==
The complete "West Side Story Medley" is available in the DVD edition of The Farewell Tour as a special feature. In 2020, Time Life released the DVD set The Best of Cher, which included Cher...Special and Cher... and Other Fantasies (1979) as bonus features. It was an edited version of the special and does not include Rod Stewart, or Dolly and Cher's conversation.
