= Cher... and Other Fantasies =

- Written by: Cher; Buz Kohan; Patricia Resnick; Arthur Sellers
- Directed by: Art Fisher
- Starring: Cher; Lucille Ball; Andy Kaufman; Shelley Winters; Elliott Gould; Bill Saluga
- Music by: Bill Conti
- Country of origin: United States
- Original language: English

Production
- Producers: Raymond Katz; Sandy Gallin
- Running time: 60 minutes

Original release
- Network: NBC
- Release: March 7, 1979

Cher... and Other Fantasies is a television special starring American singer-actress Cher that was broadcast on NBC on March 7, 1979, at 7:00 pm ET/PT. It received an Emmy Award nomination for Outstanding Costumes for a Miniseries, Movie, or Special.

== Show running order ==
- "Ain't Nobody's Business" performed by Cher
- "Love & Pain (Pain in My Heart)" performed by Cher
- "Feel Like a Number" performed by Cher
- "More Than You Know" performed by Cher
- "Take Me Home" performed by Cher
- "Take Me Home (Ballad Version)" performed by Cher

== Home video release ==
In 2020, Time Life released the DVD set The Best of Cher, which Cher... Special (1978) and Cher... and Other Fantasies as bonus features.
