= Corleone Mafia family =

Crime family of the Sicilian mafia

- Founded: c. 1900s
- Founder: Angelo Gagliano
- Founding location: Corleone, Sicily
- Years active: c. 1900s–present
- Territory: Corleone and surrounding cities.
- Ethnicity: Sicilians
- Activities: extortion, drug trafficking, bid rigging
- Allies: Historically maintains pragmatic ties with Palermo Mafia families.

The Corleone Mafia family, also called the Leggio Mafia family, is a crime family of the Cosa Nostra based in the town of Corleone, Sicily. At its peak, it was dominated by the Corleonesi headed by Totò Riina and, for over a decade, was the most powerful mafia family in Italy and the world.

Born as a group of tax collectors and cattle rustlers in the service of local lords, the Corleone family became very powerful by the 1950s, growing to the point of supplanting the Palermo families in the 1980s, when it emerged victorious from the Second Mafia War (1981–1982). Its supremacy within Cosa Nostra lasted for 10 years, when the bloodthirsty and anti-state regime of Riina led to a harsh repression in the early 1990s that led to the family's defeat, with many members imprisoned under the 41 bis regime.

Today the family has around 70 "men of honour", many of whom are in prison, and is the head of the Corleone mandamento, which includes several municipalities in the Palermo metropolitan area.

== History ==
=== Origins ===
The Corleone Mafia family traces its origins to the early 1900s and was likely founded by Angelo Gagliano, a relative of Tommy Gagliano, who would later establish the Lucchese crime family in New York City. Angelo Gagliano was accused of the attempted murder of Bernardino Verro in 1910 and of his killing in 1915; however, he was acquitted of these charges in 1928. Verro, a trade union leader associated with the Fasci Siciliani and former mayor of Corleone, had himself joined the Corleone Mafia family, known among its members as the Fratuzzi (“Little Brothers”), in order to strengthen the strikes and ensure his personal protection.

Gagliano remained in power until 1930, when he was assassinated. He was succeeded by Calogero Lo Bue, a traditionalist boss who devoted himself primarily to activities such as smuggling, extortion, and the handling of stolen goods. His leadership also faced Fascist repression, which was weakening the Palermo mafia families, although the Corleone family was not particularly affected. In 1945, following the end of the war, Angelo Di Carlo, Gagliano’s nephew, returned from the United States, where he had served in the Marine Corps, and peacefully deposed Lo Bue, who was deemed “unsuitable for the times”, prompting his retirement from public life. Di Carlo would maintain a strong influence within the family in the years that followed, even being regarded as the "front boss".

=== Navarra era ===
Di Carlo placed his cousin Michele Navarra, a respected local doctor and "man of honor," at the head of the family. Navarra and Di Carlo also had a brief dispute with Vincenzo Collura, known as Mr. Vincent, who had also returned from the States, over who should lead the family, but Collura gave up in exchange for the position of vice-boss.

After having obtained the command of the Corleone family, Navarra had Liborio Ansalone, commander of the local police who in 1926 had collaborated with the men of the prefect Cesare Mori to have numerous mafiosi arrested in Corleone, assassinated. Navarra began a regime of local supremacy, first taking control of the Corleone hospital, killing its head, probably in 1946, who at the time was Carmelo Nicolosi. Later Navarra began to support the Sicilian Movement for the Independence of Sicily as early as 1946, and then sided with the Christian Democracy in 1948 and its local leaders Calogero Volpe, Salvatore Aldisio and Bernardo Mattarella, also bringing votes to them through the control of public companies, such as the Sicilian Transport Company, also used for other illicit purposes.

Navarra also began a conflict with local trade union representatives, such as Placido Rizzotto, secretary of the Corleone Chamber of Labor and socialist leader assassinated in 1948. The murder was also due to the fact that Rizzotto had dared to hang his pupil Luciano Leggio from the railing of the municipal villa.

Over time, it was Leggio who became a problem for Navarra, because while he wanted to keep the mafia a rural phenomenon, Leggio wanted to expand it to a metropolitan phenomenon, with connections with major national politicians, entrepreneurs and officials. In particular, Navarra did not tolerate the political ideas of Leggio (who supported the local PLI), compromising his relations with the DC, and his favorable attitude to the construction of a dam (for which he would have won the contract) which would have made him lose control of the wells. In 1958 Navarra then organized the elimination of Leggio, who however was only wounded by a commando. Having learned of the failure, Navarra did not have time to try the murder again. On 2 August 1958, Navarra and his young colleague Giovanni Russo were murdered, riddled with bullets from a Thompson submachine gun, while they were on board a Fiat 1100 .

=== Leggio era ===
After Navarra's death, within the Corleone family, Leggio began to initiate an internal purge. On 6 September 1958, Leggio's killers killed the three heads of the family, namely Marco and Giovanni Marino and Pietro Maiuri, guilty of having been too close to Navarra. In the following months there were several murders and cases of lupara bianca perpetrated by Leggio, who wanted to "cleanse" the family of the old guard: one of the few survivors was Angelo Di Carlo, who probably maintained the role of advisor to the clan. At the same time as the executions, the Corleone family also set foot in Palermo, since Leggio had purchased a mechanical workshop and a garage, where the meat was illegally slaughtered and then resold, evading taxes. Furthermore, Leggio formed an alliance with the families of the mafia members Angelo La Barbera, Rosario Mancino, Vincenzo Rimi and Salvatore "Ciaschiteddu" Greco, with whom his relations would have been compromised already in the early 1960s.

Under Leggio's leadership, the gang experienced its golden years, thanks also to the lucrative rigged contracts and metropolitan rackets that the gang was getting its hands on. However, the 1963 Mafia War, in which some policemen also died, triggered a crackdown on Cosa Nostra which led to Leggio's arrest on 14 May 1964, who was tried for the murders that had taken place in Corleone 6 years earlier. During the arrest, the police found a catheter, which led to Leggio's admission that he suffered from Pott's disease. Leggio was however acquitted during the Bari trial in 1968, which instead saw the conviction of his ally Angelo La Barbera.

In 1970, Leggio's leadership in Corleone became increasingly shaky, having moved to Milan and often being represented at the Provincial Commission by Salvatore Riina, his right-hand man. In Milan, Leggio became involved in kidnappings, as well as extortion and loan sharking. Here he also linked himself to figures of the Calabrian 'Ndrangheta, such as Domenico "Mico" Tripodo and his deputy Paolo De Stefano. Another "Milanese" associate of Leggio was Lorenzo Nuvoletta, who was the head of a mafia family operating in the Naples area, as a Camorra clan, but which was also a local branch of Cosa Nostra, Lorenzo and his brothers being "punciuti", that is, official members of the Sicilian Mafia.

Leggio was captured in Milan on 16 May 1974. In 1975, he was finally sentenced to life imprisonment by Judge Cesare Terranova for the murder of Michele Navarra, and was incarcerated in Nuoro prison.

=== Riina era ===
By the end of the 1970s, Riina, who was Leggio's lieutenant and also a fugitive, was in control of the Corleonesi clan. The Corleonesi's primary rivals were Stefano Bontade, Salvatore Inzerillo and Tano Badalamenti, bosses of various powerful Palermo Mafia families. Between 1981 and 1983, Bontade and Inzerillo, together with many associates and members of both their Mafia and blood families, were killed. There were up to a thousand killings during this period as Riina and the Corleonesi, together with their allies, wiped out their rivals. By the end of the war, the Corleonesi were effectively ruling the Mafia, and over the next few years Riina increased his influence by eliminating the Corleonesi's allies, such as Filippo Marchese, Giuseppe Greco and Rosario Riccobono. In February 1980, Tommaso Buscetta fled to Brazil to escape the brewing Second Mafia War instigated by Riina.

Whereas Riina's predecessors had kept a low profile, leading some in law enforcement to question the very existence of the Mafia, Riina ordered the murders of judges, policemen and prosecutors in an attempt to terrify the authorities. A law to create a new offence of Mafia association and confiscate Mafia assets was introduced by Pio La Torre, secretary of the Italian Communist Party in Sicily, but it had been stalled in parliament for two years. La Torre was murdered on 30 April 1982. In May 1982, the Italian government sent Carlo Alberto Dalla Chiesa, a general of the Italian Carabinieri, to Sicily with orders to crush the Mafia. However, not long after arriving, on 3 September 1982, he was gunned down in the city centre with his wife, Emanuela Setti Carraro, and his driver bodyguard, Domenico Russo. In response to public disquiet about the failure to effectively combat the organisation Riina headed, La Torre's law was passed ten days later. On 11 September 1982, Buscetta's two sons from his first wife, Benedetto and Antonio, disappeared, never to be found again, which prompted his collaboration with Italian authorities. This was followed by the deaths of his brother Vincenzo, son-in-law Giuseppe Genova, brother-in-law Pietro and four of his nephews, Domenico and Benedetto Buscetta, and Orazio and Antonio D 'Amico. Buscetta was arrested in São Paulo, Brazil once again on 23 October 1983, and extradited to Italy on 28 June 1984. Buscetta asked to talk to the anti-Mafia judge Giovanni Falcone, and began his life as an informant, referred to as a pentito.

Buscetta was the first high-profile Sicilian Mafiosi to become an informant; he revealed that the Mafia was a single organisation led by a Commission, or Cupola (Dome), thereby establishing that the top tier of Mafia members were complicit in all the organisation's crimes. Buscetta helped judges Falcone and Paolo Borsellino achieve significant success in the fight against organized crime that led to 475 Mafia members indicted, and 338 convicted in the Maxi Trial.

Seeing his position weakened, Riina pursued his strategy of massacres with the intention of putting an end to the Italian state apparatus in Sicily. The work of the judges, however, continued steadfastly with even harsher repression that led to the law on the confiscation of mafia assets, harsh prison sentences (the infamous Article 41 bis), and the dispatch of military troops to Sicily. Riina also had to deal with some internal discontent within the Corleone family, particularly that of Bernardo Provenzano, who was opposed to Riina for those high-profile murders that were drawing attention to Cosa Nostra and preferred to return Cosa Nostra to its former secret society. Provenzano's intention found agreement with several mafia bosses. The height of Riina's ferocity was reached with the bombings of 1992 and 1993, followed by the State-Mafia Pact.

=== Provenzano era ===
On 15 January 1993, Riina was arrested and sentenced to 23 life sentences. At the same time, Provenzano assumed command of the family and went into hiding, making himself untraceable, also to help Cosa Nostra return to a less prominent position. Riina's brother-in-law, Leoluca Bagarella, also ran the clan for a short time, but he was arrested two years later, on 24 June 1995. Provenzano led the family until 11 April 2006, the day of his arrest after a record 43 years on the run. He was remembered as the last boss of the Corleonesi clan, as by the mid-1990s, that clan had gradually entered a steep decline, particularly following the arrest of Riina, who, after taking over from Michele Greco as head of the commission, left the position vacant. The Commission no longer had a secretary, but only informal leaders, including Matteo Messina Denaro.

=== Current status ===
After the elimination of its leading members in 1993, which also led to the disappearance of the "Corleonesi", and the arrest of Provenzano in 2006, the Corleone clan lost its power and almost completely ended its activities and trafficking. After the arrest of Riina, the Corleone family lost influence in Palermo, maintaining control only of the southern area of the Province. Today it is estimated to have around 70 "men of honour", many of whom are in prison and elderly.

== Leadership ==
- c.1900–1930 — Angelo Gagliano – murdered in 1930.
- 1930–1945 — Calogero Lo Bue – removed and retired in 1945.
- 1945–1958 — Michele "'u patri nostru" Navarra — assassinated 2 August 1958.
- 1958–1974 — Luciano "Lucianeddu" Leggio — imprisoned 1964—1971 and 1974–1993, demoted to councilor in 1974.
  - Acting 1964—1971 — Salvatore Riina.
- 1974–1993 — Salvatore "Totò u Curtu" Riina — imprisoned January 1993.
  - Acting 1993—1995 — Leoluca Bagarella, Bernardo Provenzano.
- 1995–2006 — Bernardo Provenzano — imprisoned April 2006.
- 2006–2014 — Rosario Lo Bue — arrested in the Carabinieri operation called Grande Passo 3.
- 2014–2023 — Giovanni Grizzaffi — died in 2023.
- 2023—2026 — Mario Grizzaffi — Arrested in a Carabinieri operation
