= Panepinto =

Panepinto is a surname. Notable people with the surname include:

- Julie Panepinto, American pediatric hematologist-oncologist and physician-scientist
- Lorenzo Panepinto (1865–1911), Italian politician and teacher
- Marc Panepinto, American attorney and politician
- Mike Panepinto (born 1965), American football player
