= Nicola Alongi =

Sicilian socialist leader

- Born: January 22, 1863; Prizzi, Kingdom of Italy
- Died: February 29, 1920 (aged 57); Prizzi, Kingdom of Italy
- Occupation: Socialist leader
- Known for: Murdered by the Sicilian Mafia

Nicola Alongi (Italian pronunciation: [niˈkɔːla aˈlɔndʒi; aˈlondʒi]; January 22, 1863 – February 29, 1920), was a Sicilian socialist leader, involved in the Fasci Siciliani (Sicilian Leagues) a popular movement of democratic and socialist inspiration in 1891–1894. He was killed by the Mafia.

== Socialist leader ==
With Giuseppe Marò and Salvatore Tortorici, he was one of the founders of the Fasci in Prizzi in 1893 following the example of Bernardino Verro in the neighbouring town of Corleone.

In the early 20th century, with the agrarian strike in 1901 and the resumption of struggle for land reform, he joined other peasant leaders like Verro and Lorenzo Panepinto from Santo Stefano Quisquina with whom he designed a change of strategy of political struggle, aiming to organise peasants in collective leaseholds through cooperatives and agricultural banks, to reduce dependence on the leaseholders (gabelloto) of the large rural estates.

After the murders of Panepinto in 1911 and Verro in 1915, he became the leader of the peasant movement in the region and built a solid political and human relationship with Giovanni Orcel, leader of the metalworkers in Palermo. They theorized the need for unity between peasants and industrial workers for social change even before Antonio Gramsci, one of the most important Marxist thinkers of the twentieth century.

== Biennio rosso ==
After World War I, Sicilian peasants returning from the front found a disastrous economic situation. During their military service their fields had been abandoned and overgrown, and inflation reduced them to starvation. The only people who had become rich by taking advantage of this situation, were the landowners and their leaseholders. Social tension began to rise across the country, known as the biennio rosso (red biennium – 1919–1920), and the government feared that the Soviet revolution could be extended to Italy.

To counter this situation, the government of Francesco Saverio Nitti issued the Visocchi-decree in 1919, followed by the Falcioni-decree in 1920, which allowed the granting of ill-cultivated and uncultivated land to cooperatives formed by war veterans. For the first time the State gave landless peasants the necessary legal instruments to claim the right to land, despite the ambiguities and red tape.

Throughout the country cooperatives were established to apply for land to cultivate. In Corleone and Prizzi cooperatives were created thanks to socialist leaders like Alongi and Vincenzo Schillaci. In Prizzi, Alongi was the animator of the cooperative "The Proletarian" that was opposed by a cooperative set up by Mafia boss Silvestre "Sisì" Gristina, the brother of the mayor of Prizzi, Epifanio Gristina. Gristina attempted to block the push for renewal that Alongi and his group carried out intimidating and infiltrating the peasant movement. When this attempt failed, the local landowners went the hard way to stop the socialists.

== Murder ==
In August 1919, the alliance between peasant and workers promoted by Alongi and Orcel materialized when peasants in the area of Corleone and Prizzi began a strike, claiming not only the improvement of wages, but also radical legislation for agrarian reform. Orcel and other socialist leaders supported this position by organizing a national rally in Palermo to support the agitation of the peasants in Sicily and the expropriation of land.

The reaction to the social upheaval came from the Mafia. Mafia boss Gristina first ordered the murder of Alongi's friend and pupil, Giuseppe Rumore, secretary of the Lega di miglioramento (League of improvement) in Prizzi, on September 22, 1919. Alongi, considered already "a dead man on leave," did not change the programme of land tenure. On February 29, 1920, he was shot and killed in Prizzi at the orders of Gristina.

On October 14, 1920, Alongi's ally Giovanni Orcel was killed as well. With the killing of Orcel and Alongi, the undisputed leaders of "red biennium" union movement in Sicily was repressed. The advent of Fascism in the following years definitively ended the period of agitation. The story of the murders of Alongi and Orcel had its ending January 21, 1921, with the killing of the man who is regarded as the principal behind the killings, Silvestre Gristina. His murder is still unsolved and is considered to be a case of "proletarian justice".

== Biography ==
- Marino, Giuseppe Carlo (1997), Vita politica e martirio di Nicola Alongi, contadino socialista, Palermo: Edizioni Novecento

== See also ==
- List of victims of the Sicilian Mafia
