= Michele Navarra =

Italian mafia boss

- Born: 5 January 1905; Corleone, Sicily, Italy
- Died: 2 August 1958 (aged 53); Corleone, Sicily, Italy
- Cause of death: Gunshots
- Other name: 'u patri nostru
- Allegiance: Corleone Mafia family / Cosa Nostra

Michele Navarra (Italian pronunciation: [miˈkɛːle naˈvarra]; 5 January 1905 – 2 August 1958) was an Italian member of the Sicilian Mafia. He was a qualified physician and headed the Corleone Mafia family in Sicily. He was known as 'u patri nostru (our father).

== Early career ==
Navarra was born in the Sicilian town of Corleone in a middle class family; his father was a small landowner, a land surveyor and a teacher at the local agrarian school. His uncle from his mother’s side, Angelo Gagliano, had been a member of the Fratuzzi, as the local Mafia was known at the time and which consisted mainly of gabellotti, local power brokers that leased large estates from absentee landlords, and subleased plots to peasants at excessive or abusive rates. He was killed in 1930.

Navarra studied at the University of Palermo, first engineering and later medicine, getting his degree in 1929. He served in the Royal Italian Army until 1942, reaching the rank of captain. He became the boss of Corleone in 1943, succeeding Calogero Lo Bue.

Navarra was the old-fashioned type of Mafia boss: genteel, well-dressed, but ferocious. He usually did not murder people himself but delegated the work. From 1944–48, when he took over command of the Mafia in town, there had been 57 murders in Corleone. By skilful manipulation of the Mafia network of mutual aid and graft, he occupied several key positions in the establishment of Corleone, had powerful political connections and enjoyed a high status. He became the official medical adviser to the Ferrovie dello Stato (Italian State Railways), which was offered to him when, in public competition, he was the only candidate.

== Rising power ==
Following the Allied invasion of Sicily in World War II (Operation Husky) in 1943, the Allied Military Government of Occupied Territories (AMGOT) granted Navarra the right to collect the military vehicles abandoned by the Italian army. Navarra used these to start a trucking company, which was vital to some of his operations involving the theft of livestock. In 1946 Navarra became the top doctor at the hospital in Corleone after his predecessor, Dr. Nicolosi, was conveniently murdered. A new large modern hospital in Corleone stood empty from 1952 to 1958 and was only put into service after the death of Navarra, the director of the old one.

Navarra used his position as director of the hospital to increase his power. In Corleone, people still talk of the blind electors of Navarra: On election day hundreds of men and women were struck blind; they pretended to have lost their sight. He issued certificates to the effect that they were blind or short-sighted and therefore had to be assisted in the act of voting in order to enable Navarra’s men to accompany them into the polling booth and check their ballot.

For a while Navarra sympathized with the Sicilian separatist movement, but he soon joined the Christian Democrat party in 1948.

== Rizzotto murder ==
Under the tutelage of Navarra, the young and upcoming Mafioso Luciano Leggio got his start, first in cattle rustling and clandestine butchering, and subsequently as estate guard (campiere), before becoming a leaseholder (gabelloto) of the estate at the age of 20, the youngest ever. When Leggio murdered the Socialist trade union leader Placido Rizzotto in March 1948, Navarra made sure to dispose of the only witness, Giuseppe Letizia, an 11-year-old shepherd. His father took the shocked boy to the hospital run by Navarra. The boy talked about the murder but died after an injection. Navarra was blamed by the press for killing the boy and thus eliminating a witness.

Navarra was arrested for his involvement in the murder, but not convicted. He was sent into compulsory internal exile in Gioiosa Ionica, province of Reggio Calabria, for five years. However, thanks to his contacts with friendly politicians, he returned to Corleone in 1949. In Calabria he established close relationships with the charismatic 'Ndrangheta boss Antonio Macrì.

== Conflict with Leggio ==
Meanwhile, his former underling Leggio developed his own rackets, independently from Navarra – transport, smuggling stolen cattle and selling the meat on Palermo’s wholesale market. From 1953–1958 Corleone recorded 153 Mafia-related murders.

Conflicts of interest between Navarra and Leggio also arose over a plan to dam the Belice river at the Piano della Scala near Corleone. Those who controlled the water supply throughout the neighbourhood of Corleone resented the plan. Springs in Sicily are private property and their exploitation, yielding large profits, is traditionally associated with Mafia power. Navarra represented the vested interests of those opposed to the dam, while Leggio favoured the construction of the dam. He expected to gain a monopoly of haulage work in connection with its construction.

Navarra tried to have Leggio killed in June 1958. Leggio was invited by Navarra to meet him at an estate but instead, he found fifteen armed men there. The hitmen hired for the task did a poor job and Leggio escaped with just minor injuries. The event left Leggio and his followers with the knowledge that they were as good as dead if they did not strike back soon.

The bullet-riddled Fiat of Navarra

== Death ==
A few weeks later, on 2 August 1958, Navarra and a fellow doctor (Giovanni Russo, who had nothing to do with criminal activities) were both shot dead on an isolated country road as they drove home in Navarra's Fiat 1100. The car was blocked on the open road by two other vehicles and riddled with submachine gun bullets. Navarra's funeral took place two days later in San Martino, the main church of Corleone. A few weeks later, on September 6, three men known as friends of Navarra were killed in a raid at Corleone. Reciprocal killings continued until 1963, and Leggio had to disappear having been condemned for the killing of Navarra.

Leggio thus became the boss of the Corleone Mafia. Among Navarra's suspected murderers were Bernardo Provenzano and Salvatore "Totò" Riina. Riina became the leading Mafioso in 1974 after Leggio was captured and sentenced to life imprisonment for his murder. His Corleonesi would continue to take over the Sicilian Mafia in the Second Mafia War in the 1980s.

Navarra was more interested in power than money. He left his widow a few plots of land and part of a house. The Antimafia Commission remarked that “the small size of his estate shows that Navarra has always aimed at power, rather than at money for its own sake … He often spent more than he brought in, both in his medical activities and in his career as Mafioso.”

== Sources ==
- Arlacchi, Pino (1988). Mafia Business. The Mafia ethic and the spirit of capitalism, Oxford: Oxford University Press ISBN 0-19-285197-7
- Dickie, John (2004). Cosa Nostra. A history of the Sicilian Mafia, London: Hodder & Stoughton, ISBN 0-340-82435-2
- Hess, Henner (1998). Mafia & Mafiosi: Origin, Power, and Myth, London: Hurst & Co Publishers, ISBN 1-85065-500-6 (Review)
- Lewis, Norman (1964/1967). The Honoured Society: The Sicilian Mafia Observed, Harmondsworth: Penguin Books.
- Paoli, Letizia (2003). Mafia Brotherhoods: Organized Crime, Italian Style, Oxford/New York: Oxford University Press ISBN 0-19-515724-9
- Schneider, Jane T. & Peter T. Schneider (2003). Reversible Destiny: Mafia, Antimafia, and the Struggle for Palermo, Berkeley: University of California Press ISBN 0-520-23609-2
- Servadio, Gaia (1976), Mafioso. A history of the Mafia from its origins to the present day, London: Secker & Warburg ISBN 0-436-44700-2
- Stille, Alexander (1995). Excellent Cadavers. The Mafia and the Death of the First Italian Republic, New York: Vintage ISBN 0-09-959491-9
