= Salemi (surname) =

Salemi is a surname. Notable people with the surname include:

- Giulia Salemi (born 1993), Italian televisión presenter and model
- Joseph Salemi (1902–2003), American jazz trombonist
- Prince Umberto, Count of Salemi (1889–1918), Italian military personnel
- Silvia Salemi (born 1978), Italian singer-songwriter and television personality

== See also ==
- Salem (name)
