= Lorenzo Panepinto =

Italian politician

- Born: January 4, 1865; Santo Stefano Quisquina, Italy
- Died: May 16, 1911 (aged 46); Santo Stefano Quisquina, Italy
- Occupations: Teacher, painter and politician
- Known for: Socialist leader of the Fasci Siciliani; Murdered by the Sicilian Mafia

Lorenzo Panepinto (Italian pronunciation: [loˈrɛntso paneˈpinto]; January 4, 1865 – May 16, 1911) was an Italian politician and teacher. He was the founder of the Fascio dei lavoratori (Workers League) in his hometown Santo Stefano Quisquina, editor of the newspaper La Plebe and member of the Comitato della Federazione Regionale Socialista. He was killed by the Sicilian Mafia.

== Early years ==
Born in Santo Stefano Quisquina in the Province of Agrigento, he became a primary school teacher and an artist. His great passion was painting and the other was politics. In 1889 he was elected city councilor in the democratic-republican group inspired by Giuseppe Mazzini, challenging the traditional powers.

The latter reacted vehemently by dissolving the council and replace it with a Royal Commissioner. Nevertheless, the move failed to prevent a second defeat of the conservatives in the elections of August 1890. The government of Antonio di Rudini again dissolved the council and appointed a new Commissioner. Panepinto resigned in protest and dedicated himself to teaching and painting.

== Organizing the peasantry ==
He married and moved to Naples. Returning to Sicily in 1893, he noted the state of turmoil caused by the movement of the Fasci Siciliani. He set up the Fascio in Santo Stefano Quisquina, which was dissolved after only a few months by the Government of Francesco Crispi, who violently repressed the movement in January 1894. In the same year Panepinto joined the Italian Socialist Party. In an act of political reprisal, he was dismissed from his post of elementary school teacher by the municipality. Not discouraged, he continued to study pedagogy and educational methodologies and published two didactic volumes in 1897.

In the early 20th century, with the resumption of agricultural strikes, Panepinto joined other peasant leaders like Bernardino Verro from Corleone and Nicola Alongi from Prizzi. They designed a change of strategy of political struggle, aiming to organise peasants in collective leaseholds through cooperatives and agricultural banks, to reduce dependence on the leaseholders (gabelloto) of the large rural estates.

== In the United States ==
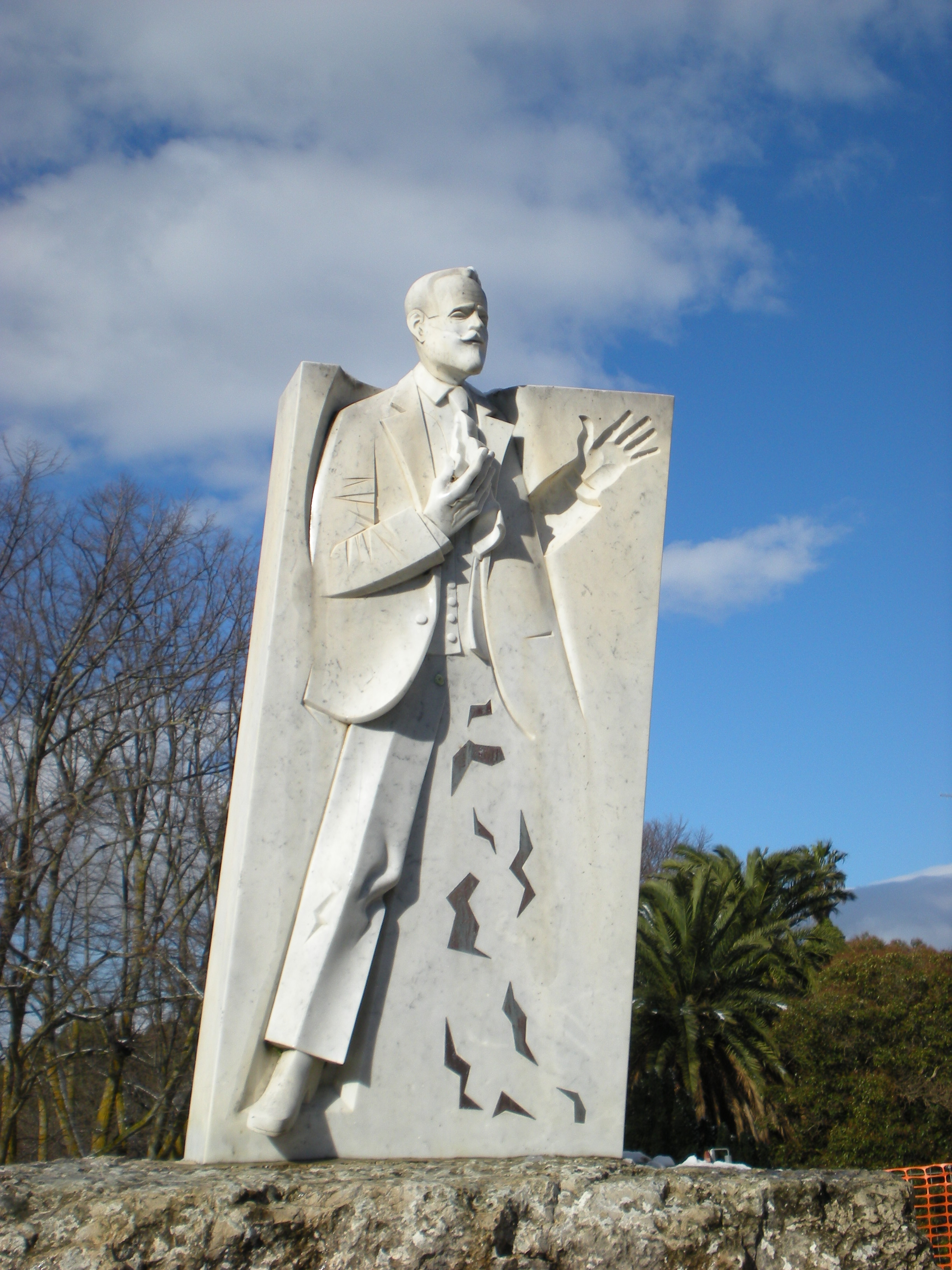
Statue of Lorenzo Panepinto in Santo Stefano Quisquina

In 1907 he traveled to the United States. Many townspeople from San Stefano Quisquina had emigrated to the United States, in particular to Tampa, Florida, where they worked in the cigar-making industry. They had left their country, but not their radical ideas. They fitted in seamlessly with the labour culture of workers from Spanish and Cuban origin in the struggle for better labour conditions.

But they also financially supported the setting up of the agricultural cooperative Unione agricola in their original hometown San Stefano Quisquina in 1902. They invited Panepinto for a trip that would last eight months.

== Death ==
On May 16, 1911, he was assassinated in Santo Stefano Quisquina, just before the entrance of his house, with two gunshots in the chest. At the funeral, over 4,000 people followed the open coffin in procession. His killers were identified among the gabelloti with links to the Mafia, but the material killer was released by the Court of Catania in April 1914. No one has ever been convicted for the crime.

In Tampa the most popular socialist group of the city adopted his name after Panepinto's assassination. The group pledged a yearly stipend of 1,200 lire to the socialist section in their former hometown for work among the peasantry

In October 1920, the socialists of Santo Stefano Quisquina managed to conquer the city hall again, electing as mayor Giuseppe Cammarata, Panepinto's friend and collaborator, who continued the battle.

== See also ==
- List of victims of the Sicilian Mafia
