= Leoluca =

Christian abbot and saint in Calabria (c. 815 – c. 915)

Saint Leoluca
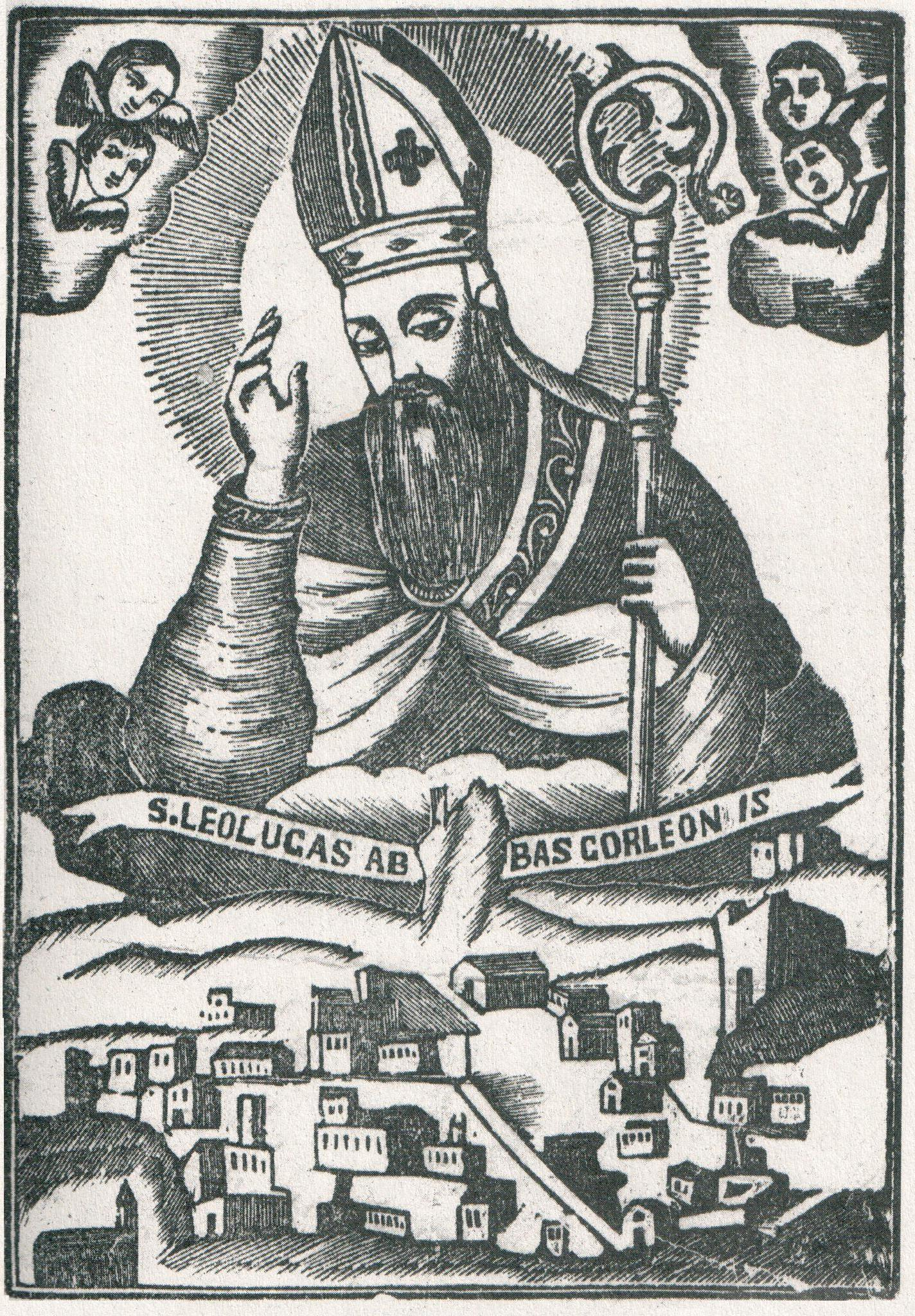
- Votive image of St. Leoluca

Abbot, Venerable
- Born: c. 815; Corleone, Sicily
- Died: c. 915
- Venerated in: Roman Catholic Church; Eastern Orthodox Church
- Major shrine: San Leoluca Church, Corleone
- Feast: 1 March
- Patronage: Corleone, Sicily; Vibo Valentia, Calabria

Leoluca, also known as Leone Luca, Leo Luke of Corleone, or Luke of Sicily (c. 815 – c. 915) was the abbot and wonderworker of the monastery of Mount Mula in Calabria, (Note: Mount Mula, or Monte La Mula (1935 m), is one of the highest peaks of the Orsomarso mountains, near Cassano.) and a founder of Italo-Greek monasticism in southern Italy. (Note: "The term 'Italo-Greek monasticism' refers to the implantation and history of Byzantine monasticism in Sicily and southern Italy. By the mid 9th c. Sicily was already reputed to be the home of numerous Greek hermits and small gatherings of monks famed for their ascetic experience. Substantial documentary evidence for the presence of Byzantine monks in southern Italy first appears in the 9th and 10th cc. and consists primarily in the lives of the great ascetic saints of this region." We ought tentatively to regard it as probable that the saints whose lives have come down to us were really the founders of Greek monasticism in South Italy, and that before their time there were no Greek monasteries in the district. There probably were hermits; but the rise of monasteries does not begin before the end of the ninth century; and the leaders of the monks were Elias Junior (†903), Elias Spelaeotes ("the Cave-Dweller", †c. 960), Lucas of Demena (†984), Vitalis of Castronuovo (†994), and Nilus of Rossano (†1004).) He is venerated as a saint in the Roman Catholic and Eastern Orthodox churches.

Born in the Sicilian town of Corleone, he died about a hundred years later, after eighty years of monastic life, (Note: The island of Sicily passed to the Greek Rite during the six years when Constans II made Syracuse his residence and the capital of the Byzantine Empire (i.e. starting between 663AD - 668AD).) in Monteleone Calabro, now Vibo Valentia in Calabria. Today he is a patron saint of both towns, and his feast day is celebrated on 1 March.

In 2006 Leoluca's relics were found in the municipality of San Gregorio d'Ippona, about 2 km southeast of the city of Vibo Valentia.

== Hagiographic sources ==
The text of the Life of Leo Luke of Corleone was published in 1657 in the Sicilian martyrology of Jesuit Ottavio Gaetani ("Vitae Sanctorum Siculorum"). (Note: After Fr. Gaetani's death in AD 1620, his manuscript of the Lives of Sicilian saints was edited by Fr. Peter Salerno SJ, and published posthumously in 1657.) He was said to have derived it from three manuscripts discovered in Sicily: one from Palermo, another from Mazara and a third from Corleone.

Later, the Bollandists published another Life, in Latin, found in the library of Joseph Acosta.

None of the Latin manuscripts of the hagiography of Leo Luke refer to an original Greek source. However the presence of Greek anthroponyms (such as Leone, Teotiste, Christopher, Teodoro, Eutimio) may postulate an original source in Greek. The hagiography was likely composed immediately after the death of Leoluca in Calabria, but may have been passed down orally and then in writing at a later date and in another place. (Note: Msgr. Paul Collura also notes that "the essential core of our ancient legends has a substrate that should not be underestimated, and since the Arab domination in Sicily (827–1092) made a clean sweep of all the written documents, sacred and profane, the memory of several Saints has been handed down only on the thread of memory.")

== Life ==
=== In Sicily ===
Leoluca was born in Corleone, Sicily in the 9th century AD (c.815 to 818 AD), on the eve of the Saracen invasion of Sicily. (Note: The first Arab battle against Byzantine troops occurred on July 15, 827, near Mazara, resulting in an Aghlabid victory. It took over a century for Byzantine Sicily to be conquered. Syracuse held out for a long time, and Taormina fell in 902. Eventually all of Sicily was conquered by the Arabs in 965, and the Emirate of Sicily was formed, an Islamic state on the island of Sicily which existed from 965 to 1072.) His parents Leo and Theoktiste baptized him Leo, in honour of his father. They were a pious and wealthy family who raised him in the nurture and admonition of the Lord. He was orphaned at an early age when his parents died, and devoted himself to managing the estate and supervising the herds as a shepherd. In the solitude of the fields he realized that he had a call to religious life, so he sold the estate, gave the money to the poor, and went to the monastery of St. Philip in Agira, in the province of Enna, Sicily.

It is not known how long he stayed at the monastery at Agira, but due to the raids of the Saracens, he left from there and went to Calabria. (Note: With the Arab invasion of Sicily (from 827 AD through to 878 AD) many monks left the island and took refuge in Calabria.) Before going to Calabria however, he made a special point of going on pilgrimage to visit the tombs of Saint Peter and Paul the Apostle in Rome. (Note: "Legally monks could not change monasteries, but provincial monks were strikingly mobile. Elias the Younger, sojourning in Sicily, North Africa, the Levant, Greece and Italy was the best travelled of the Italo-Greek monks whose lives are known. But even the least travelled of these saw much of South Italy and usually Sicily as well as Rome. There are numerous examples of monks, singly or in groups, who migrated into greater solitude to escape popularity. Nilos, who died in 1004 left Rossano with all his monks to live amongst the Latins in order to evade the obligations entailed by his fame among the Greeks. When the proximity of Monte Cassino ceased to please him, Nilos again uprooted his community, establishing it first at Serperi and later at Grottaferrata. This individual and communal transience must have undermined the position of the bishops, if not made their control of monasteries virtually impossible.")

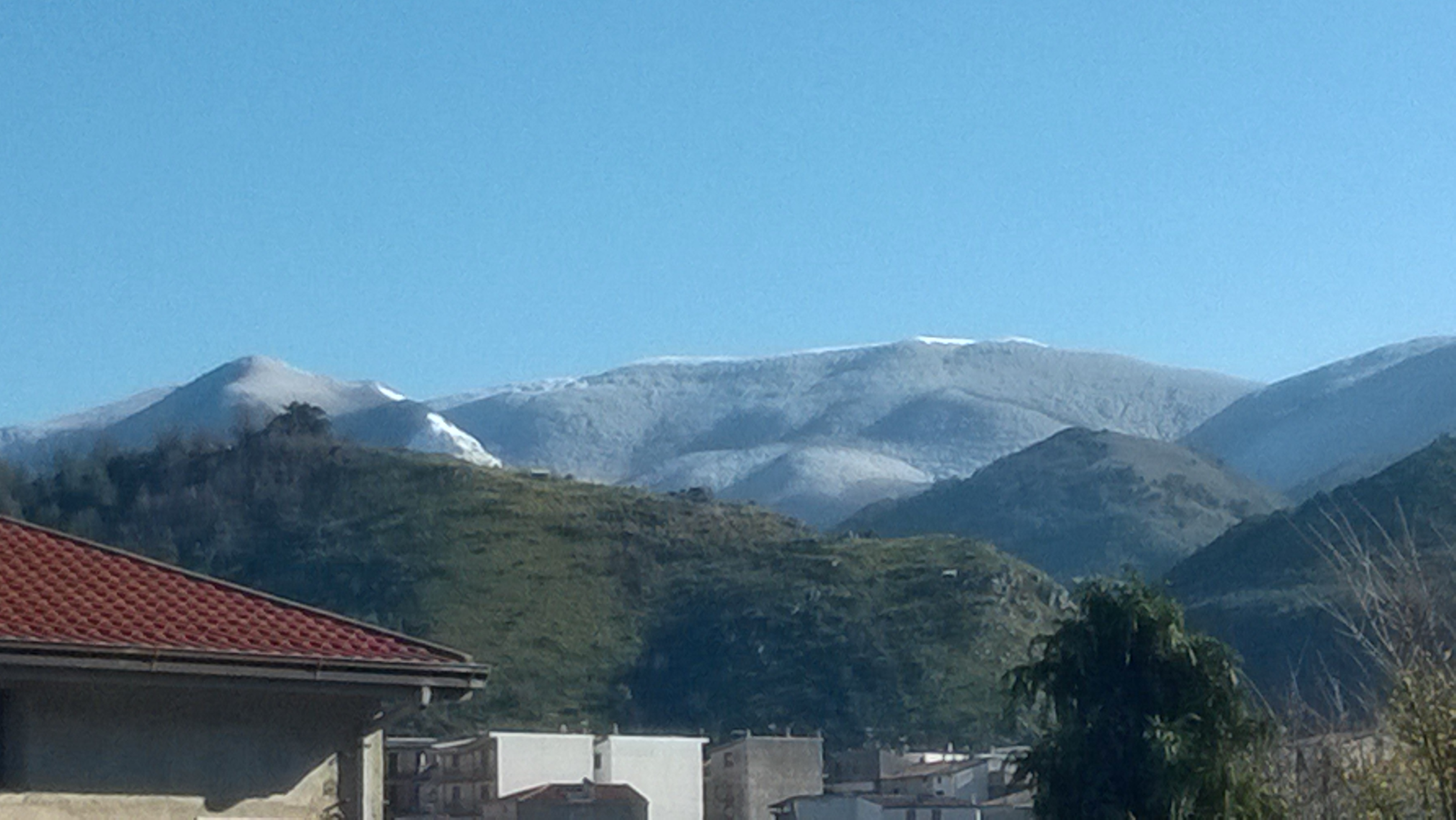
The snow capped Monte La Mula, seen from Grisolia.

=== In Calabria ===
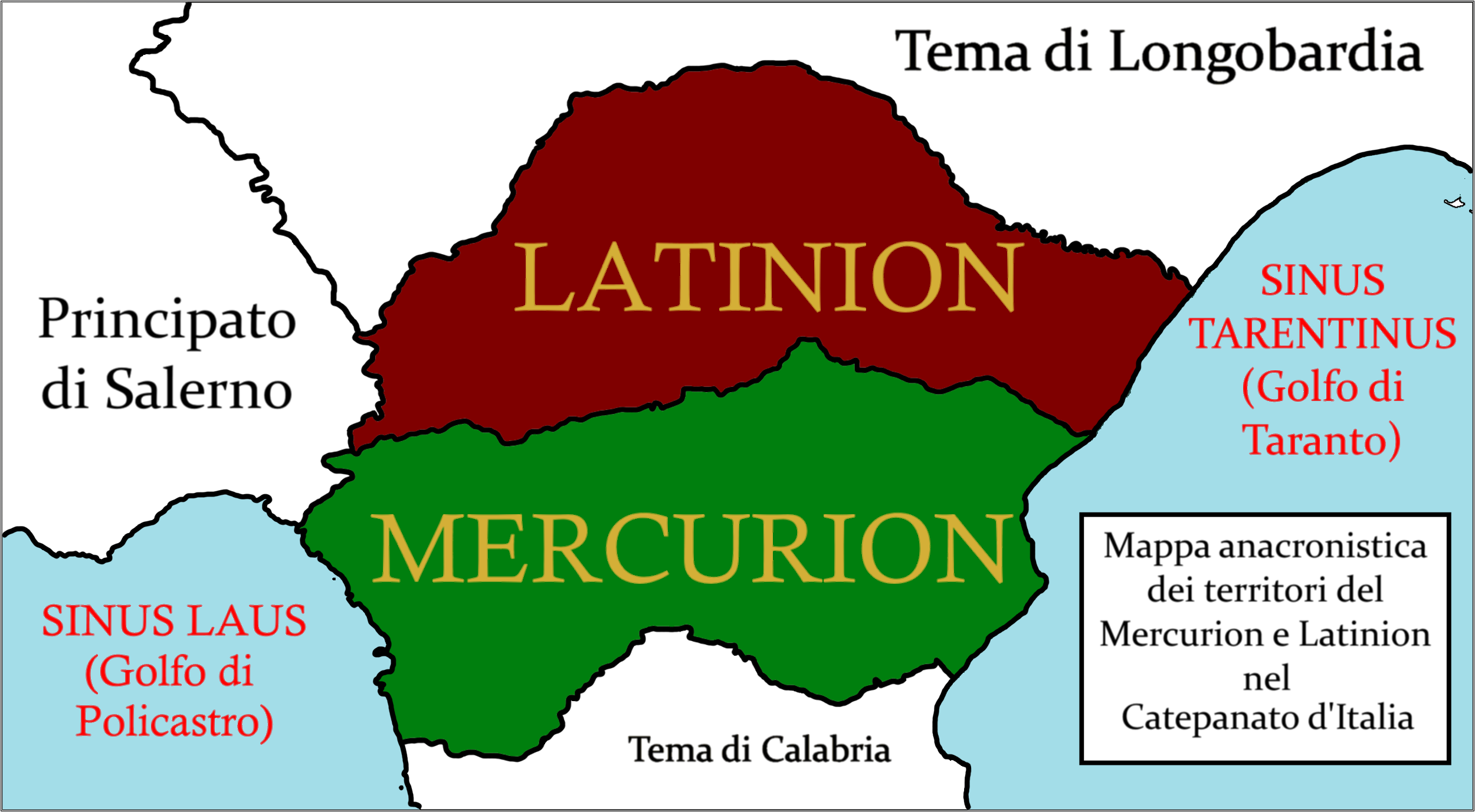
Anachronistic map representing the two territories of Mercurion and Latinion, in the Theme of Lucania.

In Calabria, he went to the Monastery of Mula, at Mount Mula (Monte La Mula ), one of the highest peaks of the Orsomarso mountains (1935 m). Here he became a monk, excelling in the virtues and in obedience, remaining there for six years.

Afterwards he departed together with the Hegumen of the monastery Christopher, and they made their way to the mountainous region of Merkourion (Note: See: (in Italian) Mercurion. Italian Wikipedia.) in northern Calabria, in the Pollino area of the Southern Apennines. This territory was an important center of monastic settlement which is referred to in several of the Vitae as the "New Thebaid", situated along the Calabrian-Lucanian border. Here they founded a new monastery, probably at Mormanno, living there in asceticism for another seven years.

Once more they left and moved on to Vena (modern Avena, Calabria) (Note: Avena, formerly an independent village, is now a frazione (municipal subdivision) of Papasidero, a commune in southern Italy.) to continue the spiritual struggle for another ten years. Here they built another monastery, which by the time of Hegumen Christopher's death had more than one-hundred monks in it. Leoluca himself lived the solitary life nearby at Mormanno, Calabria.

A little later, after the death of Abbot Christopher, Leoluca became abbot of the monastery of Mount Mula. According to tradition, God granted to him the gift of Wonderworking, and many faithful flocked to him to receive his blessing and be healed. The Venerable Luke was thought to have healed the sick, exorcized demons, raised paralytics, and guided the lost towards the path of salvation. He prayed without ceasing, and remained out in the cold up to twenty days, in order to intensify his ascetic struggle.

=== Departure ===
It is said that he lived the last days of his life in meditation, fasting and ecstatic raptures. In old age, he called the monks to come to him, and foretold his end. He delegated the responsibility of the position of Hegumen to the monk Theodore, and assigned the priest Euthymios as his assistant. Having received Holy Communion, the Venerable Luke fell asleep in peace and was buried in the church of the Blessed Theotokos.

== Veneration ==
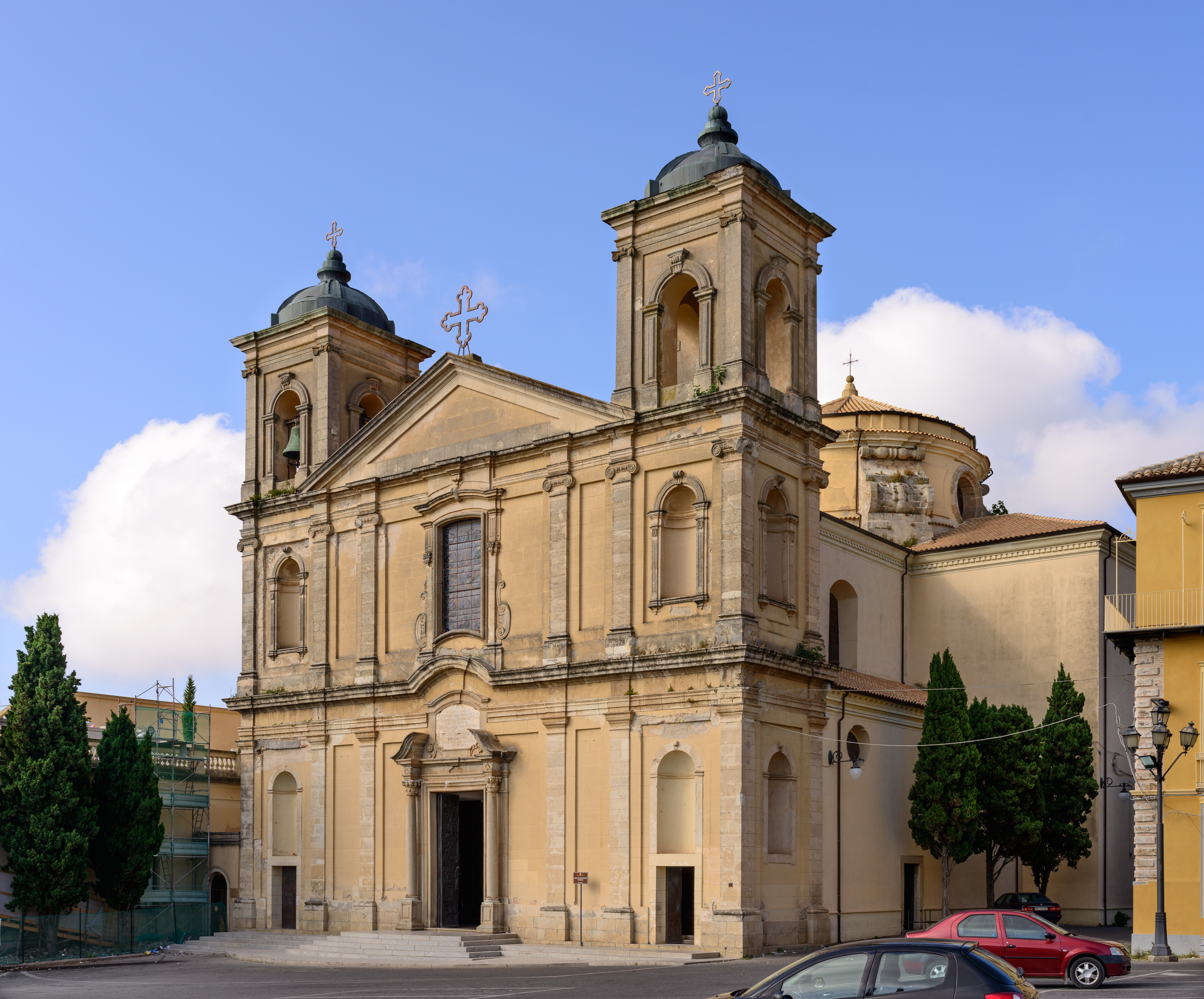
The cathedral of Santa Maria Maggiore and San Leoluca, in Vibo Valentia. (Note: The current church lies on the spot of a former Byzantine cathedral, probably of the ninth century, which was heavily damaged during the earthquakes of 1638 and 1659. In 1680, construction on the new church was begun, based on the designs of Francesco Antonio Curatoli.)

News of Leoluca's death spread slowly to Corleone, and it is only in the 13th century that there is evidence of a church dedicated to him in his birthplace. In 1420 there are also references to a Brotherhood of San Leoluca.

Leoluca's intercession is credited with saving the city of Corleone during an outbreak of the plague of 1575, and he was made the patron saint of that town. In 1624 he was made the patron saint of Vibo Valentia as well.

In addition, the apparition of Saint Leo Luke and Saint Anthony is credited with preventing a Bourbon invasion of Corleone on 27 May 1860.

In Vibo Valentia in Calabria, during his feast day on 1 March, the local fire brigade pay him homage by placing a crown of flowers at the feet of his statue which is located high on the façade of the Cathedral Church of Santa Maria Maggiore e San Leoluca, using a turntable ladder to perform the act.

=== Relics ===
Some historians assert that Leoluca was buried in Monteleone Calabro, now Vibo Valentia, in Calabria, in the church of Santa Maria Maggiore. (i.e. Cathedral Church of Santa Maria Maggiore e San Leoluca).

However, on Sunday 10 December 2006 the Italian daily newspaper La Sicilia, based in Catania, Sicily, ran a full page story stating that the relics of Leoluca had been found in the municipality of San Gregorio d'Ippona, about 2 km southeast of the city of Vibo Valentia. It stated that they were located in the grotto of the Church of Santa Ruba (La Chiesa di Santa Ruba), and that they were confirmed by paleontological analysis. According to professor Gregorio Vaianella, the church of Santa Ruba was dedicated to 'Our Lady of Health' (Madonna della Sanità). (Note: Thus confirming his hagiographical account that he was buried in a church of the Blessed Theotokos.)

== See also ==
- Byzantine monasticism
- Byzantine Rite
- Basilian monk

== Notes ==
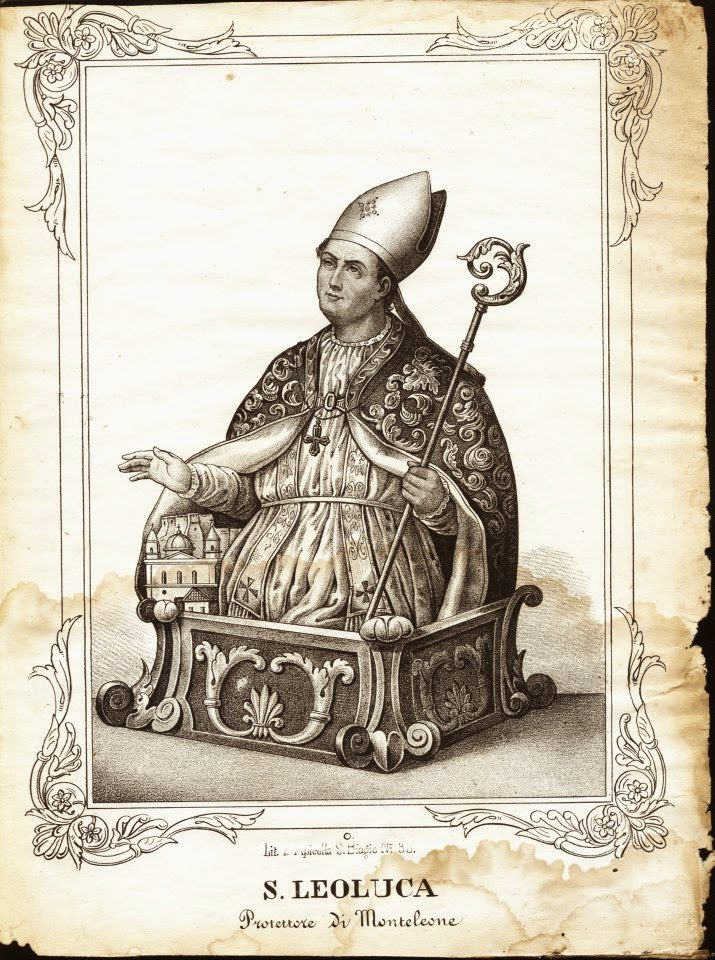
Vibo Valentia

== Sources ==
- March 1. Latin Saints of the Orthodox Patriarchate of Rome.
- Lynn White Jr. "The Byzantinization of Sicily." The American Historical Review. Vol. 42, No. 1 (Oct., 1936). p. 5.
- Rosemary Morris. Monks and Laymen in Byzantium, 843-1118. Cambridge University Press, 2003. 356pp.
- Robert E. Sinkewicz. "Italo-Greek". In: Richard Barrie Dobson. Encyclopedia of the Middle Ages, Volume 2 (K-Z). Eds.: André Vauchez, Michael Lapidge. Transl: Adrian Walford. Routledge, 2000. p. 974.
- Ann Wharton Epstein. "The Problem of Provincialism: Byzantine Monasteries in Cappadocia and Monks in South Italy." Journal of the Warburg and Courtauld Institutes. Vol. 42 (1979), pp. 28–46.
- Saint Leolucas of Corleone. Saints.SPQN.com. 25 February 2010.
- Luke of Sicily. OrthodoxWiki.

=== In Greek ===
- Great Synaxaristes: Ὁ Ὅσιος Λουκᾶς ὁ ἐκ Σικελίας. 1 Μαρτίου. ΜΕΓΑΣ ΣΥΝΑΞΑΡΙΣΤΗΣ.

=== In Latin ===
- Ottavio Gaetani. Vitae Sanctorum Siculorum ex antiquis Graecis Latinisque monumentis. Tomus Secundus. Gesuiti : Preposto generale, Gesuiti : Collegio Romano. 1657. pp. 80–84.
- "TESTIMONIUM CORILIONENSIUM DE CULTU ET ACTIS ANTIQUIS. (S. Leo Lucas Corilionensis, Abbas Mulensis in Calabria)." In: ACTA SANCTORUM, MARTII TOMUS PRIMUS. PARISIIS ET ROMÆ APUD VICTOREM PALMÉ, BIBLIOPOLAM. 1865. pp. 98–102.

=== In Italian ===
- Professor Maria Stelladoro. Leone Luca di Corleone (sec. IX-X) BHL 4842. ITALIA MEDIEVALE (Associazione Culturale Italia Medievale). 11 Aprile 2003.
- San Leone Luca (Leoluca) di Corleone. SANTI, BEATI E TESTIMONI.
- San Leoluca. Italian Wikipedia.
- SAN LEOLUCA. Enrosadira.
- Giorgio Leone. I BENI CULTURALI DEL VIBONESE. SITUAZIONE ATTUALE – PROSPETTIVE FUTURE. 27 – 28 – 29 DICEMBRE 1995.
- Trovate le spoglie di San Leoluca. LA SICILIA. DOMENICA 10 DICEMBRE 2006.
- Santa Ruba. San Gregorio D'ippona.

As of March 21, 2012, this article is derived in whole or in part from Orthodox Wiki. The copyright holder has licensed the content in a manner that permits reuse under CC BY-SA 3.0 and GFDL. All relevant terms must be followed. The original text was at "Luke of Sicily"
