= Luciano Leggio =

Italian criminal with murder conviction

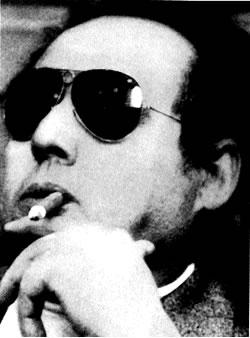
- Luciano Leggio at a 1974 court appearance
- Born: 6 January 1925; Corleone, Sicily
- Died: 15 November 1993 (aged 68); Nuoro, Sardinia, Italy
- Other name: Luciano Liggio
- Occupation: Mafia boss
- Status: Deceased (imprisoned from 1974)
- Allegiance: Corleone Mafia family
- Criminal charge: Murder
- Penalty: Life imprisonment

Luciano Leggio (Italian pronunciation: [luˈtʃaːno ˈlɛddʒo]; 6 January 1925 – 15 November 1993) was an Italian criminal and leading figure of the Sicilian Mafia. He was the capo of the Corleone Mafia family, and the founder of the Corleonesi, an alliance of Mafia families within the Mafia. He is universally known by the surname Liggio, a result of a misspelling in court documents in the 1960s.

As well as setting the Corleonesi on track to become the dominant Mafia clan in Sicily, he became infamous for avoiding convictions for a multitude of crimes, including homicide, before he was finally imprisoned for life in 1974.

== Early life ==
Leggio was one of ten children raised in extreme poverty on a small farm. He turned to crime in his teens and received his first conviction at the age of 18 for stealing corn. Upon completing his six-month sentence for the crime, Leggio murdered the man who had reported him to the police. In 1945, he was recruited by the Mafia boss of Corleone, Michele Navarra, to work as an enforcer and hitman. That same year, Leggio murdered a farm hand in order to take his job, then immediately took over the farm by demanding at gunpoint that the owner sign it over to him.

While behind bars in the late 1940s, he met Salvatore Riina, who was then aged 19 and starting a six-year sentence for manslaughter. The two eventually became accomplices in crime after Riina's release, as did two other young local criminals, Calogero Bagarella and Bernardo Provenzano.

On 10 March 1948, Placido Rizzotto, trade unionist, was kidnapped and murdered. The following year, two men confessed to helping Leggio kidnap Rizzotto, who shot the victim and dumped the body in a 15-metre-deep (49 ft) cavern. Leggio went into hiding, and was tried twice in absentia for Rizzotto's murder.

== Murder of Navarra ==
Michele Navarra tried to have Leggio killed in June 1958. Leggio was invited by Navarra to meet him at an estate but instead, he found fifteen armed men there. The hitmen hired for the task did a poor job and Leggio escaped with just minor injuries. The event left Leggio and his followers with the knowledge that they were as good as dead if they did not strike back soon.

A few weeks later, on 2 August 1958, Navarra and a fellow doctor (Giovanni Russo, who had nothing to do with criminal activities) were both shot to death on an isolated country road as they drove home in Navarra's Fiat 1100. The car was blocked on the open road by two other vehicles and riddled with submachine gun bullets. A few weeks later, on September 6, three men known as friends of Navarra were killed in a raid at Corleone. Reciprocal killings went on until 1963 and Leggio had to disappear, having been condemned for the killing of Navarra.

Leggio thus became the boss of the Corleone Mafia. Among Navarra's suspected killers were Bernardo Provenzano and Salvatore "Totò" Riina.

== Capture ==
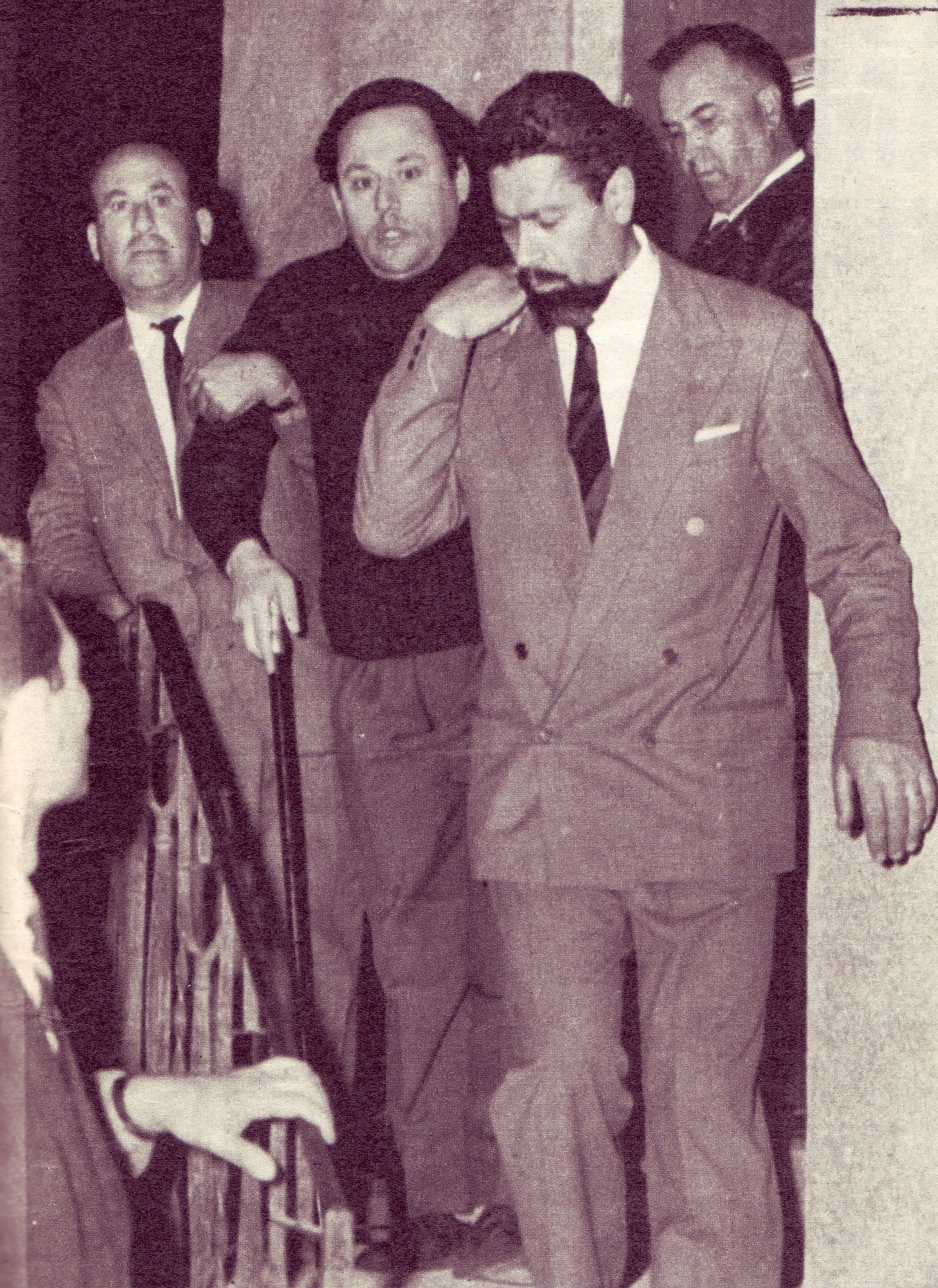
The 1964 arrest

Leggio was captured in Corleone on 14 May 1964, at the house of Leoluchina Sorisi, the former girlfriend of Rizzotto. Leggio was imprisoned at Ucciardone prison in Palermo, but in December 1968 he was acquitted for lack of evidence in the trial held in Catanzaro against the protagonists of the First Mafia War, and also of that held in Bari in 1969, in which he was accused of the murders that took place in Corleone starting in 1958.

The trial was regarded as farcical, with reports of blatant witness intimidation and evidence tampering. For example, fragments of a broken car light found at the Navarra murder scene which had been identified as belonging to an Alfa Romeo car owned by Leggio had, by the time of the trial, been replaced by bits of a broken light from a completely different make of car. The judges and prosecutors were sent anonymous letters threatening them with death.

== Fugitive again ==
Immediately after the trial, which ended in 1969, a determined Italian magistrate named Cesare Terranova appealed against Leggio's acquittal for the Navarra slaying. After hearing of his indictment to stand trial once more, Leggio checked into a private health clinic in Rome to have treatment for Pott's disease, which he had suffered from most of his life and for which he had to wear a brace. Leggio then relocated to Milan.

In February 1971, Leggio ordered the kidnapping for extortion of Antonino Caruso, son of the industrialist Giacomo Caruso, and also that of the son of the builder Francesco Vassallo in Palermo. Leggio was linked to the murder of the General Attorney of Sicily, Pietro Scaglione, who was shot dead on 5 May 1971 with his police bodyguard Antonino Lo Russo.

== Life imprisonment and death ==
Leggio was finally captured in Milan on 16 May 1974. He was sentenced to life imprisonment in 1975, and imprisoned at the Badu 'e Carros prison in Nuoro, Sardinia.

He is believed to have retained significant influence from behind bars, including commissioning the 1977 murder of Lieutenant Colonel Giuseppe Russo. Leggio had ordered the 1979 killing of Judge Terranova as a revenge for an insult made by the latter during interrogation in the 1960s; the murder was approved by the Sicilian Mafia Commission. Leggio was charged with ordering Terranova's murder, but was acquitted for lack of evidence, both in the first trial, which was held in Reggio Calabria in 1983, and three years later, in 1986, in the appeal process. By the end of the 1970s, his lieutenant Salvatore Riina was in control of the Corleonesi clan.

In the Maxi Trial of 1986/87, the jury rejected the prosecution's call for 15 years imprisonment for Leggio, and the jury acquitted him of four murders that prosecutors charged he had masterminded from his jail cell in Sardinia.

On 15 November 1993, he died in prison from a heart attack, aged 68. He is buried in Corleone.

== In popular culture ==
- Placido Rizzotto, a 2000 biopic by Pasquale Scimeca. Leggio is played by Vincenzo Albanese.
- L'ultimo dei corleonesi, a 2007 TV film. Leggio is played by Stefano Dionisi.
- Il Capo dei Capi, a 2007 Italian TV series. Leggio is played by Claudio Castrogiovanni.
- The Traitor, a 2019 Italian film by Marco Bellocchio. Leggio is played by Vincenzo Pirrotta.
- Dickie, John (2004). Cosa Nostra. A history of the Sicilian Mafia, London: Coronet, ISBN 0-340-82435-2
- Sterling, Claire (1990). Octopus. How the long reach of the Sicilian Mafia controls the global narcotics trade, New York: Simon & Schuster, ISBN 0-671-73402-4
- Stille, Alexander (1995). Excellent Cadavers. The Mafia and the Death of the First Italian Republic, New York: Vintage ISBN 0-09-959491-9
