= Francesco Bentivegna =

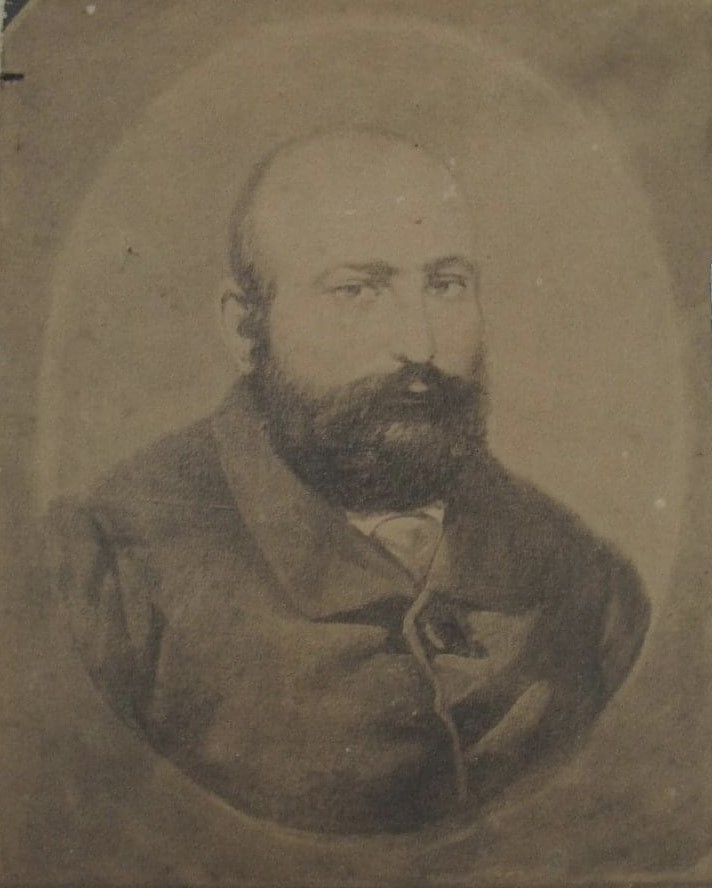
Francesco Bentivegna.

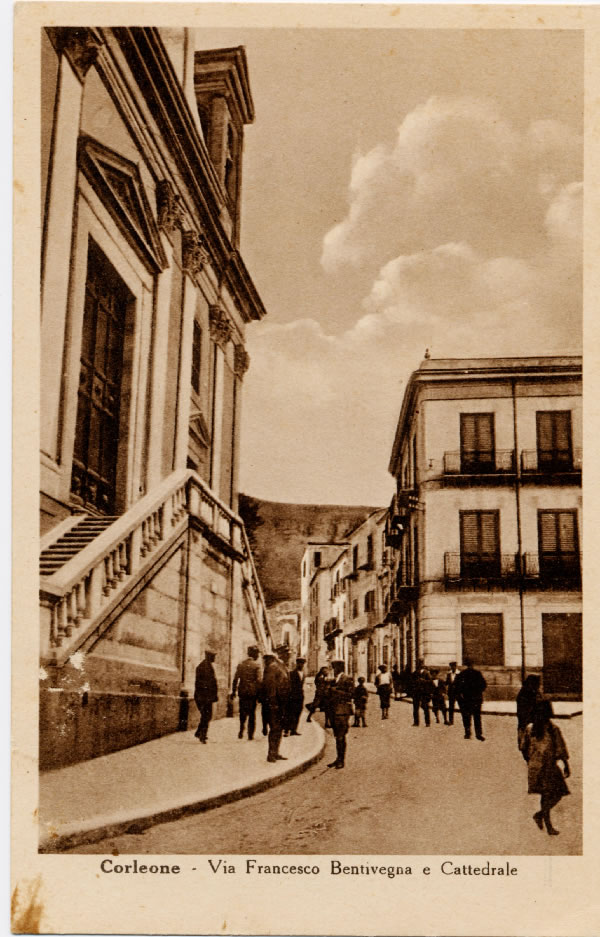
Via Baron Francesco Bentivegna in Corleone, Sicily.

Baron Francesco Bentivegna (4 March 1820 – 20 December 1856) was an Italian patriot, who led various revolts in Sicily against the Bourbon rulers between 1848 and 1856.

== Early life ==
Bentivegna was born in Corleone, Sicily, to Giliberto de Cordova, Marquis of Giostra Florence and Teresa de Cordova, from the Bourbon-Orleans. His parents originally wanted him to become a priest as the Bentivegna family was very involved with the Roman Catholic Church and regularly donated large sums of money. This is dated back to St Benedict.

== Struggle against foreign occupation ==
He initially fought against the Bourbons in Palermo in 1848. To honor his bravery, the provisional governor appointed Bentivegna to be the military governor of the Corleone district. He accepted the position but refused to be paid for his services. Within 16 months the Bourbon forces reoccupied Palermo. The Bourbon governor offered amnesty to the renegades if they would pledge fealty to the French rulers. Bentivegna refused to make the pledge. On 27 January 1850, he once again attempted a coup against the Bourbon government of Palermo.

Barely escaping, he managed to live more than two years as a wanted fugitive, continuing to organize the Italian revolutionaries. He was finally arrested on 25 February 1853 in the Albergheria quarter of Palermo. He was released on 25 July 1856 before his lawyers could plead his case in court.

After his release, Bentivegna deemed it was the right time for a full revolt of Italy from foreign domination. In 1856, with fellow revolutionary Salvatore Spinuzza, he attempted to create an uprising of the people. He organized squadre of peasants to attack Mezzojuso and Villafrati, while Spinuzza centered his activities in Cefalù. Giuseppe Mazzini promised to aid Bentivegna with his group, La Giovine Italia.

== Arrest and execution ==
Before the 1856 uprising in Mezzojuso could occur, he was betrayed by Ignazio Milone, a Corleonese who had been promised a knighthood and an annual salary of 300 ducats. Bentivegna was arrested on 2 December 1856 while hiding in a house in the Punzonotto Contrada of Corleone. After a summary process the next day, he was sentenced to death by firing squad. The execution took place on 20 December 1856 at Mezzojuso.

Bentivegna's death sentence was pronounced based on the charges for his arrest in 1853. But since he was released without having been given a trial at that time, his capital punishment has historically been considered illegal. Eyewitnesses claimed Bentivegna requested his estate be given to his mother, but this was prohibited by law since surviving males of the line inherited automatically.

== Fate of corpse ==
Following his execution by firing squad, Bentivegna's corpse was thrown into an ossuary, but was quickly, and secretly, removed and hidden.

On 23 June 1860, after Sicily had been liberated by Giuseppe Garibaldi, Bentivegna's body was transported to Corleone. One year later, wrapped in the Italian tricolor flag, he was entombed in the chapel of San Biagio (St. Blaise) in Cefalù, where a monument was erected in his honour.
