= Forza d'Agrò =

Forza d'Agrò Agrós (Greek)
- Comune
- Comune di Forza d'Agrò
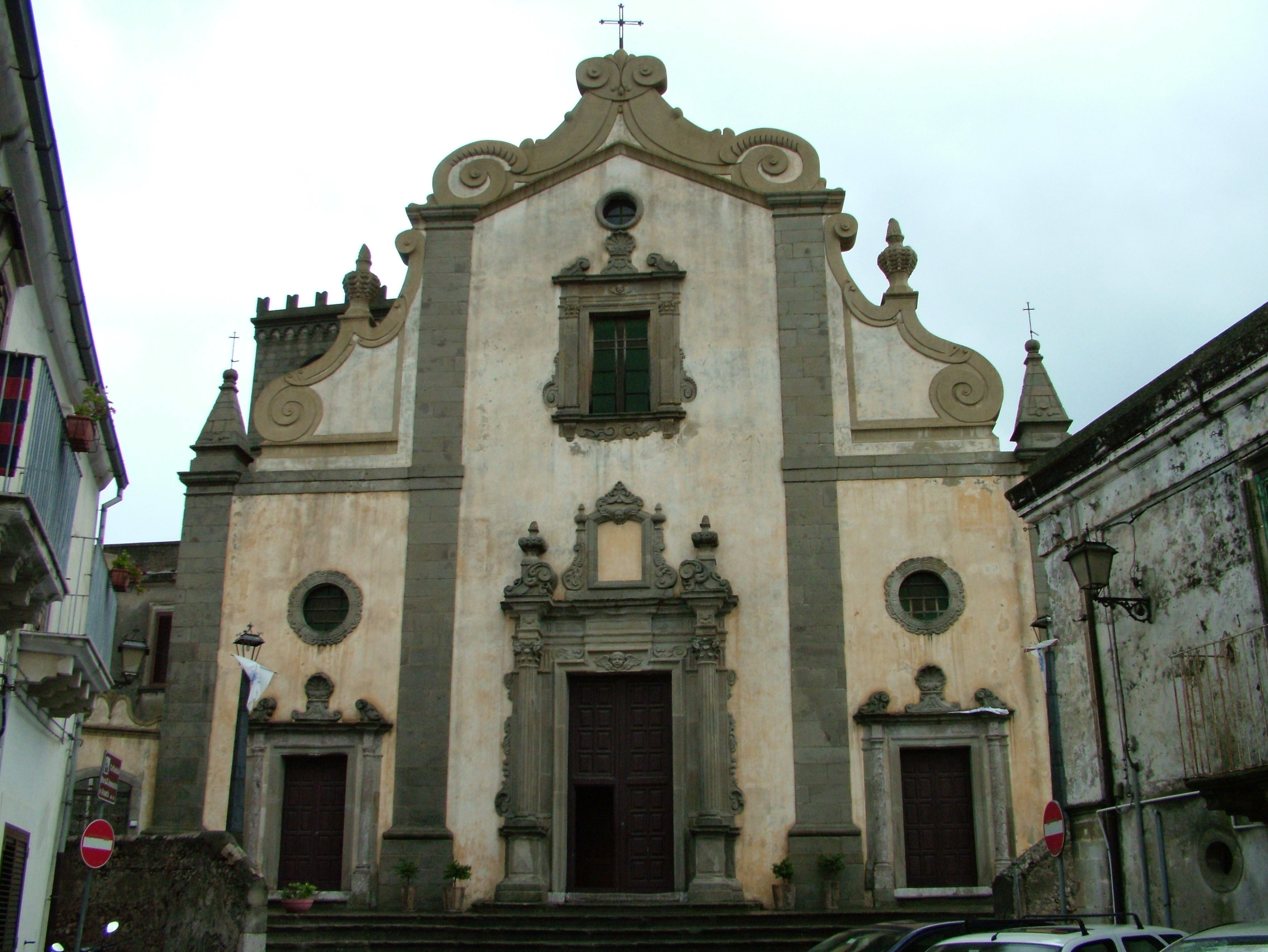
- Cathedral Santissima Annunziata of Forza d'Agrò

- Coat of arms

- Location within Italy Location within Sicily
- Coordinates: 37°55′N 15°20′E
- Country: Italy
- Region: Sicily
- Metropolitan city: Messina (ME)

Government
  - Mayor: Pasquale Fabio Di Cara

Area
  - Total: 11 km^{2} (4.2 sq mi)
- Elevation: 420 m (1,380 ft)

Population (31 August 2017)
  - Total: 894
  - Density: 81/km^{2} (210/sq mi)
- Demonym: Forzesi
- Time zone: UTC+1 (CET)
  - Summer (DST): UTC+2 (CEST)
- Postal code: 98030
- Dialing code: 0942
- Patron saint: Holy Crucifix
- Saint day: September 14
- Website: Official website

Forza d'Agrò is a town and comune in the Metropolitan City of Messina, Sicily, southern Italy.

Forza d'Agrò is on the lower peak of a small mountain, while on the higher peak that overlooks the town are the remains of a Norman castle.

== History ==
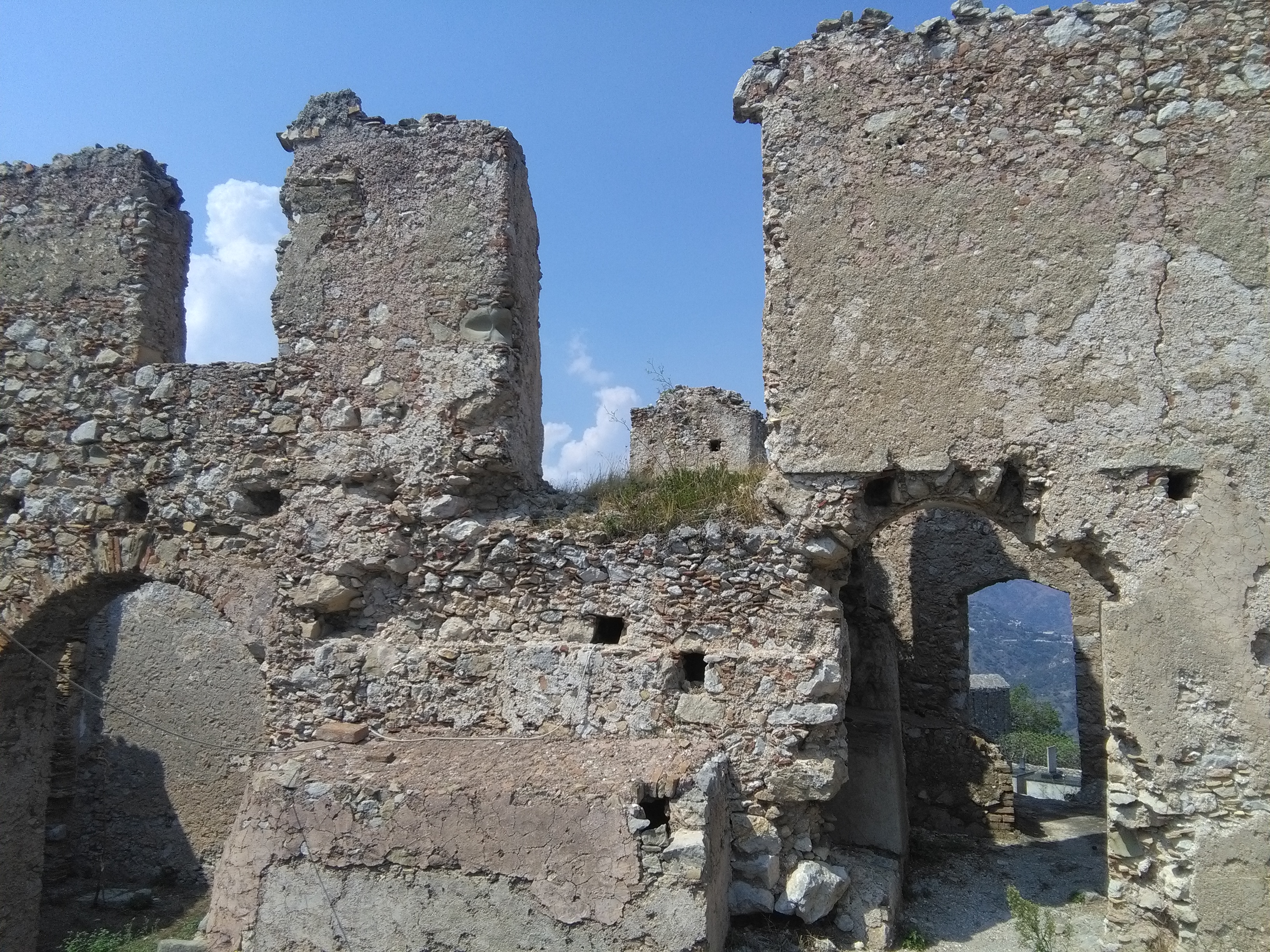
A section of the ruins of Castle Forza d'Agro built in the reign of King Roger I of Sicily

It is not certain if Forza d'Agrò area was first settled by the Sicani or by the Sicels. There may have been a village or commercial port called Phoinix, while further inland there was a small town named Kallipolis or Agrilla, which was eventually destroyed.

The first Greek settlers arrived between 8th century and the 5th century BC, giving the town the name Arghennon akron, meaning "Silver Promontory", in reference to the current Cape S. Alessio. Over time, Akron changed to Argon then to Agron and finally to Agrò. Scanty remains of a fort-like structure located at the top of the mountain indicate that Forza D'Agrò had once been a fortress.

After the Roman conquest in 135 BC the Greek toponym of "Arghennon" was replaced by "Agrillae" or "Agrille". The village and its suburbs within the margins of the River Agrò became known by the Latin name Vicus Agrillae.

The zone then came under the Byzantine domain which lasted from 536 AD to 827. During this period, the community adopted the Greek-oriental cult and the Monastery of the Church of S. Peter and Paul of Agrò was erected. In order to escape from foreign invasions the population moved more inland to Casale. In the 8th century, there were more frequent Saracen incursions, and perhaps during this period the Monastery d'Agrò was destroyed.

In the reign of Roger I of Sicily and his successors the Castle of Forza D'Agrò was built and the reconstruction of the Monastery of S. Peter and Paul took place. The first mention of "vicum Agrillae" occurs in a decree of Roger II issued in 1117. When the "vicus" became too small for the expanding population, the people moved higher up the mountain to an area known as Magghia. The name given to the village was Fortilicium d'Agrò (Fortezza d'Agrò in Italian, meaning "Fortress of Agrò") later abbreviated to Forza D'Agrò. Starting from the 14th century the village slowly took shape and has been conserved to the present day.

In the anti-Spanish revolution of 1674, Forza D'Agrò remained loyal to the Spanish crown and it was treated as a territorial conquest by the French. In the early 19th century British forces occupied the Castle of S. Alessio and the Castle of Forza D'Agrò to defend the area from Napoleonic attacks.

In the early 20th century many Forzesi emigrated to America.

In 1948, the hamlet of S. Alessio detached itself from Forza d'Agrò, becoming an autonomous comune.

The town, together with Savoca, was the location for the scenes set in Corleone of Francis Ford Coppola's The Godfather (1972); the town also features in the sequel, The Godfather Part II (1974).

== General and cited references ==
- Arcadipane, Girolamo (1991). Forza d'Agrò. Greco.
