= Bernardino Verro =

Sicilian politician (1866–1915)

- Born: 3 July 1866; Corleone, Kingdom of Italy
- Died: 3 November 1915 (aged 49); Corleone, Kingdom of Italy
- Occupations: Syndicalist and politician
- Known for: Socialist leader of the Fasci Siciliani; Mayor of Corleone; Murdered by the Sicilian Mafia

Bernardino Verro (Italian pronunciation: [bernarˈdiːno ˈvɛrro]; 3 July 1866 – 3 November 1915) was a Sicilian syndicalist and politician. He was involved in the Fasci Siciliani (Sicilian Leagues), a popular movement of democratic and socialist inspiration in 1891–1894, and became the first socialist mayor of Corleone in 1914. He was killed by the Mafia.

== Fasci Siciliani ==
Verro, at the time a low-level municipal bureaucrat with only an unfinished education and outraged by the injustices he witnessed around him, was involved in the foundation of the Fascio dei lavoratori of Corleone on 8 September 1892. At the age of 26, Verro became its president. The local Fascio in Corleone was one of the first and best-organized groups on the island. "Our Fascio has about six thousand members," he told the journalist Adolfo Rossi, in an interview for La Tribuna from Rome in the autumn of 1893. "Our women have understood the advantages of union among the poor, and now teach their children socialism."

Verro was sacked for his political beliefs when he became the leader of the Fascio. Contemporaries described him "as a bear of a man, energetic and short-tempered with an absolute devotion to his cause." Travelling by mule, he spread the message also in nearby towns. He was a charismatic speaker who addressed the people in the local dialect, and his influence was not limited to Corleone. He was involved in setting up Fasci in neighbouring towns and mediated conflicts.

At the Congress of the Fasci in Palermo on May 21–22, 1893, Verro was elected a member of the new Central Committee. In July 1893, he hosted a conference at Corleone that drafted model agrarian contracts for labourers, sharecroppers and tenants and presented them to the landowners. When they refused to negotiate, a strike against landowners and against state taxes broke out over a large part of western Sicily. The so-called Patti di Corleone, are considered by historians to be the first trade union collective contract in capitalist Italy.

== Involvement with the Mafia ==
In the summer of 1893, Corleone became the strategic centre of the peasant movement and the epicentre of the strike wave, thanks to Verro's charisma and to his hard-nosed choices, including a strategic alliance with a Mafia clan in Corleone and alliances with prominent Mafiosi in outlying towns, most notably Vito Cascioferro and Nunzio Giaimo in Bisacquino. The Mafiosi were sometimes needed to enforce flying pickets with credible threats of violence and to make the strike costly to landowners by destroying their property.

In order to give the strike teeth and to protect himself from harm, Verro became a member of a Mafia group in Corleone, the Fratuzzi (the Brothers). In a memoir written many years later, he described the initiation ritual he underwent in the spring of 1893: "[I] was invited to take part in a secret meeting of the Fratuzzi. I entered a mysterious room where there were many men armed with guns sitting around a table. In the center of the table there was a skull drawn on a piece of paper and a knife. In order to be admitted to the Fratuzzi, [I] had to undergo an initiation consisting of some trials of loyalty and the pricking of the lower lip with the tip of the knife: the blood from the wound soaked the skull."

However, during the great strike of the Fasci in September 1893, the Fratuzzi mobilized to boycott it, providing the necessary manpower to work on the lands that the peasants refused to cultivate. The Fratuzzi, headed by Giuseppe Battaglia, were mostly gabelloti – local power brokers that leased and managed the large estates from absentee landlords. After that, Verro broke away from the already uneasy alliance with the mafiosi, and – according to police reports – became their most bitter enemy. In a speech in 1902, Verro said that "as long as socialism has been preached, the lower forms of criminality have declined, and we hope that over time there will be a similar decline in the murders ordered by the alta Mafia".

== Arrests and convictions ==
Verro was arrested on 16 January 1894, after Prime Minister Francesco Crispi had ordered a crackdown on the Fasci. Together with other leaders of the Fasci Rosario Garibaldi Bosco, Nicola Barbato he tried to board the steamship Bagnara that was about to leave for Tunis. On 30 May 1894, the leaders of the movement were convicted; Giuseppe de Felice Giuffrida was sentenced to 18 years in jail and Garibaldi Bosco, Barbato and Verro to 12 years.

Verro was also sentenced by another Military Tribunal to 16 years, a penalty of 500 lire and three years of special surveillance, for his alleged involvement with the Lercara Friddi massacre on Christmas 1893, despite the fact that he had not been present when the violence broke out and that in fact he had actually tried to calm down local hotheads in the days before. After two years, in March 1896, he was released as the result of a pardon recognizing the excessive brutality of the repression.

In June 1896, just released from prison by amnesty, he formed a consumer cooperative, part of "La Terra" (The Earth), a federation bringing together all the farmers in the area of Corleone. But in September, the federation was dissolved by the prefect, because it was considered to be a surreptitious way to revive the Fasci. Verro was sentenced to six months' imprisonment and fined 100,000 lire for unlawful association. Convinced that in Sicily there was little space for political action, he decided to emigrate to the United States, to propagate socialism overseas. He settled in Buffalo, New York, where a small group of Sicilian socialists lived already. He only stayed two years and in the spring of 1898 he returned to Sicily, where he had to serve the six months in jail to which he had been sentenced.

== Farmer cooperatives and agrarian strikes ==
Once released, in January 1899, he started a newspaper — Lu viddanu (The Peasant), in Sicilian dialect — and established a consumer cooperative in Corleone involving some 800 heads of households that could buy basic necessities at a much lower price. In 1899, he also founded the "Zuccarrone Agricultural Brotherhood" (Fratellanza agricola Zuccarrone) to directly manage the 485 lots for the peasants of the Zuccarrone estate. The idea was to replace the old model of a single leaseholder (the gabelloto, often a Mafia boss) with a "collective leaseholder" through a peasant cooperative.

These endeavours accelerated when, in the fall of 1901, Sicilian peasants - following the example of numerous agrarian strikes that were affecting the whole of Italy - set off a wave of agrarian unrest. They were conscious of the fact that in a way they resumed "the march abruptly interrupted in 1894 by the repression of the Fasci." Just as the Fasci movement, one of the main goals of the 1901 strikes was to undermine the economic power of the gabelotti. In 1901 the association obtained the lease of the Zuccarrone estate for one year and in 1902 on a longer lease agreement.

In 1903, facing jail again for political reasons, Verro left Sicily for Marseille (France). One year later he went to Tunis, where a Sicilian community existed. There, he started Il Socialista, as the organ of the Federation of Socialist Sicilian Workers. He finally returned to Sicily in 1906.

Verro kept on organizing peasants and promoted the system of "collective renting" with other peasant leaders such as Lorenzo Panepinto from Santo Stefano Quisquina and Nicola Alongi from Prizzi which grabbed landholdings from the gabelloti that subleased plots to peasant at excessive or abusive rates and were often organised in Mafia-type brotherhoods such as the Fratuzzi, with which Verro had previously come into conflict. The cooperatives were not only means for political organisation but also of the modernisation of agriculture encouraging innovative techniques of cultivation and the processing of agricultural products and livestock.

Cooperatives such as "The Earth" and the "Zuccarrone Agricultural Brotherhood" were rehearsals for the birth of the cooperative "Agricultural Union" (Unione Agricola), founded on 2 June 1906. This was the instrument through which Verro and other socialist leaders tried to answer the needs of the rural poor and free them from feudal slavery. The Union took advantage of new agrarian legislation passed by the Prime Minister Sidney Sonnino (Law no. 100 of 1906), which made cooperatives eligible for credit, to consolidate and extend the model of "collective leaseholds." In quick succession, the cooperative obtained the lease of other estates. Overall, in 1910 the cooperative came to manage approximately 2,500 hectares of land, divided into 1,289 shares.

== Mayor of Corleone ==
Relations between Verro, landowners and his former allies from the Fratuzzi became ever more strained. In 1910, Verro launched a tax strike against the corrupt mayor of Corleone and denounced the affiliation between the Mafia and the Catholics. On 6 November 1910, the day of the municipal elections, he survived an attempt on his life. Two gunshots grazed his left wrist and made his hat fly, but he survived. The bullets fired at him stank of "Mafia and incense", Verro said. The fear for his life increased when his comrade Panepinto was killed by the Mafia in May 1911.

Failing in the direct attempt on his life, his adversaries tried to infiltrate the successful "Agricultural Union" cooperative. The treasurer was arrested for fraud and counterfeit bills, but claimed he was working on Verro's orders. Verro was arrested on 21 September 1912, while attending the national convention of the League of Cooperatives in Rome. He remained in prison for ten long months.

After the introduction of universal male suffrage in 1912, Verro became the Socialist candidate on the list for the June 1914 municipal elections, and achieved a resounding success: he was elected and the Socialist Party won 24 seats out of 30 on the city council. He became the first Socialist mayor of Corleone, but it did not last long. On 3 November 1915, a Mafia assassin killed him with eleven shots, while he was returning home. The actual killer was never identified. Suspicions fell on the Fratuzzi group led by Michelangelo Gennaro.

== See also ==
- List of victims of the Sicilian Mafia
