= Savoca =

- Comune
- Comune di Savoca
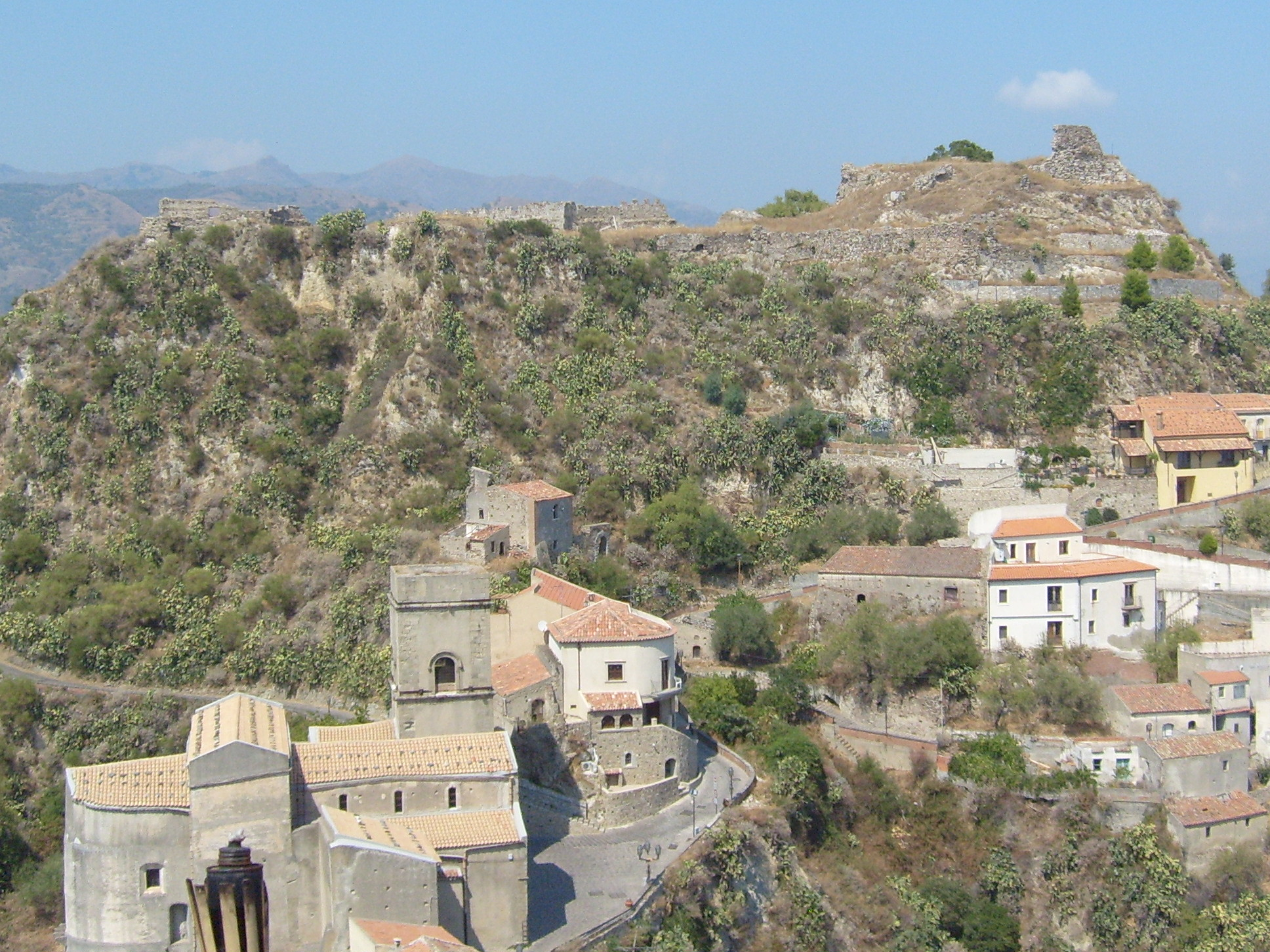
- Savoca - Pentefur Castle

- Location of the municipality of Savoca within the metropolitan city of Messina

- Location within Italy Location within Sicily
- Coordinates: 37°57′21″N 15°20′22″E
- Country: Italy
- Region: Sicily
- Metropolitan city: Messina (ME)
- Frazioni: Botte, Cantidati, Contura, Cucco, Mancusa, Mortilla, Rina, Rogani, Romissa, Scorsonello, San Francesco di Paola

Government
  - Mayor: Massimo Stracuzzi

Area
  - Total: 9.08 km^{2} (3.51 sq mi)
- Elevation: 330 m (1,080 ft)

Population (30 November 2025)
  - Total: 1,750
  - Density: 193/km^{2} (499/sq mi)
- Demonym: Savocesi
- Time zone: UTC+1 (CET)
  - Summer (DST): UTC+2 (CEST)
- Postal code: 98038
- Dialing code: 0942
- Patron saint: Saint Lucia
- Saint day: 13 December
- Website: Official website

Savoca (Sicilian: Sàvuca) is a comune (municipality) in the Province of Messina in the Italian region Sicily, located about 170 kilometres (110 mi) east of Palermo and about 30 kilometres (19 mi) southwest of Messina.

Savoca borders the following municipalities: Casalvecchio Siculo, Forza d'Agrò, Furci Siculo, Sant'Alessio Siculo, Santa Teresa di Riva. It is one of I Borghi più belli d'Italia ("The most beautiful villages of Italy").

The town, together with Forza d'Agrò, was the location for the scenes set in Corleone of Francis Ford Coppola's The Godfather (1972). Bar Vitelli in Savoca, which is still a functioning establishment, was featured in the motion picture as the place where Michael Corleone asked Apollonia's father to meet his daughter.

== Gallery ==
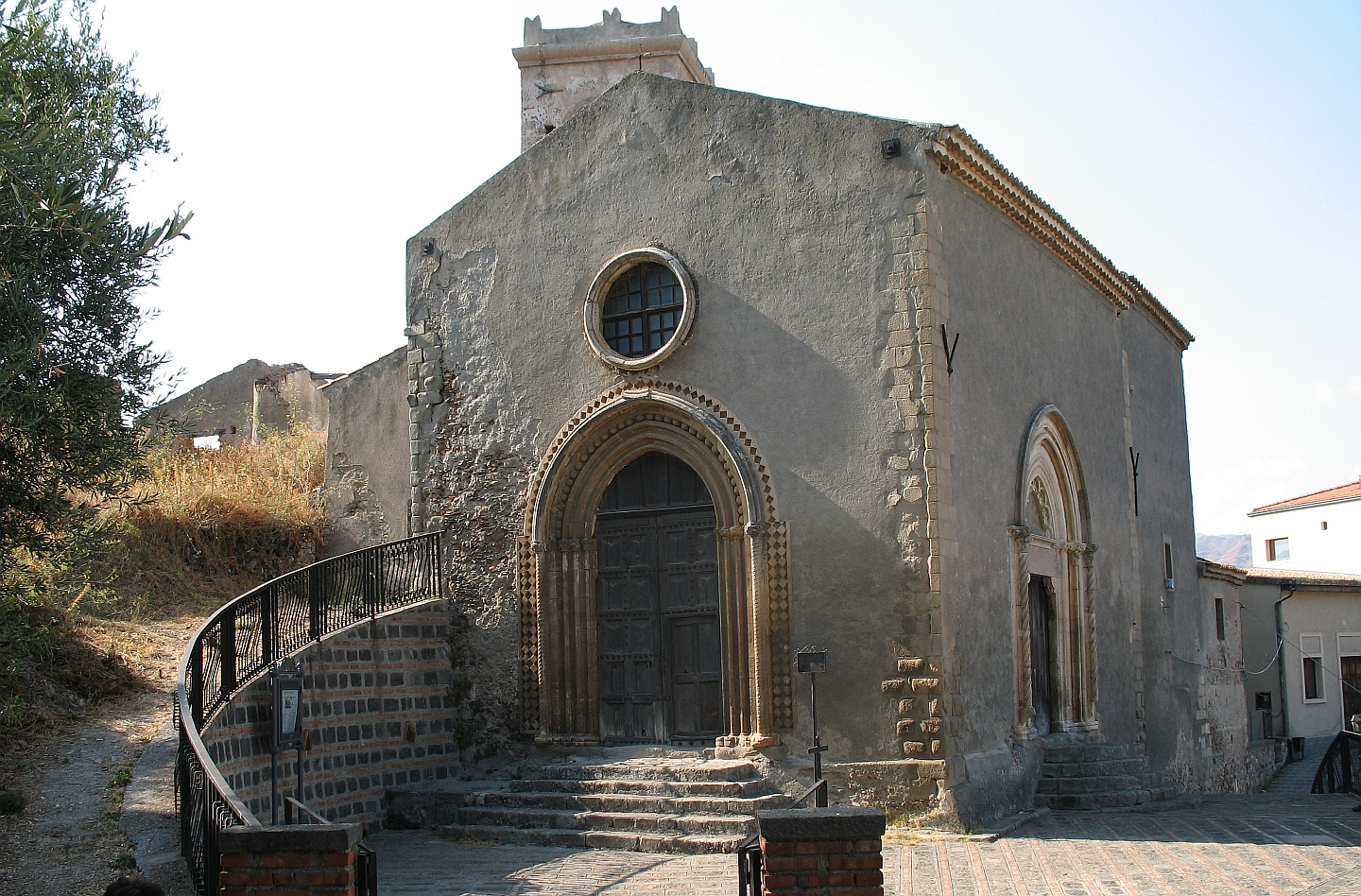
San Michele Church

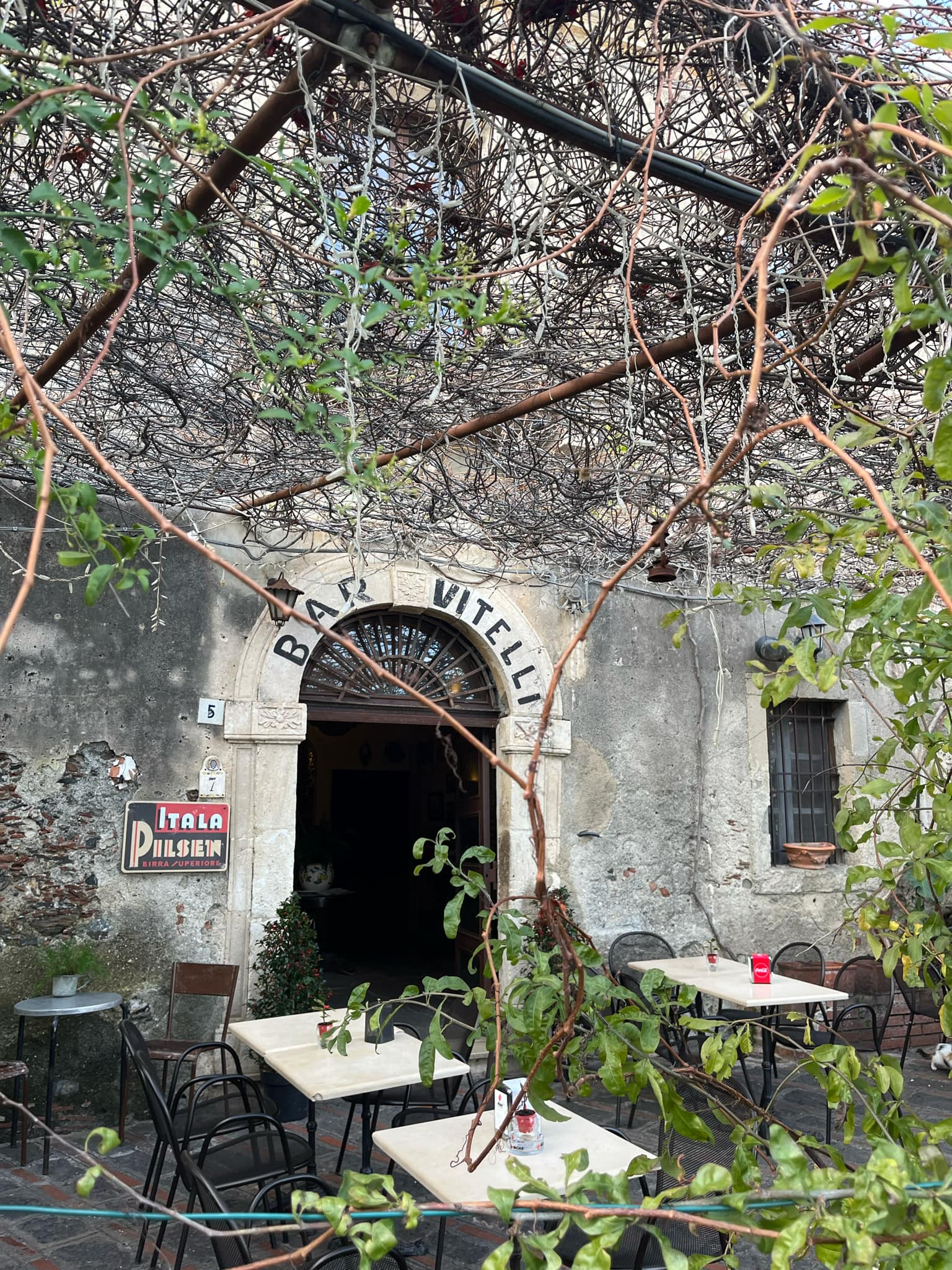
Bar Vitelli featured in The Godfather
