= Bernard of Corleone =

Sicilian Franciscan

Saint Bernardo da Corleone OFMCap
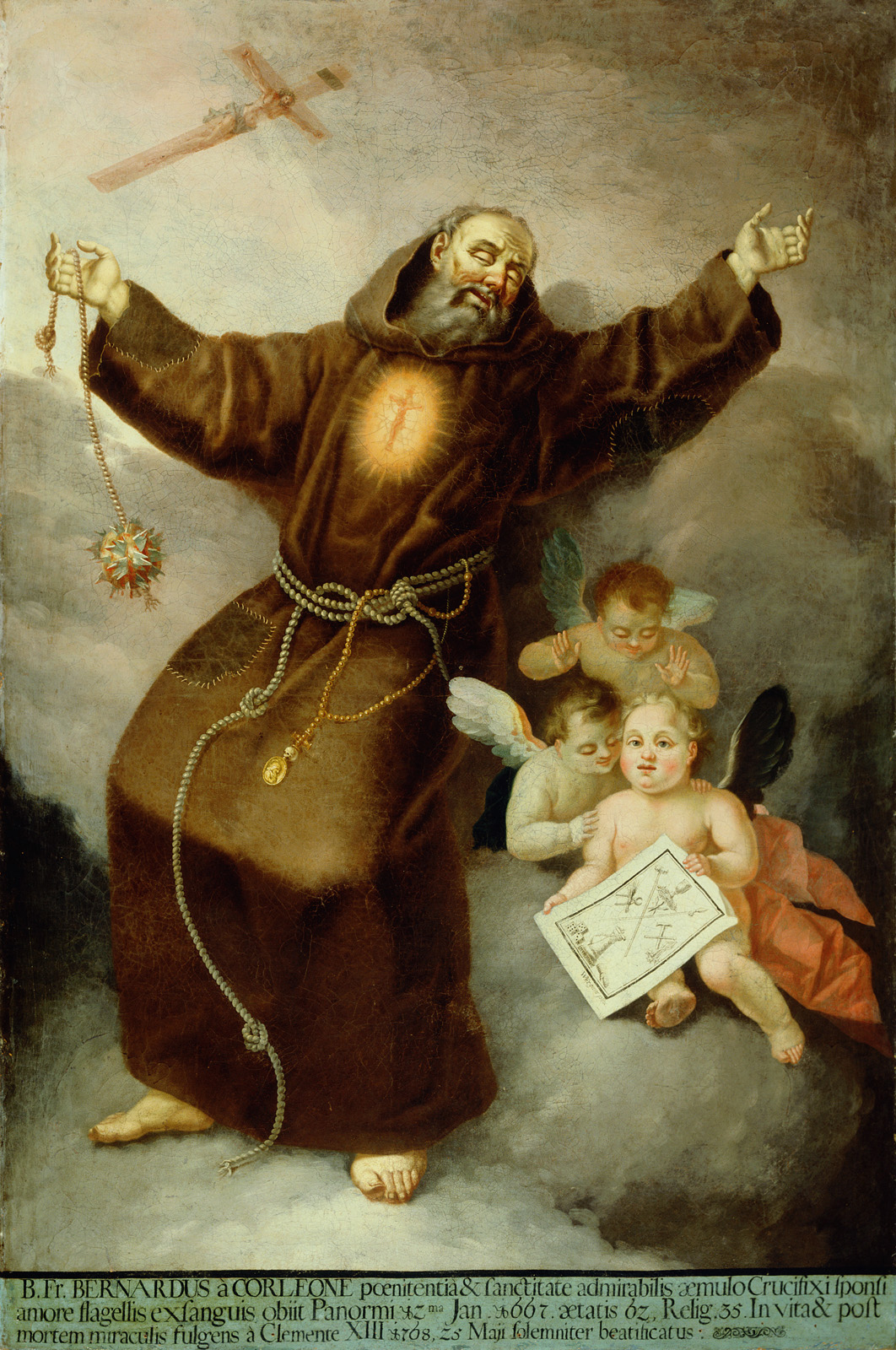
- Born: 6 February 1605; Corleone, Sicily, Kingdom of Sicily
- Died: 12 January 1667 (aged 61); Palermo, Sicily, Kingdom of Sicily
- Venerated in: Roman Catholic Church
- Beatified: 15 May 1768, Saint Peter's Basilica by Pope Clement XIII
- Canonized: 10 June 2001, Saint Peter's Square by Pope John Paul II
- Feast: 12 January
- Attributes: Franciscan habit
- Patronage: Mafia victims, expectant mothers

Bernardo da Corleone (born Filippo Latini, 6 February 1605 – 12 January 1667) was a Sicilian Capuchin friar.

He was a cobbler like his father until the latter died and he became a violent-tempered soldier who was quick to challenge to a duel those who offended him or the causes he believed in. But one duel went too far and he almost killed his opponent; he fled to the Franciscans in Palermo where he experienced a radical conversion and repentance for his previous life. Pope John Paul II canonized him 10 June 2001.

== Life ==
Filippo Latini was born in 1605 in Corleone as the third of six children to Leonardo and Francesca Latini; he was baptized just hours after his birth. His brothers and sisters were pious; one brother became a priest. Filippo had no formal schooling.

His father was a shoemaker and Latini learned the trade from him. Leonardo was so compassionate that he opened his home to the poor to wash and to be fed. The death of his father in March 1620 prompted Filippo to continue on in his profession for a while to support his mother, but he soon left to become a soldier on 1 May 1618. He took up fencing and became quite skilled. But he possessed a boiling temper and was quick to challenge men to a duel. His single fault — according to two witnesses during the beatification trials — was that "he was quick to draw his sword at the slightest provocation". His life was not noted for its moral content and he had quite a formidable reputation for that reason.

Latini was not that devout but he would defend old people and other helpless and defenseless persons against violence. He made frequent visits to a local crucifix and ensured that a lamp be kept burning before it; he was a devotee of Francis of Assisi. In the summer of 1624 he became involved in a duel which cost his opponent, the professional assassin Vito Canino, his arm. This incident was something that a large number of people witnessed and it caused an uproar which saw him nicknamed as "the finest blade in Sicily". To escape from the man's avengers he sought refuge with the Order of Friars Minor Capuchin for this duel had shaken him to the core. He later begged forgiveness to his opponent who befriended him after their differences were resolved.

During his time with the friars, he began to reflect on his life and to repent his life of anger and violence. He appealed for admission to the order as a religious and on 13 December 1632 entered their novitiate at Caltanissetta where he received the habit and the religious name Bernardo. His devotion became severe: he scourged himself seven times a week. His sleep was limited to three hours a night on a narrow board with a block of wood under his head to act as a pillow. He fasted for the most part on bread and water. He would wear the most worn habit available and slept in the most uncomfortable cell in the house. One result of this was that he suffered from rheumatism for much of his later life. He worked long hours and had a special concern for the sick; he ended up growing into a man known for his gentleness and compassion.

He lived a simple life, moving from one friary to another in the province. Latini was stationed in Corleone (1635–36) before being transferred to Bivona (1636–37) and Castronovo (1637–38). In Castronovo he used to go through the streets with a large pot on his shoulders to give minestrone to the poor. He was then transferred to Castelvetrano (1638–39) and Sambuca (1639–40) which lasted just over a decade. He then moved to Bisaquino (1640–41) and to Ciminna (1641–42) before being moved to Chiusa (1642–43) and then to Castronovo (1643–44) once again. Latini was then sent to Agrigento (1644–46) and then returned to Castronovo (1646–47) before setting off for Caltabellotta (1647–48) and then to Burgio (1648–50) before going back to Chiusa (1650–51). He was then sent to Partinico (1651–52). He spent the last fifteen years of his life in Palermo. In the meantime he met his former opponent and now-friend Vito Canino in 1654 and then twice more in 1659 and 1663.

Bernard possessed a strong devotion to the Madonna and encouraged others in this devotion. His biographers claim that the Blessed Mother appeared to him and placed the Infant Jesus in his arms. It is also claimed that she gave him knowledge of the date of his death four months in advance. In the friaries he served as either a cook or assistant cook but towards the end of his life dealt with washing and managing the clothes of his compatriots.

He died in Palermo on 12 January 1667 at 2 pm after having been moved to the convent's hospital wing on 7 January; his funeral procession was extensive due to the fame he had acquired during his life. On his deathbed he kept repeating: "Let's go" in anticipation of his dies natalis (birth into heaven). Numerous miracles reported to have occurred at his grave were recorded.

== Veneration ==
The beatification process opened in Palermo in an informative process that began in 1673 and concluded sometime later before an apostolic process was opened in 1681 and closed at the end of the decade on 16 December 1689. The formal introduction to the cause came under Pope Benedict XIII on 18 December 1725 and Latini became titled as a Servant of God as a result of this. The confirmation of his heroic virtue allowed for Pope Clement XIII to title him as Venerable on 2 February 1762. The same pope beatified him on 29 April 1768.

The cause for Bernard's sainthood was formally opened on 11 December 1773. One final miracle was needed for him to be canonized as a saint and one such was investigated in its diocese of origin; the Congregation for the Causes of Saints reviewed it and validated the process on 22 May 1998. The medical panel of experts approved this miracle on 12 May 1999 as did the theologians on 24 September 1999 and the C.C.S. on 21 March 2000. Pope John Paul II approved this miracle on 1 July 2000 and formalized the date for sainthood in a consistory on 13 March 2001. John Paul II canonized Latini as a saint on 10 June 2001 in Saint Peter's Square.
