= Mormanno =

- Comune
- Comune di Mormanno
- Coat of arms

- Location within Italy Location within Calabria
- Coordinates: 39°53′N 15°59′E
- Country: Italy
- Region: Calabria
- Province: Cosenza (CS)

Government
  - Mayor: Giuseppe Regina

Area
  - Total: 78.88 km^{2} (30.46 sq mi)
- Elevation: 850 m (2,790 ft)

Population (31 December 2017)
  - Total: 2,955
  - Density: 37.46/km^{2} (97.03/sq mi)
- Demonym: Mormannesi
- Time zone: UTC+1 (CET)
  - Summer (DST): UTC+2 (CEST)
- Postal code: 87026
- Dialing code: 0981
- Patron saint: St. Roch, Madonna dell'Assunta
- Saint day: August 16
- Website: Official website

Mormanno (Calabrian: Murmànnu) is a town and comune in the province of Cosenza in the Calabria region of southern Italy. It is located in the heart of the National Park of Pollino, near the course of the Lao River.

It is home to a Cathedral in Neapolitan-Baroque style, built in the 18th century.

== Twin towns ==
- Savigliano, Italy
