= Placido Rizzotto =

Italian trade unionist

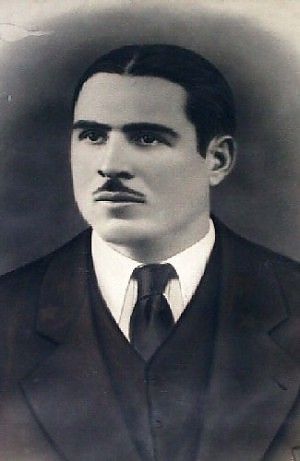
- Born: 2 January 1914; Corleone, Sicily
- Disappeared: 10 March 1948 (aged 34)
- Died: 10 March 1948 (aged 34); Rocca Busambra, Sicily
- Cause of death: Murdered
- Body discovered: 7 July 2009; Rocca Busambra

Placido Rizzotto (Italian pronunciation: [ˈplaːtʃido ritˈtsɔtto]; 2 January 1914 – 10 March 1948) was an Italian partisan, socialist peasant and trade union leader from Corleone, who was kidnapped and murdered by Sicilian Mafia boss Luciano Leggio on 10 March 1948. Before he was killed, Rizzotto was engaged in activism with farm laborers, trying to help them take over unfarmed land on large estates in the area. A 12-year-old shepherd, Giuseppe Letizia, witnessed Rizzotto's murder and was killed the following day with a lethal injection, made by Michele Navarra, a qualified physician and Mafia doctor. In the 1960s, Leggio was acquitted twice of Rizzotto's murder due to lack of evidence.

== Discovery of body and aftermath ==
Over 60 years after his death, remains were found on 7 July 2009, on a cliff in Rocca Busambra near Corleone, and on 9 March 2012, a DNA test, compared with one extracted from his father Carmelo Rizzotto, long dead and exhumed for this purpose, confirmed the identity of remains as those of Placido Rizzotto following a long and difficult investigation conducted by the State Police at the service of the PS Commissariat of Corleone. On 16 March 2012, the Council of Ministers announced a State Funeral would be held for Rizzotto, which took place in Corleone on 24 May 2012, attended by Italian President Giorgio Napolitano.

A biopic of Placido Rizzotto was made by Pasquale Scimeca, released in 2000.

== See also ==
- Il Capo dei Capi
- List of solved missing person cases (pre-1950)
- List of victims of the Sicilian Mafia
