= Corleone =

Corleone Cunigghiuni / Curliuni (Sicilian)
- Comune
- Città di Corleone
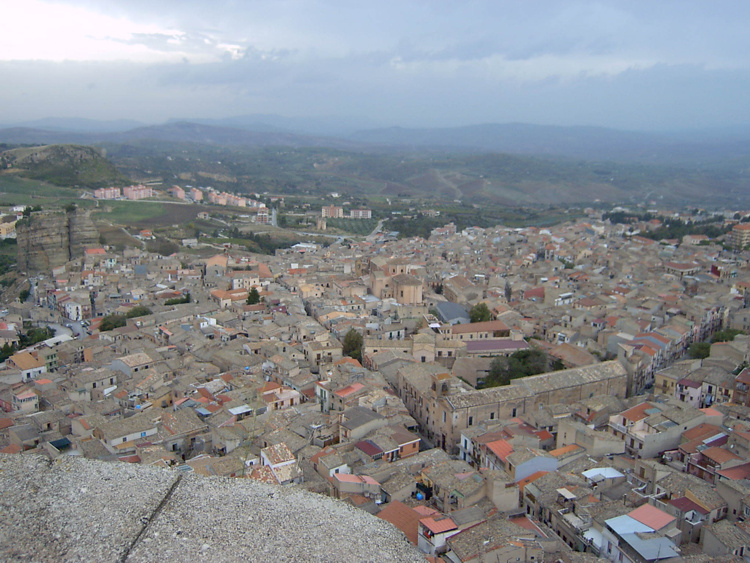

- Coat of arms
- Motto(s): Animosa Civitas Corleonis (Latin for "The courageous city of Corleone")
- Corleone within the Metropolitan City of Palermo

- Location within Italy Location within Sicily
- Coordinates: 37°49′N 13°18′E
- Country: Italy
- Region: Sicily
- Metropolitan city: Palermo (PA)
- Frazioni: Ficuzza, Contrada Belvedere, Contrada Chiosi, Contrada Giammaria

Government
  - Mayor: Nicolò Nicolosi

Area
  - Total: 229.45 km^{2} (88.59 sq mi)
- Elevation: 600 m (2,000 ft)

Population (1 January 2021)
  - Total: 10,694
  - Density: 46.607/km^{2} (120.71/sq mi)
- Demonym: Corleonese(i)
- Time zone: UTC+1 (CET)
  - Summer (DST): UTC+2 (CEST)
- Postal code: 90034
- Dialing code: 091
- Patron saint: St. Leoluca
- Saint day: 1 March
- Website: Official website

Corleone (Italian: [korleˈoːne]; Sicilian: Cunigghiuni [kʊnɪɟˈɟuːnɪ] or Curliuni [kʊɾlɪˈuːnɪ]) is a town and comune of roughly 11,158 inhabitants in the Metropolitan City of Palermo, in Sicily, Southern Italy.

The town is located in the central part of the Sicilian region, in a mountainous inland area at 542 meters (1,778 ft) above the sea level, protected by a crown of carbonate rock promontories; Rocca di Maschi, Castello Soprano and Castello Sottano. The municipality has an area of 22,912 hectares (56,620 acres) with a population density of 49 inhabitants per square kilometer.

The area on which Corleone stands has an ancient history, with the first human settlements dating back to the first phase of the Neolithic, in the 6th millennium BC.

The town's altitude and its location in a valley surrounded by hills halfway between Palermo and Agrigento gave Corleone a defensive and strategic advantage over the centuries. In fact, its position allowed to control important communication routes between the coastal areas and the Sicilian hinterland, and the natural protections fortified its defense.

There are several historical theories regarding the origins of the town's foundation. One of the most accredited sources dates it back to the 9th century AD, during the Muslim rule of Sicily. However, archaeological excavations conducted in the late 1990s show that the urban layout dates back to earlier times. According to some sources, the town was founded by Ancient Greek colonists and was a polis called Schera. Recent finds suggest the original layout dates back to prehistoric times.

Corleone was a central place in the history of Cosa Nostra, the Sicilian Mafia, which established itself in Sicily as a rural phenomenon in the late 19th century. The Mafia arose from the growing power of the gabellotti, individuals who had obtained concessions on lands belonging to the Sicilian aristocracy thanks to the abolition of feudal privileges in 1812, which caused the Sicilian nobles to abandon the countryside and return to the cities. The gabellotti paid to administer the lands, then divided them into lots and subleased them to peasants and laborers, who were treated like serfs, and their claims were violently repressed with the help of bandits. The institutional weakness following the Unification of Italy in 1861 allowed this new organization, formed by the union of landed exploiters and the rural criminals, and which would ultimately become the Mafia, to gain ever greater control over the rural areas.

The Corleone Mafia Family originated in the early 20th century and was most likely founded by Angelo Gagliano, a Corleone native with a criminal record and known for his violent nature, who later became the first boss of Corleone. Like other mafia clans, the Corleone Family was originally made up of gabellotti and cattle thieves.

The trade unionist and later mayor of Corleone, Bernandino Verro, firmly opposed the advance of the Mafia and fought hard to ensure respect for farmers' rights, agricultural cooperation, and the fair redistribution of landed estates. In 1915, he was killed by an unidentified hitman, on the orders of the mafia boss Angelo Gagliano, who had already attempted to assassinate him in 1910. Verro was the first mayor killed by the Sicilian Mafia.

After World War II, trade unionist Placido Rizzotto led a peasant movement in Corleone for the occupation of uncultivated lands, in order to counter the power of the Mafia and its land-owning management of the territory. This made him a target for the town's clans, particularly for clan leader Michele Navarra, who saw the trade unionist as a threat to his power and control. Rizzotto was kidnapped and assassinated on March 10, 1948. A local shepherd boy, Giuseppe Letizia, was also killed. He had accidentally witnessed the murder, becoming an inconvenient eyewitness for the mafia.

In the 1960s, the Corleone Mafia family became increasingly powerful under the leadership of Luciano Leggio, who stood out for his ruthless ways. The Corleonesi, an alliance of Mafia families led by Corleone mafiosi, led Cosa Nostra in the 1980s and was the most violent faction ever to take control of the organization.

Corleone is also the birthplace of several fictional characters in Mario Puzo's 1969 novel The Godfather, including the eponymous Don Vito (Andolini) Corleone.

== History ==
=== Etymology ===
The etymology of the name is uncertain, undergoing various modifications from the Ancient Greek Kouroullounè to the Siculo-Arabic Qurlayun of the Emirate of Sicily, from Latin Curilionum to the Norman Coraigliòn, from the Aragonese Conillon, Coniglione from which the Sicilian Cunigghiuni originated. The modern name originates from 1556.

Another belief is that the name derives from an Arab fighter named Kurliyun (cf. Coeur Leon, "Lionheart"), who conquered it for the Aghlabids in 840.

=== Antiquity ===
The territory of Corleone has been inhabited since prehistoric times. Recent research has identified several settlements distributed around two main areas: Pietralunga and The Old One (La Vecchia). This name refers to a mountain that rises to about 1,000 metres (3,300 ft), and is about 2 kilometres (1.2 mi) from today's town. The site of Pietralunga was occupied from the final Neolithic Period to the Bronze Age (the presence of a glass bell decorated in pointillé) while the site of The Old One has been inhabited since the Middle Ages (the presence of an imposing castle with towers has recently been identified). However, the biggest part of the settlement was built in the archaic and classical period. "A few materials relating to the Hellenistic period found at the site have supported the identification of the ancient town situated on the Old One with the ancient town of Schera, cited by Cicero, Cluverio and Ptolemy, although the archaeological remains on which this theory is based are still too unstable. (D'Angelo - Spatafora).

=== Middle Ages ===
In 840, Corleone was conquered by the North African Aghlabids during the Muslim conquest of Sicily. It was during the Muslim occupation that it gained economic, military and strategic importance. In 1080 the city was conquered by the Normans, and in 1095 it was annexed to the Diocese of Palermo. Even in the 1170s it was recorded that over 80% of the population of the area was Muslim and that many bore Arabo-Islamic names derived from Greek. There was also a mosque, called Masgid al-Barid, within the town. Following the large-scale anti-Muslim attacks by Lombard settlers in eastern Sicily in 1161 led by future King of Sicily, Tancred, the town became a refuge for many fleeing Muslims.

In 1208, a Muslim uprising succeeded in retaking the town from Christian rule. In 1222, while speaking with the pope, Frederick II of Sicily cited the need to fight the Muslims of Corleone as a reason for his inability to send a large crusader army to Jerusalem. To this day the rock formation Castello Soprano, has a Saracen lookout tower on top of it. While the town's other rock formation, Castello Sottano, did not preserve its own Saracen fortification, it is still also known as Castello di Saraceni.

Nearly a century later, in 1180, it was enfeoffed (deeded) to the new diocese of Monreale. In this period, Corleone was largely repopulated by Ghibellines from Alessandria (modern Piedmont), Brescia and elsewhere—"Lombards" led by Oddone de Camerana. The migrations were encouraged by Emperor Frederick II of Sicily, to strengthen his position against the Guelphs. In 1249, however, he revoked the privilege and gave the city to the royal property, though the migration of the inhabitants from the Po Valley continued until the beginning of the Sicilian Vespers in 1282. Another Camerana, named Boniface, distinguished himself in the revolution of the Sicilian Vespers. He led the insurrection against the Angevins with three thousand people from Corleone, in alliance with the city of Palermo. In recognition, the Senate of Palermo called Corleone soror mea (my sister).

During the reign of Frederick IV of Sicily, called The Simple, the city successfully rebelled against the crown but was recaptured in 1355. Corleone was besieged from Ventimiglia in 1358. During the reign of the four vicars, Corleone became the property of the powerful Chiaramonte family, but in 1391 was donated by Mary Queen of Sicily to Berardo Queralt, canon of Lerida, but he never took possession. Instead, it was occupied by Nicholas Peralta, vicar William's son, but King Martin the Younger returned it to the royal property, confirming its privileges in 1397 and giving it some tax relief.

=== Medieval history ===
In March 1434, King Alfonso the Magnanimous went to Corleone and conceded some tolls to the city with the aim of restoring the walls and meeting other needs, promising also the inalienability of the city to which he gave the title of Animosa Civitas (brave city). However, in 1440 Corleone was sold to Federico Ventimiglia for 19,000 florins. This concession was revoked in May 1447 by King Alfonso, to be resold in the same year to a certain John of Bologna. In 1452 the city was finally granted to attorney James Pilaya. In 1516, Corleone joined the revolutionary movements of Palermo against the Viceroy Moncada. The revolt of Corleone, led by Fabio La Porta, received popular support as its purpose was the request for tax relief. However, the revolt was violently repressed by the viceroy's troops led by the Vicar General Gerardo Bonanno. Towards the end of the same century, social conditions in the city worsened further because of the plague of 1575–77 and the famine of 1592. On June 3, 1625, Corleone was sold, with other cities, to some Genoese merchants from whom Corleone redeemed itself upon payment of 15,200 florins. The terms of sale were, however, very serious. In 1648, the city was sold to the jurist Joseph Sgarlata, who then accepted the redemption upon payment.

Remarkable demographic growth was reported in the 15th and 16th centuries, following the arrival of several religious orders.

=== Contemporary history ===
Corleone contributed to the events of the Unification of Italy through Francesco Bentivegna who, after participating in the riots of 1848, captained an insurrection against the Bourbons in the surrounding cities until he was arrested and then shot in Mezzojuso on December 20, 1856. On May 27, 1860, the city was the scene of a fierce battle between followers of Giuseppe Garibaldi, led by Colonel Vincenzo Giordano Orsini, and the bulk of the Bourbon army led by General Von Meckel, which had been diverted from Palermo via a ploy hatched by the same Garibaldi. On that occasion, a team of volunteers (Picciotti, Sicilian for "boys"), led by Ferdinando Firmaturi, joined the march of Garibaldi in Palermo.

The nineteenth century ended with the social action by Bernardino Verro, a leader of the social movement Fasci Siciliani. After founding the Fascio of Corleone on April 3, 1893, he founded the new Farm Lease that was entered into between farmers and agricultural Sicilian gabelloti in Congress on July 30, 1893, held in Corleone—so much so that the city began to assume the title of "peasant capital". Corleone contributed to World War I with 105 deaths and numerous injuries on the field. After World War II, a peasant movement occupied vacant lands, led by trade unionist Placido Rizzotto, who was killed by the Mafia.

In 1943, the Duke of Aosta created the title of Count of Corleone, awarded to Arturo Faini for his valour during the Italian occupation of Ethiopia.

Since World War II, Corleone has become notorious for being home to several dangerous bandits and mobsters (including: Michele Navarra, Luciano Leggio, Bernardo Provenzano, Salvatore Riina and his brothers-in-law Calogero and Leoluca Bagarella) who became the protagonists of a violent and bloody mafia power struggle. The mayor of Palermo, Vito Ciancimino, was also born in Corleone and linked to the Corleone clan.

== Geography ==
Located in the southwestern area of its province, the municipality of Corleone has an area of 229.46 square kilometers (88.60 sq mi) and is located in a basin in a mountainous inland area, approximately 600 metres (2,000 feet) above sea level, 10 kilometres (6.2 miles) south of the prominent Rocca Busambra. It borders the municipalities of Bisacquino, Campofelice di Fitalia, Campofiorito, Contessa Entellina, Chiusa Sclafani, Godrano, Mezzojuso, Monreale, Palazzo Adriano, Prizzi and Roccamena. Its only hamlet (Frazione) is the village of Ficuzza, an enclave in the municipal territory of Monreale.

== Main sights ==
=== Mother Church ===
Work on the Chiesa Madre ("Mother Church"), dedicated to the 4th-century French bishop Saint Martin of Tours, started in the late 14th century. Its appearance today has been influenced by numerous changes and renovations. The interior has a nave and aisles divided into various chapels containing artwork, including a wooden statue representing San Filippo d'Agira from the 17th century, a 16th-century statue representing San Biagio (Saint Blaise) and a fine marble panel depicting the Baptism of Christ (also from this period).

=== Addolorata Church ===
The Chiesa dell'Addolorata is from the 18th century, dedicated to the Basilian abbot and patron saint San Leoluca

==== Other Churches ====
The Chiesa di Santa Rosalia, and the small Sant'Andrea (the latter two from the 17th century), all with important frescoes and paintings, are notable landmarks. The Santuario della Madonna del Rosario di Tagliavia, a religious building from the 19th century, is now a destination for pilgrims on Ascension Day.

=== Mafia and anti-Mafia Museum of Corleone ===
The CIDMA museum (Centro Internazionale di Documentazione sulla Mafia e del Movimento Antimafia) was inaugurated on 12 December 2000, in the presence of the highest authorities of the Republic, including the President of the Republic Carlo Azeglio Ciampi and the deputy Secretary-General of the United Nations Pino Arlacchi, on behalf of Secretary-General Kofi Annan. The CIDMA intends to pursue "Culture, Progress and Legality" as its objectives.

CIDMA has several rooms for visitors: Room of the Folders of the Maxi Trial (Italian: Maxiprocesso di Palermo), the Room of the Messages, the Room of Pain and the final room dedicated to Carlo Alberto Dalla Chiesa, an Italian general who campaigned against terrorism and was assassinated by the Mafia. The first room contains Maxi-Trial documents which marked a milestone in the fight against Cosa Nostra.

The documents, given to Corleone by the Criminal Chamber of the Court of Palermo, are a testimony to the work of magistrates like Giovanni Falcone and Paolo Borsellino who paid with their lives for their commitment to the fight against the Mafia. Among the folders there are the confessions of the famous pentito ("repentant") Tommaso Buscetta to Judge Falcone.

In the Room of the Messages, visitors may see the photos of the well-known Sicilian photographer Letizia Battaglia who had the courage to go on site to capture tragic photographs of Mafia murders. She was able to capture significant details that made her shots documents detailing the murder methods used by the Mafia in the 1970s–1980s. The different positions of the bodies allow visitors to reconstruct the Mafia's strategy.

The Room of Pain houses a permanent exhibition of Shobha, Letizia Battaglia's daughter, who followed in her mother's footsteps, taking photos of the dismay, helplessness, and despair felt by those who have lost someone at the hands of the Mafia. In the room there are also photos of Letizia Battaglia documenting Mafia crimes. This approach allows visitors to understand the cause-effect relationships that exist between the crimes and the consequences they produce in the lives of affected families and the entire community.

The room Carlo Alberto Dalla Chiesa is dedicated to General Dalla Chiesa. It contains photos of some of the main bosses of the Mafia placed side by side with those in the legal system who fought organized crime.

Local guides also offer tours through the CIDMA.

=== Gorges of the Dragon ===
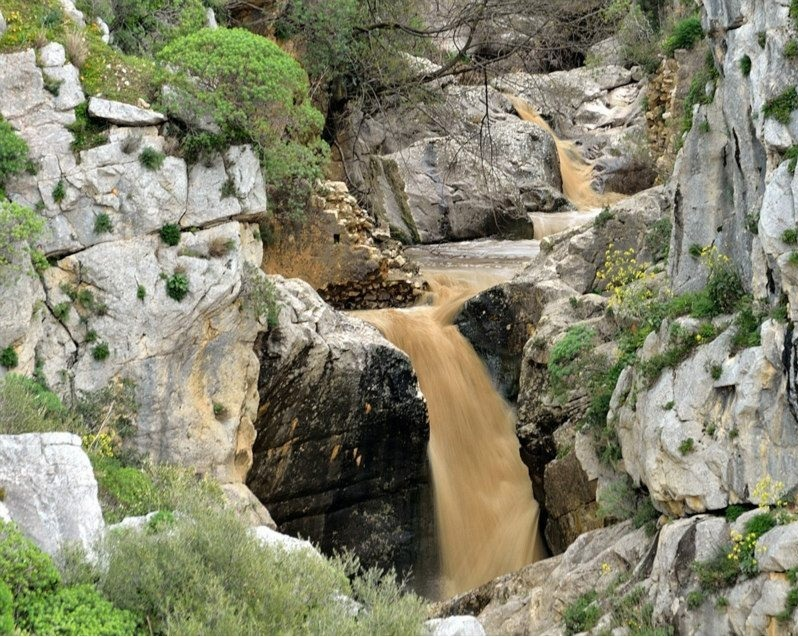
The Gorges of the Dragon

Along the road that connects Corleone with Ficuzza, following the old railway line connecting Palermo to San Carlo (a hamlet of Chiusa Sclafani) (now the bike path), is an old bridge where the Frattina River streams between the limestone rocks. The erosive action of water has produced karst topography over time forming chasms, reels and small waterfalls where the abundant water first disappears and then reappears in the boulders and lush vegetation. Of considerable size are the "pots of the Giants", i.e. cylindrical and deep holes where the water takes on a swirling pattern. Old mulberry trees, oranges, pomegranates, and figs are living testimony of the site where a mill once stood. In the section where the slope is gentler, clear water pools have formed allowing visitors to bathe surrounded by bracken, maidenhair ferns, willows and elms, in the company of tortoise, fish, and colorful dragonflies. The walls that enclose the slopes are clad in rock plants of great botanical interest such as wood spurge, cabbage mountain, the carnation, and capers. Among the crevices of the rock shelter are pigeons, jackdaws, and birds of prey such as kestrels and the peregrine falcon. Tours take visitors up to the top of the gorge where the Frattina River continues to flow, in a more gentle manner, down to the Belice.

=== Due Rocche Waterfall ===
Within the territory of Corleone, a short walk from the historic center of the city, is the "Natural Park of the cascade of the two fortresses." After going through a series of narrow streets in the district of San Giuliano visitors come to the front of a small church dedicated to Our Lady of the Two Fortresses. To the left of this church winds a path that leads between the poplars, willows, and elms to the falls. Seated on the ancient square blocks in the shade of mulberry, walnut and ash trees, visitors have an unimpeded view of the waterfall. The flow of the water in the river has formed a large pool among rocks through its erosive action. The canyon contains eroded, yellow-green glauconitic rocks occupied by vegetation.

== Corleone in literature and film ==
The name of the town was used as the adopted surname of the title character in Mario Puzo's book and Francis Ford Coppola's film The Godfather. In the novel, Vito Andolini emigrates from the village of Corleone and adopts his birthplace's name as his own surname. In the cinematic release of The Godfather Part II, young Vito, shy and unable to speak English, cannot respond when asked for his proper name, and is given the surname Corleone by an immigration official at Ellis Island. Throughout the film series, various members of the Corleone family visit the town. In the films, the towns of Savoca and Forza d'Agrò were used as locations for those scenes set in Corleone. Michael Corleone is played by Al Pacino, whose real-life maternal grandparents were Corleonese.

The adaptation of the town's name into the name of a criminal gang leader in The Godfather is, however, predated by Graham Greene's 1938 novel Brighton Rock, which was made into a popular film in 1947. The leading character crosses the rival gang leader "Colleoni" in the English seaside town of Brighton.

The town is mentioned in Victor Hugo's novel The Man Who Laughs, as the eponymous character briefly serves as Marquis of Corleone.

== Notable people ==
- Roberta Alaimo (b. 1979), politician;
- Calogero Bagarella (1935–1969), mobster;
- Leoluca Bagarella (b. 1942), mobster;
- Francesco Bentivegna (1820–1856), patriot and anti-Bourbon revolutionary;
- Bernard of Corleone (1605–1667), Franciscan Saint venerated by the Catholic Church;
- Vito Ciancimino (1924–2002), politician associated with the Sicilian mafia;
- Jack Ignatius Dragna (1891–1956), Italian-American mobster;
- Tom Dragna (1888–1977), Italian-American mobster;
- Tommaso Gagliano (1883–1951), Italian-American mobster;
- Leoluca of Corleone (c. 815 – c. 915), abbot, wonderworker, and founder of Italo-Greek monasticism in southern Italy;
- Luciano Leggio (1925–1993), mafia boss;
- Ignazio Lupo (1877-1947), Italian-American Black Hand and mafia boss;
- Michele Lupo (1932–1989), film director;
- Giuseppe "the Clutch Hand" Morello (1867–1930), Italian-American mafia boss;
- Michele Navarra (1905–1958), mafia boss;
- Al Pacino's grandparents: Kate and James Gerardi (migrated to the USA from Corleone)
- Bernardo Provenzano (1933–2016), mafia boss;
- Gaetano Reina (1889–1930), mafia boss;
- Gaetano Riina (1933–2024), mobster;
- Salvatore "Totò" Riina (1930–2017), mafia boss;
- Placido Rizzotto (1914–1948), trade unionist and politician;
- Joseph "Pete" Salemi (1902–2003), Italian-American jazz trombonist;
- Vinicio Sofia (1907–1982), actor;
- Ciro Terranova (1889–1938), mobster;
- Nicholas Morello, pseudonym of Nicolò Terranova (1890–1916), Italian-American mafia boss;
- Vincenzo Terranova (1886–1922), Italian-American mafia boss;
- Giuseppe Vasi (1710–1782), engraver and architect;
- Bernardino Verro (1866–1915), trade unionist and politician.

== See also ==
- Mafia members from Corleone
- Royal Palace of Ficuzza
