= Julie Panepinto =

American pediatric hematologist-oncologist

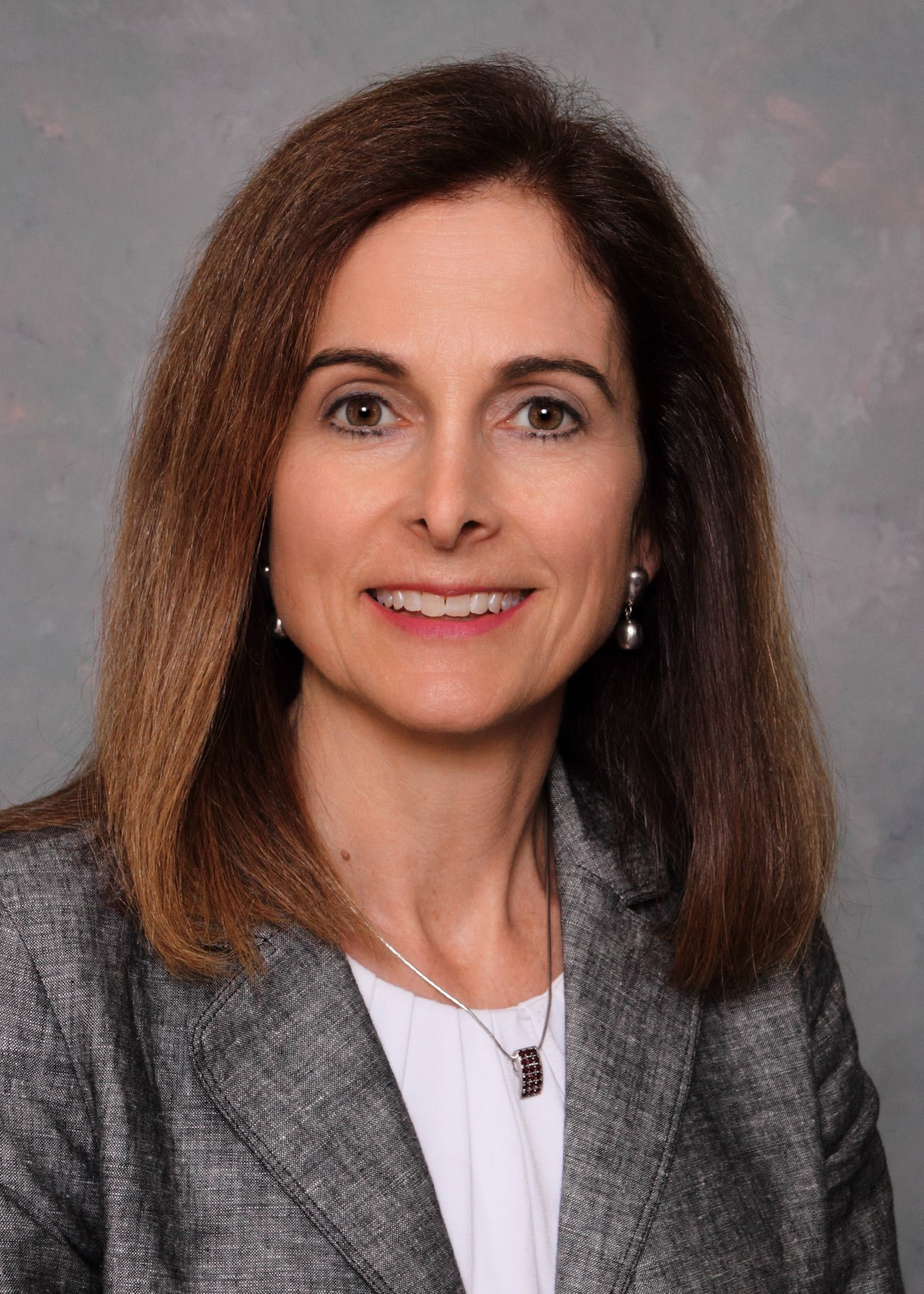
- Education: Southern Illinois University School of Medicine; University of Colorado Health Sciences
- Scientific career
- Fields: Pediatric hematology-oncology
- Workplaces: Medical College of Wisconsin; National Heart, Lung, and Blood Institute

Julie Ann Panepinto is an American pediatric hematologist-oncologist and physician-scientist. She specializes in health outcomes research and sickle cell disease. Panepinto became the acting director of the division of blood diseases and resources at the National Heart, Lung, and Blood Institute in 2022. She was a professor of pediatrics and hematology at the Medical College of Wisconsin.

== Life ==
Panepinto earned a M.D. in pediatric hematology-oncology at the Southern Illinois University School of Medicine. She completed her fellowship in pediatric hematology, oncology, and bone marrow transplant at the University of Colorado Health Sciences, where she also earned a Master’s of Science in Public Health.

Panepinto was a tenured Professor of Pediatrics, Hematology, Vice Chair of Value in Pediatrics, and the Director of the Center for Clinical Effectiveness Research of the Children’s Research Institute at the Medical College of Wisconsin and Children’s Wisconsin. As a clinician researcher with a background in public health, Panepinto focused her academic career on understanding and improving the health outcomes of patients and families with chronic disease. Her research focused on integrating the perspective of the patient and family in health care through the use of patient reported outcomes (PROs) and understanding systems of care and acute care utilization for those individuals living with sickle cell disease. Panepinto is a past chair of the guideline oversight subcommittee of the American Society of Hematology and former associate editor for the Blood Advances journal.

She joined the National Heart, Lung, and Blood Institute in June 2021 as the deputy director of the division of blood diseases and resources (DBDR). She became its acting director in 2022.
