= Joseph Salemi =

American jazz trombonist (1902–2003)

- Also known as: Pete
- Born: September 15, 1902; Corleone, Italy
- Died: January 2003 (aged 100)
- Genres: Jazz
- Occupation: Musician
- Instrument: Trombone
- Formerly of: Gene Kardos Orchestra

Joseph "Pete" Salemi (September 15, 1902 – January 17, 2003) was an Italian American jazz trombonist.

Salemi was born in Corleone in Sicily on September 15, 1902. Salemi was the youngest of three sons and a daughter. He came to the United States in 1914 with his father. As a trombonist, Salemi played with Frank Sinatra and Judy Garland, but is best known for his recording work with the Gene Kardos Orchestra from 1931. He also played with various other big bands.

Salemi played at the inaugurations of both Presidents Harry Truman and Dwight Eisenhower.
