= Gabellotto =

Farm renter

In Sicily and Malta, a gabellotto (Maltese: gabillott), or arbitriante, was a sharecropper who rented farmland for short-term use. Gabellotti leased the lands from local aristocrats more attracted to the comforts of the city. In Sicily, many gabellotti were associated with – if not members of – the Mafia. Such alliances would allow them to protect themselves and their assets from bandits and cattle rustlers, as well as cut through much of the messy legalities left over from Sicily's transition from feudalism to a capitalist market economy in the early 19th century.

The word is derived from the Sicilian word gabella (in Maltese similarly sounding: qbiela), meaning a "tax or duty in the form of a required payment". The gabellotto paid the landowner for the use of land, and rented out the use of the land to peasants or through a sub-lease to sotto-gabellotto. In practice, the gabellotto acted as an overseer and was the real power on the estate. He hired guards (campieri) to protect livestock, equipment and the property, and to control the peasants. The peasant would often be in debt to the gabellotto for the rent, tax and supplies and seeds for the planting season. The gabellotto eventually would overpower the landowner and by the mid-19th century would be the real power on the Sicilian countryside.

The gabellotto's role extended well beyond the boundaries of the estate covering the security needs in areas out of control of the state in central and western Sicily with his guards. Over the course of the breakup of the feudal economy in the first half of the 19th century he established a power to intimidate society both upwards (the absentee landlords) and downwards (the peasants).
