= Sonny & Cher discography =

Recordings by American pop duo

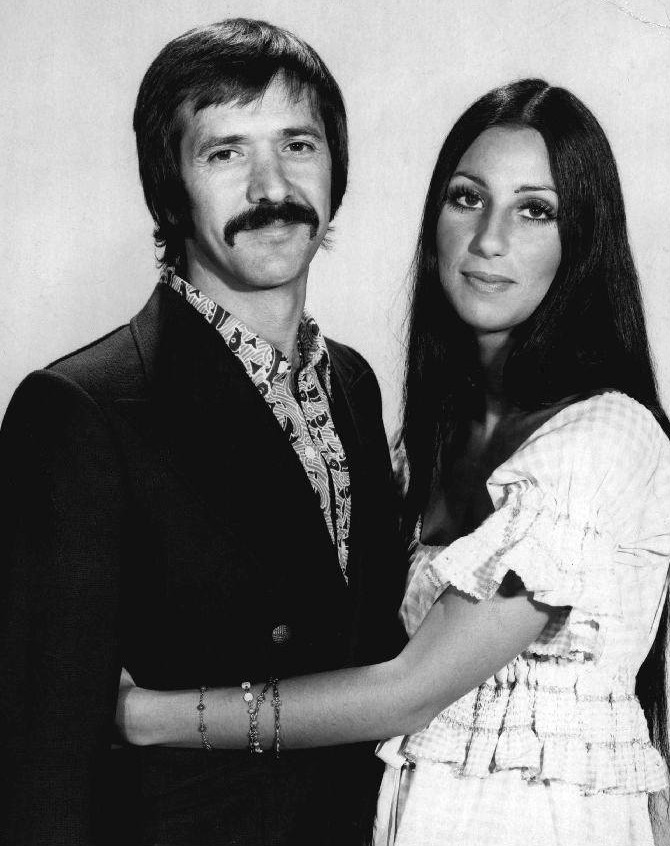
- Sonny and Cher in 1971
- Studio albums: 5
- Soundtrack albums: 1
- Live albums: 2
- Compilation albums: 8
- Singles: 23
- B-sides: 23
- Video albums: 7

The discography of American pop rock duo Sonny & Cher consists of five studio albums, eight compilation albums, one soundtrack album, two live albums and 23 singles. Sonny and Cher had released three albums and one single which achieved Gold status in the United States: Look At Us, Sonny & Cher Live, All I Ever Need Is You and I Got You Babe. In the decade they spent together, Sonny and Cher sold over 40 million records worldwide.

Their debut single was released under the pseudonym Caesar and Cleo, and was "The Letter", on the Vault Records label. Later in 1964, they released "Love Is Strange", a cover of Mickey & Sylvia's 1957 classic, and "Do You Wanna Dance" on the Reprise Records label. Those singles received little attention in the US and failed to chart in the Billboard 100. In 1964, "Baby Don't Go" was released as a single and was their first success, becoming a regional hit on the West Coast. After the success of "Baby Don't Go" the couple signed a contract with Atco Records in the US and Atlantic Records in the UK and Europe. On this label, they released three studio albums and two greatest hits compilations between 1965 and 1967. After "I Got You Babe" reached #1 on the Billboard Chart, "Baby Don't Go" was re-released by Reprise Records and reached #8. The single was included on the album Baby Don't Go - Sonny & Cher and Friends, a compilation released by Reprise with their old recordings under the label.

The couple achieved their international success between the years 1965 and 1972, especially when they were signed to Atco/Atlantic Records and MCA/Kapp Records, with hit singles like "I Got You Babe", "Little Man", "The Beat Goes On", "All I Ever Need Is You", "A Cowboy's Work Is Never Done" and "When You Say Love". Their albums Look at Us, The Wondrous World of Sonny & Chér, In Case You're In Love, All I Ever Need Is You, and Mama Was a Rock and Roll Singer, Papa Used to Write All Her Songs were released in North America, United Kingdom, Continental Europe, South Africa and Japan.

== Albums ==
=== Studio albums ===
List of studio albums, with selected details, chart positions and certifications
Title	Album details	Peak chart positions							Certifications
Title	Album details	US BB	US CB	US RW	AUS	CAN	SWE	UK	Certifications
Look at Us	Released: August, 1965; Label: Atco Records; Formats: LP	2	2	1	3		—	7	RIAA: Gold
The Wondrous World of Sonny & Chér	Released: April, 1966; Label: Atco Records; Formats: LP	34	29	14	—		10	15	
In Case You're in Love	Released: March, 1967; Label: Atco Records; Formats: LP	45	43	30	—		—	—	
All I Ever Need Is You	Released: February, 1972; Label: Kapp, MCA Records; Formats: LP	14	17	12	—	7	—	—	RIAA: Gold
Mama Was a Rock and Roll Singer, Papa Used to Write All Her Songs	Released: February, 1973; Label: MCA Records; Formats: LP	132	119	129	—	—	—	—	
"—" denotes items that did not chart or were not released. Chart not established in the territory at the time of release.

=== Compilation albums ===
List of compilation albums, with selected details and chart positions
Title	Album details	Peak chart positions				
Title	Album details	US BB	US CB	US RW	AUS	CAN
Baby Don't Go - Sonny & Cher and Friends	Released: October, 1965; Label: Reprise Records; Formats: LP	69	33	39	—	
The Best of Sonny & Chér	Released: August, 1967; Label: Atlantic Records, Atco Records; Formats: LP	23	17	12	—	9
Sonny & Cher's Greatest Hits	Released: 1968; Label: Atlantic Records, Atco Records; Formats: LP	—	—	—	—	—
The Two of Us	Released: September, 1972; Label: Atco Records; Formats: LP	122	138	122	—	67
Greatest Hits	Released: December, 1974; Label: MCA Records; Formats: LP	146	134	152	34	—
The Greatest Hits of Sonny & Cher	Released: November, 1981; Label: J&B; Formats: LP	—	—	—	58	—
All I Ever Need Is You	Released: 1990; Label: Atlantic Records, Atco Records; Formats: CD	—	—	—	—	—
The Beat Goes On: The Best of Sonny & Cher	Released: November 5, 1991; Label: Atlantic Records, Atco Records; Formats: CD	—	—	—	—	—
"—" denotes items that did not chart or were not released. Chart not established in the territory at the time of release.

=== Soundtrack albums ===
List of soundtrack albums, with selected details and chart positions
Title	Album details	Peak chart positions		
Title	Album details	US BB	US CB	US RW
Good Times	Released: May, 1967; Label: Atlantic, Atco; Formats: LP	73	71	82
"—" denotes releases that did not chart or was not released.

=== Live albums ===
List of live albums, with selected details, chart positions and certifications
Title	Album details	Peak chart positions				Certifications
Title	Album details	US BB	US CB	US RW	CAN	Certifications
Sonny & Cher Live	Released: September, 1971; Label: Kapp Records, MCA Records; Formats: LP	35	40	34	43	RIAA: Gold
Live in Las Vegas Vol. 2	Released: December, 1973; Label: Kapp Records, MCA Records; Formats: LP	175	—	—	—	
"—" denotes releases that did not chart or was not released.

== Singles ==
List of singles, with selected chart positions and certifications, showing year released and album name
Year	Single	Peak chart positions											Certifications	Album
Year	Single	US	US AC	US CB	AUS	BEL	CAN	FRA	GER	NLD	SWE	UK	Certifications	Album
1964	"Baby Don't Go"	8	—	10	52	—	1	—	—	14	16	11		Baby Don't Go - Sonny & Cher and Friends
1965	"Just You"	20	—	31	—	—	6	—	—	—	—	—		Look at Us
1965	"I Got You Babe"^{[A]}	1	—	1	3	12	1	11	3	4	4	1	RIAA: Gold; BPI: Gold; RMNZ: Platinum	Look at Us
1965	"Sing C'est La Vie"	—	—	—	2	1	—	58	—	—	—	—		Look at Us
1965	"The Letter"	75	—	—	—	—	24	—	—	—	—	—		Look at Us
1965	"The Revolution Kind"^{[B]}^{[C]}	70	—	65	—	—	35	—	—	—	—	—		The Wondrous World of Sonny & Chér
1965	"But You're Mine"	15	—	23	89	—	8	—	23	—	—	17		The Wondrous World of Sonny & Chér
1966	"What Now My Love"	14	—	18	48	10	7	—	—	—	—	13		The Wondrous World of Sonny & Chér
1966	"Laugh at Me"^{[B]}	10	—	11	—	—	1	—	—	—	—	9		The Wondrous World of Sonny & Chér
1966	"Have I Stayed Too Long"^{[C]}	49	—	51	—	—	46	—	—	—	—	42		The Wondrous World of Sonny & Chér
1966	"Little Man"	21	—	17	19	1	10	7	2	1	1	4	NVPI: Gold	In Case You're in Love
1966	"Living for You"	87	—	98	—	—	87	—	—	—	—	44		In Case You're in Love
1967	"The Beat Goes On"	6	—	7	14	5	3	17	24	7	—	29		In Case You're in Love
1967	"Good Combination"^{[C]}	56	—	68	—	—	—	—	—	—	—	—		In Case You're in Love
1967	"A Beautiful Story"^{[D]}	53	—	64	—	—	—	—	—	—	—	—		The Best of Sonny & Cher
1967	"Plastic Man"^{[D]}	74	—	78	—	—	—	49	—	—	—	—		The Best of Sonny & Cher
1967	"It's the Little Things"	50	—	60	—	—	3	—	—	—	—	—		Good Times
1971	"All I Ever Need Is You"	7	1	6	31	20	5	—	—	—	—	8		All I Ever Need Is You
1972	"A Cowboy's Work Is Never Done"	8	4	6	13	—	3	48	48	—	—	—		All I Ever Need Is You
1972	"When You Say Love"	32	2	30	—	—	16	—	—	—	—	—		Greatest Hits
1973	"Mama Was a Rock and Roll Singer, Papa Used to Write All Her Songs"	77	—	60	—	—	80	—	—	—	—	—		Mama Was a Rock and Roll Singer, Papa Used to Write All Her Songs
"—" denotes releases that did not chart or was not released.

== Promotional or limited releases ==
List of promotional singles, showing year released and other relevant details
Year	Song	Notes
1967	"My Best Friend's Girl Is Out of Sight"	Promotional solo single by Sonny Bono, issued from the Good Times soundtrack.
1967	"I Got You Babe" (Soundtrack Version)	Promotional single issued from the Good Times soundtrack.
1968	"Circus"	Promotional standalone non-album release.
1968	"You Gotta Have A Thing Of Your Own"	Promotional standalone non-album release.
1969	"You're A Friend Of Mine"	Promotional standalone non-album release.
1970	"Get It Together"	Promotional standalone non-album release.
1977	"You're Not Right For Me"	Promotional standalone non-album release.

== B-sides and other releases ==
- "Hello" (1966) was recorded during the sessions for The Wondrous World of Sonny & Chér and released as the B-side of "But You're Mine"
- "Je m'en balance car je t'aime" (1966) is the first French-language version of "But You're Mine". It was released in France as an EP, paired with "Why Don't They Let Us Fall in Love" on the A-side and "Unchained Melody" plus "Let It Be Me (Je t'appartiens)" on the B-side. It was also released as a single in Canada, with "Sing c'est la vie" on the B-side.
- "Mais tu es à moi" (1996) is the second French adaptation of "But You're Mine". It was released exclusively as the B-side of the Canadian "Petit homme" single.
- "Petit homme" (1966) is the French-language version of "Little Man". It was released in France as an EP, with "Tell Him" sharing the A-side and the original "Little Man" plus "Summertime" on the B-side. It was also released as a single in Canada, with "Mais tu es à moi" on the B-side.
- "Little Man (versione italiana)" (1966), commonly known as "Piccolo ragazzo", is the Italian version of "Little Man". It was released only in Italy as a single.
- "Crying Time" (1966) was recorded during the sessions for The Wondrous World of Sonny & Chér but remained unreleased until the album's CD reissue.
- "Il cammino di ogni speranza" (1967) was sung by Sonny & Cher at the Sanremo Music Festival 1967 and released that same year in Italy.
- "L'umanità" (1967) was released as the B-side of "Il cammino di ogni speranza".
- "Caro cara" (1967) is the Italian version of "It's the Little Things". Recorded during the Good Times (1967) album sessions, it was released only in Italy as a single.
- "Fantasie" (1967) is the Italian version of "Don't Talk to Strangers". It was released as the B-side of "Caro cara".
- "You and Me" (1967) was released as the B-side of "Good Combination".
- "Hold You Tighter" (1970) was released as the B-side of "Get It Together".
- "Real People" (1971) was released as the B-side of "Somebody".
- "Wrong Number" (1977) was released as the B-side of "You're Not Right for Me".

== Video releases ==
List of video releases, with selected details and chart positions
Title	Video details	Peak chart positions
Title	Video details	US
The Sonny & Cher Nitty Gritty Hour	Released: 1992; Label: V.I.E.W. Video; Formats: VHS, DVD	—
The Ultimate Collection	Released: 2004; Label: R2 Entertainment; Formats: DVD	—
The Christmas Collection	Released: 2004; Label: R2 Entertainment; Formats: DVD	—
I Got You Babe	Released: 2005; Label: All Stars Nl; Formats: DVD	—
The Sonny & Cher Hour	Released: 2005; Label: Arrow; Formats: DVD	—
In Concert	Released: 2007; Label: Quantum Leap; Formats: DVD	—
I Got You Babe: The Best of Sonny and Cher	Released: 2020; Label: Time Life; Formats: DVD	4
"—" denotes releases that did not chart or was not released.

== See also ==
- Sonny & Cher, the main article
- Sonny Bono, the main article
- Cher, the main article
- Cher albums discography
- List of best selling music artists
- List of number-one hits (United States)
- List of artists who reached number one on the Hot 100 (U.S.)

== Notes ==
- A "I Got You Babe" also charted on the Billboard Black Singles Chart and reached #19. In 1966 it re-entered the French singles chart for one week at #76, and the UK singles chart in 1993 at #66, almost 30 years after its release.
- B "The Revolution Kind", "Laugh at Me" and "My Best Friend's Girl Is Out of Sight" were solo singles by Sonny Bono.
- C Released only as a single, and available on the CD reissue.
- D Also available on the 1998 CD reissue of In Case You're in Love.
