= All I Ever Need Is You (1990 Sonny & Cher album) =

Greatest hits album by Sonny & Cher
- Released: 1990
- Recorded: 1972/74
- Genre: Pop rock
- Length: 43:28
- Label: Universal/MCA
- Producer: Denis Pregnolato

Sonny & Cher chronology
Greatest Hits (1974)	All I Ever Need Is You (1990)	The Beat Goes On: The Best of Sonny & Cher (1991)

Professional ratings
Review scores
Source	Rating
Allmusic	3/5 stars

All I Ever Need Is You is the fifth compilation album by American pop rock duo Sonny & Cher, released in 1990 by Universal/MCA Records.

The album has sold over 5.5 million copies worldwide.

== Album information ==
All I Ever Need Is You was released sixteen years after the 1974 Greatest Hits compilation. This was the first collection of Sonny & Cher's songs from their time with Kapp/MCA to be released on compact disc, and includes songs from All I Ever Need Is You, Mama Was a Rock and Roll Singer and their two live albums, Sonny & Cher Live and Live in Las Vegas Vol. 2.

The album includes two Bono solo tracks, the divorce song "You Better Sit Down Kids", "Crystal Clear, Muddy Waters", and four live tracks from the duo's early-1970s cabaret act. It also includes the ten-minute "Mama Was a Rock and Roll Singer Papa Used to Write All Her Songs" (this was the only CD appearance of the full-length version until the album with the same name was reissued in 2018).

The live tracks, "The Beat Goes On", "I Got You Babe", "United We Stand", and a Sonny-sung "Bang Bang (My Baby Shot Me Down)", are in the Vegas style familiar to fans of the duo's variety show.

== Track listing ==
All tracks composed by Sonny Bono

1. "All I Ever Need Is You" (Jimmy Holiday, Eddie Reeves) - 2:38
2. "A Cowboy's Work Is Never Done" - 3:14
3. "When You Say Love" (Steve Carmen, Jerry Foster, Bill Rice) - 2:25
4. "Mama Was a Rock and Roll Singer Papa Used to Write All Her Songs" - 9:39
5. "You Better Sit Down Kids" - 3:15
6. "Crystal Clear/Muddy Waters" (Linda Laurie) - 2:37
7. "The Beat Goes On" (Live) - 9:00
8. "I Got You Babe" (Live) - 3:05
9. "United We Stand" (Live) (Tony Hiller, Peter Simons) - 2:35
10. "Bang Bang (My Baby Shot Me Down)" (Live) - 6:00

== Credits ==
=== Personnel ===
- Main vocals: Cher
- Main vocals: Sonny Bono

=== Produced ===
Denis Pregnolato
