= The Definitive Pop Collection =

Greatest hits album by Sonny & Cher
- Released: September 12, 2006
- Recorded: 1965/67
- Genre: Pop rock
- Length: 92:16
- Label: Rhino/Atlantic

Sonny & Cher chronology
The Beat Goes On: The Best of Sonny & Cher (1991)	The Definitive Pop Collection (2006)

Professional ratings
Review scores
Source	Rating
Allmusic	3.5/5 stars

The Definitive Pop Collection is the seventh compilation album by American pop rock duo Sonny & Cher, released in 2006 by Rhino Records.

== Album information ==
The Definitive Pop Collection contains Sonny and Cher's hit songs from the 1960s, including "I Got You Babe" and "The Beat Goes On". It also contains Cher solo songs, like her successes "All I Really Want To Do", "Bang Bang (My Baby Shot Me Down)", and "You Better Sit Down Kids" and Bono solo songs like "Laugh At Me" and "My Best Friend's Girl Is Out of Sight".

All songs come from their late 1960s studio albums, compilation and soundtrack. This compilation also contains songs released only as singles. Unlike the earlier compilation, it includes their first hit, "Baby Don't Go," released on Reprise Records.

== Track listing ==
=== Disc: 1 ===
1. "I Got You Babe" (Sonny Bono) – 3:11
2. "Baby Don't Go" (S. Bono) – 3:09
3. "All I Really Want To Do" (Bob Dylan) – 2:59
4. "Just You" (S. Bono) – 3:36
5. "Sing C'est La Vie" (S. Bono, Green, Stone) – 3:39
6. "The Letter" (Harrys, Terry) – 2:09
7. "Laugh At Me" (S. Bono) - 2:50
8. "But You're Mine" (S. Bono) - 3:02
9. "The Revolution Kind" (S. Bono) - 3:25
10. "Why Don't They Let Us Fall in Love" (P. Spector, E. Greenwich, J. Barry) – 2:29
11. "It's Gonna Rain" (S. Bono) – 2:23
12. "What Now My Love" (Carl Sigman, Gilbert Bécaud, Pierre Delanoë) - 3:28
13. "I Look For You" (S. Bono) - 2:40
14. "Have I Stayed Too Long" (S. Bono) - 3:42
15. "Leave Me Be" (Chris White) - 2:03
16. "So Fine" (Johnny Otis) - 2:30

=== Disc: 2 ===
1. "The Beat Goes On" (Sonny Bono) - 3:27
2. "Bang Bang (My Baby Shot Me Down)" (S. Bono) 2:50
3. "Little Man" (S. Bono) - 3:20
4. "Monday" (S. Bono) - 2:55
5. "Living For You" (S. Bono) - 3:30
6. "Love Don't Come" (S. Bono) - 3:05
7. "Cheryl's Goin' Home" (Bob Lind) - 2:40
8. "A Beautiful Story" (S. Bono) - 2:52
9. "Plastic Man" (S. Bono) - 3;34
10. "It's the Little Things" (S. Bono) - 3:05
11. "Don't Talk to Strangers" (S. Bono) - 2:46
12. "My Best Friend's Girl Is Out of Sight" (S. Bono) 4:13
13. "You Better Sit Down Kids" (S. Bono) - 3:47
14. "Good Combination" (Barkan) 2:57

== Credits ==
=== Personnel ===
- Main vocals: Cher
- Main vocals: Sonny Bono
