= The Beat Goes On: The Best of Sonny & Cher =

Greatest hits album by Sonny & Cher
- Released: November 5, 1991; May 27, 1993; 2004
- Recorded: 1965/67
- Genre: Pop rock
- Length: 66:34
- Label: Atco/Atlantic
- Producer: Bill Inglot

Sonny & Cher chronology
All I Ever Need Is You (1990)	The Beat Goes On: The Best of Sonny & Cher (1991)	The Definitive Pop Collection (2006)

Professional ratings
Review scores
Source	Rating
Allmusic	4.5/5 stars

The Beat Goes On: The Best of Sonny & Cher is the sixth compilation album by American pop rock duo Sonny & Cher, released in 1991 by Atco/Atlantic Records.

== Album information ==
The Beat Goes On: The Best of Sonny & Cher is a collection of Sonny and Cher's classic Atco era recordings. Besides the duo's hits, it includes some Bono solo singles, most notably the 45 edit of "My Best Friend's Girl Is Out of Sight", from his 1967 solo album Inner Views. None of Cher's solo material is here.

A handful of their songs, such as "Baby Don't Go" and their breakout "I Got You Babe", represent the peak of a certain style of commercial folk-pop that was one of the defining sounds of the 1960s. It also includes lesser-known tracks, like the full-on Phil Spector tribute "It's the Little Things", the waltz-time "A Beautiful Story", and a spoken-word B-side called "Hello,".

== Track listing ==
All tracks composed by Sonny Bono; except where noted.

1. "Baby Don't Go" – 3:09
2. "Just You" – 3:36
3. "Sing C'est La Vie" (Sonny Bono, Green, Stone) – 3:39
4. "I Got You Babe" – 3:11
5. "Why Don't They Let Us Fall in Love" (Phil Spector, E. Greenwich, J. Barry) – 2:29
6. "Laugh At Me" - 2:50
7. "But You're Mine" - 3:02
8. "The Revolution Kind" - 3:25
9. "What Now My Love" (Carl Sigman, Gilbert Bécaud, Pierre Delanoë) - 3:28
10. "Have I Stayed Too Long" - 3:42
11. "Leave Me Be" (Chris White) - 2:03
12. "Little Man" - 3:20
13. "Living For You" - 3:30
14. "Love Don't Come" - 3:05
15. "The Beat Goes On" - 3:27
16. "A Beautiful Story" - 2:52
17. "It's the Little Things" - 3:05
18. "My Best Friend's Girl Is Out of Sight" - 4:13
19. "Good Combination" (Barkan) 2:57
20. "I Got You Babe (Good Times Soundtrack Version)" - 2:17
21. "Hello" (Sonny Bono, Green, Stone) – 3:12

== Credits ==
=== Personnel ===
- Main Vocals: Cher
- Main Vocals: Sonny Bono

=== Production ===
- Liner notes: Ken Barnes
- Remastering Series Director: Yves Beauvais
- Art direction: Carol Bobolts
- Art direction: Bob Defrin
- Mastering: Dan Hersch
- Mastering, compilation producer: Bill Inglot
