= The Cher Show (musical) =

2018 American jukebox musical

- Opening Night Broadway Playbill
- Music: Various Artists
- Lyrics: Various Artists
- Book: Rick Elice
- Basis: The life and songs of Cher
- Premiere: June 12, 2018: Oriental Theatre, Chicago, Illinois
- Productions: 2018 Chicago; 2018 Broadway; 2022 UK Tour; 2023 US Tour

The Cher Show is a jukebox musical with a book by Rick Elice that tells the story of the life and career of Cher, using songs that she performed throughout her career. The part of Cher is played by three actresses: one portraying her in the 1950s and 60s (nicknamed "Babe"), one for the 1970s (nicknamed "Lady"), and one for the 1980s and 90s (nicknamed "Star"). The three interact with each other at various points.

The musical had a workshop in the fall of 2017 in New York City, followed by its world premiere at the Oriental Theatre in Chicago, on June 12, 2018. The production opened on Broadway in December 2018. The original cast album was released on digital platforms on April 12, 2019, and on compact disc on May 10, 2019. The Cher Show played its final Broadway performance on August 18, 2019. A revised production launched at the Leicester Curve in April 2022, before embarking on a UK tour.

== Original Broadway production ==
The Cher Show made its world premiere at the Oriental Theatre in Chicago, Illinois on June 12, 2018, and officially opened its out of town try-out on June 28 and ran until July 14. The final performance experienced technical difficulties and forced the show to close one day early, on July 14, 2018. Following its Chicago run, the musical began previews on Broadway on November 1, 2018, and officially opened on December 3, 2018, at the Neil Simon Theatre.

The musical's book is by Rick Elice, direction by Jason Moore, choreography by Christopher Gattelli, and orchestrations, arrangements and musical supervision by Daryl Waters and additional orchestrations by Steve Orich. Cher's longtime costumer Bob Mackie is the costume designer, with set designers Christine Jones and Brett J. Banakis, lighting designer Kevin Adams, and sound designer Nevin Steinberg. The producers of the show are Jeffrey Seller, Flody Suarez and Cher.

The Cher Show won Tony Awards for Stephanie J. Block (Lead Actress in a Musical) and for Bob Mackie (Costume Design for a Musical).

When The Cher Show ended its run on Broadway on August 18, 2019, it had played 34 previews and 296 regular performances.

== 2022/2023 UK tour ==
In May 2021, a new touring production was announced in the UK and Ireland from April 2022 to April 2023 directed by Arlene Phillips and featuring choreography from Oti Mabuse and produced by ROYO. Casting for the tour was announced in late February 2022 and included Millie O'Connell as Babe, Danielle Steers as Lady and Debbie Kurup as Star. This was the first professional non-replica production of the musical and contained several alterations from Broadway with modifications to the show's music, Rick Elice's book, and the costumes; which were redesigned by Gabriella Slade (Six). The tour set design by Tom Rogers, lighting design by Ben Cracknell, sound design by Dan Samson, wigs, hair and make-up design by Sam Cox, music production by Gary Hickeson, musical supervision by Rich Morris.

The tour received widespread acclaim, one review from the Glasgow Evening Times reads "Simply dazzling. This new musical embodied everything I expected from a show about one of music’s greatest divas". Several promotional performances also took place on television including This Morning and Strictly Come Dancing. When the tour closed in March 2023 at the Theatre Royal Norwich, production company ROYO (via their website and social media channels) assured fans that the production will return in the 'near future'.

== 2023/2024 US tour ==
A US touring production was announced to premiere in 2021 after the original launch date of October 2020 in Rochester, New York was postponed due to the COVID-19 pandemic. In September 2023 it was announced that a national tour would finally begin that November. The tour will be a non-union production. It will be directed by Casey Hushion and choreographed by Antoinette DiPietropolo, scenic design by Kelly James Tighe, lighting design by Charlie Morrison, sound design by Daniel Lundberg, and video design by Jonathan Infante. Costumes for the tour will again be by Bob Mackie. The first national tour will star Ella Perez as early career Babe Cher, Catherine Ariale as glam pop Lady Cher, and Morgan Scott as cultural icon Star Cher. They will be joined by Mike Bindeman as Gregg Allman/John Southall, Tyler Pirrung as Bob Mackie/Robert Altman/Frank, Lucy Werner as Georgia Holt/Lucille Ball, and Lorenzo Pugliese as Sonny Bono. Rounding out the cast are Emma Alteri, Michelle Arotsky, Neftali Benitez, Charles Blaha, Gary Paul Bowman, Emma Jade Branson, Kevin Michael Buckley, Samantha Butts, Liz Davis, Mollie Downes, Jordan Gold, Nathan Hoty, Tre Kanaley, Drew Lake, Mason Derreck Lewis, and Grace Napoletano.

== Principal casts ==
Character	Workshop (2017)	Chicago (2018)	Broadway (2018)	UK & Ireland tour (2022–23)	Maine (2022)	Long Island (2022)	First US Tour (2023–24)
Star	Lesli Margherita	Stephanie J. Block	Stephanie J. Block	Debbie Kurup	Sara Gettelfinger	Aléna Watters	Morgan Scott
Lady	Lena Hall	Teal Wicks	Teal Wicks	Danielle Steers	Charissa Hogeland	Charissa Hogeland	Catherine Ariale
Babe	Jillian Mueller	Micaela Diamond	Micaela Diamond	Millie O'Connell	Madeline Hudelson	Madeline Hudelson	Ella Perez
Sonny Bono	Jarrod Spector	Jarrod Spector	Jarrod Spector	Lucas Rush	Dino Nicandros	Dino Nicandros	Lorenzo Pugliese
Bob Mackie/Robert Altman/Frank^{*}	Christopher Sieber	Michael Berresse	Michael Berresse	Jake Mitchell	David Engel	David Engel	Tyler Pirrung
Rob Camilletti/Lee^{**}	Bobby Conte Thorton	Michael Campayno	Michael Campayno	Sam Ferriday	Zack Zaromatidis	Alexander Ríos	Gary Paul Bowman
Gregg Allman/John Southall^{**}	Unknown	Matthew Hydzik	Matthew Hydzik	Sam Ferriday	Matthew Hydzik	John Rochette	Mike Bindeman
Georgia Holt/Lucille Ball^{***}	Haven Burton	Emily Skinner	Emily Skinner	Tori Scott	Angie Schworer	Angie Schworer	Lucy Werner

^* Role changed to solely Bob Mackie for UK/Ireland tour
^** Characters combined into single role of Gregg Allman/Rob Camilletti/Phil Spector/John Southall for UK/Ireland tour Role changed to solely Rob Camilletti for US tour
^*** Role changed to solely Georgia Holt for UK/Ireland tour

== Musical numbers ==
=== Broadway production ===
Act I

- "If I Could Turn Back Time" – Star and Company
- "Half-Breed" – Georgia Holt, Star, and Lady
- "A Dream Is A Wish Your Heart Makes" – Georgia Holt and Babe †
- "You Better Sit Down Kids" – Georgia Holt †
- "Be My Baby/Da Doo Ron Ron (Phil Spector Medley)" – Babe, Phil Spector, Sonny and Company †
- "The Shoop Shoop Song (It's in His Kiss)" – Star, Lady, Babe and Company
- "I Like It Like That" – The Dave Clark Five †
- "I Got You Babe" – Babe and Sonny
- "Little Man" – Babe and Sonny †
- "When the Money's Gone / All or Nothing" – Lady, Babe, Sonny and Company
- "VAMP" – Star †
- "Ain't Nobody's Business If I Do" – Star, Lady, Babe, Bob and Company
- "Living in a House Divided" – Star, Lady, Babe and Sonny
- "Bang Bang (My Baby Shot Me Down)" – Star, Lady and Company
- "Believe" – Star, Lady and Babe
- "Song for the Lonely" – Star, Lady and Babe

Act II

- "All I Ever Need Is You" – Lady and Sonny
- "Heart of Stone" – Lady and Lucille Ball
- "Gypsies, Tramps and Thieves" – Star and Company
- "Midnight Rider / Ramblin' Man" – Gregg Allman
- "Just Like Jesse James" – Star, Gregg Allman and Company
- "Dark Lady" – Sonny and Gregg Allman
- "Baby Don't Go" – Sonny †
- "Strong Enough" – Star and Lady
- "The Way of Love" – Star
- "The Beat Goes On" – Star, Babe, Bob Mackie, Bob Mackie's Assistant and Company
- "I Found Someone" – Star, Rob Camiletti and Company
- "You Haven't Seen the Last of Me" – Star, Lady and Babe
- "Finale" ("Believe"/"Strong Enough"/"Woman's World"/"All Or Nothing"/"You Haven’t Seen The Last of Me") – Star, Lady, Babe and Company
- "Take Me Home (Curtain Call)" – Company †

† Not featured on Original Broadway Cast Recording

=== 2022 UK Tour ===
Songs listed as they appear in the official set list.

Act I

- "Believe" – Company
- "If I Could Turn Back Time" – Star and Company
- "Half-Breed" – Georgia Holt and Babe
- "A Dream Is A Wish Your Heart Makes" – Babe, Georgia and Star
- "You Better Sit Down Kid" – Georgia
- "Half Breed (Reprise)" – Lady, Babe and Star
- "Da Doo Ron Ron" – Babe, Star, Lady and Company
- "Be My Baby" – Company
- "The Shoop Shoop Song (It's in His Kiss)" – Babe, Star, Lady and Company
- "I Got You Babe" – Babe and Sonny
- "Little Man" – Sonny
- "When the Money's Gone / All or Nothing" – Babe, Sonny, Star, Lady and Company
- "VAMP" – Lady, Babe and Star
- "Ain't Nobody's Business If I Do" – Bob Mackie, Lady, Babe, Star and Company
- "Bang Bang" – Lady
- "Living in a House Divided" – Star, Babe, Lady and Sonny
- "Bang Bang (Reprise)" – Lady, Star, Babe and Company
- "Believe" – Star, Lady, and Babe
- "All I Ever Need Is You" – Lady and Sonny
- "Song for the Lonely" – Star, Lady, and Babe

Act II

- "Gypsies, Tramps and Thieves" – Star and Company
- "Midnight Rider" – Gregg Allman
- "Just Like Jesse James" – Star, Gregg and Company
- "Believe (Reprise)" – Lady and Babe
- "Dark Lady" – Star, Sonny, Gregg and Company
- "Baby Don't Go" – Sonny
- "Strong Enough" – Star, Lady and Babe
- "The Way of Love" – Star
- "The Beat Goes On" – Star, Babe, Bob, Lady and Company
- "Dov'è L'amore" – Star and Company
- "I Found Someone" – Lady and Star
- "A Different Kind of Love Song" – Rob Camiletti, Star and Georgia
- "Heart of Stone" – Star
- "We All Sleep Alone" (removed August 2022) – Lady
- "Song for the Lonely" (Reprise) (added August 2022) – Lady
- "I Got You Babe (Reprise)" – Star and Sonny
- "You Haven't Seen the Last of Me" – Star, Babe and Lady
- "A Dream is a Wish Your Heart Makes (Reprise)" – Star and Georgia

Finale (Medley comprising, in order, "Believe", "Strong Enough", "Woman's World", "Dov'è L'amore", "The Shoop Shoop Song (It's in His Kiss)", "I Found Someone", and "Believe".)

== Awards and nominations ==
=== Original Broadway production ===
Year	Award	Category	Nominee	Result
2019	Tony Award	Best Actress in a Musical	Stephanie J. Block	Won
2019	Tony Award	Best Costume Design of a Musical	Bob Mackie	Won
2019	Tony Award	Best Lighting Design of a Musical	Kevin Adams	Nominated
2019	Drama Desk Award	Outstanding Actress in a Musical	Stephanie J. Block	Won
2019	Drama Desk Award	Outstanding Orchestrations	Daryl Waters	Nominated
2019	Drama Desk Award	Outstanding Costume Design for a Musical	Bob Mackie	Won
2019	Drama Desk Award	Outstanding Wig and Hair Design	Charles G. LaPointe	Won
2019	Drama League Award	Outstanding Production of a Broadway or Off-Broadway Musical		Nominated
2019	Drama League Award	Distinguished Performance Award	Stephanie J. Block	Nominated
2019	Outer Critics Circle Award	Outstanding Actress In a Musical	Stephanie J. Block	Won
2019	Outer Critics Circle Award	Outstanding Choreographer	Christopher Gattelli	Nominated
2019	Outer Critics Circle Award	Outstanding Costume Design (Play or Musical)	Bob Mackie	Won
2019	Theatre World Award	Outstanding Debut Performance	Micaela Diamond	Honoree
2019	Chita Rivera Award	Ambassadors for the Arts Award	Cher, Flody Squarez, Jeffery Seller	Honorees
2019	Chita Rivera Award	Outstanding Ensemble in a Broadway Show		Nominated
2019	Chita Rivera Award	Outstanding Female Dancer in a Broadway Show	Ashley Blair Fitzgerald	Won
2019	Artios Award	New York Broadway Theatre - Musical	Bernie Telsey, Patrick Goodwin	Nominated
