= The Best of Sonny & Chér =

The Best Of Sonny & Chér

Greatest hits album by Sonny & Cher
- Released: August 12, 1967
- Recorded: 1965–67
- Genre: Folk rock; pop rock
- Length: 38:16
- Label: Atlantic; ATCO
- Producer: Sonny Bono

Sonny & Cher chronology
| Good Times (1967) | The Best Of Sonny & Chér (1967) | Sonny & Cher's Greatest Hits (1968) |

Singles from The Best of Sonny & Cher
- 1. "A Beautiful Story" Released: April 1967

Professional ratings
Review scores
| Source | Rating |
|---|---|
| AllMusic | 4.0/5 stars |

The Best Of Sonny & Chér is the first compilation album by American pop duo Sonny & Cher, released on August 12, 1967 by Atlantic/ATCO Records. It is one of their best selling albums in the US, reaching number 23 and spending 64 weeks on the Billboard albums chart.

== Album information ==
The Best of Sonny & Chér contains Sonny and Cher's hits released through Atco from 1965 to 1967, including "The Beat Goes On", "I Got You Babe", "But You're Mine" and "Little Man". The duo's first major hit, "Baby Don't Go", is not included in the album, as it was owned and released by Reprise Records prior to Sonny and Cher's signing with Atco.

This compilation was also remastered in the 1991 compilation The Beat Goes On: The Best Of Sonny & Cher alongside many other tracks. The original The Best of Sonny & Chér compilation album in its entirety remains unreleased on compact disc.

== Track listing ==
All tracks composed by Sonny Bono; except where indicated

=== Side A ===
1. "The Beat Goes On" - 3:23
2. "What Now My Love" (Carl Sigman, Gilbert Bécaud, Pierre Delanoë) - 3:28
3. "I Got You Babe" - 3:11
4. "Little Man" - 3:15
5. "Just You" - 3:36
6. "Let It Be Me" (Gilbert Bécaud, Mann Curtis, Pierre Delanoë) - 2:25

=== Side B ===
1. "A Beautiful Story" - 2:52
2. "It's the Little Things" - 3:31
3. "But You're Mine" - 3:02
4. "Sing C'est La Vie" (Bono, Charles Greene, Brian Stone) - 3:39
5. "Laugh At Me" - 2:50
6. "Living For You" - 3:30

== Charts ==
Weekly chart performance for The Best of Sonny & Chér
| Chart (1967) | Peak position |
|---|---|
| Canadian Albums Chart (RPM) | 9 |
| US Billboard 200 | 23 |
| US Cash Box Top 100 Albums | 17 |
| US Record World Top 100 LP's | 12 |

=== Year-end charts ===
Year-end chart performance for The Best of Sonny & Chér
| Chart (1967) | Position |
|---|---|
| US Cash Box | 85 |

== Credits ==
=== Personnel ===
- Main vocals: Cher
- Main vocals: Sonny Bono

=== Production ===
- Sonny Bono: Producer
