= Greatest Hits (Sonny & Cher album) =

Greatest hits album by Sonny & Cher
- Released: September 1974
- Recorded: 1965/73
- Genre: Pop rock
- Length: 28:51
- Label: MCA
- Producer: Sonny Bono, Snuff Garrett, Denis Pregnolato

Sonny & Cher chronology
Live in Las Vegas Vol. 2 (1973)	Greatest Hits (1974)	All I Ever Need Is You (1990)

Greatest Hits is the fourth compilation album by American pop rock duo Sonny & Cher, released in 1974 by MCA Records.

== Album information ==
Greatest Hits was released in 1974 and reached #146 on the Billboard album charts.

Greatest Hits contains Sonny and Cher's hit songs from their two studio albums and their live albums released by Kapp/MCA Records. It contained "All I Ever Need Is You", "A Cowboy's Work Is Never Done" and the single edit of "Mama Was A Rock And Roll Singer ..." plus some live songs from the album Sonny & Cher Live.

The original Greatest Hits compilation album in its entirety remains unreleased on compact disc. It was partially released in the 1990 compilation All I Ever Need Is You.

== Critical reception ==
Professional ratings
Review scores
Source	Rating
AllMusic	4/5 stars

Cash Box wrote that the compilation "puts into perspective the contributions they have made together to make all of our lives a little brighter", adding that "you can't help but be enchanted by the numerous hits" and concluding that "togetherness is where it's at". Record World wrote that, although the material "has all been previously released", it "has never before been as timely as it is now", and highlighted the inclusion of the duo's "best" songs.

Reviewing the CD version, which included Cher's solo songs, Cub Koda of AllMusic wrote that the compilation "brings together all the hits and important tracks" from their comeback era, noting that "every Sonny and Cher and solo Cher track that charted" is included and concluding that "this second batch captures their 1970s period perfectly".

== Track listing ==
Greatest Hits
No.	Title	Writer(s)	Length
1.	"All I Ever Need is You"	Holiday, Reeves	2:38
2.	"When You Say Love"	Steve Carmen, Jerry Foster, Bill Rice	2:26
3.	"You Better Sit Down Kids"	S. Bono	3:16
4.	"Crystal Clear/Muddy Waters"	Laurie	2:39
5.	"I Got You Babe (Live)"	S. Bono	3:14
6.	"A Cowboy's Work is Never Done"	S. Bono	3:14
7.	"United We Stand"	Tony Hiller, Peter Simons	2:35
8.	"The Beat Goes On (Live)"	S. Bono	2:18
9.	"What Now My Love (Live)"	Carl Sigman, Gilbert Bécaud, Pierre Delanoë	2:48
10.	"Mama Was a Rock and Roll Singer Papa Used to Write All Her Songs (Single Edit)"	S. Bono	3:43

== Charts ==
Weekly chart performance for Greatest Hits
Chart (1974–1975)	Peak position
Australian Albums (Kent Music Report)	35
US Billboard 200	146
US Cash Box Top 100 Albums	134
US Record World Top 100 LP's	152

== Credits ==
=== Personnel ===
- Main vocals: Cher
- Main vocals: Sonny Bono

=== Production ===
- Sonny Bono: Producer
