= The Two of Us (Sonny & Cher album) =

Sonny & Cher's Greatest Hits

Greatest hits album by Sonny & Cher
- Released: August 1972
- Recorded: 1965/67
- Genre: Pop rock
- Length: 71:53
- Label: Atco
- Producer: Sonny Bono

Sonny & Cher chronology
All I Ever Need Is You (1972)	Sonny & Cher's Greatest Hits (1972)	Mama Was a Rock and Roll Singer, Papa Used to Write All Her Songs (1973)

Professional ratings
Review scores
Source	Rating
AllMusic	2/5 stars

The Two of Us is the third compilation album by American rock duo Sonny & Cher, released in 1972 by Atco Records.

== Album information ==
The album was released in 1972 and reached #122 on the Billboard album charts.

The Two of Us consists of 24 tracks and a 2 LP vinyl set. It repackages two albums, "Look at Us" and "In Case You're In Love", although "500 Miles" from Look at Us is replaced by "Baby Don't Go". It was also released only in US.

The original The Two of Us compilation album in its entirety remains unreleased on compact disc.

== Track listing ==
=== Side A ===
1. "I Got You Babe" (Sonny Bono) – 3:09
2. "Unchained Melody" (Hy Zaret, Alex North) – 3:48
3. "Then He Kissed Me" (Phil Spector, Ellie Greenwich, Jeff Barry) – 2:51
4. "Sing C'est La Vie" (S. Bono, Green, Stone) – 3:37
5. "It's Gonna Rain" (S. Bono) – 2:23
6. "Baby Don't Go" (S. Bono) – 3:05

=== Side B ===
1. "Just You" (S. Bono) – 3:36
2. "The Letter" (Harrys, Terry) – 2:09
3. "Let It Be Me" (Gilbert Bécaud, Mann Curtis, Pierre Delanoë) – 2:25
4. "You Don't Love Me" (Raye) – 2:32
5. "You've Really Got a Hold on Me" (Smokey Robinson) – 2:24
6. "Why Don't They Let Us Fall in Love" (P. Spector, E. Greenwich, J. Barry) – 2:29

=== Side C ===
1. "The Beat Goes On" (Sonny Bono) - 3:23
2. "Groovy Kind of Love" (Carole Bayer Sager, Toni Wine) - 2:20
3. "You Baby" (Phil Spector) - 2:45
4. "Monday" (S. Bono) - 2:55
5. "Love Don't Come" (S. Bono) - 3:05
6. "Podunk" (S. Bono) - 2:53

=== Side D ===
1. "Little Man" (S. Bono) - 3:15
2. "We'll Sing in the Sunshine" (Gale Garnett) - 2:40
3. "Misty Roses" (Tim Hardin) - 3:05
4. "Stand By Me" (Ben E. King, Jerry Leiber and Mike Stoller) - 3:40
5. "Living For You" (S. Bono) - 3:30
6. "Cheryl's Goin' Home" (Bob Lind) - 2:40

== Charts ==
Weekly chart performance for The Two of Us
Chart (1972)	Peak position
Canadian Albums Chart	67
US Billboard 200	122
US Cash Box Top 100 Albums	138
US Record World Top 100 LP's	122

== Credits ==
=== Personnel ===
- Main vocals: Cher
- Main vocals: Sonny Bono

=== Production ===
- Sonny Bono: Producer
