= Backstage (album) =

Studio album by Cher
- Released: May 27, 1968
- Recorded: 1967/68
- Studios: Gold Star (Hollywood, California)
- Genres: Pop; folk
- Length: 36:17
- Labels: Liberty; Imperial; BGO
- Producers: Sonny Bono; Harold R. Battiste Jr.; Denis Pregnolato

Cher chronology
With Love, Chér (1967)	Backstage (1968)	Chér's Golden Greats (1968)

Singles from Backstage
- 1. "The Click Song" Released: January 22, 1968; 2. "Take Me for a Little While" Released: June 10, 1968

Backstage is the fifth album by American singer-actress Cher, released in June 1968 by Imperial Records. This album was her first commercial failure, failing to chart. The album is by-and-large a covers album.

== Album information ==
Backstage was released in 1968, was produced once again by Sonny Bono with Denis Pregnolato and Harold R. Battiste Jr. and was Cher's last album on the Liberty Records subsidiary Imperial Records.

Ten of the 12 tracks were also issued in 1970 as an LP on Sunset Records (Liberty Records' budget subsidiary) as This Is Cher (the songs "A House is Not a Home" and "Song Called Children" were not included).

In this year Cher recorded two other songs: "Yours Until Tomorrow" and "The Thought Of Loving You". "Yours Until Tomorrow" was released as a single with "The Thought Of Loving You".

The album was re-issued on CD in 2007 along with the greatest hits release Golden Greats.

In 2016, the song "It All Adds Up Now" was used in the NatWest advertising campaign, with the title of the song being used as the company's slogan. This was following the success of an Amazon Prime ad using Sonny & Cher's hit "Little Man", evoking the public's interest in Cher's early 1960s work.

== Singles ==
"The Click Song" was released as a single together with "But I Can Love You More". Billboard described the single as having "two potent commercial sides", highlighting the A-side as "a compelling and driving ballad" that "becomes more intriguing with each listen", while the B-side was presented as Miriam Makeba's classic "in Cher's own style". On the Cash Box Top 100 chart, the song peaked at number 78 and remained on the chart for two weeks.

"Take Me for a Little While" was released as the second single with "Song Called Children" as its B-side. Billboard described it as "an easy beat rhythm ballad" and "a powerful and commercial piece of material", predicting "big sales here" for Cher. Record World stated that the Trade Martin song "gets hot and cool treatment from Cher", concluding with "Wow". Cash Box noted that the song features a "fine lyric" "tailor made for the teen deck fans", with a "medium-slow" track of "strong arrangements" highlighting a "good blues-organ backup" and its rhythmic appeal, along with an "outstanding production", making it "a potential smash".

== Critical reception ==
Professional ratings
Review scores
Source	Rating
AllMusic	2/5 stars

Record World praised the album, writing that Cher was "developing into one of the most expert singers on the scene of rock and straight pop material", and noting that her "deep and rich" voice was used "with suppleness", calling the collection "one of her best". Billboard noted that Cher "attempts to come across as a versatile performer" on Backstage, highlighting that she is "in her element" on songs such as "Reason to Believe" and "Take Me for a Little While", which the magazine described as "good singles possibilities". Cash Box praised the "strong vocal performance by Cher" coupled with a "powerhouse production by husband Sonny", noting "inventive arrangements" across a varied set of songs and calling it "a must album for all of Cher's many fans".

In a retrospective review for AllMusic, Joe Viglione described it as an album that "feels like the end of the first chapter of Sonny & Cher". He was critical of several performances, writing that "a good portion of the performances here lack that something special found on her hit records", ultimately characterizing the record as "a mixed bag".

== Commercial performance ==
Backstage was not a success and was her first album not to chart. "The Click Song" and "Take Me For A Little While" were released as singles, but they did not chart.

== Track listing ==
Side one
No.	Title	Writer(s)	Length
1.	"Go Now"	Larry Banks; Milton Bennett	3:56
2.	"Carnival"	Hugo Peretti; Luigi Creatore; George David Weiss; Jesus Maria de Arozamena; Luiz Bonfá; Antônio Maria	3:26
3.	"It All Adds Up Now"	Doug Sahm	2:57
4.	"Reason to Believe"	Tim Hardin	2:26
5.	"Masters of War"	Bob Dylan	4:09
6.	"Do You Believe in Magic"	John Sebastian	2:36

Side two
No.	Title	Writer(s)	Length
1.	"I Wasn't Ready"	Dr. John Creaux; Jessie Hill	2:59
2.	"A House Is Not a Home"	Burt Bacharach; Hal David	2:14
3.	"Take Me for a Little While"	Trade Martin	2:46
4.	"Click Song"	Miriam Makeba	2:53
5.	"The Impossible Dream"	Joe Darion; Mitch Leigh	2:26
6.	"Song Called Children"	Bob West	3:35

== Personnel ==
- Cher – lead vocals

Production

- Sonny Bono – record producer
- Harold R. Battiste Jr. – record producer
- Denis Pregnolato – record producer
- Stan Ross – sound engineer

Design

- Sonny Bono – photography
- Woody Woodward – art direction
