= Live in Las Vegas Vol. 2 =

Live album by Sonny & Cher
- Released: December 1973
- Recorded: 1973 in Las Vegas, Nevada
- Genre: Pop rock
- Length: 57:24
- Label: Kapp, MCA
- Producer: Denis Pregnolato

Sonny & Cher chronology
Mama Was a Rock and Roll Singer, Papa Used to Write All Her Songs (1974)	Live in Las Vegas Vol. 2 (1973)	Greatest Hits (1974)

Professional ratings
Review scores
Source	Rating
Allmusic	4.5/5 stars

Live in Las Vegas Vol. 2 is the second live album by American pop duo Sonny & Cher, released in December 1973 by Kapp/MCA Records.

== Album information ==
It was released in December 1973, entered the Billboard Top 200 Album Chart on December 22, 1973, and reached #175 on the Billboard album charts.

This was their third double album after 1968's Sonny & Cher's Greatest Hits and 1972's The Two of Us. The album is largely a collection of cover songs including "I Can See Clearly Now" (originally by Johnny Nash) and "Where You Lead" (originally by Carole King). No singles were released from the album. The songs "Bang Bang (My Baby Shot Me Down)" and "You Better Sit Down Kids" were performed by Bono; both were written by Bono and performed by Cher in the late 60s. Cher also sings "Gypsies, Tramps And Thieves" as a solo.

== Track listing ==
=== Side A ===
1. "All I Ever Need is You" (Eddie Reeves, Jimmy Holiday) - 3:06
2. Music Medley & Dialogue: - 3:09
3. "I Can See Clearly Now" (Johnny Nash) - 1:57
4. "You've Got a Friend" (Carole King) - 3:09
5. "Where You Lead" (Carole King, Toni Stern) - 1:49
6. "You've Got a Friend (Reprise)" (Carole King) - 0:49

=== Side B ===
1. Comedy Monologue" - 3:24
2. "Gypsies, Tramps and Thieves" (Bob Stone) - 2:25
3. "Brother Love's Travelling Salvation Show" (Neil Diamond) - 3:39
4. "You and I" (Stevie Wonder) - 5:00

=== Side C ===
1. "Superstar" (Leon Russell, Bonnie Bramlett) - 5:14
2. Monologue - 4:02
3. "Bang Bang (My Baby Shot Me Down)" (Sonny Bono) - 6:20

=== Side D ===
1. "You Better Sit Down Kids"/"A Cowboy's Work is Never Done" (Sonny Bono) - 10:34
2. Band Introduction - 2:57
3. "I Got You Babe" (Sonny Bono) - 2:59

== Charts ==
Weekly chart performance for Live in Las Vegas Vol. 2
Chart (1974)	Peak position
US Billboard 200	175

== Personnel ==
- Cher - vocals
- Sonny Bono - vocals
- David Paich - conductor, piano, organ
- David Hungate - bass
- Jeff Porcaro - drums
- Dan Ferguson - guitar
- Dean Parks - guitar
- Jack Eglash Orchestra - house band

Technical

- Lenny Roberts - engineer
- Wally Heider - equipment
- Thor - photography

=== Production ===
- Producer: Denis Pregnolato
