= You Better Sit Down Kids =

Single by Cher

from the album With Love, Cher
- B-side: "Mama (When My Dollies Have Babies)"; alternate "Elusive Butterfly"
- Released: October 2, 1967
- Recorded: 1966
- Genre: Pop
- Length: 3:42
- Label: Imperial
- Songwriter: Sonny Bono
- Producer: Sonny Bono

Cher singles chronology
"Hey Joe" (1967)	"You Better Sit Down Kids" (1967)	"The Click Song" (1968)

"You Better Sit Down Kids" is a major hit single by American singer/actress Cher in 1967 from her fourth studio album With Love, Chér, released in November 1967 by Imperial Records. The song was written by her then-husband Sonny Bono. Sung from a father's perspective, the lyrics tell the story of a divorce as explained to the couple's children. The song is featured on the compilation albums Cher's Golden Greats (1968), Superpack Vol. 1 (1972) and Gold (2005).

The song was well received by music critics. It peaked at number nine on the Billboard Hot 100, becoming Cher's second top ten single after "Bang Bang (My Baby Shot Me Down)". “You Better Sit Down Kids” became a top 20 hit in Canada peaking at number twelve. It was covered by Roy Drusky, Liza Minnelli, Glen Campbell and Bono himself on All I Ever Need Is You (1971).

== Background ==
The year of 1967 was full for Sonny & Cher. They released their third studio album In Case You're in Love in March which yielded the U.S. top ten single "The Beat Goes On" and the U.K. top five single "Little Man". In April, they promoted the musical comedy Good Times along with its soundtrack. Both of them were commercial failures. During the fall of 1967, they also released the compilation albums The Best of Sonny & Chér and Sonny & Cher's Greatest Hits. In November 1967, "You Better Sit Down Kids" was released as a single alongside With Love, Chér. Cher later recorded an Italian version of the song titled "Bambini Miei Cari (Sedetevi Attorno)".

== Composition ==
Though a woman, Cher recorded the song without changing its explicitly masculine perspective. Like her other solo hits "Bang Bang (My Baby Shot Me Down)" and "Where Do You Go", this song was written by Bono.

The lyrics are from the perspective of a father informing his children that he and their mother are separating. The song starts slow, then, after a few stanzas, a fast bridge section has the father giving some orders to the kids, including to "Say your prayers before you go to bed, and be sure to get to school on time". The song starts in the key of B, and goes up a half step on each stanza, except during the Bridge section, which is in the key of B-Flat. The last stanza and the Coda are done in the key of F.

== Reception ==
Mark Bego, author of Cher: If You Believe, praised Cher's performance on "You Better Sit Down Kids", saying that "she turned it into a soap-opera storytelling, at which she vocally excelled". Joe Viglione from Allmusic also wrote a favorable review of the song, calling it "the moment in the sun" of the album and describing it as a "tremendous performance". A Billboard article listing Cher's biggest songs, ranked the "You Better Sit Down Kids" as the seventeenth.

"You Better Sit Down Kids" debuted on the Billboard Hot 100 chart dated October 28, 1967 at number 79. The song eventually peaked at number nine on the chart dated December 23, becoming Cher's second solo top ten song after "Bang Bang (My Baby Shot Me Down)" a year earlier. In Canada, the song entered the RPM at number 78 on the chart dated November 4, 1967. It then reached number twelve. "You Better Sit Down Kids" appeared on the 1967 year-end chart at number sixty.

== Cover versions ==
Many artists covered "You Better Sit Down Kids" shortly after its release. In 1968, Roy Drusky brought the song to country music audiences. His version peaked at number 28, spending 10 weeks on the Billboard country chart. The same year, Liza Minnelli covered the song on her self-titled studio album released by A&M Records. Glen Campbell covered the song on his twelfth album Wichita Lineman, released by Capitol Records. The jazz group The Raymonde Singers Etcetera included the song on their album "Feelin'". Gary Puckett & The Union Gap also released a version of the song on their 1968 album, Woman, Woman. Later, Sonny Bono himself recorded a solo version on their 1971 album All I Ever Need Is You.

== Track listing and formats ==
- International 7" single
  - A "You Better Sit Down Kids" – 3:42
  - B "Elusive Butterfly" – 2:30
- Spanish 7" single
  - A "You Better Sit Down Kids" – 3:42
  - B "Hey Joe" – 2:40

== Charts ==
=== Weekly charts ===
1967 weekly chart performance for "You Better Sit Down Kids"
Chart (1967)	Peak position
Canadian Singles Chart	12
Quebec (ADISQ)	5
US Billboard Hot 100	9
US Cash Box Top 100	8

=== Year-end charts ===
Year-end chart performance for "You Better Sit Down Kids"
Chart (1967)	Position
Canadian Singles Chart	60
