= All I Ever Need Is You =

All I Ever Need Is You may refer to:

- "All I Ever Need Is You" (song), a song by Jimmy Holiday and Eddie Reeves, recorded by Ray Charles, Tom Jones, Steve & Eydie, Sonny & Cher, Mouth & MacNeal, Nikka & Don Costa, and others
- All I Ever Need Is You (1971 Sonny & Cher album), a studio album
- All I Ever Need Is You (1990 Sonny & Cher album), a compilation album
