= List of number-one singles of 1965 (Canada) =

This is a list of the weekly Canadian RPM magazine (Note: The magazine's weekly record charts were digitized by the AV Trust. The collection is archived by Library and Archives Canada here. The PDF text search does not work unless you have additional software installed. You must view each entry on the chart for a match.) number-one Top Singles chart of 1965. (Note: A collection of all the .pdf files cited is available here.)

Volume:Issue	Issue Date(s)	Song	Artist
2:19	4 January	"Goin' Out of My Head"	Little Anthony and the Imperials
2:20	11 January	"Come See About Me"	The Supremes
2:21	18 January	"I'll Be There"	Gerry and the Pacemakers
2:22	25 January	"You've Lost That Lovin' Feeling"	The Righteous Brothers
2:23	1 February	"Downtown"	Petula Clark
2:24	8 February	"Let's Lock the Door"	Jay and the Americans
2:25	15 February	"The Jolly Green Giant"	The Kingsmen
2:26	22 February	"Bye, Bye, Baby (Baby Goodbye)"	The Four Seasons
3:1	1 March	"Yeh Yeh"	Georgie Fame
3:2	8 March	"Eight Days a Week"	The Beatles
3:3	15 March	"Eight Days a Week"	The Beatles
3:4	22 March	"Shakin' All Over"	Chad Allan & the Expressions (credited as "Guess Who?")
3:5	29 March	"Shakin' All Over"	Chad Allan & the Expressions (credited as "Guess Who?")
3:6	5 April	"Shakin' All Over"	Chad Allan & the Expressions (credited as "Guess Who?")
3:7	12 April	"I Know a Place"	Petula Clark
3:8	19 April	"Mrs. Brown, You've Got a Lovely Daughter"	Herman's Hermits
3:9	26 April	"Mrs. Brown, You've Got a Lovely Daughter"	Herman's Hermits
3:10	3 May	"I'm Telling You Now"	Freddie and the Dreamers
3:11	10 May	"Silhouettes"	Herman's Hermits
3:12	17 May	"Concrete & Clay"	Unit 4 + 2 and Eddie Rambeau
3:13	24 May	"Ticket to Ride"	The Beatles
3:14	31 May	"Ticket to Ride"	The Beatles
3:15	7 June	"Help Me, Rhonda"	The Beach Boys
3:16	14 June	"Back in My Arms Again"	The Supremes
3:17	21 June	"For Your Love"	The Yardbirds
3:18	28 June	"L-O-N-E-L-Y"	Bobby Vinton
3:19	5 July	"Wonderful World"	Herman's Hermits
3:20	12 July	"Cara Mia"	Jay and the Americans
3:21	19 July	"The Seventh Son"	Johnny Rivers
3:22	26 July	"What the World Needs Now"	Jackie DeShannon
3:23	2 August	"What's New Pussycat?"	Tom Jones
3:24	9 August	"Down in the Boondocks"	Billy Joe Royal
3:25	16 August	"Save Your Heart for Me"	Gary Lewis & the Playboys
3:26	23 August	"I Got You Babe"	Sonny & Cher
4:1	31 August	"Help!"	The Beatles
4:2	7 September	"My Name is Mud"	Eddie Rambeau
4:3	13 September	"Eve of Destruction"	Barry McGuire
4:4	20 September	"You've Got Your Troubles"	The Fortunes
4:5	27 September	"Ride Away"	Roy Orbison
4:6	4 October	"Laugh At Me"	Sonny
4:7	11 October	"Baby Don't Go"	Sonny & Cher
4:8	18 October	"Baby Don't Go"	Sonny & Cher
4:9	25 October	"A Lover's Concerto"	The Toys
4:10	1 November	"A Lover's Concerto"	The Toys
4:11	8 November	"I Knew You When"	Billy Joe Royal
4:12	15 November	"Positively 4th Street"	Bob Dylan
4:13	22 November	"Get Off of My Cloud"	Rolling Stones
4:14	29 November	"Make it Easy on Yourself"	The Walker Brothers
4:15	6 December	"Make it Easy on Yourself"	The Walker Brothers
4:16	13 December	"You Really Got a Hold on Me"	Little Caesar and the Consuls
4:17	20 December	"Don't Think Twice, It's All Right"	The Wonder Who?
4:18	27 December	"Over and Over"	Dave Clark 5

== See also ==
- 1965 in music
- List of Billboard Hot 100 number ones of 1965 (United States)
- List of number-one singles in Canada
