= Chér's Golden Greats =

Greatest hits album by Cher
- Released: 1968
- Recorded: 1964–68
- Genres: Pop; folk
- Length: 35:39
- Labels: Liberty; Imperial
- Producer: Sonny Bono

Cher chronology
Backstage (1968)	Chér's Golden Greats (1968)	3614 Jackson Highway (1969)

Professional ratings
Review scores
Source	Rating
AllMusic	2/5 stars

Chér's Golden Greats is the first compilation album by American singer-actress Cher, released in 1968 by Imperial Records and Liberty Records. The album peaked at 195 on the US Billboard 200 chart and was released as part of the contract with Imperial Records and Liberty Records.

== Critical reception ==
Billboard noted that the album brings together some of Cher's biggest hits, observing that these tracks made her "one of the most consistent female vocalists on the singles scene" and that the LP "has plenty of sales life". Cash Box stated that Cher "has achieved great success as a solo" and that the collection brings "her best singles and album cuts", adding that it "should rack up considerable sales". Record World included the album in the weekly list "Pick Hits".

== Track listing ==
Side one
No.	Title	Writer(s)	Length
1.	"You Better Sit Down Kids" (from With Love, 1967)	Sonny Bono	3:42
2.	"Sunny" (from Chér, 1966)	Bobby Hebb	3:06
3.	"Come and Stay With Me" (from All I Really Want to Do, 1965)	Jackie DeShannon	2:45
4.	"Alfie" (from Chér, 1966)	Hal David; Burt Bacharach	2:48
5.	"Take Me for a Little While" (from Backstage, 1968)	Trade Martin	2:40
6.	"All I Really Want to Do" (from All I Really Want to Do, 1965)	Bob Dylan	2:56

Side two
No.	Title	Writer(s)	Length
1.	"Bang Bang (My Baby Shot Me Down)" (from The Sonny Side of Chér, 1966)	Bono	2:40
2.	"Needles and Pins" (from All I Really Want to Do, 1965)	Bono; Jack Nitzsche	2:26
3.	"Dream Baby" (from All I Really Want to Do, 1965)	Bono	2:58
4.	"Elusive Butterfly" (from The Sonny Side of Chér, 1966)	Bob Lind	2:26
5.	"Where Do You Go" (from The Sonny Side of Chér, 1966)	Bono	3:12
6.	"Hey Joe" (from With Love, 1967)	William M. Roberts	3:26

iTunes edition
No.	Title	Writer(s)	Length
1.	"All I Really Want to Do" (from All I Really Want to Do, 1965)	Bob Dylan	2:59
2.	"Sunny" (from Chér, 1966)	Bobby Hebb	3:09
3.	"Alfie" (from Chér, 1966)	Hal David; Burt Bacharach	2:51
4.	"Come and Stay With Me" (from All I Really Want to Do, 1965)	Jackie DeShannon	2:41
5.	"Magic in the Air (I Feel Something in the Air)" (from Chér, 1966)	Sonny Bono	3:50
6.	"Where Do You Go" (from The Sonny Side of Chér, 1966)	Bono	3:16
7.	"Bang Bang (My Baby Shot Me Down)" (from The Sonny Side of Chér, 1966)	Bono	2:45
8.	"The Bells of Rhymney" (from All I Really Want to Do, 1965)	Idris Davies; Pete Seeger	3:07
9.	"You Better Sit Down Kids" (from With Love, 1967)	Bono	3:45
10.	"Hey Joe" (from With Love, 1967)	William M. Roberts	3:28
11.	"Mama (When My Dollies Have Babies)" (from With Love, 1967)	Bono	3:28
12.	"Until It's Time for You to Go" (from Chér, 1966)	Buffy Sainte-Marie	2:45

== Personnel ==
- Cher - lead vocals

Production

- Sonny Bono - record producer

== Charts ==
Weekly chart performance for Chér's Golden Greats
Chart (1968)	Peak Position
US Billboard 200	195
US Cash Box Top 100 Albums	74
US Record World Top 100 LP's	68
