= Sonny & Cher's Greatest Hits =

Greatest hits album by Sonny & Cher
- Released: 1968
- Recorded: 1965/67
- Genre: Pop rock
- Length: 61:02
- Label: Atlantic/Atco
- Producer: Sonny Bono

Sonny & Cher chronology
The Best of Sonny & Chér (1967)	Sonny & Cher's Greatest Hits (1968)	Sonny & Cher Live (1971)

Sonny & Cher's Greatest Hits is the second compilation album by American pop duo Sonny & Cher, released in 1968 by Atlantic/Atco Records.

== Album information ==
Sonny & Cher's Greatest Hits contained Sonny and Cher's hit songs from their three studio albums and their soundtrack album Good Times. It includes "Plastic Man", written by Bono and previously released as a single in 1967. Like the previous compilation, it didn't contain their first hit "Baby Don't Go" released on the Reprise Records label.

At the time of its release, the duo were experiencing a resurgence of popularity. Cash Box noted that this resurgence coincided with the release of "The Beat Goes On" and the present compilation in 1967. Despite this, the album did not appear on any charts.

The original Sonny & Cher's Greatest Hits compilation album remains unreleased on compact disc, but has since been available as a digital download on music sites such as Spotify.

== Critical reception ==
Professional ratings
Review scores
Source	Rating
AllMusic	2.5/5 stars

AllMusic critic Stewart Mason described the album as "an intriguing hodgepodge of hits and album tracks" and "a fine summation of the duo's hit years on Atco Records, 1965–1968". He also praised its inclusion of lesser-known songs, noting that tracks like "Don't Talk to Strangers" and "Just You" "prove that there was more to Sonny and Cher than "The Beat Goes On" and "I Got You Babe"."

== Track listing ==
All songs written by Sonny Bono, unless otherwise noted.

=== Side A ===
1. "The Beat Goes On" - 3:23
2. "Let It Be Me" (Gilbert Bécaud, Mann Curtis, P. Delanoë) - 2:25
3. "What Now My Love" (Carl Sigman, Gilbert Bécaud, Pierre Delanoë) - 3:28
4. "It's Gonna Rain" – 2:23
5. "Living For You" - 3:30

=== Side B ===
1. "I Got You Babe" - 3:11
2. "Monday" - 2:55
3. "Just You" - 3:36
4. "Laugh At Me" - 2:50
5. "Love Don't Come" - 3:05

=== Side C ===
1. "Little Man" - 3:15
2. "A Beautiful Story" - 2:52
3. "Sing C'est La Vie" (Sonny Bono, Charles Greene, Brian Stone) - 3:39
4. "I Look For You" - 2:40
5. "So Fine" (Johnny Otis) - 2:30

=== Side D ===
1. "It's The Little Things" - 3:31
2. "But You're Mine" - 3:02
3. "Podunk" - 2:53
4. "Don't Talk to Strangers" - 2:46
5. "Plastic Man" - 3:34

== Credits ==
=== Personnel ===
- Main vocals: Cher
- Main vocals: Sonny Bono

=== Production ===
- Sonny Bono: Producer and arranged
