= Sonny & Cher Live =

Live album by Sonny & Cher
- Released: September 1971
- Recorded: 1971
- Venues: Westside Room, Century Plaza Hotel, Los Angeles, California
- Genre: Pop rock
- Length: 55:30
- Label: Kapp/MCA
- Producer: Denis Pregnolato

Sonny & Cher chronology
Sonny & Cher's Greatest Hits (1968)	Sonny & Cher Live (1971)	All I Ever Need Is You (1972)

Professional ratings
Review scores
Source	Rating
Allmusic	2/5 stars

Sonny & Cher Live is the first live album by American pop duo Sonny & Cher, released in 1971 by Kapp/MCA Records. The album reached #35 on the Billboard chart and was certified Gold for the sales of 500,000 copies.

== Album information ==
In 1971, the couple returned to the charts with the album "Sonny & Cher Live", on the label Kapp Records in the US and MCA Records in the UK. The album is largely a collection of cover songs including "More Today Than Yesterday" (originally by The Spiral Starecase) and "Danny Boy". This album also contained three songs by The Beatles: "Got To Get You Into My Life", "Hey Jude", and "Something".

One single was issued from this album, that being "I Got You Babe", backed with an edited version of "Danny Boy". The song "Laugh at Me" was performed by Bono as solo while "Danny Boy" and "Once in a Lifetime" (after which Sonny can be heard saying approvingly "Not bad, not bad") were performed only by Cher. A portion of this album was re-released on the Cher and Sonny & Cher Kapp/MCA Anthology All I Ever Need, and on the 1990 compilation album All I Ever Need Is You.

== Track listing ==
Side A

1. "What Now My Love" (Carl Sigman, Gilbert Bécaud, Pierre Delanoë) - 2:52
2. "The Beat Goes On" (Sonny Bono) - 9:00
3. "Once in a Lifetime" (from "Stop the World – I Want to Get Off")(Anthony Newley, Leslie Bricusse) - 2:08
4. "More Today Than Yesterday" (Pat Upton) - 2:32
5. "Got to Get You into My Life" (Lennon–McCartney) - 1:25
6. "Someday (You'll Want Me To Want You)" (Jimmie Hodges) - 4:00

Side B

1. "Danny Boy" (Frederic Weatherly) - 5:53
2. "Laugh at Me" (Sonny Bono) - 2:46
3. "Something" (George Harrison) - 4:00
4. "Hey Jude" (Lennon–McCartney) - 7:30
5. "I Got You Babe" (Sonny Bono) - 3:26

Note the running time of the album (55:30) exceeds the length listed for the individual tracks (45:31), due to banter between the songs.

== Charts ==
=== Weekly charts ===
Weekly chart performance for Sonny & Cher Live
Chart (1971)	Peak position
Canadian Albums Chart	43
US Billboard 200	35
US Cash Box Top 100 Albums	40
US Record World Top 100 LP's	34

=== Year-end charts ===
Year-end chart performance for Sonny & Cher Live
Chart (1972)	Position
US Billboard 200	90

== Certifications and sales ==
Certifications for Sonny & Cher Live
Region	Certification	Certified units/sales
United States (RIAA)	Gold	500,000^{^}
^{^} Shipments figures based on certification alone.

== Personnel ==
- Cher - vocals
- Sonny Bono - vocals
- Mike Rubini - piano
- Al Pellegrini - orchestra conductor
- Dean Parks (credited as Dean Parker) - guitar
- Matt Betton - drums
- Bert Fanette - organ
- David Hungate - bass guitar
- Dahrell Norris - percussion

=== Production ===
- Denis Pregnolato - producer
- Angel Balestier - engineer
- Nye Morton - assistant engineer
