= Inner Views =

Studio album by Sonny Bono
- Released: November 1967
- Recorded: 1967
- Genre: Psychedelic rock; folk rock; pop rock
- Length: 33:19
- Label: ATCO
- Producer: Sonny Bono

Professional ratings
Review scores
Source	Rating
AllMusic	4/5 stars

Inner Views is the only album by American singer Sonny Bono as a solo artist, released in November 1967 by ATCO Records.

== Album history ==
Following the success of Sonny and Cher, Bono released his first and only solo album, Inner Views, in 1967. Inner Views consists of five tracks and has a limited running time of 33 minutes.

Unlike his then-wife Cher, Bono's attempt as a solo artist was unsuccessful (at the time of the release of Inner Views, Cher had released three successful albums and was simultaneously releasing her fourth album, With Love, Cher). Although Bono had some mild success with his 1965 single "Laugh At Me", Inner Views did not chart on Billboard.

Inner Views does have a historical note, having a one-page ad in the first Rolling Stone magazine on November 9, 1967.

== Track listing ==
1. "I Just Sit There" (S. Bono) 12:41
2. "I Told My Girl to Go Away" (S. Bono) 4:18
3. "I Would Marry You Today" (S. Bono) 4:24
4. "My Best Friend's Girl Is Out of Sight" (S. Bono) 4:11
5. "Pammie's on a Bummer" (S. Bono) 7:45

=== 1999 CD bonus tracks ===
In 1999, Rhino HandMade released Inner Views on a limited 1500 series which included 11 supplementary tracks. The limited-edition CD gathered all of Bono's recordings on Atco during the 1960s. In 2005, Collectors' Choice Music released the original five-track pressing without any bonus tracks.

6. "Laugh at Me" (single version)
7. "Tony" (Instrumental)
8. "The Revolution Kind"
9. "Georgia and John Quetzal" (Instrumental)
10. "Misty Roses"
11. "Cheryl's Goin' Home"
12. "I Told My Girl to Go Away" (single version)
13. "Pammie's on a Bummer" (single version)
14. "My Best Friend's Girl Is Out of Sight" (single)
15. "Laugh at Me" (Original backing tracks takes 9 & 10)
16. "Laugh at Me" (album version)"

== Personnel ==
- Sonny Bono - Producer, Main performer
- Bob Fisher - Mastering
- Donald Peake - Arranger
- Stan Ross - Engineer
- Barry Prager - Cover Design
- Gordon Anderson - Executive Producer
