= A Cowboy's Work Is Never Done =

Single by Sonny and Cher

from the album All I Ever Need Is You
- B-side: "Somebody"
- Released: February 1972
- Recorded: 1971
- Genre: Folk pop
- Length: 3:18
- Label: Kapp/MCA
- Songwriter: Sonny Bono
- Producer: Snuff Garrett

Sonny and Cher singles chronology
| "All I Ever Need Is You" (1971) | "A Cowboy's Work Is Never Done" (1972) | "When You Say Love" (1972) |

"A Cowboy's Work is Never Done" is a song by pop duo Sonny and Cher from their album All I Ever Need Is You, written by Sonny Bono. It was released as a single in 1972 and peaked at No. 8 on the US Billboard Hot 100. Billboard ranked it at No. 71 on the 1972 year-end singles chart.

== Song information ==
The song was Sonny and Cher's last top ten hit together in the United States. When Cher performed it on their successful television show, with their cartoon music video produced by John David Wilson, Cher's solo career was booming. The track can be heard in the 2005 film Be Cool, and also the 2010 Documentary Blood Into Wine. Allmusic highlighted the song.

== Weekly charts ==
| Chart (1972) | Peak position |
|---|---|
| Australia (Kent Music Report) | 13 |
| Canadian Singles Chart | 3 |
| Canadian Adult Contemporary Chart | 2 |
| German Singles Chart | 48 |
| Israel (IBA) | 15 |
| Quebec (ADISQ) | 33 |
| US Billboard Hot 100 | 8 |
| US Billboard Adult Contemporary | 4 |
| US Cash Box Top 100 | 6 |

=== Year-end charts ===
| Chart (1972) | Position |
|---|---|
| Australian Singles Chart | 81 |
| US Billboard Top Pop Singles | 71 |
| US Cash Box Top 100 | 37 |

== Cover versions ==
- In 2012, on Diego's Umbrella's fourth album, Proper Cowboy.
- In 2018, by Mandy Barnett on her album, "Strange Conversation".
