= Mama Was a Rock and Roll Singer, Papa Used to Write All Her Songs =

Studio album by Sonny & Cher
- Released: June 4, 1973
- Recorded: 1973
- Genre: Pop rock
- Length: 43:38
- Label: MCA
- Producers: Sonny Bono, Denis Pregnolato, Michel Rubini

Sonny & Cher chronology
The Two of Us (1972)	Mama Was a Rock and Roll Singer, Papa Used to Write All Her Songs (1973)	Live in Las Vegas Vol. 2 (1973)

Singles from Sonny & Cher
- 1. "Mama Was a Rock and Roll Singer" Released: February 26, 1973

Mama Was a Rock and Roll Singer, Papa Used to Write All Her Songs is the fifth and final studio album by American pop duo Sonny & Cher, released in 1973 by MCA Records. In 2018 it was released on CD.

== Album details ==
Mama Was a Rock and Roll Singer, Papa Used to Write All Her Songs, titled after its lead single, was the ninth studio album by Sonny & Cher. It was released a year after their previous album. The album is largely a collection of cover songs which include songs like "I Can See Clearly Now" (originally by Johnny Nash), "Brother Love's Traveling Salvation Show" (Neil Diamond), and "Listen to the Music" (The Doobie Brothers).

The only song written by Bono is the title track; it clocks in at over nine minutes on the album version, and was edited down to under four minutes for the single. Record World praised the song as "a goodtime uptempo tune that uses a synthesizer for some strange effects. Weird!". It peaked at #77 on the Billboard Hot 100 on April 21, 1973, spending five weeks on the chart, and also reached #77 on Record World's Singles Chart.

== Critical reception ==
Cash Box praised the album, writing that Sonny & Cher "come through again with a thoroughly entertaining collection, both musically and visually" and called the duo "consistently good and delightfully entertaining", while highlighting the "fine re-workings" of the hits "It Never Rains In Southern California", "I Can See Clearly Now" and "Listen To The Music".

Record World wrote that Sonny & Cher's album "will delight their fans" adding that it features "solid good-time tunes and surprising theatricality" in tracks like "Brother Love's Traveling Salvation Show" and "The Greatest Show On Earth".

== Commercial performance ==
The album was released in 1973 and reached #132 on the Billboard album chart.

== Track listing ==
Mama Was a Rock and Roll Singer, Papa Used to Write All Her Songs – Side A
No.	Title	Writer(s)	Length
1.	"It Never Rains in Southern California"	Albert Hammond, Mike Hazlewood	3:49
2.	"I Believe in You"	Dennis Pregnolato, Michel Rubini, Don Dunne	2:59
3.	"I Can See Clearly Now"	Johnny Nash	3:38
4.	"Rhythm of Your Heart Beat"	Tony Macaulay, Geoff Stephens	3:32
5.	"Mama Was a Rock and Roll Singer Papa Used to Write All Her Songs"	Sonny Bono	9:37
Total length:			23:35

Mama Was a Rock and Roll Singer, Papa Used to Write All Her Songs – Side B
No.	Title	Writer(s)	Length
6.	"By Love I Mean"	Hal David, William Jacobs, M. A. Trujillo	4:24
7.	"Brother Love's Traveling Salvation Show"	Neil Diamond	3:16
8.	"You Know Darn Well"	Tony Macaulay	3:20
9.	"The Greatest Show on Earth"	Bob Stone	3:50
10.	"Listen to the Music"	Tom Johnston	3:53
Total length:			17:43

== Credits ==
Artists

- Cher - Main Vocals
- Sonny Bono - Main Vocals

Personnel

- David Paich - Conductor, Piano, Synthesizer
- David Hungate - Bass
- Jeff Porcaro - Drums
- Michael Omartian - Keyboards
- Joe Sample - Piano
- Dean Parks - Lead and Solo Guitar
- Dan Ferguson - Guitar
- Art Munson - Guitar
- Louis Shelton - Guitar
- Larry Carlton - Guitar
- Rick White - Guitar
- Buddy Emmons - Steel Guitar

Production

- Sonny Bono - Producer
- Denis Pregnolato - Producer
- Michel Rubini - Producer

== Charts ==
Weekly chart performance for Mama Was a Rock and Roll Singer, Papa Used to Write All Her Songs
Chart (1973)	Position
US Billboard 200	132
US Cash Box Top 100 Albums	119
US Record World Top 100 LP's	129
