= In Case You're in Love =

Studio album by Sonny & Cher
- Released: March 1967
- Recorded: 1966–1967
- Genre: Pop rock
- Length: 36:11
- Label: Atlantic/Atco
- Producer: Sonny Bono

Sonny & Cher chronology
The Wondrous World of Sonny & Chér (1966)	In Case You're in Love (1967)	Good Times (1967)

Singles from In Case You're In Love
- 1. "Little Man" Released: September 1966; 2. "Living For You" Released: November 1966; 3. "The Beat Goes On" Released: December 13, 1966

Professional ratings
Review scores
Source	Rating
AllMusic	3.5/5 stars

In Case You're in Love is the third studio album by American pop duo Sonny & Cher, released in 1967 by Atco Records.

== Background ==
The song "Little Man" was the first single released from the album, and was perhaps their most successful single in Europe, peaking at #1 in five European countries. It is, however, to be noted that it never topped the UK chart as it peaked at number 4 there. The song was less successful in the US, where it reached #21. The next single released was the minor hit "Living for You" and the third single was the huge hit "The Beat Goes On". It became their third top ten song in the US, peaking at #6.

The album is largely a collection of cover songs including "Stand by Me" (originally by Ben E. King) and "We'll Sing in the Sunshine". In the album there are also two songs performed by Bono, "Misty Roses" and "Cheryl's Goin' Home". Both are now available in the 1999 bonus track of the solo Bono album Inner Views.

== Track listing ==
All songs written by Sonny Bono, except where noted.

=== Side 1 ===
1. "The Beat Goes On" - 3:23
2. "Groovy Kind of Love" (Carole Bayer Sager, Toni Wine) - 2:20
3. "You Baby" (Barry Mann, Phil Spector, Cynthia Weil) - 2:45
4. "Monday" - 2:55
5. "Love Don't Come" - 3:05
6. "Podunk" - 2:53

=== Side 2 ===
1. "Little Man" - 3:15
2. "We'll Sing in the Sunshine" (Gale Garnett) - 2:40
3. "Misty Roses" (Tim Hardin) - 3:05
4. "Stand by Me" (Ben E. King, Jerry Leiber, Mike Stoller) - 3:40
5. "Living for You" - 3:30
6. "Cheryl's Goin' Home" (Bob Lind) - 2:40

== Charts ==
Weekly chart performance for In Case You're in Love
Chart (1967)	Peak position
US Billboard 200	45
US Cash Box Top 100 Albums	43
US Record World Top 100 LP's	30

== Personnel ==
- Cher - vocals
- Sonny Bono - vocals
- Harold Battiste, Mac Rebbenack, Michel Rubini - piano
- Frank Capp, Jim Gordon, Nick Pelico - drums
- Carol Kaye, Lyle Ritz - bass guitar
- David Cohen, Barney Kessel - guitar
- Gene Daniello, Stanley H. Ross, Robert West, Sydney K. Allison, Leland Postil, William Green, Louis Blackburn, Frederick Hill, Melvin Moore - other

=== Production ===
- Harold Battiste - conductor
- Sonny Bono - arrangements, producer
- Bob Irwin - mastering
- Stan Ross - engineer

=== Design ===
- Haig Adishian - design
- Jud Cost - liner notes
- Jerry Schatzberg - cover photography
- Hens J. Hoffman - graphic layout
- Ward Lamb - liner notes, graphic layout
- Rich Russell - package design
