= With Love, Chér =

Studio album by Cher
- Released: October 23, 1967
- Recorded: 1966–67
- Genres: Pop; folk
- Length: 31:05
- Labels: Liberty; Imperial; BGO Records
- Producer: Sonny Bono

Cher chronology
Chér (1966)	With Love, Chér (1967)	Backstage (1968)

Singles from With Love, Chér
- 1. "Behind the Door" Released: October 24, 1966; 2. "Mama (When My Dollies Have Babies)" Released: November 28, 1966; 3. "Hey Joe" Released: July 31, 1967; 4. "You Better Sit Down Kids" Released: October 2, 1967

With Love, Chér is the fourth studio album by American singer-actress Cher, released on October 23, 1967, by Imperial Records. The album reached number 47 on the US Billboard albums chart.

== Album information ==
With Love, Chér was released in 1967, was produced by Sonny Bono and was issued by the Liberty Records subsidiary, Imperial Records. Once again the formula of cover songs and a new song written by Bono exclusively for Cher is used. On these tracks her voice is smooth and strong, but the sales failed to match the success of previous albums.

The album contains covers of "The Times They Are A-Changin", "Hey Joe" and "I Will Wait for You" (the soundtrack of The Umbrellas of Cherbourg). In this same year Cher recorded "Bambini Miei Cari (Sedetevi Attorno)", the Italian version of "You Better Sit Down Kids", and "Mama", the Italian version of "Mama (When My Dollies Have Babies)". Both were released as singles and "Mama" was later covered by French singer Dalida.

In 2005, this album and Cher's previous album Chér were reissued on one CD called Chér/With Love which featured all the tracks from both.

== Singles ==
Four singles were released from the album: the cover "Behind The Door" and "Hey Joe" and two songs written by Bono, "Mama (When My Dollies Have Babies)" and her last big hit of the decade "You Better Sit Down Kids".

"Behind the Door" was released as the first single. Billboard described the song as "an oriental flavored ballad with an exceptionally good lyric", noting that it is given a "dramatic reading" by the vocalist and that the "performance and arrangement add up to a hit". Cash Box wrote that the song "speaks a teen-market language of its own". The song peaked at #97 on the Billboard Hot 100 and #74 on the RPM chart.

"Mama (When My Dollies Have Babies)" was the third single, released with "Dream Baby" as the B-side. Cash Box wrote that Cher "could easily go all the way with this powerhouse of a tune", highlighting its "overpoweringly orchestrated" sound and "moving story", while calling the B-side "a groovy rocker". The song peaked at number 75 on the Cash Box Top 100. It did not enter the Billboard Hot 100 but peaked on the Bubbling Under Hot 100 Singles chart at number 24.

== Critical reception ==
Professional ratings
Review scores
Source	Rating
AllMusic	3/5 stars

Billboard wrote that Cher "continues to hold her own as a solo singer", with Sonny Bono producing "some interesting and diversified material" in which "all get that distinctive Cher touch". Cash Box described the record as a "powerhouse solo offering" and the tracks such as "You Better Sit Down Kids", "Hey Joe", "Sing For Your Supper", "There But For Fortune", and "The Times They Are a-Changin" as "delightful". Record World wrote that Cher performed songs such as "You Better Sit Down Kids", "Sing for Your Supper", "There But for Fortune", and "Hey Joe" "in her inimitable fashion", and called the album a "well-done package".

Ina retrospective review, Joe Viglione of AllMusic wrote that the album "shows why [Cher] endeared herself to listeners and got to play in the same ballpark as Dusty and Petula", and praised highlights such as "You'd Better Sit Down Kids" as "a tremendous performance".

== Track listing ==
Side one
No.	Title	Writer(s)	Length
1.	"You Better Sit Down Kids"	Sonny Bono	3:47
2.	"But I Can't Love You More"	Sonny Bono	3:40
3.	"Hey Joe"	Billy Roberts	3:28
4.	"Mama (When My Dollies Have Babies)"	Sonny Bono	3:28
5.	"Behind the Door"	Graham Gouldman	3:42

Side two
No.	Title	Writer(s)	Length
1.	"Sing for Your Supper"	Lorenz Hart; Richard Rodgers	2:36
2.	"Look at Me"	Keith Allison	3:14
3.	"There but for Fortune"	Phil Ochs	3:28
4.	"I Will Wait for You"	Norman Gimbel; Jacques Demy; Michel Legrand	3:17
5.	"The Times They Are a-Changin'"	Bob Dylan	3:10

== Personnel ==
- Cher - lead vocals

Production

- Sonny Bono - record producer
- Stan Ross - sound engineer

Design

- Sonny Bono - photography
- Woody Woodward - art direction

== Charts ==
Weekly chart performance for With Love, Chér
Chart (1968)	Peak position
US Billboard 200	47
US Cash Box Top Pop Albums	50
US Record World Top 100 LP's	52
