= Good Times (soundtrack) =

Soundtrack album by Sonny & Cher
- Released: May 1967
- Recorded: 1967
- Genre: Pop rock
- Length: 32:05
- Label: Atlantic/Atco
- Producer: Sonny Bono

Sonny & Cher chronology
In Case You're in Love (1967)	Good Times (1967)	The Best of Sonny & Chér (1967)

Alternative covers
- CD Cover

Singles from Good Times
- 1. "It's the Little Things" Released: July 1967; 2. "My Best Friend's Girl is Out of Sight" Released: 1967; 3. "I Got You Babe (Soundtrack Version)" Released: 1967

Professional ratings
Review scores
Source	Rating
AllMusic	4/5 stars

Good Times is the first soundtrack album by American pop duo Sonny & Cher, released in 1967 by Atlantic/Atco Records in conjunction with the film of the same name.

== Album information ==
It was released in 1967 and reached #73 on the Billboard album charts.

The first single released was "It's the Little Things" reaching in the US #50 and in Canada at #3. Other single releases were "Caro Cara", the Italian version of "It's The Little Things" and the B-side "Fantasie" the Italian version of "Don't Talk to Strangers". The single was released exclusively for the Italian market, but the song didn't enter in the chart. Another single, a rerecorded version of their #1 hit I Got You Babe.

All the songs on the album were written by Bono. The song "I'm Gonna Love You" was recorded for the debut album of Cher All I Really Want to Do but was cut and used for the B-side of "All I Really Want to Do" single.

== Track listing ==
All tracks composed by Sonny Bono

=== Side A ===
1. "I Got You Babe" (Instrumental) - 4:48
2. "It's the Little Things" - 3:05
3. "Good Times" - 5:18
4. "Trust Me" - 4:43

=== Side B ===
1. "Don't Talk to Strangers" - 2:46
2. "I'm Gonna Love You" - 2:37
3. "Just a Name" - 6:30
4. "I Got You Babe" - 2:17

== Charts ==
Weekly chart performance for Good Times
Chart (1967)	Peak position
US Billboard 200	73
US Cash Box Top 100 Albums	71
US Record World Top 100 LPs	82

== Credits ==
=== Personnel ===
- Main vocals: Cher
- Main vocals: Sonny Bono

=== Production ===
- Sonny Bono: Conductor
- William Friedkin: Liner notes
