= All I Ever Need Is You (1972 Sonny & Cher album) =

Studio album by Sonny & Cher
- Released: February 1972
- Recorded: 1971
- Genre: Pop rock
- Length: 27:21
- Label: Kapp/MCA
- Producers: Snuff Garrett, Denis Pregnolato

Sonny & Cher chronology
Sonny & Cher Live (1971)	All I Ever Need Is You (1972)	The Two of Us (1972)

Singles from All I Ever Need is You
- 1. "All I Ever Need Is You" Released: October 1971; 2. "A Cowboy's Work Is Never Done" Released: February 1972

Advertisements
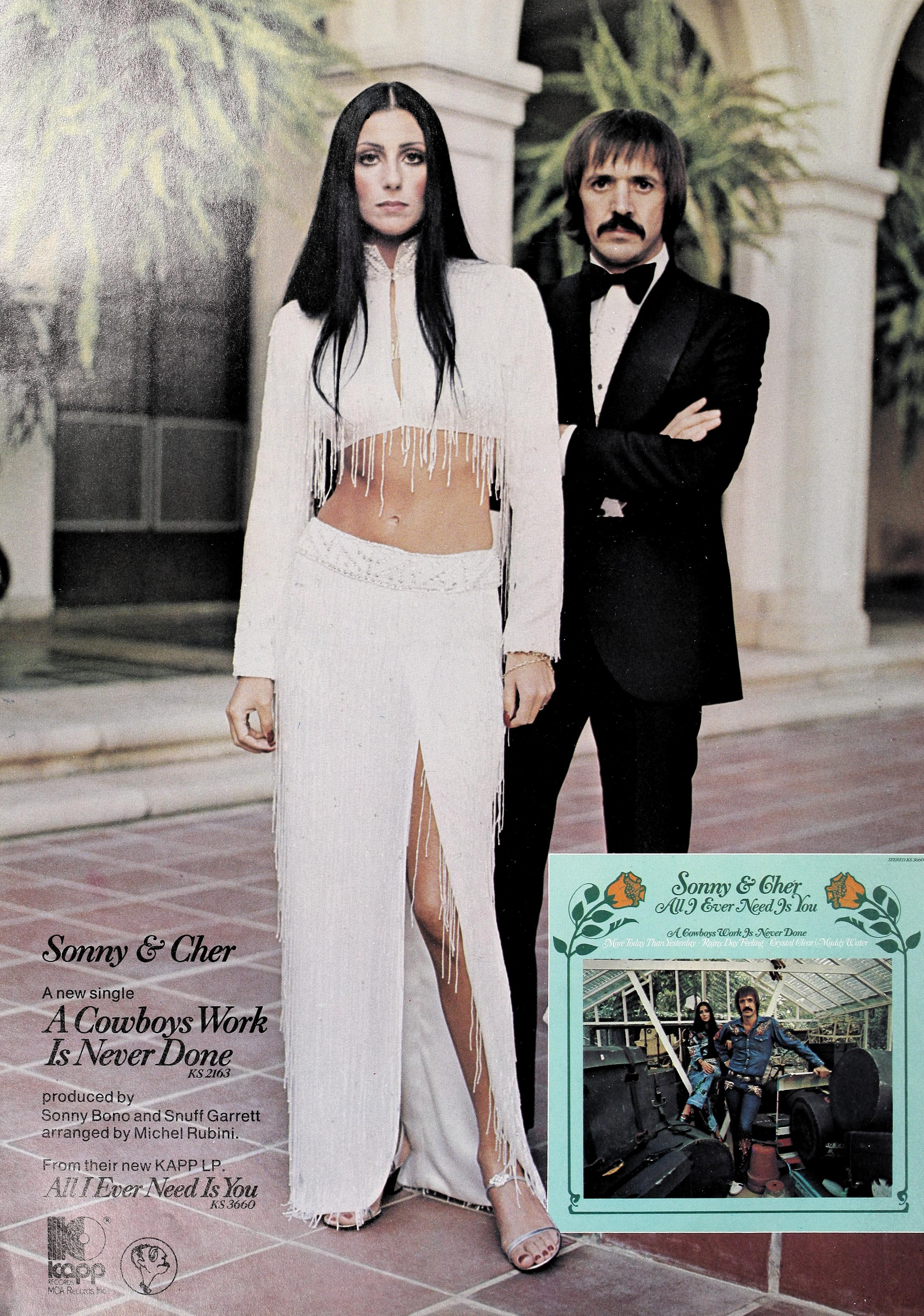
- Cashbox advertisement, February 12, 1972

All I Ever Need Is You is the fourth studio album by American pop duo Sonny & Cher, released in 1972 by Kapp/MCA Records. The album reached number 14 on the Billboard 200 and was certified gold for the sales of 500,000 copies.

== Album information ==
The album was released at the beginning of 1972, debuting on the Billboard 200 at #96 on the issue date of February 26 and it peaked at #14 on April 29.

The title track was a top ten hit, reaching #7 on the US Hot 100 chart, and a #1 on the Adult Contemporary chart. The next single, "A Cowboy's Work Is Never Done" also became a top ten hit, reaching #8 on the US Hot 100. Its top 40 follow-up single, "When You Say Love", was not taken from this LP but its B-side "Crystal Clear/Muddy Waters" was.

The album is largely a collection of cover songs including "More Today Than Yesterday" (originally by The Spiral Starecase) and "United We Stand". The only song performed by Bono solo was "You Better Sit Down Kids", which was previously a top ten solo hit by Cher.

Professional ratings
Review scores
Source	Rating
AllMusic	3/5 stars

== Track listing ==
=== Side A ===
1. "All I Ever Need Is You" (Jimmy Holiday, Eddie Reeves) - 2:38
2. "Here Comes That Rainy Day Feeling Again" (Roger Cook, Roger Greenaway, Tony Macaulay) - 2:33
3. "More Today Than Yesterday" (Pat Upton) - 2:30
4. "Crystal Clear/Muddy Waters" (Linda Laurie) - 2:39
5. "United We Stand" (Tony Hiller, Peter Simons) - 2:35

=== Side B ===
1. "A Cowboy's Work Is Never Done" (Sonny Bono) - 3:14
2. "I Love What You Did With The Love I Gave You" (Linda Laurie, Annette Tucker) - 2:20
3. "You Better Sit Down Kids" (Sonny Bono) - 3:16
4. "We'll Watch The Sun Coming Up (Shining Down On Our Love)" (Austin Roberts, Christopher Welch) - 2:29
5. "Somebody" (Sonny Bono) - 3:07

== Charts ==
=== Weekly charts ===
Weekly chart performance for All I Ever Need Is You
Chart (1972)	Peak position
Canadian Albums Chart	7
U.S. Billboard 200	14
US Cash Box Top 100 Albums	17
US Record World Top 100 LP's	12

=== Year-end charts ===
Year-end chart performance for All I Ever Need Is You
Chart (1972)	Position
US Billboard 200	60

== Certifications and sales ==
Certifications for All I Ever Need Is You
Region	Certification	Certified units/sales
United States (RIAA)	Gold	500,000^{^}
^{^} Shipments figures based on certification alone.

== Credits ==
=== Personnel ===
- Main vocals: Cher
- Main vocals: Sonny Bono
- Arranger: Al Capps

=== Production ===
- Producer: Snuff Garrett
- Producer: Denis Pregnolato
