= Baby Don't Go =

Single by Sonny & Cher
- B-side: "Love Is Strange" or; "Walking the Quetzel"
- Released: September 1964; September 1965
- Recorded: August 1964
- Genre: Pop rock
- Length: 3:05
- Label: Reprise
- Songwriter: Sonny Bono
- Producer: Sonny Bono

Sonny & Cher singles chronology
"Baby Don't Go" (1964)	"Just You" (1965)

"Baby Don't Go" is a song written by Sonny Bono and recorded by Sonny & Cher. It was first released on Reprise Records in 1964 and was a minor regional hit. Subsequently, following the duo's big success with "I Got You Babe" in the summer of 1965, "Baby Don't Go" was re-released by Reprise later that year and became another huge hit for Sonny & Cher, reaching the top ten in the U.S. and doing well in the UK and elsewhere, going as far as reaching number one in Canada.

== Background ==
Salvatore "Sonny" Bono and Cherilyn "Cher" Sarkisian-Lapiere were an aspiring duo, with Bono writing and producing songs for the couple under the name Caesar and Cleo, but with little success. In 1964 they decided to change their act's name to Sonny & Cher, and signed with Frank Sinatra's Reprise Records. Reprise executives were apparently unaware that they already had Sonny & Cher signed as Caesar and Cleo.

== Composition and recording ==
Bono composed "Baby Don't Go" on an $85 upright piano that he had purchased and kept in the couple's garage or living room. Working in the middle of the night and lacking paper, Bono wrote the lyrics down on a piece of shirt cardboard, a practice he would continue.

The musical arrangement features a rhythmic, rolling piano-and-clavietta foundation with a tremoloed electric guitar joining late in the verses. Lyrically, Cher sings as a poor 18-year-old girl from a broken family who is frustrated and not well-liked in the small town she's lived in all her life. She shares her visions of going to a big city and becoming successful:

I never had no money, I bought at the second hand store
The way this old town laughs at me,
I just can't take it no more –
I can't stay ... I'm gonna be a lady some day

The choruses are sung by Sonny (with near-equal backing from Cher) as the girl's boyfriend who wants her to stay:

Baby don't go ... pretty baby please don't go
I love you so! Pretty baby please don't go

In the conclusion the girl resolves to remain emotionally stable when she reaches the city and says she might come back to see the boy again someday. Bono's portrait of the girl in the song was partly based on Cher's early life (and indeed Cher would revisit the theme of the social outcast in her early 1970s hits "Gypsys, Tramps & Thieves" and "Half-Breed").

The recording was made at RCA's Hollywood Studios. Bono and the act's managers had to borrow and raise monies to fund the session, with the amount variously described as between $135 and $2,000 and the hocking of a typewriter and other office equipment involved. According to Cher, Leon Russell, Barney Kessel, and Don Randi (of what has since become known as The Wrecking Crew, and whom Bono knew from work with Phil Spector at Gold Star Studios) participated in the recording at no cost.

The song was originally intended for only Cher to sing, but she got nervous and froze in the studio and asked Sonny to join her. She said later that the situation was like the Disney film Dumbo: "[Sonny joined] me on the choruses, which was enough to take the pressure off me. Son was like Dumbo's good luck feather for me. If he was by my side, I had the confidence to do anything." Indeed, it was on this recording that Cher began to develop the assurance in her voice that would manifest itself in future hits. Moreover, the harmony scheme they adopted for the song – Cher singing low and Sonny doing the high part – was the opposite of the conventional male-female duo; it gave them a distinctive sound and they retained the practice on subsequent records.

Like other early Sonny & Cher material, "Baby Don't Go" was a well-produced pop effort. Bono's mentor Phil Spector liked the song and, for $500, bought a half share in its royalties, giving Bono some much-needed funding.

== Releases and success ==
In September 1964, they released "Baby Don't Go" on Reprise as their first effort under the name of Sonny & Cher. (By some accounts, Caesar and Cleo's take on "Love Is Strange" was released the same day as "Baby Don't Go"; by another, it was the first B-side for "Baby Don't Go".)

"Baby Don't Go" became a big local hit in Los Angeles and a minor regional hit on the U.S. West Coast but did not make the national charts. More importantly, it gained the couple additional attention within the industry, and led to the duo getting a recording contract from the Atco Records division of Atlantic Records while Cher gained a solo contract from the Imperial Records part of Liberty Records.

The duo broke through with the huge success of "I Got You Babe" in the summer of 1965. "Baby Don't Go" was re-released by Reprise and became another big hit for Sonny & Cher. It played a major role in their rise to fame, peaking at number eight on the U.S. pop singles chart, and number eleven on the UK pop singles chart. It did even better in Canada, where it hit number one for two weeks in October 1965 (replacing Sonny's "Laugh At Me", which had been released around the same time and which had also capitalized on the new-found success of the pair in several countries). "Baby Don't Go" also placed in the top twenty in Sweden and the Netherlands.

The song was then included as the title track on the 1965 Reprise compilation album Baby Don't Go – Sonny & Cher and Friends, an odd collection that also included some of the unsuccessful Caesar and Cleo material as well as songs from artists such as Bill Medley, The Lettermen and The Blendells.

== Subsequent performances ==
The duo's television performances of the song at the time tended to undermine its more serious side, with both Sonny and Cher doing some stage mugging. This followed the comic conceit they were known for and would embellish even more on the rest of their career.

It missed being on a first couple of Sonny & Cher compilation albums due to contractual issues, but then was included in 1972's The Two of Us. It later appeared on the 1991 The Beat Goes On: The Best of Sonny & Cher, as well as the 2003 The Very Best of Cher, the 2005 Gold, and the 2006 The Definitive Pop Collection.

The song was used in the Sonny & Cher medley on Cher's 2002–2005 Living Proof: The Farewell Tour. In this form it appeared on Cher's 2003 video documentary The Farewell Tour.

== Charts ==
Chart (1965)	Peak position
Australia (KMR)	52
Canada (RPM) Top Singles	1
Netherlands (Dutch Top 40)	20
Netherlands (Single Top 100)	14
Quebec (ADISQ)	7
Sweden (Sverigetopplistan)	16
UK Singles Chart	11
US Billboard Hot 100	8
US Cash Box Top 100	10
Zimbabwe Singles Chart	4

== Cover versions ==
The Fleetwoods on their 1965 album Folk Rock.

The Vogues on their 1965 Meet The Vogues LP, released on the “CO & CE” record label.

Chad & Jeremy on their 1965 album I Don't Want to Lose You Baby.

As performed by the band Annette, "Baby Don't Go" appeared on the soundtrack album for the 1986 low-budget music industry tale Lovedolls Superstar.

The song gained some renewed visibility when it was recorded in 1997 by Dwight Yoakam and Sheryl Crow on the former's Under the Covers album. That arrangement recast of the verses into third person in order to give Yoakam additional vocal parts.

Dum Dum Girls recorded "Baby Don't Go" as the concluding track of their 2010 debut album I Will Be. There it is slowed down and set against an ethereal synthesizer arrangement. Pitchfork describes it as showcasing "a real sense of fragility", and the effort was deemed a "lovely cover of the Sonny & Cher gem" by Allmusic.
