= When You Say Love =

Single by Bob Luman

from the album When You Say Love
- B-side: "Have a Little Faith"
- Released: January 5, 1972
- Genre: Country
- Length: 2:11
- Label: Epic Records; 5-10823
- Songwriters: Jerry Foster, Bill Rice
- Producer: Glenn Sutton

Bob Luman singles chronology
"A Chain Don't Take to Me" (September 1971)	"When You Say Love" (1972)	"It Takes You" (May 1972)

"When You Say Love" is a song written by Jerry Foster and Bill Rice and performed by Bob Luman. In 1972, the track reached #6 on the U.S. country chart and #10 on the Canadian country chart.

It was featured on his 1972 album, When You Say Love.

== Other Recordings ==
- Sonny & Cher released a version as a single in 1972. It reached #2 on the U.S. adult contemporary chart and #32 on the U.S. pop chart which became their last top 40 hit together.
- Lynn Anderson recorded the song for her 1972 album Cry.
