= Laugh at Me =

Single by Sonny
- B-side: "Tony"
- Released: August 1965
- Recorded: 1965
- Studio: Gold Star, Hollywood
- Genre: Psychedelic pop
- Length: 3:00
- Label: Atco
- Songwriter: Sonny Bono
- Producer: Sonny Bono

"Laugh at Me" was Sonny Bono's only hit song as a solo artist under the name Sonny. The song was written and produced by Bono.

== Background ==
"Laugh at Me' was written after Sonny Bono was refused entrance to Montoni's Restaurant in Hollywood because of his "hippie attire". The song begins with Sonny saying, "I never thought I'd cut a record by myself but I got somethin' I wanna say. I want to say it for Cher and I hope I say it for a lot of people."

Although Bono would have a great deal of success with Sonny & Cher, with his then-wife Cher, Bono had very little success as a solo artist with the exception of "Laugh at Me". Bono only released one other single as a solo artist, "The Revolution Kind"; however, his second single only scratched the Top 100 before disappearing from the charts (reaching no. 70); he also released an album in 1967, Inner Views, which failed to chart.

"Laugh at Me" has been released on the Sonny & Cher album The Wondrous World of Sonny & Cher (1966), the Sonny & Cher compact disc The Beat Goes On, as well as the Rhino handmade release of Bono's only solo album, Inner Views. A live version, originally from Sonny & Cher Live (1971), was also released on the Sonny & Cher collection All I Ever Need: Kapp/MCA Anthology, with Bono beginning the quip, "I'll do a medley of my hit."

"Laugh At Me" was also featured on the 1967 Sonny & Cher compilation album The Best of Sonny & Cher.

Mott the Hoople covered the song on their eponymous 1969 album. It was also covered by The Beach Boys on the Beach Boys' Party! Uncovered and Unplugged compilation and remix album released by Capitol Records on November 20, 2015.

== Chart performance ==
The song was released in 1965 and reached number one in Canada on the RPM national singles chart (to be knocked off the top spot the following week by his own Sonny & Cher single, "Baby Don't Go"). It peaked at number ten on the U.S. Hot 100, and at number nine in the United Kingdom.

== Charts ==
Chart (1965)	Peak position
Canada (RPM) Top Singles	1
UK Singles Chart	9
US Billboard Hot 100	10
US Cash Box Top 100	11
