= Little Man (Sonny & Cher song) =

Single by Sonny and Cher

from the album In Case You're in Love
- B-side: "Monday"
- Released: September 1966
- Recorded: 1966
- Genre: Folk pop
- Length: 3:15
- Label: ATCO
- Songwriter: Sonny Bono

Sonny and Cher singles chronology
| "Have I Stayed Too Long" (1966) | "Little Man" (1966) | "Living For You" (1966) |

"Little Man" is a hit single by the pop duo Sonny and Cher released in 1966 from their third studio album In Case You're In Love. It became one of their biggest hits, reaching number 1 on the singles charts in various European countries.

== Reception ==
This single became the duo's greatest chart success since "I Got You Babe" in the UK, and became one of only three top ten hits for the duo there. In the Netherlands, it became their first and only number one hit, staying in that position for six consecutives weeks. Sonny & Cher duo recordings in the first half of 1966 started performing less well on the charts ("Have I Stayed Too Long" peaked at #49 in April 1966). In September the duo embarked on an ambitious tour of Europe, but without a single to promote. While in London they recorded the vocals for the backing track they had brought along and it gave them their biggest hit in Europe: "Little Man".

Its continental flavor with Greek and gypsy overtones struck an immediate chord, and its popularity was boosted by numerous television appearances all over Europe. It was also decided then to release Cher's version of "Sunny" (from her third solo album) in Europe, in competition with Bobby Hebb's original and Georgie Fame's jazzy cover. "Sunny" rose to number 2 in the Netherlands (giving them the number 1 and 2 slot simultaneously at one point) and 4 in Sweden. Sonny & Cher then recorded their own French and Italian ("Piccolo ragazzo") versions. While "Little Man" was the high point of Sonny & Cher's singles in Europe it missed out on the top twenty in their native America reaching number 21.

== Charts ==
=== Weekly charts ===
| Chart (1966) | Position |
|---|---|
| Australian Singles Chart | 19 |
| Argentinian Singles Chart | 4 |
| Belgian Singles Chart | 1 |
| Canadian Singles Chart | 10 |
| Danish Singles Chart | 1 |
| Finnish Singles Chart | 1 |
| French Singles Chart | 7 |
| German Singles Chart | 2 |
| Italian Singles Chart | 25 |
| Japanese Singles | 7 |
| Netherlands (Dutch Top 40) | 1 |
| Netherlands (Single Top 100) | 1 |
| New Zealand (Listener) | 9 |
| Norwegian Singles Chart | 1 |
| Quebec (ADISQ) | 10 |
| Singapore Singles Chart | 1 |
| Swedish Singles Chart | 1 |
| UK Singles Chart | 4 |
| US Billboard Hot 100 | 21 |
| US Cash Box Top 100 | 17 |

=== Year-end charts ===
| Chart (1966) | Position |
|---|---|
| Danish Singles Chart | 17 |
| Dutch Top 40 | 8 |
| Italian Singles Chart | 99 |
| UK Singles (Official Charts Company) | 69 |

=== Decade-end charts ===
| Chart (1960–69) | Position |
|---|---|
| Dutch Top 40 | 40 |

=== Certifications ===
| Region | Certification | Certified units/sales |
|---|---|---|
| Netherlands (NVPI) | Gold | 100,000 |

== Cover versions ==
Italian-French singer Dalida recorded Italian ("Piccolo ragazzo") and French ("Petit Homme") versions of the song, finding success with both renditions. Milva and I Rogers also had a go in Italy with their cover of the song. The big success in France was the inspiration for an inspired cover by singer Erick Saint-Laurent entitled "Les Enfants qui jouent" (French lyrics by Monty).

In 1968 in Québec, Tony Roman and Nanette Workman has made another French cover "Petit Homme".

In 1972, Bárbara y Dick made the Argentine Top Ten with their version of the song.

== Revival ==
The song was used in late 2015 and early 2016 in a television commercial for Amazon Prime featuring a miniature pony.
