= The Beat Goes On (Sonny & Cher song) =

1966 single by Sonny & Cher

- Artwork for German vinyl single

Single by Sonny & Cher

from the album In Case You're in Love
- B-side: "Love Don't Come"
- Released: 1966
- Recorded: December 13, 1966
- Studio: Gold Star, Hollywood
- Length: 3:18
- Label: Atco
- Songwriter: Sonny Bono
- Producer: Sonny Bono

Sonny & Cher singles chronology
| "Living For You" (1966) | "The Beat Goes On" (1966) | "A Beautiful Story" (1967) |

Audio video
- "The Beat Goes On" on YouTube

"The Beat Goes On" is a song written and composed by Sonny Bono and recorded by Sonny & Cher. It was issued as a single and appeared on their 1967 album In Case You're in Love. It entered the Billboard Hot 100 chart on January 14, 1967, peaking at number six.

== Production ==
The players on the song were The Wrecking Crew. The arrangement is credited to Harold Battiste, but Wrecking Crew bassist Carol Kaye asserts that at the session she devised the distinctive syncopated bass line that is featured on the released recording, replacing the original walking bass line in the prepared arrangement.

The recording session for the song was held on December 13, 1966 at the Gold Star Studios in Hollywood, Los Angeles with a backing band of 19 musicians from The Wrecking Crew. After a two and a half hour session to record the song, guitarist Barney Kessel is reported to have stood up and proclaimed, "Never have so many played so little for so much." The song's lyrics deal mainly with current events of the time, with the refrain "(And) the beat goes on, the beat goes on" following each verse.

== Live performances ==
Sonny and Cher performed the song many times on their hit 1970s television variety shows, as well as in their live concerts. The song was included in the "Sonny and Cher" video montages during Cher's Do You Believe? Tour and The Farewell Tour. Cher performed the song live with Sonny Bono's voice track on her successful Cher at the Colosseum show as well as her 2014 Dressed to Kill Tour and 2017–2020 Classic Cher shows. It was also performed during her Here We Go Again Tour (2018–2020). In 2019, Cher performed the song during the season 28 season finale of Dancing with the Stars.

== Personnel ==
According to the AFM contract sheet, the following musicians played on the track.

- Harold Battiste
- Gene Daniello
- Dr. John
- Michel Rubini
- Frank Capp
- Jim Gordon
- Nick Pellico
- Stanley Ross
- Lyle Ritz
- Bobby West
- Keith Allison
- David Cohen
- Barney Kessel
- Carol Kaye
- Mike Post
- Bill Green
- Lou Blackburn
- Frederick Hill
- Melvin Moore

== Charts ==
=== Weekly charts ===
| Chart (1967) | Peak position |
|---|---|
| Australian singles chart | 14 |
| Belgian singles chart | 5 |
| Canadian RPM Top Singles chart | 3 |
| Netherlands (Dutch Top 40) | 8 |
| Netherlands (Single Top 100) | 7 |
| Finland (Suomen virallinen singlelista) | 24 |
| French singles chart | 15 |
| Germany Singles Chart | 24 |
| Malaysia Singles Chart | 9 |
| New Zealand (Listener) | 10 |
| Quebec (ADISQ) | 4 |
| South Africa (Springbok Radio SA Top 20) | 18 |
| UK Singles Chart | 29 |
| US Billboard Hot 100 | 6 |
| US Cash Box Top 100 | 7 |

=== Year-end charts ===
| Chart (1967) | Position |
|---|---|
| Canadian RPM Top Singles chart | 82 |
| Netherlands | 64 |
| US Billboard Hot 100 | 83 |

== All Seeing I version ==
"Beat Goes On"

Single by All Seeing I

from the album Pickled Eggs and Sherbet
- B-side: "Booty in the I"
- Released: 1997
- Length: 4:03
- Label: Earth, FFRR
- Songwriter: Sonny Bono

All Seeing I singles chronology
| "I Walk" (1997) | "Beat Goes On" (1997) | "Walk Like a Panther" (1998) |

Music video
- "The All Seeing I - Beat Goes On (Official Music Video)" on YouTube

In 1997, British electronic music group All Seeing I released a version sampling the vocals from the Buddy Rich version. When re-released in 1998, it peaked at number 11 on the UK Singles Chart and No. 1 on the UK Dance Singles Chart. It also reached the top 40 in Scotland and New Zealand.

All Seeing I also produced a cover version of the song for Britney Spears in November 1998, as the last track on her debut album, ...Baby One More Time.

== Other versions ==
- In 1967, the American jazz musician Buddy Rich performed a version on his Big Swing Face album, with his daughter Cathy Rich on vocals, arranged by Shorty Rogers.
- In 1968, Vanilla Fudge included a version of it on their album The Beat Goes On, which they released that year.
- In 1982, an electro cover version was released by Orbit featuring Carol Hall with production by Don Was. It became a substantial dance club hit in January 1983.
- An Australian version, produced by former Skyhooks guitarist Red Symons, became a Top 30 hit in 1983; it was recorded by Melbourne cabaret duo the Globos, which featured singers Wendy De Waal and Mark Trevorrow, the latter of whom later gained renown for his comedic alter-ego Bob Downe.
- The song was covered by Giant Sand on their 2002 album Cover Magazine.
- The song was covered by Firewater on their 2004 album Songs We Should Have Written.
