= Sonny & Cher =

American pop and entertainment duo

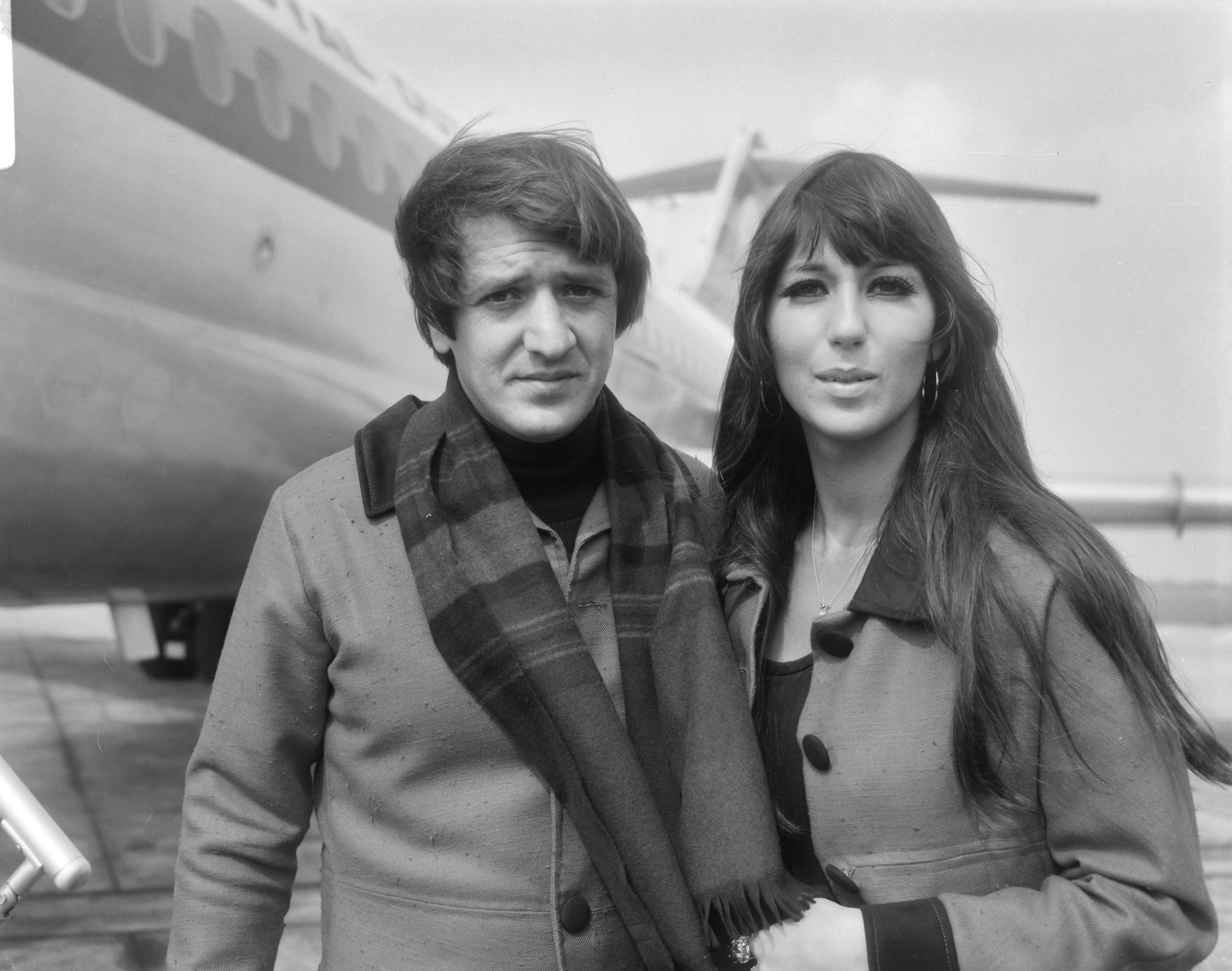
- Sonny & Cher at Schiphol Airport, Netherlands, 1966

Background information
- Origin: Los Angeles, California, U.S.
- Genres: Pop; pop rock; folk; rock
- Years active: 1964–1977 (Note: One-off reunions in 1979 and 1987.)
- Labels: Vault (1964); Reprise (1964–1965); Atco/Atlantic (1965–1967); MCA/Kapp (1971–1974); Warner Bros. (1977)
- Past members: Sonny Bono †; Cher

Sonny & Cher were an American pop and entertainment duo composed of husband-and-wife Sonny Bono and Cher. Rising to fame in the mid-1960s, the pair became one of the decade's most recognizable acts with a string of hit singles, including "Baby Don't Go", "I Got You Babe", "But You're Mine", "What Now My Love" and "The Beat Goes On".

The couple began their career as R&B backing singers for record producer Phil Spector. Their debut album, Look at Us (1965), established them as major figures in the folk-rock and pop scenes, while their distinctive fashion sense and countercultural style made them icons of the era. Signing with Atco Records, they released three studio albums in the 1960s, as well as the soundtrack recordings for two movies, Good Times (1967) and Chastity (1969). After their early chart success, their music career stalled in the late 1960s. In 1972, the duo returned to the studio and released two albums under the MCA/Kapp Records label, achieving another hit song, "A Cowboy's Work Is Never Done". In the 1970s, they transitioned into television, starring in the popular variety programs The Sonny & Cher Comedy Hour (1971–1974) and The Sonny & Cher Show (1976–1977), which solidified their status as household names.

Following their divorce in 1975 and the end of their professional relationship in 1977, Cher went on to a highly successful career as a solo singer and actress, while Sonny Bono was eventually elected to Congress as a Republican U.S. representative from California.

Sonny & Cher were nominated for two Grammy Awards and sold over 40 million records worldwide. They were inducted to the Hollywood Walk of Fame in 1998, following Sonny's death in a skiing accident. Rolling Stone ranked them No. 18 on its list of the 20 Greatest Duos of All Time.

== Career ==
=== 1962–1964: The origin and career development ===
Cheryl Sarkisian first met Salvatore Bono in a Los Angeles coffee shop in November 1962, when she was sixteen. Eleven years her senior, Bono was working for record producer Phil Spector at Gold Star Studios in Hollywood. The two became best friends, eventual lovers, and had an unofficial wedding in 1964. They were later legally wed after the birth of their child in 1969.

Through Bono, Cher started as a session singer, and sang backup on several of Spector's classic recordings, including "Be My Baby" by the Ronettes, "You've Lost That Loving Feeling" by The Righteous Brothers and Darlene Love's "A Fine, Fine Boy". In Darlene Love's recording, the listener can clearly hear Cher and Sonny close to the mic (along with Love, who recorded her own backing vocals). With Bono continuing to write, arrange, and produce the songs, the couple's first incarnation was as the duo "Caesar and Cleo". They released some singles in 1964, including "The Letter", with Vault Records, and "The Letter", "Do You Wanna Dance" and "Love Is Strange", with Reprise Records.

In September 1964, they released "Baby Don't Go" under the name of Sonny & Cher, which became their first regional hit. The song was later included on the 1965 Reprise compilation Baby Don't Go – Sonny & Cher and Friends, which also included songs from artists such as Bill Medley, The Lettermen and The Blendells.

=== 1965–1967: Chart success ===
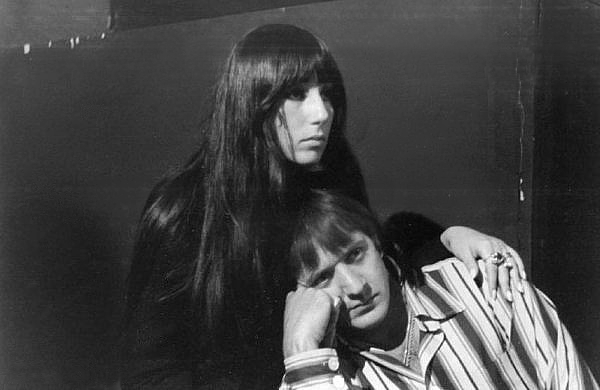
Sonny & Cher during a rehearsal break at Rediffusion Television's Wembley studios on May 26, 1966

The duo released their first album Look at Us in the summer of 1965. The album contained the number one single "I Got You Babe". Look at Us peaked at number two on the Billboard chart for eight weeks in the later part of 1965.

Sonny & Cher made their first promotional tour of Britain in the first two weeks of August 1965. The tour was organized and overseen by Larry Page, co-manager of the English rock band the Kinks, who met Cher a month earlier while she finished recording her debut album and while the Kinks toured America. Page and Brian Sommerville, the Kinks' publicist, quickly signed to be Sonny & Cher's European business manager and British publicist, respectively. During their two weeks in Britain, Sonny & Cher primarily appeared on British television and radio, but they also performed at the 100 Club in central London on August 5.

The couple appeared on many of the top television shows of the era, including The Ed Sullivan Show, American Bandstand, Where The Action Is, Hollywood A Go-Go, Hollywood Palace, Hullabaloo, Beat Club, Shindig!, Ready Steady Go! and Top of the Pops. They also appeared as themselves in the film Wild on the Beach, singing "It's Gonna Rain". On their first album, Bono also displayed his political interest long before running for Congress in the lyrics of the song, "The Revolution Kind".

By September 1965, their album Look at Us had reportedly sold a million copies, and Sonny & Cher had become widely recognized for their trendsetting style and signature long hair. They often wore colorful custom-made, coordinating outfits, and Cher was said to own more than 100 pairs of bell-bottoms. Their rising fame led to photo features in Vogue and Life. Following the album's success, they purchased a $75,000 one-bedroom home in the Encino neighborhood of the San Fernando Valley in October 1965.

They released their second studio album, The Wondrous World of Sonny & Chér, in April 1966, which peaked at number 34. At one point, they had five songs in the US Billboard top 50 simultaneously, a feat equaled only by the Beatles and Elvis Presley. Together they had become, according to Time magazine's Ginia Bellafante, rock's "it" couple. Periodic solo releases by Cher continued during this period, including major successes with "Bang Bang (My Baby Shot Me Down)", and Burt Bacharach & Hal David's theme from "Alfie" (as heard in the motion picture Alfie, as well as a single release), both in 1966. Because they sided with the young people being harassed on the Sunset Strip during the Sunset Strip curfew riots; they were removed from their promised position of honor in the Tournament of Roses Parade in January 1967.

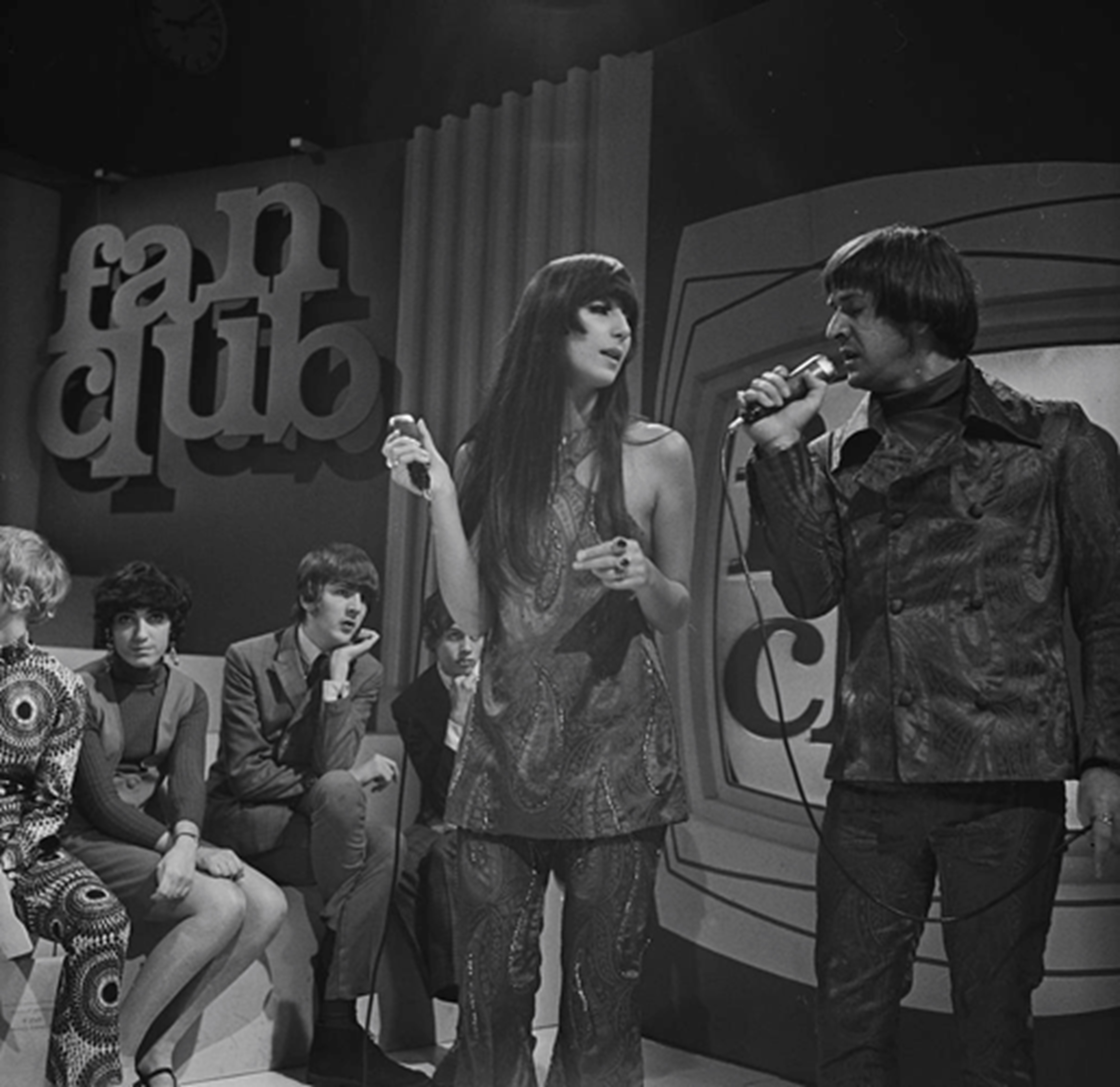
Sonny & Cher (Dutch TV, 1967)

In 1967, Sonny and Cher released their third album, In Case You're In Love. It peaked at number 45 in the U.S. charts. It contained two hit singles, both written by Bono, "The Beat Goes On" (No. 6 on the Billboard Hot 100) and "Little Man" (No. 21 on the Billboard Hot 100). "Little Man" became the duo's biggest hit in Europe, surpassing "I Got You Babe"; it reached the top ten in Belgium, France, Germany, the Netherlands, Sweden and the UK. Its parent LP, "In Case You're In Love," also produced "The Beat Goes On," which remains today a constant reminder of the pair's greatness.

In 1967, the pair bought a 34-room Bel-Air estate on Cloud Road for $250,000, acquiring the property from actor Tony Curtis.

=== 1967–1969: Film career and career woes ===
In an attempt to capitalize on the duo's initial success, Bono speedily arranged a film project for the duo to star in, but the 1967 feature, Good Times, was a major bomb, despite the efforts of fledgling director William Friedkin and co-star George Sanders. After Good Times flopped in 1968, Columbia Pictures immediately sold rights to their intended follow-up film Speedway to MGM. The couple were replaced by Elvis Presley and Nancy Sinatra. In 1969, another film, Chastity, starring Cher, written and produced by Sonny, was also a commercial bomb.

Sonny and Cher's career had stalled by 1968 as album sales quickly dried up. Their gentle, easy-listening pop sound and drug-free life had become unpopular in an era increasingly consumed with the psychedelic rock of the evolving landscape of American pop culture during the late 1960s. "Hippies thought we were square, squares thought we were hippies," Cher later recalled.

Bono decided to forge ahead, carving a new career for the duo in Las Vegas resorts, where they sharpened their public persona with Cher as the wise-cracking, glamorous singer, and Bono as the good-natured recipient of her insults. In reality, Bono controlled every aspect of their act, from the musical arrangements to the joke-writing. While success was slow to come, their luck improved when psychedelic rock started going out of style by 1970 in the wake of a number of "acid casualties" in the genre, bringing drug-free acts such as theirs back into vogue. Network TV talent scouts attended one of the couple's Las Vegas shows and determined the act had potential appeal for a variety series.

Sonny and Cher welcomed their first and only child together, Chastity Bono—named after Cher's film—on March 4, 1969.

=== 1970–1977: TV success, Cher goes solo and divorce ===
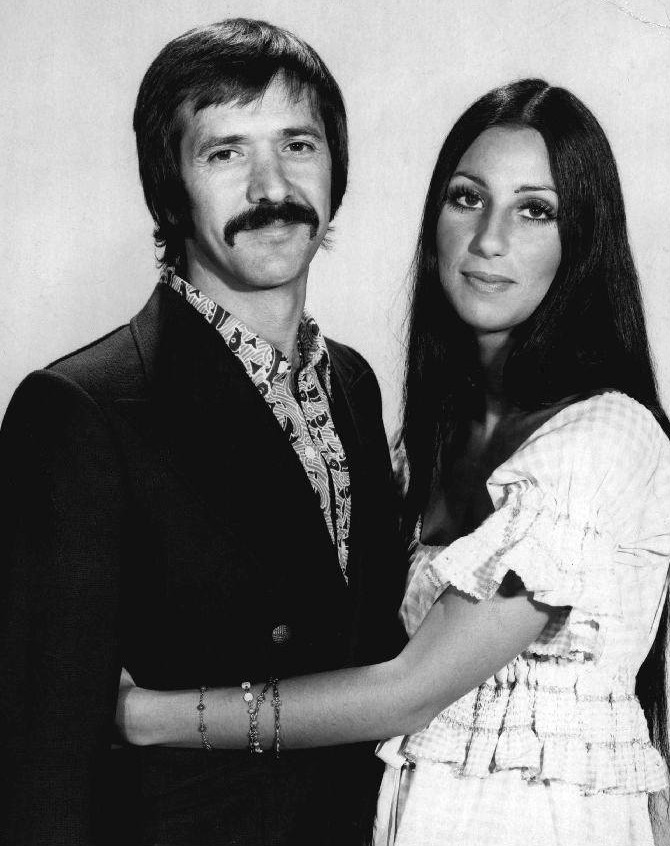
Publicity photo of Sonny & Cher in 1971

In 1970, Sonny and Cher starred in their first television special, The Nitty Gritty Hour, a mixture of slapstick comedy, skits, and live music. The appearance was a critical success, which led to numerous guest spots on other television shows. They also appeared in The New Scooby-Doo Movies as guest stars.

Sonny and Cher caught the eye of CBS head of programming Fred Silverman while guest-hosting The Merv Griffin Show, and Silverman offered the duo their own variety show. The Sonny & Cher Comedy Hour debuted in 1971 as a summer replacement series. The show returned to prime time later that year and was an immediate hit, quickly reaching the Top 10. The show received 15 Emmy Award nominations during its run, winning one for direction, throughout its initial four seasons on CBS.

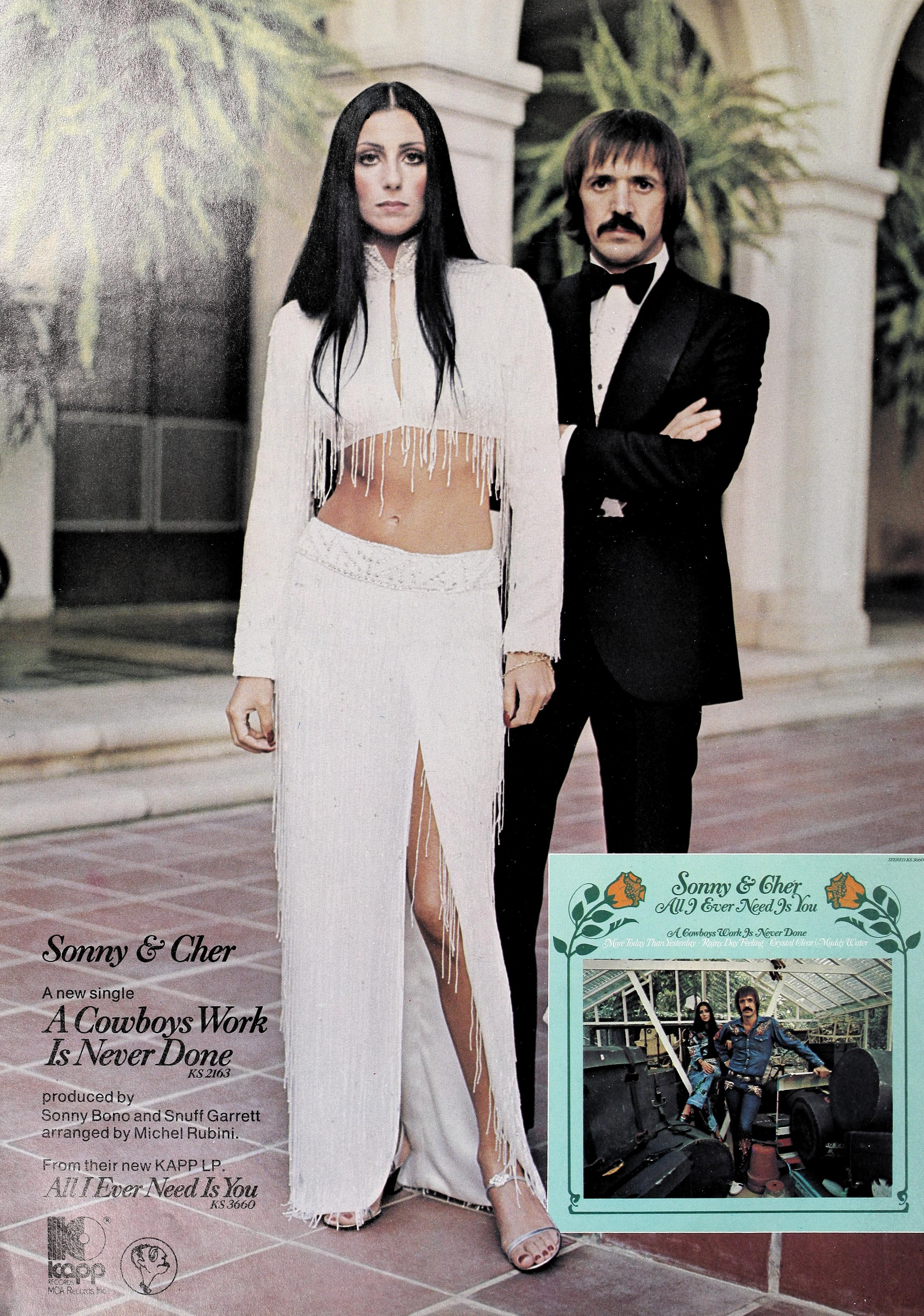
Cashbox advertisement, February 12, 1972

Sonny and Cher's dialogues on the show were patterned after the successful nightclub routines of Louis Prima and Keely Smith: the happy-go-lucky husband squelched by a tart remark from the unamused wife. The show featured a stock company of zany comedians, including Teri Garr, Freeman King, Ted Ziegler, Billy Van and Murray Langston (later The Unknown Comic on The Gong Show). One sketch satirizing CBS's detective show Cannon and its portly star William Conrad was so successful that Sonny and Cher staged several follow-ups, with Tony Curtis as "Detective Fat". Everybody in these sketches wore wide-waisted "fat suits" (similar to hoop skirts), so Detective Fat and his clients and his suspects would spend most of the time bumping each other and bouncing across the crowded room.

The duo also revived their recording career, releasing the album All I Ever Need Is You, and charting two more top ten hits: "All I Ever Need Is You", and "A Cowboy's Work Is Never Done" in 1972. Around this time, Cher had become a major star on her own, due in part of the success of the singles "Gypsies Tramps and Thieves" and "Half-Breed", both of which reached number one on the pop charts.

In 1972, Sonny and Cher bought actor Tony Curtis' Owlwood Estate—a 12,600-square-foot Tuscan-style mansion in Holmby Hills, Los Angeles—for $750,000. Although their professional collaboration was successful, Cher later wrote in her memoir that Bono's controlling behavior left her feeling "trapped" in what she viewed as a "loveless marriage". In 1972, while the two were working in Las Vegas and Bono's mood swings had become increasingly difficult, Cher hit an emotional breaking point. She stood on her hotel balcony and briefly thought about ending her life as a way out of the marriage.

By the third season of the Sonny & Cher Comedy Hour (1974), the marriage of Sonny and Cher was falling apart; the duo separated later that year. The show imploded, while still rating in the top 10 and the couple had a highly publicized divorce. Cher won a Golden Globe Award for Best Performance By an Actress in a Television Series – Musical or Comedy for The Sonny & Cher Comedy Hour in 1974.

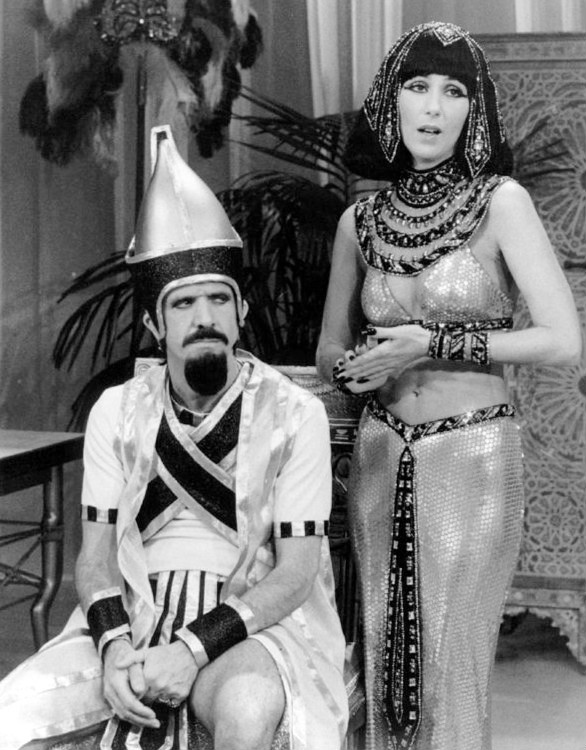
Scene from an Egyptian soap opera skit on The Sonny and Cher Show, 1977

Bono launched his own show, The Sonny Comedy Revue, in the fall of 1974, retaining the "Sonny and Cher" troupe of comedians and writers. Cher also announced plans to star in a new variety series of her own. Critics predicted that Bono would be the big winner with a solo comedy vehicle, and held little hope for Cher's more musical showcase. After only six weeks, however, Bono's show was abruptly canceled.

The Cher show debuted as an elaborate, all-star television special on February 16, 1975, featuring Flip Wilson, Bette Midler, and special guest Elton John. Cloris Leachman and Jack Albertson both won Emmy Awards for their appearances as guest-stars a few weeks later, and the series received four additional Emmy nominations that year. The first season ranked in the Top 25 of the year-end ratings.

Sonny and Cher's divorce was finalized on June 26, 1975. During the divorce proceedings, Cher discovered that Bono had structured their business affairs in a way that left her with little ownership or financial control. Cher Enterprises, the corporation through which their earnings were handled, was 95% owned by Bono and 5% by their attorney, Irwin Spiegel, despite the company bearing Cher's name. Cher was an employee of the corporation rather than an owner and was contractually restricted from working independently without Bono's involvement. Cher later recalled that she could not access money earned by the company or sign checks without Bono or Spiegel's authorization. The arrangement left Cher financially dependent on Bono and unable to pursue work independently without his approval.

They went their separate ways until Cher attended the opening of one of Bono's restaurants in something of a reconciliation. The Sonny & Cher Show returned in 1976, even though they were no longer married (the duo "reunited" with a humorous handshake). In 1976, Mego Toys also released a line of toys and dolls, in the likeness of Sonny & Cher. The release of these fashion dolls coincided with the popularity of The Sonny & Cher Show. By 1977, the variety television genre was falling out of fashion, the show ended, and Sonny and Cher finally parted ways for good.

=== 1978–1999: Later career and reunions ===
Sonny Bono went on to an acting career and later entered politics, eventually becoming a member of the U.S. House of Representatives. Cher went on to become a Grammy Award-winning solo singer and an Academy Award-winning actress.

The couple made two surprise impromptu reunion performances: the first on The Mike Douglas Show in the spring of 1979, singing a medley of "United We Stand" and "Without You", and the second on November 13, 1987, on Late Night with David Letterman where they performed their hit song "I Got You Babe"; it turned out to be the last time the two would perform together.

In early 1999, And the Beat Goes On: The Sonny and Cher Story, directed by David Burton Morris and starring Jay Underwood and Renee Faia, was broadcast on ABC. The TV movie was based on the autobiography of Bono, and focuses on the relationship between the couple during the early 1960s to their divorce in the mid-1970s. This movie was also nominated for two Emmy Awards.

== Bono's death, music copyright ==
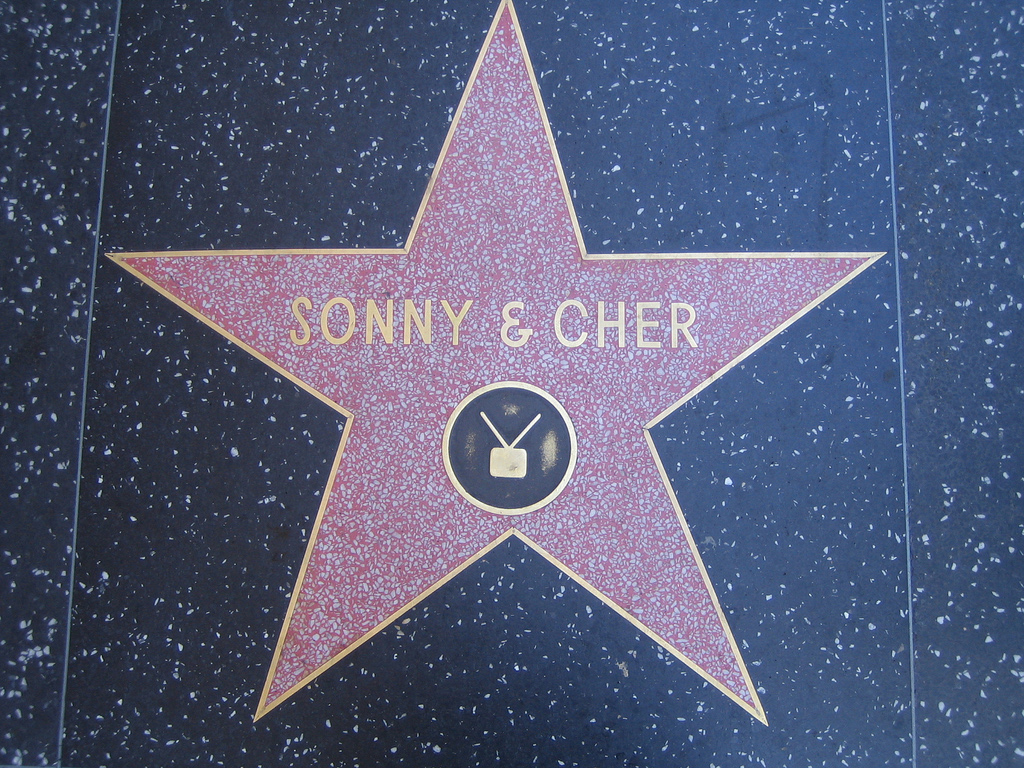
Sonny and Cher's star on Hollywood Walk of Fame

On January 5, 1998, Bono died of injuries from hitting a tree while skiing at Heavenly Ski Resort in Lake Tahoe. He was 62 years old. Bono's death came just days after Michael Kennedy died in a similar accident. Bono's widow, Mary, was selected to fill the remainder of his congressional term, and was re-elected in her own right, serving until she was defeated for re-election in 2012. She continues to champion many of her late husband's causes, including the ongoing fight as how to best save the Salton Sea.

The funeral, unbeknownst to Cher, was broadcast live on CNN. She gave a tearful eulogy, after which the attendees sang the song "The Beat Goes On". In front of millions, Cher tearfully and effusively praised Bono, calling him "the most unforgettable character I've ever met". His final resting place is Desert Memorial Park in nearby Cathedral City, California, the same cemetery in which Frank Sinatra was laid to rest later that same year. The epitaph on Bono's headstone reads: "And The Beat Goes On".

In 1998, Sonny and Cher received a star on the Hollywood Walk of Fame for Television. Cher appeared at the event with Mary Bono, who accepted the award on behalf of her late husband. Cher paid tribute to Bono in the CBS special Sonny and Me: Cher Remembers, calling her grief "something I never plan to get over". During the same year, Cher also released her twenty-second album Believe that was highly influenced by Bono's death, and in the booklet Cher wrote "In memory of Son".

When Cher and Bono divorced, they agreed to split revenue from the songs recorded together. When Bono died, one-third of his interest passed to wife Mary Bono, and one-sixth interests were split amongst his children. Cher sued UMG in 2009, claiming she and Bono's heirs were owed $5,000,000 in "hidden" royalties.

In May 2024, Cher won a legal dispute against Mary Bono over royalties from her recordings with Sonny. Under a 1978 divorce settlement, Cher was entitled to half the publishing revenue, but Mary Bono stopped payments in 2021 after invoking a copyright termination clause. A federal judge ruled that the royalties were a separate contractual obligation and ordered her to pay Cher around $418,000 in withheld earnings.

== Legacy and achievements ==
In 1965, Cashbox magazine described Sonny & Cher, along with the Rolling Stones and the Beatles, as "global stars" whose success in both the US and the UK demonstrated that national origin was no longer a barrier to international stardom. The duo competed successfully with the British Invasion and Motown sounds of the era. Author Joseph Murrells described them as "leading exponents of the rock-folk-message type of song", blending rock instrumentation, folk themes and protest lyrics, while The Guardian called their music "the sound of the growing 60s counterculture".

Between 1965 and 1972, Sonny & Cher charted ten Billboard Hot 100 top 40 singles, including five top 10 hits: "I Got You Babe", "Baby Don't Go", "The Beat Goes On", "All I Ever Need Is You," and "A Cowboy's Work Is Never Done". At one point, they had five songs simultaneously in the top 50—a feat equaled only by the Beatles and Elvis Presley.

=== Awards and honors ===
Sonny & Cher's breakthrough single "I Got You Babe" (1965) is a Grammy Hall of Fame inductee and appeared on Rolling Stone's 2003 list of the "500 Greatest Songs of All Time".

The Sonny & Cher Comedy Hour received numerous Emmy nominations; Director Art Fisher won for Outstanding Directing for a Variety Series in 1972. Cher won a Golden Globe Award for Best Actress – Television Series Musical or Comedy in 1974.

Sonny and Cher received the following honors:

- 1966: Grammy nomination for Best New Artist
- 1972: Grammy nomination for Best Pop Duo/Group Performance
- 1998: Received a star on the Hollywood Walk of Fame
- 2015: Ranked No. 18 on Rolling Stone's list of the 20 Greatest Duos of All Time

=== In pop culture ===
The 2024 film Joker: Folie à Deux featured a variety show sequence that has Joaquin Phoenix and Lady Gaga portray Joker and Harley Quinn as a homicidal version of Sonny & Cher, as a musical tribute.

== Filmography ==
Film
1965	Wild on the Beach	Themselves	
1967	Good Times	Themselves/Various characters	
Television
Year	Title	Role	Notes
1967	The Man from U.N.C.L.E.	Jerry and Ramona	Cameo, in the third season's episode "The Hot Number Affair"
1970	The Sonny & Cher Nitty Gritty Hour	Themselves	Television Special, one episode
1971–1974	The Sonny & Cher Comedy Hour	Themselves/Various characters	Three Seasons; Nominated – Emmy Award, 19 nominations
1972	The New Scooby-Doo Movies	Themselves/Dubbing	Voice in the episode "The Secret of Shark Island"
1974	The Sonny Comedy Revue	Himself/Various characters	One Season; Nominated – Emmy Award, 1 nomination
1975–1976	The Cher Show	Herself/Various characters	Two Seasons; Nominated – Emmy Award, 11 nominations
1976–1977	The Sonny & Cher Show	Themselves/Various characters	Two Seasons; Nominated – Emmy Award, 3 nominations
1998	Sonny and Me: Cher Remembers	Herself	Television Special, one episode; Tribute to Bono

== Discography ==
- Look at Us (1965)
- The Wondrous World of Sonny & Chér (1966)
- In Case You're in Love (1967)
- All I Ever Need Is You (1972)
- Mama Was a Rock and Roll Singer, Papa Used to Write All Her Songs (1973)

== See also ==
- Supercouple
- List of artists who reached number one in the United States
- Lists of Billboard number-one singles
