= Illimitatamente =

Studio album by Umberto Alongi
- Released: 24 November 2017
- Studio: Auditoria Records
- Genre: Pop
- Label: Auditoria Records

Umberto Alongi chronology
3 minuti (2016)	Illimitatamente (2017)

Singles from Illimitatamente
- 1. "Ragazzi Italiani" Released: 12 June 2017

Illimitatamente is the third studio album by singer-songwriter Umberto Alongi, released for digital distribution by Auditoria Records on 24 November 2017.

== Recording ==
Illimitatamente was recorded in Fino Mornasco, Italy. It features many collaborations: Massimo Scoca (bass player) (Stewart Copeland, Dee Dee Bridgewater, Bryan Adams, John Martyn, Level 42, Bob Geldof, Tito Gomez (European Tour), John Davis, Linda Wesley, Paul Jeffrey, Tullio De Piscopo, Gatto Panceri, Enzo Iannacci, Enrico Ruggeri, Lucio Dalla and many more); Giordano Colombo (drums player) (Franco Battiato, Antony and the Johnson, Gianna Nannini, Giorgia, Alessandra Amoroso, Valerio Scanu etc.); Antonio "Aki" Chindamo (Caterina Valente, Rockets, Marco Ferradini, Riccardo Fogli, Paola Turci, Andrea Braido); Andrea Gentile (guitar player) (Raphael Gualazzi, Giovanni Caccamo, Deborah Iurato, Ermal Meta, Benji e Fede, Marco Carta, Simone Tomassini, Paolo Meneguzzi, Niccolò Agliardi);

This album was written with Andrea Zuppini (Fabio Concato, Eros Ramazzotti, Rossana Casale, Fiorella Mannoia, Paola e Chiara, Alex Baroni, Gigi D’Alessio, Patty Pravo), and Matteo Di Franco (Mina (for "Non si alza il vento") Celentano, Andrea Bocelli, Patty Pravo).

== Track listing ==
1. "Illimitatamente"
2. "Non si alza il vento"
3. "Fino in fondo"
4. "Ragazzi Italiani"
5. "Non si alza il vento (Acoustic Version)"
6. "Il tuo viaggio"
7. "Stai con me"
8. "Oh anima (feat. Valentino Alfano)"
9. "Il tuo viaggio (Acoustic Version)"
10. "Tempo ne avrò"
11. "Stai con me (Acoustic Version)"

== Personnel ==
- Umberto Alongi – Vocal
- Massimo Scoca – Bass
- Antonio Chindamo – Keyboards
- Andrea Gentile – Guitars
- Giordano Colombo – Drums
- Juana Cali – Backing vocals
- Corrado Salemi - Backing vocals

Production

- Antonio "Aki" Chindamo - Auditoria Records
