= 3 minuti =

Studio album by Umberto Alongi
- Released: 2 December 2016
- Genre: Pop
- Label: iM Digital

Umberto Alongi chronology
Come Stai (2015)	3 minuti (2016)	Illimitatamente (2017)

Singles from 3 minuti
- 1. "Lei non c'è più" Released: 15 July 2016

3 minuti is the second studio album by singer-songwriter Umberto Alongi, released for digital distribution by iM Digital Records on 2 December 2016.

== Recording ==
3 minuti was recorded over 6 months in Lugano with members of Simone Tomassini's band (Roberto Colombo and Riccardo Di Filippo) and Matia Bazar (Angelo Quatrale). It was mixed by Robb Hutzal. This album has been written with Valentino Alfano (for "3 minuti") Mina, Matteo Di Franco (for "Qui") Celentano, Andrea Bocelli, Patty Pravo and Andrea Zuppini (for "Qui") Alex Baroni, Fabio Concato.

== Track listing ==
1. "Guardami ancora"
2. "3 minuti"
3. "Assurde gelosie"
4. "Vivila"
5. "Venere"
6. "Ora e sempre"
7. "Non dici niente"
8. "Qui"
9. "I can just be me"
10. "In mezzo ai sogni"

== Personnel ==
- Umberto Alongi – Vocal
- Angelo Quatrale – Bass
- Roberto Colombo – Keyboards
- Riccardo Di Filippo – Guitars
- Christian Daniel – Drums
- Chiara Giudici – Backing vocals

Production

- Robb Hutzal – Mixing
