= Bye Bye Patty =

Live album by Patty Pravo
- Released: 19 February 1997
- Genre: Pop rock
- Length: 71:59
- Language: Italian
- Label: Pensiero Stupendo; Epic
- Producer: Nando Sepe

Patty Pravo chronology
Ideogrammi (1994)	Bye Bye Patty (1997)	Notti, guai e libertà (1998)

Bye Bye Patty is the first live album by Italian singer Patty Pravo, released in 1997 by Epic Records.

== Overview ==
The material was recorded live between 16 and 24 January 1997 during concerts in Bergamo, Milan, Florence and Rome. It consists of sixteen songs, most of which come from the earliest years of Pravo's career. The only studio recording is the opening track "...E dimmi che non vuoi morire" which Patty performed at the 47th Sanremo Music Festival in February 1997 and won the critics' award. The song was released as the first single and met with commercial success. A new, rock-influenced version of "Pensiero stupendo" was performed as an encore, followed by nearly two minutes of silence and a secret recording in which a little girl named Federica sings the chorus of "...E dimmi che non vuoi morire". "Pensiero stupendo '97" was released as the second single from the album.

Bye Bye Patty was a top 5 chart hit in Italy on the back of Patty's acclaimed Sanremo performance. It has reportedly sold 250,000 copies by October 1997, and eventually more than 300,000 copies. A video version of the album was released later that year on VHS and DVD, titled Bye Bye Patty – Patty Pravo Live al Piper. It consists of live footage from the show at the Piper Club in Rome.

In 2024, the album was re-issed on a coloured magenta vinyl in a limited 2-LP format.

== Track listing ==
1. "...E dimmi che non vuoi morire" – 4:12
2. "Intro" – 1:10
3. "Ragazzo triste" – 2:58
4. "Qui e là" – 3:12
5. "Se perdo te" – 2:52
6. "La bambola" – 3:57
7. "Pazza idea" – 4:41
8. "Morire tra le viole" – 3:19
9. "Pensiero stupendo" – 4:12
10. "Tutt'al più" – 4:26
11. "Il paradiso" – 3:31
12. "Poesia" – 4:13
13. "Ragazza passione" – 4:55
14. "La mela in tasca" – 3:51
15. "Non andare via" – 4:04
16. "Col tempo (Avec temps)" – 3:48
17. "A modo mio (My Way)" – 5:29
18. "Pensiero stupendo ('97)" – 7:05

== Charts ==
Chart (1997)	Peak position
Italy (FIMI)	3
Italy (Musica e dischi)	4
Europe (European Top 100 Albums)	32
