= Umberto Alongi =

Swiss Italian singer and songwriter

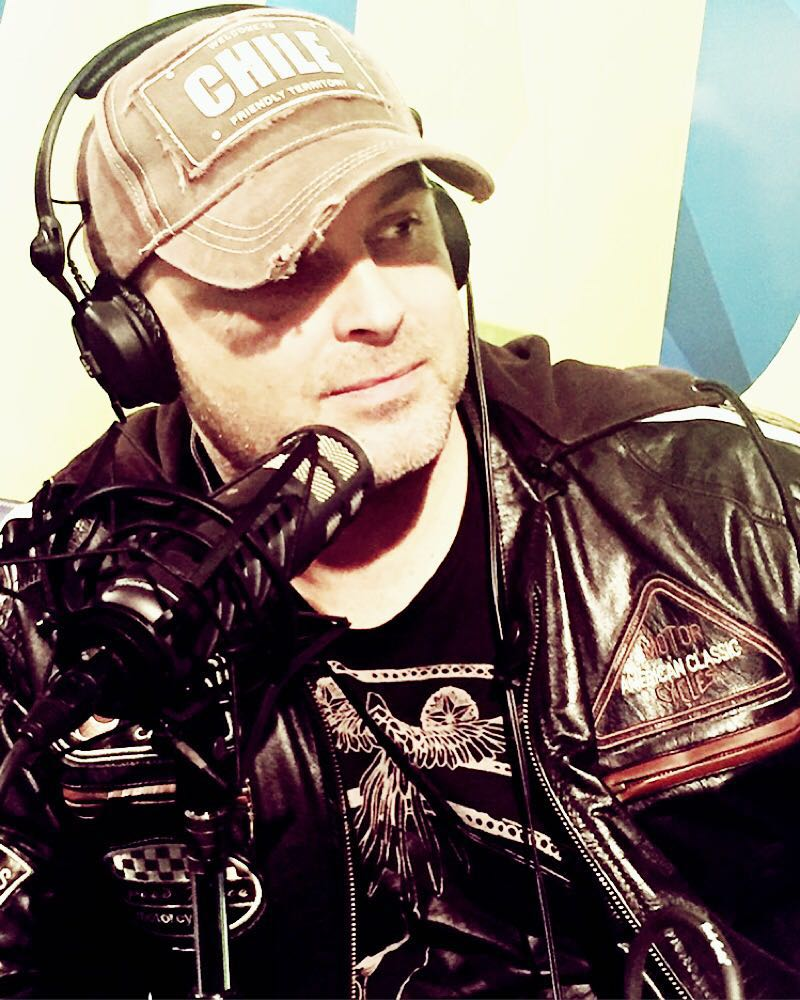
- Umberto Alongi on Radio Fiume Ticino

Background information
- Born: 26 July 1976 (age 50); Palermo, Italy
- Genre: Pop
- Occupation: Singer-songwriter
- Instrument: Vocals
- Years active: 2000–present
- Label: Latlantide
- Website: Official website

Umberto Alongi (born 26 July 1976) is a Swiss Italian singer and songwriter.

== Biography ==
After living and sharing his time for years between Italy (where he was born) and Switzerland, beginning in 2014 he has been producing two solo albums through the record labels Im Digital, Auditoria Records and with Me & U Records and Artists Management based in London. Alongi sings in Italian, Spanish and English in addition to playing guitar.

As of September 2015, he is included in the Swiss pre-selection for the Eurovision Song Contest 2016. In October 2015, he participated in the Ghedi Festival for unreleased songs as the only Swiss male artist in the competition. He reached the semi-finals by beating a selection of 300 artists with the song "Come stai".

The song "Come stai" written by Marco Giorgi (Mariadele) was launched on the radio on 30 November 2015. The song reached the Italian airplay ranking in 7th place out of the 10 tracks most broad-cast by Italian radio and the 72nd place in the international top 100. The song was produced by the record company Latlantide, the company with which Alongi will produce his new album.

He has collaborated with Valentino Alfano (Mina), Marco Elfo Buongiovanni (Cugini di campagna), Matteo Di Franco (Adriano Celentano, Patty Pravo, Tullio De Piscopo) and Andrea Zuppini (Fabio Concato, Alex Baroni, Fiorella Mannoia).

Umberto Alongi was the founding member of Diesel 23 in Lugano in 2010, with whom he performed for five years until the band broke up in early 2015. With Diesel 23, he released the album Last Chance through the Music-Mad Records label.

In 2016, he was the founder of the charity project "Contesti" in favor of OTAF Foundation with the participation of six other Swiss Italian artists. For this project he composed with Valentino Alfano a song named "Noi siamo qui".

As of September 2016, he is included in the Swiss selection for the Eurovision song contest 2017 with a new song "I can just be me". This song is candidate for "Die grosse entscheidungsshow" and it is included on his new album entitled 3 minuti.

A new album titled Illimitatamente was released in November 2017 in Fino Mornasco Italy, played with Massimo Scoca (bass player) Stewart Copeland, Dee Dee Bridgewater, Bryan Adams, John Martyn, Level 42, Bob Geldof, Tito Gomez (European Tour), John Davis, Linda Wesley, Paul Jeffrey, Tullio De Piscopo, Gatto Panceri, Enzo Iannacci, Enrico Ruggeri, Lucio Dalla and many more); Giordano Colombo (drums player) (Franco Battiato, Antony and the Johnson, Gianna Nannini, Giorgia, Alessandra Amoroso, Valerio Scanu etc); Antonio "Aki" Chindamo (Caterina Valente, Rockets, Marco Ferradini, Riccardo Fogli, Paola Turci, Andrea Braido); Andrea Gentile (guitar player) (Raphael Gualazzi, Giovanni Caccamo, Deborah Iurato, Ermal Meta, Benji e Fede, Marco Carta, Simone Tomassini, Paolo Meneguzzi, Niccolò Agliardi).

The last single "Pura Follia" was launched on the radio on 18 June 2018. The song reached the Italian airplay ranking in 1st place out of the 10 tracks most broad-cast by Italian radio.

In 2019, he released the new album "Se amore c'è", reaching the Italian airplay indie chart with the single "Con quanto c'è da fare".

The new studio album "Equidistanti" was launched in December 2020. The album was recorded at the Roxy Studio with the featurings of Kenya and AREA.

Alongi announces the recording of the new album and launches the new singles 'A due passi dal cielo' and 'Ora c'è il sole'. 'A due passi dal cielo' reaches number two in the Italian radio charts in its first week since its release.

Umberto Alongi announces the production of his upcoming album and releases preview singles. The first single of 2024 is titled "Una risposta non c'è".

== Collaborations ==
- Gaetano Capitano
- Antony Franceschi
- Marco Giorgi
- Valentino Alfano
- Marco Elfo Buongiovanni
- Andrea Zuppini
- Matteo Di Franco

== Selected discography ==
=== Studio albums ===
- 3 minuti – (Me&U Records – iM Digital) – 2016
- Illimitatamente – (Me&U Records – Auditoria Records)- 2017
- Se amore c'è – (Me&U Records)- 2019
- Equidistanti – (Me&U Records)- 2020

=== Singles ===
- Come il respiro – (Tunecore) – 2015
- Con un altro – (Me&U Records) – 2015
- Come stai – (Latlantide) – 2015
- Che Natale è – (Me&U Records) – 2015
- Lei non-c'è più (Latlantide) – 2016
- 3 minuti – (Me&U Records – iM Digital) – 2016
- Ragazzi Italiani – (Auditoria Records) – 2017
- Tempo ne avrò – (Me&U Records – Auditoria Records) – 2017
- Il futuro si è perso – (Me&U Records – Sony Music Publishing) – 2018
- Pura Follia – (Me&U Records) – 2018
- A due passi dal cielo - (Latlantide) - 2023
- Ora c'è il sole - (iMDSuisse) - 2023
- Una risposta non c'è - (Me&U Records) - 2023

=== Featuring ===
- I miss you – Diesel'23 – 2015
- Someone to love – Diesel'23 – 2015
- Noi siamo qui – Contesti – (Me&U Records) – 2016
- Oh Anima feat. Valentino Alfano – (Auditoria Records) – 2017

=== Spanish-language singles ===
- Abrazame – 2014
- Como estas – 2015

== Appearances ==
- Eurovision Song Contest – September 2015 – Switzerland Pre-selection
- Eurovision Song Contest – September 2016 – Switzerland Pre-selection
- Ghedi Festival – November 2015 – Semi-finalist
