= Alongi =

Alongi is an Italian surname, which literally refers to the town of Longi (formerly Alongi, Άλογκοι in Byzantine Greek) in the Metropolitan City of Messina, Sicily. Notable people with the surname include:

- Filippo Alongi (born 2000), Italian rugby union player
- Nicola Alongi (1863–1920), Sicilian socialist leader
- Philip Alongi, American news producer and opera singer
- Umberto Alongi (born 1976), Swiss Italian singer-songwriter
