= Incontro =

Studio album by Patty Pravo
- Released: 1975
- Genre: Pop
- Length: 37:55
- Language: Italian
- Label: RCA Italiana
- Producer: Gepy & Gepy

Patty Pravo chronology
Mai una signora (1974)	Incontro (1975)	Tanto (1976)

Incontro is the tenth studio album by Italian singer Patty Pravo, released in 1975 through RCA Italiana.

== Overview ==
For this album, Pravo chose composers with whom she has already had the opportunity to work: Francesco De Gregori ("Mercato dei fiori"), Antonello Venditti ("Le tue mani su di me"), Sergio Bardotti, Bruno Lauzi ("Roberto e l'aquilone"), Riccardo Del Turco ("Io grande io piccola"), as well as such lyricist as Carla Vistarini ("Eppure è amore", "Questo amore sbagliato") and Luigi Lopez. The record was produced by Italian singer Gepy & Gepy and reportedly recorded in only three days.

The title song was released as the only single off the album, with "Incontro" on side B, and reached number 6 on the Italian chart. The album itself was a top 5 seller in Italy.

== Track listing ==
Side A

1. "Incontro" (Giampiero Scalamogna, Sergio Bardotti, Maurizio Fabrizio) – 4:30
2. "Mercato dei fiori" (Francesco De Gregori) – 3:15
3. "Questo amore sbagliato" (Carla Vistarini, Luigi Lopez) – 3:49
4. "Stella cadente" (Franca Evangelisti, Fabio Massimo Cantini, Antonio Coggio) – 3:42
5. "Rispondi (Mandy)" (Giampiero Scalamogna, Sergio Bardotti, Cristiano Minellono, Scott English, Richard Kerr) – 3:19

Side B

1. "Io grande io piccola" (Giampiero Scalamogna, Sergio Bardotti, Rodolfo Bianchi, Riccardo Del Turco) – 4:04
2. "Roberto e l'aquilone" (Bruno Lauzi, Alberto Lucarelli, Silvano D'Auria) – 4:36
3. "Come un ponte sull'acqua che va (Can't Get It Out of My Head)" (Giampiero Scalamogna, Sergio Bardotti, Jeff Lynne) – 3:03
4. "Eppure è amore" (Carla Vistarini, Rodolfo Bianchi, Riccardo Del Turco) – 3:38
5. "Le tue mani su di me" (Antonello Venditti) – 4:09

== Personnel ==
- Patty Pravo – vocals
- Mario Scotti – bass
- Rodolfo Bianchi – flute
- Roberto Rosati – guitar
- Toto Torquati – keyboards
- Gepy & Gepy – keyboards, percussion, production
- Piero Mariani – percussion
- Carlo Felice Marcovecchio – percussion
- Maurizio Montanesi – recording

Credits are adapted from the album's liner notes.

== Charts ==
Chart performance for Incontro
Chart (1975)	Peak position
Italian Albums (Musica e dischi)	4
