= Notti, guai e libertà =

Studio album by Patty Pravo
- Released: April 1998
- Genre: Avant-pop; pop-rock
- Length: 54:11
- Language: Italian
- Label: Pensiero Stupendo; Sony Music
- Producer: Mauro Paoluzzi

Patty Pravo chronology
Bye Bye Patty (1997)	Notti, guai e libertà (1998)	Una donna da sognare (2000)

Professional ratings
Review scores
Source	Rating
Europopmusic.eu	5/5 stars
Raro!	Positive

Notti, guai e libertà (Italian for Nights, Trouble and Freedom) is a studio album by Italian singer Patty Pravo, released in 1998 by Sony Music.

== Overview ==
Most of the material on the album was written specially for Patty by some of the most renowned Italian songwriters, such as Franco Battiato, Ivano Fossati, Francesco Guccini, and Enrico Ruggeri, as well as young artists Alex Baroni and Rosario Di Bella.

"Les Etrangers" (French for "Strangers") is a cover of "Merci bon Dieu", written by Frantz Casseus and first released by Harry Belafonte on his 1957 album An Evening with Belafonte. An instrumental version of the song, "Des Etrangers", is included as a secret recording in track 10, following the final song and a one-minute silence. Only on vinyl editions of the album are the two recordings billed separately. "Les Etrangers" was released as the lead single accompanied by a music video filmed in a mine located in Cagliari, Sardinia. The song was performed at the Festivalbar with "Strada per un'altra città" (Italian for "Road to Another City") which in turn served as the second single, followed by "Emma Bovary" later in 1998. A remix of "Angelus" was released as the fourth and final single.

Notti, guai e libertà met with positive critical reception and is regarded one of Patty Pravo's best works. It also was a commercial success and entered the Italian charts at no. 5. The album sold 150,000 copies as of late 1998.

In 2025, the album was re-issed on a coloured marble vinyl in a limited 2-LP format, adding a remix of "Angelus" as a bonus track.

== Track listing ==
1. "Les Etrangers" (Harry Belafonte, Frantz Casseus, Mauro Paoluzzi, Enrico Papi, Lucio Dalla) – 5:09
2. "Strada per un'altra città" (Bruno Bergonzi, Michele Vicino, Enrico Ruggeri) – 5:09
3. "Emma Bovary" (Franco Battiato, Manlio Sgalambro) – 4:53
4. "Angelus" (Ivano Fossati) – 5:15
5. "Baby blu" (Mauro Paoluzzi, Luca Madonia, Vincenzo Incenzo) – 5:25
6. "Sylvian" (Nicoletta Strambelli, Mauro Paoluzzi, Adelio Cogliati) – 4:10
7. "Per un sogno vincente" (Mario Lavezzi, Oscar Avogadro) – 4:50
8. "Treno di panna" (Mauro Paoluzzi, Loredana Bertè, Roberto Vecchioni) – 5:21
9. "Una casa nuova" (Gaetano Curreri, Francesco Guccini) – 3:54
10. "Sweet Love" (Paul Buchanan, Rosario Di Bella, Alex Baroni) – 10:08

== Charts ==
Chart (1998)	Peak position
Italy (FIMI)	5
Italy (Musica e dischi)	11
Europe (European Top 100 Albums)	53
