= Oltre l'Eden... =

Studio album by Patty Pravo
- Released: 1989
- Genre: Pop
- Language: Italian
- Label: Fonit Cetra
- Producer: Paolo Dossena; Patty Pravo

Patty Pravo chronology
Pigramente signora (1988)	Oltre l'Eden... (1989)	Pazza idea eccetera eccetera... (1990)

Professional ratings
Review scores
Source	Rating
Europopmusic.eu	5/5 stars

Oltre l'Eden... (Italian for More Than Eden...) is a studio album by Italian singer Patty Pravo, released in 1989 by Fonit Cetra.

== Overview ==
Most of the material was co-written by Pravo, who also co-produced the album with Paolo Dossena. The final version of the album is substantially different from the original recordings, as label Fonit Cetra demanded that three songs, "Domani farò", "Tristezza moderna" and "Gocce", are removed, and significant changes to lyrics and arrangements of the other songs are made. "Tristezza moderna" was later reworked with the group Bandabardò and included on the 2004 album Nic-Unic.

No singles were released to promote the album, but Pravo performed most of its songs live on the Italian TV show D.O.C. in 1989. While the album failed to chart, it was met with critical acclaim, and is now regarded one of Pravo's best works. The singer herself named it one of her favourite albums, and "La viaggiatrice – Bisanzio" – one of her favourite songs.

== Track listing ==
Side A

1. "Oltre l'Eden..." (Giovanni Ullu, Patty Pravo) – 4:05
2. "Ragazza passione" (Paolo Dossena, Patty Pravo, Tony Carnevale) – 5:44
3. "Terra di nessuno" (Umberto Rivarola) – 4:28
4. "La viaggiatrice – Bisanzio" (Paolo Dossena, Patty Pravo, Tony Carnevale) – 4:27

Side B

1. "Giardino degli aranci" (Giovanni Ullu, Patty Pravo) – 3:22
2. "Cocci di chissà che cosa" (Giovanni Ullu, Patty Pravo) – 3:26
3. "Penelope" (Giovanni Ullu) – 3:13
4. "Un amore" (Giovanni Ullu) – 3:35
