= Pazza idea (album) =

Studio album by Patty Pravo
- Released: 1973
- Genre: Pop
- Label: RCA Italiana
- Producer: Paolo Dossena

Patty Pravo chronology
Sì... incoerenza (1972)	Pazza idea (1973)	Mai una signora (1974)

Professional ratings
Review scores
Source	Rating
Europopmusic.eu	4/5 stars

Pazza idea (Italian for 'Crazy Idea') is a studio album by Italian singer Patty Pravo, released in 1973 by RCA Italiana.

The material was written by Marco Luberti, Riccardo Cocciante, and Paolo Dossena, among others, and produced by Dossena. The album included the popular no. 1 single "Pazza idea" as well as the Italian cover of Lou Reed's "Walk on the Wild Side", titled "I giardini di Kensington". The LP turned out a huge commercial success, spending six consecutive weeks at no. 1 in Italy. It reportedly is Pravo's best-selling album to date. A Spanish-language version of the album, titled Una Locura, was released in Spain.

== Track listing ==
Side A

1. "Pazza idea" – 4:43
2. "Morire tra le viole" – 3:42
3. "Poesia" – 3:14
4. "Per gioco per amore" – 2:41

Side B

1. "Sono cosa tua" – 4:11
2. "Per simpatia" – 3:14
3. "I giardini di Kensington" – 3:43
4. "Limpidi pensieri" – 3:27

== Charts ==
Chart (1973)	Peak position
Italian Albums (Musica e dischi)	1

Chart (2017)	Peak position
Italian Vinyl Albums (FIMI)	9
