= Una donna da sognare =

Studio album by Patty Pravo
- Released: May 2000
- Genre: Pop-rock
- Length: 38:31
- Language: Italian
- Label: Pensiero Stupendo; Sony Music
- Producer: Vasco Rossi; Gaetano Curreri

Patty Pravo chronology
Notti, guai e libertà (1998)	Una donna da sognare (2000)	Radio Station (2002)

Professional ratings
Review scores
Source	Rating
DeBaser	3/5 stars
Grazia	Negative
Rockol	Mixed

Una donna da sognare is a studio album by Italian singer Patty Pravo, released in 2000 by Sony Music.

== Overview ==
Most of the songs on the album were co-written by two female Italian songwriters: Pia Tuccitto and Bettina Baldassari, and the final material was produced by Vasco Rossi and Gaetano Curreri. Rossi had collaborated with the singer on the 1997 hit single "...E dimmi che non vuoi morire".

Una donna da sognare was a top 10 success on the Italian albums chart, despite lukewarm critical reception. The title track served as the lead single and reached no.11 in Italy. It was followed by two more singles, "Una mattina d'estate" and "Se chiudi gli occhi", but they weren't successful in the charts. The music video for "Una mattina d'estate" was filmed in the Botanical Garden of Oropa near Biella and premiered in July 2000.

In a 2004 interview the singer spoke unfavourably of the album, describing it as "very poor", to the point that she wanted to withdraw it from the market the day after it was released. She reflected that Rossi "did a good job" but she did not get along well with his team.

== Track listing ==
1. "Una donna da sognare" – 4:21
2. "Se chiudi gli occhi" – 3:59
3. "Sparami al cuore" – 3:26
4. "Una mattina d'estate" – 4:05
5. "Seduttori sedati" – 3:33
6. "Parliamone" – 3:58
7. "Buongiorno a te" – 4:51
8. "Innamorata d'amore" – 3:25
9. "Count Down" – 4:02
10. "Tienimi" – 2:57

== Charts ==
Chart (2000)	Peak position
Italy (FIMI)	6
Italy (Musica e dischi)	14
Europe (European Top 100 Albums)	61
