= Sesso gioia rock 'n' roll =

Studio album by Simone Tomassini
- Released: 2006
- Recorded: Studio San Luca, Bologna
- Genre: Pop rock
- Label: Makno Music
- Producer: Vince Tempera

Sesso Gioia Rock 'n' Roll is the third album by the Italian cantautori Simone Tomassini. It was released in 2006 on the Makno Music label, owned by Enrico Rovelli, the ex-manager of Vasco Rossi and Patti Pravo and founder of the Alcatraz Club in Milan. The album was toured throughout Italy in the summer of 2006, and track 2, "Fuori come un balcone", was chosen for the sound track of Jerry Calà's 2006 film, Vita Smeralda. In addition to twelve original songs written and sung by Tomassini, Sesso Gioia Rock 'n' Roll includes his version of the Guns N' Roses song "Don't Cry" (track 3, "Non piangere mai").

Also performing on the album are Roberto Colombo (synthesizer and bass), Vince Tempera (piano and Hammond organ), Pierluigi Mingotti (bass), and Giancarlo Bianchetti (acoustic guitar). The album is distributed by Delta Dischi.

== Track list ==
1. "Che sorpresa" (lyrics and music by Simone Tomassini) – 3:29
2. "Fuori come un balcone" (lyrics and music by Tomassini) – 3:27
3. "Non piangere mai" (by Izzy Stradlin and Axl Rose, arrangement and Italian lyrics by Tomassini) – 4:31
4. "Scuola della vita" (lyrics by Tomassini and Andrea Ge, music by Tomassini) – 4:47
5. "Testa o croce" (lyrics by Tomassini, music by Riccardo Di Filippo) – 3:41
6. "Di te" (lyrics and music by Tomassini) – 3:33
7. "Vieni vieni bambina" (lyrics and music by Tomassini) – 3:53
8. "Questa notte" (lyrics by Tomassini, music by Roberto Colombo) – 2:49
9. "Burattini e marionette" (lyrics and music by Tomassini) – 3:50
10. "Grido disperato" (lyrics and music by Tomassini) – 3:38
11. "Tra le mani" (lyrics and music by Tomassini) – 3:32
12. "Pura follia" (lyrics and music by Tomassini) – 2:37
13. "Sesso" (lyrics and music by Tomassini) – 3:17

== Production staff ==
- Vince Tempera (artistic producer)
- Maurizio Biancani (mastering)
- Giuseppe Spada (design)
- Pierluigi Mingotti (assistant producer)
- Fausto Demetrio (Pro Tools)
- Gianluca Gadda (mixing)
