= Autostop =

Autostop may refer to:

- Hitchhiking
- "Autostop" (Anna Vissi and The Epikouri song)
- "Autostop" (Patty Pravo song)
