= Agricantus =

Italian band

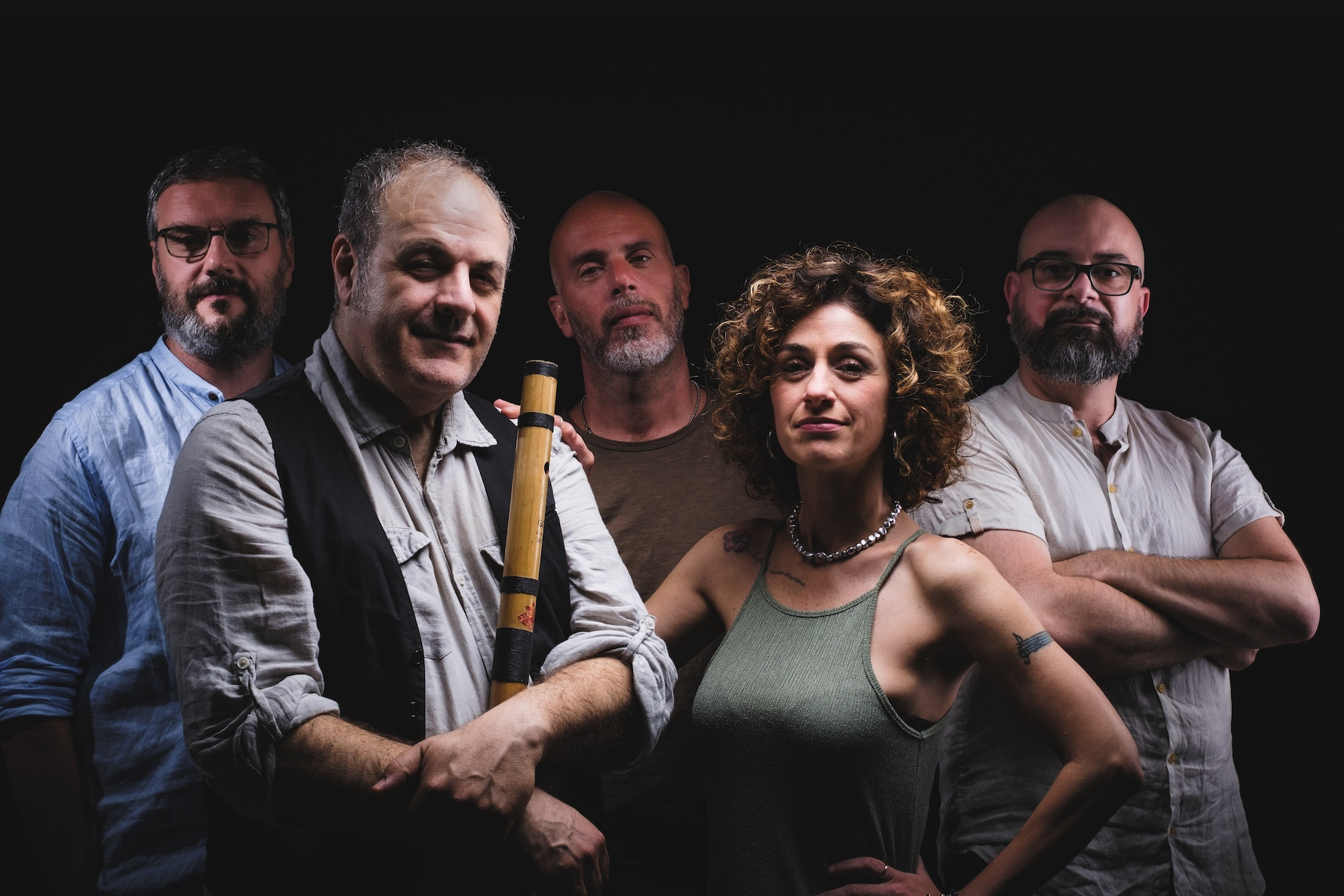

Background information
- Origin: Palermo, Italy
- Genres: Folk, Ambient, World music, Ethnic electronica
- Years active: 1979–present

"Agricantus'' is an Italian musical group formed in Palermo, Sicily, in 1979. Throughout their career, they have developed an artistic path characterized by the blending of musical styles, languages, and dialects, combining instruments from popular musical traditions with electronic sound solutions.

After an initial phase inspired by Andean music and South American folk traditions, the group became part of the Sicilian folk revival in the 1980s. From the 1990s onwards, following their discographic debut and the release of several concept albums, Agricantus shifted their focus towards world music, emphasizing the musical traditions of Southern Italy and the Mediterranean area.

In the 2000s, the group continued their activities through new recordings and collaborations in the fields of cinema and music. From 2008 onwards, distinct artistic paths emerged from the history of Agricantus, each reflecting different aspects of the group’s experience.

== History ==
Agricantus has performed a mixture of musical styles, languages and dialects, modern sounds and archaic musical instruments, through three decades of music. They reached their artistic maturity in the second part of the 1990s, following a particularly prosperous period for world music production in Italy. Their history can then be divided into these main periods.

=== 1979–1994 ===
In their early years, Agricantus were inspired by the reinterpretation of Andean music and South American popular culture, particularly associated with the Nueva Canción movement.

In the early 1980s, the group became involved in the Sicilian folk environment, engaging with artists and cultural figures linked to popular music traditions. This context provided stimulus and inspiration for the continuation of their artistic path, alongside active engagement in the promotion of popular music in Sicily.

In 1984, the group founded a cooperative in Palermo bearing the same name, through which they organized numerous concerts throughout Europe and participated in international folk and world music festivals. Alongside their artistic activity, between 1984 and 1990 the group and the cooperative carried out cultural initiatives in Sicily, including educational projects for schools, support for emerging artistic realities, and solidarity campaigns. Between the second half of the 1980s and the early 1990s, Agricantus developed original projects, including the experience known as AGAVE, which led to independent musical productions.

Agricantus made their discographic debut in 1993 with the album Gnanzù, recorded in Klagenfurt and co-produced by the association Tabbali—responsible for managing the group and its name—and TonStudio Karinthia.The album, dedicated to the musical traditions of Southern Italy, resulted from extensive research into oral tradition materials recorded in the field and reinterpreted through the use of new technologies alongside traditional instruments. Agricantus developed a mature musical language at the beginning of the 1990s with the release of Gnanzù! which was dedicated to the music of Southern Italy, the result of a research of the oral tradition recorded in the field and re-arranged through new technologies using traditional sounds. This new phase also coincided with the joining of the Swiss singer Rosie Wiederkehr who was the lead singer of the group until 2008.

=== 1995–2008 ===
Since 1995, following a signature of a discographic contract with Compagnia Nuove Indye (CNI) and the production directed by Paolo Dossena the band produced more "thematic discs" (concept albums) in which there is the frequent use of mixtures between European and non-European languages side-by-side with the Sicilian language, using too electronic musical instruments and ethnic groups from various parts of the world.

Tuareg (1996) can be considered the most representative album, with which Agricantus have received several national awards. At this stage, the band had also developed more collaborations with the world of cinema and had participated in international music compilations. This allowed Agricantus to be seen as part of the panorama of world music beyond Italian borders, particularly with the USA published collection “The Best of Agricantus”. In 1997 they published “Hale Bopp Souvenir”, named after the Comet Hale-Bopp, an EP that bears witness to the encounter with the Tuareg singer Fadimata Wallet Oumar. In 1998 they published the second concept album Kaleidos, based on the theme of hybridizing their styles with classical music. In 2000 Agricantus signed the soundtrack of the film Placido Rizzotto of Pasquale Scimeca which is published by the eponymous CD. In 2001 they published Ethnosphere third concept album dedicated to the world and the spirituality of Tibetan culture. In 2005 they released the album Habibi. This album marked the interruption of the production with CNI .

The artistic activity then continued with a collaboration with DJ Ravin on the creation of the soundtrack for the TV movie Il figlio della luna (2007) by Gianfranco Albano and Luna khîna published by Rai Trade. By the end of 2008, the collaboration between some of the group’s long-standing members came to an end, marking the conclusion of a phase in the band’s history.

=== Later developments ===
Since 2008, after a hiatus of several years, distinct artistic paths have developed from the Agricantus experience, continuing, in various forms, to draw on the group's history and repertoire. In particular, some of the subsequent musical production, including record releases, concerts, and soundtracks, has been presented and reviewed by the italian press as a continuation of Agricantus's activity (the latter under the musical direction of Mario Crispi), maintaining the use of the group's name in artistic communications and in recording and concert contexts.

Over the following years, new musical productions and collaborations in the film and multimedia fields have been documented, attributable to this artistic continuity, as attested by press articles, reviews, and dedicated cultural programs.

At the same time, an independent artistic project was also developed linked to the figure of Tonj Acquaviva, who, after having produced an album under the aegis of the band, produced record releases and documented concert activities up until 2014, associating his name with the band. In 2024 Tonj Acquaviva passed away.

== Discography ==
=== Agricantus ===
==== Album ====
- 1993 - Gnanzù! - Italy/Austria - AC Tabbàli/TonStudio Karinthya/CNI
- 1996 - Tuareg - Italy - CNI
- 1998 - Kaleidos - Italy - CNI
- 1999 - Faiddi - Italy - CNI
- 2001 - Ethnosphere -- Italy - CNI
- 2005 - Habibi - - Italy - CNI
- 2007 - Luna khina - - Italy - Raitrade

==== EP ====
- 1995 - Viaggiari - |taly - Anagrimba/CNI
- 1997 - Hale-Bopp souvenir - Italy - CNI
- 1998 - Amatevi - Italy - CNI
- 2002 - Jamila (with Francesco Bruno) - Italy/Il Manifesto/CNI

==== Collections ====
- 1999 - The best of Agricantus - USA - Warner
- 2002 - Calura - Italy/Sconfini/CNI

==== Original soundtracks ====
- 2000 - Placido Rizzotto (by P. Scimeca) - Italy - CNI
- 2007 - Il figlio della luna (by G. Albano) Italy - RAITRADE

special guest in Trancendental/Pivio & Aldo De Scalzi scores

- 1997 - Il bagno turco (insieme a Pivio e Aldo De Scalzi)
- 1998 - I giardini dell'Eden (participation with the bonus track Amatevi)

==== Videos ====
- 1996 - Carizzi r'amuri
- 2005 - Habibi

==== prizes ====
- 1996 - Targa Tenco: Tuareg - best dialect album
- 1996 - P.I.M. Premio Italiano della Musica (la Repubblica) – best band of "frontier music"
- 1996 - Premio Augusto Daolio – Tuareg - best album sensitive to social issues

=== Agricantus (reunion project & since 2014) ===
==== Album ====
- 2014 - Turnari - Italy - CNI
- 2018 - Akoustikòs (vol. 1) - Italy - CNI

==== Singles ====
- 2013 - Omini - Italy - CNI
- 2014 – 'Nsunnai - Italy - CNI
- 2013 – Uommene (con Pietra Montecorvino, Federica Zammarchi, Roberta Alloisio, Roberta Albanesi) - Italy - CNI
- 2014 – 'Nsunnai - Italy - CNI
- 2014 – Backstage Turnari - Italy - CNI

==== Video ====
- 2013 – Uommene (con Pietra Montecorvino, Federica Zammarchi, Roberta Alloisio, Roberta Albanesi)
- 2014 – 'Nsunnai
- 2014 – Backstage Turnari

==== Original soundtracks ====
- 2016 - Felicia Impastato (by G. Albano) - Italy - Rai FIction/CNI

=== Agricantus by Tonj Acquaviva ===
==== Album ====
- 2008 - Millennium Klima
- 2013 - Kuntarimari

==== Videos ====
- 2009 – Bukuto
- 2013 – Divinità

==== Prizes ====
- 2011 - Bodini Prize (Culture for Mediterranean)
