= The Wondrous World of Sonny & Chér =

Studio album by Sonny & Cher
- Released: May 1966
- Genre: Pop rock
- Length: 32:11
- Label: Atlantic/Atco
- Producer: Sonny Bono

Sonny & Cher chronology
Baby Don't Go – Sonny & Cher and Friends (1965)	The Wondrous World of Sonny & Chér (1966)	In Case You're in Love (1967)

Singles from The Wondrous World of Sonny & Cher
- 1. "Laugh At Me" Released: August 1965; 2. "But You're Mine" Released: September 1965; 3. "The Revolution Kind" Released: November 1965; 4. "What Now My Love" Released: January 1966; 5. "Have I Stayed Too Long" Released: May 1966

Professional ratings
Review scores
Source	Rating
Allmusic	3.5/5 stars
Record Mirror	3/5 stars

The Wondrous World of Sonny & Chér is the second studio album by American pop duo Sonny & Cher, released in 1966 by Atco Records.

== Album information ==
It was released in 1966 and reached #34 on the Billboard album charts.

The song "But You're Mine" was the first single released from the album, and it peaked at #15 in US and #17 in UK, becoming a big hit. The next single did slightly better, it was a cover of "What Now My Love" and it reached #14 in US and #13 in UK, becoming the only version of that song to reach the top twenty on both sides of the Atlantic.

The album is largely a collection of cover songs including "Summer Time" (originally by George Gershwin) and "Set Me Free" (originally by The Kinks). In 1999 the album was re-released and contained three bonus tracks, "The Revolution Kind", "Have I Stayed Too Long" and "Crying Time".

== Track listing ==
Side A

1. "Summertime" (Ira Gershwin, George Gershwin, Dubose Heyward) – 2:35
2. "Tell Him" (Bert Russell) – 2:34
3. "I'm Leaving It All Up to You" (Don Harris, Dewey Terry) – 2:18
4. "But You're Mine" (Sonny Bono) – 3:02
5. "Bring It On Home to Me" (Sam Cooke) – 3:04
6. "Set Me Free" (Ray Davies) – 2:20

Side B

1. "What Now My Love" (Carl Sigman, Gilbert Bécaud, Pierre Delanoë) – 3:28
2. "Leave Me Be" (Chris White) – 2:03
3. "I Look for You" (Sonny Bono) – 2:40
4. "Laugh at Me" (Sonny Bono) – 2:50
5. "Turn Around" (Harry Belafonte, Alan Greene, Malvina Reynolds) – 2:47
6. "So Fine" (Johnny Otis) – 2:30

== Charts ==
Weekly chart performance for The Wondrous World of Sonny & Chér
Chart (1966)	Peak position
Swedish Albums (Sverigetopplistan)	10
UK Albums (OCC)	15
US Billboard 200	34
US Cash Box Top 100 Albums	29
US Record World Top 100 LP's	14

== Personnel ==
- Cher – vocals
- Sonny Bono – vocals
- Wrecking Crew – instrumental backing

=== Production ===
- Harold Battiste – conductor
- Sonny Bono – arrangements, producer
- Bob Irwin – mastering, mixing
- Stan Ross – engineer

=== Design ===
- Rich Russell – package design
- Jerry Schatzberg – cover photography
- Haig Adishian – original cover artwork
- Jud Cost – liner notes
