= The Blendells =

Mexican-American soul band

- Origin: East Los Angeles, California, United States
- Genres: Brown-eyed soul, Latin rock, instrumental rock
- Years active: 1960s
- Label: Reprise
- Past members: Rudy Valona; Mike Rincon; Ronnie Chipres; Don Cardenas; Tommy Esparza; Sal Murillo

The Blendells were a 1960s Mexican American brown-eyed soul group from East Los Angeles, California. They garnered success in 1964 with their Latin-tinged cover of Little Stevie Wonder's "La La La La La", written by Clarence Paul. During the brief time they were together, they performed at venues such as the Shrine Auditorium. Their tours included performances in California, Arizona, New Mexico, Nevada, Idaho, Oregon and the state of Washington. They shared the stage with The Dave Clark Five, Roy Orbison, Dick Dale, The Ventures, The Shirelles, The Drifters, The Coasters, and Chuck Berry. Though little known today, The Blendells retain a cult following in West Coast Mexican American communities.

== Career ==
Forty years ago, Chicanos from East L.A. broke the mold of stereotypical Mexican-American musicians and singers, and began performing and recording rock & roll in English—an innovation for its time—re-introducing a Califas music style that was almost lost with the earlier demise of the late Ritchie Valens of Pacoima, California.

The Blendells recorded only two singles, "La La La La La", backed with "Huggies Bunnies" and "Dance with Me", backed with "Get Your Baby". "La La La La La" was also included in the Sonny & Cher headlined compilation album Baby Don't Go.

Many in the "West Coast East Side" music community believe the Blendells would have achieved far more success had most of its members not been drafted into the Vietnam War. Rampart Records President (and Vietnam veteran) Steven Chavez stated, "Almost 50% of the artists from the East Side Sound era served in combat roles in Vietnam, losing their innocence to a war in the prime of their youth, and returned to a changed American music scene that pretty much turned their back on them with the advent of new genres like hard rock, heavy metal, punk, disco and the like. Chicano music has had a vast influence on Americana, with some of the most recorded music in the American Music scene never being credited to the Chicano artists that broke the mold from traditional Spanish-language Mariachi and Ranchera music, which is still the stereotypical impression that a lot of people have of Mexican-American artists outside of L.A. & Texas."

More recently, Hector Gonzalez of Rampart Records, along with Emmy Award-winning cinematographer Jimmy Velarde, have produced a documentary movie "The West Coast East Side Sound", which now immortalizes The Blendells and other pioneering Chicano rock & rollers from the West Coast, including Cannibal & the Headhunters, Thee Midniters, The Jaguars, The In Crowd, Sly, Slick, and the Wicked, Thee Counts, Touch, The Viscounts, The Premiers, The Montclairs, and Thee Atlantics. "The West Coast East Side Sound" was screened in 2004 in the new Alan and Elaine Armer Theater on the campus of CSUN (California State University, Northridge).

Blendells guitarist Rudy Valona died on December 26, 2003.

== See also ==
- Chicano rock
