= Tanto (Patty Pravo album) =

Studio album by Patty Pravo
- Released: 1976
- Studio: Nemo Studios, London
- Genre: Pop
- Length: 42:13
- Language: Italian
- Label: RCA Italiana
- Producer: Rodolfo Bianchi

Patty Pravo chronology
Incontro (1975)	Tanto (1976)	Patty Pravo (1976)

Professional ratings
Review scores
Source	Rating
DeBaser	4/5 stars
Europopmusic.eu	4/5 stars

Tanto is the eleventh studio album by Italian singer Patty Pravo, released in 1976 by RCA Italiana.

== Overview ==
The material was arranged by Vangelis, who also played keyboards on the album, and was recorded at his Nemo Studios in London. The album also features Paul Martinez on bass guitar, Morris (Maurice) Pert on piano, and the English Chamber Choir conducted by Guy Protheroe, among others. The title song was released as a single, backed with "Io ti venderei", and performed at the Festivalbar.

Tanto was a top 10 chart success in Italy. It was re-released on CD in 1998, and re-released on gold vinyl for the Record Store Day in 2018.

== Track listing ==
Side A

1. "Tanto" – 3:28
2. "Per te che mi apri l'universo" – 4:07
3. "Io ti venderei" – 4:03
4. "La mia stagione in più" – 4:10
5. "Assurdo" – 5:12

Side B

1. "Le cicale" – 4:27
2. "Per amarti d'amore" – 4:06
3. "E io cammino" – 3:40
4. "Dove andranno i nostri fiori" – 5:19
5. "Eri la mia poesia" – 3:41

== Charts ==
Chart (1976)	Peak position
Italian Albums (Musica e dischi)	9
