= Just You =

1965 single by Sonny & Cher

"Just You" is a song written by Sonny Bono and recorded in January 1965 by US singing duo Sonny and Cher. The single was taken from Sonny and Cher's successful album Look at Us.

== Background ==
Cher wrote in her autobiography that "Just You" remains one of her favorite tracks. "Just You" became the duo's third top twenty hit after "I Got You Babe" and "Baby Don't Go".

== Chart performance ==
The single, released in April 1965, was their first on the ATCO label; previously they were under contract to Reprise Records. Initially the record did not chart, but in the slipstream of the phenomenal success of "I Got You Babe" it was rereleased and in October reached No. 20 on Billboard's Hot 100. The B-side, "Sing C'est la Vie", fared much better in other parts of the world including Belgium, where it reached No. 1, and Australia.

Chart (1965)	Peak position
U.S. Billboard Hot 100	20
