= Briga (singer) =

Italian musician and singer

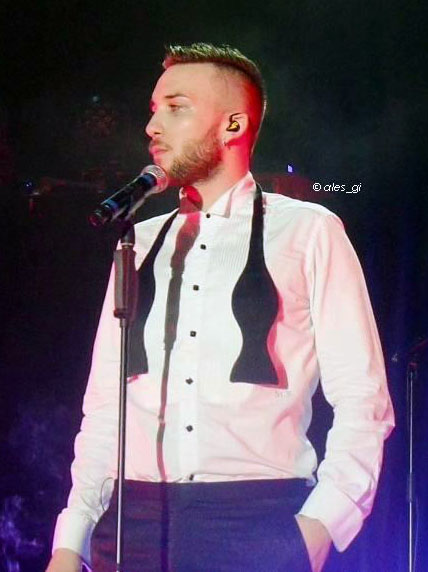
- Briga performing at Never Again Live Tour in Rome (2015)

Background information
- Born: Mattia Bellegrandi; 10 January 1989 (age 37); Rome, Lazio, Italy
- Genres: Pop rap; urban
- Occupations: Rapper; singer; songwriter
- Years active: 2010–present
- Label: Sony Music

Mattia Bellegrandi (born 10 January 1989), known professionally as Briga, is an Italian singer-songwriter and rapper.

Together with Patty Pravo, he participated at the Sanremo Music Festival 2019 with the song "Un po' come la vita".

== Discography ==
=== Studio albums ===
- Alcune sere (2012)
- Never Again (2015)
- Talento (2016)
- Che cosa ci siamo fatti (2018)
- Lunga vita (2021)
- Sentimenti (2025)

=== Compilations ===
- Il rumore dei sogni - Collection (2019)

=== Extended plays ===
- Anamnesi (2010)

== Early years ==
At the age of twelve, Briga's family moved to Paris, although he soon returned to Rome, where he attended high school. After completing his studies, he spent approximately a year traveling through various European countries. In 2006, he moved to Denmark and decided to begin writing hip hop music there. Two years later, in 2008, he relocated to Madrid, where he immediately came into contact with the city's music scene.
