= Look at Us =

1965 studio album by Sonny & Cher

Studio album by Sonny & Cher
- Released: August 2, 1965
- Recorded: May 1965
- Genre: Pop rock
- Length: 35:32
- Label: Atco
- Producer: Sonny Bono

Sonny & Cher chronology
Look at Us (1965)	Baby Don't Go – Sonny & Cher and Friends (1965)

Singles from Look At Us
- 1. "I Got You Babe" Released: July 9, 1965; 2. "Just You" Released: August 1965; 3. "The Letter" Released: October 1965; 4. "Sing C'est La Vie" Released: October 1965

Professional ratings
Review scores
Source	Rating
Allmusic	3/5 stars
Record Mirror	4/5 stars

Look at Us is the debut album by American pop duo Sonny & Cher, released in 1965 by Atco Records. The album reached number two on the Billboard 200 and was certified gold.

== Album information ==
Shortly after their single "I Got You Babe" had reached number 1 on both sides of the Atlantic, Sonny Bono quickly put together an album for himself and Cher to release in late 1965 to capitalize on its success. Much like the single, this album was also a hit, peaking at the number 2 position on the Billboard 200 for 8 weeks. It also went top ten in the UK, reaching #7. The album sold 600,000 copies in three weeks in the US, making it one of the fastest selling LPs in the history of the record business. Other than "I Got You Babe", the album contains the Billboard Hot 100 top 20 hit single "Just You" and the minor hit single "The Letter", which peaked at #75.

The cover was designed by Haig Adishian and photographed by Robert W. Young.

The song "Sing C'est la Vie" was covered in 1968 by future ABBA star Agnetha Fältskog with Swedish lyrics as a non-album duet-single with fellow Swedish singer Jörgen Edman entitled "Sjung denna sång".

== Track listing ==
Side A
No.	Title	Writer(s)	Length
1.	"I Got You Babe"	Sonny Bono	3:11
2.	"Unchained Melody"	Hy Zaret, Alex North	3:52
3.	"Then He Kissed Me"	Phil Spector, Ellie Greenwich, Jeff Barry	2:56
4.	"Sing C'est la Vie"	Sonny Bono, Charles Green, Brian Stone	3:39
5.	"It's Gonna Rain"	Sonny Bono	2:24
6.	"500 Miles"	Hedy West	3:55

Side B
No.	Title	Writer(s)	Length
1.	"Just You"	Sonny Bono	3:36
2.	"The Letter"	Don Harris, Dewey Terry	2:09
3.	"Let It Be Me"	Gilbert Bécaud, Mann Curtis, Pierre Delanoë	2:25
4.	"You Don't Love Me"	Bo Diddley, Willie Cobbs	2:32
5.	"You've Really Got a Hold on Me"	Smokey Robinson	2:24
6.	"Why Don't They Let Us Fall in Love"	Phil Spector, Ellie Greenwich, Jeff Barry	2:29

1998 CD reissue bonus tracks
No.	Title	Writer(s)	Length
13.	"It's the Little Things"	Sonny Bono	3:05
14.	"Don't Talk to Strangers"	Sonny Bono	2:45
15.	"Hello"	Sonny Bono	2:42

== Charts ==
=== Weekly charts ===
Weekly chart performance for Look at Us
Chart (1965)	Peak position
Australian Albums (Kent Music Report)	3
Norway Top 20 LP's	12
Quebec Albums (ADISQ)	1
UK Albums (OCC)	7
US Billboard 200	2
US Cash Box Top 100 Albums	2
US Record World Top 100 LP's	1

=== Year-end charts ===
1965 year-end chart performance for Look at Us
Chart (1965)	Position
US Cash Box	68

1966 year-end chart performance for Look at Us
Chart (1966)	Position
US Cash Box	51

== Certifications and sales ==
Certifications and sales for Look at Us
Region	Certification	Certified units/sales
United States (RIAA)	Gold	750,000
Summaries
Worldwide	—	2,000,000

== Personnel ==
- Cher - co-lead vocals
- Sonny Bono - co-lead vocals
- Hal Blaine, Frank Capp - drums
- Monte Dunn, Barney Kessel, Steve Mann, Howard Roberts, Donald Peake - guitar
- Harold Battiste, Don Randi - piano
- Cliff Hills, Lyle Ritz - bass guitar
- Gene Estes, Brian Stone - percussion
- Michel Rubini - harpsichord

=== Production ===
- Producer: Sonny Bono
- Engineer: Stan Ross
- Arranger: Harold Battiste Jr.
