= Pigramente signora =

Studio album by Patty Pravo
- Released: 1988
- Recorded: 1984–1987
- Genre: Pop
- Language: Italian; English
- Label: CGD
- Producer: Italo Greco; Toto Torquati; Gianni Nocenzi; Cesare De Natale; Bruno Zambrini

Patty Pravo chronology
Occulte persuasioni (1984)	Pigramente signora (1988)	Oltre l'Eden... (1989)

Pigramente signora is a studio album by Italian singer Patty Pravo, released in 1988 by CGD.

== Overview ==
The album consists of covers of vintage songs that Pravo performed in the Italian TV show Premiatissima in 1984 and 1985 or released on singles between 1985 and 1987. The title track is a cover of "To the Morning" by Dan Fogelberg, which Pravo performed at the 37th Sanremo Music Festival.

The album was not a commercial success upon its original release. It charted only in 2022, when Warner Music Italy re-issued it on LP, CD, and on digital formats.

== Track listing ==
Side 1

1. "Pigramente signora (To the Morning)" (Dan Fogelberg, Franca Evangelisti) – 4:36
2. "Il terzo uomo" (Anton Karas) – 3:14
3. "Mille lire al mese" (Alessandro Sopranzi, Carlo Innocenzi, Sonia Pearlswig) – 3:16
4. "La danza di Zorba" (Mikis Theodorakis, Giorgio Calabrese, Giuseppe Gramitto Ricci) – 3:57
5. "Day by Day" (Cesare De Natale, Bruno Zambrini, Franco Migliacci) – 4:32

Side 2

1. "Contatto" (Giuseppe Cancelliere, Franca Evangelisti) – 5:04
2. "Che m'e 'mparato a fà" (Armando Trovajoli, Dino Verde) – 3:24
3. "Il Negro Zumbon" (Franco Giordano, Roman Vatro) – 4:32
4. "Come le rose" (Adolfo Genise, Gaetano Lama) – 3:36
5. "So Fine So Nice" (Giuseppe Cancelliere, Franca Evangelisti, Nicoletta Strambelli) – 4:11

== Charts ==
Chart (2022)	Peak position
Italian Albums (FIMI)	68
Italian Vinyl Albums (FIMI)	11
