= Baby Don't Go – Sonny & Cher and Friends =

Baby Don't Go

Compilation album by Sonny & Cher
- Released: October 1965
- Recorded: 1964–January 1965
- Genre: Pop/Rock
- Length: 27:59
- Label: Reprise

Sonny & Cher chronology
Look at Us (1965)	Baby Don't Go (1965)	The Wondrous World of Sonny & Chér (1966)

Singles from Baby Don't Go
- 1. "Baby Don't Go" Released: August 1965

Professional ratings
Review scores
Source	Rating
Allmusic	3.5/5 stars

Baby Don't Go – Sonny & Cher and Friends is a compilation album released by Reprise Records credited to Sonny & Cher. While signed to Reprise in 1964, the duo recorded and released various unsuccessful singles under the name "Caesar & Cleo", before moving to Atco Records in 1965. After the massive success of their single "I Got You Babe", Reprise combined their old recordings with other numbers by the Righteous Brothers singer Bill Medley, The Lettermen and The Blendells in this compilation album credited to "Sonny & Cher and friends".

Baby Don't Go – Sonny & Cher and Friends was released in 1965 and reached #69 on the U.S. album charts.

The title track "Baby Don't Go" was first released in 1964 and was a minor regional hit. Then following the duo's big success with "I Got You Babe" in the summer of 1965, "Baby Don't Go" was re-released by Reprise and became another huge hit for Sonny & Cher, reaching the top ten in the U.S. and doing well in the UK and elsewhere, going as far as reaching number one in Canada.

== Track listing ==
=== Side A ===
1. "Baby Don't Go" (Sonny Bono) by Sonny & Cher – 3:05
2. "Love Is Strange" (Baker, Smith) by Caesar & Cleo (Sonny & Cher) – 2:45
3. "When" (Law) by The Lettermen - 2:02
4. "I Surrender (To Your Touch)" (Bill Medley) by Bill Medley - 2:10
5. "Walkin' the Quetzal" (S. Bono, Greene, Stone) by Sonny & Cher - 2:10
6. "Leavin' Town" (B. Medley) by Bill Medley - 2:09

=== Side B ===
1. "Do You Want to Dance" (Freeman) by Caesar & Cleo (Sonny & Cher) - 2:33
2. "La la la la La" (Paul) by The Blendells - 2:55
3. "Their Hearts Were Full of Spring" (Troup) by The Lettermen - 1:52
4. "Two Hearts" (Lampert, Turnbull) by The Lettermen - 2:36
5. "Wo Yeah!" (B. Medley) by Bill Medley - 2:12
6. "Let the Good Times Roll" (Goodman, Lee) by Caesar & Cleo (Sonny & Cher) - 1:30

== Charts ==
Weekly chart performance for Baby Don't Go – Sonny & Cher and Friends
Chart (1965)	Peak position
US Billboard 200	69
US Cash Box Top 100 Albums	33
US Record World Top 100 LP's	39
