= Miss Italia (Patty Pravo album) =

Studio album by Patty Pravo
- Released: 1978
- Studio: RCA Studios, Rome; Studio Quattro 1, Rome; Stone Castle Studios, Carimate
- Genre: Pop; pop rock
- Language: Italian
- Label: RCA Italiana

Patty Pravo chronology
Patty Pravo (1976)	Miss Italia (1978)	Munich Album (1979)

Miss Italia is a studio album by Italian singer Patty Pravo, released in 1978 by RCA Italiana. It includes one of her biggest hits, "Pensiero stupendo".

== Overview ==
The album consisted mostly of covers, such as Italian versions of "It's a Heartache" by Bonnie Tyler and "Love → Building on Fire" by Talking Heads. The title track was a cover of Styx's "Miss America", which was excluded from the final track list, but was performed during the accompanying concert tour. Some of the songs were performed in the controversial Italian TV show Stryx broadcast in autumn 1978. The album also includes "Pensiero stupendo", one of Patty Pravo's most well known hits. The ballad "Sentirti" was released as the second single, but did not chart.

Miss Italia was a top 10 chart success in Italy. It was re-released on CD in 1998, and again on LP in 2018.

== Track listing ==
Side A

1. "Johnny" – 3:37
2. "Sentirti" – 4:43
3. "Bello mio" – 4:28
4. "Notti bianche" – 3:57

Side B

1. "Marva" – 5:15
2. "Bello" – 3:31
3. "Dai sali su" – 6:05
4. "Pensiero stupendo" – 4:16

== Charts ==
Chart (1978)	Peak position
Italian Albums (Musica e dischi)	8
