= Pensiero stupendo =

Single by Patty Pravo

from the album Miss Italia
- B-side: "Bello"
- Released: 1978
- Genre: Pop
- Length: 4:14
- Label: RCA
- Songwriters: Ivano Fossati; Oscar Prudente
- Producer: Antonio Coggio

Patty Pravo singles chronology
"Tutto il mondo è casa mia" (1977)	"Pensiero stupendo" (1978)	"Sentirti" (1979)

Audio
- "Pensiero stupendo" on YouTube

"Pensiero stupendo" (Italian for "Wonderful Thought") is a song written by Ivano Fossati (lyrics) and Oscar Prudente (music), and performed by Patty Pravo.

The song's lyrics are a provocative description of a sexual ménage à trois. It was originally chosen to launch the French singer Jeanne Mas in the Italian market, but her version did not convince the RCA director Ennio Melis, who thought the song was more appropriate for Pravo. The track had been previously refused by Loredana Bertè.

The track was the first single from Patty's 1978 album Miss Italia. The B-side of the 7" single was "Bello", a cover of Talking Heads' "Love → Building on Fire". The single turned out a major hit for the singer, peaking at no. 2 in May 1978, kept off the top spot for three consecutive weeks by the Bee Gees' "Stayin' Alive". It was the ninth best-selling single of the year and remains one of the biggest hits of Patty's career.

Pravo re-recorded "Pensiero stupendo" in 1987 and 1990. In 1997, the song was a top 5 hit again, when a new, rockier version was released as a single to promote the concert album Bye Bye Patty.

It is rumoured that pop queen Madonna has recorded a version of the song in 2025 as part of her sessions for her upcoming sequel album to Confessions on a Dance Floor.

== Track listings ==
- 7" single (1978)

A. "Pensiero stupendo" (Ivano Fossati, Oscar Prudente) – 4:14
B. "Bello" (David Byrne, Maurizio Monti) – 3:31

- CD maxi single (1997)
1. "Pensiero stupendo '97" – 5:03
2. "Pensiero stupendo" (V-Mix) – 4:21
3. "Pensiero stupendo" (Vernetti + Gaudi Mix) – 3:53
4. "Pensiero stupendo '97" (Live) – 5:48

== Charts ==
Chart (1978)	Peak position
Italy (Musica e dischi)	2

Chart (1997)	Peak position
Italy (FIMI)	5

== Certifications ==
Region	Certification	Certified units/sales
Italy (FIMI) sales since 2009	Platinum	100,000^{‡}
^{‡} Sales+streaming figures based on certification alone.

== Cover versions ==
- Saxophonist Fausto Papetti released an instrumental cover of the song in 1978.
- Italian band La Crus covered the song on their 2001 album Crocevia with guest appearance from Pravo herself.
- Dolcenera covered the song on her 2005 album Un mondo perfetto.
- Róisín Murphy released a cover on her EP Mi Senti in 2014.
