= Home Free (Dan Fogelberg album) =

Studio album by Dan Fogelberg
- Released: 1972
- Recorded: 1972
- Genre: Folk rock
- Length: 46:57
- Label: Columbia
- Producer: Norbert Putnam

Dan Fogelberg chronology
Home Free (1972)	Souvenirs (1974)

Singles from Home Free
- 1. "To the Morning" Released: 1972; 2. "Anyway I Love You" Released: 1972

Professional ratings
Review scores
Source	Rating
AllMusic	4/5 stars

Home Free is the debut album by American singer-songwriter Dan Fogelberg, released in 1972. Upon its original release, Home Free had lukewarm success, but following a later reissue, it was certified platinum by the RIAA for certified sales of 1,000,000 copies.

== Track listing ==
All tracks are written by Dan Fogelberg.

No.	Title	Length
1.	"To the Morning"	6:34
2.	"Stars"	3:30
3.	"More Than Ever"	5:14
4.	"Be On Your Way"	3:24
5.	"Hickory Grove"	4:40
6.	"Long Way Home (Live in the Country)"	5:31
7.	"Looking for a Lady"	2:58
8.	"Anyway I Love You"	3:50
9.	"Wysteria"	4:03
10.	"The River"	7:13
Total length:		46:57

== Personnel ==
- Dan Fogelberg – vocals, acoustic and electric guitars, acoustic piano, organ, Moog synthesizer
- David Briggs – acoustic piano on "More than Ever" and "Anyway I Love You", organ on "Long Way Home"
- Kenneth A. Buttrey – drums, percussion
- The Goodlettesville String Quartet – strings on "Long Way Home"
- Farrell Morris – percussion, vibraphone
- Weldon Myrick – dobro, pedal steel guitar
- Bill Pursell – string arrangements on "Hickory Grove"
- Norbert Putnam – bass guitar, cello
- Buddy Spicher – fiddle, viola
- Glen Spreen – string arrangements on "To the Morning" and "Wysteria"

Production

- Producer – Norbert Putnam
- Engineers – Gene Eichelberger and Lee Hazen
- Recorded at Quadraphonic Sound Studio (Nashville, TN).
- Photography – Kenneth A. Buttrey
- Cover Portrait – Dan Fogelberg

== Charts ==
Album – Billboard (United States)

Year	Chart	Position
1973	Pop Albums	210
