= To the Morning =

1972 song by Dan Fogelberg

Single by Dan Fogelberg

from the album Home Free
- Released: 1972
- Genre: Folk rock
- Length: 6:11
- Label: Columbia
- Songwriter: Dan Fogelberg
- Producer: Norbert Putnam
- "To the Morning" (audio) on YouTube

"To the Morning" is the debut single by American singer-songwriter Dan Fogelberg, from his 1972 debut album Home Free.

== Background ==
The song was written by Fogelberg with strings arranged by Glenn Spreen. The lyrics are about waking up every day and knowing that it is going to be a new day, regardless of anything else, no matter what happens in life ("It's going to be a day/There is really no way to say no to the morning"). Musically, it is built around piano, with emphasis placed on Fogelberg's vocals while he is singing, and the piano or strings during instrumental sections. The song is peculiar in his canon for featuring no guitar. Though the track length is listed as 6:34 on the CD issue of the album, the length is actually 6:11.

== Patty Pravo version ==
"Pigramente signora"

Single by Patty Pravo

from the album Pigramente signora
- Released: 1987
- Genre: Pop
- Length: 4:45
- Label: Virgin
- Songwriters: Dan Fogelberg; Franca Evangelisti
- Producer: Gianni Nocenzi
- "Pigramente signora" (audio) on YouTube

In 1987, Italian singer Patty Pravo recorded a cover version of the song titled "Pigramente signora" with Italian lyrics by Franca Evangelisti. The track was produced by Gianni Nocenzi. It was released as a single-sided 7-inch single and achieved a top 20 chart placing in Italy. Pravo performed it at the 37th Sanremo Music Festival, but it was not successful, finishing in 20th place and sparking accusations of plagiarism. The song was included on the 1988 album Pigramente signora.

=== Charts ===
==== Weekly charts ====
Chart (1987)	Peak position
Italy (Musica e dischi)	18
Italy Airplay (Music & Media)	5
