= But You're Mine =

- Swedish picture sleeve

Single by Sonny & Cher

from the album The Wondrous World of Sonny & Chér
- B-side: "Hello"
- Released: Late 1965
- Genre: Pop
- Length: 3:00
- Label: Atco
- Songwriter: Sonny Bono

Sonny & Cher singles chronology
"The Revolution Kind" (1965)	"But You're Mine" (1965)	"What Now My Love" (1966)

"But You're Mine" is a 1965 pop song written by Sonny Bono and recorded by the duet Sonny & Cher. The lyrics tell about a hippie couple who do not fit into the society, but who are still happy because they have each other. The song reached the top 20 in the US and the United Kingdom.

== Composition and recording ==
In mid-August 1965, while returning to America from a two-week promotional tour of Britain, Bono noticed Cher repeatedly singing the Fortunes' "You've Got Your Troubles" to herself. He composed "But You're Mine" and quickly committed a demo recording of the song to tape. Convinced it would be a hit, he presented the tape to Jerry Wexler of Atlantic Records, who was instead unimpressed.

The American folk rock band the Lovin' Spoonful performed as studio musicians on the final recording. Atco Records issued it a single in late 1965.

Billboard described the song as an "exciting rhythm ballad with offbeat message lyric."

== Charts ==
Chart (1965)	Peak position
Canadian RPM Top Singles	8
Canadian Quebec Singles (ADISQ)	12
UK Singles (OCC)	17
US Billboard Hot 100	15
US Cash Box Top 100	23

== Cover versions ==
- Benny Quick and Petra Prinz released a German cover "Wir gehen unsern Weg allein" in 1965.
- In 1966, Frank Alamo released a French cover "Ça ne fait rien car je t'aime" which reached no. 36 in the francophone part of Belgium.
- The song was covered by Patty Pravo as "Ragazzo triste" ("Sad Boy") with Italian text written by Gianni Boncompagni. It was released as her first single in 1966 and reached no. 13 in the Italian charts the following year. The song later appeared on Pravo's debut self-titled LP.
