= Pazza idea =

Single by Patty Pravo

from the album Pazza idea
- B-side: "Morire tra le viole"
- Released: 1973
- Genre: Pop
- Length: 4:45
- Label: RCA Italiana
- Songwriters: Paolo Dossena; Cesare Gigli; Maurizio Monti; Giovanni Ullu

Patty Pravo singles chronology
"Io" (1972)	"Pazza idea" (1973)	"Come un Pierrot" (1974)
- "Pazza idea" (audio) on YouTube

"Pazza idea" (Italian for 'Crazy Idea') is an Italian ballad composed by Maurizio Monti and Giovanni Ullu, with lyrics written by Paolo Dossena and Cesare Gigli. It was originally performed by Italian singer Patty Pravo and released as a single from the album of the same name in 1973.

The song reached no. 1 in the Italian singles chart and stayed at the top for nine consecutive weeks between August and October 1973. It also charted in Belgium and the Netherlands, thus becoming Patty's second international hit. "Pazza idea" was the second best-selling single of 1973 in Italy and remains one of the biggest hits of Patty Pravo's career. The music video for the song was filmed in Forte dei Marmi and London.

The singer has recorded the track in Spanish as "Una locura", in English as "Crazy Idea", and in German as "Was für ein Tag". She also revisited the Italian version twice on her albums of re-recordings in 1987 and 1990.

== Track listing ==
- 7" single

A. "Pazza idea" (Paolo Dossena, Cesare Gigli, Maurizio Monti, Giovanni Ullu) – 4:45
B. "Morire tra le viole" (Maurizio Monti) – 3:44

- 7" single (Spain)

A. "Una locura" – 4:40
B. "Nosotros" – 3:45

- 7" single (Germany)

A. "Was für ein Tag" – 3:46
B. "Die schwarze Rose" – 2:58

== Charts ==
=== Weekly charts ===
Chart (1973–74)	Peak position
Italy (Musica e dischi)	1
Belgium (Ultratop Wallonia)	46
Netherlands (Single Top 100)	17
Netherlands (Dutch Top 40)	26

=== Year-end charts ===
Chart (1973)	Peak position
Italy	2

== Cover versions ==
- Laurent Rossi released a French-language cover "Quelle idée folle" as the B-side on his 1974 single "Notre histoire".
- Dutch singer Rita Hovink covered the song as "Laat me alleen" on her 1976 album Een rondje van Rita. It reached no. 26 in the Netherlands the following year. That version was re-released as a duet with Gerard Joling for his 2008 album Bloedheet, this time reaching no. 1.
- Daisy Door released a German-language cover "Komm' in mein Haus" in 1977.
- Iva Zanicchi covered the song on her 1987 album Care colleghe.
- In 1997, Dutch group Mama's Jasje released a cover "Laat me alleen" on their album Hommages. It reached no. 3 in the Dutch-speaking part of Belgium.
- In 2012, Albano Carrisi released a cover of the Spanish version of the song, "Una locura", on his album Canta Italia.
