= Mai una signora =

Studio album by Patty Pravo
- Released: 1974
- Genre: Pop
- Label: RCA Italiana

Patty Pravo chronology
Pazza idea (1973)	Mai una signora (1974)	Incontro (1975)

Mai una signora (Italian for Never a Lady) is a studio album by Italian singer Patty Pravo, released in 1974 by RCA Italiana.

All songs were composed by Giovanni Ullu, and texts written by Maurizio Monti. The album was a huge commercial success, topping the Italian sales chart for three consecutive weeks. It included the top 10 hit "Come un Pierrot".

== Track listing ==
Side A

1. "Quale signora" – 5:27
2. "La valigia blu" – 3:14
3. "Autobus" – 3:29
4. "Un amore assoluto" – 5:23

Side B

1. "Come un Pierrot" – 4:32
2. "Carezze tutti i giorni" – 3:11
3. "La prigioniera" – 4:57
4. "Quasi magia" – 3:31

== Charts ==
Chart (1974)	Peak position
Italian Albums (Musica e dischi)	1
