= Sì... incoerenza =

Studio album by Patty Pravo
- Released: 7 June 1972
- Recorded: 1972
- Studio: Fonorama Studios, Milan
- Genre: Pop
- Language: Italian; English
- Label: Philips
- Producer: Patty Pravo

Patty Pravo chronology
Per aver visto un uomo piangere e soffrire Dio si trasformò in musica e poesia (1971)	Sì... incoerenza (1972)	Pazza idea (1973)

Sì... incoerenza is the seventh studio album by Italian singer Patty Pravo, released in 1972 by Philips Records.

== Overview ==
For this album, Patti Pravo collaborated with singer and composer Léo Ferré, with whom she records Italian cover versions of famous songs: "Piccino" (the original "Petite") and "Col tempo" ("Avec le temps"). Ferré himself performs two instrumental compositions on the album called "La solitudine", opening and closing the record.

Among others, the album contains songs such as "Per me amico mio", an Italian-language cover of Sonny & Cher's popular duet song "A Cowboy's Work Is Never Done", "Non so perché mi sto innamorando", an Italian version of "The Way of Love" (also performed by Cher), and "A modo mio" (Italian version of the song "My Way" from the repertoire of Frank Sinatra). The song "Valsinha" was recorded in the same year by singer Mia Martini and included in her album Nel mondo, una cosa (1972).

One single was released from the album, "Io", backed with "Un po' di più", which did not receive much chart success. The album itself reached the twelfth place in the weekly chart. This album was the singer's last collaboration with Philips Records.

== Track listing ==
Side A

1. "La solitudine (La solitude)" (Léo Ferré) – 0:55
2. "A modo mio (My Way)" (Andrea Lo Vecchio, Alberto Testa, Jacques Revaux, Claude François, Gilles Thibaut) – 4:24
3. "Lover Man" (Jimmy Davis, Ram Ramirez, Jimmy Sherman) – 5:21
4. "Valsinha" (Sergio Bardotti, Vinícius de Moraes, Chico Buarque) – 1:24
5. "Non so perché mi sto innamorando (The Way of Love)" (Alberto Testa, Al Stillman, Jacques Dieval) – 2:16
6. "Col tempo (Avec le temps)" (Enrico Medail, Léo Ferré) – 4:40

Side B

1. "Solo un uomo" (Mario Cenci, Luigi Capello) – 4:08
2. "Per me amico mio (A Cowboy's Work Is Never Done)" (Luigi Albertelli, Sonny Bono) – 3:10
3. "Io" (Giancarlo Bigazzi, Claudio Cavallaro) – 3:53
4. "Un po' di più" (Shel Shapiro, Sergio Bardotti) – 3:35
5. "Piccino (Petite)" (Enrico Medail, Léo Ferré) – 4:09
6. "La solitudine (La solitude)" (Léo Ferré) – 0:59

== Personnel ==
- Patty Pravo – vocals, production
- Bill Conti – arrangement, conductor
- Gianni Ronco – artwork
- Luciano Tallarini – artwork
- Gaetano Ria – sound engineering
- Paolo Gianbarberis – photography
- Roberto Bertolini – photography

Credits are adapted from the album's liner notes.

== Charts ==
Chart performance for Sì... incoerenza
Chart (1972)	Peak position
Italian Albums (Musica e dischi)	12
