= Autostop (Patty Pravo song) =

Single by Patty Pravo

from the album Munich Album
- B-side: "New York"
- Released: 1979
- Genre: Pop
- Length: 4:00
- Label: RCA Italiana
- Songwriters: Paul Jeffery; Maurizio Monti; Nicoletta Strambelli
- Producers: Michael Holm; Rainer Pietsch

Patty Pravo singles chronology
"Sentirti" (1979)	"Autostop" (1979)	"Per una bambola" (1984)
- "Autostop" (audio) on YouTube

"Autostop" is a 1979 Italian-language song performed by Patty Pravo, written by her then-husband Paul Jeffery, Maurizio Monti, and Pravo herself under her birth name Nicoletta Strambelli. It was released as the only single from Pravo's 1979 LP Munich Album, with English-language songs "New York" and "Cry, Cry, Gotta Worry" as the B-sides in Italy and Germany, respectively. The single was a moderate chart success in Italy.

== Track listing ==
- 7" single

A. "Autostop" (Paul Jeffery, Maurizio Monti, Nicoletta Strambelli) – 4:00
B. "New York" (Franco Migliacci, Flavio Paulin) – 4:14

- 7" single (Germany)

A. "Autostop" – 4:00
B. "Cry, Cry, Gotta Worry" – 3:48

== Charts ==
Chart (1979)	Peak position
Italy (Musica e dischi)	23
