= Benny Quick =

- Born: Rolf Müller; 31 December 1943; Essen, Germany
- Died: 22 December 1999 (aged 55) Frankfurt am Main, Germany
- Genres: Pop; Schlager
- Occupation: Singer

Rolf Müller (Essen, 31 December 1943 – Frankfurt am Main, 22 December 1999) known as Benny Quick, was a German pop and Schlager singer of the 1960s and 1970s.
