= Philip Alongi =

American news producer and opera singer

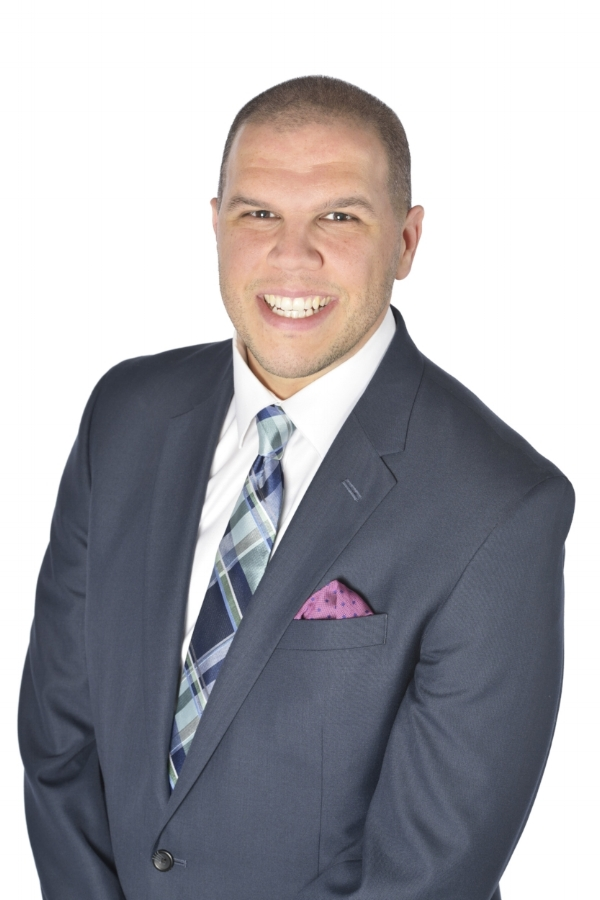
- Education: Mason Gross School of the Arts of Rutgers University
- Occupations: Television producer Opera singer President and CEO of Alongi Media
- Television: Executive producer of NJTV News
- Awards: 2 Emmy Awards and 21 Emmy nominations

Philip Alongi is an American television producer and opera singer. He is a two-time Emmy Award winner and has received eighteen Emmy Award nominations. As a singer, he has performed in several dozen operas for US opera companies. He is the former executive producer of Live PD: Wanted and current President and CEO of Alongi Media.

== Early life ==
Alongi graduated from the Mason Gross School of the Arts at Rutgers University. He was originally a rock singer in a band called Philip's Head, before taking up opera, which he studied at Rutgers. He is the son of television producer Phil Alongi, Sr.

== Television ==
In 1997 Alongi joined NBC News, where he produced for Nightly News, The Today Show, and NBC News at Sunrise. In 2011 he later became the executive producer of NJTV News. In 2016 he was also named to the forty under forty list of NJBIZ. In 2017 Alongi became the director of program development at NJTV. In 2017 Alongi also served as the executive producer to I Can't... I Have Rehearsal, a documentary about high school musical theatre programs that was broadcast on NJTV. That year he was elected to the Board of Governors for the New York Chapter of the National Academy of Television Arts and Sciences. Alongi received two Awards and eighteen twenty one nominations for New York regional Emmy Awards himself for his producer work at NJTV as well as Mid-Atlantic Chapter Emmy Awards.

Later in 2019, Alongi departed from NJTV News and launched Live PD: Wanted on A&E, where he served as Showrunner and Executive Producer throughout the series’ entire run. In 2020, he co-founded Alongi Media with his father Phil Alongi Sr and assumed the role of Chief Executive Officer in 2024.

He is the Executive Producer of Guttermuckers, a feature film starring Jim Belushi, Leslie Jones, Bobby Lee, Lil Rel Howery, Brick Patrick, and John Budge.

== Opera ==
Alongi is an operatic tenor and sings opera with professional companies in the US. Roles he has played include Luigi in Il Tabarro, Radames in Aida, Don Jose in Carmen, Cavaradossi in Tosca, Alfredo in La Traviata, and Canio in Pagliacci. In addition to performing in a few dozen operas, he has twice performed opera on The Today Show, and sang at the funeral mass of Tim Russert as well as at Russert’s memorial service at the Kennedy Center for the Performing Arts in Washington, D.C. Alongi also performed at both the 2008 and 2012 Republican National Conventions, as well as the 2008 Democratic Presidential Primary Debate at Florida Atlantic University. As of 2025, he serves as the President of the Board of OperaWorks.
