= Gepy & Gepy =

Italian singer, songwriter, producer and arranger

- Born: Giampiero Scalamogna; 13 June 1943; Rome, Italy
- Died: 3 July 2010 (aged 67); Rome, Italy
- Occupation: singer-songwriter

Giampiero Scalamogna (13 June 1943 – 3 July 2010), best known as Gepy & Gepy, was an Italian singer, songwriter, producer and arranger. As a songwriter he also worked under the alias Sergepy. For his powerful voice and robust physique he was often compared to Barry White and Demis Roussos.

== Background ==
Born in Rome, Scalamogna started singing when he was sixteen years old. In 1965 Scalamogna met singer, Daniela Casa, at the Piper Club in Rome. He launched his professional singing career when he founded the duo Dany & Gepy with Daniela Casa. Later Scalamogna started his solo career as Gepy & Gepy. He often performed with singer and actress, Melissa Chimenti.

In the 1970s Scalamogna produced Ornella Vanoni with whom he had a successful duet song, "Più". At the end of the 1970s he focused on the disco dance genre, composing and performing songs such as "Body to Body" (opening theme of the RAI TV-show Discoring) and "Blu". Both songs were minor hits in the European charts. His song "African Love Song" was part of the Nicky Siano's playlist at the Studio 54.

In the early 1970s, Scalamonga with Antonello Venditti, Sergio Bardottie and Franco Latini wrote the infamous football anthem, “Roma (non si discute, si ama)” for the football club, AS Roma.

Scalamonga died at 67 from a severe form of pneumonia.
