= La bambola =

1968 single by Patty Pravo

Single by Patty Pravo

from the album Patty Pravo
- B-side: "Se c'è l'amore"
- Released: 1968
- Genre: Pop
- Length: 3:08
- Label: RCA Victor
- Songwriters: Franco Migliacci; Bruno Zambrini; Ruggero Cini

Patty Pravo singles chronology
"Se perdo te" (1967)	"La bambola" (1968)	"Gli occhi dell'amore" (1968)
- "La bambola" (audio) on YouTube

"La bambola" (Italian for 'The Doll') is an Italian pop song written by Franco Migliacci, Bruno Zambrini and Ruggero Cini, and performed by Patty Pravo. The song had been previously refused by several artists, including Gianni Morandi, Little Tony, Gigliola Cinquetti, Caterina Caselli and the Rokes.

The single peaked at number one on the Italian chart for nine consecutive weeks between May and June 1968 and was certified gold. It had sold 200,000 copies by May 1968 and a million copies by December 1968. The single also charted in Argentina. It is considered as the song which consecrated Patty Pravo to fame. The B-side of the single is "Se c'è l'amore" ("If There Is Love"), a cover of Long John Baldry's "Let the Heartaches Begin". A Spanish-language version of the song was released in Spain.

Pravo revisited "La bambola" on her albums of re-recorded material in 1987 and 1990. To commemorate the fortieth anniversary of the hit, she released a new version of the song in 2008.

"La bambola" was covered by numerous artists. It was also used in several films, notably Anton Corbijn's The American, Michele Placido's Romanzo Criminale, Emanuele Crialese's Respiro, and Bigas Luna's Bambola.

== Track listings ==
- 7" single

A. "La bambola" (Franco Migliacci, Bruno Zambrini, Ruggero Cini) – 3:08
B. "Se c'è l'amore" (Franco Migliacci, Tony Macaulay, John Macleod) – 3:02

- 7" single (Spain)

A. "La bambola" (Franco Migliacci, Bruno Zambrini, Ruggero Cini, Cholo Baltasar) – 3:08
B. "Lettera a Gianni (Carta a Gianni)" (Sergio Bardotti, Shel Shapiro) – 2:08

== Charts ==
=== Weekly charts ===
Chart (1968)	Peak position
Italy (Musica e dischi)	1
Belgium (Ultratop Wallonia)	37
Germany (Media Control	35
Netherlands (Dutch Top 40)	10
Netherlands (Single Top 100)	11

== Madonna version ==
"La bambola"

Promotional single by Madonna
- Released: 7 January 2026
- Length: 2:51
- Label: Warner Records
- Songwriters: Franco Migliacci; Bruno Zambrini; Ruggero Cini
- Producer: Stuart Price

Music video
- "La bambola" on YouTube

=== Background ===
American singer-songwriter Madonna has collaborated numerous times with Dolce & Gabbana on tour costumes, fashion shoots, and eyewear. In 2025, Dolce & Gabbana showcased an entire fashion collection inspired by Madonna for the Milan Fashion Week Spring Summer 2025 season. Dolce and Gabbana first saw Madonna during her Blond Ambition World Tour and later went on to provide costumes for The Girlie Show Tour in 1993. During a conversation with Vogue magazine, Madonna stated that the fragrance felt like a "natural extension of our personal and professional relationship."

Madonna covered the song for Dolce & Gabbana's "The One" campaign, and released it as a single on 7 January 2026.

=== Composition ===
Madonna's rendition is described as smoky by comparison to Pravo's.. During her interview with Vogue Italia magazine, Madonna said "I remember listening to it when I was young, and I thought about it again when Mert Alas told me he wanted a soundtrack for the Dolce & Gabbana campaign. In the studio, Stuart Price and I created several versions, there's even a dance version."

=== Usage in media ===
The advert was shot by Mert Alas and references both Patty Pravo and features actor Alberto Guerra. Madonna wanted to show the beauty and complexity of Italian women, stating that this confidence originates from "their confidence, independence and effortless style." The synopsis involves The new campaign unfolds as a night transformed into a stage of emotions, wrapped in a mysterious atmosphere and interwoven with echoes of 1970s Italian neorealist cinema and Luchino Visconti. At the center of the scene stands Madonna: a strong, confident, determined woman. She breaks conventions and boldly rewrites the rules of seduction with charisma and audacity. Every gesture is magnetic; every whispered word becomes a promise that ignites the imagination. Between jealousy and passion, the tension culminates in a passionate kiss, sealing the union of the two protagonists.

=== Live performance ===
In March 2026, Madonna performed the song in an intimate dinner setting following Dolce & Gabbana's Women Fashion show, to which Madonna was also an attendee. The performance was uploaded a couple days later, showcasing Madonna in a Like a Virgin-inspired white bridal veil, culotte and corset, along with an orchestra.

=== Charts ===
Weekly chart performance for "La bambola"
Chart (2026)	Peak position
UK Singles Downloads (Official Charts)	24
US World Digital Song Sales (Billboard)	2

== Other cover versions ==
- Dalida recorded a version of the song which charted at no. 6 in Austria and no. 48 in the French-speaking region of Belgium.
- Heidi Brühl released a cover of the song in 1968.
- Anita Lindblom released a cover of the song in 1968.
- Fredi recorded the song in Finnish as "Pieni nukke" in 1968.
- Anneke Grönloh covered the song in Italian 1968 and in English ("The Love Alarm") in 1969.
- Aino Bāliņa-Karmo cover version "Lelle" ("The Doll" in Latvian) in 1970.
- Ivan Cattaneo covered the song in 1983 on the album Bandiera gialla.
- Band Olé Olé recorded a cover of the song on their 1987 album Los caballeros las prefieren rubias.
- Anny Schilder released a cover in 1989.
- Giusy Ferreri released a cover in 2008.
- Sara Lov covered the song on the album I Already Love in 2011.
- Aylin Prandi covered the song on her album 24,000 Baci in 2011.
- Sergio Dalma included a cover of the song on his 2011 album Via Dalma II.
- Tamara Miansarova released a cover "Кукла (rus "The Doll")" from LP "Тамара Миансарова" ("Self-Titled") in 1970.

== See also ==
- List of best-selling singles in Italy
