= ...E dimmi che non vuoi morire =

Single by Patty Pravo

from the album Bye Bye Patty
- Language: Italian
- Released: February 1997
- Genre: Pop
- Length: 4:15
- Label: Pensiero Stupendo; EMI
- Songwriters: Vasco Rossi; Roberto Ferri; Gaetano Curreri
- Producer: Celso Valli

Patty Pravo singles chronology
| "I giorni dell'armonia" (1995) | "...E dimmi che non vuoi morire" (1997) | "Pensiero stupendo '97" (1997) |
- "...E dimmi che non vuoi morire" (audio) on YouTube

"...E dimmi che non vuoi morire" (Italian for "...And Tell Me You Don't Want to Die") is a 1997 song performed by Italian singer Patty Pravo. It was composed by Roberto Ferri and Gaetano Curreri, with lyrics written by Vasco Rossi.

Pravo performed the track at the 47th Sanremo Music Festival in February 1997 where it took 8th place and won the critics' award. It was released as a single with a live version of "Qui e là" and included on the concert album Bye Bye Patty issued the same month. "...E dimmi che non vuoi morire" changed the fortunes of Patty's long-declining career and was her first top 5 chart hit in Italy in almost 20 years. The CD single has sold in over 300,000 copies.

== Track listing ==
- CD single
1. "...E dimmi che non vuoi morire" – 4:15
2. "Qui e là" – 3:24

== Charts ==
=== Weekly charts ===
| Chart (1997) | Peak position |
|---|---|
| Italy (FIMI) | 2 |
| Italy (Musica e dischi) | 12 |

=== Year-end charts ===
| Chart (1997) | Peak position |
|---|---|
| Italy | 86 |

== Cover versions ==
- Benny Neyman covered the song in Dutch as "De waarheid zoek ik in je ogen" on his album Je dromen achterna in 1997.
- Gigi Sabani covered the song on his 1998 album Misto fritto.
