= Simone Tomassini =

Italian cantautori (born 1974)

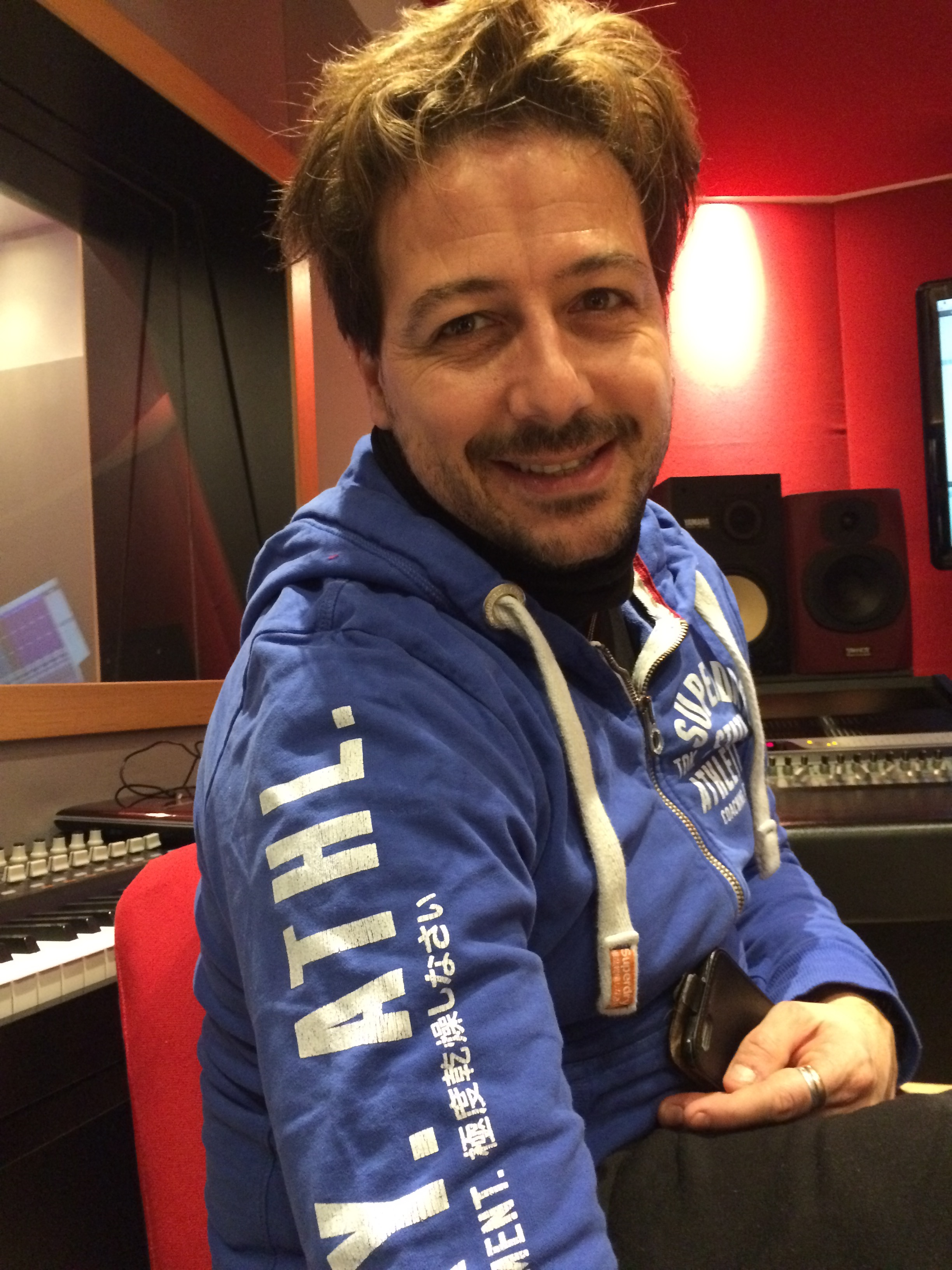

Background information
- Also known as: Simone
- Born: 11 May 1974 (age 52); Vertemate con Minoprio, Como, Italy
- Genres: Rock
- Occupation: Singer-songwriter
- Instrument: Vocals
- Years active: 2004–present
- Website: simonetomassini.com

Simone Tomassini (born 11 May 1974), who often performs simply as Simone, is an Italian Singer-songwriter who has toured widely in Italy and appeared at the Sanremo Music Festival.

== Biography ==
Simone Tomassini was born in Vertemate con Minoprio, in the Province of Como. He studied music privately and then at the Accademia di Musica Moderna in Milan. His first big break came at the 2004 Sanremo Music Festival with his song "È stato tanto tempo fa" which became a radio success and was recorded by EMI both as a single and on his album Giorni, which he toured in Italy. That year he also appeared on Festivalbar performing his single "Il mondo che non c'è". His first album was produced by the impresario Enrico Rovelli, the ex-manager of Vasco Rossi and Patty Pravo and founder of the Alcatraz Club in Milan. Rovelli had taken Tomassini under his wing after a chance meeting in Milan when Rovelli's car almost knocked Tomassini over as he was crossing the street. Later in 2004, Tomassini was the opening act on Vasco Rossi's Buoni o cattivi tour.

In 2005 Tomassini appeared on the RAI music reality show, Music Farm presented by Simona Ventura, where he placed third in the singing competition. His second album, Buon viaggio, came out in May of that year and was also toured throughout Italy. In October, he again opened the performances of Vasco Rossi's 2005 Buoni o cattivi tour. The year concluded with a live performance at the Alcatraz Club in Milan (issued on DVD in 2006). In 2006, he released his third album, Sesso gioia rock 'n' roll, and his song "Fuori come un balcone" was chosen for the sound track of Jerry Calà's film, Vita Smeralda. 2007 saw the release of his hit single "Niente da perdere" and a return appearance with Vasco Rossi.

A longtime fan of the Calcio Como football team, Tomassini inaugurated their new anthem, "Quando sei comasco", during the team's September 2008 tribute to Stefano Borgonovo at the Sinigaglia Stadium. In 2009 he appeared as a guest star at the Boario Summer Festival and at an open-air solo concert in Como's main piazza. At the end of 2009, he visited the United States, where he performed in several venues in New York City, including Pianos and Webster Hall. A new album, with the American label Gallery Records Inc. and mastered at the Sterling Sound studios in New York, is planned for release worldwide 11 May 2011, while the single "Caduta Libera", with a video recorded over the Como Lake, was aired on the radio on 29 April 2011. Tomassini started the new 2011 world tour called "Sempre in Tour" (always on tour) with a "Data Zero", on 29 April 2011, at the Cagno Palasport.

== Discography ==
Singles

- "É stato tanto tempo fa", 2004. Label: EMI Italia
- "Niente da perdere", 2007. Label: Universal Music Italia
- "Ho scritto una canzone", 2010. Label: Gallery Records Inc.
- "Caduta libera", 2011. Label: Gallery Records Inc.

Albums

- Giorni, 2004. Label: EMI Italia
- Buon viaggio, 2005. Label: EMI Italia
- Sesso gioia rock 'n' roll, 2006. Label: Makno Music
- "Simone Tomassini", 11 May 2011. Label: Gallery Records, Inc.

DVDs

- Simone Live: '05 Alcatraz Milano, 2006. Label: Makno Music

== Sources ==
- Borghetti, Fabio, "Simone, Vertemate riabbraccia il figlio famoso che torna e canta per gli amici", La Provincia, 23 June 2008 (in Italian, accessed 22 April 2010)
- Borghetti, Fabio, "Simone, il popolo dei fans risponde all'appello", La Provincia, 25 January 2009 (in Italian, accessed 22 April 2010)
- Borghetti, Fabio, "Simone: «Aspetto il verdetto su Sanremo Ma non so restare lontano dal palco»", La Provincia, 1 January 2010 (in Italian, accessed 22 April 2010)
- Brescia Oggi, "Sesso, gioia e rock'n'roll, È la proposta di Simone", 21 August 2009 (in Italian, accessed 22 April 2010)
- Fegiz, Mario Luzzatto, Simone: «Un incidente ha cambiato la mia vita», Corriere della Sera, March 2004 (in Italian, accessed 22 April 2010)
- Festivalbar, Artisti: Simone", 2004 (in Italian, accessed 22 April 2010)
- Il Quotidiano, "Simone Tomassini in concerto a Ripatransone" 28 July 2006 (in Italian, accessed 22 April 2010)
- ANSA, "Como: Il Borgo torna al Sinigaglia", 21 September 2008 (reprinted on the official website of the Fondazione Stefano Borgonovo) (in Italian, accessed 22 April 2010)
- La Provincia, "Simone, concerto tutto rock ed energia: da ricordare", 19 July 2009 (in Italian, accessed 22 April 2010)
- La Repubblica, Festival Sanremo 2004 (in Italian, accessed 22 April 2010)
- Libero, "La Dolce Vita Smeralda", 13 July 2006 (in Italian, accessed 22 April 2010)
- Moroni, Anna "Non ho niente da perdere", Sorrisi e Canzoni TV, 4 July 2007 (in Italian, accessed 22 April 2010)
- RAI, Music Farm: Cantanti, 2005 (in Italian, accessed 22 April 2010)
