= Celentano =

Celentano (pronounced [tʃelenˈtaːno]) is a surname of Italian origin, originally indicating someone from Cilento. People with that name include:

- Adriano Celentano (born 1938), Italian singer and actor
  - Adriano Celentano discography
- Ana Celentano (born 1969), Argentine actress
- Bernardo Celentano (1835–1863), Italian painter
- Daniel Celentano (1902–1980), American artist
- David Celentano (born 1951), American epidemiologist
- Francis Celentano (1928–2016), American painter
- Jeff Celentano (born 1960), American actor and director
- Matilde Celentano (born 1959), Italian medic and politicia
- Roman Celentano (born 2000), American footballer
- Rosalinda Celentano (born 1968), Italian actress

== Other uses ==
- Clan Celentano, Italian record label founded by Adriano Celentano
- Mina Celentano, 1998 album by Mina and Adriano Celentano
- Pizza Celentano, Ukrainian pizza restaurant chain
- 6697 Celentano, minor planet

== See also ==
- Cilentano
