= Fabio Concato =

Italian singer-songwriter (born 1953)

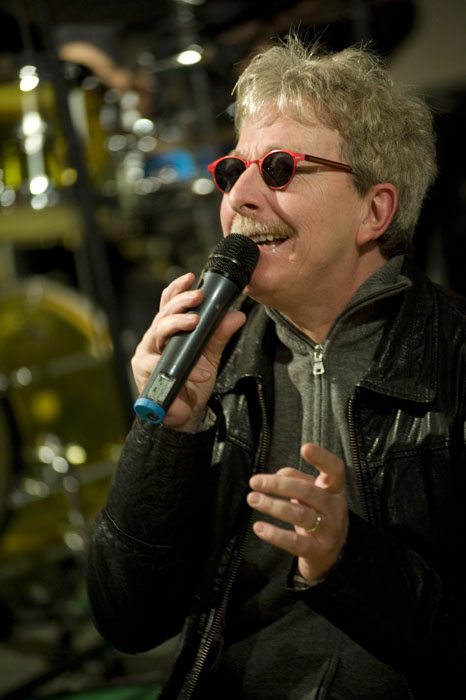
- Concato in 2010

Background information
- Born: Fabio Piccaluga; 31 May 1953 (age 73); Milan, Italy
- Occupations: Singer; songwriter
- Years active: 1977–present

Fabio Piccaluga (born 31 May 1953), known professionally as Fabio Concato, is an Italian singer-songwriter.

== Life and career ==
Born Fabio Piccaluga in Milan, the son of a jazz musician and a poet, Concato started his career with the cabaret group "I mormoranti", performing at the Derby Club in his hometown. He debuted as a singer-songwriter with the album Storie di sempre, which included a minor hit in the form of A Dean Martin. Concato's popularity received a big boost in 1982 with the song "Domenica bestiale", which became a major hit in the Italian charts. Other popular songs by Concato include "Fiore di maggio", "Speriamo che piova", "Ti ricordo ancora" and "051/222525". Concato entered the Sanremo Music Festival twice, in 2001 with "Ciao ninìn" and in 2007 with "Oltre il giardino".

== Discography ==
Album

- 1977: Storie di sempre (Harmony, LPH 8017)
- 1978: Svendita totale (Harmony, LPH 8030)
- 1979: Zio Tom (Philips, 6223 088)
- 1982: Fabio Concato (Philips, 6492 131)
- 1984: Fabio Concato (Philips, 822 079-1)
- 1986: Senza avvisare (Philips, 830 037-1)
- 1990: Giannutri (Philips, 842 945-1)
- 1992: In viaggio (Mercury Records, 512 901-1)
- 1996: Blu (Mercury Records, 532 923-2)
- 1999: Fabio Concato (Mercury Records, 538 857-2)
- 2001: Ballando con Chet Baker (Mercury Records, 548 628-2)
- 2012: Tutto qua (Halidon, HALP08)
