= Paolo Dossena =

Italian composer

Paulo Dossena
- Born: 29 January 1942 (age 84); Parma, Italy
- Occupation: Record producer

Paulo Dossena (born 29 January 1942) is an Italian record producer, lyricist, arranger and composer.

== Life and career ==
Born in Parma, Dossena moved to Rome in the early 1960s and started collaborating with RCA Records, soon specializing in producing French artists such as Charles Aznavour, Dalida, Sylvie Vartan and Alain Barrière, often also translating the original lyrics of their songs for their Italian cover versions.

In the early 1970s Dossena founded the label Delta, and produced artists such as Riccardo Cocciante, Antonello Venditti, Francesco De Gregori and Patty Pravo, occasionally also serving as arranger and songwriter. After collaborating with the record company CAM, in 1990 he founded a new label, Compagnia Nuove Indye, also known as CNI Music, which launched groups such as Almamegretta and Agricantus.

Dossena is also active as a film score composer, and his credits include films by Mario Monicelli and Ferzan Özpetek.
