= Alex Baroni =

Italian singer (1966–2002)

Background information
- Born: Alessandro Guido Baroni; 22 December 1966; Milan, Italy
- Died: 13 April 2002 (aged 35) Rome, Italy
- Genres: Pop; R&B; neo soul
- Occupations: Singer; songwriter
- Instrument: Vocals
- Years active: 1994–2002
- Labels: DDD, Ricordi
- Website: www.alexbaroni.it (in Italian)

Alessandro Guido "Alex" Baroni (22 December 1966 – 13 April 2002) was an Italian singer and songwriter, active between 1994 and 2002. He released four albums during his lifetime. A fifth record, a tribute album, and two more collections (one of which double, both of them containing previously unreleased material, and his greatest songs) came out after his death in 2002.

== Early life and career ==
He was born to Carlo, a physicist, and Marina, a mathematician. His parents passed on their passion for science to both him and his younger brother Guido (also born on 22 December, but in 1968). In fact, Alex graduated in chemistry at the University of Milan and at the beginning of his career as a musician he worked for several years as a chemistry teacher in public and private technical institutes, while Guido graduated in mechanical engineering and obtained a chair at the Department of Electronics, Information and Bioengineering of the Polytechnic University of Milan.

From a very young age, Alex showed an innate passion for music; he began to cultivate this passion at the age of 17, after a motorbike accident – for which he also risked paralysis – forced him to bed for an entire year. At the end of the long hospital stay, in which he found in singing a fundamental distraction from the forced immobility, he took lessons from Luca Jurman, formed a group with some friends and started to perform in various clubs in Milan, proposing covers of funk, soul and blues songs composed by both American and Italian artists, first of all Pino Daniele.

== Personal life ==
Between 1997 and 2001, Baroni was in a relationship with fellow singer Giorgia.

== Death ==
In early 2002, after colliding with a car while driving his motorcycle in a Rome beltway, Baroni was hospitalized; he died several weeks later, on 13 April 2002.

== Discography ==
- Fuorimetrica (1994 – DDD)
- Alex Baroni (1997 – Ricordi)
- Disney's Hercules – Italian Original Soundtrack (1997 – Wonderland Music Company)
- Quello che voglio (1998 – Ricordi)
- Onde – International Album (1998 – Ricordi; compilation album for export only, including tracks taken from the albums Alex Baroni and Quello che voglio).
- Ultimamente (1999)
- Semplicemente – Dual Disc: CD/DVD (CD 2002 – CD/DVD 2006 – Ricordi)
- C'è di più (2004 – Ricordi)
- Alex (Tributo ad Alex Baroni) (2006 – Azzurra Music)
- Alex Baroni Collection (2007 – Ricordi / Sony Music / BMG)
