= Patty Pravo =

Italian singer (born 1948)

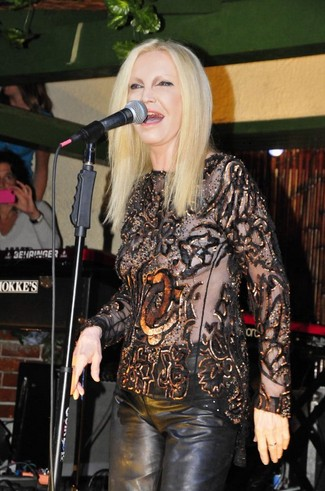
- Patty Pravo in concert, 2014

Background information
- Born: Nicoletta Strambelli; 9 April 1948 (age 78); Venice, Italy
- Genres: Pop; pop rock; beat; chanson
- Occupation: Singer
- Years active: 1966–present
- Labels: RCA; Philips; Dischi Ricordi; CGD; Fonit Cetra; Sony Music; Edel; Carosello; Warner Music Italia

Nicoletta Strambelli (born 9 April 1948), known professionally as Patty Pravo, is an Italian singer. She debuted in 1966 and remained most successful commercially for the rest of the 1960s and throughout the 1970s. Having suffered a decline in popularity in the following decade, she experienced a career revival in mid-late 1990s and reinstated her position on Italian music charts. Her most popular songs include "La bambola" (1968), "Pazza idea" (1973), "Pensiero stupendo" (1978), and "...E dimmi che non vuoi morire" (1997). Pravo has sold over 110 million records worldwide, becoming one of the best-selling Italian music artists. She scored fourteen top 10 albums (including three number ones) and twelve top 10 singles (including two number ones) in her native Italy. Pravo participated at the Sanremo Music Festival eleven times, most recently in 2026, and has won three critics' awards. She also performed twelve times at the Festivalbar.

== Background and early life ==
Strambelli was born to parents Aldo Strambelli and Bruna Caporin, and was raised in a liberal fashion at her paternal grandparents' place. She spent her formative years in Venice where she was acquainted with American poet Ezra Pound and the future Pope John XXIII. She started taking piano, dance and solfège classes from a young age, and entered the Benedetto Marcello Music Conservatory straight into the fourth grade when she was ten.

== Career ==
=== 1960s and 1970s ===
In 1962, deeply affected by the passing of her grandfather, she left Venice and moved to London to learn English. At the age of seventeen, she moved to Rome where she began her career dancing and singing at the newly opened Piper Club, which earned her the nickname "la ragazza del Piper" ("The Piper Girl"). There is a number of versions as to the origins of her stage name, but most likely, "Patty" came from names of English girls that the singer was dining with on one occasion, and "Pravo" was inspired by the expression "anime prave" ("wicked souls") from Dante Alghieri's Divine Comedy.

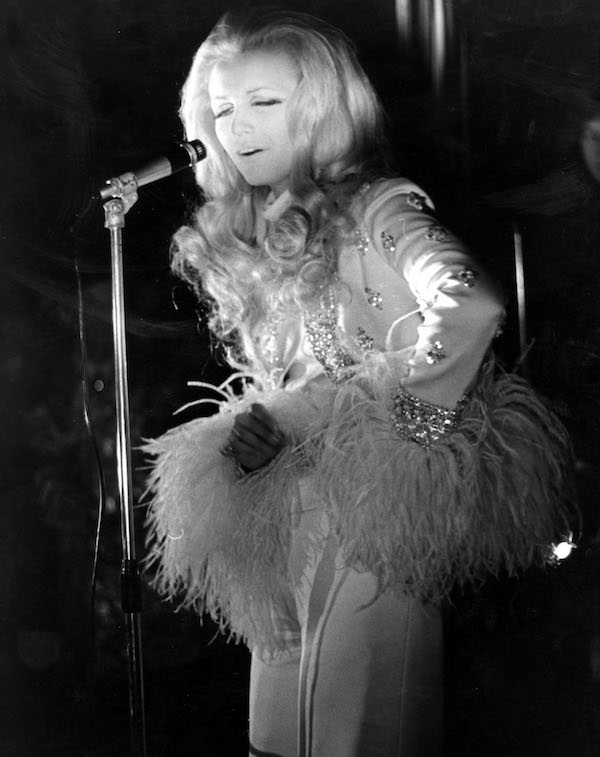
Pravo in concert at the Piper Club in Rome, 1969

Having secured a contract with RCA Italiana, Patty released her first single in late 1966, "Ragazzo triste" (English: "Sad Boy"), the Italian version of "But You're Mine" by Sonny & Cher. Although some of the lyrics caused objections from the national radio network RAI, it would be the first pop song broadcast on Vatican Radio, and reached the top 20 in the sales chart. Pravo scored another top 20 single in 1967, "Se perdo te" ("If I Lose You"), written by English songwriter Paul Korda and originally performed by P. P. Arnold as "The Time Has Come". She made brief appearances in various Italian films, including Camillo Mastrocinque's The Most Beautiful Couple in the World and two pictures by Mariano Laurenti, usually performing the popular song "Qui e là" ("Here and There").

In 1968, she released what would become one of her signature songs, "La bambola" ("The Doll"). It was a number 1 hit in Italy for nine consecutive weeks, and also charted internationally in Europe and South America. The single sold a million copies within months and was later awarded a gold disc. It was followed by a chart-topping self-titled debut album and a no. 2 hit "Sentimento" ("Feeling"). Pravo went on to release two more top 10 hits: "Tripoli 1969" and "Il paradiso" ("Paradise"), the latter performed at Festivalbar. Both were included on her second album, Concerto per Patty (Concert for Patty), which peaked at no. 5. In autumn 1969, she released another top 20 single, "Nel giardino dell'amore" ("In the Garden of Love"), which she performed to some success in the variety show Canzonissima.

Pravo took part in the Sanremo Music Festival 1970 with the song "La spada nel cuore" ("A Sword in the Heart") performed in duet with Little Tony. The song placed fifth in the contest and was a chart success. She then released another album called just Patty Pravo which marked a change of musical direction from beat music towards a more melodic repertoire. The LP reached the top 10 of the Italian chart and included the hit "Per te" ("For You"), and a duet with Robert Charlebois "La solitudine" ("Loneliness"). Pravo found success in France, where she was dubbed "Italian Édith Piaf" for her interpretation of "Non, je ne regrette rien". She followed it with a music special Bravo Pravo broadcast on French TV on New Year's Eve 1971. It would also be the title of her new LP. Although it was her lowest-charting album at that point, it spawned the popular Italian version of Jacques Brel's "Ne me quitte pas", titled "Non andare via", and another top 5 hit "Tutt'al più".

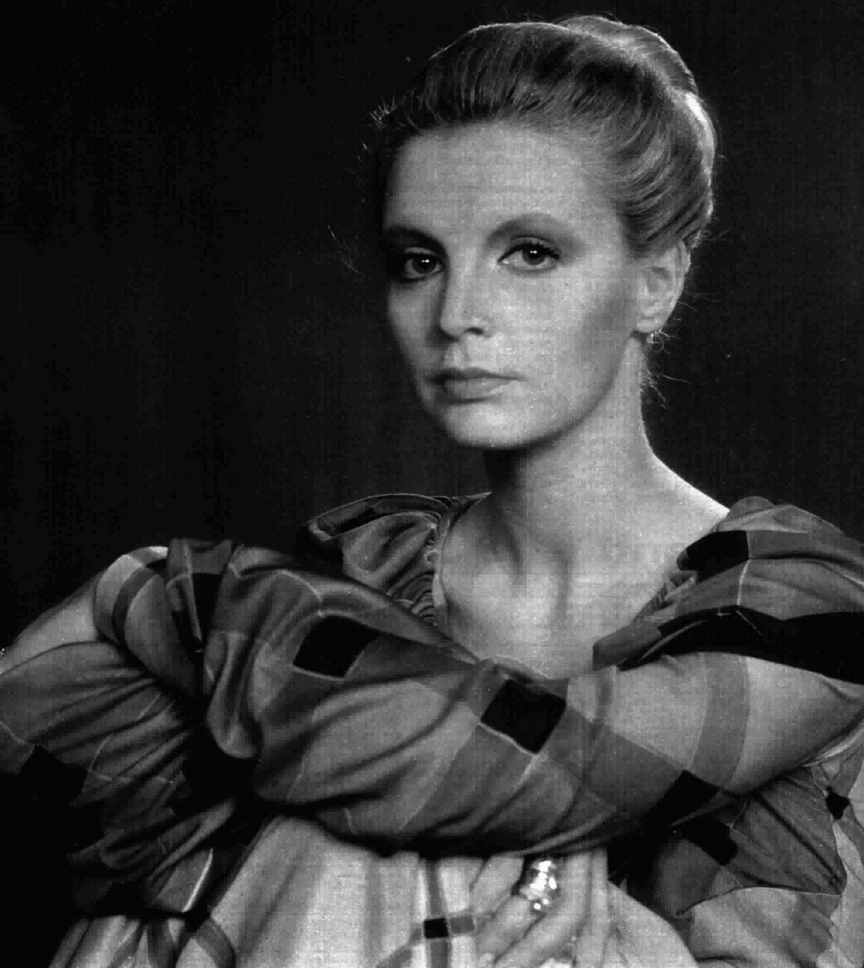
Pravo in 1972

After her contract with RCA had expired, Pravo signed with Philips Records and recorded a trilogy of albums, released in quick succession between 1971 and 1972. They consisted of more sophisticated and complex material. The first one was Di vero in fondo, accompanied by a single with an Italian version of "(Where Do I Begin?) Love Story". Both the album and the single reached the top 10 in Italy. The following two LPs, Per aver visto un uomo piangere e soffrire Dio si trasformò in musica e poesia (To See a Man Cry and Suffer, God Turned Himself into Music and Poetry) and Sì... incoerenza (Yes... Inconsistency), did not fare as well, but still placed within the top 20. In the meantime, Pravo released a standalone single, "Non ti bastavo più" ("I Wasn't Enough to You Anymore"), which reached no. 6.

In 1973, the singer reunited with her former label RCA and released what would become one of the biggest hits of her career, the ballad "Pazza idea" ("Crazy Idea"). It spent two months atop the Italian singles chart, staying consecutively in the top 5 for over four months, eventually selling in over 1,5 million copies. The song's parent album, also titled Pazza idea, was a number 1 on the Italian sales chart six weeks in a row. Pravo collaborated with the same team of songwriters on her next LP, Mai una signora (Never a Lady), released in 1974. It was another chart-topper, and spawned the popular single "Come un Pierrot" ("Like a Pierrot") and the Festivalbar song "Quale signora" ("Which Lady"). In 1975, she released Incontro (The Meeting), an album reportedly recorded in only three days. It was a commercial success and reached no. 4 in the sales chart. The title song was performed at the Festivalbar and reached no. 6 in Italy.

In spring 1976, Pravo released Tanto (So Much), a collaboration with Vangelis, who arranged the songs and played keyboards on the album. It was a top 10 chart success in Italy, and the title song was performed at the Festivalbar outside competition. Later in 1976, she released yet another self-titled record, this time for Dischi Ricordi. The album was highly experimental in nature, introducing rock and funk into Pravo's music, and its heavy use of synthesizers was uncommon at that time. It underperformed commercially, although the single "Grand hotel" was moderately successful in the charts.

At the end of 1977, Pravo signed with RCA for the third time, and the following year released the single "Pensiero stupendo" ("Wonderful Thought"). It became one of her biggest hits, reaching no. 2 in the Italian chart and staying in the top 5 for nine consecutive weeks. The song was later included in the album Miss Italia which peaked at no. 8 in Italy. Some of the songs from this LP were performed in the controversial Italian TV show Stryx, in which Pravo appeared alongside such singers as Amanda Lear and Grace Jones. In 1979, she recorded a new album in Munich with German producers Rainer Pietsch and Michael Holm, hence the title Munich Album. Musically, it was a blend of electronic and rock music, influenced by punk, which was also reflected in Pravo's new image. The LP did not match the success of the predecessor, but spawned the moderate hit "Autostop".

=== 1980s and 1990s ===
Following the hostility of the Italian press, and her disappointment in Italian music scene, Pravo moved to the United States in the early 80s. She posed nude for the September 1980 issue of the Italian edition of Playboy, and for the December 1981 issue of Playmen. While in America, Pravo recorded a new wave-influenced LP, Cerchi (Circles), released in June 1982 by CBO Records. Originally intended to be an entirely English-language record, it eventually featured songs performed in Italian, English and French. It was only a moderate success, peaking at No. 24.

Her 1984 single "Per una bambola" ("For a Doll") won the critics' award at the Sanremo Festival and was a top 20 chart success. However, the song's parent album, Occulte persuasioni (Hidden Persuasions), released by CGD, failed to make an impact on the sales chart, despite favourable reviews. She recorded a series of covers of vintage songs which were broadcast in the popular TV show Premiatissima. In 1985, she had a moderate chart success with the song "Menù" which she also performed at the Festivalbar.

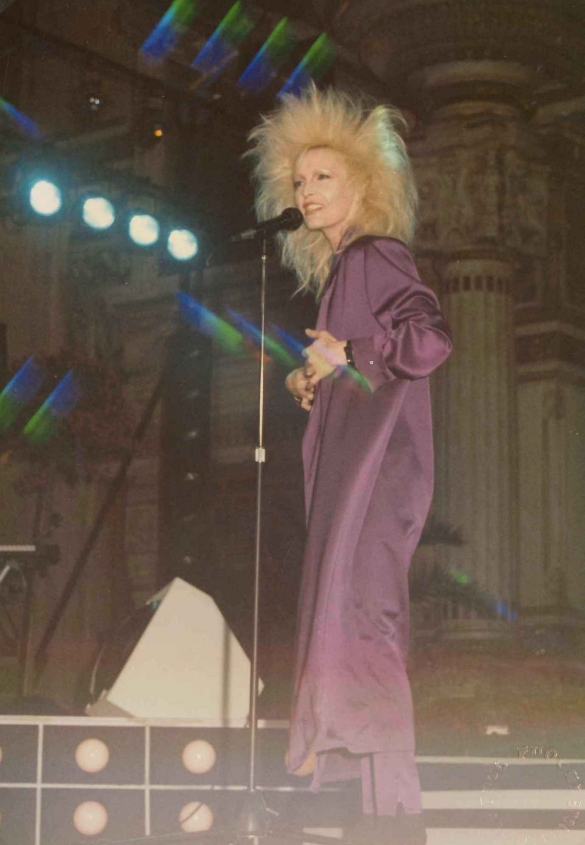
Pravo in concert, 1987

In 1987, Patty entered the Sanremo Festival contest again. Her song "Pigramente signora" ("Lazily a Lady") was a cover of Dan Fogelberg's "To the Morning", yet the singer was accused of plagiarism. The song did not fare well in the contest, although it reached No. 18 on the Italian singles sales chart. The controversy led to the cancellation of her new contract with Virgin Records. Pravo released an album titled Pazza idea with new versions of her old material, and in 1988, the LP Pigramente signora, a collection of songs she had recorded in the past few years, including the recent single "Contatto". Neither of them was successful in the charts.

Her next album, Oltre l'Eden... (Beyond Eden...), was produced by Paolo Dossena and released by Fonit Cetra in 1989. Although it was not a chart success, it met with positive critical reception and is often regarded as one of Pravo's best works. The title track took part in the Festivalbar song contest. In 1990, Pravo was due to perform the song "Donna con te" ("Woman with You") at Sanremo, but shortly before the event, she raised reservations towards the lyrics and asked for major changes. Her request was rejected and she eventually refused to perform. The song was then given to Anna Oxa to perform in the contest to much success. In the same year, Pravo released another album of re-recordings of her classic hits, Pazza idea eccetera eccetera... for the label Five, but it was not a commercial success.

In 1992, Pravo was arrested for possessing hashish, having had a history of cocaine possession. She was put in the female prison in Rebibbia, Rome, but was released after only three days. The following year, the singer went to China where she spent nine months travelling around the country. She would make history as the first Italian artist to perform in China. Chinese music and culture provided inspiration for her next album, Ideogrammi, recorded in Beijing with local musicians. It was released in October 1994 by a minor Italian label Zard Records, and distributed by Sony Music. No single was released to promote the album, and it was not a commercial success, but it received positive reviews. In 1995, Pravo returned to the Sanremo Festival with the song "I giorni dell'armonia" ("Days of Harmony"), but it was met with lukewarm reception.

Pravo celebrated the 30th anniversary of her musical debut in 1996 and embarked on a greatest hits tour. In 1997, the singer once again participated in the Sanremo Festival. This time it was a triumph and the ballad "...E dimmi che non vuoi morire" ("...And Tell Me You Don't Want to Die") won the Mia Martini critics' award in addition to placing 8th in the voting contest. It then entered the Italian sales chart at no. 2, turning out not only Patty's biggest hit in nearly 20 years, but also one of her most popular songs ever. The success of the song sparked a renewed interest in her music. She released her first live album Bye Bye Patty via her own label Pensiero Stupendo, and it charted in the top 5. A new version of "Pensiero stupendo" was then released as a single and was also a top 5 hit.

On her next studio album, Notti, guai e libertà (Nights, Trouble and Freedom), Pravo worked with some renowned Italian songwriters, including Ivano Fossati, Franco Battiato and Lucio Dalla. The album was released in spring 1998 to critical acclaim and reached the top 5 in Italy. The songs "Les Etrangers" ("Strangers") and "Strada per un'altra città" ("Road to Another City") were performed at the Festivalbar. Pravo toured extensively in support of the album in 1998 and 1999.

=== 2000s and 2010s ===
Patty's next album, Una donna da sognare, was primarily produced by Vasco Rossi and released in May 2000. Although it generated mixed reviews, it peaked at no. 6, thus becoming one of her highest-charting albums ever. The title song was a hit single, reaching no. 11 in Italy, and was performed at the Festivalbar together with the second single, "Una mattina d'estate" ("Summer Morning"). In 2001, Epic Records released a double live album Patty Live 99 against the singer's wishes, yet it was a moderate chart success. In May, Patty performed at the benefit concert Pavarotti & Friends.

In February 2002, Pravo released the single "L'immenso", which she performed at the Sanremo Festival, only finishing in 16th place. It was a moderate chart success in Italy, similarly to the follow-up, "Noi di là (Lagoinha)". Both songs were promoting her new album Radio Station, which received positive reviews and was a top 10 success. The singer then embarked on another long concert tour. RCA released a two-disc compilation 100% Patty, featuring mostly her 60s and 70s material, which was a minor chart success. In 2004, Pravo released her next album, Nic-Unic (abbreviation of "Nicoletta Unica"). It was a collaboration with young, largely unknown songwriters and presented an innovative, avant-garde sound, with most songs co-written by Pravo herself. The album received favourable reviews and reached no. 14 in the sales chart. The single "Che uomo sei" ("What Kind of Man Are You") peaked at no. 13.

Sony released a new compilation Canzoni stupende in 2005, which was a top 40 seller on the chart. During a concert in Syracuse, Sicily in October 2006, Patty fell from the stage and sustained a lip injury. She was unable to continue to perform, and the remaining dates were cancelled. In September 2007, she released the album Spero che ti piaccia... Pour toi (I Hope You Like It... For You) through a small label Kyrone Music. It was a homage to Dalida, with a selection of her songs performed in French, Italian and Arabic. The album received very little promotion, with no single or tour to support it, and only achieved minor success in the charts. Around the same time, Pravo published an autobiography Bla, bla, bla... through Arnoldo Mondadori Editore. A self-titled CD+DVD compilation released by Sony was a minor chart success.

To commemorate the fortieth anniversary of her hit "La bambola", the singer released a new version of the song in July 2008. She embarked on another tour, which resulted in a double live album Live Arena di Verona – Sold Out, recorded at Verona Arena. It was released in February 2009 by independent label Edel and charted in the top 20 in Italy. The album featured a brand new song, "E io verrò un giorno là" ("And I'll Be There One Day"), which reached no. 24 in the singles chart and was presented at the Sanremo Festival, yet without much success. Pravo returned to Sanremo only two years later, in 2011, performing "Il vento e le rose" ("The Wind and the Roses"). Again, she lacked success and the song was eliminated two days into the contest, although was moderately successful in the charts. It promoted her next studio album, Nella terra dei pinguini (In the Land of Penguins), released in February 2011 by Carosello Records. It met with mostly positive reviews and entered the sales chart in Italy at no. 15.

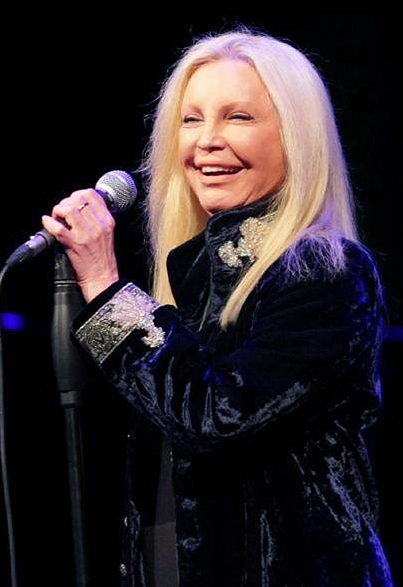
Pravo in concert at Teatro Petruzzelli, 2013

In early 2012, Patty released the single "Com'è bello far l'amore" ("How Nice It Is to Make Love") from Fausto Brizzi's film of the same name, and the song went on to win the "Italian Golden Globe". In the same year, she had a top 40 success with the single "La luna", which would be included on the multi-disc anthology Meravigliosamente Patty. It was released in spring 2013 and reached no. 30 in the sales chart. Later that year, she released the single "Non mi interessa" with Ermal Meta, which was a minor success. She made a cameo appearance as herself in the 2014 Greek film Xenia, directed by Panos H. Koutras, which tells about two brothers who are obsessed with her music.

In February 2016, Pravo performed the song "Cieli immensi" ("Immense Skies") at the Sanremo Festival, placing 6th and winning her third critics' award. The single was very successful commercially, reaching the top 20 in Italy. Its parent album Eccomi (Here I Am) was released by Warner Music Italy to coincide with Sanremo and peaked at no. 6. Musically, it veered towards more commercial pop and included collaborations with such artists as Emis Killa, Fred De Palma and Baustelle. Pravo published her second autobiography, La cambio io la vita che..., in late 2017. In April 2018, Rai 3 broadcast a TV special In arte Patty Pravo commemorating her 70th birthday. In June, she was the coach in the Rai 1 talent show Ora o mai più, and in December, released another double live album, Live La Fenice (Venezia) – Teatro Romano (Verona), which was a minor success in the charts.

In 2019, Pravo participated in the Sanremo Festival contest for the tenth time, this time in duet with Italian singer Briga, performing the song "Un po' come la vita" ("A Little Bit like Life"). The track was not successful, placing only at the 21st position and reaching no. 61 in the singles chart. Pravo released her new studio album, Red, simultaneously with the festival through the independent label Dischi dei Sognatori. It received mixed reviews and reached no. 17 in Italy.

=== 2020s ===
In early 2020, Pravo appeared as a judge on Il cantante mascherato, the Italian edition of the TV show Masked Singer. December 2020 saw the release of a photographic biography Minaccia Bionda, and in February 2021, Rai 1 broadcast a TV special of the same name. From 2022 to 2023, Pravo performed with the Minaccia Bionda Tour.

Pravo worked with producer Taketo Gohara on a new album, which was scheduled for release in early 2024. In 2025, she released the single "Ho provato tutto" ("I Tried Everything") and embarked on a summer tour of the same name, as well as the follow-up single "Ratatan". On 30 November 2025, she was announced among the participants of the Sanremo Music Festival 2026. She competed with the song "Opera", which placed 24th. Her next studio album, also titled Opera, was released through Warner Music in March 2026 and entered the Italian chart at number 19.

== Personal life ==
Pravo has been married six times, and all relationships ended in divorce, yet on good terms. Her first husband was English drummer Gordon Faggetter, whom she married in Brighton in 1968 and stayed with for four years.

In February 1972 in Rome, she married Italian designer Franco Baldieri. They separated after a few weeks, but did not dissolve their union. In 1974, she married Riccardo Fogli in a Celtic rite in Gretna Green, Scotland. This marriage, however, would not be recognized in Italy where Pravo was still married to Baldieri and Fogli to Viola Valentino.

In the mid-1970s, Pravo lived in a love triangle with English guitarist Paul Jeffery and bassist Paul Martinez. In 1976 in Bali, she entered a marriage with Jeffery which would last five years. In 1978, she married Martinez in California, thus committing bigamy.

In August 1982, she married American guitarist John Edward Johnson in San Francisco, which resulted in trigamy, as she was still officially married to Martinez as well as Baldieri.

Pravo is adamant about not having children.

She claims that she has never voted. Having previously identified as an anarchist, she currently holds anti-state views.

== Discography ==
=== Studio albums ===
List of studio albums with peak chart positions (Note: Federazione Industria Musicale Italiana established the official Italian albums and singles charts only in the mid-1990s. Positions before 1995 are from the charts compiled by Musica e dischi.)
Year	Title	ITA	EUR	Sales
1968	Patty Pravo	1	—	
1969	Concerto per Patty	5	—	
1970	Patty Pravo	7	—	
1971	Bravo Pravo	12	—	
1971	Di vero in fondo	7	—	
1971	Per aver visto un uomo piangere e soffrire Dio si trasformò in musica e poesia	17	—	
1972	Sì... incoerenza	12	—	
1973	Pazza idea	1	—	
1974	Mai una signora	1	—	
1975	Incontro	4	—	
1976	Tanto	9	—	
1976	Patty Pravo	—	—	
1978	Miss Italia	8	—	
1979	Munich Album	22	—	
1982	Cerchi	24	—	
1984	Occulte persuasioni	—	—	
1987	Pazza idea (re-recordings of old material)	—	—	
1988	Pigramente signora	68 (Note: Pigramente signora did not chart upon its original release. Chart position is for the 2022 re-issue.)	—	
1989	Oltre l'Eden...	—	—	
1990	Pazza idea eccetera eccetera... (re-recordings of old material)	—	—	
1994	Ideogrammi	—	—	
1998	Notti, guai e libertà	5	53	ITA: 150,000
2000	Una donna da sognare	6	61	
2002	Radio Station	9	93	
2004	Nic-Unic	14	—	
2007	Spero che ti piaccia... Pour toi	46	—	
2011	Nella terra dei pinguini	15	—	
2016	Eccomi	6	—	
2019	Red	17	—	
2026	Opera	19	—	

=== Live albums ===
List of live albums with peak chart positions
Year	Title	ITA	EUR	Sales
1997	Bye Bye Patty	3	32	ITA: 250,000
2001	Patty Live 99	26	—	
2009	Live Arena di Verona – Sold Out	14	—	
2018	Live La Fenice (Venezia) – Teatro Romano (Verona)	60	—	

=== Compilation albums ===
List of compilation albums with peak chart positions
Year	Title	ITA	EUR
1971	Tutti i successi di Patty Pravo	—	—
1976	La magia di Patty Pravo	—	—
1977	I successi di Patty Pravo	—	—
1977	Le più belle canzoni di Patty Pravo	—	—
1977	Portrait	—	—
1979	Momenti stupendi	—	—
1980	Emozioni	—	—
1982	Hit Parade International	—	—
1984	Questione di cuore	—	—
1985	L'album di Patty Pravo (3 LP box)	—	—
1987	Sentimento	—	—
1990	I grandi successi di Patty Pravo	—	—
1991	Inediti 72–78	—	—
1993	I grandi successi	—	—
1994	I successi di Patty Pravo	—	—
1994	Successi d'Italia	—	—
1995	Pensieri stupendi	—	—
1996	Superbest	—	—
1997	Divina	—	—
1997	I capolavori	12	92
1997	Grande Patty	—	—
1998	Non ti bastavo più	—	—
1998	Gli anni 70	—	—
1998	Aristocratica	—	—
1998	Le più belle canzoni di Patty Pravo	—	—
1998	Patty Pravo	—	—
1998	A modo mio e altri successi	—	—
1999	I miti musica	—	—
2000	Patty Pravo (3 CD box)	—	—
2000	Le canzoni d'amore	—	—
2000	Super Stars	—	—
2000	I grandi successi originali	—	—
2001	I mitici 45	—	—
2002	100% Patty	47	—
2002	Pravo (3 CD box)	—	—
2003	Le signore della canzone	—	—
2004	Anni '70	—	—
2005	Canzoni stupende	32	—
2005	Le più belle canzoni di Patty Pravo	—	—
2006	Superissimi – Gli eroi del juke box	—	—
2007	I grandi successi (3 CD box)	—	—
2007	Patty Pravo	43	—
2008	The Essential	—	—
2008	Patty Pravo	—	—
2008	Amanti	—	—
2009	Il meglio di Patty Pravo	87	—
2009	Gli album originali (6 CD box)	—	—
2009	The Universal Music Collection (4 CD box)	—	—
2009	Collections	—	—
2009	La mia musica	—	—
2011	Tutto in 3 CD (3 CD box)	—	—
2011	Le più belle canzoni (3 CD box)	—	—
2012	Un'ora con Patty Pravo	—	—
2012	The Singles	—	—
2012	The Lost Records	—	—
2012	Super Best	—	—
2013	Meravigliosamente Patty	30	—
2014	Le più belle canzoni	—	—
2016	Playlist	—	—
2016	The Best of Patty Pravo	—	—
2017	Rarities 1967	—	—
2018	Rarities 1968	—	—
2019	Rarities 1969	—	—
2020	Rarities 1970	—	—
2020	1970 Recording Session	—	—

=== Singles ===
List of singles with peak chart positions
Year	Title	ITA	BEL	GER	NLD	Album	Sales
1966	"Ragazzo triste"	13	—	—	—	Patty Pravo (1968 album)	ITA: 200,000
1967	"Sto con te"	—	—	—	—	—N/a	
1967	"Se perdo te"	18	—	—	—	Patty Pravo (1968 album)	
1968	"La bambola"	1	37	35	11	Patty Pravo (1968 album)	ITA: 1,000,000
1968	"Sentimento" (Note: Actually released with the song "Gli occhi dell'amore" on side A, but listed as "Sentimento" in the Italian sales chart.)	2	—	—	—	—N/a	ITA: 700,000
1968	"Tripoli 1969"	4	—	—	—	Concerto per Patty	ITA: 300,000
1969	"Il paradiso"	8	—	—	—	Concerto per Patty	
1969	"Concerto per Patty"	23	—	—	—	Concerto per Patty	
1969	"Nel giardino dell'amore"	12	—	—	—	—N/a	
1970	"La spada nel cuore"	16	—	—	—	—N/a	
1970	"Per te"	12	—	—	—	Patty Pravo (1970 album)	
1970	"La solitudine" (with Robert Charlebois)	25	—	—	—	Patty Pravo (1970 album)	
1970	"Non andare via"	23	—	—	—	Bravo Pravo	
1970	"Tutt'al più"	4	—	—	—	Bravo Pravo	ITA: 300,000
1971	"Love Story"	10	—	—	—	Di vero in fondo	
1971	"Non ti bastavo più"	6	—	—	—	—N/a	
1972	"Io"	—	—	—	—	Sì... incoerenza	
1973	"Pazza idea"	1	46	—	17	Pazza idea	ITA: 1,500,000
1974	"Come un Pierrot"	7	—	—	—	Mai una signora	
1975	"Incontro"	6	—	—	—	Incontro	
1976	"Tanto"	—	—	—	—	Tanto	
1976	"Grand hotel"	25	—	—	—	Patty Pravo (1976 album)	
1977	"Tutto il mondo è casa mia"	—	—	—	—	—N/a	
1978	"Pensiero stupendo"	2	—	—	—	Miss Italia	
1979	"Sentirti"	—	—	—	—	Miss Italia	
1979	"Autostop"	23	—	—	—	Munich Album	
1984	"Per una bambola"	17	—	—	—	Occulte persuasioni	
1985	"Menù"	20	—	—	—	Per una bambola	
1987	"Pigramente signora"	18	—	—	—	Pigramente signora	
1987	"Contatto"	—	—	—	—	Pigramente signora	
1995	"I giorni dell'armonia"	—	—	—	—	—N/a	
1997	"...E dimmi che non vuoi morire"	2	—	—	—	Bye Bye Patty	ITA: 300,000
1997	"Pensiero stupendo '97"	5	—	—	—	Bye Bye Patty	
1998	"Les etrangers"	—	—	—	—	Notti, guai e libertà	
1998	"Strada per un'altra città"	—	—	—	—	Notti, guai e libertà	
1998	"Emma Bovary"	—	—	—	—	Notti, guai e libertà	
1998	"Angelus"	—	—	—	—	Notti, guai e libertà	
2000	"Una donna da sognare"	11	—	—	—	Una donna da sognare	
2000	"Una mattina d'estate"	—	—	—	—	Una donna da sognare	
2000	"Se chiudi gli occhi"	—	—	—	—	Una donna da sognare	
2002	"L'immenso"	25	—	—	—	Radio Station	
2002	"Noi di là (Lagoinha)"	23	—	—	—	Radio Station	
2004	"Che uomo sei"	13	—	—	—	Nic-Unic	
2008	"La bambola" (re-recording)	—	—	—	—	—N/a	
2009	"E io verrò un giorno là"	24	—	—	—	Live Arena di Verona – Sold Out	
2011	"Unisono"	—	—	—	—	Nella terra dei pinguini	
2011	"Il vento e le rose"	26	—	—	—	Nella terra dei pinguini	
2011	"La vita è qui"	—	—	—	—	Nella terra dei pinguini	
2012	"Com'è bello far l'amore"	—	—	—	—	Com'è bello far l'amore (soundtrack)	
2012	"La luna"	32	—	—	—	Meravigliosamente Patty	
2013	"Non mi interessa" (with Ermal Meta)	97	—	—	—	—N/a	
2016	"Cieli immensi"	16	—	—	—	Eccomi	ITA: 25,000
2016	"Per difenderti da me"	—	—	—	—	Eccomi	
2019	"Un po' come la vita" (with Briga)	61	—	—	—	Red	
2019	"Pianeti"	—	—	—	—	Red	
2025	"Ho provato tutto"	—	—	—	—	Opera	
2025	"Ratatan"	—	—	—	—	Opera	
2026	"Opera"	82	—	—	—	Opera	
2026	"Ti lascio una canzone"	—	—	—	—	Opera	

== Participation at festivals ==
=== Sanremo Music Festival ===
- 1970: "La spada nel cuore" (with Little Tony) – 5th place
- 1984: "Per una bambola" – 10th place and critics' award
- 1987: "Pigramente signora" – 20th place
- 1995: "I giorni dell'armonia" – 20th place
- 1997: "...E dimmi che non vuoi morire" – 8th place and critics' award
- 2002: "L'immenso" – 16th place
- 2009: "E io verrò un giorno là" – Finalist
- 2011: "Il vento e le rose" – Eliminated on the second night
- 2016: "Cieli immensi" – 6th place and critics' award
- 2019: "Un po' come la vita" (with Briga) – 21st place
- 2026: "Opera" – 24th place

=== Festivalbar ===
- 1969: "Il paradiso"
- 1970: "Per te"
- 1974: "Quale signora"
- 1975: "Incontro"
- 1976: "Tanto" – outside the contest
- 1978: "Johnny" – outside the contest
- 1985: "Menù"
- 1987: "Contatto"
- 1989: "Oltre l'Eden..."
- 1997: "Pensiero stupendo"
- 1998: "Les etrangers" and "Strada per un'altra città"
- 2000: "Una donna da sognare" and "Una mattina d'estate"

== Filmography ==
- 1967: Una ragazza tutta d'oro
- 1967: L'immensità (La ragazza del Paip's)
- 1967: I ragazzi di bandiera gialla
- 1967: Il ragazzo che sapeva amare
- 1968: The Most Beautiful Couple in the World
- 2014: Xenia

== Autobiographies ==
- 2007: Bla, bla, bla...
- 2017: La cambio io la vita che... Tutta la mia storia
- 2020: Minaccia bionda. A modo mio sempre controtempo
