= Dwelling (album) =

Studio album by Melissa Greener
- Released: January 12, 2010
- Genre: Singer-songwriter
- Length: 44:31
- Label: Anima Records
- Producer: John Jennings

Melissa Greener chronology
Fall from the Sky (2006)	Dwelling (2010)	Transistor Corazón (2013)

Dwelling is the second album by American singer-songwriter Melissa Greener; it was released on January 12, 2010. The album was produced by John Jennings who has produced several albums for Mary Chapin Carpenter. It was recorded and mixed by Jennings at Red Hill in Charlottesville, Virginia. The album cover's photography and art was by Traci Goudie.

One of the tracks on the album, "Bullets to Bite", won first prize in the folk category of the 2009 USA Songwriting Competition. Greener performed "Bullets to Bite" in episode 13 in series 1 of the television documentary Troubadour, TX, first aired on February 10, 2012.

== Track listing ==
No.	Title	Lyrics & music	Length
1.	"Bullets To Bite"	Melissa Greener	3:54
2.	"On My Way Back Home"	Melissa Greener	4:48
3.	"Ballad of the Snow Leopard and the Tanqueray Cowboy"	David Rodriguez	3:45
4.	"Paris"	Melissa Greener	5:45
5.	"It Gets Harder To Leave Texas Every Time"	Jonathan Byrd	3:12
6.	"My Country Home in Summer Glow"	Melissa Greener	4:39
7.	"Crazy"	Melissa Greener	5:00
8.	"All I Know"	Melissa Greener	4:31
9.	"Tack & Jibe"	Melissa Greener	3:27
10.	"Harvest Moon"	Neil Young	5:30
