= Transistor Corazón =

Studio album by Melissa Greener
- Released: 14 June 2013
- Genre: Singer-songwriter
- Length: 41:54
- Label: Anima Records
- Producer: Brad Jones

Melissa Greener chronology
Dwelling (2010)	Transistor Corazón (2013)

Professional ratings
Review scores
Source	Rating
The Daily Telegraph	4.5/5 stars

Transistor Corazón is the third album by American singer-songwriter Melissa Greener. It was released on 14 June 2013 by Anima Records.

Produced by Brad Jones, it has been described as fusing "modernist poetry with soulful 1960s Laurel Canyon". According to Greener the album's name comes from the English/Spanish word "transistor", a device that amplifies, alters or changes the direction of an electrical signal, and from "corazón", the Spanish for "heart". The songs are about the themes of love and the complexity and short-circuitry of romantic intimacy. The album's title song was co-written by Greener with singer-songwriter David Rodriguez.

== Reception ==
In a 4.5-starred review, The Daily Telegraph's Culture Editor, Martin Chilton, described Transistor Corazón as an "album of depth" and her songwriting as "classy".

Malcolm Carter, writing for Penny Black Magazine, described her as "an exceptional talent". Greener, he said, "displays a toughness, an edge to her vocals, that makes everything she sings believable. She really does make the listener part of the songs, it would appear that there is nothing fake about Greener or the music she makes... Every word that [she] sings is dripping with soul... The combination of Greener's distinctive vocals and the Greenfield Guitars she plays is a winning one."

Allan Wilkinson, reviewing the album for Northern Sky, described it as an "intoxicating brew of fine melodies and inspired lyrics... Transistor Corazón bears all the hall marks of a breakthrough album, and not too soon".

Neil King, writing for FATEA magazine, said: "The dominating sound across 'Transistor Corazón' is that of the torch ballad and Greener's confident, emotion laden, vocal ensures that the songs sound like they could flare at any moment giving the album an inherent tension that she tries to resolve with the lyric."

Belgium's Rootstime magazine said that Melissa Greener "continues to grow as a singer but also as a songwriter and entertainer... an artist whose career development we will follow with healthy interest."

Fred Schmale, for the Netherlands' Real Roots Cafe, praised Greener's cover version of The Beatles' song "If I Fell" and, in particular, the string arrangements.

Erwin Zijleman for the Dutch website De krenten uit de pop, described the album as "the best roots album I have heard for ages" and "the third of Melissa Greener's highly addictive catalog... Melissa Greener's voice has no equal".

Germany's Wasser-Prawda – Musik under Meer (Music and More) cultural magazine praised Greener's "voluptuously arranged folk poems", helping you paint a "dreamy atmosphere". One minute you are "in the middle of a Mexican fiesta"; the next, you are forty miles out of Jackson pondering the meaning of a broken love affair.

Italy's Roots Highway described Transistor Corazón as "a classic product of the new independent roots music" and Melissa Greener as "an artist who is certainly finding her own way". The title track, it said, is "a gem...as if Joan Baez sang a piece of Tom Russell".

== Track listing ==
No	Title	Lyrics and music	Length
1	"Everybody Wants Some"	Melissa Greener	5:00
2	"The Mess Love Made"	Melissa Greener	3:30
3	"With the Weather"	Melissa Greener	3:35
4	"Ghost in the Van"	Melissa Greener	4:10
5	"Transistor Corazón"	Melissa Greener/ David Rodriguez	5:00
6	"Jackson"	Melissa Greener/ BettySoo	3:52
7	"Why"	Melissa Greener/ Jacob Svendsen	3:01
8	"That's What Makes You Strong"	Melissa Greener/ Jesse Winchester	3:32
9	"If I Fell"	Lennon/McCartney	2:58
10	"Always"	Melissa Greener/ Parisch Browne	3:18
11	"Inisheer"	Melissa Greener/ Kyra Shaughnessey	5:16
