= Severland =

Studio album by Blame Sally
- Released: May 8, 2007
- Recorded: 2007
- Genre: Folk rock, Blues rock
- Length: 54:18
- Label: Ninth Street Opus

Severland is an album released by Blame Sally. Their third release, it was published by 2007 by Ninth Street Opus.

== Track listing ==
No.	Title	Writer(s)	Length
1.	"Severland"	Renee Harcourt	6:37
2.	"Fillmore Street"	Monica Pasqual	4:40
3.	"House of the Living"	Renee Harcourt, Billy Lee Lewis, B.Z. Lewis	5:13
4.	"If You Tell a Lie"	Monica Pasqual	3:48
5.	"Besalu"	Monica Pasqual	3:17
6.	"A Thousand Tiny Pieces"	Sean Hayes	4:01
7.	"Moth to a Flame"	Renee Harcourt	3:14
8.	"Give a Damn"	Monica Pasqual	5:42
9.	"Trouble"	Pam Delgado, Alicia Buelow	4:10
10.	"Orange"	Renee Harcourt	3:22
11.	"Devil to Pay"	Monica Pasqual	6:15
12.	"Long Time With You"	Renee Harcourt	4:06

== Personnel ==
- Pam Delgado – Vocals, percussion, drums, organ
- Renee Harcourt – Vocals, acoustic guitar, slide guitar, electric guitar, lap steel guitar, banjo, bass, percussion, harmonica
- Jeri Jones – Vocals, acoustic guitar, electric guitar, slide guitar, bass, guitarron
- Monica Pasqual – Vocals, piano, accordion, keyboards, organ, percussion

=== Additional personnel ===
- Chris Kee – Upright bass, cello
- Julie Wolf – Accordion
- Jon Evans – Bass
- Produced by Blame Sally at The Laurel Way Studio (Mill Valley, CA))
- Engineered by Renee Harcourt and Jon Evans
- Mixed by Mark Pistel and Bob Edwards
- Mastered by Ken Lee Mastering
