= Double Panther =

Studio album by Diego's Umbrella
- Released: 2009
- Recorded: 2008
- Genre: Rock
- Length: 49:25
- Label: Ninth Street Opus
- Producer: Diego's Umbrella

Diego's Umbrella chronology
Viva la Juerga (2007)	Double Panther (2009)	Richardson b/w Downtown (2010)

Double Panther is the third album released by Diego's Umbrella.

== Track listing ==
All song written, performed and arranged by Diego's Umbrella.

No.	Title	Length
1.	"Theme of the Double Panther"	1:22
2.	"Kings of Vibration"	3:49
3.	"Lasers 'n Lesbians"	3:34
4.	"Der Badkhen Freylekh"	3:27
5.	"Strange Torpedo"	3:50
6.	"Eckersley"	1:06
7.	"The Assassination of a Japanese Businessman"	5:10
8.	"California Red"	3:32
9.	"Wasted Again"	3:37
10.	"Khosid Wedding Dance"	3:05
11.	"Swayze"	2:43
12.	"The New 17"	4:11

== Personnel ==
- Tyson Maulhardt – Electric Guitar, Vocals
- Vaughn Lindstrom – Acoustic Guitar, Vocals
- Ben Leon – Vocals, Electric Guitar, Percussion
- Jason Kleinberg – Violin, Vocals, Accordion
- Jake Wood – Drums
- Kevin Blair – Bass
- Liz King – Soprano
- Chris Brown – Trumpet
- Joe Morais – Piano
- Brahm Sheray – Strings

== Production ==
- Produced by Diego's Umbrella
- Recorded at Prairie Sun Studios, San Pablo Recorders and Awesometown
- Engineered and Mixed by Bond Bergland and Diego's Umbrella
- Mastered by Michael Romanowski
