= Live at Stern Grove =

Live at Stern Grove Festival

Live album by Blame Sally
- Released: 10 July 2010
- Recorded: 2009
- Genre: Folk rock, blues rock
- Length: 39:29
- Label: Ninth Street Opus
- Producer: Blame Sally

Blame Sally chronology
Night of 1000 Stars (2009)	Live at Stern Grove Festival (2010)	Speeding Ticket and A Valentine (2011)

Live at Stern Grove is the fifth album released by Blame Sally. The album was recorded live in July 2009 at the Stern Grove Festival.

== Track listing ==
No.	Title	Writer(s)	Length
1.	"Fillmore Street"	Monica Pasqual	4:39
2.	"Jump Start"	Renee Harcourt	4:23
3.	"Trouble"	Pam Delgado, Alicia Buelow, Jeri Jones	5:03
4.	"La Llorona"	Traditional	5:05
5.	"All Rise"	Renee Harcourt	4:38
6.	"Pass the Buddha"	Renee Harcourt	4:52
7.	"Night of 1,000 Stars"	Monica Pasqual	6:32
8.	"Hurricane"	Pam Delgado, Alicia Buelow	5:31

== Personnel ==
- Monica Pasqual – Vocals, keyboard, accordion
- Jeri Jones – Mandolin, electric guitar, acoustic guitar, slide guitar
- Pam Delgado – Percussion, vocals
- Renee Harcourt – Acoustic guitar, vocals, harmonica
- Rob Strom – Bass

== Production ==
- Producer – Blame Sally
- Recorded by Tony Brooke
- Mixed by Wayne Skeen (Ninth Street Opus Studios)
- Mastered by Ken Lee
- Photography – Tom Erikson, Scott Wall
- Design – Renee Harcourt
