= Viva la Juerga =

Studio album by Diego's Umbrella
- Released: 16 October 2007
- Recorded: 2006
- Genre: Rock
- Length: 39:53
- Label: Ninth Street Opus
- Producer: Diego's Umbrella

Diego's Umbrella chronology
Kung Fu Palace (2006)	Viva la Juerga (2007)	Double Panther (2008)

Viva la Juerga is the second album released by Diego's Umbrella.

== Track listing ==
All song written, performed and arranged by Diego's Umbrella.

No.	Title	Length
1.	"Das Borjka"	3:33
2.	"Gypsy Confidential"	3:32
3.	"The Fiberoptic Elflord" (Plight of the Gastronauts pt. I)	4:12
4.	"Theme of the Glowing Amigo" (Plight of the Gastronauts pt. II)	2:21
5.	"Viva la Juerga"	2:56
6.	"Here as I Lay"	3:42
7.	"MTV Brasil"	4:03
8.	"Pants!"	2:20
9.	"Beastslayer of Valenar" (Plight of the Gastronauts pt. III)	3:37
10.	"Kalashnikov"	2:41
11.	"Doppleganger"	4:31
12.	"Voyage to Tarnihan" (Plight of the Gastronauts pt. IV)	2:25

== Personnel ==
- Tyson Maulhardt – Electric guitar, vocals
- Vaughn Lindstrom – Acoustic guitar, vocals
- Ben Leon – Vocals, electric guitar, percussion
- Marcus Schmidt – Bass
- Jason Kleinberg – Violin, vocals, accordion
- Jake Wood – Drums

== Production ==
- Produced by Diego's Umbrella
- Recorded at Prairie Sun Studios, San Pablo Recorders and Awesometown
- Engineered by Bond Bergland
- Mastered by Michael Romanowski
