= Give Me All You Got =

Studio album by Carrie Rodriguez
- Released: January 22, 2013
- Studio: Fantasy Studios
- Genre: Folk rock, blues rock, Americana
- Label: Ninth Street Opus
- Producer: Lee Townsend

Carrie Rodriguez chronology
We Still Love Our Country (2011)	Give Me All You Got (2013)

Professional ratings
Review scores
Source	Rating
Consequence of Sound	3/5 stars

Give Me All You Got is the sixth album by Carrie Rodriguez, and was released in 2013. It was recorded at Fantasy Studios in Berkeley, California and was produced by Lee Townsend.

== Background ==
The album was released two years after Rodriguez returned to her home town in Austin, after she had lived in Brooklyn, New York, and "had a second to reflect on [her] life". Two songs on the album, "Sad Joy" and "Devil in Mind" were collaborations with songwriter Chip Taylor. When asked if the album had a common lyrical theme, she answered that "A lot of these songs are about feeling intense emotion and letting it be out in the open. Not shying away."

Rodriguez explained in an interview that the inspiration for "Sad Joy" was a conversation with Taylor about "pretty heavy things like family members with terminal illness and deaths of friends (and) how those terrible sad things can also come with a lot of beauty. There's something about getting together with people even if it is during a tragic event that brings about a really joyful energy. It's a communal feeling, a deep connection". They wrote it "in about 10 minutes," she said to Michael Bialas of the Huffington Post.

== Critical reception ==
Hal Horowitz of American Songwriter rated the album 80/100 on Metacritic (4 out of 5 on American Songwriter), saying "Her violin skills are world class but play second fiddle—pun intended— to potent songwriting and vocals. Emotional lyrics rooted in letting go of attachments and propping others up are wonderfully communicated with low boil intensity. Old cohort Chip Taylor writes or co-composes a handful of songs including the opening 'Devil in Mind' that combines Rodriguez's Austin rustic roots with the urban influences she has acquired through a decade of living in Brooklyn... The result is her finest, most poignant and accomplished album in an already impressive seven year solo career."

Lee Zimmerman of Blurt gave her a 7 out of 10, saying "Even on a song like 'Devil In Mind', which seemingly pays such heed to moss-covered Gothic-like environs, she still manages to exude some saucy spunk and spark... Give Me All You Got is as seductive and enticing as its name implies because clearly, Rodriguez is giving all she has as well."

Cara Tillman of the Austin Chronicle noted that the album Give Me All You Got "plays out as a hymn to the free-spirited sinner who embraces the compulsion for adventure, as well as the need to put down roots."

== Track listing ==
No.	Title	Length
1.	"Devil in Mind"	3:59
2.	"Sad Joy"	3:06
3.	"I Cry for Love"	3:39
4.	"Lake Harriet"	3:10
5.	"Get Back in Love"	4:43
6.	"Tragic"	3:29
7.	"Cut Me Now"	4:44
8.	"Whiskey Runs Thicker Than Blood"	4:00
9.	"Devil in Mind (Instrumental)"	3:05
10.	"Brooklyn"	3:06
11.	"I Don't Mind Waiting"	4:01

== Personnel ==
- Erik Deutsch - keyboards
- Don Heffington - drums, percussion
- Hans Holzen - vocals, acoustic guitar, electric guitar, lap steel guitar, mandolin
- Luke Jacobs - vocals, acoustic guitar, electric guitar, lap steel guitar
- Kyle Kegerreis - acoustic bass, electric bass
- Carrie Rodriguez - vocals, tenor guitar, fiddle

== Chart performance ==
Chart (2013)	Peak position
US Billboard Top Country Albums	62
