= Proper Cowboy =

Studio album by Diego's Umbrella
- Released: 17 July 2012
- Recorded: 2012
- Genre: Rock
- Length: 35:37
- Label: Ninth Street Opus
- Producer: Diego's Umbrella

Diego's Umbrella chronology
Richardson b/w Downtown EP (2010)	Proper Cowboy (2012)

Proper Cowboy is the fourth album released by Diego's Umbrella, released in July 2012.

Proper Cowboy marks the band's first time collaboration with San Francisco producers The Rondo Brothers (MC Lars, Foster the People), as well as their second release under the Ninth Street Opus record label. The union has resulted in a new spin on the familiar sound that has been referred to as a "futuristic Spaghetti-Western soundtrack" that features a cover of 1972 Sonny and Cher song, "A Cowboy's Work Is Never Done". Additionally, "Bulletproof Shine" marks a collaboration with Angelo Moore (leader of Fishbone), who adds his vocals and theremin to the track.

Julia R. DeStefano of Performer Magazine says of the album that it "easily places them in the 'best kept secret-turned next big thing' category." Fun Fun Fun Media said, "Diego’s Umbrella is like Gogol Bordello meets Queen."

== Track listing ==
All song written, performed and arranged by Diego's Umbrella.

No.	Title	Length
1.	"Thrash Mexican Budapest"	5:56
2.	"Downtown"	3:40
3.	"A Cowboy's Work Is Never Done" (Sonny Bono)	3:12
4.	"Richardson"	3:23
5.	"Six Little Fools"	2:40
6.	"Big Star"	2:59
7.	"Tightrope"	2:21
8.	"Bulletproof Shine"	3:10
9.	"Moneymaker"	2:53
10.	"Amsterdam pt. 1"	1:53
11.	"Amsterdam pt. 2"	3:30

== Personnel ==
- Tyson Maulhardt – Electric Guitar, Vocals
- Vaughn Lindstrom – Acoustic Guitar, Vocals
- Ben Leon – Vocals, Electric Guitar, Percussion
- Jason Kleinberg – Violin, Vocals, Accordion
- Jake Wood – Drums

Additional personnel

- Angelo Moore – Theremin, Vox
- Brahm Sheray – Bass (Richardson, Bulletproof Shine, Amsterdam, Big Star)
- Bob Menacho – Bass (Tightrope, Moneymaker)
- Kevin Blair – Bass (Downtown, Thrash)
- Jim Greer – Piano, Synthesizer, Accordion, Strings, Drum
- Brandon Arnovick – Beats
- Olga Kapustina – Asst. Engineering (Moneymaker), Additional Strings (Downtown)

Additional singers

- Mike Choinard
- Katie Bishop
- Marta Skeen
- Larry May
- Alisa Saario
- Noel Garcia
- Christine Kemp
- Estee Schwartz
- Matthew Smith
- Olga Kapustina

== Production ==
- Produced and Mixed by The Rondo Brothers
- Engineered by Calvin Turnbull and The Rondo Brothers
- Mastered by The Rondo Brothers
- Artwork by Kelsey Brookes
- Art Photography by Roy Porello
