= Carrie Rodriguez Live in Louisville =

Live album by Carrie Rodriguez
- Released: September 16, 2009
- Recorded: 2009
- Genres: Rock, folk rock, blues rock
- Length: 45:03
- Label: Ninth Street Opus

Carrie Rodriguez chronology
She Ain't Me (2008)	Carrie Rodriguez Live in Louisville (2009)	Love and Circumstance (2010)

Carrie Rodriguez Live in Louisville is the third album released by American singer-songwriter Carrie Rodriguez. Live in Louisville was recorded at the Brown Theatre in Louisville, Kentucky.

== Track listing ==
No.	Title	Length
1.	"Dirty Leather" (Chip Taylor)	4:10
2.	"Seven Angels on a Bicycle" (Carrie Rodriguez, Chip Taylor)	4:35
3.	"Before You Say Another Word" (Chip Taylor)	2:59
4.	"I Don't Want To Play House Anymore" (Carrie Rodriguez, Chip Taylor)	2:21
5.	"Blackberry Blossom" (Traditional)	2:40
6.	"Got Your Name On It" (Chip Taylor)	4:22
7.	"Mask of Moses" (Carrie Rodriguez, Kyle Kegerreis)	5:20
8.	"Big Kiss" (Chip Taylor)	5:07
9.	"You Won't Be Satisfied That Way" (Jimmie Davis and Lloyd Ellis)	3:48
10.	"50's French Movie" (Chip Taylor)	3:09
11.	"Never Gonna Be Your Bride" (Carrie Rodriguez, Chip Taylor)	3:07
12.	"St. Peter's" (Chip Taylor)	5:53

== Personnel ==
- Carrie Rodriguez – Vocals, mandobird, fiddle
- Hans Holzen – Backing vocals, electric Guitar
- Kyle Kegerreis – Backing vocals, acoustic Bass
- Sam Baker – Drums

Recorded and mixed live by Kevin Madigan at W.L. Lyons Brown Theatre in Louisville, Kentucky
