= Night of 1000 Stars =

Studio album by Blame Sally
- Released: 5 May 2009
- Recorded: 2009
- Genres: Folk rock, blues rock
- Length: 54:57
- Label: Ninth Street Opus
- Producer: Blame Sally

Blame Sally chronology
Severland (2007)	Night of 1000 Stars (2009)	Live at Stern Grove (2010)

Night of 1000 Stars is the fourth album released by Blame Sally.

== Track listing ==
No.	Title	Writer(s)	Length
1.	"Night of 1000 Stars"	Monica Pasqual	6:07
2.	"Over You"	Renee Harcourt	3:58
3.	"Vera Chiesa"	Renee Harcourt	4:47
4.	"Hurricane"	Pam Delgado, Alicia Buelow	4:01
5.	"I'm Waiting"	Monica Pasqual	5:56
6.	"All Rise"	Renee Harcourt	5:56
7.	"Jump Start"	Renee Harcourt	3:54
8.	"Constance, No More"	Monica Pasqual	5:34
9.	"Pass the Buddha"	Renee Harcourt	4:05
10.	"Golden Gate"	Renee Harcourt	4:50
11.	"Fear of Flying"	Pam Delgado, Alicia Bueno	4:43
12.	"Wood, A Hammer and a Nail"	Monica Pasqual	5:19

== Personnel ==
- Monica Pasqual – vocals, piano, accordion, harmonium, keyboard
- Jeri Jones – mandolin, guitar, slide guitar, vocals, bass
- Pam Delgado – drums, percussion, vocals, harmonium, acoustic guitar
- Renee Harcourt – guitar, mandolin, vocals, harmonica, banjo, bass, lapsteel

=== Additional personnel ===
- Rob Strom – bass
- BZ Lewis – electric guitar
- Michaelle Goerlitz – pandeiro
- Shweta Jhaveri – vocal
- Irene Sazer – violin

== Production ==
- Producer – Lee Townsend
- Recording engineers – Shawn Pierce, Adam Munoz
- Mixing engineer- Shawn Pierce
- Mastering engineer – Greg Calbi
- Additional recording – David Luke (Ninth Street Opus Studio, Berkeley, CA), BZ Lewis (Studio 132, Oakland, CA), Renee Harcourt (The Laurel Way Studio, Mill Valley, CA)
- Recorded and mixed at Ninth Street Opus Studio, Berkeley, CA
- Mastered at Sterling Sound New York, NY
- Cover illustration – Hugh Andrade and Mati McDonough
- Photography – Michal Venera
- Design – Renee Harcourt
