= Kung Fu Palace =

Studio album by Diego's Umbrella
- Released: September 2005
- Recorded: 2004
- Genre: Rock
- Length: 37:40
- Producer: Diego's Umbrella

Diego's Umbrella chronology
Kung Fu Palace (2005)	Viva la Juerga (2007)

Kung Fu Palace is the first album released by Diego's Umbrella.

== Track listing ==
All song written, performed and arranged by Diego's Umbrella.

No.	Title	Length
1.	"Drinking in Spanish"	3:14
2.	"The Revenge of Wilmot"	4:11
3.	"Never Hit the Ground"	3:42
4.	"Cielito Lindo"	1:15
5.	"Julianna"	4:05
6.	"Theme of the Mexican Ninja"	3:09
7.	"Kung Fu Fondu"	3:53
8.	"Rose of Jerico"	4:22
9.	"Sonata in F Major"	0:44
10.	"Waltz of Anne-Marie"	5:28
11.	"The Last Stand"	3:37

== Personnel ==
- Tyson Maulhardt – Electric guitar
- Vaughn Lindstrom – Acoustic guitar
- Michael Pinkham – Drums
- Kevin Blair – Upright Bass

=== Additional personnel ===
- Yair Evnine – Cello, Electric guitar, Lapsteel Guitar
- Jason Kleinberg – Violin
- Mike Hicks – Vocals
- Arlen Ginsberg – Accordion
- Renee Tyler – Piano
- Prince Marvelous – Facehorn

== Production ==
- Produced by John Anaya
- Coproduced by Diego's Umbrella
- Recorded at Prairie Sun Studios & Humpback Studios
- Mixed by John Anaya
- Mastered by John Cuniberti
