= Carrie Rodriguez =

American singer-songwriter

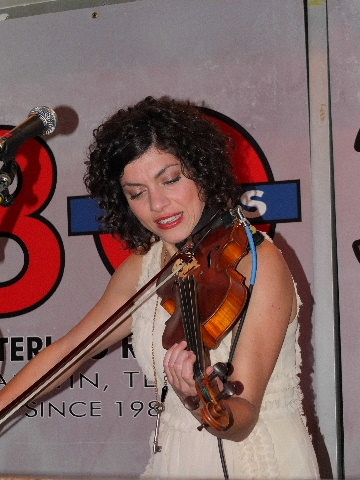
- Carrie performing at Waterloo Records in Austin, Texas in 2013

Background information
- Born: Carrie Luz Rodriguez; July 31, 1978 (age 47); Austin, Texas, U.S.
- Genres: Country
- Occupation(s): Musician, songwriter
- Instruments: Vocals; fiddle; mandobird; guitar
- Years active: 2002–present
- Labels: Ninth Street Opus
- Website: carrierodriguez.com

Carrie Luz Rodriguez (born July 31, 1978) is an American singer-songwriter and the daughter of Texan singer-songwriter David Rodriguez and Texas painter Katy Nail, and is the granddaughter of prolific Texas essayist Frances Nail. She sings and plays the fiddle, mandobird and tenor guitar.

Her touring band members include Luke Jacobs (acoustic and electric guitar, vocals, lap steel guitar, pedal steel), Hans Holzen (acoustic and electric guitar, vocal, lap steel guitar, mandolin), Erik Deutsch (keyboards), Kyle Kegerreis (acoustic and electric bass), and Don Heffington (drums, percussion).

== Early life ==
Rodriguez started taking Suzuki Violin Lessons at her public elementary school at age 5. Her teacher, Bill Dick, remained her principal violin teacher until she left Austin at age 17 to begin music conservatory. When asked why she chose to learn Violin at such a young age, she admits "I was really bad at nap-time. I would talk through the whole thing. And I already had a parent/teacher conference about it. I remember getting up to go to the bathroom and walking down the hall during nap-time and hearing the little squawky beginner violin playing 'Twinkle, Twinkle, Little Star.' And I just remember thinking, 'Oh, man, this is what I should be doing. Not laying in there bored.'"

She was awarded a scholarship to Oberlin Conservatory and studied under Roland and Almita Vamos for one year (1996). Her father, David Rodriguez, took her on tour with him in Europe when she was a teen, and after sitting through a sound check with her dad's old friend Lyle Lovett, she decided to leave Oberlin and set herself on course to become a fiddler at the Berklee College of Music under the tutelage of renowned fiddler, Matt Glaser, graduating in 2000. There, her teacher, Matt Glaser, and her fellow students, including roommate Casey Driessen, helped her "find my groove and let go of that wall I had put up as a classical player."

== Career ==
=== 2001–2009: Early career ===
In 2001 Chip Taylor asked Rodriguez to join his European tour after seeing her play with the artist Hayseed during SXSW, which featured a showcase of artists of Hispanic ancestry. The list of performers was narrow in focus but inspired: Carlos Santana, Los Lobos, Linda Ronstadt, Gloria Estefan, Jose Feliciano, and Carrie Rodriguez. TODO Austin called her the outlier, who was running "on the strength of a career only a decade old, [but] already so highly regarded that she's not only captured the heart of Americana music aficionados but infused the Latino community with a singular dose of Ameri-Chicana pride."

She recorded her first duet album, Let's Leave This Town, with Chip Taylor in 2002 for Trainwreck Records. They toured extensively in Europe, performing on the TV show Top of the Pops as well as appearing on numerous BBC National Radio programs. Chip Taylor and Carrie Rodriguez also appeared on NPR radio program, Weekend Edition, and appeared in a feature article in The New York Times' "Sunday Arts" section in 2003.

After four duet records with Taylor, she released her debut solo album, Seven Angels on a Bicycle, on August 15, 2006. She released her second album, She Ain't Me on August 5, 2008.

On September 29, 2008, a three-song live acoustic video performance premiered on LiveDaily Sessions, featuring Rodriguez performing the songs "Absence," "El Salvador" and "Can't Cry Enough".

Carrie Rodriguez Live in Louisville 2009, featured her opening set in Louisville while she toured with Lucinda Williams.

=== 2009–2011: Ninth Street Opus releases ===
Rodriguez signed with Ninth Street Opus on October 10, 2009 and on April 13, 2010, she released her album of cover songs, Love and Circumstance. This album included songs by Hank Williams, John Hiatt and Lucinda Williams, and was one of the Top 20 Albums of 2010 (Americana Music Association).

Carrie appeared on the Mountain Stage in Buckhannon, WV in 2008. She has performed as a solo artist on Austin City Limits (2008). Her recent duo in We Still Love Our Country with Romantica lead singer Ben Kyle went to the top 10 on the AMA radio charts in Feb 2011.

Additionally, she has recorded and/or performed with John Prine, John Mayer, Alejandro Escovedo, Los Lonely Boys, Bruce Hornsby, Robert Earl Keen, Los Lobos, Patty Griffin. She has been interviewed and/or performed on the NPR radio programs: Latino USA, Mountain Stage, A Prairie Home Companion, and World Cafe.

In August 2011 she toured the U.S. with Jeff Bridges, with whom she also appeared on Austin City Limits, Today, Live with Regis and Kelly, The Colbert Report and The Tonight Show with Jay Leno.

=== 2012 and onward ===
Carrie also helped co-produce the album The Fantastic Expedition, by Erik & Sanne, released June 5, 2012, pulling together many Texas musicians, such as Earl Poole Ball (Johnny Cash's piano player), Lloyd Maines (father of Dixie Chicks member Natalie Maines), Luke Jacobs, and more. She even played fiddle on nearly every track for them.

In 2012, her extensive tours to Europe continued in various countries including Germany, Italy, and the United Kingdom during the later half of the year. She performed in shows along with Chip Taylor and Luke Jacobs in venues varying from coffee shops such as Caffé Teatro in Italy, to steakhouse saloons such as Cowboy Up in Belgium, to Hotels such as the Victoria Hotel in Anglesey, Wales.

On January 17, 2013, Carrie was honored by the city of Austin with an official "Carrie Rodriguez Day" (and each year going forward). The city's proclamation is in recognition of Carrie's "work in advancing Austin as the 'Live Music Capital of the World'."

To start off her tour for the year Carrie Rodriguez performed for the Black Tie & Boots Inaugural Ball presented by the Texas State Society for President Barack Obama's inauguration.

On January 22, 2013, her new album Give Me All You Got will be released. Rodriguez went to West Virginia Public Broadcasting's Mountain Stage on November 18, 2012, to record a set for national broadcast in advance of the album's release. Her plans for the year include a tour schedule booked through April in the U.S. Give Me All You Got contains a song called "I Cry For Love," of which Rodriguez said, "This was a true gift. It came from one of our greatest songwriters of all time, in my humble opinion, Chip Taylor. Chip, just out of the blue, sent me this song as an MP3 file in an email and said 'Carrie, I wrote this song for you. It's custom written and you better record it because I think it's a hit.' So I said ‘All right.' It's such a powerful song and I almost feel like I wrote it because I feel so close to it."

Carrie Rodriguez says of her own musical influences, "Hopefully, a little of everything that goes into my ears influences what comes out. I’ve never been one to stick to any particular genre... whether it's sung or instrumental, written this year or 300 years ago, music with soul still moves me in the same way that it always did."

Michael Bialas from the Huffington Post noted that "Carrie Rodriguez just might be the hardest-working woman in American roots music.... That's not surprising coming from the adventurous Rodriguez, who seemingly is either always on tour or in the studio.... Give Me All You Got is an example of Rodriguez at her freewheeling best, an inspired mix of passion and energy that captures the spirit of her feel-the-burn live shows."

== Personal life ==
As of 2023, Rodriguez's life partner is guitarist Luke Jacobs, who is also one of her musical collaborators. They have a son.

== Discography ==
=== Solo albums ===
Title	Album details	Peak positions
Title	Album details	US Country
Seven Angels on a Bicycle	Release date: 2006; Label: Back Porch/Train Wreck	—
She Ain't Me	Release date: 2008; Label: Manhattan/Back Porch	—
Carrie Rodriguez Live in Louisville	Release date: 2009; Label: Luz Music Ltd.	—
Love and Circumstance	Release date: April 13, 2010; Label: Ninth Street Opus	—
Live & Circumstance	Release date: 2010; Label: Radio Special	—
Give Me All You Got	Release date: 2013; Label: Ninth Street Opus	62
Live at the Cactus	Release date: January 2014; Label: Self Release	No. 1 on AMA
Lola	Release date: February 16, 2016; Label: Luz Records; Bilingual 2016 ranchera-inspired album featuring Bill Frisell and Raul Malo.	
"—" denotes releases that did not chart

=== Albums with Chip Taylor ===
- Let's Leave This Town (2002) Train Wreck Records
- The Trouble with Humans (2003) Train Wreck
- Angel of the Morning (7 track live EP) (2004) Train Wreck
- Red Dog Tracks (2005) Back Porch/Train Wreck
- Live from the Ruhr Triennale (2007) Train Wreck
- The New Bye & Bye (2010) Train Wreck

=== EP with Ben Kyle of Romantica ===
- We Still Love Our Country (2010) Ninth Street Opus

=== Other appearances ===
- 1992: David Rodriguez – Landing 92 (Brambus) – track 1, "Constant War"
- 1998: Philip Rodriguez – River Through The Sun (Jaguar Night/Recovery Recordings) accompanying violin throughout the album
- 2001: The Wayfaring Strangers – Shifting Sands Of Time (Rounder)
- 2002: The Darlings – New Depression (Artist Friendly)
- 2002: various artists – 107.1 KGSR Radio Austin – Broadcasts Vol.10 – "Sweet Tequila Blues" with Chip Taylor
- 2005: Audrey Auld Mezera – Texas (Reckless) fiddle and vocals on "One Eye"
- 2006: Chip Taylor – Unglorious Hallelujah (Red Red Rose & Other Songs of Love, Pain & Destruction) (Back Porch) backing vocals
- 2006: Eric Hanke – Autumn Blues (Ten Foot Texan)
- 2007: various artists – Like a Hurricane: A Tribute to Neil Young (Uncut) – "Cortez the Killer" with Tim Easton
- 2007: John Platania: Blues, Waltzes And Badland Borders (Train Wreck)
- 2007: A Prairie Home Companion – guest appearance with Hans Holzen and Kyle Kegerreis
- 2007: Kendel Carson – Rearview Mirror Tears (Train Wreck)
- 2008: Tish Hinojosa – Our Little Planet (Continental Song City) – track 3, "Mi Pueblo"
- 2011: Los Lonely Boys – Rockpango (Lonelytone / Playing in Traffic) – track 13, "Smile.2"
- 2012: Erik & Sanne – De Fantastische Expeditie (ENS)
- 2015: Asleep at the Wheel – Still the King: Celebrating the Music of Bob Wills and His Texas Playboys (Proper Records) – track 16, "A Good Man Is Hard To Find"
- 2017: Pieta Brown – Postcards (Lustre Records) – track 6, "Stopped My Horse"

== See also ==
- Music of Austin
