= Fall from the Sky (album) =

Studio album by Melissa Greener
- Released: January 18, 2006
- Studio: Cacophony Recorders in Austin, Texas
- Genre: Singer-songwriter
- Length: 45:33
- Label: Anima Records (Anima 0051)
- Producer: Darwin Smith

Melissa Greener chronology
Fall from the Sky (2006)	Dwelling (2010)

Fall from the Sky is the debut album by American singer-songwriter Melissa Greener. It was produced by Darwin Smith at Cacophony Recorders in Austin, Texas and released on January 18, 2006.

Céline Keating of Acoustic Guitar magazine described it as "strikingly original and impressively varied", featuring "strong, catchy melodies in strange and brooding voicings". She said: "This may be her debut CD, but Melissa Greener is already a pro."

== Track listing ==
All tracks are written by Melissa Greener.

No.	Title	Length
1.	"Same Big Sky"	4:24
2.	"Cause/Effect"	3:44
3.	"Surrender"	3:14
4.	"Fall from the Sky"	5:42
5.	"Time to Go"	5:30
6.	"Wishes"	4:42
7.	"Long Road Down"	4:48
8.	"Fancy Free"	4:38
9.	"Forget It"	4:49
10.	"Year of the Horse"	4:02
