= Melissa Greener =

American singer-songwriter

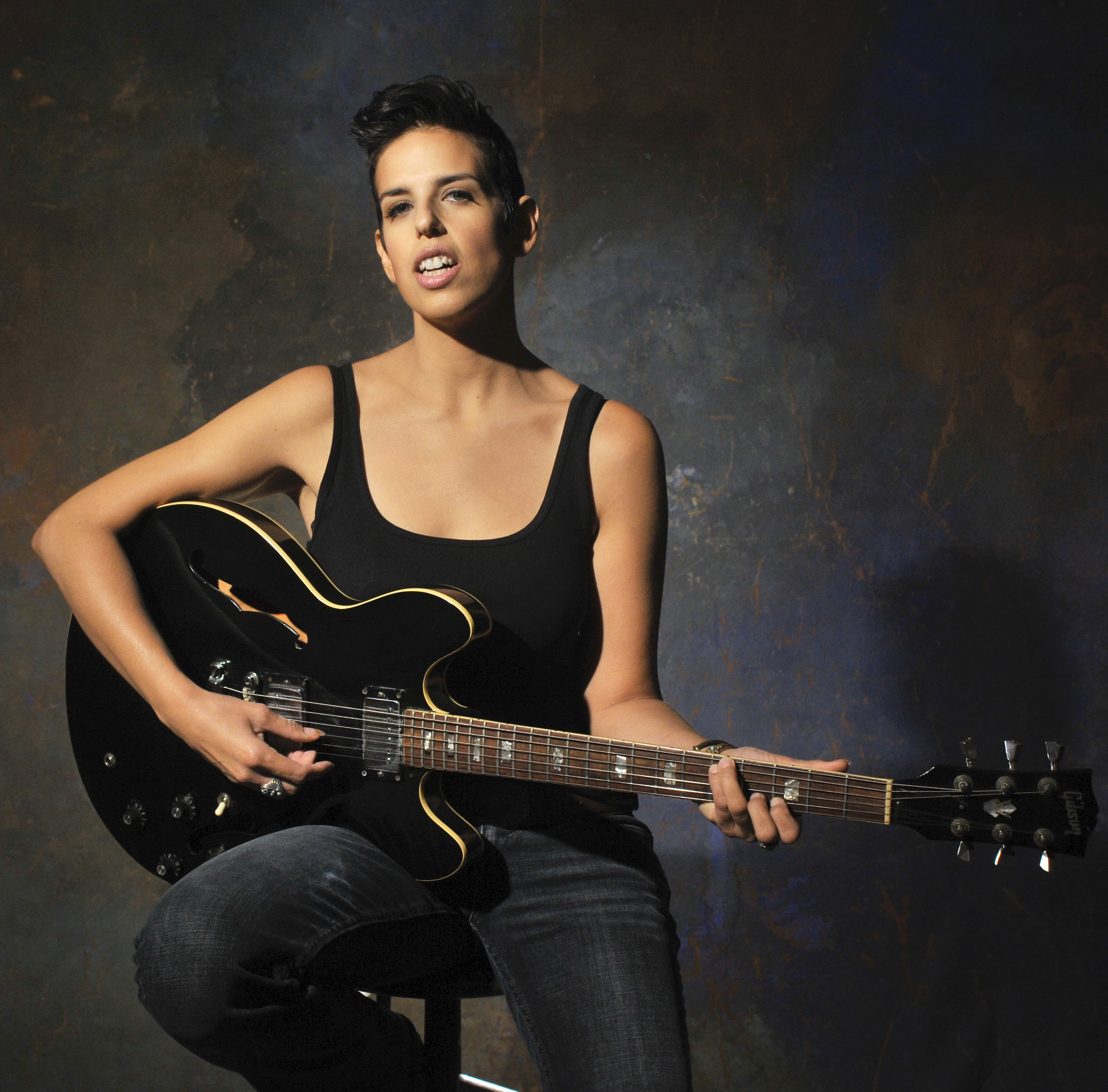

Background information
- Born: Detroit, Michigan, United States
- Genres: Folk, singer-songwriter
- Occupation(s): Folk singer, singer-songwriter
- Instrument(s): voice, guitar (Note: She plays a Greenfield guitar. Cohen, Mike (August 27, 2012). "Jewish guitar maker counts Keith Richards among his clients". Jewish Tribune. Archived from the original on July 14, 2014.)
- Years active: 2005–present
- Labels: Anima Records

Melissa Greener is an American singer-songwriter who describes herself as a folk crooner. She is based in Nashville, Tennessee. She has been described as a "sassy singer, virtuoso guitarist, beguiling songwriter and an imposing stage presence" with an "original blend of quirky lyrics and distinctive voice". Her third album, Transistor Corazón, received a 4.5-starred review in UK national newspaper The Daily Telegraph.

== Early life ==
Greener, the daughter of a classically trained soprano singer and a hippie father, was born and raised in Detroit, Michigan. She began playing guitar at the age of nine and was influenced by her childhood guitar teacher Billy Brandt and his heroes Stephen Stills, Neil Young and Gram Parsons.

After graduating from high school, Greener traveled to Tel Aviv and then to Montreal. She completed a Bachelor of Fine Arts degree in ceramics from the Nova Scotia College of Art and Design in Halifax, Nova Scotia and then taught in Jingdezhen, China, where she began writing songs for what would become her first album.

== Professional career ==
After Greener's contract in China finished, she returned to the United States to pursue a career of writing and performing her songs. Before moving to Nashville, Tennessee, she was based in Austin, Texas. She appeared (performing "Bullets to Bite") in episode 13 in series 1 of the television documentary Troubadour, TX, first aired on February 10, 2012.

=== Fall from the Sky ===
Greener's first album, Fall from the Sky, was released in January 2006. Céline Keating of Acoustic Guitar magazine described it as "strikingly original and impressively varied", featuring "strong, catchy melodies in strange and brooding voicings". She said: "This may be her debut CD, but Melissa Greener is already a pro."

=== Dwelling ===
Greener's second album, Dwelling, released in 2010, was produced by John Jennings, who has produced several albums for Mary Chapin Carpenter. One of the tracks on Dwelling, "Bullets to Bite", won first prize in the folk category of the 2009 USA Songwriting Competition.

=== Transistor Corazón ===
Greener's third album, Transistor Corazón, produced by Brad Jones, was released in 2013, and has been described as fusing "modernist poetry with soulful 1960s Laurel Canyon". According to Greener the album's name comes from the English/Spanish word "transistor", a device that amplifies, alters or changes the direction of an electrical signal, and from "corazon", the Spanish for "heart". The songs are about the themes of love and the complexity and short-circuitry of romantic intimacy. Greener co-wrote the album's title song with singer-songwriter David Rodriguez. In a 4.5-starred review, The Daily Telegraph's Culture Editor Online, Martin Chilton, described Transistor Corazón as an "album of depth" and her songwriting as "classy".

=== Solo – Electric ===
In 2015 she launched a crowdfunding campaign for the forthcoming release of a new album, Solo – Electric, a recording of a concert performed in Germany.

=== Other musical contributions ===
Greener sang harmony vocals on Buddy Mondlock's 2013 album The Memory Wall.

== Discography ==
Album	Release date	Label
Fall from the Sky	January 18, 2006	Anima Records (ANIMA 0051)
Dwelling	January 12, 2010	Anima Records (ANIMA 0102)
Transistor Corazón	June 14, 2013	Anima Records (ANIMA 0133)
