= The Real Nasty =

- Origin: Oakland, California, United States
- Genres: Rock, Country
- Years active: 2009-present
- Labels: Ninth Street Opus
- Members: Ryan Lukas (Upright Bass Vox), Sean Williams (Electric guitar, Vox), Brian Huston (Drums)
- Past members: Matthew "Smitty" Smith (Drums), Jacob Groopman (Electric guitar)
- Website: www.therealnasty.com

The Real Nasty is a Berkeley, California country/rock music-based band. The band's members are Ryan Lukas (the main songwriter, lead vocals, upright bass), Sean Williams (electric guitar) and Brian Huston (percussion). The music has been described as "countrified rock", and draws from a range of musical genres including bluegrass, world music, and country music.

In 2009, The Real Nasty was signed to Ninth Street Opus, an independent record label out of Berkeley, CA. They immediately released Paper City, a double disk album. The disks were EP's unto themselves as they each had their own title and genre. The Sticks contained country while Downtown was rock-based. In October 2010, the follow-up to Paper City was released. Strangers and Friends was described as compelling fusion of countrified rock. October 2011 saw the release of their third studio album, Dirty Dollars, which incorporates elements of rock, country, blues, funk, and soul.

== History ==
The Real Nasty was formed in Berkeley, California, in 2009. Groopman and Smith were also part of the San Francisco-based Afrobeat band, ALBINO!. Lukas later joined Groopman and Smith to form The Real Nasty. Within one year, they were signed by Ninth Street Opus.

== Band members ==
Ryan Lukas attended the Crane School of Music and has played bass professionally since 1996. His involvement in other projects include Persephone’s Bees, Alex Torres and His Latin Orchestra and the Brian Patneaude Quartet. Ryan also teaches bass at the Santa Clara University.

Brian Huston began playing orchestral drums at age 11, started gigging in rock bands at age 16, and went on to earn his B.A. from Berklee College of Music in 2001, where he specialized in Funk/Jazz, Afro-Cuban, Brazilian, and West African music.

Matthew "Smitty" Smith is a former member of ALBINO! and a student of West African master drummer CK Ladzepko. He was the original drummer, but now works as the band manager.

== Albums ==
- 2009 - Paper City, a double disc EP (Ninth Street Opus)
- 2010 - Strangers and Friends (Ninth Street Opus)
- 2011 - Dirty Dollars (Ninth Street Opus)

== Singles ==
- "KC’s Blues" (Paper City)
- "Bad Medicine" (Paper City)
- "No Big Deal" (Strangers and Friends)
- "Whiskey for Breakfast" (Strangers and Friends)
- "Jezebelle" (Strangers and Friends)
- "Dirty Dollars" (Dirty Dollars)
