= The Rondo Brothers =

American production duo and trip-hop artist

Rondo Brothers
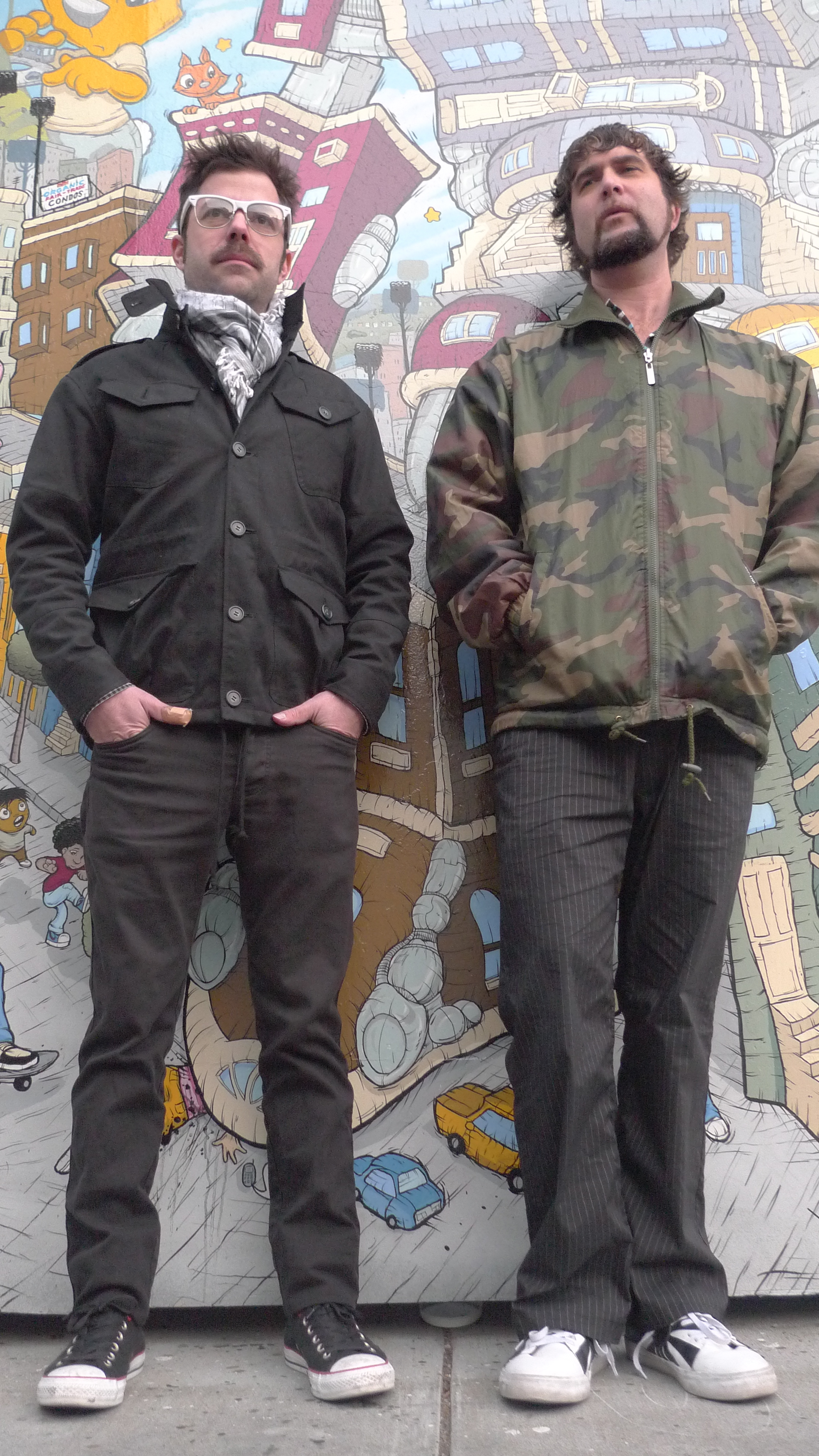
- Brandon Arnovick and Jim Greer

Background information
- Origin: San Francisco, California
- Genres: Hip hop, Alternative, Trip hop
- Labels: War Chant (US), Jet Set (Japan)
- Members: "Diamond Jim" (Jim Greer), "The Bastard Prince" (Brandon Arnovick)
- Website: Rondo Brothers

The Rondo Brothers are a musical duo from San Francisco, United States, consisting of multi-instrumentalists and producers Diamond Jim (Jim Greer) and The Bastard Prince (Brandon Arnovick). They met in 1998 when Jim was working as a talent buyer at legendary SF music venue the Paradise Lounge, but did not collaborate on music until 2003 when they scored a series of NFL commercials and began a 10 year journey as performing artists, remixers, producers, DJs, multi-instrumentalists, and more.

== Origins ==
Greer (primarily keyboards, bass guitar, rhythm guitar, drum programming) and Arnovick (primarily lead guitar, drum programming) worked together at a San Francisco nightclub called the Paradise Lounge. They began their careers as musicians on various projects by Dan the Automator. Greer also played keyboards for the original Dr. Octagon live band, and Arnovick played guitar with Deltron 3030 and Lovage, as well as accompanying the groups on US tours. While working for Dan the Automator, Greer also worked as a producer and founded a record label. His first major production was the debut album by art-rock group The Gun & Doll Show, recorded in Petaluma, California. Greer also wrote songs with RCA / Or Music (Matisyahu, Los Lonely Boys) artist, essence, and worked as a session player for producer Bill Bottrell.

The pair formed The Rondo Brothers in 2003 during the recording of New Orleans jam band Galactic's album, Ruckus, which they helped produce. They were asked to join Warner Brothers act Head Automatica, and subsequently toured the United States with acts including The Rapture, Interpol, Thursday and The Cure. They remained on tour with Head Automatica for nearly two years, during which period they were also working as producers and remixers, with work for film and television as well as remixes of songs like Patti Page's "Frosty The Snowman", Bob James' "Nautilus", and the song "We're Not Alone" by Mike Patton's project Peeping Tom. They also recorded their first full-length album, No Time Left On Earth, featuring guest appearances from Daryl Palumbo, Kelly Atkins of 20 Minute Loop & Kitka, Vinnie Caruana, Samantha Stollenwerck, Pedro Shanahan, and Tim Carter.

== Career ==
Released on September 7, 2004, No Time Left On Earth contained the college hit "Hey Stewardess", featuring Daryl Palumbo and Samantha Stollenwerck. The Rondo Brothers also played on the album White People by Handsome Boy Modeling School, and joined the band on their month-long US tour and several shows at the Jazz Cafe in London, where they also performed with Jamie Cullum. Meanwhile, No Time Left On Earth was released in Japan on JetSet Records, along with two special edition 12" records.

During this time the Rondo Brothers helped produce The Matches and MC Lars track "Hot Topic is Not Punk Rock", and issued remixes of artists including Charlie Parker, Billie Holiday, Rosemary Clooney, and Dean Martin. In 2006, the Rondo Brothers worked with Bay Area beat boxer Kid Beyond, and made a remix for the band Vinyl featuring keyboardist Bernie Worrell. They also worked for commercial clients including John Frieda, Banana Republic, the NFL and Dodge. They began working with producer Jack Douglas and remixed a New York Dolls song from their Douglas-produced album One Day It Will Please Us to Remember Even This. They also worked with other Bay Area artists such as The Lovemakers, Scissors for Lefty, and Loquat.

In 2007 the Rondo Brothers released their second album Seven Minutes to Midnight, and went on a second US tour, performing with Chali2NA, André the Giant, and Casual from Hieroglyphics, while backing Dan the Automator on the score for an NBA video game. They also produced remixes for artists such as Common, Shwayze, and MC Lars. The same year they worked on the Cuba Gooding Jr. and Michael Jordan commercial spots for Hanes, and also appeared on the soundtrack for the hit documentary My Kid Could Paint That. Later that year they produced their first full-length film score, for Lonely Street.

In 2008 they co-produced (with Les Claypool) the album Fogshack Music Volume Two by Vinyl, produced tracks for MC Lars album This Gigantic Robot Kills, and contributed production to YT Cracker's album The Digital Gangster. Southern artist Eric Lindell included a song co-written by the Rondo Brothers on his 2008 album Gulf Coast Highway, and they released, with Sony Music, a library version of their album Seven Minutes To Midnight, distributed for producers and DJs.

In 2009 the Rondo Brothers won a remix contest organized by Yoko Ono, who selected their remix of her song "The Sun Is Down" to post on her website, and Greer produced Cyndi Harvell, an artist he discovered through Jack Douglas, also accompanying her on bass at the Hardly Strictly Bluegrass festival. Around this time the Rondo Brothers also contributed production to the album The Upside by The Kin, a band with whom they also began a side project called "Rondo Sessions". In 2009 and 2010 the Rondo Brothers recorded over 40 songs with The Kin.

In 2010 they released their third album The Foreign Globester, a concept album with MC Lars, Motion Man, K.Flay and Beefy. The album was released through Oglio Records and was featured on the cover of the East Bay Express, an Oakland weekly.

2010 saw the Rondo Brothers co-write the song "Heart of Steel" with the band Galactic, which was named by National Public Radio as a top single and included by The New York Times as one of the "Top ten best songs of 2010". The song was featured in the TV show True Blood. Around this time the Rondo Brothers' live drummer Tim Carter also worked on an album by British band Kasabian. The Rondo-produced track by Foster the People, "Chin Music For The Unsuspecting Hero", was included on their smash hit single "Pumped Up Kicks".

In 2011, the Rondo Brothers worked with folk artists Sarah Lee Guthrie & Johnny Irion, and did several further remixes for Foster The People. With the advent of streaming services, their song "pineapple wine" that had been featured in an Ice Cube movie started to see popularity online, as well as their remix of Frosty The Snowman by Patti Page, that gained popularity due to being included in many fashion stores and holiday playlists.

In 2012 they recorded the album Proper Cowboy for Bay Area band Diego's Umbrella, and collaborated with Angelo Moore of Los Angeles ska band Fishbone for the single "Brand New Step".

After 2013 the Rondo Brothers went on hiatus largely due to the circumstances with Jim Greer's son Teddy, who was diagnosed with a rare form of pediatric cancer and died in 2012. Jim Greer moved his studio operation from the Rondo Brothers HQ in San Francisco to a new studio in Berkeley, called Ninth Street Opus.

As Jim slowly regained his footing producing and making a living, the Rondo Brothers released a few singles and a fourth album in 2016 called "Shadow Government" largely made of A list tracks the Rondos had not had room for on previous recordings. A mixtape of covers they recorded with various artists over the years called "escape the arcade" was then released in 2019.

Jim worked on his own with Galactic more, writing and recording "Into the Deep" with Macy Gray and David Shaw of the Revivalists, which has garnered around 20 million streams on Spotify and is Galactic' most successful single to date.

In 2021 a Rondo Brothers co-write with Galactic called "Bittersweet" was in an episode of the show Billions with Paul Giamiatti.

Jim has kept the Rondo brother spirit as he continues to produce and write full time, landing collaborations with Big Freedia in 2023, Del The Funky Homosapien, Angelo Moore, and more, as well as producing tons of artists around the Bay Area and in Los Angeles.

In 2024 the Rondos are releasing a collection of quirky, trip hop oriented dance and electronic tracks called "Vanish Mode", re-mixed and mastered from the Rondos extensive library.
