= Blame Sally =

American musical group

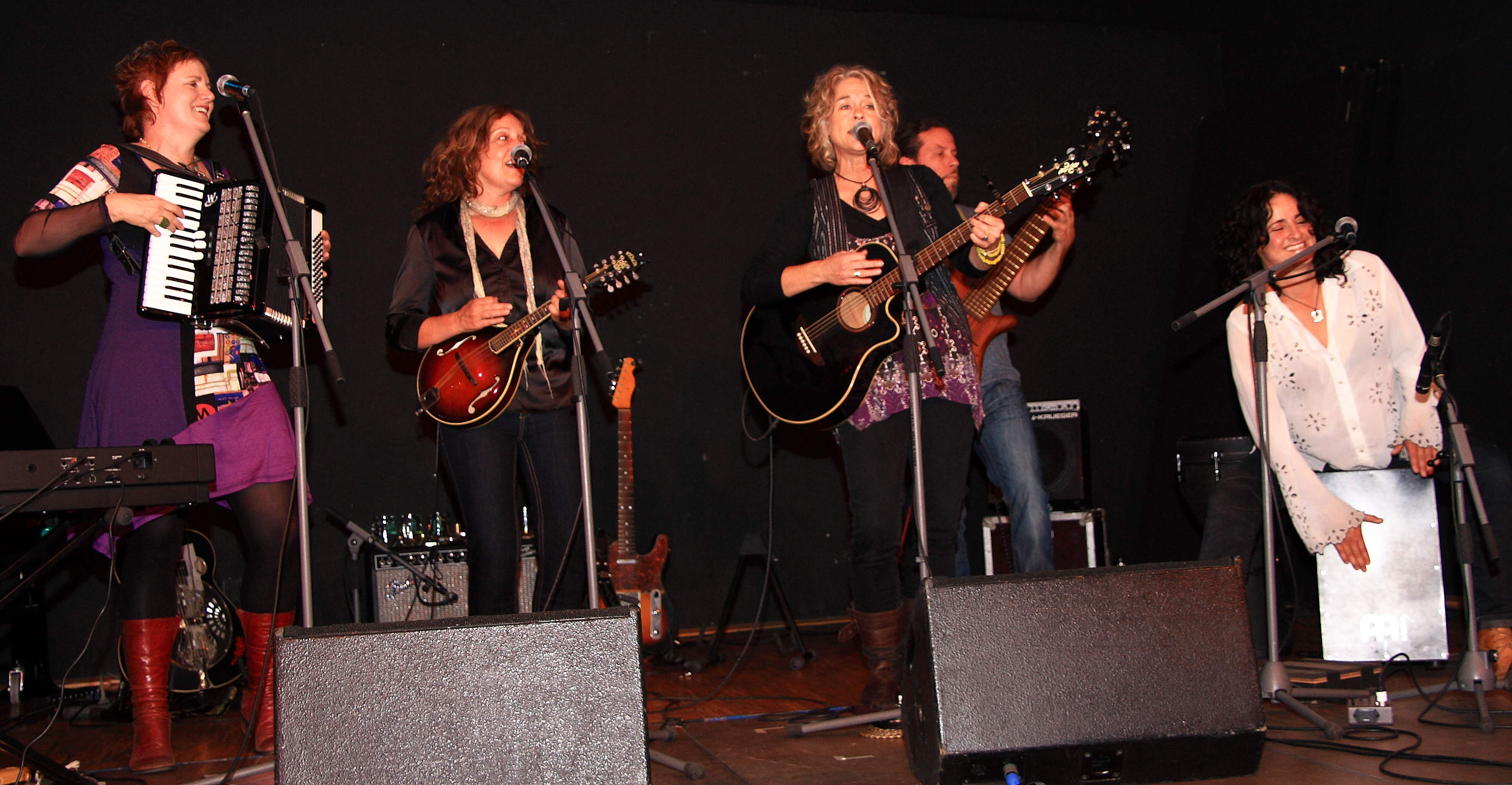
- First German tour at Kult, Niederstetten, 2010

Background information
- Origin: San Francisco
- Years active: 2000–present
- Label: Ninth Street Opus
- Members: Pam Delgado; Renee Harcourt; Jeri Jones; Monica Pasqual; Rob Strom
- Website: www.blamesally.com

Blame Sally is a collaboration of four solo female singer-songwriters from San Francisco, United States, who have recorded and performed together frequently over the past decade. The members of the group include Pam Delgado (percussion and vocals), Renee Harcourt (guitar and vocals), Rob Strom (bass guitar), Jeri Jones (guitar, bass and vocals), and Monica Pasqual (piano, accordion, and vocals).

The group was formed in 2000, and in 2001, KFOG "began playing the band's music on the popular 'Acoustic Sunrise' show, leading to more gigs and bigger venues"; the band "got national attention through XM Radio" and "by the end of 2006, the band was playing more than 50 shows a year."

Allmusic praises their 2007 album, Severland as "the first on which they sound more like a proper band than four solo artists working collectively," and gives it a rating of 4.5 stars. As of 2009, the band was signed for a three-album, five-year contract worth a half-million dollars. In 2010, Blame Sally released Live at Stern Grove Festival, recorded at San Francisco's Stern Grove Festival in 2009 on a date that was headlined by the legendary Joan Baez.

Also in 2010, Germany saw its first taste of Blame Sally with a 15 date tour across the country. The band played in myriad venues from inns to The House of Blues. In summer 2012, Blame Sally toured Germany for the second time, also visiting neighboring countries such as Italy and Switzerland with support from their record label Ninth Street Opus. The band played in venues from cafes to clubs such as TECnet during the month-long tour.

In October 2012, Blame Sally made its first appearance across the United Kingdom during their two-week tour. The group also participated in an interview with the Sally Naden Show in BBC Radio Lancashire.

In September 2022, Blame Sally performed two "Farewell For Now" concerts at The Freight and Salvage in Berkeley, California.

== Discography ==
- Live No. 1 (2001 self-release)
- Blame Sally (2004 self-release)
- Severland (2007 Dig)
- Night of 1000 Stars (2009 Ninth Street Opus)
- Live at Stern Grove (2010 Ninth Street Opus)
- Speeding Ticket and A Valentine (2011 Ninth Street Opus)
- Live at KVIE Studios, Vol. 1 (2012 Ninth Street Opus)

== See also ==
- Corinne West, Northern California-based singer-songwriter who began collaborating in 2013 with Pam Delgado and Jeri Jones
