= Troubadour, TX =

- Genre: Reality
- Country of origin: United States
- Original language: English
- No. of seasons: 1
- No. of episodes: 22

Production
- Production location: Texas
- Running time: 60 minutes
- Production companies: 41 Entertainment; London Broadcasting

Original release
- Release: September 24, 2011

Troubadour, TX is a nationally syndicated American documentary television series following various singers and songwriters across Texas. The series features behind the scenes looks into the lives of the various artists, known as "Troubadours", as they encounter both professional and personal challenges. The series attempts to take a naturalistic approach with minimal editing to provide a more honest look into the life of singers and songwriters.

== Production and broadcast history ==
Casting for the series began in April 2011 with talent searches in numerous cities across Texas. Troubadour, TX premiered on September 24, 2011 on 140 stations across the United States. The series is primarily filmed in Texas and is narrated by American country singer-songwriter Stacy Dean Campbell. Many of the episodes feature "showcase performances" from selected Troubadours, recorded at Studio 41E. The series is produced by Dallas-based London Broadcasting and 41 Entertainment. The first season concluded on May 26, 2012 with a second season being announced during the finale.

== Episodes ==
No.	Title	Showcase Performances	Original release date
1	"Premiere"	TBA	September 23, 2011
The premiere introduces the troubadours, the singer/songwriters that the series follows as it explores the challenges and the rewards of trying to make it as a performer. The various troubadours discuss the passions that have led them to perform and where they expect the journey to take them. Industry experts are also interviewed and share their thoughts on how to make it in the music industry.
2	"Dallas Troubadours"	Zane Williams ("99 Bottles")	September 30, 2011
Kylie Rae Harris talks about what inspires her creative process and performs "Deepest Scar". TJ Broscoff talks about how he has put his demons behind him by focusing on his music.
3	"Meet Austin"	TBA	October 7, 2011
Kylie Rae Harris suffers transportation issues making it to a performance. Michael Martin Murphey talks about the history of the troubadour lifestyle and how it intrigued him. Cary Pierce juggles performing at a wedding and making it to his own gig.
4	"The Garage Sale"	Trevino (“Better Here in Texas”), Blacktop Gypsy (“Ain’t Your Mama”)	October 14, 2011
Singer-songwriter Little Brave, who is continuing to make career strides with her music shares where she’s heading to, and what she’s having to do to get there. She also discusses her thoughts on what it means being a female in “the music business.” Troubadour Rick Trevino is trying to carefully balance his family and his music career. Beth Wood performs in two totally different venues demonstrating the versatility of being a Troubadour. Zane Williams refines his skills on the guitar while Woody Russell spends some time with his family.
5	"Managing Time"	Kirk Thurmond, Cary Pierce	October 21, 2011
Kylie Rae Harris heads to historic Gruene, Texas to perform live. Zane Williams confronts his business strategy and family issues which arise from being a troubadour. Kirk Thurmond reveals his love interest and has a concert appearance interrupted by tornado warnings. Cary Pierce and Cary Cooper also feature in behind the scenes footage.
6	"Kerrville"	Cary Cooper, Ryan Edgar	October 28, 2011
This episode travels to the Kerrville Folk Festival to visit with Nicolette Good, Tom Prasada Rao and others. Stacy Dean Campbell shares a sneak peek at his new recording project. Multiple Dove award winner, Susan Ashton is featured as well as additional behind-the-scenes moments with Ryan Edgar.
7	"A Song's Birth"	Kylie Rae Harris, Guthrie Kennard	November 4, 2011
Kylie Rae Harris has a productive songwriter session with two Grammy award-winning artists. Nicolette Good meets with artist management about the direction of her career. Tyler Hammond juggles his day job as a guitar salesman and night gigs as a performer.
8	"Nudie Suits"	Susan Ashton, Green River Ordinance	November 11, 2011
The episode begins with a behind the scenes visit with Susan Ashton at her home in Nashville and at a songwriting session with award-winning songwriters and producers Gordon Kennedy and Wayne Kirkpatrick. Guthrie Kennard talks about the difficult sacrifices he has made to pursue his music career. Beth Wood shares how to make a national tour schedule work from her home in Oregon.
9	"Premiere Concert"	None	November 18, 2011
This episode features live performances from the Premiere Concert event from the launch of the series. With looks at the trobadours backstage preparations and all the action from the red carpet.
10	"Obstacles"	Stephanie Urbina Jones (“I’m Not A Piñata”), Green River Ordinance (“On Your Own”)	January 20, 2012
Green River Ordinance go through a day of songwriting, rehearsal and a performance in Dallas, Texas and make a surprising choice about their record deal. TJ Broscoff and his band are in Corsicana, Texas, where the challenges of being a musician and road manager become evident. Stephanie Urbina Jones goes to Fredericksburg, Texas, where she performs with her band. She also attends the premiere of Texas indie film, "Courage," in which she has a starring role.
11	"Stress"	Ryan Edgar (“I’ve Got Time”), Kylie Rae Harris (“Change”)	January 27, 2012
Kylie Rae Harris takes some important steps in her artist development, from a trip to Nashville where she meets with writing and production team Sorted Noise, to a songwriting session with music greats Wayne Kirkpatrick and Gordon Kennedy. Ryan Edgar works through the process of building his new website with a web development specialist in Nashville, Tenn. The episode then visits with Tyler Hammond at the venue where he first met his wife and checks in with them at the hospital as they become new parents. Tyler also performs a special song inspired by the death of his mother when he was a teenager. Little Brave searches for a unique instrument and finds inspiration for a new song in the process.
12	"Pressure"	Chacho and Brance, Rick Trevino	February 3, 2012
Cary Pierce performs with his band Jackopierce in Dallas, Texas and Sonoma, California. Cary meets with music industry expert Michael Blanton to pitch some new material. After listening in Cary’s studio, Blanton critiques the songs and lets Cary know what he thinks. San Antonio artists Chacho and Brance, whose music is often described as “Soul Folk” share what inspires their songwriting on the eve of their first CD release. Grammy-winning artist Rick Trevino works on a new song at home and shares how his priorities have changed since becoming a dad. Woody Russell gets some unexpected career advice from BE Music President Michael Blanton. Woody takes the stage in Austin and then hits Guitar Center, where he discovers some vintage guitars.
13	"Showcases I"	Numerous	February 10, 2012
This episode is a special night of showcase performances at the 41E Studio Cafe with music from nine of the Troubadours. Showcase performances include: Woody Russell performing “Make It Tough On Me”, Melissa Greener performing “Bullets To Bite”, Guthrie Kennard with violinist Marion Brackney performing “Hobo Traveller”, Kirk Thurmond performing “Believable”, Cary Cooper performing “Jimmy Stewart”, Chacho and Brance performing “Libertine Lane”, Susan Ashton performing “Thief” with Wayne Kirkpatrick and Gordon Kennedy, Gary Floyd performing “Crystal” and Tom Faulkner performing “Do Bea’s Dance”.
14	"The Makeover"	Tom Faulkner (“Angelina”), Kylie Rae Harris (“Sticks and Stones”)	February 17, 2012
Tom Faulkner, who has written some of the most successful jingles of our time talks about being a performer and why writing jingles wasn’t originally something he wanted to do. Ryan Edgar rehearses at home for his next gig at Gilley’s in Dallas and shares what inspired him to write one of his newest songs. Ellis, a Troubadour who brings a unique mix of storytelling and humor to the stage performs at a popular listening room in Dallas and meets with fans. Kylie Rae Harris is in Nashville for a photo shoot and a new look and makeover.
15	"Changing Plans"	Tom Prasada Rao (“Sleeping Beauty”), Phoenix Hart (“Angels”)	February 24, 2012
Zane Williams spends time with artist Drew Womack, who is opening for the Oak Ridge Boys in Allen, Texas, and takes time to talk to Zane about the adjustments he’s made in order to juggle family life while touring full-time. Drew talks about his career as a writer and performer and then performs one of his hit songs on stage. Tom Prasada Rao works hard in the studio as a writer and producer and then performs with his bandmates from The Sherpas. Phoenix Hart shares where she finds the inspiration behind her songwriting.
16	"TX Icons"	Numerous	March 2, 2012
Episode 16 is a special showcase performance episode of Troubadour, TX, featuring some legendary Texas artists as they perform solo and with fellow Troubadours. Ray Wylie Hubbard takes the stage with Guthrie Kennard. Walt Wilkins performs with Kylie Rae Harris. Michael Martin Murphey sings with Woody Russell. Billy Crockett is joined on stage by Beth Wood. Jack Ingram performs with Troubadour Cary Pierce. Also, an appearance from Ryan Edgar as he reveals how another Texas music great, Stevie Ray Vaughan, influenced his music.
17	"The Dark Side"	Walt Wilkins ("Trains I Missed")	April 16, 2012
Kylie Rae Harris is in Nashville as she meets with her wardrobe consultant and gets some pointers on how to dress like a star. Later, Kylie and her management team confront the issues regarding alcohol and its implications on an artist’s career. Zane Williams gets career advice in Abilene, Texas from Country music star Aaron Watson. Later, Zane takes the stage in Austin alongside some of the best songwriters in the business. Zane wows the sold-out crowd with a performance of “Overnight Success.” Also, Troubadour TJ Broscoff shares a personal story about his battle with substance abuse that almost cost him his life.
18	"Common Grounds"	Jon Christopher Davis ("You Gotta Love Someone")	April 23, 2012
The show travels to Waco, TX as five Troubadours take the stage, including Kylie Rae Harris (performing “Waited”), Woody Russell (performing “We May Never Know”), Little Brave (performing “Fact or Fiction”), Ryan Edgar (performing “Wherever You Are”) and Zane Williams (performing “Ride With Me”). The Trishas explain how their hit band started, the challenges of balancing motherhood while touring, and the funny story about how they came up with their name. The Trishas then perform “Mother of Invention”. Jon Christopher Davis performs at the Dallas Cowboys’ stadium and explains how he turned an idea for a t-shirt into an entire brand.
19	"Showcases II"	Numerous	April 30, 2012
This episode features a special night of showcase performances from the 41E Studio Cafe with 10 of the show’s Troubadours. Cary Pierce is joined by Jack Ingram performing “Let Go Of Me,” Phoenix Hart sings “Shine A Light,” and Woody Russell shares the stage with Michael Martin Murphey and harmonica player Jose Ruiz for “Short Trip.” Nicolette Good sings “Son of My Sister,” Jack Ingram takes the stage performing “Right for You,” and Brice Beaird sings “Same Kind As You.” Stephanie Urbina Jones performs “Besema Mucho,” Beth Wood sings “Coyote Prayer,” Max Stalling performs his hit song “I Ain’t Drinkin Alone,” and Michael Martin Murphey closes out the show from Saxon Pub with his mega hit, “Cosmic Cowboy.”
20	"Tough Times"	Jack Ingram ("Biloxi") Ray Wylie Hubbard ("Rabbit"), Melsisa Greener ("Jackson"), Gary Lynn Floyd ("Unbound")	May 7, 2012
Jack Ingram shares the inspiration behind his song “Biloxi” and performs the hit tune in a 41E showcase performance. The episode then visits Little Brave in Austin, where the singer performs at a unique venue. Melissa Greener is at Blue Rock Studios in Wimberley, Texas. She shares her personal struggle to kick drugs and alcohol and explains how it has affected her music career. Greener also performs “Jackson” in a showcase performance. Gary Lynn Floyd, who has gone from the top of the Christian music charts to creating songs that lean more towards a Pop and Soul sound performs the song “Unbound.”
21	"Wishing Big"	Billy Crockett (“Ticking of Her Heart”), Beth Wood (“The New Kid”) and Rohn Bailey (“Life Cafe”)	May 14, 2012
Troubadour, TX hits the road with Green River Ordinance to see how they transition from rehearsal to taking the stage. Zane Williams, BlacktopGYPSY, TJ Broscoff, and Kylie Rae Harris are at the Texas Regional Radio and Music Awards. Beth Wood takes her career to the next step and then the episode focuses on Max Stalling in Luckenbach, TX.
22	"Season 1 Finale Concert"	None	May 21, 2012
Ten TTX artists perform live at an outdoor stage in Addison, TX to a crowd of nearly 2,000 people in the finale concert for season one of the show. The season one finale focuses on the live concert and behind-the-scenes moments of the entire process – from live radio interviews promoting the concert, to sound checks and artists backstage. Taking the stage for the finale concert are Zane Williams, Beth Wood, Woody Russell, Susan Ashton, Cary Pierce, Guthrie Kennard, Kylie Rae Harris, Tom Faulkner, Little Brave and Nicolette Good. There are also special performances with Ray Wylie Hubbard and Jack Ingram. Troubadour, TX host Stacy Dean Campbell closes the episode with a look ahead to season two of the series.
