= David Rodriguez (singer-songwriter) =

American singer-songwriter (1952–2015)

David Roland Rodriguez (January 1, 1952 – October 26, 2015) was an American folk music singer-songwriter, performer and poet.

== Life and music ==
David Roland Rodriguez was born and raised in Houston, Texas. His paternal roots lay in Mexico, and his mother's older sister, Eva Garza, recorded for Decca Records during the 1950s. At the age of two he contracted polio and as a result Rodriguez wore a leg brace and walked with a cane for the rest of his life. Because his mobility was restricted his parents bought him a guitar. By the age of fourteen David was playing in a rock band, a year later in a folk group, and by the close of his teens was the pianist in an avant-garde ensemble.

His early musical influences included Lightnin' Hopkins, Townes Van Zandt, Lydia Mendoza, and Jerry Jeff Walker. By his early twenties, David was a law and economics graduate, based in Austin, Texas, where he spent well over the next decade playing music in Texas listening rooms, practicing law and, in 1990, running for elected public office.

In 1992, 1993 and 1994, Rodriguez was voted the best Texas songwriter in an Austin poll by the music magazine, Third Coast Music. His song "The Ballad Of The Snow Leopard And The Tanqueray Cowboy" was recorded by country singer-songwriter Lyle Lovett for his 1998 album Step Inside This House, and by folk artist Melissa Greener for her 2010 album, Dwelling.

In 1994, Rodriguez decided to settle in The Netherlands where he remained until his death in 2015. On some concerts, he has been accompanied by his daughter Carrie Rodriguez on fiddle.

== Political career ==
Rodriguez's musical aspirations underwent an eight-year hiatus that began in 1979 when he moved to Austin to pursue a profession in the legal field. In 1981, David graduated from law school at The University of Texas, Austin. As a law student he excelled academically, and his hard work earned him a coveted spot on the Texas Law Review. After graduation David was hired by McGinnis, Lochridge, and Kilgore, one of Austin's largest and most influential law firms at that time. For the next few years he worked as a criminal lawyer in Austin, while never abandoning his activist roots or his musical community. Whenever he could, David continued to do legal work for both street-poor Mexican immigrants as well as his fellow artists and musicians. In 1990, David became chairman of the City of Austin Arts Commission.

In 1990, Rodriguez ran for District 51 state representative on a platform of crime reform, environmental preservation, insurance reform, and increased opportunities for equality in education. The Democratic party did not expect Rodriguez to perform exceptionally well at the polls due to the generally liberal nature of his politics. But he already had name recognition through his work in the arts, and this gave him an edge over his opponent, Glen Maxey. During the tail end of the campaign there was a small controversy over whether or not Rodriguez was a legal resident of the district. After a close race, Rodriguez lost in a run-off. After this defeat, David decided to sever ties with his legal practice for good and dedicate the rest of his life to music.

== Discography ==
| Year | Title | Label | Number | Notes |
|---|---|---|---|---|
| 1990 | Man Against Beast | no label (US) | | 15-song cassette, recorded live May 31, 1990, at Chicago House in Austin, Texas |
| 1992 | Avatars, Angels and Ashes | no label (US) | | 11-song cassette, recorded live September 1991 at Anderson Fair in Houston, Texas |
| 1992 | The True Cross | Dejadisc (US) | 3202 | CD reissue of Man Against Beast plus a live duet with Lucinda Williams recorded July 1992 |
| 1992 | Landing 92 | Brambus (Switzerland) | | CD reissue of ten tracks from Man Against Beast and seven tracks from Avatars, Angels And Ashes |
| 1994 | The Friedens Angel | Brambus (Switzerland) | | ten studio tracks + four live tracks recorded May 1993 |
| 1994 | Forgiveness | World Records (US) | | cassette |
| 1995 | Proud Heart | Continental Song City (Netherlands) | 1002 | released in the US as Recovery Recordings 2682 (2006) |
| 2006 | The Lonesome Drover | Noose (Netherlands) | N101 | 8 studio tracks, reissued on Folkwit Records (download only) |
| 2007 | Winter Moon | Folkwit (UK) | 0016 | recorded live in Dordrecht, The Netherlands |
| 2011 | Racing Aimless | Waving Fish Music | | Recorded in parlours around the globe |
