= Ninth Street Opus =

Record label

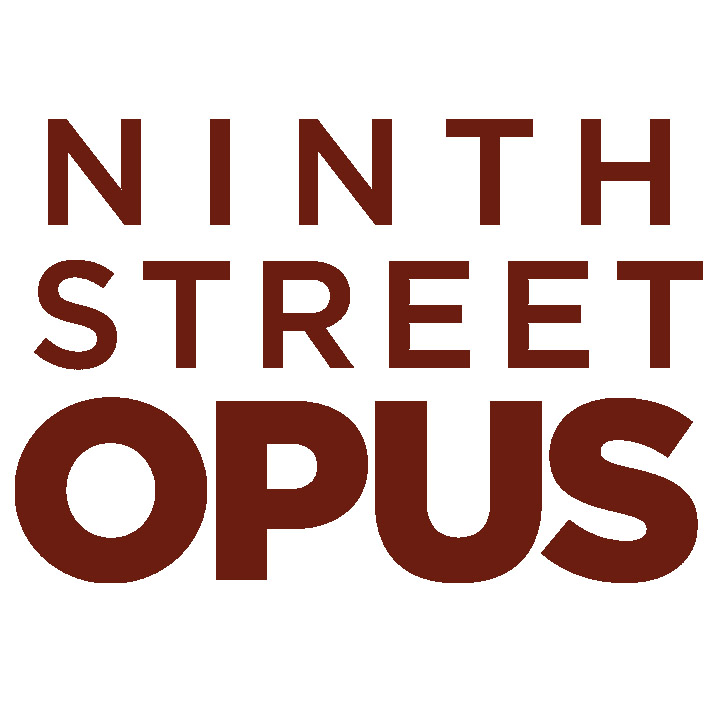
- Founded: 2008
- Founder: Wayne Skeen
- Genre: Alternative, Americana, country, folk, hip hop, indie, pop, rock
- Country of origin: U.S.
- Location: Berkeley, California
- Official website: www.ninthstreetopus.com

Ninth Street Opus is an independent record label in Berkeley, California. Founded in 2008 by producer Wayne Skeen, Opus is a genre-agnostic label, with recordings that focus on artists with strong live musical performances. Their catalog’s recordings have dipped into folk, country, rock, jazz and alternative rock music genres. Opus offers management, tour support, Internet and traditional marketing and promotion, long term career and fan building and publishing.

== Artists ==
The artist roster has seen steady growth since the label's start (see complete discography). The first band to sign on to Ninth Street Opus in 2008 was Blame Sally. Their first album with the label, Night of 1000 Stars, was released in May 2009. Shortly thereafter, Opus released Carrie Rodriguez’ Love and Circumstance which remained in the top three on Billboard's Americana Charts for over six weeks. In the winter of 2010, Opus released Sarah Lee Guthrie & Johnny Irion's album Bright Examples, produced by Andy Cabic and Thom Mohanan of Vetiver and includes artists such as Gary Louris and Mark Olson of The Jayhawks.

Along with long term “label artists”, Opus also works on projects on an individual basis. These projects have included recordings with young artists looking for a professional album to tour with, side projects of signed artists and longer termed series projects with various artists.

== Studio ==
Opus Studios, also located in the Ocean View district of West Berkeley, has a 48 channel mixer and a plethora of instruments including a grand piano, vintage mics, a Hammond B3 and harmonium available for recording artists to use. The studio includes a glass vocal booth, control room and large tracking room so full bands can record together live.

Chief engineer/studio manager is Dave Luke.

Along with founder, Wayne Skeen, in-house producers include San Francisco duo, The Rondo Brothers. The Rondo Brothers, Jim Greer and Brandon Arnovick, formally joined the Opus team after producing the first recordings of Rondo Sessions with The Kin.

== Artist roster ==
- Blame Sally
- Carrie Rodriguez
- Cyndi Harvell
- Diego's Umbrella
- Forrest Day
- Greylag
- The Real Nasty
- Rondo Brothers
- The Roseline
- Sarah Lee Guthrie and Johnny Irion

== Opus Project Series ==
- Annie Bacon & her OSHEN
- Felsen
- The Pam and Jeri Show
- U.S. Elevator
- Angelo Moore

== Discography ==
| Year | Title | Artist |
|---|---|---|
| 2009 | Night of 1000 Stars | Blame Sally |
| 2009 | Corner of the World | Luce |
| 2009 | Paper City | The Real Nasty |
| 2009 | There is No Reason Here (There is only a persistent feeling that we ought to look closely and love deeply | Annie Bacon & her OSHEN |
| 2009 | The Pam and Jeri Show | The Pam and Jeri Show |
| 2010 | The Year We’ll Have | Luce |
| 2010 | Love and Circumstance | Carrie Rodriguez |
| 2010 | Felsen Loves You | Felsen |
| 2010 | Live at Stern Grove Festival | Blame Sally |
| 2010 | From the Echo | Cyndi Harvell |
| 2010 | Bright Examples (EP) | Sarah Lee Guthrie & Johnny Irion |
| 2010 | The Kin Rondo Sessions EP (US) | The Kin |
| 2010 | The Kin Rondo Sessions EP (UK) | The Kin |
| 2010 | The Kin Rondo Sessions EP (Japan) | The Kin |
| 2010 | Strangers and Friends | The Real Nasty |
| 2011 | We Still Love Our Country | Carrie Rodriguez and Ben Kyle |
| 2011 | Bright Examples- (full length LP) | Sarah Lee Guthrie & Johnny Irion |
| 2011 | Richardson EP | Diego's Umbrella |
| 2011 | Forrest Day | Forrest Day |
| 2011 | Speeding Ticket and a Valentine | Blame Sally |
| 2011 | Dirty Dollars | The Real Nasty |
| 2012 | U.S. Elevator EP | U.S. Elevator |
| 2012 | The Only Way to Kill You EP | Greylag |
| 2012 | Vast as Sky | The Roseline |
| 2012 | Moons & Junes | U.S. Elevator |
| 2012 | Brand New Step | Angelo Moore |
| 2012 | Proper Cowboy | Diego's Umbrella |
| 2012 | Handsome Sea | U.S. Elevator |
| 2013 | Give Me All You Got | Carrie Rodriguez |
