= Belinda Carlisle discography =

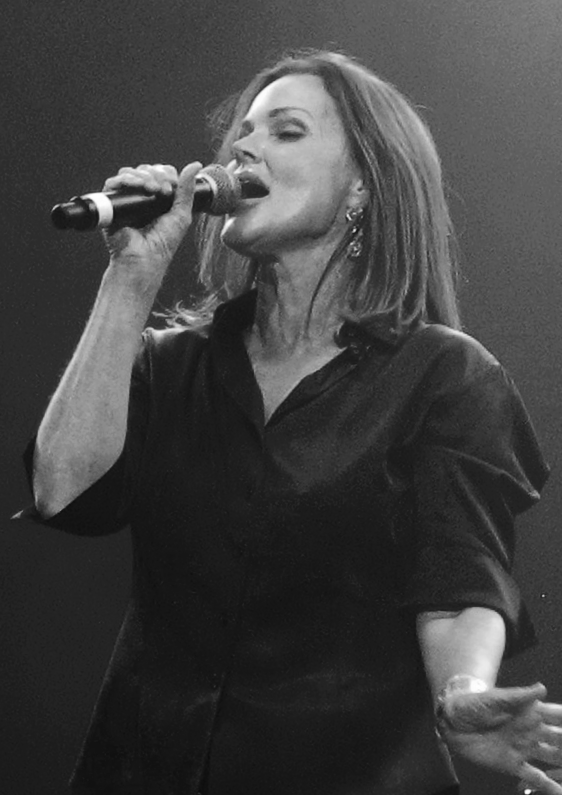
- Carlisle performing in 2011
- Studio albums: 9
- Extended plays: 1
- Live albums: 1
- Compilation albums: 11
- Singles: 44
- Video albums: 6
- Music videos: 31
- Other appearances: 9

The solo discography of Belinda Carlisle, an American pop singer, contains nine studio albums, 11 compilations and six video albums. Her singles discography features 32 physical releases (three of which she has recorded as a guest artist), eight digital-only and five promotional releases. She has also made nine other appearances and 31 music videos.

Carlisle's first solo album Belinda was released in 1986 on I.R.S. Records and was certified gold in the United States and platinum in Canada. Her first single, "Mad About You", peaked at number three in the US, topped the Canadian Singles Chart, and charted in the top 10 in Australia. The song was followed by "I Feel the Magic" and by a cover version of the Freda Payne song "Band of Gold". Carlisle's second album Heaven on Earth was released in 1987 through MCA and became a Top 5 bestseller in the United Kingdom and Australia. The first single release became "Heaven Is a Place on Earth", which topped the single charts in many countries including US and UK. The second single from the album was "I Get Weak", which shot to number two in the States and number ten in the UK. Third single, "Circle in the Sand" was another Top 10 hit in the US, UK and Germany. Other singles releases included, "World Without You", "Love Never Dies" and "I Feel Free".

The follow-up album Runaway Horses was released in 1989 and hit the Top 5 in both Australia and UK. The first single release "Leave a Light On", it became another top-five hit in the UK, Australia and Canada. Other singles were "Summer Rain", the summer mood influenced "La Luna" and "(We Want) The Same Thing". In 1991 Carlisle issued her fourth album, Live Your Life Be Free featuring such singles as"Half the World", "Little Black Book" and "Do You Feel Like I Feel". In 1992 she released her first greatest hits album The Best of Belinda, Volume 1 which reached number one in the UK and was certified double platinum and platinum in Australia.

Real was released in 1993 and debuted in the top ten in the UK. Singles of the album featured "Big Scary Animal" and "Lay Down Your Arms", a remake from the Graces. Three years later she released A Woman & a Man which included "In Too Deep". The song returned Carlisle to the UK Top 10 for the first time in six years, reaching number six. The song also made the top 20 in Australia (number 11). The second single release was "Always Breaking My Heart" which also made it into the UK Top 10, peaking at number eight. The album spawned two more singles: "Love in the Key of C" and "California". In 1999 the singer released a second greatest hits album in the UK entitled A Place on Earth: The Greatest Hits, and was certified gold in the UK. In 2007 Carlisle released Voilà, consisting of a mix of French pop tunes and chanson standards, including covers of Françoise Hardy and Édith Piaf classics.

In 2013, she released the single "Sun" to coincide with a new budget compilation in the US. A new career retrospective, The Collection, was released in March 2014, reaching number 24 in the UK along with the single "Goodbye Just Go".

In March 2023, Carlisle released "Big Big Love", the lead single from her extended play Kismet, Carlisle's first new English language studio collection in over 25 years.

== Albums ==
=== Studio albums ===
List of studio albums, with selected details, chart positions and certifications
Title	Details	Peak chart positions									Certifications
Title	Details	US	AUS	AUT	CAN	JPN	NZ	SWE	SWI	UK	Certifications
Belinda	Released: May 19, 1986; Label: IRS; Format: LP; CD; cassette	13	42	—	24	—	—	—	—	—	US: Gold; CAN: Platinum
Heaven on Earth	Released: October 5, 1987; Label: Virgin/MCA (US); Format: LP; CD; cassette	13	13	13	12	21	3	3	4	4	US: Platinum; CAN: 2× Platinum; SWI: Gold; UK: 3× Platinum
Runaway Horses	Released: October 3, 1989; Label: Virgin/MCA (US); Format: LP; CD; cassette	37	6	13	38	14	32	4	12	4	US: Gold; AUS: 2× Platinum; CAN: Platinum; SWI: Gold; SWE: Platinum; UK: Platinum
Live Your Life Be Free	Released: October 15, 1991; Label: Virgin/MCA (US); Format: LP; CD; cassette	—	27	—	80	32	—	21	32	7	UK: Gold
Real	Released: October 5, 1993; Label: Virgin; Format: LP; CD; cassette	—	61	—	—	26	—	23	—	9	
A Woman & a Man	Released: September 11, 1996; Label: Chrysalis; Format: CD; cassette	—	31	36	—	34	—	44	—	12	UK: Gold
Voila	Released: February 5, 2007; Label: Rykodisc; Format: CD; cassette; download	—	—	—	—	—	—	—	—	—	
Wilder Shores	Released: September 29, 2017; Label: Edsel; Format: CD; download	—	—	—	—	—	—	—	—	50	
Once Upon a Time in California	Released: August 29, 2025; Label: Edsel; Format: LP; CD; download	—	46	—	—	—	—	—	88	57	
"—" denotes album that did not chart or was not released in the region.

=== Compilation albums ===
List of compilation albums, with selected details, chart positions and certifications
Title	Details	Peak chart positions					Certifications
Title	Details	AUS	GER	NZ	SWE	UK	Certifications
The Best of Belinda / Her Greatest Hits	Released: September 7, 1992; Label: Virgin/MCA (US); Format: LP; cassette; CD	14	35	4	26	1	AUS: Platinum; UK: 2× Platinum
The Greatest	Released: March 28, 1998; Label: Toshiba EMI (Japan only); Format: CD	—	—	—	—	—	
Original Gold	Released: February 20, 1999; Label: Disky; Format: CD	—	—	—	—	—	
A Place on Earth: The Greatest Hits	Released: November 20, 1999; Label: Virgin; Format: CD; cassette	—	—	—	6	15	UK: Gold
The Collection	Released: February 15, 2002; Label: Virgin; Format: CD; cassette	—	—	—	—	—	
Essential	Released: March 31, 2003; Label: Virgin; Format: CD	—	—	—	—	—	
Icon – The Best of Belinda Carlisle	Released: March 19, 2013; Label: Geffen; Format: CD; download	—	—	—	—	—	
The Collection	Released: March 17, 2014; Label: Edsel; Format: CD+DVD	—	—	—	—	24	
The Anthology	Released: March 23, 2014; Label: Edsel; Format: 3×CD	—	—	—	—	—	
Gold	Released: September 6, 2019; Label: Demon; Format: 3×CD; 2×LP; digital download	—	—	—	—	11	
Nobody Owns Me	Released: October 15, 2021; Label: Demon (DEMREC964); Format: LP; Note: National Album Day exclusive	—	—	—	—	—	
Remixes	Released: April 23, 2023; Label: Demon (DEMREC1069); Format: 2×LP (limited 1500 copies); Note: 2023 Record Store Day exclusive	—	—	—	—	—	
"—" denotes album that did not chart or was not released in the region.

=== Live albums ===
List of live albums, with selected details
Title	Details
The Heaven on Earth Tour	Released: April 23, 2022; Label: Demon (DEMREC1001); Format: 2×LP (limited 2000 copies); Note: 2022 Record Store Day exclusive

=== Box sets ===
List of box sets, with selected details
Title	Details
Decades Volume 1	Released: 2023; Label: Edsel; Format: 4×CD; Note: first 4 studio albums
Decades Volume 2	Released: 2024; Label: Edsel; Format: 4×CD; Note: fifth to eighth studio albums

== Extended plays ==
List of EPs, with selected details
Title	Details	Peak chart positions
Title	Details	UK
Kismet	Released: May 12, 2023; Label: RAF/BMG; Format: LP; CD; download	95

== Singles ==
List of singles, with selected chart positions and certifications
Year	Title	Peak chart positions										Certifications	Album
Year	Title	US	AUS	AUT	CAN	GER	IRE	NL	SWE	SWI	UK	Certifications	Album
1986	"Mad About You"	3	9	—	1	—	28	—	—	—	67	CAN: Gold	Belinda
1986	"I Feel the Magic"	82	—	—	51	—	—	—	—	—	—		Belinda
1986	"Band of Gold" (featuring Freda Payne)^{[A]}	—	—	—	91	—	—	—	—	—	—		Belinda
1986	"Shot in the Dark"^{[B]}	—	—	—	—	—	—	—	—	—	—		Belinda
1987	"Dancing in the City"^{[C]}	—	—	—	—	—	—	—	—	—	—		Burglar (OST)
1987	"Heaven Is a Place on Earth"	1	2	10	3	3	1	7	1	1	1	CAN: Gold; NZ: 2×Platinum; UK: Platinum	Heaven on Earth
1988	"I Get Weak"	2	34	—	4	38	5	77	—	24	10		Heaven on Earth
1988	"Circle in the Sand"	7	—	26	5	9	6	22	—	—	4		Heaven on Earth
1988	"I Feel Free"^{[A]}	88	—	—	—	—	—	—	—	—	—		Heaven on Earth
1988	"World Without You"^{[D]}	—	—	—	—	—	21	—	—	—	34		Heaven on Earth
1988	"Love Never Dies"^{[E]}	—	—	—	—	—	—	—	—	—	54		Heaven on Earth
1989	"Leave a Light On"	11	5	4	6	15	4	7	8	8	4	AUS: Platinum; UK: Silver	Runaway Horses
1989	"La Luna"^{[D]}	—	21	29	—	16	—	70	—	10	38		Runaway Horses
1990	"Summer Rain"	30	6	—	22	57	26	—	—	—	23	AUS: Gold	Runaway Horses
1990	"Runaway Horses"^{[D]}	—	44	—	—	63	—	—	—	—	40		Runaway Horses
1990	"Vision of You"	—	84	—	74	—	—	—	—	—	41		Runaway Horses
1990	"(We Want) The Same Thing"^{[F]}	—	103	—	—	53	22	—	—	—	6		Runaway Horses
1991	"Live Your Life Be Free"^{[F]}	—	13	—	—	71	21	45	16	—	12		Live Your Life Be Free
1991	"Do You Feel Like I Feel?"	73	42	—	75	—	—	—	—	—	29		Live Your Life Be Free
1992	"Half the World"^{[D]}	—	129	—	—	62	—	—	—	—	35		Live Your Life Be Free
1992	"Little Black Book"^{[D]}	—	106	—	—	69	—	—	—	—	28		Live Your Life Be Free
1993	"Big Scary Animal"^{[F]}	—	56	—	70	63	—	—	—	—	12		Real
1993	"Lay Down Your Arms"^{[D]}	—	115	—	—	—	—	—	—	—	27		Real
1996	"In Too Deep"	—	11	—	—	—	—	—	59	—	6	AUS: Gold	A Woman & a Man
1996	"Always Breaking My Heart"^{[D]}	—	50	—	—	—	—	—	—	—	8		A Woman & a Man
1996	"Love in the Key of C"^{[D]}	—	—	—	—	—	—	—	—	—	20		A Woman & a Man
1997	"California"^{[D]}	—	199	—	—	—	—	—	—	—	31		A Woman & a Man
1997	"I Won't Say (I'm in Love)"^{[G]}	—	—	—	—	—	—	—	—	—	—		Hercules (OST)
1999	"All God's Children"^{[D]}	—	—	—	—	—	—	—	—	—	66		A Place on Earth: The Greatest Hits
Download-only
2013	"Sun"	—	—	—	—	—	—	—	—	—	—		The Collection
2014	"Goodbye Just Go"	—	—	—	—	—	—	—	—	—	—		The Collection
2015	"Have You Ever Seen the Rain"	—	—	—	—	—	—	—	—	—	—		80s Re:Covered
2015	"Silver Bells"	—	—	—	—	—	—	—	—	—	—		Non-album single
2021	"Get Together"	—	—	—	—	—	—	—	—	—	—		Nobody Owns Me
2023	"Gonna Be You" (with Dolly Parton, Cyndi Lauper, Gloria Estefan and Debbie Harry)	—	—	—	—	—	—	—	—	—	—		80 for Brady
2023	"Big Big Love"	—	—	—	—	—	—	—	—	—	—		Kismet
2023	"If U Go"	— (Note: Although If U Go did not enter the US Billboard 100 it did peak at number 29 on the Billboard Adult Contemporary Chart')	—	—	—	—	—	—	—	—	—		Kismet
2025	"The Air That I Breathe"	—	—	—	—	—	—	—	—	—	—		Once Upon a Time in California
2025	"One"	—	—	—	—	—	—	—	—	—	—		Once Upon a Time in California
"—" denotes releases that did not chart or were not released in the region.
A Released only in the US and Canada.; B Released only in the Philippines.; C Released only in Italy, Japan and Canada.; D Not released in the US.; E Released only in the UK.; F Released as a promo in the US.; G Released only in France and Germany.

=== Guest singles ===
List of singles as guest artist, with selected chart positions
Year	Title	Peak chart positions		Album
Year	Title	AUS	UK	Album
1989	"What Does It Take" (with Then Jerico)	154	33	The Big Area
1989	"Spirit of the Forest" ^{[H]} (with Artists United for Nature)	—	—	Earthrise: The Rainforest Album
1990	"Blue Period" (with The Smithereens)	162	99	11
2016	"California Blues" (with Gabe Lopez)	—	—	God Bless the Queens
"—" denotes releases that did not chart or were not released in the region.
H Released as a charity single, later added to the 1992 compilation album Earthrise: The Rainforest Album.

=== Promotional singles ===
List of promotional singles, with selected notes
Year	Title	Notes
1986	"Since You've Gone"	Released as a promotional single in the US and UK for Carlisle's first studio album, Belinda.
1992	"I Plead Insanity"	Planned to be the fourth single from Live Your life Be Free. Whilst no physical promotional item was released, a video was filmed, and a single edit and two remixes were made for a planned release. All three new versions and the video appeared on the Live Your life Be Free 2013 re-issue.
1997	"Remember September"	Released as a promotional 12" single in the UK for Carlisle's sixth album, A Woman & a Man.
1999	"A Prayer for Everyone"	Released as a promotional single in Sweden for Carlisle's second official compilation album, A Place on Earth: The Greatest Hits.
2007	"I Still Love Him"	
2025	"Never Alone" (with Nicholas Hamilton)	Released as a promotional single for the film, Brave the Dark.

== Other appearances ==
List of non-single appearances on other albums
Year	Title	Artist	Album
1987	"In My Wildest Dreams"	—N/a	Mannequin
1991	"Bless the Beasts and the Children"	—N/a	Tame Yourself
1993	"God Rest Ye Merry Gentlemen"	—N/a	The Holiday Collection: Volume II
1993	"I'll Do It Anyway"	The Lemonheads	Come on Feel the Lemonheads
1993	"One by One"	The Crash Baptists	The Harvest (OST)
1995	"Christmas Lullaby"	—N/a	Mother & Child: A Christmas Celebration
1996	"I Wouldn't Be Here If I Didn't Love You"	—N/a	(OST) Two If by Sea
1997	"Submission"	Radiator	Come Again
2005	"Dancing Queen"	—N/a	ABBA Mania
2018	"Through the Seam"	—N/a	B Is for Beer: The Musical
2018	"Nursery Rhyme"	—N/a	B Is for Beer: The Musical
2018	"Mystery Song" (featuring Laura Silverman)	—N/a	B Is for Beer: The Musical
2018	"The Real World" (featuring Laura Silverman, Paul F. Tompkins, Busy Philipps and Jon Cryer)	—N/a	B Is for Beer: The Musical

== Videos ==
=== Video albums ===
Title	Details	Notes
Belinda	Released: 1986; Studio: MCA; Format: VHS; DVD	Features "I Need a Disguise", "I Never Wanted a Rich Man", "Gotta Get to You", "Shot in the Dark", "We Got the Beat", "Band of Gold", "Lust to Love", "From the Heart", "Mad About You", "Since You've Gone", "Head over Heels" and "I Feel the Magic" (on DVD in a deluxe double disc set with a remastered version of the album Belinda in 2014).
Live!	Released: 1988; Studio: Virgin; Format: VHS; DVD	Features "I Feel Free", "Mad About You", "Lust for Love", "I Get Weak", "Fool for Love", "Circle in the Sand", "World Without You", "Nobody Owns You", "Our Lips Are Sealed", "Vacation", "Heaven Is a Place on Earth", "Love Never Dies", "Head over Heels" and "We Got the Beat" (on DVD in a double disc set with the remastered version of the album Heaven On Earth in 2009, while in a deluxe three disc set in 2013).
Runaway Videos	Released: 1991; Studio: MCA/Virgin; Format: VHS/LD	US version includes "Mad About You", "I Feel the Magic", "Heaven Is a Place on Earth", "I Get Weak", "Circle in the Sand", "Leave a Light On", "Summer Rain", "Runaway Horses", "La Luna".; International version contain "(We Want) The Same Thing" and "Vision of You", instead "Mad About You" and "I Feel the Magic".
Runaway Live	Released: 1991; Studio: MCA/Image; Format: VHS; LD; DVD	Features "Runaway Horses", "Summer Rain", "(We Want) The Same Thing", "Whatever It Takes", "Mad About You", "Circle in the Sand", "Nobody Owns Me", "I Get Weak", "Valentine", "La Luna", "Vision of You", "Leave a Light On", "Heaven is a Place on Earth", "Our Lips Are Sealed", "We Got the Beat", "World Without You" and "Shades of Michelangelo".
Live from Metropolis Studios	Released: 2013; Studio: Edsel (EDMTDVDX001); Format: DVD + CD; Note: Full concert filmed live on May 27, 2012	Features "Runaway Horses", "(We Want) The Same Thing", "I Get Weak", "Sun", "California", "Circle in the Sand", "Bonnie et Clyde", "Mad About You", "Vision of You", "La Luna", "Summer Rain", "Big Scary Animal", "Leave a Light On", "Heaven is a Place on Earth", "Live Your Life Be Free", "Our Lips Are Sealed", "We Got the Beat", "Ne Me Quitte Pas".
Access All Areas	Released: 2015; Studio: Edsel (AAACDVD003); Format: DVD + CD; Note: Recorded live at NEC Arena in Buckingham, England, May 26, 1990	Features "Runaway Horses", "Summer Rain", "(We Want) The Same Thing", "Whatever It Takes", "Mad About You", "Circle in the Sand", "Nobody Owns Me", "I Get Weak", "Valentine", "La Luna", "Vision of You", "Leave a Light On", "Heaven is a Place on Earth", "Our Lips are Sealed", "We Got the Beat", "World Without You", "Shades of Michelangelo".

=== Music videos ===
Year	Title	Director
1986	"Mad About You"	Leslie Libman
1986	"I Feel the Magic"	Marty Callner
1987	"Heaven is a Place on Earth"	Diane Keaton
1988	"I Get Weak"	Diane Keaton
1988	"Circle in the Sand"	Peter Care
1988	"I Feel Free"	(concert footage)
1988	"World Without You"	(concert footage)
1988	"Love Never Dies"	(concert footage)
1989	"Spirit of the Forest" (with Artists United For Nature)	Storm Thorgerson
1989	"What Does It Take" (with Then Jerico)	Andy Morahan
1989	"Leave a Light On"	Peter Care
1989	"La Luna"	Andy Morahan
1990	"Runaway Horses"	Greg Masuak
1990	"Summer Rain"	Andy Morahan
1990	"Vision of You"	(concert footage)
1990	"We Want the Same Thing"	Greg Masuak
1990	"Blue Period" (with The Smithereens)	John Lloyd Miller
1991	"Live Your Life Be Free"	Nick Egan
1991	"Do You Feel Like I Feel?"	Nick Egan
1992	"Half the World"	Nick Egan
1992	"I Plead Insanity"	Scott Kalvert
1992	"Little Black Book"	Dan Rucks
1993	"Big Scary Animal"	Jim Gable (US version)
1993	"Big Scary Animal"	Michel Gondry (UK version)
1993	"Lay Down Your Arms"	Neil Abramson
1996	"In Too Deep"	David Nelson
1996	"Always Breaking My Heart"	Philippe Gautier
1996	"Love in the Key of C"	Philippe Gautier
1997	"California"	Philippe Gautier
1997	"I Won't Say (I'm in Love)"	
1999	"All God's Children"	Lee Donaldson
2013	"Sun"	Dan Ruttley
2023	"Big Big Love"	
2025	"The Air That I Breathe"	
2025	"Get Together"	
2025	"One"	
2025	"Never My Love"	
