= The Collection (Belinda Carlisle album) =

Greatest hits album by Belinda Carlisle
- Released: March 17, 2014
- Recorded: 1986–2013
- Genre: Pop
- Length: 77:58

Belinda Carlisle chronology
Voila (2007)	The Collection (2014)	Wilder Shores (2017)

Singles from The Collection
- 1. "Sun" Released: May 20, 2013; 2. "Goodbye Just Go" Released: March 17, 2014

The Collection is the third greatest hits album by American singer Belinda Carlisle, released in the UK on March 17, 2014 by Demon Music Group.

== Background ==
"The Collection" followed a 2013 US budget compilation album entitled "Icon" and Carlisle's signing of her Virgin Records back catalogue to Demon Music Group. Though Carlisle had not recorded any new studio albums in English since the release of her last greatest hits A Place on Earth: The Greatest Hits, two recently recorded songs were included, the 2013 single "Sun" and a 2014 release "Goodbye Just Go". The album was released with a bonus DVD which included the videos of the songs on the album (excluding "Goodbye Just Go" which did not have a promotional video).

The album is notable in that it was the first greatest hits released by Carlisle to include singles from all six of her English speaking studio albums. Previous US greatest hits releases had only included singles from Carlisle's first four albums and previous UK greatest hits had omitted singles from her debut album which had been released by IRS Records. Whilst not owned by Demon Music Group at the time of release, the singles "Mad About You" (1986) and "In Too Deep" where licensed from their respective labels.

Notably the album omits one of Carlisle's seven UK Top 10 hits "Always Breaking My Heart" (1996). Unlike her previous greatest hits album, the singles "World Without You", "Runaway Horses", "Vision of You" and "Half the World" are included though unlike her previous greatest hits the final two singles from A Woman and a Man, "Love in the Key of C and "California", are omitted. The album does not include tracks recorded for her 1999 Greatest Hits album "A Place on Earth: The Greatest Hits" (including "All God's Children") or her 2007 French language album "Voila". An expanded release of The Collection entitled "The Anthology" was released a week later and includes these tracks along with all other omitted singles of Carlisle.

A television advert was released to promote the album and Belinda made a number of appearances on TV shows including BBC Breakfast and The Alan Titchmarsh show to promote the album.

== Track listing ==
No.	Title	Writer(s)	Length
1.	"(We Want) The Same Thing"	Rick Nowels, Ellen Shipley	4:19
2.	"Heaven Is a Place on Earth"	Nowels, Shipley	3:54
3.	"Live Your Life Be Free"	Nowels, Shipley	4:24
4.	"Leave a Light On"	Nowels, Shipley	4:16
5.	"I Get Weak"	Diane Warren	4:17
6.	"Big Scary Animal"	Charlotte Caffey, Carlisle, Ralph Schuckett	4:17
7.	"Runaway Horses"	Nowels, Shipley	4:13
8.	"Mad About You"	Paula Jean Brown, James Whelan, Mitchel Young Evans	3:35
9.	"Half the World"	Richard Feldman, Eric Pressley, Shipley	4:23
10.	"Sun"	Gabe Lopez, Belinda Carlisle, Jane Wiedlin	3:59
11.	"Little Black Book"	Richard Feldman, Marcy Detroit, Belinda Carlisle	4:14
12.	"Circle in the Sand"	Nowels, Shipley	3:42
13.	"In Too Deep"	Nowels	3:59
14.	"Summer Rain"	Robbie Seidman, Maria Vidal	4:12
15.	"Do You Feel Like I Feel?"	Nowels, Shipley	4:15
16.	"World Without You"	Warren	4:00
17.	"La Luna"	Nowels, Shipley	4:13
18.	"Vision of You (91 Remix)"	Nowels, Shipley	4:08
19.	"Goodbye Just Go"	Shipley, Nicky Holland	3:38

=== Bonus DVD ===
No.	Title	Writer(s)	Length
1.	"(We Want) The Same Thing"	Nowels, Shipley	4:19
2.	"Heaven Is a Place on Earth"	Rick Nowels, Ellen Shipley	3:54
3.	"Live Your Life Be Free"	Nowels, Shipley	4:24
4.	"Leave a Light On"	Nowels, Shipley	4:16
5.	"I Get Weak"	Diane Warren	4:17
6.	"Big Scary Animal"	Charlotte Caffey, Carlisle, Ralph Schuckett	4:17
7.	"Runaway Horses"	Nowels, Shipley	4:13
8.	"Mad About You"	Paula Jean Brown, James Whelan, Mitchel Young Evans	3:35
9.	"Half the World"	Richard Feldman, Eric Pressley, Shipley	4:23
10.	"Sun"	Gabe Lopez, Belinda Carlisle, Jane Wiedlin	3:59
11.	"Little Black Book"	Richard Feldman, Marcy Detroit, Belinda Carlisle	4:14
12.	"Circle in the Sand"	Nowels, Shipley	3:42
13.	"In Too Deep"	Nowels	3:59
14.	"Summer Rain"	Robbie Seidman, Maria Vidal	4:12
15.	"Do You Feel Like I Feel?"	Nowels, Shipley	4:15
16.	"World Without You"	Warren	4:00
17.	"La Luna"	Nowels, Shipley	4:13
18.	"Vision of You"	Nowels, Shipley	4:08

== Charts ==
Chart performance for The Collection
Chart (2014)	Peak position
Scottish Albums (Official Charts)	24
UK Albums (Official Charts)	24
UK Independent Albums (Official Charts)	3

== The Anthology ==
To tie in with the release of The Collection an expanded edition entitled The Anthology was released in a 3 CD and 2 DVD format in a 12"x12" hardback release.

The first two CDs include all of Carlisle's singles, including all the tracks from The Collection along with the singles "I Feel the Magic", "Band of Gold" from Carlisle's debut album Belinda, "Love Never Dies'" (the first time this single had appeared on a Belinda Carlisle compilation) and the US-only single "I Feel Free" from Heaven on Earth, "I Plead Insanity" (a planned single complete with promotional video that was ultimately unreleased) from the album Live Your Life Be Free and "Lay Down Your Arms" from Real (the only one of Carlisle's UK Top 40 hits to have never previously appeared on a Belinda Carlisle compilation). The singles "Always Breaking My Heart", "Love in the Key of C" and "California" from A Woman and a Man and "All God's Children", all of which were on Carlisle's previous greatest hits A Place on Earth: The Greatest Hits though missing from The Collection, were included.

Also added were a number of promotional singles including "I Still Love Him" from Carlisle's 2007 French language album Voila, "Valentine" from Runaway Horses which had been remixed for a planned single release and "A Prayer for Everyone" which was a planned second single from A Place on Earth: The Greatest Hits.

The third CD contained rarities and recordings from a live concert in Tokyo in 2013. The five rarities included two singles that had been released from film soundtracks; "Dancing In The City" from the 1987 film Burglar which had been released in the US on 7" and "I Won't Say (I'm In Love)" from the 1997 Disney film Hercules which had been released on CD in France and Germany . Three other tracks recorded for various compilation albums were also included. Upon the announcement of The Anthology and of it containing rarities, many fans had hoped that the previously unreleased song "In My Wildest Dreams" from the 1987 film Mannequin would be included, however Demon Music Group announced prior to the release that they had been unable to source a master copy of the track. A preview EP of the tracks from the Tokyo live set contained a recording of "Too Much Water" from the album Real though this could not be included in the release due to it containing an impromptu interpolation of "Walk On The Wild Side" by Lou Reed which Demon were unable to clear. A track entitled "Why" which Carlisle had written and recorded ten years earlier had been expected to be released on The Anthology after Carlisle stated in the booklet of the 2013 Heaven On Earth reissue it would be released in 2014 also went unreleased.

All of Carlisle's promotional videos were released on the first DVD (including both the UK and US versions of "Big Scary Animal") with the exception of "I Won't Say (I'm In Love)" which could not be licensed due to it containing images from Disney's Hercules movie for which Demon Music Group could not obtain clearance for. As with the 2013 re-issue of Heaven on Earth, the promotional videos for "World Without You", "I Feel Free" and "Love Never Dies" were of concert footage from Belinda's 1988 concert release "Good Heavens". The second DVD contained a number of live BBC performances and interviews.
