= Once Upon a Time in California =

Studio album by Belinda Carlisle
- Released: August 29, 2025
- Recorded: 2017–2025
- Studios: Los Angeles, United States
- Genres: New wave, pop rock, soft rock
- Length: 35:22
- Language: English
- Label: Edsel
- Producer: Gabe Lopez

Belinda Carlisle chronology
Kismet (2023)	Once Upon a Time in California (2025)

Singles from Once Upon a Time in California
- 1. "The Air That I Breathe" Released: June 6, 2025; 2. "Get Together" Released: July 17, 2025; 3. "One" Released: August 1, 2025; 4. "Never My Love" Released: August 29, 2025

Once Upon a Time in California is the ninth studio album by American singer-songwriter Belinda Carlisle. It is her first English-language studio album since A Woman & a Man (1996) twenty-nine years prior, her first studio album in eight years since Wilder Shores (2017), and her second release recorded in English since her EP Kismet (2023).

== Recording ==
Once Upon a Time in California was recorded in Los Angeles and produced by Gabe Lopez, who produced Carlisle's previous studio album Wilder Shores (2017). The album is by-and-large a cover album. The tracks on the album are covers of famous Californian rock songs from the '60s and '70s, including the timeless hits, "Get Together" and "Never My Love".

Carlisle and Lopez began recording the same year Wilder Shores was released. Once Upon a Time in California was originally planned to be released in 2021 or 2022, but after decades of being apart Carlisle reunited with renowned singer-songwriter Diane Warren, who wrote "I Get Weak" and "World Without You" for Carlisle's second studio album, Heaven On Earth (1987).

Warren finished writing her song "Big Big Love" in 2022 and was looking for the perfect singer to record it, so she worked with Carlisle on releasing the song as the first single for her EP Kismet (2023). After the release of Kismet, Carlisle resumed the recording of Once Upon a Time in California. She later released the album on August 29, 2025, about eight years since the release Wilder Shores.

== Singles ==
The first single from the album, "The Air That I Breathe", is a cover of Albert Hammond and Mike Hazlewood's 1972 song released on June 6, 2025. The single is followed by Carlisle's cover of the Youngbloods' timeless 1967 hit, "Get Together", released on July 17. A third single was released on August 1, "One", a cover of the 1968 jazz classic by Harry Nilsson. The fourth and last single of Once Upon a Time in California, Carlisle's cover of The Association's timeless 1967 hit, "Never My Love", was released on August 29. Carlisle says "Never My Love" reminds her of growing up in California. "I always loved the song and I wanted to put more of a twist on it," she explains, So I thought, ‘Well, maybe let's do some Beach Boys harmonies and layer vocals.’ So that's what we did and it totally worked with the song."

== Critical reception ==
Professional ratings
Review scores
Source	Rating
AllMusic	3.5/5 stars
Mojo	3/5 stars
Music Connection	8/10

Once Upon a Time in California received mostly positive reviews, with writers praising Carlisle's powerful voice. Cover Me's Seuras Og wrote positively of Carlisle's voice, "Rather than seeking to put any new spin on the large print ballads that these most are, it is her voice that is the single identifying factor for the set; it’s mixed high and proud, awash with luscious string arrangements and spry studio polish. Were it not for that voice, this might come across as too much." Rolling Stone's Bryget Chrisfield expressed interest in Carlisle's cover of "Everybody's Talkin'", "There’s also some outstanding layered vocals in Carlisle’s version of Harry Nilsson’s 'Everybody’s Talkin'." Ruby Risch of Music Connection praised her spirit of her vocals, "Her voice—those beloved Go-Go’s vocals—is still rich and unmistakably hers, wrapping itself around classics from Lightfoot, Bacharach, Nilsson, and more, giving them a new shimmer without losing their soul. ... In short, the record is her joyous restoration of heart-on-sleeve pop, oozing golden sounds that double as a heartfelt tribute to the California spirit that raised her."

AllMusic called the album "a passion project that succeeds admirably," further noting that "Carlisle's love of these songs is clearly sincere, and she sings them with an audible passion, though she manages not to sink into sentimental overkill, and her phrasing reveals a maturity that respects the tone of the originals while giving her personality a chance to shine through."

== Track listing ==
No.	Title	Writer(s)	Length
1.	"Anyone Who Had a Heart"	Burt Bacharach, Hal David	3:05
2.	"If You Could Read My Mind"	Gordon Lightfoot	4:20
3.	"One"	Harry Nilsson	2:52
4.	"Never My Love"	Dick Adrissi, Don Adrissi	3:36
5.	"The Air That I Breathe"	Albert Hammond, Mike Hazlewood	3:47
6.	"Time in a Bottle"	Jim Croce	2:46
7.	"Superstar"	Bonnie Bramlett, Leon Russell	3:57
8.	"Everybody's Talkin'"	Fred Neil	3:54
9.	"Get Together"	Chet Powers	4:09
10.	"Reflections of My Life"	Junior Campbell, Thomas McAleese	2:56
Total length:			35:22

== Personnel ==
=== Musicians ===
- Belinda Carlisle – lead vocals
- Brian Stewart – acoustic guitar, bass
- Courtney Chambers – acoustic guitar
- Gabe Lopez – acoustic guitar, backing vocals, keyboards, percussion, piano
- Alex Williams – strings
- Allison Irvine – strings
- Umberto Gaudino – strings
- Patrick Taylor – bass
- Will Lyle – bass
- Norm Antonini – percussion
- Will Grace – horns
- Angela Peele – backing vocals
- Courtney Allan Roberts – backing vocals
- Donna De Lory – backing vocals

=== Production and technical ===
- Gabe Lopez – producer, mixing, arrangements
- Scott Radke – mastering
- Simon Wadson – management

=== Artwork ===
- John Stapleton – art direction
- Albert Sanchez – photography

== Charts ==
Chart performance for Once Upon a Time in California
Chart (2025)	Peak position
Australian Albums (ARIA)	46
Scottish Albums (Official Charts)	11
Swiss Albums (Schweizer Hitparade)	88
UK Albums (Official Charts)	57
UK Independent Albums (Official Charts)	5
UK Album Sales Chart (OCC)	7
UK Vinyl Chart (OCC)	12
