= A Place on Earth: The Greatest Hits =

Greatest hits album by Belinda Carlisle
- Released: November 30, 1999
- Recorded: 1987–99
- Genre: Pop
- Length: 71:58
- Label: Virgin

Belinda Carlisle chronology
A Woman & a Man (1996)	A Place on Earth: The Greatest Hits (1999)	Voila (2007)

Singles from A Place on Earth: The Greatest Hits
- 1. "All God's Children" Released: November 15, 1999; 2. "A Prayer for Everyone" Released: March 20, 2000 (promo)

Professional ratings
Review scores
Source	Rating
AllMusic	4/5 stars

A Place on Earth: The Greatest Hits is the second greatest hits album by American singer Belinda Carlisle, released in the UK on November 30, 1999, by Virgin Records. A limited edition was released with a bonus disc featuring remixes and rare B-sides. A European edition was also released with an interview CD featuring Belinda providing answers to over 40 questions sent in by fans.

Three new tracks were recorded especially for this compilation - "Feels Like I've Known You Forever", "A Prayer for Everyone" and "All God's Children", which was released as a single. A promotional release of an edited version of "A Prayer for Everyone" was issued to Swedish radio stations but went unreleased. All three new tracks would later be released on a re-issue of Carlisle's final Virgin studio album Real.

The bonus disc included two non-album tracks ("Only a Dream", and "The Air You Breathe") originally released in 1992 as B-sides. These were for the singles "Half the World" and "Little Black Book".

The collection was a success in the UK where it made the top 20 and was certified gold.

== Track listing ==
No.	Title	Writer(s)	Length
1.	"Heaven Is a Place on Earth"	Rick Nowels, Ellen Shipley	4:08
2.	"I Get Weak"	Diane Warren	4:15
3.	"Circle in the Sand"	Nowels, Shipley	3:42
4.	"Leave a Light On"	Nowels, Shipley	4:16
5.	"La Luna"	Nowels, Shipley	4:12
6.	"(We Want) The Same Thing"	Nowels, Shipley	4:17
7.	"Summer Rain"	Robbie Seidman, Maria Vidal	4:11
8.	"Live Your Life Be Free"	Nowels, Shipley	4:23
9.	"Do You Feel Like I Feel?"	Nowels, Shipley	4:15
10.	"Little Black Book"	Richard Feldman, Marcy Detroit, Belinda Carlisle	4:12
11.	"Big Scary Animal"	Charlotte Caffey, Carlisle, Ralph Schuckett	4:15
12.	"In Too Deep"	Nowels	4:00
13.	"California"	Nowels, Billy Steinberg, Vidal	2:58
14.	"Always Breaking My Heart"	Per Gessle	3:06
15.	"Love in the Key of C"	Nowels	3:51
16.	"Feels Like I've Known You Forever"	David Munday	3:49
17.	"A Prayer for Everyone"	Marie-Claire D'Ubaldo, Nowels, Steinberg	4:21
18.	"All God's Children"	Paul Barry, Billy Lawrie, Mark Taylor	3:47

Limited edition bonus disc
No.	Title	Writer(s)	Length
1.	"Heaven Is a Place on Earth" (Heavenly version)	Nowels, Shipley	5:58
2.	"I Get Weak" (12" version)	Warren	7:32
3.	"Circle in the Sand" (Beach Party Mix)	Nowels, Shipley	7:51
4.	"World Without You" (Extended Worldwide Mix)	Warren	8:26
5.	"(We Want) The Same Thing" (Summer Remix)	Nowels, Shipley	5:08
6.	"Summer Rain" (Justin Strauss Mix)	Seidman, Vidal	8:03
7.	"Live Your Life Be Free" (Club Mix)	Nowels, Shipley	5:30
8.	"Only a Dream"	Caffey, Carlisle, Feldman	3:09
9.	"The Air You Breathe"	Donna Weiss, David White	4:27
10.	"Little Black Book" (Little Black Mix)	Feldman, Detroit, Carlisle	5:15

== Charts ==
Chart performance for A Place on Earth: The Greatest Hits
Chart (1999–2000)	Peak position
European Albums (Music & Media)	69
Swedish Albums (Sverigetopplistan)	6
UK Albums (OCC)	15
Scottish Albums (OCC)	56

== Certifications ==
Certifications for A Place on Earth: The Greatest Hits
Region	Certification	Certified units/sales
United Kingdom (BPI)	Gold	100,000^{^}
^{^} Shipments figures based on certification alone.
