= Gabe Lopez =

American musician (died 2026)

Background information
- Died: January 25, 2026 (aged 43)
- Occupations: Singer; songwriter; producer
- Years active: 1991–2026
- Website: gabelopez.com

Gabriel Lopez (died January 25, 2026) was an American singer, songwriter, and producer. He was known for his work on the music of RuPaul's Drag Race and for producing two of Belinda Carlisle's albums.

== Career ==
Lopez worked on eight songs featured in comedian Matt Rogers's 2022 Showtime special Have You Heard of Christmas?. Lopez also collaborated with Rogers in 2025 for the music for the Las Culturistas Culture Awards, notably Ben Platt's viral cover of Addison Rae's "Diet Pepsi".

Lopez was perhaps best known for his work with RuPaul's Drag Race, including remixing the RuPaul's Drag Race UK girl group number "Break Up (Bye Bye)"; producing the soundtrack to the show's live Las Vegas residency; and producing numerous Rusicals and grand finale talent numbers from 2020 to 2026. Lopez earned his first and only Emmy Award nomination for his work on the show, being nominated for the Primetime Emmy Award for Outstanding Sound Mixing for a Reality Program for his work on the episode "Wigloose: The Rusical!".

== Death ==
Lopez died from lymphoma on January 25, 2026. His death was announced by his mother the following day. The show RuPaul's Drag Race paid tribute to Lopez.

== Discography ==
- This Is About You (2006)
- God Bless the Queens (2018)

=== Production, songwriting, background vocals and remix credits ===
Title	Year	Artist(s)	Album	Credit(s)
"When It Comes"	2004	Tyler Hilton	The Tracks of Tyler Hilton	Backing vocalist
"Sun"	2013	Belinda Carlisle	The Collection	Composer
"Back to Life"	2013	New Kids on the Block	10	Composer, producer
"Now or Never"	2013	New Kids on the Block	10	Composer, producer
"Block Party"	2013	New Kids on the Block	10	Composer, producer
"Still Sounds Good"	2017	New Kids on the Block	Thankful	Composer, producer
"Adi Shakti"	2017	Belinda Carlisle	Wilder Shores	String arrangement, lyricist, composer, mixer, sound engineer, producer, acoustic piano, electric guitar, vocals, keyboards, harmonium, acoustic guitar
"Ek Ong Kar Sat Gur Prasad"	2017	Belinda Carlisle	Wilder Shores	String arrangement, lyricist, composer, mixer, sound engineer, producer, acoustic piano, electric guitar, vocals, keyboards, harmonium, acoustic guitar
"Light of My Soul"	2017	Belinda Carlisle	Wilder Shores	String arrangement, lyricist, composer, mixer, sound engineer, producer, acoustic piano, electric guitar, vocals, keyboards, harmonium, acoustic guitar
"Rakhe Rakhan Har"	2017	Belinda Carlisle	Wilder Shores	String arrangement, lyricist, composer, mixer, sound engineer, producer, acoustic piano, electric guitar, vocals, keyboards, harmonium, acoustic guitar
"Har Gobinday"	2017	Belinda Carlisle	Wilder Shores	String arrangement, lyricist, composer, mixer, sound engineer, producer, acoustic piano, electric guitar, vocals, keyboards, harmonium, acoustic guitar
"Humee Hum Brahm Hum"	2017	Belinda Carlisle	Wilder Shores	String arrangement, lyricist, composer, mixer, sound engineer, producer, acoustic piano, electric guitar, vocals, keyboards, harmonium, acoustic guitar
"Aad Guray Nameh"	2017	Belinda Carlisle	Wilder Shores	String arrangement, lyricist, composer, mixer, sound engineer, producer, acoustic piano, electric guitar, vocals, keyboards, harmonium, acoustic guitar
"Long Time Sun"	2017	Belinda Carlisle	Wilder Shores	String arrangement, lyricist, composer, mixer, sound engineer, producer, acoustic piano, electric guitar, vocals, keyboards, harmonium, acoustic guitar
"Heaven Is a Place on Earth" (acoustic version)	2017	Belinda Carlisle	Wilder Shores	String arrangement, mixer, sound engineer, producer, acoustic piano, electric guitar, vocals, keyboards, harmonium, acoustic guitar
"Break Up (Bye Bye)" (Much Betta remix)	2019	Frock Destroyers	Frock4Life	Remixer
"Frockmatica 1"	2020	Frock Destroyers	Frock4Life	Producer
"Losing Is the New Winning"	2020	The Cast of RuPaul's Drag Race Live!	RuPaul's Drag Race Live: The Official Vegas Soundtrack	Producer
"Mirror Song"	2020	The Cast of RuPaul's Drag Race Live!	RuPaul's Drag Race Live: The Official Vegas Soundtrack	Producer
"I Made It"	2020	The Cast of RuPaul's Drag Race Live!	RuPaul's Drag Race Live: The Official Vegas Soundtrack	Producer
"Viva Drag Vegas Runway Mega Mix"	2020	RuPaul	RuPaul's Drag Race Live: The Official Vegas Soundtrack	Producer
"I Made It / Mirror Song / Losing Is the New Winning" (Las Vegas Live medley)	2020	The Cast of RuPaul's Drag Race Season 12	—N/a	Producer
"Sticks"	2021	Ginger Minj	Double Wide Diva	Composer, producer
"Welcome to the Moulin Ru"	2022	The Cast of RuPaul's Drag Race Season 14	Moulin Ru! The Rusical!	Producer
"Charisma, Uniqueness, Nerve and Talent Interlude"	2022	The Cast of RuPaul's Drag Race Season 14	Moulin Ru! The Rusical!	Producer
"Jaloux de Ma Gelée"	2022	The Cast of RuPaul's Drag Race Season 14	Moulin Ru! The Rusical!	Producer
"Money Money Money"	2022	The Cast of RuPaul's Drag Race Season 14	Moulin Ru! The Rusical!	Producer
"Penniless Writer Interlude"	2022	The Cast of RuPaul's Drag Race Season 14	Moulin Ru! The Rusical!	Producer
"Love Medley"	2022	The Cast of RuPaul's Drag Race Season 14	Moulin Ru! The Rusical!	Producer
"Duke of Dickington Interlude"	2022	The Cast of RuPaul's Drag Race Season 14	Moulin Ru! The Rusical!	Producer
"Covergirl Tango"	2022	The Cast of RuPaul's Drag Race Season 14	Moulin Ru! The Rusical!	Producer
"Absinthe Interlude"	2022	The Cast of RuPaul's Drag Race Season 14	Moulin Ru! The Rusical!	Producer
"Green Fairy"	2022	The Cast of RuPaul's Drag Race Season 14	Moulin Ru! The Rusical!	Producer
"I Choose Myself Interlude"	2022	The Cast of RuPaul's Drag Race Season 14	Moulin Ru! The Rusical!	Producer
"Welcome to the Moulin Ru" (reprise)	2022	The Cast of RuPaul's Drag Race Season 14	Moulin Ru! The Rusical!	Producer
"Check My Track Record" (Angeria Paris VanMicheals)	2022	The Cast of RuPaul's Drag Race Season 14	—N/a	Producer
"Devil" (Bosco)	2022	The Cast of RuPaul's Drag Race Season 14	—N/a	Producer
"Fighter" (Daya Betty)	2022	The Cast of RuPaul's Drag Race Season 14	—N/a	Producer
"I Fell Down (I Got Up)" (Lady Camden)	2022	The Cast of RuPaul's Drag Race Season 14	—N/a	Producer
"I Hate People" (Willow Pill)	2022	The Cast of RuPaul's Drag Race Season 14	—N/a	Producer
"I Hate People" (Willow Pill; XL version)	2022	The Cast of RuPaul's Drag Race Season 14	—N/a	Composer, producer
"Wigloose Opening Interlude"	2023	The Cast of RuPaul's Drag Race Season 15	Wigloose: The Rusical!	Producer
"Black and White"	2023	The Cast of RuPaul's Drag Race Season 15	Wigloose: The Rusical!	Producer
"Black and White Interlude"	2023	The Cast of RuPaul's Drag Race Season 15	Wigloose: The Rusical!	Producer
"A Little More Drag Interlude"	2023	The Cast of RuPaul's Drag Race Season 15	Wigloose: The Rusical!	Producer
"A Little More Drag"	2023	The Cast of RuPaul's Drag Race Season 15	Wigloose: The Rusical!	Producer
"Drag Ball"	2023	The Cast of RuPaul's Drag Race Season 15	Wigloose: The Rusical!	Producer
"Drag Ball Interlude"	2023	The Cast of RuPaul's Drag Race Season 15	Wigloose: The Rusical!	Producer
"Built on Drag"	2023	The Cast of RuPaul's Drag Race Season 15	Wigloose: The Rusical!	Producer
"Wigloose"	2023	The Cast of RuPaul's Drag Race Season 15	Wigloose: The Rusical!	Producer
"Delusion" (Mistress Isabelle Brooks)	2023	The Cast of RuPaul's Drag Race Season 15	—N/a	Producer
"It's Giving Fashion" (Luxx Noir London)	2023	The Cast of RuPaul's Drag Race Season 15	—N/a	Producer
"Lotus" (Anetra)	2023	The Cast of RuPaul's Drag Race Season 15	—N/a	Producer
"Opening Number"	2023	The Cast of RuPaul's Drag Race All Stars Season 8	Joan! The Unauthorized Rusical	Producer
"MGM Queen"	2023	The Cast of RuPaul's Drag Race All Stars Season 8	Joan! The Unauthorized Rusical	Producer
"Interlude 1"	2023	The Cast of RuPaul's Drag Race All Stars Season 8	Joan! The Unauthorized Rusical	Producer
"Mommie Dearest"	2023	The Cast of RuPaul's Drag Race All Stars Season 8	Joan! The Unauthorized Rusical	Producer
"Interlude 2"	2023	The Cast of RuPaul's Drag Race All Stars Season 8	Joan! The Unauthorized Rusical	Producer
"No More Wire Hangers"	2023	The Cast of RuPaul's Drag Race All Stars Season 8	Joan! The Unauthorized Rusical	Producer
"Interlude 3"	2023	The Cast of RuPaul's Drag Race All Stars Season 8	Joan! The Unauthorized Rusical	Producer
"Bring Me the Ax"	2023	The Cast of RuPaul's Drag Race All Stars Season 8	Joan! The Unauthorized Rusical	Producer
"Interlude 4"	2023	The Cast of RuPaul's Drag Race All Stars Season 8	Joan! The Unauthorized Rusical	Producer
"Let's Go, Joan"	2023	The Cast of RuPaul's Drag Race All Stars Season 8	Joan! The Unauthorized Rusical	Producer
"Interlude 5"	2023	The Cast of RuPaul's Drag Race All Stars Season 8	Joan! The Unauthorized Rusical	Producer
"Not My First Rodeo"	2023	The Cast of RuPaul's Drag Race All Stars Season 8	Joan! The Unauthorized Rusical	Producer
"Hollywood Hag Superstar"	2023	The Cast of RuPaul's Drag Race All Stars Season 8	Joan! The Unauthorized Rusical	Producer
"I'm Still Joan"	2023	The Cast of RuPaul's Drag Race All Stars Season 8	Joan! The Unauthorized Rusical	Producer
"Also It's Christmas"	2023	Matt Rogers	Have You Heard of Christmas?	Producer, bass, drums, synthesizer
"Lube for the Sleigh"	2023	Matt Rogers	Have You Heard of Christmas?	Producer, bass, drums, synthesizer
"Have You Heard of Christmas?"	2023	Matt Rogers	Have You Heard of Christmas?	Producer, bass, drums, synthesizer
"Hottest Female Up in Whoville"	2023	Matt Rogers	Have You Heard of Christmas?	Producer, bass, drums, synthesizer
"Every Christmas Eve (Mrs. Claus' Theme)"	2023	Matt Rogers	Have You Heard of Christmas?	Producer, bass, drums, synthesizer
"RockaFellaCenta"	2023	Matt Rogers featuring Bowen Yang	Have You Heard of Christmas?	Producer, bass, drums, synthesizer
"Everything You Want"	2023	Matt Rogers featuring MUNA	Have You Heard of Christmas?	Producer, bass, drums, synthesizer
"RUM PUM PUM"	2023	Matt Rogers	Have You Heard of Christmas?	Composer, lyricist, producer, bass, drums, synthesizer
"Immah Have Your Back (This Christmas)"	2023	Matt Rogers featuring Vincint and Leland	Have You Heard of Christmas?	Producer, bass, drums, synthesizer
"God's Up to His Tricks!"	2023	Matt Rogers	Have You Heard of Christmas?	Producer, bass, drums, synthesizer
"Rain on Christmas"	2023	Matt Rogers	Have You Heard of Christmas?	Producer, bass, drums, synthesizer
"I Don't Need It to Be Christmas at All"	2023	Matt Rogers	Have You Heard of Christmas?	Producer, bass, drums, horn, synthesizer
"Opening"	2024	The Cast of RuPaul's Drag Race Season 16	The Sound of Rusic	Composer, producer
"My Heels Are Unfulfilled"	2024	The Cast of RuPaul's Drag Race Season 16	The Sound of Rusic	Composer, producer
"How Do You Tame Mariah?"	2024	The Cast of RuPaul's Drag Race Season 16	The Sound of Rusic	Composer, producer
"Mother Superior's Advice" (interlude)	2024	The Cast of RuPaul's Drag Race Season 16	The Sound of Rusic	Composer, producer
"Find Out for Yourself"	2024	The Cast of RuPaul's Drag Race Season 16	The Sound of Rusic	Composer, producer
"The Lord Gives Mariah a Sign"	2024	The Cast of RuPaul's Drag Race Season 16	The Sound of Rusic	Composer, producer
"Meet the Von Snapps"	2024	The Cast of RuPaul's Drag Race Season 16	The Sound of Rusic	Composer, producer
"GURL"	2024	The Cast of RuPaul's Drag Race Season 16	The Sound of Rusic	Composer, producer
"Break Up (Bye Bye)" (Coontettes remix)	2024	The Cast of RuPaul's Drag Race Season 16	The Sound of Rusic	Composer, producer
"Salzburg Rusic Music Singing Competition"	2024	The Cast of RuPaul's Drag Race Season 16	The Sound of Rusic	Composer, producer
"Where Are the Von Snapps?"	2024	The Cast of RuPaul's Drag Race Season 16	The Sound of Rusic	Composer, producer
"I'm Always Vight"	2024	The Cast of RuPaul's Drag Race Season 16	The Sound of Rusic	Composer, producer
"It's Literally a Five Minute Walk"	2024	The Cast of RuPaul's Drag Race Season 16	The Sound of Rusic	Composer, producer
"Let the Freak Out in You"	2024	The Cast of RuPaul's Drag Race Season 16	The Sound of Rusic	Composer, producer
"Find Out for Yourself" (reprise)	2024	The Cast of RuPaul's Drag Race Season 16	The Sound of Rusic	Composer, producer
"Bodysuit" (Plane Jane)	2024	The Cast of RuPaul's Drag Race Season 16	—N/a	Producer
"DANCE!" (Sapphira Cristál)	2024	The Cast of RuPaul's Drag Race Season 16	—N/a	Producer
"Queen of Wind" (Nymphia Wind)	2024	The Cast of RuPaul's Drag Race Season 16	—N/a	Producer
"¡Exploradora!" (Dora official theme song)	2024	Dora the Explorer	—N/a	Composer, lyricist
"Auditions"	2025	The Cast of RuPaul's Drag Race Season 17	The Wicked Wiz of Oz: The Rusical!	Producer
"Water"	2025	The Cast of RuPaul's Drag Race Season 17	The Wicked Wiz of Oz: The Rusical!	Producer
"40-20-44"	2025	The Cast of RuPaul's Drag Race Season 17	The Wicked Wiz of Oz: The Rusical!	Producer
"Before Dorothy"	2025	The Cast of RuPaul's Drag Race Season 17	The Wicked Wiz of Oz: The Rusical!	Producer
"Twister"	2025	The Cast of RuPaul's Drag Race Season 17	The Wicked Wiz of Oz: The Rusical!	Producer
"Fly!"	2025	The Cast of RuPaul's Drag Race Season 17	The Wicked Wiz of Oz: The Rusical!	Producer
"It's Got Soul"	2025	The Cast of RuPaul's Drag Race Season 17	The Wicked Wiz of Oz: The Rusical!	Producer
"What Happened in Oz"	2025	The Cast of RuPaul's Drag Race Season 17	The Wicked Wiz of Oz: The Rusical!	Producer
"Oz!" (finale)	2025	The Cast of RuPaul's Drag Race Season 17	The Wicked Wiz of Oz: The Rusical!	Producer
"Classic" (Lexi Love)	2025	The Cast of RuPaul's Drag Race Season 17	—N/a	Producer
"Ding" (Jewels Sparkles)	2025	The Cast of RuPaul's Drag Race Season 17	—N/a	Producer
"It Do Take Nurve" (Onya Nurve)	2025	The Cast of RuPaul's Drag Race Season 17	—N/a	Producer
"STAR" (Sam Star)	2025	The Cast of RuPaul's Drag Race Season 17	—N/a	Producer
"Gift Shop"	2025	The Cast of RuPaul's Drag Race Live!	—N/a	Producer
"Diet Pepsi" (Live from 2025 Las Culturistas Culture Awards)	2025	Ben Platt	—N/a	Engineer, mixer, mastering engineer, producer
"Anyone Who Had a Heart"	2025	Belinda Carlisle	Once Upon a Time in California	Arranger, producer, mixer, acoustic guitar, backing vocalist, keyboards, percussion, piano
"If You Could Read My Mind"	2025	Belinda Carlisle	Once Upon a Time in California	Arranger, producer, mixer, acoustic guitar, backing vocalist, keyboards, percussion, piano
"One"	2025	Belinda Carlisle	Once Upon a Time in California	Arranger, producer, mixer, acoustic guitar, backing vocalist, keyboards, percussion, piano
"Never My Love"	2025	Belinda Carlisle	Once Upon a Time in California	Arranger, producer, mixer, acoustic guitar, backing vocalist, keyboards, percussion, piano
"The Air That I Breathe"	2025	Belinda Carlisle	Once Upon a Time in California	Arranger, producer, mixer, acoustic guitar, backing vocalist, keyboards, percussion, piano
"Time in a Bottle"	2025	Belinda Carlisle	Once Upon a Time in California	Arranger, producer, mixer, acoustic guitar, backing vocalist, keyboards, percussion, piano
"Superstar"	2025	Belinda Carlisle	Once Upon a Time in California	Arranger, producer, mixer, acoustic guitar, backing vocalist, keyboards, percussion, piano
"Everybody's Talkin'"	2025	Belinda Carlisle	Once Upon a Time in California	Arranger, producer, mixer, acoustic guitar, backing vocalist, keyboards, percussion, piano
"Get Together"	2025	Belinda Carlisle	Once Upon a Time in California	Arranger, producer, mixer, acoustic guitar, backing vocalist, keyboards, percussion, piano
"Reflections of My Life"	2025	Belinda Carlisle	Once Upon a Time in California	Arranger, producer, mixer, acoustic guitar, backing vocalist, keyboards, percussion, piano
"Maybe I'll See You Next Tuesday"	2026	The Cast of RuPaul's Drag Race Season 18	Fannie: The Hard Knock Ball - The Rusical	Producer, background vocalist, synthesizer
"What's in a Ball?"	2026	The Cast of RuPaul's Drag Race Season 18	Fannie: The Hard Knock Ball - The Rusical	Producer, background vocalist, synthesizer
"Breezy Street"	2026	The Cast of RuPaul's Drag Race Season 18	Fannie: The Hard Knock Ball - The Rusical	Producer, background vocalist, synthesizer
"Hard Knock Queens"	2026	The Cast of RuPaul's Drag Race Season 18	Fannie: The Hard Knock Ball - The Rusical	Producer, background vocalist, synthesizer
"I'm Not as Think as You Drunk I Am"	2026	The Cast of RuPaul's Drag Race Season 18	Fannie: The Hard Knock Ball - The Rusical	Producer, background vocalist, synthesizer
"Lil' Bitches"	2026	The Cast of RuPaul's Drag Race Season 18	Fannie: The Hard Knock Ball - The Rusical	Producer, background vocalist, synthesizer
"See You Next Tuesday" (finale reprise)	2026	The Cast of RuPaul's Drag Race Season 18	Fannie: The Hard Knock Ball - The Rusical	Producer, background vocalist, synthesizer

== Awards and nominations ==
Year	Award	Category	Work	Result	Ref.
2023	Primetime Emmy Awards	Outstanding Sound Mixing for a Reality Program	RuPaul's Drag Race (Episode: "Wigloose: The Rusical!"	Nominated	
