= Thankful (EP) =

Thankful / Thankful (Unwrapped)

EP by New Kids on the Block
- Released: May 12, 2017
- Length: 16:49
- Label: NKOTB Music

New Kids on the Block chronology
10 (2013)	Thankful / Thankful (Unwrapped) (2017)	Still Kids (2024)

Singles from Thankful
- 1. "One More Night" Released: March 7, 2017

Thankful is the first extended play by American pop group New Kids on the Block, released on May 12, 2017. "One More Night" was issued as the first single on March 7, 2017, and premiered live on The Late Late Show with James Corden on March 6, 2017.

On December 1, 2017, the band published an expanded edition of the EP, called Thankful (Unwrapped), which included the original EP plus the Target bonus track with DMX, as well as three newly recorded holiday songs: "Unwrap You", "One Night of Peace", and "December Love."

== Track listing ==
Digital download version
No.	Title	Writer(s)	Producer(s)	Length
1.	"Heartbeat"	Demetrius L. Bledsoe, Kelvin Parker, Tanya White	Kelvin Parker, Freckles TheWriter	3:24
2.	"Thankful"	James Abrahart, Sarah Hudson, Jesse Saint John, Rob Persaud	Persaud	3:35
3.	"One More Night"	Jussi Karvinen, Jared Lee, Lee Anna McCollum	Jussifer	3:17
4.	"Hard (Not Luvin U)"	Damon Sharpe, Eric Sanicola	Sharpe, Sanicola	3:19
5.	"Still Sounds Good"	Gabe Lopez, Joey McIntyre, Brent Paschke, Drew Ryan Scott, Donnie Wahlberg	McIntyre, Paschke, Lopez	3:14
Total length:				16:49

Target edition bonus track
No.	Title	Producer(s)	Length
6.	"We Were Here" (featuring DMX)	Deekay	4:21

Unwrapped bonus tracks
No.	Title	Length
7.	"Unwrap You"	4:02
8.	"One Night of Peace"	4:05
9.	"December Love"	3:49

Notes

- "Still Sounds Good" contains portions of "99 Luftballons", written by Jörn-Uwe Fahrenkrog-Petersen and Carlo Karges.

== Charts ==
Chart performance for Thankful
Chart (2017)	Peak position
Canadian Albums (Billboard)	29
New Zealand Heatseekers Albums (RMNZ)	5
Scottish Albums (OCC)	55
UK Albums (OCC)	82
UK Album Downloads (OCC)	26
UK Independent Albums (OCC)	10
US Billboard 200	17
US Independent Albums (Billboard)	1
