= Wilder Shores =

Studio album by Belinda Carlisle
- Released: September 29, 2017
- Studios: John Deavers Studios and Nightbird Studios (Los Angeles, California)
- Genres: Chant; pop; raga rock
- Length: 45:27
- Languages: Punjabi; English
- Label: Edsel
- Producers: Gabe Lopez; Belinda Carlisle

Belinda Carlisle chronology
The Collection (2014)	Wilder Shores (2017)	Kismet (2023)

Professional ratings
Review scores
Source	Rating
AllMusic	3/5 stars

Wilder Shores is the eighth studio album by vocalist Belinda Carlisle. Unlike her previous releases, which have largely been characterized as pop music, it consists of a series of Sikh chants performed by Carlisle in Punjabi. It is her first studio album in ten years, since the release of Voila (2007), a collection of chansons Carlisle performed in French.

== Conception ==
Carlisle commented on her inspiration behind making the album, specifically her practising of Kundalini yoga; "I have been practicing Kundalini Yoga for over twenty five years and in the last twelve years I have built up a serious practice routine and begun studying the mantras that are used in classes much more closely. I’ve always wanted to do an album like this but I never felt I was ready until early in 2015. It’s not just music on this album, it’s a science that requires an element in the voice called the naad. Naad is almost a transference of energy through the voice and it wasn’t easy for me to learn.

"That being said, I am a pop singer so I could never be a traditional chant or kirtan artist as it would not be true to who I am. Wilder Shores is therefore still a pop album with the same structure of verse, bridge and chorus as my previous records but it is done with repetitive chanting."

== Reception ==
Haydon Benfield of Renowned for Sound wrote, "Being an album of chant, Carlisle’s matured soprano is definitely the centre of attention, and it is certainly pleasing, displaying a rich, resonant timbre throughout. Wilder Shores proves to be an easy listen, lending itself to being a good choice if the listener is seeking background music, but unless they are engaging in meditation, chanting along, or are aficionados, it is hard to picture the record from working other contexts." Timothy Monger of AllMusic added, "This yoga-inspired set certainly won't be for everyone, and while it would be all too easy to write off Wilder Shores as a late-career indulgence, give Carlisle credit for once again challenging herself as a singer and artist." Steve Harnell of Classic Pop Magazine commented, "Another intriguing back catalogue outlier, Carlisle’s first album in a decade and last to date is inspired by her practice of Kundalini yoga. Three years in the making, the LP sets traditional chants within a traditional Western pop framework and works remarkably well."

== Track listing ==
No.	Title	Writer(s)	Length
1.	"Adi Shakti"	Belinda Carlisle; Gabe Lopez	7:19
2.	"Ek Ong Kar Sat Gur Prasad"	Carlisle; Lopez	6:31
3.	"Light of My Soul"	Carlisle; Lopez	4:29
4.	"Rakhe Rakhan Har"	Carlisle; Lopez	4:50
5.	"Har Gobinday"	Carlisle; Krishan Khalsa; Lopez	5:59
6.	"Humee Hum Brahm Hum"	Carlisle; Lopez	4:44
7.	"Aad Guray Nameh"	Carlisle; Khalsa; Lopez	5:05
8.	"Long Time Sun"	Carlisle; Lopez	2:29
9.	"Heaven Is a Place on Earth" (acoustic version)	Rick Nowels; Ellen Shipley	4:01
Total length:			45:27

== Personnel ==
- Belinda Carlisle – vocals, string arrangements
- Gabe Lopez – acoustic piano, keyboards, harmonium, acoustic guitars, electric guitars, vocals, string arrangements
- Courtney Chambers – acoustic guitars
- Will Marsh – sitar
- Brian Stewart – bass
- Norm Antonini – drums
- Arjun Bruggeman – tablas
- Kevin Elliot – cello
- Petra Haden – violin
- Charlotte Caffey – vocals
- Peter Capozzi – vocals
- Simrit Kaur – vocals

=== Production ===
- Gabe Lopez – producer, recording, mixing
- Belinda Carlisle – co-producer
- Scott Radke – mastering
- Paula Harrowing – photography
- Stephen Molinaro – artwork
- Simon Watson – management

== Charts ==
Chart (2017)	Peak position
Scottish Albums (Official Charts)	86
UK Album Sales (OCC)	50
US World Albums (Billboard)	4
UK Independent Albums (Official Charts)	12
