= Sun (Belinda Carlisle song) =

Single by Belinda Carlisle

from the album The Collection
- Released: 2013
- Recorded: 2012
- Genre: Electro-pop; pop
- Length: 3:59 (original version); 3:01 (single version)
- Label: Demon Music Group
- Songwriters: Belinda Carlisle; Gabe Lopez; Jane Wiedlin

Belinda Carlisle singles chronology
"All God's Children" (1999)	"Sun" (2013)	"Goodbye Just Go" (2014)

Music video
- "Sun" on YouTube

"Sun" is a song by American singer Belinda Carlisle, and her first single after a 15-year hiatus. It was included on a US compilation album, Icon: The Best Of, and a UK compilation album, The Collection.

== Background ==
On March 13, 2013, following a lengthy break from releasing solo material, Carlisle announced that she would release a new single titled "Sun" and a new greatest hits compilation called ICON: The Best of in the United States on March 19, 2013. She had been performing the song live since early 2012, including during the live recording of her "Live from Metropolis Studios" in May 2012. This was released on CD and DVD in September 2013. The song, written by singer-songwriter Gabe Lopez, was introduced to Carlisle by her son James and was then sent to fellow Go-Go's singer Jane Wiedlin, who tweaked the lyrics. Lopez, Carlisle, and Wiedlin are listed as songwriters. The song was released in the UK on 20 May 2013 by Demon Music Group and received regular airplay on BBC Radio 2, hitting the Top 40.

"I'm at a point in my career where I don't have to record something unless I really love it. And for the last 15 years or so, truly great songs haven't been easy to find. So when I heard "Sun," I loved it, and I decided to record it. It's age-appropriate, while still being modern and youthful in its spirit, and I particularly appreciated that part of it., "

— Carlisle speaking about Sun

== Video ==
The video was filmed during her live performance at Live from Metropolis Studios in May 2012. Carlisle released the video for "Sun" on April 1, 2013, via her VEVO account.

== Reviews ==
'Radio Creme Brulee' gave the song 4.5 out of 5, saying "Sun is hands down Belinda’s best single in over two decades" Clare Heal of 'Daily Express' said Sun is "an infectious slice of electro-pop as memorable as anything from her heyday".

== Release history ==
Country	Date
United States	19 March 2013
Australia	20 May 2013
