= Love Never Dies (song) =

Single by Belinda Carlisle

from the album Heaven on Earth
- Released: November 27, 1988 (UK)
- Genre: Pop rock
- Label: MCA, Virgin
- Songwriters: Charlotte Caffey, Thomas Caffey Rick Nowels
- Producer: Rick Nowels

Belinda Carlisle singles chronology
"World Without You" (1988)	"Love Never Dies" (1988)	"Leave a Light On" (1989)

Professional ratings
Review scores
Source	Rating
Number One	1/5 stars

"Love Never Dies" is the sixth and final single from Belinda Carlisle's Heaven on Earth album, released in 1988.

== Track listing ==
1. "Love Never Dies" (single version)
2. "I Feel Free" (live)
3. "Circle in the Sand" (live)
4. "Heaven Is a Place on Earth" (live)

== Charts ==
Chart (1988)	Peak position
UK Singles Chart	54
