= All God's Children (song) =

Single by Belinda Carlisle

from the album A Place on Earth: The Greatest Hits
- Released: November 15, 1999
- Genre: Dance pop
- Length: 3:47
- Label: Virgin
- Songwriters: Paul Barry; Billy Lawrie; Mark Taylor

Belinda Carlisle singles chronology
| "I Won't Say (I'm in Love)" (1997) | "All God's Children" (1999) | "Sun" (2013) |

"All God's Children" is a song recorded by American singer Belinda Carlisle for her second greatest hits album, A Place on Earth: The Greatest Hits. It was written by Paul Barry, Billy Lawrie and Mark Taylor. It was released as a single in November 1999, reaching number 66 on the UK Singles Chart.

== Music video ==
A music video was created for the song, directed by Lee Donaldson.

== Track listing ==
1. "All God's Children"
2. "Runaway Horses"
3. "Only a Dream"

== Charts ==
| Chart (1999) | Peak position |
|---|---|
| Scotland Singles (Official Charts) | 71 |
| UK Singles (Official Charts) | 66 |
