= Belinda Carlisle =

American singer (born 1958)

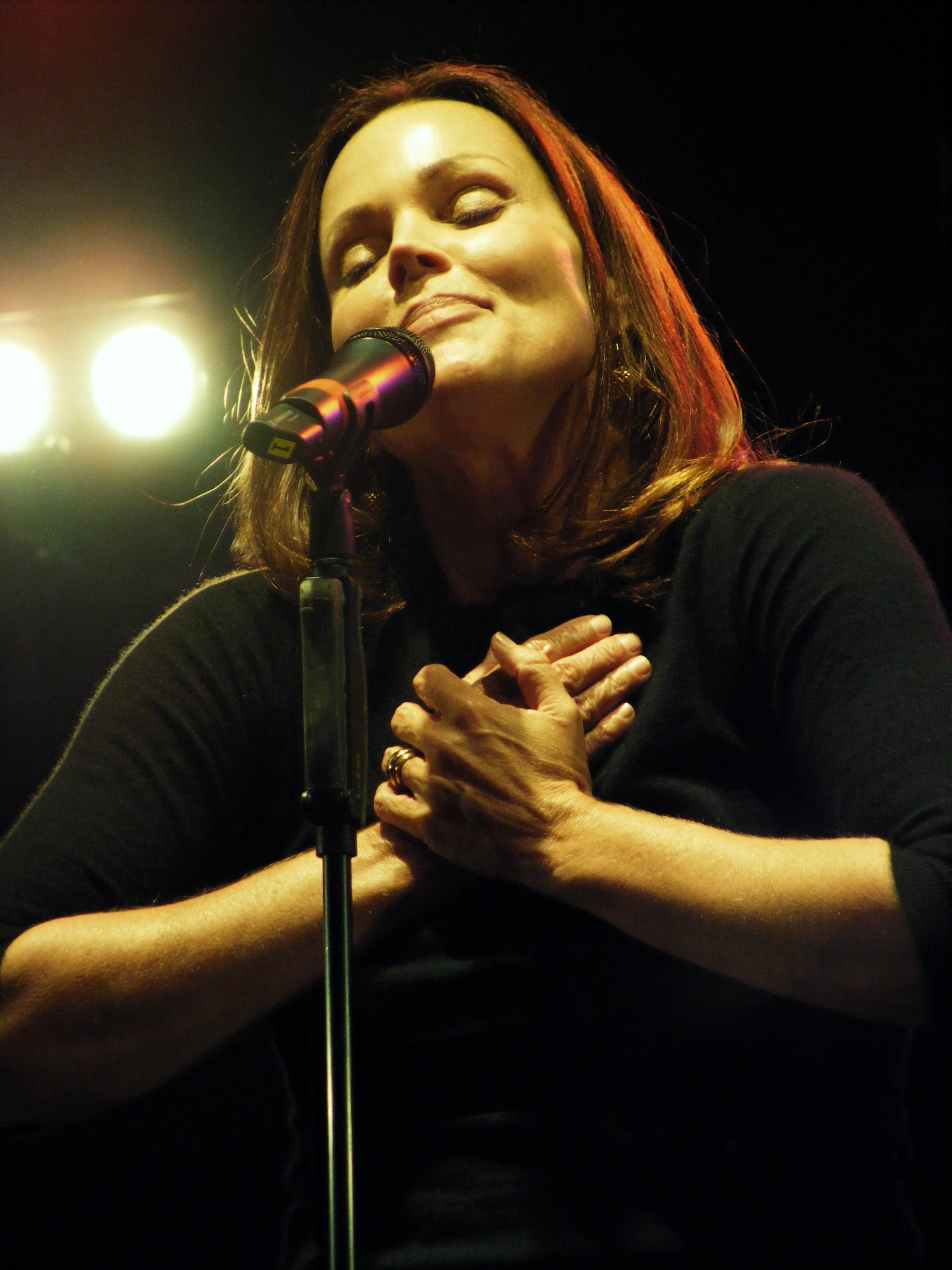
- Carlisle in 2010

Background information
- Also known as: Belinda Jo; Dottie Danger; Belinda Jo Kurczeski
- Born: Belinda Jo Carlisle; August 17, 1958 (age 68); Los Angeles, California, U.S.
- Genres: New wave; pop; pop rock; punk rock; power pop
- Occupations: Singer; songwriter; actress; memoirist
- Instruments: Vocals
- Years active: 1977–present
- Labels: I.R.S.; MCA; Virgin; Chrysalis; Ark 21; Rykodisc; EMI; Demon
- Member of: The Go-Go's
- Formerly of: Germs
- Spouse: Morgan Mason (m. 1986)

Belinda Jo Carlisle (/ˈkɑːrlaɪl/ KAR-lyle; born August 17, 1958) is an American singer and songwriter. She gained fame as the lead vocalist of the Go-Go's, and she went on to have a prolific career as a solo artist.

Raised in Southern California, Carlisle was the lead vocalist of the Go-Go's, which she co-founded in 1978. With their chart-topping debut album Beauty and the Beat in 1981, the group helped popularize new wave music in the United States. The Go-Go's have sold over seven million records worldwide.

After the break-up of the Go-Go's in 1985, Carlisle went on to have a successful solo career with radio hits such as "Mad About You", "I Get Weak", "Circle in the Sand", "Leave a Light On", "Summer Rain", and "Heaven Is a Place on Earth". The Go-Go's reformed in 1999; Carlisle maintained her solo career and performed with the band until its disbandment in 2022, returning for two festival performances in 2025.

Carlisle's autobiography, Lips Unsealed, published in June 2010, was a New York Times Best Seller and received favorable reviews. In 1999, Carlisle was ranked number 76 with the Go-Go's in VH1's 100 Greatest Women of Rock & Roll. In 2011, Carlisle, as a member of the Go-Go's, received a star on the Hollywood Walk of Fame. She and the band were inducted into the Rock and Roll Hall of Fame in 2021, and the California Hall of Fame in 2024.

== Early life and education ==
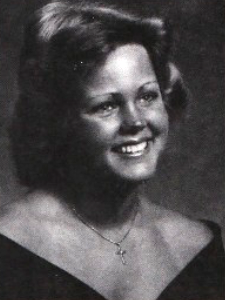
Carlisle in her 1976 yearbook photo

Carlisle was born in Hollywood, Los Angeles, California, to Harold Carlisle, a gas station employee, and his wife, Joanne (née Thompson), a homemaker. Her mother met her father, who was 20 years her senior, at age 18, and Carlisle was born nine months later. She was named after her mother's favorite film, Johnny Belinda (1948). Carlisle was the first of seven siblings; she has three brothers and three sisters. When she was five years old, Carlisle's father abandoned their family, and she has stated that she spent most of her childhood impoverished. As a teenager, she recalled owning "like, two outfits." According to Carlisle, her mother was very religious, while her father was not. In an interview with Slash magazine, she described herself as a reject from a Southern Baptist household.

Her mother later married Walt Kurczeski, who Carlisle says was an alcoholic and with whom she had a tumultuous relationship. She took on his last name during her high school years. The family moved frequently during her childhood, from Simi Valley to Reseda, before settling in Burbank when Carlisle was seven years old. At age ten, Carlisle began to express interest in music; she has identified the Beach Boys, Cat Stevens, the Stylistics, and the Animals as being early musical influences.

The family relocated again during Carlisle's adolescence, this time to Thousand Oaks, California. Carlisle attended Colina Junior High School in Thousand Oaks, where she was a third-string guard on the boys' basketball team. Later, she attended Newbury Park High School, where she was a cheerleader. During her teenage years, Carlisle became rebellious: "By the time I hit fourteen, I'd gone really wild," she said. "I ran away from home, smoked pot, dropped acid ... you name it, I'd try it." After high school, Carlisle worked at a House of Fabrics store and as a photocopier clerk at the Hilton Hotels Corporation in Los Angeles. She took night classes attending beauty college, but dropped out in the first year. At the age of 19, Carlisle left home to pursue a career in music.

== Career ==
=== Early ventures and the Go-Go's ===
Then there was a divide in the L.A. punk scene between the acid people and the opiate people. [Darby] was always with the heroin people, and I was always with the hallucinogenic crowd. But he was a genius and an amazing lyricist. There's no question he was a genius and way ahead of his time.

— Carlisle on Darby Crash and her early years in the Los Angeles music scene.

Carlisle's first venture into music was in 1977 as drummer for the punk rock band the Germs, under the name Dottie Danger. She was recruited into the band by Lorna Doom, whom she had met in an art class while a student at Newbury Park High School. However, her time in the band was short, owing to her contracting mononucleosis, and she never recorded or performed live with the Germs. According to Germs guitarist Pat Smear, upon quitting, she introduced her friend Donna Rhia, who became her replacement. Carlisle does appear on one recording introducing the band at a 1977 performance at the Whisky a Go Go, heard on the live album Germicide (1977). Around this time, Carlisle provided some backing vocals for Black Randy and the Metrosquad.

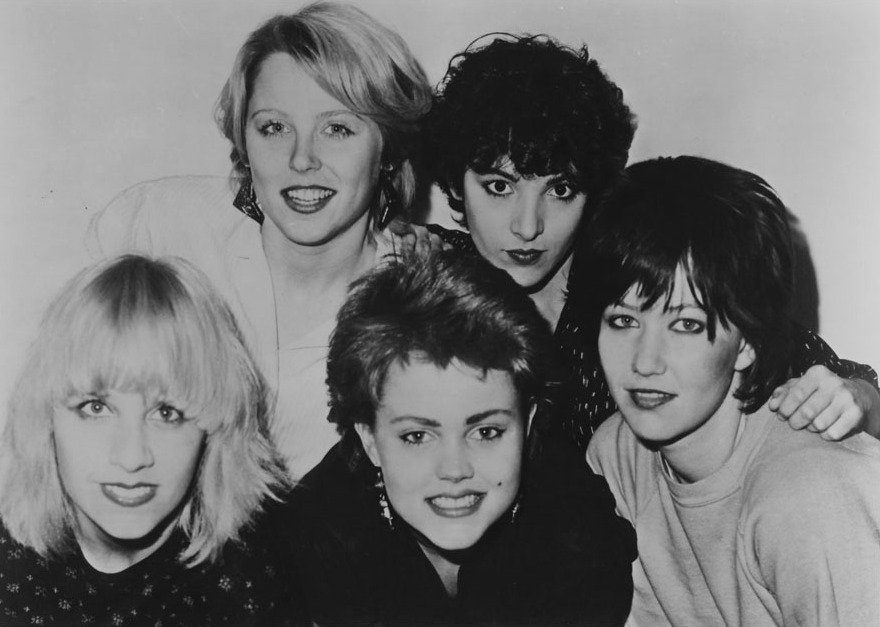
The Go-Go's, c. 1981 (Carlisle in front, middle)

Soon after leaving the Germs, she co-founded the Go-Go's (originally named the Misfits) with friends and fellow musicians Margot Olavarria, Elissa Bello, and Jane Wiedlin. Olavarria and Bello were soon out of the group, and the new line-up included Carlisle, Wiedlin, bassist-turned-guitarist Charlotte Caffey, guitarist-turned-bassist Kathy Valentine, and drummer Gina Schock. All five women were largely untrained musicians, and Carlisle recalls having to use tape as fret markers during their initial songwriting: "[Charlotte] had to show us how to plug in our amps," she said.

The Go-Go's went on to become one of the most successful American bands of the 1980s, helping usher new wave music into popular American radio, and becoming the first and only all-female band that wrote their own music and played their own instruments to ever achieve a number 1 album, Beauty and the Beat (1981), which featured the hits "We Got the Beat" and "Our Lips Are Sealed". The Go-Go's recorded two more albums on I.R.S. Records, including 1982's Vacation, which went Gold. "Head over Heels", from their 1984 album Talk Show, made it to number 11. In 1984, Carlisle made a foray into acting in the movie Swing Shift, appearing as a band singer alongside Goldie Hawn and Kurt Russell.

=== Solo career ===
==== 1985–1990 ====
The Go-Go's broke up in 1985, and Carlisle embarked on a solo career. Carlisle's debut solo album Belinda was released in 1986, also on I.R.S. Records. This album was successful in North America and was certified Gold in the United States and Platinum in Canada. Her summer hit "Mad About You" peaked at number 3 in the United States, and charted in the Top 10 in Australia. "Mad About You" was followed by the Motown-influenced single "I Feel the Magic" written by Charlotte Caffey, and by a cover version of the Freda Payne song "Band of Gold". All three songs were included on her debut album. The single "Since You've Gone", co-written by Lindsey Buckingham of Fleetwood Mac, was used only for promotion. Susanna Hoffs co-wrote the single "I Need a Disguise" in which she also sang backing vocals along with Jane Wiedlin. Duran Duran's Andy Taylor played guitar on some album tracks and appeared in her "Mad About You" music video. During this time, Carlisle also had songs featured on movie soundtracks, notably "In My Wildest Dreams" from the movie Mannequin (1987), "Shot in the Dark" from the Anthony Michael Hall thriller Out of Bounds (1986), as well as "Dancing in the City" from the Whoopi Goldberg movie Burglar (1987).

The musical style of 1987's Heaven on Earth eschewed the 1960s-influenced pop of Carlisle's debut album in favor of slickly produced 1980s power pop. It was released in the United States through MCA, and in the United Kingdom through Virgin Records. The album became a Top 5 bestseller in the UK and Australia, and was nominated for a Grammy Award. The album's first single, "Heaven Is a Place on Earth", topped the singles charts in the United States and the UK, with the dance mix of the song also topping the Billboard dance chart in the US. The promotional video was directed by Academy Award–winning American actress Diane Keaton. The second single from the album was the Diane Warren–penned "I Get Weak", which peaked at number 2 in the United States and number 10 in the UK. The third single from the album was "Circle in the Sand", another Top 10 hit in the United States, the UK, and Germany. "World Without You" was another British hit. Following the success of the album, Carlisle embarked on the Good Heavens world tour, which sold out Wembley Arena in London.

Carlisle's follow-up to the success of Heaven on Earth was Runaway Horses, released on October 23, 1989. The album hit the Top 5 in both Australia and the UK, certified double platinum in Australia and platinum in the UK and in Canada. The first release, "Leave a Light On", peaked at number 11 in the United States, and became another Top 5 smash in the UK, Australia and Canada. That year, Carlisle also performed co-lead vocals with the Smithereens in a duet with the band's lead vocalist Pat DiNizio on the song "Blue Period". The song was featured on their third album 11.

The second American single, "Summer Rain", reached number 30 in early 1990. The song reached number 6 in Australia. It was the final release from Runaway Horses in the UK where it was released as the album's sixth single in December 1990, peaking at number 23 in January 1991. Three further singles were released: the title track; "La Luna", which reached the Top 10 in Switzerland and Top 20 hit in Germany and Australia; and "(We Want) The Same Thing", which reached number 6 in the UK.

In the late autumn of 1990, the Go-Go's reunited for a tour to support their first greatest hits album, Greatest, including a new recording of the cover song "Cool Jerk" (The Go-Go's original cover was featured on their 1980 European EP, with a second version being released in 1982). A notable feature of the tour was an anti-fur campaign, where the band members supported the animal rights organization PETA.

==== 1991–1999 ====
In 1991, Carlisle released her fourth solo album, Live Your Life Be Free. The album marked somewhat of a return to 1960s-influenced music for Carlisle and included songs mainly written and produced by Rick Nowels but also two songs co-written by Carlisle. The single "Do You Feel Like I Feel?" was accompanied by a music video inspired by the B movie Attack of the 50 Foot Woman (1958). The title track, "Live Your Life Be Free", released as first single outside the United States, was a Top 20 hit single in many countries reaching number 12 in the UK and number 13 in Australia. Subsequent releases "Half the World" and "Little Black Book" (co-written by Marcella Detroit under her real name Marcy Levy) were also hits outside the United States. The album was also a success in Europe (Top 10 in the UK and Gold certification). "Do You Feel Like I Feel?" is Carlisle's final single to enter in the Billboard Hot 100 chart, peaking at number 73.

Still active in Europe and Australia with a recording contract at Virgin Records, her 1992 greatest hits album The Best of Belinda, Volume 1 reached number 1, and was certified double platinum in the UK and platinum in Australia. Carlisle's fifth solo album, Real, was released in 1993 on the Virgin label in the United States and in Europe. Produced without Nowels, the album was a departure from Carlisle's polished pop music formula. Carlisle co-produced and co-wrote much of the album, collaborating heavily with friend and ex-Go-Go member Charlotte Caffey. The album was Carlisle's fifth consecutive to reach the UK Top 10 peaking at number 9. It also peaked at number 23 in Sweden. Its lead single, "Big Scary Animal", peaked at number 12 in the UK. The second single from Real was "Lay Down Your Arms", which made the Top 30 in the UK. Also in 1993, Carlisle provided guest vocals on the Lemonheads sixth album Come on Feel the Lemonheads, and appeared with Crash Baptists for their song "One by One," on their soundtrack to the movie The Harvest.

The Go-Go's reunited in 1994 to support the retrospective double-CD Return to the Valley of the Go-Go's, their second collection, which featured three new songs, including the single "The Whole World Lost Its Head". However, the band broke up again, soon after the promotional tour. Carlisle returned to the recording studio, and resumed working again with Rick Nowels. In 1996 she released in the UK and Australia her sixth solo album, A Woman & a Man, on the Chrysalis label. This album, consisting of mostly relaxed adult pop, revitalized her solo career in Europe, and included several hits. The leadoff single, "In Too Deep", returned Carlisle to the UK Top 10 for the first time in six years, reaching number 6. "Always Breaking My Heart", written and produced by Per Gessle of Roxette, also made the UK Top 10, peaking at number 8.

The album spawned two further hits in the UK: "Love in the Key of C", and "California", which featured arrangement and backing vocals by Brian Wilson of the Beach Boys. The album reached number 12 in the UK, and was certified gold. As a result of A Woman & a Man's UK success, the album was released in the United States during the summer of 1997 on the small Ark21 label. In 1997, she recorded "I Won't Say (I'm in Love)" for the Disney movie Hercules.

In 1999, Carlisle released a greatest hits album in the UK, a double-disc on the Virgin label, collectively titled A Place on Earth: The Greatest Hits. The first disc featured Carlisle's hits plus three new tracks recorded for the album: the single "All God's Children", and the songs "A Prayer for Everyone" and "Feels Like I've Known You Forever". The second disc, subtitled A Place on Earth, contained previously released remixes of her hits and B-sides which had not previously been released. Despite being released only seven years after her previous greatest hits compilation, The Best of Belinda, Volume 1, the collection was a success in the UK where it made the Top 20 and was certified gold. Carlisle also opened for Cher during the European leg of her Believe Tour in 1999.

=== Later recordings and the Go-Go's reunions ===
==== 2001–2009 ====
In 2001, the Go-Go's reunited again and released an album of new material, God Bless the Go-Go's. Green Day's lead vocalist Billie Joe Armstrong co-wrote the only released single "Unforgiven". God Bless the Go-Go's received mixed reviews from critics. Peter Fawthrop of AllMusic wrote "Every bit as Go-Go's, that is, as their non-hits and less remarkable material. While the Go-Go's sound is intact, there is not a "We Got the Beat" or a "Head Over Heels" to be found. It is feasible that in this age of pop rebirth, the Go-Go's decided it was now or never ... The album doesn't attempt to update the band's sound with hip-hop moves or electronic frippery, for which God should bless 'em, indeed. The girls' hold on the current pop world remains so strong that Green Day's Billie Joe Armstrong co-writes a song ("Unforgiven") in impeccable Go-Go's drag". In spite of the mixed reviews, the album charted in the US Billboard 200, peaking at number 57. Around the time of the Go-Go's definitive reunion tour, Carlisle appeared nude for the cover feature and a full pictorial of the August 2001 edition of Playboy.

In 2007, Carlisle released her seventh album, Voila, which was her first full-length solo album in more than ten years. The album was produced by John Reynolds and included Brian Eno on keyboards. Consisting of a mix of French pop tunes and chanson standards, including covers of Françoise Hardy and Édith Piaf classics, Voila was released via Rykodisc in the UK on February 5 and in the United States the following day, February 6, 2007. In early 2009, Carlisle was on the eighth season of Dancing with the Stars, paired with Jonathan Roberts. She was the first star to be eliminated from the competition, on March 17. In October 2009, Carlisle took over the role of Velma Von Tussle in London's West End production of Hairspray at the Shaftesbury Theatre. She remained with the show until late January 2010 and was replaced by Siobhán McCarthy.

==== 2010–2020 ====
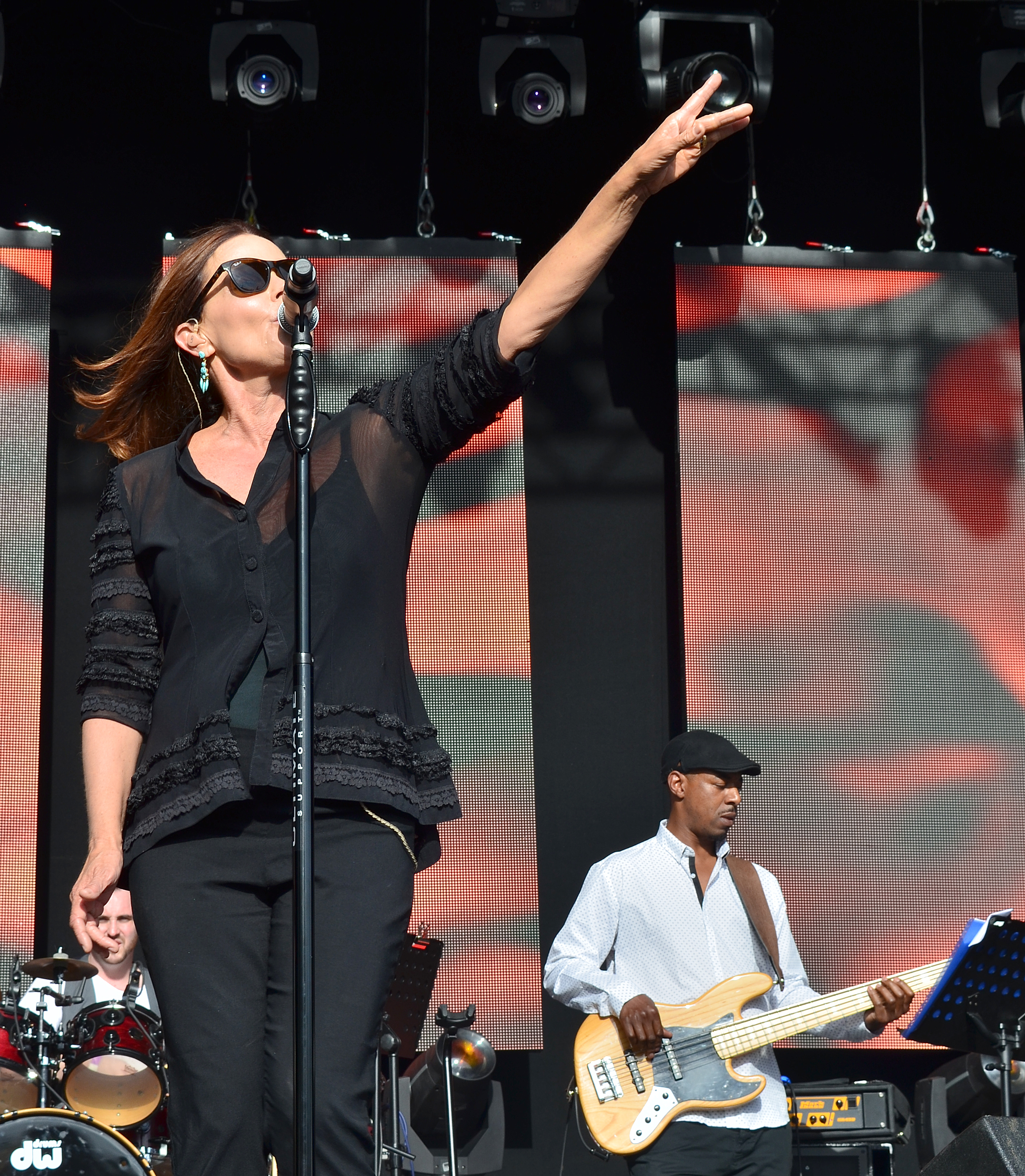
Carlisle performing in 2014

Between 2011 and 2012, Carlisle embarked on a United States tour with the Go-Go's, which included concerts at the Greek Theatre in Los Angeles in August 2011 and the Hollywood Bowl in September 2012. In March 2013, Carlisle released her first US single in seventeen years titled "Sun", an up-tempo pop song, which was included on ICON – The Best of Belinda Carlisle, a new greatest hits compilation album. The single was also released in the United Kingdom. The song was written by Carlisle, Jane Wiedlin of the Go-Go's and singer-songwriter Gabe Lopez. Lopez also produced the song. While the track did not chart, it received positive reviews.

In August 2013, Edsel Records released remastered, three-disc versions of Heaven on Earth, Runaway Horses, Live Your Life Be Free and Real. Each album comprised a remastered version of the original LP followed by the 7-inch or radio edits of each single from that album, a second disc of remixes and 12-inch versions of all the singles, and a DVD comprising the promotional videos for the singles. Some of singles and remixes had never previously been released on CD. In March 2014, a new Greatest Hits titled The Collection was released containing 18 hits and one new song, "Goodbye Just Go", along with a DVD of 18 videos. The album reached number 24 in the UK.

Also in March 2014, another digitally remastered, five-disc retrospective collection titled Anthology was released. The anthology included "Dancing in the City", which had previously only been available on the Japanese LP/CD for the soundtrack to the 1987 movie I Won't Say I'm in Love which had previously only been released in 1997 as a CD single in France. It also included all three singles from her debut album and all four singles from A Woman & a Man. Later in 2014, Carlisle's three other albums, Belinda, A Woman & a Man and Voila were re-issued by Edsel on CD, although there were a number of issues with their production.

Carlisle confirmed in a radio interview in August 2015 that she had completed work on a new album, earmarked for release in January 2016. She commented that the music on the album would be partly inspired by Kundalini yoga, which she had taken up while pregnant during 1991–1992 and of which she had qualified as a teacher since becoming sober in 2005. Also in August 2015, Edsel released a box set of all the commercially released singles from Carlisle's albums, plus a bonus disc featuring a previously unreleased recording of "In My Wildest Dreams", which had featured in the 1987 film Mannequin. In late 2016, the Go-Go's completed an international tour with Best Coast as a supporting act, which Carlisle stated would likely be their last tour together. Carlisle's eighth album, a selection of Gurmukhi chants titled Wilder Shores, was released in September 2017. Carlisle and the Go-Go's announced an 11-date reunion tour scheduled to begin in June 2020. However, in May 2020 the tour was postponed due to the COVID-19 pandemic.

==== 2021–present: Musical comeback ====
In May 2021, it was announced that the Go-Go's would be inducted into the Rock and Roll Hall of Fame. The band performed "Vacation", "Our Lips Are Sealed", and "We Got the Beat" during the induction ceremony. Her ex-bandmate from the Germs, Pat Smear was also inducted on a same day as a member of Foo Fighters.

The band confirmed plans for a 2022 UK tour with Billy Idol that was supposed to start in June 2022 but was later scrapped due to Idol's health and the Go-Go's other commitments. The band was forced to postpone a short West Coast tour scheduled for the first week of January 2022 due to a COVID-19 case involving someone on the tour, saying that rescheduled dates for the shows would be announced. However, in 2023, Carlisle declared that the group had disbanded, though they reunited for several concerts in 2025.

On March 16, 2023, Carlisle released "Big Big Love", the first single from Kismet, a five track EP, penned by Diane Warren. The EP, released May 17, 2023, marks her first release of English-language pop music in twenty-seven years. It charted in several countries, marking a return to the charts for Carlisle. She also announced her intention to follow up on the release with a new English-language album, produced by Gabe Lopez. In February 2024, Carlisle and the Go-Go's were inducted into the California Hall of Fame by the Governor of California, Gavin Newsom and his wife, First Partner Jennifer Siebel Newsom.

Carlisle released her ninth album, Once Upon a Time in California, on August 29, 2025. The album was preceded by the first single, "The Air That I Breathe", on June 6, 2025.

== Musical style and influences ==
One day I walked into the record store and I saw the cover of [the Stooges'] Raw Power. And I said, "Who's that?" I bought the album and it opened up a whole new world I didn't even know existed...I started going into L.A. to see bands. Post-glitter bands.

— Carlisle on her early influences, 2010

Carlisle has been noted by critics for her dynamic soprano vocal range. While Carlisle's discography both with the Go-Go's and in her solo work has been predominately characterized as pop music, some music scholars such as Greil Marcus have noted a confluence of subtle punk influences as well as pop rock, specifically in the Go-Go's early releases (Marcus suggests that any traces of punk influence were carried over from Carlisle's brief tenure in the Germs).

Carlisle has been alternately described by critics as a "punk diva" and "pop princess". As a singer in the Go-Go's, Carlisle was associated with the new wave genre, and the band was remarked by critics for their style that "inject[ed] punk with the sound of California surf music." Her subsequent solo releases, beginning with her self-titled solo debut, Belinda (1986), were described by critics as more polished contemporary pop music.

Her early inspirations during her childhood were the Beach Boys, Cat Stevens, the Stylistics, and the Animals. As a teenager, she saw Iggy Pop on the cover of the Stooges' Raw Power (1973) in a record store, an album which she credited as a gateway exposing her to punk and art rock acts such as the Velvet Underground, New York Dolls, Roxy Music, and the Sex Pistols. In a 2013 interview, Carlisle stated that despite having recorded an abundance of it throughout her career, she "didn't really listen to pop music", and had recently been inspired by jazz artists such as Miles Davis.

Carlisle is known for performing barefoot on stage.

== Personal life ==
=== Relationships and family ===
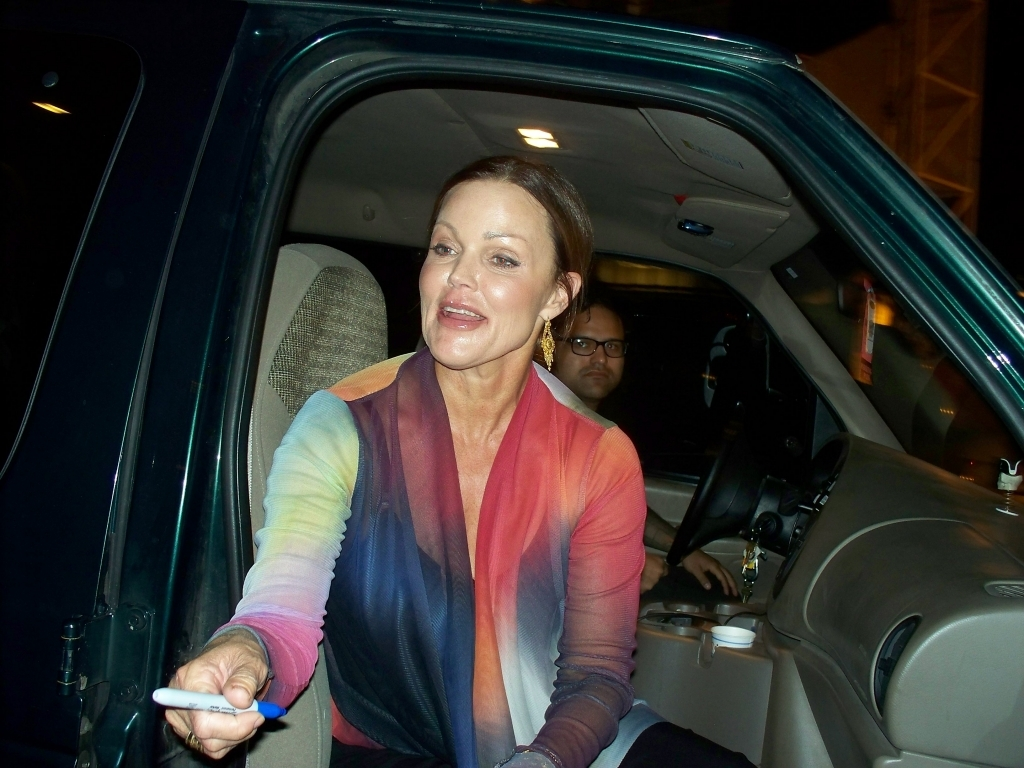
Carlisle signing autographs in 2012

Carlisle had a two-year relationship with Bill Bateman, drummer for the Blasters, in the early 1980s. She broke up abruptly with Bateman because she had taken up with Mike Marshall of the Los Angeles Dodgers. Her cocaine use was a negative influence on these relationships.

In 1986, Carlisle married political operative and film producer Morgan Mason, son of English actor James Mason and actress Pamela Kellino. He made appearances in Carlisle's music videos "Mad About You" and "Heaven Is a Place on Earth". They have one son, James Duke Mason, a politician, writer, activist, and political commentator, who was born in 1992. After the 1994 Northridge earthquake, Carlisle and her family moved to Fréjus in south-eastern France. They lived between there and the U.S. In 2017, the couple moved to Bangkok, Thailand. As of 2024, they now reside in Mexico City, Mexico.

In a 1990 interview with Spin, Carlisle stated that she was not close with her siblings or parents, saying: "I want to be close to them. I kind of feel uncomfortable. I think I feel guilty sometimes about my success in some ways."

=== Health ===
During the initial stages of her tenure with the Go-Go's, Carlisle developed a serious addiction to cocaine and alcohol that went on to span 30 years. Simultaneously, she had developed an eating disorder which she said stemmed from media comments regarding her appearance; her excessive cocaine use helped keep her weight down. Additionally, Carlisle admitted to using LSD, quaaludes, and MDA regularly as both a teenager and adult. In a 2017 interview, she told The Guardian that she "couldn't believe [she wasn't] dead".

In 2005, at the height of her drug abuse, Carlisle spent three days isolated in a London hotel room binging cocaine. At one point, she recalled that she looked at herself in the mirror and was alarmed that she "didn't see a light or a soul" in her eyes. "I sat in my room and did [cocaine] all evening. Between lines [of cocaine], I smoked cigarettes, played games on my laptop, and paced the room. I must have smoked ten packs of cigarettes in two days." On the third day, Carlisle said she had a vision of herself being found dead in a hotel, accompanied by an auditory hallucination in which a loud voice informed her: "You are going to die here if you carry on like this." The incident jarred Carlisle into seeking sobriety, and she says she has been sober since 2005.

She told The Sydney Morning Herald in 2014: "I don't smoke anymore, I don't drink any more and I don't do drugs any more. I am very much into my Buddhism. I found turning 40 [in 1998] a real passage in time for me." Carlisle states in her autobiography Lips Unsealed: A Memoir (2010) that she has practiced Nichiren Buddhism as a member of the Soka Gakkai International since 2002, and she often mentions in press interviews that she chants Nam Myōhō Renge Kyō daily. She has also credited the practice with helping her maintain sobriety.

== Activism ==
Carlisle supports LGBT rights, which she made public after her son came out to her at age fourteen in 2006.

In 2014, Carlisle co-founded Animal People Alliance, a nonprofit organization based in Calcutta, India, that raises funds and trains and employs impoverished women to care for street animals. "We are teaching people that animals have feelings," says Carlisle. "How to recognize a street animal in distress. There is a middle class developing and they still don't have proper vet care, so a lot of what we do will be educational. We're partnering with a hospital in Calcutta to teach about adoption and to get access to emergency rooms."

In May 2024, Carlisle was honored with the Harvey Milk Medal, presented to her by her son and by Stuart Milk, by the Harvey Milk Foundation for her gay rights advocacy. In June of that same year she was awarded with the 2024 YGB Namaste Award for her animal advocacy by the organization Yoga Gives Back.

== Awards and nominations ==
Billboard Music Awards

Year	Nominee / work	Award	Result	Ref.
1986	Herself	Top Billboard 200 Artist	91st	
1986	Herself	Top Billboard 200 Artist – Female	11th	
1986	Herself	Top Hot 100 Artist	91st	
1986	Herself	Top Hot 100 Artist – Female	9th	
1986	Belinda	Top Billboard 200 Album	Nominated	
1986	"Mad About You"	Top Hot 100 Song	Nominated	
1987	Herself	Top Hot 100 Artist	Nominated	
1987	Herself	Top Hot 100 Artist – Female	Nominated	
1988	Herself	Top Female Artist	Nominated	
1988	Herself	Top Hot 100 Artist – Female	Nominated	
1988	Herself	Top Billboard 200 Artist – Female	Nominated	
1988	Herself	Top Adult Contemporary Artist	Nominated	
1988	Herself	Top Adult Contemporary Artist – Female	Nominated	
1988	"Heaven Is a Place on Earth"	Top Hot 100 Song	Nominated	

Other awards

Year	Awards	Work	Category	Result
1986	American Music Awards	Herself	Favorite Female Pop/Rock Video Artist	Nominated
1986	American Music Awards	"Mad About You"	Favorite Pop/Rock Video	Nominated
1988	Smash Hits Poll Winners Party	Herself	Best Female Solo Singer	Nominated
1988	Smash Hits Poll Winners Party	Herself	Worst Female Solo Singer	Nominated
1988	Grammy Awards	"Heaven Is a Place on Earth"	Best Female Pop Vocal Performance	Nominated
1989	World Music Awards	Herself	Female Artist of the Year	Won
1989	Brit Awards	Herself	International Breakthrough Act	Nominated
1996	Smash Hits Poll Winners Party	Herself	Best Female Singer	Nominated
2016	Independent Music Awards	"California Blues" (ft. Gabe Lopez)	Best Pop Single	Nominated
2018	Music Week Awards	Herself	Catalogue Marketing Champaign	Nominated

== Discography ==
Studio albums

- Belinda (1986)
- Heaven on Earth (1987)
- Runaway Horses (1989)
- Live Your Life Be Free (1991)
- Real (1993)
- A Woman & a Man (1996)
- Voila (2007)
- Wilder Shores (2017)
- Once Upon a Time in California (2025)

Extended plays

- Kismet (2023)

== See also ==
- List of artists who reached number one in the United States
- List of artists who reached number one on the UK Singles Chart
- List of artists who reached number one in Ireland
- List of number-one singles of 1986 (Canada)

== Sources ==
- Carlisle, Belinda (2011). Lips Unsealed: A Memoir. Crown Publishing Group. ISBN 978-0-307-46350-0.
- Marcus, Greil (1999). In the Fascist Bathroom: Punk in Pop Music, 1977-1992. Harvard University Press. ISBN 978-0-674-44577-2.
- Quisling, Erik (2003). Straight Whisky: A Living History of Sex, Drugs, and Rock 'n' Roll on the Sunset Strip. Bonus Books. ISBN 978-1-566-25197-6.
- Spitz, Marc; Mullen, Brendan (2010). We Got the Neutron Bomb: The Untold Story of L.A. Punk. Crown/Archetype. ISBN 978-0-307-56624-9.
