= Voila (album) =

Studio album by Belinda Carlisle
- Released: February 5, 2007
- Genres: Chanson; pop
- Languages: French; English (bonus disc only)
- Label: Rykodisc
- Producer: John Reynolds

Belinda Carlisle chronology
A Place on Earth: The Greatest Hits (1999)	Voila (2007)	The Collection (2014)

Singles from Voila
- 1. "I Still Love Him (promo)" Released: 2007

Voila is the seventh studio album by the American singer Belinda Carlisle, released in 2007. It was Carlisle's first studio album in over a decade, and is a covers album of "classic French chansons and pop standards", much different from Carlisle's previous English language pop records.

The album was critically praised however did sell moderately. Although all of the songs are sung in French, many of the musicians featured on the album are Irish. The album features keyboard arrangements from Brian Eno.

== Background ==
In an October 2006 press release describing the album, Carlisle said "After I moved to France, I became familiar with the classic French chansons and a lot of French pop music. I realized there was a whole world of artists and singers I was not familiar with. As I discovered all these amazing songs, I came to love this music and wanted to record some of them with a playful, contemporary feel."

Describing how music can transcend any language barrier Carlisle stated, "You don't really have to know what's being sung to know that 'Avec Les Temps' [sic] is a devastating love song. When I heard that song the first time, it broke my heart."

Upon the album's initial release, a limited-edition version was available with a bonus second CD featuring four additional tracks sung in English. Despite the favourable reviews, Allmusic wrote "... not just a rewarding detour but one of her best albums", in the US, the album sold a modest 3,000 copies in its first two weeks.

== Critical reception ==
Professional ratings
Review scores
Source	Rating
AllMusic	4/5 stars
The Boston Phoenix	3/4 stars
Entertainment Weekly	B
Record Collector	3/5 stars
The Times	3/5 stars

Stephen Thomas Erlewine of AllMusic commented that "Carlisle's career has had several twists and turns, but none has been quite as interesting as her 2007 album Voila...it's clear that Voila is no stunt or novelty, it's a passion project for Carlisle and it plays that way: it has the complexity and richness of a labor of love. This is an elegant, stylish collection of adult pop, gliding by on its sleek synth textures and cabaret atmosphere."

Steve Harnell of Classic Pop called it "a radical departure" noting that "world music star Natacha Atlas provides evocative backing vocals on four tracks and Eno’s keyboard textures ensure this slinks along with a contemporary sheen...The cover of Gainsbourg’s "Bonnie Et Clyde", originally sung with Brigitte Bardot no less, particularly impresses with Atlas appearing at the coda. Carlisle’s rarely ventured into torch song territory, but her command of the form is eye-opening. Breathy, and giving full vent to her vibrato, Léo Ferré’s "Avec Le Temps" is a heart-wrenching triumph."

== Track listing ==
No.	Title	Writer(s)	Length
1.	"Ma jeunesse fout le camp"	Guy Bontempelli	3:16
2.	"Bonnie et Clyde"	Serge Gainsbourg	5:15
3.	"Avec le temps"	Léo Ferré	4:06
4.	"Sous le ciel de Paris"	Hubert Giraud; Jean Dréjac	4:42
5.	"Des ronds dans l'eau"	Pierre Barouh; Raymond Lesenechal	2:55
6.	"Pourtant tu m'aimes"	Françoise Hardy; Jimmy Cross; Johnny Cole	3:27
7.	"Ne me quitte pas"	Jacques Brel	3:17
8.	"La Vie en rose"	Édith Piaf; Louis Guglielmi	4:23
9.	"Contact"	Gainsbourg	2:57
10.	"Merci Chérie"	Udo Jürgens; Thomas Horbiger; Baker Cavendish	3:34
11.	"Jezebel"	Wayne Shanklin	3:18

Limited edition bonus disc
No.	Title	Writer(s)	Length
1.	"I Still Love Him"	Jimmy Cross; Johnny Cole	3:26
2.	"La Vie en rose" (English version)	Piaf; Guglielmi; Mack David	4:22
3.	"Bonnie and Clyde"	Gainsbourg	5:14
4.	"If You Go Away"	Brel; Rod McKuen	3:17

== Personnel ==
- Belinda Carlisle – vocals
- Brian Eno – keyboards
- Julian Wilson – keyboards, acoustic piano, Hammond organ, strings
- Graham Henderson – accordion
- Sharon Shannon – button accordion
- Fiachna Ó Braonáin – guitars, vocals, male vocal (2)
- Sagat Guirey – flamenco guitar
- Clare Kenny – bass
- John Reynolds – drums, programming
- Winifred Horan – violins
- Natacha Atlas – additional vocals (1, 2, 5, 8)
- Nicki Leighton-Thomas – backing vocals
- Pauline Scanlon – backing vocals

=== Production ===
- David Jaymes Associates, Ltd. – executive producers
- John Reynolds – producer, engineer, mixing
- Alan Branch – engineer, mixing
- Tim Oliver – engineer
- Maureen O'Donnell – album coordinator
- Martin "Cally" Callomon – art direction
- Jill Furmanovsky – photography
- Lorraine Kinman – stylist
- Lee Radley – hair
- Sara Raeburn – make-up
- Simon Watson – management
- Sidewinder Management – management
- Nicola Russell-Cross – French language tutor
- Fiachna O'Braonain – French vocal coach
