= Circle in the Sand =

1988 single by Belinda Carlisle

Single by Belinda Carlisle

from the album Heaven on Earth
- B-side: "We Can Change"
- Released: April 1988
- Studio: Ocean Way Recording (Hollywood, California)
- Length: 4:27 (album version); 3:44 (single version)
- Label: MCA
- Songwriters: Rick Nowels; Ellen Shipley
- Producer: Rick Nowels

Belinda Carlisle singles chronology
"I Get Weak" (1988)	"Circle in the Sand" (1988)	"I Feel Free" (1988)

"Circle in the Sand" is a song by American singer Belinda Carlisle from her second studio album, Heaven on Earth (1987). The song was written by Rick Nowels, who also produced it, and Ellen Shipley. "Circle in the Sand" was the third single released from Heaven on Earth in April 1988. It reached number seven on the US Billboard Hot 100 chart, becoming Carlisle's fourth top-10 hit in the United States. It also charted at number five in Canada, ending the year as the country's 69th-most successful single.

== Background and writing ==
"Circle in the Sand" was written by Rick Nowels and Ellen Shipley, who wrote many of Carlisle's hit singles in the late 1980s and into the early 1990s, including her signature song "Heaven Is a Place on Earth". The first known appearance of the song in progress is from the Lost Heaven Demos bootleg. The final album version features a keyboard theme provided by Thomas Dolby.

== Music video ==
The accompanying music video for the song was directed by Peter Care in Half Moon Bay, California, and features Carlisle singing with various beach scenes in the background. The video mirrors the lyrical content with "cold wind", "tide moves in", and "waves crash" throughout. It makes effective use of video editing effects by displaying different images of Carlisle and the surf on large sheets of paper hanging on a clothes line, with waves crashing in the background. The combined effect gives the semblance of a video-based collage.

The music video uses the single edit version of the song and was released by MCA Records in March 1988. Universal Records later posted the video for free viewing on YouTube in March 2007.

== Track listing and formats ==
- US and Canadian 7-inch single; US cassette single
1. "Circle in the Sand"
2. "We Can Change"
- South African 7-inch single

A. "Circle in the Sand" – 4:26
B. "Nobody Owns Me" – 3:12

- International 7-inch single

A. "Circle in the Sand" – 3:20
B. "Circle in the Sand" (Seaside Mood Groove mix) – 3:51

- 12-inch single

A1. "Circle in the Sand" (Beach Party mix) – 7:50
B1. "Circle in the Sand" (7-inch version) – 3:20
B2. "Circle in the Sand" (Seaside Mood Groove mix) – 3:51
- A 12-inch picture disc was also issued in the UK.

- UK CD single
1. "Circle in the Sand" (7-inch version)
2. "Circle in the Sand" (Seaside Mood Groove mix)
3. "Circle in the Sand" (Sandblast multi-mix) (including "Heaven Is a Place on Earth" and "I Get Weak")
4. "Circle in the Sand" (Beach Party mix)
- UK cassette single
1. "Circle in the Sand" (7-inch version) – 3:20
2. "Circle in the Sand" (Sandblast multi-mix) (including "Heaven Is a Place on Earth" and "I Get Weak") – 5:00
3. "Heaven Is a Place on Earth" – 3:49
- Japanese mini-CD single
1. "Circle in the Sand"
2. "Circle in the Sand" (Beach Party mix)
3. "Circle in the Sand" (Sandblast multi-mix) (including "Heaven Is a Place on Earth" and "I Get Weak")

== Personnel ==
- Belinda Carlisle – lead vocals
- Charles Judge – keyboards, drum programming
- John McCurry – electric guitars
- Thomas Dolby – keyboards
- John Pierce – bass
- Rick Nowels – keyboards, drum programming

== Charts ==
=== Weekly charts ===
Weekly chart performance for "Circle in the Sand"
Chart (1988)	Peak position
Australia (Australian Music Report)	75
Austria (Ö3 Austria Top 40)	26
Belgium (Ultratop 50 Flanders)	13
Canada Top Singles (RPM)	5
Canada Adult Contemporary (RPM)	3
Denmark (Hitlisten)	4
Europe (Eurochart Hot 100 Singles)	13
European Airplay (European Hit Radio)	2
Finland (Suomen virallinen lista)	6
Ireland (IRMA)	6
Israel (Israeli Singles Chart)	5
Luxembourg (Radio Luxembourg)	2
Netherlands (Dutch Top 40)	17
Netherlands (Single Top 100)	22
New Zealand (Recorded Music NZ)	16
Panama (UPI)	6
Quebec (ADISQ)	3
South Africa (Springbok Radio)	12
Sweden (Trackslistan)	4
UK Singles (Official Charts)	4
US Billboard Hot 100	7
US Adult Contemporary (Billboard)	5
US Cash Box Top 100 Singles	7
West Germany (GfK)	9

=== Year-end charts ===
Year-end chart performance for "Circle in the Sand"
Chart (1988)	Position
Canada Top Singles (RPM)	69
US (Joel Whitburn's Pop Annual)	94

== Release history ==
Release dates and formats for "Circle in the Sand"
Region	Date	Format(s)	Label(s)	Ref.
United States	April 1988	7-inch vinyl; cassette	MCA	
United Kingdom	April 25, 1988	7-inch vinyl; 12-inch vinyl	Virgin	
Japan	July 21, 1988	Mini-CD	Virgin	
