= California (Belinda Carlisle song) =

Single by Belinda Carlisle

from the album A Woman & a Man
- Released: February 17, 1997
- Studio: The Journey Room (Malibu, California)
- Length: 2:59
- Label: Chrysalis Records
- Songwriters: Rick Nowels; Billy Steinberg; Maria Vidal
- Producer: David Tickle

Belinda Carlisle singles chronology
"Love in the Key of C" (1996)	"California" (1997)	"I Won't Say (I'm in Love)" (1997)

"California" is a song written by Rick Nowels, Billy Steinberg and Maria Vidal, produced by David Tickle for American singer Belinda Carlisle's sixth studio album, A Woman & a Man (1996). It was released in February 1997 by Chrysalis Records as the album's fourth single in the UK and the third single in Australia. The accompanying music video was directed by Philippe Gautier.

== Critical reception ==
British magazine Music Week rated the song three out of five, adding, "This cool, smooth ditty is quite a grower, although the production seems a little too stark."

== Track listing ==
- Australian CD single
1. "California"
2. "In Too Deep" (acoustic)
3. "Circle in the Sand" (acoustic)
- UK CD single 1
1. "California"
2. "Leave a Light On" (live)
3. "Live Your Life Be Free" (live)
4. "Heaven Is a Place on Earth" (live)
- UK CD single 2
1. "California"
2. "Big Scary Animal" (live)
3. "I Get Weak" (live)
4. "In Too Deep" (live)

== Personnel ==
- Produced and mixed by David Tickle
- Guitar by Phil Grande
- Bass guitar by Nick Beggs
- Drums by Steve Wren
- Keyboards by Rory Kaplan
- Percussion by Paulinho Da Costa
- Background vocals by Brian Wilson

== Charts ==
Chart (1997)	Peak position
Australia (ARIA)	199
Europe (Eurochart Hot 100)	81
Finland (Suomen virallinen lista)	25
Scotland Singles (Official Charts)	28
UK Singles (Official Charts)	31
