= Heaven on Earth (Belinda Carlisle album) =

Studio album by Belinda Carlisle
- Released: October 5, 1987
- Studios: Ocean Way (Hollywood); American Recording (Calabasas, California); Music Grinder (Hollywood) (Note: Additional recording); Hollywood Sound (Hollywood); Cherokee (Hollywood)
- Genre: Pop rock
- Length: 43:24
- Labels: MCA; Virgin
- Producer: Rick Nowels

Belinda Carlisle chronology
Belinda (1986)	Heaven on Earth (1987)	Runaway Horses (1989)

Singles from Heaven on Earth
- 1. "Heaven Is a Place on Earth" Released: September 14, 1987 (US); 2. "I Get Weak" Released: January 1988 (US); 3. "Circle in the Sand" Released: April 1988 (US); 4. "I Feel Free" Released: July 1988 (US); 5. "World Without You" Released: August 1988 (UK); 6. "Love Never Dies" Released: November 1988 (UK)

Heaven on Earth is the second solo studio album by American singer Belinda Carlisle. It was released on October 5, 1987, by MCA Records in North America and Virgin Records globally. Three singles reached the top 10 of the US Billboard Hot 100, including the number-one single and Carlisle's signature song "Heaven Is a Place on Earth". The album has been certified Platinum in several countries, including the United States, and triple Platinum in the United Kingdom

== Singles ==
The first single released, "Heaven Is a Place on Earth", reached the number one position throughout the world. The second single released was "I Get Weak", written by Diane Warren. "I Get Weak" reached the number two spot in the US and garnered a top 10 placing in Canada and the UK. The third single, "Circle in the Sand", reached the top 10 in many countries, among them the UK (number four), the US (number seven) and Canada (number five). From the fourth single on, the singles released from the album varied in different territories. The Cream cover "I Feel Free" was released only in the US, reaching number 88 on the Billboard Hot 100. This was the final US single from the album. In Europe, "World Without You", another Diane Warren composition, was released, where it reached the top 40. A fifth and final single in the UK was the ballad "Love Never Dies", which reached number 54.

== Reissues ==
In May 2009, Heaven on Earth was reissued as a remastered two-disc special edition with several bonus remixes and a DVD. The DVD's concert footage previously was available only on VHS.

Heaven on Earth was reissued on August 26, 2013, in a 2CD+DVD casebook edition from Edsel Records (EDSG 8025) with the original album remastered, single versions, remixes and B-sides. The DVD features the videos from the album, concert footage filmed in Philadelphia during the 1988 "Good Heavens" world tour, and an exclusive interview with Carlisle, discussing the album.

== Critical reception ==
Professional ratings
Review scores
Source	Rating
AllMusic	4/5 stars
The Daily Vault	B−
Mojo	4/5 stars
NME	4/10
Record Collector	3/5 stars

Reviewing Heaven on Earth, Cashbox commented, "Carlisle bursts out of the box with her second solo LP. Here she attacks a variety of styles, from the haunting 'Circle in the Sand' to an appropriately psychedelic remake of Cream's 'I Feel Free' to the prime pop of 'Should I Let You In?' Established name should fly at retail, while slick grooves are radio-ready." Billboard, however, was unimpressed: "The transmogrification from Go-Go to no-no is complete. 'Heaven Is a Place on Earth' has caught the public's ear, but only 'Circle in the Sand' has any of the exuberant character that propelled 'Mad About You,' the saving grace of Carlisle's solo debut. New, big-time label affiliation will help."

Retrospectively, Steve Harnell of Classic Pop wrote, "Everything about Heaven on Earth oozes confidence. The album is front-loaded with killer tracks but even lesser cuts mark Carlisle out as a force to be reckoned with ... Key to the success of the new album were the songwriting chops of Rick Nowels whose gutsy pop-rockers wrung every last drop of emotion out of Carlisle, who was now making the most of her sexy vibrato." AllMusic's Alex Henderson found that "while nothing here packs quite the punch that 'How Much More,' 'We Got the Beat,' and 'Turn to You' did, such memorable songs as 'Heaven Is a Place on Earth,' 'Should I Let You In?', and 'I Get Weak' show that the Angeleno still had plenty of spirit."

== Track listing ==
No.	Title	Writer(s)	Length
1.	"Heaven Is a Place on Earth"	Rick Nowels; Ellen Shipley	4:05
2.	"Circle in the Sand"	Nowels; Shipley	4:26
3.	"I Feel Free"	Jack Bruce; Pete Brown	4:49
4.	"Should I Let You In?"	Charlotte Caffey; Mark Holden	4:15
5.	"World Without You"	Diane Warren	4:42
6.	"I Get Weak"	Warren	4:50
7.	"We Can Change"	Nowels; C. Caffey	3:45
8.	"Fool for Love"	Robbie Seidman	3:57
9.	"Nobody Owns Me"	C. Caffey; Holden; Clyde Lieberman	3:12
10.	"Love Never Dies"	C. Caffey; Tom Caffey; Nowels	5:16

== Personnel ==
Credits adapted from the liner notes of Heaven on Earth in 1987 and 2013.

=== Musicians ===
- Belinda Carlisle – vocals, air guitars
- Charles Judge – keyboards, acoustic piano, drum programming
- Rick Nowels – keyboards, acoustic guitars, electric guitars, drum programming, backing vocals
- Rhett Lawrence – Fairlight CMI
- Thomas Dolby – additional keyboards
- Dann Huff – electric guitars
- John McCurry – electric guitars
- George Black – additional guitars
- Michael Landau – additional guitars
- Tim Pierce – additional guitars
- Brian Setzer – additional guitars
- John Pierce – bass
- Kenny Aronoff – drums
- Curly Smith – drums
- Jimmy Bralower – percussion
- Paulinho da Costa – percussion
- David Kemper – percussion
- Beth Anderson – backing vocals
- Charlotte Caffey – backing vocals
- Donna Davidson – backing vocals
- Donna De Lory – backing vocals
- Edie Lehmann – backing vocals
- Chynna Phillips – backing vocals
- Michelle Phillips – backing vocals
- Ellen Shipley – backing vocals
- Amy Sky – backing vocals
- Carnie Wilson – backing vocals

=== Production and Technical ===
- Rick Nowels – producer, arrangements
- Steve MacMillan – recording, mixing (tracks 3, 4, 8, 10)
- Stacy Baird – additional engineer
- Robert Feist – additional engineer
- Shelly Yakus – mixing (tracks 1, 2, 5–7, 9)
- Charles Judge – mix assistant
- Marc DeSisto – assistant engineer
- Matthew Freeman – assistant engineer, production assistant
- Clark Germain – assistant engineer
- Rob Jacobs – assistant engineer
- Ethan Jones – assistant engineer
- Brian Scheuble – assistant engineer
- Joe Schiff – assistant engineer
- Bob Vogt – assistant engineer
- Stephen Marcussen – mastering at Precision Lacquer (Hollywood, California)
- Ellen Shipley – additional vocal production
- Robert Feist – additional vocal production
- Timothy McDaniel – production coordination
- Nancy Del Los Santos – production assistance

=== Artwork ===
- Phillip Dixon – photography
- Norman Moore – art direction, design

== Charts ==
=== Weekly charts ===
Weekly chart performance for Heaven on Earth
Chart (1988)	Peak position
Australian Albums (Australian Music Report)	13
Canada Top Albums/CDs (RPM)	12
Dutch Albums (Album Top 100)	31
European Albums (Music & Media)	10
Finnish Albums (Suomen virallinen lista)	11
German Albums (Offizielle Top 100)	17
Italian Albums (Musica e dischi)	18
Japanese Albums (Oricon)	21
New Zealand Albums (RMNZ)	3
Norwegian Albums (VG-lista)	1
Swedish Albums (Sverigetopplistan)	3
Swiss Albums (Schweizer Hitparade)	4
UK Albums (Official Charts)	4
US Billboard 200	13
US Cash Box Top 100 Albums	19

=== Year-end chart ===
Year-end chart performance for Heaven on Earth
Chart (1988)	Position
Australian Albums (Australian Music Report)	94
Canada Top Albums/CDs (RPM)	38
European Albums (Music & Media)	25
Norwegian Winter Period Albums (VG-lista)	4
Swiss Albums (Schweizer Hitparade)	20
UK Albums (Gallup)	20
US Billboard 200	17

== Certifications ==
Certifications for Heaven on Earth
Region	Certification	Certified units/sales
Canada (Music Canada)	2× Platinum	200,000^{^}
Hong Kong (IFPI Hong Kong)	Gold	10,000^{*}
New Zealand (RMNZ)	Platinum	15,000^{^}
Switzerland (IFPI Switzerland)	Gold	25,000^{^}
United Kingdom (BPI)	3× Platinum	900,000^{^}
United States (RIAA)	Platinum	1,000,000^{^}
^{*} Sales figures based on certification alone.^{^} Shipments figures based on certification alone.
