= A Woman & a Man =

Studio album by Belinda Carlisle
- Released: September 11, 1996
- Studios: The Journey Room; (Malibu, California)
- Genre: Pop
- Length: 43:14
- Labels: Chrysalis (UK/Australia); EMI (Japan); Ark 21 (U.S.)
- Producers: David Tickle; Per Gessle and Clarence Öfwerman (track 6)

Belinda Carlisle chronology
Real (1993)	A Woman & a Man (1996)	A Place on Earth: The Greatest Hits (1999)

Singles from A Woman & a Man
- 1. "In Too Deep" Released: July 1, 1996; 2. "Always Breaking My Heart" Released: September 9, 1996; 3. "Love in the Key of C" Released: November 18, 1996; 4. "California" Released: February 17, 1997

A Woman & a Man is the sixth album by the American singer Belinda Carlisle, released in the United Kingdom on September 23, 1996, by Chrysalis Records (then part of the EMI Group, like Carlisle's former label Virgin Records). The album contains songs written by Rick Nowels, Maria Vidal, Ellen Shipley, Charlotte Caffey, Neil Finn and Roxette co-founder Per Gessle who also produced one of the tracks.

It was released in the United States in 1997 on the Ark 21 Records label. There was a special DTS (surround sound) version released with a slightly different track listing compared to the original; it did not include "Listen to Love", "Love Doesn't Live Here" and "Always Breaking My Heart" but instead had Carlisle singing "Jealous Guy" by John Lennon and "The Ballad of Lucy Jordan" by Shel Silverstein.

== Reception ==
=== Critical reception ===
Professional ratings
Review scores
Source	Rating
AllMusic	4/5 stars
Entertainment Weekly	C−
The Guardian	2/5 stars
Music Week	4/5 stars

The album received mixed reviews. Allmusic's Stephen Thomas Erlewine rated the album four stars out of five saying it is a "mature collection of adult pop, with cool keyboards and subtle arrangements that often make the record sound like background music". However, he also noted that "Carlisle has rarely been in better voice". Entertainment Weekly's Steven Mirkin gave the album C− saying that "Carlisle has neither the voice nor personality to overcome her album's cold, emotionally sterile core."

Music & Media called it a "brilliant album", noting that "added to her west coast pop sound are a melancholic savoir faire and contemporary electronic beats. The best example is the unforgettable "California", which is a mid-tempo declaration of hate to Los Angeles ("I want to walk away from the sharks and the Chardonnay") with spine-chilling harmonies and beautiful melodies. The album's title track is a little faster, an excellent single candidate, which has a highly addictive driving rhythm, whirling strings, a wah wah disco guitar and poppy vocals. Go Go fans will be happy with the '60s bubblegum sound of "Always Breaking My Heart"."

Retrospectively, in 2020, Steve Harnell of Classic Pop called it "a rather too-polished collection of adult-oriented pop...Belinda impresses on the sophisticated ballad "In Too Deep" and Northern Soul stomper title track. Roxette's Per Gessle supplies two songs, the superior cut being the rocking "Always Breaking My Heart" with its huge chorus. But wispy ballads like the MOR "Remember September" and the gloopy "My Heart Goes Out To You" feel like phoned-in performances from the usually committed Carlisle."

=== Commercial reception ===
The album entered the UK Albums Chart at No. 12. It outsold Carlisle's previous album, Real, and was certified Gold by BPI for sales in excess of 100,000 copies. The album revived Carlisle's career in the singles chart – producing three top twenty hits (two of them top ten). It was released in the US but failed to chart on the Billboard 200 album chart with a total sales of 17,000 copies.

The album charted on the Australian ARIA Albums Chart on November 11, 1996, at No. 31 with only one single released to radio at the time. It only spent ten weeks in the top one hundred making the album her last charting album on the charts. It was Carlisle's last album to chart in Austria, peaking at No. 36 and stayed in the charts for two weeks. It was Carlisle's lowest charting album in Sweden, peaking at No. 44 and only spending one week in the charts. In Italy, the album peaked at No. 35.

The singles had some success in various countries. "In Too Deep" was the first song released from the album and became a top ten hit in the UK and a top twenty in Australia. "Always Breaking My Heart", written and produced by Per Gessle of Roxette, was the second song released from the album; it also reached the top ten in the UK. "Love in the Key of C", the third song released, became Carlisle's tenth top twenty UK hit. The fourth single, "California", was Carlisle's final UK Top 40 hit.

== Track listing ==
No.	Title	Writer(s)	Length
1.	"In Too Deep"	Rick Nowels	4:05
2.	"California"	Rick Nowels, Billy Steinberg, María Vidal	2:59
3.	"A Woman and a Man"	Robbie Seidman, María Vidal	5:12
4.	"Remember September"	Rick Nowels, Ellen Shipley	4:32
5.	"Listen to Love"	Christopher García, John Ingoldby, Ralph McCarthy	4:09
6.	"Always Breaking My Heart"	Per Gessle	3:12
7.	"Love Doesn't Live Here"	Per Gessle	4:09
8.	"He Goes On"	Neil Finn	3:13
9.	"Kneel at Your Feet"	Charlotte Caffey, Tom Caffey, Belinda Carlisle	4:18
10.	"Love in the Key of C"	Rick Nowels	3:50
11.	"My Heart Goes Out to You"	Anders Bagge, Rick Nowels, Allen Rich	3:35

Japanese bonus tracks
No.	Title	Writer(s)	Length
12.	"The Ballad of Lucy Jordan"	Shel Silverstein	3:50
13.	"Love Walks In"	Charlotte Caffey, Tom Caffey	3:19

=== American DTS (Surround Sound) version ===
(The regular American version had the same track listing as the UK version)

No.	Title	Writer(s)	Length
1.	"In Too Deep"	Rick Nowels	4:08
2.	"California"	Rick Nowels, Billy Steinberg, María Vidal	2:56
3.	"A Woman and a Man"	Robbie Seidman, María Vidal	5:10
4.	"Jealous Guy"	John Lennon	4:07
5.	"Remember September"	Rick Nowels, Ellen Shipley	4:21
6.	"He Goes On"	Neil Finn	3:12
7.	"Kneel at Your Feet"	Charlotte Caffey, Tom Caffey, Belinda Carlisle	4:25
8.	"Love in the Key of C"	Rick Nowels	3:59
9.	"My Heart Goes Out to You"	Anders Bagge, Rick Nowels, Allen Rich	3:24
10.	"The Ballad of Lucy Jordan"	Shel Silverstein	3:50

== Personnel ==
- Belinda Carlisle – vocals, backing vocals (6, 9)
- Rory Kaplan – keyboards (1–5, 7–11), acoustic piano (4, 8), drum programming (10)
- Red Young – Hammond organ (5)
- Clarence Öfwerman – keyboards (6), programming (6)
- Phil Grande – guitars (1, 2)
- Davey Johnstone – mandolin (1)
- Louis Metoyer – guitars (3, 5, 9), acoustic guitar (4), electric guitar (4)
- Chrissie Schefts – guitars (5, 10), electric sitar (10)
- Per Gessle – electric guitar (6), backing vocals (6)
- Jonas Isacsson – acoustic guitar (6), electric guitar (6)
- Steve Farris – acoustic guitar (7, 8, 11), electric guitar (7, 8)
- Nick Beggs – bass guitar (1–5, 7, 8, 10), Chapman stick (4, 9, 11)
- Andres Herrlin – bass guitar (6), programming (6)
- Steve Wren – drums (1–5, 7–11)
- Paulinho da Costa – percussion (1–5, 8–10)
- Caroline Dale – string arrangements (3, 10)
- Andy Brown – conductor (3, 10)
- David Sabee – string coordinator (3, 10)
- Northwest Sinfonia – strings (3, 10)
- Ellen Shipley – backing vocals (1, 3–5, 7–10)
- Maria Vidal – backing vocals (1, 3–5, 7–11)
- Brian Wilson – backing vocals (2)
- Susanna Hoffs – backing vocals (11)

=== Production ===
- Executive producer – J. F. Cecillon
- Producers – David Tickle (Tracks 1–5 & 7–11); Per Gessle and Clarence Öfwerman (Track 6).
- Recorded and mixed by David Tickle
- Assistant engineers – Brian Lapin and Randy Wine
- Design – Stylorouge
- Inside photography – Lorenzo Agius and Ellen Von Unwerth
- Front cover photo – Ellen Von Unwerth
- Management – Miles Copeland III and Simon Watson

== Charts ==
Chart performance for A Woman & a Man
Chart (1996)	Peak position
Australian Albums (ARIA)	31
Austrian Albums (Ö3 Austria)	36
European Albums (Music & Media)	36
Italian Albums (FIMI)	35
Japanese Albums (Oricon)	34
Swedish Albums (Sverigetopplistan)	44
UK Albums (Official Charts)	12
Scottish Albums (Official Charts)	13

== Certifications and sales ==
Certifications and sales for A Woman & a Man
Region	Certification	Certified units/sales
United Kingdom (BPI)	Gold	100,000^{^}
United States	—	17,000
^{^} Shipments figures based on certification alone.

== Release history ==
Region	Date	Label	Format	Catalog
Japan	September 11, 1996	EMI	CD	TOCP-50002
United Kingdom	September 23, 1996	Chrysalis Records	CD	724385354526
Australia	October 16, 1996	Chrysalis Records	CD	853545-2
