= World Without You =

1988 single by Belinda Carlisle

Single by Belinda Carlisle

from the album Heaven on Earth
- B-side: "Nobody Owns Me"
- Released: August 30, 1988
- Label: Virgin
- Songwriter: Diane Warren
- Producer: Rick Nowels

Belinda Carlisle singles chronology
"I Feel Free" (1988)	"World Without You" (1988)	"Love Never Dies" (1988)

"World Without You" is a song by American musician and singer Belinda Carlisle, released in August 1988 by Virgin Records as the fifth single from her second album, Heaven on Earth (1987). The song was written by Diane Warren and produced by Rick Nowels. It peaked at number 34 on the UK Singles Chart and number 21 in Ireland. A music video using concert footage was produced to promote the single.

== Critical reception ==
Paul Mathur from Melody Maker said, "She polishes off this song like she's kissing a peach and while it never exactly lingers more than a couple of seconds, there's enough silky soppiness to turn me to temperance." Pan-European magazine Music & Media wrote, "Shirelles meet Richard Marx in this definitively radio-friendly number." Stuart Maconie from NME commented, "'World Without You' is so seamless and clean it hurts. I love it. Like The World Trade Center, it is beyond criticism. It just exists."

== Track listings ==
1. "World Without You" (extended worldwide mix)
2. "World Without You" (7-inch remix)
3. "Nobody Owns Me" (album version)

== Charts ==
Chart (1988)	Peak position
Europe (Eurochart Hot 100)	99
Ireland (IRMA)	21
UK Singles (OCC)	34

== Release history ==
Region	Date	Format(s)	Label(s)	Ref.
United Kingdom	August 30, 1988	7-inch vinyl; 12-inch vinyl; CD	Virgin	
Japan	October 21, 1988	Mini-CD	Virgin	
