= I Get Weak =

1988 single by Belinda Carlisle

Single by Belinda Carlisle

from the album Heaven on Earth
- B-side: "Should I Let You In?"
- Released: January 1988
- Studio: Ocean Way (Hollywood, California)
- Length: 4:52 (album version); 4:20 (single edit)
- Label: MCA
- Songwriter: Diane Warren
- Producer: Rick Nowels

Belinda Carlisle singles chronology
"Heaven Is a Place on Earth" (1987)	"I Get Weak" (1988)	"Circle in the Sand" (1988)

"I Get Weak" is a song by American singer Belinda Carlisle from her second studio album, Heaven on Earth (1987). Written by Diane Warren and produced by Rick Nowels, the song was released as the second single from Heaven on Earth in January 1988. "I Get Weak" reached number two on the US Billboard Hot 100, number four on Canada's RPM 100 Singles chart, and number 10 on the UK Singles Chart.

== Background ==
After completing the song, songwriter Diane Warren "initially had Stevie Nicks in mind – a suggestion she made to producer Rick Nowels, who felt it would be a better fit for Carlisle."

== Critical reception ==
Jerry Smith of Music Week called "I Get Weak" a "smooth and rather sanitised track" which "will need plenty of support if it's to make much impression".

== Music video ==
The accompanying music video for the song features a combination of color and black-and-white shots in the same frames. It was directed by actress Diane Keaton (who also directed her previous "Heaven Is a Place on Earth" video), and featured model and actor Tony Ward, who later appeared in Madonna's video for "Justify My Love".

== Track listings ==
7-inch and US cassette single

1. "I Get Weak" – 3:58
2. "Should I Let You In?" – 4:15

12-inch and UK cassette single

1. "I Get Weak" (12-inch version) – 7:25
2. "I Get Weak" (7-inch version) – 4:39
3. "I Get Weak" (instrumental version) – 7:32

UK CD single

1. "I Get Weak" (7-inch version)
2. "Should I Let You In?"
3. "I Get Weak" (12-inch version)

Australian cassette single

A1. "I Get Weak"
A2. "Should I Let You In?"
B1. "I Get Weak" (12-inch version)
A2. "Should I Let You In?"

Japanese mini-CD single

1. "I Get Weak"
2. "Heaven Is a Place on Earth" (extended mix)
3. "I Get Weak" (extended mix)
4. "Heaven Is a Place on Earth"

== Charts ==
=== Weekly charts ===
Weekly chart performance for "I Get Weak"
Chart (1988)	Peak position
Australia (Australian Music Report)	34
Canada Top Singles (RPM)	4
Canada Adult Contemporary (RPM)	14
Europe (Eurochart Hot 100 Singles)	33
European Airplay (Music & Media)	4
Finland (Suomen virallinen lista)	25
Ireland (IRMA)	5
Israel (Israeli Singles Chart)	23
Italy (Musica e dischi)	16
Luxembourg (Radio Luxembourg)	7
Netherlands (Single Top 100)	77
New Zealand (Recorded Music NZ)	11
Quebec (ADISQ)	4
South Africa (Springbok Radio)	14
Switzerland (Schweizer Hitparade)	24
UK Singles (Official Charts)	10
US Billboard Hot 100	2
US Adult Contemporary (Billboard)	9
US Cash Box Top 100 Singles	3
West Germany (GfK)	38

=== Year-end charts ===
Year-end chart performance for "I Get Weak"
Chart (1988)	Position
Canada Top Singles (RPM)	57
US Billboard Hot 100	57
US Cash Box Top 100 Singles	35

== Release history ==
Release dates and formats for "I Get Weak"
Region	Date	Format(s)	Label(s)	Ref.
United States	January 1988	7-inch vinyl; 12-inch vinyl; cassette	MCA	
United Kingdom	February 15, 1988	7-inch vinyl; 12-inch vinyl	Virgin	
Japan	April 21, 1988	Mini-CD	Virgin	
