= Heaven Is a Place on Earth =

1987 single by Belinda Carlisle

Single by Belinda Carlisle

from the album Heaven on Earth
- B-side: "We Can Change"
- Released: September 14, 1987
- Studio: Ocean Way (Hollywood)
- Genre: Power pop; pop rock; synth-rock
- Length: 4:06 (album version); 3:53 (radio edit/7-inch); 5:59 (The Heavenly version/12-inch)
- Label: MCA
- Songwriters: Rick Nowels; Ellen Shipley
- Producer: Rick Nowels

Belinda Carlisle singles chronology
"Dancing in the City" (1987)	"Heaven Is a Place on Earth" (1987)	"I Get Weak" (1988)

Music video
- Belinda Carlisle - Heaven Is A Place On Earth (Official HD Music Video) on YouTube

"Heaven Is a Place on Earth" is a single by American singer Belinda Carlisle from her second studio album, Heaven on Earth (1987). Written by Rick Nowels and Ellen Shipley, the song was released as the lead single from the album on September 14, 1987, and it reached number one on the US Billboard Hot 100 on December 5, 1987, becoming Carlisle's first and only US chart-topper. A month later, it peaked at number one in the United Kingdom, where it held the top spot of the UK Singles Chart for two weeks. In Australia, it peaked at number 2. It is considered to be Carlisle's signature song.

The song was nominated for the Grammy Award for Best Female Pop Vocal Performance in 1988, but lost out to Whitney Houston's "I Wanna Dance with Somebody (Who Loves Me)". In 2017, ShortList's Dave Fawbert listed the song as containing "one of the greatest key changes in music history".

In 2015, Carlisle re-recorded the song as an acoustic ballad. This version appeared on her album Wilder Shores (2017), which combines acoustic tracks with world beats and traditional Sikh chants.

== Composition ==
Sheet music for "Heaven Is a Place on Earth" sets the key of E major (D major for the pre-chorus), with a tempo of 123 beats per minute in common time (sheet music originally published in the key of A major). Carlisle's vocals span from E_{3} to D♯_{5}. During the final chorus of the song, the key modulates to F♯ major.

== Production ==
Carlisle's backup vocalists on the song include songwriters Nowels and Shipley as well as Michelle Phillips of The Mamas & the Papas, Chynna Phillips of Wilson Phillips, and songwriter Diane Warren. It also features Thomas Dolby on synthesizers.

== Critical reception ==
A review in Pan-European magazine Music & Media described "Heaven Is a Place on Earth" as being "a truly uplifting song, sporting an enjoyable and irresistible chorus". Jerry Smith of British magazine Music Week deemed the song a "glossy, and ultimately very commercial, number", and a potential hit. Reviewing the song in 2021, Tom Breihan of Stereogum described the track as a "simple, straightforward love song built around terms so overstated that they cross over into actual religious territory,” awarding it a score of 7 out of 10.

== Chart performance ==
"Heaven Is a Place on Earth" reached number one on the US Billboard Hot 100 and number seven on the Adult Contemporary chart. It was also a number-one hit in the United Kingdom, topping the UK Singles Chart for two weeks. The single also reached number one in many other countries, among them Switzerland, Ireland, Zimbabwe, Sweden, South Africa and Norway. It also reached number three in Germany and Canada, number two in Australia, and number six in Italy. It reached gold status in Canada and platinum status in the United Kingdom.

== Music video ==
The promotional music video for the song was directed by actress Diane Keaton. It includes an appearance by Carlisle's husband Morgan Mason. It features children wearing black masks and capes, and holding illuminated plastic globes. Carlisle appears wearing a strapless dress and later changes to a black off-the-shoulder blouse. The video was partially filmed at Six Flags Magic Mountain theme park in Valencia, California (now Santa Clarita, California), on the now-defunct Spin Out ride.

== Track listings ==
7-inch and cassette single

1. "Heaven Is a Place on Earth" – 3:49
2. "We Can Change" – 3:45

US and Canadian 12-inch single

A1. "Heaven Is a Place on Earth" (The Heavenly version) – 5:59
B1. "Heaven Is a Place on Earth" (Down the Earth dub) – 5:25
B2. "Heaven Is a Place on Earth" (The Voice) – 3:51

UK, European, and Australian 12-inch single

A1. "Heaven Is a Place on Earth" (Heavenly version) – 5:59
B1. "Heaven Is a Place on Earth" – 3:49
B2. "We Can Change" – 3:45

Japanese 12-inch single

A1. "Heaven Is a Place on Earth" (Heavenly version)
B1. "We Can Change"
B2. "Heaven Is a Place on Earth"

UK CD single

1. "Heaven Is a Place on Earth"
2. "We Can Change"
3. "Heaven Is a Place on Earth" (Heavenly version)
4. "Heaven Is a Place on Earth" (a cappella version)

Australian cassette single

A1. "Heaven Is a Place on Earth"
A2. "We Can Change"
A3. "Heaven Is a Place on Earth"
B1. "We Can Change"
B2. "Heaven Is a Place on Earth" (Heavenly version)

== Charts ==
=== Weekly charts ===
1987–1988 weekly chart performance
Chart (1987–1988)	Peak position
Australia (Australian Music Report)	2
Austria (Ö3 Austria Top 40)	10
Belgium (Ultratop 50 Flanders)	3
Canada (The Record)	6
Canada Top Singles (RPM)	3
Canada Adult Contemporary (RPM)	5
Denmark (Tracklisten)	3
Europe (European Hot 100 Singles)	1
European Airplay (European Hit Radio)	1
Finland (Suomen virallinen lista)	3
France (IFOP)	58
Iceland (Íslenski Listinn Topp 10)	7
Ireland (IRMA)	1
Israel (Israeli Singles Chart)	1
Italy (Musica e dischi)	6
Italy Airplay (Music & Media)	9
Luxembourg (Radio Luxembourg)	3
Netherlands (Dutch Top 40)	7
Netherlands (Single Top 100)	7
New Zealand (Recorded Music NZ)	1
Norway (VG-lista)	1
Portugal (AFYVE)	2
Quebec (ADISQ)	4
South Africa (Springbok Radio)	1
Spain (AFYVE)	10
Sweden (Sverigetopplistan)	1
Switzerland (Schweizer Hitparade)	1
UK Singles (Official Charts)	1
US Billboard Hot 100	1
US Adult Contemporary (Billboard)	7
US Cash Box Top 100	1
West Germany (GfK)	3
Zimbabwe (ZIMA)	1

2025 weekly chart performance
Chart (2025)	Peak position
Poland (Polish Airplay Top 100)	44

=== Year-end charts ===
1987 year-end chart performance
Chart (1987)	Position
Canada Top Singles (RPM)	36

1988 year-end chart performance
Chart (1988)	Position
Australia (ARIA)	11
Belgium (Ultratop 50 Flanders)	30
Canada Top Singles (RPM)	99
Europe (European Hot 100 Singles)	22
Europe (European Airplay Top 50)	16
Netherlands (Dutch Top 40)	61
Netherlands (Single Top 100)	81
New Zealand (RIANZ)	9
South Africa (Springbok Radio)	4
Switzerland (Schweizer Hitparade)	8
UK Singles (Gallup)	17
US Billboard Hot 100	7
West Germany (Media Control)	38

1985–1989 chart performance
Chart (1985–1989)	Position
Europe (European Hot 100 Singles)	94

== Certifications ==
Certifications
Region	Certification	Certified units/sales
Canada (Music Canada)	Gold	50,000^{^}
Denmark (IFPI Danmark)	Platinum	90,000^{‡}
Italy (FIMI) sales since 2009	Gold	50,000^{‡}
New Zealand (RMNZ)	3× Platinum	90,000^{‡}
Spain (Promusicae)	Gold	30,000^{‡}
United Kingdom (BPI) original physical release	Silver	250,000^{^}
United Kingdom (BPI) digital release	2× Platinum	1,200,000^{‡}
^{^} Shipments figures based on certification alone.^{‡} Sales+streaming figures based on certification alone.

== In popular culture ==
The song appears in Romy and Michele's High School Reunion (1997), Harold and Kumar Escape from Guantanamo Bay (2008), Love & Other Drugs (2010), the Black Mirror episode "San Junipero" (2016), season 2 episode 6 of Dark (2017), and it is sung by the protagonist June Osbourne in the Handmaid's Tale episode "Heroic" (2019).

The song is referenced in Lana Del Rey's 2011 debut single "Video Games". The artist as well as the song are referenced in "Belinda Says", from Canadian band Alvvays' 2022 album Blue Rev.

The song was later included in the jukebox musical Head over Heels that used the Go-Go's music in addition to two of Carlisle's solo tracks. The musical debuted on Broadway in 2018.

== See also ==
- List of Billboard number-one singles
- List of number-one singles and albums in Sweden
