= The Best of Belinda, Volume 1 =

Greatest hits album by Belinda Carlisle
- Released: September 1992
- Recorded: 1986–1991
- Genre: Pop
- Length: 62:20
- Label: Virgin

Belinda Carlisle chronology
| Live Your Life Be Free (1991) | The Best of Belinda, Volume 1 (1992) | Real (1993) |

Alternative cover
- Her Greatest Hits cover art

Professional ratings
Review scores
| Source | Rating |
|---|---|
| AllMusic | 4.5/5 stars |

The Best of Belinda, Volume 1 (released in the United States as Her Greatest Hits) is the fifth album by American singer Belinda Carlisle, released in 1992 by Virgin Records. It is Carlisle's first greatest hits compilation album and includes her hits from 1987 to 1992. It is the only Carlisle album to have topped the UK Albums Chart. The Australian and Japanese cover art differs from the International versions as does the American release.

No new tracks were recorded for the album, with Carlisle having only recently given birth at the time of its release. Instead, "Little Black Book", a track from her most recent studio album, Live Your Life Be Free, was released as a single, serving to promote both albums.

== Track listing ==
=== International version ===
| No. | Title | Writer(s) | Album | Length |
|---|---|---|---|---|
| 1. | "Heaven Is a Place on Earth" | Rick Nowels, Ellen Shipley | Heaven on Earth (1987) | 4:06 |
| 2. | "(We Want) The Same Thing" | Nowels, Shipley | Runaway Horses (1989) | 4:16 |
| 3. | "Circle in the Sand" | Nowels, Shipley | Heaven on Earth | 3:40 |
| 4. | "Leave a Light On" | Nowels, Shipley | Runaway Horses | 4:14 |
| 5. | "Little Black Book" | Richard Feldman, Marcy Detroit, Belinda Carlisle | Live Your Life Be Free (1991) | 4:10 |
| 6. | "Summer Rain" | Robbie Seidman, Maria Vidal | Runaway Horses | 4:11 |
| 7. | "Vision of You" | Nowels, Shipley | Runaway Horses | 4:08 |
| 8. | "Live Your Life Be Free" | Nowels, Shipley | Live Your Life Be Free | 4:22 |
| 9. | "I Get Weak" | Diane Warren | Heaven on Earth | 4:14 |
| 10. | "La Luna" | Nowels, Shipley | Runaway Horses | 4:12 |
| 11. | "I Plead Insanity" | Nowels, David Munday, Kushla Prasad | Live Your Life Be Free | 4:11 |
| 12. | "World Without You" | Warren | Heaven on Earth | 3:58 |
| 13. | "Do You Feel Like I Feel?" | Nowels, Shipley | Live Your Life Be Free | 4:14 |
| 14. | "Half the World" | Feldman, Eric Pressly, Shipley | Live Your Life Be Free | 4:11 |
| 15. | "Runaway Horses" | Nowels, Shipley | Runaway Horses | 4:13 |

=== Australian version ===
| No. | Title | Writer(s) | Length |
|---|---|---|---|
| 1. | "Heaven Is a Place on Earth" | Rick Nowels, Ellen Shipley | 4:06 |
| 2. | "(We Want) The Same Thing" | Nowels, Shipley | 4:16 |
| 3. | "Circle in the Sand" | Nowels, Shipley | 3:40 |
| 4. | "Leave a Light On" | Nowels, Shipley | 4:14 |
| 5. | "Little Black Book" | Richard Feldman, Marcy Detroit, Belinda Carlisle | 4:10 |
| 6. | "Summer Rain" | Robbie Seidman, Maria Vidal | 4:11 |
| 7. | "Live Your Life Be Free" | Nowels, Shipley | 4:22 |
| 8. | "I Get Weak" | Diane Warren | 4:14 |
| 9. | "La Luna" | Nowels, Shipley | 4:12 |
| 10. | "I Plead Insanity" | Nowels, David Munday, Kushla Prasad | 4:11 |
| 11. | "Do You Feel Like I Feel?" | Nowels, Shipley | 4:14 |
| 12. | "Runaway Horses" | Nowels, Shipley | 4:13 |

=== US version (Her Greatest Hits) ===
| No. | Title | Writer(s) | Length |
|---|---|---|---|
| 1. | "Heaven Is a Place on Earth" | Rick Nowels, Ellen Shipley | 4:06 |
| 2. | "I Get Weak" | Warren | 4:14 |
| 3. | "I Feel the Magic" | Charlotte Caffey, Segal | 3:20 |
| 4. | "Half the World" | Feldman, Pressly, Shipley | 4:11 |
| 5. | "Gotta Get to You" | Caffey, Carlisle, Paula Jean Brown, James Whelan | 4:06 |
| 6. | "Leave a Light On" | Nowels, Shipley | 4:14 |
| 7. | "Circle in the Sand" | Nowels, Shipley | 3:40 |
| 8. | "Mad About You" | Brown, Whelan, Mitchel Young Evans | 3:36 |
| 9. | "I Feel Free" | Jack Bruce, Pete Brown | 4:49 |
| 10. | "Summer Rain" | Seidman, Vidal | 4:11 |
| 11. | "Live Your Life Be Free" | Nowels, Shipley | 4:22 |
| 12. | "Vision of You" | Nowels, Shipley | 4:08 |
| 13. | "Do You Feel Like I Feel?" | Nowels, Shipley | 4:14 |

== Charts ==
=== Weekly charts ===
Weekly chart performance for The Best of Belinda, Volume 1
| Chart (1992) | Peak position |
|---|---|
| Australian Albums (ARIA) | 14 |
| European Albums (Music & Media) | 14 |
| Finnish Albums (Suomen virallinen lista) | 27 |
| German Albums (Offizielle Top 100) | 35 |
| Italian Albums (FIMI) | 80 |
| Irish Albums (IFPI) | 3 |
| Japanese Albums (Oricon) | 39 |
| New Zealand Albums (RMNZ) | 4 |
| Swedish Albums (Sverigetopplistan) | 26 |
| UK Albums (Official Charts) | 1 |
| Scottish Albums (Official Charts) | 51 |

=== Year-end charts ===
1992 year-end chart performance for The Best of Belinda, Volume 1
| Chart (1992) | Position |
|---|---|
| European Albums (Music & Media) | 88 |
| New Zealand Albums (RMNZ) | 41 |
| UK Albums (OCC) | 33 |

== Certifications and sales ==
Certifications and sales for The Best of Belinda, Volume 1
| Region | Certification | Certified units/sales |
|---|---|---|
| New Zealand (RMNZ) | Platinum | 15,000^{^} |
| United Kingdom (BPI) | 2× Platinum | 600,000^{^} |
| Australia (ARIA) | Platinum | 70,000^{^} |
^{^} Shipments figures based on certification alone.

== See also ==
- List of number-one albums from the 1990s (UK)
