= Nick Egan =

British visual design artist and director of music videos, commercials and film

- Nick Egan at work in his studio in Los Angeles
- Born: 4 July 1957 (age 69); London, England
- Citizenship: British
- Occupations: Film director; artist
- Notable work: Bob Dylan – "Biograph", INXS – "Kick", Oasis – "Live Forever", Alanis Morissette – "You Oughta Know", Duran Duran – "Ordinary World", "All You Need Is Now"
- Spouse: Ann Haugen
- Website: nickegan.com

Nick Egan (born 4 July 1957) is a British visual design artist and director of music videos, commercials and film.

He graduated from the Watford College of Art and Design with a DGA in 1976. While attending college, he created cover art for the singles "White Man In Hammersmith Palais" and "Tommy Gun" for The Clash and T-shirt design for the single "Sheena is A Punk Rocker" for The Ramones. His first chart topping album cover was Dexys Midnight Runners' 'Searching For The Young Soul Rebels'. He collaborated with former Sex Pistols manager and fashion entrepreneur Mr. Malcolm McLaren, for whom he designed the album cover for Bow Wow Wow's 'See Jungle'. His longtime partnership with McLaren led the art direction of McLaren's own inventive albums; Duck Rock and 'Fans'. Egan relocated from Britain to New York, where he created cover art for legendary artists like Bob Dylan and Iggy Pop. Egan also art directed books; John Lennon Listen To These Pictures by Rock-n-Roll photographer Bob Gruen and Bob Dylan's Drawn Blank.

== Art direction in fashion ==
In the early 1980s during London's thriving Piccadilly fashion scene, Egan designed much of the graphic material for Vivienne Westwood's 'Worlds End' clothing line and later art-directed her fashion shows in London and Paris. In New York he continued his exploration in fashion by designing the label for the first collection by Marc Jacobs. The name of the collection was 'Sketchbook'. In addition to art directing Jacob's early fashion shows, Egan's collaboration with Jacobs would continue through the designer's meteoric rise in the fashion business. Additionally, the pair later collaborated on a Sonic Youth video "Sugar Kane", which featured actress Chloë Sevigny in one of her first ever appearances in front of the camera. Egan is presently designing T-shirt prints for retailers Superfine Jeans and 2K Creative.

== Video and film director ==
With the advent of MTV, Egan facilitated his artistic shift into film work through the direction of music videos, the first of which was Iggy Pop's "Real Wild Child". After a period of working with INXS on their multi-platinum 'Kick' and 'X' albums, he relocated to Los Angeles where in time he solidified his place as one of Hollywood's premier music video directors earning among other distinctions, a nomination for an MTV Music Video Award (Soup Dragons, 'Divine Thing'). He went on to direct close to one hundred music videos for many of the top names in the music industry including INXS, Oasis, Duran Duran, Sonic Youth, Kylie Minogue, Belinda Carlisle and Mick Jagger. A May 1997 article in Promo Magazine referred to him as 'his MTVness'. Egan moved into the commercial arena, directing TV spots for such brands as Coca-Cola, Levi's, Nike, Nintendo and Sony PlayStation. Nick's first feature-length film was 'Red Light Runners' starring; Michael Madsen, Harvey Keitel, Roy Schneider, and Crispin Glover. Filming was halted mid production.

== Awards and accreditation ==
- Bow Wow Wow's 'See Jungle' ranked No. 10 in 'The 100 Best Album Covers' (Dorling Kindersley Publishing, 1999).
- College reference book 'Designing For Music' (published by Spencer Drate, 1992) refers specifically to the work of Nick Egan.
- MTV Video Music Awards 1992 nomination for best alternative video: The Soup Dragons 'Divine Thing', 1992
- MTV Video Music Awards 1993 nomination for best cinematography: Duran Duran 'Ordinary World'

== Discography ==
=== Select 45 rpm single cover design ===
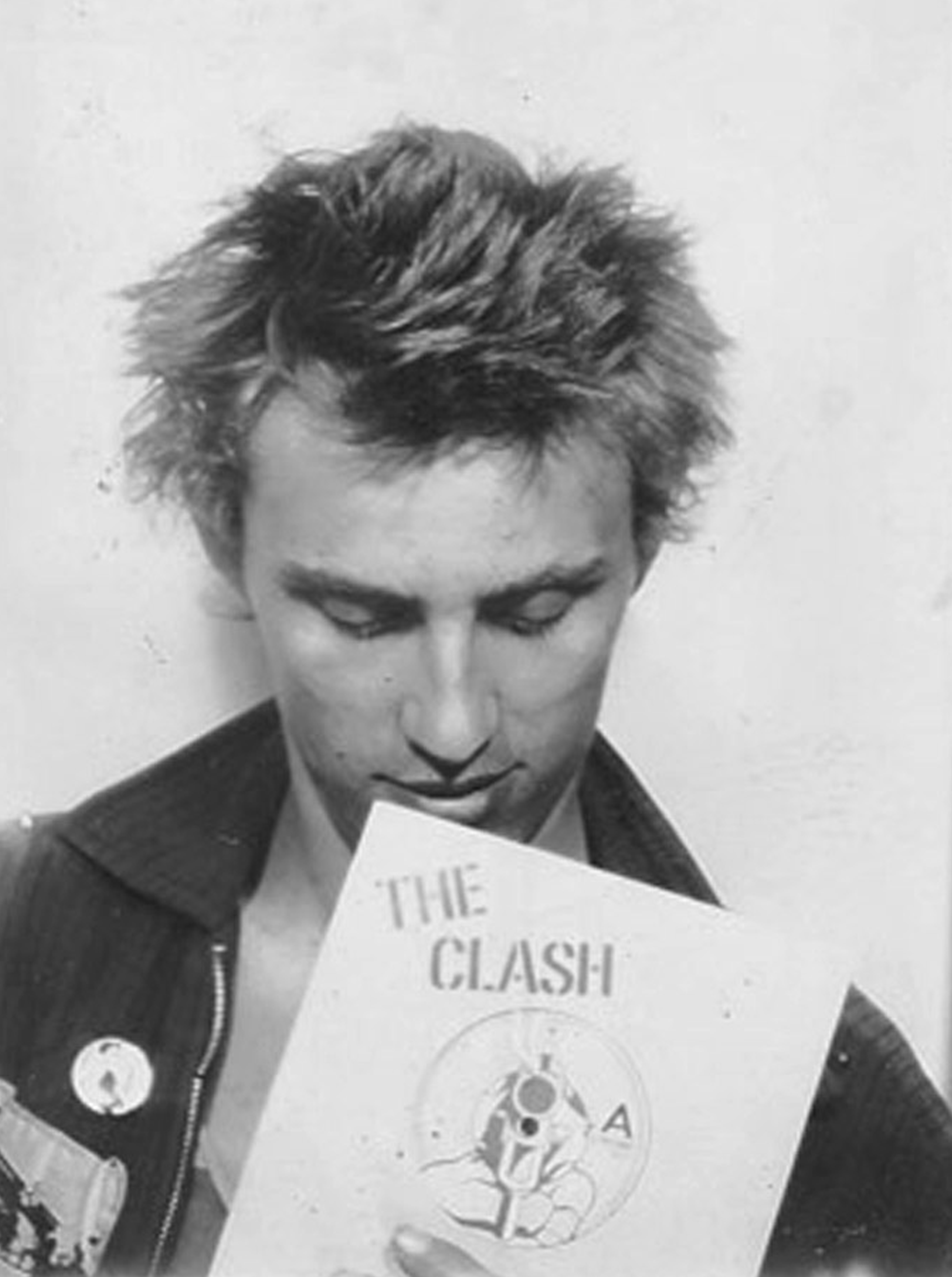
Egan with a copy of The Clash's single 'White Man In Hammersmith Palais'

- Bananarama, "Really Saying Something"
- Belinda Carlisle, "Do You Feel Like I Feel?"
- Belinda Carlisle, "Little Black Book"
- Belinda Carlisle, "Live Your Life Be Free"
- Bow Wow Wow, "Chihuahua" b/w "Golly! Golly! Go Buddy!"
- Bow Wow Wow. "I Want Candy" b/w "King Kong"
- Bow Wow Wow, "Prince of Darkness" b/w "Orang-outang"
- Bow Wow Wow, "See Jungle! (Jungle Boy)" b/w (I'm a) TV Savage"
- Culture Club, "Church of the Poison Mind"
- Culture Club, "Miss Me Blind"
- Duran Duran, "Come Undone"
- Duran Duran, "Ordinary World"
- Duran Duran, "Too Much Information"
- INXS, "Bitter Tears"
- INXS, "By My Side"
- INXS, "Devil Inside"
- INXS, "Disappear"
- INXS, "Guns in the Sky"
- INXS, "New Sensation"
- INXS, "Mystify"
- INXS, "Need You Tonight"
- INXS, "Never Tear Us Apart"
- INXS, "Suicide Blonde"
- INXS, "The Loved One"
- Malcolm McLaren, "Fans"
- The Clash, "Tommy Gun"
- The Clash, "(White Man) In Hammersmith Palais"
- The Psychedelic Furs, "Heartbreak Beat"
- The Psychedelic Furs, "Pretty in Pink"

=== Select album cover design ===
- Apollo Smile, 'Dune Buggy'
- Belinda Carlisle, 'Live Your Life Be Free'
- Bob Dylan, 'Empire Burlesque'
- Bob Dylan, 'Biograph'
- Book of Love, 'Book of Love'
- Book of Love, 'Lullaby'
- Bow Wow Wow, 'See Jungle! See Jungle! Go Join Your Gang Yeah, City All Over! Go Ape Crazy!'
- Deee-Lite, 'World Clique'
- Dexys Midnight Runners, 'Searching for the Young Soul Rebels'
- Duran Duran, 'The Wedding Album'
- Faster Pussycat, 'Wake Me When It's Over'
- Iggy Pop, 'Blah-Blah-Blah'
- INXS, 'Kick'
- INXS, 'Live Baby Live'
- INXS, 'X'
- Kylie Minogue, 'Rhythm of Love'
- Malcolm McLaren, 'Duck Rock' (collaboration with Dondi White, illustration by Keith Haring)
- Malcolm McLaren, 'Fans'
- Malcolm McLaren, 'Swamp Thing'
- Marshall Crenshaw, 'Mary Jean & 9 Others'
- Max Q, 'Max Q'
- New York Dolls, 'Red Patent Leather'
- Pride for Pain, 'Pride for Pain'
- The Psychedelic Furs, 'Midnight to Midnight'
- Ric Ocasek, 'This Side of Paradise'
- Sex Pistols, 'Filthy Lucre Live'
- Simon F, 'Gun'
- Tesla, 'Mechanical Resonance'
- Tesla, 'Psychotic Supper'
- The Cult, 'Sonic Temple'
- The Doors, 'The Doors: Original Soundtrack Recording'
- Various Artists, 'JFK: Original Motion Picture Soundtrack'
- Wendy & Lisa, 'Fruit at the Bottom'

=== Merchandise and branding design ===
- Belinda Carlisle, 'Live Your Life Be Free' (T-shirts, posters)
- Bow Wow Wow, 'See Jungle! See Jungle! Go Join Your Gang Yeah, City All Over! Go Ape Crazy!' (T-shirt, poster)
- Culture Club (Logo)
- Duran Duran, 'The Wedding Album' (T-shirts, posters)
- INXS, 'X' (T-shirts, posters)
- INXS, 'Kick' (T-shirts, posters, merchandising)
- Malcolm McLaren, 'Duck Rock' (T-shirts, promotional posters)
- Malcolm McLaren, 'Fans' (T-shirts, promotional posters)
- The Psychedelic Furs, 'Midnight to Midnight' (T-shirts, posters)
- The Clash, 'Sort It Out Tour' (Poster)
- The Clash, 'Out on Parole' (Poster)
- Ramones, "Sheena Is a Punk Rocker" (T-shirt)
- Wendy & Lisa, 'Fruit at the Bottom' (T-shirts, posters)

=== Select music videos ===
- Alanis Morissette "You Oughta Know"
- Angie Aparo "Spaceship"
- Bananarama "Long Train Running"
- Bee Gees "Alone"
- Belinda Carlisle "Do You Feel Like I Feel?"
- Belinda Carlisle "Half the World"
- Belinda Carlisle "Live Your Life Be Free"
- Better Than Ezra "Desperately Wanting"
- Big Wreck "That Song"
- Bon Jovi "Dry County"
- Bon Jovi "I Believe"
- Candlebox "Cover Me"
- Candlebox "Far Behind"
- Candlebox "It's Alright"
- Carole King "Anyone at All"
- Catherine Wheel "Judy Staring at the Sun"
- Charles & Eddie "Jealousy"
- Cheap Trick "You're All I Wanna Do"
- Deftones "Bored"
- Digable Planets "Nickel Bags"
- Duncan Sheik "Wishful Thinking"
- Duran Duran "All You Need Is Now"
- Duran Duran "Ordinary World"
- Duran Duran "Perfect Day"
- Duran Duran "White Lines (Don't Do It)"
- Duran Duran "Pressure Off"
- Duran Duran "Last Night in the City"
- EMF "Children" (live)
- EMF "Unbelievable" (live)
- Flesh for Lulu "I Go Crazy"
- House of Love "Shine On"
- Iggy Pop "Real Wild Child"
- INXS "Don't Lose Your Head"
- INXS "Searching"
- Ivan Neville "Not Just Another Girl"
- k.d. Lang "Anywhere but Here"
- Kon Kan "Puss N' Boots"
- Kylie Minogue "Step Back in Time"
- Mick Jagger "Intro"
- Mick Jagger "Primitive Cool"
- Mötley Crüe "Hooligan's Holiday"
- Oasis "Supersonic" (version 2)
- Oasis "Live Forever" (version 2)
- Oasis "Go Let It Out"
- Oasis "Sunday Morning Call"
- Oasis "Where Did It All Go Wrong?"
- Oasis "Who Feels Love?"
- P.M. Dawn "Sometimes I Miss You So Much"
- Pride for Pain "Tomato" "Puzzle" "Romantic"
- Rancid "Bloodclot"
- Rod Stewart "I Can't Deny It"
- Silverchair "Abuse Me"
- Sleeper "Inbetweener" (US Version)
- Sonic Youth "Sugar Kane"
- Sonic Youth "Youth Against Fascism"
- The Soup Dragons "Divine Thing"
- The Soup Dragons "One Way Street"
- The Soup Dragons "Pleasure"
- Super 8 "King of the World"
- Terence Trent D'Arby "Vibrator"
- The Quireboys "Hey You"
- Tony! Toni! Toné! "Anniversary"
- UB40 "Tell Me Is It True"
- Uncle Kracker "Follow Me"
- Wendy & Lisa "Are You My Baby"
- Wendy & Lisa "Honeymoon Express"
- Wendy & Lisa "Lolly Lolly"
- Whodini "Freaks Come Out at Night"
- Yazz and Aswad "How Long"
