= Elegantly Wasted =

Studio album by INXS
- Released: 15 April 1997
- Recorded: Mid-1996
- Studios: Armoury (Vancouver, Canada); El Cortijo (Málaga, Spain)
- Genre: Alternative rock
- Length: 47:56
- Label: Mercury
- Producers: Bruce Fairbairn and Andrew Farriss

INXS chronology
The Greatest Hits (1994)	Elegantly Wasted (1997)	INXS: Live in Aspen – February 1997 (1997)

Singles from Elegantly Wasted
- 1. "Elegantly Wasted" Released: March 1997; 2. "Everything" Released: May 1997; 3. "Don't Lose Your Head" Released: June 1997; 4. "Searching" Released: September 1997

Elegantly Wasted is the tenth studio album by Australian rock band INXS. It was released on 15 April 1997, and is the final album recorded with lead singer Michael Hutchence before his death in November that same year.

The band had spent April 1996 rehearsing in London and moved over to Vancouver to record with producer Bruce Fairbairn the same month. Production of the album was completed by Hutchence and songwriter and multi-instrumentalist Andrew Farriss in Spain later the same year. Two songs that did not make the final cut of the album were included on the Bang the Drum EP (2004).

The album's title is from Hutchence, with the single itself trying to recapture the magic and groove of the Kick album, particularly the single, "Need You Tonight".

All three Farriss brothers dedicated the album to their mother, Jill, who died in 1995.

== Background ==
In June 1994, INXS ended their US contract with Atlantic Records, and signed a new worldwide record deal with PolyGram/Mercury Records; however, the group agreed to release one final record through the Atlantic label - The Greatest Hits. Released several months later on 31 October, the compilation included two new songs: "The Strangest Party (These Are the Times)" and "Deliver Me".

After a long break, INXS reconvened in 1996 to record their tenth studio album, Elegantly Wasted, their last with Hutchence. In 1995, Hutchence already began work on his self-titled solo album; the project was put on hold until Elegantly Wasted was completed. In an interview with The Album Network magazine in March 1997, Hutchence said, "We really wanted to get off the old carousel for a while. As a band, we have recorded an album every twelve to eighteen months over the last five or six years. This helped to create a situation resulting in a lot of personal and business friction within the band, as well as the record label, at the time of the completion of our last studio album Full Moon, Dirty Hearts. With the completion of the album, we also fulfilled our contract with Atlantic Records. So, it just seemed like the logical time to take a break".

== Recording and production ==
With both Michael Hutchence and Andrew Farriss living in London, the songwriting duo first started talking about a new record over the phone. After spending months talking about new ideas, the pair finally got together, and began working on new material. Using 24-track reels and ADAT (Alesis Digital Audio Tape) recorders, the pair put together a handful of demo tapes, which included an early version of the song "Searching". The remaining members of INXS flew out to meet Hutchence and Farriss in London. When the entire group got together, they began rehearsing the material that had been previously recorded by Hutchence and Farriss. The rehearsals began in April 1996. While visiting friends Bono and Larry Mullen Jr. from U2 in Dublin during mid-1996, Hutchence and Farriss rented a small studio where they continued working on the album. They put the finishing touches on the existing demo tapes and composed new recordings. One of the first songs to be completed during these sessions was "Searching". The band first previewed the song live at the Australian ARIA Music Awards in September 1996.

Before meeting with Fairbairn, the band sent him all the material they had been working on. Fairbairn had just finished working with Irish rock band The Cranberries. Upon receiving the material Fairbairn commented, "I was impressed with the feel and the different sounds that they'd been using." He added, "I actually ended up suggesting that we might want to save some of the stuff on the demos – because the chances were that when we were back in the studio we wouldn't be able to recreate that vibe". After listening to the material, Fairbairn flew to London to meet with the band. He spent a few afternoons with Hutchence and Farriss discussing the project. A date was set for production at Fairbairn's own recording studio in Vancouver, with both himself and Farriss producing. When later asked about his role in the production of Elegantly Wasted, Fairbairn said, "Well, I didn't really co-produce with the band, but the record was produced with Andrew Farriss. Andrew was certainly a player at the demo stage, and as we ended up keeping some of the stuff on the demos I felt that it was fair to recognise his contribution in some way".

The band first arrived at the Armoury studio in Vancouver in late April 1996 to begin the recording sessions. Most of the demos that were brought out to Vancouver had to be reorganised, taking out and discarding certain parts, as well as adding in new drum beats and bass lines. Some members of the band had to provide overdubbing on the existing demos, including Hutchence who recorded new overdubs on the vocals. Most of the album was recorded digitally; the drums, bass and guitar on the tracks "Girl on Fire", "We Are Thrown Together" and "Bang the Drum" (dropped during production) were recorded using analogue equipment. Farriss and Hutchence finished the album later in 1996. Additional musicians were brought in to provide backing vocals on "Don't Lose Your Head", "Searching" and "I'm Just a Man". After the sessions in Spain had wrapped, the recordings were returned to Vancouver, where engineer Mike Plotnikoff began the initial mixing, before sending them to Townhouse Studios in London, where music producer Tom Lord-Alge carried out the bulk of the mixing. Plotnikoff recalls, "I did a mix for him [Lord-Alge] beforehand in Vancouver so that he had a guideline as to roughly what we wanted".

== Tour ==
INXS embarked on their 20th anniversary tour in support for Elegantly Wasted, beginning with a string of warm-up dates in the US on 17 April 1997 at the Irving Plaza in New York. During their time in New York, the band were asked to appear on numerous talk shows to perform the album's brand new single, "Elegantly Wasted", including the Rosie O'Donnell show on 16 April and the Late Show with David Letterman on 22 April. The group would play three more shows in cities across North America, finishing up at the Mayan Theater in Los Angeles, California on 24 April.

The first leg of the international tour brought the band to South Africa, their first and only tour of the country. A few days before playing their first show at the 3 Arts Theatre in Cape Town on 29 May, the band was hurriedly asked by the producers of Face/Off to shoot a music video for the album's third single, "Don't Lose Your Head". The video was shot by long-time collaborator and friend Nick Egan, inside a large plane hangar on an airstrip located in Cape Town. After playing a show in Durban, the group travelled up to Johannesburg to play three shows at the Ellis Park Arena (formerly known as the Standard Bank Arena) beginning on 3 June and finishing on 5 June. The tour continued across Europe where the band played various arenas and festivals beginning 9 June at the Barrowland ballroom in Glasgow, Scotland, and ending on 5 July at the Midtfyns Festival in Ringe, Denmark.

INXS returned to the US on 11 July where they played eight shows along the West Coast. In late August, the band started making their way across the Midwest. The itinerary included visits to Chicago, Illinois, Minneapolis, Minnesota and Kansas City, Missouri. A show in Milwaukee, Wisconsin was cancelled on 27 August after it was reported in a newspaper that Hutchence had sprained his ankle. On 31 August, the tour moved north into Canada, with shows being played in Montreal, Quebec and Toronto, Ontario. While playing a show in Montreal, Nicolas Cage was spotted by fans in the VIP balcony near the stage. Hutchence dedicated "What You Need" and "Don't Lose Your Head" (used in Cage's movie Face/Off) to the actor. Their last concert with Hutchence was at the Star Lake Amphitheatre in Burgettstown, PA on 27 September.

In November, the band returned to Sydney, Australia to prepare for their homecoming tour. Before setting off on a thirteen-date trek around Australia on 23 November, the band set up for rehearsal sessions at ABC Studios. The homecoming tour was quickly cancelled when the death of Hutchence was announced on 22 November.

== Packaging ==
A mini video shoot was specially shot and directed for the album's cinematic album art. The entire video shoot was directed and photographed by Danish photographer Pierre Winther in locations around California in 1996. Winther, famous for his filmic visionary manages to tell a complex story in each of his staged shots; the front cover for Elegantly Wasted shows a dramatic shot of the band caught up in a cinematic setting where it appears that an attractive girl has emerged safely from a car accident, just under the old Sixth Street Viaduct at 635-651 S Anderson St, (34°02′12″N 118°13′23″W) near downtown Los Angeles. The photograph shows the original 1932 viaduct, which was demolished in 2016.

A different photograph of the girl getting out of the car was shot and used as the artwork for the "Elegantly Wasted" single. The same girl can be seen wandering the streets of San Francisco in the music video for the album's second single, "Searching". The album's accompanying booklet contains additional photography of the band near the Edwards Air Force Base in the Californian desert. The artwork for the singles, "Searching" and "Everything" feature photographs as the cover art, which were also taken in the Californian desert.

Only three songs from the track listing had lyrics printed in the liner notes; "Elegantly Wasted", "Show Me (Cherry Baby)" and "Shake the Tree".

== Reception ==
Professional ratings
Review scores
Source	Rating
AllMusic	2/5 stars
The Boston Phoenix	3/4 stars
Detroit Free Press	3/4 stars
Entertainment Weekly	A
The Guardian	3/5 stars
Houston Press	3/5 stars
MusicHound Rock	4/5
NME	6/10
The Springfield News-Leader	3/4 stars
The Times-Transcript	5/5 stars
Winnipeg Sun	3.5/5 stars

Reviews for the album were mixed-to-polarizing on its initial release. Patrick McDonald publishing his review in The Advertiser (Adelaide) announced, it's great to hear Inxs return to form with an album full of strong songs, rather than the aimless grooves of its recent efforts. This is like hearing a fresh batch of greatest hits". Stephen Thomas Erlewine writing in his AllMusic review, said "The band does dabble in contemporary dance on Elegantly Wasted, but it all comes out sounding like the lite funk-n-roll of Kick, only without the energy. And without the tunes". The A.V. Club's Stephen Thompson was unfavorable towards the album, calling it an underwhelming nostalgia trip and expressing, "INXS lacks U2's well publicized ability to evolve as the times change."

Music critic J. D. Considine from The Baltimore Sun, was pleased that the Cd's 11 songs are still wonderfully entertaining, with a near irresistible mix of dance- music savvy and rock and roll attitude." Music writer and musician, Ted Drozdowski wrote in his review for The Boston Phoenix giving the CD three out of four stars, he said the group have retained the "big rhythmic stomp necessary to rock- and do it hard when they please. Great dynamics, leaner instrumentation. This is a strong, simple pop outing worthy of respect. And listening." The Calgary Herald found the disc to be the group's best effort in ages with its stripped down, funky rock grooves colored by acoustic guitars and sitars and Michael Hutchence actually singing something other than cryptic lyrics."

Steve Knopper of The Chicago Tribune disliked the release, he mentions, shifting gears causes fatal momentum loss - "Everything I Do" moves to fast for a ballad, and the slower "Searching" needs something beyond an uninteresting drum pattern and Hutchence's Whiney crooning." Steven Batten from The Cleveland Scene, was thrilled that, "Elegantly Wasted's strength is, in fact, its diversity, a hallmark of the band's sound since the early days, but often obscured by an over-active sense of adventure on recent efforts. This time, they've stuck with that strength, pushing each track to the limit but never losing sight of the big picture." Ryan Suffern writing in the student - run newspaper The Daily Illini acknowledged, Inxs has returned to make one of their strongest albums in their nearly 20 - year career. He praised the album for containing a unique blend of sounds. The Band builds upon their past created style, while integrating new and innovative sounds."

E! Online gave the album an "A" grade, expressing Inxs finally got off the rock - biz hamster wheel (album - a - year, album - a - year, album - a - year) finding the change is good. A solid effort with nary a speck of filler, If these guys are the Australian Aerosmith, maybe we should swing a trade." Jim Farber of Entertainment Weekly also scored the album an "A", and wrote, "The Jaggersque vocal Yowl of Michael Hutchence, matched to the spiky James Brown funk of the Farriss Brothers, gives their new melodies swing and tone." The Globe and Mail's Chris Dafoe wrote a 'decent' review of the album. Signaling, "it's a well-crafted album, featuring the strongest bunch of songs that the band has assembled since Kick. Insisting, "While they don't break much new ground, the band keeps things lean and mean as Michael Hutchence vamps through the title track and songs such as Everything." GQ gave the album a favourable review, calling Elegantly Wasted "vibrant" and "exciting", and concluded that "the '80s revival starts here".

Houston Press's David Whitman appreciated that Inxs has recorded some quality music over the past decade, for the most part, after breaking through with 1987's Kick, they let their pretensions get the best of them. He ended his review positive, acknowledging that none of these problems plague Elegantly Wasted. On this CD the band sounds revitalized, and finally ready for the next century."The Independent's Andy Gill Opined, There's precious little elegance about Inxs's tenth album, but plenty of waste. It presents a band apparently no longer able to write songs and increasingly dependent on cobbling together material from bits and pieces of riffs." Writer Dave Veitch, posted his review of the disc in Jam! saying how nice then that INXS have re-emerged with all six members intact, and a more than decent new album out on April 15. He was proud that, "Inxs haven't lost the ability to write a good hook or get bodies moving on the dance floor". In Paul Freeman's review for The Kokomo Tribune, He applauded the group for having enough pulsating, soulful hooks scattered through this new album to suggest that the band from Down Under isn't down and out yet."

The Leader (Wrexham newspaper) gave a warm response to the record, writing these Aussie wonders are hitting back with a great new album. This is familiar Inxs with a slightly rawer, more grown up edge." Lise Harwin of the Independent Student Newspaper called The Michigan Daily, Wrote Inxs makes poppy elegant comeback, recognizing one which is easily as good ( and as strange-ly familiar.) A dose of bittersweet longing can be found in the slowly synthesized "Searching," Poignant introspection on "Building Bridges," she noted, Take it or leave it, listening to "Elegantly Wasted" is a little like being in a time warp: You get the danceable songs without having to put on the acid washed jeans. For any fan of quality pop, what could be better? Larry Printz of The Morning Call, Liked Michael Hutchence and crews back-to-basics approach, he was pleased that it generally works well. While mentioning, "Elegantly Wasted" doesn't quite sparkle like 1987's "Kick" it has enough pop- rock smarts to make it one tasty listen. Nothing is wasted here."

Music Week gave an "Excellent" 5 out of 5 stars, Writing Immaculate, over-sexed and instantly familiar, this album's rhythm makeover and extra guitars leave the band facing global multi-Platinum sales yet again." Dan Aquilante of The New York Post scored the album 3.5 out of 4 stars. Recognizing the big '80s anthemic rock of "New Sensation" is gone, this Aussie band has wisely traded it in for electro funk that peppers much of Elegantly Wasted. Inxs has created a sweaty, sexy collection of rock that allows Hutchence room to breathe heavily and passionately about life, living and love. In Roger Morton's review for NME, he gave "Elegantly Wasted" a "decent" rating score of 6/10, he concluded in songs like 'Show me (Cherry baby) the riffs are appropriately dirty 'n' grinding, and Michael is effectively '60s Cockney Muddy Waters in his pronunciation of "baybeeyugh." 'Everything' has plenty of happy clappy gospel feel allied to a finger Wagging Vocal. And, give or take the odd' hint of stompy psychedelia in 'Shake the tree.' He ended his review saying the goods are all the." Matt Cliff writing in The North County Times, noticed that the looser recording structure gives the songs lots of breathing room, and lets the keyboard and saxophone touches fill the musical spaces in unexpected ways. He said, the latter along with "We Are Thrown Together," with its middle eastern guitar lines and bubbling drums, are the most memorable songs on an unexpectedly listenable album."

The Ottawa Citizen, recognized the release is marked by more dance-oriented rock, but with a heavier emphasis on guitar arrangements than in the past. They found, cuts such as Girl On Fire and She Is Rising snarl and swagger a bit more than in the past, the former pushed along by a grinding horn arrangement. Concluding Inxs does a fine job of being a middle aged rock band." John Marr's of The Peterborough Herald and Post, welcomed the band for their creativity being in full throttle, moulding a classy new release. He initiated that, "the record tends to tail off towards the end, but when it's focused, it's great." The Press & Sun-Bulletin, appreciated that "Elegantly Wasted" sounds like a really good Inxs album, well, it is. Mentioning a serious upturn from the band's most recent two albums, which sounded like a bored Inxs." The Richmond Times Dispatch gave a B+ rating, commenting on the album being a tremendous improvement, at least compared to the stuffy rhythms of 1993's disappointing Full Moon, Dirty Hearts. Highlighting vintage cuts like the funky Don't Lose Your Head and the simplistic I'm Just A Man."

Rip It Up (Adelaide)'s Stephen Munchenberg admitted after a few listens, for a band critics find a easy target. There being a lot about the Six-Piece to criticize, however Munchenberg found tracks like the catchy 'Everything' their best stuff in a long time. Follow that with 'Don't lose your head' (which should be a hit for them if nothing else is) and you begin to think they must have learned a lot since that dreadful last album. The plot thickens, with the soulful sounds of 'Searching' but the highlight goes to 'I'm just a man' Rolling Stone's Elysa Gardner was not impressed with the album, finding it an exercise in nostalgia and added, "the sinuous dance grooves and crackling bursts of guitar in new songs such as "Elegantly Wasted" and "Don't Lose Your Head" don't seem very fresh." RPM (magazine) awarded the album, Hot pick of their new cd releases, calling it eagerly-anticipated, noting a collage of strong R&B-influenced pop songs that will keep sales afloat through the summer. Favoring tracks like Show me (Cherry Baby), Searching, and Building Bridges."

Sarra Manning from Select (magazine) gave a one star review of the CD, saying it doesn't matter whether you buy the new album by INXS, Depeche Mode, James or Simple Minds, because chances are they'll all sound the same. She insisted that Elegantly Wasted is Disposable Waste." Alex Tung writing for The Stanford Daily student- run independent Newspaper, was pleased with the album, Inxs has returned to the dark, reflective style of Welcome To Wherever You Are, while keeping some of the vibrant energy that carried Kick and earlier albums through the 80's. He commented that, Elegantly Wasted is a 90's experiment in different styles, that sees Inxs definitely starting to climb again ." The British Broadsheet newspaper, The Sunday Telegraph said that Inxs '10th album "suggests that they are by no means a spent force. It has that big, breezy sound redolent of so many rock bands of a certain age, from The Rolling Stones to U2. Strong, driving tunes; a touch of bluesy, bottle - neck guitar."

The Sydney Morning Herald was unhappy with the release, initiating, the problem for the band is that this new album is not going to bring in new fans, and the old ones will need more than this to entice them out of their leather lounges and into the stores." Dirk Lammers writing for his review of the album in, The Tampa Tribune mentioned the disc's faster-paced tunes are the most successful. "Show me (Cherry Baby)" kicks off with an intro sounding like something out of "Mission Impossible" or a James Bond flick, He finished his review with "Elegantly Wasted" is not spectacular, but INXS is at least trying some new things. Many work." Rick de Yampert writing for The Tennessean gave the album 3 out of 5 stars, hailing Elegantly Wasted' as a welcome return after a four year hiatus. Finding the band too wise and experienced to be content slumming through alt - rock land. That leaves one conclusion: Rock can use a band like this right now.

The Waterloo Region Record declared that the album Exhibited a greater dynamic range than past albums, Elegantly Wasted mixes up familiar spacious guitar blasts, Jon Farriss's pounding rhythms and Michael Hutchence's breathless swagger with newer horizons." Ted Shaw of The Windsor Star, Considered Elegantly Wasted to be the bands most consistent album in 10 years. Praising Jon Farriss' drums and Gary Beers' bass lines, particularly mark this Inxs release as one of the most hard-driving of its career. He scored the album an "A". Winnipeg Sun described that while several songs take a while to develop, they favored insistent urgency of cuts like Show Me, Elegantly Wasted, I'm Just A Man, and Girl On Fire will cause more than a few people to revisit the tightly coiled energy of a group they may have written off."

=== Commercial performance ===
The album did not perform as well as anticipated. In the US it only reached number 41 on the Billboard Top 200. It did perform better outside the US peaking at number 14 in both Canada and Australia, and number 16 in the United Kingdom. Elegantly Wasted was certified Gold in Canada on 9 May 1997 having sold 50,000 copies.

== Track listing ==
All tracks are written by Andrew Farriss and Michael Hutchence.

Elegantly Wasted – Standard edition
No.	Title	Length
1.	"Show Me (Cherry Baby)"	4:17
2.	"Elegantly Wasted"	4:32
3.	"Everything"	3:13
4.	"Don't Lose Your Head"	4:02
5.	"Searching"	4:04
6.	"I'm Just a Man"	4:48
7.	"Girl on Fire"	3:55
8.	"We Are Thrown Together"	5:36
9.	"Shake the Tree"	4:10
10.	"She Is Rising"	5:24
11.	"Building Bridges"	3:55
Total length:		47:56

Elegantly Wasted – International edition
No.	Title	Length
12.	"Shine"	3:52
Total length:		51:48

Elegantly Wasted – Japanese and Australian limited edition
No.	Title	Length
13.	"Let It Ride"	3:44
Total length:		55:32

== Personnel ==
Personnel as listed in the album's liner notes are:

INXS

- Michael Hutchence – vocals, guitar (10)
- Andrew Farriss – keyboards, guitars
- Tim Farriss – guitars
- Kirk Pengilly – guitars, saxophone
- Garry Gary Beers – bass
- Jon Farriss – drums

Additional musicians

- Luis Conte – percussion
- Bill Runge – baritone saxophone (7)
- Tom Keenlyside – tenor saxophone (7), horn arrangements (7)
- Paul Baron – trumpet (7)
- Derry Byrne – trumpet (7)
- Joani Bye – backing vocals (4, 5)
- Tania Hancheroff – backing vocals (4, 5)
- Billie Godfrey – backing vocals (6)
- Caroline MacKendrick – backing vocals (6)

Production

- Bruce Fairbairn – producer
- Andrew Farriss – producer
- Richard Guy – engineer
- Mike Plotnikoff – engineer
- Delwyn Brooks – second engineer
- Paul Silveria – assistant engineer
- Tom Lord-Alge – mixing
- Julie Gardner – mix assistant
- George Marino – mastering at Sterling Sound (New York City, New York)
- David Edwards – production coordinator
- Christina de la Sala – production coordinator
- Mat Cook at Intro – design concept, art direction
- David Smith – design
- Pierre Winther – art direction, photography

== Charts and certifications ==
=== Weekly charts ===
Weekly chart performance for Elegantly Wasted
Chart (1997)	Peak position
Australian Albums (ARIA)	14
Austrian Albums (Ö3 Austria)	32
Canada Top Albums/CDs (RPM)	14
Dutch Albums (Album Top 100)	31
French Albums (SNEP)	30
German Albums (Offizielle Top 100)	23
Hungarian Albums (MAHASZ)	32
New Zealand Albums (RMNZ)	47
Norwegian Albums (VG-lista)	18
Scottish Albums (Official Charts)	17
Swedish Albums (Sverigetopplistan)	28
Swiss Albums (Schweizer Hitparade)	13
UK Albums (Official Charts)	16
UK Rock & Metal Albums (Official Charts)	3
US Billboard 200	41

=== Sales and certifications ===
Sales and certifications for Elegantly Wasted
Region	Certification	Certified units/sales
Canada (Music Canada)	Gold	50,000^{^}
United States (RIAA)	—	176,000
^{^} Shipments figures based on certification alone.
