= Vision of You =

1990 single by Belinda Carlisle

Single by Belinda Carlisle

from the album Runaway Horses
- B-side: "Leave a Light On" (Kamikazee mix)
- Released: May 14, 1990
- Length: 4:40
- Label: MCA; Virgin
- Songwriters: Rick Nowels; Ellen Shipley
- Producer: Rick Nowels

Belinda Carlisle singles chronology
"Runaway Horses" (1990)	"Vision of You" (1990)	"Live Your Life Be Free" (1991)

"Vision of You" is a song by American singer Belinda Carlisle, released by MCA and Virgin Records as the fifth single (sixth in Japan) from her third solo album, Runaway Horses (1989). The song was released on May 14, 1990, in the United Kingdom and reached number 41. A year later, it was remixed and re-released on 12-inch vinyl with a live version of "Heaven Is a Place on Earth", but this release charted lower, at number 71. "Vision of You" is written by Rick Nowels and Ellen Shipley, and produced by Nowels.

== Critical reception ==
Paul Lester from Melody Maker felt Carlisle "comes on all overblown and bombastic just when pop decided to rid itself of all fleshy excess and fussy baggage (re-house, acid, etc). Belinda's almost Beatles-esque attention towards the elaborate flourish, and a steadfast refusal to swop meandering patterns for a simplistic crash-bang-wallop, must surely be applauded." In 1991, pan-European magazine Music & Media wrote, "Now that rumours are spreading about a reunion of the Go-Go's, this re-release of an old Carlisle solo record will kill time. The slow, catchy melody will provide a moment of peace on EHR stations." Peter Stanton from Record Mirror viewed the song as a "mellow number [that] is idly going nowhere."

== Music video ==
A music video was produced to promote the single, featuring both live footage of the song's performance and tour material shot during her Asian tour.

== Track listings ==
- 7-inch, cassette, and mini-CD single
1. "Vision of You" (7-inch version)
2. "Leave a Light On" (Kamikazee mix)

The US cassette single contains blank tape on the B-side.

- 12-inch and CD single
1. "Vision of You" (7-inch version)
2. "Leave a Light On" (Kamikazee mix)
3. "I Feel Free" (12-inch extended mix)
- 1991 12-inch single

A. "Vision of You" (Remix '91)
B. "Heaven Is a Place on Earth" (live)

== Charts ==
Chart (1990)	Peak position
Australia (ARIA)	84
Canada Top Singles (RPM)	74
Europe (Eurochart Hot 100)	95
UK Singles (Official Charts)	41

Chart (1991)	Peak position
Luxembourg (Radio Luxembourg)	19
UK Singles (Official Charts) "Vision of You '91"	71
UK Airplay (Music Week)	43

== Release history ==
Region	Date	Format(s)	Label(s)	Ref.
United Kingdom	May 14, 1990	7-inch vinyl; 12-inch vinyl; CD; cassette	Virgin	
Japan	June 21, 1990	Mini-CD	Virgin	
Australia	July 23, 1990	7-inch vinyl; 12-inch vinyl; cassette	Virgin	

== Jennifer Rush version ==
"Vision of You"

Single by Jennifer Rush

from the album Jennifer Rush
- B-side: "Waiting for the Heartache"
- Released: February 1993
- Length: 4:31
- Label: EMI
- Songwriters: Rick Nowels; Ellen Shipley
- Producer: Rick Nowels

Jennifer Rush singles chronology
"Never Say Never" (1992)	"Vision of You" (1993)	"A Broken Heart" (1993)

"Vision of You" was covered by American singer Jennifer Rush for her 1992 self-titled album. It was released as the second single from the album and charted in Germany. A Spanish-language re-recording titled "Vision De Ti" was included on Spanish pressings of the album and was released as a promotional single.

=== Track list ===
- 7-inch single / CD single
1. "Vision of You" (Radio version) – 3:49
2. "Waiting for the Heartache" – 4:26

=== Charts ===
Chart (1993)	Peak position
Germany (GfK)	56

== Other cover versions ==
- In 1993, a cover was recorded and released by Tony Award-winning musical actress Lea Salonga. The song appeared on her self-titled album the same year.
