= In Between Days (disambiguation) =

"In Between Days" is a 1985 song by The Cure.

It may also refer to:

- In Between Days (film) a 2006 film directed by So Yong Kim
- In Between Days (comic), Teva Harrison's account, in comic form, of her life with terminal cancer

== See also ==
- In Between (disambiguation)
