= Elegantly Wasted (song) =

1997 single by INXS

Single by INXS

from the album Elegantly Wasted
- B-side: "Need You Tonight"
- Released: 10 March 1997
- Recorded: Mid-1996
- Genre: Alternative rock
- Length: 4:32 (album version); 3:53 (single edit)
- Label: Mercury
- Songwriters: Michael Hutchence; Andrew Farriss
- Producer: Bruce Fairbairn

INXS singles chronology
"The Strangest Party (These Are the Times)" (1994)	"Elegantly Wasted" (1997)	"Everything" (1997)

"Elegantly Wasted" is the title track and first single released from the album Elegantly Wasted by Australian band INXS. The single was released in Europe, Japan, Australia, South Africa, Canada, and the United States.

== Background ==
The song is said to have been written after Michael Hutchence and Bono from U2 went out for a "night on the town".

Released as a single on 10 March 1997, the song became the band's fourth and final number-one single in Canada, topping the RPM 100 Hit Tracks chart for three weeks in May and June 1997. In the United States, the song did not chart on the Billboard Hot 100 due to rules in place at the time regarding commercial releases, but it did reach number 27 on the Billboard Hot 100 Airplay chart. The song also peaked at number 48 in the band's native Australia and reached the top 40 in Iceland, Switzerland, and the United Kingdom.

== Lyrical content ==
After an argument with Noel Gallagher of Oasis, Hutchence added some additional vocals to the chorus, which the rest of the band were unaware of until months after the album's release. When listening for it, the chorus can either be heard as "I am elegantly wasted" or "I am better than Oasis". This was further to an altercation between Hutchence and the Gallagher brothers at the 1996 Brit Awards. At the awards, Noel Gallagher collected an award from Hutchence by saying, "Has-beens should not be presenting awards to gonna-be's." It was also reported that Liam and Hutchence had a scuffle backstage with Hutchence throwing a fire extinguisher at Liam following some disparaging remarks Liam made about Hutchence's partner Paula Yates.

== B-sides ==
The B-sides on the first CD single included INXS's biggest hit "Need You Tonight", a 1995 mix of "Original Sin" by Chris & James and a remix of album track "I'm Only Looking" from Full Moon, Dirty Hearts by David Morales. The second CD single included three remixes of "Elegantly Wasted" by dance artists Shagsonic and G-Force.

== Music video ==
Directed by English music director Walter Stern, the video was shot over two days in January 1997, and features the band wandering around an airport terminal as the awaiting passengers begin to watch and interact with the band. A small set was built in Los Angeles to resemble the interiors of an airport with extras being brought in to play the passengers. The video also includes snippets and brief clips taken from the Elegantly Wasted video shoot which were photographed and used for the album's cinematic cover art.

== Track listings ==
Australasian and UK CD1; Japanese CD single

1. "Elegantly Wasted" (radio edit) – 3:53
2. "Need You Tonight" – 3:01
3. "Original Sin" (Epic Adventure) – 9:37
4. "I'm Only Looking" (The Morales Bad Yard mix) – 8:17

Australasian and UK CD2

1. "Elegantly Wasted" (radio edit) – 3:53
2. "Elegantly Wasted" (Shagsonic remix) – 7:56
3. "Elegantly Wasted" (Shagsonic dub) – 8:25
4. "Elegantly Wasted" (G-Force and Seiji Remix) – 6:36

UK cassette single and European CD single

1. "Elegantly Wasted" (radio edit) – 3:53
2. "Need You Tonight" – 3:01

== Charts ==
=== Weekly charts ===
Chart (1997)	Peak position
Australia (ARIA)	48
Belgium (Ultratip Bubbling Under Flanders)	7
Canada Top Singles (RPM)	1
Canada Adult Contemporary (RPM)	21
Canada Rock/Alternative (RPM)	3
Europe (Eurochart Hot 100)	100
Germany (GfK)	72
Iceland (Íslenski Listinn Topp 40)	7
Italy Airplay (Music & Media)	6
Netherlands (Single Top 100)	90
Scottish Singles Sales (Official Charts)	15
Switzerland (Schweizer Hitparade)	36
UK Singles (Official Charts)	20
US Radio Songs (Billboard)	27
US Adult Alternative Airplay (Billboard)	2
US Adult Pop Airplay (Billboard)	13
US Alternative Airplay (Billboard)	13
US Mainstream Rock Airplay (Billboard)	37
US Pop Airplay (Billboard)	22

=== Year-end charts ===
Chart (1997)	Position
Canada Top Singles (RPM)	9
Canada Adult Contemporary (RPM)	62
Canada Rock/Alternative (RPM)	37
Romania (Romanian Top 100)	89
US Modern Rock Tracks (Billboard)	70
US Top 40/Mainstream (Billboard)	98
US Triple-A (Billboard)	24

== Release history ==
Region	Date	Format(s)	Label(s)	Ref(s).
United Kingdom	10 March 1997	CD; cassette	Mercury	
United States	10 March 1997	Radio	Mercury	
Japan	9 April 1997	CD	Mercury	
