= Live Your Life Be Free =

Studio album by Belinda Carlisle
- Released: October 14, 1991
- Genre: Pop rock
- Length: 51:11
- Labels: MCA; Virgin
- Producers: Rick Nowels; Richard Feldman; Eric Pressly; David Munday

Belinda Carlisle chronology
Runaway Horses (1989)	Live Your Life Be Free (1991)	The Best of Belinda, Volume 1 (1992)

Singles from Live Your Life Be Free
- 1. "Live Your Life Be Free" Released: September 16, 1991; 2. "Do You Feel Like I Feel?" Released: November 1991; 3. "Half the World" Released: December 1991; 4. "Little Black Book" Released: August 1992

Live Your Life Be Free is the fourth studio album by American singer Belinda Carlisle, released in 1991 by MCA Records in North America and Virgin Records globally. This was the first of Carlisle's albums not to appear on the US Billboard charts (although it did chart on the rival Cash Box charts). The album was also the last of hers to produce a US Billboard Hot 100 single ("Do You Feel Like I Feel?", number 73). The album fared better in the UK, where it peaked at number seven.

Carlisle co-wrote two of the tracks on the album: "Loneliness Game" and "Little Black Book" (which went to number 28 on the UK Singles Chart).

The song "You Came Out of Nowhere" begins with a sample from the opening of "Nobody Told Me", a song by John Lennon that was released in 1984.

Live Your Life Be Free was re-released on August 26, 2013, in a 2CD+DVD casebook edition from Edsel Records, featuring the original album remastered, as well as single versions, remixes and B-sides. The DVD features the videos from the album and an exclusive interview with Carlisle discussing the album.

== Reception ==
Professional ratings
Review scores
Source	Rating
AllMusic	3/5 stars
Calgary Herald	C−
Classic Pop	4/5 stars
Entertainment Weekly	C−
Q	3/5 stars
Record Collector	3/5 stars
Retro Pop	5/5 stars
Rolling Stone	2/5 stars
Smash Hits	8/10
Vox	7/10

Billboard called Live Your Life Be Free "pleasantly engaging" and "much more consistent" than its 1989 predecessor Runaway Horses, noting that it "shows Carlisle's vocal growth as she stretches with different styles." Cashbox remarked that "you might notice a certain maturity coming from the girl who sang 'We Got the Beat' 10 years ago-go", describing the album as "a slight departure" from Carlisle's previous albums and noting her songwriting contributions on "Little Black Book" and "Loneliness Game".

Deborah Kirk of Rolling Stone was more critical, finding that "while her vocal technique has improved, her taste in songs has changed very little", and adding, "Every track ... is a love song, a problem for the listener looking for depth or diversity. Carlisle's biggest shortcoming, however, is a failure to impart any real feeling to the words she sings ... Carlisle merely stirs up a nostalgia for carefree girl groups singing gooey love songs – giving Live Your Life a certain giddy, pointless coherence."

In a retrospective review, Justin Kantor of AllMusic said that Live Your Life Be Free found Carlisle adding "a bit of dance flavor to her signature pop/rock stylings" and showed her "to be capable in a variety of musical contexts, and is a pleasing listen throughout." Steve Harnell of Classic Pop noted that "the two-pronged songwriting team of Nowels and Shipley feature throughout here but the material ... lacks the bite of Heaven on Earth and Runaway Horses ... There is plenty to enjoy here, though, from the upbeat pop-rocker of the title track with its oh-so-rawk guitars and the singalong jangle-pop of 'Do You Feel Like I Feel?', which comes with a de rigueur early-90s electric sitar solo."

== Commercial performance ==
The album sold better outside the U.S. and managed to enter the top 10 in the UK, where it was certified gold. Outside the UK the album charted No. 21 in Sweden for 10 weeks and No. 27 in Australia.

The first single release outside the United States was the album title track, which peaked at No. 11 in Italy, No. 12 in the UK, No. 16 in Sweden and No. 13 in Australia. In the U.S. the first single to be released was "Do You Feel Like I Feel?", which was the last Carlisle single to enter the U.S. top 100.

== Track listing ==
No.	Title	Writer(s)	Length
1.	"Live Your Life Be Free"	Rick Nowels, Ellen Shipley	5:14
2.	"Do You Feel Like I Feel?"	Nowels, Shipley	5:09
3.	"Half the World"	Richard Feldman, Eric Pressly, Shipley	4:23
4.	"You Came Out of Nowhere"	Nowels, David Munday	4:10
5.	"You're Nothing Without Me"	Nowels	3:55
6.	"I Plead Insanity"	Nowels, Munday, Kushla Prasad	4:39
7.	"Emotional Highway"	Nowels, Shipley	5:20
8.	"Little Black Book"	Feldman, Marcy Detroit, Belinda Carlisle	4:14
9.	"Love Revolution"	Nowels	5:09
10.	"World of Love"	Charlotte Caffey, Jeff McDonald, Steve McDonald	4:13
11.	"Loneliness Game"	Pressly, Carlisle	4:40

=== 2013 remastered deluxe version ===
Disc one
No.	Title	Writer(s)	Length
12.	"Live Your Life Be Free" (single edit)	Nowels, Shipley	4:22
13.	"Do You Feel Like I Feel" (single edit)	Nowels, Shipley	4:14
14.	"I Plead Insanity" (single mix)	Nowels, Munday, Kushla Prasad	4:11
15.	"Live Your Life Be Free" (radio edit)	Nowels, Shipley	4:20

Disc two
No.	Title	Writer(s)	Length
1.	"Live Your Life Be Free" (Club Mix)	Rick Nowels, Ellen Shipley	5:31
2.	"Little Black Book" (Little Black Mix)	Richard Feldman, Marcy Detroit, Belinda Carlisle	5:16
3.	"Do You Feel Like I Feel" (Dance Mix)	Nowels, Shipley	5:33
4.	"I Plead Insanity" (Extended 12″)	Nowels, David Munday, Kushla Prasad	6:12
5.	"Live Your Life Be Free" (Extended)	Nowels, Shipley	5:47
6.	"Little Black Book" (Belinda’s in the House Mix)	Feldman, Detroit, Carlisle	4:56
7.	"Live Your Life Be Free" (House Mix)	Nowels, Shipley	6:09
8.	"I Plead Insanity" (Remix/Dub Mix)	Nowels, Munday, Prasad	4:51
9.	"Only a Dream" (B-side)	Caffey, Carlisle, Feldman	3:10
10.	"The Air You Breathe" (B-side)	Donna Weiss, David White	4:29

Disc three DVD
No.	Title	Length
1.	"Live Your Life Be Free" (video)	4:28
2.	"Do You Feel Like I Feel" (video)	4:10
3.	"Half the World" (video)	4:15
4.	"I Plead Insanity" (video)	4:07
5.	"Little Black Book" (video)	4:16
6.	"Interview with Belinda conducted by Mark Goodier"	8:11

== Personnel ==
- Belinda Carlisle – lead vocals
- Charles Judge – keyboards (1, 2, 4–9), drum programming (2, 5, 7, 9)
- Rick Nowels – arrangements (1, 2, 4–7, 9), keyboards (1, 2, 7), 12-string acoustic guitar (1), backing vocals (4, 6, 9), surf guitars (7), acoustic guitar (8), 6-string guitar (8), 12-string guitar (8)
- Kevin Savigar – keyboards (3, 8)
- David Munday – arrangements (4, 6), keyboards (4, 6), drum programming (4, 6), backing vocals (4, 6, 9)
- Kim Bullard – keyboards (10, 11)
- Michael Landau – guitars (1–3, 5–8, 10, 11), sitar solo (2)
- Ben Schultz – guitars (1, 4), drum programming (1)
- Rusty Anderson – guitars (3, 8)
- Eric Bazilian – mandolin (3)
- Paul Jackson Jr. – guitars (4)
- Dave Alvin – guitars (8)
- Jon Ingoldsby – additional guitars (10)
- T.J. Parker – guitar solo (11)
- John Pierce – bass (1, 7)
- Eric Pressly – bass (3, 8, 10, 11)
- Denny Fongheiser – drums (3, 10, 11), drum samples (10)
- Stan Lynch – drums (3), percussion (8)
- Kenny Aronoff – percussion (3), drums (8)
- Luis Conte – percussion (4)
- Michael Kamen – oboe (3)
- Patrick Seymour – orchestration (3), string arrangements (8)
- Sachi McHenry – cello (8)
- Charlie Bisharat – violin (8)
- Juliann French – violin (8)
- Valerie Pinkston – backing vocals (1, 2, 5–7, 9)
- Ellen Shipley – backing vocals (1, 2, 4, 5, 7, 10)
- Maria Vidal – backing vocals (1, 2, 4–7, 9, 10)
- Gia Ciambotti – backing vocals (3, 8)
- Sheryl Crow – backing vocals (3, 8, 10)
- Debra Parson – backing vocals (3, 8, 11)
- Edie Lehmann – backing vocals (4)
- Diana Graselli – backing vocals (5, 6, 9)
- Tom Kelly – backing vocals (6)
- Nadirah Ali – backing vocals (8)
- Marcy Levy – backing vocals (8)
- Naomi Star – backing vocals (8, 11)

== Production ==
- Producers – Rick Nowels (Tracks 1, 2, 4–7, 9, 10 & 11); Richard Feldman (Tracks 3 & 8); David Munday (Tracks 4 & 6); Eric Pressly (Tracks 10 & 11).
- Engineers – John Kovarek (Tracks 1, 2, 4, 5, 7 & 9); Greg Droman and Ross Hogarth (Tracks 3 & 8); Jon Ingoldsby (Tracks 3, 8, 10 & 11); Peter Arata (Tracks 4 & 6); Jim Reinhardt (Track 10); Steve Rinkoff (Track 11).
- Additional Engineer on Track 5 – Peter Arata
- Mixing – Steve MacMillan (Tracks 1 & 2); Mick Guzauski (Tracks 2 & 4); Peter Arata (Tracks 3, 5, 8, 10 & 11); Ken Kessie (Track 6); Mark DeSisto (Track 9).
- Mix Assistant – Danny Alonso
- Mixed at Cherokee Studios and Larrabee Sound Studios (Hollywood, CA); Lighthouse Studios (Los Angeles, CA); Can-Am Recorders (Tarzana, CA).
- Mastered by Stephen Marcussen at Precision Lacquer (Hollywood, CA).
- Art Direction – Nick Egan
- Design – Nick Egan and Eric Roinestad
- Illustration – Kathryn Otoshi
- Photography – Grant Matthews
- Still Life Photo – Michele Laurita
- Management – Larry Goldberg and Ron Stone
- Hair – Katarina Erhardt
- Make-up – Paul Starr
- Stylist – Jeannine Braden

== Charts ==
=== Weekly charts ===
Weekly chart performance for Live Your Life Be Free
Chart	Peak position
Australian Albums (ARIA)	27
Canada Top Albums/CDs (RPM)	80
European Albums (Music & Media)	23
Finnish Albums (Suomen virallinen lista)	31
Japanese Albums (Oricon)	32
Swedish Albums (Sverigetopplistan)	21
Swiss Albums (Schweizer Hitparade)	32
UK Albums (Official Charts)	7
US Cash Box Top 200 Albums	143
Scottish Albums (Official Charts)	99

=== Year-end charts ===
Year-end chart performance for Live Your Life Be Free
Chart (1991)	Position
UK Albums (OCC)	78

== Certifications ==
Certifications for Live Your Life Be Free
Region	Certification	Certified units/sales
United Kingdom (BPI)	Gold	100,000^{^}
^{^} Shipments figures based on certification alone.
