= Searching (INXS song) =

Single by INXS

from the album Elegantly Wasted
- Released: 22 September 1997
- Recorded: 1997
- Genre: Rock
- Length: 4:05
- Label: Mercury
- Songwriter(s): Michael Hutchence, Andrew Farriss
- Producer(s): Bruce Fairbairn

INXS singles chronology
| "Don't Lose Your Head" (1997) | "Searching" (1997) | "Tight" (2002) |

"Searching" is the fourth single from the album Elegantly Wasted by INXS. It was never officially released although scheduled for the UK market. The song was written by Michael Hutchence and Andrew Farriss and recorded by the band in Dublin during the summer of 1996. It is also the final single to feature original lead vocalist Michael Hutchence, who died exactly two months after the song was released.

== Trivia ==
The song was previewed several months before the album's release in September 1996 at the Australian ARIA Music Awards.

Due to record company red tape, "Searching", the scheduled third single from Elegantly Wasted, was never commercially released.

According to a Mercury Records spokesman, a minimal quantity of around 2,000 copies of each disc were pressed for promotional purposes, but upon the single's retraction all available copies were destroyed. Inevitably, a relatively small and unknown quantity of the discs had already been circulated thus making the singles very attractive collector's items – especially as a complete set. However, most of the actual recordings and remixes have since appeared elsewhere on other promo items.

== B-sides ==
As well as the new mixes of "Searching", the CD singles included further live tracks from the Aspen show and two Acoustic performances at BBC Radio 1 of "I'm Just a Man" and "Never Tear Us Apart".

== Video ==
The video for "Searching" was directed by longtime collaborator Nick Egan, and it was the last that the band worked on before Hutchence's death. "Searching" was shot in San Francisco at the end of July 1997 and was, unusually, set to the 'Leadstation Radio Mix' of the song, not the album version.

The narrative of the video is of the band "Searching" the streets for the girl who appears on the front cover of the 'Elegantly Wasted' album, video and single.

== Track listings ==
CD Promo – MECP319 – Mercury/US

1. Searching (Leadstation Radio Mix)
2. Searching (LP version)

CD Promo – INXCJ30 – Mercury/UK

1. Searching (Leadstation Radio Mix)
2. Searching (LP version)

CD5 – INXCD30 – Mercury/UK (withdrawn)

1. Searching (Leadstation Radio Mix)
2. Searching (LP version)
3. Searching (Alex Reece Drum and Bass Mix)
4. Searching (Linslee Campbell R&B Mix)

CD5 – INXD30 – Mercury/UK (withdrawn)

1. Searching (Leadstation Funk Workout)
2. Searching (Live in Aspen '97)
3. Elegantly Wasted (Live in Aspen '97)
4. Need You Tonight (Live in Aspen '97)

CD5 – INXDD30 – Mercury/UK (withdrawn)

1. Searching (Leadstation Main Mix)
2. Searching (Bosch Mix)
3. I'm Just a Man (acoustic live – Radio One, 20 May 1997)
4. Never Tear Us Apart (acoustic live – Radio One, 20 May 1997)
