= Big Scary Animal =

1993 single by Belinda Carlisle

Single by Belinda Carlisle

from the album Real
- B-side: "Windows of the World"
- Released: September 13, 1993
- Length: 4:08
- Label: Virgin
- Songwriters: Charlotte Caffey; Belinda Carlisle; Ralph Schuckett
- Producer: Ralph Schuckett

Belinda Carlisle singles chronology
"Little Black Book" (1992)	"Big Scary Animal" (1993)	"Lay Down Your Arms" (1993)

Music video
- "Big Scary Animal" on YouTube

"Big Scary Animal" (titled "It's Too Real (Big Scary Animal)" in the United States and Japan) is a song written by American singer-songwriter Belinda Carlisle with Charlotte Caffey and Ralph Schuckett, and produced by Schuckett for Carlisle's fifth studio album, Real (1993). The song was released on September 13, 1993, by Virgin Records, as the album's lead single. The single was released with three B-sides: album track "Windows of the World" as well as "Change" and "Too Much Water", which are eight-track demos. "Big Scary Animal" peaked at number 12 on the UK Singles Chart, reached number 26 in Iceland, and became a minor hit in Australia, Canada, and Germany. Three music videos were produced for the song.

== Critical reception ==
Alan Jones from Music Week gave the song four out of five, writing, "Belinda's quirky upfront vocal style suits this acoustically jangling song which cames complete with appropriate jungle motifs via drums and sound effects. Tougher than a lot of her whimsical singles and a promising taster for her Real album." Push, writing for Melody Maker, could hear elements of the J. Geils Band's "Centerfold", Men Without Hats' "The Safety Dance", Adam and the Ants' "Kings of the Wild Frontier" and Dinosaur Jr.'s "Freak Scene" in the track. He felt that such influences would be "a recipe for disaster", but noted the song's catchiness, commenting that "having played this record just the once, I can't stop humming it."

== Music video ==
There are three versions of the accompanying music video for "Big Scary Animal": the international UK video (directed by French filmmaker Michel Gondry), the director's cut, and US version (directed by Jim Gable).

== Track listings ==
- US cassette single

Japanese mini-CD single

1. "It's Too Real (Big Scary Animal)" – 4:08
2. "Windows of the World" – 3:26
- Non-US 7-inch and cassette single

European CD single

1. "Big Scary Animal"
2. "Windows of the World"
- UK CD single
1. "Big Scary Animal"
2. "Windows of the World"
3. "Change" (8 track demo)
4. "Too Much Water" (8 track demo)
- European maxi-CD and Australian CD single
1. "Big Scary Animal"
2. "Windows of the World"
3. "Change" (8 track demo)

== Charts ==
Chart (1993)	Peak position
Australia (ARIA)	56
Canada Top Singles (RPM)	70
Europe (Eurochart Hot 100)	40
European Hit Radio (Music & Media)	15
Germany (GfK)	63
Iceland (Íslenski Listinn Topp 40)	26
Israel (Israeli Singles Chart)	8
Quebec (ADISQ)	21
UK Singles (Official Charts)	12
UK Airplay (Music Week)	7

== Release history ==
Region	Date	Format(s)	Label(s)	Ref.
United Kingdom	September 13, 1993	7-inch vinyl; CD; cassette	Virgin; Offside	
Australia	October 4, 1993	CD; cassette	Virgin; Offside	
Japan	October 20, 1993	Mini-CD	Virgin; Offside	
