= Gia Ciambotti =

American singer

- Born: September 13, 1962 (age 62); California
- Occupation: singer
- Member of: The Forest Rangers

Gia Ciambotti (born September 13, 1962 in Hollywood, California) is an American singer, and the daughter of John Ciambotti, bassist for the band Clover. She first came to prominence in the late 1980s as a member of the band The Graces, with Charlotte Caffey and Meredith Brooks. The group released the album Perfect View in 1989 and had a Billboard Hot 100 hit with the single "Lay Down Your Arms". The group disbanded in the early 1990s.

In 1992, Gia Ciambotti joined Bruce Springsteen as a backing vocalist for his Bruce Springsteen and the "Other Band" Tour. Since then she has worked as a session singer for artists such as Lucinda Williams, Natalie Cole, Chicago and others. She also performed with a group called The Scarletts (who were originally called BooBoo Fine Jelly).

In 2004, she released her first album in collaboration with Ned Albright. Titled Snowflake, it is a collection of traditional and original lullabies for children. 2007 saw the release of her first proper solo album, Right As Rain. She is the daughter of bassist John Ciambotti.

== Discography ==
- Snowflake (with Ned Albright & Friends) (2004)
- Right as Rain (2007)
