= Ellen Shipley =

American musician and songwriter (born 1949)

Ellen Shipley (born March 24, 1949, in New York City, New York, United States) is an American musician and songwriter.

== Career ==
At sixteen years old, Shipley got a NYC Cabaret license. She performed in a duo act in Greenwich Village, New York City, in the early 1970's with Steve Fields. Shipley was noticed by a Tommy Mottola associate, in a jazz club in New York, Pearl’s Place, and signed to Mottola's company as a recording artist.

From 1979 to 1983, she recorded three solo albums of her own songs (see discography below); Shipley has also collaborated with Ralph Schuckett, and appeared on December 13, 1980 on Saturday Night Live TV program. Paste magazine archived, for playback, a 12-song performance by her at Paradise club in Boston on October 17, 1980.

She is best known for her work with Rick Nowels. Nowels, who had just gotten his big break writing songs with singer Stevie Nicks, one of his old friends, approached Shipley in a Woodstock, New York cafe and asked her to write with him for Belinda Carlisle's first solo album. Together they worked on the Carlisle's albums Belinda, Heaven on Earth, Runaway Horses, and Live Your Life Be Free.

"My Song Was Played 3.1 Million Times on Pandora. My Check Was $39..."

The couple had also written for other artists, such as English singer Kim Wilde.

Shipley also wrote, with Nicky Holland, the song "Will We Ever Learn", which was recorded for Oleta Adams, and included on Adams' album Circle of One, released in 1990.

In 1994, Shipley was nominated for a Grammy Award (Best R&B Song) for "Body and Soul", written with Nowels for Anita Baker. Also in the same year, in Great Performances episode September Songs: The Music of Kurt Weill, she, together with Ralph Schuckett, David Johansen and Bob Dorough, sang "Alabama Song" in a beat-up old pickup truck in search of whiskey.

In 2008, Shipley directed a stage play titled Desert Sunrise, by Misha Shulman, in Los Angeles.

== Personal life ==
Shipley is from Canarsie, Brooklyn, and married Ralph Schuckett. She studied theater at Hunter College.

== Discography ==
=== Studio albums ===
==== Ellen Shipley (1979) ====
- Track list and credits taken from U.S. vinyl pressing.
- Produced by Ralph Schuckett and Ed Sprigg.

No.	Title	Writer(s)	Length
1.	"I Surrender"	Ellen Shipley; Ralph Schuckett	4:24
2.	"Man of the World"	Shipley; Shuckett	3:35
3.	"Catch the Cobra"	Shipley; Shuckett	3:45
4.	"Heroes of Yesterday"	Shipley	5:08
5.	"Good Thing Goin'"	Shipley; Shuckett	3:31
6.	"I'm Jumping Out of My Skin"	Shipley; Shuckett	2:54
7.	"Little Sister"	Shipley; Shuckett	3:01
8.	"Last Tears"	Shipley; Shuckett	4:22
9.	"Stray Dog"	Shipley; Shuckett	4:34
10.	"Over the Edge"	Shipley	3:33

==== Breaking Through the Ice Age (1980) ====
- Track list and credits taken from U.S. vinyl pressing.
- Produced by David Tickle.

No.	Title	Writer(s)	Length
1.	"Heart to Heart"	Ellen Shipley; Ralph Shuckett	3:39
2.	"Fotogenic"	Shipley; Shuckett	3:32
3.	"Jamie"	Shipley; Shuckett	3:25
4.	"This Little Girl"	Shipley; Shuckett	3:32
5.	"Talk Don't Shout"	Shipley; Richie Cerniglia; Nicholas Lynn	3:43
6.	"Solo"	Shipley	4:04
7.	"Lost Without Your Love"	Shipley; Cerniglia	5:50
8.	"Promise to Keep"	Shipley; Shuckett	4:03
9.	"Living for the Tenderness"	Shipley; Shuckett	7:00

Reissued on CD in 2018 with five bonus tracks:

- "We All Want What We Can't Have" – 4:07
- "Sitting Duck" – 4:53
- "It's All Over Now" – 3:30
- "She Stands Alone" – 4:16
- "Fever" – 4:37

==== Call of the Wild (1983) ====
- Track list and credits taken from U.S. vinyl pressing.
- Produced by Morrie Brown.

No.	Title	Writer(s)	Length
1.	"Heart Out of Time"	Ellen Shipley; Morrie Brown; Lloyd Landesman	4:08
2.	"Love's Out On the Line"	Shipley; Brown	4:08
3.	"Stranded"	Shipley	4:25
4.	"I Come Undone"	Shipley; Brown	3:58
5.	"Look the Other Way"	Shipley; Sid McGinnis	3:12
6.	"Call of the Wild"	Shipley; Brown; Ralph Schuckett; Rick Nowels	4:25
7.	"Let Me Take You Under"	Shipley; McGinnis	3:56
8.	"He's Not There" (The Zombies cover)	Rod Argent	3:44
9.	"Fugitive Kind"	Shipley; Schuckett	4:13

Reissued on CD in 2018 with eight bonus tracks:

- "Heart to Heart" (Live) – 3:44
- "Fotogenic" (Live) – 3:45
- "This Little Girl" (Live) – 4:15
- "Solo" (Live) – 4:17
- "I Surrender" (Live) – 4:40
- "Promise to Keep" (Live) – 5:14
- "Some Kind of Wonderful" (Live) – 11:15
- "Catch the Cobra" (Live) – 4:30

=== Singles ===
- "I Surrender"/"Little Sister" (1979)
- "Man of the World"/"Heroes of Yesterday" (1979)
- "Catch the Cobra"/"Little Sister" (1979)
- "This Little Girl"/"Promise to Keep" (1980)
- "Love's On the Line"/"Let Me Take You Under" (1983)
- "Heart Out of Time"/"I Come Undone" (1983)

=== Songwriting ===
- “Spirit Of Love”, Laura Branigan, Touch (1987)
- “I Come Undone”, Jennifer Rush, Heart Over Mind (1987)
- Belinda Carlisle, Heaven On Earth (1987)
  - “Heaven Is A Place On Earth”
  - “Circle In The Sand”
- “The Real Feel”, Maria Vidal, Maria Vidal (1987)
- “Confess”, Eric Martin, I'm Only Fooling Myself (1987)
- The Graces, Perfect View (1989)
  - “Lay Down Your Arms”
  - “When The Sun Goes Down”
  - “Perfect View”
  - “Fear No Love”
  - “50,000 Candles Burning”
- Belinda Carlisle, Runaway Horses (1989)
  - “Leave A Light On”
  - “Runaway Horses”
  - Vision of You"
  - “La Luna”
  - (We Want) The Same Thing
  - "Whatever It Takes"
- “Will We Ever Learn”, Oleta Adams, Circle Of One (1990)
- Belinda Carlisle, Live Your Life Be Free (1991)
  - “Live Your Life Be Free”
  - “Do You Feel Like I Feel?”
  - “Half The World”
  - “Emotional Highway”
- “Love Is Holy”, Kim Wilde, Love Is (1992)
- “Tongue-Tied And Twisted”, Nicky Holland, Nicky Holland (1992)
- Jennifer Rush, Jennifer Rush (1992)
  - “Vision Of You”
  - “Unwanted Child”
- “Sail Away”, Dionne Warwick, ‘Til Their Eyes Shine…The Lullaby Album (1992)
- “C’est Mieux Que D’aimer”, Mario Pelchat, Pelchat (1993)
- Belinda Carlisle, Real (1993)
  - Lay Down Your Arms"
  - "One With You"
- “Vision Of You”, Lea Salonga, Lea Salonga (1993)
- "Look At Me", Keely Hawkes, Just A Page (1993)
- “Body And Soul”, Anita Baker, Rhythm Of Love (1994)
- “These Lovin’ Eyes”, David Hasselhoff, Du (1994), David Hasselhoff (1995)
- “Remember September”, Belinda Carlisle, A Woman & A Man (1996)
- "Since I Laid Eyes On You", Faith Hill, Piece Of My Heart (1996)

“Live Forever”, Midge Ure, Breathe (1996)

- “Look At Me”, Trine Rein, Beneath My Skin (1996)
- “Sex Will Keep Us Together”, Divinyls, Underworld (1996)
- “Yearbook”, Hanson, Middle Of Nowhere (1997)
- "Just In Case", Erikah Karst, Grown Woman (1997)
- “Thinking Of You (I Drive Myself Crazy)”, ‘NSYNC, ‘Nsync (1998)
- Beyond Pink, Beyond Pink (1999)
  - "Boys Will Be Boys"
  - "Girl Of Today"
  - "Wonderland"
  - "One Love, True Love"
  - "Rainbow"
- "Does She Think About Me", Damon Johnson, (2000)
- “You Don’t Have To Be Alone”, Jacob Young, Jacob Young (2001)
- "I Believe", Wendy Wright, (2007)
- “Goodbye Just Go”, Belinda Carlisle, (2014)
- “A Million Miles Away”, Tiffany, (2016)
