= Real (Belinda Carlisle album) =

Studio album by Belinda Carlisle
- Released: September 29, 1993
- Studios: American Recording Co. (North Hollywood, California); Ocean Way Recording (Hollywood, California); The Clubhouse and Record One (Los Angeles, California); Kiva West (Encino, California); Saturn Sound (Studio City, California)
- Genre: Pop rock
- Length: 47:30
- Label: Virgin
- Producers: Charlotte Caffey; Thomas Caffey; Belinda Carlisle; Ralph Schuckett

Belinda Carlisle chronology
The Best of Belinda, Volume 1 (1992)	Real (1993)	A Woman & a Man (1996)

Singles from Real
- 1. "Big Scary Animal" Released: September 13, 1993; 2. "Lay Down Your Arms" Released: November 15, 1993

Real is the fifth studio album by American singer Belinda Carlisle, released on September 29, 1993, by Virgin Records. The album has a genre of mainly pop songs written by Charlotte Caffey, Thomas Caffey, Ralph Schuckett and half co-written by Carlisle. It was the second Belinda Carlisle album where Rick Nowels had no writing or producing credits and was also Carlisle's first album where she contributed to the producing. The album cover was designed by Tom Dolan and is a departure for Carlisle, who presented a glamorous look on all her previous covers, choosing a "jeans and tee shirt" look instead this time without make-up. The album features a cover version of the Graces' song "Lay Down Your Arms". Former Germs guitarist Pat Smear, as well as Redd Kross members Jeff and Steve McDonald, and The Bangles' Vicki Peterson appear on the record.

Real was re-released by Edsel Recording on August 26, 2013, as a two CD plus DVD casebook. It features the original album re-mastered, the single versions, demos, remixes, and live tracks. The DVD features the videos from the album and an exclusive interview with Carlisle, discussing the album.

== Reception ==
Professional ratings
Review scores
Source	Rating
AllMusic	2/5 stars
Entertainment Weekly	A−
Los Angeles Times	2.5/4 stars
Music Week	4/5 stars
Smash Hits	2/5 stars

Cashbox selected the album as their 'Pick of the Week', noting that "the former Go Go's vocalist issues her fifth and arguably best solo album, a collection whose stripped-down feel and comfortable attitude marks a welcome return to Carlisle's early-'80s style. All 10 songs on Real deal, in one way or another with love, though various songwriting and production teams manage to avoid redundancies, keeping the overall reeling fresh and light. Carlisle even experiments with different vocal approaches, notably on the sweet "Where Love Hides" and first single "It's Too Real (Big Scary Animal)".

AllMusic felt the album suffers from a lack of memorable songs and while the record sounded good, it had nothing to support the state-of-the-art production. It was also a departure from her previous solo albums, having more in common with Carlisle's the Go-Go's sound rather than her own, typical, solo pop themes. Dealing with what Carlisle termed the "dark side of relationships", the album is mature and intentionally lacks the slick production of her other solo albums. Carlisle won over many critics who had previously reviewed her for her sensed lack of progression and willingness to take a chance with some edgier material.

Retrospectively, in 2020, Steve Harnell of Classic Pop called it "another game-changer for Carlisle, as significant in its own way to her evolution as a solo artist as Heaven On Earth...A new studio methodology was adopted with the majority of tracks on Real written to drum loops. The headline news was that Rick Nowels was dispensed with as a main songwriter although the services of Ellen Shipley were retained on two tracks. Carlisle was very much running the show, though."

== Commercial performance ==
Real debuted on the UK Albums Chart at number nine on October 18, 1993, becoming Carlisle's fifth consecutive top-10 album there. The following week, it dropped down 11 places to number 20 and spent five weeks in the top 75. In Sweden, the album became her fifth top-30 album, peaking at number 23, spending only two weeks in the top 50. Australia was the last place the album charted, where it charted at number 61 and spent four weeks in the top 100.

Released in September 1993, the single "Big Scary Animal" reached number 12 on the UK Singles Chart, becoming Carlisle's seventh top-20 single, and a top 60 hit in Australia. This is also the most successful song co-written by Belinda Carlisle. "Lay Down Your Arms" was released as the second single in November 1993 and failed to gain much success, peaking at number 27 in the UK.

== Track listing ==
No.	Title	Writer(s)	Length
1.	"Goodbye Day"	Charlotte Caffey, Thomas Caffey, Jeff McDonald, Steven Shane McDonald	4:39
2.	"Big Scary Animal"	Caffey, Belinda Carlisle, Ralph Schuckett	4:08
3.	"Too Much Water"	Caffey, Caffey, Richard Caffey, Carlisle	5:16
4.	"Lay Down Your Arms"	Caffey, Schuckett, Ellen Shipley	4:38
5.	"Where Love Hides"	Schuckett	4:57
6.	"One with You"	Caffey, Schuckett, Shipley	5:11
7.	"Wrap My Arms"	Caffey, Caffey, Carlisle	4:27
8.	"Tell Me"	Caffey, Caffey, Carlisle	5:32
9.	"Windows of the World"	Caffey, Caffey, Carlisle	3:26
10.	"Here Comes My Baby"	Gregg Alexander, Caffey, Carlisle	4:37

=== 2013 remastered deluxe edition ===
Disc one
No.	Title	Writer(s)	Length
11.	"Lay Down Your Arms" (single edit)	Caffey, Schuckett, Shipley	4:10
12.	"Heaven Is a Place on Earth" (Dyme Brothers 7” Mix)	Rick Nowels, Shipley	3:36
13.	"All God's Children" (edit)	Paul Barry, Billy Lawrie, Mark Taylor	3:05
14.	"A Prayer for Everyone" (edit)	Marie-Claire D'Ubaldo, Nowels, Billy Steinberg	3:51
15.	"Heaven Is a Place on Earth" (Dyme Brothers 12” Mix)	Nowels, Shipley	4:59

Disc two
No.	Title	Writer(s)	Length
1.	"Whatcha Doin' to Me" (demo)	Caffey, Caffey, Carlisle	3:14
2.	"Don’t Cry" (demo)	Caffey, Caffey, Carlisle	3:14
3.	"Change" (demo)		4:38
4.	"Too Much Water" (demo)	Caffey, Caffey, Caffey, Carlisle	4:18
5.	"Wrap My Arms" (demo)	Caffey, Caffey, Carlisle	4:32
6.	"Here Comes My Baby" (demo)	Alexander, Caffey, Carlisle	4:39
7.	"Feels Like I’ve Known You Forever" (from A Place on Earth: The Greatest Hits)	David Munday	3:48
8.	"A Prayer for Everyone" (from A Place on Earth: The Greatest Hits)	D'Ubaldo, Nowels, Steinberg	4:21
9.	"All God’s Children" (from A Place on Earth: The Greatest Hits)	Barry, Lawrie, Taylor	3:48
10.	"I Feel Free" (live)	Jack Bruce, Pete Brown	5:12
11.	"Circle in the Sand" (live)	Nowels, Shipley	4:50
12.	"Heaven Is a Place on Earth" (live)	Nowels, Shipley	4:55

Disc three (DVD)
No.	Title	Length
1.	"Big Scary Animal (U.K. version)" (video)	4:12
2.	"Lay Down Your Arms" (video)	4:11
3.	"All God’s Children" (video)	3:47
4.	"Big Scary Animal (U.S. version)" (video)	4:24
5.	"Interview with Belinda conducted by Mark Goodier"	22:29

== Personnel ==
Vocals

- Belinda Carlisle
- Charlotte Caffey
- Thomas Caffey
- Vicki Peterson

Musicians

- Charlie Clouser – keyboards, drum programming
- Ralph Schuckett – keyboards, string arrangements
- C.J. Vanston – keyboards, programming
- Chris Garcia – keyboards, programming
- Charlotte Caffey – guitars
- Rick DiFonzo – guitars
- Eddy Kurdziel – guitars
- Jeff McDonald – guitars
- Tim Pierce – guitars
- Pat Smear – guitars
- Steven Shane McDonald – bass
- Eric Pressly – bass
- Kevin Wyatt – bass
- Tal Bergman – drums, percussion
- Greg Morrow – drums, percussion
- Bill Quinn – drums, percussion
- Luis Conte – percussion
- Dave McNair – percussion
- Suzie Katayama – cello
- Thomas Caffey – string arrangements

== Production ==
- Ralph Schuckett – executive producer, producer (1, 2, 4–6, 8)
- Belinda Carlisle – producer (1, 3, 7, 9, 10)
- Charlotte Caffey – producer (1, 3, 7, 9, 10)
- Thomas Caffey – producer (1), additional producer (3, 7, 9, 10)
- Dave McNair – recording, mixing (2–7, 9)
- Steve Churchyard – mixing (1, 3, 8, 10)
- Ken Allardyce, John Boutin, Jeff DeMorris, Chris Garcia, Frank Gryner, Efren Herrera, Todd Judge, Matt Westfield and Howard Willing – assistant engineers
- Stephen Marcussen – mastering at Precision Mastering (Hollywood, California)
- Marsha Burns – production coordinator
- Carrie McConkey – production coordinating assistant
- Len Peltier – art direction
- Tom Dolan – design
- Victoria Pearson – photography
- Tom Anctil – project coordinator
- Ron Stone – management

== Charts ==
Chart performance for Real
Chart (1993)	Peak position
Australian Albums (ARIA)	61
European Albums (Music & Media)	50
Japanese Albums (Oricon)	26
Swedish Albums (Sverigetopplistan)	23
UK Albums (Official Charts)	9

== Release history ==
Release dates and formats for Real
Region	Date	Format	Label	Catalog
Japan	September 29, 1993	CD; cassette	EMI	VJCP-28185
United States	October 5, 1993	CD; cassette	Virgin	V2-39102
United Kingdom	October 11, 1993	CD; LP	Virgin	CDV2725
Australia	November 14, 1993	CD	Virgin	839102-2
