= Betweenness =

Betweenness is a noun derived from the proposition between. It may refer to:

- The ternary relation of intermediacy or betweenness, a feature of ordered geometry.
- Betweenness problem - an algorithmic problem. The input is a collection of ordered triples of items; the task is to decide whether there is a single total order such that, for each of the given triples, the middle item in the triple appears in the output somewhere between the other two items.
- Betweenness centrality - a measure of centrality in a graph, based on shortest paths. The betweenness centrality of a vertex is the number of shortest paths that pass through the vertex.
- Metric betweenness - given a metric d, a point y is said to be between x and z if all three points are distinct, and d(x,y)+d(y,z)=d(x,z). See convex metric space.

== See also ==
- Between (disambiguation)
- In Between (disambiguation)
