= Runaway Horses (song) =

1990 single by Belinda Carlisle

Single by Belinda Carlisle

from the album Runaway Horses
- B-side: "Heaven Is a Place on Earth" (live)
- Released: February 1990
- Length: 4:42
- Label: Virgin
- Songwriters: Rick Nowels; Ellen Shipley
- Producer: Rick Nowels

Belinda Carlisle singles chronology
"Summer Rain" (1990)	"Runaway Horses" (1990)	"Vision of You" (1990)

"Runaway Horses" is a song by American singer Belinda Carlisle. It was released as the fourth single (fifth in Japan) from her third album, Runaway Horses (1989), in February 1990. "Runaway Horses" reached the top 50 in Australia and the United Kingdom. The music video was directed by Greg Masuak.

== Critical reception ==
In review of February 17, 1990, Chris Roberts of Melody Maker referred to the single as "'Because the Night' without the good bits."

== Track listings ==
7-inch and cassette single

1. "Runaway Horses"
2. "Heaven Is a Place on Earth" (live at the Tower Theater, Philadelphia, May 1988)

12-inch, maxi-CD, and mini-CD single

1. "Runaway Horses"
2. "Heaven Is a Place on Earth" (live at the Tower Theater, Philadelphia, May 1988) – 4:53
3. "Circle in the Sand" (Beach Party mix) – 7:50

Japanese mini-album

1. "Runaway Horses" – 4:42
2. "La Luna" (extended dance mix) – 6:45
3. "Leave a Light On" (extended version) – 8:06
4. "I Feel Free" (live) – 5:07
5. "Circle in the Sand" (live) – 4:50
6. "Heaven Is a Place on Earth" (live) – 4:52

== Charts ==
Chart (1990)	Peak position
Australia (ARIA)	44
Europe (Eurochart Hot 100)	100
European Airplay (Music & Media)	38
UK Singles (Official Charts)	40
West Germany (GfK)	63

== Release history ==
Region	Date	Format(s)	Label(s)	Ref.
United Kingdom	February 1990	7-inch vinyl; 12-inch vinyl; CD; cassette	Virgin	
Japan	April 21, 1990	CD	Virgin	
Australia	May 28, 1990	7-inch vinyl; 12-inch vinyl; CD; cassette	Virgin	
