= Everything (INXS song) =

1997 single by INXS

Single by INXS

from the album Elegantly Wasted
- Released: 26 May 1997
- Recorded: Mid-1996
- Length: 3:12
- Label: Mercury
- Songwriter(s): Andrew Farriss, Michael Hutchence
- Producer(s): Bruce Fairbairn, Andrew Farriss

INXS singles chronology
"Elegantly Wasted" (1997)	"Everything" (1997)	"Don't Lose Your Head" (1997)

"Everything" is a song by Australian rock band INXS, released as the second single from their 10th studio album, Elegantly Wasted (1997). It was released only in Mexico, Europe, and Australia. The song was written by Michael Hutchence and Andrew Farriss and recorded by the band in Dublin in mid-1996.

== B-sides ==
The first CD single is a four-track live EP of tracks from INXS's performance for the BBC Comic Relief Charity in London, England. The B-sides on the second CD single include the song "Let It Ride", which was only included on the Japanese edition of the Elegantly Wasted album. There is also a 12-inch vinyl single with two mixes, one the "Jaxx club vocal" and the rare "Jaxx Love dub", available only on this format.

== Music video ==
The video for the single was shot on 26 April 1997 in Los Angeles at Ren-Mar Studios in Hollywood. It was directed by Paul Boyd and involves the band performing on a rotating stage with a "crowd" standing in a ring behind them.

== Track listings ==
12-inch single

1. "Everything" (Jaxx Club Vocal) – 6:39
2. "Everything" (Jaxx Love Dub)

CD1

1. "Everything" (Live) – 3:37
2. "Suicide Blonde" (Live) – 3:57
3. "Never Tear Us Apart" (Live) – 3:52
4. "What You Need" (Live) – 3:57

CD2

1. "Everything" – 3:12
2. "Let It Ride" – 3:46
3. "Girl on Fire" (Keepin' It Tight Mix) – 4:37
4. "Everything" (Jaxx Club Vocal) – 6:39

Cassette

1. "Everything" – 3:12
2. "Let It Ride" – 3:46

== Charts ==
Chart (1997)	Peak position
Australia (ARIA)	159
Scotland (OCC)	48
UK Singles (OCC)	71
