= Don't Lose Your Head (INXS song) =

Single by INXS

from the album Elegantly Wasted
- Released: 27 June 1997
- Recorded: 1997
- Genre: Rock
- Length: 3:30
- Label: Mercury
- Songwriters: Michael Hutchence, Andrew Farriss
- Producer: Bruce Fairbairn

INXS singles chronology
"Everything" (1997)	"Don't Lose Your Head" (1997)	"Searching" (1997)

"Don't Lose Your Head" is the third single from the album Elegantly Wasted by INXS. Released in Europe (Germany and The Netherlands) and Japan at the end of 1997. The song was written by Michael Hutchence and Andrew Farriss and recorded by the band in Dublin during the summer of 1996.

Although it was never officially released as a single in the United States, INXS released "Don't Lose Your Head" as a promo tie-in with 1997 film Face/Off. A Radio Edit version of the single was remixed by Tom Lord-Alge to clean up the opening lyrics; "You wake up in the morning with a starfuck for a friend" to "You wake up in the morning with a dealer for a friend".

== Background ==
According to an interview in the News of the World Sunday Magazine, the lyrics for "Don't Lose Your Head" were aimed squarely at "Oasis" frontman Liam Gallagher with whom Hutchence had many disagreements over the years.

Nicolas Cage was spotted at INXS' Montreal show for the Elegantly Wasted Tour on 25 September 1997. Hutchence dedicated "What You Need" and "Don't Lose Your Head" to the actor, and also climbed up to Cage's balcony during "Time".

=== Use in Face/Off ===
In addition to being used as a promotional tie-in song for Face/Off, the song itself plays on Castor Troy's (John Travolta) car radio as he is driving through Sean Archer's neighborhood for the first time with his new face.

== UK release ==
"Don’t Lose Your Head" was pressed as a UK promo single but, upon Hutchence's death, it was immediately withdrawn. Around 500 copies were originally pressed but destroyed almost instantly. Although the single did appear commercially in other territories such as Japan, its purpose for the UK market was primarily as a marketing tool for Face/Off. Again the single continued with the band's unique UK catalogue numbering system and received the number INXCJ31. With so few copies pressed in the first place, followed by the stock’s destruction, an extremely small number – estimated to be less than 50 – actually escaped the burner, thus making this the rarest INXS CD pressing of all time, even rarer than the withdrawn set of 3 UK CD singles of Searching which preceded it, that were due to be released but for Hutchence's death.

== B-sides ==
As well as the new mixes of "Don't Lose Your Head", the CD Singles included live versions of previous hits recorded on the Promotional Tour for the Elegantly Wasted album.

== Music video ==
A performance-style video was directed by Nick Egan and included clips from the movie. While on tour in South Africa, the band was asked by the producers of Face/Off to shoot a video for the song. The video was shot inside a large plane hangar on an airstrip located in Cape Town. Egan has also worked with INXS in the past on such projects as art direction and design on the X and Kick albums.

== Track listings ==
CD Promo – INXCJ31 – Mercury/UK (Withdrawn)

1. Don't Lose Your Head (Radio Mix) (3:34)
2. Don't Lose Your Head (Leadstation Solid Gold Mix) (4:27)

CD Promo – MECP 283 – Mercury/US

1. Don't Lose Your Head (Radio Edit) (3:34)
2. Don't Lose Your Head (LP Version) (4:02)

CD5 – 568 039-2 – Mercury/Australia/Europe

1. Don't Lose Your Head (Radio Mix) (4:02)
2. Don't Lose Your Head (Leadstation Solid Gold Mix) (4:27)
3. I'm Just a Man (Live in Belgium, 4 April 1997) (5:11)
4. Kiss the Dirt (Falling Down the Mountain) (Live in Belgium, 4 April 1997) (3:54)

CD – 568 038-2 Mercury/Europe

1. Don't Lose Your Head (Radio Mix) (3:34)
2. Don't Lose Your Head (Leadstation Solid Gold Mix) (4:27)

CD5 – PHCR-4073 – Mercury/Japan

1. Don't Lose Your Head (Radio Mix) (3:34)
2. Don't Lose Your Head (Leadstation Solid Gold Mix) (4:27)
3. Never Tear Us Apart (Acoustic Version) (2:31)
4. Elegantly Wasted (Live in Aspen 1997) (3:52)
5. Need You Tonight (Live in Aspen 1997) (3:06)
6. I'm Just a Man (Live in Belgium, 4 April 1997) (5:11)

== Charts ==
Chart (1997)	Peak position
Australia (ARIA Charts)	94
