= Inbetweener =

Inbetweener may refer to:

- "Inbetweener" (song), a song by Sleeper
- Inbetweener, an animator's assistant who performs the task of inbetweening
- In-Betweener, a fictional character in comic books published by Marvel Comics
- The Inbetweeners, a 2008–2010 British TV comedy series
  - The Inbetweeners Movie, a 2011 British film based on the TV series
    - The Inbetweeners 2, a 2014 British comedy film sequel to The Inbetweeners Movie
  - The Inbetweeners (U.S. TV series), a 2012 U.S. remake of the British TV series

== See also ==
- In Between (disambiguation)
- Between (disambiguation)
