= Between =

Between is a preposition. It may also refer to:

== Arts and entertainment ==
- Between (Frankmusik album), a 2013 album by Frankmusik
- "Between", a song by Jerry Cantrell from Boggy Depot
- Between (TV series), a Canadian science fiction-drama television and web series
- Between (三明治女孩的逆襲), a 2018 Taiwanese television series
- Between, a 2008 video game designed by Jason Rohrer
- The Between, a 1995 novel by Tananarive Due

== Other uses ==
- Between, Georgia, an American town

== See also ==
- In Between (disambiguation)
- Betweenness (disambiguation)
