= Lay Down Your Arms (The Graces song) =

1989 single by the Graces

Single by the Graces

from the album Perfect View
- B-side: "Out in the Fields"; "Should I Let You In"
- Released: 1989
- Genre: Pop rock
- Length: 4:14
- Label: A&M
- Songwriters: Charlotte Caffey; Ellen Shipley; Ralph Schuckett
- Producers: Ellen Shipley; Ralph Schuckett

The Graces singles chronology
| "Lay Down Your Arms" (1989) | "Perfect View" (1989) |

"Lay Down Your Arms" is a rock song which Charlotte Caffey, Ralph Schuckett, and Ellen Shipley wrote and composed, and which Shipley produced, for the Graces' album Perfect View (1989). Caffey was lead vocalist, and the song was released as the band's debut single. It charted at number 56 on the Billboard pop chart.

== Charts ==
Peak chart positions of "Shake It Off"
| Chart (1989) | Peak position |
|---|---|
| US Billboard Hot 100 | 56 |

== Belinda Carlisle cover ==
"Lay Down Your Arms"

Single by Belinda Carlisle

from the album Real
- Released: November 15, 1993
- Genre: Pop rock
- Length: 4:38
- Label: Virgin Records
- Songwriters: Charlotte Caffey; Ralph Schuckett; Ellen Shipley
- Producer: Ralph Schuckett

Belinda Carlisle singles chronology
| "Big Scary Animal" (1993) | "Lay Down Your Arms" (1993) | "In Too Deep" (1996) |

Music video
- "Lay Down Your Arms" on YouTube

The song was covered by the American singer-songwriter Belinda Carlisle, who, like her friend Caffey, was an alumna of the Go-Go's. It was the second song Carlisle released in November 1993 by Virgin Records from her fifth album, Real (1993). Carlisle's version, which Schuckett produced, was more successful, reaching number 27 on the UK Singles Chart. The CD single included three additional tracks: "Tell Me", "Wrap My Arms", and "Here Comes My Baby"; the last two were 8-track demos.

=== Critical reception ===
Upon its release as a single, Taylor Parkes of Melody Maker drew comparisons between "Lay Down Your Arms" and Carlisle's preceding single, commenting, "'Big Scary Animal' was a cracker, and this is twice as good again – stylishly dumb." Alan Jones from Music Week gave Carlisle's version of the song three out of five, writing, "This undistinguished single clatters along without providing any moments of great significance. A hit (all her Virgin singles are) but not one of Carlisle's biggest or best."

=== Track listing ===
- 4 track CD single
1. "Lay Down Your Arms"
2. "Tell Me"
3. "Wrap My Arms Around You" (8-track demo)
4. "Here Comes My Baby" (8-track demo)

=== Charts ===
| Chart (1993) | Peak position |
|---|---|
| Australia (ARIA) | 115 |
| Europe (Eurochart Hot 100) | 75 |
| UK Singles (Official Charts) | 27 |
| UK Airplay (Music Week) | 21 |
