= In Between =

In Between may refer to:

== Film and television ==
- In Between, a 1991 film featuring Alexandra Paul
- In Between (1994 film), a Hong Kong romantic anthology film
- In Between (2005 film), a film featuring Deborah Twiss
- Darmiyaan: In Between, a 1997 Indian film
- In Between (2016 film), a French-Israeli film by Maysaloun Hamoud
- In Between (miniseries), a 1987 Australian television miniseries
- In Between (半熟戀人), a 2012 Taiwanese drama
- The InBetween, a 2019 American supernatural drama television series
- The In-Between (2019 film), an American film by Mindy Bledsoe
- The In Between, a 2022 American film
- In Between (半熟男女), a 2024 Chinese drama starring Tian Xiwei and Xin Yunlai

== Music ==
=== Albums ===
- In Between (Jazzanova album), 2002
- In Between (Onry Ozzborn album) or the title song, 2005
- In Between (Paul van Dyk album) or the title song, 2007
- In Between, by Erik Truffaz, 2010
- In Between (The Feelies album), 2017
- Inbetween, by Bubbles, 2002
- The Inbetween, by Scarlet White, 2014
- The In Between (album), by Booker Ervin, or the title song, 1968
- The In-Between, by Jay Fung, 2014

=== EPs ===
- In Between (Dami Im EP), 2023
- In Between, by Rosie Thomas, 2001
- In Between (EP), by Lauren Jauregui, 2023

=== Songs ===
- "In Between" (Scotty McCreery song), 2019
- "In Between" (Beartooth song), 2016
- "In Between", by 6lack from Free 6lack, 2016
- "In Between", by Ayra Starr from 19 & Dangerous, 2021
- "In Between", by Beartooth from Disgusting, 2014
- "In Between", by Collective Soul from Disciplined Breakdown, 1997
- "In Between", by James Marriott from Are We There Yet?, 2023
- "In Between", by Judy Garland from the film Love Finds Andy Hardy, 1938.
- "In Between", by Julian Lennon from Everything Changes, 2013
- "In Between", by Kelsea Ballerini from Unapologetically, 2017
- "In Between", by Linkin Park from Minutes to Midnight, 2007
- "In Between", by Shawn Mendes from Shawn, 2024
- "The In-Between" (song), by Evanescence
- "The In-Between", by In This Moment from Mother, 2020

== Other uses ==
- In-between, another name for acey deucey, a card game

== See also ==
- Inbetweening, a process in animation
- Inbetweener (disambiguation)
- Between (disambiguation)
- Betweenness (disambiguation)
