= Runaway Horses (album) =

Studio album by Belinda Carlisle
- Released: October 3, 1989
- Studios: A&M, Sunset Sound, One on One, Lion's Share (Hollywood, California); Suma, Image (Los Angeles, California); Evergreen (Burbank, California); Miraval (Le Val, France)
- Genres: Pop rock; power pop
- Length: 47:57
- Labels: MCA; Virgin
- Producer: Rick Nowels

Belinda Carlisle chronology
| Heaven on Earth (1987) | Runaway Horses (1989) | Live Your Life Be Free (1991) |

Singles from Runaway Horses
- 1. "Leave a Light On" Released: September 1989; 2. "(We Want) the Same Thing" Released: October 1989; 3. "La Luna" Released: December 1989; 4. "Summer Rain" Released: January 1990; 5. "Runaway Horses" Released: February 1990; 6. "Vision of You" Released: May 1990

Runaway Horses is the third solo studio album by American singer Belinda Carlisle, released on October 3, 1989, by MCA Records in North America and Virgin Records globally. The album features songs written by Rick Nowels, Ellen Shipley, Charlotte Caffey and a song co-written by Carlisle herself. The album contains an array of guest artists, including George Harrison and Bryan Adams.

The album peaked at number 37 on the US Billboard 200, a considerable fall in sales from Carlisle's 1987 album, Heaven on Earth, but reached number four in the United Kingdom, where it was certified Platinum.

== Reception ==
Professional ratings
Review scores
| Source | Rating |
|---|---|
| AllMusic | 3/5 stars |
| Hi-Fi News & Record Review | A:3 |
| Los Angeles Times | 2.5/5 stars |
| Smash Hits | 7/10 |

In a positive review, Rob Garner of RPM called Runaway Horses "a very well packaged group effort" and said that "any one of these chorus-with-a-hook tracks could find play." Stephanie Brainerd of Cashbox, however, observed "nothing really ground-breaking here" and found it "difficult to hear any of the artistic growth or newfound maturity about which her biography boasts", continuing, "The album isn't bad; it is your basic radio-ready pop, and Carlisle will probably have more than one hit single from it. The song topics are pretty much all the same boy–girl relationship stuff, which is tolerable in small doses but nine songs about it?"

Retrospectively, AllMusic's Alex Henderson opined that Runaway Horses "isn't as strong as Heaven on Earth ... but is generally likeable and appealing. Although not most critics' cup of tea, the good-spirited, romantic idealism of 'Valentine,' 'Leave a Light On,' 'Whatever It Takes,' and other sugary pop/rock and power pop confections is tough to resist." "Now installed as one of the world's biggest female solo artists," wrote Steve Harnell of Classic Pop, "all eyes were on Belinda to follow up the success of Heaven on Earth. If the pressure to write another hit-packed album was intense, it only spurred Carlisle and her team on to even greater and more diverse work ... Runaway Horses is packed upfront with singles but the depth of material here makes this one of Carlisle's most rewarding albums."

== Commercial performance ==
The album made its debut on the Billboard 200 on October 21, 1989, and after seven weeks of slowly moving up the charts reached its peak position of number 37, a lower position than her previous two albums. The album spent a total of 25 weeks on the Billboard 200 and was certified gold by the RIAA. Runaway Horses was Carlisle's last album to chart in the United States.

The album debuted on the UK Albums Chart on November 4, 1989, at number four, which was the album's peak position, matching that of her previous album. The album moved down and back up the chart over the next 18 months and re-entered the top 10 in 1991. Five singles from the album entered the UK Top 40, two of which reached Top 10. The album spent a total of 39 weeks in the UK Top 100 and was certified Platinum by the BPI. Carlisle was presented with her Platinum disc live on the Saturday morning children's television show Going Live! on BBC1.

The album was also a success in Australia; it peaked at number six and was certified double Platinum becoming the 24th best-selling album of 1990.

Six singles were released from Runaway Horses and were successful in most markets, with the album giving Carlisle four more international top ten hits. "Leave a Light On" was the first song released from the album and became a top ten hit around the world including the UK, where it hit number four (and was certified Silver), Australia, where it hit number five, and Canada, where it hit number six. The song narrowly missed the top ten in the United States peaking at number 11. In Japan, "(We Want) The Same Thing" was released alongside "Leave a Light on" as the lead single in October 1989; when issued in the UK the following year, it became her fifth top ten single. "La Luna" was the third song released from the album and became a top 40 hit in Australia and the UK, also becoming her third top ten in Switzerland.

"Summer Rain" was the fourth song released and became a top ten hit in Australia and a top 30 hit in the US (where it was released as the second single) and the UK (where it was released as the sixth single in December 1990). "Runaway Horses" was the fifth single released but was not as successful as the previous singles, only managing to reach number 40 in the UK. "Vision of You" was the sixth song released and became the lowest-charting single on the album only peaking at number 41 in the UK, and a remix in 1991 reached 71.

== Reissues ==
Runaway Horses was re-released on August 26, 2013, in a 2CD+DVD casebook edition from Edsel Recording (EDSG 8026) featuring the original album remastered, the single versions, remixes and B-sides. The DVD features the videos from the album and an exclusive interview with Carlisle discussing the album.

Runaway Horses 30th Anniversary Edition was released in 2019 to coincide with her Runaway Horses 30th Anniversary Tour. This version features the 27 tracks from the 2013 re-release without the DVD, plus three new cover recordings: Gordon Lightfoot's "If You Could Read My Mind", Elton John's "I Need You to Turn To" and Joni Mitchell's "Both Sides Now". The digital download features all 30 tracks and the Deluxe Edition is a 4LP+CD Box Set.

== Track listing ==
All tracks are written by Rick Nowels and Ellen Shipley, except where noted.

| No. | Title | Writer(s) | Length |
|---|---|---|---|
| 1. | "Leave a Light On" | | 4:37 |
| 2. | "Runaway Horses" | | 4:42 |
| 3. | "Vision of You" | | 4:40 |
| 4. | "Summer Rain" | Robbie Seidman; Maria Vidal | 5:25 |
| 5. | "La Luna" | | 4:43 |
| 6. | "(We Want) The Same Thing" | | 3:59 |
| 7. | "Deep Deep Ocean" | Tom Kelly; Amy Sky; Billy Steinberg | 4:05 |
| 8. | "Valentine" | David Munday; Sandy Stewart | 5:03 |
| 9. | "Whatever It Takes" | | 4:47 |
| 10. | "Shades of Michaelangelo" | Charlotte Caffey; Belinda Carlisle | 5:52 |

== Personnel ==
- Belinda Carlisle – lead vocals
- Charles Judge – keyboards (1–7, 10), acoustic piano (2, 7, 9)
- Jimmie Haskell – accordion (5)
- Sandy Stewart – acoustic piano (8)
- David Munday – keyboards (8), guitars (8), bass (8), drum programming (8)
- Rick Nowels – guitars (1, 9), acoustic guitar (2, 10), electric guitar (2), Spanish guitar (3, 5), keyboards (5)
- Ben Schultz – guitars (1, 7), acoustic guitar (3), 12-string guitar (3)
- George Harrison – slide guitar solo (1), 12-string guitar (7), 6-string bass (7)
- X.Y. Jones – guitars (1, 4, 6–10), electric guitar (2)
- Steve Lukather – guitars (6)
- John Pierce – bass (1–4, 6, 7, 9)
- Eric Pressly – bass (10)
- Rudy Richman – drums (1, 3)
- Luis Conte – Native American drums (2), percussion (2, 10), bongos (3), shaker (3)
- Jorge Black – percussion (2), tom-tom (2), bass (5)
- Kenny Aronoff – drums (6, 7, 9)
- Paul Buckmaster – string arrangements and conductor (4)
- Sid Page – violin (5)
- Bekka Bramlett – backing vocals (1–9)
- Donna De Lory – backing vocals (1–5, 7–9)
- Ellen Shipley – backing vocals (1–3, 5, 7, 9)
- Maria Vidal – backing vocals (1–9)
- N'Dea Davenport – backing vocals (3)
- Carmen Twillie – backing vocals (6)
- Mona Lisa Young – backing vocals (6)
- Laura Harding – backing vocals (8)
- Bryan Adams – backing vocals (9)

== Production ==
- Rick Nowels – producer, arrangements
- Robert Feist – engineer
- David Leonard – engineer
- Steve MacMillan – engineer, mixing
- Steve Marcantonio – engineer
- Dave Meegan – engineer
- Lawrence Ethan – assistant engineer
- Lori Fumar – assistant engineer
- Scott Symington – assistant engineer
- Mike Tacci – assistant engineer
- Randy Wine – assistant engineer
- Marc DeSisto – mixing
- Shelly Yakus – mixing
- Stephen Marcussen – mastering at Precision Lacquer (Hollywood, CA)
- Laura Harding – production coordination
- Timothy McDaniel – production coordination
- Norman Moore – art direction, design
- Herb Ritts – photography
- Jeannine Braden – personal assistant

== Charts ==
=== Weekly charts ===
Weekly chart performance for Runaway Horses
| Chart (1989–1990) | Peak position |
|---|---|
| Australian Albums (ARIA) | 6 |
| Austrian Albums (Ö3 Austria) | 13 |
| Canada Top Albums/CDs (RPM) | 38 |
| Dutch Albums (Album Top 100) | 64 |
| European Albums (Music & Media) | 18 |
| Finnish Albums (Suomen virallinen lista) | 11 |
| German Albums (Offizielle Top 100) | 24 |
| Italian Albums (Musica e dischi) | 24 |
| Japanese Albums (Oricon) | 14 |
| New Zealand Albums (RMNZ) | 32 |
| Swedish Albums (Sverigetopplistan) | 4 |
| Swiss Albums (Schweizer Hitparade) | 12 |
| UK Albums (Official Charts) | 4 |
| US Billboard 200 | 37 |
| US Cash Box Top 100 Albums | 48 |

=== Year-end charts ===
1989 year-end chart performance for Runaway Horses
| Chart (1989) | Position |
|---|---|
| UK Albums (Gallup) | 57 |

1990 year-end chart performance for Runaway Horses
| Chart (1990) | Position |
|---|---|
| Australian Albums (ARIA) | 24 |
| European Albums (Music & Media) | 88 |
| German Albums (Offizielle Top 100) | 90 |
| Swiss Albums (Schweizer Hitparade) | 34 |

1991 year-end chart performance for Runaway Horses
| Chart (1991) | Position |
|---|---|
| UK Albums (Gallup) | 84 |

== Certifications ==
Certifications for Runaway Horses
| Region | Certification | Certified units/sales |
|---|---|---|
| Australia (ARIA) | 2× Platinum | 140,000^{^} |
| Canada (Music Canada) | Platinum | 100,000^{^} |
| Spain (Promusicae) | Gold | 50,000^{^} |
| Sweden (GLF) | Gold | 50,000^{^} |
| Switzerland (IFPI Switzerland) | Gold | 25,000^{^} |
| United Kingdom (BPI) | Platinum | 300,000^{^} |
| United States (RIAA) | Gold | 500,000^{^} |
^{^} Shipments figures based on certification alone.
