= Half the World (Belinda Carlisle song) =

1991 single by Belinda Carlisle

Single by Belinda Carlisle

from the album Live Your Life Be Free
- Released: December 1991
- Length: 4:23
- Label: Virgin, Offside
- Songwriters: Richard Feldman, Eric Pressly, Ellen Shipley
- Producer: Richard Feldman

Belinda Carlisle singles chronology
"Do You Feel Like I Feel?" (1991)	"Half the World" (1991)	"Little Black Book" (1992)

Music video
- "Belinda Carlisle - Half The World (Official HD Music Video)" on YouTube

"Half the World" is a song by the American singer Belinda Carlisle, released in December 1991 by Offside and Virgin Records, as the third single from her fourth album, Live Your Life Be Free (1991). The song was written by Richard Feldman, Eric Pressly and Ellen Shipley, and produced by Feldman. It features backing vocals from Sheryl Crow.

== Critical reception ==
Upon its release as single, Music & Media described the song as a "lushly orchestrated ballad". David Quantick of NME criticized it as "gourmet toss ordinaire" and "a weedy 'Time After Time' clone ballad". He was more favorable towards the version of "Live Your Life Be Free which appears as a B-side on the single, describing it as "a belting verse which suggests Carlisle could be the punk rock Suzi Quatro of the 21st century". In a retrospective review of Live Your Life Be Free, Justin Kantor of AllMusic noted the song's "elegant arrangement" and "timeless melody", the latter of which he considered "the kind that made earlier hits like "Heaven Is a Place on Earth" and "Circle in the Sand" mainstays on radio long after their chart runs."

== Track listings ==
- CD 1
1. "Half the World (radio edit)
2. "Only a Dream (previously unreleased) (Charlotte Caffey, Belinda Carlisle, and Richard Feldman)
3. "Live Your Life Be Free (Original intro version)
- CD 2
1. "Half the World (album version)
2. "Vision of You (Remix 91 version)
3. "Circle In the Sand (album version)
4. "Love Never Dies (album version)

== Charts ==
Chart (1991–1992)	Peak position
Australia (ARIA)	129
Europe (Eurochart Hot 100)	93
Germany (GfK)	62
UK Singles (OCC)	35
UK Airplay (Music Week)	26
