= Do You Feel Like I Feel? =

1991 single by Belinda Carlisle

Single by Belinda Carlisle

from the album Live Your Life Be Free
- B-side: "World of Love"
- Released: November 4, 1991
- Length: 5:09
- Label: MCA (US); Virgin (international)
- Songwriters: Rick Nowels, Ellen Shipley
- Producer: Rick Nowels

Belinda Carlisle singles chronology
"Live Your Life Be Free" (1991)	"Do You Feel Like I Feel?" (1991)	"Half the World" (1991)

"Do You Feel Like I Feel?" is a song by American singer Belinda Carlisle, released as the second single from her fourth studio album, Live Your Life Be Free (1991). It became Carlisle's last single to chart on the US Billboard Hot 100, peaking at number 73.

== Music video ==
The music video was inspired by the cult film Attack of the 50 Foot Woman, and was directed by Nick Egan.

== Track listings ==
7-inch, cassette, and mini-CD single

1. "Do You Feel Like I Feel?"
2. "World of Love"

CD single; Australian cassette single

1. "Do You Feel Like I Feel?"
2. "World of Love"
3. "Do You Feel Like I Feel?" (dance mix)
4. "Live Your Life Be Free" (dance instrumental mix)

== Charts ==
Chart (1991–1992)	Peak position
Australia (ARIA)	42
Canada Top Singles (RPM)	75
Europe (Eurochart Hot 100)	86
European Airplay (European Hit Radio)	20
Luxembourg (Radio Luxembourg)	8
UK Singles (Official Charts)	29
UK Airplay (Music Week)	5
US Billboard Hot 100	73
US Cash Box Top 100 Singles	60

== Release history ==
Region	Date	Format(s)	Label(s)	Ref.
United Kingdom	November 4, 1991	7-inch vinyl; CD; cassette	Virgin; Offside	
United Kingdom	November 11, 1991	7-inch picture disc	Virgin; Offside	
Australia	January 20, 1992	7-inch vinyl; CD; cassette	Virgin	
Japan	January 21, 1992	Mini-CD	Virgin	
