= The Graces (band) =

American rock band

- Origin: Los Angeles, California, U.S.
- Genre: Pop rock
- Years active: 1987–1992
- Label: A&M Records
- Past members: Charlotte Caffey; Meredith Brooks; Gia Ciambotti; Chrissy Shefts

The Graces were an American pop rock band in the late 1980s and early 1990s featuring Charlotte Caffey, Meredith Brooks, and Gia Ciambotti.

== History ==
Formed in 1987, they released their debut album Perfect View on A&M Records in 1989. Their first single "Lay Down Your Arms" hit No. 56 on the Billboard Hot 100 but the album and subsequent singles flopped.

In 1991, they were dropped by the record label and Brooks left the band. She was replaced by Chrissy Shefts and the group continued to play live. They were about to be re-signed when Ciambotti was offered a job with Bruce Springsteen's 1992 solo backing band, so the group disbanded in 1992 without recording a second album. Belinda Carlisle later covered "Lay Down Your Arms" on her 1993 album Real.

== Discography ==
=== Albums ===
- Perfect View (1989) US No. 147

=== Singles ===
- "Lay Down Your Arms" (1989) US No. 56
- "Perfect View" (1989)
- "Time Waits for No One" (1989)
- "50,000 Candles Burning" (1989)
