= Leave a Light On (Belinda Carlisle song) =

1989 single by Belinda Carlisle

Single by Belinda Carlisle

from the album Runaway Horses
- B-side: "Shades of Michaelangelo"
- Released: September 25, 1989
- Genre: Pop; guitar pop; pop rock
- Length: 4:15
- Label: MCA; Virgin
- Songwriters: Rick Nowels; Ellen Shipley
- Producer: Rick Nowels

Belinda Carlisle singles chronology
"Love Never Dies" (1988)	"Leave a Light On" (1989)	"(We Want) The Same Thing" (1989)

Music video
- "Leave a Light On" on YouTube

"Leave a Light On" is a song by American singer Belinda Carlisle, recorded for her third studio album Runaway Horses (1989). Penned by Rick Nowels and Ellen Shipley and produced by the former, it was released as the album's lead single on September 25, 1989, via MCA Records in North America and Virgin Records internationally. In Japan, "(We Want) The Same Thing" was released simultaneously with "Leave a Light On" as the album's lead single in October. The track features a notable slide guitar solo from George Harrison of the Beatles.

"Leave a Light On" proved to be a major success for Carlisle more internationally than in America. It reached top five status in countries like Australia, Austria, Ireland, and the United Kingdom, but barely missed the top ten in the United States, peaking at number 11 on the Billboard Hot 100 and number 12 on the Cash Box Top 100 Singles charts. A music video was made for the song, directed by Peter Care, which saw Carlisle singing in the desert and in Las Vegas, Nevada. The track has been certified Silver by the British Phonographic Industry (BPI) for shipments of 200,000 copies.

== Release and commercial reception ==
Released at the end of 1989 on CD, 7-inch vinyl, and 12-inch vinyl, "Leave a Light On" became a top-ten hit in Australia, Austria, Canada, the Netherlands, Italy, Sweden, Switzerland, and the United Kingdom. In the United States "Leave a Light On" peaked at number 11, affording Carlisle her final US top-twenty hit.

== Composition and recording ==
"Leave a Light On" is performed in the keys of C major (verse) and D major (chorus) with a tempo of 129 BPM. The track features George Harrison of the Beatles on slide guitar; Carlisle recalls: "Rick [Nowels] said we should get someone cool and with a distinctive style to play the lead guitar part. I thought for a moment and said 'What about George Harrison?' I had met George briefly a few years earlier in San Remo Italy and Morgan [Mason, Carlisle's husband] through his work on Sex Lies and Videotape" - a film Mason had produced for Harrison's HandMade Films - "knew someone who was close to [Harrison] and able to get word to him. George responded right away, saying he'd love to help out." In a 1991 joint television interview with Harrison and Eric Clapton, Harrison recounted playing on the song, but couldn't remember Carlisle's name, referring to her as "...whatshername, the one with the red hair."

There are four versions of the song. The album version and the 7-inch edit were mixed by Shelly Yakus and Steve McMillan. The other two, mixed by Jason Corsaro, are the Extended Mix and an edit of this titled the Kamikazee Mix; the latter is included on Carlisle's "Vision of You" CD single.

== Critical reception ==
David Giles from Music Week named "Leave a Light On" a Single of the Week, writing, "No great departure from the formula pop of her earlier singles, with glossy production undercut by a rock edge as though to indicate some serious intent beneath the glossy surface." Richard Lowe from Smash Hits said, "Magnificent. I'm a sucker for thoroughly predictable American rock records with whistleable tunes, chugging guitars, big blustering choruses and words about nothing in particular except for general lovey-doveyness. And so are lots of people, which is why this'll be a giant hit. Quite right too." Dave Sholin of the Gavin Report called the track "pop perfection". Pan-European magazine Music & Media described it as "transatlantic guitar pop with a strong chorus" and that it was "definitely a hit."

== Music video ==
The accompanying music video for "Leave a Light On" was directed by Peter Care.

In the music video, Carlisle is seen driving through the desert, filling up her car tank at a nearby gas station, singing the song in different outfits, backgrounds and locations, and walking down the metropolitan streets of Las Vegas where she poses for pictures and laughs while sharing moments of levity with tourists.

== Track listings ==
- 7-inch, cassette, and Japanese mini-CD single
1. "Leave a Light On" – 4:15
2. "Shades of Michaelangelo" – 5:52
- 12-inch single

A1. "Leave a Light On" (extended mix)
B1. "Leave a Light On" (7-inch version)
B2. "Shades of Michaelangelo"

- CD and European mini-CD single
1. "Leave a Light On" (7-inch version)
2. "Shades of Michaelangelo"
3. "Leave a Light On" (extended mix)

== Personnel ==
- Produced by Rick Nowels
- Vocals by Belinda Carlisle
- Slide guitar solo by George Harrison
- Guitar by Rick Nowels and X.Y. Jones
- Keyboards by Charles Judge
- 12-string guitar by Ben Schultz
- Bass guitar by John Pierce
- Drums by Rudy Richman
- Backing vocals by Ellen Shipley, Maria Vidal, Donna De Lory and Bekka Bramlett

== Charts ==
=== Weekly charts ===
1989–1990 weekly chart performance for "Leave a Light On"
Chart (1989–1990)	Peak position
Australia (ARIA)	5
Austria (Ö3 Austria Top 40)	4
Belgium (Ultratop 50 Flanders)	9
Canada Top Singles (RPM)	8
Denmark (Hitlisten)	7
Europe (Eurochart Hot 100 Singles)	13
European Airplay (Music & Media)	6
Finland (Suomen virallinen lista)	13
Iceland (Dagblaðið Vísir)	7
Ireland (IRMA)	4
Israel (Israeli Singles Chart)	15
Italy (Musica e dischi)	20
Luxembourg (Radio Luxembourg)	3
Quebec (ADISQ)	17
Netherlands (Dutch Top 40)	11
Netherlands (Single Top 100)	7
New Zealand (Recorded Music NZ)	22
Sweden (Sverigetopplistan)	8
Switzerland (Schweizer Hitparade)	8
UK Singles (Official Charts)	4
US Billboard Hot 100	11
US Adult Contemporary (Billboard)	8
US Cash Box Top 100	12
US Adult Contemporary (Gavin Report)	15
US Top 40 (Gavin Report)	10
US Adult Contemporary (Radio & Records)	7
US Contemporary Hit Radio (Radio & Records)	11
West Germany (GfK)	15

2022 weekly chart performance for "Leave a Light On"
Chart (2022)	Peak position
Poland Airplay (ZPAV)	93

=== Year-end charts ===
1989 year-end chart performance for "Leave a Light On"
Chart (1989)	Position
European Airplay (Music & Media)	48
Netherlands (Single Top 100)	96
UK Singles (Gallup)	50

1990 year-end chart performance for "Leave a Light On"
Chart (1990)	Position
Australia (ARIA)	51
Germany (Media Control)	89

== Certifications ==
Certifications for "Leave a Light On"
Region	Certification	Certified units/sales
Australia (ARIA)	Platinum	70,000^{^}
Sweden (GLF)	Gold	25,000^{^}
United Kingdom (BPI)	Silver	200,000^{^}
^{^} Shipments figures based on certification alone.

== Cover versions ==
- In 2013, retro synthpop producer/remixer Yisraelee produced a cover version of the track.
- In 2016, South African four-piece band 4Werke (4Warm) released a cover version on their self-titled album.
- In 2024, Swiss rockers Black Diamonds released a cover version on their 2024 album Destination Paradise which entered the official Swiss album charts on position #3. Guest singer on this version is powerhouse singer David Balfour from the Belfast based Hard Rock band Maverick.

== In popular culture ==
- The single can be heard in a 1991 episode of the TV sitcom Out of This World entitled "I Want My Evie TV".
