= Little Black Book (song) =

1992 single by Belinda Carlisle

Single by Belinda Carlisle

from the album Live Your Life Be Free
- B-side: "Only a Dream"; "The Air You Breathe"
- Released: August 17, 1992
- Length: 4:14
- Label: Virgin; Offside
- Songwriters: Richard Feldman; Marcy Detroit; Belinda Carlisle
- Producer: Rick Nowels

Belinda Carlisle singles chronology
"Half the World" (1992)	"Little Black Book" (1992)	"Big Scary Animal" (1993)

Music video
- "Little Black Book" on YouTube

"Little Black Book" is the fifth and final single from American singer-songwriter Belinda Carlisle's fourth studio album, Live Your Life Be Free (1991). Released on August 17, 1992 by Virgin and Offside, it was Carlisle's first single containing a co-writing credit from her with Richard Feldman and Marcy Detroit. American singer-songwriter Sheryl Crow performs the background vocals under the name "Cherryl Crowe". One of the single's B-side, "The Air You Breathe", was originally performed by Stéphanie in 1991 under the title "You Don't Die from Love". The accompanying music video was directed by Scott Kalvert.

== Track listings ==
- UK 7-inch single

A. "Little Black Book"
B. "Only a Dream"

- UK CD1 and Australian CD single
1. "Little Black Book"
2. "Only a Dream"
3. "The Air You Breathe"
- UK CD2
1. "Little Black Book" (Little Black mix)
2. "Little Black Book" (Belinda's in the House mix)
3. "Little Black Book"
4. "The Air You Breathe"
- UK cassette single

A. "Little Black Book"
B. "The Air You Breathe"

== Charts ==
Chart (1992)	Peak position
Australia (ARIA)	106
Europe (Eurochart Hot 100)	72
Germany (GfK)	69
UK Singles (Official Charts)	28
UK Airplay (Music Week)	19

== Release history ==
Region	Date	Format(s)	Label(s)	Ref.
United Kingdom	August 17, 1992	7-inch vinyl; CD1; cassette	Virgin; Offside	
United Kingdom	August 24, 1992	CD2	Virgin; Offside	
Australia	August 31, 1992	CD; cassette	Virgin	
