= La Luna (song) =

1989 single by Belinda Carlisle

Single by Belinda Carlisle

from the album Runaway Horses
- Released: November 27, 1989
- Genre: Flamenco
- Length: 4:43
- Label: MCA
- Songwriters: Rick Nowels, Ellen Shipley
- Producer: Rick Nowels

Belinda Carlisle singles chronology
"(We Want) The Same Thing" (1989)	"La Luna" (1989)	"Summer Rain" (1990)

"La Luna" (English: "The Moon") is a song by American singer Belinda Carlisle, released in 1989 as the second single (third in Japan) from her third album, Runaway Horses (1989).

== Background ==
"La Luna" was written by Rick Nowels and Ellen Shipley and produced by the former. It was included on Belinda Carlisle's third studio album Runaway Horses (1989). The song is a flamenco song.

== Music video ==
The accompanying music video for "La Luna" was directed by Andy Morahan. It features Carlisle lying naked in bed fantasizing about a night à la Cinderella.

== Charts ==
=== Weekly charts ===
Chart (1989–1990)	Peak position
Australia (ARIA)	21
Austria (Ö3 Austria Top 40)	29
Belgium (Ultratop 50 Flanders)	23
Europe (Eurochart Hot 100)	64
European Airplay (Music & Media)	17
Finland (Suomen virallinen lista)	8
Italy Airplay (Music & Media)	8
Netherlands (Single Top 100)	70
Switzerland (Schweizer Hitparade)	10
UK Singles (Official Charts)	38
West Germany (GfK)	16

=== Year-end charts ===
Chart (1990)	Position
Germany (Media Control)	82

== Release history ==
Region	Date	Format(s)	Label(s)	Ref.
United Kingdom	November 27, 1989	7-inch vinyl; 12-inch vinyl; CD; cassette	MCA	
Japan	January 21, 1990	Mini-CD	MCA	
