= (We Want) The Same Thing =

1989 single by Belinda Carlisle

"(We Want) the Same Thing"

Single by Belinda Carlisle

from the album Runaway Horses
- B-side: "Shades of Michaelangelo"
- Released: October 21, 1989
- Genre: Pop; arena rock
- Length: 3:59; 4:17 (Summer remix)
- Label: MCA; Virgin
- Songwriters: Rick Nowels; Ellen Shipley
- Producer: Rick Nowels

Belinda Carlisle singles chronology
"Leave a Light On" (1989)	"(We Want) the Same Thing" (1989)	"La Luna" (1989)

Music video
- "(We Want) The Same Thing" on YouTube

"(We Want) The Same Thing" is a song by American singer Belinda Carlisle. Written by Rick Nowels and Ellen Shipley, it was produced by Nowels for Carlisle's third album, Runaway Horses (1989). In Japan, it was released simultaneously with "Leave a Light On" as the album's lead single on October 21, 1989, while in the United Kingdom, it was issued as the album's fifth single in October 1990. To help promote the single in the UK, Virgin Records released a deluxe 12-inch vinyl box set with free stickers and a picture disc single on CD, in addition to standard formats. The single peaked at number six on the UK Singles Chart and spent 10 weeks in the top 75.

== Single remix ==
The single version of "(We Want) The Same Thing" is different from the original version found on Runaway Horses. The intro of the single version includes chants of 'Hey!' repeated four times before a drum piece introduces the song. In the Runaway Horses album booklet, the lyrics listed for "(We Want) The Same Thing" vary from the actual version on the album but match the lyrics for the single version.

== Track listings ==
- US cassette single
1. "(We Want) The Same Thing"
- UK picture disc CD single
1. "(We Want) The Same Thing" (Summer remix)
2. "Circle in the Sand" (Sandblast multi-mix)
3. "Shades of Michaelangelo"
- UK 12-inch single
1. "(We Want) The Same Thing" (extended Summer remix)
2. "Circle in the Sand" (Sandblast multi-mix)
- UK and Australian 7-inch and cassette single
1. "(We Want) The Same Thing" (Summer remix)
2. "Shades of Michaelangelo"
- Japanese CD single
1. "(We Want) The Same Thing"
2. "Shades of Michaelangelo"
3. "(We Want) The Same Thing" (Summer remix)
4. "Shades of Michaelangelo"
5. "Circle in the Sand" (Sandblast multi-mix)
- Japanese mini-CD single
1. "The Same Thing"
2. "Leave a Light On" (extended mix)

== Charts ==
Chart (1990)	Peak position
Australia (ARIA)	103
Europe (Eurochart Hot 100)	25
European Airplay (Music & Media)	22
Germany (GfK)	53
Iceland (Íslenski Listinn Topp 10)	10
Ireland (IRMA)	22
Israel (Israeli Singles Chart)	3
Luxembourg (Radio Luxembourg)	5
UK Singles (Official Charts)	6
UK Airplay (Music Week)	12

== Release history ==
Region	Date	Format(s)	Label(s)	Ref(s).
Japan	October 21, 1989	Mini-CD	Virgin Japan	
United Kingdom	October 1, 1990	7-inch vinyl; 12-inch vinyl; CD; cassette	Virgin	
Australia	October 8, 1990	7-inch vinyl; 12-inch vinyl; cassette	Virgin	
United Kingdom	October 15, 1990	12-inch vinyl box set	Virgin	
Japan	November 21, 1990	CD	Virgin Japan	
