= Live Your Life Be Free (song) =

1991 single by Belinda Carlisle

Single by Belinda Carlisle

from the album Live Your Life Be Free
- B-side: "Loneliness Game"
- Released: September 16, 1991
- Length: 5:14 (album version); 4:23 (single edit)
- Label: Virgin; Offside
- Songwriters: Rick Nowels; Ellen Shipley
- Producer: Rick Nowels

Belinda Carlisle singles chronology
| "(We Want) The Same Thing" (1990) | "Live Your Life Be Free" (1991) | "Do You Feel Like I Feel?" (1991) |

"Live Your Life Be Free" is a song written by Rick Nowels and Ellen Shipley, and produced by Nowels for American singer Belinda Carlisle's fourth album, Live Your Life Be Free (1991). Released on September 16, 1991, by Virgin and Offside, the single reached the top 20 in Australia, Sweden, and the United Kingdom. The song's music video was directed by Nick Egan.

== Track listings ==
- 7-inch, cassette, and mini-CD single
1. "Live Your Life Be Free"
2. "Loneliness Game"
- 12-inch single

A1. "Live Your Life Be Free" (club mix) – 5:30
B1. "Live Your Life Be Free" – 4:20
B2. "Loneliness Game" – 4:31

- CD single
1. "Live Your Life Be Free"
2. "Loneliness Game"
3. "Live Your Life Be Free" (club mix)

== Charts ==
=== Weekly charts ===
| Chart (1991) | Peak position |
|---|---|
| Australia (ARIA) | 13 |
| Europe (Eurochart Hot 100) | 29 |
| Europe Airplay (European Hit Radio) | 8 |
| Finland (Suomen virallinen lista) | 25 |
| Germany (GfK) | 71 |
| Ireland (IRMA) | 21 |
| Israel (Israeli Singles Chart) | 2 |
| Luxembourg (Radio Luxembourg) | 6 |
| Netherlands (Single Top 100) | 45 |
| New Zealand (Recorded Music NZ) | 22 |
| Sweden (Sverigetopplistan) | 16 |
| UK Singles (Official Charts) | 12 |
| UK Airplay (Music Week) | 2 |

=== Year-end charts ===
| Chart (1991) | Position |
|---|---|
| Australia (ARIA) | 70 |
| Europe (European Hit Radio) | 58 |
| Sweden (Topplistan) | 96 |

== Release history ==
| Region | Date | Format(s) | Label(s) | Ref. |
|---|---|---|---|---|
| United Kingdom | September 16, 1991 | 7-inch vinyl; 12-inch vinyl; CD; cassette | Virgin; Offside | |
| Australia | September 30, 1991 | CD; cassette | Virgin; Offside | |
| Japan | October 9, 1991 | Mini-CD | Virgin; Offside | |
| Australia | October 21, 1991 | 12-inch vinyl | Virgin; Offside | |
