= Isle of Dogs (soundtrack) =

Isle of Dogs (Original Soundtrack)
- Album cover

Soundtrack album by Alexandre Desplat
- Released: March 23, 2018
- Recorded: 2017–2018
- Studios: Air Studios, London
- Genre: Film soundtrack
- Length: 43:29
- Label: ABKCO
- Producers: Wes Anderson; Randall Poster

Alexandre Desplat chronology
The Shape of Water (2017)	Isle of Dogs (2018)	Operation Finale (2019)

Isle of Dogs (Original Soundtrack) is the soundtrack to the 2018 film Isle of Dogs directed by Wes Anderson. The album features an original score composed by Alexandre Desplat and musical contributions from Japanese artists. The album was released through ABKCO Records on March 23, 2018. Desplat was nominated for an Academy Awards, British Academy Film Awards, Golden Globe Awards, World Soundtrack Award for Soundtrack Composer of the Year and Critics' Choice Movie Awards under the Best Original Score category.

== Development ==
In July 2017, it was announced that Alexandre Desplat would score music for Isle of Dogs, renewing his association with Anderson since Fantastic Mr. Fox (2009). He was brought onboard when the film's production was almost completed. Desplat's likeness towards Japanese culture was reflected on the musical sensibilities and the specific soundscape he found for the film. He used the taiko drums, owing to Anderson's suggestion as it played the melody of the boy, which was "the Japanese seed and color" that Desplat had found. The instruments ranged from various sizes and shapes and had a huge dynamic range in its sound. This eventually varied in creating the ambience and mood of the film, where the drumming of the taiko drums evoke tension and fear.

Besides the taiko drums, Desplat further used saxophones, bass, French horns along with a group of recorders, and male choir, that provided a "very strange mix of an occidental feel with sometimes jazzy elements". The use of American instruments could "really bounce off of the relentless Taiko drumming, and certainly have the syncopation motifs, completely away from any Japanese reference". The chorus was another element of the band, but Desplat refrained from using high register, tenor vocals and female choir, to provide a monk-like chant. Since Yoko Ono plays a character in the film, Desplat suggested the use of the syllables "Yoko, Ono" to provide homage to Japanese culture.

To experiment with the film's music, Wes suggested nearly 30 saxophones, with Desplat reduced it to 4–8 in number, to provide a motif of a barking dog. At times, the recorders also play dissonant motifs with the taikos in the low register, which sounded like the bark. This was made to organically integrate the score with the film and provides authenticity to the Japanese influence. The piano played low notes instead of utilizing it as a tune or a chord, as he wanted it provide it as an element of movement in sync with the Taiko drums which provide a relentless rhythm.

Randall Poster selected several songs from Japanese artists which are used in the film. Most of the compositions are originated in Japanese classic films such as the Akira Kurosawa-directed Drunken Angel (1948) and Seven Samurai (1954).

== Reception ==
Writing for Backseat Mafia, Jon Bryan gave 7.5 out of 10 and summarized it as "a soundtrack which eludes to peril and danger without trying to hit you in the face with it, and as such it has an unescapable ‘Wes Anderson’ feel about it, which given the film it is soundtracking, means it is job done for Alexandre Desplat." Joe Goggins, in his review for Drowned in Sound, assigned 7 out of 10 and wrote "Desplat’s music—under the watchful eye of, and with telling contributions from, Anderson himself—captures both the light and dark of the piece in assured, if not unforgettable, fashion." Calum Marsh of Pitchfork assigned 7.3 out of 10 and wrote "Isle of Dogs is a film and a soundtrack of grand gestures and tiny fluctuations, of sadness and hope. It affects the mournful quality of Japanese theatre, then zips into the mid-century L.A. exuberance of giddy brass and woodwinds and drums. What’s most evident throughout is the warmth and thoughtfulness behind it all."

Kaya Savas of Film.Music.Media wrote "The score in the end works as a great editing and pacing device for the film, with some clever uses of switching from non-diegetic to diegetic. But in the end you wish there was more of the characters' personal quirks rather than the general overarching quirkiness of the score as a whole." Justin Chang of Los Angeles Times described it as "ever-surprising". Jonathan Romney of The Guardian wrote "Alexandre Desplat’s minimalist score is also a pleasure, mixing taiko drumming, laconic jazz bass and the occasional dash of Prokofiev." Guy Lodge of Variety described it as a "wonderfully sparse, louring score, which sounds like precisely nothing else the melodically inclined Frenchman has ever composed before [...] the soundtrack blends a steady tremble of Taiko drumming with, of all things, the occasional interpolation of Prokofiev's 'Troika'." David Edelstein of Vulture described it as a "lovely, strumming score".

== Track listing ==
No.	Title	Length
1.	"Shinto Shrine"	1:56
2.	"Taiko Drumming" (written and performed by Kaoru Watanabe)	0:50
3.	"The Municipal Dome"	2:29
4.	"Six Months Later + Dog Fight"	2:05
5.	"The Hero Pack"	1:08
6.	"First Crash-Landing"	0:56
7.	"Kanbei & Katsushiro – Kikuchiyo's Mambo" (from Seven Samurai) (written by Fumio Hayasaka, performed by Toho Symphony Orchestra)	0:52
8.	"Second Crash-Landing + Bath House + Beach Attack"	4:07
9.	"Nutmeg"	0:48
10.	"Kosame No Oka" (from Drunken Angel) (written by Hachirō Satō and Ryōichi Hattori, performed by David Mansfield)	1:06
11.	"I Won't Hurt You" (written by Michael Lloyd, Shaun Harris and Bob Markley, performed by The West Coast Pop Art Experimental Band)	2:23
12.	"Toshiro"	1:07
13.	"Jupiter and Oracle + Aboriginal Dogs"	2:05
14.	"Sushi Scene"	1:41
15.	"Midnight Sleighride" (from Lieutenant Kijé Suite) (written by Sergei Prokofiev, performed by Sauter-Finegan Orchestra)	3:01
16.	"Pagoda Slide"	1:08
17.	"First Bath of a Stray Dog"	0:26
18.	"TV Drumming" (written and performed by Watanabe)	0:31
19.	"Kobayashi Canine-Testing Laboratory"	1:57
20.	"Tokyo Shoe Shine Boy" (written by Seiichi Ida and Tasuku Sano, performed by Teruko Akatsuki)	3:02
21.	"Re-Election Night, Parts 1–3"	5:00
22.	"End Titles"	4:51
Total length:		43:29

== Accolades ==
Award	Date of ceremony	Category	Recipient(s)	Result	Ref.
Academy Awards	February 24, 2019	Best Original Score	Alexandre Desplat	Nominated	
British Academy Film Awards	February 10, 2019	Best Original Score	Alexandre Desplat	Nominated	
Critics' Choice Movie Awards	January 11, 2019	Best Score	Alexandre Desplat	Nominated	
Dallas–Fort Worth Film Critics Association	December 17, 2018	Best Musical Score	Alexandre Desplat	Won	
Georgia Film Critics Association	January 12, 2019	Best Original Score	Alexandre Desplat	Nominated	
Golden Globe Awards	January 6, 2019	Best Original Score	Alexandre Desplat	Nominated	
Hollywood Music in Media Awards	November 14, 2018	Original Score – Animated Film	Alexandre Desplat	Won	
Houston Film Critics Society	January 3, 2019	Best Original Score	Alexandre Desplat	Nominated	
International Film Music Critics Association	February 7, 2019	Best Original Score for an Animated Film	Alexandre Desplat	Won	
Online Film Critics Society	January 2, 2019	Best Score	Alexandre Desplat	Nominated	
San Francisco Bay Area Film Critics Circle	December 9, 2018	Best Original Score	Alexandre Desplat	Nominated	
World Soundtrack Awards	October 17, 2018	Soundtrack Composer of the Year	Alexandre Desplat (Note: Also for his work in Endangered Species, Suburbicon, The Shape of Water, and Valerian and the City of a Thousand Planets.)	Nominated	
