= Volume 3: A Child's Guide to Good and Evil =

Studio album by The West Coast Pop Art Experimental Band
- Released: May 1968
- Recorded: 1968
- Genres: Psychedelic rock, experimental rock
- Length: 32:09 (Original); 38:20 (2001 Reissue)
- Label: Reprise
- Producers: Jimmy Bowen, Bob Markley

The West Coast Pop Art Experimental Band chronology
Vol. 2 (Breaking Through) (1967)	Volume 3: A Child's Guide to Good and Evil (1968)	Where's My Daddy? (1969)

Professional ratings
Review scores
Source	Rating
AllMusic	1.5/5 stars

Volume 3: A Child's Guide to Good and Evil is the fourth album by the American psychedelic rock band The West Coast Pop Art Experimental Band (WCPAEB), and was released on Reprise Records in May 1968. By the time the group commenced recording Volume 3, guitarist Danny Harris had excused himself from the WCPAEB, reducing their numbers to a trio. As with the WCPAEB's earlier work, the album saw the band continue to blend psychedelic influences and complex studio techniques, and was marked by a bizarre fusion of innocence and malice in the band's lyrics. Volume 3 featured the WCPAEB's most ambitious music to date, and the striking cover art of John Van Hamersveld, yet it failed to sell in sufficient copies to chart nationally.

== Background ==
The WCPAEB had toured extensively on the Los Angeles live circuit during the first two years of their existence, but by 1968 the band stopped performing to become a studio band and focus exclusively on record production. In terms of record sales, the WCPAEB had fallen short of success on their major label albums Part One and Vol. 2 (Breaking Through) released by Reprise Records. After Danny Harris succumbed to what his brother bassist Shaun Harris described as a "sort of manic depressive illness", the group was effectively dropped to the trio of Bob Markley, Shaun Harris, and Ron Morgan, with session musician Jim Gordon on drums.

Recording sessions for Volume 3 commenced in early 1968, with Markley and Jimmy Bowen producing and Joe Sidore serving as the audio engineer. Morgan was instrumental in creating the psychedelic sound effects that adorned much of the album's tracks. In an interview, Morgan's younger brother Robert recalled how Morgan provided his contributions to the album: "Ron could really put on his guitar antics! He would use some very unusual effects. He had a Magnatone which Sears Roebuck made for accordions and it had a wild organ-type of sound. He would also use a Lesley speaker and a lot of Vox equipment - amps and 12-strings - because the group were sponsored by them for a while".

Among the songs that were recorded for Volume 3, the Markley-Morgan penned composition "Eighteen Is Over the Hill" according to music historian Richie Unterberger was one of the album's most pleasing moments with "some exquisite pop harmonies". Another song written by the two, "As the World Rises and Falls", features a guitar line reminiscent of "Smell of Incense" from the previous album, and some of Markley's most poetic phrasing. The album's title-track made effective use of wordless harmony vocals and the oddly striking and macabre imagery monologues by Markley. Both "Ritual #1" and "As Kind as Summer" make ample use of sound manipulation techniques, the latter of which features a reel-to-reel tape manually rocked back and forth, (as one of the earliest examples of "scratching" found on a recording) over the word "evil", backwards and forwards, gradually slowed down to nothing. In addition, "As Kind as Summer", along with the "live" song "Watch Yourself", were credited to Robert Bryant and Robert Yeazel respectively, both musicians who performed live with the WCPAEB.

Volume 3 was released in May 1968 and despite being less focused than Volume 2, it nonetheless successfully expanded on the musical approach of its predecessor. The album's front cover features the artwork of graphic designer John Van Hamersveld, adding an abstract image which contrasted light and darkness. Although the album failed to chart at the time, the work's reputation has grown over the years. Sean Lennon, writing for Rolling Stone magazine, placed Volume 3 in his list of lost psychedelic albums classics, and has described it as "really out there. They almost make Frank Zappa seem mainstream". A review on the Rising Storm website commented that the album is "a surreal set of beautiful folk-rock and off-the-wall psychedelic excursions from the mind of notorious west-coast playboy Bob Markley". Richie Unterberger was less than complimentary in his review, describing the album as contrived and "average or even unmemorable, easy-going late-1960s L.A. rock".

By the 1990s, a revival of interest in the WCPAEB had begun, which resulted in Sundazed Music reissuing Volume 3 and their previous three albums in 2001. The Sundazed reissue features two bonus tracks, the mono versions of "Shifting Sands" and "1906", both taken from their second album Part One. European reinstallments of Volume 3 omit "Anniversary of World War III", which is just total silence.

== Track listing ==
1. "Eighteen Is Over the Hill" (Bob Markley, Ron Morgan) - 2:42
2. "In the Country" (Markley, Shaun Harris) - 2:03
3. "Ritual #1" (Markley, Harris, John Ware) 2:09
4. "Our Drummer Always Plays in the Nude" (Markley, Harris) - 2:45
5. "As the World Rises and Falls" (Markley, Morgan) - 4:52
6. "Until the Poorest People Have Money to Spend" (Markley, Harris) - 2:18
7. "Watch Yourself" (R.Yaezel) - 5:20
8. "A Child's Guide to Good and Evil" (Markley, Harris) - 2:29
9. "Ritual #2" (Markley, Harris) - 2:04
10. "A Child of a Few Hours Is Burning to Death" (Markley, Morgan) - 2:41
11. "As Kind as Summer" (Markley, Harris, Roger Bryant) - 1:10
12. "Anniversary of World War III" (Markley) - 1:36

2001 CD bonus tracks

13. "Shifting Sands (Single mix)" (Baker Knight) - 3:54
14. "1906 (Single mix)" (Markley, Morgan) - 2:17

== Personnel ==
- Bob Markley - backing vocals, spoken word, tambourine, percussion
- Shaun Harris - lead vocals, bass guitar
- Ron Morgan - backing vocals, lead guitar, sitar
