= The West Coast Pop Art Experimental Band Companion =

Compilation album by The West Coast Pop Art Experimental Band
- Released: June 7, 2011
- Recorded: 1960–1971
- Genre: Psychedelic rock; psychedelic pop; folk rock; rock
- Length: 1:13:56
- Label: Sunbeam
- Producer: Steven Carr

The West Coast Pop Art Experimental Band chronology
Transparent Day (1986)	The West Coast Pop Art Experimental Band Companion (2011)

The West Coast Pop Art Experimental Band Companion (sometimes known simply as Companion) is a compilation album by the American psychedelic rock band the West Coast Pop Art Experimental Band (WCPAEB), and was released on Sunbeam Records on June 7, 2011. The album is a collection of demos, tracks that appear on early singles, and rare material that derive mostly from the group members' side-projects before, during, and after the WCPAEB's recording career.

All of the tracks featured on Companion were previously released, although a number of them had never appeared on a commercially accessible album. The first nine tracks, devoted to early projects instigated by Bob Markley as the lead vocalist and record producer, hold insight into the unusual self-appointed frontman's musical style. Perhaps more intriguing are the bands formed by Michael Lloyd and Shaun and Danny Harris—the young masterminds behind the group's enigmatic leader—whose recordings would sometimes manifest themselves on WCPAEB albums and later solo careers. The Laughing Wind, the folk rock predecessor "discovered" by Markley prior to the band's formation, reveals a more embryonic version of what the group would develop into.

The tracks "Sassafras" and "I Won't Hurt You", both from the band's first album Volume One ("Sassafras" only appears as a bonus track on the 1997 reissue of the album), are credited to the WCPAEB. Companion unexpectedly concludes with the avant-garde electronic tune "Leiyla and the Poet" by experimental composer Halim El-Dabh. The album also features an informative booklet with rare photographs of the band members.

== Track listing ==
1. Bob Markley: "Will We Meet Again?" - 2:35
2. Bob Markley: "Tia Juana Ball" - 1:57
3. Bob Markley: "Summer's Comin' On" - 2:23
4. Bob Markley: "It Should've Been Me" - 1:57
5. Lucifer and the Peppermints: "The Green Itch Got the Bear" - 2:41
6. Lucifer and the Peppermints: "Money Back Guarantee" - 2:18
7. Bobby Rebel: "Valley of Tears" - 2:32
8. Bobby Rebel: "Teardrops from My Eyes" - 2:21
9. Judy Brown: "I'm Such a Fool" - 2:25
10. Sonny Knight: "A Swingin' Door" - 1:45
11. Sonny Knight: "If You Want This Love" - 2:04
12. The Rogues: "Wanted: Dead or Alive" - 2:28
13. The Laughing Wind: "Good to Be Around" - 2:53
14. The Laughing Wind: "Don't Take Very Much to See Tomorrow" - 1:54
15. The Laughing Wind: "John Works Hard" - 2:07
16. The Laughing Wind: "The Bells" - 2:27
17. The West Coast Pop Art Experimental Band: "Sassafras" - 2:02
18. The West Coast Pop Art Experimental Band: "I Won't Hurt You" - 2:11
19. Neo Maya: "I Won't Hurt You" - 2:30
20. Boystown: "Hello Mr. Sun" - 2:17
21. Boystown: "End of the Line" - 2:32
22. California Spectrum: "She May Call You Up Tonite" - 2:30
23. Rockit: "Blame It on the Pony Express" - 2:55
24. Rockit: "Amblin'" - 2:05
25. Brigadune: "I'll Cry Out from My Grave (God I'm Sorry)" - 2:50
26. Brigadune: "Misty Mornin'" - 3:10
27. Brigadune: "My Wife Likes To" - 2:14
28. California Spectrum: "Rainbo" - 2:07
29. Halim El-Dabh: "Leiyla and the Poet" - 7:32
