= FiFo Records =

The "I Won't Hurt You" single. Note the caricature of Bob Markley.

FiFo Records was an American record label established by singer-songwriters Bob Markley and Baker Knight in Los Angeles, California, in 1961. Following Markley's unsuccessful stint with Warner Bros. Records as a solo artist, he teamed up with Knight, a co-writer on both of Markley's two singles, to found the label, which recorded a variety of pop, R&B, and folk musical acts. FiFo is best-known, however, as the label that released the debut album by the psychedelic rock group the West Coast Pop Art Experimental Band (The WCPAEB) in 1966.

All the recordings issued on FiFo were licensed through RHM (Robert H. Markley) Publishing. Aside from the WCPAEB, another notable artist on the label was Sonny Knight, a seasoned musician who had a national hit in 1956 with "Confidential". Although not particularly successful, the doo wop group the Triangles recorded the single "My Oh My", which has become a valuable collector's item that sells for as much as $700. Markley produced all the sessions, provided his "trademark" bongos, and carries a writing credit for all the singles released (often in collaboration with Baker Knight).

The label is well known among WCPAEB followers for distributing the band's debut album Volume One in 1966. Recorded mostly before Markley was a band member, the album consists of a handful of cover versions of popular songs and some original material by the Laughing Wind, the group that developed into the WCPAEB. The "FiFo fan" imprinted on some of the releases was a caricature of Markley that was later revived for the compilation album The West Coast Pop Art Experimental Band Companion in 2011.
