= Vol. 2 (Breaking Through) =

Studio album by The West Coast Pop Art Experimental Band
- Released: October 1967
- Genre: Psychedelic rock, experimental rock
- Length: 36:32
- Label: Reprise
- Producer: Jimmy Bowen, Bob Markley

The West Coast Pop Art Experimental Band chronology
Part One (1967)	Vol. 2 (Breaking Through) (1967)	Volume 3: A Child's Guide to Good and Evil (1968)

Professional ratings
Review scores
Source	Rating
AllMusic	2/5 stars

Volume 2 (Breaking Through) is the third album by the American psychedelic rock group, the West Coast Pop Art Experimental Band, and was released in October 1967 on Reprise Records (R 6270 mono, RS 6270 stereo). At the time of recording, Michael Lloyd was not present so the group was reduced to Bob Markley and the Harris brothers, with additional uncredited contributions from Ron Morgan. On the back of original LP release appears 'Breaking Through' and the declaration: "Every song in this album has been written, arranged, sung and played by the group. No one censored us. We got to say everything we wanted to say, in the way we wanted to say it".

"Smell of Incense", composed by Markley and Morgan, features a slowed down pulsating bass melody similar to The Beatles' song "Day Tripper". The track "Suppose They Gave a War and No One Comes" actually copies direct quotes from an address by Franklin Roosevelt on August 14, 1936 at Chautauqua, New York.

== Track listing ==
All tracks written by Bob Markley and Shaun Harris, except where noted.

1. "In the Arena" – 4:10
2. "Suppose They Give a War and No One Comes" (Markley, Roger Bryant) – 3:38
3. "Buddha" – 2:05
4. "Smell of Incense" (Markley, Ron Morgan) – 5:47
5. "Overture / Wcpaeb Part II" – 1:28
6. "Queen Nymphet" – 2:19
7. "Unfree Child" – 3:58
8. "Carte Blanche" – 2:42
9. "Delicate Fawn" – 2:30
10. "Tracy Had a Hard Day Sunday" – 4:35

== Singles ==
- "Suppose They Give a War and No One Comes" b/w "Queen Nymphet"
- "Smell of Incense" b/w "Unfree Child"

== Personnel ==
West Coast Pop Art Experimental Band

- Bob Markley – vocals
- Danny Harris – vocals, electric guitar
- Ron Morgan – electric guitar (uncredited)
- Shaun Harris – vocals, bass guitar

Additional musicians

- Hal Blaine - drums
- Jim Gordon - drums

== Covers ==
- "Suppose They Give a War and No One Comes" covered by T.S.O.L.
- "Smell of Incense" covered by Southwest F.O.B.
- "Tracy Had a Hard Day Sunday" covered by The Clientele
