= FIFO =

FIFO may refer to:

== First in, first out ==
First in, first out describes a method of managing items in storage:

- FIFO in stock rotation, particularly to avoid food spoilage
- FIFO (computing and electronics), a method of queuing or memory management
  - Queue (abstract data type), data abstraction of the queuing concept
- FIFO (electronic), a digital circuit that stores and outputs data in the order received
- FIFO and LIFO accounting, methods used in managing inventory and financial matters

== People ==
- Fifó (born 2000), Portuguese futsal player

== Other uses ==
- FIFO (film festival) (Festival International du Film Documentaire Océanien), documentary film festival held in Tahiti
- FiFo Records, an American record label
- Fly-in fly-out, a human resources strategy for deployment of personnel to remote locations

== See also ==
- LIFO (disambiguation)
- First expired, first out (FEFO)
- First come, first served
