= The West Coast Pop Art Experimental Band =

American psychedelic rock band

- From left to right: Bob Markley, Michael Lloyd (bottom), Danny Harris, Shaun Harris, and John Ware.

Background information
- Origin: Los Angeles, California, United States
- Genres: Psychedelic rock; folk rock; experimental rock
- Years active: 1965–1970
- Labels: FiFo; Reprise; Amos; Forward
- Past members: Bob Markley; Shaun Harris; Danny Harris; Michael Lloyd; Ron Morgan; John Ware
- Website: https://www.westcoastpopartexperimentalband.com/

The West Coast Pop Art Experimental Band (WCPAEB) was an American psychedelic rock band formed in Los Angeles, California, in 1965.

Aspiring musician and scenester Bob Markley managed to join the group the Laughing Wind in exchange for his connections in the music industry and substantial bankroll. The original five-piece line-up consisted of Michael Lloyd (rhythm guitar, vocals), Shaun Harris (bass guitar, vocals), Danny Harris (lead guitar, vocals), John Ware (drums), and Markley (tambourine, vocals).

The band debuted with the album Volume One in 1966 on the small FiFo record label. In the early years of the group, much was made of the WCPAEB's elaborate psychedelic light shows, which became the focal point of their live performances in Los Angeles. Following the release of Volume One, the WCPAEB signed with Reprise Records, recording three albums with the company, including arguably their most accomplished work Volume 3: A Child's Guide to Good and Evil in 1968. Two additional albums, Where's My Daddy? and Markley, A Group, were distributed on independent labels before the group disbanded in 1970.

== History ==
=== Formation and first album (1966) ===
The group was formed in August 1965 when Los Angeles playboy Bob Markley, a wealthy law graduate and adopted son of an oil tycoon, organized a party at his home in Beverly Hills. Markley previously hosted the television program Oklahoma Bandstand in 1958, until he was signed by a Warner Bros. Records executive, and purchased a luxury mansion in Los Angeles. He released two commercially unsuccessful singles, "Will We Meet Again" and "Summer's Comin' On", between 1960 and 1961, and produced recordings for some musical acts, including Lucifer and the Peppermints, Bobby Rebel, and Sonny Knight on Markley's own local record labels. In attendance at Markley's party were dozens of journalists, deejays, and various individuals of the "in-crowd", as well as live performances by Al Kooper followed by the Yardbirds. Producer Kim Fowley introduced Markley to Michael Lloyd, and brothers Shaun and Danny Harris, members of the group the Laughing Wind.

Lloyd began his music career in 1962 in an instrumental surf rock band which included Jimmy Greenspoon, known as the New Dimensions and later the AlleyKats. The group entered Stereo Masters studio to record three albums, during which time Lloyd first became acquainted with Fowley. While attending the Hollywood Professional School, Lloyd befriended the Harris brothers, who recorded the regional hit "Ski Storm" with rival act the Snowmen. In early 1965, Shaun Harris collaborated with Lloyd in his newly formed band the Rogues, releasing the Harris-Lloyd composition "Wanted: Dead or Alive", on Fowley's Living Legend label. Shortly thereafter, with Danny Harris and drummer John Ware in the fold, Lloyd and Shaun formed the Laughing Wind, which recorded the single "Good to Be Around" for Tower Records later that year. Recordings made or produced by these pre-WCPAEB acts were collected years later on the compilation album, The West Coast Pop Art Experimental Band Companion in 2011.

Markley became motivated by the large crowd a rock band like the Yardbirds attracted, particularly the number of teenage girls, and proposed he would finance and secure a recording contract for the Laughing Wind, in exchange for his inclusion into the group. Impressed and slightly seduced by the much older Markley's wealth and entourage, the band accepted his offer. The decision to record as the West Coast Pop Art Experimental Band, rather than the Laughing Wind, was made by Markley, who envisioned the band as a west coast counterpart to the Velvet Underground. Looking to have something tangible to represent the band, in 1966, the WCPAEB released their debut album on Markley's FiFo label, Volume One. Much of the album was recorded at Lloyd's personal studio and a rented store-front on La Cienega Boulevard, before Markley joined the group; however, tracks such as "Don't Break My Balloon" and "If You Want This Love" indicate he had some influence over the later sessions for the album's development. While Volume One did feature a small selection of original material, the majority of the album was cover versions including "Louie Louie", "You Really Got Me", and "It's All Over Now, Baby Blue".

=== Reprise years (1967–1968) ===
The WCPAEB embarked on their first tour in June 1966, establishing themselves as a live favorite with Los Angeles hippies at venues such as the Other Place and Wild Thing. The group shared the bill with the Mothers of Invention, the Seeds, Iron Butterfly, and the Yardbirds, among others. According to Ware, the group's performances were "the ultimate street happening for a while"; highlighted by their ambitious psychedelic light show, which was operated by Buddy Walters, who also arranged light shows for Jimi Hendrix and the Animals. In a review of a gig in 1967, the Los Angeles Free Press commended the WCPAEB's musicianship, but was critical of Markley for his "hypster" attitude and non-rhythmic tambourine playing. Although his bandmates did not like his pretentious on and off-stage antics, Markley did manage to negotiate a three-album deal with talent scouts of Reprise Records who had attended WCPAEB's performances.

In May 1967, the band recorded and released their first album for Reprise, Part One. By the time recording sessions began, Markley had assumed absolute control of the WCPAEB's publishing rights, which explains his unusual selection for the A-side of the album's singles: a "spoken rap" composition "1906", co-penned with session musician Ron Morgan, and a cover of the Mothers of Invention's song "Help, I'm a Rock". The album itself featured songs that exhibited a wide-ranging stylistic variety, including Byrds-esque folk rock, garage rock, and Baroque pop. The song "I Won't Hurt You" was one of two compositions (the other being "If You Want This Love") from the group's debut album re-recorded for Part One, where it was given a much more subdued atmosphere and a heartbeat rhythm. Shaun Harris sang the reworked version of "I Won't Hurt You", rather than Lloyd, who, aside from some backing vocals on the album, would not sing lead on a WCPAEB release until the 1969 album Where's My Daddy?.

Markley and Lloyd did not get on, which led to the latter leaving the group and Morgan joining full-time. According to Lloyd, Markley became increasingly overbearing on the WCPAEB's creative output, and "he started to believe that he was like, you know, the real deal, as opposed to the guy who doesn't sing and doesn't really have any musical thoughts and stuff like that. He wasn't content anymore just being the guy who ended up with the girls that he could get from it". Lloyd remained in Los Angeles and participated in a number of studio projects with Fowley and Mike Curb such as October Country, the Smoke, St. John Green, and the Fire Escape.

In August 1967, just prior to recording sessions for the WCPAEB's second Reprise album, Shaun Harris took a hiatus from the band. His departure was partly due to his disillusionment with the group, primarily with the WCPAEB's lack of success, and it served as a waiting period while his brother, Danny, was being treated for depression. He formed the California Spectrum with Danny, Lloyd, and Jimmy Greenspoon. The group toured the Midwest with Markley's state-of-the-art light show, and released two singles in its brief recording career, "Sassafras" (the same version featured on Volume One) and a cover of the Left Banke's "She May Call You Up Tonight", none of which were met with much attention. When Harris returned to the WCPAEB in 1968, he touted a completely different line-up, and promoted the California Spectrum with his column in the teen zine Tiger Beat until the group disbanded sometime in early 1969.

In late 1967, the WCPAEB released their third album, Vol. 2 (Breaking Through), which was the band's most ambitious, albeit less consistent than its predecessor, work to date. The album featured a peculiar cover photo of Markley and the Harris brothers sitting bare-chested in a silver bathroom, and a bold declaration on the backside: "Every song in this album has been written, arranged, sung and played by the group. No one censored us. We got to say everything we wanted to say, in the way we wanted to say it". For the first time, each track was credited either in whole or in part to members of the WCPAEB; however, Markley's manic narratives and questionable lyrical content (particularly young girls) dominate the record. An edited version of the Morgan-Markley composition "Smell of Incense" was issued just ahead of Vol. 2 (Breaking Through), but it failed to chart. The Dallas psychedelic pop group Southwest FOB covered the song in 1968, which reached No. 56 on the Billboard Hot 100. Among its ten tracks, the album included the politically satirical "In the Arena", possibly inspired by the Watts riots. Vol. 2 (Breaking Through) also features the anti-war song "Suppose They Gave a War and No One Comes", the full version of "Smell of Incense", and a rare instance of Markley singing is found on "Unfree Child".

The WCPAEB's fourth album Volume 3: A Child's Guide to Good and Evil was released in July 1968. The album represented a creative leap forward for the band and is often considered their most accomplished work. Band biographer Tim Forster described Volume 3 as the group's "most extraordinary achievement", one which utilized a "bizarre fusion of innocence and malice" heavily affected by the "exuberance of the British Invasion, folk rock, and flower power-era" being "swept away in a tide of bad drugs, paranoia, and protest". The album also saw Morgan experimenting with the droning quality of the electric sitar, featured prominently on "Ritual #1", "Until the Poorest of People Have Money", the title track, and "Ritual #2". In addition, Volume 3's front cover design showcased the "butterfly mind" artwork of John Van Hamersveld, who also is credited with the covers of Crown of Creation, Exile on Main St., and Magical Mystery Tour. Like the WCPAEB's earlier albums, Volume 3 failed to sell in sufficient quantities to reach the U.S. charts, and Reprise dropped the band.

=== Independent labels (1969–1970) ===
Late in 1968, Jimmy Bowen established his label Amos Records and signed the group the following year. While the band worked on the Where's My Daddy? album, Danny Harris rejoined and Lloyd returned to provide backing vocals and co-write "Where's My Daddy?", "Where Money Rules Everything", and "Coming of Age in L.A." with Markley. It became apparent on the album, however, that the echoing vocal harmonies found on the band's preceding works were replaced by a closely-miked sound. The album loosely possessed the components of a concept piece, narrated through the eyes of a young homeless girl named "Poor Patty" as she journeys through the chaos of post-Summer of Love Los Angeles. However, Where's My Daddy?, as well as its accompanying single "Free as Bird", failed to reverse the WCPAEB's commercial fortunes, and it is regarded by critics and fans as the group's most lackluster album release.

Lloyd negotiated with Curb to distribute the group's fifth and final album on Forward Records. Released in 1970, Markley insisted the album, originally self-titled, should be released under the name Markley, A Group. The album benefited from the full involvement and production experience of Lloyd, who sang the majority of the lead vocals, provided keyboards, and organized the orchestral arrangements. Danny Harris was a key influence on the album, writing half of its tracks. However, although the album is generally considered an improvement over Where's My Daddy?, the group could no longer cope with Markley's erratic behavior, and disbanded soon after the album's release.

== Aftermath ==
Markley continued his playboy lifestyle at a beach house he purchased in Los Angeles. He produced Jim Stallings' (J. J. Light) European hit "Heya" and the album of the same name before vanishing from the music business. According to various accounts by band members and Fowley, in 1972 Markley had evaded imprisonment and kept a low-profile after an incident involving two underage girls. Markley sporadically contacted his former bandmates; however, Fowley recollected a conversation with Stallings in 1992: "He [Stallings] told me that Bob had been sitting in this rowing boat on a lake near Las Vegas - he was like a recluse. It got loose from its moorings and he drifted off alone for a day and a half. He was already pretty messed up, but he got very badly dehydrated. When they eventually found him he was taken to some hospital and placed on a life-support system, unable to speak or think". Markley died on September 9, 2003, in a hospital in Gardena, California; he was 68.

At age 20, Curb appointed Lloyd vice-president of MGM Records. In the 1970s, he became a successful record producer for teen idols, including the Osmonds, Shaun Cassidy, and Leif Garrett. In 1986, he was music supervisor for the soundtrack of the film Dirty Dancing, and has been involved in several other movie soundtracks well into the 2000s. Shaun Harris collaborated with Lloyd to release Harris's self-titled debut solo album in 1973, which explored his country rock influences. Later on, he became the president of Barry Manilow's publishing company and most recently Harris has written a play about his life. Although Danny Harris was initially disillusioned with the music industry, he recorded the gospel album Thank Him Every Day in 1980. He also worked as a folk musician and actor before dying on the set of Saving Mr. Banks from a heart attack on October 1, 2012. Morgan helped found Three Dog Night (though left before they found commercial success) and joined the Electric Prunes for their album Just Good Old Rock and Roll. He died in 1989 aged 44.

== Band members ==
- Bob Markley (August 29, 1935 – September 9, 2003) – tambourine, spoken word, vocals (1965–1970)
- Michael Lloyd (born November 3, 1948) – rhythm guitar, keyboards, vocals (1965–1967, 1969–1970)
- Shaun Harris (born March 2, 1946) – bass, vocals (1965–1970)
- Danny Harris (March 19, 1947 – October 1, 2012) – lead guitar, vocals (1965–1967, 1969–1970)
- John Ware (born May 2, 1944) – drums (1966–1968)
- Ron Morgan (1945 – 1989) – lead guitar, sitar (1967–1970)

== Discography ==
=== Studio albums ===
- Volume One (1966)
- Part One (1967)
- Vol. 2 (Breaking Through) (1967)
- Volume 3: A Child's Guide to Good and Evil (1968)
- Where's My Daddy? (1969)
- Markley, A Group (1970)

=== Compilation albums ===
- Legendary Unreleased Albums on the Raspberry Sawfly label (1980)
- Transparent Day Sampler on Edsel Records ED 180 (1986)
- The West Coast Pop Art Experimental Band Companion (2011)

=== Singles ===
- FiFo Records
  - "Sassafras" b/w "I Won't Hurt You" (1966)
- Reprise Records
  - "1906" b/w "Shifting Sands" (1967)
  - "Help, I'm a Rock" b/w "Transparent Day" (1967)
  - "Suppose They Give a War and No One Comes" b/w "Queen Nymphet" (1967)
  - "Smell of Incense" b/w "Unfree Child" (1968)
- Amos Records
  - "Free as Bird" b/w "Where's My Daddy?" (1969)
