= The Fire Escape =

American psychedelic rock band

The Fire Escape was an American psychedelic rock band formed in San Francisco, California, in 1967. Existing mainly as a studio group composed of unknown session musicians, the band was masterminded by record producer Kim Fowley and Michael Lloyd. The project produced one album called Psychotic Reaction, which contained mainly cover versions of popular songs from the era. It is reported that Sky Saxon of the garage rock band, the Seeds and Mars Bonfire of Steppenwolf, played on some of the tracks.

== History ==
Prior to the Fire Escape's formation, Michael Lloyd had been involved in multiple projects including the West Coast Pop Art Experimental Band (WCPAEB), the Smoke, and October Country, among others. Lloyd had collaborated with record producer Kim Fowley ever since he was introduced to him during Lloyd's stint with the WCPAEB, recording a Fowley solo album and later, in 1968, an album for the psychedelic rock band St. John Green. Although how the Fire Escape formed is not revealed, liner notes on the band's album humorously details how a couple of individuals are in search of where the Fire Escape was performing, only to find them regularly playing in "a club called the Gutter". For recording, Lloyd and Fowley teamed up with production duo Larry Goldberg and Harry Levine, who assembled a group of uncredited session musicians for the project.

Eight of the 10 tracks on Psychotic Reaction are cover versions of popular garage rock compositions from the era, including the title track "Psychotic Reaction" by the Count Five, the Music Machine's proto-punk tune "Talk Talk", and ? and the Mysterians' "96 Tears". The two originals, credited to Goldberg and Levine, are "Blood Beat" and "Journey's End", while the tune "L.S.D." is an explicit reference to acid originally recorded by Thee Midniters (as "Love Special Delivery"). Strong speculation points to Sky Saxon of the Seeds, Mars Bonfire of Steppenwolf, and Fowley as some of the session musicians playing on the tracks. Some of the evidence attributing to Saxon's supposed involvement include the two Seeds compositions, "Trip Maker" and "Pictures and Designs", and that the Fire Escape shared his record label GNP Crescendo.

Psychotic Reaction was released in 1967, and the group disbanded soon after. One music critic writes the album "is still being regarded as a pretty collectable item, being a kind of a precursor to the Nuggets-and-related concepts, no less than five years before Lenny Kaye's own 'comprehension' of the whole thing". In 2007, Fallout Records reissued the album on vinyl, and in 2009 GNP Crescendo made Psychotic Reaction available on compact disc.

== Psychotic Reaction album ==
=== Track listing ===
==== Side one ====
1. "Psychotic Reaction" - 2:50
2. "Talk Talk " - 1:50
3. "Love Special Delivery (L.S.D.)" - 2:14
4. "The Trip" - 1:48
5. "96 Tears" - 2:31

==== Side two ====
1. "Blood Beat" - 2:08
2. "Trip Maker" - 2:53
3. "Journey's End" - 2:39
4. "Pictures and Designs" - 2:28
5. "Fortune Teller" - 2:15
