= Hey You =

Hey You, Hey You!, Hey, You, Hey, You!, or variants may refer to:

== Music ==
=== Albums ===
- Hey, You (EP), an EP by the Japanese post-rock band Mono
- Hey You, a 1999 album by Jack Ingram
- Hey You: The Essential Collection 1988–1990, a 1998 compilation album by Youssou N'Dour

=== Songs ===
- "Hey You!", by Andrew Horowitz (or edu) from sketches 3d
- "Hey You!", single by Black Lace
- "Hey You!" by No Doubt
- "Hey You" (311 song)
- "Hey You" (Bachman–Turner Overdrive song)
- "Hey You" (Disturbed song)
- "Hey You" (Madonna song)
- "Hey You" (Pink Floyd song)
- "Hey You" (The Quireboys song)
- "Hey You", by A1 from Here We Come
- "Hey You", by Aaron Carter from Oh Aaron
- "Hey You", by Big Mello from Done Deal
- "Hey You", by Blaze Ya Dead Homie from Colton Grundy: The Undying
- "Hey You!", by Bomb the Bass from Into the Dragon
- "Hey You", by Boys Like Girls from Crazy World
- "Hey You", by Chris Rea from Water Sign
- "Hey You", by The Clarks from Another Happy Ending
- "Hey You", by CNBLUE from Ear Fun
- "Hey You", by The Connells from Ring
- "Hey You", by Cool for August from Grand World
- "Hey You!!!", by The Cure from Kiss Me, Kiss Me, Kiss Me
- "Hey You", by Day of Fire from Losing All
- "Hey You", by Dinosaur Pile-Up from Growing Pains
- "Hey You!", by Divine from Maid in England
- "Hey You", by Dr. Sin from Brutal
- "Hey You", by The Exies from Head for the Door
- "Hey You", by Faster Pussycat from The Power and the Glory Hole
- "Hey You", by Floetry from Floetic
- "Hey You", by Foolish Things from Let's Not Forget the Story
- "Hey You", by Godhead from The Shadow Line
- "Hey You", by Gordon Lightfoot from Dream Street Rose
- "Hey You", by Heart from Red Velvet Car
- "Hey You", by Jamie Scott and the Town from Park Bench Theories
- "Hey You", by Johnny Winter from Let Me In
- "Hey You", by Jun-ho of 2PM
- "Hey You", by Kim Appleby from the self-titled album
- "Hey You!", by Kim Wilde from Come Out and Play
- "Hey You", by Lea Michele from Places
- "Hey You", by The Lurkers from Fulham Fallout
- "Hey You", by Malcolm Middleton from Sleight of Heart
- "Hey You", by Miranda Cosgrove from Sparks Fly
- "Hey You", by Modern Talking from Ready for Romance
- "Hey You!", by No Doubt from Tragic Kingdom
- "Hey You", by Opshop from You Are Here
- "Hey You", by Oz from Heavy Metal Heroes
- "Hey, You", by Paula Seling from Culeg Vise
- "Hey You", by The Pharcyde from Labcabincalifornia
- "Hey You", by Phunk Junkeez from The 96' Lost Tapes
- "Hey You", by The Pointer Sisters from Contact
- "Hey You", by Pony Pony Run Run from You Need Pony Pony Run Run
- "Hey You", by Scorpions from Animal Magnetism
- "Hey You", by Scatman John from Scatman's World
- "Hey You", by Shakira from Oral Fixation, Vol. 2
- "Hey You", by Silkk the Shocker from Based on a True Story
- "Hey You", by Sims from Bad Time Zoo
- "Hey You", by Sistar from Give It to Me
- "Hey You", by Smooth from You Been Played
- "Hey You", by Stereo Fuse
- "Hey You", by Styles of Beyond featuring Mike Shinoda from Reseda Beach
- "Hey You", by Thin Lizzy from Chinatown
- "Hey You", by Tokio Hotel from Humanoid
- "Hey You", by Tommy Stinson from Village Gorilla Head
- "Hey You", by Ultrabeat from The Weekend Has Landed
- "Hey You (Batch of Lies)", a 1998 song by Black Label Society from Sonic Brew
- "Hey You (Looking at the Moon)", a 1974 song by Graham Nash from Wild Tales
- "Eh, Tú" (Spanish for "Hey, You"), a song by El Canto del Loco from Personas
- "Hei, tu!" (Romanian for "Hey, You!"), a song by Iris
- "Hey du" (German for "Hey You"), a 2009 song by Sido from Aggro Berlin
- "望塵莫及" (Chinese for "Hey You"), a 2008 song by Stanley Huang from We All Lay Down in the End
- "Hey U", by Basement Jaxx from Crazy Itch Radio

== Television and films ==
- Hey You! (TV series), a 1967 Australian television comedy series
- Hey You (film), a 2022 Nigerian romantic comedy

== See also ==
- Hey Ya (disambiguation)
- "Hey You! Get Off My Mountain", a 1973 single by The Dramatics
- "(Hey You) The Rock Steady Crew", a 1983 UK top 10 hit single by Rock Steady Crew
