= Where's My Daddy? =

Studio album by the West Coast Pop Art Experimental Band
- Released: 1969
- Genre: Psychedelic rock; psychedelic pop
- Length: 29:02
- Label: Amos
- Producer: Jimmy Bowen, Bob Markley

The West Coast Pop Art Experimental Band chronology
Volume 3: A Child's Guide to Good and Evil (1968)	Where's My Daddy? (1969)	Markley A Group (1970)

Professional ratings
Review scores
Source	Rating
AllMusic	1.5/5 stars

Where's My Daddy? is the fifth album by the American psychedelic rock group, the West Coast Pop Art Experimental Band, and was released in 1969 on Amos Records, which was owned by Jimmy Bowen. Amos Records signed them after Reprise Records dropped the band from their label following the commercial failure of their first three albums. It features compositions by Danny Harris, Michael Lloyd and Shaun Harris with lyrics by Bob Markley. On the original pressing, Lloyd's contributions were not noted on the back cover as a type of punishment by Markley for recent disagreements with each other. However, promotional copies do show Michael Lloyd's contributions noted on the back cover.

Overall, it is a concept album about a young homeless girl named "Poor Patty", and her journey through Los Angeles after the Summer of Love. It begins innocently, from the perspective of "Patty", to the climatically horrific ending. By the ending track, "Two People", "Patty" is beaten and raped and attempts to plead a case to an inattentive judge.

On past albums it was traditional for Markley to perform the spoken word in which he says what "part" the band is on. There is one part for each album since Part One at a chosen point. In this case however, an unidentified young girl takes the role by speaking, "Part four, The West Coast Pop Art Experimental Band" on the track "Everyone's Innocent Daughter".

== Track listing ==
1. "Where's My Daddy?" (Markley, Lloyd) – 2:14
2. "Where Money Rules Everything" (Markley, Lloyd) – 1:58
3. "Hup Two! Hup Two!" (Markley, D. Harris) – 1:49
4. "My Dog Back Home" (Markley, D. Harris) – 3:20
5. "Give Me Your Lovething" (Markley, S. Harris) – 3:51
6. "Outside/Inside" (Markley, S. Harris) – 2:31
7. "Everyone's Innocent Daughter" (Markley, S. Harris) – 2:32
8. "Free as a Bird" (Markley, S. Harris) – 2:04
9. "Not One Bummer" (Markley, S. Harris) – 1:25
10. "Have You Met My Pet Pig" (Markley, S. Harris) – 2:05
11. "Coming of Age in L.A." (Markley, Lloyd) – 2:57
12. "Two People" (Markley, S. Harris) – 2:16

== Single ==
- "Free as a Bird" b/w "Where's My Daddy?"

== Personnel ==
- Bob Markley: vocals
- Danny Harris: vocals, electric guitar
- Michael Lloyd: vocals, electric guitar
- Ron Morgan: electric guitar
- Shaun Harris: vocals, bass guitar
