= Belinda (Belinda Carlisle album) =

Studio album by Belinda Carlisle
- Released: May 19, 1986
- Recorded: 1985–1986
- Studios: Guerilla Studios (North London, England)
- Genre: Pop rock
- Length: 37:08
- Label: I.R.S.
- Producer: Michael Lloyd

Belinda Carlisle chronology
Belinda (1986)	Heaven on Earth (1987)

Singles from Belinda
- 1. "Mad About You" Released: 1986; 2. "I Feel the Magic" Released: 1986; 3. "Band of Gold" Released: 1986; 4. "Shot In the Dark" Released: 1986

Belinda is the debut studio album by American singer Belinda Carlisle. It was released on May 19, 1986 by I.R.S. Records. Carlisle began work on the album in 1985 following the breakup of the Go-Go's, for whom she was the lead singer. The album was supported by four singles, with lead single "Mad About You" peaking at number 3 on the US Billboard Hot 100 and No. 1 in Canada.

== Composition ==
Some of the songs on Belinda were written by Carlisle's former bandmates in the Go-Go's Charlotte Caffey and Paula Jean Brown while the rest of the tracks were written by other songwriters such as the Bangles' Susanna Hoffs. Carlisle has a single co-writing credit on one track ("Gotta Get to You").

"Band of Gold" was a hit song for Freda Payne in 1970, which Carlisle covered for this album. Although Payne herself does not appear on the album version of the track, John Luongo overdubbed and remixed the track for a single release, which included prominent backing vocals by Payne. The 7-inch single was only issued in Canada (where it hit No. 91 on the charts), but Payne's vocals were also heard on the dance mixes of Carlisle's version of the song, which were issued on a 12-inch single in the US. The various "Band of Gold" remixes would later appear as bonus tracks on the 2003 re-release of the album.

"I Need a Disguise" was written by the team of Tom Kelly and Billy Steinberg, who co-wrote the song with Susanna Hoffs, as it was originally intended for use by the Bangles. Kelly and Steinberg also co-wrote another song for Carlisle called "Dancing in the City", which she would eventually record and would later appear on the soundtrack for the 1987 movie Burglar. "Stuff and Nonsense" is a cover of Tim Finn's song originally performed by his band Split Enz on their 1979 album Frenzy. The song "Shot in the Dark" appeared on the soundtrack for the film Out of Bounds (1986).

== Reception ==
=== Commercial ===
The album was successful in North America, peaking at No. 13 on the Billboard 200 and at number 24 on the Canadian Albums chart. It was moderately successful in Australia, where it peaked at number 42 and charted for 12 weeks. Belinda was certified Gold in the US and Platinum in Canada, selling over one million copies worldwide.

=== Critical ===
Professional ratings
Review scores
Source	Rating
AllMusic	4/5 stars
Classic Pop	3/5 stars
Q	4/5 stars
The Village Voice	C

Upon release, Belinda was met with mixed reviews from critics. Gary Graff of the Detroit Free Press praised it as "a promising, eclectic album that almost matches her ex-group's work." People called it "a smooth, entertaining transition to solo status" with "melodically satisfying" songs, crediting Michael Lloyd's production with managing "to evoke the sound of early rock without seeming to parody it". Billboard stated that Carlisle "swings toward a broader, mainstream appeal with this first solo set ... Less tongue-in-cheek than her old band's work, this is generally lively, uptempo pop given an early '60s sweep by producer Lloyd." In a less enthusiastic review for The Village Voice, Robert Christgau panned the album as "vacuous would-be CHR", while in Rolling Stone, Mark Coleman questioned the teaming of "an intuitive, punk-bred performer like Carlisle ... with a cadre of studio pros", concluding that "the problem with Belinda is that all the ingredients are there, but the end result just doesn't feel right."

Retrospectively, Steve Harnell of Classic Pop noted that "retaining Go-Go's guitarist Charlotte Caffey as the major songwriter on this debut LP allowed for some sense of familiarity amongst the Brave New World of Carlisle's solo career. Caffey supplied five songs on Belinda, a record that spins through a myriad [of] styles as Carlisle searched for a new musical direction ... Belinda certainly had its moments, but there was still much work to be done in establishing Carlisle as a solo act." Stephen Thomas Erlewine of AllMusic commented that "the pop on Belinda may not be as infectious as the Go-Go's' finest singles, yet it fit in well with the slick formats of mid-'80s radio and managed to be more memorable than many of the mainstream hits of the time, as the ingratiating hit 'Mad About You' proves."

== Track listing ==
Side one
No.	Title	Writer(s)	Length
1.	"Mad About You"	Paula Jean Brown; James Whelan; Mitchel Young Evans	3:36
2.	"I Need a Disguise"	Tom Kelly; Billy Steinberg; Susanna Hoffs	3:55
3.	"Since You've Gone"	Charlotte Caffey; Lindsey Buckingham; Jonathan Segal	3:12
4.	"I Feel the Magic"	Caffey; Segal	3:20
5.	"I Never Wanted a Rich Man"	Caffey	4:12

Side two
No.	Title	Writer(s)	Length
1.	"Band of Gold"	Edythe Wayne; Ron Dunbar	3:42
2.	"Gotta Get to You"	Caffey; Belinda Carlisle; Brown; Whelan	4:06
3.	"From the Heart"	Charlotte Caffey; Tom Caffey	3:12
4.	"Shot in the Dark"	Brown; Whelan	3:23
5.	"Stuff and Nonsense"	Tim Finn	4:30

2003 CD bonus tracks
No.	Title	Writer(s)	Length
11.	"Mad About You" (extended version)	Brown; Whelan; Evans	5:26
12.	"Band of Gold" (extended version) (featuring Freda Payne)	Wayne; Dunbar	6:42
13.	"Band of Gold" (dub mix) (featuring Freda Payne)	Wayne; Dunbar	7:43
14.	"Band of Gold" (single mix) (featuring Freda Payne)	Wayne; Dunbar	3:41

== Personnel ==
Musicians

- Belinda Carlisle – lead vocals, backing vocals
- Jim Cox – keyboards, synthesizers
- Claude Gaudette – keyboards, synthesizers
- Nicky Hopkins – keyboards, synthesizers
- Michael Lloyd – keyboards, synthesizers
- Bobby Martin – keyboards, synthesizers, saxophone (6)
- Phil Shenale – keyboards, synthesizers
- Charlotte Caffey – guitars, backing vocals
- Laurence Juber – guitars
- David Lindley – guitars
- Andy Taylor – guitars
- Dennis Belfield – bass
- Paula Brown – bass, backing vocals
- Paul Leim – drums
- Paulinho da Costa – percussion
- John Rosenberg – trumpet (10)
- John D'Andrea – string arrangements (3, 6, 10)
- Sid Sharp – string direction (3, 6, 10)
- Don Griffin – musical instruments (3, 6, 10)
- Elisa Fior – backing vocals
- Susanna Hoffs – backing vocals
- Tom Kelly – backing vocals
- Billy Steinberg – backing vocals
- Jane Wiedlin – backing vocals
- The Waters (Maxine Waters Willard and Julia Waters Tillman) – backing vocals

Technical

- Michael Lloyd – producer, arrangements
- Nathan Lam – associate producer
- Carmine Rubino – engineer
- William Orbit – engineer, remixing
- Dan Nebenzal – assistant engineer
- Tania Hayward – assistant engineer
- Belinda Carlisle – art direction
- Carl Grasso – art direction
- Matthew Rolston – cover photography
- Bradford Bramson – sleeve photography
- Robert Feist – additional vocal production
- Ellen Shipley – additional vocal production
- Ron Stone – management
- Danny Goldberg – management

== Charts ==
=== Weekly charts ===
Weekly chart performance for Belinda
Chart	Peak position
Australian Albums (Kent Music Report)	42
Canada Top Albums/CDs (RPM)	24
US Billboard 200	13
US Cash Box Top 100 Albums	21
Scottish Albums (Official Charts)	85
UK Album Sales (OCC)	57

=== Year-end charts ===
Year-end chart performance for Belinda
Chart (1986)	Position
Canada Top Albums/CDs (RPM)	88
US Billboard 200	83

== Certifications ==
Certifications for Belinda
Region	Certification	Certified units/sales
Canada (Music Canada)	Platinum	100,000^{^}
United States (RIAA)	Gold	500,000^{^}
^{^} Shipments figures based on certification alone.
