= Heya =

Heya or Hey Ya may refer to:

- Heya (sumo) from the Japanese word for "room" (部屋), also in compounds -beya, or Sumo-beya, an organization of sumo wrestlers (pronounced beya when in compound form)
- Hey'a, a variant name for Islamic religious police

== Music ==
- "Heya" (J.J. Light song), a 1967 song by J.J. Light, stage name for Jim Stallings, covered by Krokus on the album Round 13
- "Heya" (Ive song), a 2024 song by Ive
- Heya!, a 1967 album by Jim Stallings as J.J. Light
- "Heya", a 1987 single by George Kranz
- "Heya-hee", a rainsong by Sacred Spirit

== See also ==
- "Hey Ya!", a song by OutKast
- Heyah, a Polish mobile phone service
