= Tears on My Pillow (disambiguation) =

"Tears on My Pillow" is a doo-wop song that was written by Sylvester Bradford and Al Lewis. It was the first hit for Little Anthony and the Imperials in 1958 and later for Kylie Minogue in 1990.

Tears on My Pillow may also refer to:

- Tears on My Pillow (album), a 1969 album by Johnny Tillotson
- "Tears on My Pillow" (Johnny Nash song), 1975
- "Tears on My Pillow", a 1941 hit country song for actor/singer Gene Autry
