= I Feel the Magic =

Single by Belinda Carlisle

from the album Belinda
- B-side: "From the Heart"
- Released: September 2, 1986
- Recorded: 1986
- Genre: Pop
- Length: 3:20
- Label: I.R.S./MCA; Virgin
- Songwriters: Charlotte Caffey; Johnny Segal
- Producer: Michael Lloyd

Belinda Carlisle singles chronology
"Mad About You" (1986)	"I Feel the Magic" (1986)	"Band of Gold" (1986)

"I Feel the Magic" is a song by Belinda Carlisle, released in 1986 as the second single from her debut album as a solo singer, Belinda. The song, having a typical Motown 1960s pop-soul feel, was a minor hit, reaching number 82 on the US Billboard Hot 100.

'Agree Shampoo' used the song in their commercials.

== Music video ==
The music video was directed by Marty Callner.

== Charts ==
Chart (1986)	Peak position
Canadian Top Singles (RPM)	52
US Billboard Hot 100	82
US Cash Box Top 100 Singles	77
