= Markley, A Group =

Studio album by The West Coast Pop Art Experimental Band
- Released: 1970
- Recorded: 1969
- Genre: Psychedelic rock
- Length: 29:14
- Label: Forward
- Producer: Bob Markley, Shaun Harris

The West Coast Pop Art Experimental Band chronology
Where's My Daddy? (1969)	Markley, A Group (1970)	Legendary Unreleased Albums (1980)

Professional ratings
Review scores
Source	Rating
AllMusic	3/5 stars

Markley, A Group is the sixth and final album by the American psychedelic rock group, the West Coast Pop Art Experimental Band, and was released in 1970 on Forward Records, owned by Mike Curb. In this case, the album was released under another group name, Markley A Group, as decided by the group owner, Bob Markley. It features compositions by Danny Harris, Michael Lloyd and Shaun Harris with lyrics by Bob Markley. The content is simple and soft, reminiscent of the band's earlier work. Lyrically, however, the band was continuing the trend set by Where's My Daddy?, in which they describe class resentment, paranoid psychedelia, and an unsettling interest in young girls. Although Shaun Harris creates compositions for the album, he only appears on "Outside/Inside". After this album, like those before it, failed to achieve success, the band ceased to exist.

== Track listing ==
1. "Booker T. & His Electric Shock" (Markley, D. Harris) – 2:22
2. "Next Plane to the Sun" (Markley, Lloyd) – 2:14
3. "Roger the Rocket Ship" (Markley, D. Harris) – 2:45
4. "Elegant Ellen" (Markley, D. Harris) – 2:19
5. "Little Ruby Rain" (Markley, D. Harris) – 3:02
6. "Message for Miniature" (Markley, Lloyd) – 0:26
7. "Sarah the Sad Spirit" (Markley, D. Harris) – 2:36
8. "Truck Stop" (Markley, D. Harris) – 3:20
9. "Zoom! Zoom! Zoom!" (Markley, D. Harris) – 2:12
10. "Sweet Lady Eleven" (Markley, Lloyd) – 2:19
11. "The Magic Cat" (Markley, D. Harris) – 2:59
12. "Outside/Inside" (Markley, S. Harris) – 2:40

== Personnel ==
- Bob Markley: backing vocals, percussion
- Danny Harris: vocals, electric guitar
- Michael Lloyd: vocals, electric guitar
- Shaun Harris: vocals, bass guitar
