= First Expired, First Out =

Term used in field inventory management

First Expired, First Out (FEFO) is a term used in field inventory management to describe a way of dealing with the logistics of products that have a limited shelf life. These items include perishable products or consumer goods with a specified expiration date. The product with the deadline for the next intake will be the first to be served or removed from stock. FEFO is majorly used in the pharmaceutical and chemical industries where expired dates are calculated based on a batch-expired date or shelf-life time.

A common example of this treatment is the management of perishable products in a shelf display: Products with deadlines closest consumption should be used before the other. Foods and pharmaceutical drugs can be sold at a discounted price, and, near the expiration date, they can be destinated to humanitarian aids to the neighbours or to the more distant foreign countries. Perishable goods can also be collected through single donations or some charities.

The First expired, first out logic is a type of stock rotation that enable organizations to get a distribution process optimization, able to minimize the waste generation of finished and yet marketable products.

== Perishable drugs: charity and waste management ==
Perishable goods (like foods and drugs) lose all their use value after the expiration date and can't be bought nor sold as their commercial price and value falls to zero. As the drug or food expiration date comes forth, any perishable good loses its value day-by-day.

Both drugs and foods are equally necessary for the law enforcement of the universal right to life, and, if not reused, they contribute to an expensive waste management form, namely the food waste or the drug waste.

Global Trade Item Number barcode (GTIN, the former EAN) and the Universal Product Code get an all-over-the-world unique identifier, respectively for the product type (the part number) and the single product item (a serial number) or its batch unit, with the related expiring date. The GTIN and UPC codes have become an international standard to improve the food traceability or the drug traceability, as well the Net availability of the product data.

Although Feeding America supply chain applies the GTIN and EAC codes since 2012, at July 2019 nobody of this charity network seems to manage any pharmaceutical drug product

In the United States, it is based also the DrugBank with a comprehensive, freely accessible, online database containing information on drugs and drug targets. But however, it doesn't concern about single items data, in order to become a database (a bank) of such perishable expiring products for humanitarian and charitable purposes.

The Fund for European Aid to Most Deprived is the European version of the Most Deprived Person programme, with the difference that it is managed by a public authority and not by a charity. Its regulation doesn't mention any possible waste management of other kind of perishable goods, such as the pharmaceutical drugs.

== See also ==
- First in, first out (FIFO)
- Last in, first out (LIFO)
- DrugBank
- Food Bank
