= October Country =

Folk rock band

- Origin: Los Angeles, California, United States
- Genres: Folk rock; psychedelic rock
- Years active: 1967–1968
- Label: Epic
- Past members: Caryle De Franca; Joe De Franca; Eddie Beram; Marty Earle; Bruce Wayne; Bob Wian, Ken Babal

October Country was an American folk rock band formed in Los Angeles, California, in 1967. For musician Michael Lloyd, the group was one of his earliest projects with him assuming the role of record producer. It also was another side-project, along with the Smoke, California Spectrum, and the Fire Escape, during a period in which Lloyd was absent from the West Coast Pop Art Experimental Band. October Country recorded one self-titled album in 1968 and is best-remembered for the track "My Girlfriend Is a Witch". They are credited as the musicians for the Steven Spielberg short-film, Amblin'.

== History ==
October Country was formed by siblings Caryle, also known as Carol, (vocals) and Joe De Fransa (vocals), who both started out singing in church choirs. In 1966, the Fransa family moved to Los Angeles, California, where the two hoped to engage themselves in the city's folk rock scene. They recruited a full-fledged band consisting of Eddie Beram (drums), Marty Earle (lead guitar), Bruce Watson aka Bruce Wayne (bass guitar), and Bob Wian (keyboards) to attempt to fulfill their aspirations. October Country began performing at some dances and parties before finding moderate success on the Los Angeles club scene as a supporting act to the Coasters and the Rivingtons.

In 1967, filmmaker Denis Hoffman approached October Country with the idea of filming the group as they perform and live their daily lives. Serving as a demo video to record labels, an article on Dangerous Minds states that "Watching the band grappling with the concepts of hippie culture, lightshows and psychedelia while going about their basically boring lifestyles is quite amusing. They’re proud to be squares, which considering the era was probably not a great marketing concept". Nonetheless, the film succeeded in convincing company president Len Leny to sign October Country to Epic Records late in 1967. The band was teamed with musician and aspiring record producer Michael Lloyd, who had departed the psychedelic rock band the West Coast Pop Art Experimental Band earlier in the same year to work on side-projects such as the Rubber Band and California Spectrum.

The group entered Columbia Records Studios to record their debut single, "October Country", a Lloyd-penned composition. Lloyd recalled his first time in the studio with the group: "It was an 8-track and one of those union places where you couldn't touch a thing." The first recording was their single "October Country" and on the B side, "Baby What I Mean." The title track, penned by Michael Lloyd, was named after the 1955 dark fantasy story collection The October Country by Ray Bradbury. In 1968, the band immediately followed the release with the sophomore effort "My Girlfriend Is a Witch", from the album, receiving substantial radio play in Los Angeles. The song would later be done by Lloyd in The Cattanooga Cats, an animated series from Hanna-Barbera, appearing on the self-titled album from the band, on the Forward Records label. Epic Records decided to finance October Country's self-titled album, which Lloyd composed all eleven songs for, and, for the most part, arranged all the instrumentals. Music critic Bryan Thomas noted the album's influences stemmed from the orchestration found on Sgt. Pepper's Lonely Hearts Club Band, and praised how Lloyd "always seemed to find interesting ways to incorporate various sophisticated instrumentation".

October Country released one final single, "Cowboys and Indians", before disbanding later in 1968. Although commercial success eluded the band, it showcased Lloyd's potential as a producer, awarding him an opportunity to record with a studio group called the Smoke. The band released an album in 1968, featuring a cover version of "October Country". He later achieved wider acclaim for his work in the music industry. October Country's recordings have been placed on compilation albums over the years; however, their most prominent appearance is on Where the Action Is! Los Angeles Nuggets: 1965-1968, which features "My Girlfriend Is a Witch".
