= Smell of Incense =

Single by The West Coast Pop Art Experimental Band

from the album Vol. 2 (Breaking Through)
- B-side: "Unfree Child"
- Released: 1968
- Recorded: 1967
- Genre: Psychedelic rock
- Length: 2:23 (single version); 5:43 (album version)
- Label: Reprise
- Songwriters: Ron Morgan, Bob Markley
- Producers: Bob Markley, Jimmy Bowen

The West Coast Pop Art Experimental Band singles chronology
"Suppose They Gave a War and No One Comes" (1967)	"Smell of Incense" (1968)	"Free as a Bird" (1969)

"Smell of Incense" is a song by the American psychedelic rock band the West Coast Pop Art Experimental Band, written by Ron Morgan and Bob Markley, and was released as a single on Reprise Records in 1968.

== Background ==
An extended version of the song appeared on the group's third album, Vol. 2 (Breaking Through), which was distributed prior to the single. It is considered one of the pinnacles of the band's music catalogue, with it marked by Shaun and Danny Harris's breathy vocal harmonies, and the instrumental interplay between Morgan's distorted guitar-playing coinciding with Shaun Harris's heavy bass sound. Despite the heady atmosphere, the group insists the recording, along with their other self-penned material, was not composed under the influence of LSD. "Smell of Incense", like all of the band's releases, was commercially unsuccessful and failed to chart. The song was later reissued on Hallucinations: Psychedelic Pop Nuggets from the WEA Vaults in 2004.

== Southwest F.O.B. recording ==
In 1968, the West Coast Pop Art Experimental Band was performing at a teen dance club in Dallas called LouAnns with the composition in their set list. A local psychedelic group, Southwest F.O.B. was opening for the band, and was so impressed by the song that they were motivated to record it themselves. Their version was conducted in a similar musical style to its predecessor, but was considerably shorter in comparison to the original album version, with a run-time of two minutes and 40 seconds. Their version peaked at number 56 on the Hot 100. The group's version was also included on Southwest F.O.B.'s only album, Smell of Incense. However, the cover art sparked some controversy for its depiction of four nude women, resulting in many record stores refusing to stock the album.

== Chart performance ==
=== Southwest F.O.B. ===
Chart (1968)	Peak position
U.S. Billboard Hot 100	56
