= Amos Records =

American independent record label

Amos Records was an independent record label established in Los Angeles, California by Jimmy Bowen, in 1968. The label was located on 6565 Sunset Boulevard, and had an additional office branch in New York City. With Bowen producing most of Amos Records' music artists, the label released material from 1968 to 1971, and was best remembered for issuing an album by Longbranch Pennywhistle, which consisted of material from future contributors to The Eagles. Other notable artists included Bing Crosby, Mel Carter, and The West Coast Pop Art Experimental Band. Some of Amos' later releases were distributed by Bell Records.

== Discography ==
=== Albums ===
- Bing Crosby - Hey Jude / Hey Bing! AAS 7001, 1969 (US #162)
- Evergreen Blueshoes - The Ballad of Evergreen Blueshoes AAS 7002, 1969
- Lee Dresser - El Camino Real AAS 7003, 1969
- The West Coast Pop Art Experimental Band - Where's My Daddy? AAS 7004, 1969
- AAS 7005 is skipped in the sequence
- Johnny Tillotson - Tears on My Pillow AAS 7006, 1969
- Longbranch Pennywhistle - Longbranch Pennywhistle AAS 7007, 1969
- Armageddon - Armageddon AAS 7008, 1969
- Frankie Laine - Frankie Laine's Greatest Hits AAS 7009, 1970
- Mel Carter - This Is My Life AAS 7010, 1971
- Michael Seven - Michael Seven AAS 7011, 1971
- Believers - A Salute to Motown AAS 7012, 1971
- Frankie Laine - A Brand New Day AAS 7013, 1971
- Wilburn Burchette - Occult Concert AAS 7014, 1971
- Shiloh - Shiloh AAS 7015, 1971
- Kim Carnes - Rest on Me AAS 7016, 1971

=== Soundtrack albums ===
- Beneath the Planet of the Apes AAS 8001, 1970
- Vanishing Point AAS 8002, 1971

=== Singles ===
- Bing Crosby - "Lonely Street" b/w "Hey Jude" AAS 111, 1969
- Jerry Fisher and Timepiece - "City Ways" b/w "Slow It Down a Little While" AAS 112, 1969
- The Great Awakening - "Amazing Grace" (Long) b/w "Amazing Grace" (Short) AAS 113, 1969
- Steve Colt Paradox - "If You Gotta Make a Fool of Somebody" b/w "Mr. Pitiful" AAS 114, 1969
- The Evergreen Blueshoes - "Johnny B. Goode" b/w "Walking Down the Line" AAS 115, 1969
- Bing Crosby - "It's All In the Game" b/w "More and More" AAS 116, 1969
- Johnny Tillotson - "Tears on My Pillow" b/w "Remember When" AAS 117, 1969
- Lee Dresser - "Abraham, Martin and John" b/w "Camino Real" AAS 118, 1969
- The West Coast Pop Art Experimental Band - "Free as a Bird" b/w "Where's My Daddy?" AAS 119, 1969
- Mel Carter - "Everything Stops for a Little While" b/w "San Francisco Is a Lonesome Town" AAS 120, 1969
- Longbranch Pennywhistle - "Don't Talk Now" b/w "Jubilee Anne" AAS 121, 1969
- Ebony Jam - "Ride On" (Vocal) b/w "Ride On" (Instrumental) AAS 122, 1969
- Erik - "Chelsea Butterfly" b/w "Midnight Rider" AAS 123, 1969
- Dove - "Baby You Came Rollin' Cross My Mind" b/w "I Can Make It with You" AAS 124, 1969
- Johnny Tillotson - "What Am I Living For?" b/w "Joy to the World" AAS 125, 1969
- Casey Anderson - "Monsoon Season Hungries" b/w "I'll Be Your Baby Tonight" AAS 126, 1969
- Frankie Avalon - "The Star" b/w "Woman Cryin'" AAS 127, 1969
- Johnny Tillotson - "Raining in My Heart" b/w "Today I Started Loving You Again" AAS 128, 1969
- Longbranch Pennywhistle - "Lucky Love" b/w "Rebecca" AAS 129, 1969
- Headstrong - "Ode to a Heffalump" b/w ? AAS 130, 1969
- The Hondells - "Follow the Bouncing Ball" b/w "The Legend of Frankie and Johnny" AAS 131, 1969
- Mel Carter - "Everything Stops for a Little While" b/w "This Is My Life" AAS 132, 1970
- Lola Falana - "Stand By Your Man" b/w "He's Chosen Me" AAS 133, 1970
- The Standards - "When You Wish Upon a Star" (Vocal) b/w "When You Wish Upon a Star" (Instrumental) AAS 134, 1970
- George Mc Cannon III - "I Fall to Pieces" b/w "Birds of All Nations" AAS 135, 1970
- Johnny Tillotson - "Susan" b/w "Love Waits for Me" AAS 136, 1970
- Casey Anderson - "Sunday Joe" b/w ? AAS 137, 1970
- Frankie Laine - "I Believe" b/w "On the Sunny Side of the Street" AAS 138, 1970
- Mel Carter - "Kiss Tomorrow Goodbye" b/w "This Is My Life" AAS 139, 1970
- Shiloh - "Jennifer" b/w "Tell Her to Get Out of Your Life" AAS 140, 1970
- Little Helen - "About Me Boy" b/w "More and More" AAS 141, 1970
- Don and Debbi - "I Can Be Happy" b/w "Shut Out" AAS 142, 1970
- AAS 143 is skipped in the sequence
- Oxen Free and the Buffalo Hunters - "Gimme, Gimme, Gimme Your Love" b/w "Give Me Your Money" AAS 144, 1970
- Leonard Rosenman - "March of the Apes" b/w ? AAS 145, 1970
- Johnny Tillotson - "I Don't Believe in If Anymore" b/w "Kansas City, Kansas" AAS 146, 1970
- Manuela - "If I Give My Heart to You" b/w "It Takes a Lot of Tenderness" AAS 147, 1970
- Longbranch Pennywhistle - "Star Spangled Bus" b/w "Bring Back Funky Women" AAS 148, 1970
- John Bahler - "Into the Sun" b/w "Tear Down the Wall" AAS 149, 1970
- The Hondells - "Shine on Ruby Mountain" b/w "The Legend of Frankie and Johnny" AAS 150, 1970
- George Mc Cannon III - "No Love at All" b/w "Tall Oak Tree" AAS 151, 1970
- Pat Shannon - "I Ain't Got Time Anymore" b/w "I Ain't Got Time Anymore" (alternate version) AAS 152, 1970
- Frankie Laine - "Put Your Hand in the Hand" b/w "Going To Newport" AJS 153, 1970
- Frankie Laine - "My God And I" b/w "Don't Blame The Child" AJS 161, 1971
