= Amblin' =

1968 film by Steven Spielberg

- Promotional release poster
- Directed by: Steven Spielberg
- Written by: Steven Spielberg
- Produced by: Denis C. Hoffman
- Starring: Richard Levin; Pamela McMyler
- Cinematography: Allen Daviau
- Edited by: Steven Spielberg (uncredited)
- Music by: Michael Lloyd
- Distributed by: Sigma III Corp.
- Release date: December 18, 1968
- Running time: 26 minutes
- Country: United States
- Budget: $15,000

Amblin' is a 1968 American short film written and directed by Steven Spielberg. It was Spielberg's first completed film shot on 35 mm. The film is a short love story set during the hippie era of the late 1960s about a young man and woman who meet in the desert, attempt to hitchhike, become friends, then lovers, make their way to a beach, and part ways. It later became the namesake for Spielberg's production company, Amblin Entertainment.

== Plot ==
A young man carrying a closely guarded guitar case meets a free-spirited young woman while hitchhiking across the Mojave Desert, she befriends him, then he hauls both of their luggage, they play an olive pit spitting game, she shares a cannabis joint, they become lovers, and they accept various rides, en route to a Pacific coast beach. At the beach the man runs, fully clothed, into the surf, and splashes about, while the woman with daisies in her hair, hesitatingly opens his guitar case and lays out its contents: a tie, wingtip shoes, Thrifty Drugs mouthwash, a paperback of Arthur C. Clarke's The City and the Stars, a white shirt, Right Guard spray deodorant, a suit, a roll of toilet paper, white crew socks, Phillips' Milk of Magnesia, and toothpaste. The woman smiles in bemusement, perhaps sensing that her companion was not the free-spirit that she assumed he was. She frowns in sad disappointment and climbs back up the beach stairs without him.

There is no spoken dialogue in the film aside from the lyrics to the opening and closing theme song. There is an ambient soundtrack featuring bird sounds, wind, passing car noises, popping noises made by the characters, fire sounds, and laughter, along with instrumental music.

== Production ==
=== Casting ===
Spielberg found his lead actor Richard Levin working as a librarian in the Beverly Hills Public Library. For the mysterious redhead in the film, Spielberg discovered Pamela McMyler from the Academy Players directory. She had previously been a member of the Pasadena Playhouse and had a small role in The Boston Strangler and Adam-12 as "Sally" (Season 1 episode 20).

=== Steven Spielberg as writer and director ===
Amblin' became a reality after Spielberg was introduced to aspiring producer Denis C. Hoffman. The movie had a $15,000 budget. In 1968, his friend Hoffman provided financing of approximately $10,000. At the time, Hoffman had no experience in producing, writing or developing motion picture projects. At Hoffman's request, the music of October Country, a band he was managing at the time, was used for the film.

In exchange for the financing provided by Hoffman, Hoffman exacted from Spielberg the young filmmaker's agreement to (a) direct Amblin' for no compensation whatsoever and (b) be bound for ten years to direct any script selected by Hoffman if such a script was brought to Spielberg by Hoffman. For this second film, Spielberg was to receive the payment of $25,000 plus 5% of the profits after expenses (the so-called "1968 Amblin Contract").

No second film for Hoffman was ever made. Spielberg bought out the contract in 1977 for $30,000, but Hoffman claimed the buyout was invalid and sued Spielberg in 1995 for $33 million. The matter was settled out of court.

=== Shooting ===
Amblin' started shooting on July 6, 1968, at Denis Hoffman's Cinefx soundstage. The filming commenced with a complicated tracking shot following a trail of matches leading to a bonfire shot in the studio in order that cinematographer Allen Daviau could control the lighting. After Cinefx and the filming of the final sequence outside Jack Palance's beach house in Malibu, the crew moved on to various desert locations around Pearblossom, California, for the remaining eight days of filming. On rough terrain and under a punishing 105-degree sun, many of Spielberg's unpaid crew left before the shoot was completed. Spielberg confessed to one crew member that he had vomited every day before he went to the set.

=== Production notes ===
- Anne Spielberg (Steven's sister) who wrote Big also worked with him on this first effort which started his career and won him his contract at Universal.
- The film was released on director Steven Spielberg's 22nd birthday: December 18, 1968.
- Jerry Lewis taught a film directing class at the University of Southern California in Los Angeles for a number of years; his students included Spielberg. In 1968, he screened Amblin' and told his students, "That's what filmmaking is all about." In his 1971 book, The Total Film-Maker, Lewis says, "[The film] rocked me back. [Spielberg] displayed an amazing knowledge of film-making as well as creative talent."

== Release and impact ==
Opening on December 18, 1968, at Loews Crest Theater in Los Angeles, Amblin' shared a double bill with Otto Preminger's Skidoo. Amblin' won several film festival awards including a showing at the Atlanta Film Festival in 1968 (winning the Silver Phoenix Jury prize making it Spielberg's first award for filmmaking).

This movie, only 26 minutes long, led to Spielberg becoming the youngest director ever to be signed to a long-term deal with a major Hollywood studio (Universal) after Sid Sheinberg, then the vice-president of production for Universal Television saw the film. Spielberg was signed to a 7-year contract with Universal Television.

== See also ==
- List of American films of 1968
