= Mad About You (Belinda Carlisle song) =

Single by Belinda Carlisle

from the album Belinda
- B-side: "I Never Wanted a Rich Man"
- Released: May 5, 1986
- Length: 3:30
- Label: I.R.S.
- Songwriters: Paula Jean Brown; James Whelan; Mitchel Young Evans
- Producer: Michael Lloyd

Belinda Carlisle singles chronology
"Mad About You" (1986)	"I Feel the Magic" (1986)

"Mad About You" is a song by American singer Belinda Carlisle. It was written by Paula Jean Brown, James Whelan and Mitchel Young Evans, and produced by Michael Lloyd for Carlisle's debut solo album, Belinda. The song was released in 1986 as Carlisle's debut solo single after leaving the Go-Go's. The song peaked at number three on the U.S. Billboard Hot 100 chart and at number one on Canada's RPM 100 Singles chart. The song was later included in the jukebox musical Head over Heels that used the Go-Go's music in addition to two of Carlisle's solo tracks. The musical debuted on Broadway in 2018.

== Background and composition ==
Paula Jean Brown, who joined the Go-Go's as bass guitarist following Jane Wiedlin's departure, co-wrote the song with Jim Whelan, and Wiedlin and Charlotte Caffey sang back-up vocals. "Mad About You" was one of a few songs being considered for the fourth (unrecorded) Go-Go's album. The Go-Go's split, and "Mad About You" and two other songs co-written by Paula Jean Brown ended up on Belinda. The song is written in the key of A major in common time with a tempo of 144 beats per minute.

== Music video ==
The music video was directed by Leslie Libman. It features Andy Taylor of Duran Duran and Carlisle's husband, Morgan Mason. During one scene she dances to a vinyl LP of Yma Sumac's Mambo!. The outdoor scenes are largely set in or near Palisades Park in Santa Monica, California.

== Track listings ==
The single's B-side, "I Never Wanted a Rich Man", was also included on Carlisle's first long playing work. The extended version of "Mad About You", originally on the A-side of the 12-inch single, was then included on the album compact disc re-release by Virgin in 2003.

7-inch single

1. "Mad About You" (single mix) – 3:30
2. "I Never Wanted a Rich Man" – 4:12

12-inch single

1. "Mad About You" (extended mix) – 5:03
2. "Mad About You" (single mix) – 3:30
3. "Mad About You" (instrumental mix) – 3:30

== Charts ==
=== Weekly charts ===
Weekly chart performance for "Mad About You"
Chart (1986)	Peak position
Australia (Kent Music Report)	9
Canada Top Singles (RPM)	1
Ireland (IRMA)	28
Israel (Israeli Singles Chart)	16
Italy (Musica e dischi)	19
New Zealand (Recorded Music NZ)	23
Quebec (ADISQ)	8
UK Singles (Official Charts)	67
US Billboard Hot 100	3
US Adult Contemporary (Billboard)	25
US Dance Club Songs (Billboard)	21
US Cash Box Top 100 Singles	4

=== Year-end charts ===
Year-end chart performance for "Mad About You"
Chart (1986)	Position
Australia (Kent Music Report)	46
Canada Top Singles (RPM)	29
US Billboard Hot 100	36
US Cash Box Top 100 Singles	54

== Certifications ==
Certifications for "Mad About You"
Region	Certification	Certified units/sales
Canada (Music Canada)	Gold	50,000^{^}
^{^} Shipments figures based on certification alone.

== See also ==
- List of RPM number-one singles of 1986
- 13 Going on 30 soundtrack
