= Help, I'm a Rock =

Single by The Mothers of Invention

from the album Freak Out!
- A-side: "How Could I Be Such a Fool"
- Released: 1966
- Recorded: March 12, 1966
- Studio: TTG Studios, Hollywood, California
- Genre: Experimental rock; musique concrète
- Length: 3:12 (single version); 8:37 (album version)
- Label: Verve
- Songwriter: Frank Zappa
- Producer: Tom Wilson

The Mothers of Invention singles chronology
"How Could I Be Such a Fool" / "Help I'm a Rock" (1966)	"Trouble Every Day" (1966)

"Help, I'm a Rock" is a song written by American musician Frank Zappa. It was recorded by Zappa along with the rock band the Mothers of Invention on the group's debut album Freak Out!, which was released on Verve Records on June 27, 1966.

== Background ==
Tom Wilson signed the Mothers of Invention to MGM Records on the assumption they were a traditional blues-rock ensemble, after hearing part of a live performance by the band that was relatively conventional songs influenced by blues or R&B. However, Wilson was unaware of the group's more experimental qualities until they entered TTG Studios.

As a testament to the song's absurdity, Zappa explained "Help, I'm a Rock" was created spontaneously as "just a thing that spewed out. What was happening was what was in the air that night". The song begins with a steady drum beat and guitar riff not far removed from rock and roll of the era. Other instruments are gradually introduced, including piano and bass guitar. The lyrics initially consist of the repeated phrase "Help, I'm a rock" before evolving into overlapping chatter from the band's members, screams, duck calls, tribal chants, and erotic moans that simulated a female orgasm. Drummer Jimmy Carl Black later commented the song's droning, repetitive quality was partly inspired by raga music.

In the liner notes to Freak Out!, Zappa wrote the tongue-in-cheek statement: "'Help, I'm a Rock' is dedicated to Elvis Presley. Note the interesting formal structure and the stunning four-part harmony toward the end". He concludes his comments on the song by jokingly remarking about "the obvious lack of commercial potential. Ho hum".

"Help, I'm a Rock" is a three part suite consisting of: "Okay to Tap Dance", "In Memoriam Edgar Varese" and "It Can't Happen Here". In the first pressing of Freak Out!, the song was credited simply as "Help, I'm a Rock". However, as Freak Out! reissues and compilation albums were made available, the third part, "It Can't Happen Here", has been commonly listed as a separate track. In concert, the composition was typically mixed with other band songs, most regularly "Hungry Freaks Daddy". One music critic notes "Long term, the psychedelic workout had plenty of commercial appeal, with Zappa’s bands playing it throughout the master’s career. 'Help, I’m a Rock' became one of the many catch phrases attached to Zappa over his career".

A section of "Help, I'm a Rock" called "Third Movement: It Can't Happen Here" was also featured as the B-side of the DJ-only "How Can I Be Such a Fool?" single. With a running time of nearly nine minutes, "Help, I'm a Rock" remains one of the Mothers of Invention's most lengthy and experimental pieces in their catalogue.

In 1967, psychedelic rock group the West Coast Pop Art Experimental Band recorded the song on their second album Part One. Richie Unterberger described the rendition as a concept that "flung them into freakier pastures", with its style being "emulated convincingly on the group original '1906', an apt soundtrack to a bummer acid trip with its constant spoken refrain, 'I don't feel well'".
