= Pony Pony Run Run =

French power pop band

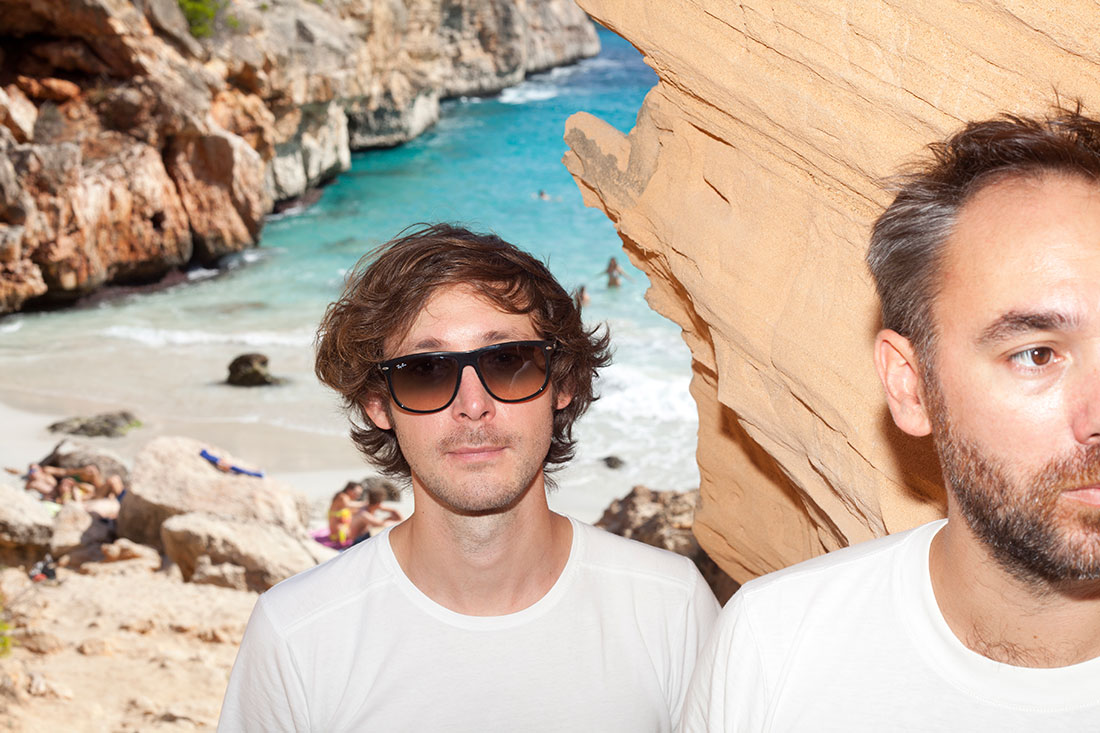
- Gaëtan and Amaël in 2016.

Background information
- Origin: Angers, France
- Genres: Power pop, synthpop, dance-punk
- Years active: 2003–present
- Labels: 3ème Bureau
- Members: Gaëtan Réchin Lê Ky-Huong (guitar/vocals); Amaël Réchin Lê Ky-Huong (bass); Antonin Pierre (keyboards)
- Past members: Samuel Cortes (2003–2008); Frédéric Rivière (2003–2009)
- Website: ponyponyrunrun.net

Pony Pony Run Run are a French power pop band from Angers formed in Nantes in 2003. The band line-up consists of three members named simply "G" (Gaëtan Réchin Lê Ky-Huong, guitar/vocals), "A" (Amaël Réchin Lê Ky-Huong, bass) and "T" (Antonin Pierre, keyboards). Two original members of the group have left the band; "S" (Samuel Cortes, guitar/backing vocals) who left the band in 2008, and "F" (Frédéric Rivière, drums) who departed in 2009.

To date, the group have released one studio album and two singles. Their début album, You Need Pony Pony Run Run was released on 8 June 2009 and entered the French albums chart at #104, reaching a peak position of #78 on 12 September 2009. The first song to be taken from the album, "Hey You" was released in September of the same year and reached #8 in Belgium, as well as achieving a position of #19 in the French singles chart.

== Discography ==
=== Albums ===
Year	Album	Charts			Certification
Year	Album	BEL Wa	FR	SWI	Certification
2009	You Need Pony Pony Run Run	26	17	—	
2012	Pony Pony Run Run	—	34	—	
2016	Voyage Voyage	—	—	—	

=== Singles ===
Year	Single	Charts		Certification	Album
Year	Single	BEL Wa	FR	Certification	Album
2009	"Hey You"	8	19		
2010	"Walking on a Line"				
