= Heya (J.J. Light song) =

Single by J.J. Light

from the album Heya
- B-side: "On the Road Now"
- Released: 1969
- Genre: Rocksteady
- Label: Liberty
- Producer(s): Bob Markley

"Heya" was a 1969 international hit song by J.J. Light, stage name for Navajo singer Jim Stallings, who played bass on several Sir Douglas Quintet albums. "Heya", with B-side "On the Road Now", was released in Germany as Liberty catalog number 56111. Stallings studio band included Larry Knechtel on keyboards, guitarists Gary Rowles and Ron Morgan, and drummers Earl Palmer and Jim Gordon. The song begins with a Native American-like chant and reflects Stallings' ancestry.

== Covers ==
The song has been covered by Jeronimo (1969), Adriano Celentano (1970), The Primevals (1987), Krokus (1999), and others.

The song was used on Pato Fu's song "Capetão" on 1996 album Tem Mas Acabou
