= Volume One (The West Coast Pop Art Experimental Band album) =

Studio album by The West Coast Pop Art Experimental Band
- Released: 6 June 1966
- Recorded: 1965–1966
- Genre: Psychedelic rock, folk rock, blues rock
- Length: 28:03
- Label: FiFo (original); Sundazed (rerelease)
- Producer: Bob Irwin

The West Coast Pop Art Experimental Band chronology
Volume One (1966)	Part One (1967)

Professional ratings
Review scores
Source	Rating
AllMusic	3/5 stars
Uncut	3/5 stars

Volume One is the first album recorded by the psychedelic rock band the West Coast Pop Art Experimental Band. It was first released in 1966 on the small FiFo Records label. It was reissued in both compact disc and vinyl in 1997 by Sundazed. The album features covers of pop classics such as Richard Berry's "Louie, Louie" and the Kinks' "You Really Got Me". The songs mellow out into a blues/folk style with covers of Bob Dylan songs.

Most of the material was completed before Bob Markley was included in band activities. Still, Markley's presence was evident on tracks like "Don't Break My Balloon" and "If You Want This Love", in which he contributed vocals to the songs.

== Track listing ==
=== Original 1966 track listing ===
1. "Something You Got" (Chris Kenner) - 2:53
2. "Work Song" (Oscar Brown, Nat Adderley) - 2:11
3. "Louie, Louie" (Richard Berry) - 2:46
4. "Don't Break My Balloon" (Bob Markley) - 3:12
5. "You Really Got Me" (Ray Davies) - 3:05
6. "Don't Let Anything!!! Stand in Your Way" (Markley, Kim Fowley) - 2:12
7. "I Won't Hurt You" (Michael Lloyd, Shaun Harris, Markley) - 2:10
8. "If You Want This Love" (Sonny Knight) - 1:33
9. "Insanity" (Markley, Fowley) - 3:06
10. "It's All Over Now, Baby Blue" (Bob Dylan) - 3:02
11. "She Belongs to Me" (Dylan) - 1:53

Bonus Tracks contained on 1997 reissue

12. "She Surely Must Know" (Lloyd, Shaun Harris) - 1:57
13. "Sassafras" (Billy Edd Wheeler) - 1:59
14. "She May Call You Up Tonight" (Michael Brown, Steve Martin) - 2:25
15. "One Day" (Lloyd) - 2:01
16. "Funny How Love Can Be" (John Carter, Ken Harper) - 1:38
17. "Obviously Bad" (Lloyd, Shaun Harris) - 1:30
18. "Endless Night" (Shaun Harris) - 2:15
19. "Tell Me What You Want to Know" (Lloyd) - 1:46
20. "Just You and Me" (Lloyd) - 1:54
21. "Chimes of Freedom" (Dylan) - 3:03
22. "Scuse Me Miss Rose" (Bob Johnston) - 2:37

== Single ==
- "Sassafras" b/w "I Won't Hurt You"

== Personnel ==
- Bob Markley - backing vocals
- Shaun Harris - bass guitar, vocals
- Danny Harris - guitar, vocals
- Michael Lloyd - guitar, vocals

== In popular culture ==
- "I Won't Hurt You" was featured, in its original form, in Day One of the 2020 Amazon original series, The Wilds (TV series).
- "I Won't Hurt You" was also featured in Wes Anderson's 2018 animated film Isle of Dogs.
- "I Won't Hurt You" was covered by Episode Six under their pseudonym "Neo Maya"
