= Tears on My Pillow (album) =

Studio album by Johnny Tillotson
- Released: 1969
- Genre: Pop
- Label: Amos
- Producer: Jimmy Bowen

Johnny Tillotson chronology
Here I Am (1967)	Tears on My Pillow (1969)	Johnny Tillotson (1972)

Professional ratings
Review scores
Source	Rating
The Encyclopedia of Popular Music	3/5 stars

Tears on My Pillow was Johnny Tillotson's first album in two years, released by Amos Records. The arrangements were by Clark Gassman, Ernie Freeman and Glen D. Hardin.

The title track, a cover version of Little Anthony and the Imperials' 1958 doo-wop hit, was released as a single the same year of the album's release; neither the single nor the album charted. The album is mainly a collection of covers, including versions of Merle Haggard's "Today I Started Loving You Again," Carole King & Gerry Goffin's "Hey Girl," Roy Orbison's "Only the Lonely (Know the Way I Feel)," and Buddy Holly's "Raining in My Heart."

== Track listing ==
=== Side 1 ===
1. "My Girl" (Ronald White, William Robinson, Jr.)
2. "Joy to the World" (Dave Burgess, Dick Monda)
3. "Hey Girl" (Gerry Goffin, Carole King)
4. "Only the Lonely (Know the Way I Feel)" (Roy Orbison, Joe Melson)
5. "Tears on My Pillow" (Al Lewis, Sylvester Bradford)

=== Side 2 ===
1. "We've Got Ourselves Together" (Bonnie Bramlett, Carl Radle)
2. "Raining in My Heart" (Boudleaux & Felice Bryant)
3. "What Am I Living For" (Art Harris, Fred Jay)
4. "Remember When" (Mac Davis)
5. "Today I Started Loving You Again" (Bonnie Owens, Merle Haggard)
