= LIFO =

LIFO may refer to:

== Last In First Out ==
- FIFO and LIFO accounting
- Stack (abstract data type), in computing, a collection data structure providing LIFO semantics; also called a LIFO queue
- LIFO (education), a layoff policy

== Magazines ==
- LiFO, a Greek weekly freesheet

== See also ==
- FIFO (disambiguation)
