= Stock rotation =

Method to avoid stock loss

Stock rotation is a practice intended to avoid the degradation or wastage of stock. The practice is typical in supermarkets and food environments. It involves moving the products with the earliest expiry date, sell-by date or display date to the front of a shelf, so that those items get picked up and sold or otherwise used first. Accordingly, the items with the latest expiry date are moved to the back of the shelf or storage area, so that they are sold or used last. In the case of food, the process may be called first-in first-out (FIFO).

The practice reduces the amount of wastage caused by items expiring or degrading before they are used. In the case of food, the practice is important for preventing foodborne illness, as well as preserving the appearance of items so that they are sold. Often, food cannot be legally sold or even donated after its sell-by or expiry date. Therefore stock rotation reduces the amount spent on wasted product. For medication, it may reduce the prominence of medication administration errors, or breaches of sterility due to items being used past their guaranteed sterility date.

The practice of stock rotation takes many forms, such as First-Expired First-Out (FEFO) or Last In First Out (LIFO).

== Description ==
Most, if not all, packaged products, will have either a sell by date on them or a display until date; in practice, these are exactly the same thing. After this date, it is either illegal for the store to sell them (this is the case in Ireland) or the quality will have deteriorated to the point at which nobody will buy them. In either case, they cannot be sold.

If a product is still on shelves after its sell by date, it will have to be thrown away, which is both costly and wasteful to the store (suppliers must be paid even if stock is not sold). Therefore, it is imperative that sell by dates are strictly adhered to, and that products which will perish earlier be sold as quickly as possible.

Shoppers, on the most part, will simply walk up to a shelf and take the front most box of the product they are looking for; this is especially true if they are in a hurry. They will generally also, unless they are specifically looking for a product that will last longer, not pay much attention to sell by/use by dates. If products with an early sell by date are at the front, and later ones at the back, they will be sold first. If things are organized the other way round, or stock is improperly rotated, newer stock will be sold first, leaving out of date stock sitting on the shelves which will have to be thrown away.

Rotation also applies to loose products; in this case, there is usually no set sell by date, and produce must merely look fit to eat. Older stock is merely placed on top of newer stock to rotate it.

== Problems ==
Some customers are fully aware of the practice of rotation, and will reach towards the back of the shelf in order to get newer (and therefore slightly better) produce. Also, when applied to large amounts of produce, rotation can be difficult if not impossible. It only takes one careless worker to disrupt rotation and create problems.

== Other methods of stock loss mitigation ==
If a stock is nearing its sell by date, stock may be reduced; its price is lowered in order to be more appealing to customers. Reduced stock is usually included in the rotation of stock, and is therefore moved to the front of the shelf ahead of any unreduced stock.

== See also ==
- Inventory turnover rate
