= What Am I Living For =

Single by Chuck Willis
- B-side: "Hang Up My Rock and Roll Shoes"
- Released: March 1958
- Genre: R&B
- Length: 2:24
- Label: Atlantic
- Songwriter(s): Fred Jay, Art Harris

Chuck Willis singles chronology
"Betty and Dupree" (1957)	"What Am I Living For" (1958)	"Thunder and Lightning" (1958)

"What Am I Living For" is a song written by Fred Jay and Art Harris and performed by Chuck Willis featuring the Reggie Obrecht Orchestra and Chorus. It reached No. 1 on the U.S. R&B chart and #9 on the U.S. pop chart in 1958.

Chuck Willis’s version was the first rock and roll record released in stereo, "engineered by Tom Dowd of Atlantic Records".

== Other charting versions ==
- Ernest Tubb released a version of the song which reached No. 19 on the U.S. country chart in 1959.
- Conway Twitty released a version of the song which reached No. 26 on the U.S. pop chart in 1960.
- Percy Sledge released a version of the song which reached No. 91 on the U.S. pop chart in 1967.
- Twitty re-released a version of the song which reached No. 59 on the U.S. country chart in 1971.
- Ray Charles released a version of the song which reached No. 20 on the U.S. adult contemporary chart and #54 on the U.S. pop chart in 1971.

== Other versions ==
- Jack Scott released a version of the song as a single in 1960, but it did not chart.
- Ernie Freeman released a version of the song as a single in 1962, but it did not chart.
- Carl McVoy released a version of the song as a single in 1962, but it did not chart.
- Kitty Wells featuring The Jordanaires released a version of the song on her 1962 album Queen of Country Music.
- Billy Fury released a version of the song on his 1963 album Am I Blue. It was produced by Dick Rowe.
- Wanda Jackson released a version of the song on her 1963 album Love Me Forever. It was produced by Ken Nelson.
- Millie Small released a version of the song as the B-side to her 1964 single "Sweet William".
- The Everly Brothers released a version of the song on their 1965 album Beat & Soul. It was produced by Dick Glasser.
- The Animals released a version of the song on their 1966 album Animalisms. It was produced by Tom Wilson.
- Filipino singer Eddie Peregrina released a version of the song in 1966, later released on his 1968 album of the same name. In 1977, he later recorded a Filipino version of the song titled "Nabubuhay Ako, Dahil Sa Iyo" on his 1977 compilation album, Hanggang Sa Dulo ng Walang Hanggan, released posthumously. Almost four decades later, singer April Boy Regino sang a Filipino version of the song titled "Paano ang Puso Ko?" as theme of the 1997 film of the same name.
- Rodger Collins released a version of the song as the B-side to his 1967 single "Hands Off My Girl".
- Danny and The Velaires released a version of the song as a single in 1967, but it did not chart.
- Z. Z. Hill released a version of the song on his 1967 album A Whole Lot of Soul.
- Archie Campbell and Lorene Mann released a version of the song on their 1968 album Archie and Lorene Tell It Like It Is. It was produced by Bob Ferguson.
- Solomon Burke released a version of the song as the B-side to his 1969 single "Proud Mary".
- Wilbert Harrison released a version of the song on his 1969 album Let's Work Together. It was produced by Juggy Murray.
- Johnny Tillotson released a version of the song on his 1969 album Tears on My Pillow. It was produced by Jimmy Bowen.
- Andy Williams released a version of the song as the B-side to his 1969 single "A Woman's Way". It was produced by Dick Glasser.
- Bill Phillips released a version of the song on his 1970 album Little Boy Sad. It was produced by Owen Bradley.
- Lon Satton released a version of the song as the B-side to his 1970 single "Someone Is Standing Outside".
- Jimmy Capps released a version of the song as the B-side to his 1972 single "Free Wheelin'".
- Sonny James released a version of the song as the B-side to his 1973 single "Surprise, Surprise".
- Little Joe Y La Familia Inc. released a version of the song as the B-side to their 1975 single "Paso Del Norte".
- Clarence "Gatemouth" Brown released a version of the song on his 1989 album Standing My Ground.
- Carl Perkins released a version of the song on his 1993 album This Old House.
- Taj Mahal released a version of the song on his 1996 album Phantom Blues. It was produced by John Porter.
- Alan Price and The Electric Blues Company released a version of the song on their 1996 album A Gigster's Life for Me.
- Jimmy Clanton released a version of the song on his 1997 compilation album Go, Jimmy, Go!: The Very Best of Jimmy Clanton.
- The Band released a version of the song on their 2001 re-release of the album Moondog Matinee.
- Julie Hanify, David Mahler, and Larry Polansky released a version of the song on their 2005 album Too Late.
- Van Morrison released a version of the song on his 2006 album Pay the Devil.
- Gene Taylor Blues Band featuring Dave Alvin released a version of the song on their 2008 album Live!!! 605 Boogie!!!
- Dawn McCarthy and Bonnie ‘Prince’ Billy released a version of the song on their 2013 album What the Brothers Sang.
- Pine Leaf Boys released a version of the song on their 2013 album Danser. It was produced by Joel Savoy.
- Doyle Lawson & Quicksilver released a version of the song on their 2017 album Life Is a Story.
