= Ron Stone (music industry executive) =

American personal manager

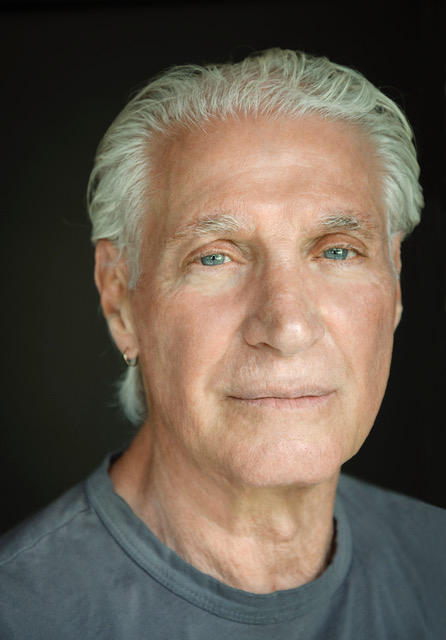
- Ron Stone (photo by Ellen Stone)

Background information
- Genres: Rock, pop
- Occupation: Artist management
- Years active: 1968–present

Ron Stone is an American personal manager who has worked to influence the legislation regarding digital music, file sharing, and musicians' intellectual property distribution rights. He is currently living in Vail, Colorado with his wife.

== Biography ==
=== Early years ===
After growing up in The Bronx, Stone was attending law school in Brooklyn when he decided to move to cross country in 1967 during the Summer of Love. He opened a hippie clothing store in West Hollywood with his wife called "The Great Linoleum Clothing Experiment." Located on the same block of Santa Monica Boulevard as The Troubadour, the store was often frequented by musicians including Janis Joplin and David Crosby, and helped Stone establish some of his earliest relationships inside the music industry.

=== Career ===
In 1968, Ron Stone was persuaded by his childhood friend Elliot Roberts to come onboard his fledgling artist management venture. At the time, Roberts had just signed Joni Mitchell and Neil Young and was sleeping on the couch at Stone's home on Lookout Mountain in Laurel Canyon, Los Angeles, inspiring the name Lookout Management. The company would eventually be joined by David Geffen and become the launching point for one of the most influential management partnerships in the music industry, representing additional talents such as The Eagles, Crosby, Stills, Nash and Young, Bob Dylan, The Band, Devo, America and Tom Cochrane.

Stone went on to form Gold Mountain Entertainment with Danny Goldberg and Burt Stein in 1983. They signed Bonnie Raitt and Belinda Carlisle, and then later with John Silva as a partner, Gold Mountain guided the careers of Nirvana, The Beastie Boys, Beck, Rickie Lee Jones, Foo Fighters, Sonic Youth, Tracy Chapman, Ziggy Marley, The Baha Men, and Joss Stone.

In partnership with Curb Musifilms, Ron Stone Productions produced the feature film "The Harvest." Stone founded and operated World Domination Records in partnership with Dave Allen (Gang of Four and Apple/Beats) for ten years. He also founded and operated Rock-it-comics for five years. Stone has consulted on digital and copyright issues with the RIAA.

In 2018, Stone was inducted into the Personal Managers Hall of Fame by the National Conference of Personal Managers.

==== Napster ====
Stone advocated for artists' intellectual property rights during the rise of peer-to-peer applications like Napster. Commenting on the effect of file sharing on music, Stone stated: "Music for a generation has become disposable and it used to be a collectible." Regarding Napster, he said, "It is the single most insidious website I've ever seen…it's like a burglar's tool."

Stone provided counsel to the Recording Industry Association of America (RIAA) regarding the lawsuit against Napster which was filed on behalf of record labels. Stone reported finding unauthorized copies of songs from artists he represented on Napster. He participated in media campaigns urging people to stop using Napster.
