= You Need Pony Pony Run Run =

Studio album by Pony Pony Run Run
- Released: 8 June 2009 (download); 15 June 2009 (physical)
- Genre: Power pop, synth-pop
- Length: 39:22
- Language: English
- Label: 3ème Bureau

Singles from Pony Pony Run Run
- 1. "Hey You" Released: 7 September 2009; 2. "Walking on a Line" Released: 19 October 2009

You Need Pony Pony Run Run is the first studio album by the Nantes-based power pop band Pony Pony Run Run. It was released on 8 June 2009 as a download, and one week later in compact disc and long play formats. It entered the French albums chart at #104 in its first week after physical release and reached a peak chart position of #78 following the release of the single "Hey You". The second single was "Walking On a Line"

== Track listing ==
All music is composed by Pony Pony Run Run

No.	Title	Length
1.	"Out of Control"	3:32
2.	"Walking on a Line"	3:12
3.	"Hey You"	3:12
4.	"Future of a Nation"	3:15
5.	"Cherry Love Brazil"	3:30
6.	"First Date Mullet"	2:45
7.	"What I Feel"	2:57
8.	"1997 (She Said It's Alright)"	3:42
9.	"Love Veritable"	3:39
10.	"Show Me Show Me"	3:09
11.	"Girl I Know"	3:23
12.	"Hey You (PPRR Dance Remix) [Bonus Track]"	3:06

== Charts ==
=== Weekly ===
Chart (2009–11)	Peak position
Belgian Albums Chart (Wallonia)	26
Belgian Heatseekers Albums Chart (Wallonia)	8
French Albums Chart	17

=== Year-end ===
Chart (2009)	Rank
French Albums Chart	200

Chart (2010)	Rank
French Albums Chart	76
