= St. John Green =

- Origin: Los Angeles, California, U.S.
- Genre: Psychedelic rock
- Years active: 1967–1968
- Label: Flick Disc
- Past members: Mike Baxter; Vic Sabino; Ed Bissot; Bill Kirkland; Shel Scott; Bob Desimone; Brad Delavalley

St. John Green was an American psychedelic rock band who released one self-titled LP, produced by Kim Fowley and Michael Lloyd, in 1968. The album has been described as "by turns frightening, dark, funny and stupid as it reeks of bad trip freak outs in matte black painted rooms with no furniture lit only by a single red bulb and burning cigarette ends.... weirdly dark and epic."

== History ==
In 1967, two students at Pasadena City College, keyboard player Michael 'Papabax' Baxter, and vocalist, Victor 'Vic' Sabino, wanting to create a new entity, began a search for compatible musical comrades. They found bass player and aspiring poet Ed Bissot through an audition, added guitarist Bill Kirkland, a Pasadena, California native, and drummer Shelly Scott, a resident of the San Fernando Valley, just north of Los Angeles, to complete the band line-up. Bissot wanted to perform his own material under the pseudonym "St. John", and, as a compromise, the group name St. John Green was agreed. The band was managed at first by local entrepreneur Harry Snegg, and performed around the Los Angeles area playing songs written either by Bissot, or by Baxter and Sabino together.

Early in 1968 they met record producer and promoter Kim Fowley, who encouraged them to develop what he called the "Canyon Sound", unique to the local Topanga Canyon. The group performed alongside other local bands including Canned Heat and Spirit, and became the house band at the Topanga Canyon Corral.

Interviewed in 2001, Fowley described singer and songwriter Ed Bissot as "tortured", saying:

"In between sets he threw up blood on a cot. He lay on the cot and he puked blood. He had bad lungs and he chain-smoked. Then he would go up on stage and give this performance and the all the groupies were madly in love with him, and then he’d go back to the cot and puke more blood....He was tragic and near death in the band, and as soon as the band stopped he got healthy and stopped smoking, I guess. Ed Bissot. I mean, what a genius. This fucking guy was Jim Morrison and Leon Russell... He had the stage presence of Morrison and a young Leon. The band played as tight as Vanilla Fudge, minus the fucking bubblegum. What a band! And dripping with darkness. Every heroin addict and gun dealer and radical black person from Venice to Malibu and Hollywood would all come to prowl and just worship this guy."

Baxter later said:

"[Kim Fowley] laid out to us what was essentially a plan to create and record a "new style of music"—"The Canyon" sound. We were to be his muse as he wove this "mystical tale about the Dark Shadows of the Canyon and the Mysterious Canyon people who had left the world behind to become one with nature" and all that "jazz"." Fowley did not play a musical instrument. He would collect pieces of music from one recorded source or another to create his musical idea. (Interesting technique)...Then I would sit down and put them together as one to create the musical composition."

The band was signed by Mike Curb of MGM Records to the company's subsidiary label, Flick Disc, and the album was co-produced by Fowley and by Curb's 19-year-old protégé Michael Lloyd, a founder member of the West Coast Pop Art Experimental Band who later became the producer of the Osmonds, Shaun Cassidy, and the Dirty Dancing soundtrack. Baxter said: "I always got the impression from Michael Lloyd that... there was a separate agenda that we were not privy to.... Our music was compromised... and our album twisted into a bizarre Kim Fowley project. In my heart, I knew it was nothing like the album I hoped it would be. We went forward in good faith, but I am sure the other guys felt disappointed as well." Fowley said of the album: "What a record! I have people come up to me and cry and stuff when I go to Europe. They cry and they start shaking and stuff. That’s the way people respond to that record... It’s a great record. There’s only a handful of records that I’ve made that are great."

Shortly after the album was released in 1968, Shel Scott and Bill Kirkland both left the band, and were briefly replaced by Bob Desimone (drums) and Brad Delavalley (guitar). However, musical differences between Bissot, Baxter and Sabino soon led to the band's disintegration and no further recordings were released. Bissot retained the rights to the band name.

The album was reissued on CD by Relics Records in the UK in 2014.

== St. John Green album ==
=== Track listing ===
==== Side one ====
- 7th Generation Mutation (Bissot)
- Canyon Women (Fowley)
- Devil and the Sea (Baxter / Sabino)
- Do You Believe (Bissot)
- Help Me Close the Door (Bissot)
- Messages from the Dead (Bissot)

==== Side two ====
- Goddess of Death (Bissot)
- St. John Green (Fowley)
- Spirit of Now (Baxter / Sabino)
- Love of Hate (Bissot)
- One Room Cemetery (Fowley)
- Shivers of Pleasure (Bissot / Baxter / FowIey)

== Later activities ==
After St. John Green broke up, Baxter and Sabino formed their new band, Jumbo, with Delavalley (later replaced by Jim Pitman of Strawberry Alarm Clock), Richard Pisula (bass), and Neil Olson (drums). The band performed widely in California in 1969, before signing to Lou Adler’s Ode Records. They recorded their one and only album with producer Gary Le Mel. They performed back-up duties for Ode by accompanying vocalist Merry Clayton and John Phillips (of The Mamas and the Papas), two members of Adler's “stable” of artists. The Jumbo album was never released, for reasons unknown, and the band split up in 1971.

Baxter worked as a session musician in Los Angeles and Hawaii in the 1970s and 1980s. He performed with Bonnie Bramlett, Tim Rose, and others. Baxter returned to writing music in the late 1980s and released one CD of originals, Urban Rituals. He started performing again live on select gigs in the Pacific Northwest. In 2022, Baxter and wife retired and relocated to Tulsa, Oklahoma, and has since connected with the local music community and performs on select musical engagements.

Kirkland formed a trio, William Saint James, with Anne Willcocks and Jim Wilson. They released a self-titled album on ABC-Dunhill Records in 1972. Kirkland died in 2010.

Sabino retired from music after Jumbo, creating several successful salon businesses in both California and Arizona.

Scott went on to work with many name musicians throughout the 1970s and '80s, releasing an album with his band, Song, in the early '70s. He is still performing today in venues in and around Southern California.

Bissot has continued to write and create his poetry and music, and headed several musical groups and studio projects both in Los Angeles and Las Vegas.
