= Part One (album) =

Studio album by The West Coast Pop Art Experimental Band
- Released: February 1967
- Genres: Psychedelic rock, experimental rock
- Length: 32:05
- Label: Reprise
- Producers: Bob Markley, Jimmy Bowen

The West Coast Pop Art Experimental Band chronology
Volume One (1966)	Part One (1967)	Vol. 2 (Breaking Through) (1967)

Singles from Part One
- 1. "Shifting Sands" / "1906"; 2. "Help, I'm a Rock" / "Transparent Day"

Professional ratings
Review scores
Source	Rating
AllMusic	4/5 stars

Part One is the second album by the American psychedelic rock group The West Coast Pop Art Experimental Band and was released in February 1967 on Reprise Records. It features compositions by Bob Johnston, Frank Zappa, Baker Knight, P.F. Sloan and Van Dyke Parks. It has a song most well known as "Morning Dew" composed by the Bonnie Dobson with arrangement by Danny Harris. This is the first album with input from guitarist Ron Morgan.

The song "I Won't Hurt You" was later featured in the 2018 stop motion animated film Isle of Dogs.

== Music ==
Bill Pearis of BrooklynVegan said that Part One is "the best example of [the band's] name incarnate, equal parts pop, art and experimentation". The album also contains elements of folk, garage rock and baroque pop. The album has been described as "more song-oriented" than Volume One, and some of the material has drawn comparisons to The Kinks and The Byrds. "It was still plenty weird, almost to the point of stylistic schizophrenia, but when you got down to it, much of the record was comprised of fairly catchy songs in the neighborhood of two and three minutes. [...] There was an undercurrent of unsettling weirdness and even paranoia", according to Richie Unterberger of AllMusic. The track "I Won't Hurt You", contains what are described as "disconnected vocals" and the track "Leiyla" contains a spoken word section "that seems to have been lifted from a vampire B-movie."

== Reception and legacy ==
Richie Unterberger of AllMusic named the album as the strongest of the band's career.

== Track listing ==
No.	Title	Writer(s)	Length
1.	"Shifting Sands"	Baker Knight	3:54
2.	"I Won't Hurt You"	Lloyd, Markley, D. Harris	2:21
3.	"1906"	Markley, Morgan	2:18
4.	"Help, I'm a Rock"	Frank Zappa	4:22
5.	"Will You Walk With Me"	Bonnie Dobson, D. Harris	2:57
6.	"Transparent Day"	Markley, D. Harris	2:15
7.	"Leiyla"	Markley, D. Harris	2:51
8.	"Here's Where You Belong"	P.F. Sloan	2:47
9.	"If You Want This Love"	Knight	2:47
10.	"'Scuse Me, Miss Rose"	Bob Johnston	3:01
11.	"High Coin"	Van Dyke Parks	1:52

Track list information from CD liner notes of the 2001 re-master of Part One, from Sundazed Music, Inc.

== Personnel ==
- Bob Markley – spoken word, backing vocals
- Michael Lloyd – vocals, electric guitar
- Danny Harris – vocals, electric guitar
- Ron Morgan – electric guitar
- Shaun Harris – vocals, bass guitar
- John Ware – drums
