= Jim Stallings =

American musician

Jim Stallings is an American musician who played as a bassist with the Sir Douglas Quintet and had a successful single as a solo artist with "Heya". As J.J. Light, Stallings also issued an LP Heya! in 1969, though another 11 songs recorded for a second album were not released until included as bonus tracks on a CD reissue of the first album in 2008.

Stallings was sent to promote the single in England, where he performed "Heya" on the Eamonn Andrews show. After that he became ill, and had to spend some time in a London hospital, before he returned home to Los Angeles.

In 2019, Stallings achieved great success in Albuquerque, New Mexico, where he made numerous recordings with Jeremy Barnes (Neutral Milk Hotel, A Hawk and A Hacksaw) as well as performing at several venues around the state with noted Albuquerque-based musicians like Barnes and AJ Woods. Stallings and his work were featured in a feature interview in Weekly Alibi with Barnes and News Editor August March. In August 2019, Stallings released a gospel album titled Sing to the King, which features Barnes, Heather Trost (of A Hawk and A Hacksaw) and mastering by Drake Hardin. As of October 2019, Stallings continues work on recording Christian music, a blues album and a recording of country classics.
