= Sonny Knight =

American singer-songwriter (1934–1998)

- Birth name: Joseph Coleman Smith
- Also known as: Joe Smith; Joseph C. Smith
- Born: May 17, 1934; Maywood, Illinois, U.S.
- Died: September 5, 1998 (aged 64); Maui, Hawaii, U.S.
- Genres: Pop, rhythm and blues
- Occupation(s): Singer, songwriter, pianist, author
- Years active: 1954–1997
- Labels: Aladdin, Specialty, Vita, Dot, Aura, Original Sound, Fifo, World Pacific

Joseph Coleman Smith (May 17, 1934 – September 5, 1998), who performed and recorded under the name Sonny Knight, was an American singer, songwriter and author. His biggest hit was "Confidential", which reached the pop and R&B charts in 1956, and he continued to record into the 1960s. In 1981, using his real name, he wrote The Day the Music Died, a fictionalised account of racism in the American music business in the 1950s.

== Biography ==
He was born in Maywood, Illinois, and moved to Los Angeles with his family in the early 1950s. He enrolled at Los Angeles State College intending to pursue an academic career, but became interested in the music business and, according to one source, visited the Mesner brothers at Aladdin Records to sell them a song, "Vicious, Vicious Vodka", that he had written for his idol, Amos Milburn; Milburn recorded the song in 1954. Another source suggests that Smith actively sought a recording contract himself, at the behest of a girlfriend. In any event, Aladdin offered him a recording contract, and, using the pseudonym Sonny Knight that he invented himself, released two singles on the label, including "But, Officer," later recorded by Steve Allen. The records were unsuccessful, and he recorded as Joe Smith for the Cal-West label before signing for Specialty Records.

After a couple more unsuccessful singles, recorded again as Sonny Knight, producer Robert "Bumps" Blackwell partnered him with songwriter Dorinda Morgan. She wrote the ballad "Confidential", which he recorded for the small Vita record label in Pasadena. Although the record label states that it was recorded with the Jack Collier Orchestra, in fact it was made with the Ernie Freeman Combo, which also included guitarist Irving Ashby and saxophonist Plas Johnson. Originally the B-side of "Jail Bird", the record was flipped by radio DJs. After initial local success, the record was licensed to the larger Dot label, and rose to no. 17 on the Billboard pop chart, and no. 8 on the R&B chart at the end of 1956.

Knight was unable to follow it up successfully, although he continued to record for Dot. He also worked as a session pianist in Los Angeles, on records by Sandy Nelson and others, and recorded for small labels including Original Sound, Fifo, and World Pacific. In the early 1960s he recorded for the Aura label, and in 1964 his song "If You Want This Love" reached no. 71 on the pop chart; its follow-up "Love Me As Though There Were No Tomorrow" reached no. 100. He gave up his recording career in the mid 1960s, moving in the 1970s to live in Hawaii, where he continued to sing in nightclubs.

In 1981, credited as Joseph C. Smith, his novel The Day the Music Died was published by Grove Press. It was based on his own experiences in the music business in the 1950s, and received generally good reviews, remaining in print for over 25 years. Rock critic Greil Marcus, in his book Dead Elvis, wrote that:

"[it is] the bitterest book ever written about how rock'n'roll came to be and what it turned into; its theme is racism....[W]hat really interests Smith is how a rich version of American black culture is transformed into a horrible, enormously profitable white parody of itself: as white labels sign black artists only to ensure their oblivion and keep those blacks they can't control penned up in the ghetto of the black charts; as white America, faced with something good, responds with a poison that will ultimately ruin even honest men... There is no question that much of what Smith describes took place.... But.. driven by its bitterness, Smith's story runs away from itself..."

Knight died in Hawaii in 1998 at the age of 64, following a stroke two years earlier.

A compilation CD of Sonny Knight's recordings, Confidential, was issued by Pacific Records in about 2001.
