= Bob Markley =

American singer-songwriter (1935–2003)

- 1967 publicity photo

Background information
- Born: Robert H. Markley; August 29, 1935; Tulsa, Oklahoma, U.S.
- Died: September 9, 2003 (aged 68) Los Angeles, California, U.S.
- Genres: Psychedelic rock
- Occupations: Singer, songwriter, record producer
- Instruments: Vocals, bongos, tambourine
- Years active: 1960–1970
- Labels: FiFo; Reprise; Amos; Forward
- Formerly of: The West Coast Pop Art Experimental Band

Robert H. Markley (August 29, 1935 – September 9, 2003) was an American singer-songwriter and record producer who co-founded the psychedelic rock band The West Coast Pop Art Experimental Band, in the late 1960s.

== Early life ==
Markley was the adopted son of an oil tycoon. He became a law graduate, and then a local television persona for the Oklahoma programming, Oklahoma Bandstand in 1958. He performed in several college bands and by 1960, started a decade-long music career.

== Early music career ==
In 1960 Markley moved to Los Angeles to pursue a music career. He was signed by Warner Bros. Records to release his first single, "Will We Meet Again", paired with "Tia Juana Ball", which was distributed in late 1960. Markley sang and played bongos. By late 1961, another single emerged on the same label, "Summers Comin' On", backed by "It Should Have Been Me". All of the songs were either written or co-written by Markley with composer Baker Knight, who later wrote "Shifting Sands" for The West Coast Pop Art Experimental Band on their second album, Part One, in 1967. Markley's solo career, however, stalled after the singles met with very little success. These rare compositions rested in obscurity for decades until they were included on the 2011 compilation album, The West Coast Pop Art Experimental Band Companion.

Before the end of 1965 Markley was introduced by his friend Kim Fowley, to a band, Laughing Wind. The band performed at a concert that also included The Yardbirds, which took place in Markley's mansion in Los Angeles after The Yardbirds could not book any other performance. Many directors and musicians including Jeff Beck and Jim McGuinn of The Byrds were also present as guests in the sizable gathering. The Laughing Wind comprised Markley's future bandmates Michael Lloyd, Danny Harris, and Shaun Harris. Markley was less concerned about the band's actual performance than he was with the crowd a rock band brought, particularly young women. His obsession with young girls would be part of Markley's personality that would directly affect his later music. Markley proposed that he join and fund the band. The group accepted Markley's offer, and The West Coast Pop Art Experimental Band was formed.

== The West Coast Pop Art Experimental Band ==
Using his legal expertise, Markley quickly controlled the name and productions of the band. Tracks on all the band's albums, except Where's My Daddy?, had Markley listed as the primary composer, even if he took no part in any actual writing. Markley did write some basic compositions during the band's existence, like "1906", which fit well into the psychedelic rock era of the late sixties. Several of his compositions were released as singles. Markley strived to achieve compositions equal to his bandmates', but with his sometimes disturbing lyrics, they did not sell successfully. Despite his lacking skills as a musician, Markley's input became key to the overall sound and style of the band.

With the band Markley produced six albums, one of which was under the name Markley A Group. While Markley contributed spoken word and backing vocals, the 1966 lineup had Danny Harris playing lead guitar, Shaun Harris at bass guitar, and Michael Lloyd with rhythm guitar. The addition of John Ware on drums completed the group. Lead vocals were shared among the band members, as determined by Markley. After their minor FiFo Records album consisting mostly of Laughing Wind recordings, Volume One was released, Markley's influence helped the band sign to the Reprise label for three albums, and smaller independent labels for the final two releases. The band was able to produce a wide variety of music ranging from folk rock, to guitar-led freakbeat, and multilayered, avant-garde compositions. Their most acclaimed album, 1968's Volume 3: A Child's Guide to Good and Evil, has been considered a psychedelic masterpiece.

The band's popularity as a live act came from their elaborate light shows which, according to Ware, were "the ultimate street happening for a while". Markley's role in the performances was restricted to tambourines and on occasions, backing vocals. However, the band's live performances did little to save the band from disbanding in 1970, after the album Markley A Group.

== Later life and death ==
Markley continued to work in the music business as a record producer, most notably on Jim Stallings' (a.k.a. J. J. Light) album, Heya!. Markley collaborated with Lloyd and Danny Harris on a gospel album called Goodness and Mercy, but, after the album's release, Markley dropped out of the music scene altogether. He lived a bohemian lifestyle after purchasing a smaller residence in Los Angeles in his efforts to interest women. Authorities attempted to arrest Markley on undisclosed charges involving two young women, but he temporarily evaded the law. However, incidents involving underage girls resulted in convictions on other occasions, compelling him to change his name to avoid scrutiny.

Combined with the traumatic event of losing his father and declining mental stability, Markley's health slowly deteriorated throughout his life. He showed himself sporadically to past band members and looked more obviously ill with each appearance. Bob Markley died on September 9, 2003, in Los Angeles, but the cause of his death was not reported.

== Discography ==
Singles (solo)

- "Will We Meet Again" b/w "Tia Juana Ball" – 1960
- "Summers Comin' On" b/w "It Should Have Been Me" – 1961

Albums (The West Coast Pop Art Experimental Band)

- Volume One – 1966
- Part One – 1967
- Vol. 2 (Breaking Through) – 1967
- Volume 3: A Child's Guide to Good and Evil – 1968
- Where's My Daddy? – 1969
- Markley A Group (credited as Markley a Group) – 1970
