= Shaun Harris =

- Born: March 2, 1946 (age 79); Colorado Springs, Colorado, United States
- Genres: Psychedelic rock; surf rock; country rock
- Occupation: Musician
- Instruments: Bass guitar; vocals
- Years active: 1963–2004
- Labels: Challenge; Living Legend; Reprise; Capitol

Shaun Harris (born March 2, 1946) is an American musician best-remembered as the bassist of the psychedelic rock band the West Coast Pop Art Experimental Band (WCPAEB). Throughout his music career, Harris worked closely with Michael Lloyd on projects outside the WCPAEB including the Rogues, California Spectrum, and Brigadune. In 1973, he recorded a self-titled solo album on Capitol Records.

== Biography ==
Born in Colorado Springs, Colorado, Harris is the eldest son of symphonic composer Roy Harris. In 1962, the family moved to Los Angeles, where a year later Shaun Harris, along with his younger brother Danny, began performing in the Kim Fowley-produced surf rock band the Snowmen. In 1964, the group released the "Ski Storm" single on Challenge Records. While attending the Hollywood Professional School, the Harris brothers befriended Michael Lloyd, the leader of the rival band the Rouges. Shortly afterwards, Shaun Harris assumed the role of bass guitarist with the Rouges, and recorded the single "Wanted: Dead or Alive" for Fowley's own Living Legend record label in 1965. Another project, known as the Laughing Wind, recorded the single, "Good to Be Around" in the same year.

The Harris brothers and Lloyd recorded demos, which would later appear on the West Coast Pop Art Experimental Band's debut album Volume One in 1966. Released on the small FiFo label, Volume One was made possible thanks to Bob Markley, a former scholar of law attempting to gain fame on the Sunset Strip with the group under his command. Shaun Harris is the only band member, other than Markley, to appear on every album recorded by the WCPAEB, including the final effort credited to "Markley A Group" in 1970. Between 1967 and 1968, while the group was on hiatus, Harris and Lloyd formed the side-project, California Spectrum, which performed live and released two singles "Sassafras" and "She May Call You Up Tonight" in early 1968. Following the distribution of Markley A Group, the WCPAEB disbanded.

A year after the band's demise, Harris recorded the solo single "I'll Cry Out from My Grave (God I'm Sorry)", a rare sunshine pop record produced by Lloyd and released under the alias Brigadune. In 1973, Harris signed with Capitol Records issuing a self-titled album which boasted a country rock sound unheard of in any of his earlier work. Recorded with top session musicians from the Wrecking Crew, Beach Boy Bruce Johnston, and Lloyd, Shaun Harris was nonetheless hindered by sharing the same release date as Pink Floyd's The Dark Side of the Moon. In the 1990s, the album acquired a cult following, particular among WCPAEB fans, and was reissued on Rev-Ola Records in 2005 with the mono version of "I'll Cry Out from My Grave (God I'm Sorry)". Music critic Jason Ankeny described Shaun Harris as mainstream pop far departing from Harris's stint with the WCPAEB, but also noted its "melodies and arrangements are atypically complex and its lyrics are profoundly introspective, exploring themes of melancholy, self-doubt, and even suicide with uncommon candor".

The poor sales of the album prompted Capitol Records to cut Harris from their roster. He reunited with Lloyd and his brother for smaller projects including Grand Concourse and Rockit, and also served as president of Barry Manilow's publishing company before retiring from music in 2004. Harris has since been living in Oregon to write a play about his life.
