= Michael Lloyd (music producer) =

American record producer, musician, songwriter and music supervisor

- Born: Michael Jeffrey Lloyd; New York City, United States
- Occupations: Record producer, musician, songwriter, music supervisor
- Instruments: Keyboards, guitar
- Years active: 1962 – present

Michael Jeffrey Lloyd is an American record producer, arranger, songwriter and musician. After working with Mike Curb, Kim Fowley and others in the mid-to-late 1960s on musical projects including the West Coast Pop Art Experimental Band, and Steven Spielberg's first short film, Amblin', he became a producer of such teen idol pop stars as the Osmonds, Shaun Cassidy and Leif Garrett in the 1970s.

During the 1980s, Lloyd supervised the music soundtrack for the film Dirty Dancing (1987)—including production of the hit "(I've Had) The Time of My Life"—and worked with Belinda Carlisle, Barry Manilow and many others. By his own account, Lloyd has earned over 100 gold and platinum records.

== Early life and musical career ==
Born in New York City, Lloyd learned classical piano and guitar as a child. By the age of 13, he had formed his own band at Beverly Hills High School, at the same time continuing to take lessons in music theory and composition. He also started writing songs and pitching them to record labels in Los Angeles, including Tower Records, a subsidiary of Capitol. By Lloyd's own account, Eddie Ray, the head of A&R at Tower, suggested that the teenage Lloyd work with Mike Curb, and the pair began collaborating on songs and record production. Other sources suggest that Lloyd and Curb were introduced to each other by Kim Fowley, who had signed Lloyd to a song-publishing deal. Lloyd also recorded surf music as a member of the New Dimensions, a group that included Jimmy Greenspoon, later of Three Dog Night.

Around 1964, Lloyd began performing with brothers Shaun and Danny Harris, who attended Hollywood Professional School with Lloyd. Together they formed a group initially called the Rogues, later renamed the Laughing Wind. They recorded demos with Fowley, who then introduced the band to Bob Markley, a law graduate and aspiring performer who had already had his own TV show in Oklahoma. With Fowley's support and Markley's financial backing, Lloyd became a member of the West Coast Pop Art Experimental Band with the Harris brothers, Markley and drummer John Ware, releasing an album, Part One, in 1967. Fowley also released some of the Laughing Wind's demos, with other tracks featuring Markley, as Volume One, credited to the West Coast Pop Art Experimental Band. Lloyd left the band shortly afterward, but returned to contribute to their 1969 album Where's My Daddy?.

In 1967, Lloyd wrote songs and produced Fowley's solo album Love Is Alive And Well: Sounds & Scenes of the Flower Love Generation, with Fowley referring in the liner notes to Lloyd as an "..18 year old arranger and engineer who owns his own recording studio, plays 9 instruments and is lead singer and leader of The Laughing Wind, a Tower recording group." Curb allowed Lloyd to use his Hollywood Boulevard studios, and together with musicians Stan Ayeroff and Steve Baim (who were also members of Max Frost and the Troopers), Lloyd wrote and produced an album, The Smoke, which Curb released on his own Sidewalk label in 1967. Lloyd and Fowley co-produced the only album by Los Angeles psychedelic rock band St. John Green, released in 1968, and in the same year, Lloyd arranged and produced the self-titled album by the band October Country. Lloyd also provided the music for Steven Spielberg's first short film, Amblin', and worked with Curb on other movie soundtracks, including The Devil's 8 (1969).

== The 1970s ==
By late 1969, Mike Curb had become president of MGM Records, and appointed Lloyd, then aged 20, as vice-president in charge of A&R. Among the artists Lloyd signed to the label was Lou Rawls, whose 1971 hit single and album, A Natural Man, he produced. As Curb purged the label of artists associated with drug use, Lloyd moved into more mainstream pop music, initially as the producer of several of the Osmonds' hits, including "Down by the Lazy River" and "Crazy Horses" in 1972. He also wrote and produced tracks on Donny Osmond's solo album Portrait of Donny, as well as later singles and albums by Donny and Marie, the Osmonds, and Engelbert Humperdinck. Lloyd later said:

"A publisher had a song he wanted Lou Rawls to sing. I could sign acts at MGM. Lou had been dropped by Capitol Records already and his career was over. But this publisher was really bright. He figured if he could get somebody to sign Lou Rawls, then Lou Rawls would have a deal and he could cut his song. So he hammered me and he hammered me to do this. Finally I said yes, and that record won a Grammy and all this kind of crazy stuff. And then—and here's where the other opportunity comes along—I had been resistant. I didn't want to do it; I had no idea what to do. But that record becomes successful, and then we sign the Osmonds, and Mike Curb says to the Osmonds, "This is Michael Lloyd, who just had a big hit record with Lou Rawls. Then the Osmonds go, "Ooh," right? If he had just introduced me as Michael Lloyd, a talented guy he knew, they would have gone, "Oh," right? I mean, it's a superficial business. So if I hadn't done the Lou Rawls record, he wouldn't have been able to introduce me to the Osmonds on that level, and I probably wouldn't have recorded their records."

Lloyd also continued to perform, initially as a member of a vocal group, Friends, and then forming a trio, Cotton, Lloyd and Christian, with Australian Darryl Cotton and Texan Chris Christian in 1975. The trio's version of the Del Shannon song "I Go to Pieces", a 1965 hit for Peter and Gordon, became a #66 hit on the Billboard Hot 100, and the group released an album, Cotton Lloyd & Christian. Although the album was not successful in the US, its tracks were repackaged by Curb and Lloyd in 1976, and used as the music soundtrack for the film The Pom Pom Girls. A second Cotton, Lloyd and Christian album, Number Two, was issued in 1977.

Lloyd began working with teen idol Shaun Cassidy in 1975, producing his debut single in Europe, "Morning Girl", as well as subsequent singles including his 1977 breakthrough US #1 hit "Da Doo Ron Ron". He also produced Cassidy's albums Shaun Cassidy (1976), Born Late (1977), Under Wraps (1978) and Room Service (1979). Over the same period, Lloyd worked with rival teen star Leif Garrett, and played on and produced his 1976 debut hit "Surfin' U.S.A." and his 1977 debut album. He produced Garrett's later albums Feel The Need (1978) and Same Goes For You (1979), and both wrote and produced Garrett's hit song "I Was Made for Dancin'". He worked with Debby Boone, producing several tracks on her album You Light Up My Life (but, contrary to some sources, not its title track). He also wrote and produced the original tracks on Japanese duo Pink Lady's first American album Pink Lady, after the duo had appeared on Garrett's 1979 television special.

== Later career ==
In 1986, Lloyd arranged and produced the debut album by Belinda Carlisle, Belinda, including the hit single "Mad About You". The same year, he was responsible as music supervisor for the soundtrack of the film Dirty Dancing, and for producing the tracks "(I've Had) The Time of My Life", by Bill Medley and Jennifer Warnes, and "She's Like the Wind", performed by Patrick Swayze. The song "(I've Had) The Time of My Life" was an international hit, reaching #1 on the Billboard pop chart in November 1987, and won the Academy Award for Best Original Song and a Grammy Award for Best Pop Performance by a Duo or Group with Vocals. Lloyd wrote and produced the Latin music used in the movie, which was issued on the LP More Dirty Dancing. He worked as a film producer on movies including Lovelines (1984), The Garbage Pail Kids Movie (1987) and Frankie and Johnny (1991). He also produced musical arrangements and wrote songs for the American media franchise Kidsongs.

Lloyd arranged and produced several tracks on Barry Manilow's self-titled 1989 album. He worked on several albums with Bobby Vinton, including Great Songs of Christmas. Other musicians with whom Lloyd has worked include Dionne Warwick, the Monkees, the Bellamy Brothers, Susie Allanson, Sammy Davis Jr., Maureen McGovern and Frank Sinatra. He co-produced Pat Boone's 1997 album In a Metal Mood. In more recent years, Lloyd has worked as producer with Kimberley Locke, the first performer to have three consecutive #1 Christmas songs, "Up on the Housetop" (2005), "Jingle Bells" (2006) and "Frosty the Snowman" (2007).

Lloyd has continued to work as music supervisor and producer on movie soundtracks in 1998, including those of Rudolph the Red-Nosed Reindeer: The Movie where he also provided the singing voice for Rudolph, and the 1998 film Godzilla, as well as on animated TV series. He established Studio M in 2000 as an independent national music video network, becoming its president. He also actively supports various children's charities.

== Personal life ==
Michael Lloyd married Patricia Ann Varble in 1980; they have four children.
