= 2012 in German television =

This is a list of German television related events from 2012.

== Events ==
- 10 February - Ivy Quainoo wins the first season of The Voice of Germany.
- 16 February - Roman Lob is selected to represent Germany at the 2012 Eurovision Song Contest with his song "Standing Still". He is selected to be the fifty-seventh German Eurovision entry during Unser Star für Baku held at the Brainpool Studios in Cologne.
- 28 April - Luca Hänni wins the ninth season of Deutschland sucht den Superstar.
- 23 May - Rhythmic gymnast Magdalena Brzeska and her partner Erich Klann win the fifth season of Let's Dance.
- 25 November - Mrs. Greenbird win the third season of X Factor.
- 14 December - Nick Howard wins the second season of The Voice of Germany.
- 16 December - 20-year-old singer and pianist Jean-Michel Aweh wins the sixth season of Das Supertalent.

== Debuts ==
=== International ===
- 28 August - (United States) 2 Broke Girls (2011-2017) (ProSieben)
- 19 September - (United States) Alcatraz (2012) (RTL Nitro)

=== BFBS ===
- (United Kingdom) Fleabag Monkeyface (2011-2012)

== Television shows ==
=== 1950s ===
- Tagesschau (1952–present)

=== 1960s ===
- heute (1963-present)

=== 1970s ===
- heute-journal (1978-present)
- Tagesthemen (1978-present)

=== 1980s ===
- Wetten, dass..? (1981-2014)
- Lindenstraße (1985–present)

=== 1990s ===
- Gute Zeiten, schlechte Zeiten (1992–present)
- Unter uns (1994-present)
- Verbotene Liebe (1995-2015)
- Schloss Einstein (1998–present)
- In aller Freundschaft (1998–present)
- Wer wird Millionär? (1999-present)

=== 2000s ===
- Deutschland sucht den Superstar (2002–present)
- Let's Dance (2006–present)
- Das Supertalent (2007–present)

=== 2010s ===
- The Voice of Germany (2011–present)

== Ending this year ==
- X Factor (2010-2012)

== Networks and services ==
=== Launches ===
Network	Type	Launch date	Notes	Source
Sat.1 Emotions	Cable television	17 January		
RTL Nitro	Cable television	1 April		
ZDFneo HD	Cable and satellite	30 April		
ProSieben Fun	Cable television	3 May		
glitz*	Cable television	8 May		
Sky Atlantic	Cable television	23 May		
Gems TV	Cable television	1 October		

=== Conversions and rebrandings ===
Old network name	New network name	Type	Conversion Date	Notes	Source
EinsExtra	Tagesschau24	Cable television	1 May		

=== Closures ===
Network	Type	End date	Notes	Sources
Sat.1 Comedy	Cable television	3 May		
Gems TV	Cable television	18 December		

== See also ==
- 2012 in Germany
