= X Factor (German TV series) season 1 =

X Factor
- Season 1
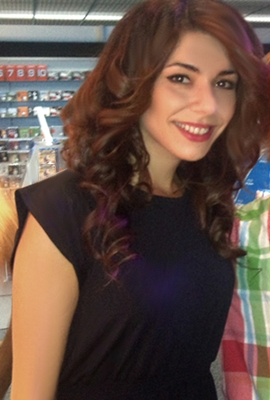
- Hosted by: Jochen Schropp
- Judges: Sarah Connor; George Glueck; Till Brönner
- Winner: Edita Abdieski
- Runner-up: Big Soul

Release
- Original network: VOX with first two Kick-off show on RTL
- Original release: 20 August – 9 November 2010

Season chronology
- Next → Season 2

The first Season of X Factor was started in 2010. The auditions were held in April 2010. The first show started on 20 August 2010. The Judges are Sarah Connor (16-24), George Glueck (Groups) and Till Brönner (25+).

There are four phases: 1. Auditions 2. Bootcamp 3. Judge's House 4. Live Shows

== Judge's House ==
The 18 acts who reached the Judge's Houses

- Brönner's acts (over 25): Anthony Thet, Denise Modjallal, Sven Merckel, Meral Al-Mer, Edita Abdieski and Alexander Knappe
- Connor's acts (16-24): Pino Severino, Mati Gavriel, Hendrik Ehrenthal, Caprice Edwards, Marlon Bertzbach and Maximilian Brands
- Gluek's acts (Groups): Drop-Dead-Dinky-Di, Big Soul, Urban Candy, LaFamille, Karma and Predestination

Nine of the 18 acts were eliminated with the 9 remaining moving to the live shows, three from each category. The eliminated acts were:

- (Over 25-s): Alexander Knappe, Denise Modjallal, Sven Merckel
- (16-24s): Caprice Edwards, Hendrik Ehrental, Maximilian Brands
- (Groups): Predestination, Karma, Drop-Dead-Dinky-Di

== Contestants ==
The live shows commenced on 21 September 2010. The following artists made it to the live shows. Ages are as of the date of the show (2010).

Key:

– Winner
– Runner-up

Category (mentor)	Acts		
16–24s (Connor)	Marlon Bertzbach (18)	Mati Gavriel (24)	Pino Severino (18)
25-and-overs (Brönner)	Anthony Thet (30)	Edita Abdieski (25)	Meral Al-Mer (29)
Groups (Glueck)	Big Soul	LaFamille	Urban Candy

Big Soul consist of Nadine (28), Alexandra (33), Martina (33), and Michelle (35).
LaFamille consist of Joel (35), Erkan (32) & Guido (31).
Urban Candy consists of Roman (26), Marc (24) & Candy (25).

== Results table ==
Contestants' colour key:

– Till Brönner's contestants (over 25s)
– Sarah Connor's contestants (16–24s)
– George Glueck's contestants (groups)
– Bottom two
– Eliminated without a final showdown
– Contestant became the Runner-Up
– Highest Vote of a Week

	Week 1	Week 2	Week 3	Week 4	Week 5	Week 6	Week 7	Week 8
Edita Abdieski	4th 13.92%	5th 12.91%	3rd 15.33%	3rd 18.15%	3rd 19.43%	1st 27.42%	1st 41.53%	Winner; 74.10%
Big Soul	1st 25.00%	1st 25.52%	1st 22.40%	2nd 19.50%	2nd 22.50%	4th 23.19%	2nd 30.18%	Runner-Up; 25.90%
Mati Gavriel	5th 10.36%	4th 13.53%	5th 10.71%	4th 16.33%	5th 14.90%	2nd 25.05%	3rd 28.29%	Eliminated (Week 7)
Anthony Thet	6th 7.04%	2nd 14.62%	4th 11.55%	5th 16.31%	1st 27.02%	3rd 24.34%	Eliminated (Week 6)	
Marlon Bertzbach	2nd 18.87%	3rd 13.89%	6th 10.52%	1st 20.25%	4th 16.15%	Eliminated (Week 5)		
Pino Severino	3rd 15.24%	7th 7.04%	2nd 20.94%	6th 9.46%	Eliminated (Week 4)			
Urban Candy	7th 6.08%	6th 9.21%	7th 8.55%	Eliminated (Week 3)				
Meral Al-Mer	8th 1.80%	8th 2.28%	Eliminated (Week 2)					
LaFamille	9th 1.69%	Eliminated (Week 1)						
Bottom two	Meral Al-Mer, LaFamille	Meral Al-Mer, Pino Severino	Marlon Bertzbach, Urban Candy	Anthony Thet, Pino Severino	Marlon Bertzbach, Mati Gavriel	Anthony Thet, Big Soul	No judges' vote or final showdown: public votes alone decide who is eliminated and who ultimately wins	
Brönner's vote to eliminate	LaFamille	Pino Severino	Urban Candy	Pino Severino	Marlon Bertzbach	Big Soul	No judges' vote or final showdown: public votes alone decide who is eliminated and who ultimately wins	
Connors's vote to eliminate	LaFamille	Meral Al-Mer	Urban Candy	Anthony Thet	Marlon Bertzbach	Anthony Thet	No judges' vote or final showdown: public votes alone decide who is eliminated and who ultimately wins	
Glueck's vote to eliminate	Meral Al-Mer	Meral Al-Mer	Marlon Bertzbach	Pino Severino	Marlon Bertzbach	Anthony Thet	No judges' vote or final showdown: public votes alone decide who is eliminated and who ultimately wins	
Eliminated	LaFamille; 2 of 3 votes	Meral Al-Mer; 2 of 3 votes	Urban Candy; 2 of 3 votes	Pino Severino; 2 of 3 votes	Marlon Bertzbach; 3 of 3 votes	Anthony Thet; 2 of 3 votes	Mati Gavriel; 28,29% to save	Big Soul; 25,90% to win
Eliminated	LaFamille; 2 of 3 votes	Meral Al-Mer; 2 of 3 votes	Urban Candy; 2 of 3 votes	Pino Severino; 2 of 3 votes	Marlon Bertzbach; 3 of 3 votes	Anthony Thet; 2 of 3 votes	Mati Gavriel; 28,29% to save	Edita Abdieski; 74,10% to win

== Live show details ==
=== Week 1 (21 September 2010) ===
- Theme: Playlist 2010
- Celebrity Performer: Enrique Iglesias ("I Like It")

Contestants' performances on the first live show
Act	Order	Song	Result
Anthony Thet	1	"Secrets"	Safe
LaFamille	2	"In My Head"	Bottom two
Mati Gavriel	3	"Undisclosed Desires"	Safe
Edita Abdieski	4	"Empire State of Mind (Part II) Broken Down"	Safe
Urban Candy	5	"Meet Me Halfway"	Safe
Pino Severino	6	"She Said"	Safe
Meral Al-Mer	7	"Elektrisches Gefühl"	Bottom two
Big Soul	8	"Bad Boys"	Safe
Marlon Bertzbach	9	"I Like"	Safe
Final showdown details
Meral Al-Mer	1	"Ein Herz kann man nicht reparieren"	Safe
LaFamille	2	"Change"	Eliminated

Judges' votes to eliminate

- Brönner: LaFamille, backed his own act Meral Al-Mer
- Connor: LaFamille, due to the lack of surprise and potential
- Glueck: Meral Al-Mer, backed his own act LaFamille

=== Week 2 (28 September 2010) ===
- Theme: Blockbuster Night
- Celebrity Performer: Hurts ("Wonderful Life")

Contestants' performances on the second live show
Act	Order	Song	Result
Pino Severino	1	"Killer/Papa Was a Rollin' Stone"	Bottom two
Urban Candy	2	"Crazy in Love"	Safe
Meral Al-Mer	3	"Irgendwie, Irgendwo, Irgendwann"	Bottom two
Anthony Thet	4	"Purple Rain"	Safe
Marlon Bertzbach	5	"The Blower's Daughter"	Safe
Edita Abdieski	6	"Street Life"	Safe
Mati Gavriel	7	"Girl, You'll Be a Woman Soon"	Safe
Big Soul	8	"Think"	Safe
Final showdown details
Meral Al-Mer	1	"Young Hearts Run Free"	Eliminated
Pino Severino	2	"Stop Me"	Safe

Judges' votes to eliminate

- Brönner: Pino Severino, backed his own act Meral Al-Mer
- Connor: Meral Al-Mer, backed her own act Pino Severino
- Glueck: Meral Al-Mer, because of missing singing abilities

=== Week 3 (5 October 2010) ===
- Theme: King & Queens of Pop
- Celebrity Performer: Seal ("Secret")

Contestants' performances on the third live show
Act	Order	Song	Result
Edita Abdieski	1	"Respect"	Safe
Marlon Bertzbach	2	"Boulevard of Broken Dreams"	Bottom two
Urban Candy	3	"Geh' davon aus"	Bottom two
Mati Gavriel	4	"Don't Stop Me Now"	Safe
Pino Severino	5	"It's a Man's Man's Man's World"	Safe
Anthony Thet	6	"I'll Be Waiting"	Safe
Big Soul	7	"Free Your Mind"	Safe
Final showdown details
Marlon Bertzbach	1	"Last Request"	Safe
Urban Candy	2	"Ding"	Eliminated

Judges' votes to eliminate

- Brönner: Urban Candy, because they can't deliver their message and don't feel united as a group
- Connor: Urban Candy, backed her own act Marlon Bertzbach
- Glueck: Marlon Bertzbach, backed his own act Urban Candy

=== Week 4 (12 October 2010) ===
- Theme: Mystery Night
- Celebrity Performers: Usher ("DJ Got Us Fallin' in Love") and Culcha Candela ("Move It")

Contestants' performances on the fourth live show
Act	Order	Song	Result
Marlon Bertzbach	1	"Zombie"	Safe
Edita Abdieski	2	"Heavy Cross"	Safe
Pino Severino	3	"Sympathy for the Devil"	Bottom two
Mati Gavriel	4	"Hallelujah"	Safe
Big Soul	5	"Thriller"	Safe
Anthony Thet	6	"Black Hole Sun"	Bottom two
Final showdown details
Anthony Thet	1	"My Love Is Your Love"	Safe
Pino Severino	2	"The Climb"	Eliminated

Judges' votes to eliminate

- Brönner: Pino Severino, backed his own act Anthony Thet
- Connor: Anthony Thet, backed her own act Pino Severino
- Glueck: Pino Severino, because of his second bottom two appearance

=== Week 5 (19 October 2010) ===
- Theme: Loud vs. Quiet
- Celebrity Performers: Till Brönner ("Summer Breeze")

Contestants' performances on the fifth live show
Act	Order	Loud Song	Quiet Song	Result
Mati Gavriel	1	"Song 2"	"Sexed Up"	Bottom two
Big Soul	2	"Sex on Fire"	"One"	Safe
Anthony Thet	3	"Walk This Way"	"Under the Bridge"	Safe
Edita Abdieski	4	"Just Like a Pill"	"Russian Roulette"	Safe
Marlon Bertzbach	5	"Closer to the Edge"	"Nothing Else Matters"	Bottom two
Final showdown details
Act	Order	Song		Result
Marlon Bertzbach	1	"Feeling Good"		Eliminated
Mati Gavriel	2	"Hurt"		Safe

Judge's vote to eliminate

- Brönner: Marlon Bertzbach
- Connor: Marlon Bertzbach
- Glueck: Marlon Bertzbach

=== Week 6 (26 October 2010) ===
- Theme: A night at the club
- Celebrity Performers: Sarah Connor ("Real Love")

Contestants' performances on the sixth live show
Act	Order	Song 1	Song 2	Result
Big Soul	1	"It's Raining Men"	"From Zero to Hero"	Bottom two
Anthony Thet	2	"When Love Takes Over"	"Give It to Me Right"	Bottom two
Edita Abdieski	3	"Why Don't You Love Me"	"Release Me"	Safe
Mati Gavriel	4	"Music"	"California Gurls"	Safe
Final showdown details
Act	Order	Song		Result
Anthony Thet	1	"Never Ever"		Eliminated
Big Soul	2	"You Can't Hurry Love"		Safe

Judge's vote to eliminate

- Brönner: Big Soul, backed his own act Anthony Thet
- Connor: Anthony Thet
- Glueck: Anthony Thet, backed his own act Big Soul

=== Week 7 (2 November 2010) ===
- Theme: Michael Jackson & Friends
- Celebrity Performers: Gossip ("Men in Love") and Flo Rida ("Club Can't Handle Me")
- Group Performance: "Over the Rainbow"
- The act with the fewest votes was eliminated from the competition.

Contestants' performances on the seventh live show
Act	Order	Friends Song	Order	Jackson Song	Result
Edita Abdieski	1	"You Are So Beautiful"	4	"Blame It on the Boogie"	Safe
Mati Gavriel	2	"Imagine"	5	"You Are Not Alone"	Eliminated
Big Soul	3	"As"	6	"I'll Be There"	Safe

=== Week 8 (9 November 2010) ===
- Theme: Final
- Celebrity Performers: "Loca" (Shakira) and "Bitte Hör nicht auf zu träumen" (Xavier Naidoo) and "Break my Chains" (Sarah Connor)
- Group Performance (Top 9): "Back for Good"
- The Celebrity Guests performed with one act.

Contestants' performances on the eighth live show
Act	Order	Song	Order	Celebrity Duet	Order	Winner's Song	Result
Big Soul	1	"That's What Friends Are For"	3	"Underneath Your Clothes" (with Shakira)	5	"I've come to Life"	Runner-Up
Edita Abdieski	2	"Run"	4	"Wo willst du hin?" (with Xavier Naidoo)	6	"I've come to Life"	Winner
