= 2011 in German television =

This is a list of German television related events from 2011.

== Events ==
- 7 May – Pietro Lombardi wins the eighth season of Deutschland sucht den Superstar.
- 14 May – The 56th Eurovision Song Contest is held at the Esprit Arena in Düsseldorf. Azerbaijan wins the contest with the song "Running Sacred", performed by Eli & Nikki.
- 18 May – The Kelly Family singer Maite Kelly and her partner Christian Polanc win the fourth season of Let's Dance.
- 8 June – TV chef Horst Lichter and his wife Nada become the first contestants to win €1million on Rette die Million!.
- 12 September – Marc Sonnen wins the eleventh season of Big Brother Germany.
- 6 December – David Pfeffer wins the second season of X Factor.
- 17 December – 27-year-old panpipe player Leo Rojas wins the fifth season of Das Supertalent.

== Debuts ==
=== Free for air ===
==== Domestic ====
- 24 November – The Voice of Germany (2011–present)

==== International ====
- 4 March – United States of Tara (2009–2011) (Das Erste)
- 23 April – The Jungle Book (2010–2015) (ZDF)

=== Cable ===
==== International ====
- 18 September – //The Amazing World of Gumball (2011–2019) (Cartoon Network)
- 19 September – /My Little Pony: Friendship is Magic (2010–2019) (Nickelodeon)
- 8 November – /The Octonauts (2010–present) (Disney Junior)

== Military Television Debuts ==
=== BFBS ===
- Everything's Rosie (2010–2015)
- /Mrs Brown's Boys (2011–present)
- Driver Dan's Story Train (2010–2013)
- Sooty (2011–present)

== Television shows ==
=== 1950s ===
- Tagesschau (1952–present)

=== 1960s ===
- heute (1963–present)

=== 1970s ===
- heute-journal (1978–present)
- Tagesthemen (1978–present)

=== 1980s ===
- Wetten, dass..? (1981–2014)
- Lindenstraße (1985–present)

=== 1990s ===
- Gute Zeiten, schlechte Zeiten (1992–present)
- Marienhof (1992–2011)
- Unter uns (1994–present)
- Verbotene Liebe (1995–2015)
- Schloss Einstein (1998–present)
- In aller Freundschaft (1998–present)
- Wer wird Millionär? (1999–present)

=== 2000s ===
- Deutschland sucht den Superstar (2002–present)
- Let's Dance (2006–present)
- Das Supertalent (2007–present)

=== 2010s ===
- X Factor (2010–2012)

== Ending this year ==
- Big Brother Germany (2000–2011, 2015–present)
- Marienhof (1992–2011)

== Networks and services ==
=== Launches ===
| Network | Type | Launch date | Notes | Source |
|---|---|---|---|---|
| MTV Brand New | Cable television | 1 February | | |
| ZDFinfokanal | Cable and satellite | 30 April | | |
| Cartoonito | Cable television | 12 October | | |

=== Conversions and rebrandings ===
| Old network name | New network name | Type | Conversion Date | Notes | Source |
|---|---|---|---|---|---|
| ZDFtheaterkanal | ZDFkultur | Cable television | 7 May | | |
| Playhouse Disney | Disney Junior | Cable television | 14 July | | |
| ZDFinfokanal | ZDFinfo | Cable television | 5 September | | |

=== Closures ===
| Network | Type | End date | Notes | Sources |
|---|---|---|---|---|
| 9Live | Cable television | 9 August | | |

== Deaths ==
| Date | Name | Age | Cinematic Credibility |
|---|---|---|---|
| 6 August | Rudolf Rohlinger | 85 | German journalist & TV host |

== See also ==
- 2011 in Germany
