= I've Come to Life =

Single by Edita Abdieski

from the album One
- Released: 10 November 2010
- Length: 3:04
- Label: Sony Music
- Songwriter(s): Florian Jakob; Chris Buseck; Raphaël Schillebeeckx
- Producer(s): Marek Pompetzki; Paul NZA; Cecil Remmler

Edita Abdieski singles chronology
"Wenn ig nume wüsst" (2008)	"I've Come to Life" (2010)	"The Key" (2011)

"I've Come to Life" is a pop song by Swiss singer Edita Abdieski. The track was released as Abdieski's debut single on November 10, 2010 in German-speaking Europe, following her triumph on the German television talent show X Factor the same day. It reached the top ten in Germany and Switzerland.

== Music video ==
A music video for "I've Come to Life," directed by Sandra Marschner, made its premiere on Bild.de on 23 November 2010.

== Track listing ==
Digital single
No.	Title	Writer(s)	Producer(s)	Length
1.	"I've Come to Life"	Florian Jakob; Chris Buseck; Raphaël Schillebeeckx	Pompetzki; NZA; Remmler^{[a]}	3:04
2.	"Heavy Cross"	Beth Ditto; Brace Paine; Hannah Blilie	Philipp Schwär	2:27

Notes

- ^a signifies an additional producer

== Charts ==
Chart performance for "I've Come to Life"
Chart (2010)	Peak position
Austria (Ö3 Austria Top 40)	27
Europe (European Hot 100 Singles)	36
Germany (GfK)	9
Switzerland (Schweizer Hitparade)	8

== Release history ==
Release history and formats for "I've Come to Life"
Region	Date	Format	Label	Ref.
Various	10 November 2010	Digital download	Sony Music	
Various	12 November 2010	CD single	Sony Music	
