= Kismet (EP) =

EP by Belinda Carlisle
- Released: May 12, 2023
- Recorded: 2022
- Length: 18:25
- Labels: RAF; BMG

Belinda Carlisle chronology
Wilder Shores (2017)	Kismet (2023)	Once Upon a Time in California (2025)

Singles from Kismet
- 1. "Big Big Love" Released: March 17, 2023; 2. "If U Go" Released: June 2, 2023

Kismet is an extended play by Belinda Carlisle, released on May 12, 2023, through RAF and BMG Rights Management.

== Background ==
Belinda Carlisle and Diane Warren have a long history of working together after first collaborating on Carlisle's 1987 album, Heaven on Earth, which featured the Warren written songs, "I Get Weak" and "World Without You".

Carlisle's last English-language pop record, A Woman & a Man was released in 1996, before hitting pause on her recording career while focusing on her live shows.

A new collection of songs was teased in October 2022 with Carlisle announcing "I'm making a music video today for the first time in over 25 years" via Twitter.

In February 2023, Carlisle said "27 years on from making my last English language pop record I really wasn't thinking I would ever make one again... and I was quite happy with that idea. Then a chance encounter in a coffee shop led me back to the wonderful Diane Warren and she gave me the incredible gift of this song and the other songs on my upcoming EP." Carlisle pondered on the idea of recording new music, adding "But I went to the studio and I don't even know what to say – it was so good. There are about three singles on the EP and they're incredible."

Warren added, "I'm so excited for everyone to hear Belinda's new record, she's never sounded better. It's so great to be working together again after all these years."

The EP track listing and cover art were revealed via Twitter on March 16, 2023.

== Reception ==
Professional ratings
Review scores
Source	Rating
Goldmine	4/5 stars
Retropop Magazine	4/5 stars

Retropop Magazine said "Authentically Belinda, all five songs touch different bases and reference various eras from her career", adding "Undoubtedly her strongest material since the early-nineties, Kismet is a welcome reminder not only of Belinda's power as one of the greatest pop stars of a generation, but also Diane Warren's knack for penning a killer hit." John Curley of Goldmine magazine stated that Kismet has "a bit of the feel of the pop of Carlisle's solo heyday, the mid-to-late 1980s, but with modern touches, so it doesn’t feel dated or retro", further stating that all songs on the EP are "radio friendly".

The single "If U Go" debuted at #30 on the Billboard Adult Contemporary Chart in September 2023, her first appearance on that chart since "Summer Rain" in 1990. The song later peaked at #29.

== Track listing ==
All tracks are written by Diane Warren.

Kismet track listing
No.	Title	Producer(s)	Length
1.	"Big Big Love"	Mathia-Mathithiahu Gavriel; Peter Stengaard	3:46
2.	"If U Go"	Gavriel	3:26
3.	"Deeper Into You"	Gavriel	3:50
4.	"I Couldn't Do That to Me"	Gavriel; Stengaard	3:56
5.	"Sanity"	Gavriel	3:27
Total length:			18:25

== Charts ==
Chart performance for Kismet
Chart (2023)	Peak position
Scottish Albums (Official Charts)	7
UK Albums (Official Charts)	95
UK Independent Albums (Official Charts)	4
US Top Album Sales (Billboard)	40
UK Album Sales Chart (OCC)	9
UK Vinyl Chart (OCC)	7

== Release history ==
Release history for Kismet
Region	Date	Label	Format	Ref
Various	May 12, 2023	RAF; BMG	Digital download; streaming	
Various	August 25, 2023	RAF; BMG	CD; vinyl	
