= Big Big Love (Belinda Carlisle song) =

Single by Belinda Carlisle

from the album Kismet
- Released: March 17, 2023
- Genre: Synth-pop; dance-pop
- Length: 3:38
- Label: RAF; BMG
- Songwriter: Diane Warren
- Producers: Mathia-Mathithiahu Gavriel; Peter Stengaard

Belinda Carlisle singles chronology
"Gonna Be You" (2023)	"Big Big Love" (2023)	"If U Go" (2023)

Music video
- "Big Big Love" on YouTube

"Big Big Love" is a pop song written by Diane Warren and performed by Belinda Carlisle. It was released on March 17, 2023, as the lead single from Carlisle's extended play Kismet, Carlisle's first new English language studio collection in over 25 years.

== Background ==
Belinda Carlisle and Diane Warren have a long history of working together after first collaborating on Carlisle's 1987 album, Heaven on Earth.

Carlisle announced the release of "Big Big Love" via Twitter in October 2022 alongside the quote "I'm making a music video today for the first time in over 25 years."

In early 2023, Carlisle said "27 years on from making my last English language pop record I really wasn't thinking I would ever make one again… and I was quite happy with that idea. Then a chance encounter in a coffee shop led me back to the wonderful Diane Warren and she gave me the incredible gift of this song and the other songs on my upcoming EP." Warren added, "It's so great to be working together again after all these years. From 'I Get Weak' and now to 'Big Big Love', a new chapter has begun. I can't wait for everyone to hear these new hits."

Carlisle performed the song during her BBC Radio 2 Piano Room set in February 2023, prior to its release.

== Reception ==
Markos Papadatos from Digital Journal said "Carlisle exudes a great deal of energy and charm in her delivery of 'Big Big Love', where she allows her harking, crystalline to shine. The song stands out lyrically, sonically and vocally. Belinda Carlisle is like fine wine, where she only gets better with time and experience. It will certainly resonate well with her fans and listeners."

Eddie Fu from Consequent of Sound said "With soaring, upbeat production by Mati Gavriel, 'Big Big Love' lives up to its name as Carlisle chases an all-encompassing romance."

Michael Major from Broadway World said "With a great vocal performance, driving synths and an amazing hook, 'Big Big Love' sounds as huge as its title, with all the 'hear it once, love it always' appeal of Belinda's biggest hits."

Women In Pop described the song as "a glittering synthpop anthem, with moments of brooding darkness leading into an uplifting chorus with gorgeous backing vocals adding layers and texture."

Radio Creme Brulee gave the song 3.5 out of 5 stars saying "On 'Big Big Love', Belinda eschews the power-pop template of her biggest hits in favor of an up-tempo synth-driven sound with a spring in its step... The songwriting of Diane Warren transcends genre boundaries and works with any sort of treatment and this synth-driven track is yet another reflection of this reality. The duo manages to recreate at least song of the magic of their last creative partnership in the 80s without rehashing it."

Retropop Magazine said "'Big Big Love' is a full circle moment, drawing on her new wave-inspired work with the band and anthemic solo hits that wouldn't sound out of place on the Live Your Life Be Free album."

== Personnel ==
Credits adapted from Tidal:

- Diane Warren – songwriting
- Mathia-Mathithiahu Gavriel – production, drum programming, keyboards, synthesizer, engineering, vocal production
- Peter Stengaard – production, keyboards, synthesizer
- Mario Luccy – engineering
- Trevor Case – engineering
- Charlotte Caffey – backing vocals
- Jennifer Karr – backing vocals
