= Edita Abdieski =

Swiss pop singer

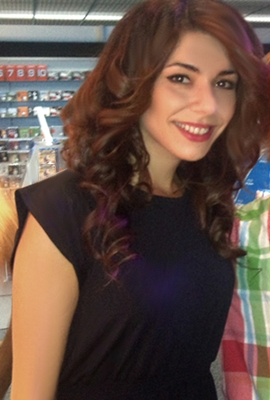
- Edita Abdieski (2011)

Background information
- Born: Edita Abdieski; 14 November 1984 (age 41); Bern, Switzerland
- Genre: Pop
- Occupation: Singer
- Years active: 2006–present
- Labels: Columbia, Sony
- Website: www.edita.de

Edita Abdieski (born 14 November 1984) is a Swiss pop singer. She rose to fame during the debut series of the German X Factor show, which she won in November 2010.

== Early life ==
Abdieski is the eldest child born to a Macedonian Albanian father and a Montenegrin Albanian mother. Raised in Bern alongside three younger siblings, she spent much of her childhood in the Bern borough of Bümpliz-Oberbottigen, where she was enrolled at primary and secondary school. Her father died of cancer in 1992. At eleven, Abdieski became part of her first school band and by the age of thirteen, she began writing songs. After leaving school, she was trained as qualified office employee, but as she hoped to embark on a professional singing career, Abdieski enrolled at the Swiss Musical Academy in Bern – much against the wishes of her mother, who was sceptical about her daughter's ambition, prompting Abdieski to leave home and move into a girls' flat-sharing community in 2002. To fund her academical training, she was forced to take four side jobs at times.

== Career ==
=== 2002—2009: Career beginnings ===
In 2002, a producer asked Abdieski and school friend Vanessa Tancredi to collaborate on a mundart album, a collection of songs in Swiss German dialect. Barely trained in mundart singing, Abdieski even so accepted the offer to record a full-length album, and during the following two years, the pair worked with production duo Thomas Fässler and Ben Mühlethaler on what would eventually become the debut album of Vanessædita.

Meanwhile, Abdieski was hired as a backing vocalist for the Swiss pop–rock band Lunik and worked with musician Santiago Cortés on his debut album Welcome to My Airline (2005). The album's leading single, "Don't Leave Me," sung and co-written by Abdieski, reached number forty on the Swiss Singles Chart. Still with Vanessædita, Abdieski was cast in the leading role of Kimberly in the musical Dance Me! – The Streetdance Musical in autumn 2005. A same-titled album, on which she appeared along with her ensemble, was released in January 2006 but failed to chart.

After Vanessædita's contract signing with Muve Recordings, their album Z'Debü ("The Debut") was finally released in Switzerland in March 2006. Although its first single "Wenn ig nume wüsst" entered the top fifty of the Swiss Singles Chart, the pop soul–influenced album underperformed commercially, only reaching number eighty-two on the Swiss Albums Chart. In 2007, Abdieski and Tancredi disbanded amicably, citing musical differences. Abdieski later stated, that after one album, she had become aware that mundart singing was "not [her] thing."

=== 2010: X Factor ===
Abdieski auditioned for the debut series of X Factor in 2010, singing Joss Stone's "Tell Me 'Bout It". She was mentored by Till Brönner and was announced the winner on 9 November 2010, winning a record deal with Sony Music.

Episode	Theme / Date	Song title	Original performer	Result (Placement)
Casting	Free choice	"Tell Me 'bout It"	Joss Stone	to Bootcamp
Bootcamp	Free choice	"Mama Do (Uh Oh, Uh Oh)"	Pixie Lott	to Judges' House
Judges' House	Free choice	"With a Little Help from My Friends"	Joe Cocker	to the Live Shows
Live show 1	Playlist 2010 (21 September 2010)	"Empire State of Mind"	Alicia Keys	13.92% (4/9)
Live show 2	Blockbuster Night (28 September 2010)	"Street Life"	Randy Crawford	12.91% (5/8)
Live show 3	Kings and Queens of Pop (5 October 2010)	"Respect"	Aretha Franklin	15.33% (3/7)
Live show 4	Mystery Night (12 October 2010)	"Heavy Cross"	Gossip	18.15% (3/6)
Live show 5	Laut und leise (Loud and Quiet) (19 October 2010)	"Just Like a Pill"	Pink	19.43% (3/5)
Live show 5	Laut und leise (Loud and Quiet) (19 October 2010)	"Russian Roulette"	Rihanna	19.43% (3/5)
Live show 6	A Night at the Club (26 October 2010)	"Release Me"	Agnes	27.42% (1/4)
Live show 6	A Night at the Club (26 October 2010)	"Why Don't You Love Me"	Beyoncé Knowles	27.42% (1/4)
Live show 7	Michael Jackson & Friends (2 November 2010)	"Blame It on the Boogie"	The Jackson Five	41.53% (1/3)
Live show 7	Michael Jackson & Friends (2 November 2010)	"You Are So Beautiful"	Diana Ross	41.53% (1/3)
Live show 8	Finale (9 November 2010)	"Run"	Leona Lewis	74.10% (1/2)
Live show 8	Finale (9 November 2010)	"Wo Willst Du Hin"	Xavier Naidoo	74.10% (1/2)
Live show 8	Finale (9 November 2010)	"I've Come to Life"	Edita Abdieski	74.10% (1/2)

=== 2010: First Studio Album One ===
In November and December 2010, Edita was recording her debut studio album which will be called One. The record will be released in March 2011. It will include her top ten hit "I've Come to Life" and her 2nd single "The Key" which was written by Jörgen Elofsson who has also written songs for Celine Dion Britney Spears and Il Divo. Another highlight will be a feature with Latin star Ricky Martin. The track is called "The Best Thing About Me Is You" and features writing from another Swedish heavyweight, Andreas Carlsson. Keeping up the Scandinavian presence are Norwegian production/songwriting teams Dsign Music and Tracksville ("When The Music Is Over"), as well as writers Mads Hauge ("Another Universe") and Torgeir Bjordal ("I Don't Know"). In January Edita won the DIVA Award in the category "Talent of the Year". Abdieski shot the video for her single "The Key" in Teneriffa. On 25 January 2011 it was confirmed that another track on One will be called "Give A Little Love, Get A Little Love". The song was written by Ben Cullum, Jamie Cullum's brother.

=== 2011: Edita Club Tour and new album ===
In June 2011, Edita was on her first Club Tour in four German and two Swiss cities. She presented two new songs called "Done With You" and "Really Love Me", which she wrote by herself. The two songs are from her expected upcoming second studio album.

== Discography ==
=== Studio albums ===
Year	Title	Chart positions (peak)				Sales
Year	Title	GER	AUT	SWI	EU	Sales
2011	One	32	52	10	–	Worldwide: –

=== Singles ===
Year	Title	Chart positions (peak)				Album
Year	Title	GER	AUT	SWI	EU	Album
2010	"I've Come to Life"	9	27	8	37	One
2011	"The Key"	51	–	–	–	One

=== Featuring Singles ===
Year	Title	Chart positions (peak)				Album
Year	Title	GER	AUT	SWI	EU	Album
2011	"The Best Thing About Me Is You" (Ricky Martin feat. Edita)	–	–	–	–	Música + Alma + Sexo

== Awards ==
Year	Nominee / work	Award	Result
2010	Edita Abdieski	Diva Award – Talent of the Year	Won
2011	Edita Abdieski	Prix Walo – Newcomer of the Year	Nominated

== See also ==
- X Factor (Germany season 1)

Preceded by None	X Factor; Winner; 2010	Succeeded by David Pfeffer
