= One (Edita Abdieski album) =

Studio album by Edita Abdieski
- Released: 18 March 2011
- Length: 53:12
- Label: Sony Music
- Producer: Desmond Child; Jörgen Elofsson; Robert Habolin; Paul NZA; Marek Pompetzki; Cecil Remmler

Edita Abdieski chronology
Z'Debü (2006)	One (2011)	On & On (2017)

Singles from One
- 1. "I've Come to Life" Released: November 12, 2010; 2. "The Key" Released: March 4, 2011

One is the debut studio album by Swiss singer Edita Abdieski. It was released through Sony Music on March 18, 2011 in German-speaking Europe, following her winning of the first season of the German version of the television music competition X Factor. Marek Pompetzki, Paul NZA, and Cecil Remmler produced most of the album, with Jörgen Elofsson and Robert Habolin also contributing.

The album earned largely mixed reviews and reached the top ten of the Swiss Albums Chart. It was preceded by lead single "I've Come to Life" which became a top ten hit in Austria and Germany. One also includes second single "The Key" as well as "The Best Thing About Me Is You," a collaboration with Puerto Rican singer Ricky Martin.

== Critical reception ==
Professional ratings
Review scores
Source	Rating
laut.de	2/5 stars

In his review for laut.de, Ulf Kubankel praised Abdieski's vocal performance on One, but criticized the overall production. He wrote that "one can only hope that [Abdieski] will be able to show on her second album of what she's really made of."

== Commercial performance ==
The album achieved moderate chart success in German-speaking Europe. It reached number 10 in Switzerland, marking its strongest performance in Abdieski's homeland. One also peaked at number 32 on the German Albums Chart and number 52 on the Austrian Albums Chart.

== Track listing ==
One track listing
No.	Title	Writer(s)	Producer(s)	Length
1.	"Give a Little Love Get a Little Love"	Ben Cullum; Laura Welsh; Maria Marcus	Marek Pompetzki; Paul NZA; Cecil Remmler	3:49
2.	"The Key"	Jörgen Elofsson; Tania Doko	Elofsson	3:18
3.	"Turn Back Time"	Peter Kvint; Sharon Vaughn	Pompetzki; NZA; Remmler	4:21
4.	"I've Come to Life"	Florian Jakob; Chris Buseck; Raphaël Schillebeeckx	Pompetzki; NZA; Remmler	3:04
5.	"Fade Away"	Hiten Bharadia; Marcus; Marlene Strand	Pompetzki; NZA; Remmler	3:38
6.	"When the Music Is Over"	William Brynildsen Reinar; Håkon Hultman Tømte; Dsign Music; Charite Viken	Pompetzki; NZA; Remmler	3:51
7.	"Someone to Lean On"	Andrea Martin; Arnthor Birgisson	Pompetzki; NZA; Remmler	4:00
8.	"I Don't Know Why"	Jayson Jaurigue; Chris Ballard; Andy Murray	Pompetzki; NZA; Remmler	3:21
9.	"Change"	Robert Habolin; Andy Love; Ben Onono; Frank Hamilton	Habolin	3:14
10.	"Wouldn't Wanna Be Without You"	Loulou Lamotte; Pelle Nylén; Sam McCarthy	Pompetzki; NZA; Remmler	3:25
11.	"I Don't Know"	Chris Breen; Torgeir Bjordal	Pompetzki; NZA; Remmler	3:38
12.	"Untouchable"	Alex Reuterskiöld; Kim Wennerström	Pompetzki; NZA; Remmler	3:20
13.	"Another Universe"	Phil Thornalley; Mads Hauge; Jon Green	Pompetzki; NZA; Remmler	3:13
14.	"Nothing's Changed"	Torgeir Bjordal; Breen	Pompetzki; NZA; Remmler	3:35
15.	"The Best Thing About Me Is You" (with Ricky Martin)	Desmond Child; Eric Bazilian; Andreas Carlsson; Martin	Child	3:38
Total length:				53:12

== Charts ==
Chart performance for One
Chart (2011)	Peak position
Austrian Albums (Ö3 Austria)	52
German Albums (Offizielle Top 100)	32
Swiss Albums (Schweizer Hitparade)	10

== Release history ==
One release history
Region	Date	Format	Label	Ref(s)
Various	18 March 2011	CD; digital download	Sony Music	
