= X Factor (German TV series) season 4 =

X Factor
- Season 4
- Hosted by: Charlotte Würdig and Bence Istenes
- Judges: Thomas Anders; Iggy Uriarte; Jennifer Weist; Sido
- Winner: EES & The Yes-Ja! Band
- Runner-up: Wait of the World

Release
- Original network: Sky 1
- Original release: 27 August – 19 October 2018

Season chronology
- ← Previous; Season 3

The fourth season of X Factor premiered on Sky 1 on August 27, 2018, and consists of a new judging line-up comprising former Modern Talking lead vocalist Thomas Anders, American singer Iggy Uriarte, singer Jennifer Weist and rapper Sido. It was presented by Charlotte Würdig and Bence Istenes, who replaced former host Jochen Schropp.

== Production ==
The show was originally cancelled in 2012 after the third series but an announcement was made for a revival series to be aired in 2018 on a new channel with an all-new judging line up and presenter. According to reports, the revival's premiere achieved only 30,000 viewers. Throughout the season, the show's viewership has been between 10,000 and 70,000 viewers. The finale only had 40,000 viewers.

The revival was shortly canceled after the final show.

== Finalists ==
Key:

– Winner
– Runner-up

Category (mentor)	Acts		
Boys (Sido)	Jan-Marten Block (23)	Leonardo Davi (20)	Robin Hoff (20)
Girls (Uriarte)	Leonie-Susanne Happel (19)	Selina Shirin Hinzmann (20)	Stefanie Black (20)
Over 25s (Anders)	Alexander Grant (30)	Manuel "Elto" El-Tohamy (29)	Sheila "Shylee" Rothberg (28)
Groups and Bands (Weist)	EES & The Yes-Ja! Band	Scheer	Wait of the World

=== Elimination Chart ===
Colour key

–	Contestant was saved by the judges
–	Contestant was saved by the public
–	Contestant was not saved by the public or by the judges and was eliminated
–	Contestant was eliminated in the Sing-off
–	Contestant became the winner

Contestant	Week 1	Week 2	Week 3
EES & The Yes-Ja! Band	Safe	Safe	Winner
Wait of the World	Safe	Saved	Runner-up
Sheila "Shylee" Rothberg	Safe	Safe	Eliminated in Round 2 (Week 3)
Jan-Marten Block	Safe	Safe	Eliminated in Round 1 (Week 3)
Scheer	Safe	Eliminated	Eliminated (week 2)
Robin Hoff	Safe	Eliminated	Eliminated (week 2)
Leonie-Susanne Hapel	Safe	Eliminated	Eliminated (week 2)
Manuel "Elto" El-Tohamy	Safe	Eliminated	Eliminated (week 2)
Selina Shirin Hinzmann	Eliminated	Eliminated (week 1)	
Stefanie Black	Eliminated	Eliminated (week 1)	
Alexander Grant	Eliminated	Eliminated (week 1)	
Leonardo Davi	Eliminated	Eliminated (week 1)	
Sing-off	—	Scheer, Wait of the World	—
Sido' vote to save	—	Scheer	—
Uriate's vote to save	—	Wait of the World	—
Weist's vote to save	—	Wait of the World	—
Anders's vote to save	—	Wait of the World	—
Eliminated	Leonardo Davi; Fewest votes to save	Scheer; 1 of 4 votes to save	Jan-Marten Block; Fewest votes to win
Eliminated	Alexander Grant; Fewest votes to save	Manuel "Elto" El-Tohamy; Fewest votes to save	Sheila "Shylee" Rothberg; Fewest votes to win
Eliminated	Stefanie Black; Fewest votes to save	Leonie-Susanne Hapel; Fewest votes to save	Waif of the World; Fewest votes to win
Eliminated	Selina Shirin Hinzmann; Fewest votes to save	Robin Hoff; Fewest votes to save	EES & The Yes-Ja! Band; Most votes to win

== Live show details ==
=== Week 1 (5 October) ===
This week the 4 acts with most votes from the public were saved while the judges chose which 4 acts to save.

Contestants' performances on the first live show
Act	Order	Song	Result
EES & The Yes-Ja! Band	1	"Never Hold Us Down" (original song)	Public vote
Alexander Grant	2	"Leave a Light On"	Eliminated
Leonie-Susanne Hapel	3	"Pretty Girl Rock"	Iggy's choice
Stefanie Black	4	"Niemals"	Eliminated
Manuel "Elto" El-Tohamy	5	"In My Blood"	Thomas' choice
Robin Hoff	6	"Schwerkraft" (original song)	Public Vote
Scheer	7	"Das mutige Ich" (original song)	Jennifer's choice
Sheila "Shylee" Rothberg	8	"Lay Me Down"	Public vote
Jan-Marten Block	9	"Unchain My Heart"	Sido's choice
Leonardo Davi	10	"Youngblood"	Eliminated
Selina Shirin Hinzmann	11	"Sandcastles"	Eliminated
Wait of the World	12	"Glacier" (original song)	Public vote

=== Week 2 (12 October) ===
The 3 acts who placed 1st, 2nd and 3rd in the public voting progressed to the final while the 2 acts who placed 4th and 5th in the public voting battled it out in the sing-off for the last place in the final while the remaining 3 acts who placed 6th, 7th and 8th in the public voting were eliminated.

Act	Order	Song	Result
Wait of the World	1	"Until your Home"	Sing-off
Jan-Marten Block	2	"Skinny Love"	Public vote
Sheila "Shylee" Rothberg	3	"Valerie"	Public vote
Scheer	4	"Unendlich"	Sing-off
Leonie-Susanne Hapel	5	"No Tears Left to Cry"	Eliminated
Manuel "Elto" El-Tohamy	6	"Thinking Out Loud"	Eliminated
Robin Hoff	7	"Facetime"	Eliminated
EES & The Yes-Ja! Band	8	"Original"	Public vote
Sing-off details
Scheer	1	"Kilometer"	Eliminated
Wait of the World	2	"You've Got the Love"	Saved

=== Week 3 Final (19 October) ===
Act	Order	First song	Order	Second song	Result
EES & The Yes-Ja! Band	1	"Just Do It"	5	"Try Try Try"	Winner
Jan-Marten Block	2	"Sanctuary"	6	"Los"	4th Place
Wait of the World	3	"Rune"	7	"Glacier"	Runner-up
Sheila "Shylee" Rothberg	4	"Chandelier"	8	"Bulletproof"	3rd Place
