= David Pfeffer =

German singer

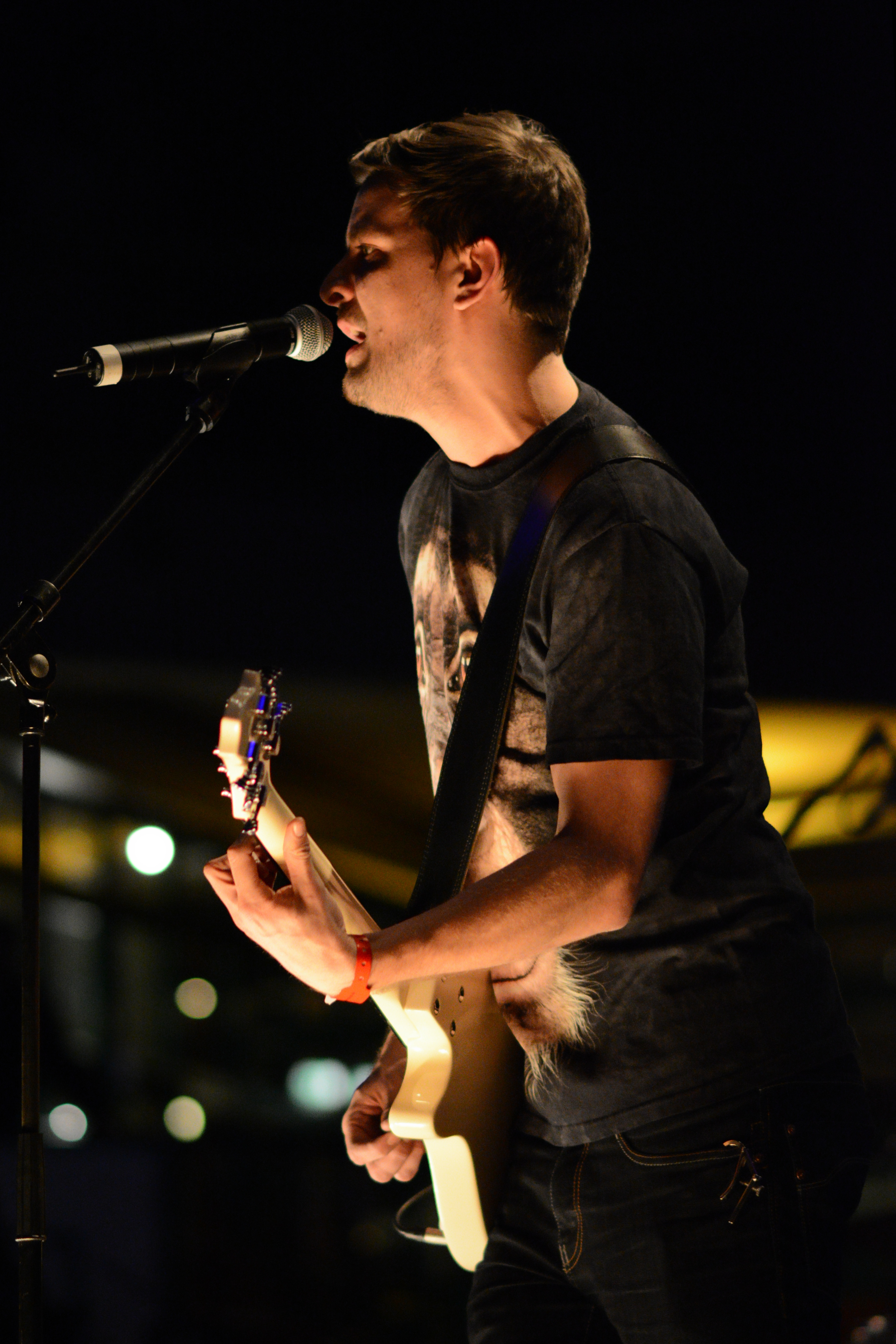
- David Pfeffer & Band at "Schüler-Rockfestival" in Wuppertal, Germany, January 2014

Background information
- Born: David Pfeffer; 11 April 1982 (age 44); Dorsten, Germany
- Genres: Pop, pop rock, alternative pop
- Occupation: Singer
- Years active: 2011–present
- Labels: Columbia, Sony
- Website: david-pfeffer.de

David Pfeffer (born 11 April 1982) is a German singer. He rose to fame during the second series of the German X Factor show, which he won in December 2011. David Pfeffer, who is also a police officer in Duisburg, Germany, released his debut album I Mind on 9 December 2011, which entered the German charts at No. 20. The album, I Mind includes Pfeffer's single "I'm Here", which also was released on the same day as the album, 9 December 2011.

== Career ==
=== 2011: X Factor ===
Pfeffer auditioned for the second series of X Factor in 2011, singing The Fray's "You Found Me". He was mentored by Till Brönner and was announced the winner on 6 December 2011, winning a record deal with Sony Music.

Episode	Song title	Original performer
Casting	"You Found Me"	The Fray
Bootcamp	"True Colors"	Cyndi Lauper
Bootcamp	"Stop Crying Your Heart Out"	Oasis
Judges' House	"The Reason"	Hoobastank
Live show 1	"Stop and Stare"	OneRepublic
Live show 2	"Use Somebody"	Kings of Leon
Live show 3	"Every Breath You Take"	The Police
Live show 4	"What Is Love"	Haddaway
Live show 5	"Nothing Compares 2 U"	The Family
Live show 6	"Valerie"	The Zutons
Live show 6	"Hometown Glory"	Adele
Live show 7	"Angel"	Sarah McLachlan
Live show 7	"Yellow"	Coldplay
Live show 8	"I'm Here"	David Pfeffer
Live show 8	"First Day of My Life" (duet with Melanie C)	Melanie C
Live show 8	"The Reason"	Hoobastank

Pfeffer's winning song, "I'm Here," was made available for download on 6 December 2011, followed by his debut album I Mind which was released three days later.

== Personal life ==
Pfeffer was born in Dorsten, North Rhine-Westphalia, Germany. He has two siblings.

== Discography ==
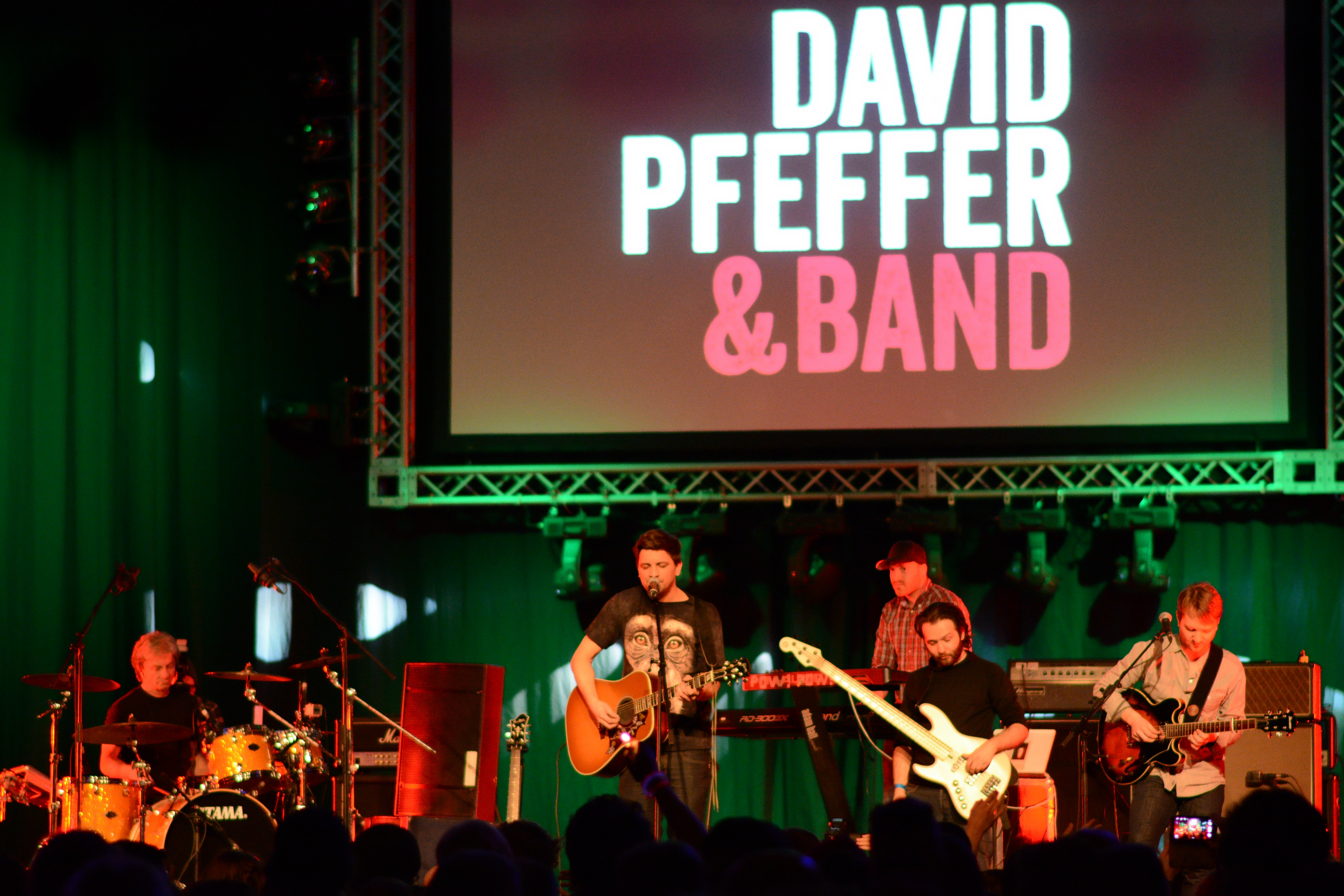
David Pfeffer & Band 2014

=== Studio albums ===
Title	Album details	Peak chart positions		
Title	Album details	GER	AUT	SWI
I Mind	Released: 9 December 2011; Label: Columbia Sony Music Germany; Formats: CD, digital download	20	54	20

=== Singles ===
Title	Year	Peak chart positions			Album
Title	Year	GER	AUT	SWI	Album
"I'm Here"	2011	10	27	12	I Mind

== See also ==
- X Factor (Germany season 2)

Preceded by Edita Abdieski	Winner of X Factor; 2011	Succeeded by Mrs. Greenbird
