= X Factor (German TV series) season 2 =

X Factor
- Season 2
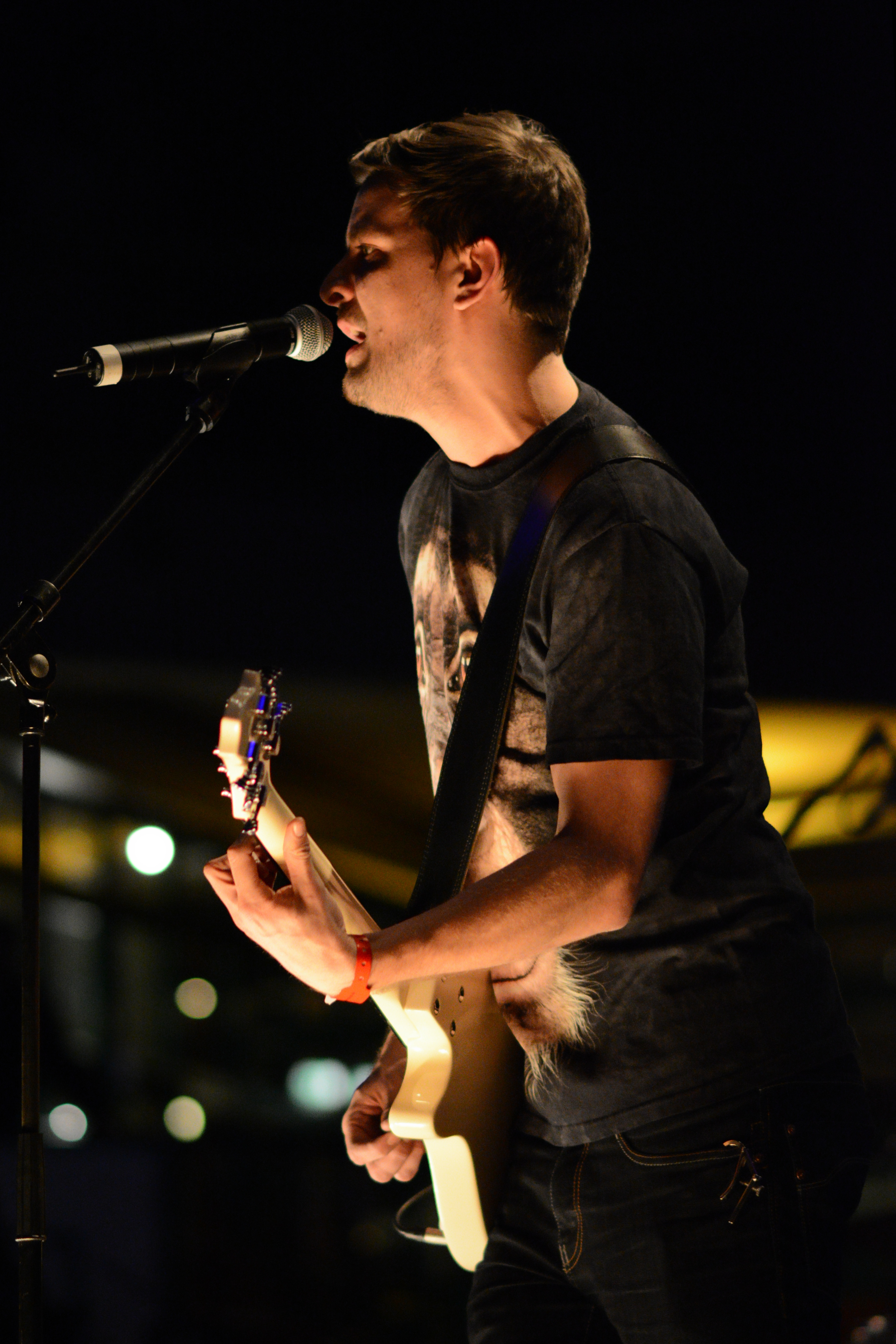
- Hosted by: Jochen Schropp
- Judges: Sarah Connor; Das Bo; Till Brönner
- Winner: David Pfeffer
- Runner-up: Raffaela Wais

Release
- Original network: VOX
- Original release: 30 August – 6 December 2011

Season chronology
- ← Previous; Season 1 Next → Season 3

The second Season of X Factor started on 30 August 2011. The auditions were held in April/May 2011. The show was broadcast every Tuesday and Sunday (only the Auditions and the Superbootcamp). The Judges were Sarah Connor, Das Bo and Till Brönner .

There were four phases:

1. Auditions
2. Bootcamp
3. Judge's House
4. Live Shows

This year twelve acts had been a part of the live shows, and not nine. Furthermore, from the first to sixth live show the judges decided which act had to leave the X Factor. In the final were three acts.

== Selection process ==
=== Applications and auditions ===
The first appeal for applicants for series 2 was broadcast during series 1 on 9 November 2010. Auditions in front of the judges for series 2 took place in Cologne, Berlin, Munich and Hamburg. After the acts sing in front of the judges, they could be eliminated or go through to the Bootcamp. The auditions were broadcast on 30 August, 4 September, 6 September, 11 September, 13 September, 18 September and 20 September 2011.

=== Superbootcamp ===
The episodes of superbootcamp were broadcast on 25 September and on 27 September 2011. It showed 150 acts attend to the superbootcamp. The acts were split into 3 groups, 16-24s, Over 25s and Groups, in which to perform at Mitsubishi Electric Halle, and each group was given one song by the judges: the 16-24s sang "Born This Way", the Over 25s sang "True Colors" and the Groups sang "Could It Be Magic". The judges then went on to cut over 80 acts, but called some soloists back, who were asked if they were interested in forming groups. All agreed and were workshopped to see which singers would work well together. They formed two groups. Then eight groups of each category were built and they fought in a battle, only one act of each duet came into the next round. Sometimes the judges end both through, but sometimes no one got through. The judges then chose the top 24 acts, based on these performances.

=== Judges' houses ===
Judges' houses, the final part of the selection process, was filmed in the summer 2011. The episodes were aired on 4 October 2011 and on 11 October. Judges were given their categories at the end of the "Superbootcamp". Brönner the Over 25s, Connor the Groups, and Das Bo the 16-24s. Mimi Müller-Westernhagen assisted Brönner in Edinburgh, Connor was accompanied by Jason Derulo in Berlin, and Das Bo received help from Melanie C in Hamburg. At judges' houses each act performed one song for their mentor and his/her guest, before the last performance, they practiced the song with their mentor and his/her guest.

The 24 acts who reached the Judges' Houses:

- Over 25: Rufus Martin, Sara Mosquera, Sven Kompaß, Gladys Mwachiti, Frederik Waldner, David Pfeffer, Mario Loritz, Volker Schlag
- 16-24: Nadir Alami, Kassim Auale, Monique Simon, Jennifer Hans, Martin Madeja, Barne Heimbucher, Sebastian Schmidt, Raffaela Wais
- Groups: Boyz II Hot, Different Alike, BenMan, Nica & Joe, High Intention, The Ord Brothers, Soultrip, Twelve Signs Up

The twelve eliminated acts were:

- Over 25: Sara Mosquera, Sven Kompaß, Frederik Waldner, Mario Loritz
- 16-24: Nadir Alami, Jennifer Hans, Barne Heimbucher, Sebastian Schmidt
- Groups: Different Alike, High Intention, The Ord Brothers, Twelve Signs Up

== Contestants ==
Key:

– Winner
– Runner-up

Category (mentor)	Acts			
16–24s (Das Bo)	Kassim Auale (20)	Martin Madeja (19)	Monique Simon (16)	Raffaela Wais (22)
25-and-overs (Brönner)	David Pfeffer (29)	Gladys Mwachiti (25)	Rufus Martin (35)	Volker Schlag (44)
Groups (Connor)	BenMan	Boyz II Hot	Nica & Joe	Soultrip

BenMan consists of Benjamin (19) & Manuel (18).
Boyz II Hot consists of Daniel (18) & Nathanaele (19).
Nica & Joe consists of Joseph (32) & Veronika (24).
Soultrip consists of Blago (24), Martin (27) & Nunzio (24).

== Results table ==
Contestants' colour key:

– Over 25s
– 16–24s
– Groups
– Bottom two or three
– Contestant was in the bottom three but received the fewest votes and was immediately eliminated
– Contestant became the Runner-Up
– Highest Vote of a Week

	Week 1	Week 2	Week 3	Week 4	Week 5	Week 6	Week 7	Week 8	
	Week 1	Week 2	Week 3	Week 4	Week 5	Week 6	Week 7	Round 1	Round 2
David Pfeffer	2nd 14.8%	1st 28.1%	1st 25.8%	1st 27.9%	1st 25.8%	1st 31.1%	1st 35.4%	1st 48.5%	Winner; 60.5%
Raffaela Wais	9th 4.5%	8th 6.0%	4th 9.2%	4th 9.6%	6th 6.9%	4th 15.8%	2nd 28.1%	2nd 25.9%	Runner-Up; 39.5%
Nica & Joe	1st 22.0%	2nd 18.8%	2nd 15.3%	3rd 14.2%	3rd 16.6%	2nd 25.3%	3rd 23.4%	3rd 25.6%	Eliminated (week 8)
Rufus Martin	5th 7.4%	5th 7.2%	3rd 12.1%	2nd 15.5%	4th 16.0%	3rd 17.9%	4th 13.1%	Eliminated (week 7)	
Monique Simon	10th 3.9%	9th 4.7%	7th 7.6%	8th 7.3%	2nd 19.4%	5th 9.9%	Eliminated (week 6)		
BenMan	8th 5.8%	4th 8.0%	6th 8.1%	5th 9.4%	5th 9.9%	Eliminated (week 5)			
Martin Madeja	3rd 12.9%	3rd 11.3%	5th 9.0%	6th 8.3%	7th 5.4%	Eliminated (week 5)			
Kassim Auale	7th 6.3%	6th 6.4%	8th 7.3%	7th 7.7%	Eliminated (week 4)				
Volker Schlag	4th 11.7%	7th 6.1%	9th 5.7%	Eliminated (week 3)					
Gladys Mwachiti	6th 6.3%	10th 3.4%	Eliminated (week 2)						
Boyz II Hot	11th 2.4%	Eliminated (week 1)							
Soultrip	12th 2.1%	Eliminated (week 1)							
Bottom two	Monique Simon, Boys II Hot	Monique Simon, Gladys Mwachiti	Kassim Auale, Volker Schlag	Kassim Auale, Monique Simon	Raffaela Wais, BenMan	Monique Simon, Raffaela Wais	No judges' vote or final showdown: public votes alone decide who is eliminated and who ultimately wins		
Brönner's vote to eliminate	Boyz II Hot	Monique Simon	Kassim Auale	Kassim Auale	BenMan	Monique Simon	No judges' vote or final showdown: public votes alone decide who is eliminated and who ultimately wins		
Connor's vote to eliminate	Monique Simon	Gladys Mwachiti	Volker Schlag	Monique Simon	Raffaela Wais	Monique Simon	No judges' vote or final showdown: public votes alone decide who is eliminated and who ultimately wins		
Das Bo's vote to eliminate	Boyz II Hot	Gladys Mwachiti	Volker Schlag	Kassim Auale	BenMan	Monique Simon	No judges' vote or final showdown: public votes alone decide who is eliminated and who ultimately wins		
Eliminated	Soultrip; 2.1% to save	Gladys Mwachiti; 2 of 3 votes	Volker Schlag; 2 of 3 votes	Kassim Auale; 2 of 3 votes	Martin Madeja; 5.4% to save	Monique Simon; 3 of 3 votes	Rufus Martin; 13.1% to save	Nica & Joe; 25.6% to win	Raffaela Wais; 39.5% to win
Eliminated	Boyz II Hot; 2 of 3 votes	Gladys Mwachiti; 2 of 3 votes	Volker Schlag; 2 of 3 votes	Kassim Auale; 2 of 3 votes	BenMan; 2 of 3 votes	Monique Simon; 3 of 3 votes	Rufus Martin; 13.1% to save	Nica & Joe; 25.6% to win	David Pfeffer; 60.5% to win

== Live show details ==
=== Week 1 (18 October) ===
- Theme: The Big Live Opening
- Special Guest: Leona Lewis ("Run")
- Group Performance: "Beautiful Day"
- Two acts were eliminated from the series first results show. The three acts with the fewest public votes were announced as the bottom three and then the act with the fewest votes was automatically eliminated. The remaining two acts then performed in the final showdown and faced the judges' votes.

Contestants' performances on the first live show
Act	Order	Song	Result
Rufus Martin	1	"Freedom"	Safe
Raffaela Wais	2	"Torn"	Safe
BenMan	3	"Fireflies"	Safe
Gladys Mwachiti	4	"California King Bed"	Safe
Monique Simon	5	"Price Tag"	Bottom three
Boyz II Hot	6	"When Will I Be Famous?"	Bottom three
Volker Schlag	7	"Halt mich"	Safe
Soultrip	8	"DJ Got Us Fallin' in Love"	Eliminated
Martin Madeja	9	"Eternity"	Safe
David Pfeffer	10	"Stop and Stare"	Safe
Kassim Auale	11	"Stay the Night"	Safe
Nica & Joe	12	"My Immortal"	Safe
Final showdown details
Act	Order	Song	Result
Monique Simon	1	"Mama Do (Uh Oh, Uh Oh)"	Safe
Boys II Hot	2	"Dance with Somebody"	Eliminated

Judge's vote to eliminate

- Brönner: Boys II Hot – said Monique has a better voice and more potential to sing
- Connor: Monique Simon – backed on her own act, Boys II Hot
- Das Bo: Boys II Hot – backed on his own act, Monique Simon

=== Week 2 (25 October) ===
- Theme: The biggest radio hits
- Special Guest: James Morrison ("I Won't Let You Go") and Madcon ("Glow" / "Freaky Like Me" / "Helluva Nite")

Contestants' performances on the second live show
Act	Order	Song	Result
Gladys Mwachiti	1	"If I Were a Boy"	Bottom two
BenMan	2	"Jessie"	Safe
Kassim Auale	3	"The Lazy Song"	Safe
Raffaela Wais	4	"Soulmate"	Safe
Rufus Martin	5	"Fly Away"	Safe
Martin Madeja	6	"New Age"	Safe
Volker Schlag	7	"Pflaster"	Safe
Nica & Joe	8	"One"	Safe
Monique Simon	9	"So What"	Bottom two
David Pfeffer	10	"Use Somebody"	Safe
Final showdown details
Act	Order	Song	Result
Monique Simon	1	"Make You Feel My Love"	Safe
Gladys Mwachiti	2	"(You Make Me Feel Like) A Natural Woman"	Eliminated

Judge's vote to eliminate

- Brönner: Monique Simon – backed his own act Gladys Mwachiti
- Connor: Gladys Mwachiti – gave no reason
- Das Bo: Gladys Mwachiti – backed his own act Monique Simon

=== Week 3 (1 November) ===
- Theme: Wild 80s
- Special Guest: Kelly Clarkson ("Mr. Know It All")
- Over 25s Group Performance: "Ain't No Sunshine"

Contestants' performances on the third live show
Act	Order	Song	Result
Monique Simon	1	"Time After Time"	Safe
Rufus Martin	2	"Kiss"	Safe
Kassim Auale	3	"Sweet Dreams (Are Made of This)"	Bottom two
BenMan	4	"Uptown Girl"	Safe
Martin Madeja	5	"Reality"	Safe
Volker Schlag	6	"Sexy"	Bottom two
Nica & Joe	7	"One Moment in Time"	Safe
David Pfeffer	8	"Every Breath You Take"	Safe
Raffaela Wais	9	"On the Radio"	Safe
Final showdown details
Act	Order	Song	Result
Kassim Auale	1	"Hey There Delilah"	Safe
Volker Schlag	2	"Ohne dich"	Eliminated

Judge's vote to eliminate

- Brönner: Kassim Auale – backed his own act Volker Schlag
- Connor: Volker Schlag – because he is the weaker singer of both acts
- Das Bo: Volker Schlag – backed his own act Kassim Auale

=== Week 4 (8 November) ===
- Theme: Party
- Special Guest: Taio Cruz ("Hangover")
- 16-24s Group Performance: "Kids"

Contestants' performances on the fourth live show
Act	Order	Song	Result
Nica & Joe	1	"When Love Takes Over"	Safe
Raffaela Wais	2	"One Love"	Safe
Kassim Auale	3	"Moves Like Jagger"	Bottom two
Rufus Martin	4	"Closer"	Safe
BenMan	5	"Stand by Me"	Safe
Monique Simon	6	"The Edge of Glory"	Bottom two
David Pfeffer	7	"What Is Love"	Safe
Martin Madeja	8	"Titanium"	Safe
Final showdown details
Act	Order	Song	Result
Monique Simon	1	"Girls Just Wanna Have Fun"	Safe
Kassim Auale	2	"Chicago"	Eliminated

Judge's vote to eliminate

- Brönner: Kassim Auale – gave no reason
- Connor: Monique Simon – because of her 3rd time in the bottom 2
- Das Bo: Kassim Auale – gave no reason

=== Week 5 (15 November) ===
- Theme: Indecent Proposal
- Special guest: Justin Bieber ("Mistletoe") / Pitbull ("Rain Over Me")
- Groups category Group Performance: "Crazy"
- Two acts were eliminated from the series fifth results show. The three acts with the fewest public votes were announced as the bottom three and then the act with the fewest votes was automatically eliminated. The remaining two acts then performed in the final showdown and faced the judges' votes.

Contestants' performances on the fifth live show
Act	Order	Song	Result
Martin Madeja	1	"Don't Speak"	Eliminated
Rufus Martin	2	"Hero"	Safe
BenMan	3	"Bleeding Love"	Bottom three
Monique Simon	4	"If I Ain't Got You"	Safe
David Pfeffer	5	"Nothing Compares 2 U"	Safe
Nica & Joe	6	"Nessun Dorma"	Safe
Raffaela Wais	7	"Tainted Love"	Bottom three
Final showdown details
Act	Order	Song	Result
Raffaela Wais	1	"I Have Nothing"	Safe
BenMan	2	"Heaven"	Eliminated

Judge's vote to eliminate

- Brönner: BenMan – said Raffaela has a better voice
- Connor: Raffaela Wais – backed on her own act, BenMan
- Das Bo: BenMan – backed on his own act, Raffaela Wais

=== Week 6 (22 November) ===
- Theme: Loud vs. Quiet
- Special Guest: Dick Brave and the Backbeats
- For the first time this series, each contestant performed two songs.

Contestants' performances on the sixth live show
Act	Order	Loud Song	Quiet Song	Result
Monique Simon	1	"Sweet About Me"	"Oh Mother"	Bottom two
David Pfeffer	2	"Valerie"	"Hometown Glory"	Safe
Rufus Martin	3	"I Wish"	"You Give Me Something"	Safe
Raffaela Wais	4	"This Love"	"Unfaithful"	Bottom two
Nica & Joe	5	"Irgendwie, irgendwo, irgendwann"	"Nothing Else Matters"	Safe
Final showdown details
Act	Order	Song		Result
Monique Simon	1	"Hurt"		Eliminated
Raffaela Wais	2	"Russian Roulette"		Safe

Judge's vote to eliminate

- Brönner: Monique Simon
- Connor: Monique Simon
- Das Bo: Monique Simon

=== Week 7 (29 November) ===
- Theme: Rock meets Soul (One song is chosen by the act and one is chosen by the mentor.)
- Special Guest: Jason Derülo ("Don't Wanna Go Home"/"It Girl") & Tim Bendzko ("Wenn Worte meine Sprache wären"/"Nur noch kurz die Welt retten")
- The act with the fewest votes was directly eliminated from the competition.

Contestants' performances on the seventh live show
Act	Order	Mentor's Choice	Act's Choice	Result
Rufus Martin	1	"It Will Rain"	"Ironic"	Eliminated
David Pfeffer	2	"Angel"	"Yellow"	Safe
Nica & Joe	3	"I Want to Know What Love Is"	"A Moment Like This"	Safe
Raffaela Wais	4	"Single Ladies (Put a Ring on It)"	"Someone Like You"	Safe

=== Week 8 (6 December) ===
- Theme: Final
- Celebrity Performers: Kelly Rowland ("Down for Whatever"), Melanie C ("Let There Be Love"), Michael Bublé ("Christmas (Baby Please Come Home)")
- Group Performance (all 12 acts): "Raise Your Glass"

Contestants' performances on the eighth live show
Act	Order	Winner's Song	Order	Celebrity Duet	Result	Order	Magic Moment	Result
David Pfeffer	1	"I'm Here"	5	"First Day of My Life" (with Melanie C)	Safe	8	"The Reason"	Winner
Nica & Joe	2	"Build a Palace"	6	"Home" (with Michael Bublé)	Eliminated	N/A		
Raffaela Wais	3	"Heaven Only Knows"	4	"When Love Takes Over" (with Kelly Rowland)	Safe	7	"Empire State of Mind"	Runner-up

- After the first elimination, Nica & Joe sang for the last time "The Prayer".

== Ratings ==
Episode	Date	Viewers		Market share	
Episode	Date	Total	14 to 49 years	Total	14 to 49 years
Audition 1	30 Aug 2011	2.04 Mio.	1.39 Mio.	7.0%	12.1%
Audition 2	4 Sep 2011	2.33 Mio.	1.61 Mio.	6.9%	10.9%
Audition 3	6 Sep 2011	2.21 Mio.	1.41 Mio.	7.2%	11.3%
Audition 4	11 Sep 2011	2.05 Mio.	1.38 Mio.	6.2%	9.6%
Audition 5	13 Sep 2011	2.14 Mio.	1.47 Mio.	7.1%	12.2%
Audition 6	18 Sep 2011	1.85 Mio.	1.16 Mio.	5.3%	7.7%
Audition 2	20 Sep 2011	2.35 Mio.	1.56 Mio.	7.8%	12.9%
Superbootcamp 1	25 Sep 2011	2.11 Mio.	1.51 Mio.	6.2%	10.6%
Superbootcamp 2	27 Sep 2011	1.97 Mio.	1.37 Mio.	6.5%	11.5%
Judge's House 1	4 Oct 2011	1.88 Mio.	1.26 Mio.	6.3%	10.3%
Judge's House 2	11 Oct 2011	1.72 Mio.	1.19 Mio.	5.3%	8.9%
Live Show 1	18 Oct 2011	1.96 Mio.	1.30 Mio.	7.2%	11.6%
Live Show 2	25 Oct 2011	1.78 Mio.	1.15 Mio.	6.0%	9.4%
Live Show 3	1 Nov 2011	1.98 Mio.	1.30 Mio.	6.6%	10.2%
Live Show 4	8 Nov 2011	2.01 Mio.	1.31 Mio.	7.1%	10.9%
Live Show 5	15 Nov 2011	1.61 Mio.	1.00 Mio.	5.3%	7.8%
Live Show 6	22 Nov 2011	1.75 Mio.	1.10 Mio.	6.2%	9.3%
Live Show 7	29 Nov 2011	1.75 Mio.	1.12 Mio.	6.2%	9.9%
Live Show 8	6 Dec 2011	1.80 Mio.	1.12 Mio.	6.9%	10.4%
