= Mrs. Greenbird =

German folk duo

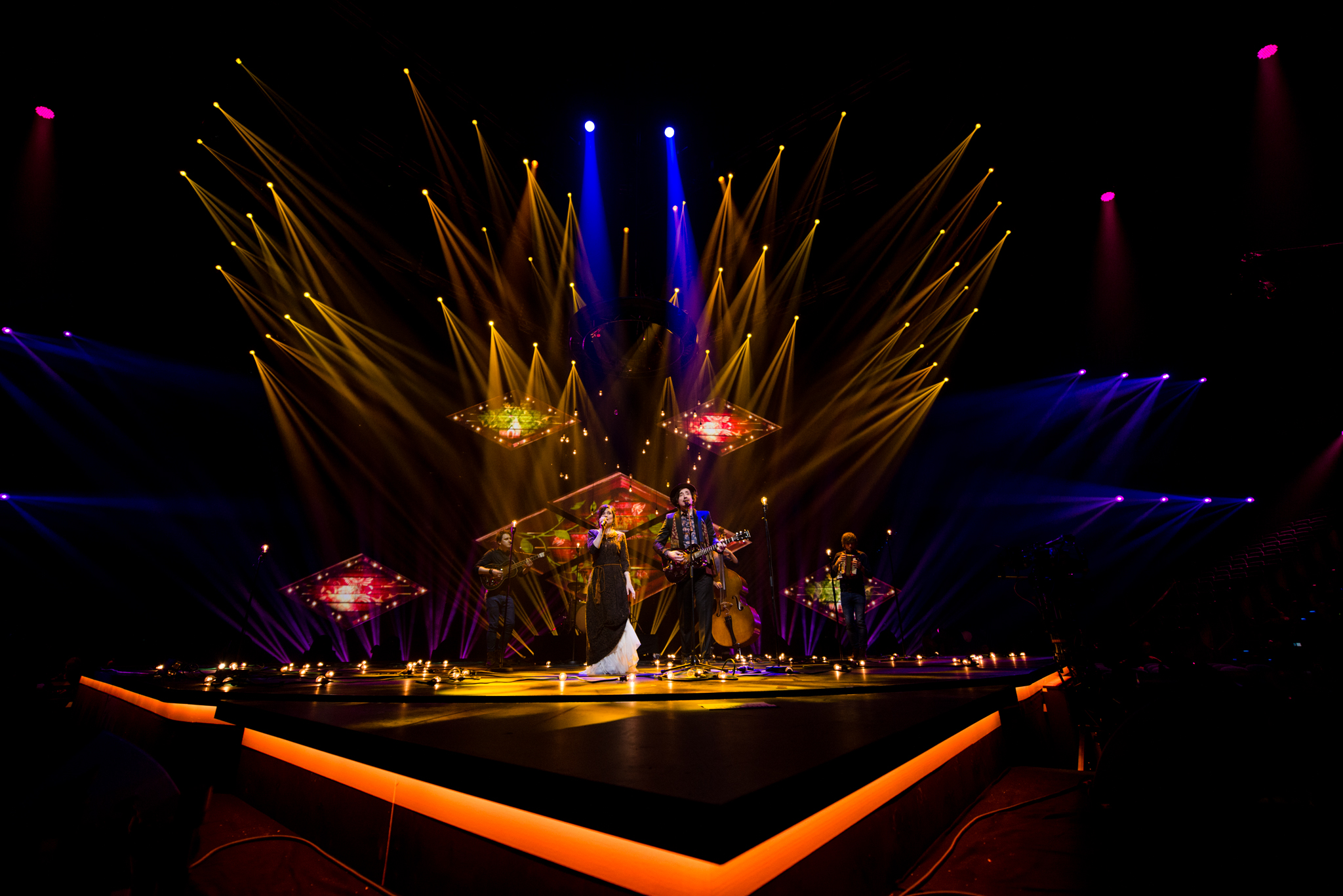
- Mrs. Greenbird at a rehearsal for Unser Song für Österreich in 2015.

Background information
- Origin: North Rhine-Westphalia, Germany
- Genres: Folk; indie folk; indie pop
- Years active: 2006–present
- Labels: Columbia; Sony
- Members: Sarah Nücken; Steffen Brückner

Mrs. Greenbird is a German folk duo consisting of Sarah Nücken and Steffen Brückner. They are best known for winning season three of the German version of The X Factor.

== Career ==
=== 2006–2012: Formation and early career ===
Nücken and Brückner met in 2006 in Cologne and formed Mrs. Greenbird. The duo originally called themselves "Goldkehlchen und der Mann mit Hut" comedically before deciding on "Mrs. Greenbird". The name comes from a dead green parrot they found at their home. At the time, Nücken was working as a singer in various choirs while Brückner worked with worship leaders at a church in Cologne. Their first major gig as a duo was the opening act for actor and musician Tim Robbins.

=== 2012–2015: X Factor and breakthrough ===
In autumn 2012, the duo participated in season three of X Factor. Throughout the show they were known for performing various songs of different genres in their folk style. Several of their covers, including "Frozen" (by Madonna) and "Blitzkrieg Bop" (by The Ramones) went on to chart in Germany and Austria. They performed an original composition "Shooting Stars & Fairy Tales" in the final round of the show and went on to win the competition. The song later charted in Germany, Austria, and Switzerland within the Top 20. On 21 December 2012 they released their début self-titled album which reached the number-one spot in Germany and Top 10 in Austria and Switzerland.

=== 2015–present: Unser Song für Österreich ===
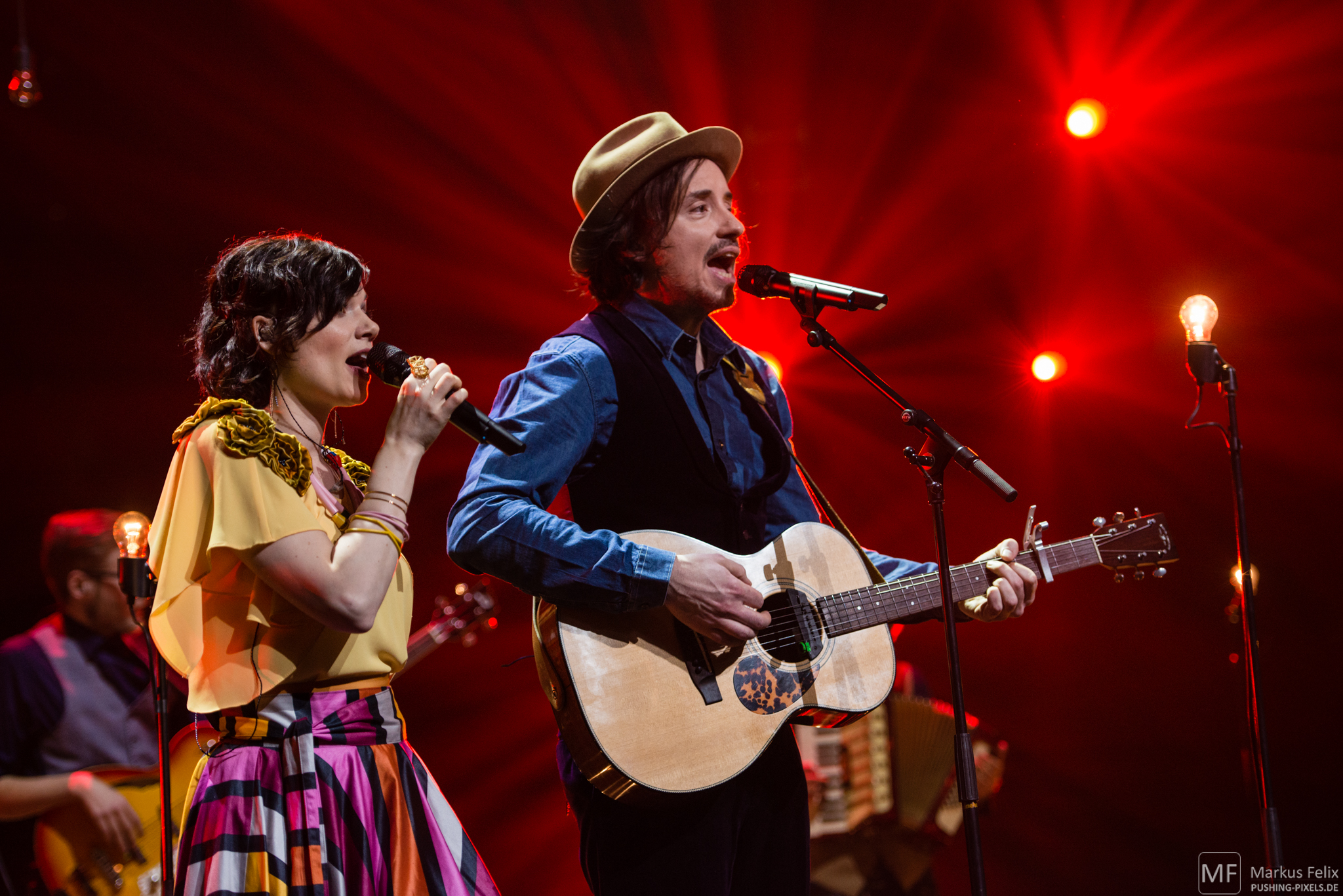
Mrs. Greenbird at a rehearsal for Unser Song für Österreich in 2015.

In January 2015, Mrs. Greenbird was revealed as one of the seven established artists taking part in Unser Song für Österreich. They competed with the songs "Shine Shine Shine" and "Take My Hand" on 5 March 2015, but did not make it to the second round of voting and were eliminated.

== Members ==
- Sarah Nücken (born 20 January 1984 (age 41) in Siegburg) – Singer, songwriter
- Steffen Brückner (born 25 March 1976 (age 49) in Kamp-Lintfort) – Guitarist, singer, songwriter

== Discography ==
=== Albums ===
List of studio albums, with selected chart positions, sales figures and certifications
Title	Album details	Peak chart positions		
Title	Album details	GER	AUT	SWI
Mrs. Greenbird	Released: 21 December 2012; Label: Columbia, Sony	1	2	9
Postcards	Released: 21 November 2014; Label: Columbia, Sony	47	—	—
Dark Waters	Released: 12 April 2019; Label: Columbia, Sony	85	—	—

=== Singles ===
List of singles as main artist, with selected chart positions and certifications
Title	Year	Peak chart positions			Certifications
Title	Year	GER	AUT	SWI	Certifications
"Blitzkrieg Bop"	2012	63	62	—	
"Frozen"	2012	92	—	—	
"Falling Slowly"	2012	97	—	—	
"It Will Never Rain Roses"	2012	54	58	—	
"Shooting Stars & Fairy Tales"	2012	14	15	16	
"One Little Heart"	2013	—	—	—	
"Everyone's the Same"	2014	—	—	—	
"Shine Shine Shine"	2015	—	—	—	
"Take My Hand"	2015	—	—	—	

Preceded by David Pfeffer	X Factor (Germany); Winner; 2012	Succeeded by Incumbent
