= X Factor (German TV series) season 3 =

X Factor
- Season 3
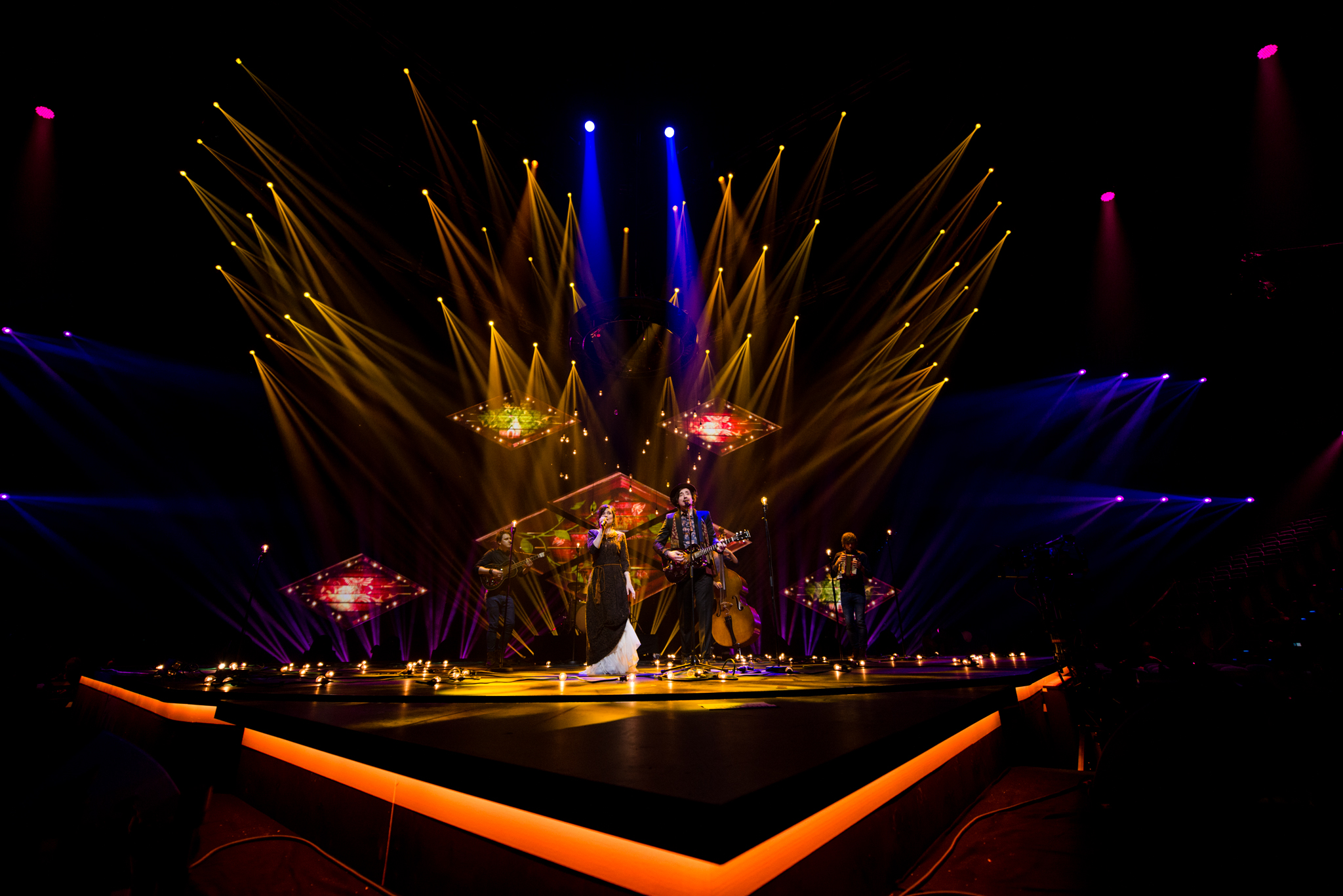
- Hosted by: Jochen Schropp
- Judges: Sarah Connor; H.P. Baxxter; Sandra Nasic; Moses Pelham
- Winner: Mrs. Greenbird
- Runner-up: Melissa Heiduk

Release
- Original network: VOX; Kick-off show on RTL
- Original release: 25 August – 25 November 2012

Season chronology
- ← Previous; Season 2 Next → Season 4

The third Season of X Factor started on 25 August 2012. The auditions were held in April/May 2012. The show was broadcast every Sunday. The judges were Sarah Connor, H.P. Baxxter, Sandra Nasic and Moses Pelham. In October 2012 Connor announced that she would not return to the judging panel for the Fourth Season.

There were four phases: 1. Auditions 2. Bootcamp 3. Judge's House 4. Live Shows

This year twelve acts had been a part of the live shows, but not in 3 categories like the two seasons before. In season 3 there were four categories. This year only the viewers voted who will go through. There wouldn't be a final showdown. The Live shows were cut to four, instead of eight.

== Selection process ==
=== Applications and auditions ===
The first appeal for applicants for series 3 was broadcast during series 2 on 6 December 2012. Auditions in front of the judges for series 3 took place in Cologne, Berlin, Munich and Hamburg. After the acts sing in front of the judges, they would be eliminated or go through to the Bootcamp, but they need 3 of 4 votes to get through. The first audition was broadcast on 25 August 2012 on RTL Television. The rest aired on VOX every Sunday.

=== Bootcamp ===
The episodes of Bootcamp were broadcast in September 2012. It showed 92 acts attend to the Bootcamp. The acts were split into 4 groups, Boys, Girls, Over 25s and Groups and Bands, in which to perform in Düsseldorf. At first the 92 acts were reduced to the last 48, after a one-minute performance. The second phase was a duel where two acts of a category had to perform the same song and after this the judges decided which act got through to the Judges' House. The boys category had only five acts because both acts of one battle were send home and two of the girls category (Loredana Giarraputo & Klementine Hendrichs) have to repeat the battle in the judges house because the judges couldn't decided.

The 24 acts who reached the Judges' Houses:

- Boys: Richard Geldner, Aron Verfinger, Lavien Partawie, Barne Heimbucher, Andrew Fischer
- Girls: Lisa Aberer, Alexia Drawhorn, Fabienne Bender, Melissa Heiduk, Anna Hodowaniec, Loredana Giarraputo, Klementine Hendrichs
- Over 25s: Colin Rich, Sascha Miskovic, Joey Jobbagy, Janine Smith, Björn Paulsen, Willy Hubbard
- Groups and Bands: Mrs. Greenbird, Rune, Swave, aVid*, Josephine, Die Mayers

=== Judges' houses ===
Judges' houses, the final part of the selection process, was filmed in summer 2012. The episodes aired in October 2012. Judges decided alone which categories they want to get, so at the end of the Bootcamp they discussed their favourites. Baxxter the Girls, Nasic the Groups and Bands, Connor the Over 25s, and Pelham the Boys. At judges' houses each act performed one song for their mentor and his/her guest, before the last performance, they practiced the song with their mentor and his/her guest.

The twelve eliminated acts were:

- Boys: Lavien Partawie, Aron Verfinger
- Girls: Loredana Giarraputo, Fabienne Bender, Anna Hodowaniec, Alexia Drawhorn
- Over 25s: Joey Jobbagy, Janine Smith, Sascha Miskovic
- Groups and Bands: aVid*, Die Mayers, Swave

== Contestants ==
Key:

– Winner
– Runner-up

Category (mentor)	Acts		
Boys (Pelham)	Andrew Fischer (21)	Barne Heimbucher (20)	Richard Geldner (24)
Girls (Baxxter)	Klementine Hendrichs (23)	Lisa Aberer (19)	Melissa Heiduk (23)
Over 25s (Connor)	Björn Paulsen (27)	Colin Rich (40)	Willy Hubbard (31)
Groups and Bands (Nasic)	Josephine	Mrs. Greenbird	Rune

Josephine consists of Christian (29), Daniel (33), Imme (30) & Victor (22).
Mrs. Greenbird consists of Sarah (28) & Steffen (36).
Rune consists of Marvin (18), Patrick (20), Sebastian (22) & Steffen (20).

== Results table ==
Contestants' colour key:

– Boys
– Girls
– Over 25s
– Groups and Bands
– Act did not perform
– the act got the fewest votes (per category) and leave the competition
– the act got the fewest votes and has to sing again in the final showdown
– Contestant became the Runner-Up
– Highest (per category) Vote of a Week

	Week 1				Week 2				Week 3		Week 4	
	Over 25s	Girls	Boys	Groups and Bands	Boys	Over 25s	Girls	Groups and Bands	Round 1	Round 2	Round 1	Round 2
Mrs. Greenbird	—N/a	—N/a	—N/a	1st 63.16%	—N/a	—N/a	—N/a	1st 86.08%	1st 44.46%	—N/a	1st 54.49%	1st 61.78%
Melissa Heiduk	—N/a	1st 60.92%	—N/a	—N/a	—N/a	—N/a	1st 56.69%	—N/a	2nd 19.57%	—N/a	2nd 27.92%	Runner-Up; 38.22%
Björn Paulsen	1st 40.19%	—N/a	—N/a	—N/a	—N/a	1st 60.23%	—N/a	—N/a	3rd 18.51%	1st 54.88%	3rd 17.59%	Eliminated (week 4)
Barne Heimbucher	—N/a	—N/a	2nd 27.81%	—N/a	1st 59.55%	—N/a	—N/a	—N/a	4th 17.46%	2nd 45.12%	Eliminated (week 3)	
Rune	—N/a	—N/a	—N/a	2nd 19.83%	—N/a	—N/a	—N/a	2nd 13.92%	Eliminated (week 2)			
Klementine Hendrichs	—N/a	2nd 21.77%	—N/a	—N/a	—N/a	—N/a	2nd 43.31%	Eliminated (week 2)				
Willy Hubbard	2nd 39.08%	—N/a	—N/a	—N/a	—N/a	2nd 39.77%	Eliminated (week 2)					
Richard Geldner	—N/a	—N/a	1st 49.93%	—N/a	2nd 40.45%	Eliminated (week 2)						
Josephine	—N/a	—N/a	—N/a	3rd 17.01%	Eliminated (week 1)							
Andrew Fischer	—N/a	—N/a	3rd 22.26%	Eliminated (week 1)								
Lisa Aberer	—N/a	3rd 17.31%	Eliminated (week 1)									
Colin Rich	3rd 20.73%	Eliminated (week 1)										
Eliminated	Colin Rich; 20.73% to save	Lisa Aberer; 17.31% to save	Andrew Fischer; 22.26% to save	Josephine; 17.01% to save	Richard Geldner; 40.45% to save	Willy Hubbard; 39.77% to save	Klementine Hendrichs; 43.31% to save	Rune; 13.92% to save	Barne Heimbucher; 45.12% to save		Björn Paulsen; 17.95% to win	Melissa Heiduk; 38.22% to win
Eliminated	Colin Rich; 20.73% to save	Lisa Aberer; 17.31% to save	Andrew Fischer; 22.26% to save	Josephine; 17.01% to save	Richard Geldner; 40.45% to save	Willy Hubbard; 39.77% to save	Klementine Hendrichs; 43.31% to save	Rune; 13.92% to save	Barne Heimbucher; 45.12% to save		Björn Paulsen; 17.95% to win	Mrs. Greenbird; 61.78% to win

== Live show details ==
=== Week 1 (4 November) ===
Contestants' performances on the first live show
Act	Order	Song	Result
Willy Hubbard	1	"With a Little Help from My Friends"	Safe
Colin Rich	2	"Breakeven"	Eliminated
Björn Paulsen	3	"Ich lieb dich überhaupt nicht mehr"	Safe
Lisa Aberer	4	"She Wolf (Falling to Pieces)"	Eliminated
Klementine Hendrichs	5	"Give It to Me Right"	Safe
Melissa Heiduk	6	"Something's Got a Hold on Me"	Safe
Andrew Fischer	7	"Still"	Eliminated
Barne Heimbucher	8	"Ain't Nobody"	Safe
Richard Geldner	9	"Eisberg"	Safe
Josephine	10	"Leuchtturm"	Eliminated
Mrs. Greenbird	11	"Blitzkrieg Bop"	Safe
Rune	12	"We Found Love"	Safe

=== Week 2 (11 November) ===
Contestants' performances on the second live show
Act	Order	Song	Result
Richard Geldner	1	"Bleibt alles anders"	Eliminated
Barne Heimbucher	2	"Lila Wolken"	Safe
Willy Hubbard	3	"Ordinary People"	Eliminated
Björn Paulsen	4	"Königin"	Safe
Klementine Hendrichs	5	"Yeah Right"	Eliminated
Melissa Heiduk	6	"Roxanne"	Safe
Rune	7	"Mirrors"	Eliminated
Mrs Greenbird	8	"Frozen"	Safe

=== Week 3: Semi-final (18 November) ===
- The two acts with the fewest votes had to sing again in the final showdown. Then the public decided between this two acts and the act with the lowest numbers of votes was eliminated.

Contestants' performances on the third live show
Act	Order	Song 1	Song 2	Result
Melissa Heiduk	1	"Free"	"Sky and Sand"	Safe
Barne Heimbucher	2	"Wonderful Life"	"Frei sein"	Bottom two
Björn Paulsen	3	"Augen schließen"	"Herzen im Takt"	Bottom two
Mrs. Greenbird	4	"Falling Slowly"	"It Will Never Rain Roses"	Safe
Act	Order	Song		Result
Barne Heimbucher	1	"Just a Dream"		Eliminated
Björn Paulsen	2	"360 Grad Heimat"		Safe

=== Week 4: Final (25 November) ===
- The finalists performed three songs and one of them would be a performance with a celebrity musician.

Contestants' performances on the final fourth live show
Act	Order	Magic Moment	Song (Duet with a celebrity)	Winner's Single	Result
Björn Paulsen	1	"Chicago"	"Fallschirm" (MIA.)	N/A	Eliminated
Melissa Heiduk	2	"Breathe Easy"	"Closer" (Ne-Yo)	"Send Me An Angel"	Runner-Up
Mrs. Greenbird	3	"You're the One That I Want"	"Ironic"(Alanis Morissette)	"Shooting Stars & Fairy Tales"	Winner

== Ratings ==
Episode	Date	Viewers		Market share	
Episode	Date	Total	14 to 49 years	Total	14 to 49 years
Audition 1	25 Aug 2012 (on RTL)	1.93 Mio.	1.20 Mio.	7.5%	13.5%
Audition 2	26 Aug 2012	1.97 Mio.	1.32 Mio.	5.9%	9.6%
Audition 3	2 Sep 2012	1.76 Mio.	1.22 Mio.	5.6%	9.3%
Audition 4	9 Sep 2012	1.98 Mio.	1.37 Mio.	6.4%	10.7%
Audition 5	16 Sep 2012	1.91 Mio.	1.31 Mio.	6.0%	9.8%
Audition 6	23 Sep 2012	1.88 Mio.	1.29 Mio.	5.8%	9.6%
Bootcamp 1	30 Sep 2012	1.60 Mio.	1.05 Mio.	5.1%	8.0%
Bootcamp 2	7 Oct 2012	1.82 Mio.	1.19 Mio.	5.5%	8.6%
Judge's House 1	14 Oct 2012	1.26 Mio.	0.82 Mio.	3.7%	5.6%
Judge's House 2	21 Oct 2012	1.54 Mio.	0.99 Mio.	4.6%	7.0%
Judge's House 3	28 Oct 2012	1.23 Mio.	0.77 Mio.	3.9%	5.5%
Live Show 1	4 Nov 2012	1.57 Mio.	1.03 Mio.	4.9%	7.6%
Live Show 2	11 Nov 2012	1,30 Mio.	0.91 Mio.	4.1%	5.8%
Live Show 3	18 Nov 2012	1,12 Mio.	0.79 Mio.	3.8%	6.1%
Live Show 4	25 Nov 2012	1.25 Mio.	0.96 Mio.	4.2%	5.9%
