= Mathia-Mathithiahu Gavriel =

Israeli musical artist

Mati Gavriel מאטי גבריאל
- Born: Mathia-Mathithiahu Gavriel; January 14, 1986 (age 40); Tel Aviv, Israel
- Origin: Israel and Germany
- Genres: Pop, Classical, Indie, Alternative
- Occupations: Composer, Music Producer, Songwriter, Arranger
- Instruments: Vocals, Piano, Guitar, Bass, Drums, Percussion, Ukulele, Programming
- Labels: Warner, Sony, Universal, Spinnin', Ultra

Mati Gavriel (birth name Mathia-Mathithiahu Gavriel, Hebrew: מתיה-מתתיהו גבריאל; born January 14, 1986, in Tel Aviv, Israel) is a German-Israeli composer, record producer, musician, and singer. He is also known as Mathia Gavriel, Mati Moon, or MLDY, and currently resides between Los Angeles and New York City.

== Early life ==
Mathia-Mathithiahu Gavriel was born in Tel Aviv, Israel to an Italian-Jewish/Greek-Jewish father and a German mother. He then moved to Germany when he was six years old. When he was 18, he moved to London, where he studied sound engineering. Gavriel then moved to Berlin in 2006 to pursue a career in music. He resides between Los Angeles and New York City, and works on various projects.

== Career ==
From August to November 2010, Gavriel participated in the first season of X Factor. He reached the semi-finals and finally finished third. The jury consisted of Sarah Connor, who was also Gavriel's mentor, Till Brönner, and George Glueck.

His music has been featured in art installations at the Tate Modern, the Museum of Modern Art, and Frieze Art Fair. In addition, he has collaborated with Belgian-American artist Cécile B. Evans for over a decade, including supplying music for her art installations.

Gavriel has been on tour with many notable bands, including Adel Tawil, Aviv Geffen, Porcupine Tree, and the Paper Aeroplanes.

Gavriel founded Miracle Record, a music production and licensing agency for music for brands in Los Angeles. Miracle Record is a LA, New York and Berlin-based music production house, composing and producing original music for advertisements, television, film, and radio. Over the last few years Miracle Record has produced music for s.Oliver, Garnier, Syoss, T-Mobile, Volkswagen, Microsoft, Mercedes-Benz, Siemens, and many more.

Gavriel has arranged and produced a classical recording of the song “You Can’t Always Get What You Want” by the Rolling Stones which was used for the T-Mobile campaign in Germany. It was recorded at the Teldex Studio in Berlin with an orchestra.

He also co-founded a company called SONGYFT.

== Projects ==
In 2017, Gavriel released an experimental piano album called Planets. The album includes a composition for each of the planets.

Moon & Star was produced and recorded by Gavriel and Jenny Karr in Los Angeles. It is a mix between lofi, alternative, and indie genres.

Together with MLDY, Gavriel has also produced electronic music featuring different artists, including remixes.

== Discography ==
Selected discography:

- Mathia – On The Run
- Mathia – Planets
- Moon & Star – Forever
- MLDY – On With You
