= George Glueck =

Romanian-born music producer and artist manager

George Glueck (born June 28, 1950) is a music producer and artist manager.

Glueck was born in Oradea, Romania, and grew up in New York City. In 1975, he went to Berlin, working with music publisher Peter Meisel, who in 1964 founded the first German independent label.

Glueck worked with Falco, Trio, the Rainbirds, Die Prinzen, Inga and Annette Humpe and Rio Reiser. He also was CEO of the record label X-Cell Records and Sing Sing Records. The label X-Cell Records, founded by Glueck in 1998, is now part of Universal Music Group, after being a BMG joint venture partner earlier in 2007.

In 2010, he was assigned as one of three judges for the German version of X Factor, alongside Sarah Connor and Till Brönner.
