= EES (rapper) =

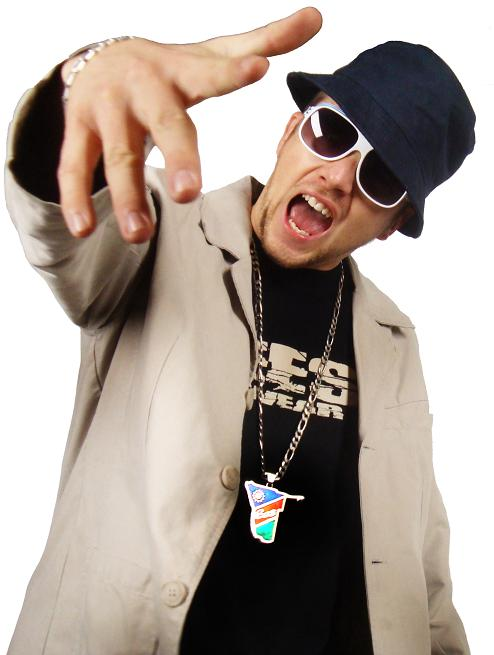

Background information
- Born: Eric Sell; 5 October 1983 (age 43); Windhoek, South West Africa
- Origin: Windhoek, Namibia
- Genres: Hip hop, Kwaito
- Occupation: Singer
- Years active: 2000–present
- Label: NAM FLAVA MUSIC / EES Records
- Website: eesy-ees.com

Eric Sell, better known as EES (also: eesy-ees/EeS/EeS, "Easy Eric Sell"), is a German Namibian Kwaito artist and rapper.

== Personal life and career ==
Sell was born in Windhoek on 5 October 1983. He currently lives both in Windhoek, Namibia's capital, and Cologne, Germany. His texts are written in a mixture of Afrikaans and English. He also makes frequent use of Namlish and Namibian German (Südwesterdeutsch), the German dialect spoken in Namibia, and he popularised the term "Nam-Slang" for it.

On 7 November 2024, Sell released the song One, which he submitted to represent Germany in the Eurovision Song Contest 2025.

== Awards ==
=== Won ===
- 2008 Sanlam NBC Music Awards: Best Rock/Alternative Artist
- 2009 MTV Africa Music Awards: Listener Choice Award
- 2009 Namibian Music Awards: Artist of the Year
- 2011 Namibian Annual Music Awards: Best international achievement
- 2012 Namibian Annual Music Awards: Best Music Video & Best Collaboration
- 2012 Channel O Music Video Awards: Best Kwaito Video ("Ayoba" with Mandoza)

== Discography ==
=== Studio albums ===
Title	Year
Nam Flava	2006
Sharp, Sharp!	2007
Awee'!	2008
Megaphone Ghazzie	2011
The Remixes (Raw & Unmastered)	2012
If Not, Why Not!	2013
Authentic Rebel	2014
Game Changer	2021
Instrumentals	2023
Good Vibes Only	2023

=== EPs ===
Title	Year
Your Sister	2021

=== Singles ===
Title	Year	Album
"Salutation - The Vuvuzela-Song"	2010	Non-album singles
"Again 'N Again"	2010	Non-album singles
"Satisfaction"	2012	If Not, Why Not!
"Feel the Sun" (with Matthias Baer)	2012	If Not, Why Not!
"10 Backz" (with T-Zon)	2012	Non-album single
"I Don't Care" (with Jack Parow)	2012	If Not, Why Not!
"Meine Cherrie" (with T-Zon and LIONT)	2012	Non-album single
"Woza December" (with M-Poser)	2012	Authentic Rebel
"Bafana Soul" (with Milanic)	2014	Non-album singles
"Yeye" (with HanSolo)	2015	Non-album singles
"Nu Day (Remix)" (with Ktk)	2015	Non-album singles
"Just Do It"	2015	Non-album singles
"On The Road Again"	2016	Non-album singles
"Deise Nam Boys" (with Manni$)	2016	Non-album singles
"Here Right Now"	2016	Non-album singles
"Sundowner" (with The Hunta)	2017	Non-album singles
"Original"	2017	Non-album singles
"Roadtrip" (with Famaz Attak)	2017	Non-album singles
"Feeling Alright"	2018	Non-album singles
"Gimme That" (with Amazonkies)	2018	Non-album singles
"Oldschool" (with Luxus Lütte)	2018	Non-album singles
"Try Try Try"	2018	Non-album singles
"Lass uns Chillen"	2019	Good Vibes Only
"Mama" (with Franz Funke and Gideon Glock)	2019	Non-album singles
"You Know Me" (with Syndicate and Jericho)	2020	Non-album singles
"The One" (with ML)	2020	Non-album singles
"Bad Neighbours" (with House Guru Gang)	2020	Game Changer
"Magic"	2020	Non-album singles
"Relax - Remix" (with Amazonkies)	2020	Non-album singles
"Chooser"	2021	Non-album singles
"Ok!" (with Crew10)	2021	Non-album singles
"Hunt Like a Lion" (with Lioness)	2021	Game Changer
"100"	2021	Game Changer
"1 X 1"	2021	Game Changer
"Best Combination"	2021	Game Changer
"Jagga Jagga"	2021	Game Changer
"Chille Deine Guava" (with The Hunta)	2021	Good Vibes Only
"When We Unite" (with TopCheri)	2022	Non-album single
"Wenn der Beat dropped!"	2022	Good Vibes Only
"Eyo (Wake Up)"	2022	Non-album singles
"Girlfriend" (with Oteya)	2023	Non-album singles
"Hey Mami (Remix)" (with Space and ESB)	2023	Non-album singles
"Meine Songs" (with Pesh)	2023	Good Vibes Only
"Good Vibes Only"	2023	Good Vibes Only
"Nur Du!" (with Jazzy Gudd)	2023	Good Vibes Only
"One"	2024	Non-album single

== Films and books ==
- The Kwaito-Documentary
- Esisallesoreidt (approximately: EverythingIsAllRight), a humorous dictionary Südwesterdeutsch–German
