= X Factor (German TV series) =

- Created by: Simon Cowell
- Presented by: Jochen Schropp (Season 1-3); Janine Reinhardt (Season 2); Istenes Bence (Season 4); Charlotte Würdig (Season 4)
- Judges: Current; Thomas Anders (Season 4); Sido (Season 4); Iggy Uriarte (Season 4); Jennifer Weist (Season 4); Former; Till Brönner (Season 1-2); Sarah Connor (Season 1-3); George Glueck (Season 1); Das Bo(Season 2); H.P. Baxxter(Season 3); Sandra Nasic(Season 3); Moses Pelham(Season 3)
- Country of origin: Germany
- Original language: German
- No. of seasons: 4

Original release
- Network: VOX; RTL; Sky 1
- Release: 20 August 2010 – 19 October 2018

X Factor is the German version of The X Factor, a show originating from the United Kingdom. It is a television music talent show contested by aspiring pop singers drawn from public auditions.

The show's inaugural German season started in August 2010. RTL broadcast the first two kick-off shows. The other episodes have been shown on VOX. Both channels are part of Mediengruppe RTL Deutschland. The seasons 1-3 of X Factor were produced by Grundy Light Entertainment, another RTL Group company. Season 4 is produced by UFA Show & Factual by Sky.

The auditions for the first season were held in April 2010. The show started on 20 August 2010 and ended on 9 November 2010 with Edita Abdieski being crowned the winner. The second season began on 30 August 2011 and concluded in November and was won by David Pfeffer. The third season began on 25 August 2012 and was won by Mrs Greenbird on 25 November 2012.

The show was cancelled after the third season in 2012 before eventually being announced for a revival in 2018 on its new home channel, Sky Deutschland. It premiered on 27 August 2018 on Sky 1.

On 7 December 2018, Sky 1 cancelled the series after one season.

== Series summary ==
"Boys" category
"Girls" category
"Over 25s" category
"Groups and Bands" category
"16-24s" category

Season	Air date	Winner	Runner-up	Host(s)	Judges	Winning mentor	Network
One	2010	Edita Abdieski	Big Soul	Jochen Schropp	Till Brönner; Sarah Connor; George Glueck	Till Brönner	VOX; RTL
Two	2011	David Pfeffer	Raffaela WAIS	Jochen Schropp	Till Brönner; Sarah Connor; Das Bo	Till Brönner	VOX; RTL
Three	2012	Mrs. Greenbird	Melissa Heiduk	Jochen Schropp	Sarah Connor; H.P. Baxxter; Sandra Nasic; Moses Pelham	Sandra Nasic	VOX; RTL
Four	2018	EES & The Yes-Ja! Band	Wait of the World	Charlotte Würdig; Bence Istenes	Thomas Anders; Sido; Iggy Uriarte; Jennifer Weist	Jennifer Weist	Sky

== Judges' categories and their contestants ==
In each season, each judge is allocated a category to mentor and chooses three acts to progress to the live shows. This table shows, for each season, which category each judge was allocated and which acts he or she put through to the live shows.

– Winning judge/category. Winners are in bold, eliminated contestants in small font.

Season	George Glueck	Sarah Connor	Till Brönner	N/A
**One**	**Groups/Bands**; Big Soul; Urban Candy; LaFamille	**16-24s** Mati Gavriel; Marlon Bertzbach; Pino Severino	**Over 25s** **Edita Abdieski**; Anthony Thet; Meral Al-Mer	N/A
Season	Das Bo	Sarah Connor	Till Brönner	N/A
**Two**	**16-24s** Raffaela Wais; Monique Simon; Martin Madeja; Kassim Auale	**Groups/Bands**; Nica & Joe; BenMan; Boyz II Hot; Soultrip	**Over 25s** **David Pfeffer**; Rufus Martin; Volker Schlag; Gladys Mwachiti	N/A
Season	Moses Pelham	Sarah Connor	H.P. Baxxter	Sandra Nasic
**Three**	**Boys**; Barne Heimbucher; Richard Geldner; Andrew Fischer	**Over 25s** Björn Paulsen; Willy Hubbard; Colin Rich	**Girls**; Melissa Heiduk; Klementine Hendrichs; Lisa Aberer	**Groups/Bands**; **Mrs. Greenbird**; Rune; Josephine
Season	Thomas Anders	Jennifer Weist	Iggy Uriarte	Sido
**Four**	**Over 25s** Sheila "Shylee" Rothberg; Manuel "Elto" El-Tohamy; Alexander Grant	**Groups/Bands**; **EES & The Yes-Ja! Band**; Wait of the World; Scheer	**Girls**; Leonie-Susanne Happel; Selina Shirin Hinzmann; Stefanie Black	**Boys**; Jan-Marten Block; Robin Hoff; Leonardo Davi

== Season 1 (2010) ==
The first Season started in 2010. The auditions were held in April 2010. The first show started on 20 August 2010. The Judges were Sarah Connor (-25), George Glueck (Groups), and Till Brönner (25+).

There are four phases:

1. Auditions
2. Bootcamp
3. Judge's House
4. Live Shows

=== Contestants ===
The live shows commenced on 21 September 2010. The following artists made it to the live shows. Ages are as of the date of the show (2010).

Key:

– Winner
– Runner-up

Category (mentor)	Acts		
16-24s (Connor)	Marlon Bertzbach (18)	Mati Gavriel (24)	Pino Severino (18)
Over 25s (Brönner)	Anthony Thet (30)	Edita Abdieski (25)	Meral Al-Mer (29)
Groups (Glueck)	Big Soul	LaFamille	Urban Candy

- Big Soul consists of Nadine (28), Alexandra (33), Martina (33), and Michelle (35)
- LaFamille consists of Joel (35), Erkan (32), and Guido (31)
- Urban Candy consists of Roman (26), Marc (24), and Candy (25)

== Season 2 (2011) ==
The second Season started on 30 August 2011. The auditions were held in April/May 2011. The Show was broadcast every Tuesday and Sunday. The Judges were Sarah Connor, Das Bo and Till Brönner. That year twelve acts were a part of the live shows, and not nine. Furthermore, from the first to ninth live show the judges decided which act had to leave the X Factor.

=== Contestants ===
Key:

– Winner
– Runner-up

Category (mentor)	Acts			
16-24s (Das Bo)	Kassim Auale (20)	Martin Madeja (19)	Monique Simon (16)	Raffaela Wais (22)
Over 25s (Brönner)	David Pfeffer (29)	Gladys Mwachiti (25)	Rufus Martin (35)	Volker Schlag (44)
Groups (Connor)	BenMan	Boyz II Hot	Nica & Joe	Soultrip

BenMan consists of Benjamin (19) & Manuel (18).
Boyz II Hot consists of Daniel (18) & Nathanaele (19).
Nica & Joe consists of Joseph (31) & Veronika (24).
Soultrip consists of Blago (24), Martin (27) & Nunzio (24).

== Season 3 (2012) ==
The third Season started on 25 August 2012. The auditions were held in April/May 2012. The Show was broadcast every Sunday. The first show was broadcast at RTL. The Judges were Sarah Connor, H.P. Baxxter, Sandra Nasic and Moses Pelham. That year twelve acts were a part of the live shows, split into four categories: Boys, Girls, Over 25s and Groups within Bands. Since this year only the public decided who would be eliminated, so there was no longer a final showdown where the judges could save an act.

=== Contestants ===
Key:

– Winner
– Runner-up
– Third Place

Category (mentor)	Acts		
Boys (Pelham)	Andrew Fischer (21)	Barne Heimbucher (20)	Richard Geldner (24)
Girls (Baxxter)	Klementine Hendrichs (23)	Lisa Aberer (19)	Melissa Heiduk (23)
Over 25s (Connor)	Björn Paulsen (27)	Colin Rich (40)	Willy Hubbard (31)
Groups and Bands (Nasic)	Josephine	Mrs. Greenbird	Rune

Josephine consists of Christian (29), Daniel (33), Imme (30) & Victor (22).
Mrs. Greenbird consists of Sarah (28) & Steffen (36).
Rune consists of Marvin (18), Patrick (20), Sebastian (22) & Steffen (20).

== Season 4 (2018) ==
The fourth season of X Factor premiered on Sky 1 on 27 August 2018 and consists of a new judging line-up comprising former Modern Talking lead vocalist Thomas Anders, German-born Chilean singer Iggy Uriarte, singer Jennifer Weist and rapper Sido It is presented by Charlotte Würdig and Bence Istenes, who replaced former host Jochen Schropp.

There are three phases:

1. Auditions
2. Chair Challenge
3. Live Shows

=== Contestants ===
Key:

– Winner
– Runner-up
– Third place

Category (mentor)	Acts		
Boys (Sido)	Jan-Marten Block (23)	Leonardo Davi (20)	Robin Hoff (20)
Girls (Uriarte)	Leonie-Susanne Happel (19)	Selina Shirin Hinzmann (20)	Stefanie Black (20)
Over 25s (Anders)	Alexander Grant (30)	Manuel "Elto" El-Tohamy (29)	Sheila "Shylee" Rothberg (28)
Groups and Bands (Weist)	EES & The Yes-Ja! Band	Scheer	Wait of the World
