= Till Brönner =

German jazz musician and composer

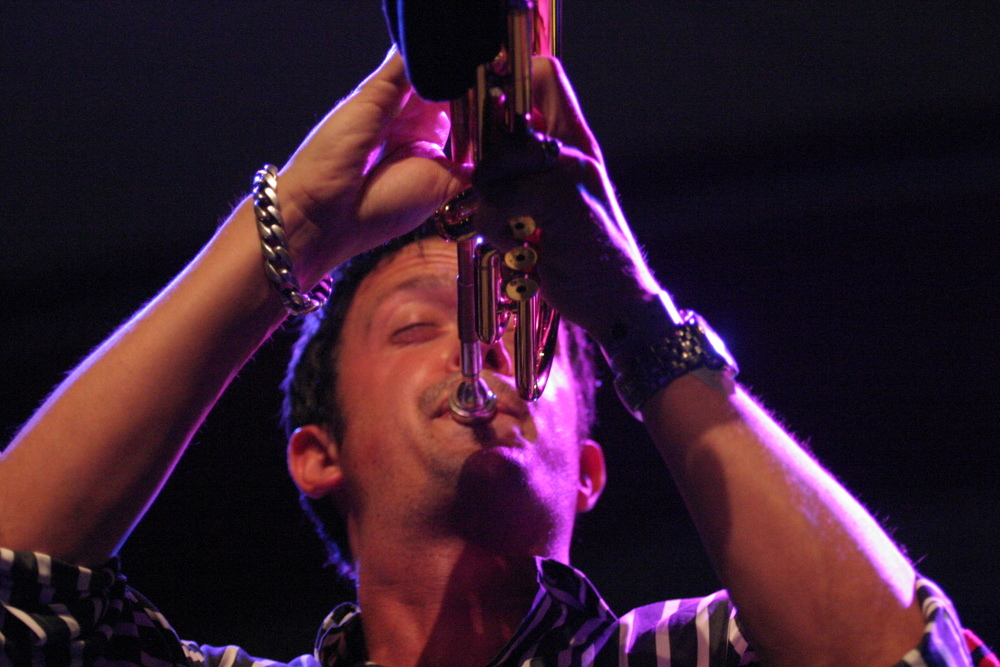
- Brönner performing in 2006

Background information
- Born: 6 May 1971 (age 54); Viersen, West Germany
- Genres: Jazz fusion, vocal jazz, pop
- Occupations: Musician, arranger, record producer
- Instruments: Trumpet, Flügelhorn
- Years active: 1991–present
- Label: Verve
- Website: tillbroenner.de

Till Brönner (German: [tɪl ˈbʁœnɐ]; born 6 May 1971 in Viersen, West Germany) is a German jazz trumpeter, flügelhorn player, singer, composer, producer and photographer.

== History ==
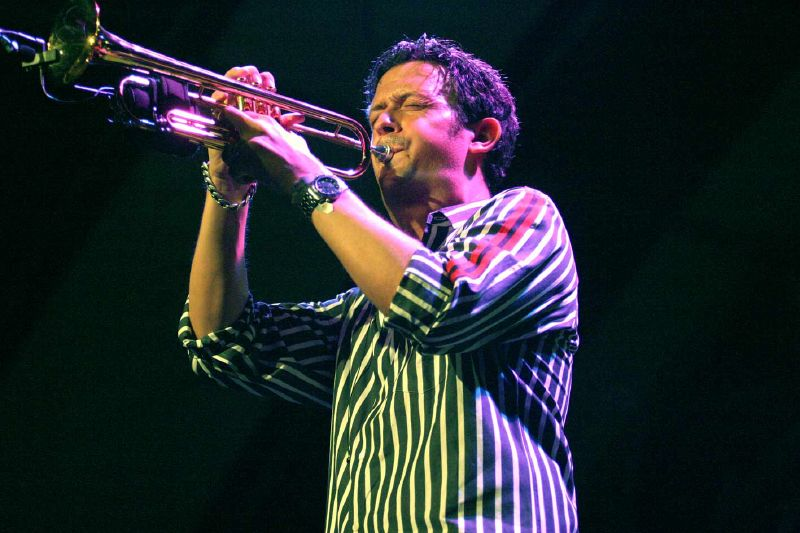

From 1989–1991, Brönner was a member of the Peter Herbolzheimer Rhythm Combination & Brass. At the age of twenty, he became solo trumpeter of the RIAS Big Band Berlin under Horst Jankowski and later Jiggs Whigham.

Brönner recorded his debut album, Generations of Jazz (1993) with Ray Brown and Jeff Hamilton. His vocal debut was on Love (Verve, 1998). His album That Summer (2004) landed on the German pop chart at No. 16 and made him the bestselling jazz musician in Germany's history. Larry Klein produced his next two albums. Oceana (2006) featured appearances by vocalists Carla Bruni, Madeleine Peyroux, and Luciana Souza. Rio (2009) was a tribute to bossa nova and Brazilian music with appearances by Kurt Elling, Melody Gardot, Sergio Mendes, Milton Nascimento, and Luciana Souza.

Brönner wrote the score for Jazz Seen, a documentary about photographer William Claxton, and composed the soundtrack for Höllentour, a movie about the Tour de France bicycle race. In 2014, he released The Movie Album, which contained cover versions of songs from old movies to the present, recorded in Los Angeles and produced by jazz guitarist and producer Chuck Loeb. In 2016 he released his Sony Masterworks debut "The Good Life", a swinging album of standards and originals, produced by Dutch producer legend Ruud Jacobs. In 2018, he teamed-up with German bassist Dieter Ilg for his second Sony release "Nightfall", a duo album which won him a platinum record in this category.

== Discography ==
- Generations of Jazz (Minor Music, 1994)
- German Songs (Minor Music, 1995)
- My Secret Love (Minor Music, 1996)
- Midnight (Universal Classics & Jazz, 1996)
- Love (Verve, 1998)
- Chattin' with Chet (Verve, 2000)
- Blue Eyed Soul (Universal/Verve, 2002)
- Jazz Seen (A&M, 2002)
- That Summer (Verve, 2004)
- Oceana (EmArcy, 2006)
- The Christmas Album (Universal/Verve, 2007)
- Rio (Universal Classics & Jazz, 2008)
- At the End of the Day (Bam Bam, 2010)
- Till Bronner (Bam Bam, 2012)
- The Movie Album (Verve, 2014)
- The Good Life (Sony Masterworks, 2016)
- Nightfall (Sony Masterworks, 2018) (with Dieter Ilg)
- On Vacation (Sony Music Entertainment, 2020) (with Bob James)
- Christmas (Sony Music Entertainment, 2021)
- Italia (earMusic/Edel, 2025)
