= The Essential Eric Carmen =

Compilation album by Eric Carmen
- Released: March 25, 2014
- Genre: Rock, Soft rock
- Length: 2:04:48
- Label: Arista, Legacy, Sony Music
- Producer: Jimmy Ienner, Eric Carmen

Eric Carmen chronology
All by Myself – The Best of Eric Carmen (1999)	The Essential Eric Carmen (2014)

The Essential Eric Carmen is a two-disc compilation album that contain 15 tracks each by American soft rock singer, songwriter, guitarist and keyboardist Eric Carmen, released on March 25, 2014. It is part of Sony BMG's Essential series of compilation albums and includes tracks from Carmen's solo output, as well as tracks from his Raspberries days and Cyrus Erie. The tracks consist of some of Carmen's biggest hits and popular album 1968 as leader of American band Cyrus Erie through his 1984 release Eric Carmen.

== Reception ==
Professional ratings
Review scores
Source	Rating
AllMusic	4.5/5 stars
American Songwriter	3.5/5 stars

Tony Peters from Iconfetch says: "Most music today is consumed through lousy quality ear buds or computer speakers. Yet, once in a while, a remaster comes along that sounds so good, you'll want to dust off that old CD player to get the full experience. The Essential Eric Carmen is the first two-disc collection to span the talented singer/songwriter's entire career. And, it's one of those rare CDs where the sonic improvement is so noticeable, you'll find yourself hearing things you never heard before.

Stephen Thomas Erlewine from AllMusic says: "That means that this collection does indeed have almost everything of note, from the big Raspberries hits 'Go All the Way' and 'Overnight Sensation (Hit Record),' through the '70s solo smashes 'All by Myself' and 'Never Gonna Fall in Love Again,' through those late-'80s sensations 'Hungry Eyes' and 'Make Me Lose Control.'"

David Luhrssen from Shepherd Express wrote: "The real surprise on The Essential Eric Carmen is the opening 1969 track from his first recording act, "Cyrus Erie," with its excellent approximation of the mid-'60s Beatles' sound.

The Second Disc says: "The first track on Legacy Recordings' new double-disc anthology The Essential Eric Carmen (Arista/Legacy 88883745522) is titled, appropriately enough, "Get the Message." And the message relayed by its 30 nuggets comes through loud and clear: whether as power pop prince, classically-inspired MOR balladeer or nostalgic yet contemporary eighties rocker, Eric Carmen had the goods."

== Track listing ==
All tracks are written by Eric Carmen, except where noted.

=== Disc one ===
No.	Title	Writer(s)	Originally from	Length
1.	"Get the Message"		Sparrow (1968)	2:25
2.	"Go All the Way"		Raspberries (1972)	3:20
3.	"I Wanna Be with You"		Fresh (1972)	3:05
4.	"Let's Pretend"		Fresh (1972)	3:41
5.	"Tonight"		Side 3 (1973)	3:41
6.	"Overnight Sensation (Hit Record)"		Starting Over (1974)	5:26
7.	"Sunrise"		Eric Carmen (1975)	5:22
8.	"My Girl"		Eric Carmen (1975)	3:02
9.	"All by Myself"	Carmen, Sergei Rachmaninoff	Eric Carmen (1975)	7:09
10.	"Never Gonna Fall in Love Again"	Carmen, Rachmaninoff	Eric Carmen (1975)	3:46
11.	"Last Night"		Eric Carmen (1975)	2:57
12.	"Starting Over"		Live at The Bottom Line, New York, NY - April 1976 (Note: "Starting Over" originally appeared on the album Starting Over (1974).)	4:27
13.	"That's Rock 'n' Roll"		Live at The Bottom Line, New York, NY - April 1976 (Note: "That's Rock 'n' Roll" originally appeared on the album Eric Carmen (1975).)	4:36
14.	"Run Away"		Boats Against the Current (1977)	8:02
15.	"Love Is All That Matters"		Boats Against the Current (1977)	4:17

=== Disc two ===
No.	Title	Writer(s)	Originally from	Length
1.	"Boats Against the Current"		Boats Against the Current (1977)	4:22
2.	"Marathon Man"		Boats Against the Current (1977)	3:54
3.	"She Did It"		Boats Against the Current (1977)	3:47
4.	"Nowhere to Hide"		Boats Against the Current (1977)	5:00
5.	"Change of Heart"		Change of Heart (1978)	3:41
6.	"Hey Deanie"		Change of Heart (1978)	4:29
7.	"Desperate Fools"		Change of Heart (1978)	3:03
8.	"Someday"		Change of Heart (1978)	2:53
9.	"It Hurts Too Much"		Tonight You're Mine (1980)	4:17
10.	"Tonight You're Mine"		Tonight You're Mine (1980)	4:01
11.	"The Way We Used to Be"		Eric Carmen (1984)	3:15
12.	"Hungry Eyes"	Franke Previte, John DeNicola	Dirty Dancing (1987)	4:11
13.	"Make Me Lose Control"	Carmen, Dean Pitchford	The Best of Eric Carmen (1988)	4:45
14.	"Ecstasy"		Live 2005	4:08
15.	"Brand New Year"			3:46

== Personnel ==
- Eric Carmen – lead vocals, guitar, keyboards, bass guitar, backing vocals, piano
- Dan Hrdlicka – lead guitar, backing vocals
- Steve Knill – bass, backing vocals
- Richard Reising – synthesizer, organ, backing vocals
- Dwight Krueger, Michael McBride – drums, percussion, backing vocals
- Jackie Kelso – uncredited flute solo on "Never Gonna Fall in Love Again"
- Hugh McCracken – slide guitar solo on "All By Myself
- Richard Reising – synthesizers, harpsichord, guitars, backing vocals
- George Sipl – keyboards, synthesizers, organ, backing vocals
- Dan Hrdlicka – guitars, backing vocals
- Steve Knill – bass, backing vocals
- Dwight Krueger – drums, percussion, backing vocals
- Michael McBride – drums, percussion, backing vocals
- Jeff Porcaro - drums on "She Did It"

Raspberries

- Wally Bryson – lead guitar, backing and lead vocals (Disc 1) (tracks 2–5)
- Dave Smalley – rhythm guitar, backing and lead vocals (Disc 1) (tracks 2–5)
- Jim Bonfanti – drums, backing vocals (Disc 1) (tracks 2–5)
