= The Definitive Collection (Eric Carmen album) =

Compilation album by Eric Carmen
- Released: June 17, 1997
- Genre: Soft rock, Pop rock
- Length: 72:00
- Label: Arista
- Producer: Bob Irwin

Eric Carmen chronology
| The Best of Eric Carmen (1988) | The Definitive Collection (1997) | I Was Born to Love You (1998) |

Professional ratings
Review scores
| Source | Rating |
|---|---|
| AllMusic | 4.5/5 stars |

The Definitive Collection is a 1997 greatest hits album of all the singles released by Cleveland, Ohio singer-songwriter Eric Carmen. It features five hits by the Raspberries, a power pop group which he led in the early 1970s. It also contains his versions of two major hits which he wrote for Shaun Cassidy, his popular song from the movie Dirty Dancing, and his greatest hit, "All By Myself", which peaked at No. 2 on the Billboard Hot 100 on March 5, 1976.

== Critical reception ==
Stephen Thomas Erlewine of AllMusic writes, "The Definitive Collection lives up to its title. Over the course of a single disc, the compilation features all of Eric Carmen's best-known songs and biggest hits"

== Track listing ==
All tracks are written by Eric Carmen, unless otherwise noted.

| No. | Title | Writer(s) | Original album | Length |
|---|---|---|---|---|
| 1. | "Go All the Way" (with The Raspberries) | | Raspberries (1972) | 3:18 |
| 2. | "I Wanna Be With You" (with The Raspberries) | | Fresh (1972) | 3:00 |
| 3. | "Let's Pretend" (with The Raspberries) | | Fresh | 3:36 |
| 4. | "Tonight" (with The Raspberries) | | Side 3 (1973) | 3:39 |
| 5. | "Overnight Sensation (Hit Record)" (with The Raspberries) | | Starting Over (1974) | 5:20 |
| 6. | "All by Myself" | | Eric Carmen (1975) | 4:30 |
| 7. | "Sunrise" | | Eric Carmen | 5:10 |
| 8. | "That's Rock 'n' Roll" | | Eric Carmen | 3:06 |
| 9. | "Never Gonna Fall in Love Again" | | Eric Carmen | 3:41 |
| 10. | "No Hard Feelings" | | Eric Carmen | 5:34 |
| 11. | "Boats Against the Current" | | Boats Against the Current (1977) | 4:17 |
| 12. | "She Did It" | | Boats Against the Current | 3:43 |
| 13. | "Change of Heart" | Eric Carmen; Dean Pitchford | Change of Heart (1978) | 3:38 |
| 14. | "Hey Deanie" | | Change of Heart | 4:27 |
| 15. | "Desperate Fools" | | Change of Heart | 3:06 |
| 16. | "The Way We Used to Be" | | Eric Carmen (1984) | 3:13 |
| 17. | "Hungry Eyes" | John DeNicola; Franke Previte | Dirty Dancing (Original Soundtrack) (1987) | 3:59 |
| 18. | "Make Me Lose Control" | Eric Carmen; Dean Pitchford | The Best of Eric Carmen (1988) | 4:43 |
| Total length: | | | | 72:00 |

== Musicians ==
- Eric Carmen – Bass, Drums, Guitar, Acoustic Guitar, Electric Guitar, Rhythm Guitar, Harpsichord, Mellotron, Percussion, Piano, Electric Piano, Synthesizer, Tack Piano, Vocals, Background Vocals
- Jim Bonfanti – Drums, Vocals
- Mike Botts – Drums
- Ollie E. Brown – Percussion
- Wally Bryson – Guitar, Acoustic Guitar, Rhythm Guitar, Vocals
- Charles Calello – Horn Arrangements
- Tony Camillo – Horn Arrangements
- Burton Cummings – Piano
- Gene Estes – Percussion
- Jimmie Haskell – Horn Arrangements
- James Newton Howard – Synthesizer
- Dan Hrdlicka – Guitar, Background Vocals
- Bruce Johnston – Background Vocals
- Steve Knill – Bass, Background Vocals
- Danny Kortchmar – Acoustic Guitar
- D. Dwight Krueger – Drums, Percussion, Background Vocals
- Michael McBride – Drums, Percussion, Vocals, Background Vocals
- Scott McCarl – Bass, Acoustic Guitar, Vocals
- Tommy Morgan – Harmonica
- Nigel Olsson – Drums, Background Vocals
- Joe Porcaro – Drums, Percussion
- Richard Reising – Guitar, Electric Guitar, Harpsichord, Synthesizer, Background Vocals
- Valerie Carter – Background Vocals
- Joe Chemay – Background Vocals
- Curt Becher – Background Vocals
- Brenda Russell – Background Vocals
- Brian Russell – Background Vocals
- Samantha Sang – Background Vocals
- George Sipl – Organ, Synthesizer, Background Vocals
- Dave Smalley – Bass, Rhythm Guitar, Vocals
- Jai Winding – Piano, Electric Piano
- Dave Wintour – Bass
- Richie Zito – Electric Guitar

== Production ==
- Eric Carmen – Arranger, Producer
- Bob Irwin – Compilation Producer, Mastering, Producer
- Bob Gaudio – Producer
- Jimmy Ienner – Executive Producer, Producer
- Tom Rabstenek – Mastering
- George Marino – Mastering
- Greg Calbi – Mastering
- Doug Sax – Mastering
- Bernie Grundman – Mastering
- Mark Howlett – Engineer
- Tim Kramer – Engineer
- Jim Bell – Engineer
- Kevin Beamish – Engineer
- Arnei Rosenberg – Engineer
- Shelly Yakus – Engineer
- Howard Steele – Engineer
- Thom Wilson – Engineer
- Jack Sherdel – Engineer
- Dennis Kirk – Engineer
- David Henson – Engineer
- Don Gehman – Engineer
- Larry Emerine – Engineer
- Tony d'Amico – Engineer
- Jim DeMain – Engineer, Remixing
- Val Garay – Mixing
- Joe Barbaria – Assistant Engineer
- Rod O'Brien – Assistant Engineer
- George Ybara – Assistant Engineer
- Corky Stasiak – Assistant Engineer
- David Thoener – Assistant Engineer
- Kevin Herron – Assistant Engineer
- Dennis Ferrante – Assistant Engineer
- George Sipl – Remixing
- Rita Karidis – Art Direction

Track information and credits adapted from AllMusic and the album's liner notes.
