= The Best of Eric Carmen =

Greatest hits album by Eric Carmen
- Released: June 3, 1988
- Recorded: 1975−1987
- Genre: Soft rock; pop rock
- Length: 41:10 (original), 45:55 (reissue)
- Label: Arista

Eric Carmen chronology
Eric Carmen (1984)	The Best of Eric Carmen (1988)	The Definitive Collection (1997)

Professional ratings
Review scores
Source	Rating
AllMusic	4.5/5 stars

The Best of Eric Carmen is a greatest hits album released by Arista Records in 1988, featuring solo recordings from Cleveland, Ohio singer-songwriter Eric Carmen. Unlike subsequent compilations such as The Definitive Collection, this record omits any hits Carmen had with his group the Raspberries. It also fails to include any songs from his 1984 self-titled album on Geffen Records. Instead, The Best Of Eric Carmen features a mix of successful singles and album tracks pulled from his four solo albums with Arista. Notable hits include "All by Myself" (No. 2, US), "Never Gonna Fall in Love Again" (No. 11, US) and "She Did It" (No. 23, US). Carmen's original recordings of "That's Rock 'n' Roll" and "Hey Deanie" are included since the compositions became major hits as covers by teen idol Shawn Cassidy. Additionally, it features his then-recent comeback hit "Hungry Eyes" (1987, No. 4, US), taken from the Dirty Dancing soundtrack.

After an initial release on LP (AL-8547) and cassette (AC-8547), the album was reissued with a new catalogue number (ending in 8548) later in the year to include "Make Me Lose Control", his follow-up single to "Hungry Eyes", after it reached number three on the Billboard Hot 100. This expanded version of the album was also released on CD (ARCD-8548).

== Track listing ==
All tracks written and produced by Eric Carmen except where noted.

Side one
No.	Title	Writer(s)	Producer(s)	Length
1.	"All by Myself"	Eric Carmen, Sergei Rachmaninoff (uncredited)	Jimmy Ienner	4:48
2.	"Never Gonna Fall in Love Again"	Eric Carmen, Sergei Rachmaninoff (uncredited)	Jimmy Ienner	3:35
3.	"That's Rock 'n' Roll"		Jimmy Ienner	3:11
4.	"Hey Deanie"			4:31
5.	"Hungry Eyes"	John DeNicola, Franke Previte	Eric Carmen, Jimmy Ienner (executive)	4:06
Total length:				20:11

Side two
No.	Title	Writer(s)	Producer(s)	Length
1.	"Make Me Lose Control"	Eric Carmen, Dean Pitchford	Jimmy Ienner	4:45
2.	"Change of Heart"			3:30
3.	"She Did It"			3:48
4.	"It Hurts Too Much"		Harry Maslin	4:09
5.	"No Hard Feelings"		Jimmy Ienner	5:10
6.	"Boats Against the Current"			4:22
Total length:				25:44

Note: "Make Me Lose Control" only appears on reissue copies of the compilation (those ending with the catalogue number 8548).

== Charts ==
Chart (1988)	Peak position
Australian Albums (ARIA)	17
New Zealand Albums (RMNZ)	26
US Billboard 200	59
