= Ultimate Edition =

Ultimate Edition can refer to:

- Marvel Ultimates, a series of Marvel Comics editions
- Windows Vista editions, the Windows Vista edition
- Windows 7 editions, the Windows 7 edition
- Dead or Alive Ultimate, the Dead Or Alive video game compilation
- The Ultimate Matrix Collection, the Matrix Collection edition
- Ultimate Ghosts 'n Goblins, the Ghosts'n'Goblins edition
- Ultimate Dirty Dancing, the Ultimate Edition soundtrack for Dirty Dancing
- James Bond Ultimate Edition, the James Bond collection edition
- Unforgettable: Ultimate Edition, the Selena compilation
- Crazy Frog Presents More Crazy Hits, also known as "The Ultimate Edition"
- Superman Ultimate Collector's Edition, the Superman film series collection
- The Ultimate Collection (disambiguation)
- The Ultimate Anthology
- The Ultimate Edition, the boxed set by Klaus Schulze
