= I Was Born to Love You =

I Was Born to Love You may refer to:

- "I Was Born to Love You" (song), by Freddie Mercury, 1985, re-worked by Queen in 1995
- I Was Born to Love You (album), by Eric Carmen, 2000
