= I Wanna Hear It from Your Lips =

- Cover art for some 12-inch editions, including the US one

Single by Eric Carmen

from the album Eric Carmen
- B-side: "Spotlight" "I Wanna Hear It From Your Lips (Instrumental)" [12" version only]
- Released: December 1984
- Recorded: 1984
- Genre: New wave - soft rock
- Length: 3:12 (7" version); 3:17 (Album version); 5:58 (12" version)
- Label: Geffen
- Songwriters: Eric Carmen, Dean Pitchford
- Producer: Bob Gaudio

Eric Carmen singles chronology
"It Hurts Too Much" (1980)	"I Wanna Hear It from Your Lips" (1984)	"I'm Through With Love" (1985)

"I Wanna Hear It from Your Lips" is a 1984 hit song by Eric Carmen. It was the lead single from his sixth album, which was his second eponymous album.

The song reached number 35 on the Billboard Hot 100 during February 1985, becoming his sixth of eight Top 40 singles during his solo career. The song was a bigger adult contemporary hit, reaching number 10 in the United States and number 17 in Canada.

Classic Rock History critic Brian Kachejian rated it to be Carmen's 9th greatest solo song, pointing out its similarity with Bruce Springsteen's song "Fire". Chaospin critic Linda Giantino rated it Carmen's 8th greatest solo song, praising the backup vocals and noting that "the lyrics of the song sound a little sensual."

== Charts ==
Chart (1985)	Peak position
Canadian RPM Adult Contemporary	17
US Billboard Hot 100	35
US Billboard Adult Contemporary	10
US Radio & Records	30
US Radio & Records Adult Contemporary	8
US Cash Box Top 100	37

== Cover versions ==
In 1986, Louise Mandrell recorded a country version of "I Wanna Hear It from Your Lips". Her rendition reached number 35 on the US country chart, and number 41 on the Canadian country chart.
