= Ultimate Dirty Dancing =

Soundtrack album by various artists
- Released: December 9, 2003
- Length: 74:36
- Label: RCA Records

Dirty Dancing chronology
More Dirty Dancing (1988)	Ultimate Dirty Dancing (2003)	Dirty Dancing: Twentieth Anniversary Edition (2007)

Professional ratings
Review scores
Source	Rating
AllMusic	4/5 stars

Ultimate Dirty Dancing is a soundtrack album containing every song from the 1987 film Dirty Dancing, sequenced in the order it appears in the film. It was released on December 9, 2003, by RCA Records.

== Track listing ==
Track listing

1. "Be My Baby" – The Ronettes
2. "Big Girls Don't Cry" – Frankie Valli & The Four Seasons
3. "Merengue" – Michael Lloyd & Le Disc
4. "Trot the Fox" – Michael Lloyd & Le Disc
5. "Johnny's Mambo" – Michael Lloyd & Le Disc
6. "Time of My Life" (instrumental version) – The John Morris Orchestra
7. "Where Are You Tonight?" – Tom Johnston
8. "Do You Love Me" – The Contours
9. "Love Man" – Otis Redding
10. "Stay" – Maurice Williams and the Zodiacs
11. "Wipe Out" – The Surfaris
12. "Hungry Eyes" – Eric Carmen
13. "Overload" – Zappacosta
14. "Hey! Baby" – Bruce Channel
15. "De Todo Un Poco" – Michael Lloyd & Le Disc
16. "Some Kind of Wonderful" – The Drifters
17. "These Arms of Mine" – Otis Redding
18. "Cry to Me" – Solomon Burke
19. "Will You Love Me Tomorrow" – The Shirelles
20. "Love Is Strange" – Mickey & Sylvia
21. "You Don't Own Me" – The Blow Monkeys
22. "Yes" – Merry Clayton
23. "In the Still of the Night" – The Five Satins
24. "She's Like the Wind" – Patrick Swayze
25. "Kellerman's Anthem" – The Emile Bergstein Chorale
26. "(I've Had) The Time of My Life" – Bill Medley & Jennifer Warnes

== Charts ==
=== Weekly charts ===
Chart (2004–2005)	Peak position
Australian Albums (ARIA)	5
Austrian Albums (Ö3 Austria)	17
Belgian Albums (Ultratop Flanders)	20
Belgian Albums (Ultratop Wallonia)	8
Danish Albums (Hitlisten)	5
Dutch Albums (Album Top 100)	17
German Albums (Offizielle Top 100)	11
Polish Albums (ZPAV)	19
Swiss Albums (Schweizer Hitparade)	41
UK Compilation Albums (Official Charts)	1
UK Soundtrack Albums (Official Charts)	1
US Billboard 200	114

=== Year-end chart ===
Chart (2004)	Position
German Albums (Offizielle Top 100)	77

Chart (2005)	Position
Australian Albums (ARIA)	84

== Certifications ==
Region	Certification	Certified units/sales
United Kingdom (BPI)	3× Platinum	900,000^{^}
^{^} Shipments figures based on certification alone.
