= Super (2010 American film) =

2010 film directed by James Gunn

- Theatrical release poster
- Directed by: James Gunn
- Written by: James Gunn
- Produced by: Ted Hope; Miranda Bailey
- Starring: Rainn Wilson; Elliot Page; Liv Tyler; Kevin Bacon; Nathan Fillion; Gregg Henry; Michael Rooker; Andre Royo; Sean Gunn; Stephen Blackehart; Linda Cardellini
- Cinematography: Steve Gainer
- Edited by: Cara Silverman
- Music by: Tyler Bates
- Production companies: Cold Iron Pictures; This Is That; Ambush Entertainment
- Distributed by: IFC Midnight
- Release dates: September 12, 2010 (TIFF); April 1, 2011 (United States)
- Running time: 96 minutes
- Country: United States
- Language: English
- Budget: $2.5 million
- Box office: $593,933

Super is a 2010 American black comedy superhero film written and directed by James Gunn. It stars Rainn Wilson, Elliot Page, (Note: Credited as Ellen Page) Liv Tyler, Kevin Bacon, and Nathan Fillion. The film follows an ordinary man who becomes a masked superhero called the Crimson Bolt, uses savage violence to compensate for his lack of superhuman abilities, and sets out to rescue his wife from a drug dealer.

Super premiered at the 2010 Toronto International Film Festival on September 12, 2010, and was released in theaters in the United States on April 1, 2011, and on video on demand on April 13 by IFC Midnight. The film was released unrated in U.S. theaters, and later received an R rating for its DVD and Blu-ray release. It received mixed reviews from critics and due to a limited release the film was a box office failure that grossed just $593,933 on a budget of $2.5 million. The film has since been considered a cult classic, particularly among fans who appreciate its subversive and unconventional approach to the superhero genre.

== Plot ==
Frank Darbo, a devoutly religious short-order cook, recalls his only two good memories from an otherwise disappointing life: marrying his wife Sarah and pointing a police officer in the direction of a man who snatched a woman's purse. He immortalizes these events in two crayon drawings hung on his wall for inspiration. Sarah, a recovering drug addict, has left him for Jacques, a charismatic strip club owner and drug lord who gets her hooked on drugs again. Frank sinks into depression and has a vision wherein he is touched by the finger of God and meets the Holy Avenger, a superhero from a Christian network TV show who tells Frank that God has chosen him for a very special purpose.

Frank believes that God has chosen him to become a superhero and goes to a local comic book store for inspiration. His claim that he is designing a new superhero is met with enthusiastic appreciation from the young store clerk, Libby, and he creates a superhero costume before assuming the identity of the "Crimson Bolt". Lacking superhuman abilities, he deals with injustice in his own way, using a pipe wrench to savagely beat people such as thieves, drug dealers, child molesters, and a man who simply cuts in line at the movies. The Crimson Bolt soon becomes a media sensation, initially viewed as a violent psychopath, but he begins to gain public appreciation after the criminal backgrounds of many of his victims come to light.

Frank later attempts to rescue Sarah at Jacques' house, but Jacques' thugs recognize him under the costume and shoot him in the leg as he flees while climbing over a fence. A wounded Frank goes to Libby for help. Libby persuades Frank to let her become the Crimson Bolt's "kid sidekick", calling herself "Boltie" and designing a costume of her own. She proves to be more unhinged than Frank, using her superhero guise to nearly kill a man who possibly vandalized her friend's car, and Frank decides to let her go but changes his mind when she rescues him from some of Jacques' thugs at a gas station. Libby soon becomes enamored with Frank, but he turns down her advances, insisting he is still married. Arguing that the rules are different when they are using their superhero identities, Libby rapes Frank while the two are in costume and later claims to have been suffering from sexsomnia. Frank runs to the bathroom and vomits, encountering a vision of Sarah in the toilet. He decides to rescue her from Jacques once and for all.

Armed with guns, pipe bombs, and bulletproof vests, Frank and Libby sneak into Jacques' ranch and kill the first few guards they encounter. Frank is shot in the chest and saved by his bulletproof vest, but Libby is shot in the head and killed. Devastated, Frank furiously slaughters all of Jacques' thugs. Inside, Jacques shoots Frank, but Frank gains the upper hand and stabs Jacques to death as a horrified Sarah watches. Frank takes Sarah home and she stays with him for a few months, which Frank surmises is "out of a sense of obligation" for saving her life.

One day, Frank returns home to find Sarah has left him again. This time, she overcomes her addiction and uses her experiences to help others with similar problems. She marries a man named Patrick and has four children. Frank is convinced that her children will change the world for the better. Frank, content and living alone with a pet rabbit, looks at his wall of happy memories. The wall is now covered with pictures of his experiences from his time spent with Libby and pictures of Sarah's children, who call him "Uncle Frank". He gazes at Libby's picture as a tear runs down his cheek.

== Cast ==
- Rainn Wilson as Frank Darbo/The Crimson Bolt, a devoutly religious short-order cook who becomes a superhero.
  - Grant Goodman as young Frank Darbo
- Elliot Page as Libby/Boltie, a mentally unstable comic book store employee who becomes Frank's sidekick
- Liv Tyler as Sarah Helgeland, Frank's wife and recovering drug addict who relapses upon meeting Jacques
- Kevin Bacon as Jacques, a wealthy, charismatic, and friendly but ruthless drug lord and dealer
- Nathan Fillion as The Holy Avenger, the main character of a TV series on a local Christian television station that everyone in town, barring Frank, believes is just a joke. The character is based on the actual Christian superhero series Bibleman.
- Michael Rooker as Abe, a candy-loving conspiracy theorist who is one of Jacques' henchmen
- Gregg Henry as Det. John Felkner, a local police detective
- Andre Royo as Hamilton, Frank's friend and co-worker at the local diner
- Sean Gunn as Toby, another one of Jacques' henchmen
- Stephen Blackehart as Quill, another one of Jacques' henchmen
- Greg Ingram as Long-Haired Hood, the first criminal Frank brings to justice as The Crimson Bolt
- William Katt as Sgt. Fitzgibbon, Detective Felkner's boss
- Linda Cardellini as Maria, the Pet Store Employee and one of Frank's friends
- Rob Zombie as the voice of God, who convinces Frank to become a superhero
- Nathaniel "Don Mac" Johnson as Mr. Range, a crime lord with whom Jacques is trying to make a deal
- Mollie Milligan as Jennifer Helgeland, Sarah's sister
- James Gunn as Demonswill, one of the Holy Avenger's enemies
- Zach Gilford as Jerry
- Mikaela Hoover as Holly
- Steve Agee as Comic Book Store Employee
- Daniel Mignault as Feature/Brother
- Lloyd Kaufman as 911 Man

== Production ==
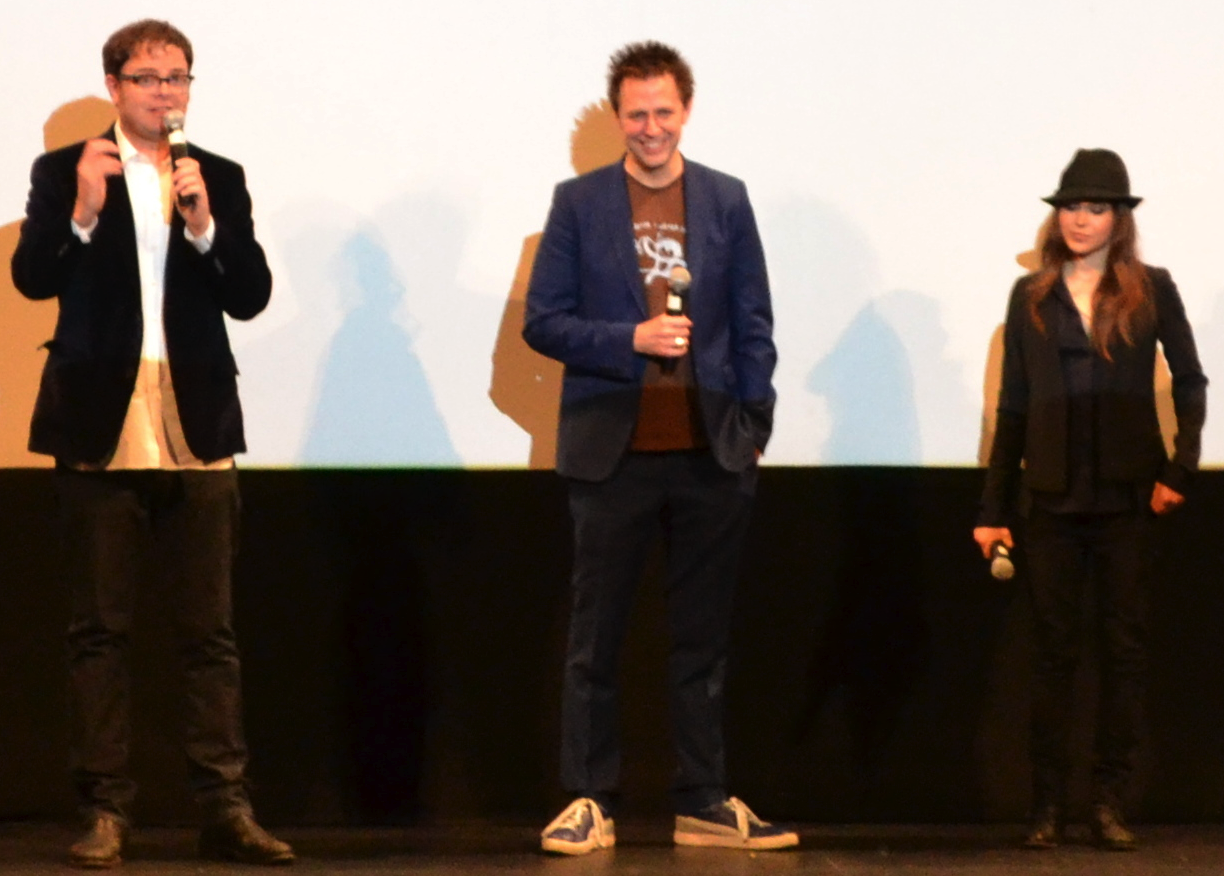
Rainn Wilson, James Gunn and Elliot Page at the SXSW film festival.

Super was filmed between December 9, 2009, and January 24, 2010, in Shreveport, Louisiana, with additional shooting at director James Gunn's home in Los Angeles, California (the comic book store shown in the film is a real store, ComicSmash, in Studio City). Since the film was a low-budget, independent project, everyone involved in the film was paid scale (the minimum allowed by the Screen Actors Guild). Tyler Bates worked on the soundtrack.

Gunn has said in interviews that he had been working on the script for Super since 2002, but he had a hard time getting it made, as producers felt that the content was too violent and esoteric. In addition, Gunn had a hard time deciding on the right actor to play Frank; John C. Reilly was Gunn's top choice, but he wasn't considered to be a big enough star for the film to get made. After Slither was made, Gunn had effectively put the project on hold until his ex-wife Jenna Fischer encouraged him to go through with it and recommended Rainn Wilson, her co-star from The Office. Wilson read the script while on set and decided he wanted to join the film, and in turn sent the script to Elliot Page, with whom he had worked in Juno, who immediately accepted the role of Libby.

Super was Gunn's second film dealing with superheroes, the first being The Specials in 2000 that he wrote, but did not direct. Gunn has said that examining superheroes from a different angle interests him, and that he may do more films concerning the subject in the future. He was later chosen to direct the Marvel Studios superhero film Guardians of the Galaxy (2014), its sequels, Vol. 2 (2017) and Vol. 3 (2023), the DC Comics film The Suicide Squad (2021) and its television spin-off Peacemaker (2022–2025). He also became co-CEO of DC Studios in 2022, writing and directing the films Superman (2025) and its sequel Man of Tomorrow (2027). He also produced the superhero horror film Brightburn (2019), in which Wilson also briefly reprises his role as Frank Darbo in photographic form indicating that Super and Brightburn are set in the same universe.

== Reception ==
=== Critical response ===
Super received mixed reviews from critics, who debated the moral ambiguity, violence and messages, but still received praise for the acting, tone, writing and humor. According to the review aggregator website Rotten Tomatoes, 50% of critics have given the film a positive review based on 127 reviews, with an average rating of 5.7/10. The site's critics consensus reads, "Super's intriguing premise and talented cast are drowned in a blood-red sea of graphic violence, jarring tonal shifts, and thinly written characters." At Metacritic, the film has a weighted average score of 50 out of 100 based on 27 critics, indicating "mixed or average reviews". Catherine Bray of Film4 wrote, "It's not that this type of movie shouldn't be made—this type of movie could be brilliant—but it plays like every first draft idea anyone had found its way to the screen because it made someone laugh over a few drinks ... Some really interesting ideas and the odd flash of awesomeness, but overall a big old misfire with some ill-judged nastiness." Al Kratina reporting at the Fantasia Film Festival wrote, "There's a great movie somewhere inside James Gunn's dark comedy. Super ... Super is an undeniably entertaining film. But there's something off about it ... Super is a funny film, a twisted story, and occasionally a very good movie, just rarely at the same time."

Entertainment Weekly critic Owen Gleiberman wrote, "This trifle about a doofus who becomes a costumed superhero, even though he has no special powers, might have seemed funkier before Kick-Ass. Yet the movie is written and directed by James Gunn with a certain whimsical black-comic flair ... It's really a one-joke movie, but the joke is a good one: Frank's 'crusade' is just a geek's screw-loose revenge, which Wilson, digging into the character's misery, makes oddly sympathetic." Conversely, Scott Weinberg of Cinematical wrote, "Chock full of insanely graphic violence, awash in thoroughly un-PC perspectives, and more than willing to keep on punching long after the audience is virtually incredulous, Super is fun and funny, dark and twisted, semi-schizophrenic and certifiably insane. What I liked most was its simple audacity. And Ellen Page."

=== Box office ===
Super made $46,549 on opening weekend with eleven theaters, averaging $4,232 per theater, which was considered by analysts to be "a disappointing start" for the film. Conversely, the film fared better on VOD and had been anticipated to be the most successful film VOD for IFC. As of August 2011, it made $1.2 million on DVD and Blu-ray sales.

During an interview, Wilson explained his thoughts about the struggling box office performance, saying the risky tonal decision worked against the film in its limited theatrical release:

"It is a comedy. It's also an action movie, and it's also a drama, and it's also a really [messed] up genre, cult type of film. It's all of those things at one time, and people are not used to it. They're used to like, oh, The Avengers has some comedy in it, but it's action, and it's a comic-book-type thing. People really know exactly what world they're in. But in this one, it mixes so many different worlds, you're really off-balance. 'Cause you don't know if the next scene is going to be someone crying, or it's going to be ludicrous or it's going to be an animated sequence or an action sequence. You just don't know."

=== Awards ===
At the 2011 Fantasia Film Festival, Super was tied with the documentary Superheroes for the AQCC Prize; "For two films that perfectly capture the Zeitgeist of our age and that present elaborate reflections on one of the biggest Americans trends, the AQCC Jury has awarded its best international film prize, in a tie, to the fiction film Super by James Gunn and to the documentary Superheroes by Michael Barnett, two strong and complementary works."

== Soundtrack ==
The movie's 17-song soundtrack includes hit songs such as Eric Carmen's "It Hurts Too Much" and Cheap Trick's "If You Want My Love".

All music is composed by Tyler Bates, except where noted.

Track listing
No.	Title	Performed/composed by	Length
1.	"Calling All Destroyers"	Tsar
2.	"Two Perfect Moments"
3.	"It Hurts Too Much"	Eric Carmen
4.	"I Do"	Lo-def Dollz
5.	"The Prayer"
6.	"If You Want My Love"	Cheap Trick
7.	"God Knows My Name ’11"	Moneybrother
8.	"Finger Of God"
9.	"Holy Avenger’s Advice"
10.	"Nobody Knows You Anymore"	Terra Naomi
11.	"What It Was"	Aceyalone
12.	"The Second Prayer"
13.	"Born Under a Bad Sign"	Moneybrother
14.	"Let Your Body Decide"	The Ark
15.	"Libby Goes Down"
16.	"Aftermath And Resolution"
17.	"Sometimes Good Guys Don’t Wear White"	The Nomads

== Similarity to Kick-Ass ==
Close to the time that Super was released, another film on amateur superheroes, Kick-Ass, was released.

During the production process, Gunn, a friend of Kick-Ass creator Mark Millar, learned of the other film. In an interview after Super was released, he commented that "I was definitely wary of it, I was like 'This sucks! Kick-Ass is being made into a movie; is that gonna mean we're irrelevant?' But in the end the stories are so different. Our movie is about a guy who's on his own sort of spiritual quest and he just happens to wear a superhero costume during it. But it's really about the guy and not the costume."

Millar later defended Super in light of accusations that it was copying his work, "People have said to me, 'Oh my God, he's ripping off Kick-Ass,' because it's coming out one year later, but James was doing this when I was doing Kick-Ass as well. Both projects were coming together at exactly the same time." Millar went on to screen Super at his Kapow! comic convention in London.

Gunn also responded to the accusations, pointing out that "It sucks on the one hand and then on the other hand, who gives a shit? There are 4,000 bank heist movies. We can have five superheroes-without-powers movies. What does bum me out [is] people who pretend like Kick-Ass was the first superheroes without powers movie, when that's obviously the classic John Ritter film Hero at Large."
