= Make Me Lose Control =

Make Me Lose Control may refer to:

- "Make Me Lose Control" (song), a 1988 single by Eric Carmen
- Make Me Lose Control (Grey's Anatomy), a 2005 television episode
