= Emotion (Samantha Sang album) =

Studio album by Samantha Sang
- Released: 1978
- Recorded: 1977
- Genre: Pop, disco, soft rock, art rock
- Label: Private Stock
- Producer: Gary Klein, Nick DeCaro, Gibb-Galuten-Richardson

Samantha Sang chronology
Samantha Sang and Rocked the World (1975)	Emotion (1978)	From Dance to Love (1979)

Emotion is the second album by Australian singer Samantha Sang, released in 1978. It features her biggest hit "Emotion" (US No. 3) as well as her follow-up hit, "You Keep Me Dancin'" (US No. 56).

Barry Gibb of the Bee Gees produced and sang background vocals on the title track "Emotion", which he also co-wrote, as well as on "When Love Is Gone".

Sang covered Eric Carmen's 1978 hit song "Change of Heart"; it was featured as the B-side of "You Keep Me Dancin'". Sang re-recorded her 1970 single "The Love of a Woman", a song written by Barry and Maurice Gibb. Sang also covered "Charade", a song by the Bee Gees from 1974.

== Track listing ==
1. "You Keep Me Dancing" (Denny Randell, Sandy Linzer) – 2:59
2. "Charade" (Barry Gibb, Robin Gibb) – 3:29
3. "Emotion" (Barry Gibb, Robin Gibb) – 3:57
4. "Change of Heart" (Eric Carmen) – 3:14
5. "Living Without Your Love" (David Wolfert, Steve Nelson) – 3:51
6. "La La La - I Love You" (Thom Bell, William Hart) – 3:59
7. "But If She Moves You" (Arty Simon) – 4:15
8. "When Love Is Gone" (Francis Lai, Brian Wells, Paul Evans) – 3:46
9. "I Don't Wanna Go" (Bruce Roberts, Carole Bayer Sager) – 3:33
10. "The Love of a Woman" (Barry Gibb, Maurice Gibb) – 3:58

== Personnel ==
- Samantha Sang – vocals
- Barry Gibb – harmony and background vocals (tracks 3 and 8)
- Joey Murcia – guitar (tracks 3 and 8)
- George Bitzer – keyboards (tracks 3 and 8)
- Harold Cowart – bass (tracks 3 and 8)
- Ron Ziegler – drums (tracks 3 and 8)
- David Blumber – arranger
- James Newton Howard – synthesizer, arranger
- Neil Terk – art director, design
- Jim Massey – creative director
- Al Schmitt – engineer (remix)
- Frank Laffitte – photographer
- Gary Klein – producer

== Certifications ==
Region	Certification	Certified units/sales
United States (RIAA)	Gold	500,000^{^}
^{^} Shipments figures based on certification alone.
