= Eyeopener =

British dance group

- Origin: Manchester, England
- Genres: Dance, trance
- Years active: 2003–present
- Labels: All Around the World
- Members: Graham Turner; Mark Hall; Lee Monteverde

Eyeopener are a British dance group active since 2003. Their first hit, a cover of Eric Carmen's "Hungry Eyes", reached No. 16 on the UK Singles Chart and No. 7 on the Scottish Singles Chart. Their song "Sexy Eyes" was included on the compilation album Clubland 7.

== Discography ==
=== Singles ===
- "Open Your Eyes" (2003)
- "Hungry Eyes" (2004) - UK No. 16
- "Sexy Eyes" (2005)
- "Angel Eyes" (2005)
- "She's Like the Wind" (2007)
- "Singin' Dam Di Da Doo" (2008)
- "Will My Heart Survive"
