= More Dirty Dancing =

Soundtrack album by various artists
- Released: March 4, 1988
- Recorded: 1988
- Length: 34:19
- Label: RCA Victor
- Producers: Michael Lloyd; John Morris

Dirty Dancing chronology
Dirty Dancing: Original Soundtrack from the Vestron Motion Picture (1987)	More Dirty Dancing (1988)	Ultimate Dirty Dancing (2003)

More Dirty Dancing (full title: More Dirty Dancing: More Original Music from the Hit Motion Picture) is a follow-up album to the soundtrack to the 1987 film Dirty Dancing. It was released on March 4, 1988, by RCA Records, and made it to number three on both the US and the UK albums charts. "Do You Love Me", a 1962 Contours hit that features prominently in the film and appears on More Dirty Dancing, was re-issued as a single and became a hit for a second time, peaking at number eleven on the Billboard Hot 100 in August 1988.

David Handelman of Rolling Stone gave the album one star out of five, calling some of the tracks "instrumental idiocies". Stephen Thomas Erlewine of AllMusic gave it two out of five stars, saying that the follow-up contained "nothing more than a pleasant collection of oldies and faceless MOR adult contemporary pop".

== Track listing ==
1. "(I've Had) The Time of My Life (Instrumental Version)" (Note: Titled "Baby's Walk" on some releases.) (The John Morris Orchestra) – 0:37
2. "Big Girls Don't Cry" (The Four Seasons) – 2:25
3. "Merengue" (Michael Lloyd & Le Disc) – 2:16
4. "Some Kind of Wonderful" (The Drifters) – 2:33
5. "Johnny's Mambo" (Michael Lloyd & Le Disc) – 3:02
6. "Do You Love Me" (The Contours) – 2:49
7. "Love Man" (Otis Redding) – 2:14
8. "Wipe Out" (The Surfaris) – 2:12
9. "These Arms of Mine" (Redding) – 2:26
10. "De Todo un Poco" (Michael Lloyd & Le Disc) – 2:27
11. "Cry to Me" (Solomon Burke) – 2:23
12. "Trot the Fox" (Michael Lloyd & Le Disc) – 2:04
13. "Will You Love Me Tomorrow" (The Shirelles) – 2:39
14. "Kellerman's Anthem" (The Emile Bergstein Chorale) – 3:17
15. "(I've Had) The Time of My Life (Instrumental Version)" (Note: Titled "Lifts in the Lake Theme (Finale)" on some releases.) (The John Morris Orchestra) – 0:55

== Charts ==
=== Weekly charts ===
Chart (1988)	Peak position
Australia Albums (Kent Music Report)	9
Australian Albums (ARIA)	19
Austrian Albums (Ö3 Austria)	1
Canada Top Albums/CDs (RPM)	3
Dutch Albums (Album Top 100)	4
European Albums (Music & Media)	4
German Albums (Offizielle Top 100)	1
New Zealand Albums (RMNZ)	9
Swedish Albums (Sverigetopplistan)	28
Swiss Albums (Schweizer Hitparade)	1
UK Albums (Official Charts)	3
US Billboard 200	3

- Note: The Kent Music Report was the official Australian charts until June 1988. This was succeeded by the ARIA Charts. During this albums run, it appeared on both charts.

Chart (2005)	Peak position
UK Soundtrack Albums (Official Charts)	9

=== Year-end chart ===
Chart (1988)	Position
Austrian Albums (Ö3 Austria)	6
Canada Top Albums/CDs (RPM)	18
Dutch Albums (Album Top 100)	49
European Albums (Music & Media)	13
German Albums (Offizielle Top 100)	4
Swiss Albums (Schweizer Hitparade)	11
UK Albums (OCC)	45
US Billboard 200	18

== Certifications and sales ==
Region	Certification	Certified units/sales
Austria	—	50,000
Canada (Music Canada)	3× Platinum	300,000^{^}
France (SNEP)	Gold	100,000^{*}
Germany (BVMI)	Platinum	500,000^{^}
Netherlands (NVPI)	Gold	50,000^{^}
New Zealand (RMNZ)	Gold	7,500^{^}
Spain (Promusicae)	Platinum	100,000^{^}
Switzerland (IFPI Switzerland)	Platinum	50,000^{^}
United Kingdom (BPI)	Platinum	300,000^{^}
United States (RIAA)	4× Platinum	4,000,000^{^}
^{*} Sales figures based on certification alone.^{^} Shipments figures based on certification alone.
