= Emotion (Samantha Sang song) =

1977 single by Samantha Sang

- A-side label of the Australian single

Single by Samantha Sang

from the album Emotion
- B-side: "When Love Is Gone"
- Released: November 1977
- Recorded: April 1977
- Studio: Criteria (Miami, Florida)
- Genre: Disco
- Length: 3:57
- Label: Private Stock
- Songwriters: Barry Gibb; Robin Gibb
- Producer: Gibb-Galuten-Richardson

Samantha Sang singles chronology
"Can't You Hear the Music of My Love Song?" (1975)	"Emotion" (1977)	"You Keep Me Dancing" (1978)

Audio
- "Emotion" on YouTube

"Emotion" is a song written by Barry and Robin Gibb. It was first recorded by Australian singer Samantha Sang, whose version reached number three on the Billboard Hot 100 chart in 1978. The Bee Gees recorded their own version of the song in 1994, which was not first released until their 2001 collection titled Their Greatest Hits: The Record. In 1998, Regine Velasquez recorded a version of it for her R&B album Drawn. The album sold over 40,000 copies in just two weeks, instantly clearing the benchmark for an official Platinum certification. In 2001, "Emotion" was covered by the American R&B girl group Destiny's Child for their album Survivor. Their version of the song was an international hit, reaching the top ten on the US Hot 100 chart and peaking in the top five on the UK Singles Chart. English singer Emma Bunton also covered the song on her 2019 album My Happy Place.

== Original version ==
=== Background ===
Originally, "Emotion" was recorded by Samantha Sang for the Private Stock label. The song was Sang's only hit single, reaching number 3 on the Billboard Hot 100. Billboard ranked her version as the No. 14 song for 1978. There is a promotional video made for this song.

When Sang arrived at Criteria Studios in Miami, Florida, instead of recording "(Our Love) Don't Throw it All Away", Barry Gibb offered her a new song called "Emotion". On this track, Sang sticks to a breathy, Gibb-like sound. Gibb himself provided harmony and background vocals in his signature falsetto. The B-side was "When Love Is Gone", a Francis Lai composition recorded around April 1977 at Criteria, around the same time that Gibb wrote and produced "Save Me, Save Me" for the band Network.

Blue Weaver identified the musicians as shown from memory. On the session, Joey Murcia plays guitar, George Bitzer on keyboards, Harold Cowart on bass and Ron "Tubby" Zeigler on drums. It was originally intended for use in the 1977 film Saturday Night Fever, but ended up being featured in the film The Stud (1978) starring Joan Collins. Also in 1978, "Emotion" was used as the B-side of Johnny Mathis and Deniece Williams's single "Too Much, Too Little, Too Late", which reached number one in the US.

=== Personnel ===
- Samantha Sang – vocals
- Barry Gibb – harmony and background vocals
- George Terry – guitar
- Joey Murcia – guitar
- George Bitzer – keyboards, Fender Rhodes Electric Piano
- Harold Cowart – bass
- Ron Zeigler – drums
- Karl Richardson – engineering

=== Track listings and format ===
1. "Emotion" – 3:43
2. "When Love Is Gone" – 3:46

=== Charts ===
==== Weekly charts ====
Weekly chart performance for "Emotion"
Chart (1977–1978)	Peak position
Argentina	9
Australia (Kent Music Report)	2
Canada Top Singles (RPM)	1
Canada Adult Contemporary (RPM)	3
Ireland (IRMA)	9
Netherlands (Dutch Top 40)	32
New Zealand (Recorded Music NZ)	1
Sweden (Sverigetopplistan)	18
UK Singles (Official Charts)	11
US Billboard Hot 100	3
US Billboard Adult Contemporary	5
US Cash Box Top 100	1

==== Year-end charts ====
Year-end chart performance for "Emotion"
Chart (1978)	Peak position
Australia (Kent Music Report)	13
Canada Top Singles (RPM)	19
New Zealand (Recorded Music NZ)	20
UK Singles (OCC)	60
US Billboard Hot 100	14
US Cash Box Top 100	8

=== Certifications and sales ===
Region	Certification	Certified units/sales
Australia (ARIA)	Gold	50,000^{^}
United States (RIAA)	Platinum	2,000,000^{^}
^{^} Shipments figures based on certification alone.

== Destiny's Child version ==
"Emotion"

Single by Destiny's Child

from the album Survivor
- B-side: "8 Days of Christmas"
- Released: 4 September 2001
- Studio: SugarHill (Houston); The Enterprise (Burbank)
- Length: 3:55
- Label: Columbia
- Songwriters: Barry Gibb; Robin Gibb
- Producers: Beyoncé Knowles; Mark Feist; Mathew Knowles

Destiny's Child singles chronology
"Bootylicious" (2001)	"Emotion" (2001)	"8 Days of Christmas" (2001)

Music video
- "Emotion" on YouTube

=== Recording and production ===
In 2001, "Emotion" was recorded by American group Destiny's Child for their third studio album Survivor (2001). Produced and arranged by Mark J. Feist, it features a slower tempo than the original, although a more uptempo remix produced by Neptunes was also produced and included on the group's remix album This Is The Remix (2002). Feist had previously produced the song for Filipino singer Regine Velasquez for her album Drawn in 1998 and used exactly the same backing track for Destiny's Child.

=== Release and promotion ===
"Emotion" was released as the third single from Survivor on 4 September 2001 by Columbia Records. The song was heavily played on radio stations during the aftermath of the September 11 attacks and eventually became a tribute song to the family of the victims. The group also paid tribute to R&B singer Aaliyah, who died in an August 2001 plane crash, at the 2001 Soul Train Lady of Soul Awards by performing the song. Several international formats of "Emotion" contain "8 Days of Christmas" as a B-side, which previously appeared on the US maxi CD single of "Independent Women Part I" (2000). In 2002, the group performed the song with Celine Dion on her television special, A New Day Has Come.

=== Commercial performance ===
"Emotion" continued Destiny's Child's streak of top-10 hits in the United States, peaking at number ten on the Billboard Hot 100 on 1 December 2001. It was also a hit in the United Kingdom, where it peaked at number three on the UK Singles Chart and sold over 145,000 copies. Internationally, it reached the top 10 in several major music markets, including Ireland, the Netherlands, and New Zealand.

=== Music video ===
The song's accompanying music video, directed by Francis Lawrence, featured a triple split-screen effect. Kelly Rowland appears on the left, Beyoncé Knowles in the centre, and Michelle Williams on the right. Rowland is seen saying goodbye to her boyfriend before he leaves in a taxi. Knowles catches her boyfriend with another woman and runs around the house in tears. Williams is with her grandmother, who has died in her bed. At the end of the video Williams calls the other group members to her home. The three girls meet there and comfort each other. The screen then returns to normal.

The music clip is featured as an enhanced video on the European editions of the CD single and on the 2004 Walmart-exclusive DVD titled Fan Pack.

=== Track listings ===
UK CD1

1. "Emotion" (album version) – 3:56
2. "8 Days of Christmas" (album version) – 3:29
3. "Emotion" (Maurice's Nu Soul mix) – 7:55
4. "Emotion" (video)

UK CD2

1. "Emotion" (The Neptunes main mix) – 4:15
2. "Bootylicious" (Rockwilder remix) – 4:13
3. "Emotion" (Jameson full vocal remix) – 6:19
4. "Bootylicious" (Rockwilder remix video version)

UK cassette single

1. "Emotion" (album version) – 3:56
2. "Emotion" (Calderone AM mix) – 10:13

European CD1

1. "Emotion" (album version) – 3:56
2. "8 Days of Christmas" – 3:29

European CD2

1. "Emotion" (album version) – 3:56
2. "8 Days of Christmas" – 3:29
3. "Emotion" (Calderone dub mix) – 6:55
4. "Emotion" (video) – 3:56

Australian and New Zealand CD single

1. "Emotion" (Maurice's Nu Soul mix edit) – 4:00
2. "8 Days of Christmas" (album version) – 3:29
3. "Emotion" (The Neptunes remix) – 4:15
4. "Emotion" (Erroll McCalla remix) – 3:58
5. "Emotion" (Calderone AM mix) – 10:13

Japanese CD single

1. "Emotion" (album version)
2. "Emotion" (Maurice's Nu Soul mix)
3. "Emotion" (instrumental)
4. "Emotion" (a cappella)

=== Charts ===
==== Weekly charts ====
Chart (2001–2002)	Peak position
Australia (ARIA)	17
Australian Urban (ARIA)	10
Austria (Ö3 Austria Top 40)	28
Belgium (Ultratop 50 Flanders)	19
Belgium (Ultratop 50 Wallonia)	30
Canada (Nielsen SoundScan)	11
Canada CHR (Nielsen BDS)	6
Europe (European Hot 100 Singles)	10
France (SNEP)	61
Germany (GfK)	21
Hungary (MAHASZ)	7
Ireland (IRMA)	9
Italy (FIMI)	38
Netherlands (Dutch Top 40)	7
Netherlands (Single Top 100)	10
New Zealand (Recorded Music NZ)	2
Norway (VG-lista)	6
Portugal (AFP)	8
Romania (Romanian Top 100)	34
Scottish Singles Sales (Official Charts)	7
South Africa (RISA)	4
Sweden (Sverigetopplistan)	14
Switzerland (Schweizer Hitparade)	21
UK Singles (Official Charts)	3
UK Hip Hop/R&B (Official Charts)	3
US Billboard Hot 100	10
US Adult Contemporary (Billboard)	23
US Dance Club Songs (Billboard)	10
US Hot R&B/Hip-Hop Songs (Billboard)	28
US Pop Airplay (Billboard)	8
US Rhythmic Airplay (Billboard)	12

==== Year-end charts ====
Chart (2001)	Position
Canada (Nielsen SoundScan)	174
Ireland (IRMA)	91
Netherlands (Dutch Top 40)	54
Netherlands (Single Top 100)	66
Sweden (Hitlistan)	88
UK Singles (OCC)	117
US Mainstream Top 40 (Billboard)	84
US Rhythmic Top 40 (Billboard)	88

Chart (2002)	Position
Brazil (Crowley)	85
US Rhythmic Top 40 (Billboard)	61

=== Certifications ===
Region	Certification	Certified units/sales
Australia (ARIA)	Gold	35,000^{^}
New Zealand (RMNZ)	Gold	15,000^{‡}
South Africa (RISA)	Gold	25,000
United Kingdom (BPI)	Silver	200,000^{‡}
^{^} Shipments figures based on certification alone.^{‡} Sales+streaming figures based on certification alone.

=== Release history ===
Release dates and formats for "Emotion"
Region	Date	Format(s)	Label(s)	Ref.
United States	4 September 2001	Contemporary hit radio; rhythmic contemporary radio; urban contemporary radio	Columbia	
Australia	8 October 2001	Maxi CD	Sony Music	
United States	8 October 2001	Adult contemporary radio	Columbia	
France	15 October 2001	Maxi CD	Sony Music	
Japan	17 October 2001	Maxi CD	Sony	
New Zealand	22 October 2001	CD	Sony Music	
Germany	30 October 2001	CD; maxi CD	Sony Music	
United Kingdom	12 November 2001	Cassette; two maxi CDs	Columbia	
France	19 November 2001	12-inch vinyl	Sony Music	
France	4 March 2002	CD	Sony Music	
