= Tonight You're Mine =

Studio album by Eric Carmen
- Released: June 1980
- Studios: Cherokee (Hollywood, California); Allen Zentz (San Clemente, California)
- Genre: Soft rock
- Length: 33:45
- Label: Arista
- Producer: Harry Maslin

Eric Carmen chronology
Change of Heart (1978)	Tonight You're Mine (1980)	Eric Carmen (1984)

Singles from Tonight You're Mine
- 1. "It Hurts Too Much" Released: July 1980

Professional ratings
Review scores
Source	Rating
AllMusic	1.5/5 stars

Tonight You're Mine is an album by Eric Carmen, released in 1980. It peaked at No. 160 on the Billboard album chart. It contained the singles "It Hurts Too Much" (No. 75 US Billboard Hot 100 and number three in South Africa) and "All for Love". The album debuted on the Billboard Top 200 Albums chart on June 28, 1980.

== Track listing ==
All tracks composed by Eric Carmen.

1. "It Hurts Too Much" - 4:09
2. "Lost in the Shuffle" - 4:00
3. "All for Love" - 3:59
4. "Tonight You're Mine" - 3:59
5. "Sleep with Me" - 4:01
6. "Inside Story" - 3:37
7. "Foolin' Myself" - 5:33
8. "You Need Some Lovin'" - 4:02

== Personnel ==
- Eric Carmen – lead vocals, arrangements, electric guitar (1), backing vocals (6), acoustic piano (7)
- Duane Hitchings – acoustic piano (1–6, 8), synthesizers (1)
- Billy Peek – electric guitar (1, 2, 6), guitar solo (2), rhythm guitar (8)
- Davey Johnstone – acoustic guitar (1, 4), electric guitar (2, 4, 6), backing vocals (4, 6)
- Fred Tackett – acoustic guitar (1, 4, 6), guitars (3, 5)
- Steve Lukather – lead guitar (8)
- Kenny Passarelli – bass (1, 2, 4, 6–8)
- Bob Glaub – bass (3, 5)
- Carmine Appice – drums (1, 2, 4, 6, 8)
- Rick Shlosser – drums (3, 5, 7)
- Paulinho da Costa – percussion (1, 4)
- Harry Maslin – percussion (3, 5)
- David Woodford – saxophone (1, 6)
- Calvin H. Biggar – bagpipes (4)
- Angus MacKay – bagpipes (4)
- David Stanley Moyle – bagpipes (4)
- Argyle Watterston – bagpipes (4)
- Barry Fasman – string arrangements (1, 3, 5, 7)
- Laura Creamer – backing vocals (1, 4)
- Jim Haas – backing vocals (1, 3, 4)
- Jon Joyce – backing vocals (1, 4)
- Dee Dee Maslin and the Shuflettes – backing vocals (2)
- Steve Farber – backing vocals (3)
- Joanne Harris – backing vocals (3)

Production

- Harry Maslin – producer, engineer, mixing
- Rick Ash – assistant engineer
- Frank D'Amico – assistant engineer
- Sheridan Eldridge – assistant engineer
- Bill Thomas – assistant engineer
- John Van Nest – assistant engineer
- Ria Lewerke-Shapiro – art direction, design, photography

== Weekly charts ==
Chart (1980)	Peak position
Australian Albums (Kent Music Report)	80
US Billboard 200	160
