= Samantha Sang =

Australian singer (born 1951)

- Also known as: Cheryl Gray
- Born: Cheryl Lau Sang; 5 August 1951 (age 75); Melbourne, Victoria, Australia
- Genres: Disco; pop
- Occupation: Singer
- Instrument: Vocals
- Years active: 1966–1981; 1999; 2004; 2007
- Labels: His Master's Voice; Private Stock; United Artists; EMI; Odeon; Sutra

Cheryl Lau Sang (born 5 August 1951), known professionally as Samantha Sang, is an Australian singer. She had an earlier career as a teenage singer under the stage name Cheryl Gray, before adopting the stage name she is more widely known as in 1969. She first received nationwide recognition in Australia in 1967, after releasing the top ten single "You Made Me What I Am".

By 1969, Sang relocated to the United Kingdom, where she worked with the Bee Gees, before returning to Australia in 1975. She reconnected with the Bee Gees in 1977 and had an international hit with its song "Emotion", which peaked at number three on the Billboard Hot 100, number two in Australia, and number eleven in the United Kingdom. The single's parent album, Emotion (1978), reached the top thirty on Billboard 200 and included two other singles.

== Life and career ==
=== Early life ===
Sang was born to Reg and Joan (née Clarke) Sang in Melbourne, Australia, the great-great-granddaughter of a Chinese herbalist and surgeon. Both parents were 1940s Radio Revue singers. Her father ran a singing school and performed professionally as Reg Gray. Sang began her career at the age of eight, as Cheryl Gray, by singing on Australian radio and entered and won talent contests. Her first performance on television was at the age of eleven.

=== 1966-1974: First recordings ===
In December 1966, she released her debut single, "The Real Thing" (not to be confused with fellow Australian Russell Morris' 1969 hit song "The Real Thing"), under the name "Cheryl Gray". It was issued by EMI Records on its His Master's Voice label and was quickly followed by her second single, "In a Woman's Eyes".

Her third single, "You Made Me What I Am", was released in May 1967 and reached number eight on the Go-Set Top 40. Teen magazine, Go-Set ran a poll in August for pop performers and Gray was voted third in the 'Top Girl Singer' category behind Lynne Randell and Bev Harrell. Sang released three more singles on His Master's Voice but none charted. She became a singer on Australian television, but she felt her career was limited if she remained in Australia. In 1969, Sang travelled to the United Kingdom where Barry Gibb of the Bee Gees heard her singing and urged his manager, Robert Stigwood, to sign her. Under Stigwood's management she changed her name to "Samantha Sang". Gibb co-wrote "Love of a Woman" with his brother Maurice. Sang's version – with Barry Gibb supplying backing vocals, guitar and producing – was released in August. It was a minor hit in some European countries.

Sang followed with "Nothing in the World Like Love" written by UK pop singer-songwriter Labi Siffre. Visa restrictions forced her out of the UK and she returned to Australia.

=== 1975-1990s: Mainstream success ===
By 1975, Sang changed management and signed with Polydor, which released three singles and her debut album, Samantha Sang and Rocked the World.

In 1977, she recorded "When Love Is Gone", the theme song of the French drama film Bilitis.

She visited Barry Gibb in France while the Bee Gees were recording songs for the Saturday Night Fever soundtrack. A new song, "Emotion", was written for her by Barry and Robin Gibb. The single was co-produced by Barry with the Bee Gees' production team of Albhy Galuten and Karl Richardson. Released in 1978, with backing vocals by Barry, it showcased a softer style and became a major hit worldwide. It reached number three on the US Billboard Hot 100 in March 1978, and earned a platinum record. It peaked at number eleven on the UK Singles Chart and at number two on the Australian Kent Music Report Singles Chart.

Her following album, Emotion, although not produced by Barry Gibb, included a version of "Charade", a little-known Bee Gees' song from its 1974 album Mr. Natural. Emotion peaked at No. 29 on the Billboard 200 and achieved a gold record in March 1978. Determined to succeed on her own merits, Sang did not record another Gibb song to capitalise on her success, but she chose a disco track, "You Keep Me Dancing", as her next single. It peaked at No. 56 on the US Hot 100 (NZ # 21, Canada AC #10) and was followed into the charts by her cover of Wilson Pickett's "In the Midnight Hour".

She recorded a cover of Eric Carmen's top-20 single "Change of Heart", featured as the B-side of "You Keep Me Dancing". Her third album, From Dance to Love, was released by United Artists in 1979.

=== 1999-present: Later years ===
In 1999, residing again in Melbourne, Sang made a short return to live performing, with her father Reg as guest vocalist. In 2004, Sang's three albums were released for the first time on CD in a two-piece set as the compilation The Ultimate Collection.

== Discography ==
=== Studio albums ===
List of albums, with selected details and chart positions
Title	Album details	Peak chart positions
Title	Album details	AUS
Samantha Sang and Rocked the World	Released: 1975; Label: Polydor (2907 019); Format: LP	—
Emotion	Released: 1978; Label: Private Stock (PS 7009); Format: LP, cassette	35
From Dance to Love	Released: 1979; Label: United Artists, Festival (L 36950); Format: LP, cassette	—
And the World Listened	Released: 2008; Label: SS Music (NEW3243.2); Format: CD	—

=== Compilation albums ===
Title	Details
The Ultimate Collection	Released: 2007; Format: 2×CD; Label: SS Music (SS 5853)

=== Singles ===
List of singles, with selected chart positions
Year	Title	Peak chart positions			Certification	Album
Year	Title	AUS	UK	US	Certification	Album
1969	"The Love of a Woman"	—	—	—		Non-album singles
1972	"Nothing in the World Like Love"	—	—	—		Non-album singles
1972	"It's Been Raining Every Day Since Monday"	—	—	—		Non-album singles
1974	"It Could Have Been"	—	—	—		Samantha Sang and Rocked the World
1975	"Can't You Hear the Music of My Love Song"	—	—	—		Samantha Sang and Rocked the World
1977	"Emotion"	2	11	3	AUS: Gold	Emotion
1978	"You Keep Me Dancing"	40	—	56		Emotion
1979	"I Can Still Remember"	—	—	—		From Dance to Love
1979	"In the Midnight Hour"	—	—	88		From Dance to Love
1979	"From Dance to Love"	—	—	—		From Dance to Love
1981	"Let's Start Again" (featuring Robert Delon)	—	—	—		Non-album single

== Awards and nominations ==
=== Go-Set Pop Poll ===
The Go-Set Pop Poll was coordinated by teen-oriented pop-music newspaper Go-Set and was established in February 1966, which conducted an annual poll from 1966 to 1972 of its readers to determine the most popular personalities.

Year	Nominee / work	Award	Result
1967	herself (Cheryl Gray)	Top Female Singer	3rd
1968	herself (Cheryl Gray)	Top Female Singer	5th

TELEVISION

Title	Year	Performance	Type
1967	The Go!! Show	Herself as Cheryl Gray	TV series, 8 episodes
1969	The Rolf Harris Show	Herself as Cheryl Gray	TV series, 1 episode
1969	The Tommy Leonetti Show	Herself	TV series
1970	In Melbourne Tonight	Herself sings "Nothing Can Stop Me Now" / "To Love Somebody"	TV series, 2 episodes
1970	In Melbourne Tonight	Herself sings "The Love Of A Woman"	TV series, 1 episode
1972	Kamahl	Herself	TV series, 1 episode
1972-1975	The Graham Kennedy Show	Herself sings "Resurrection Shuffle"	TV series, 4 episodes
1973	The Graham Kennedy Show	Herself sings "This Is My Life (La Vita)"	TV series, 1 episode
1973	The Graham Kennedy Show	Herself sings "Didn't We"	TV series, 1 episode
1974	It's Magic	Guest Performer	TV series, 1 episode
1974-1976	The Ernie Sigley Show	Herself	TV series, 4 episodes
1975	The Ernie Sigley Show	Herself sings "Can't You Hear The Music Of My Love Song"	TV series, 1 episode
1975;1978	Countdown	Herself sings "You Made Me What I Am"	ABC TV series, 3 episodes
1975	The Graham Kennedy Show	Herself sings "You Made Me What I Am"	TV series, 1 episode
1975	The Ernie Sigley Show	Herself sings "Land Of A Thousand Dances"	TV series, 1 episode
1975	Samantha Sang And Rocked The World	Herself	TV special
1977	Countdown Silver Jubilee Show	Herself	ABC TV special
1977	The Celebrity Cabaret	Herself sings "Emotion" / "Where The Love Has Gone"	TV special, US
1978	Dick Clark's American Bandstand	Herself	TV series US, 1 episode
1978-1979	The Mike Douglas Show	Herself - Singer	TV series US, 3 episodes
1978	The Mike Walsh Show	Guest - Herself	TV series, 1 episode
1978	Top Of The Pops	Herself sings "Emotion"	TV series UK, 1 episode
1978	Thank You, Rock 'N' Roll: A Tribute To Alan Freed	Herself sings "Emotion"	TV special, US
1978	Countdown	Herself - Co-host sings "Midnight Hour"	ABC TV series, 1 episode
1978, 1979	The Mike Walsh Show	Guest - Herself	TV series, 1 episode
1978	Australian Music To The World	Herself	TV special
1979	The Merv Griffin Show	Herself	TV series US, 1 episode
1979	The Mike Walsh Show	Guest - Herself	TV series, 1 episode
1982	Telethon 1982	Guest - Herself	TV special
1989; 1989	The Bert Newton Show	Herself sings "Old Man River"	TV series, 1 episode
1989; 1989	The Bert Newton Show	Herself sings "I've Got My Song To Sing"	TV series, 1 episode
1989; 1989	The Bert Newton Show	Herself sings "Resurrection Shuffle"	TV series, 1 episode
1989	In Melbourne Today	Guest - Herself	TV series, 1 episode
1989	The Bert Newton Show	Herself sings "Waiting For The Last Goodbye"	TV series, 1 episode
1999;2000	Good Morning Australia	Herself sings "How Am I Supposed To Live Without You"	TV series, 1 episode
2000	Good Morning Australia	Herself sings "Resurrection Shuffle"	TV series, 1 episode
2008	Wrok Down	Herself	TV series, 1 episode
