= Eric Carmen (1984 album) =

Studio album by Eric Carmen
- Released: January 7, 1985
- Genre: Rock
- Length: 48:19
- Label: Geffen
- Producer: Bob Gaudio: Don Gehman

Eric Carmen chronology
| Tonight You're Mine (1980) | Eric Carmen (1985) | I Was Born to Love You (2000) |

Professional ratings
Review scores
| Source | Rating |
|---|---|
| AllMusic | 2/5 stars |

Eric Carmen is the fifth album by rock and roll musician Eric Carmen. It was also his second self-titled LP after the 1975 album of the same name. The album spent ten weeks on the U.S. Billboard album charts and reached its peak position of No. 128 in early March 1985.

== Release ==
It contained one Top 40 hit single, "I Wanna Hear It from Your Lips," which peaked at #35 on the Billboard Hot 100 in the same month. The song was also a medium adult contemporary hit in both the United States (#10) and Canada (#17). "Spotlight" was featured as the B side of the 45 RPM.

"I'm Through With Love" was a minor follow-up hit in the U.S., reaching #87 on Billboard Hot 100.

In 2016, the album was reissued on Varese Vintage, and featured as bonus tracks the 7" Single remix and the 12" version of "I Wanna Hear It From Your Lips".

In 1985, country singer Louise Mandrell covered "Maybe My Baby." Her version reached #8 on the U.S. Country singles chart.

== Track listing ==
All songs written and arranged by Eric Carmen except where indicated.

1. "I Wanna Hear It from Your Lips" (Carmen, Dean Pitchford) – 3:17
2. "I'm Through with Love" – 4:04
3. "American as Apple Pie" (Carmen, Dean Pitchford) – 3:46
4. "Living Without Your Love" (Michael Bolton, Doug James) – 4:07
5. "Come Back to My Love" (Bob Gaudio, Jerry Corbetta, John Bettis) – 3:38
6. "She Remembered" - 4:31
7. "You Took Me All the Way" – 3:36
8. "Maybe My Baby" – 3:39
9. "Spotlight" – 4:13
10. "The Way We Used to Be" – 3:16

== Personnel ==
- Eric Carmen – lead and backing vocals, acoustic piano, keyboards, synthesizers, harpsichord, guitars, drums, arrangements
- Richard Reising – synthesizers, harpsichord, guitars, backing vocals
- George Sipl – keyboards, synthesizers, organ, backing vocals
- Dan Hrdlicka – guitars, backing vocals
- Steve Knill – bass, backing vocals
- Dwight Krueger – drums, percussion, backing vocals
- Michael McBride – drums, percussion, backing vocals

== Production ==
- Bob Gaudio – producer (1, 2, 5–10)
- Don Gehman – remixing (1, 2, 7), producer (3, 4), engineer
- Jim Bell – engineer
- Tony D'Amico – engineer
- Dale Peters – engineer
- Arnie Rosenberg – engineer
- Michael Wagener – mixing (6)
- Greg Fulginiti – mastering at Artisan Sound Recorders (Hollywood, California)
- Elaine Black – production coordinator
- Roz Schrank – production coordinator
- Tommy Steele – art direction, design
- Victoria Pearson – photography

=== 2016 reissue ===
- Bob Gaudio – producer
- Cary E. Mansfeld – producer
- Bill Pitzonka – producer, art direction
- Larry R. Watts – producer, liner notes
- Don Gehman – remixing (11)
- John "Jellybean" Benitez – remixing (12)
- Michael Hutchinson – mixing (12)
- Melanie West – assistant engineer (12)
- Chas Ferry – CD mastering
- Jimmy Bralower – additional drum programming (12)
- Bashiri Johnson – percussion (12)

== Charts ==
=== Weekly charts ===
| Chart (1985) | Peak position |
|---|---|
| US Billboard 200 | 128 |
