= Sunrise (Eric Carmen song) =

1975 song by Eric Carmen

Single by Eric Carmen

from the album Eric Carmen
- B-side: "My Girl"
- Released: August 1976
- Recorded: 1975
- Genre: Soft rock
- Length: 5:21 (Album Version); 3:37 (Single Version)
- Label: Arista
- Songwriter: Eric Carmen
- Producer: Jimmy Ienner

Eric Carmen singles chronology
"That's Rock 'n' Roll" (1976)	"Sunrise" (1976)	"She Did It" (1977)

"Sunrise" is a song written by Eric Carmen that was first released on Carmen's 1975 album Eric Carmen. It was also released as a single and reached #34 on the Billboard Hot 100.

== Lyrics and music ==
Star News critic Michael Jensen said that the lyrics are "meaningful, and yet they don't waste a lot of words to describe a happening or a feeling," and that they "make Carmen's music enjoyable and worthwhile."

Classic Rock History critic Brian Kachejian described the beginning of the song as an "intense instrumental full of strings" which, after a guitar solo, proceeds into a "happy rock and roll track in Eric Carmen’s style." Kachejian also noted that song ends with the same chords as Elton John's "Love Lies Bleeding".

Saturday Enquirer and Ledger critic Jim Houston said that the "musical intro...can only be described as the musical equivalent of a sunrise." The Marquette Upper Peninsula Catholic described "Sunrise" as follows:

Listening to "Sunrise" by Eric Carmen is the next best thing to watching one. At the beginning the music sets the mood for waiting. You can almost feel the strain of creation giving birth to another day. Then the music shifts to the triumphant sound of a new day begun.

Reviewing the Eric Carmen album, Oshkosh Advance Titan critic Christopher Lalley felt that "Sunrise" didn't really fit with the rest of the album because "it has a foreboding, gothic beginning with a middle and end that seems totally unrelated to its start." Lalley felt it sounded more like a song from Carmen's previous group, the Raspberries. Winston-Salem Journal critic Jim Shertzer felt it sounded like the Beach Boys.

== Reception ==
Cash Box said of "Sunrise" that "There's a beautiful introduction, with horns and everything, and then the music breaks into some serious rock ’n’ roll. Carmen's voice is in top form, and he makes the melody soar." Billboard said of it that Carmen's "wonderfully unmistakable sad tenor voice attacks an uptempo lyric message this time and produces the effect of a breaking heart desperately winning through to an optimistic outlook. The melody and production are a sleek counterpoint to Carmen's emotional singing." Record World called it a "robust song that highlights [Carmen's] concert performances."

Springfield Leader and Press critic Bob Linder called it an "exceptionally fine cut." Montreal Star contributor John Kearney described it as a "snap, crackle and pop rocker." St. Joseph News-Press critic Terry Jordan called Carmen's vocal work "stunning."

Kachejian rated "Sunrise" to be Carmen's 4th greatest solo song, particularly praising the "great" guitar solo. Chaospin critic Linda Giantino rated it Carmen's 10th greatest solo song, also praising the guitar solo as well as the "incredible depth in the lyrics."
