= Make Me Lose Control (song) =

- Common variant of standard artwork

Single by Eric Carmen

from the album The Best of Eric Carmen
- B-side: "That's Rock 'n' Roll"
- Released: May 21, 1988
- Recorded: 1987
- Genre: Soft rock
- Length: 4:47
- Label: Arista
- Songwriters: Eric Carmen, Dean Pitchford
- Producer: Jimmy Ienner

Eric Carmen singles chronology
"Hungry Eyes" (1987)	"Make Me Lose Control" (1988)	"Reason to Try" (1988)

"Make Me Lose Control" is a song written and performed by singer-songwriter Eric Carmen and co-written with Dean Pitchford. It is one of two major hits written by the duo, the other being the 1984 song "Almost Paradise" by Mike Reno and Ann Wilson. "Make Me Lose Control" reached No. 3 on the Billboard Hot 100 in 1988, Carmen's final top 40 hit on the pop charts.

The song was featured on the official soundtrack of the 2024 Marvel Cinematic Universe film Deadpool & Wolverine.

== Background ==
Carmen stated in the liner notes to a compilation album that "Make Me Lose Control" was an "odd record because it was all by itself. The song wasn't part of an album, but it was an interesting experience to jump back into the studio with Jimmy Ienner after ten years". The B-side was Carmen's original 1975 recording of his song which became a major hit in 1977 for Shaun Cassidy, "That's Rock 'n' Roll".

"Make Me Lose Control" did not originally appear on any of Carmen's studio albums; the song later surfaced on various greatest hits releases. In keeping with its nostalgic feel, the richness of harmony, and underlying yearning for the "sweet songs" of the 1950s and 1960s, references are made to four other songs from that era and another from the 1970s: "Uptown" by the Crystals, "Stand by Me" by Ben E. King, "Be My Baby" by the Ronettes, and "Back in My Arms Again" by the Supremes.

Classic Rock History critic Brian Kachejian rated it to be Carmen's 6th greatest solo song, stating that "The song’s Drifters meets Phil Spector sound proved quite a success for Eric Carmen in 1988." Chaospin critic Linda Giantino rated it Carmen's 9th greatest solo song, stating that "it’s up there among his most catchy tunes."

The song was featured on an episode of the American TV show Dexter.

== Music video ==
The music video was produced by Paul Flattery and directed by Jim Yukich of FYI. It features Kid Leo, a radio personality who got his start in Cleveland, Carmen's hometown. The video refers to the film American Graffiti by re-creating the scene in which the blonde in the white T-Bird (Suzanne Somers) tells Curt (Richard Dreyfuss) "I love you", and his near-misses with her after that. In the video, a mysterious young blonde pulls up beside Carmen's car and tells him, "I love you." Like Curt, Carmen only sees a T-Bird in passing for the remainder of the video. Cast in the video was actress Annette Sinclair, who had just been divorced from rock singer Bob Seger, whom she had married in 1987.

Also in the video, Kid Leo is seen throwing darts at a poster of fellow radio personality Scott Shannon. Shannon had just left highly successful Z100 (WHTZ) in New York to take over at brand new Pirate Radio (KQLZ) in Los Angeles, and irked a lot of L.A. radio personalities when he said he was going to "revolutionize" the medium. Kid Leo was a last minute replacement for Shannon, who'd been booked to do the DJ segment, but dropped out.

Pirate Radio, which played a mix of hard rock and pop while its hosts had a brash style of presentation, did well in its debut in 1989, but fizzled out after just two years. Shannon eventually went back to New York, and was co-host of the morning show on WPLJ for the next 23 years.

== Chart performance ==
Released a few months after the success of Carmen's song from the film Dirty Dancing, "Hungry Eyes", which peaked at No. 4 on the Billboard Hot 100 chart, "Make Me Lose Control" would reach the top 5 on the Hot 100 during the summer of 1988, peaking at No. 3 on the chart dating August 13. On the Sales chart, the song spent a week at No. 1, while on the Airplay chart, it reached No. 4. It spent 13 weeks at the top 40. In addition, "Make Me Lose Control" spent three weeks at No. 1 on the Adult Contemporary chart, the singer's second song to do so (following "Never Gonna Fall in Love Again" from 1976). It was Carmen's second to last charting hit and his final to chart inside the top 40.

== Charts ==
=== Weekly singles charts ===
Chart (1988)	Peak position
Australia (Kent Music Report)	8
Canada Top Singles (RPM)	2
Canadian RPM Adult Contemporary	1
New Zealand (RIANZ)	29
South Africa (Springbok)	22
UK Singles (Official Charts)	93
US Billboard Hot 100	3
US Adult Contemporary (Billboard)	1
U.S. Cash Box Top 100	4

=== Year-end charts ===
Chart (1988)	Position
Australia	46
Canada RPM Top Singles	27
U.S. Billboard Hot 100	38
U.S. Billboard Adult Contemporary	6
U.S. Cash Box Hot 100	43
