= I Was Born to Love You (album) =

Studio album by Eric Carmen
- Released: 1998
- Label: Rhino
- Producer: Eric Carmen

Eric Carmen chronology
The Definitive Collection (1997)	I Was Born to Love You (1998)	All by Myself – The Best of Eric Carmen (1999)

Professional ratings
Review scores
Source	Rating
AllMusic	3/5 stars

I Was Born to Love You is the sixth and final album by American musician Eric Carmen. It was originally released in Japan under the title Winter Dreams in 1998 before being released in 2000 as I Was Born to Love You.

== Track listing ==
1. "I Was Born to Love You" (Eric Carmen, Andy Goldmark) - 4:31
2. "Someone That You Loved Before" (Eric Carmen, Diane Warren) - 4:03
3. "Every Time I Make Love to You" (Eric Carmen, Andy Goldmark, Steve Kipner) - 5:28
4. "Cartoon World" (Eric Carmen, John Wesley Harding) - 4:34
5. "Almost Paradise" (Eric Carmen, Dean Pitchford) - 4:22
6. "Top Down Summer" (Eric Carmen, Dean Pitchford) - 3:31
7. "Isn't It Romantic" (Eric Carmen, Andy Goldmark) - 3:58
8. "I Could Really Love You" (Eric Carmen, Dean Pitchford) - 3:15
9. "Caroline, No" (Japan release only) (Brian Wilson, Tony Asher) - 3:42
10. "I Wanna Take Forever Tonight" (Eric Carmen, Andy Goldmark) - 4:18
11. "Walk Away Renée" (Michael Brown, Bob Calilli, Tony Sansone) - 2:46

== Personnel ==
- Eric Carmen – vocals, instruments, backing vocals (6)
- Bruce Gaitsch – electric guitar (1, 2, 5), classical guitar (1, 7, 10), acoustic guitar (2, 5, 7, 9, 10)
- Wally Bryson – 12-string guitar (3), acoustic guitar (8), electric guitar (8)
- Daris Adkins – electric guitar (6)
- Dale Peters – bass (8)
- Alexandra Brown – backing vocals (2)
- Bridgette Bryant – backing vocals (2)
- Sue Ann Carwell – backing vocals (2)
- Janey Clewer – vocals (5), backing vocals (7)
- Jennifer Lee – backing vocals (6)

=== Production ===
- Eric Carmen – producer, arrangements
- Lee Mars – recording, mixing
