= John DeNicola =

American songwriter and producer

John DeNicola (born October 4, 1955) is an American songwriter and producer. He is best known for co-writing the song "(I've Had) The Time of My Life", for which he won both an Academy Award and a Golden Globe Award, as well as receiving a Grammy nomination, in 1988. In 1989 he was the co-winner of ASCAP Awards' "Most Performed Songs from Motion Pictures" for "Time of My Life" as well as for "Hungry Eyes", another song from the film. In addition to Dirty Dancing hits for Bill Medley, Jennifer Warnes and Eric Carmen, he has also written songs with and for Eddie Money, John Waite, Kristine W, Steve Holy, Jeannie Kendall, Sugar Jones, Annie Haslam, Bernie Worrell, The Sighs and Martin Briley.

== Songwriter and producer ==
A native of Amityville, New York and a longtime resident of Greenwich Village, DeNicola began his musical career as a bass player with "Flight", a band which recorded for Motown in 1980 and was sampled by Erikah Badu on her hit song "Back in the Day". He played with several other acts before changing his career. Although his songwriter portfolio includes music written for and performed by other artists, he is best known for his collaboration with Franke Previte and Donald Markowitz on the award-winning songs for Dirty Dancing.

DeNicola shared an imprint, Omad/Paradigm Records, through which he produced a number of albums, before creating his own studio, Jake's Kitchen Sink. Kara's Flowers, who went on to become Maroon 5, are among the artists he has produced for. In September 2019 John DeNicola released his debut album of songs he has written called "The Why Because" which include his synth pop version of "Hungry Eyes" and a stripped down acoustic guitar and brass section version of "I've Had The Time Of My Life". Also included is "In God's Shadow" which he wrote with John Waite, Anthony Krizan and lyrics by Keith Reid (Whiter Shade Of Pale) with Mickey Madden (Maroon 5) on bass. DeNicola continues to write songs and works with new musical talent. In 2021 John released his sophomore record She Said which contained 9 original songs he wrote for himself as an artist and two cover songs, "Morning Dew" and "Can't Find My Way Home"
