= She Did It =

1977 single by Eric Carmen

- US single picture sleeve

Single by Eric Carmen

from the album Boats Against the Current
- B-side: "Someday" (non-LP track)
- Released: August 1977
- Genre: Soft rock
- Length: 3:39 (single version); 3:48 (album version)
- Label: Arista
- Songwriter: Eric Carmen
- Producer: Eric Carmen

Eric Carmen singles chronology
"Sunrise" (1976)	"She Did It" (1977)	"Love Is All That Matters" (1977)

Audio video
- "She Did It" on YouTube

"She Did It" is a song written and originally recorded by Eric Carmen in 1977. Carmen's single was a Top 40 hit on the Billboard Hot 100 chart, reaching number 23. "She Did It" was covered in 1981 by actor and singer Michael Damian, who had a minor hit at number 69 on the Hot 100 with his version.

== Eric Carmen version ==
=== Background and release ===
"She Did It" was first recorded and performed by Eric Carmen. Released in August 1977, it was the first and greatest hit on Carmen's second solo LP, Boats Against the Current. It reached number 23 on the Billboard Hot 100 chart, number 15 on the Cashbox Top 100, and number 11 in Canada.

This ballad is an upbeat love song about finally finding the right person and experiencing love after being lonely for an extended period of time. It is a contrast to Carmen's more melancholy hits the year before, "All By Myself" and "Never Gonna Fall in Love Again." It has been hailed as "the best Beach Boys song Brian Wilson never wrote."

Back-up vocals for "She Did It" were provided by Bruce Johnston and Brian Wilson of the Beach Boys, whose 1968 hit "Do It Again" is credited by Carmen with being the initial inspiration for the song because of the 'did-its'. "She Did It" also features Burton Cummings, formerly of the Guess Who, and a guitar solo by Andrew Gold ("Lonely Boy"), featuring his distinctive harmonized lead guitar sound, and drumming by Toto's Jeff Porcaro. Carmen has stated that "She Did It" was in turn a source of inspiration for another song, the 1982 hit "Did It in a Minute" by Hall & Oates, with whom he was touring at the time their song became a hit.

The 45 rpm cover sheath for "She Did It" was a black and white of the full-color photo taken for the album, with manuscript lettering instead of the cursive text which appeared on the cover of the LP. The B side, "Someday," was omitted from the "Boats" LP, but was placed on Carmen's follow-up album, Change of Heart.

Two other songs penned and recorded by Carmen, "That's Rock 'n' Roll" and "Hey Deanie", but made into hits by Shaun Cassidy, charted concurrently with "She Did It" in late 1977, reaching numbers three and seven, respectively.

On the Canadian singles chart, "She Did It" spent four consecutive weeks at number 11. One of the songs blocking it from entering the Top 10 was Carmen's own composition, "That's Rock 'n' Roll," a number-one hit in Canada. "She Did It" ranks as the 104th biggest Canadian hit of 1977.

Chicago radio superstation WLS, which gave the song much airplay, ranked "She Did It" as the 56th most popular hit of 1977. It reached as high as number 6 (for two weeks) on their surveys of November 19 and 26, 1977. Other cities where the song was played heavily include Los Angeles, Sacramento, San Jose, Las Vegas, Oklahoma City and Dallas in the west, and Boston, Philadelphia, Richmond, Charlotte, Atlanta and New Orleans in the east, in addition to Ohio, Carmen's home base.

"She Did It" also performed particularly well in Vancouver, where radio station CKLG-AM 1070 ranked "She Did It" as the 27th biggest hit of the year. It peaked at number 3 for two weeks on their surveys of October 19 and 26, 1977.

While not charting nationally in Australia, the song did become a Top 40 hit (#23) in the Sydney area on radio station 2SM.

Chaospin critic Linda Giantino rated it Carmen's 4th greatest solo song, also praising the guitar solo as well as the "incredible depth in the lyrics." Classic Rock History critic Brian Kachejian rated it to be Carmen's 10th greatest solo song.

=== Television performance ===
Carmen performed "She Did It" on The Midnight Special television program (season 6, episode 5) on October 14, 1977. The show was hosted by Marilyn McCoo & Billy Davis Jr.

=== Other appearances ===
"She Did It" was featured on several compilation albums featuring music from 1977 and 1978. It was included on "20 Monster Hits" by EMI, as well as appearing on other similar collections by Ronco and K-Tel. In 1993, it was included on My Crescent Love 2 – Afternoon AOR (BMG Victor). "She Did It" has been included on the following collections of Carmen's material:

- The Best of Eric Carmen (1988)
- Definitive Collection (1997)
- The Essential Eric Carmen (2014)

=== Chart performance ===
Weekly chart (1977–1978)	Peak position
Canada RPM Top Singles	11
France (IFOP)	56
New Zealand (RIANZ)	16
U.S. Billboard Hot 100	23
U.S. Billboard Hot Adult Contemporary Tracks	26
U.S. Cash Box Top 100	15
U.S. Radio & Records	14

Year-end chart (1977)	Rank
Canada	104
U.S. Joel Whitburn's Pop Annual	146

== Michael Damian version ==
"She Did It"

Single by Michael Damian
- B-side: "I Love How You Love Me"
- Released: May 1981
- Genre: Soft rock
- Length: 3:25
- Label: LEG, LLC
- Songwriter: Eric Carmen
- Producers: Pete Moore & Drake Miller

Michael Damian singles chronology
"She Did It" (1981)	"Rock On" (1989)

=== Background and release ===
Almost four years after Eric Carmen's release of "She Did It," the song was covered by actor and singer Michael Damian. This version was Damian's debut single release. It was a non-album single from 1981 that reached number 69 on the Billboard Hot 100 chart and number 95 on the Cash Box Top 100 chart. It was released almost eight years before his subsequent hit, a cover of "Rock On," which reached number one in 1989. "She Did It" was backed with "I Love How You Love Me", a cover of the Paris Sisters.

=== Television performance ===
On April 11, 1981, Damian performed "She Did It" on the ABC-TV Saturday-afternoon program, American Bandstand.

=== Chart performance ===
Chart (1981)	Peak position
U.S. Billboard Hot 100	69
U.S. Cashbox Top 100	95

Year-end chart (1981)	Rank
U.S. Billboard Hot 100	321
