= Hungry Eyes =

1987 single by Eric Carmen

Single by Eric Carmen

from the album Dirty Dancing: Original Soundtrack from the Vestron Motion Picture
- B-side: "Where Are You Tonight"
- Released: October 8, 1987
- Recorded: 1987
- Studio: Beachwood Studios (Beachwood, Ohio)
- Genre: Pop rock; soft rock
- Length: 4:11; 3:49 (single/video edit)
- Label: RCA; Arista
- Songwriter: John DeNicola · Franke Previte
- Producer: Eric Carmen

Eric Carmen singles chronology
"The Rock Stops Here" (1986)	"Hungry Eyes" (1987)	"Make Me Lose Control" (1988)

Music video
- "Hungry Eyes" on YouTube

"Hungry Eyes" is a song performed by American musician Eric Carmen, a former member of the band Raspberries, and was featured in the film Dirty Dancing (1987). The song was recorded at Beachwood Studios in Beachwood, Ohio in 1987. "Hungry Eyes" peaked at No. 4 on the Billboard Hot 100 chart and No. 3 on the Cash Box Top 100 in 1988. The power ballad was not released commercially in the UK, but it managed to peak at No. 82 in January 1988, having charted purely on import sales.

Songwriters Franke Previte and John DeNicola wrote the song, as well as another hit from the Dirty Dancing soundtrack, "(I've Had) The Time of My Life".

== Background ==
Eric Carmen, the lead singer on "Hungry Eyes", had been the vocalist of the Raspberries. In 1975, he released his first solo album Eric Carmen, spawning the worldwide hit "All by Myself", but subsequently faced declining chart fortunes.

"Hungry Eyes" was written in 1984 by John DeNicola and Franke Previte, and originally recorded by Previte's band, Franke and the Knockouts for their album Makin' the Point, but it did not appear on the original version of the album; it was, however, included on a 1998 reissue of the album. Jimmy Ienner, Raspberries' producer, asked Carmen to sing this song for the Dirty Dancing album because he was familiar with Carmen's musical style. Carmen was initially hesitant to produce a song for another film soundtrack because he believed that soundtrack music died "horrible deaths".

The song, Carmen's second Top 40 song of the 1980s, was his biggest hit since "All by Myself". A few months after the success of "Hungry Eyes", Carmen released the Ienner-produced "Make Me Lose Control", which also reached the Top 10 in the US.

== Releases ==
The song was released commercially on 7" vinyl in many countries; plus, a 3-track 12" maxi single and 2-track cassette were produced. CD singles were a relatively new format; however, a 2-track Japanese mini CD single was commercially released in 1988.

=== Track listing ===
7" vinyl single – UK/US
No.	Title	Writer(s)	Length
1.	"Hungry Eyes"	Franke Previte, John DeNicola	3:49
2.	"Where Are You Tonight"	Mark Scola	3:59

12" vinyl single – UK
No.	Title	Writer(s)	Length
1.	"Hungry Eyes"	Franke Previte, John DeNicola	3:49
2.	"Where Are You Tonight"	Mark Scola	3:59
3.	"(I've Had) The Time of My Life (Full Length Film Version)"	Donald Markowitz, Franke Previte, John DeNicola	6:49

Cassette single – US
No.	Title	Writer(s)	Length
1.	"Hungry Eyes" (Song on side A1 and B1)	Franke Previte, John DeNicola	3:49
2.	"Where Are You Tonight" (Song on side A2 and B2)	Mark Scola	3:59

CD single – Japan
No.	Title	Writer(s)	Length
1.	"Hungry Eyes"	Franke Previte, John DeNicola	3:49
2.	"Where Are You Tonight"	Mark Scola	3:59

== Charts ==
=== Weekly charts ===
1988 weekly chart performance for "Hungry Eyes"
Chart (1988)	Peak position
Australia (Australian Music Report)	4
Belgium (Ultratop 50 Flanders)	9
Canada Top Singles (RPM)	2
Canada Adult Contemporary (RPM)	6
Europe (Eurochart Hot 100 Singles)	53
Europe (European Airplay Top 50)	15
Iceland (Íslenski Listinn Topp 10)	6
Italy Airplay (Music & Media)	9
Netherlands (Dutch Top 40)	12
Netherlands (Single Top 100)	16
New Zealand (Recorded Music NZ)	18
South Africa (Springbok Radio)	10
Sweden (Sverigetopplistan)	6
UK Singles (Official Charts)	82
US Billboard Hot 100	4
US Adult Contemporary (Billboard)	2
US Cash Box Top 100 Singles	3
US Contemporary Hit Radio (Radio & Records)	6
US Adult Contemporary (Radio & Records)	1
West Germany (GfK)	17

2019 weekly chart performance for "Hungry Eyes"
Chart (2019)	Peak position
Hungary (Single Top 40)	28

2024 weekly chart performance for "Hungry Eyes"
Chart (2024)	Peak position
Canadian Digital Song Sales (Billboard)	15
UK Singles Downloads (Official Charts)	74
US Digital Song Sales (Billboard)	13

2025 weekly chart performance for "Hungry Eyes"
Chart (2025)	Peak position
Poland (Polish Airplay Top 100)	48

=== Year-end charts ===
Year-end chart performance for "Hungry Eyes"
Chart (1988)	Position
Australia (ARIA)	39
Belgium (Ultratop 50 Flanders)	88
Canada Top Singles (RPM)	49
US Billboard Hot 100	25
US Adult Contemporary (Billboard)	7
US Cash Box Top 100 Singles	30

== Certifications ==
Region	Certification	Certified units/sales
Germany (BVMI)	Gold	250,000^{‡}
Italy (FIMI)	Gold	50,000^{‡}
New Zealand (RMNZ)	3× Platinum	90,000^{‡}
United Kingdom (BPI)	2× Platinum	1,200,000^{‡}
^{‡} Sales+streaming figures based on certification alone.

== Eyeopener version ==
British dance music group Eyeopener covered "Hungry Eyes" and released it as a single on 8 November 2004. Their take reached number 16 in the UK and number 25 in Ireland.

=== Charts ===
Chart (2004)	Peak position
Ireland (IRMA)	25
UK Singles (Official Charts)	16
UK Dance (Official Charts)	15

=== Certifications ===
Region	Certification	Certified units/sales
United Kingdom (BPI)	Silver	200,000^{‡}
^{‡} Sales+streaming figures based on certification alone.

== Other versions ==
New Found Glory released their version on their 2007 album of film covers, From the Screen to Your Stereo Part II.

A reworked rendition with altered lyrics by James Radford appeared in a 2017 commercial for Sheba cat food in the UK.

John Denicola, co-writer of the song, released his own version in 2019 on his debut album The Why Because on Omad Records. It reached number 22 on Billboard's Adult Contemporary chart.

Tobacco covered the song in 2020.
