= Hey Deanie =

1977 hit single performed by Shaun Cassidy

- US single picture sleeve, using image of parent album

Single by Shaun Cassidy

from the album Born Late
- B-side: "Strange Sensation"
- Released: November 1977
- Recorded: 1977
- Genre: Pop
- Length: 3:37
- Label: Warner Bros.
- Songwriter: Eric Carmen
- Producer: Michael Lloyd

Shaun Cassidy singles chronology
"That's Rock 'n' Roll" (1977)	"Hey Deanie" (1977)	"Do You Believe in Magic?" (1978)

Music video
- Listen to "Hey Deanie" on YouTube

"Hey Deanie" is a song written by Eric Carmen. It was a popular hit single by Shaun Cassidy that was released the last week of November, 1977 from his album, Born Late. It was his third and final top-10 hit, peaked at number seven for two weeks on the Billboard Hot 100, spending four months on the chart from late 1977 to early 1978. As with Cassidy's prior singles, this song also became a gold record. Shaun Cassidy has called Hey Deannie his favorite single of all his hit records.

"Hey Deanie" is ranked as the 68th-biggest American hit of 1978. Chicago radio superstation WLS, which gave the song much airplay, ranked "Hey Deanie" as the 45th-most popular hit of 1978. It reached as high as number six on their survey of January 21, 1978.

"Hey Deanie" became an international top-40 hit in both Canada and Australia, reaching number 21 on station 2NUR in Sydney.

== Background ==
"Hey Deanie" was the second hit written by Carmen for Cassidy, the first being "That's Rock 'n' Roll", from Cassidy's previous album. Both songs charted concurrently with Carmen's own hit, "She Did It". Carmen recorded "Hey Deanie" himself for his 1978 album, Change of Heart, and it was also featured as the B side of the title track's 45 RPM release, which became a top-20 hit.

Carmen wrote the song after seeing the film Splendor in the Grass, starring Natalie Wood as "Deanie" and Warren Beatty as her lover. It was the second of two songs inspired by the movie, the other being "Splendor in the Grass", penned and sung in 1966 by Jackie DeShannon.

As with Cassidy's bigger hits, his version of "Hey Deanie" was featured in one of the episodes of The Hardy Boys, as performed by Cassidy's character Joe Hardy. The episode is entitled "Oh Say Can You Sing" (season two, episode 14).

== Chart performance ==
=== Weekly charts ===
Chart (1977–1978)	Peak position
Australia (Kent Music Report)	29
U.S. Billboard Hot 100	7
U.S. Cash Box Top 100	21
Canadian RPM Top Singles	23
Netherlands (Single Top 100)	23

=== Year-end charts ===
Chart (1978)	Rank
U.S. Billboard Hot 100	68
Canada	170

== Cover versions ==
"Hey Deanie" was covered by power pop artist Gary Charlson in 1981, as a live version. It was included on his Real Live album.

== Later uses ==
A portion of the lyrics, "I stand accused, I'm in league with the forces of darkness; an incurable believer in the magic of a midnight sky" was being used for Cassidy's 2020–2023 American concert tour, The Magic of a Midnight Sky.
