= That's Rock 'n' Roll =

1976 single by Eric Carmen

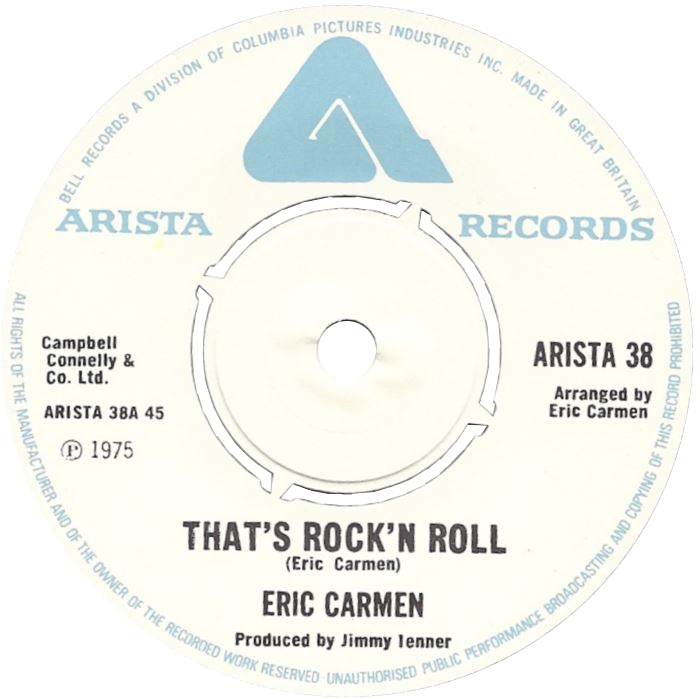
- Side A of the UK single

Single by Eric Carmen

from the album Eric Carmen
- B-side: "Great Expectations"
- Released: May 1976
- Recorded: 1975
- Genre: Power pop
- Label: Arista Records
- Songwriter: Eric Carmen
- Producer: Jimmy Ienner

Eric Carmen singles chronology
| "Never Gonna Fall in Love Again" (1976) | "That's Rock 'n' Roll" (1976) | "Sunrise" (1976) |

"That's Rock 'n' Roll" is a song written and originally recorded by Eric Carmen in 1976. It became a popular Billboard top 10 hit in 1977 for teen idol Shaun Cassidy.

== Eric Carmen version ==
=== Background ===
American pop rock artist Eric Carmen released his version of "That's Rock 'n' Roll" in some nations as the third single from his first eponymous debut album, Eric Carmen. The single's limited release did not include the United States. The song charted at number one in Denmark. Parts of the song are autobiographical.

Carmen performed the song on the Midnight Special TV program on March 26, 1976.

In 1988, "That's Rock 'n' Roll" was featured as the B side of a subsequent major hit by Carmen, "Make Me Lose Control."

Chaospin critic Linda Giantino rated it Carmen's 7th greatest solo song. Classic Rock History critic Brian Kachejian rated it to be Carmen's 8th greatest solo song.

=== Chart performance ===
| Chart (1976) | Peak position |
|---|---|
| Australia | 100 |
| Denmark | 7 |
| France (IFOP) | 72 |
| Japan | |

== Shaun Cassidy version ==
"That's Rock 'n' Roll"
- US single picture sleeve

Single by Shaun Cassidy

from the album Shaun Cassidy
- B-side: "I Wanna Be with You"
- Released: June 1976 (Europe); July 1977 (US)
- Recorded: 1976
- Genre: Pop
- Length: 2:52
- Label: Warner Bros.
- Songwriter: Eric Carmen
- Producer: Michael Lloyd

Shaun Cassidy singles chronology
| "Da Doo Ron Ron" (1977) | "That's Rock 'n' Roll" (1976) | "Hey Deanie" (1977) |

=== Background ===
"That's Rock 'n' Roll" was covered in 1976 by American teen idol Shaun Cassidy on his first solo LP, Shaun Cassidy. It was Cassidy's second of three consecutive Top 10 hits. The following lyrics are omitted from his version:

"Well it's the roadies and the crowd, It's when the band's playin' way too loud, Your hips are shakin', ain't no mistakin'."

"That's Rock 'n' Roll" peaked at number three on the U.S. Billboard Hot 100. It was his longest-charting hit, and spent three weeks longer in the Top 40 than did his number one hit, "Da Doo Ron Ron", with a total of six months on the chart. This song became a gold record, as did all of Cassidy's first three single releases.

"That's Rock and Roll" was the first of two major hits written by Carmen and covered by Cassidy, the second being "Hey Deanie". Both songs charted concurrently with Carmen's own hit, "She Did It" from the fall of 1977.

On the Canadian chart, "That's Rock 'n' Roll" reached number one for one week, displacing the 'Star Wars Theme' to take its turn at number one. It was Cassidy's second Canadian number-one hit. It was also Eric Carmen's second composition to reach the top spot, having reached number one a year earlier with a song he performed himself, "Never Gonna Fall in Love Again."

=== Chart performance ===
==== Weekly charts ====
| Chart (1977) | Peak position |
|---|---|
| Australia (Kent Music Report) | 2 |
| Canadian RPM Top Singles | 1 |
| West Germany | 11 |
| U.S. Billboard Hot 100 | 3 |
| U.S. Cash Box Top 100 | 4 |

==== Year-end charts ====
| Chart (1977) | Rank |
|---|---|
| Australia | 4 |
| Canada | 27 |
| U.S. Billboard Hot 100 | 79 |
| U.S. Cash Box | 43 |

== Certifications and sales ==
| Region | Certification | Certified units/sales |
|---|---|---|
| Australia (ARIA) | Gold | 50,000^{^} |
^{^} Shipments figures based on certification alone.

== Other versions ==
The song has also been covered by:

- The British rock 'n' roll band Showaddywaddy in 1977.
- Tina Arena and John Bowles recorded a version for their album Tiny Tina and Little John.
- A version with slightly modified lyrics was recorded by The Dwarves in 1993.
- Billie Joe Armstrong from Green Day covered the song in 2020 as part of his "No Fun Mondays" series on YouTube.
