= Change of Heart (Eric Carmen album) =

Studio album by Eric Carmen
- Released: September 1978
- Studios: Sound Factory (Hollywood, California)
- Genre: Soft rock
- Length: 29:36
- Label: Arista
- Producer: Eric Carmen

Eric Carmen chronology
Boats Against the Current (1977)	Change of Heart (1978)	Tonight You're Mine (1980)

Professional ratings
Review scores
Source	Rating
Allmusic	2/5 stars

Change of Heart is a 1978 album by Eric Carmen. It was his third solo LP, and reached No. 137 on the Billboard album chart.

The album yielded two charting singles, the title track which was a Top 20 hit in North America, as well as Carmen's remake of the Four Tops' 1964 song, "Baby I Need Your Loving". Both songs were also hits on the American and Canadian adult contemporary charts, reaching the Top 10 in Canada. The single release, "Change of Heart" is ranked as the 135th biggest Canadian hit of 1978, as well as the 160th biggest Canadian hit of 1979.

The LP also contained Carmen's rendition of "Hey Deanie," a Top 10 hit which he wrote for Shaun Cassidy, which was the flip side of the title track 45 RPM.

Samantha Sang, who provides backing vocals on the LP, covered "Change of Heart" that same year, and it was featured as the B side of her second hit single, "You Keep Me Dancing" (US No. 56, Canada AC No. 10).

"Someday," the flip side of Carmen's previous hit, "She Did It," was omitted from Boats Against the Current but was included on this album. "Someday" was also included as the B side of the European release of "Haven't We Come a Long Way," a third single from the LP released in UK and the Netherlands but which failed to chart. The North American release featured "End of the World" as the B side.

The title song also reached number seven in France. It was included on a 2005 album entitled, Nichehits, a compilation of songs by various artists. The album was issued by Victor Records. Chaospin critic Linda Giantino rated the title song as Carmen's 5th greatest solo song, stating that "This beautiful song will take you back to the late 70’s with the great beats and the magnificent back up vocals."

In 2017, Change of Heart was released in Japan for the sixth time.

== Track listing ==
All tracks composed by Eric Carmen; except where indicated.

1. "Desperate Fools Overture" – 2:05
2. "Haven't We Come a Long Way" – 3:17
3. "End of The World" – 3:29
4. "Heaven Can Wait" – 3:33
5. "Baby I Need Your Lovin'" (Holland–Dozier–Holland) – 3:17
6. "Change of Heart" – 3:30
7. "Hey Deanie" – 4:26
8. "Someday" – 2:52
9. "Desperate Fools" – 3:07

== Personnel ==
- Eric Carmen – lead vocals, acoustic piano (3, 5, 8, 9), backing vocals (3), percussion (4, 7, 8), tack piano (7, 8), acoustic guitar (7), drums (7), synthesizers (8)
- Jai Winding – acoustic piano (2, 5, 6), electric harpsichord (2), electric piano (6)
- Craig Doerge – acoustic piano (4)
- David Paich – electric piano (5)
- James Newton Howard – synthesizers (6)
- Burton Cummings – acoustic piano (7)
- Danny Kortchmar – electric guitar (2, 5), guitar solo (3), acoustic guitar (6)
- Richie Zito – acoustic guitar (3), electric guitar (3, 5–7)
- Fred Tackett – acoustic guitar (4)
- Richard Reising – electric guitar (7, 8), backing vocals (7, 8)
- Mike Porcaro – bass (2, 5)
- Dave Wintour – bass (3, 6–8)
- Leland Sklar – bass (4)
- Jeff Porcaro – drums (2, 3, 5)
- Russ Kunkel – drums (4)
- Michael Botts – drums (6)
- Nigel Olsson – drums (7, 8), backing vocals (7, 8)
- Paulinho da Costa – percussion (2, 5)
- Joe Porcaro – percussion (3, 6)
- Tommy Morgan – harmonica (9)
- David Campbell - string arrangements and conductor (1, 4, 9)
- Gene Page – string arrangements and conductor (2, 3, 5)
- Laura Allan – backing vocals (2)
- Valerie Carter – backing vocals (3, 5, 6)
- Donny Gerrard – backing vocals (3, 5, 6)
- Brenda Russell – backing vocals (3, 5, 6)
- Brian Russell – backing vocals (3, 5, 6)
- Samantha Sang – backing vocals (5, 6)
- Curt Boettcher – backing vocals (7, 8)
- Joe Chemay – backing vocals (7, 8)
- Bruce Johnston – backing vocals (7, 8)

== Production ==
- Eric Carmen – producer
- Dennis Kirk – engineer
- Greg Ladanyi – engineer
- Bernie Grundman – mastering
- Donn Davenport – art direction, design
- Garry Gross – photography
- Recorded at The Sound Factory (Hollywood, California).
- Mastered at A&M Studios (Hollywood, California).

== Charts ==
=== Weekly charts ===
Chart (1978)	Peak position
Australian Albums (Kent Music Report)	93
US Billboard 200	137
