= It Hurts Too Much =

- Side A of the US single

Single by Eric Carmen

from the album Tonight You're Mine
- B-side: "You Need Some Lovin'"
- Released: July 1980
- Genre: Pop
- Length: 4:09 (album); 3:53 (single)
- Label: Arista Records
- Songwriter: Eric Carmen
- Producer: Harry Maslin

Eric Carmen singles chronology
"Baby I Need Your Lovin'" (1979)	"It Hurts Too Much" (1980)	"All for Love" (1980)

"It Hurts Too Much" is a 1980 song by Eric Carmen. It was the lead single from his fourth album, Tonight You're Mine, and was the more successful of two releases from the LP.

The song reached number 75 on the U.S. Billboard Hot 100 and number 71 on Record World. It was also a big regional hit in Perth, Australia. "It Hurts Too Much" did best in South Africa, where it reached number three and became Carmen's biggest hit in that nation.

== Later uses ==
"It Hurts Too Much" was featured on the soundtrack of the 2010 comedy movie, Super.

== Chart history ==
Chart (1980)	Peak position
France (IFOP)	9
South Africa (Springbok Radio)	3
US Billboard Hot 100	75
US Cash Box	83
US Record World	71

== Cover versions ==
The Shivvers covered the song on their LP, Lost Hits From Milwaukee's First Family Of Powerpop 1979-82.
