= Dirty Dancing (soundtrack) =

Dirty Dancing: Original Soundtrack from the Vestron Motion Picture
- Standard artwork

Soundtrack album by various artists
- Released: August 4, 1987
- Recorded: 1986–1987
- Genres: Pop rock; R&B; soft rock
- Length: 39:25
- Label: RCA Victor

Dirty Dancing chronology
| Dirty Dancing: Original Soundtrack from the Vestron Motion Picture (1987) | More Dirty Dancing (1988) |

Singles from Dirty Dancing: Original Soundtrack from the Vestron Motion Picture
- 1. "(I've Had) The Time of My Life" Released: July 10, 1987; 2. "Hungry Eyes" Released: October 1987 (US); 3. "She's Like the Wind" Released: December 1987 (US); 4. "Yes" Released: February 1988

Professional ratings
Review scores
| Source | Rating |
|---|---|
| AllMusic | 4/5 stars |

Dirty Dancing: Original Soundtrack from the Vestron Motion Picture is the original soundtrack to the 1987 film Dirty Dancing. It was released on August 4, 1987, by RCA Records. Sales estimates vary; Guinness World Records reported in 2012 that the album had sold approximately 42 million copies worldwide. In the United States, the album spent 18 weeks at number one on the Billboard 200 chart and has been certified 14-times Platinum by the Recording Industry Association of America (RIAA). With shipments of at least 3.25 million copies, it is the all-time best-selling album in Germany.

A follow-up album, More Dirty Dancing, was released in March 1988. The album Ultimate Dirty Dancing, released in December 2003, contains every song from the motion picture Dirty Dancing in the order it appears in the film.

Due to the strong resurgence of vinyl record sales, for the film's 30th anniversary in 2017, Dirty Dancing received a vinyl reissue, along with a Blu-ray remaster with a 5.1 surround soundtrack and previously unreleased material.

== Track listing ==
=== 1987 original edition ===
1. "(I've Had) The Time of My Life" (Bill Medley, Jennifer Warnes) – 4:50
2. "Be My Baby" (The Ronettes) – 2:37
3. "She's Like the Wind" (Patrick Swayze) – 3:53
4. "Hungry Eyes" (Eric Carmen) – 4:06
5. "Stay" (Maurice Williams and the Zodiacs) – 1:34
6. "Yes" (Merry Clayton) – 3:15
7. "You Don't Own Me" (The Blow Monkeys) – 2:59
8. "Hey! Baby" (Bruce Channel) – 2:21
9. "Overload" (Alfie Zappacosta) – 3:39
10. "Love Is Strange" (Mickey & Sylvia) – 2:52
11. "Where Are You Tonight?" (Tom Johnston) – 3:59
12. "In the Still of the Night" (The Five Satins) – 3:03

=== 20th Anniversary Edition ===
On October 15, 2007, RCA Records released a 20th anniversary edition of the soundtrack, containing remastered versions of the original album's songs (in order of which they appeared in movie) plus additional tracks, as well as a DVD featuring promotional videos and photo material.

Disc one (CD)

1. "Be My Baby" (The Ronettes)
2. "Big Girls Don't Cry" (The Four Seasons)
3. "Merengue" (Michael Lloyd & Le Disc)
4. "Trot the Fox" (Michael Lloyd & Le Disc)
5. "Johnny's Mambo" (Michael Lloyd & Le Disc)
6. "(I've Had) Time of My Life" [Instrumental Version] (The John Morris Orchestra)
7. "Where Are You Tonight?" (Tom Johnston)
8. "Do You Love Me" (The Contours)
9. "Love Man" (Otis Redding)
10. "Gazebo Waltz" (Michael Lloyd)
11. "Stay" (Maurice Williams and the Zodiacs)
12. "Wipe Out" (The Surfaris)
13. "Hungry Eyes" (Eric Carmen)
14. "Overload" (Zappacosta)
15. "Hey! Baby" (Bruce Channel)
16. "De Todo Un Poco" (Michael Lloyd & Le Disc)
17. "Some Kind of Wonderful" (The Drifters)
18. "These Arms of Mine" (Otis Redding)
19. "Cry to Me" (Solomon Burke)
20. "Will You Love Me Tomorrow" (The Shirelles)
21. "Love Is Strange" (Mickey & Sylvia)
22. "You Don't Own Me" (The Blow Monkeys)
23. "Yes" (Merry Clayton)
24. "In the Still of the Night" (The Five Satins)
25. "She's Like the Wind" (Patrick Swayze)
26. "Kellerman's Anthem" (The Emile Bergstein Chorale)
27. "(I've Had) The Time of My Life" (Bill Medley & Jennifer Warnes)

Disc two (DVD)

1. "She's Like the Wind" video
2. "Yes" video
3. "Hungry Eyes" video
4. "Do You Love Me" video
5. "(I've Had) The Time of My Life" video
6. "(I've Had) The Time of My Life" karaoke version
7. Photo gallery

== Charts ==
=== Weekly charts ===
| Chart (1987–1988) | Peak position |
|---|---|
| Australian Albums (Australian Music Report) | 1 |
| Austrian Albums (Ö3 Austria) | 1 |
| Canada Top Albums/CDs (RPM) | 2 |
| Dutch Albums (Album Top 100) | 1 |
| European Albums (Music & Media) | 1 |
| Finnish Albums (Suomen virallinen lista) | 34 |
| German Albums (Offizielle Top 100) | 1 |
| New Zealand Albums (RMNZ) | 1 |
| Norwegian Albums (VG-lista) | 6 |
| Portuguese Albums (AFP) | 48 |
| Spanish Albums (AFYVE) | 2 |
| Swedish Albums (Sverigetopplistan) | 4 |
| Swiss Albums (Schweizer Hitparade) | 1 |
| UK Albums (Official Charts) | 4 |
| US Billboard 200 | 1 |

| Chart (2002) | Peak position |
|---|---|
| UK Soundtrack Albums (Official Charts) | 2 |

| Chart (2011) | Peak position |
|---|---|
| French Albums (SNEP) | 102 |

| Chart (2016) | Peak position |
|---|---|
| US Soundtrack Albums (Billboard) | 5 |

| Chart (2019–2025) | Peak position |
|---|---|
| Belgian Albums (Ultratop Flanders) | 123 |
| Belgian Albums (Ultratop Wallonia) | 98 |
| Hungarian Physical Albums (MAHASZ) | 28 |
| Polish Albums (ZPAV) | 44 |

=== Year-end chart ===
| Chart (1988) | Position |
|---|---|
| Australian Albums (ARIA) | 2 |
| Austrian Albums (Ö3 Austria) | 1 |
| Canada Top Albums/CDs (RPM) | 3 |
| Dutch Albums (Album Top 100) | 10 |
| European Albums (Music & Media) | 2 |
| German Albums (Offizielle Top 100) | 1 |
| New Zealand Albums (RMNZ) | 3 |
| Swiss Albums (Schweizer Hitparade) | 1 |
| UK Albums (OCC) | 14 |
| US Billboard 200 | 2 |

| Chart (2016) | Position |
|---|---|
| US Soundtrack Albums (Billboard) | 11 |

== Certifications and sales ==
| Region | Certification | Certified units/sales |
|---|---|---|
| Australia (ARIA) | 11× Platinum | 790,000 |
| Austria | — | 100,000 |
| Brazil (Pro-Música Brasil) | Gold | 100,000^{*} |
| Canada (Music Canada) | Diamond | 1,000,000^{^} |
| Denmark (IFPI Danmark) | 3× Platinum | 60,000^{‡} |
| France (SNEP) | Diamond | 1,200,000 |
| Germany (BVMI) | 13× Gold | 3,250,000^{‡} |
| Hong Kong (IFPI Hong Kong) | Gold | 10,000^{*} |
| Italy (FIMI) | Gold | 100,000 |
| Italy (FIMI) sales since 2009 | Gold | 25,000^{‡} |
| Netherlands (NVPI) | Platinum | 100,000^{^} |
| New Zealand (RMNZ) | Platinum | 15,000^{^} |
| Poland (ZPAV) | Gold | 50,000^{*} |
| South Africa (RISA) | 3× Platinum | 150,000^{*} |
| Spain (Promusicae) | 4× Platinum | 400,000^{^} |
| Sweden (GLF) | Platinum | 100,000^{^} |
| Switzerland (IFPI Switzerland) | 5× Platinum | 250,000^{^} |
| United Kingdom (BPI) | 10× Platinum | 3,150,000 |
| United States (RIAA) | 14× Platinum | 14,000,000^{‡} |
Summaries
| Worldwide | — | 42,000,000 |
^{*} Sales figures based on certification alone.^{^} Shipments figures based on certification alone.^{‡} Sales+streaming figures based on certification alone.

== See also ==
- List of best-selling albums
- List of best-selling albums in Australia
- List of best-selling albums in France
- List of best-selling albums in Germany
- List of best-selling albums in the United Kingdom
- List of best-selling albums in the United States
- List of diamond-certified albums in Canada
