= Boats Against the Current =

Studio album by Eric Carmen
- Released: August 1977
- Studio: Crystal Sound (Los Angeles); Studio 55 (Los Angeles); Sound Factory (Hollywood); Brother (Santa Monica)
- Genre: Soft rock
- Length: 37:57
- Label: Arista
- Producer: Eric Carmen

Eric Carmen chronology
Eric Carmen (1975)	Boats Against the Current (1977)	Change of Heart (1978)

Singles from Boats Against The Current
- 1. "She Did It" Released: August 1977; 2. "Boats Against the Current" Released: 1977

Boats Against the Current is a 1977 album by Eric Carmen. The title is taken from a line in the novel The Great Gatsby by F. Scott Fitzgerald, “So we beat on, boats against the current, borne back ceaselessly into the past.” It was Carmen's second solo LP, after the Raspberries disbanded. It peaked at No. 45 on the Billboard 200 for the week ending October 8, 1977.

The album yielded two charting singles, the title track as well as "She Did It." "She Did It" is the bigger hit from this album, which reached No. 23 Billboard and No. 15 Cash Box, as well as No. 11 in Canada. The title track subsequently reached No. 88 Billboard and No. 92 Cash Box. "Marathon Man" was released as a third single in March 1978 but failed to chart. The "Love Is All That Matters" melody is lifted from Tchaikovsky's "Fifth Symphony, Second Movement."

Guest musicians on this album included back-up vocals by Brian Wilson and Bruce Johnston of the Beach Boys and Burton Cummings (formerly of the Guess Who), guitar by Andrew Gold, and drumming by Nigel Olsson and Toto's Jeff Porcaro.

The title song was covered by Frankie Valli on his 1977 LP Lady Put the Light Out. "Boats Against the Current" was also covered in 1978 by Olivia Newton-John on her album Totally Hot, and it was included as the B-side of her single release, "Rest Your Love on Me." Patti LaBelle also included the song on her 1981 LP, The Spirit's in It.

As reported by Casey Kasem on the American Top 40 program of October 15, 1977, Boats Against the Current cost $375,000 to produce, six times the average cost for an album of that era. The LP had a series of false starts. Across six months starting in February 1977, three sessions with Elton John's producer Gus Dudgeon were undertaken using recording studios in London, Cleveland, and Los Angeles, but were all scrapped. Carmen then took over the production efforts himself before the tracks were complete and he was satisfied.

== Live performances ==
Carmen performed three tracks from the LP ("She Did It," "Boats Against the Current" and "Marathon Man") on The Midnight Special television program (season 6, episode 5) on October 14, 1977. The show was hosted by Marilyn McCoo & Billy Davis Jr.

== Critical reception ==
Professional ratings
Review scores
Source	Rating
AllMusic	2/5 stars

Reviewing a reissue, Goldmine wrote that "the title track is at once lyrically depressing and musically uplifting, while 'Love Is All That Matters' and 'Nowhere to Hide' are both under-rated, piano-dominated gems."

The title track was released as a single and reached #88 on the Billboard Hot 100. Billboard recommended the song. AllMusic critic Michael Ofjord praised the song and said that it's "an adult song about love lost and the illusions that people cling to (though Carmen has said it is actually inspired by the breakup with producer Jimmy Ienner)." Classic Rock History critic Brian Kachejian rated the title track to be Carmen's greatest solo song, stating that "It is one of the most heartbreaking breakup songs ever written. It’s genuine, sad, and an amazing work of art."

== Track listing ==
All tracks composed by Eric Carmen:

1. "Boats Against the Current" – 4:22
2. "Marathon Man" – 3:55
3. "Nowhere to Hide" – 5:05
4. "Take It or Leave It" – 4:00
5. "Love Is All That Matters" – 4:17
6. "She Did It" – 3:48
7. "I Think I Found Myself" – 4:25
8. "Run Away" – 8:05

== Personnel ==
- Eric Carmen – lead vocals, acoustic piano, synthesizers (1, 2, 5–7), electric guitar (1, 4), string arrangements and conductor (1, 5), electric harpsichord (2, 3), drums (2), 12-string acoustic guitar (4), percussion (4–7), backing vocals (5–7), BGV arrangements (6)
- Michael Boddicker – synthesizers (2, 3, 5, 7, 8)
- Richard Reising – acoustic guitar (2, 5), acoustic piano (4), electric guitar (4, 6, 8), guitar solo (4), backing vocals (4–7)
- Richie Zito – acoustic guitar (2, 4, 5), electric guitar (4, 6, 8), backing vocals (4)
- Andrew Gold – electric guitar solo (6), electric guitar (8)
- Dave Wintour – bass
- Jeff Porcaro – drums (1, 5, 6)
- Nigel Olsson – drums (2–4, 7, 8), backing vocals (5–7)
- Gene Estes – percussion (1–3, 8)
- Ollie E. Brown – percussion (6, 8)
- Jim Horn – saxophone (4)
- Bobby Keys – saxophone (4)
- Tom Scott – saxophone (4, 7)
- Steve Madaio – trumpet (4)
- Paul Buckmaster – string arrangements and conductor (2, 3, 6, 8)
- Burton Cummings – backing vocals (2)
- Curt Becher – backing vocals (5–7)
- Joe Chemay – backing vocals (5–7)
- Bruce Johnston – backing vocals (5–7), BGV arrangements (5–7)
- Brian Wilson – backing vocals (5–7)

=== Production ===
- Eric Carmen – producer, arrangements
- Kevin Beamish – engineer
- Larry Emerine – engineer
- David Henson – engineer
- Mark Howlett – engineer
- Dennis Kirk – engineer
- Tim Kramer – engineer
- Earle Mankey – engineer
- Howard Steele – engineer
- Thom Wilson – engineer
- Val Garay – mixing
- Doug Sax – mastering
- Bob Heimall – art direction
- Ed Caraeff – design, photography
- Benno Friedman – inside photography effects
- Norman Adams – inside artwork
- Michael Manoogian – calligraphy

Studios

- Recorded at Crystal Sound and Studio 55 (Los Angeles, California); The Sound Factory (Hollywood, California); Brother Studios (Santa Monica, California).
- Mixed at The Sound Factory
- Mastered at The Mastering Lab (Hollywood, California).

== Charts ==
=== Weekly charts ===
Chart (1977/78)	Peak position
Australian Albums (Kent Music Report)	37
Swedish Albums (Sverigetopplistan)	39
US Billboard 200	45

== Certifications ==
Certifications for Boats Against the Current
Region	Certification	Certified units/sales
Canada (Music Canada)	Gold	50,000^{^}
^{^} Shipments figures based on certification alone.
