= Never Gonna Fall in Love Again =

1976 single by Eric Carmen

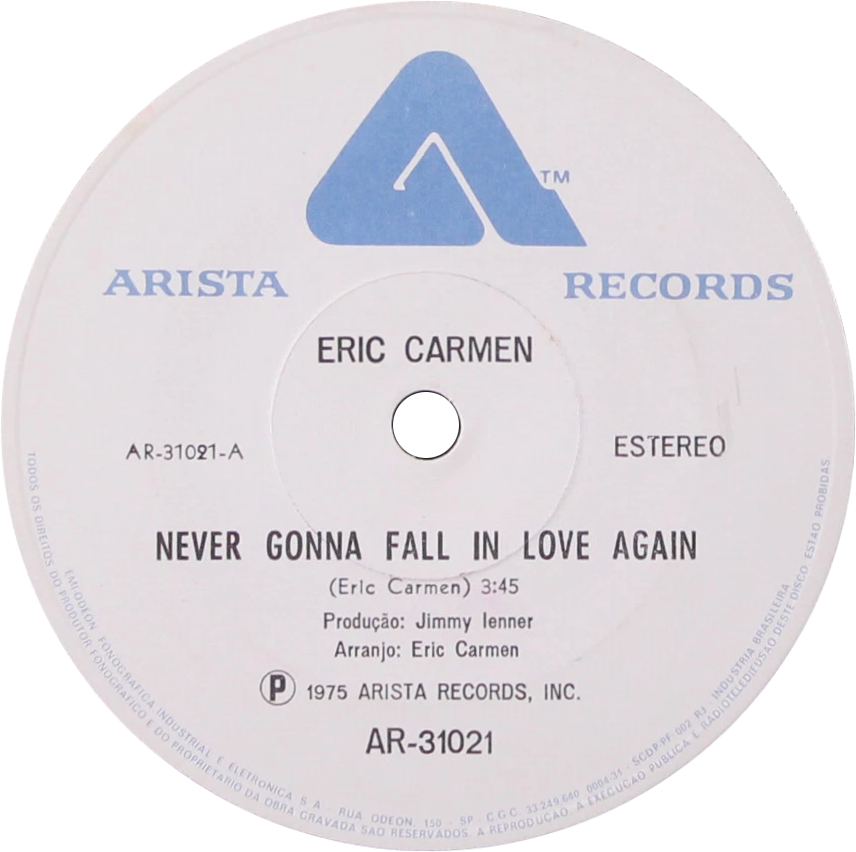
- Side A of the Brazilian single

Single by Eric Carmen

from the album Eric Carmen
- B-side: "No Hard Feelings"
- Released: April 1976
- Recorded: 1975
- Genre: Soft rock
- Length: 3:45 (Album Version); 2:48 (Single Version)
- Label: Arista 0184
- Songwriters: Eric Carmen, Sergei Rachmaninoff
- Producer: Jimmy Ienner

Eric Carmen singles chronology
"All by Myself" (1975)	"Never Gonna Fall in Love Again" (1976)	"That's Rock 'n' Roll" (1976)

Audio video
- "Never Gonna Fall in Love Again" on YouTube

"Never Gonna Fall in Love Again" is a song co-written and recorded by American pop rock artist Eric Carmen. It was released as the second single from Carmen's self-titled debut solo album and peaked at No.11 on the US Billboard Hot 100 chart in June 1976, remaining in the Top 40 for ten weeks. The song reached No.1 on the Billboard Easy Listening chart. In Canada, it was a hit at No. 1 on both charts.

The melody of "Never Gonna Fall in Love Again" is based on the third movement (Adagio) from Symphony No. 2 by Russian composer Sergei Rachmaninoff.

Billboard described the song as a "ballad with characteristically good Carmen lyrics and vocals and lush orchestration." Cash Box said that it "has a hook-filled melody and chorus" and that "the tune will doubtless be covered by many artists, but the others will have to work hard to measure up to Carmen's version of his own song." Record World called it a "lush offering driven by an emotive performance."

Classic Rock History critic Brian Kachejian rated it to be Carmen's 2nd greatest solo song, stating that "the melody and the groove were one for the ages."

On his second solo LP, Boats Against the Current, Carmen had a subsequent Top 40 hit entitled "She Did It", a happy answer to the loneliness and lovelessness described in this song and its equally melancholy predecessor, "All By Myself".

== Television performance ==
Carmen performed "Never Gonna Fall in Love Again" and his prior hit, "All By Myself" on The Midnight Special television program on July 23, 1976 (season 4, episode 37). The show was hosted by The Spinners.

== Charts ==
=== Weekly charts ===
Chart (1976)	Peak position
Canadian RPM Top Singles	1
Canadian Adult Contemporary	1
New Zealand (RIANZ)	30
US Billboard Hot 100	11
US Billboard Adult Contemporary	1
US Cash Box Top 100	9

=== Year-end charts ===
Chart (1976)	Rank
Canada RPM Top Singles	26
US Billboard Adult Contemporary	24
US (Joel Whitburn's Pop Annual)	95

== Notable cover versions ==
Australian singer-songwriter Mark Holden's 1975 debut studio album Dawn in Darkness, which consisted entirely of original songs, was a commercial failure, selling only approximately 2,000 copies. In April 1976, Holden received a call from Colin Petersen, EMI Music Australia's A&R, who suggested he cover "Never Gonna Fall in Love Again". In his 2017 autobiography, Holden said recording it "was a chance for me to have a hit". He promoted the song by performing it on the Australian music television program Countdown while handing out red carnations to the audience. It became an infamous performance which led to Holden's nickname of "The Carnation Kid" His version, released in April 1976 as his debut single, peaked at No.13 on the Kent Music Report, becoming a commercial success. It was the 71st-biggest selling single in Australia in 1976.

Unlike "All by Myself," Carmen's version of "Never Gonna Fall in Love Again" was not released in Australia and therefore did not chart. Also in 1976, Dana reached No.31 in the UK with her cover of the song. Her British release charted concurrently with the versions by Carmen and Holden.

== See also ==
- List of number-one adult contemporary singles of 1976 (U.S.)
- List of number-one singles of 1976 (Canada)
