= Eric Carmen =

American singer and musician (1949–2024)

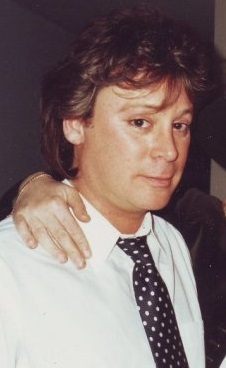
- Carmen, c. 1991

Background information
- Born: Eric Howard Carmen; August 11, 1949; Cleveland, Ohio, U.S.
- Origin: Lyndhurst, Ohio, U.S.
- Died: March 10, 2024 (aged 74) Paradise Valley, Arizona, U.S.
- Genres: Pop rock; power pop; soft rock
- Occupations: Singer; songwriter; musician
- Instruments: Vocals; piano; keyboards; guitar; bass guitar; drums; percussion
- Years active: 1967–2024
- Labels: Arista; Geffen
- Formerly of: Raspberries; Ringo Starr & His All-Starr Band
- Spouse(s): Marcy Hill (m. 1978; div. 1979) Susan Brown (m. 1993; div. 2009) Amy Murphy (m. 2016)
- Website: ericcarmen.com

Eric Howard Carmen (August 11, 1949 – March 10, 2024) was an American singer-songwriter and multi-instrumentalist. He was the lead vocalist of the Raspberries, with whom he recorded the hit "Go All the Way" and four albums. He embarked on a solo career in 1975 and had global success with "All by Myself," "Never Gonna Fall in Love Again," "She Did It," "Hungry Eyes," and "Make Me Lose Control." In later years, he toured with Ringo Starr & His All-Starr Band before reforming the Raspberries in 2004.

== Early life ==
From a family of Russian Jewish immigrants, Carmen was born on August 11, 1949, in Cleveland, Ohio and grew up in Lyndhurst. He was involved with music from early childhood. By the age of two, he was entertaining his parents with his impressions of Jimmy Durante and Johnnie Ray. At three, he was in the Dalcroze eurhythmics program at the Cleveland Institute of Music. When he was six, he took violin lessons from his aunt Muriel Carmen, who was a violinist in the Cleveland Orchestra. At 11, he was playing piano and dreaming about writing his own songs. The arrival of the Beatles and the Rolling Stones altered his dream slightly. By the time he was a sophomore at Charles F. Brush High School in Lyndhurst, Carmen was playing piano and singing in rock bands including the Sounds of Silence.

Though classically trained in piano, at age 15, Carmen began taking guitar lessons, but when his teacher's approach did not fit with what he wanted, he decided to teach himself. He bought a Beatles chord book and studied guitar for the next four months.

== Work with the Raspberries ==
Carmen became serious about being a musician while attending John Carroll University in University Heights, Ohio. He joined a band named Cyrus Erie, which recorded several commercially unsuccessful singles for Epic Records. Cyrus Erie guitarist Wally Bryson had been playing with friends Jim Bonfanti and Dave Smalley in one of Cleveland's most popular bands, the Choir, which scored a minor national hit in 1967 with the single "It's Cold Outside."

When Cyrus Erie and the Choir disbanded at the end of the 1960s, Carmen, Bryson, Bonfanti, and Smalley teamed to form the Raspberries, a rock and roll band which was among the chief exponents of the early-1970s power pop style. Carmen was the lead singer of the group and wrote or co-wrote all their hit songs. In 1975, after the breakup of the Raspberries, he started his solo career, de-emphasizing harder rock elements in favor of soft rock and power ballads.

In 2004, Carmen, along with original Raspberries members Bonfanti, Bryson, and Smalley reformed the band for a series of sold-out live performances in cities across the United States. On the tour the Raspberries recorded a live album of their hits at the House of Blues on Sunset Strip in West Hollywood, California. Both the show and album received critical acclaim.

== Solo career ==
Carmen's first two solo singles were chart hits in 1976. Both were built around themes by Sergei Rachmaninoff. The first single, "All by Myself"—based on Rachmaninoff's Piano Concerto No. 2—was No. 2 in the United States and No. 12 in the United Kingdom, where it was his only song to chart. It sold over one million copies, and was awarded a gold disc by the RIAA in April 1976. The follow-up single, "Never Gonna Fall in Love Again"—based on the main theme of the third movement of Rachmaninoff's Symphony No. 2—reached No. 11 on the Billboard Hot 100 and hit No. 1 on the US Adult Contemporary Chart, as well as number 9 on the Cash Box chart. In the UK, Dana took it to No. 31 and in Australia, Mark Holden took it to No. 13. Those two songs featured on his 1975 self-titled debut album along with "That's Rock and Roll," a No. 3 hit single for singer Shaun Cassidy. The album made No. 21 on the Billboard album chart and was certified gold in 1977 for sales of more than 500,000 copies.

Carmen's second album, Boats Against the Current, was released in the summer of 1977 to mixed reviews. It featured backup players including Burton Cummings, Andrew Gold, Bruce Johnston, and Nigel Olsson. The album spent 13 weeks on the Billboard album chart, peaking at number 45. It also produced the top-20 single "She Did It," but the title track only managed to find the bottom of the chart. The title track was later covered by Olivia Newton-John on her album Totally Hot. A third single taken from the album, "Marathon Man," became his first solo single not to hit the Billboard Hot 100 chart. However, Shaun Cassidy again made the top 10 in 1978 with Carmen's "Hey Deanie." For several weeks in the fall of 1977, Carmen had three compositions charting concurrently on the Billboard Hot 100; Cassidy's two big hits and Carmen's own "She Did It."

Carmen followed with two more albums. Despite declining chart fortunes, the single "Change of Heart" broke into the top 20, and reached number six on the AC chart in late 1978, with the hit also being covered by Samantha Sang on her Emotion LP. In 1980, he released the album Tonight You're Mine with its lead single "It Hurts Too Much" (number 75 Billboard Hot 100).

In 1984, Carmen and Dean Pitchford co-wrote "Almost Paradise," the love theme from the film Footloose. Performed by Ann Wilson and Mike Reno, the song peaked at number seven on the Billboard Hot 100. In 1985, Carmen resurfaced on Geffen Records with a second self-titled album and a sizable comeback hit, "I Wanna Hear It from Your Lips." The single hit the Adult Contemporary top 10 and the Pop top 40. The follow-up single, "I'm Through with Love," also climbed the Billboard Hot 100 and was in the top 20 of the Adult Contemporary chart. Another track from the album, "Maybe My Baby," later became a country hit for Louise Mandrell, reaching number eight on Billboard's Hot Country Songs chart. "I Wanna Hear It from Your Lips" was also covered by Mandrell, but only reached No. 35 on the same chart.

In 1987, Carmen's contribution to the hit film Dirty Dancing, "Hungry Eyes," reached number two on the Adult Contemporary chart and also returned him to the Pop top 10. "Reason to Try," a further contribution to the One Moment in Time compilation album of songs recorded for the 1988 Seoul Summer Olympics, kept Carmen's profile high in 1988. Also in 1988, the nostalgic "Make Me Lose Control" reached the number one position on the Adult Contemporary chart (where it stayed for three straight weeks) and reached number three on the Billboard Hot 100.

The album I Was Born to Love You was recorded in 1997 at Beachwood Studios (the same very studio he recorded "Hungry Eyes") by the production team of Lee Mars and Howard Perl. The album was released in 1998 in Japan as Winter Dreams. Carmen eschewed the use of a band on the recording, playing most of the instruments and programming the drum parts himself. The album did not find a large audience, but Carmen continued to enjoy success placing songs with other artists over the years. In 2000, he toured with Ringo Starr & His All-Starr Band. On December 24, 2013, the first new recording in over 15 years by Carmen titled "Brand New Year" was released. The track, written and recorded in November and December 2013 in Ohio and Los Angeles, was issued as a free download by Legacy Recordings as a special "Christmas gift," to herald the March 2014 arrival of a 30-track career retrospective entitled The Essential Eric Carmen.

== Personal life ==
Carmen was married three times: to Marcy Hill from 1978 to 1979; to Susan Brown, with whom he had two children, from 1993 to 2009; and to former newscaster Amy Murphy from 2016 until his death in 2024. Carmen moved from Los Angeles to Gates Mills, Ohio in the 1990s. He was a supporter of President Donald Trump.

After Carmen's death, his children Clayton and Kathryn filed a lawsuit against their stepmother, Amy Carmen, in Cuyahoga County Probate Court, accusing her of wrongly disinheriting them from a trust their father had established in 2007. After Amy Carmen's attorneys filed to have the case moved to federal court, they filed responses to the claims.

On April 2, 2026, a federal judge dismissed the lawsuit brought by Eric Carmen's adult children against their stepmother, Amy Carmen. The court found that a 2020 settlement—under which each adult child (and their mother) received a lump-sum payment and signed a broad general release of claims against both their father and stepmother—bars them from inheriting from or asserting any claims against their father's estate.

== Death and legacy ==
On March 10, 2024, Carmen's wife Amy announced that he had died in his sleep over the previous weekend at the age of 74. No cause or location of death was given at the time. Legal documents filed later that month showed Carmen died on March 10 in Paradise Valley, Arizona. His widow Amy filed further lawsuits against all public authorities to block the release of autopsy results.

The city of Cleveland, in collaboration with the Rock and Roll Hall of Fame, declared August 11, Carmen's birthday, "Eric Carmen Day" in his honor, also posthumously awarding him with the "Music Keynote to the City."

== Discography ==
=== Solo ===
==== Studio albums ====
| Title | Album details | Peak chart positions | | | | Certifications |
| Title | Album details | US | AUS | SWE | UK | Certifications |
|---|---|---|---|---|---|---|
| Eric Carmen | Released: November 1975; Label: Arista Records | 21 | 15 | 41 | 58 | RIAA: Gold |
| Boats Against the Current | Released: August 1977; Label: Arista | 45 | 37 | 39 | – | |
| Change of Heart | Released: September 1978; Label: Arista | 137 | 93 | – | – | |
| Tonight You're Mine | Released: January 1, 1980; Label: Arista | 160 | 80 | – | – | |
| Eric Carmen | Released: January 7, 1985; Label: Geffen Records | 128 | – | – | – | |
| I Was Born to Love You (released as Winter Dreams in Japan) | Released: 1998; Label: Pioneer | – | – | – | – | |

==== Compilation albums ====
| Title | Album details | Peak chart positions | | | Certifications |
| Title | Album details | US | AUS | NZ | Certifications |
|---|---|---|---|---|---|
| The Best of Eric Carmen | Released: June 1988; Label: Arista | 59 | 17 | 26 | |
| The Definitive Collection | Released: June 17, 1997; Label: Arista | – | – | – | |
| All by Myself – The Best of Eric Carmen | Released: October 21, 1999; Label: Collectables | – | – | – | |
| The Essential Eric Carmen | Released: March 25, 2014; Label: Arista | – | – | – | |

==== Charted singles ====
| Title | Year | Peak chart positions | | | | | | | | | Certifications | Album |
| Title | Year | US | US AC | AUS | CAN | GER | NL | NZ | SWE | UK | Certifications | Album |
|---|---|---|---|---|---|---|---|---|---|---|---|---|
| "All by Myself" | 1975 | 2 | 6 | 7 | 3 | – | 7 | 6 | – | 12 | RIAA: Gold | Eric Carmen |
| "Never Gonna Fall in Love Again" | 1976 | 11 | 1 | – | 1 | – | – | 30 | – | – | | Eric Carmen |
| "That's Rock 'n' Roll" | 1976 | – | – | 100 | – | – | – | – | – | – | | Eric Carmen |
| "Sunrise" | 1976 | 34 | 33 | – | 33 | – | – | – | – | – | | Eric Carmen |
| "She Did It" | 1977 | 23 | 26 | 30 | 11 | – | – | 16 | – | – | | Boats Against the Current |
| "Boats Against the Current" | 1977 | 88 | – | – | – | – | – | – | – | – | | Boats Against the Current |
| "Change of Heart" | 1978 | 19 | 6 | – | 14 | – | – | – | – | – | | Change of Heart |
| "Baby I Need Your Lovin'" | 1978 | 62 | 30 | – | 50 | – | – | – | – | – | | Change of Heart |
| "It Hurts Too Much" | 1980 | 75 | – | 45 | – | – | – | – | – | – | | Tonight You're Mine |
| "I Wanna Hear It from Your Lips" | 1985 | 35 | 10 | 27 | 17 (AC) | – | – | – | – | – | | Eric Carmen |
| "I'm Through with Love" | 1985 | 87 | 16 | – | – | – | – | – | – | – | | Eric Carmen |
| "Hungry Eyes" | 1987 | 4 | 2 | 4 | 2 | 17 | 16 | 18 | 6 | 82 | BPI: Platinum; BVMI: Gold | Dirty Dancing: Original Soundtrack |
| "As Long as We Got Each Other" (with Louise Mandrell) | 1988 | – (Note: "As Long as We Got Each Other" peaked at number 51 on Billboard's Hot Country Songs chart.) | – | – | – | – | – | – | – | – | | Best of Louise Mandrell |
| "Make Me Lose Control" | 1988 | 3 | 1 | 8 | 2 | – | – | 29 | – | 93 | | The Best of Eric Carmen |
| "Reason to Try" | 1988 | 87 | – | 133 | – | – | – | – | – | – | | 1988 Summer Olympics Album: One Moment in Time |
