= Eric Carmen (1975 album) =

Studio album by Eric Carmen
- Released: November 1975
- Recorded: August – September 1975
- Studios: O.D.O. Sound, New York City
- Genre: Soft rock
- Length: 39:36
- Label: Arista
- Producer: Jimmy Ienner

Eric Carmen chronology
Eric Carmen (1975)	Boats Against the Current (1977)

Singles from Eric Carmen
- 1. "All by Myself" Released: December 1975; 2. "Never Gonna Fall in Love Again" Released: April 1976; 3. "That's Rock and Roll" Released: May 1976 (non US single); 4. "Sunrise" Released: August 1976

Professional ratings
Review scores
Source	Rating
AllMusic	3/5 stars
The Village Voice	C+

Eric Carmen is the debut album by American rock musician and singer-songwriter Eric Carmen. It is also his first of two self-titled albums, the other released in 1984. It peaked at No. 21 on the Billboard album chart upon its release in 1975, the highest position of his career, and generated the No. 2 pop single "All by Myself" in the same year. The song reached No. 1 on the Cashbox and Record World charts. The album also included two follow-up top 40 hits, "Never Gonna Fall in Love Again" (No. 11), and "Sunrise" (No. 34), both of which charted in 1976.

All tracks were written by Carmen except the Drifters' song "On Broadway", which was written by Barry Mann, Cynthia Weil, Jerry Leiber and Mike Stoller. This LP also contained Carmen's original version of "That's Rock and Roll", which became a No. 3 hit for Shaun Cassidy in 1977.

The album was Carmen's first solo production after leaving the Raspberries, a power pop group which scored several top 40 hits in the early 1970s.

== Songs ==
Eric Carmen wrote all of the songs on the album except for "On Broadway" (Barry Mann, Cynthia Weil, Mike Stoller and Jerry Leiber). Several of his songs interpolate classical melodies:

- "Never Gonna Fall in Love Again" is borrowed from Russian composer Sergei Rachmaninoff's Symphony No. 2 in E minor.
- "All By Myself" has elements from Rachmaninoff's Piano Concerto No. 2 in C minor.
- "My Girl" exploits a theme from Rachmaninoff's Piano Concerto No. 2.
- "Last Night" quotes Etude Op. 10 No. 3 by Frédéric Chopin.

== Track listing ==
All tracks are written by Eric Carmen, except where noted.

Side one
No.	Title	Writer(s)	Length
1.	"Sunrise"		5:21
2.	"That's Rock 'n' Roll"		3:10
3.	"Never Gonna Fall in Love Again"	Carmen; Sergei Rachmaninoff	3:45
4.	"All by Myself"	Carmen; Rachmaninoff	7:11
5.	"Last Night"		2:57

Side two
No.	Title	Writer(s)	Length
6.	"My Girl"		3:02
7.	"Great Expectations"		3:03
8.	"Everything"		2:01
9.	"No Hard Feelings"		5:40
10.	"On Broadway"	Barry Mann; Cynthia Weil; Jerry Leiber; Mike Stoller	3:26
Total length:			48:19

== Personnel ==
- Eric Carmen - piano, lead vocals, guitar
- Dan Hrdlicka - lead guitar, backing vocals
- Steve Knill - bass, backing vocals
- Richard Reising - synthesizer, organ, backing vocals
- Dwight Krueger, Michael McBride - drums, percussion, backing vocals
- Jackie Kelso - flute solo on "Never Gonna Fall in Love Again"
- Hugh McCracken - slide guitar solo on "All By Myself"

Technical

- Jack Sherdel - engineer
- Robert L. Heimall - art direction, design
- Norman Seeff - photography

== Charts ==
=== Weekly charts ===
Chart (1975/76)	Peak position
Australian Albums (Kent Music Report)	15
Canada Top Albums/CDs (RPM)	17
Swedish Albums (Sverigetopplistan)	41
UK Albums (OCC)	58
US Billboard 200	21

== Certifications ==
Region	Certification	Certified units/sales
Canada (Music Canada)	Gold	50,000^{^}
United States (RIAA)	Gold	500,000^{^}
^{^} Shipments figures based on certification alone.
