= Shaun Cassidy discography =

- Studio albums: 5
- Soundtrack albums: 1
- Live albums: 1
- Compilation albums: 1
- Singles: 17

This is the discography of American singer Shaun Cassidy.

== Albums ==
=== Studio albums ===
Title	Album details	Peak chart positions				Certifications
Title	Album details	US	AUS	CAN	SWE	Certifications
Shaun Cassidy	Released: June 1977; Label: Warner Bros./Curb; Formats: LP, MC, 8-track	3	16	2	24	US: Platinum; AUS: Gold; CAN: 2× Platinum
Born Late	Released: October 1977; Label: Warner Bros./Curb; Formats: LP, MC, 8-track	6	38	8	—	US: Platinum
Under Wraps	Released: July 1978; Label: Warner Bros./Curb; Formats: LP, MC, 8-track	33	68	27	—	US: Platinum
Room Service	Released: July 1979; Label: Warner Bros./Curb; Formats: LP, MC, 8-track	—	—	—	—	
Wasp	Released: September 1980; Label: Warner Bros.; Formats: LP, MC	—	—	—	—	
"—" denotes releases that did not chart or were not released in that territory.

=== Live albums ===
Title	Album details
That's Rock 'n' Roll Live	Released: October 1979; Label: Warner Bros./Curb; Formats: LP, MC, 8-track

=== Compilation albums ===
Title	Album details
Greatest Hits	Released: July 1992; Label: Curb; Formats: CD, MC

=== Music soundtrack albums ===
Title	Album details
Blood Brothers (with David Cassidy and Petula Clark)	Released: 1995; Label: First Night/Relativity; Formats: CD

== Singles ==
Title	Year	Peak chart positions								Certifications	Album
Title	Year	US	US AC	AUS	BEL (WA)	CAN	CAN AC	GER	NZ	Certifications	Album
"Morning Girl" (Note: "Morning Girl" was only released as a single in Europe, Australia and Japan.)	1976	—	—	—	—	—	—	40	—		Shaun Cassidy
"That's Rock 'n' Roll"	1976	3	—	2	—	1	—	11	—	US: Gold; AUS: Gold	Shaun Cassidy
"Da Doo Ron Ron"	1977	1	33	36	50	1	39	19	36	US: Gold; CAN: Gold	Shaun Cassidy
"Hey There Lonely Girl" (Note: "Hey There Lonely Girl" was only released as a single in Australia.)	1977	—	—	5	—	—	—	—	—		Shaun Cassidy
"Be My Baby" (Note: "Be My Baby" was only released as a single in Germany and Spain.)	1977	—	—	—	—	—	—	39	—		Shaun Cassidy
"Hey Deanie"	1977	7	—	29	—	23	—	—	—	US: Gold	Born Late
"Carolina's Comin' Home" (Note: "Carolina's Comin' Home" was only released as a single in the UK.)	1978	—	—	—	—	—	—	—	—		Born Late
"Do You Believe in Magic"	1978	31	—	—	—	39	—	—	—		Born Late
"Our Night"	1978	80	—	—	—	—	—	—	—		Under Wraps
"Midnight Sun"	1978	—	—	—	—	—	32	—	—		Under Wraps
"Hard Love" (Note: "Hard Love" was only released as a single in Germany, the UK and Japan.)	1978	—	—	—	—	—	—	—	—		Under Wraps
"You're Usin' Me"	1979	—	—	—	—	—	—	—	—		Room Service
"Are You Afraid of Me?"	1979	—	—	—	—	—	—	—	—		Room Service
"A Star Beyond Time" (Note: "A Star Beyond Time" is a recording of "Ilia's Theme" from Star Trek: The Motion Picture.)	1980	—	—	—	—	—	—	—	—		Non-album single
"Rebel, Rebel"	1980	—	—	—	—	—	—	—	—		Wasp
"So Sad About Us" (with Todd Rundgren and Utopia)	1980	—	—	—	—	—	—	—	—		Wasp
"Memory Girl" (Note: "Memory Girl" was only released as a single in Germany.)	1989	—	—	—	—	—	—	—	—		Non-album single
"—" denotes releases that did not chart or were not released in that territory.
