= Greatest Hits (Shaun Cassidy album) =

Greatest hits album by Shaun Cassidy
- Released: 1992
- Genre: Pop
- Label: Curb Records
- Producer: Michael Lloyd, Todd Rundgren

Shaun Cassidy chronology
Wasp (1980)	Greatest Hits (1992)	Blood Brothers (1995)

Greatest Hits is a compilation album by pop singer Shaun Cassidy. In 1992, Curb Records released a compilation of Cassidy's five studio albums. However, no songs were included from Cassidy's 1979 live album, That's Rock 'N' Roll Live.

It was given a four and a half star rating by AllMusic.

== Track listing ==
1. "Da Doo Ron Ron" (Phil Spector, Jeff Barry, Ellie Greenwich) 2:48
2. "That's Rock 'n' Roll" (Eric Carmen) 2:53
3. "Teen Dream" (Shaun Cassidy) 2:33
4. "Do You Believe in Magic" (John Sebastian) 2:16
5. "Hey Deanie" (Carmen) 3:37
6. "It's Like Heaven" (Ruston Pamphlin, Brian Wilson, Diane Rovell) 3:05
7. "Hard Love" (Cassidy) 3:40
8. "She's Right" (Cassidy) 3:33
9. "Break for the Street" (Cassidy) 4:25
10. "So Sad About Us" (Pete Townshend) 3:03
11. "Cool Fire" (Todd Rundgren, Cassidy, Roger Powell, John Wilcox) 4:15
12. "Once Bitten, Twice Shy" (Ian Hunter) 4:08
