= Hold Tight (Bread song) =

Song by Bread

from the album Lost Without Your Love
- Released: January 1977
- Recorded: 1976
- Genre: Soft rock
- Length: 3:05
- Label: Elektra
- Songwriter: David Gates
- Producer: David Gates

"Hold Tight"

Single by Vicki Sue Robinson

from the album Half and Half
- B-side: "Falling in Love"
- Released: August 1977
- Genre: Disco
- Label: RCA
- Songwriter: David Gates
- Producer: Warren Schatz

Vicki Sue Robinson singles chronology
"Should I Stay" / "I Won't Let You Go" (1977)	"Hold Tight" (1977)	"Trust in Me" (1978)

"'Hold Tight'" is a song written and composed by David Gates, and originally recorded by the pop-rock group Bread, of which Gates was the leader and primary music producer. It is a track from Bread's final LP, Lost Without Your Love from 1977.

== Vicki Sue Robinson cover ==
"Hold Tight" was covered by American actress and singer Vicki Sue Robinson in the summer of 1977. The single peaked at #67 on the U.S. Billboard Hot 100 during the summer of 1977. It was also a major dance hit, reaching #2. The song did not chart outside the U.S. It preceded the release of the album on which it was included, her 1978 LP Half and Half.

=== Chart performance ===
Chart (1977)	Peak position
U.S. Billboard Hot 100	67
U.S. Billboard Dance/Disco	2

== Other versions ==
- Shaun Cassidy recorded "Hold Tight" as a live performance version. It was included as a track on the extended version of his 1979 LP, That's Rock 'n' Roll Live.
