= Grammy Award for Best Pop Performance by a Duo or Group with Vocals =

Music award category

The Grammy Award for Best Pop Performance by a Duo or Group with Vocals was awarded between 1966 and 2011 (in its final year, it was awarded for recordings issued in 2010). The award had several minor name changes:

- From 1966 to 1967, the award was known as Best Contemporary (R&R) Performance - Group (Vocal or Instrumental)
- In 1968 it was awarded as Best Contemporary Group Performance (Vocal or Instrumental)
- In 1969 it was awarded as Best Contemporary-Pop Performance - Vocal Duo or Group
- In 1970 it was awarded as Best Contemporary Vocal Performance by a Group
- In 1971 it was awarded as Best Contemporary Vocal Performance by a Duo, Group or Chorus
- In 1972 it was awarded as Best Pop Vocal Performance by a Duo or Group
- From 1973 to 1977 it was awarded as Best Pop Vocal Performance by a Duo, Group or Chorus
- In 1978 it was awarded as Best Pop Vocal Performance by a Group
- In 1979 it was again awarded as Best Pop Vocal Performance by a Duo or Group
- In 1980 it was again awarded as Best Pop Vocal Performance by a Duo, Group or Chorus
- From 1981 to 2011 it was awarded as Best Pop Performance by a Duo or Group with Vocals

The award was discontinued from 2012 in a major overhaul of Grammy categories. From 2012, all duo or group performances in the pop field were shifted to the newly formed Best Pop Duo/Group Performance category.

A similar award for Best Performance by a Vocal Group was awarded from 1961 to 1968. This was also in the pop field, but did not specify pop music.

Years reflect the year in which the Grammy Awards were presented, for works released in the previous year.

== Recipients ==
Year^{[I]}	Winner(s)	Work	Nominees	Ref.
1966	The Statler Brothers	"Flowers on the Wall"	Help! – The Beatles; "Mrs. Brown, You've Got a Lovely Daughter" – Herman's Hermits; "Wooly Bully" – Sam the Sham and the Pharaohs; "Stop! In the Name of Love" – The Supremes	
1967	The Mamas & The Papas	"Monday, Monday"	"Cherish" – The Association; "Good Vibrations" – The Beach Boys; "Last Train to Clarksville" – The Monkees; "Guantanamera" – The Sandpipers	
1968	The 5th Dimension	"Up, Up and Away"	"Windy" – The Association; Sgt. Pepper's Lonely Hearts Club Band – The Beatles; "The Letter" – The Box Tops; "I'm a Believer" – The Monkees; "A Whiter Shade of Pale" – Procol Harum	
1969	Simon and Garfunkel	"Mrs. Robinson"	Child Is Father to the Man – Blood, Sweat & Tears; "Goin' Out of My Head / Can't Take My Eyes Off You" – The Lettermen; "The Fool On The Hill" – Sergio Mendes & Brazil '66; "Hey Jude" – The Beatles; "Woman, Woman" – Gary Puckett & The Union Gap	
1970	The 5th Dimension	"Aquarius/Let the Sunshine In"	Abbey Road - The Beatles; Blood, Sweat & Tears – Blood, Sweat & Tears; Crosby, Stills & Nash – Crosby, Stills & Nash; "Morning Girl" – The Neon Philharmonic	
1971	The Carpenters	"Close to You"	"Let It Be" – The Beatles; Chicago – Chicago; "ABC" – Jackson 5; '"Bridge over Troubled Water" – Simon & Garfunkel	
1972	The Carpenters	Carpenters	"How Can You Mend a Broken Heart" – Bee Gees; Jesus Christ Superstar – The London Cast; "All I Ever Need Is You" – Sonny & Cher; "Joy To The World" – Three Dog Night	
1973	Roberta Flack & Donny Hathaway	"Where Is the Love"	"A Horse with No Name" – America; "Baby I'm-a Want You" – Bread; "I'd Like to Teach the World to Sing (In Perfect Harmony)" – The New Seekers; "Summer Breeze" – Seals & Crofts	
1974	Gladys Knight & the Pips	"Neither One of Us (Wants to Be the First to Say Goodbye)"	"Sing" – The Carpenters; "Tie a Yellow Ribbon Round the Ole Oak Tree" – Tony Orlando & Dawn; "Diamond Girl" – Seals & Crofts; "Live And Let Die" – Paul McCartney & Wings	
1975	Paul McCartney & Wings	"Band on the Run"	Body Heat – Quincy Jones; "Rikki Don't Lose That Number" – Steely Dan; "You Make Me Feel Brand New" – The Stylistics; "Then Came You" – Dionne Warwick & The Spinners	
1976	Eagles	"Lyin' Eyes"	"Love Will Keep Us Together" – Captain & Tennille; "The Way We Were/Try to Remember" – Gladys Knight & The Pips; "My Little Town" – Simon & Garfunkel; A Capella II – The Singers Unlimited	
1977	Chicago	"If You Leave Me Now"	"I'd Really Love to See You Tonight" – England Dan & John Ford Coley; "Don't Go Breaking My Heart" – Elton John & Kiki Dee; "Bohemian Rhapsody" – Queen; "Afternoon Delight" – Starland Vocal Band	
1978	Bee Gees	"How Deep Is Your Love"	CSN – Crosby, Stills & Nash; Hotel California – Eagles; Rumours – Fleetwood Mac; Aja – Steely Dan	
1979	Bee Gees	Saturday Night Fever Soundtrack	"Three Times A Lady" – Commodores; "Got To Get You Into My Life" – Earth, Wind & Fire; "The Closer I Get to You" – Roberta Flack & Donny Hathaway; "FM (No Static At All)" – Steely Dan	
1980	The Doobie Brothers	Minute by Minute	"Sail On" – The Commodores; "Lonesome Loser" – Little River Band; "You Don't Bring Me Flowers" – Barbra Streisand & Neil Diamond; Breakfast In America – Supertramp	
1981	Barbra Streisand & Barry Gibb	"Guilty"	"Biggest Part of Me" – Ambrosia; "He's So Shy" – The Pointer Sisters; "Don't Fall in Love with a Dreamer" – Kenny Rogers & Kim Carnes; "Against the Wind" – Bob Seger & The Silver Bullet Band	
1982	The Manhattan Transfer	"The Boy from New York City"	Private Eyes – Hall & Oates; "Slow Hand" – The Pointer Sisters; "Endless Love" – Diana Ross & Lionel Richie; Gaucho – Steely Dan	
1983	Joe Cocker & Jennifer Warnes	"Up Where We Belong"	"Hard to Say I'm Sorry" – Chicago; "Maneater" – Hall & Oates; "Ebony and Ivory" – Paul McCartney & Stevie Wonder; "Rosanna" – Toto	
1984	The Police	"Every Breath You Take"	"Do You Really Want to Hurt Me" – Culture Club; "How Do You Keep the Music Playing?" – James Ingram & Patti Austin; "The Girl Is Mine" – Michael Jackson & Paul McCartney; "Islands in the Stream" – Kenny Rogers & Dolly Parton	
1985	The Pointer Sisters	"Jump (For My Love)"	"Drive" – The Cars; "Hard Habit to Break" – Chicago; "Wake Me Up Before You Go-Go" – Wham!; "Owner of a Lonely Heart" – Yes	
1986	USA for Africa	"We Are the World"	"Easy Lover" – Philip Bailey & Phil Collins; "I Want to Know What Love Is" – Foreigner; "The Power of Love" – Huey Lewis and the News; "Broken Wings" – Mr. Mister	
1987	Dionne Warwick, Elton John, Gladys Knight & Stevie Wonder	"That's What Friends Are For"	"The Next Time I Fall" – Peter Cetera & Amy Grant; "On My Own" – Patti LaBelle & Michael McDonald; "All I Need Is a Miracle" – Mike + The Mechanics; "Holding Back the Years" – Simply Red	
1988	Bill Medley & Jennifer Warnes	"(I've Had) The Time of My Life"	"Alone" – Heart; "La Bamba" – Los Lobos; "Somewhere Out There" – Linda Ronstadt & James Ingram; "Breakout" – Swing Out Sister	
1989	The Manhattan Transfer	Brasil	"Kokomo" – The Beach Boys; "Wild, Wild West" – The Escape Club; "Anything for You" – Gloria Estefan & Miami Sound Machine; "Piano in the Dark" – Brenda Russell & Joe Esposito	
1990	Linda Ronstadt & Aaron Neville	"Don't Know Much"	"Love Shack" – The B-52's; "She Drives Me Crazy" – Fine Young Cannibals; "The Living Years" – Mike + the Mechanics; "If You Don't Know Me By Now" – Simply Red	
1991	Linda Ronstadt & Aaron Neville	"All My Life"	"Roam" – The B-52's; "All I Wanna Do Is Make Love to You" – Heart; "Across the River" – Bruce Hornsby & the Range; "Unchained Melody" – The Righteous Brothers; "Hold On" – Wilson Phillips	
1992	R.E.M.	"Losing My Religion"	"More Than Words" – Extreme; "Right Here, Right Now" – Jesus Jones; The Commitments (Original Motion Picture Soundtrack) – The Stars from the Commitments; "You're In Love" – Wilson Phillips	
1993	Celine Dion & Peabo Bryson	"Beauty and the Beast"	"I Can't Dance" – Genesis; "Don't Let the Sun Go Down on Me" – George Michael & Elton John; "Diamonds & Pearls" – Prince & The New Power Generation; "Sometimes Love Just Ain't Enough" – Patty Smyth & Don Henley	
1994	Peabo Bryson & Regina Belle	"A Whole New World (Aladdin's Theme)"	"When I Fall in Love" – Celine Dion & Clive Griffin; "Man on the Moon" – R.E.M.; "The Music of the Night" – Barbra Streisand & Michael Crawford; "Love Is" – Vanessa Williams & Brian McKnight	
1995	All-4-One	"I Swear"	"The Sign" – Ace of Base; "Mmm Mmm Mmm Mmm" – Crash Test Dummies; "Stay (I Missed You)" – Lisa Loeb & Nine Stories; "I'll Stand by You" – The Pretenders	
1996	Hootie & the Blowfish	"Let Her Cry"	"I Can Love You Like That" – All-4-One; "Love Will Keep Us Alive" – Eagles; "I'll Be There For You" – The Rembrandts; "Waterfalls" – TLC	
1997	The Beatles	"Free as a Bird"	"As Long as It Matters" – Gin Blossoms; "When You Love a Woman" – Journey; "Fire on the Mountain" – The Neville Brothers; "Peaches" – The Presidents of the United States of America; "When You Wish Upon A Star" – Take 6	
1998	Jamiroquai	"Virtual Insanity"	"Silver Springs" – Fleetwood Mac; "MMMBop" – Hanson; "Don't Speak" – No Doubt; "Anybody Seen My Baby?" – The Rolling Stones	
1999	The Brian Setzer Orchestra	"Jump, Jive an' Wail"	"I Don't Want to Miss a Thing" – Aerosmith; "One Week" – Barenaked Ladies; "Iris" – Goo Goo Dolls; "Crush" – Dave Matthews Band	
2000	Santana	"Maria Maria"	"I Want It That Way" – Backstreet Boys; "Kiss Me" – Sixpence None the Richer; "All Star" – Smash Mouth; "Unpretty" – TLC	
2001	Steely Dan	"Cousin Dupree"	"Show Me The Meaning Of Being Lonely" – Backstreet Boys; "Pinch Me" – Barenaked Ladies; "Breathless" – The Corrs; "Bye Bye Bye" – *NSYNC	
2002	U2	"Stuck in a Moment You Can't Get Out Of"	"Shape of My Heart" – Backstreet Boys; "Superman (It's Not Easy)" – Five for Fighting; "Gone" – *NSYNC; "Imitation of Life" – R.E.M.	
2003	No Doubt	"Hey Baby"	"Everyday" – Bon Jovi; "Girl All The Bad Guys Want" – Bowling for Soup; "Where Are You Going" – Dave Matthews Band; "Girlfriend" – *NSYNC	
2004	No Doubt	"Underneath It All"	"Misunderstood" – Bon Jovi; "Hole in the World" – Eagles; "Stacy's Mom" – Fountains of Wayne; "Unwell" – Matchbox 20	
2005	Los Lonely Boys	"Heaven"	"My Immortal" – Evanescence; "The Reason" – Hoobastank; "She Will Be Loved" – Maroon 5; "It's My Life" – No Doubt	
2006	Maroon 5	"This Love (Live)"	"Don't Lie" – The Black Eyed Peas; "Mr. Brightside" – The Killers; "More Than Love" – Los Lonely Boys; "My Doorbell" – The White Stripes	
2007	The Black Eyed Peas	"My Humps"	"I Will Follow You Into The Dark" – Death Cab for Cutie; "Over My Head (Cable Car)" – The Fray; "Is It Any Wonder?" – Keane; "Stickwitu" – The Pussycat Dolls	
2008	Maroon 5	"Makes Me Wonder"	"(You Want to) Make a Memory" – Bon Jovi; "Home" – Daughtry; "Hey There Delilah" – Plain White T's; "Window in the Skies" – U2	
2009	Coldplay	"Viva la Vida"	"Waiting in the Weeds" – Eagles; "Going On" – Gnarls Barkley; "Won't Go Home Without You" – Maroon 5; "Apologize" – OneRepublic	
2010	The Black Eyed Peas	"I Gotta Feeling"	"We Weren't Born to Follow" – Bon Jovi; "Never Say Never" – The Fray; "Sara Smile" – Daryl Hall & John Oates; "Kids" – MGMT	
2011	Train	"Hey, Soul Sister (Live)"	"Don't Stop Believin' (Regionals Version)" – Glee Cast (Note: Nominated vocalists: Cory Monteith, Lea Michele, Chris Colfer, Amber Riley, Kevin McHale, Jenna Ushkowitz, Mark Salling and Naya Rivera); "Misery" – Maroon 5; "The Only Exception" – Paramore; "Babyfather" – Sade	

== Category facts ==
- Most wins:

Rank	1st
Artist	The Carpenters; The Black Eyed Peas; Maroon 5 No Doubt; Bee Gees; The Manhattan Transfer; Peabo Bryson; Linda Ronstadt; Aaron Neville; Jennifer Warnes; Gladys Knight
Total wins	2

- Most nominations

Rank	1st	2nd	3rd	4th	5th
Artist	The Beatles	Eagles; Steely Dan; Maroon 5	Bon Jovi; No Doubt	The Carpenters; The Black Eyed Peas; Hall & Oates; N Sync; R.E.M. Backstreet Boys; Barbra Streisand; Elton John; Linda Ronstadt; Gladys Knight; The Pointer Sisters	The Fray; U2; Los Lonely Boys; Dave Matthews Band; Barenaked Ladies; Bee Gees; TLC; Fleetwood Mac; All-4-One; Peabo Bryson; Celine Dion; The B-52's; Heart; Aaron Neville; Beach Boys; James Ingram; Stevie Wonder; Dionne Warwick; The Manhattan Transfer; Simply Red; Train; Jennifer Warnes
Total nominations	6	5	4	3	2
