= America! America! America! =

Live album by Pink Lady
- Released: 25 June 1978
- Recorded: 21–22 April 1978
- Venue: Tropicana, Las Vegas, Nevada, U.S.
- Genre: J-pop; kayōkyoku; disco; teen pop
- Length: 47:52
- Language: Japanese; English
- Label: Victor
- Producer: Hisahiko Iida

Pink Lady chronology
Bye Bye Carnival (1978)	America! America! America! (1978)	'78 Jumping Summer Carnival (1978)

America! America! America! (アメリカ!アメリカ!アメリカ!, Amerika! Amerika! Amerika!) is the fourth live album by Japanese idol duo Pink Lady. Recorded live at the Tropicana in Las Vegas, Nevada on April 21-22, 1978 during the duo's first American tour, the album was released on June 25, 1978. The concert was also broadcast in Japan as Pink Lady in Las Vegas (ピンク・レディーinラスベガス, Pinku Redī in Ras Begasu).

The album peaked at No. 6 on Oricon's weekly albums chart and sold over 80,000 copies.

== Track listing ==
Side A
No.	Title	Writer(s)	Length
1.	"Star Wars (スター・ウォーズ, Sutā Uōzu)"	John Williams	3:12
2.	"That's Me (ザッツ・ミー, Zattsu Mī)"	Benny Andersson; Björn Ulvaeus; Stig Anderson	3:16
3.	"Medley (メドレー, Medorē): "She'd Rather Be With Me" (あの娘はアイドル, Ano Musume wa Aidoru; "The Girl Is an Idol"); "Morning Girl" (素敵なモーニング・ガール, Suteki na Mōningu Gāru); "Da Doo Ron Ron" (ダ・ドゥ・ロン・ロン, Da Du Ron Ron)"	Garry Bonner; Alan Gordon; Tupper Saussy; Phil Spector; Jeff Barry; Ellie Greenwich	5:29
4.	"Sir Duke (愛するデューク, Aisuru Deyūku)"	Stevie Wonder	2:41
5.	"Stop! In the Name of Love (ストップ・イン・ザ・ネーム・オブ・ラブ, Sutoppu In za Nēmu obu Rabu)"	Holland–Dozier–Holland	3:03
6.	"Pepper Keibu (ペッパー警部, Peppā Keibu; "Inspector Pepper")"	Yū Aku; Shunichi Tokura	1:24
7.	"S.O.S."	Aku; Tokura	1:34
8.	"Without You (ウイザウト・ユー, Uizauto Yū)" (Mie solo)	Pete Ham; Tom Evans	3:49

Side B
No.	Title	Writer(s)	Length
1.	"The House of the Rising Sun (朝日のあたる家, Asahi no Atarui e)" (Kei solo)	Traditional; Alan Price	4:13
2.	"Carmen '77 (カルメン '77, Karumen Nanajū-nana)"	Aku; Tokura	1:53
3.	"Nagisa no Sindbad (渚のシンドバッド, Nagisa no Shindobaddo; "Sindbad of the Beach")"	Aku; Tokura	2:20
4.	"UFO"	Aku; Tokura	3:14
5.	"Southpaw (サウスポー, Sausupō)"	Aku; Tokura	3:43
6.	"Wanted (Shimei Tehai) (ウォンテッド（指名手配）, Uonteddo (Shimei Tehai); "Wanted (Fugitive Warrant)")"	Aku; Tokura	3:21
7.	"I Love How You Love Me (忘れたいのに, Wasuretai no Ni)"	Barry Mann; Larry Kolber	4:40

== Personnel ==
- Mie & Kei - vocals
- LA Orchestra & Chuck Rainey Rhythm Section

- Chuck Rainey - bass
- Mitch Holder - guitar
- Paul Leim - drums
- Mike Lang - keyboards
- Tadayuki Harada - conductor
- Norio Maeda - arrangement

== Charts ==
Chart (1978)	Peak position
Japan Oricon Albums Chart	6

== See also ==
- 1978 in Japanese music
