= Pierre Menard (disambiguation) =

Pierre Menard (1766-1844) was the first Lieutenant Governor of Illinois, United States.

Pierre Menard may also refer to:

- "Pierre Menard, Author of the Quixote", a fictional character by Jorge Luis Borges
- Pierre Menard (1941-1994), American violinist, concertmaster for The Neon Philharmonic, and second violinist for The Vermeer Quartet
