= Never Gonna Let You Go (album) =

Studio album by Vicki Sue Robinson
- Released: April 9, 1976
- Recorded: 1975–1976
- Studios: RCA Studios, New York City
- Genres: Disco, R&B
- Length: 34:15
- Label: RCA
- Producer: Warren Schatz

Vicki Sue Robinson chronology
Never Gonna Let You Go (1976)	Vicki Sue Robinson (1976)

Professional ratings
Review scores
Source	Rating
AllMusic	4/5 stars
Christgau's Record Guide	B

Never Gonna Let You Go is the debut album by singer-songwriter Vicki Sue Robinson. The album includes the hit "Turn the Beat Around". In 2010, Gold Legion Records remastered this album.

== Track listing ==
1. "Turn the Beat Around" – 5:35
2. "Common Thief" – 5:39
3. "Never Gonna Let You Go" – 4:22
4. "Wonderland of Love" – 3:46
5. "We Can Do Almost Anything" – 3:11
6. "Lack of Respect" – 3:03
7. "When You're Lovin' Me" – 4:17
8. "Act of Mercy" – 4:23

== Personnel ==
- Vicki Sue Robinson - Lead & Background Vocals
- Bhen Lanzaroni - Keyboards
- Bob Rose, Dick Frank - Guitar
- Stuart Woods - Bass
- Jimmy Young, Roy Markowitz - Drums
- Carlos Martin - Congas
- George Devens - Percussion
- Ray Armando - Congas, Percussion
- Alan Raph, Tom Malone, Tony Studd, Wayne Andre - Trombone
- Burt Collins, Joe Shepley - Trumpet
- Art Kaplan - Baritone Saxophone, Flute
- George Young - Tenor Saxophone, Flute

== Charts ==
Chart (1976)	Peak position
Australia (Kent Music Report)	78
Canada Top Albums/CDs (RPM)	27
US Billboard 200	49
US Billboard Top Soul Albums	39

=== Singles ===
Year	Single	Chart positions		
Year	Single	US Pop	US Soul	US Disco
1975	"Never Gonna Let You Go"	—	—	4
1976	"Turn The Beat Around"	10	73	1
1976	"Common Thief"	—	—	1
