= The Moth Confesses =

Studio album by The Neon Philharmonic
- Released: 1969
- Genre: Psychedelic pop; orchestral pop
- Length: 31:32
- Label: Warner Bros./Seven Arts; Sundazed; Rhino Records
- Producer: Don Gant; Bob McCluskey; Tupper Saussy

The Neon Philharmonic chronology
The Moth Confesses (1969)	The Neon Philharmonic (1969)

Professional ratings
Review scores
Source	Rating
Allmusic	Original Release link Sundazed Reissue link

The Moth Confesses is the 1969 debut album by The Neon Philharmonic. Described as "A Phonograph Opera," it was inspired, according to the liner notes, by a production of Samuel Barber's Antony and Cleopatra, which Saussy attended after The New York Times claimed that it was a terrible opera, and wanted to see what a terrible opera looked like, which he surmised was its deliberate attempt to appeal to a one-time audience. In response, he conceived this album as a condensed opera, with a moth-like protagonist, focused on the "literary theme" of desperation. Saussy did not imagine it could be staged like Tommy, but offered it up as a challenge.

"Morning Girl" was released as a single, backed with "Brilliant Colors", while "The New Life Out There" was used to promote the record as a contemporary opera in radio advertisements. "Morning Girl" hit #17 on the Billboard Hot 100 chart and was later covered by The Lettermen. Shaun Cassidy covered "Morning Girl, Later" with a few tweaked lyrics (omitting the reference to "Catherine" which complicates the song, implying that the protagonist now has a wife or daughter) and titled it "Morning, Girl." The songs primarily cover the topic of striking out towards a new life when relationships fail for various reasons.

== Track listing ==
All songs written by Tupper Saussy.

Side one

1. "Brilliant Colors" – 4:18
2. "Cowboy" – 2:18
3. "The New Life Out There" – 5:32
4. "Morning Girl" – 2:12

Side two

1. "Midsummer Night" – 5:44
2. "Little Sparrow" – 3:16
3. "The Last Time I Saw Jacqueline" – 3:42
4. "Morning Girl, Later" – 2:31

=== 1995 reissue ===
The album was reissued by Sundazed Music in 1995 with six bonus tracks. The six extra songs are noted to be more straightforward than the original songs found on the original album. The liner notes for this album were written by Andy Zax, who later compiled and produced Rhino's 2003 Neon Philharmonic anthology Brilliant Colors: The Complete Warner Brothers Recordings.

==== Bonus tracks ====
(All songs written by Tupper Saussy)

1. "Heighdy-Ho Princess" – 3:23
2. "Don't Know My Way Around My Soul" – 2:57
3. "Flowers for Your Pillow" – 2:17
4. "Clouds" – 2:39
5. "Snow" – 3:21
6. "To Be Continued" – 2:26

=== 2003 reissue ===
The album was reissued again in 2003 on Brilliant Colors: The Complete Warner Brothers Recordings (Rhino Records in collaboration with Warner Brothers/Seven Arts) in which it is the first eight tracks of Disc 1. The remainder of disc one is The Neon Philharmonic, while the bonus tracks that appear on the Sundazed edition are moved to the second disc with more songs as well as mono single versions of songs from the albums. The album cover is reproduced in CD size with the original liner notes provided in larger print in the booklet.

"The Last Time I Saw Jacqueline" features excerpts from two Johann Sebastian Bach ariosos, including a different section of the one quoted in The Beatles's "Hey Jude", while "Little Sparrow" is actually about Mickey Newbury's stay in Saussy's family's guest room.

== Personnel ==
=== The Band ===
- Kenneth A. Buttrey - drums
- Jerry Carrigan - Drums
- Don Gant - vocals
- Dennis Good - Trombone, Brass
- Rufus Long - Flute, Piccolo, Wind
- Pierre Menard - Strings, Concert Master
- Norbert Putnam - Bass, Rhythm
- Tupper Saussy - Conductor, Piano, Harpsichord, keyboards
- Don Sheffield - Trumpet, Brass
- Chuck Wyatt - Flute, Piccolo, Wind
- Chip Young - Guitar, Rhythm

=== Additional musicians ===
- Ray Stevens - Rhythm
- George Tidwell - Trumpet, Brass
- Norris Wilson - Rhythm

=== Technical Staff ===
- Chris Athens - Mastering
- Don Gant - producer, engineer
- Ronald Gant - engineer
- Bob Irwin - Mastering, Compilation Producer
- Bob McCluskey - producer
- Tupper Saussy - arranger, producer
- Glenn Snoddy - Engineer

== Charts ==
USA - Singles

Year	Chart	Song	Peak Position
1969	Pop Singles	"Morning Girl"	#17

"Morning Girl" was so popular at the time that the reference to Cheerios sparked interest from General Mills to arrange the song for Bobby Bloom as part of a promotion for a premium for a doll called Beautiful Dawn.
