= Turn the Beat Around =

1976 single by Vicki Sue Robinson

Single by Vicki Sue Robinson

from the album Never Gonna Let You Go
- B-side: "Lack of Respect"
- Released: February 1976
- Recorded: September 26, 1975
- Genre: Disco
- Length: 5:35 (LP); 3:21 (single)
- Label: RCA Victor
- Songwriters: Gerald Jackson; Peter Jackson
- Producer: Warren Schatz

Vicki Sue Robinson singles chronology
| "Baby Now That I Found You" (1975) | "Turn the Beat Around" (1976) | "Never Gonna Let You Go" (1976) |

"Turn the Beat Around" is a disco song written by Gerald Jackson and Peter Jackson, and performed by American actress and singer Vicki Sue Robinson in 1976 (see 1976 in music), originally appearing on her debut album, Never Gonna Let You Go (1976). Released as a single in February 1976 by RCA Victor, the song went to number ten on the US Billboard pop charts, and number 73 on the Billboard soul chart. The song earned Robinson a Grammy nomination for Best Female Pop Vocal Performance. The track also went to number one on the Billboard disco chart for four weeks. "Turn the Beat Around" is considered a disco classic and is featured on many compilation albums. In 2000, VH1 ranked it number 30 in their list of "100 Greatest Dance Songs".

== Background ==
"Turn the Beat Around" was written by brothers Gerald and Peter Jackson of the R&B outfit Touch of Class. Peter Jackson knew Al Garrison, an engineer at Associated Studios in New York, through Jackson's work as a session drummer, and it was at Associated Studios that Touch of Class cut its own demos. Peter Jackson recalls that one Sunday at noontime "I called Al and said...we want to come in and [cut a] demo...He was leaving at four...He said: 'My girl[friend]’s coming to pick me up for dinner. You have to be done [by then]."

Garrison's girlfriend turned out to be Vicki Sue Robinson, a singer whose debut album had been delayed pending the recording of one additional track. On arriving at Associated Studios that Sunday, Robinson overheard the playback of the "Turn the Beat Around" demo which Touch of Class had just recorded and according to Peter Jackson said: "Oh, man, I’ve gotta have that song." Gerald and Peter Jackson initially demurred, as they wanted the song for Touch of Class' own debut album.

Peter Jackson - "Monday [the next day], Gerald and I go up to Midland [Touch of Class' label]. We’re excited because we know this song ["Turn the Beat Around"] is slammin’...[Midland] took the other four songs and they passed on that one. They said: 'We don't like that one. The lyrics move too fast. You have that jungle beat in there. It's not what's happening'." Peter Jackson resultantly called Vicki Sue Robinson to give her the song for her album. When Jackson told Robinson: "'I'll meet you down on Thirty-Fourth Street [with the demo]' she said: 'I [already] made Al give me a copy.'"

Robinson recorded "Turn the Beat Around" on September 26, 1975, cutting her lead vocal in a single take after recording her own multi-tracked chorale vocals. Like the other cuts on Robinson's debut album Never Gonna Let You Go, "Turn the Beat Around" was recorded at RCA Studios with producer Warren Schatz who recalls the basic master of the song was recorded "on a Friday after a very depressing week of rain [and] I hated [the track]! I listened to it in my office and I just couldn't get it. It had been such a bad week that I just couldn't hear anything with an open mind. Then David Todd, the head of disco promotion at RCA, came into my office and he went crazy over the track! He convinced me to finish it as soon as possible."

Issued as a single in February 1976 "Turn the Beat Around" became a club smash subsequently breaking on Top 40 radio in Boston - where it would reach #1 that June - to make a gradual ascent on the national Pop chart: the Billboard Hot 100 to reach a #10 peak in August 1976.

== Charts ==
=== Weekly charts ===
| Chart (1976) | Peak position |
|---|---|
| Australia (Kent Music Report) | 28 |
| Belgium (Ultratop Flanders) | 17 |
| Belgium (Ultratop Wallonia) | 35 |
| Canada Top Singles (RPM) | 14 |
| France (SNEP) | 44 |
| Netherlands (Dutch Top 40) | 12 |
| Netherlands (Single Top 100) | 11 |
| South Africa (Springbok Radio) | 12 |
| US Billboard Hot 100 | 10 |
| US Easy Listening (Billboard) | 43 |
| US Hot Dance/Disco (Billboard) | 1 |
| US Soul Singles (Billboard) | 73 |
| US Cash Box Top 100 | 15 |

=== Year-end charts ===
| Chart (1976) | Rank |
|---|---|
| Canada Top Singles (RPM) | 129 |
| US Billboard Hot 100 | 38 |
| US Cash Box Top 100 | 67 |

== Laura Branigan version ==
"Turn the Beat Around"

Single by Laura Branigan

from the album Laura Branigan
- Released: 1990
- Recorded: 1990
- Genre: Dance-pop; Hi-NRG
- Length: 4:22
- Label: Atlantic
- Songwriters: Gerald Jackson; Peter Jackson
- Producers: Laura Branigan; Steve Lindsey

Laura Branigan singles chronology
| "Never in a Million Years" (1990) | "Turn the Beat Around" (1990) | "Didn't We Almost Win It All" (1993) |

Music video
- "Turn the Beat Around (Live)" on YouTube

American singer-songwriter and actress Laura Branigan covered the song in 1990, becoming the first major artist to do so. It was released as the third and final single from her self-titled sixth studio album (1990), however only to radio and clubs. The song was co-produced by Branigan and Steve Lindsey for the album, with several remix versions following garnering significant play in Hi-NRG clubs.

=== Critical reception ===
Bill Coleman from Billboard magazine wrote, "Trend-conscious rendition of Vicki Sue Robinson's disco classic lacks the spark needed to ignite widespread action, though Branigan's sonic vocal attack is always a treat."

=== Track listings ===
2 Track 12" single
| No. | Title | Length |
|---|---|---|
| 1. | "Turn the Beat Around" (Popcussion mix) | 7:42 |
| 2. | "Turn the Beat Around" (Don & Vic mix) | 6:25 |

Promo 12" single
| No. | Title | Length |
|---|---|---|
| 1. | "Turn the Beat Around" (Popcussion mix) | 7:42 |
| 2. | "Turn the Beat Around" (Don & Vic mix) | 6:25 |
| 3. | "Turn the Beat Around" (Club House mix) | 6:35 |
| 4. | "Turn the Beat Around" (The Branipella mix) | 3:53 |
| 5. | "Turn the Beat Around" (Radio edit) | 4:05 |

== Gloria Estefan version ==
"Turn the Beat Around"

Single by Gloria Estefan

from the album Hold Me, Thrill Me, Kiss Me
- Released: September 23, 1994
- Recorded: 1993–1994
- Genre: Dance-pop; disco
- Length: 3:52
- Label: Epic
- Songwriters: Gerald Jackson; Peter Jackson
- Producers: Emilio Estefan Jr.; Lawrence Dermer

Gloria Estefan singles chronology
| "Ayer" (1993) | "Turn the Beat Around" (1994) | "Hold Me, Thrill Me, Kiss Me" (1994) |

Music video
- "Turn the Beat Around" on YouTube

In 1994, the song was recorded by Cuban-American singer and songwriter Gloria Estefan for the soundtrack to the film The Specialist, starring Sylvester Stallone and Sharon Stone. It was produced by Estefan's husband Emilio Estefan Jr. and Lawrence Dermer, and is also featured on Estefan's fourth solo album, Hold Me, Thrill Me, Kiss Me (1994). Released as a single in September 1994 by Epic Records, the song became a hit, reaching number 13 on the US Billboard Hot 100. Estefan also took the song to the top spot on Billboard's Hot Dance Club Play chart, making it her first number-one song on that chart in English. In Australia and New Zealand the song charted at number eight and 18. In Europe, the song was a top-20 hit in Finland and a top-30 hit in the United Kingdom, Scotland, the Netherlands and Belgium. The accompanying music video was directed by Marcus Nispel, depicting Estefan performing with her band atop a skyscraper. She later performed the song as her opening performance in VH1's first ever Divas Live in 1998.

=== Background and release ===
In November 1994, Estefan told Billboard magazine about the song, "When I first heard 'Turn the Beat Around', I'd been in the [ Miami Sound Machine ] for about a year, I guess. They were called the Latin Boys back than, and we played lots of covers because we didn't have material of our own. I remember hearing 'Turn the Beat Around' and right away thinking it was something we could do. It's very much my style, and pretty close to the sound of the band. With the horns and the rhythm, it's like something we would do. We used to play 'I Will Survive', 'Turn the Beat', and a lot of those early disco songs. We didn't really record songs that sounded disco, but we certainly enjoyed playing it."

Estefan released her cover of the song on 23 September 1994 by Epic Records and included it on her fourth album, Hold Me, Thrill Me, Kiss Me, which was released in October same year. The song was also included on the soundtrack to The Specialist, which was released on 7 October 1994.

=== Critical reception ===
Larry Flick from Billboard magazine felt Estefan "has not delivered a pop single with this much verve and energy in a long while. The groove is reminiscent of her own classic 'Conga', and it is wrapped in delicious layers of live strings and horns. An inspired pairing of song and artist that will likely spark heavy top 40 and club activity." Josef Woodard from Entertainment Weekly stated that Estefan's "easygoing charms still do the trick" on the song. Joey Guerra from Houston Chronicle named it a "pulsing rendition", while Jeremy Griffin from The Ithacan named it a "rousing cover". Chuck Campbell from Knoxville News Sentinel complimented Estefan as "a natural" to remake the disco classic.

Pan-European magazine Music & Media noted that here, the singer "revives her Miami Sound Machine days of fatback disco". Alan Jones from Music Week gave the song a score of three out of five, describing it as "an intoxicating mix of Latin rhythms and disco sensibilities. Likely to earn her a substantial hit." John Kilgo from The Network Forty declared it as a "classic" remake of the 1976 "Top 10 gem", adding that it has "uptempo flavor spiced with trademark Miami Sound Machine overtones". People Magazine called it "an exuberant run" through Robinson's disco classic, that "demand repeated listens." Brad Beatnik from the Record Mirror Dance Update viewed it as "fairly standard disco fare" from Estefan.

=== Retrospective response ===
AllMusic editor Eddie Huffman complimented the song as a "brilliant pop hit". Pip Ellwood-Hughes from Entertainment Focus ranked it among Estefan's 10 best songs, descring it as a "raucous dance number". In a 2015 retrospective review of Hold Me, Thrill Me, Kiss Me, Phil Shanklin of ReviewsRevues felt that this is "an excellent choice for Gloria whose voice is similar to Vicki Sue’s". He also remarked that it has "the same Latin vibe as the best of Miami Sound Machine". In 2018, Australian music channel Max included Estefan's "Turn the Beat Around" in their list of "1000 Greatest Songs of All Time".

=== Music video ===
A music video was produced to promote the single, directed by German feature film director and producer Marcus Nispel. It was filmed in Downtown Miami and Estefan was seven months pregnant at the time. Anouk F. Nora produced the video and Joseph Yacoe directed photography. It features Estefan performing with her band atop a large building while helicopters are flying in the air above them. In between, there are clips from the movie The Specialist, which starred Sylvester Stallone and Sharon Stone. The video for "Turn the Beat Around" was later made available on Estefan's official YouTube channel in 2013, and had generated more than 12 million views as of March 2025.

=== Charts and certifications ===
==== Weekly charts ====
| Chart (1994) | Peak position |
|---|---|
| Australia (ARIA) | 8 |
| Belgium (Ultratop 50 Flanders) | 24 |
| Canada Retail Singles (The Record) | 10 |
| Canada Top Singles (RPM) | 26 |
| Canada Dance/Urban (RPM) | 7 |
| Europe (Eurochart Hot 100) | 66 |
| Europe (European AC Radio) | 6 |
| Europe (European Hit Radio) | 9 |
| Finland (IFPI) | 15 |
| Germany (Media Control Charts) | 51 |
| Netherlands (Dutch Top 40) | 33 |
| Netherlands (Single Top 100) | 27 |
| New Zealand (RIANZ) | 18 |
| Scotland (OCC) | 29 |
| UK Singles (OCC) | 21 |
| UK Dance (OCC) | 38 |
| UK Airplay (Music Week) | 10 |
| UK Dance (Music Week) | 38 |
| UK Club Chart (Music Week) | 53 |
| US Billboard Hot 100 | 13 |
| US Hot Adult Contemporary Tracks (Billboard) | 4 |
| US Hot Dance Club Play (Billboard) | 1 |
| US Mainstream Top 40 (Billboard) | 20 |
| US Maxi-Singles Sales (Billboard) | 4 |
| US Rhythmic Airplay (Billboard) | 31 |
| US Cash Box Top 100 | 14 |

==== Year-end charts ====
| Chart (1994) | Rank |
|---|---|
| Australia (ARIA) | 92 |
| Netherlands (Dutch Top 40) | 252 |
| UK Singles (OCC) | 186 |
| US Hot Dance Club Play (Billboard) | 48 |

| Chart (1995) | Rank |
|---|---|
| Australia (ARIA) | 73 |
| US Billboard Hot 100 | 87 |

==== Certifications ====
| Region | Certification | Certified units/sales |
|---|---|---|
| Australia (ARIA) | Gold | 35,000^{^} |
| United States (RIAA) | Gold | 500,000^{^} |
^{^} Shipments figures based on certification alone.

== Other versions and appearances in media ==
- Anita Sarawak covered the song for her 1978 album Dancing In The City.
- The chorus is used in the lead out of the 1982 Soft Cell song "Memorabilia".
- Lil Suzy covered the song for her 1993 album Back to Dance. It was released as the lead single.
- Cobra Starship covered the song for the MTV movie of the same name.
- The Chipettes covered the song for the 1996 album Club Chipmunk: The Dance Mixes.
- The song was used in 2001 Polish action-comedy movie "Bulgarski Pościkk" directed by Bartosz Walaszek and Grzegorz Paraska.
- In the second Star Wars Family Guy episode, the song is parodied as "Turn the Ship Around".
- In 2003, the Gloria Estefan's version is used in Mitsubishi Kuda Grandia advertisement in Indonesia along with the three Bon Jovi songs: It's My Life, Always and Everyday.
- The 2005 song "Perfection" by Dannii Minogue and the Soul Seekerz samples "Turn the Beat Around".
- A 2009 television advertisement for "I Can't Believe It's Not Butter" featuring Megan Mullally contains the parody "Turn the Tub Around".
- This song was covered many times on American Idol. Both Carmen Rasmusen and Diana DeGarmo performed this song at the Top 6 of American Idol Season 2 and Season 3, respectively. Haley Scarnato also covered this on the sixth season of American Idol. Jessica Sanchez performed the song on the Top 12 of American Idol Season 11.
- This song appeared in King of the Hill Season 6 episode My Own Private Rodeo.
- This song appeared in The Sopranos Season 1 episode The Legend of Tennessee Moltisanti.
- This song is featured on the 2012 movie Pitch Perfect, as part of the performance by the group Barden Bellas.
- The song appeared in the 2015 movie The Martian directed by Ridley Scott and starring Matt Damon.
- The song is featured in the 2016 Netflix series "The Get Down" created by Baz Luhrmann.
- The Vicki Sue Robinson recording of the song appears in the 2016 episode of the drama Elementary, “Turn it Upside-Down”.
- The beat from the Vikki Sue Robinson original was used in the Jam & Spoon trance classic Odyssey to Anyoona.
