= That's Rock 'n' Roll Live =

That's Rock 'N' Roll Live

Live album by Shaun Cassidy
- Released: 1979
- Genre: Pop
- Label: Warner Bros.
- Producer: Michael Lloyd

Shaun Cassidy chronology
| Under Wraps (1978) | That's Rock 'N' Roll Live (1979) | Room Service (1979) |

To capture the sensation of teen-idol Shaun Cassidy, Warner Bros. Records released a live album of his 1979 concert tour named That's Rock 'N' Roll Live. The album featured songs from his four studio albums (Shaun Cassidy, Born Late, Under Wraps and the then-forthcoming album Room Service). The album also featured a cover of The Righteous Brothers' hit song, "You've Lost That Lovin' Feelin'".

The cover of the album features a glossy photo of Cassidy playing a black Gibson Les Paul guitar.

The live version of "Da Doo Ron Ron" features the band The Crystals backing up Cassidy.

== Track listing ==
1. "Break for the Street" (Shaun Cassidy)
2. "Hey Deanie" (Eric Carmen)
3. "She's Right" (Shaun Cassidy)
4. "You've Lost That Lovin' Feelin'" (Phil Spector, Barry Mann, Cynthia Weil)
5. "Hard Love" (Shaun Cassidy)
6. "That's Rock 'n' Roll" (Eric Carmen)
7. "Bad Boy" (Larry Williams)
8. "Slow Down" (Larry Williams)
9. "Rip It Up" (Larry Williams)
10. "Da Doo Ron Ron" (Phil Spector, Jeff Barry, Ellie Greenwich)

Bonus tracks (Extended version)

1. "Hold Tight"
2. "Taxi Dancer"
3. "Midnight Sun"
4. "For the Song"
5. "Walk Away"
6. "Twist and Shout"

== Personnel ==
- Shaun Cassidy - vocals, guitar, piano
- Joey Newman - lead guitar
- Michael Lloyd - rhythm guitar, background vocals
- Dennis Belfield - bass
- Jay Gruska, Jimmy Greenspoon - keyboards, background vocals
- Carlos Vega - drums
- David Jolliffe - percussion, background vocals
- Mike Altschul - saxophone, flute
- John D'Andrea - saxophone, synthesizer
- The Crystals - background vocals on "Da Doo Ron Ron"
