= Touch of Class (band) =

American Soul/R&B musical group

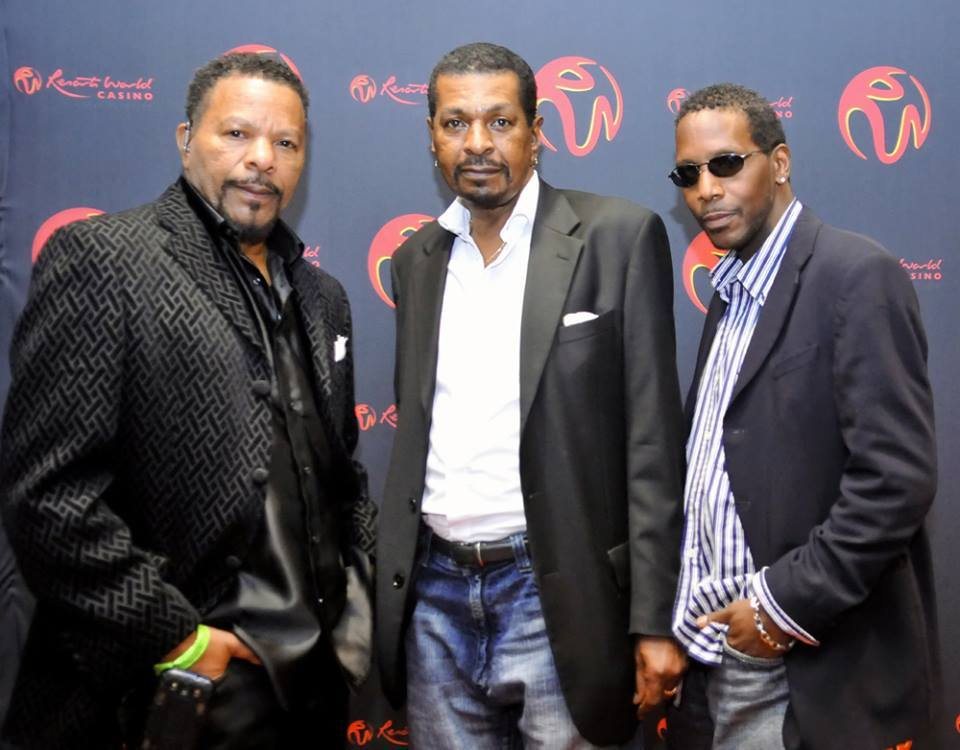
- (From left to right) Gerald Jackson, Pete Jackson and Hamp Dickerson in 2015

Background information
- Origin: Philadelphia, United States
- Genres: Soul / R&B
- Years active: 1975–present
- Label: Midland / RCA / Atlantic
- Members: Gerald Jackson*; Pete Jackson*; Hamp Dickerson
- Past members: Michael Hailstock*; Herbert Brevard* * Original Members
- Website: Website

Touch of Class is an American soul/R&B musical group from Philadelphia, Pennsylvania, that had a number of hits in the 1970s including, "I'm in Heaven", "Don't Want No Other Lover", "You Got to Know Better", and "I Need Action".

== History ==
=== Career ===
Touch of Class was formed in Philadelphia, Pennsylvania, with the brothers, Gerald Jackson and Pete Jackson, Herbert Brevard and Michael Hailstock. The band was active from the mid-1970s until mid-1980s. Touch of Class debut album, "I'm I Heaven" was recorded at the Sigma Sound Studios in Philadelphia, with some of the musicians from Salsoul Orchestra in the session. Their debut single, which is the title track of the album was written by, brothers Melvin and Mervin Steals and produced by John Davis. "I'm In Heaven" was released in October 1975 on Midland International Records, and spent 11 weeks on the Billboard R&B Chart peaking at #65. The song along with the B-side,"I Love You Pretty" written by the Jackson brothers and Hailstock.

In 1976, they released a single, "Don't Want No Other Love" written by the Steals brothers, which spent three weeks on the R&B singles chart, peaking at No. 85. 1976 proved to be a big year for Pete and Gerald Jackson when Vicki Sue Robinson recorded and released a song they wrote, "Turn the Beat Around". The song topped the Billboard dance chart, and reached No. 10 on the Billboard Hot 100 and No. 73 on the Billboard R&B singles chart. It ranked as the 38th top song on Billboard's year-end chart.

In 1977, the group released two singles, "Said It" and "You Got to Know Better", both written by the Jackson brothers and produced by John Davis. "You Got to Know Better" spent eight weeks on the Billboard R&B singles chart and peaked at No. 45.

By 1979, Michael Hailstock left the group to concentrate on songwriting and the band turned into a trio. They released a single on a new label, Roadshow Records entitled, "I Need Action" written by the Jackson brothers and produced by them and Rafael Charres. The single spent 6 weeks on the chart and peaked at #62.

Their second album, the self-titled Touch of Class was released in 1979 and included their version of "Turn the Beat Around".

Besides their own work, the Jacksons did background vocals and studio work, mostly for Clarence Burke, Jr. of The Invisible Man's Band and The Five Stairsteps.

Touch of Class released two singles in the 1980s entitled, "Keep Dancin'" in 1984 and "Let Me Be Your Everything" in 1985. Both singles were written by the Jackson brothers and released on Atlantic Records.

=== Recent years ===
In 2005, the brothers continued performing on the Classic Soul Circuit with new member Hamp Dickerson. In 2014, they released the album, Back to the Future, on Libra Brothers Music. As of 2020, Touch of Class are celebrating their 45th anniversary in the music industry.

== Members ==
Formed in Philadelphia in 1975

- Pete Jackson (1975–present)
- Gerald Jackson (1975–present)
- Michael Hailstock (1975-1979)
- Herbert Brevard (1975-1979)
- Hamp Dickerson (2005–present)

== Discography ==
=== Albums ===
Year	Album	Record label
1975	I'm in Heaven	Midland International / RCA
1979	Touch of Class	Roadshow / RCA Records
1981	Love Means Everything	Stack-O-Hits
2014	Back to the Future	Libra Brothers Music

=== Singles ===
Year	Title	Peak chart positions
Year	Title	US R&B
1975	I'm in Heaven	65
1975	B/W I Love You Pretty Baby	—
1976	"Don't Want No Other Lover"	85
1976	"You Got to Know Better	45
1977	Said It Before	—
1979	I Need Action	62
1984	Keep Dancin'	—
1985	Let Me Be Your Everything	—
"—" denotes a recording that did not chart.
