= Under Wraps (Shaun Cassidy album) =

Studio album by Shaun Cassidy
- Released: July 1978
- Recorded: Early-mid 1978
- Genre: Pop
- Label: Warner Bros.
- Producer: Michael Lloyd

Shaun Cassidy chronology
Born Late (1977)	Under Wraps (1978)	That's Rock 'N' Roll Live (1979)

Under Wraps is the third studio album by American singer Shaun Cassidy, released in 1978. Less successful commercially than its two predecessors Shaun Cassidy and Born Late, Under Wraps was an early indication that Cassidy's popularity was beginning to lose momentum, as the album barely cracked the top 40 on the US Billboard Hot 100 chart, peaking at #33, and scoring no major hit singles. "Our Night" peaked at #80 on the US Hot 100.

The album features the song "It's Like Heaven", which was co-written by founding Beach Boys member Brian Wilson, along with Rocky Pamplin and Diane Rovell. Wilson also co-wrote the song "Cruisin' to Harlem" on the 1976 album Getting It in the Street by David Cassidy, Shaun Cassidy's half-brother.

== Critical reception ==
The Globe and Mail wrote that "the musical slickness that the best corporate money can buy has pushed his latest record into competition in the musical (as well as the television-fanzine) market, really the first time that one of his records hasn't brought an immediate, incredulous shower of derision."

== Track listing ==
1. "Hard Love" (Shaun Cassidy)
2. "Taxi Dancer" (Cassidy)
3. "Lie to Me" (Bill LaBounty, Jay Senter)
4. "One More Night of Your Love" (Erich Bulling, Roger Atkins)
5. "It's Like Heaven" (Rocky Pamplin, Brian Wilson, Diane Rovell)
6. "Our Night" (Bruce Roberts, Carole Bayer Sager)
7. "She's Right" (Cassidy)
8. "Midnight Sun" (Peter McCann)
9. "Right Before Your Skies" (Cassidy)

== Personnel ==
- Shaun Cassidy - vocals, guitar, keyboards
- Ben Benay, Davey Johnstone, Jay Graydon, Joey Newman, John Morell, Michael Lloyd - guitar
- Dee Murray, Dennis Belfield, Jim Hughart - bass guitar
- Greg Mathieson, Jim Greenspoon, Michael Lang, Tom Hensley, Michael Lloyd - keyboards
- Carlos Vega - drums
- Alan Estes - percussion
- John D'Andrea - saxophone
- Bill Champlin, Bobby Kimball, Carmen Twillie, Gene Merlino, Jackie Ward, Jim Haas, Melissa Mackay, Myrna Matthews, Ron Hicklin, Sally Stevens, Tom Kelly, Vennette Gloud - background vocals
- Humberto Gatica - remix

== Charts ==
Chart (1978)	Peak position
Australian (Kent Music Report)	68
US Billboard 200	33
