= Blood Brothers (1995 album) =

Cast recording by David Cassidy, Shaun Cassidy, Petula Clark
- Released: 1995
- Genre: Showtunes
- Length: 60:42
- Label: Relativity Records

Blood Brothers: The International Recording is a 1995 studio cast recording of the Willy Russell musical Blood Brothers. The album features David Cassidy, Shaun Cassidy, and Petula Clark, with Russell himself as the Narrator.

== Background ==
The album was the third release of a Blood Brothers cast recording; the earlier versions featured the original 1983 cast (including Barbara Dickson as Mrs. Johnstone) and 1988 cast (with Kiki Dee as Mrs. Johnstone).

In 1995, a recording of the then London cast, including Stephanie Lawrence as Mrs. Johnstone and Warwick Evans as the Narrator was also produced. Many of the instrumental tracks appeared on both the International and London recordings.

== Cast biographies ==
Blood Brothers marked the first time Shaun Cassidy and David Cassidy appeared together on an album, having both previously had successful careers as pop artists. (The next would be only a year later when they sang in a trio with brother Patrick Cassidy on "You Could Drive a Person Crazy", released on the live recording Sondheim: A Celebration). Blood Brothers is the first time Shaun Cassidy had appeared on an album in 15 years. His previous appearance on an album was in 1980 during his teen idol career when he released his fifth solo album, Wasp. To date, Blood Brothers was the sixth time Shaun released new material on an album.

David Cassidy (Shaun's half-brother), however, had released solo albums throughout the 1990s, and Blood Brothers represented his first musical-theatre album. Following Blood Brothers, David (unlike Shaun) continued to perform as a headliner of musical theatre throughout the 1990s, including the Las Vegas shows EFX and At The Copa.

Petula Clark also continued to perform as a headliner of musical theatre, including an extensive tour of the musical Sunset Boulevard.

== Track listing ==
1. "Overture"
2. "Marilyn Monroe"
3. "My Child"
4. "Easy Terms"
5. "Shoes upon the Table"
6. "July 18"
7. "Kids' Game"
8. "Gypsies in the Wood"
9. "Long Sunday Afternoon/My Friend"
10. "Bright New Day"
11. "Entr'acte/Marilyn Monroe (2)"
12. "Secrets"
13. "That Guy"
14. "Summer Sequence"
15. "I'm Not Saying a Word"
16. "One Day in October"
17. "Take a Letter Miss Jones"
18. "Robbery"
19. "Marilyn Monroe (3)"
20. "Light Romance/Madman"
21. "Council Chamber"
22. "Tell Me It's Not True"
