= Haun Saussy =

American academic (born 1960)

- Born: Caleb Powell Haun Saussy; February 15, 1960 (age 66); Nashville, Tennessee, United States
- Education: Duke University (BA); École pratique des hautes études Institut national des langues et civilisations orientales Yale University (MPhil, PhD)
- Occupation: Professor
- Spouse: Olga V. Solovieva
- Children: 5
- Parent(s): Lola Haun Saussy and Tupper Saussy
- Website: www.printculture.com

Caleb Powell Haun Saussy (born February 15, 1960) is an American professor of comparative literature at the University of Chicago.

== Life ==
Raised in suburban Nashville, Tennessee, he attended Deerfield Academy before earning his B.A. in comparative literature and classics (Greek) from Duke University in 1981. Between his undergraduate and graduate studies, he focused on linguistics and also studied Chinese at École Pratique des Hautes Etudes (1981-1982) and Institut National des Langues et Cultures Orientales (1982-1983) in Paris and Taiwan (1984-1985). He subsequently received his M.Phil. and Ph.D. in comparative literature from Yale University in 1987 and 1990, respectively.

Saussy served as an assistant professor (1990-1995) and associate professor (1995-1997) at the University of California, Los Angeles. He later held positions as associate professor and full professor in the Department of Comparative Literature at Stanford University (2002-2004) before joining the faculty at Yale University in 2004 as a Professor of Comparative Literature, East Asian Languages & Literatures, and International and Area Studies). In 2011, He transitioned to the University of Chicago.

His editorial responsibilities include serving as co-editor for Chinese Literature: Essays, Articles, Reviews and Critical Inquiry. He is also a member of the editorial boards for Zhongguo Xueshu/China Scholarship, Comparative Literature, Warring States Papers, Modern Philology, Cross-Currents, and Health and Human Rights, among others.

== Books ==
- The Problem of a Chinese Aesthetic (Stanford University Press, 1993)
- Great Walls of Discourse and Other Adventures in Cultural China (Harvard University Asia Center, 2001)
- The Ethnography of Rhythm: Orality and Its Technologies (Fordham University Press, 2016)
- Translation as Citation: Zhuangzi Inside Out (Oxford University Press, 2017)
- The Making of Barbarians: Chinese Literature and Multilingual Asia (Princeton University Press, 2022)
- Ed., Women Writers of Traditional China: An Anthology of Poetry and Criticism (Stanford University Press, 2000)
- Ed., Partner to the Poor: A Paul Farmer Reader written by Paul Farmer (University of California Press, 2009)
- Ed., The Chinese Written Character as a Medium for Poetry: A Critical Edition written by Ernest Fenollosa and Ezra Pound (Fordham University Press, 2008)
- Ed., with Perry Meisel, Wade Baskin's translation of Ferdinand de Saussure's Course in General Linguistics (Columbia University Press, 2011)
- Ed., with Rivi Handler-Spitz and Pauline Chen Lee, A Book to Burn and A Book to Keep (Hidden): Selected Writings of Li Zhi (Columbia University Press, 2016)

== Family ==
Saussy is the son of Lola Haun Saussy and Tupper Saussy, an American musician and conspiracy theorist. He is married to Olga V. Solovieva, a Yale University Ph.D. (2006) and researcher at Nikolaus Copernicus University in Torun, Poland. He has two children from his first marriage, Liana and Caleb, and three from his second marriage.

== Honors ==
- President (2009–2011) of the American Comparative Literature Association.
- Fellow of the American Academy of Arts and Sciences (since 2009).
- Graduate President (2007–2011) of the Alpha of Connecticut Chapter of Phi Beta Kappa.
- Scaglione Prize for Comparative Studies from the Modern Language Association.
