= Perry Meisel =

Perry Meisel is an American writer and former Professor of English at New York University. He taught at New York University for over forty years prior to his retirement in 2016 and has written on literature, music, psychoanalysis, theory, and culture since the 1970s. His articles have appeared in The Village Voice, The New York Times Book Review, Partisan Review, October, The Nation, The Atlantic, and many other publications. His books include The Myth of Popular Culture from Dante to Dylan, The Literary Freud, The Cowboy and the Dandy, The Myth of the Modern, The Absent Father, and Thomas Hardy: The Return of the Repressed. He is co-editor, with Haun Saussy, of Ferdinand de Saussure's Course in General Linguistics, and co-editor, with Walter Kendrick, of Bloomsbury/Freud: The Letters of James and Alix Strachey, 1924–25. He is also editor of Freud: A Collection of Critical Essays. He received his B.A., M. Phil, and Ph.D. from Yale.

== Biography ==
Born in Shreveport, Louisiana in 1949, Meisel grew up in Dobbs Ferry, New York, attending public schools there before attending the Horace Mann School. He matriculated at Yale in the late 1960s, where he received his BA in English and History in 1970. He taught at Yale the following year as a Carnegie Fellow. He received his PhD at Yale in English in 1975, writing on Virginia Woolf under the direction of J. Hillis Miller. In graduate school, Meisel taught at Yale and Wesleyan; he also wrote on rock and jazz for Crawdaddy! and The Boston Phoenix. In 1972, he published his first book, a study of Thomas Hardy's fiction.

Meisel came to New York University in 1975 and was an important champion of New York's downtown scene as well as of the structuralist and post-structuralist theory of Roland Barthes, Michel Foucault, Jacques Derrida, Jacques Lacan, and Louis Althusser. In 1975, he also began writing for The Village Voice, covering rock and jazz for music editor Robert Christgau and a variety of topics for arts editor Richard Goldstein. In 1978, Meisel was a charter Fellow of the New York Institute for the Humanities, co-ordinating a reading group on theory whose members included Rosalind Krauss and Susan Sontag. In 1980, he published The Absent Father, a study of Virginia Woolf's aestheticism and, in 1981, edited a collection of essays on Freud as literature. That year, Meisel was awarded tenure at NYU. In 1985, he co-edited, with Walter Kendrick, Bloomsbury/Freud, the letters of Freud's English translators, James and Alix Strachey. In the 1980s, he also taught as a visiting professor at Columbia University. In 1987, he published The Myth of the Modern, and became full professor at NYU.

In 1987, Meisel also fell ill. A diagnosis eluded him until seven years later, when he was diagnosed as suffering from an intractable case of temporal lobe epilepsy, resulting in frequent partial seizures from abrupt changes in light and noise and from digital and other new technologies. His physicians included Oliver Sacks. Epilepsy and its complications forced Meisel to retreat from public activity. He took refuge in his teaching and benefited from a greater literary productivity, turning his attention more exclusively to literature, theory, and psychoanalysis. In 1984, he began writing for The New York Times Book Review. The Cowboy and the Dandy appeared in 1999, The Literary Freud in 2007. In 2010, The Myth of Popular Culture appeared as a Blackwell Manifesto. In 2011, Meisel co-edited, with Haun Saussy, Ferdinand de Saussure's Course in General Linguistics, restoring Wade Baskin's original translation and providing the first critical edition of Saussure's lectures to appear in English. He served as a contributing editor of American Imago from 2001 to 2011. He is a member of PEN, the Modern Language Association, and the American Association of University Professors. He is also a member of the Institute for the History of Psychiatry at Weill Cornell Medical College.

== Major works ==
Meisel's major works include The Myth of the Modern (1987), The Cowboy and the Dandy (1999), The Literary Freud (2007), and The Myth of Popular Culture (2010).

The Myth of the Modern is a deconstruction of the canonical British modernists. The Cowboy and the Dandy argues that rock and roll is the crossroads of Romanticism and African American culture. The Literary Freud shows how Freud's description of the mind succeeds by doubling it as an activity constantly seeking coherence.

The Myth of Popular Culture discusses the dialectic of "highbrow" and "lowbrow" in popular culture through an examination of literature, film, and popular music. With topics ranging from John Keats to John Ford, the book responds to, among many other things, Adorno's theory that popular culture is not dialectical by showing that it is.

== Works ==
- Criticism After Theory from Shakespeare to Virginia Woolf (New York and London: Routledge, 2022)
- Course in General Linguistics. Co-ed. with Haun Saussy. Trans. Wade Baskin. By Ferdinand de Saussure (Columbia 2011)
- The Myth of Popular Culture from Dante to Dylan (Blackwell 2010)
- The Literary Freud (Routledge 2007)
- The Cowboy and the Dandy: Crossing Over from Romanticism to Rock and Roll (Oxford 1999)
- The Myth of the Modern: A Study in British Literature and Criticism after 1850 (Yale 1987)
- Bloomsbury/Freud: The Letters of James and Alix Strachey, 1924–25, Co-ed with Walter Kendrick (Basic 1985)
- Freud: A Collection of Critical Essays. Ed. (Prentice-Hall 1981)
- The Absent Father: Virginia Woolf and Walter Pater (Yale 1980)
- Thomas Hardy: The Return of the Repressed (Yale 1972)
