= '78 Jumping Summer Carnival =

Live album by Pink Lady
- Released: September 5, 1978
- Recorded: July 23, 1978
- Venue: Korakuen Stadium
- Genres: J-pop; kayōkyoku; disco; teen pop
- Length: 53:43
- Languages: Japanese; English
- Label: Victor
- Producer: Hisahiko Iida

Pink Lady chronology
America! America! America! (1978)	'78 Jumping Summer Carnival (1978)	Hoshi kara Kita Futari (1978)

'78 Jumping Summer Carnival ('78ジャンピング・サマー・カーニバル, Nanajū-hachi Janpingu Samā Kānibaru) is the fifth live album by Japanese duo Pink Lady. Recorded live at Korakuen Stadium on July 23, 1978, the album was released on September 5, 1978. With over 100,000 fans in attendance, it was the largest concert headlined by the duo.

The album peaked at No. 12 on Oricon's weekly albums chart and sold over 48,000 copies.

== Track listing ==
Side A
No.	Title	Writer(s)	Length
1.	"Opening (オープニング, Ōpuningu): "Hurricane" (ハリケーン, Harikēn); "Soul Train" (ソウル・トレイン, Souru Torein); "I Love How You Love Me" (忘れたいのに, Wasuretai no Ni); "Lovin' You Is Killin' Me" (ラヴィン・ユー・イズ・キリン・ミー, Ravin Yū Izu Kirin Mī)"	Barry Mann; Kenneth Gamble; Larry Kolber; Leon Huff; Norman Bergen; Reid Whitelaw	9:13
2.	"Hello Mr. Monkey (ハロー・ミスター・モンキー（後楽園ライブ）, Harō Misutā Monkī)"	Ben Juris; Benny Lux	2:58
3.	"Eagle (イーグル, Īguru)"	Benny Andersson; Björn Ulvaeus	4:22
4.	"Take a Chance on Me (テイク・ア・チャンス・オン・ミー, Teiku a Chansu on Mī)"	Andersson; Ulvaeus	3:38
5.	"It Must Be Him (この恋に生きて, Konno Koi ni Ikite)" (Mie solo)	Gilbert Bécaud; Maurice Vidalin; Mack David	4:34
6.	"Chained to Your Love (チェインド・トゥ・ユア・ラブ, Cheindo tu Yua Rabu)" (Kei solo)	Whitelaw; Bergen	3:18

Side B
No.	Title	Writer(s)	Length
1.	"Medley (メドレー, Medorē): "Stayin' Alive" (スティンアライブ, Sutein Araibu); "How Deep Is Your Love" (愛はきらめきの中に, Ai wa Kirameki no Naka ni); "Night Fever" (恋のナイト・フィーバー, Koi no Naito Fībā)"	Barry Gibb; Robin Gibb; Maurice Gibb	7:28
2.	"Beatles Medley (ビートルズ・メドレー, Bītorusu Medorē): "Hey Jude" (ヘイ・ジュード, Hei Jūdo); "Get Back" (ゲット・バック, Getto Bakku); "Back in the U.S.S.R." (バック・イン・ザ・U.S.S.R., Bakku in za U.S.S.R.); "I Want to Hold Your Hand" (抱きしめたい, Dakishimetai); "Lady Madonna" (レディ・マドンナ, Redi Madonna); "Help!" (ヘルプ!, Herupu!); "Yesterday" (イエスタデイ, Iesutadei); "Yellow Submarine" (イエロー・サブマリン, Ierō Sabumarin); "Ob-La-Di, Ob-La-Da" (オブ・ラ・ディ、オブ・ラ・ダ, Obu Ra Di, Obu Ra Da); "Lucy in the Sky with Diamonds" (ルーシー・イン・ザ・スカイ・ウィズ・ダイアモンズ, Rūshī in za Sukai uizu Daiamonzu); "Michelle" (ミッシェル, Missheru); "With a Little Help from My Friends" (ウィズ・ア・リトル・ヘルプ・フロム・マイ・フレンズ, Uizu a Hitoru Herupu Furomu Mai Furenzu); "All My Loving" (オール・マイ・ラヴィング, Ōru Mai Ravingu); "Penny Lane" (ペニー・レイン, Penī Rein); "Hey Jude""	Lennon–McCartney	4:58
3.	"UFO"	Yū Aku; Shunichi Tokura	2:17
4.	"Wanted (Shimei Tehai) (ウォンテッド（指名手配）, Uonteddo (Shimei Tehai); "Wanted (Fugitive Warrant)")"	Aku; Tokura	1:44
5.	"Southpaw (サウスポー, Sausupō)"	Aku; Tokura	2:06
6.	"Monster (モンスター, Monsutā)"	Aku; Tokura	3:10
7.	"I Love How You Love Me ~ Ending (忘れたいのに ～ エンディング, Wasuretai no Ni ~ Endingu)"	Mann; Kolber	3:55

== Charts ==
Chart (1978)	Peak position
Japanese Oricon Albums Chart	12

== See also ==
- 1978 in Japanese music
