= The Neon Philharmonic (album) =

Studio album by The Neon Philharmonic
- Released: 1969
- Genre: Pop
- Length: 28:12
- Label: Warner Bros.

Professional ratings
Review scores
Source	Rating
Allmusic	2.5/5 stars

The Neon Philharmonic, subtitled Dedicated to the Baroness d'A, is the second album by The Neon Philharmonic, again consisting of songs written by Tupper Saussy and sung by Don Gant. "No One Is Going to Hurt You" was released as a single in July 1969, with "You Lied" on the B-side.

Each song has a brief parenthetical description of the intent of the song.

== Track listing ==
Side one

1. Are You Old Enough to Remember Dresden? (Questionnaire)
2. Forever Hold Your Peace (Burning Bridges)
3. You Lied (Going Away)
4. Harry (Letter to a Friend)

Side two

1. No One Is Going to Hurt You (A Promise)
2. Long John the Pirate (Allegory)
3. F. Scott Fitzgerald & William Shakespeare (You Can't Go Home Again)
4. The Mordor National Anthem (A National Anthem for Rent to Emerging Nations)

== Reissue ==
The album was reissued on the same disc as their first album, The Moth Confesses, in the box set Brilliant Colors: The Complete Warner Bros. Recordings in 2003.

== Personnel ==
- Don Gant (singer, producer)
- Tupper Saussy (conductor, piano, harpsichord, pirate voice, producer)
- Pierre Menard, Lillian, Brenton, George, Dick, Sadao, Harold, Marvin, Gary (Neon's Scrapers [i.e. string section])
- Chuck Watt and Walter (Neon's winds)
- Chip (guitar)
- Putt (electric bass)
- Jim (drums)
- Carole, Winnifred, Ricky, Delores, Hershel, Joe (chorus)
- Baroness d'A (condign patience and effort)
- Ronald Gant (engineer)
- Bob McCluskey (executive producer)
- Ed Thrasher (cover photography and art direction)

Recorded in Acuff-Rose's tiny studio in Nashville on Ampex by Wesley Rose.
