= Don Gant =

American singer, songwriter and record producer (1942–1987)

Donald Wayne Gant (October 24, 1942 – March 15, 1987) was an American singer, songwriter and record producer.

With Tupper Saussy, in the late 1960s he formed The Neon Philharmonic. Singing vocals, with Saussy on the keyboards, they recorded five singles and two albums for Warner Bros. Records between 1969 and 1971. The albums were The Moth Confesses (1969), containing the duo's biggest hit "Morning Girl" (peaked at #17 on 7–14 June 1969), and the eponymous The Neon Philharmonic (1969).

In Nashville, Tennessee he worked at Acuff-Rose Music as a songwriter and as an executive. He wrote a number of songs himself and co-wrote with Joe Melson. Songwriter Mickey Newbury said of Gant that there are "A lot of songwriters you'd never have heard of if it wasn't for Don Gant."

Gant produced records for singers Lefty Frizzell, Eddy Raven, Roy Orbison when he was with MGM Records and eventually joined ABC Records, where produced 4 key albums for Jimmy Buffett, which span his "Key West" phase while Buffett was building his career and persona.

Don Gant died unexpectedly at the age of 44 in Nashville of complications following a serious boating accident in Florida.
