= Morning Girl =

1969 song by The Neon Philharmonic

Single by The Neon Philharmonic

from the album The Moth Confesses
- B-side: "Brilliant Colors"
- Released: March 1969
- Genre: Orchestral pop; sunshine pop; baroque pop
- Length: 2:09
- Label: Warner Bros.
- Songwriter: Tupper Saussy
- Producers: Tupper Saussy, Don Gant, and Bob McCluskey

The Neon Philharmonic singles chronology
"Morning Girl" (1969)	"Heighdy-Ho Princess" (1970)

"Morning Girl" is a 1969 song by The Neon Philharmonic. It was a hit in Canada and the United States. The recording featured a chamber-sized orchestra of Nashville Symphony Orchestra musicians, and the project was headed by composer Tupper Saussy and vocalist Don Gant.

The song reached number 17 on the US Billboard Hot 100 the weeks of June 7 and 14, 1969. It peaked at number 15 on the Cash Box Top 100. It was a bigger hit in Canada, where it hit number 6 on the RPM 100, and number 2 on RPM's Adult Contemporary chart.

== Charts ==
Chart (1969)	Peak position
Canada RPM 100	6
Canada RPM Adult Contemporary	2
US Billboard Hot 100	17
US Billboard Easy Listening	39
US Cash Box Top 100	15

== Shaun Cassidy cover ==
"Morning Girl"

Single by Shaun Cassidy

from the album Shaun Cassidy
- B-side: "I Wanna Be with You"
- Released: 1976
- Genre: Pop
- Label: Warner Bros.
- Songwriter: Tupper Saussy
- Producer: Michael Lloyd

Shaun Cassidy singles chronology
"Morning Girl" (1976)	"Hey There Lonely Girl" (1976)

In 1976, Shaun Cassidy covered "Morning Girl." It was his first single, and the track was included on his debut album, Shaun Cassidy. It saw release in Germany, reaching number 40.

== Other cover versions ==
The Lettermen, in 1971. Their version reached number 34 on the U.S. Adult Contemporary chart.

In 1969, Brazilian singer Ronnie Von released a Portuguese rendition on his album A Misteriosa Luta do Reino de Parassempre Contra o Império de Nuncamais.

Pink Lady performed a Japanese-language take on the song for their 1978 live album America! America! America!.

In 2017, Filipino singer and actor, Daniel Padilla released his version on Star Records.
