= Vicki Sue Robinson =

American singer (1954–2000)

Background information
- Born: May 31, 1954; Harlem, New York, U.S.
- Died: April 27, 2000 (aged 45) Wilton, Connecticut, U.S.
- Genres: Disco; pop; R&B
- Occupations: Singer; back-up vocalist; session musician
- Years active: 1970–2000
- Labels: RSO; RCA; Prelude; Rhino; Ariola

Vicki Sue Robinson (May 31, 1954 – April 27, 2000) was an American singer closely associated with the disco era of late 1970s pop music; she is most famous for her 1976 hit, "Turn the Beat Around".

== Early life ==
Born in Harlem, New York, to African American Shakespearean actor Bill Robinson and his European American wife Marianne (who sometimes went by the name Jolly Robinson), a folk singer who sang with Pete Seeger and others. Until she was about 10 she lived in Philadelphia and then returned to New York City with her family.

After attending the High School of Music & Art in New York City, Robinson enrolled at Sarah Lawrence College. However, she soon realized that she wanted to pursue a career in music, so she dropped out to pursue her dreams.

== Career ==
She gave her first public performance in 1960 at the age of six, when she accompanied her mother on stage at the Philadelphia Folk Festival. At the age of 16, while a student at the New Lincoln School in Manhattan, New York, Robinson made her professional performing debut when she joined the Broadway cast of the musical Hair. She remained with Hair for six weeks before moving to a new Broadway production, Soon, whose cast included Peter Allen, Barry Bostwick, Nell Carter, and Richard Gere.

After the show's short run, Robinson appeared in the Off-Broadway play Long Time Coming, Long Time Gone, in which she and Richard Gere played Mimi and Richard Fariña. New York magazine opined that Robinson "sings with gentle power, accompanying herself on guitar and dulcimer, and moves with astounding confidence."

Robinson also had bit parts in the films Going Home (1971) and To Find A Man (1972). After a sojourn in Japan, she returned to Broadway in 1973, joining the cast of Jesus Christ Superstar. She made her recording debut as one of several Hair veterans invited to sing background on Todd Rundgren's Something/Anything? album released in 1972. In 1973 she spent time in Japan with Itsuro Shimoda, with whom she did session work on his album Love Songs and Lamentations, and toured nationally. In 2011, Gold Legion.com digitally remastered and reissued Robinson's four albums for RCA Records on CD, along with bonus tracks and liner notes.

=== "Turn the Beat Around" ===
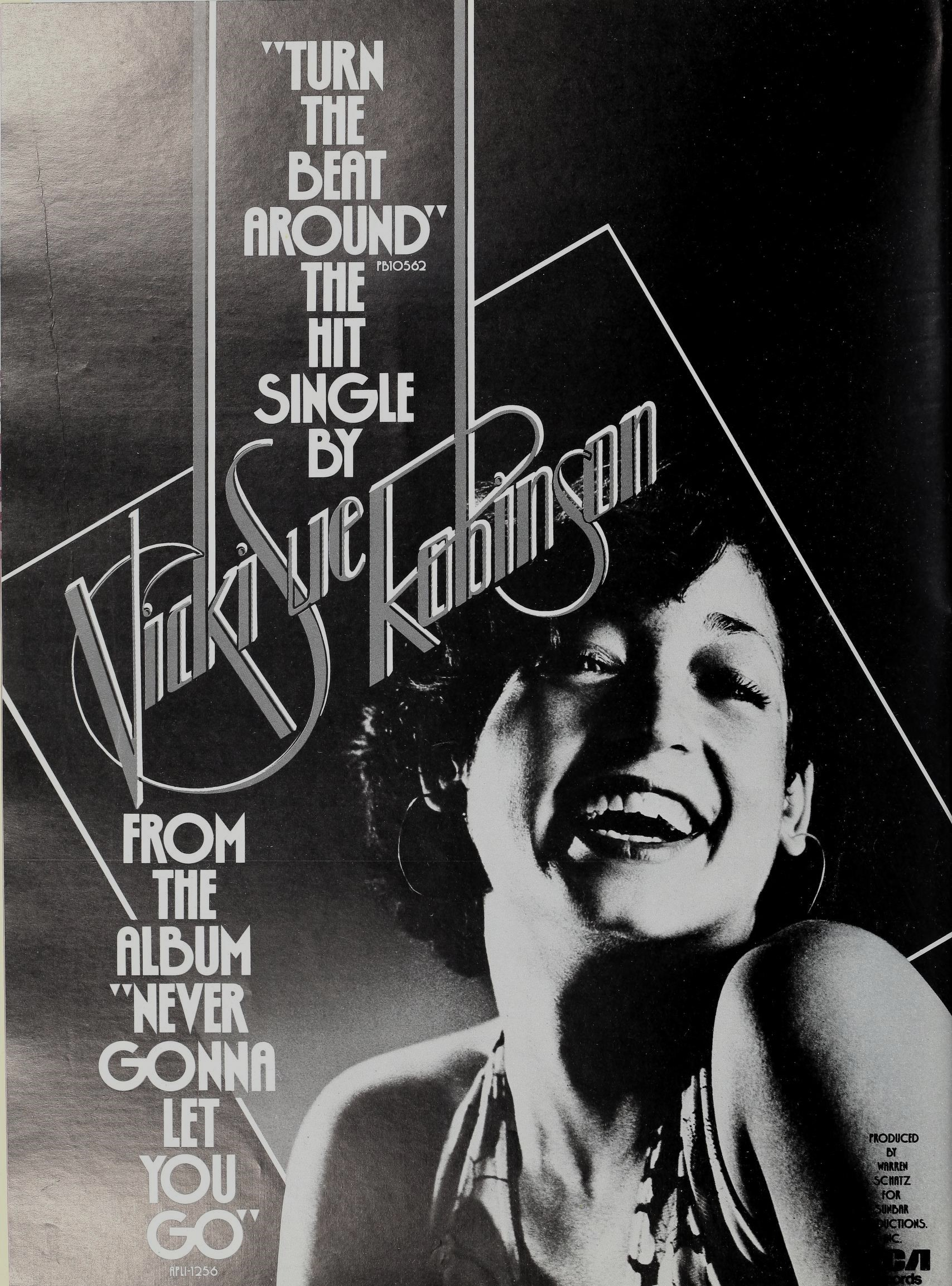
Cashbox advertisement, May 15, 1976

In 1975, Robinson was providing vocals at a New York recording session for the album Many Sunny Places by Scott Fagan, a singer with whom she had performed in Greenwich Village clubs. Warren Schatz, a producer/engineer with RCA Records, was struck by Robinson's voice and saw her potential as a disco-oriented artist. Schatz invited Robinson to cut some demos including a remake of the Foundations' "Baby Now That I've Found You", which became Robinson's first solo release. Despite that track's failure, RCA green-lit Schatz producing Robinson's debut album Never Gonna Let You Go. The title cut, a Schatz original, became a No. 10 disco hit, but another album track, "Turn the Beat Around", which she reportedly had done in one take, began to build "buzz" and was expediently released as a single, topping the disco charts on March 20, 1976. It reached the U.S. top 10 in August, spending around six months overall on the Billboard Hot 100 and propelling the Never Gonna Let You Go to the 49th place on the pop chart and #51 on the black chart. "Turn the Beat Around" charted internationally, reaching No. 14 in Canada, No. 11 in the Netherlands, and No. 12 in South Africa. The track earned Robinson a nomination for a Grammy Award for Best Female Pop Vocal Performance.

In 1976, Robinson toured across the United States promoting her hit tune, "Turn the Beat Around". She performed on major TV shows including The Midnight Special, Don Kirshner's Rock Concert, The Merv Griffin Show, Mike Douglas, American Bandstand, and Soul Train. She also performed at the Boarding House in San Francisco, The Starwood in Los Angeles, The Bottom Line, Felt Forum, Carnegie Hall in New York, and other top venues. The original touring band consisted of Dan Pickering on trumpet and flute, Bill Cerulli on drums, Wendy Simmons on bass guitar, Nacho Mena on percussion, Vernie "Butch" Taylor on guitar, and George Pavlis on keyboards. George Pavlis later would be replaced by Joey Melotti on keyboards. The touring band members recorded four tracks on Robinson's second album, Vicki Sue Robinson.

=== Self-titled album ===
Again with Schatz producing, Robinson recorded Vicki Sue Robinson for release in the fall of 1976. Although its lead single, a cover of Bobby Womack's "Daylight", was only a minor hit (#61), the album reached #39 on the black chart and #45 on the pop chart. Robinson's next Hot 100 appearance was in August 1977, with her version of David Gates' "Hold Tight", which peaked at #67 (and #2 on the disco chart). Its parent album, Half and Half, again produced by Schatz, was not released until 1978 and peaked at #110. In 1979, Robinson contributed the track "Easy to Be Hard" to the Schatz production Disco Spectacular –an album of dance versions of songs from the musical Hair, inspired by the release of the film version–and recorded what would prove to be her final album, Movin' On. Although Schatz was credited as the album's executive producer, that job was done by Evelyn King's producer, T. Life. Movin' On's tracks were ignored in the dance clubs, but Robinson scored a 1979 club hit with "Nighttime Fantasy", a track written and produced by Norman Bergen and Reid Whitelaw, recorded for the film Nocturna: Granddaughter of Dracula. Also in 1979, Robinson appeared in a film made by the same production company as Nocturna: Granddaughter of Dracula titled Gangsters (now called Hoodlums), which also featured T. Life and Cissy Houston, and the first credited screen role for Jean Smart.

=== The 1980s ===
In 1980 Robinson moved from RCA to Ariola Records, where Warren Schatz had assumed the position of COO. However, Schatz did not continue as Robinson's producer at Ariola. Respecting her wishes to move in a new musical direction, he had her record at Muscle Shoals Sound Studio with Clayton Ivey and Terry Woodford, producing the single "Nothin' But a Heartache". The recording of the Michael McDonald composition was Robinson's sole Ariola release. She resumed recording dance music with Schatz with releases on a number of labels: Prelude Records, Promise Records, Perfect Records, and Profile Records. Her dance version of "To Sir with Love", which became a surprise top ten hit in Australia in 1984, came out on Profile. Her next release, a remake of "Everlasting Love" in 1984, was her last recording for almost fifteen years, apart from the track "Grab Them Cakes", a duet with professional wrestler Junkyard Dog featured on The Wrestling Album (1985). The "Grab Them Cakes" was released as a single. The single was so popular, it earned the wrestler a coveted spot on American Bandstand, the only performance by a wrestler at the time. Robinson shared the stage, and had the performance of Cyndi Lauper, as her alter ego "Mona Flambe", as part of the wrestler's backup band.

Robinson sang background on Irene Cara's hit single "Fame" in 1980, and as the decade progressed she returned to session work, backing Michael Bolton and Cher. She also established herself as a career jingle singer for products including Wrigley's Doublemint chewing gum, Maybelline cosmetics, Downy fabric softener, Hanes underwear, New York Bell, and Folgers coffee. From 1987 to 1988, Robinson provided the singing voice for the characters Rapture and Minx in the animated TV series Jem.

=== Later career ===
Robinson regained publicity from Gloria Estefan's 1994 version of "Turn the Beat Around". The success of the Estefan single inspired Robinson to re-record the song for the B-side of her 1995 single, "For Real". That led to TV appearances on a number of talk shows as well as recording, film, and stage projects. She provided backing vocals on RuPaul's 1996 album Foxy Lady, where the two of them also recorded a duet. Then, in 1997, she recorded the song "House of Joy" for DJ/producer Junior Vasquez, which became Robinson's first and only hit single in the United Kingdom. She then recorded the song "My Stomp, My Beat" for the film Chasing Amy. In October 1997, Robinson played herself on Comedy Central's mock TV documentary Unauthorized Biography: Milo, Death of a Supermodel. A resurgence of interest in disco music in the mid-1990s led Robinson and fellow disco veterans KC and the Sunshine Band, Thelma Houston, Gloria Gaynor, and the Village People to embark on a well-received world tour.

After returning to the U.S. in 1999, Robinson returned to her roots in theatre by performing in an Off-Broadway musical titled Vicki: Behind The Beat which was semi-autobiographical in nature, and featured her hit songs and her best-known jingles. The play was a continuation of her popular cabaret show. In June of that year, she provided the track "Pokémon (Dance Mix)" from the Pokémon 2.B.A. Master soundtrack for the English dub of the Pokémon anime. In September, Robinson released her final single, "Move On", which reached #18 on Billboard's Dance Chart. Also in September, she was forced to withdraw from her Off-Broadway show due to poor health. However during her illness, Robinson undertook the role of a fairy godmother in the independent film Red Lipstick, which was released on April 16, 2000.

== Death ==
On April 27, 2000, 11 days after the release of Red Lipstick, Robinson died of cancer at her home in Wilton, Connecticut.

== Discography ==
=== Albums ===
Year	Album	Peak chart positions		
Year	Album	US R&B	US Pop	AUS
1976	Never Gonna Let You Go	51	49	78
1976	Vicki Sue Robinson	39	45	–
1978	Half & Half	56	110	–
1979	Movin' On	–	–	–
"–" denotes releases that did not have data.

=== Singles ===
Year	Single	Peak chart positions										
Year	Single	US Pop	US R&B	US Adult Con.	US Dance	AUS	UK	NLD	BEL	FRA	CAN	CAN Dance
1975	"Baby Now That I Found You"	–	–	–	–	–	–	–	–	–	–	–
1976	"Turn the Beat Around"	10	73	43	1	28	52 (Note: Chart position is from the official UK "Breakers List".)	11	17	44	14	–
1976	"Common Thief"	–	–	–	8	–	–	–	–	–	–	–
1976	"Daylight"	63	91	–	9	–	–	–	–	–	–	11
1977	"Should I Stay" / "I Won't Let You Go"	104	–	–	–	–	–	–	–	–	–	11
1977	"Hold Tight"	67	91	–	2	–	–	–	–	–	–	–
1978	"Trust in Me"	110	–	–	16	–	–	–	–	–	–	–
1978	"Jealousy"	–	–	–	–	–	–	–	–	–	–	–
1978	"Freeway Song"	–	–	–	–	–	–	–	–	–	–	–
1979	"Nighttime Fantasy"	102	–	–	21	–	–	–	–	–	–	–
1980	"Nothin' but a Heartache"	–	–	–	–	–	–	–	–	–	–	–
1981	"Hot Summer Night"	–	–	–	24	–	–	–	–	–	–	–
1982	"Give My Love Back"	–	–	–	–	–	–	–	–	–	–	–
1983	"Summertime Fun"	–	–	–	–	–	–	–	–	–	–	–
1984	"To Sir with Love"	–	–	–	28	7	–	–	–	–	–	–
1984	"Everlasting Love"	–	–	–	37	83	–	–	–	–	–	–
1985	"Grab Them Cakes" (duet with Junkyard Dog)	–	–	–	–	–	–	–	–	–	–	–
1995	"For Real"	–	–	–	–	–	–	–	–	–	–	–
1997	"House of Joy"	–	–	–	–	–	48	–	–	–	–	–
1999	"Move On"	–	–	–	18	–	–	–	–	–	–	–
1999	"Pokémon (Dance Mix)"	90	-	-	-	-	-	-	-	-	-	-
"–" denotes releases that did not have data.

== Filmography ==
- Going Home – 1971
- To Find a Man – 1972
- Hoodlums – 1980
- Red Lipstick – 2000

== Theatre ==
- Hair – 1970
- Soon – 1971
- Long Time Coming, Long Time Gone – 1971
- Voices From The Third World – 1972
- Jesus Christ Superstar – 1973
- Vicki Sue Robinson: Behind The Beat – 1999

== See also ==
- List of Billboard number-one dance club songs
- List of artists who reached number one on the U.S. Dance Club Songs chart
