= Room Service (Shaun Cassidy album) =

Studio album by Shaun Cassidy
- Released: July 1, 1979
- Recorded: 1979
- Genre: Pop
- Label: Warner Bros.
- Producer: Michael Lloyd

Shaun Cassidy chronology
That's Rock 'N' Roll Live (1979)	Room Service (1979)	Wasp (1980)

Room Service is Shaun Cassidy's fourth studio album.

Cassidy and songwriter-producer Michael Lloyd recruited 13 different musicians for the production of Room Service. The credits include four different guitarists and seven different keyboardists.

The album's only single, "You're Usin' Me," failed to chart.

== Track listing ==
Appetizers
No.	Title	Writer(s)	Length
1.	"Fallin' Into You"	Shaun Cassidy, David Jolliffe	4:41
2.	"Time for a Change"	Cassidy	3:18
3.	"Only Because of Love"	Michael Lloyd	3:39
4.	"Are You Afraid of Me?"	Cassidy	3:53

Entrees
No.	Title	Writer(s)	Length
5.	"Break for the Street"	Cassidy	4:28
6.	"Heaven in Your Eyes"	Howard Greenfield, Lloyd	2:56
7.	"You're Usin' Me"	Lloyd	3:34
8.	"The Letter"	Wayne Carson	3:08
9.	"You Still Surprise Me"	Cassidy, Gruska	3:39
