= Wasp (album) =

Studio album by Shaun Cassidy
- Released: September 1, 1980
- Recorded: Late 1979-early 1980
- Genre: New wave
- Label: Warner Bros.
- Producer: Todd Rundgren

Shaun Cassidy chronology
Room Service (1979)	Wasp (1980)	Greatest Hits (1992)

Wasp is the fifth and final studio album by teen idol Shaun Cassidy, released in 1980. In an attempt to salvage a sinking pop career, Cassidy recruited Todd Rundgren to help "reinvent" his music career. Members of Rundgren's group Utopia also played on the record, and the work had a decidedly "new wave" feel.

The majority of tracks featured on Wasp were cover songs. The album featured a version of David Bowie's song, "Rebel Rebel", in which Cassidy included a passage from The Crystals' "He's a Rebel." Other covers included The Who's "So Sad About Us", Ian Hunter's "Once Bitten, Twice Shy", Talking Heads' "The Book I Read", The Animals' 1965 hit "It's My Life", and The Four Tops' 1966 hit "Shake Me, Wake Me". All of the other songs were written by Rundgren and various members of his band. Unlike his previous four albums where he wrote at least one song, Cassidy was given a co-writing credit on "Cool Fire."

The reinvention of teenybopper Cassidy as an edgy new wave artist was not enough to capture the attention of audiences. The album was Cassidy's second album not to chart on the Billboard 200, effectively ending his pop music career. Cassidy would score a final hit in Europe in 1989 with the standalone single "Memory Girl."

The album was released on CD in 2012 by Curb Records.

== Track listing ==
1. "Rebel, Rebel" (David Bowie)
2. "Cool Fire" (John Wilcox, Roger Powell, Shaun Cassidy, Todd Rundgren)
3. "The Book I Read" (David Byrne)
4. "Pretending" (Rundgren)
5. "Shake Me, Wake Me" (Holland–Dozier–Holland)
6. "It's My Life" (Roger Atkins, Carl D'Errico)
7. "So Sad About Us" (Pete Townshend)
8. "Wasp" (Rundgren)
9. "Selfless Love" (Rundgren)
10. "Once Bitten, Twice Shy" (Ian Hunter)

== Personnel ==
- Shaun Cassidy - vocals
- Todd Rundgren - guitar, bass, drums, saxophone
- Roger Powell - keyboards, synthesizer, backing vocals
- John "Willie" Wilcox - drums, backing vocals
- Kasim Sulton - bass on "Selfless Love"
