= The Neon Philharmonic =

American band

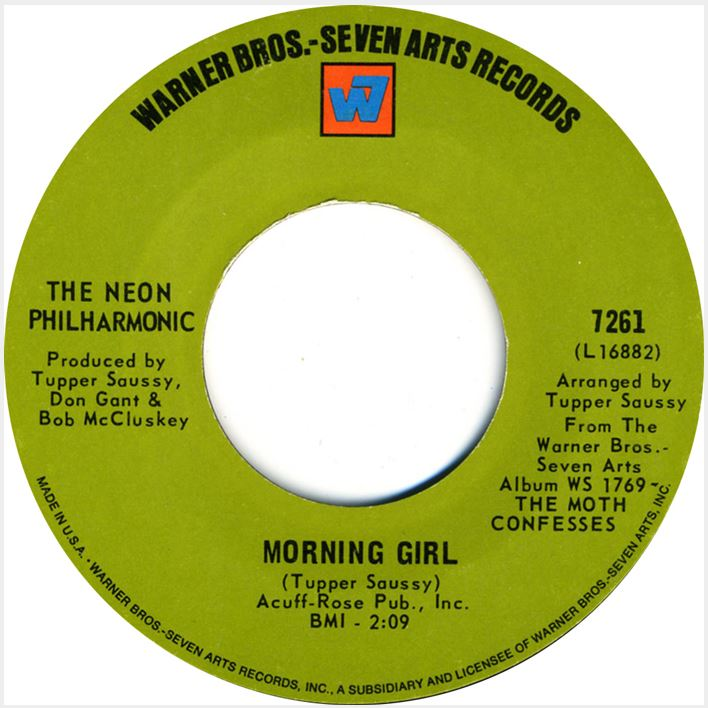
- The 45 of the hit song, "Morning Girl" by Neon Philharmonic from 1969.

Background information
- Origin: United States
- Genres: Psychedelic pop
- Years active: 1967–1975
- Labels: Warner Bros. TRX Records; MCA Records; London Records; Sundazed; Rhino Records
- Past members: Kenneth A. Buttrey; Jerry Carrigan; Chip Young; Don Gant; Dennis Good; Rufus Long; Pierre Menard; Norbert Putnam; Tupper Saussy; Don Sheffield; Chuck Wyatt

The Neon Philharmonic (formed 1967) was an American psychedelic pop band led by songwriter and conductor Tupper Saussy and singer Don Gant, produced by Saussy, Gant, and Bob McCluskey, and engineered by Gant's brother Ronald. Although the first album stated "Borges Forever!", the group's concertmaster is in fact named Pierre Menard, and it is not a reference to the Jorge Luis Borges story Pierre Menard, Author of the Quixote; Saussy was not conscious of the connection.

They released their two albums (The Moth Confesses and the eponymous The Neon Philharmonic) in 1969, and scored a Top 20 hit on the Billboard Hot 100 chart that year when "Morning Girl" (featuring the Nashville Symphony Orchestra,) hit number 17 on Billboard and number 15 on the Cash Box chart. The band hit the chart again with "Heighdy-Ho Princess" in 1970, and followed with several non-album singles (see the discography below). The bulk of the group's output was released by Warner Bros./Seven Arts Records. In 1972, they moved to TRX Records and produced another single, "Annie Poor" / "Love Will Find a Way", but disbanded in 1975.

The Neon Philharmonic name was sold to producer David Kastle, who put out additional singles released by MCA Records and London Records. At least one Saussy song, "Making Out the Best I Can", was recorded by this group and engineered by Ronald Gant. Along with its flipside recording, "So Glad You're a Woman", written by Ray Williams and Ron Demmans (MCA-40158 (MC 4810), 1975), the instrumentation was limited to synthesizers, guitar and drums. These later singles have no other connection to the original group.

American pop star Shaun Cassidy did a cover version of "Morning Girl, Later" (simply titled "Morning Girl") in 1976, which did not chart in the US, but did well in The Netherlands, Belgium and Germany. The song was also covered by The Lettermen.

The group is not to be confused with the German group The Neon Philharmonic Orchestra, which arranged many classical pieces in medleys in a similar style in the 1980s and 1990s, and covered Walter Murphy's "A Fifth of Beethoven".

== Discography ==
=== Albums ===
- The Moth Confesses WS-1769 (January 1969)
- The Neon Philharmonic WS-1804 (September 1969)
- Brilliant Colors: The Complete Warner Bros. Recordings (2003)

=== Singles ===
==== Warner Bros. ====
- "Morning Girl" / "Brilliant Colors" (Mono single versions) No. 7621 (January 1969) US Billboard Hot 100 No. 17, No. 2 Canada
- "No One Is Going to Hurt You" / "You Lied" (Mono single versions) No. 7311 (July 1969) US Billboard Bubbling Under No. 120
- "Clouds" / "Snow" No. 7355 (November 1969)
- "Heighdy-Ho Princess" / "Don't Know My Way Around My Soul" No. 7380 (March 1970)
- "Flowers for Your Pillow" / "To Be Continued" No. 7419 (July 1970)
- "Something to Believe In" / "A Little Love" No. 7457 (January 1971)
- "Got a Feelin' in My Bones" / "Keep the Faith in Me" No. 7497 (May 1971)

Three additional songs, "Better Times," "Jody," and "Letters Crossing", were recorded around the fall of 1970 and remained unreleased until the 2003 collection.

==== TRX ====
- "Annie Poor" / "Love Will Find a Way" (TRX T-5039, 1972)

==== MCA ====
- "So Glad You're a Woman" / "Making Out the Best I Can" (MCA-40158 (MC 4810), 1975)

==== London ====
- "Long Distance Love Affair" / "Making Out The Best I Can" (L.2577)
- "So Glad You're A Woman" / "Making Out The Best I Can" (L.2584) (No. 11 CAN)
- "Bright Lights, Hard Nights" / "She Looked Like A Woman To Me" (L.2598)
- "Lovin' You" / "Don't Look Back" (L.2608)
- "Twice As Strong" / "Don't Look Back" (L.2636)
