= Shaun Cassidy (album) =

Studio album by Shaun Cassidy
- Released: 1976 (Europe, Australia); June 1, 1977 (U.S.)
- Recorded: 1976
- Genre: Pop
- Length: 29:16
- Label: Warner
- Producer: Michael Lloyd

Shaun Cassidy chronology
Shaun Cassidy (1976)	Born Late (1977)

Shaun Cassidy is the debut solo album by American singer Shaun Cassidy. It was first released in 1976 in Europe and Australia, where he had top-ten hits with "Morning Girl" and "That's Rock 'n' Roll". It was not until the release of a cover version of The Crystals' song, "Da Doo Ron Ron", that Cassidy's international success carried over into the United States. The single became a number-one Billboard Hot 100 hit for Cassidy and launched his career as a pop musician and teen idol in the U.S.

"That's Rock 'n' Roll" was written by Eric Carmen. It was the follow-up single to "Da Doo Ron Ron" in the U.S. and peaked at number three.

== Track listing ==
1. "Da Doo Ron Ron" (Phil Spector, Jeff Barry, Ellie Greenwich)
2. "Morning Girl" (Tupper Saussy)
3. "I Wanna Be with You" (Michael Lloyd)
4. "It's Too Late" (Bobby Goldsboro)
5. "Hey There Lonely Girl" (Earl Shuman, Leon Carr)
6. "That's Rock 'n' Roll" (Eric Carmen)
7. "Holiday" (Shaun Cassidy)
8. "Take Good Care of My Baby" (Gerry Goffin, Carole King)
9. "Amblin'" (Lloyd)
10. "Be My Baby" (Spector, Barry, Greenwich)

== Personnel ==
- Shaun Cassidy - vocals, keyboards
- Jay Graydon, Mitch Holder, Michael Lloyd - guitar
- Dee Murray, Mike Porcaro - bass
- Greg Mathieson, Jay Gruska - keyboards
- Carlos Vega, Rick Shlosser - drums
- Alan Estes - percussion
- John D'Andrea - saxophone, brass arrangement
- John Rosenberg - director of horns
- Sid Sharp - director of strings
- Gene Morford, Jimmy Haas, Jon Joyce, Michael Lloyd, Michelle Gruska, Ron Hicklin, Tom Bahler - background vocals
- Humberto Gatica - engineer

== Charts ==
=== Weekly charts ===
Chart (1977)	Peak position
Australian Albums (Kent Music Report)|	16
Canada Top Albums/CDs (RPM)	2
US Billboard 200	3

=== Year-end charts ===
Chart (1977)	Position
US Billboard 200	73
Chart (1978)	Position
US Billboard 200	52

== Certifications ==
Region	Certification	Certified units/sales
Australia (ARIA)	Gold	20,000^{^}
Canada (Music Canada)	2× Platinum	200,000^{^}
United States (RIAA)	Platinum	1,000,000^{^}
^{^} Shipments figures based on certification alone.
