= Tupper Saussy =

American musician and writer (1936–2007)

Frederick Tupper Saussy III (July 3, 1936 – March 16, 2007) was an American composer, musician, author, artist, tax protester and conspiracy theorist. He was a self-styled theologian, restaurant owner, ghostwriter of James Earl Ray's purported autobiography, King assassination conspiracy theorist, anti-government pamphleteer, and radical opponent of the federal government’s taxation and monetary authority.

He was born in Statesboro, Georgia; grew up in Tampa, Florida; and graduated from the University of the South at Sewanee, Tennessee, in 1958. His jazz combo there put out a university-subsidized album, Jazz at Sewanee, which included several original compositions. Thereafter Saussy taught English at Montgomery Bell Academy in Nashville, Tennessee, co-founded an advertising agency, McDonald and Saussy, and kept his musical career alive with recording dates and club sessions.

With the Nashville Symphony, he composed a work called The Beast with Five Heads (1965/66), based on "The Bremen Town Musicians", designed to replace Peter and the Wolf as a work to teach schoolchildren about the instruments of the orchestra, which continued to be used for the next fifteen years. For its 1968/69 season, the Nashville Symphony commissioned him to write a piano concerto for Bill Pursell; it was performed by the Symphony on January 14, 1969, with Thor Johnson conducting.

Saussy's activities as tax protester led him to be sentenced to prison and to be a fugitive from the law between 1987 and 1997. After his arrest, he served 14 months and was released in 1999.

== Popular music ==
Tupper Saussy was perhaps best known as the songwriter and keyboardist for the psychedelic pop band The Neon Philharmonic, whose vocalist was Don Gant. The Neon Philharmonic's single "Morning Girl" rose to Top Twenty status and was nominated for two Grammy awards in 1969. Earlier in Saussy's career, Monument Records had released several albums of his jazz compositions: Discover Tupper Saussy, Said I to Shostakovitch, and The Swingers' Guide to Mary Poppins (this last featuring songs from the namesake Disney movie). In the 1960s and 1970s, he composed works for the Nashville Symphony Orchestra and the Chattanooga Symphony. Saussy also composed two pop songs for The Wayward Bus, "The Prophet: Predictions by David Hoy" and "Love Hum". He also worked with Chet Atkins and Ray Stevens, and wrote arrangements for Mickey Newbury's Harlequin Melodies, as well as arrangements for Boudleaux Bryant, Bobby Bare, and Roy Orbison. The Neon Philharmonic's two albums, The Moth Confesses and The Neon Philharmonic were released by Warner Brothers in 1969. The group disbanded in 1972, but producer David Kastle bought the name and used it on recordings until 1975, even recording one of Saussy's songs, "Making Out the Best I Can".

== Painting ==
Saussy was the great-nephew of the Savannah painter Hattie Saussy. His first exhibition of watercolors was given in 1972 at Cheekwood in Nashville and his works can be found in the permanent collection of the Tennessee State Museum.

== Theater ==
In 1972, he published the play, To Watch a Beautiful Sunrise, through Samuel French Inc., a comedy concerning a radical anarchist with the House of the Rising Sons who is assigned to kill his own stepfather. Saussy first acted by replacing an actor in a regional production of Cactus Flower at The Circle Theater in Nashville after the original actor got pneumonia. A friend was playing Stephanie and recommended him for the role.

== Politics ==
Saussy published a book on what he called "the Vatican Jesuit Global Conspiracy" in which he claims that "the American Revolution and its resulting constitutional republic have been single-handedly designed and supervised by a Jesuit named Lorenzo Ricci—this country's true founding father". Between 1980 and 1987, Saussy edited The Main Street Journal, advising and reporting on political action aimed at restoring the gold and silver monetary system in the U.S. and arguing against federal taxes. Convicted on federal income tax charges in Chattanooga in 1985 and unsuccessful in his appeals, Saussy became a fugitive in 1987 rather than begin serving a one-year sentence at the federal prison in Atlanta.

Later, he befriended James Earl Ray, who had confessed to the assassination of Martin Luther King Jr. Ray had read of Saussy's defense in Tennessee newspapers and inquired by postcard if Saussy would be interested in helping him write and publish his autobiography. This resulted in the publication in 1987 of Tennessee Waltz: The Making of An American Political Prisoner. After its publication in 1987, Saussy was sued by Ray, who disavowed parts of their book.

== Legal problems ==
In the early 1980s, the federal government had begun cracking down on outspoken tax protesters, whose numbers were then estimated by the Internal Revenue Service at 40,000 or more. In 1985 Saussy was found guilty of willfully failing to file a tax return for the year 1977, and sentenced to serve one year in Atlanta Federal Prison Camp. He filed a "Fifth Amendment return," a discredited tax dodge that was popular with tax protesters in the 1970s and early 1980s. He also issued what he called PMOC, or "Public Money Office Certificates," and used them instead of money to pay for some services while living in Sewanee.) Saussy fled in 1987 rather than begin serving a sentence at the federal prison in Atlanta. US marshals pursued him until his arrest in November 1997 outside of his home in Venice Beach, California.

Saussy's appeal was denied by the Supreme Court. Saussy eventually served a 14-month sentence at Taft Correctional Institution in Taft, California. Saussy was given the job of chapel music director and piano instructor to prisoners. Saussy was released from prison on May 12, 1999.

== Later years ==
During his fugitive years, Saussy pursued his suspicions about the religious element in the origins of American government. In prison, he collated his research and prepared a final manuscript, which was published in 1999 by Osprey under the title Rulers of Evil: Useful Knowledge about Governing Bodies.

Saussy also expanded on his book's historical speculation later in alleging conspiracies about 9/11 being orchestrated by Dick Cheney and the Pope, whom Saussy calls "the undesignated de facto Chairman of the United States corporation". As Saussy writes: "9/11 could only have been a ruse created by the American Presidency to furnish a pretext for restricting the rights and property of Americans in order to redistribute American funds and forces to the middle east and soon elsewhere, pursuant to the Papacy's design".

Saussy's Warner Brothers albums were reissued in 2004 under the Rhino Handmade label. In April 2006, Tupper Saussy resumed his career as composer, pianist, and performing musician with the Nashville debut of The Chocolate Orchid Piano Bar, an album of new and vintage songs. His first new musical release in 37 years, the CD was recorded in Nashville and produced by Warren Pash.

Saussy was first married to Lola Haun (1940–1995), a Nashville socialite, whom he met during his tenure as a teacher at Montgomery Bell Academy. Before their divorce in 1972, they had a son, Caleb Powell Haun Saussy—whose professional name is Haun Saussy—and a daughter, Melinda Cavanaugh Saussy. With his second wife, Frederique Louise Blanco, Saussy had two more sons: Pierre Philippe Saussy and Laurent Amaury Saussy. He also had a stepdaughter, Alexia Camille Vallord.

Tupper Saussy died on March 16, 2007, at his home in Nashville of a heart attack, two days before the release of The Chocolate Orchid Piano Bar on CD. He was 70 years old.

== Publications ==
Books

- The Miracle on Main Street: Saving Yourself and America from Financial Ruin. Sewanee, Tenn.: Spencer Judd (1980).
- Rulers of Evil: Useful Knowledge about Governing Bodies. Reno, Nevada: Ospray Bookmakers (1999).

Book contributions

- Foreword to A Caveat Against Injustice, or An Inquiry into the Evils of a Fluctuating Medium of Exchange, by Roger Sherman [1752].

== See also ==
- Tax protester history in the United States
