= Born Late =

Studio album by Shaun Cassidy
- Released: October 1, 1977
- Recorded: 1977
- Genre: Pop
- Length: 31:59
- Label: Curb/Warner Bros.
- Producer: Michael Lloyd

Shaun Cassidy chronology
Shaun Cassidy (1977)	Born Late (1977)	Under Wraps (1978)

Professional ratings
Review scores
Source	Rating
AllMusic	3.5/5 stars
Christgau's Record Guide	C

Born Late is the second studio album by American singer Shaun Cassidy. The album was released in 1977 following the success of Cassidy's self-titled debut album.

Born Late yielded two hit singles. The first, "Hey Deanie", was written by Eric Carmen, who also wrote the song "That's Rock 'n' Roll" (which was a hit from Cassidy's first solo album). "Hey Deanie" reached #7 on the Billboard Hot 100 in early 1978. For the second single, also following the formula of his first album's hit cover of the Crystals' "Da Doo Ron Ron", Cassidy remade a 1960s hit, in this case the Lovin' Spoonful's "Do You Believe in Magic?" (which was written by John Sebastian). That single became a modest hit, peaking at #31 on the US Billboard Hot 100.

Born Late was certified platinum. Unlike his first album, Cassidy wrote or co-wrote half of the songs. The track "It's Up to You" was co-written with Cassidy by Lost in Space child-star Billy Mumy. "Carolina's Comin' Home" is a cover of a 1971 White Plains song from their album When You Are a King.

== Track listing ==
1. "Teen Dream" (Shaun Cassidy)
2. "Do You Believe in Magic" (John Sebastian)
3. "Baby, Baby, Baby" (Jay Gruska, D. Leineke)
4. "It's Up to You" (Cassidy, David Joliffe, Bill Mumy)
5. "Audrey" (Cassidy, Joliffe)
6. "Hey Deanie" (Eric Carmen)
7. "A Girl Like You" (Felix Cavaliere, Eddie Brigati)
8. "Walk Away" (Cassidy)
9. "Carolina's Comin' Home" (Roger Cook, Roger Greenaway, John Goodison, Tony Hiller)
10. "Strange Sensation" (Cassidy)

== Charts ==
=== Weekly charts ===
Chart (1977–1978)	Peak position
Australia (Kent Music Report)	38
US Billboard 200	6

=== Year-end charts ===
Chart (1978)	Position
US Billboard 200	58
