= Warren Schatz =

Warren Schatz, born in New York City, Brooklyn (November 3, 1945) is a prominent producer, arranger and orchestra conductor during the 1970s.

Warren Schatz is famous for composing, producing, arranging, and conducting the orchestra for such mid- to late-1970s disco recording artists as Frankie Valli, Vicki Sue Robinson, The Brothers, Revelation, Evelyn King, and Gordon Grody.

He started as a delivery boy at Associated Recording in 1957 and by the time he was 14 he started his career as an engineer, recording song demos with Paul Simon, Neil Diamond, Burt Bacharach, Hal David, Dionne Warwick, Jeff Barry and Ellie Greenwich, Barry Mann and Cynthia Weil, Carole King and Gerry Goffin.

During this time he started recording himself under the name Ritchie Dean, The Whispers, The Warmest Spring, The American Youth Choir, The Petrified Forrest, and Warren Schatz. Recording for Swirl, Imperial, Cameo/Parkway, Laurie, Tower (Capitol), Mercury, Polydor, Warner Bros.

In 1968 he and his partner, Stephen Schlaks, produced Wilkinson Tricycle for Columbia's Date Records, Banshee for Atlantic, and Yesterday's Children for Map City.

In 1970 he signed with managers Rachel Elkind and Walter Carlos, who had just had a big hit with "Switched On Bach," and released an album on Columbia Records.

During a performance at Budokan Hall in Tokyo, he became friends with Jukka Kuoppamaki, who brought him to Finland to tour with him. While living in Helsinki, he represented the U.S. At the Sopot Music Festival in Poland, where he won the Press Prize. For the next two years he toured throughout Eastern Europe and produced an album for Jukka on EMI and his second album for Love Records, which was also released by EMI in Sweden, Holland, Global Records in Germany, Polskie Nagrania "Muza" in Poland, Electrecord in Romania and Beverly in Brazil.

When he returned home to the U.S., he was hired as arranger by Hank Medress and Dave Appel for Tony Orlando's "To Be With You" then Frankie Valli album for Private Stock Records, which included his hit "Our Day Will Come". During that time Allen Stanton hired him as a song plugger at RCA's publishing company, Sumbury/Dunbar, where he signed and/or recorded Vicki Sue Robinson, The Brothers, Evelyn "Champagne" King, Fandango featuring Joe Lynn Turner, and The New York Community Choir.

While "Turn The Beat Around" was climbing the charts he was tapped by RCA's NBC network to become the on-air audio engineer for the first season of Saturday Night Live, where he stayed for nine months before he fully resumed his position at Sunbury/Dunbar.

With great success he was promoted to National VP of A&R at RCA in 1976 and was responsible for all artists on the RCA roster, from Roger Whittaker to Hall & Oates. He signed Triumph, Bonnie Tyler, Toby Beau, Machine, Kristy and Jimmy McNichol. All had hits. He moved on to become COO and Senior VP at Ariola America, BMG's first label in the U.S. where he signed Viola Wills and Krokus, who both had hits.

After Ariola he started Perfect Sound Studios, Inc. where he continued to produce Vicki Sue Robinson for Prelude and Profile; Viola Wills for Hansa; and Menage's "Memory," also for Profile. He created the successful "What If Mozart Wrote" series for RCA Red Seal. The first album, What If Mozart Wrote Have Yourself a Merry Little Christmas. Warren was nominated for a Grammy for writing and producing the music video for "Get a Job" from the second "What If" album. He also recorded with Ann Hampton Callaway, Frankie Laine, John O'Conor, Julie Budd, and Barbara Carroll.

Perfect Sound also started creating projects for corporate communications and had CitiBank, Chemical Bank, Xerox and Hess Oil as clients.

In 1999 Warren went to work at TVT, TommyBoy and Urban Box Office as head of manufacturing and distribution.

Moving into video in 2007, he started creating video content and marketing support for "Big Data" companies Opera Solutions, MIT and Connotate.

He is currently Executive VP at Penalty Entertainment, the classic Hip-Hop label relaunched by his friend Neil Levine.

In 1965 the Swedish garage pop group Ola & the Janglers recorded a Warren Schatz composition, "Tomorrow's On Your Side", only available on two EPs, GEP-66 (Ola & the Janglers EP) and JSEP-5547 (various artists EP) in Sweden.

Warren Schatz has also recorded obscure cover versions of Finnish singer Irwin Goodman's songs, released on two ultra-rare CBS singles in the early 1970s: CBS 1405: "Don't You Go Away Again" ("Tositarkoituksin") with "I've Been Wonderin" ("Ei Tippa Tapa") on the flip side and CBS 8344: "Boing, Boing, Boing" with "Tomorrow On My Own" on the flip side.
