= So Sad About Us =

1966 song by The Who

Song by the Who

from the album A Quick One
- Released: 9 December 1966
- Recorded: October 1966
- Studio: IBC Studios (London)
- Genre: Power pop; garage rock
- Length: 3:09
- Label: Reaction
- Songwriter: Pete Townshend
- Producer: Kit Lambert

Official audio
- "So Sad About Us" on YouTube

"So Sad About Us" is a song by the English rock band the Who, first released on the band's second studio album A Quick One (1966). Originally written for the Merseys, "So Sad About Us" has likely been covered more frequently than any other song on the album; according to AllMusic, it is "one of the Who's most covered songs". Versions by the Breeders and the Jam are among the best known covers.

The Who FAQ author Mike Segretto describes "So Sad About Us" as "an unusually mature, bittersweet farewell for a sixties pop group." Instead of criticizing the girl he is breaking up with, the singer admits that he will always love her while acknowledging that their relationship can't last.

Beyond the sheer number of covers, it is also one of the Who's most frequently imitated songs. As the aforementioned AMG put it, it is "an archetypal early Who song" and "hundreds of bands have based their entire careers on this one song". With its ringing guitars, unpolished harmonies, crashing drums, and lovelorn lyrics, it is one of the early forebears of the power pop genre.

The Jam covered this song as a B-side on their single "Down in the Tube Station at Midnight".

== Personnel ==
The Who

- Roger Daltrey – co-lead vocals
- Pete Townshend – guitar, backing vocals
- John Entwistle – bass guitar, co-lead vocals
- Keith Moon – drums
