= Shaun Cassidy =

American singer, actor, producer and writer (born 1958)

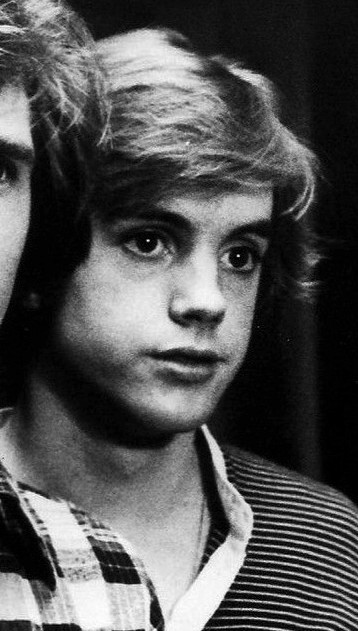
- Cassidy in 1977
- Born: Shaun Paul Cassidy; September 27, 1958 (age 68); Los Angeles, California, U.S.
- Occupations: Singer; songwriter; actor; producer; screenwriter
- Years active: 1976–present
- Known for: The Hardy Boys/Nancy Drew Mysteries; General Hospital
- Spouses: Ann Pennington (m. 1979; div. 1993) Susan Diol (m. 1995; div. 2003) Tracey Lynne Turner (m. 2004)
- Children: 7
- Parents: Jack Cassidy; Shirley Jones
- Relatives: David Cassidy (half-brother); Patrick Cassidy (brother); Katie Cassidy (niece)
- Musical career
- Genres: Pop rock; new wave; bubblegum; R&B
- Instruments: Guitar; piano
- Label: Warner Bros. (U.S.)

Shaun Paul Cassidy (born September 27, 1958) is an American singer, actor, television producer and screenwriter. He has created or produced a number of television series, including American Gothic, Roar, and Invasion. Cassidy was also an executive producer and writer for NBC's medical drama New Amsterdam.

While in high school, Cassidy signed a contract with Warner Bros. Records, leading to his albums Shaun Cassidy, Born Late, Under Wraps, Room Service, and Wasp. Almost concurrently, Cassidy starred in the ABC television series The Hardy Boys (January 1977 – January 1979), as well as the short-lived television version of Breaking Away, and had a stint on the daytime soap General Hospital.

While appearing on Broadway in the musical drama Blood Brothers, Cassidy wrote his first television pilot, American Gothic (1995). In 2020, Cassidy returned to the stage with his one-man show The Magic of a Midnight Sky. Cassidy is the eldest child of Academy Award–winning actress Shirley Jones and the second child of Tony Award–winning actor Jack Cassidy. Shaun is the older brother of Patrick and Ryan Cassidy, and the younger half-brother of David Cassidy, and the uncle of Katie Cassidy.

== Early life, family and education ==
Shaun Cassidy grew up in Los Angeles, California, and New York City; he is the son of Shirley Jones and Jack Cassidy. In addition to an elder half-brother, David Cassidy, he has two younger brothers, Patrick and Ryan Cassidy. He attended boarding school in Bucks County, Pennsylvania, at the Solebury School in Solebury Township, and graduated from Beverly Hills High School.

== Career ==
=== Singer and recording artist ===
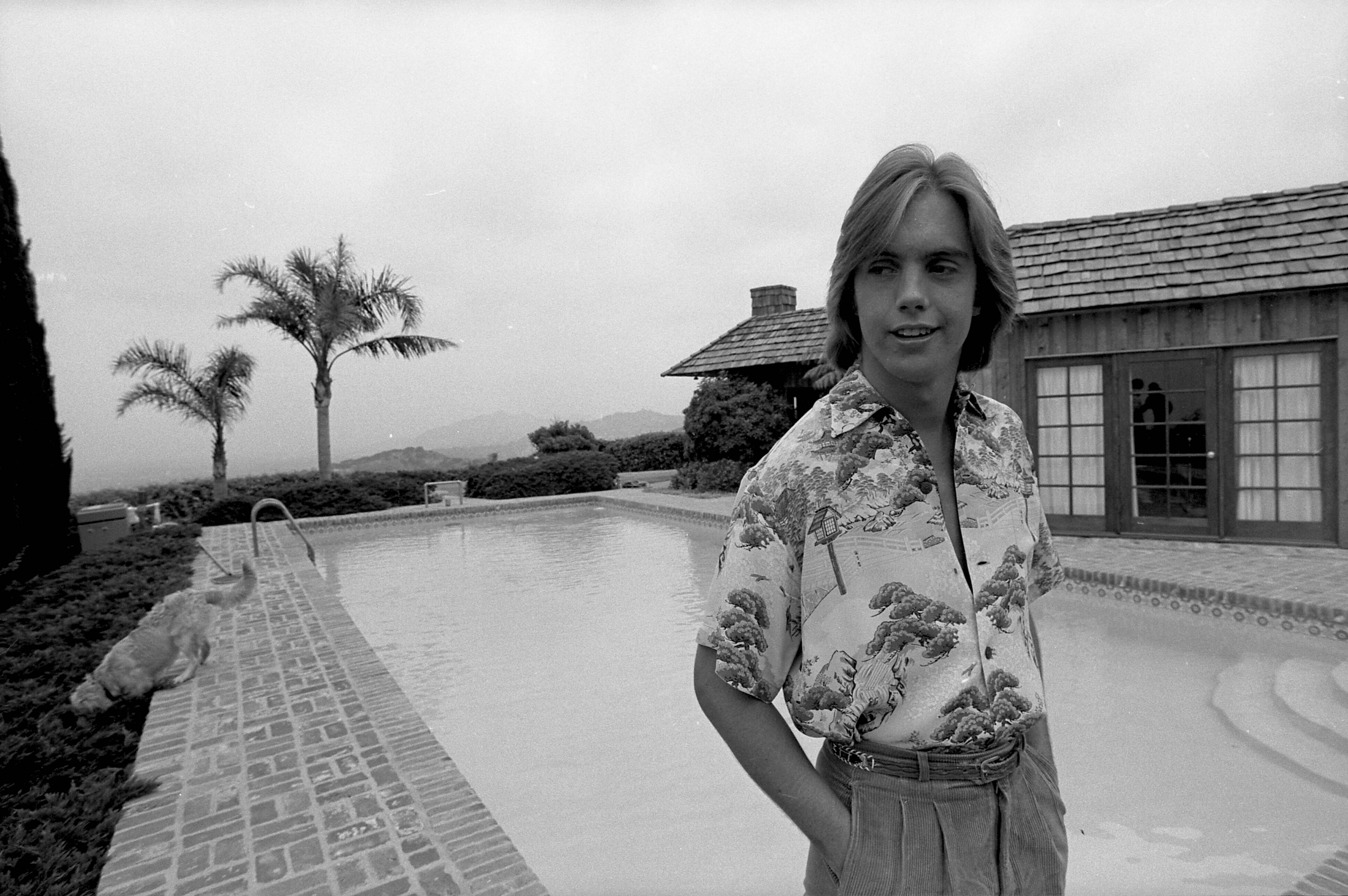
Cassidy in 1978 for the Los Angeles Times

While still in high school, Cassidy signed a contract with Mike Curb's Curb Records division of Warner Bros. Records and began recording music. He scored a couple of hit singles in several countries, leading to an American release of his first solo album, Shaun Cassidy, in 1977. The multi-platinum album netted him a number-one U.S. Billboard Hot 100 single with "Da Doo Ron Ron" and a nomination for the Grammy Award for Best New Artist at the 20th Annual Grammy Awards. The Eric Carmen–penned "That's Rock 'n' Roll" (which had already been a hit in Australia and Europe) was the follow-up single and peaked at No. 3. His popularity continued with the concurrent arrival of his television series, The Hardy Boys Mysteries (1977–1979).

Cassidy's next album Born Late netted the hit "Hey Deanie" (#7), also written by Carmen, and a remake of The Lovin' Spoonful's "Do You Believe in Magic?" became a moderate hit for Cassidy, peaking at No. 31.

Cassidy had released two successful albums, but by the release of his third album, 1978's million-seller Under Wraps, AM radio was in decline and his teen-star appeal had begun to fade. His next album, Room Service, failed to chart on the US Billboard 200. Cassidy tried a different musical approach for his final release, 1980's Wasp. This album was more rock/pop-oriented and produced by Todd Rundgren with the group Utopia as the backing band. It featured songs written by Rundgren, Cassidy, and cover versions of songs including David Bowie's "Rebel, Rebel" and The Who's "So Sad About Us" among others.

=== Actor ===
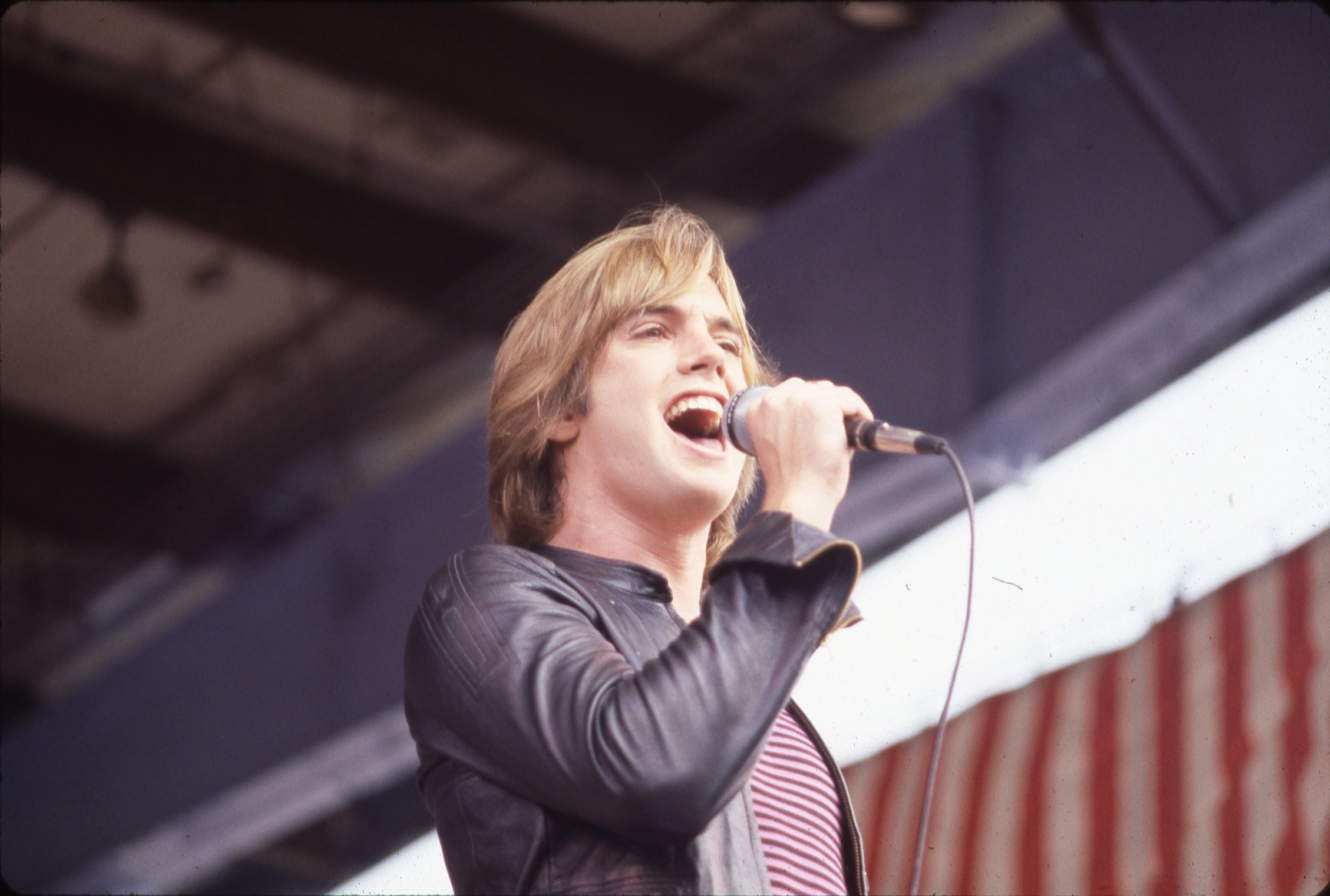
Cassidy singing at the Ohio State Fair August 25, 1979

Cassidy concentrated on stage acting for most of the 1980s and early 1990s. He appeared on Broadway and West End productions such as Mass Appeal and Bus Stop, as well as the American premiere of Pass/Fail at the Mark Taper Forum in Los Angeles. Cassidy won a Drama-Logue Award for his work in Mark Sheriden's Diary of a Hunger Strike at the Los Angeles Theater Center, and he appeared opposite his half-brother David in the Broadway production of Blood Brothers (which successfully ran for over a year on Broadway, landing Cassidy on the cover of People magazine for the third time). It was during this production that Cassidy wrote his first television pilot, American Gothic, opening the door to a long-term contract with Universal Television.

=== Writer and producer ===
Since then, Cassidy has created, written, and produced numerous shows for network and cable including American Gothic (1995–1996, produced with Sam Raimi), Roar (1997, starring Heath Ledger), Cover Me (2000–2001), Invasion (2005–2006), Ruby & The Rockits (2009, starring his brothers Patrick and David) and New Amsterdam (2018–2023, starring Ryan Eggold) on NBC.

In 2021, Cassidy took his one-man show The Magic of a Midnight Sky to the stage, playing to standing-room-only crowds nationwide, his first live music performance in almost forty years.

== Personal life ==
Cassidy has been married three times and has seven children. He married Ann Pennington, a model and former Playboy playmate, in 1979 and divorced in 1993; they had two children together.

Cassidy married actress Susan Diol in 1995 and divorced in 2003; they have one daughter.

In 2004, he married producer Tracey Lynne Turner; they have four children.

Cassidy is also the godson of the late singer and actor Gordon MacRae, who co-starred with his mother in two films, Oklahoma! and Carousel.

== Discography ==
- Shaun Cassidy (1976)
- Born Late (1977)
- Under Wraps (1978)
- Room Service (1979)
- Wasp (1980)

== Filmography ==
As actor
| Year | Title | Role | Notes |
|---|---|---|---|
| 1976 | Born of Water | Christopher Wentworth Hewlitt | |
| 1977–1979 | The Hardy Boys/Nancy Drew Mysteries | Joe Hardy | Main cast (46 episodes) |
| 1978 | The Goldie Hawn Special | Himself | Television special |
| 1979 | Like Normal People | Roger Meyers | Television film |
| 1980–1981 | Breaking Away | Dave Stoller | Main cast (8 episodes) |
| 1985 | American Playhouse | Dave Dischinger | Episode: "Breakfast with Les and Bess" |
| 1987 | Murder, She Wrote | Chad Singer | Episode: "Murder in a Minor Key" |
| 1987 | General Hospital | Dusty Walker | 11 episodes |
| 1988 | Once Upon a Texas Train | Cotton | Television film |
| 1988 | Matlock | Craig Gentry | 2 episodes |
| 1988 | Alfred Hitchcock Presents | Dale Thurston | Episode: "Hippocritic Oath" |
| 1988 | Roots: The Gift | Edmund Parker Jr. | Television film |
| 1995 | Your Studio and You | Himself | Short film |

As writer and producer
| Year | Title | Notes |
|---|---|---|
| 1991 | Strays | Television film, also co-producer |
| 1994 | Midnight Run for Your Life | Television film |
| 1995 | American Gothic | 8 episodes, also supervising producer |
| 1997 | Roar | 5 episodes, also creator and executive producer |
| 1997 | Players | Episode: "Con Job", also creator |
| 1998 | Hollyweird | Television pilot, also creator and executive producer |
| 2000 | Cover Me | 9 episodes, also creator and executive producer |
| 2001 | The Agency | 3 episodes, also executive producer |
| 2003 | Cold Case | Executive producer |
| 2004 | The Mountain | 2 episodes, also executive producer |
| 2005–2006 | Invasion | 12 episodes, also creator and executive producer |
| 2008 | Inseperable | Television pilot, also executive producer |
| 2009 | Ruby & the Rockits | 2 episodes, also creator and executive producer |
| 2011–2012 | Blue Bloods | Consulting producer |
| 2012 | The Frontier | Executive producer |
| 2014 | Hysteria | Television pilot, also executive producer |
| 2017 | Emerald City | 2 episodes, also executive producer |
| 2017 | Redlners | Television pilot, also executive producer |
| 2018–2023 | New Amsterdam | 8 episodes, also executive producer |
| 2022 | Unbroken | Television pilot, also executive producer |
