= Dirty Dancing (franchise) =

Film franchise

- Official franchise logo
- Based on: Dirty Dancing by Eleanor Bergstein
- Distributed by: Lions Gate Entertainment
- Country: United States
- Language: English
- Budget: $30,000,000 (Total of 2 films)
- Box office: $242,263,364 (Total of 2 films)

The Dirty Dancing franchise consists of American dance-romance installments, including two theatrical films, one television series adaptation, one made-for-TV musical remake movie, five reality competition television shows, and various additional multi-media. Based on an original story by Eleanor Bergstein, the plot centers around young women from past decades who are introduced to dancing by experienced males, with the pair becoming romantically involved.

The original movie initially had mixed critical reception, despite being a box office success and earning the studios a profit. It has been regarded with positivity over the years from modern analysis, earning its cult status. The 2004 prequel movie in contrast received mostly negative reviews from critics, and earned a fraction of its predecessor's income. Similarly, the 2017 television adaptation received negative reviews which compared it as inferior to the theatrical release. The various additional media releases have achieved mild successes, with meager critical reception.

The franchise will continue with a legacy sequel film in development. The sequel was scheduled for theatrical release in summer 2025, but was not released that summer.

== Film ==
Film	U.S. release date	Director	Screenwriter(s)	Story by	Producer(s)
Dirty Dancing	August 21, 1987	Emile Ardolino	Eleanor Bergstein	Eleanor Bergstein	Linda Gottlieb
Dirty Dancing: Havana Nights	February 27, 2004	Guy Ferland	Victoria Arch and Boaz Yakin	Kate Gunzinger and Peter Sagal	Lawrence Bender and Sarah Green
Untitled film	TBA	TBA	Kim Rosenstock	TBA	Nina Jacobson and Brad Simpson

=== Dirty Dancing (1987) ===
In 1963, high school graduate Frances "Baby" Houseman's carefree adventures draw to a close as she is about to enroll in the Peace Corps. With hopes to enjoy her final days of her youth, her hopes find her disappointed at an uneventful resort with her parents. In the quiet Catskill Mountains, she searches for new ways to keep herself entertained. Discovering dance lessons being led by a slightly older Johnny Castle, she quickly finds that her affect for him surpasses her interest in the aerobic sport. As the pair continue dancing they begin to become romantically involved as an upcoming final summer event draws near. Just when they thought their love couldn't end, Baby's father forbids her from continuing to see Johnny. Determined to see all their work realized and to further their relationship, Baby and Johnny pursue their future together in secret.

=== Dirty Dancing: Havana Nights (2004) ===
In 1958, an American high school student named Katey Miller moves with her parents and younger sister to Cuba during the Cuban Revolution. Over a series of events where she tries to become familiar with her new home, she meets an unwealthy local waiter named Javier Suarez. As the pair begin spending more time with each other, a romance begins to grow between them. Javier takes Katey to a nightclub to introduce her to moves of his culture. She discovers the activity is her passion, and as the relationship grows more serious, Fidel Castro is named as Prime Minister of the country and quickly rises in power as dictator. Though her parents initially disapproved of their romantic relations, they notify Katey of their plans to flee Cuba and escape the totalitarian leadership emerging. Faced with a difficult decision, she must decide whether her safety is more urgent than her affection for Javier and the Cuban culture.

=== Untitled sequel ===
In July 2020, a new film starring Jennifer Grey and centered around dancing in the '90s was announced to be in development. Tabloids speculated that this project would be a new Dirty Dancing film. This was confirmed by August of the same year, when a third film intended to serve as the direct sequel to the original, was officially announced to be in development; Grey will reprise her role from the first movie, in addition to serving as executive producer. Jonathan Levine will direct the film, from a script co-written by Mikki Daughtry and Tobias Iaconis. Gillian Bohrer will serve as producer. The project will be a joint-venture production between Lionsgate Films and Megamix Productions. In September 2021, Grey expressed her excitement for the project while stating that the creatives involved are working hard to get it right for the fans, while paying respects to Swayze who passed in 2009.

In April 2022 at CinemaCon, the project was officially confirmed by Lionsgate to have been green-lit, and entered pre-production. The plot was stated to center around Frances "Baby" Houseman's return to Kellerman's where she will serve as an instructor. By May, it was confirmed that Jonathan Levine will serve as director, with the most recent draft of the script co-written by Elizabeth Chomko and Levine. The plot will take place in the '90s, and center around a coming-of-age romance of a young woman, who crosses paths with Frances "Baby" Houseman. The studio intends to feature an ensemble cast of characters from the original film, alongside new characters. The filmmaker acknowledged that they are working closely with Patrick Swayze's estate, to incorporate plot elements that reference his character from the first film, Johnny Castle. Levine stated: "...Johnny’s absence looms large over the story...[He] is a part of Baby's journey in the story." The sequel will feature music from the original release, including Eric Carmen's "Hungry Eyes", as well as songs that were released up to '90s-era hip-hop. Levine will also serve as a producer alongside his business partner, Bohrer. The untitled film will be a presence at the 2022 Cannes Film Festival market as Lionsgate looks for collaborative studios for the project, and is tentatively scheduled for a 2024 release date. In January 2023, Grey stated that there are intentionally no updates regarding the project, as the creatives involved are working hard to make the movie "perfect" before it goes into principal photography.

Principal photography began on June 30, 2024. The film was scheduled for summer of 2025 release date, but was not released that summer. In January 2026, the sequel was announced to be produced by Nina Jacobson and Brad Simpson and the script will be written by Kim Rosenstock. Grey will still reprise her role as well as executive produce, along with Levine who will no longer direct.

== Television ==
=== Series ===
Series	Season	Episodes	Originally released			Showrunners	Executive Producer
Series	Season	Episodes	First released	Last released	Network	Showrunners	Executive Producer
Dirty Dancing	1	11	October 29, 1988	January 14, 1989	CBS	Robert Rabinowitz and Barra Grant	Steve Tisch

Released fourteen months after the 1987 feature film, the television series adaptation was developed by in collaboration by Robert Rabinowitz and Barra Grant with executive producer Steve Tisch, with Kenny Ortega returning as choreographer from the movie. Melora Hardin and Patrick Cassidy were cast in the co-starring roles of Baby Max and Johnny Castle, respectively. Debuting on October 29, 1988, with distribution through Columbia Broadcasting System, the show lasted one season (a total of eleven episodes).

=== Reality competitions ===
==== Dirty Dancing: Living the Dream (2006) ====
Hosted by Cris Judd, the reality competition series featured amateur young women, who were paired with professional male dancers. Created by Lionsgate Studios and Sony Channel, the series was released on WEtv with Judd and Eddie Garcia served as choreographers for the dance routines. Debuting in December 2006, the format included thirty women referred to as "the Babys", who competed through dance to be chosen by one of the six men referred to as "the Johnnys"; should they be selected, they would then be trained professionally over the following weeks. The weakest competitor was eliminated from the competition each week, with the series culminating with the finale couple being declared "Dirty Dancing Champions". The winner was given a professional dance contract, and was awarded a trip to London, England to see Dirty Dancing: The Musical.

==== Dirty Dancing: The Time of Your Life (2007–2008) ====
Created by Clare Hollywood, the reality competition show was designed to give its contestants the real-life experience of the original film. The structure of the show took inexperienced female dancers and paired them with older professionals, with attempt to recreate the Baby-Johnny dynamic of the movie; filmed at the same location of the movie at the Mountain Lake Resort in Virginia. Each week the couples performed their routines, with the judges declaring the best and worst couples, with the latter being eliminated at the end of the episode. Glen Middleham served as executive producer for Granada Entertainment, in collaboration with Virgin Media Television and Living Network serving as the airing network. The popularity of the series, resulted in two seasons being produced. Miranda Garrison, Sean Cheesman, and Jennifer Ellison featured as the judges during the first season, while Kelly Brook replaced Ellison during the second and final season.

==== The Real Dirty Dancing (2019–2022) ====
Each respective series was designed to pair celebrities with professional dancers to recreate sequences from the original movie. The routines were accompanied by musical numbers and scenes from the film.

Australian series (2019)

Directed by James Collins, the series was developed by Eureka Productions; presented and choreographed by Todd McKenney and Kym Herjavec, the show debuted in September 2019 on Seven Network and lasted until October of the same year.

American series (2022)

Created and helmed by Dan Martin, the series was released on Fox Broadcasting Company with Stephen "tWitch" Boss serving as the host of the show. Based on the Australian version that preceded it, the show featured guest judges determine the results of the competition. Eureka Productions, Lionsgate Television, and 20th Century Fox Television produced the show which debuted on February 1, 2022, and lasted until February 22 of the same year.

British series (2022)

Created by Genna Gibson, Phil Harris, and Karl Warner based on the Australian show that preceded it; Leigh Francis (as his fictional character "Keith Lemon") and Ashley Roberts served as co-hosts while Jordan Darrell was the series choreographer. The competition show was developed as a joint-venture production between Thames Television and Fremantle, with E4 and All 4 handling distribution. The series debuted on February 21, 2022, and lasted until March 15 of the same year.

=== Television film ===
Film	U.S. release date	Director	Screenwriter	Story by	Producer
Dirty Dancing	May 24, 2017	Wayne Blair	Jessica Sharzer	Jessica Sharzer	Allison Shearmur

In December 2015, a made-for-television semi-musical remake was announced to be in development. While the movie incorporated musical numbers, it was not based on the Broadway musical, with the cast instead singing the songs that featured in the original film. Abigail Breslin and Colt Prattes were cast in the leading roles. Wayne Blair was announced to serve as director, with a teleplay script written by Jessica Sharzer. Adam Anders and Peer Astrom collaboratively wrote the TV movie score for the soundtrack. The television movie adaptation was met with unanimous negative reception, with criticism towards the acting, the running time, changes to the original film, and the choreography among various other aspects.

== Main cast and characters ==
List indicator

This section includes characters who will appear or have appeared in the franchise in main roles.

- An empty grey cell indicates the character was not in the film, or that the character's official presence has not yet been confirmed.

Character	Films			Television	
Character	Dirty Dancing	Dirty Dancing Havana Nights	Untitled Dirty Dancing film	Dirty Dancing	Dirty Dancing
Character	1987	2004	TBA	1988	2017
Principal cast
Frances "Baby" Houseman	Jennifer Grey		Jennifer Grey	Melora Hardin	Abigail Breslin
Johnny Castle	Patrick Swayze		TBA	Patrick Cassidy	Colt Prattes
Katey Miller		Romola Garai			
Javier Suarez		Diego Luna			
Supporting cast
Dr. Jake Houseman	Jerry Orbach				Bruce Greenwood
Marjorie "Marge" Houseman	Kelly Bishop				Debra Messing
Lisa Houseman	Jane Brucker				Sarah Hyland
Max Kellerman	Jack Weston			McLean Stevenson	Tony Roberts
Neil Kellerman	Lonny Price			Charlie Startton	Trevor Einhorn
Penny Johnson	Cynthia Rhodes			Constance Marie	Nicole Scherzinger
Vivian Pressman	Miranda Garrison				Katey Sagal
Bert Miller		John Slattery			
Jeannie Miller		Sela Ward			
Susie Miller		Mika Boorem			
Carlos Suarez		Rene Lavan			
Mrs. Suarez		Angélica Aragón			
Dance Instructor		Patrick Swayze			
Robin Kellerman				Amanda Ingber	
Norman Bryant				Paul Feig	
Sweets Walker				John Wesley	
Wallace Kahn				Adam S. Bristol	

== Additional crew and production details ==
Film	Crew/Detail					
Film	Composer(s)	Cinematographer	Editor(s)	Production companies	Distributing company	Running time
Dirty Dancing (1987)	John Morris, Erich Bulling & Jon Barns	Jeffrey Jur	Peter C. Frank	Great American Films, Limited Partnership	Vestron Pictures	1 hr 40 mins
Dirty Dancing (The Series)	Michael Lloyd	Frank Byers	Karl Jacobsen	The Steve Tisch Company, Vestron Television	Columbia Broadcasting System (CBS)	5 hrs (30-minute episodes)
Dirty Dancing: Havana Nights	Heitor Pereira	Anthony B. Richmond	Luis Colina & Scott Richter	Miramax Films, Artisan Entertainment, A Band Apart Films, Havana Nights LLC, Lawrence Bender Productions	Lions Gate Films	1 hr 26 mins
Dirty Dancing (2017)	Adam Anders & Peer Astrom	John Lindley	Michael P. Shawver	Lionsgate Television, Allison Shearmur Productions	Lionsgate Television	2 hrs 10 mins
Untitled sequel	TBA	TBA	TBA	Lionsgate Films, Megamix Productions	Lions Gate Entertainment	TBA

== Reception ==
=== Box office and financial performance ===
Film	Box office gross			Box office ranking		Worldwide total video sales	Worldwide total gross income	Budget	Worldwide total net income	Ref.
Film	North America	Other territories	Worldwide	All time worldwide	North America	Worldwide total video sales	Worldwide total gross income	Budget	Worldwide total net income	Ref.
Dirty Dancing	$64,577,242	$150,001,106	$214,578,348	#1,379	No. 679	$32,557,202 (Note: Running total of home video sales, as of May 2021.)	$247,135,550	$6,000,000	$241,135,550	
Dirty Dancing: Havana Nights	$14,161,590	$13,523,426	$27,685,016	#4,556	#15,941	Information not publicly available	>$27,685,016	$25,000,000	>$2,685,016	
Untitled sequel	TBD	TBD	TBD	TBD	TBD	TBD	TBD	TBA	TBD	
Totals	$78,738,832	$163,524,532	$242,263,364	x̄ #2,968	x̄ #8,310	>$32,557,202	>$274,820,566	$30,000,000	>$243,820,566	

=== Critical and public response ===
Film	Rotten Tomatoes	Metacritic	CinemaScore
Dirty Dancing (1987)	69% (70 reviews)	65/100 (20 reviews)	A−
Dirty Dancing (The Series)	—N/a	27/100 (7 reviews)	—N/a
Dirty Dancing: Havana Nights	23% (108 reviews)	39/100 (32 reviews)	B
Dirty Dancing: Living the Dream	—N/a	TBD	—N/a
Dirty Dancing (2017)	19% (21 reviews)	39/100 (16 reviews)	—N/a
The Real Dirty Dancing	TBD	46/100 (4 reviews)	—N/a
Untitled Dirty Dancing sequel			

== Stage ==
=== Dirty Dancing: The Classic Story on Stage ===
Created for Broadway performance, a musical was created with use of the songs from the soundtrack of the 1987 film. Developed as a joint-venture between Lions Gate Entertainment and Magic Hour Productions, the original movie's screenwriter Eleanor Bergstein being commissioned to join the project as playwright. Federico Bellone served as director, with Austin Wilks as choreographer and Karl Sydow serving as producer. Bergstein additionally wrote the accompanying production book. Debuting on the West End circuit in 2006 and again in 2013, the production returned in 2023 for a national tour. The show is scheduled to open on Broadway at the Lena Horne Theatre in March 2027 for a run scheduled to last through September of that year.

The adaptation was met with mixed critical reception, with praise for its dance numbers and nostalgic value. In contrast, the musical has been a financial success for the associated companies.

=== Dirty Dancing in Concert ===
Developed as a multi-media production where the original feature film is projected on screen above a stage with dancers as well as live music from singers and a band, the project has toured various states and venues. The production has received positive critical reception.

== In other media ==
Video game

The Codemasters Software Company Limited developed and distributed Dirty Dancing: The Video Game, through their subsidiary Codemasters Online Gaming, as a puzzle oriented PC video game. Through the use of various mini-games, the player accumulates "money" in the form of points, to which they can use to customize the resort from the movie. Users complete the "End of Season Dance Contest" for the final event of the story.

Travel

The Resort featured in the franchise was filmed at the Mountain Lake Lodge in Virginia's Blue Ridge Mountains. Renovated in 2012, the location has various rooms detailed to more closely match the rooms seen on screen. During the summertime, the surrounding areas hold Dirty Dancing themed events, with large numbers of tourist fans planning vacations to this location year-round and especially during this time.
