= Dirty Dancing (disambiguation) =

Dirty Dancing is a 1987 film.

Dirty Dancing may also refer to:

- Dirty Dancing (1988 TV series), an American television series that aired on CBS
- Dirty Dancing: Living the Dream, an American reality series that aired on WE tv network
- Dirty Dancing (2017 film), a musical television remake of the 1987 film
- Dirty Dancing (album), by Swayzak
- "Dirty Dancing" (song), by New Kids on the Block
- Dirty Dancing (soundtrack), soundtrack to the 1987 film
- Dirty Dancing: Havana Nights (also known as Dirty Dancing 2 or Dirty Dancing 2: Havana Nights), a 2004 film
- Dirty Dancing: The Classic Story on Stage, a stage musical
- Dirty Dancing: The Time of Your Life, a British TV series
- "Dirty Dancing", The Keith & Paddy Picture Show season 1, episode 1 (2017)
