= Dirty Dancer (disambiguation) =

"Dirty Dancer" is a 2011 song by Enrique Iglesias featuring Usher.

Dirty Dancer may also refer to:

== Music ==
- "Dirty Dancer" (Kingsland Road song), 2014
- "Dirty Dancer", a 1984 song by The Bar Kays from Dangerous
- "Dirty Dancer", a 2010 song by Reggie Sears
- "Dirty Dancer", a 2011 song by Oh My! featuring Scrufizzer

== Other ==
- Dirty Dancer, a 2006 book by Thomas Engström

== See also ==
- Dirty Dancing (disambiguation)
