= Salsa (film) =

1988 film by Boaz Davidson

- Theatrical release poster
- Directed by: Boaz Davidson
- Written by: Boaz Davidson; Eli Tabor
- Screenplay by: Boaz Davidson; Tomas Benitez; Shepard Goldman
- Story by: Boaz Davidson; Eli Tabor
- Produced by: Menahem Golan; Yoram Globus
- Starring: Robby Rosa; Rodney Harvey; Miranda Garrison; Angela Alvarado
- Cinematography: David Gurfinkel
- Edited by: Alain Jakubowicz
- Distributed by: The Cannon Group, Inc. A Golan-Globus Production
- Release date: May 7, 1988
- Running time: 97 minutes
- Country: United States
- Language: English
- Budget: $6 million
- Box office: $8.8 million

Salsa is a 1988 romance film directed by Boaz Davidson and starring Robby Rosa, Rodney Harvey, Angela Alvarado and Miranda Garrison. The film, about Puerto Rican dancer Rico who decides to enter a salsa dancing contest, earned a nomination for the Golden Raspberry Award for Worst New Star for Rosa at the 9th Golden Raspberry Awards.

== Plot ==
In a nightly escape from his day job as a mechanic, Rico enters his true element: the wild exuberance of "La Luna", a salsa club located in East Los Angeles, California. Dreaming of making himself and Vicky, his girlfriend, the "King and Queen of Salsa", Rico pours all his energy into winning La Luna's Grand Salsa Competition. But when Luna, the club's gorgeous owner sets her sights on making Rico her dance partner, Rico must decide what drives him, his ambition or his heart.

== Cast ==
- Robby Rosa as Rico
- Rodney Harvey as Ken
- Magali Alvarado as Rita
- Miranda Garrison as Luna
- Moon Orona as Lola
- Angela Alvarado as Vicki
- Loyda Ramos as Mother
- Valente Rodriguez as Chuey
- Daniel Rojo as Orlando
- Humberto Ortiz as Beto
- Roxan Flores as Nena
- Robert Gould as Boss
- Deborah Chesher as Sister
- Debra Ortega as Aunt
- Renee Victor as Aunt
- Joanne Garcia as Waitress

As themselves

- Leroy Anderson
- Bobby Caldwell
- Chain Reaction
- Willie Colón
- Celia Cruz
- Mavis Vegas Davis
- Marisela
- Grupo Latino
- La Dimencion
- Mongo Santamaria
- Kenny Ortega
- Tito Puente
- Michael Sembello
- Wilkins
- The Edwin Hawkins Singers

== Reception ==
On review aggregator Rotten Tomatoes, the film has a 20% approval rating based on five reviews.

== Soundtrack ==
1. "Margarita" - Wilkins
2. "Chicos y chicas" - Mavis Vegas Davis
3. "Cali Pachanguero" - Grupo Niche
4. "Your Love" - Laura Branigan
5. "Good Lovin'" - Kenny Ortega with Chain Reaction & The Edwin Hawkins Singers
6. "Under My Skin" - Robby Rosa
7. "Oye Como Va" - Tito Puente
8. "I Know" - Marisela with The Edwin Hawkins Singers
9. "Spanish Harlem" - Ben E. King
10. "Puerto Rico" - Bobby Caldwell, Marisela, Michael Sembello & Wilkins with Mongo Santamaría, Charlie Palmieri & The Edwin Hawkins Singers
