= Miranda Garrison =

American actress

Miranda Garrison is an American actress, dancer, and choreographer, best known for her film choreography.

== Career ==
For the 1987 film Dirty Dancing, starring Patrick Swayze, Miranda Garrison assisted Kenny Ortega in choreography; she also acted in the film, playing the part of Vivian Pressman. For the 1988 film Salsa, she acted the part of Luna, the owner of a Los Angeles salsa club and a romantic interest. In this film, she danced numbers from her own work as the choreographer. In the 1990 film The Forbidden Dance about the Lambada from Brazil, she again appeared as an actress-dancer, performing in the role of Mickey. In 1996, she assisted choreographer Vincent Paterson in the film Evita, with singer Madonna, based on the 1978 musical of Andrew Lloyd Webber.

Early in her career, Garrison danced in the high-profile 1980 film Xanadu, starring the singer Olivia Newton-John. After Xanadu Garrison was a frequent collaborator with choreographer and later director Kenny Ortega. In 1997, Garrison choreographed Selena, the biographical film about Selena Quintanilla-Pérez, the Tejano singing star whose life was tragically cut short. She was also the choreographer for the 2004 film Dirty Dancing: Havana Nights, set in late-1950s Cuba, and for The Skeleton Key, a supernatural thriller released in 2005. In 2001, she directed the Golden Eagle awards ceremony. In 2007 and 2008, Garrison was a judge in the British reality TV competition, Dirty Dancing: The Time of Your Life. An on-line 'Filmography' for Miranda Garrison lists forty-eight entries for film (34) and TV (14), twelve as an actor and/or a dancer 1979–2005, and thirty-six for choreographic work 1987–2009.
