= Detective in the House =

- Genre: Procedural drama
- Starring: Judd Hirsch
- Country of origin: United States
- Original language: English
- No. of seasons: 1
- No. of episodes: 6

Production
- Running time: 60 minutes
- Production company: Lorimar Productions

Original release
- Network: CBS
- Release: March 15 – April 19, 1985

Detective in the House is an American procedural drama television series that aired on CBS on Friday nights from March 15, 1985 to April 19, 1985. This series was a mid-season replacement for The Dukes of Hazzard.

== Premise ==
Press Wyman, a successful engineer, becomes a private detective with the assistance of retired PI Nick Turner. His wife, Diane, returns to her job as a schoolteacher to pay the bills while Press pursues his fantasy; the Wyman children also appear.

== Cast ==
- Judd Hirsch as Press Wyman
- Jack Elam as Nick Turner
- Cassie Yates as Diane Wyman
- Amanda Ingber as Deborah Wyman
- Meeno Peluce as Todd Wyman
- R.J. Williams as Dunc Wyman

== Episodes ==
No.	Title	Directed by	Written by	Original release date
1	"Whatever Happened to...?"	Bill Bixby	Judy Merl & Paul Eric Myers	March 15, 1985
2	"Fathers and Other Strangers"	Unknown	Unknown	March 22, 1985
3	"Down & Out"	Unknown	Unknown	March 29, 1985
4	"Games People Play"	Unknown	Unknown	April 5, 1985
5	"Gelt by Association"	Unknown	Unknown	April 12, 1985
6	"Moscow on Melrose"	Unknown	Unknown	April 19, 1985
