= Mandy Ingber =

American actress (born 1968)

- Other name: Amanda Ingber
- Occupations: Yoga instructor; actress
- Website: www.mandyingber.com

Mandy Ingber (born January 11, 1968), sometimes credited as Amanda Ingber, is a yoga instructor and a former actress. Before yoga, Ingber became an indoor cycling instructor at the age of 28.

== Early life ==
Ingber was born to a Jewish family, an American born father and a German born mother. In her childhood, she was introduced to yoga by her father in 1975.

== Fitness ==
She is a New York Times best selling author, having written Yogalosophy: 28 Days to the Ultimate Mind-Body Makeover and Yogalosophy for Inner Strength. Ingber has taught yoga to celebrities such as Jennifer Aniston, Ricki Lake, Brooke Shields, Woody Harrelson and Helen Hunt. As a yoga instructor, she has produced instructional training DVDs such as Yogalosophy.

== Acting career ==
Ingber began her career as an actress in the original company of Neil Simon's Tony-award winning play Brighton Beach Memoirs and has played roles in television series, including being Annie Tortelli, wife of the eldest son of Carla, on the television sitcom Cheers and its short-lived spin-off The Tortellis. She also played Robin, Baby's cousin, in the 1988 television series adaptation of the film Dirty Dancing.

Her other roles include Enid, Lila Pembroke's friend, in the first season of Charles in Charge and the titular character's sidekick Polly Goldenberg-Cohen in the 1989 cult classic Teen Witch.

== Filmography ==
=== Film ===
Year	Film	Role	Notes
1983	Mr. Mom	Debbie	
1986	News at Eleven	Karen	Television film
1989	Teen Witch	Polly	
1994	Jack Reed: A Search for Justice	Store Clerk	Television film
1997	The Relic	Donna	
1999	Free Enterprise	Beth	

=== Television ===
Year	Title	Role	Notes
1984	Charles in Charge	Enid	Episodes: "Slumber Party" and "A Date with Enid"
1985	Detective in the House	Deborah Wyman	
1986	Shadow Chasers	Frankie	Episode: "How Green Was My Murder"
1986	Silver Spoons	Julie	Episode: "Rick at 16"
1987	The Tortellis	Annie Tortelli	
1987	I Married Dora	Laurie	Episode: "Our Little Girl's Growing Up"
1985-1988	Cheers	Annie Tortelli	5 episodes
1986-1988	My Sister Sam	Mandy	Episode: "Patti's Party", "Drive, She Said", "Walk a While in My Shoes"
1988-1989	Dirty Dancing	Robin Kellermen	
1990	Lenny	Clerk	Episode: "New York Story"
1991	Sibs	Edna	Episodes: "Warren: The Final Days"
1992	The Wonder Years	Andrea	Episode: "Scenes from a Wedding"
1996	Caroline in the City	Starr Glickman	Episode: "Caroline and the Nice Jewish Boy"
