= Kingsland Road (band) =

English boy band

- Also known as: Kingston road
- Origin: Basingstoke, England
- Genres: Pop
- Years active: 2012–2015, 2019
- Label: Soundcheck
- Past members: Matt Cahill; Joe (Connor) Conaboy; Jay Scott; JJ Thompson; Josh Zaré

Kingsland Road (originally Kingsland) were an English rock and roll-style and urban-inspired funk and disco boy band formed in 2012. The band is made up of Matt Cahill, Joe "Connor" Conaboy, JJ Thompson (known by his surname) and Josh Zaré. Originally a five-piece that included Jay Scott, they were the fourth contestant eliminated on the tenth series of The X Factor in 2013.

Kingsland Road released their debut single "Dirty Dancer" in August 2014 and it peaked at number 85 on the UK Singles Chart. On 23 October, Scott quit the band due to lack of enjoyment. Their debut album We Are the Young was released in March 2015. The group announced they were splitting up in June 2015. In 2019, they announced a reunion show on 21 December 2019.

== Career ==
=== 2012–13: Formation and The X Factor ===
Kingsland Road was originally made up of Josh Zaré from Maidstone, Joe "Connor" Conaboy from Rugby, Jon James "JJ" Thompson from Coventry (known by his surname), Matt Cahill from Gloucester and Jamie "Jay" Scott from Wolverhampton. Zaré and Conaboy already knew each other from college, and invited Scott, Thompson and Cahill to form a band after seeing them on YouTube. They named themselves "Kingsland" as they lived together on Kingsland Road.

In 2013, Kingsland auditioned for the tenth series of The X Factor. In their room audition they sang "Don't You Worry Child", then "Treasure" at the arena. They performed "For Once in My Life" at bootcamp and at judges' houses they sang "Dance with Me Tonight" (in front of original artist Olly Murs) and "A Thousand Years". On 1 October 2013, a week before the live shows, it was announced that Kingsland had been forced to change their name as there was a band in Canada also called Kingsland, so they became Kingsland Road.

Kingsland Road lost the flash vote in week 2 and were in the bottom two, but were saved by the judges. They were in the bottom two again in week 4, where they were up against Tamera Foster. This time they were voted out when Scherzinger, Osbourne and Walsh all voted to eliminate Kingsland Road. When the voting statistics were revealed at the end of the series, Kingsland Road were shown to have received more votes than Foster, meaning if Walsh sent the result to deadlock, Kingsland Road would've been saved and Foster would've been eliminated.

=== 2014–15: Debut album, US record deal and split ===
Kingsland Road funded their debut album We Are the Young through PledgeMusic. In June, they announced their debut single "Dirty Dancer". It was released on 10 August 2014 and debuted at number 85 on the UK Singles Chart. The band promoted the single and album by embarking on their debut UK tour from 2–9 August.

On 7 October 2014, it was announced that Kingsland Road had signed a record deal in the United States. On 22 October, the band announced via their website that Scott had quit because "the boyband life [wasn't] really for him". We Are the Young was released on 15 March 2015. On 1 June, Kingsland Road announced they were disbanding.

== Discography ==
Title	Year	Peak chart positions	Album
Title	Year	UK	Album
"Dirty Dancer"	2014	85	We Are the Young
"Shoreline"	2015	-	We Are the Young
