= Kenny Ortega =

American filmmaker and choreographer

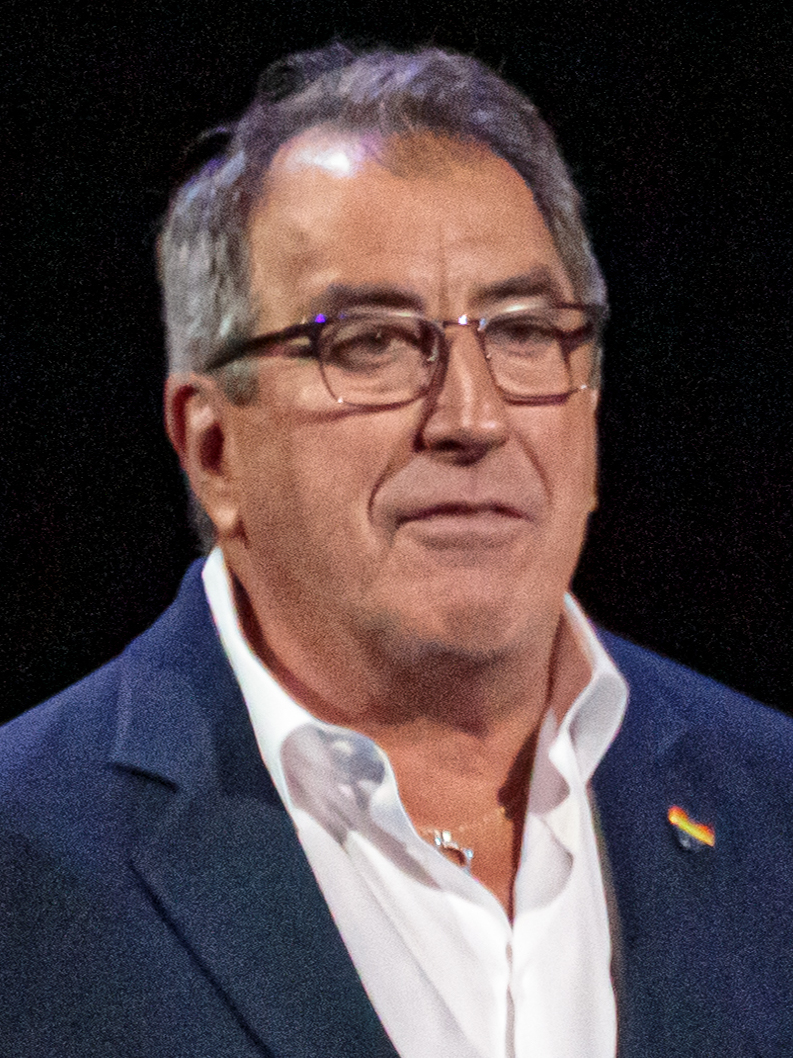
- Ortega in 2019
- Born: Kenneth John Ortega; April 18, 1950 (age 76); Palo Alto, California, U.S.
- Occupations: Director; Producer; Choreographer; Concert Creator
- Years active: 1970–present
- Notable work: Newsies; Hocus Pocus; High School Musical Trilogy; Michael Jackson's This Is It; Descendants; Julie and the Phantoms
- Awards: Primetime Emmy Award for Outstanding Choreography (2006); Hollywood Walk of Fame (2019); Disney Legends Hall of Fame (2019)

Kenneth John Ortega (/ɔːrˈteɪɡə/ or-TAY-gə; born April 18, 1950) is an American director, producer, choreographer, and concert creator. He is best known for his work with Disney Channel, notably the High School Musical film trilogy, cult classics such as Newsies and Hocus Pocus, The Cheetah Girls 2, and the first three Descendants films. In 2019, he signed a five-year deal with Netflix, producing the original series Julie and the Phantoms, which was cancelled after only one season. He has also choreographed multiple iconic 1980s films such as Xanadu, One from the Heart, St. Elmo's Fire, Pretty in Pink, Ferris Bueller's Day Off, and Dirty Dancing.

Ortega has worked on multiple music videos and produced concert tours for the likes of Kiss, Olivia Newton-John, Cher, Madonna, Miley Cyrus, and Michael Jackson, notably the cancelled This is It concert residency. He also wrote, directed, and produced Jackson's posthumous documentary film, Michael Jackson's This Is It. For his work, Ortega was honored with a star on the Hollywood Walk of Fame and a Disney Legend Award in 2019.

== Early life ==
Ortega was born in Palo Alto, California, the son of Madeline, a waitress, and Octavio "Tibby" Ortega, a factory worker. He also has a sister, Debra Ortega and brother, Mark Ortega. Both of his parents were also born in Palo Alto, though his paternal grandparents were Spanish immigrants. He attended Sequoia High School in Redwood City, California, where he was a cheerleader and in the drama group.

== Career ==
Ortega began his career as an actor, appearing in a touring production of Oliver! and Hair before venturing into choreography and directing. Ortega choreographed The Mystic Knights of the Oingo Boingo in the mid to late 1970s. Ortega was offered the leading role in a production of Jesus Christ Superstar, but turned the offer down to become a choreographer for the San Francisco-based band The Tubes after being spotted on the dance floor in a club by members of the band. Ortega toured with the band for ten years, before being contracted by Cher to choreograph a TV special and tour and by Kiss on their Dynasty Tour.

In 1980, Ortega was hired as one of the choreographers on the film Xanadu, working with Gene Kelly who mentored him into choreographing for film. During this time period, Ortega also served as choreographer for several of John Hughes's films, including Pretty in Pink and Ferris Bueller's Day Off, as well as the 1987 film Dirty Dancing.

Ortega would also choreograph several music videos, including "Material Girl" by Madonna, "She's a Beauty" by The Tubes, Physical by Olivia Newton-John and "Mr. Roboto" by Styx. He also produced and choreographed the video for "Rock Me Tonite" by Billy Squier, which turned into a career-ending disaster for the artist.

He made his directorial debut in 1992 with the Disney musical Newsies, which was followed up by Hocus Pocus in 1993. Both films underperformed at the box-office but have since gone on to attract considerable cult followings. Ortega also served as choreographer for To Wong Foo, Thanks for Everything! Julie Newmar in 1995.

Alongside Michael Jackson, he created and designed Jackson's Dangerous World Tour (1992–1993), HIStory World Tour (1996–1997) and Michael Jackson & Friends (1999). He has also choreographed events ranging from Super Bowl XXX, the 72nd Academy Awards, the 1996 Summer Olympics (Atlanta) and the 2002 Winter Olympics (Salt Lake City).

In 2006, Ortega directed and choreographed two Disney Channel Original Movies, High School Musical and The Cheetah Girls 2. Ortega would return as director and choreographer for High School Musical 2 in 2007 and High School Musical 3: Senior Year in 2008.

In April 2009, Ortega began work directing and choreographing the scheduled 50-date Michael Jackson This Is It concert residency at the O2 Arena, billed as Jackson's final concerts in London. The engagement was subsequently cancelled due to Jackson's sudden death on June 25, 2009. Ortega would serve as the director of the Michael Jackson Public Memorial at the Staples Center in Los Angeles, which was broadcast live on several networks on July 7, 2009, reaching a television audience of 31 million in America and more than one billion worldwide.

At the end of the service, he introduced a rendition of Jackson's 1985 charity single "We Are the World" created for the This Is It concerts, featuring Jackson's backing singers on lead vocals with his dancers performing around them. Ortega directed the concert film Michael Jackson's This Is It, which was put together from rehearsal footage recorded at the Los Angeles Forum and the Staples Center. The film was released on October 28 of the same year.

He was set to direct the 2011 Footloose remake, but dropped out in October 2009 due to differences with Paramount over the budget and tone of the film.

Ortega was also hired to direct a film adaptation of the Broadway musical In the Heights for Universal, but the studio dropped the project in 2011 due to budgetary and casting issues. On August 9, 2011, it was announced that Ortega would direct a remake of Dirty Dancing, a project that was later postponed. The 2017 TV remake was filmed without Ortega's involvement.

On May 12, 2014, Ortega guest-judged on the 18th season of Dancing with the Stars during the semifinals.

In 2015, Ortega directed and choreographed Descendants for the Disney Channel, a film based on the children of legendary Disney Villains. He would return in the same capacity for its two sequels, Descendants 2 in 2017 and Descendants 3 in 2019.

In 2019, Ortega was honored with a star on the Hollywood Walk of Fame and was named a Disney Legend at the 2019 D23 Expo.

That fall, he directed and served as executive producer of the Netflix Original series Julie and the Phantoms, which premiered on Netflix on September 10, 2020.

== Personal life ==
Ortega is gay, and in a 2014 interview with anti-bullying organization Bystander Revolution, he said that "as a gay man having grown up in the 50s and 60s, I have to say, I'm very proud of the industry that I work in," referring to the acceptance of people with different sexual orientations in show business.

During the trial People v. Murray regarding the death of Michael Jackson, Ortega was the trial's first witness.

In 2020, Ortega recalled being falsely arrested at the age of 21 after a chief of police planted narcotics in his hotel room, allegedly upset by his performance in a touring production of Hair. The charges were dropped after investigations were made and Ortega recalled the arrest report identifying him as George Berger, the name of the character he played in the show.

== Filmography and concerts ==
=== Film ===
Year	Title	Choreographer	Director	Producer	Rotten Tomatoes	Budget	Box office
1980	Xanadu	Yes	No	No	39%	$20 million	US$22.7 million
1982	One from the Heart	Yes	No	No	48%	$26 million	$0.6 million
1985	St. Elmo's Fire	Yes	No	No	47%	$10 million	$37.8 million
1986	Pretty in Pink	Yes	No	No	81%	$9 million	$40.4 million
1986	Ferris Bueller's Day Off	Yes	Second unit	No	79%	$6 million	$70.1 million
1987	Dirty Dancing	Yes	No	No	72%	$5 million	$213.9 million
1988	Salsa	Yes	Second unit	No	50%	$6 million	$8.8 million
1989	Shag	Yes	No	No	64%	$5 million	$6.9 million
1992	Newsies	Yes	Yes	No	30%	$15 million	$2.8 million
1993	Hocus Pocus	Yes	Yes	No	32%	$28 million	$39.5 million
1995	To Wong Foo, Thanks for Everything! Julie Newmar	Yes	No	No	42%	—N/a	$47.7 million
1998	Quest for Camelot	Yes	No	No	36%	$40 million	$22.5 million
2008	High School Musical 3: Senior Year	Yes	Yes	Executive	65%	$11 million	$252.9 million
2009	Michael Jackson's This Is It	Yes	Yes	Yes	81%	$60 million	$261.1 million
2017	A Change of Heart	No	Yes	No	—N/a	—N/a	—N/a

=== Television ===
Year	Title	Choreographer	Director	Producer	Notes
1988	Dirty Dancing	No	Yes	No	2 episodes
1990	Hull High	Yes	Yes	Executive	2 episodes
1996	Second Noah	No	Yes	No	1 episode
1998–1999	Chicago Hope	No	Yes	No	2 episodes
2000	Resurrection Blvd.	No	Yes	No	1 episode
2001	Grounded for Life	No	Yes	No	1 episode
2001–2002	Ally McBeal	No	Yes	No	3 episodes
2002–2006	Gilmore Girls	No	Yes	No	11 episodes
2006	High School Musical	Yes	Yes	No	Television movie
2006	The Cheetah Girls 2	Yes	Yes	No	Television movie
2007	High School Musical 2	Yes	Yes	Yes	Television movie
2011	Phineas and Ferb	No	No	No	1 Episode; Cameo as Himself
2012	Bunheads	No	Yes	No	1 episode
2015	Descendants	Yes	Yes	Executive	Television movie
2016	Crazy Ex-Girlfriend	No	Yes	No	1 episode
2016	The Rocky Horror Picture Show: Let's Do the Time Warp Again	Yes	Yes	No	Television movie
2017	Descendants 2	Yes	Yes	Executive	Television movie
2018	Andi Mack	No	Yes	No	1 episode
2018	Hocus Pocus 25th Anniversary Halloween Bash	No	No	Executive	Television special
2019	Descendants 3	Yes	Yes	Executive	Television movie
2020	Julie and the Phantoms	Yes	Yes	Executive	Netflix series
2026	Lego Friends: Heartlake the Musical	No	No	Executive	Television movie Also writer of the story

=== Concerts ===
Year	Title	Choreographer	Director	Producer	Notes
1989–1990	Cher's Heart of Stone Tour	No	Yes	No	
1991–1992	Gloria Estefan's Into The Light World Tour	Yes	No	No	
1992–1993	Michael Jackson's Dangerous World Tour	No	Yes	No	
1996–1997	Gloria Estefan's Evolution World Tour	Yes	No	No	
1996–1997	Michael Jackson's HIStory World Tour	No	Yes	No	
2003	Gloria Estefan's Live & Unwrapped	Yes	Yes	No	
2004	Gloria Estefan's Live & Re-Wrapped Tour	Yes	No	No	
2006	The Boy from Oz	Yes	Yes	No	Australian arena tour
2006–2007	High School Musical: The Concert	No	Yes	Yes	
2007–2008	Hannah Montana & Miley Cyrus: Best of Both Worlds Tour	Yes	Yes	No	
2009–2010 (cancelled)	Michael Jackson's This Is It	Yes	Yes	No	

== Awards and nominations ==
Year	Association	Category	Work / nominee	Result	Ref.
2001	Primetime Emmy Award	Outstanding Choreography	Grounded for Life	Nominated	
2002	Primetime Emmy Award	Outstanding Choreography (shared with Doug Jack and Sarah Kawahara)	Opening Ceremony Salt Lake 2002 Olympic Winter Games	Won	
2002	Primetime Emmy Award	Outstanding Directing for a Variety Series (shared with Bucky Gunts and Ron de Moraes)	Opening Ceremony Salt Lake 2002 Olympic Winter Games	Won	
2006	Directors Guild of America Awards	Outstanding Directing – Children's Programs	High School Musical	Won	
2006	Primetime Emmy Award	Outstanding Choreography (shared with Charles Klapow and Bonnie Story)	High School Musical	Won	
2006	Primetime Emmy Award	Outstanding Directing for a Miniseries, Movie, or a Special	High School Musical	Nominated	
2007	Directors Guild of America Awards	Outstanding Directing – Children's Programs	High School Musical 2	Nominated	
2007	Helpmann Awards	Best Choreography in a Musical (shared with Kelley Abbey)	The Boy from Oz	Won	
2008	ALMA Award	Outstanding Director of a Made-for-TV Movie	High School Musical 2	Won	
2008	Primetime Emmy Award	Outstanding Choreography (shared with Charles Klapow and Bonnie Story)	High School Musical 2	Nominated	
2009	National Association of Latino Independent Producers	Outstanding Achievement Award	Kenny Ortega	Won	
2009	Young Artist Award	Jackie Coogan Award – Contribution to Youth	High School Musical	Won	
2015	Directors Guild of America Awards	Outstanding Directing – Children's Programs	Descendants	Won	
