= Dirty Dancing: Havana Nights =

2004 American musical romance film directed by Guy Ferland

- Theatrical release poster
- Directed by: Guy Ferland
- Screenplay by: Victoria Arch; Boaz Yakin
- Story by: Kate Gunzinger; Peter Sagal
- Produced by: Lawrence Bender; Sarah Green
- Starring: Diego Luna; Romola Garai; Sela Ward; John Slattery; Jonathan Jackson; January Jones; Mika Boorem; Patrick Swayze
- Cinematography: Anthony B. Richmond
- Edited by: Luis Colina; Scott Richter
- Music by: Heitor Pereira
- Production companies: Artisan Entertainment; Miramax Films; A Band Apart; Havana Nights LLC; Lawrence Bender Productions
- Distributed by: Lions Gate Films (United States); Miramax International (international)
- Release date: February 27, 2004
- Running time: 86 minutes
- Country: United States
- Languages: English; Spanish
- Budget: $25 million
- Box office: $27.6 million

Dirty Dancing: Havana Nights is a 2004 American musical romance film directed by Guy Ferland and starring Diego Luna, Romola Garai, Sela Ward, John Slattery, Jonathan Jackson, January Jones, Mika Boorem and Patrick Swayze.

The film is a standalone prequel of the 1987 blockbuster Dirty Dancing, and serves as the second feature film in the titular franchise. While the movie follows a similar plot structure, the story takes place in Cuba during the Cuban Revolution. Patrick Swayze, star of the original film, appears as a dance instructor.

== Plot ==
In 1958, Katey Miller, her parents and her sister Susie arrive in Cuba during the Cuban revolution. A bookworm, Katey is not very happy about having to move to a different country during her senior year of high school, as she had planned on attending Radcliffe College, although the rest of her family seem extremely pleased to be there.

Meeting several other wealthy American teens by the pool—including James Phelps, the son of her father's boss—Katey becomes disgusted when one of the others insults a local waiter when he drops their drinks, as it was really Katey's fault. She attempts to talk to the waiter—Javier, who works at the hotel to support his family—because she feels awful about what happened, but he is uninterested.

Katey watches a film of her parents dancing and wishes she could dance as well as them. Her father dances with her a bit. The next day in class, Katey is asked to read aloud from the Odyssey—a passage about love and passion. After class, James invites her to a party at the country club the next day.

While walking home from school, Katey sees Javier dancing, and he offers to walk her home. They stop to listen to a street band and police show up, stopping him while she runs away.

The next day, Katey tries some of the dance moves she saw. Javier sees her and invites her to see the real dancers on Saturday night, but she mentions her invitation to the country club. Upset, he leaves. Katey wears one of her maid's dresses to the country club party, impressing James. She later convinces him to take her to the Cuban nightclub La Rosa Negra, where Javier is dancing.

Javier dances with Katey while James sits at the bar. Soon he is accosted by Javier's brother Carlos, who tells him they will eventually kick Americans out of Cuba. Javier comes over and argues with his brother. James takes Katey back to the car and assaults her when she refuses to kiss him. She slaps him and runs into the club, so Javier walks her home.

The next day, Katey walks by a dance class. The teacher asks if anyone wants to enter the big dance contest and then dances with Katey for a bit. She grabs a flyer for the competition.

While walking to the pool, James apologizes to Katey and then tells her that Susie saw Javier with her and got him fired. Katey chews out her sister, then goes to find Javier, who is now working at a chop shop with Carlos. She asks him to enter the dance contest with her, but he refuses. Meanwhile, it has become apparent that Carlos is helping the revolutionaries.

The next day, Javier shows up at Katey's school and agrees to enter the dance contest with her. They start teaching each other dance moves and Javier convinces her to "feel the music." They practice constantly, and Katey dances more with the dance teacher, until it is the night of the dance. Katey and Javier compete with the other couples and are chosen to go on to the next round.

Katey's parents disapprove of her relationship with Javier, but Katey reconciles with them. On the night of the contest's final round, while Katey and Javier are on the dance floor, Javier sees his brother and some revolutionaries disguised as waiters, and there is a police raid.

The contest stops as everyone flees the club, and Javier has to save Carlos from the police. The brothers talk about how they miss their dad, then they hear that Batista has fled the country, so join the celebration.

Later, Javier comes to the hotel to find Katey, they go to the beach and have sex. The next day, Katey's parents tell her they are leaving Cuba, so she has one last night with Javier. They go to La Rosa Negra, where they are dubbed King and Queen.

Katey's family is there to see her, and Katey narrates that she does not know when she will see Javier again, but this will not be their last time dancing together.

== Cast ==
- Romola Garai as Katey Miller
- Diego Luna as Javier Suarez
- Sela Ward as Jeannie Miller
- John Slattery as Bert Miller
- Mika Boorem as Susie Miller
- Jonathan Jackson as James Phelps
- Rene Lavan as Carlos Suarez
- Patrick Swayze as Dance Class Instructor
- January Jones as Eve
- Mýa Harrison as Lola Martinez
- Angélica Aragón as Mrs. Suarez
- Kaly Cordova as Dancer
- Heather Headley as Rosa Negra Singer

== Production ==
Havana Nights is based on an original screenplay by playwright and NPR host Peter Sagal, based on the real life experience of producer JoAnn Jansen, who lived in Cuba as a 15-year-old in 1958–59. Sagal wrote the screenplay, which he titled Cuba Mine, about a young American woman who witnessed the Cuban Revolution and had a romance with a young Cuban revolutionary. The screenplay was to be a serious political romance story, documenting, among other stories, how the Cuban Revolution transformed from idealism to terror.

It was commissioned in 1992 by Lawrence Bender, who was rising to fame with his production of Quentin Tarantino's Reservoir Dogs and Pulp Fiction. The screenplay was bought by a film studio, which requested several rewrites before deciding not to produce the film. A decade later, Bender decided to make a Dirty Dancing sequel, and the film was very loosely adapted from Sagal's script. Not a single line from Sagal's original screenplay appears in the final film and Sagal says that the only remnants of the political theme that existed in his script is a scene wherein some people are executed.

Natalie Portman was offered the role of Katey Miller but she turned it down. Ricky Martin was also considered for the role of Javier Suarez. The film was British actress Romola Garai's first Hollywood film and she repeatedly has cited the filming of the movie as being an extremely negative experience which caused her to re-evaluate working in Hollywood. In a 2004 interview with The Telegraph she explained that the filmmakers "were obsessed with having someone skinny. I just thought, why didn't they get someone like Kate Bosworth, if that's what they wanted?"

=== Distribution ===
The film was announced as a co-production between Artisan Entertainment and Miramax Films on May 12, 2000. Lions Gate Films, which acquired Artisan in December 2003, would handle domestic distribution, while Miramax through Buena Vista International would handle overseas distribution.

=== Sexual misconduct by Harvey Weinstein ===
In October 2017, in the midst of producer Harvey Weinstein's sexual abuse allegations in Hollywood, Garai later revealed that Weinstein, whose company Miramax was co-producing the film, had required her to meet him alone in a hotel room while he was wearing only a bathrobe to obtain the part: "I had to go to his hotel room in the Savoy, and he answered the door in his bathrobe. I was only 18. I felt violated by it, it has stayed very clearly in my memory."

== Reception ==
On the review aggregator website Rotten Tomatoes, 23% of 107 critics' reviews are positive, with an average rating of 4.3/10. The website's consensus reads: "Cheesy, unnecessary remake." Metacritic, which uses a weighted average, assigned the film a score of 39 out of 100, based on 32 critics, indicating "generally unfavorable" reviews.

Robert Denerstein of the Rocky Mountain News gave it a D+, saying: "Tries to add Cuban flavor to a familiar plot but comes up with nothing more than a bubbling stew of cliches." Peter Howell of the Toronto Star thought it to be "Charmless, clumsy and culturally offensive all at the same time" and merited it one out of five stars.

Wesley Morris of The Boston Globe rated it two out of four stars and called the movie "as square as a sock hop." Philip Martin of the Arkansas Democrat-Gazette, who rated it B−, because "aside from the triteness of the dialogue, the mathematical predictability of the script and the muddling of numbskulled politics, DD: HN is a fairly enjoyable experience." According to Louis Hobson of Jam! Magazine, who thought the movie was worth three and a half out of five stars, the main redeeming factor was the choreography: "You may have problems with the obvious, clichéd story, but the dancing is incredible."

Philip Wuntch of The Dallas Morning News gave the film a C, stating that "both the dance numbers and the personal drama are largely listless."

== Soundtrack ==
Dirty Dancing: Havana Nights

Soundtrack album by Various Artists
- Released: February 17, 2004
- Genre: Pop / R&B
- Label: J Records

1. "Dance Like This" – Wyclef Jean featuring Claudette Ortiz
2. "Dirty Dancing" – The Black Eyed Peas
3. "Guajira (I Love U 2 Much)" – Yerba Buena
4. "Can I Walk By" – Jazze Pha featuring Monica
5. "Satellite (From "Havana Nights")" – Santana featuring Jorge Moreno
6. "El Beso Del Final" – Christina Aguilera
7. "Represent, Cuba" – Orishas featuring Heather Headley
8. "Do You Only Wanna Dance" – Mýa
9. "You Send Me" – Shawn Kane
10. "El Estuche" – Aterciopelados
11. "Do You Only Wanna Dance" – Julio Daivel Big Band (conducted by Cucco Peña)
12. "Satellite (Spanish Version) Nave Espacial (From "Havana Nights")" – Santana featuring Jorge Moreno
