= Trevor Einhorn =

American actor

- Born: Trevor Elias Einhorn; November 3, 1988 (age 37); Los Angeles, California, U.S.
- Occupation: Actor
- Years active: 1994–present
- Spouse: Alyx Andrushuk

Trevor Elias Einhorn (born November 3, 1988) is an American actor. In television, he is known for playing Josh on Syfy's fantasy series The Magicians and Frederick Crane on the American sitcom Frasier.

== Career ==
Einhorn was a child actor and landed his first big role as recurring character Frederick Crane on Frasier.

He made an appearance in an episode of The Office as Justin Polznik, a student interested in an internship at Dunder Mifflin. He also guested as a young sex-driven patient of Berg's in Two Guys and a Girl. In the movie BASEketball he played the role of Joey Thomas. He also played the role of Henry Walker on Sons & Daughters.

Einhorn appeared with Kiefer Sutherland in the "Dynamite Cupcakes" television commercial for Acer laptops. He appeared in the sixth and seventh seasons of Mad Men, as copywriter John Mathis. Other recent work includes reprising ’Neil Kellerman’ in the ABC remake of the film Dirty Dancing.

Einhorn also co-starred in The Magicians, based on the eponymous book series by Lev Grossman, as Josh Hoberman.

== Filmography ==
=== Film ===
Year	Title	Role	Notes
1994	Disclosure	Matt Sanders	
1998	BASEketball	Joey Thomas	
1998	Operation Splitsville	Arthur	
1999	The Storyteller	Jonah	Short
2016	Roommates	Ben	Short; completed

=== Television ===
Year	Title	Role	Notes
1996	Deadly Games	Billy	Episode: "Dr. Kramer"
1996	MADtv	Brother	Episode 01x19
1999	Two Guys and a Girl	Robbie	Episode: "Two Guys, a Girl and Ashley's Return"
2000	The Norm Show	Maurice	Episode: "Norm vs. the Kid"
1996–2003	Frasier	Frederick Crane	Recurring; 8 episodes
2004	Joan of Arcadia	Mascot God	3 episodes
2006	Help Me Help You	Max	Episode: "Fun Run"
2006–2007	Sons & Daughters	Henry Walker	Main character
2008	The Office	Justin Polznik	Episode: "Job Fair"
2013	Arrested Development	Josh Abramson	Episode: "Colony Collapse"
2014	Garfunkel and Oates	Graham	Episode: "Eggs"
2014	Major Crimes	Danny Riggs	Episode: "Acting Out"
2013–2015	Mad Men	John Mathis	Recurring; 13 episodes
2015	Maron	Barry	Episode: "Spiral"
2015	#Cybriety	Dan Miller	Episode: "Neighbor Ellen"; web series
2016	Underachievers	Suit	TV short
2017	Dirty Dancing	Neil Kellerman	TV movie
2017	The Last Tycoon	Martin Ringler	Episode: "An Enemy Among Us"
2016–2020	The Magicians	Josh Hoberman/Alternate Josh	Guest (season 1); recurring (season 2); main (seasons 3–5)
2024	Curb Your Enthusiasm	Waylan	Episode: "The Dream Scheme"
