= Dirty Dancing: The Time of Your Life =

- Genre: Reality TV/Talent contest
- Starring: Kelly Brook (presenter); Miranda Garrison (judge); Jennifer Ellison (judge); Sean Cheesman (judge)
- Country of origin: United Kingdom
- Original language: English

Production
- Production locations: Virginia, USA
- Camera setup: Multiple-camera setup
- Production company: Granada Productions

Original release
- Network: Living
- Release: October 2007 – 2008

Dirty Dancing: The Time of Your Life is a dance show commissioned for Living as a tribute to Dirty Dancing's 20th anniversary in 2007. Due to the success of the show, a second series was shown in 2008.

== Plot ==
Sixteen dancers (twenty in series 2) from all over Britain compete for a dance contract with Los Angeles-based dance agency BLOC. The couples will stay at the Mountain Lake resort in Virginia. Each week they perform a dance in front of guests from the mountain lake resort and the judges. Each week the dancers pick a partner

and perform a dance chosen by the judges. The judges then deliberate and choose that week's best couple and worst couple. The worst couple is then sent home.

== Series 1 ==
The judging panel for the first series consisted of three people:

- Miranda Garrison, Co-choreographer of the movie. She also starred as Vivian in the movie.
- Sean Cheesman, Top choreographer.
- Jennifer Ellison, Royal Ballet trained dancer and actress.

=== Contestants ===
- Amy Boyes & Jordan Darrell - Winners
- Alex Bryon & Jamie Karitzis - Runner up
- Jennifer Walsh & Andrew Stone - 8th
- Carly Baker & Kenny Solomons - 7th
- Sophia Hooper & David Lyons - 6th
- Dean Wills & Lucy Emes - 5th
- Lydia Louisa & Adam Pedicini - 4th
- Candice Greatbanks & Nick Giligan - 3rd

The series was commissioned by Clare Hollywood, with Glen Middleham as executive producer, Andrew Robertson as series producer, and Ed Sayer as series editor.

== Series 2 ==
Dirty Dancing: The Time of Your Life, series 2 was shown during the later summer of 2008. Filming began at the Mountain Lake resort on 1 June 2008. The series first aired on Wednesday 10 September, with the final on Wednesday 19 November 2008. Miranda Garrison and Sean Cheesman returned to the panel of judges, along with model and actress Kelly Brook.

In the first episode the boys arrived at Mountain Lake resort first shortly followed by the girls. When they all meet they had a few drink and fun and got to know each other. The first dance off was girls vs boys, in which they had to learn a routine from Shaun and also include some free style. For the Challenge they participated in a talent contest where they were not allowed to dance, won by Kade singing 'Ain't That a Kick in the Head', giving him first pick at the partner. He was also given immunity from the weeks dance off. In second place was Caoife who sang live, giving her second pick and in third place was Emma who did a striptease while using a hula hoop.

=== Contestants ===
- James Collins & Pamela Smith - Winners
- Vincent Vianen & Caoife Coleman - Runner up
- Simon Campbell & Haley Monaghan - 3rd
- Alex Murdoch & Donna Gilkes - 4th
- Tobias Mead & Emma De Vees - 5th
- Ashley Goddard & Kade Ferrido - 6th
- Joel Hogan & Kirsty Bennie - 7th
- Chantelle Prince & Dean James - 8th
- Jamie Greasley & Natalia Spano - 9th
- Johnny Byrne & Rachel Simmons - 10th

Since moving to LA Pamela has featured as a Dancer for such artists as Lady Gaga, Usher, Toni Braxton, Janet Jackson and Katy Perry. Caoife Coleman features in music videos for dance act Ultrabeat. Ashley Goddard can be seen in the 5th episode of Skins series 3. Alex Murdoch has featured in an advert for the Peugeot 107 Verve and went on to be a contestant in the 7th X Factor series as part of F.Y.D. Tobias Mead was featured in the first season of Britains Got Talent on 17 April 2010 and got through to the next round after dancing. Vincent Vianen did the choreography for both seasons of the Dutch version of So You Think You Can Dance.
