= Barra Grant =

American actress

- Born: Barbara Carol Wayne; December 1947 (age 78); New York City, U.S.
- Education: Bryn Mawr College; Barnard College
- Occupations: Actress, director, screenwriter
- Spouse: Brian Reilly (m. 1982; died 2011)
- Mother: Bess Myerson
- Website: http://missamericasuglydaughter.com

Barra Grant (born Barbara Carol Wayne) is an American actress, screenwriter, film director and playwright.

== Biography ==
Grant was born Barbara Carol Wayne in New York City, the daughter of Allan Wayne, a doll company executive, and Bess Myerson, Miss America 1945. Her parents divorced in 1958 due to her father's abuse. She became Barra Grant when her mother married Arnold Grant and he adopted her in 1962. She was educated at the Birch Wathen Lenox School, Bryn Mawr College, and Barnard College. She also went to London for three years to study acting.

Grant began an acting career in the early 1970s, appearing on television and in film. One of her first roles was as Lulie in the BBC series Take Three Girls. While acting at The Mark Taper she was inspired to start writing. In 1978, she wrote and appeared in the film Slow Dancing in the Big City. She began her directing career with an episode of NBC Special Treat titled "The Tap Dance Kid", based on a novel by Louise Fitzhugh.

Grant was married to writer and producer Brian Reilly until his death in 2011.

== Filmography ==
=== Film ===
Year	Title	Director	Writer
1978	Slow Dancing in the Big City	No	Yes
1984	Misunderstood	No	Yes
2005	Life of the Party	Yes	Yes
2009	Love Hurts	Yes	Yes

Acting roles

Year	Title	Role
1972	Daughters of Satan	Chris Robertson
1972	It Ain't Easy	Ann
1976	Mother, Jugs & Speed	Miss Crocker
1978	Slow Dancing in the Big City	Mildred

=== Television ===
Year	Title	Director	Writer	Notes
1978	Special Treat	Yes	Yes	Episode "The Tap Dance Kid"
1987	CBS Summer Playhouse	No	Yes	Episode "Mabel and Max"
1989	Dirty Dancing	Yes	No	Episode "Hit the Road"
1990	The Earth Day Special	No	Yes	TV special
1991	CBS Schoolbreak Special	Yes	Yes	Episode "Lies of the Heart"
1992	Freshman Dorm	No	Yes	Episode "The Last Sonnet"
1994	Living Single	No	Yes	Episode "U.N.I.T.Y. (a.k.a. Five Card Stud)"; Also executive consultant of 7 episodes

Acting roles

Year	Title	Role	Notes
1971	Take Three Girls	Lulie	Main role
1971	Sarge	Christina	"A Terminal Case of Vengeance"
1972	The Mary Tyler Moore Show	Judy Conrad	"The Courtship of Mary's Father's Daughter"
1973	The Bold Ones: The New Doctors	Eve Tanner	"Tightrope to Tomorrow"
1973	Love, American Style	Boni	"Love and the Baby Derby"
1973	Gunsmoke	Teresa	"The Widowmaker"
1973	Barnaby Jones	Marie Hubble	"Stand-In for Death"
1974	Trapped Beneath the Sea	Grace Wallants	ABC Movie of the Week
1974	Roll, Freddy, Roll!	Sidni Kane	ABC Movie of the Week
1975	Let's Switch!	Morgan Ames	ABC Movie of the Week
1976	Good Heavens	Kiki	"Coffee, Tea, or Gloria"
1976	Serpico	Marilyn	"The Country Boy"
1977	The Sunshine Boys	Sylvia Grant	TV film
1978	Sergeant Matlovich vs. the U.S. Air Force	Susan Hewman	TV film

== Stage plays ==
- A Mother, a Daughter and a Gun (2006).
- Miss America's Ugly Daughter, about her relationship to her mother, first performed on July 14, 2018, at The Edye, Santa Monica, California.
