= Chain Reaction (band) =

1960s American rock band

- Origin: New York, U.S.
- Genres: Garage rock, psychedelic rock, hard rock
- Years active: 1964–1968
- Labels: Date Records, Verve Records
- Past members: Don Solomon; Peter Stahl; Alan Strohmayer; Steven Tallarico; Barry Shapiro

Chain Reaction, also known as The Strangeurs, was an American rock band from Yonkers, New York. They had two singles and were most notable for having lead singer Steven Tallarico (later known as Steven Tyler). They started off as The Strangers, until finding a group who already had that name, switching to The Strangeurs as a result. After a lineup change they changed their name to Chain Reaction.

Chain Reaction performed in concert as the opening act for such groups as the Beach Boys, the Byrds and the Yardbirds. The band's 1966 song "When I Needed You" appeared on Aerosmith's 1991 compilation box set Pandora's Box.

== The Strangeurs lineup ==
- Steven Tallarico – vocals
- Peter Stahl – guitar
- Alan Strohmayer – bass
- Don Solomon – keyboards/vocals
- Barry Shapiro – drums

== Chain Reaction lineup ==
- Steve Tyler (Steven Tallarico) – lead vocals, harmonica, percussion
- Peter Stahl – guitar
- Alan Strohmayer – bass
- Don Sloan (Don Solomon) – keyboards
- Barry Shore (Barry Shapiro) – drums

From Barry Shapiro (November 29, 2022): After Alan left the band, we hired Phil Salvagio as bass player. Phil stayed with the band for about 6 months then left. The band then hired Marvin Pataki as lead guitarist and Peter Stahl moved over to bass. This was the final lineup of the Chain Reaction.

== Singles ==
- "The Sun" / "When I Needed You" (B. Shapiro – S. Tallarico – D. Solomon – A. Strohmayer – P. Stahl) 1966
- "You Should Have Been Here Yesterday" / "Ever Lovin' Man" (Don Sloan – Peter Stahl) 1968
