= Allison Shearmur =

American film producer (1963–2018)

- Born: Allison Ivy Brecker; October 23, 1963; New York City, New York
- Died: January 19, 2018 (aged 54); Los Angeles, California
- Other name: Alli Shearmur
- Occupations: Film executive, producer
- Years active: 1994–2018
- Spouse: Edward Shearmur
- Children: 2

Allison Ivy Shearmur (also known as Alli Shearmur; née Brecker; October 23, 1963 – January 19, 2018) was an American film executive and producer.

Working for companies including Walt Disney Studios, Universal Pictures, Paramount Pictures and Lionsgate, her production work involved such films as the American Pie and Jason Bourne franchises, The Hunger Games films, the live-action remake of Cinderella, as well as the Star Wars anthology films Rogue One and Solo.

== Formative years and family life ==
Allison Ivy Brecker was one of the quadruplets born to Martin and Rhoda Brecker on October 23, 1963. She grew up in a traditional Jewish household, and attended the University of Pennsylvania Law School. After completing her Juris Doctor at the USC Gould School of Law, she became a member of the State Bar of California. While at university, she entered a campus contest and won first prize, lunch with Stanley Jaffe, an executive at Columbia Pictures. Jaffe became a lifelong mentor and role model for Shearmur.

She married film composer Edward Shearmur, with whom she had two children. In 2014, the Shearmurs had a house featured in House Beautiful.

== Career ==
After graduation, Allison Shearmur participated in a young executive management initiative, and was subsequently selected to become a manager in the comedy development department at Columbia TriStar. She worked at Disney as a vice-president between 1994 and 1997, where she worked on movies including George of the Jungle. She then joined Universal as an executive vice-president of production, and worked on Along Came Polly, Erin Brockovich and the American Pie and Bourne series.

Shearmur also worked for two years at Paramount as co-president of production, where she was responsible for the studio's literary productions such as The Curious Case of Benjamin Button, The Spiderwick Chronicles, Stop-Loss, Zodiac, Dreamgirls, Charlotte's Web, Nacho Libre, and Failure to Launch. In 2008, she moved to Lionsgate as president of motion picture production. While at Lionsgate she produced the first two Hunger Games movies, then executive produced the final two.

Shearmur formed her own production company, Allison Shearmur Productions. In 2017, her company executive produced the television movie Dirty Dancing.

== Illness and death ==
Allison Shearmur developed lung cancer and died from the disease at the age of fifty-four on January 19, 2018, at Ronald Reagan UCLA Medical Center in Los Angeles. The films Solo: A Star Wars Story, The One and Only Ivan and Chaos Walking were dedicated to her memory.

== Filmography ==
Year	Title	Role	Notes
2008	Stop-Loss	Executive producer	
2011	Abduction	Executive producer	
2012	The Hunger Games	President of production	
2012	What to Expect When You're Expecting	Executive producer	
2013	The Hunger Games: Catching Fire	Executive producer	
2014	The Hunger Games: Mockingjay – Part 1	Executive producer	
2015	Cinderella	Producer	
2015	The Clan of the Cave Bear	Executive producer	
2015	A Tale of Love and Darkness	Executive producer	
2015	The Hunger Games: Mockingjay – Part 2	Executive producer	
2016	Pride and Prejudice and Zombies	Producer	
2016	Nerve	Producer	
2016	Rogue One: A Star Wars Story	Producer	
2017	Power Rangers	Executive producer	
2017	Dirty Dancing	Executive producer	
2018	Solo: A Star Wars Story	Producer	Posthumous release
2020	The One and Only Ivan	Producer	Posthumous release
2021	Chaos Walking	Producer	Posthumous release
