= Dirty Dancing (2017 film) =

- Based on: Dirty Dancing by Eleanor Bergstein
- Written by: Jessica Sharzer
- Directed by: Wayne Blair
- Starring: Nicole Scherzinger; Abigail Breslin; Colt Prattes; Debra Messing; Bruce Greenwood; Sarah Hyland; Tony Roberts
- Country of origin: United States

Production
- Executive producer: Allison Shearmur
- Producers: Stephen Meinen; Judy Cairo; Bill Hill; Adam Anders
- Cinematography: John Lindley
- Editor: Michael P. Shawver
- Running time: 130 minutes
- Production companies: Allison Shearmur Productions; Lionsgate Television

Original release
- Network: ABC
- Release: May 24, 2017

Dirty Dancing is a 2017 American television film directed by Wayne Blair and written by Jessica Sharzer. It is a made-for-TV musical remake of the 1987 film of the same name, and serves as the third installment overall in the titular franchise. The film stars Abigail Breslin, Colt Prattes, Debra Messing, Bruce Greenwood, Sarah Hyland, Nicole Scherzinger and Tony Roberts. It aired on May 24, 2017, on ABC. In its original broadcast, the film was seen by 6.61 million viewers with a 1.4 Nielsen rating in the 18-49 age demographic and a 5 share.

It received mixed to negative reviews from a majority of critics, and Nicole Scherzinger's performance was the only one to receive high praise.

== Plot ==
The opening scene takes place in New York City 1975, with a grown-up Frances saying how she never forgot her relationship with Johnny. In late summer 1963, affluent, college-bound Frances visits Kellerman's resort with her family and falls in love with working-class dance instructor Johnny Castle. The film closely follows the plot of the original film; although there are notable changes:

- Baby plans to study medicine, rather than economics.
- The role of Marjorie Houseman is significantly expanded. Feeling alienated by Jake's lack of attention and affection, despite her active efforts to engage him, Marjorie contacts a divorce lawyer and suggests she and Jake live apart. As Kellerman's is where Marjorie and Jake met and fell in love, Jake romances Marjorie and they have sex, reconciling.
- The role of Vivian Pressman is also expanded; now a divorcee who visits Kellerman's alone, she tells Marjorie of her intense loneliness at night. When Johnny is accused of theft, the stolen property is no longer Vivian's former husband's wallet, but instead his watch, which Johnny earlier rejected as a gift and which Vivian apparently planted among his belongings.
- Lisa rejects Robbie much earlier in the film. She befriends a new character, Marco, the resort's African-American pianist. Over his boss Tito's objections, Marco teaches Lisa to play the ukulele and performs with her in the talent show. Tito and Max acknowledge that the world is changing for the better.

A frame story is added. In 1975, Frances attends "Dirty Dancing", a Broadway show choreographed by Johnny and inspired by a book Frances wrote. Frances' faith in Johnny gave him the confidence to pursue a career. Frances is married and has a daughter. Frances takes a weekly dance lesson; she and Johnny encourage each other to continue dancing.

== Cast ==
- Abigail Breslin as Frances "Baby" Houseman
- Colt Prattes as Johnny Castle
- Nicole Scherzinger as Penny
- Sarah Hyland as Lisa Houseman
- Tony Roberts as Max Kellerman
- J. Quinton Johnson as Marco
- Shane Harper as Robbie Gould
- Trevor Einhorn as Neil Kellerman
- Beau Casper Smart as Billy Kostecki
- Katey Sagal as Vivian Pressman
- Billy Dee Williams as Tito Suarez
- Bruce Greenwood as Dr. Jake Houseman
- Debra Messing as Marjorie Houseman

== Production ==
In January 2011, Lionsgate announced that Kenny Ortega, the choreographer of the 1987 film Dirty Dancing, would direct its remake; however, the project was shelved the following year. In December 2015, ABC and Lionsgate Television announced a three-hour remake of the movie which will not be live and would be in the same vein as The Rocky Horror Picture Show: Let's Do the Time Warp Again, a remake of the 1975 film of the same name. The remake was directed by Wayne Blair and the screenplay was written by Jessica Sharzer. Allison Shearmur was attached to the project as executive producer.

=== Casting ===
Abigail Breslin had been officially attached as Baby, while the studio would green-light the project after further casting; this role was originally played by Jennifer Grey. In January 2016, ABC officially green-lit the project after Debra Messing was cast as Baby's mother. The following month, after a lengthy audition process, dancer Colt Prattes was announced as Johnny, the role originally played by Patrick Swayze. In March 2016, it was announced that Nicole Scherzinger would co-star as Penny, Johnny's dance partner, alongside Sarah Hyland as Lisa Houseman, Baby's sister, and Bruce Greenwood as Dr. Jake Houseman, Baby's father. Billy Dee Williams as Tito, the band leader, Shane Harper as Robbie, joined the cast of the movie alongside Beau “Casper” Smart and J. Quinton Johnson. Later that month, Trevor Einhorn was tapped to play Neil Kellerman. In April 2016, Katey Sagal and Tony Roberts were respectively cast as Vivian Pressman and Max Kellerman.

=== Filming ===
Filming was based in Hendersonville, North Carolina. Most of the filming locations were across western North Carolina including Hendersonville Asheville, Cashiers and Saluda, with filming taking place in April and May 2016. People living in the Hendersonville area served as crew members, extras and dancers, and they were invited to provide cars from the 1960s. Much of the filming took place at High Hampton Inn in Cashiers, as well as Kanuga Conference Center in Hendersonville. It created an estimated 1,225 jobs, including 900 extras, 30 cast members and 225 crew positions to support the project.

== Marketing ==
The official poster was unveiled in March 2017, and features Breslin and Prattes in an embrace from their final dance in the movie. A 30-second teaser trailer was released a month before the television movie's release.

== Soundtrack ==
Dirty Dancing: Original Television Soundtrack

Soundtrack album by Various artists
- Released: May 19, 2017
- Length: 50:28
- Labels: Virgin; Deepwell

Dirty Dancing: Original Television Soundtrack
No.	Title	Performer(s)	Length
1.	"Be My Baby"	Bea Miller	2:44
2.	"Big Girls Don't Cry"	Karmin	2:20
3.	"Love Man"	J. Quinton Johnson	2:19
4.	"Do You Love Me"	Colt Prattes, Nicole Scherzinger & Johnson	2:45
5.	"Fever"	Katey Sagal & Prattes	3:21
6.	"When I’m Alone"	Johnson	2:44
7.	"Wipe Out"	American Authors featuring Lindsey Stirling	2:31
8.	"Hungry Eyes"	Greyson Chance	3:42
9.	"Hey Baby"	Lady Antebellum	2:24
10.	"Whole Lotta Shakin' Goin' On"	Scherzinger & Abigail Breslin	3:07
11.	"Cry To Me"	Seal	2:50
12.	"They Can't Take That Away From Me"	Debra Messing	2:29
13.	"Love Is Strange"	Breslin & Prattes	3:01
14.	"They Can’t Take That Away (Reprise)"	Bruce Greenwood	2:00
15.	"She's Like the Wind"	Calum Scott	3:25
16.	"Don’t Think Twice It’s Alright"	Sarah Hyland & Johnson	3:39
17.	"(I've Had) The Time of My Life"	The Cast of Dirty Dancing featuring Prattes, Breslin, Johnson, Scherzinger, Messing & Greenwood	5:07
Total length:			50:28

== Reception ==
=== Critical reception ===
On Rotten Tomatoes, the film has an approval rating of 19% based on 21 reviews, with an average rating of 3.9/10. The critical consensus reads: "Clever casting can't save Dirty Dancing, a hollow remake that trips over its own good intentions." On Metacritic, the film was given a score of 39 out of 100 based on 16 critics, indicating "generally unfavorable" reviews.

Kimberly Roots of TVLine gave Dirty Dancing a D, stating: "By adding unnecessary elements and turning Dirty Dancing into a musical, ABC proves that it wouldn't know what made the original film special if it hit them in the pachanga."

Mae Abdulbaki of theyoungfolks.com gave Dirty Dancing a 3 (out of 10), stating "Remaking one of the most popular and beloved movies in the history of cinema feels almost disrespectful on many levels. Going into the TV movie remake of Dirty Dancing with a clear and open mind, I figured that if at least the dancing was good, then there was something to enjoy. However, the updated version doesn't even meet the lowest of expectations and blows past mediocre to land at downright terrible. The film is slow and dull, the lead actors have absolutely no chemistry, and the musical aspect doesn't add anything to the film."

Sonia Saraiya of Variety stated in her negative review: "An ill-conceived remake of the 1987 film retains none of the passion, skill, or fun of the original."

=== Viewership ===
Dirty Dancing averaged a 1.3 rating in adults 18-49 and 6.6 million viewers, airing from 8 p.m. to 11 p.m. The remake gave ABC its most-watched Wednesday in nearly seven months, but was also considered to be a disappointment in the ratings and lost the evening to the CBS season finale of Survivor.
