= Dirty Dancing (1988 TV series) =

- Based on: Dirty Dancing
- Developed by: Robert Rabinowitz; Barra Grant
- Starring: Melora Hardin; Patrick Cassidy; Paul Feig; Mandy Ingber; Constance Marie; Charlie Stratton; John Wesley; McLean Stevenson
- Opening theme: "(I've Had) The Time of My Life" by Bill Medley and Jennifer Warnes
- Country of origin: United States
- Original language: English
- No. of seasons: 1
- No. of episodes: 12 (1 unaired)

Production
- Producers: Robert Lovenheim; Steve Tisch
- Running time: 30 minutes
- Production companies: The Steve Tisch Company; Vestron Television

Original release
- Network: CBS
- Release: October 29, 1988 – January 14, 1989

Related
- Dirty Dancing (film)

Dirty Dancing is an American comedy-drama television series that ran for 11 episodes on CBS from October 29, 1988, until January 14, 1989. It was based on the 1987 film of the same name, and is the second release in the titular franchise. Despite its sourced original story, none of the original cast or crew returned for the TV adaptation. The series starred Patrick Cassidy as Johnny Castle and Melora Hardin as Frances "Baby" Kellerman.

== Plot ==
The television series followed the same basic premise of the film, with a few variations. The series was still set at Kellerman's during the summer of 1963, but instead of being the daughter of a resort guest, Baby became the daughter of Max Kellerman (in the film, Baby's last name was Houseman), and was put in charge of Johnny as Kellerman's talent director. Much like the movie, Baby noted that she intended to attend Mount Holyoke in the fall, so it was not clear how the series would continue once the summer ended. As was the case in the film, Baby and Johnny had an adversarial relationship, but eventually came to respect each other. As this was a weekly series, Baby and Johnny did not fall in love immediately, but as the series progressed, their feelings grew.

== Cast ==
- Melora Hardin as Frances "Baby" Kellerman (in the film, Baby's last name is Houseman)
- Patrick Cassidy as Johnny Castle
- Constance Marie as Penny Rivera (in the film, Penny's last name is Johnson)
- McLean Stevenson as Max Kellerman
- Charlie Stratton as Neil Mumford (in the film, Neil's last name is Kellerman)
- Paul Feig as Norman Bryant
- John Wesley as Sweets Walker
- Adam S. Bristol as Wallace Kahn
- Amanda Ingber as Robin, Baby's cousin

== Episodes ==
No.	Title	Directed by	Written by	Original release date	U.S. viewers (millions)	Rating/share (households)
1	"Baby, It's You"	Tony Bill	Robert Rabinowitz & Barra Grant	October 29, 1988	14.5	9.8/18
2	"Heat Wave"	Michael Fresco	Susan Miller	November 5, 1988	12.9	8.5/15
3	"Save the Last Dance for Me"	Jan Eliasberg	Jan Worthington	November 12, 1988	11.2	7.5/13
4	"Walk Like a Man"	Kenny Ortega	Virginia Browne	November 19, 1988	10.8	7.5/13
5	"Breaking Up Is Hard to Do"	Oz Scott	Susan Dworkin	December 3, 1988	10.0	6.8/12
6	"Poetry in Motion"	Ed Kaplan	Barra Grant	December 10, 1988	8.5	6.8/12
7	"Book of Love"	Michael Fresco	Susan Miller	December 27, 1988	8.1	6.0/10
8	"Book of Love"	Michael Fresco	Susan Miller	December 27, 1988	8.1	6.0/10
9	"Turn Me Loose"	Michael Peters	Story by : Evan Harrison; Teleplay by : Jan Worthington & Evan Harrison	December 31, 1988	9.2	6.5/13
10	"Our Day Will Come"	Steve Tisch	Christopher Ames & Carolyn Shelby	January 7, 1989	10.4	6.6/11
11	"Hit the Road"	Barra Grant	Barra Grant	January 14, 1989	7.5	5.0/9
12	"Don't Make Me Over"	Gabrielle Beaumont	Christopher Ames & Carolyn Shelby	Unaired	N/A	N/A
