= Dirty Dancer (Kingsland Road song) =

Single by Kingsland Road

from the album We Are the Young
- Released: 10 August 2014
- Recorded: 2014
- Genre: Pop
- Length: 3:19
- Label: Soundcheck
- Songwriter(s): Kingsland Road, Ollie Green

Kingsland Road singles chronology
"Dirty Dancer" (2014)	"Shoreline" (2015)

"Dirty Dancer" is the debut single by English boy band Kingsland Road. It combines the elements of indie pop, new wave, disco, and funk. It was released on 10 August 2014.

== Background and composition ==
In November 2013, Kingsland Road finished in ninth place on the tenth series of The X Factor. In June 2014, they announced that they would be funding their debut album through PledgeMusic and that it would be released in January 2015. In June, they announced details of their debut single "Dirty Dancer".

== Music video ==
The song's lyric video premiered on 27 June 2014. The official music video was released on 10 July 2014.

== Chart performance ==
"Dirty Dancer" entered the UK Singles Chart at number 85 on 17 August 2014.
