= Dirty Dancing =

1987 film directed by Emile Ardolino

- Theatrical release poster
- Directed by: Emile Ardolino
- Written by: Eleanor Bergstein
- Produced by: Linda Gottlieb
- Starring: Patrick Swayze; Jennifer Grey; Jerry Orbach; Cynthia Rhodes
- Cinematography: Jeffrey Jur
- Edited by: Peter C. Frank
- Music by: John Morris; Erich Bulling; Jon Barns
- Production company: Great American Films Limited Partnership
- Distributed by: Vestron Pictures
- Release dates: May 12, 1987 (Cannes); August 21, 1987 (United States)
- Running time: 100 minutes
- Country: United States
- Language: English
- Budget: $4.5 million
- Box office: $214 million

Dirty Dancing is a 1987 American romantic drama dance film written by Eleanor Bergstein, produced by Linda Gottlieb, and directed by Emile Ardolino. Starring Patrick Swayze and Jennifer Grey, it tells the story of Frances "Baby" Houseman (Grey), a young woman who falls in love with dance instructor Johnny Castle (Swayze) while vacationing at a Borscht Belt resort in 1963.

The film was based on screenwriter Bergstein's own childhood. She originally wrote a screenplay for the Michael Douglas 1980 film It's My Turn, but she ultimately ended up conceiving a story for a film which became Dirty Dancing. She finished the script in 1985, but management changes at Metro-Goldwyn-Mayer put the film in development hell. The production company was changed to Vestron Pictures with Emile Ardolino as director and Linda Gottlieb as producer. Filming took place in Lake Lure, North Carolina, and Mountain Lake, Virginia, with the film's score composed by John Morris and dance choreography by Kenny Ortega.

Dirty Dancing premiered at the Cannes Film Festival on May 12, 1987 and was released on August 21 in the United States, earning over $214 million worldwide—$64 million in the US and Canada and $150 million in other territories. It earned positive reviews from critics, who particularly praised the performances of Grey and Swayze, and its soundtrack, created by Jimmy Ienner, generated two multi-platinum albums, and multiple singles. "(I've Had) The Time of My Life", performed by Bill Medley and Jennifer Warnes, won the Academy Award for Best Original Song, the Golden Globe Award for Best Original Song, and the Grammy Award for Best Pop Performance by a Duo or Group with Vocals. In 2024, the film was selected for preservation in the United States National Film Registry by the Library of Congress as being "culturally, historically, or aesthetically significant".

The film's popularity successfully launched its titular franchise, including a 1988 television series, multiple reality competition shows, a 2004 prequel titled Dirty Dancing: Havana Nights, a stage production which has had sellout performances in multiple countries, a made-for-television musical adaptation in 2017, and an untitled sequel with Grey reprising her role.

== Plot ==
In the summer of 1963, teenager Frances "Baby" Houseman is vacationing with her family—cardiologist father Jake, mother Marge, and older sister Lisa—at Kellerman's, an upscale Catskills resort in the Borscht Belt owned by Jake's sarcastic best friend Max.

Exploring one night, Baby secretly observes Max instructing the waiters, all Ivy League students, to romance the guests' daughters, no matter how unattractive. Max also demeans the working-class entertainment staff, including Johnny Castle, one of the dance instructors.

Baby is attracted to Johnny and dances briefly with him after his kindhearted cousin, Billy, introduces them at a secret "dirty dancing" party for resort staff. She believes Johnny is romantically involved with his dance partner Penny, but Billy explains that the two are childhood friends and Johnny has always looked out for her. Max's grandson Neil flirts with Baby in the meantime.

Baby learns Penny is pregnant by Robbie Gould, a waiter and philanderer who attends the Yale School of Medicine and has turned his eye to Lisa. When Robbie refuses to help Penny, Baby borrows money from her father, without explaining why, to pay for Penny to have an abortion.

At first, Penny declines to accept the money for the abortion, as it would cause her and Johnny to miss a performance at a nearby resort, costing them the season's salary, but Baby volunteers to stand in for Penny. Johnny and Penny meet with Baby several times over the next few days to teach her the routine. Baby has difficulty learning the complex routine, initially frustrating Johnny. However, they develop a mutual attraction, and despite their failure to execute a climactic lift, Johnny and Baby's performance is successful.

Back at Kellerman's, Penny is badly injured by the shady abortion, so Baby enlists her father's help to stabilize Penny. Angered by Baby's deception, and assuming it was Johnny who got Penny pregnant, Dr. Houseman commands Baby to stay away from them.

Baby sneaks off to apologize to Johnny for her father's treatment, but Johnny feels he deserves it due to his lower status; Baby reassures him of his worth, declaring her love, and they spend the night together. They begin secretly seeing each other, and her father refuses to talk to her.

Scene from the dancing finale

Johnny rejects an indecent proposal by Vivian Pressman, an adulterous wife, who instead sleeps with Robbie, inadvertently foiling Lisa's plan to lose her virginity to him. When Vivian spots Baby leaving Johnny's cabin, she feels spurned and attempts revenge on Johnny by claiming he stole her husband's wallet.

Max is ready to fire Johnny, but Baby backs up his alibi, revealing she was with him the night of the theft. The real thieves, Sydney and Sylvia Schumacher, are caught, but he is still fired for his relationship with Baby. Baby is distraught, but Johnny is moved by her attempts to stand up for him.

Before leaving, Johnny tries to talk to Dr. Houseman but is accused of only trying to get at Baby. She later apologizes to her father for lying, but not for her romance with Johnny, and then accuses him of classism.

At the end-of-season talent show, Dr. Houseman gives Robbie a recommendation letter for medical school. However, when Robbie admits he got Penny pregnant, and then insults her and Baby, Dr. Houseman angrily grabs the letter back.

Johnny arrives and disrupts the final song by bringing Baby up on stage and declaring that she has made him a better person, and then they perform the dance they practiced all summer, ending with a successful climactic lift. Dr. Houseman admits he was wrong about Johnny and reconciles with Baby, and all the staff and guests join Baby and Johnny dancing to "(I've Had) The Time of My Life".

== Cast ==
- Jennifer Grey as Frances "Baby" Houseman
- Patrick Swayze as Johnny Castle
- Jerry Orbach as Jake Houseman
- Cynthia Rhodes as Penny Johnson
- Jack Weston as Max Kellerman
- Jane Brucker as Lisa Houseman
- Kelly Bishop as Marge Houseman
- Lonny Price as Neil Kellerman
- Max Cantor as Robbie Gould
- Charles "Honi" Coles as Tito Suarez
- Neal Jones as Billy Kostecki
- Wayne Knight as Stan
- Paula Trueman as Sylvia Schumacher
- Alvin Myerovich as Sydney Schumacher
- Miranda Garrison as Vivian Pressman
- Garry Goodrow as Moe Pressman

=== Cameos ===
- "Cousin Brucie" Morrow appears as a magician
  - Also as a DJ's voice in parts of the film
- Emile Ardolino
- Matthew Broderick (who was dating Grey at the time and co-starred with her in Ferris Bueller's Day Off)

== Production ==
=== Pre-production ===
Dirty Dancing is based in large part on screenwriter Eleanor Bergstein's own childhood: she is the younger daughter of a Jewish doctor from New York and had spent summers with her family in the Catskills at Grossinger's, where she participated in "Dirty Dancing" competitions; she was also nicknamed "Baby" herself as a girl. In 1980, Bergstein wrote a screenplay for the Michael Douglas film It's My Turn; however, the producers cut an erotic dancing scene from the script, prompting her to conceive a new story that took inspiration from her youth dance competitions. In 1984, she pitched the idea to Metro-Goldwyn-Mayer (MGM) executive Eileen Miselle, who liked it and teamed Bergstein with producer Linda Gottlieb. They set the film in 1963, with the character of Baby based on Bergstein's own life and the character of Johnny based on the stories of Michael Terrace, a dance instructor whom Bergstein met in the Catskills in 1985 while she was researching the story. She finished the script in November 1985, but management changes at MGM put the script into turnaround, or limbo.

Bergstein gave the script to other studios but was repeatedly rejected until she brought it to Vestron Pictures. While honing their pitch to Vestron, Gottlieb had agreed to cut the proposed budget in half. Bergstein and Gottlieb then chose Emile Ardolino as the film's director; Ardolino had never directed a feature film, but was extremely passionate about the project after reading the script while he was on jury duty. The team of Gottlieb, Bergstein, and Ardolino then presented their vision for the film to Vestron's president, Jon Peisinger, and the company's vice president for production, Mitchell Cannold. By the end of the meeting, Peisinger had greenlit the project to become Vestron's first feature film production. The approved film was budgeted at the relatively low amount of $5 million, at a time when the average cost for a film was $12 million.

For choreographer, Bergstein chose Kenny Ortega, who had been trained by Gene Kelly. For a location, they did not find anything suitable in the Catskills (as many of the Borscht Belt resorts had been shut down at that point), so they decided on a combination of two locations: Lake Lure, North Carolina, and the Mountain Lake Hotel near Pembroke, Virginia, and with careful editing made it look like all shooting was done in the same area.

=== Casting ===
Director Ardolino was adamant that they choose dancers, such as Swayze, who could also act, as he did not want to use the "stand-in" method that had been used with Flashdance (1983).

For the female lead of Frances "Baby" Houseman, Winona Ryder, Sarah Jessica Parker and Sharon Stone were considered. Bergstein chose the 26-year-old Jennifer Grey, daughter of the Oscar-winning actor and dancer Joel Grey (Cabaret (1972)). Grey was paid $50,000 (equivalent to $150,000 in 2025) for her role. The producers then sought a male lead, initially considering 20-year-old Billy Zane, though initial screen tests when he was partnered with Grey did not meet expectations. Val Kilmer and Benicio del Toro were also considered for Johnny. The next choice was 34-year-old Patrick Swayze, who appeared in Grandview, U.S.A. (1984) and had co-starred with Grey on Red Dawn (1984). He was a seasoned dancer, with experience from the Joffrey Ballet. The producers were thrilled with him, but his resume read "No dancing" after a knee injury. However, Swayze read the script, liked the multi-level character of Johnny, and took the part anyway. After this, Johnny's heritage was changed from being Italian to Irish. Grey was initially not happy about the choice, as she and Swayze had difficulty getting along on Red Dawn, but when they did their dancing screen test, the chemistry between them was obvious. Bergstein described it as "breathtaking". Other casting choices were Broadway actor Jerry Orbach as Dr. Jake Houseman, Baby's father; and Jane Brucker as Lisa Houseman, her older sister.

Bergstein, as the film's writer, also attempted to cast her friend, sex therapist Dr. Ruth Westheimer, to play Mrs. Schumacher (and Joel Grey as Dr. Ruth's husband). However, Westheimer backed out when she learned the role involved her playing a thief. The role went instead to 89-year-old Paula Trueman.

Another role went to Bergstein's friend, New York radio personality "Cousin Brucie" Morrow. She initially wanted him to portray the social director, but then later asked him to play the part of the magician. Morrow himself could be heard at different parts of the movie as a New York area DJ (at the time of the film's setting he was working at WABC, a top 40 station), and served as period music consultant. The role of the social director went to the then-unknown Wayne Knight (later of Seinfeld and 3rd Rock from the Sun fame).

The part of Baby's mother was originally given to Lynne Lipton, who is briefly visible in the beginning, when the Houseman family first pulls into Kellerman's (she is in the front seat for a few seconds; her blonde hair is the only indication), but she became ill during the first week of shooting and was replaced by actress Kelly Bishop, who had already been cast to play resort guest Vivian Pressman. Bishop moved into the role of Mrs. Houseman, and the film's assistant choreographer Miranda Garrison took on the role of Vivian. (When Baby is dancing in the final scene, the line that her mother says to Jerry Orbach, "She gets that from me ..." is a wink to the fact that Kelly Bishop was in the original cast of A Chorus Line winning a 1976 Tony Award for Best Featured Actress in a Musical for her performance, using the name at that time of Carole Bishop, and had been a professional dancer.)

=== Filming ===
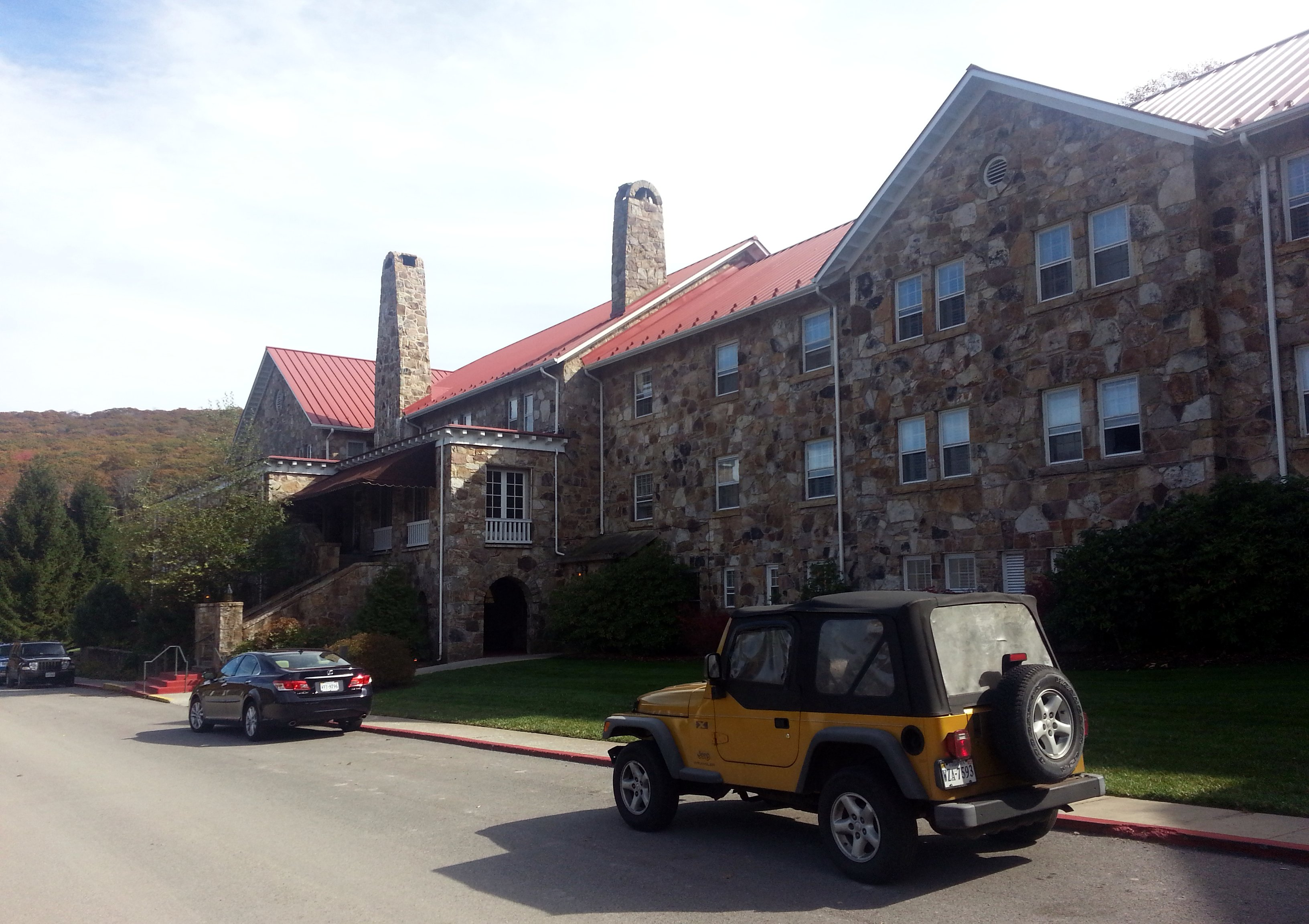
Mountain Lake Hotel, Virginia, the filming location of the Kellerman's Hotel

Principal photography for Dirty Dancing took place in Lake Lure, North Carolina, and Mountain Lake, Virginia. Scenes in Lake Lure were filmed at a former Boy Scout Camp called Camp Chimney Rock, which is now a private, residential community known as Firefly Cove where only the stone steps where Baby practiced still exist. These scenes included the interior dancing scenes, Baby carrying the watermelon and practicing on the signature stairs, Johnny's cabin, the staff cabins and the dances on a log. The final dance scene was filmed at the camp gymnasium, which no longer stands. The golf scene where Baby asks her father for $250 was filmed at Rumbling Bald Golf Course. Scenes filmed at Mountain Lake included dining scenes, Kellerman's Hotel, the beach games, the Houseman family's cabins, the water lift scene and Penny crying in the kitchen.

Filming started for Dirty Dancing on September 5, 1986, and lasted just 43 days. The production had to battle bad weather, including outside temperatures of 105 °F (41 °C). With the camera and lighting equipment needed for filming, the temperature inside could be as high as 120 °F (49 °C). According to choreographer Kenny Ortega, 10 people passed out within 25 minutes of shooting one day. Paula Trueman collapsed and was taken to the local emergency room to be treated for dehydration. Patrick Swayze also required a hospital visit; insisting on doing his own stunts, he repeatedly fell off the log during the "balancing" scene and injured his knee so badly he had to have fluid drained from the swelling.

Delays in the shooting schedule pushed filming into the autumn, which required the set decorators to spray-paint the autumn leaves green. The weather became cold, causing the lake's temperatures to drop to near 40 °F (4 °C) for the famous swimming scene, which was filmed in October. Despite her character's enjoyment, Grey later described the water as "horrifically" cold, and she might not have gone into the lake, except that she was "young and hungry".

Relations between the two main stars varied throughout production. They had already had trouble getting along in their previous project, Red Dawn (1984), and worked things out enough to have an extremely positive screen test, but that initial cooperation soon faded, and they were soon "facing off" before every scene. To address this, producer Bergstein and director Ardolino forced the stars to re-watch their initial screen-tests—the ones with the "breathtaking" chemistry. This had the desired effect, and Swayze and Grey were able to return to the film with renewed energy and enthusiasm.

Some of the scenes in the film are improvised. For example, the scene where Grey was to stand in front of Swayze with her back to him and put her arm up behind his head while he trailed his fingers down her arm. Grey was exhausted at the time and found the move ticklish, and could not stop giggling each time Swayze tried it, and he became annoyed. The footage was found in the editing room and the producers decided the scene worked as it was and put it into the film, complete with Grey's giggling and Swayze's annoyed expression. It became one of the most famous scenes in the movie, turning out, as choreographer Kenny Ortega put it, "as one of the most delicate and honest moments in the film." Grey has stated that the final climactic lift was never rehearsed and only ever done on the day the scene was shot.

During production, the film dailies kept getting held up by authorities at the Canadian border, who thought the film was a pornographic production due to the title, leading Bergstein to consider renaming it to I Was a Teenage Mambo Queen.

=== Post-production ===
The shooting wrapped on October 27, 1986, both on-time and on-budget. No one on the team, however, liked the rough cut that was put together, and Vestron executives were convinced the film was going to be a flop. In May 1987, the film was screened for producer Aaron Russo. According to Vestron executive Mitchell Cannold, Russo's reaction at the end was to say simply, "Burn the negative, and collect the insurance."

Further disputes arose over whether a corporate sponsor could be found to promote the film. Marketers of the Clearasil acne product liked the film, seeing it as a vehicle to reach a teen target audience. However, when they learned the film contained an abortion scene, they asked for that part of the plot to be cut. As Bergstein refused, the Clearasil promotion was dropped. Consequently, Vestron promoted the film themselves and initially aimed for a July premiere before setting the premiere on August 16, 1987. The Vestron executives had planned to release the film in theaters for a weekend, and then home video, since Vestron had been in the video distribution business before film production.

== Reception ==
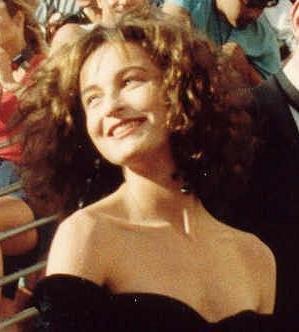
Jennifer Grey at the 1988 Academy Awards

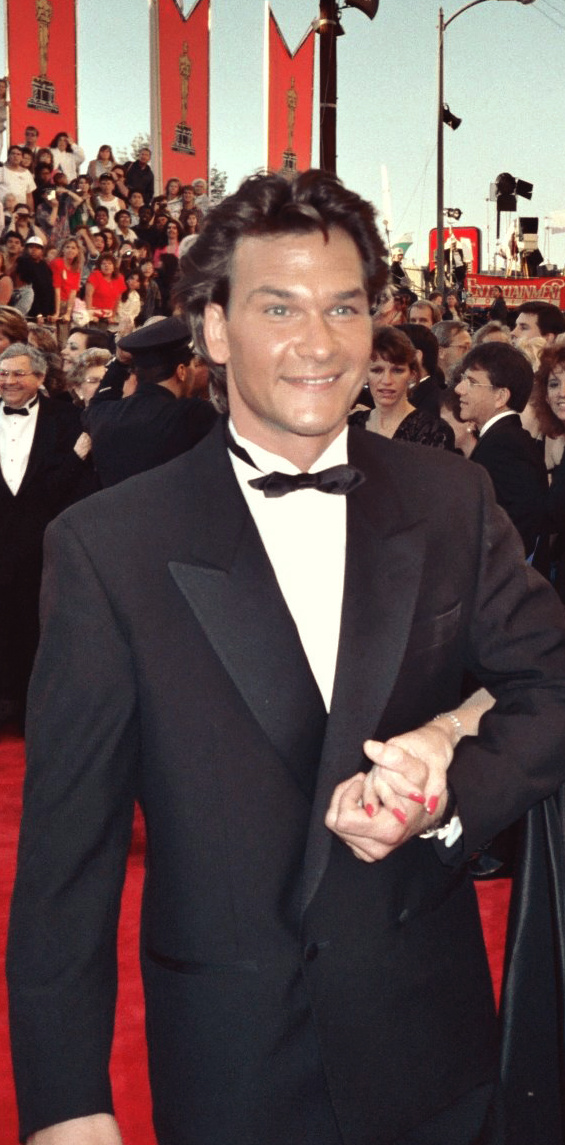
Swayze at the 1989 Emmy Awards

=== Critical response ===
Review aggregator Rotten Tomatoes gives the film a rating of 73% based on reviews from 80 critics. The site's critical consensus reads, "Like its winsome characters, Dirty Dancing uses impressive choreography and the power of song to surmount a series of formidable obstacles." Metacritic, another review aggregator, assigned the film a weighted average score of 65 out of 100, based on 20 critics, indicating "generally favorable" reviews. Audiences polled by CinemaScore gave the film an average grade of "A−" on an A+ to F scale.

The New York Times described the film as "a metaphor for America in the summer of 1963— orderly, prosperous, bursting with good intentions, a sort of Yiddish-inflected Camelot." Other reviews were more mixed: Gene Siskel gave the film a "marginal Thumbs Up" as he liked Jennifer Grey's acting and development of her character, while Roger Ebert gave it "Thumbs Down" due to its "idiot plot", calling it a "tired and relentlessly predictable story of love between kids from different backgrounds." Time magazine was lukewarm, saying, "If the ending of Eleanor Bergstein's script is too neat and inspirational, the rough energy of the film's song and dance does carry one along, past the whispered doubts of better judgment." In a retrospective review, Jezebel's Irin Carmon called the film "the greatest movie of all time" as "a great, brave movie for women" with "some subtle, retrospectively sharp-eyed critiques of class and gender."

Abortion rights advocates have called the film the "gold standard" for cinematic portrayals of abortion, which author Yannis Tzioumakis described as offering a "compassionate depiction of abortion in which the woman seeking an abortion was not demonized with the primary concerns being her health and preserving her capacity to bear children at a future time rather than the ethical dilemma that might or might not inform her decision, a portrayal that is not necessarily available in current films."

The film drew adult audiences instead of the expected teens, with viewers rating the film highly. Many filmgoers, after seeing the film once, went back into the theater to watch it a second time. Word-of-mouth promotion took the film to the number one position in the United States, and in 10 days it had broken the $10 million mark. By November, it was also achieving international fame. Within seven months of release, it had brought in $63 million in the US and boosted attendance in dance classes across America. It was one of the highest-grossing films of 1987, earning $170 million worldwide.

The film's popularity continued to grow after its initial release. It was the number one video rental of 1988 and became the first film to sell a million copies on video. When the film was re-released in 1997, ten years after its original release, Swayze received his own star on the Hollywood Walk of Fame, and videos were still selling at the rate of over 40,000 per month. It was selling a million DVDs per year in 2005, with over ten million copies sold by 2007.

A May 2007 survey by Britain's Sky Movies listed Dirty Dancing as number one on "Women's most-watched films", above the Star Wars trilogy, Grease, The Sound of Music, and Pretty Woman. The film's popularity has also caused it to be called "the Star Wars for girls."

The film's music has also had considerable impact. The closing song, "(I've Had) The Time of My Life", has been listed as the "third most popular song played at funerals" in the UK.

In October 2021, amid a dispute over abortion in Texas, magazine The Hollywood Reporter recommended the film as one to revisit on abortion in the cinema industry. Angie Han, writing for the magazine, highlighted Eleanor Bergstein's writing of the film.

=== Accolades ===
Award	Category	Nominee(s)	Result	Ref.
Academy Awards	Best Original Song	"(I've Had) The Time of My Life"; Music by Franke Previte, John DeNicola, and Donald Markowitz; Lyrics by Franke Previte	Won	
Amanda Awards	Best Foreign Feature Film	Emile Ardolino	Won	
ASCAP Film and Television Music Awards	Most Performed Songs from Motion Pictures	"Hungry Eyes"; Music and Lyrics by Franke Previte and John DeNicola	Won	
ASCAP Film and Television Music Awards	Most Performed Songs from Motion Pictures	"(I've Had) The Time of My Life"; Music by Franke Previte, John DeNicola, and Donald Markowitz; Lyrics by Franke Previte	Won	
BMI Film & TV Awards	Most Performed Song from a Film	"She's Like the Wind"; Music and Lyrics by Patrick Swayze and Stacy Widelitz	Won	
Deauville American Film Festival	International Critics Awards	Emile Ardolino	Nominated	
Golden Globe Awards	Best Motion Picture – Musical or Comedy		Nominated	
Golden Globe Awards	Best Actor in a Motion Picture – Musical or Comedy	Patrick Swayze	Nominated	
Golden Globe Awards	Best Actress in a Motion Picture – Musical or Comedy	Jennifer Grey	Nominated	
Golden Globe Awards	Best Original Song – Motion Picture	"(I've Had) The Time of My Life"; Music by Franke Previte, John DeNicola, and Donald Markowitz; Lyrics by Franke Previte	Won	
Golden Screen Awards			Won	
Grammy Awards	Best Pop Performance by a Duo or Group With Vocals	"(I've Had) The Time of My Life" – Bill Medley and Jennifer Warnes	Won	
Grammy Awards	Best Song Written Specifically for a Motion Picture or Television	"(I've Had) The Time of My Life"; Music by Franke Previte, John DeNicola, and Donald Markowitz; Lyrics by Franke Previte	Nominated	
Independent Spirit Awards	Best First Feature	Emile Ardolino	Won	
Jupiter Awards	Best International Film	Emile Ardolino	Nominated	
Kids' Choice Awards	Favorite Movie Actor	Patrick Swayze	Nominated	
TV Land Awards	Movie Dance Sequence You Reenacted in Your Living Room	"(I've Had) The Time of My Life"	Won	

The film is recognized by American Film Institute in these lists:

- 2002: AFI's 100 Years...100 Passions – #93
- 2004: AFI's 100 Years...100 Songs:
  - "(I've Had) The Time of My Life" – #86
- 2005: AFI's 100 Years...100 Movie Quotes:
  - Johnny Castle: "Nobody puts Baby in a corner." – #98

== Music ==
Rehearsals for the dancing, and some filming, used music from Bergstein's personal collection of gramophone records. When it came time to select actual music for the film, Vestron chose Jimmy Ienner as music supervisor. Ienner, who had previously produced albums and songs for John Lennon and Three Dog Night, opted to stick with much of the music that had already been used during filming and obtained licenses for the songs from Bergstein's collection. He also enlisted Swayze to sing the new song "She's Like the Wind". Swayze had written the song a few years earlier with Stacy Widelitz, originally intending for it to be used in the film Grandview, U.S.A. (1984).

John Morris composed the film's score. The lyrics for the Kellermans' song that closes the talent show were written specifically for the film and were sung to the tune of "Annie Lisle", a commonly used theme for school alma maters. Kenny Ortega and his assistant Miranda Garrison chose the song for the finale by going through an entire box of tapes, listening to each one. According to Ortega, literally the last tape they listened to had "The Time of My Life", which they saw as the obvious choice. Ienner then insisted that Bill Medley and Jennifer Warnes record it. The song won the 1988 Grammy Award for Best Pop Performance by a Duo or Group, an Academy Award for Best Original Song, and the Golden Globe Award for Best Original Song.

The film's soundtrack started an oldies music revival, and demand for the album caught RCA Records by surprise. The Dirty Dancing album spent 18 weeks at number one on the Billboard 200 album sales charts and went platinum 14 times, selling more than 32 million copies worldwide. It spawned a follow-up multi-platinum album in February 1988, entitled More Dirty Dancing.

Songs from the album that appeared on the charts included:

- "(I've Had) The Time of My Life," performed by Bill Medley and Jennifer Warnes, composed by Franke Previte, John deNicola, and Donald Markowitz – this song rose to No. 1 on the pop charts.
- "She's Like the Wind," performed by lead actor Patrick Swayze, composed by Swayze and Stacy Widelitz; this song peaked at No. 3 in 1988.
- "Hungry Eyes," performed by Eric Carmen, composed by Franke Previte and John deNicola; this song peaked at No. 4 in 1988.
- "Yes," performed by Merry Clayton, composed by Neal Cavanaugh, Terry Fryer, and Tom Graf; this song peaked No. 45 in 1988.

The Dirty Dancing album held the number one spot on the Billboard album chart for over four months. As of July 2022, the Dirty Dancing album has sold over 14 million copies. Additionally, the resurgence in popularity of the oldies contained in the movie led to a re-release of The Contours' single "Do You Love Me." "Do You Love Me" was featured in the movie but was omitted from the original soundtrack; it was included on More Dirty Dancing. Upon being re-released, "Do You Love Me" became a surprise hit all over again, this time peaking at No. 11 (it originally hit No. 3 back in 1962).

== Legacy ==
The iconic scene where Johnny confronts Jake with the line "Nobody puts Baby in a corner."

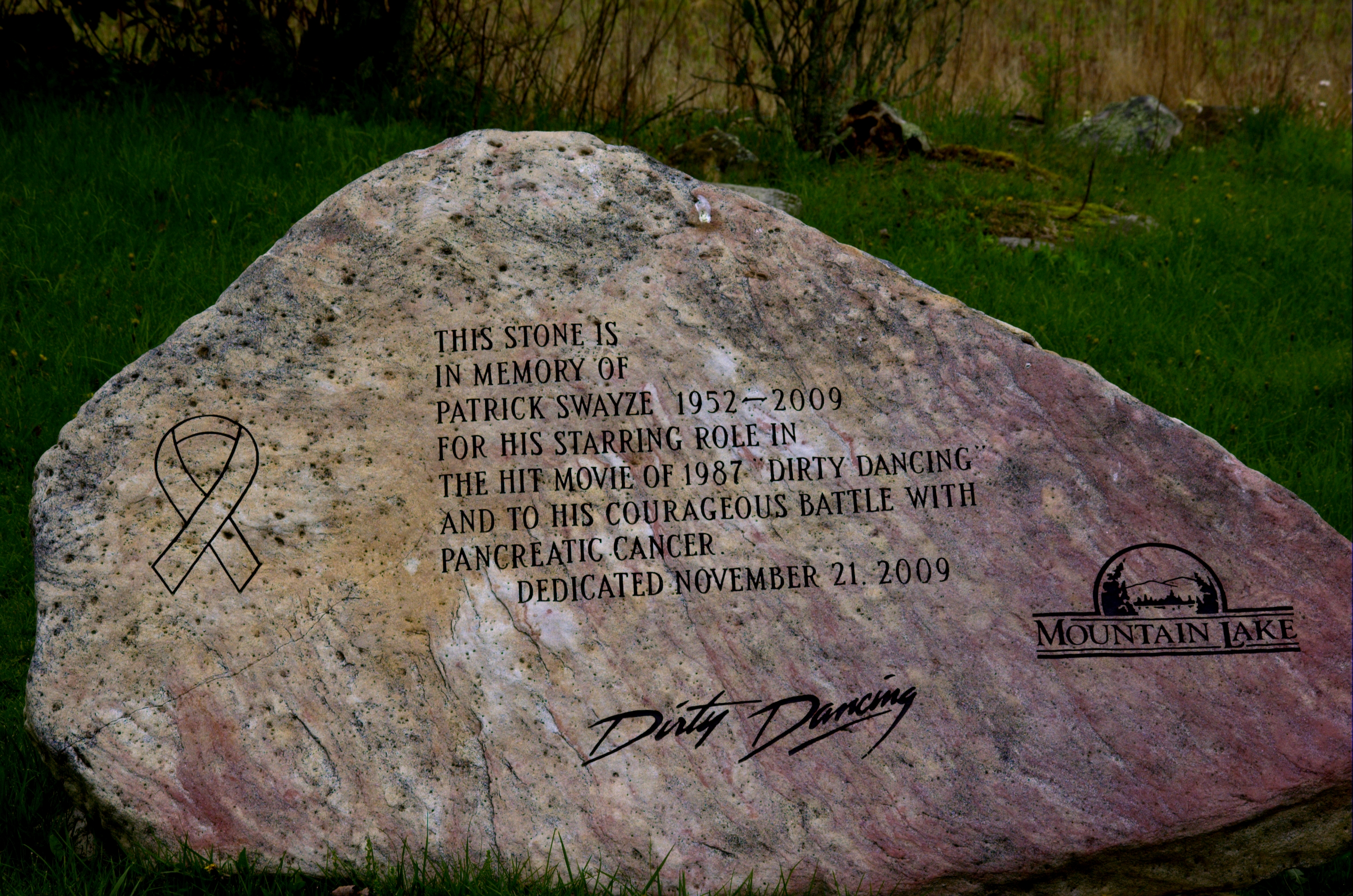
Memorial stone for Patrick Swayze dedicated in 2009, at Mountain Lake Hotel

In Sweden, feminist art group Sisters of Jam put the text "Nobody puts Baby in a corner" (in English) in white neon light at Umeå Bus Square (2008) and at Karlstad University (2012).

The resort where Dirty Dancing was filmed has had themed weekend activities, such as dance lessons, guided tours, film screenings, parties, and lawn games. Lionsgate, however, stopped the Dirty Dancing festival in 2023, so a Lake Lure Dance Festival is held instead, though festival organizers say they still remember the movie. The wood floor from the final dance scene was salvaged and used in Esmeralda Inn and Restaurant.

The film is screened annually for incoming first-years at Mount Holyoke College, specifically for the line "Baby's starting Mount Holyoke in the fall."

In 2024, the film was selected for preservation in the United States National Film Registry by the Library of Congress as being "culturally, historically, or aesthetically significant."

In 2025, the film became the 500th title to be logged one million times on Letterboxd.

== Other media ==
=== Tour ===
In 1988, a music tour, Dirty Dancing: Live in Concert, featuring Bill Medley, Eric Carmen, Merry Clayton, the Contours, and Ronnie Spector played 90 cities in three months.

=== TV series ===
In October 1988, CBS launched a weekly television series of the same name, however with no involvement of the original cast or crew. Starring Melora Hardin as Baby and Patrick Cassidy as Johnny, it was canceled after ten episodes.

=== Prequel ===
In 2004, a prequel film was released, entitled Havana Nights. Starring Romola Garai and Diego Luna, the plot follows a sheltered American teenager learning about life through dance, when her family relocates to Havana, Cuba just before the 1959 Cuban Revolution. Swayze was paid $5 million to appear in a cameo role as a dance teacher. The film was a minor box office success but received mostly negative reviews from critics.

=== Stage adaptation ===
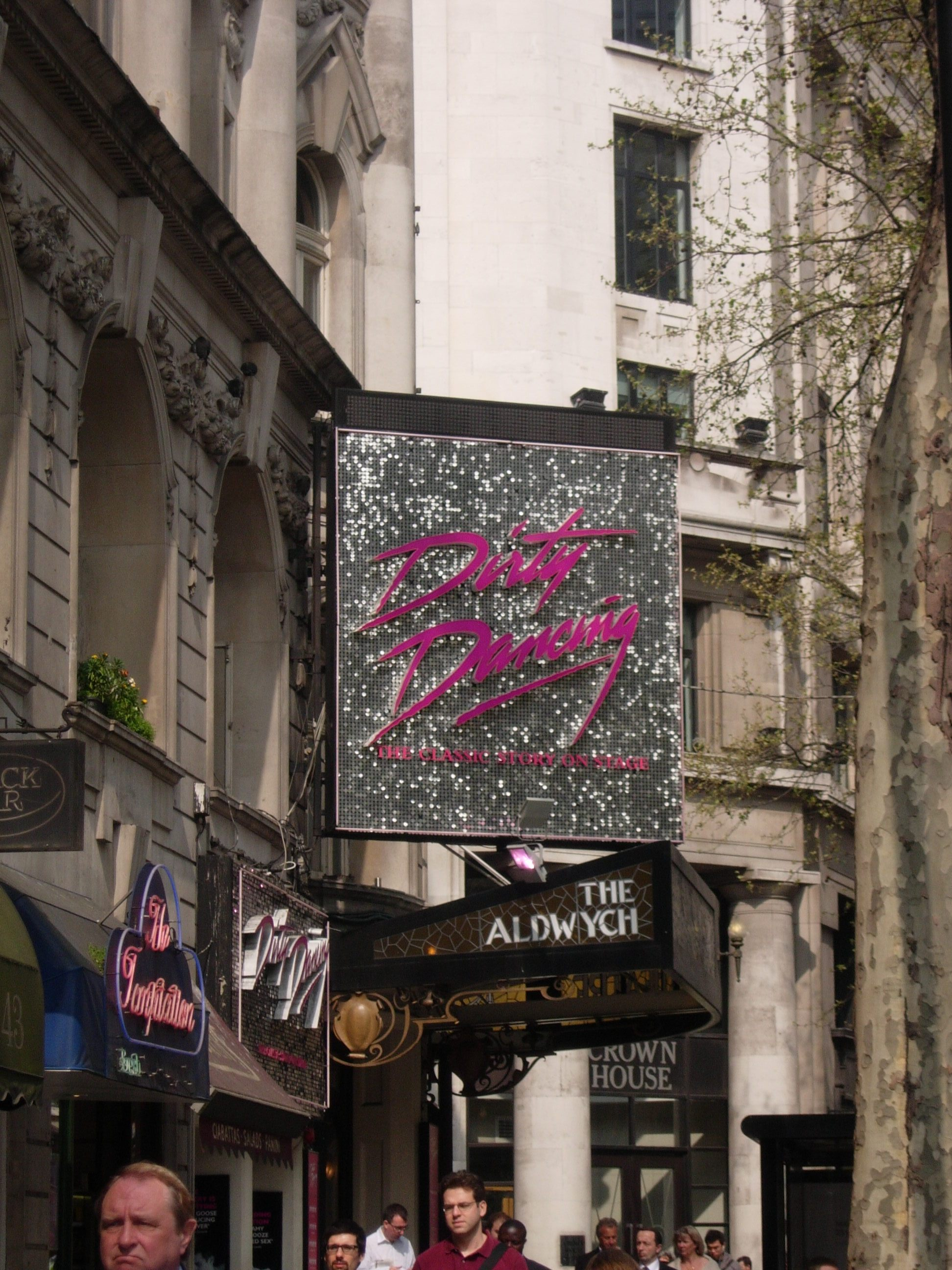
Dirty Dancing: The Classic Story on Stage musical at the West End's Aldwych Theatre, May 2007

The film was adapted for the stage in 2004 as a musical, Dirty Dancing: The Classic Story on Stage. Produced by Jacobsen Entertainment in Australia for $6.5 million, it was written by Eleanor Bergstein and had the same songs as the film, plus a few extra scenes. Musical direction was by Chong Lim (one of the composers for the 2000 Summer Olympics in Sydney), and the initial production starred Kym Valentine as Baby and Sydney Dance Company's Josef Brown as Johnny. Although reviews were mixed, the production was a commercial success, selling over 200,000 tickets during its six-month run. It has also had sellout runs in Germany and in London's West End, where it opened at the Aldwych Theatre on October 23, 2006, with the highest pre-sell in London history, earning £6 million (US$12 million). By March 2011, over 1 million people had seen the musical in London, selling out 6 months in advance. The original West End production closed in July 2011 after a five-year run, prior to a two-year national tour. The show returned to the West End at the Piccadilly Theatre and ran from July 13, 2013, to February 22, 2014, before resuming its tour of the United Kingdom and the Republic of Ireland. Another West End revival played at the Dominion Theatre from February 2 to April 16, 2022, then again between January 21 to April 29, 2023.

A New York production was in the planning stage in 2006, with the show first starting in other North American cities. It broke box office records in May 2007 for its first such venue, selling $2 million on the first day of ticket sales in Toronto, Ontario, Canada. The production opened on November 15, 2007, at the Royal Alexandra Theatre, with an all-Canadian cast, except for Monica West (Baby Houseman), Britta Lazenga (Penny Johnson), and Al Sapienza (Jake Houseman). After Toronto, the musical opened in Chicago in previews on September 28, 2008, and officially on October 19, 2008, running through January 17, 2009, followed by Boston (February 7 – March 15, 2009) and Los Angeles.

An official American tour began in September 2014 at the National Theatre in Washington, DC with dates scheduled in 31 cities. Previews started August 26 and the official opening night was on September 2. The original tour's cast included Jillian Mueller as Frances "Baby" Houseman, Samuel Pergande as Johnny Castle, Jenny Winton as Penny Johnson, Mark Elliot Wilson as Dr. Jake Houseman, Emily Rice as Lisa Houseman, Gary Lynch as Max Kellerman, Jesse Liebman as Neil Kellerman, Caralyn Kozlowski as Marjorie Houseman, Sam Edgerly as Robbie Gould, Jerome Harmann-Hardeman as Tito Suarez, Doug Carpenter as Billy Kostecki, Amanda Brantley as Vivian Pressman, Jon Drake as Moe Pressman, and Herman Petras as Mr. Schumacher.

A new stage production of the film will launch a North American Tour in August 2026 at the Ordway Center for the Performing Arts in Saint Paul, MN.

=== 20th anniversary releases ===
For the 20th anniversary in 2007, the film was re-released in theaters with additional footage, while the original film was reissued on DVD with deleted scenes, and included writer commentary. At the same time, Codemasters released Dirty Dancing: The Video Game. In the United Kingdom, the anniversary was marked by a reality TV show based on the film; titled Dirty Dancing: The Time of Your Life, which was filmed at the Mountain Lake resort.

In the UK, to mark the 20th anniversary, Channel Five broadcast a special documentary called Seriously Dirty Dancing. Presented by Dawn Porter, an investigative journalist and a self-confessed Dirty Dancing addict, it was very successful, being Channel Five's highest rated documentary of 2007. Porter visited the film set, met other fanatics, and learned the last dance, which she performs at the end in front of family and friends.

=== Remake ===
In August 2011, Lionsgate announced their plan to produce a remake, and confirmed that the original film's choreographer, Kenny Ortega, was attached to direct. "We believe that the timing couldn't be better to modernize this story on the big screen, and we are proud to have Kenny Ortega at the helm", Joe Drake, president of Lionsgate's Motion Picture Group, explained about the project. A miniseries version of Dirty Dancing had been scheduled to be shot in Western North Carolina. The miniseries was put on hold in July, 2015.

In December 2015, ABC ordered a three-hour musical remake of Dirty Dancing, starring Abigail Breslin, Colt Prattes, Debra Messing, Sarah Hyland, Nicole Scherzinger, Billy Dee Williams and Shane Harper. It aired on May 24, 2017, and received largely negative reviews.

=== Sequel ===
Plans for a Dirty Dancing sequel were first discussed by Vestron in 1988. In 2020, a sequel was announced with Grey attached to reprise her role as Baby. As part of their presentation during CinemaCon 2022, current rights owner Lionsgate announced the film had the tentative title of DD and reaffirmed that Grey would still reprise her role as Baby. On May 9, 2022, it was announced that the film was eyeing a February 2024 release date, with Jonathan Levine announced to direct. In July 2023, as a result of the 2023 SAG-AFTRA strike and with the film not having started filming, Lionsgate pushed the film's release date to an unspecified date in the summer of 2025. The Hollywood Reporter said filming would begin in 2026, that Nina Jacobson and Brad Simpson will produce, and Kim Rosenstock will write the script.

=== Appearance in The Movies That Made Us ===
The Movies That Made Us, a docuseries released by Netflix, launched their show with a pilot episode focused on Dirty Dancing. The first episode of the first season documents the journey and challenges of getting the film onto the screen. Many behind-the-scenes facts are also included.

== See also ==
- List of cult films
