= Scott Richter =

Email spammer (born 1971)

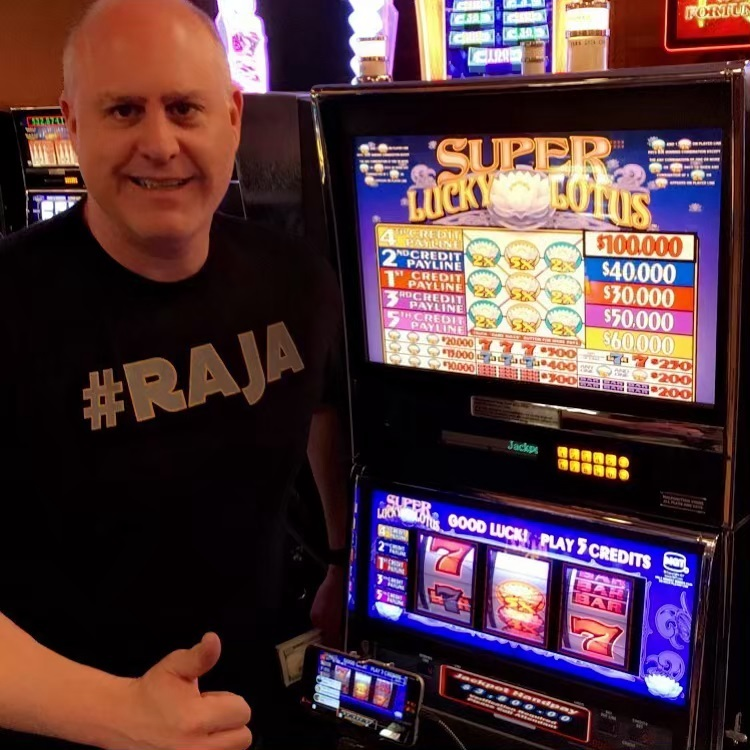
- Richter in 2019
- Born: Scott Richter; 18 July 1971 (age 55); Virginia, U.S.

YouTube information
- Channel: The Big Jackpot
- Years active: 2015–present
- Genre: Casino Slots
- Subscribers: 638 thousand
- Views: 352 million
- Last updated: June 4, 2025
- Website: thebigjackpot.com

Scott Richter (born 18 July 1971) is the CEO of Media Breakaway, formerly known as OptInRealBig.com LLC. Other related companies are Dynamic Dolphin and affiliate.com. His companies were major senders of Email spam and he was at one time referred to as the 'Spam King', as at one point his company was sending some 100 million emails a day. He and his companies have been sued several times for mass sending unsolicited advertisements.

== Career ==
New York Attorney General Eliot Spitzer sued Richter in December 2003. Facing a $500 million judgment in Washington state from the Microsoft case in March 2005, OptInRealBig.com filed for bankruptcy protection. The company claimed to have assets of less than US$10 million and debts of more than $50 million.

Microsoft's refusal to settle a $20 million claim based on Washington state spam law is what forced OptInRealBig to file for bankruptcy. Steven Richter, who is Scott Richter's father and President and General Counsel of Scott's company, commented "OptIn is profitable but for these lawsuits." Richter paid $7 million to Microsoft in 2006 in a settlement arising out of the lawsuit alleging illegal spam activities.

Richter was listed in the ROKSO top 100 spammers, but is no longer included there. His company once sent some 100 million emails a day. One of the most famous emails was the offer of most-wanted Iraqi playing cards in 2003; Richter claims to have sold 40,000 decks before they were even printed. He was interviewed on The Daily Show by Rob Corddry on 30 March 2004.

In January 2007, his company Media Breakaway was sued by popular social networking website MySpace for allegedly gaining access to members' accounts and using them to send millions of spam messages appearing to be from users' MySpace "friends". Steven Richter, President and General Counsel of the company, denied the allegations. An arbitrator on June 16, 2008 awarded MySpace $4.8 million in damages and $1.2 million in attorney's fees against "spam king" Scott Richter and his Web marketing company, Media Breakaway LLC, of Westminster, Colo., "for barraging MySpace members with unsolicited advertisements." The award was 5% of the amount demanded by MySpace. MySpace alleged that due to Scott, "some of the messages were sent from accounts whose sign-on information had been hijacked by phishing."

In 2008, CBS News reported that Media Breakaway was charging people cell-phone charges for supposedly free ringtones. Media Breakaway is the owner of Dynamic Dolphin, Inc, an ICANN accredited registrar who, according to KnujOn, is one of the few Internet registrars that serve the majority of spamvertised web sites.

On November 22, 2013, ICANN terminated the Registrar Agreement with Dynamic Dolphin. This ends Dynamic Dolphin's business as a domain registrar. The reason given was "material misrepresentation, material inaccuracy, or materially misleading statement(s)" regarding "the registrar's failure to disclose that Scott Richter was the CEO, director, and Secretary of the registrar since 2012" and "the registrar’s failure to disclose Scott Richter’s felony conviction". ICANN has ordered that all domains registered with Dynamic Dolphin be transferred to another registrar within 28 days.

Richter launched a YouTube channel called The Big Jackpot in December 2016.

In March 2017, Scott became a guest writer for Entrepreneur.com. On August 31, 2017, entrepreneur.com published an article by Scott Richter entitled, "Tips to Make Money on YouTube."

== See also ==
- List of spammers
