= Patrick Cassidy (actor) =

American actor (born 1962)

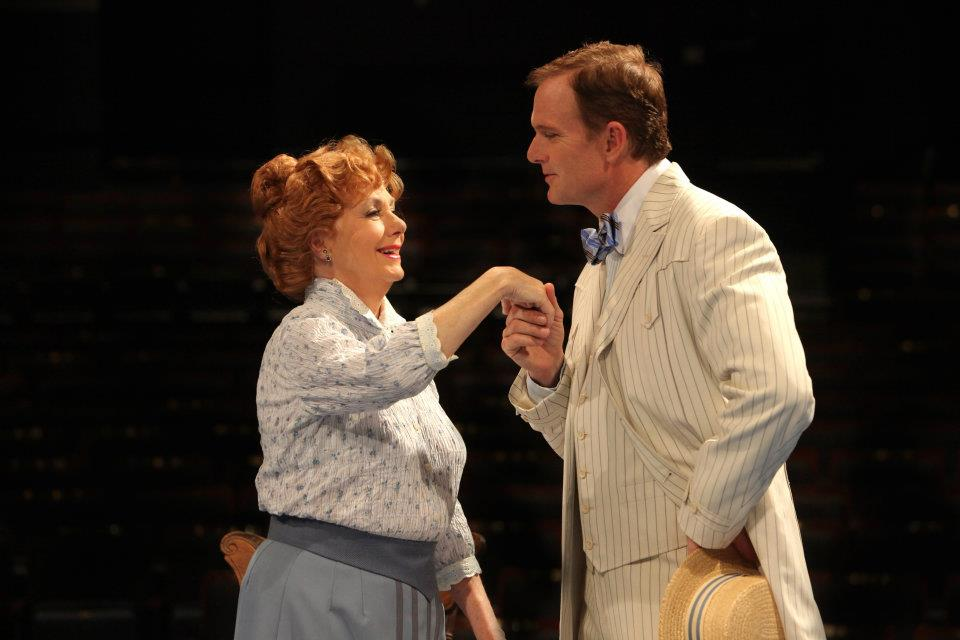
- Cassidy (right) dancing with his mother, Shirley Jones, in The Music Man, 2012
- Born: Patrick William Cassidy; January 4, 1962 (age 64); Los Angeles, California, U.S.
- Occupations: Actor, singer
- Years active: 1981–present
- Spouse: Melissa Hurley
- Children: 2
- Parents: Jack Cassidy; Shirley Jones
- Relatives: Shaun Cassidy (brother); David Cassidy (paternal half-brother); Katie Cassidy (niece)

Patrick William Cassidy (born January 4, 1962) is an American actor and singer best known for his roles in musical theatre and television.

== Personal life ==
Patrick Cassidy was born in Los Angeles, California, the son of Shirley Jones and Jack Cassidy. Jones was pregnant with Cassidy while filming The Music Man; Cassidy even kicked Jones' co-star Robert Preston in one scene when they were embracing.

Cassidy's brothers are Ryan Cassidy and Shaun Cassidy, and his half-brother was David Cassidy. He is also the uncle of Arrow star Katie Cassidy.

Cassidy is married to actress Melissa Hurley and is the father of two sons, Cole Patrick and Jack Gordon. His son Jack, a gospel singer/songwriter, auditioned for the 12th season of The Voice in 2017 and picked Alicia Keys as his coach.

== Career ==
Cassidy decided to enter his Beverly Hills High School drama program after breaking his collarbone while playing as the quarterback for the high school football team.

=== Screen ===
Cassidy's first starring television role was in 1981 in the cautionary NBC movie Angel Dusted. Also in 1981, he co-starred in the made-for-TV movie Midnight Offerings as David Sterling, the love interest of Vivian Sotherland and Robin Prentiss, two dueling teenage classmates who happen to be witches, played by Melissa Sue Anderson and Mary Elizabeth McDonough. In 1983, he starred in Bay City Blues as Terry St. Marie, a baseball player in the minor leagues. The show was canceled after just four episodes. In 1984, Cassidy portrayed Willard Freud, the initial love interest to Heather Langenkamp's character Callie Wells in the film Nickel Mountain.

In 1986, Cassidy played David Hand, a cadet at a military academy in Dress Gray and appeared in the holiday TV movie Christmas Eve with Loretta Young. He had a role as a gambling soldier in the Ryan O'Neal sports and Las Vegas gambling film Fever Pitch. In 1988, he starred in the CBS television series Dirty Dancing, based on the film. In 1989, he appeared in Longtime Companion, portraying Howard, an actor who eventually contracts AIDS. In 1994, he appeared in the films I'll Do Anything and How the West Was Fun with Mary-Kate and Ashley Olsen. In 1997, he had a recurring role on TV's Lois & Clark: The New Adventures of Superman as Leslie Luckaby and had another Superman-related recurring role as Henry Small, the biological father of Lana Lang (Kristin Kreuk) in Smallville, which was televised from 2001 to 2011.

Cassidy co-starred alongside his half-brother David in a 2009 ABC Family comedy series entitled Ruby & the Rockits created by his brother Shaun. ABC Family announced on September 12, 2009 that the show had been canceled.

=== Stage ===
Cassidy played Frederic in the 1981 national tour of Gilbert and Sullivan's The Pirates of Penzance before taking over the role on Broadway in 1982. Cassidy's next Broadway role was Jeff Barry in the Ellie Greenwich jukebox musical Leader of the Pack, which opened in April 1985. He originated the role of The Balladeer in the original Off-Broadway production of Stephen Sondheim's Assassins at Playwrights Horizons, which opened in December 1990 in previews.

Cassidy starred at the Elitch Theatre's production of The Robber Bridegroom in 1991. This was the 100th anniversary of the theatre and it was the final production there before it was dormant for over 20 years.

In 1993, Cassidy starred as Bobby opposite Carol Burnett in a Los Angeles production of Sondheim's musical Company. In 1995, he portrayed John Wilkes Booth in the Los Angeles Repertory staging of Assassins.

In 1998, Cassidy played Macheath in a Los Angeles Reprise! production of The Threepenny Opera; he was nominated for the Garland Award for Best Actor for his work in the role. In 1999, he played the title character Joseph in a national tour of Joseph and the Amazing Technicolor Dreamcoat.

In 2000, Cassidy co-starred with Cheryl Ladd in Annie Get Your Gun on Broadway when he took over for Tom Wopat in the role of Frank Butler. He later reprised his role of Frank Butler alongside Patti LuPone and George Hearn in August 2010 concert presentations at the Ravinia Festival in Illinois, directed by Lonny Price.

In 2001, Cassidy played Radames in the national tour of the musical Aida; he won the 2002 National Broadway Theatre Award for Best Actor in a Touring Musical before playing the role on Broadway in June 2002.

From 2004 to 2005, Cassidy was back on Broadway in 42nd Street when he took over for Patrick Ryan Sullivan as Julian Marsh playing opposite his mother as Dorothy Brock. He appeared in a US national tour of Joseph and the Amazing Technicolor Dreamcoat, once again playing the title role, starting in September 2005.
