= Greatest (Raspberries album) =

Compilation album by Raspberries
- Released: 2005
- Recorded: 1972 – 1974
- Genre: Pop rock
- Label: Capitol
- Producer: Jimmy Ienner

Raspberries chronology
| Capitol Collectors Series (1991) | Greatest (2005) |

Greatest is a 2005 compilation album by Raspberries. The album contains 20 songs, 4 to 6 from each of the group's four albums. Most of the songs on Greatest had been included on previous Raspberries' compilation albums, but the songs on Greatest were remastered using 24-bit technology, and the album included liner notes quoting three members of the band – Eric Carmen, Wally Bryson and Jim Bonfanti discussing each song.

Allmusic critic Mark Deming summed up his review of Greatest saying that it "is an excellent one-stop shopping place for your Raspberries needs. You may not need this to replace any of the previous greatest-hits sets, but anyone looking for a great introduction to this great band can buy this with confidence." News-Press critic Mark Marymont called it "a respectful retrospective of a band that should have been bigger."

== Track listing ==
1. "Go All the Way" (Carmen) – 3:21
2. "Come Around and See Me" (Carmen, Bryson) – 3:09
3. "Don't Want to Say Goodbye" (Carmen, Bryson) – 5:08
4. "I Saw the Light" (Carmen, Bryson) – 2:43
5. "I Can Remember" (Carmen) – 8:01
6. "I Wanna Be with You" (Carmen) – 3:06
7. "Drivin' Around" (Carmen, Smalley) – 3:02
8. "Let's Pretend" (Carmen) – 3:41
9. "I Reach for the Light" (Carmen) – 3:50
10. "Nobody Knows" (Carmen, Smalley) – 2:22
11. "If You Change Your Mind" (Carmen) – 3:46
12. "Tonight" (Carmen) – 3:40
13. "I'm a Rocker" (Carmen) – 5:11
14. "Ecstasy" (Carmen) – 3:37
15. "Last Dance" (Bryson) – 3:38
16. "I Don't Know What I Want" (Carmen) – 4:17
17. "Cruisin' Music" (Carmen) – 3:09
18. "Starting Over" (Carmen) – 4:09
19. Party's Over" (Bryson, Carmen) – 3:08
20. "Overnight Sensation (Hit Record)" (Carmen) – 5:36
- Tracks 1–5 from Raspberries.
- Tracks 6–11 from Fresh Raspberries.
- Tracks 12–15 from Side 3.
- Tracks 16–20 from Starting Over.
