= Capitol Collectors Series (Raspberries album) =

The Capitol Collectors Series

Compilation album by Raspberries
- Released: February 26, 1991
- Recorded: Record Plant Studios, New York City
- Genre: Power pop, rock
- Length: 76:12
- Label: Capitol
- Producer: Jimmy Ienner

Raspberries chronology
Raspberries' Best (1976)	The Capitol Collectors Series (1991)	Greatest (2005)

Raspberries Capitol Collectors Series is a 1991 compilation of 20 tracks recorded by the band between 1972 and 1974. This release was the first time that many of these songs were available on compact disc. The CD contained two unlisted bonus tracks of radio spots used to promote the albums Fresh Raspberries and Starting Over. The compilation was also available on cassette. It has been out of print for several years.

Most of the songs on the album were written by Eric Carmen but the album also includes "Last Dance" by guitarist Wally Bryson, "Hard to Get Over a Heartbreak" by bassist/guitarist David Smalley and "Rose Coloured Glasses" by bassist Scott McCarl. It also includes Bryson's "Party's Over".

The one glaring omission is Carmen's eight minute magnum opus, "I Can Remember" from Raspberries' debut album.

Allmusic critic Bruce Eder said that "this 20-song retrospective gives a good overall impression of the Raspberries' strengths across their two years of recording, as well as hints of some weaknesses in the way they were represented on record."

== Track listing ==
1. Go All the Way
2. Come Around And See Me
3. I Saw The Light
4. Don't Want to Say Goodbye
5. I Wanna Be With You
6. Let's Pretend
7. I Reach for the Light
8. Nobody Knows
9. If You Change Your Mind
10. Drivin' Around
11. Tonight
12. Last Dance
13. Hard to Get Over a Heartbreak
14. I'm A Rocker
15. Ecstasy
16. Overnight Sensation
17. Party's Over
18. Rose Coloured Glasses
19. Cruisin' Music
20. Starting Over
21. Promo Spot #1 (CD only)
22. Promo Spot #2 (CD only)
- Tracks 1–4 from Raspberries.
- Tracks 5–10 from Fresh Raspberries.
- Tracks 11–15 from Side 3.
- Tracks 16–20 from Starting Over.
