= Raspberries' Best =

Compilation album by Raspberries
- Released: 1976
- Recorded: 1972–1974
- Genre: Pop rock
- Length: 43:00
- Label: Capitol
- Producer: Jimmy Ienner

Raspberries chronology
Starting Over (1974)	Raspberries' Best (1976)	Capitol Collectors Series (1991)

Professional ratings
Review scores
Source	Rating
AllMusic	4.5/5 stars
Christgau's Record Guide	A−
The New Rolling Stone Record Guide	4/5 stars

Raspberries' Best Featuring Eric Carmen, more commonly known as Raspberries' Best, is a 1976 compilation album by Raspberries. The album contained songs from each of the group's four LP's, which were recorded between 1972 and 1974. Most of the tracks on this LP were among their seven charting hits. The group had already disbanded when this compilation was released.

Raspberries' Best was well received by critics; Dave Marsh called it "an exquisite anthology of Seventies pop rock that's a throwback to the heyday of the Beatles and Beach Boys", while Robert Christgau said the compilation "performs a needed service by compiling cuts from the group's first two (flawed) albums".

== Track listing ==
1. "Go All the Way" (Carmen) – 3:10 / Lead vocal: Eric
2. "Tonight" (Carmen) – 3:40 / Lead vocal: Eric
3. "Ecstasy" (Carmen) – 3:38 / Lead vocal: Eric
4. "I Wanna Be with You" (Carmen) – 3:05 / Lead vocal: Eric
5. "I Can Remember" (Carmen) – 8:00 / Lead vocal: Eric
6. "Overnight Sensation (Hit Record)" (Carmen) – 5:34 / Lead vocal: Eric
7. "Let's Pretend" (Carmen) – 3:41 / Lead vocal: Eric
8. "Drivin' Around" (Carmen, Smalley) – 3:01 / Lead vocal: Eric
9. "Starting Over" (Carmen) – 4:10 / Lead vocal: Eric
10. "Don't Want to Say Goodbye" (Carmen, Bryson) – 5:05 / Lead vocal: Eric and Wally
- Tracks 1, 5, and 10 from Raspberries.
- Tracks 4, 7, and 8 from Fresh.
- Tracks 2 and 3 from Side 3.
- Tracks 6 and 9 from Starting Over.

Timings and credits taken from the original Capitol issue (ST-11524).
