= Don't Want to Say Goodbye =

Single by Raspberries

from the album Raspberries
- B-side: "Rock & Roll Mama"
- Released: February 1972
- Recorded: early 1972
- Studio: Abbey Road Studios London
- Length: 5:00
- Label: Capitol
- Songwriter(s): Eric Carmen, Wally Bryson
- Producer(s): Jimmy Ienner

Raspberries singles chronology
"Don't Want to Say Goodbye" (1972)	"Go All the Way" (1972)

"Don't Want to Say Goodbye" is a song written by Eric Carmen and Wally Bryson that was first released on the Raspberries 1972 debut album Raspberries. It was released as the first single from the album and reached No. 86 on the Billboard Hot 100.

== Reception ==
Record World said of "Don't Want to Say Goodbye" that it's "a ballad with just a touch of the Beatles sound. No ifs, ands or buts, this one should hit. Impressive beginning." Cash Box said of it that "Lighthouse producer Jimmy Ienner blazes a ballad trail, setting new Cleveland quartet in a fine light of its own. Tune should appeal to Top 40 and MORs." Wichita Beacon critic Paul Baker called it a "beautiful song" despite not charting as well as hoped. Elk Grove Herald critic Tom Von Malder noted the song's "exciting changes of tempo."

Music journalist Mark Borack said that the song is "papered with pretty piano passages and melodies." Ultimate Classic Rock critic Dave Swanson rated it as the 9th best Raspberries song. Swanson described it as a "great McCartney-esque ballad" and a "lush, beautiful and still rocking song." Classic Rock History critic Brian Kachejian it as the Raspberries' 5th best song, saying that "the melody and arrangement was a bit more progressive in nature than some of [the Raspberries'] more sweet sounding pop songs" and praising the "great chord change in the chorus."

== Releases ==
Capitol Records chose to release "Don't Want to Say Goodbye" as the lead single from Raspberries. The song stalled at #86 on the Billboard Hot 100, but did better in some areas. For example, it was a hit in the band's native Cleveland and reached the Top 20 on the survey of the radio station KYSN in Colorado Springs. It also reached #90 on the Cash Box Top 100 and #89 on the Record World Singles Chart. Music journalist Ken Sharp said that one of the reasons the single did not perform well was that it was too long, at 5 minutes, when it is difficult to get radio programmers to play new artists even when the single is shorter.

Lead singer Eric Carmen said that the band was surprised that Capitol released "Don't Want to Say Goodbye" as the lead single and said that "They pressed up the records without saying anything on the label because they thought that we sounded a lot like the Bee Gees and they wanted to fool program directors." Carmen also said that "I didn't want to tell anybody how to do their business, but a five-minute ballad as your first single? I couldn't see tons of music stations throwing that record on." The band had wanted "Go All the Way" to be their first single, and were proven prescient when that song was released as the second single and went to the Top 10.

"Don't Want to Say Goodbye" was later released as the B-side of the Raspberries' 1974 single "Ecstasy". It was also included on several Raspberries' compilation albums, such as Raspberries' Best, Capitol Collectors Series and Greatest.
