= The Choir (EP) =

Compilation album by The Choir
- Released: 1976
- Recorded: 1966–1969
- Genres: Garage rock, rock and roll
- Label: Bomp!

The Choir is a retrospective EP by the American rock band The Choir that has been released only in 7" format. The cover features the same photograph as Choir Practice, although it has been cropped and is much grainier. There are actually five songs on the record, even though the cover says that there are only four.

== Release data ==
The record was released in 1976 by Bomp! Records (catalogue number BOMP-104) as a 7" 45-rpm EP.

== Notes on the tracks ==
This was the first album or EP that included any songs by The Choir. Even their classic "It's Cold Outside" would not be reissued until 1979 (on Pebbles, Volume 2). All of the songs on this EP were previously unreleased when this album was issued and would not be otherwise available until the release of the more comprehensive Choir Practice almost 20 years later.

== Track listing ==
1. "Anyway I Can"
2. "Don't Change Your Mind"
3. "I'd Rather You Leave Me"
4. "Treeberry"
5. "I Only Did It 'Cause I Felt So Lonely"
