= Come Inside (disambiguation) =

Come Inside is a Finnish rock/pop band.

Come Inside may also refer to:

- "Come Inside" (song), a song by Thompson Twins
- "Come Inside", a song by Crazy Town from The Brimstone Sluggers
- "Come Inside", a song from Mad, Bad and Dangerous to Know (Dead or Alive album)
