= Wally Bryson =

American guitarist (born 1949)

- Born: Wallace Carter Bryson; July 18, 1949 (age 77); Gastonia, North Carolina, U.S.
- Origin: Ohio, U.S.
- Occupations: Guitarist, vocalist
- Instruments: Guitar, vocals
- Years active: 1966–present
- Formerly of: The Choir (1964-1970); Raspberries (1970-1974); Fotomaker (1977-1978)

Wallace Carter Bryson (born July 18, 1949) is an American guitarist, best remembered for his time with the power-pop group Raspberries, famous for their hit "Go All The Way". After the Raspberries split in 1974, Bryson co-formed the power pop group Fotomaker and became one of the leading members of the group.

== Early life ==
Born in North Carolina, at age four, Bryson's family moved to Cleveland, Ohio. His love for music came around as a child, upon hearing the guitar on the radio: I listened to early 1950's radio and after hearing Duane Eddy, asked my mother what that sound was, and she told me it was electric guitar. So, I got a four-string ukulele at age eight and got my first electric guitar at age 12. His first influences were James Burton of Ricky Nelson's band, Buddy Merrill, and Elvis Presley.

== The Choir ==
In 1964, at age 15, he joined the group The Mods (which was renamed the Choir in 1966); this band included future Raspberries members Jim Bonfanti and Dave Smalley, along with Dan Klawon and Dave Burke They had a huge local hit with It's Cold Outside, written by Klawon, which charted at 49 on the U.S. Record World, and 68 on the Billboard Hot 100. The Choir was a very popular local band and would later open for the likes of The Who, Herman's Hermits and The Blues Magoos.

== The Raspberries ==
The Choir had become Raspberries by 1970 and helped to reinvigorate the power pop genre of the 1960s. After experiencing plenty of chart success, the group encountered some internal problems which prompted Bryson to leave the group in 1974 at the height of their popularity and the group disbanded a year later.

For Raspberries' 1972 debut album, "Raspberries", Bryson wrote "Come Around and See Me" and "With You in My Life" and with Eric Carmen co-wrote "Go All the Way", "I Saw the Light" and "Don't Want to Say Goodbye". Bryson is best known for playing a double-neck guitar. He played a Gibson double-neck guitar on the opening riff on “Go All The Way”.

Bryson's opening guitar riff on "Go All the Way" has been described as one of the all-time great rock 'n' roll riffs, with Steve Sullivan saying that its power "still has the capacity to startle and thrill more than four decades later." Music journalist Ken Sharp particularly praised Bryson's "ripping power chords" on the 1973 single "Tonight". Bryson said of his guitar playing at the beginning of "Tonight" that it has "one of those intros that nobody knows how to play but me" because he made up "weird chords to get different sounds." Sharp also praised Bryson's guitar playing on the single "Ecstasy", saying that "this track displays my belief that Wally Bryson is a bona fide Guitar God."

== Fotomaker ==
Bryson then joined Fotomaker in 1977, a group which was promoted as a power pop supergroup by Atlantic Records featuring former Rascals members Dino Danelli and Gene Cornish, as their bass guitarist.

The 1978 debut release, simply titled Fotomaker, was a classic example of 1970s power pop. The LP was released on Atlantic Records.

The second album, Vis-a-Vis, was hurriedly released later in October 1978. It was recorded at The Record Plant studios (used by the Raspberries) that summer on Wally Bryson's suggestion. Vis-a-Vis opened with Vinci's song "Miles Away", which was released as a single and peaked at number 63 on the Billboard Hot 100.

Fotomaker recorded two albums with Bryson which received little notice, just before he left in 1979, prior to their third and final album.

== Later works ==
After leaving Raspberries, Bryson relocated to Los Angeles and formed the group Flyer briefly before starting the band Tattoo which included some musician friends from Cleveland, but this band's only album in 1975 received poor reviews, and described by AllMusic as a "disaster". The album also contained a cover of the Choir's "It's Cold Outside". After leaving Fotomaker and returning to Cleveland in the spring of 1979, Bryson teamed with songwriter/bassist Danny Klawon, formerly of the Choir and Its Cold Outside, to form Peter Panic. Peter Panic played out sparsely, performing mostly originals including Bryson's introspective "Don't Know" and Klawon's "Restless" and "Lost Your Love", and performed in January 1980 on Walt Maskey's radio show "Home-Grown". However, Peter Panic never officially recorded.

Bryson left Peter Panic in the spring of 1980 and teamed up with original Raspberries bassist Dave Smalley, Singer Eric Robertson and local drummer Frank Musarra to form the Cleveland Band The Secret, until Bryson's departure in 1985 when he went on to work with the Jimmy Ienner project Candy as a "musical director."

== Personal life ==
In his current residence at Cuyahoga County, Ohio, he works with Mentally Challenged people at the Cuyahoga County Board of Mental and Developmental Disabilities.

== Influences ==
Like many of his future music associates, Bryson was influenced by folk rock artists, particularly the Byrds.

== Discography ==
=== With The Choir ===
==== Albums ====
Title	Released
The Choir	1976 (originally recorded 1966–1969)
Choir Practice	1994 (originally recorded 1966–1969)

==== Singles ====
A-Side	B-Side	Year
"It's Cold Outside"	"I'm Goin' Home"	1966
"No One Here to Play With"	"Don't You Feel a Little Sorry for Me"	1967
"When You Were with Me"	"Changin' My Mind"	1967
"Gonna Have a Good Time Tonight"	"So Much Love"	1970

=== With Raspberries ===
==== Studio albums ====
Title	Released
Raspberries	1972
Fresh	1972
Side 3	1973
Starting Over	1974

==== Live albums ====
Title	Released
Live on Sunset Strip	2007
Pop Art Live	2017

==== Extended plays ====
Title	Released
Refreshed	2000

==== Singles ====
Title	Year
"Don't Want to Say Goodbye" b/w "Rock & Roll Mama"	1972
"Go All the Way" b/w "With You in My Life"	1972
"I Wanna Be with You" b/w "Goin' Nowhere Tonight"	1972
"Drivin' Around" b/w "Might As Well"	1972
"Let's Pretend" b/w "Every Way I Can"	1973
"Tonight" b/w "Hard to Get Over a Heartbreak"	1973
"I'm a Rocker" b/w "Money Down"	1973
"Ecstasy" b/w "Don't Want to Say Goodbye"	1973
"Overnight Sensation (Hit Record)" b/w "Hands on You"	1974
"Cruisin' Music" b/w "Party's Over"	1975

=== With Fotomaker ===
==== Albums ====
Title	Year
Fotomaker	1978
Vis-à-vis	1978

Singles

Title	Year
"Where Have You Been All My Life"	1978
"The Other Side"	1978

=== With Tattoo ===
==== Albums ====
Title	Year
Tattoo	1976
