= The Choir (Cleveland band) =

Cleveland, Ohio area rock band

- Also known as: The Mods
- Origin: Mentor, Ohio, United States
- Genres: Garage rock, rock and roll
- Years active: 1964–1966 (as the Mods); 1966–1970; 2006
- Labels: Canadian-American Records; Roulette Records; Intrepid Records
- Spinoff of: Raspberries
- Past members: Dann Klawon; Dave Smalley; Dan Heckel; Tom Boles; Wally Bryson; Dave Burke; Jim Bonfanti; Jim Skeen; Phil Giallombardo; Randy Klawon; Bob McBride; Rick Caon; Dennis (Denny) Carleton; Jim Anderson; Kenny Margolis

The Choir started as a Mentor, OH pop/rock band playing in the greater Cleveland area, from the mid-1960s into the early 1970s. Originally called The Mods, their largest commercial success came with the release of their first single "It's Cold Outside" in December 1966, originally on Canadian-American, then on Roulette. It went to Number 1 on the charts of Cleveland radio stations WKYC and WIXY in May of 1967. The song, considered to be a classic of the garage rock era, was featured on Pebbles, Volume 2, one of the earlier garage rock compilation LPs (issued in 1979). The flipside, "I'm Going Home" was included as a bonus track when the Pebbles album was reissued as a CD, and it can also be found on a garage rock compilation LP on Ohio bands, Highs in the Mid-Sixties, Volume 9. The Choir is well known for containing three of the four original members of Raspberries, Wally Bryson, Dave Smalley and Jim Bonfanti - (all except lead singer Eric Carmen).

== History ==
The first bandleader of the Choir, Dann Klawon (also called Dan Klawon or Danny Klawon), discovered Beatlemania in late 1963 before most of his peers, since a girl he knew had been to England and brought back a copy of the Beatles' first single, "Love Me Do", and one of their early albums before their release in the U.S. Within months, he had organized a band with three of his friends who all attended Mentor High School in Mentor, Ohio. Dann Klawon began as the drummer for the band, Dave Smalley and Dan Heckel were the guitarists, and Tom Boles served as lead singer. (Randy Klawon, Dann's brother, did not officially join the band until 1968; but he filled in on drums for one concert in 1966 when he was just 14.) They called themselves the Mods, and again, Klawon was ahead of his time: although Mod was established in England by the late 1950s, the British band that is most often identified as "mod" in the U.S. is the Who, which was formed in the same year as the Mods.

Soon, the Choir had subtracted Heckel and Boles and added Dave Burke on bass, Wally Bryson on guitar, and Jim Bonfanti on drums, while Klawon moved to the rhythm guitar post. Klawon recalls: "So we began playing songs by the Beatles, the Who, Stones, Zombies, Troggs, and Moody Blues. If they were from England, we played it. We had this song list that was unbelievable. ... And everybody alternated instruments, depending on what song. We'd have that written on [index] cards, as to who played what on what song."

In the summer of 1966, the band traveled to Chicago, where they recorded their first single with "It's Cold Outside" (written by bandleader Dann Klawon) on the A-side, which was originally released on Canadian-American Records. According to Klawon: "I used to write quite a bit then, and one day I was thinking of some sort of theme to use with the moon/spoon, boy/girl lyrics. I decided to go with a weather analogy." While there, they discovered that a Chicago band called the Modernaires had shortened their name to the Mods, so they renamed themselves the Choir. The song was hugely popular in Cleveland and topped the Cleveland charts for six weeks; the song did quite well throughout the Midwest, particularly after the re-release of the single on Roulette Records in early 1967. By the spring of 1967, "It's Cold Outside" peaked at No. 68 on the Billboard charts and at No. 55 on the Cash Box charts, and it even made the CHUM Charts in Toronto, Ontario, Canada. (The record peaked at #25 on the local chart of CKLW in Windsor, Ontario as well.)

Not long after the single was recorded, however, Dann Klawon and Dave Burke left the band, and a succession of line-up changes ensued. Ironically, considering that he would later front the Raspberries with three core members of the band, Eric Carmen was considered as a keeyboard player; but Kenny Margolis was selected instead. Carmen had been a major fan in the band's early years and was hurt by the rejection; not long after he joined Cyrus Erie, Carmen lured former Choir guitarist Wally Bryson to his new band, and they soon eclipsed the Choir as the most popular local band. The band's second and third singles did not have the same success as their first, and in the spring of 1968, the Choir disbanded.

The Choir re-formed in late 1968 – for the second time, with the bandleader also being the drummer (Jim Bonfanti) – and regained much of their earlier popularity in the local scene. According to Denny Carleton: "The new Choir's repertoire encompassed jazz, R&B, ballads and classical rock, and about 20 original songs. The group had an unusual keyboard-dominated sound, sometimes even using three keyboards on songs like 'MacArthur Park' and Traffic's 'Colored Rain'. While other bands were simply performing standard tunes by The Beatles, Stones and Who, etc., The Choir was attempting projects of some magnitude, like taking 'MacArthur Park', which was written for full orchestra, and rearranging it for three keyboards, bass, drums and guitar, or performing a 7-minute concerto with four time changes."

In 1969, the band returned to the studio and recorded a planned album that had a more psychedelic flavor, with eight original songs and a cover of a song by the Kinks. The tape was shipped to several different record labels without success. After releasing a final unsuccessful single on Intrepid Records in 1970 – including a cover of a song by the Easybeats as the A-side, "Gonna Have a Good Time Tonight" (which was a hit song for INXS many years later) – the band broke up for good.

== Musical highlights ==
The most renowned song in the Choir's catalogue is "It's Cold Outside", the A-side of their first single (although the single's B-side, "I'm Goin' Home", also has avid fans). The song was originally issued on the Canadian-American Records label in September 1966 but didn't take off until being leased to Roulette Records several months later. "It's Cold Outside" is an example of early power pop and, unlike many garage rock classics, is unabashedly Beatlesque, with fine songwriting and strong harmonies. One of the few covers of "It's Cold Outside" was released by Stiv Bators in 1979, the same year that the song was reissued on the Pebbles, Volume 2 LP. Although it had been a longtime favorite of Bators, the punk band the Dead Boys – which he had fronted earlier in the decade – had wanted to record their own version but were unable to figure out how to play it.

Due to the band's shifting line-up over the years, their remaining songs are varied in style and (according to some) somewhat uneven in quality. Don Krider, in a long article on The Choir, dubbed "I'd Rather You Leave Me" (written by Wally Bryson) "Raspberries '67 – it's that good!" Phil Giallombardo's song "Any Way I Can" is compared favorably with the Left Banke's "Walk Away Renee", while the Denny Carleton song "If These are Men" is termed "a wild, psychedelic '60s track (we're talking potential 'Austin Powers' material here)."

== Associated musicians ==
Besides competing head-to-head, Cleveland bands were frequently luring talented musicians from other groups in order to improve their sound. This is as true of The Choir as of any other band in the Cleveland area in that time period; as one reviewer put it: "The Choir turnstile saw the entrance and exit of a number of Cleveland's best musicians, including Dave Burke, Jim Skeen, Bob McBride, Randy Klawon, Rick Caon, Denny Carleton and Jim Anderson." Also, nearly every information source on the band cites a different list of musicians that had been in the group, and it would likely be impossible to follow each permutation of band members over the entire history of The Choir. However, some of the threads in the "family tree" of The Choir are outlined below, showing the other bands that the musicians in the group joined at one time or another. There are other connections that are not included in the list given below. For example, prior to joining the James Gang, Joe Walsh was the third member of Pie (with Phil Giallombardo and Jim Bonfanti) and the third member of the Power Trio (with Dann Klawon and Dave Burke). Another of Dann Klawon's projects was his band Peter Panic (1974–1980). They played locally, including at the Stables in Painsville, The Library on Prospect Ave in Cleveland, the Pirates Cove, the Cleveland Agora & Hennessy's in Lakewood. The original band featured many local musicians including founding members Steve Doman (lead vocals), Randy Klawon (Dann's brother) on lead guitar, Dan Klawon on bass, Dave Thomas (second guitar and vocals), and Todd Weaver on drums. After Doman left Peter Panic, Dave Thomas took over lead vocals and they were joined by Wally Bryson (Choir and Raspberries) and Rick Bell on sax (the Cleveland Horn, a.k.a. Michael Stanley, Lou Reed). Much like the Choir, various members left the band but returned during the course of the band's lifetime. The original Peter Panic performed covers of British rock while also covering many Motown and R&B classics, which made them a popular dance band in Northeast Ohio. They also opened for recently-gone-solo Eric Carmen at the old Agora and for Ted Nugent at the Allen Theater. A few line-up changes later, Peter Panic were headlining at the Cleveland Agora, January 1980, recorded by Agency Recording, and produced by Walt Maskey for his local M105 Radio presentation "Home Grown". The Agora show showcased many Dann Klawon originals, including "Restless" and "I Lost Your Love". It is unknown if any studio material was ever released from Peter Panic. The original group recorded an album for Epic in 1975, which has never been released. In 1977, minus Dave Thomas, who had moved to California, the remaining three original members backed Steve Doman on his single release of "Perennial Punk," a tongue-in-cheek critique of the burgeoning punk music scene.

- Dave Smalley – Raspberries, Dynamite, The Secret, solo artist.
- Wally Bryson – Raspberries, Cyrus Erie, Fotomaker, Fortega, Flyer, Tattoo, Peter Panic the News, the Secret, Fever, The Bryson Group, Sittin' Ducks.
- Jim Bonfanti – Raspberries, Pie, White Rain, Dynamite, Windfall, Obnoxious, Boxer.
- Dann Klawon – The Quick, Tattoo, Peter Panic, the Power Trio, the News, Sittin' Ducks.
- Dave Burke – The Power Trio.
- Phil Giallombardo – Pie, The James Gang.
- Randy Klawon – Cyrus Erie, the Quick, Moses, Peter Panic, the Window.
- Bob McBride – Cyrus Erie, the Quick.
- Rick Caon – The Castles, Sanctuary. The Grasshoppers and Leon and the Stormers. (The Grasshoppers included Ben Orr, who later joined The Cars as vocalist/bass player.)
- Denny Carleton – The Lost Souls, Moses, Milk, the Inner City, the Fa Band, the Pagans, the Window.
- Kenny Margolis – Cyrus Erie, Scarlet Fever, Sittin' Ducks.
- Dave Thomas - Tattoo, Peter Panic, Hot Shot
- Ricky Bell - Peter Panic, Michael Stanley, Lou Reed
- Todd Weaver - Peter Panic, Hot Shot
- Steve Doman - Peter Panic, Heaven, Gold Rush (Cleveland Plain Dealer Performer of the Year 1974)

== 2006 reunion ==
The Choir (2006 reunion)

Three of the members of The Choir played with a reunited Raspberries in late 2004 and often fielded requests for "It's Cold Outside". When The Choir decided to perform a reunion concert as well, there was enough demand for tickets that a second concert appearance was added. Thus, on March 3 and 4, 2006, as pictured, the band reunited for the first time since 1989 (and the first appearance in nearly 40 years for the original band members) for a two-night stand at Beachland Ballroom in Cleveland.

== Life away from the band ==
Dann Klawon lives in Painesville, Ohio and works as an electrical contractor; he also sings and plays piano at Lakeside Baptist Church there. Wally Bryson is a community employment specialist with the Cuyahoga County Board of Mental Retardation; he lives and works in Euclid, Ohio. Jim Bonfanti has an auto sales business in Mentor, Ohio. Dave Smalley is a respiratory therapist and lives in Arizona. Denny Carleton is a worship leader, and music teacher, at Mt. Carmel Church and School, in Wickliffe, Ohio and is also active in the Catholic Charismatic Renewal and as a Christian musician. Kenny Margolis is a lawyer and law professor at Case Western Reserve University School of Law.

== Retrospective albums ==
In 1976, Bomp! Records released a 5-song EP of unreleased songs by the band, called The Choir; it is still available on the label's website. In 1978, Bomp's first compilation LP, Best of Bomp Records, Volume 1, included one of these songs; this album was reissued on CD.

In 1994, a Choir retrospective album, called Choir Practice, was issued by Sundazed Music as an LP and a CD, featuring all 5 of the songs on the Bomp EP, along with many previously unreleased tracks.

Although Choir Practice omitted most of the tracks on the band's singles, the majority have been released on one or more compilation albums of garage rock and psychedelic rock music. For instance, "It's Cold Outside" was released on the landmark box set Nuggets: Original Artyfacts from the First Psychedelic Era, 1965-1968 (though not on the original double-LP release), along with the Pebbles, Volume 2 LP and CD. To date, both sides of the band's fifth single, along with "Changin' My Mind" from their fourth single, remain un-reissued.

Omnivore Recordings released two CDs of music by the Choir, Artifact: The Unreleased Album (2018), and Last Call: Live at the Music Box (2020).

== Members ==
=== The Mods (original line-up) ===
- Tom Boles — vocals
- Dave Smalley — guitar
- Dan Heckel — guitar
- Dann Klawon — drums

=== The Mods/The Choir (first single) ===
- Dave Smalley — lead vocals, rhythm guitar
- Dann Klawon – rhythm guitar
- Wally Bryson – lead guitar, bass, drums
- Dave Burke — bass, guitar
- Jim Bonfanti — drums, harmony vocals, tambourine.
- Doug Scher — keyboards

=== The Choir, 1967 (classic line-up, probably second and third singles, plus band photograph) ===
- Dave Smalley — vocals, rhythm guitar
- Wally Bryson – lead guitar, bass
- Jim Bonfanti — drums, vocals, tambourine
- Jim "Snake" Skeen — bass, guitar

=== 1968 re-formed line-up (unreleased album) ===
- Jim Bonfanti – drums
- Kenny Margolis – piano, vocals
- Phil Giallombardo – organ, vocals
- Denny Carleton – bass, vocals
- Randy Klawon – guitar, organ

=== 2006 reunion ===
- Dann Klawon — guitar
- Wally Bryson — guitar
- Jim Bonfanti — drums, vocals
- Dave Smalley — vocals, guitar
- Kenny Margolis — keyboards, vocals
- Dave Burke — bass

== Discography ==
=== Albums ===
- The Choir; Bomp Records – EP; released 1976
- Choir Practice; Sundazed Music – LP (#LP 5009); released 1994
- Choir Practice; Sundazed Music – CD (#SC 11018); released 1994
- Artifact: The Unreleased Album; Omnivore Recordings – CD; released 2018
- Last Call: Live at the Music Box; Omnivore Recordings – CD; released 2020

=== Singles ===
- "It's Cold Outside" b/w "I'm Goin' Home"; Canadian-American Records (#203); rel. 9/1966
- "It's Cold Outside" b/w "I'm Goin' Home"; Roulette Records (#R-4758); rel. 5/1967, US Billboard #68
- "No One Here to Play With" b/w "Don't You Feel a Little Sorry for Me"; Roulette Records (#R-4760); rel. 1967, US Cash Box #134
- "When You Were with Me" b/w "Changin' My Mind"; Roulette Records (#R-7005); rel. 1967
- "Gonna Have a Good Time Tonight" b/w "So Much Love"; Intrepid Records; rel. 1970

== Compilation appearances ==
"It's Cold Outside":

1. Nuggets: Original Artyfacts from the First Psychedelic Era, 1965–1968 (box set – CDs)
2. Excerpts from Nuggets (CD)
3. Pebbles, Volume 2 (LP and CD)
4. Pebbles, Volume 4 (CD – ESD Records)
5. Pebbles Box (box set – LPs)
6. Trash Box (box set – CDs)
7. Great Pebbles (CD)
8. Psychedelic Microdots, Volume 3 (CD)
9. The Pride of Cleveland Past (LP)

"I'm Going Home":

1. Pebbles, Volume 2 (CD only)
2. Best of Pebbles, Volume 2 (LP and CD)
3. Trash Box (box set – CDs)
4. Highs in the Mid-Sixties, Volume 9 (LP)
5. Psychedelic Microdots, Volume 3 (CD)

"Don't You Feel A Little Sorry For Me":

1. Psychedelic Microdots, Volume 3 (CD)

"No One Here To Play With":

1. Psychedelic Microdots, Volume 3 (CD)

"When You Were With Me":

1. Psychedelic Microdots, Volume 3 (CD)

"Any Way I Can":

1. Sundazed Sampler, Volume 1 (CD)

"I'd Rather You Leave Me":

1. Best of Bomp Records, Volume 1 (LP)
