= Choir Practice =

Compilation album by The Choir
- Released: 1994
- Recorded: 1966–1969
- Genre: Garage rock, rock and roll
- Length: 37:56 (LP)
- Label: Sundazed

Choir Practice is a retrospective album by the Choir that has been released in both LP and CD format.

== Release data ==
This album was released in 1994 by Sundazed Music as an LP (#LP-5009) and as a CD (#SC 11018).

== Notes on the tracks ==
This album was assembled by Bob Irwin and Jeff Jarema from a variety of sources. Most compilations of music by garage rock bands collect the singles and possibly an unreleased track or two. However, in this case, only their classic "It's Cold Outside" is included on this album; even the highly regarded flip side of this first single, "I'm Goin' Home", is omitted. Although the A-side of their fourth single, "When You Were with Me", is among the tracks, this is the original version of the song, before the record label added strings (which addition angered Wally Bryson at the time). The second, third and fifth singles, along with all of the B-sides, are not represented on this album.

== Track listing ==
=== LP ===
Side one

1. I'd Rather You Leave Me (Wally Bryson), 2:06
2. It's Cold Outside (Dann Klawon), 2:49
3. When You Were with Me (Wally Bryson), 2:32 – Unissued Version
4. Don't Change Your Mind (Wally Bryson/Dave Smalley), 1:51
5. Dream of One's Life (Jim Skeen), 3:27
6. In Love's Shadow (Dann Klawon), 2:41 – Demo by the Mods
7. I'm Slippin' (Dann Klawon), 2:52 – Demo by the Mods

Side two

1. Treeberry (Jim Skeen), 2:22
2. Smile (Dann Klawon), 2:45 – Demo
3. I Only Did it 'Cause I Felt So Lonely (Wally Bryson), 2:16
4. Anyway I Can (Phil Giallombardo), 3:50
5. Boris' Lament (Phil Giallombardo), 2:51
6. David Watts (Ray Davies), 2:34
7. If These Are Men (Denny Carleton), 3:00

=== CD ===
1. I'd Rather You Leave Me
2. It's Cold Outside
3. When You Were with Me (previously unissued)
4. Don't Change Your Mind (rehearsal version)
5. Dream of One's Life (previously unissued)
6. In Love's Shadow (Demo by the Mods/previously unissued)
7. I'm Slippin' (Demo by the Mods/previously unissued)
8. Leave Me Be (Demo by the Mods/previously unissued) – CD bonus track
9. I'd Rather You Leave Me (rehearsal version/previously unissued) – CD bonus track
10. Treeberry (rehearsal version/previously unissued)
11. Smile (previously unissued)
12. A to F (previously unissued) – CD bonus track
13. I Only Did It 'Cause I Felt So Lonely
14. Don't Change Your Mind – CD bonus track
15. Anyway I Can (previously unissued)
16. Boris' Lament (previously unissued)
17. David Watts (previously unissued)
18. If These Are Men (previously unissued)
