= Let's Pretend (Raspberries song) =

1973 single by Raspberries

Single by Raspberries

from the album Fresh
- B-side: "Every Way I Can"
- Released: March 1973
- Recorded: 1972
- Genre: Power pop
- Length: 2:51 (single version); 3:42 (album version)
- Label: Capitol
- Songwriter: Eric Carmen
- Producer: Jimmy Ienner

Raspberries singles chronology
"I Wanna Be with You" (1972)	"Let's Pretend" (1973)	"Tonight" (1973)

side label
- 45 RPM

"Let's Pretend" is a song by Raspberries, released in March 1973 as the second single from their second LP, Fresh. It was written by band leader Eric Carmen, who also provided the lead vocals.

The song reached the top 40 on three principal US charts, including at number 35 on the Billboard Hot 100, and number 14 on Record World. It was also a number 13 hit in Canada, becoming their second greatest hit in that country. The song spent 16 weeks on the Billboard chart, longer than any of their other singles except for their greatest hit, "Go All the Way", which lasted 18 weeks.

== Background ==
Eric Carmen stated that "Let's Pretend" was inspired by a cover photo in Time magazine of "a guy and girl dripping wet out in the woods" with a headline that was "something like 'Teenage Sex.'". Carmen said that it is one of the best melodies he has ever written, and that he reused part of it for his first solo hit, "All By Myself". He said the song lyrics about young people in love dreaming about eloping and making a life together are a recreation of the concept in Beach Boys' song "Wouldn't It Be Nice".

== Reception ==
Cash Box said that the "Raspberries change the pace a bit and deliver a strong semi-ballad with all the grace and capabilities of the Beatles early sound."

Rolling Stone rated it as the No. 36 "boy band song" of all time and said that the band "cranked up the romance notch to the max, unleashing a dreamy power-pop ballad complete with Eric Carmen’s swooning vocals about the night lasting forever."

Music journalist Ken Sharp rated it the Raspberries' 7th best song, comparing it to the "bittersweet ballads found on the Beach Boys' Pet Sounds" and calling it "one of Eric's most transcendent melodies." Ultimate Classic Rock critic Dave Swanson rated it as the Raspberries 5th best song, saying that it is "one of [the Raspberries'] most Beach Boys-inspired moments" and "about as perfect a pop song as you will likely ever stumble upon." Classic Rock History critic Brian Kachejian rated it as the Raspberries 8th best song, saying that it "defines the sweet side of Eric Carmen’s melodies and hooks."

Allmusic critic Mark Deming said that the song was "gush that's seasoned with a solid undertow of lust."

== Television performance ==
"Let's Pretend" was performed on The Midnight Special television program (season 1, episode 15) on May 4, 1973. The show was hosted by Johnny Nash.

== Later uses ==
"Let's Pretend" was included on the Raspberries Pop Art Live CD set from their reunion concert recording, November 26, 2004, at the House of Blues in Cleveland, Ohio, released August 18, 2017.

== Chart performance ==
=== Weekly charts ===
Chart (1973)	Peak position
Australia (Kent Music Report)	62
Canadian RPM Top Singles	13
US Billboard Hot 100	35
US Cash Box Top 100	18
US Record World	14

=== Year-end charts ===
Chart (1973)	Rank
Canada	169
US (Joel Whitburn's Pop Annual)	213

== Cover versions ==
- "Let's Pretend" was covered by the Bay City Rollers in 1976 on their album, Dedication.
- In 1978, the song was also done by Joey Travolta on his 1978 eponymous debut LP.
- The Lettermen included "Let's Pretend" in a medley with the Raspberries' first hit, "Don't Want to Say Goodbye" on their 1979 LP covering 1970s love songs entitled Love Is....

== Band members ==
- Eric Carmen – bass guitar, lead and backing vocals, piano
- Wally Bryson – lead guitar, backing and lead vocals
- Dave Smalley – rhythm guitar, backing and lead vocals
- Jim Bonfanti – drums, backing vocals
