= No (Bulldog song) =

Single by Bulldog

from the album Bulldog
- B-side: "Good Times Are Comin'" (US) "Rockin' Robin" (NZ)
- Released: October 1972 (U.S.)
- Recorded: 1972
- Genre: Boogie rock Blues rock
- Length: 2:34
- Label: Decca (US), MCA (NZ)
- Songwriters: Billy Hocher, John Turi
- Producer: Gene Cornish

"No" is a song by American pop-rock group Bulldog. It was the first release from their 1972 eponymous debut album. Vocals are provided by bassist Billy Hocher, with a sound similar to Joe Cocker.

The song became an international hit, reaching #44 in the U.S. and #63 in Canada. "No" did best in Australia and New Zealand, where it became a Top 20 hit. It also peaked at #2 on 2NUR (Sydney/Newcastle) in February 1973.

The album including "No" reached the Top 10 in Australia.

"No" was included on the 1972 K-Tel compilation album Believe in Music.

== Chart history ==
=== Weekly charts ===
Chart (1972–73)	Peak position
Australia (Go-Set)	15
Australia (Kent Music Report)	22
Canada RPM Top Singles	63
New Zealand (Listener)	17
U.S. Billboard Hot 100	44
U.S. Cash Box Top 100	51

=== Year-end charts ===
Chart (1972)	Rank
U.S. (Joel Whitburn's Pop Annual)	267

Chart (1973)	Rank
Australia	138
