= It's Cold Outside =

- 1966 Swedish picture sleeve.

Single by The Choir
- B-side: "Going Home"
- Released: September 1966; April 1967 (re-issue)
- Recorded: July 1966
- Genre: Garage rock
- Length: 2:49
- Label: Canadian-American; Roulette (re-issue)
- Songwriter: Dan Klawon

The Choir singles chronology
"It's Cold Outside" (1966)	"No One Here to Play With" (1967)

"It's Cold Outside" is a song by the American garage rock band the Choir, written by member Dann Klawon, and first released on Canadian-American Records in September 1966. It was later re-released in 1967 on Roulette, with Dann's last name incorrectly spelled "Klawson". The song is considered a classic of the musical genre of garage rock, and became the group's only national hit. The song has since been featured on several compilation albums. At the time of the recording, the band consisted of: Wally Bryson - lead guitar, Dave Smalley - guitar/vocals, Dave Burke - bass, Jim Bonfanti - drums, and Dann Klawon - multiple instruments/vocals. The group changed members over the years, but Bryson, Smalley and Bonfanti would team up with songwriter Eric Carmen a few years later, and form the power pop group Raspberries.

== Background ==
The Choir originally came to prominence in Cleveland under the moniker the Mods, covering a wide variety of material penned by British Invasion-based groups such as the Who, the Rolling Stones, and the Beatles. As the house band for the Painesville Armory, the group appeared on several local television programs, emulating a pop sound inspired by the songs they covered. By 1966, the band members developed into capable songwriters, writing the originals "It's Cold Outside" and "Going Home". With their freshly-penned material in hand, the Mods traveled to Chicago to record. Around the same time, the band changed their name to the Choir because the Modernaires were recording under the name "the Mods."

The song's lyrics pertain to a dejected recounting of a failed love affair, though the vocal delivery is conducted in a sunny manner. Klawon explains "I used to write quite a bit then, and one day I was thinking of some sort of theme to use with the moon/spoon, boy/girl lyrics," before deciding "to go with a weather analogy". Also evident are the soothing vocal harmonies and fast-paced rhythm guitar instrumentals, both reminiscent of early Beatles and Who compositions. In addition to the British Invasion-influenced arrangements, "It's Cold Outside" is also marked by Dave Burke's raving bass playing and lead guitarist Wally Bryson's jangling Byrds-esque technique. Music historian Richie Unterberger, writing for the Allmusic website, proposes the tune would have been better suited for "the innocent times of 1964 than for the complicated culture and music scene of 1967".

== Chart performance ==
Upon its release in September 1966, "It's Cold Outside" drew little attention. However, in April 1967 the single was re-issued on Roulette Records and went to No. 1 on WHK, WKYC and WIXY, all Top 40 radio stations in Cleveland, retaining the position for five weeks. Nationally, the record peaked at No. 49 in Record World, No. 55 in Cash Box and No. 68 on the Billboard Hot 100. "It's Cold Outside" gained more attention from garage rock enthusiasts years later when it was compiled on Pebbles, Volume 2 and the 1998 reissue of Nuggets: Original Artyfacts from the First Psychedelic Era, 1965–1968. Other albums that feature the song include Psychedelic Microdots, Volume 3, Choir Practice, and Trash Box.

== Later uses ==
"It's Cold Outside" was included on the Raspberries Pop Art Live CD set from their reunion concert recording, November 26, 2004, at the House of Blues in Cleveland, Ohio, released August 18, 2017.

== Chart history ==
Chart (1967)	Peak position
Canada RPM Top Singles	59
U.S. Billboard Hot 100	68
U.S. Cash Box Top 100	55
U.S. Record World	49

== Other versions ==
- In 1976, the power-pop band Tattoo released a cover version of the song as a B-side opener on their self-titled album. Tattoo included songwriter Dann Klawon and former Choir guitarist Wally Bryson. This version includes the "missing" second verse, that was not on the 45 RPM single. "Tattoo" is Prodigal Records P6-10014S1, and has the words to the songs on the back of the album cover.
- In 1979, Stiv Bators of Dead Boys and The Lords of the New Church released a cover version of the song as a single A-side.
- In 1987, Hard-Ons covered the song on a compilation album "Hot For Your Love, Baby".
- In 1990, the Finnish punk rock collaboration Ne Luupojat Surf covered the song with original Finnish lyrics titled "Vaikka kylmää on" on their three-song Christmas seven inch "Kaikki Uskoo Joulupukkiin."
- In 2002, The Queers covered the song on their "Pleasant Screams" album
- In 2019, the Finnish duo collaboration Local Al & Mummypowder covered the song as a stream-only single release featuring Finnish lyrics by Ne Luupojat Surf.
- In 2019, a later version of The Choir, with Dann's brother Randy on guitar, recorded "Last Call - Live at The Music Box" in Cleveland, OH. This 2-CD set has an alternate version of the song on Disc 2.
