= Come Inside =

Finnish rock/pop band

- Origin: Helsinki, Finland
- Genres: Glam rock britpop indie rock
- Years active: 1996–2000?
- Labels: Stupido Twins
- Members: Mikko Sippola (vocals); Junnu Alajuuma (guitar); Matti Salovaara (guitar); Jotti Taival (bass); Oskari "Ose" Vilmunen (drums); Ville Alajuuma (keyboards)
- Past members: Sampsa Kaukua

Come Inside is a Finnish glam rock, brit pop and indie rock band founded in 1996 at the Alppila Senior High in Helsinki, Finland. Though Sippola writes the band's lyrics in fluent English, the band remains mostly unknown outside of Finland, where they had several top-20 records.

The band comprised Mikko Sippola (vocals), Junnu Alajuuma (guitar), Sampsa Kaukua (guitar), Jotti Taival (bass) and Oskari "Ose" Vilmunen (drums), who first met each other in the aforementioned high school and subsequently decided to form a band. According to their own words, their first-hand contact to music was playing e.g. "Rage Against the Machine, Red Hot Chili Peppers, Hendrix and Stevie Wonder" together.

Later, during the recording sessions for their second album Fearless, guitarist Kaukua left the band and was replaced by Matti Salovaara (guitar). Around the same time, the band's sound was further augmented by Junnu's little brother Ville (keyboards).

== First Steps or Chewin' Tobacco Fish Deedle ==
While the band was recording their first demo tape, they had not yet come to decide upon a name for the band. When asked, they would answer with "Chewin' Tobacco Fish Deedle". Their first demo was recorded in a space provided by their school. As would be obvious from their list of influences, the style and quality of their early material swung wildly: "Behind That Door, on the other hand, sounds like bad European reggae," proclaimed one Finnish reviewer.

== Mosaic ==
The band ended up - after bidding from several labels - making a record deal with the Stupido Records/Twin Tone label in the early summer of 1997, after having won the Ääni ja Vimma band review the same year. For their first album's recording sessions - and to the shock and surprise of the band - metal producer Mikko Karmila, who has worked, among other bands, with Nightwish and Sentenced was attached.

Soon it became obvious, however, that Karmila's touch would yield a solid, mature glam-tinged first album. The first singles off the album - now peculiarly called Mosaic, much unlike the quality of the album - Celebrate and "She Wants" made the official Finnish single charts with both breaking the top 20 - simultaneously.

== Fearless ==
Though the band would only take two years between Mosaic and the follow-up, internally the band was undergoing discussions regarding their strongly guitar-leaning sound they felt was affecting their songwriting and improvisation adversely. Out of this was borne the electronic, dance-oriented single "Jinx" (1998), possibly an attempt to avoid classification and to try something new before the usual difficult second album.

Against this backdrop the next album's broader canvas of sound and easygoing indie-type playing (completely unlike their previous single) was a love child of labour. The band worked long and hard with producer Nick Triani of Treeball and recorder Tom Nyman, eventually releasing the polished and critically well-accepted second album "Fearless" in the year 2000.

Especially the guitar playing on the album was paid attention to, with one critic drawing parallels to Suede: "Junnu Alajuuma's Bernard Butler-affected joyful playing is fearless, majestic and actually a deciding factor in Come Inside's overall sound." (transl.) Another critic would simply exclaim "Come Inside is got [sic] damn better than Suede."

A retro-themed record release party gig at the Tavastia Club in Helsinki on 6.4-2000 with lavish disco-ball installations and propaganda films was a success in the minds of the band, but after this the band would only play some more festival gigs over the course of the summer of 2000. Two singles were released off the album, the album-type track "Walk On" and the sonically sugar sweet but lyrically laconic "Follow Me", on which Sippola sings "I fell down the stairs, oh god, it's super!".

== Aftermath ==
There have been regular rumours of the band's return, and in the past some band members have answered inquiries at the Stupido Twins message boards about returning to music in a reservedly optimistic manner. Like so many other bands, Come Inside have seemingly had both personal and artistic difficulties since the release of Fearless and it seems the band has split up for good.

== Trivia ==
- The band members did not call the band by any name at first, and when asked, they said they were called the 'Chewin' Tobacco Fish Deedle'. This dadaistic response can be found on a released album track as well.
- 1997 Winners of the Ääni ja Vimma band contest.
- 1997 Record deal with Stupido Twins.
- 1998 Jyrki Hit Challenge Awards: Winners of the Most Exportable Band. The band considered this something of a consolation prize even though at the time, the Hit Challenge was the biggest national pop/rock event on Finnish television.
- 1998 The video to the Hold Me Now single deals with adult entertainment and caused a bit of a stir, eventually shown censored only on the television show Jyrki. Director Pete Riski received an honorary mention of the video at the 1998 Oulu Music Video Festival.

=== Member activity outside Inside ===
Junnu has been involved in bands such as The Flaming Sideburns, Miss Treatment and Spanish Harlem. His brother Ville has played briefly in Treeball and Mummypowder.

== Discography ==
=== Albums ===
- Mosaic (1998) (Twin 40)
- Fearless (2000) (Twin 48)

=== Singles ===
- Celebrate (1998) (Stupido 38)
- She Wants (1998) (Stupido 39)
- Jinx (1998) (Stupido 42)
- Walk On (2000) (Stupido 49)
- Follow Me (2000) (Stupido 50)

=== Compilations ===
- Stupido 10 (1993) (Track 02, Jinx)
