= Ääni ja Vimma =

Ääni ja Vimma (meaning in Finnish "The Sound and the Fury") is a popular annual band competition in Finland. It was founded in 1996.

Current rules require that band members be between age 15 and 25 and that the bands have not released an album or have a record deal. Since 2000, a youth competition called Junior Ääni ja Vimma has also been held for those under the age of 15.

The winners of the competition do not automatically obtain a record deal, but the high-profile of the competition in Finland has led to winners getting record contracts, including bands such as 2009's winners Wedding Crashers, and 1997's Come Inside.
