= Ecstasy (Raspberries song) =

Single by Raspberries

from the album Side 3
- B-side: "Don't Want to Say Goodbye"
- Released: February 1974
- Genre: Power pop
- Length: 3:37
- Label: Capitol
- Songwriter(s): Eric Carmen
- Producer(s): Jimmy Ienner

Raspberries singles chronology
"I'm a Rocker" (1973)	"Ecstasy" (1974)	"Overnight Sensation (Hit Record)" (1974)

"Ecstasy" is a song written by Eric Carmen that was first released by the Raspberries on their 1973 album Side 3. It was also released as a single but did not chart.

== Background ==
Carmen said "Ecstasy" had a "Who/Small Faces feel" although on songs from Side 3 like "Ecstasy" and "Tonight" he felt that the band was able to be the Raspberries without being derivative of influences like the Who and the Beatles. "Ecstasy" was drummer Jim Bonfanti's favorite Raspberries' song, particularly because he "really got to let loose and play" and guitarist Wally Bryson similarly said that it was one of the greatest things the Raspberries had done.

Anderson Daily Bulletin critic Randall L. Rohn described the song as starting with "very Who-ish" drums and guitars, similar to "The Kids Are Alright." Rohn said that "The band breaks into a three-part, almost syrupy-sweet chorus as the guitars and drumming churn stronger and stronger in the background. The decibel level builds until the song climaxes with a single, subdued guitar chord."

== Reception ==
Cash Box called "Ecstasy" a "melodic gem" with an "appetizing mixture of smooth harmony and driving rhythm" and a "superb lead guitar break." Record World said of "Ecstasy" that "With vocal harmonies reminiscent of Beatle days and gutsy, driving guitar work, this Jimmy Jenner-produced masterpiece is a monster from the word go" and that the "tune molds vocals and instrumentals in a manner that belies its hard rock sound." Rohn regarded it as the best song on Side 3.

Music journalist Ken Sharp rated it the Raspberries 2nd best song, saying that "the Who are clearly the model for this perfect union of power and pop, a number one hit in a better universe." Sharp also praised Wally Bryson's guitar playing on the song, as well as Jim Bonfanti's "brilliant Keith Moon-styled drum orgasim in the bridge." Allmusic critic Mark Deming said that "on 'Ecstasy,' the whole band delivers a loving mash note to the Who." The Guardian critic Michael Hann said that it "sounds as if [the Raspberries] had finally achieved their aim of melding the Who and the Beach Boys."

Ultimate Classic Rock critic Dave Swanson rated it as the Raspberries' 3rd best song, just ahead of "Tonight". Swanson said that it "has the heavier riff [than 'Tonight'] and the reckless abandon bridge that gives the Who a run for their money." Swanson also praised Bonfanti's Keith Moon-style drumming and Bryson's "blistering" guitar solo at the end of the song.

"Ecstasy" has appeared on several Raspberries compilation albums and a live version was included on Carmen's solo compilation album The Essential Eric Carmen.
