= The Quid =

- Origin: Winnipeg, Manitoba, Canada
- Genre: Garage rock
- Years active: 1964–1970s
- Past members: Lenny Fidkalo; Ron Rene; Bill Pavlik; Colin Palmer; Morley Nickles

The Quid was a Canadian garage rock band from Winnipeg, Manitoba, active during the 1960s and 1970s.

== History ==
The Quid was formed in 1964 in Winnipeg by musicians who were performing at the Twilight teen club. The original band members included Ron Rene, Bill Pavlik, Colin Palmer, Al Johnson, and Morley Nickles. They were the featured band on the compilation album Winnipeg 1965–66.

Johnson left the band and was replaced by Lenny Fidkalo.

In 1966, the band released a single, "Crazy Things", on Eagle Records. It reached just #100. It was included as a bonus track on the CD reissue of the early garage rock compilation album Pebbles, Volume 2. Their next single "Lover, Lover" also charted on the Canadian Top 100 at #88.

A 1980s concert in Winnipeg called "Shakin' All Over" brought the Quid together with other notable acts from the Winnipeg scene, including Neil Young, Randy Bachman, C. F. "Fred" Turner of Bachman Turner Overdrive (BTO), and Burton Cummings of the Guess Who. Later in the decade, after Rene left the band, the others recruited singer Bobby Barton, but soon disbanded.

In the fall of 2007, Ron Rene (real name Ron Kreshka) died in Vancouver of a heart attack.
