= Dino Danelli =

American drummer (1944–2022)

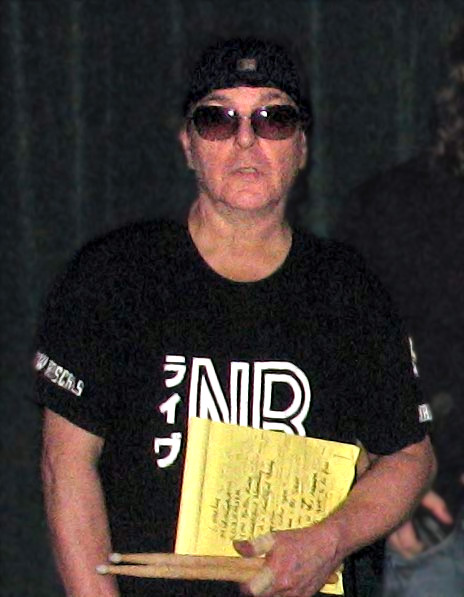
- Danelli in 2010

Background information
- Born: Robert Daniel; July 23, 1944; Jersey City, New Jersey, U.S.
- Died: December 15, 2022 (aged 78) New York City, U.S.
- Genres: Rock, soul, blue-eyed soul
- Occupation: Musician
- Instruments: Drums, percussion
- Years active: 1965–2022
- Formerly of: The Rascals, Fotomaker, Little Steven and the Disciples of Soul, New Rascals

Dino Danelli (born Robert Daniel; July 23, 1944 – December 15, 2022) was an American drummer. Danelli was best known as an original member and the drummer in the rock group the Young Rascals. He has been called "one of the great unappreciated rock drummers in history". He was inducted into the Rock and Roll Hall of Fame in 1997 with the (Young) Rascals.

After the Rascals split up in 1972, Danelli formed the group Bulldog. Soon after, he and former Rascal Gene Cornish formed the band Fotomaker with Wally Bryson of Raspberries. Danelli died on December 15, 2022.

== Early life ==
Danelli was born Robert Daniel to father Steven Daniel and mother Teresa Bottinelli in Jersey City, New Jersey, Danelli was a jazz drummer by training. He had played with Lionel Hampton and, by 1961, was playing R&B in New Orleans. He returned to New York in 1962 with a band called Ronnie Speeks & the Elrods. He also worked at times with such legendary performers as Little Willie John.

Danelli met Eddie Brigati (a pickup singer on the local R&B circuit), and Felix Cavaliere (a classically trained pianist) in 1963. Later that year, Danelli and Cavaliere traveled to Las Vegas to try their luck with a casino house band. They remained there until early 1964, but then returned to New York City.

== The Rascals ==
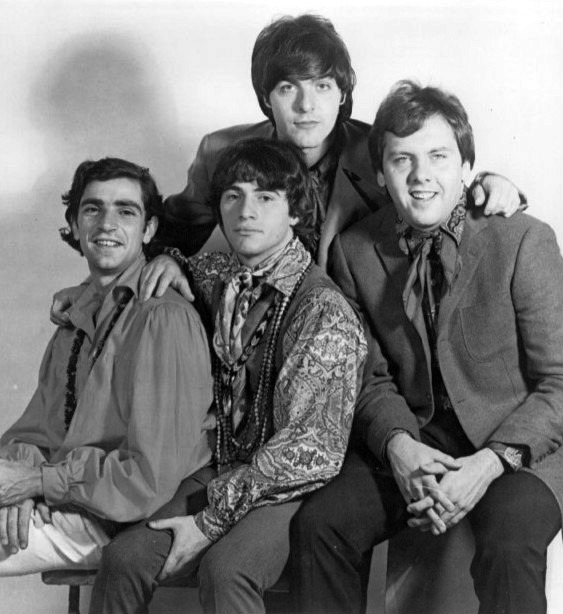
Danelli (standing in the back) with the Rascals in 1969

In late 1964, Danelli teamed with Cavaliere, Brigati, and a Canadian-born guitarist named Gene Cornish to form the Young Rascals. Cavaliere and Danelli traveled to Las Vegas in January 1963–1964 to back up singer Sandu Scott and her Scottys, but returned to NYC in February 1964. That month they debuted with the Young Rascals at the Choo Choo Club in Garfield, New Jersey.

In addition to playing drums (before Cavaliere and Brigati began composing original music), Danelli and Cavaliere often scouted new repertory that the group could perform. In a 1988 interview, he cited their trips to record stores as yielding such songs as "Mustang Sally" and "Good Lovin'." He was with the Rascals for seven years (1965–1972) and performed on three No. 1 hits.

After performing with Cavaliere and Cornish at the Atlantic Records 40th Anniversary concert on 14 May 1988, there was a short-lived Rascals reunion tour later that year without Brigati. All four original members came together to perform at their induction to the Rock and Roll Hall of Fame in 1997 and then once again on 24 April 2010, for the Kristen Ann Carr Fund dinner at the Tribeca Grill in Tribeca, New York City.

He reunited with his bandmates. The Rascals appeared at the Capitol Theatre in Port Chester, New York, for six shows in December 2012 and for fifteen dates at the Richard Rogers Theatre on Broadway (April 15 – May 5, 2013). Their production, entitled 'Once Upon A Dream', toured North America (Toronto, Los Angeles, San Francisco, Phoenix, Chicago, Detroit, Rochester, and New York City).

== Bulldog and after ==
Along with Cornish, Danelli formed the group Bulldog in 1972 and they produced two albums ("Bulldog", Decca 1972 and "Smasher" Buddah 1974) and the 1972 hit single "No" before disbanding in 1975. Danelli joined the Leslie West Band for a short time along with bassist Busta Jones. Danelli and Cornish then joined the group Fotomaker in 1978 (initially with ex-Raspberries member Wally Bryson). By 1980, Danelli joined Steven Van Zandt as a member of Little Steven & The Disciples of Soul.

In 1999, Danelli produced a series of tracks for New York singer-songwriter Roxanne Fontana, which were released as an album entitled Love Is Blue on Etoile Records.

He was also a visual artist, and designed album covers for The Rascals and Little Steven & the Disciples of Soul.

== Death ==
Danelli died at age 78 from coronary artery disease and congestive heart failure on December 15, 2022, at a rehabilitation facility in Manhattan after a period of declining health.

A tribute concert was held in May 2023.
