= Fotomaker =

American power pop band

- Origin: Long Island, New York, U.S.
- Genres: power pop
- Years active: 1977-1979
- Past members: Gene Cornish; Dino Danelli; Frankie Vinci; Wally Bryson; Lex Marchesi

Fotomaker was a power pop group from Long Island, New York who released three albums between 1978 and 1979.

== History ==
The band was formed in 1977 by bassist Gene Cornish and drummer Dino Danelli, former members of The Rascals (although Cornish was guitarist for the group). Soon, guitarist/vocalist Wally Bryson, (formerly of the Raspberries) was added, alongside guitarist/vocalist Lex Marchesi and keyboardist/vocalist Frankie Vinci. Fotomaker debuted at the newly remodeled Cleveland Agora in early 1978.

Fotomaker's debut release, titled Fotomaker, was released on February 28, 1978 on Atlantic Records. The LP was produced and engineered by Eddie Kramer, Ron Albert, and Howard Albert. The lead single release, "Where Have You Been All My Life", reached #81 on the Billboard Hot 100. The song was included on the Rhino Record's compilation LP Poptopia! Power Pop Classics Of The '70s, alongside singles by other prominent power pop artists including Badfinger, Raspberries, Cheap Trick, and The Knack.

The second album, Vis-a-Vis, was released in October, 1978. It was recorded at the Record Plant New York studios (used by the Raspberries) that summer at Wally Bryson's suggestion. Vis-a-Vis opened with Vinci's song "Miles Away", which was released as a single and peaked at number 63 on the Billboard Hot 100.

Wally Bryson had already left the band before the band's third album, Transfer Station, released in 1979. Fotomaker did not tour in support of Transfer Station. The album failed to reach the charts, and the group disbanded shortly afterwards.

== Post-Fotomaker careers ==
In 1997, Gene Cornish and Dino Danelli, along with former Rascals bandmates Felix Cavaliere and Eddie Brigati, were inducted into the Rock and Roll Hall of Fame.

Wally Bryson returned home to Cleveland early 1979, joining Dann Klawon's band "Peter Panic". Bryson has also collaborated with his son Jesse, in The Bryson Group.

Frankie Vinci has done plenty of TV work, including jingles and music for the Super Bowl, and has written songs for others such as country artist Tim McGraw. He also wrote songs for the 1983 summer camp slasher film Sleepaway Camp.

== Discography ==
=== Albums ===
Title	Year
Fotomaker	1978
Vis-à-vis	1978
Transfer Station	1979

Singles

Title	Year
"Where Have You Been All My Life"	1978
"The Other Side"	1978
"Miles Away"	1979
