= I Wanna Be with You (Raspberries song) =

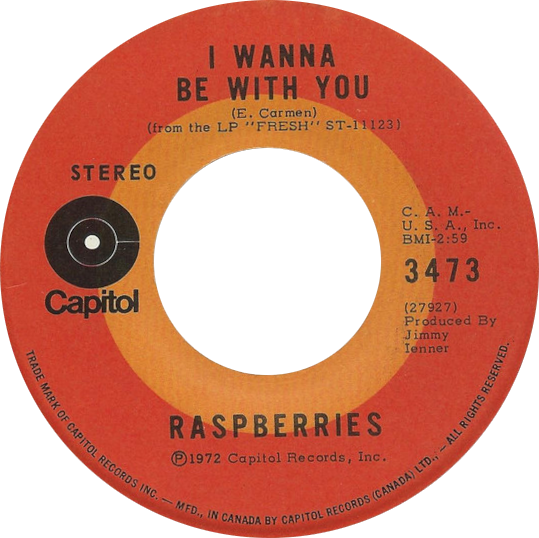
- Side A of the Canadian single

Single by Raspberries

from the album Fresh
- B-side: "Goin' Nowhere Tonight"
- Released: November 1972
- Recorded: January 1972 Abbey Road studios
- Genre: Jangle pop; power pop
- Length: 3:05
- Label: Capitol
- Songwriter: Eric Carmen
- Producer: Jimmy Ienner

Raspberries singles chronology
"Go All the Way" (1972)	"I Wanna Be with You" (1972)	"Let's Pretend" (1973)

Audio
- "I Wanna Be with You" on YouTube

"I Wanna Be with You" is a song by Raspberries, released in November 1972 as the first single from their second LP, Fresh. It was written by band leader Eric Carmen, who also provided the lead vocals. It became their second greatest US hit.

== Background ==
Carmen said that he based the song on the guitar part on Todd Rundgren's "Couldn't I Just Tell You" after Carmen felt that Rundgren had incorporated aspects of the Raspberries' song "I Can Remember" into his songs "I Saw the Light" and "It Wouldn't Have Made Any Difference".

The song reached the top 40 on three principal US charts, including number 16 on the Billboard Hot 100, number 10 on Cash Box, and number 7 on Record World. It was also a number 17 hit in Canada.

== Reception ==
Billboard called it a "strong rock ballad." Cash Box described it as sounding "similar to the Beatles vocally." Record World felt it was "a candidate for the next number one record" and "the kind of record Paul [McCartney] should be doing." AllMusic critic Mark Deming called it "a work-of-genius pop single."

Ultimate Classic Rock critic Dave Swanson rated it as the Raspberries 2nd best song, calling it "a powerhouse rock and roller that uncorks like a mound of caffeine" and noting that the "urgent machine gun like snare drum opening grabs the listener's ears as the jangling guitars chime in to let us know the Raspberries are at it again." Music journalist Ken Sharp rated it the Raspberries' 4th greatest song, describing it as "Lesley Gore meets the Byrds."

Bassist Scott McCall, who joined the Raspberries after this song was released, rated it as the greatest power pop song of all time, saying that when he first heard it "[he] almost fainted right then and there, it was SO GOOD."

== Television performance ==
"I Wanna Be with You" was performed on The Midnight Special television program (season 1, episode 15) on May 4, 1973. The show was hosted by Johnny Nash.

== Later uses ==
"I Wanna Be with You" was included on the Raspberries Pop Art Live CD set from their reunion concert recording, November 26, 2004, at the House of Blues in Cleveland, Ohio, released August 18, 2017.

== Chart performance ==
=== Weekly charts ===
Chart (1972–73)	Peak position
Australia (Kent Music Report)	44
Canadian RPM Top Singles	17
US Billboard Hot 100	16
US Cash Box Top 100	10
US Record World	7

=== Year-end charts ===
Chart (1973)	Rank
Canada	142
US Cash Box Top 100	100

== Band members ==
- Eric Carmen – bass guitar, lead and backing vocals, piano
- Wally Bryson – lead guitar, backing and lead vocals
- Dave Smalley – rhythm guitar, backing and lead vocals
- Jim Bonfanti – drums, backing vocals

== Bibliography ==
- Borack, John M. (2007). Shake Some Action: The Ultimate Power Pop Guide. Not Lame Recordings. ISBN 978-0-9797714-0-8.
