= Starting Over (Raspberries album) =

Studio album by Raspberries
- Released: September 16, 1974
- Recorded: April 1974
- Studio: Record Plant Studios, New York City
- Genre: Power pop; rock and roll; hard rock
- Length: 40:00
- Label: Capitol
- Producer: Jimmy Ienner

Raspberries chronology
Side 3 (1973)	Starting Over (1974)	Raspberries' Best (1976)

Professional ratings
Review scores
Source	Rating
AllMusic	3.5/5 stars
Tom Hull	A−
The Village Voice	A−

Starting Over is the fourth and final studio album by the 1970s power pop band Raspberries. It peaked at No. 143 on the Billboard pop album chart in 1974. Rolling Stone named it its rock record album of the year for 1974. The LP generated the #18 Billboard pop single "Overnight Sensation (Hit Record)", while a second single, "Cruisin' Music", did not chart. This was the first album by the Raspberries to feature songs with profanity. Those songs were "Starting Over", which featured the word "fucking" once, and the song "Party’s Over", which featured the word "shit" twice.

== Background ==
Stylistically, Starting Over represented a more aggressive arena rock/hard rock sound than previous albums in a way reminiscent of The Who, which was one of the groups' biggest influences. The album also included softer ballads such as "Rose Coloured Glasses" and "Cry".

Starting Over featured a new line-up with Michael McBride (drums), who had drummed with Carmen and Bryson in their previous band in the late '60s, Cyrus Erie, and Scott McCarl (bass, vocals). Drummer Jim Bonfanti and bassist Dave Smalley had left the band the previous year.

Bruce Springsteen's drummer Max Weinberg has said that he based his early drum style (particularly on the Springsteen album Darkness on the Edge of Town) on Raspberries drummer Michael McBride's work in this album, while Springsteen himself has also mentioned several times in live performances that the title track is one of the greatest pop songs ever written.

John Lennon, a Raspberries fan, particularly liked the song "Overnight Sensation". He was present for part of the recording of the Starting Over LP and, although not credited on the LP, is rumored to have assisted with the mix, including "Overnight Sensation".

Critic Mark Deming of AllMusic praised the album as "a fine farewell from one of the best American pop bands of their era, though they didn't know it would be their last album when they were making it." Billboard said that it was "probably the strongest overall effort yet from this band. thematically and musically" and rated "Overnight Sensation (Hit Record)", "Play On", "I Don't Know What I Want", "I Can Hardly Believe You're Mine" and "Starting Over" as the best cuts.

Several critics have described Starting Over as a concept album. Music critic Dave Marsh said that it "is, obviously, a concept album" with side one "chronicles the group's disillusionment with the music, and the music business, as a way out of the daily grind" while both sides "are an expression of the group's eclecticism, which allows them to use the style of almost any contemporary rock artist for a song." Gazette-Mail critic James Carnes noted that all the songs on the album concern life in a rock group. According to Carnes, "side one tackles the professional aspect of a band" while "side two deals with the many aspects of love." Music critic Ron Ross said that "the first side of Starting Over is conceptual in the sense that all the Raspberry writers had been thinking along the same thematic lines in the past year and it seemed smart to sequence the tunes that dealt with their creeping disillusionment."

This album was re-released on CD as part of Power Pop Volume 2, which also contains their album Side 3.

== Songs ==
Music journalist Ken Sharp rated the title track as the Raspberries' 9th best song, describing it as "Raspberries do Elton, with sublime vocals." Classic Rock History critic Brian Kachejian rated it as the band's 4th best song, noting that the piano riff has some similarities to Elton John's "Tiny Dancer". This was also Axl Rose's favorite Raspberries song. In 1975 Marsh described it as "a marvelous ballad, somewhat in the tradition of the Beach Boys but ultimately reminscent, in a contemporary context, of Elton John at his best. Ross said that he believes that in the song "Carmen's eclecticism gets the best of him", saying that it "would make the same kind of sentimental soppy single as Elton John's 'Your Song.'" Carmen said that he wrote it as a song about a relationship, but it could be taken as a reference to the revised band and a new beginning for it. Carmen also said that it had the best ending of any song he had written. Deming felt that it "anticipates the grandiose tone of Carmen's later solo work." A live version of the song performed solo by Eric Carmen was released on Carmen's The Essential Eric Carmen.

Both Ultimate Classic Rock critic Dave Swanson and Kachejian rated "I Don't Know What I Want" as being among the Raspberries' Top 10 songs. Swanson said it was "probably the band's heaviest moment" with lyrics that "perfectly capture youthful frustration." Kachejian noted some similarity to the Who's "Won't Get Fooled Again", especially in the intro. Edmonton Journal critic Joe Sornberger described it as ""the Raspberry recreation of the Who's unique brand of electric confusion," noting the resemblance to "Won't Get Fooled Again" but also discerning elements from "I Can See for Miles" and "a bunch of other Who melodies and phrases." Deming called it a "superb Who pastiche". Rolling Stone critic Ken Barnes went further, calling it "the ultimate Who tribute, a superbly integrated pastiche of Who styles, 1965-71" and saying that "Fragments of Townshend melodies surface here and there, and Eric Carmen's vocal is an uncanny Roger Daltrey imitation. Yet the song stands on its own merits as a modern teenage frustration classic." Barnes also called the song "astonishing" and better than anything the Who had done recently. Ross called it "the meatiest beatiest Who-snatch since the Move's early singles. The Record critic Rick Atkinson wrote that "Throughout the entire song you marvel at the vocal resemblance to Roger Daltrey, and the resemblance is abetted by the crisp, Who-like instrumentation. Music journalist John M. Borack rated it as one of the best songs Carmen wrote, and also described the song as being "Who-ish". Music critic Anastasia Pantsios criticized the song for being too similar to "Won't Get Fooled Again" but felt it was redeemed by the lyrics about "a teenage dilemma: intense, nervous desire but not knowing in what manner or how." Carmen said "It was pretty much an homage to the Who. The lyric was really kind of a teen frustration anthem. It was supposed to be a song to show off [Wally Bryson's] power chords, [Mike McBride's] drumming and the lyrics."

Guitarist Wally Bryson wrote the song "Party's Over" and said that he included a veiled reference to Smalley and Bonfanti leaving. He said that "I had to. I didn't want to. It really broke my heart." Deming called it "Bryson's rollicking elegy for the band's first lineup." Carmen called "Party's Over" "Wally's autobiographical three-chord rocker." Borack described it as an "autobiographical Free-like stomper" and called it "a storming kiss-off to one of the finest power pop bands ever." Sornberger described it as a "Rolling Stones 'Honky Tonk Woman' style tune." Pantsios described it as being "a pretty fair song out of the Stones/Free tradition [Bryson] admires", with a "raw vocal that belies [Bryson's] sensitivity" and an "immediate musical impact [that] weights his funkier side. Ross said it was "delightfully dumb and right on."

McCarl rated "Play On", which he co-wrote with Eric Carmen, as the 5th greatest power pop song. He said that "Eric and I wrote this one nose to nose. All I had was the title, the opening riff and a couple of lines to kick it off, and look at it now! It's everything I'd hoped to bring to the new band. I give it the goose-bump test from time to time, and it still passes!" Sharp rated it as the Raspberries' 8th best song, calling it "the perfect caustic marriage of Scott McCarl's caustic Lennon to Eric's sugar-sweet McCartney, and what a bridge!" Barnes said that "Play On" has "captivating harmonies over high-voltage rocking." Sornberger described it as "a very Beatle-ish heavy rocker." Pantsios described it as "an ass-kicker with a sweet edge to it." Ross considered "Play On" to be the most significant song on Starting Over because it indicated what he felt was the likely future direction of the Raspberries. Ross said of it:

Scott [McCarl] sings with surprising assurance of the torn fingers and throats endured when you spend "every night in a different bed." The youthful sexual intensity of "Play On" is underscored by a jangling John Lennon guitar riff countered by a beautifully harmonized chorus that is a ray of idealism bursting through clouds of fatigue. Scott sounds jaded before he's even had that Hit Record; cool, huh? You oughta see him sing it; shy and sure, all at once.

Sornberger described the single "Cruisin' Music" as a "Beach Boys tribute, an ode to the car radio, surfin' and foolin' around." Carmen agreed, saying of it that "To me the song was nothing more than my ultimate Beach Boys tribute. It was a song probably conceived on one of those days when I was driving down the street in the summertime and probably heard 'Don't Worry Baby.'" Ross called it "Carmen's blockbuster on side two" and "better than Colombian coffee to wake up to." Record Collector contributor Jeanette Leech rated it as one of the 10 best Beach Boys tribute songs. Pantsios considered it an "ordinary" song in the early Beach Boys style.

== Track listing ==
All lead vocals and songs by Eric Carmen unless otherwise stated.

Side One
No.	Title	Writer(s)	Lead Vocals	Length
1.	"Overnight Sensation (Hit Record)"			5:34
2.	"Play On"	Carmen, Scott McCarl	McCarl	3:01
3.	"Party's Over"	Wally Bryson	Bryson	3:14
4.	"I Don't Know What I Want"			4:13
5.	"Rose Coloured Glasses"	McCarl	McCarl	3:38

Side Two
No.	Title	Writer(s)	Lead Vocals	Length
6.	"All Through the Night"	Carmen, Michael McBride		4:30
7.	"Cruisin Music"			3:09
8.	"I Can Hardly Believe You're Mine"	Carmen, McCarl		3:34
9.	"Cry"	Carmen, McCarl	McCarl	2:41
10.	"Hands on You"	Bryson, McCarl	Bryson and McCarl	2:22
11.	"Starting Over"			4:10
Total length:				40:06

Timings and credits taken from the original Capitol issue (ST-11329).

== Charts ==
Chart (1974)	Peak position
Australia (Kent Music Report)	72
United States (Billboard 200)	143

== Band members ==
- Eric Carmen — vocals, rhythm guitar, piano
- Wally Bryson — vocals, lead guitar
- Scott McCarl — vocals, bass
- Michael McBride — drums
