= Tonight (Raspberries song) =

Single by Raspberries

from the album Side 3
- B-side: "Hard to Get Over a Heartbreak"
- Released: August 1973
- Genre: Power pop
- Length: 3:25
- Label: Capitol
- Songwriter: Eric Carmen
- Producer: Jimmy Ienner

Raspberries singles chronology
"Let's Pretend" (1972)	"Tonight" (1973)	"I'm a Rocker" (1973)

"Tonight" is a song by Raspberries, released in August 1973. It was written by band leader Eric Carmen, who also provided the lead vocals. The song was the first of three single releases from their third LP, Side 3.

Carmen said that it was inspired by the Small Faces and that it is his favorite Raspberries song. He said that it was the song recorded in the studio where the band sounded like it did live. Guitarist Wally Bryson said that it has "one of those intros that nobody knows how to play but me" because he made up "weird chords to get different sounds."

== Reception ==
Cash Box called the song a "driving Eric Carmen composition that is destined to become the group's fourth successive chart item." Record World called it a "Top 40 powerhouse that is reminiscent of early Beatles." Billboard recommended the single. Arcadia Tribune critic Randall Davis called it a "typically great AM radio tune."

Rolling Stone critic Dave Marsh called it a "[ringer] for Paul McCartney." Allmusic critic Mark Deming said that "the king-sized guitar figure Wally Bryson uses to launch ['Tonight'] has a bark worthy of Jimmy Page, while drummer Jim Bonfanti lets loose with lots of manic drum fills worthy of his obvious role model, Keith Moon."

Music journalist Ken Sharp called it "the quintessential Raspberries song" and "the perfect power pop song", noting an influence from the Small Faces and praising "Carmen's deliciously gritty Steve Marriott-like vocal, Wally Bryson's ripping power chords, Dave Smalley's pulsating bass line and Jim Bonfanti's powerhouse drumming."

Ultimate Classic Rock critic Dave Swanson rated it as the Raspberries 4th best song, calling it "pop perfection in three and a half minutes of glory" and claiming it has "one of the best drum exclamation point endings ever." Swanson noted influences from the Small Faces, the Who and the Beatles. Classic Rock History critic Brian Kachejian rated it as the Raspberries 10th best song, particularly praising Bonfanti's drumming and the song's harmonies.

Country musician Bill Lloyd rated "Tonight" as the 5th greatest power pop song of all time, saying that "this was the recording where [the Raspberries] got the balance just perfect. It's gorgeous and testoseroni all at once."

== Chart performance ==
"Tonight" was the biggest hit from the album, reaching number 69 on the US Billboard Hot 100, and number 37 on Cash Box. It also reached number 80 in Canada.

=== Weekly charts ===
Chart (1973)	Peak position
Canada RPM Top Singles	80
US Billboard Hot 100	69
US Cash Box Top 100	37
US Record World	43

== Cover versions ==
"Tonight" was covered by Mötley Crüe in 1981. It was an outtake from their album, Too Fast for Love. The song was released in 1999, issued with the remastered 1999 and 2003 editions of the group's LP.

== Band members ==
- Eric Carmen – bass guitar, lead and backing vocals, piano
- Wally Bryson – lead guitar, backing and lead vocals
- Dave Smalley – rhythm guitar, backing and lead vocals
- Jim Bonfanti – drums, backing vocals
