= Pebbles, Volume 2 =

Compilation album
- Released: 1979; June 9, 1992 (CD)
- Recorded: 1960s
- Genres: Psychedelic rock; garage rock
- Length: 39:07 (LP); 50:49 (CD reissue)
- Label: BFD

chronology
Pebbles, Volume 1 (1978)	Pebbles, Volume 2 (1979)	Pebbles, Volume 3 (1979)

Pebbles, Volume 2 is a compilation album featuring American underground psychedelic and garage rock musical artists from the 1960s. It is the second installment of the Pebbles series and was released on BFD Records in 1979 (see 1979 in music).

Musical highlights includes the opening number, "Makin' Deals", by the Satans, which features the lyric, "Can you guess my name?", two years prior to the Rolling Stones on their song, "Sympathy for the Devil", and in a similar fashion to Mick Jagger's snarling vocals. Among the tracks on the album, the Choir's "It's Cold Outside", the Zakary Thaks' "Bad Girl", and the Lyrics' "So What!" are arguably the most known for their additional inclusions in the Nuggets: Original Artyfacts from the First Psychedelic Era, 1965–1968 box set, in 1998. The Electric Prunes' wah-wah pedal advertisement and the Sons of Adam's rendition of Arthur Lee's song, "Feathered Fish" received their first commercially accessible release with the album.

In 1992, AIP Records re-released Pebbles, Volume 2 on compact disc. The reissue includes tracks by the Avengers, Satan and the D-Men, Undesyded, the Mark VI, the Quid, which was the only non-American group on the album, and an additional song by the Choir.

== Track listing ==
=== Side one ===
1. The Satans: "Makin' Deals" - 2:08
2. The Moving Sidewalks: "99th Floor" - 2:13
3. The Sons of Adam: "Feathered Fish" - 2:28
4. The Electric Prunes: Vox wah-wah pedal advertisement - 1:03
5. The Road: "You Rub Me the Wrong Way" - 2:22
6. The Lyrics: "So What!" - 2:42
7. The Buddahs: "Lost Innocence" - 2:10
8. The Zakary Thaks: "Bad Girl" - 2:04
9. The Green Fuz: "Green Fuz" - 2:06

=== Side two ===
1. The Squires: "Go Ahead" - 2:15, vinyl-only track
2. The Little Boy Blues: "I Can Only Give You Everything" - 2:27
3. The Dovers: "She's Gone" - 2:18
4. Phil and the Fanatics: "I Must Run" - 2:40
5. The Dovers: "What Am I Going to Do" - 2:28
6. The Choir: "It's Cold Outside" - 2:46
7. Bobby Fuller: "Wine Wine Wine" - 2:43
8. The Litter: "I'm a Man" - 3:48, vinyl-only track

=== 1992 CD bonus tracks ===
1. The Choir: "I'm Going Home" - 2:35
2. The Avengers: "Be a Cave Man" - 1:56
3. The Mark VI: "Don't Want Your Lovin'" - 2:49
4. Satan and the D-Men: "She'll Lie" - 3:08
5. Undesyded: "Freedom of Love" - 2:49
6. The Quid: "Crazy Things" - 3:00
