= Side 3 (Raspberries album) =

Studio album by Raspberries
- Released: September 10, 1973
- Recorded: April 1973
- Studio: Record Plant Studios, New York City
- Genre: Rock; power pop
- Length: 36:00
- Label: Capitol
- Producer: Jimmy Ienner

Raspberries chronology
Fresh (1972)	Side 3 (1973)	Starting Over (1974)

Professional ratings
Review scores
Source	Rating
AllMusic	link
Christgau's Record Guide	B

Side 3 is the third album from the Raspberries, released in 1973. The album cover is diecut like a basket of Raspberries, with the group's name placed at the top of the LP sleeve. Three singles were released from the album: "Tonight" / "Hard to Get Over a Heartbreak", which reached number 69 on the US Billboard Hot 100 and number 37 on the Cash Box chart; "I'm a Rocker", which reached number 94 on Billboard and number 75 on Cash Box; and "Ecstasy", which did not chart on Billboard but reached number 116 on Cash Box. The album itself reached number 138 on the US albums chart.

Record World called "I'm a Rocker" a "rollicking rocker that should put [the Raspberries] back in the top ten where they belong" and "another powerhouse Jimmy Ienner production." Cash Box said "Hard, steady rocker with top flight Eric Carmen vocals and driving music makes this one a dance natural." Billboard recommended the single. Lead vocalist Eric Carmen described it as "a kind of Little Richard, old-time 1950s rock and roll rave up." Classic Rock History critic Brian Kachejian said of it that "When Eric Carmen wanted to let loose, he had the pipes to stand with any great rock lead vocalists" and noted that the song "starts out heavy but finds its way leaning towards more of the pop side of the band when the verse meets the chorus." Anderson Daily Bulletin critic Randall L. Rohn said it has "an updated 50s sound" and that "Carmen's screaming falsetto sounds so much like Paul McCartney that comparison is inevitable." Music critic Robert Christgau said it was "atypically guitar-tough."

Ultimate Classic Rock critic Dave Swanson rated four songs from Side 3 among the Raspberries' 10 best: "Ecstasy", "Tonight", "On the Beach" and "Last Dance". Kachejian rated "I'm a Rocker" and "Tonight" as being among the Raspberries' Top 10.

This album was re-released on CD as part of Power Pop Vol. 2, also containing their fourth album, Starting Over.

"Tonight" was later recorded by glam metal band Mötley Crüe for their 1981 album Too Fast for Love, but the track was left off the initial release (it appeared on the 1999 reissue and later versions).

== Track listing ==
No.	Title	Writer / Lead vocalist	Length
1.	"Tonight"	Eric Carmen	3:39
2.	"Last Dance"	Wally Bryson	3:36
3.	"Making It Easy"	Smalley	3:10
4.	"On the Beach"	Carmen	4:20
5.	"Hard to Get Over a Heartbreak"	Smalley	3:51
6.	"I'm a Rocker"	Carmen	5:10
7.	"Should I Wait"	Smalley	3:51
8.	"Ecstasy"	Carmen	3:37
9.	"Money Down"	Bryson	4:01

== Personnel ==
- Eric Carmen – rhythm guitar, lead and backing vocals, piano
- Wally Bryson – lead guitar, backing and lead vocals
- Dave Smalley – bass, backing and lead vocals
- Jim Bonfanti – drums, backing vocals
