= Raspberries (album) =

Studio album by Raspberries
- Released: April 10, 1972
- Recorded: November 1971
- Studios: Record Plant, New York City; Abbey Road, London
- Genre: Power pop
- Length: 34:27
- Label: Capitol
- Producer: Jimmy Ienner

Raspberries chronology
| Raspberries (1972) | Fresh (1972) |

Professional ratings
Review scores
| Source | Rating |
|---|---|
| AllMusic | 4/5 stars |
| Christgau's Record Guide | C+ |
| Creem | C |

Raspberries is the debut album from the Raspberries, released in April 1972. It was their second highest-charting LP, reaching No. 51 on the Billboard album chart, but spent more weeks on the chart than all of their other albums combined.

The American and Australian versions of this LP carried a scratch and sniff sticker with a strong raspberry scent.

It contained two charting singles, "Don't Want to Say Goodbye", which reached No. 86, and their biggest hit, "Go All the Way", which reached No. 5.

The album was re-released onto CD as part of Power Pop Vol. 1, also containing their second album, Fresh.

== Track listing ==
| No. | Title | Writer(s) | Lead Vocals | Length |
|---|---|---|---|---|
| 1. | "Go All the Way" | Eric Carmen | Carmen | 3:19 |
| 2. | "Come Around and See Me" | Wally Bryson | Bryson | 3:00 |
| 3. | "I Saw the Light" | Carmen, Bryson | Carmen | 2:40 |
| 4. | "Rock & Roll Mama" | Dave Smalley | Smalley | 4:35 |
| 5. | "Waiting" | Carmen | Carmen | 2:43 |
| 6. | "Don't Want to Say Goodbye" | Carmen, Bryson | Carmen, Bryson | 5:00 |
| 7. | "With You in My Life" | Bryson | Bryson | 2:45 |
| 8. | "Get It Moving" | Smalley | Smalley | 2:25 |
| 9. | "I Can Remember" | Carmen | Carmen | 8:00 |

== Charts ==
| Chart (1972/73) | Peak position |
|---|---|
| Australia (Kent Music Report) | 30 |
| United States (Billboard 200) | 51 |

== Band members ==
- Eric Carmen – rhythm guitar, lead and backing vocals, piano
- Wally Bryson – lead guitar, backing and lead vocals
- Dave Smalley – bass guitar, backing and lead vocals
- Jim Bonfanti – drums, backing vocals
