= Overnight Sensation (Hit Record) =

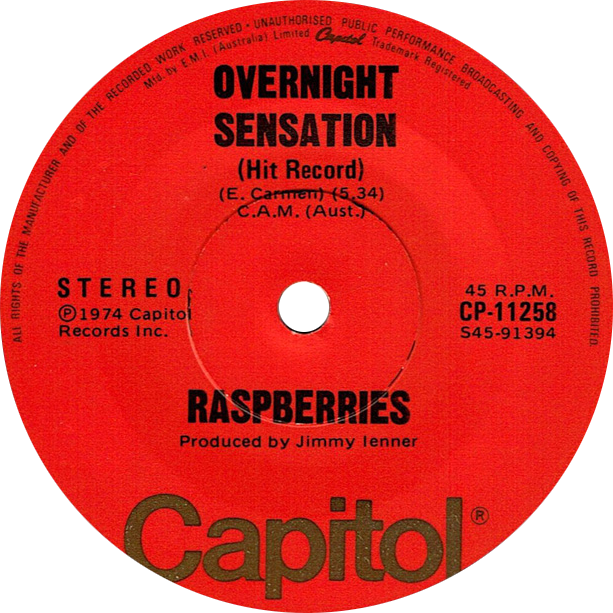
- Side A of the Australian single

Single by Raspberries

from the album Starting Over
- B-side: "Hands on You"
- Released: September 1974
- Recorded: Record Plant Studios, New York City
- Genre: Power pop
- Length: 5:36
- Label: Capitol Records 3946
- Songwriter: Eric Carmen
- Producer: Jimmy Ienner

Raspberries singles chronology
"Ecstasy" (1974)	"Overnight Sensation (Hit Record)" (1974)	"Cruisin' Music" (1975)

Music video
- "Overnight Sensation" on YouTube

"Overnight Sensation (Hit Record)" is a single by Raspberries, released in September 1974, on the Capitol label. It was written by band leader Eric Carmen, who also provided the lead vocals. The song was the first single release from their fourth and final studio album Starting Over.

The song reached the Top 40 on three principal US charts, number 18 on the Billboard Hot 100, number 24 on Cashbox, and number 26 on Record World. It was also a number 22 hit in Canada. It spent 12 weeks on Billboard, and was their final charting single release.

== Background ==
Carmen stated about the song:

"Overnight Sensation" was like the first video that I ever saw in my head. It was written very theatrically. The first scene was, you can picture Abbey Road Studios, this great, huge dark room with a real high camera and this one spotlight on the singer and it was like this guy singing in his living room, thinking about the music business. "I know it sounds funny but I'm not in it for the money..." So he gets through the first verse and the first group of background vocals come in and the room lights up and gets a little bit bigger, and by the time you get to the first full-blown chorus it's like, "Baboom!" Visually, I was trying to get on a record what I was seeing in my head.

Rolling Stone critic Dave Marsh said that "[...] in 1974, when Carmen despaired of ever breaking through to more substantial recognition he came up with a last ditch effort called 'Hit Record (Overnight Sensation)' that painted his aspirations with perfect bluntness. 'Overnight Sensation' is the radio that leads to Carmen's street of dreams, and in it, his vision of himself as the true inheritor of the innocence of early sixties rock is justified completely." AllMusic critic Mark Deming said that it "may be Carmen's most impressive creation, an epic-scale production number about the thrill of hearing your song on the radio (when Carmen sings 'I know it sounds funny/But I'm not in it for the money,' he sounds so heartfelt you almost believe the guy)".

== Reception ==
Cash Box called it a "simply incredible rocker (possibly the best ever laid down by the group)" and said that "Eric Carmen's lead vocals are perfect and dynamic as can be, but the real delight here is the series of changes this track goes through". Record World said that the song is in a Beach Boys mold and that the "dynamic production is in total command of goosebumps and a good time feeling."

Classic Rock History critic Brian Kachejian rated "Overnight Sensation (Hit Record)" as the Raspberries 2nd best song, saying that "this spectacular song was probably the band's most mature work and easily their best production" and that "there's sort of a Beach Boys 'Good Vibrations' vibe also happening here in terms of arrangement, production and harmonies". Music journalist Ken Sharp rated it the Raspberries' 6th best song, calling it a "jaw-dropping, mini Spectorian-Beach Boys symphony". Ultimate Classic Rock critic Dave Swanson rated it as the Raspberries 8th best song, saying that it is "probably the Raspberries' most adventurous record" and a "majestic slice of pop music". Swanson described it as "a mini-symphony packed into a five minute song" that is "overflowing with vocals, percussion, guitars, drums, saxophones, pianos, you name it".

Billboard rated "Overnight Sensation (Hit Record)" as one of the best cuts of Starting Over.

John Lennon, a Raspberries fan, particularly liked "Overnight Sensation" and was present for part of the recording of Starting Over. Although uncredited, he is said to have assisted with the production of the song.

== Later uses ==
"Overnight Sensation" was included on the Raspberries Pop Art Live CD set from their reunion concert recording, November 26, 2004, at the House of Blues in Cleveland, Ohio, released August 18, 2017.

== Cover versions ==
In 1980, Cherie & Marie Currie recorded "Overnight Sensation". It was included on their album, Messin' with the Boys.

The Kevin McDermott Orchestra recorded "Overnight Sensation" for their 1994 album, "The Last Supper".

American alternative rock band They Might Be Giants recorded "Overnight Sensation" for their 2026 album, The World Is to Dig.

== Chart performance ==
=== Weekly charts ===
Chart (1974)	Peak position
Canadian RPM Top Singles	22
US Billboard Hot 100	18
US Cash Box Top 100	24
US Record World	26

=== Year-end charts ===
Chart (1974)	Rank
Canada	193
US (Joel Whitburn's Pop Annual)	152

== Personnel ==
- Eric Carmen – lead and backing vocals, piano
- Wally Bryson – lead guitar, backing vocals
- Scott McCarl – bass guitar, backing vocals
- Michael McBride – drums, backing vocals
