= Mummypowder =

Alternative rock band from Helsinki, Finland

Mummypowder are a four-piece alternative rock band from Helsinki, Finland. Their frontman and the only remaining original member is the singer, guitar player and songwriter Janne Lehtinen.

== History ==
Mummypowder were formed in 1996 in Helsinki. They quickly signed a record contract with Straightedge Records in 1997 and subsequently played their tenth concert at New York's famous CBGB's-club, followed by a performance at the Austin, Texas rock festival South by Southwest.

Their debut album, The Heavyweight Champions, was released in 1999 to great critical acclaim, although sales were moderate. The second album, V. Strange (2003), was written and almost exclusively performed by Janne Lehtinen. Touted as one of the albums of the year by some of the press, the album went mostly unnoticed by the audience. Finally, in 2004, Mummypowder joined the ranks of Finnish MTV bands with the video of the first single release, "Don't Hold Your Breath", from their third album, Consternation! Uproar! (2004).

In May 2006, Consternation! Uproar! was released in Japan. Later that month, the band performed in Tokyo as part of a small tour alongside other Finnish musical acts such as Don Johnson Big Band.

Mummypowder's fourth album, Centuries Later, was released in May 2011 by Grandpop Records.

== Members ==
=== Current members ===
- Janne Lehtinen – vocals, guitar, songs and lyrics (1996–)
- Aleksi Mänttäri – bass (2001–)
- Staffan Turbanov – guitar (2003–)
- Roope Palomäki – drums (2005–)

=== Former members ===
- Tero Karhu – bass (1996–2001)
- Aleksi Pahkala – guitar (1998–2001)
- Janne Nissilä – drums (1996–2001)
- Heikki Tikka – drums (2001–2005)
- Ville Alajuuma – keyboards (2001–2002)

== Discography ==
=== Albums ===
- The Heavyweight Champions (April 28, 1999)
- V. Strange (May 16, 2003)
- Consternation! Uproar! (April 23, 2004)
- Consternation! Uproar! (Japan edition) (May 10, 2006)
- Centuries Later (May 11, 2011)

=== Singles ===
- I Think I'm Pregnant-EP (March 14, 1998)
- Blackout-day (June 11, 1999)
- Trying to Ride a Donkey (May 16, 2003)
- Don't Hold Your Breath (February 26, 2004)
- No-one There to Entertain You (September 20, 2004)

=== Videos ===
- Blackout-day (1999)
- Trying to Ride a Donkey (2003)
- Don't Hold Your Breath (2004)
