= Fresh (Raspberries album) =

Studio album by Raspberries
- Released: November 13, 1972
- Recorded: September 1972
- Studios: Abbey Road Studios, London, Record Plant Studios, New York
- Genre: Power pop
- Length: 31:45
- Label: Capitol
- Producer: Jimmy Ienner

Raspberries chronology
Raspberries (1972)	Fresh (1972)	Side 3 (1973)

Professional ratings
Review scores
Source	Rating
AllMusic	4.5/5 stars
Christgau's Record Guide	B−
Creem	C

Fresh is the second studio album by Raspberries, released in 1972. It contains the two top 40 singles "I Wanna Be with You" which reached number 16 on the Billboard Hot 100, number 10 on Cash Box and number 7 on Record World, and "Let's Pretend" which reached number 35 on Billboard, number 18 on Cashbox, and number 14 on Record World. It was their highest-charting album, peaking at number 36 on the Billboard 200 album chart.

Creem critic Mike Saunders said of it that "This is the best album I've heard in a long time, and it looks like we have an important group on our hands." Music critic Greg Shaw said that the album is "every bit as enjoyable as the classic Beatles albums."

Record World called the single "Drivin' Around" a "Beach Boys-styled hot rod rocker." Music critic Robert Christgau called it a "remarkable Beach Boys takeoff that has tape decks in it."

This album was re-released on CD as part of Power Pop Vol. 1, also containing their first album, Raspberries.

== Track listing ==
Timings and credits taken from the original Capitol issue (ST-11123).

No.	Title	Lead Vocals	Length
1.	"I Wanna Be with You" (Carmen)	Eric Carmen	3:05
2.	"Goin' Nowhere Tonight" (Carmen, Smalley)	Dave Smalley	2:30
3.	"Let's Pretend" (Carmen)	Carmen	3:42
4.	"Every Way I Can" (Smalley)	Smalley	2:44
5.	"I Reach for the Light" (Carmen)	Carmen	4:01
6.	"Nobody Knows" (Carmen, Smalley)	Carmen	2:19
7.	"It Seemed So Easy" (Carmen, Smalley)	Smalley	3:53
8.	"Might as Well" (Bryson)	Wally Bryson	2:25
9.	"If You Change Your Mind" (Carmen)	Carmen	3:59
10.	"Drivin' Around" (Carmen, Smalley)	Carmen	3:03

== Charts ==
Chart (1972/73)	Peak position
Australia (Kent Music Report)	31
United States (Billboard 200)	36

== Band members ==
- Eric Carmen - rhythm guitar, lead and backing vocals, piano
- Wally Bryson - lead guitar, backing and lead vocals
- Dave Smalley - bass, backing and lead vocals
- Jim Bonfanti - drums, backing vocals

== Production ==
- George Marino - mastering engineer

== Bibliography ==
- Borack, John M. (2007). Shake Some Action: The Ultimate Power Pop Guide. Not Lame Recordings. ISBN 978-0-9797714-0-8.
