= Raspberries (band) =

American pop rock band

- Raspberries, 1975. L-R: Wally Bryson, Michael McBride, Scott McCarl, and Eric Carmen.

Background information
- Origin: Cleveland, Ohio, U.S.
- Genres: Power pop; pop rock
- Years active: 1970–1975; 1999–2000; 2004–2009
- Labels: Capitol; Omnivore; Rykodisc
- Past members: Wally Bryson; Eric Carmen; Jim Bonfanti; John Aleksic; Dave Smalley; Scott McCarl; Michael McBride
- Website: www.raspberriesband.com

The Raspberries were an American pop rock band formed in Cleveland, Ohio, in 1970. They had a run of success in the early 1970s music scene with their pop rock sound, which AllMusic later described as featuring "exquisitely crafted melodies and achingly gorgeous harmonies." The members were known for their clean-cut public image and matching suits, which brought them teenybopper attention as well as scorn from some mainstream media outlets as "uncool". The group drew influence from the British Invasion era—especially the Beatles, the Who, the Hollies, and the Small Faces—and its mod sensibility. In both the US and the UK, the Raspberries helped pioneer the power pop music style that took off after the group disbanded. They also have had a following among professional musicians such as Jack Bruce, Ringo Starr, and Courtney Love.

The group's "classic" lineup consisted of Eric Carmen (vocals, guitars, bass, piano), Wally Bryson (guitars), Dave Smalley (guitars, bass) and Jim Bonfanti (drums). Their best known songs include "Go All the Way", "Let's Pretend", "I Wanna Be with You", "Tonight", and "Overnight Sensation (Hit Record)". Producer Jimmy Ienner was responsible for all four of the Raspberries' albums in the 1970s. The group disbanded in 1975 after a five-year run, and Eric Carmen proceeded to a successful career as a solo artist. Bryson and Smalley resurrected the group's name in 1999 for an album, which included singer/songwriter Scott McCarl as vocalist. In 2004, the original quartet reunited and undertook a well-received reunion tour in 2005.

== History ==
=== Formation ===
The group had its roots in two of Cleveland's most successful local bands in the late 1960s, the Choir and Cyrus Erie. The Choir, originally called the Mods and consisting of Dann Klawon, Wally Bryson, Dave Burke, Dave Smalley, and Jim Bonfanti, had a more extensive repertoire of original songs. Most notable was "It's Cold Outside" which parlayed its massive local success (No. 1 in Cleveland) into a nationally charting single (peaking at No. 68 for Roulette Records). The Choir then went through a series of lineup changes, with Smalley and Bonfanti remaining in the various versions, until 1968, when Dave Smalley was drafted and sent to Vietnam. As a result, the Choir disbanded, although it later reformed behind Bonfanti and ultimately survived until 1970.

Although The Choir had the hit and a string of singles, Cyrus Erie, founded by brothers Michael and Bob McBride, became the better-drawing local act shortly after Eric Carmen joined in 1967. Carmen persuaded Bryson, who had recently left the Choir, to join. In live shows, Cyrus Erie mainly covered other artists' songs. When the group signed to Epic Records they recorded two Carmen/Bryson originals ("Get the Message" b/w "Sparrow") as a single. Following this, Bryson left, and was replaced by Randy Klawon. Eric, Mike, Randy and Dann Klawon then formed a new act, and the name was changed to the Quick. The Quick recorded a single of two Carmen/Klawon originals for Epic which did not find much success.

The group's style arose from a variety of rock and roll groups that the members loved, especially the Who. Carmen later said:

Pete Townshend coined the phrase [power pop] to define what the Who did. For some reason, it didn't stick to the Who, but it did stick to these groups that came out in the '70s that played kind of melodic songs with crunchy guitars and some wild drumming. It just kind of stuck to us like glue, and that was OK with us because the Who were among our highest role models. We absolutely loved the Who.

=== 1970–1972 ===
After discussions between Carmen and Bonfanti about forming a new group, the first lineup for the Raspberries was Eric Carmen (rhythm guitar, vocals, piano, bass), Jim Bonfanti (drums, backing vocals), Wally Bryson (lead guitar, vocals) and John Aleksic (born 1951, bass, guitar, vocals). Aleksic left the group at the end of 1970 and the group performed as a trio until April 1971, when former Choir member Dave Smalley (rhythm guitar, vocals), just back from Vietnam, became the fourth member of the original recording lineup with Carmen moving to bass. The Raspberries' demo tape went to the desk of producer Jimmy Ienner, for whom Carmen had previously done session work. After a major-label bidding war the band signed to Capitol Records. This first album featured a strong scratch and sniff raspberry scented sticker on the front cover.

The Raspberries wore matching ensembles on stage, and the group was criticized for making its stage entrance in tuxedos and large bouffant hairdos which, according to Carmen, "complemented the style of our music".

=== 1972–1974 ===
"Go All the Way" peaked at #5 in the U.S. in October 1972, sold over one million copies, and was awarded a gold disc. Afterwards, Carmen and Smalley switched instruments, with Carmen moving to rhythm guitar so that he would be upfront on stage, while Smalley took over bass. After two albums, Raspberries and Fresh, both released in 1972, creative tension came to a head sparked largely by Carmen's creative dominance (and commercial success) over the contributions of Bryson and Smalley. Accordingly, Side 3 turned out to be a more raw, aggressive effort than its predecessors, typified by the opening track "Tonight". After the band's tour for Side 3, Smalley was ejected from the band due to musical differences and Bonfanti departed soon afterwards. They subsequently formed their own band, Dynamite. They were replaced in December 1973 by bassist Scott McCarl and ex-Cyrus Erie drummer Michael McBride for what was to be the fourth and final Raspberries album, Starting Over.

Bryson's friend Jeff Hutton (who had also played with McBride in Target) was brought in to contribute keyboards on stage for the group's late 1973–74 tours, replacing Opie O'Brien (keyboards, sax) and Tony Shannon (keyboards, synths) who had done the honors on their 1973 tour for Side 3.

=== Post-breakup ===
In April 1975, Rainbow Canyon guitarist Billy Hanna came in to sub for an ill Bryson, but the band broke up on April 19, 1975, after a final gig in Scranton, Pennsylvania, at the Masonic Temple.

However, their style continued to influence other musicians. Bruce Springsteen praised the Raspberries at several stops during his Summer 2005 tour. Springsteen's drummer Max Weinberg said that he based his drum style in that period off of Raspberries drummer Michael McBride (particularly on the Springsteen album Darkness on the Edge of Town). Paul Stanley of Kiss, Tom Petty, and Axl Rose of Guns N' Roses, have all also cited the Raspberries as an influence in their songwriting.

In 1978, Bryson joined another notable power pop band, Fotomaker, led by ex-Rascals Dino Danelli and Gene Cornish. He left shortly after the second of the band's three albums was released.

A biography of the Raspberries titled Overnight Sensation – The Story of the Raspberries by Ken Sharp was released in 1993.

In 1996, a tribute album to Raspberries called Raspberries Preserved was released by Pravda Records, a Chicago-based indie record label. The album featured 21 cover versions by such acts as the Rubinoos, Bill Lloyd, Brad Jones, Tiny Lights, Rank Strangers, the Gladhands, and the Shambles.

Singer-guitarist and primary songwriter Eric Carmen went on to have a successful solo career as a singer and writer of romantic pop ballads. His first solo hit "All by Myself" (which rearranged a motif from the melody of "Let's Pretend" and comes directly from Sergei Rachmaninoff's Piano Concerto No. 2 in C minor, Opus 18) hit No. 2 nationally, and was covered by Celine Dion to much fanfare in 1996. His second single "Never Gonna Fall in Love Again" was also a hit, as was "She Did It", a spiritual sequel to both, which revived the Raspberries' power pop sound. The chorus of "Never Gonna Fall in Love Again" came from Rachmaninoff's Symphony No. 2 Op. 27. Carmen later had additional Top Ten singles success with "Hungry Eyes" (from Dirty Dancing, 1987) and "Make Me Lose Control". He also wrote "Almost Paradise" (performed by Mike Reno and Ann Wilson for Footloose, 1984), as well as songs that were made major hits by Shaun Cassidy ("That's Rock & Roll" and "Hey Deanie").

On March 24, 1999, all four original members, Carmen, Bryson, Smalley and Bonfanti, reunited in Metrosync Studio, near Cleveland, to play for the first time since 1973. A summer reunion tour was discussed, but the reformed group found minimal interest among promoters since the band had not been heard of since the mid-70s. Carmen and Bonfanti dropped out but Bryson, Smalley and their Starting Over bassist, Scott McCarl, decided to continue on briefly. The trio released a six-song EP entitled Raspberries Refreshed in September 2000. The album's tracks, written by the three remaining members, re-created the group's original sound.

In November 2004, the House of Blues nightclub chain opened its Cleveland branch with a Raspberries reunion concert featuring all four original members, accompanied on stage by four members of Carmen's band: Paul Sidoti – bass, guitar, keyboards, backing vocals; Billy Sullivan – guitar, keyboards, harmonica, backing vocals; Jennifer Lee – keyboards, vocals; and Derek Braunschweiger – percussion. This led to a well-received 2005 mini-tour starting at the Chicago House of Blues, a VH1 Classic special, and a concert broadcast on XM Satellite Radio. A date from the 2005 tour in Los Angeles was recorded and released in 2007 as Live on Sunset Strip. The double CD and one DVD contained a foreword from Bruce Springsteen, and a 1970s photo of John Lennon wearing a Raspberries' Starting Over sweatshirt. Capitalizing on the release, Raspberries played further shows in New York, California, and their hometown of Cleveland.

The band booked a few more reunion dates into late 2007, culminating with a concert at Cleveland's Playhouse Square on December 14, 2007, and an appearance at a VIP event at the Rock and Roll Hall of Fame in Cleveland on April 3, 2009 turned out to be their very last show.

The band's iconic rock tune "Go All the Way" attracted renewed attention in 2014 when it was notably included in the Marvel Cinematic Universe film Guardians of the Galaxy. The Albany Democrat-Herald ran a positive review of the film remarking that "while it's freaky to hear the Raspberries' ... in space, one recognizes the malleability of its majesty and craft and appreciate the range of vocalist Eric Carmen". The song was included on the film's Guardians of the Galaxy: Awesome Mix Vol. 1 soundtrack released on July 29, 2014.

In 2017, Omnivore Records released Pop Art Live, a recording of the band's first Cleveland reunion show on November 26, 2004. It was their first show together in nearly 30 years. Featuring twenty-eight songs, including material by major influences the Beatles and the Who, the album received positive reviews from publications such as AllMusic, Paste, and Stereophile. Critic Mark Deming of AllMusic remarked that "the Raspberries merge the superb craftsmanship of their classic recordings with the sweat and muscle of a crack band having a great time."

Carmen died on March 10, 2024.

== Band members ==
- Eric Carmen – lead and backing vocals, piano (1970–April 1975, 2004–2009); rhythm guitar (1970–1971, end of 1972–April 1975, 2004–2009); bass (1970–late 1972; died 2024)
- Wally Bryson – lead guitar, backing and lead vocals (1970–April 1975, 1999–2000, 2004–2009)
- John Aleksic – bass, guitar, backing vocals (1970–late 1970)
- Jim Bonfanti – drums, backing vocals (1970–late 1973, 2004–2009)
- Dave Smalley – rhythm guitar (1971–late 1972, 1999–2000); bass (late 1972–late 1973, 2004–2009); backing and lead vocals (early 1971–November 1973, 1999–2000, 2004–2009)
- Scott McCarl – bass, backing and lead vocals (December 1973–April 1975, 1999–2000)
- Michael McBride – drums (December 1973–April 1975; died 2020)

=== Touring ===
- Opie O'Brien – keyboards, synthesizers, sax (1973 Side 3 Tour)
- Tony Shannon – keyboards, synthesizers (1973 Side 3 Tour)
- Jeff Hutton – keyboards, synthesizers (late 1973–August 1974 tour dates)
- Billy Hanna – guitar (fill-in for Bryson on 1975 final tour dates)
- Paul Sidoti – bass, guitar, keyboards, backing vocals (2004–2007 Tours)
- Billy Sullivan – guitar, keyboards, backing vocals (2004–2007 Tours)
- Jennifer Lee – keyboards, vocals (2004–2007 Tours)
- Derek Braunschweiger - percussion, drum tech (2004–2007 Tours)

== Discography ==
=== Studio albums ===
Title	Album details	Peak chart positions		
Title	Album details	US	AUS	CAN
Raspberries	Released: April 10, 1972; Label: Capitol	51	30	22
Fresh	Released: November 13, 1972; Label: Capitol	36	31	19
Side 3	Released: September 10, 1973; Label: Capitol	128	—	—
Starting Over	Released: September 16, 1974; Label: Capitol	143	72	—
"—" denotes a recording that did not chart or was not released in that territory.

=== Select compilation albums ===
Title	Album details	Peak chart positions	
Title	Album details	US	CAN
Raspberries' Best	Released: 1976; Label: Capitol	138	70
Capitol Collectors Series	Released: February 26, 1991; Label: Capitol	—	—
Greatest	Released: May 23, 2005; Label: Capitol	—	—
"—" denotes a recording that did not chart or was not released in that territory.

=== Live albums ===
- Live on Sunset Strip (2007)
- Pop Art Live (2017) (Note: Pop Art Live peaked at number 45 on the Billboard Independent Albums chart.)

=== Extended plays ===
- Refreshed (2000)

=== Singles ===
Title	Year	Peak chart positions			Certifications	Album
Title	Year	US	AUS	CAN	Certifications	Album
"Don't Want to Say Goodbye" b/w "Rock & Roll Mama"	1972	86	—	—		Raspberries
"Go All the Way" b/w "With You in My Life"	1972	5	14	5	RIAA: Gold	Raspberries
"I Wanna Be with You" b/w "Goin' Nowhere Tonight"	1972	16	44	17		Fresh
"Drivin' Around" b/w "Might As Well"	1972	—	—	—		Fresh
"Let's Pretend" b/w "Every Way I Can"	1973	35	62	13		Fresh
"Tonight" b/w "Hard to Get Over a Heartbreak"	1973	69	—	80		Side 3
"I'm a Rocker" b/w "Money Down"	1973	94	—	—		Side 3
"Ecstasy" b/w "Don't Want to Say Goodbye"	1973	(Note: Ecstasy peaked at number 116 on the Cashbox chart.)	—	—		Side 3
"Overnight Sensation (Hit Record)" b/w "Hands on You"	1974	18	91	22		Starting Over
"Cruisin' Music" b/w "Party's Over"	1975	—	—	—		Starting Over
"—" denotes a recording that did not chart or was not released in that territory.
