= Go All the Way (song) =

Single by Raspberries

from the album Raspberries
- B-side: "With You in My Life"
- Released: July 1972
- Recorded: 1972
- Studio: Record Plant, New York
- Genre: Power pop; soft rock; hard rock
- Length: 3:19
- Label: Capitol
- Songwriter: Eric Carmen
- Producer: Jimmy Ienner

Raspberries singles chronology
"Don't Want to Say Goodbye" (1972)	"Go All the Way" (1972)	"I Wanna Be With You" (1972)

"Go All the Way" is a song written by Eric Carmen of American rock group the Raspberries, from their 1972 album Raspberries. Released as a single in July 1972, the song reached the Top 5 on three principal US charts: number 5 on the Billboard Hot 100, number 4 on Cashbox, and number 3 on Record World. The single sold more than 1.3 million copies, earning the band their only certified Gold Record. It was their second single release and their biggest US hit.

Because of its sexually suggestive lyrics, "Go All the Way" was banned by the BBC, limiting its success in the United Kingdom.

== Background ==
Carmen has stated that the inspiration for the song was the Rolling Stones' "Let's Spend the Night Together." He said that "I wanted to write an explicitly sexual lyric that the kids would instantly get but the powers that be couldn't pin me down for." He also said that to try to avoid being censored he "turned it around so that the girl is encouraging the guy to go all the way, rather than the stereotypical thing of the guy trying to make the girl have sex with him. I figured that made me seem a little more innocent." Carmen got the title from Dan Wakefield's novel Going All the Way; when he saw the book, "[he] realized it would make a sensational song title."

Carmen wrote much of the song alone at the piano, but lead guitarist Wally Bryson believed that he should have received a songwriting credit for coming up with its famous intro guitar riff.

Engineer Shelly Yakus employed heavy dynamic range compression from a prototype limiter on the song in order to increase the power of the music.

Allmusic critic Mark Deming called it "among the finest records ever made about one of the key subjects in rock & roll — convincing your girlfriend to have sex with you," saying that it "merges smooth harmony parts and an easygoing melody with hook-laden breaks and a guitar figure that Pete Townshend would have been happy to have dreamed up." Rolling Stone critic Dave Marsh called it a "[ringer] for Paul McCartney."

Music journalist Ken Sharp noted that the song's "subversive lyrics were cleverly masked in a G-rated package" and that the lyrics are unusual in that "the girl in the song's chorus is pleading with her boyfriend to do her." Carmen said that his approach was "let's start it out like The Who, but when we get to the questionable part we will do it like choir boys and maybe they won't notice.

Ultimate Classic Rock critic Dave Swanson described how the song reflects various influences and merges them into a new type of song: "The opening Who-like blast leads into a very Beatles-esque verse, before landing in some forgotten Beach Boys chorus."

== Reception ==
Cash Box said that "mighty guitar riffs explode on impact" and the song has "a touch of the Badfinger sound." Record World said that "its effective combination of hard rock and top 40 stylings make this a natural for playlists of virtually every [radio] format." Wichita Beacon critic Paul Baker compared the song's guitar riff to that of Free's "All Right Now."

Swanson rated it as the Raspberries' greatest song and "the definitive power pop song of all time." Classic Rock History critic Brian Kachejian concurred, praising the melody and arrangement and calling it "an iconic pop gem." Kachejian also noted that "The way the verse transcends into the song's chorus riding on the wings of Eric Carmen's legendary lead vocal is one for the ages."

Sharp rated it the Raspberries' third best song, calling it a "'Power Pop How To' manual all wrapped up in three explosive minutes and unquestionably one of the most seminal pop singles ever."

Steve Sullivan wrote in the Encyclopedia of Great Popular Song Recordings that the opening guitar riff is one of the best in rock, saying that it "still has the capacity to startle and thrill more than four decades later."

The tune ranked at number 33 on the Billboard Year-End Top 100 of 1972 and number 39 on Cashbox's year-end best-sellers countdown. In 1989, Spin magazine named "Go All the Way" in its list of the "100 Greatest Singles of All Time", ranking it at number 91. "Go All the Way" appeared in Blender magazine's July 2006 issue as one of its "Greatest Songs Ever".

== Live performances ==
The song was performed on Don Kirshner's Rock Concert, Live in 1974. It was also performed on The Mike Douglas Show, and featured in the set at their 50th anniversary concert in 2007.

== Use in media and cover versions ==
"Go All the Way" has been featured in three movies. Director Cameron Crowe, a Raspberries fan, used it in his 2000 film Almost Famous. The Killers covered the song for the end credits of the 2012 film Dark Shadows, an adaptation of the 1966–1971 TV series of the same name. The song briefly appears in the 2014 Marvel Studios film Guardians of the Galaxy, and is one of the songs on its soundtrack.

In interviews, hard rock/metal personality Eddie Trunk, states that this song sparked his interest in music due mainly to the distorted guitar riffs.

Matthew Sweet and Bangles member Susanna Hoffs included a rendition of the song on their 2009 covers album Under the Covers, Vol. 2.

"Go All the Way" was included on the Raspberries Pop Art Live CD set from their reunion concert recording, November 26, 2004, at the House of Blues in Cleveland, Ohio, released August 18, 2017.

== Chart performance ==
=== Weekly charts ===
Chart (1972)	Peak position
Australia	14
Canadian RPM Top Singles	5
US Billboard Hot 100	5
US Cash Box Top 100	4
US Record World	3

=== Year-end charts ===
Chart (1972)	Rank
Australia	97
Canada	80
US Billboard Hot 100	33

== Personnel ==
- Eric Carmen – rhythm guitar, lead and backing vocals, piano
- Wally Bryson – lead guitar, backing and lead vocals
- Dave Smalley – bass guitar, backing and lead vocals
- Jim Bonfanti – drums, backing vocals
- John Hart – drums, backing vocals
