= Jim Bonfanti =

American drummer (born 1948)

James Alexander Bonfanti (born December 17, 1948, in Windber, Pennsylvania) is an American rock drummer who is best known for having been a member of the band Raspberries.

== Career ==
Bonfanti's music career began in 1965 when he saw The Beatles on The Ed Sullivan Show, which eventually led him to join a band called The Mods, later renamed The Choir. Their recording of "It’s Cold Outside" reached the national charts in 1967. In 1970, Bonfanti, Wally Bryson, Dave Smalley and Eric Carmen formed Raspberries. Together they produced four albums, eight singles, and a U.S. top ten and gold record for their major hit "Go All the Way".

Following two albums both released in 1972, creative tension came to a head sparked largely by Carmen's creative dominance over the contributions of fellow members. After the release of the Raspberries' third album, Side 3, Smalley and Bonfanti left the Raspberries to form their own band, Dynamite.

As of 2015, Bonfanti resides in Mentor, Ohio.
