= Jimmy Ienner =

American music producer

Jimmy Ienner (/ˈaɪnər/ EYE-nər; born c. 1945) is an American music producer, best known for producing albums for such artists as Bay City Rollers, The Raspberries and Three Dog Night.

== Biography ==
He went to Stamford (Connecticut) High School and graduated in 1963. He grew up in the Cove section of Stamford and while still in high school, Ienner formed and sang with the Barons. They charted with a tune titled "Pledge of a Fool" on the Epic label.

Ienner and his brother Don Ienner founded the publishing house C.A.M. U.S.A., which operated from 1972 to 1977. C.A.M. U.S.A. was a publishing, management and production company which represented such artists as American Asphalt, Three Dog Night, Grand Funk Railroad, Blood, Sweat & Tears, Air Supply, Raspberries, and Eric Carmen. Records that Ienner was involved with usually bear his distinctive logo next to his name—a widely smiling pair of lips.

Jimmy Ienner is a producer, advisor, publisher and consultant. His early work included the New York City psychedelic rock band January Tyme. Credited as album coordinator of their first and only album 'First Time from Memphis', recorded in 1969, released in 1970, now a cult collector's item, still circulating and being re-released. He was the key music producer for the 1987 film Dirty Dancing and co-executive produced the soundtrack with Bob Feiden. The film was shot to oldies songs from the personal collection of Eleanor Bergstein, the film's writer and producer. Ienner obtained licenses for the songs in her collection, chose other artists, and also enlisted star Patrick Swayze to sing "She's Like the Wind". Swayze had written the song a few years earlier with Stacy Widelitz, originally intending for it to be used in the 1984 film Grandview, U.S.A. with Jamie Lee Curtis and C. Thomas Howell. Ienner was also executive producer for the Dirty Dancing soundtrack album with the film's music. The film's popularity caught the producers by surprise, and the album had one million copies on back order before a single had even been released. The album spent 18 weeks at number 1 on the Billboard 200 album sales charts and went platinum eleven times, selling more than 39 million copies worldwide. It spawned a follow-up album in February 1988, entitled More Dirty Dancing, which also went multi-platinum, selling 32 million copies worldwide. Ienner also worked on music for Kiss and Pink Floyd.

He has been awarded 85 gold and platinum albums, multiple Grammys and two Oscars, including one for the Dirty Dancing soundtrack, which remains one of the top selling albums of all time. He also worked on the soundtrack albums for The Big Chill, White Men Can't Jump, and Sister Act.

Ienner was inducted into the Stamford High School Wall of Fame in 1998. He has a son, Jimmy Ienner Jr. and two daughters; Lisa and Tara.
