= The Go-Go's discography =

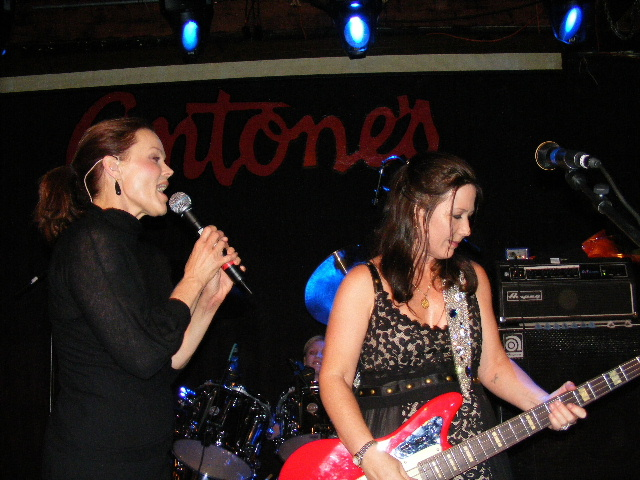
- Studio albums: 4
- Compilation albums: 3
- Singles: 16
- Video albums: 5
- Music videos: 11

This is the discography of the American new wave group The Go-Go's. They have released 4 studio albums, 3 compilation albums, and 16 singles.

== Albums ==
=== Studio albums ===
Title	Album details	Peak chart positions						Certifications
Title	Album details	US	AUS	CAN	NL	SWE	UK	Certifications
Beauty and the Beat	Released: July 8, 1981; Label: I.R.S.; Formats: LP, MC, 8-track	1	27	2	—	20	—	US: 2× Platinum; CAN: Platinum
Vacation	Released: July 20, 1982; Label: I.R.S.; Formats: LP, MC, 8-track	8	71	24	44	18	75	US: Gold
Talk Show	Released: March 19, 1984; Label: I.R.S.; Formats: CD, LP, MC, 8-track	18	—	64	—	—	—	
God Bless the Go-Go's	Released: May 15, 2001; Label: Beyond; Formats: CD, HDCD, MC	57	—	—	—	—	—	
"—" denotes releases that did not chart or were not released in that territory.

=== Compilation albums ===
Title	Album details	Peak chart positions	
Title	Album details	US	UK
Greatest	Released: October 5, 1990; Label: I.R.S.; Formats: CD, LP, MC	127	—
Return to the Valley of the Go-Go's	Released: October 18, 1994; Label: I.R.S.; Formats: CD, 2xCD, MC	—	52
VH1 Behind the Music: Go-Go's Collection	Released: May 23, 2000; Label: A&M; Formats: CD	—	—
"—" denotes releases that did not chart or were not released in that territory.

== Singles ==
Title	Year	Peak chart positions										Certifications	Album
Title	Year	US	US Main	US Dance	US AAA	AUS	CAN	NL	NZ	SWE	UK	Certifications	Album
"We Got the Beat"/"How Much More" (Note: "We Got the Beat" was originally recorded for Stiff Records as released as a single in the UK and Portugal. It was re-recorded for I.R.S. Records in 1981 and this version was subsequently released as a single becoming a hit.)	1980	—	—	35	—	—	—	—	—	—	—		Non-album single
"Our Lips Are Sealed"	1981	20	15	10	—	2	3	—	23	14	47	AUS: Gold	Beauty and the Beat
"We Got the Beat" (re-recording)	1981	2	7	—	—	29	3	—	—	—	—	US: Gold; CAN: Gold	Beauty and the Beat
"Automatic" (Note: Only released as a single in the UK.)	1982	—	—	—	—	—	—	—	—	—	—		Beauty and the Beat
"Vacation"	1982	8	13	17	—	43	23	32	—	18	—		Vacation
"Get Up and Go"/"Speeding" (Note: The B-side for "Get Up and Go" is "Speeding", from the soundtrack of Fast Times at Ridgemont High.)	1982	50	46	—	—	—	—	—	—	—	—		Vacation
"Girl of 100 Lists"	1982	—	—	—	—	—	—	—	—	—	—		Vacation
"This Old Feeling"	1982	—	—	—	—	—	—	—	—	—	—		Vacation
"Head over Heels"	1984	11	33	49	—	60	35	—	—	—	—		Talk Show
"Turn to You"	1984	32	—	—	—	—	95	—	—	—	—		Talk Show
"Yes or No"	1984	84	—	—	—	—	—	—	—	—	—		Talk Show
"Cool Jerk"	1991	—	—	—	—	—	—	—	—	—	60		Greatest
"The Whole World Lost Its Head"	1994	— (Note: "The Whole World Lost Its Head" did not chart on the Billboard Hot 100, but peaked at number eight on the Bubbling Under Hot 100 chart.)	— (Note: "The Whole World Lost Its Head" did not chart on the Billboard Mainstream Rock Tracks chart, but peaked at number 21 on the Billboard Modern Rock Tracks chart.)	—	—	—	—	—	—	—	29		Return to the Valley of the Go-Go's
"Good Girl"	1994	—	—	—	—	—	—	—	—	—	—		Return to the Valley of the Go-Go's
"Unforgiven"	2001	—	— (Note: "Unforgiven" did not chart on the Billboard Mainstream Rock Tracks chart, but peaked at number 22 on the Billboard Adult Top 40.)	—	—	—	—	—	—	—	—		God Bless the Go-Go's
"Club Zero"	2020	—	— (Note: "Club Zero" did not chart on the Billboard Mainstream Rock Tracks chart, but peaked at number 7 on the Rock Digital Song Sales chart.)	—	38	—	—	—	—	—	—		Non-album single
"—" denotes releases that did not chart or were not released in that territory.

== Videos ==
=== Video albums ===
Title	Album details
Totally Go-Go's	Released: September 1982; Label: Thorn EMI Video; Formats: VHS, Beta; Recorded live on December 4, 1981, Palos Verdes High School, Los Angeles, CA
Prime Time	Released: February 1985; Label: RCA/Columbia Pictures Home Video/I.R.S. Video; Formats: VHS, LD, Compilation of seven previously released music videos
Wild at the Greek	Released: August 1985; Label: RCA/Columbia Pictures Home Video/I.R.S. Video/VAP Japan; Formats: VHS, LD, DVD; Recorded live on August 8, 1984, Greek Theatre, Los Angeles, CA
Live at Central Park	Released: December 11, 2001; Label: Image Entertainment; Formats: DVD, VHS; Live footage from Rumsey Playfield, Central Park in June 2001, including behind-the-scenes footage
The Go-Go's	Released: January 24, 2020; Label: Showtime; Formats: DVD, Blu-ray, streaming; Documentary film about the band

=== Music videos ===
Title	Year	Director
"Our Lips Are Sealed"	1981	Derek Burbidge
"We Got the Beat"	1981	Mick Haggerty, C.D. Taylor
"Vacation"	1982	Mick Haggerty, C.D. Taylor
"Get Up and Go"	1982	Douglas Martin
"Head over Heels"	1984	Douglas Martin
"Turn to You"	1984	Mary Lambert
"Yes or No"	1984	Mary Lambert
"Cool Jerk"	1991	Martin Coppen, Sid Bartholomen
"The Whole World Lost Its Head"	1994	Roger Avary
"Unforgiven"	2001	Troy Smith
"Club Zero"	2020	
