= VH1 Behind the Music: Go-Go's Collection =

Compilation album by the Go-Go's
- Released: 2000
- Label: Interscope

The Go-Go's chronology
Return to the Valley of the Go-Go's (1994)	VH1 Behind the Music: Go-Go's Collection (2000)	God Bless the Go-Go's (2001)

Professional ratings
Review scores
Source	Rating
AllMusic	4/5 stars
The Rolling Stone Album Guide	4/5 stars

VH1 Behind the Music: Go-Go's Collection is the third compilation album by American rock band the Go-Go's, released in 2000 by Interscope Records to coincide with the band's Behind the Music episode. It contains previously released songs from the band's first three studio albums, and one non-album B-side ("Speeding", recorded during the sessions for their second album, 1982's Vacation).

The compilation album was released a year before the group definitively reunited for their comeback studio album God Bless the Go-Go's, which was released in 2001.

== Track listing ==
1. "We Got the Beat"
2. "Our Lips Are Sealed"
3. "Lust to Love"
4. "Skidmarks on My Heart"
5. "This Town"
6. "Can't Stop the World"
7. "Fading Fast"
8. "Vacation"
9. "Beatnik Beach"
10. "Get Up and Go"
11. "Speeding" (B-side from Vacation sessions)
12. "Girl of 100 Lists"
13. "Head over Heels"
14. "Turn to You"
15. "Yes or No"
16. "I'm the Only One"
17. "Mercenary"
- Tracks 1 to 7 are from Beauty and the Beat, 1981
- Tracks 8 to 10 and 12 are from Vacation, 1982
- Tracks 13 to 17 from Talk Show, 1984
