= Return to the Valley of the Go-Go's =

Compilation album by the Go-Go's
- Released: October 18, 1994
- Genre: Pop rock, new wave
- Length: 57:09 (1×CD); 1:50:37 (2×CD)
- Label: I.R.S.
- Producer: Gregg Edward, Rob Freeman, Richard Gottehrer

The Go-Go's chronology
Greatest (1990)	Return to the Valley of the Go-Go's (1994)	VH1 Behind the Music: Go-Go's Collection (2000)

Singles from Return to the Valley of the Go-Go's
- 1. "The Whole World Lost Its Head" Released: 1994; 2. "Good Girl" Released: 1994

Return to the Valley of the Go-Go's is the second compilation album by American rock band the Go-Go's, released in 1994. The compilation was released in two versions, a single-disc version and an expanded double-disc version.

== Background ==
Despite the tensions that had resulted in their dissolution in 1985, the Go-Go's gradually began to reassemble; songwriter and keyboardist Charlotte Caffey wrote for and performed on most of singer Belinda Carlisle's solo albums. The group's members eventually resolved legal and creative differences and began to collaborate as a band again, beginning with a compilation album that would be a more comprehensive representation of the band than their 1990 greatest hits album.

Return to the Valley of the Go-Go's documents the history of the Go-Go's from their genesis in the Los Angeles punk rock scene through their success as a mainstream new wave band. The compilation includes rehearsal, demo, and live recordings that had never been previously released, the original Stiff Records version of the band's first single "We Got the Beat", as well as the group's major hits, B-sides, and deeper tracks culled from the studio sessions that generated the Go-Go's' first three LPs. The collection also features new live material and three new "reunion tracks" written and studio-recorded by the band in 1994 for the collection. One of these new songs, "The Whole World Lost Its Head", gave the band its first top 40 hit in Britain.

The CD release includes a booklet that features photos and liner notes from the members of the band, including a group history, reflections, and anecdotes about each member's favorite songs.

== Critical reception ==
Professional ratings
Review scores
Source	Rating
AllMusic	4.5/5 stars
Entertainment Weekly	A−
NME	3/10
The Rolling Stone Album Guide	3/5 stars

Writing for Rolling Stone, critic Paul Corio said that the compilation "offers trippy joy in abundance." In a retrospective review, AllMusic's Ned Raggett ranked Return to the Valley of the Go-Go's, compared to other best-of compilations of the band, as "the clearest winner, by a long shot."

== Track listing ==
=== Single-disc version ===
No.	Title	Writer(s)	Length
1.	"Living at the Canterbury / Party Pose" (live at rehearsal, 2/79)	Jane Wiedlin ("Living at the Canterbury") / Charlotte Caffey, Wiedlin ("Party Pose")	4:30
2.	"Fashion Seekers" (intro – live at rehearsal, 2/79; main song – live at the Mabuhay, San Francisco, 8/79)	Caffey, Joseph Fleury	3:08
3.	"He's So Strange" (live at rehearsal, 1/80)	Caffey, Leonard Phillips, Glen Custis, Wiedlin	4:11
4.	"London Boys" (live at Palos Verdes High School, LA, 12/81)	Wiedlin, Don Bolles	2:39
5.	"Beatnik Beach" (live at Palos Verdes High School, LA, 12/81)	Caffey, Belinda Carlisle	2:43
6.	"Cool Jerk" (previously unreleased demo)	Donald Storball	2:31
7.	"We Got the Beat" (single mix)	Caffey	2:31
8.	"Our Lips Are Sealed" (from Beauty and the Beat)	Wiedlin, Terry Hall	2:45
9.	"Surfing and Spying" (B-side)	Caffey	1:57
10.	"Vacation" (from Vacation)	Kathy Valentine, Caffey, Wiedlin	2:58
11.	"Speeding" (B-side)	Caffey, Wiedlin	2:07
12.	"Good for Gone" (B-side)	Gina Schock, Valentine	2:55
13.	"Head over Heels" (from Talk Show)	Caffey, Valentine	3:37
14.	"Can't Stop the World" (live at the Greek, LA, 8/84)	Valentine	3:23
15.	"Mercenary" (acoustic, Universal Amphitheatre, LA, 12/90)	Wiedlin, Valentine, Caffey	4:33
16.	"Good Girl" (reunion track, '94)	Caffey, Wiedlin	3:36
17.	"Beautiful" (reunion track, '94)	Schock, Caffey	3:59
18.	"The Whole World Lost Its Head" (reunion track, '94)	Valentine, Wiedlin	2:56

Japanese CD edition bonus tracks
No.	Title	Writer(s)	Length
19.	"Screaming" (live at the Mabuhay, San Francisco, 8/79)	Caffey, Wiedlin	2:10
20.	"Turn to You" (from Talk Show)	Caffey, Wiedlin	3:50

=== Double-disc version ===
Disc one
No.	Title	Writer(s)	Length
1.	"Living at the Canterbury / Party Pose" (live at rehearsal, 2/79)	Wiedlin ("Living at the Canterbury") / Caffey, Wiedlin ("Party Pose")	4:30
2.	"Screaming" (live at the Mabuhay, San Francisco, 8/79)	Caffey, Wiedlin	2:10
3.	"Johnny Are You Queer?" (live at the Mabuhay, San Francisco, 8/79)	Bobby Paine, Larson Paine	2:06
4.	"Fun with Ropes" (live at the Mabuhay, San Francisco, 8/79)	Wiedlin	2:12
5.	"Fashion Seekers" (intro – live at rehearsal, 2/79; main song – live at the Mabuhay, San Francisco, 8/79)	Caffey, Fleury	3:08
6.	"Blades" (live at rehearsal, 1/80)	Wiedlin, Carlisle, Margot Olavarria	2:34
7.	"He's So Strange" (live at rehearsal, 1/80)	Caffey, Phillips, Custis, Wiedlin	4:11
8.	"London Boys" (live at Palos Verdes High School, LA, 12/81)	Wiedlin, Bolles	2:39
9.	"Let's Have a Party" (live at Palos Verdes High School, LA, 12/81)	Jessie Mae Robinson	1:31
10.	"Beatnik Beach" (live at Palos Verdes High School, LA, 12/81)	Caffey, Carlisle	2:43
11.	"(Remember) Walking in the Sand" (live at Palos Verdes High School, LA, 12/81)	Shadow Morton	3:06
12.	"Lust to Love" (previously unreleased demo)	Caffey, Wiedlin	3:27
13.	"How Much More" (B-side)	Caffey, Wiedlin	3:00
14.	"Cool Jerk" (previously unreleased demo)	Storball	2:31
15.	"We Got the Beat" (single mix)	Caffey	2:31
16.	"Skidmarks on My Heart" (from Beauty and the Beat)	Caffey, Carlisle	3:05
17.	"This Town" (from Beauty and the Beat)	Caffey, Wiedlin	3:18
18.	"Our Lips Are Sealed" (from Beauty and the Beat)	Wiedlin, Hall	2:45

Disc two
No.	Title	Writer(s)	Length
1.	"Surfing and Spying" (B-side)	Caffey	1:57
2.	"Vacation" (from Vacation)	Valentine, Caffey, Wiedlin	2:58
3.	"Speeding" (B-side)	Caffey, Wiedlin	2:07
4.	"Get Up and Go" (from Vacation)	Caffey, Wiedlin	3:17
5.	"It's Everything but Party Time" (from Vacation)	Wiedlin, Schock	3:20
6.	"Beneath the Blue Sky" (from Talk Show)	Valentine, Wiedlin	3:03
7.	"Good for Gone" (B-side)	Schock, Valentine	2:55
8.	"Head over Heels" (from Talk Show)	Caffey, Valentine	3:37
9.	"Turn to You" (from Talk Show)	Caffey, Wiedlin	3:50
10.	"Yes or No" (single mix)	Wiedlin, Ron Mael, Russell Mael	3:36
11.	"I'm with You" (live at the Greek, LA, 8/84)	Schock, Wiedlin	3:37
12.	"We Don't Get Along" (live at Nakano Sunplaza, Tokyo, 6/82)	Valentine	2:41
13.	"Can't Stop the World" (live at the Greek, LA, 8/84)	Valentine	3:23
14.	"I'm the Only One" (live at the Greek, LA, 8/84)	Valentine, Danny B. Harvey, Carlene Carter	3:26
15.	"Mercenary" (acoustic, Universal Amphitheatre, LA, 12/90)	Wiedlin, Valentine, Caffey	4:33
16.	"Good Girl" (reunion track, '94)	Caffey, Wiedlin	3:36
17.	"Beautiful" (reunion track, '94)	Schock, Caffey	3:59
18.	"The Whole World Lost Its Head" (reunion track, '94)	Valentine, Wiedlin	2:56

== Chart positions ==
=== Albums ===
Chart (1995)	Peak position
Scottish Albums (OCC)	76
UK Albums (OCC)	52

=== Singles ===
Year	Song	U.S. Hot 100	UK Singles Chart
1994	"The Whole World Lost Its Head"	108	29
