= God Bless the Go-Go's =

2001 studio album by the Go-Go's

Studio album by the Go-Go's
- Released: May 15, 2001
- Recorded: 2000–2001
- Studio: Sound City and Sound Image, except "Here You Are" at Moodus Noise and Sunset Sound (Los Angeles, California)
- Genre: Pop punk; pop rock
- Length: 45:08
- Label: Beyond
- Producer: Paul Q. Kolderie; Sean Slade; Rick Neigher

The Go-Go's chronology
VH1 Behind the Music: Go-Go's Collection (2000)	God Bless the Go-Go's (2001)

Alternative cover
- Deluxe edition cover

Singles from God Bless the Go-Go's
- 1. "Unforgiven" Released: March 19, 2001; 2. "Apology" Released: July 23, 2001

God Bless the Go-Go's is the fourth and final studio album by American rock band the Go-Go's, released on May 15, 2001, by Beyond Music. It was the band's first studio album after a lengthy hiatus, and was released 17 years after their previous album Talk Show (1984).

While many of the band's earlier hits had been written within the band, the Go-Go's worked with other artists for God Bless the Go-Go's; songwriters that contributed to the album included Billie Joe Armstrong, Jill Sobule and Susanna Hoffs, among other musicians.

== Release ==
God Bless the Go-Go's was released on May 15, 2001, by the Beyond Music label. The album peaked at number 57 on the US Billboard 200. "Unforgiven" served as the album's lead single, and was released to radio on March 19, 2001, followed by a second single, "Apology", on July 23, 2001.

For the album's 20th anniversary, God Bless the Go-Go's was reissued on May 14, 2021, by Eagle Records. The original album was released on vinyl for the first time, while a deluxe edition, featuring two bonus tracks and new cover art, was released on CD and digitally.

== Critical reception ==
Professional ratings
Aggregate scores
Source	Rating
Metacritic	68/100
Review scores
Source	Rating
AllMusic	2.5/5 stars
Blender	4/5 stars
Classic Pop	4/5 stars
Entertainment Weekly	B+
Los Angeles Times	3/4 stars
Q	3/5 stars
Record Collector	4/5 stars
Rolling Stone	3/5 stars
Spin	6/10
Uncut	3/5 stars

God Bless the Go-Go's received a score of 68 out of 100 from Metacritic based on generally favorable reviews from critics. Los Angeles Times critic Marc Weingarten found that "for a band that has been dormant for so long, the musical pieces all fit together surprisingly snugly", while in Billboard, Michael Paoletta praised the album as a "deliriously buoyant" record of "unadulterated adult-made pop". "Sharply written, energetically performed, and slickly produced," judged Keith Phipps of The A.V. Club, "it actually sounds like the album Go-Go's fans have waited 17 years to hear."

Rolling Stone reviewer Arion Berger commented, "The album doesn't attempt to update the band's sound with hip-hop moves or electronic frippery, for which God should bless 'em, indeed. The girls' hold on the current pop world remains so strong that Green Day's Billie Joe Armstrong co-writes a song ('Unforgiven') in impeccable Go-Go's drag." AllMusic's Peter Fawthrop was more ambivalent, writing that "the group took the familiar route with tracks that sound every bit as Go-Go's as their previous records. Every bit as Go-Go's, that is, as their non-hits and less remarkable material. While the Go-Go's sound is intact, there is not a 'We Got the Beat' or a 'Head over Heels' to be found. It is feasible that in this age of pop rebirth, the Go-Go's decided it was now or never."

== Track listing ==
No.	Title	Writer(s)	Length
1.	"La La Land"	Charlotte Caffey; Kathy Valentine	3:01
2.	"Unforgiven"	Caffey; Jane Wiedlin; Billie Joe Armstrong	3:23
3.	"Apology"	Valentine; Heatherton	3:57
4.	"Stuck in My Car"	Caffey; Wiedlin; Peter Stuart	3:36
5.	"Vision of Nowness"	Valentine; Craig Ross	2:55
6.	"Here You Are"	Caffey; Wiedlin; Jim Vallance	4:01
7.	"Automatic Rainy Day"	Gina Schock; Wiedlin; Steve Plunkett	3:17
8.	"Kissing Asphalt"	Caffey	2:49
9.	"Insincere"	Caffey; Wiedlin	3:45
10.	"Sonic Superslide"	Caffey; Belinda Carlisle; Schock; Valentine; Wiedlin	3:33
11.	"Throw Me a Curve"	Caffey; Carlisle; Schock; Valentine; Wiedlin	3:11
12.	"Talking Myself Down"	Caffey; Wiedlin; Susanna Hoffs	3:55
13.	"Daisy Chain"	Wiedlin; Valentine; Jill Sobule	3:45

Japanese edition bonus track
No.	Title	Writer(s)	Length
14.	"King of Confusion"	Caffey; Valentine; Bill Bartell	3:07

UK edition bonus track
No.	Title	Writer(s)	Length
14.	"I Think I Need Sleep"	Caffey; Anna Waronker	3:30

== Personnel ==
Credits are adapted from the album's liner notes.

Band members

- Belinda Carlisle – lead vocals
- Charlotte Caffey – lead guitar, piano, backing vocals
- Jane Wiedlin – rhythm guitar, backing vocals
- Kathy Valentine – bass guitar, backing vocals
- Gina Schock – drums, percussion

Additional musicians

- Billie Joe Armstrong – additional guitar and vocals on "Unforgiven"
- Rami Jaffee – Mellotron and Chamberlin on "Here You Are"
- Peggy Baldwin – cello on "Here You Are"
- Roger Manning – Mellotron on "Daisy Chain"

Production

- Paul Q. Kolderie, Sean Slade – production, engineering, mixing at the Record Plant, Fort Apache Studios, the Magic Shop and Record One
- Rick Neigher – production and engineering on track 6
- Mike Shipley – mixing on tracks 1–4
- Marc DeSisto – mixing on track 6 at Skip Saylor
- Tom Weir – mixing on track 13
- Mike King, Matt Levella, Chris Reynolds, Jaymz Hardy-Martin III – assistance
- Steve Hall – mastering at Future Disc

Design

- Ginger Canzoneri – cover art direction
- Eric Roinestad – cover design
- DeDe Kelez – second cover design
- Susan McEowen – production art
- Maryanne Bilham, Chris Cuffaro – photography
- Jennifer McManus – styling
- Robin Slater, John Stapleton – makeup
- Ned Neidhardt – hair

== Charts ==
Chart (2001–2021)	Peak position
Scottish Albums (OCC)	40
UK Albums Sales (OCC)	46
US Billboard 200	57
