= Head over Heels (musical) =

American jukebox musical comedy

Head Over Heels
- 2018 Broadway Playbill
- Music: The Go-Go's and Belinda Carlisle
- Lyrics: The Go-Go's and Belinda Carlisle
- Book: Conceived by & original book by Jeff Whitty; adapted by James Magruder
- Basis: The Countess of Pembroke's Arcadia by Sir Philip Sidney
- Productions: 2015 Oregon Shakespeare Festival; 2018 San Francisco; 2018 Broadway

Head Over Heels is a jukebox musical comedy with music and lyrics from the catalog of The Go-Go's and its lead singer and most successful solo artist, Belinda Carlisle. Jeff Whitty conceived the show and wrote the original book, which was then adapted by James Magruder after Whitty left the show due to conflict with incoming director Michael Mayer. The plot of the show is adapted from The Countess of Pembroke's Arcadia written by Sir Philip Sidney in the 16th century. Head Over Heels opened at the Oregon Shakespeare Festival in June 2015, running for five months in their outdoor theater. Three years later, after Whitty's departure, Head Over Heels opened on Broadway on July 26, 2018, at the Hudson Theatre; its final Broadway performance was January 6, 2019. Licensing rights for future productions were acquired by Broadway Licensing in 2018. A cast album was released on October 12, 2018.

== Synopsis of Broadway Production ==
Head Over Heels is a jukebox musical that adapts the plot of The Countess of Pembroke's Arcadia, the 16th-century prose romance by Sir Philip Sidney. It resembles the Old Arcadia more closely than the New Arcadia. Unlike Jeff Whitty's original, which hewed to Sidney's story structure regarding a King outrunning four prophesies, the plotline of the Broadway story follows the royal family of Arcadia on their journey to keep their famous "Beat".

=== Act 1 ===
The kingdom of Arcadia is peaceful and prosperous, its people's lives governed by a mysterious "Beat" ("We Got the Beat"). King Basilius and his wife Gynecia have two daughters. The younger, Philoclea, is in love with her childhood friend Musidorus, a shepherd who is not considered an appropriate match. The older, Pamela, is the most beautiful woman in the land, though she confesses to being jealous of her "plain" sister since she does not have to deal with suitors ("Beautiful"). As Basilius berates Pamela for sending another round of suitors away, a message arrives from Arcadia's new oracle Pythio, asking for a meeting with the royal family and warning that Arcadia may lose its famous Beat. Basilius and his loyal viceroy Dametas depart for the forest, with Gynecia reminding her hot-headed husband to listen to what Pythio has to say.

Pythio, who is non-binary, explains that the kingdom has become too rigid and traditional, and gives Basilius and Dametas four prophecies. ("Vision of Nowness")

1. "Thy younger daughter will bring a liar to bed. He thou shall forbid, she he'll then assume."
2. "Thou elder daughter will consent to wed. She'll consummate her love but with no groom."
3. "Thou with thy wife, adult’ry shall commit"
4. "You will meet and make way for a better king"

They explain that as these prophecies are fulfilled, four flags will fall. If all four fall, the Beat will be lost and the kingdom will succumb to a permanent distemperature, but it is possible to cheat the Oracle. Basilius, for whom the new king is the most pressing matter, decides to leave Arcadia to find and slay him on the road, bringing everyone along so he can keep watchful eyes on his wife and daughters. He lies to his family, explaining that Pythio only prophesied happy ends and that they must hunt a golden stag on the road. Gynecia is suspicious, but the kingdom prepares to embark anyway ("Get Up and Go"). As they are about to leave, Musidorus arrives, and Philoclea persuades her father to let him ask for her hand. The ensuing proposal is inelegant but heartfelt, and Gynecia is convinced. Basilius still thinks that Musidorus will be unable to provide for his daughter, and eventually the two agree. As Philoclea leaves, Musidorus repeats his vow of love and impulsively decides to follow the group ("Mad About You").

On the road, Philoclea asks her sister and Mopsa, Dametas' daughter and Pamela's loyal handmaid, for advice about Musidorus. Pamela tells her that she must do what is best for the kingdom, even if it hurts her specifically ("Good Girl"). Musidorus realizes that his journey was not well-planned, and worries that he may die in the forest before coming across a dead theatre troupe and their belongings. Pythio arrives and tells Musidorus to let his shepherd identity die, and take on a new personage so he can join Philoclea. They suggest the wardrobe and weapons of the Amazon, and Musidorus agrees ("Vision of Nowness" (Reprise)/"Beautiful" (Reprise)). As the traveling kingdom is attacked by a lion, Musidorus rescues Philoclea, and is asked to join the group on their journey. "Cleophila" agrees.

When Mopsa realizes that Pamela's ideal suitor might not be a man at all, she attempts to reassure Pamela by confessing that she has similar feelings. Pamela does not understand, and releases her from her duties. An angry Mopsa decides to leave and "follow her inclinations" to Lesbos ("Automatic Rainy Day"). Cleophila has become quite popular, with Basilius, Pamela, and Gynecia (who learns that "she" is a man, but not her true identity) all developing feelings for her, though Cleophila only has eyes for Philoclea ("Cool Jerk"). While away, Mopsa realizes that her feelings for Pamela remain ("Vacation").

Musidorus is able to evade Dametas' watchful eye with his female disguise, and is about to confess to Philoclea before a jealous and distraught Pamela interrupts them, destroying the room ("How Much More"). Philoclea is shocked that Pamela would be jealous of her and her new friend, and when Cleophila admits that she had reason to be, she realizes that the Amazon is actually Musidorus, and they embrace. Mopsa arrives and confesses her love to Pamela, who reciprocates. As Pythio's first two flags fall, both couples vow to keep their love secret ("Our Lips are Sealed").

=== Act 2 ===
As the trip continues, both couples are happy in their new relationships, though Musidorus must also deal with the king and queen's feelings for Cleophila ("Head Over Heels"). Dametas attempts to warn Basilius about the flags, but he brushes it off, as he is still king and no men have been seen with his daughters. He gives Cleophila a letter for "the one I love most". Doubtful but reassured by Philoclea that this must be for the queen, Cleophila delivers it to her. Basilius and Gynecia make plans to meet each other secretly in the caves, both believing they are writing to Cleophila ("This Old Feeling"). Confused by Mopsa's action, Dametas assures her that he will find her a husband. Mopsa and Pamela are unsure of what their relationship means, but they are elated to find another couple like themselves when they witness Philoclea and Cleophila kissing ("Turn to You").

Gynecia and Basilius both arrive in the pitch black cave to meet Cleophila, actually meeting each other. Pythio facilitates their conjoining, marking the fulfillment of the third prophecy ("Heaven is a Place on Earth"). Mopsa and Pamela tell their secret to their friends, prompting the other two to reveal that Cleophila is actually Musidorus. Though Pamela is initially annoyed that they do not have the same secret, the two sisters reconcile. Basilius and Gynecia arrive arguing, Dametas arrives with all three flags, and confusion breaks out when husband and wife both point out Cleophila as the one they have adultered with. An angry Philoclea explains Cleophila's true identity and that Musidorus is her love, not either of her parents. As the king and queen realize what really happened, Basilius decides that Musidorus must be the new king and challenges him to a duel ("Lust to Love"). Musidorus fights valiantly but is eventually slain.

As Philoclea mourns her lost love ("Here You Are"), Basilius understands the error of his ways. He takes off the crown, offering it to Gynecia, who he believes will be a better ruler. As she takes it, the fourth flag falls and, with all prophecies fulfilled, the citizens of Arcadia are struck with the loss of the Beat. Gynecia tells her people to pray to the gods for a new Beat, and one emerges, as does a golden stag. It is actually Musidorus, revived and returned to the overjoyed Philoclea, who proclaims her love and vows to marry him. Dametas realizes there is still one prophecy, prompting Pamela and Mopsa to admit their love to their surprised but accepting parents. As Dametas wishes that Mopsa's mother could be there, Pythio arrives. They are actually Dametas' lost wife, banished from Arcadia after they confessed their gender identity to him. They promise not to leave Mopsa again, and Dametas apologizes for his cruel treatment, embracing Pythio for who they truly are ("Mad About You" (Reprise)). Musidorus reveals his own gender fluidity, explaining that he plans to "keep Cleophila around". Basilius decides to leave his people, but Gynecia tells him to stay, as she thinks he will become a better man without a crown.

The reunited group travels to the nearest city, only for it to be Arcadia. Realizing that they have traveled in a circle, the group considers how they have changed on their journey and vow to become a wiser and more accepting society with their new Beat ("Finale").

== Productions ==
=== Oregon Shakespeare Festival (2015) ===
The show made its world premiere at the Oregon Shakespeare Festival in Ashland, Oregon on June 3, 2015, with an opening on June 13. The production ran until October 10 and was directed by Ed Sylvanus Iskandar.

In 2016, Michael Mayer replaced Iskandar as director. Also joining the re-imagined creative team were music supervisor Tom Kitt (who previously worked with Mayer on American Idiot) and James Magruder to adapt Whitty's original libretto.

=== San Francisco (2018) ===
The show played the Curran Theatre in San Francisco between April 10 and May 6, 2018. The production was billed as the official pre-Broadway engagement. For this production, Michael Mayer directed.

=== Broadway (2018) ===
The show began previews at the Hudson Theatre on June 23, 2018. The show officially opened on July 26, 2018. The show closed on January 6, 2019, after 36 previews and 164 performances.

Christine Russell, Donovan Leitch, and Rick Ferrari are the shows's lead producers.

Arianne Phillips is the show's costume designer, and Spencer Liff is the choreographer. Kevin Adams did the lighting design, Andrew Lazarow did the projection design, Kai Harada did the sound design, and Julian Crouch did the scenic and puppet design.

Making her Broadway debut in the role of Pythio, Peppermint became the first transgender woman to originate a principal role on Broadway.

=== Hope Mill Theatre, Manchester (2023) ===
The show opened at the Hope Mill Theatre in Manchester on 1 February 2023, for its European premiere. The cast included Luke Bayer as Musidorus, Iz Hesketh as Pythio and Maiya Quansah-Breed as Philoclea.

== Musical numbers ==
Songwriters listed in parentheses.

Act I

- "We Got the Beat" (Charlotte Caffey) – Company (minus Pythio)
- "Beautiful" (Gina Schock, Caffey) – Pamela and Ensemble
- "Vision of Nowness" (Kathy Valentine, Craig Ross) – Pythio and Ensemble
- "Get Up and Go" (Jane Wiedlin, Caffey) – Basilius, Gynecia, Dametas, Philoclea, Pamela, and Ensemble
- "Mad About You" (Paula Jean Brown, James Whelan, Mitchel Young Evans) – Musidorus and Male Ensemble
- "Good Girl" (Caffey, Wiedlin) – Philoclea, Mopsa and Pamela
- "Vision of Nowness / Beautiful" (Reprise)* (Valentine, Ross, Schock, Caffey) – Musidorus, Pythio and Ensemble
- "Automatic Rainy Day" (Schock, Wiedlin, Steve Plunkett) – Pamela and Mopsa
- "Cool Jerk"* (Donald Storball) – Company
- "Vacation" (Caffey, Valentine, Wiedlin) – Mopsa and Female Ensemble
- "How Much More" (Caffey, Wiedlin) – Pamela
- "Our Lips Are Sealed" (Wiedlin, Terry Hall) – Musidorus, Philoclea, Pamela, Mopsa, Pythio and Ensemble

Act II

- "Head Over Heels" (Caffey, Valentine) – Musidorus, Philoclea, Mopsa, Pamela and Company
- "This Old Feeling" (Wiedlin, Caffey) – Gynecia and Basilius
- "Turn to You" (Caffey, Wiedlin) – Mopsa, Pamela and Ensemble
- "Heaven Is a Place on Earth" (Rick Nowels, Ellen Shipley) – Pythio, Gynecia, Basilius and Ensemble
- "Lust to Love"* (Caffey, Wiedlin) – Basilius and Ensemble
- "Here You Are" (Caffey, Wiedlin, Jim Vallance) – Philoclea, Gynecia, Pamela, Bausilius, and Company
- "Mad About You" (Reprise)* (Brown, Whelan, Evans) – Philoclea, Musidorus, Pamela, Mopsa, Dametas, Pythio
- "Finale" (Caffey, Wiedlin, Belinda Carlisle) – Company
- "Get Up and Go (Reprise)" (Caffey, Wiedlin) – Band

At various moments in the show, "Skidmarks on My Heart" is played to signify realizations by the characters. It is included as a hidden track on the cast recording at the end of "Finale."

(*) Not included on the original Broadway cast recording.

=== Recording ===
An original cast album was produced through Sony Masterworks Broadway; it was digitally released on October 12, 2018, and the CD was released on November 9, 2018. The album features three bonus tracks: "Turn to You (Pre-Prise)," an acoustic version of "Automatic Rainy Day," and The Go-Go's performance of "This Town." The album was engineered by Isaiah Abolin and Lawrence Manchester, produced by Scott M. Riesett and Tom Kitt, and co-produced by Louise Gund and Christine Russell. The album's cover art features all the principal actors except Peppermint and Tom Alan Robbins.

== Characters and original cast ==
Original casts of major productions

Character	Oregon	San Francisco	Broadway	Manchester
Character	2015	2018		2023
Basilius	Michael Sharon	Jeremy Kushnier	Jeremy Kushnier	Fed Zanni
Gynecia	Miriam A. Laube	Rachel York	Rachel York	Julie Stark
Pamela	Bonnie Milligan	Bonnie Milligan	Bonnie Milligan	Jenny O'Leary
Philoclea	Tala Ashe	Alexandra Socha	Alexandra Socha	Maiya Quansah-Breed
Dametas	David Kelly	Tom Alan Robbins	Tom Alan Robbins	Daniel Page
Mopsa	Britney Simpson	Taylor Iman Jones	Taylor Iman Jones	Khadija Sallet
Musidorus	Dylan Paul	Andrew Durand	Andrew Durand	Luke Bayer
Pythio	—N/a	Peppermint	Peppermint	Iz Hesketh

== Reception ==
Writing for Deadline, Greg Evans summed up his impression of the musical as "occasionally amusing, occasionally cloying", expressing disappointment that many popular Go-Go's songs appeared to have been flattened over the years the musical spent in development. In Entertainment Weekly, Kelly Connolly viewed the show more favorably, praising "the charismatic cast" and Michael Mayer's "joyful production"; she gave the A− score overall.

== Controversy ==
In March 2023, original librettist Jeff Whitty published an essay alleging severe mistreatment by the Broadway producers, his agent, and his lawyer, including—variously—exploitation, harassment, threats, and theft of royalties for Head Over Heels. His former agent John Buzzetti and former attorney Conrad Rippy declined to comment on the allegations.

== Awards and nominations ==
=== Broadway production ===
Year	Award	Category	Nominee	Result
2019	Outer Critics Circle Awards	Outstanding New Broadway Musical		Nominated
2019	Outer Critics Circle Awards	Outstanding Book of a Musical (Broadway or Off-Broadway)	Jeff Whitty and James Magruder	Nominated
2019	Outer Critics Circle Awards	Outstanding Costume Design (Play or Musical)	Arianne Phillips	Nominated
2019	Outer Critics Circle Awards	Outstanding Featured Actress in a Musical	Bonnie Milligan	Nominated
2019	Drama League Awards	Outstanding Production of a Broadway or Off-Broadway Musical		Nominated
2019	Drama League Awards	Distinguished Performance Award	Bonnie Milligan	Nominated
