= Unforgiven (The Go-Go's song) =

2001 single by the Go-Go's

Single by the Go-Go's

from the album God Bless the Go-Go's
- Released: March 19, 2001
- Length: 3:23
- Label: Beyond
- Songwriters: Charlotte Caffey; Jane Wiedlin; Billie Joe Armstrong
- Producers: Paul Q. Kolderie; Sean Slade

The Go-Go's singles chronology
"The Whole World Lost Its Head" (1994)	"Unforgiven" (2001)	"Apology" (2001)

"Unforgiven" is a song by American rock band the Go-Go's. It was released as the first single from their fourth studio album God Bless the Go-Go's (2001). The song, written by Go-Go's members Charlotte Caffey and Jane Wiedlin in collaboration with Green Day frontman Billie Joe Armstrong, was the first new single released by the band since 1994's "The Whole World Lost Its Head".

== Charts ==
=== Weekly charts ===
Chart (2001)	Peak position
US Adult Top 40 (Billboard)	22

=== Year-end charts ===
Chart (2001)	Position
US Adult Top 40 (Billboard)	67

== Release history ==
Region	Date	Format(s)	Label(s)	Ref.
United States	March 19, 2001	Adult album alternative radio; hot adult contemporary radio; modern adult contemporary radio	Beyond	
United States	March 20, 2001	Alternative radio	Beyond	
United States	April 23, 2001	Contemporary hit radio	Beyond	
