= Beauty and the Beat (The Go-Go's album) =

Studio album by the Go-Go's
- Released: July 14, 1981
- Recorded: 1980-1981
- Studios: Penny Lane, Record Plant and Sound Mixers, New York City
- Genres: New wave; pop rock; power pop; surf rock
- Length: 35:34
- Label: I.R.S.
- Producers: Richard Gottehrer; Rob Freeman

The Go-Go's chronology
| Beauty and the Beat (1981) | Vacation (1982) |

Singles from Beauty and the Beat
- 1. "We Got the Beat" Released: May 9, 1980; 2. "Our Lips Are Sealed" Released: June 16, 1981; 3. "Automatic" Released: February 26, 1982

Beauty and the Beat is the debut album by American rock band the Go-Go's. It was released on July 14, 1981, by the I.R.S. Records label.

Bolstered by its two Hot 100 hit singles "Our Lips Are Sealed" and "We Got the Beat", Beauty and the Beat reached number one on the Billboard Top LPs & Tape chart in March 1982, and eventually ranked second on Billboard's 1982 year-end albums chart. The album sold in excess of two million copies, and was RIAA-certified double platinum, qualifying it as one of the most successful debut albums of all time. Critically acclaimed, it has been described as one of the cornerstone albums of American new wave music. In 2026, the album was selected by the Library of Congress for preservation in the National Recording Registry for its "cultural, historical or aesthetic importance in the nation's recorded sound heritage."

The title is a play on the European fairy tale "Beauty and the Beast".

== Background ==
In the late 1970s, Belinda Carlisle, Jane Wiedlin, and Margot Olavarria met while attending punk rock shows in California. The three attended the Sex Pistols' final performance in San Francisco in January 1978, and afterwards were inspired to form their own band. Although none of them actually knew how to play instruments, they quickly learned, and began playing in Hollywood nightclubs under the name the Go-Go's. Carlisle was the singer, Wiedlin played rhythm guitar, Olavarria played bass and the newly added Elissa Bello played drums. A few months later, Charlotte Caffey joined the band as the lead guitarist since she had experience writing music with other groups like the Eyes. The Go-Go's developed a reputation within the Hollywood punk scene and were invited to open for the band Madness on a UK tour. While on tour, the Go-Go's recorded an extended play for Stiff Records.

Tensions between band members resulted in Bello and Olavarria leaving the Go-Go's and they were replaced by drummer Gina Schock and bassist Kathy Valentine. Around this time, the Go-Go's began to move toward a more pop rock-driven sound, influenced by the burgeoning new wave genre. Although their reputation continued to grow, they were unable to attract attention from major record labels. At a special showcase for A&R representatives at the Starwood, the Go-Go's did not get a single offer. Carlisle believes this was because record executives were sexist and did not want to sign an all-female band. The only label that expressed interest was the indie label I.R.S. Records. In a 1982 Rolling Stone interview, Valentine said: "IRS was where you went if you couldn't get a deal with a real label." On April 1, 1981, I.R.S. cofounder Miles Copeland III signed the Go-Go's.

In the 2020 documentary The Go-Go's, Carlisle claimed to have come up with the idea for the album cover, saying she wanted something "timeless" and "incognito." The towels the band used for the shoot were returned to the Macy's they were bought from earlier that day. Initially the album was released with a peach colored cover but the band was displeased with the look and later pressings were released with a blue cover.

== Release ==
Beauty and the Beat was released on July 14, 1981 by I.R.S. Records. In the United States, "Our Lips Are Sealed" peaked at number 20 on the Billboard Hot 100 singles chart, while "We Got the Beat", an earlier recording of which had previously been issued by Stiff Records in 1980, reached number two. After a long and steady climb, Beauty and the Beat reached number one on the Billboard Top LPs & Tape chart dated March 6, 1982, the week before "We Got the Beat" entered the top ten of the Hot 100. The album stayed at the top for six weeks, and ranked second on the Billboard year-end albums chart for 1982 (behind the self-titled debut album of Asia).

== Reception ==
Professional ratings
Review scores
| Source | Rating |
|---|---|
| AllMusic | 4.5/5 stars |
| American Songwriter | 4/5 stars |
| The Irish Times | 4/5 stars |
| Mojo | 4/5 stars |
| Pitchfork | 8.3/10 |
| Record Collector | 4/5 stars |
| Rolling Stone | 4/5 stars |
| The Rolling Stone Album Guide | 4/5 stars |
| Spin Alternative Record Guide | 10/10 |
| The Village Voice | B+ |

Beauty and the Beat was released to positive reviews that preceded its eventual summit of the album charts. Robert Christgau wrote in his column for The Village Voice that "unlike so many groups who live and die by the hook, this one's got hooks", while Jon Pareles in Rolling Stone called the album a "solid, likable debut" and said that with "their joyous harmony vocals and insistent 'we,' they've got a community ... and enough self-reliance and sass to take romance as comedy, not tragedy." The album placed 10th in the annual Pazz & Jop critics' poll in The Village Voice for 1981.

The album has since gained in regard. Rolling Stone's Warren Zanes said that the Go-Go's "showed that elemental pop rock & roll remained as viable as ever", and AllMusic editor Stephen Thomas Erlewine wrote that the album "is infectiously cheerful pop, so hooky it's sometimes easy to overlook how well-written these tunes are, but it's the sturdiness of the songs that makes Beauty and the Beat a new wave classic." Reviewing its 2011 reissue, Eric Allen of American Songwriter called Beauty and the Beat "one of the 1980s cornerstone albums of American new wave" and found that it "still holds up surprisingly well thirty years later, which is a testament to the energetic spirit captured in this musical zeitgeist of the 80s", whose success "the Go-Go's were never able to equal or surpass".

NPR Music's Hilary Hughes credited the quintet with perfecting pop-punk's formula through Beauty and the Beat. Though she saw that bands like Blondie and the Ramones showed that pop and punk music "[weren't] mortal enemies", she claimed that the Go-Go's showed the "certifiable success" of the two's fusion. Classic Rock History critic Emily Fagan rated four songs on the album as being among the band's best – the two hit singles plus "Lust to Love" and "How Much More".

"When I was about seven, I discovered the Go-Go's," wrote American actress and author Drew Barrymore in an essay for the magazine V. "I went out and bought their album Beauty and the Beat, and as the vinyl twirled, my whole world changed. I stared at the girls on the cover like they were a gateway to cool. The fact that they were girls made me feel not only invited but more important – like I could be a badass too. I looked over to my Pippi Longstocking poster on the wall and thought, 'Yes! I like girls who rock!'"

=== Legacy ===
In 2003, Beauty and the Beat was ranked number 413 on Rolling Stone's list of the 500 greatest albums of all time, and it later placed on updates of the list at number 414 (in 2012) and at number 400 (in 2020). "Our Lips Are Sealed" has been covered over the years by numerous artists and remains a staple of 1980s playlists. It appeared in Rolling Stone's 2000 list of the 100 greatest pop songs. "We Got the Beat" was named one of the "500 Songs That Shaped Rock and Roll" by the Rock and Roll Hall of Fame.

Capitol and I.R.S. released a 30th anniversary deluxe edition of Beauty and the Beat digitally and on CD on May 17, 2011. Disc one features the remastered original album while disc two contains an entire live show, recorded at the Metro Club in Boston on August 20, 1981. Both Vacation (1982) and Talk Show (1984) were previously issued in remastered CD form in 1999.

In 2016, Edsel Records reissued remastered deluxe editions, all with bonus tracks, of the first three Go-Go's albums.

== Track listing ==
Side one
| No. | Title | Writer(s) | Length |
|---|---|---|---|
| 1. | "Our Lips Are Sealed" | Jane Wiedlin, Terry Hall | 2:45 |
| 2. | "How Much More" | Charlotte Caffey, Wiedlin | 3:06 |
| 3. | "Tonite" | Caffey, Wiedlin, Peter Case | 3:35 |
| 4. | "Lust to Love" | Caffey, Wiedlin | 4:04 |
| 5. | "This Town" | Caffey, Wiedlin | 3:20 |

Side two
| No. | Title | Writer(s) | Length |
|---|---|---|---|
| 6. | "We Got the Beat" | Caffey | 2:36 |
| 7. | "Fading Fast" | Caffey | 3:41 |
| 8. | "Automatic" | Wiedlin | 3:07 |
| 9. | "You Can't Walk in Your Sleep (If You Can't Sleep)" | Caffey, Wiedlin | 2:54 |
| 10. | "Skidmarks on My Heart" | Caffey, Belinda Carlisle | 3:06 |
| 11. | "Can't Stop the World" | Kathy Valentine | 3:20 |

== Personnel ==
Credits are adapted from the album's liner notes.

=== Band members ===
- Belinda Carlisle – lead vocals
- Charlotte Caffey – lead guitar, keyboards, backing vocals
- Gina Schock – drums, percussion
- Kathy Valentine – bass guitar, guitar
- Jane Wiedlin – rhythm guitar, backing vocals, lead vocals on "Our Lips Are Sealed" bridge

=== Production ===
- Richard Gottehrer – production
- Rob Freeman – production, engineering, mixing
- James A. Ball, Ted Blechta, Darroll Gustamachio, Eric Korte, John Terelle – assistant engineering
- Gray Russell – assistant mixing

=== Design ===
- Mike Doud and Ginger Canzoneri – art direction
- Mike Fink – design
- George DuBose – photography
- Cindy Marsh – illustration

== Charts ==
=== Album ===
Chart performance for Beauty and the Beat
| Chart (1981) | Peak position |
|---|---|
| Australian Albums Chart | 27 |
| Canadian RPM100 Albums | 2 |
| Swedish Albums Chart | 20 |
| Billboard 200 (US) | 1 |

=== Singles ===
Chart performance of singles from Beauty and the Beat
| Year | Song | US Hot 100 | US MSR | US Dance | UK singles | CAN singles | AUS singles |
|---|---|---|---|---|---|---|---|
| 1981 | "Our Lips Are Sealed" | 20 | 15 | 10 | 47 | 3 | 2 |
| 1981 | "We Got the Beat" | 2 | 7 | 35 | - | 3 | 29 |

== Certifications ==
Certifications for Beauty and the Beat
| Region | Certification | Certified units/sales |
|---|---|---|
| Canada (Music Canada) | Platinum | 100,000^{^} |
| United States (RIAA) | 2× Platinum | 2,000,000^{^} |
^{^} Shipments figures based on certification alone.

== Accolades ==
Accolades for Beauty and the Beat
| Publication | Country | Accolade | Year | Rank |
|---|---|---|---|---|
| The Village Voice | US | The 1981 Pazz & Jop Critics Poll | 1982 | 10 |
| Rolling Stone | Germany | Albums of the Year | 1982 | No order |
| Spin | US | Top 100 Alternative Albums | 1995 | 91 |
| Rolling Stone | US | Women Who Rock: The 50 Greatest Albums of All Time | 2012 | 34 |
| KCPR DJs | US | Top 100 Records from the 80s | 2002 | 59 |
| Rolling Stone | US | The 500 Greatest Albums of All Time | 2020 | 400 |
| Blender | US | 500 CDs You Must Own Before You Die | 2003 | No order |
| 1001 Albums You Must Hear Before You Die | US | | 2005 | No order |
