= How Much More =

1980 single by the Go-Go's

Single by The Go-Go's
- A-side: "We Got the Beat"
- Released: 1980
- Recorded: 1980
- Genre: Power pop
- Length: 2:59
- Label: Stiff
- Songwriters: Charlotte Caffey; Jane Wiedlin
- Producer: Paul L. Wexler

"How Much More"

Song by The Go-Go's

from the album Beauty and the Beat
- Released: 1981
- Recorded: 1981
- Genre: Power pop
- Length: 3:06
- Label: I.R.S.
- Songwriters: Charlotte Caffey; Jane Wiedlin
- Producers: Richard Gottehrer; Rob Freeman

"How Much More" is a song written by Charlotte Caffey and Jane Wiedlin that was first released as part of the Go-Go's debut single along with "We Got the Beat" in 1980. A re-recorded version was released on their 1981 debut album Beauty and the Beat.

== Background ==
According to Go-Go's lead singer Belinda Carlisle, "How Much More" was written in early 1980 during a spate in which Caffey and Wiedlin wrote several other songs including "We Got the Beat" and "Lust to Love". According to Caffey, she started the song and Wiedlin helped her finish it not long after she joined the band. Caffey said that originally the song "was more pop, but we still couldn’t play very well, so we kind of created a new sound: melodic but raw." Caffey said that she was nervous about bringing a pop song to the band since until then the Go-Go's were primarily a punk rock group. According to Caffey:

I brought in a song called "How Much More." I was really scared because it’s super pop and it’s about a relationship. I was like, "Well, I’m either going to get fired from the band, or maybe they’ll really like it!"...Jane [Wiedlin, rhythm guitarist/backing vocalist] immediately jumped on board and helped me finish it.

Fortunately for Caffey, the band did like the song. Carlisle said that she loved the song the first time she heard it, but it sounded even better after producer Paul Wexler recorded it for the single.

== Reception ==
San Francisco Examiner writer Michael Goldberg noted its lyrics as among several of the Go-Go's early songs that are about "romance and love – and could easily have been written a few decades [earlier]." As an example, Goldberg used the lines "Every night I see you walking/Walking by, walking by/You hold your head so close to hers/I could cry, yeah, I could cry/I want to be that girl tonight."

Allmusic critic Stephen Thomas Erlewine felt that on the album version, producer Richard Gottehrer "sounded down the band's rougher edges", making the song resemble early R.E.M. with its combination of hooks and harmonies with "kick and jangle". LiveAbout critic Steve Peake rated "How Much More" as the Go-Go's 2nd best song of the 1980s, calling it "a spirited, guitar-driven new wave classic that bridges the band's raw early work with its later polished pop." Peake particularly praised Caffey's and Wiedlin's guitar playing but said that "it's ultimately the entire ensemble's synergy that turns this song into the band's finest hit single that never was." Classic Rock History critic Emily Fagen rated it as the Go-Go's 10th best song, calling it a "killer track". Trouser Press critic Ira Robbins and Karen Schlosberg referred to it as an "enduring anthem". Daily Hampshire Gazette critic Ken Maiuri noted that this was the song that had gotten him hooked on college radio and taught him that albums had good songs that were not released as singles. Baltimore Sun writer Geoffery Himes regarded the song as a classic comparable to the Ronettes' "Be My Baby" and the Angels' "My Boyfriend's Back". Music journalist Annie Zaleski said that it "smolders with longing, as well as a bit of jealousy and light self-loathing", citing the line "She's looking good/Just like I would/If it could be me".

"How Much More" was later released on several Go-Go's compilation albums, including Greatest in 1990 and Return to the Valley of The Go-Go's in 1994.

== Live performances ==
The Go-Go's included "How Much More" in their live concerts in 2000. Carlisle said that "I liked that one reviewer along the way noted how we fell perfectly into sync when we played 'How Much More' and chanted 'How much more can I take before I go crazy, oh yeah! That line could have been a mantra for the band as well as all of us individually, especially me."

== Head over Heels ==
"How Much More" was included in the soundtrack of the Broadway musical Head over Heels. New York Times theater critic Ben Brantley noted that "How Much More" was one of the few songs that was sung exuberantly in the play. Daily Beast critic Tim Teeman also specifically praised Bonnie Milligan's performance of the song in his review of the show, saying that:

Milligan’s most glorious moment comes, when furious at everything, she destroys the stage while singing ‘How Much More,’ her volcanic anger temporarily, comically abating as she considers what she should do with the vulnerable contents of a bird cage.

== Supernova version ==
"How Much More"

Single by Supernova
- Released: 1996
- Recorded: 1996
- Genre: Pop punk
- Label: Sympathy for the Record Industry
- Songwriters: Charlotte Caffey; Jane Wiedlin

"How Much More" was released as the sixth single by Orange County pop punk band Supernova, on 7" by Sympathy for the Record Industry in 1996.

CMJ New Music Monthly called the Supernova version "a faithful cover of one of the Go-Go's greatest songs" and noted that "the Supernova men sing it in the original register and preserve the original 'I want to be that girl tonight' hook."

=== Track listing ===
Side A:

- How Much More (Caffey, Wiedlin)

Side B:

- Supernova Intro (live)
- Calling Hong Kong (live)

=== Personnel ===
- Art Mitchell - vocals, bass guitar
- Hayden 'Hank' Thais - guitar, vocals
- Dave Collins - drums, vocals
