= Our Lips Are Sealed =

1981 single by the Go-Go's

Single by the Go-Go's

from the album Beauty and the Beat
- B-side: "Surfing and Spying"
- Released: June 12, 1981
- Genre: Power pop; new wave
- Length: 2:44
- Label: I.R.S.
- Songwriters: Jane Wiedlin; Terry Hall
- Producers: Richard Gottehrer; Rob Freeman

The Go-Go's singles chronology
"We Got the Beat" (1980)	"Our Lips Are Sealed" (1981)	"Automatic" (1982)

"Our Lips Are Sealed" is a song co-written by Jane Wiedlin, guitarist of the Go-Go's, and Terry Hall, singer of the Specials and Fun Boy Three. It was first recorded by the Go-Go's as the opening track on their first album, Beauty and the Beat (1981), and was released as their second single in June 1981. The single eventually reached the top three in Australia and Canada as well as the top 20 in the United States. Originally written and performed with three verses, the song appears in an abbreviated version on Beauty and the Beat. Most of the song's vocals are performed by lead singer Belinda Carlisle, with co-writer Wiedlin singing the bridge.

In 1983, Fun Boy Three released their version of "Our Lips Are Sealed". Issued as a single, the track became a top-ten hit in the United Kingdom. The original version was later included in the jukebox musical Head over Heels that debuted on Broadway in 2018. The Go-Go's also performed the song, along with "Vacation" and "We Got the Beat", during the 2021 Rock and Roll Hall of Fame Induction Ceremony.

== Origins ==
The Go-Go's supported the Specials on the latter's 1980 Seaside Tour of England. According to Jane Wiedlin, she and Terry Hall had a brief affair despite him being in a relationship with another woman at the time. After Wiedlin returned to the United States, Hall mailed her some lyrics, and this led to their co-writing the song. The Go-Go's version is significantly more upbeat than Fun Boy Three's, which Wiedlin describes as "great" but also "gloomier".

== Critical reception ==
Record World described the song as being as "innocent and infectious as pop music can be", with a "steady, pulsating dance beat" and "candy-coated keyboard riffs". In 2000, Rolling Stone & MTV put the Go-Go's' original version of "Our Lips Are Sealed" at No. 57 on a list of 100 Greatest Pop Songs. In 2021, their version was also listed at No. 477 on Rolling Stone's 500 Greatest Songs of All Time.

== Chart performance ==
"Our Lips Are Sealed" peaked at number 20 on the Billboard Hot 100 chart and 15 on the Billboard Top Rock Tracks chart. On the Billboard Disco Top 80 chart, the song peaked at number 10. A song of unusual longevity as a hit, it remained on the Billboard charts until March 1982, long after its peak, ultimately charting for 30 weeks.

== Music video ==
The official music video for the song was directed by Derek Burbidge and filmed in mid-1981 in Los Angeles shortly before the launch of MTV. It features sequences of the band members in carefree tableaux, riding around Beverly Hills in a red 1960 Buick LeSabre convertible (identified via the Internet Movie Cars Database), stopping at a lingerie shop, and splashing around in a fountain, interspersed with footage of the band playing at a club. Contemporary interviews describe it as a quick, informal street shoot.

Jane Wiedlin says the band members were initially unenthusiastic when Miles Copeland, president of their label, I.R.S. Records, told them they would be doing the video. "We were totally bratty", she recalls. The video was financed with unused funds from the Police's video budget.

After riding around the city, the group stop at the Trashy Lingerie store at 402 N La Cienega Boulevard, Los Angeles (34.0782°N 118.3764°W). The band go into the shop while Wiedlin remains in the car to sing the bridge of the song, although Belinda Carlisle can be seen in the driver's seat trying to hide. The day of shooting was very hot, and it was the band's idea to end the video by jumping into the Electric Fountain at the corner of Wilshire Boulevard and Santa Monica Boulevard in Beverly Gardens Park, Beverly Hills (34.0673°N 118.4105°W). Wiedlin later said, "I thought, at any minute the cops are gonna come. This is gonna be so cool".

Wiedlin looks back on the video experience fondly. "I have horrible '80s poodle hair in it", she recalled in a 2011 history of MTV. "But there's a simplicity and innocence to the video that appeals to me."

The music video was played frequently on the fledgling MTV.

== In other media ==
The song appears in Paul F. Ryan's 2002 film Home Room. Alicia (Busy Philipps) tells Deanna (Erika Christensen) that it's the only pop song written about retaining virginity. "Think about it-- 'Our lips are sealed'", says Alicia; Deanna responds "Ewww". Openly inexperienced and abstinent, Deanna later appreciates the song on a car radio and asks for the volume to be turned up so that she can understand the lyrics.

== Personnel ==
- Belinda Carlisle – lead vocals
- Jane Wiedlin – co-lead vocals, rhythm guitar, backing vocals
- Charlotte Caffey – lead guitar, keyboards, backing vocals
- Kathy Valentine – bass
- Gina Schock – drums, percussion

== Charts ==
=== Weekly charts ===
Chart (1981–1982)	Peak position
Australia (Kent Music Report)	2
Canada (CBC)	4
Canada Top Singles (RPM)	3
New Zealand (Recorded Music NZ)	23
Sweden (Sverigetopplistan)	14
UK Singles (Official Charts)	47
US Billboard Hot 100	20
US Disco Top 80 (Billboard)	10
US Rock Top Tracks (Billboard)	15

=== Year-end charts ===
Chart (1982)	Rank
Australia (Kent Music Report)	17
Canada Top Singles (RPM)	12
US Billboard Hot 100	63

== Certifications and sales ==
Region	Certification	Certified units/sales
Australia (ARIA)	Gold	50,000^{^}
^{^} Shipments figures based on certification alone.

== Fun Boy Three version ==
"Our Lips Are Sealed"

Single by Fun Boy Three

from the album Waiting
- Released: April 29, 1983
- Genre: Synth-pop; new wave
- Length: 3:36
- Label: Chrysalis
- Songwriters: Jane Wiedlin, Terry Hall
- Producer: David Byrne

Fun Boy Three singles chronology
"Tunnel of Love" (1983)	"Our Lips Are Sealed" (1983)	"The Farm Yard Connection" (1983)

The following year, co-writer Terry Hall re-recorded the song with his own band, Fun Boy Three. It was included on their second album Waiting and reached number seven on the UK singles chart, and was the last single to chart in the UK before their split later in 1983. Backing vocals were provided by Mo-dettes drummer June Miles-Kingston, who also played drums on the single and the Waiting LP.

=== Track listings ===
2×7-inch single
No.	Title	Writer(s)	Length
1.	"Our Lips Are Sealed" (single version)	Terry Hall, Jane Wiedlin	2:51
2.	"Our Lips Are Sealed" (Urdu version)	Hall, Wiedlin	3:50
3.	"Going Home" (specially recorded by The Old Grey Whistle Test)	Fun Boy Three
4.	"We're Having All the Fun" (specially recorded by The Old Grey Whistle Test)	Fun Boy Three

12-inch single 1
No.	Title	Writer(s)	Length
1.	"Our Lips Are Sealed" (special club remix)	Terry Hall, Jane Wiedlin	6:07
2.	"Our Lips Are Sealed" (single version)	Hall, Wiedlin	2:51
3.	"Our Lips Are Sealed" (Urdu version)	Hall, Wiedlin	3:50

12-inch single 2
No.	Title	Writer(s)	Length
1.	"Our Lips Are Sealed" (remixed version)	Terry Hall, Jane Wiedlin	6:00
2.	"Our Lips Are Sealed" (single version)	Hall, Wiedlin	2:51
3.	"Our Lips Are Sealed" (Urdu version)	Hall, Wiedlin	3:50

=== Charts ===
Chart (1983)	Peak position
Ireland (IRMA)	13
UK Singles (OCC)	7

== Hilary and Haylie Duff version ==
"Our Lips Are Sealed"
- US promotional single cover

Single by Hilary Duff and Haylie Duff

from the album A Cinderella Story
- Released: June 4, 2004
- Genre: Pop
- Length: 2:40
- Label: Hollywood
- Songwriters: Jane Wiedlin; Terry Hall
- Producers: Charlie Midnight; Spider

Hilary Duff singles chronology
"Little Voice" (2004)	"Our Lips Are Sealed" (2004)	"Fly" (2004)

A Cinderella Story singles chronology
"Our Lips Are Sealed" (2004)	"Tell Me Something I Don't Know" (2008)

Audio video
- "Our Lips Are Sealed" on YouTube

American singer Hilary Duff and her sister Haylie Duff covered the song for the soundtrack of the 2004 film A Cinderella Story, in which Hilary starred. Their cover, which was released on June 4, 2004, was produced by Charlie Midnight and Ben Arrindell under his alias Spider. The Duff sisters said in an interview that they had wanted to record together, and Hilary chose "Our Lips Are Sealed" because the "secretive" theme of the song relates to the film A Cinderella Story. The track was included on Hilary's first compilation album, Most Wanted (2005), and was included in the Japanese edition of Hilary's second album, Hilary Duff (2004). It was included in the Japanese and Australian versions of Hilary's second compilation album, Best of Hilary Duff (2008).

=== Critical reception ===
Katy Kroll of Billboard magazine wrote favorably of their cover, describing it as a "sugary remake" that features a "nostalgic mix of synthesizers and soft vocals". While Kroll noted how their version would probably not be as remembered as the original, "the sisters' snappy rendition is poised to introduce a whole new generation of listeners to a decade long gone."

=== Commercial performance ===
In the United States, the song was released only to contemporary hit radio on June 4, 2004, and as such received little success. It failed to enter either the Billboard Hot 100 or Mainstream Top 40 charts, although it did peak at number 39 on Radio & Records' CHR/Pop Airplay chart. As of July 27, 2014, the song had sold 161,000 copies in the United States. In Canada, "Our Lips Are Sealed" peaked at number 41 on the physical singles chart provided by Nielsen SoundScan, which were published on Jam!. The cover received its biggest success in Australia, where it debuted at number 13 on the ARIA Singles Chart on September 12, 2004. It peaked at number eight three weeks later, which tied the song with "So Yesterday" as Hilary's highest peaking song in the country.

=== Music video ===
The single's music video was directed by Chris Applebaum and filmed in Toronto, Canada, in May 2004. Similar to the video for the Go-Go's single, it depicts the Duff sisters driving around town in a car, and is interspersed with footage from A Cinderella Story. A second version of the video, with new scenes and without footage from A Cinderella Story, was included on the Dignity deluxe edition DVD. It received its world premiere on May 31, 2004, via MTV's Making the Video.

=== Track listing ===
Australian CD single

1. "Our Lips Are Sealed" – 2:40
2. "Our Lips Are Sealed" (music video) – 2:50
3. A Cinderella Story movie trailer – 1:44

=== Charts ===
Chart (2004)	Peak position
Australia (ARIA)	8
Canada (Nielsen SoundScan)	41
US CHR/Pop (Radio & Records)	39

=== Release history ===
Release dates and formats for "Our Lips Are Sealed"
Region	Date	Format	Label	Ref.
United States	June 4, 2004	Contemporary hit radio	Hollywood	
Australia	August 30, 2004	CD single	Festival Mushroom	
