= James Magruder =

American dramatist

- Born: 1960 (age 65–66); Washington, D.C., U.S.
- Education: Cornell University (BA); Yale University (MFA, DFA)
- Occupations: Playwright; author; translator
- Writing career
- Notable works: Triumph of Love, Head Over Heels

James Magruder (born 1960) is an American playwright, author, and translator. Magruder received his doctorate in dramaturgy and dramatic criticism at the Yale School of Drama. He is best known for his work on Broadway where he wrote the book for the musical Triumph of Love and adapted Jeff Whitty's original book for the Broadway mounting of the musical Head over Heels.

His translation, Three French Comedies (Yale University Press, 1996) was named an "Outstanding Literary Translation of the Year" by the American Literary Translators Association.

His translation/adaptation of Molière's The Imaginary Invalid was staged by the Yale Repertory Theatre in 1999.

He has also published two short story collections, Let Me See It (2014) and No One is Looking at You (2025), and three novels, Sugarless (2009), Love Slaves of Helen Hadley Hall (2017) and Vamp until Ready (2021). Sugarless was a Lambda Literary Award finalist and was shortlisted for the VCU Cabell First Novelists Award and the 2010 William Saroyan International Writing Prize.

His book, The Play's the Thing, on the first fifty years of the Yale Repertory Theatre was published in 2024.

He is a six-time recipient of the Maryland State Arts Council Individual Artist Award and a five-time fellow of the MacDowell Colony. He has taught at the Yale School of Drama and Swarthmore College.

== Bibliography ==
- Magruder, James (1996). Three French Comedies. Yale University Press.
- Magruder, James (2009). Sugarless. University of Wisconsin Press.
- Magruder, James (2014). Let Me See It. Triquarterly Books/Northwestern University Press.
- Magruder, James (2017). Love Slaves of Helen Hadley Hall. Chelsea Station Editions.
- Magruder, James (2021). Vamp Until Ready. Rattling Good Yarns Press.
- Magruder, James (2024). The Play's the Thing. Yale University Press.
- Magruder, James (2025). No One is Looking at You. Rattling Good Yarns Press.
