= The Go-Go's (film) =

- Poster
- Directed by: Alison Ellwood
- Produced by: Trevor Birney; Corey Russell; Eimhear O'Neill
- Starring: Charlotte Caffey; Belinda Carlisle; Gina Schock; Kathy Valentine; Jane Wiedlin
- Cinematography: Sam Painter
- Edited by: Brett Banks
- Music by: Matt Hauser
- Production companies: Fine Point Films; PolyGram Entertainment
- Distributed by: Showtime
- Release dates: January 24, 2020 (Sundance); June 30, 2020 (Showtime)
- Running time: 97 minutes
- Countries: United States; Ireland; Canada
- Language: English

The Go-Go's is a 2020 American-Irish-Canadian documentary film directed and produced by Alison Ellwood. The film follows the rise of the girl band the Go-Go's.

The film premiered at the 2020 Sundance Film Festival on January 24, 2020, followed by its release in the United States on June 30, 2020, by Showtime. It has a 98 minute runtime. On March 16, 2024 it premiered on The CW making it the first non pay television network to air the film.

== Synopsis ==
The Go-Go's become the first successful, all-girl band to write their own songs and play their own instruments while making it to No. 1 on the charts. The Go-Go's follows the rise of a band starting from the LA punk scene.

== Interviewees ==
- Charlotte Caffey, lead guitar, keyboardist
- Belinda Carlisle, lead vocalist
- Gina Schock, drummer
- Kathy Valentine, bassist, rhythm guitar
- Jane Wiedlin, rhythm guitar
- Margot Olavarria, former bassist with the Go-Go's
- Elissa Bello, former drummer with the Go-Go's
- Paula Jean Brown, former bassist with the Go-Go's
- Ginger Canzoneri, former manager of the Go-Go's
- Kathleen Hanna of Bikini Kill
- Pleasant Gehman, writer and musician
- Lynval Golding of the Specials
- Lee Thompson of Madness
- Stewart Copeland of the Police
- Chris Connelly, journalist
- Martha Quinn, former MTV video jockey
- Miles Copeland III, music executive with I.R.S. Records
- Dave Robinson, music executive with Stiff Records

== Critical reception ==
The review consensus at Rotten Tomatoes for The Go-Go's had 98% of critics recommending the film, based on 45 reviews and an average rating of 7.9/10. The website's critics consensus reads: "Emulating the spirit of punk in form and function, The Go-Go's is a raucous celebration of the pioneering band and a stylistic knockout that will blow viewers' hair back." Metacritic, which uses a weighted average, assigned the film a score of 81 out of 100, based on 15 critics, indicating "universal acclaim".

Reviewers praised the film, noting it would appeal to fans and non-fans alike. Reviews noted the candor that the members of the band bring to their contemporary interviews.

=== Accolades ===
Year	Award	Category	Nominee	Result	Ref.
2020	Critics' Choice Documentary Awards	Best Music Documentary	The Go-Go's	Won	
2020	Critics' Choice Documentary Awards	Most Compelling Living Subject of a Documentary	The Go-Go's	Won	
2020	Critics' Choice Documentary Awards	Best Documentary	The Go-Go's	Nominated	
2021	Focal International Awards	Best Use of Footage in a Music Production	Alison Ellwood	Nominated	
