= We Got the Beat =

1982 single by the Go-Go's

- 1982 US vinyl reissue

Single by the Go-Go's

from the album Beauty and the Beat
- B-side: "How Much More"
- Released: May 9, 1980
- Recorded: 1980
- Genre: New wave; rock and roll
- Length: 2:13 (original version); 2:40 (re-recorded version)
- Label: Stiff (1980), I.R.S. (1981–1982), A&M (1982)
- Songwriter: Charlotte Caffey
- Producers: Paul L. Wexler (original version); Richard Gottehrer, Rob Freeman (re-recorded version)

The Go-Go's singles chronology
"We Got the Beat" (1980)	"Our Lips Are Sealed" (1981)

Music video
- "We Got the Beat" on YouTube

"We Got the Beat" is the debut single by the American all-female rock band the Go-Go's, written by the group's lead guitarist and keyboardist Charlotte Caffey. The band first recorded the song in early 1980 as a single on UK-based Stiff Records, and re-recorded it the next year for their debut album Beauty and the Beat on I.R.S. Records. "We Got the Beat" is considered a new wave classic and the Go-Go's' signature song. The song was named one of "The Rock and Roll Hall of Fame's 500 Songs that Shaped Rock and Roll".

The first version of the song was released as a single on May 9, 1980, in the UK, but it was criticized for being artificially sped up. Even so, the song brought the Go-Go's underground credibility during their first UK tour and increased their visibility in the US. This first version reached number 35 on the U.S. Hot Dance Club Play chart due to its popularity in clubs as an import.

Invigorated by new members Gina Schock and Kathy Valentine on drums and bass, the band signed to I.R.S. Records in April 1981 and remade the song in New York City. This new version, driven by Schock's drumming, and recorded at a slower pace as directed by producer Richard Gottehrer, first appeared as an album track on Beauty and the Beat on July 8, 1981. Following the lead single "Our Lips Are Sealed", "We Got the Beat" was prepped to be the second single from the album. Both songs were performed by the band in November on Saturday Night Live. "We Got the Beat" entered the Billboard pop chart in February 1982, and a month later it peaked at number 2. It was also a top 10 hit in Canada.

The song was also used during the opening sequence in the 1982 movie Fast Times at Ridgemont High.

== Background, composition and release ==
"We Got the Beat" evolved in part out of the Go-Go's covering the Smokey Robinson song that served as the group's namesake: The Miracles' "Going to a Go-Go" (1965). Taking inspiration from that, and from the opening theme of The Twilight Zone, lead guitarist Charlotte Caffey wrote "We Got the Beat" and offered it to the band with hesitation, afraid that it would not be punk enough for the other members' tastes. When the rest of the Go-Go's heard the song, they loved it – and its incorporation into their set marked a stylistic change for the group as they moved away from punk rock and toward a more pop sensibility that would align the Go-Go's with the music that was being termed "new wave".

Go-Go's manager Ginger Canzoneri secured a deal with British indie label Stiff Records to release the original version of "We Got the Beat" as a single, in support of the band's 1980 UK tour with Madness and the Specials. In the 2020 documentary The Go-Go's, Canzoneri recalled that Stiff Records had also wanted to secure publishing rights for "We Got the Beat" and its B-side, "How Much More" (both produced by Paul L. Wexler), but she declined, thinking it was important for the band to hold the publishing rights to their own songs.

After the tumultuous UK tour, the Go-Go's returned home to Los Angeles and packed clubs when they performed, due to the single's popularity – leading them to finally sign a deal with newly established I.R.S. Records. The band headed to New York City to record their debut album at Pennylane Studio, where producer Richard Gottehrer advised the group to slow their songs down. "We Got the Beat" remained an exception to this advice, though the band lengthened it slightly by adding a few bars to the song's instrumental intro.

"We Got the Beat" led off the second side of the Go-Go's debut album, Beauty and the Beat, released in July 1981. It served as the album's second single in January 1982, now with another album track, "Can't Stop the World", on its B-side. Clocking in at 2 1/2 minutes, the second studio version of the song is recognizable by its drumming intro. The song's lyrics mention various early 1960s dances such as the Pony, the Watusi, and Go-Go dancing.

The song was later included in the jukebox musical Head over Heels that debuted on Broadway in 2018.

The Go-Go's performed the song, along with "Vacation" and "Our Lips Are Sealed", during the 2021 Rock and Roll Hall of Fame Induction Ceremony.

== Reception ==
Cash Box said "The Grammy Awards-nominated Go-Go's continue on their winning ways with this new recording of the cut that started it all for the girls in 1980 as an English single on Stiff; punchy, to-the-point power-pop." Billboard called it a "catchy rocker" that has "the same endearing charm" as "Our Lips Are Sealed."

== Chart performance ==
"We Got the Beat" became the Go-Go's biggest hit, spending three weeks at number 2 on the U.S. Billboard Hot 100. It was during the song's time in the U.S. top 10 that Beauty and the Beat topped the U.S. Billboard 200.

=== Weekly charts ===
Chart (1981–1982)	Peak position
US Dance Club Songs (Billboard)	35
Australia (Kent Music Report)	29
Canada Top Singles (RPM)	3
US (Billboard Hot 100)	2
US Mainstream Rock Airplay (Billboard)	7

=== Year-end charts ===
Year-end chart (1982)	Rank
Canada Top Singles (RPM)	32
US Top Pop Singles (Billboard)	25

== Certifications ==
Region	Certification	Certified units/sales
Canada (Music Canada)	Gold	50,000^{^}
United States (RIAA)	Gold	1,000,000^{^}
^{^} Shipments figures based on certification alone.

== Track listing ==
UK 7-inch single (1980, Stiff Records)

1. "We Got the Beat" (Caffey)
2. "How Much More" (Caffey/Wiedlin)

UK 7-inch single (1981, I.R.S. Records)

1. "We Got the Beat" (Caffey)
2. "Skidmarks on My Heart" (Caffey/Carlisle)

US 7-inch single (1981, I.R.S. Records)

1. "We Got the Beat" (Caffey) - 2:30
2. "Can't Stop the World" (Valentine) - 3:22

== Debby Ryan version ==
A cover of "We Got the Beat" was recorded in 2012 by American singer-songwriter Debby Ryan from the soundtrack of the movie Radio Rebel. It was produced by Matthew Gerrard, Ali Dee Theodore and Matthew Tishler.

A music video was released on Disney Channel on February 13, 2012. The video was directed by Ryan and choreographed by Alyson Stoner.
