= Vacation (The Go-Go's album) =

1982 studio album by the Go-Go's

Studio album by the Go-Go's
- Released: July 20, 1982
- Recorded: March–May 1982
- Studios: Studio 55 and Sunset Sound Recorders (Hollywood, California); Indigo Ranch (Malibu, California)
- Genres: Pop rock; new wave; power pop
- Length: 35:41
- Label: I.R.S.
- Producer: Richard Gottehrer

The Go-Go's chronology
Beauty and the Beat (1981)	Vacation (1982)	Talk Show (1984)

Singles from Vacation
- 1. "Vacation" / "Beatnik Beach" Released: June 1982; 2. "Get Up and Go" / "Speeding" Released: September 1982; 3. "This Old Feeling" / "It's Everything but Partytime" Released: December 1982 (US only)

Vacation is the second studio album by American rock band the Go-Go's, released on July 20, 1982, by I.R.S. Records. The album reached number eight on the Billboard 200, and has been certified gold by the Recording Industry Association of America (RIAA).

Despite the album's success, the recording period was hampered by several issues. Most of the band's lineup was struggling with drug addiction and they were starting to argue more over creative differences. There was also growing discord between songwriter and lead guitarist Charlotte Caffey, lead singer Belinda Carlisle, and guitarist Jane Wiedlin, who had begun to take more of an interest in songwriting. These problems continued to escalate and would eventually result in the band's dissolution following the disappointing sales of their third album, Talk Show.

== Release ==
Vacation was released on July 20, 1982 by I.R.S. Records, peaking at number eight on the Billboard 200 chart in the United States. The title track served as the album's lead single and reached number eight on the Billboard Hot 100. Notably, it was also issued as the first cassette single released in the US. In addition to the title track, two more singles were pulled from the album at the time: "Get Up and Go" and "This Old Feeling", the former of which peaked at number 50 on the Billboard Hot 100. The song "Speeding", which is not included on the album, is a Caffey/Wiedlin composition used as B-side of the single for "Get Up and Go".

In 2016, Edsel Records reissued remastered deluxe editions, all with bonus tracks, of the first three Go-Go's albums.

== Critical reception ==
Professional ratings
Review scores
Source	Rating
AllMusic	3/5 stars
Record Collector	3/5 stars
Record Mirror	2.5/5 stars
Rolling Stone	4/5 stars
The Village Voice	B−

Rolling Stone critic Ken Tucker praised Vacation as a significant musical progression for the Go-Go's, observing "a fresh curiosity about the world and a treasure trove of precise details", as well as "first-rate songwriting that offers Carlisle a wide range of emotions and characters." He highlighted "This Old Feeling" as "a perfect pop song ... Rarely has the woozy pleasure of a good daydream been rendered more movingly in rock music." In a more critical review for The Village Voice, Robert Christgau noted "the uniform thinness of the non-Kathy Valentine songs".

Cash Box called "Get Up and Go" a "rousing pop/rocker", saying that "the rhythm is as peppy as the title would indicate." Billboard called it a "spirited pop/rock anthem" that is "invigorating" despite not being as "seamless" or having as much "mass appeal" as the preceding hit single "Vacation". Detroit Free Press critic Gary Graff called it a "beach party pop tune."

== Track listing ==
Side one
No.	Title	Lyrics	Music	Length
1.	"Vacation"	Kathy Valentine; Charlotte Caffey; Jane Wiedlin	Valentine; Caffey	2:57
2.	"He's So Strange"	Wiedlin	Caffey; Leonard Phillips; Glen Custis	2:55
3.	"Girl of 100 Lists"	Wiedlin	Wiedlin	2:16
4.	"We Don't Get Along"	Valentine	Valentine	2:42
5.	"I Think It's Me"	Belinda Carlisle; Caffey	Caffey	2:40
6.	"It's Everything but Partytime"	Wiedlin	Wiedlin; Gina Schock	3:18

Side two
No.	Title	Lyrics	Music	Length
7.	"Get Up and Go"	Wiedlin; Caffey	Caffey	3:15
8.	"This Old Feeling"	Wiedlin	Caffey	3:04
9.	"Cool Jerk" (The Capitols cover)	Donald Storball	Storball	2:52
10.	"The Way You Dance"	Wiedlin; Valentine	Caffey	2:54
11.	"Beatnik Beach"	Caffey; Carlisle	Caffey	2:50
12.	"Worlds Away"	Wiedlin; Valentine	Wiedlin; Valentine	3:58

== Personnel ==
Credits are adapted from the album's liner notes.

=== The Go-Go's ===
- Charlotte Caffey – lead guitar, keyboards, back-up vocals
- Belinda Carlisle – lead vocals
- Gina Schock – drums, percussion, back-up vocals
- Kathy Valentine – bass guitar, back-up vocals
- Jane Wiedlin – rhythm guitar, back-up vocals

=== Additional musicians ===
- Steve Berlin – saxophone on "This Old Feeling"

=== Technical ===
- Richard Gottehrer – production
- Thom Panunzio – recording, mixing (Note: Mixed at the Record Plant (New York City) and Indigo Ranch (Malibu, California))
- James Ball, Stuart Furusho, David Leonard, Neil Pedinoff – recording assistance
- Greg Calbi – mastering (Note: Mastered at Sterling Sound (New York City))

=== Artwork ===
- Mick Haggerty – art direction, design, photography
- Ginger Canzoneri – art direction

== Charts ==
Chart performance for Vacation
Chart (1982)	Peak position
Australian Albums (Kent Music Report)	71
Canada Top Albums/CDs (RPM)	24
Dutch Albums (Album Top 100)	44
Swedish Albums (Sverigetopplistan)	24
UK Albums (Official Charts)	75
US Billboard 200	8

== Certifications ==
Certifications for Vacation
Region	Certification	Certified units/sales
United States (RIAA)	Gold	500,000^{^}
^{^} Shipments figures based on certification alone.
