= Head over Heels (Go-Go's song) =

- Standard picture sleeve

Single by The Go-Go's

from the album Talk Show
- B-side: "Good for Gone"
- Released: February 21, 1984
- Recorded: 1983
- Genre: Pop rock, new wave
- Length: 3:37
- Label: I.R.S.
- Songwriter(s): Charlotte Caffey, Kathy Valentine
- Producer(s): Martin Rushent

The Go-Go's singles chronology
"He's So Strange" (1982)	"Head over Heels" (1984)	"Turn to You" (1984)

"Head over Heels" is a song by the pop rock/new wave band the Go-Go's, released in 1984 as the first single from their third studio album, Talk Show. The song was written by band members Charlotte Caffey and Kathy Valentine, and produced by English record producer Martin Rushent. The Go-Gos' rhythm guitarist Jane Wiedlin has cited "Head over Heels" as her favorite Go-Go's song, describing it as "just a classic. Like a little pop truffle of chocolate that's just completely delicious."

The 2018 Broadway jukebox musical Head over Heels that used the Go-Go's music took its title from the track and included the song as the opening number in Act Two of the show.

== Reception ==
The song was the most successful of the album's three singles, peaking at number 11 on the US Billboard Hot 100. It also spent three weeks at number 10 on the US Cash Box Top 100.

Cash Box said that the song demonstrates that the group has lost none of their vitality and energy and that "Belinda Carlisle's voice seems to have taken on a deeper, richer resonance that marks the bands maturation as recording artists."

== Music video ==
A music video was produced for the song, in which Go-Go's members can be seen playing instruments as well as Jane Wiedlin reading a book and a Usair Boeing 727 jet taxiing on the background, among other elements.

== Chart performance ==
=== Weekly charts ===
Chart (1984)	Peak position
Canadian Singles Chart	35
US Billboard Hot 100	11
US Cash Box Top 100	10

=== Year-end charts ===
Chart (1984)	Rank
US Billboard Hot 100	88
