= Vacation (The Go-Go's song) =

1982 single by the Go-Go's

- Standard picture sleeve

Single by the Go-Go's

from the album Vacation
- B-side: "Beatnik Beach"
- Released: July 20, 1982
- Recorded: 1982
- Studio: Studio 55 (Hollywood, CA); Sunset Sound Recorders (Los Angeles, CA); Indigo Ranch (Malibu, CA)
- Genre: Power pop
- Length: 2:59
- Label: I.R.S.
- Songwriters: Charlotte Caffey; Kathy Valentine; Jane Wiedlin
- Producer: Richard Gottehrer

The Go-Go's singles chronology
"Automatic" (1982)	"Vacation" (1982)	"Get Up and Go" (1982)

"Vacation" is a 1982 single released by the all-female rock band, the Go-Go's. The song was the first single from the album Vacation.

The song became one of the Go-Go's highest-charting singles, reaching No. 8 on the Billboard Hot 100 in August 1982, being the band's second and final US top-10 hit. The song was released on 7" vinyl format, with the surf rock song "Beatnik Beach" as the single's B-side. "Vacation" carries the distinction of being the first known cassette single released in the United States or "cassingle" as trademarked by I.R.S. Records.

Billboard called it a "perfect summer record" saying it is "uptempo, optimistic and the aural companion for lazy days at the beach." Cash Box called it "propulsive power pop."

An earlier version of "Vacation", written solely by Kathy Valentine, was released by The Textones, of which Valentine was a member, in 1980. It was released on Chiswick Records in the United Kingdom as an EP and later a 45.

== Music video ==
The video, which was directed by Mick Haggerty and C.D. Taylor, starts by showing the song's title on a photo in a travel brochure. It depicts the band waiting on a pile of luggage at an airport after Belinda Carlisle arrives in a taxi. It changes to show them performing, then ends with a section in which they water-ski in formation, as on the album cover. All the band members smile and mug for the camera in individual closeups. The photo then freezes and zooms out to be shown in another travel brochure on the floor, which an unseen janitor sweeps up, with other trash (most likely from the airport portion of the video).

It was shot in one day on a $50,000 budget, large for the time, and the band was coming off a debut album that had reached number one. "We still saw videos as an annoying waste of time," recalls Jane Wiedlin. "After seven or eight hours we sent out someone to sneak in booze." Kathy Valentine says they drank "lots of champagne." Wiedlin says the effects are evident during the closeups of the women at the end: "if you look at our eyes, we're all so drunk. We didn't even try to make it look like we were really waterskiing."

== Track listing ==
7-inch and cassette single

A. "Vacation" – 2:59 (2:55 on cassette)
B. "Beatnik Beach" – 2:52 (2:45 on cassette)

== In popular culture ==
The song was later included in the jukebox musical Head over Heels that debuted on Broadway in 2018.

The Go-Go's performed "Vacation", "Our Lips Are Sealed", and "We Got the Beat" during the 2021 Rock and Roll Hall of Fame Induction Ceremony.

"Vacation" was used in two Klasky-Csupo animated series; Duckman in the episode “In The Nam of the Father”, and Rugrats in the episode “Vacation”. The song was played in The Simpsons season 16 episode "Mobile Homer". The song was also used in the trailer for the 2007 comedy film, Mr. Bean's Holiday.

The song was played during the end credits of the 2019 Marvel Studios movie, Spider-Man: Far From Home.

A parody of the song was sung several times during the Brooklyn Nine-Nine Season 6 episode "Casecation".

The song was played in a scene of the documentary Fahrenheit 9/11 by Michael Moore.

The song is played over a montage towards the end of It's Always Sunny in Philadelphia season 7 episode 2, The Gang goes to the Jersey Shore.

In 2022 American drag queen Trixie Mattel covered the song for her album The Blonde & Pink Albums.

The song was used the verse of the song for the opening English dub "We Will Be Heroes" for the anime eleventh season of Pokémon.

== Charts ==
=== Weekly charts ===
Chart (1982)	Peak position
Australia (Kent Music Report)	43
Canada Top Singles (RPM)	23
Netherlands (Single Top 100)	31
Sweden (Sverigetopplistan)	18
US Billboard Hot 100	8
US Dance Club Songs (Billboard)	17
US Mainstream Rock (Billboard)	13
US Cash Box Top 100	6

=== Year-end charts ===
Chart (1982)	Position
American Top 40 Year-End	76
US Billboard Hot 100	87
US Cash Box	39
