= Ginger Canzoneri =

American band manager

- Occupation: Band manager
- Years active: 1978-present
- Known for: Original manager of The Go-Go's

Ginger Canzoneri is an American band manager. She was the original manager of 1980s power pop and female punk rock group The Go-Go's, starting in 1979. Canzoneri joined the band after its formation in 1978, and she pawned her jewelry and secured a loan on her car to fund the band's UK tour opening for The Specials and Madness in the summer of 1980. She helped the Go-Go's sign their first major label record deal. She was associated with the women in the punk rock movement. She went on to manage other bands.

Canzoneri notably called Rolling Stone co-founder Jann Wenner on behalf of the band to complain about what they felt was a sexist depiction of them on one of the magazine's covers. She is featured prominently in a documentary about the band, The Go-Go's (2020), which mentions that she felt pushed aside when the band became more successful.

Once the band left Ginger's management, they acquired a corporate management team, including an accountant and lawyer. Ginger, like the members of the band, was female and promoted it as an all-girl group, but the management run by Irving Azoff that succeeded her was all-male. Canzeroni was beaten with a nightstick by the LAPD at the so-called Elks Lodge massacre or police riot, or the St. Patrick's Day massacre, March 17, 1978, at what is today the Park Plaza Hotel. She lived in Alphabet City.

Ginger and the Go-Go's members were sued for wrongful termination by Margot Olavarria, the band's original bassist, and the suit was settled in 1984.
