= Beyond Music =

American record label group

- Industry: Music
- Genre: Various
- Founded: 1997
- Founder: Allen Kovac
- Defunct: December 2002
- Fate: Liquidated
- Headquarters: Los Angeles, California, U.S.
- Number of locations: (United States)
- Area served: Worldwide; United States
- Products: Music and entertainment
- Owner: Left Bank Management; Unidisc (back catalogue)
- Divisions: Beyond Records; Americoma Records; Coolio's Crowbar Records; Indivision; Mötley Records; Slimstyle Records
- Website: beyondmusic.com (Archived on October 17, 2000)

Beyond Music was an American record label group based in Los Angeles, California. It was founded in 1997 by Allen Kovac. The label group operated as an arm of Kovac's Left Bank Management firm (founded in 1983), which he jointly ran with Jeffrey Sydney. The label was known for its strategy of "resurrecting" bands and artists that had decreased in popularity with unusual high-profile marketing campaigns, and its roster included Yes, Blondie, Veruca Salt, Mötley Crüe, Vince Neil, and others. It also signed a variety of new bands and artists, such as Lucy Pearl and 58.

== History ==
On August 1, 1998, Billboard magazine announced the formation of Beyond Music via an exclusive feature in the magazine, and unveiled a list of artists who had signed to the label. BMG signed a pressing-and-distribution (P&D) agreement with Beyond Music to distribute the label group's release internationally; outside of the United States, some of Beyond Music's releases were licensed to and distributed by a variety of labels, such as EMI Records for Canada and Sony Music Entertainment (SME) for Europe. Universal Music and Video Distribution took over Beyond Music's distribution from BMG in May 2001; the label's first release under the new distribution deal was God Bless The Go-Go's by The Go-Go's, which was released on May 15, 2001.

The label, along with Left Bank Management, went into liquidation towards the end of 2002 following a dispute between Kovac and Sydney, resulting in more than a dozen employees being laid off. Kovac later filed an arbitration lawsuit against Sydney on December 31, 2002, alleging that he had defrauded and manipulated him, and formed a new management company, Kovac Media Group, in January 2003. Eleven Seven Music, which Kovac formed in 2006, is seen as a successor to Beyond Music. Several of Beyond's artists were transferred to Unidisc, including Better Than Ezra, Chronic Future, Face to Face, Lucy Pearl, Sponge and Veruca Salt. Several former artists on Beyond, such as Better than Ezra, have since reclaimed the rights to their releases on the label.

== Notable artists ==
This is a list of well-known artists who have recorded for Beyond Music and its associated labels.

- 58 (Americoma)
- The Alarm MM++
- Better Than Ezra
- Blondie
- Chronic Future
- Face to Face
- The Fixx
- The Go-Go's
- Sammy Hagar
- Lucy Pearl
- Meat Loaf
- Mötley Crüe (Mötley)
- Prymary Colorz
- Jill Sobule
- Sponge
- Veruca Salt
- Violent Femmes
- Yes
