= Talk Show (The Go-Go's album) =

Studio album by the Go-Go's
- Released: March 19, 1984
- Recorded: November 1983 – January 1984
- Studio: Genetic, England
- Genre: Pop rock; new wave
- Length: 37:08
- Label: I.R.S.
- Producer: Martin Rushent

The Go-Go's chronology
Vacation (1982)	Talk Show (1984)	Greatest (1990)

Singles from Talk Show
- 1. "Head over Heels" / "Good for Gone" Released: March 1984; 2. "Turn to You" / "I'm with You" Released: June 1984; 3. "Yes or No" / "Mercenary" Released: September 1984

Talk Show is the third studio album by American rock band the Go-Go's, released on March 19, 1984 by I.R.S. Records.

== Background ==
Talk Show was recorded from November 1983 to January 1984 at Genetic Studios in England, under the guidance of English record producer and Genetic co-founder Martin Rushent. Conflict among the members of the Go-Go's during the album's recording fractured the band, culminating in their eventual disbandment after the album's release and supporting tour.

Jane Wiedlin confirmed in the 2020 documentary The Go-Go's that the recording of the song "Forget That Day" – a song she wrote – contributed to her leaving the band. Wiedlin had wanted to be the main vocalist on the track, which was very personal to her, only to be blocked from doing so by the rest of the band. "One of them said, 'What makes you think you're good enough to sing the song?'", Wiedlin recalled. Another point of contention was royalties; Wiedlin wrote most of the album and so expected to receive a larger share of the profits. However, a decision was made that the royalties would be divided evenly among the band, even to members who had not contributed much to the album's writing. "And then I said, 'F–k you, I quit,'" she stated in the documentary.

== Release ==
Talk Show was released on March 19, 1984 by I.R.S. Records. Peaking at number 18 on the US Billboard 200, it was a relative commercial disappointment, selling less than 500,000 copies. The album's lead single "Head over Heels" reached number 11 on the Billboard Hot 100, while second and third singles "Turn to You" and "Yes or No" reached numbers 32 and 84, respectively.

The music video for "Head over Heels" was directed by Douglas Brian Martin. The music video for "Turn to You" featured a starring role for rising-star actor Rob Lowe; the song was written about baseball pitcher Bob Welch, a one-time boyfriend of Charlotte Caffey. The video director, Mary Lambert, went on to work on several other videos, including hits by Madonna, and on films, such as Pet Sematary. The music video for "Yes or No" was released shortly before the group's breakup was announced, possibly hurting the song's sales and chart performance.

The Go-Go's broke up shortly after completing their "Prime Time" tour to fulfill contractual obligations, leaving Talk Show as the last all-original album by the group until 2001's God Bless the Go-Go's. Many of the songs on Talk Show have not been performed by the Go-Go's in concert in any of the band's reunions since the early 1990s. Only "Head over Heels" went on to consistently be a staple of the band's live shows and Belinda Carlisle's solo performances.

The flip side of "Head over Heels", "Good for Gone", did not appear on the initial album release, but was included on some CD releases of Talk Show, as well as the band's 1994 compilation album Return to the Valley of the Go-Go's.

In 2016, Edsel Records reissued remastered deluxe editions, all with bonus tracks, of the first three Go-Go's albums.

== Critical reception ==
Professional ratings
Review scores
Source	Rating
AllMusic	3/5 stars
The Philadelphia Inquirer	5/5 stars
Record Collector	2/5 stars
Rolling Stone	4/5 stars
The Village Voice	A−

Writing for The Philadelphia Inquirer, critic Ken Tucker opined that with Talk Show, the Go-Go's had progressed "far beyond the cute-girl-group label that it has endured for too long. Making the most of Martin Rushent's sharp, percussive production style, the band has streamlined its style to perform a series of terse, drily clever songs." He later placed it on his list of 1984's top 10 rock albums. The Village Voice's Robert Christgau found the album "thrilling", saying that "its expressive enthusiasm gives me the same good feeling I used to get from their musical godmothers in Fanny—a sense of possibility that might touch women who are turned off by more explicit politics, and that these women are strong enough to put into practice." Laura Fissinger of Musician felt that the album possessed "an inner voice of sadness and anger that we might not have expected" from the band, adding, "It stumbles under that emotional weight as often as it runs, but no bones get broken ... Into the narrow spaces of party rock the Go-Go's are pushing metaphors, similes, turns of phrase; the tensions of the tight fit could force the band toward extraordinary work."

Some critics considered Talk Show an inspired return to form for the Go-Go's after their second album Vacation. "Fizzy and feisty," wrote Christopher Connelly in Rolling Stone, "the bracingly fresh sound of Talk Show explodes like a just uncorked bottle of cold champagne. Faced with the most critical album of their career – an LP that will determine whether the band will be taken as a serious outfit or merely as a cute but talent-poor pentad of ponytail rockers – the Go-Go's have shrugged off the commercial pressure to rehash their earlier successes and have delivered instead a bold, unselfconscious LP of out-and-out rock & roll ... If nothing else, Talk Show proves that music is what really matters to this band. And their enthusiastic commitment to that music might be Talk Show's finest selling point."

In a retrospective review, Stephen Thomas Erlewine of AllMusic stated, "For their third album, the Go-Go's abandoned all pretense of being punk, or even new wave, and went for an unabashed mainstream pop masterpiece. They nearly achieved their goal with Talk Show, an album filled with great pop songs but undermined by its own ambition ... when the production and song are teamed well, the results are incredible ... Unfortunately, those moments don't arrive frequently enough to make Talk Show the new wave classic that it wants to be."

== Track listing ==
Side one
No.	Title	Writer(s)	Length
1.	"Head over Heels"	Charlotte Caffey, Kathy Valentine	3:38
2.	"Turn to You"	Caffey, Jane Wiedlin	3:48
3.	"You Thought"	Gina Schock, Valentine	4:12
4.	"Beneath the Blue Sky"	Valentine, Wiedlin	3:00
5.	"Forget That Day"	Wiedlin	4:25

Side two
No.	Title	Writer(s)	Length
6.	"I'm the Only One"	Valentine, Danny B. Harvey, Carlene Carter	3:29
7.	"Yes or No"	Wiedlin, Ron Mael, Russell Mael	4:04
8.	"Capture the Light"	Wiedlin	3:15
9.	"I'm with You"	Schock, Wiedlin	3:37
10.	"Mercenary"	Wiedlin, Valentine, Caffey	3:40

CD edition bonus track
No.	Title	Writer(s)	Length
11.	"Good for Gone"	Schock, Valentine	2:54

== Personnel ==
Credits are adapted from the album's liner notes.

Band members

- Charlotte Caffey – lead guitar, keyboards, backing vocals
- Belinda Carlisle – lead vocals
- Gina Schock – drums
- Kathy Valentine – bass guitar, lead guitar, backing vocals
- Jane Wiedlin – rhythm guitar, backing vocals

Production

- Martin Rushent – production, engineering
- Dave Allen, Philip Tennant, Jim Russell – assistant engineering
- Nathan Lam – vocal direction

Design

- Douglas Brian Martin – art direction
- Chris Craymer – photography

== Charts ==
Album

Year	Chart	Position
1984	Billboard 200 (USA)	18
1984	RPM 100 Albums (Canada)	64

Singles

Year	Song	U.S. Hot 100	CAN Singles
1984	"Head over Heels"	11	35
1984	"Turn to You"	32	95
1984	"Yes or No"	84	—
