= Kathy Valentine =

American guitarist and bassist (born 1959)

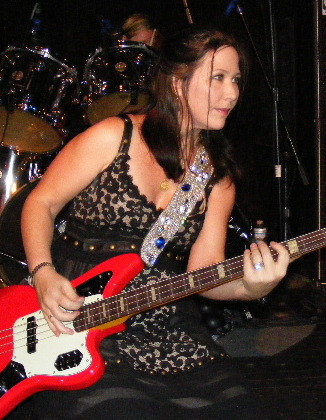
- Valentine performing in 2008

Background information
- Born: Kathryn Valentine; January 7, 1959 (age 67); Austin, Texas, U.S.
- Genres: Pop rock; blues rock; pop punk; new wave; power pop
- Occupations: Musician; songwriter; memoirist
- Instruments: Bass; guitar
- Years active: 1978–present
- Website: kathyvalentine.com

Kathryn Valentine (born January 7, 1959) is an American musician who is the bassist for the rock band the Go-Go's. She has maintained a career in music through songwriting, recording, performing and touring as well as additional academic and creative pursuits. Valentine was inducted into the Rock and Roll Hall of Fame in October 2021 as a member of The Go-Go's.

== Early life ==
Valentine was born on January 7, 1959, in Austin, Texas, an only child who was raised by her single mother, an English expatriate. In 9th grade she began playing guitar after she moved from public school to an alternative school called Greenbriar. In 1973, while visiting England with her mother, she happened to see Suzi Quatro on Top Of The Pops, and said it "blew her mind". It had never occurred to her that a woman could be a rock star.

She returned to Austin, got an electric guitar and amplifier, and began looking for bandmates. She credits the Austin music scene for her diverse musical roots, in particular Jimmie Vaughan and The Fabulous Thunderbirds, as well as Texas icon Doug Sahm who let her onstage to sit in with his band on the Chuck Berry song "Carol".

In 1975, on a subsequent family visit to London with her mother, she answered an advertisement in Melody Maker and joined the fledgling Girlschool. She missed a gig due to illness and was replaced by Kelly Johnson, with whom she would later work. Inspired by the punk scene and bands like the Ramones and Blondie, Valentine returned to Austin and formed the punk band the Violators, alongside Carla Olson, Jesse Sublett and Marilyn Dean. The band played at Raul's, Austin's first punk club, in February 1978.

In late 1978, aged 19, Valentine moved to Los Angeles and co-founded the Textones with Carla Olson. The Textones released two singles, including an unreleased Tom Petty song, before Valentine left the band in 1980. During her time in the Textones, Phil Seymour recorded "We Don't Get Along", a song she had written. The Go-Go's would later record this song as well as other songs she had written during the Textones period, such as "Vacation" and "Can't Stop The World".

== Career ==
=== The Go-Go's (1980–1985) ===
Valentine was asked to play bass, an instrument that she had not played extensively, as a substitute for the Go-Go's bass player Margot Olavarria, who had been ill and the band decided needed to be replaced. She says she learned their songs over four days and rehearsed with them twice before hitting the stage on New Year's Eve 1980 at Whisky a Go Go. Valentine was asked to remain as a permanent member shortly thereafter. The Go-Go's were signed to I.R.S. Records in March 1981. "Can't Stop the World" was recorded for the Go-Go's debut album, Beauty and the Beat.

The second album featured Valentine's previous Textones song "Vacation" as the title track and first single, after re-working the arrangement with Go-Gos' guitarist Charlotte Caffey. On the Go-Gos' third LP, Talk Show, Valentine also co-wrote with Caffey the hit single "Head over Heels," and played lead guitar on several songs, including the single "Turn To You", album cuts "You Thought", "Beneath The Blue Sky", and "Good For Gone".

The band struggled with internal difficulties during the recording of Talk Show, and tried to stay together after the departure of rhythm guitarist Jane Wiedlin. Valentine moved to rhythm guitar duties, and Paula Jean Brown was hired to play bass. The Go-Go's broke up in May 1985.

=== Post Go-Go's (1985–1990) and Go-Go's reunion ===
After the break up, Valentine said that she felt lost and that her identity had become absorbed into being a Go-Go. Returning to her rock roots, she formed the World's Cutest Killers, a line up she thought would be successful, featuring former Girlschool guitarist Kelly Johnson, her old friend Jesse Sublett on bass, drummer (future A&R man) Craig Aaronson, and keyboardist Jebin Bruni. The group attracted the attention of producer Mike Chapman and recorded demos, which were scrapped, and the band split up. Several other bands and line ups went nowhere, and Valentine returned to school. In 1990, the Go-Go's reunited for concerts and a CD of greatest hits, but split again soon after.

=== The BlueBonnets, The Delphines, and Go-Go's second reunion (1992–2013) ===
In 1992, Valentine began her longest collaboration and partnership with singer and bassist Dominique Davalos. They formed the BlueBonnets, a blues-based group. With high-profile guests sitting in with the band, club goers lining up to see them, and performances at celebrity wedding receptions and parties, record company scouts took notice but the band went through line up changes — many fans thought the addition of Pinky Turzo on lead vocals was the group's pinnacle, although attempts to capture the magic in the studio proved fruitless — and eventually morphed into the Valentine/Davalos band The Delphines early in 1995.

The Go-Go's began working together again, with Valentine co-writing "The Whole World Lost Its Head" on Return to the Valley of The Go-Go's, a song which became the band's highest charting U.K. single. The band released a new CD God Bless The Go-Go's in 2001, toured extensively for many years, and appeared in a popular DVD live concert, The Go-Go's Live In Central Park. Determined not to let the Go-Go's define her this time around, Valentine kept The Delphines going, and the band released two albums, The Delphines (1996) and Cosmic Speed (2001).

=== Light Years (2005) ===
In 2005, Valentine released a solo recording, Light Years, that she co-produced, wrote, arranged and performed the guitar and vocal tracks. Light Years featured musician friends, including Kiss guitarist Ace Frehley, Guns and Roses guitarist Gilby Clarke, Lenny Kravitz, guitarist Craig Ross, and drummers Clem Burke and Pete Thomas. She began the record while pregnant in 2002 and wrote several songs with then husband, attorney and musician Steven Weisburd.

=== Return to Austin, third Go-Go's reunion and Hall of Fame induction (2006-present) ===
In 2006, Valentine returned to her hometown to reside. She has been featured on the cover of the Fall 2010 issue of Texas Music, a February 2007 issue of the Austin Chronicle, and the February 2009 issue of Austin Woman.

In March 2014, at South by Southwest she was inducted into the Austin Music Hall of Fame by members of Blondie (Debbie Harry, Chris Stein, and Clem Burke). She and Davalos re-formed The BlueBonnets with a Texas line up, including Austin guitarist Eve Monsees.

The band has released two albums, Boom Boom Boom Boom (2010) and Play Loud (2014), and were invited to open for The Waterboys American tour in early 2015. Their third album, Tonewrecker, was released on April 1, 2017. Valentine and Davalos also perform in the band Lady Band Johnson, with front man Johnny Goudie.

On March 21, 2016, the Go-Go's announced plans for a farewell tour. However, Valentine was not part of the lineup.

A number of her songs were featured in the 2018 debut of the Broadway musical, Head Over Heels, with a story suggested by Philip Sidney's Arcadia set to the songs of the Go-Go's and Belinda Carlisle. As a result, Valentine rejoined the band to perform their first show together as a quintet in six years at New York's Bowery Ballroom on January 31, 2018. In February 2018, posts on the group's official Facebook page confirmed that Valentine had rejoined the band.

The original version of her Textones song, "Vacation", is the theme song of the Starz cable series Hightown which debuted May 2020, and was renewed for a second season.

In 2020 the group announced an 11-date reunion tour; however the tour was postponed due to the COVID-19 pandemic. In September 2021, The Go-Go's announced plans for a 2022 UK tour with Billy Idol that would start in June 2022.

Valentine and The Go-Go's were inducted into the Rock and Roll Hall of Fame on October 30, 2021. The group celebrated their induction with a special show at the Whisky a Go Go in December 2021. The group however were forced to cancel other West Coast dates scheduled for early January 2022 due to a COVID-19 case involving someone with the tour. Though the band announced their disbandment shortly after the Rock Hall induction, they have reunited several times for events, including an induction to the California Hall of Fame. They reunited for a series of shows in 2025, including joining the bill for the April 2025 Coachella Music Festival and the May 2025 Cruel World concert festival in Pasadena, California.

== Other activities ==
While working to complete her inter-disciplinary degree in English and Fine Arts, Valentine has also begun taking writing jobs and public speaking engagements. She was the keynote speaker at The American Heart Association's Go Red For Women annual event, and for the MEOW Conference, where she also presented a Valor Award to her early inspiration Suzi Quatro.

In 2014, Rainbow Light Nutritional Systems presented Valentine as part of its Game Changers promotional campaign.

In 2013, she put together an all-female, all-star band for the Experience Music Project's Women Who Rock Exhibit.

Valentine recruited underground influential musicians and Seattle-based singers to front the band and was musical director. She has also been hired to write music reviews for The Talkhouse, an online site devoted to music and music lovers. In 2016, Valentine was the featured speaker at Kids In A New Groove annual fundraiser. The same year, Valentine signed with U.T. Press to write a memoir.

The original Textones version of Valentine's song "Vacation" is the theme song of the Starz series Hightown.

Valentine's memoir, All I Ever Wanted, was published by the University of Texas Press in March 2020. The book has received universal praise and was number one on Amazon's Rock Biography chart.

== Go-Go's lawsuit ==
A broken wrist led to Valentine being replaced on a 2012 summer tour. On March 8, 2013, the Go-Go's official website said "irreconcilable differences" had led to her departure. On May 24, 2013, she sued her former bandmates for "breach of fiduciary duty and abuse of control...in an attempt to deprive [her] of her position and interest in the group, including her right to receive her full 20% share of the benefits and revenues generated by the group's substantial reputation, fame, and goodwill." In early 2014, the lawsuit that Valentine brought against her former bandmates was settled out of court. Valentine rejoined the Go-Go's in 2018 and toured with them in summer 2018.

== Personal life ==
Valentine is divorced from Steven Weisburd, with whom she has a daughter. Valentine and Weisburd were partners in The Townsend, a bar and performance venue in downtown Austin from 2016 to 2020.

== Discography ==
=== With the Textones ===
Singles

- 1980: "Some Other Girl" / "Reason To Leave" (I.R.S. / Faulty)
- 1980: "I Can't Fight It" / "Vacation" / "The Time Is Right" (Chiswick)
- 1982: "Vacation" / "The Time Is Right" (Big Beat) - with Kathy Valentine

=== With The Go-Go's ===
- 1981: Beauty and the Beat (I.R.S.)
- 1982: Vacation (I.R.S.)
- 1984: Talk Show (I.R.S.)
- 2001: God Bless The Go-Go's (Beyond Music)

=== With The Delphines ===
- 1997: The Delphines (Spit Fire)
- 2001: Cosmic Speed (Conspiracy Music)

=== Solo albums ===
- 2005: Light Years (All For One)

=== With The BlueBonnets ===
- 2010: Boom Boom Boom Boom (self-released)
- 2014: Play Loud (self-released)
- 2017: Tonewrecker (self-released)

=== As composer ===
- 1980: Phil Seymour - Phil Seymour (Boardwalk Entertainment) - track 8, "We Don't Get Along"
- 1989: Chemical People - Ten Fold Hate (Cruz) - track 14, "Vacation" (co-written with Charlotte Caffey and Jane Wiedlin)
- 1993: Doc Hopper - Aloha (Ringing Ear) - track 8, "Head Over Heels" (co-written with Charlotte Caffey)
- 1998: One Eighty - Crackerjack (BEC) - track 14, "Vacation" (co-written with Charlotte Caffey and Jane Wiedlin)
- 1999: Blondie - No Exit (Beyond) - track 13, "Divine" (co-written with Clem Burke)

=== As producer ===
- 2001: Motorbaby - Rise (Ten Wings)

=== Also appears on ===
- 1993: Carlene Carter - Little Love Letters (Giant) - vocals
- 1994: Carla Olson - Reap the Whirlwind (Watermelon) - guitar
- 2018: The Textones - "Old Stone Gang" - lead guitar on one song

== See also ==
- Music of Austin
