= The Go-Go's =

American rock band (formed 1978)

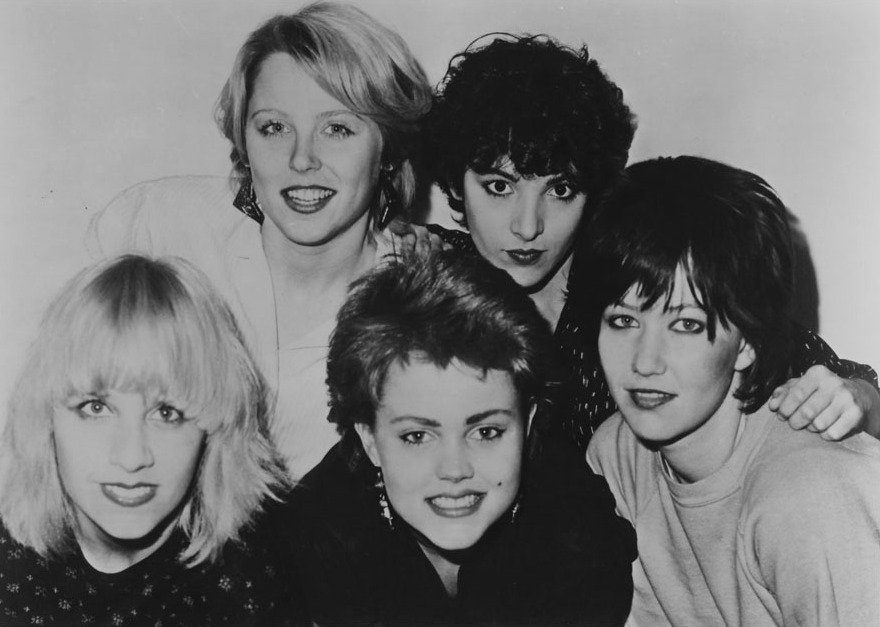
- The Go-Go's, c. 1981

Background information
- Origin: Los Angeles, California, U.S.
- Genres: New wave; pop rock; power pop; punk rock (early)
- Years active: 1978–1985; 1990; 1994; 1999–2022; 2025–present
- Labels: Stiff; Beyond; IRS; A&M
- Members: Belinda Carlisle; Jane Wiedlin; Charlotte Caffey; Gina Schock; Kathy Valentine
- Past members: Margot Olavarria; Elissa Bello; Paula Jean Brown
- Website: gogos.com

The Go-Go's are an American rock band formed in Los Angeles in 1978. Except for short periods when other musicians joined briefly, the band has had a relatively stable lineup consisting of Charlotte Caffey on lead guitar and keyboards, Belinda Carlisle on lead vocals, Gina Schock on drums, Kathy Valentine on bass, and Jane Wiedlin on rhythm guitar.

The quintet emerged from the L.A. punk rock scene of the late 1970s and in 1981 released their debut album Beauty and the Beat. A first for an all-female band writing their material and playing their instruments, the LP topped the Billboard album chart and remains an achievement yet to be matched. Beauty and the Beat is considered one of the "cornerstone albums of US new wave" (AllMusic), having broken barriers and paved the way for a host of other new American acts. It yielded two of the Go-Go's four biggest Hot 100 hits—"Our Lips Are Sealed" (number 20) and "We Got the Beat" (number 2)—and, after a long and steady climb, reached number one in the chart dated March 6, 1982. The album stayed at the top for six consecutive weeks, eventually selling over two million copies. The group, credited as simply Go-Go's on all of their US releases, was nominated for the Best New Artist award at the 24th Annual Grammy Awards.

Two more albums followed: Vacation (1982)—whose title track reached number 8 on Billboard's Hot 100—and Talk Show (1984), which included the hits "Head over Heels" (number 11) and "Turn to You" (number 32). The Go-Go's have sold more than seven million records worldwide.

The Go-Go's broke up in 1985, with each member embarking on a solo career and Carlisle being the most successful, having several Top 10 singles through the late 1980s. They reconvened several times in the 1990s, releasing a new album in 2001, God Bless the Go-Go's, and touring. They received a star on the Hollywood Walk of Fame in 2011. Though the band's 2016 performances were billed as a farewell tour, the band remained active on an ad hoc basis for several years afterward. Head Over Heels, a musical featuring the songs of the Go-Go's, ran on Broadway at the Hudson Theatre from 2018 to 2019. The group was inducted into the Women Songwriters Hall of Fame and the Rock and Roll Hall of Fame in 2021. While the band announced their disbandment shortly after the Rock Hall induction, they have reunited several times for events, including an induction to the California Hall of Fame. They reunited for a series of shows in 2025, including joining the bill for the April 2025 Coachella Music Festival and the May 2025 Cruel World concert festival in Pasadena, California.

== History ==
=== Original incarnation (1978–1980) ===
Formed in Los Angeles in 1978 as the Misfits by Charlotte Caffey (guitar), Belinda Carlisle (vocals), Jane Wiedlin (guitar, background vocals), The Go-Go's also included Margot Olavarria on bass and Elissa Bello on drums.

They were formed as a punk band and had roots in the L.A. punk community. They shared a rehearsal space with the Motels and Carlisle, under the name "Dottie Danger", had briefly been a member of punk rock band the Germs. After Carlisle became temporarily ill, she separated from the Germs before ever playing a gig.

The band began playing gigs at punk venues such as The Masque and the Whisky a Go Go in Los Angeles and the Mabuhay Gardens in San Francisco alongside bands such as X, Fear, the Plugz and the Controllers. Charlotte Caffey (lead guitar, keyboards, background vocals) was added later in 1978, and in the summer of 1979, Gina Schock replaced Bello on drums. With these lineup changes, the group began moving towards their more familiar power pop sound.

The group frequently met at a Denny's on Sunset Boulevard in Hollywood, and it was there they chose the band's name.

In late 1979, the band recorded a five-song demo at Gold Star Studios in Los Angeles, and in 1980, they supported the British ska revival groups Madness and The Specials in both Los Angeles and England. The Go-Go's subsequently spent half of 1980 touring England, earning a sizable following and releasing the demo version of "We Got the Beat" on Stiff Records, which became a minor UK hit.

In December 1980, original bassist Olavarria fell ill and was replaced with Kathy Valentine, who had played guitar in bands such as Girlschool and the Textones. Valentine had not previously played bass guitar. Carlisle also related in her autobiography, Lips Unsealed, that according to the band's view, another reason for Olavarria's dismissal from The Go-Go's was that she frequently missed rehearsals, due largely to her dissatisfaction with the band's move away from punk and toward pop. In late 1982, Olavarria sued the remaining band members for wrongful removal. The lawsuit was settled in 1984. Olavarria later joined Martin Atkins' band Brian Brain.

=== Career peak (1981–1983) ===
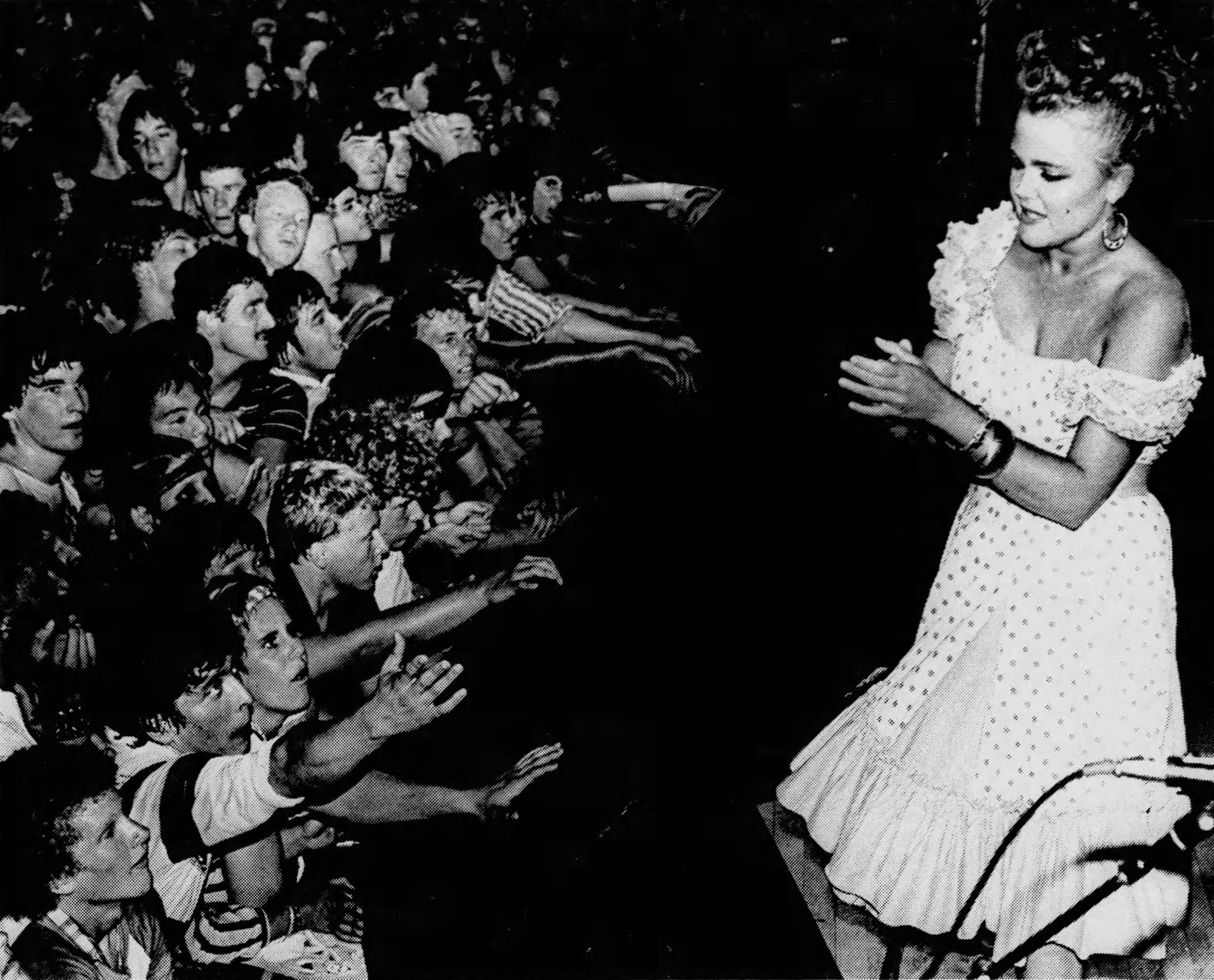
Belinda Carlisle performing with the Go-Go's in 1981

The Go-Go's signed to Miles Copeland's label I.R.S. Records in April 1981. The following year they toured with The Police, who were managed by Copeland, on the Ghost in the Machine Tour. The Go-Go's debut album, Beauty and the Beat, was a surprise hit: it topped the U.S. charts for six weeks in 1982 and eventually received a double Platinum certification. The album was also successful outside the U.S., charting at number 2 in Canada, where it received a Platinum certification, and number 27 in Australia. In 2003, the album was ranked number 413 on Rolling Stone magazine's list of The 500 Greatest Albums of All Time. "Our Lips Are Sealed" and a new version of "We Got the Beat" were popular singles in North America in early 1982. During this period, the Go-Go's started building a fanbase.

In 1982, the group was nominated for a Grammy Award for Best New Artist.

The follow-up album, Vacation, received mixed reviews and sold less than Beauty and the Beat. However, the album was certified Gold in the U.S. and spawned another Top 10 U.S. hit with the title track. Other singles released from the album were "Get Up and Go" and "This Old Feeling", neither of which made it into the Top 40. In 1983, Vacation was nominated for a Grammy Award for Best Packaging. During the album's promotion, the group went on hiatus when Schock underwent surgery for a congenital heart defect.

=== Talk Show and initial breakup (1984–1985) ===
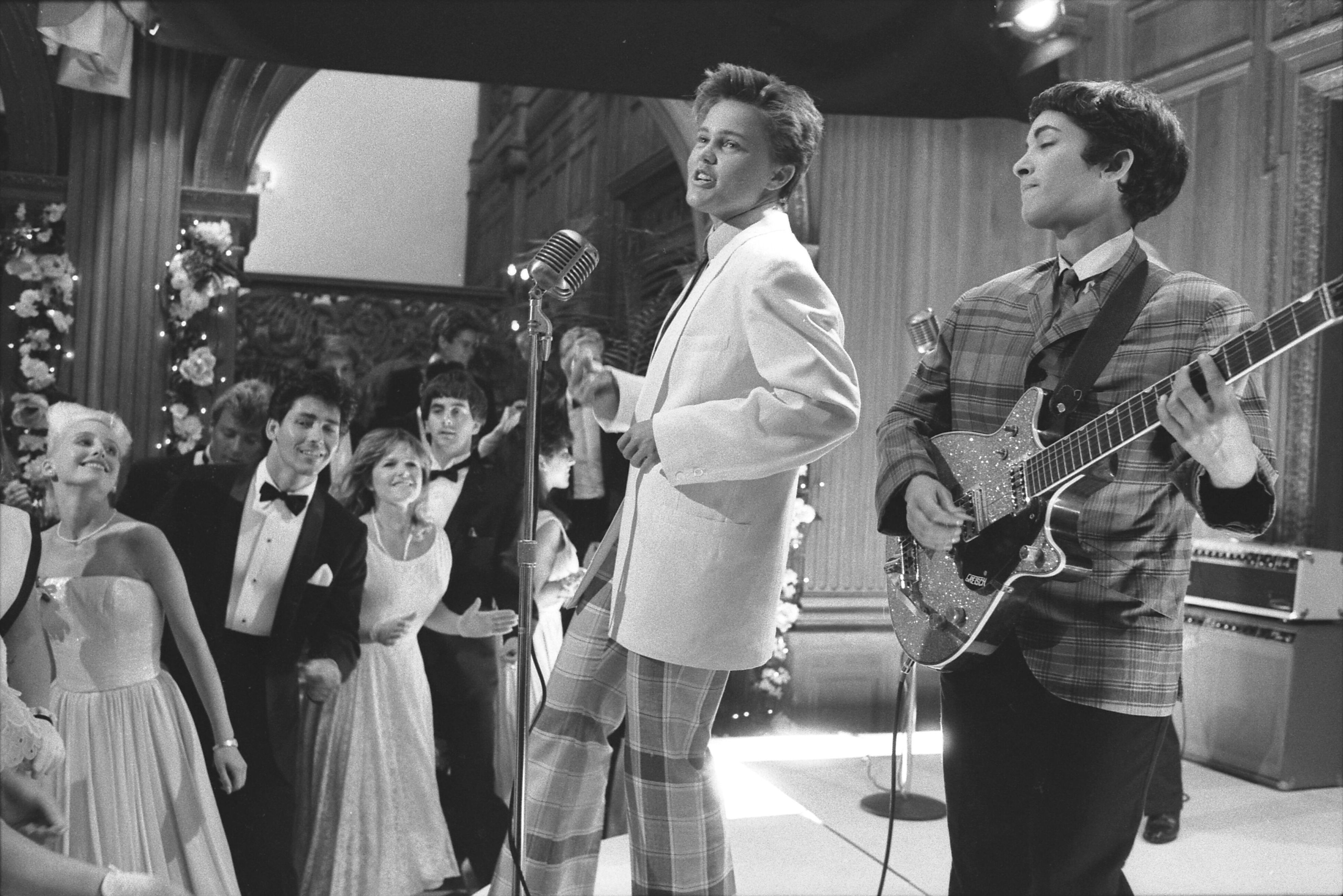
Belinda Carlisle and Jane Wiedlin in the "Turn to You" music video

In 1984, the group returned with the Martin Rushent-produced album Talk Show. The album tracks "Head over Heels" and "Turn to You" were both Top 40 hits in the US. Despite the favorable reception, the album sold less than the previous two, not reaching the Top 10 and not receiving any certification.

Personality conflicts and creative differences within the group were also taking a toll, as were drug addiction problems for some band members. Wiedlin announced her departure from the group in October 1984. The band sought a replacement, selecting Paula Jean Brown (of Giant Sand) as their new bass guitarist, with Valentine moving to rhythm guitar. This lineup debuted at the 1985 Rock in Rio festival, playing two shows, but Carlisle and Caffey soon realized their hearts were no longer in the group and decided to disband the Go-Go's in May 1985.

=== Reunions and lawsuit (1990–1999) ===
In 1990, the Go-Go's classic lineup (Caffey, Carlisle, Schock, Valentine, and Wiedlin) reunited to play a benefit concert for the California Environmental Protection Act, a 1990 ballot initiative. The band also entered the studio with producer David Z to re-record a cover of "Cool Jerk" (a song they had previously covered on their second LP) for a greatest hits compilation.

In 1994, the same lineup got together again to release a two-disc retrospective entitled Return to the Valley of The Go-Go's, featuring three new recordings. The single "The Whole World Lost Its Head" peaked at number 21 on the Billboard Modern Rock charts and "bubbled under" on the US charts at number 108, and became the band's first and only Top 40 hit in the UK, peaking at number 29. The band toured again to promote the release; ex-Bangle Vicki Peterson stood in on several dates for Caffey, who was pregnant.

In 1997, Schock sued the other group members, claiming that she had not been adequately paid for her contributions since 1986 and that a songwriting agreement with Caffey had been breached. The suit was resolved by 1999 and The Go-Go's toured regularly from 1999 onward.

=== God Bless The Go-Go's (2000–2009) ===
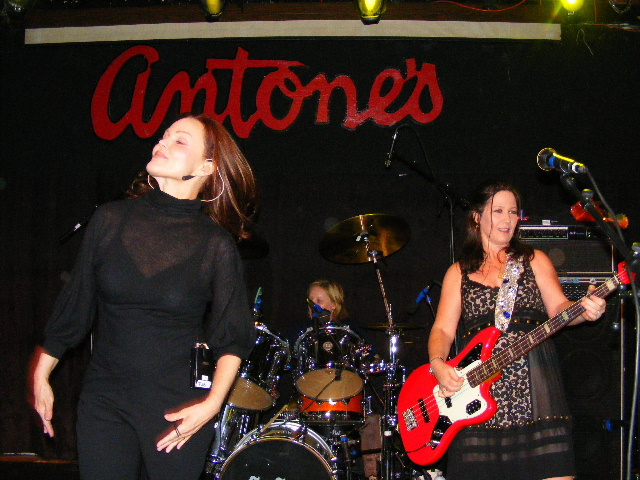
The band in Austin, Texas, 2008. L to R: Belinda Carlisle, Gina Schock, and Kathy Valentine. Off frame: Jane Wiedlin and Charlotte Caffey.

In 2001, the band (still with the "classic" lineup) released an album of new material, God Bless the Go-Go's. Green Day's lead singer Billie Joe Armstrong co-wrote the only released single, "Unforgiven", which peaked at number 22 on Billboard's Adult Top 40 chart. The album was well received by critics and peaked at number 57 in the Billboard 200 chart. The band also released a DVD of their reunion concert in Central Park.

Also in 2001, The Go-Go's, along with artists Elton John, Billy Joel, David Crosby and Paul Simon, performed at the concert "An All-Star Tribute to Brian Wilson" at Radio City Music Hall, hosted by the TNT network.

In 2002 The Go-Go's recorded the theme song for the WB comedy series "Do Over". Written by Charlotte Caffey, Kathy Valentine, and Jane Wiedlin, the track was recorded in Los Angeles for the show, which premiered on Sept. 19 on the network.

In 2004 the band hosted a concert in Costa Mesa together with The Motels.

=== Farewell tour, departure (and return) of Kathy Valentine and Broadway musical (2010–2019) ===
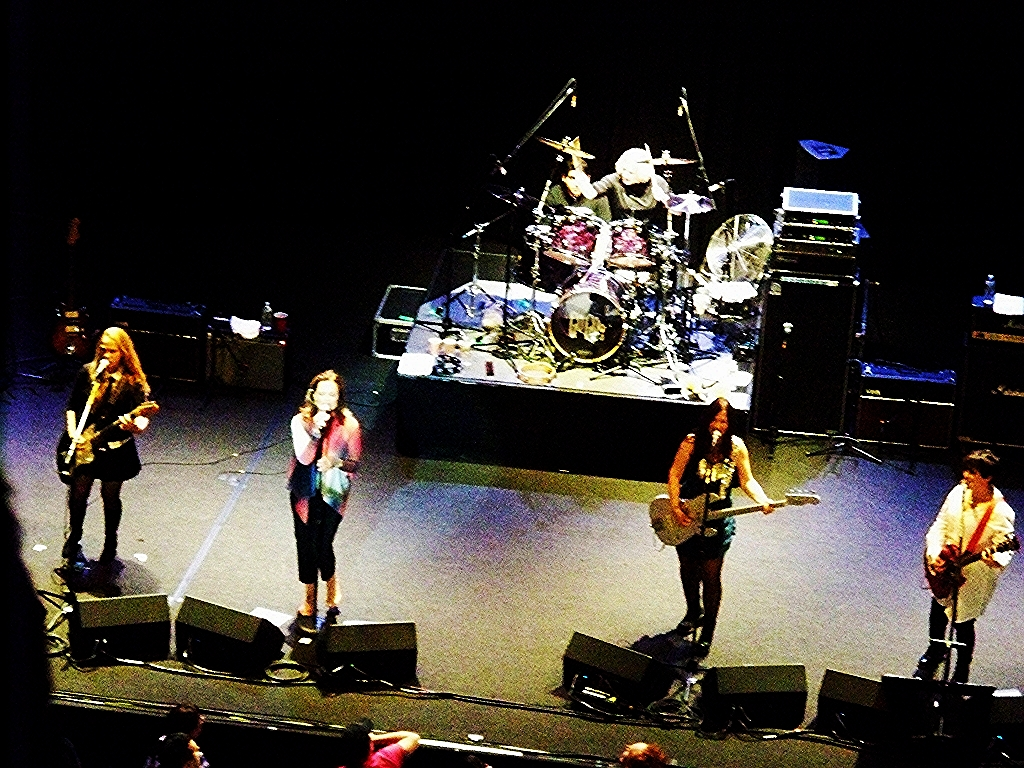
The band performing in 2012

In February 2010, Carlisle announced that the 2010 tour would be billed as the "Farewell Tour", but this tour was canceled when Wiedlin injured her knee while hiking near her home in Northern California, requiring surgery and up to a year of recovery time.

After 2010, the idea of a farewell tour seemed to have been abandoned, with The Go-Go's touring frequently. In 2011, The Go-Go's announced the "Ladies Gone Wild" tour to commemorate the 30th anniversary of the release of Beauty and the Beat. They toured the US in 2012, with Abby Travis subbing for an injured Valentine during the latter part of the tour.

On March 8, 2013, the group's official website said "irreconcilable differences" had led to the departure of bassist Valentine. On May 24, Valentine sued her former bandmates for "breach of fiduciary duty and abuse of control...in an attempt to deprive [her] of her position and interest in the group". Officially a quartet (Caffey, Carlisle, Schock, and Wiedlin—Travis continued to play bass, but was not an official group member), The Go-Go's continued on, playing a series of tour dates in 2013 and 2014, including several double bills with the B-52's.

In 2014, the band was inducted into the Hollywood Bowl Hall of Fame. That same year, Valentine's lawsuit against her former bandmates was settled out of court.

We're not breaking up, per se – we're just not going to be doing the touring like we've been doing for many, many years. We might still do a date here or there, or do a benefit or something like that, but not do the big touring anymore. So that's what that's about.

— Charlotte Caffey

On March 21, 2016, plans for a The Go-Go's farewell tour (minus Valentine) were officially announced. A band statement said: "After a 38-year run, we are gearing up for one last blast of a summer tour".

Valentine rejoined the band to perform their first show together as a quintet in six years at New York's Bowery Ballroom on January 31, 2018, to announce the Broadway dates of their new musical, Head Over Heels. The new musical—which premiered at New York's Hudson Theatre in the summer of 2018—features the band's hits (including "Get Up and Go" and "Lust to Love") as well as Carlisle's solo hits "Mad About You" and "Heaven Is a Place on Earth". The musical had a preview at the Oregon Shakespeare Festival in 2015. Valentine's return to the band was permanent, and she would be involved in all future Go-Go's activity.

=== Documentary movie, Rock and Roll Hall of Fame induction, reunion tour (2020–2025) ===
In 2020, a documentary movie about the band premiered at Sundance, directed by Allison Ellwood after the band saw her work on the 2013 History of the Eagles documentary. In the US, the movie was seen on television on Showtime. The documentary features the formation and rise of the band through the 1980s breakup, skipping the lawsuits and reunions through the 1990s-2010s, ending with a 2019 reunion. On July 31, 2020, The Go-Go's released their first new song in 19 years, "Club Zero", which is featured in the documentary.

In January 2020, the band announced an 11-date reunion tour scheduled to begin in June 2020, however in May 2020 the tour was postponed due to the COVID-19 pandemic.

On October 30, 2021, the band was inducted by longtime fan Drew Barrymore into the Rock and Roll Hall of Fame.

On December 14, 2021, the band performed a special show, with most of the audience being contest winners, at the Whisky a Go Go to celebrate their induction. Clem Burke filled in on drums for Gina Schock. On December 27, 2021, the band postponed a short West Coast tour scheduled for the first week of January 2022 due to a COVID-19 case involving someone on the tour.

After playing six US dates in March 2022 (in Reno and several stops in California), the band announced plans for a 2022 UK tour with Billy Idol to start in June 2022. However, due to Billy Idol's illness, the tour had to be postponed, and the band could no longer participate in the tour.

In 2023, Belinda Carlisle declared that the group had disbanded, noting "we felt there was something to be said about leaving on a high note and it doesn't get much bigger than being inducted into the Hall of Fame. That's kind of the pinnacle. After that, we felt it was time." Their last show was their performance in San Diego on March 31, 2022.

The band reunited in Sacramento on February 7, 2024 to be inducted into the California Hall of Fame, and "played a short, rowdy, acoustic set" at the afterparty.

On October 21, 2024, the band announced via their official Instagram page that they were reuniting to play the Cruel World Festival, which was held on May 17, 2025, in Pasadena. On April 11, 2025, the band played Coachella supported by Billie Joe Armstrong of Green Day.

== Band members ==
=== Current ===
- Belinda Carlisle – lead vocals, percussion (1978–1985, 1990, 1994, 1999–2022, 2025)
- Jane Wiedlin – rhythm guitar, backing and occasional lead vocals (1978–1985, 1990, 1994, 1999–2022, 2025), lead guitar (1978)
- Charlotte Caffey – lead guitar, keyboards, backing vocals (1978–1985, 1990, 1994, 1999–2022, 2025)
- Gina Schock – drums (1979–1985, 1990, 1994, 1999–2022, 2025), backing vocals (1982–1985, 1990, 1994, 1999–2022, 2025)
- Kathy Valentine – bass, backing vocals (1980–1985, 1990, 1994, 1999–2012, 2018–2022, 2025), rhythm guitar (1985)

=== Former ===
- Margot Olavarria – bass (1978–1980)
- Elissa Bello – drums (1978–1979)
- Paula Jean Brown – bass (1985)

=== Touring ===
- Vicki Peterson – lead guitar, backing vocals (substitute 1994)
- Abby Travis – bass, backing vocals (2013–2018; substitute 2012)
- Clem Burke – drums (substitute 2021; died 2025)

== Discography ==
Studio albums

- Beauty and the Beat (1981)
- Vacation (1982)
- Talk Show (1984)
- God Bless the Go-Go's (2001)

== Books ==
- The Go-Go's: A YinPop Guide by S. White (2016). Fly-By-Night Books. ISBN 978-0-9905386-4-6.

== See also ==
- List of new wave artists
- List of all-female bands
