= Gina Schock =

American rock drummer (born 1957)

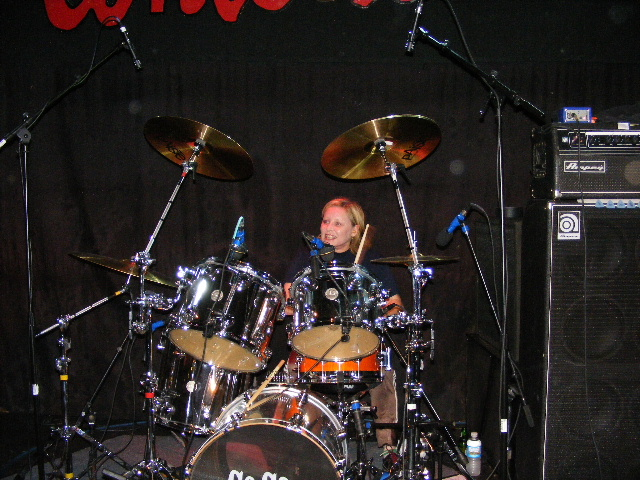
- Schock performing in 2008

Background information
- Born: Regina Ann Schock; August 31, 1957 (age 69); Baltimore, Maryland, U.S.
- Genres: Pop rock; new wave; power pop
- Occupations: Drummer; songwriter; memoirist
- Years active: 1977–present
- Website: ginaschock.com

Regina Ann Schock (born August 31, 1957) is an American musician and songwriter, best known as the drummer for the rock band the Go-Go's. She joined the group in 1979 and remained a member during its most active years in the early 1980s. Schock has also worked with other musical projects, contributed to songwriting for pop artists, and published a memoir. In 2021, she was inducted into the Rock and Roll Hall of Fame as a member of the Go-Go's.

== Early life ==
Regina Ann Schock was born in Baltimore, Maryland on August 31, 1957, to June and John Schock. She was raised in the nearby working-class suburb of Dundalk, where she lived in the German Hill neighborhood. Schock attended Sacred Heart of Mary School and The Catholic High School of Baltimore, both private Catholic institutions. Though she had a rebellious streak during her school years, she managed to avoid serious disciplinary issues. According to her mother, Schock possessed natural rhythmic talent and never received formal drumming lessons. From the age of thirteen, she would return home from school, put on headphones, and practice drumming for hours, a habit that tested her family's patience.

== Career ==
Schock's first professional musical engagement was with the band Scratch N Sniff, which performed at various venues throughout the Baltimore area. Her career gained significant momentum when she became the drummer for the female punk band Edie and the Eggs. This group had formed quickly with Edith Massey, the John Waters film star who happened to live in Schock's neighborhood, and soon embarked on a national tour. During their Los Angeles performances, future Go-Go's guitarist Charlotte Caffey attended one of their shows and was particularly impressed by both Massey's unique vocal style and Schock's powerful drumming technique. Following the tour, Schock announced her intention to relocate to Los Angeles, a decision that initially concerned her parents but ultimately gained their support, with her father assisting in converting his truck for her cross-country move.

After settling in Los Angeles, Schock attended a performance by the Go-Go's, one of the first bands she saw in her new city. She later met members of the group at a social gathering, coincidentally at a time when they were searching for a new drummer. In 1979, she officially joined the Go-Go's, replacing Elissa Bello as their permanent drummer. During the band's early struggling years, Schock worked at a grocery store and would occasionally take steaks to cook meals for her bandmates.

Schock remained an integral part of the Go-Go's through their initial period of success, recording and touring consistently until the group's dissolution in 1985. The band would later reunite for various performances in 1990 and 1994 before reforming more permanently.

In 1985, Schock made several television appearances as the drummer for the Norwegian band a-ha, though these were strictly promotional engagements and she never became an official member of the group. Two years later, in 1987, she collaborated with Vance DeGeneres to form the band House of Schock. In 1997, she joined Dominique Davalos and Kathy Valentine's musical project, the Delphines.

The year 1997 also saw Schock file a lawsuit against her Go-Go's bandmates regarding unpaid royalties. The legal action sought $100,000 in compensation along with a full financial accounting, as Schock claimed she had received no income from the band since 1986.

Schock demonstrated her songwriting abilities by co-writing, with Ted Bruner and Trey Vittetoe, the title track for Miley Cyrus' 2008 album Breakout. This composition had previously been recorded by Katy Perry. Her songwriting credits also include "Kiss & Tell," the b-side to "Naturally" recorded in 2009 by Selena Gomez for her album Kiss & Tell.

The 2020 documentary The Go-Go's, directed by Alison Ellwood, featured extensive material from Schock's personal archives. Schock later revealed that she had provided "99% of the photos in Alison's documentary". The Go-Go's had planned an 11-date reunion tour scheduled to begin in June 2020, but the COVID-19 pandemic forced its postponement in May of that year. May 2021 brought the announcement that the Go-Go's would be inducted into the Rock and Roll Hall of Fame. The band later confirmed plans for a UK tour with Billy Idol scheduled for June 2022, though this was ultimately cancelled due to Idol's health issues, after which the Go-Go's disbanded.

In 2021, Schock published her book Made in Hollywood: All Access With the Go-Go's, a combination of her personal photographs documenting the band's history and her own written memoirs. The publication includes contributions from notable figures such as Jodie Foster, Paul Reubens, Martha Quinn, Kate Pierson, Dave Stewart, and members of the Go-Go's, with a foreword written by Kathy Valentine.

== Personal life ==
In 1984, Schock underwent open-heart surgery to repair a congenital heart defect after being diagnosed with a hole in her heart. This medical procedure occurred just before the tour supporting the Go-Go's 1984 album Talk Show. During the 2020 documentary The Go-Go's, Schock disclosed that she and bandmate Jane Wiedlin had been romantically involved for a period before Wiedlin ended their relationship.
