= Charlotte Caffey =

American guitarist (born 1953)

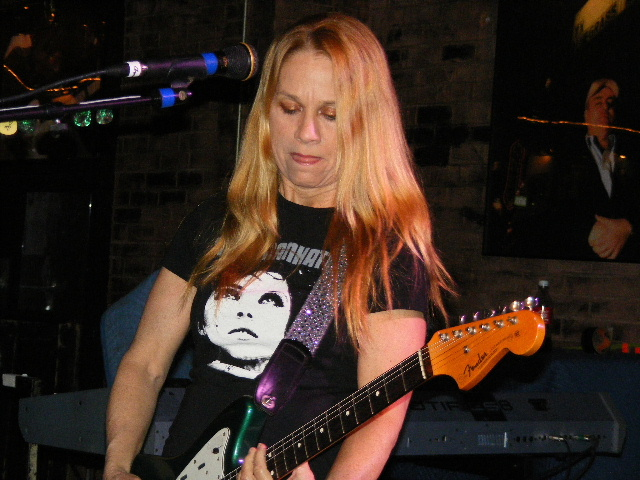
- Caffey in 2008

Background information
- Born: Charlotte Irene Caffey; October 21, 1953 (age 72); Santa Monica, California, U.S.
- Genres: Punk rock; pop rock; new wave; power pop
- Occupations: Musician; songwriter; singer
- Instruments: Guitar; keyboards; vocals
- Years active: 1977–present

Charlotte Irene Caffey (born October 21, 1953) is an American guitarist and keyboardist, best known for her work in the rock band the Go-Go's in the 1980s, including writing "We Got the Beat".

== Career ==
Caffey began her musical career playing bass guitar in the early Los Angeles punk band The Eyes before joining the Go-Go's in 1978 and switching to guitar. She remained friends with fellow band member Belinda Carlisle after the initial breakup of the Go-Go's and wrote songs for Carlisle's solo albums.

From 1988 until 1992, she led her own band, The Graces, with Meredith Brooks and Gia Ciambotti, who released the album Perfect View in 1989. Caffey also co-wrote the theme song to the television series Clueless with Anna Waronker, and played piano on the album version of "Foolish Games" by Jewel, as well as co-writing the No. 1 U.S. country hit "But for the Grace of God" with Keith Urban.

Caffey wrote the book, music, and lyrics for Lovelace: A Rock Musical with Anna Waronker. The rock musical debuted at the Hayworth Theatre in Los Angeles in 2008. A new production of Lovelace: A Rock Musical made its United Kingdom debut at the Edinburgh Festival Fringe in August 2010. A number of her songs were featured in the 2018 debut of the Broadway musical Head Over Heels, with a story suggested by Philip Sidney's Arcadia set to the songs of the Go-Go's and Belinda Carlisle.

The Go-Go's announced an 11-date reunion tour scheduled to begin in June 2020; however, in May 2020 the tour was postponed due to the COVID-19 pandemic. In May 2021 it was announced that The Go-Go's would be inducted into the Rock and Roll Hall of Fame. The band confirmed plans for a 2022 UK tour with Billy Idol that would start in June 2022. The band was forced to postpone a short West Coast tour scheduled for the first week of January 2022 due to a COVID-19 case involving someone on the tour.

== Personal life ==
Charlotte Caffey grew up in Glendale, California, she studied classical piano and was a trained musician before joining the Go-Go's. She played piano from the age of 4 and went on to study music at Immaculate Heart College in Los Angeles, graduating with a music degree in 1975.

She is also in Ze Malibu Kids with her husband, the Redd Kross singer and guitarist Jeff McDonald. Their only child, a daughter named Astrid McDonald, was born in 1995 and is a singer and model.

She was the fourth of twelve children born to Ann (née Gorey) and Michael Caffey (died 2017), an American director of network television series.

Caffey semi-retired from regular performances in the late 1980s because of crippling carpal tunnel syndrome.

== Discography ==
=== With The Eyes ===
- 1978: Don't Talk To Me [Single] (What Records?) - bass

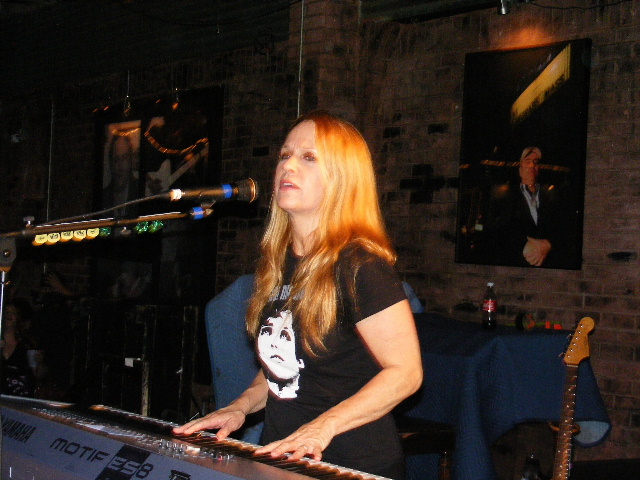
Caffey in 2008

=== With The Go-Go's ===
- 1981: Beauty and the Beat (IRS)
- 1982: Vacation (I.R.S.)
- 1984: Talk Show (I.R.S.)
- 2001: God Bless The Go-Go's (Beyond Music)

=== With The Graces ===
- 1989: Perfect View (A&M)

=== Also appears on ===
- 1980: The Specials – More Specials (2 Tone) – backing vocals
- 1982: Robert Williams – Late One Night (A&M) – vocals on track 8, "Gotta Be Nice"
- 1986: Belinda Carlisle – Belinda (I.R.S.) – vocals, guitar
- 1988: Blake Xolton – Cool on My Skin (New Rose) – vocals
- 1995: Jewel – Pieces of You (Atlantic) – arranger, piano
- 1998: Penelope Houston – Tongue (Reprise) – guitar, vocals on track 2, "Tongue"
