= Greatest (The Go-Go's album) =

Greatest hits album by the Go-Go's
- Released: October 5, 1990
- Recorded: 1981–1984, 1990
- Genre: Pop rock, new wave, post-punk
- Length: 46:45
- Label: I.R.S.

The Go-Go's chronology
Talk Show (1984)	Greatest (1990)	Return to the Valley of the Go-Go's (1994)

Singles from Greatest
- 1. "Cool Jerk" / "We Got the Beat" Released: 1990

Professional ratings
Review scores
Source	Rating
AllMusic	4/5 stars
The Rolling Stone Album Guide	4/5 stars
The Village Voice	A

Greatest is a 1990 compilation album by American rock band the Go-Go's. The record, which represents the first best-of album by the Go-Go's, includes most of the hits and stand-out tracks from the band's first three studio albums, 1981's Beauty and the Beat, 1982's Vacation, and 1984's Talk Show, only omitting three minor hit singles, "He's So Strange", "This Old Feeling", and "Yes or No".

The collection does not include any new songs, except for a re-recording of the band's cover version of "Cool Jerk" (which had first been covered by the band on Vacation), which was also released as the one single from the compilation, reaching number 60 on the UK Singles Chart in 1991 and becoming the second Go-Go's song to ever enter the British charts (the third and highest UK hit from the band would eventually be "The Whole World Lost Its Head", peaking at number 29, from their second greatest hits album, 1994's Return to the Valley of the Go-Go's).

A mint-green vinyl re-release of the album was released through Target in July 2020.

== Track listing ==
No.	Title	Writer(s)	Album	Length
1.	"Our Lips Are Sealed"	Jane Wiedlin, Terry Hall	Beauty and the Beat, 1981	2:44
2.	"Cool Jerk" (re-recording)	Donald Storball	Original version on Vacation, 1982	3:07
3.	"We Got the Beat"	Charlotte Caffey	Beauty and the Beat	2:30
4.	"Head over Heels"	Caffey, Kathy Valentine	Talk Show, 1984	3:36
5.	"Get Up and Go"	Caffey, Wiedlin	Vacation	3:17
6.	"Vacation"	Caffey, Wiedlin, Valentine	Vacation	3:00
7.	"Beatnik Beach"	Belinda Carlisle, Caffey	Vacation	2:50
8.	"You Thought"	Gina Schock, Valentine	Talk Show	4:18
9.	"I'm the Only One"	Carlene Carter, Danny B. Harvey, Valentine	Talk Show	3:33
10.	"This Town"	Caffey, Wiedlin	Beauty and the Beat	3:18
11.	"Lust to Love"	Caffey, Wiedlin	Beauty and the Beat	4:03
12.	"Mercenary"	Caffey, Wiedlin, Valentine	Talk Show	3:35
13.	"How Much More"	Caffey, Wiedlin	Beauty and the Beat	3:04
14.	"Turn to You"	Caffey, Wiedlin	Talk Show	3:50

== Chart positions ==
=== Album ===
Chart (1990)	Peak position	Certification	Sales
U.S. Billboard 200	127	—	402,000+

=== Singles ===
Year	Song	U.S. Hot 100	UK Singles Chart
1991	"Cool Jerk"	-	60
