= 2013 in British music =

This is a summary of the year 2013 in British music.

== Events ==
- 7 February – Warner Music Group agrees to acquire Parlophone from Universal Music Group for £487 million, as part of Universal's required divestments after acquiring EMI.
- 1 March – Karl Jenkins signs to Deutsche Grammophon and announces a new album, to be called Adiemus Colores.
- 3 March – Aled Jones returns to Classic FM as a regular presenter.
- 8 March – David Bowie releases his first studio album in over ten years, The Next Day, which peaks at number one on the UK Albums Chart.
- 9 March – George Benjamin conducts the UK première of his opera Written on Skin at the Royal Opera House, Covent Garden.
- 29 March – Bryan Ferry is listed as one of the fifty best-dressed over 50s by The Guardian.
- 10 April – Kate Bush receives the Commander of the Most Excellent Order of the British Empire (CBE) insignia from Queen Elizabeth II at Windsor Castle.
- 18 May – Bonnie Tyler represents the United Kingdom in the 2013 Eurovision Song Contest, singing "Believe in Me", amassing a total of 28 points to finish in 19th place.
- 14–16 June – Download Festival 2013 takes places at Donington Park in Leicestershire. The main stage is headlined by Slipknot, Iron Maiden and Rammstein, the Zippo encore stage by Black Stone Cherry, Enter Shikari and Limp Bizkit, the Pepsi Max stage by HIM, The Hives and Satyricon, the Red Bull Studios stage by Fearless Vampire Killers, Last Witness and Sonic Boom Six, and the Jägermeister acoustic stage by We Are the Ocean, Devin Townsend and Heaven's Basement.
- 16–23 June – BBC Cardiff Singer of the World 30th anniversary competition takes place in St David's Hall, Cardiff.
- 7 September
  - Marin Alsop becomes the first woman to conduct the Last Night of the Proms. Nigel Kennedy performs Ralph Vaughan Williams' The Lark Ascending, and Joyce DiDonato is the soloist for the traditional performance of "Rule, Britannia!".
  - Sophie Ellis-Bextor is among the 15 celebrities competing in the opening round of the 11th series of Strictly Come Dancing.
- 14 October – Paul McCartney releases New, his first album of totally new material since 2007's Memory Almost Full; it enters the UK Albums Chart at number three on 20 October 2013.
- 24 November – Robbie Williams' album Swings Both Ways becomes the 1000th album to reach number one on the UK Albums Chart.
- 14–15 December – The X Factor series final is won by Sam Bailey. Nicholas McDonald is named runner-up, while Luke Friend and Rough Copy finish in third and fourth place respectively.
- 18 December – Former Lostprophets lead singer Ian Watkins is sentenced to 29 years in prison with a further six on licence after pleading guilty to thirteen child sexual offences.
- 30 December – Musicians included in the New Year Honours list for 2014 include conductor Sir Simon Rattle (OM), pianist Stephen Hough (CBE), singer Katherine Jenkins (OBE) and DJ Pete Tong (MBE).

== Publications ==
- Francis Jackson – Music for a Long While

== Television series ==
- 26 January – Howard Goodall's Story of Music, a six-part series made for BBC Two, begins its run.
- 20 July – David Starkey's Music and Monarchy begins its run on BBC Two.
- 12 September – Sound of Cinema: the Music that Made the Movies, introduced by Neil Brand, begins its run on BBC Four.
- 13 November – The Sound of Musicals begins its run on Channel 4.
- 14 November – Requiem: documentary on the history of the requiem on BBC Four, featuring Elin Manahan Thomas, Tenebrae, Bryn Terfel and Jane Glover.

== Artists/groups reformed ==
- The Boomtown Rats
- Northside
- S Club Juniors (4 of the 8 original members)

== Groups disbanded ==
- Parade
- Girls Aloud
- JLS
- Sugababes
- District3
- Lostprophets
- Chapel Club
- Bingo Players
- Babybird

== Platinum records ==
For a record to be certified platinum, it must sell a minimum of 600,000 copies. However, not every song that sells 600,000 copies is given platinum certification and so this is not a complete list of songs that have sold 600,000 copies in 2012. Also note that a song certified platinum could have sold its 600,000th copy long before it is given certification.

Artist	Song	Date released	Date certified platinum
Adele	"Set Fire to the Rain"	4 July 2011	25 January 2013
Adele	"Skyfall"	29 October 2012	25 January 2013
James Arthur	"Impossible"	9 December 2012	15 February 2013
One Direction	"What Makes You Beautiful"	11 September 2011	15 February 2013
Rihanna	"Diamonds"	30 September 2012	15 February 2013
Robbie Williams	"Candy"	8 October 2012	22 July 2013

== Classical music ==
=== New works ===
- Richard Baker – The Tyranny of Fun
- Harrison Birtwistle – Construction with Guitar Player
- Peter Maxwell Davies – Symphony No. 10 ("Alla ricerca di Borromini"), Op. 237
- Howard Goodall – More Tomorrows
- James MacMillan – Piano Concerto no 3

=== Opera ===
- Iain Bell – A Harlot's Progress
- David Bruce – The Firework-Maker's Daughter
- Julian Wagstaff – Breathe Freely (premièred 24 October)

== Film scores and incidental music ==
- Mica Levi – Under the Skin
- Rachel Portman – Belle

== Musical theatre ==
- 25 June – Charlie and the Chocolate Factory the Musical by David Greig, with music and lyrics by Marc Shaiman and Scott Wittman, receives its première at the Theatre Royal, Drury Lane.
- 23 October – From Here to Eternity the Musical by Stuart Brayson, Tim Rice and Bill Oakes, opens at the Shaftesbury Theatre, London.
- 19 December – Stephen Ward by Andrew Lloyd Webber and Don Black officially opens at the Aldwych Theatre, London.

== Musical films ==
- Sunshine on Leith, directed by Dexter Fletcher, starring George MacKay, Kevin Guthrie, Freya Mavor and Jane Horrocks.

== British music awards ==
=== BRIT Awards ===
The 2013 BRIT Awards were held on 20 February 2013 at The O2 Arena, London and hosted by James Corden. The 2013 award statuettes were designed by artist Damien Hirst and decorated with his familiar spot painting pattern.

- Best Male Solo Artist: Ben Howard
- British Female Solo Artist: Emeli Sandé
- British Breakthrough Act: Ben Howard
- British Group: Mumford & Sons
- Best British Single in association with Capital FM: "Skyfall" – Adele
- MasterCard British Album of the Year: Our Version of Events – Emeli Sandé
- International Male Solo Artist: Frank Ocean
- International Female Solo Artist: Lana Del Rey
- International Group: The Black Keys
- Best Live Act: Coldplay
- British Producer: Paul Epworth
- Special Recognition Award: War Child
- Critics' Choice: Tom Odell
- BRITs Global Success (for international sales in 2012): One Direction

=== Ivor Novello Awards ===
The 58th Ivor Novello Awards were held on 16 May 2013 at the Grosvenor House Hotel, London.

- Best Contemporary Song: "Pelican" – The Maccabees (written by Sam Doyle, Rupert Jarvis, Orlando Weeks, Felix White and Hugo White)
- PRS for Music Most Performed Work: "Next to Me" – Emeli Sandé (written by Hugo Chegwin, Harry Craze, Anup Paul and Emeli Sandé)
- Best Television Soundtrack: Lucian Freud: Painted Life (composed by John Harle)
- The Ivors Inspiration Award: Marc Almond
- Album Award: An Awesome Wave – Alt-J (written by Thomas Green, Joe Newman, Gwilym Sainsbury and Augustus Unger-Hamilton)
- The Ivors Classical Music Award: Errollyn Wallen
- PRS for Music Award for Outstanding Achievement: Justin Hayward
- Best Original Film Score: Anna Karenina (composed by Dario Marianelli)
- Best Song Musically and Lyrically: "Next to Me" – Emeli Sandé (written by Hugo Chegwin, Harry Craze, Anup Paul and Emeli Sandé)
- International Achievement: Gavin Rossdale
- Songwriter of the Year: Calvin Harris
- Outstanding Song Collection: Noel Gallagher
- PRS for Music Special International Award: Randy Newman

=== Classic BRIT Awards ===
The 2013 Classic BRIT Awards were held on 2 October 2013 at the Royal Albert Hall, London and hosted by Myleene Klass.

- Outstanding Contribution to Music in association with Raymond Weil: Hans Zimmer
- Lifetime Achievement Award: Luciano Pavarotti (posthumous)
- International Artist of the Year: Lang Lang
- Female Artist of the Year: Nicola Benedetti (The Silver Violin)
- Male Artist of the Year: Daniel Barenboim (Beethoven for All, Elgar/Carter Cello Concertos)
- MasterCard's Breakthrough Artist of the Year: Amy Dickson (Dusk & Dawn)
- Composer of the Year: Hans Zimmer (The Dark Knight Rises original soundtrack, Man of Steel original soundtrack)
- Critics' Award: Jonas Kaufmann (Wagner)
- Classic FM Album of the Year in association with MasterCard: Magic of the Movies – André Rieu

=== Q Awards ===
The 2013 Q Awards were held on 21 October 2013 at the Grosvenor House Hotel, London and were hosted by Al Murray as his character the Pub Landlord.

- Best New Act presented by Mahiki: Jake Bugg
- Best Track: "Do I Wanna Know?" – Arctic Monkeys
- Poet Laureate: John Cooper Clarke
- Spirit of Independence: Belle and Sebastian
- Best Event: Glastonbury Festival
- Best Video powered by Alcatel: "Show Me the Wonder" – Manic Street Preachers
- Classic Album: Bummed – Happy Mondays
- Q Idol: Robbie Williams
- Best Live Act: Foals
- Best Album presented by Bose: Opposites – Biffy Clyro
- Q Icon: Suede
- Best Solo presented by Citroën: Ellie Goulding
- Best Act in the World Today presented by Planet Rock: Vampire Weekend
- Classic Songwriter: Chrissie Hynde
- Outstanding Contribution to Music: Pet Shop Boys

=== Mercury Prize ===
The 2013 Barclaycard Mercury Prize was awarded on 30 October 2013 to James Blake for his album Overgrown.

=== Popjustice £20 Music Prize ===
The 2013 Popjustice £20 Music Prize was awarded on 30 October 2013 to Chvrches for their song "The Mother We Share".

=== British Composer Awards ===
The 11th British Composer Awards were held on 3 December 2013 at Goldsmiths' Hall, London.

- Instrumental Solo or Duo: Gigue Machine – Harrison Birtwistle
- Chamber: String Quartet No. 4 – Colin Matthews
- Vocal: Electra Mourns – Brian Elias
- Choral: Since It Was the Day of Preparation... – James MacMillan
- Wind Band or Brass Band: Mysteries of the Horizon – Nigel Clarke
- Orchestral: Rivers to the Sea – Joseph Phibbs
- Stage Works: Written on Skin – George Benjamin
- Liturgical: I Saw the Lord – Matthew Martin
- Sonic Art: No Such Object (Speed of Light) – Ed Baxter and Chris Weaver
- Contemporary Jazz Composition: Lifelines – John Surman
- Community or Educational Project: Pass the Torch, An Olympic Symphony – James Redwood
- Making Music Award: Dry Stone Walls of Yorkshire – Peter McGarr
- International Award: Woven Dreams – Toshio Hosokawa

== Deaths ==
- 9 January – Jim Godbolt, jazz writer, 90
- 10 January – Trevor Gordon, singer and songwriter (the Marbles), 64
- 16 January – Nic Potter, bassist (Van der Graaf Generator), 61
- 17 January – Lizbeth Webb, soprano and actress, 86
- 4 February – Reg Presley, singer, songwriter, musician (The Troggs), 71
- 11 February – Rick Huxley, bassist (The Dave Clark Five), 72
- 16 February
  - John Ayldon, singer and actor, 69
  - Tony Sheridan, singer-songwriter and guitarist, 72
- 18 February – Kevin Ayers, singer-songwriter and guitarist (Soft Machine and The Wilde Flowers), 68
- 6 March – Alvin Lee, singer and guitarist (Ten Years After), 68
- 7 March
  - Kenny Ball, jazz trumpeter, vocalist and bandleader, 82
  - Peter Banks, guitarist (Yes), 65
  - Jeffrey Skitch, operatic baritone, 85
- 8 March – Ricardo da Force, vocalist, rapper (The KLF, N-Trance), 45
- 12 March – Clive Burr, drummer (Iron Maiden), 56
- 15 March – Terry Lightfoot, jazz musician and bandleader, 77
- 10 April – Thomas Hemsley, opera singer, 85
- 13 April – Stephen Dodgson, composer, 89
- 14 April – Sir Colin Davis, conductor, 85
- 6 May – Steve Martland, composer, 53
- 8 May – Ken Whaley, Austrian-English bass player (Help Yourself, Ducks Deluxe, and Man) (b. 1946)
- 21 May – Trevor Bolder, English bass player, songwriter, and producer (Uriah Heep, The Spiders from Mars, and Cybernauts), 62 (cancer)
- 2 June – Nick Keir, singer-songwriter (The McCalmans), 60
- 16 June – Richard Marlow, organist and choral director, 74
- 23 June – Darryl Read, English singer-songwriter, drummer (Crushed Butler) and actor, 61 (motorcycle accident)
- 4 July – Bernie Nolan, singer and member of the Nolans, 52
- 17 July – Peter Appleyard, English-Canadian vibraphone player and composer, 84
- 1 August – John Amis, British broadcaster, classical music critic and opera singer, 91
- 13 August – Jon Brookes, drummer (The Charlatans), 44
- 12 September – Joan Regan, pop singer, 85
- 13 September – Peter Aston, English composer, 74
- 15 September – Jackie Lomax, guitarist and singer-songwriter, 69
- 18 September – Lindsay Cooper, rock and jazz musician (Henry Cow, Comus, Feminist Improvising Group), 62
- 8 August – Philip Chevron, Irish singer-songwriter (The Pogues), 56
- 19 October – Noel Harrison, actor, singer and Olympic skier, son of Rex Harrison, 79
- 30 October – Pete Haycock, musician (Climax Blues Band) and film score composer, 62
- 3 November – Bernard Roberts, pianist, 80
- 11 November – Billy Adamson, drummer (The Searchers)
- 12 November – Sir John Tavener, English composer of religious music, 69
- 14 November – Georgina Anderson, singer, 15 (liver cancer)
- 22 November – Brian Dawson, folk singer and song collector, 74
- 25 November – Bob Day, pop singer (The Allisons), 72.
- 26 November – Stan Stennett, Welsh comic entertainer, actor and jazz musician, 88
- 1 December – Richard Coughlan, English drummer (Caravan), 66 (pneumonia)
- 6 December – Stan Tracey, jazz pianist, 86
- 8 December – Edward Williams, English composer (Life on Earth), 92

== See also ==
- 2013 in British radio
- 2013 in British television
- 2013 in the United Kingdom
- List of British films of 2013
