= List of accolades received by The Dark Knight Rises =

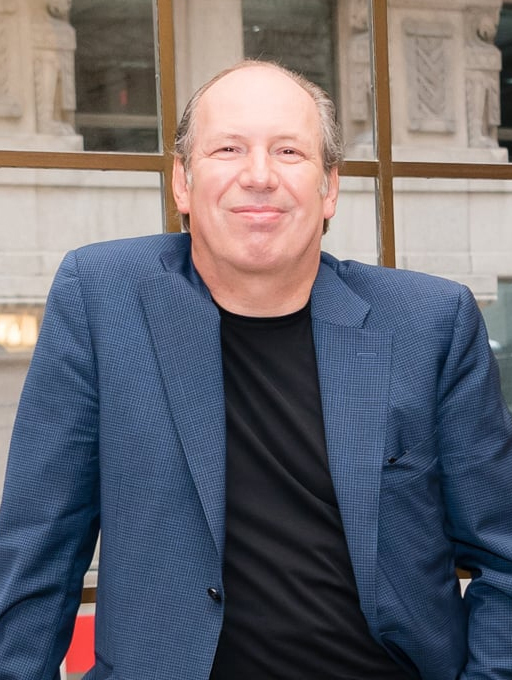
- Hans Zimmer received several awards and nominations for his contribution to the music of The Dark Knight Rises
Accolades
Award	Won	Nominated
American Film Institute	1	1
Art Directors Guild	0	1
ASCAP Film and Television Music Awards	1	1
British Academy Film Awards	0	1
BMI Film & TV Awards	1	1
Brit Awards	1	1
Critics' Choice Movie Awards	0	4
Denver Film Society	1	1
Dorian Awards	1	1
Empire Awards	0	3
Golden Eagle Awards	0	1
Golden Trailer Awards	4	5
Grammy Awards	0	1
Hollywood Film Awards	2	2
Hollywood Post Alliance Awards	0	1
IGN People's Choice Award	4	4
International Film Music Critics Association	0	1
Irish Film and Television Awards	1	3
Japan Academy Film Prize	0	1
Key Art Awards	2	2
Kids Choice Awards	0	1
Los Angeles Film Critics Association	0	1
Motion Picture Sound Editors	0	2
MTV Movie & TV Awards	0	6
New York Film Critics Circle Awards	0	1
People's Choice Awards	0	4
Rembrandt Awards	0	3
Russian National Movie Awards	0	2
Sant Jordi Awards	1	1
Satellite Awards	0	2
Saturn Awards	1	6
Scream Awards	1	1
Screen Actors Guild Awards	0	1
St. Louis Film Critics Association	0	1
Teen Choice Awards	1	5
USC Scripter Award	1	1
Visual Effects Society	0	1
World Stunt Awards	2	2
Young Artist Awards	0	1
- Total number of awards and nominations
Totals	27	81
- References

The Dark Knight Rises is a 2012 superhero film directed by Christopher Nolan, who co-wrote the screenplay with his brother Jonathan Nolan, and the story with David S. Goyer. Based on the DC Comics character Batman, it is the final installment in Nolan's The Dark Knight trilogy, and the sequel to The Dark Knight (2008). The film stars Christian Bale as Bruce Wayne / Batman, alongside Michael Caine, Gary Oldman, Anne Hathaway, Tom Hardy, Marion Cotillard, Joseph Gordon Levitt, and Morgan Freeman. Eight years after the events of The Dark Knight, the revolutionary Bane forces Bruce Wayne to resume his role as Batman and save Gotham City from nuclear destruction.

The Dark Knight Rises premiered in New York City on July 16, 2012 and was released in the United States and the United Kingdom on July 20, 2012. The film grossed over $1 billion worldwide, making it the second film in the Batman film series to earn $1 billion, the highest-grossing Batman film, as well as Nolan's highest-grossing film to date. It was the third-highest-grossing film of 2012. It was named one of the top 10 films of 2012 by the American Film Institute and received numerous accolades including a nomination at the 66th British Academy Film Awards.

== Accolades ==
Award	Category	Recipients	Result	Ref.
Alliance of Women Film Journalists	Kick Ass Award for Best Female Action Star	Anne Hathaway	Nominated	
American Film Institute Awards	Top 10 Movies of the Year	Emma Thomas, Christopher Nolan and Charles Roven	Won	
Art Directors Guild Awards	Excellence in Production Design Award	Nathan Crowley	Nominated	
ASCAP Awards	Top Box Office Films	Hans Zimmer	Won	
Austin Film Critics Association	Special Honorary Award	Joseph Gordon-Levitt	Won	
British Academy Film Awards	Special Visual Effects	Paul Franklin, Chris Corbould, Peter Bebb, Andrew Lockley	Nominated	
BMI Film & TV Award	Film Music	Hans Zimmer	Won	
Brit Awards	Outstanding Contribution To Music	Hans Zimmer	Won	
Critics' Choice Movie Awards	Best Visual Effects	The Dark Knight Rises	Nominated	
Critics' Choice Movie Awards	Best Action Film	The Dark Knight Rises	Nominated	
Critics' Choice Movie Awards	Best Actor in an Action Movie	Christian Bale	Nominated	
Critics' Choice Movie Awards	Best Actress in an Action Movie	Anne Hathaway	Nominated	
Denver Film Society	Best Original Score	Hans Zimmer	Won	
Empire Awards	Best Film	The Dark Knight Rises	Nominated	
Empire Awards	Best Director	Christopher Nolan	Nominated	
Empire Awards	Best Actress	Anne Hathaway	Nominated	
Golden Eagle Award	Best Foreign Language Film	The Dark Knight Rises	Nominated	
Golden Trailer Awards	Best in Show	"Chant"	Won	
Golden Trailer Awards	Summer 2012 Blockbuster Trailer	"Chant"	Won	
Golden Trailer Awards	Best International Poster	"UK Quad"	Won	
Golden Trailer Awards	Best Summer 2012 Blockbuster Poster	"Teaser One Sheet – City"	Won	
Golden Trailer Awards	Best Teaser Poster	"Teaser One Sheet – City"	Nominated	
Grammy Awards	Best Score Soundtrack For Visual Media	The Dark Knight Rises (Original Motion Picture Soundtrack)	Nominated	
Hollywood Film Festival	Cinematographer of the Year	Wally Pfister	Won	
Hollywood Film Festival	Actress of the Year	Marion Cotillard (also for Rust and Bone)	Won	
Hollywood Post Alliance Awards	Outstanding Editing – Feature Film	Lee Smith	Nominated	
IGN People's Choice Award	Best Movie	The Dark Knight Rises	Won	
IGN People's Choice Award	Best Comic Book Adaptation Movie	The Dark Knight Rises	Won	
IGN People's Choice Award	Best Movie Actress	Anne Hathaway (also for Les Misérables)	Won	
IGN People's Choice Award	Best Movie Trailer	The Dark Knight Rises	Won	
International Film Music Critics Association Awards	Best Original Score for a Fantasy/Science Fiction/Horror Film	Hans Zimmer	Nominated	
Key Art Awards	Gold Key Art Award – Integrated Campaign	The Dark Knight Rises	Won	
Key Art Awards	Gold Key Art Award – Print Category	The Dark Knight Rises	Won	
Kids Choice Awards	Favorite Female Buttkicker	Anne Hathaway	Nominated	
Los Angeles Film Critics Association	Best Supporting Actress	Anne Hathaway (also for Les Misérables)	Runner-up	
Motion Picture Sound Editors	Best Sound Editing – Music in a Feature Film	Alex Gibson and Ryan Rubin	Nominated	
Motion Picture Sound Editors	Best Sound Editing – Sound Effects and Foley in a Feature Film	Richard King, Kenneth L. Johnson, Christopher Flick, John Roesch, Alyson Dee Moore, Michael W. Mitchell, Jeff Sawyer, Michael Babcock, Randle Akerson and Bryan O. Watkins	Nominated	
MTV Movie Awards	Best Movie	The Dark Knight Rises	Nominated	
MTV Movie Awards	Best Hero	Christian Bale	Nominated	
MTV Movie Awards	Best Hero	Anne Hathaway	Nominated	
MTV Movie Awards	Best Villain	Marion Cotillard	Nominated	
MTV Movie Awards	Best Villain	Tom Hardy	Nominated	
MTV Movie Awards	Best Fight	Christian Bale and Tom Hardy	Nominated	
MTV Movie Awards	Best Shirtless Performance	Christian Bale	Nominated	
New York Film Critics Circle Awards	Best Supporting Actress	Anne Hathaway (also for Les Misérables)	Nominated	
NME Awards	Best Film	The Dark Knight Rises	Nominated	
People's Choice Awards	Favorite Face of Heroism	Anne Hathaway	Nominated	
People's Choice Awards	Favorite Movie	The Dark Knight Rises	Nominated	
People's Choice Awards	Favorite Action Movie	The Dark Knight Rises	Nominated	
People's Choice Awards	Favorite Movie Franchise	The Dark Knight Rises	Nominated	
Rembrandt Awards	Best Foreign Film	The Dark Knight Rises	Nominated	
Rembrandt Awards	Best Foreign Actress	Anne Hathaway	Nominated	
Russian National Movie Awards	Best Foreign Drama of the Year	The Dark Knight Rises	Nominated	
Russian National Movie Awards	Best Foreign Action of the Year	The Dark Knight Rises	Nominated	
Sant Jordi Awards	Best Foreign Actress	Marion Cotillard (also for Rust and Bone)	Won	
Satellite Awards	Best Visual Effects	Chris Corbould and Paul Franklin	Nominated	
Satellite Awards	Best Art Direction and Production Design	Nathan Crowley, Kevin Kavanaugh, James Hambidge and Naaman Marshall	Nominated	
Saturn Awards	Best Action / Adventure Film	The Dark Knight Rises	Nominated	
Saturn Awards	Best Director	Christopher Nolan	Nominated	
Saturn Awards	Best Actor	Christian Bale	Nominated	
Saturn Awards	Best Supporting Actor	Joseph Gordon-Levitt	Nominated	
Saturn Awards	Best Supporting Actress	Anne Hathaway	Won	
Saturn Awards	Best Music	Hans Zimmer	Nominated	
Scream Awards	Most Anticipated Movie	The Dark Knight Rises	Won	
Screen Actors Guild Awards	Outstanding Performance by a Stunt Ensemble in a Motion Picture	The Dark Knight Rises	Nominated	
St. Louis Gateway Film Critics Association	Best Music	Hans Zimmer	Nominated	
Teen Choice Awards	Choice Movie: Action	The Dark Knight Rises	Nominated	
Teen Choice Awards	Choice Movie: Actor Action	Christian Bale	Nominated	
Teen Choice Awards	Choice Movie: Actress Action	Anne Hathaway	Won	
Teen Choice Awards	Choice Movie: Scene Stealer	Joseph Gordon-Levitt	Nominated	
Teen Choice Awards	Choice Movie: Best Villain	Tom Hardy	Nominated	
Taurus World Stunt Awards	Best Speciality Stunt	The Dark Knight Rises	Won	
Taurus World Stunt Awards	Best Stunt Rigging	The Dark Knight Rises	Won	
TEC Awards	Film Sound Production	The Dark Knight Rises	Won	
Visual Effects Society Awards	Outstanding Models in a Feature Motion Picture	Scott Beverly, Alan Faucher, Ian Hunter and Steve Newburn for "Airplane Heist"	Nominated	
Young Artist Award	Best Performance in a Feature Film – Supporting Young Actress	Joey King	Nominated	

== See also ==
- 2012 in film
- The Dark Knight trilogy
