= The Capitols =

American soul musical group (1962–1969)

- Origin: Detroit, Michigan, United States
- Genres: R&B, soul
- Years active: 1962–1969
- Label: Karen Records
- Members: Samuel George; Donald Storball; Richard Mitchell

The Capitols were an American soul trio based in Detroit, Michigan, known for their 1966 Billboard hit single "Cool Jerk".

== Formation and disbandment ==
The R&B trio formed in 1962 as "The Three Caps," with Samuel George as the lead vocalist and drummer, Don Storball (birth name: Don Norman) on backup vocals and guitar, and Richard Mitchell (birth name: Richard McDougall) on backup vocals and keyboard. After playing predominantly small gigs, they were discovered by former Ann Arbor radio DJ Ollie McLaughlin after performing at a local dance headlined by Barbara Lewis. After signing with the Karen record label, owned by McLaughlin, the group went on to record and release their first single in 1963, "Dog and Cat". The record displayed the upbeat energy of their later work, however the juvenile nature and lyrics of the song did not find a substantial audience. In light of the disappointing performance of their debut single, the group dissolved and pursued other ventures.

== Re-formation and "Cool Jerk" ==
The mid-1960s saw many dance crazes; one of the most popular ones was a dance called "the jerk". It consisted of holding the arms out in different positions and making thrusting motions with the hips. Though controversial for lewdness at the time, a particularly sexual version of the dance had become popular in Detroit clubs, called the "pimp jerk".

Seeking to capitalize on the popularity of the dance, and dance songs in general, Storball wrote a song about the pimp jerk, renaming it "Cool Jerk" in order to prevent possible banning by radio stations. Realizing that the song had potential, the group re-formed and contacted McLaughlin in order to secure studio time to record the song.

The song was recorded at Golden World Studios in Detroit on March 14, 1966, with the Motown house band The Funk Brothers. Though the song was meant to include a horn accompaniment, the contracted musicians failed to arrive for the recording session and their parts were omitted from the track. "Cool Jerk" was released late March 1966 and was a hit, reaching No. 7 on the Billboard Hot 100 and No. 2 on the Billboard R&B chart.

== Decline and dissolution ==
Attempting to exploit the success of their hit single, the Capitols released two albums in 1966, Dance the Cool Jerk and We Got a Thing That's in The Groove, both featuring mostly covers of popular Motown and soul songs. Both albums were somewhat of a commercial and critical failure, though Dance the Cool Jerk did spend one week in the Billboard 200 at number 95 in July 1966. The group released eight additional singles after "Cool Jerk", only two of which made the Billboard charts, getting no higher than number 65, relegating the group to one-hit wonder status. In late 1969, the group broke up for the final time.

Samuel George died on March 17, 1982, after he was fatally stabbed in a domestic dispute. Richard McDougall died on February 19, 1984, of unknown causes. Storball went on to a career in the Highland Park, Michigan, Police Department and, as of 1997, still lived in Detroit.

== Legacy ==
Though the group had a fairly short career and limited commercial success, their hit "Cool Jerk" has stood the test of time."Cool Jerk" enjoyed a long shelf life. It was used in the soundtracks of movies, including More American Graffiti (1979), Night and the City (1992), Home Alone 2: Lost in New York (1992), Calendar Girl (1993), Madagascar 3: Europe's Most Wanted (2012), It found a home in Cool Whip commercials (changing "Cool Jerk" to "Cool Whip").

Additionally, "Cool Jerk" has made many best-of lists, including "100 Greatest Rock Bass Performances" (number 70) and "VH1's 100 Greatest Dance Songs" (number 48). "Cool Jerk" was also played in Madagascar 3: Europe's Most Wanted in a few scenes.

== Discography ==
=== Singles ===
- "Dog and Cat" / "The Kick" (Karen 16) (1963)
- "Cool Jerk" (Karen) (1966)
- "Zig Zaggin'" / "I Got to Handle It" (Karen 1525) (1966)
- "We Got a Thing That's in the Groove" / "Tired of Runnin' from You" (Karen 1526) (1966)
- "Take a Chance on Me Baby" / "Patty Cake" (Karen 1534) (1967)
- "Cool Pearl" / "Don't Say Maybe Baby" (Karen 1536) (1967)
- "Afro Twist" / "Cool Jerk '68" (Karen 1537) (1968)
- "Ain't That Terrible" / "Soul Sister, Soul Brother" (Karen 1543) (1968)
- "When You're in Trouble" / "Soul Soul" (Karen 1546) (1969)
- "I Thought She Loved Me" / "When You're in Trouble" (Karen 1549) (1969)

=== Albums ===
- Dance the Cool Jerk (ATCO 33-190) (1966) (No. 95 US)
- We Got a Thing (ATCO 33-201) (1966)
- Golden Classics (Collectables, ASIN B0000008HE) (1990)
- The Very Best of the Capitols (Marginal, ASIN B000A2EXOM) (1997)
- Dance the Cool Jerk / We Got a Thing (Collectables, ASIN B000641ZLS) (2004)
- Cool Jerk (Collectables, ASIN B000E3LHRS) (2006)

== Covers ==
- "Cool Jerk" has been covered by many bands, most famously by the Go-Go's, who recorded three studio versions of the song.
- Todd Rundgren played a version of "Cool Jerk" as part of a medley on his A Wizard, A True Star album.
- The California Raisins did a cover of "Cool Jerk" on their album Meet the Raisins.
