= Cool Jerk =

1966 single by The Capitols

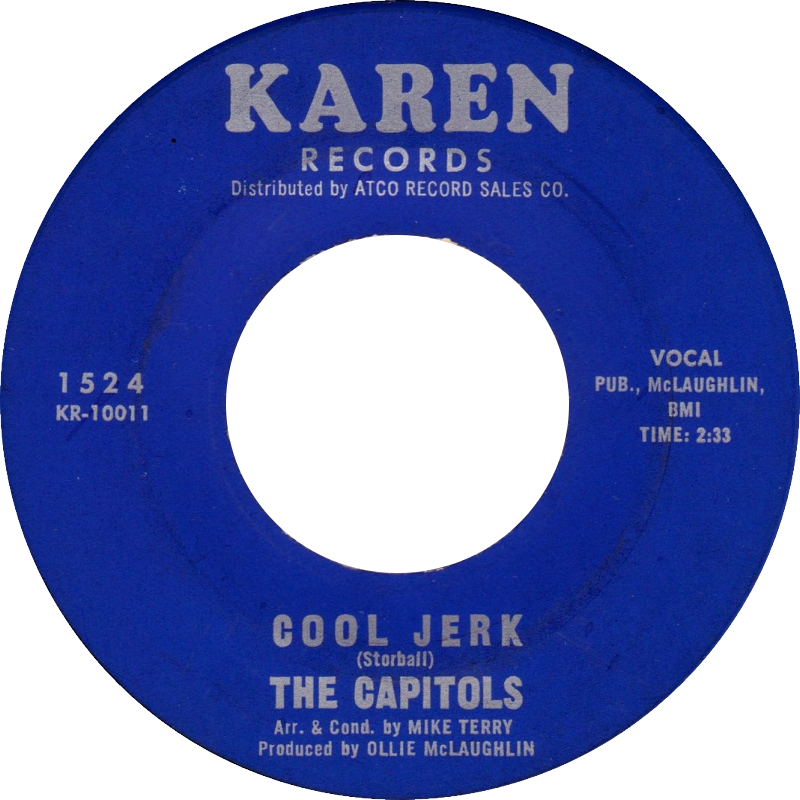
- A-side label of US vinyl release

Single by The Capitols

from the album Dance the Cool Jerk
- B-side: "Hello Stranger"
- Released: 1966
- Genre: Rhythm and blues
- Length: 2:45
- Label: Karen
- Songwriter: Donald Storball
- Producer: Ollie McLaughlin

The Capitols singles chronology
| "Dog and Cat" (1963) | "Cool Jerk" (1966) | "Zig Zaggin" (1966) |

"Cool Jerk" is a 1966 rhythm and blues song written by Donald Storball and originally performed by the Capitols. It became a hit song in the United States and Canada.

== Original version ==
Released in 1966, it reached No. 2 on the American Rhythm & Blues Singles chart, No. 7 on the Billboard Hot 100 and No. 9 on the Canadian Singles Chart. The session was arranged by Funk Brother Mike Terry, as the Funk Brothers, Motown's house band, played behind the Capitols on the track.

== Charts ==
=== Weekly charts ===
| Chart (1966) | Peak position |
|---|---|
| Canada Top Singles (RPM) | 9 |
| US Billboard Hot 100 | 7 |
| US Hot Rhythm & Blues Singles (Billboard) | 2 |
| US Cash Box Top 100 | 5 |
| US Record World Singles | 4 |

=== Year-end charts ===
| Chart (1966) | Position |
|---|---|
| US Billboard Hot 100 | 36 |
| US Hot Rhythm & Blues Singles (Billboard) | 2 |
| US Cash Box Top 100 | 23 |

== The Go-Go's version ==
The Go-Go's covered the song for their 1982 album Vacation and later re-recorded it for their 1990 album Greatest. A demo that pre-dates their Vacation recording was released on their 1994 compilation Return to the Valley of The Go-Go's.

"Cool Jerk"

Single by The Go-Go's

from the album Vacation
- Released: 1991
- Length: 2:53; 3:07 (Version from Greatest)
- Label: I.R.S. 75021 7439 2
- Songwriter: Donald Storball
- Producer: David Z

The Go-Go's singles chronology
| "Yes or No" (1984) | "Cool Jerk" (1991) | "The Whole World Lost Its Head" (1994) |

| Chart (1991) | Peak position |
|---|---|
| UK Singles (Official Charts) | 60 |
| UK Airplay (Music Week) | 29 |

== Legacy ==
The Capitols were a short-lived group, breaking up in 1969. They are usually called "one hit wonders." In contrast, "Cool Jerk" enjoyed a long shelf life. It was used in the soundtracks of movies, including More American Graffiti (1979), Night and the City (1992), Home Alone 2: Lost in New York (1992), Calendar Girl (1993), Madagascar 3: Europe's Most Wanted (2012), It found a home in Cool Whip commercials (changing "Cool Jerk" to "Cool Whip"). The song was ranked at #70 on Digital Dream Door’s list of 100 Greatest Rock Bass Performances, and at #48 on VH-1's 100 Greatest Dance Songs.

== Royalties dispute ==
Song writer Donald Storball sold the royalty payment rights, and a dispute wound up in litigation.

== See also ==
- List of 1960s one-hit wonders in the United States
