= The Dark Knight Rises =

2012 film by Christopher Nolan

- Theatrical release poster
- Directed by: Christopher Nolan
- Screenplay by: Jonathan Nolan; Christopher Nolan
- Story by: Christopher Nolan; David S. Goyer
- Based on: Characters appearing in comic books published by DC Comics
- Produced by: Emma Thomas; Christopher Nolan; Charles Roven
- Starring: Christian Bale; Michael Caine; Gary Oldman; Anne Hathaway; Tom Hardy; Marion Cotillard; Joseph Gordon-Levitt; Morgan Freeman
- Cinematography: Wally Pfister
- Edited by: Lee Smith
- Music by: Hans Zimmer
- Production companies: Warner Bros. Pictures; Legendary Pictures; Syncopy
- Distributed by: Warner Bros. Pictures
- Release dates: July 16, 2012 (New York City); July 20, 2012 (United States and United Kingdom)
- Running time: 164 minutes
- Countries: United States; United Kingdom
- Language: English
- Budget: $250–300 million (gross); $230 million (net)
- Box office: $1.085 billion (Note: This is the cumulative box office gross of the original theatrical release and subsequent re-releases.)

The Dark Knight Rises is a 2012 superhero film directed by Christopher Nolan, who co-wrote the screenplay with his brother Jonathan, and the story with David S. Goyer. Based on the DC Comics character Batman, it is the final installment in Nolan's The Dark Knight trilogy, and the sequel to The Dark Knight (2008). The film stars Christian Bale as Bruce Wayne / Batman, alongside Michael Caine, Gary Oldman, Anne Hathaway, Tom Hardy, Marion Cotillard, Joseph Gordon-Levitt, and Morgan Freeman. Set eight years after the events of The Dark Knight, it follows a retired Wayne being forced to resume his role as Batman to save Gotham City from nuclear destruction at the hands of the terrorist Bane (Hardy).

Christopher Nolan was hesitant about returning to the series for a third film, but agreed after developing a story with his brother and Goyer that he felt would conclude the series on a satisfactory note. Nolan drew inspiration from Bane's comic book debut in the 1993 "Knightfall" storyline, the 1986 series The Dark Knight Returns, and the 1999 storyline "No Man's Land". Filming took place from May to November 2011 in locations including Jodhpur, London, Nottingham, Glasgow, Los Angeles, New York City, Newark, and Pittsburgh. Nolan used IMAX 70 mm film cameras for much of the filming, including the first six minutes of the film, to optimize the quality of the picture. A vehicle variation of the Batplane and Batcopter termed the "Bat", an underground prison set, and a new Batcave set were created specially for the film. As with The Dark Knight, viral marketing campaigns began early during production. When filming concluded, Warner Bros. refocused its campaign, developing promotional websites, releasing the first six minutes of the film, screening theatrical trailers, and sending out information regarding the film's plot.

The Dark Knight Rises premiered in New York City on July 16, 2012, and was released in the United States and the United Kingdom on July 20. The film received positive reviews from critics, who deemed it a satisfying conclusion to the trilogy. It received a nomination for Special Visual Effects at the 66th British Academy Film Awards, and numerous other accolades, in addition to being named one of the top-ten films of 2012 by the American Film Institute. It also grossed $1.085 billion worldwide, making it the second film in the Batman film series to earn $1 billion, and the highest-grossing Batman film to date. It became Nolan's second-highest-grossing film, after The Odyssey (2026), as well as the seventh-highest-grossing film of all time at the time of its release and the third-highest-grossing film of 2012.

== Plot ==
Bane, a former member of the League of Shadows, leads an attack on a CIA plane over Uzbekistan to abduct nuclear physicist Dr. Leonid Pavel. Meanwhile, eight years after the death of Gotham City district attorney Harvey Dent and the arrest of the Joker, (Note: As depicted in The Dark Knight (2008)) organized crime has been eradicated in Gotham by the Dent Act, legislation that gives expanded powers to the police. Police commissioner Jim Gordon has kept Dent's killing spree a secret and allowed the blame for his crimes to fall on Batman. Bruce Wayne, still mourning the death of Rachel Dawes, has become a recluse.

Bane conspires with Wayne Enterprises board member John Daggett to take over the company by obtaining Bruce's fingerprints. Burglar Selina Kyle steals them from Wayne Manor for Daggett, but he refuses to provide the promised clean slate and orders his men to kill her. Selina subsequently alerts the police. Bane's henchmen capture Gordon in the sewers, but he escapes and is found by John Blake, a young orphaned police officer who has deduced Bruce's secret identity. Blake meets with Bruce and persuades him to resume his vigilantism. Bane leads an attack on the Gotham Stock Exchange and uses Bruce's fingerprints to authorize fraudulent transactions, leaving him bankrupt and ousted from his company. Bruce's butler, Alfred Pennyworth, resigns out of fear for Bruce's life and reveals that Rachel and Dent had intended to marry, hoping he would let go and move on. Meanwhile, Bane kills Daggett after seizing control of his construction operations, while Bruce and Wayne Enterprises' new CEO, Miranda Tate, become lovers.

Selina agrees to take Batman to Bane, but instead leads him into a trap beneath Wayne Tower. Bane reveals that he intends to carry on Ra's al Ghul's mission to destroy Gotham City and fulfill the League of Shadows' original purpose. He then brutally breaks Batman's back and cripples him in combat. Bane takes Bruce to an ancient underground prison in the Middle East, where he is left to recover under the watch of the prisoners. There, Bruce learns that Ra's al Ghul's child was born and raised in the prison but had a protector who eventually helped the child escape.

Back in Gotham, Bane detonates explosives to trap the police forces in the sewers and destroys all but one of the bridges surrounding the city, cutting off most access to the outside world. He kills Gotham mayor Anthony Garcia and forces Pavel to convert the fusion reactor core owned by Wayne Enterprises into a decaying neutron bomb before publicly killing him. Bane then exposes Dent's crimes to the city and releases the prisoners of Blackgate Penitentiary, effectively taking control of Gotham. He establishes a revolutionary regime, using the released prisoners as a militia to enforce his rule and having Gotham's elite exiled and executed in proletarian kangaroo courts presided over by Jonathan Crane. (Note: Crane returns from Batman Begins (2005) and The Dark Knight (2008).)

Five months later, Bruce, now healed, escapes the prison. As Batman, he returns to Gotham and frees the police, and together they war with Bane's militia. During the battle, Miranda stabs Batman, revealing herself as Ra's al Ghul's daughter Talia. Bane was her protector who had helped her escape the pit, becoming mauled in the process. Talia activates the bomb, but it fails due to Gordon blocking the signal. Selina kills Bane and helps Batman pursue Talia, hoping to return the bomb to the reactor chamber, where it can be stabilized. Talia's truck crashes, but she remotely floods and destroys the reactor chamber before dying. With no way to stop the detonation, Batman reveals his identity to Gordon, and uses his aerial craft, the Bat, to haul the bomb over the bay, where it safely explodes.

Batman is presumed dead and honored as a hero. Wayne Manor becomes an orphanage, and Bruce's estate is left to Alfred. Gordon finds the Bat-Signal repaired, while Lucius Fox discovers that Bruce had fixed the Bat's malfunctioning autopilot. In Florence, Alfred presumably discovers that Bruce is alive and in a relationship with Selina, and they acknowledge each other with a smile - it is left to the viewer‘s interpretation, however, if this is what actually happened and Bruce survived the detonation, or if it is just Alfred’s imagination and a nod to his formerly mentioned biggest wish for Bruce. Blake, whose legal first name is revealed as Robin, resigns from the police department and receives a package leading him to the Batcave.

== Cast ==
- Christian Bale as Bruce Wayne / Batman:
  A billionaire socialite who dedicates himself to protecting Gotham City from its criminal underworld as a heroic vigilante bringing justice. Nolan has stated that, due to the eight-year gap between The Dark Knight and The Dark Knight Rises, "he's an older Bruce Wayne; he's not in a great state." Bale employed a martial arts discipline called the Keysi Fighting Method, now modified for Wayne's current state and Bane's style. Bale has stated that The Dark Knight Rises would be his final Batman film. Bale acknowledged that Batman is "not a healthy individual, this is somebody that is doing good, but he's right on the verge of doing bad". Bale clarifies that "He doesn't want to forget [his parents' deaths]. He wants to maintain that anger he felt at that injustice". Bale felt bittersweet about leaving the franchise, saying that it was like "saying goodbye to an old friend."
- Michael Caine as Alfred Pennyworth:
  Bruce's trusted butler and confidant, who acts as a father figure to Wayne but is unable to accept Wayne's desire to revive his Batman persona, even resigning from his position to impress the seriousness of his position upon him. Christopher Nolan emphasized the emotional bond between Pennyworth and Wayne, stressing its importance in the previous films and hinting that the relationship will be strained as it never has before.
- Gary Oldman as James "Jim" Gordon:
  The commissioner of the Gotham City Police Department and one of the city's few honest police officers. Oldman described the character's work in cleaning up Gotham City as having left him world-weary and slightly bored, likening Gordon to a soldier who leaps at the chance to be on the front lines. His life has taken a turn for the worse since The Dark Knight; his wife has left him and taken their children, and the mayor is planning to dismiss him from his job. Gordon feels guilty over his role in covering up Harvey Dent's crimes and is prepared to resign from his position as Commissioner over it before sensing that Gotham is about to come under threat.
- Anne Hathaway as Selina Kyle / The Cat:
  A professional cat burglar, grifter, and femme fatale who establishes a playful, teasing relationship with Wayne that "takes some of the somberness away from his character", and pursues a "clean slate" (a computer program rumored to be able to erase a person's criminal history) when she crosses paths with both Wayne and Batman. Hathaway initially thought she was auditioning for the role of Harley Quinn, but after an hour of talking with Nolan, he revealed that he was considering her for Selina. Jessica Biel and Kate Mara were considered for the role. Hathaway described the role as being the most physically demanding she had ever played, and confessed that while she thought of herself as being fit, she had to redouble her efforts in the gym to keep up with the demands of the role. Hathaway trained extensively in martial arts for the role, and looked to Hedy Lamarr—who was the initial inspiration for the comic book character—in developing her own performance. Batman Begins and The Dark Knight writer David S. Goyer had previously ruled out in 2008 including Catwoman in a third film for having already appeared in Tim Burton's Batman Returns, portrayed by Michelle Pfeiffer.
- Tom Hardy as Bane:
  A mysterious and physically imposing terrorist who was excommunicated from the League of Shadows and portrays himself as a "liberator of pain" and revolutionary. He is intent on completing Ra's al Ghul's legacy by destroying Gotham. The character was chosen by Christopher Nolan because of his desire to see Batman tested on both a physical and mental level. According to costume designer Lindy Hemming, the character wears a mask that supplies him with an analgesic gas to relieve pain he suffers from an injury sustained "early in his story". Hardy intended to portray the character as "more menacing" than Robert Swenson's version of the character in Joel Schumacher's Batman & Robin and that in order to do so, his portrayal entailed creating a contradiction between his voice and body. Hardy gained 30 pounds (14 kg) for the role, increasing his weight to 200 pounds (90 kg). Hardy later said training for the role probably damaged his body. Hardy based Bane's voice on several influences, which include Bartley Gorman and the character's comic book heritage. Bane claims that his revolution's enemies are the rich and the corrupt, who he contends are oppressing "the people", when in reality this is a ruse in order to exploit Gotham's citizens for the League of Shadows' ultimate goal in destroying the city.
- Marion Cotillard as Miranda Tate / Talia al Ghul:
  The current CEO of Wayne Enterprises who encourages a still-grieving Bruce to rejoin society and continue his father's philanthropic works but is later revealed to be the daughter of Ra's al Ghul and Bane's accomplice. Cotillard also does her own dub-over voice in both the European and Canadian French dubs of the film.
  - Joey King as young Talia al Ghul
- Joseph Gordon-Levitt as John Blake:
  A young police officer whose instincts lead him to believe that there is trouble on the horizon. He is promoted to detective by Gordon when the elder cop sees his honesty and dedication to the city. As an orphaned child, he briefly met Bruce Wayne and deduced the billionaire's secret identity. Blake represents the idealism that Gordon and Bruce once held, but soon lost in their battle against crime in the city. The film reveals his legal name to be Robin John Blake, a homage to Batman's sidekick in the comics, Robin.
- Morgan Freeman as Lucius Fox:
  The ex-CEO turned executive vice president of Wayne Enterprises, who runs the company on Wayne's behalf and serves as his armorer for the Batsuit, providing him with high-tech equipment and discreetly developing cutting-edge technology and weaponry, even as Wayne Enterprises starts losing money.
- Matthew Modine as Peter Foley: Gordon's second-in-command who disdains Batman.
- Ben Mendelsohn as John Daggett: A billionaire industrialist and business rival of Bruce Wayne who employs Bane in a plot to take control of Wayne Enterprises.
- Burn Gorman as Philip Stryver: Daggett's assistant and senior executive vice president of Daggett Industries. Philip Stryver is named after Stryver from A Tale of Two Cities, the novel that The Dark Knight Rises directly drew influence from.
- Néstor Carbonell as Anthony Garcia: Gotham City's mayor. Carbonell reprises his role from The Dark Knight.
- Juno Temple as Jen: Selina Kyle's friend and accomplice.
- Josh Stewart as Barsad: Bane's right-hand man.
- Alon Aboutboul as Dr. Leonid Pavel: A Russian nuclear physicist who is kidnapped by Bane and the League of Shadows in order to convert a fusion reactor funded by Bruce Wayne and Miranda Tate into a weapon to be used for the destruction of Gotham City.
- Aidan Gillen as Bill Wilson: (Note: Bill Wilson is referred to solely as "CIA" in the film's dialogue; the character's name is revealed in the film's novelization.) A CIA operative who was tasked with extracting Pavel from Uzbekistan and tracking down Bane for terrorist activities before his appearance in Gotham City.
- Brett Cullen as Byron Gilley: A U.S. congressman who is kidnapped by Kyle. Brett Cullen would go on to portray Thomas Wayne in the 2019 DC Comics adaptation Joker.
- Chris Ellis as Father Reilly: A priest at the orphanage in which Blake grew up.
- Tom Conti as an unnamed prisoner who serves as Bruce Wayne's caretaker in Bane's underground prison, the Pit.
- Uri Gavriel as an old blind prisoner in the Pit who gives Bruce Wayne advice to escape successfully.
- Daniel Sunjata as Mark Jones: A U.S. Special Ops officer who leads a task force into Gotham to assist Gordon and the GCPD in freeing the city from Bane's rule.
- Liam Neeson as Ra's al Ghul: The former leader of the League of Shadows and Bruce Wayne's former mentor, who appears in a cameo and a brief flashback. Neeson reprises his role from Batman Begins.
  - Josh Pence as young Ra's al Ghul. He appears in scenes set thirty years before the events of Batman Begins.
- Cillian Murphy as Dr. Jonathan Crane / Scarecrow: A former psychopharmacologist and criminal who presides over proletarian kangaroo courts during Bane's takeover of Gotham City. Murphy reprises his role from Batman Begins and The Dark Knight.
- India Wadsworth as the wife of Ra's al Ghul and the mother of Talia al Ghul.
- John Nolan as Douglas Fredericks: A board member of Wayne Enterprises. John Nolan is Christopher Nolan's uncle and he reprises his role from Batman Begins.
- William Devane as the President of the United States.

Other cast members include Rob Brown, Brent Briscoe, Will Estes and Desmond Harrington as police officers; Christopher Judge as one of Bane's henchmen; and Noel Gugliemi as an ex-prisoner who is in charge of exiling corrupt elites during Bane's revolution. Thomas Lennon, who had appeared as a doctor in Nolan's 2000 film Memento, again plays a doctor. Glen Powell makes a pre-fame appearance as a stock exchange trader that gets knocked out by Bane.

United States Senator Patrick Leahy, who had made a cameo appearance in The Dark Knight, returned in The Dark Knight Rises, as a Wayne Enterprises board member.

Several members of the Pittsburgh Steelers have cameo appearances as members of the fictional Gotham Rogues football team in the film, including Ben Roethlisberger, Hines Ward, Troy Polamalu, Willie Colon, Maurkice Pouncey, Mike Wallace, Heath Miller, Aaron Smith, Ryan Clark, James Farrior, LaMarr Woodley, and Casey Hampton, and former Steelers head coach Bill Cowher as the head coach of the Rogues. Pittsburgh mayor Luke Ravenstahl, a kicker in college, appears as the kicker for the Rogues' opponents, the Rapid City Monuments.

Aaron Eckhart expressed enthusiasm in returning for a sequel if asked, although he later stated Nolan verified that his character, Harvey Dent / Two-Face, was dead, and only archive footage of Eckhart from The Dark Knight appears in the film.

== Production ==
=== Development ===
"The key thing that makes the third film a great possibility for us is that we want to finish our story [...] rather than infinitely blowing up the balloon and expanding the story [...] Unlike the comics, these things don't go on forever in film and viewing it as a story with an end is useful. Viewing it as an ending, that sets you very much on the right track about the appropriate conclusion."

— Christopher Nolan, confirming his involvement in The Dark Knight Rises.

In 2005, David S. Goyer confirmed that he wrote treatments for two Batman Begins (2005) sequels involving the Joker; the first would involve Batman, Harvey Dent and Commissioner Gordon hunting the Joker, while the second would have the Joker scarring Dent and turning him into Two-Face during his trial. The third treatment ended in the same way as the final version of The Dark Knight Rises. Other aspects of the third treatment were incorporated into The Dark Knight (2008). However, Heath Ledger's family stated that he was planning on reprising his role as the Joker before his death, a notion supported by Ledger's co-star Aaron Eckhart, who portrayed Two-Face in that film. A deleted subplot from The Dark Knight involved Michael Jai White's Gambol surviving his encounter with the Joker to enable Jai White's character to return in a future film to try to take Gotham City over, but these plans were scrapped after Ledger's death and the film was edited to delete Gambol's subplot and have him killed off in the scene where the Joker originally simply mutilated him. After Ledger's death, director Christopher Nolan decided not to recast the role out of respect for his performance, and was initially hesitant to make a third film.

Warner Bros. president of production Jeff Robinov had hoped a third film would be released in 2011 or 2012. Nolan wanted the story for the third installment to keep him emotionally invested. "On a more superficial level, I have to ask the question," he reasoned, "how many good third movies in a franchise can people name?" Nolan said that he never even thought a third film was possible in the foreword for his book The Art and Making of the Dark Knight Trilogy. Nolan only agreed to a third film based on finding a worthwhile story, fearing that he would become bored halfway through production if he discovered the film to be unnecessary. By December 2008, Nolan completed a rough story outline, before he committed himself to Inception (2010). Later in December, Alan F. Horn confirmed that while discussions with Nolan about a third film were ongoing, no casting had been done, and Horn denied all such rumors. Before Nolan confirmed his involvement, Gary Oldman had said he was confident Nolan would return.

Following the success of the Joker in The Dark Knight, studio executives wished for the Riddler to be included as the primary villain as he was considered a similar character and encouraged the casting of Leonardo DiCaprio, while Robin Williams expressed interest. However, Nolan wanted the antagonist to be vastly different from the previous incarnations and committed to using Bane instead, citing the need for a character with a physical presence within the film. He was initially unfamiliar with the character's backstory, but pointed out the appeal of an archetype, labeling it as "the extreme of some type of villainy". When comparing the choice of Bane with the Joker, Nolan highlighted the Joker as an example of "diabolical, chaotic anarchy and has a devilish sense of humor", juxtaposing him against Bane, whom he likened to "a classic movie monster [...] with a terrific brain." Nolan has said that his draft of the script was inspired by Charles Dickens's 1859 novel A Tale of Two Cities, which centers around the French Revolution. This homage to Dickens was briefly illustrated by having Bane inconspicuously finger knit paracord in the film, symbolizing Madame Defarge, the villain of A Tale of Two Cities, and more overtly by Commissioner Gordon's eulogy for Bruce Wayne, which is taken directly from Dickens's novel.

On February 9, 2010, it was announced that Nolan had "cracked" the story and was committed to returning to the project. Shortly afterward, it was announced David S. Goyer and Nolan's brother Jonathan were working on a screenplay. Goyer would leave the project during pre-production to begin work on Man of Steel (2013); Jonathan continued writing the script based on the story by Christopher and Goyer. Christopher Nolan said that Jonathan's original draft was about 400 pages. The film's storyline was compared to the Batman comic book series' story arc "Knightfall" (1993), which showcases Bane; the miniseries The Dark Knight Returns (1986), in which Batman returns to Gotham City after a ten-year absence; and the story arc "No Man's Land" (1999), which depicts a Gotham cut off from the rest of the world and overrun by gangs. The nickname "the Dark Knight" was first applied to Batman in Batman #1 (1940), in a story written by Bill Finger.

Nolan confirmed the Joker would not return in the third film, and dismissed rumors that he considered using unused footage of Ledger from The Dark Knight. The Dark Knight Rises reunited Nolan with many of his past collaborators, including cinematographer Wally Pfister, production designer Nathan Crowley, editor Lee Smith, costume designer Lindy Hemming, special effects supervisors Paul Franklin and Chris Corbould, and composer Hans Zimmer. Zoë Kravitz attempted to audition for a role in the film, but she was rejected for being "too urban". She would later go on to play Catwoman in the 2022 film The Batman.

=== Filming ===
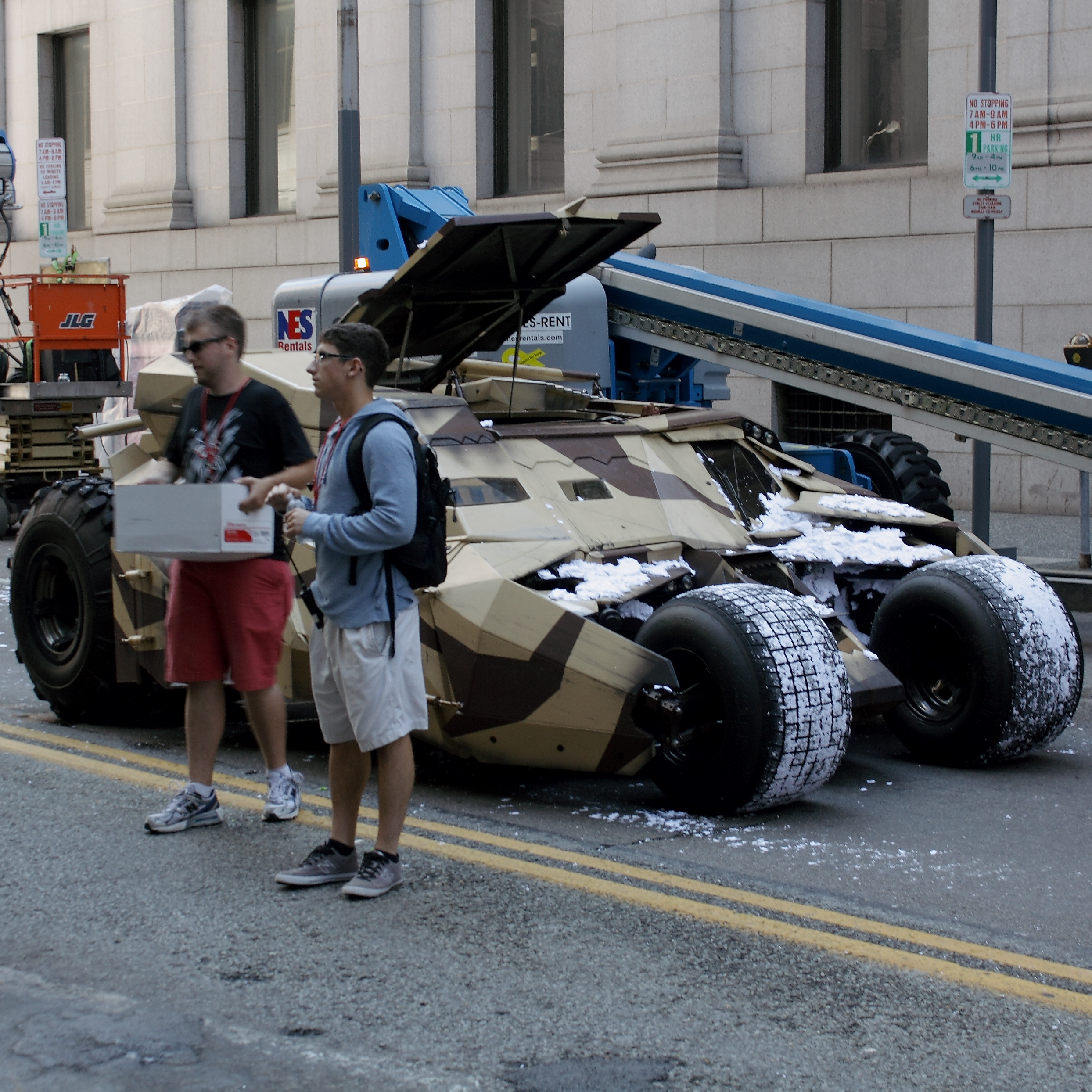
A Tumbler on the set of The Dark Knight Rises in Pittsburgh

During location scouting in December 2010, Nolan began searching for locations such as India, Romania, and Michigan. According to the Romania Insider, Nolan was interested in Bucharest's historical centers, Edgar Quinet Street, the Palace of the Parliament, and the Turda salt mine. The film had an estimated budget of $250–300 million, coming down to about $230 million after tax credits. Nolan elected not to film in 3-D, but instead stated that he intended to focus on improving image quality and scale using the IMAX format. The Dark Knight Rises featured over an hour of footage shot in IMAX (by comparison, The Dark Knight contained 28 minutes). Nolan had several meetings with IMAX Vice-president David Keighley to work on the logistics of projecting films in digital IMAX venues.

Wally Pfister had expressed interest in shooting the film entirely in IMAX, but because of the considerable noise made by IMAX cameras, 35 mm and 70 mm cameras had to be used for shooting the film's dialogue scenes, as dialogue had to be dubbed when shot with IMAX cameras. Chairman and president of the IMAX Corporation Greg Foster stated that IMAX planned to run the film in its theatres for two months, despite only being contractually committed to run the film for two weeks. Nolan also bypassed the use of a digital intermediate for the film, resulting in less manipulation of the filmed image and higher film resolution.

Filming was scheduled to start in May and conclude in November 2011. Principal photography commenced on May 6, 2011, in Jodhpur, India, at the Mehrangarh Fort before moving to Pittsburgh, where it operated under the ruse title Magnus Rex to reduce the visibility of the production. Shooting locations within the city included Heinz Field, the site of an American football game, with members of the Pittsburgh Steelers playing the Gotham Rogues football team. More than 11,000 extras were used to depict the shot sequence. Filming in Pittsburgh also took place at the Mellon Institute and Software Engineering Institute at Carnegie Mellon University. A letter sent out to residents and business owners detailing road closures revealed that the streets of the city would be featured "as the start of [the] film". 9-1-1 operators were told to expect an increase in calls related to gunshots and explosions in the film's production.

The Pittsburgh leg of production wrapped after three weeks on August 21, 2011. The next portion of the filming began in Los Angeles in late August and finished up on October 23 after nine weeks of filming. New York and New Jersey were the next places of filming. The Trump Tower replaced the Richard J. Daley Center as the location for the headquarters of Wayne Enterprises. In November 2011, shooting shifted to Newark, New Jersey. Newark City Hall and Military Park were among the locations used for filming. Other shooting locations include London and Glasgow, the latter of which was used for "additional exterior filming". Principal photography concluded on November 14, 2011. The external waterfall scene at the end of the film was shot at Sgwd Henrhyd falls, on the edge of the Brecon Beacons National Park in Wales.

Production photos from filming in Pittsburgh showed a second Tumbler chassis after the first was destroyed, indicating that a new Batmobile would be in the film, following the destruction of the first in The Dark Knight. Further set photos revealed a "new vehicle" being transported to Wabash Tunnel, prompting speculation as to its nature. In June 2011, Autoblog confirmed the presence of the new Lamborghini Aventador on the film set.

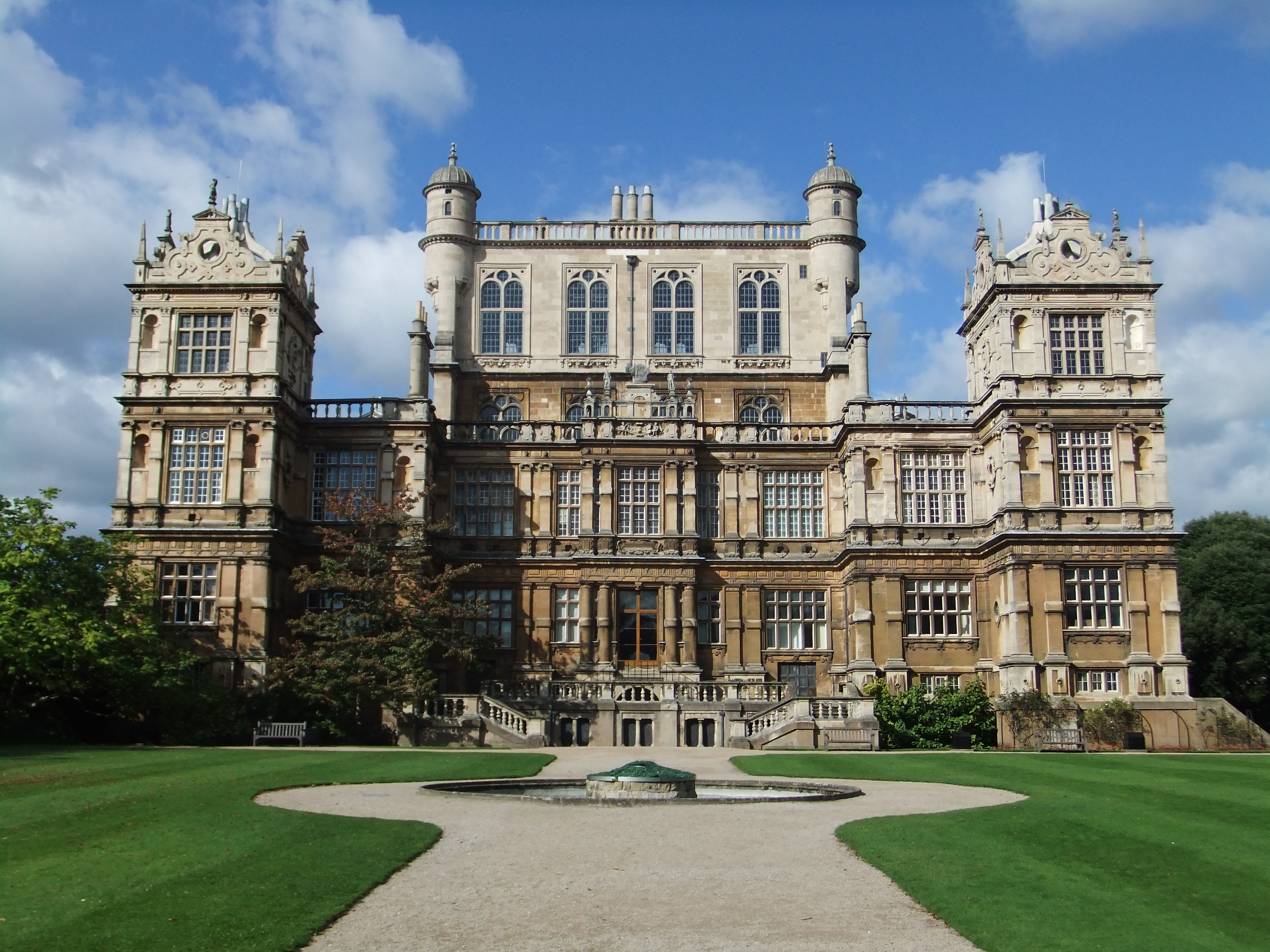
Wollaton Hall in Nottingham was used as Wayne Manor, Bruce Wayne's residence.

Several accidents occurred during the production of the film. While filming at Wollaton Hall, Nottingham, a tractor-trailer crashed into the main entrance, though no one was injured. A stuntman parachutist later crashed through the roof of a home in Cairngorm Gliding Club, Feshiebridge in Scotland, and became wedged there after a failed landing during a skydiving stunt; he was not seriously injured. While filming scenes in Pittsburgh, Hathaway's stunt double crashed into an IMAX camera while filming a sequence that required her to ride a Batpod down a flight of stairs during a riot. There were no injuries, but the camera was destroyed. A second accident took place in Pittsburgh when the truck carrying the then-unidentified vehicle later termed "the Bat" went off-course and crashed into a lighting array, damaging the model of the aircraft. Production was delayed while the model was repaired.

Shortly before Christmas of 2011, Nolan invited several prominent directors, including Edgar Wright, Michael Bay, Bryan Singer, Jon Favreau, Eli Roth, Duncan Jones and Stephen Daldry, to Universal CityWalk's IMAX theatre for a private screening of the first six minutes of The Dark Knight Rises, which had been shot on IMAX film and edited from the original camera negative. Nolan, feeling that the use of film stock in cinema was being phased out due to the introduction of digital cinematography and projection, used this screening to make a case for the continued use of film, which he asserts still offers superior image quality to any digital format, and warned the filmmakers that unless they continued to assert their choice to use film in their productions, they may eventually lose it as an option. Nolan explained, "I wanted to give them a chance to see the potential, because I think IMAX is the best film format that was ever invented. It's the gold standard and what any other technology has to match up to, but none have, in my opinion. The message I wanted to put out there was that no one is taking anyone's digital cameras away. But if we want film to continue as an option, and someone is working on a big studio movie with the resources and the power to insist [on] film, they should say so. I felt as if I didn't say anything, and then we started to lose that option, it would be a shame. When I look at a digitally acquired and projected image, it looks inferior against an original negative anamorphic print or an IMAX one."

=== Design ===
==== Costume design ====
A digitally mapped model of Tom Hardy's face and skull was used to design and construct Bane's mask.

Costume designer Lindy Hemming explained that Bane uses a mask to inhale an analgesic gas, which, in Nolan's words, "keeps his pain just below the threshold so he can function." In designing Bane's costume, Hemming needed it to look "like an amalgam of all sorts of bits and pieces he cobbled together, as he passed through some very remote places. We made parts of his vest, for example, from fragments of an old military tent. His clothes are militaristic, but are not in any way a uniform." Hemming also designed Bane's mask to look "animalistic". Costume effects supervisor Graham Churchyard created a three-dimensional model of actor Tom Hardy's face and skull to design the mask, allowing the mask to perfectly conform to the contours of Hardy's face. Hemming personally designed Bane's coat, which took two years to complete. Taking inspiration from a Swedish army jacket and a frock coat from the French Revolution, it was designed to make Bane look equal parts dictatorial and revolutionary. The design was difficult as Hemming struggled to find a tailor in Los Angeles who could work with shearling.

The Batsuit consisted of 110 separate pieces, each of which had to be replicated dozens of times over the course of the production. The base layer was made of a polyester mesh that is used by the military and high-tech sports manufacturers because of its breathability and moisture-wicking properties. Molded pieces of flexible urethane were then attached to the mesh, to form the overall body armor plating. Carbon fiber panels were placed inside the sections on the legs, chest and abdomen. The cowl was sculpted from a cast of Christian Bale's head to become a perfect fit for Bale. The suit remained unchanged for the film since The Dark Knight.

In creating Selina Kyle's catsuit, two layers of material were used, the outer layer being polyurethane-coated spandex embossed with a hexagonal pattern. The catsuit also consisted of elbow-length gloves, a utility belt, and thigh-high boots with spike heels.

==== Production design ====
Concept artist Tully Summers commented on Nolan's style of cinematography when asked about the difference between his designs for this film and fantasy-based designs for Men in Black 3 (2012): "The difference for me was Christopher Nolan's visual style. One of the things that makes his Batman movies so compelling is their tone of plausibility. He will often prefer a raw, grittier design over one that is very sleek and product design pretty. It's sort of a practical military aesthetic. This stuff is made to work, not impress shoppers. The Dark Knight Rises is a war film." Producer Emma Thomas stated that The Dark Knight Rises has a different visual aesthetic from the first two Nolan-directed features, explaining that "it's meant to be winter in Gotham, so that right there is going to lend a whole different look to the film."

The film introduces a vehicle that has been compared with the Batplane and the Batcopter, dubbed "the Bat". In designing the Bat, Nathan Crowley approached it as if it were an actual military project, emphasising the need for it to "fit into the same family" as the Tumbler and the Batpod. The final version of the Bat takes its design cues from the Harrier jump jet, Bell Boeing V-22 Osprey and the Boeing AH-64 Apache. Chris Corbould described the Bat's size and shape as presenting a major challenge for filming given Christopher Nolan's emphasis on practical effects over computer-generated imagery. In order to make the Bat "fly", it was variously supported by wires, suspended from cranes and helicopters, and mounted on a purpose-built vehicle with hydraulic controls to simulate movement.

When designing the Batcave set, Crowley and fellow production designer Kevin Kavanaugh hit upon the idea of flooding the Batcave and having Batman's equipment, the Batsuit and a supercomputer rise from the water. Another set was designed at Cardington as an "underground prison", a rough-hewn labyrinth of stone cells in a vast abyss with a 120 foot (37 m) vertical shaft leading to the surface. Exteriors above the prison were filmed in Jodhpur, India, chosen because the "forbidding landscape added to the desolation".

== Music ==
In an interview in October 2010, composer Hans Zimmer confirmed that he would be returning to score The Dark Knight Rises. James Newton Howard was offered to return and write the score with Zimmer as he did for Batman Begins and The Dark Knight, but he chose not to because he noted that the chemistry established between Zimmer and Nolan during the making of Inception would make him seem like a "third wheel". Zimmer included several cues from the earlier scores but explained that he wanted to go in a "completely different direction" for Bane's theme.

The film features a prevalent chant of the phrase "Deshi Basara". In November 2011, Zimmer crowdsourced online audio recordings of the chant to be used in the film's score. When asked about the chant for clarification, Zimmer said, "The chant became a very complicated thing because I wanted hundreds of thousands of voices, and it's not so easy to get hundreds of thousands of voices. So, we tweeted and we posted on the internet, for people who wanted to be part of it. It seemed like an interesting thing. We've created this world, over these last two movies, and somehow I think the audience and the fans have been part of this world. We do keep them in mind."

Like Batman Begins and The Dark Knight, the film's main theme consists of just two notes repeated, representing Batman's pain and guilt. Many times is also reprised in small parts "Molossus", Batman's main action theme in the trilogy.

== Marketing ==
The official website launched in May 2011, introducing a viral marketing campaign similar to the one used to promote The Dark Knight. The website streamed an encrypted audio file described by users as chanting. Users decrypted the audio to the Twitter hashtag, "#TheFireRises". Warner Bros. removed a pixel from the webpage for every tweet using the hashtag. The website revealed the first official image of Bane.

In July 2011, a teaser trailer leaked online before its official release with Harry Potter and the Deathly Hallows – Part 2. The studio released the teaser three days after the leak. The trailer received mixed responses; Stephen Spencer Davis of Slate wrote that it successfully built hype, while Kofi Outlaw of Screen Rant showed disappointment, claiming it was more of an "announcement trailer" than an actual teaser trailer. Outlaw criticized the quality, writing that a scene depicting Commissioner Gordon in a hospital bed was overly dramatic, had "hammy" dialogue, and was difficult to understand due to Gordon's labored breathing. Outlaw wrote that the sweeping shot of Gotham City had poor CGI and was too reminiscent of the Inception trailer. The theatrical trailer leaked online, like the teaser trailer, before being released the following week attached to theatrical prints of Sherlock Holmes: A Game of Shadows. Critics noted political undertones with dialogue foreshadowing the theme of income inequality and what they consider an "Occupy Gotham" campaign within the world of the story. Receiving more than 12.5 million views in the first 24 hours after its release, the trailer set the record for most combined downloads from iTunes, beating the previous record held by The Avengers. However, the second trailer for The Avengers again set the record with 13.7 million downloads. Warner Bros. attached a second theatrical trailer for The Dark Knight Rises to theatrical prints of The Avengers. An "unnamed" Warner Brothers executive clarified that "We see this placement as a good strategic decision. We always want our trailers to be seen with films that people want to see—and a lot of people will be going to The Avengers!" The executive also commented that the trailer will "provide the best potential exposure for TDKR." Warner Bros. released the trailer online on April 30, 2012, approximately four days before they attached it to theatrical prints of The Avengers.

Continuing a method used with The Dark Knight whereby the opening sequence of the film was attached to IMAX prints of I Am Legend (2007) seven months before release, a six-minute prologue of The Dark Knight Rises was attached to 70mm IMAX prints of Mission: Impossible – Ghost Protocol, again approximately seven months before release. Critical reaction to the prologue was positive. Addressing the issue in an interview with Entertainment Weekly, Nolan said "I think when people see the film, things will come into focus. Bane is very complex and very interesting and when people see the finished film people will be very entertained by him."

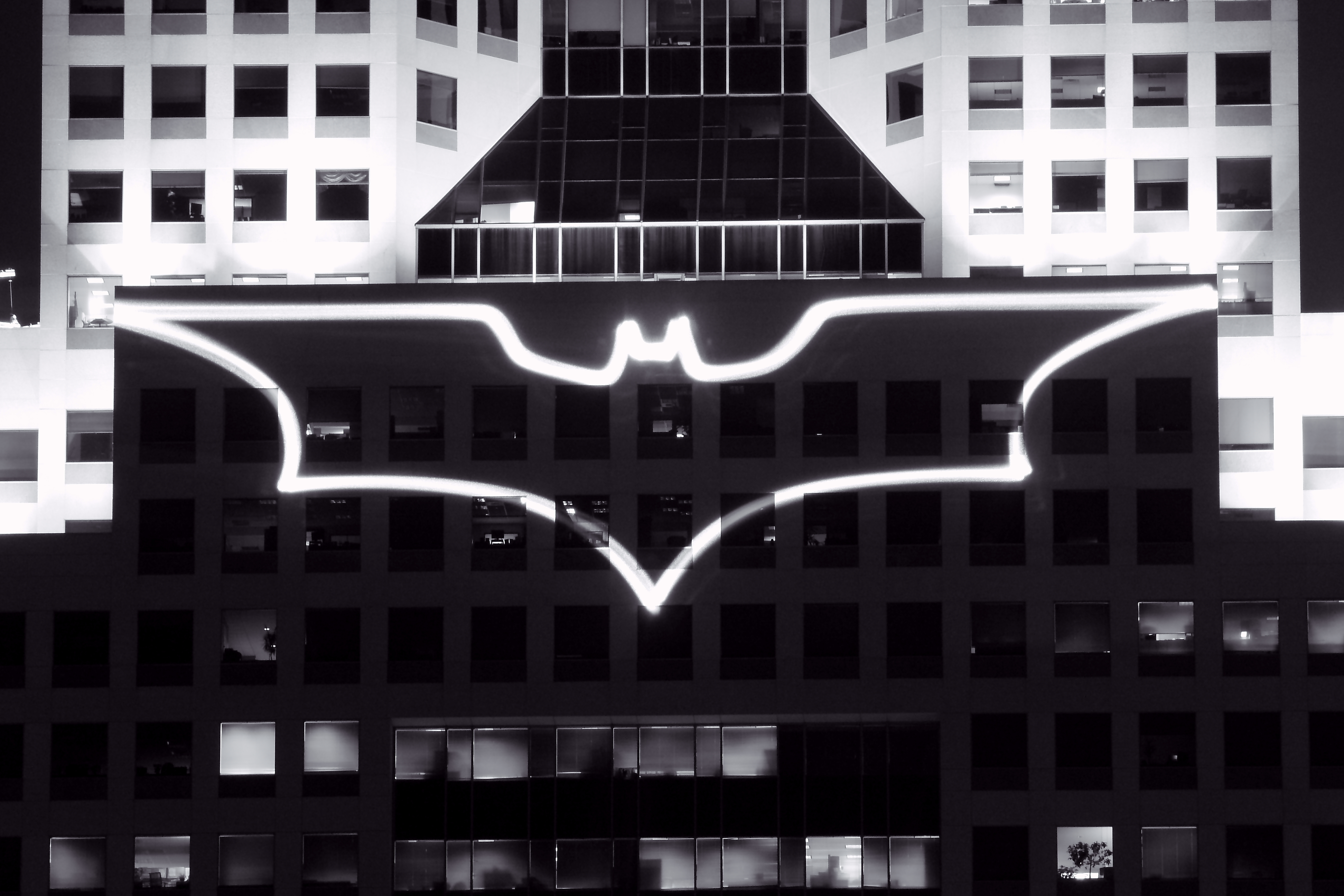
The Bat-Signal being projected against the Fifth Avenue Place during filming in Pittsburgh

Viral marketing campaigns for the film continued as magazine companies Empire and Wired received "CIA documents" concerning a "Dr. Leonid Pavel", with its mugshot connected to actor Alon Abutbul. According to the first document, Pavel is a missing Russian nuclear physicist, while the second document appears to be an edited transcript of a conversation discussing the handover of Dr. Pavel to the CIA by Georgian separatists, but with most of the conversation redacted. These were later shown to be plot elements of the six-minute prologue. The official Twitter account later linked to another censored document, this time, referencing "Operation Early Bird". A website of the same name was discovered, revealing a countdown timer. When the countdown finished, the site presented a map showing all available theaters that would be screening the film's prologue earlier than its release.

Various websites received a package that included a cylinder map of "strike zones", and a "fire rises" T-shirt. In April 2012, the film's official website was updated with a "dossier" on a suspect named "John Doe" also known as "the Batman" for an arrest, with a list of several accusations. The premise of the campaign starts when the mayor of Gotham City "redoubles" the effort to capture Batman and anyone supporting his return in preparation for the upcoming "Harvey Dent Day". The site also includes an extensive list of real-world locations where "graffiti related to movement in support of the vigilante's return" is located. For each tweet of a specific location marked on the list, a frame of the second theatrical trailer for the film was released on a separate website.

In January 2012, six months prior to the film's release, tickets for midnight IMAX showings in New York, San Francisco, and Los Angeles went on sale and sold out immediately. Purchased tickets surfaced for sale online for over $100, compared with their original price of $17.50.

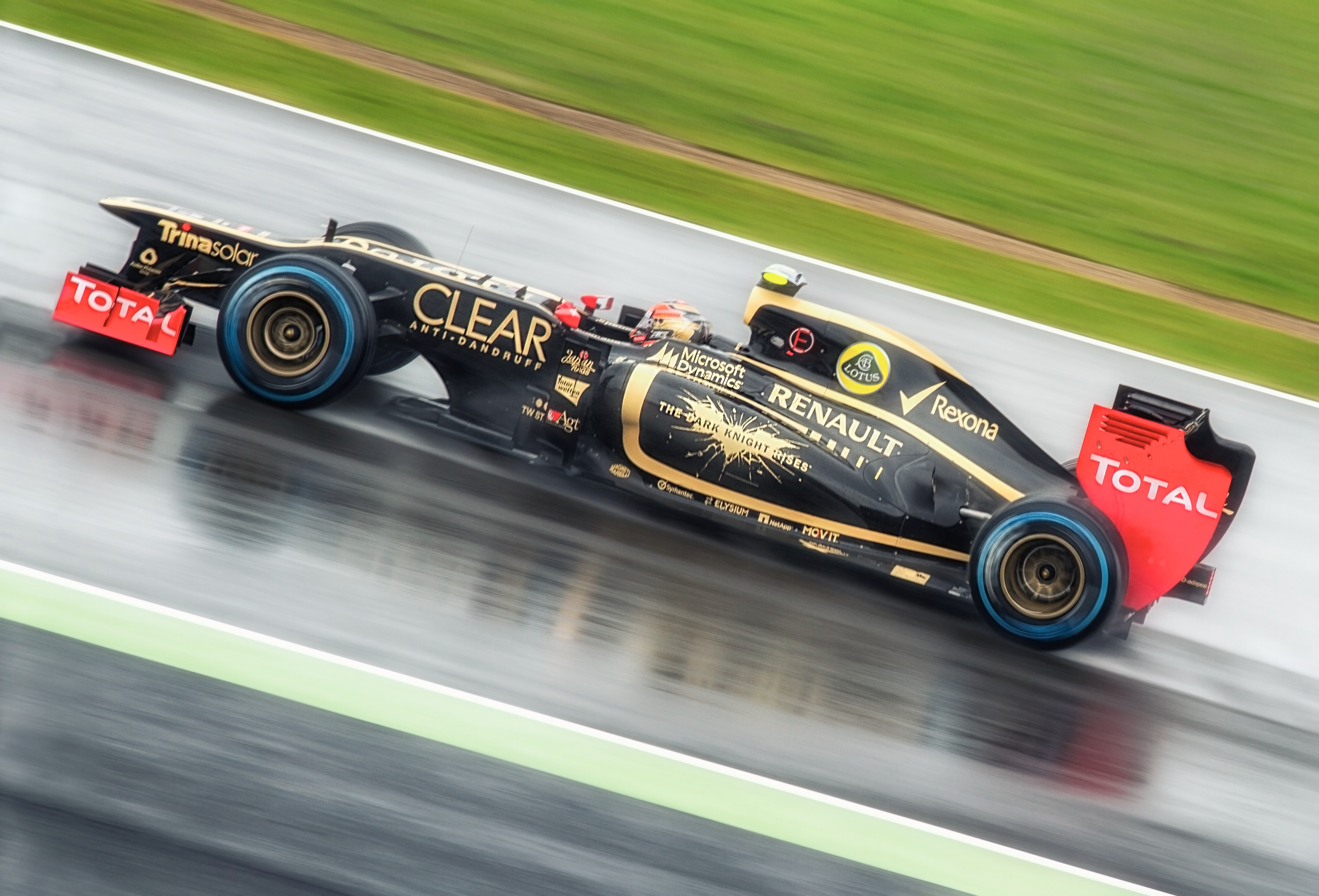
Formula One team Lotus F1 carrying a special livery to promote The Dark Knight Rises at the 2012 British Grand Prix

At the American International Toy Fair, Mattel unveiled figures for Batman, Bane, Catwoman, and Batman's flying vehicle, the Bat. The Mattel figures were also released in the "Movie Masters" line, featuring more highly detailed and articulated presentation, and Quiktek versions that feature interchangeable accessories. Lego released building sets and mini-figures based on the film and incorporating other DC Comic characters. Additionally, Funko released a series of plush toys, Mezco Toyz released vinyl figures, and Hornby released the Batman Tumbler car. Other partners include Jakks Pacific, who created novelty and large-scale figures and plush toys, and PPW Toys, who created a Batman themed Mr. Potato Head. Various clothing items including shoes, T-shirts, hats and wallets were also produced.

The film novelization, written by author Greg Cox and published by Titan Books, was released alongside the film on July 24, 2012.

Warner Bros. partnered with Mountain Dew to do a cross-promotion that included a special paint scheme on the number 88 Chevrolet Impala owned by Hendrick Motorsports and driven by Dale Earnhardt Jr. in the NASCAR Sprint Cup Series. On June 17, 2012, the car won the 2012 Quicken Loans 400 at Michigan International Speedway. On July 4, 2012, the studio signed a deal with Formula One team Lotus F1 to have the film's logos appear on the Lotus E20s driven by Kimi Räikkönen and Romain Grosjean at the 2012 British Grand Prix. Räikkönen and Grosjean went on to finish the race in fifth and sixth place respectively. Warner Bros. had previously followed a similar promotion at the 2008 British Grand Prix, when the now-defunct Toyota F1 carried a livery to promote The Dark Knight.

== Derivative works ==
Two digital comic books entitled Batman Origins and The Dark Knight: Prologue were released exclusively for Nokia Lumia devices. A special movie application was also released, featuring trailers, wallpapers, movie schedules and Batman trivias. Limited editions of the Lumia 710, Lumia 800 and Lumia 900 were also released featuring a laser-etched Batman logo.

A video game of the same name was released on the same day as the release of the film for the iOS and Android devices for promoting the movie. It was made by Gameloft. The game features an open world with primary focus on stealth and combat. The combat system of the game is inspired from Batman: Arkham Asylum (2009) and Arkham City (2011). It takes place in Gotham City, with a somewhat similar but still significantly different plot from that of the movie. The game's average Metacritic score is 64 out of 100. IGN gave it a mediocre score of 5.5/10.

== Release ==
On July 6, 2012, Warner Bros. Pictures held a special IMAX screening of The Dark Knight Rises for more than one hundred reporters and critics. However, technical issues with the computer device synchronizing the sound and picture forced the studio to postpone the screening by a day. The film later premiered on July 16 at the AMC Lincoln Square Theater in New York City, followed by a European premiere on July 18 at Leicester Square in London, England. The film was released in Australia and New Zealand on July 19, and was later released in North America and the United Kingdom on July 20.

=== Colorado shooting ===
"I would not presume to know anything about the victims of the shooting but that they were there last night to watch a movie. I believe movies are one of the great American art forms and the shared experience of watching a story unfold on screen is an important and joyful pastime. The movie theatre is my home, and the idea that someone would violate that innocent and hopeful place in such an unbearably savage way is devastating to me. Nothing any of us can say could ever adequately express our feelings for the innocent victims of this appalling crime, but our thoughts are with them and their families."

— Director Christopher Nolan's reaction to the theater shooting in Aurora, Colorado.

On July 20, 2012, during a midnight showing of The Dark Knight Rises at the Century 16 cinema in Aurora, Colorado, a 24-year-old gunman wearing a gas mask opened fire inside the theater, killing 12 people and injuring 58 others. Police responding to the shooting apprehended a suspect, later identified as 24-year-old James Eagan Holmes, shortly after arriving on the scene. Initial reports stated that Holmes identified himself as "the Joker" at the time of his arrest, although this has been debunked.

Warner Bros. cancelled the Paris, Mexico, and Japan premieres of The Dark Knight Rises, and suspended the film's marketing campaign in Finland. Several broadcast networks also suspended television ads for the film in the United States. The trailer for Gangster Squad, another Warner Bros. movie included in the screening of The Dark Knight Rises, was removed as it contains a scene which shows gangsters shooting submachine guns at moviegoers through the screen, similar to the shooting in Aurora.

Nolan released a public statement calling the shooting "unbearably savage". Other stars of the film released statements expressing their condolences, with Christian Bale paying a personal visit to the survivors and the memorial in Aurora.

=== Home media ===
The Dark Knight Rises was released on November 28, 2012, in Hong Kong and New Zealand. On December 3, it was released in the United Kingdom, and on December 4, it was released in the United States. It is available on Blu-ray, DVD, and as a digital download. Coinciding with the release of this film, a box set of The Dark Knight Trilogy was released. The Dark Knight Rises film was released on 4K UHD Blu-ray on December 19, 2017.

== Reception ==
=== Box office ===
Hours before the midnight release of the film, several box-office analysts suggested as much as a $198 million domestic opening weekend. However, in the wake of the mass shooting during a midnight screening of the film, Warner Bros. decided to not report further box-office figures for the movie until Monday, July 23, 2012. As a result, other distributors also delayed the release of their official estimates as well. The shooting is also speculated to have hurt the ticket sales as E! Online reported that a North Carolina audience member had stated that "this theater was kinda empty". Some reports released on July 21, 2012, said that rival studios estimated that the film grossed $75 million to $77 million on its opening day. Warner Bros. shortly after released a statement to ABC News stating that they delayed the release of their estimates for the opening day total of the film "out of respect for the victims and their families," and added "Warner Bros. Pictures will not be reporting box office numbers for The Dark Knight Rises throughout the weekend. Box office numbers will be released on Monday."

The Dark Knight Rises earned $448.1 million in North America, and $632.9 million in other countries, summing up to a worldwide total of $1.085 billion. Worldwide, it became the seventh-highest-grossing film of all time and the third-highest-grossing film of 2012. It had a worldwide opening weekend of $248.9 million. The film set a worldwide IMAX opening-weekend record with $23.8 million (overtaken by Avengers: Age of Ultron in 2015) and also broke the record for the fastest movie to make over $50 million in IMAX theatres. IMAX CEO Richard L. Gelfond explained this by claiming, "Audiences are clearly seeking out and embracing the film the way it was meant to be seen – in IMAX." On the 2012 Labor Day weekend, it became the third film distributed by Warner Bros. and the thirteenth film in cinematic history to cross the $1 billion mark. The film also became the second movie (after Avatar) to reach $100 million in worldwide IMAX grosses.

==== North America ====
The Dark Knight Rises opened on Friday, July 20, 2012. It earned an estimated $30.6 million in midnight showings, which was the second-highest midnight gross behind Harry Potter and the Deathly Hallows – Part 2 ($43.5 million). It did, however, set an IMAX midnight-gross record with $2.3 million (overtaken by Avengers: Age of Ultron). The film made $75.8 million during its opening day, achieving, at the time, the third-highest single and opening day tally of all time. On July 23, 2012, it was announced that the film grossed $160.9 million for its debut weekend, which was the third-highest opening weekend ever, at the time, behind The Avengers ($207.4 million) and Deathly Hallows – Part 2 ($169.2 million). However, it did set an opening-weekend record for a 2D film (previously held by The Dark Knight). The film also held the top spot at the box office for its second and third weekends. In North America, it is the thirteenth-highest-grossing film, the third-highest-grossing 2012 film, as well as the sixth-highest-grossing superhero film and film based on comics. Box Office Mojo estimates that the film sold more than 55 million tickets in the US.

==== Other territories ====
Outside North America, the film opened with $88.0 million from 7,173 theaters in just 17 markets. It was in first place at the box office outside North America for four consecutive weekends. Its three largest markets are the UK, Ireland and Malta ($90.3 million), where it is the highest-grossing superhero film, China ($52.8 million) and Australia ($44.2 million).

=== Critical response ===
The Dark Knight Rises received positive reviews from critics. In a Metacritic review of year-end lists from 133 critics, 17 placed the film in their top ten. Film review aggregator Rotten Tomatoes gave The Dark Knight Rises an approval rating of 87% based on 376 reviews, and a rating average of 8/10. The web site's critical consensus reads: "The Dark Knight Rises is an ambitious, thoughtful, and potent action film that concludes Christopher Nolan's franchise in spectacular fashion." Metacritic, another review aggregator, assigned the film a weighted average score of 78 out of 100, based on 45 critics, indicating "generally favorable reviews". CinemaScore reported that audiences gave the film an average grade of "A" on an A+ to F scale.

Robbie Collin of The Daily Telegraph granted the film a maximum score of five stars, stating that it is "a superhero film without a superhero" and praising Hardy's performance as well as the film's intricate plot and narrative. Kenneth Turan of the Los Angeles Times thought the film was "potent, persuasive and hypnotic" and that it was "more than an exceptional superhero movie, it is masterful filmmaking by any standard." Phil Villarreal from OK! magazine gave the film a rating of 1.5 out of 4, calling it "the series' version of The Matrix Revolutions, The Godfather Part III or Caddyshack 2." The Playlist's Todd Gilchrist wrote: "A cinematic, cultural and personal triumph, The Dark Knight Rises is emotionally inspiring, aesthetically significant and critically important for America itself – as a mirror of both sober reflection and resilient hope." IGN gave it a nine out of ten, noting similarities in tone and theme to Batman Begins over the trilogy's second installment, The Dark Knight, but also describing Bane as "that bit less interesting to watch" than Ledger's Joker, despite praising his "menacing voice" and "body language-driven performance".

Film critic Richard Roeper gave the film an "A", calling it "a majestic, gorgeous, brutal and richly satisfying epic", and citing the final scenes of the picture as "the best five minutes of any film this year." The London Film Review gave the film a B and said "Nolan's film is a reminder that superheroes aren't merely a frivolous distraction, but an embodiment of our best selves."

The Guardian scored the film four out of five stars, calling it a film of "granite, monolithic intensity", yet also calling it a "hammy, portentous affair". Andrew O'Hehir of Salon wrote that "if The Dark Knight Rises is a fascist film, it's a great fascist film, and arguably the biggest, darkest, most thrilling and disturbing and utterly balls-out spectacle ever created for the screen". Roger Ebert of the Chicago Sun-Times gave the film three out of four stars, stating that "the film begins slowly with a murky plot and too many new characters, but builds to a sensational climax."

It was selected for the American Film Institute's top 10 films of 2012.

CNN's Tom Charity said that the film was a "disappointingly clunky and bombastic conclusion to a superior series" and called it Nolan's worst film. Anthony Lane of The New Yorker said that the "story is dense, overlong, and studded with references that will make sense only to those intimate with Nolan's previous excursions into Batmanhood". In reaction to fan backlash to some of the negative reviews, Rotten Tomatoes chose to disable user commentary for the film leading up to its release. Some fans had threatened violence against critics while others threatened to take down the websites of movie critics who had given the film a negative review.

=== Analysis ===
Writing in Salon, David Sirota, a progressive political commentator, compared The Dark Knight Rises and the game Call of Duty to 1980s popular culture reflecting the political period of the time, accusing them of perpetuating a conservative agenda: "Just as so many 1980s pop culture products reflected the spirit of the Reagan Revolution's conservative backlash, we are now seeing two blockbuster, genre-shaping products not-so-subtly reflect the Tea Party's rhetorical backlash to the powerful Occupy Wall Street zeitgeist." This supposed conservatism was also noted by Occupy Wall Street leader David Graeber who stated that the film "really is a piece of anti-Occupy propaganda". An article in Variety reported Chuck Dixon, the cocreator of the Bane character, as saying that Bane is "far more akin to an Occupy Wall Street type if you're looking to cast him politically."

Catherine Shoard of the center-left British publication The Guardian said the film "is a quite audaciously capitalist vision, radically conservative, radically vigilante, that advances a serious, stirring proposal that the wish-fulfilment of the wealthy is to be championed if they say they want to do good." In contrast, commentator Jonathan Chait opined in New York that "What passes for a right-wing movie these days is The Dark Knight Rises, which submits the rather modest premise that, irritating though the rich may be, actually killing them and taking all their stuff might be excessive." Writing in USA Today, Bryan Alexander called Bane "the ultimate occupier" and reported that Christian Bale was amazed that the script had "foreseen" the Occupy movement.

Nolan has denied that the film criticizes the Occupy movement, and insists that none of his Batman films are intended to be political: "I've had as many conversations with people who have seen the film the other way round. We throw a lot of things against the wall to see if it sticks. We put a lot of interesting questions in the air, but that's simply a backdrop for the story. What we're really trying to do is show the cracks of society, show the conflicts that somebody would try to wedge open. We're going to get wildly different interpretations of what the film is supporting and not supporting, but it's not doing any of those things. It's just telling a story. If you're saying, 'Have you made a film that's supposed to be criticizing the Occupy Wall Street movement?' – well, obviously, that's not true."

Slovenian philosopher Slavoj Žižek suggested that the film was inspired by the French Revolution as portrayed by novelist Charles Dickens in A Tale of Two Cities.

=== Internet meme ===
In 2011, Aidan Gillen's character in the film, CIA operative Bill Wilson, became the subject of an Internet meme popular among 4chan users known as "Baneposting", which references the dialogue between Wilson and Bane in the film's opening plane scene.

=== Accolades ===
The film received numerous accolades, including a nomination for Special Visual Effects at the British Academy Film Awards, four nominations at the Critics' Choice Awards, two Satellite Awards, five Saturn Awards (winning one), and a Grammy Award. It also received nominations for five Teen Choice Awards (winning one), six MTV Movie Awards and a Kids Choice Award. It was named one of the top-ten films of 2012 by the American Film Institute.

== Proposed sequel ==
Warner Bros. offered Bale and Nolan the chance to make a fourth film, but Bale declined so he could follow Nolan's wishes for a trilogy.

== Bibliography ==
- Kirsch, Konrad (2024). From 'Doodlebug' to 'Oppenheimer'. An Analysis of Christopher Nolan's Film Work. Stuttgart / London: Edition Axel Menges. ISBN 978-3-86905-037-9.
