= The Whole World Lost Its Head =

1994 single by the Go-Go's

Single by the Go-Go's

from the album Return to the Valley of The Go-Go's
- Released: November 1994
- Length: 2:56
- Label: I.R.S.
- Songwriter(s): Kathy Valentine; Jane Wiedlin
- Producer(s): John Porter

The Go-Go's singles chronology
"Cool Jerk" (1990)	"The Whole World Lost Its Head" (1994)	"Unforgiven" (2001)

"The Whole World Lost Its Head" is a song by American rock band the Go-Go's, one of three new songs included on their two-disc retrospective, Return to the Valley of The Go-Go's (1994). The single stalled at number eight on the US Billboard Bubbling Under Hot 100 but became the band's first and only top-40 hit in the UK, peaking at number 29.

The accompanying music video, directed by Roger Avary, cinematographed by Tom Richmond and edited by Sloane Klevin, was shot in the fall of 1994.

The band updated the lyrics for live performances in 2018 and 2025

== Critical reception ==
Larry Flick from Billboard magazine commented, "They're baaaack! Female rock quintet takes satirical look at the world of tabloid television on a pogo-rock rave-up that musically hearkens back to the days of 'We Got the Beat'. Beneath the wicked guitar attack of Charlotte Caffey and Jane Wiedlin lies as a pure a pop ditty as you can get. Belinda Carlisle offers a cheeky sense of irony that pushes the track over the top." Pan-European magazine Music & Media wrote, "Reunited for the compilation CD Return to the Valley of The Go-Go's, the "beach girls" pick up their instruments where they left off when they split up. Great surf punk!" Emma Cochrane from Smash Hits gave "The Whole World Lost Its Head" a score of four out of five, saying, "They're back! What do you mean, "who"? The Go-Go's (Belinda Carlisle's punkette group from almost twenty years ago) have reformed and they're going to kick Shampoo's bottom. They're grandmas with attitude, who can party without irony and make a cracking good pop tune at the same time. More power to them."

== Charts ==
Chart (1994–1995)	Peak position
Europe (Eurochart Hot 100)	84
Scotland (OCC)	26
UK Singles (OCC)	29
US Bubbling Under Hot 100 Singles (Billboard)	8
US Modern Rock Tracks (Billboard)	21

== Release history ==
Region	Date	Format(s)	Label(s)	Ref.
United States	November 1994	CD; cassette	I.R.S.	
United Kingdom	February 6, 1995	7-inch vinyl; CD; cassette	I.R.S.	
Japan	February 17, 1995	Mini-CD	I.R.S.	
