= Yes or No (The Go-Go's song) =

Single by The Go-Go's

from the album Talk Show
- B-side: "Mercenary"
- Released: September 1984
- Recorded: 1983
- Genre: Alternative rock; new wave
- Length: 4:04 (album version); 3:36 (remix version)
- Label: I.R.S.
- Songwriter(s): Jane Wiedlin; Ron Mael; Russell Mael
- Producer(s): Martin Rushent

The Go-Go's singles chronology
"Turn to You" (1984)	"Yes or No" (1984)	"Cool Jerk" (1991)

"Yes or No" is a song by the American rock band the Go-Go's, from their 1984 album Talk Show. The song was co-written by the Go-Go's guitarist Jane Wiedlin and Ron and Russell Mael of the Los Angeles band Sparks.

Wiedlin and Sparks also recorded together in 1983, with Wiedlin providing vocals for two tracks on Sparks' album In Outer Space: album track "Lucky Me, Lucky You" and the band's highest charting U.S. single "Cool Places".

== Track listing ==
7" single (I.R.S. Records – BR-9933)

1. "Yes Or No" (Remix) (Wiedlin, Mael, Mael) – 3:36
2. "Mercenary" (Wiedlin, Valentine, Caffey) – 3:40

== Chart positions ==
Chart (1984)	Peak position
U.S. Billboard Hot 100	84
