= Madagascar 3: Europe's Most Wanted (soundtrack) =

2012 film soundtrack album

Madagascar 3: Europe's Most Wanted (Music from the Motion Picture)

Soundtrack album by Hans Zimmer
- Released: June 5, 2012
- Recorded: 2011–2012
- Genres: Classical; reggae pop; dance pop; hip hop
- Length: 40:25
- Label: Interscope
- Producer: Hans Zimmer

Hans Zimmer chronology
Sherlock Holmes: A Game of Shadows (2011)	Madagascar 3: Europe's Most Wanted (2012)	The Dark Knight Rises (2012)

Madagascar 3: Europe's Most Wanted (Music from the Motion Picture) is the soundtrack album to the 2012 film Madagascar 3: Europe's Most Wanted, the third installment in the Madagascar franchise. The album was released on June 5, 2012 by Interscope Records, and featured original songs and score, produced by Hans Zimmer, who worked on the franchise's previous installments. The album featured popular dance singles, accompanying few original songs written specially for the film.

== Album information ==
In some variations of the soundtrack, "Cool Jerk" is featured in replacement of "We No Speak Americano" by Yolanda Be Cool & DCUP. "Sexy and I Know It" by LMFAO was only used in the theatrical trailer, and not included on the soundtrack and was replaced by "Firework" by Katy Perry for the circus. "Any Way You Want It" by Journey and the instrumental "Watermark" from the album of the same name by Enya were also used, but are not included on the soundtrack. "Land of Hope and Glory" by Edward Elgar appears in the track "Fur Power". The "Afro Circus" tune is from "Entrance of the Gladiators", by the Czech composer Julius Fučík.

== Track listing ==
No.	Title	Artist	Length
1.	"New York City Surprise"	Hans Zimmer	3:06
2.	"Gonna Make You Sweat (Everybody Dance Now)"	Danny Jacobs	2:15
3.	"Wannabe"	Danny Jacobs	2:37
4.	"Game On"	Hans Zimmer	3:12
5.	"Hot in Here"	Danny Jacobs	2:27
6.	"We No Speak Americano"	Yolanda Be Cool & DCUP	4:29
7.	"Light the Hoop on Fire!"	Hans Zimmer	3:10
8.	"Fur Power!"	Hans Zimmer	2:19
9.	"Non Je Ne Regrette Rien"	Frances McDormand	1:13
10.	"Love Always Comes as a Surprise"	Peter Asher	3:21
11.	"Rescue Stefano"	Hans Zimmer	5:51
12.	"Firework"	Katy Perry	3:45
13.	"Afro Circus/I Like to Move It"	Chris Rock & Danny Jacobs	2:41
Total length:			40:26

== Reception ==
The Joy of Movies wrote "this soundtrack is all in good fun and makes for a quite enjoyable ride." James Southall of Movie Wave gave a mixed review to the album, saying "Quite who the rest of the album's meant to appeal to – its curious mix of awful versions of decent songs, decent original recordings of songs and score which spends much of its time referencing other music just doesn't work." James Christopher Monger of AllMusic wrote "Five of the thirteen tracks are Zimmer instrumentals, and while they may not be as memorable as anything from the Lion King, each piece dutifully projects the composer's mastery of the genre." Filmtracks.com wrote "like Madagascar: Escape 2 Africa, a much larger share of score material needed to be included on the commercial album for Madagascar 3: Europe's Most Wanted. The third score may not be as cohesive as the second, but it also deserves better treatment despite its questionable Holkenborg contributions."

== Chart performance ==
The track "Afro Circus/I Like to Move It" peaked at 7 on the ARIA Hitseekers Singles chart on the week commencing October 15, 2012.

Chart (2012)	Peak position
UK Compilation Albums (OCC)	52
UK Digital Albums (OCC)	33
UK Soundtrack Albums (OCC)	26
US Billboard 200	58
US Soundtrack Albums (Billboard)	11

== Accolades ==
Award	Category	Nominated	Result
ASCAP Award	Top Box Office Films	Hans Zimmer	Won
Satellite Award	Best Original Song	"Love Always Comes as a Surprise" – Peter Asher & Dave Stewart	Nominated

== Personnel ==
Credits adapted from Allmusic.

- Slamm Andrews – mixing, music editor
- Laurence Anslow – assistant engineer
- Max Aruj – technical assistance
- Peter Asher – composer, music consultant, producer, soundtrack producer
- Bob Badami – soundtrack producer
- Lorne Balfe – additional music
- Chris Barnett – assistant engineer
- Victoria Beckham – composer
- Charles Brown – composer
- Melanie Brown – composer
- Emma Bunton – composer
- Julie Butchko – music clearance
- Dan Butler – music business affairs
- Renato Carosone – composer
- Lori Castro – mixing assistant
- Melanie Chisholm – composer
- Chuck Choi – technical consultant
- Paul Clarvis – percussion
- Robert Clivillés – composer
- Rupert Coulson – engineer
- DCUP – primary artist
- Ester Dean – composer
- Charles Dumont – composer
- Matt Dunkley – score reader
- Mikkel Storleer Eriksen – composer
- Tom Farnon – score reader
- Geoff Foster – engineer
- Bruce Fowler – supervising orchestrator
- Walt Fowler – orchestration
- Rick Giovinazzo – orchestration
- Gavin Greenaway – score conductor
- Will Greig – technical assistance
- Geri Halliwell – composer
- Matthew Handley – arranger
- Cornell Haynes – composer
- Tor Erik Hermansen – composer
- Stephen Hilton – arranger, producer
- Aleksey Igudesman – soloist
- Danny Jacobs – primary artist
- Kevin Kaska – orchestration
- Andrew Kawczynski – technical assistance
- Gary Kettel – percussion
- Jasha Klebe – arranger
- Daniel Kresco – engineer, mixing
- Duncan Maclennan – arranger
- Frances McDormand – primary artist
- Ladd McIntosh – orchestration
- Liz McNicoll – music business affairs
- Metro Voices – choir/chorus
- Adam Miller – assistant engineer
- Perry Montague-Mason – orchestra leader
- Nils Montan – mixing assistant
- Yvonne S. Moriarty – orchestration
- Erick Morillo – composer
- Ed Neumeister – orchestration
- Katy Perry – composer, primary artist
- Mark Quashie – composer
- Frank Ricotti – percussion
- Chris Rock – composer, primary artist
- Matthew Rowbottom – composer
- Czarina Russell – studio manager
- Nicola Salerno – composer
- Jennifer Schiller – music business affairs
- Sheila E. – soloist
- Andrew Stanley – arranger
- Richard "Biff" Stannard – composer
- Dave Stewart – composer, primary artist
- Jill Streater – librarian
- Pat Sullivan – Mastering
- Ian Thomas – percussion
- Michel Vaucaire – composer
- Jessica Weiss – assistant music editor, backing vocals
- Christian Wenger – assistant engineer
- Lucy Whalley – assistant contractor
- Booker T. White – score preparation
- Sandy Wilhelm – composer
- Freedom Williams – composer
- Pharrell Williams – composer
- Yolanda Be Cool – primary artist
- Andrew Zack – score coordinator
- Hans Zimmer – composer, primary artist, producer, soundtrack producer
