= Turn to You =

Single by The Go-Go's

from the album Talk Show
- B-side: "I'm with You"
- Released: June 1984
- Recorded: 1983
- Genre: Pop rock
- Label: I.R.S.
- Songwriters: Charlotte Caffey, Jane Wiedlin
- Producer: Martin Rushent

The Go-Go's singles chronology
"Head over Heels" (1984)	"Turn to You" (1984)	"Yes or No" (1984)

"Turn to You" is a 1984 single, released by the all-female pop band The Go-Go's. The song was the second single from the band's third album, Talk Show.

Written by Charlotte Caffey and Jane Wiedlin, the song is about Caffey's one-time boyfriend, baseball player Bob Welch.

The song was later included in the jukebox musical Head over Heels that debuted on Broadway in 2018.

== Music video ==
The song's music video, co-directed by Mary Lambert and Chris Gabrin, featured a starring role for the then-up-and-coming actor Rob Lowe. The band members all wear suits (except for drummer Gina Schock, who is wearing a colorful dress) as they perform the song at a formal teen dance which appears to be taking place in the early to mid-1960s. The band members also appear as party guests watching and dancing to the music.

== Chart positions ==
Chart (1984)	Peak position
Canada RPM Top 100 Singles	95
U.S. Billboard Hot 100	32
US Cash Box Top 100	28
