= Brian Dawson (folk singer) =

Brian Dawson (16 August 1939 – 22 November 2013) was a British folk song collector, musician and singer.

He was a member of The Meggies (founders of The Grimsby Folk Club in the 1960s), The Redwings, The Higgeldy Piggeldy Band, The Grimsby Morris Men, The Plowgild Folk Dance Group and The Broadside (with whom he recorded a number of albums). He was an expert in Lincolnshire dialect, and the Lincolnshire folk song collecting of the Australian composer Percy Grainger. He was friends with folklorist and collector Ethel Rudkin, who inspired his interests in folk song and collecting. He helped in organising the Cleethorpes Folk Festival.

== Death ==
During a performance at Howsham Village Hall on 9 November 2013 Dawson collapsed with a heart attack. He died on 22 November 2013, aged 74, at Scunthorpe General Hospital, Scunthorpe, Lincolnshire.

== Collected songs ==
The bulk of Dawson's folk song collection has not yet been published. There are a few references in the Roud Index:

As Collector:

- Roud#944 The Barley Mow
- Roud#346 We're All Jolly Fellows
- Roud#1744 Farmer Giles
- Roud#19111 Johnny Poker

As Performer:

- Roud#126 The Derby Ram

== Publications ==
- Late Leaves From Lincolnshire, co-written with Patrick O'Shaghnessy, Lincolnshire And Humberside Arts (1980), ASIN: B0014AXFM0]
- "The Herring Song", A Prospect of Lincolnshire (eds Naomi Field and Andrew White), Lincoln (1984), p. 126

== Discography ==
- Songs from the Stocks, The Broadside, Guildhall, GHS5 (1970)
- A Collection of Catchpennies, The Broadside, MJB, BEVLP1242 (1970)
- Eastern Approaches, The Residents of the Grimsby Folk Song Club, Guildhall, GHS8 (1973; the Broadside featured on three tracks)
- The Moon Shone Bright, The Broadside, (LP, Album) Topic Records (1973)
- To Drive The Dark Away, The Broadside, (LP, Album) Guildhall (2), Boston Sound Hunters (1975)
- Me 'Umble Lot, Keith Kendrick (CD, Album) Volume One Recordings (1992)
