= Man of Steel (soundtrack) =

Man of Steel: Original Motion Picture Soundtrack

Soundtrack album by Hans Zimmer
- Released: June 11, 2013
- Studios: Eastwood Scoring Stage (Warner Bros.); Newman Scoring Stage (20th Century Fox)
- Genre: Soundtrack
- Length: 85:15
- Labels: WaterTower; Sony Classical
- Producers: Hans Zimmer; Stephen Lipson; Peter Asher

Hans Zimmer chronology
The Dark Knight Rises (2012)	Man of Steel: Original Motion Picture Soundtrack (2013)	The Lone Ranger (2013)

Professional ratings
Review scores
Source	Rating
AllMusic	3.5/5 stars
AvForums	8/10
Filmtracks	1/5 stars
Movie Music UK	1/5 stars
Movie-Wave	1/5 stars
Soundtrackgeek	100/100

Man of Steel: Original Motion Picture Soundtrack is the soundtrack to the film of the same name composed and arranged by Hans Zimmer. It was released on June 11, 2013, by WaterTower Music and Sony Classical Records. The exclusive deluxe edition of the album contains six bonus tracks, entitled "Are You Listening, Clark?", "General Zod", "You Led Us Here", "This Is Madness!", "Earth" and "Arcade".

Hans Zimmer initially denied popular rumors that he would be composing the film's soundtrack, but in June 2012, Zimmer was in fact writing the film's musical score. To completely distinguish Man of Steel from the previous films, the iconic "Superman March" by John Williams is not heard. The musical score from the third trailer, entitled "An Ideal of Hope", was released online for listening purposes on April 19, 2013. This music was a shortened version of the album track "What Are You Going to Do When You Are Not Saving the World?". In late April the same year, the official track listing of the two-disc deluxe edition was revealed.

Popular reception to the score was positive and the album rose to #4 on iTunes during the first week of its release. Critical reception for the score, however, has been polarized. The soundtrack opened at number 9 on the Billboard 200 with 32,000 copies sold.

At the Brit Awards, Zimmer won as "Composer of the Year" for his work on the scores of Man of Steel and The Dark Knight Rises.

== Critical response ==
While popular among fans, the score was polarizing among critics. Some were quite disappointed by the score, citing it as being repetitive, simplistic and over-reliant on drums, while others reacted more positively.

In her review of the film, Ann Hornday, from The Washington Post, called the score "turgid" and "over-produced". Jonathan Broxton of Movie Music UK commended the tracks "Flight" and "What Are You Going to Do When You Are Not Saving the World?" as the best in the soundtrack album, but criticized the lack of development of those themes and the simplicity of the writing: "For [Superman] to be saddled with witless percussion, such predictable string writing, and such a simplistic and repetitive thematic statement is disappointing in the extreme". Christian Clemmensen of Filmtracks.com dismissed the score as a "lowest common denominator" effort, criticizing the excessive use of percussion over other instruments, such as woodwinds or chimes. He concluded by saying: "Ultimately, Zimmer was right. He was the wrong man for this assignment". James Southall, of Movie Wave, cited concerns with the score's over-reliance on a brass effect, dubbed "horn of doom" (made popular with the music from Inception) and wrote: "Man of Steel – the film – may not have the ambition of Inception – but it still has its unique musical needs, and they're just not satisfied".

Conversely, James Christopher Monger, writing for AllMusic, called the soundtrack "grittier and darker than any of its predecessors, due in large part to Zimmer's proclivity for non-stop, thunderous percussion, though it retains enough goose bump-inducing moments to be called a proper Superman score, especially on the elegiac "Look to the Stars" and its soaring counterpart "What Are You Going to Do When You Are Not Saving the World?", both of which dutifully reflect the iconic superhero's propensity for both goodness and might". Chris McEneany of AVForums stated that Zimmer, despite his excessive use of drums, "[came] up with a work that is blistering, beautiful, bold and, I have to say it, brilliant". Jørn Tillnes of Soundtrackgeek gave the score a rave review: "The purists, the soundtrack geeks of old will no doubt hate this score and will use every ounce of their energy to bash it as nothing more than generic droning music. For the rest of us, I believe the new bold direction the Superman franchise is taking is both brilliant and brave. Superman deserves this score and so do you".

== Track listing ==
=== Standard edition ===
All music by Hans Zimmer, except where noted.

Disc 1 – Flight
No.	Title	Length
1.	"Look to the Stars"	2:54
2.	"Oil Rig"	1:31
3.	"Sent Here for a Reason"	3:46
4.	"DNA"	3:18
5.	"Goodbye My Son"	1:57
6.	"If You Love These People"	3:02
7.	"Krypton's Last"	1:58
8.	"Terraforming"	9:46
9.	"Tornado"	2:46
10.	"You Die or I Do"	3:04
11.	"Launch"	2:29
12.	"Ignition"	1:12
13.	"I Will Find Him"	2:57
14.	"This Is Clark Kent"	3:36
15.	"I Have So Many Questions"	3:21
16.	"Flight"	4:09
17.	"What Are You Going to Do When You Are Not Saving the World?"	5:26
Total length:		57:04

Disc 2 – Experiments from the Fortress of Solitude
No.	Title	Length
1.	"Man of Steel" (Hans' Original Sketchbook)	28:11
Total length:		85:15

=== Limited Deluxe edition ===
Disc 1 – Flight
No.	Title	Length
1.	"Look to the Stars"	2:54
2.	"Oil Rig"	1:31
3.	"Sent Here for a Reason"	3:46
4.	"DNA"	3:18
5.	"Goodbye My Son"	1:57
6.	"If You Love These People"	3:02
7.	"Krypton's Last"	1:58
8.	"Terraforming"	9:46
9.	"Tornado"	2:46
10.	"You Die or I Do"	3:04
11.	"Launch"	2:29
12.	"Ignition"	1:12
13.	"I Will Find Him"	2:57
14.	"This Is Clark Kent"	3:36
15.	"I Have So Many Questions"	3:21
16.	"Flight"	4:09
17.	"What Are You Going to Do When You Are Not Saving the World?"	5:26
Total length:		57:04

Disc 2 – Experiments from the Fortress of Solitude
No.	Title	Music	Length
1.	"Man of Steel" (Hans' Original Sketchbook)		28:11
2.	"Are You Listening, Clark?"		2:39
3.	"General Zod"	Hans Zimmer; Junkie XL	7:21
4.	"You Led Us Here"		2:59
5.	"This Is Madness!"	Hans Zimmer; Junkie XL	3:48
6.	"Earth"		6:11
7.	"Arcade"	Hans Zimmer; Junkie XL	7:25
Total length:			115:08

Music appearing in the film and not included on the soundtrack

#	Title	Performer(s)
1	"Ring of Fire"	Allison Crowe (Johnny Cash cover)
2	"Seasons"	Chris Cornell
3	"The Long Walk"	Marco Beltrami and Buck Sanders

== Personnel ==
Primary artist

- Hans Zimmer – composer, producer, arranger

Production

- Peter Asher – co-producer

Orchestrators

- Bruce Fowler
- Elizabeth Finch
- Kevin Kaska
- Rick Giovinazzo

Additional music

- Tom Holkenborg – additional music and rhythm design
- Atli Örvarsson – additional music
- Andrew Kawczynski – additional music
- Steve Mazzaro – additional music

Additional personnel and recording

- Mel Wesson – ambient music design
- Czarina Russell – score coordinator
- Steven Kofsky – music production services
- Melissa Muik – music editor
- Howard Scarr – synth programmer
- Mark Wherry – digital instrument design
- Alan Meyerson – music score mixing
- Hilda "Thórhildur" Örvarsdóttir – vocals

Percussion Session Musicians

- Matt Chamberlain
- Josh Freese
- Danny Carey
- Jason Bonham
- Pharrell Williams
- Sheila E.
- John JR Robinson
- Satnam Ramgotra
- Toss Panos
- Jim Keltner
- Vinnie Colaiuta
- Bernie Dresel
- Curt Bisquera
- Trevor Lawrence Jr.
- Ryeland Allison

Musicians

- Martin Tillman
- Ann Marie Calhoun
- Bryce Jacobs

== Charts ==
=== Weekly charts ===
Chart (2013)	Peak position
Austrian Albums (Ö3 Austria)	41
Belgian Albums (Ultratop Flanders)	62
Belgian Albums (Ultratop Wallonia)	88
French Albums (SNEP)	61
German Albums (Offizielle Top 100)	38
Spanish Albums (Promusicae)	35
Swiss Albums (Schweizer Hitparade)	47
US Billboard 200	9
US Soundtrack Albums (Billboard)	2

=== Year-end charts ===
Chart (2013)	Position
US Soundtrack Albums (Billboard)	23
