= The Dark Knight Rises (soundtrack) =

The Dark Knight Rises: Original Motion Picture Soundtrack

Soundtrack album by Hans Zimmer
- Released: July 17, 2012
- Genre: Film score
- Length: 51:20
- Labels: WaterTower; Sony Classical

Hans Zimmer chronology
Madagascar 3: Europe's Most Wanted (2012)	The Dark Knight Rises: Original Motion Picture Soundtrack (2012)	Man of Steel (2013)

The Dark Knight Rises: Original Motion Picture Soundtrack is the soundtrack to the film of the same name, which is the sequel to Christopher Nolan's 2008 film The Dark Knight. The soundtrack was released on July 17, 2012. The CD edition of the album contains an exclusive code to unlock three bonus tracks, titled "Bombers Over Ibiza (Junkie XL Remix)," "No Stone Unturned," and "Risen from Darkness". Two additional bonus tracks, "The Shadows Betray You" and "The End," are digital-download exclusive tracks. The soundtrack was officially released online for streaming purposes on July 10.

Additional cues were released through an iPhone app titled The Dark Knight Rises Z+ App Origins Pack. The app contains four original suites by Hans Zimmer ("Wayne Manor," "Selina Kyle," "Orphan," and "Bane") that were created during the early stages of development for the film. A complete soundtrack has also been posted on YouTube with 54 tracks.

The main themes were composed and arranged by Hans Zimmer and James Newton Howard, but Howard did not return to the series to score this film and was not credited as a composer. Regarding his departure from the franchise, Howard said: "I just really felt that I had made what I felt like I could contribute to that series, and I always felt that... Hans... was the mastermind of those scores. I mean, they really sounded the way they sounded because of him. His conception of the scores was really brilliant. It's not that I didn't add a lot, I did, but I don't think I added the aspects of the music that really defined the character of those movies."

Just like Batman Begins and The Dark Knight, the main motif for Batman consists of just two notes, played by horns and accompanied by strings, representing the character's pain and guilt.

In many tracks, Batman's main action theme ("Molossus") is reprised, which was also used in the first two movies of the trilogy.

The score won in the category "Best Original Score" at the Denver Film Society, while it was nominated in other events, including the Grammy Awards and the Saturn Awards. At the Brit Awards, Zimmer won as "Composer of the Year" for his work on the scores of The Dark Knight Rises and Man of Steel.

== Commercial performance ==
The album debuted at number 10 on the Canadian Albums Chart and peaked at number 25 in the Spanish Albums Chart.

== HDTracks version ==
A high-resolution digital version of the soundtrack was released by HDTracks in 24-bit/192 kHz. It contains all the bonus tracks from the standard digital edition, but spectral analysis of the audio files shows they were not true high-resolution files, with no frequencies at all above 22 kHz or so (basically equivalent to a 48 kHz sampling rate).

== Chant ==
The film features a prevalent chant of the phrase deshi basara, which, according to Hans Zimmer himself, means "rise up" in a language which he says he's happy to have kept secret (allegedly Moroccan or another Arabic dialect; the Mongolian word "deeshee bosooroi" means literally "rise up," though this is disputed).

When asked about the development of the chant, Zimmer said: "The chant became a very complicated thing because I wanted hundreds of thousands of voices, and it's not so easy to get hundreds of thousands of voices. So, we tweeted and we posted on the internet, for people who wanted to be part of it. It seemed like an interesting thing. We've created this world, over these last two movies, and somehow I think the audience and the fans have been part of this world. We do keep them in mind."

== Reception ==
Professional ratings
Review scores
Source	Rating
AllMusic	4/5 stars
Empire	4/5 stars
Filmtracks	2/5 stars
Movie Music UK	3.5/5 stars
Movie Wave	2/5 stars
Soundtrack Geek	9/10 stars

The score received mostly positive reviews. Heather Phares of Allmusic commented that "while Hans Zimmer's music for Christopher Nolan's Batman movies aren't as high-concept as some of his other scores, such as Inception or Gladiator, Zimmer ties the music for the final installment of Nolan's Batman trilogy to his previous scores, but allows these pieces to have their own flourishes as well."

Filmtracks, on the other hand, stated that "lost in all of the media hype and sensationalism surrounding this franchise's second coming is the artistic merit of Nolan's achievements, and a contributing factor to the frenzy is undoubtedly Hans Zimmer's involvement as the concept's now most frequent musical voice." Filmtracks even went to the next level by stating that "unfortunately for Zimmer, his actual speaking voice is so prevalent in interviews that the soundtracks for these films have become their own form of spectacle. Not since John Williams of the early 1980s has a film composer become such a mainstream attraction, and Zimmer indulges the attention by constantly unleashing his thought process and sense of humor in interviews that don't always make much sense when strung together."

Jonathan Broxton of Movie Music UK wrote that "in many ways, The Dark Knight Rises showcases the best and the worst of Hans Zimmer's musical personality in one all-encompassing score. On the one hand, the intellectual design and intelligent use of Bane's Chant shows Zimmer at his creative best, taking a simple idea and working it around to suggest complex concepts and subtle changes in context. On the other hand, you have the same old arguments: the Zimmer sound permeating the Hollywood mainstream to such a degree that composers as talented as Alan Silvestri and Patrick Doyle are being asked to ape the style; the fact that Zimmer himself seems to be stuck in a rut, writing what in effect are little more than variations of the same score on almost every action film he tackles; the over-reliance on electronic enhancements, ghostwriters, arrangers, and so on and so on. The bottom line is this: fans of the Zimmer style will love it, fans and of the current Batman style will love it, whereas anyone whose musical tastes tend to veer towards the predominantly orchestral will find a great deal of it boring, or unpalatable, or both."

== Tracklist ==
#	Title	Length	Key Scenes/Notes
1	"A Storm is Coming"	0:37	The music is heard during the opening logos of the film. In the film it is followed immediately by "Gotham's Reckoning." The title is referenced when Selina Kyle says, "There's a storm coming, Mr. Wayne."
2	"On Thin Ice"	2:55	The track is heard during the reception at Wayne Manor on "Dent Day," when John Blake visits Bruce at Wayne Manor, and when Miranda and Bruce are at the manor. It's the first time that the two-note motif is heard in the soundtrack, played in a soft way.
3	"Gotham's Reckoning"	4:08	Bane's principal theme, it is considered the first "official" music heard in the film, played during the scene in which Bane crashes the plane. Parts of it are also used before "The Fire Rises" and "Risen From Darkness" in the film. It is referenced when Bane kills Dagget dubbing himself as "Gotham's reckoning."
4	"Mind If I Cut In?"	3:27	Selina Kyle's theme, it is first played when she steals the deceased Mrs. Wayne's pearls. It also plays predominantly when Blake stops Selina Kyle to get information, and pieces of it often play when Selina appears onscreen. The title is taken from the scene when Bruce interrupts Selina during a dance to retrieve the pearls and says, "Mind if I cut in?"
5	"Underground Army"	3:12	Played whilst Gordon and the others plot to rescue the trapped policemen underground. The title is taken from the scene when John Blake and Bruce Wayne first encounter where John Blake says, "... he was babbling about an underground army and a masked man called Bane."
6	"Born in Darkness"	1:57	Played in the scene where an inmate tells Bruce the legend of a mercenary and the child who escaped the pit. It is referenced when Bane tells Batman that he was born in darkness during their first battle.
7	"The Fire Rises"	5:33	The first section is primarily heard when Bane and his men escape from the Stock Exchange on motorcycles. In the film, the track "Risen from Darkness" comes in shortly after this track is introduced. The rest is heard during Bane's speech in front of Blackgate Prison as well as the second fight between Batman and Bane. It is referenced when Bane says, "Yes....The fire rises!" to one of his mercenaries during the prologue.
8	"Nothing Out There"	2:51	Played when Bruce is in the Bat Cave looking up information on Selina Kyle. The title comes from Bruce telling Alfred, "There's nothing out there for me."
9	"Despair"	3:14	Played when Batman first reappears in Gotham by lighting the symbol on the bridge and then rescues John Blake from Bane's thugs. It uses the Batman Begins "Vespertilio" theme predominantly. The title comes from Bane's statement, "Home...where I learned the truth about despair."
10	"Fear Will Find You"	3:08	It is played in the scene when Batman saves Selina from Bane's men and they are flying over Gotham in the Bat. The title comes from the scene where the doctor in the pit tells Bruce to climb "without the rope. Then fear will find you again." It also contains samples of "I'm Not a Hero" from The Dark Knight composed by Zimmer and James Newton Howard.
11	"Why Do We Fall?"	2:03	Played when Bruce sees a flashback of his father asking him, "Why do we fall?" and subsequently manages to climb out of the pit.
12	"Death By Exile"	0:23	Played when Bane speaks to a wounded Bruce in the pit. Its title comes from the scene where Dr. Crane sentences Gordon and his allies to death by exile.
13	"Imagine the Fire"	7:25	This track is part of the Wayne Manor theme suite, which was composed in the film's development. The first minute or so is entirely unused in the film. The part from 1:10 to 3:41 appears—edited differently—during the end credits, while the section between 1:54 to 2:34 is used when Batman is being chased by the police after he rescues the hostage and retrieves the tablet used in the stock exchange. A shortened version of the theme from 4:00-5:16 is used when the police officer threatens to blow the bridge; the rest of the track is a variation on the music that plays during the fight between Batman and Bane outside the courthouse. The title of this track comes from Bane telling Batman, "You'll just have to imagine the fire!"
14	"Necessary Evil"	3:16	Played when Batman knocks Bane into the courthouse and Miranda Tate reveals herself as Talia al Ghul. The title is derived from Bane's declaration to Daggett that he is "necessary evil."
15	"Rise"	7:11	This music accompanies the last scene of the film, from when Batman flies the Bat out into the sea to the ending moment of Blake rising in the Bat Cave. This track is not exactly the one used in the film, however; the film version is slightly altered beginning at 5:20, while the music at the very end is lifted directly out of the previous film.

Digital Bonus Tracks

#	Title	Length	Key Scenes/Notes
16	"Bombers Over Ibiza"	5:52	Remixed by Junkie XL, unused in the film.
17	"The Shadows Betray You"	5:20	The title comes from Bane's statement to Batman: "The shadows betray you...because they belong to me!" The track is unused in the film.
18	"The End"	6:13	This track is essentially an extended version of the music at the end of the film.

Enhanced CD Bonus Tracks

#	Title	Length	Key Scenes/Notes
16	"Bombers Over Ibiza"	5:51	See table above.
17	"No Stone Unturned"	7:29	Played during the final action/chase sequence when Batman, Fox, Selina, and Gordon are trying to stop Talia and the bomb. The track is heavily edited in the film itself, including a small portion of Wayne Manor theme suite, a section which is absent from the track as it appears on the album. The very end of the track plays during Gordon's speech on Harvey Dent Day. The title of the track comes from a man's statement near the end of the film where he says, "We better leave no stone unturned". This track contains the three-note motif present when Batman defeats the main villain, in this case, Talia al-Ghul.
18	"Risen from Darkness"	4:27	Played during the chase scene when Batman first appears. This track is not the one used within the film, but is instead the initial cue before it underwent re-editing. The version used in the film itself makes heavy use of temp tracks lifted directly from the previous two films (as opposed to the new variations on those cues found in here), and the middle section is edited differently as well. Additionally, the rising note at the beginning of the track is shorter in the film.

MovieTickets.com Exclusive Track

#	Title	Length	Key Scenes/Notes
16	"All Out War"	3:17	The first half of this track plays after Batman frees the cops trapped underground, until Selina rides off on the Batpod in the next scene. The second half plays when Bruce Wayne is taken with a bag over his head to Lucius Fox.

Z+ App Origins Pack

#	Title	Length	Key Scenes/Notes
16	"Wayne Manor"	22:05	Theme suite composed in the development of the film. It contains the album tracks "On Thin Ice" and "Imagine the Fire," as well as several unreleased and unused cues. Most notably, it includes the music that plays when Selina leads Batman to Bane.
17	"Bane"	19:45	Theme suite composed in the development of the film, containing the chant. Also present are portions of "Gotham's Reckoning" and "The Fire Rises," as well as several unreleased cues.
18	"Selina Kyle"	5:41	Theme suite composed in the development of the film. Parts of it play whenever Selina appears, and parts of it are unused in the film.
19	"Orphan"	4:51	Theme suite composed in the development of the film. It is another variation on the finale music.

Complete Soundtrack

#	Title	Length	Key Scenes/Notes
1	Logo	1:22	
2	Prologue	5:21	
3	The Truth About Harvey Dent	2:53	
4	Room Service	0:18	
5	Uncrackeble Safe	2:11	
6	He Was the Batman	1:03	
7	Nothing Out There For Me	3:10	
8	Is He Coming Back? / Bar Shootout	5:38	
9	Gordon Underground	2:24	
10	Blake Visits Wayne Manor	3:08	
11	Hospital Visit / Bruce Follows Selina	2:24	
12	For Old Times' Sake / Applied Sciences	3:24	
13	Risen From Darkness	1:47	
14	Stock Exchange	5:06	
15	Batman Chased	4:31	
16	Selina Finds Daggett	2:19	
17	Rooftop Fight / Back to Batcave	4:10	
18	Handing Over the Reactor	3:38	
19	Do You Feel in Charge?	1:25	
20	Batman Could Be Anybody / Selina Apartment	1:50	
21	Miranda Visits Wayne / Take Me To Bane	4:18	
22	The Shadows Betray You	2:00	
23	Airport Detainee	1:34	
24	No True Despair Without Hope	2:40	
25	Board Members Taken Hostage	1:21	
26	A Child Born In This Hell	1:34	
27	Cops Into Sewer / Core Separated	4:37	
28	Instrument Of Your Liberation	7:10	
29	Gotham Is Yours	4:48	
30	Born In Darkness	2:10	
31	This Is Bane's Prison	1:10	
32	Many Forms Of Immortality	1:36	
33	There's A Storm Going On	1:59	
34	Not Meant To Die Here	1:41	
35	No Ordinary Child	1:00	
36	Special Forces Arrive	3:12	
37	Someone Sold Us Out	2:35	
38	Without A Rope	2:12	
39	Death Or Exile? / Gordon To Foley	3:52	
40	Get Me The Fox / Gordon Arrested	2:06	
41	Death By Exile / Bagged Bruce Wayne	2:03	
42	Remember Where You Parked It?	1:05	
43	On Thin Ice / Batman Returns	3:46	
44	Come With Me	2:04	
45	All Out War	5:16	
46	Not An Ordinary Citizen	4:49	
47	Imagine The Fire	1:47	
48	Chasing The Convoy West	3:33	
49	A Hero Can Be Anyone	2:37	
50	Sacrifice	1:33	
51	It Was The Batman	5:13	
52	No Stone Unturned	1:31	
53	Fernet-Branca	0:33	
54	End Credits	7:46	

Tracks not included within the release of the soundtrack:

#	Title	Performer(s)	Key Scenes/Notes
1	"Pavane pour une infante défunte"	Minnesota Orchestra, Stanislaw Skrowaczewski, Conductor	
2	"The Star-Spangled Banner"	C.J. Coyne	
3	"Roses From the South"	Johann Strauss II	The dance scene. Uncredited.

== Recurring motifs ==
The score of The Dark Knight Rises contains many musical references to the previous films in the trilogy. Some notable examples of this are the following:

- The two-note motif, which has served as a theme throughout the trilogy.
- The bat-flapping motif which has accompanied the opening logos for each of the three films.
- The music used at the beginning of the credits for each of the three films (which accompanies the Batman's first appearance in this film as well as in The Dark Knight).
- The music sung by the choir boy in "Rise," which also played in Batman Begins after the death of Bruce's parents.
- The music when Ra's al Ghul appears in this film, which is the same piece used in Batman Begins when he spoke to Bruce in the prison.
- The music that plays when Bruce first appears in this film, which also played when the adult Bruce was seen for the first time in Batman Begins after he awoke in the prison.
- The heroic theme which plays when Bruce escapes Bane's prison which also played when he was surrounded by bats in Batman Begins, when Batman used the BatPod for the first time and when he was escaping police at the end of The Dark Knight, and when John Blake was in the Bat Cave at the end of The Dark Knight Rises.
- The action theme which is heard when Batman is evading the police during his first appearance was also played in Batman Begins, when Batman summons bats in Arkham and escapes while running past the holding cells.
- The uplifting music used at the end of this film, which was the same piece used at the end of The Dark Knight when Batman told his plan to Gordon.
- The three note motif that plays when Batman defeats the villain, in this film right when Talia's truck goes over the edge of the overpass, in The Dark Knight when Batman throws the Joker over the edge of the building, and in Batman Begins when Batman glides out of the train before it goes over the edge of the rails.

With regard to recurring themes for the Batman character, Zimmer said: "I thought if we set up a couple of things you can recognise in a second from right at the beginning, like the ostinato, the little bubbling string figure, when he's coming, when we get to the moment in the movie when he's actually going to appear, you'd hear that stuff and really get excited. It was as simple as that. I wanted some little symbolic motifs that would signal to the audience that really, honestly, it is going to happen."

== Chart positions ==
Chart (2012)	Peak position
U.S. Billboard 200	8
Top Canadian Albums	10
Top Digital Albums	8
Top Independent Albums	1
Top Soundtracks	1
