= The Boy Band Con: The Lou Pearlman Story =

- Directed by: Aaron Kunkel
- Produced by: Lance Bass; Matthew Charles Ducey; Sam Korkis; Nicholas Caprio
- Starring: Lance Bass; AJ McLean; Ashley Parker Angel; Chris Kirkpatrick; JC Chasez; Johnny Wright; Lynn Harless; Aaron Carter; Nikki Deloach; Diane Bass
- Cinematography: Henry Darrow McComas; Aaron Kunkel
- Edited by: Aaron Kunkel; Shane Patterson
- Music by: Bleeding Fingers
- Production companies: Fox Searchlight Pictures; Pilgrim Media Group
- Distributed by: YouTube Premium; Walt Disney Studios Motion Pictures
- Release dates: March 13, 2019 (SXSW); April 3, 2019 (YouTube Premium)
- Running time: 99 minutes
- Country: United States
- Language: English

The Boy Band Con: The Lou Pearlman Story (working title The Lou Pearlman Project) is an American documentary film that premiered on March 13, 2019 at SXSW. Produced by Lance Bass, the film explores the career and legacy of record producer and convicted criminal Lou Pearlman.

== Premise ==
The Boy Band Con: The Lou Pearlman Story features "the story of Lou Pearlman, his remarkable successes and offenses, and his tragic end while serving a 25-year prison sentence for multiple felony convictions. "The Lou Pearlman Project" reveals the dark side of stardom and the music industry as members of multi-platinum-selling bands like *NSYNC, Backstreet Boys, O-Town, Innosense, Take 5 and C-Note tell all about working with Pearlman."

== Persons featured ==
The documentary includes interviews with:

- AJ McLean (Backstreet Boys)
- Ashley Parker Angel (O-Town)
- Aaron Carter
- JC Chasez (*NSYNC)
- Chris Kirkpatrick (*NSYNC)
- Lance Bass (*NSYNC)
- Nikki DeLoach (Innosense)
- David Perez (C-Note)
- Tim "TJ" Christofore (Take 5)
- Diane Bass (Mother of Lance Bass)
- Lynn Bomar Harless (Mother of Justin Timberlake (*NSYNC))

== Production ==
On April 24, 2018, it was announced that YouTube Red was in production on The Lou Pearlman Project, a documentary executive produced by Lance Bass, Craig Piligian, Nicholas Caprio, and Sam Korkis. The documentary was set to feature interviews with AJ McLean, Ashley Parker Angel, Aaron Carter, JC Chasez, Chris Kirkpatrick, Lance Bass, Diane Bass, and Lynn Bomar Harless. Production companies involved with the film were slated to consist of Pilgrim Media Group.

== Release ==
The film held its world premiere at the Paramount Theatre in Austin, Texas on March 13, 2019, during the South by Southwest film festival as part of the "24 Beats Per Second" series of screenings.
