= List of songs written by Diane Warren =

This is a list of the songs that have been written by American songwriter Diane Warren. It is split into the full list of contributions and those that have performed in the charts across various countries. Additionally, the international singles and certifications are placed by order of the song's initial release, which may coincide with an album release.

== Songs ==
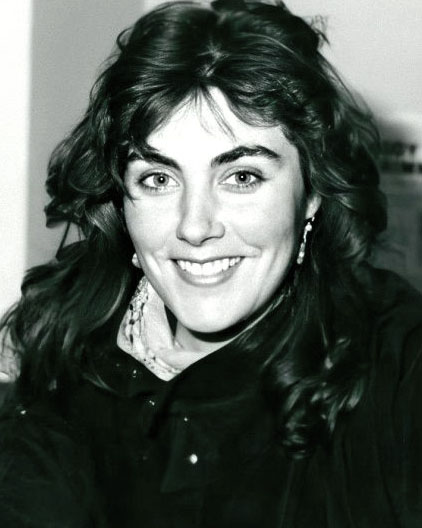
Warren's first hit was with "Solitaire", which Laura Branigan took to the Top 10 on the Billboard Hot 100 in March 1983.

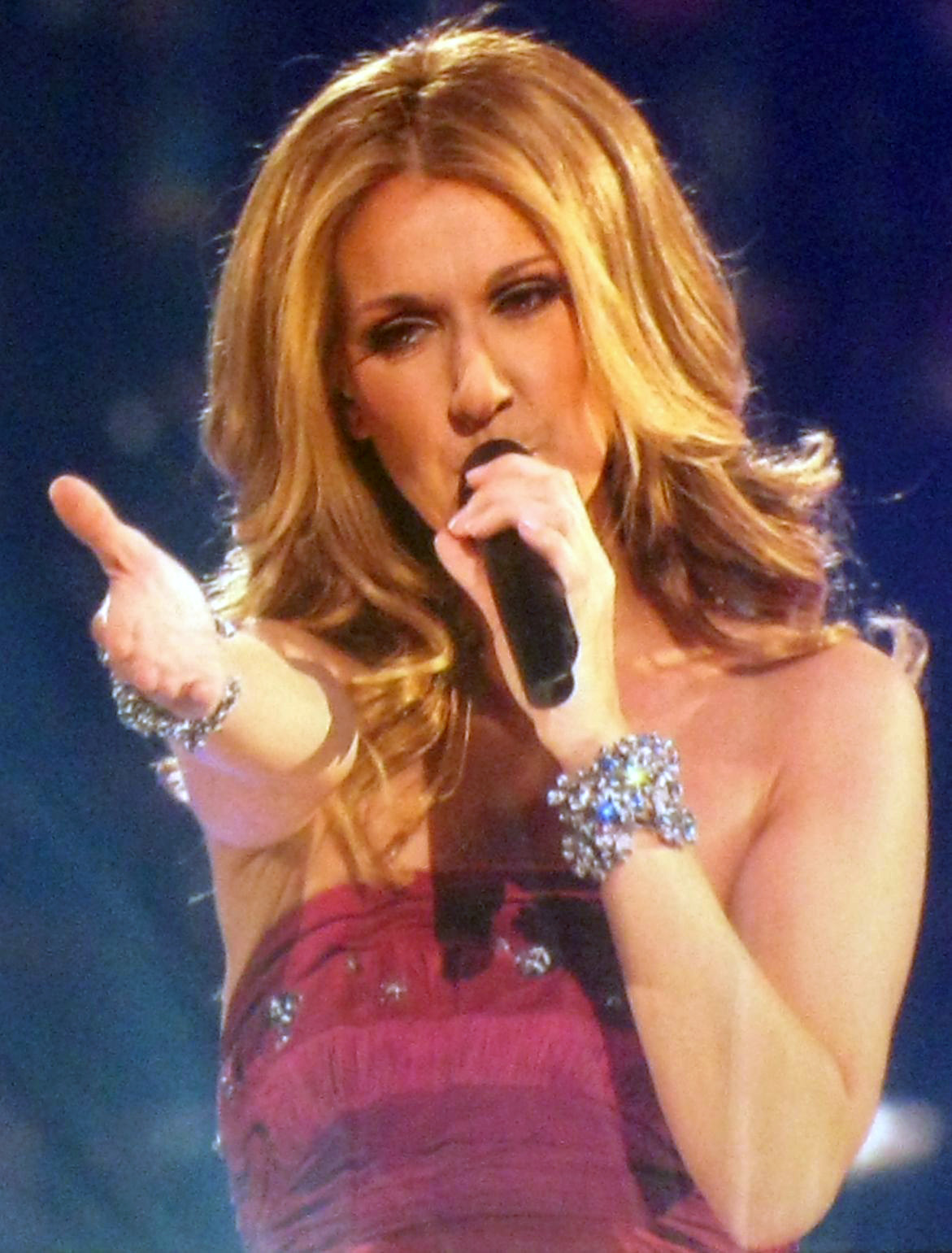
Warren has been nominated for twelve Grammy Awards, including "Because You Loved Me", performed by Celine Dion.

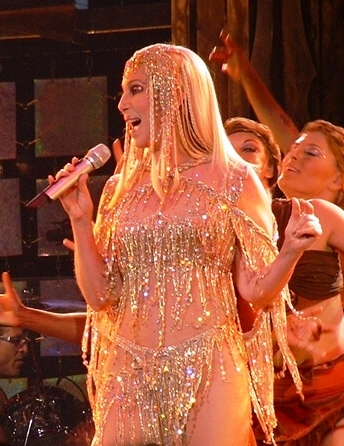
"You Haven't Seen the Last of Me", written for Cher, earned Warren her first Golden Globe Award in 2011 after four previous nominations.

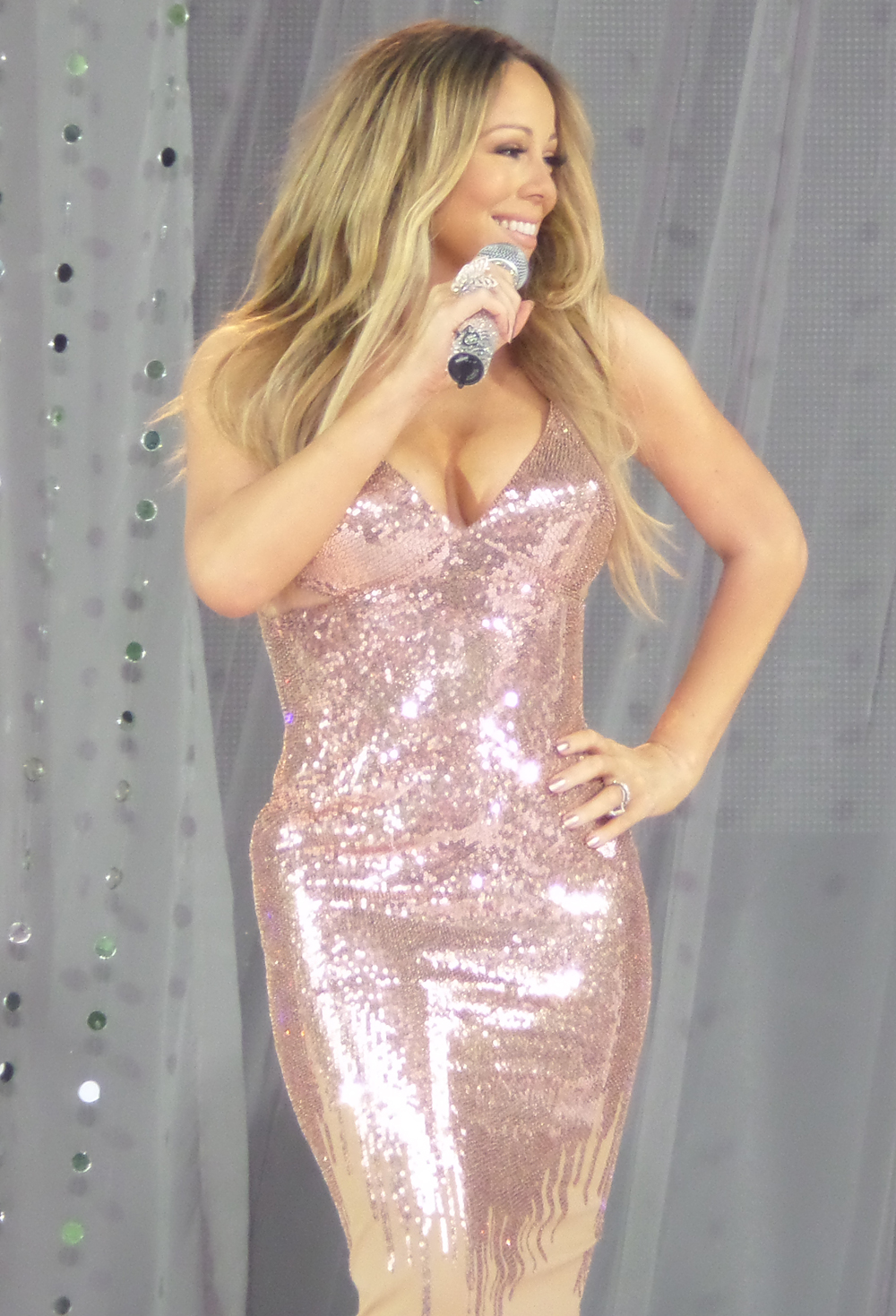
Mariah Carey co-wrote the songs that she worked with Warren on.

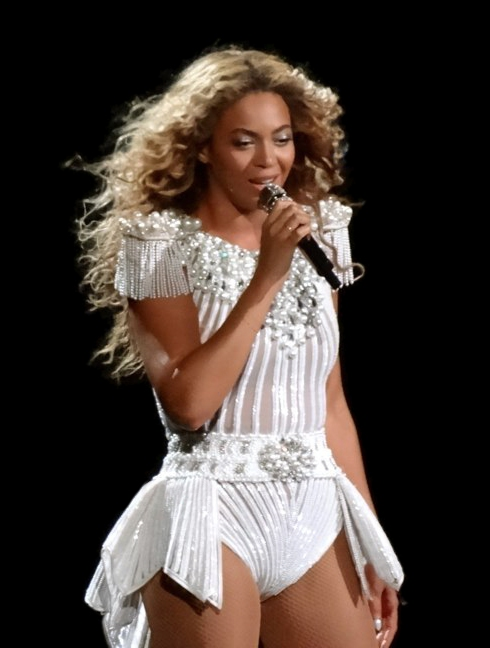
Warren wrote "I Was Here" (inspired by the September 11 attacks) for Beyoncé.

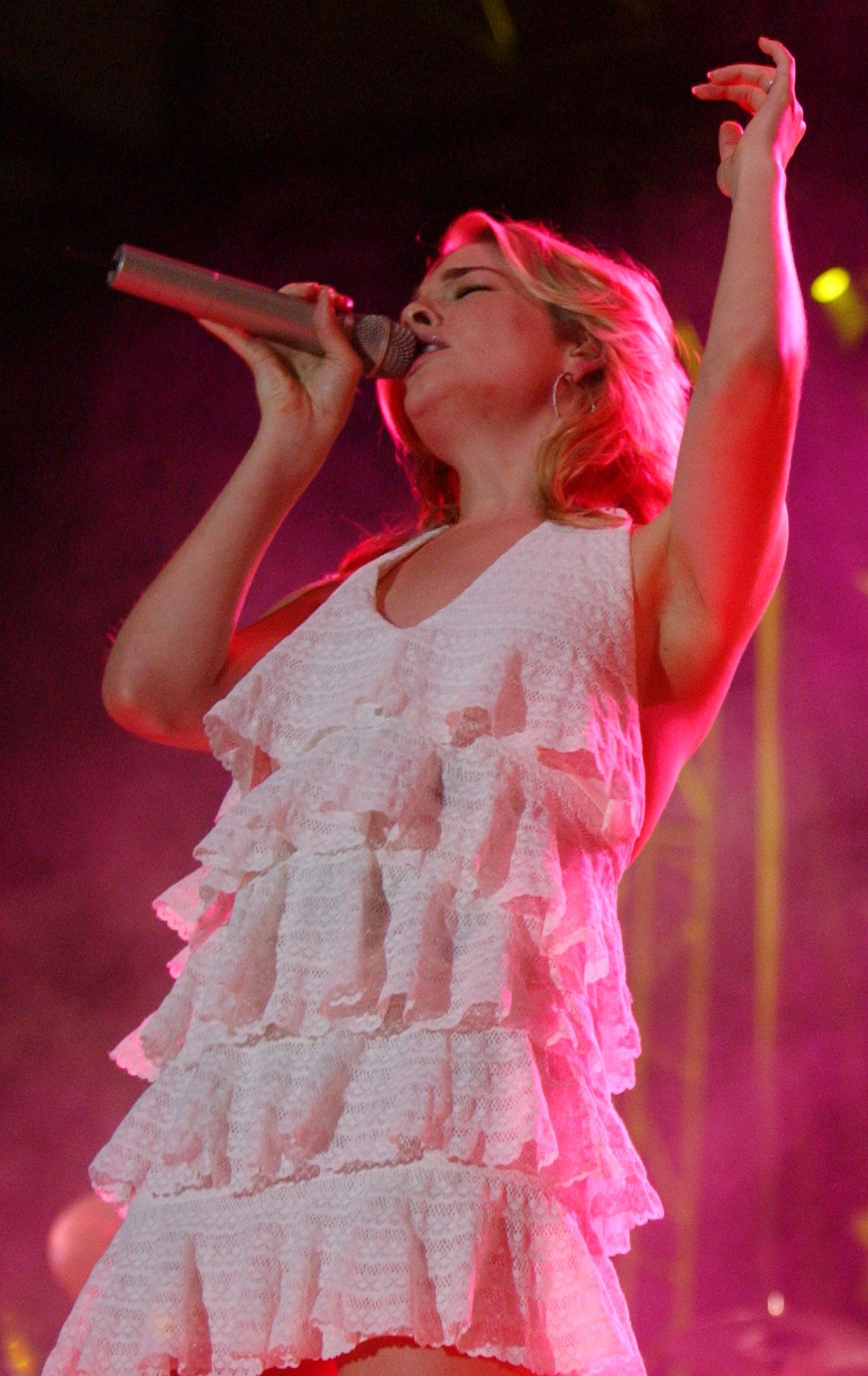
Warren has written ten songs for LeAnn Rimes, including her hits "How Do I Live" and "Can't Fight the Moonlight".

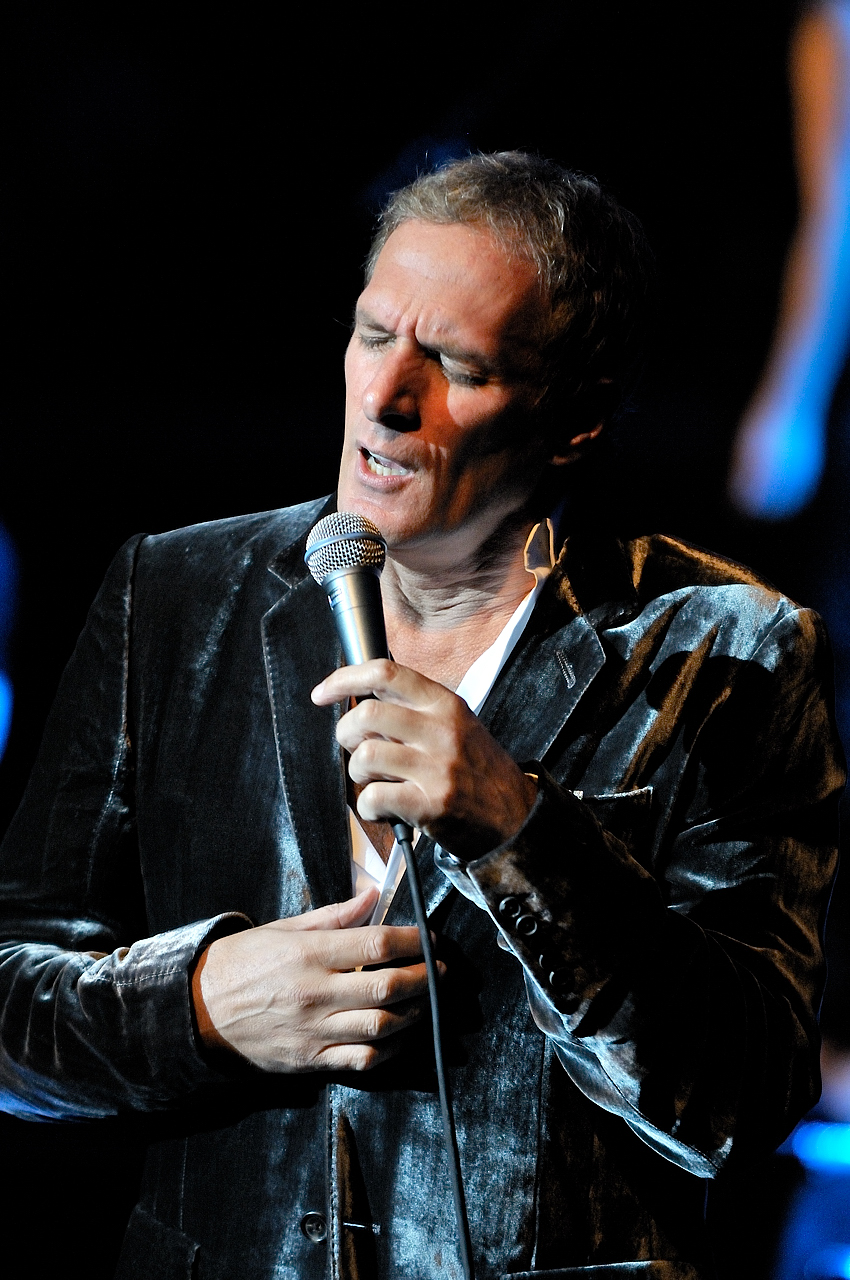
Michael Bolton has recorded twenty four songs that were written by Warren.

Key
†	Indicates single release

Songs written by Warren, with original artists, co-writers and originating album, showing year released
Title	Artist(s)	Co-writer(s)	Originating album	Year	US Hot 100	US A/C	UK Chart	Ref.
"5 Minutes with God"	Take 6	—N/a	Believe	2016				
"Act of Faith"	Pandora	—N/a	Breathe	1999				
"Activate My Love"	Joyce Kennedy	The Doctor	Wanna Play Your Game!	1985				
"Adiós Corazón"	Leslie Grace	—N/a	Leslie Grace	2013				
"After Tonight"	Mariah Carey	David Foster; Mariah Carey	Rainbow	1999				
"Aim for the Heart"	SouthGang	—N/a	Tainted Angel	1991				
"All I Want Is Forever" †	James "J.T." Taylor and Regina Belle	—N/a	Tap soundtrack	1989		34		
"All My Tomorrows"	Kenny Lattimore	—N/a	From the Soul of Man	1998				
"All the Way to Heaven"	Jody Watley	—N/a	Beverly Hills, 90210 soundtrack	1992				
"All You Mean to Me Is Everything" †	Jodie Resther	—N/a	Real	1998				
"All Your Attention"	Daniel Bedingfield	Daniel Bedingfield	Second First Impression	2004				
"Alpha Dance"	Maurice White	Robbie Buchanan; Maurice White	Maurice White	1985				
"And the Night Stood Still" †	Dion DiMucci	—N/a	Yo Frankie	1989	75	16		
"Angeles"	Daniela Pedali	H. Olivo	Amore	2005				
"Animal Crackers"	Steven Tyler	Trevor Rabin; Harry Gregson-Williams	Armageddon: The Album	1998				
"Answer Your Phone"	Leon Thomas	Thomas; Peter Lee Johnson; Freaky Rob	MUTT	2024				
"Any Other Fool" †	Sadao Watanabe (featuring Patti Austin)	Robbie Buchanan	Front Seat	1989		6		
"Are We Over"	Charice	—N/a	Charice	2010				
"Are You Gonna Be There"	NSYNC	—N/a	Your #1 Requests... and More!	2000				
"Are You Gonna Throw It All Away"	Agnetha Fältskog	Guy Roche; Albert Hammond	I Stand Alone	1987				
"The Arms of the One Who Loves You" †	Xscape	—N/a	Traces of My Lipstick	1998	7		46	
"As Long as I Can Dream" †	Exposé	Roy Orbison	Exposé	1992	56	21		
"Avant De Me Donner À Vous"	Native	—N/a	Laura Mayne-Kerbrat	2002				
"Baby Be There"	Atlantic Starr	—N/a	Time	1994				
"Baby I Would"	O-Town	—N/a	O-Town	2001				
"Bad Boys"	Barbara Mandrell	—N/a	Spun Gold	1983				
"Be a Little Easy on Me"	Charles & Eddie	—N/a	Duophonic	1992				
"Be What You Believe"	Avon Voices	—N/a	—N/a	2011				
"Beautiful Scars"	Merry Clayton	—N/a	Beautiful Scars	2021				
"Because You Loved Me" † (Note: a Spanish-language version of "Because You Loved Me" called "Porque Me Amas" was recorded by Mexican singer Diana Mor in 2007, an Italian-language version called "Se Tu Mi Ami" was recorded by Italian singer Annalisa Minetti and a Cantonese-language version called "只因找到你" was recorded by Hong Kong singer Cass Phang in 1997.)	Celine Dion	—N/a	Falling into You	1996	1	1	5	
"Bed of Nails" †	Alice Cooper	Alice Cooper; Desmond Child	Trash	1989			38	
"Believe in Magic"	Maurice White	Robbie Buchanan; Maurice White	Maurice White	1985				
"Best Thing You Ever Did"	Stefanie Heinzmann	—N/a	Masterplan	2008				
"Bet She Can't Love You (Like I Do)"	Rori	—N/a	Rori	1985				
"Better Me"	Keyshia Cole	—N/a	Calling All Hearts	2010				
"Big Big Love" †	Belinda Carlisle	—N/a	Kismet	2023				
"Bitch on Heels"	The Vivienne	—N/a	—N/a	2021				
"Blame It on the Rain" †	Milli Vanilli	—N/a	Girl You Know It's True	1989	1	27	52	
"Bleed for Love"	Jennifer Hudson	—N/a	Winnie Mandela soundtrack	2011				
"Blessings"	Diane Warren and Paloma Faith	—N/a	Diane Warren: The Cave Sessions, Vol. 1	2021				
"Blue Eyes Blue" †	Eric Clapton	—N/a	Runaway Bride soundtrack	1999		4	94	
"Boardwalk Baby"	Eddie Money	—N/a	Nothing to Lose	1988				
"Body to Body, Heart to Heart"	Cher	—N/a	Living Proof	2001				
"Born to Be Somebody"	Justin Bieber	—N/a	Never Say Never: The Remixes	2011	74			
"Borrowed Angels"	Kristin Chenoweth	—N/a	As I Am	2005				
"Break"	Frankie J	—N/a	Priceless	2006				
"Break"	Santana featuring Ally Brooke	—N/a	Blessings and Miracles	2021				
"Breaking Apart"	Chris Isaak	Chris Isaak	Speak of the Devil	1998				
"Breaking Out"	Laura Branigan	The Doctor	Self Control	1984				
"Breathless"	Ceremony	—N/a	Hang Out Your Poetry	1993				
"Bruised But Not Broken"	Joss Stone	—N/a	Introducing Joss Stone	2007				
"But I Do Love You" †	LeAnn Rimes	—N/a	Coyote Ugly soundtrack	2000			20	
"By the Time This Night Is Over" †	Kenny G and Peabo Bryson	Michael Bolton; Andy Goldmark	Breathless	1992	25	1	56	
"Call Me Gone" †	Patti LaBelle	—N/a	When a Woman Loves	2000				
"Call Out to Me"	Kathy Troccoli	—N/a	Love and Mercy	1997				
"Call the Shots"	Leslie Grace	—N/a	Miss Bala soundtrack	2019				
"Can I Come Over"	7 Mile	—N/a	7 Mile	1998				
"Can't Fight the Moonlight" † (Note: a German-language version of "Can't Fight the Moonlight", called "Wenn du Den Mond Siehst", was recorded by German-British singer Ireen Sheer in 2001.)	LeAnn Rimes	—N/a	Coyote Ugly soundtrack	2000	11	5	1	
"Can't Get You Out of My Heart"	Kathy Troccoli	—N/a	Pure Attraction	1991				
"Can't Lie to My Heart"	REO Speedwagon	Kevin Cronin	The Earth, a Small Man, His Dog and a Chicken	1990				
"Can't Remember a Time"	Krisdayanti	—N/a	Diane Warren Presents Love Songs	2004				
"Can't Stop My Heart from Loving You (The Rain Song)" †	Aaron Neville	—N/a	The Tattooed Heart	1995	99	23		
"Can't Take That Away (Mariah's Theme)" †	Mariah Carey	Mariah Carey	Rainbow	1999				
"Care Too Much"	Jamali	—N/a	3rd Base	2007				
"Careless Heart"	Roy Orbison	Roy Orbison; Albert Hammond	Mystery Girl	1989				
"Catch My Breath"	Due Voci	—N/a	Due Voci	2010				
"Catch the Tears"	Russell Watson	—N/a	Encore	2002				
"Caught in Your Web (Swear to Your Heart)" †	Russell Hitchcock	—N/a	Arachnophobia soundtrack	1990		9		
"Central Park Serenade"	Renée Fleming and Gregory Porter	—N/a	Christmas in New York	2014				
"The Change" †	JoJo	—N/a	non-album single	2020				
"Chasin' the Wind" †	Chicago	—N/a	Twenty 1	1991	39	13		
"Christmas Through Your Eyes" †	Gloria Estefan	Gloria Estefan	Greatest Hits	1992				
"Closest Thing to Heaven" †	Lionel Richie	—N/a	Time	1998			26	
"Come on Down"	TLC	—N/a	FanMail	1999				
"Come to Me"	David Soul	Albert Hammond	Leave a Light On	1997				
"Commitment of the Heart" †	Clive Griffin	—N/a	Clive Griffin	1993	96	38		
"Compass"	Mark Vincent	—N/a	Compass	2010				
"Completely" †	Michael Bolton	—N/a	The One Thing	1993	32	9		
"Cost of Love"	Cosima De Vito	—N/a	Cosima	2004				
"Could I Have This Kiss Forever" †	Whitney Houston and Enrique Iglesias	—N/a	Enrique	1999	52	10	7	
"Couldn't Say Goodbye" †	Tom Jones	Albert Hammond	Carrying a Torch	1991			51	
"Couldn't We"	Deborah Cox	—N/a	One Wish	1998				
"Counterfeit" (Note: according to the liner notes of The Female Boss, Warren was also credited as the sole producer of "Counterfeit".)	Tulisa	—N/a	The Female Boss	2012				
"Cover Up"	La'Porsha Renae	—N/a	Already All Ready	2017				
"The Crazy Ones"	Paloma Faith	—N/a	Miss You Already soundtrack	2015				
"Cruel Nights"	Heart	—N/a	Brigade	1990				
"Cry Over Me" †	Meat Loaf	—N/a	Bat Out of Hell III: The Monster Is Loose	2006			47	
"The Day I Stop Loving You" †	Oleta Adams	—N/a	Evolution	1993				
"Daylight"	Sérgio Mendes	Peter Wolf; Sérgio Mendes	Brasil '86	1986				
"Deeper Into You"	Belinda Carlisle	—N/a	Kismet	2023				
"Deeper Love" †	Meli'sa Morgan	—N/a	The Golden Child soundtrack	1986				
"Deeper Than a River" †	Olivia Newton-John	—N/a	Back to Basics: The Essential Collection 1971–1992	1992		20		
"Delete You"	Ashley Tisdale	—N/a	Guilty Pleasure	2009				
"Desire"	Joan Jett and the Blackhearts	Joan Jett; Kenny Laguna	Up Your Alley	1988				
"Destination Love"	Linda Lewis	—N/a	A Tear and a Smile	1983				
"Destiny"	Gloria Estefan	Gloria Estefan; Emilio Estefan; Lawrence Dermer	Destiny	1996				
"Devil's Got a New Disguise" †	Aerosmith	Steven Tyler; Joe Perry	Devil's Got a New Disguise: The Very Best of Aerosmith	2006				
"Didya Think"	Eastlife	—N/a	Some Hearts	2004				
"Divine Intervention"	Liberty X	—N/a	X	2005				
"Do You Dream About Me"	Alisha	—N/a	Mannequin soundtrack	1987				
"Do You Feel Me" †	Anthony Hamilton	—N/a	American Gangster soundtrack	2007				
"Do You Know the Way It Feels"	Alesha Dixon	—N/a	The Alesha Show	2008				
"Does Anybody Really Fall in Love Anymore?"	Cher	Jon Bon Jovi; Richie Sambora; Desmond Child	Heart of Stone	1989				
"Domino"	Diane Warren and LP	—N/a	Diane Warren: The Cave Sessions, Vol. 1	2021				
"Don't Be Afraid"	Francisca	—N/a	In My Own Way	2004				
"Don't Come Cryin'" †	Fiona	—N/a	Squeeze	1992				
"Don't Leave Me In This Love Alone"	Claire Richards	—N/a	My Wildest Dreams	2019				
"Don't Let My Heart Know"	Francisca	—N/a	In My Own Way	2004				
"Don't Let the Kiss" †	Nádine	—N/a	As Jy Wonder	2007				
"Don't Look at Me That Way" †	Chaka Khan	—N/a	The Woman I Am	1992			73	
"Don't Lose Any Sleep" †	John Waite	—N/a	Rover's Return	1987	81			
"Don't Make Me Live Without You"	No Mercy	—N/a	My Promise	1996				
"Don't Need You To (Tell Me I'm Pretty)" †	Samantha Mumba	—N/a	Legally Blonde soundtrack	2001				
"Don't Say It's Over"	El DeBarge	—N/a	El DeBarge	1986				
"Don't Take Away My Heaven" †	Aaron Neville	—N/a	The Grand Tour	1993	56	4		
"Don't Turn Around"	Aswad	Albert Hammond	Distant Thunder	1988			1	
"Don't Turn Around"	Ace of Base	Albert Hammond	The Sign	1993	4	7	5	
"Don't You Love Me Anymore" †	Joe Cocker	Albert Hammond	Cocker	1986			99	
"The Door to Your Heart"	Taylor Dayne and Keith Washington	—N/a	Soul Dancing	1993				
"Drama"	G-Dragon	G-Dragon, Choice37	Übermensch	2025				
"Dream Away" †	Babyface and Lisa Stansfield	—N/a	The Pagemaster soundtrack	1994				
"Drink You Away"	Diane Warren and Ty Dolla $ign	—N/a	Diane Warren: The Cave Sessions, Vol. 1	2021				
"Earthbound" †	Moya	—N/a	—N/a	2014				
"Emergency"	Florent Pagny	Robbie Nevil; Florent Pagny; Brock Walsh	Merci	1990				
"Emotional"	Jeffrey Osborne	David Paul Bryant	Emotional	1986				
"Emotional Fire"	Cher	Desmond Child; Michael Bolton	Heart of Stone	1989				
"Every Road Leads Back to You" †	Bette Midler	—N/a	For the Boys soundtrack	1991	78	15		
"Every Time You Walk Away"	D.A. Wallach	—N/a	Time Machine	2015				
"Every Woman Needs It" †	Jeff Lorber	Dana Fatigante	Step by Step	1985				
"Everything Changes" †	Kathy Troccoli	—N/a	Pure Attraction	1991	14	6		
"Exceptional"	JoJo	—N/a	The High Road	2006				
"Explain It to My Heart" †	Chicago	—N/a	Twenty 1	1991				
"Eyes of a Fool"	Jon Secada	Jon Secada; Miguel A. Morejon	Heart, Soul & a Voice	1994				
"Faith of the Heart" †	Rod Stewart	—N/a	Patch Adams soundtrack	1998		3	60	
"Feels Like Forever" †	Joe Cocker	Bryan Adams	Night Calls	1992			25	
"Feels Like Home"	Joan Ryan	—N/a	Joan Ryan	1997				
"Feels Like Home" †	LeAnn Rimes	—N/a	Sittin' On Top of the World	1998		17		
"Fine Line"	Bunny DeBarge	Guy Roche	In Love	1987				
"Fistibal-Festival"	Wyclef Jean (featuring Passi)	Jerry "Wonda" Duplessis; Wyclef Jean	Welcome to Haiti: Creole 101	2004				
"Flaws" †	Kierra Sheard	—N/a	Graceland	2014				
"Fooled by the Moon"	Brandy	—N/a	unreleased song	1996				
"For You I Will" †	Monica	—N/a	Space Jam soundtrack	1996	4	3	27	
"Forever Isn't Long Enough"	Michael Bolton	Desmond Child; Michael Bolton	Time, Love & Tenderness	1991				
"Forward Motion" †	Daya	—N/a	Late Night soundtrack	2019				
"Free" †	Charlie Puth	—N/a	The One and Only Ivan soundtrack	2020				
"From Loving You"	Mandy Moore	—N/a	Mandy Moore	2001				
"From the Heart" †	Another Level	—N/a	Notting Hill soundtrack	1999			6	
"Gently"	Toshi Kubota	—N/a	Nothing But Your Love	2000				
"Get a Hold of My Heart"	The Smithereens	Pat DiNizio	Blow Up	1991				
"Get Me Over You"	Jon Secada	Jon Secada; Miguel A. Morejon	Secada	1997				
"Get Used to Me"	Jessica Mauboy	—N/a	The Sapphires: Original Motion Picture Soundtrack	2012				
"Ghost Town" †	Cheap Trick	Rick Nielsen	Lap of Luxury	1988	33			
"Give a Little Love" †	Albert Hammond and Albert West	Albert Hammond	Hammond and West	1986				
"Give Me You" †	Mary J. Blige	—N/a	Mary	1999	68		19	
"Give Our Love a Fightin' Chance"	Cher	Desmond Child	Cher	1987				
"Givin' Yourself Away" †	Ratt	Stephen Pearcy; Desmond Child	Detonator	1990				
"Good Girl's Gone Bad"	Booty Luv	—N/a	Boogie 2nite	2007				
"The Good Good"	Snoop Lion (featuring Iza)	—N/a	Reincarnated	2013				
"Good Things Take Time"	Tyler Collins	—N/a	Tyler	1992				
"Grateful"	Rita Ora	—N/a	Beyond the Lights soundtrack	2014				
"Grow Old With Me"	Diane Warren, Leona Lewis and James Morrison	—N/a	Diane Warren: The Cave Sessions, Vol. 1	2021				
"Hard as Hell"	The Real Milli Vanilli	Frank Farian; Kerim Saka; Leo Slater	The Moment of Truth	1991				
"Have You Ever?" †	Brandy	—N/a	Never Say Never	1998	1	25	13	
"Healing Hands"	Jennifer Holliday	—N/a	On & On...	1994				
"Heart Be Strong"	René Froger	—N/a	Illegal Romeo Part 1	1996				
"Heart by Heart"	Demi Lovato	—N/a	The Mortal Instruments: City of Bones soundtrack	2013				
"A Heart Can Only Be So Strong"	Michael Bolton	—N/a	All That Matters	1997				
"Heart Don't Change My Mind"	Barbra Streisand	Robbie Buchanan	Emotion	1984				
"The Heart Is Not So Smart" †	DeBarge	—N/a	Rhythm of the Night	1985	75	17		
"Heart Is Weak"	Michael Johns	—N/a	Hold Back My Heart	2009				
"Heart With Your Name On It"	Gloria Estefan	—N/a	Into the Light	1991				
"Heartbreak of Love"	Dionne Warwick and June Pointer	Burt Bacharach; Carole Bayer Sager	Reservations for Two	1987				
"Heartbreak Survivor"	Midnight Sam	—N/a	Midnight Sam (EP)	1980				
"Here in My Heart" † (Note: a Spanish-language version of "Here in My Heart", called "Luna del Mar", was recorded by Spanish singer Paloma San Basilio in 1994.)	Tiffany	—N/a	New Inside	1990				
"Hide the Hurt" †	Macy Gray	—N/a	Cracked Up soundtrack	2019				
"Hot Night"	Laura Branigan	—N/a	Ghostbusters soundtrack	1984				
"Hour of Love"	Taylor Dayne	—N/a	Performance	2003				
"How Can We Be Lovers?" †	Michael Bolton	Desmond Child; Michael Bolton	Soul Provider	1989	3	3	10	
"How Do I Live" †	Trisha Yearwood	—N/a	—N/a	1997	2	1	7	
"How Does Your Heart Forget"	Ginuwine	—N/a	Elgin	2011				
"How Many Times, How Many Lies"	Pussycat Dolls	—N/a	PCD	2005				
"A Hundred Oceans"	Innosense	—N/a	So Together	2000				
"Hurt"	Jeanette Biedermann	—N/a	Naked Truth	2006				
"I Am"	Hilary Duff	—N/a	Hilary Duff	2004				
"I Belong to Me" †	Jessica Simpson	—N/a	A Public Affair	2006				
"I Bow Out"	Whitney Houston	—N/a	My Love Is Your Love	1998				
"I Bring You to My Senses"	Il Volo	—N/a	We Are Love	2012				
"I Can't Change the Way You Don't Feel"	Tommy Page	—N/a	Loving You	1996				
"I Confess" †	Deniece Williams	—N/a	Water Under the Bridge	1987				
"I Could Be Good for You"	Taylor Dayne	—N/a	Soul Dancing	1993				
"I Could Not Ask for More" † (Note: a Cantonese-language version called “不可多得” was recorded by Hong Kong singer Sammi Cheng in 1999.)	Edwin McCain	—N/a	Message in a Bottle soundtrack	1999	37	3		
"I Couldn't Do That to Me"	LeAnn Rimes	—N/a	Remnants	2016				
"I Count the Minutes"	Clive Griffin	—N/a	Clive Griffin	1993				
"I Cried My Last Tear Last Night"	Lisa Stansfield	—N/a	Lisa Stansfield	1997				
"I Decide" †	Lindsay Lohan	—N/a	The Princess Diaries 2: Royal Engagement soundtrack	2004				
"I Did It for You"	Westlife	—N/a	Turnaround	2003				
"I Didn't Know My Own Strength" †	Whitney Houston	—N/a	I Look to You	2009			44	
"I Didn't Want to Need You" †	Heart	—N/a	Brigade	1990	23		47	
"I Don't Know How I Got By"	Edwin McCain	—N/a	The Family Man soundtrack	2000				
"I Don't Wanna Dance Alone"	Royalty	—N/a	Rich and Famous	1987				
"I Don't Wanna Live Without Your Love" †	Chicago	Albert Hammond	Chicago 19	1988	3	5		
"I Don't Wanna Smile" †	Total	Khris Kellow	Kima, Keisha, and Pam	1998				
"I Don't Want To Be Alone For Christmas (Unless I'm Alone With You)"	James Ingram	—N/a	A Very Merry Chipmunk	1994				
"I Don't Want to Be Your Friend"	Cyndi Lauper	—N/a	A Night to Remember	1989				
"I Don't Want to Miss a Thing" † (Note: a Spanish-language version of "I Don't Want to Miss a Thing", called "Ni un Segundo Quiero Perder", was recorded by Argentine singer Adrián Barilari in 2007.)	Aerosmith	—N/a	Armageddon: The Album	1998	1	13	4	
"I Fall Apart"	Jennifer Holliday	—N/a	I'm on Your Side	1991				
"I Feel Beautiful"	Fantasia	—N/a	Fantasia	2006				
"I Get Weak" †	Belinda Carlisle	—N/a	Heaven on Earth	1987	2	9	10	
"I Got You"	Ciara	—N/a	Jackie	2015				
"I Hear Your Voice" †	Lionel Richie	Lionel Richie; David Foster	Time	1998		15		
"I Heart U"	Tessanne Chin	—N/a	Count on My Love	2014				
"I Just Don't Know How I Got By"	Russell Watson	—N/a	Encore	2002				
"I Just Wanna Cry"	Cosima De Vito	—N/a	Cosima	2004				
"I Keep Hoping"	Tommy Page	—N/a	Loving You	1996				
"I Know What's Good For You" †	Amy Keys	—N/a	Lover's Intuition	1989				
"I Know You Too Well"	Gloria Estefan	Gloria Estefan	Destiny	1996				
"I'll Get There (The Other Side)" †	Emeli Sandé	—N/a	Emperor soundtrack	2020				
"I'll Get Through It" †	Apocalyptica and Franky Perez featuring Geezer Butler	—N/a	—N/a	2022				
"I Learned from the Best" †	Whitney Houston	—N/a	My Love Is Your Love	1998	27	20	19	
"I Love To Watch You Sleep"	Union J	—N/a	You Got It All - The Album	2014				
"I Love You, Goodbye"	Celine Dion	—N/a	Celine Dion	1992				
"I Might" †	Tom Grennan	—N/a	Lighting Matches	2017				
"I Miss U Missing Me"	Bibi Zhou	—N/a	i, fish, light, mirror	2010				
"I Miss You Like Mad"	Tyrese	—N/a	unreleased song	2001				
"I Promise" †	Stacie Orrico	—N/a	Stacie Orrico	2003			22	
"I Run Right Back"	Patty Smyth	—N/a	Caddyshack II soundtrack	1988				
"I Save Me"	Diane Warren and Maren Morris	—N/a	Diane Warren: The Cave Sessions, Vol. 1	2021				
"I See You in a Different Light" †	Chanté Moore and JoJo Hailey	—N/a	This Moment Is Mine	1999				
"I Tried" † (Note: a French-language version of "I Tried", called "Sans Toi", was recorded by French singer Patricia Kaas in 1997.)	The Jeff Healey Band	—N/a	Get Me Some	2000				
"I Turn to You" †	All-4-One	—N/a	Space Jam soundtrack	1996				
"I Turn to You" (Note: a Spanish-language version of "I Turn to You", called "Por Siempre Tu", was included on Christina Aguilera’s 2000 album Mi Reflejo.) †	Christina Aguilera	—N/a	Christina Aguilera	1999	3	5	19	
"I Wanna Be the Rain" (Note: a Spanish version of "I Wanna Be the Rain", called "Quisiera Ser", was recorded by Mexican pop group RBD in 2006 for their album Celestial.)	RBD	—N/a	Rebels	2006				
"(I Wanna) Feel Too Much"	Travis Tritt	—N/a	The Storm	2007				
"I Wanna Get Back with You" †	Tom Jones and Tori Amos	—N/a	The Lead and How to Swing It	1994			94	
"I Wanna Hear It from My Heart"	El DeBarge	—N/a	El DeBarge	1986				
"I Wanna Move to the Beat of Your Heart"	Jerry Rix	—N/a	Jerry Rix Sings Diane Warren - Nothing's Gonna Stop Us Now	1989				
"I Wanna Take All Night"	Blake	—N/a	Start Over	2012				
"I Wanna Touch U There" (Note: a Spanish-language version of "I Wanna Touch U There", called "Quiero Encender Tu Piel", was also recorded by Sarah Connor.)	Sarah Connor	—N/a	Unbelievable	2002				
"I Want It to Be Me" (Note: an Italian-language version of "I Want It to Be Me", called "Se Te Ne Vai Cosi", was recorded by Italian singer Alexia in 2004.)	Kyle Grant	—N/a	When Dreams Go Out to Play	2003				
"I Want Some of That"	Sarah Connor	—N/a	Key to My Soul	2003				
"I Want Somebody (Bitch About)" †	Kristin Chenoweth	—N/a	Some Lessons Learned	2011				
"I Want You to Need Me" †	Celine Dion	—N/a	All the Way... A Decade of Song	1999		12		
"I Was Here" †	Beyoncé	—N/a	4	2011				
"I Will Be Here for You" † (Note: a Cantonese-language version with the same title was recorded by Hong Kong singer Eric Suen in 1994.)	Michael W. Smith	Michael W. Smith	Change Your World	1992	27	1		
"I Will Be Right Here" †	All-4-One	—N/a	On and On	1999				
"I Will Get There" †	Boyz II Men	—N/a	The Prince of Egypt soundtrack	1998	32			
"I Will Learn to Love Again" †	Kaci Battaglia	—N/a	The Perfect Man soundtrack	2005				
"I Will Remember Your Smile"	Jené	—N/a	Empire soundtrack	2002				
"I Wish That"	Bianca Ryan	—N/a	Bianca Ryan	2006				
"I Would Find a Way" †	Big Mountain	—N/a	Unity	1994				
"I'd Lie for You (And That's the Truth)" †	Meat Loaf and Patti Russo	—N/a	Welcome to the Neighbourhood	1995	13	21	2	
"I'll Be" †	Reba McEntire	—N/a	So Good Together	1999	51			
"I'll Be Your Shelter" †	Taylor Dayne	—N/a	Can't Fight Fate	1989	4	15	43	
"I'll Come Runnin'" †	Juice	—N/a	Something to Feel	1997			48	
"I'll Fight" †	Jennifer Hudson	—N/a	RBG soundtrack	2018				
"I'll Never Get Over You Getting Over Me" † (Note: a Cantonese-language version called “放不開你放下我” was recorded by Hong Kong singer Priscilla Chan in 1995.)	Exposé	—N/a	Exposé	1992	8	1	75	
"I'll Never Not Need You"	Boyzone	—N/a	Where We Belong (US Version)	1998				
"I'll Say Goodbye for the Two of Us" †	Exposé	—N/a	Free Willy 2: The Adventure Home soundtrack	1995				
"I'll Still Believe in Love"	Vince Hill	—N/a	Real Songs (Vince Hill Sings Diane Warren)	2003				
"I'll Still Love You More" †	Trisha Yearwood	—N/a	Where Your Road Leads	1998	65			
"I'm By Your Side"	Samantha Cole	—N/a	Samantha Cole	1997				
"I'm Getting Used to You" †	Selena	—N/a	Dreaming of You	1995		23		
"I'm Not Made of Steel"	Michael Bolton	Robert John "Mutt" Lange; Michael Bolton	The One Thing	1993				
"I'm Not the Only One"	Laura Branigan	The Doctor	Branigan 2	1983				
"I'm Only Wounded" †	I've Got the Bullets	Albert Hammond	Wounded	1988				
"I'm Standing with You" † (Note: 170 musical artists from around the world, including Chris Mann, Arash Avin, Mario Frangoulis, Russell Watson and many others, have joined together to create a music video of "I'm Standing With You".)	Chrissy Metz	—N/a	Breakthrough soundtrack	2019				
"I'm Still Breathing"	Toni Braxton	—N/a	The Heat	2000				
"I've Got My Heart Set on You"	Patti Austin	David Paul Bryant	Patti Austin	1984				
"If I Can't Have Your Love"	Richie Sambora	Richie Sambora; Desmond Child	100,000,000 Bon Jovi Fans Can't Be Wrong	2004				
"If I Could Turn Back Time" †	Cher	—N/a	Heart of Stone	1989	3	1	6	
"If I Don't Tell You Now"	Ronan Keating	—N/a	Boys and Girls original soundtrack / Ronan	2000				
"If I Ever See Heaven Again"	Jessica Folcker	—N/a	Jessica	1998				
"If I Was a River" †	Tina Arena	—N/a	In Deep	1998			43	
"If I Was the One" †	Ricky Jones	—N/a	Ricky Jones	1998				
"If This Is the Last Kiss (Let's Make It Last All Night)"	Meat Loaf	—N/a	Welcome to the Neighbourhood	1995				
"If This Time Is the Last Time"	Sandra Pires	—N/a	Sandra Pires	1998				
"If U Go" †	Belinda Carlisle	—N/a	Kismet	2023				
"If You Asked Me To" †	Patti LaBelle	—N/a	Be Yourself	1989	79	11		
"If You Asked Me To" †	Celine Dion	—N/a	Celine Dion	1992	4	1	57	
"If You Could See You (Through My Eyes)"	Kenny Lattimore	—N/a	From the Soul of Man	1998				
"If You Keep Loving Me"	Jerry Rix	—N/a	Jerry Rix Sings Diane Warren - Nothing's Gonna Stop Us Now	1989				
"If You Loved Me" (Note: a German-language version of "If You Loved Me", called "Wenn ich Bleibe", was recorded by German singer Andrea Jürgens in 1984.)	Laura Branigan	The Doctor	Branigan	1982				
"If You Need Somebody Tonight"	Agnetha Fältskog	Albert Hammond	I Stand Alone	1987				
"In a Heartbeat"	Ringo Starr	—N/a	Time Takes Time	1992				
"In the Arms of Love"	Michael Bolton	Desmond Child; Michael Bolton	The One Thing	1993				
"In Walked Love" †	Exposé	—N/a	Exposé	1992	84	17		
"In Walked Love" †	Louise Redknapp	—N/a	Naked (Louise album)	1996			17	
"Inch By Inch" †	Patti Day	—N/a	Love Crazy	1988				
"Inescapable" †	Jessica Mauboy	—N/a	Get 'Em Girls	2011				
"Insecurious"	Cyndi Lauper	Cyndi Lauper; Desmond Child	A Night to Remember	1989				
"Inside" †	Monica	—N/a	The Boy Is Mine	1998				
"Is It Over Yet"	Wynonna Judd	—N/a	Wynonna judd	1993				
"Into the Night of Blue"	Ace of Base	Jonas Berggren; Douglas Carr	Cruel Summer	1998				
"Invincible"	Michelle	—N/a	The Meaning of Love	2004				
"Is It Wrong, Is It Right"	Renée Diggs	Derek Bramble	Oasis	1993				
"It All Comes Down to You" †	Billie Myers	—N/a	Down to You soundtrack	2000				
"It Isn't, It Wasn't, It Ain't Never Gonna Be" †	Aretha Franklin and Whitney Houston	Albert Hammond	Through the Storm	1989	41		29	
"It Wouldn't Be Love"	Vixen	—N/a	Rev It Up	1990				
"It's My Time" †	Jade Ewen	Andrew Lloyd Webber	Eurovision Song Contest: Moscow 2009	2009			27	
"It's Only My Heart"	Michael Bolton	Michael Bolton	Soul Provider	1989				
"Je Vous dis Merci"	Miss Dominique	—N/a	Si Je N'Etais Pas Moi	2009				
"Just Another Night"	Ann Lewis	—N/a	Pink Pussycat	1979				
"Just Like Jesse James" †	Cher	Desmond Child	Heart of Stone	1989	8	9	11	
"Just One Touch"	Johnny Mathis	Robbie Buchanan	Right from the Heart	1985				
"Just the Thought of You"	Tony Hadley	—N/a	The State of Play	1992				
"Just to Hear You Say That You Love Me" †	Chynna Phillips	—N/a	Naked and Sacred	1995				
"Just You"	Stephanie Mills	Robbie Buchanan	Stephanie Mills	1985				
"Kiss My Kisses Goodbye"	Glennis Grace	—N/a	Secrets of My Soul	2003				
"Kiss the Tears Away"	Stevie B	—N/a	Healing	1992				
"La Luna Hizo Esto"	Il Volo	Mark Portmann; Edgar Cortázar	Il Volo	2010				
"Language Of Love"	Gloria Estefan	—N/a	Into the Light	1991				
"Last Kiss"	Anita Cochran	—N/a	Anita	2000				
"Late Last Night"	Anastacia	—N/a	Not That Kind (US Version)	2001				
"Lately I" †	Faith Evans	Stevie J	Keep the Faith	1998				
"Leave While I'm Not Looking" †	Paloma Faith	—N/a	A Perfect Contradiction	2014				
"Leaving's Not Leaving" †	LeAnn Rimes	—N/a	Anywhere but Here soundtrack	1999				
"Lessons Learned"	Carrie Underwood	—N/a	Some Hearts	2005				
"Let Me Make It Up to You Tonight"	Jody Watley	—N/a	White Men Can't Jump soundtrack	1992				
"Let's Make It Last All Night" †	Jimmy Barnes	Jimmy Barnes; Desmond Child	Two Fires	1990				
"Let's Start with Forever" †	Color Me Badd	—N/a	Time and Chance	1993				
"Letting You Go"	Peter Andre	Brian McKnight	Time	1997				
"Lightin' Up the Night"	Commodores	Jeff Lorber	Nightshift	1985				
"Lights in the City"	Westside cast	—N/a	Westside soundtrack	2018				
"Listen with Your Heart" (Note: an Italian-language version of "Listen with Your Heart", called "Parlami D'Amore", was recorded by Italian singer Giorgia in 1999.)	CeCe Winans	—N/a	Everlasting Love	1998				
"Little Bit of Heaven"	Jerry Rix	—N/a	Jerry Rix Sings Diane Warren - Nothing's Gonna Stop Us Now	1989				
"Little Too Much, Little Too Late"	Mýa	—N/a	Moodring	2003				
"Live for Loving You" †	Gloria Estefan	Gloria Estefan; Emilio Estefan	Into the Light	1991	22	2	33	
"Live on Love" †	Armin van Buuren (featuring My Marianne)			2022				
"Lonely Beat Of My Heart" †	Steve Lukather	Steve Lukather	Lukather	1989				
"Lonely Is The Night" †	Air Supply	Albert Hammond	Hearts in Motion	1986	76	12		
"Look Away" †	Chicago	—N/a	Chicago 19	1988	1	1	77	
"Look No Further" (Note: a French-language version of "Look No Further", called "Décide L'Heure", was recorded by French band Native in 1997.)	Rozalla	—N/a	Look No Further	1995				
"Love Always Finds a Reason"	Glenn Medeiros	Robbie Buchanan	Not Me	1987				
"Love and Understanding" †	Cher	—N/a	Love Hurts	1991	17	3	10	
"Love Can Do That"	Elaine Paige	—N/a	Love Can Do That	1991				
"Love Can Move Mountains" †	Celine Dion	—N/a	Celine Dion	1992	36	8	46	
"Love Cuts Deep"	Michael Bolton	Michael Bolton; Desmond Child	Soul Provider	1989				
"Love Found Me" (Note: a Spanish-language version of "Love Found Me", called "No Cambies Nunca", was included on the 2001 album Chicas Malas by Spanish singer Mónica Naranjo.)	Mónica Naranjo	—N/a	Bad Girls	2002				
"Love Is All That Matters"	Diana Ross	—N/a	Every Day Is a New Day	1999				
"Love Is Like a Drug"	Linda Teodosiu	—N/a	Under Pressure	2009				
"Love is the Power" †	Michael Bolton	Walter Afanasieff; Michael Bolton	This Is The Time: The Christmas Album	1996		11		
"Love Me for Me" †	Jamali	—N/a	Jamali	2004				
"Love Me Like That"	Ella Mai	—N/a	Creed II soundtrack	2018				
"Love on a Rooftop" †	Ronnie Spector	Desmond Child	Unfinished Business	1987				
"Love Will Lead You Back" † (Note: a Portuguese-language version of "Love Will Lead You Back" called "Quem é Você" was recorded by Brazilian singer Robinson Monteiro, a Spanish-language version called "Quien Eres Tu" was recorded by Mexican singer Yuri in 1991, and a Cantonese-language version called “仍是愛你一個” was recorded by Hong Kong singer Sally Yeh in 1991.)	Taylor Dayne	—N/a	Can't Fight Fate	1989	1	1	69	
"Lovin' Proof"	Celine Dion	—N/a	The Colour of My Love	1993				
"Loving You Is All I Know" †	The Pretenders	—N/a	The Other Sister soundtrack	1999		22		
"Make Tonight Beautiful" †	Tamia	—N/a	Speed 2: Cruise Control soundtrack	1997				
"Makin' My Way (Any Way That I Can)" †	Wynonna Judd	—N/a	The Associate soundtrack	1996				
"Mama"	Laura Branigan	Umberto Tozzi; Giancarlo Bigazzi	Branigan 2	1983				
"Me Leve Com Você"	Sandy & Junior	—N/a	Sandy & Junior	2001				
"Miss Me So Bad"	Son by Four	—N/a	Purest of Pain	2000				
"Missing You Now" †	Michael Bolton feat. Kenny G	Michael Bolton; Walter Afanasieff	Time, Love & Tenderness	1991	12	1	28	
"Moonlight Dancing" (Note: a Japanese-language version of "Moonlight Dancing", called "ムーンライト ダンシング", was recorded by American singer Taro Gold in 2010.)	The Pointer Sisters	—N/a	Serious Slammin'	1988				
"More Than Forever"	KRU	—N/a	The Way We Jam	1998				
"Mr. Right Now"	Rori	—N/a	Rori	1985				
"Much Too Much"	Dionne Warwick	—N/a	Friends Can Be Lovers	1993				
"Music of My Heart" †	Gloria Estefan and NSYNC	—N/a	Music of the Heart soundtrack	1999	2	2	34	
"Music of the Sun"	Rihanna	Carl Sturken; Evan Rogers; Robyn Fenty	Music of the Sun	2005				
"My Commitment"	Gary Barlow	Gary Barlow	Open Road	1997				
"My First Night with You"	Deborah Cox	Babyface	Deborah Cox	1995				
"My First Night with You" †	Mýa	Babyface	Mýa	1998	28			
"My Heart Stops" †	Eric Carmen	—N/a	non-album single	1991				
"My Heart's with You"	Air Supply	Graham Russell; Brian MacLeod	Hearts in Motion	1986				
"Nada" †	Belinda	Belinda	Catarsis	2013				
"Naked with You"	Maria Lawson	—N/a	Maria Lawson	2006				
"Near Tears"	Shonagh Daly	—N/a	Beautiful View	2004				
"Need to Be Next to You" †	Leigh Nash	—N/a	Bounce soundtrack	2000		21		
"Never an Easy Way To Break A Heart"	Overground	—N/a	2. OG	2004				
"Never Changing Love"	Shanice	—N/a	21... Ways to Grow	1994				
"Never Dance Again"	Samantha Harvey	—N/a	Please (EP)	2018				
"Never Get Enough of Your Love"	Michael Bolton	Michael Bolton; Walter Afanasieff	The One Thing	1993				
"Never Gonna Break My Heart Again"	Deborah Cox	—N/a	Deborah Cox	1995				
"Never Let a Night Go By"	Joyce Kennedy	—N/a	Wanna Play Your Game!	1985				
"New Fire from an Old Flame"	Miki Howard	—N/a	Femme Fatale	1992				
"New Love"	Michael Bolton	Michael Bolton; Desmond Child	Time, Love & Tenderness	1991				
"Next Plane Out" †	Celine Dion	—N/a	The Colour of My Love	1993				
"Nezha Legend" †	Beijing Angel Choir	—N/a	Ne Zha 2	2025				
"Nice 'N Easy" †	The Real Milli Vanilli	Frank Farian; Robert Rayen; P.G. Wylder	The Moment of Truth	1991				
"No Doubt About It"	Angelo & Veronica	Michael Bolton	Angelo & Veronica	1993				
"No Fool No More" †	En Vogue	—N/a	Why Do Fools Fall in Love soundtrack	1998	57			
"No Known Cure"	Jamali	—N/a	Yours Fatally	2006				
"No Living without Loving You"	Celine Dion	—N/a	The Colour of My Love	1993				
"No Reason in the World" †	Jimmy Harnen	—N/a	Can't Fight the Midnight	1989				
"Not a Dry Eye in the House" †	Meat Loaf	—N/a	Welcome to the Neighbourhood	1995	82		7	
"Not Enough Hours in the Night" †	After 7	—N/a	Beverly Hills, 90210: The College Years soundtrack	1994				
"Not Prepared For You"	Diane Warren and Lauren Jauregui	—N/a	Diane Warren: The Cave Sessions, Vol. 1	2021				
"Not Strong Enough" †	Apocalyptica featuring Brent Smith	—N/a	7th Symphony	2010				
"Note to God"	JoJo	—N/a	The High Road	2006				
"Nothing Broken but My Heart" †	Celine Dion	—N/a	Celine Dion	1992	29	1		
"Nothing Can Keep Me From You"	Kiss	—N/a	Detroit Rock City soundtrack	1999				
"Nothing Hurts Like Love" †	Daniel Bedingfield	—N/a	Second First Impression	2004			3	
"Nothing's Gonna Stop Us Now" (Note: a Greek-language version of "Nothing's Gonna Stop Us Now" called "Kanenas den Mas Stamata" was recorded by Greek singers Alexia and Kostas Haritodiplomenos and included on the 1987 album ALEXIA by Alexia Vassiliou, and a Spanish-language version called "Nadie Nos Va a Detener" was included on the 1998 album Nadie Nos Va a Detener by Puerto Rican pop band Salsa Kids.) †	Starship	Albert Hammond	Mannequin soundtrack	1987	1	1	1	
"Now That I Found You"	Michael Bolton	Michael Bolton	Time, Love & Tenderness	1991				
"Now That You Can't Have Me" †	Cosima De Vito	—N/a	Cosima	2004				
"Numb" †	Pet Shop Boys	—N/a	Fundamental	2006			23	
"Old Motown Music (Radio, Radio)"	René Froger	—N/a	Midnight Man	1990				
"Once in a Lifetime" †	Michael Bolton	Walter Afanasieff; Michael Bolton	Only You soundtrack	1994		15		
"One Day You Will"	Deborah Cox	—N/a	One Wish	1998				
"One in This World"	Haylie Duff	—N/a	A Cinderella Story soundtrack	2004				
"The One I Gave My Heart To" †	Aaliyah	—N/a	One in a Million	1996	9		30	
"One Less Lonely Heart"	Deniece Williams	David Paul Bryant	Water Under the Bridge	1987				
"One Love to Live" †	Stevie Woods	—N/a	The Woman in My Life	1982				
"One More Mountain (Free Again)"	K-Ci & JoJo	—N/a	The Hurricane soundtrack	2000				
"One Night with You (Everyday of Your Life)" (Note: a Russian-language version of "One Night with You (Everyday of Your Life)", called "Noch' bez Tebya", was recorded by Russian singer Dima Bilan in 2004.)	Luther Vandross	—N/a	One Night with You: The Best of Love, Volume 2	1997				
"One Night Without You" †	Cosima De Vito	—N/a	Cosima	2004				
"The One Thing"	Michael Bolton	Michael Bolton; Desmond Child	The One Thing	1993				
"The Ones You Love"	Zendee	—N/a	I Believe	2013				
"The Only Good Thing You Ever Said Was Goodbye"	Joan Jett	Joan Jett; Desmond Child	Notorious	1991				
"Only Love" †	Susanna Hoffs	Susanna Hoffs	When You're a Boy	1991				
"Only Love Can Hurt Like This" †	Paloma Faith	—N/a	A Perfect Contradiction	2014			6	
"Open All Night"	Jerry Rix	Steve Angelica	Jerry Rix Sings Diane Warren - Nothing's Gonna Stop Us Now	1989				
"Ordinary Day" †	Nick Lachey	—N/a	non-album single	2007				
"Other People's Lives" †	Don Johnson	—N/a	Let It Roll	1989				
"Out of My Hands" †	Jennifer Rush	Jon Secada; Miguel A. Morejon	Out of My Hands	1995				
"Overloved"	Raven-Symoné	—N/a	This Is My Time	2004				
"Painfully Beautiful"	Il Volo	—N/a	Il Volo (Special Christmas Edition)	2011				
"Paint it Blue" †	Joe Pasquale	—N/a	Prey	1991				
"Painted on My Heart" †	The Cult	—N/a	Gone in 60 Seconds soundtrack	2000				
"Perfection"	Cher	Desmond Child	Cher	1987				
"Permanent"	Sabrina	—N/a	Sab	2016				
"Places I've Been"	Taylor Hicks	—N/a	Taylor Hicks	2006				
"Please (Dreams)"	Nádine	—N/a	As Jy Wonder	2007				
"Please Remember"	LeAnn Rimes	—N/a	Coyote Ugly soundtrack	2000				
"Pleasure or Pain"	Michael Bolton	Michael Bolton; Tony Rich	All That Matters	1997				
"The Plumbing Song "	Weird Al Yankovic	Frank Farian; Brad Nail	Off the Deep End	1992				
"Power of Persuasion" †	The Pointer Sisters	—N/a	Caddyshack II soundtrack	1988				
"Pray for the Love"	Russell Watson	—N/a	Amore Musica	2004				
"Prayers for This World"	Cher	—N/a	Cries from Syria soundtrack	2017				
"Private Affair"	The Jacksons	—N/a	2300 Jackson Street	1989				
"Private Line"	El DeBarge	—N/a	El DeBarge	1986				
"Reach" (Note: a Portuguese-language version of "Reach", called "Eu Vou Seguir", was included on the 2007 album De Corpo E Alma Outra Vez by Brazilian singer Marina Elali's; and a Spanish-language version called "Puedes Llegar" was included on a 1996 all-Latin ensemble album entitled Voces Unidas, itself the soundtrack to the Olympic Games "Atlanta 1996".) †	Gloria Estefan	Gloria Estefan	Destiny	1996	42	5	15	
"Real" † (Note: a Spanish-language version of "Real", called "No Puedo Estar sin Ti", was recorded by Cuban American singer Jon Secada in 1997.)	Donna Allen	Jon Secada	The Specialist soundtrack	1994			34	
"Real Emotion"	Celine Dion	—N/a	The Colour of My Love	1993				
"Remind My Heart"	Jennifer Rush	—N/a	Passion	1988				
"Rescue"	Uncle Kracker	—N/a	Seventy Two and Sunny	2004				
"Rhythm of the Night" †	DeBarge	—N/a	The Last Dragon soundtrack	1985	3	1	4	
"The Right Kind of Wrong" †	LeAnn Rimes	—N/a	Coyote Ugly soundtrack	2000				
"Rocket"	The Wanted	—N/a	Battleground	2011				
"Rosie" †	Richie Sambora	Jon Bon Jovi; Richie Sambora; Desmond Child	Stranger In This Town	1991				
"Sacred Kiss"	Vince Hill	—N/a	Real Songs (Vince Hill Sings Diane Warren)	2003				
"The Saddest Song I Ever Heard" †	For Real	—N/a	Free	1996				
"Safe Place from the Storm" †	Michael Bolton	Michael Bolton	All That Matters	1997		18		
"The Same Love" †	The Jets	—N/a	Believe	1989	87	15		
"Same Song"	LaKisha Jones	—N/a	So Glad I'm Me	2009				
"Sanity"	Belinda Carlisle	—N/a	Kismet	2023				
"Satisfaction" †	Laura Branigan	Bernd Dietrich; Gerd Grabowski; Engelbert Simons; Mark Spiro	Self Control	1984				
"Save Me" (Note: a Spanish-language version of "Save Me", called "Sola", was recorded by Mexican American singer Byanka in 1990.)	Bonnie Tyler	Albert Hammond	Bitterblue	1991				
"Save Me Tonight"	Mick Jones	Mick Jones; Joe Brooks	Mick Jones	1989				
"Save Up All Your Tears" †	Bonnie Tyler	Desmond Child	Hide Your Heart	1988				
"Saving Forever for You" †	Shanice	—N/a	Beverly Hills, 90210 soundtrack	1992	4		42	
"Say Don't Go" (Note: Originally written in 2013 for the album 1989, the song was not released until 2023 as part of 1989 (Taylor's Version).)	Taylor Swift	Taylor Swift	1989 (Taylor's Version)	2023	5			
"Say What's in My Heart" †	Aaron Neville	Babyface	...To Make Me Who I Am	1997		26		
"Secrets of the Night"	El DeBarge	Albert Hammond	El DeBarge	1986				
"Seaside"	Diane Warren, Rita Ora, Sofía Reyes and Reik	—N/a	Diane Warren: The Cave Sessions, Vol. 1	2021				
"Seen" †	Laura Pausini	—N/a	The Life Ahead soundtrack	2020		19		
"Send Me Someone"	Robbie Buchanan	Robbie Buchanan	Original Demos	2000				
"Set the Night to Music" †	Starship	—N/a	No Protection	1987	—	9	—	—
"Set the Night to Music" †	Roberta Flack with Maxi Priest	—N/a	Set the Night to Music	1991	6	2	—	—
"Shake Ya Body" †	Tyra Banks	—N/a	non-album single	2004				
"Sheltered Heart"	Jerry Rix	—N/a	Jerry Rix Sings Diane Warren - Nothing's Gonna Stop Us Now	1989				
"She's Fire" †	Diane Warren, G-Eazy and Santana	Gerald Gillum	Diane Warren: The Cave Sessions, Vol. 1	2021				
"Shine"	Ashanti	Ashanti	The Declaration	2008				
"Show Me The Way Back To Your Heart" † (Note: a French-language version of "Show Me The Way Back To Your Heart", called "S'Aimer Encore Une Fois", was recorded by Canadian singer Katee Julien in 1995.)	Gloria Estefan	—N/a	Destiny	1996				
"Silent Partners"	Laura Branigan	The Doctor	Self Control	1984				
"Silver Lining (Crazy 'Bout You)" †	Jessie J	—N/a	Silver Linings Playbook soundtrack	2012			100	
"Sincere"	Nadine Renee	—N/a	Nadine	1999				
"Sleep with Me"	Mic Murphy	—N/a	Touch	1991				
"A Smile Like Yours" †	Natalie Cole	—N/a	A Smile Like Yours soundtrack	1997	84	8		
"Sneakin' Suspicions"	Jack Wagner	—N/a	Don't Give Up Your Day Job	1987				
"So Good to Come Home to"	Atlantic Starr	—N/a	Time	1994				
"Solitaire" †	Laura Branigan	Martine Clémenceau	Branigan 2	1983	7	16		
"Some Hearts"	Marshall Crenshaw	—N/a	Good Evening	1989				
"Some Kind of Miracle"	Puff Johnson	—N/a	Miracle	1996				
"Some Kind of Mystery"	Sinoa	—N/a	The Shadow soundtrack	1994				
"Somebody in Your Life"	Peabo Bryson	Robbie Buchanan	Quiet Storm	1986				
"Somebody's Somebody"	Christina Aguilera	—N/a	Christina Aguilera	1999				
"Somehow You Do" †	Reba McEntire	—N/a	Four Good Days soundtrack	2021				
"Someone That You Loved Before" (Note: a French-language version of "Someone That You Loved Before", called "L'Amour T'Aidera", was recorded by French singer Jane Fostin in 1997.)	Eric Carmen	Eric Carmen	Winter Dreams	1997				
"Something to Believe in"	Bill Champlin	Desmond Child; Dean Pitchford	Sing soundtrack	1989				
"Soon" †	LeAnn Rimes	—N/a	I Need You	2001		14		
"Soul of My Soul" †	Michael Bolton	Walter Afanasieff; Michael Bolton	The One Thing	1993			32	
"The Sound of a Breaking Heart"	Jerry Rix	—N/a	Jerry Rix Sings Diane Warren - Nothing's Gonna Stop Us Now	1989				
"Spanish Guitar" † (Note: a Hungarian-language version of "Spanish Guitar", called "Spanyol Gitár", was recorded by Hungarian vocal trio Adagio in 2005.)	Toni Braxton	—N/a	The Heat	2000	98	20		
"Stand in the Fire" †	Mickey Thomas	—N/a	Youngblood soundtrack	1986				
"Stand Up for Something"	Andra Day (featuring Common)	—N/a	non-album single	2017				
"State of Our Affair" †	Stevie Woods	—N/a	Attention	1983				
"State Your Case"	Martina Stavolo	Bob Benozzo	Scialla	2009				
"Statue"	Stanaj	—N/a	The Night Clerk soundtrack	2020				
"Step Up"	Samantha Jade	Jerry Duplessis; Latabia Parker; Marcel Hall; Wyclef Jean	Step Up soundtrack	2006				
"Still Here"	Natasha Bedingfield	—N/a	N.B.	2007				
"Stop Steppin' on My Heart"	Eddie Money	—N/a	Greatest Hits: The Sound of Money	1989				
"Stop Time Tonight"	Ricky Martin	—N/a	Life	2005				
"Strong as Steel" †	Five Star	—N/a	Between the Lines	1987			16	
"Strong, Strong Wind" †	Air Supply	—N/a	The Book of Love	1997				
"Stuck with Each Other" †	Shontelle (featuring Akon)	Rodney Jerkins; Kalenna Harper	Confessions of a Shopaholic soundtrack / Shontelligence	2009			23	
"The Sun Ain't Gonna Shine" †	Four Tops	—N/a	Indestructible	1988			84	
"Superhuman"	Ginuwine	—N/a	The Life	2001				
"Superwoman"	Diane Warren and Céline Dion	—N/a	Diane Warren: The Cave Sessions, Vol. 1	2021				
"Surrender"	O'Bryan	Robbie Nevil	Surrender	1986				
"Sweet"	Diane Warren, Jon Batiste and Pentatonix	—N/a	Diane Warren: The Cave Sessions, Vol. 1	2021				
"Sweet Little Persuader"†	Baton Rouge	—N/a	St. Anne's Wheel	1995				
"Sweetest Sin" †	Jessica Simpson	—N/a	In This Skin	2003				
"Take It to Heart" †	Michael McDonald	Michael McDonald	Take It to Heart	1990	98	4		
"Take Me With You (If You Leave)"	Sandy & Junior	—N/a	Sandy & Junior	2001				
"Taken" †	Nathan Sykes	—N/a	Unfinished Business	2016				
"Takin' Back My Heart" (Note: a French-language version of "Takin' Back My Heart", called "Dans Ce Monde à Part", was recorded by French band Native in 1997.)	Cher	—N/a	Believe	1998				
"Talk Me Into It" †	Glenn Jones	—N/a	Youngblood soundtrack	1986				
"Taste the Tears" † (Note: a Greek-language version of "Taste the Tears", called "Tha Erthi e Stigmi", was recorded by Greek singer Sakis Rouvas in 2002.)	Jason Raize	—N/a	non-album single	1999				
"Tears in the Rain" † (Note: a French-language version of "Tears in the Rain", called "Pleurs Dans la Pluie", was recorded by Canadian singer Mario Pelchat in 1993; and a Dutch-language version called "Wat Ging er Mis Tussen Ons" was recorded by Dutch singer Gerard Joling in 1995.)	Robin Beck	Desmond Child	Trouble or Nothin'	1989				
"Tell It to the Moon" †	Martha Davis	—N/a	Policy	1987				
"Tell Me Where It Hurts"	The Real Milli Vanilli	—N/a	The Moment of Truth	1991				
"That's Not Me" †	Max George	—N/a	non-album single	2020				
"That's When I'll Stop Loving You"	NSYNC	—N/a	No Strings Attached	2000				
"There for Me" (Note: although released as a B-side to "Never Too Far/Hero Medley" in 2001, "There for Me" was written and recorded during sessions for Rainbow in 1999 and was a left-over track.)	Mariah Carey	David Foster; Mariah Carey	B-side to "Never Too Far/Hero Medley"	2001				
"There Is a Love"	Jerry Rix	—N/a	Jerry Rix Sings Diane Warren - Nothing's Gonna Stop Us Now	1989				
"There Is No Heart That Won't Heal"	Taylor Dayne	—N/a	Naked Without You	1998				
"There You'll Be" † (Note: a German-language version of "There You'll Be", called "Ich Lebe Für den Augenblick", was recorded by Lithuanian-German Schlager singer Lena Valaitis in 2001; an Italian-language duet version called "Sarai Qui" was recorded by English singer Sarah Brightman and Italian singer Alessandro Safina in 2008; and a Mandarin Chinese-language version called “排山倒海” was recorded by Taiwanese singer A-mei in 2001.)	Faith Hill	—N/a	Pearl Harbor soundtrack	2001	10	1	3	
"These Are the Special Times"	Celine Dion	—N/a	These Are Special Times	1998				
"These Are the Special Times (Momenti Splendidi)"	Jonathan Antoine	—N/a	Christmasland	2020				
"This Could Take All Night"	Boys Club	—N/a	The Karate Kid Part III soundtrack	1989				
"This is for My Girls" †	Michelle Obama (featuring Kelly Rowland, Missy Elliott, Kelly Clarkson, Zendaya, Janelle Monáe, Lea Michele and Chloe x Halle)	—N/a	non-album single	2016				
"This River" †	Michael Bolton	—N/a	Greatest Hits (1985–1995)	1995				
"Through the Storm"	Albert Hammond	Albert Hammond	Best of Me	1989				
"Thunder in the Night"	Melissa Manchester	Martin Page	Mathematics	1985				
"Ti Amo" †	Laura Branigan	Umberto Tozzi; Giancarlo Bigazzi	Self Control	1984	55	22	100	
"Til It Happens to You" †	Lady Gaga	Lady Gaga	non-album single	2015	95			
"Till Somebody Loves You" †	Henry Lee Summer	—N/a	Way Past Midnight	1991	51			
"Time Alone with You" †	Bad English	John Waite; Jonathan Cain	Backlash	1991				
"A Time for Letting Go"	Michael Bolton	Michael Bolton	The One Thing	1993				
"Times Like This" †	Diane Warren and Darius Rucker	—N/a	Diane Warren: The Cave Sessions, Vol. 1	2021				
"Time Stand Still"	Due Voci	—N/a	Due Voci	2010				
"Time Will"	Patti LaBelle	—N/a	When a Woman Loves	2000				
"Time, Love and Tenderness" †	Michael Bolton	—N/a	Time, Love & Tenderness	1991	7	1	28	
"To Be Lovers"	Jerry Rix	Albert Hammond	Jerry Rix Sings Diane Warren - Nothing's Gonna Stop Us Now	1989				
"To Get Here"	Willie Nelson		The Last Movie Star soundtrack	2018				
"To Get Me To You" †	Lila McCann	—N/a	Hope Floats soundtrack	1998				
"Together"	Mickey Thomas	Paul Chiten; Oleg Gazmanov	Music Speaks Louder Than Words	1990				
"Too Gone, Too Long" †	En Vogue	—N/a	EV3	1997	33		20	
"Too Lost in You" † (Note: a French-language version of "Too Lost in You", called "Quand J'Ai Peur de Tout", was recorded by French singer Patricia Kaas in 1997.)	Sugababes	—N/a	Three	2003			10	
"Too Many Tears, Too Many Times"	Patti LaBelle	—N/a	When a Woman Loves	2000				
"The Touch"	Ricky Martin	Desmond Child	Sound Loaded	2000				
"Treasure"	Sam Bailey	—N/a	The Power of Love	2014				
"Treat Me Right (I'm Yours for Life)"	Joss Stone	—N/a	Music from and Inspired by Desperate Housewives	2005				
"True Believer"	Inessa	—N/a	Introducing...	2002				
"Trust Me I Lie"	Nicole Scherzinger	—N/a	Killer Love	2011				
"The Truth Is In There"	Ally Brooke	—N/a	N/A	2018				
"Tu Amor"	Jon B.	—N/a	Cool Relax	1997				
"Turn On the Night" †	Kiss	Paul Stanley	Crazy Nights	1987			41	
"Twisted" †	Kane Roberts	Desmond Child; Kane Roberts	Saints and Sinners	1991				
"U Can't Touch Me"	C-Stones	—N/a	Makin' My Way	2003				
"Un-Break My Heart" (Note: Braxton also recorded a Spanish-language version of "Un-Break My Heart", called "Regresa a Mi", which was included on the deluxe edition of the album on which the official version appeared. Another Spanish-language version of this song, called "Libérame", was included on the album 1999 album Perlas by Spanish singer Paloma San Basilio. A Portuguese-language version of this song, called "Volta Pra Mim", was recorded by vocal group Il Divo. A French-language version of this song, called "Reste Avec Moi", was included on the 1998 album Son Grand Numéro by French singer Mireille Mathieu. A Russian-language version of this song, called "Sedrtse ne Plach", was recorded by Alla Gorbachova.) †	Toni Braxton	—N/a	Secrets	1996	1	1	2	
"Unchained"	Silent Rage	—N/a	Still Alive	2002				
"Under Any Moon" †	Glenn Medeiros and The Jets	—N/a	The Karate Kid Part III soundtrack	1989				
"Unfair"	Josh Kelley	—N/a	Special Company	2008				
"Unfinished Songs"	Celine Dion	—N/a	Loved Me Back to Life	2013				
"Uninvited Guest"	Disturbed	Dan Donegan; Mike Wengren; David Draiman; John Moyer	Evolution	2018				
"Un roman d'amitié (Friend You Give Me a Reason)" †	Glenn Medeiros and Elsa Lunghini	Didier Barbelivien; Robbie Buchanan	Not Me	1987				
"Unsaid"	Meat Loaf	—N/a	B-side to "Couldn't Have Said It Better"	2003				
"Un Sens à Ma Vie"	Native	—N/a	Laura Mayne-Kerbrat	2002				
"Unspoken Love" †	Paul Michiels	—N/a	The Inner Child	1998				
"Until U Love U"	Nicole Scherzinger	—N/a	Doll Domination	2008				
"Useless"	Greta's Bakery	—N/a	The Edge of Everything	2010				
"The Voice of My Heart"	Michael Bolton	—N/a	The One Thing	1993				
"Wake You Up with Kisses"	Khris Kellow	—N/a	Diane Warren: A Passion For Music	1997				
"Walk Away" † (Note: a French-language version of "Walk Away", called "Quitte-Moi", was recorded by Canadian singer Mario Pelchat in 1993.)	Michael Bolton	Michael Bolton	The Hunger	1987		14		
"Was It Something I Didn't Say" †	98 Degrees	—N/a	98 Degrees	1998				
"Water from the Moon" †	Celine Dion	—N/a	Celine Dion	1992		11		
"We All Fall Down"	Aerosmith	—N/a	Music from Another Dimension!	2012				
"(We All Are) Looking for Home"	Leona Lewis	—N/a	—N/a	2016				
"We Can" †	LeAnn Rimes	—N/a	Legally Blonde 2: Red, White & Blonde soundtrack	2003		16	27	
"We Don't Know How to Say Goodbye" †	Clive Griffin	—N/a	Clive Griffin	1993				
"We're Not Makin' Love Anymore" †	Barbra Streisand	Michael Bolton	A Collection: Greatest Hits... and More	1989		10	85	
"What Are You Doing with a Fool Like Me" †	Joe Cocker	—N/a	Joe Cocker Live	1990	96			
"What Do I Do with the Love"	Dru Hill	—N/a	Enter the Dru	1998				
"What If"	Brenda K. Starr	—N/a	By Heart	1991				
"What If It Was You"	The 411	—N/a	Between the Sheets	2004				
"What If We Never"	Kristin Chenoweth	—N/a	Some Lessons Learned	2011				
"What Is My Heart to Do"	Blake	—N/a	Start Over	2012				
"What Kind of World Would This World Be"	Cosima De Vito	—N/a	Cosima	2004				
"What My Heart Says"	Monica	—N/a	All Eyez on Me	2002				
"What We Leave Behind"	Labrinth	—N/a	Miss You Already soundtrack	2015				
"When a Woman Loves"	Patti LaBelle	—N/a	When a Woman Loves	2000				
"When I Die"	The Real Milli Vanilli	Frank Farian; Peter Bischof-Fallenstein; Dietmar Kawohl	The Moment of Truth	1991				
"When I See You Smile" †	Bad English	—N/a	Bad English	1989	1	11	61	
"When I'm Back on My Feet Again" †	Michael Bolton	—N/a	Soul Provider	1989	7	1	44	
"When I'm Not Around"	Kimberly Caldwell	—N/a	Without Regret	2010				
"When It's Real"	Kathy Brier	—N/a	Heartbreaker	2006				
"When Love Goes Right"	Stevie Woods	—N/a	The Woman in My Life	1982				
"When Lovers Become Strangers" †	Cher	—N/a	Love Hurts	1991		15		
"When the Night Comes" †	Joe Cocker	Bryan Adams; Jim Vallance	One Night of Sin	1989	11	12	65	
"When We Dance Slow"	Diane Warren and Luis Fonsi	—N/a	Diane Warren: The Cave Sessions, Vol. 1	2021				
"When Words Won't Come"	Didrik Solli-Tangen	—N/a	Guilty Pleasures	2010				
"When You Cry"	Faith Hill	—N/a	Touched by an Angel: The Album	1998				
"When You Walk Away"	Cher	—N/a	Living Proof	2001				
"When Your Eyes Say It"	Britney Spears	—N/a	Oops!... I Did It Again	2000				
"Whenever You Close Your Eyes" † (Note: a Spanish-language version of "Whenever You Close Your Eyes", called "Tan Dentro de Ti", was recorded by Brazilian pop duo Sandy & Junior in 2006.)	Tommy Page	Michael Bolton	From the Heart	1991				
"Whenever You Remember" (Note: a Chinese-language version, called "忘不了你(Can't Forget You)", was recorded by mainland China singer Sun Nan in 2007.)	Carrie Underwood	—N/a	Some Hearts	2005				
"Where Do I Go from Here"	Erica Mena	—N/a	—N/a	2013				
"Where Do I Go from You?" †	Jon Secada	—N/a	Heart, Soul & a Voice	1994		36		
"Where Is My Angel"	Lina Santiago	—N/a	Feels So Good	1996				
"Where Is Your Heart"	Diane Warren and John Legend	—N/a	Diane Warren: The Cave Sessions, Vol. 1	2021				
"Where My Heart Will Take Me" (Note: "Where My Heart Will Take Me" is a reworked version of "Faith of the Heart".)	Russell Watson	—N/a	Encore	2002				
"Where the Dream Takes You" (Note: a Portuguese-language version of "Where the Dream Takes You", called "Junto Com Teu Sonho", was recorded by Brazilian singer Deborah Blando in 2001; an Italian-language version, called "Segui i Sogni", was recorded by Italian band Gazosa; and a Cantonese-language version, called "隨夢飛行", was recorded by Hong Kong singer Joey Yung in 2001.) †	Mýa	James Newton Howard	Atlantis: The Lost Empire soundtrack	2001				
"Where Were You" †	Little America	Mike Magrisi; Andy Logan	Best of Me	1989				
"Wherever Would I Be" †	Cheap Trick	—N/a	Busted	1990	50			
"Who Says You Can't Have It All"	Dionne Bromfield	—N/a	StreetDance 2 soundtrack	2012				
"Who Will You Run To" †	Heart	—N/a	Bad Animals	1987	7		30	
"Why Did You Do That?"	Lady Gaga	Lady Gaga; Mark Nilan Jr.; Nick Monson; Paul Blair	A Star is Born soundtrack	2018				
"Why Did You Have To Be"	Debelah Morgan	—N/a	Osmosis Jones soundtrack	2001				
"Why Did You Stop Loving Me"	C-Stones	—N/a	Friday Night Forever	2005				
"Why Do We Hurt Each Other"	Patti LaBelle	—N/a	When a Woman Loves	2000				
"Why Goodbye"	Peabo Bryson	—N/a	Through the Fire	1994				
"Wild Is the Wind"	Bon Jovi	Jon Bon Jovi; Richie Sambora; Desmond Child	New Jersey	1988				
"Wishing on the Same Star" † (Note: a Spanish-language version of "Wishing on the Same Star", called "Mi Primer Amor", is recorded by Puerto Rican singer Chayanne in 1992.)	Keedy	—N/a	Chase the Clouds	1991	86			
"With These Hands"	Oscar De La Hoya	—N/a	Oscar de la Hoya	2000				
"Without a Net" †	Mickey Guyton	—N/a	Stuntwomen: The Untold Hollywood Story soundtrack	2020				
"Won't Let You Go"	Avril Lavigne	Avril Lavigne	unreleased song	2011				
"Words to Love By"	Joe Turano	—N/a	Diane Warren: A Passion For Music	1997				
"Work Me Down"	Laura Hunter	David Paul Bryant	Disorderlies soundtrack	1987				
"World Without You" †	Belinda Carlisle	—N/a	Heaven on Earth	1987			34	
"World's Gone Crazy"	Mary J. Blige	—N/a	—N/a	2016				
"Would I Know" (Note: originally recorded by Canadian singer Celine Dion as a left-over track for All The Way...A Decade Of Song in 1999; a French-language version of "Would I Know", called "Tellement Beau", was recorded by French singer Chimène Badi in 2006.)	Charlotte Church	—N/a	I'll Be There soundtrack	2003				
"Wrap U Around Me"	Sean Kingston	—N/a	Tomorrow	2009				
"Wreck You"	Kristin Chenoweth	—N/a	Some Lessons Learned	2011				
"Wrong Turn"	Lucas Prata	—N/a	Never Stop Dreamin'	2008				
"Yo Estare"	Santana featuring Ally Brooke	Claudia Brant	TBA	2022				
"You Already Did"	Nádine	—N/a	As Jy Wonder	2007				
"You and the Moon"	D.A. Wallach	—N/a	Time Machine	2015				
"You Are My Heaven"	Tommy Page	—N/a	From the Heart	1991				
"You Are My Home" (Note: Williams and Chayanne also recorded a Spanish-language version of "You Are My Home", called "Refugio de Amor", which was also included on the soundtrack.) †	Vanessa Williams and Chayanne	—N/a	Dance with Me: Music from the Motion Picture	1998				
"You Can't Break a Broken Heart"	Kate Voegele	—N/a	Don't Look Away	2008				
"You Can't Fight Fate" (Note: a French-language version of "You Can't Fight Fate", called "Rien Changer", was recorded by Canadian singer Mario Pelchat in 1993.)	Taylor Dayne	—N/a	Can't Fight Fate	1989				
"You Can't Lose Me"	O-Town	—N/a	O2	2002				
"You Didn't Have to Hurt Me"	Innosense	—N/a	So Together	2000				
"You Don't Have the Right"	The Saturdays	—N/a	Living for the Weekend	2013				
"You Go First"	Diane Warren and James Arthur	—N/a	Diane Warren: The Cave Sessions, Vol. 1	2021				
"You Got Me"	Gavin DeGraw	—N/a	Dolphin Tale 2 soundtrack Finest Hour: The Best of Gavin DeGraw	2014				
"You Haven't Seen the Last of Me" †	Cher	—N/a	Burlesque soundtrack	2010				
"You Kind of Beautiful"	Diane Warren and Jimmie Allen	—N/a	Diane Warren: The Cave Sessions, Vol. 1	2021				
"You Knew Me When"	Leona Lewis	—N/a	I Am	2015				
"(You Make Me) Rock Hard" †	Kiss	Paul Stanley; Desmond Child	Smashes, Thrashes & Hits	1988				
"You Move Me"	Francisca	—N/a	In My Own Way	2004				
"You Pulled Me Through"	Jennifer Hudson	—N/a	Jennifer Hudson	2008				
"You Redeem Me"	Ace Young	—N/a	Ace Young	2008				
"You Stay With Me"	Ricky Martin	—N/a	Ricky Martin	1999				
"You Were Loved"	Whitney Houston	—N/a	The Preacher's Wife soundtrack	1996				
"You Will (The OWN Song)" †	Jennifer Hudson and Jennifer Nettles	—N/a	non-album single	2015				
"You Wouldn't Know Love" †	Cher	Michael Bolton	Heart of Stone	1989			55	
"You'll Never Stand Alone"	Whitney Houston	—N/a	My Love Is Your Love	1998				
"You're Right, I Was Wrong"	Meat Loaf	—N/a	Couldn't Have Said It Better	2003				
"You're the Story of My Life" (Note: a Spanish-language version of "You're the Story of My Life", called "Mi Historia", was recorded by Mexican singer Flavio César in 1995.) †	Desmond Child	Desmond Child	Discipline	1991	74	29		
"You're Where I Belong" †	Trisha Yearwood	—N/a	Stuart Little soundtrack	1999				
"You've Learned To Live Without Me"	Sheena Easton	—N/a	My Cherie	1995				
"Yahweh"	The Hoppers	—N/a	The Hoppers	1998				
"Your Baby Never Looked Good in Blue" † (Note: a Cantonese-language version, called “七分愛情三分騙”, was recorded by Hong Kong singer Priscilla Chan in 1992.)	Exposé	—N/a	What You Don't Know	1989	17	9		
"Your Heart Is Safe with Me"	LFO	—N/a	LFO	1999				
"Your Heart's in Good Hands"	Al Green	—N/a	Your Heart's in Good Hands	1995				
"Your Kiss Can't Lie"	Francisca	—N/a	In My Own Way	2004				
"Your Letter" †	112	Kris Kellow	Room 112	1998				
"Your Lover"	C-Stones	—N/a	Makin' My Way	2003				
"Your Obsession"	Joanna	—N/a	This Crazy Life	2006				
