= When a Woman Loves =

When a Woman Loves may refer to:

- When a Woman Loves (1915 film), cast including Emmy Wehlen
- When a Woman Loves (film), a 1950 film directed by Wolfgang Liebeneiner
- When a Woman Loves (Patti LaBelle album), 2000
- When a Woman Loves (Jaki Graham album), 2018
- "When a Woman Loves" (song), released in 2010 by R. Kelly
