= JKH =

JKH may refer to:

- Chios Island National Airport's IATA codes
- John Keells Holdings
- JKH Entertainment, record label for C-Note
