= Tilky Jones =

American actor and singer (born 1981)

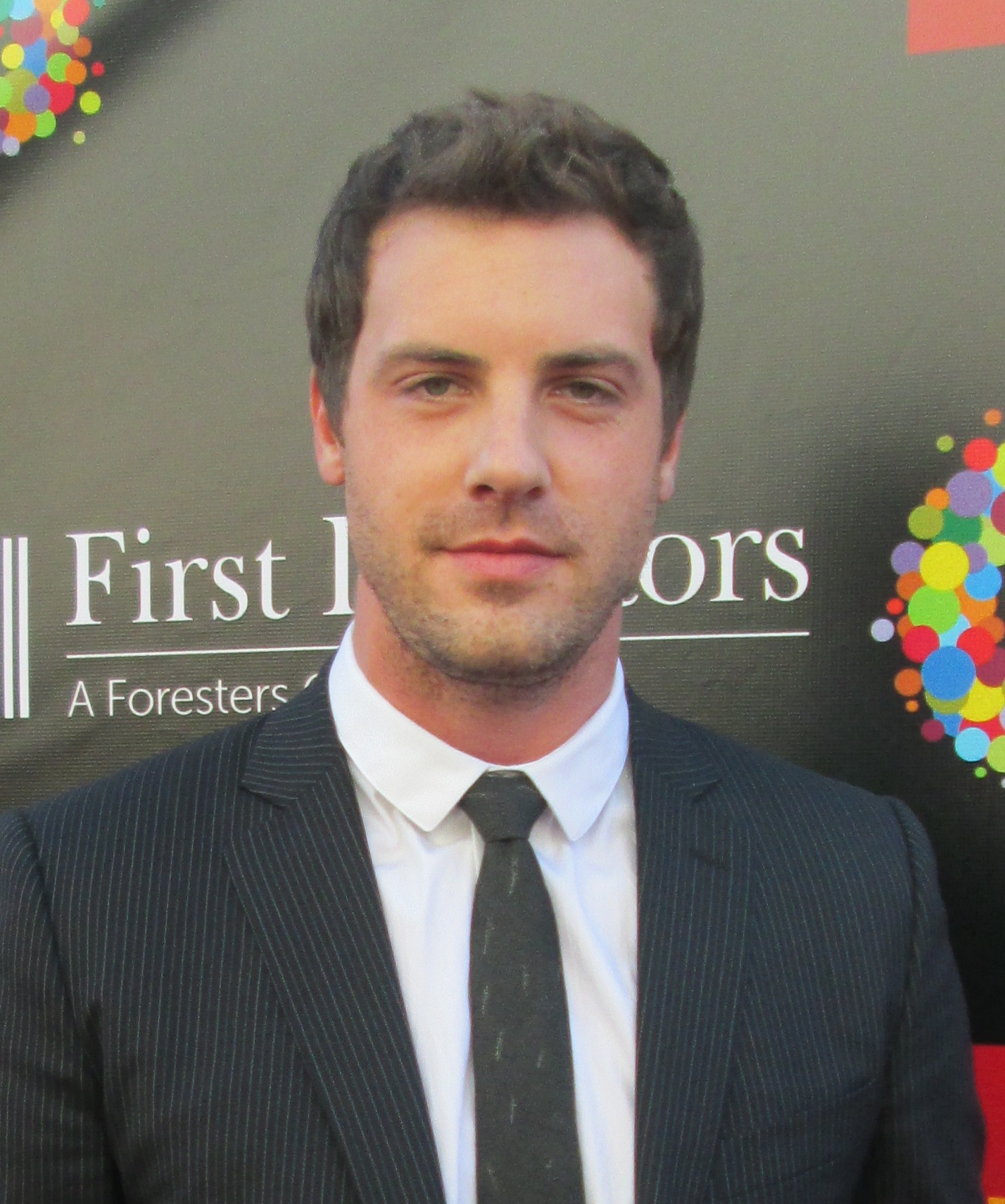
- Jones in 2013.
- Born: Tilky Montgomery Jones; June 24, 1981 (age 45); Charleston, South Carolina, U.S.
- Occupations: Actor, musician
- Years active: 1994–present

Tilky Montgomery Jones (born June 24, 1981) is an American actor and singer. He was a member of the band Take 5 from 1997 to 2001.

== Life and career ==
Jones was born Tilky Montgomery Jones on June 24, 1981, in Charleston, South Carolina and raised in Vero Beach, Florida. At the age of 11 he began acting in equity productions at Riverside Theatre and was the youngest attendee to be accepted into the Broadway Musical Theatre Project of Tampa, co-founded by Ann Reinking. Tilky then moved on to acting in national commercials, and received his SAG card by the age of 13. At 15 his agent presented him with a unique opportunity to join the boy band Take 5, spearheaded by Lou Pearlman, the creator of Back Street Boys and N’SYNC. After the breakup of his band, Take 5. Between 2003 and 2007, he made three appearances on CW television series One Tree Hill, in three different roles. In 2010, it was announced that he would join the television pilot of Single Ladies, and played the role of K.C. in its 2011 season.

On January 13, 2011, it was confirmed that Jones would portray Logan Reed on the ABC Family original television series Pretty Little Liars.

Jones played Sean Butler, the love interest of Hayden Panettiere's character Juliette Barnes, on the ABC drama series Nashville in the first Season from 2012 to 2013.

== Filmography ==
=== Films ===
Year	Title	Role
1994	Lost Island	Jay
2006	The Guardian	Tilky Flint
2008	Never Back Down	Eric
2010	Every Day	Ian
2014	Naughty & Nice	Pepper Sterling
2016	The Wrong House	Brian
2016	Open Marriage	Ron
2018	Paved New World	Daryl
2020	The Charm of Love	Fitz
2025	Straw	Officer Oliver

=== Television ===
Year	Title	Role	Notes
2000	Long Shot	himself	reality TV series
2003–2007	One Tree Hill	Max	Recurring role
2011	Single Ladies	K.C.	Recurring
2011	Pretty Little Liars	Logan Reed	Recurring
2012	Nashville	Sean Butler	Recurring
2014	Naughty & Nice	Pepper Sterling	TV movie
2016	The Wrong House	Brian Lassiter	TV movie
2016	A Father's Secret	Stephen	TV movie
2017	Open Marriage	Ron	TV movie
2017	Second Chance Christmas	Jack	TV movie
2018	He's Watching	Kyle Miller	TV movie
2019	Fatal Getaway	James	TV movie
2019	Christmas Love Letter	Ian McCallister	TV movie
2020	My Sister is So Gay	Beau	TV series
2020	Le festival de l’amour	Fitz	TV movie
2024	Shrinking	Donny	TV series
