= Nikki DeLoach =

American actress (born 1979)

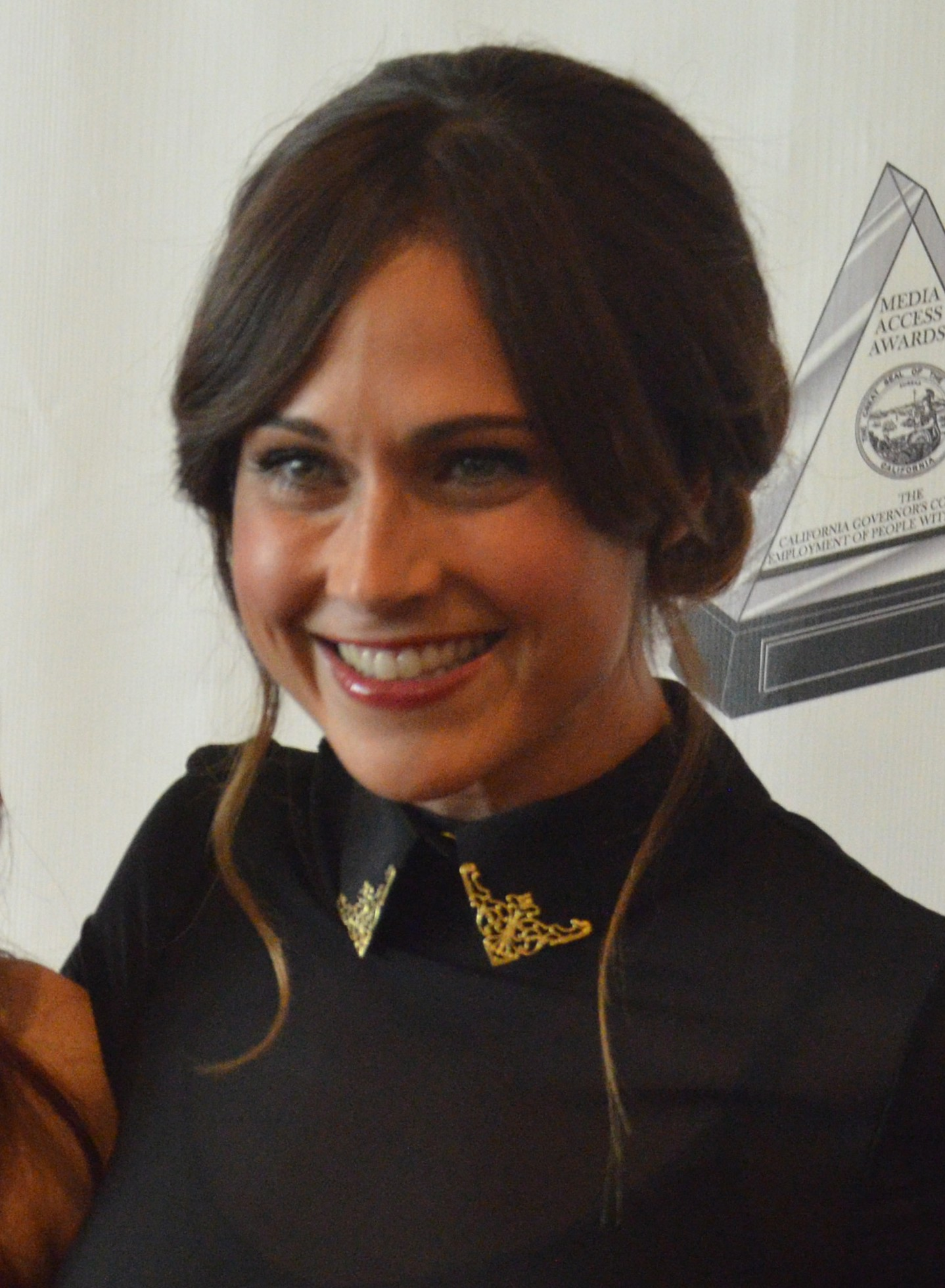
- DeLoach at the Media Access Awards in October 2012
- Born: September 9, 1979 (age 46); Waycross, Georgia, U.S.
- Occupation: Actress
- Years active: 1993–present
- Spouse: Ryan Goodell (m. 2009)
- Children: 2

Nikki DeLoach (born September 9, 1979) is an American actress, best known as Lacey Hamilton in Awkward (2011–2016), MJ in North Shore (2004–2005), and Brenda in Days of Our Lives (2007–2009).

== Early life ==
DeLoach was born in Waycross, Georgia, the eldest of three children of David DeLoach, the owner of a wood products company, and Terri DeLoach, the superintendent of the schools in Pierce County. She has a sister and a brother. They grew up on a farm.

As a child, DeLoach was involved in the pageant world, winning numerous state and national titles. She secured an agent for modeling at a young age and appeared in several print advertisements. She and her mother spent a summer in New York City to further her modeling career.

== Career ==
Deloach joined The All New Mickey Mouse Club in 1993. Fellow cast members included future actors Keri Russell and Ryan Gosling, and future pop stars Britney Spears, Christina Aguilera, Justin Timberlake, and JC Chasez. When The All New Mickey Mouse Club was canceled in 1995, DeLoach returned to her local high school for a short time before moving with her grandmother to Los Angeles to pursue an acting career. Her work included television appearances in Misery Loves Company and movie roles in Gunfighter's Moon and Traveller.

In 1998, she became a member of the girl group Innosense. The group was managed by Justin Timberlake's mother, Lynn Harless. Innosense was an opening act for both *NSYNC and Britney Spears, and it had lukewarm success in Europe, but minimal impact in the US. The group had a cameo in the film Longshot before calling it quits in 2003.

After Innosense's breakup, DeLoach focused on acting. Her film work includes the sequel of the Sandra Bullock thriller The Net, called The Net 2.0, and a role in the series Emerald Cove, alongside some of her fellow Mouseketeers. On television, she starred in the series North Shore. on Fox and Windfall. She also has made guest appearances in Grounded for Life, Walker: Texas Ranger, Cold Case, and CSI: NY. DeLoach played Lacey Hamilton, the mother of the main character Jenna Hamilton, on MTV's Awkward.

She played in the French comedy film Hollywoo with Florence Foresti. She occasionally co-hosts on The Young Turks livestream. She has starred in several films on the Hallmark Channel.

== Personal life ==
DeLoach married Ryan Goodell, who was a member of the boy band Take 5, in September 2009. In April 2013, DeLoach announced that she was pregnant. They have two children.

== Filmography ==
=== Film ===
Year	Title	Role	Notes
1995	Gunfighter's Moon	Kristen Yarnell	
1996	Never Give Up: The Jimmy V Story	-	TV movie
1997	Traveller	Kate	
2001	Longshot	Innosense	
2006	The Net 2.0	Hope Cassidy	Video
2008	The House Bunny	Tall Blonde Girl	
2008	An American Carol	Lily	
2010	Flying Lessons	Mila	
2010	The River Why	Young Ma	
2010	The Trial	Mindy	
2010	Love & Other Drugs	Christy	
2011	Maskerade	Jennifer	
2011	Answers to Nothing	Georgia	
2011	Hollywoo	Jennifer Marshall	
2012	A Golden Christmas 3	Julia	TV movie
2013	Blood Moon	Melinda	Short
2013	The Devil's in the Details	Claire	
2013	Saving Norman	Belinda	Short
2013	Another Happy Anniversary	Jeanne	Short
2013	The Hunted	Ashlee	
2014	Ricky Robot Arms	Bre	Short
2015	You Cast A Spell On Me	Sara Kane	TV movie
2015	Christmas Land	Jules Cooper	TV movie (Hallmark Channel)
2016	A Dream of Christmas	Penny	TV movie (Hallmark Channel)
2016	The Jury	Haley	TV movie
2016	The After War	Jennifer	Short
2017	The Perfect Catch	Jessica	TV movie (Hallmark Channel)
2018	Truly, Madly, Sweetly	Natalie Morgan	TV movie (Hallmark Channel)
2018	Reunited at Christmas	Samantha Murphy	TV movie (Hallmark Channel)
2019	Love to the Rescue	Kate Healy	TV movie (Hallmark Channel)
2019	Love Takes Flight	Dr Lizzie Beauman	TV movie (Hallmark Channel)
2019	Two Turtle Doves	Sharon Harper	TV movie (Hallmark Channel)
2020	Sweet Autumn	Maggie Murphy	TV movie (Hallmark Channel)
2020	Cranberry Christmas	Dawn Powell	TV movie (Hallmark Channel)
2021	Taking The Reins	Samantha Barclay	TV movie (Hallmark Channel)
2021	Five More Minutes	Clara Bingham	TV movie (Hallmark Channel)
2022	Curious Caterer: Dying for Chocolate	Goldy Berry	TV movie (Hallmark Movies & Mysteries)
2022	The Gift of Peace	Traci Fremont	TV movie (Hallmark Movies & Mysteries)
2023	Curious Caterer: Grilling Season	Goldy Berry	TV movie (Hallmark Movies & Mysteries)
2023	Curious Caterer: Fatal Vows	Goldy Berry	TV movie (Hallmark Movies & Mysteries)
2023	A World Record Christmas	Marissa Parsons	TV movie (Hallmark Movies & Mysteries)
2024	True Justice: Family Ties	Professor Ambrose	TV movie (Hallmark Movies & Mysteries)
2024	Curious Caterer: Foiled Plans Curious Caterer: Forbidden Fruit	Goldy Berry	TV movie (Hallmark Movies & Mysteries)
2024	Our Holiday Story	Nell	TV movie (Hallmark Channel)
2025	Home Turf	Cassidy	TV movie (Hallmark Channel)
2025	A Grand Ole Opry Christmas	Gentry Wade	TV movie (Hallmark Channel)
2026	The Greek Aisle	Georgia	TV movie (Hallmark Channel)

=== Television ===
Year	Title	Role	Notes
1993–1995	The All New Mickey Mouse Club	Herself	Main cast: Seasons 6–7
1995	Misery Loves Company	Tracy	Main cast
1997	Walker, Texas Ranger	Jessica Curtis	Episode: "Mayday"
2004–05	North Shore	Mary Jeanne "MJ" Bevans	Main cast
2005	Grounded for Life	Chrissy	Episode: "Oh, What a Knight"
2006	Windfall	Sunny van Hattem	Main cast
2006	CSI: NY	Lorelie Dennis	Episode: "Murder Sings the Blues"
2007	Cold Case	Tessie Bartram (1982)	Episode: "Justice"
2007–09	Days of Our Lives	Brenda	Regular Cast
2008	Without a Trace	Lacey Moran	Episode: "A Dollar and a Dream"
2011	The Defenders	Amanda	Episode: "Morelli v. Kaczmarek"
2011	Traffic Light	Alisha	Episode: "Help Wanted"
2011–16	Awkward.	Lacey Hamilton	Main cast
2012	Ringer	Shaylene Briggs	Recurring cast
2013	CSI: Crime Scene Investigation	Heather Conner	Episode: "Fearless"
2014	Major Crimes	Corporal Laura Day	Episode: "Letting It Go"
2014	NCIS	A.L.C. Maya Leland	Episode: "The Searchers"
2014	The Exes	Katie Drake	Episode: "An Officer and a Dental Man"
2014	Criminal Minds	Audrey Hansen	Episode: "Amelia Porter"
2015	Sirens	Sheila	Episode: "All the Single Ladies"
2015	Castle	Annie Klein	Episode: "Habeas Corpse"
2015	Mad Men	Cheryl	Episode: "Time & Life"
2015	The Player	Monica Capello	Episode: "The Big Blind"
2015	Grey's Anatomy	Charlotte	Episode: "Things We Lost in the Fire"
2016	HelLA	Nikki	Episode: "House Sitting in LA"
2021	9-1-1	Janell Hansen	Episode: "The New Abnormal"
2025	Girl at a Bar	Heather	3 episodes
