= Longshot (film) =

2001 film by Lionel C. Martin

- DVD cover.
- Directed by: Lionel C. Martin
- Written by: Tony DeCamillis; Louis Pearlman
- Produced by: Louis Pearlman; Tony DeCamillis; Lionel C. Martin
- Starring: Paul Sorvino; Hunter Tylo; Antonio Sabato Jr.; Ellen Albertini Dow; Tony DeCamillis
- Cinematography: Sergio Arguello
- Edited by: William Young
- Music by: Lalo Schifrin
- Production company: Transcontinental Pictures
- Distributed by: VMI Releasing
- Release date: October 25, 2001
- Running time: 93 minutes
- Country: United States
- Language: English
- Budget: $20.3 million

Longshot is a 2001 American comedy film directed by Lionel C. Martin, and co-written by Lou Pearlman, as a promotional tool to promote the acting debuts of his succession of successful boybands and girl groups, such as NSYNC, O-Town and Natural, as well as singer Britney Spears, girlband Innosense and pop-hip hop trio LFO, all of whom had cameo appearances in the film, as Pearlman had worked with all of them during the late 1990s and early 2000s. Hunter Tylo, Paul Sorvino Antonio Sabato Jr., Zachery Ty Bryan, and Kenny Rogers star in the film and Spears has a cameo.

The plot recounts the tale of a young boy, Alex Taylor, who gets caught up in his brother's activities as a gigolo, and uses each of the said pop acts as a tool within the film.

== Plot ==
Alex Taylor lives in Los Angeles with his older brother, Jack, who works as a personal fitness trainer and sometime gigolo. Alex's classmates begin to harass him after he misses the game-winning shot at the end of one of his high school's basketball games. Meanwhile, Laszlo Pryce, a rich and corrupt businessman, discovers Jack's affair with his wife (Mitzi Martin). Laszlo threatens to kill Jack and Alex unless Jack travels to New York City to seduce a widow named Rachel Montgomery. On the verge of selling her company, Laszlo wants Jack to relay any inside information he can discover about the impending transaction. Fearing for his younger brother's life, Jack brings Alex with him on the trip. The con begins to unravel when Rachel and Jack fall for each other while Alex similarly falls for Rachel's daughter, Kelly. Jack reveals to Rachel why he's in New York, and the two conspire to expose Pryce. Rachel, though, needs to raise two million dollars to save her company. In a stroke of luck, Alex wins a contest to shoot a halftime, half-court shot. He makes it, Rachel keeps her company, Laszlo is arrested, and everyone lives happily ever after.

== Cast ==
- Tony DeCamillis as Jack Taylor
- Hunter Tylo as Rachel Montgomery
- Joey Sculthorpe as Alex Taylor
- Paul Sorvino as Laszlo Pryce
- Antonio Sabato Jr. as Tommy Sutton
- Jessica Wesson as Kelly Montgomery
- Tara Davis as Vicky Thompson
- Gilbert Gottfried as Mr. Chadwick
- Ellen Albertini Dow as Mrs. Fleisher
- Zachery Ty Bryan as Deke
- Danielle Fishel as Gloria
- Jeremy Wieand as Chip
- Louis J. Pearlman as Captain Lewis
- Mitzi Martin as Mrs. Pryce
- Colin Bain as Hundel
- NSYNC^{1}
- Britney Spears as Flight Attendant
- Kenny Rogers as Pilot
- Harry "K.C." Wayne Casey as Co-Pilot
- Darrin Dewitt Henson as Male Flight Attendant
- Dwayne Johnson as The Mugger
- O-Town^{2}
- LFO^{3}
- Innosense^{4}
- Take 5^{5}
- C-Note^{6}
- Kevin Eubanks as Jazz Club Performer
- Marvin "Smitty" Smith as Jazz Club Performer
- Charnett Moffett as Jazz Club Performer
- Full Force^{7}
- Michael Tylo as CEO
- Dustin Diamond as Waiter
- Jermaine Jackson as himself
- Kelly Rutherford as herself
- Traci Bingham as herself
- Lark Voorhies as herself
- Marc Piacenza as himself
- Mark Breland as himself
- Art Garfunkel as himself
- Kim Garfunkel as herself
- James Garfunkel as himself
- Stacey Murray as herself
- Jerod Mixon as himself
- Jamal Mixon as himself
- Yolanda "Yo-Yo" Whittaker as herself
- Chick Hearn as Announcer
- Robert "Kool" Bell as Announcer
- JoJo Wright as Announcer
- Cubby Bryant as Stock Reporter
- Brett Rice as Older Valet
- Lynn Harless as Country Club Patron
- Ron Yuan as Friend #4
- Carrie Stevens as Waitress
- Joel Redlin as Chippendales Usher
- Lou Pearlman as Captain Lewis

== Soundtrack ==
The soundtrack to the film was released on March 5, 2002, via Transcontinental Records. The album features brand new recordings from NSYNC and O-Town specifically for the film.

1. "Feel the Love" - NSYNC
2. "Me (Boom Shelak, Lak, Boom)" - LFO
3. "See You Again" - O-Town
4. "Put Your Arms Around Me" - Natural
5. "Let's Get this Party Started" - Take 5
6. "Wishing on Every Star" - Innosense
7. "So Often" - C-Note
8. "It Don't Bother Me" - Brizz
9. "She's a Mystery" - Becker
10. "In and Out" - Ali Dee
11. "I Just Wanna (Be with You)" - Bon Voyage
12. "Happy" - Keli Michaels
13. "Fall in Love" - Nichole Carter
14. "A Reason to Love Me" - Joey Sculthorpe
15. "Longshot Theme" - Lalo Schifrin
16. "Longshot Theme" (Remix) - Lalo Schifrin
- "Comatose" and "All Around" - Jaymeer were used in the chase scene.

== Production ==
About one-third of the film was service-produced in Toronto, which doubled up as New York City within the film, under contract with The Danforth Studios Ltd, a subsidiary of SpaceWorks Entertainment Inc. The film was a complete commercial failure, taking in nowhere near the $20 million it cost to film. The film was also panned by critics, who said that many of the pop acts who appeared in the film later claimed to have only appeared due to the amount of pay they would receive for a cameo appearance.

Earlier on, the film was known as Jack of All Trades.

== Release ==
Longshot was released in theatres on October 25, 2001 in Germany, where all of Pearlman's boy bands had enjoyed success long before their international debuts. It was never released to theaters in United States, instead being shown on ABC Family as a television movie, and was later released on March 26, 2002 on DVD and VHS. The film was also packaged with copies of Crossroads, a film which starred Spears, in selected FYE stores in the United States.

International rights to the film are currently handled by VMI Releasing (partly owned by Vantage Media).
