= Timeless Journey =

Studio album by Patti LaBelle
- Released: May 4, 2004
- Length: 50:11
- Label: Def Soul Classics; Def Jam
- Producer: Babyface; Dinky Bingham; Gordon Chambers; The Corner Boys; Makhosini Omari Dlamini; Jonathan DeLise; Sheldon Goode; Darren Henson; David Ivory; Jimi Kendrixx; Matt McCarrin; Sami McKinney; PAJAM; Keith Pelzer; K.C. Porter; Jason Rome; Bunny Sigler; Shawn Smith; Troy Taylor

Patti LaBelle chronology
When a Woman Loves (2000)	Timeless Journey (2004)	Classic Moments (2005)

Timeless Journey is a studio album by American singer Patti LaBelle. Her first release with Def Soul Classics, it was released on May 4, 2004, in the United States. One of her most commercially successful albums, it reached number five on the US Billboard Top R&B/Hip-Hop Albums, also hitting the top 20 on the Billboard 200. Timeless Journey produced the singles "New Day" and "2 Steps Away".

== Background ==
By 2002, Patti LaBelle had been with MCA Records for seventeen years. The label had helped to increase LaBelle's popularity with both pop and R&B audiences, resulting in a platinum album and four subsequent gold-selling follow-ups. However, LaBelle's last album with the label, 2000's solemnly-produced When a Woman Loves failed to generate a hit record or even go gold. In 2003, MCA Records was absorbed by Geffen Records. As a result, LaBelle signed with The Island Def Jam Music Group's Def Soul Classics division, joining The Isley Brothers as the two first acts on Antonio "L.A." Reid's new Def Jam imprint. LaBelle went to work on her new album in 2003, and by 2004 LaBelle and Def Jam released Timeless Journey.

== Promotion ==
Fueled by the release of LaBelle's first hit single in seven years, "New Day", the album eventually did well on the pop and R&B charts, reaching number 18 on the former and number 5 on the latter. However, LaBelle and Def Jam fell into problems immediately after its release. Shortly after releasing 2005's Classic Moments, LaBelle told reporters that she was "unceremoniously" kicked out of the label by Reid. After a public spat, Reid renegotiated a new contract with LaBelle in 2007, releasing a Christmas album. Though the album did not go gold, it did receive some popularity. Five years later, the ballad "2 Steps Away", written by Philadelphia songwriter and friend Jon DeLise, was featured on Dancing with the Stars. "2 Steps Away" featured the Philadelphia Studio Strings, arranged and conducted by Louis Anthony deLise. The song aired multiple times on "So you think you can dance" among other network shows and was re-released on the Care for Haiti compilation with notable artists, such as Wyclef Jean and Natasha Bedingfield. The success of the song eventually helped it reach Billboard's Digital Singles chart, her first charted single on that chart. "New Day" topped the Billboard Hot Dance Songs chart in 2004.

== Critical reception ==
Professional ratings
Review scores
Source	Rating
AllMusic	3/5 stars
Entertainment Weekly	B+
People	2.5/4 stars
USA Today	3.5/4 stars

AllMusic felt that "there could be no truer title for her umpteenth album; Timeless Journey mines epochs of soul music and mixes them together, letting LaBelle's unique, wavering-yet-commanding voice carry each song. LaBelle has always personified the ultimate empowered woman, in charge of her world and herself, a spirit suffused through her music. Timeless Journey positively exudes this attitude, opening with the anthemic "More Than Material." [...] Although [she] earned her legendary status a long time ago, [the album] finds her far from retiring. Steve Jones from USA Today found that LaBelle "shines with songs that match the emotional depth of her vocals. It's nice to see a veteran of her stature doing what she does best instead of compromising to compete with younger singers who are not in her league, anyway. When you're timeless, you never go out of style."

Entertainment Weekly's Kristina Feliciano noted that the album was a "makeover" for LaBelle but "her guests maintain a respectful distance, discreetly deepening the grooviness dormant in [her] since "Lady Marmalade." Timeless Journey glimmers with acid-jazz and neo-soul rhythms, and LaBelle is given sassy lyrics worthy of her diva self." People found that "while the R&B godmother does collaborate with hip-hop duo Floetry and samples Nelly Furtado's "Turn Off the Light", she mostly displays the same old attitude she has had since the mid-'80s. The result is sophisticated but unspectacular soul that won't soon make you forget "Lady Marmalade." Of course, with her vocal heroics, LaBelle can rescue even the most mundane material. Undiminished by the years, her peerless instrument remains a force of nature."

== Track listing ==
Timeless Journey track listing
No.	Title	Writer(s)	Producer(s)	Length
1.	"More Than Material"	James Moss; Patti LaBelle	PAJAM	3:54
2.	"It's Time"	Dinky Bingham; Jimi Kendrixx; LaBelle; Connie McKendrick; Shawn Smith	Bingham; Kendrixx; Smith	3:07
3.	"New Day"	LaBelle; Pierre Medor; Dwayne Nesmith; Tiffany Palmer; Carlos Ricketts; Jason Rome	Rome; The Corner Boys	3:19
4.	"Something More"	Gordon Chambers; Ezekiel Lewis; Troy Taylor	Chambers; Taylor	3:12
5.	"Sometimes Love"	Babyface	Babyface	3:48
6.	"Hear My Cry" (featuring Floetry)	Marsha Ambrosius; Darren Henson; LaBelle; Omari Dlamini; Keith Pelzer; Natalie Stewart	Henson; Pelzer	4:29
7.	"Good Lovin'"	Tanesha Blacks Jackson; Myia Davis; Shanell Irving; Trey Neverson; Taylor	Taylor	3:34
8.	"Mm Mm Mm"	Mary Brown; Sheldon Goode; LaBelle; Sami McKinney; Francci Richard	McKinney; Goode	3:48
9.	"Not Right But Real"	Goode; LaBelle; McKinney; Omari Dlamini	Babyface; McKinney; Goode	4:55
10.	"2 Steps Away"	David Ivory; Jonathan DeLise; LaBelle; Omari Dlamini	Ivory; Delise	4:30
11.	"Finally Got the Nerve" (featuring Miri Ben-Ari)	Bunny Sigler; Matt McCarrin; Ben-Ari; LaBelle	Sigler; McCarrin	3:57
12.	"Unpredictable"	Bingham; Nelly Furtado; Kendrixx; LaBelle; McKendrick; McKinney; Smith	Bingham; Kendrixx; Smith	3:04
13.	"When You Smile" (featuring Carlos Santana, Sheila E., Andy Vargas & La India)	LaBelle; McKinney; K.C. Porter; Andrew Snook; Omari Dlamini	Porter; McKinney	4:34
Total length:				50:11

== Charts ==
=== Weekly charts ===
Weekly chart performance for Timeless Journey
Chart (2004)	Peak position
US Billboard 200	18
US Top R&B/Hip-Hop Albums (Billboard)	5

=== Year-end charts ===
Year-end chart performance for Timeless Journey
Chart (2004)	Position
US Top R&B/Hip-Hop Albums (Billboard)	79
