= Native (band) =

Native is a French R&B duo composed of two sisters, Laura Mayne (born 20 January 1968 in Villemomble, Seine-Saint-Denis) and Chris Mayne (born 12 January 1970 in Villemomble). They began their singing career as backup singers with Niagara and Gérald De Palmas. They achieved their first success in 1994 with their single "Si la vie demande ça", a top ten hit in France.

In 1994, they won a Victoires de la musique award for most promising group of the year. They featured on the track "Who the F*** Is This" on the Bubba Sparxxx & The Muddkatz album New South: The Album B4 the Album Mixtape (2003).

After the group split, in 2002 Laura Mayne released her first solo album under the name Native, entitled Laura Mayne-Kerbrat.

In 2003, Chris Mayne formed the band West Isle with Éric Daniel, former member of Sweetness group. They released the album Ailleurs in 2006.

== Discography ==
=== Albums ===
- 1993: Native
- 1995: Nat(l)ive
- 1997: Couleurs de l'amour - #27 in France
- 2000: Native the best (best of)

=== Singles ===
- 1993: "Si la vie demande ça" - #9 in France
- 1994: "Tu planes sur moi" - #19 in France
- 1995: "Sometimes It Snows in April" - #49 in France
- 1995: "L'air du vent" (soundtrack of Pocahontas) - #9 in France
- 1997: "Dans ce monde à part..." - #41 in France
- 1998: "Couleurs de l'amour" - #42 in France
