= Sam Korkis =

American television producer

Sam Korkis is a television producer. His credits include 'American Chopper', 'Jesse James Outlaw Garage', and 'Street Outlaws' for Discovery, 'The Bachelor' for ABC, 'Couples Therapy' for VH1, Temptation Island for FOX, High School Reunion for The WB, KEPT for VH1, Ultimate Blackjack Tour for CBS, Wrestling Society X for MTV, and numerous other series and pilots. He is also credited as Executive Producer for The Quest a feature film for Universal Pictures.
