= Take 5 (band) =

American boy band

- Also known as: Take 5
- Origin: Orlando, Florida, United States
- Genres: Pop
- Years active: 1997–2001
- Labels: Edel Music, Elektra Records
- Past members: Ryan Goodell; Tilky Jones; Stevie Sculthorpe; Tim "TJ" Christofore; Jeff "Clay" Goodell

Take 5 was an American boy band from Orlando, Florida consisting of brothers Ryan and Jeff "Clay" Goodell, Tilky Jones, Stevie Sculthorpe, and Tim "TJ" Christofore. The band formed in 1997 and broke up in 2001.

Take 5 was one of the many groups whose formulation and promotion were due to the machinations of promoter Lou Pearlman, and all of the members had prior experience in the entertainment industries.

== Members ==
- Ryan Goodell

Full Name: Ryan Christopher Goodell
Birthdate: June 29, 1980
Hometown: Minneapolis, Minnesota

- Tilky Jones

Full Name: Tilky Montgomery Jones
Birthdate: June 24, 1981
Hometown: Charleston, South Carolina

- Stevie Sculthorpe

Full Name: Stephen James Sculthorpe
Birthdate: January 11, 1983
Hometown: Miami, Florida

- Tim "TJ" Christofore

Full Name: Timothy Joseph Christofore
Birthdate: February 29, 1984
Hometown: Minneapolis, Minnesota

- Jeff "Clay" Goodell

Full Name: Jeffrey Clayton Goodell
Birthdate: April 28, 1984
Hometown: Minneapolis, Minnesota

== Career ==
TJ Christofore had won Star Search in 1995 and played the role of Gavroche in Les Misérables on Broadway. Stevie Schulthorpe was previously a model, commercial actor, and theater performer. Brothers Ryan and Clay Goodell were both trained pianists and had experience in commercials and theater. Tilky Jones had played drums in a ska punk group called User Friendly.

Throughout 1998 and 1999, Take 5 released singles in Europe and Asia and toured in both regions. Their debut full-length album was released in mid-2000 on Elektra. While the album charted in the United States, peaking at #26 Billboard Heatseekers, the group failed to match the success of Pearlman's other outfits such as Backstreet Boys and 'N Sync in the States. Because of contractual issues with Pearlman that could not be resolved, they were forced to disband.

Christofore, as well as members of Pearlman's other bands, later alleged that Pearlman had made unwanted sexual advances toward band members.

== Aftermath ==
After the breakup, each band member either continued performing or went back to school.

Christofore went home to Minnesota and formed the band Fatt Kamp, formerly known as Jonis. Currently he performs in several local bands based in Orlando, Florida including Hyper, Prestige, and Dance Express. Most recently, he has been the lead singer in The Boomers

Sculthorpe and Jones formed a duo named Stevie dot Tilky. Later on, Sculthorpe went solo billed as SJ Rose, while Jones pursued acting and appeared on episodes of Pretty Little Liars, One Tree Hill, Single Ladies and the films Never Back Down and The Guardian.

The Goodell brothers both went back to school. Ryan graduated in 2005 from UCLA and, in May 2009 from Loyola Law School in Los Angeles, with an emphasis on entertainment law. He is married to actress Nikki DeLoach. Jeff graduated in May 2007 from USC, with a bachelor's degree in film and television production and theater arts. He worked in the Art Department on TV shows such as Big Brother 8, Big Brother: All-Stars, and Spike TV's Video Game Awards. More recently he filmed on the set of the 2009 Grammy Awards.

Talks about possible reunion of the band emerged in 2009. On MySpace and Facebook, Sculthorpe and Christofore had messages confirming the reunion, and that they had studio sessions in the first week of February 2009. A photograph of all five of them together also appeared.

== Discography ==
=== Albums ===
- Take 5 (Edel Music, 1998)
- 1. "I Give"
- 2. "The Tide Is High"
- 3. "Baby I Can't Let Go"
- 4. "Girl Of My Dreams"
- 5. "Jump Up"
- 6. "All I Wanna Know"
- 7. "Sunrise Goodbye"
- 8. "Please Stay"
- 9. "Get Down Tonight"
- 10. "Never Had It So Good"
- 11. "Easy To Love"
- 12. "Deeper Love"

- Against All Odds (Elektra Records, 2000)
- 1. "Shake It Off"
- 2. "Hottie"
  - Originally recorded by *NSYNC
- 3. "Bounce"
- 4. "Girl Next Door"
- 5. "Save the Best for Last"
- 6. "Perfect Sense"
- 7. "Missing an Angel"
- 8. "To Make You Love Me"
- 9. "Water"
- 10. "Can I Come Over"
- 11. "Never in My Life"
- 12. "Do That"
- 13. "Girl Next Door" [Ballad Version]
- 14. "Never Far Away"

=== Singles ===
- "I Give" (1998)
- "The Tide is High" (1998)
- "Shake It Off" (2000)

=== Compilation appearances ===
- "King of the Lollapat" with Innosense and Billy Crawford on Christmas That Almost Wasn't (2001)
- "Let's Get This Party Started" on Longshot Soundtrack (Trans Continental, 2002)
