= So Together =

Studio album by Innosense
- Released: August 8, 2000
- Recorded: 1999–2000 at Metalworks Studios in Mississauga, Ontario
- Genre: Pop, R&B
- Length: 45:31
- Label: RCA
- Producer: Charlie Pennachio, Jive, The Shadowmen, Wolf, Andreas Romdhane, Josef Larossi, Royal Garden, Guy Roche, Derek Brin, Shawn Desman, Khris Kellow, Full Force, BAG & Arnthor, Veit Renn

Singles from So Together
- 1. "Say No More" Released: June 27, 2000; 2. "Rain Rain" Released: 2002

Professional ratings
Review scores
Source	Rating
AllMusic	2.5/5 stars

So Together is the only studio album by American group Innosense. The album cover features cartoon versions of the group on a swing.

== Track listing ==
On the official version:

1. "Ride" – 3:14 (Jive, Charlie Pennachio, Steve Wolf)
2. "Say No More" – 3:07 (Andreas Romdhane, Josef Larossi)
3. "Beep Beep" – 4:15 (Liz Winstanley)
4. "So Together" – 3:58 (Guy Roche, Shelly Peiken)
5. "This Is It" – 3:11 (Romdhane, Larossi)
6. "Rain Rain" – 3:58 (Roche, Peiken)
7. "You Didn't Have to Hurt Me" – 4:04 (Diane Warren)
8. "www.fan-ta-see" – 3:26 (Denise Rich, Jive, Gregory Allen Bieck)
9. "A Hundred Oceans" – 4:08 (Warren)
10. "A Real Good Man" – 4:12 (Full Force, David Porter)
11. "You Can't Touch Me Now" – 3:46 (Steven R Diamond, Arnthor Birgisson, Anders Bagge)
12. "I Wish" – 4:12 (Ian Green, Nina Meryl Ossoff, Stephanie Salzman)

== Personnel ==
- Rob Bailey, Andreas "QUIZ" Romdhane, Esbjorn Ohrwall, Ingo Schroeder, John Goux, Tony Battaglia: Guitars
- Derek Brin, Guy Roche, Jive Jones, Wolf: Keyboards and Programming
- Sven Kaiser: Electric Piano
- Dushyant Bhakta: Scratching
