= Jamali (band) =

South African female musical group

- Origin: South Africa
- Genres: Pop, R&B, dance
- Years active: 2003–2019
- Labels: EMI South Africa, Independent via RespectMusic
- Past members: Jacqui Carpede; Liesl Penniken; Mariechan Luiters
- Website: jamali.co.za/home/

Jamali was a South African female musical group. The group's name is from the first two letters of each of the members' names. The members are Jacqui Carpede, Mariechan Luiters and Liesl Penniken. The band was formed on the TV show Coca-Cola Popstars. Jamali was the runner-up to the boy band Ghetto Lingo.

== Career ==
=== Formation and debut (2004–2005) ===
Emerging, like their male counterpart, Ghetto Lingo, out of the 2004 Coca-Cola Popstars talent search contest, Liesl Penniken, Mariechan Luiters, and Jacqui Carpede made their debut on South Africa's airwaves with their first radio single "Greatest Love". This was the lead single off Jamali's self-titled album, which was recorded at CSR Studios in Johannesburg. The album was certified gold for sales in excess of 25,000. The album produced the hit singles "Greatest Love", "Love Me for Me" and "Dalile".

"We wanted this to be a global album that is also proudly South African," said Mariechan. "For instance, when we worked with D-Rex we said to him that we wanted the music to be instantly recognizable as South African and his experience as a kwaito producer enabled us to really make that happen."

=== Yours Fatally (2006–2007) ===
"Yours Fatally" was the first single from Jamali's second album of the same name, which was recorded at CSR Studios in Johannesburg. For this album they co-wrote seven songs. The group were nominated for a SAMA award, but did not win.

=== 3rd Base ===
Jamali's third album featured production from D-Rex as well as George Vardas, who co-produced the group's self-titled 2004 debut and its 2006 follow-up, Yours Fatally. A few songs were released as singles and circulated chart shows around South African radio. The first single was "Knowing Me Knowing You". The second single, "A Little Obsessed", did very well, and was followed by "Maybe" and "Love at First Sight". Promotional songs were released but were not marketed, including "Skud Julle Lywe" and "A Girl Like Me" as a lead single for their greatest hits album. The album finally gave Jamali an honor by receiving a SAMA for best English pop album in 2009.

=== Toxic Candy ===
Toxic Candy is Jamali's fourth studio album, and was released in 2011. Jamali wrote 11 out of 14 songs. The track "Mzansi" was released for the 2010 Soccer World Cup, Incurable peaked in the top 20 on Highveld Top 40, and "Cant Get Enough" was number 1 on the Western Cape radio stations. Many promotional singles were released, including "Jati" (ft Pro and JR), "Free", "I Wanna Kiss You" and "Heaven".

Before the album's release, "Time Is on My side", a cover of the Rolling Stones' song, was released or leaked but never made it onto the album.

In April 2019, the band was reportedly departed to purse solo projects.

== Jamali's last performance ==
After 16 years, Jamali had their last performance at The Dome as Big Concerts, Stadium Management SA and Gearhouse SA were launching the venue

== DVDs ==
A DVD version of Jamali's album Yours Fatally was released. It included music videos for "Love Me for Me", "Yours Fatally", "Maisha", and "Secrets".

== Controversy ==
Jamali's song "Maisha" was the subject of a scandal. It was alleged that Jamali had stolen the song from popular Kenyan musician Nameless. However, Jamali released their CD/DVD of Yours Fatally and credited Nameless as one of the writers of "Maisha".
