= When a Woman Loves (Jaki Graham album) =

Studio album by Jaki Graham
- Released: July 2018
- Studio: Quest4 Studio, ICP Studios Brussels, Studio Canapé, Glass House Studios
- Genre: R&B; soul
- Label: JNT Music
- Producer: Natalie Ormsby, Le Flex, Alan Glass, Bobby Altman, Yannic Fonderie

Jaki Graham chronology
For Sentimental Reasons (2012)	When a Woman Loves (2018)

When a Woman Loves is the tenth studio album by British soul singer Jaki Graham released in July 2018 on JNT Music. The album peaked at No. 19 on the UK Hip Hop and R&B Albums Chart and No. 47 on the UK Independent Albums Chart.

== Track listing ==
No.	Title	Writer(s)	Length
1.	"Sometimes"	Markus Evans	3:52
2.	"News for You"	Afton Johnson, Eric Benet, Erik Walls, Nash, John McVicker, Jonathan Richmond	5:16
3.	"Stop the Ride"	Alan Glass, Maryanne Morgan, Tim Bretschneider	3:45
4.	"Get It Right"	Alan Glass, Brahim Atted, Yannic Fonderie	3:11
5.	"Eye to Eye"	Alan Glass, Maurice White, Sandi Strmljan	3:32
6.	"Through the Rain"	Gene Nelson, Michael McDonald	7:04
7.	"When a Woman Loves"	Le Flex	4:28
8.	"Leftover Tears"	Dennis Morgan, Michael McDonald	4:42
9.	"Someone Like You"		3:46
10.	"About Your Love"	Le Flex	3:39
11.	"Use Me"	Bill Withers	3:47
12.	"All Night Long (1985)"	Bobby Altman	3:44
13.	"Song Inside Me"	Gerry House, Michael McDonald	4:16
14.	"Ready for Love"	Alan Glass, Maryanne Morgan	3:32
