= Innosense =

American girl group

- Origin: Orlando, Florida, United States
- Genres: Pop, dance, R&B
- Years active: 1997–2003
- Labels: Sony, RCA/Jive
- Past members: Danay Ferrer; Mandy Ashford; Nikki DeLoach; Amanda Latona; Veronica Finn; Jenny Morris
- Website: innosensemusic.com

Innosense was an American girl group that were active from 1997 to 2003.

== History ==
=== 1997–1999: Formation and "Wherever You Are" ===
The band was managed by Lou Pearlman and Janet Lynn Harless (mother of Justin Timberlake). The original members were Danay Ferrer, Mandy Ashford, Nikki DeLoach, Veronica Finn, and Amanda Latona. The group was formed in 1997. Their name was suggested by Pearlman and Harless. The band decided to misspell the name so they would not sound like "innocent little four-year-olds." Their inspirations were bands such as NSYNC and the Backstreet Boys. Ashford was a member of the Attache show choir, along with high-school friend Lance Bass, with whom she also shared a vocal coach. Bass recommended Ashford to Pearlman, and she was selected to join the band. Britney Spears was initially a member of Innosense, but she departed the group to pursue a career as a solo artist before they could record any songs with her.

In 1998, Innosense released the single "Wherever You Are". A video for the song was released in Germany in 1998. Latona left the band to go solo and was replaced by Jenny Morris.

=== 2000–2003: So Together and disbandment ===
In 2000, the band released the album So Together. Its lead single "Say No More" peaked at number 20 on Billboard's Hot Singles Sales chart, but never charted on the Billboard Hot 100. The album itself never charted and was not a commercial success. In 2001, Innosense appeared in the teen movie Longshot. In 2001, Morris left the group, which left them as a quartet. The second and final single from the album, "Rain Rain", was released only in Germany in 2002; however, it failed to chart. The song would later be recorded by Cher for her 2001 album Living Proof. Their song "To Know the Unknown" was included on the soundtrack for Pokémon 3: The Movie.

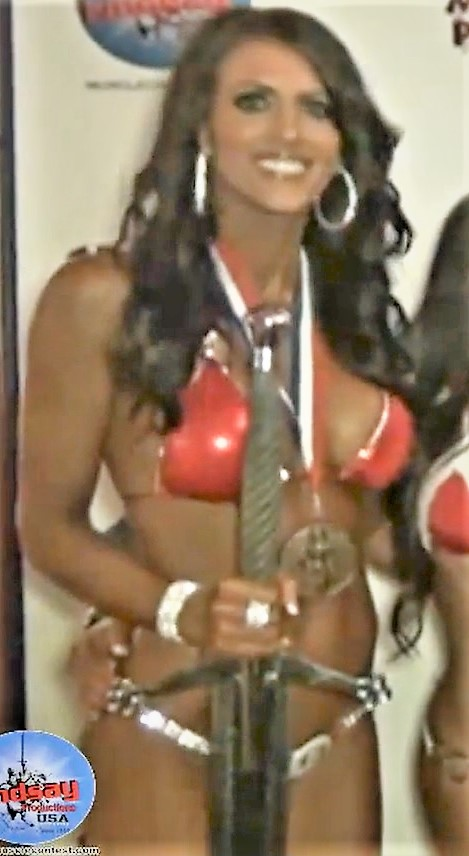
Amanda Latona after winning the IFBB Titans Grand Prix in 2011

Innosense disbanded in 2003 to work on separate projects. Ashford has since modeled in several publications, including Playboy magazine, and also served as a spokesmodel. DeLoach, an actress before Innosense, returned to acting with regular roles in such TV series as North Shore, Windfall, and most notably, as the mother of the lead character in MTV's Awkward.

Amanda Latona signed a solo contract with J Records and recorded "Can't Take It Back" (2002) and "Do You Still" (2003). Neither single charted and she was later dropped from the label. Latona dated Backstreet Boy AJ McLean. She was featured in 2002 in "Who's That Girl?", an article in The New York Times Magazine. The article chronicles J Records' grooming of Latona's career in an attempt to ensure her success. Latona became a professional bodybuilder, entering her first contest in 2003.

== Members ==
- Danay Ferrer (1997–2003)
- Mandy Ashford (1997–2003)
- Nikki DeLoach (1997–2003)
- Amanda Latona (1997–1999)
- Veronica Finn (1997–2003)
- Jenny Morris (1999–2001)

== Discography ==
=== Albums ===
- So Together (2000)

=== Singles ===
- "Wherever You Are" (1998)
- "Say No More" (2000)
- "Rain Rain" (2002)

=== Other contributions ===
- "This Must Be Love" on Millionaire Dogs (1999)
- "Don't Cha" on Cool Traxx! 2 (2001)
- "Wishing On Every Star" (Michael Garvin; Robin Wyley) on Longshot soundtrack (2001)
- "To Know the Unknown" on Pokémon 3: The Movie Soundtrack (2001)
- "King of the Lollapat" with Take 5 and Billy Crawford on Christmas That Almost Wasn't (2001)
