= When a Woman Loves (Patti LaBelle album) =

Studio album by Patti LaBelle
- Released: October 24, 2000
- Length: 53:33
- Label: MCA
- Producer: Hex Hector; Randy Jackson; Jimmy Jam & Terry Lewis; Khris Kellow; Patti LaBelle; Mac Quayle; James "Big Jim" Wright

Patti LaBelle chronology
Live! One Night Only (1998)	When a Woman Loves (2000)	Timeless Journey (2004)

When a Woman Loves is the fourteenth studio album released by American singer Patti LaBelle. Her sixth ever on the MCA Records label, it was released on October 24, 2000, in the United States.

== Background ==
By 2000, Patti LaBelle had achieved solo success with at least one platinum album and four gold albums. Four of the certified successes were with MCA Records, a company she had been an artist with since 1985. With the guidance of the label and with her husband, Armstead Edwards, LaBelle had finally achieved the solo success that had mostly eluded her since leaving the flashy pop group, Labelle, in 1976. It had been three years since her last album, the gold-certified Flame, which yielded the modestly popular hit, "When You Talk About Love".

After winning a second Grammy Award for her live album, Live! One Night Only, LaBelle laid low. The marriage of LaBelle and Edwards seemed to be solid but in early 2000, the couple made news by announcing a trial separation after 31 years of marriage. The news shocked fans of the singer, who had told the media that the couple's relationship was built on their opposite differences. Following news of the separation, LaBelle returned to the recording studio to work on her next studio album for MCA Records. Noting the modest success they had with LaBelle's original 1989 version of "If You Asked Me To", LaBelle and the song's writer, Diane Warren agreed to work together on LaBelle's new album.

== Recording ==
When A Woman Loves featured production from not only Warren and friend Denise Rich, who co-wrote several tracks, but also longtime producers Jimmy Jam and Terry Lewis, producers of LaBelle's last two hits, "The Right Kinda Lover" and "When You Talk About Love". Upon its release, when critics heard the new tracks, they thought that LaBelle's impending divorce from her husband Edwards was the cause of the sound from the tracks and from the singer's voice, though LaBelle would later deny such stories. Because Edwards had also served as LaBelle's manager for nearly 30 years, Edwards also left his position as manager leaving that position to the couple's son Zuri.

== Critical reception ==
Professional ratings
Review scores
Source	Rating
AllMusic	2.5/5 stars
Entertainment Weekly	B−
Vibe	4/5 stars

In his review for Vibe, Dimitri Ehrlich wrote: "Listening to it is like eating 12 slices of gooey chocolate butter cake—one can only digest so much lost trust, dashed hope, and soaring recovery in 45 minutes. Warren specializes in hooks and schmaltz, delivering a killer dose of both here. But Patti LaBelle, who could sing VCR manual instructions and make you cry, doesn't need songs that bang you over the dome with clues about when you're supposed to feel sad [...] The vaunted power of this lioness is still mighty to behold." People magazine remarked that LaBelle and Warren produce some "inspired moments despite the latter's occasional maudlin streak. R&B vet LaBelle is an evocative, emotionally charged singer with a flair for drama [...] At her best, as on this album's "Too Many Tears" and "Time Will," Warren's songs pulse with an empowering, you-go-girl drive. The result here is equal parts Oprah and slumber party, a woman-to-woman catalog of love's ups and downs delivered by an artist who lends dignity and soul to everything and everyone she takes on."

AllMusic editor Ed Hogan found that When a Woman Loves "displays much of the appealing warmth that has endeared her to millions of fans. It also marks another tribute to the most successful songwriter of the '90s, Diane Warren [...] Jimmy Jam and Terry Lewis produced the bulk of this mostly mellow album that is sprinkled with Labelle's intimately voiced listener-aimed spoken interludes. Highlights are the Khris Kellow-produced "If I Was a River," "Why Do Hurt Each Other," and "Tell Where It Hurts"." Entertainment Weekly critic Craig Seymour felt that "bluesy belter Patti LaBelle should've been able to add some soul-searing fire to the soggy tunes of hit songwriter Diane Warren, who penned most of the ballad-heavy album When a Woman Loves. But LaBelle mostly drowns in Warren's sap. Only when she picks up the tempo on retro-disco twirlers like Time Will does LaBelle infuse the hackneyed lyrics with new attitude."

== Commercial performance ==
Upon its October 2000 release, When a Woman Loves failed to make an impact on the Billboard 200 or the R&B albums chart, peaking at number 63 on the former chart before dropping out of the charts after only ten weeks. The record became LaBelle's first album since This Christmas (1990), to not be RIAA-certified. The sole single from When a Woman Loves, "Call Me Gone", likewise failed to chart on the Hot 100, and was given poor radio promotion. Though the title track did receive some airplay, and LaBelle performed the song occasionally during the record's promotion, it was never released officially as a single.

== Track listing ==
All tracks written by Diane Warren.

When a Woman Loves track listing
No.	Title	Producer(s)	Length
1.	"The Kitchen"	Damascene Pierre Paul; Patti LaBelle	0:57
2.	"When a Woman Loves"	Jimmy Jam and Terry Lewis; James "Big Jim" Wright^{[a]}	4:47
3.	"Make Tonight Beautiful"	Jam; Lewis; Wright^{[a]}	4:42
4.	"If I Was a River"	Khris Kellow	4:27
5.	"Why Do We Hurt Each Other"	Jam; Lewis; Wright^{[a]}	5:59
6.	"Too Many Tears, Too Many Times"	Jam; Lewis; Wright^{[a]}	5:30
7.	"Call Me Gone"	Jam; Lewis; Wright^{[a]}	4:46
8.	"Time Will"	Hex Hector; Mac Quayle	5:47
9.	"Tell Me Where It Hurts"	Kellow	4:01
10.	"I'll Still Love You More"	Jam; Lewis; Wright^{[a]}	4:41
11.	"Love Will Lead You Back"	Kellow; Randy Jackson	5:03
12.	"When a Woman Loves (Reprise)"	Jam; Lewis; Wright^{[a]}	2:53
Total length:			53:33

Notes

- ^{^[a]} signifies a co-producer

== Charts ==
Chart performance for When a Woman Loves
Chart (2000)	Peak position
US Billboard 200	63
US Top R&B/Hip-Hop Albums (Billboard)	26
