= C-Note (group) =

American boy band

C Note
- Also known as: Creating Nothing Other Than Excellence, Cnote
- Origin: Orlando, Florida, U.S.
- Genre: Pop
- Instrument: Vocal
- Years active: 1997–2008, 2023-2024
- Labels: Epic, Trans-Con Latino, Madacy, JKH Entertainment
- Past members: Andrew "Dru" Rogers; David "D'Lo" Perez; Jose "Brody" Martinez; Raul Molina; Josh Correa; Orlando Torres; Vincent Pesante

C-Note (also stylized as Cnote) was a Latin pop boy band from Orlando, Florida. The group started with the members Andrew Rogers, Jose Martinez, Raul Molina and David Perez. Then the group became a quintet with the addition of Josh Correa, Orlando Torres and Vincent Pesante after the departure of Rogers and Martinez. The initial lineup scored success in 1999 with their debut album, Different Kind of Love.

C-Note returned in 2023 with a new official website and the help of manager Stacy Larson. In 2024, they released a new single entitled "Still".

== History ==
The group formed in 1997 in Orlando for the purposes of performing in a talent show. Three of the group's members had been in a previous vocal harmony group, but the five-member group lost two members, and a fourth was recruited, completing the group's later lineup. Their performance in the competition gained attention from those affiliated with Backstreet Boys and NSYNC, and soon after, a record deal ensued. Incorporating Latin elements into their dance-pop sound, the group toured America in 1998 and released their debut album, Different Kind of Love, via Sony the following year. Different Kind of Love spawned a radio hit, "Wait Til I Get Home", which peaked at #33 on Billboard's Top 40 Mainstream chart in 1999. It also peaked at number 42 in Australia.

Different Kind of Love peaked at #163 on the Billboard 200.

In 2023, with the help of a new manager, Stacy Larson, the four original members reunited and played four shows and released three new singles.

== Past members ==
- Andrew "Dru" Rogers (1997–2001, 2023–2024)
- David "D'Lo" Perez (1997–2008, 2023–2024)
- Jose "Brody" Martinez (1997–2008, 2023–2024)
- Raul Molina (1997–2008, 2023–2024)
- Josh Correa (2005–2008)
- Orlando Torres (2005–2008)
- Vincent Pesante (2005–2008)

== Discography ==
=== Studio albums ===
- Different Kind of Love (1999)
- Cnote (2007)
- Chivalry (2008)

=== Extended plays ===
- Wepa (2005)
- Forgive Me (2007)

=== Singles ===
- "Wait Til I Get Home" (1999)
- "Spanish Fly" (1999)
- "Shine" (2001)
- "Forgive Me" (acoustic version) (2008)
- "Chivalry" (2023)
- "Still" (2024)

== Tours ==
- Britney Spears' Teen Hit Machine's Summer Tour (1999)
