= How Am I Supposed to Live Without You =

1982 song written by Doug James and Michael Bolton

Single by Laura Branigan

from the album Branigan 2
- B-side: "Mama"
- Released: July 1, 1983
- Genre: Pop
- Length: 4:29
- Label: Atlantic
- Songwriters: Michael Bolton; Doug James
- Producer: Jack White

Laura Branigan singles chronology
"Solitaire" (1983)	"How Am I Supposed to Live Without You" (1983)	"Self Control" (1984)

Audio
- "How Am I Supposed to Live Without You" on YouTube

"How Am I Supposed to Live Without You" is a song co-written in 1982 by Doug James and Michael Bolton. The track was originally recorded by Laura Branigan in 1983, charting at number one in both the US and Canadian Adult Contemporary charts. Bolton later recorded his own version of the song that topped the US Billboard Hot 100 and became a worldwide hit.

"How Am I Supposed to Live Without You" was supposed to be recorded by Australian duo Air Supply, but when Arista President Clive Davis asked for permission to change the lyrics of the chorus, Bolton refused, and Davis let go of the song. Subsequently Laura Branigan recorded it as written, and it became the first major hit for the two songwriters. Bolton's own rendition became a worldwide hit in early 1990.

== Laura Branigan version ==
As the second single from Branigan's second album Branigan 2, "How Am I Supposed to Live Without You" spent three weeks at number one on the US Billboard Adult Contemporary chart and peaked at number twelve on the Hot 100 in early October 1983. Branigan's single also hit the number one spot on the Adult Contemporary chart in Canada. This success came without benefit of a music video. Branigan performed the song on the syndicated music countdown show Solid Gold in late 1983 and on the popular holiday special Dick Clark's New Year's Rockin' Eve. Branigan 2 went out of print in 2004, but Branigan's original version can still be heard on the compilation albums The Best of Branigan (1995), The Essentials (2002) and The Platinum Collection (2006).

The single's B-side was a newly written song over the music to the Italian song "Mama", by Giancarlo Bigazzi and Umberto Tozzi. Branigan's first major hit had been with "Gloria", another English song written to an Italian hit by the duo.

=== Track listings ===
7-inch single
No.	Title	Length
1.	"How Am I Supposed to Live Without You"	4:29
2.	"Mama"	3:56

7-inch single – Promo
No.	Title	Length
1.	"How Am I Supposed to Live Without You" (Short version)	3:57
2.	"How Am I Supposed to Live Without You"	4:29

7-inch single (Canada)
No.	Title	Length
1.	"How Am I Supposed to Live Without You"	4:29
2.	"Don't Show Your Love"	3:30

=== Personnel ===
- Laura Branigan – vocals
- Robbie Buchanan – arrangements, synthesizers, keyboards
- Carlos Vega – drums
- Doane Perry – drums
- Michael Landau – guitars
- Dennis Belfield – bass
- Michael Boddicker – synthesizers
- Lenny Castro – percussion
- Jon Joyce – background vocals
- Jim Haas – background vocals
- Joe Pizzulo – background vocals

=== Charts ===
==== Weekly charts ====
Weekly chart performance for "How Am I Supposed to Live Without You"
Chart (1983)	Peak position
Australia (Kent Music Report)	46
Canada Adult Contemporary (RPM)	1
Israel (Israeli Singles Chart)	32
US Billboard Hot 100	12
US Adult Contemporary (Billboard)	1
US Cash Box Top 100	13

==== Year-end charts ====
Year-end chart performance for "How Am I Supposed to Live Without You"
Chart (1983)	Position
US Billboard Hot 100	61
US Adult Contemporary (Billboard)	10
US Cash Box Top 100	87

== 1986 lawsuit ==
Laura Branigan demoed songwriter Gary William Friedman's "Promise Me I'll Feel This Way Tomorrow", several years before she recorded "How Am I Supposed to Live Without You". Branigan did not meet the songwriters Michael Bolton and Doug James before the recording. In 1986, songwriter Friedman filed lawsuit against Branigan, the songwriters, and other parties involved in the recording, alleging that "How Am I Supposed to Live Without You" copied his song "Promise Me I'll Feel This Way Tomorrow". In her testimony of the August 5, 1986, trial, Branigan performed Bolton and James's song and two other songs recorded by various artists, "Will You Love Me Tomorrow" (recorded by Branigan for her 1984 album Self Control) and "MacArthur Park". Toward the end of August 1986, juries of a New York federal court cleared the case defendants from the charges.

== Michael Bolton version ==
"How Am I Supposed to Live Without You"
- US retail cassette single; the US CD format was promo-only

Single by Michael Bolton

from the album Soul Provider
- B-side: "Forever Eyes"
- Released: October 1989
- Genre: Soft rock
- Length: 4:48 (album version); 4:15 (radio edit)
- Label: Columbia; CBS
- Songwriters: Michael Bolton; Doug James
- Producer: Michael Omartian

Michael Bolton singles chronology
"Soul Provider" (1989)	"How Am I Supposed to Live Without You" (1989)	"How Can We Be Lovers" (1990)

Music video
- "How Am I Supposed to Live Without You" on YouTube

Michael Bolton recorded a version of the song for his sixth studio album, Soul Provider (1989). The single reached number one on both the US Billboard Hot 100 and Adult Contemporary charts and also won Bolton a Grammy Award for Best Male Pop Vocal Performance. The release marked a turning point in Bolton's career. After years of being primarily known as a songwriter, the single got him recognition as a performer and made him a certified superstar.

=== Chart performance ===
The single debuted on the Billboard Hot 100 in October 1989. It slowly climbed the chart and by mid-January became the first new number one single of the 1990s.

=== Music video ===
Philip Rose and Greg Gold directed the song's music video. The beginning of the video shows Bolton performing the selection whilst he is sitting in his living room, and small bits of story about his and his girlfriend's relationship are told through fade-outs. As he is about to leave the apartment, already having packed his suitcases, he thinks of her and the time they spent together and seemingly decides against the decision; he then cuddles with his girlfriend. It is revealed, the next night, that he plans to give her a bracelet, which he quickly hides as he reads a newspaper before she enters the room. She surprises him with breakfast and they cuddle again. Later on, the two have a fight about something and she storms out of the apartment, and Bolton visibly feels guilty.

=== Track listings ===
7-inch single
No.	Title	Length
1.	"How Am I Supposed to Live Without You" (Edit)	4:14
2.	"Forever Eyes"	4:23

CD single
No.	Title	Length
1.	"How Am I Supposed to Live Without You"	4:18
2.	"Forever Eyes"	4:23
3.	"(Sittin' On) The Dock of the Bay" (7-inch version)	4:56
4.	"That's What Love Is All About" (Live)	4:23

=== Personnel ===
- Michael Bolton – lead vocals
- Michael Omartian – keyboards
- Michael Landau – guitars and solo
- Neil Stubenhaus – bass
- John Keane – drums

=== Charts ===
==== Weekly charts ====
Weekly chart performance for "How Am I Supposed to Live Without You"
Chart (1989–1990)	Peak position
Australia (ARIA)	2
Austria (Ö3 Austria Top 40)	17
Belgium (Ultratop 50 Flanders)	1
Canada Top Singles (RPM)	8
Canada Adult Contemporary (RPM)	1
Europe (Eurochart Hot 100 Singles)	5
Ireland (IRMA)	2
Italy Airplay (Music & Media)	10
Luxembourg (Radio Luxembourg)	3
Netherlands (Dutch Top 40)	3
Netherlands (Single Top 100)	3
New Zealand (Recorded Music NZ)	10
Sweden (Sverigetopplistan)	9
UK Singles (Official Charts)	3
US Billboard Hot 100	1
US Adult Contemporary (Billboard)	1
US Cash Box Top 100	2
West Germany (GfK)	15

==== Year-end charts ====
Year-end chart performance for "How Am I Supposed to Live Without You"
Chart (1990)	Position
Australia (ARIA)	7
Belgium (Ultratop 50 Flanders)	15
Canada Top Singles (RPM)	76
Canada Adult Contemporary (RPM)	17
Europe (Eurochart Hot 100 Singles)	48
Germany (Media Control)	91
Netherlands (Dutch Top 40)	30
Netherlands (Single Top 100)	24
Sweden (Topplistan)	40
UK Singles (Gallup)	28
US Billboard Hot 100	12
US Adult Contemporary (Billboard)	4
US Cash Box Top 100	37

=== Certifications ===
Certifications for "How Am I Supposed to Live Without You"
Region	Certification	Certified units/sales
Australia (ARIA)	Platinum	70,000^{^}
United Kingdom (BPI)	Silver	200,000^{‡}
^{^} Shipments figures based on certification alone.^{‡} Sales+streaming figures based on certification alone.

=== Release history ===
Release dates and formats for "How Am I Supposed to Live Without You"
Region	Date	Format(s)	Label(s)	Ref.
United States	October 1989	7-inch vinyl; cassette	Columbia	
United Kingdom	February 5, 1990	7-inch vinyl; 12-inch vinyl; limited-edition CD	CBS	
United Kingdom	February 19, 1990	CD	CBS	

== See also ==
- List of Billboard Adult Contemporary number ones of 1983 and 1990 (U.S.)
- List of Billboard Hot 100 number-one singles of 1990
