= Cameras in the Sky =

Studio album by Sam Phillips
- Released: February 12, 2011
- Studio: Littlebox Studio
- Genre: Pop, rock
- Length: 20:00
- Label: Littlebox Recordings
- Producer: Sam Phillips

Sam Phillips chronology
Don't Do Anything (2008)	Cameras in the Sky (2011)	Push Any Button (2013)

Cameras in the Sky is an album by American singer and songwriter Sam Phillips. It is the sixth release from her digital subscription program The Long Play.

== Reception ==
In her review of "When I'm a Camera" for The Globe and Mail, Robert Everett-Green characterized it as a pop and cabaret track, which incorporates "Christopher Isherwood's self-as-camera conceit in this haunting, haunted tune about seeing things you might want to keep well away from your heart".

== Track listing ==
All songs written by Sam Phillips.

1. "Tell Me"
2. "Broken Circle"
3. "Happy Mediums"
4. "Leap Towards the Earth"
5. "Throw Yourself Away"
6. "Little White Feet"
7. "Hide Space"
8. "Cameras in the Sky"
9. "When I'm a Camera"
10. "So Glad You're Here"

== Personnel ==
- Sam Phillips – vocals, guitar, drums, piano
- Eric Gorfain – viola, violin, guitar, piano, drums, keyboards
- Greg Leisz – electric guitar
- Chris Bruce – electric guitar
- Jennifer Condos – bass
- Jay Bellerose – drums, percussion
- The Section Quartet – string section
  - Eric Gorfain – violin, viola
  - Daphne Chen – violin
  - Lauren Chipman – viola
  - Richard Dodd – cello
