= The Best of Branigan =

Greatest hits album by Laura Branigan
- Released: June 6, 1995
- Recorded: 1982–1995
- Genre: Pop, rock
- Label: Atlantic

Laura Branigan chronology
Over My Heart (1993)	The Best of Branigan (1995)	The Essentials (2002)

Singles from The Best of Branigan
- 1. "Dim All the Lights" Released: 1995

Professional ratings
Review scores
Source	Rating
AllMusic	4/5 stars
Entertainment Weekly	A
Knoxville News Sentinel	4/5 stars
Q	4/5 stars
Spin	(favorable)

The Best of Branigan is a greatest hits compilation by singer Laura Branigan released in the United States in 1995, and re-released in 2007. The anthology also marked the end of Branigan's relationship with Atlantic Records. Of the thirteen tracks, eight had charted, including her major hit singles "Gloria", "Solitaire", "Self Control", "Power of Love", and "How Am I Supposed to Live Without You".

The album features two new recordings: covers of Maria McKee's "Show Me Heaven" and Donna Summer's "Dim All the Lights", the latter of which was released as a single in late spring 1995 and became a Billboard Top 40 Dance hit. Remaining tracks were taken from her 1993 album Over My Heart, which had been largely overlooked by audiences.

In terms of her global music releases, Best of Branigan had already been preceded by other greatest hits anthologies outside the United States, all with very similar titles, beginning in 1988, and again in 1992, for listeners in much of the rest of the world.

Prior to its April 2007 re-release on Rhino Records, the compilation had sold 147,000 copies in the U.S.

== Critical reception ==
The compilation album was well received by many music critics. Chuck Eddy from Entertainment Weekly gave it an A, writing, "Laura Branigan’s voice was as titanic as any ’80s pop star’s. There was animal in her howl and opera in her high notes. Her biggest hits, collected on The Best of Branigan, told about women heading for mental breakdowns. "Spanish Eddie", a disco-flamenco about a night when a friend’s death leads to insanity, wasn’t a hit; it should’ve been."

Cashbox noted that "there might be a tendency to think of Branigan as a second-rate Sheena Easton...but a look at the track listing on this best of, which includes two new covers — one of Maria McKee’s “Show Me Heaven” and one of Donna Summer’s “Dim All the Lights” — indicates that might not be a fair assessment. On the other hand, this is the woman who recorded “Gloria,” the closing track here, and covered a Michael Bolton tune, so who really cares about being fair. Fans of Branigan, and they obviously exist, will find pleasure in this, and Adult Contemporary may jump on her cover of “Show Me Heaven.”

Allmusic awarded the album four stars, noting that "Branigan's powerhouse voice and career are fairly represented here. Beyond the joy of hearing some of the hits - "Solitaire," "The Lucky One," and "Spanish Eddie" - you can hear how her underutilized voice can help bring songs to life. She is remarkably understated on the subtly over-the-top "Over You," while her dramatic appeal is used to its fullest on "How Can I Help You Say Goodbye" and "Ti Amo." Though her career never had the type of trajectory Celine Dion did, her voice is just as strong and just as full. With cuts like the playful "Is There Anybody Here but Me?," a faithful remake of Donna Summer's "Dim All the Lights," and the pop ballad "Show Me Heaven," you can hear how her voice matured in fullness and timbre and how maturity brought her music and her talent to a new level in the latter portion of her career."

In their review of "Dim All the Lights", Billboard wrote that Branigan "boldly takes on Donna Summer's disco evergreen with festive results. The combination of Branigan's signature melodrama and the song's sweeping romance is notably strong - not to mention loads of fun."

== Track listing ==
No.	Title	Writer(s)	Length
1.	"Solitaire"	Martine Clemenceau, Diane Warren	4:07
2.	"Show Me Heaven"	Jay Rifkin, Eric Rackin, Maria McKee	4:11
3.	"Ti Amo"	Umberto Tozzi, Giancarlo Bigazzi, Warren	4:16
4.	"Spanish Eddie"	Dave Palmer, Chuck Cochran	4:15
5.	"Power of Love"	Candy DeRouge, Gunther Mende, Jennifer Rush, Mary Susan Applegate	5:22
6.	"Is There Anybody Here But Me"	Kevin Wells, Andre Pessis	4:52
7.	"Dim All the Lights"	Donna Summer	4:44
8.	"How Am I Supposed to Live Without You"	Michael Bolton, Doug James	4:30
9.	"Over You"	Laura Branigan, Billy Branigan	5:21
10.	"The Lucky One"	Bruce Roberts	4:10
11.	"How Can I Help You Say Goodbye"	Karen Taylor-Good, Burton Collins	4:30
12.	"Self Control"	Bigazzi, Raffaele Riefoli, Steve Piccolo	4:07
13.	"Gloria"	Tozzi, Bigazzi, Trevor Veitch	4:49
