= Main Man =

Single by Cher

from the album Cher
- B-side: "Hard Enough Getting Over You"
- Released: October 1988
- Recorded: 1986–1987
- Studio: Bearsville Studios (Woodstock, NY); The Hit Factory (New York, NY)
- Genre: Pop rock
- Length: 3:51
- Label: Geffen
- Songwriter: Desmond Child
- Producer: Desmond Child

Cher singles chronology
"Skin Deep" (1988)	"Main Man" (1988)	"After All" (1989)

Music video
- "Main Man" on YouTube

"Main Man" is a rock song by American singer-actress Cher from her eighteenth studio album, Cher. It was written and produced by Desmond Child. It was released as a single from the album in 1988 by Geffen.

It had originally been recorded by Desmond Child & Rouge in 1978.

== Song information ==
"Main Man" was released as a promo CD in the United States and as a commercial 7" inch single. In 1988 in order to promote the song, a music video was filmed and Cher sang "Main Man" during the MTV Video Music Awards.

== Critical reception ==
Jose F. Promis of Allmusic retrospectively highlighted the song and called it "wonderfully sweet ballad."

== Music video ==
Cher in the music video for "Main Man".

A music video was made in which Cher roams around her then empty mansion which at the time she was selling to comedian Eddie Murphy. The video also featured clips of Cher while singing the song at the MTV music awards. Rob Camiletti, Cher's boyfriend at the time, also appears in the video.

== Track listing ==
- US 7" and cassette single
1. "Main Man" – 3:48
2. "(It's Been) Hard Enough Getting Over You" – 3:48
