= Don't Do Anything =

Studio album by Sam Phillips
- Released: June 3, 2008
- Studio: Electro Magnetic Studio, Littlebox Studio, Sunset Sound Studios
- Genre: Pop, rock
- Length: 35:12
- Label: Nonesuch
- Producer: Sam Phillips

Sam Phillips chronology
A Boot and a Shoe (2004)	Don't Do Anything (2008)	Push Any Button (2013)

Professional ratings
Review scores
Source	Rating
AllMusic	4/5 stars
The Boston Globe	(favorable)
Paste	(favorable)
PopMatters	8/10 stars
Trouser Press	(favorable)

Don't Do Anything is the eleventh studio album by American singer and songwriter Sam Phillips. The album is Phillips' first to be self-produced and was released on June 3, 2008.

On September 15, 2008 a live webcast of NPR's In Concert series from The Ram's Head in Annapolis, MD showcased the album.

"Sister Rosetta Goes Before Us" was recorded by Robert Plant and Alison Krauss for their 2007 album Raising Sand. Phillips stated the song was inspired by Sister Rosetta Tharpe.

== Track listing ==
All tracks are written by Sam Phillips.

No.	Title	Length
1.	"No Explanations"	3:08
2.	"Can't Come Down"	1:58
3.	"Another Song"	2:14
4.	"Don't Do Anything"	3:28
5.	"Little Plastic Life"	2:16
6.	"My Career in Chemistry"	2:20
7.	"Flowers Up"	2:28
8.	"Sister Rosetta Goes Before Us"	2:44
9.	"Shake It Down"	3:52
10.	"Under the Night"	3:06
11.	"Signal"	4:36
12.	"Watching Out of This World"	3:03

== Personnel ==
- Sam Phillips – vocals, guitar, piano
- Patrick Warren – pump organ
- Paul Bryan – bass guitar
- Jennifer Condos – bass guitar
- Jay Bellerose – drums
- The Section Quartet
  - Eric Gorfain – Stroh violin, banjo, guitar, mandolin, piano
  - Daphne Chen – violin
  - Leah Katz – viola
  - Richard Dodd – cello
