= Mickey Curry =

American drummer (born 1956)

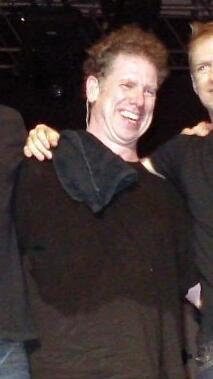
- Curry with Bryan Adams in 2006

Background information
- Born: Michael Timothy Curry; June 10, 1956 (age 70)
- Origin: New Haven, Connecticut, U.S.
- Genre: Rock
- Occupation: Musician
- Instrument: Drums
- Years active: 1973–present

Michael Timothy Curry (born June 10, 1956) is an American drummer. He has collaborated with singer-songwriter Bryan Adams since the early 1980s, but has also worked with Hall & Oates, Cher, Tina Turner, Alice Cooper, David Bowie, Elvis Costello, Sam Phillips, Tom Waits, Survivor, The Cult and Steve Jones. He currently plays with Blue Öyster Cult founding member Joe Bouchard.

== Early life ==
Mickey Curry was born in New Haven, Connecticut. He started playing drums at age 11 under the tutelage of Nick Forte. When he was 13, he and two of his brothers formed a band called The Rack. At age 17, he joined the Scratch Band in Connecticut.

== Early career ==
He played in local bands until around 1980, when he started working in New York studios. While working in Manhattan, he joined the band Tom Dickie and the Desires, managed by Tommy Mottola, manager of Hall & Oates. Impressed by Curry's work, Mottola asked him to record with Hall & Oates on their album Private Eyes. He subsequently toured with Hall & Oates until 1986.

== Bryan Adams ==
During the period he was playing with Hall & Oates, Curry met producer Bob Clearmountain, who had recently begun working with a young Bryan Adams, and appeared on Adams' second album, You Want It You Got It, and later on nearly all of Adams' subsequent albums. Following his stint with Hall & Oates, Curry began touring full time with Adams.

== Other bands ==
Curry has played for a variety of artists, touring with several of them. In 1987, he was the drummer on Jude Cole's eponymous debut album. In 1988, he served as session drummer for Survivor's album, Too Hot to Sleep. That same year, he joined hard rock band The Cult, performing on their album Sonic Temple, which featured one of the band's most successful and well-known songs, "Fire Woman". In 1989, Curry played drums on the Ian Hunter/Mick Ronson Album YUI Orta, and in 1991, Mickey Curry joined with The Cult again for another album Ceremony.

== Collaborations ==
- You Want It You Got It – Bryan Adams (A&M Records, 1981)
- Private Eyes – Hall & Oates (RCA Records, 1981)
- H_{2}O – Hall & Oates (RCA Records, 1982)
- Cuts Like a Knife – Bryan Adams (A&M Records, 1983)
- Big Bam Boom – Hall & Oates (RCA Records, 1984)
- Reckless – Bryan Adams (A&M Records, 1984)
- Downtown – Marshall Crenshaw (Warner Bros. Records, 1985)
- Spoiled Girl – Carly Simon (Epic Records, 1985)
- Rain Dogs – Tom Waits (Island Records, 1985)
- Rockbird – Debbie Harry (Chrysalis Records, 1986)
- Daring Adventures – Richard Thompson (Polydor Records, 1986)
- Back in the High Life – Steve Winwood (Island Records, 1986)
- Break Every Rule – Tina Turner (Capitol Records, 1986)
- King of America – Elvis Costello (F-Beat Records, 1986)
- Into the Fire – Bryan Adams (A&M Records, 1987)
- I'm Only Fooling Myself – Eric Martin (Capitol Records, 1987)
- Jude Cole – Jude Cole (Warner Bros. Records, 1987)
- The Turning – Sam Phillips (Myrrh Records, 1987)
- Coming Around Again – Carly Simon (Arista Records, 1987)
- The Indescribable Wow – Sam Phillips (Virgin Records, 1988)
- Back to Avalon – Kenny Loggins (CBS Records, 1988)
- Amnesia – Richard Thompson (Capitol Records, 1988)
- Pat McLaughlin – Pat McLaughlin (Capitol Records, 1988)
- Too Hot to Sleep - Survivor (Scotti Bros. Records, 1988)
- Yo Frankie – Dion DiMucci (Arista Records, 1989)
- Groove Approved – Paul Carrack (Chrysalis Records, 1989)
- Mystery Girl – Roy Orbison (Virgin Records, 1989)
- Sonic Temple - The Cult (Beggars Banquet/Sire Records, 1989)
- Cruel Inventions – Sam Phillips (Virgin Records, 1991)
- Love Hurts – Cher (Geffen, 1991)
- Waking Up the Neighbours – Bryan Adams (A&M Records, 1991)
- Rumor and Sigh – Richard Thompson (Capitol Records, 1991)
- Places I Have Never Been – Willie Nile (Columbia Records, 1991)
- Hey Stoopid - Alice Cooper (Epic Records, 1991)
- Ceremony - The Cult (Beggars Banquet/Sire Records, 1991)
- Life Is Messy – Rodney Crowell (Columbia Records, 1992)
- Mitch Malloy – Mitch Malloy (RCA Records, 1992)
- Martinis & Bikinis – Sam Phillips (Virgin Records, 1994)
- Dart to the Heart – Bruce Cockburn (Columbia Records, 1994)
- Bad Habits – Colin James (WEA Records, 1995)
- 18 til I Die – Bryan Adams (A&M Records, 1996)
- The Peacemaker – Jerry Lynn Williams (Viceroy, 1996)
- Falling into You – Céline Dion (Epic Records, 1996)
- Olé – Tonio K. (Gadfly Records, 1997)
- On a Day Like Today – Bryan Adams (A&M Records, 1998)
- Lara Fabian – Lara Fabian (Epic Records, 1999)
- Do It for Love – Hall & Oates (Sanctuary Records, 2003)
- Room Service – Bryan Adams (Polydor Records, 2004)
- 11 – Bryan Adams (Polydor Records, 2008)
- Laughing Down Crying – Daryl Hall (Verve Records, 2011)
- Tracks of My Years – Bryan Adams (Verve Records, 2014)
- Shine a Light – Bryan Adams (Polydor Records, 2019)
- Fire It Up – Steve Cropper (Provogue Records, 2021)

== Musical style and preferences ==
- Mickey Curry exclusively uses Yamaha Drums and has endorsed the brand for many years.
- Curry's influences include Ringo Starr, John Bonham, Jeff Porcaro, Steve Gadd, Marvin Gaye and Jim Gordon.
