= Branigan 2 =

1983 studio album by Laura Branigan

Studio album by Laura Branigan
- Released: March 1983
- Recorded: 1982
- Studios: Rusk Sound (Hollywood, California); Allen Zentz (Hollywood, California)
- Length: 37:15
- Label: Atlantic
- Producer: Jack White

Laura Branigan chronology
Branigan (1982)	Branigan 2 (1983)	Self Control (1984)

Singles from Branigan 2
- 1. "Solitaire" Released: March 1983; 2. "How Am I Supposed to Live Without You" Released: June 1983; 3. "Deep in the Dark" Released: 1983

Professional ratings
Review scores
Source	Rating
AllMusic	3/5 stars

Branigan 2 is the second studio album by American singer Laura Branigan, released in March 1983 by Atlantic Records. The album reached number 29 on the US Billboard 200 and was certified Gold by the Recording Industry Association of America (RIAA) on September 18, 1985, denoting shipments in excess of 500,000 copies in the United States.

Three singles were released from the album. The lead single, "Solitaire", is a cover version of a 1981 French-language song of the same name by French singer Martine Clémenceau, with English lyrics written by Diane Warren. The single was a commercial success, peaking at number seven on the US Billboard Hot 100. The second single, "How Am I Supposed to Live Without You", was co-written by Michael Bolton. It reached number 12 on the Billboard Hot 100 and topped the Adult Contemporary chart for three weeks.

Branigan 2 also includes a cover of the Who's "Squeeze Box" (1975), as well as "Deep in the Dark", a newly written song to the music of Falco's "Der Kommissar" (1981). "Deep in the Dark" was released in the United Kingdom as the album's third and final single.

The song "Find Me" was used as the love theme of the 1983 Robert Hays film Touched.

== Reception ==
In their review of the album, Billboard commended the album, stating that "Branigan follows the top 40 album Branigan with this set of riveting, pulsating rhythm ballads in the vein of her smash hit "Gloria." The most intriguing cuts on the album is a remake of, of all things, the Who's 1975 hit "Squeeze Box." Branigan shows her vocal power on the new hit "Solitaire," and on two other songs that were first hits in Europe and later translated into English: "Deep In The Dark" (where Branigan mixes talking and singing) and "Mama." The album's title may be disengenious, but the music reflects continued growth by a promising new star."

Cashbox noted that "1982 saw newcomer Laura Branigan capture the #1 spot on the Cash Box Pop Singles chart with a neo-disco tune called “Gloria,” and this year she’s back with another LP boasting a hot single, “Solitaire”. The sultry chanteuse also scores points here with an insightful version of The Who’s “Squeeze Box” and still another In the “Der Kommissar” series of covers, as Branigan takes Falco’s original hit and spices it up with sexy, paranoid lyrics about things moving “Deep In The Dark."

AllMusic praised the album, noting that "Laura Branigan's full, expressive voice shows serious growth on this, her second album. A much more cohesive collection than her first disc, the material on Branigan 2 utilizes her vocals to their fullest extent; and while there were many filler songs on her debut, this album doesn't waste a single track...though this album isn't the most mature album of its time, it shows she's more comfortable with herself and her voice and shows enormous promise of what she's really capable."

== Track listing ==
Side one
No.	Title	Lyrics	Music	Length
1.	"Solitaire"	Diane Warren^{[a]}	Martine Clémenceau	4:07
2.	"Deep in the Dark"	Bill Bowersock^{[a]}	Falco; Robert Ponger	3:50
3.	"Close Enough"	John Lang	Robbie Buchanan	3:41
4.	"Lucky"	Steve Bi	Bi	3:58
5.	"Squeeze Box"	Pete Townshend	Townshend	3:00

Side two
No.	Title	Lyrics	Music	Length
6.	"How Am I Supposed to Live Without You"	Michael Bolton; Doug James	Bolton; James	4:29
7.	"I'm Not the Only One"	Warren; The Doctor	Warren; The Doctor	3:22
8.	"Mama"	Warren^{[a]}	Giancarlo Bigazzi; Umberto Tozzi	3:56
9.	"Find Me"	Carol Connors	David Shire	3:22
10.	"Don't Show Your Love"	Connors	Lee Holdridge	3:30
Total length:				37:15

=== Notes ===
- ^{^[a]} signifies English lyrics only

== Personnel ==
Credits adapted from the liner notes of Branigan 2.

=== Musicians ===
- Laura Branigan – all vocals
- Robbie Buchanan – arrangements, synthesizers, keyboards
- Carlos Vega – drums
- Doane Perry – drums
- Michael Landau – guitars
- Marty Walsh – additional guitar on "Deep in the Dark"
- Dennis Belfield – bass
- Michael Boddicker – synthesizers
- Lenny Castro – percussion
- Jon Joyce – background vocals
- Jim Haas – background vocals
- Joe Pizzulo – background vocals
- Eddie Hawkins – additional background vocals on "Deep in the Dark" and "Lucky"
- Joe Esposito – additional background vocals on "Deep in the Dark"
- Gene Morford – additional background vocals on "Squeeze Box"

=== Technical ===
- Jürgen Koppers – engineering, mixing (Note: Mixed at Rusk Sound Studios (Hollywood, California) and Allen Zentz Recording Studios (Hollywood, California))
- John Kovorek – engineering assistance
- Jon Van Nest – engineering assistance
- David Shire – rhythm track production on "Find Me"
- Carol Connors – rhythm track production on "Find Me"
- Brian Gardner – mastering (Note: Mastered at Allen Zentz Mastering (Hollywood, California))
- Robbie Buchanan – associate production
- Jack White – production

=== Artwork ===
- Barry Levine – photography
- Bob Defrin – art direction

== Charts ==
Chart performance for Branigan 2
Chart (1983)	Peak position
Australian Albums (Kent Music Report)	30
Canada Top Albums/CDs (RPM)	46
New Zealand Albums (RMNZ)	11
US Billboard 200	29
US Cash Box Top 200 Albums	30

== Certifications ==
Certifications for Branigan 2
Region	Certification	Certified units/sales
United States (RIAA)	Gold	500,000^{^}
^{^} Shipments figures based on certification alone.
