= The Essentials (Laura Branigan album) =

Greatest hits album by Laura Branigan
- Released: August 20, 2002
- Recorded: 1982–1990
- Genre: Pop, rock
- Label: Atlantic
- Producer: Jack White, Harold Faltermeyer, Stock/Aitken/Waterman, David Kershenbaum, Richard Perry, Peter Wolf, Robbie Buchanan, Greg Mathieson

Laura Branigan chronology
The Best of Branigan (1995)	The Essentials (2002)	The Platinum Collection (2006)

Professional ratings
Review scores
Source	Rating
Allmusic	3.5/5 stars

The Essentials was released in 2002 and was the second greatest-hits collection of singer Laura Branigan that was issued in the United States. Many fans consider this to be superior to the previous compilation, The Best of Branigan, due to the inclusion of singles "Shattered Glass," "Moonlight on Water," "Never in a Million Years" and her introduction of the rock ballad "I Found Someone", all of which were missing from the previous release. The album is her last to be released during her lifetime.

== Track listing ==
No.	Title	Writer(s)	Length
1.	"Gloria"	Bigazzi, Tozzi, Veitch	4:50
2.	"Solitaire"	Clemenceau, Warren	4:07
3.	"Self Control"	Bigazzi, Piccolo, Riefoli	4:08
4.	"The Lucky One"	Roberts	4:10
5.	"How Am I Supposed to Live Without You"	Bolton, James	4:29
6.	"Spanish Eddie"	Palmer, Cochran	4:10
7.	"I Found Someone"	Bolton, Mangold	4:01
8.	"Shattered Glass"	Coe, Mitchell	3:41
9.	"Power of Love"	Applegate, DeRouge, Mende, Rush	5:26
10.	"Never in a Million Years"	Farrell, Robbins, Stephenson	4:08
11.	"Ti Amo"	Bigazzi, Tozzi, Warren	4:18
12.	"Moonlight on Water"	Goldmark, Kipner	4:39
