= Recollection (Leslie Phillips album) =

Compilation album by Leslie Phillips
- Released: 1987
- Recorded: 1982–1987
- Genre: CCM, Christian rock, Christian pop, alternative folk
- Label: Myrrh/Word Records
- Producer: T Bone Burnett, Jack Joseph Puig, Dan Posthuma

Leslie Phillips chronology
| The Turning (1987) | Recollection (1987) | The Indescribable Wow (1988) |

Recollection is a compilation album by Leslie Phillips, released in 1987 on Myrrh Records.

Largely a collection of greatest hits from the Myrrh years, this album also contains two new tracks including an acoustic version of "Your Kindness" and the never-before release, "No One But You." Also included are the original demo versions of "Walls of Silence" and "You're the Same." The track "You're The Same" on the digital version of Black and White in a Grey World (1985) has replaced the original recording with the home demo version. The album debuted and peaked at number 40 on the Billboard Top Inspirational Albums chart.

== Track listing ==
All songs written by Sam Phillips, except where noted.

1. "Your Kindness" (acoustic recording) – 3:12
2. "No One But You" (new recording) – 2:36
3. "Heart of Hearts" (Mark Heard) – 3:16
4. "Walls Of Silence" (home demo) – 2:50
5. "Libera Me" (Burnett) – 3:12
6. "Love Is Not Lost" – 4:02
7. "Answers Don't Come Easy" – 4:09
8. "You're The Same" (home demo) – 3:23
9. "I'm Finding" – 3:25
10. "When The World Is New" – 3:39
11. "By My Spirit" – 4:43
12. "Strength of My Life" – 5:35
13. "Your Kindness (Reprise)" (acoustic recording) – 1:16

== Production notes ==
- Produced by T Bone Burnett, Jack Joseph Puig and Dan Posthuma.

== Charts ==
| Chart (1988) | Peak position |
|---|---|
| US Top Inspirational Albums (Billboard) | 40 |

=== Radio singles ===
| Year | Singles | Peak positions | |
| Year | Singles | CCM AC | CCM CHR |
|---|---|---|---|
| 1988 | "No One But You" | 28 | 11 |
