= Over My Heart =

Studio album by Laura Branigan
- Released: August 17, 1993
- Recorded: 1992–1993
- Genres: Pop rock; adult contemporary
- Length: 55:20
- Label: Atlantic
- Producers: Laura Branigan; Billy Branigan; Jorge Casas; Clay Ostwald; Phil Ramone

Laura Branigan chronology
The Very Best of Laura Branigan (1992)	Over My Heart (1993)	The Best of Branigan (1995)

Singles from Over My Heart
- 1. "Didn't We Almost Win It All" Released: 1993; 2. "It's Been Hard Enough Getting Over You" Released: 1993; 3. "How Can I Help You to Say Goodbye" Released: 1994

Professional ratings
Review scores
Source	Rating
AllMusic	2/5 stars
Entertainment Weekly	(favorable)

Over My Heart is the seventh and final studio album by American singer Laura Branigan. Released in August 1993, it was Branigan's most personal album and saw her again try her hand at producing, alongside successful producer Phil Ramone. While the Gloria Estefan-penned "Love Your Girl" was aimed for the clubs that made her famous, the album was ballad-heavy, including the opener "How Can I Help You To Say Goodbye"; the Spanish-language "Mujer Contra Mujer"; "Mangwane (The Wedding Song)" (taught to her by her friend Stevie Godson, who was also the executive producer on the track), sung in Sotho, a South African language, and recorded there with the Mmabana Children's Choir; and several of her own compositions, "Didn't We Almost Win It All" and "Over You".

== Critical reception ==
Billboard Magazine praised the album in their review, writing "acclaimed singer applies her graceful alto to a collection of first-rate originals plus songs written for her by the likes of Gloria Estefan, Michael Bolton, and Roxette's Per Gessle. Title track single is geared for AC play with potential pop crossover. The same is true of the touching opener "How Can I Help You Say Goodbye," Gessle's "The Sweet Hello, The Sad Goodbye," and Branigan's own "Didn't We Almost Win It All."

Chuck Eddy from Entertainment Weekly wrote, "Branigan's 1982 hit, 'Gloria', took disco to operatic extremes, and her '84 'Self Control' was basically Joy Division's Goth-punk classic, 'She's Lost Control', made more lurid. Nowadays, Branigan is beating Celine Dion at Dion's own game, dancing between a loudly sung boom and a lonely housewife gloom. On Over My Heart, she climbs out on a new limb, belting out lyrics in Spanish and a South African dialect. But she's still rending hearts, especially when she remembers the day her family moved away from her best friend in a '59 station wagon."

Allmusic noted that "at the age of 36, Laura Branigan felt it was time to sing more about heartache and the pains of failing relationships than to give her music the same kind of pop amiability found on past hits like "Self Control" and "Gloria." But the real problem with Over My Heart is that each and every track gets doused with an overabundance of thirty-something insipidness and routine-sounding lyrical drivel...The one thing that Branigan does have going for her is her voice, which sounds fresh and crisp despite her clichéd material."

== "Didn't We Almost Win It All" ==
"Didn't We Almost Win It All" was released as a promotional follow up track in some markets. In the US, it was given a promotional release as a third single for Adult Contemporary radio, though never commercially available to purchase as a standalone true "single".

Larry Flick from Billboard described the song as "a sweeping power-ballad" from Branigan's "delicious (but sadly underrated) Over My Heart album." He added, "Branigan's distinct, crystal-clear voice is warmly familiar, running through a gamut of theatrical emotions as only she can. The arrangement is packed with grandiose piano rushes, nimble guitar riffs, and pounds of faux-strings. Like sinfully tasty candy for the brain."

== Track listing ==
No.	Title	Writer(s)	Length
1.	"How Can I Help You to Say Goodbye"	Karen Taylor-Good, Burton Collins	4:29
2.	"The Sweet Hello, The Sad Goodbye"	Per Gessle	5:07
3.	"Over My Heart"	Eric Martin, André Pessis	4:24
4.	"It's Been Hard Enough Getting Over You"	Michael Bolton, Doug James	3:41
5.	"Is There Anybody Here But Me"	Kevin Wells, André Pessis	4:51
6.	"Love Your Girl"	Gloria Estefan, Jorge Casas, Clay Ostwald	4:34
7.	"Didn't We Almost Win It All"	Laura Branigan, Brian Bec Var	5:09
8.	"Only Time Will Tell"	Kevin Wells, André Pessis	4:25
9.	"I'll Wait for You"	Laura Branigan, Kevin Wells	4:40
10.	"Mujer Contra Mujer"	José Maria Cano	5:07
11.	"Over You"	Laura Branigan, Billy Branigan	5:20
12.	"Mangwane (The Wedding Song)"	Traditional	4:02

== Personnel ==
- Laura Branigan – vocals, background vocals
- Beatrice Akuoko, Dela Amuzu, Gloria Ayee, Manuela Ayee, John:Carol Bukenya, Ann Davis, Rena Davis, Slaveca Gavrilovic, Khumo Khaole, Malebogo Felicity Mabille, Bruce Molema, Mpho Pharasi, Mokgoberg Refilwe Phirwa, Thenjiwe Roda, Refilwe Roselinda Moiloa, Golda Schultz, Barbara Sentongo, Sphumele Sibeko, Khanyisa Thakula – children's chorus
- Jacob Bantsejang, Gladys Kgadiete, Bushy Monakwane, Grace Msumbu, Patricia Tong, Ingrid Tubo – vocals
- John Benjamin Bukrnya, Christina Luboyera, Neo Carol Matte, Valentine Kgothatso Motlhabi – choir
- Billy Branigan, Jill Dell'Abate, Rory Dodd, Joy Francis, Karen Kamon, Curtis King, Charles Mangold – backing vocals
- Tony Beard, Kevin Wells – drums
- Brian Bec Var, Jeff Jacobs, Clay Ostwald, Eric Rehl, Peter "Ski" Schwartz, Dave "Squiggy" Biglan – keyboards
- Billy Branigan, Jorge Casas, Bushy Monakwane – bass guitar
- Billy Branigan, Charlton Pettus, David Spinozza – acoustic guitar
- John McCurry – electric guitar
- Dave Greenfield, Jeff Greenfield, Steve Greenfield – alto saxophone
- Bashiri Johnson – percussion
- Lenny Pickett – tenor saxophone

== Production ==
- Producers: Laura Branigan, Billy Branigan, Jorge Casas, Clay Ostwald, Phil Ramone, Stevie Godson
- Engineers: Charles Dye, Danny Grigsby, Lolly Grodner, Richard Mitchell, Clay Ostwald
- Assistant engineer: Louis Alfred III, Jim Caruana, Sean Chambers, Tom Fritze, Alister Glyn, Andy Grassi, Ron London, Jennifer Monnar, Michael Thompson
- Mixing: Danny Grigsby, Lolly Grodner, Jay Healy, Andy Smith
- Mixing Assistant: Andy Smith
- Mastering: Greg Calbi
- Programming: Jorge Casas, Roy McDonald, Clay Ostwald
- Project coordinator: Jill Bryson
- Sampling: Roy McDonald
- Arranger: Laura Branigan, Billy Branigan, Jorge Casas, Jeff Jacobs, Clay Ostwald, Phil Ramone, Eric Rehl, Peter "Ski" Schwartz
- Computers: Roy McDonald

== Charts ==
Chart performance for Over My Heart
Chart (1993)	Peak position
Australian Albums (ARIA)	151
