= Branigan (album) =

1982 studio album by Laura Branigan

Studio album by Laura Branigan
- Released: March 8, 1982
- Recorded: 1981–1982
- Studios: Rusk Sound (Hollywood, California)
- Length: 34:08
- Label: Atlantic
- Producer: Jack White

Laura Branigan chronology
Branigan (1982)	Branigan 2 (1983)

Singles from Branigan
- 1. "All Night with Me" Released: March 1982; 2. "Gloria" Released: June 1982

Branigan is the debut studio album by American singer Laura Branigan, released on March 8, 1982, by Atlantic Records. The album's lead single, "All Night with Me", reached number 69 on the US Billboard Hot 100, while the second single, an English version of Italian singer Umberto Tozzi's song "Gloria", was a commercial success, propelling Branigan to international prominence.

The album was certified Gold in both the United States and Canada. Her Eurodisco version of "Gloria" was nominated for a Grammy Award for Best Pop Vocal Performance, Female in 1983.

A remastered and expanded edition of the album was released on July 7, 2014, by Gold Legion. Included is the 12-inch mix of "Gloria", extending the song's original length from 4:51 to 5:53 with much of this intro disengaged. Several tracks are hard to find from the album sessions, all but one of which were released as singles or B-sides prior to the release of the final album.

== Reception ==
Billboard praised the album, stating "don't be taken by Branigan's pretty yet dainty image she exudes on the cover art. This lady has a set of chops that she puts to maximum effectiveness on this collection of hot rockers and some mellower fare. Supported by studio hotshots like Steve Lukather, Lee Sklar, Michael Boddicker, Bob Glaub and others, Branigan's voice explodes with a fury, making it clear that she's in the same league as her competition."

AllMusic was more mixed in their review, commenting that "this album, despite being worth checking out simply for Branigan's powerful voice, is middling at best. Though she finds nuances in lyrics and melodies that are not up to her talent, the production often bogs the album down, especially on the ballads."

== Track listing ==
Side one
No.	Title	Writer(s)	Length
1.	"All Night with Me"	Chris Montan	3:52
2.	"Gloria"	Umberto Tozzi; Giancarlo Bigazzi; Trevor Veitch	4:50
3.	"Lovin' You Baby"	Adrian John Loveridge; John Wonderling	4:34
4.	"Living a Lie"	Dick St. Nicklaus; Sue Neal	3:41

Side two
No.	Title	Writer(s)	Length
5.	"If You Loved Me"	Diane Warren; The Doctor	3:15
6.	"Please Stay, Go Away"	Loveridge; Wonderling	3:33
7.	"I Wish We Could Be Alone"	Laura Branigan	3:18
8.	"Down Like a Rock"	Randy VanWarmer	3:34
9.	"Maybe I Love You"	Veitch; Greg Mathieson; Alan Sorrenti	3:31
Total length:			34:08

2014 expanded edition bonus tracks
No.	Title	Writer(s)	Length
10.	"Looking Out for Number One" (Midnight mix)	Jack Tempchin; Bill Bodine	5:33
11.	"Fool's Affair"	Richard Kerr; Troy Seals	3:42
12.	"Tell Him"	Bert Berns	2:38
13.	"Love Me Tonight"	Robbie Seidman	3:33
14.	"When"	Branigan	2:45
15.	"Looking Out for Number One" (single version)	Tempchin; Bodine	3:57
16.	"Gloria" (12" mix)	Tozzi; Bigazzi; Veitch	5:54
Total length:			62:10

== Personnel ==
Credits adapted from the liner notes of Branigan.

=== Musicians ===
- Laura Branigan – vocals
- Michael Landau – guitar
- Steve Lukather – guitar
- Trevor Veitch – guitar
- Greg Mathieson – keyboards, synthesizer, arrangements
- Leland Sklar – bass
- Bob Glaub – bass
- Carlos Vega – drums
- Michael Boddicker – synthesizer
- Jon Joyce – background vocals
- Joe Chemay – background vocals
- Jim Haas – background vocals
- Stephanie Spruill – background vocals
- Maxine Willard Waters – background vocals
- Julia Tillman Waters – background vocals
- Lisa Sarna – background vocals

=== Technical ===
- Jürgen Koppers – recording, mixing (Note: Mixed at Rusk Sound Studios (Hollywood, California))
- John Kovarek – recording
- Brian Gardner – mastering (Note: Mastered at Allen Zentz Mastering (Hollywood, California))
- Jack White – production
- Greg Mathieson – co-production

=== Artwork ===
- Jim Houghton – photography
- Bob Defrin – art direction

== Charts ==
=== Weekly charts ===
Weekly chart performance for Branigan
Chart (1982–1983)	Peak position
Australian Albums (Kent Music Report)	50
Canada Top Albums/CDs (RPM)	23
US Billboard 200	34
US Cash Box Top 200 Albums	43

=== Year-end charts ===
Year-end chart performance for Branigan
Chart (1983)	Position
US Billboard 200	60

== Certifications ==
Certifications for Branigan
Region	Certification	Certified units/sales
Australia (ARIA)	Gold	20,000^{^}
Canada (Music Canada)	Gold	50,000^{^}
United States (RIAA)	Gold	500,000^{^}
^{^} Shipments figures based on certification alone.
