= A Boot and a Shoe =

Studio album by Sam Phillips
- Released: April 27, 2004
- Studio: Sunset Sound Recorders, Hollywood, California; The Village, Hollywood, California; Stagg Street Studios, Van Nuys, California
- Genre: Pop, rock, folk
- Length: 35:02
- Label: Nonesuch
- Producer: T Bone Burnett

Sam Phillips chronology
Fan Dance (2001)	A Boot and a Shoe (2004)	Don't Do Anything (2008)

Professional ratings
Aggregate scores
Source	Rating
Metacritic	83/100
Review scores
Source	Rating
AllMusic	4/5 stars
Entertainment Weekly	B+
The Irish Times	3/5 stars
Los Angeles Times	3.5/4 stars
Mojo	3.5/5 stars
Paste	4/5 stars
Q	4/5 stars
Uncut	7/10

A Boot and a Shoe is the tenth studio album released by American singer and songwriter, Sam Phillips. The album was released on April 27, 2004 and produced by T Bone Burnett.

== Track listing ==
All tracks are written by Sam Phillips.

No.	Title	Length
1.	"How to Quit"	2:27
2.	"All Night"	4:05
3.	"I Dreamed I Stopped Dreaming"	1:52
4.	"Open the World"	2:19
5.	"Red Silk Five"	2:30
6.	"Reflecting Light"	3:21
7.	"Infiltration"	2:16
8.	"Draw Man"	3:38
9.	"I Wanted to Be Alone"	2:16
10.	"Love Changes Everything"	3:10
11.	"If I Could Write"	2:20
12.	"Hole in My Pocket"	1:25
13.	"One Day Late"	3:13

== Personnel ==
- Sam Phillips – vocals, guitar
- Chris Bruce – guitar
- Marc Ribot – guitar
- Patrick Warren – piano, field organ, pump organ
- T Bone Burnett – bass guitar
- Mike Elizondo – bass guitar
- David Piltch – bass guitar
- Carla Azar – drums
- Jay Bellerose – drums
- Jim Keltner – drums
- The Section Quartet
  - Eric Gorfain – violin
  - Daphne Chen – violin
  - Leah Katz – viola
  - Richard Dodd – cello
