= Cruel Inventions =

Studio album by Sam Phillips
- Released: May 28, 1991
- Studio: Eagle Audio, Fort Worth, Texas; Ocean Way, Los Angeles, California; Sunset Sound Factory, Hollywood, California; Reggie Fisher's, Los Angeles, California
- Genre: Alternative rock
- Length: 36:19
- Label: Virgin
- Producer: T Bone Burnett

Sam Phillips chronology
The Indescribable Wow (1988)	Cruel Inventions (1991)	Martinis & Bikinis (1994)

Cruel Inventions is the sixth studio album by American singer and songwriter Sam Phillips.

== Critical reception ==
Professional ratings
Review scores
Source	Rating
AllMusic	3.5/5 stars
Chicago Tribune	3.5/4 stars
Christgau's Consumer Guide	(choice cut)
The Encyclopedia of Popular Music	3/5 stars
Entertainment Weekly	A

Cruel Inventions received mostly favorable reviews from critics. At Entertainment Weekly, David Browne gave the album an A, writing that it "...is fraught with both beauty and tension, making it one of the year's most beguiling records." Browne named it his sixth favorite album of 1991.

== Track listing ==
All tracks are written by Sam Phillips.

No.	Title	Length
1.	"Lying"	3:52
2.	"Go Down"	3:38
3.	"Cruel Inventions"	3:00
4.	"Standing Still"	3:10
5.	"Tripping Over Gravity"	5:21
6.	"Now I Can't Find the Door"	3:36
7.	"Private Storm"	4:10
8.	"Raised on Promises"	3:11
9.	"Hole in Time"	3:19
10.	"Where the Colors Don't Go"	3:02

== Personnel ==
- Sam Phillips – vocals, Chamberlin, guitars
- T Bone Burnett – Chamberlin, guitars
- Van Dyke Parks – Chamberlin, string arrangements
- Jim Goodwin – acoustic piano
- Elvis Costello – guitars
- Marc Ribot – guitars
- Jerry Scheff – bass
- Alex Acuña – drums, percussion
- Michael Blair – drums, percussion
- Mickey Curry – drums, percussion
- Ralph Forbes – drums, percussion
- David Kemper – drums, percussion
- Scott Musick – drums, percussion
- Sandy Bull – oud
- The Sid Page Strings – string quartet
  - Larry Corbett – cello
  - John Acevedo – viola
  - Sid Page – violin
  - Joel Derouin – violin

== Production ==
- T Bone Burnett – producer
- Stacy Baird – recording
- Rik Pekkonen – recording
- Joe Schiff – recording
- Tchad Blake – mixing
- Kevin Killen – mixing
- Max Garcia – assistant engineer
- Mark Guilbeault – assistant engineer
- Julie Last – assistant engineer
- Tom Nellen – assistant engineer
- Chris Niswander – assistant engineer
- Eric Rudd – assistant engineer
- Brian Soucy – assistant engineer
- Jeff Ward – assistant engineer
- Bob Ludwig – mastering at Masterdisk (New York City, New York)
- Melanie Nissen – art direction
- Inge Schapp – design
- Kathleen Philpott – design
- Anton Corbijn – photography
- Borman Entertainment – management
