= Omnipop (It's Only a Flesh Wound Lambchop) =

Studio album by Sam Phillips
- Released: August 20, 1996
- Studios: Sunset Sound Recorders, Hollywood, California
- Genre: Alternative rock
- Length: 42:17
- Label: Virgin
- Producer: T Bone Burnett

Sam Phillips chronology
Martinis & Bikinis (1994)	Omnipop (It's Only a Flesh Wound Lambchop) (1996)	Zero Zero Zero (1998)

Omnipop (It's Only a Flesh Wound Lambchop) is the eighth studio album by American singer-songwriter Sam Phillips. The album's subtitle is a quote from the film The Producers.

== Reception ==
Omnipop was a critical and commercial flop, selling only about a quarter as many copies as its predecessor, Martinis & Bikinis, and receiving several negative reviews from music critics. In one such review, the Chicago Tribune's Mark Caro wrote that the album's "lyrics are more pronouncements than personal revelations, and [Phillips'] observations are less insightful than broad and ornery."

Professional ratings
Review scores
Source	Rating
AllMusic	3/5 stars
Chicago Tribune	2/4 stars
Christgau's Consumer Guide	(dud)
Entertainment Weekly	C
Los Angeles Times	2.5/4 stars
Pitchfork	6.5/10

== Track listing ==
All tracks are written by Sam Phillips except where noted.

No.	Title	Writer(s)	Length
1.	"Entertainmen"		4:15
2.	"Plastic Is Forever"		3:31
3.	"Animals on Wheels"		3:17
4.	"Zero Zero Zero!"		3:41
5.	"Help Yourself"		3:05
6.	"Your Hands"		6:58
7.	"Power World"		3:49
8.	"(Skeleton; Instrumental)"		1:42
9.	"Where Are You Taking Me"		3:34
10.	"Compulsive Gambler (Ditty)"		0:48
11.	"Faster Pussycat to the Library!"		2:30
12.	"Slapstick Heart"	Sam Phillips, Bill Berry, Peter Buck, Mike Mills, Michael Stipe	5:07

== Personnel ==
- Sam Phillips – vocals, guitar, Chamberlin
- Darrell Leonard – trumpet
- Les Lovitt – flugelhorn, trumpet
- Kenneth Kugler – trombone
- Ira Nepus – trombone
- Steve Williams – trombone
- Suzette Moriarty – French horn
- Patrick Warren – Chamberlin
- Matt Betton – marimba
- Smokey Hormel – guitar
- Greg Leisz – guitar
- Marc Ribot – guitar
- Todd Vincent – guitar
- Jon Brion – Chamberlin, piano, guitar, bass guitar, drums
- Armando Compean – bass guitar
- Brad Hauser – bass guitar
- Jerry Scheff – bass guitar
- Matt Chamberlain – drums, percussion
- Don Heffington – drums, maracas
- Jim Keltner – drums, percussion
- Josh LaBelle – drums, dumbek
- Paulinho da Costa – bongos
