= How Can I Help You Say Goodbye =

Song performed by Patty Loveless

Single by Patty Loveless

from the album Only What I Feel
- B-side: "How About You"
- Released: March 19, 1994
- Recorded: 1993
- Genre: Country
- Length: 4:59
- Label: Epic
- Songwriters: Karen Taylor-Good; Burton Banks Collins
- Producer: Emory Gordy Jr.

Patty Loveless singles chronology
"You Will" (1993)	"How Can I Help You Say Goodbye" (1994)	"I Try to Think About Elvis" (1994)

Music video
- "How Can I Help You to Say Goodbye" on YouTube

"How Can I Help You to Say Goodbye"

Single by Laura Branigan

from the album Over My Heart
- B-side: "I'll Wait for You"
- Released: 1994
- Recorded: 1993
- Genre: Pop
- Length: 4:29
- Label: Atlantic
- Songwriters: Karen Taylor-Good; Burton Banks Collins
- Producer: Phil Ramone

Laura Branigan singles chronology
"It's Been Hard Enough Getting Over You" (1993)	"How Can I Help You to Say Goodbye" (1994)	"Dim All the Lights" (1995)

"How Can I Help You Say Goodbye" is a song written by Karen Taylor-Good and Burton Banks Collins. It was first recorded by American country music singer Patty Loveless for her sixth album, Only What I Feel (1993), and released in March 1994 by Epic Records as the fourth single from the album. The song peaked at number three on the US Billboard Hot Country Singles and Tracks chart. The accompanying music video was directed by Jim Shea. A version by American singer, songwriter, and actress Laura Branigan was released later the same year on her final studio album, Over My Heart (1993), also being released as a single. The song was later included on Branigan's 1995 greatest hits album, The Best of Branigan.

The song is also recorded by Melanie Safka in some different versions. It was first released on the Double CD "Silvery Anniversary" in 1993 and on some compilation CD's in 1999.

== Content ==
In the three verses, the narrator describes with florid imagery three experiences of loss in her life: moving away from her best friend as a young girl, separating from her husband as an adult, and her mother's death. Each time, in the repeating chorus, her mother seeks to comfort her, asking "how can I help you to say goodbye?"

== Background and release ==
Loveless' album, "Only What I Feel" had sold over 650,000 copies and had been certified as an RIAA Gold Album. Sony/Epic was receiving requests from radio stations that this song be released as a single, and in March 1994 it was released. The song climbed up the charts, reaching number three in June. It was also nominated for the 1995 Grammy Awards for Best Female Country Vocal Performance and Best Country Song. The music video, directed by Jim Shea, was nominated by both the CMA and the ACM as 1995 Video of the Year. The song was also nominated for the Song of the Year at the 12th annual Music City News Country Songwriters Awards in 1994.

"How Can I Help You Say Goodbye" charted for 20 weeks on the US Billboard Hot Country Singles and Tracks chart, reaching No. 3 during the week of June 4, 1994.

"Leaving a childhood friend behind, I've gone through that. I've been through a divorce, and I've lost a parent. I've known all three experiences. I think that this song is a way of making us understand that you've got to say goodbye. It's a very hard word, but it's a part of our lives."

— Patty Loveless talking about the song.

Burton Collins, who was an actor at the time, had never written a song before "How Can I Help You Say Goodbye". He told Country Weekly that the title was spoken to him by his grandmother shortly before her death in 1988. After being introduced to Karen Taylor-Good by a mutual friend, he wrote the song with her. Collins said that he and Taylor-Good wrote the song in three hours.

Loveless told in 1993, that a letter from Collins gave her the strength to get through the song. "It hit me so hard that I just cried every time I tried to record it. I had a real difficult time just getting through it." The universal power of the song became evident the first time she performed it - for an audience of crusty media types at a convention in New York. "I saw this guy breaking up, sort of rubbing his eyes and trying to control his feelings, and I went up to him after the show and said, 'I didn't mean to make you cry'."

In 1994, she told Billboard magazine, "It's unbelievable what that song has done, and how many people it has reached out there. I'm getting standing ovations. We go into another song right after that, and my guitar player almost has to break into the applause in order to get started on the next tune." She added that the song induces "people [to] share their thoughts with me about what they've been through."

== Critical reception ==
=== Patty Loveless version ===
Larry Flick from Billboard magazine wrote, "As she's proven time and time again, Loveless has no equal when it comes to caressing a country lyric. Put her together with a killer ballad like this, and you've got something truly special. A broken heart never sounded so good." Jack Hurst from Chicago Tribune named it "exceptional material" on the album, with "a highly affecting lyric about mileposts of life". Alanna Nash from Entertainment Weekly felt the singer "reaches her artistic zenith on the soul-rattling ballads", remarking "the enormously involving" "How Can I Help You Say Goodbye".

Editors Hoelzle and Smith from the Gavin Report noted, "Patty was apparently so moved by this song that she had a hard time getting through it in the studio. Her final performance carries all that emotion." Jim Abbott from The Sentinel wrote, "By far the most emotional song on the album is 'How Can I Help You Say Goodbye', a ballad about how leaving childhood friends, divorce and death affect the relationship between a mother and her daughter."

=== Laura Branigan version ===
After Laura Branigan released her version of the song, Larry Flick from Billboard magazine wrote, "Hands down, the most memorable moment from Branigan's 1993 album, Over My Heart, finally gets a shot at radio play. Branigan has rarely packed this kind of emotional punch without raising her voice above a melancholy tone. A tear jerking exploration of death and loss deserves instant acceptance from adult contemporary programmers."

Chuck Eddy from Entertainment Weekly said, "Nowadays, Branigan is beating Celine Dion at Dion's own game", noting that "she's still rending hearts, especially when she remembers the day her family moved away from her best friend in a '59 station wagon." Fell and Rufer from the Gavin Report commented, "If there's still such a thing as a "woman's song" this would certainly qualify." They stated that Branigan "takes it to heart with a delicate production that's unique to the format and to the moment." Chuck Campbell from Knoxville News Sentinel felt it should've been a hit, declaring it as "a bit melodramatic (about a dying mother), but delivered with simple grace by Branigan."

== Track listing ==
7" single
No.	Title	Length
1.	"How Can I Help You Say Goodbye"	5:00
2.	"How About You"	2:41

== Charts ==
=== Weekly charts ===
Chart (1994)	Peak position
Canada Country Singles (RPM)	19
US Hot Country Songs (Billboard)	3

=== Year-end charts ===
Chart (1994)	Position
US Hot Country Songs (Billboard)	48
