= The Turning (album) =

Studio album by Leslie Phillips
- Released: 1987
- Studios: Sunset Sound Factory, Los Angeles; Sunset Sound, Los Angeles; Mad Hatter, Los Angeles; Mama Jo's, Hollywood; Eagle Audio, Fort Worth, Texas; Capitol Studios, Hollywood
- Genres: CCM, Christian rock, alternative folk
- Labels: Myrrh/Word Records, DCC Compact Classics
- Producer: T Bone Burnett

Leslie Phillips chronology
| Black and White in a Grey World (1985) | The Turning (1987) | Recollection (1987) |

Alternative cover
- The 1998 DCC re-release

Professional ratings
Review scores
| Source | Rating |
|---|---|
| AllMusic | 4/5 stars |

The Turning is an album by Leslie Phillips that was released by Myrrh in 1987 and re-released in 1997 under the name Sam Phillips.

This album marks the first time Phillips worked with producer T Bone Burnett. The two married soon after the release of this album, and Burnett would go on to produce more albums for the singer. The Turning stands out as a turning point in Phillips' career as a singer and songwriter; on one side, the cheerful, upbeat pop-rock albums that she recorded in the early 1980s, and, on the other, the quirky 60's music influenced rock and folk albums, with a much darker and more poetic tone lyrically.

This album was listed at No. 8 in the book CCM Presents: The 100 Greatest Albums in Christian Music.The Turning peaked at number 21 on the Billboard Top Inspirational Albums chart.

== Track listing ==
All tracks are written by Leslie Phillips except where noted.

| No. | Title | Writer(s) | Length |
|---|---|---|---|
| 1. | "River of Love" | T Bone Burnett | 2:46 |
| 2. | "Love Is Not Lost" | | 4:02 |
| 3. | "The Turning" | | 3:38 |
| 4. | "Libera Me" | T Bone Burnett, Sam Phillips | 3:12 |
| 5. | "Carry You" | | 4:23 |
| 6. | "Beating Heart" | | 2:57 |
| 7. | "Expectations" | | 3:19 |
| 8. | "Down" | | 3:29 |
| 9. | "Answers Don't Come Easy" | | 4:11 |
| 10. | "God Is Watching You" | T Bone Burnett, Sam Phillips | 3:48 |

== Personnel ==
- Leslie Phillips – vocals, harmony vocals, synthesizers, drum programming
- John Andrew Schreiner – synthesizers
- T Bone Burnett – guitars, drum programming, harmony vocals
- Jerry Scheff – bass (1, 3-10)
- David Miner – bass (2)
- Mickey Curry – drums
- Ralph Forbes – drum programming
- Alex Acuña – percussion
- Peter Case – harmony vocals
- Tonio K – harmony vocals
- Dawn O'Hanlon – harmony vocals

== Production ==
- T Bone Burnett – producer
- Tom Willet – executive producer
- Tchad Blake – recording, mixing
- Steven Ford – recording
- Larry Hirsch – recording
- Bill Jackson – recording
- Stephen Shelton – recording
- Mike Kloster – recording assistant
- David Knights – recording assistant
- Brian Gardner – original mastering at Bernie Grundman Mastering (Hollywood, California)
- Steve Hoffman – remastering (1998 release)
- Michael Hodgson – art direction, design
- Dennis Keeley – photography
- Pete Caravolais – photography assistant
- Tony Proctor Lambe – hair stylist, make-up artist

== Charts ==
| Chart (1987) | Peak position |
|---|---|
| US Top Inspirational Albums (Billboard) | 21 |

=== Radio singles ===
| Year | Singles | Peak positions | |
| Year | Singles | CCM AC | CCM CHR |
|---|---|---|---|
| 1987 | "Libera Me" | 9 | 2 |
| 1987 | "Love Is Not Lost" | — | 14 |
| 1987 | "Answers Don't Come Easy" | 27 | 11 |
