= Solitaire (Martine Clémenceau song) =

1981 song by Martine Clémenceau

Standard artwork variant

"Solitaire" is a 1981 song sung and written by Martine Clémenceau. The English version was later released in March 1983 as the lead single of American singer Laura Branigan's second studio album, Branigan 2 (1983). It was lyricized in English by Diane Warren and produced by Jack White and Robbie Buchanan.

== History ==
The song originated as a 1981 recording in French by Martine Clémenceau for whom "Solitaire" was a modest hit with a French chart peak of #50 on the French pop charts where it remained for 22 weeks. Written by Clémenceau herself, the French version of "Solitaire" concerned a recluse who shuts himself away from a world moving toward nuclear war. The English lyrics of "Solitaire" reinvent the song's narrative, with the playing of the card game solitaire employed as a metaphor for the singer enduring the neglect of her lover. "Solitaire" would launch the hitmaking career of Diane Warren, who had recently been employed as a staff writer by Branigan's producer Jack White; Warren gave White the completed lyrics for "Solitaire" the day after he asked her to give the song an English rendering.

== Laura Branigan version ==
"Solitaire"

Single by Laura Branigan

from the album Branigan 2
- B-side: "I'm Not the Only One"; "If You Loved Me"; "Squeeze Box"
- Released: March 23, 1983
- Genre: Electropop; synth-pop
- Length: 4:06
- Label: Atlantic
- Composer: Martine Clémenceau
- Lyricists: Martine Clémenceau; Diane Warren
- Producers: Jack White; Robbie Buchanan

Laura Branigan singles chronology
"Gloria" (1982)	"Solitaire" (1983)	"How Am I Supposed to Live Without You" (1983)

Music video
- "Solitaire" on YouTube

Released as the lead single from the Branigan 2 album, "Solitaire" debuted on the Billboard Hot 100 the week Branigan's breakthrough single "Gloria" fell off the chart. With a peak position of number seven, "Solitaire" became Branigan's second consecutive top-10 entry. It also reached numbers 16 and 28 on Billboard's Adult Contemporary and Dance charts, respectively. Internationally, the single charted at number eight in Canada and number 12 in New Zealand.

The verses begin low and restrained, with the melody's theme repeated in ever-higher variations throughout the pre-chorus and chorus, climaxing in three high, sustained belts of "Solitaire". The song's rangy melody and dramatic refrain appealed to Branigan and producers Jack White and Robbie Buchanan, who extended the original arrangement to revolve back to one last refrain, giving Branigan a triumphant, sustained final note in keeping with the new lyrics by Warren, which have Branigan turning the tables on a neglectful lover and getting on with a life she had put on hold for him. The note is a mere two seconds shy of the world record for longest note held by a female singer in a pop song, which is held by Donna Summer in "Dim All the Lights" (which was covered by Branigan in 1995).

=== Promotion ===
Branigan promoted the song with appearances on American Bandstand, Solid Gold and The Merv Griffin Show, among others. The song's dramatic, theatrical style and range was a vocal showcase, and it was not uncommon for talent show contestants such as those on Star Search to tackle "Solitaire". It was a favorite of a young Celine Dion, who performed the song in a rare televised clip.

"Solitaire" was promoted with an elaborately produced music video depicting the song's narrative: after her neglectful boyfriend leaves her, Branigan is shown recording at a studio and apparently occupied with the trappings of fame and career but spending her free time lonely. When her remorseful ex attempts a reconciliation, she shakes her head and walks away, pausing to flip a pack of cards toward him. He stoops down to pick them up. The rest of the video shows both of them spending time alone with flashbacks of their time together.

An Atlantic 12″ featured an extended version of the song that ran 5:16 in length; Hot Tracks, a popular DJ remix service of the time, produced their own extended remix as well, which ran to 7:02 and clocked in at 140 BPM. The song was re-released by Atlantic in the United States as an "Oldies Series" single in the mid-1980s, backed with "Gloria". In Europe, the song saw limited release as a 12″ single backed with "Gloria". In addition to Branigan 2, which went out of print in 2004, the single version of "Solitaire" appears on 1995's The Best of Branigan (re-released in 2007), 2002's The Essentials: Laura Branigan, and 2006's The Platinum Collection. Diane Warren not only added English lyrics to Martine Clemenceau's song but she cowrote the magnificent 'Silent Partners' released by Laura in 1984.

=== Track listings ===
7-inch single
No.	Title	Length
1.	"Solitaire"	4:06
2.	"I'm Not the Only One"	3:22

7-inch single (UK)
No.	Title	Length
1.	"Solitaire"	4:06
2.	"If You Loved Me"	3:15

12-inch single (UK)
No.	Title	Length
1.	"Solitaire" (Special mix)	5:16
2.	"If You Loved Me"	3:15
3.	"Squeeze Box"	3:00

=== Charts ===
==== Weekly charts ====
Chart (1983)	Peak position
Australia (Kent Music Report)	5
Bolivia (UPI)	4
Canada Top Singles (RPM)	8
Canada Adult Contemporary (RPM)	8
Israel (Israeli Singles Chart)	28
New Zealand (Recorded Music NZ)	12
US Billboard Hot 100	7
US Adult Contemporary (Billboard)	16
US Dance Club Songs (Billboard)	28
US Cash Box Top 100	8
Quebec (ADISQ)	14

==== Year-end charts ====
Chart (1983)	Position
Australia (Kent Music Report)	69
Canada Top Singles (RPM)	74
US Billboard Hot 100	59
US Cash Box Top 100	53

== Other versions ==
In 1982 "Solitaire" had been rendered in German as "Immer Mehr" and recorded by Milva; in 1983, in the wake of the Branigan version, another German rendering retaining the title "Solitaire" was recorded by Séverine using the backing track from the Branigan recording. Also in 1983, Hungarian female singer Kati Kovács recorded her rendition of the song, using the lyrics from the Branigan version, that appeared on the album Super Hits.
