= Push Any Button =

Studio album by Sam Phillips
- Released: August 13, 2013
- Studio: Littlebox Studio
- Length: 28:59
- Label: Littlebox Recordings
- Producer: Sam Phillips

Sam Phillips chronology
Cameras in the Sky (2011)	Push Any Button (2013)	World on Sticks (2018)

Professional ratings
Aggregate scores
Source	Rating
Metacritic	77/100
Review scores
Source	Rating
AllMusic	4/5 stars
Blurt	4/5 stars
PopMatters	8/10

Push Any Button is the tenth studio album by American musician Sam Phillips. It was released in August 2013 by Littlebox Recordings.

== Track listing ==
All tracks are written by Sam Phillips.

No.	Title	Length
1.	"Pretty Time Bomb"	2:35
2.	"All Over Me"	2:57
3.	"When I'm Alone"	2:40
4.	"See You in Dreams"	4:26
5.	"Going"	1:35
6.	"Things I Shouldn't Have Told You"	2:47
7.	"Speaking of Pictures"	2:32
8.	"You Know I Won't"	2:32
9.	"No Time Like Now"	3:58
10.	"Can't See Straight"	2:57

== Personnel ==
Personnel sourced from the liner notes

- Sam Phillips – guitar, vocals
- Dave Palmer – piano, keyboards
- Benmont Tench – piano
- Chris Bruce – guitar
- Sebastian Steinberg – double bass
- Jennifer Condos – bass guitar
- Jay Bellerose – drums
- The Section Quartet
  - Eric Gorfain – violin, guitar, keyboards
  - Daphne Chen – violin
  - Lauren Chapman – viola
  - Richard Dodd – cello
