= Fan Dance (album) =

Studio album by Sam Phillips
- Released: June 18, 2001
- Studio: Sunset Sound Recorders, Hollywood, California; Village Recorders, Hollywood, California; Electro Magnetic Sound, Los Angeles, California
- Genre: Pop, rock
- Length: 32:39
- Label: Nonesuch
- Producer: T Bone Burnett

Sam Phillips chronology
Zero Zero Zero (1998)	Fan Dance (2001)	A Boot and a Shoe (2004)

Professional ratings
Aggregate scores
Source	Rating
Metacritic	79/100
Review scores
Source	Rating
AllMusic	4.5/5 stars
The Austin Chronicle	3/5 stars
Robert Christgau	(dud)
PopMatters	(not rated)

Fan Dance is the ninth studio album from American singer and songwriter Sam Phillips.

== Track listing ==
All tracks are written by Sam Phillips except where noted.

No.	Title	Writer(s)	Length
1.	"The Fan Dance"		3:46
2.	"Edge of the World"		3:01
3.	"Five Colors"		3:43
4.	"Wasting My Time"		3:08
5.	"Taking Pictures"		1:58
6.	"How to Dream"		3:07
7.	"Soul Eclipse"		3:12
8.	"Incinerator"		2:03
9.	"Love Is Everywhere I Go"		2:03
10.	"Below Surface"		1:41
11.	"Is That Your Zebra?"		1:49
12.	"Say What You Mean"	Sam Phillips, T-Bone Burnett	3:38

== Personnel ==
- Sam Phillips – vocals, guitar, piano
- T Bone Burnett – piano, bass, tambourine
- Marc Ribot – guitar, banjo, quattro banjo guitar, Optigan
- Dave Rawlings – piano
- Van Dyke Parks – harpsichord, string arrangements
- Gillian Welch – vocals, bass
- Rick Will – bass
- Martin Tillman – cello
- Carla Azar – traps, maracas, drums
- Jim Keltner – banjo, cymbals, drums

Production

- T Bone Burnett – producer, mixing
- David Bither – executive producer
- Mike Piersante – recording engineer, mixing
- Christopher Sirois – assistant recording engineer
- Okhee Kim – assistant recording engineer
- Chris Reynolds – assistant recording engineer
- Doug Boehm – assistant recording engineer
- Gavin Lurssen – mastering
