= Dancing with Danger =

Studio album by Leslie Phillips
- Released: 1984
- Recorded: Bill Schnee Studios (Hollywood, California); Studio Southwest (Dallas, Texas); Gold Mine Studios (Nashville, Tennessee)
- Genre: CCM, Christian rock
- Label: Myrrh/Word Records
- Producer: Dan Posthuma

Leslie Phillips chronology
Beyond Saturday Night (1983)	Dancing with Danger (1984)	Black and White in a Grey World (1985)

Professional ratings
Review scores
Source	Rating
AllMusic	3/5 stars
The Encyclopedia of Popular Music	2/5 stars

Dancing with Danger is the second album by Leslie Phillips, released in 1984 on Myrrh Records. The album peaked at number 20 on the Billboard Top Inspirational Albums chart.

== Critical reception ==
AllMusic wrote that "while the focus of the album is on dance music, Phillips' pop smarts are already evident, and her songwriting is unconventional (especially for Christian music)."

== Track listing ==
All songs written by Leslie Phillips

=== Side one ===
1. "Dancing with Danger" (remix) – 3:29
2. "I Won't Let It Come Between Us" (remix) – 4:32
3. "Strength of My Life" (guest vocals by Russ Taff) – 5:34
4. "Give 'em All You've Got (Tonight)" – 4:24
5. "By My Spirit" (with Matthew Ward) - 4:43

=== Side two ===
1. "Hiding in the Shadows" – 3:52
2. "Powder Room Politics" – 2:40
3. "Light of Love" – 4:17
4. "Song in the Night" – 3:52
5. "Here He Comes with My Heart" – 2:48

=== CD bonus track ===
1. "By My Spirit" (Radio version) – 5:42

== Personnel ==
- Leslie Phillips – lead vocals, backing vocals
- Jeff Lams – keyboards, arrangements (3, 5-7, 9, 10)
- John Andrew Schreiner – keyboards, arrangements (8)
- Dann Huff – guitars, arrangements (1, 2, 4)
- Nathan East – bass
- Carlos Vega – drums
- Victor Feldman – percussion
- James Hollihan – backing vocals
- Buddy Owens – backing vocals
- Russ Taff – backing vocals
- Greg X. Volz – backing vocals
- Matthew Ward – backing vocals

== Production ==
- Brad Burkhart – executive producer
- Dan Posthuma – producer
- Jeremy Smith – tracking engineer
- Mike McClain – vocal engineer
- Bill Deaton – additional engineer
- John Early – additional engineer
- David Schober – additional engineer
- Bud Wyatt – additional engineer
- Bill Schnee – mixing
- Mike Reese – mastering
- Steve Hall – remastering
- Bradley Grose – photo concept
- Aaron Rapoport – photography
- Vigon/Seireeni – art design

Studios

- Mixed at Eagle Audio Recording (Fort Worth, Texas).
- Originally mastered at The Mastering Lab (Hollywood, California).
- Remastered at Future Disc (North Hollywood, California).

== Charts ==
Chart (1985)	Peak position
US Top Inspirational Albums (Billboard)	20

=== Radio singles ===
Year	Singles	Peak positions	
Year	Singles	CCM AC	CCM CHR
1984	"By My Spirit"	12	12
1984-85	"Here He Comes with My Heart"	6	6
1985	"Strength of My Life"	1	9
1985	"Dancing with Danger"	—	11
1985	"Powder Room Politics	34	—
