= All Night with Me =

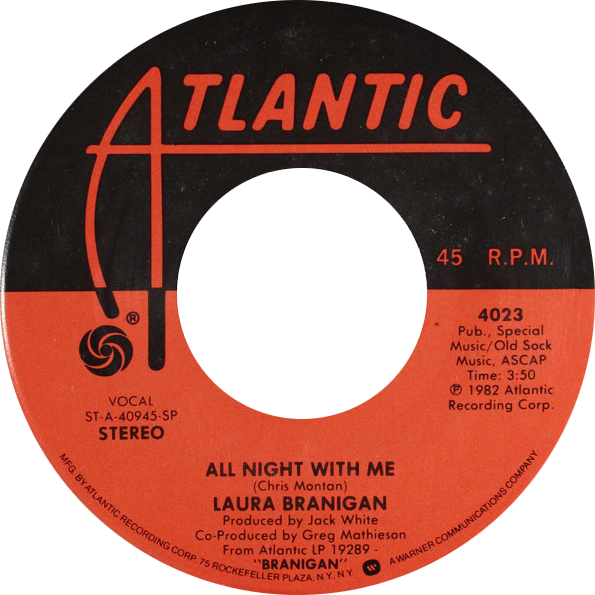
- Side A of US single

Single by Laura Branigan

from the album Branigan
- B-side: "I Wish We Could Be Alone"
- Released: March 1982
- Length: 3:52
- Label: Atlantic
- Songwriter: Chris Montan
- Producer: Jack White

Laura Branigan singles chronology
"Tell Him" (1981)	"All Night with Me" (1982)	"Gloria" (1982)

"All Night with Me" is a song by the American pop singer Laura Branigan, released in 1982 as the lead single from her debut studio album Branigan. It was written by Chris Montan and produced by Jack White. "All Night with Me" was released in the United States and Germany, and reached No. 69 on the US Billboard Hot 100.

Branigan's debut single, "All Night with Me" preceded her US No. 2 hit "Gloria". In Germany, Branigan promoting the single by performing it on the TV music show Disco.

== Critical reception ==
Upon release, Cash Box described the song as a "seductive plea" and later in 1983 referred to it as an "overlooked single". In a review of the album, Stereo Review commented "only "All Night with Me" rises above the level of mediocrity". In a retrospective review, Bryan Buss of AllMusic was critical of the song, describing it as an "over-synthesized and borderline-boring ballad", which along with the album track "Lovin' You Baby", "are so mediocre, the album would be stronger if they had simply been omitted".

== Track listing ==
7" single

1. "All Night with Me" - 3:52
2. "I Wish We Could Be Alone" - 3:18

7" single (US promo)

1. "All Night with Me" - 3:50
2. "All Night with Me" - 3:50

== Chart performance ==
Chart (1982)	Peak position
U.S. Billboard Hot 100	69

== Personnel ==
- Laura Branigan - vocals
- Jack White - producer
- Greg Mathieson - arranger, co-producer
- Juergen Koppers - mixing, recorded by
- John Kovarek - recorded by
- Brian Gardner - mastering

== Other versions ==
Songwriter Chris Montan - who had played keyboards and guitar in Karla Bonoff's touring band 1977-79 - introduced "All Night With Me" on his 1980 album Any Minute Now. Also in 1980 Maxine Nightingale recorded the song for her album Bittersweet from which it was issued as a single.
