= The Indescribable Wow =

Studio album by Sam Phillips
- Released: August 9, 1988
- Studio: Ocean Way Recording (Los Angeles, California); Sunset Sound (Hollywood, California).
- Genre: Pop, rock
- Length: 34:16
- Label: Virgin
- Producer: T Bone Burnett

Sam Phillips chronology
| Recollection (1987) | The Indescribable Wow (1988) | Cruel Inventions (1991) |

The Indescribable Wow is the fifth studio album from American singer and songwriter Sam Phillips. It is her first album for Virgin Records and her first album she released after moving from Christian pop to secular alternative rock and using the name Sam rather than Leslie. The single "Holding On to the Earth" peaked at No. 22 on the Billboard Modern Rock Tracks chart in early 1989.

== Reception ==
Professional ratings
Review scores
| Source | Rating |
|---|---|
| AllMusic | 4/5 stars |

The Indescribable Wow was well received. In Rolling Stone the reviewer said, "Phillips is a major talent, with great rewards to offer" while AllMusic states that the album's music is "timeless".

== Track listing ==
All tracks are written by name except where noted.

| No. | Title | Writer(s) | Length |
|---|---|---|---|
| 1. | "I Don't Want to Fall In Love" | | 2:54 |
| 2. | "I Don't Know How to Say Goodbye to You" | | 3:19 |
| 3. | "Flame" | | 2:35 |
| 4. | "Remorse" | | 3:43 |
| 5. | "What Do I Do" | | 3:58 |
| 6. | "I Can't Stop Crying" | | 3:21 |
| 7. | "Holding On to the Earth" | Sam Phillips, T Bone Burnett | 3:02 |
| 8. | "She Can't Tell Time" | | 3:58 |
| 9. | "What You Don't Want to Hear" | Sam Phillips, T Bone Burnett | 3:05 |
| 10. | "Out of Time" | | 4:24 |

== Personnel ==
- Sam Phillips – vocals, guitars
- Mike Utley – organ
- David Miner – harpsichord, harmonium, bass
- T Bone Burnett – guitars, mandocello, Marxophone, arrangements (5)
- Jerry Scheff – bass
- Mickey Curry – drums
- Steve Jordan – drums
- Alex Acuña – drums, percussion
- Ralph Forbes – drum machine
- Darrell Leonard – trumpet
- Buell Neidlinger – cello, string bass
- Van Dyke Parks – arrangements (5)

== Production ==
- T Bone Burnett – producer
- Rik Pekkonen – recording
- Tchad Blake – additional recording
- Mike Ross – recording assistant
- Dave Knight – assistant engineer
- Clif Norrell – assistant engineer
- Brian Soucy – assistant engineer
- Kevin Killen – mixing
- Howie Weinberg – mastering at Masterdisk (New York City, New York)
- Jeff Ayeroff – art direction
- Mick Haggerty – art direction, design, cover photography
- Melanie Nissen – back and inside photography
