= Martinis & Bikinis =

Studio album by Sam Phillips
- Released: March 8, 1994
- Studio: Groove Masters (Santa Monica); Kiva West (Los Angeles); Ocean Way (Hollywood, California); Record One (Los Angeles); Sunset Sound (Hollywood, California); Sunset Sound Factory (Los Angeles)
- Genre: Rock, alternative rock
- Length: 46:13
- Label: Virgin
- Producer: T Bone Burnett

Sam Phillips chronology
Cruel Inventions (1991)	Martinis & Bikinis (1994)	Omnipop (It's Only a Flesh Wound Lambchop) (1996)

Professional ratings
Review scores
Source	Rating
AllMusic	4.5/5 stars
American Songwriter	4.5/5 stars
Chicago Tribune	3.5/4 stars
Christgau's Consumer Guide	(1-star Honorable Mention)
Entertainment Weekly	A
Los Angeles Times	3.5/4 stars
Mojo	4/5 stars
PopMatters	8/10
Rolling Stone	4/5 stars
The Rolling Stone Album Guide	4/5 stars

Martinis & Bikinis is the seventh studio album by American singer and songwriter Sam Phillips. It was released on March 8, 1994, and re-released on July 17, 2012. "Circle of Fire" was nominated for Best Female Rock Vocal Performance at the 37th Annual Grammy Awards. The album was dedicated to actor River Phoenix.

== Track listing ==
All tracks are written by Sam Phillips, except where noted.

No.	Title	Writer(s)	Length
1.	"Love and Kisses"		0:56
2.	"Signposts"		2:19
3.	"Same Rain"	Sam Phillips, T Bone Burnett	4:11
4.	"Baby, I Can't Please You"		3:30
5.	"Circle of Fire"		3:12
6.	"Strawberry Road"		4:05
7.	"When I Fall"		5:07
8.	"Same Changes"	Phillips, Burnett	4:44
9.	"Black Sky"		4:03
10.	"Fighting with Fire"		3:00
11.	"I Need Love"		3:39
12.	"Wheel of the Broken Voice"		4:00
13.	"Gimme Some Truth"	John Lennon	3:27

== Personnel ==
Credits adapted from CD liner notes.

Musicians

- Sam Phillips
- T Bone Burnett
- Mickey Curry
- David Mansfield
- Jerry Scheff

Guests

- Michael Blair
- Peter Buck
- Colin Moulding
- Marvin Etzioni
- Don Heffington
- Van Dyke Parks
- Marc Ribot
- Larry Taylor
- Benmont Tench
- Sid Page Strings:
  - Sid Page
  - Joel Derouin
  - Robert Becker
  - Larry Corbett

Technical

- T Bone Burnett – producer
- Colin Moulding – co-producer (4)
- Joe Schiff – engineer
- Neal Avron – additional engineering
- Tchad Blake – mixing
- John Paterno – mixing assistant
- Jim Champagne – assistant engineer
- David Eike – assistant engineer
- David Brock – assistant engineer
- Doug Diamond – assistant engineer
- Noel Hazen – assistant engineer
- Tom Nellen – assistant engineer
- Howard Willing – assistant engineer
- Bobby Salcedo – assistant engineer
- Van Dyke Parks – string arranger (4)
- Bob Ludwig – mastering
- Len Peltier – art direction
- P. R. Brown – design
- Geof Kern – photography

== Charts ==
Chart	Peak position
New Zealand Albums (RMNZ)	30
US Billboard 200	182
US Heatseekers Albums (Billboard)	9
