= Beyond Saturday Night =

Studio album by Leslie Phillips
- Released: 1983
- Genre: CCM, Christian Rock
- Label: Myrrh/Word Records
- Producer: Jack Joseph Puig

Leslie Phillips chronology
Beyond Saturday Night (1983)	Dancing with Danger (1984)

Beyond Saturday Night is the first album by Leslie Phillips, released in 1983 on Myrrh Records. The album's style is placed between the contemporary Christian music artist Amy Grant, the Christian rocker Margaret Becker, and the hard rock group Resurrection Band.

== Track listing ==
All songs written by Leslie Phillips, except where noted.

Side one

1. "Hourglass" – 3:33
2. "Gina" (Leslie Phillips, Matthew Chapman, Purvis Orso) – 3:36
3. "Put Your Heart in Me" – 4:05
4. "I'm Finding" – 3:26
5. "Beyond Saturday Night" (John Fischer) – 4:30

Side two

1. "Bring Me Through" – 4:49
2. "Heart of Hearts" (Mark Heard) – 3:16
3. "Will They Love Him" (Leslie Phillips, Daniel Brown) – 4:34
4. "He's Gonna Hear You Crying" – 3:14
5. "Let Me Give" – 3:47

== Personnel ==
- Leslie Phillips – lead vocals, backing vocals
- Robbie Buchanan – keyboards
- John Hobbs – keyboards, synthesizers
- John Andrew Schreiner – keyboards, synthesizers
- Michael Landau – guitars
- Randy Thomas – guitars
- Leland Sklar – bass
- Nathan East – bass
- Carlos Vega – drums
- Bob Carlisle – backing vocals
- Bryan Duncan – backing vocals

== Production ==
- Doug Corbin – executive producer
- Jack Joseph Puig – producer, recording
- David Schober – assistant engineer
- Mike Reese – mastering
- Doug Sax – mastering
- Susan Pyron – production coordinator
- Steve Elowe – album design
- Paul Gross – album design
- Ronald E. Garman – sleeve layout and design
- Design Oasis – hand tinting
- Aaron Rapoport – photography
- Leslie Phillips – liner notes
- David Seay – liner notes

Studios

- Recorded at Bill Schnee Studios and Mama Jo's Studios (North Hollywood, California); Goldmine West (Beverly Hills, California).
- Mastered at The Mastering Lab (Hollywood, California).

== Radio Singles ==
Year	Singles	Peak positions
Year	Singles	CCM AC
1983	"Heart of Hearts"	14
1983	"I'm Finding"	31
