= Skin Deep (Cher song) =

Single by Cher

from the album Cher
- B-side: "Perfection"
- Released: July 1988 (US); August 22, 1988 (UK)
- Recorded: 1986–1987
- Studio: The Grey Room (Los Angeles, CA); One on One Studio (North Hollywood, CA)
- Genre: Dance-rock
- Length: 4:16
- Label: Geffen
- Songwriters: Mark Goldenberg; Jon Lind
- Producer: Jon Lind

Cher singles chronology
"We All Sleep Alone" (1988)	"Skin Deep" (1988)	"Main Man" (1988)

"Skin Deep" is a rock song originally written in 1986 for Japanese singer-songwriter Cindy by Mark Goldenberg and Jon Lind, then covered by American singer-actress Cher for her eighteenth studio album, Cher. It was released as the album's third single in mid-1988.

== Background ==
Allmusic's Jose F. Promis later described it as "a club hit with the almost forgotten Madonna-ish dance ditty "Skin Deep" (a radical departure from the album's other songs, yet a definite highlight)."

== Track listing ==
- US and European 7" and cassette single
1. "Skin Deep" (Edit/Remix) – 3:54
2. "Perfection" – 4:28
- US 12" single
1. "Skin Deep" (Extended Dance Mix) – 7:48
2. "Skin Deep" (Dub) – 5:40
3. "Skin Deep" (Bonus Beats) – 3:40
4. "Perfection" – 4:28
- European 12" and CD single
1. "Skin Deep" (Extended Dance Mix) – 7:48
2. "Skin Deep" (Dub) – 5:40
3. "Perfection" – 4:28

== Charts ==
Chart (1988)	Peak position
US Billboard Hot 100	79
US Dance Club Songs (Billboard)	41
US Cash Box Top 100	78
