= Cher (1987 album) =

Studio album by Cher
- Released: November 10, 1987
- Recorded: 1986–1987
- Studios: A&M (Hollywood); Bearsville (Woodstock); Electric Lady (New York); Giant Sound (New York); Grey Room (Los Angeles); Ocean Way (Hollywood); One on One (North Hollywood); Power Station (New York); Record One (Los Angeles); Schnee Studio (Los Angeles); Soundtrack Recording (New York); The Complex (Los Angeles); Hit Factory (New York)
- Genres: Pop rock; rock
- Length: 39:48
- Label: Geffen
- Producers: Michael Bolton; Jon Bon Jovi; Richie Sambora; Desmond Child; Peter Asher; Jon Lind

Cher chronology
I Paralyze (1982)	Cher (1987)	Heart of Stone (1989)

Singles from Cher
- 1. "I Found Someone" Released: November 19, 1987; 2. "We All Sleep Alone" Released: January 28, 1988; 3. "Skin Deep" Released: July 1988; 4. "Main Man" Released: October 1988

Cher is the eighteenth studio album by American singer-actress Cher, released on November 10, 1987, by Geffen Records. The album has been certified Platinum in the US by the RIAA and Gold in Australia by ARIA and the UK by BPI.

== Background ==
Five years after the release of Cher's last album, I Paralyze, and her decision to focus on a film career, Cher signed with Geffen Records (which would later absorb one of her former labels, MCA Records) and was rushed to the studio to record what would become her comeback album. The album, Cher, was released in the fall of 1987 and was produced by Michael Bolton, Jon Bon Jovi, Richie Sambora and Desmond Child. Among the notable guest artists, Bonnie Tyler and Darlene Love were backing vocalists on "Perfection".

After a series of pop and disco records, Cher moved to a radio-friendly rock sound, which helped her get back onto the charts. The album includes a new version of her 1966 hit "Bang Bang (My Baby Shot Me Down)", Michael Bolton's "I Found Someone"—which Bolton and Mark Mangold had originally written for Laura Branigan, released on her 1985 album Hold Me—several songs written by Desmond Child, and two by Diane Warren, who would go on to write many more songs for the singer.

This was also her third album to be named Cher or Chér, as Gypsys, Tramps & Thieves was initially released under the name Chér before it was retitled following the success of the single of the same name, while a studio album in 1966 was also titled Chér.

== Promotion ==
On November 13, 1987, Cher appeared on Late Night with David Letterman, where she performed "I Found Someone" and "I Got You Babe", the latter with ex-husband Sonny Bono. Later released on VHS, the Late Night performance would be her last with Bono before his death. On November 21, Cher appeared as the musical guest on Saturday Night Live, performing "I Found Someone" and "We All Sleep Alone". The album was also promoted on UK television.

== Commercial performance ==
The album reached No. 26 in the UK and peaked at No. 32 on the US Billboard albums chart. The first single released from the album and its only UK top 10 hit was "I Found Someone", which reached No. 5 in the UK and No. 10 in the US. The second single, "We All Sleep Alone", peaked at No. 14 on Billboard's Hot 100 chart and just missed breaking the Adult Contemporary top 10 in the US, reaching No. 11. It was less successful in the UK, however, peaking at No. 47. The album's third single was "Skin Deep". The fourth and final single was "Main Man", released in the US and Australia in October 1988.

"Bang Bang", was released as a promotional single in Europe.

== Critical reception ==
Professional ratings
Review scores
Source	Rating
AllMusic	4/5 stars
New Musical Express	2/10
The Rolling Stone Album Guide	3/5 stars

Billboard noted that Cher marked the singer's return to recording after "a protracted period of concentration on acting", highlighting "We All Sleep Alone" and the "demimetal remake" of her 1960s hit "Bang Bang (My Baby Shot Me Down)" as the album's main attractions. Cashbox noted that Cher benefited from songwriting by Desmond Child, Michael Bolton and others stating that they "lay the groundwork for Cher's impassioned vocal histrionics" while praising the album's "dramatic" arrangements and "strong AOR sheen".

AllMusic described Cher as a "highly successful musical comeback", highlighting "I Found Someone", "We All Sleep Alone", and "Skin Deep" as standout hits, calling the latter "a definite highlight", while also praising tracks such as "Perfection", "Dangerous Times", "Give Our Love a Fighting Chance", and the "wonderfully sweet ballad", "Main Man".

== Track listing ==
Cher track listing
No.	Title	Writer(s)	Producer(s)	Length
1.	"I Found Someone"	Michael Bolton; Mark Mangold	Bolton	3:42
2.	"We All Sleep Alone"	Desmond Child; Jon Bon Jovi; Richie Sambora	Child; Bon Jovi; Sambora	3:53
3.	"Bang-Bang" (1987 version)	Sonny Bono	Child; Bon Jovi; Sambora	3:51
4.	"Main Man"	Child	Child	3:48
5.	"Give Our Love a Fightin' Chance"	Child; Diane Warren	Child	4:06
6.	"Perfection" (featuring Bonnie Tyler and Darlene Love)	Child; Warren	Child	4:28
7.	"Dangerous Times"	Roger Bruno; Susan Pomerantz; Ellen Schwartz	Peter Asher	3:01
8.	"Skin Deep"	Jon Lind; Mark Goldenberg	Lind	4:16
9.	"Working Girl"	Bolton; Child	Child	3:57
10.	"Hard Enough Getting Over You"	Bolton; Doug James	Bolton	3:48

== Personnel ==
Adapted from AllMusic.

- Cher – vocals
- Phillip Ashley – keyboards (1, 10)
- Jeff Bova – keyboards (1, 10)
- Doug Katsaros – keyboards (1)
- David Bryan – keyboards (2, 3), synthesizers (2)
- Chuck Kentis – additional keyboards (2, 3), keyboards (4–6, 9), synthesizers (4–6, 9)
- Bette Sussman – acoustic piano (4)
- Gregg Mangiafico – keyboards (5, 6, 9), synthesizers (5, 6, 9)
- Bill Payne – keyboards (7)
- John Van Tongeren – synthesizers (8), synth bass (8)
- Mark Morgan – synth organ (8)
- Steve Lukather – guitars (1)
- John McCurry – guitars (1, 4–6, 10)
- Richie Sambora – guitars (2, 3), backing vocals (2)
- John Putnam – guitars (4, 9)
- Michael Landau – guitars (7)
- Waddy Wachtel – guitars (7)
- Bob Mann – guitar solo (7)
- Michael Thompson – guitars (8)
- Ira Siegel – guitars (10)
- Will Lee – bass (1, 10)
- Alec John Such – bass (2, 3)
- Seth Glassman – bass (4)
- John Siegler – bass (5)
- Larry Klein – bass (7)
- Jimmy Haslip – bass (8)
- Tony Levin – bass (9)
- Chris Parker – drums (1)
- Tico Torres – drums (2, 3)
- Jerry Marotta – drums (4–6, 9)
- Jimmy Bralower – drums (6, 9)
- Carlos Vega – drums (7)
- Craig Krampf – drums (8), drum programming (8)
- Albhy Galuten – drums (10)
- Peter Asher – percussion (7)
- Michael Fisher – percussion (7)
- Pattie Darcy – backing vocals (1, 10)
- Desmond Child – backing vocals (2–4, 9)
- Jon Bon Jovi – backing vocals (2, 3)
- Holly Knight – backing vocals (2), additional keyboards (3)
- Louis Merlino – backing vocals (2, 4–6, 9)
- Nancy Nash – backing vocals (2)
- Bernie Shanahan – backing vocals (2, 3, 9)
- Joe Lynn Turner – backing vocals (2–4, 6, 9)
- Michael Bolton – backing vocals (3)
- Diana Grasselli – backing vocals (3, 6)
- Dave Meniketti – backing vocals (3)
- Myriam Valle – backing vocals (3–6, 9)
- Elaine Caswell – backing vocals (4–6, 9)
- Diane Warren – backing vocals (6)
- Darlene Love – featured vocals (6)
- Bonnie Tyler – featured vocals (6)
- Rosemary Butler – backing vocals (7)
- Arnold McCuller – backing vocals (7)
- Debra Dobkin – backing vocals (8)
- Julia Waters – backing vocals (8)
- Maxine Waters – backing vocals (8)
- Maurice White – vamp vocals (8)
- Vicki Sue Robinson – backing vocals (1, 10)

=== Production ===
- Jolie Jones Levine – assistant producer (8)
- Albhy Galuten – additional production (10)
- Deborah Paull – album coordination
- Melanie F. Williams – album coordination
- Gabrielle Raumberger – art direction, design, hand tinting
- Matthew Rolston – photography
- Bob Mackie – wardrobe
- Michael Schmidt – wardrobe

Technical

- Greg Fulginiti – mastering at Artisan Sound Recorders (Hollywood, California)
- Michael Christopher – recording (1, 10)
- David Thoener – mixing (1, 4–6, 8–10)
- Sir Arthur Payson – recording (2–6, 9)
- Bob Rock – mixing (2, 3)
- Frank Wolf – recording (7), mixing (7)
- Daren Klein – recording (8)
- Csaba Petocz – recording (8)
- Rob Jacobs – additional engineer (2, 3)
- Shelly Yakus – additional engineer (3)
- Gene Parciasepe – additional engineer (6, 9)
- Mark Partis – additional engineer (10)
- Thom Cadley – assistant engineer
- George Cowan – assistant engineer
- Bridget Daly – assistant engineer
- Jim Dineen – assistant engineer
- Chris Floberg – assistant engineer
- Jay Healy – assistant engineer
- Chris Isca – assistant engineer
- Chris Laidlaw – assistant engineer
- Matthew LaMonica – assistant engineer
- Ken Lomas – assistant engineer
- Frank Pekoc – assistant engineer
- Sharon Rice – assistant engineer
- Brian Scheuble – assistant engineer
- Gary Solomon – assistant engineer
- Ken Steiger – assistant engineer
- Ted Trewhella – assistant engineer
- Jim Vanzino – assistant engineer
- Bob Vogt – assistant engineer
- Gary Wright – assistant engineer

== Charts ==
=== Weekly charts ===
Weekly chart performance for Cher
Chart (1987–1988)	Peak position
Australian Albums (Kent Music Report)	26
Canadian Albums (RPM)	39
European Albums (Top 100)	80
Swedish Albums (Sverigetopplistan)	44
UK Albums (Official Charts)	26
US Billboard 200	32
US Cash Box Top 100 Albums	39

=== Year-end charts ===
Year-end chart performance for Cher
Chart (1988)	Position
US Billboard 200	67

== Certifications and sales ==
Certifications and sales for Cher
Region	Certification	Certified units/sales
Australia (ARIA)	Gold	35,000^{^}
United Kingdom (BPI)	Gold	100,000^{^}
United States (RIAA)	Platinum	1,000,000^{^}
^{^} Shipments figures based on certification alone.
