= Martine Clémenceau =

French singer

Martine Clémenceau (born 18 March 1949) is a French singer.

She won the Yamaha Music Festival in 1971 with the song "A jour l’amour". Then, she represented France in the Eurovision Song Contest in 1973 with "Sans toi", taking the 15th place.

Her song "Solitaire", written in 1981 is her most important hit in France, and Laura Branigan in 1983 recorded a cover that was #7 in the US, and #8 in Canada.

She sang "Quelquefois" as a duet with Claude François and during the 1990s. She wrote songs especially for Herbert Léonard. In 2005 she received the René Jeanne Prize.

Preceded by Betty Mars with Comé-comédie	France in the Eurovision Song Contest; 1973	Succeeded by Nicole Rieu with Et bonjour à toi l'artiste
