= Black and White in a Grey World =

Studio album by Leslie Phillips
- Released: 1985
- Studio: Bill Schnee Studios (Hollywood, California); Goldmine Studios (Ventura, California); Redwing Studios (Tarzana, California); Wayne Cook Studios (Glendale, California)
- Genre: CCM, Christian rock
- Label: Myrrh/Word Records
- Producer: Dan Posthuma

Leslie Phillips chronology
Dancing with Danger (1984)	Black and White in a Grey World (1985)	The Turning (1987)

Black and White in a Grey World is the third album by Leslie Phillips, released in 1985 on Myrrh Records. Phillips picked up her first Grammy Award nomination (as Leslie Phillips) for Best Gospel Performance, Female at the 28th Grammy Awards. The album peaked at number 13 on the Billboard Top Inspirational Albums chart.

== Track listing ==
All songs written by Leslie Phillips, except where noted.

Side one

1. "Black And White in a Grey World" – 4:20
2. "Tug of War" – 3:21
3. "When The World Is New" – 4:31
4. "Psalm 55" – 3:49
5. "Your Kindness" – 4:02
6. "Larger Than Life" – 3:44

Side two

1. "The More I Know You" – 5:02
2. "Smoke Screen" (Phillips, Daniel Brown) – 3:38
3. "You're My Lord" – 4:14
4. "Walls of Silence" – 4:54
5. "You're the Same" – 4:15
6. "Love Is Not Lost" – 3:46

Note: Cassette and LP versions did not include "Larger Than Life" and "Love Is Not Lost". However, these tracks were issued on vinyl in Australia. "Love Is Not Lost" would later be rerecorded for Phillips' 1987 album, The Turning.

== Personnel ==
- Leslie Phillips – vocals
- Alan Pasqua – keyboards, track arrangements
- John Andrew Schreiner – keyboards, Fairlight CMI, track arrangements
- Rhett Lawrence – Fairlight programming, track arrangements
- Dann Huff – guitars, track arrangements
- Nathan East – bass
- Neil Stubenhaus – bass
- Carlos Vega – drums
- John Robinson – drums
- Paulinho da Costa – percussion
- Dawn Bianchi – backing vocals
- John Flynn – backing vocals
- Kurt Howell – backing vocals
- Dan Posthuma – backing vocals
- Táta Vega – backing vocals
- Matthew Ward – backing vocals
- Bill Schnee – background voices
- Cheryl Wilks – background voices

== Production ==
- Brad Burkhart – executive producer
- Dan Posthuma – producer
- Dan Garcia – engineer
- Dennis McKay – engineer
- Rick Riggeri – engineer
- Bill Schnee – mixing
- Doug Sax – mastering
- The Mastering Lab (Hollywood, California) – mastering location
- Aaron Rapoport – photography
- Bradley Grose – art direction, design

== Charts ==
Chart (1985)	Peak position
US Top Inspirational Albums (Billboard)	13

=== Radio singles ===
Year	Singles	Peak positions	
Year	Singles	CCM AC	CCM CHR
1985-86	"Your Kindness"	2	1
1986	"You're the Same"	1	-
1986	"The More I Know You"	-	7
1986	"When The World Is New"	19	-
1986	"Psalm 55"	-	8
1986-87	"You're My Lord"	37	-
