= Hard Enough Getting Over You =

"It's Been Hard Enough Getting Over You"

Single by Laura Branigan

from the album Over My Heart
- B-side: "Didn't We Almost Win It All"
- Released: 1993
- Recorded: 1993
- Genre: Pop rock
- Length: 3:41
- Label: Atlantic
- Songwriter(s): Michael Bolton; Doug James
- Producer(s): Phil Ramone

Laura Branigan singles chronology
"Didn't We Almost Win It All" (1993)	"It's Been Hard Enough Getting Over You" (1993)	"How Can I Help You to Say Goodbye" (1993)

"Hard Enough Getting Over You" is a song written by Michael Bolton and Doug James. It was first recorded by Cher for her 1987 self-titled album. In 1993, Laura Branigan released a cover of the song, retitled "It's Been Hard Enough Getting Over You", as the second single from her final studio album, Over My Heart (1993). Branigan promoted the release with several television appearances including an interview on Good Day L.A., where she also performed the song live. However, despite this, the song, along with the other two singles and the album itself, was largely overlooked by critics and the general public.

== Critical reception ==
Larry Flick from Billboard magazine wrote, "Branigan easily musters the drama required to make this Michael Bolton composition work. In fact, her roof-raising soprano shoulders against the song' parameters, soaring to a satisfying climax. It is little wonder that AC programmers are frothing over this one. Strong enough to bring the singer back onto mainstream top 40 playlists."

== Track listing ==
CD single
No.	Title	Length
1.	"It's Been Hard Enough Getting Over You"	3:41
2.	"Didn't We Almost Win It All"	5:09
