= Carlos Vega =

American drummer (1956–1998)

Carlos Vega (December 7, 1956 – April 7, 1998) was a Cuban-born Los Angeles-based session drummer best known for his performances with James Taylor. As a part of the L.A. studio scene from the late 1970s through the 1990s, Vega contributed to a wide variety of music during the rise and popularity of the California singer-songwriter movement.

== History ==
Carlos Vega was born in Cuba on December 7, 1956, and grew up in Los Angeles, California with his parents and older sister, Sue. He attended Eagle Rock High School in a suburb of Los Angeles. He knew Grant High School students and collaborated with such future artists as Michael Landau, Jeff Porcaro, and Steve Lukather.

Vega co-formed his first band, Karizma, in 1975 with Michael Landau, David Garfield, Lenny Castro, and Jimmy Johnson.

Vega performed with a wide variety of musicians across many genres, including a 13-year collaboration with James Taylor (featured on Live, Hourglass, Never Die Young, and New Moon Shine) and on Olivia Newton-John's double platinum album, Physical. He performed on the soundtrack for the film Grease.

Vega influenced drummer Jeff Porcaro, who was a Los Angeles-based studio musician and drummer for Toto.

During a break from a James Taylor tour, on April 7, 1998, Vega died of a self-inflicted gunshot wound. While most media reports stated that he died at home, it has also been written that his body was found on a deserted road overlooking Los Angeles.

Since his death, there have been annual Carlos Vega Memorial Birthday Concerts, featuring drummers such as Steve Ferrone and John Robinson.

== Selected discography ==
- Caldera 1 - Caldera (1976)
- Sky Islands - Caldera (1977)
- Born Late - Shaun Cassidy (1977)
- Under Wraps - Shaun Cassidy (1978)
- Pretty Girls - Lisa Dal Bello (1979)
- Exhibition - John Serry (1979)
- Jazziz - John Serry (1980)
- He Who Rides the Tiger - Bernie Taupin (1980)
- This Time - Al Jarreau (1980)
- Bi-Coastal - Peter Allen (1980)
- Barry - Barry Manilow (1980)
- Give Me the Night - George Benson (1980)
- Physical - Olivia Newton-John (1981)
- Tootsie - Dave Grusin (1982)
- Branigan - Laura Branigan (1982)
- Born to Love - Peabo Bryson, Roberta Flack (1983)
- Toni Basil - Toni Basil (1983)
- Best Kept Secret - Sheena Easton (1983)
- In Your Eyes - George Benson (1983)
- Emergency - Melissa Manchester (1983)
- Merciless - Stephanie Mills (1983)
- Beyond Saturday Night - Sam Phillips (1983)
- Branigan 2 - Laura Branigan (1983)
- Airborne - Don Felder (1983)
- How Many Times Can We Say Goodbye - Dionne Warwick (1983)
- Bombom - Rita Lee (1983)
- A Private Heaven - Sheena Easton (1984)
- Self Control - Laura Branigan (1984)
- Straight from the Heart - Peabo Bryson (1984)
- Dancing with Danger - Sam Phillips (1984)
- Black and White in a Grey World - Sam Phillips (1985)
- Sleeping with Girls - Stephen Bishop (1985)
- Schuur Thing - Diane Schuur (1985)
- 20/20 - George Benson (1985)
- Soul Kiss - Olivia Newton-John (1985)
- Finder of Lost Loves - Dionne Warwick (1985)
- Mathematics - Melissa Manchester (1985)
- Nine Lives - Bonnie Raitt (1986)
- They Don't Make Them Like They Used To - Kenny Rogers (1986)
- Headed for the Future - Neil Diamond (1986)
- Hot on the Trail - Deniece Williams (1986)
- Winner in You - Patti LaBelle (1986)
- Earth Run - Lee Ritenour (1986)
- Everlasting - Natalie Cole (1987)
- Emotion - Juice Newton (1987)
- Touch - Laura Branigan (1987)
- Brazilian Romance - Sarah Vaughan (1987)
- Reservations for Two - Dionne Warwick (1987)
- After Dark - Ray Parker Jr. (1987)
- The Way Back Home - Vince Gill (1987)
- Cher - Cher (1987)
- Land of Dreams - Randy Newman (1988)
- Till I Loved You - Barbra Streisand (1988)
- Heart's Horizon - Al Jarreau (1988)
- Justice - Steve Camp (1988)
- The Rumour - Olivia Newton-John (1988)
- Never Die Young - James Taylor (1988)
- The Best Years of Our Lives - Neil Diamond (1988)
- Cry Like a Rainstorm, Howl Like the Wind - Linda Ronstadt, Aaron Neville (1989)
- Lukather - Steve Lukather (1989)
- Heart of Stone - Cher (1989)
- Some People's Lives - Bette Midler (1990)
- Pure Schuur - Diane Schuur (1991)
- Lovescape - Neil Diamond (1991)
- Warm Your Heart - Aaron Neville (1991)
- New Moon Shine - James Taylor (1991)
- Love Hurts - Cher (1991)
- Romances- Luis Miguel (1991)
- When You're a Boy - Susanna Hoffs (1991)
- Rendezvous - Christopher Cross (1992)
- I Still Believe in You - Vince Gill (1992)
- Soul Talkin' - Brenda Russell (1993)
- Up on the Roof: Songs from the Brill Building - Neil Diamond (1993)
- River of Souls - Dan Fogelberg (1993)
- Let There Be Peace on Earth - Vince Gill (1993)
- When Love Finds You - Vince Gill (1994)
- Turbulent Indigo - Joni Mitchell (1994)
- Falling Forward - Julia Fordham (1994)
- The Christmas Album, Volume II - Neil Diamond (1994)
- If My Heart Had Wings - Melissa Manchester (1995)
- High Lonesome Sound - Vince Gill (1996)
- It's Good, Eve - Vonda Shepard (1996)
- Hourglass - James Taylor (1997)
- Wanting - Gabriela Anders (1998)
- Timbre - Sophie B. Hawkins (1999)
