= Sam Phillips (musician, born 1962) =

American singer-songwriter

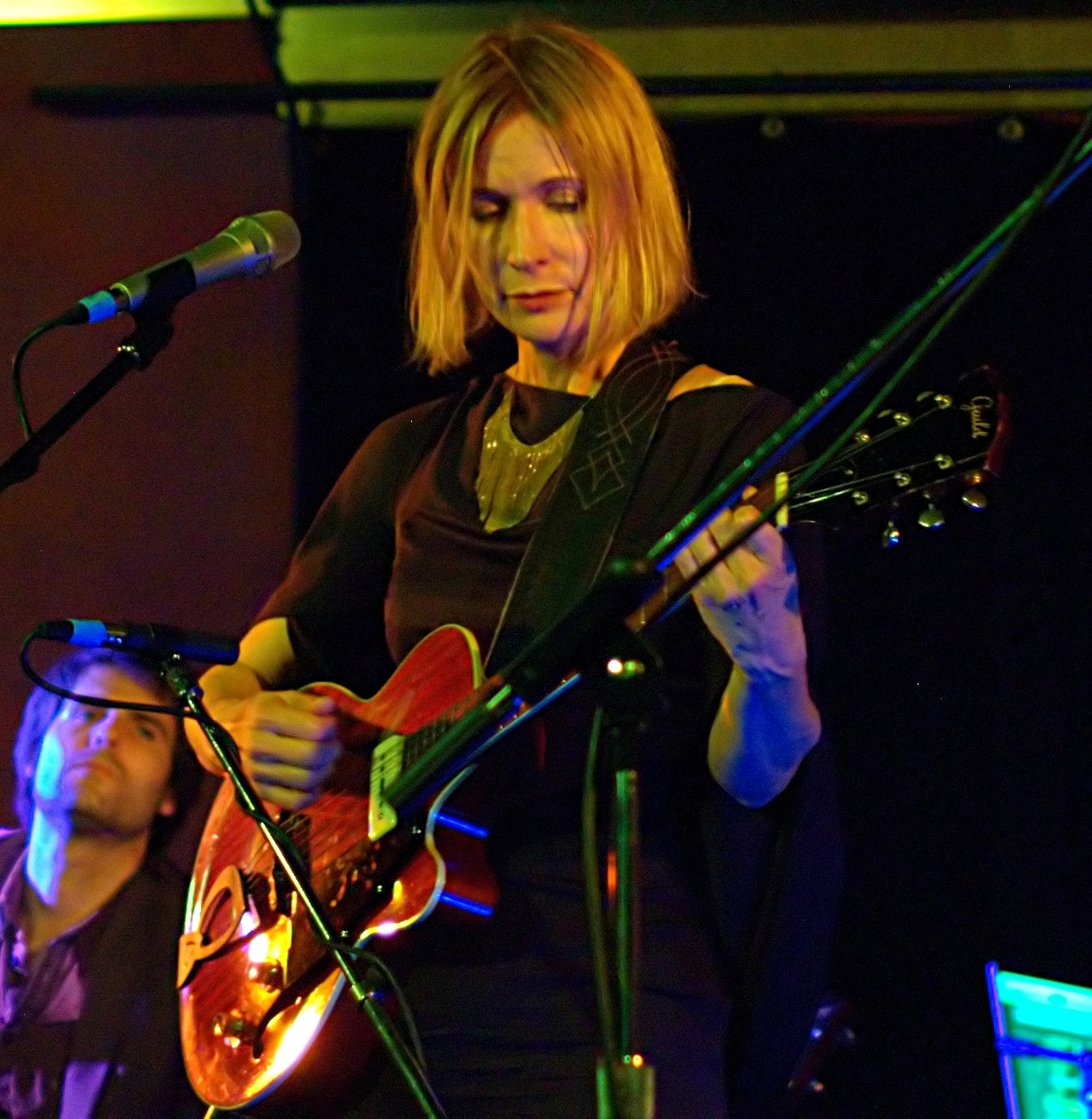
- Phillips on stage in Toronto, Ontario, Canada

Background information
- Born: Leslie Ann Phillips; January 28, 1962 (age 64); Glendale, California, U.S.
- Genres: Alternative rock, pop
- Occupations: Singer, songwriter
- Instruments: Vocals, guitar, keyboards
- Years active: 1980–present
- Labels: Myrrh, Virgin, Nonesuch
- Spouses: T Bone Burnett (m. 1989; div. 2004) Eric Gorfain (m. 2010)
- Website: samphillips.com

Leslie Ann "Sam" Phillips (born January 28, 1962) is an American singer, songwriter, and actor. Her albums include the critically acclaimed Martinis & Bikinis in 1994 and Fan Dance in 2001. She has also composed scores for the television shows Gilmore Girls, Bunheads, and The Marvelous Mrs. Maisel.

== Early life ==
Phillips was born in Glendale, California to parents William and Peggy Phillips. She is the second of three children and has a brother and a sister. She was given the nickname Sam, which would later become her stage name.

Phillips started singing at a young age, along with dancing, painting, and playing the piano. Phillips also started studying philosophy and fundamentalism at the age of 14. Phillips began writing songs as a teenager to cope with her parents' divorce.

== Career ==
Phillips began her musical career in the early 1980s in the contemporary Christian music industry, where she sang background vocals for Christian artists Mark Heard and Randy Stonehill.

Phillips was signed as a solo artist with Myrrh Records under her given name and recorded four Christian pop albums: Beyond Saturday Night, Dancing with Danger, Black and White in a Grey World, and The Turning. The Turning teamed her with producer T Bone Burnett, who had worked with artists Bob Dylan, Elvis Costello, and Roy Orbison. The two would later get married.

Several of Phillips' songs became Top 10 singles on Christian radio and Myrrh Records promoted her as "the Christian Cyndi Lauper". Phillips was never comfortable with this image, and it was a bone of contention between her and her label. She began using the name "Sam" professionally in 1988 when she left Myrrh Records and signed with Virgin Records in order to distance herself from her prior persona.

With The Indescribable Wow, Philips moved into mainstream music. The album featured the orchestrations of Van Dyke Parks and took influence from 1960's pop. Cruel Inventions was released in 1991, and included a guest performance by Elvis Costello. 1994's Martinis and Bikinis was widely praised by music critics and was nominated for a Grammy Award, her second nomination (the first was as Leslie Phillips).

In 1995, Phillips made her film acting debut as the mute terrorist Katya in the Bruce Willis blockbuster Die Hard with a Vengeance. In 1996, Phillips released Omnipop (It's Only a Flesh Wound Lambchop), which featured a song co-written by R.E.M. Phillips made a cameo appearance in the 1997 Wim Wenders film The End of Violence, singing part of the song "Animals on Wheels" from Omnipop. After releasing a contractually obligated "best of" album in 1999, Virgin Records dropped Phillips from its roster.

In 2001, Phillips signed with Nonesuch Records, evolving her musical style to a stripped-down, acoustically based sound on her album called Fan Dance, as well as guest appearances from musical partners Gillian Welch on vocals and David Rawlings on piano, for whom T Bone Burnett had produced several years earlier. Phillips also began writing music for and scoring the television series Gilmore Girls, and appeared in the final episode of season six, performing "Taking Pictures" from her Fan Dance album. In 2004, she released A Boot and a Shoe, another collection of acoustically based songs, similar in style to Fan Dance. In 2006 she was ranked at No. 94 on Paste magazine's list of the top 100 living songwriters.

After the release of A Boot and a Shoe, Phillips and T Bone Burnett, who had been her longtime producer, divorced, although they continued to work together to finish her album. Her album Don't Do Anything was self-produced and released in 2008.

In October 2009, Phillips launched The Long Play, a music subscription service offering digital releases without a record label. The first subscription only EP, Hypnotists in Paris, was recorded with the Section Quartet and a Christmas collection Cold Dark Night, Magic for Everyone, Old Tin Pan, and Days of the One Night Stands followed, with the full-length album Cameras in the Sky being released in early 2010. In Spring of 2011 she issued Solid State, a public CD release comprising 13 of the best songs from her subscription service.

In 2012, it was announced that she would be reunited with Gilmore Girls creator Amy Sherman-Palladino by scoring music for the short-lived American TV show Bunheads.

Phillips described her next album, Pretty Time Bomb (later renamed Push Any Button), as being "a nostalgic sort of dream of being a pop star in the 60s and early 70s. It's a sweet kind of album and I don't know where it came from. I don't know what compelled me to make it. It's probably a bad idea, but every time I listen to what I've done, it makes me really happy. So I figure, that must mean something and I should go ahead and put it out there."

Push Any Button was released on August 13, 2013. Phillips has described Push Any Button as 'an impressionistic version of the AM pop radio playing inside her head'—a way of 'looking at the future through the past. For the vinyl release through her website, Phillips created a limited run of unique handmade collages on repurposed vintage LP sleeves sourced from flea markets. In 2015, a suite of these collage artworks were exhibited at Gertrude Contemporary in Melbourne, Australia in an exhibition called Lost and Profound curated by Daniel Mudie Cunningham.

In 2013, Phillips' first live concert album, Sam Phillips: Live @ Largo at The Coronet, was made available digitally through her website, and is also the title of a 2019 documentary directed by Dave Rygalski, who filmed the 2013 performances.

On November 21, 2016, Phillips released an eight-track downloadable EP Human Contact is Never Easy, which included new tracks off her next album World on Sticks.

Phillips reunited with Amy Sherman-Palladino as composer for Gilmore Girls: A Year in the Life, a revival of the television series, which was released on Netflix on November 25, 2016.

In September 2018, Phillips released World on Sticks.

A selection of Sam Phillips' score for Gilmore Girls was released on the Mutant label, in association with Warner Bros' WaterTower Music, in November 2025 on vinyl, cassette, CD and streaming platforms.

== Personal life ==
In 1989, Phillips married producer and musician T-Bone Burnett. Phillips and Burnett divorced in 2004; both have since remarried, Phillips to Eric Gorfain.

== Selected awards ==
- 1985: Grammy Award for Best Gospel Vocal Performance, Female (nominee) for Black and White in a Grey World – as Leslie Phillips
- 1994: Grammy Award for Best Female Rock Vocal Performance (nominee) for "Circle of Fire" from Martinis & Bikinis – as Sam Phillips
- 2011: Image, Denise Levertov Award

== Discography ==
=== Albums ===
==== As Leslie Phillips ====
- 1983: Beyond Saturday Night (Myrrh)
- 1984: Dancing with Danger (Myrrh)
- 1985: Black and White in a Grey World (Myrrh)
- 1987: The Turning (Myrrh)

==== As Sam Phillips ====
- 1988: The Indescribable Wow (Virgin)
- 1991: Cruel Inventions (Virgin)
- 1994: Martinis & Bikinis (Virgin)
- 1996: Omnipop (It's Only a Flesh Wound Lambchop) (Virgin)
- 2001: Fan Dance (Nonesuch)
- 2004: A Boot and a Shoe (Nonesuch)
- 2008: Don't Do Anything (Nonesuch)
- 2011: Cameras in the Sky (Littlebox)
- 2011: Solid State (Littlebox)
- 2013: Push Any Button (Littlebox)
- 2018: World on Sticks (Littlebox)
- 2019: Cold Dark Nights (Littlebox)
- 2025: Gilmore Girls - Soundtrack from the Original Series (Mutant)

=== Digital EPs ===
- 2009: Hypnotists in Paris
- 2009: Cold Dark Night
- 2010: Magic for Everybody
- 2010: Old Tin Pan
- 2010: Days of the One Night Stands
- 2016: Human Contact is Never Easy

=== Compilations ===
==== As Leslie Phillips ====
- 1987: Recollection (Myrrh)
- 2007: The Definitive Collection (Myrrh)

==== As Sam Phillips ====
- 1998: Zero Zero Zero (Virgin)
- 2008: The Disappearing Act 1987–1998 (Raven)

=== Compilation appearances ===
- 1981: Back to the Rock – "Bring Me Through" (Leslie Phillips)
- 1985: The Wedding Album Vol. 2 – "Enough for Me" (Leslie Phillips) - also recompiled in 1988 on Love Songs for Christian Couples
- 1986: Not Gonna Bow – "Black and White in a Grey World" (as Leslie Phillips)
- 1992: A Midnight Clear (soundtrack) – "It Came Upon a Midnight Clear"
- 1994: Prêt-à-Porter (Music From The Motion Picture) – "These Boots Are Made for Walkin'"
- 1994: Melrose Place: The Music – "Baby, I Can't Please You"
- 2002: Maranatha! Anthology: The Artists, 1971–2001 – "Bring Me Through" (Leslie Phillips)
- 2002: Our Little Corner of the World: Music from Gilmore Girls – "Tell Her What She Wants to Know"
- 2002: Hear Music Volume 7: Waking – "Is That Your Zebra?"
- 2003: Music from the NBC Television Series Crossing Jordan – "I Wanna Be Your Man"
- 2009: Crazy Heart - Original Motion Picture Soundtrack – "Reflecting Light"
- 2011: Kings & Queens (with Blackie and the Rodeo Kings) – "Love Lay Me Down"
- 2014: Live From High Fidelity: The Best Of The Podcast Performances – "Can't See Straight" (also on the LP: Rhett Miller covering her song "Broken Circle")
- 2015: Even More Super Hits of the Seventies – "(Last Night) I Didn't Get to Sleep at All"

=== As guest ===
- 1981: Stop the Dominoes by Mark Heard – backing vocals
- 1982: Victims of the Age by Mark Heard – backing vocals
- 1983: Side By Side by The Imperials – guest vocals on "Make My Heart Your Home"
- 1983; Equator by Randy Stonehill – backing vocals
- 1990: Dry Bones Dance by Mark Heard – backing vocals
- 1991: Nothing but a Burning Light by Bruce Cockburn – backing vocals on "Great Big Love"
- 1992: Life Is Messy by Rodney Crowell – backing vocals on "Let's Make Trouble"
- 1992: Satellite Sky by Mark Heard – backing vocals
- 1993: Christmas by Bruce Cockburn - arr. and backing vocals on "It Came Upon a Midnight Clear"
- 1996: Bringing Down the Horse by The Wallflowers – backing vocals on "Invisible City" and "Laughing Out Loud"
- 2015: Airless Midnight by Eszter Balint – backing vocals on "The Mother" and "Exit at 63"

=== Selected collaborations ===
- 2009: Raising Sand by Alison Krauss and Robert Plant – featured Phillips' song “Sister Rosetta Goes Before Us” which originally appeared on Don't Do Anything – the record won Grammy Award for Record of the Year
- 2018: She Remembers Everything by Rosanne Cash – co-wrote title track

=== Singles ===
As Leslie Phillips

Year	Title	Chart positions	Album
Year	Title	US Christian	Album
1983	"Heart of Hearts"	14	Beyond Saturday Night
	"I'm Finding"	31	Beyond Saturday Night
1984	"Make My Heart Your Home" (with Paul Smith and The Imperials)	12	Side By Side
	"By My Spirit" (with Matthew Ward)	12	Dancing with Danger
1985	"Here He Comes with My Heart"	6	Dancing with Danger
	"Strength of My Life" (guest vocals by Russ Taff)	9	Dancing with Danger
	"Dancing with Danger"	11	Dancing with Danger
1986	"Your Kindness"	1	Black and White in a Grey World
	"The More I Know"	7	Black and White in a Grey World
	"Psalm 55"	8	Black and White in a Grey World
1987	"Libera Me"	2	The Turning
	"Love Is Not Lost"	14	The Turning
	"Answers Don't Come Easy"	11	The Turning
1988	"No One But You"	11	Recollection

As Sam Phillips

Year	Title	Chart positions					Album
Year	Title	US Hot 100	US Modern Rock	US Mainstream Rock	US Rock Sales	UK	Album
1989	"Holding on to the Earth"	—	22	—	—	—	The Indescribable Wow
1994	"Baby I Can't Please You"	—	—	—	—	—	Martinis & Bikinis
2016	"Reflecting Light"	—	—	—	15	—	A Boot and a Shoe

== Composer of television music ==
- 2000–2007: Gilmore Girls (153 episodes)
- 2012–2013: Bunheads (18 episodes)
- 2017–2019: The Marvelous Mrs. Maisel (19 episodes)

== Selected filmography ==
- 1993: Ruby in Paradise – opening credits song, "Raised on Promises"
- 1995: Die Hard with a Vengeance – as Katya
- 1997: The End of Violence – as a singer
- 2006: Gilmore Girls – as a troubadour
