= Gloria (Umberto Tozzi song) =

1979 single by Umberto Tozzi

- Picture sleeve (including the Italian release)

Single by Umberto Tozzi

from the album Gloria
- B-side: "Aria di lei"
- Released: June 1979
- Studio: Union Studios, Munich
- Genre: Italo disco; Eurodisco
- Length: 4:25
- Label: CGD; CBS
- Songwriters: Umberto Tozzi; Giancarlo Bigazzi; Jonathan King (English translation)
- Producer: Umberto Tozzi

Umberto Tozzi singles chronology
"Qualcosa qualcuno" (1979)	"Gloria" (1979)	"Stella stai" (1980)

Music videos
- Gloria on YouTube by Umberto Tozzi (official audio). Warner Music Italy (5:05 minutes)
- Gloria on YouTube by Umberto Tozzi, in English. 12-inch single (stereo). Vanguard Records (7:11 minutes)

"Gloria" (Italian pronunciation: [ˈɡlɔːrja]) is a 1979 song written and composed in Italian by Umberto Tozzi and Giancarlo Bigazzi, and first translated to English by Jonathan King. A 1982 cover version by American singer Laura Branigan, with different English lyrics, peaked at number two on the US Billboard Hot 100 and has been certified platinum by the Recording Industry Association of America (RIAA).

== Umberto Tozzi version ==
=== Background ===
Umberto Tozzi first recorded "Gloria" in 1979, using the word "Gloria" and the fragment of a melody sung with that word from Ludwig van Beethoven's setting of the Latin Mass, Missa solemnis. The love song stayed four weeks at number one in both Switzerland and—in a translated version—Spain. That same year, Tozzi's "Gloria" reached number four in Austria, number five in Belgium, number eight in West Germany and number 29 in the Netherlands.

In 2011, the song was brought up to date with a set of new house mixes by Alex Gaudino and Jason Rooney. The music video stars Umberto and Natasha Tozzi.

Tozzi's original version of "Gloria" appeared on the respective soundtracks to the 2013 films The Wolf of Wall Street and Gloria. It was also played during the Parade of Nations in the 2019 Summer Universiade Opening Ceremony as Italy, the host nation of the Universiade at the time, entered the stage.

=== Track listings ===
7-inch single
No.	Title	Length
1.	"Gloria"	4:25
2.	"Aria di lei"	4:10

12-inch single
No.	Title	Length
1.	"Gloria" (12-inch disco mix)	7:05
2.	"Mama"	5:07

12-inch single (UK)
No.	Title	Length
1.	"Gloria" (English version)	6:30
2.	"Gloria" (Italian version)	4:25
3.	"Aria di lei"	4:10

CD single – 2001 version
No.	Title	Length
1.	"Gloria" (2001 version)	4:57
2.	"Gloria" (Remixland radio edit)	4:25
3.	"Gloria" (Remixland extended)	5:39
4.	"Gloria" (La Fabrique Du Sons dub remix)	6:03
5.	"Gloria" (Original version)	4:55

Digital download – 2011 remixes
No.	Title	Length
1.	"Gloria 2011" (Club edit)	4:09
2.	"Gloria 2011" (Sorrentino & Zara Italian radio mix)	4:25
3.	"Gloria 2011" (Sorrentino & Zara English radio mix)	4:25
4.	"Gloria 2011" (Club mix)	7:13
5.	"Gloria 2011" (Sorrentino & Zara Italian extended mix)	6:12
6.	"Gloria 2011" (Sorrentino & Zara English extended mix)	6:27

=== Personnel ===
- Umberto Tozzi – vocals, chorus
- Greg Mathieson – conductor, piano, keyboards
- Barry Morgan – drums
- Mats Björklund – guitar
- Les Hurdle – bass
- Munich Philharmonic – strings
- Euro Cristiani – chorus

=== Charts ===
==== Weekly charts ====
Weekly chart performance for "Gloria"
Chart (1979–1980)	Peak position
Australia (Kent Music Report) English version	46
Austria (Ö3 Austria Top 40)	4
Belgium (Ultratop 50 Flanders)	5
Italy (Musica e dischi)	2
Netherlands (Dutch Top 40)	21
Netherlands (Single Top 100)	29
Portugal (Música & Som)	3
South Africa (Springbok Radio) English version	7
Spain (AFYVE) Spanish version	1
Switzerland (Schweizer Hitparade)	1
West Germany (GfK)	8

==== Year-end charts ====
Annual chart rankings for "Gloria"
Chart (1979)	Position
Austria (Ö3 Austria Top 40)	17
Belgium (Ultratop 50 Flanders)	40
Italy (Musica e dischi)	14
Switzerland (Schweizer Hitparade)	4
West Germany (Official German Charts)	36

=== Certifications ===
Region	Certification	Certified units/sales
Italy (FIMI) sales since 2009	Gold	25,000^{‡}
Spain (Promusicae)	Gold	25,000^{^}
^{^} Shipments figures based on certification alone.^{‡} Sales+streaming figures based on certification alone.

== Jonathan King version ==
The first English rendering of the song was recorded by its original English-language lyricist Jonathan King in November 1979, which reached number 65 on the UK Singles Chart. Tozzi later recorded and performed King's translated version of "Gloria".

=== Lyrical content ===
In Jonathan King's English lyrics, Tozzi, who takes the role of the song's main character, tells that he is dreaming about an imaginary woman named Gloria. He describes his living days as misery, but when he dreams of Gloria, he says his nights are liberty. The protagonist describes Gloria as his queen imagination that comes from his fascination, not from any kind of fantasy. He further elaborates that he has always set Gloria free from him, just as he has set freedom from reality. He then tells that his friends think he is crazy, but he argues his point that they have never met Gloria (so far, he has no proof of her actual existence); but one day when he finds her, he says his friends will talk about Gloria's beauty and her loyalty. To accomplish the goal of realizing his dreams despite everyone else's protests, the protagonist sets all his life to search for Gloria until he meets her in reality, and then promises to hold her, to touch her, and to keep her because he loves Gloria.

== Laura Branigan version ==
"Gloria"
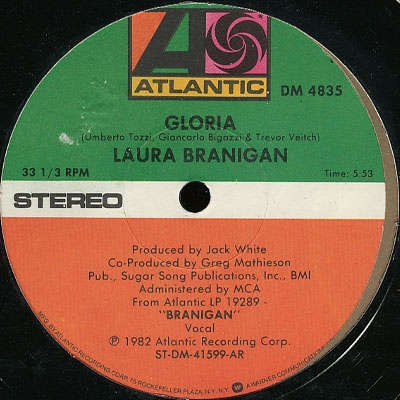
- Side A of the US 12-inch vinyl release, housed in a generic Atlantic sleeve instead of a picture sleeve

Single by Laura Branigan

from the album Branigan
- B-side: "Living a Lie" (US); "I Wish We Could Be Alone" (UK)
- Released: June 1982
- Recorded: 1981–1982
- Studio: Rusk Sound (Hollywood, California)
- Genre: Eurodisco; post-disco; synth-rock; pop rock
- Length: 4:51 (album and single version); 3:50 (radio and video edit); 5:53 (12-inch mix)
- Label: Atlantic
- Songwriters: Umberto Tozzi; Giancarlo Bigazzi; Trevor Veitch
- Producer: Jack White

Laura Branigan singles chronology
"All Night with Me" (1982)	"Gloria" (1982)	"Solitaire" (1983)

Alternative picture sleeve
- UK version of the international picture sleeve (zoomed-in from the cover art of the parent album)

Music video
- "Gloria" on YouTube by Laura Branigan (official music video). Rhino Entertainment Company (3:51 minutes)

=== Background ===
Atlantic Records' managing director Doug Morris suggested that Laura Branigan work with producer Jack White, who suggested that she record an English version of Tozzi's hit "Gloria". Branigan was not impressed with the song until songwriter Trevor Veitch wrote a new English lyric for it.

Branigan told People magazine that she and her producers had at first attempted an English version of Tozzi's "Gloria" in the romantic mode of the original (changing the title to "Mario"), but that it seemed ineffective. Ultimately, Branigan recorded an English re-invention of "Gloria" as a character study of, in her words, "a girl that's running too fast for her own steps".

In 2003, Branigan characterized "Gloria" as her "signature song". She added, "I always get the same reaction wherever I go, and whenever I perform it ... I have to end every show with that song, and people just go crazy."

=== Commercial performance ===
The most successful version of "Gloria" was featured on the 1982 album Branigan, the first album released by Laura Branigan. Although another track, "All Night with Me", was chosen as the album's lead single, Branigan performed "Gloria" during her promotional television appearances at the time of the album's release. "Gloria" was chosen as the album's second single in June 1982, first becoming a disco favorite and gradually accruing radio support to enter the pop charts in July. The single reached number two on the Billboard Hot 100 on 27 November 1982, behind Lionel Richie's "Truly", and remained there the following two weeks, through 11 December—when Richie had been supplanted by Toni Basil's "Mickey".

"Gloria" earned Branigan a nomination for the Best Pop Vocal Performance Female Grammy Award for the year 1982. The song remained in the Top 40 for 22 weeks, and its total Hot 100 residency of 36 weeks established a new record for a single by a solo female act. The song also topped Cash Box magazine's chart. Certified platinum for sales of over two million in the United States alone, "Gloria" was also an international success, most notably in Australia where it held the top position for seven consecutive weeks, from 7 February to 21 March 1983. "Gloria" also reached number one in Canada, number four in Ireland, number six in New Zealand and the United Kingdom, and number nine in South Africa.

=== Notable inclusions ===
==== Use by the St. Louis Blues ====
The National Hockey League's (NHL) St. Louis Blues began using Branigan's cover version of "Gloria" as its unofficial victory song when they went on a franchise-record 11-game winning streak during the 2018–19 season; on January 6, a couple of Blues teammates were at Jack's NYB in South Philadelphia, watching the Philadelphia Eagles at Chicago Bears NFC Wild Card Round game now known as the "Double Doink" for the Eagles' block of a Bears' potential game winning field goal attempt. According to defenceman Joel Edmundson, "this one guy looked at the DJ and said, 'Keep playing "Gloria"!' so they kept playing it. Everyone would get up and start singing and dancing. We just sat back and watched it happen. Right there we decided we should play the song after our wins." The following day, goaltender Jordan Binnington made his first start for the Blues that season and won the game with a shutout. The song was played at Enterprise Center every time the Blues won a game in the season, leading to "Play Gloria!" becoming both a meme and victory chant for Blues fans. "Gloria" reappeared on the iTunes singles chart thanks to the trend, reaching number three after the Blues won the Stanley Cup. "Gloria" also re-entered the Billboard charts in the wake of the Blues' championship, landing at number 46 on the Digital Song Sales chart for the week of 22 June 2019. In 2026, Billboard ranked it number 37 in their list of "The Biggest No. 2 Hot 100 Hits of All Time", noting that the song had peaked at number two, just behind Lionel Richie's "Truly" and Toni Basil's "Mickey".

=== Track listings ===
7-inch single
No.	Title	Length
1.	"Gloria"	4:50
2.	"Living a Lie"	3:41

12-inch single
No.	Title	Length
1.	"Gloria" (Extended version)	5:53
2.	"Living a Lie"	3:41

7-inch single (UK)
No.	Title	Length
1.	"Gloria"	4:50
2.	"I Wish We Could Be Alone"	3:18

7-inch single (Italy)
No.	Title	Length
1.	"Gloria"	4:50
2.	"All Night with Me"	3:52

CD single – The Remixes
No.	Title	Length
1.	"Gloria '99" (DJ-C radio edit)	3:30
2.	"Gloria '99" (DJ-C extended mix)	4:32
3.	"Gloria '99" (Tinka's house mix)	6:29
4.	"Gloria '99" (Tinka's dub mix)	6:31

CD single – 2004 Mixes
No.	Title	Length
1.	"Gloria 2004" (Prodygee & Davis radio mix)	3:23
2.	"Gloria 2004" (alternative radio version)	3:38
3.	"Gloria 2004" (S.A.D. radio mix)	4:09
4.	"Gloria 2004" (Prodygee & Davis remix)	6:16
5.	"Gloria 2004" (S.A.D. club mix)	6:59
6.	"Gloria 2004" (Prodygee & Davis club mix)	6:01

12-inch single – 2004 Mixes
No.	Title	Length
1.	"Gloria 2004" (Discotronix remix)	7:01
2.	"Gloria 2004" (Prodygee & Davis remix)	6:16
3.	"Gloria 2004" (S.A.D. club mix)	6:59
4.	"Gloria 2004" (Prodygee & Davis club mix)	6:01

=== Personnel ===
- Laura Branigan – vocals
- Michael Boddicker – synthesizer
- Joe Chemay – background vocals
- Bob Glaub – bass guitar
- Jim Haas – background vocals
- Jon Joyce – background vocals
- Michael Landau – guitar
- Greg Mathieson – synthesizer, keyboards
- Lisa Sarna – background vocals
- Stephanie Spruill – background vocals
- Julia Tillman Waters – background vocals
- Carlos Vega – drums
- Trevor Veitch – guitar
- Maxine Willard Waters – background vocals

=== Charts ===
==== Weekly charts ====
Chart (1982–1983)	Peak position
Australia (Kent Music Report)	1
Belgium (Ultratop 50 Flanders)	32
Canada Top Singles (RPM)	1
Canada Adult Contemporary (RPM)	2
Finland (Suomen virallinen lista)	22
Ireland (IRMA)	4
Israel (Israeli Singles Chart)	18
New Zealand (Recorded Music NZ)	6
South Africa (Springbok Radio)	9
UK Singles (Official Charts)	6
US Billboard Hot 100	2
US Adult Contemporary (Billboard)	28
US Dance Club Songs (Billboard)	4
US Cash Box Top 100	1
Luxembourg (Radio Luxembourg)	3
Quebec (ADISQ)	2

==== Year-end charts ====
Chart (1982)	Position
Canada Top Singles (RPM)	14
US Billboard Hot 100	75
US Dance Club Songs (Billboard)	35
US Cash Box Top 100	26

Chart (1983)	Position
Australia (Kent Music Report)	3
Canada Top Singles (RPM)	54
New Zealand (Recorded Music NZ)	49
US Billboard Hot 100	56

==== All-time charts ====
Chart (1958–2018)	Position
US Billboard Hot 100	386

=== Certifications ===
Region	Certification	Certified units/sales
Canada (Music Canada)	Platinum	100,000^{^}
New Zealand (RMNZ)	Platinum	30,000^{‡}
United Kingdom (BPI)	Gold	400,000^{‡}
United States (RIAA)	Platinum	1,000,000^{^}
^{^} Shipments figures based on certification alone.^{‡} Sales+streaming figures based on certification alone.

=== Gloria 2004 ===
"Gloria 2004"

Single by Laura Branigan
- Released: 2004
- Length: 3:50
- Label: Dance Street
- Songwriters: Umberto Tozzi; Giancarlo Bigazzi; Trevor Veitch

Laura Branigan singles chronology
"Self Control 2004" (2003)	"Gloria 2004" (2004)	"The Winner Takes It All" (2005)

Branigan's "Gloria" was released for an "oldies series" release in the US. In the UK, a similar release paired the song with her earlier single, "Self Control". This marks her last recording before her death in 2004.

== Other versions and inclusions ==
=== Early years ===
A Czech rendition of "Gloria", titled "Dívka Gloria", was a local success for Vítězslav Vávra in 1980; as well as for the Estonian rendering of "Gloria" recorded by Mait Maltis in the same year. A Filipino rendition recorded by Filipino-Japanese singing group Nailclippers also, in the same year. . In 1982, Sheila released a French language version with lyrics by Claude Carrère and Jean Schmitt; the single, "Glori, Gloria" rose to number 8 in France on 15 January 1983. Also in 1982, Lena Valaitis had a single release of "Gloria" with new German lyrics written by Michael Kunze, and production by Jack White. In 1983, Carola Häggkvist recorded a Swedish rendering of "Gloria"—with lyrics by Ingela Forsman—for her album Främling, and Mona Carita recorded a Finnish version of the song for her album Mikä Fiilis!

"Gloria" has been used internationally in television commercials for products as diverse as beer and flour; while another version of the song, amended into an advertising jingle with lyrics to suit the product, and soundalike vocalist to Branigan, was used in an Australian TV commercial for the 1984 Mitsubishi Cordia.

Prior to the commercial success of Branigan's version in the United Kingdom, British singer Elkie Brooks recorded her version of "Gloria", which was unreleased prior to inclusion in the 1986 album The Very Best of Elkie Brooks. Australian singer Julie Anthony also recorded "Gloria" for her 1983 covers album What a Feeling.

=== Later years ===
Debbie Reynolds sings a snippet of "Gloria" in the "Lows in the Mid-Eighties" episode of the NBC sitcom Will & Grace (broadcast on 23 November 2000), performing the song as the character "Bobbi Adler" in a sequence set in 1985. Australian Young Divas included "Gloria" on their self-titled album in 2006.

David Civera recorded a Spanish rendering of "Gloria" for his album A ritmo de clasicos in 2011, the same year that Sergio Dalma recorded another Spanish version of "Gloria" on his album Via Dalma II; the album lasted five weeks at number 1 in Spain, and earned quadruple-platinum status. Airing in December 2011, Sergio Dalma also performed the song on an RTVE special called Via Dalma, where Tozzi was also among the guests. In 2012, Mexican singer Gloria Trevi recorded a version of the song and released it as the first single for her eponymous, Gloria Live album.

On 12 June 2019, while in St. Louis, Phish covered the song following the St. Louis Blues' win over the Boston Bruins in the 2019 Stanley Cup Finals. In 2021 Angel Olsen released a cover of the song on her EP Aisles.

Mona Carita's cover version appears on the Kaleidoscope FM radio station in the 2026 video game Grand Theft Auto VI.

== See also ==
- Music of Italy
