= The Section Quartet =

American string quartet

- Origin: Los Angeles, California, U.S.
- Genres: Classical; Pop; Rock
- Years active: 1998–present
- Labels: Viamin, Decca
- Members: Eric Gorfain; Daphne Chen; Leah Katz; Richard Dodd
- Website: thesectionquartet.com

The Section Quartet is a string quartet founded by Eric Gorfain that performs cover versions of rock songs.

== History ==
Eric Gorfain founded the quartet after working for the 1996 tour of Robert Plant and Jimmy Page. He said the quartet fulfilled his desire to play lead guitar in a rock band. The debut album, No Electricity Required (2004), contained Gorfain's arrangement of "Dazed and Confused" by Led Zeppelin in addition to cover versions of songs by Coldplay, Kiss, Iron Maiden, and Queens of the Stone Age.

The Section Quartet consists of Gorfain on violin, Daphne Chen on violin, Richard Dodd on cello, and Leah Katz on viola. They have performed on soundtracks and pop music albums, such as Stripped (RCA, 2002) by Christina Aguilera. Their performance on "Beautiful" impressed the songwriter, Linda Perry. She produced the quartet's album Fuzzbox (2007) for Decca Records, which reached number 14 on the Billboard Classical Crossover Chart.

== Discography ==
- No Electricity Required (2004)
- Lizards Like Us (2006)
- Fuzzbox (Decca, 2007)

=== As guest ===
- 1993: The Nightmare Before Christmas, Danny Elfman
- 2003: The Nurse Who Loved Me, A Perfect Circle
- 2004: A Boot and a Shoe, Sam Phillips
- 2004: Into the Now, Tesla
- 2007: Graduation, Kanye West
- 2007: Reba: Duets, Reba McEntire
- 2007: Smokey Rolls Down Thunder Canyon, Devendra Banhart
- 2007: Southland Tales
- 2007: Strange Weirdos, Loudon Wainwright III
- 2008: Keeps Gettin' Better: A Decade of Hits, Christina Aguilera
- 2008: Recovery, Loudon Wainwright III
- 2010: Bionic, Christina Aguilera
- 2010: Burlesque
- 2014: Goddess, Banks
- 2015: Coming Forth by Day, Cassandra Wilson
- 2016: The Altar, Banks
- 2017: Revival, Eminem
- 2017: Villains, Queens of the Stone Age
