= Laura Branigan discography =

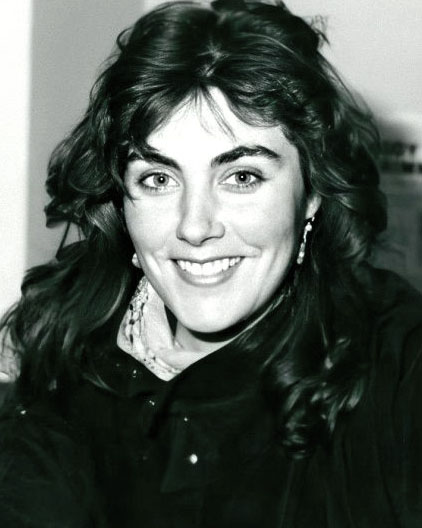
- Branigan c. 1982
- Studio albums: 7
- Extended plays: 1
- Compilation albums: 6
- Singles: 32
- Video albums: 3
- Music videos: 14
- Other contributions: 22

The discography of American singer Laura Branigan consists of seven studio albums, six compilation albums, 32 singles, four promotional singles, three video albums, and 14 music videos.

== Albums ==
=== Studio albums ===
Title	Album details	Peak chart positions											Certifications
Title	Album details	US	AUS	AUT	CAN	GER	NLD	NOR	NZ	SWE	SWI	UK	Certifications
Branigan	Released: March 1982; Label: Atlantic; Formats: CD, cassette, LP	34	50	—	23	—	—	—	—	—	—	—	RIAA: Gold; ARIA: Gold; MC: Gold
Branigan 2	Released: March 1983; Label: Atlantic; Formats: CD, cassette, LP	29	30	—	46	—	—	—	11	—	—	—	RIAA: Gold
Self Control	Released: April 1984; Label: Atlantic; Formats: CD, cassette, LP	23	29	16	12	5	48	3	38	5	2	16	RIAA: Platinum; BPI: Silver; BVMI: Gold; MC: Platinum
Hold Me	Released: July 1985; Label: Atlantic; Formats: CD, cassette, LP	71	37	—	43	31	—	12	—	7	10	64	
Touch	Released: July 7, 1987; Label: Atlantic; Formats: CD, cassette, LP	87	68	—	94	—	—	—	—	20	24	—	
Laura Branigan	Released: March 21, 1990; Label: Atlantic; Formats: CD, cassette, LP	133	143	—	—	—	86	—	—	—	—	—	
Over My Heart	Released: August 17, 1993; Label: Atlantic; Formats: CD, cassette	—	151	—	—	—	—	—	—	—	—	—	
"—" denotes albums that did not chart or were not released

=== Live albums ===
Title	Album details
Laura Branigan Live!	Released: May 15, 2023; Label: Kian Records; Formats: 2×CD, 3×LP, digital; Recorded in July 1990

=== Compilation albums ===
Title	Album details	Peak chart positions			Certifications
Title	Album details	AUS	FIN	DEN	Certifications
The Best of Laura Branigan	Released: 1988; Label: Atlantic; Formats: CD, cassette, LP	—	—	—	
The Very Best of Laura Branigan	Released: November 16, 1992; Label: Atlantic; Formats: CD, cassette, LP	—	2	3	IFPI FIN: Gold
The Best of Branigan	Released: June 6, 1995; Label: Atlantic; Formats: CD, cassette	—	—	—	
The Essentials	Released: August 20, 2002; Label: Atlantic; Formats: CD, cassette	—	—	—	
The Platinum Collection	Released: July 24, 2006; Label: Rhino; Formats: CD	—	—	—	
Shine On: The Ultimate Collection	Released: June 15, 2010; Label: Gallo; Formats: CD, DVD	—	—	—	
"—" denotes albums that did not chart or were not released

=== Box sets ===
Title	Album details
The Complete Atlantic Albums	Released: September 20, 2019; Label: X5; Formats: Digital download

== Extended plays ==
Title	Album details
Rhino Hi-Five: Laura Branigan	Released: September 20, 2005; Label: Rhino; Formats: Digital download

== Singles ==
Year	Single	Peak chart positions											Certifications	Album
Year	Single	US	US AC	AUS	AUT	CAN	FIN	FRA	GER	IRE	NZ	UK	Certifications	Album
1980	"Fool's Affair"/"When"	—	—	—	—	—	—	—	—	—	—	—		Non-album singles
1981	"Looking Out for Number One"	—	—	—	—	—	—	—	—	—	—	—		Non-album singles
1982	"All Night with Me"	69	—	—	—	—	—	—	—	—	—	—		Branigan
1982	"Gloria"	2	28	1	—	1	22	—	—	4	6	6	RIAA: Platinum; ARIA: Platinum; BPI: Gold; MC: Platinum; RMNZ: Platinum	Branigan
1983	"Solitaire"	7	—	5	—	8	—	—	—	—	12	—		Branigan 2
1983	"How Am I Supposed to Live Without You"	12	1	46	—	—	—	—	—	—	—	—		Branigan 2
1983	"Deep in the Dark" (Note: Not released in the U.S.)	—	—	—	—	—	—	—	—	—	—	—		Branigan 2
1984	"Self Control"	4	5	3	1	1	1	1	1	2	26	5	BPI: Gold; BVMI: Gold; RMNZ: Gold; SNEP: Gold	Self Control
1984	"The Lucky One"	20	13	48	—	53	—	27	33	29	—	56		Self Control
1984	"Ti Amo"	55	22	2	—	5	18	—	—	—	49	100		Self Control
1984	"Satisfaction"	—	—	—	—	—	29	—	—	—	—	—		Self Control
1984	"With Every Beat of My Heart" (Note: Only released in Germany as a 7" single.)	—	—	—	—	—	—	—	—	—	—	—		Self Control
1985	"Spanish Eddie"	40	29	24	8	38	—	73	36	—	—	87		Hold Me
1985	"Hold Me"	82	—	—	—	—	—	—	—	—	—	—		Hold Me
1985	"Maybe Tonight"	—	—	—	—	—	—	—	—	—	—	134		Hold Me
1986	"I Found Someone"	90	25	—	—	—	—	—	—	—	—	—		Hold Me
1987	"Shattered Glass"	48	27	60	—	—	—	—	43	—	—	78		Touch
1987	"Power of Love"	26	19	—	—	—	—	—	—	—	—	—		Touch
1987	"Spirit of Love" (Note: Only released in Europe as 7" and 12" singles.)	—	—	—	—	—	—	—	—	—	—	—		Touch
1988	"Cry Wolf"	—	—	98	—	—	—	—	—	—	—	—		Touch
1988	"Come into My Life" (Laura Branigan and Joe Esposito)	—	—	—	—	—	—	—	—	—	—	—		Coming to America
1989	"Heart of Me" (Note: Only released in France as 7", 12" and CD singles from Cerrone's album Way In.) (Cerrone and Laura Branigan)	—	—	—	—	—	—	—	—	—	—	—		Way In
1990	"Moonlight on Water"	59	—	159	—	83	29	—	—	—	—	—		Laura Branigan
1990	"Never in a Million Years"	—	22	—	—	—	—	—	—	—	—	—		Laura Branigan
1990	"Turn the Beat Around" (Note: Only released in U.S. as 12" single.)	—	—	—	—	—	—	—	—	—	—	—		Laura Branigan
1991	"Tokio" (Note: Only released in Japan as 3" CD single.)	—	—	—	—	—	—	—	—	—	—	—		The Best of Laura Branigan
1993	"It's Been Hard Enough Getting Over You"	—	—	—	—	—	—	—	—	—	—	—		Over My Heart
1994	"How Can I Help You Say Goodbye"	—	—	—	—	—	—	—	—	—	—	—		Over My Heart
1995	"Dim All the Lights"	—	—	—	—	—	—	—	—	—	—	—		The Best of Branigan
1995	"I Believe" (Note: Only released in Germany as a CD maxi single from the Baywatch soundtrack album.) (David Hasselhoff and Laura Branigan)	—	—	—	—	—	—	—	—	—	—	—		Baywatch
"—" denotes singles that did not chart or were not released

=== Promotional singles ===
Year	Single	Album
1978	"Memories" (Note: Released as a promo 7" single as the theme to the TV special Calloway's Climb.)	Calloway's Climb
1980	"Tell Him"	Non-album single
1993	"Didn't We Almost Win It All"	Over My Heart
1993	"Love Your Girl" (Note: Released as a promo 12" remix single.)	Over My Heart

== Videography ==
=== Video albums ===
Title	Album details	Notes
Laura Branigan	Released: April 1984; Label: RCA; Format: VHS, Laserdisc	Live concert as part of the 1984 Self Control Tour.; Filmed at Caesars Tahoe, Nevada.
Laura Branigan in Concert	Released: July 1990; Label: SRO Concerts; Format: VHS, Laserdisc	Live concert as part of the 1990 Laura Branigan Tour.; Filmed in Atlantic City, New Jersey.
Shine On: The Ultimate Collection	Released: June 15, 2010; Label: Gallo; Format: CD, DVD	Greatest hits CD and a collection of music videos on DVD.

=== Music videos ===
Year	Song	Notes
1980	"Fool's Affair"	Branigan's first music video, recorded for her unreleased album Silver Dreams.
1982	"Gloria"	
1983	"Solitaire"	
1984	"Self Control"	Video nominated for an American Music award in 1985.
1984	"The Lucky One"	Song won the coveted Grand Prix award at the 1984 Tokyo Music Festival.
1985	"Spanish Eddie"	The storyline in this video is a re-telling of West Side Story.
1985	"Maybe Tonight"	
1987	"Shattered Glass"	
1987	"Cry Wolf"	
1988	"Your Love"	Released to promote the film Salsa.
1989	"Heart of Me" (with Cerrone)	
1990	"Moonlight on Water"	
1993	"Didn't We Almost Win It All"	Video features her brother Billy Branigan, who is also on backing vocals.
1995	"Dim All the Lights"	Branigan's last music video.

== Soundtracks and other contributions ==
Year	Song	Film/soundtrack/album
1978	"Memories"	Calloway's Climb (TV film soundtrack)
1980	"I Love the Nightlife"	Gut Gestimmt (TV variety show soundtrack)
1980	"The Lady I Am"	Gut Gestimmt (TV variety show soundtrack)
1983	"Imagination"	Flashdance (film soundtrack)
1983	"Love is Forever"	Love is Forever (TV movie soundtrack)
1983	"Find Me"	Touched (film soundtrack)
1984	"Hot Night"	Ghostbusters (film soundtrack)
1984	"Sharpshooter"	Body Rock (film soundtrack)
1985	"Hollywood Wives"	Hollywood Wives (TV mini-series soundtrack)
1986	"One Day"	Violets Are Blue (film soundtrack)
1986	"If I Were a River"	Disney's Living Seas (TV special soundtrack)
1987	"Sin Hablar" (with Luis Miguel)	Soy Como Quiero Ser (guest vocals)
1988	"Helpless"	Backstage (film soundtrack)
1988	"So Lost Without Your Love"	Backstage (film soundtrack)
1988	"Lonely Nights"	Backstage (film soundtrack)
1988	"Come into My Life" (with Joe Esposito)	Coming to America (film soundtrack)
1988	"Believe in Me"	B-side to "Come into My Life"
1988	"Your Love"	Salsa (film soundtrack)
1989	"Heart of Me" (with Cerrone)	Way In (guest vocals)
1991	"Hark! The Herald Angels Sing"	The Christmas Album: A Gift of Hope (charity album)
1993	"A Much, Much Greater Love"	Women in Love (from an unreleased solo single, recorded in 1978)
2002	"Time Strangers"	Sincerely... Mariya Takeuchi Songbook (guest vocals)
2003	"More Than Just a Memory"	Mayo Okamoto Songbook: Once in a Lifetime (guest vocals)

== See also ==
- List of songs recorded by Laura Branigan
