= List of songs recorded by Laura Branigan =

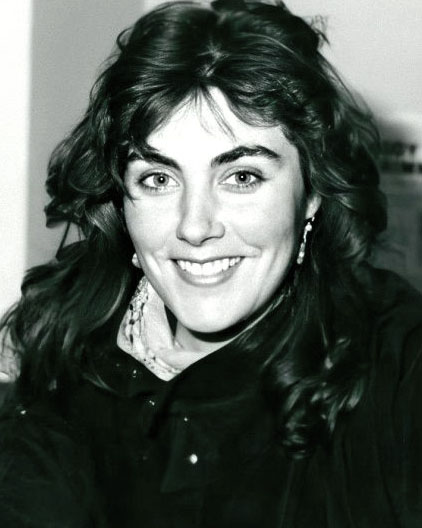
Branigan c. 1982

This is a list of songs recorded by American singer and songwriter Laura Branigan. Between 1981 and 1993, Branigan recorded songs for seven studio albums, as well as for several soundtrack releases and various artist albums. Prior to the final release of her debut album, Branigan, in 1982, many songs from early recording sessions for the album were shelved. While some were released as promotional singles, and others later released as b-sides or as bonus tracks on reissues, most of the tracks remain unreleased. In addition, Branigan also recorded two new tracks for The Best of Branigan in 1995, her first North American greatest hits album. These marked her final recordings with long-time label Atlantic Records while she took an extended hiatus from the music industry to care for her husband, who was diagnosed with colon cancer, and ultimately to mourn his death. In the late 1990s and up until her own death in 2004, Branigan recorded a handful of songs for compilations as well as for a proposed comeback album. The project was never completed however, and none of these songs have been officially released.

== Songs ==
Key
†	Indicates single release
‡	Indicates promotional single release
§	Indicates song written by Branigan

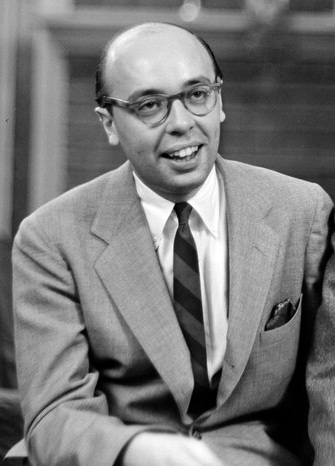
Ahmet Ertegun, co-founder and president of Atlantic Records, signed Branigan in 1979 and co-produced a selection of her early singles including "Looking Out for Number One".

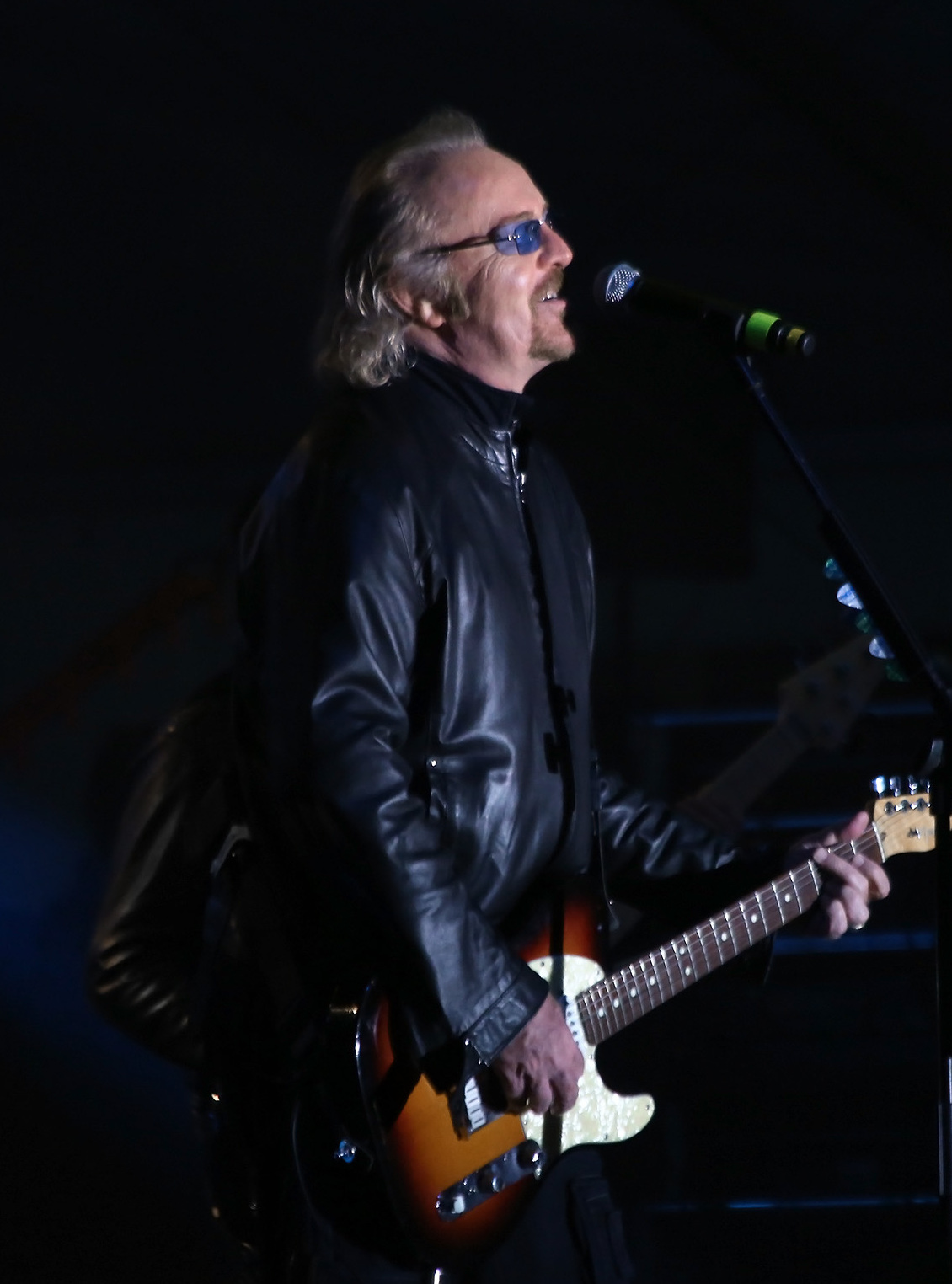
Italian singer-songwriter Umberto Tozzi became associated with Branigan after the success of her English-language cover of "Gloria". Branigan would go on to record two further Tozzi compositions, including the single "Ti amo" which they later performed live together.

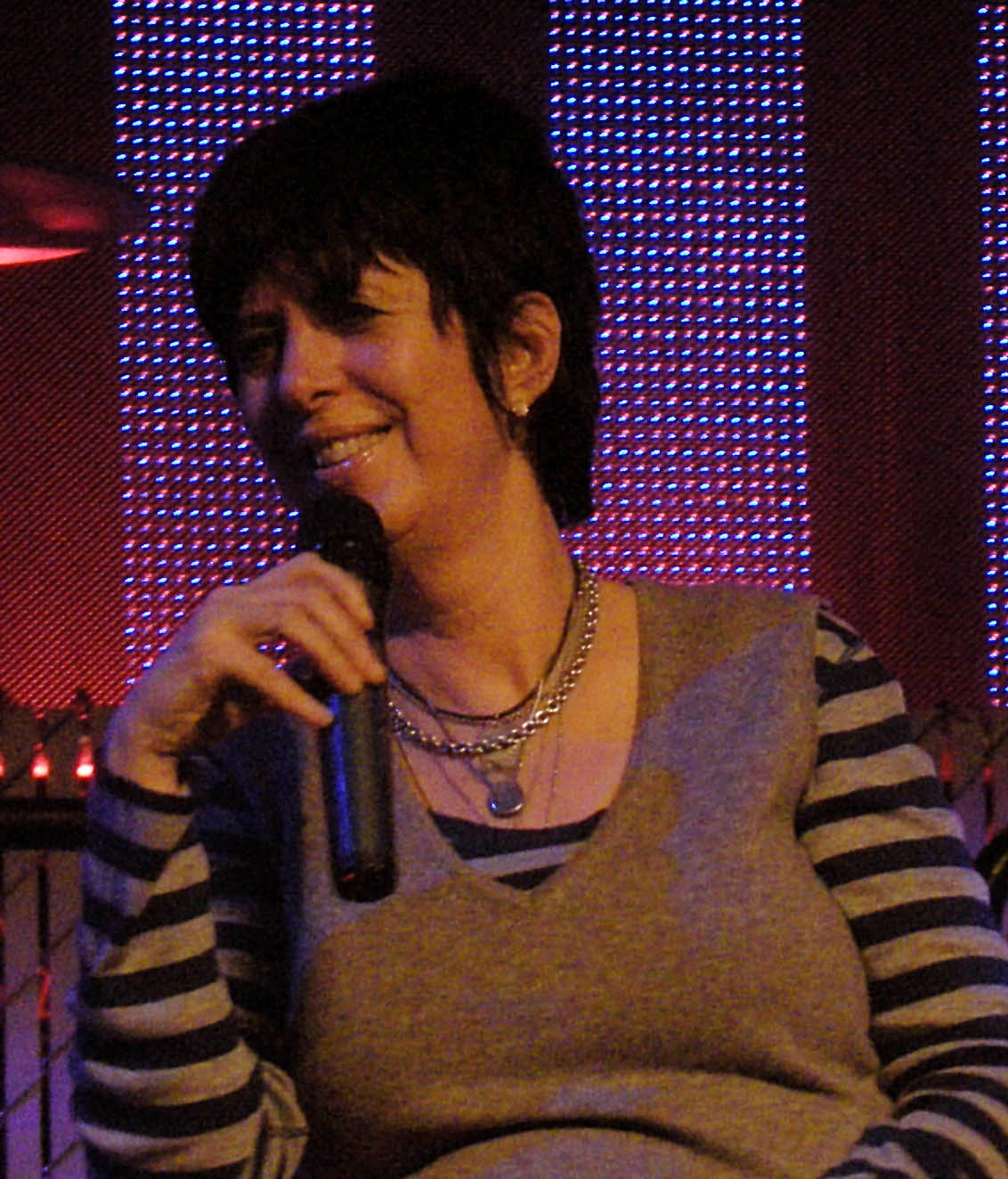
Songwriter Diane Warren co-wrote several songs for Branigan's first three albums, including the single "Solitaire" which became Warren's first hit.

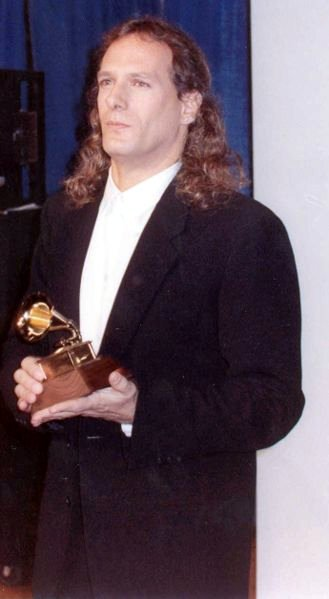
Michael Bolton co-wrote "How Am I Supposed to Live Without You", "I Found Someone" and "It's Been Hard Enough Getting Over You", all released as singles by Branigan.

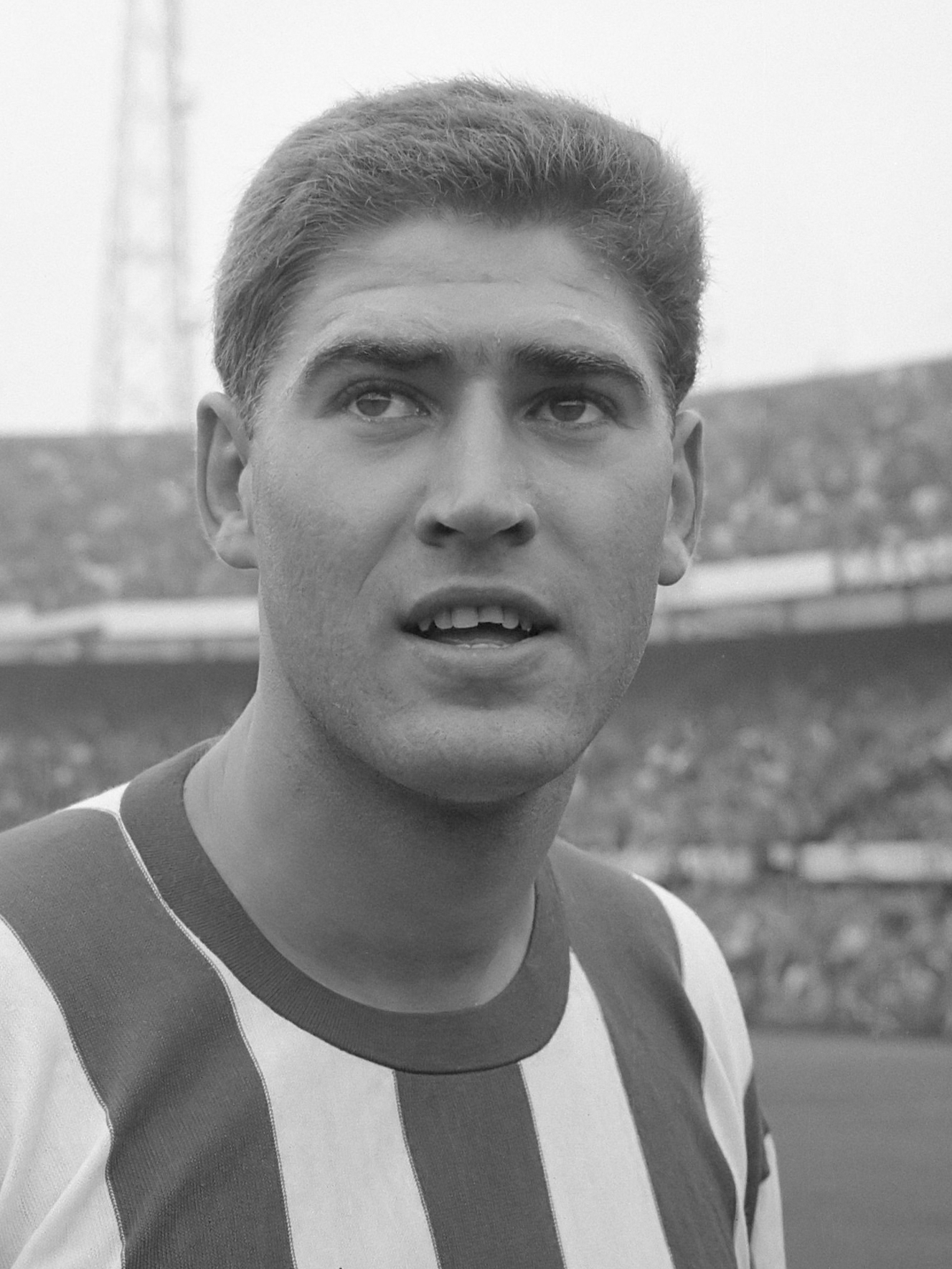
Jack White was Branigan's main producer from 1982–85 and also co-wrote several songs for 1985's Hold Me.

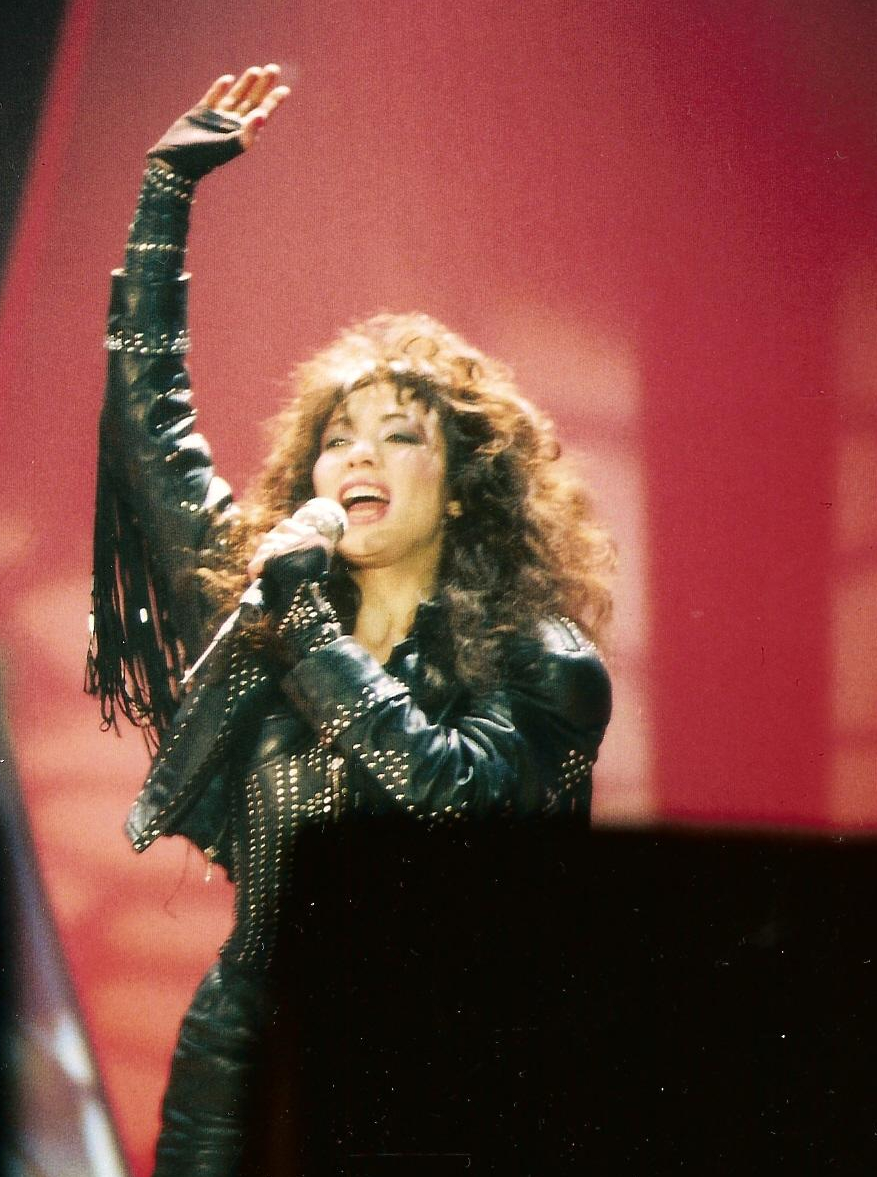
Jennifer Rush co-wrote, and originally recorded, "Power of Love" which Branigan released as a single in 1987.

Title	Artist(s)	Writer(s)	Album	Year	Ref.
"All Night with Me" †	Laura Branigan	Chris Montan	Branigan	1982	
"All Time High"	Laura Branigan	John Barry; Tim Rice	Unreleased	1983	
"Angels Calling"	Laura Branigan	Rosetta Stone; Jan Mullaney	Touch	1987	
"Artist"	Meadow (with Branigan on lead vocals)	Chris Van Cleave	The Friend Ship	1973	
"Ashes in the Wind"	Laura Branigan	Joan Jett; Desmond Child	Unreleased	late 1990s	
"Bad Attitude"	Laura Branigan	Paul Bliss; Steve Kipner	Laura Branigan	1990	
"Believe in Me"	Laura Branigan	Brian BecVar	B-side to "Come into My Life"	1988	
"The Best Was Yet to Come"	Laura Branigan	Bryan Adams; Jim Vallance	Laura Branigan	1990	
"Breaking Out"	Laura Branigan	Diane Warren; The Doctor	Self Control	1984	
"Cane and Able" ‡	Meadow (with Branigan on backing vocals)	Walker Daniels; Chris Van Cleave	The Friend Ship	1973	
"Cellos & Violins"	Laura Branigan	Alan Roy Scott; Laura Branigan § Rick Cowling	Unreleased	late 1990s	
"The Challenge"	Laura Branigan	Uncredited	Unreleased	2004	
"Close Enough"	Laura Branigan	Robbie Buchanan; John Lang	Branigan 2	1983	
"Come into My Life" †	Laura Branigan and Joe Esposito	Paul Chiten; Pamela Philips-Oland	Coming to America (Soundtrack album)	1988	
"Completely"	Meadow (with Branigan on backing vocals)	Chris Van Cleave	The Friend Ship	1973	
"Cry Wolf" †	Laura Branigan	Jude Johnstone	Touch	1987	
"Deep in the Dark" †	Laura Branigan	Johann Hölzel; Robert Ponger; Bill Bowersock	Branigan 2	1983	
"Didn't We Almost Win It All" ‡	Laura Branigan	Laura Branigan § Brian BecVar	Over My Heart	1993	
"Dim All the Lights" †	Laura Branigan	Donna Summer	The Best of Branigan	1995	
"Do I Have to Dance All Night" (live) †	Leonard Cohen (with Branigan on backing vocals)	Leonard Cohen	Single only	1976	
"Don't Close Your Eyes Tonight"	Laura Branigan	Unknown	Unreleased	1981	
"Don't Cry for Me Argentina" (live)	Laura Branigan	Andrew Lloyd Webber; Tim Rice	Laura Branigan in Concert	1991	
"Don't Show Your Love"	Laura Branigan	Lee Holdridge; Carol Connors	Branigan 2	1983	
"Down Like a Rock"	Laura Branigan	Randy VanWarmer	Branigan	1982	
"Everything I've Known"	Meadow (with Branigan on backing vocals)	Chris Van Cleave	The Friend Ship	1973	
"Find Me"	Laura Branigan	David Shire; Carol Connors	Branigan 2	1983	
"Foolish Lullaby"	Laura Branigan	Jack White; Mark Spiro	Hold Me	1985	
"Fool's Affair" †	Laura Branigan	Richard Kerr; Troy Seals	Single only	1980	
"Forever Young"	Laura Branigan	Marian Gold; Frank Mertens; Bernhard Lloyd	Hold Me	1985	
"Gloria" †	Laura Branigan	Umberto Tozzi; Giancarlo Bigazzi; Trevor Veitch	Branigan	1982	
"Gloria 2004" † (Re-recorded vocals)	Laura Branigan	Umberto Tozzi; Giancarlo Bigazzi; Trevor Veitch	Single only	2004	
"Hark! The Herald Angels Sing"	Laura Branigan	Charles Wesley	The Christmas Album... A Gift of Hope	1991	
"Heart"	Laura Branigan	Marie Cain; Warren Hartman	Self Control	1984	
"Heart of Me" †	Cerrone and Laura Branigan	Marc Cerrone; Christian Gaubert; Lene Lovich	Way In	1989	
"Helpin' Mama Bring the Groceries In"	Laura Branigan	Unknown	Unreleased	1981	
"Helpless"	Laura Branigan	Bobby Orlando	Soundtrack only	1988	
"Here I Am" ‡	Meadow (with Branigan on lead vocals)	Walker Daniels	Single only	1972	
"Hold Me" †	Laura Branigan	Beth Andersen; Bill Bodine	Hold Me	1985	
"Hollywood Wives"	Laura Branigan	Unknown	Soundtrack only	1985	
"Home Free (The Friend Ship)"	Meadow (with Branigan on backing vocals)	Walker Daniels; Chris Van Cleave	The Friend Ship	1973	
"Hot Night" ‡	Laura Branigan	Diane Warren; The Doctor	Ghostbusters (Soundtrack album)	1984	
"How Am I Supposed to Live Without You" †	Laura Branigan	Michael Bolton; Doug James	Branigan 2	1983	
"How Can I Help You to Say Goodbye" †	Laura Branigan	Karen Taylor-Good; Burton Collins	Over My Heart	1993	
"I Believe" †	David Hasselhoff and Laura Branigan	Brian Alexander Robertson; John Lewis Parker	Baywatch (Soundtrack album)	1994	
"I Can See Again"	Laura Branigan	Diane Scanlon; Eve Nelson	Unreleased	2004	
"I Love the Nightlife" (live)	Laura Branigan	Alicia Bridges; Susan Hutcheson	Gut Gestimmt	1980	
"I Found Someone"	Laura Branigan	Michael Bolton; Mark Mangold	Hold Me	1985	
"I Know You by Heart"	Laura Branigan	Diane Scanlon; Eve Nelson	Unreleased	2004	
"I Wish We Could Be Alone"	Laura Branigan	Laura Branigan §	Branigan	1982	
"If I Were"	Laura Branigan	Laura Branigan §	Soundtrack only	1986	
"If That's What It Takes"	Laura Branigan	Jean-Jacques Goldman; Phil Galdston	Unreleased	2004	
"If You Loved Me"	Laura Branigan	Diane Warren; The Doctor	Branigan	1982	
"I'll Wait for You"	Laura Branigan	Laura Branigan § Kevin Wells	Over My Heart	1993	
"I'm Just Warmin' Up"	Laura Branigan	Barbara Wyrick	Unreleased	1981	
"I'm Not the Only One"	Laura Branigan	Diane Warren; The Doctor	Branigan 2	1983	
"Imagination"	Laura Branigan	Michael Boddicker; Jerry Hey; Phil Ramone; Michael Sembello	Flashdance (Soundtrack album)	1983	
"In Time"	Laura Branigan	Alan Roy Scott; Laura Branigan §	Unreleased	late 1990s	
"Is There Anybody Here But Me"	Laura Branigan	Kevin Wells; André Pessis	Over My Heart	1993	
"It's Been Hard Enough Getting Over You" †	Laura Branigan	Michael Bolton; Doug James	Over My Heart	1993	
"The Lady I Am" (live)	Laura Branigan	Gretta Larson	Gut Gestimmt	1980	
"Lawless Lady"	Meadow (with Branigan on lead vocals)	S. Albert; M. Newman	The Friend Ship	1973	
"Leave Me Blind"	Laura Branigan	Unknown	Unreleased	1981	
"Let Me In"	Laura Branigan	Dennis Matkosky; Paul Gordon	Laura Branigan	1990	
"Living a Lie"	Laura Branigan	Dick St. Nicklaus; Sue Neal	Branigan	1982	
"Lonely Nights"	Laura Branigan	Beppe Cantarelli; Adrienne Anderson	Soundtrack only	1988	
"Looking Out for Number One" †	Laura Branigan	Bill Bodine; Jack Tempchin	Single only	1981	
"Love Is Forever"	Laura Branigan	Lee Holdridge; Carol Connors	Soundtrack only	1983	
"Love Me Tonight"	Laura Branigan	Robbie Seidman	B-side to "Looking Out for Number One"	1981	
"A Love Until the End of Time"	Laura Branigan	Lee Holdridge; Carol Connors	Soundtrack only	1982	
"Love Your Girl" ‡	Laura Branigan	Gloria Estefan; Jorge Casas; Clay Ostwald	Over My Heart	1993	
"Lovin' You Baby"	Laura Branigan	Adrian John Loveridge; John Wonderling	Branigan	1982	
"Lucky"	Laura Branigan	Steve Bi	Branigan 2	1983	
"The Lucky One" †	Laura Branigan	Bruce Roberts	Self Control	1984	
"Mama"	Laura Branigan	Giancarlo Bigazzi; Umberto Tozzi; Diane Warren	Branigan 2	1983	
"Mangwane (The Wedding Song)"	Laura Branigan	Traditional	Over My Heart	1993	
"Maybe I Love You"	Laura Branigan	Trevor Veitch; Greg Mathieson; Alan Sorrenti	Branigan	1982	
"Maybe Tonight" †	Laura Branigan	Jack White; Mark Spiro	Hold Me	1985	
"Meaning of the Word"	Laura Branigan	Rick Palombi; Roy Freeland	Touch	1987	
"Memories" ‡	Laura Branigan	Laura Branigan §	Single only	1978	
"Moonlight on Water" †	Laura Branigan	Andy Goldmark; Steve Kipner	Laura Branigan	1990	
"More Than Just a Memory"	Laura Branigan	Mayo Okamoto; Richard Wold	Mayo Okamoto Songbook: Once in a Lifetime	2003	
"A Much, Much Greater Love"	Laura Branigan	Alan Bernstein; Ritchie Adams	Unreleased	1978	
"Mujer contra mujer"	Laura Branigan	José María Cano	Over My Heart	1993	
"Name Game" ‡	Laura Branigan	Shirley Ellis; Lincoln Chase	Touch	1987	
"Never in a Million Years" †	Laura Branigan	Van Stephenson; Dave Robbins; Bob Farrell	Laura Branigan	1990	
"Nights in White Satin"	Laura Branigan	Justin Hayward	Unreleased	mid 1970s	
"No Promise, No Guarantee"	Laura Branigan	Bonnie Karlyle; Pat Robinson	Laura Branigan	1990	
"One Day"	Laura Branigan	Patrick Williams; Will Jennings	Soundtrack only	1986	
"Only Time Will Tell"	Laura Branigan	Kevin Wells; André Pessis	Over My Heart	1993	
"Over Love"	Laura Branigan	Sue Shifrin; Bob Marlette	Touch	1987	
"Over My Heart"	Laura Branigan	Eric Martin; André Pessis	Over My Heart	1993	
"Over You"	Laura Branigan	Laura Branigan § Billy Branigan	Over My Heart	1993	
"Passion and Valor"	Laura Branigan	Lee Holdridge; Carol Connors	Soundtrack only	1983	
"Please Stay, Go Away"	Laura Branigan	Adrian John Loveridge; John Wonderling	Branigan	1982	
"Power of Love" †	Laura Branigan	Candy DeRouge; Gunther Mende; Jennifer Rush; Mary Susan Applegate	Touch	1987	
"Promise Me I'll Feel This Way Tomorrow"	Laura Branigan	Gary William Friedman	Unreleased	late 1970s	
"Reverse Psychology"	Laura Branigan	Steve Kipner; Clif Magness	Laura Branigan	1990	
"Room With a View"	Laura Branigan	Alan Roy Scott; Laura Branigan § William Perez	Unreleased	late 1990s	
"A Rose and a Tear"	Laura Branigan	Laura Branigan §	Unreleased	1977	
"Sanctuary"	Laura Branigan	Gary Usher; Tom Kelly	Hold Me	1985	
"Satisfaction" †	Laura Branigan	Bernd Dietrich; Gerd Grabowski; Engelbert Simons; Mark Spiro; Diane Warren	Self Control	1984	
"See How They Run"	Meadow (with Branigan on lead vocals)	Walker Daniels; Chris Van Cleave; Laura Branigan §	The Friend Ship	1973	
"Self Control" †	Laura Branigan	Giancarlo Bigazzi; Raffaele Riefoli; Steve Piccolo	Self Control	1984	
"Self Control 2004" † (Re-recorded vocals)	Laura Branigan	Giancarlo Bigazzi; Raffaele Riefoli; Steve Piccolo	Single only	2004	
"Shadow of Love"	Laura Branigan	Sue Shifrin; Bob Marlette	Touch	1987	
"Sharpshooter"	Laura Branigan	Larry Gottlieb; Marc Blatte	Body Rock (Soundtrack album)	1984	
"Shattered Glass" †	Laura Branigan	Bob Mitchell; Steve Coe	Touch	1987	
"Show Me Heaven"	Laura Branigan	Jay Rifkin; Eric Rackin; Maria McKee	The Best of Branigan	1995	
"Silent Partners"	Laura Branigan	Diane Warren; The Doctor	Self Control	1984	
"Silver Dreams"	Laura Branigan	Unknown	Unreleased	1981	
"Sin hablar"	Luis Miguel featuring Laura Branigan	Juan Carlos Calderón	Soy como quiero ser	1987	
"Smoke Screen"	Laura Branigan	Steve Kipner; Clif Magness	Laura Branigan	1990	
"So Lost Without Your Love"	Laura Branigan	Michael Bolton; Patrick Henderson	Soundtrack only	1988	
"Solitaire" †	Laura Branigan	Martine Clémenceau; Diane Warren	Branigan 2	1983	
"Something Borrowed Something Blues"	Meadow (with Branigan on backing vocals)	Walker Daniels; R. Daniels	B-side to "Here I Am"	1972	
"Spanish Eddie" †	Laura Branigan	David Palmer; Chuck Cochran	Hold Me	1985	
"Spirit of Love" †	Laura Branigan	Rick Nowels; Ellen Shipley; Billy Steinberg	Touch	1987	
"Squeeze Box"	Laura Branigan	Pete Townshend	Branigan 2	1983	
"Statue in the Rain"	Laura Branigan	Rick Palombi; Mathew Garey	Touch	1987	
"The Sweet Hello, The Sad Goodbye"	Laura Branigan	Per Gessle	Over My Heart	1993	
"Sweet Life"	Meadow (with Branigan on backing vocals)	Walker Daniels; Chris Van Cleave; Laura Branigan §	The Friend Ship	1973	
"Take Me"	Laura Branigan	John Parker; Steve Kipner	Self Control	1984	
"Tell Him" †	Laura Branigan	Bert Berns	Single only	1981	
"Tenderness"	Laura Branigan	Jack White; Mark Spiro; Laura Branigan §	Hold Me	1985	
"There's Only One Thing to Remember"	Meadow (with Branigan on backing vocals)	Walker Daniels	The Friend Ship	1973	
"Ti amo" †	Laura Branigan	Giancarlo Bigazzi; Umberto Tozzi; Diane Warren	Self Control	1984	
"Time Strangers"	Laura Branigan	Mariya Takeuchi	Sincerely... Mariya Takeuchi Songbook	2002	
"Tokio" †	Laura Branigan	Michelle Hart; Joey Carbone	The Best of Laura Branigan (Japanese edition)	1991	
"Touch"	Laura Branigan	Sue Shifrin; Bob Marlette	Touch	1987	
"Turn the Beat Around" †	Laura Branigan	Gerald Jackson; Peter Jackson	Laura Branigan	1990	
"Unison"	Laura Branigan	Bruce Roberts; Andy Goldmark	Laura Branigan	1990	
"Vanity Fair"	Meadow (with Branigan on backing vocals)	Walker Daniels	The Friend Ship	1973	
"What a Woman Wants"	Laura Branigan	Unknown	Unreleased	1985	
"Whatever I Do"	Laura Branigan	Mike Stock; Matt Aitken	Touch	1987	
"When"	Laura Branigan	Laura Branigan §	B-side to "Fool's Affair"	1980	
"When I'm with You"	Laura Branigan	Jack White; Mark Spiro; Harold Faltermeyer	Hold Me	1985	
"When the Heat Hits the Streets"	Laura Branigan	Linda Schreyer; Cappy Capossela	Hold Me	1985	
"When You Were Young"	Meadow (with Branigan on lead vocals)	Walker Daniels	The Friend Ship	1973	
"Will You Still Love Me Tomorrow"	Laura Branigan	Gerry Goffin; Carole King	Self Control	1984	
"The Winner Takes It All"	Laura Branigan	Benny Andersson; Björn Ulvaeus	Unreleased	2004	
"With Every Beat of My Heart" †	Laura Branigan	Bob Mitchell; Jamie Kaleth	Self Control	1984	
"Your Love"	Laura Branigan	David Friedman	Salsa (Soundtrack album)	1988	
