= Shine On: The Ultimate Collection =

Greatest hits album by Laura Branigan
- Released: June 15, 2010
- Recorded: 1982–1995
- Genre: Pop, rock, dance
- Label: Gallo, Warner Music

Laura Branigan chronology
The Platinum Collection (2006)	Shine On: The Ultimate Collection (2010)

Professional ratings
Review scores
Source	Rating
Tonight	4/5 stars
iafrica.com	4/5 stars

Shine On: The Ultimate Collection is a digitally remastered two-disc greatest hits compilation album of American singer Laura Branigan. It is the Grammy-nominated vocalist's first multi-disc collection and her first music video compilation. It was released on June 15, 2010, by Gallo and Warner Music in South Africa and is available as an import in other regions through Branigan's official website. Nearly all the tracks on the first disc are edited versions.

The first disc is an 18-track CD featuring Branigan's biggest hits, including international hit singles "Gloria" and "Self Control" along with rarer songs such as "Forever Young", from the long out-of-print 1985 album Hold Me, and the two recordings recorded for her 1995 collection The Best of Branigan, "Show Me Heaven" and "Dim All the Lights".

The second disc is a DVD featuring all except one of Branigan's Atlantic Records music videos, including the 1984 "Self Control" clip helmed by Academy Award-winning director William Friedkin. Branigan was nominated for a 1985 American Music Award as Favorite Pop/Rock Female Video Artist on the basis of that and her other 1984 music video, "The Lucky One". The only one of Branigan's Atlantic videos not included in the set is the 1988 clip for "Cry Wolf", which was intended for inclusion until Gallo and Warner Music were unable to locate an original source tape.

== Track listing ==
No.	Title	Writer(s)	Length
1.	"Ti Amo"	Giancarlo Bigazzi, Umberto Tozzi, Diane Warren	4:18
2.	"Spanish Eddie"	David Palmer, Chuck Cochran	4:10
3.	"Solitaire"	Martine Clemenceau, Warren	4:07
4.	"Self Control"	Bigazzi, Steve Piccolo, Raffaele Riefoli	4:08
5.	"Gloria"	Bigazzi, Tozzi, Trevor Veitch	4:50
6.	"Cry Wolf"	Jude Johnstone	4:49
7.	"Maybe Tonight"	Jack White, Mark Spiro	3:40
8.	"Shattered Glass"	Bob Mitchell, Steve Coe	3:41
9.	"Show Me Heaven"	Maria McKee, Eric Rackin, Jay Rifkin	4:11
10.	"The Lucky One"	Bruce Roberts	4:10
11.	"Power of Love"	Gunther Mende, Candy DeRouge, Jennifer Rush, Mary Susan Applegate	5:26
12.	"I Found Someone"	Michael Bolton, Mark Mangold	4:01
13.	"Moonlight on Water"	Andy Goldmark, Steve Kipner	4:39
14.	"Didn't We Almost Win It All"	Laura Branigan, Brian BecVar	5:09
15.	"Forever Young"	Bernhard Lloyd, Marian Gold, Frank Mertens	3:57
16.	"How Am I Supposed to Live Without You"	Bolton, Doug James	4:29
17.	"Dim All the Lights"	Donna Summer	4:44
18.	"Gloria" (DJ C Radio edit)	Bigazzi, Tozzi, Veitch	3:09

DVD – Music videos
No.	Title	Length
1.	"Shattered Glass"	3:41
2.	"Maybe Tonight"	3:40
3.	"Spanish Eddie"	4:10
4.	"The Lucky One"	4:10
5.	"Gloria"	4:50
6.	"Self Control"	5:00
7.	"Dim All the Lights"	4:44
8.	"Didn't We Almost Win It All"	5:09
9.	"Moonlight on Water"	4:39
10.	"Solitaire"	4:07
