= The Platinum Collection (Laura Branigan album) =

Greatest hits album by Laura Branigan
- Released: July 24, 2006
- Recorded: 1982–1990
- Genre: Pop, rock, dance
- Label: Rhino, Warner Music
- Producer: Jack White, Harold Faltermeyer, Stock/Aitken/Waterman, David Kershenbaum, Richard Perry, Peter Wolf, Robbie Buchanan, Greg Mathieson

Laura Branigan chronology
| The Essentials (2002) | The Platinum Collection (2006) | Shine On: The Ultimate Collection (2010) |

The Platinum Collection is the first posthumous greatest hits collection of American singer Laura Branigan. It was released only in the United Kingdom and Brazil on July 24, 2006. The album is part of the Warner Platinum series released by Rhino Records.

== Track listing ==
| No. | Title | Writer(s) | Length |
|---|---|---|---|
| 1. | "Gloria" | Giancarlo Bigazzi, Umberto Tozzi, Trevor Veitch | 4:50 |
| 2. | "Self Control" | Bigazzi, Steve Piccolo, Raffaele Riefoli | 4:08 |
| 3. | "The Lucky One" | Bruce Roberts | 4:10 |
| 4. | "Solitaire" | Martine Clemenceau, Diane Warren | 4:07 |
| 5. | "Power of Love" | Gunther Mende, Candy DeRouge, Jennifer Rush, Mary Susan Applegate | 5:26 |
| 6. | "How Am I Supposed to Live Without You" | Michael Bolton, Doug James | 4:29 |
| 7. | "Ti Amo" | Bigazzi, Tozzi, Warren | 4:18 |
| 8. | "I Found Someone" | Bolton, Mark Mangold | 4:01 |
| 9. | "Will You Still Love Me Tomorrow" | Gerry Goffin, Carole King | 3:26 |
| 10. | "Spanish Eddie" | David Palmer, Chuck Cochran | 4:10 |
| 11. | "All Night with Me" | Chris Montan | 3:52 |
| 12. | "Lovin' You Baby" | Adrian Loveridge, John Wonderling | 4:34 |
| 13. | "Shattered Glass" | Bob Mitchell, Steve Coe | 3:41 |
| 14. | "Never in a Million Years" | Van Stephenson, Dave Robbins, Bob Farrell | 4:08 |
| 15. | "Moonlight on Water" | Andy Goldmark, Steve Kipner | 4:39 |
| 16. | "Satisfaction" | Bernd Dietrich, Gerd Grabowski, Engelbert Simons, Mark Spiro, Warren | 3:56 |
| 17. | "If You Loved Me" | Warren, The Doctor | 3:15 |
| 18. | "Silent Partners" | Warren, The Doctor | 4:10 |
