= The Best of Laura Branigan =

- Asian cover art

Greatest hits album by Laura Branigan
- Released: 1988
- Recorded: 1982–1991
- Genre: Pop, rock, dance
- Label: Atlantic
- Producer: Jack White, Harold Faltermeyer, Stock/Aitken/Waterman, David Kershenbaum, Richard Perry, Peter Wolf, Robbie Buchanan, Greg Mathieson

Laura Branigan chronology
Touch (1987)	The Best of Laura Branigan (1988)	Laura Branigan (1990)

Alternative cover
- Japanese cover art

Singles from The Best of Laura Branigan
- 1. "Tokio" Released: 1991

The Best of Laura Branigan is the first compilation album by American singer Laura Branigan. It was released in 1988 in Australia, Asia and South Africa, and in 1991 in Japan. The Japanese version included a new recording, "Tokio", which was released as a single only in Japan. The album was followed by The Very Best of Laura Branigan in Australia, as well as Europe, and The Best of Laura Branigan, Volume 2 in South Africa.

The album was later remastered and reissued in South Africa in 1999 under the title Remember: The Very Best of Laura Branigan. The track listing remained the same as the South African 1988 release.

== Track listings ==
Asian version

No.	Title	Writer(s)	Length
1.	"Gloria"	Giancarlo Bigazzi, Umberto Tozzi, Trevor Veitch	4:50
2.	"Shattered Glass"	Bob Mitchell, Steve Coe	3:41
3.	"Find Me"	David Shire, Carol Connors	3:22
4.	"Touch"	Sue Shifrin, Bob Marlette	4:06
5.	"How Am I Supposed to Live Without You"	Michael Bolton, Doug James	4:29
6.	"Power of Love"	Candy DeRouge, Gunther Mende, Jennifer Rush, Mary Susan Applegate	5:26
7.	"Self Control"	Bigazzi, Raffaele Riefoli, Steve Piccolo	4:08
8.	"The Lucky One"	Bruce Roberts	4:10
9.	"Will You Still Love Me Tomorrow"	Gerry Goffin, Carole King	3:26
10.	"Solitaire"	Martine Clémenceau, Diane Warren	4:07
11.	"Spanish Eddie"	David Palmer, Chuck Cochran	4:10
12.	"Forever Young"	Marian Gold, Frank Mertens, Bernhard Lloyd	3:57

Australian and South African version

No.	Title	Writer(s)	Length
1.	"Gloria"	Bigazzi, Tozzi, Veitch	4:17
2.	"Self Control"	Bigazzi, Riefoli, Piccolo	4:08
3.	"Solitaire"	Clémenceau, Warren	4:07
4.	"How Am I Supposed to Live Without You"	Bolton, James	4:29
5.	"The Lucky One"	Roberts	4:10
6.	"Forever Young"	Gold, Mertens, Lloyd	3:52
7.	"Shattered Glass"	Mitchell, Coe	3:40
8.	"Spanish Eddie"	Palmer, Cochran	4:08
9.	"Ti Amo"	Bigazzi, Tozzi, Warren	4:18
10.	"Maybe Tonight"	Jack White, Mark Spiro	3:47
11.	"Cry Wolf"	Jude Johnstone	4:48
12.	"Power of Love"	DeRouge, Mende, Rush, Applegate	5:20

Japanese version

No.	Title	Writer(s)	Length
1.	"No Promise, No Guarantee"	Bonnie Karlyle, Pat Robinson	5:00
2.	"Never in a Million Years"	Van Stephenson, Dave Robbins, Bob Farrell	4:08
3.	"The Lucky One"	Roberts	4:10
4.	"Solitaire"	Clémenceau, Warren	4:07
5.	"Will You Still Love Me Tomorrow"	Goffin, King	3:26
6.	"How Am I Supposed to Live Without You"	Bolton, James	4:29
7.	"Self Control"	Bigazzi, Riefoli, Piccolo	4:08
8.	"Gloria"	Bigazzi, Tozzi, Veitch	4:50
9.	"Forever Young"	Gold, Mertens, Lloyd	3:57
10.	"Tokio"	Michelle Hart, Joey Carbone	4:40
