= The Very Best of Laura Branigan =

1992 greatest hits album by Laura Branigan

Greatest hits album by Laura Branigan
- Released: November 16, 1992
- Recorded: 1982–1990
- Label: Atlantic
- Producer: Robbie Buchanan; Harold Faltermeyer; David Kershenbaum; Greg Mathieson; Richard Perry; Stock Aitken Waterman; Jack White; Peter Wolf

Laura Branigan chronology
Laura Branigan (1990)	The Very Best of Laura Branigan (1992)	Over My Heart (1993)

The Very Best of Laura Branigan is a greatest hits album by American singer Laura Branigan, released solely in Europe on November 15, 1992. The album includes fifteen hits and a new 'Classic Summer Mix' of Branigan's biggest international hit "Self Control". An American greatest hits album, The Best of Branigan, was released three years later in 1995.

== Track listing ==
No.	Title	Writer(s)	Length
1.	"Self Control" (Classic Summer Mix)	Bigazzi, Piccolo, Riefoli	4:01
2.	"Ti Amo"	Bigazzi, Tozzi, Warren	4:18
3.	"The Lucky One"	Roberts	4:10
4.	"Spanish Eddie"	Palmer, Cochran	4:10
5.	"Shadow of Love"	Marlette, Shifrin	5:05
6.	"Will You Still Love Me Tomorrow"	Goffin, King	3:26
7.	"How Am I Supposed to Live Without You"	Bolton, James	4:29
8.	"I Found Someone"	Bolton, Mangold	4:01
9.	"Gloria"	Bigazzi, Tozzi, Veitch	4:50
10.	"Shattered Glass"	Coe, Mitchell	3:41
11.	"Moonlight on Water"	Goldmark, Kipner	4:39
12.	"Solitaire"	Clemenceau, Warren	4:07
13.	"Maybe Tonight"	White, Spiro	3:40
14.	"Power of Love"	Applegate, DeRouge, Mende, Rush	5:26
15.	"The Best Was Yet to Come"	Adams, Vallance	3:21
16.	"Self Control"	Bigazzi, Piccolo, Riefoli	4:08

== Charts ==
1992 chart performance for The Very Best of Laura Branigan
Chart (1992/93)	Peak position
European Albums (Music & Media)	90
Finnish Albums (Suomen virallinen lista)	2
Danish Albums (Hitlisten)	3

== Certifications ==
Certifications for The Very Best of Laura Branigan
Region	Certification	Certified units/sales
Finland (Musiikkituottajat)	Gold	25,884
