= Coming of Age (Jude Johnstone album) =

Studio album by Jude Johnstone
- Released: 2002
- Genre: Folk
- Label: BoJak Records
- Producer: Charles Duncan, Garth Fundis, Jude Johnstone

Jude Johnstone chronology
| Coming of Age (2002) | On a Good Day (2005) |

Coming of Age (2002) is the debut studio album from Jude Johnstone.

== Track listing ==
All tracks are written by Jude Johnstone

| No. | Title | Length |
|---|---|---|
| 1. | "Cry Wolf" | 4:16 |
| 2. | "Coming of Age" | 5:05 |
| 3. | "Wounded Heart" | 5:00 |
| 4. | "Not Long for This World" | 3:17 |
| 5. | "Hearts in Armor" | 5:07 |
| 6. | "Doesn't Anybody Know But Me" | 2:59 |
| 7. | "Unchained" | 4:10 |
| 8. | "The Nightingale" | 4:17 |
| 9. | "The Water's Edge" | 4:24 |
| 10. | "Let's Leave It Open" | 3:49 |
| 11. | "When Someone Speaks Your Name" | 3:37 |

== Personnel ==
- Jude Johnstone - vocals, piano
- Charles Duncan - guitar, dobro, pennywhistle, accordion, programming, background vocals
- Biff Watson - acoustic guitar
- George Marinelli - electric guitar
- Bonnie Raitt - slide guitar, background vocals
- Mary Alice Hoepfinger - harp
- John Willis - mandolin
- David Mansfield - violin
- Salvador Garza - violin
- David Davidson - violin
- Mary Ramsey - viola
- Kristin Wilkinson - string arrangements, viola
- John Catchings - cello
- John Hobbs - piano, Fender Rhodes piano, keyboards, synthesizer
- Dave Pomeroy - upright bass
- Mauricio-Fritz Lewak - drums
- Shannon Forrest - drums
- Sam Bacco - percussion
- Joe Jenkins - background vocals
- Garth Fundis - background vocals
- Jackson Browne - background vocals
- Jennifer Warnes - background vocals
- Trisha Yearwood - background vocals
- Valerie Carter - background vocals
- Jill Knight - background vocals
