= On a Good Day =

Studio album by Jude Johnstone
- Released: February 22, 2005
- Genre: Country pop, indie rock
- Label: BoJak Records
- Producer: Charles Duncan, Jude Johnstone

Jude Johnstone chronology
Coming of Age (2002)	On a Good Day (2005)	Blue Light (2007)

Professional ratings
Review scores
Source	Rating
Allmusic	4.5/5 stars

On a Good Day is the second album by the American singer-songwriter Jude Johnstone, released in 2005.

== Track listing ==
1. "On a Good Day" – 4:07
2. "20 Years" – 3:59
3. "Hard Lessons" – 4:24
4. "Hold On" – 4:32
5. "In This House" – 3:36
6. "Old and Gray" – 3:39
7. "Evelyn" – 5:41
8. "Pen and Paper" – 3:38
9. "Deep Water" – 3:57
10. "Long Way Back" – 4:44
11. "The Hereafter" – 3:31

== Personnel ==
- Jude Johnstone - vocals, piano
- Jackson Browne - vocals
- Julie Miller - vocals
- Rodney Crowell - vocals
- Bonnie Raitt - vocals
- Charles Duncan - guitar, organ
- Mary Ramsey - viola
- Bob Liepman - cello
- Kevin McCormick - bass guitar
- Mauricio-Fritz Lewak - drums
