= Mangwane Mpulele =

Mangwane Mpulele is a traditional song in the Sotho language. In South Africa it has been performed by Tsidii Le Loka, Yvonne Chaka Chaka, Judith Sephuma, Carike Keuzenkamp and the Soweto String Quartet. International artists who have performed it include Theodore Bikel, Harry Belafonte, Norman Luboff Choir, The Kingston Trio under the name Mangwani M'Pulele and Laura Branigan under the name Mangwane (The Wedding Song).

Roughly translated, the lyrics mean "Aunt, open the door for me, I am getting wet with rain. Whether it is here, whether it is there, I am getting wet with rain." "Mangwane" in Sotho culture is a mother's younger sister.

Mangwane mpulele, ke nelwa ke pula (A Mangwani) Mangwane mpulele, ke nelwa ke pula
Le haele mule, le haele mula ke nelwa ke pula (A Mangwane) (Repeat this line)
