= Come into My Life (Laura Branigan and Joe Esposito song) =

Single by Laura Branigan & Joe Esposito

from the album Coming to America soundtrack
- B-side: "Believe in Me"
- Released: 1988
- Genre: Pop; rock
- Length: 4:39 (album version); 4:09 (edited remix); 4:12 (instrumental)
- Label: Atco
- Songwriter(s): Paul Chiten; Pamela Philips-Oland

Laura Branigan singles chronology
"Name Game" (1988)	"Come into My Life" (1988)	"Moonlight on Water" (1990)

"Come into My Life" is a song recorded in 1988 as a duet between singers Laura Branigan and Joe Esposito. It was featured on the soundtrack to the film Coming to America and released in the United States as the second single after the title-track by The System. The 7" single included a previously unreleased song by Branigan entitled "Believe in Me" as the b-side.

== Track listings ==
7" single
No.	Title	Length
1.	"Come into My Life"	4:39
2.	"Believe in Me" (performed by Laura Branigan)	4:46

CD single – Promo
No.	Title	Length
1.	"Come into My Life" (Edited remix)	4:09
2.	"Come into My Life" (Instrumental)	4:12
