= Looking Out for Number One (Laura Branigan song) =

1981 single by Laura Branigan

Single by Laura Branigan
- B-side: "Love Me Tonight"
- Released: 1981
- Genre: Dance-pop
- Length: 4:23
- Label: Atlantic
- Songwriters: Bill Bodine; Jack Tempchin
- Producers: Ahmet Ertegun; Arif Mardin

Laura Branigan singles chronology
"Fool's Affair" (1980)	"Looking Out for Number One" (1981)	"Tell Him" (1981)

"Looking Out for Number One" is a single by the American singer Laura Branigan. It was to have been the second single from her scheduled first album, which is commonly referred to as Silver Dreams. The album was canceled because of a contract lawsuit with her management and to this day remains unreleased officially. A selection of the tracks from the canceled album, including this single, was later included on a re-release of the Branigan album.

== Background ==
The song was released as a promotional single issued to radio stations as an edited 45 rpm EP (with stereo and mono sides) and to clubs as an extended 12-inch 32 rpm record. Both song releases are the Midnight mix by Richie Rivera, which uses the same vocal take as the album version but a significantly different and extended version of the background arrangement. The song became a minor club hit in the United States, reaching number 60 on the Club Play Singles chart.

On some versions of the single "Love Me Tonight", another song from the unreleased album, was on the B-side. It is unconfirmed whether the version of "Looking Out for Number One" found on this release of the single, which is extremely difficult to find as opposed to the other two releases, is the album or Midnight mix version of the song. "Looking Out for Number One" and its B-side are two out of four songs from the Silver Dreams album, which had a track listing of nine, to have been officially released by Atlantic Records. The two others are "Fool's Affair", which was recorded and released at the same time by Melissa Manchester in 1980, and a song was written by Branigan called "When" which appeared as the B-side to "I Found Someone" in 1985.

Since the mid-1990s, unauthorized MP3 format copies of the 12-inch version have been circulated online. The unauthorized MP3 version is not an additional remix or a variant of the song, despite its shorter track length of 5:25. The seven seconds of missing audio are from the very end of the song where it fades out and is nearly inaudible when listening to the actual vinyl record.

Both the 7-inch and 12-inch versions of the Midnight mix were later included as bonus tracks on the expanded edition of Branigan, released by Gold Legion in 2014. This was the first time any version of the song has been officially released on an album.

== Track listings ==
7" single
No.	Title	Length
1.	"Looking Out for Number One"	4:23
2.	"Love Me Tonight"	3:32

7" single – Promo
No.	Title	Length
1.	"Looking Out for Number One" (7" Midnight mix)	3:56

12" single – Promo
No.	Title	Length
1.	"Looking Out for Number One" (12" Midnight mix)	5:32

== Charts ==
Chart (1981)	Peak position
U.S. Club Play Singles	60
