= Tokyo Music Festival =

International music contest operating from 1972 to 1992

- Genre: Pop music
- Dates: 13 May 1972
- Years active: 1972 to 1992
- Founders: Tokyo Music Festival Foundation

The Tokyo Music Festival was an international music contest that ran from 1972 to 1992. Organized by the Tokyo Music Festival Foundation, it was usually held at the Nippon Budokan. The first edition of the Tokyo Music Festival took place on 13 May 1972 with 12 participating countries.

== Grand Prix Winners ==
- 1972: Izumi Yukimura (Japan), with "Watashi wa Nakanai"
- 1973: Mickey Newbury (United States), with "Heaven Help the Child"
- 1974: René Simard (Canada), with "Midori-iro no Yane"
- 1975: Maureen McGovern (United States), with "Even Better Than I Know Myself"
- 1976: Natalie Cole (United States), with "I'm Glad There Is You"
- 1977: Marilyn McCoo & Billy Davis Jr. (United States), with "The Two of Us"
- 1978: Al Green (United States), with "Belle"
- 1979: Rita Coolidge (United States), with "Don't Cry Out Loud"
- 1980: Dionne Warwick (United States), with "Feeling Old Feelings"
- 1981: The Nolans (United Kingdom), with "Sexy Music"
- 1982: John O'Banion (United States), with "I Don't Wanna Lose Your Love"
- 1983: Lionel Richie (United States), with "You Are"; Joe Cocker (United Kingdom) and Jennifer Warnes (United States), with "Up Where We Belong"
- 1984: Laura Branigan (United States), with "The Lucky One"
- 1985: Kool & the Gang (United States), with "Cherish"
- 1986: Miami Sound Machine (United States), with "Conga"
- 1987: No Grand Prix awarded
- 1988: No Grand Prix awarded
- 1989: Ofra Haza (Israel), with "Im Nin'alu"
- 1990: Wilson Phillips (United States), with "Hold On"
- 1991: Cancelled
- 1992: Smokey Mountain (Philippines), with "Paraiso"

== See also ==
- List of historic rock festivals
