= Touch (Laura Branigan album) =

1987 studio album by Laura Branigan

Studio album by Laura Branigan
- Released: July 7, 1987
- Studios: Powertrax (Hollywood, California)
- Length: 48:39
- Label: Atlantic
- Producers: David Kershenbaum; Stock Aitken Waterman; Albert Cabrera; Tony Moran

Laura Branigan chronology
Hold Me (1985)	Touch (1987)	The Best of Laura Branigan (1988)

Singles from Touch
- 1. "Shattered Glass" Released: June 5, 1987; 2. "Power of Love" Released: October 1987; 3. "Spirit of Love" Released: 1987; 4. "Cry Wolf" Released: 1988; 5. "Name Game" Released: 1988 (Philippines)

Professional ratings
Review scores
Source	Rating
AllMusic	3/5 stars

Touch is the fifth studio album by American singer Laura Branigan, released on July 7, 1987, by Atlantic Records. The album saw Branigan's return to dancefloors with the lead single, the Stock Aitken Waterman-produced "Shattered Glass", which was released in June 1987 and reached number 48 on the Billboard Hot 100. The album's second single, a cover of Jennifer Rush's "Power of Love", was released in October 1987, peaking at number 26 on the Billboard Hot 100. "Spirit of Love" was released as a single in Europe, while "Cry Wolf" served as the album's third single in the United States.

== Reception ==
In their review of the album, Billboard commented "pop songstress gets to showcase her strongest assets here: powerful, sustained vocals and convincing lyric interpretation. The results fit best with adult contemporary; album offers more ballads than usual. Best bets: "Shattered Glass," produced by Stock, Aitken, Waterman; "Over Love " and "Spirit Of Love."

Cashbox praised the album, stating that "international favorite backs off of her signature disco sonics allowing her dramatic, often plaintive vocals to shine through. The song selection on Touch ranges from delicate, introspective heart surgeries to full force gale blowers on which she exercises the breadth of her amazing range."

Allmusic noted that "Laura Branigan's fifth album, Touch, showed signs of maturity as she made a bid (that was not quite successful) for adult contemporary crossover - a smart chance to take considering the longevity many A/C acts have. Her big, boomy voice is perfect for some of the moody ballads on this collection, such as "Over Love," "Meaning of the Word," and "Spirit of Love," but there are so many of those successfully evocative cuts that the dance songs don't fit as seamlessly as they should. That's not to say the upbeat tracks are not in good shape: The lead single, "Shattered Glass" and "Angels Calling" stand out; you can hardly hold back from caroling along. Synthesizer-heavy throughout, on both the slow and fast songs, the strings on the yearning "Cry Wolf" near the end of the album are welcome. The lyrics on many of the cuts are poetic and adult, making this atmospheric collection the best product she'd released so far; the material is far better suited to her voice - which has never sounded better."

The Canberra Times called it "a work of dazzling stylistic scope...Never before has Laura sounded this powerful and emotive. Never before has she seemed this much in control of her musical direction. With Touch, Laura Branigan proves that her artistry is only now reaching full bloom."

== Track listing ==
All tracks produced by David Kershenbaum, except "Shattered Glass" and "Whatever I Do", produced by Stock Aitken Waterman; additional production on "Name Game" by Albert Cabrera and Tony Moran.

No.	Title	Writer(s)	Length
1.	"Over Love"	Sue Shifrin; Bob Marlette	3:44
2.	"Shadow of Love"	Shifrin; Marlette	5:05
3.	"Angels Calling"	Rosetta Stone; Jan Mullaney	3:49
4.	"Meaning of the Word"	Rick Palombi; Roy Freeland	5:41
5.	"Power of Love"	Candy DeRouge; Gunther Mende; Jennifer Rush; Mary Susan Applegate	5:20
6.	"Shattered Glass"	Bob Mitchell; Steve Coe	3:40
7.	"Whatever I Do"	Mike Stock; Matt Aitken	4:02
8.	"Spirit of Love"	Rick Nowels; Ellen Shipley; Billy Steinberg	4:11
9.	"Name Game"	Shirley Ellis; Lincoln Chase	4:10
10.	"Touch"	Shifrin; Marlette	4:09
11.	"Cry Wolf"	Jude Johnstone	4:48
Total length:			48:39

CD bonus track
No.	Title	Writer(s)	Length
12.	"Statue in the Rain"	Rick Palombi; Mathew Garey	4:17
Total length:			52:56

== Personnel ==
Credits adapted from the liner notes of Touch.

=== Musicians ===
- Laura Branigan – lead vocals (all tracks); background vocals (tracks 1, 2, 8)
- Bob Marlette – arrangements, drum programming, guitars, keyboards (tracks 1–3, 5, 10, 11); string arrangements (tracks 5, 11); additional keyboards (track 8)
- Sue Shifrin – background vocals (tracks 1, 10)
- Andrew Thomas – PPG programming (track 1)
- Rick Palombi – arrangements, keyboards, drum programming, background vocals (tracks 4, 8)
- Mark Leggett – keyboards (track 4); arrangements, drum programming, guitars (track 8)
- Michael Landau – guitars (track 4)
- Dennis Henson – background vocals (track 4)
- Donna de Lory – background vocals (track 4)
- Mona Young – background vocals (tracks 4, 10)
- Kim Scharnberg – string arrangements, conducting (tracks 5, 11)
- Kenneth G. Kugler – copyist (tracks 5, 11)
- Julie Ann Gigante, Ralph D. Morrison III, Clayton Haslop, Alexander Horvath, R.F. Peterson, Arthur Zadinsky, Michael Nowak, Raymond J. Tischer II, Margot MacLaine, Armen Ksjikian, Dennis Karmazyn, Michael Matthews – strings (tracks 5, 11)
- John O'Hara – keyboards (tracks 6, 7)
- Mike Stock – keyboards, Linn programming, background vocals (tracks 6, 7)
- Matt Aitken – keyboards, Linn programming, guitars (tracks 6, 7)
- A. Linn – drums (tracks 6, 7)
- Dee Lewis – background vocals (tracks 6, 7)
- Coral Gordon – background vocals (tracks 6, 7)
- Jeff Lorber – arrangements, keyboards, drum programming (track 9)
- Students from St. Finbar School – background vocals (track 9)
- Carlos Vega – drums (track 11)
- John Nelson – guitars (track 11)
- David J. Holman – PPG programming (tracks 2–11)

=== Technical ===
- David Kershenbaum – production (tracks 1–5, 8–11)
- Stock Aitken Waterman – production (tracks 6, 7)
- Albert Cabrera – additional production, mix (track 9)
- Tony Moran – additional production, mix (track 9)
- John Guess – engineering (tracks 1, 2, 4)
- David J. Holman – additional engineering (tracks 1, 2, 4, 10); mixing (Note: Mixed at Powertrax (Hollywood, California)) (tracks 1–5, 8–11); engineering (tracks 3, 5, 8, 9, 11)
- Cliff Jones – additional engineering (track 2)
- Troy Krueger – additional engineering (track 4); engineering (track 10); second engineer
- Mark McGuire – engineering (tracks 6, 7)
- Peter Hammond – mixing (tracks 6, 7)
- Ray Leonard – second engineer
- Bob Ludwig – mastering (Note: Mastered at Masterdisk (New York City))

=== Artwork ===
- Janis Wilkins – art direction, design
- Victoria Pearson – photography

== Charts ==
Chart performance for Touch
Chart (1987)	Peak position
Australian Albums (Kent Music Report)	68
Canada Top Albums/CDs (RPM)	94
Swedish Albums (Sverigetopplistan)	20
Swiss Albums (Schweizer Hitparade)	24
US Billboard 200	87
US Cash Box Top 200 Albums	97
