= Laura Branigan (album) =

1990 studio album by Laura Branigan

Studio album by Laura Branigan
- Released: March 21, 1990
- Studios: Howie Sound (Studio City, California) (Note: Tracks 1 and 2); Steve Lindsey (Hollywood, California) (Note: Tracks 1, 2, 4–6, 9 and 10); Westlake (Los Angeles, California); 55 (Los Angeles, California) (Note: Tracks 1, 4 and 9); Hollywood Sound (Hollywood, California) (Note: Track 2); The Bunny Hop (Hollywood, California) (Note: Tracks 3 and 8); The Village Recorder (Los Angeles, California) (Note: Tracks 4–6, 9 and 10); Music Grinder (Hollywood, California) (Note: Track 4); Midi Madness (Los Angeles, California) (Note: Track 5); Lion Share (Los Angeles, California); Sunset Sound (Hollywood, California) (Note: Track 6); Cornerstone Recorders (Chatsworth, California) (Note: Track 7); Alpha (Burbank, California); Ultimo (Los Angeles, California) (Note: Track 10)
- Length: 43:07
- Label: Atlantic
- Producers: Laura Branigan; Rick Chudacoff; Steve Kipner; Steve Lindsey; Clif Magness; Dennis Matkosky; Richard Perry; Peter Wolf

Laura Branigan chronology
The Best of Laura Branigan (1988)	Laura Branigan (1990)	The Very Best of Laura Branigan (1992)

Singles from Laura Branigan
- 1. "Moonlight on Water" Released: 1990; 2. "Never in a Million Years" Released: 1990; 3. "Turn the Beat Around" Released: 1990

Professional ratings
Review scores
Source	Rating
AllMusic	2/5 stars
Chicago Tribune	3/4 stars
Entertainment Weekly	B−

Laura Branigan is the sixth studio album by American singer Laura Branigan, released on March 21, 1990, by Atlantic Records. The album's lead single, "Moonlight on Water", reached number 59 on the Billboard Hot 100, while the second single, "Never in a Million Years", peaked at number 22 on Billboard's Adult Contemporary chart. The third and final single, a cover version of Vicki Sue Robinson's 1976 song "Turn the Beat Around", failed to chart. The song "Unison" was recorded by Celine Dion the same year.

== Critical reception ==
Billboard Magazine praised the album for its "jaunty, up-tempo dance tunes" but noted that "Branigan still excels at shimmering tear jerker ballads like 'Never in a Million Years' and 'No Promise, No Guarantee'."

In their review of the album, Cashbox noted that "Branigan rolled out some heavyweight producers who are known for delivering the goods," and that "this is one of the most solid efforts she has produced, ranging from the ballads for which she's known to a more conscious effort to court the dance crowd."

Allmusic were much more critical in their review, "short on ideas even with a three-year layoff (they couldn't even think of an album title!), the Laura Branigan brain trust put its faith in drum programs to carry a collection of mediocre originals, a lame cover of Vicki Sue Robinson's dance classic "Turn the Beat Around," and a Bryan Adams castoff. Branigan sang with her usual gusto, but even slick producers like Richard Perry and Peter Wolf couldn't animate the material."

== Track listing ==
No.	Title	Writer(s)	Producer(s)	Length
1.	"Moonlight on Water"	Andy Goldmark; Steve Kipner	Richard Perry	4:39
2.	"Bad Attitude"	Paul Bliss; Kipner	Perry	4:00
3.	"Never in a Million Years"	Van Stephenson; Dave Robbins; Bob Farrell	Peter Wolf	4:08
4.	"Smoke Screen"	Kipner; Clif Magness	Perry; Steve Lindsey^{[a]}	4:06
5.	"Let Me In"	Dennis Matkosky; Paul Gordon	Laura Branigan; Steve Lindsey; Dennis Matkosky	5:18
6.	"Turn the Beat Around"	Gerald Jackson; Peter Jackson	Branigan; Lindsey	4:22
7.	"Unison"	Bruce Roberts; Goldmark	Peter Bunetta; Rick Chudacoff	4:40
8.	"No Promise, No Guarantee"	Bonnie Karlyle; Pat Robinson	Wolf	5:00
9.	"Reverse Psychology"	Kipner; Magness	Kipner; Lindsey; Magness	3:33
10.	"The Best Was Yet to Come"	Bryan Adams; Jim Vallance	Branigan; Lindsey	3:21

=== Notes ===
- ^{^[a]} signifies a co-producer

== Personnel ==
Credits adapted from the liner notes of Laura Branigan.

=== Musicians ===
- Laura Branigan – lead vocals (all tracks); background vocals (tracks 1, 5); arrangements (track 10)
- Howie Rice – drum programming, keyboards (tracks 1, 2); guitar (track 1); synth guitar, percussion (track 2)
- Andy Goldmark – drum programming, keyboards, background vocals (track 1)
- Steve Kipner – drum programming (tracks 1, 2)
- Michael Dunlap – bass (track 1); keyboards (track 2)
- Steve Lindsey – keyboards (tracks 1, 2, 4–6, 9); drum programming (tracks 4, 6, 10); synth strings, arrangements (track 6); synthesizer (track 10)
- James Harrah – lead guitar (track 1); guitar (tracks 4–6, 9)
- Ramsey Embick – synth sax solo (track 1); keyboards, percussion (track 2)
- Richard Perry – drum programming (track 2)
- Alfie Silas – background vocals (tracks 2, 3, 6, 8)
- Peggi Blu – background vocals (tracks 2, 6, 9)
- Jean Johnson – background vocals (track 2)
- Peter Wolf – arrangements, all instruments except guitars (tracks 3, 8)
- Peter Maunu – guitars (tracks 3, 8)
- Ina Wolf – background vocals (tracks 3, 8)
- Maxi Anderson – background vocals (tracks 3, 8)
- Joe Pizzulo – background vocals (tracks 3, 8)
- Phillip Ingram – background vocals (tracks 3, 8)
- Dorian Holley – background vocals (tracks 3, 8)
- Clif Magness – keyboards, drum programming (tracks 4, 9); guitar (track 9)
- Steve Goldstein – keyboards (track 4); drum programming (track 10)
- Brandon Fields – sax (track 4)
- Kate Markowitz – background vocals (tracks 4, 5)
- Donna de Lory – background vocals (tracks 4, 5)
- Jeff Porcaro – drums (track 5)
- Dennis Matkosky – drum programming, keyboards, arrangements (track 5)
- Larry Klein – bass (tracks 5, 10)
- Brenda Russell – background vocals (track 5)
- Danny Peck – background vocals (track 5)
- Bill Champlin – background vocals (track 5)
- Leslie Hall – background vocals (track 5)
- Khris Kellow – drum programming, synth strings, keyboards, arrangements (track 6)
- John Robinson – hi-hat (track 6)
- Aaron Zigman – synth strings, keyboards (track 6)
- Paulinho da Costa – percussion (tracks 6, 9, 10)
- Lenny Castro – percussion (track 6)
- Mona Lisa Young – background vocals (tracks 6, 9)
- Peter Bunetta – arrangements, drum programming, percussion programming, background vocals (track 7)
- Rick Chudacoff – arrangements, keyboards (track 7)
- Robbie Buchanan – keyboards (track 7)
- Dann Huff – guitar (track 7)
- Leslie Smith – background vocals (track 7)
- Joey Diggs – background vocals (track 7)
- Ivory Stone – background vocals (track 7)
- Patti Henley – background vocals (track 7)
- Michael Williams – background vocals (track 7)
- Greg Phillinganes – keyboards (track 9)
- Francine Howard – background vocals (track 9)
- Bernadette Barlow – background vocals (track 9)
- Randy Kerber – piano (track 10)
- The Pasadena Boys Choir – background vocals (track 10)
- John Barron – choir direction (track 10)

=== Technical ===
- Richard Perry – production (tracks 1, 2, 4)
- Peter Wolf – production (tracks 3, 8)
- Laura Branigan – production (tracks 5, 6, 10)
- Steve Lindsey – production (tracks 5, 6, 9, 10); co-production (track 4)
- Dennis Matkosky – production, engineering assistance (track 5)
- Peter Bunetta – production (track 7)
- Rick Chudacoff – production (track 7)
- Steve Kipner – production (track 9)
- Clif Magness – production, engineering (track 9)
- Julie Larson – production coordination (tracks 1, 2, 4, 6, 9)
- Ramsey Embick – engineering (tracks 1, 2)
- Gabe Veltri – engineering (tracks 1, 5, 6, 10)
- Norman (Slam) Whitfield Jr. – engineering (tracks 1, 2); mixing (track 2)
- Jess Sutcliffe – engineering (tracks 1, 5, 6, 9, 10)
- Paul Ericksen – engineering (tracks 1–6, 8–10); mixing (tracks 3, 5, 8, 10)
- Andy Batwinas – engineering assistance (track 1)
- Eric Anest – engineering assistance (tracks 1, 2, 6, 9, 10); engineering (track 4)
- Bill Molina – engineering assistance (track 1)
- Richard Engstrom – engineering assistance (tracks 1, 2, 4, 9)
- Keith Cohen – mixing (track 1)
- Martin Schmelzel – engineering (track 2)
- David Schober – engineering (track 2)
- Ric Butz – engineering assistance (track 2)
- Carlos Golliher – production coordination (tracks 3, 8)
- Richard Cottrell – engineering (track 4)
- Charlie Pollard – engineering assistance (tracks 4, 6)
- John Karpowich – engineering assistance (tracks 4, 10)
- Alan Meyerson – mixing (tracks 4, 6)
- Guy DeFazio – engineering assistance (track 5)
- Van Coppock – engineering assistance (track 5)
- Charlie Brocco – engineering assistance (tracks 5, 9)
- Susanne Marie Edgren – production coordination (track 5)
- Mike Kloster – engineering assistance (track 6)
- Leon Johnson – recording, engineering (track 7)
- Marnie Riley – engineering assistance (track 7)
- Bryan Arnett – engineering assistance (track 7)
- Russ Ragsdale – engineering assistance (track 7)
- Steve Egelman – engineering assistance (track 7)
- Peter Barker – engineering (track 9)
- Ken Felton – engineering assistance (track 9)
- Robert Hart – engineering assistance (tracks 9, 10)
- Humberto Gatica – mixing (track 9)
- Gabe Moffat – engineering assistance (track 10)
- Gail Esposito – production coordination (track 10)
- Stephen Marcussen – mastering at Precision Lacquer (Hollywood, California)
- Doug Morris – executive production

=== Artwork ===
- Bob Defrin – art direction
- Greg Gorman – photography

== Charts ==
Chart performance for Laura Branigan
Chart (1990)	Peak position
Australian Albums (ARIA)	143
Dutch Albums (Album Top 100)	86
US Billboard 200	133
US Cash Box Top 200 Albums	137
