= Never in a Million Years (Laura Branigan song) =

Single by Laura Branigan

from the album Laura Branigan
- B-side: "Smoke Screen"
- Released: 1990
- Genre: Pop
- Length: 4:08
- Label: Atlantic
- Songwriters: Van Stephenson; Dave Robbins; Bob Farrell
- Producer: Peter Wolf

Laura Branigan singles chronology
"Moonlight on Water" (1990)	"Never in a Million Years" (1990)	"Turn the Beat Around" (1990)

"Never in a Million Years" is a song by the American pop singer Laura Branigan, which was released in 1990 by Atlantic Records as the second single from her sixth studio album Laura Branigan. It was written by Van Stephenson, Dave Robbins and Bob Farrell, and produced by Peter Wolf. "Never in a Million Years" was released in the United States as a cassette single and on promotional CD. It reached No. 22 on the US Billboard Adult Contemporary chart. There was no music video made for the song.

In 1991, American singer Vicki Shepard released her own version of the song, which Billboard described as a "bright, disco-fied rendition".

== Critical reception ==
Upon release, Billboard commented: "After a pair of dance-oriented singles, Branigan applies her acrobatic vocal style to a formulaic, but engaging, power ballad." In a review of Laura Branigan, The Clarion-Ledger described the song as a "weepy ballad", adding it was a "probable successor" to Branigan's previous single "Moonlight on Water". The Chicago Tribune described the song as an "understated ballad". People stated: "While Branigan tends toward the histrionic, her slower-tempo tunes - especially "Never in a Million Years" - make for effective pace changers amidst all the belting." Teen Ink said: "The few ballads present are disappointing, though Laura does breath life into 'Never in a Million Years'.

== Track listing ==
Cassette single

1. "Never in a Million Years" - 4:10
2. "Smoke Screen" - 4:08

CD single (US promo)

1. "Never in a Million Years" - 4:08

== Chart performance ==
Chart (1990)	Peak position
US Adult Contemporary (Billboard)	22
US Adult Contemporary (Gavin Report)	15
US Adult Contemporary (Radio & Records)	17
Quebec (ADISQ)	45

== Personnel ==
Never in a Million Years

- Laura Branigan - lead vocals
- Peter Wolf - instruments, producer, arranger
- Peter Maunu - guitar
- Alfie Silas, Dorian Holley, Ina Wolf, Joe Pizzulo, Maxi Anderson, Phillip Ingram - backing vocals
- Paul Ericksen - engineer, mixing
- Stephen Marcussen - mastering
- Carlos Golliher - coordinator
- Doug Morris - executive producer

Smoke Screen

- Laura Branigan - lead vocals
- Clif Magness - keyboards, drum programming
- Steve Goldstein - keyboards
- Steve Lindsey - keyboards, drum programming, co-producer
- James Harrah - guitar
- Brandon Fields - saxophone
- Donna De Lory, Kate Markowitz - backing vocals
- Richard Perry - producer
- Alan Meyerson - mixing
- Eric Anest, Paul Ericksen, Richard Cottrell - engineers
- Charlie Pollard, John Karpowich, Richard Engstrom - assistant engineers
- Stephen Marcussen - mastering
- Julie Larson - coordinator
- Doug Morris - executive producer
