= Jude Johnstone =

American singer-songwriter

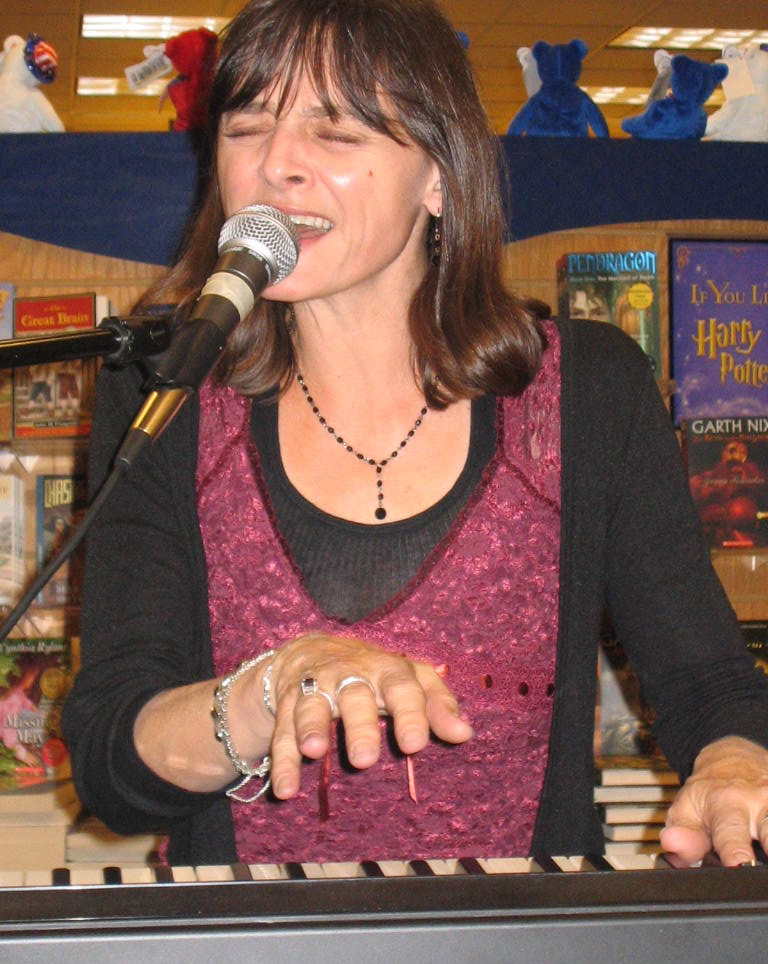
- Johnstone performing in 2005

Background information
- Born: Ellsworth, Maine, U.S.
- Genres: Americana; jazz; folk
- Occupation: Singer-songwriter
- Instruments: Vocals; piano
- Years active: 1979–present
- Label: BoJak
- Website: bojakrecords.com

Jude Johnstone is an American singer-songwriter. Her songs have been covered by Laura Branigan, Trisha Yearwood, Emmylou Harris, Bonnie Raitt, Bette Midler, Johnny Cash, Stevie Nicks, Mary Black, and others. Johnstone wrote the No. 1 song "The Woman Before Me" on Yearwood's debut CD, which also won an award from Broadcast Music Incorporated. In 1997, Johnny Cash won the Country Album of the Year Grammy for American II: Unchained for which Johnstone wrote the title track. BoJak Records was created by her manager, Bob Burton, in 2002 to release her debut CD Coming of Age, followed by the 2005 release of On a Good Day, Blue Light in 2007, Mr. Sun in 2008, Quiet Girl in 2011, Shatter in 2013, A Woman's Work in 2016, and Living Room in 2019. She lives in Nashville, Tennessee.

== Discography ==
- Coming of Age (2002)
- On a Good Day (2005)
- Blue Light (2007)
- Mr. Sun (2008)
- Quiet Girl (2011)
- Shatter (2013)
- A Woman's Work (2016)
- Living Room (2019)

== Song credits ==
- Rebecca Newton – "Quiet Girl" – Blue Shirt (2019)
- Neilson Hubbard – "My Heart Belongs to You" – Cumberland Island, 2018 (co-written with Neilson Hubbard and Ben Glover)
- Mary Black – "Wounded Heart" – By The Time It Gets Dark (30th Anniversary edition), 2017
- Bavarian Brass – "Hearts in Armor" – Jubiläum 20 Jahre, 2015
- Trisha Yearwood – "The Woman Before Me" – ICON 2, 2014
- Trisha Yearwood – "The Nightingale" and "When We Were Still in Love" – Ballads, 2013
- Stephen Bishop – "My Little Waterloo" – Romance in Rio, 2009, (iTunes bonus track)
- Emmylou Harris – "Hold On" – All I Intended To Be, 2008
- Bonnie Raitt – "Wounded Heart" – Silver Lining, 2006
- Johnny Cash – "Unchained" – The Legend of Johnny Cash, Vol. II, 2006
- Trisha Yearwood – "When We Were Still in Love" – Inside Out, 2001
- Jennifer Warnes – "The Nightingale" – The Well, 2001
- Bette Midler – "The Girl is on to You" – 3 For One, 2000
- Trisha Yearwood - "Good Guy" - AT&T Presents...Stormy Weather, 1998
- Johnny Cash/Willie Nelson – "Unchained"–VH1 Storytellers, 1998
- Johnny Cash – "Unchained" – Unchained – 1997 Grammy Country Album of the Year
- Trisha Yearwood – "The Woman Before Me" – Songbook, 1997
- Trisha Yearwood – "The Nightingale" – The Song Remembers When, 1993
- Trisha Yearwood – "Hearts in Armor" – Hearts in Armor, 1992
- Trisha Yearwood – "The Woman Before Me" – Trisha Yearwood, 1990
- Bette Midler – "The Girl Is On To You" – Some People's Lives, 1990
- Stevie Nicks – "Cry Wolf" – The Other Side of the Mirror, 1989
- Laura Branigan – "Cry Wolf" – Touch, 1987
- Clarence Clemons – "I Cross the Line" – Hero, 1985
- Lifetime/ABC Television's Army Wives – "Wounded Heart”
- Lifetime/ABC Television's Army Wives – "The Nightingale”
- Lifetime/ABC Television's Army Wives – "In This House”
- Lifetime/ABC Television's Army Wives – "The Hereafter”
- Showtime Television's Nurse Jackie – "Mr. Sun”
- Fox Television's Lie To Me – "Unchained"

== Awards ==
- 1992 Radio & Records No. 1 Song "The Woman Before Me”
- 1993 BMI Songwriters Award "The Woman Before Me”
- 1997 Grammy Country Album of The Year – Johnny Cash – Unchained
- 2008 winner of the 8th annual Independent Music Awards Vox Pop vote for best Film/TV song in a dramatic series "In This House.”
- 2012 1st prize winner of the 10th annual IAMA for best Americana/Roots song "Quiet Girl."
