= Cry Wolf (Laura Branigan song) =

Single by Laura Branigan

from the album Touch
- B-side: "Whatever I Do (Wherever I Go)" (NA); "Touch" (EU)
- Released: 1988
- Studio: Powertrax, Hollywood, California
- Genre: Pop rock
- Length: 4:48
- Label: Atlantic
- Songwriter: Jude Johnstone
- Producer: David Kershenbaum

Laura Branigan singles chronology
"Power of Love" (1987)	"Cry Wolf" (1988)	"The Name Game" (1988)

Music video
- "Cry Wolf" on YouTube

"Cry Wolf" is a song by American singer Laura Branigan, released as the third single from her fifth studio album, Touch (1987). It was written by singer-songwriter Jude Johnstone, who later recorded the song herself for her 2002 debut album. Stevie Nicks recorded a cover in 1989 for her fourth solo studio album, The Other Side of the Mirror.

== Track listings ==
7-inch single / cassette single
No.	Title	Length
1.	"Cry Wolf"	4:48
2.	"Whatever I Do"	3:59

European 7-inch single
No.	Title	Length
1.	"Cry Wolf"	4:48
2.	"Touch"	4:09

== Credits and personnel ==
Credits adapted from the liner notes of Touch.

- Laura Branigan – vocals
- David Kershenbaum – production
- Bob Marlette – arrangements, keyboards, guitars, string arrangements, drum programming
- Carlos Vega – drums
- John Nelson – guitars
- Kim Scharnberg – string arrangements, conducting
- Kenneth G. Kugler – copyist
- Julie Ann Gigante, Ralph D. Morrison III, Clayton Haslop, Alexander Horvath, R.F. Peterson, Arthur Zadinsky, Michael Nowak, Raymond J. Tischer II, Margot MacLaine, Armen Ksjikian, Dennis Karmazyn, Michael Matthews – strings
- David J. Holman – engineering, mixing, PPG programming

== Charts ==
Chart (1988)	Peak position
Australia (Kent Music Report)	98

== Cover versions ==
- 1989: Stevie Nicks was the first to cover the song and it was featured on her album The Other Side of the Mirror.
- 1992: Anne Haigis covered the song as the title track to her eighth studio album.
- 2002: Jude Johnstone, the writer of the song, recorded it herself for her debut album Coming of Age.
