= Moonlight on Water =

1989 song by Steve Kipner

Single by Kevin Raleigh

from the album Delusions of Grandeur
- B-side: "The Art of War"
- Released: 1989
- Genre: Pop
- Length: 4:10
- Label: Atlantic
- Songwriters: Steve Kipner; Andy Goldmark
- Producer: Peter Coleman

"Moonlight on Water", also known as "Moonlight on Water (Sex on the Beach)", is a popular song written and composed by Steve Kipner, best known for writing Olivia Newton-John's "Physical", and Andy Goldmark. The song was originally recorded by Kevin Raleigh for his 1989 album Delusions of Grandeur and was released as a single. It reached No. 60 on the U.S. Billboard Hot 100 singles chart on 24 June 1989.

== Charts ==
Chart (1989)	Peak position
US Billboard Hot 100	60

== Laura Branigan version ==
"Moonlight on Water"

Single by Laura Branigan

from the album Laura Branigan
- B-side: "Reverse Psychology"
- Released: 1990
- Recorded: 1989
- Length: 4:39
- Label: Atlantic
- Songwriters: Steve Kipner; Andy Goldmark
- Producer: Richard Perry

Laura Branigan singles chronology
"Come into My Life" (1988)	"Moonlight on Water" (1990)	"Never in a Million Years" (1990)

Music video
- "Moonlight on Water" on YouTube

The song was covered by Laura Branigan and was the first single taken from the self-titled album that she released in 1990. Her version was produced by Richard Perry. However, it was only a minor hit in the United States (reaching No. 59, one spot higher than Kevin Raleigh's version), where a music video for the song received little airplay. Branigan can be seen performing the song on her second videocassette and laserdisc concert release, Laura Branigan in Concert, which was filmed in 1990 at a tour stop in Atlantic City and initially televised as part of the syndicated TV series SRO: In Concert.

=== Critical reception ===
Bill Coleman from Billboard wrote, "Previewing the booming-voiced diva's new self-titled album is a sinfully fun popper reminiscent of earlier chart glories. Can't wait for the club remixes."

=== Track listings ===
CD single
No.	Title	Length
1.	"Moonlight on Water" (Radio edit)	3:54
2.	"Moonlight on Water"	4:39

CD single (Japan)
No.	Title	Length
1.	"Moonlight on Water"	4:39
2.	"Reverse Psychology"	3:33

12" single
No.	Title	Length
1.	"Moonlight on Water" (12" mix)	7:55
2.	"Moonlight on Water" (Sex on the Beach Dub)	5:52
3.	"Moonlight on Water" (Radio remix)	4:05

=== Charts ===
Chart (1990)	Peak position
Australia (ARIA)	159
Finland (Suomen virallinen singlelista)	29
US Billboard Hot 100	59
US Hot Dance Club Play (Billboard)	44
US Cash Box Top 100 Singles	58
