= Self Control (album) =

1984 studio album by Laura Branigan

Studio album by Laura Branigan
- Released: April 1, 1984
- Studios: Image Recording (Los Angeles, California); Music Grinder (Los Angeles, California); Arco (Munich, West Germany)
- Length: 40:01
- Label: Atlantic
- Producers: Jack White; Robbie Buchanan

Laura Branigan chronology
Branigan 2 (1983)	Self Control (1984)	Hold Me (1985)

Singles from Self Control
- 1. "Self Control" Released: April 19, 1984; 2. "The Lucky One" Released: July 2, 1984; 3. "Ti Amo" Released: October 1984; 4. "Satisfaction" Released: November 1984; 5. "With Every Beat of My Heart" Released: 1984

Professional ratings
Review scores
Source	Rating
AllMusic	3/5 stars

Self Control is the third studio album by American singer Laura Branigan, released on April 1, 1984, by Atlantic Records. The album peaked at number 23 on the US Billboard 200 and has been certified platinum by the Recording Industry Association of America (RIAA). Internationally, it charted within the top five in several continental European countries.

Four singles were released from the album, including Branigan's cover version of Raf's "Self Control", which was a commercial success, peaking at number four on the US Billboard Hot 100 and topping the charts in Canada and several European countries. Additionally, "The Lucky One" peaked at number 20 on the Billboard Hot 100, while her cover of Umberto Tozzi's "Ti amo" reached number two in Australia and number five in Canada.

A remastered and expanded edition of Self Control was released on April 25, 2013, by Gold Legion, including remixes of "The Lucky One" and "Satisfaction", as well as the extended version of "Self Control".

== Reception ==
In their review of the album, Billboard commended the album as "a superbly balanced set of powerful rhythm pieces and big, torchy ballads. The stand-out in the latter category is a heartfelt version of the Carole King classic 'Will You Still Love Me Tomorrow.' Several of the songs were translated from French into English, and have the continental flair that characterized Branigan's top 10 hits 'Gloria' and 'Solitaire.'"

Cashbox called it a "marvelously textured album" noting that "with the imminent success of the slow-grooving title track single, the album is sure to take hold of the public’s heart...this disc provides the powerful voiced songstress the variety of melody needed to show off her superior interpretive voice."

AllMusic noted that "Laura Branigan's third album capitalized on the Euro-dance-pop and affecting ballads that made her an international star while allowing her to grow as a vocalist. Her collections, always uneven in terms of material, benefit mostly from her stellar voice, and this is no exception. 'The Lucky One' and 'Heart' start slow and build to a crescendo, perfectly showcasing her range without being obvious. The title track, about finding sex in the seamy side of town, sparked a bit of a controversy, but ended up being her second biggest hit. The song itself works, but Branigan was never a sex bomb, so the fact that she pulls it off is indicative of her power as a performer. 'Ti Amo' is the album's theatrical ballad, which works well with breathy, dramatic vocals. She even pulls off a graceful cover of 'Will You Still Love Me Tomorrow' that is clear and simple."

== Track listing ==
Side one
No.	Title	Lyrics	Music	Length
1.	"The Lucky One"	Bruce Roberts	Roberts	4:10
2.	"Self Control"	Steve Piccolo	Giancarlo Bigazzi; Raffaele Riefoli	4:08
3.	"Ti Amo"	Diane Warren^{[a]}	Bigazzi; Tozzi	4:18
4.	"Heart"	Marie Cain	Warren Hartman	4:08
5.	"Will You Still Love Me Tomorrow"	Gerry Goffin	Carole King	3:26

Side two
No.	Title	Lyrics	Music	Length
6.	"Satisfaction"	Mark Spiro; Warren	Bernd Dietrich; Gerd Grabowski; Engelbert Simons	3:56
7.	"Silent Partners"	Warren; The Doctor	Warren; The Doctor	4:10
8.	"Breaking Out"	Warren; The Doctor	Warren; The Doctor	3:50
9.	"Take Me"	John Parker; Steve Kipner	Parker; Kipner	3:43
10.	"With Every Beat of My Heart"	Bob Mitchell; Jamie Kaleth	Bob Mitchell; Jamie Kaleth	4:12
Total length:				40:01

2013 expanded edition bonus tracks
No.	Title	Lyrics	Music	Length
11.	"The Lucky One" (John Robie Mix)	Roberts	Roberts	5:23
12.	"The Lucky One" (Jack White Mix)	Roberts	Roberts	5:04
13.	"Self Control" (12″ Version)	Piccolo	Bigazzi; Riefoli	5:00
14.	"Satisfaction" (Special Dance Mix)	Spiro; Warren	Dietrich; Grabowski; Simons	5:56
Total length:				61:24

2020 expanded edition bonus disc
No.	Title	Writer(s)	Length
1.	"Self Control" (Extended Version)	Piccolo; Bigazzi; Riefoli	5:06
2.	"Self Control" (Edit)	Piccolo; Bigazzi; Riefoli	3:57
3.	"Self Control" (Classic Summer Mix 1992)	Piccolo; Bigazzi; Riefoli	4:00
4.	"Self Control" (117 BPM Club 1992)	Piccolo; Bigazzi; Riefoli	4:56
5.	"The Lucky One" (Single Version)	Roberts	3:12
6.	"The Lucky One" (Jack White Mix)	Roberts	5:08
7.	"The Lucky One" (John Robie Mix)	Roberts	5:27
8.	"Satisfaction" (Single Version)	Warren; Dietrich; Simons; Grabowski; Spiro	3:41
9.	"Satisfaction" (Special Dance Mix)	Warren; Dietrich; Simons; Grabowski; Spiro	5:58
10.	"When" (Single Version)	Laura Branigan	2:44
11.	"Hot Night" (from the Ghostbusters soundtrack)	Warren; Steve Angelica	3:20
Total length:			47:29

=== Notes ===
- ^{^[a]} signifies English lyrics

== Personnel ==
Credits adapted from the liner notes of Self Control.

=== Musicians ===
- Laura Branigan – vocals
- Carlos Vega – drums
- John Robinson – drums
- Michael Landau – guitar
- Dann Huff – guitar
- Paul Jackson Jr. – guitar
- Nathan East – bass
- Robbie Buchanan – pianos, synthesizers (all tracks); arrangements (tracks 3, 5, 7–9)
- Harold Faltermeyer – additional synthesizers (all tracks); arrangements (tracks 1, 2, 4, 6, 10)
- Larry O. Williams – saxophone (track 9)
- Thomas Kelly – background vocals
- Steve George – background vocals
- Bill Champlin – background vocals
- Richard Page – background vocals
- Tommy Funderburk – background vocals
- Jon Joyce – background vocals
- Jim Haas – background vocals
- Joe Chemay – background vocals
- Beth Anderson – background vocals
- Joe Pizzulo – background vocals

=== Technical ===
- Jürgen Koppers – engineering, mixing (Note: Mixed at Paradise Studio (Munich, West Germany) and Westlake Studios (Los Angeles, California))
- Harold Faltermeyer – additional engineering
- Peter Luedemann – additional engineering
- Jeremy Smith – additional engineering
- Gary Skardina – additional engineering
- Keith Buckley – engineering assistance
- Jon Ingoldsby – engineering assistance
- Matt Forger – engineering assistance
- Brian Gardner – mastering (Note: Mastered at Allen Zentz Mastering (Hollywood, California))
- Jack White – production, executive production
- Robbie Buchanan – production

=== Artwork ===
- Tim Lohman – front cover photo
- Paul Lohman – creative direction
- Bob Defrin – art direction
- Lynn Dreese Breslin – design
- Daniela Scaramuzza – back cover photo

== Charts ==
=== Weekly charts ===
Weekly chart performance for Self Control
Chart (1984)	Peak position
Australian Albums (Kent Music Report)	29
Austrian Albums (Ö3 Austria)	16
Canada Top Albums/CDs (RPM)	12
Dutch Albums (Album Top 100)	48
European Albums (Eurotipsheet)	16
Finnish Albums (Suomen virallinen lista)	2
German Albums (Offizielle Top 100)	5
New Zealand Albums (RMNZ)	38
Norwegian Albums (VG-lista)	3
Swedish Albums (Sverigetopplistan)	5
Swiss Albums (Schweizer Hitparade)	2
UK Albums (Official Charts)	16
US Billboard 200	23
US Cash Box Top 200 Albums	24

2020 chart performance for Self Control - Expanded Edition
Chart (2020)	Position
UK Independent Albums (Official Charts)	35
Scottish Albums (Official Charts)	100

=== Year-end charts ===
1984 year-end chart performance for Self Control
Chart (1984)	Position
Canada Top Albums/CDs (RPM)	37
German Albums (Offizielle Top 100)	41
Norwegian Fall Period Albums (VG-lista)	10
Swiss Albums (Schweizer Hitparade)	12
US Billboard 200	49

1985 year-end chart performance for Self Control
Chart (1985)	Position
Canada Top Albums/CDs (RPM)	79

== Certifications ==
Certifications for Self Control
Region	Certification	Certified units/sales
Canada (Music Canada)	Platinum	100,000^{^}
Finland (Musiikkituottajat)	Gold	32,476
Germany (BVMI)	Gold	250,000^{^}
Hong Kong (IFPI Hong Kong)	Gold	10,000^{*}
United Kingdom (BPI)	Silver	60,000^{^}
United States (RIAA)	Platinum	1,000,000^{^}
^{*} Sales figures based on certification alone.^{^} Shipments figures based on certification alone.
