= Satisfaction (Laura Branigan song) =

1984 single by Laura Branigan

Single by Laura Branigan

from the album Self Control
- B-side: "If You Loved Me"
- Released: November 1984
- Genre: Eurodisco
- Length: 3:40
- Label: Atlantic
- Composers: Bernd Dietrich; Gerd Grabowski; Engelbert Simons
- Lyricists: Mark Spiro; Diane Warren
- Producers: Jack White; Robbie Buchanan

Laura Branigan singles chronology
"Ti Amo" (1984)	"Satisfaction" (1984)	"Spanish Eddie" (1985)

"Satisfaction" is a song by American singer Laura Branigan, released as the fourth and final single from her third studio album, Self Control (1984). The song's music was written by Bernd Dietrich, Gerd Grabowski and Engelbert Simons, and the English lyrics were written by Mark Spiro and Diane Warren. It was produced by Jack White and Robbie Buchanan.

== Release ==
"Satisfaction" was released as a single in November 1984 in both Europe and the US. Unlike Europe, it did not receive a full commercial release in the US, but was issued on 12-inch vinyl for the benefit of the dance club scene. The song had been attracting club play and album play as early as August 1984. A commercial release was not necessary as "Ti Amo", another track from Self Control, was given such a release in the US in October 1984 for the top 40 market and pop radio. "Satisfaction" peaked at number 24 on Billboard's Hot Dance/Disco chart in January 1985.

== Critical reception ==
Upon its release as a single, Billboard described "Satisfaction" as a "disco tune that's more straightforward and percussive than her concurrent pop charter 'Ti Amo'".

== Track listings ==
- 7-inch single (Europe)
1. "Satisfaction" – 3:40
2. "If You Loved Me" – 3:15
- 12-inch single (US)
1. "Satisfaction" (Vocal/Extended Version) – 5:56
2. "Ti Amo" (Vocal/LP Version) – 4:18
- 12-inch promotional single (US)
1. "Satisfaction" (Vocal/Extended Version) – 5:56
2. "Satisfaction" (Vocal/LP Version) – 3:56
- 12-inch single (Europe)
1. "Satisfaction" (Special Dance Mix) – 5:56
2. "If You Loved Me" – 3:15

== Personnel ==
Production

- Jack White – production ("Satisfaction", "If You Loved Me", "Ti Amo"), arrangement ("Satisfaction", "Ti Amo")
- Robbie Buchanan – production ("Satisfaction", "If You Loved Me", "Ti Amo"), arrangement ("Satisfaction", "Ti Amo")

== Charts ==
Chart performance for "Satisfaction"
Chart (1985)	Peak position
Ecuador (UPI)	2
Dutch Airplay Charts (Nederlandse Top 40)	5
Finland (Suomen virallinen lista)	29
UK Hi-NRG Disco Charts (Music Week)	22
US Dance Club Songs (Billboard)	24
