= The Lucky One (Laura Branigan song) =

Single by Laura Branigan

from the album Self Control
- B-side: "Breaking Out"; "Silent Partners"
- Released: July 2, 1984
- Recorded: 1983
- Genre: Synth-pop
- Length: 4:10
- Label: Atlantic
- Songwriter: Bruce Roberts
- Producers: Jack White; Robbie Buchanan

Laura Branigan singles chronology
"Self Control" (1984)	"The Lucky One" (1984)	"Ti Amo" (1984)

Music video
- "The Lucky One" on YouTube

"The Lucky One" is a song by American singer Laura Branigan from her third studio album, Self Control (1984). It was released on July 2, 1984, as the album's second single. The song peaked at number 20 on the Billboard Hot 100, becoming Branigan's fifth top-20 entry.

Branigan's performance of "The Lucky One" won the Grand Prix award at the Tokyo Music Festival held April 1, 1984; the prize was three million yen ($13,400).

The song was used as the theme for the 1983 television film An Uncommon Love. In 2000, Australian-born Irish singer Johnny Logan released a cover version as the third and final single from his album Love Is All (1999).

== Music video ==
The music video for "The Lucky One" was directed by Michael Heldman and filmed in Montecito, California. The video depicts Branigan as a gas station attendant who dreams she is brought to a lavish country manor, where she receives instruction in how to display a polished deportment.

== Track listings ==
7" single
No.	Title	Length
1.	"The Lucky One"	4:10
2.	"Breaking Out"	3:50

7" single (Japan)
No.	Title	Length
1.	"The Lucky One"	4:10
2.	"Silent Partners"	4:06

12" single
No.	Title	Length
1.	"The Lucky One" (Jack White mix)	5:04
2.	"Breaking Out"	3:50

12" single (Europe)
No.	Title	Length
1.	"The Lucky One" (Jack White mix)	5:04
2.	"The Lucky One" (John Robie mix)	5:25
3.	"Breaking Out"	3:50

== Charts ==
Chart (1984)	Peak position
Australia (Kent Music Report)	48
Canada Top Singles (RPM)	53
Canada Adult Contemporary (RPM)	6
Europe (European Top 100 Singles)	37
European Airplay (European Hit Radio)	35
France (SNEP)	27
Ireland (IRMA)	29
Israel (Israeli Singles Chart)	12
Netherlands (Tipparade)	9
Quebec (ADISQ)	22
Switzerland (Schweizer Hitparade)	21
UK Singles (Official Charts)	56
UK Hi-NRG Disco Chart (Record Mirror)	27
US Billboard Hot 100	20
US Adult Contemporary (Billboard)	13
US Dance Club Songs (Billboard)	10
US Cash Box Top 100 Singles	22
West Germany (GfK)	33
