= Ti amo =

1977 single by Umberto Tozzi

- 2002 CD cover with Umberto Tozzi and Lena Ka

Single by Umberto Tozzi

from the album È nell'aria...ti amo
- B-side: "Dimentica, dimentica" (original version), "Ti amo" (duet version)
- Released: 1977 (original version); 2002 (duet version)
- Recorded: 1977
- Genre: Pop
- Length: 4:10 (original), 3:56 (duet)
- Label: CBS, Warner Music
- Songwriters: Giancarlo Bigazzi, Umberto Tozzi
- Producer: Giancarlo Bigazzi

Umberto Tozzi singles chronology
"Ti amo" (1977)	"Toi, tù" (2003)

Music video
- "Ti amo" (audio) on YouTube

"Ti amo" (pronounced [ti ˈaːmo]; Italian for "I love you") is a 1977 song recorded by Italian singer Umberto Tozzi from the album È nell'aria...ti amo. It achieved success at the time, becoming a hit in many European countries, including Sweden and Switzerland where it topped the charts. A Spanish version was released as "Te Amo", and was very successful in Spain and Latin America. Within the German-speaking countries a German version by Howard Carpendale also enjoyed great success in 1977, peaking at number two in Germany and number ten in Austria.

A duet version of the song featuring Monica Bellucci was used for the 2002 film Asterix & Obelix: Mission Cleopatra, and the English versions "I Love You (Ti Amo)" and "You and I (Ti Amo)" were also released. In 2002, the song was overdubbed as duet with singer Lena Ka under the title "Ti amo (rien que des mots)", with Italian and French lyrics. This version was a success in France and Belgium (Wallonia), reaching the top three. At the time, the original version was re-released and achieved a moderate success in France. As of August 2014, it is the 52nd best-selling single of the 21st century in France, with 393,000 units sold. A French version of this song was recorded by Dalida in 1977. An English version was also recorded by Laura Branigan in 1984, which, most notably, was a hit in Australia (reaching No. 2). In 2011, Sergio Dalma took a Spanish-language version of the song to the Top 10 in Spain. In 2017, to celebrate the 40 year anniversary of the song, Tozzi released an Italian-English version and music video featuring Anastacia.

== Background ==
Ti amo was written by Tozzi and Giancarlo Bigazzi and produced by Bigazzi. It is about a blue-collar worker whose job has taken him away from his home and his wife. As he is about to return for Labor Day (May 1), he says goodbye to his lover, confessing that he is torn between her and his wife. Reunited with his wife, he realized how much he has missed her and asks her to forgive him his infidelity.

== Track listings ==
- 1977 version

7" single

1. "Ti amo" – 4:07
2. "Dimentica, dimentica" – 4:10

Spain 7" single

1. "Te amo" (Bigazzi/Tozzi/Spanish lyrics by Carlos Toro & Oscar Gómez) – 4:06
2. "Olvidate olvidate" – 4:15
- 1978 version

UK 7" single

1. "I Love You (Ti Amo)" (Bigazzi/Tozzi/English lyrics by Fred Jay) – 3:59
2. "Dimentica, Dimentica" – 4:10

UK 7" single

1. "Ti Amo" (Italian version) – 4:08
2. "Ti Amo" (English version) (Bigazzi/Tozzi/English lyrics by Fred Jay) – 4:08
- 1995 version

German CD single

1. "You and I (Ti Amo)" (Bigazzi/Tozzi/English lyrics by Betsy Cook) – 4:15
2. "Ti Amo" – 4:12
3. "Donna Amante Mia" – 4:55
- 2002 version

France CD single

1. "Ti amo (Rien que des mots)" (Bigazzi/Tozzi/French lyrics by Bruno Berrebi) – 3:56
2. "Ti amo" – 4:05
- 2017 version

Digital single

1. "Ti amo" (Bigazzi/Tozzi/English lyrics by Diane Warren) – 4:36

== Charts ==
=== Original version ===
==== Weekly charts ====
1977–78 weekly chart performance for "Ti amo"
Chart (1977–78)	Peak position
Australia (Kent Music Report)	25
Austria (Ö3 Austria Top 40)	3
Belgium (Ultratop 50 Flanders)	4
France (IFOP)	1
Greece (Pop & Rock)	1
Italy (Musica e dischi)	1
Netherlands (Dutch Top 40)	15
Netherlands (Single Top 100)	15
Norway (VG-lista)	3
Sweden (Sverigetopplistan)	1
Switzerland (Schweizer Hitparade)	1
West Germany (GfK)	4

2002–20 weekly chart performance for "Ti amo"
Chart (2002–20)	Peak position
France (SNEP)	39
Italy (FIMI)	78
Spain (Promusicae)	44

==== Year-end charts ====
1977 year-end chart performance for "Ti amo"
Chart (1977)	Position
Austria (Ö3 Austria Top 40)	16
Switzerland (Schweizer Hitparade)	3

1978 year-end chart performance for "Ti amo"
Chart (1978)	Position
Belgium (Ultratop 50 Flanders)	42

=== Duet version ===
==== Weekly charts ====
2002 weekly chart performance for "Ti amo (Rien que des mots)"
Chart (2002)	Peak position
Belgium (Ultratop 50 Wallonia)	2
France (SNEP)	3
Switzerland (Schweizer Hitparade)	10

==== Year-end charts ====
2002 year-end chart performance for "Ti amo (Rien que des mots)"
Chart (2002)	Position
Belgium (Ultratop 50 Wallonia)	4
Europe (Eurochart Hot 100)	32
France (SNEP)	7

== Certifications and sales ==
Region	Certification	Certified units/sales
Australia (ARIA)	Gold	35,000^{^}
Belgium (BRMA) 2002 release	Platinum	50,000^{*}
France 1977 release	—	1,100,000
France (SNEP) 2002 release	Platinum	500,000^{*}
Italy	—	1,000,000
Italy (FIMI)	Platinum	100,000^{‡}
Greece	—	20,000
^{*} Sales figures based on certification alone.^{^} Shipments figures based on certification alone.^{‡} Sales+streaming figures based on certification alone.

== Laura Branigan version ==
"Ti Amo"

Single by Laura Branigan

from the album Self Control
- B-side: "Satisfaction"; "I'm Not the Only One"
- Released: 1984
- Recorded: 1984
- Genre: Pop
- Length: 4:18
- Label: Atlantic
- Songwriters: Giancarlo Bigazzi; Umberto Tozzi; Diane Warren
- Producers: Jack White; Robbie Buchanan

Laura Branigan singles chronology
"The Lucky One" (1984)	"Ti Amo" (1984)	"Satisfaction" (1984)

In 1984, American singer Laura Branigan covered "Ti Amo" for her third studio album, Self Control, with English lyrics written by Diane Warren. Her version was released as the album's third single, and was particularly successful in Australia and Canada, where it reached numbers two and five, respectively. Branigan would later perform her version of "Ti Amo" with Umberto Tozzi for a live Italian television show where Umberto played guitar.

=== Track listings ===
7" single
No.	Title	Length
1.	"Ti Amo"	4:18
2.	"Satisfaction"	3:56

12" single
No.	Title	Length
1.	"Ti Amo"	4:18
2.	"Satisfaction"	3:56
3.	"I'm Not the Only One"	3:22

=== Charts ===
==== Weekly charts ====
Weekly chart performance for "Ti Amo"
Chart (1984–92)	Peak position
Australia (Kent Music Report)	2
Canada Top Singles (RPM)	5
Canada Adult Contemporary (RPM)	5
Finland (Suomen virallinen lista)	18
New Zealand (Recorded Music NZ)	49
UK Singles (Official Charts)	100
US Billboard Hot 100	55
US Adult Contemporary (Billboard)	22
US Cash Box Top 100 Singles	54
South Africa (Springbok Radio)	22
Quebec (ADISQ)	14

==== Year-end charts ====
Year-end chart performance for "Ti Amo"
Chart (1985)	Position
Australia (Kent Music Report)	30
Canada Top Singles (RPM)	74

== Sergio Dalma version ==
"Te Amo"
- iTunes cover

Single by Sergio Dalma

from the album Via Dalma II
- Released: 2011
- Recorded: 2011
- Genre: Pop
- Length: 4:12
- Label: Warner Music
- Songwriters: Giancarlo Bigazzi, Umberto Tozzi, Oscar Gomez, Carlos Toro Montoro
- Producer: Claudio Guidetti

Sergio Dalma singles chronology
"El Mundo" (2011)	"Te Amo" (2011)	"Yo No Te Pido La Luna" (2012)

In 2011, popular Spanish singer Sergio Dalma included a version of the song on Via Dalma II, his second collection of Italian songs performed in Spanish. Issued as the second single from the disc, "Te Amo" rose to No. 10 on the official chart released by Productores de Música de España and spent 14 weeks on the chart. The iTunes edition of the single featured a duet version with Argentine-Spanish singer Chenoa as well as the original album version. The single was promoted with a black-and-white video clip in which Dalma performs the song dressed in a suit while interacting with an actress.

The song's parent album spent five weeks at No. 1 in Spain, achieving quadruple platinum status after spending 49 weeks on the chart.

=== Charts ===
==== Weekly charts ====
Chart (2011–2012)	Peak position
Spain (Promusicae)	10
