= Shattered Glass (song) =

Single by Laura Branigan

from the album Touch
- B-side: "Statue in the Rain"
- Released: June 5, 1987
- Recorded: 1987
- Studio: PWL, London
- Genre: Synth-pop; Hi-NRG; dance-pop
- Length: 3:40
- Label: Atlantic
- Songwriters: Bob Mitchell; Steve Coe
- Producer: Stock Aitken Waterman

Laura Branigan singles chronology
"I Found Someone" (1986)	"Shattered Glass" (1987)	"Power of Love" (1987)

Music video
- "Shattered Glass" on YouTube

"Shattered Glass" is a song written by Bob Mitchell and Steve Coe which was originally recorded in 1980 by Scottish singer Ellie Warren. The song was recorded in 1987 by American singer Laura Branigan with the Stock Aitken Waterman production team to serve as the lead single from Branigan's fifth studio album, Touch (1987). The cover was released on June 5 of the same year by Atlantic Records.

== Background ==
The song had originally been produced by Mitchell and Coe for Scottish singer Ellie Warren in 1980; Warren recalls "all the radio stations and media were totally behind 'Shattered Glass', but the record wasn't serviced properly. When the radio was playing it to death, you couldn't buy it in the shops – a ludicrous situation."

"Shattered Glass" was one of two tracks Branigan cut with the Stock Aitken Waterman team. Originally the Touch album was to totally be a collaboration with producer David Kershenbaum, but after completing her recording with Kershenbaum, Branigan, who was especially interested in scoring a strong successful single, as her previous album, Hold Me, had only spawned a mildly successful single in "Spanish Eddie" (number 40), made an overnight foray to England to record at the PWL Studios in London with Stock Aitken Waterman, at the time enjoying massive chart success with releases by such acts as Rick Astley, Bananarama and Dead or Alive. The session was marked by some conflict, with Branigan challenging the producers' usual recording style, by insisting on singing the whole song through and not simply looping any repeated lyrics, and clashing with Matt Aitken over his habit of smoking in the control room.

Branigan told Record Mirror in 1987, "[Waterman] told my record company that he had a great song for me. He sent it to me, I loved it, and a week later I flew to London to record it. Working with [Stock Aitken Waterman] is very different from anyone else. They're more like a factory; it's very mechanical." Besides "Shattered Glass", the PWL session produced Branigan's recording of "Whatever I Do", a Stock Aitken Waterman original previously recorded in 1984 by English singer Hazell Dean.

"Shattered Glass" was issued as a single in the US in June 1987 with "Statue in the Rain" – a song recorded for Touch with Kershenbaum and omitted from the vinyl version of the album to accommodate the inclusion of the Stock Aitken Waterman tracks – serving as the B-side; the 12″ single version of the track was remixed by Pete Hammond. The accompanying music video features Afa Anoaʻi, a wrestler known, with his brother, as one of The Wild Samoans.

Branigan's performance of "Shattered Glass" on the September 5, 1987, broadcast of American Bandstand, which was the show's final episode on ABC, marked the first time a song was promoted by a guest star on the major network edition of the show, but by the time of Branigan's American Bandstand appearance, the failure of "Shattered Glass" as a comeback vehicle for Branigan was evident, the single having stalled at number 48 on the Billboard Hot 100 that August. The single also reached number 13 on Billboard's Hot Dance/Disco Club Play chart and number 27 on the Hot Adult Contemporary chart. Internationally, "Shattered Glass" reached number 26 in Switzerland, number 43 in West Germany, and number 60 in Australia.

Bryan Buss of AllMusic would later write that, from an album that contained "so many [...] successfully evocative cuts [...] lead single 'Shattered Glass' [...] stand[s] out; you can hardly hold back from caroling along."

A remake of "Shattered Glass" by English singer Natalie Powers was released as a single in June 2009 on Liberty City Records. The song was also covered by Hazell Dean, who released it as a single in November 2012, including mixes produced by Matt Pop, Pete Ware, and Yisraelee.

== Track listings ==
7-inch single
No.	Title	Length
1.	"Shattered Glass"	3:40
2.	"Statue in the Rain"	4:16

12-inch single
No.	Title	Length
1.	"Shattered Glass" (vocal/12″ mix)	7:14
2.	"Shattered Glass" (vocal/LP version)	3:40
3.	"Statue in the Rain"	4:16

CD single (as part of 2015's Say I'm Your Number One: The Singles Box Set)
No.	Title	Length
1.	"Shattered Glass"	3:40
2.	"Whatever I Do"	4:01
3.	"Shattered Glass" (extended version)	7:14
4.	"Shattered Glass" (instrumental)	3:40

== Credits and personnel ==
Credits adapted from the liner notes of Touch.

- Laura Branigan – vocals
- Stock Aitken Waterman – production
- John O'Hara – keyboards
- Mike Stock – keyboards, Linn programming, background vocals
- Matt Aitken – keyboards, Linn programming, guitars
- A. Linn – drums
- Dee Lewis – background vocals
- Coral Gordon – background vocals
- Mark McGuire – engineering
- Peter Hammond – mixing

== Charts ==
Chart performance for "Shattered Glass"
Chart (1987)	Peak position
Australia (Kent Music Report)	60
Europe (European Hot 100 Singles)	89
South Africa (Springbok Radio)	29
Switzerland (Schweizer Hitparade)	26
UK Singles (OCC)	78
UK Dance (Music Week)	48
US Billboard Hot 100	48
US Adult Contemporary (Billboard)	27
US Dance Club Songs (Billboard)	13
US Dance Singles Sales (Billboard)	15
US Cash Box Top 100 Singles	51
West Germany (GfK)	43
