= Laura Branigan =

American singer (1952–2004)

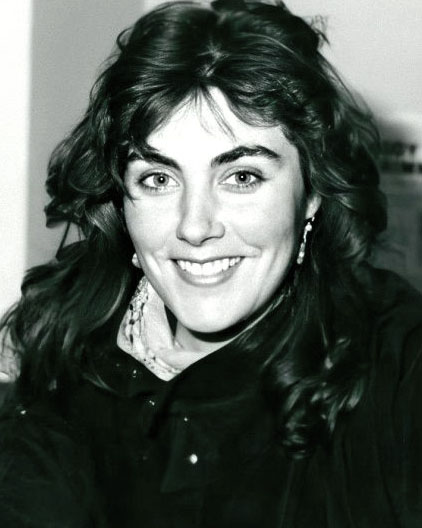
- Branigan c. 1982
- Born: Laura Ann Branigan; July 3, 1952; Mount Kisco, New York, U.S.
- Died: August 26, 2004 (aged 52); East Quogue, New York, U.S.
- Occupations: Singer; songwriter; actress
- Spouse: Lawrence Ross Kruteck (m. 1978; died 1996)
- Musical career
- Genres: Pop; dance; rock; disco
- Instruments: Vocals; piano
- Works: Laura Branigan discography
- Years active: 1970–2004
- Label: Atlantic
- Website: www.laurabraniganonline.com

Laura Ann Kruteck (née Branigan; July 3, 1952 (Note: Although most sources at the time of her death gave Branigan's birth year as 1957, reliable sources subsequently confirmed she was born in 1952. Branigan may have altered her age early in her career; for example, in a July 1984 edition of American Top 40, host Casey Kasem called her a "26-year-old singer", which would have placed her birth year approximately in 1957.) – August 26, 2004) was an American singer. Her signature song, the platinum-certified 1982 cover of Umberto Tozzi's single "Gloria", stayed on the U.S. Billboard Hot 100 for 36 weeks, then a record for a female artist, peaking at No. 2. It also reached number one in Australia and Canada. In 1984, she reached number one in Canada and Germany and No. 4 in the U.S. with "Self Control". "Gloria" and "Self Control" were also successful in the United Kingdom, each hitting the top 10 on the UK singles chart.

Her career peaked in the 1980s, with other hits including the top 10 "Solitaire" (1983), the U.S. Adult Contemporary chart number one "How Am I Supposed to Live Without You" (1983), the Australian No. 2 "Ti amo" (1984) (another Tozzi cover), her return to the top 40 with "The Power of Love" (1987), and "Shattered Glass" (1987), which reached the top 15 of the U.S. dance chart. Her most successful studio album was 1984's platinum Self Control. She also contributed songs to motion picture and television soundtracks, including the Grammy and Academy Award–winning Flashdance soundtrack (1983), the Ghostbusters soundtrack (1984), and Miami Vice (1984). In 1984, she won the Tokyo Music Festival with the song "The Lucky One".

Her chart success waned as the decade closed, and after her last two albums Laura Branigan (1990) and Over My Heart (1993) garnered little attention, she generally retired from public life for the rest of the 1990s. She returned to performing in the early 2000s, notably appearing as Janis Joplin in the off-Broadway musical Love, Janis. She was recording new music and preparing a comeback to the music industry.

Branigan and her music saw renewed popularity and public interest when "Gloria" was adopted by the NHL's St. Louis Blues as their unofficial victory song as the team won its first Stanley Cup in franchise history in 2019.

== Life and career ==
=== 1952–1970: Early life ===
Laura Ann Branigan was born on July 3, 1952, in Mount Kisco, New York, the fourth of five children born to Irish American parents Kathleen (née O'Hare) and James Branigan Sr., an account executive and mutual funds broker; they later separated. Her younger brother, William "Billy" Branigan, also a musician, played guitar in Branigan's backing band early in her career and contributed to her 1993 album Over My Heart as co-producer, arranger, guitarist, bassist, and backing vocalist in addition to co-writing the track "Over You" with his sister. He died of a heart attack in 2022, aged 65.

Branigan was raised in Armonk, New York, and attended Catholic school in nearby Chappaqua. She attended Byram Hills High School, graduating in 1970.

=== 1971–1980: Career beginnings ===
In 1972, Branigan formed the folk-rock band Meadow. A year later, the group released their debut album The Friend Ship. After Meadow disbanded, Branigan was one of Leonard Cohen's backup singers for his European tour in 1976. In 1979, Branigan was signed by Ahmet Ertegun to Atlantic Records.

=== 1981–1990: Mainstream success ===
"Gloria"
29-second sample

Branigan's nine-track debut album, Branigan, came out in 1982. The first single, "All Night with Me", reached No. 69 on the Billboard charts. "Gloria", recorded in 1979 by Umberto Tozzi and a hit in Europe, was the second single. Pop radio was initially unreceptive, but it eventually became one of the biggest hits of the 1980s. The album sold gold, and the single sold platinum (sales of more than one million U.S. copies). Branigan was nominated for a Grammy Award for Best Female Pop Vocal Performance alongside Linda Ronstadt, Olivia Newton-John, Juice Newton, and that year's winner, Melissa Manchester.

Branigan 2 was released in 1983, with her English-language version of "Solitaire", originally written and recorded by Martine Clemenceau, hitting the US top 10. The English translation of "Solitaire" was the first major hit for Diane Warren, and "How Am I Supposed to Live Without You" was the first major hit for its co-writer, Michael Bolton.

Having acted on West German television before her singing career took off, Branigan took roles on CHiPs, Automan, and Knight Rider at the height of her career. She later appeared in films, including Mugsy's Girls (1985) and Backstage. She sang on national television and radio campaigns for Dr Pepper, Coca-Cola, and Chrysler, which sponsored her 1985–86 tour.

In 1984, "Self Control", the title track of Branigan's third album, peaked at No. 4 in the US and became her biggest hit internationally. Other hits from Self Control include "The Lucky One" (which won her a Tokyo Music Festival prize), "Ti Amo", which was another Umberto Tozzi cover, and "Satisfaction".

Branigan's live show was recorded twice in 1984, for a nationally syndicated radio special, and for a concert video. Branigan was nominated at the American Music Awards of 1985 for favorite pop/rock female video artist (won by Cyndi Lauper). In 1985, Branigan performed the main theme for the mini-series Hollywood Wives, based on the Jackie Collins novel.

By the time of Branigan's fourth album, Hold Me, in 1985, "Self Control" was a worldwide success. The hits continued with "Spanish Eddie", her sixth U.S. Billboard top 40 hit. The title track "Hold Me" was a dance hit, and Branigan's introduction of "I Found Someone" (co-written with Michael Bolton, and later covered by Cher) scored on the adult contemporary chart. Branigan made her fourth appearance on American Bandstand to perform "Spanish Eddie" and "Hold Me".

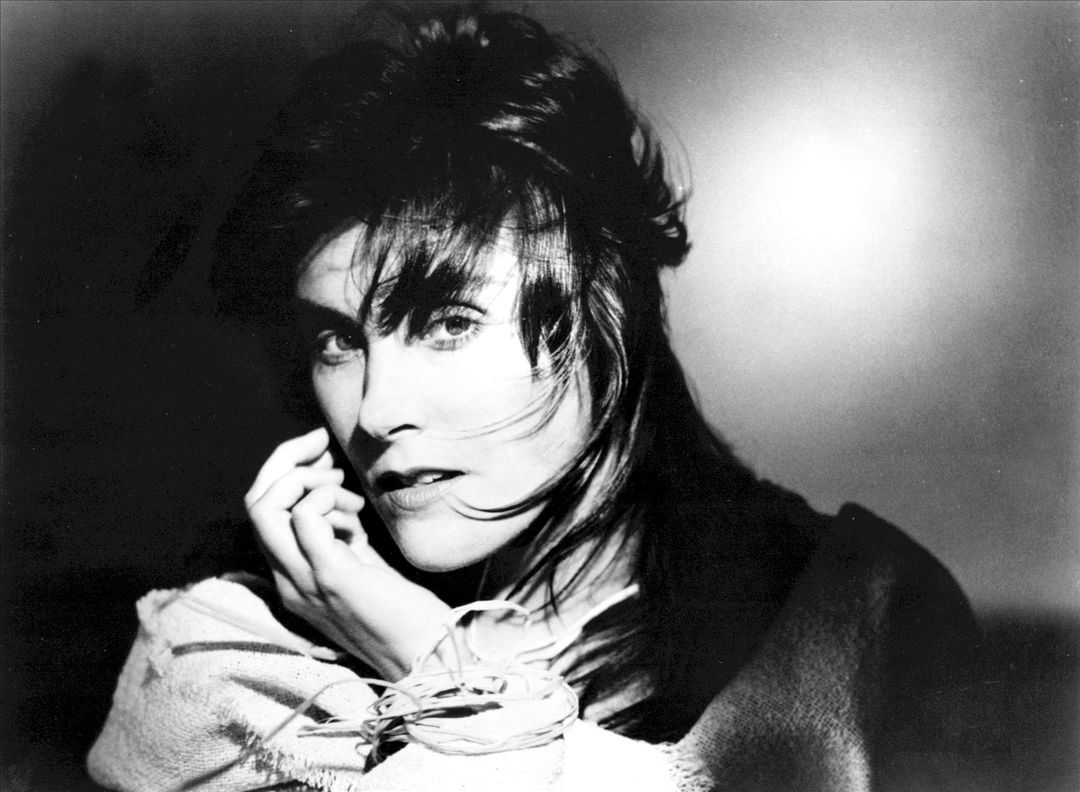
Branigan c. 1987

Branigan was the final guest on American Bandstand during that show's run on ABC, performing "Shattered Glass" in 1987. Her album Touch brought her back to the Billboard top 40 with her cover of Jennifer Rush's "Power of Love".

Her album Laura Branigan (1990) featured the last of her hit singles, "Never in a Million Years". The closing track, a cover of Bryan Adams' "The Best Was Yet to Come", was produced and arranged by Branigan. Her tour kicked off with an appearance on The Tonight Show Starring Johnny Carson in 1990, followed by a concert at the Trump Regency Showroom in Atlantic City, New Jersey on July 14, and filmed for a syndicated U.S. television show SRO in Concert, released on home video.

=== 1991–2000: Later career and hiatus ===
Branigan's seventh and final studio album, Over My Heart, came out in 1993. Branigan had greatest hits collections released in South America, Japan, Germany, South Africa, and the U.S. In 1994, Larry Kruteck, Branigan's husband (m. 1978), was diagnosed with cancer. Branigan nursed him full-time until his death in 1996.

=== 2001–2004: Return to music ===
In early 2001, Branigan's return to the stage was postponed when she broke both of her femurs in a fall from a ladder outside her home in New York. In 2002, she performed twice as Janis Joplin in Love, Janis, before dropping out of the role. "I left Janis because the producers failed to file with Equity properly," she told the Sunday News. "I was sort of relieved. My voice isn't anything like Janis Joplin's, and there were 19 of her songs in the show."

== Personal life ==
Branigan married Lawrence Kruteck in 1978. He was diagnosed with colon cancer in the mid-1990s, and Laura cut back on her entertainment career to take care of him. He died in 1996. She went on to date the drummer in her band, actor/musician Tommy Bayiokos.

== Death ==
Branigan died in her sleep at her lodge in East Quogue, New York, on August 26, 2004, aged 52. The cause was an undiagnosed cerebral aneurysm. It was reported that she had experienced headaches for several weeks before her death, but did not seek medical attention. Branigan was cremated, and her ashes were scattered over Long Island Sound.

At the time of Branigan's death, it was reported that she was 47 years old. The Associated Press issued a correction in 2016.

== Legacy ==
At Byram Hills High School in Armonk, New York, the Laura Branigan Memorial Scholarship is given annually to a senior for excellence in the performing arts.

=== "Play Gloria" association with St. Louis Blues ===
The St. Louis Blues NHL team began using Branigan's version of "Gloria" as its unofficial victory song when they went on a franchise-record 11-game winning streak during the 2018–19 season. The team advanced to the 2019 Stanley Cup Final and defeated the Boston Bruins. The bands Phish and Vampire Weekend, both holding concerts in St. Louis on the night of Game 7, performed "Gloria" when the Blues won the cup. The dramatic turnaround in the Blues' fortunes led to "Gloria" being embraced as their new victory anthem, with the song played every time the Blues win a home game. "Gloria" re-entered the Billboard charts and reached No. 3 on the iTunes singles chart.

Branigan's other hits saw significant upticks in streams and downloads, and her management received numerous requests for live performances, necessitating a statement reminding the public that Branigan is deceased. Terming "Gloria" an "unlikely championship anthem", Forbes noted that the Blues' Stanley Cup victory could permanently alter the meaning and legacy of the song, with it forever associated with the St. Louis Blues and hockey in general.

== Discography ==
Studio albums

- Branigan (1982)
- Branigan 2 (1983)
- Self Control (1984)
- Hold Me (1985)
- Touch (1987)
- Laura Branigan (1990)
- Over My Heart (1993)

== Filmography ==
Film
Year	Film	Role	Notes
1985	Mugsy's Girls	Monica	Also known as Delta Pi
1988	Backstage	Kate Lawrence	

Television
Year	Title	Role	Notes
1982	Macy's Thanksgiving Day Parade	Herself	Performer of "Gloria"
1982	Saturday Night Live	Herself	Performer of "Gloria" and "Living a Lie"
1983	CHiPs	Sarah	Guest star in "Fox Trap" (season six, episode 16)
1983	A Solid Gold Christmas	Herself	Performer of "It's Beginning to Look a Lot Like Christmas" and "Santa Claus Is Coming to Town"
1983	Dick Clark's New Year's Rockin' Eve	Herself	Performer of "How am I Supposed to Live Without You" and "Solitaire"
1984	Automan	Jessie Cole	Guest star in "Murder MTV" (season one, episode nine)
1984	Laura Branigan in Concert	Herself	Her concert live from Caesars Tahoe
1984	Rock Rolls On	Herself	Co-host, performer of "Self Control" and "The Lucky One"
1985	Cover Story	Herself	Biography
1986	The 13th Annual American Music Awards	Herself	TV Special; Presenter; Venue: Shrine Auditorium, Los Angeles, California, USA
1986	Disney's Living Seas	Herself	Performer and composer of "If I Were a River"
1988	Record Guide '88	Herself	Interview
1990	SRO: In Concert	Herself	Her concert live from Atlantic City
1991	Monsters	Amanda Smith-Jones	Guest star in "A Face for Radio" (season three, episode 19)
2002	VH-1 Where Are They Now?	Herself	Guest star in "Musicians" (season two, episode 3)

== Soundtrack ==
Year	Production	Notes
1983	Love Is Forever	performer: "Love Is Forever", "Passion and Valor"
1983	Flashdance	performer: "Imagination", "Gloria"
1984	Ghostbusters	performer: "Hot Night"

Theater
Year	Title	Role	Notes
2002	Love, Janis	Janis Joplin	Off-Broadway, New York

== Awards and nominations ==
Award	Year	Category	Work	Result
Grammy Awards	1982	Best Pop Vocal Performance – Female	"Gloria"	Nominated
Grammy Awards	1983	Album of the Year	"Imagination" (Flashdance soundtrack)	Nominated (Note: This nomination was shared with the producer and the various artists with tracks on the soundtrack album.)
Billboard Year-End	1982	Top Pop Artists Female	Singles & Albums	Nominated
Billboard Year-End	1983	Top Pop Artists Female	Singles & Albums	Won
Billboard Year-End	1984	Top Pop Artists Female	Singles & Albums	36th place
Billboard Year-End	1985	Top Pop Album Artists Female	Albums	14th place
Billboard Year-End	1988	Top Pop Single Artists Female	Singles	22nd place
American Music Awards	1984	Favorite Pop/Rock Female Video Artist	"Self Control"	Nominated
Tokyo Music Festival	1984	Grand Prix Award for Best Vocal Performance	"The Lucky One"	Won
