= Greatest Hits: 1965–1992 =

Greatest hits album by Cher
- Released: November 9, 1992
- Recorded: 1965–1992
- Genres: Pop rock; soft rock
- Length: 61:23
- Label: Geffen
- Producers: Cher; Peter Asher; Michael Bolton; Sonny Bono; Desmond Child; Snuff Garrett; Jimmy Iovine; Jon Bon Jovi; Ron Nevison; Guy Roche; Bob Rock; Richie Sambora; Jim Steinman; Diane Warren; Richie Zito

Cher chronology
Love Hurts (1991)	Greatest Hits: 1965–1992 (1992)	It's a Man's World (1995)

Singles from Greatest Hits: 1965–1992
- 1. "Oh No Not My Baby" Released: November 2, 1992 (UK); 2. "Many Rivers to Cross" Released: January 4, 1993 (UK); 3. "Whenever You're Near" Released: February 22, 1993 (UK)

Greatest Hits: 1965–1992 is the first comprehensive compilation album by American singer-actress Cher, released on November 9, 1992, by Geffen Records outside of North America. The album reached the top 10 in several European countries and topped the UK Albums Chart for 7 non-consecutive weeks where it became the best-selling album by a female artist of 1992.

== Album information ==
Notable hit songs included on this album are "The Shoop Shoop Song", which charted at number one in more than 10 countries worldwide, "If I Could Turn Back Time", which was Cher's biggest hit at the time and "I Got You Babe". Three new songs were also recorded for this album: "Oh No Not My Baby" (originally sung by Maxine Brown), "Whenever You're Near", and a live recording of "Many Rivers to Cross" (originally sung by Jimmy Cliff).

== Critical reception ==
Professional ratings
Review scores
Source	Rating
AllMusic	3/5 stars
NME	4/10
Select	2/5 medals

AllMusic's Jose F. Promis gave the album three stars out of five. He described the album as "somewhat random — perhaps focusing exclusively on her rock hits would have been a better choice, because including just a couple of old tracks proves somewhat frustrating." He also pointed out that hit songs like "Half-Breed" were not included and believed it affects the album.

== Track listing ==
Credits adapted from the album's liner notes.

No.	Title	Writer(s)	Producer(s)	Length
1.	"Oh No Not My Baby"	Carole King; Gerry Goffin	Peter Asher	3:09
2.	"Whenever You're Near"	Tommy Shaw; Jack Blades	Ron Nevison	4:05
3.	"Many Rivers to Cross" (live from the Mirage)	Jimmy Cliff	Cher	4:09
4.	"Love and Understanding" (from Love Hurts, 1991)	Diane Warren	Warren; Guy Roche	4:42
5.	"Save Up All Your Tears" (from Love Hurts)	Warren; Desmond Child	Bob Rock; Richie Zito	3:58
6.	"The Shoop Shoop Song (It's in His Kiss)" (from the Mermaids soundtrack, 1990)	Rudy Clark	Asher	2:49
7.	"If I Could Turn Back Time" (from Heart of Stone, 1989)	Warren	Warren; Roche	3:59
8.	"Just Like Jesse James" (from Heart of Stone)	Warren; Child	Child	4:05
9.	"Heart of Stone" (from Heart of Stone)	Andy Hill; Pete Sinfield	Asher	4:16
10.	"I Found Someone" (from Cher, 1987)	Michael Bolton; Mark Mangold	Bolton	3:42
11.	"We All Sleep Alone" (from Cher)	Child; Jon Bon Jovi; Richie Sambora	Child; Jovi; Sambora	3:54
12.	"Bang-Bang" (from Cher)	Sonny Bono	Child; Jovi; Sambora	3:52
13.	"Dead Ringer for Love" (with Meat Loaf) (from Dead Ringer, 1981)	Jim Steinman	Meat Loaf; Stephan Galfas	4:22
14.	"Dark Lady" (from Dark Lady, 1974)	John Durill^{[a]}	Snuff Garrett	3:27
15.	"Gypsys, Tramps & Thieves" (from Chér, 1971)	Robert Stone	Garrett	2:36
16.	"I Got You Babe" (Sonny & Cher, from Look at Us, 1965)	Bono	Bono	3:11

Notes

- ^{^[a]} John Durrill is incorrectly credited as John Durill

== Personnel ==
- Cher – main vocals
- Sonny Bono – main vocals
- Meat Loaf – main vocals
- Ron Wikso – drums (track 3)
- Hugh McDonald – bass (track 3)
- Dave Amato – guitar (track 3)
- David Shelley – guitar (track 3)
- Gary Scott – piano (track 3)
- Paul Mirkovich – keyboards (track 3)
- Darlene Love – background vocals (track 3)
- Edna Wright – background vocals (track 3)
- Patty Darcy – background vocals (track 3)
- Snuff Garrett – producer
- Jon Bon Jovi – producer
- Dan Hersch – mastering
- Barry King – photography
- Harry Langdon – photography

== Charts ==
=== Weekly charts ===
Chart (1992–99)	Peak position
Australian Albums (ARIA)	48
Austrian Albums (Ö3 Austria)	6
Danish Albums (Hitlisten)	7
Dutch Albums (Album Top 100)	41
European Albums (Top 100)	5
Finnish Albums (Suomen virallinen lista)	40
German Albums (Offizielle Top 100)	16
Irish Albums (IRMA)	9
New Zealand Albums (RMNZ)	6
Norwegian Albums (VG-lista)	7
Spanish Albums (PROMUSICAE)	23
Swedish Albums (Sverigetopplistan)	3
Swiss Albums (Schweizer Hitparade)	19
UK Albums (Official Charts)	1
Zimbabwean Albums (ZIMA)	1

Chart (2018–19)	Peak position
Australian Catalogue Albums (ARIA)	29
Australian Physical Albums (ARIA)	19
UK Album Downloads Chart (OCC)	69

=== Year-end charts ===
Chart (1992)	Position
Swedish Albums (Sverigetopplistan)	76
UK Albums (OCC)	3
Chart (1993)	Position
European Top 100 Albums	81
Swedish Albums (Sverigetopplistan)	49
UK Albums (OCC)	69
Chart (1999)	Position
Norwegian Christmas Period Albums (VG-lista)	9
Swedish Albums (Sverigetopplistan)	74

== Certifications and sales ==
Region	Certification	Certified units/sales
Austria (IFPI Austria)	Gold	25,000^{*}
Germany (BVMI)	Gold	250,000^{^}
New Zealand (RMNZ)	4× Platinum	60,000^{^}
Norway (IFPI Norway)	Gold	25,000^{*}
Sweden (GLF)	Platinum	100,000^{^}
Switzerland (IFPI Switzerland)	Gold	25,000^{^}
United Kingdom (BPI)	3× Platinum	1,000,000
^{*} Sales figures based on certification alone.^{^} Shipments figures based on certification alone.
