= Love Hurts Tour =

1991–92 concert tour by Cher

- Tour by Cher
- Tour program booklet
- Associated album: Love Hurts
- Start date: October 25, 1991
- End date: November 1, 1992
- Legs: 3
- No. of shows: 23 in Europe; 27 in North America; 50 total

Cher concert chronology
- Heart of Stone Tour (1989–90); Love Hurts Tour (1991–92); Do You Believe? Tour (1999–2000)

The Love Hurts Tour was the third solo concert tour by American singer-actress Cher. The tour supported her twentieth studio album, Love Hurts. The tour reached Europe and North America. It played in arenas and followed the previous Heart of Stone Tour.

== Background ==
Encouraged by the reception of the album Love Hurts, the European smash single "The Shoop Shoop Song", and after the performance of "Could've Been You" at Top of the Pops – considered as a tour preview, Cher performed six shows as a tour preview at the Sands Atlantic City in Atlantic City, New Jersey. After the promotion of the album on various American TV shows (like Late Night with David Letterman, Dame Edna Show, In Concert and others...). Although Cher toured Europe extensively, she performed a limited tour in the United States. The tour was originally set to commence in March 1992, however, this was postponed until April 1992 due to illness. During an interview, Cher apologized to spectators stating, "I am very disappointed that we had to postpone these shows and I apologize to all my fans who bought tickets."

In comparison with her previous tour, the show was less elaborate, but more controversial for the clothes and the religious symbols used. At the center of the stage there was a big dry tree with branches that extended to the two sides of the stage. There were also brick-like columns and on top of each there was a religious symbol: a serpent pierced, a stylized fish that the first Christians drew in the catacombs, a cross, the symbol of peace, and the heart of the Ex-voto (which was also used for the first controversial cover of the album Heart of Stone). Above, hanging on the right, there was a black angel, naked, with big golden wings. Since the tour was rock centric, many of her popular songs were not performed. Several covers performed including: "Many Rivers To Cross", "Fire", "Love is a Battlefield" and her recent number one hit in the UK "The Shoop Shoop Song", from the film Mermaids.

=== Costumes ===
Fashion designer Bob Mackie created nine unique ensembles for the Love Hurts Tour, repeating the same Leather/Dominatrix style of the Geffen-era. On this, Cher used some clothes already used in previous tours or for public appearances. The first, is for the performance of "We All Sleep Alone" and "I Found Someone" where Cher wore clothes with holes and paillettes and the black curly wig. For the first song she added a black leather jacket. This dress was previously used in "The Black Rose Show" and in the "I Found Someone" music video. During the performance of "After All" Cher wore an Ice Queen fur coat with sequined designs and pointed hat. This was used in the Heart of Stone Tour. The last one was similar to the dress she wore when she attended the Academy Awards and won her award for Best Actress in 1988. This was used for the performance of "Many Rivers to Cross" and was a dark, sparkly, and transparent dress.

All the other dresses were used only for this tour. For the first part of the show, Cher wore a suit. The jacket was always open to show a top in lace with long and transparent sleeves. Cher also had a red curly wig and wore many pearl necklaces. After the second change, Cher wore a lace baby-doll dress, with the black smooth wig or the black curly wig and performed "Love and Understanding" and "Save Up All Your Tears". During the country portion of the show, she wore a bondage corset, black boots, and black trousers. She also used the black curly wig, and sometimes a straw hat. For "Love Is a Battlefield" she wore a dress with a Roman Soldiers look and she used a long black wig. After that Cher performed her hit song "If I Could Turn Back Time" and wore a leather bondage outfit with a curly black wig. Finally, for the encore, Cher wore the same white baby-doll dress with wavy wig. During the European and North American shows the costumes remained the same, except for the night of Halloween in New York, where Cher for the first songs wore a witch dress with a twisted bodice and a black transparent skirt. For the performance she also wore a white and black wig. The same wig was also used for the "If I Could Turn Back Time" performance.

== Concert synopsis ==
In the beginning of the show, a screen projected her life: from her family, to her television, music and film career. After that, the screen went up, and she descended from a platform and began to sing "I Still Haven't Found What I'm Looking For". From here she moves into "Bye Bye Baby", "We All Sleep Alone", "I Found Someone", "Love and Understanding" and "Save up All Your Tears".

When the song ended, the screen came down and showed some scenes of her most famous films. Then she once again descended from the platform and did "After All". After a fast change she performed "Many Rivers To Cross".

After an instrumental song, began the country part of the show. She sang "Fire" and "Just like Jesse James". Then she did "Love Is a Battlefield" and "If I Could Turn Back Time". After those songs she had the first encore and performed "Love Hurts" and "The Shoop Shoop Song (It's in His Kiss)" and ended with the second encore performing "The Fire Down Below". The second encore was only done on a few dates. Generally, the setlist didn't change during the tour, but sometimes Cher replaced some of the songs with covers, or her old songs.

In Sands Hotel & Casino in Atlantic City – New Jersey, shows the customs had changes were less skimpy clothes than was being used on tour. The opening songs Cher used a basic model, “Love and Understanding” had changed wig, “The Shoop Shoop Song” was dates in which she used the smooth wig (like the cover of the album “Love Hurts”) and the wig Video Clip “Save Up All Your Tears”. She used clothes 80's show in Las Vegas (Caesar's Palace show from 1981 to 1982) to new song.

== Set list ==
REHEARSAL

Rehearsal - US 1991

Set list just for one special night with a few guests before the opening concert.

1. "I Still Haven't Found What I'm Looking For"
2. "I'm No Angel"
3. "Bye Bye Baby"
4. "Tougher Than the Rest"
5. "One Night"
6. "I Can't Make You Love Me"
7. "Hold On"
8. "Alberta"
9. "We All Sleep Alone"

Encore

10. "Love Hurts"
11. "The Fire Down Below"

SET LIST

1. "I Still Haven't Found What I'm Looking For"
2. "Love on a Rooftop"
3. "Bye Bye Baby"
4. "We All Sleep Alone"
5. "I Found Someone"
6. "Love and Understanding"
7. "Save Up All Your Tears"
8. "After All" (performed with Paul Mirkovich)
9. "Many Rivers to Cross"
10. "Fire"
11. "Just Like Jesse James"
12. "One Night"
13. "Love Is a Battlefield"
14. "If I Could Turn Back Time"

Encore

15. "Love Hurts"
16. "The Shoop Shoop Song (It's in His Kiss)"
17. "The Fire Down Below"
Notes
- During the show in Paris, Cher performed "Love on a Rooftop" and "One Night".
- During concerts in London, "Fires of Eden" and "Could've Been You"; the former replacing "Bye Bye Baby".
- During the concert in Brussels and Düsseldorf, Cher didn't perform the songs "Love on a Rooftop" and "One Night"
- During the North American leg, Cher performed "The Way of Love" and "One Night" in place of "Many Rivers to Cross". and "Bye Bye Baby", respectively.

== Shows ==
List of concerts, showing date, city, country, venue, tickets sold, number of available tickets and gross revenue
Date	City	Country	Venue	Opening act
North America
October 25, 1991	Atlantic City	United States	Sands Hotel	—N/a
October 26, 1991	Atlantic City	United States	Sands Hotel	—N/a
October 27, 1991	Atlantic City	United States	Sands Hotel	—N/a
November 1, 1991	Atlantic City	United States	Sands Hotel	—N/a
November 2, 1991	Atlantic City	United States	Sands Hotel	—N/a
November 3, 1991	Atlantic City	United States	Sands Hotel	—N/a
February 27, 1992	Las Vegas	United States	Siegfried & Roy Theatre	—N/a
February 28, 1992	Las Vegas	United States	Siegfried & Roy Theatre	—N/a
February 29, 1992	Las Vegas	United States	Siegfried & Roy Theatre	—N/a
March 1, 1992	Las Vegas	United States	Siegfried & Roy Theatre	—N/a
March 2, 1992	Las Vegas	United States	Siegfried & Roy Theatre	—N/a
March 3, 1992	Las Vegas	United States	Siegfried & Roy Theatre	—N/a
March 12, 1992	Las Vegas	United States	Siegfried & Roy Theatre	—N/a
Europe
April 15, 1992	Berlin	Germany	Deutschlandhalle	—N/a
April 16, 1992	Hamburg	Germany	Alsterdorfer Sporthalle	—N/a
April 20, 1992 (Note: Originally set to take place on April 3, 1992.)	Munich	Germany	Olympiahalle	—N/a
April 21, 1992 (Note: Originally set to take place on March 30, 1992.)	Vienna	Austria	Wiener Stadthalle	—N/a
April 22, 1992	Vienna	Austria	Wiener Stadthalle	—N/a
April 24, 1992 (Note: Originally set to take place on April 9, 1992.)	Paris	France	Zénith de Paris	—N/a
April 27, 1992 (Note: Originally set to take place on April 22, 1992.)	Dublin	Ireland	Point Theatre	—N/a
April 28, 1992 (Note: Originally set to take place on April 21, 1992.)	Belfast	United Kingdom	King's Hall	—N/a
April 30, 1992 (Note: Originally set to take place on April 16, 1992.)	Glasgow	United Kingdom	Scottish Exhibition and Conference Centre	The Fingertips
May 1, 1992	Glasgow	United Kingdom	Scottish Exhibition and Conference Centre	The Fingertips
May 3, 1992	Birmingham	United Kingdom	NEC Arena	The Fingertips
May 4, 1992	Birmingham	United Kingdom	NEC Arena	The Fingertips
May 6, 1992	London	United Kingdom	Wembley Arena	The Fingertips
May 7, 1992	London	United Kingdom	Wembley Arena	The Fingertips
May 9, 1992 (Note: Originally set to take place on March 28, 1992.)	Brussels	Belgium	Forest National	—N/a
May 10, 1992 (Note: Originally set to take place on April 12, 1992.)	Düsseldorf	Germany	Philips Halle	Thomas Brill
May 12, 1992 (Note: Originally set to take place on April 1, 1992.)	Frankfurt	Germany	Festhalle Frankfurt	—N/a
May 13, 1992 (Note: Originally set to take place on April 5, 1992.)	Mannheim	Germany	Maimarkthalle	—N/a
May 14, 1992	Zürich	Switzerland	Hallenstadion	Split & Sonja Kimmons
May 16, 1992 (Note: Originally set to take place at Falcon Theatre on March 21, 1992.)	Copenhagen	Denmark	Tivoli Concert Hall	Monique Spartalis
May 18, 1992 (Note: Originally set to take place on March 23, 1992.)	Stockholm	Sweden	Stockholm Globe Arena	—N/a
May 19, 1992 (Note: Originally set to take place on March 25, 1992.)	Gothenburg	Sweden	Scandinavium	—N/a
May 27, 1992	Frankfurt	Germany	Music-Hall	—N/a
North America
June 11, 1992	Las Vegas	United States	Siegfried & Roy Theatre	—N/a
June 12, 1992	Las Vegas	United States	Siegfried & Roy Theatre	—N/a
June 13, 1992	Las Vegas	United States	Siegfried & Roy Theatre	—N/a
June 14, 1992	Las Vegas	United States	Siegfried & Roy Theatre	—N/a
June 15, 1992	Las Vegas	United States	Siegfried & Roy Theatre	—N/a
June 16, 1992	Las Vegas	United States	Siegfried & Roy Theatre	—N/a
October 23, 1992 (Note: Originally set to take place from October 25 to 27, 1992; after being rescheduled from October 18 to 20.)	Atlantic City	United States	Copa Room	—N/a
October 24, 1992	Atlantic City	United States	Copa Room	—N/a
October 25, 1992	Atlantic City	United States	Copa Room	—N/a
October 27, 1992 (Note: Originally scheduled to take place from May 27 to 31, 1992; after being rescheduled from May 30, 31, and June 4 to 6.)	New York City	United States	Paramount Theatre at Madison Square Garden	—N/a
October 28, 1992	New York City	United States	Paramount Theatre at Madison Square Garden	—N/a
October 30, 1992	New York City	United States	Paramount Theatre at Madison Square Garden	—N/a
October 31, 1992	New York City	United States	Paramount Theatre at Madison Square Garden	—N/a
November 1, 1992	New York City	United States	Paramount Theatre at Madison Square Garden	—N/a

=== Box office score data ===
Venue	City	Tickets sold / available	Gross revenue
Madison Square Garden	New York City	26,040 / 26,995 (96%)	$1,068,078

== Cancelled shows ==
List of cancelled concerts, showing date, city, country, venue, and reason for cancellation
Date	City	Country	Venue	Reason
April 5, 1992	New York City	United States	Paramount Theatre at Madison Square Garden	Unknown
March 26, 1992	Oslo	Norway	Oslo Spektrum	Unknown
April 2, 1992	Cologne	Germany	Köln Sporthalle	Unknown
April 7, 1992	Bern	Switzerland	Festhalle Bern	Unknown
April 18, 1992	Rotterdam	Netherlands	Rotterdam Ahoy	Unknown

== Personnel ==
Production

- Tour Manager: Bill Sammeth / Charlie Stuart Gay
- Producer: Richard Wechsler
- Executive Producer: David Kelly
- Stage Designer: Jeremy Railton
- Lighting Design: Live Light INC.
- Cher's Personal Trainer: Angela Best
- Costumes Designer: Bob Mackie and Maggie Barry
- Musical Direction & Choreographer: Doriana Sanchez

Band

- Guitar: Dave Amato
- Drums: Ron Wikso
- Keyboards: Paul Mirkovich and Dave Vanacore and Scott Gorham
- Keyboard Technician in Atlantic City: Peter Wiltz
- Background vocals: Patty Darcy Jones
- Supporting Vocals: Dava Amata and Paul Mirkovich
- Dancer: Bubba Carr, Aaron Cash, Michelle Rudy Mirkovich, and Trish Ramish
