= Could've Been You =

1992 single by Cher

- UK 7-inch single cover

Single by Cher

from the album Love Hurts
- B-side: "One Small Step" (duet with Richard Page); "Love and Understanding"
- Released: April 6, 1992
- Length: 3:30
- Label: Geffen
- Songwriters: Arnie Roman; Bob Halligan
- Producer: Peter Asher

Cher singles chronology
| "Love Hurts" (1991) | "Could've Been You" (1992) | "When Lovers Become Strangers" (1992) |

"Could've Been You" is a song originally performed by American rock singer Bob Halligan and later popularized by American singer-actress Cher. The song was written by Halligan and Arnie Roman for Halligan's 1991 album, Window in the Wall. Cher's cover version was produced by Peter Asher and released exclusively for the European market in early 1992 by Geffen Records as the fifth single from Cher's 20th studio album, Love Hurts (1991). Lyrically, "Could've Been You" is a message from the song's protagonist to their ex.

Cher's version of "Could've Been You" received positive reviews from critics and peaked at number thirty-one on the UK Singles Chart. Cher promoted the song through appearances at Top of the Pops and Aspel and Company.

== Background ==
In 1991, Bob Halligan released his album Window in the Wall under Atco Records. The only single released from the album was its lead track, "Could've Been You", which Halligan had co-written with Arnie Roman. According to Halligan, Atco Records had been going through a "political upheaval" that year and his record "was one of several recordings that was allowed to slip gently into the night". Halligan "dryly notes, '["Could've Been You"] lasted three weeks at radio. It came out to the sound of one hand clapping'".

Later the same year, Cher covered "Could've Been You" for her album Love Hurts. Her version was produced by Peter Asher, who had previously worked with Cher on her 1991 UK number one hit "The Shoop Shoop Song (It's in His Kiss)". The B-side of the first UK 7-inch single release was "One Small Step", a duet with American singer-songwriter Richard Page, while the B-side of the second UK 7-inch single was "Love and Understanding". The second UK 7-inch single and the Germany Maxi-single were both released with the same cover, an image of Cher in a baby doll dress, while the first UK 7-inch was released with the same photo cut to show only Cher's legs. The whole photo was later reused for the cover of the Love Hurts tourbook. The UK 12-inch single was the last released; its cover has a transparent vinyl and shows Cher in a long, smooth black wig. In 1993, "Could've Been You" was rereleased as the B-side of Cher's "Whenever You're Near" UK 7-inch single.

Cher promoted "Could've Been You" with a live performance on Top of the Pops on April 9, 1992, six days before the beginning of her first European tour, the Love Hurts Tour in Berlin, Germany. For the performance Cher wore a curly red wig and a suit with the jacket open to show a leather bra. On April 11, 1992, Cher appeared on the Aspel and Company show to perform the song and be interviewed by Michael Aspel.

== Critical reception ==
"Could've Been You"
Although somehow successful, the song neved appeared on any of Cher's greatest hits albums.

"Could've Been You" received positive reviews from critics. Rock critic Jim Farber of Entertainment Weekly said of the album that "[i]t's that much more fun in numbers like 'Could've Been You', in which, seeking revenge, she gets to reach between the jerk's legs and squeeze." David Wild of the Guilford County, North Carolina News & Record called "Love and Understanding", "Save Up All Your Tears" and "Could've Been You" "strong tracks" that "show that she is still an effective pop singer". The review of the Worcester, Massachusetts Telegram & Gazette newspaper noted "Cher attempts to display her sexual prowess on the song, ...a great vehicle for her, an 'in-your-face' song directed to a former lover".

== Chart performance ==
The song debuted on the UK Singles Chart at number thirty-two on the week of April 18, 1992. In its second week it peaked at number thirty-one, dropping the next week to number forty-three and then to number sixty in its fourth and final week on the chart. The song also entered the German Singles Chart in late May 1992, spending seven weeks on the chart and peaked at number seventy-five.

== Track listings ==
- European 7-inch and cassette single
1. "Could've Been You" – 3:30
2. "One Small Step" – 3:28
- UK 7-inch and cassette single
1. "Could've Been You" – 3:30
2. "Love and Understanding" – 4:43
- European 12-inch and CD single
1. "Could've Been You" – 3:30
2. "One Small Step" – 3:28
3. "When Love Calls Your Name" – 3:32
- UK 12-inch and CD single
1. "Could've Been You" – 3:30
2. "Love and Understanding" – 4:43
3. "Save Up All Your Tears" – 4:00

== Credits and personnel ==
- Artwork – Kevin Reagan
- Management – Bill Sammeth, John Kalodner
- Photography – Herb Ritts
- Producer – Peter Asher
- Recorded and mixed by – Frank Wolf

== Charts ==
| Chart (1992) | Peak position |
|---|---|
| Europe (European Hot 100 Singles) | 73 |
| Germany (GfK) | 75 |
| UK Singles (OCC) | 31 |
| UK Airplay (Music Week) | 17 |
