= Whenever You're Near =

1993 single by Cher

Single by Cher

from the album Greatest Hits: 1965–1992
- B-side: "Could've Been You"
- Released: February 22, 1993
- Length: 4:05
- Label: Geffen
- Songwriters: Jack Blades; Tommy Shaw
- Producer: Ron Nevison

Cher singles chronology
"Many Rivers to Cross" (1993)	"Whenever You're Near" (1993)	"I Got You Babe" (1993)

"Whenever You're Near" is a song composed by Jack Blades and Tommy Shaw, recorded by American singer and actress Cher.

== Song information ==
"Whenever You're Near" was one of three songs recorded exclusively for Cher's first European compilation, Greatest Hits: 1965–1992. The song was released as the album's second single in the United Kingdom and it managed to enter the official UK singles chart for one week, peaking at number 72. The song was released in three formats: CD, 7-inch vinyl, and 12-inch picture disc.

== Critical reception ==
AllMusic called this song "gutsy."

== Track listings ==
- European 7-inch and cassette single
1. "Whenever You're Near" – 4:04
2. "Could've Been You" – 3:26
- European 12-inch and CD single
1. "Whenever You're Near" – 4:04
2. "I'll Never Stop Loving You" – 3:57
3. "Could've Been You" – 3:26
4. "You Wouldn't Know Love" – 3:30

== Charts ==
Chart (1993)	Peak position
UK Singles (OCC)	72

== Release history ==
Region	Date	Format(s)	Label(s)	Ref.
United Kingdom	February 22, 1993	7-inch vinyl; 12-inch vinyl; CD; cassette	Geffen	
Australia	June 21, 1993	CD; cassette	Geffen	
