= When Lovers Become Strangers =

Single by Cher

from the album Love Hurts
- Released: May 1992
- Recorded: 1991
- Genre: Pop rock
- Length: 4:48
- Label: Geffen
- Songwriter: Diane Warren
- Producer: John Kalodner

Cher singles chronology
"Could've Been You" (1992)	"When Lovers Become Strangers" (1992)	"Oh No Not My Baby" (1992)

"When Lovers Become Strangers" is the fourth US single release from American singer/actress Cher's 20th album, Love Hurts (1991), released in US and Canada only in May 1992 by Geffen Records. It was written by Diane Warren and produced by John Kalodner. The song was a top-40 hit in Canada, peaking at number 37.

== Critical reception ==
Larry Flick from Billboard magazine wrote, "Third shot from Cher's fine Love Hurts album is a mournful pop ballad, fueled with a memorable hook and a restrained vocal. Soft, easygoing arrangement will fit equally well within AC and top 40 formats." A reviewer from Cashbox called it a "rock ballad", adding that it "features a more AOR production and seems like more the direction she wants to go."

== Track listing ==
- US promotional CD single
1. "When Lovers Become Strangers" (Edit) – 4:15
2. "When Lovers Become Strangers" (LP Version) – 4:46

== Charts ==
Chart (1992)	Peak position
Canada Top Singles (RPM)	37
Canada Adult Contemporary (RPM)	10
Quebec (ADISQ)	33
US Adult Contemporary (Billboard)	15
