= Techno Cumbia =

Single by Selena

from the album Amor Prohibido and Dreaming of You
- A-side: "Dreaming of You"
- Released: August 14, 1995
- Studio: Q-Productions (Corpus Christi, Texas)
- Genre: Dance-pop; tecnocumbia; dancehall
- Length: 3:47 (original version); 4:45 (remix version)
- Label: EMI; EMI Latin
- Songwriters: Pete Astudillo; A.B Quintanilla III
- Producers: A.B. Quintanilla III; Full Force (remix)

Selena singles chronology
| "Dreaming of You" (1995) | "Techno Cumbia" (1995) | "El Toro Relajo" (1995) |

Music video
- "Techno Cumbia" on YouTube

"Techno Cumbia" is a song recorded by American singer Selena for her fourth studio album, Amor Prohibido (1994). It was posthumously released as the B-side track to "Dreaming of You" through EMI Latin on August 14, 1995. "Techno Cumbia" would be put on her fifth and final studio album Dreaming of You (1995) as the fourth single. "Techno Cumbia" was written by Pete Astudillo and co-written and produced by Selena's brother-producer A.B. Quintanilla. The song is a dance-pop and tecnocumbia recording with influences of dancehall, rap, Latin dance, and club music. Lyrically, Selena calls on people to dance her new style, the "techno cumbia", and calls out those who cannot dance.

"Techno Cumbia" garnered acclaim from music critics, who believed it to be one of the better recordings found on Amor Prohibido. Musicologists believed "Techno Cumbia" predated the Latin urban music market and found that Selena spearheaded a new style of music. After Selena died, the song peaked at number 4 on the United States Billboard Hot Latin Songs and Regional Mexican Airplay charts. The recording received the Tejano Music Award for Tejano Crossover Song of the Year in 1995 and received nominations for Single of the Year at the Broadcast Music Inc.'s pop awards and Music Video of the Year at the 1996 Tejano Music Awards.

== Background and release ==
"Techno Cumbia" was written by Selena y Los Dinos backup dancer and vocalist Pete Astudillo and Selena's brother A.B. Quintanilla who also arranged the piece and served as producer. In 2002, A.B. spoke on how Amor Prohibido (1994) was experimental and commented on how "Techno Cumbia" was an example of his ideas of keeping the band's image modern. During the recording sessions, Selena added rap verses to the song; A.B. believed it to be first of its kind for the genre. Selena was shot and killed by Yolanda Saldívar, her friend and former manager of the singer's Selena Etc. clothing boutiques, on March 31, 1995. The song was included on the track listing of the posthumously released album Dreaming of You (1995). A.B. flew to Manhattan to meet up with R&B group Full Force who remixed "Techno Cumbia" along with updating their remix version of Selena's 1992 song "Missing My Baby". San Antonio Express-News writer and Billboard Latin music correspondent, Ramiro Burr believed the addition of "Techno Cumbia" were "remastered, injecting extra percussions to spice them up." The album's remix version and radio edit of "Techno Cumbia" was released as the b-side track to the lead single "Dreaming of You".

== Composition ==
"Techno Cumbia (remix)" (1995)
The remix version of "Techno Cumbia" peaked at number 4 on the Hot Latin Tracks, while the original version peaked at number 1 on two music charts on Billboard.

"Techno Cumbia" is a Spanish-language uptempo techno-pop cumbia song. It draws influences from Latin dance, dancehall, rap, and club music. Musicologists Ilan Stavans and Harold Augenbraum called it a hip-hop fusion song. Billboard magazine Latin music correspondent, John Lannert wrote the liner notes of Dreaming of You and called "Techno Cumbia" a "dancehall thumper". Musicologist James Perone found the recording to be the "richest track" off of Amor Prohibido because of its "rhythmic and textural contrast". Perone compared it to the '90s American dance music scene and commented on how the "techno aspect of the piece is muted; however, Selena's voice is electronically processed for part of the recording." "Techno Cumbia" incorporates "rhythmic shifts from accentuation on off-beats to accentuation on the beat". The "hey, ho" is a reference to American soul singer Ray Charles' call and response 1950s single "What'd I Say", used under a "Latin-style drumbeat".

Texas Monthly editor, Joe Nick Patoski believed "Techno Cumbia" contained the "most popular rhythm [at the time] coursing through the Latin music world". Patoski further wrote that the track "honored" it by "updating it with vocal samples, second line drumming from New Orleans, and horn charts inspired by soca from the Caribbean." This was echoed by word for word from author Deborah Paredez on her book on Selena's fandom. Patoski further wrote that the remix version "may have been laced with such exotica as a reggae toastmaster talking over a teeth-rattling bass line", and called it an "electronic mishmash", and a "pan-Caribbean attack that included soca and Hi Life from the Trinidad". Written in the key of G minor, the beat is set in common time and moves at a moderate 91 beats per minute. The remix version on Dreaming of You has a key signature set in C minor and moves at a moderate 90 bpm. The remix employs a piano, güira, tambourine, French horn and drums. Lyrically, Selena calls on people to dance her new style the "techno cumbia" dance and "humorously" calls out people who cannot dance cumbia. Italian essayists Gaetano Prampolini and Annamaria Pinazzi described the lyrics of "Techno Cumbia" that "summons everyone to the dance floor". Patoski found it to resemble the "nonsensical novelty" song by Shirley Ellis' 1964 single "The Name Game".

== Critical reception and chart performance ==
Because of its mixture of different cultural music genres, "Techno Cumbia" reminded authors Sara Misemer and Walter Clark of Chicano performance artist Guillermo Gómez-Peña's suggestion that "cultures are being superimposed". According to Ed Morales who wrote in his book The Latin Beat, "Techno Cumbia" is easily "forgettable throwaways" among the average listener, but found the recording "catchy" and "sticks in your gut". Author Michael Corcoran wrote in his music guide on Texan music that "Techno Cumbia" has "Michael Jackson-like trills". Patoski believed "Techno Cumbia" was aimed towards the Spanish international market, calling it "the most compelling tune". Author Norma Elia Cantú called "Techno Cumbia", "La Tracalera" (1990), and "La Carcacha" (1992) the "auditory of Tejano music". Morales believed the song "may have been an indirect influence on the fin de siècle collective of disc jockeys from the borderlands around Tijuana called Nortec". Stavans and Augenbraum called "Bidi Bidi Bom Bom", "No Me Queda Más", and "Techno Cumbia" to have been the "key hits of [Amor Prohibido]". Lannert wrote in the Dreaming of You liner notes that Selena "amazingly and quickly reverses field [from the previous track "Tú Sólo Tú"] to reveal a playful cooing growl".

"Techno Cumbia" debuted at number 13 on the United States Billboard Hot Latin Tracks chart on October 7, 1995. In its second week the song rose to number 9, receiving airplay honors that week. On October 21, 1995, "Techno Cumbia" jumped to number 5 and subsequently debuted at number 7 on the U.S. Regional Mexican Airplay chart. The following week the recording gained more airplay spins at radios, however it remained at number 5 on the Hot Latin Tracks chart while the song moved to number 6 on the Regional Mexican Airplay chart. On November 4, 1995, "Techno Cumbia" reached its peak at number 4 on the Hot Latin Tracks chart. In the issue dated November 11, 1995, "Techno Cumbia" received increased airplay spins from the previous tracking week and peaked at number 4 on the Regional Mexican Airplay chart.

== Cultural impact and legacy ==
"Techno Cumbia" is believed by musicologist to have predated the Latin urban music genre—which became one of the most popular subgenres of Latin music in the 2000s decade—and to have spearheaded a new style of music. (Note: According to San Antonio Express-News and Billboard Latin music correspondent, Ramiro Burr found Selena to have "established one of the early templates for pop-cumbia-rap fusions". Ed Morales found "Techno Cumbia" to have marked Selena's "work with a different accent". Matt Doeden found the song to be a "new style" of music altogether, while Herón Márquez wrote that it "signaled a new style of Tejano music.") During a 2002 interview, Astudillo spoke on how the success of "Techno Cumbia" and its cultural impact on Latin music "has set a new trend". He further said that at the time of recording the song, he didn't envision the track to be as successful or impactful as it has been. Following Selena's death, A.B. formed his own group the Kumbia Kings and released "Boom Boom" from his album Shhh! (2001); believed by Billboard to be the direct "descendants of Techno Cumbia". Author Charles Tatum, found "Techno Cumbia" along with Selena's 1992 single "La Caracaha" and "Bidi Bidi Bom Bom" to have revolutionized the Tejano cumbia music scene. Music analyst Guadalupe San Miguel wrote that "Techno Cumbia", "Como la Flor" (1992), and "La Carcacha" were Selena's "biggest cumbia hits". Selena popularized the technocumbia genre during her career. Vibe magazine reported that Full Force was awarded gold and platinum discs for Selena's 1992 song "Missing My Baby" and "Techno Cumbia". The song was included on Selena's 2002 posthumous compilation Ones (album)

The music video of "Techno Cumbia" was released posthumously and used the remix version found on Dreaming of You. The video was choreographed by Kenny Ortega, who later choreographed the music video of Selena's posthumously released "A Boy Like That" single in 1996. The music video featured live performances of Selena singing the song at the Houston Astrodome concert on February 26, 1995, outtakes from her music video for "Bidi Bidi Bom Bom", and performances of the singer during her tour for Amor Prohibido (1994–95). Cecilia Miniucchi served as the director of the video and found the project to be rather challenging to do. "Techno Cumbia" was awarded the Tejano Music Award for Tejano Crossover Song of the Year in 1995. During the awards ceremony, presenter Raul Yzaguirre mistakenly read the Tejano Crossover Song of the Year award as being Shelly Lares. The mistake was corrected during the awards "lengthy break" and Lares gave the award to Selena who was seen in tears and refused to accept the award from Lares, despite Jose Behar (president of EMI Latin) urging the singer to do so. The song was nominated for Music Video of the Year at the 1996 Tejano Music Awards, and Song of the Year at the 1997 Broadcast Music Inc.'s pop awards. Mexican group Liberación recorded the song for the tribute album Mexico Recuerda a Selena (2005). AllMusic's Alex Henderson commented on how Liberación gave "Techno Cumbia" a "grupero treatment". Mexican group Banda El Recodo performed and recorded the track for the live televised tribute concert Selena ¡VIVE! in April 2005."

== Charts ==
| Chart (1995) | Peak position |
|---|---|
| US Hot Latin Songs (Billboard) | 4 |
| US Regional Mexican Airplay (Billboard) | 4 |

== Certifications ==
| Region | Certification | Certified units/sales |
|---|---|---|
| United States (RIAA) | Platinum (Latin) | 60,000^{‡} |
^{‡} Sales+streaming figures based on certification alone.

== Credits and personnel ==
Credits adapted from Dreaming of You liner notes.

- Selena – vocals
- James Echavarria – vocals
- Pete Astudillo – writer
- Ricky Vela – keyboards
- Joe Ojeda – keyboards
- Chris Pérez – guitar
- Suzette Quintanilla – drums
- A.B. Quintanilla – co-writer, bass, arranger, producer, vocals
- Art Meza – percussions

== See also ==
- Latin music in the United States
- 1995 in Latin music

== Sources ==
- Prampolini, Gaetano; Pinazzi, Annamaria (2013). Essays on the Literary Cultures of the American Southwest. Firenze University Press. ISBN 978-8866553939.
- Misemer, Sara M.; Clark, Walter (2008). Secular Saints: Performing Frida Kahlo, Carlos Gardel, Eva Perón, and Selena. Tamesis Books. ISBN 978-1855661615.
- Jackson, La (2014). Musicology 2102: A Quick Start Guide to Diverse Synergies. L.A. Jackson Publishing. ISBN 978-0578154695.
- Cantú, Norma Elia (2002). Chicana Traditions: Continuity and Change. University of Illinois Press. ISBN 0252027019.
- Espectador, El (1999). Cien años de 'colombianidad' : hechos y personajes del siglo. Colombia Press.
- Márquez, Henry (2001). Latin Sensations. Twenty-First Century Books. ISBN 082254993X.
- Tatum, Charles (2013). Encyclopedia of Latino Culture: From Calaveras to Quinceaneras. ABC-CLIO. ISBN 978-1440800993.
- Corcoran, Michael Joseph (2005). All over the map: true heroes of Texas music. University of Texas Press. ISBN 0292709552.
- Doeden, Matt (2012). American Latin Music: Rumba Rhythms, Bossa Nova, and the Salsa Sound. Twenty-First Century Books. ISBN 978-1-4677-0147-1.
- San Miguel, Guadalupe (2002). Tejano Proud: Tex-Mex Music in the Twentieth Century. Texas A&M University Press. ISBN 1585441880. - Read online, registration required
- Morales, Ed (2009). The Latin beat : the rhythms and roots of Latin music from bossa nova to salsa and beyond. Da Capo Press. ISBN 978-0-306-81018-3.
- Morales, Ed (2007). Living in Spanglish: The Search for Latino Identity in America. Macmillan. ISBN 978-1429978231.
- Paredez, Deborah (2009). Selenidad: Selena, Latinos, and the Performance of Memory. Duke University Press. ISBN 978-0822390893.
- Perone, James E. (2012). The Album: A Guide to Pop Music's Most Provocative, Influential, and Important Creations. ABC-CLIO. ISBN 978-0313379079.
- Burr, Ramiro (1999). The Billboard Guide to Tejano and Regional Mexican Music. Billboard books. ISBN 0823076911.
- Patoski, Joe Nick (1996). Selena: Como La Flor. Boston: Little Brown and Company. ISBN 0-316-69378-2.
- Stavans, Ilan; Augenbraum, Harold (2005). Encyclopedia Latina: history, culture, and society in the United States. Grolier Academic Reference. ISBN 0717258157.
