= Love Hurts (Cher album) =

1991 album by Cher

- Cover used for international and digital releases

Studio album by Cher
- Released: June 18, 1991
- Recorded: 1989–1991
- Studios: A&M (Hollywood); Bill Schnee Studios (North Hollywood); The Complex (Los Angeles); Criterion; Little Mountain (Vancouver); Music Grinder (Los Angeles); Oce; Vancouver Studios
- Genres: Pop rock; soft rock; rock
- Length: 43:55 (North American version); 46:45 (International version)
- Label: Geffen
- Producers: Peter Asher; Steve Lukather; Guy Roche; Bob Rock; Diane Warren; Richie Zito

Cher chronology
Heart of Stone (1989)	Love Hurts (1991)	Greatest Hits: 1965–1992 (1992)

Alternative cover
- Cover used for North American edition and some original international editions

Singles from Love Hurts
- 1. "The Shoop Shoop Song (It's in His Kiss)" Released: November 7, 1990; 2. "Love and Understanding" Released: May 21, 1991; 3. "Save Up All Your Tears" Released: September 30, 1991; 4. "Love Hurts" Released: November 25, 1991 (UK); 5. "Could've Been You" Released: April 6, 1992 (UK); 6. "When Lovers Become Strangers" Released: April 27, 1992 (Can.)

Love Hurts is the twentieth studio album by American singer and actress Cher, released on June 18, 1991, by Geffen Records. The album was her final studio album with the record company after a 4-year recording contract. The lead single from the album in Europe was "The Shoop Shoop Song (It's in His Kiss)", while other regions "Love and Understanding" acted as the lead. The follow-up singles were "Save Up All Your Tears", "Love Hurts", "Could've Been You" and "When Lovers Become Strangers". It peaked at number 48 on the Billboard Top 200 albums chart with the sales of 19,000 copies. In November 2011, Billboard stated that Love Hurts had sold 600,000 copies in the US. In Europe the album was a major success, peaking at number one and top 10 in several countries, including the UK where it spent 6 weeks at number one on the UK Albums Chart.

== Album information ==
The record featured production by Bob Rock and saw her continue to collaborate with John Kalodner, Diane Warren and Desmond Child. The album was recorded in late 1990/early 1991, during the first year of Cher's relationship to Bon Jovi's guitarist Richie Sambora. She dedicated the album to him and "every man that ever made me shed a tear".

The album contained four covers: "Save Up All Your Tears" recorded in the late 1980s by Bonnie Tyler in 1988 and Robin Beck in 1989, the Kiss song "A World Without Heroes" recorded in 1981, "Fires Of Eden" recorded by Judy Collins in 1990, and "Love Hurts", a remake of the 1975 version which Cher had previously recorded for her album Stars. This time the song was more pop/rock rather than a ballad. The original version was released by Everly Brothers in 1960; however, the most popular version of the song (and the only rendition of "Love Hurts" to become a hit single in the United States, reaching No. 8 on the Billboard Hot 100 in early 1976) was the one recorded by Scottish hard rock band Nazareth. In addition, the European version of the album also contains the worldwide hit "The Shoop Shoop Song (It's in His Kiss)" (originally recorded by Merry Clayton in 1963), which was released as a single in the United States in 1990 (prior to the release of the "Love Hurts") to promote Cher's film Mermaids, on whose soundtrack it first appeared.

Early releases of the album in the UK had the same cover as the American release, but later European releases had a different cover, showing Cher laying on a white background wearing a red wig. The European release also included the worldwide hit, "The Shoop Shoop Song (It's in His Kiss)" which reached number one in over 10 countries. In the United States, "The Shoop Shoop Song" was available only through the original soundtrack, Mermaids for the film of the same name.

While the album did extremely well in the UK, its singles were only minor hits. "Love and Understanding" was the only big hit in the charts, but the album also produced many fan-favorites including "Could've Been You" and big Cher favorites, "Save Up All Your Tears", "Love Hurts", and "Fires of Eden". Also "Love Hurts and "Could've Been You" was released only in Europe, while "When Lovers Become Strangers" was released only in North America.

The David Cassidy co-written song, "I'll Never Stop Loving You", was released a year later on Cassidy's album, Didn't You Used to be?. One year before, it was already recorded by Heart and released on a Japanese special edition bonus CD for their album Brigade.

== Promotion ==
To promote the album, Cher did several performances worldwide. In North America she promoted the album on Late Night with David Letterman. She also made a special appearance on the ABC program In Concert on June 21, 1991, where she performed "Love Hurts", "Love and Understanding", "Save Up All Your Tears" and "A World Without Heroes". This particular performance was highly criticized because Cher lip-synced all songs from the album, veering from the ABC show's premise to showcase "honest" live rock. Later, during an interview, Cher defended her lip-syncing and In Concert offered her a chance to reappear (with her band plugged in and playing) later in 1991, but the performance never happened.

Cher also promoted the album in some European countries. In the UK she performed "Love and Understanding", "Save Up All Your Tears" and "Could've Been You" on Top of The Pops, on Wogan performed "Love and Understanding" and "Save Up All Your Tears", and on Aspel and Company performed "Could've Been You". Cher also performed "Save Up All Your Tears" in Australia during the Dame Edna Show and with Dame Edna performed "I Got You Babe".

The album received further promotion from her third headlining Love Hurts Tour, which started on April 15, 1992, in Berlin, Germany. The tour was set to start on March 21, 1992, in Copenhagen, but due to illness, the European concerts were rescheduled, except for the UK dates. Later dates on the North American leg of the tour were also rescheduled twice. Cher performed "Love and Understanding", "Save Up All Your Tears", "Love Hurts" and "Fires Of Eden" on her tour.

== Singles ==
"The Shoop Shoop Song (It's in His Kiss)" was released as the albums lead single in Europe on April 1, 1991. Previously released as a single in 1990 from the film Mermaids soundtrack in the US only. When the song was released internationally in 1991, it became a major hit reaching number one in many European countries including the UK. "Love and Understanding" was released as the album's lead single elsewhere on June 3, 1991. The song was moderate hit, reached the top 10 in countries such as the UK and Austria, While peaking inside the top 20 in the US, Canada and Germany.

"Save Up All Your Tears" was released as the third single from the album and has reached top 40 on various charts worldwide, including the United States, Canada and the United Kingdom. “Love Hurts” was released as the fourth single from the album and barely missed the top 40 in the UK. “Could've Been You” was released as the fifth single from the album and barely missed the top 30 in the UK. It also peaked within the top 75 in Germany. “When Lovers Become Strangers” was released as the fifth and final single from the album. It went on to peak in the top 40 in Canada. The song also peaked in the top 10 on the Canadian Adult Contemporary and the top 20 on the US adult contemporary.

== Critical reception ==
Professional ratings
Review scores
Source	Rating
AllMusic	1.5/5 stars
Chicago Tribune	2.5/4 stars
Entertainment Weekly	B+
Los Angeles Times	2.5/4 stars
NME	1/10

Reviews of the record were mixed. On one hand, some critics proclaimed that Love Hurts was the most mature material Cher had tackled in years. Also, critics said Love Hurts was a step up from Heart of Stone, and Cher.

Billboard for example, said that "With a few exceptions, the overall musical direction is more straight-forward rock'n'roll this time, which is the perfect environment for her unique vocal style." AllMusic also said that "The result, however, is particularly formulaic, with Cher's vocals sounding largely uninspired and the production and backing musicians content to be obvious."

But on the hand, some critics derided the album. One critic went as far as to claim that "The only song worth listening to is A World Without Heroes, on an otherwise uninspired album".

== Commercial performance ==
Unlike Heart of Stone and Cher, Love Hurts received less attention in North America yet it was still certified Gold in the US and Platinum in Canada, for reaching the sales of 500,000 and 100,000 copies in those territories, respectively. In European and Oceanian countries, as well as in Australia and New Zealand, the album was very successful, and peaked at number one in four countries: Austria, Ireland, Norway and the United Kingdom. In the UK the album debuted at number one and remained there for six consecutive weeks. After ending its reign at the top, the album remained in the top three for five more weeks and became the 2nd best selling female album of the year after Tina Turner's Simply The Best greatest hits album. It was certified multi-platinum and eventually sold more than 1 million copies.

== Release history ==
- US vinyl – containing the 11-track album.
- European vinyl – containing the 12-track album.
- US limited collectors' box edition Set – promotional edition hinged wooden box casing with a flip-up cover. The package contains the album in a CD cardboard slip and thirteen "tarot cards" with album designs or Cher photos on one side and lyrics/credits on the other.
- European Cassette – unofficial released by Glob Records, with the alternate track list.

== Track listing ==
Love Hurts track listing
No.	Title	Writer(s)	Producer(s)	Length
1.	"Save Up All Your Tears"	Diane Warren; Desmond Child	Bob Rock; Richie Zito	4:00
2.	"Love Hurts" (1991 version)	Boudleaux Bryant	Zito	4:19
3.	"Love and Understanding"	Warren	Warren; Guy Roche	4:44
4.	"Fires of Eden"	Mark Goldenberg; Kit Hain	Peter Asher	3:43
5.	"I'll Never Stop Loving You"	David Cassidy; John Wetton; Sue Shifrin	Rock; Zito	3:57
6.	"One Small Step" (with Richard Page)	Barry Mann; Brad Parker; Wendy Waldman	Asher	3:28
7.	"A World Without Heroes"	Bob Ezrin; Gene Simmons; Lou Reed; Paul Stanley	Steve Lukather	3:09
8.	"Could've Been You"	Arnie Roman; Bob Halligan Jr.	Asher	3:30
9.	"When Love Calls Your Name"	Jimmy Scott; Tom Snow	Asher	3:32
10.	"When Lovers Become Strangers"	Warren	Warren; Roche	4:46
11.	"Who You Gonna Believe"	Gerald Marquez; Kevin Chalfant; Joe Marquez; Steve Fontano	Zito	4:47

Love Hurts – Oceanian, European editions and worldwide digital reissue (bonus track)
No.	Title	Writer(s)	Producer(s)	Length
12.	"The Shoop Shoop Song (It's in His Kiss)"	Rudy Clark	Asher	2:51

Notes

- "Love Hurts" was previously recorded for Cher's twelfth studio album Stars (1975).
- "The Shoop Shoop Song (It's in His Kiss)" is from the Mermaids Original Motion Picture Soundtrack released in 1990.

== Personnel ==
- John Aguto – assistant engineer (2, 11)
- Ken Allardyce – assistant engineer (3, 4, 6, 8–10)
- Peter Asher – producer (4, 6, 8, 9, 12), drums, percussion, programming (6), background vocals (8), percussion (9), band arrangements (12)
- Sandy Bathgate – production coordination (1, 5)
- Martin Brumbach – assistant engineer (7)
- Robbie Buchanan – piano (4), keyboards (6, 8, 9, 12)
- Kim Bullard – keyboards (2, 11)
- Joanie Bye – background vocals (1, 5)
- David Campbell – background vocal arrangements (4, 6, 8, 9, 12), orchestral arrangements (4), string arrangements (12), conductor (4)
- Joey Cathcart – background vocals (2, 11)
- Margo Chase – design
- Luis Conte – percussion (7)
- Laura Creamer – background vocals (3, 10)
- Mickey Curry – drums (1, 5)
- Lisa Dalbello – background vocals (1, 5)
- Jeff DeMorris – assistant engineer (3, 10)
- David J. Donnelly – mastering supervisor
- Doreen Dorian – production coordination (3, 10)
- Kenny Edwards – background vocals (6, 8)
- Mike Fisher – percussion (4, 6, 9, 12), tambourine (8)
- Mike Fraser – engineer (1, 5)
- David Garfield – keyboards (7)
- Steve George – background vocals (1, 5)
- Andrew Gold – electric guitar (6, 12), background vocals (6, 8), 12-string guitar, electric guitar (4), acoustic guitar (9)
- Greg Goldman – assistant engineer (7)
- Scott Harper – string arrangements (3, 10)
- Steve Heinke – assistant engineer (2, 11)
- Dan Hersch – mastering
- Mark Hudson – vocal director (3, 10)
- Randy Jackson – bass guitar (10)
- Jimmy Johnson – bass guitar (12)
- Phil Kaffel – engineer (2), additional engineering (1, 5), mixing (7)
- John Kalodner – producer
- Raven Kane's Girls – background vocals (4, 9, 12)
- Fred Kelly – assistant engineer (1–3, 5, 10, 11)
- Larry Klein – bass guitar (4, 9)
- Mike Kloster – assistant engineer (7)
- Nathaniel Kunkel – assistant engineer (4, 6, 8, 9, 12)
- Greg Ladanyi – engineer (7)
- Marc LaFrance – background vocals (1, 5)
- Michael Landau – guitar (3, 7)
- Julie Last – assistant engineer (3, 4, 6, 8–10, 12)
- Mario Lucy – assistant engineer (3, 10)
- Steve Lukather – producer (7), guitar (2, 9–11), acoustic guitar (7), guitar solo (7), bass guitar (8)
- Richard Marx – background vocals (7)
- George Massenburg – drum engineer (4, 5, 8, 9, 12)
- Jean McClain – background vocals (3)
- Hugh McDonald – bass guitar (1, 5)
- Jim McGillveray – percussion (1, 5)
- Paul Mirkovich – background vocals (2, 11)
- Gil Morales – assistant engineer (4, 6–9, 12)
- Gunnar Nelson – background vocals (2, 11)
- Richard Page – lead vocals (6), background vocals (1, 5, 7)
- David Paich – keyboards (7)
- Katy Parks – production coordination (1, 2, 5, 11)
- Jeff Porcaro – drums (2, 4, 6, 8, 9, 11, 12)
- Mike Porcaro – bass guitar (2, 11)
- Jeff Rach – assistant engineer (1, 2, 4–6, 8, 9, 11, 12)
- Guy Roche – producer (3, 10), synthesizer (3)
- Bob Rock – producer (1, 5)
- Rail Rogurt – assistant engineer (4, 6, 8, 9, 12)
- Bill Sammeth – management
- Glenn Sciurba – guitar (10)
- Connie Scott – background vocals (1, 5)
- Keith Scott – guitar (1, 5)
- Debra Shallman – album coordinator, production coordination (7)
- Josh Sklair – guitar (3, 10)
- Ivy Skoff – production coordination (4, 6, 8, 9, 12)
- Randy Staub – additional engineering (1, 5)
- David Steele – background vocals (1, 5)
- David Thoener – engineer (3, 10), additional engineering (1, 5), mixing (1–3, 5, 10, 11)
- Michael Thompson – electric guitar (4, 9)
- Joe Turano – background vocals (10)
- Myriam Naomi Valle – background vocals (3)
- Carlos Vega – drums (7)
- Howie Vickers – arrangements (1, 5)
- Diane Warren – producer (3, 10), background vocals (3, 10)
- John Webster – keyboards (1, 5)
- Mark T. Williams – drums (3, 10)
- Randy Wine – assistant engineer (2, 11)
- Frank Wolf – engineer (3, 4, 6, 8–10, 12), additional engineering (7), mixing (4, 6, 8, 9, 12)
- Richie Zito – producer (1, 2, 5, 11), additional guitar and keyboards (5)

== Charts ==
=== Weekly charts ===
Weekly chart performance for Love Hurts
Chart (1991)	Peak position
Argentine Albums (CAPIF)	4
Australian Albums (ARIA)	15
Austrian Albums (Ö3 Austria)	1
Canadian Albums (RPM)	29
Danish Albums (Hitlisten)	3
Dutch Albums (Album Top 100)	45
European Albums (Top 100)	3
Finnish Albums (Suomen virallinen lista)	28
German Albums (Offizielle Top 100)	6
Greek Albums (IFPI Greece)	2
Irish Albums (IRMA)	1
New Zealand Albums (RMNZ)	4
Norwegian Albums (VG-lista)	1
Swedish Albums (Sverigetopplistan)	3
Swiss Albums (Schweizer Hitparade)	3
UK Albums (Official Charts)	1
US Billboard 200	48
US Cash Box Top 200 Pop Albums	32

=== Year-end charts ===
1991 year-end chart performance for Love Hurts
Chart (1991)	Position
Austrian Albums (Ö3 Austria)	7
European Top 100 Albums	18
German Albums (Offizielle Top 100)	32
New Zealand (Recorded Music NZ)	35
Norwegian Summer Period Albums (VG-lista)	1
Swedish Albums (Sverigetopplistan)	17
Swiss Albums (Schweizer Hitparade)	13
UK Albums (OCC)	9

1992 year-end chart performance for Love Hurts
Chart (1992)	Position
European Top 100 Albums	93
German Albums (Offizielle Top 100)	80
UK Albums (OCC)	93

== Certifications and sales ==
Certifications and sales for Love Hurts
Region	Certification	Certified units/sales
Australia (ARIA)	Platinum	70,000^{^}
Austria (IFPI Austria)	Platinum	50,000^{*}
Canada (Music Canada)	Platinum	100,000^{^}
Germany (BVMI)	Platinum	500,000^{^}
New Zealand (RMNZ)	Platinum	15,000^{^}
Norway	—	65,670
Sweden (GLF)	Platinum	100,000^{^}
Switzerland (IFPI Switzerland)	Platinum	50,000^{^}
United Kingdom (BPI)	3× Platinum	1,000,000
United States (RIAA)	Gold	600,000
^{*} Sales figures based on certification alone.^{^} Shipments figures based on certification alone.
