= Octavio Ocampo =

Mexican surrealist painter (born 1943)

Octavio Ocampo (born 28 February 1943 in Celaya, Guanajuato, Mexico) is a Mexican surrealist painter. He grew up in a family of designers, and studied art from early childhood. At art school, Ocampo constructed papier mache figures for floats, altars, and ornaments that were used during carnival parades and other festivals. In high school, Ocampo painted murals for the Preparatory School and the City Hall of Celaya. Ruth Rivera, daughter of artist and muralist Diego Rivera, and Maria Luisa Mendoza encouraged him to attend the School of Painting and Sculpture of the National Fine Art Institute.

The talents of Octavio Ocampo are not limited to painting and sculpture, but also extend to acting and dancing. At the Art Institute of San Francisco, he studied all these disciplines and pursued both a film and theater career. In 1976, he began to devote himself solely to painting and sculpture. He now works primarily in the metamorphic style – using a technique of superimposing and juxtaposing realistic and figurative details within the images that he creates.

== Works ==
Octavio Ocampo is one of Mexico's most prolific artists.

Ocampo is known for several works in his sometimes wryly sardonic, sometimes evocative paintings in which detailed images are intricately woven together to create larger images – the optical illusion fading back and stepping forward as you study the pieces, notice the details, and finally recognize the large scale intention. This is what Octavio Ocampo terms his "metamorphic" style.

The Visions Fine Art Gallery in Sedona, Arizona represents Octavio Ocampo in the United States.

Several collections in Mexico contain his work, and individual works of his have been commissioned for among others former President Jimmy Carter (commissioned as a gift from the then President of Mexico José López Portillo it was presented from the United Mexican States), Jane Fonda, Cher (for the front and back covers of her Heart of Stone album), and César Chávez.

== In popular culture ==
Octavio is a feature-length documentary film examining Ocampo's influences and metamorphic painting technique. The film is directed by José Antonio Torres, who was also responsible for the film De Eros & Danza.
