= Dreaming of You (Selena song) =

1995 single by Selena

Single by Selena

from the album Dreaming of You
- B-side: "Techno Cumbia"
- Released: August 14, 1995
- Recorded: March 5, 1995
- Studio: Q-Productions (Corpus Christi, Texas)
- Genre: Pop
- Length: 5:15 (album version); 4:41 (album edit); 4:15 (US radio edit)
- Label: EMI Latin
- Songwriters: Franne Golde; Tom Snow
- Producer: Guy Roche

Selena singles chronology
"Tú, Sólo Tú" (1995)	"Dreaming of You" (1995)	"Techno Cumbia" (1995)

Music video
- "Dreaming of You" on YouTube

"Dreaming of You" is a song recorded by American Tejano singer Selena and released by EMI Latin on August 14, 1995, as the title track and third single from her fifth and final studio album Dreaming of You. Recorded several weeks before Selena's death, the single was released with "Techno Cumbia" as its B-side track and was released posthumously along with the album. Composed by Franne Golde and Tom Snow, the pop ballad contains lyrics that explore feelings of longing and hope that the singer's love interest is thinking about her while she is dreaming of him at night. It was originally written in 1989 for American R&B group The Jets, who turned down the recording. Believing that the track had potential, Golde brought it to Selena, who recorded it for Dreaming of You.

Critics praised the song for its ballad feel and its lyrical content, and some compared it to ballads recorded by Madonna and Paula Abdul. It received the Broadcast Music Incorporated pop award for having two million airplay impressions in 1996 and was listed by a number of publications as one of the best songs recorded by Selena in her musical career. The Los Angeles Times recognized it as one of the top 10 singles of 1995. The recording was also included in Bruce Pollock's book of The 7500 Most Important Songs for the Rock and Roll Era. The accompanying music video features a story about a girl who runs away from home to be with her lover.

"Dreaming of You" peaked at number twenty-two on the US Billboard Hot 100 chart. In Canada, the track peaked at numbers thirty and nine on the RPM Top 100 Singles and Adult Contemporary charts, respectively. As of 2010, the single has sold 254,000 digital downloads, and as of April 2015, has been streamed 788,000 times, according to Nielsen Soundscan. "Dreaming of You" became one of Selena's most popular and recognizable recordings and has since been covered by various artists.

== Background ==
Selena performed at the 1989 Tejano Music Awards, which was attended by José Behar, the former head of Sony Music Latin who had recently launched EMI Latin Records, and the new head of Sony Music Latin. Behar was searching for new Latin acts, and wanted to sign Selena to EMI's Capitol Records, while Sony Music Latin was offering double of Capitol's sum to Selena's father and manager, Abraham Quintanilla, Jr. Behar thought that he had discovered the next Gloria Estefan, but on coming to know about this, his superior called Behar illogical since he had only been in Texas for a week. Quintanilla Jr. chose EMI Latin's offer because of the potential for a crossover, and he wanted his children to be the first musicians to sign with the company.

Before Selena signed her contract with EMI Latin in 1989, Behar and Stephen Finfer requested Selena for an English-language debut album. She was asked to make three demo recordings for Charles Koppelman, chairman of EMI Records. After reviewing them, Koppelman declined a crossover attempt, believing that Selena should first strengthen her fan base. Later, after releasing five Spanish-language albums that all achieved unprecedented milestones in the Latin music industry, Koppelman believed that Selena had peaked in the Spanish music market, and began preparations for a crossover album.

== Recording and release ==
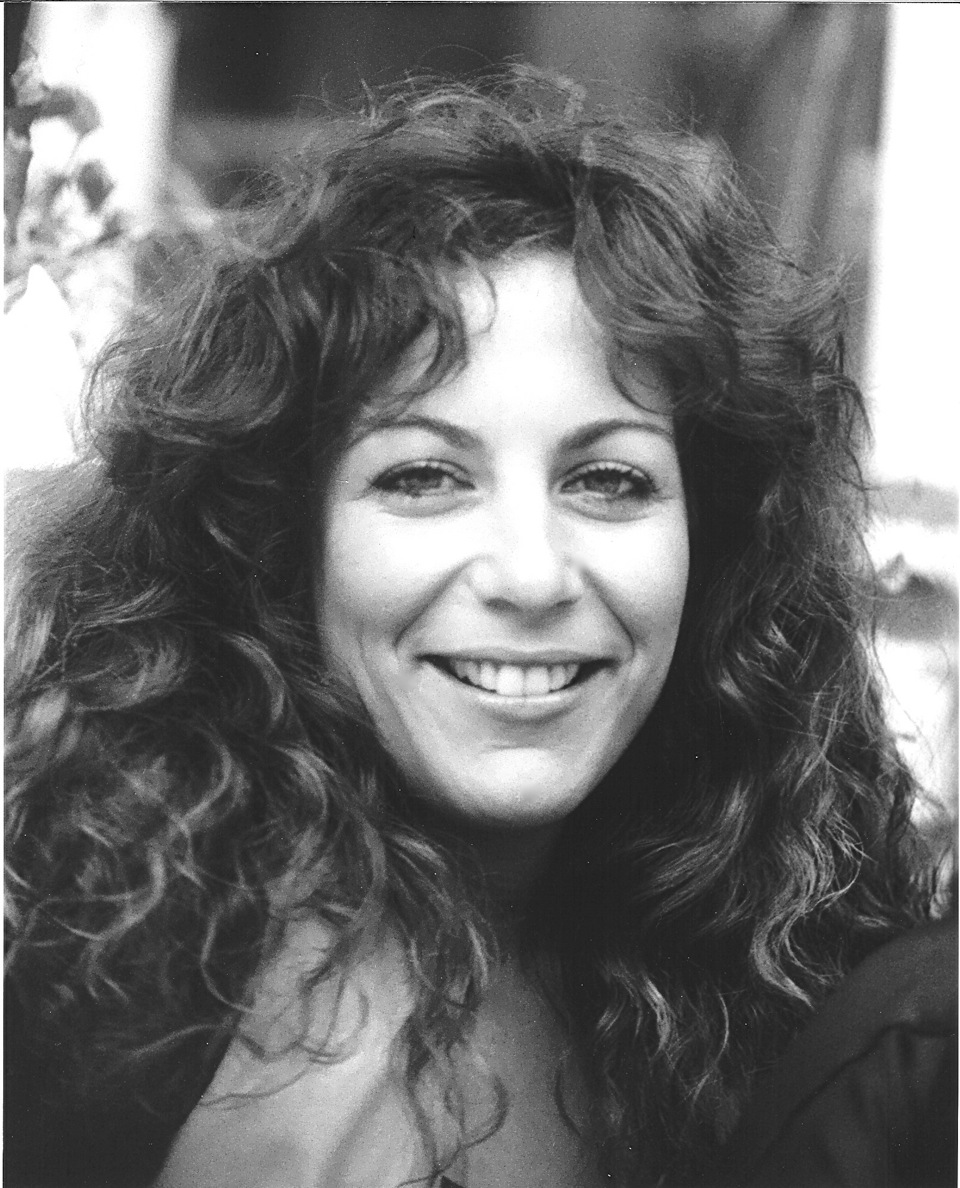
American songwriter Franne Golde (pictured) co-wrote the song along with Tom Snow in 1989.

Starting in 1989, Selena's brother A.B. Quintanilla became the singer's principal music producer and songwriter for her career. He was asked to meet with several producers in New York and choose one who would best "fit with Selena's style". He was unable to produce the crossover album since he was working on Selena's follow-up Spanish-language recording to Amor Prohibido (1994), slated to be released several months after her English-language attempt. Because EMI Records wanted the album to be successful, they only allowed the singer to choose one song she wanted to record for her album. Selena chose "Dreaming of You", a number written by American songwriters Franne Golde and Tom Snow in 1989. Originally, the song had been written for American R&B group The Jets, who turned down the recording. According to Snow, Golde "never gave up on the tune and eventually got it to Selena". When Quintanilla III heard the demonstration recording, he informed her that he did not like the track. Selena told him that she was going to record the song because she favored its lyrical content and message. In a 2002 interview, Quintanilla III believed he was "more judgmental" on his first impression of the demonstration recording than the song itself, citing its melody, content, and song structure for changing his mind about the track. He then called the recording "one of, if not, best song off the album".

After Selena finished recording her cover of the 1961 West Side Story song "A Boy Like That" for RCA Victor on March 3, 1995, she began recording for "Dreaming of You" on March 5 at Quintanilla, Jr.'s recording label Q-Productions in Corpus Christi, Texas. During the recording session, Selena was battling bronchitis. Her father asked her to "just try" and sing the song because several producers had arrived from Los Angeles to watch her record the track. After the recording session wrapped, the producers liked the singer's vocal range in the song and decided to use her first take. American producer Guy Roche produced and arranged the piece along with "Captive Heart". After the arrangement to "Dreaming of You", she wanted her husband Chris Pérez to hear the finished product. He was unable to attend because Quintanilla Jr. wanted him to work with a band he was interested in managing. In 2012, Pérez wrote in his book To Selena, with Love that he regretted not showing up to the recording session for the song. On March 31, 1995, Selena was murdered in Corpus Christi, by her friend and former employee Yolanda Saldívar. Golde provided the backing vocals on the song after Selena's death. "Dreaming of You" was released as the third single for the album Dreaming of You on August 14, 1995, while the album's remix version and radio edit of "Techno Cumbia" was released as the B-side track.

== Composition and lyrics ==
"Dreaming of You" is a mid-tempo pop ballad. It is played in the key of A♭ major at a moderate 84 beats per minute, with the key changing to B♭ major. Selena's vocal range in the song spans from Eb3 to Eb5. Larry Flick, also from Billboard, called the song a "wonderful romantic pop ballad" and that it "warmly illuminates the strengths of her girlish voice and easy going delivery". Flick believed that because of the singer's death, the track's lyrical content is "sweetly optimistic" and that it "[takes] on an affecting poignancy that will not be lost on AC and pop radio programmers." John Lannert, a Latin music contributor for Billboard magazine, wrote in the Dreaming of You booklet that Selena "wrapped her creamy seductive mezzo sound around slow confessionals such as "I Could Fall in Love", "Missing My Baby", and the title track". BuzzFeed contributor Brian Galindo, called the song an "ethereal ballad". "Dreaming of You" is similar to "I Could Fall in Love" in its lyrics. Many media outlets, including the Milwaukee Journal and Billboard magazine, called them "confessional ballads", with an emotionally vulnerable narrator who wants true love but finds it unattainable.

"Dreaming of You" begins with a moderately slow beat. Selena sings that she is up at night thinking of her lover, "wish[ing] on a star" that he is thinking of her too. The song then plays at a moderate tempo, when Selena sings the chorus that she is dreaming of her lover and telling him that she plans on holding him the next day. She then asks her love interest "if you looked in my eyes, would you see what's inside, would you even care?". She then sings of wanting to wait until he can reciprocate her feelings for him, before having "the courage to say how much I love you". Selena switches to Spanish and sings of how much she is dreaming of her lover. Deborah Walker of the Sun Sentinel called the Spanish-language verse "gentle nothings over her own vocals", saying that "such musings appear to have come from the heart". Selena sings the chorus once more before learning her lover reciprocates her feelings, and she says she will endlessly dream of her lover in her room, citing that "there's nowhere in the world where I'd rather be, than here in my room dreaming with you, endlessly" and the song concludes. J. D. Considine of The Baltimore Sun called the lyrics "a delightfully literal approach to the phrase 'sleeping together' as Selena's protagonist visits her love only in her dreams", which is an "endearingly innocent expression of love and longing". Flick said of the ending that it "blissfully fades" and that "all one can do is wonder what the future might have held if things were different".

== Reception ==
=== Critical reception ===
Upon its release, "Dreaming of You" was acclaimed by critics. Robert Johnson of Planet Music, a record chain in Houston, told The New York Times that people in Houston were buying copies of the album Dreaming of You because of the single "Dreaming of You". Conversely, Peter Watrous of The New York Times felt that the songwriters who worked with Selena for her English-language debut album "didn't step up to the bar with their best material" and dismissed her English offerings as "faceless commerce". Watrous believed that because of the singer's vocals on the songs, it suggested "that she had a good chance of success, working lush ballads in an anonymous pop style that Disney has mastered." A San Jose Mercury News reporter wrote that "Dreaming of You" and "I Could Fall in Love" had turned Selena into "the new Gloria Estefan", Peter Harrington of The Washington Post called the sales and radio airplay of the song "extraordinary", saying the song was "eliciting strong radio reaction from both English- and Spanish-language stations, particularly in the Southwest [of the United States]." Bryan Lark, film critic of The Michigan Daily, called the song a "smash". Mario Tarradell of the Beaver County Times, called the song a "cross-over staple".

Ilan Stavans called the song a "Top 40 hit". Ed Morales of Vibe magazine believed "Dreaming of You" echoed a "Madonna-like mid-tempo anthem" and that it "[coaxed] Selena's spirit"; Morales wrote he "can't seem to get [the song] out of [his] mind." Considine stated that the song "exactly [sounds] like the sort of thing Madonna was doing [in the 1980s] -- right down to the dramatic, throaty vibrato she uses to flesh out the low notes in the chorus." He further insisted that the track "is by no means as danceable as Paula Abdul or Madonna's best; none are as rhythmically insinuating as "Techno Cumbia," one of the album's oldies. But it's no problem that these new tracks prefer perky charm over aggressive, club-savvy grooves, as there's something so straight-laced about Selena's musical persona that it would have seemed out of character for her to have attempted the kind of club-conscious material Madonna [was doing at the time]." Hispanic Today believed the song was "expected to launch her crossover into the pop arena". KOTV-DT stated that the song's "breathy, spoken Spanish aside" "elevates the song from schmaltzy to sexy". Ashley Velez of Neon Tommy called the song "one of the most innocent and most beautiful love songs, maybe ever". in 2014. Josh Cantu of the San Antonio Current said in April 2015, that the track is a "heartfelt song", after Heartfire Media released a tribute video featuring the recording. KUSA TV called it a "breakout song". Emmanuel Hapsis of KQED stated that "pop culture moves at breakneck speed, yet two decades later, Selena's impact is still deeply felt. Just visit any karaoke bar and chances are someone will sing "Dreaming of You" or "Amor Prohibido."

=== Recognition and accolades ===
"Dreaming of You" and "I Could Fall in Love" were EMI Records' top selling digital downloads from April 1, 2004, to March 31, 2005. "Dreaming of You" became one of Selena's most widely recognized recordings. The song won a BMI Pop Music Award for having two million airplay impressions in the United States. "Dreaming of You" was featured on Bruce Pollock's book The 7500 Most Important Songs for the Rock and Roll Era in 2014. The Ellensburg Daily Record named "Dreaming of You" among their list of "The World's Greatest First Dance Songs" for a wedding.

The Los Angeles Times placed "Dreaming of You" at number five out of its top ten singles of 1995. The song was named one of the "Top 500 Love Songs" list compiled by AOL Radio. BuzzFeed placed "Dreaming of You" at number seven on its list of the "15 Greatest Selena Songs Ever" in 2014. OC Weekly place "Dreaming of You" at number 6 on their "Top 10 Selena Songs of All Time" list. Latina magazine placed "Dreaming of You" at number eight on their "Remembering Selena: Her Top Ten Songs" list. Velez of Neon Tommy ranked the recording number three on her list of the "Top 5 Selena Songs".

=== Chart and sales performance ===
The song was played in San Antonio every hour, after its release on radios. "Dreaming of You" sold 25,000 units in its first week of release. According to other sources, it sold between 330,000 and 700,000 copies in its first week. It debuted at number 51 on the US Billboard Hot 100 Single Sales on the week of October 28, 1995, and the following week reached number 24. The song peaked at number 16 on the week of November 11, 1995. On the US Billboard Hot 100 chart dated October 28, 1995, the song debuted at number 38 and a week later on November 4, 1995, reached number 26 which represented the greatest gainer in sales for that week. It later peaked at number 22 on the Hot 100 chart for two consecutive weeks, starting on the week of November 25, 1995. On October 7, 1995, the song debuted at number 25 on the US Billboard Top 40 Mainstream chart. "Dreaming of You" debuted at number 36 on the US Billboard Hot Adult Contemporary chart on the week of December 30, 1995, it fell to number 37 the following week and rose to number 31 a week later. It peaked at number 9 on its eleventh week on the chart on week of March 9, 1996. On the US Hot Latin Songs chart, "Dreaming of You" debuted at number 27 on the week of November 18, 1995. On its third week on the Hot Latin Songs chart, "Dreaming of You" reached number 16 and represented a spike in airplay impressions. The song peaked at number 11 on its sixth week on the Hot Latin Songs chart on the week of December 23, 1995. That same week, the song peaked at number 11 on the US Billboard Tropical Songs chart. On January 13, 1996, "Dreaming of You" peaked at number 9 on the US Billboard Latin Pop Airplay chart. Music stores across the United States were "eager for a followup" after the commercial success of "Dreaming of You".

In Canada, the track debuted at number 57 on the RPM Adult Contemporary chart on the week of December 11, 1995. The following week, the song reached its peak at number 36. The single debuted and peaked at number 93 for two consecutive weeks on the Canadian Top 100 Singles chart, starting on the week of December 11, 1995. In 1996, "Dreaming of You" performed better in Canada on the RPM Adult Contemporary and the Top 100 Singles chart, peaking at numbers seven and 30, respectively. As of 2010, "Dreaming of You" has sold over 254,000 digital copies, according to Nielsen SoundScan. In April 2015, Billboard reported an increase of 133% of streaming data compiled for Selena during her twentieth death anniversary, "Dreaming of You" was the most streamed recording of the singer with 788,000 streams that week.

== Music video ==
The music video for "Dreaming of You", filmed posthumously and released to music channels in 1995, was described by CBS News as being "about a young woman who sneaks away from her home to run off with the man she loves". The video opens up to a girl who overhears a radio announcer (voiced by Charlie Huero of Power 106, who was chosen by EMI Records producer Sean Lynch) relay the premiere of Selena's new single. She then kisses her sleeping father on the head before packing; her mother is seen in the kitchen cleaning and then leaves to the back looking up to the sky. At the end of the video, the girl and her love interest are seen embracing each other before driving away. The radio announcer concludes the video saying, "All right. I know that special someone that's close to your heart, that you've been dreaming about all night, is right next to you right now." The music video reached number 49 on the Billboard Video Monitor VH1 Top Music Videos list on April 18, 1998.

== Notable cover versions ==
=== Live covers ===
- Soraya and American boy band the Barrio Boyzz performed and recorded the song for the April 7, 2005, televised live concert Selena ¡VIVE!.
- In 2013, Carlito Olivero performed the song during his solo performance on the third season of the American music competition show The X Factor.
- In the eighth season of the American music competition show The Voice, Lexi Dávila performed the song. Her rendition received generally negative reviews.
- In 2023, American singer-songwriter Sabrina Carpenter performed the song as a tribute, and was a part of her opening setlist for Taylor Swift on the Mexico City dates of The Eras Tour

== Formats and track listings ==
- US and UK CD and cassette single
1. "Dreaming of You" (radio edit) – 4:15
2. "Dreaming of You" (album version) – 5:15
- Japan maxi single
1. "I Could Fall in Love" – 4:41
2. "Dreaming of You" – 5:14
3. "Sukiyaki" – 3:11
- Mexico CD single
1. "Dreaming of You" (radio edit) – 4:41
2. "Dreaming of You" (album version) – 5:15
3. "Techno Cumbia" (radio edit) – 4:42
4. "Techno Cumbia" (Brazilian nut remix) – 5:58
- Spain CD single
1. "Dreaming of You" (radio edit) – 4:41
2. "Dreaming of You" (album version) – 5:15
3. "Amor Prohibido" – 2:50

- 4:41 (Radio Edit) is the "Album Edit"

== Credits and personnel ==
Credits are adapted from the Dreaming of You album liner notes.

- Franne Golde – songwriter, backing vocals
- Tom Snow – songwriter
- Selena – lead vocals, backing vocals
- Delphine – backing vocals
- Abraham Quintanilla, Jr. – production coordinator
- Guy Roche – drum programming, keyboards, synthesizers, producer
- Marc Antonie – acoustic and electric guitars
- Jimmy Haslip – bass guitar
- Art Meza – percussion
- Mick Guzauski – mixed posthumously at Conway Recording Studios
- Moana Suchard – assistant engineer

== Charts ==
=== Weekly charts ===
Chart (1995–1996)	Peak position
Canada Top Singles (RPM)	30
Canada Adult Contemporary (RPM)	7
US Billboard Hot 100	22
US Adult Contemporary (Billboard)	9
US Adult Pop Airplay (Billboard)	33
US Hot Latin Songs (Billboard)	11
US Pop Airplay (Billboard)	32
US Rhythmic Airplay (Billboard)	10
US Cash Box Top 100	19

Chart (2009)	Peak position
US Hot Ringtones (Billboard)	30

=== Year-end charts ===
Chart (1995)	Position
Brazil (Crowley)	65

Chart (1996)	Position
Canada Adult Contemporary (RPM)	66
US Adult Contemporary (Billboard)	39
US Top 40/Mainstream (Billboard)	97
US Top 40/Rhythm-Crossover (Billboard)	68

== Certifications and sales ==
Region	Certification	Certified units/sales
United States (RIAA)	Gold	500,000^{‡}
Streaming
United States	—	1,788,000
^{‡} Sales+streaming figures based on certification alone.
