= What a Girl Wants (Christina Aguilera song) =

1999 single by Christina Aguilera

Single by Christina Aguilera

from the album Christina Aguilera
- B-side: "Too Beautiful for Words"; "We're a Miracle"; "Genio Atrapado"; "Christina Aguilera Medley"
- Released: September 4, 1999
- Recorded: 1998 (album version); September 1999 (re-recorded version)
- Studio: Bananaboat (Burbank, California)
- Genre: Teen pop; R&B
- Length: 3:52 (original version); 3:20 (radio edit)
- Label: RCA; BMG
- Songwriters: Shelly Peiken; Guy Roche
- Producer: Guy Roche

Christina Aguilera singles chronology
"Genie in a Bottle" (1999)	"What a Girl Wants" (1999)	"I Turn to You" (2000)

Music video
- "What a Girl Wants" on YouTube

"What a Girl Wants" is a cover song by American singer Christina Aguilera from her debut studio album, Christina Aguilera (1999). Written by Shelly Peiken and Guy Roche as "What a Girl Needs", the song was recorded by French singer Ophélie Winter in 1998, with French lyrics adapted by Winter. On her album Privacy the song appeared in English and French (as "Ce Que Je Suis"). The French version was released as a single two years later. In the meantime, the song was pitched by Peiken and Roche to RCA Records. Following a change of the song title to "What a Girl Wants", it was recorded by Aguilera for her eponymous debut album.

The first version of Aguilera's song was released as the album's second single in Japan in 1999, by Arista Records Japan. However, a newly produced re-recorded version was sent to contemporary hit radio in the United States on November 8, and later internationally instead. A Spanish version of the song, titled "Una Mujer", was included on Aguilera's second studio album, Mi Reflejo (2000).

The song was described as a pop and R&B track and had similarities to "Genie in a Bottle". It received positive reviews from music critics, who described it as a "light" song and compared Aguilera's vocals on the track to those of Mariah Carey. It was nominated for Best Female Pop Vocal Performance at the 43rd Grammy Awards. Commercially, the song became her second consecutive US Billboard Hot 100 number-one single, and also topped the charts in Brazil, Canada, New Zealand, and Spain; the song is recognized as the first Billboard Hot 100 number-one single of the 2000s. It also reached the top ten in Belgium, Ireland, and the United Kingdom. The single eventually earned gold certifications in countries including Australia, Belgium and Sweden, as well as being certified platinum by the Recording Industry Association of America (RIAA).

A music video was directed by Diane Martel, who had also directed her previous video for "Genie in a Bottle". The video features Aguilera dancing in a room with female friends whilst being viewed by their boyfriends, and includes a scene where she is dressed as a medieval-style princess. In December 1999, the video reached pole position on the US music video chart TRL. Aguilera has performed the song at events such as the US Jingle Ball and the MTV New Year's Eve Special in 1999, as well as her tours including the Christina Aguilera: In Concert (2000–2001), the Stripped Live... on Tour (2003), the Back to Basics Tour (2006–2008), the Liberation Tour (2018), and most recently on both The X Tour and Christina Aguilera: The Xperience in 2019. In 2024, a cover of "What a Girl Wants" was released featuring Sabrina Carpenter.

== Background ==
After what was described as an "incredible" response to her debut single, the interest in Aguilera began to grow, at which point her record label decided it was time to release a second single. The label and Aguilera disputed over which track should be released, with Aguilera recalling: "You know, some people do want me to stay in the pop scene, [but] I want to grow from there. I always want to continue growing and getting to that level of, 'Oh, she's a real singer, a real ballad-singer, she can do it'." However, the announcement then came that "What a Girl Wants" would be released as the follow-up single, with Aguilera saying "The next single will be 'What a Girl Wants', but a totally cool remix of it". The single was not chosen by Aguilera, but instead her record label RCA and label executive Ron Fair. Aguilera herself had little control over the entire project, and a marketing strategy foresaw that Aguilera would have better success as a "teen idol" so in an effort to maintain her persona, music was chosen and recorded under the basis that she would become the next pop phenomenon.

== Writing and recording ==
"I had a little cassette running, a work tape in case you can't remember something but you know it was good. A lot of hooks come out of making mistakes and then you can't remember what you did. I went home that night and got into bed with my husband. I was listening to our work tape. I knew there was a real gem there in a very raw form that was going to be something one day."

— Writer Peiken talks about the development of the track.

Shelly Peiken was the writer behind "What a Girl Wants". One day the pair were working with a cassette tape, experimenting with vocals and hooks, after which she decided that the work-in-progress had potential and she would return to it at a later date.

"What a Girl Wants" was the first track recorded for Christina Aguilera in June 1998. Fair liked the song and after the decision was made to release it as the second single the label called for a second recording of the track, changing the original key in addition to editing rhythmic changes. The second recording came in September 1999 after the success of her debut single "Genie in a Bottle", with Aguilera's label wanting to produce a similar tone.

Peiken stated that "What a Girl Wants" and "Bitch" — another song co-written by her — were both inspired by the songwriter's relationship with her husband. Peiken went on to add: "They've got a common thread because they're from the same soul."

== Composition ==
"What a Girl Wants"
A 19-second sample of "What a Girl Wants"

"What a Girl Wants" is a teen pop–R&B track with some similarities to her debut single "Genie in a Bottle". Written in the key of C major, the track begins with the lyrics "What a girl wants, what a girl needs, whatever makes me happy sets you free" and is set at a tempo 142 beats per minute. The vocal range is F♯_{3}-E_{6}. Anthony Violanti from Buffalo News described the track as a "light hip-hop song" in comparison to the previous single. Aguilera's vocals have been compared to that of Mariah Carey, with Carey's single "Emotions" being the grounds for these comparisons. In Aguilera's vocal performance she starts singing in a lower register and "carefully" scales notes until she reaches "the highest echelon of her upper register". During the track Aguilera performs the lyrics "A girl needs somebody sensitive but tough, Somebody there when the going get rough." The track that was released as a single was a revised version of the song, it focused more upon the "funky R&B edge", and with Aguilera taking participation in the revision her additions made the track lighter and a mix of "pop and R&B". But despite this Aguilera was disappointed in her lack of input into the single saying;

"I was held back a lot from doing more R&B ad-libbing. They clearly wanted to make a fresh sounding young pop record and that's not always the direction I wanted to go in. Sometimes they didn't get it, didn't want to hear me out because of my age, and that was a little bit frustrating. But I want to write more about experiences I've gone through. I've gone through bad situations. I come from a divorced home. I've been around abuse. I've lived a different life, been on the outside."

== Critical reception ==
Village Voice critic Robert Christgau called "What a Girl Wants" "clever" adding "but in a far less ingratiating way" than "Genie in a Bottle". Anthony Violanti from Buffalo News discussed the success behind the record, citing the formula that incorporated teen idols with R&B and pop music releases; Violanti discussed the track calling it a "light track", and despite saying the track had been "buried in production" he concluded it "has a way of selling a song". In retrospect, Billboard's Kenneth Partridge complimented the re-recorded version of the single as "a little harder and sexier" [than the original], and noted that "it's still pretty airy, but Christina hints at the soulfulness and sensuality she'd explore to greater degrees later on." Chris Malone, also from the Billboard magazine, praised "What a Girl Wants" for its "starry-eyed lyrics" and empowering nature, and summarized it as "quintessential late-90s teen pop". PopMatters editor Kimberley Hill named it a "glittering bubblegum number".

Author Pier Dominquez of A Star is Made called the song "a lightweight but pleasant pop/R&B confection" and stated Aguilera performed "vocal acrobatics" and labelled it a "less effective" Mariah Carey-style vocal performance. Nana-Adwoa Ofori of the AOL Radio blog compiled a list of Aguilera's ten best tracks in which she listed "What a Girl Wants" at number nine, writing: "The huge success of this Christina Aguilera song solidified her as a strong musical force". On a similar list for the Attitude magazine "What a Girl Wants" was ranked at number six; it was praised for Aguilera's "passionate" vocals. Brock Radke from Las Vegas Magazine called it a "classic track". The song was nominated for Best Female Pop Vocal Performance at the 43rd Grammy Awards held on February 21, 2001. Spanish version "Una Mujer" also received positive reviews. Orlando Sentinel editor Parry Gettelman wrote that it holds up to her "out of my way" vocals.

"What a Girl Wants" was Bill Lamb's number ten on the list of the best songs of 2000. Porcys listed it at number thirty-nine in their ranking of the hundred best singles of the 1990s, and called the radio edit the "crowning achievement of bubblegum–R&B music". The song was also included in two books about best of all-time music — The 7,500 Most Important Songs of the Rock and Roll Era: 1944–2000 by Bruce Pollock (2005), and The Little Black Book of Music: Key Songs by Sean Egan (2007).

== Chart performance ==
In the United States, the song spent 24 weeks on the US Billboard Hot 100, during which time it topped the chart, becoming her second consecutive US number one single after topping the chart on the issue date of January 15, 2000, for two consecutive weeks, becoming the first new number-one entry of the 2000s on the Hot 100. On the Billboard component charts, the song peaked at number one on the US Top 40 Mainstream chart, where it spent 26 weeks, and peaked at number 18 on the US Dance Club Play chart, where it spent 11 weeks. The single was certified platinum by the Recording Industry Association of America (RIAA) and has sold over 600,000 pure units in the US as of 2012.

In Oceania, the song performed well. In Australia, the track debuted at number 21 on the issue date of January 9, 2000, where it stayed for a further week. For the next two weeks the single rose up the charts before making its peak at number five on the charts. The track spent a total of 18 weeks on the chart, five of which were spent within the top ten. In New Zealand, the song debuted at number 39 on the singles chart, before jumping to number two the following week. In its third week the track topped the chart on the issue date of February 6, 2000, the single fell to number two the following week, before making its second run at number one on February 20, 2000, and once again falling to number two. On the issue date of March 3, 2000, the track made its third run at number one spending three weeks atop the chart before falling to number three spending a total of 13 weeks on the chart.

In Europe, the song became a number one single in Spain. After debuting at number three, the song topped the chart in its second week on the issue date of January 29, 2000, where it spent just one week before returning to number three and spent eight weeks on the chart. In the United Kingdom, the song debuted and peaked at number three on the issue date of February 26, 2000, the song spent two weeks inside the top ten and thirteen weeks on the chart. In Sweden, the song was certified Gold after spending twelve weeks on the chart and in its seventh week it made its peak at number 24 where it spent two weeks before falling out of the chart four weeks later. The song was also certified Gold in Belgium, after debuting at number 40 on the Flanders chart on the issue date of January 1, 2000, and after spending six weeks on the chart it entered the top ten at number nine before making its peak of number eight where it remained for three weeks. On the Wallonia charts, the song also debuted at number 40 and on its sixth week in the chart it made its peak of number 16 spending just that one week inside the top 20.

The single was also successful in Mexico, where it reached number six on the international music chart (as reported by El Siglo de Torreón). It was a top 10 year-end hit in Brazil in 2000, reaching number seven on a list compiled by Crowley Broadcast Analysis (while also being a number one song during the year).

== Music video ==
=== Production ===
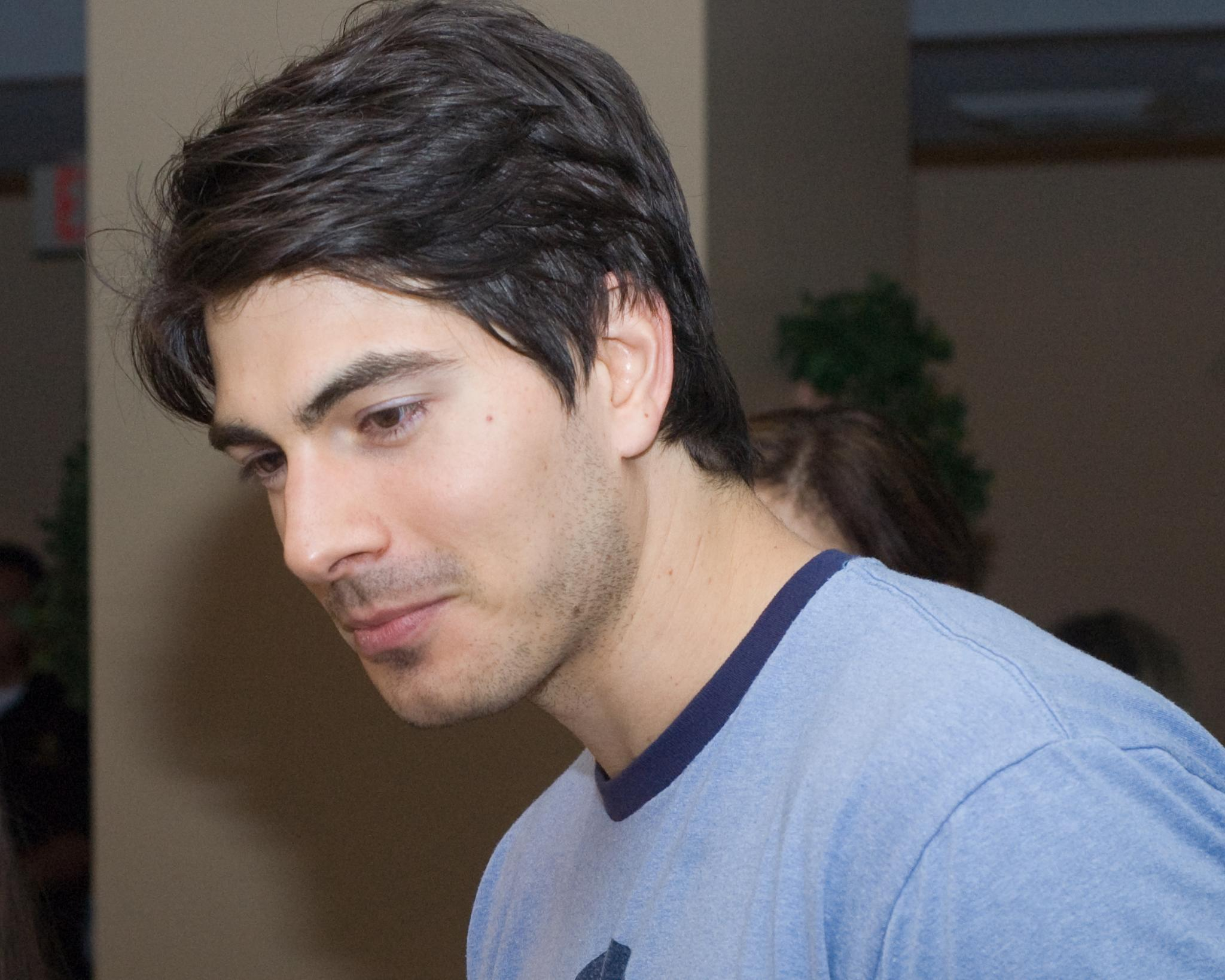
Brandon Routh has a role as an extra in the video.

Diane Martel, who had also directed the music video for her previous single "Genie in a Bottle", directed the music video for "What a Girl Wants", with Tina Landon providing choreography. It was filmed in July 18-20 1999 Downtown Los Angeles, at the same location Paula Abdul's video "Cold Hearted" was filmed at in 1989. Notably, the lighting in the video was more "defined" than the previous single's allowing a "clearer view" of Aguilera. The video's narrative, featuring protagonists Aguilera and model Paul Forgues, unwinds as a performance given by Aguilera to thank her lover.

An opening shot shows a group of young men cycling and DJing. Aguilera's troupe enters, moves the young men towards the far-end of the room, and, after asking Forgues and the other men to cover their eyes, breaks into a tightly choreographed dance as Aguilera introduces the song's hook. Solo shots of Aguilera seated atop speakers punctuate the dance sequence. As the dance sequence in the first room ends, the camera moves over the ceiling of the venue and cuts to Aguilera dressed in medieval garb lying on a chaise longue whilst women dance around her with fans. After the bridge section finishes the video cuts back to the dancers in the first room and the video ends with a bird-eye-view shot of everyone in the room surrounding Aguilera and Forgues who are intimately dancing.

Actor and model Brandon Routh also appeared in the video as an extra. The video made its debut on MTV the week ending on November 14, 1999. On December 16, 1999, the music video reached pole position on the music video chart, TRL. It received heavy rotation on VH1 and was the most played video on MTV for six straight weeks. Aguilera received five nominations for the 2000 MTV Video Music Awards including Best Female Video, Best New Artist in a Video, Best Pop Video, Best Choreography in a Video and Viewer's Choice.

== Live performances ==
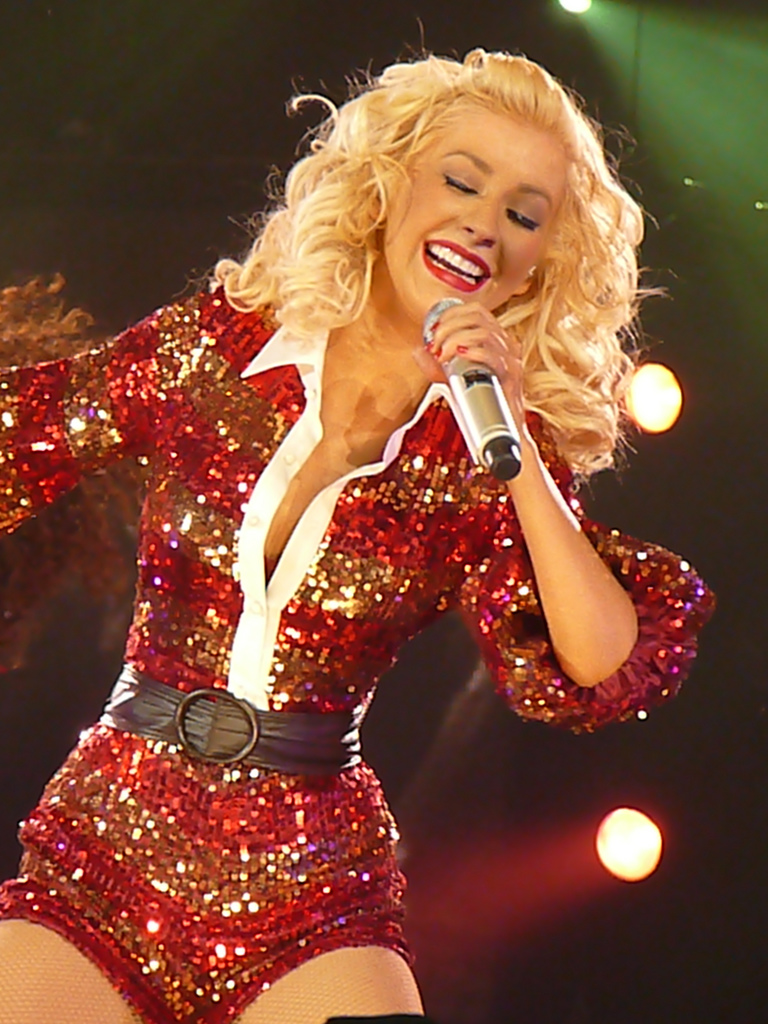
Aguilera performing the song during her Back to Basics Tour

Aguilera performed the track during the promotional campaign of Christina Aguilera. Aguilera performed the track at Franklin High, a Milwaukee high school; the performance saw her live in front of 1,300 teenagers in a set list that consisted of three tracks: "Genie in a Bottle", "The Christmas Song" and "What a Girl Wants". Aguilera performed the song on the Jingle Ball for radio station Kiss 108 just days after the release of the music video, continuing promotion for the album. Later in December 1999, Aguilera was chosen to perform on MTV's live New Year's Eve Special, which she commented on beforehand, saying "I'm nervous about what's going to go on that night. Everything's going to be so chaotic", wearing tight leather pants. Aguilera started with a performance of "Genie in a Bottle", continuing into "What a Girl Wants". Aguilera performed the song during the time in which she supported the band TLC on their FanMail Tour. She also performed the song at the American Music Awards in a medley with the third single from Christina Aguilera, "I Turn to You"; wearing a "tummy-baring bodice", she removed the skirt before performing "What a Girl Wants" in the medley-style performance.

Aguilera performed the track on the VH1 special Men Strike Back, where she once again performed a medley of "I Turn to You" and "What a Girl Wants"; she entered the stage "amid total darkness" with a spotlight aiming at her wearing a black suit. VH1 critic Michael Hill positively commented on her performance, writing "Young Christina Aguilera has a set of diva's pipes already and can cram more notes into a single line than a trio of Mariah's. Though she delivered hits, 'I Turn to You' and 'What a Girl Wants,' with great technical prowess, the real surprise of her set was a rendition of the pre-rock'n'roll-era pop standard 'At Last' with a small jazz combo". After performing with TLC, Aguilera announced her debut headlining tour, Christina Aguilera in Concert, in which she performed "What a Girl Wants" which she dedicated to the female fans in the audience saying "Girls, I hope you're getting everything you want".

In 2000, Aguilera performed the track on the ABC Christmas Special with "carefully choreographed" dance routines, she sang eight songs, including "Gene in a Bottle" and "I Turn to You" ending the special with a performance of "Climb Ev'ry Mountain". She also sang "What a Girl Wants" on the British television chart show Top of the Pops, and on the Hit Machine in France. She performed the song on Stripped Live... on Tour and it was included on her video release of the concert tour titled Stripped Live in the U.K. which was filmed live in London's Wembley Arena. She also performed the track on her following concert tour titled the Back to Basics Tour; the track was featured on the live video release of the show titled Back to Basics: Live and Down Under. In 2010, while promoting her sixth studio album, Bionic, on The Early Show, she performed the track in a medley with her debut single "Genie in a Bottle" after a performance of her single "Not Myself Tonight". CBS News commented that the performance was commended by fans.

In July 2021, Aguilera performed the reggaeton version of the song at the Hollywood Bowl with Gustavo Dudamel and the Los Angeles Philharmonic. In November 2024, Aguilera sang "What a Girl Wants" along with Sabrina Carpenter at her Short n' Sweet Tour show at the Crypto.com Arena.

== Covers and legacy ==
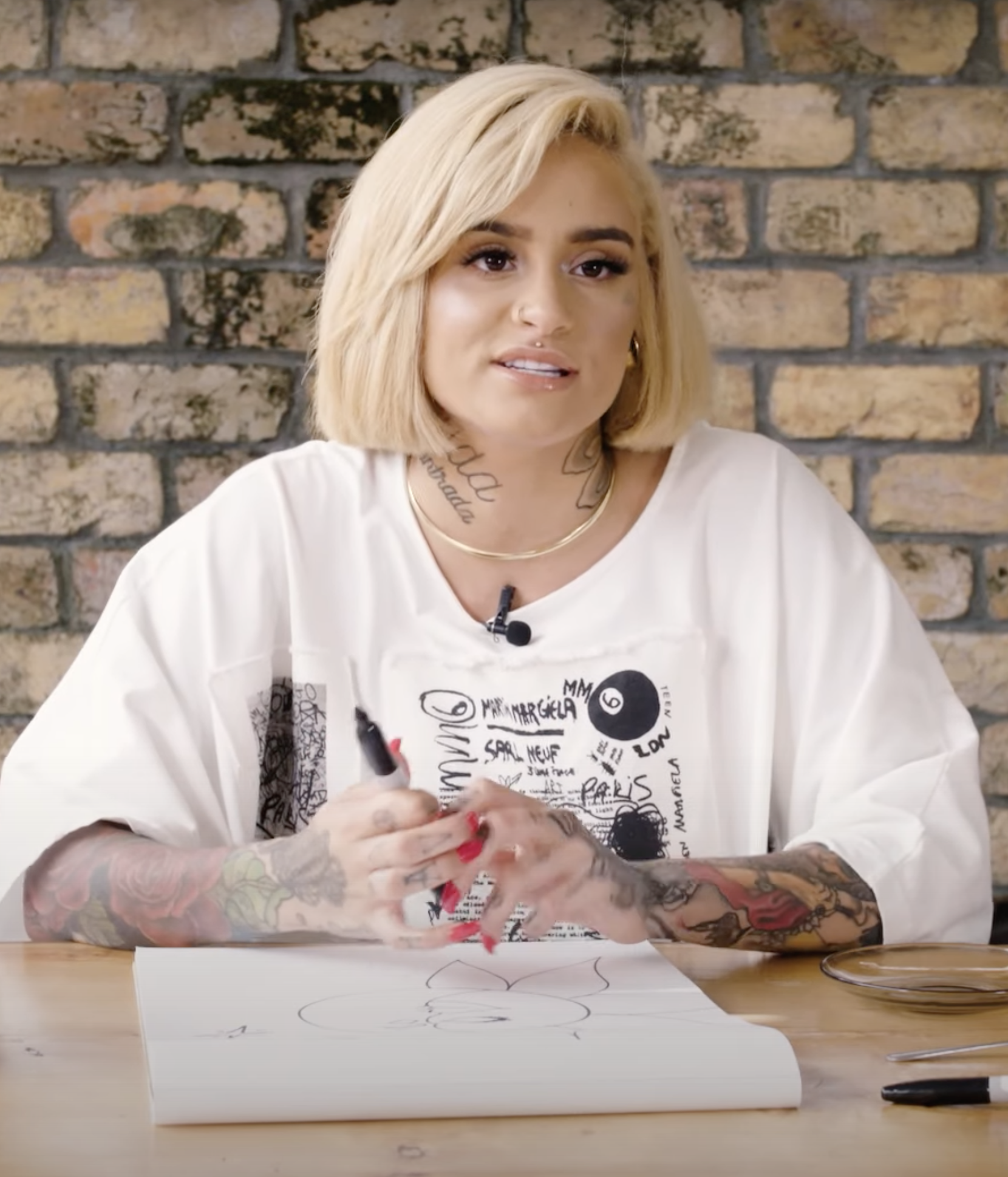
Kehlani's song "What I Want" from her album Crash samples Aguilera's single.

In 2009, the song was covered by Lea Michele in "Mash-Up" — an episode of the American TV series Glee. Kelly Clarkson covered the song in her own talk show in April 2021.

Prince praised Aguilera after hearing the song, and Bart Herbison, the executive director of the Nashville Songwriters Association International, named "What a Girl Wants" "phenomenal", adding: "I think it's one of those songs that’s part of our culture". StyleCaster echoed this opinion, hailing the track as a "classic". "What a Girl Wants" inspired the title of the 2000 romantic comedy film What Women Want, having the track on its soundtrack and on a scene. It also inspired the title of the 2003 comedy film of the same name. The song appears in the video game Karaoke Revolution Presents: American Idol (2007).

Cashmere Cat sampled "What a Girl Wants" in his song "Watergirl", from the 2019 album Princess Catgirl. An advertisement for AT&T that has run during the 2024 NBA Playoffs features Oklahoma City Thunder players Shai Gilgeous-Alexander and Chet Holmgren performing the song as "What a Pro Wants". Kehlani's track "What I Want" from her 2024 album Crash samples the hook from Aguilera's "What a Girl Wants". Billboard magazine thought the sample was "inspired". In September 2024, a cover of the song was released on EP titled The 25th Anniversary of Christina Aguilera (Spotify Anniversaries Live). It featured American singer Sabrina Carpenter. Euphoria Magazine positively reviewed the song, noting that "not only does this reimagination of the track bring new light to the ’90s hit song, but also brings a sense of positivity for women in an industry known to be very male-dominated."

== Awards and nominations ==
Year	Ceremony	Category	Result	Ref.
2000	Teen Choice Awards	Choice Music – Single	Nominated	
2000	Teen Entertainment Awards	Best Girl Power Song	Won	
2000	Teen Entertainment Awards	Best Song to Listen to While Kissing Your Boyfriend	Nominated	
2001	BMI Pop Awards	Most Performed Song	Won	
2001	Grammy Awards	Best Female Pop Vocal Performance	Nominated	
2025	Webby Awards	Best Individual Performance – Performance & Craft (For a cover version recorded with Sabrina Carpenter)	Nominated	

== Track listings and formats ==
- Japanese CD single
1. "What a Girl Wants" (album version) – 3:52
2. "Genie in a Bottle" – 3:36
3. "Genie in a Bottle" (The Eddie Arroyo rhythm mix) – 4:28
- UK CD single 1
1. "What a Girl Wants" (radio edit) – 3:22
2. "What a Girl Wants" (smooth mix) – 3:20
3. "Christina Aguilera medley" ("I Turn To You", "So Emotional", "Somebody's Somebody", "Genie in a Bottle", "Come On Over") snippets of album – 4:55
- UK CD single 2
1. "What a Girl Wants" (radio edit) – 3:22
2. "We're a Miracle" – 4:09
3. "What a Girl Wants" (video enhancement) – 4:06
- UK cassette single
1. "What a Girl Wants" (radio edit) – 3:20
2. "Christina Aguilera medley" ("I Turn To You", "So Emotional", "Somebody's Somebody", "Genie in a Bottle", "Come On Over") snippets of album – 4:55
- Australian maxi-CD single
1. "What a Girl Wants" (radio edit) – 3:22
2. "What a Girl Wants" (smooth mix) – 3:20
3. "Too Beautiful for Words" – 4:11
- US CD single
1. "What a Girl Wants" (radio edit) – 3:20
2. "We're a Miracle" – 4:10
- US remix single
1. "What a Girl Wants" (Thunderpuss Fiesta club mix) – 6:16
2. "What a Girl Wants" (Thunderpuss Dirty club mix) – 6:36
3. "What a Girl Wants" (Eddie Arroyo long dance mix) – 8:10
4. "What a Girl Wants" (Eddie Arroyo tempo mix) – 4:11

== Charts ==
=== Weekly charts ===
Chart (1999–2000)	Peak position
Australia (ARIA)	5
Austria (Ö3 Austria Top 40)	22
Belgium (Ultratop 50 Flanders)	8
Belgium (Ultratop 50 Wallonia)	5
Canada Top Singles (RPM)	1
Canada Adult Contemporary (RPM)	3
Canada CHR (Nielsen BDS)	1
Czech Republic (Rádio – Top 100)	22
Europe (Eurochart Hot 100)	8
European Radio Top 50 (Music & Media)	1
Finland (Suomen virallinen lista)	12
France (SNEP)	11
France Airplay (SNEP)	5
Germany (GfK)	18
Hungary Airplay (HCRA)	19
Iceland (Íslenski Listinn Topp 20)	15
Ireland (IRMA)	7
Italy (FIMI)	17
Italy (Music & Media)	6
Mexico International (Notimex)	6
Netherlands (Dutch Top 40)	9
Netherlands (Single Top 100)	14
Netherlands Airplay (Music & Media)	5
New Zealand (Recorded Music NZ)	1
Scottish Singles Sales (Official Charts)	8
Spain (Promusicae)	1
Sweden (Sverigetopplistan)	24
Switzerland (Schweizer Hitparade)	17
UK Singles (Official Charts)	3
US Billboard Hot 100	1
US Adult Pop Airplay (Billboard)	31
US Bubbling Under R&B/Hip-Hop Songs (Billboard)	1
US Dance Club Songs (Billboard)	18
US Dance Singles Sales (Billboard)	2
US Pop Airplay (Billboard)	1
US Rhythmic Airplay (Billboard)	1
US Top 40 Tracks (Billboard)	1
US CHR/Pop Airplay (Radio & Records)	1

=== Year-end charts ===
Chart (2000)	Position
Australia (ARIA)	74
Belgium (Ultratop 50 Flanders)	66
Belgium (Ultratop 50 Wallonia)	87
Brazilian Airplay (Crowley)	7
Europe (Eurochart Hot 100)	62
France (SNEP)	95
Iceland (Íslenski Listinn Topp 40)	68
Ireland (IRMA)	92
Netherlands (Dutch Top 40)	56
Netherlands (Single Top 100)	98
New Zealand (RIANZ)	32
Switzerland (Schweizer Hitparade)	84
UK Singles (OCC)	88
US Billboard Hot 100	19
US Adult Top 40 (Billboard)	100
US Mainstream Top 40 (Billboard)	9
US Maxi-Singles Sales (Billboard)	9
US Rhythmic Top 40 (Billboard)	8

== Certifications ==
Region	Certification	Certified units/sales
Australia (ARIA)	Gold	35,000^{^}
Belgium (BRMA)	Gold	25,000^{*}
Canada (Music Canada)	Gold	40,000^{‡}
New Zealand (RMNZ)	Gold	5,000^{*}
New Zealand (RMNZ) digital	Gold	15,000^{‡}
Sweden (GLF)	Gold	15,000^{^}
United Kingdom (BPI)	Silver	200,000^{‡}
United States (RIAA)	Platinum	1,000,000^{‡}
^{*} Sales figures based on certification alone.^{^} Shipments figures based on certification alone.^{‡} Sales+streaming figures based on certification alone.

== Release history ==
Release dates and formats for "What a Girl Wants"
Region	Date	Format(s)	Label(s)	Ref.
Japan	September 4, 1999	Maxi CD	Arista	
United States	November 8, 1999	Contemporary hit radio	RCA	
Germany	December 13, 1999	Maxi CD	BMG	
Sweden	December 13, 1999	Maxi CD	RCA	
United States	December 21, 1999	Cassette; CD	RCA	
Canada	December 28, 1999	CD	—	
France	January 3, 2000	Maxi CD	BMG	
United Kingdom	February 14, 2000	CD	RCA	
France	February 22, 2000	CD	BMG	

== Sources ==
- Bronson, Fred (2003). The Billboard Book of Number 1 Hits. Billboard Books. ISBN 0-8230-7677-6.
- Dominguez, Pier (2003). Christina Aguilera: A Star is Made: The Unauthorized Biography. Amber Communications Group, Inc. ISBN 978-0-970-222-459.
