= You Wouldn't Know Love =

Single by Cher

from the album Heart of Stone
- B-side: "Kiss to Kiss"
- Released: July 1990
- Recorded: 1989
- Genre: Hard rock
- Length: 3:30
- Label: Geffen
- Songwriters: Michael Bolton; Diane Warren
- Producer: Michael Bolton

Cher singles chronology
| "Heart of Stone" (1990) | "You Wouldn't Know Love" (1990) | "Baby I'm Yours" (1990) |

"You Wouldn't Know Love" is a song written by Michael Bolton and Diane Warren appearing in 1989 on Bolton's Soul Provider album and Cher's Heart of Stone album. The song was only released as a single in Europe and Australasia by Cher in 1990. Cher's version of the song was produced by Bolton. It was a minor success in the UK, faring better in Ireland. Michael Landau played the guitar solo in the middle of the song on both Cher and Bolton’s versions of the song.

== Critical reception ==
The Daily Vault's Mark Millan stated, "Another gem on the record is the rocker "You Wouldn't Know Love" that keeps the momentum running superbly." David Giles from Music Week wrote that it "is a lot more steadfastly MOR and what you'd expect considering that Michael Bolton co-wrote and produced it. Probably a substantial hit."

== Charts ==
| Chart (1990) | Peak position |
|---|---|
| Australia (ARIA) | 153 |
| Ireland (IRMA) | 29 |
| UK Singles (Official Charts) | 55 |

== Track listing ==
- European 7-inch single
1. "You Wouldn't Know Love" – 3:28
2. "Kiss to Kiss" – 4:22
- European 12-inch and CD single
1. "You Wouldn't Know Love"
2. "Kiss to Kiss"
3. "Bang-Bang"
4. "Heart of Stone" (Remix)
- UK limited 7-inch EP
1. "You Wouldn't Know Love"
2. "If I Could Turn Back Time" (Remix)
3. "I Found Someone"
4. "We All Sleep Alone" (Remix)

== Personnel ==
- Vocals: Cher
- Drums: John Keane
- Bass: Neil Stubenhaus
- Keyboards: Phillip Ashley
- Guitars: Mike Landau

== Michael Bolton version ==
Bolton's own version appeared on his album, Soul Provider, which peaked at number 3 on the Billboard albums chart. The album was certified 6× Platinum by the RIAA in 1994.

=== Personnel ===
- Michael Bolton: vocals
- Kyf Brewer, Joe Cerisano, Desmond Child, Patricia Darcy, John Fiore, Kate McGunnigle, Lou Merlino, Myriam Naomi Valle: backing vocals
- Michael Landau: lead guitar
- John McCurry: rhythm guitar
- Walter Afanasieff: keyboards, percussion
- Michael Omartian: keyboards, drums, percussion
- Gregg Mangiafico: keyboards
- Eric Rehl: synthesizers
- Hugh McDonald: bass guitar
- Bobby Chouinard: drums
