= Heart of Stone (Cher album) =

1989 album by Cher

- Most widely-distributed cover, particularly for CD releases and re-issues

Studio album by Cher
- Released: July 10, 1989
- Recorded: 1988–1989
- Studios: Summa Music Group; Criterion Studios (Hollywood); Studio Ultimo; Electric Lady Studios; Ignited Perduction; Bill Schnee Studios; Ocean Way Recording; Lion Share Recording Studios; The Village Recorder; Bearsville Studios; Cherokee Studios; The Power Station; The Lighthouse; The Hop; The Hit Factory; RPM Studios; Right Track Recording; Paradise Studios; The Complex; Conway Studios; Devonshire Sound Studios
- Genres: Pop rock; hard rock; rock
- Length: 47:46
- Label: Geffen
- Producers: Peter Asher; Michael Bolton; Desmond Child; Jon Lind; Diane Warren; Guy Roche

Cher chronology
Cher (1987)	Heart of Stone (1989)	Love Hurts (1991)

Alternative cover
- Cover for most vinyl and cassette releases

Singles from Heart of Stone
- 1. "After All" Released: March 1989; 2. "If I Could Turn Back Time" Released: June 1989; 3. "Just Like Jesse James" Released: October 1989; 4. "Heart of Stone" Released: January 1990; 5. "You Wouldn't Know Love" Released: July 1990

Heart of Stone is the nineteenth studio album by American singer-actress Cher, released on July 10, 1989, by Geffen Records. As of January 1991, the album had sold more than 4 million copies worldwide. The album was supported by Cher's 1989–1990 Heart of Stone Tour.

== Background ==
Heart of Stone was released in 1989 and was Cher's second studio album for Geffen Records. As with her previous album Cher (1987), Peter Asher, Jon Bon Jovi, Diane Warren, Guy Roche and Desmond Child performed songwriting and/or producing duties. Bonnie Tyler and Michael Bolton performed background vocals on the song "Emotional Fire", which was an outtake from Bolton's 1987 album The Hunger, as was "Starting Over" (Demo versions of both songs exist in bootleg form, and have surfaced on YouTube). The album was recorded in late 1988/early 1989, during the third year of Cher's relationship with Rob Camilletti, to whom she dedicated the album.

The original front cover album art is a painting by Octavio Ocampo that features Cher sitting beside a stone heart. However, when examined in its entirety and from a distance, it is clear this is also a painting of a human skull in profile (note the midriff folds in her dress forming the teeth; see infobox picture). The artwork was changed shortly after its release with more conventional studio photos, making copies with the original artwork collector's items.

Cher recorded two other songs for the album, "Don't Come Cryin' to Me" and "Some Guys", but neither made the final cut. A remixed version of "Don't Come Cryin' to Me" was included on the Geffen compilation album If I Could Turn Back Time: Cher's Greatest Hits. The reissue of that album, per Cher's request, does not include the song. A demo version of "Some Guys" was included on the "If I Could Turn Back Time" 7- and 12-inch singles.

"Heart of Stone" and "If I Could Turn Back Time" were both slightly remixed for single release. The "Heart of Stone" remix is available on CD on the compilation If I Could Turn Back Time: Cher's Greatest Hits issued by Geffen Records.

"After All" was used as the love theme for the film Chances Are.

== Critical reception ==
Professional ratings
Review scores
Source	Rating
AllMusic	4/5 stars

Billboard predicted that Heart of Stone would repeat the success of Cher's previous Geffen album, describing it as a "well-crafted follow-up", highlighting "If I Could Turn Back Time" as "a suitably lush-voiced starter for radio", and suggesting that "You Wouldn't Know Love" and the title track would be strong follow-up singles, concluding that "the lady's hot career probably won't simmer down with this one".

AllMusic described Heart of Stone as "one of Cher's strongest" albums, praising its "honesty and gritty edge", "strong songwriting", and Cher's "strength of the vocal performance", while noting that, although its sound "seems a bit dated in retrospect", it remains distinguished by its "performance and musical integrity".

== Commercial performance ==
Heart of Stone reached number ten on the United States Billboard 200, number seven on the UK Singles Chart, and topped the charts in Australia, Heart of Stone became Geffen's first international number-one album. It was Cher's first solo album in the United States (Sonny & Cher's debut album Look at Us reached number two and stayed there for eight weeks) to reach the top 10. Further on in her career, she would go on to have five more top ten albums – Believe, Living Proof, The Very Best of Cher, Closer to the Truth and Dancing Queen. The album has sold more than three million copies in the United States, with 964,000 of those units sold since early 1991, according to Nielsen SoundScan, which began counting actual sales that same year.

The album produced three top-10 hits on the Billboard Hot 100 as well as a top-20 hit with the title track.

== Track listing ==
Heart of Stone track listing
No.	Title	Writer(s)	Producer(s)	Length
1.	"If I Could Turn Back Time"	Diane Warren	Warren; Guy Roche	4:00
2.	"Just Like Jesse James"	Warren; Desmond Child	Child	4:06
3.	"You Wouldn't Know Love"	Warren; Michael Bolton	Bolton	3:30
4.	"Heart of Stone"	Andy Hill; Pete Sinfield	Peter Asher	4:17
5.	"Still in Love with You"	Bolton; Bob Halligan	Bolton	3:08
6.	"Love on a Rooftop"	Warren; Child	Asher	4:26
7.	"Emotional Fire"	Warren; Child; Bolton	Child	3:56
8.	"All Because of You"	Jon Lind; Sue Schifrin	Lind	3:30
9.	"Does Anybody Really Fall in Love Anymore?"	Warren; Child; Jon Bon Jovi; Richie Sambora	Child	4:16
10.	"Starting Over"	Bolton; Jonathan Cain	Bolton	4:09
11.	"Kiss to Kiss"	Lind; Mary D'astugues; Phil Galdston	Lind	4:23
12.	"After All" (with Peter Cetera; love theme from Chances Are)	Tom Snow; Dean Pitchford	Asher	4:05

== Personnel ==
- Cher – vocals
- Alan Pasqua – keyboards (1)
- Guy Roche – keyboards (1), additional keyboards (3)
- Alan St. Jon – keyboards (2, 9)
- Phillip Ashley – keyboards (3, 5, 10), bass (10)
- Robbie Buchanan – keyboards (4, 6, 12), additional keyboards (10)
- Jon Gilutin – keyboards (4, 6, 12)
- Eric Rehl – synthesizers (7)
- John Andrew Schreiner – acoustic piano (8), synthesizers (8), keyboards (11)
- Jim Lang – additional synthesizers (8)
- Steve Lukather – guitars (1), additional guitars (7)
- Gene Black – additional guitars (1)
- Glenn Sciurba – additional guitars (1)
- John McCurry – guitars (2, 5, 7, 9)
- John Putnam – acoustic guitar (2), electric guitar (2)
- Michael Landau – guitars (3–5, 10, 12)
- Waddy Wachtel – guitars (4, 6, 12)
- Andrew Gold – acoustic guitar (4, 6), 12-string guitar (4), backing vocals (4)
- Blues Saraceno – additional guitars (7)
- Michael Thompson – guitars (8, 11)
- Ron Mancuso – guitars (9)
- John Pierce – bass (1, 8, 11)
- Hugh McDonald – bass (2, 7, 9)
- Neil Stubenhaus – bass (3, 5)
- Leland Sklar – bass (4, 6, 12)
- Mark T. Williams – drums (1), tambourine (1)
- Bobby Chouinard – drums (2, 7, 9)
- John Keane – drums (3, 5, 8, 10, 11)
- Carlos Vega – drums (4, 6, 12)
- Michael Fisher – percussion (4, 6)
- Peter Asher – percussion (6)
- Bashiri Johnson – percussion (10)
- Debra Dobkin – percussion (11)
- Dan Higgins – saxophone (6)
- David Campbell – string arrangements and conductor (6, 12)
- Michael Anthony – backing vocals (1)
- Robin Beck – backing vocals (1)
- Desmond Child – backing vocals (1, 2, 9)
- Jimmy Demers – backing vocals (1, 7)
- Jean McClain – backing vocals (1)
- Maria Vidal – backing vocals (1)
- Brenda Russell – backing vocals (2)
- Diane Warren – backing vocals (2)
- Pattie Darcy – backing vocals (3, 5, 10)
- John Fiore – backing vocals (3, 7, 9)
- Myriam Valle – backing vocals (3, 7, 9, 10)
- Peter Blakeley – backing vocals (4)
- Wendy Matthews – backing vocals (4)
- Suzie Benson – backing vocals (5)
- Kyle Gordon – backing vocals (5)
- Wendy Fraser – backing vocals (6)
- Pauline Frenchette – backing vocals (6)
- Stephanie Spruill – backing vocals (6)
- Michael Bolton – backing vocals (7)
- Louis Merlino – backing vocals (7, 9)
- Bonnie Tyler – backing vocals (7)
- Gene Miller – backing vocals (8, 11)
- Jason Scheff – backing vocals (8)
- Jon Lind – backing vocals (8, 11)
- Vicki Sue Robinson – backing vocals (10)
- Peter Cetera – vocals (12)

=== Production ===
- Frank Wolf – associate producer (12)
- Debra Shallman – album coordinator
- Melanie F. Williams – album coordinator
- Cathy Woller – production coordination assistant
- Norman Moore – art direction, design
- Gabrielle Raumberger – art direction (alternate cover)
- Kevin Takishita – art direction, logo design (alternate cover)
- Herb Ritts – photography
- Octavio Ocampo – cover painting (alternate cover)

Technical

- John Golden – mastering at K Disc Mastering (Hollywood, California)
- David Donnelly – mastering supervisor
- Frank Wolf – recording (1, 3–6, 10, 12), mixing (1, 4, 6, 12), additional engineer (8, 11)
- Sir Arthur Payson – recording (2, 7, 9), mixing (7, 9)
- Mick Guzauski – mixing (2, 3, 5, 8, 10, 11), recording (8, 11)
- Guy Roche – additional engineer (1)
- Bruce Robb – additional engineer (2, 9)
- Terry Christian – additional engineer (3, 5, 10)
- Jay Healy – additional engineer (3, 5, 10)
- Roger Talkov – additional engineer (3, 5, 10)
- Tom Perme – drum technician (6)
- Paul Klingberg – additional engineer (8, 11)
- Ken Allardyce, Stacy Baird, Tom Biener, Charlie Brocco, George Cowan, Bridget Daly, Jeff DeMorris, Ryan Dorn, Ben Fowler, Paula "Max" Garcia, Clark Germaine, Keith Goldstein, Larry Goodwin, Rob Hart, John Herman, Debbie Johnson, Mike Krowiak, Robin Laine, Jay Lean, Tim Leitner, Paul Logus, Mario Luccy, Richard McKernan, Barbara Milne, Joe Pirrera, Charley Pollard, Craig Porteils, Ray Pyle, Duane Seykora, Dary Sulich, Rich Travali and Jeff Welch – assistant engineers

== Charts ==
=== Weekly charts ===
Weekly chart performance for Heart of Stone
Chart (1989–1990)	Peak position
Australian Albums (ARIA)	1
Austrian Albums (Ö3 Austria)	15
Canadian Albums (The Record)	10
Canadian Albums (RPM)	17
Dutch Albums (Album Top 100)	67
European Albums (Top 100)	18
German Albums (Offizielle Top 100)	19
New Zealand Albums (RMNZ)	7
Quebec Albums (ADISQ)	21
Swedish Albums (Sverigetopplistan)	19
UK Albums (Official Charts)	7
US Billboard 200	10
US Cash Box Top 200 Albums	10

=== Year-end charts ===
1989 year-end chart performance for Heart of Stone
Chart (1989)	Position
Australian Albums (ARIA)	32
Canadian Albums (RPM)	68
US Billboard 200	80
US Cash Box Top 50 Pop Albums	42

1990 year-end chart performance for Heart of Stone
Chart (1990)	Position
Australian Albums (ARIA)	40
Canadian Albums (RPM)	78
European Top 100 Albums	58
New Zealand (RMNZ)	35
UK Albums (OCC)	31
US Billboard 200	43

== Certifications and sales ==
Certifications and sales for Heart of Stone
Region	Certification	Certified units/sales
Australia (ARIA)	4× Platinum	280,000^{^}
Canada (Music Canada)	4× Platinum	400,000^{^}
New Zealand (RMNZ)	Platinum	15,000^{^}
Sweden (GLF)	Gold	50,000^{^}
United Kingdom (BPI)	Platinum	300,000^{^}
United States (RIAA)	3× Platinum	3,000,000^{^}
^{^} Shipments figures based on certification alone.
