= Love and Understanding =

1991 single by Cher

Single by Cher

from the album Love Hurts
- B-side: "Trail of Broken Hearts"
- Released: May 21, 1991
- Studio: A&M (Hollywood, California); Music Grinder (Los Angeles, California); The Complex (Los Angeles, California)
- Genre: Pop
- Length: 4:43 (album version); 4:08 (7-inch edit)
- Label: Geffen
- Songwriter: Diane Warren
- Producers: Diane Warren; Guy Roche

Cher singles chronology
"The Shoop Shoop Song (It's in His Kiss)" (1990)	"Love and Understanding" (1991)	"Save Up All Your Tears" (1991)

Music video
- "Love and Understanding" on YouTube

"Love and Understanding" is a song by American singer and actress Cher from her 20th studio album, Love Hurts (1991). Written by Diane Warren and produced by Warren and Guy Roche, it was released as the album's lead single in May 1991 by Geffen Records for the North American and Oceanian markets. B-side "Trail of Broken Hearts" appears on the soundtrack to the Tom Cruise film Days of Thunder and is not available on any Cher album.

== Critical reception ==
AllMusic's Joseph McCombs highlighted the song and called it "pleasantly melodic." Larry Flick from Billboard magazine described it as "a spirited pop tune that's framed with orchestral synth/strings and a hand-clapping rock beat. Simplistic lyrical message is delivered with warmth and sincerity. Sounds great on a summer day." Entertainment Weekly editor Jim Farber said it is "socially conscious in a way only Hollywood could conceive, tailor-made for one of those publicity-seeking charity functions."

== Music video ==
The single's music video showed Cher and her backing band rehearsing the song, with interlocking scenes of her in an orange colored wig and her dancers dancing around her.

== Personnel ==
- Cher: Vocals
- Jean McClain, Myriam Valle, Laura Creamer, Diane Warren: Backing vocals
- Michael Landau, Josh Sklair: Guitars
- Guy Roche: Keyboards, synthesizers
- Mark T. Williams: Drums

== Production ==
- Produced by Diane Warren and Guy Roche
- Recorded by David Thoener and Frank Wolf at A&M Recording Studios, The Music Grinder and The Complex
- Assistant engineers: Mario Luccy, Ken Allardyce, Julie Last, Jeff DeMorris, Fred Kelly
- Mixed by David Thoener

== Track listings ==
- US 7-inch and cassette single
1. "Love and Understanding" – 4:43
2. "Trail of Broken Hearts" – 4:30
- US and European 12-inch single
1. "Love and Understanding" (12-inch dance mix) – 5:25
2. "Love and Understanding" (Stringappella mix) – 4:20
3. "Love and Understanding" (Dub and Understanding mix) – 5:35
4. "Love and Understanding" (House of Love mix) – 5:45
5. "Love and Understanding" (Cher Some Love dub) – 4:10
6. "Trail of Broken Hearts" – 4:30
- European 7-inch and cassette single
1. "Love and Understanding" (edit) – 4:08
2. "Trail of Broken Hearts" – 4:30
- European CD single
1. "Love and Understanding" (edit) – 4:08
2. "Trail of Broken Hearts" – 4:30
3. "If I Could Turn Back Time" – 4:16

== Charts ==
=== Weekly charts ===
1991–1992 weekly chart performance for "Love and Understanding"
Chart (1991–1992)	Peak position
Australia (ARIA)	23
Austria (Ö3 Austria Top 40)	6
Belgium (Ultratop 50 Flanders)	9
Canada Top Singles (RPM)	11
Canada Adult Contemporary (RPM)	5
Canada (The Record)	16
Europe (European Hot 100 Singles)	18
Europe (European Hit Radio)	2
France (SNEP)	21
Germany (Official German Charts)	20
Ireland (IRMA)	7
Israel (Israeli Singles Chart)	1
Luxembourg (Radio Luxembourg)	7
Netherlands (Dutch Top 40)	9
Netherlands (Single Top 100)	13
New Zealand (Recorded Music NZ)	25
Quebec (ADISQ)	11
Spain Top 40 Radio (Promusicae)	37
Sweden (Sverigetopplistan)	29
UK Singles (Official Charts)	10
UK Airplay (Music Week)	1
US Billboard Hot 100	17
US Adult Contemporary (Billboard)	3
US Cash Box Top 100	12

=== Year-end charts ===
Year-end chart performance for "Love and Understanding"
Chart (1991)	Position
Belgium (Ultratop 50 Flanders)	94
Canada Top Singles (RPM)	93
Canada Adult Contemporary (RPM)	36
Europe (European Hot 100 Singles)	100
Europe (European Hit Radio)	6
Germany (Media Control)	82
Israel (IBA)	27
Netherlands (Dutch Top 40)	86
US Adult Contemporary (Billboard)	32

== Release history ==
Region	Date	Format(s)	Label(s)	Ref.
United States	May 21, 1991	7-inch vinyl; 12-inch vinyl; cassette	Geffen	
Australia	July 1, 1991	CD; cassette	Geffen	
United Kingdom	July 1, 1991	7-inch vinyl; CD; cassette	Geffen	
Japan	July 21, 1991	Mini-CD	Geffen	
Australia	August 26, 1991	7-inch vinyl	Geffen	
Australia	September 2, 1991	12-inch vinyl	Geffen	
