= Guy Roche =

French record producer and songwriter

- Born: Guy Tevateua Roche; 1958 (age 67–68); France
- Occupations: Record producer; songwriter; arranger; keyboardist
- Years active: 1980s–present

Guy Tevateua Roche (born 1958) is a French-born record producer, songwriter, arranger, and keyboardist. Raised in Tahiti, he relocated to the United States in 1983 and gained prominence in the 1990s and 2000s as a pop and R&B producer. He is best known for co-writing and producing Christina Aguilera's Billboard Hot 100 number-one single "What a Girl Wants" (1999) and Brandy's top-20 hit "Almost Doesn't Count" (1999), as well as producing Selena's posthumous crossover title track "Dreaming of You" (1995).

== Early life and career ==
Roche was born in France in 1958 and spent his early years in Tahiti, French Polynesia, where he played keyboards and worked with local musicians. In 1983, he moved to the United States to pursue a career in music production, beginning his studio work in Los Angeles at Criterion Studios as an audio engineer, programmer, and session keyboardist.

== Production and songwriting career ==
=== 1980s–1995: Career beginnings and major credits ===
During the late 1980s and early 1990s, Roche established himself as an arranger and producer on major pop releases, frequently collaborating with songwriter Diane Warren. He produced and arranged tracks for Cher, Celine Dion (including "If You Asked Me To" on her 1992 self-titled album), and Aaliyah. In March 1995, Roche traveled to Corpus Christi, Texas, to record vocals with Tejano singer Selena for her planned English-language crossover album. He produced the title track "Dreaming of You" and "Captive Heart". Following Selena's death later that month, Roche modified the arrangement of "Dreaming of You", adding strings and extending the instrumental fade-out prior to the album's posthumous release in July 1995.

=== 1996–2000s: Collaborations with Shelly Peiken and chart success ===
In the late 1990s, Roche formed a prolific songwriting and production partnership with lyricist Shelly Peiken. Together, they co-wrote and produced "Almost Doesn't Count" for R&B singer Brandy's second studio album Never Say Never (1998), which reached number 16 on the Billboard Hot 100.

Roche and Peiken also composed "What a Girl Needs", a song originally pitched to other pop acts before being reworked—at the suggestion of A&R executive Ron Fair—into "What a Girl Wants" for Christina Aguilera's 1999 self-titled debut album. Released as the album's second single, the song spent two weeks at number one on the Billboard Hot 100 in January 2000. Roche also produced Aguilera's singles "I Turn to You" and "Come On Over Baby (All I Want Is You)" (2000).

Throughout the 2000s, Roche continued to write and produce for international pop artists, including Kelly Clarkson, NSYNC, Laura Pausini, Mandy Moore, and Ashley Tisdale.

== Selected discography ==
Year	Artist	Song / Album	Role
1991	Cher	Love Hurts	Producer, arranger
1992	Celine Dion	"If You Asked Me To"	Producer, keyboards
1994	Aaliyah	Age Ain't Nothing but a Number	Keyboards, programming
1995	Selena	"Dreaming of You"	Producer, arranger
1998	Brandy	"Almost Doesn't Count"	Co-writer, producer
1999	Christina Aguilera	"What a Girl Wants"	Co-writer, producer
2000	Christina Aguilera	"I Turn to You"	Producer
2000	Christina Aguilera	"Come On Over Baby (All I Want Is You)"	Producer
2003	Kelly Clarkson	Thankful	Co-writer, producer
