= Killer Lords =

1985 album by the Lords of the New Church

Compilation album by the Lords of the New Church
- Released: 1985
- Recorded: 1982–1985
- Genre: Gothic rock; post-punk; new wave
- Length: 47:37
- Label: Illegal; I.R.S.
- Producer: The Lords of the New Church; Chris Tsangarides; Steven Van Zandt; Todd Rundgren

The Lords of the New Church chronology
The Method to Our Madness (1984)	Killer Lords (1985)	Live at the Spit (1988)

Alternative cover
- 1993 reissue cover

Killer Lords is a compilation album by the British-American rock band the Lords of the New Church, released in 1985 by Illegal/I.R.S. It features material from their three studio albums, two previously unreleased songs and a non-album single. The album peaked at #22 on the UK Indie Chart.

== Background ==
Killer Lords includes two previously unreleased tracks, "Lord's Prayer" and a cover of Creedence Clearwater Revival's "Hey Tonight". The songs were originally recorded for a planned single release that never materialized. "Lord's Prayer" was written by T. V. Smith of the Adverts, who offered the song to the Lords of the New Church. "He just came to us and said, "I've got a song for you blokes", explained guitarist Brian James. The two songs were produced by Steven Van Zandt in London. "l'd already known Steven for two or three years," singer Stiv Bators said in 1985. "And then the last time the Lords were in New York, he came to one of our gigs and did the encore with us." Afterwards, Van Zandt was told that the concert had been recorded for a possible live album. "We met up a couple of days later and hung out and he says 'I wanna produce the live album'," Bators said. However, the live album was subsequently abandoned by the band's manager and label boss, Miles Copeland. As a result of the changes of plan, Van Zandt selected instead to produce the planned single.

When asked what prompted the band to record their infamous and amusing version of Madonna’s "Like A Virgin", which had been released as a single in 1985, Brian James recalled: "That was Miles' idea. It got nothing to do with us at all. We saw him in the office one day and he said, "I got this great idea." Copeland then sent Bators and James to William Orbit's Guerilla Studios in London to record the song. James: "And it's like, "Right, here's the backing track, now put some guitar on it". Bators was having some difficulty with his vocal arrangement, so he turned to his friend, Michael Monroe from Hanoi Rocks, for help. "Michael came into the studio with me and we stayed there for about 12 hours getting the hang of it," recalled Bators. "And it was Michael who guided me through it. I ended up doing things I'd never even thought of, hitting notes I didn't know I could hit." The single subsequently gained the band some attention and radio airplay, taking it to #2 on the UK Indie Chart.

== Critical reception ==
Professional ratings
Review scores
Source	Rating
AllMusic	4.5/5 stars
Encyclopedia of Popular Music	3/5 stars

Gary Hill of AllMusic gave the album 4½ stars out of 5 and wrote: "Some of this material will definitely be objectionable to certain listeners, but to fans of the group, or of the early goth sound in general, this release is definitely a treat."

== Track listing ==
Adapted from the album's liner notes.

All tracks are written by Stiv Bators and Brian James, except where noted.

No.	Title	Writer(s)	Place of origin	Length
1.	"Dance with Me" (Remix)		Is Nothing Sacred?, 1983	3:25
2.	"Hey Tonight"	John Fogerty	Previously unreleased	4:55
3.	"Russian Roulette"	Tony James, Terry Chimes	The Lords of the New Church, 1982	3:47
4.	"M-Style"	Bators, James, Dave Tregunna	The Method to Our Madness, 1984	4:12
5.	"Lord's Prayer"	T. V. Smith	Previously unreleased	5:39
6.	"Live for Today"	Mogol, Shel Shapiro, Michael Julien	Is Nothing Sacred?	3:38
7.	"Method to My Madness"		The Method to Our Madness	3:16
8.	"Open Your Eyes"		The Lords of the New Church	3:27
9.	"I Never Believed"		The Method to Our Madness	3:38
10.	"Black Girl White Girl"		Is Nothing Sacred?	3:39
11.	"New Church"		The Lords of the New Church	3:30
12.	"Like a Virgin"	Billy Steinberg, Tom Kelly	Non-album single, 1985	3:47
Total length:				47:37

1993 reissue bonus tracks
No.	Title	Writer(s)	Place of origin	Length
13.	"Girls Girls Girls"		B-side to "Open Your Eyes", 1982	3:02
14.	"Opening Nightmares"		B-side to "Live for Today", 1983	3:40
15.	"Dreams & Desires"	Bators, James, Tregunna, Nick Turner	B-side to "Live for Today" 12"	4:14
16.	"I'm Not Runnin' Hard Enuff"		B-side to "Dance with Me", 1983	3:37
17.	"Fresh Flesh"		The Method to Our Madness UK version, 1984	3:34
18.	"Sorry for the Man"	Derrick Simpson, Michael Rose	B-side to "M-Style", 1984	5:53
19.	"Gun Called Justice"		B-side to "When the Blood Runs Cold (Special Remix)", 1985	3:35
Total length:				74:36

== Chart positions ==
Chart (1985)	Peak position
UK Indie Chart	22

== Personnel ==
Credits adapted from the album's liner notes.

The Lords of the New Church

- Stiv Bators – vocals
- Brian James – guitar
- Dave Tregunna – bass, vocals
- Nick Turner – drums, percussion, vocals

Technical

- The Lords of the New Church – production (1, 3, 5, 8, 11–16, 18, 19)
- Chris Tsangarides – production (4, 7, 9, 17)
- Steven Van Zandt – production (2, 5)
- Todd Rundgren – production (6)
- Lincoln Fong – production (12)
- Pete Hammond – remix (1)
- John Guarnieri – preparation, compilation for CD release
- Doug Schwartz – digital remastering
