= Lords of the New Church =

Lords of the New Church may refer to:

- The Lords of the New Church, a 1980s gothic rock band
  - The Lords of the New Church (album), 1982
- "Lords of the New Church" (song), a 1993 song by Tasmin Archer
