= Is Nothing Sacred? =

1983 album by the Lords of the New Church

Studio album by the Lords of the New Church
- Released: September 1983
- Studio: Farmyard Studios, Little Chalfont, Buckinghamshire, England; Utopia Sound Studios, Lake Hill, New York, United States
- Genre: New wave; gothic rock; post-punk
- Length: 42:45
- Label: I.R.S.
- Producer: The Lords of the New Church; Todd Rundgren

The Lords of the New Church chronology
The Lords of the New Church (1982)	Is Nothing Sacred? (1983)	The Method to Our Madness (1984)

Singles from The Lords of the New Church
- 1. "Live for Today" Released: June 1983; 2. "Dance with Me" Released: September 1983

Is Nothing Sacred? is the second studio album by the British-American rock band the Lords of the New Church, released in September 1983 by I.R.S. Records. The album's two singles, "Live for Today" and "Dance with Me", reached #91 and #85 on the UK Single Chart, respectively.

Compared to the gothic post-punk of their eponymous debut album, Is Nothing Sacred? saw the band diversifying musically, incorporating synths, horns and a greater emphasis on the bass.

== Critical reception ==
Professional ratings
Review scores
Source	Rating
AllMusic	3/5 stars
The Encyclopedia of Popular Music	3/5 stars
Sounds	4/5 stars

In a contemporary review for Sounds, Ralph Traitor gave the album 4 stars out of 5 and wrote: "This record is a sickening sell-out, a Miles Copeland sponsored nightmare, a defilement of street credibility, punk ethics and honest hard work and a rank plagiarism of James Jewel Osterburg [sic], and I can't actually find any fault with it."

In a retrospective review, AllMusic's Bill Cassel wrote: "The shadow of the Rolling Stones, the classic role model for bands who embrace rock's scuzzy, dangerous, vaguely satanic side, looms large over Lords of the New Church's second album." He felt that the influence of Mick Jagger on Stiv Bators' "lippy, sneering delivery" has never been more apparent and that Brian James emulates Keith Richards' "rhythm-oriented guitar parts." Cassel commented that if it were a Rolling Stones album, "it'd be a pretty good one, well played and entertaining throughout." He concluded that, "As a follow-up to the Lords' promising debut, Is Nothing Sacred? isn't a disaster, but it is a small step backward rather than forward."

On a more negative note, Ira Robbins of Trouser Press felt that the band ran out of material after the first song: "Following the excellent "Dance with Me," the album rolls straight down the songwriting slope, stopping off only briefly to ram through the Grass Roots' venerable "Live for Today" to no audible end." He added that, as a soundtrack for a gothic punk horror film, Is Nothing Sacred? "gets the ambience right, but that's all it does."

== Track listing ==
All tracks are written by Stiv Bators and Brian James, except where noted.

No.	Title	Writer(s)	Length
1.	"Dance with Me"		3:24
2.	"Bad Timing"		3:40
3.	"Johnny Too Bad"		3:58
4.	"Don't Worry Children"	Bators, Dave Tregunna	3:43
5.	"The Night is Calling"	Bators, Nicky Turner	4:56
6.	"Black Girl White Girl"		3:40
7.	"Goin' Downtown"		3:50
8.	"Tale of Two Cities"		4:21
9.	"World Without End"		5:26
10.	"Partners in Crime"		2:41
11.	"Live for Today"	Mogol, Shel Shapiro, Michael Julien	3:42
Total length:			42:45

2003 re-issue bonus tracks
No.	Title	Writer(s)	Length
12.	"Opening Nightmares" (B-side to "Live for Today")		3:41
13.	"Sorry for the Man" (B-side to ""M"-Style")	Derrick Simpson, Michael Rose	5:51
14.	"Lord's Prayer" (from Killer Lords)	T. V. Smith	5:36
Total length:			57:53

== Personnel ==
Credits adapted from the album's liner notes.

The Lords of the New Church

- Stiv Bators – vocals
- Brian James – guitar, backing vocals
- Dave Tregunna – bass, backing vocals
- Nicky Turner – drums, backing vocals

Additional musicians

- Matt Irving (credited as "Matt Black") – synthesizer, keyboards
- Steve "Rudi" Thompson – tenor saxophone, trumpet
- Simon Lloyd – alto saxophone, trumpet
- Todd Rundgren – synthesizer on "Live for Today"

Technical

- The Lords of the New Church – production
- Stephen W. Tayler – engineering
- Andy Scarth – additional engineering
- Todd Rundgren – production, engineering on "Live for Today"
- Chris Anderson – additional engineering on "Live for Today"
- Graham Humphreys – sleeve
- Paul Glasson – photography
- Chris Garnham – photography

=== Weekly charts ===
Weekly chart performance for Is Nothing Sacred?
Chart (1983)	Peak position
Swedish Albums (Sverigetopplistan)	42
