= The Method to Our Madness =

1984 album by the Lords of the New Church

Studio album by the Lords of the New Church
- Released: November 1984
- Studio: Miraval Studios, France; Power Plant Studios, England; Battery Studios, England; Musicworks Studio, England
- Genre: Rock; gothic rock; post-punk
- Length: 40:01
- Label: I.R.S.
- Producer: Chris Tsangarides

The Lords of the New Church chronology
Is Nothing Sacred? (1983)	The Method to Our Madness (1984)	Killer Lords (1985)

Singles from The Lords of the New Church
- 1. ""M"-Style" Released: 1984; 2. "Method to My Madness" Released: 1984; 3. "When the Blood Runs Cold (Special Remix)" Released: 1985

Alternative cover
- US album cover

The Method to Our Madness is the third studio album by the British-American rock band the Lords of the New Church, released in November 1984 by I.R.S. Records. It is also the last studio album to feature the band's original line up of Stiv Bators, Brian James, Dave Tregunna and Nick Turner. The album peaked at #158 on the US Billboard 200.

For the 1985 US release, the album was remixed and strings were added to "When Blood Runs Cold". The US version omitted "Fresh Flesh" and replaced it with "S.F. & T.", the B-side of the "Murder Style" 12" single.

== Background ==
In 1985, singer Stiv Bators spoke on the album's musical direction, saying: "When we first got together it was a nice mixture of our different personalities. We didn't know what we were supposed to sound like, so we more or less discovered ourselves. On the second album we discovered various different styles we could do, but not in a unified direction. Now we have finally settled in a direction."

Initially, the band felt very stimulated playing, writing and recording together. Their first two self-produced albums went "really, really well," according to guitarist Brian James, but Method to Our Madness was more of a struggle. Furthermore, the band's record company, I.R.S., wanted to use an outside producer, because the band was "losing its dynamic a bit," said James in 2007.

The Method to Our Madness was produced by Chris Tsangarides, who had previously worked with hard rock acts like Thin Lizzy, Gary Moore and Tygers of Pan Tang. The album features, among others; French jazz pianist Jacques Loussier, at whose Miraval Studios parts of the album was recorded; former Manfred Mann member Mike Hugg on keyboards; and the Lords' longtime session and touring keyboardist Matt Irving from Manfred Mann's Earth Band. The Lords' manager and label boss, Miles Copeland, makes a cameo appearance on "Method to My Madness" with a few spoken lines.

== Critical reception ==
Professional ratings
Review scores
Source	Rating
AllMusic	3/5 stars
Encyclopedia of Popular Music	2/5 stars
Sounds	4.5/5 stars

AllMusic's Bill Cassel wrote that The Method to Our Madness sounds more like a debut album, with the band "bursting with energy" and with a much rawer production than on their first two albums. He noted that "the aggression level stays pretty high, dipping only for a couple of ballads." Ira Robbins of Trouser Press described the album as a cross between The Stooges' Raw Power and Billy Idol's Rebel Yell. He called it "the band's least distinctive - but most popular-sounding - record." In his Encyclopedia of Popular Music, Colin Larkin felt that the album "revealed a band treading water with stifled heavy rock routines."

== Track listing ==
All tracks are written by Stiv Bators and Brian James, except where noted.

No.	Title	Writer(s)	Length
1.	"Method to My Madness"		3:15
2.	"I Never Believed"		3:38
3.	"Pretty Baby Scream"		5:00
4.	"Fresh Flesh"		3:33
5.	"When Blood Runs Cold"		3:47
6.	"Murder Style"	Bators, James, Dave Tregunna	4:12
7.	"The Seducer"		4:31
8.	"Kiss of Death"		3:37
9.	"Do What Thou Wilt"		4:11
10.	"My Kingdom Come"		4:08
Total length:			40:01

2003 re-issue bonus tracks
No.	Title	Writer(s)	Length
11.	"Dreams and Desires" (B-side to "Live for Today" 12")	Bators, James, Tregunna, Nick Turner	4:15
12.	"A Gun Called Justice" (B-side to "When the Blood Runs Cold (Special Remix)")		3:29
13.	"Good to Be Bad" (from The Texas Chainsaw Massacre 2 soundtrack)		4:45
14.	"Mind Warp" (from The Texas Chainsaw Massacre 2 soundtrack)		3:46
Total length:			56:16

US version
No.	Title	Writer(s)	Length
1.	"Method to My Madness"		3:17
2.	"I Never Believed"		3:38
3.	"Pretty Baby Scream"		5:02
4.	"S.F. & T."		3:34
5.	"When Blood Runs Cold"		3:44
6.	"Murder Style"	Bators, James, Tregunna	4:12
7.	"The Seducer"		4:12
8.	"Kiss of Death"		3:35
9.	"Do What Thou Wilt"		4:11
10.	"My Kingdom Come"		4:11
Total length:			40:12

== Chart positions ==
Chart (1985)	Peak position
US Billboard 200	158

== Personnel ==
Credits adapted from the album's liner notes.

The Lords of the New Church

- Stiv Bators – vocals
- Brian James – guitar
- Dave Tregunna – bass, vocals
- Nick Turner – drums, percussion, vocals

Additional musicians

- Matt Irving – keyboards
- Chris Tsangarides – keyboards
- Mike Hugg – keyboards
- Jacques Loussier – piano
- Vicki Brown – vocals
- Samantha Brown – vocals
- Helen Chappelle – vocals
- Tricia Ronane – vocals
- Paola Pieroni – vocals
- Tanya Landau – vocals
- Miles Copeland – voice on "Method to My Madness"
- Hein Hoven – string arrangements on US version of "When Blood Runs Cold"

Technical

- Chris Tsangarides – production
- Andy Warwick – production assistance
- Sheila Rock – photography
- Graphyk – design
