= Drop Out with The Barracudas =

Studio album by The Barracudas
- Released: February 1981
- Recorded: 1980
- Studio: Rockfield Studios, Wales
- Genre: Surf punk, power pop
- Length: 45:19
- Label: Zonophone
- Producer: John David; Kenny Laguna; Pat Moran

The Barracudas chronology
Drop Out with The Barracudas (1981)	Mean Time (1983)

Alternative cover
- Alternate cover

Professional ratings
Review scores
Source	Rating
AllMusic	4/5 stars
Trouser Press	generally favourable

Drop Out with The Barracudas is the debut studio album by English rock band The Barracudas, released in 1981 by record label Zonophone. The US version released on Voxx Records with an alternative cover features a revised track listing, replacing "Campus Tramp" with "Surfers Are Back".

== Track listing ==
Side A
No.	Title	Writer(s)	Length
1.	"I Can't Pretend"	Robin Wills	2:36
2.	"Violent Times"	Robin Wills, Jeremy Gluck	2:46
3.	"Don't Let Go"	Robin Wills	3:28
4.	"Codeine"	Traditional; arranged by Buffy Sainte-Marie	3:39
5.	"This Ain't My Time"	Robin Wills	3:05
6.	"I Saw My Death in a Dream Last Night"	Jeremy Gluck, Robin Wills	3:33
7.	"Somewhere Outside"	Jeremy Gluck, Robin Wills	3:13

Side B
No.	Title	Writer(s)	Length
1.	"Summer Fun"	Robin Wills	3:15
2.	"His Last Summer"	Jeremy Gluck, Robin Wills	3:32
3.	"Somebody"	Robin Wills	3:08
4.	"Campus Tramp"	Jeremy Gluck, Robin Wills	2:53
5.	"On the Strip"	Robin Wills	2:42
6.	"California Lament"	Robin Wills	3:41
7.	"(I Wish It Could Be) 1965 Again"	Robin Wills	3:21

1994 Voxx reissue bonus tracks
No.	Title	Writer(s)	Length
15.	"Summer Fun" (Demo Version)	Robin Wills	2:07
16.	"Chevy Babe"		2:09
17.	"You Were on My Mind" (Demo Version)	Sylvia Fricker	2:24
18.	"Violent Times" (Demo Version)		2:43
19.	"Surfer Joe" (Demo Version)	Bob Berryhill, Pat Connolly, Jim Fuller, Ron Wilson	2:22

== Personnel ==
The Barracudas

- Jeremy Gluck – vocals
- Robin Wills – guitar, vocals
- David Buckley – synthesizer, bass guitar, vocals
- Nick Turner – drums, vocals

Additional personnel

- John David – production, mixing
- Kenny Laguna – production, engineering
- Pat Moran – production, mixing
