= Open Your Eyes (The Lords of the New Church song) =

1982 song by The Lords of the New Church

Single by The Lords of the New Church

from the album The Lords of the New Church
- B-side: "Girls Girls Girls"
- Released: July 1982
- Genre: Rock; punk rock
- Length: 3:28
- Label: Illegal; I.R.S.
- Songwriter(s): Brian James; Stiv Bators
- Producer(s): The Lords of the New Church

The Lords of the New Church singles chronology
"New Church" (1982)	"Open Your Eyes" (1982)	"Russian Roulette" (1982)

Music video
- "Open Your Eyes" on YouTube

"Open Your Eyes" is a song written by Brian James and Stiv Bators of English/American rock band The Lords of the New Church, and released in July 1982 as the second single of their debut studio album The Lords of the New Church (1982).

== The Lords of the New Church original ==
The song reached number 7 on the UK Indie Chart, and became the band's only single to chart on the Canadian charts peaking at number 34, and the US Mainstream Rock at number 27.

=== Weekly charts ===
Chart (1982)	Peak position
Canada Top Singles (RPM)	34
US Mainstream Rock (Billboard)	27

== David Hasselhoff version ==
"Open Your Eyes"

Single by David Hasselhoff featuring James Williamson

from the album Open Your Eyes
- Released: September 9, 2019
- Genre: Rock
- Length: 3:19
- Label: Cleopatra
- Songwriter(s): Brian James; Stiv Bators

David Hasselhoff singles chronology
"(You Made the) Summer Go Away" (2019)	"Open Your Eyes" (2019)	"Head On" (2019)

Music video
- "Open Your Eyes" on YouTube

=== Background ===
American actor and singer David Hasselhoff's version, was released on September 9, 2019 as the lead single from Hasselhoff's fourteenth studio album Open Your Eyes (2019). American guitarist and songwriter James Williamson also featured on the song. The music video was released the same day as the song's release, and was directed by Vicente Cordero. The music video shows Hasselhoff performing in front of a wall of TV's showcasing white noise-laden images and flash the word “lies”. Hasselhoff performed the song during his 2019 tour Freedom!: The Journey Continues, who took place in October 2019 in Germany, Austria and Switzerland.
