= Like a Virgin (song) =

1984 song by Madonna

- Cover art for most twelve-inch vinyl and later CD editions, including the twelve-inch US maxi-single

Single by Madonna

from the album Like a Virgin
- B-side: "Stay"
- Released: November 6, 1984
- Recorded: April 1984
- Studio: Power Station (New York City)
- Genre: Dance-rock
- Length: 3:38
- Label: Sire; Warner Bros.
- Songwriters: Tom Kelly; Billy Steinberg
- Producer: Nile Rodgers

Madonna singles chronology
"Borderline" (1984)	"Like a Virgin" (1984)	"Material Girl" (1985)

Music video
- "Like a Virgin" on YouTube

"Like a Virgin" is a song by American singer Madonna from her second studio album of the same name (1984). Written by Billy Steinberg and Tom Kelly and produced by Nile Rodgers, it was released as the album's lead single on November 6, 1984. Steinberg conceived the lyrics after emerging from a difficult relationship and beginning a new one, drawing on the sense of renewal he experienced at the time. Musically, "Like a Virgin" is a dance-rock song built around a synth-bass groove, guitar and drums, with an arrangement drawing on Motown and the sound of Rodgers' band Chic. Lyrically, it uses virginity as a metaphor for the emotional renewal of a new relationship, while its double entendres and ambiguous wording allow for both romantic and sexual interpretations.

Initial reviews of "Like a Virgin" ranged from positive to mixed, with Madonna's vocals drawing both praise and criticism, Rodgers' production receiving praise, and some reviewers criticizing the lyrics. It became Madonna's first number-one single on the US Billboard Hot 100, where it remained for six consecutive weeks, and also topped the charts in Australia, Canada and the European Hot 100, while reaching the top ten in numerous other countries. Worldwide, it has sold more than six million copies. The accompanying music video, directed by Mary Lambert and filmed primarily in Venice, depicts Madonna alternating between a sexually assertive woman and a bride dressed in white, incorporating religious and erotic imagery as well as the recurring presence of a lion. The video has been interpreted as playing with traditional ideas of virginity, sexuality and female purity.

Madonna performed "Like a Virgin" at the inaugural 1984 MTV Video Music Awards, appearing in a wedding dress and rolling across the stage. The performance became a defining moment of her career and has since been regarded as one of the greatest and most important in the ceremony's history. She has subsequently featured the song on eight of her concert tours, the last being the Celebration Tour (2023–2024). "Like a Virgin" has been credited with challenging traditional attitudes toward female sexuality and virginity and expanding representations of women's sexual autonomy in popular music, while also provoking a conservative backlash. Widely covered, parodied and referenced in popular culture, the song helped propel Madonna to superstardom. It has since been regarded as one of the defining recordings of the 1980s and among the greatest and most important pop songs of all time.

== Background ==
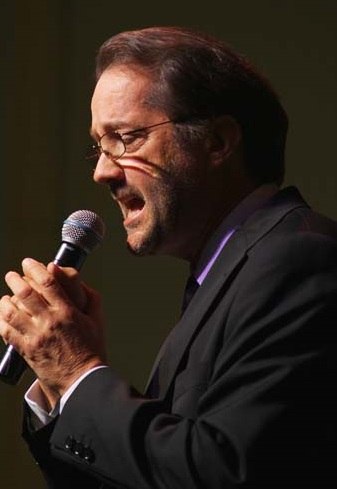
Tom Kelly (pictured in 2011), one of the composers of "Like a Virgin".

"Like a Virgin" was written by Billy Steinberg and Tom Kelly. Steinberg came up with the lyrics one day in 1983 while driving through his father's vineyards in the Coachella Valley, after ending a bad relationship and beginning a new one. He said his writing process was "stream of consciousness [...] I just get out my pen and my pad of paper and I just start writing". The expression "like a virgin" came from the sensation of feeling "shiny and new" and adapting how his new relationship was making him feel in comparison to the last one. Steinberg then brought the lyrics to Kelly without having a melody in mind. Kelly initially wanted to focused on the lyrics' earnest qualities and approached the song as a ballad, but Steinberg felt that the phrase "like a virgin" did not work in that setting.

After experimenting with different approaches, Kelly began playing a bass line inspired by the Motown music he and Steinberg admired and singing in falsetto; Steinberg immediately felt they had found the appropriate sound. Kelly, a session singer known for "this powerful high-range rock voice" was hesitant about using falsetto, but the pair ultimately recorded a "very simple but very effective" demo with him on lead vocals and Steinberg providing backing vocals. The song initially met resistance because of its title. Steinberg recalled that multiple A&R executives turned it down despite finding the song catchy, believing that its title was "bizarre" and would not suit any artist. He refused to change it, considering the phrase "the whole core" of the song. He also recalled Smokey Robinson's "Virgin Man" (1974) as an earlier example of the word being used in a song.

Although Kelly was unfamiliar with Madonna at the time, Steinberg already knew her music through his girlfriend, an aerobics instructor who frequently played "Burning Up" (1983) in her classes. The pair had yet to find a proper artist for "Like a Virgin" when Warner Bros. A&R executive Michael Ostin encountered it while listening to a selection of Kelly's demos in Los Angeles. After Steinberg and Kelly told him about the song and their difficulty finding a suitable performer, Ostin—who was due to meet Madonna the following day to discuss her forthcoming second studio album—played it for her. She was particularly drawn to its wordplay, later recalling: "How can you be like a virgin? I liked the play on words, I thought they were clever. They're so geeky, they're cool". To Steinberg's surprise, Madonna decided to record the song; he later described learning that it would also serve as the album's first single as "the happiest moment of my life, at least of my musical life".

== Recording and release ==
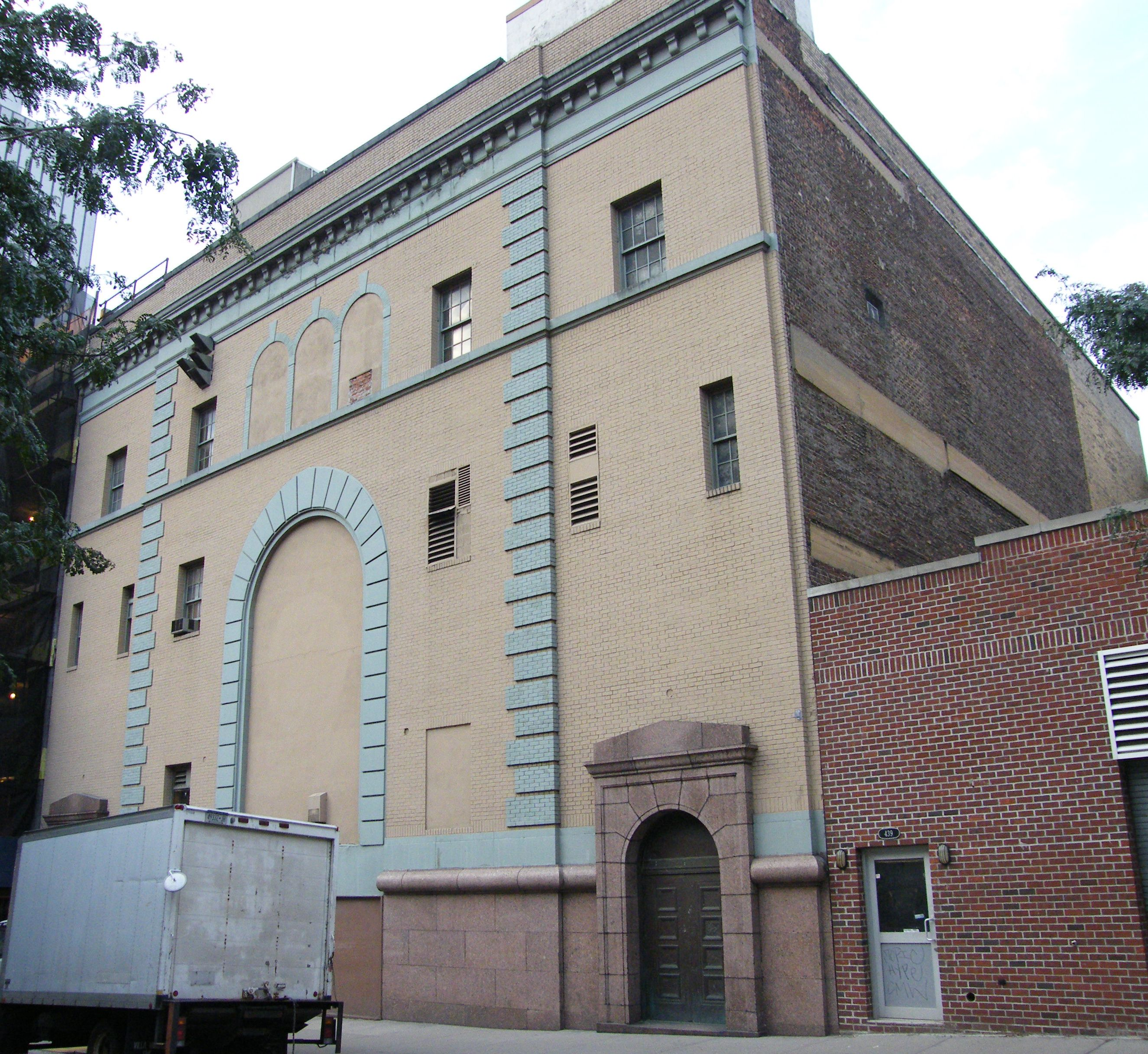
New York's Power Station studio, where "Like a Virgin" was recorded.

Producer Nile Rodgers was initially less enthusiastic about "Like a Virgin" than Madonna. He did not consider the title phrase a particularly strong hook or an "all-time catch phrase", and initially opposed recording the song. Four days later, however, Rodgers realized that the song was still stuck in his head and, after apologizing to Madonna, suggested that they record it after all. Recording took place in April 1984 at the Power Station studios in New York City. Rodgers sought a tougher, more "streetwise" sound than Madonna's previous dance-pop recordings, assembling a rhythm section with himself on guitar, his Chic bandmate Bernard Edwards on bass, and former Chic drummer Tony Thompson on drums.

Jason Corsaro, who served as recording and mixing engineer, recalled that Madonna had chosen Rodgers specifically because she wanted the "Chic kind of approach". She was closely involved in the sessions' musical direction; when Rodgers wanted to experiment with a different guitar style, Madonna instead asked him to reproduce the sound of his work with Chic. She also drew closely from Steinberg and Kelly's original demo when recording her vocals. Steinberg was particularly struck by her decision to retain Kelly's ad-libs at the end of the song, recalling:

When Madonna recorded it, even as our demo faded out, on the fade you could hear Tom saying, "When your heart beats, and you hold me, and you love me..." That was the last thing you heard. [She] must have listened to it very, very carefully because her record ends with the exact same little ad-libs that our demo did. That rarely happens that someone studies your demo so carefully that they use all that stuff. We were sort of flattered how carefully she followed our demo on that.

Corsaro persuaded Rodgers to record the sessions digitally, using a Sony 3324 24-track DASH recorder and a Sony F1 PCM adaptor for the stereo mix. Madonna recorded her lead vocals in a small wooden piano room adjoining Studio C, where Corsaro surrounded her with gobos and used an AKG C24 tube microphone with a Schoeps preamplifier and a Pultec equalizer. He recalled that Rodgers was particularly demanding about vocal pitch, but described Madonna as highly professional throughout the process. After the rhythm tracks were completed, Robert Sabino added keyboards, primarily using a Prophet-5, along with Rhodes and acoustic piano, while Rodgers also played a Synclavier. Madonna remained present throughout the recording and mixing sessions, with Corsaro recalling that "Nile was there most of the time, but she was there all of the time. She never left".

"Like a Virgin" was released as the parent album's lead single on November 6, 1984. Madonna had been eager to release the song, and recalled being "irritated" that the renewed success of "Borderline" meant she had to wait to put it out. Rodgers initially favored "Material Girl" as the lead single, although "Like a Virgin" was ultimately chosen instead; Madonna later admitted that she did not know why they settled on the latter, as she considered it "quite controversial". "Like a Virgin" was later included on Madonna's compilation albums The Immaculate Collection (1990), Celebration (2009), and Finally Enough Love: 50 Number Ones (2022). An extended remix of the song was included on the Japan-exclusive extended play (EP) Like a Virgin & Other Big Hits!

== Composition ==
=== Music ===
Musically, "Like a Virgin" has been noted a dance-rock song built around a synth-bass groove, guitar and drums. The song opens with two hooks: a three-note bass motif reworked from the Four Tops' "I Can't Help Myself (Sugar Pie Honey Bunch)" (1965), and a chordal guitar stab derived from Chuck Berry. The bass is doubled by synthesizer, creating what Spin magazine described as the foundation of the song's "disco-funk groove". Ed Masley of The Arizona Republic pointed out to similarities between the bassline and that of Michael Jackson's "Billie Jean" (1983). Rodgers' guitar enters with four sharp strums of the same chord across two measures.

"Like a Virgin"
A 22-second sample of the song, featuring Madonna's falsetto "Hey!" and title refrain over the synth-bass groove, guitar and drums.

The song remains on its opening chord for nearly 20 seconds, through the introduction and first four measures of the verse, before shifting upward and returning. Ahead of the chorus, the harmony changes again as Madonna repeats "you made me feel", building toward the title refrain. Thompson contributes brief drum fills before later choruses, while Madonna introduces a falsetto "Hey!" in the second chorus. Her youthful vocals remain at the forefront of the arrangement, supported by Rodgers' guitar and the synth bass. The song closes with a prolonged fade-out of breathless ad-libs. The commercial twelve-inch version was remixed by John "Jellybean" Benitez.

=== Lyrics ===
Lyrically, "Like a Virgin" uses virginity as a metaphor for the feeling of renewal brought about by a new relationship. The song opens with Madonna declaring that she "made it through the wilderness", describing herself as having been lost until finding a new lover. Stereogum characterized this imagery as conveying a "lovestruck euphoria", with the relationship leaving her feeling "shiny and new". In the refrain, she compares this emotional renewal to feeling "like a virgin" and "touched for the very first time".

Robert Matthew-Walker noted the song's use of double entendres, citing lines such as "Your love thawed out what was scared and cold" and "Feels so good inside when you hold me". While this new relationship does not literally make the narrator a virgin again, it recreates that feeling. Author Rikky Rooksby similarly identified the word "like" as central to the song's ambiguity, interpreting the lyrics as applicable both to someone anticipating a first sexual experience and to someone more experienced for whom a new relationship recreates those feelings. By his part, Matthew Rettenmund interpreted the song as equating virginity with the purity of romantic and sexual love. Madonna herself rejected a literal sexual interpretation, explaining that the song "isn't really about being a virgin, but of a feeling instead", with "virgin" referring to a sense of "newness".

John Fiske found several layers of meaning in the lyrics, linking religious and romantic love with sexuality and the "street wisdom" of urban survival. He interpreted words such as "wilderness", "lost", "virgin" and "touched" as moving between these different meanings. "Wilderness" evokes both biblical imagery and contemporary urban life, while "lost" carries sexual and streetwise meanings alongside religious associations. For Fiske, "virgin" can signify religious or sexual innocence, emotional renewal or naïveté, while "touched" can refer to religious blessing, physical sexuality, romantic love or loss of control. Rather than resolving these meanings, he argued that the song leaves the relationship between religion, sexuality, romance and street wisdom open to interpretation.

== Critical reception ==
Initial reviews of "Like a Virgin" ranged from positive to mixed. Brian Chin of Billboard predicted it would be the "quintessential multi-format hit" of the year-end, praising Madonna's "flawlessly phrased, witty performance" and Rodgers' "sparkling clean" production; the magazine separately called it an "out-of-the-box radio smash". Debby Miller of Rolling Stone deemed the song "terrific", while Cash Box found its hooks less interesting than those of Madonna's previous singles but said her voice was "in full force". Pete Bishop of The Pittsburgh Press found it "not very challenging" a song, and criticized Madonna's vocals as lacking character and sounding "nasal", "shrill", and "tinny". Susan Parker of The Macon Telegraph likened the lyrics to an infatuated junior-high student's love letter, though she conceded that "perhaps that's the point", while Rick Shefchik of the Jacksonville Daily News called the song "pretty hot by mainstream pop standards" but ultimately a "peep-show come-on".

Later assessments have frequently highlighted the song's blend of pop accessibility and sexual provocation. Andrew Unterberger of Spin described the song as "sexy as hell" while retaining a "core sweetness", crediting that balance for its enduring appeal, while Stephen Thomas Erlewine of The A.V. Club felt Madonna's "playful provocations" showcased both her "sexiness and wit". Author J. Randy Taraborrelli similarly characterized it as a "coy song" that presented Madonna as "excited, sexy and willing", and Thomas J. Ferraro called it "hilariously tongue-in-cheek". Stuart A. Kallen described it as "light and catchy, easy to dance to, and just plain fun". Rolling Stone, meanwhile, argued that although "virgin" is its only explicit sexual reference, Madonna's delivery over Rodgers' "funk throb" leaves the song "saturated in lust". Sebastián E. Alonso of Spanish website Jenesaispop likewise felt that her performance heightened its sexual meaning.

Critics have also praised the song's construction and production. For Billboard, Andrew Unterberger cited "Like a virgin/Touched for the very first time" as the kind of "clever, instantly unforgettable" refrain around which great pop songs are built, while Ed Power of The Daily Telegraph described Madonna and Rodgers' collaboration as an "effervescent bop for the age". Other retrospective assessments were less enthusiastic. Stewart Mason of AllMusic considered "Like a Virgin" the most lightweight of Madonna's early singles, dismissing it as "pure bubblegum fluff" and suggesting that her high-pitched delivery may even have been intended to mock the song's silliness. Tom Breihan of Stereogum praised its "huge" hook and Madonna's personality but found her voice "tinny and small". Sal Cinquemani of Slant Magazine dismissed it as a "trifle—a novelty, really", despite acknowledging its status as Madonna's first signature song. Louis Virtel of TheBacklot.com called it "kitschy and fun", but considered it the Madonna single that had "aged [the] worst" since its debut.

== Chart performance ==
On November 17, 1984, "Like a Virgin" debuted at number 48 on the Billboard Hot 100. The following week, Billboard reported that the single was added to 149 of 178 reporting radio stations. That same week, it entered the Dance Club Songs chart at number 26. On December 15, following the release of the parent album, the song topped the dance chart, becoming Madonna's second number one there after "Holiday"/"Lucky Star" in October 1983, and the sixth produced by Nile Rodgers. On December 22, "Like a Virgin" reached number one after just six weeks on the Hot 100, tying Prince's "When Doves Cry" as the fastest-rising chart-topper of 1984. Madonna became the fourth female artist to top the Hot 100 that year, following Deniece Williams, Cyndi Lauper and Tina Turner. The song was also Sire Records' second number-one single on the chart, after M's "Pop Muzik" (1979).

On January 10, 1985, the Recording Industry Association of America (RIAA) certified the single gold for shipments of one million copies in the United States. Nine days later, during its fifth consecutive week at number one, "Like a Virgin" became the longest-running chart-topper by a female artist since Irene Cara's "Flashdance... What a Feeling" (1983). It ultimately spent six consecutive weeks at number one. According to Stephen Holden of The New York Times, "Like a Virgin" was one of the fastest-selling singles in the history of Warner Bros. Records. On Billboard's 1985 year-end charts, it ranked second on the Hot 100 and third on Dance Club Songs. On August 2024, Billboard ranked "Like a Virgin" as Madonna's most successful Hot 100 entry. In Canada, "Like a Virgin" topped RPM's Top Singles chart on January 19, 1985, and ranked 35th on its 1985 year-end chart. Elsewhere in the Americas, the single reached the top three in Ecuador and Peru.

On the UK Singles Chart, "Like a Virgin" debuted at number five on November 17, 1984, and peaked at number three on January 6, 1985, behind Band Aid's "Do They Know It's Christmas?" and Wham!'s "Last Christmas". It remained at that position for two weeks and spent 18 weeks on the chart overall. It was certified gold by the British Phonographic Industry (BPI) for shipments of 500,000 copies. According to the Official Charts Company, by 2017 it had sold 832,000 copies in the country, making it Madonna's second-best-selling single there. Elsewhere in Europe, "Like a Virgin" reached the top ten in Austria, Belgium, France, Ireland, Netherlands, Norway, Switzerland and West Germany. It also reached number one on the European Hot 100 Singles. In Australia, "Like a Virgin" became Madonna's first number-one single on the Kent Music Report, while in New Zealand it peaked at number two for two weeks. In Japan, the single peaked at number 19 on the Oricon Singles Chart. According to Italian newspaper Corriere della Sera, "Like a Virgin" sold more than six million copies worldwide as of 2019.

== Music video ==
=== Background and filming ===
The music video for "Like a Virgin" was directed by Mary Lambert, who had previously worked with Madonna on "Borderline". Production was handled by Simon Fields. Warner Bros. executive Jeff Ayeroff wanted Lambert to come up with something "outrageous" for the video; she proposed filming in Venice and have Madonna singing in a gondola. According to the director, Madonna embraced the idea because of its connections to her Italian heritage and Catholic background. Lambert also drew inspiration from the Carnival of Venice, particularly its elaborate masks and the idea of "things not being what they seem". Madonna's love interest was consequently given a lion mask, which prompted Lambert to incorporate a real lion into the video; despite initial objections to the idea, Madonna supported it, and a lion was eventually brought from Rome for the shoot. The production was filmed on location in Venice and New York. Ayeroff estimated its budget at between $150,000 and $175,000, recalling that it was "way more than we'd ever spent on a video".

Lambert described the Venice shoot as "excessive", with filming taking place during the day throughout the city. For the gondola sequences, Ayeroff recalled sitting on the back of an accompanying barge and warning Madonna to duck as they passed beneath bridges. Filming with the lion presented additional difficulties: Lambert recalled that it was an untrained circus animal and that its trainer remained nearby with a rifle as a precaution. During one take, the lion approached Madonna as she leaned against a pillar, placed its head between her legs and let out a roar, scaring her. The camera continued rolling during the encounter, which ended with Madonna jumping into a nearby canal after the lion was lured away with horse meat. The singer later said that despite being frightened, she "could really relate" to the animal, adding, "I feel like in a past life I was a lion or a cat or something".

=== Synopsis and release ===
Madonna dancing aboard a gondola through the canals of Venice in the "Like a Virgin" music video

The video juxtaposes two representations of Madonna, alternating between a contemporary New Yorker and what she described as an "ancient virgin". It begins with Madonna gazing over the Hudson River near the Brooklyn Bridge, before the setting shifts to Venice. There, she wanders through the city while a lion is shown walking among the columns of the Punta della Dogana. She is subsequently seen dancing and singing aboard a gondola as it travels through the city's canals and beneath its bridges, at one point passing a group of onlooking tourists. In these sequences, Madonna wears her contemporary East Village attire, including a "Boy Toy" belt, beads, cross necklaces and star-shaped earrings, while her hair and makeup are styled to evoke a lion.

The gondola sequences alternate with scenes filmed inside Ca' Zenobio degli Armeni, where her "ancient" counterpart appears in a wedding gown, pearls and gauze, moving impatiently through the palazzo and uncovering its furniture. Her lover appears wearing a lion mask and eventually carries her to a bed. The two later leave together in a gondola, now dressed in contemporary evening attire, before the video concludes with the New York skyline. The video was added to MTV during the week of November 10, 1984. It was later included in Madonna's video compilations The Immaculate Collection (1990) and Celebration: The Video Collection (2009).

=== Reception and analysis ===
Ken Tucker of the Anchorage Times gave the video a negative review, describing it as "rather drab and ordinary" and a "disappointment". Later assessments were more positive. Ben Kelly of The Independent wrote that Madonna's ambition is "on full display" in the video, observing that as the camera alternates between her eyes and those of the lion, "it's hard to tell who looks hungrier". Ferraro described the clip as "funny, funky and bright", while Georges-Claude Guilbert highlighted its "games with carnival masks, men, lions and 'werelions'" and its allusions to eighteenth-century practices, describing the video as "extremely sexy". The clip received three nominations at the 1985 MTV Video Music Awards: Best Choreography, Best Art Direction and Best Cinematography. The video has been named one of Madonna's best by Rolling Stone, The Independent, and TheBacklot.com, and was selected by the Italian edition of Rolling Stone as one of five "incredible" music videos filmed in the country. Julien Sauvalle of Out additionally included it among her "most stylish" videos, describing its bridal ensemble as "arguably her most iconic look ever". Tom Breihan concluded that the video, "as much as the song itself, [has] wedged itself into the pop consciousness". Rolling Stone Italia pointed out its "mix of the sacred and profane", double entendres, symbolism and "light sprinkling of blasphemy" as elements that would characterize Madonna's later career. In March 2026, Madonna and actress Julia Garner recreated the gondola sequence while in Venice, posting a video of themselves lip-syncing to the song as they traveled through the canals. Four months later, Jennifer Lopez posted a similar video during a visit to the city.

Scholars have offered various interpretations of the video's Venetian, religious and sexual imagery. Tom Bromley identified the lion with Saint Mark, the patron saint and traditional symbol of Venice. Margaret Plant similarly emphasized the video's use of Venetian iconography, writing that "old sacrosanct Venice was propelled into a pop world of high-energy gyration, and endless circulation". She argued that Madonna "stretch[ed] the boundaries of tolerance" by invoking Saint Mark, whose Venice had historically imposed severe punishments for sexual transgressions including fornication and homosexuality. Plant further interpreted the masked lover carrying Madonna as a symbolic union between Saint Mark and the Virgin, with Madonna assuming the role of La Serenissima, the personification of Venice itself. Mladen Kalpic of Vreme likewise interpreted the lions as symbols of Venice, but also associated them with power, authority and uncontrolled instinct, reading their "impatient hunger" as sexual. He connected this symbolism to the masked lover carrying Madonna to the bed and to recurring close-ups of the lion licking its mouth, which he interpreted as a sexual allusion.

Other interpretations have focused on the video's contrasting representations of femininity and sexuality. Musicologist Sheila Whiteley interpreted Madonna's bridal persona as a deliberate tension between sexual innocence and experience: while the white wedding dress signifies a denial of sexual knowledge, her movements aboard the gondola undermine that image. She similarly read the lion and masked lover through sexual and fairy-tale imagery, arguing that Madonna "sheds the veneer of innocence" and metaphorically transforms her lover into the Beast after awakening his desire. NSS magazine likewise viewed Madonna as embodying opposing archetypes of the virginal "holy woman" and the sexually autonomous woman, linking this dichotomy to the video's costumes: her casual attire, bridal persona and final black dress, the latter interpreted as symbolizing the loss of virginity.

Cathy Schwichtenberg similarly argued that the alternation between Madonna's white wedding dress and black outfit evokes the virgin–whore dichotomy, while her overt sexuality complicates these roles. She interpreted Madonna's direct address to the camera as positioning the viewer as her implied lover, presenting her simultaneously as an object of desire and as a figure who exerts control through her sexuality; nonetheless, Schwichtenberg considered the imagery primarily directed toward the male gaze. More broadly, Whiteley argued that such imagery could be read either as reinforcing conventional representations of women or, through its irony and exaggeration, as destabilizing traditional constructions of sexuality and gender.

A broader spiritual dimension has also been identified in the video's erotic imagery. Andrew Greeley argued that it "celebrates a powerful erotic fantasy", drawing a parallel between the tenderness of Madonna's lover and humanity's relationship with God; he asked whether "the gentle care with which [Madonna's] lover treats her" reflected "the way God alleges that he treats us". Andrew Tomasello similarly offered a mystical reading of the video, analyzing it in the chapter "The Madonna Triptych: A Mystical Reading of Three Early Music Videos" from Music and Culture in the Middle Ages and Beyond: Liturgy, Sources, Symbolism. He regarded "Like a Virgin" as the first in a triptych alongside "La Isla Bonita" (1987) and "Like a Prayer" (1989), visuals also directed by Lambert. According to Tomasello, the three videos explore Madonna's symbolic encounters with Italian, Spanish, and African-American cultures, respectively, forming a spiritual journey that culminates in a metaphorical Promised Land.

== Live performances ==
=== 1984 MTV Video Music Awards ===
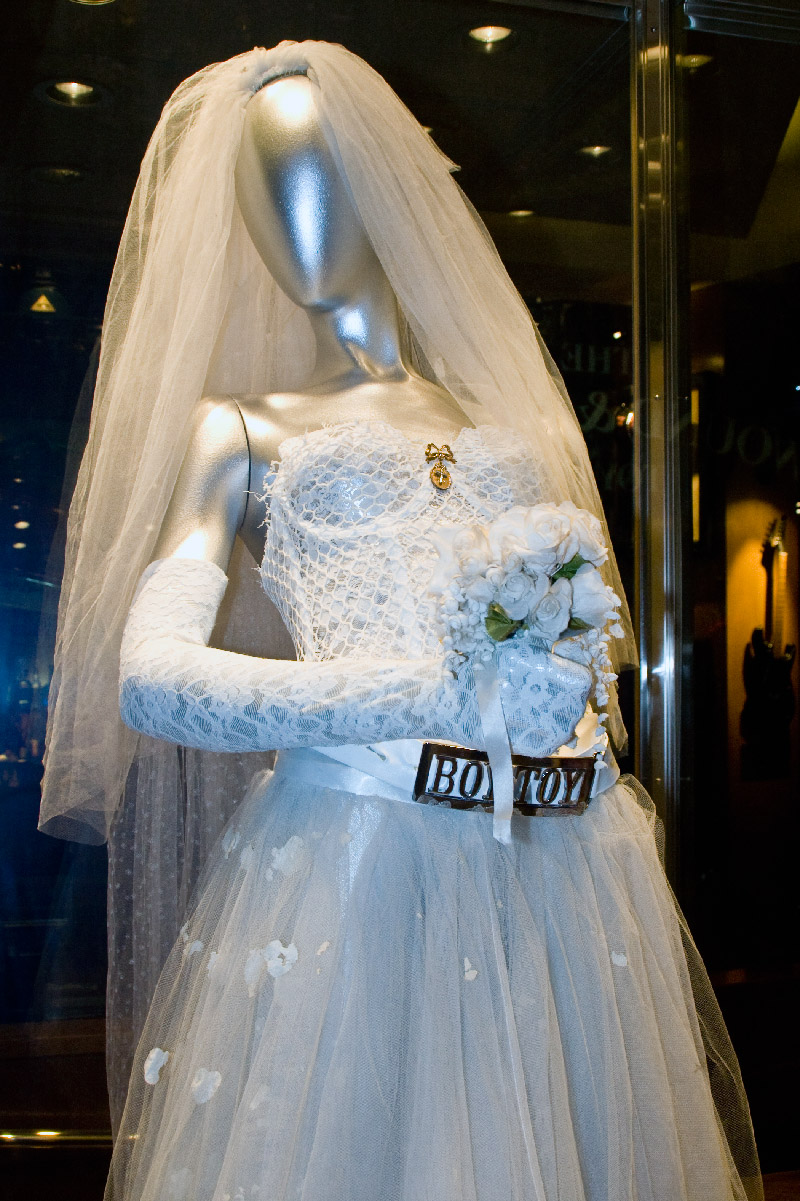
The wedding dress worn by Madonna during her performance of "Like a Virgin" at the 1984 MTV Video Music Awards; Chris Willman of Yahoo Music wrote that it "captivated a nation".

On September 14, 1984, Madonna opened the inaugural MTV Video Music Awards with a performance of "Like a Virgin. She originally wanted to perform with a live Bengal tiger, but MTV rejected the idea. Instead, she emerged atop a 17 feet (5.2 m) wedding cake wearing a white bridal ensemble with a bustier, pearls, rosaries, lace fingerless gloves and a "Boy Toy" belt buckle. As she descended from the cake, she removed her shoes and veil before loosening her hair, then crawled, rolled and writhed across the stage, exposing her slip, garters and underwear beneath the wedding dress. Madonna later recalled that the choreography had been improvised after one of her shoes slipped off during her descent from the cake. "So I thought, 'Well, I'll just pretend I meant to do this', and I dove on the floor and I rolled around", she said.

The performance initially polarized those in attendance. Publicist Liz Rosenberg recalled that several people told her Madonna's career was "over before it started", while manager Freddy DeMann similarly remembered concern backstage over the public reaction. Others, however, responded more favorably. Watching from behind the stage curtain, Maripol said she realized Madonna "had made it" as journalists rushed to identify "this girl with the white outfit rolling and crawling on the floor, with crosses in her ears". She also recalled crowds of fans waiting outside Radio City Music Hall to cheer the singer as she left the venue.

In retrospect, the performance has been widely regarded as a defining moment in Madonna's career and in the history of the MTV Video Music Awards. Ian Inglis described it as the singer's "coming-out party", arguing that it also helped establish the ceremony as a culturally significant event at a time when MTV was still seeking legitimacy. MTV News' Jessie Peterson similarly wrote that it made the Video Music Awards "the place where water-cooler moments happen". Courtney E. Smith wrote that although Cyndi Lauper won Best Female Video, Madonna "made [the ceremony] all about the 'blonde ambition'". Likewise, Tom Breihan observed that despite appearances by Rod Stewart, Huey Lewis and the News and David Bowie, "all anyone remembers is Madonna singing 'Like a Virgin' in public for the very first time".

Rolling Stone compared its cultural significance to The Beatles' appearances on The Ed Sullivan Show, and described it as "the award-show equivalent of Abraham Lincoln's Gettysburg Address", arguing that it became the standard against which subsequent VMA performances were measured. Chris Willman of Yahoo Music likewise wrote that "nothing the VMAs have done since could really compare". In 2011, MTV paid homage to the performance in a promotional teaser for that year's VMAs, featuring a cat in a wedding dress writhing to "Like a Virgin". The performance has since been ranked among the greatest in the history of the MTV Video Music Awards by Billboard and Slant Magazine, while Madonna's bridal ensemble has frequently been cited among her most iconic looks. (Note: Attributed to multiple sources, including Billboard, Bustle, Entertainment Weekly, Harper's Bazaar, InStyle, Paper, People, Slant Magazine, and Vogue.)

=== Other performances ===
On May 16, 1984, Madonna premiered "Like a Virgin" live at artist Keith Haring's birthday party at New York's Paradise Garage. Wearing a leather jacket hand-painted by Haring, she performed the song on a brass bed decorated with frilled fabric and white roses. It was later featured in several promotional television appearances throughout late 1984 and early 1985. Like a Virgin" has since appeared on eight of Madonna's concert tours: Virgin (1985), Who's That Girl (1987), Blond Ambition (1990), the Girlie Show (1993), Confessions (2006), MDNA (2012), Rebel Heart (2015—2016), and Celebration (2023—2024). On the Virgin Tour, Madonna performed the song as the encore, emerging dressed as a bride with a 20 feet (6.1 m) lace train carried by two male dancers. Recreating the MTV Video Music Awards performance, she writhed across the stage, tossed a bridal bouquet into the audience and sang a verse of "Billie Jean". Gary Graff of the Ledger-Enquirer listed "Like a Virgin" among the concert's highlights. A recording of the performance at Detroit's Cobo Arena was included in the tour's video release. Released as a music video, it received a nomination for Best Choreography at the 1986 MTV Video Music Awards.

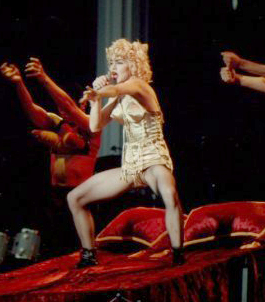
For the performance of "Like a Virgin" on the Blond Ambition World Tour (1990), Madonna simulated masturbation, prompting Toronto police to threaten her with arrest on obscenity charges unless she altered the number.

For the Who's That Girl World Tour, the song was performed as part of a medley with "Material Girl" and "Dress You Up" (1985), and interpolated "I Can't Help Myself (Sugar Pie Honey Bunch)". Madonna sang in a cracked voice that may have parodied jazz singer Mildred Bailey, changed clothes inside an onstage telephone booth, and emerged wearing what author Michelle Morgan described as one of the show's most elaborate costumes: a dress covered in toys, trinkets, and other plastic paraphernalia. At one point, she bent over to reveal a pair of lace panties emblazoned with the word "Kiss", before removing them and throwing them into the crowd. A performance from this tour was included on the video release Ciao Italia: Live from Italy (1988).

A slow, Middle Eastern-inspired "Like a Virgin" was performed on the Blond Ambition World Tour. Madonna wore a gold metallic corset with conical cups designed by Jean Paul Gaultier and sang atop a red velvet bed, flanked by two male dancers wearing cone bras strapped to their bare chests, which they stroked throughout the performance. Towards the end, the singer simulated masturbation while humping the bed. Greg Kot of the Chicago Tribune singled out the performance as "both seductive and hilarious", while Richard Harrington of The Washington Post considered it the concert's "only clear miscalculation", writing that it was "probably meant to shock, but [was] only distressing". The performance was included on the tour's LaserDisc release and in the documentary Madonna: Truth or Dare. The latter was released as a music video and received nominations for Best Female Video and Best Choreography at the 1991 MTV Video Music Awards. During the Toronto stop of the tour, police threatened to arrest Madonna on obscenity charges unless she removed the performance's masturbation sequence. She declined, stating that she was willing to be arrested to protect her freedom to "express myself as an artist"; the incident was documented in Madonna: Truth or Dare.

On the Girlie Show, "Like a Virgin" was reimagined as a 1920s Berlin cabaret number. Madonna appeared in a top hat and tails, carrying a walking cane in a look inspired by inspired by Marlene Dietrich's appearance in the 1930 film Morocco. She sang the song in an exaggerated German accent, pronouncing the title as "Like a Wirgin", and incorporated a snippet of Dietrich's "Falling in Love Again (Can't Help It)" (1930). A rendition from the Sydney concert was featured in the tour's video release.

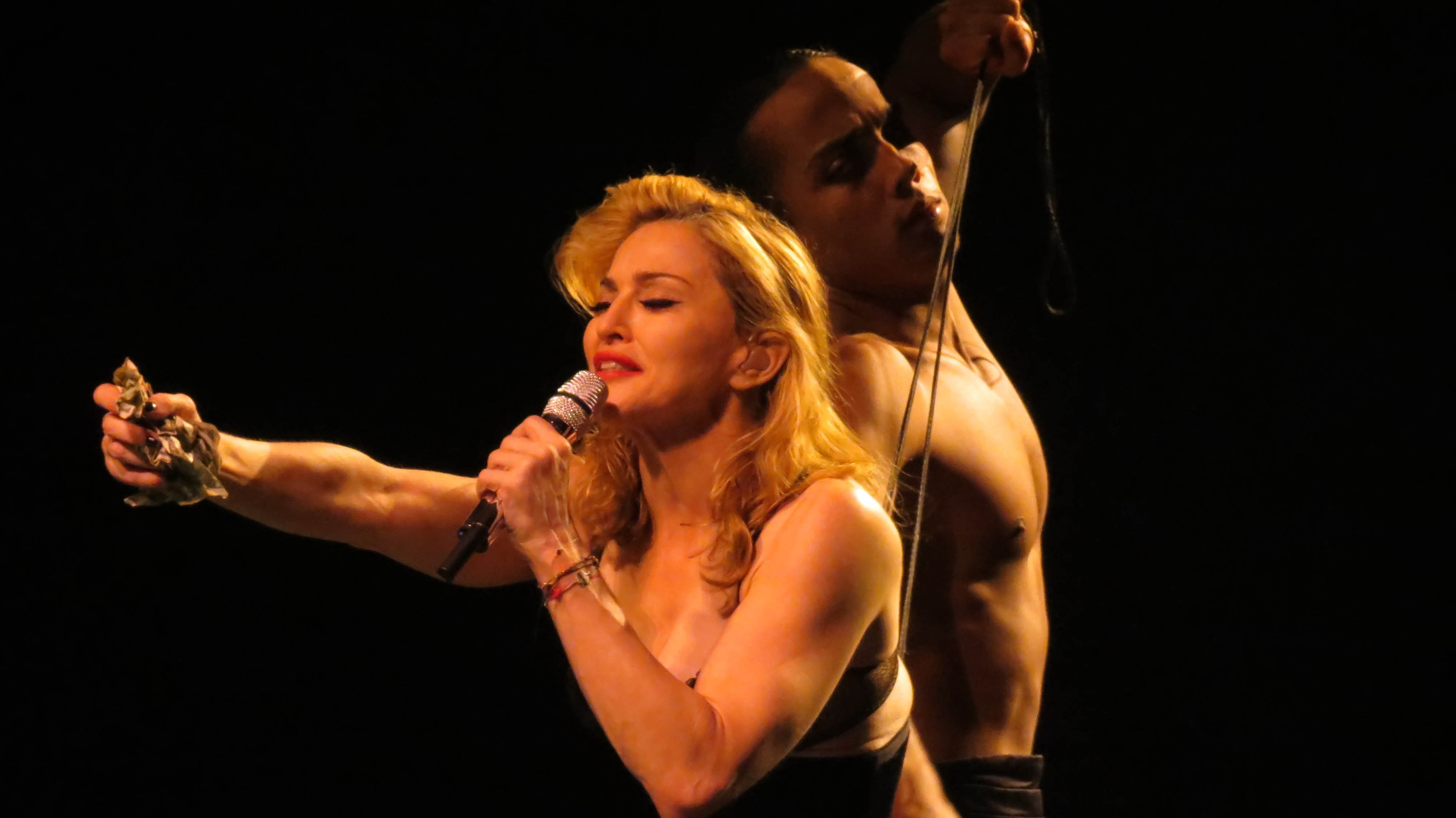
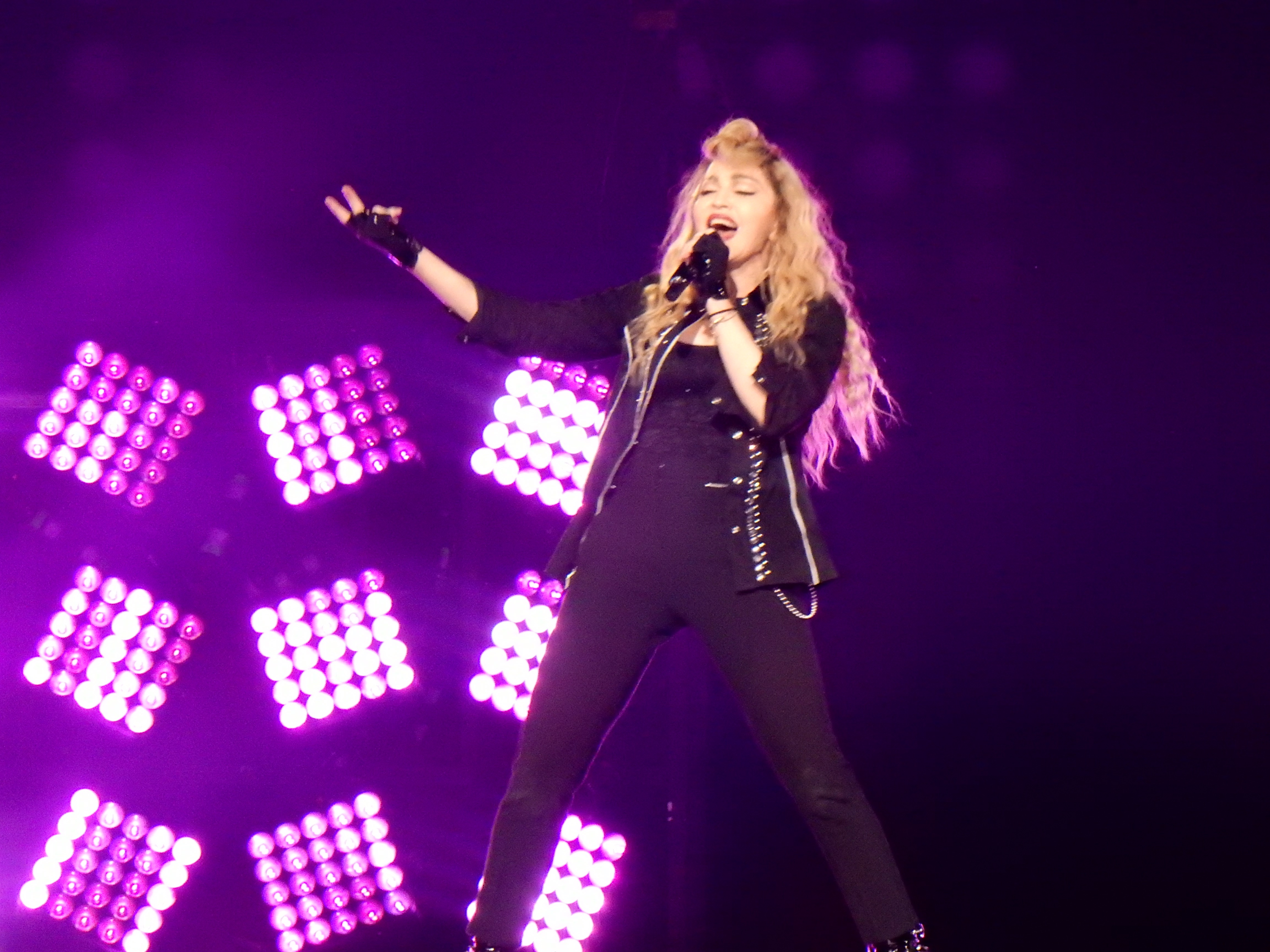
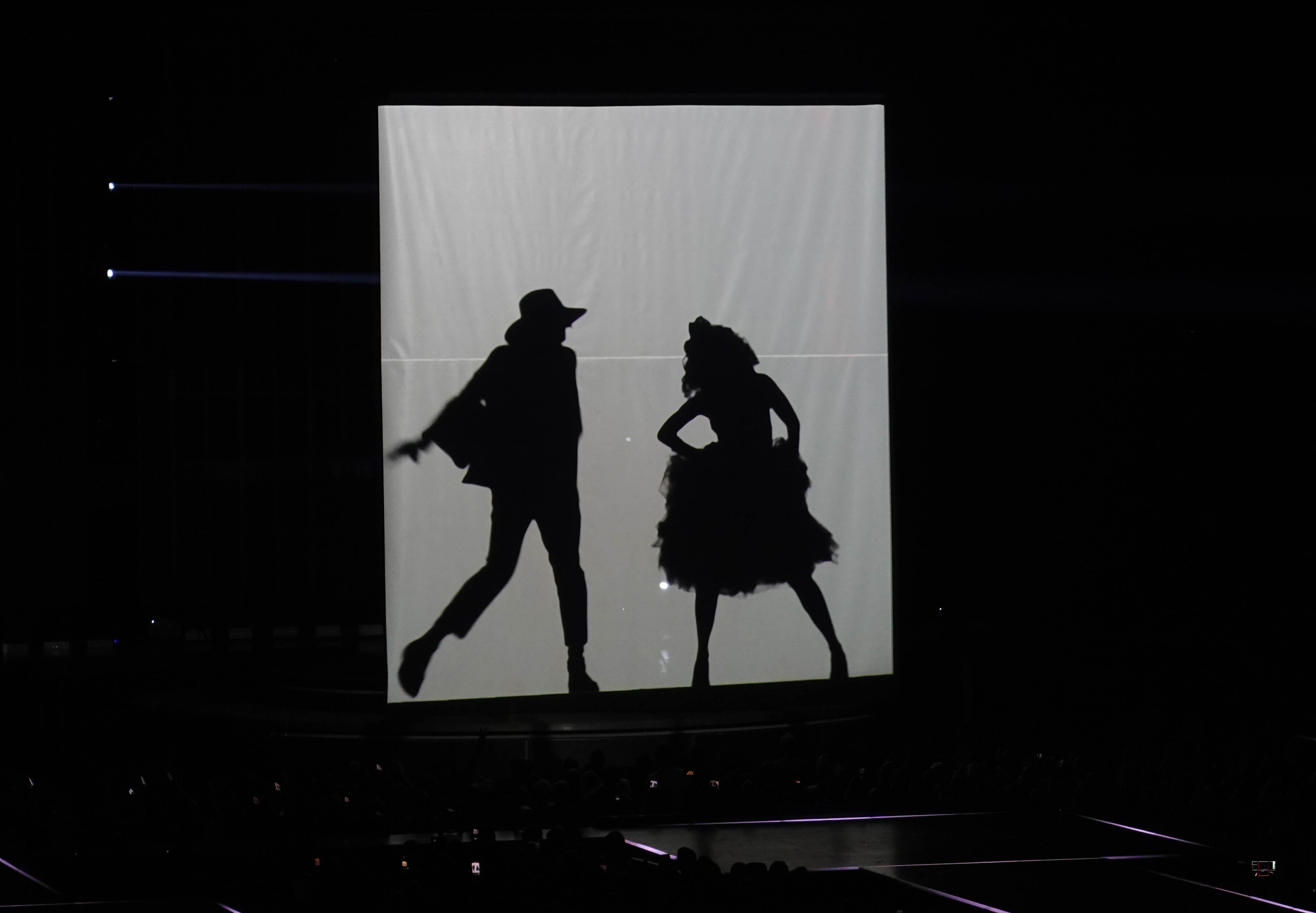
The performances of "Like a Virgin" on the MDNA (top) and Rebel Heart (center) tours, and its Celebration Tour interlude (bottom)

While promoting her ninth studio album American Life in April 2003, Madonna gave an impromptu acoustic rendition of "Like a Virgin" at New York's Tower Records. Later that year, she performed a medley of "Like a Virgin" and "Hollywood" with Britney Spears, Christina Aguilera and Missy Elliott at the MTV Video Music Awards. The performance recreated Madonna's 1984 appearance, with Spears emerging from a giant wedding cake dressed as a bride to perform "Like a Virgin", before Aguilera joined her for the refrain. Madonna then appeared in a black tuxedo, top hat and dominatrix-style boots to perform "Hollywood". The number concluded with Madonna kissing Spears and Aguilera. Sal Cinquemani described the collaboration as "nothing short of surreal", while Christopher Rosa of Glamour considered it an "important moment in our nation's history" that "spawned an entire generation of gay men". The medley was later included on Madonna's second remix album Remixed & Revisited.

The Confessions Tour featured Madonna performing "Like a Virgin" in a dominatrix-inspired equestrian outfit while riding a mechanical black saddle, as video screens displayed X-ray images of injuries she had sustained in a horse-riding accident. The number was positively received by Liz Smith for the Baltimore Sun, who named it one of the concert's best. The performance from the concerts at London's Wembley Arena was included on the tour's live album (2007). During the Rome stop of the Sticky & Sweet Tour (2008), Madonna dedicated "Like a Virgin" to Pope Benedict XVI. She also performed impromptu a cappella renditions of the song at the Vancouver, Oakland and Buenos Aires concerts; one of these performances was included on the tour's accompanying live album (2010), recorded in Buenos Aires.

For the MDNA Tour, "Like a Virgin" was reworked into a piano-driven "gothic waltz" that Timothy Finn of The Kansas City Star likened to a "tragic Leonard Cohen ballad". Dressed in lingerie, Madonna sang in a low register, accompanied by a pianist in a top hat, while a male dancer tenderly laced a corset around her waist until she could barely sing. A performance was captured for the tour's 2013 album release. A remix of "Like a Virgin" created by French producer Denis Zabee was featured on the Rebel Heart Tour. Madonna performed the song alone onstage, incorporating dance moves inspired by Michael Jackson and, at one point, opening her blouse to reveal her lingerie. Alex Needham of The Guardian wrote that she sang the song "with all the allure and aggression with which she infused it when it was first released". The performance was included on the tour's 2017 live album.

On October 7, 2021, Madonna led the audience in a brief sing-along of "Like a Virgin" during an appearance on The Tonight Show Starring Jimmy Fallon. For the Celebration Tour, "Like a Virgin" was used as an interlude in a mashup with "Billie Jean". The number featured silhouettes of Madonna and Michael Jackson dancing together. Reception was negative. Kevin Naff of the Washington Blade considered it "thirsty and superfluous", while Nick Levine of NME deemed it "misguided in light of Jackson's sullied reputation" and "the only dud visual in an otherwise stunning show".

== Cover versions and usage ==
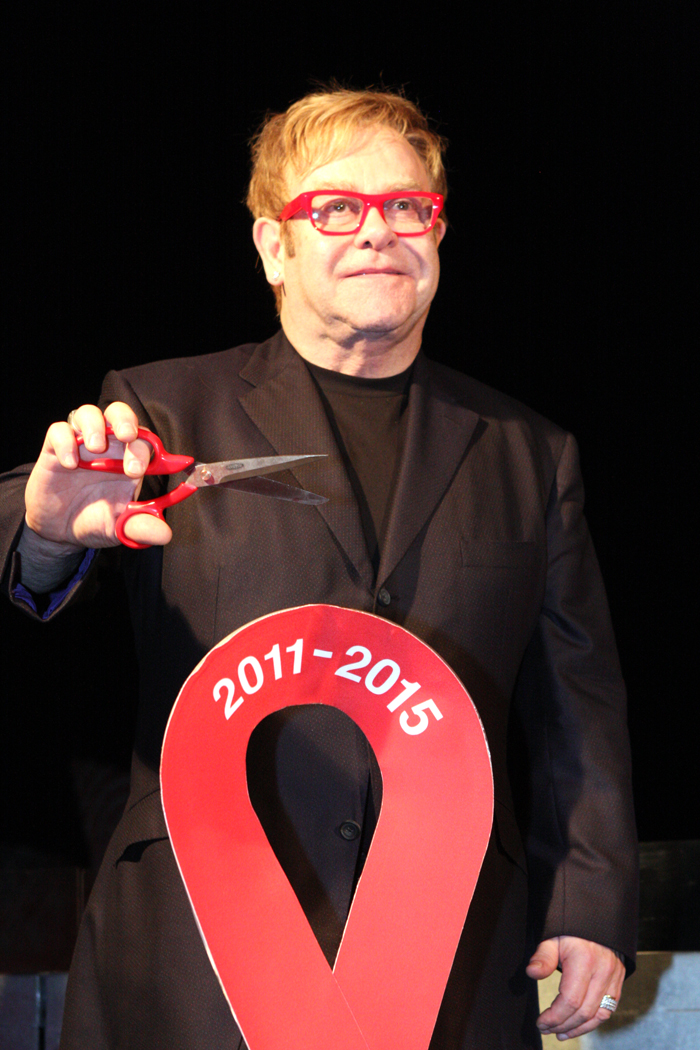
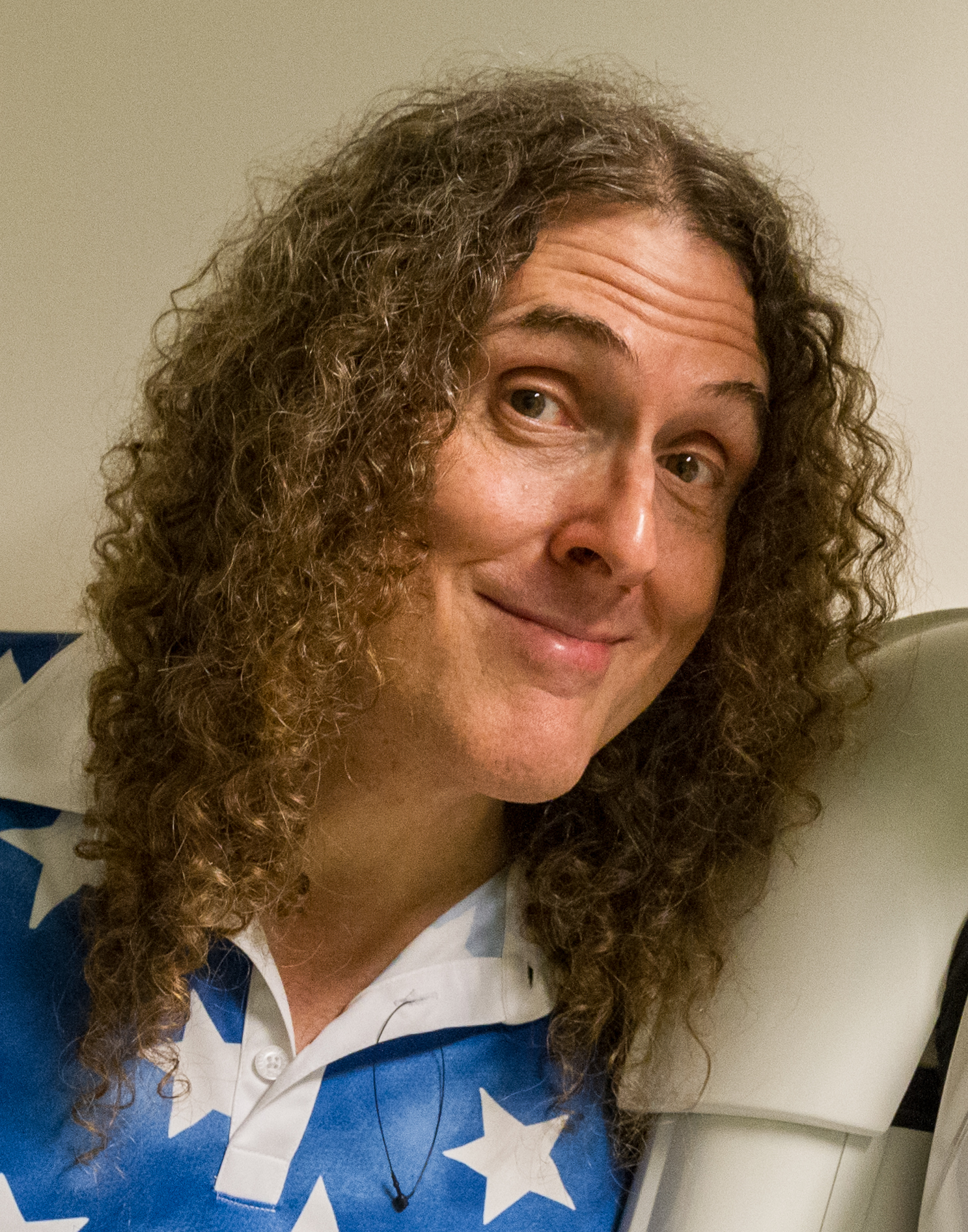
Elton John (left, pictured in 2011) performed "Like a Virgin" at the 2010 Rock for the Rainforest benefit concert, while "Weird Al" Yankovic (right, pictured in 2016) parodied the song as "Like a Surgeon" in 1985.

"Like a Virgin" has been covered and referenced in popular culture since its release. In 1985, The Lords of the New Church recorded the song for the compilation album Killer Lords; AllMusic's Gary Hill described the rendition as "funny and obnoxious". That same year, "Weird Al" Yankovic recorded "Like a Surgeon", a parody of the song, for his album Dare to Be Stupid. According to Yankovic, the idea originated when Madonna jokingly wondered aloud when he would parody "Like a Virgin" as "Like a Surgeon"; a mutual acquaintance relayed the suggestion to Yankovic through his manager, Jay Levey. Yankovic later said it was the only time a musician had successfully suggested one of his parodies. AllMusic's Eugene Chadbourne called "Like a Surgeon" "perhaps [Yankovic's] best parody ever", and the single peaked at number 47 on the Billboard Hot 100. The song remained a staple of Yankovic's live performances for decades; following the release of Madonna: Truth or Dare, he began performing it in a slowed-down arrangement similar to the Blond Ambition World Tour's rendition of "Like a Virgin".

The Peruvian singer Wendy Sulca's Spanglish rendition was released in 2012, followed by Cristina Scuccia's 2014 debut single, which Madonna publicly praised. In 2019, Mötley Crüe covered the song for the soundtrack of The Dirt. Two years later, English singer Yungblud recorded a cover of "Like a Virgin", saying he wanted to "add some Yungblud energy" to the song and praising Madonna for "every move she artistically made". During the Return of the Spice Girls Tour (2007–2008), Victoria Beckham used "Like a Virgin" for her solo segment, walking down a catwalk as images of herself appeared on screens behind her. The song was performed live by Katy Perry alongside Travis Barker and DJ AM at the 2008 MTV Video Music Awards, and by Elton John at the 2010 Rock for the Rainforest benefit concert, where he paired it with "Material Girl". In 2017, Rita Ora covered "Like a Virgin" for the BBC Radio 1's Live Lounge, incorporating elements of Travis Scott's "Goosebumps" (2016). "Like a Virgin" also inspired the name of Australian radio station Triple J's covers segment Like a Version, which began with a performance of the song by Australian band SPOD.

In 1985, producer Max Baer Jr. attempted to develop a film based on "Like a Virgin", but the project was abandoned after a legal dispute with the ABC over adaptation rights. The song is discussed in the opening scene of Quentin Tarantino's directorial debut, Reservoir Dogs (1992). Mr. Brown (Tarantino), argues that "Like a Virgin" is a "metaphor for big dicks", while Mr. Blonde (Michael Madsen) offers a contrasting interpretation. After seeing the film, Madonna gave Tarantino an autographed copy of her fifth studio album Erotica inscribed, "To Quentin, it's not about dick. It's about love". In Baz Luhrmann's Moulin Rouge! (2001), it was reworked into a comic musical number performed by Jim Broadbent. Three years later, Bridget Jones: The Edge of Reason featured a sing-along rendition performed by the title character and a group of inmates at a women's prison in Thailand. The song inspired the title of the South Korean film Like a Virgin (2006), whose transgender teenage protagonist frequently listens to it throughout the film. In the 2008 comedy The House Bunny, the cast performs a parody of the song titled "Like a Loser" during a karaoke scene. "Like a Virgin" has appeared in the television series Glee, and was referenced in Train's 2009 single "Hey, Soul Sister" with the lyric "I believe in you/Like a virgin, you're Madonna".

== Legacy ==
=== Recognition ===
Retrospective reviews have consistently ranked "Like a Virgin" among Madonna's greatest recordings. (Note: Attributed to multiple sources, including AXS, The A.V. Club, The Arizona Republic, TheBacklot.com, Billboard, Boston.com, Classic Pop, Consequence, The Daily Telegraph, The Detroit News, Entertainment Weekly, Forbes, Gay Star News, Jenesaispop, NME, Parade, PinkNews, PopMatters, Rolling Stone, USA Today. and Yahoo Voices.) Critics have also regarded the song as a turning point in her career, with both People and Parade identifying it as the recording that cemented her status as an icon. Billboard wrote that it took her from the "downtown dance diva" of her debut album to the future "Queen of Pop", while Daryl Easlea said it elevated her to the "superstar league" of Prince and Michael Jackson. Mark Bego argued that the song crowned Madonna pop's "provocateur extraordinaire", while PopMatters and Consequence said that it made her a "liberating mainstream sexual force" and transformed her into the "rebellious sexual enigma" that changed pop music "forever". NME wrote that "Like a Virgin" "maxed out [Madonna's] playful contrast of innocence and flirtiness", certifying her status as a "masterful pop icon".

The song has frequently appeared on retrospective rankings of popular music. It ranked 67th on Rolling Stone's list of the greatest songs of 1984, and was included among the best songs of the 1980s by Cosmopolitan, Elle, and Forbes. Billboard called it "one of the defining songs of the 1980s", praising its craftsmanship as a "masterclass in '80s pop songcraft" that made Madonna's "superstardom permanently undeniable". Elle called it a "definitive moment in Madonna's discography—and our memory of the '80s", while Forbes described it as a "true gem" from the decade. The staff of The Advocate called it a "generation-defining" song.

In broader rankings, it placed tenth on VH1's "100 Greatest Songs of the Past 25 Years", fourth on fourth on MTV and Rolling Stone's list of the 100 greatest pop songs since 1963, and eighth on Billboard's ranking of the 60 sexiest songs of all time. "Like a Virgin" was featured in the 2003 documentary Impact: Songs That Changed the World, which examined recordings that "have come to define our times, influenced trends and triggered change in politics and culture", and was later included in Rolling Stone's 2007 list of "40 Songs That Changed the World", published for the magazine's 40th anniversary. It was included in Bruce Pollock's Rock Song Index: The 7500 Most Important Songs for the Rock & Roll Era. More than four decades after its release, Yahoo! described "Like a Virgin" as one of the most influential pop songs ever recorded and a "chart-topping classic".

=== Impact ===
"I was surprised by how people reacted to 'Like a Virgin' because when I did that song, to me, I was singing about how something made me feel a certain way–brand-new and fresh–and everyone interpreted it as 'I don’t want to be a virgin anymore. Fuck my brains out!' That's not what I sang at all. 'Like a Virgin' was always absolutely ambiguous".

— Madonna on the public reaction to "Like a Virgin".

Critics and scholars have examined "Like a Virgin" in the context of feminism and changing representations of female sexuality in popular music. Lucy O'Brien situated its release within a period of heightened anxiety surrounding feminism, noting that the advances of the women's liberation movement during the 1960s and 70s were followed by a conservative backlash in the early 1980s under the administrations of Ronald Reagan in the United States and Margaret Thatcher in Britain. Writing for Out magazine, Nathan Smith argued that the song challenged the cultural and religious importance placed on female virginity and asserted women's sexual autonomy. He also situated it within the HIV/AIDS crisis, noting that, at a time when sex was increasingly associated with illness and "contamination", it presented women as being in control of their "erotic agendas" and able to enjoy their sexuality.

Caroline Sullivan described Madonna as a "new breed of feminist", observing that before her, no female pop singer had addressed virginity so directly or made clear that being either sexually experienced or inexperienced was acceptable. Jude Rogers of The Guardian similarly argued that female singers didn't use "the V-word" before Madonna, "unless they were singing Christmas carols". Chuck Arnold subsequently credited "Like a Virgin" with paving the way for artists such as Janet Jackson, Britney Spears, Beyoncé, Rihanna, and Ariana Grande to "unapologetically explore the sexual wilderness", concluding that "no one had to act like a virgin anymore".

"Like a Virgin" also provoked a conservative backlash. Conservative groups criticized its lyrics and accused the song of promoting sex outside marriage, while some radio stations reportedly refused to play it because of its suggestive title and Madonna's provocative image. The song also drew attention from the Parents Music Resource Center (PMRC), which campaigned for Parental Advisory labels on music. PMRC co-founder Susan Baker, wife of Treasury Secretary James Baker, reportedly became concerned after her seven-year-old daughter heard the song and asked what the word "virgin" meant. Scholar Cheryl Lynette Keyes later cited "Like a Virgin", alongside Prince's "Darling Nikki" (1984), as among the pop songs targeted by the organization. Tomasello wrote that the use of the word "virgin" in a song "seemed to violate a respected—if not revered—state in 1984, both in the physiological and Christological sense". Rettenmund similarly noted that hearing the word on mainstream radio was considered shocking at the time, particularly given Madonna's largely teenage audience.

Madonna's influence during the period also extended to fashion and youth culture. Santiago Fouz-Hernández and Freya Jarman-Ivens noted that her look around the releases of "Lucky Star" and "Like a Virgin" was immediately imitated by thousands of girls; during the Virgin Tour in 1985, audiences reportedly consisted largely of Madonna "wannabes" and look-alikes. That year, Time reported that hundreds of thousands of young fans adopted her style, wearing T-shirts labeled "Virgin", cross-shaped earrings, fluorescent rubber bracelets, lace tights, tube skirts and corsets. According to Lisa Lewis, as cited by Fouz-Hernández and Jarman-Ivens, imitating Madonna allowed many young girls to create a "space and identity of their own".

The song has retained an association with virginity and sexuality in popular culture. Scholar Karen Tongson noted its popularity at bachelorette parties, where its references to virginity contrast with the sexualized dress and behavior of participants. Tongson argued that the song allows sexually experienced women to revisit the "fantasy" and joy associated with virginity without requiring actual sexual innocence.

== Track listing and formats ==
- Seven-inch, and remastered digital single
1. "Like a Virgin" – 3:38
2. "Stay" – 4:04
- Twelve-inch single, and European CD single
1. "Like a Virgin" (Extended dance remix) – 6:04
2. "Stay" – 4:04

== Credits and personnel ==
Credits are adapted from the Like a Virgin album notes.

- Madonna – vocals
- Nile Rodgers – producer, guitars
- Tom Kelly – songwriter
- Billy Steinberg – songwriter
- Rob Sabino – synthesizers, synth bass
- Bernard Edwards – bass
- Tony Thompson – drums

== Charts ==
=== Weekly charts ===
1984―1985 weekly chart performance for "Like a Virgin"
Chart (1984―1985)	Peak position
Australia (Kent Music Report)	1
Austria (Ö3 Austria Top 40)	8
Belgium (Ultratop 50 Flanders)	2
Canada Top Singles (RPM)	1
Ecuador (UPI)	2
European Top 100 Singles (Music & Media)	1
Finland (Suomen virallinen lista)	5
France (SNEP)	8
Italy (Musica e dischi)	16
Ireland (IRMA)	4
Japan (Oricon Singles Chart)	19
Netherlands (Dutch Top 40)	4
Netherlands (Single Top 100)	4
New Zealand (Recorded Music NZ)	2
Norway (VG-lista)	8
Sweden (Sverigetopplistan)	15
Switzerland (Schweizer Hitparade)	9
UK Singles (Official Charts)	3
UK Dance Singles (Music Week)	1
US Billboard Hot 100	1
US Adult Contemporary (Billboard)	29
US Dance Club Songs (Billboard)	1
US Hot Black Singles (Billboard)	9
US Cash Box Top 100	1
US Radio & Records CHR & Pop Charts	1
West Germany (GfK)	4

2021 weekly chart performance for "Like a Virgin"
Chart (2021)	Peak position
Bolivia (Monitor Latino)	9

=== Year-end charts ===
1984 year-end chart performance for "Like a Virgin"
Chart (1984)	Position
Australia (Kent Music Report)	63
Netherlands (Single Top 100)	82
UK Singles (Official Charts)	18

1985 year-end chart performance for "Like a Virgin"
Chart (1985)	Position
Australia (Kent Music Report)	25
Belgium (Ultratop 50 Flanders)	54
Canada Top Singles (RPM)	35
European Hot 100 Singles (Music & Media)	10
New Zealand (Recorded Music NZ)	11
Netherlands (Dutch Top 40)	72
Norway (VG-lista)	20
UK Singles (Gallup)	57
US Billboard Hot 100	2
US Dance Singles Sales (Billboard)	3
US Cash Box Top 100	29
West Germany (GfK)	40

=== All-time charts ===
All-time chart performance for "Like a Virgin"
Chart (1958–2018)	Position
US Billboard Hot 100	121
US Billboard Hot 100 (Women)	38

== Certifications and sales ==
Certifications and sales for "Like a Virgin"
Region	Certification	Certified units/sales
France	—	300,000
United Kingdom (BPI)	Gold	925,000
United States (RIAA)	Gold	1,900,000
Digital
Denmark (IFPI Danmark)	Gold	45,000^{‡}
New Zealand (RMNZ)	Platinum	30,000^{‡}
Spain (Promusicae)	Gold	30,000^{‡}
United States	—	240,000
Summaries
Europe (1985 sales)	—	1,500,000
Worldwide	—	6,000,000
^{‡} Sales+streaming figures based on certification alone.

== Literary sources ==
- Anglis, Ian (2013). Performance and Popular Music: History, Place and Time. Ashgate Publishing. ISBN 978-1-4094-9354-9.
- Bego, Mark (2000). Madonna: Blonde Ambition. Cooper Square Press. ISBN 978-0-8154-1051-5.
- Bromley, Tom (2012). Wired for Sound: Now That's What I Call An Eighties Music Childhood. Simon and Schuster. ISBN 978-0-85720-323-6.
- Bronson, Fred (2003). The Billboard Book of Number 1 Hits. Billboard Books. ISBN 978-0-8230-7677-2.
- Clerk, Carol (2012). Madonnastyle. Omnibus Press. ISBN 978-2-909828-89-3.
- Detweiler, Craig; Taylor, Barry (2003). A Matrix of Meanings: Finding God in Pop Culture. Baker Publishing Group. ISBN 978-0-8010-2417-7.
- Easlea, Daryl (2012). Madonna: Blond Ambition. Backbeat Books. ISBN 978-1-61713-034-2.
- Ferraro, Thomas J. (2005). Feeling Italian: The Art of Ethnicity in America. New York University Press. ISBN 978-0-8147-2839-0.
- Fouz-Hernández, Santiago; Jarman-Ivens, Freya (2004). Madonna's Drowned Worlds. Ashgate Publishing, Ltd. ISBN 978-0-7546-3371-6.
- Gabriel, Mary (2023). Madonna: A Rebel Life. Hachette UK. ISBN 978-0-316-45644-9.
- Guilbert, Georges-Claude (2002). Madonna as Postmodern Myth. McFarland. ISBN 978-0-7864-1408-6.
- Gunn, Tim (2013). Tim Gunn's Fashion Bible: The Fascinating History of Everything in Your Closet. Simon & Schuster. ISBN 978-1-4516-4386-2.
- Kallen, Stuart A. (2012). The History of American Pop. Greenhaven Publishing. ISBN 978-1-4205-0973-1.
- Katz, Mike; Kott, Crispin (2018). Rock and Roll Explorer Guide to New York City. Globe Pequot Press. ISBN 978-1-4930-3704-9.
- Keyes, Cheryl Lynette (2004). Rap Music and Street Consciousness. University of Illinois Press. ISBN 978-0-252-07201-7.
- Lloyd, Fran (1993). Deconstructing Madonna. Batsford. ISBN 978-0-7134-7402-2.
- Matthew-Walker, Robert (1991). Madonna: The Biography. Sidgwick & Jackson. ISBN 978-0-330-31482-4.
- Morgan, Michelle (2015). Madonna. Constable & Robinson. ISBN 978-0-7624-5621-5.
- O'Brien, Lucy (2007). Madonna: Like an Icon. Bantam Press. ISBN 978-0-06-089896-0.
- Oreck, Sharon (2010). Video Slut. Macmillan. ISBN 978-1-4299-2501-3.
- Plant, Margaret (2002). Venice: Fragile City, 1797–1997. Yale University Press. ISBN 978-0-300-08386-6.
- Pollock, Bruce (2005). Rock Song Index: The 7500 Most Important Songs for the Rock & Roll Era. Routledge. ISBN 978-0-415-97073-0.
- Rettenmund, Matthew (1995). Encyclopedia Madonnica. St. Martin's Press. ISBN 978-0-312-11782-5.
- Rooksby, Rikky (2004). The Complete Guide to the Music of Madonna. Omnibus Press. ISBN 978-0-7119-9883-4.
- Sexton, Adam (1992). Desperately Seeking Madonna: In Search of the Meaning of the World's Most Famous Woman. Random Penguin. ISBN 978-0-307-48374-4.
- Smith, Courtney E. (2011). Record Collecting for Girls: Unleashing Your Inner Music Nerd, One Album at a Time. Houghton Mifflin Harcourt. ISBN 978-0-547-50223-6.
- St. Michael, Mick (2004). Madonna "Talking": Madonna in Her Own Words. Omnibus Press. ISBN 978-1-84449-418-7.
- Sullivan, Caroline (2014). Madonna: Her Story. Seven Oaks Publishing. ISBN 978-1-78177-179-2.
- Tannenbaum, Rob; Marks, Craig (2011). I Want My MTV: The Uncensored Story of the Music Video Revolution. E. P. Dutton. ISBN 978-1-101-52641-5.
- Taraborrelli, Randy J. (2001). Madonna: An Intimate Biography. Simon & Schuster. ISBN 978-0-283-07289-5.
- Whiteley, Sheila (2000). Women and Popular Music: Sexuality, Identity and Subjectivity. Routledge. ISBN 978-0-415-21189-5.
