= Danny Fury =

Swiss drummer

- Born: Basel, Switzerland
- Occupation: Drummer
- Years active: 1980s–present

Danny Fury (born in Basel) is a Swiss drummer. He has been a member of Rogue Male, The Lords of the New Church, Kill City Dragons, Vain, The Dogs D'Amour and Sham 69.

After playing in several bands and touring Switzerland, France and Germany, as well as working as a session drummer at Musicland Studios in Munich. Fury moved to London in 1984. as of 2011 Fury formed and became the vocalist of the Tango Pirates. now also known as "Danny Fury's Tango Pirates".

== Discography ==
With Rogue Male

- Animal Man (1986)

With Lords of the New Church

- Second Coming (1989)
- Making Time (1989)
- The Lords Prayers (2002)
- The Gospel Truth (2012)

With Kill City Dragons

- Let 'em eat Cake (1990)
- Kill City Dragons (1990)

With Vain

- Move on it (1994)

With Wild at Heart

- Chasing The Dragon (2007)

With Sham 69

- Set List, The Anthology (2013)

With The DeRellas

- Slam Bam (2014)

With Dirty Strangers...with Brian James

- T'Troublemaker / S.B.C.L. (2017)

With (Danny Fury's) Tango Pirates

- Back on Track (2012)
- In Transition (2014)
- Danger! Children at Play (2015)
