= The Lords of the New Church (album) =

1982 album by the Lords of the New Church

Studio album by the Lords of the New Church
- Released: July 1982
- Studios: Farmyard Studios, Little Chalfont, Buckinghamshire, England
- Genres: New wave; gothic rock
- Length: 33:48
- Labels: Illegal; I.R.S.
- Producer: The Lords of the New Church

The Lords of the New Church chronology
The Lords of the New Church (1982)	Is Nothing Sacred? (1983)

Singles from The Lords of the New Church
- 1. "New Church" Released: April 1982; 2. "Open Your Eyes" Released: July 1982; 3. "Russian Roulette" Released: November 1982

Alternative cover
- 1982 US album cover

The Lords of the New Church is the debut studio album by the British-American rock band the Lords of the New Church. It was released in 1982 by Illegal Records in the United Kingdom and by I.R.S. Records in the United States.

The album was well-received at the time and peaked at #3 on the UK Indie Chart with the single "Open Your Eyes" reaching #7 on the UK Indie Chart, #34 on the Canadian charts and #27 on the US Rock chart. Two other singles also made the UK Indie Chart: "New Church" (#34) and "Russian Roulette" (#12).

== Background ==
The Lords of the New Church were formed in 1981 by singer Stiv Bators and guitarist Brian James, who had been founding members of Cleveland's Dead Boys and London's the Damned, respectively. The two experimented for a time with different rhythm sections, before bassist Dave Tregunna (ex-Sham 69) and drummer Nicky Turner (ex-the Barracudas) joined the fold. Their first recordings as a band was the debut single "New Church" and its B-side "Livin' on Livin'", after which they recorded the rest of the album. It was recorded at Farmyard Studios in England and produced by the band themselves. Stiv Bators said in 1986: "The Lords was a definite sound that I had in my head ... the jungle rhythms and sort of an eerie voodoo guitar. Brian had almost the same sound in his head."

"Russian Roulette", which took lyrical inspiration from the film Apocalypse Now, had been introduced to the Lords during their first rehearsals with the song's writers, bassist Tony James and drummer Terry Chimes. Brian James: "When Stiv and I started forming the Lords, we were looking for bass and drum set up. First of all we started playing with Tony James and Terry Chimes and we rehearsed a few times with that set up, just kind of messing about, feeling it out." This constellation lasted three months, according to Tony James, but "Russian Roulette" stayed and made the album. Tony James: "I actually wrote what is considered to be one of their best songs ... . If you take a look at the song credit on the label you’ll see it’s credited to James/Chimes although I wrote it all." For Guardians of the Galaxy Vol. 3, director James Gunn had attempted to use the song but he was unable to due to legal confusion over who owned it.

The Lords of the New Church was released through the labels Illegal (UK) and I.R.S. (US), both of which were co-founded by Miles Copeland, who had also taken on the band's management.

Original artist for the album cover is English artist Graham Humphreys.

== Musical style and themes ==
Musically, the album is a mix of punk, glam, garage rock and goth, described by New Noise Magazine as a "seedy concoction of spidery guitars, sleazy bass lines, jungle drums and gothic keyboards."

The album saw the band expressing a "core message of personal freedom", as well as flirting with apocalyptic and religious imagery fueling criticisms about the band's apparent blasphemy. Nicky Turner said in 2018: "I think we wanted to make a mark. We wanted to be political, in a sense, which you can hear in the lyrics of songs like 'New Church' and 'Holy War', you know, to create a stir."

"Li'l Boys Play with Dolls" is a tribute to the New York Dolls using lyrics and song titles from their first two albums.

== Critical reception ==
Professional ratings
Review scores
Source	Rating
AllMusic	4.5/5 stars
Blurt	4/5 stars
Robert Christgau	C
Encyclopedia of Popular Music	2/5 stars

Critic Robert Christgau gave the album a C grade, describing the music as "new-wave Black Sabbath, complete with technoprofessional arena echo."

In a retrospective review, AllMusic's Bill Cassel gave the album a 4½-star rating, writing that while he couldn't call the album entirely successful, "for every high point like "Open Your Eyes" or "Russian Roulette" there's a clunker like "Portobello" or "Eat Your Heart Out", he couldn't fault their effort. He concluded that the album "is very much an artifact of the Reagan era and somewhat dated in its approach, but Bators' core message of personal freedom, and the fervor and sincerity with which he delivered it, have retained their resonance across the years."

Michael Toland of Blurt magazine gave the album 4 stars out of 5, describing it as a "mélange of different sounds" with every song wrapped in "catchy licks, memorable choruses and a B-movie atmosphere." Toland felt that the album's "shiny but aggressive blend of garage rock, gothic pop and glam punk" should sound dated, but that the band’s "distinctive personality and strong songwriting" distinguishes them from "their more timebound peers." He concluded that The Lords of the New Church "still holds up as a classic, timeless rock & roll record."

== Track listing ==
All tracks are written by Stiv Bators and Brian James, except where noted.

No.	Title	Writer(s)	Length
1.	"New Church"		3:33
2.	"Russian Roulette"	Tony James, Terry Chimes	3:47
3.	"Question of Temperature"	Mike Appel, Ed Schnug, Don Henny	2:56
4.	"Eat Your Heart Out"		2:36
5.	"Portobello"		2:40
6.	"Open Your Eyes"		3:28
7.	"Livin' on Livin'"		3:21
8.	"Li'l Boys Play with Dolls"		3:42
9.	"Apocalypso"		3:10
10.	"Holy War"		4:23
Total length:			33:48

1987 re-issue bonus track
No.	Title	Length
11.	"Dance with Me" (1985 remix)	3:27
Total length:		37:15

2003 re-issue bonus tracks
No.	Title	Length
11.	"The Young Don't Cry" (B-side to "Russian Roulette")	3:44
12.	"Girls Girls Girls" (B-side to "Open Your Eyes")	3:03
13.	"I'm Not Running Hard Enough" (B-side to "Dance with Me")	3:38
Total length:		44:10

2018 re-issue bonus tracks
No.	Title	Length
11.	"Girls Girls Girls" (B-side to "Open Your Eyes")	3:03
12.	"Young Don't Cry" (B-side to "Russian Roulette")	3:44
13.	"Open Your Eyes" (Single version)	3:16
Total length:		44:07

2018 re-issue bonus disc (Live from My Father's Place, October 1982)
No.	Title	Writer(s)	Length
1.	"New Church"		4:04
2.	"Question of Temperature"	Appel, Schnug, Henny	3:03
3.	"Girls Girls Girls"		3:02
4.	"Livin' on Livin'"		3:16
5.	"Eat Your Heart Out"		3:02
6.	"Russian Roulette"	T. James, Chimes	3:33
7.	"Fortune Teller"	Naomi Neville	2:57
8.	"Open Your Eyes"		3:37
9.	"Li'l Boys Play with Dolls"		3:26
10.	"Holy War"		6:08
11.	"Portobello"		2:32
12.	"Apocalypso"		3:02
13.	"New Church"		4:40
Total length:			46:29

== Chart positions ==
Chart (1982)	Peak position
Canada Top Albums/CDs (RPM)	93
Swedish Albums (Sverigetopplistan)	39
UK Indie Chart	3

== Personnel ==
Credits adapted from the album's liner notes.

The Lords of the New Church

- Stiv Bators – vocals
- Brian James – guitar, backing vocals
- Dave Tregunna – bass, backing vocals
- Nicky Turner – drums, backing vocals

Additional musicians

- Matt Irving – synthesizer
- Steve "Rudi" Thompson – horns
- Simon Lloyd – horns
