= Mean Time =

Studio album by The Barracudas
- Released: February 1983
- Recorded: October–November 1982
- Studio: Startling Studios, Ascot, Berkshire
- Label: Closer
- Producer: Peter Gage

The Barracudas chronology
Drop Out with The Barracudas (1981)	Mean Time (1983)

Mean Time is the second studio album by English rock band The Barracudas, released in 1983 by record label Closer. The incorporation of Chris Wilson from The Flamin' Groovies gave this new formation a paramount weight in the eighties' garage rock bands' scene.

== Track listing ==
All tracks composed by Jeremy Gluck and Robin Wills; except where noted.

1. "Grammar of Misery"
2. "Bad News" (Robin Wills)
3. "I Ain't No Miracle Worker" (Nancy Mantz, Annette Tucker)
4. "Be My Friend Again" (Jeremy Gluck, Chris Wilson)
5. "Shades of Today"
6. "Dead Skin"
7. "Middle Class Blues" (Bob Ronco, Chris Wilson)
8. "You've Come a Long Way" (Robin Wills)
9. "Ballad of a Liar"
10. "When I'm Gone" (Robin Wills)
11. "Eleventh Hour"
12. "Hear Me Calling" (Robin Wills)

== Personnel ==
The Barracudas

- Jeremy Gluck - vocals
- Chris Wilson, Robin Wills - guitar, vocals
- Jim Dickson - bass, vocals
- Terry Smith - drums, percussion
- Peter Gage - keyboards

Technical

- Mike O'Donnell - engineer

== Content ==
Trouser Press described the album's sound as a "'60sish blend of punky pop, vintage rock'n'roll, mock Merseybeat, snarly mild psychedelia and Byrdsy 12-string folk-rock."

== Reception ==
Professional ratings
Review scores
Source	Rating
AllMusic	4.5/5 stars
Trouser Press	favourable

AllMusic called it "the Barracudas' masterpiece", whilst Trouser Press classed it as "wonderful".
