= Rogue Male (band) =

British heavy metal band

- Origin: London, England
- Genre: Biker metal
- Labels: Music For Nations, Rm2k

Rogue Male are a British heavy metal band, formed in 1984.

Rogue Male was the brainchild of Northern Ireland-born singer and guitarist Jim Lyttle, who had previously been in the Northern Irish punk rock band Pretty Boy Floyd and The Gems. Moving to London in the late 1970s, he decided to put together a band that would mix punk rock styles and aggression, with the more heavy metal sounds of the NWOBHM bands of the time. The band signed to the UK heavy metal label Music for Nations and subsequently Elektra in the US., Shortly afterwards, the band were invited to appear on the E.C.T. (Extra Celestial Transmission) Heavy Metal music programme on England's Channel 4 where they performed two songs live on 19 April 1985.

The first Rogue Male album, First Visit, was written and arranged by Jim Lyttle, recorded by Jim Lyttle on guitar and vocals, John Fraser-Binnie on guitar, Phil Clark on bass, later replaced by Kevin Collier Bass, and Steve Kingsley on drums., Kingsley was later replaced by Danny Fury., The album was produced by Steve James. Rogue Male toured the UK, Europe and the US in support of it. Kerrang! magazine in the UK gave the band several features, and a front cover article, they also got featured in several main rock mags throughout Europe and Japan and were awarded Top International New Artist by number one French magazine Enfer. "All Over You" was released as a 12-inch single. Their second album also written and arranged by Lyttle. Animal Man, was released a year later. Rogue Male subsequently dropped their record companies and started legal proceedings for infringement and conflict of interest against them and their manager Martin Hooker (MFN). The 1980s incarnation of the band played their final show in late 1987. After a six year long protracted legal battle, Lyttle won the copyright to all Rogue Male material, including the trading name Rogue Male.

Both the original albums were re-released on the Polish label Metal Mind Records in 2007. In an interview in the March 2009 edition of Classic Rock Magazine, Lyttle stated that he had recently written, arranged, recorded and produced a new Rogue Male album. Released in 2010, this album guested Bernie Tormé on guitar on some tracks, with John McCoy on bass and Robin Guy on drums providing the rhythm section and was called Nail It. A new track, "Cold Blooded Man", appeared on the CD which accompanied the magazine. Original guitarist John Fraser Binnie subsequently rejoined the band and a new DVD entitled Liar was recorded and released. The album Hardcase was released in 2023 on their own RM2K music label featuring all the original members, including Danny Fury and also session drummer Greg Brown (drums), recorded at Alvic Studio in London and Rockfield Studio in Wales. The first four tracks recorded at Alvic were produced by Steve James, and the rest at Rockfield were produced by Jim Lyttle.

== Discography ==
=== Studio albums ===
- First Visit (1985) Music for Nations MFN40 /Elektra Records 96 04231
- Animal Man (1986) Music for Nations MFN68 / Elektra Records
- First Visit (2007) Re-release on Metal Mind Productions
- Animal Man (2007) Re-release on Metal Mind Productions
- Nail It (2010) RM2K Music RMCD01
- Hardcase(2023) RM2K Music RMCD04

=== Singles ===
- "All Over You" (1985) - 12" Music for Nations 12KUT114 / Elektra Records
  - "All Over You (full version)", "All Over You (edit)", "The Real Me"
- "Belfast" (1986) - 12" Music for Nations 12KUT122
  - "Belfast", "Rough Tough (Pretty Too)", "Take No Shit"

=== Compilation albums ===
- "Crazy Motorcycle" on Welcome to the Metal Zone (1985) Music for Nations MFN49
- "Belfast" on MFN: The Singles Album (1986) Music for Nations MFN71
- "The Passing" on Nightmare on Carnaby St (1988) Music for Nations MFN83
