= The Barracudas =

English surf rock band

- Origin: London, England
- Genres: Garage rock revival; surf rock; jangle pop; pop punk
- Years active: 1979–1984, 1989, 2005–present
- Labels: EMI, Closer, Flicknife, NDN
- Members: Jeremy Gluck; Robin Wills; Chris Wilson; Rob Coyne; Yan Quellien
- Past members: Adam Phillips; Starkie Phillps; Nick Turner; David Buckley; Jim Dickson; Terry Smith; Steve Robinson; Mark Sheppard

The Barracudas are an English surf rock band formed in late 1978. The band's original line-up consisted of Jeremy Gluck (vocals), Robin Wills (guitar and vocals), Starkie Phillips (bass and vocals) and Adam Phillips (drums). Before the band recorded its first single, Starkie and Adam Phillips left the band.

The band is notable for their 1980 hit single "Summer Fun", which started with an excerpt from a 1960s spoof advertisement for the Plymouth Barracuda campaign. The song included dialogue where announcers had difficulty pronouncing the word barracuda. The single reached number 37 on the UK Singles Chart.

The band officially lasted until 1981 with a final performance in Madrid. There have been a few occasional performances since.

== Early history ==
The beginnings of the band can be traced back to the year of 1978 when Canadian-born Gluck met Wills at a Dead Fingers Talk concert. Here the pair bonded over a shared passion for "60's garage and psychedelic music ". They started off calling themselves the "R.A.F.", but eventually settled on the name of The Barracudas. The name was inspired by a song they both liked by The Standells.

== Recent activity ==
Initially perceived as a novelty surf act due to their first album, subsequent recordings showed them to be a fierce garage rock and roll band in the mould of the 13th Floor Elevators and The Seeds. The band split in 1984, but reformed in 1989 to record "Wait For Everything," and then again in 2003. In 2005 they recorded the self-titled album on NDN. Throughout their career, their live performances have been energetic and frenetic.

After the first attempt at their second album, the group lost drummer Nick Turner to the group Lords of the New Church. Afterwards, Jeremy Gluck and guitarist Robin Wills assembled a new The Barracudas group, that went on to record their second album Mean Time.

The Barracudas disbanded in 1984, after making their third and final album Endeavour to Persevere. However, in 2005, there became a growing interest regarding the reissue of their back catalogue. This resulted in Gluck and Wills reconnecting, and the two of them began composing again.

In 2014, the band reissued their Meantime album as a limited edition picture disc, under the reborn "Closer French" label.

== Discography ==
=== 7" Singles ===
- "I Want My Woody Back" / "Subway Surfin" Cells CELLOUT 1 (February 1979)
- "Summer Fun" / "Chevy Baby" Zonophone Z5 (July 1980)
- "His Last Summer" / "Barracuda Waver" / "Surfers Are Back" Zonophone Z8 (September 1980)
- "(I Wish It Could Be) 1965 Again" / "Rendezvous" Zonophone Z11 (November 1980)
- "I Can't Pretend" / "K.G.B. (Made a Man Out of Me)" Zonophone Z17 (January 1981)
- "Inside Mind" / "Hour Of Degradation" Flicknife FLS027 (February 1982)
- "I Can't Pretend EP" Voxx/Bomp EP3303 (June 1982)
- "The Way We've Changed" / "Laughin At You" Closer CL0006 (March 1984)
- "Stolen Heart" / "See Her Eyes Again" Closer CL7-15 (September 1984)
- "Live EP" Record Runner RRR-002 (1984)
- "Very Last Day" / "There's A World Out There" Bucketfull of Brains #7 (June 1985) Free with magazine
- "Hear Me" / "She Knows" Dog Meat Records Dog022 (1989)
- "Next Time Around" / "Takes What He Wants" Sympathy for The Record Industry SFTRI49 (July 1990)
- "I Thought You Sounded That Way Yesterday" Shake SAL202 (January 1991)
- "Don't Ever Say It Can't Be So" / "Not That Kind" Munster 7183 (2003)
- "What You Want is What You Get" / "Somebody '05" NDN NDN040 (2005)
- "Two Headed Dog" / "Teenage Head" Pop The Balloon Bang26 (2010)
- "God Bless The 45" / "Festival Pop" / "East European Girls" Purepop PP 1965 (2013)

=== 12" singles and EPs ===
- "House Of Kicks" Flicknife FLEP103 (May 1983)
- "Live In Madrid" El Piso K9EP13 (July 1984)
- "Stolen Heart" Closer CL12-15 (September 1984)
- "Grammar Of Misery" Shakin' Street YEAHUP015 (October 1990)

=== Albums ===
- Drop Out with The Barracudas LP Zonophone ZONO103 (February 1981)/ Voxx 200.009 (1982)
- Drop Out with The Barracudas CD EMI Gold 8757582 (May 2005) remaster with bonus tracks/ Voxx VCD2009 (June 1994) different bonus tracks
- Mean Time LP Closer CL001 (February 1983)French/CD Mau Mau (June 1995) inc bonus tracks/CD Airmail (November 2006) remaster with more bonus tracks
- Live '83 LP Coyote COR021 (October 1983)
- Endeavour To Persevere LP Closer CL009 (April 1984)/CD Mau Mau (June 1995) inc bonus tracks/CD Airmail (November 2006) remaster with more bonus tracks
- The Big Gap LP Coyote COR022 (July 1984)
- Los Angeles and Vicinity Vol 1 (Live in Le Havre 1982/09/18) LP 66 Records MP1002 (1985) Bootleg
- (I Wish It Could Be) 1965 Again LP GMG 75003 (January 1985)
- The World's A Burn LP Trust Minitrust1 (April 1985)
- Live In Madrid LP Impossible A4-25 (July 1985)
- Surf and Destroy LP/CD GMG 270 (June 1987)
- The Garbage Dump Tapes LP/CD Shakin' Street YEAH HUP 006 (January 1990)
- The Complete EMI Recordings CD EMI C2-95 185 (January 1991)
- Wait For Everything LP/CD Shake 203 (20 January 1992)
- Two Sides of a Coin 1979-84 CD Flicknife/Anagram CDM M GRAM 62 (March 1993)
- Through The Mysts Of Time: Rarities 1979-81 CD Voxx VCD2072 (October 1999)
- This Ain't My Time: Anthology '79-'90 CD Castle (2001)
- The Barracudas LP/CD NDN NDN41 (October 2005)
- "Nothing Ever Happens In The Suburbs, Baby!" 10" Mini-LP NDN45 (2006)
- Mean Time LP Closer CL001 Limited Edition PIC-DISC (2014)
