= The Lords of the New Church =

English/American band

- Genres: Post-punk; gothic rock; new wave
- Years active: 1981–1989, 2001–2003, 2007, 2023
- Labels: I.R.S.; Illegal; Perfect Beat; Bondage International; NDN
- Past members: Stiv Bators; Brian James; Dave Tregunna; Nick Turner; Grant Fleming; Alastair Symons; Danny Fury; Steven "Skid" Marque; Jez Miller; Ozzy; Adam Becvare; Steve Murray

The Lords of the New Church were a British-American rock band. A supergroup, the line-up originally consisted of four musicians from 1970s punk bands. This line-up comprised vocalist Stiv Bators (ex-the Dead Boys), guitarist Brian James (ex-the Damned), bassist Dave Tregunna (ex-Sham 69) and drummer Nick Turner (ex-the Barracudas). Launched in 1981, the band released three studio albums prior to their dissolution in 1989. During this time, they underwent several line-up changes.

More melodic and slickly produced than most punk, their music both reached a broader audience than that of many bands in the genre and alienated hardcore punk fans. The band presented a stylized tribal identity around their appearance and their music that fans embraced: the writer Dave Thompson asserts this represented "the first time since the Sex Pistols' Bromley Contingent fanbase [that] a band had succeeded in grafting its own identity onto its audience without first paying obeisance to the gods of highstreet fashion." Their stage antics became notorious early in their career, with Bators stunts on one occasion reportedly resulting in his clinical death for several minutes.

The band experienced moderate chart success, with their eponymous debut album peaking at No. 3 on the UK Indie Chart, 1984's The Method to Our Madness hitting No. 158 in the US, and the 1985 Killer Lords compilation reaching No. 22 on the UK Indie Chart. Charting singles included "New Church" (No. 34 UK Indie), "Open Your Eyes" (No. 7 UK Indie; No. 27 US Mainstream Rock), "Dance with Me" (No. 85 UK Singles Chart) and a cover of Madonna's "Like a Virgin" (No. 22 UK Indie).

The band was re-established between 2001–2003, and again briefly in 2007, with original members James and Tregunna. The band reunited for a final time, prior to James’ death, with ex-Hanoi Rocks singer Michael Monroe, at the behest of Vive Le Rock magazine, at their annual awards show at London's Shepherds Bush Empire on 6 April 2023. Former Clash, Hanoi Rocks and original Lords drummer Terry Chimes took Turner's place, except for 'New Rose', played by Rat Scabies, who'd just presented James with the Pioneer Award.

== History ==
=== Formation (1980–1981) ===
Stiv Bators and Brian James first met each other in 1977 when the Dead Boys opened for the Damned on a few CBGB dates in New York and an English tour. They had remained good friends and the two had often discussed working together on a project after their respective bands had disbanded. The opportunity would come in 1980, when Bators was invited to London to join British punk band Sham 69, who had recently parted ways with their singer Jimmy Pursey. Bators had met the band in Los Angeles a few months before, and they had got on well together. James: "That was really the ticket to get Stiv over to London, so we could work. So they'd be rehearsing for this thing and getting it together, while me and Stiv in private would be working on stuff which was to become Lords stuff." With a change of name to the Wanderers, the short-lived band released only one album before disbanding in 1981. This finally allowed Bators and James to form their own band, having already aroused the interest of Miles Copeland, co-founder of I.R.S. Records. They experimented with different rhythm sections, rehearsing with bassists Tony James and Glen Matlock, and drummers Terry Chimes and Steve Nicol. James: "Musically it sounded alright, but ... personality wise it just wasn't kind of fitting. So it was like me and Stiv and "the other two" all the time." Bators then approached his Wanderers bandmate Dave Tregunna and, with Rat Scabies of the Damned on drums, they performed a one-off gig in London at Hammersmith Clarendon as The Dead Damned Sham Band. Their set consisted of Dead Boys, Damned and Sham 69 material, as well as covers. Since Scabies was already committed to the Damned, they soon recruited Nick "Nicky" Turner of the Barracudas as their full-time drummer. Billed as the Things, the new band played their first gig in Paris in late 1981.

While brainstorming band names, Copeland had suggested the Lords of Discipline. At the time, he was also managing Sting, who had started to venture into acting, and one of the scripts that was presented to Sting was for the film The Lords of Discipline. James: "So Miles said, "Oh, great name for the band, boys! ... And we kind of thought, "Well, not really, especially if there's gonna be a film coming out with that name also." The band, however, liked the idea of calling themselves the Lords and they eventually settled on the Lords of the New Church.

=== The I.R.S. years (1982–1985) ===
Having signed with Copeland's I.R.S. Records, Copeland also took on managerial duties, the Lords of the New Church released their self-produced eponymous debut album in July 1982. Musically, the album is a mix of punk, glam, garage rock and goth, described by New Noise Magazine as a "seedy concoction of spidery guitars, sleazy bass lines, jungle drums and gothic keyboards." For the subsequent tour, the band enhanced their live sound with keyboardist Matt Irving, who had also played on the album. The Lords of the New Church was well-received and peaked at No. 3 on the UK Indie Chart. The single "Open Your Eyes" reached No. 7 on the UK Indie Chart, No. 34 on the Canadian charts and No. 27 on the US Rock chart. Two other singles, "New Church" and "Russian Roulette", reached No. 34 and No. 12 on the UK Indie Chart, respectively.

Is Nothing Sacred?, their second album released in September 1983, saw the band diversifying musically, incorporating new wave, classic rock and ska, along with synths, horns and a greater emphasis on the bass. Like their first album, Is Nothing Sacred? was produced by the band themselves, except for its first single - a cover version of "Live for Today" (No. 91 UK) - which was produced by Todd Rundgren. The success of the album's second single "Dance with Me" (No. 85 UK), a song that according to Dave Thompson's Alternative Rock came "close to a hit", was hampered when the video directed by Derek Jarman was pulled from MTV's rotation because, according to writer Colin Larkin, mistaken concerns were voiced about pedophilia. The song was later covered by Nouvelle Vague in 2006.

Their third album, 1984's The Method to Our Madness, peaked at No. 158 on the US Billboard 200, while the single "M Style" reached No. 97 on the UK Single Chart. Two further singles, "Method to My Madness" and "When the Blood Runs Cold (Special Remix)", failed to chart. The album was produced by Chris Tsangarides, who had previously worked with hard rock acts like Thin Lizzy, Gary Moore and Tygers of Pan Tang. The Method to Our Madness was remixed for a 1985 US release. Mark Taylor replaced Irving as the band's new touring member.

In early 1985, the Lords recorded Madonna's "Like a Virgin" and released it as a single a few months later. James: "That was Miles' idea. It got nothing to do with us at all. We saw him in the office one day and he said, "I got this great idea." The single gained the band some attention and radio airplay, taking it to No. 2 on the UK Indie Chart in May. That same month, according to Bators, the band were dropped by I.R.S. but were still supported by the label's management side. Around the same time, two songs were recorded for a planned follow-up single that never materialized: "Lord's Prayer", written for the band by T.V. Smith, and a cover of Creedence Clearwater Revival's "Hey Tonight". Both songs were produced by Steven Van Zandt and included on the compilation album Killer Lords in late 1985.

Tregunna had for some time been dissatisfied with the band's management, convinced that they were being exploited by Copeland. He eventually left the band around the turn of the year to join Andy McCoy's Cherry Bombz. Bators said in March 1986: "We were supposed to do a tour of England in November and that would have held us over with enough money to survive. Two weeks before the tour started, I.R.S. stopped the release of the album [Killer Lords], which made all the promoters back out. ... Dave had no money and on Christmas Eve he was evicted from his flat. ... He had nowhere to go and we'd stopped touring, so he went with Cherry Bombz."

=== Final years and disbandment (1986–1989) ===
By early 1986, the Lords had replaced Tregunna with Grant Fleming (ex-Kidz Next Door), and augmented its lineup with a second guitarist, Alastair Symons (ex-The Dirty Strangers). Without a record deal, the band spent most of the year touring the US and Europe. They contributed two songs to I.R.S.'s soundtrack for The Texas Chainsaw Massacre 2: "Good to Be Bad" and "Mind Warp". The songs weren't written specifically with the film in mind, according to Bators: "They were actual Lords' songs. When we got approached about it, I read the script and adapted the lyrics to it." When asked in 1986 how the Lords ended up on the soundtrack, Bators said: "Miles is our manager, publisher and ex-record company. So, our manager approached our publisher, who approached his record company."

In 1987, German independent label Perfect Beat released the Lords' rerecorded version of their 1983 single "Dance with Me". It was the last recording to feature Symons before he left the band shortly after. Produced by Vic Maile, the Psycho Sex EP followed later in 1987, released through the French label Bondage International. "Real Bad Time" was released as a separate single from the EP.

Turner and Fleming both left the band at the end of 1987 to be replaced by Danny Fury and a returning Tregunna in 1988. The Lords continued to gig around England and Europe for the next year and a half. In 1988, Illegal released the live album Live at the Spit, recorded in Boston during the Lords' first American tour in 1982. Perfect Beat released two further live albums in 1988 and 1989: Scene of the Crime, recorded in Zürich in January 1985; and Second Coming, recorded during an October 1988 tour of Germany. A studio recording of The Creation's "Making Time" was released as a single in 1988 by Perfect Beat.

The Lords of the New Church broke up when Bators ended the band onstage after a concert on 2 May 1989, at the London Astoria. In order to pay off a tax bill, the Lords had booked a tour in spring of 1989. When Bators was told about the forthcoming gigs, he declined to do them. "Stiv said he couldn't do those shows because apparently he's hurt his back very badly", Tregunna said in 2003. When Bators, who by this time was living in Paris, eventually agreed to do only one show, the rest of the band decided to put an advert in the music press looking for a stand-in singer for the remaining dates. "We thought "If it looks like anyone could possibly do it, and it is a chance in a million, we'll then introduce him to Stiv", James said in 2007. "All these people came down, but none of them were right, so we thought "Let's not even mention this to Bators." ... And so we did this show at the Astoria in London and sure enough he came on at the end with a T-shirt with our ad on it, and started to fire us all."

Bators died after being struck by a car in Paris in 1990. James said in 2007: "The only other person I've really been able to write with was Stiv Bators ... Me and Stiv were fantastic. I've never really had that with anybody else. ... it was like the riff master and the lyric master working together."

=== Reformation (2001–2007) ===
The band was re-established in 2001 when vocalist Steven "Skid" Marque, co-vocalist and guitarist Jez Miller, and drummer Ozzy joined original members James and Tregunna for the recording of the "Believe it or Not" single, released by NDN Records in 2002. The band undertook a European tour in spring the same year. Miller and Ozzy departed the band after the UK leg of the tour and was replaced by Adam Becvare on vocals and guitar and Steve Murray on drums. This configuration of the band recorded the album Hang On in 2003, which was sold at gigs without any official record company release.

James, Tregunna, Becvare and former Lords touring keyboard player Mark Taylor reunited in October 2007 for a one-off 25th anniversary gig at the 100 Club in London.

== Band members ==
Former members

- Stiv Bators – vocals (1981–1989)
- Brian James – guitar (1981–1989, 2001–2003, 2007, 2023)
- Dave Tregunna – bass guitar (1981–1985, 1988–1989, 2001–2003, 2007, 2023)
- Nick Turner – drums (1981–1987)
- Grant Fleming – bass guitar (1986–1987)
- Alastair Symons – guitar (1986–1987)
- Danny Fury – drums (1988–1989)
- Steven "Skid" Marque – vocals (2001–2003)
- Jez Miller – vocals, guitar (2001–2002)
- Ozzy – drums (2001–2002)
- Adam Becvare – vocals, guitar (2002–2003, 2007)
- Steve Murray – drums (2002–2003)

Touring/Session members

- Rat Scabies – drums (1981, for one gig only)
- Matt Irving – keyboards (1982–1984)
- Mark Taylor – keyboards (1984–1987, 2007)
- Michael Monroe - Vocals (2023)

== Discography ==
=== Studio albums ===
- The Lords of the New Church, 1982 (Illegal, I.R.S.)
- Is Nothing Sacred?, 1983 (I.R.S.)
- The Method to Our Madness, 1984 (I.R.S.)
- Hang On, 2003 (Not on label)

=== Live albums ===
- Live at the Spit, 1988 (Illegal)
- Scene of the Crime, 1988 (Perfect Beat) (Germany)
- Second Coming, 1989 (Perfect Beat) (Germany)
- The Lords Prayers I, 2002 (NMC Music)
- Farewell Tour 1988, 2003 (Get Back) (Italy)
- Los Diablos, 2015 (Easy Action)
- Open Your Eyes, 2019 (Cleopatra)

=== Compilation albums ===
- Killer Lords, 1985 (Illegal, I.R.S.)
- The Anthology, 2000 (Remedy) (France)
- The Lords Prayers II, 2002 (NMC Music)
- Stories at Dusk, 2003 (Alchemy Entertainment)
- Rockers, 2007 (Easy Action)
- The Gospel Truth, 2012 (Easy Action)
- Truth Is The Sword Of Us All, 2024 (Gutterwail)

=== Extended plays ===
- Psycho Sex, 1987 (Bondage International) (France)
- Believe it or Not, 2002 (NDN Records)

=== Singles ===
Year	Single	UK	UK-IN	CAN	US-MR	Album
1982	"New Church"		34			The Lords of the New Church
1982	"Open Your Eyes"		7	34	27	The Lords of the New Church
1982	"Russian Roulette"		12			The Lords of the New Church
1983	"Live for Today"	91				Is Nothing Sacred?
1983	"Dance with Me"	85				Is Nothing Sacred?
1984	"M[urder] Style"	97				The Method to Our Madness
1984	"Method to My Madness"					The Method to Our Madness
1985	"When the Blood Runs Cold (Special Remix)"					The Method to Our Madness
1985	"Like a Virgin"	96	2			Killer Lords
1987	"Real Bad Time"					Psycho Sex EP
1987	"Dance with Me (1987 Version)"					Non-album singles
1989	"Making Time"					Non-album singles
2004	"Heaven Stepped Down"					Hang On

=== Other appearances ===
- The Texas Chainsaw Massacre 2 Soundtrack, 1986 (I.R.S.) – "Good to Be Bad", "Mind Warp"
