= Margaret Plant =

Australian art historian

Margaret Plant OAM FAHA is a Professor of Australian art history, and as of 1996 Emeritus Professor of Visual Arts at Monash University.

== Career ==
Born in South Australia in 1940, Plant grew up in Williamstown and as a schoolgirl saw paintings by John Perceval of fishing boats in the suburb's harbour in Melbourne, and later wrote the first monograph on the artist.

Plant began tutoring in the University of Melbourne Department of Fine Arts in 1962 until 1965 and completed a Master of Arts in 1969 there with her thesis The Realm of the Curtain : Paul Klee and Theatre. Awarded a Pro Helvetia residency in 1967, she studied Klee's work in the Klee-Stiftung in Bern, Switzerland. She wrote art criticism for newspapers The Age and The Australian between 1965 and 1970. With Ursula Hoff she wrote on contemporary art in The National Gallery of Victoria; Painting, Drawing, Sculpture published in 1968, and that year was appointed Lecturer at RMIT University. Hers was the first academic appointment of an art historian within an Australian art school; she was made Senior Lecturer there, a position she held until 1975.

Plant returned to the University of Melbourne as Senior Lecturer in Fine Arts from 1975 to 82. She completed her doctoral dissertation, Fresco Painting in Avignon and Northern Italy : a study of some fourteenth century cycles of saints' lives outside Tuscany in 1982.

From 1982–96, a long association with Monash University as Professor of Visual Arts followed, and she has continued there as Emeritus Professor. Frequently a presenter at events and exhibitions at the National Gallery of Victoria, the National Gallery of Australia and Artists' Week during the Adelaide Festival of the Arts.

From 1984-87 Plant was appointed to the Council of the Australian National Gallery, where on her retirement it was noted that her "contribution as one of Australia's leading academics in the field of visual arts, together with her particular knowledge of Australian art, was invaluable."

Plant's research and writing is wide-ranging, in catalogue essays, academic papers, book reviews, journal articles and monographs, from 14th century Padua to J. M. W. Turner and Paul Klee to settlers' domestication of the Australian bush. In 1995 she published Painting Australia a children's introduction to Australian art.

In 2002, Venice: Fragile City 1797-1997 was published by Yale University Press. The Economist reviewer greeted it "as far the most comprehensive and lovingly researched history of Venice since Napoleon sacked the city". The architectural historian, Richard Goy, wrote that it was "an encyclopaedic and much-needed work, which will become, no doubt, a benchmark for future cultural studies for the post-Republican city. The book studies the deterioration of Venice during French and Austrian occupation, but, at the same time, its cultural resilience in many fields - literature, local and foreign, opera, glass-making, lace-making, and its high tourist value. And more and more its task in withstanding destruction from the sea.

Paul Giles in the Australian Book Review hailed Plant's 2017 book Love and Lament: An essay on the Arts in Australia in the Twentieth Century, as "multivalent, wide-angled" and "ranging widely across architecture, film, photography, music, dance, and popular culture, as well as literature and painting [demonstrating] convincingly that, as she puts it, there was 'no dormant period' in Australian cultural and artistic life during this time."

== Honours ==
Plant was elected to the Australian Academy of the Humanities in 1985. She was awarded the Medal of the Order of Australia in the 2025 Australia Day Honours.

Monash University instituted the 'Margaret Plant Annual Lecture in Art History' in 2018, at which presenters have been James Meyer, curator, National Gallery of Art, Washington, in 2018; Christina Barton, director of the Adam Art Gallery Te Pātaka Toi, at the Victoria University of Wellington, in 2019; Ming Tiampo, Professor of Art History, Centre for Transnational Cultural Analysis at Carleton University, Ottawa, Canada, in 2021; in 2022, Erika Wolf, research fellow at the Neboltai Collection of 20th Century Propaganda; in 2023 Andrea Bubenik, Associate Professor of Art History at the University of Queensland.

== Publications ==
=== Books ===
- Plant, Margaret (1966). Impressionists and Post Impressionists. Oxford University Press.
- Plant, Margaret (1968). National Gallery of Victoria: a painting, drawing, sculpture. University of Melbourne.
- Plant, Margaret (1969). The Realm of the Curtain: Paul Klee and Theatre. Lansdowne Press.
- Plant, Margaret (1970). John Perceval. Melbourne: Lansdowne Press. ISBN 9780701803506.
- Plant, Margaret (1973). Austrália Bienal de São Paulo 1973: Jan Senbergs and John Armstrong; catalogue of an exhibition; introduced by Margaret Plant. Australian Council for the Arts, Bienal Internacional de São Paulo. OCLC 220010032.
- Plant, Margaret (1973). Melbourne Printmakers. National Gallery of Victoria. OCLC 954567943.
- Plant, Margaret (1974). Paul Klee exhibition: Adelaide, Sydney, Melbourne, 1974. 1974. Art Gallery of South Australia, Art Gallery of New South Wales, National Gallery of Victoria: Visual Arts Board. OCLC 935584656.
- Plant, Margaret (1977). French Impressionists and Post-Impressionists: National Gallery of Victoria. Rev. ed. Gallery 19771976 (Revised ed.). Melbourne: National Gallery of Victoria. ISBN 9780724100514. OCLC 4055743.
- Plant, Margaret (1978). Paul Klee: Figures and Faces. Thames and Hudson. ISBN 9780500232743. OCLC 450969968.
- Galbally, Ann; Plant, Margaret (1978). Studies in Australian Art. Melbourne: Dept. of Fine Arts, University of Melbourne. ISBN 9780909454937. OCLC 6943784.
- Plant, Margaret (1982). John Brack Nudes: Fifteen Original Lithographs (Limited ed.). Lyre Bird Press. ISBN 9780949840028. OCLC 27621379.
- Plant, Margaret (1983). Renaissance Gardens - Italy. Dept. of Visual Arts, Monash University.
- Plant, Margaret (1985). Irreverent Sculpture: 1-30 August 1985. Clayton, Victoria: Monash University Gallery. ISBN 9780867463828. OCLC 27574327.
- Plant, Margaret (1995). Painting Australia: A Child's Guide to Australian Paintings. Roseville East, N.S.W: Craftsman House in Association with G B Arts International. ISBN 9789766410025. OCLC 38378703.
- Plant, Margaret (2002). Venice Fragile City, 1797-1997. New Haven [Conn.]: Yale University Press. ISBN 0300083866.
- Plant, Margaret (2017). Love and Lament: An Essay on the Arts in Australia in the Twentieth Century. Port Melbourne, Victoria: Thames & Hudson. ISBN 9780500500644. OCLC 1007041739.

=== Articles ===
- Plant, Margaret (Spring 1974). "Paul Klee Exhibition: Adelaide Sydney Melbourne 1974". Art and Australia. 12 (2): 37.
- Galbally, Ann; Plant, Margaret (1978). "Australian artists abroad; 1880-1914". Studies in Australian Art.
- Galbally, Ann; Plant, Margaret (1978). "Quattrocento Melbourne; Aspects of Finish 1973-1977". Studies in Australian Art.
- Plant, Margaret (1980). "Janet Dawson's Abstract Painting". Art & Australia. 17 (4): 337–345.
- Plant, Margaret (1981). "Portraits and Politics in Late Trecento Padua : Altichiero's Frescoes in the S. Felice Chapel, S. Antonio". The Art Bulletin. 63 (3). The College Art Association of American: 406–425. doi:10.1080/00043079.1981.10787903.
- Plant, Margaret (1982). Dean, Sonia (ed.). "The Encounter of Baldessin and Tillers on an Etching Plate: 'According to Des Esseintes' 1976". Art Bulletin of Victoria (22). Melbourne: Council of Trustees of the National Gallery of Victoria, with the generous assistance of The Art Foundation of Victoria and the National Gallery Society of Victoria: 12–24. ISBN 0-7241-0083-0. ISSN 0066-7935.
- Plant, Margaret (12 May 1982). Hill, Beryl (ed.). "Tribute to Fred Williams: National Gallery of Victoria". Art Bulletin of Victoria (23). Melbourne: Council of Trustees of the National Gallery of Victoria with the generous assistance of The Art Foundation of Victoria and the National Gallery Society of Victoria. ISSN 0066-7935.
- Plant, Margaret (1982). "'The Vaults of the Chapel of Saint Martial, Palace of the Popes, Avignon: Frescoes of Matteo Giovannetti". Notes in the History of Art. 2 (1 ed.). The University of Chicago Press: 6–11. doi:10.1086/sou.2.1.23202245.
- Plant, Margaret; Hueston, John (1982). "'Hands before Faces - The Evolution of Gesture in Fourteenth-Century Frescos". Annals of Plastic Surgery. 9 (5). The University of Chicago Press: 436–444. doi:10.1097/00000637-198211000-00015. PMID 6758675.
- Plant, Margaret (1986). "Paul Klee's Perspectives". Australian Journal of Art. 5 (1): 104–112. doi:10.1080/03146464.1986.11432883.
- Plant, Margaret (1988). Dean, Sonia; Hill, Beryl (eds.). "The lost art of Federation: Australia's quest for modernism". Art Bulletin of Victoria (28). Melbourne: Council of Trustees of the National Gallery of Victoria, with the assistance of The Art Foundation of Victoria and the National Gallery Society of Victoria. ISSN 0066-7935.
- Plant, Margaret (1988). "Dale Hickey". Dale Hickey a Retrospective Exhibition. Ballarat: City of Ballarat Fine Art Gallery: 1–11.
- Plant, Margaret (1990). "'Bereft of all but her Loveliness': Change and Conservation in nineteenth century Venice". Transition: Discourse on Architecture. 3: 7–37. OCLC 7128670158.
- Plant, Margaret (1991). "Endisms and Apocalypses in the 1980s". Art and Text (39): 29–36. OCLC 7128663401.
- Plant, Margaret (1991). "'No one enters Venice as a stranger': a history and theory of (Venetian) guidebooks". Transition: Discourse on Architecture (34): 56–80.
- Plant, Margaret (Summer 1992). "Ten Years of the Australian National Gallery". Art and Australia. 30 (2). Sydney, Australia: Janet Gough + Fine Arts Press Pty Ltd: 197–208.
- Plant, Margaret (1993). Lloyd, Michael; Gott, Ted; Chapman, Christopher (eds.). "Shopping for the Marvellous: the Life of the City in Surrealism". Surrealism, Revolution by Night. Canberra: National Gallery of Australia: 82–105.
- Plant, Margaret (1994). "The Painted Garden: Gardens in Australian Art" (PDF). Art and Australia. 32 (1): 50–65.
- Plant, Margaret (1995). "Bounded Room, Boundless Sea, Susan Norrie in the Mid-1990s'". Susan Norrie: Projects 1990-1995. Melbourne: Heide Museum of Modern Art: 25–31.
- Plant, Margaret (1997). "Compost, a desultory aesthetic. [A version of this essay was given during Artists' Week, Adelaide Arts Festival, Norwood RSL Hall, March 1996.]". Art and Australia. 34 (3): 356. OCLC 7128717926.
- Plant, Margaret (2001). "John Perceval 1923-2000". Art and Australia. 38 (3): 389–390.
- Plant, Margaret (2003). "The Journey from Field to Fieldwork 1968 - 2003". Eyeline. 51 (3): 44–46. ISSN 0818-8734. OCLC 7855059767.
- Plant, Margaret (2012). Cramer, Sue (ed.). "Paul Partos". Less is More: Minimal + Post-Minimal Art in Australia. Bulleen: Heide Museum of Art: 104.
