= Brian James (guitarist) =

British guitarist (1951–2025)

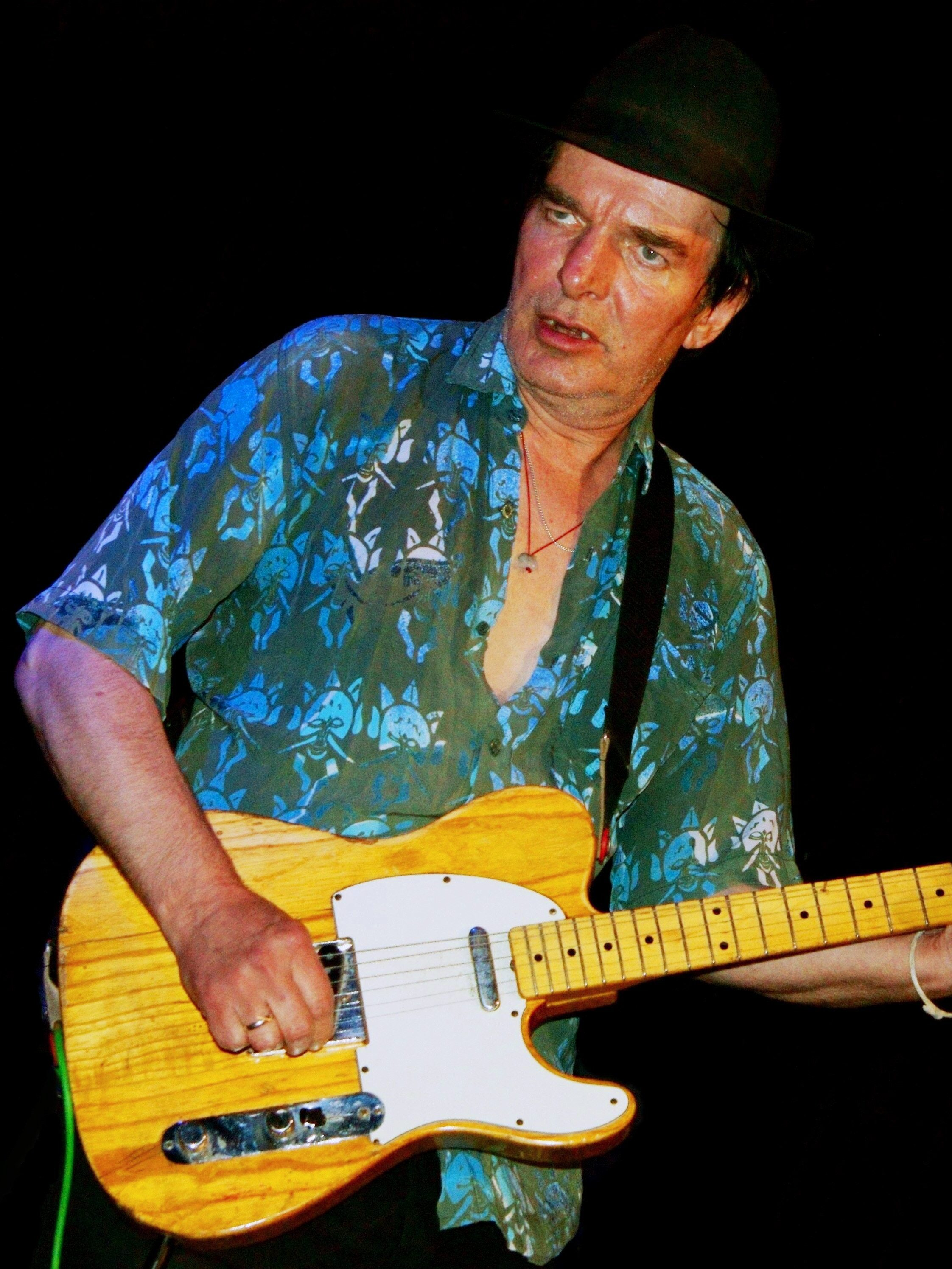
- James performing in 2012

Background information
- Born: Brian Graham Robertson; 18 February 1951; Hammersmith, London, England
- Died: 6 March 2025 (aged 74)
- Genres: Rock; punk rock; goth rock; garage rock
- Occupations: Musician; songwriter
- Instrument: Guitar
- Years active: 1973–2025
- Labels: Stiff; BJ; Illegal; New Rose; Easy Action; Devils Jukebox
- Formerly of: London SS; The Damned; The Lords of the New Church; Tanz Der Youth; Bastard; The Brian James Gang; The Dripping Lips; The Racketeers

Brian James (born Brian Graham Robertson, 18 February 1951 – 6 March 2025) was an English punk rock guitarist, who was a founding member of the Damned as well as of the Lords of the New Church.

== Life and career ==
James was born in Hammersmith, London on 18 February 1951. He began his musical career in 1973 by forming garage rock outfit Bastard, which James eventually decamped to Belgium to get gigs as there were few bookings in the UK on account of the band's name. James played in proto-punk group London SS, alongside Mick Jones, later of The Clash. James then co-founded The Damned, writing almost all the material on their first two albums (Damned Damned Damned and Music for Pleasure) before leaving at the end of 1977.

In the following years James formed the short-lived Tanz Der Youth together with Andy Colqhoun on bass, Alan Powell (ex-Hawkwind, ex-Chicken Shack) on drums, and Tony Moore (previously of Iron Maiden) on keyboards. They toured with Black Sabbath on the Never Say Die! Tour and released the single "I'm Sorry, I'm Sorry" / "Delay" in 1978. James then played in Iggy Pop's solo touring band (1979) and recorded his first two solo singles, "Ain't That a Shame" (1979) and "Why? Why? Why?" (1982), both with Stewart Copeland on drums. He also guested on proto punk forerunners The Saints' 1982 album, Out in the Jungle.

He later co-founded and played in The Lords of the New Church with Stiv Bators. The band recorded three studio albums and one EP, along with several live albums, from 1982 until their break-up in 1989.

In June 1988, James reunited with The Damned for two shows at The London Town and Country Club UK (now renamed O2 Forum Kentish Town).

Over a decade after his first solo single, he used the time without a band to record his eponymous solo debut album for the New Rose label in 1990. It featured long-time collaborators Malcolm Mortimore on drums and Alan Lee Shaw on bass.

From 1992 to 1996, James played guitar with the Brussels-based band the Dripping Lips. In 1992 he was invited by Scottish vocalist Robbie Kelman to co-write the soundtrack for the film Abracadabra, directed by Harry Cleven. The subsequent soundtrack album, produced by Kelman, was released in Benelux by EMI/INDISC. The band was composed by Robbie Kelman on vocals, James on guitar, Alan Lee Shaw on bass and Paul Zahl (ex-Flamin' Groovies) on drums. Kelman brought in his friend and record producer Jimmy Miller to helm their second album, Ready to Crack. Shaw had moved on to play guitar in The Damned, and Nico Mansy replaced him on bass.

In 2001, James recorded the album Mad for the Racket with MC5's Wayne Kramer (guitar), Duff McKagan (bass), Stewart Copeland and Clem Burke (drums) as Racketeers. Following that, James, together with Dave Tregunna, reformed The Lords of the New Church in 2002–2003 with vocalist Adam Becvare. The lineup recorded the ten-song unreleased CD Hang On and toured Europe in spring of that year.

When this incarnation of the Lords finished, James formed another solo outfit: the Brian James Gang. With James on vocals and guitar, the rhythm section of Dave Tregunna (bass) and Steve Murray (drums), the band was completed by Austen Gayton as additional guitarist. Within a year they released the single "New Rose 2006" and a self-titled album.

In 2012, he released a solo acoustic album Chateau Brian with former Lords of the New Church touring keyboard player Mark Taylor. In 2013, he revisited the material he played in his Damned years, both live by performing throughout the UK with Damned bandmate Rat Scabies and by re-recording nine Damned songs for his third solo album, Damned If I Do. In 2015 he released a new studio album, The Guitar That Dripped Blood, which featured guest appearances from Cheetah Chrome and Adam Becvare.

In October 2022, James reunited with Scabies, Sensible and Vanian for five Damned shows in the UK.

James died on 6 March 2025, at the age of 74. The cause of death was not shared.

== Discography ==
=== With the Damned ===
- Damned Damned Damned (1977), Stiff
- Music for Pleasure (1977), Stiff

=== With Tanz Der Youth ===
- "I'm Sorry, I'm Sorry" (Single, 1978), Radar

=== With the Lords of the New Church ===
- The Lords of the New Church (1982), (Illegal, I.R.S.)
- Is Nothing Sacred? (1983), I.R.S.
- The Method to Our Madness (1984), I.R.S.
- Hang On (2003), Not on label

=== With the Dripping Lips ===
- Abracadabra (Original Motion Picture Soundtrack) (1993), Indisc
- Ready to Crack? (1998), Alive Records

=== With the Racketeers ===
- Mad for the Racket (2000), Track Records

=== Solo ===
Albums

- Brian James (1990), New Rose Records
- The Brian James Gang (2006), Easy Action
- Chateau Brian (2012), Devils Jukebox Records
- Damned If I Do (2013), Easy Action
- The Guitar That Dripped Blood (2015), Easy Action
- Kicks and Diabolik Licks (2025), Easy Action

Singles

- "Ain't That a Shame" (1979), BJ Records
- "Why? Why? Why?" (1982), Illegal
- "New Rose 2001" (2001), Boss Tuneage, Fuxony Records (with Flatpig)
- "New Rose 2006" (2006), Easy Action
- "Walkin' Round Naked" (2015), Easy Action
- "Too Hot to Pop" (2017), Easy Action

Extended Plays

- "Anniversary Waltz EP" (2016), Easy Action
