= Nick Turner =

- Also known as: Nicky Turner
- Occupation: Drummer

Nick Turner, sometimes credited as Nicky Turner, is a drummer who briefly played with The Raincoats and became a founding member of The Barracudas. He left that band to help form The Lords of the New Church. In August 2015 he was invited to play drums for the band 69 Cats, a group made up of members from bands including The 69 Eyes, The Cramps, The Rockats and others. This marked his first time playing drums live in 28 years.

In 1993 Turner entered into a joint venture with I.R.S. Records, heading the new Shock Therapy label.

Turner has been a technology innovator since late 1994 when he produced the first ever live video concert broadcast with a major label band on the Internet and organized the first video 'fan' conference with members of the classic rock band, The Doors.

He launched Rocktropolis in early 1995, one of the web's earliest music websites, 'rock n roll's first virtual city,' that received significant media attention.

In the late 1990s he became a vice president at N2K.

Turner's drumsticks were featured for 8 years in the Rock and Roll Hall of Fame, one of the largest drumstick collections in the world.
