= List of works by David Hasselhoff =

This is a list of works by American actor and musician David Hasselhoff.

== Discography ==
David Hasselhoff discography
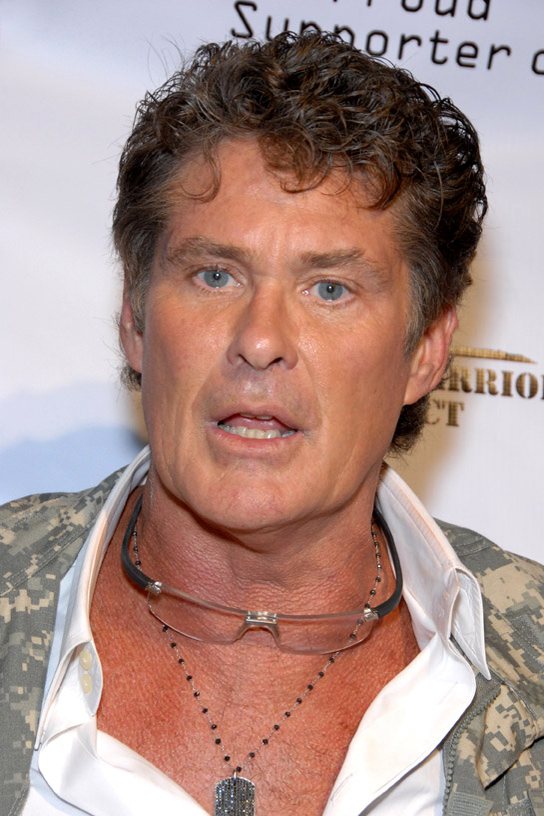
- David Hasselhoff attending the "Stars and Stripes" benefit for Wounded Warriors at the Playboy Mansion on May 16, 2009
- Studio albums: 15
- Compilation albums: 12

David Hasselhoff released fifteen studio albums and twelve compilation albums. In 1983, Hasselhoff released his debut single, "I Get The Message", which couldn't enter the charts. In January 1985, he released his debut studio album, Night Rocker, which peaked at number one in Austria, and was certified Platinum there; it also reached the top-thirty in Germany. The album includes "Our First Night Together", a duet with his then-wife Catherine Hickland, which peaked at number 14 in Switzerland. His second album, Lovin' Feelings, was released in 1987, which reached the top-twenty in Austria and Germany, and was certified Gold in the former country.

In 1988, Hasselhoff released the song "Looking for Freedom", which became his biggest international hit of his career, peaking at number one in Austria, Germany and Switzerland. It also reached number four on the European Hot 100 Singles chart; the top-twenty in France and Belgium; and the top-forty in the Netherlands. The song was certified Platinum in Germany, and later became the best-performing single of 1989 in Germany and Switzerland. On June 21, 1989, Hasselhoff released his third studio album of the same name, which also includes the singles "Is Everybody Happy", which reached the top-ten in Germany and Switzerland; and "Flying on the Wings of Tenderness", which peaked at number 22 in Germany. The album was a commercial success, peaking inside the top-five in Austria, Germany and Switzerland. His first compilation album, Knight Lover, was released later that year, and met with moderate success, peaking at numbers 17 and 32 in Switzerland and Germany, respectively.

In August 1990, Hasselhoff released his fourth studio album, Crazy for You, which became his best-selling album of his career, peaking at number one in Austria and Switzerland, and also reaching the top-ten in Germany. The album was another commercial success, being certified triple-Platinum in Switzerland, double-Platinum in Austria, and Platinum in Germany. The album's title track peaked at number four in Austria, and reached the top-twenty in Germany, and the top-thirty in Switzerland. However, the second single, "Freedom for the World", met with moderate success, peaking at numbers 30 and 48 in Austria and Germany, respectively. In September 1991, Hasselhoff released his fifth studio album, David, which continued his success in Europe, being Hasselhoff's third number-one album in Austria (where it was certified double-Platinum), and also being another top-ten album in Germany and Switzerland (where it was certified Platinum in both countries). The lead single, "Do the Limbo Dance", became Hasselhoff's second number-one single in Austria (where it was certified Gold), and also did well in Germany and Switzerland, reaching the top-twenty in both countries. The following singles were another hits in Austria: "Gipsy Girl" (peaked at number 12) and "Hands Up for Rock 'n' Roll" (peaked at number 30). His second compilation For You was released later that year, but failed to chart.

In September 1992, Hasselhoff's sixth studio album Everybody Sunshine was released. Though it was certified Gold in Austria, Germany and Switzerland, it failed to reach the commercial heights of his previous albums. The album's title track reached the top-thirty in Austria and Switzerland; however, the second single, "The Girl Forever" only peaked at number 78 in Germany. In November 1993, Hasselhoff released his seventh studio album You Are Everything, which performed slightly better than its predecessor, but became a moderate commercial success. The album was certified Gold in Austria (where it reached the top-ten) and Switzerland; and includes the songs "If I Could Only Say Goodbye", which became his first song to enter the UK Singles chart, peaking at number 35; and "Wir zwei allein" which became a top-ten hit in Austria (which was certified Gold there), Germany and Switzerland. A third compilation album, Crazy for You was released later that year, but failed to chart. In October 1994, Hasselhoff released his eighth studio album Du, which became a commercial disappointment, being his first album not to receive any certification in Europe, and performing moderately in Austria, Germany and Switzerland. The singles from Du –"Summer of Love" and the title track– failed to chart worldwide. In 1995, Hasselhoff released four compilation albums: the first one, his self-titled album, was released in the United States, and became his first release there since Lovin' Feelings in 1987. As an attempt to launch his singing career in the US, both the album and the single to promote it, "Fallin' in Love" became very unsuccessful and didn't enter any Billboard single or album chart. Other compilations includes Watch Out for the Bay, Is Everybody Happy and Looking for... the Best (which peaked at number 50 in Austria).

As departing with Ariola Records and BMG Music, Hasselhoff signed with Polydor Records and released his ninth studio album, Hooked on a Feeling in November 1997. Though the album's title track peaked inside the top-forty in Austria, the album was very unsuccessful, becoming his first album that failed to chart in Germany, but it did well in Czech Republic (where it peaked at number 11). In Austria and Switzerland, sales were moderate, and became his lowest-selling album to that point of his career. Subsequent compilation albums were released, including Watch Out for Hasselhoff, The Very Best Of and Greatest Hits, which all of them failed to chart. In August 2004, Hasselhoff signed with Edel Records and released his tenth studio album David Hasselhoff Sings America, which performed better in Europe, peaking at numbers 11 and 27 in Austria and Germany, respectively. The Night Before Christmas, his eleventh studio album (and his first Christmas album) was released later that year in November, but received negative reviews and became his first album that failed to chart worldwide. In 2006, Hasselhoff released a cover of "Jump in My Car", which became his highest-charting single in the UK, debuting at number three. It became his first song to chart in Scotland (at number two), Ireland (at number 24) and Australia (at number 50). In 2011, Hasselhoff released his twelfth studio album A Real Good Feeling, which became a success in Austria and peaked at number three. However, his thirteenth studio album This Time Around failed to chart worldwide.

In 2015, Hasselhoff released the song "True Survivor", which became his first entry on the Canadian Hot 100, peaking at number 94. Four years later, he released his fourteenth studio album, Open Your Eyes in September 2019, which charted moderately in Austria, Germany and Switzerland. His fifteenth studio album Party Your Hasselhoff was released on September 3, 2021, and became Hasselhoff's highest-charting album in Germany, debuting at number four and including the Neil Diamond Song Sweet Caroline.

=== Studio albums ===
| Title | Album details | Peak chart positions | | | | Certifications |
| Title | Album details | AUT | CZ | GER | SWI | Certifications |
|---|---|---|---|---|---|---|
| Night Rocker | Released: January 1985; Label: Silver Blue / Epic | 1 | — | 30 | — | AUT: Platinum |
| Lovin' Feelings | Released: October 18, 1987; Label: CBS | 11 | — | 16 | — | AUT: Gold |
| Looking for Freedom | Released: June 21, 1989; Label: White / BMG | 5 | — | 5 | 3 | AUT: Platinum; GER: Platinum; SWI: 3× Platinum |
| Crazy for You | Released: August 6, 1990; Label: White / BMG | 1 | — | 7 | 1 | AUT: 2× Platinum; GER: Platinum; SWI: 3× Platinum |
| David | Released: September 9, 1991; Label: White / BMG | 1 | — | 8 | 7 | AUT: 2× Platinum; GER: Platinum; SWI: Platinum |
| Everybody Sunshine | Released: September 14, 1992; Label: White / BMG | 16 | — | 21 | 17 | AUT: Gold; GER: Gold; SWI: Gold |
| You Are Everything | Released: November 22, 1993; Label: Ariola / BMG | 10 | — | 20 | 27 | AUT: Gold; SWI: Gold |
| Du | Released: October 17, 1994; Label: Ariola / BMG | 21 | — | 43 | 41 | |
| Hooked on a Feeling | Released: November 10, 1997; Label: Polydor | 49 | 11 | — | 41 | |
| David Hasselhoff Sings America | Released: February 2, 2004; Label: Edel | 11 | — | 27 | — | |
| The Night Before Christmas | Released: November 8, 2004; Label: Edel | — | — | — | — | |
| A Real Good Feeling | Released: April 1, 2011; Label: Sony / Ariola | 3 | — | 26 | 53 | |
| This Time Around | Released: February 27, 2012; Label: Hoff | — | — | — | — | |
| Open Your Eyes | Released: September 27, 2019; Label: Cleopatra | 24 | — | 57 | 72 | |
| Party Your Hasselhoff | Released: September 3, 2021; Label: Restless / Schubert | 6 | — | 4 | 14 | |
"—" denotes releases that did not chart or was not released

=== Compilation albums ===
| Title | Album details | Peak chart positions | | |
| Title | Album details | AUT | GER | SWI |
|---|---|---|---|---|
| Knight Lover | Released: July 1989; Label: CBS | — | 36 | 17 |
| For You | Released: 1991; Label: Epic | — | — | — |
| Crazy for You | Released: 1993; Label: Ariola Express | — | — | — |
| David Hasselhoff | Released: April 11, 1995; Label: Critique | — | — | — |
| Is Everybody Happy | Released: June 12, 1995; Label: Ariola Express | — | — | — |
| Looking for... the Best | Released: October 9, 1995; Label: Ariola / BMG | 50 | — | — |
| Watch Out for Hasselhoff | Released: November 11, 1999; Label: Ariola Express / BMG | — | — | — |
| The Very Best of David Hasselhoff | Released: 2001; Label: Ariola / BMG | — | — | — |
| Greatest Hits | Released: February 23, 2004; Label: White / BMG | — | — | — |
| Das Allerbeste | Released: 2008; Label: White / Sony BMG | — | — | — |
| Feeling So High | Released: April 29, 2011; Label: Seven Days Music | — | — | — |
| Looking for Freedom - Das Beste! | Released: September 27, 2013; Label: Telamo / Warner Music | — | — | — |
"—" denotes releases that did not chart or was not released

=== Singles ===
| Year | Single | Peak chart positions | | | | | | | | | | Certifications | Album |
| Year | Single | AUS | AUT | BEL | CAN | FRA | GER | IRE | NDL | SWI | UK | Certifications | Album |
|---|---|---|---|---|---|---|---|---|---|---|---|---|---|
| 1983 | "I Get the Message" | — | — | — | — | — | — | — | — | — | — | | Non-album single |
| 1985 | "Do You Love Me" | — | — | — | — | — | — | — | — | — | — | | Night Rocker |
| 1987 | "Life Is Mostly Beautiful with You" | — | — | — | — | — | — | — | — | — | — | | Lovin' Feelings |
| 1987 | "Night Rocker" | — | — | — | — | — | — | — | — | — | — | | Night Rocker |
| 1988 | "Looking for Freedom" | — | 1 | 18 | — | 12 | 1 | — | 31 | 1 | — | GER: Platinum | Looking for Freedom |
| 1989 | "Is Everybody Happy" | — | — | 42 | — | — | 8 | — | — | 8 | — | | Looking for Freedom |
| 1989 | "Our First Night Together" (with Catherine Hickland) | — | — | — | — | — | — | — | — | 14 | — | | Night Rocker |
| 1989 | "Song of the Night" | — | — | — | — | — | — | — | — | — | — | | Looking for Freedom |
| 1989 | "Flying on the Wings of Tenderness" | — | — | — | — | — | 22 | — | — | — | — | | Looking for Freedom |
| 1989 | "Torero – Te Quiero" | — | — | — | — | — | — | — | — | — | — | | Looking for Freedom |
| 1989 | "Lonely Is the Night" | — | — | — | — | — | — | — | — | — | — | | Looking for Freedom |
| 1990 | "Je T'Aime Means I Love You" | — | — | — | — | — | — | — | — | — | — | | Looking for Freedom |
| 1990 | "Crazy for You" | — | 4 | — | — | — | 18 | — | — | 21 | — | | Crazy for You |
| 1990 | "Freedom for the World" | — | 30 | — | — | — | 48 | — | — | — | — | | Crazy for You |
| 1990 | "Let's Dance Tonight" | — | — | — | — | — | — | — | — | — | — | | Crazy for You |
| 1991 | "Do the Limbo Dance" | — | 1 | — | — | — | 12 | — | — | 19 | — | AUT: Gold | David |
| 1991 | "Gipsy Girl" | — | 12 | — | — | — | — | — | — | — | — | | David |
| 1991 | "Hands Up for Rock 'n' Roll" | — | 30 | — | — | — | — | — | — | — | — | | David |
| 1991 | "Are You Still In Love With Me" | — | — | — | — | — | — | — | — | — | — | | David |
| 1992 | "Casablanca" | — | — | — | — | — | — | — | — | — | — | | David |
| 1992 | "Everybody Sunshine" | — | 26 | — | — | — | — | — | — | 27 | — | | Everybody Sunshine |
| 1992 | "The Girl Forever" | — | — | — | — | — | 78 | — | — | — | — | | Everybody Sunshine |
| 1992 | "Darling I Love You" | — | — | — | — | — | — | — | — | — | — | | Everybody Sunshine |
| 1993 | "Dance Dance d'Amour" | — | — | — | — | — | — | — | — | — | — | | You Are Everything |
| 1993 | "If I Could Only Say Goodbye" | — | — | — | — | — | — | — | — | — | 35 | | You Are Everything |
| 1993 | "Wir zwei allein" (with Gwen) | — | 4 | — | — | — | 9 | — | — | 10 | — | AUT: Gold | You Are Everything |
| 1993 | "Pingu Dance" | — | — | — | — | — | — | — | — | — | — | | Non-album single |
| 1994 | "The Best Is Yet to Come" | — | — | — | — | — | — | — | — | — | — | | You Are Everything |
| 1994 | "Summer of Love" | — | — | — | — | — | — | — | — | — | — | | Du |
| 1994 | "Du" | — | — | — | — | — | — | — | — | — | — | | Du |
| 1994 | "Au Ciel, Une Etoile" (with Nadège) | — | — | — | — | — | — | — | — | — | — | | Non-album single |
| 1995 | "Fallin' in Love" | — | — | — | — | — | — | — | — | — | — | | David Hasselhoff |
| 1995 | "I Believe" (with Laura Branigan) | — | — | — | — | — | — | — | — | — | — | | Looking for... the Best |
| 1997 | "Hooked on a Feeling" | — | 36 | — | — | — | — | — | — | — | — | | Hooked on a Feeling |
| 1997 | "Hold On My Love" | — | — | — | — | — | — | — | — | — | — | | Hooked on a Feeling |
| 1997 | "More Than Words Can Say" (with Regine Velasquez) | — | — | — | — | — | — | — | — | — | — | | Hooked on a Feeling |
| 2004 | "City of New Orleans" | — | — | — | — | — | — | — | — | — | — | | David Hasselhoff Sings America |
| 2004 | "Please Come Home for Christmas" (with Gwen) | — | — | — | — | — | — | — | — | — | — | | The Night Before Christmas |
| 2005 | "Limbo Dance" (feat. DJ Ostkurve) | — | — | — | — | — | 98 | — | — | — | — | | Non-album single |
| 2006 | "Jump in My Car" | 50 | 61 | — | — | — | — | 24 | — | — | 3 | | Open Your Eyes |
| 2007 | "As I Am" (with Patricia Lewis) | — | — | — | — | — | — | — | — | — | — | | Non-album single |
| 2011 | "It's a Real Good Feeling" | — | — | — | — | — | — | — | — | — | — | | A Real Good Feeling |
| 2011 | "California Girl" | — | — | — | — | — | — | — | — | — | — | | A Real Good Feeling |
| 2013 | "Am I Ever Gonna See Your Face Again" | — | — | — | — | — | — | — | — | — | — | | Non-album single |
| 2015 | "True Survivor" | — | — | — | 94 | — | — | — | — | — | — | | Kung Fury |
| 2017 | "The Song of the Summer" (with Seven Bucks, Logan Paul & Desiigner) | — | — | — | — | — | — | — | — | — | — | | Non-album single |
| 2017 | "Guardians Inferno" | — | — | — | — | — | — | — | — | — | — | | Guardians of the Galaxy Vol. 2 |
| 2019 | "(You Made the) Summer Go Away" (featuring Blümchen) | — | — | — | — | — | — | — | — | — | — | | Non-album single |
| 2019 | "Open Your Eyes" (featuring James Williamson) | — | — | — | — | — | — | — | — | — | — | | Open Your Eyes |
| 2021 | "The Passenger" | — | — | — | — | — | — | — | — | — | — | | Party Your Hasselhoff |
| 2021 | "(I Just) Died in Your Arms" | — | — | — | — | — | — | — | — | — | — | | Party Your Hasselhoff |
| 2021 | "Sweet Caroline" | — | — | — | — | — | — | — | — | — | — | | Party Your Hasselhoff |
| 2021 | "I Was Made for Lovin' You" | — | — | — | — | — | — | — | — | — | — | | Party Your Hasselhoff |
"—" denotes releases that did not chart or was not released

== Filmography ==
=== Film ===
| Year | Title | Role | Notes |
|---|---|---|---|
| 1975 | The Lion Roars Again | Costume Model | Short film |
| 1976 | Revenge of the Cheerleaders | Boner | |
| 1979 | Starcrash | Prince Simon | |
| 1988 | Strong Times | David | |
| 1988 | Three Crazy Jerks II | Michael Trutz von Rhein | |
| 1988 | Witchery | Gary | |
| 1989 | W.B., Blue and the Bean | Roger "White Bread" Donaldson | |
| 1990 | The Final Alliance | Will Colton | |
| 1995 | Baywatch the Movie: Forbidden Paradise | Mitch Buchannon | |
| 1996 | Dear God | Himself | Uncredited |
| 1998 | Baywatch: White Thunder at Glacier Bay | Mitch Buchannon | |
| 1998 | Legacy | Jack Scott | |
| 1998 | Welcome to Hollywood | Himself | |
| 1999 | The Big Tease | Himself | |
| 2000 | The Target Shoots First | Himself | |
| 2001 | Jekyll & Hyde: Direct from Broadway | Dr. Henry Jekyll/Edward Hyde | |
| 2001 | Layover | Dan Morrison | |
| 2002 | The New Guy | Himself | |
| 2004 | Dodgeball: A True Underdog Story | Himself | |
| 2004 | A Dirty Shame | Himself | |
| 2004 | The SpongeBob SquarePants Movie | Himself | |
| 2005 | Fugitives Run | Clint | |
| 2006 | Click | John Ammer | |
| 2007 | Kickin' It Old Skool | Himself | |
| 2009 | To Live and Dine in L.A. | The Hoff | Short film |
| 2010 | Dancing Ninja | Ansel LaDouche / Mrs. LaDouche | |
| 2011 | Fuga de Cerebros 2 | Padre Quarterback | |
| 2011 | Hop | Himself | |
| 2012 | Piranha 3DD | Himself | |
| 2012 | Keith Lemon: The Film | Himself | |
| 2014 | Stretch | Himself | |
| 2015 | Kung Fury | Hoff 9000 (voice) | Short film |
| 2015 | Ted 2 | Himself | Uncredited; extended version |
| 2015 | Alleluia! The Devil's Carnival | The Designer | |
| 2017 | Guardians of the Galaxy Vol. 2 | The Form of David Hasselhoff | |
| 2017 | It's No Game | Hoffbot | Short film |
| 2017 | Baywatch | The Mentor | |
| 2017 | Killing Hasselhoff | Himself | |
| 2019 | Our Ladies | Himself | |
| 2021 | Sweet Disaster | Himself | |
| TBA | Kung Fury 2 | Hoff 9000 (voice) | Completed |

=== Television and internet ===
| Year | Title | Role | Notes |
|---|---|---|---|
| 1973 | The Dean Martin Show | British Guard | Episode: "8.26" |
| 1975 | Police Story | Parking Attendant | Episode: "The Man in the Shadows" |
| 1975–2010 | The Young and the Restless | Dr. William "Snapper" Foster Jr. | Main role (1975–1982); appearance (2010) |
| 1979 | Pleasure Cove | Scott | Television movie |
| 1980 | Semi-Tough | Shake Tiller | 4 episodes |
| 1980–1981 | The Love Boat | Tom Bell / Brian Kiley | 3 episodes |
| 1982–1986 | Knight Rider | Michael Knight | Main role; 89 episodes |
| 1984 | Diff'rent Strokes | Himself | 2 episodes |
| 1984 | Blondes vs. Brunettes | Himself | Television special |
| 1984 | Santa Barbara | Himself | Episode: "1.32" |
| 1984 | The Cartier Affair | Curt Taylor | Television movie |
| 1984 | Kids Incorporated | Himself | Episode: "School's for Fools" |
| 1985 | Bridge Across Time | Don Gregory | Television movie |
| 1988 | Perry Mason: The Case of the Lady in the Lake | Bill Travis | Television movie |
| 1989 | Baywatch: Panic at Malibu Pier | Mitch Buchannon | Television movie |
| 1989 | Fire and Rain | Dr. Dan Meyer | Television movie |
| 1989–2000 | Baywatch | Mitch Buchannon | Main role; 219 episodes |
| 1991 | Knight Rider 2000 | Michael Knight | Television movie |
| 1992 | The Bulkin Trail | Michael Bulkin | Television short |
| 1992 | Ring of the Musketeers | John Smith D'Artagnan | Television movie |
| 1994 | Avalanche | Duncan Snyder | Television movie |
| 1994 | Saturday Night Live | Himself | Episode: "John Turturro/Tom Petty and the Heartbreakers" |
| 1995–1997 | Baywatch Nights | Mitch Buchannon | Main role; 45 episodes |
| 1996 | Gridlock | Jake Gorsky | Television movie |
| 1997 | Night Man | Katrina's Assistant | Episode: "Pilot" |
| 1998 | Nick Fury: Agent of S.H.I.E.L.D. | Colonel Nick Fury | Television movie |
| 1999 | Action | Himself | Episode: "Mr. Dragon Goes to Washington" |
| 1999 | 3rd Rock from the Sun | Dr. Lasker | Episode: "Dick and Tuck" |
| 2000 | The West Wing | Himself | Episode: "20 Hours in L.A." |
| 2000 | One True Love | Mike Grant | Television movie |
| 2001 | Shaka Zulu: The Citadel | Mungo Prentice | Television movie |
| 2002 | Just Shoot Me! | Himself | Episode: "The Burning House" |
| 2003 | Baywatch: Hawaiian Wedding | Mitch Buchannon | Television film |
| 2003 | Whose Line Is It Anyway? | Himself | Episode: "Show No. 610" |
| 2006 | Still Standing | Gary Maddox | Episode: "Still Hairdressing" |
| 2006 | Wildboyz | Himself | Episode: "California" |
| 2006–2009 | America's Got Talent | Himself | Judge; 67 episodes |
| 2006–2012 | Robot Chicken | Various (Note: Buck Rogers/ Frog/ Galileo Seaworthy/Mopulus Moolah/Himself as Dar/Pop Tate/The Balladeer/Fisherman #2/Street Sharks Narrator) | 4 episodes |
| 2008 | Knight Rider | Michael Knight | Television film |
| 2008 | Anaconda 3: Offspring | Stephen Hammett | Television film |
| 2009 | Meet the Hasselhoffs | Himself | Main role; 6 episodes |
| 2010 | The Hasselhoffs | Himself | Main role; 2 episodes |
| 2011 | Britain's Got Talent | Himself | Judge; 18 episodes |
| 2011 | Sons of Anarchy | Dondo Elgarian | Episode: "Brick" |
| 2012 | Chasing the Hill | Governor Hasselhoff | Episode: "Awesomeness is a Warm Gun" |
| 2012 | The Christmas Consultant | Owen | Television movie |
| 2014–2015 | Newsreaders | Himself | 2 episodes |
| 2015 | The David Hasselhoff Show | Himself | Host; 15 episodes |
| 2015 | Sharknado 3: Oh Hell No! | Gilbert Grayson Shepard | Television movie |
| 2015–2016 | TripTank | Caller / Dr. Chimp (voice) | 2 episodes |
| 2015–2016 | Hoff the Record | Himself | Main role; 12 episodes |
| 2016 | Last Night a DJ Saved My Life | Ross | Television movie |
| 2016 | Sharknado: The 4th Awakens | Colonel Gilbert Shepard | Television movie |
| 2017 | Nightcap | Himself | Episode: "The Show Must Go On: Part 2" |
| 2019 | SpongeBob SquarePants | Himself | Episode: "SpongeBob's Big Birthday Blowout" |
| 2020 | Close Enough | Himself | Episode: "Clap Like This" |
| 2020–2021 | Dark Nights: Death Metal - Sonic Metalverse | Superman | Voice, motion comic |
| 2021 | The Helgason Show | KGB Agent | Episode: "Borscht with Boris 2" |
| 2021 | Young Sheldon | Himself | Episode: "Cowboy Aerobics and 473 Grease-Free Bolts" |
| 2022 | The Goldbergs | Himself | 2 episodes |
| 2022 | Ze Network | Himself | Main role; 8 episodes |

=== Video games ===
| Year | Title | Voice role | Media |
|---|---|---|---|
| 2008 | Pain | Himself | |
| 2008 | Command & Conquer: Red Alert 3 | Vice President | |
| 2016 | Call of Duty: Infinite Warfare | Himself; N31L | |
| 2025 | SpongeBob SquarePants: Titans of the Tide | Himself | |

=== Other ===
==== Producing credits ====
- 1989: W.B. Blue and Bean
- 1990: DH Live and Forever
- 1991–2001: Baywatch
- 1998: Baywatch: White Thunder at Glacier Bay
- 2003: Baywatch: Hawaiian Wedding
- 2010: The Hasselhoffs
- 2015: Killing Hasselhoff

==== Writing credits ====
- 1995–1997: Baywatch
- 2015: Hoff The Record
- 2019: Up Against the Wall, (Audiobook), publisher: Audible Original,

== Stage work ==
- Jekyll & Hyde (Broadway) – Dr. Henry Jekyll/Edward Hyde (2000-01)
- Chicago (West End) – Billy Flynn (2004)
- Grease – Danny Zuko
- Jesus Christ Superstar – Judas Iscariot
- The Producers (Las Vegas) – Roger De Bris (2007-08)
- The Rocky Horror Show (Los Angeles) – Dr. Frank N. Furter
- Peter Pan (London) – Captain Hook (2010–11)
- Peter Pan (Bristol) – Captain Hook (2011–12)
- Peter Pan (Manchester) – Captain Hook (2012–13)
- Peter Pan (Nottingham) – Captain Hook (2013–14)
- Peter Pan (Southend) – Captain Hook (2014–15)
- Peter Pan (Glasgow) – Captain Hook (2015–16)
- Last Night a DJ Saved My Life (UK Tour) – Ross (2015–16)
- Peter Pan (Cardiff) – Captain Hook (2016–17)
- 9 to 5 (West End) – Franklin Hart (2019–20)
