= David Hasselhoff (album) =

1995 compilation album by David Hasselhoff

Compilation album by David Hasselhoff
- Released: April 11, 1995
- Recorded: 1993–1995
- Label: Critique
- Producer: Mark Holden; Bruce Swedien; René Moore; Jon Lind; Phil Harding; Ian Curnow; Bernie Paul; Claus Mathias; Axel Kroell; Michael Fallon; Peter Fallon; Derek Bramble; Jonathan Wales; Rod Gammons

David Hasselhoff chronology
Du (1994)	David Hasselhoff (1995)	Watch Out for the Bay (1995)

Singles from David Hasselhoff
- 1. "Fallin' in Love" Released: 1995

David Hasselhoff is the self-titled fifth compilation album by American actor and singer David Hasselhoff, released on April 11, 1995, in the United States by Critique Records. The album was Hasselhoff's first release in the US since his second album Lovin' Feelings (1987), and his third overall. The album includes several songs from the albums You Are Everything (1993) and Du (1994), as well as new recording tracks, including the single "Fallin' in Love". The album was an attempt to launch his singing career in the US, however, it was very unsuccessful there, as it didn't enter any Billboard chart.

== Background and release ==
As Hasselhoff's first two albums Night Rocker (1985) and Lovin' Feelings (1987) failed to achieve success in the United States, both albums were very successful in Europe due to the popularity of Knight Rider, series in which Hasselhoff was starring at the time. His following albums weren't released in the US, due to the fact that those albums were produced by German producer Jack White, which helped Hasselhoff to create a European sound that doesn't cross over to the American market. Hasselhoff stated: "The reason I haven't made it in America is because no record label will release this music. I have songs that I know would make it in America if they were released on the right label".

Hasselhoff experienced great success in Europe with the release of "Looking for Freedom" (1988), which became a number-one hit in Austria, Germany and Switzerland, following by his third studio album of the same name (1989), which reached the top-five in those countries and was certified three-times Platinum in Europe. Subsequent albums continued its success in Europe, with the release of the chart-topping albums Crazy for You (1990) and David (1991). However, his following album Everybody Sunshine (1992) would be less successful than his previous efforts, as it became his last album produced by White. Hasselhoff decided to include very different sounds for his next album You Are Everything (1993) and worked with several writers and producers to replace White. Following the promotion of the album, Hasselhoff was scheduled to perform a concert on pay-per-view from Atlantic City. It would be his first live concert in the United States, as an order to launch his singing career there. On the night of the concert, O. J. Simpson was involved in his slow-speed chase in southern California. Due to the live coverage of the chase, viewership of the concert was significantly lower than expected, and the event was ultimately a $1.5 million loss. Hasselhoff joked about the incident that "90 million people watched O. J. and three people watched me, including me and my mom and my dad".

During that time, Hasselhoff planned to release an album in the US during the summer of 1994, which would be under the title Miracle of Love (which was released earlier in the United Kingdom) as a re-release of his seventh album You Are Everything. However, those plans were scrapped. Later in 1995, it was announced that Hasselhoff will release his self-titled album on April 11, 1995, through Critique Records. The album includes several songs from his latest two albums at the time, You Are Everything (1993) and Du (1994), as well as three new recordings: "Do You Believe in Love", "Dark Side of My Heart" and the single "Fallin' in Love".

== Promotion ==
To promote the album in the US, Hasselhoff performed the album's single "Fallin' in Love" for the first time on The Tonight Show with Jay Leno on April 13, 1995. On July 4, 1995, he performed the song again at ABC's Independence Day Concert.

== Singles and commercial performance ==
"Fallin' in Love" was released as the only single from David Hasselhoff. However, it failed to enter any US Billboard single chart. Though Hasselhoff promoted the album as an attempt to launch his singing career in the United States, the album failed to enter any Billboard chart as well.

== Track listing ==
CD
No.	Title	Writer(s)	Length
1.	"Fallin' in Love"	Anne Hamilton; Dan Hamilton	3:50
2.	"Do You Believe in Love"	Chris Eaton	4:56
3.	"Until the Last Teardrop Falls"	Amy Jordan; Gerald O'Brien; Mark Jordan; Stephen Sexton	5:29
4.	"Days of Our Love"	Jordan; Jon Lind; Richard Page	4:04
5.	"Try A Little Tenderness"	Mark Holden; Shaun Imrei	3:48
6.	"Save the World"	Bernie Paul	4:38
7.	"Dark Side of My Heart"	Glen Ballard; Chris Duffy	5:03
8.	"If I Could Only Say Goodbye"	James Berry; Michael Fallon; Peter Fallon	4:10
9.	"Miracle of Love"	Bruce Fischer; Bruce Swedien; James Butler; René Moore	4:45
10.	"Give Me Something Real"	David Hasselhoff; Holden; Axel Kroell	3:44
11.	"The Best Is Yet to Come"	Fischer; Swedien; Moore; Ballard	4:56
12.	"These Lovin' Eyes"	Holden; Ellen Shipley; Ralph Shuckett	4:11
