= Wir zwei allein =

1993 David Hasselhoff song

Single by David Hasselhoff and Gwen

from the album You Are Everything
- B-side: "San Pedro's Children"
- Released: December 1993
- Length: 3:59
- Label: Ariola
- Songwriter(s): Andreas Bärtels; Dietmar Kawohl
- Producer(s): Andreas Bärtels; Dietmar Kawohl; Mats Björklund

David Hasselhoff singles chronology
"If I Could Only Say Goodbye" (1993)	"Wir zwei allein" (1993)	"Pingu Dance" (1993)

Gwen singles chronology
"Bernard Und Bianca" (1991)	"Wir zwei allein" (1993)	"Wie Der Wind" (1994)

"Wir zwei allein" is a song by American singers David Hasselhoff and Gwen. It was released in December 1993 as the third single from Hasselhoff's seventh studio album You Are Everything (1993). The song is the German version of the track "A Star Looks Down Tonight", which appeared on the original release and was included on the CD single. The English version also appeared on Gwen's second album Ganz Schön Frech (1994). The song was a hit in Europe, reaching the top-ten in Austria, Germany and Switzerland.

== Background, release and promotion ==
In 1988, Hasselhoff began working with German producer Jack White. Their output together includes the European hit singles "Looking for Freedom" (a number-one song in Germany), "Crazy for You" (a top-ten hit in Austria) and "Do the Limbo Dance" (a number-one song in Austria). White also produced Hasselhoff's albums Looking for Freedom (1989), Crazy for You (1990), David (1991) and Everybody Sunshine (1992). Following his work with White, Hasselhoff decided to include very different sounds for his next album.

On You Are Everything, Hasselhoff collaborated for the first time with Andreas Bärtels and Dietmar Kawohl on several songs from the album. Hasselhoff, Bärtels, Kawohl and Mark Holden written "A Star Looks Down Tonight", which became a duet with American singer Gwen. Bärtels, Kawohl and Mats Björklund also produced the song. A German version, titled "Wir zwei allein", became Hasselhoff's first German-language song. "Wir zwei allein" was released in December 1993 as the third single from the album, with its English version also appearing on the CD single. Due to its popularity, Gwen also decided to include "A Star Looks Down Tonight" as the closing track from her second studio album, Ganz Schön Frech (1994). A French-language version, titled "Au ciel, une etoile" (featuring French singer Nadège) was also released as a single in late 1994.

Hasselhoff and Gwen performed "Wir zwei allein" live on several German TV shows, including Verstehen sie Spaß. The song went on to became part of the set-list of Hasselhoff's concert tours, starting with David Hasselhoff Live! in 1994. They also performed the English version of the song in the United States, during Hasselhoff's pay-per view special in June 1994, in which they also sang a snippet of its German version as well.

== Chart performance ==
"Wir zwei allein" became the most successful single from You Are Everything. In Austria, it peaked at number four and became Hasselhoff's fourth top-ten single in the country, and his first since "Do the Limbo Dance" (1991), which reached number one there. The song eventually was certified Gold in Austria. In Germany and Switzerland, the song peaked at numbers nine and ten, respectively, becoming Hasselhoff's third-highest charting song in both countries, as well as his third top-ten single in those countries, and his first in five years since "Is Everybody Happy" (1989). With "Wir zwei allein", Gwen also achieved international recognition, becoming her first top-ten single in Austria, Germany and Switzerland. The song also entered the European Hot 100 Singles chart, peaking at number 26.

== Track listing ==
=== 7" single ===
1. "Wir zwei allein" — 3:59
2. "San Pedro's Children" — 4:27

=== CD single ===
1. "Wir zwei allein" — 3:59
2. "San Pedro's Children" — 4:27
3. "A Star Looks Down Tonight" — 3:59

== Charts ==
=== Weekly charts ===
Chart (1993–1994)	Peak position
Austria (Ö3 Austria Top 40)	4
Europe (European Hot 100 Singles)	26
Germany (GfK)	9
Switzerland (Schweizer Hitparade)	10

=== Year-end charts ===
Chart (1994)	Position
Austria (Ö3 Austria Top 40)	16

== Certifications and sales ==
Region	Certification	Certified units/sales
Austria (IFPI Austria)	Gold	25,000^{*}
^{*} Sales figures based on certification alone.
