= Du (album) =

- German cover art

Studio album by David Hasselhoff
- Released: October 17, 1994
- Label: Ariola; BMG
- Producer: Mark Holden; Dietmar Kawohl; Michael Sembello; Neumi Neumann; Norbert Endlich; Bernie Paul; Claus Mathias; Phil Harding; Ian Curnow; Jon Lind

David Hasselhoff chronology
Crazy for You (1994)	Du (1994)	David Hasselhoff (1995)

David Hasselhoff studio album chronology
You Are Everything (1993)	Du (1994)	Hooked on a Feeling (1997)

Singles from Du
- 1. "Summer of Love" Released: 1994; 2. "Du" Released: 1994

Du is the eighth studio album by American actor and singer David Hasselhoff, released on October 17, 1994 by Ariola Records. On the album, Hasselhoff worked again with Mark Holden, Dietmar Kawohl, Andreas Bärtels and Michael Sembello, the only holdovers from his previous album You Are Everything (1993), as well as new writers and producers. On the album, Hasselhoff also collaborated in the songwriting on several tracks. The album was less successful than his previous releases, reaching the top-thirty in Austria, and the top-fifty in Germany and Switzerland.

== Background and release ==
Du was the second album in which Hasselhoff sang in German, with the first being on his previous album, You Are Everything (1993), on the track "Wir zwei allein". The title track also contains an English version, titled "You", which eventually appeared as the closing track on the album. The tracks "Summer of Love", "Lifeline" and "Days of Our Love" were songs from the American TV series, Baywatch, in which Hasselhoff starred at the time, with the latter song appearing on the season 6 episode "Seize the Day". Another track from the album, "These Lovin' Eyes" also appeared on the Baywatch season 8 episode "White Thunder At Glacier Bay". The song "Save the World" featured a guest appearance from her daughter Taylor Ann Hasselhoff, which was only four years old at the time of its release. Hasselhoff co-wrote the songs "Summer of Love", "Lifeline", "Live Until I Die" and "Rockin' the Night Away", marking the third time Hasselhoff was credited as a songwriter, following Lovin' Feelings (1987) and You Are Everything (1993).

Released on October 17, 1994, Du became Hasselhoff's final studio album under the Ariola/BMG Records label, which distributed all of his material since 1989, as he signed with Polydor Records three years later for his next studio album, Hooked on a Feeling (1997).

== Promotion ==
Hasselhoff made a short promotional tour for the album in Germany, including The Surprise Show, where he performed the album's title track.

== Singles ==
"Summer of Love" was released as the lead single from Du. The album's title track was later released as the second single. However, both singles failed to chart.

== Commercial performance ==
Du met with moderate success on the charts. In Austria, the album peaked at number 21, spending only seven weeks on the chart. In Switzerland, the album peaked at number 41, spending only six weeks on the chart. In Germany, the album peaked at number 43, spending nine weeks on the German charts.

Du was Hasselhoff's first studio album not to receive any certification in Europe, becoming his less successful album until that point.

== Track listing ==
CD
No.	Title	Writer(s)	Length
1.	"Du"	Michael Kunze; Peter Orloff	5:02
2.	"What A Feeling"	Bernie Paul	3:56
3.	"Gimme Your Love"	Paul	4:00
4.	"Save the World"	Paul	4:38
5.	"Turn Me Inside Out"	Bobby Burrows; Neumi Neumann; Norbert Endlich	2:55
6.	"Summer of Love"	David Hasselhoff; Mark Holden; Phil Harding; Ian Curnow	3:59
7.	"These Lovin' Eyes"	Holden; Ellen Shipley; Ralph Shuckett	4:11
8.	"Days of Our Love"	Jon Lind; Mark Jordan; Richard Page	4:04
9.	"Try A Little Tenderness"	Holden; Shaun Imrei	3:48
10.	"Lifeline"	Hasselhoff; Holden; Bruce Fischer; Jeff Paris	4:24
11.	"Live Until I Die"	Hasselhoff; Holden; Harding; Curnow	4:56
12.	"Rockin' The Night Away"	Hasselhoff; Holden; Andreas Bärtels; Dietmar Kawohl; H.D. Kaye	3:28
13.	"Time For Lovin'"	Holden; Neumann; Endlich	3:26
14.	"You"	Kunze; Orloff	5:02

== Charts ==
Chart (1994–95)	Peak position
Austrian Albums (Ö3 Austria)	21
European Albums (Music & Media)	93
German Albums (Offizielle Top 100)	43
Swiss Albums (Schweizer Hitparade)	41
