= Hooked on a Feeling (David Hasselhoff album) =

Studio album by David Hasselhoff
- Released: November 11, 1997
- Label: Polydor
- Producer: Mark Holden; Wade Hubbard; Gary St. Clair; Steve McVine; John Ballard; Stone Stream; Axel Breitung; Kai Mathiessen

David Hasselhoff chronology
Looking for... the Best (1995)	Hooked on a Feeling (1997)	Watch Out for Hasselhoff (1999)

David Hasselhoff studio album chronology
Du (1994)	Hooked on a Feeling (1997)	David Hasselhoff Sings America (2004)

Singles from Hooked on a Feeling
- 1. "Hooked on a Feeling" Released: 1997; 2. "Hold on My Love" Released: 1997; 3. "More Than Words Can Say" Released: 1997

Hooked on a Feeling is the ninth studio album by American actor and singer David Hasselhoff, released on November 11, 1997, by Polydor Records. On the album, Hasselhoff collaborated again with Mark Holden, who worked with him since 1993, as well as new writers and producers, including Wade Hubbard, Gary St. Clair and John Ballard. On the album, Hasselhoff also collaborated in the songwriting on several tracks, and featured collaborations with Regine Velasquez, Marilyn Martin and Gwen. The album became Hasselhoff's lowest-selling album to that point in his career, failing to chart in Germany, and reaching the top fifty in Austria and Switzerland.

== Background and release ==
Following the release of Du (1994) and his departure from Ariola Records and BMG Music, Hasselhoff signed with Polydor Records and recorded a new album. The album includes collaborations with several recording artists, including Filipino singer Regine Velasquez, American singer Marilyn Martin and German singer Gwen, who previously appeared on the track "Wir zwei allein" from the album You Are Everything (1993).

Hooked on a Feeling was released on November 11, 1997, by Polydor, and became his only album released with the label before they dropped him. He would not release another studio album until 2004, with David Hasselhoff Sings America. The album was re-released that year under the title More Than Words Can Say only in Indonesia, with the tracks in a different order, and excluding the main version of "Hooked on a Feeling" (as only the Radio Mix was included there).

== Promotion ==
Hasselhoff embarked on a short promotional tour for the album in Europe. He performed "Hooked on a Feeling" at Hitparade (Germany) on November 22, 1997, and at Takito (Switzerland) on December 4, 1997.

== Singles ==
The album's title track was released as the lead single, peaking at number 36 in Austria. The next two singles, "Hold on My Love" and "More Than Words Can Say" (featuring Regine Velasquez), failed to chart.

== Commercial performance ==
Hooked on a Feeling was commercially unsuccessful in comparison with his previous releases, as the album became Hasselhoff's first studio album that failed to chart in Germany. In Austria, the album debuted at its peak of number 49 on the Austrian Albums chart, spending only one week before leaving the chart, becoming Hasselhoff's least successful album and his lowest-selling album to that point in Austria. In Switzerland, the album performed slightly better, debuting at its peak of number 41 (which also matched the same peak of his previous album, Du), and spending four weeks on the chart.

Hooked on a Feeling was certified Gold in Czech Republic.

== Track listing ==
CD
No.	Title	Writer(s)	Length
1.	"Hooked on a Feeling"	Mark James	3:56
2.	"More Than Words Can Say" (featuring Regine Velasquez)	David Hasselhoff; Wade Hubbard; Glen Morrow	4:11
3.	"I Live for Love" (featuring Marilyn Martin)	Gatto Panceri; Valerio Zelli	4:26
4.	"Never My Love"	Donald Adreissi; Ricard Adreissi	3:36
5.	"Santa Monica Nights"	Hasselhoff; Holden; Hubbard	2:54
6.	"Hold on My Love"	John O'Flynn; Steve McVine	3:35
7.	"Slow Night in the City"	John Ballard; Stone Stream	3:25
8.	"Then You Can Tell Me Goodbye"	John D. Loudermilk	3:16
9.	"Queen Of Rain"	Axel Breitung	3:44
10.	"I'm Your Lover"	Hasselhoff; Holden; Hubbard	3:44
11.	"Beach Baby"	Gillian Shakespeare; John Carter	3:56
12.	"If I Had One Wish" (featuring Gwen)	Hasselhoff; Hubbard	4:05
13.	"Hooked on a Feeling" (Radio Mix)	James	3:35

== Charts ==
Chart (1997–98)	Peak position
Austrian Albums (Ö3 Austria)	49
Czech Albums (ČNS IFPI)	11
Swiss Albums (Schweizer Hitparade)	41
