= Knight Lover =

Compilation album by David Hasselhoff
- Released: July 1989
- Recorded: 1984–1987
- Genre: Rock, pop
- Label: CBS Records

David Hasselhoff chronology
Looking for Freedom (1989)	Knight Lover (1989)	Crazy for You (1990)

Knight Lover (subtitled 17 Greatest Hits) is a compilation album by the American actor David Hasselhoff. It was released in July 1989. The album contains tracks from Hasselhoff's first two studio albums, Night Rocker and Lovin' Feelings, both released on CBS Records.

== Track listing ==
Compact Disc (465286)
No.	Title	Writer(s)	Length
1.	"Always on My Mind"	Wayne Carson, Johnny Christopher, Mark James	3:06
2.	"She Cried"	Greg Richards, Ted Daryll	3:34
3.	"Crazy on a Saturday Night"	Mark Keller, Wendy Webb	3:38
4.	"Jean"	Rod McKuen	2:52
5.	"No Way to Be in Love" (with Catherine Hickland)	Walsh, Glen Ballard	4:12
6.	"Any Kind of Love at All"	Ray Dahrouge	4:03
7.	"True Love Always"	Norman Petty, Buddy Holly	2:48
8.	"Stand By Me"	Ben E. King, Jerry Leiber and Mike Stoller	3:58
9.	"Do You Love Me"	Berry Gordy	3:57
10.	"How Deep Is Your Love"	Barry Gibb, Robin Gibb, Maurice Gibb	3:08
11.	"Life Is Mostly Beautiful With You"	T. Christoper, D. James	2:50
12.	"All the Right Moves"	Martin Briley	3:32
13.	"Go Away Little Girl"	Gerry Goffin, Carole King	2:10
14.	"Night Rocker"	Peter Myers	3:38
15.	"Lovin' Arms"	Tom Jans	2:56
16.	"Let It Be Me" (with Catherine Hickland)	Gilbert Bécaud, Manny Curtis, Pierre Delanoë	2:17
17.	"You've Lost That Lovin' Feelin'"	Phil Spector, Barry Mann, Cynthia Weil	3:20

== Charts ==
Chart (1989)	Peak position
European Albums (Music & Media)	90
German Albums (Offizielle Top 100)	36
Swiss Albums (Schweizer Hitparade)	17
