= You Are Everything (disambiguation) =

"You Are Everything" is a 1971 song by The Stylistics.

You Are Everything may also refer to:

- You Are Everything (album), a 1993 album by David Hasselhoff
- "You Are Everything" (Dru Hill song), a 1999 song by Dru Hill
- "You Are Everything" (Matthew West song), a 2007 song by Matthew West

== See also ==
- You're Everything (disambiguation)
