= Du (Peter Maffay song) =

1970 single by Peter Maffay

Single by Peter Maffay

from the album Für das Mädchen, das ich liebe
- Language: German
- B-side: "Jeder Junge braucht ein Mädchen"
- Released: 15 January 1970
- Recorded: 1969
- Genre: Pop rock
- Length: 5:00
- Label: Telefunken
- Songwriters: Michael Kunze; Peter Orloff
- Producers: Michael Kunze; Peter Orloff

Peter Maffay singles chronology
| "Du" (1970) | "Du bist anders" (1970) |

Music video
- "Du" on YouTube

"Du" ("You") is a song by German musician Peter Maffay from his 1970 album Für das Mädchen, das ich liebe. It was his debut single as a solo artist.

The song was covered in 1986 by Dutch singer Andre Hazes as the title-track for his album Jij Bent Alles. David Hasselhoff also covered the song in 1994, but failed to eclipse the success of both Maffay's (Germany #43, Switzerland #41) and his own hit "Looking for Freedom" (#1 in Germany and Switzerland). Both songs are on the album Looking for... the Best.

A video clip from David Hasselhoff's cover was shown for comedic effect in the 2004 comedy, Eurotrip.

== Track listing ==
- German 7" single
1. "Du" – 5:00
2. "Jeder Junge braucht ein Mädchen" – 2:35

== Charts ==
| Chart (1970-71) | Peak position |
|---|---|
| Austria (Ö3 Austria Top 40) | 8 |
| Belgium (Ultratop 50 Flanders) | 1 |
| Belgium (Ultratop 50 Wallonia) | 30 |
| Netherlands (Single Top 100) | 1 |
| Switzerland (Schweizer Hitparade) | 2 |
| West Germany (GfK) | 1 |

== See also ==
- List of number-one hits of 1970 (Germany)
- List of number one hits in Belgium (1971)
