= Jump in My Car =

1975 single by Ted Mulry Gang

"Jump in My Car" is a song originally recorded by Australian rock band Ted Mulry Gang in 1975. The song was written by Australian singer Ted Mulry and guitarist Les Hall, and was the first hit for the band in Australia. "Jump in My Car" was number one in Australia in 1976 for six weeks.

== Charts ==
=== Weekly charts ===
| Chart (1976) | Peak position |
|---|---|
| Australia (Kent Music Report) | 1 |

=== Year-end charts ===
| Chart (1975) | Position |
|---|---|
| Australia (Kent Music Report) | 76 |
| Chart (1976) | Position |
| Australia (Kent Music Report) | 6 |

== David Hasselhoff version ==
"Jump in My Car"

Single by David Hasselhoff
- Released: 26 June 2006
- Length: 3:01
- Label: Skintight
- Songwriters: Ted Mulry, Les Hall
- Producer: Harry Vanda

David Hasselhoff singles chronology
| "Do the Limbo Dance" (2005) | "Jump in My Car" (2006) | "It's a Real Good Feeling" (2011) |

American actor David Hasselhoff recorded a cover of "Jump in My Car" that was released in Australia on 26 June 2006 ahead of his first tour there. The song was later released in the UK and debuted at number three on the UK Singles Chart in October 2006. It received publicity from the "Get Hasselhoff to Number 1" campaign, which originally campaigned to get "Looking for Freedom" released but later switched its attentions to "Jump in My Car". The song also received backing from BBC Radio 1 DJ Scott Mills and The Sun newspaper.

The music video for the song was filmed in Glebe in Sydney, Australia and was ranked number 2 in MAX music's World's Worst Ever Video countdown in 2008. According to Hasselhoff, the video was intended as a joke, a parody of himself. The 1983 Pontiac Trans Am in the video has been modified to look like KITT from Knight Rider. Most notably, due to the video being filmed in Australia, the car was right hand drive.

Hasselhoff sang this song on an episode of the TV show America's Got Talent. His cover of the song was a running gag on Quizmania.

In 2019, Hasselhoff re-recorded the song for his fourteenth studio album Open Your Eyes (2019), with American rock musician Todd Rundgren being a featured artist on the song.

=== Track listing ===
1. "Jump in My Car" (Ted Mulry) 2:58
2. "Jump in My Car" (EMC remix) (Ted Mulry) 3:17
3. "Jump in My Car" (Hoff's housed up mix) (Ted Mulry) 5:02
4. "Jump in My Car" (video) 3:01

=== Charts ===
==== Weekly charts ====
| Chart (2006) | Peak position |
|---|---|
| Australia (ARIA) | 50 |
| Austria (Ö3 Austria Top 40) | 61 |
| Europe (Eurochart Hot 100) | 16 |
| Ireland (IRMA) | 24 |
| Scottish Singles Sales (Official Charts) | 2 |
| UK Singles (Official Charts) | 3 |

==== Year-end charts ====
| Chart (2006) | Position |
|---|---|
| UK Singles (OCC) | 155 |

== Other versions ==
Guitarist Chris Spedding released the song as a 45 (RAK 228) in January 1976. The song was also included on his self-titled album released the following April.
