= List of number one hits in Belgium (1971) =

This is a list of the singles that topped the Ultratop 50 in the Flanders region of Belgium in 1971.

Issue date	Song	Artist
2 January	"Rozen voor Sandra"	Jimmy Frey
9 January	"Rozen voor Sandra"	Jimmy Frey
16 January	"My Sweet Lord"	George Harrison
23 January	"My Sweet Lord"	George Harrison
30 January	"My Sweet Lord"	George Harrison
6 February	"My Sweet Lord"	George Harrison
13 February	"Rose Garden"	Lynn Anderson
20 February	"Rose Garden"	Lynn Anderson
27 February	"Rose Garden"	Lynn Anderson
6 March	"Rose Garden"	Lynn Anderson
13 March	"Chirpy Chirpy Cheep Cheep"	Middle of the Road
20 March	"Chirpy Chirpy Cheep Cheep"	Middle of the Road
27 March	"Chirpy Chirpy Cheep Cheep"	Middle of the Road
3 April	"Du"	Peter Maffay
10 April	"Du"	Peter Maffay
17 April	"Du"	Peter Maffay
24 April	"Du"	Peter Maffay
1 May	"Du"	Peter Maffay
8 May	"Funny, Funny"	The Sweet
15 May	"Funny, Funny"	The Sweet
22 May	"Funny, Funny"	The Sweet
29 May	"Zonneschijn"	Will Tura
5 June	"Zonneschijn"	Will Tura
12 June	"Rosetta"	Georgie Fame & Alan Price
19 June	"Rosetta"	Georgie Fame & Alan Price
26 June	"Ein Madchen fur immer"	Peter Orloff
3 July	"Put Your Hand In the Hand"	Ocean
10 July	"Pour un flirt"	Michel Delpech
17 July	"Pour un flirt"	Michel Delpech
24 July	"Pour un flirt"	Michel Delpech
31 July	"Pour un flirt"	Michel Delpech
7 August	"Pour un flirt"	Michel Delpech
14 August	"Pour un flirt"	Michel Delpech
21 August	"Co-Co"	The Sweet
28 August	"Borriquito"	Peret
4 September	"Borriquito"	Peret
11 September	"Borriquito"	Peret
18 September	"Borriquito"	Peret
25 September	"Borriquito"	Peret
2 October	"Borriquito"	Peret
9 October	"Mamy Blue"	Pop Tops
16 October	"Mamy Blue"	Pop Tops
23 October	"Mamy Blue"	Pop Tops
30 October	"Mamy Blue"	Pop Tops
6 November	"Soley Soley"	Middle of the Road
13 November	"Soley Soley"	Middle of the Road
20 November	"Soley Soley"	Middle of the Road
27 November	"Soley Soley"	Middle of the Road
4 December	"Soley Soley"	Middle of the Road
11 December	"The Witch Queen of New Orleans"	Redbone
18 December	"The Witch Queen of New Orleans"	Redbone
25 December	"The Witch Queen of New Orleans"	Redbone

== 1971 Year-End Chart ==
=== Singles ===
Pos.	Title	Artist	Peak
1	"Du"	Peter Maffay	1
2	"Pour un flirt"	Michel Depech	1
3	"Soley Soley"	Middle of the Road	1
4	"Aan mijn darling"	Will Tura	2
5	"Borriquito"	Peret	1
6	"Mamy Blue"	Pop Tops	1
7	"Zonneschijn"	Will Tura	1
8	"Manuela"	Jacques Herb & De Riwi's	3
9	"Chirpy Chirpy Cheep Cheep"	Middle of the Road	1
10	"Co-Co"	The Sweet	1

== See also ==
- 1971 in music
