= List of number-one hits of 1970 (Germany) =

This is a list of the German Media Control Top100 Singles Chart number-ones of 1970.

| Issue date | Song | Artist |
|---|---|---|
| 3 January | "Dein schönstes Geschenk" | Roy Black |
| 10 January | "Dein schönstes Geschenk" | Roy Black |
| 17 January | "Dein schönstes Geschenk" | Roy Black |
| 24 January | "Dein schönstes Geschenk" | Roy Black |
| 31 January | "Dein schönstes Geschenk" | Roy Black |
| 7 February | "Dein schönstes Geschenk" | Roy Black |
| 14 February | "Dein schönstes Geschenk" | Roy Black |
| 21 February | "Dein schönstes Geschenk" | Roy Black |
| 28 February | "Dein schönstes Geschenk" | Roy Black |
| 7 March | "Whole Lotta Love" | Led Zeppelin |
| 14 March | "Whole Lotta Love" | Led Zeppelin |
| 21 March | "Whole Lotta Love" | Led Zeppelin |
| 28 March | "Whole Lotta Love" | Led Zeppelin |
| 4 April | "Whole Lotta Love" | Led Zeppelin |
| 11 April | "Whole Lotta Love" | Led Zeppelin |
| 18 April | "Whole Lotta Love" | Led Zeppelin |
| 25 April | "Mademoiselle Ninette" | The Soulful Dynamics |
| 2 May | "Mademoiselle Ninette" | The Soulful Dynamics |
| 9 May | "Mademoiselle Ninette" | The Soulful Dynamics |
| 16 May | "House of the Rising Sun" | Frijid Pink |
| 23 May | "House of the Rising Sun" | Frijid Pink |
| 30 May | "Du" | Peter Maffay |
| 6 June | "Du" | Peter Maffay |
| 13 June | "Spirit in the Sky" | Norman Greenbaum |
| 20 June | "Spirit in the Sky" | Norman Greenbaum |
| 27 June | "El Condor Pasa (If I Could)" | Simon and Garfunkel |
| 4 July | "El Condor Pasa (If I Could)" | Simon and Garfunkel |
| 11 July | "El Condor Pasa (If I Could)" | Simon and Garfunkel |
| 18 July | "El Condor Pasa (If I Could)" | Simon and Garfunkel |
| 25 July | "El Condor Pasa (If I Could)" | Simon and Garfunkel |
| 1 August | "El Condor Pasa (If I Could)" | Simon and Garfunkel |
| 8 August | "El Condor Pasa (If I Could)" | Simon and Garfunkel |
| 15 August | "In the Summertime" | Mungo Jerry |
| 22 August | "In the Summertime" | Mungo Jerry |
| 29 August | "In the Summertime" | Mungo Jerry |
| 5 September | "In the Summertime" | Mungo Jerry |
| 12 September | "In the Summertime" | Mungo Jerry |
| 19 September | "In the Summertime" | Mungo Jerry |
| 26 September | "In the Summertime" | Mungo Jerry |
| 3 October | "A Song of Joy" | Miguel Ríos |
| 10 October | "A Song of Joy" | Miguel Ríos |
| 17 October | "A Song of Joy" | Miguel Ríos |
| 24 October | "A Song of Joy" | Miguel Ríos |
| 31 October | "A Song of Joy" | Miguel Ríos |
| 7 November | "A Song of Joy" | Miguel Ríos |
| 14 November | "A Song of Joy" | Miguel Ríos |
| 21 November | "A Song of Joy" | Miguel Ríos |
| 28 November | "A Song of Joy" | Miguel Ríos |
| 5 December | "A Song of Joy" | Miguel Ríos |
| 12 December | "A Song of Joy" | Miguel Ríos |
| 19 December | "Paranoid" | Black Sabbath |
| 26 December | "Paranoid" | Black Sabbath |

== See also ==
- List of number-one hits (Germany)
