= You're Everything (disambiguation) =

You're Everything may refer to:

- "You're Everything", a single by Bun B
- You're Everything (album), an album by Berlin Jazz Orchestra
- "You're Everything", a song by Return to Forever from the album Light as a Feather

== See also ==
- You Are Everything (disambiguation)
- Your Everything, a single by Keith Urban
