= The Night Before Christmas (album) =

Studio album by David Hasselhoff
- Released: 8 November 2004
- Recorded: 2004
- Genre: Christmas
- Length: 42:20
- Labels: Edel; Shock

David Hasselhoff chronology
Sings America (2004)	The Night Before Christmas (2004)	Das Allerbeste (2008)

The Night Before Christmas is the eleventh studio album and first Christmas album by American actor and singer David Hasselhoff. It was released on November 8, 2004, by Edel Records in Europe. Shock Records released the album a year later in Australia.

== Reception ==
The album received generally negative reviews.

Idolator said: "Who wouldn’t want to be serenaded by The Hoff at Christmas? No? David dusts off all the classics like "Deck The Halls" and "Silent Night," and crosses cultural borders by assaulting eardrums in languages other than English, via German and Spanish contributions to the Yuletide soundtrack from Hell."

In 2013, New York Post ranked the album as number 1 worst celebrity Christmas album, saying the album spread "Christmas fear instead of cheer".

In 2015 CBC Music listed the album as one of the 15 worst Christmas albums of all time.

In 2015, Clint Davis from NBC listed the album as one of the 8 most bizarre Christmas albums.

In 2016, Matthew Dunn from news.com.au said "nothing says scraping the bottom of the barrel quite like David Hasselhoff’s The Night Before Christmas" in an explanation of why he dislikes Christmas.

== Track listing ==
1. "'Twas the Night Before Christmas" – 6:40
2. "White Christmas" – 3:05
3. "Joy to the World" – 2:12
4. "Deck the Halls" – 1:43
5. "Silent Night" – 3:20
6. "God Rest Ye Merry Gentleman" – 2:29
7. "Hark the Herald Angels" – 2:15
8. "The Christmas Song" – 3:04
9. "O Holy Night" – 2:13
10. "Jingle Bells" – 2:12
11. "Feliz Navidad" – 3:17
12. "We Wish You a Merry Christmas" – 2:28
13. "Please Come Home For Christmas" (with Gwen) – 4:05
14. "Stille Nacht" – 3:18

== Charts ==
Chart (2005)	Peak position
Australian Albums (ARIA Charts)	74

== Release history ==
Region	Date	Format	Label	Catalogue
Europe	8 November 2004	CD; digital download	Edel Records	0158742ERE
Australia	9 December 2005	CD; digital download	Shock Records	THEHOFFCD1
