= Sings America =

Studio album by David Hasselhoff
- Released: February 2, 2004
- Genre: Easy Listening
- Length: 62:40
- Label: Edel (Germany)
- Producer: Chris Walden; Wade Hubbard

David Hasselhoff chronology
Greatest Hits (2004)	Sings America (2004)	The Night Before Christmas (2004)

Sings America is the tenth studio album by American actor and singer David Hasselhoff. It was released on February 2, 2004, by Edel Records. It became his first studio project in seven years since Hooked on a Feeling (1997).

The album contains covers of songs originally made famous by artists such as Elvis Presley, The Beach Boys, Glen Campbell, Burt Bacharach and Madonna. The German release contains a bonus track, "More Than Words Can Say", which is the only original Hasselhoff composition on the album (written in conjunction with Wade Hubbard and Glenn Morrow).

== Track listing ==
1. "City of New Orleans" – 3:34 (Steve Goodman)
2. "Rhinestone Cowboy" – 3:33 (Larry Weiss)
3. "You've Lost That Loving Feeling" (duet with Marilyn Martin) – 4:40 (Cynthia Weil, Barry Mann and Phil Spector)
4. "Forever in Blue Jeans" – 3:30 (Neil Diamond and Richard Bennett)
5. "Blue Bayou" – 2:35 (Roy Orbison and Joe Melson)
6. "California Girls" – 2:51 (Brian Wilson)
7. "Raindrops Keep Falling On My Head" 2:41 (Burt Bacharach and Hal David)
8. "California Dreaming" – 2:47 (John Phillips and Michelle Gilliam)
9. "These Boots Are Made For Walking" – 2:52 (Lee Hazlewood)
10. "La Isla Bonita" (Pat Leonard, Madonna and Bruce Gaitsch)
11. "Country Roads" – 3:21 (Bill Danoff, John Denver and Taffy Nivert)
12. "Love Me Tender" – 3:05 (Vera Matson and Elvis Presley)
13. "New York, New York" – 3:30 (John Kander and Fred Ebb)
14. "Amazing Grace" – 2:58 (Trad.)
15. "More Than Words Can Say" (bonus track) – 4:11 (David Hasselhoff, Wade Hubbard, Glenn Morrow)

== Charts ==
Chart (2004)	Peak position
Austrian Albums (Ö3 Austria)	11
German Albums (Offizielle Top 100)	27
