= Do the Limbo Dance =

1991 David Hasselhoff song

"Do The Limbo Dance"

Single by David Hasselhoff

from the album David
- Released: July 1991
- Length: 3:47
- Label: White
- Songwriter(s): Jack White; Charles Blackwell
- Producer(s): Jack White

David Hasselhoff singles chronology
"Let's Dance Tonight" (1991)	"Do The Limbo Dance" (1991)	"Gipsy Girl" (1991)

"Do The Limbo Dance" is a song by American actor and singer David Hasselhoff. It was released in July 1991, it served as the lead single from Hasselhoff's fifth studio album David (1991). The song was produced by Jack White, and written by him and Charles Blackwell. The song was a huge hit in Austria, where it reached number one.

== Release and promotion ==
"Do The Limbo Dance" was released in July 1990, and Hasselhoff performed the song live on several TV shows across Europe, including Kultnacht in Germany and Le monde est la vous in France. The song went on to become part of the set-list of Hasselhoff's concert tours, starting with the Dreams Come True Tour in November 1991.

== Chart performance ==
In Austria, "Do The Limbo Dance" debuted at number 25, and reached number one on its seventh week, becoming Hasselhoff's second chart-topper single in the country, following "Looking for Freedom" (1988), and remained for a total of 28 weeks, and later certified Gold in the country. The song also did well in Germany, where it peaked at number 12 and remained for 22 weeks. In Switzerland, the song peaked at number 19 and remained for eight weeks. It also reached number 35 on the European Hot 100 Singles.

== Track listing ==
1. "Do The Limbo Dance" (Long Version) — 5:20
2. "Do The Limbo Dance" (Radio Version) — 3:55
3. "Do The Limbo Dance" (Instrumental) — 3:55

== Charts and sales ==
=== Weekly charts ===
Chart (1991–1992)	Peak position
Austria (Ö3 Austria Top 40)	1
Europe (European Hot 100 Singles)	35
Germany (GfK)	12
Switzerland (Schweizer Hitparade)	19

=== Certifications and sales ===
Region	Certification	Certified units/sales
Austria (IFPI Austria)	Gold	25,000^{*}
^{*} Sales figures based on certification alone.

=== Year-end charts ===
Chart (1991)	Position
Austria (Ö3 Austria Top 40)	5
Germany (Official German Charts)	53

=== Decade-end charts ===
Chart (1990–1999)	Position
Austria (Ö3 Austria Top 40)	8
