= Crazy for You (David Hasselhoff song) =

1990 David Hasselhoff song

Single by David Hasselhoff

from the album Crazy for You
- Released: August 1990
- Length: 4:36
- Label: White
- Songwriter(s): Jack White; Charles Blackwell
- Producer(s): Jack White

David Hasselhoff singles chronology
"Je T'Aime Means I Love You" (1990)	"Crazy for You" (1990)	"Freedom for the World" (1990)

"Crazy for You" is a song by American actor and singer David Hasselhoff. It was released in August 1990 as the lead single from Hasselhoff's fourth studio album of the same name (1990). The song was produced by Jack White, and written by him and Charles Blackwell. The song was a hit in Austria, peaking at number four.

== Background, release and promotion ==
Jack White began working with Hasselhoff in 1988 on the song "Looking for Freedom", which became Hasselhoff's biggest hit, topping the charts in Austria, Germany and Switzerland. Followed by his third studio album of the same name and its follow-up single "Is Everybody Happy" being also successful across Europe. Following its accompanying tour, the Freedom Tour, Hasselhoff and White began working on a new album.

"Crazy for You" was released in August 1990, and Hasselhoff made its debut live performance of the song on September 15, 1990, on the German TV show Wetten, dass..?. The song went on to became part of the set-list of Hasselhoff's concert tours, starting with the Dreams Come True Tour in November 1991.

== Chart performance ==
In Austria, the song debuted at number 12, and reached its peak of number four on its sixth week, spending four non-consecutive weeks at that position, remaining on the chart for a total of 19 weeks. In Germany, it peaked at number 18 and remained for 21 weeks on the chart. In Switzerland, it peaked at number 21 and remained for eight weeks on the chart. It also reached number 51 on the European Hot 100 Singles.

== Track listings ==
7" single

1. "Crazy For You" (Radio Edit) — 3:33
2. "Crazy For You" (Album Version) — 4:37

12" single

1. "Crazy For You" (Long Version) — 6:07
2. "Crazy For You" (Radio Edit) — 3:30
3. "Crazy For You" (Album Version) — 4:37
4. "Crazy For You" (Instrumental) — 4:34

== Charts ==
Chart (1990–1991)	Peak position
Austria (Ö3 Austria Top 40)	4
Europe (European Hot 100 Singles)	51
Germany (GfK)	18
Switzerland (Schweizer Hitparade)	21
