= Catherine Hickland =

American actress (born 1956)

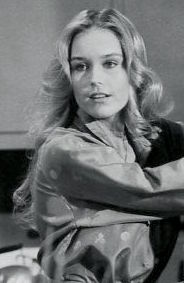
- Hickland in Eight is Enough, 1979
- Born: February 11, 1956 (age 70); Fort Lauderdale, Florida, U.S.
- Occupations: Actress; singer; author; businessperson
- Years active: 1978–present
- Spouses: Richard Knowlton (m. 1981; div. 1982); David Hasselhoff (m. 1984; div. 1989); Michael E. Knight (m. 1992; div. 2006); Todd Fisher (m. 2012)

Catherine Hickland (born February 11, 1956) is an American film, stage, and television actress, as well as a singer, author and cosmetics-company CEO and hypnotist. She began her career in television in 1978, appearing in guest roles on several series before being cast in a recurring role on Texas from 1980 to 1981. She also had supporting roles in the comedy film The Last Married Couple in America (1980), and the horror films Ghost Town (1988) and Witchery (1988).

In 1995, Hickland appeared as Fantine in a Broadway production of Les Misérables. From 1998 to 2008, she appeared in the American soap opera One Life to Live, playing the character of Lindsay Rappaport, reprising the role again in 2009 and 2012. Hickland is also the CEO of Cat Cosmetics, her own cosmetics line that she started in 2001.

== Early life ==
Hickland was born and raised in Fort Lauderdale, Florida, to Arthur and Mary Hickland; her father was a dentist, and her mother a dental ceramist. She has one brother and one sister. Hickland graduated from Fort Lauderdale High School in 1974. She enrolled at Florida Atlantic University, but dropped out after two years to take a job as a flight attendant for National Airlines. After six months, she made a commercial for the airline and left for Los Angeles to study acting.

== Career ==
Hickland played in a number of daytime dramas. Her first major role was on Texas as Dr. Courtney Marshall from 1980 to 1981, followed by the role of Julie Clegg McCandless on Capitol from 1984 to 1987, and the dual role of Jenny Diamond from 1985 to 1986.

While engaged to her future husband David Hasselhoff, she played a role in his series Knight Rider as Stephanie "Stevie" Mason, who, in the story, was engaged to Michael Knight (Hasselhoff's character). She appeared in three episodes: "White Bird" (March 4, 1983), "Let It Be Me" (May 13, 1984), and "The Scent of Roses" (January 3, 1986). In 1985, Hickland appeared in 15 episodes of the game show "Body Language. She also appears on the debut David Hasselhoff record Night Rocker, singing on "Our First Night Together" and "Let It Be Me".

In 1987, she filled in for Katherine Kelly Lang as Brooke Logan on the serial The Bold and the Beautiful, while Lang was sick. She also played Tess Wilder on Loving (1993–1995) and The City (1995–1997). From 1998 to 2009, Hickland portrayed Lindsay Rappaport on One Life to Live, reprising her role towards the end of the show's run in 2012.

As a guest star, Hickland appeared in numerous television series, including CHiPs (1983), Airwolf (1985), and Law & Order and Law & Order: Criminal Intent (2001–2005).

Hickland also appeared on Broadway in the musical Les Misérables as Fantine in 1995. Also she performed live, singing with the National Symphony de Lyon in Lyon, France, in 1995. In 2001, she released a music CD, Sincerely Broadway, and that same year started a cosmetics line, Cat Cosmetics, and is its CEO. She has also written a column on cosmetics and skin care for Soap Opera Digest.

Hickland's first book, The 30 Day Heartbreak Cure - A Guide to Getting Over Him and Back Out There One Month From Today was published in December 2008 by Simon & Schuster. Her second book, released in December 2014, is titled Cat & Fern's Excellent God Adventure: Daily Inspirations for 365 Days of Heaven On Earth, written with Fern Underwood and Lindsay Harrison.

Since 2008, Hickland has been operating as a hypnotist.

== Personal life ==
Hickland's first marriage was to Richard Ernest Knowlton on October 10, 1981, in Fort Lauderdale, Florida. They divorced on March 23, 1982. From March 24, 1984, to March 1, 1989, she was married to David Hasselhoff. On June 27, 1992, Hickland married All My Children star Michael E. Knight, with whom she lived in Manhattan until their divorce in 2006. After the marriage ended, Hickland married producer Todd Fisher on December 22, 2012. The couple have a home in Las Vegas and a ranch in California.

Hickland identifies as a Christian. In a 1999 Parade magazine article, she admitted to battling anorexia.

== Filmography ==
=== Film ===
| Year | Title | Role | Notes |
|---|---|---|---|
| 1980 | The Last Married Couple in America | Rebecca | |
| 1988 | Robowar - Robot da guerra | Virgin | |
| 1988 | Ghost Town | Kate | |
| 1988 | Witchery | Linda Sullivan | |
| 1988 | Taxi Killer | N/A | |
| 1991 | Millions | Connie | |
| 1992 | Sweet Justice | Chris Barnes | |
| 2007 | Mattie Fresno and the Holoflux Universe | Millie Fresno | |

=== Television ===
| Year | Title | Role | Notes |
|---|---|---|---|
| 1978 | Vega$ | Julie | 1 episode |
| 1979 | Eight Is Enough | Vicki | 1 episode |
| 1979 | The Seeding of Sarah Burns | Judy | Television film |
| 1980 | To Race the Wind | Marcie | Television film |
| 1980–1981 | Texas | Courtney Marshall | Main role |
| 1983 | CHiPs | Lori | 1 episode |
| 1985 | Airwolf | Angelica Bolotin Horn | 1 episode |
| 1983–1986 | Knight Rider | Stephanie Mason/Stevie March | Episode 118: White Bird & Episode 411: The Scent of Roses; Episode 220: Let it Be Me |
| 1983–1987 | Capitol | Julie Clegg | Regular role |
| 1987 | The Bold and the Beautiful | Brooke Logan | Temporary substitute: 2 episodes |
| 1987 | Werewolf | Lila Storm | 1 episode |
| 1993-1995 | Loving | Tess Wilder | Regular role |
| 1995–1997 | The City | Tess Wilder Partou Huston | Regular role |
| 1998–2009, 2012 | One Life to Live | Lindsay Rappaport | Regular role |
| 2001 | Law & Order | Faye Ireland | 1 episode |
| 2005 | Law & Order: Criminal Intent | Lila Parsons/Lila Brown | 1 episode |

== Stage credits ==
| Year | Title | Role | Notes |
|---|---|---|---|
| 1995 | Les Misérables | Fantine | |
| 1992 | Run for Your Wife | Linda | |
