= Everybody Sunshine =

- German cover art

Studio album by David Hasselhoff
- Released: September 14, 1992
- Recorded: 1992
- Studios: Paradise Studios and Smash Tonstudio (Munich); Tritonus Tonstudio and Jack's Place (Berlin); Image Recording Inc. (Hollywood); Michael Boddicker Inc. Recording Studios (Sherman Oaks)
- Genres: Pop; pop rock
- Labels: White; Ariola; BMG
- Producer: Jack White

David Hasselhoff chronology
David (1991)	Everybody Sunshine (1992)	You Are Everything (1993)

Singles from Everybody Sunshine
- 1. "Everybody Sunshine" Released: August 1992; 2. "The Girl Forever" Released: October 1992; 3. "Darling I Love You" Released: December 1992

Everybody Sunshine is the sixth album by the American actor and singer David Hasselhoff, released on September 14, 1992, by White Records. The album features writing from Kristian Schultze, Peter Luedemann, Jerry Rix and the Gardeners. It was the last Hasselhoff album produced by Jack White; the two had collaborated since 1988. The album was not as successful as previous efforts, reaching the top-twenty in Austria and Switzerland, and the top-thirty in Germany.

== Background and release ==
Hasselhoff released three albums which became a huge success in Europe: Looking for Freedom (1989), Crazy for You (1990) and David (1991). Those albums were produced by German music producer Jack White. Everybody Sunshine became the last album to be produced by White, who collaborated with Hasselhoff since 1988. It also became Hasselhoff's last release under the White Records label, with his following albums being released by Ariola/BMG Records.

== Promotion ==
Hasselhoff performed the album's title track for the first time at German TV show Wetten, dass..? on November 7, 1992.

== Singles ==
The album's title track, which became the official song of the International Youth Games of 1993, peaked at numbers 26 and 27 in Austria and Switzerland, respectively. The second single, "The Girl Forever", only peaked at number 78 in Germany. The third single, "Darling I Love You", failed to chart.

== Commercial performance ==
Everybody Sunshine failed to match the success of his previous release, which became a top-ten album in Europe, David (1991), as it failed to enter the top-ten in Austria, Germany and Switzerland. In Austria, the album peaked at number 16, spending 13 weeks on the chart. In Switzerland, the album peaked at number 17, spending only nine weeks on the chart. In Germany, the album peaked at number 21, spending 14 weeks on the German charts.

Everybody Sunshine was certified Gold in Austria, Germany and Switzerland.

== Track listing ==
CD
No.	Title	Writer(s)	Length
1.	"Everybody Sunshine" (Official Song of the International Youth Games 1993)	Peter Luedemann	4:30
2.	"Joined at the Heart"	The Gardeners	4:48
3.	"Somewhere in a Dream"	Kristian Schultze	4:10
4.	"Voulez Vous Coucher Avec Moi"	The Gardeners	6:36
5.	"The Wilder Side of You"	Schultze; Jerry Rix	3:43
6.	"You're All I Want"	Schultze	4:06
7.	"It Feels So Right"	The Gardeners	4:20
8.	"Summer in the City"	The Gardeners	4:15
9.	"The Girl Forever"	Schultze; Rix	4:34
10.	"Foolish Lullaby"	Schultze	3:56
11.	"Darling I Love You"	Schultze; Rix	3:52
12.	"Is Everybody Happy" (Cliff Massie Remix)	Michael Boddicker; Uve Schikora	6:01

== Charts ==
Chart (1992–93)	Peak position
Austrian Albums (Ö3 Austria)	16
European Albums (Music & Media)	45
German Albums (Offizielle Top 100)	21
Swiss Albums (Schweizer Hitparade)	17

== Certifications ==
Region	Certification	Certified units/sales
Austria (IFPI Austria)	Gold	25,000^{*}
Germany (BVMI)	Gold	250,000^{^}
Switzerland (IFPI Switzerland)	Gold	25,000^{^}
^{*} Sales figures based on certification alone.^{^} Shipments figures based on certification alone.
