= Crazy for You (David Hasselhoff album) =

- German cover art

Studio album by David Hasselhoff
- Released: August 6, 1990
- Studio: Paradise Studios, Smash Tonstudio, D.I. Musikstudio Kristian Schultze (Munich); Michael Boddicker, Inc. (Hollywood); Garden Rake (Sherman Oaks)
- Genre: Pop; pop rock
- Label: White; Ariola; BMG
- Producer: Jack White

David Hasselhoff chronology
Knight Lover (1989)	Crazy for You (1990)	David (1991)

David Hasselhoff studio album chronology
Looking for Freedom (1989)	Crazy for You (1990)	David (1991)

Singles from Crazy for You
- 1. "Crazy for You" Released: August 1990; 2. "Freedom for the World" Released: December 1990; 3. "Let's Dance Tonight" Released: 1991

Music video
- "Crazy For You" on YouTube

Crazy for You is the fourth studio album by American actor and singer David Hasselhoff, released on August 6, 1990 by White Records. It was produced by German music producer Jack White, who previously produced his previous effort Looking for Freedom (1989). It features writing from White, Charles Blackwell, Mark Spiro and Diane Warren, among others. The album became another commercial success in Europe, reaching number one in Austria and Switzerland, as well as the top-ten in Germany, becoming Hasselhoff's highest selling album.

== Background and release ==
Crazy for You became Hasselhoff's second album to be produced by German music producer Jack White. White began working with Hasselhoff in 1988 on the song "Looking for Freedom". The song was a major chart hit in Europe and reached number one in Germany, where it spent eight consecutive weeks at number one. Due to its success, Hasselhoff's third studio album Looking for Freedom was released, also becoming very successful in Europe. During the promotion of the album, Hasselhoff already recorded several songs for his next release. Aside from White, Hasselhoff worked with several songwriters, including Diane Warren, Mark Spiro and Charles Blackwell. Crazy for You was released in August 1990, a year after the release of his previous album.

== Promotion ==
Following the Freedom Tour in 1990, Hasselhoff shortly started promotion for Crazy for You, performing the album's title track on the German TV show Wetten, dass..?, aired on September 15, 1990. Additionally, Hasselhoff promote the album on the 1990 Diamond Awards Festival (Belgium), the TV show Ein Kessel Buntes (Germany) and the 1991 World Music Awards (Monaco).

== Singles ==
The album's lead single, the title track, reached number four in Austria, as well as the top-twenty in Germany, and the top-thirty in Switzerland. "Freedom for the World", the second single, met with moderate success, peaking at numbers 30 and 48 in Austria and Germany, respectively. "Let's Dance Tonight", the third and final single, failed to chart.

== Commercial performance ==
In Austria, the album debuted at number 15 on the Austrian Albums chart, during the week of September 23, 1990, peaking at number one on its fourteenth week, during the week of December 23, 1990, spending one week atop the chart, becoming Hasselhoff's second number-one album in Austria, and his first since Night Rocker (1985). In Switzerland, the album debuted at number 22 on the Swiss Albums chart issue dated September 2, 1990, peaking at number one on its fifteenth week, during the week of December 9, 1990, spending one week atop the chart, eventually becoming Hasselhoff's first number-one album in Switzerland. In Germany, the album debuted at number 62 during the week of September 10, 1990, peaking at number seven during the week of December 24, 1990 and spending a total of 27 weeks on the German charts.

Crazy for You became a commercial success in Europe, which was certified Platinum in Germany; two-times Platinum in Austria and three-times Platinum in Switzerland, becoming Hasselhoff's best selling album in his career.

== Track listing ==
CD
No.	Title	Writer(s)	Length
1.	"Crazy for You"	Jack White; Charles Blackwell	4:36
2.	"I Wanna Move to the Beat of Your Heart"	Diane Warren	4:31
3.	"Passion"	White; Jerry Rix	4:13
4.	"Was It Real Love"	James Heath; Ren Toppano	4:30
5.	"September Love"	White; Mark Spiro	3:54
6.	"Keep the Jungle Alive"	Blackwell; Jan Lankwitz; Nhoah	5:52
7.	"Let's Dance Tonight"	White; Spiro	4:31
8.	"One and One Make Three"	White; Rix; Barry Mason	4:47
9.	"Kiss in the Night"	White; Blackwell	3:49
10.	"Freedom for the World"	White; Paul Anka	4:03
11.	"Let's Spend the Night Together"	White; Blackwell	4:03
12.	"Lights in the Darkness"	White	5:10

== Charts and certifications ==
=== Weekly charts ===
Chart (1990–91)	Peak position
Austrian Albums (Ö3 Austria)	1
European Albums (Music & Media)	13
German Albums (Offizielle Top 100)	7
Swiss Albums (Schweizer Hitparade)	1

=== Year-end charts ===
Chart (1990)	Position
German Albums (Offizielle Top 100)	82
Swiss Albums (Schweizer Hitparade)	21

Chart (1991)	Position
Austrian Albums (Ö3 Austria)	10
European Albums (Music & Media)	96
German Albums (Offizielle Top 100)	91
Swiss Albums (Schweizer Hitparade)	37

=== Certifications ===
Region	Certification	Certified units/sales
Austria (IFPI Austria)	2× Platinum	100,000^{*}
Germany (BVMI)	Platinum	500,000^{^}
Switzerland (IFPI Switzerland)	3× Platinum	150,000^{^}
^{*} Sales figures based on certification alone.^{^} Shipments figures based on certification alone.
