= Looking for... the Best =

Looking For ... the Best

Compilation album by David Hasselhoff
- Released: 9 October 1995 (Germany)
- Genre: Easy Listening
- Label: BMG Music

David Hasselhoff chronology
For You (1995)	Looking For ... the Best (1995)	Hooked on a Feeling (1997)

Looking for... the Best of David Hasselhoff is a greatest hits album released by David Hasselhoff in Germany in October 1995.

== Internet meme ==
Looking for has become the center of an Internet meme, in what Mashable described as a "review bomb": participants leaving humorous reviews on Amazon.com, many of which state that the song "Hot Shot City" is "particularly good".

== Track listing ==
1. "Looking for Freedom"
2. "Wir Zwei Allein"
3. "Crazy for You"
4. "Do the Limbo Dance"
5. "Flying on the Wings of Tenderness"
6. "Hot Shot City"
7. "Save the World"
8. "These Lovin' Eyes"
9. "Du"
10. "Fallin' in Love"
11. "Is Everybody Happy"
12. "Best Is Yet to Come"
13. "Freedom for the World"
14. "Je T'Aime Means I Love You"
15. "Do You Believe in Love"
16. "Danice Dance d'Amour"
17. "Everybody Sunshine"
18. "I Believe" (duet with Laura Branigan)
