= David (David Hasselhoff album) =

- German cover art

Studio album by David Hasselhoff
- Released: September 9, 1991
- Genre: Pop; pop rock
- Label: White; Ariola; BMG
- Producer: Jack White

David Hasselhoff chronology
Crazy for You (1990)	David (1991)	Everybody Sunshine (1992)

Singles from David
- 1. "Do the Limbo Dance" Released: July 1991; 2. "Gipsy Girl" Released: October 1991; 3. "Hands Up for Rock 'n' Roll" Released: December 1991; 4. "Are You Still in Love With Me" Released: 1991; 5. "Casablanca" Released: 1992

David is the fifth studio album by American actor and singer David Hasselhoff released on September 9, 1991 by White Records. It was produced by German music producer Jack White, and features writing from White, Charles Blackwell and Mark Spiro, among others. David reached number one in Austria and was certified double-Platinum. The album also reached the top 10 in Germany and Switzerland, and was certified Platinum in both countries.

== Background and release ==
Hasselhoff experienced great success in Europe with the release of the albums Looking for Freedom (1989) and Crazy for You (1990), which became highly successful in Germany, Austria and Switzerland, with both albums being produced by German music producer Jack White. Following this, Hasselhoff and White worked together again on a new album. They worked with most of their previous collaborators, including Charles Blackwell, Mark Spiro and Jerry Rix. David was Hasselhoff's third consecutive album to be produced entirely by White.

As David was released in September 1991, the album was re-released later that year under the title Close to Heaven, which was also the name of one of the tracks from the original David album. This version contains 10 of its 12 original tracks, with the songs "In Stereo" and "Feeling So High" not being included.

== Promotion ==
To promote David, as he did with his two previous albums, Hasselhoff embarked on several TV shows across Germany. Hasselhoff performed "Do the Limbo Dance" in Kultnacht; "Gipsy Girl" in Wetten, dass..? and "Hands Up for Rock'n Roll" in Hitparade. Additionally, Hasselhoff embarked on his third tour, Dreams Come True Tour, which took across Germany, Austria and Switzerland between November and December 1991.

== Singles ==
"Do the Limbo Dance" was released as the album's lead single. The song reached number one in Austria and was certified Gold. "Do The Limbo Dance" was also a hit in Germany and Switzerland, reaching the top-twenty in both countries.

The second single, "Gipsy Girl", peaked at number 12 in Austria. The third single, "Hands Up for Rock'n Roll" peaked at number 30 in Austria. The last two singles, "Are You Still in Love with Me" and "Casablanca", failed to chart.

== Commercial performance ==
In Austria, the album debuted at number 12 on the Austrian Albums chart, during the week of September 22, 1991, peaking at number one on its sixteenth week, during the week of January 12, 1992, spending one week atop the chart, becoming Hasselhoff's third number-one album in Austria. In Switzerland, the album debuted at number 13 on the Swiss Albums chart issue dated September 22, 1991, eventually peaking at number seven, and spending 19 total weeks on the chart. In Germany, the album debuted at number 55 during the week of September 30, 1991, peaking at number eight, and spending a total of 24 weeks on the German charts.

David was another great success in Europe, which was certified Platinum in Germany and Switzerland; and two-times Platinum in Austria.

== Track listing ==
CD
No.	Title	Writer(s)	Length
1.	"Do the Limbo Dance"	Jack White; Charles Blackwell	3:47
2.	"Gipsy Girl"	White; Blackwell	4:31
3.	"Are You Still in Love with Me"	White; Mark Spiro	4:27
4.	"Casablanca"	White; Spiro	4:11
5.	"I Feel Your Love in the Air"	White; Spiro; Jerry Rix	4:17
6.	"In Stereo"	White; Spiro	4:07
7.	"Hands Up for Rock'n Roll"	White; Blackwell	5:00
8.	"Feeling So High"	White; Blackwell	4:35
9.	"Close to Heaven"	Rix; Peter Bischof	4:11
10.	"Room in Your Heart"	White; Spiro	3:58
11.	"Who's Leaving Who"	White; Spiro	4:27
12.	"Taylor Ann"	White	3:29

== Charts and certifications ==
=== Weekly charts ===
Chart (1991–92)	Peak position
Austrian Albums (Ö3 Austria)	1
European Albums (Music & Media)	20
German Albums (Offizielle Top 100)	8
Swiss Albums (Schweizer Hitparade)	7

=== Year-end charts ===
Chart (1992)	Position
Austrian Albums (Ö3 Austria)	22

=== Certifications ===
Region	Certification	Certified units/sales
Austria (IFPI Austria)	2× Platinum	100,000^{*}
Germany (BVMI)	Platinum	500,000^{^}
Switzerland (IFPI Switzerland)	Platinum	50,000^{^}
^{*} Sales figures based on certification alone.^{^} Shipments figures based on certification alone.
