= You Are Everything (album) =

- German cover art

Studio album by David Hasselhoff
- Released: November 22, 1993
- Genre: Pop; pop rock; europop; schlager
- Label: Ariola; BMG
- Producer: Andreas Bärtels; Axel Kroell; Bruce Swedien; Dietmar Kawohl; Mark Holden; Mats Bjoerklund; Michael Fallon; Michael Sembello; Peter Fallon; René Moore

David Hasselhoff chronology
Everybody Sunshine (1992)	You Are Everything (1993)	Crazy for You (1994)

David Hasselhoff studio album chronology
Everybody Sunshine (1992)	You Are Everything (1993)	Du (1994)

Singles from You Are Everything
- 1. "Dance Dance d'Amour" Released: 1993; 2. "If I Could Only Say Goodbye" Released: 1993; 3. "Wir zwei allein" Released: 1993; 4. "The Best is Yet to Come" Released: 1994

You Are Everything is the seventh studio album by American actor and singer David Hasselhoff, released on November 22, 1993 by Ariola Records. On the album, Hasselhoff worked with a variety of producers and writers who replaced German producer Jack White, the main producer Hasselhoff worked with from 1988 to 1992. It marked the second time Hasselhoff write several songs for his own album, and the first since 1987. The album met with moderate success, reaching the top-ten in Austria, the top-twenty in Germany and the top-thirty in Switzerland.

== Background and release ==
After working with German music producer Jack White, who produced Hasselhoff's output from 1988 to 1992, Hasselhoff decided to work with other producers and writers including Andreas Bärtels, Axel Kroell, Bruce Swedien, Dietmar Kawohl and Mark Holden. The album also featured Hasselhoff as one of the main songwriters on the album. This marked the second time he wrote several songs for his own album, and the first since his second album Lovin' Feelings (1987), in which Hasselhoff wrote the song "Por Ti".

The album was re-released that year under the title Miracle of Love in the United Kingdom, which was also the name of one of the tracks from the original You Are Everything album. This version didn't include the songs "Hot Shot City", "Sunday Dreaming", "Highway to Your Heart" and "Caribbean Partytime". Instead, it was included a new song, "Blame It On the Night".

The track "Until the Last Teardrop Falls" was featured on the American TV series Baywatch season 5 episode "The Runaways".

== Promotion ==
To promote You Are Everything, Hasselhoff appeared on several TV shows across Europe, performing several singles from the album. Hasselhoff performed "Dance Dance d'Amour" at Flitterabend in Germany; "If I Could Only Say Goodbye" on his debut live performance at Top of the Pops in the United Kingdom; "Wir zwei allein" at Verstehen sie Spaß in Germany; "Hot Shot City" at Hitparade in Germany; "San Pedro's Children" at Club Dorothée in France; and "The Best is Yet to Come" at Glucksradgala in Germany. Additionally, Hasselhoff also toured across Germany in March 1994.

After the promotion of the album in Europe, on June 17, 1994, Hasselhoff was scheduled to perform a concert on pay-per-view from Atlantic City. The concert was expected to launch his singing career in the United States. However, on the night of the concert, O. J. Simpson was involved in his slow-speed chase in southern California. Viewership of the concert was significantly lower than expected due to the live coverage of the chase, and the event was ultimately a $1.5 million loss. Hasselhoff joked that "90 million people watched O. J. and three people watched me, including me and my mom and my dad".

== Singles ==
The album's lead single, "Dance Dance d'Amour", failed to chart. The second single, "If I Could Only Say Goodbye" peaked at number 35 on the UK Singles chart, becoming his first chart entry in the United Kingdom. The third single was the German version of "A Star Looks Down Tonight", titled "Wir zwei allein" as a duet with German singer Gwen, which became the album's most successful single, reaching the top-ten in Germany, Austria and Switzerland. "The Best is Yet to Come" served at the fourth and final single from the album, however, it failed to chart.

== Commercial performance ==
You Are Everything met with moderate success on the charts, but performed slightly better than Everybody Sunshine (1992). In Austria, the album peaked at number ten, spending 17 weeks on the chart, becoming Hasselhoff's fifth top-ten album in Austria. In Switzerland, the album peaked at number 27, spending only seven weeks on the chart. In Germany, the album peaked at number 20, spending ten weeks on the German charts.

You Are Everything was certified Gold in Austria and Switzerland.

== Track listing ==
CD
No.	Title	Writer(s)	Length
1.	"Dance Dance D'Amour"	David Hasselhoff; Andreas Bärtels; Dietmar Kawohl; Mark Holden; Nick Fogarty	3:18
2.	"Miracle of Love"	Bruce Fischer; Bruce Swedien; James Butler; René Moore	4:45
3.	"Hot Shot City"	Hasselhoff; Bärtels; Holden; Fogarty; Mats Björklund	3:48
4.	"Give Me Something Real"	Hasselhoff; Holden; Axel Kroell	3:44
5.	"Until the Last Teardrop Falls"	Amy Jordan; Gerald O'Brien; Mark Jordan; Stephen Sexton	5:29
6.	"Sunday Dreaming"	Bärtels; Fogarty; Joachim Heider	3:14
7.	"Highway to Your Heart"	Bärtels; Kawohl; Fogarty	3:38
8.	"You Are Everything"	Linda Epstein; Thom Bell	3:55
9.	"If I Could Only Say Goodbye"	James Berry; Michael Fallon; Peter Fallon	4:10
10.	"Tighter and Tighter"	Robert King; Tommy James	4:55
11.	"Current of Love"	Kevin Savigar; Todd Cerney	4:13
12.	"Caribbean Partytime"	David Milliner	3:26
13.	"San Pedro's Children"	Swedien; Moore; Jim Peterick	4:27
14.	"A Star Looks Down Tonight"	Hasselhoff; Bärtels; Kawohl; Holden	4:25
15.	"The Best Is Yet to Come"	Fischer; Swedien; Moore; Glen Ballard	5:23

== Charts and certifications ==
=== Weekly charts ===
Chart (1993–94)	Peak position
Austrian Albums (Ö3 Austria)	10
European Albums (Music & Media)	48
German Albums (Offizielle Top 100)	20
Swiss Albums (Schweizer Hitparade)	27

=== Certifications ===
Region	Certification	Certified units/sales
Austria (IFPI Austria)	Gold	25,000^{*}
Switzerland (IFPI Switzerland)	Gold	25,000^{^}
^{*} Sales figures based on certification alone.^{^} Shipments figures based on certification alone.
