= Night Rocker =

Studio album by David Hasselhoff
- Released: January 1985
- Genre: Rock, pop
- Length: 37:31
- Label: Epic Records (EU), Silver Blue Records (US)
- Producer: Joel Diamond

David Hasselhoff chronology
Night Rocker (1985)	Lovin' Feelings (1987)

Singles from Night Rocker
- 1. "Do You Love Me" Released: 1985; 2. "Night Rocker" Released: 1987; 3. "Our First Night Together" Released: 1989

Night Rocker is the debut studio album by the American actor David Hasselhoff. It was released in January 1985 on Silver Blue Records, produced by record producer Joel Diamond.

The album features three duets with Catherine Hickland: "Our First Night Together", "No Way to Be in Love" and "Let It Be Me"; all three songs were featured in the Knight Rider episode "Let It Be Me".

The album reached number one in Austria and was certified Platinum. It also reached the top 30 in Germany.

== Cover artwork ==
On the album's front cover, Hasselhoff poses on top of the hood of a black third-generation Pontiac Firebird (the same car used as KITT in the original Knight Rider series in which Hasselhoff starred) and holds a black and white Aria Pro II ZZ.

== Track listing ==
Vinyl/cassette Side A
No.	Title	Writer(s)	Length
1.	"Night Rocker"	Peter Myers	3:38
2.	"Crazy on a Saturday Night"	Mark Keller, Wendy Webb	3:38
3.	"Do You Love Me"	Berry Gordy	3:57
4.	"Our First Night Together" (with Catherine Hickland)	B. Elliott, Brock Walsh	3:58
5.	"She Cried"	Greg Richards, Ted Daryll	3:34

Side B
No.	Title	Writer(s)	Length
1.	"No Way to Be in Love" (with Catherine Hickland)	Walsh, Glen Ballard	4:12
2.	"Any Kind of Love at All"	Ray Dahrouge	4:03
3.	"All the Right Moves"	Martin Briley	3:32
4.	"No Words for Love"	Myers	4:05
5.	"Let It Be Me" (with Catherine Hickland)	Gilbert Bécaud, Manny Curtis, Pierre Delanoë	2:17

== Charts ==
=== Weekly charts ===
Chart (1985–89)	Peak position
Austrian Albums (Ö3 Austria)	1
European Albums (Music & Media)	100
German Albums (Offizielle Top 100)	30

=== Year-end charts ===
Chart (1987)	Position
Austrian Albums (Ö3 Austria)	13

=== Certifications ===
Region	Certification	Certified units/sales
Austria (IFPI Austria)	Platinum	50,000^{*}
^{*} Sales figures based on certification alone.
