= Lovin' Feelings =

Studio album by David Hasselhoff
- Released: October 18, 1987
- Recorded: 1986
- Studio: Mandrill Recording Studios (Auckland)
- Genre: Rock; pop
- Label: CBS
- Producer: Bruce Lynch

David Hasselhoff chronology
Night Rocker (1985)	Lovin' Feelings (1987)	Looking for Freedom (1989)

Singles from Lovin' Feelings
- 1. "Life Is Mostly Beautiful With You" Released: 1987

Lovin' Feelings is the second studio album by American actor and singer David Hasselhoff. It was released on October 18, 1987, by CBS Records. The album was produced by Bruce Lynch and recorded in Auckland, New Zealand. The album also was a departure from the rock background of his debut studio album Night Rocker (1985).

"Life is Mostly Beautiful With You" was released as the only single from the album. The album reached the top-twenty in Austria and Germany, being certified Gold in the former country.

== Track listing ==
Vinyl/cassette Side A
No.	Title	Writer(s)	Length
1.	"The Young and the Restless (Nadias Theme)"	Barry De Vorzon, Perry Botkin, Jr.	2:57
2.	"Lovin' Arms"	Tom Jans	2:56
3.	"Jean"	Rod McKuen	2:52
4.	"Historia de un Amor"	Carlos Eleta Almarán	2:54
5.	"Always on My Mind"	Wayne Carson, Johnny Christopher, Mark James	3:06
6.	"True Love Always"	Norman Petty, Buddy Holly	2:48
7.	"Stand By Me"	Ben E. King, Jerry Leiber and Mike Stoller	3:58

Side B
No.	Title	Writer(s)	Length
1.	"Life Is Mostly Beautiful With You"	T. Christoper, D. James	2:50
2.	"Go Away Little Girl"	Gerry Goffin, Carole King	2:10
3.	"How Am I Supposed to Live Without You"	Michael Bolton, Doug James	3:33
4.	"How Deep Is Your Love"	Barry Gibb, Robin Gibb, Maurice Gibb	3:08
5.	"After You"	D. James, D. Frank	2:59
6.	"Por Ti"	David Hasselhoff, R. Virhuez, M. Barone, F. Lucianiani	2:59
7.	"You've Lost That Lovin' Feelin'"	Phil Spector, Barry Mann, Cynthia Weil	3:20

== Charts ==
=== Weekly charts ===
Chart (1987–1989)	Peak position
Austrian Albums (Ö3 Austria)	11
European Albums (Music & Media)	64
German Albums (Offizielle Top 100)	16

=== Year-end charts ===
Chart (1989)	Position
German Albums (Offizielle Top 100)	99

=== Certifications ===
Region	Certification	Certified units/sales
Austria (IFPI Austria)	Gold	25,000^{*}
^{*} Sales figures based on certification alone.
