= David Hasselhoff =

American actor, singer, and television personality (born 1952)

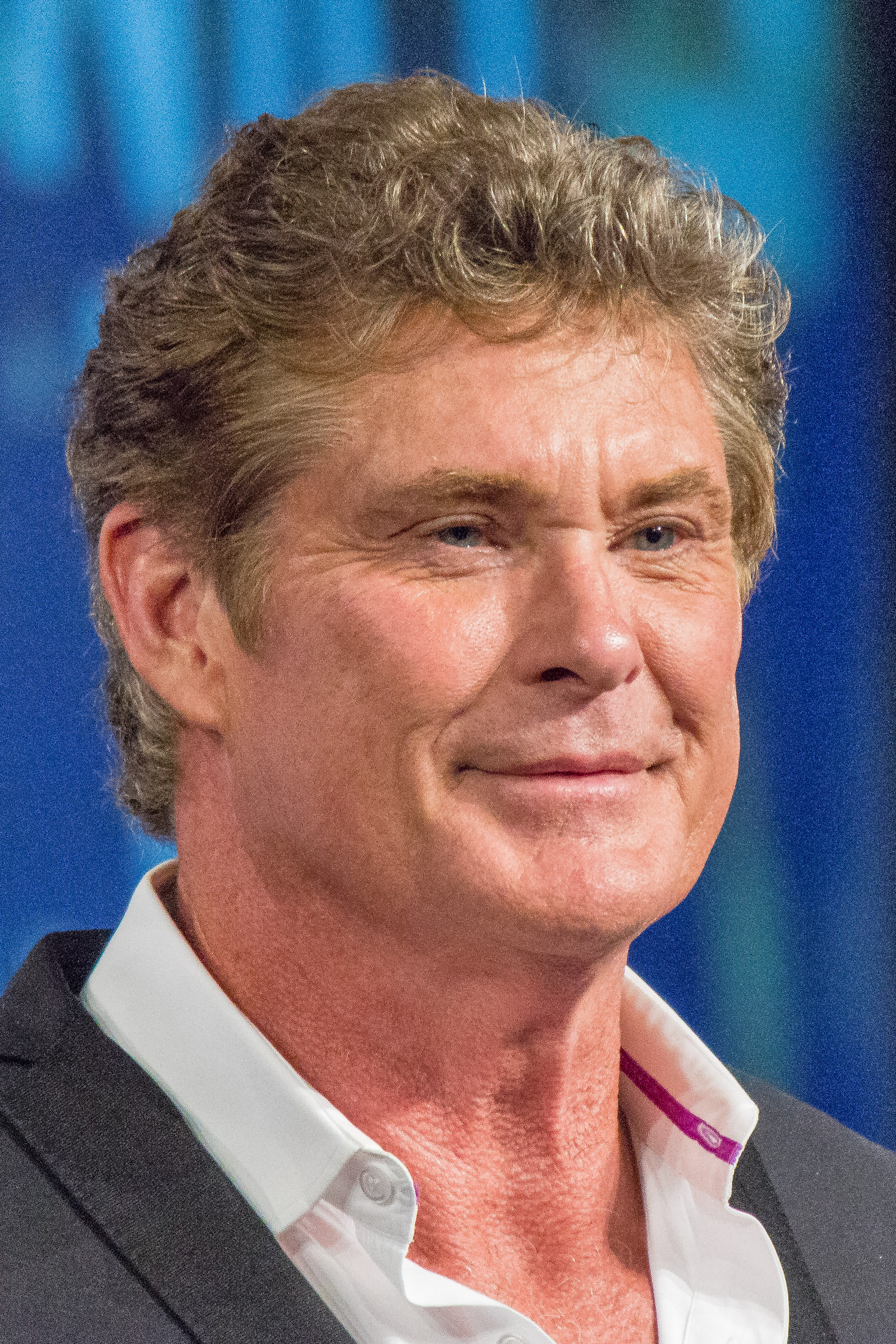
- Hasselhoff in 2014
- Born: David Michael Hasselhoff; July 17, 1952 (age 74); Baltimore, Maryland, U.S.
- Other name: The Hoff
- Education: Oakland University; California Institute of the Arts
- Occupations: Actor; singer; producer; television personality
- Years active: 1973–present
- Spouses: Catherine Hickland (m. 1984; div. 1989) Pamela Bach (m. 1989; div. 2006) Hayley Roberts (m. 2018)
- Children: 2, including Hayley
- Musical career
- Genres: Rock; pop rock; hard rock; soft rock
- Instruments: Vocals; guitar
- Years active: 1983–present
- Labels: Silver Blue; CBS; White; Ariola; Polydor; Edel; Sony; Cleopatra; Allied Artists Music Group
- Website: davidhasselhoffonline.com

David Michael Hasselhoff (born July 17, 1952), nicknamed "the Hoff", is an American actor, singer, producer, and television personality. He first gained recognition on the soap opera The Young and the Restless (1975–1982), playing the role of Dr. Snapper Foster. His career continued with his leading role as Michael Knight on the crime drama series Knight Rider (1982–1986) and as L.A. County Lifeguard Mitch Buchannon in the drama series Baywatch (1989–2000), the latter of which he also served as an executive producer.

Hasselhoff has appeared in films, including DodgeBall: A True Underdog Story (2004), The SpongeBob SquarePants Movie (2004), Click (2006), Hop (2011), and Piranha 3DD (2012). Before Samuel L. Jackson, Hasselhoff was the first actor to portray the Marvel Comics character Nick Fury in the television film Nick Fury: Agent of S.H.I.E.L.D. (1998). He made his Broadway debut in the musical Jekyll & Hyde (2000) and went on to star in other musicals including Chicago (2004) and The Producers (2007).

Hasselhoff has released a total of fifteen studio albums, which found success mostly in German-speaking parts of Europe, where he has garnered multiple gold and platinum awards, with the single "Looking for Freedom" reaching number one in Germany and Switzerland. Hasselhoff has also worked as a talent show judge on television shows such as America's Got Talent (2006–2009) and Britain's Got Talent (2011).

== Early life and education ==
Hasselhoff was born in Baltimore, Maryland, the son of Dolores Theresa (née Mullinex), a homemaker, and Joseph Vincent Hasselhoff, a business executive. His family is Roman Catholic with German, English, and Irish descent. His great-great-grandmother, Meta, emigrated with her family to Baltimore from Völkersen, Kingdom of Hanover, in 1865.

He spent his childhood in Jacksonville, Florida, and later lived in Atlanta, Georgia, where he attended Marist School. Hasselhoff made his theatrical debut at the age of seven in Peter Pan, and ever since his childhood dream was to have a career on Broadway. He graduated from Lyons Township High School in La Grange, Illinois, in 1970. He was a member of the speech team, senior discussion leaders, president of the choir, captain of the volleyball team and held roles in several plays (including one lead role as Matt in The Fantasticks). He studied at Oakland University, then studied theater at the California Institute of the Arts until 1973.

== Early career ==
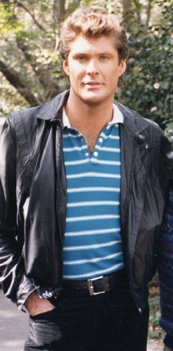
Hasselhoff in costume as Michael Knight in 1986

Hasselhoff portrayed Dr. "Snapper Foster" on The Young and the Restless from 1975 to 1982, leaving the series as the show wrote out many of their original characters. His feature film debut was in 1974 as "Boner" in Revenge of the Cheerleaders, which he did to get accredited into the Screen Actors Guild. At the time, he believed that the film would not be released, but it was: two years later, also appearing under the title Caught with their Pants Down. In 1979, he played "Simon" in Starcrash. He launched his singing career with guest appearances on the first season of children's program Kids Incorporated, performing "Do You Love Me". He guest-starred on two episodes of Diff'rent Strokes and the soap opera Santa Barbara as himself in 1984.

=== Knight Rider ===
Hasselhoff was recruited by then-NBC-president Brandon Tartikoff to star in the action crime drama series Knight Rider from 1982 to 1986 as Michael Knight. The actor has described Knight Rider as more than a TV show: "It's a phenomenon. It's bigger than Baywatch ever was." On the success of Knight Rider – "It's because it was about saving lives, not taking lives, and it was how one man really can make a difference."

He describes the acting he has done as "a little more difficult than if you had a regularly well-written script – like, if I was going to be in, say, Reservoir Dogs, or The Godfather, or Dances with Wolves or Lawrence of Arabia or ER -- I had to talk to a car." His role in the show led him to win Favorite Male Performer in a New TV Program at the 9th People's Choice Awards in 1983.

=== Baywatch ===
Hasselhoff returned to television on Baywatch which premiered in 1989. Although it was canceled after only one season, he believed the series had potential, so Hasselhoff revived it for the first-run syndication market in 1991, investing his own money and additionally functioning as executive producer. His contract stipulated royalties to be paid to him from the rerun profits, which gave him the financial liberty to buy back the rights to Baywatch from NBC.

In its second incarnation, Baywatch was much more successful. It ran for a total of 11 years and, from the 1990s until its series finale in 2001, was watched by almost 1 billion viewers across 140 countries, solidifying his status among the world's foremost television personalities of the said period. This success combined with his royalties and his other ventures have placed Hasselhoff's fortune at more than $100 million.

In 1991, Hasselhoff reprised his role as Michael Knight in the television film Knight Rider 2000 as a sequel to the original series. The movie served as a pilot for a proposed new series, but despite high ratings, the plan was abandoned.

In 1996, Hasselhoff was given a star on the Hollywood Walk of Fame. In 1997, he performed a duet with Filipino singer Regine Velasquez, which was used as the main theme for his 1998 movie Legacy. He made his Broadway debut in 2000 in the title role of Jekyll & Hyde. In August 2001, he hosted an event at the Conga Room, in Los Angeles honoring the Latin rock band Renegade for record sales in excess of 30 million units worldwide, taking the stage with the Latin rockers and singing in Spanish. Beginning on July 16, 2004, he played the lead role in London performances of Chicago for three months.

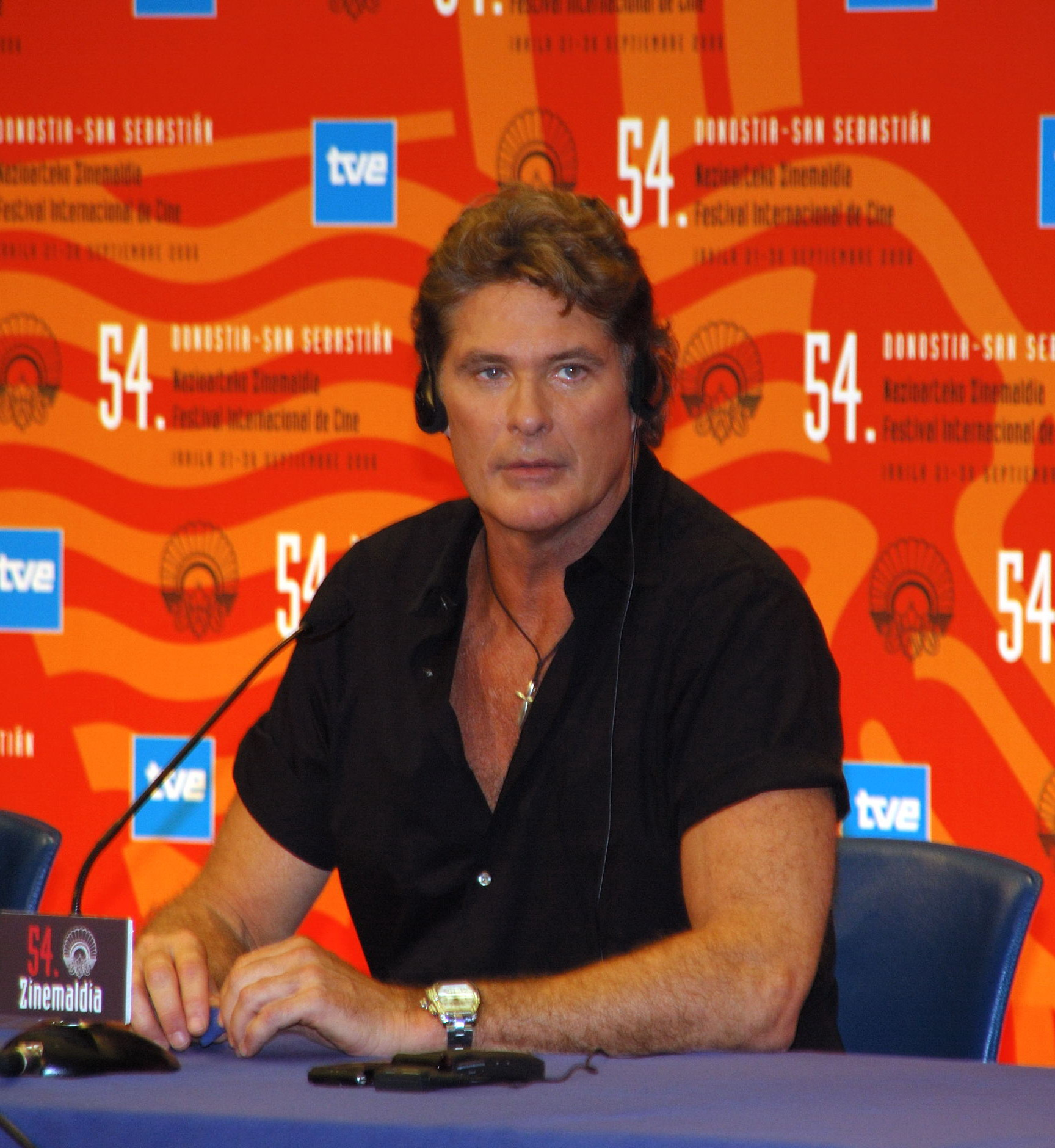
Hasselhoff in 2005

Hasselhoff has made several self-parodic appearances in movies. He had a major role in The SpongeBob SquarePants Movie, released November 19, 2004, starring as himself (though resembling his bygone Baywatch character) and meeting SpongeBob and Patrick (his full name is heard once in the movie; he is referred to as "Hasselhoff"). Hasselhoff also had another short appearance in the movie DodgeBall: A True Underdog Story as the dodgeball coach to the German national dodgeball team, Team Hasselhoff. Berating his team after being eliminated from a tournament, he shouts "Ihr seid alle Schweine!" (translated: "You are all pigs!", a common German insult) and smashes a photo of himself in his Baywatch attire. In 2004's EuroTrip, Hasselhoff appears in a washroom. In the 2006 Adam Sandler film Click Hasselhoff portrays Sandler's despicable boss. Hasselhoff also appears in an episode of Wildboyz. In 2007, he again played himself in the Jamie Kennedy comedy Kickin' It Old Skool.

In his music video for "Jump in My Car", he engages in self-parody; this time parodying his performance as Michael Knight in Knight Rider. The car in the video was a black Pontiac Trans Am with a pulsing LED and an interior nearly identical to that of the KITT car in the series. The video was shot in Sydney, Australia using a right-hand drive KITT replica, including KITT's ejection seat system.

In November 2006, Mel Brooks announced Hasselhoff would portray Roger DeBris, the director of the Nazi musical Springtime for Hitler, in the Las Vegas production of The Producers.

In 2006, Hasselhoff became a co-judge on NBC's America's Got Talent, a show that showcases America's best amateur entertainers. He also judged in the second, third and fourth seasons alongside Sharon Osbourne and Piers Morgan. On the 2007 season finale, Hasselhoff sang "This Is the Moment". He was replaced by comedian Howie Mandel for season five.

== Later career ==
Hasselhoff produced Baywatch for first run syndication. He has spoken at both the Oxford and Cambridge Student Unions.

He was a celebrity cast member on the eleventh season of Dancing with the Stars which increased in ratings by 36% from the previous year and served as a judge on NBC's America's Got Talent from 2006 to 2009. In 2011, he joined the Britain's Got Talent judging panel, as the additional fourth judge for series 5.

Hasselhoff was later honored on Comedy Central's The Comedy Central Roast of David Hasselhoff in addition to receiving the International Star of the Year Award for Outstanding Contribution to Global Entertainment by the Bollywood Awards. He was awarded the Comeback Star of the Year award during the VH1 Big in '06 Awards.

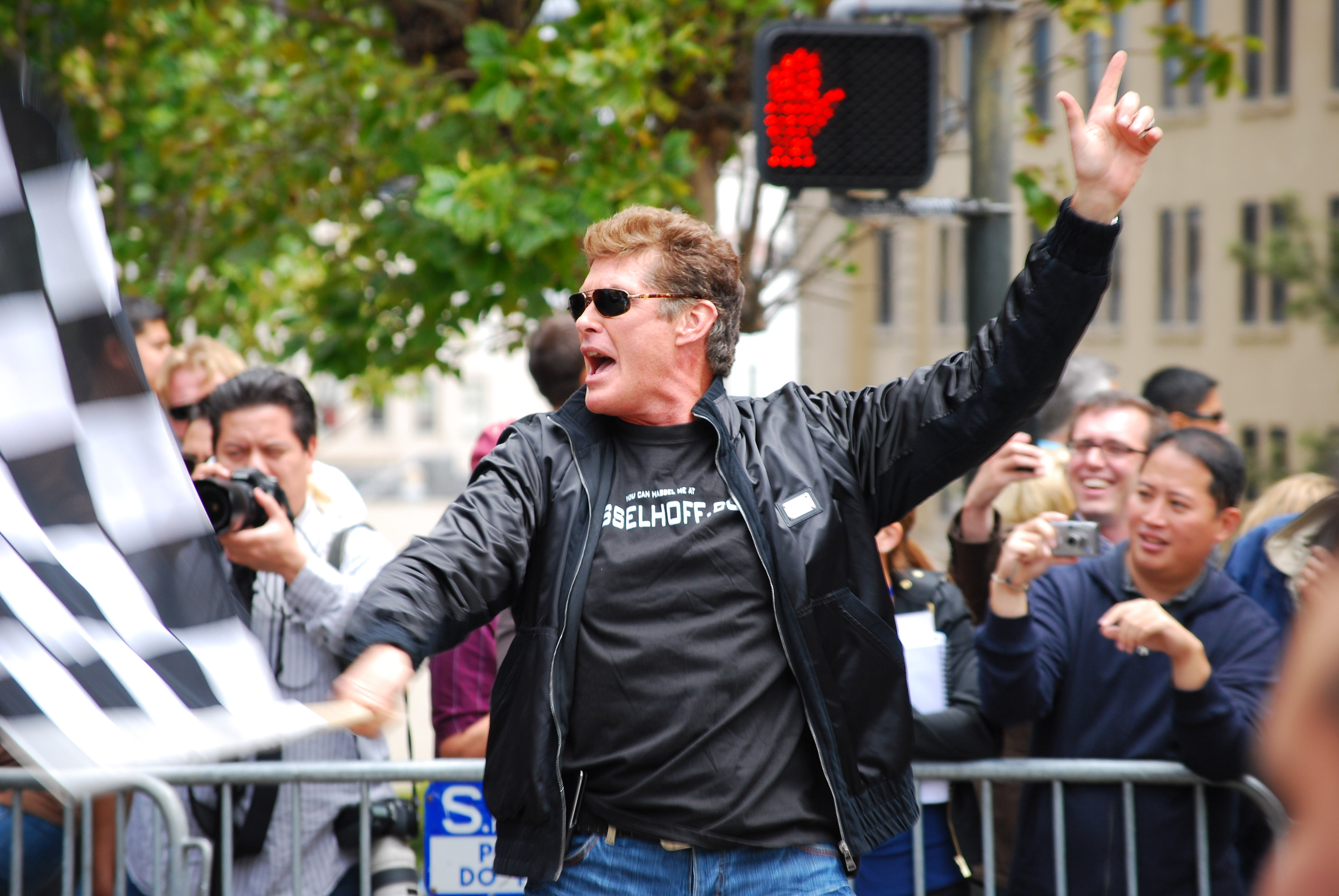
Hasselhoff waving the checkered flag at the 2008 Gumball 3000

In February 2008, towards the end of the Knight Rider 2008, he reprised his career-making role as Michael Knight as he walked on to introduce himself to his on-screen son, Mike Traceur. On November 12, 2008, he became the first celebrity downloadable character for the PlayStation Network's video game Pain.

In September 2009, he featured on a radio podcast for Compare the Meerkat, part of the advertising for British website, Compare the Market. He was the subject of an Early Day Motion in the House of Commons of the United Kingdom as a result of his support for the re-opening of Morecambe Winter Gardens.

In 2010, Hasselhoff guest hosted professional wrestling's WWE Raw in London, England. On August 15, 2010, Comedy Central aired a special "roast" of Hasselhoff.

Hasselhoff returned to The Young and the Restless, reprising his role as "Snapper" for a short arc that aired in mid-June 2010. Hasselhoff appeared as a contestant on season 11 of Dancing with the Stars. His professional dance partner was Kym Johnson. On September 21, 2010, they were the first couple eliminated from the competition. Coincidentally, Hasselhoff competed against Brandy Norwood, who judged alongside him in the first season of America's Got Talent.

In October 2010, it was announced that he would be playing Captain Hook in the New Wimbledon Theatre production of the pantomime Peter Pan from December 2010 to January 2011. He has reprised his role of "Hoff the Hook" for 2012 at the Manchester Opera House.

In 2011, he was a guest judge at the Belgian Idols competition. Hasselhoff became a judge on Britain's Got Talent in 2011 alongside Amanda Holden, Michael McIntyre and Simon Cowell. However, Hasselhoff was axed after only one series on the show and was replaced by David Walliams. In 2011, he revived his music career with a short tour across Germany, Austria and Switzerland. In the same year, Hasselhoff was featured in the trailer of the spin-off downloadable game, Burnout Crash!.

On February 24, 2014, he opened his own 10-week talk show in Sweden on TV3, in English. A similar show was later recorded in Finland, premiering on Sub on April 2, 2015.

On New Year's Eve he performed again at the Brandenburg Gate, arriving late because his plane was diverted to Hannover.

Hasselhoff had a major role in Sharknado 3: Oh Hell No! which premiered globally on July 22, 2015. He then starred in a new musical, Last Night a DJ Saved My Life at the Blackpool Opera House, late in 2015.

On May 18, 2017 Funner, California introduced its first official mayor: David Hasselhoff.

Hasselhoff also appeared in a cameo role in the Guardians of the Galaxy sequel, Guardians of the Galaxy Vol. 2 as himself. He additionally performed the song "Guardians Inferno" heard over the closing credits of the film and lent his appearance to a retro styled music video for the track found on the film's DVD and Blu-Ray release.

On October 28, 2019, Dolly Parton announced that David Hasselhoff would star in 9 to 5: The Musical at the Savoy Theatre in London's West End from December 2, 2019, until February 8, 2020.

=== Get Hasselhoff to Number 1 campaign ===
In 2006, fans of David Hasselhoff launched a tongue-in-cheek website "Get Hasselhoff to Number 1" in an attempt to get the 1989 hit "Looking for Freedom" to the top of the UK music charts through Internet downloads of the single. The campaign attracted attention on British radio and television broadcasts, in the national press and on the Internet. Over 40,000 people signed up to receive the "Hoff Alert" e-mail when the time had come to purchase the single. The focus of the campaign shifted to "Jump in My Car", when that was actually released as a single, and BBC Radio 1 DJ Scott Mills lent his support. On October 3, 2006, "the Hoff Alert" was sent out, and Hasselhoff promptly gained his highest ever UK chart entry (number 3) on October 8, 2006.

=== HoffSpace ===
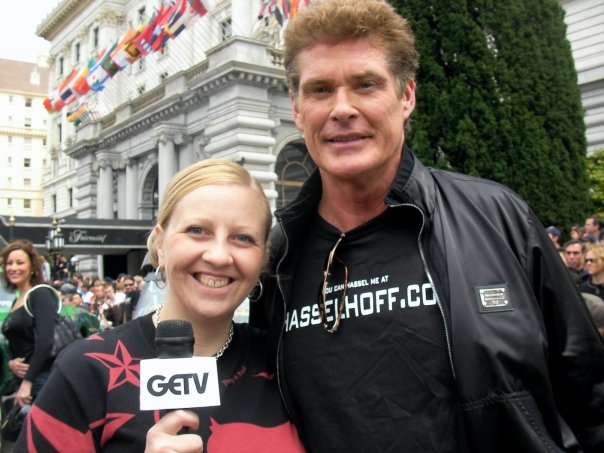
Hasselhoff with journalist Irina Slutsky promoting social networking venture HoffSpace, 2008

In 2008, Hasselhoff launched a MySpace-like social networking site, known as "HoffSpace". The site is now defunct.

=== The Hasselhoffs ===
Hasselhoff and his daughters, Taylor-Ann and Hayley, starred in a reality series on A&E called The Hasselhoffs. The series launched on December 5, 2010, and focused on Hasselhoff's attempts to resuscitate his career and launch his daughters onto the Hollywood stage.

On December 10, 2010, A&E confirmed in a statement that, after airing just two episodes, The Hasselhoffs had been canceled. According to Nielsen Co. ratings, the first episode was seen by 718,000 viewers. Viewers dropped to 505,000 for the second installment, which aired on the same evening. The full series aired in the UK on May 30, 2011, on The Biography Channel.

Hasselhoff stars in a casino-style game series online, produced in partnership with Eric Bischoff with Europe being among the first markets to roll out the game. In keeping with internet and online gambling culture in the UK, "The Hoff" series of games includes video slots and scratch-card type games, all played for real money in Europe's online casino environment. The first in the series of games launched on Valentine's Day in early March 2013, with media and promotional activities commencing in early February.

=== Hoff the Record ===
In 2014, UK channel Dave announced that it had commissioned Hoff the Record, a sitcom series in which Hasselhoff plays a fictionalized version of himself. The series started airing on June 18, 2015.

=== It's No Game and The HoffBot ===
In 2017 Hasselhoff appeared in short film It's No Game by director Oscar Sharp, playing "The HoffBot". Hasselhoff's lines were generated by a neural network artificial intelligence (called Benjamin) using a statistical model trained on his own 80s and 90s television performances. Hasselhoff said the A.I. "really had a handle on what's going on in my life and it was strangely emotional".

=== Motivational speaking ===
Hasselhoff works as a motivational speaker. In January 2014, he spoke before hundreds of students at New College Nottingham in Nottingham, England. In April 2019, Hasselhoff spoke before thousands of attendees at TwitchCon Europe in Berlin, Germany.

=== Hoff Roading ===
In late 2023, Hasselhoff alongside New Zealand comedian Rhys Darby were filming a New Zealand television series, Hoff the Beaten Track. The show was produced by the now defunct production company, Stripe Studios. It was later revealed that the company owed money to Hasselhoff. Stripe Studios along with nine other related entities went into receivership in March 2024 due to financial and legal issues. Managing director of Stripe Studios, Alex Breingan said that Hoff the Beaten Track was currently in post-production in December 2023. In May 2025, Warner Bros. Discovery New Zealand announced they had acquired the rights to the series, renaming it Hoff Roading, with Perpetual Entertainment picking up post-production.

== Music career ==
=== 1970s ===
On February 2, 1977, David Hasselhoff made his musical debut on The Merv Griffin Show performing "Nadia's Theme", the theme song from the American television soap opera The Young and the Restless, the show in which Hasselhoff was starring at the time. Ten years later his version of the song was included on his second album Lovin' Feelings (1987).

=== 1980s ===
Six years after his debut live performance, Hasselhoff released in 1983 his debut single "I Get the Message". In 1984, Hasselhoff made a guest appearance on the first season of Kids Incorporated, performing "Do You Love Me", which became the lead single from his upcoming debut studio album, Night Rocker, which was released in January 1985. The album was a big success in Austria, reaching number one there and being certified Platinum. In 1987, Hasselhoff released his second studio album, Lovin' Feelings, which reached the top-twenty in Austria and West Germany, and being certified Gold in the former country. That same year, due to the popularity of Knight Rider in Europe at the time, Hasselhoff embarked on his first headlining tour across Austria, with a special guest appearance from KITT.

In 1988, Hasselhoff released the song "Looking for Freedom". Due to its success, Hasselhoff released it on June 21, 1989, his third studio album of the same name, which was produced by German music producer Jack White. The album was a commercial success, reaching the top-five in Austria, West Germany and Switzerland; and being certified three-times Platinum in Europe. He was noted for his performance of the song at the Berlin Wall on New Year's Eve 1989, two months after the Wall had come down, but nine months before unification took place. Wearing a piano-keyboard scarf and a leather jacket covered in motion lights, Hasselhoff stood in a bucket crane and performed the song along with the crowd. The performance has had a lasting impact on German pop-culture with Hasselhoff commenting that the song became an "anthem" and "song of hope" for the people of East Germany. In 2004, Hasselhoff lamented the lack of a photo of him in the Checkpoint Charlie Museum in Berlin. In July 1989, Hasselhoff released his first compilation album, Knight Lover, which contains 17 greatest hits from his first two albums Night Rocker and Lovin' Feelings. The album reached the top-twenty in Switzerland; and the top-forty in West Germany.

=== 1990s ===
Following the breakthrough success of Looking for Freedom, Hasselhoff embarked on his second tour, The Freedom Tour, which took around April and May 1990, across West Germany and Switzerland. In August of that year, Hasselhoff released his fourth studio album, Crazy for You, which topped the charts in Austria and Switzerland, as well as reached the top-ten in West Germany, eventually becoming Hasselhoff's biggest-selling album in his career. In September 1991, Hasselhoff released his fifth studio album, David, which matched the success of its predecessor, with both the album and its lead single "Do The Limbo Dance" reaching number one in Austria. That same year, in order to promote David, Hasselhoff embarked on his third tour, the Dreams Come True Tour, which took around November and December 1991, across Austria, Germany and Switzerland. In late 1991, two compilation albums were released: Looking for Freedom and For You, with the former album including hits from 1989 and 1990, and the latter including hits from 1985 to 1987; however, both albums failed to chart. In September 1992, Hasselhoff released his sixth studio album Everybody Sunshine, which became his last album being produced by Jack White, who collaborated with Hasselhoff since 1988. Though the album was certified Gold in Austria, Germany and Switzerland, it failed to reach the commercial heights of his three previous albums, Looking for Freedom, Crazy for You and David.

In November 1993, Hasselhoff released his seventh studio album You Are Everything, which also met with moderate success in Europe, though it reached the top-ten in Austria and was certified Gold. The songs "If I Could Only Say Goodbye" and "Wir zwei allein" became hits in Europe, with the former becoming his first UK chart entry ever peaking at number 35, and the latter becoming another top-ten hit in Austria, Germany and Switzerland. That same year, he released the single "Pingu Dance" based on the children's show Pingu, and his fourth compilation album, Crazy for You, which contains several hits from 1989 to 1991, however, both releases failed to chart. In 1994, Hasselhoff toured across Germany in order to promote You Are Everything. That same year, he was scheduled to perform a concert on pay-per-view from Atlantic City. The concert was expected to help his singing career in the United States. However, on the night of the concert, O. J. Simpson was involved in his slow-speed chase in southern California. Viewership of the concert was significantly lower than expected due to the live coverage of the chase, and the event was ultimately a $1.5 million loss. Hasselhoff joked that "90 million people watched O. J. and three people watched me, including me and my mom and my dad". Following this, Hasselhoff released his eighth studio album Du, which became Hasselhoff's first studio album not to receive any certification in Europe, and also met with moderate success on European charts.

In 1995, Hasselhoff released four greatest hits albums, including his self-titled fifth compilation album, David Hasselhoff, released on April 11, 1995, in the United States, which became his first album in eight years since Lovin' Feelings (1987) to be released in the US. The record includes several songs from the albums You Are Everything and Du. A new recording, called "Fallin' in Love", was released as the only single from the album. To promote David Hasselhoff, Hasselhoff performed for the first time "Fallin' in Love" on The Tonight Show with Jay Leno aired on April 13, 1995. As attempting to launch his singing career in the US, both the album and the single "Fallin' in Love" were commercially unsuccessful, as failed to enter any Billboard chart. His sixth and seventh compilation albums, Watch Out for the Bay and Is Everybody Happy were released in mid-1995, with the former album including songs from 1985 to 1987; and the latter, from 1989 to 1991; however, both albums failed to chart as well. His eighth compilation album, Looking for... the Best was released in October 1995, which contains 18 greatest hits from 1989 to 1994, including the hits "Looking for Freedom" (1988), "Crazy for You" (1990), "Do The Limbo Dance" (1991), "Everybody Sunshine" (1992), "Wir zwei allein" (1993) and "Du" (1994), as well as the US single "Fallin' in Love" (1995), and a new recording, titled "I Believe" with Laura Branigan. The album charted in Austria, peaking at number 50.

Two years later, in 1997, Hasselhoff signed with Polydor Records and released his ninth studio album, Hooked on a Feeling. The album became Hasselhoff's least successful album to that point in his career, becoming his first studio album that failed to chart in Germany. In 1999, a ninth compilation album was released, Watch Out for Hasselhoff.

=== 2000s ===
Between 2001 and 2004, two more compilations were released, The Very Best Of and Greatest Hits. Seven years after the release of Hooked on a Feeling, Hasselhoff returned to the music scene with his tenth studio album, David Hasselhoff Sings America, released in August 2004, with the album performing slightly better on European charts, peaking at numbers 11 and 27 in Austria and Germany, respectively. That same year, Hasselhoff released his eleventh studio album, which became his first Christmas album, The Night Before Christmas. The album met with negative reviews and failed to enter any chart. In 2006, Hasselhoff released "Jump in My Car", which debuted at number three on the UK Singles Chart, becoming Hasselhoff's first and only top-ten single in the UK. It also became his first and only Australian chart entry, peaking at number 50.

In May 2006, Hasselhoff was mentioned in an interview of Dirk Nowitzki, an NBA star playing for the Dallas Mavericks and a native of Germany. Nowitzki was asked what he does to concentrate when shooting foul shots. Dirk replied that he sings "Looking for Freedom" to himself. He meant this as a joke but it was thought to be a serious answer. Shortly thereafter, Hasselhoff attended the May 26, 2006, Mavericks home playoff game where they faced the Phoenix Suns in the NBA Western Conference Finals. Interviewed by Craig Sager, Hasselhoff stated he was as much a fan of Nowitzki as Nowitzki was a fan of him. In The 2006 NBA Finals, fans of the Miami Heat in the American Airlines Arena held up facial photos of Hasselhoff and chanted his name when Nowitzki went to the foul line. On August 2, 2006, he proclaimed himself "King of the Internet" in a tongue-in-cheek advertisement for Pipex. In December 2008, he sang the national anthem at the NCAA Las Vegas Bowl. Although the game was televised live by ESPN, the station chose not to broadcast Hasselhoff's performance. In 2008, a twelfth compilation was released under the title of Das Allerbeste.

=== 2010s ===
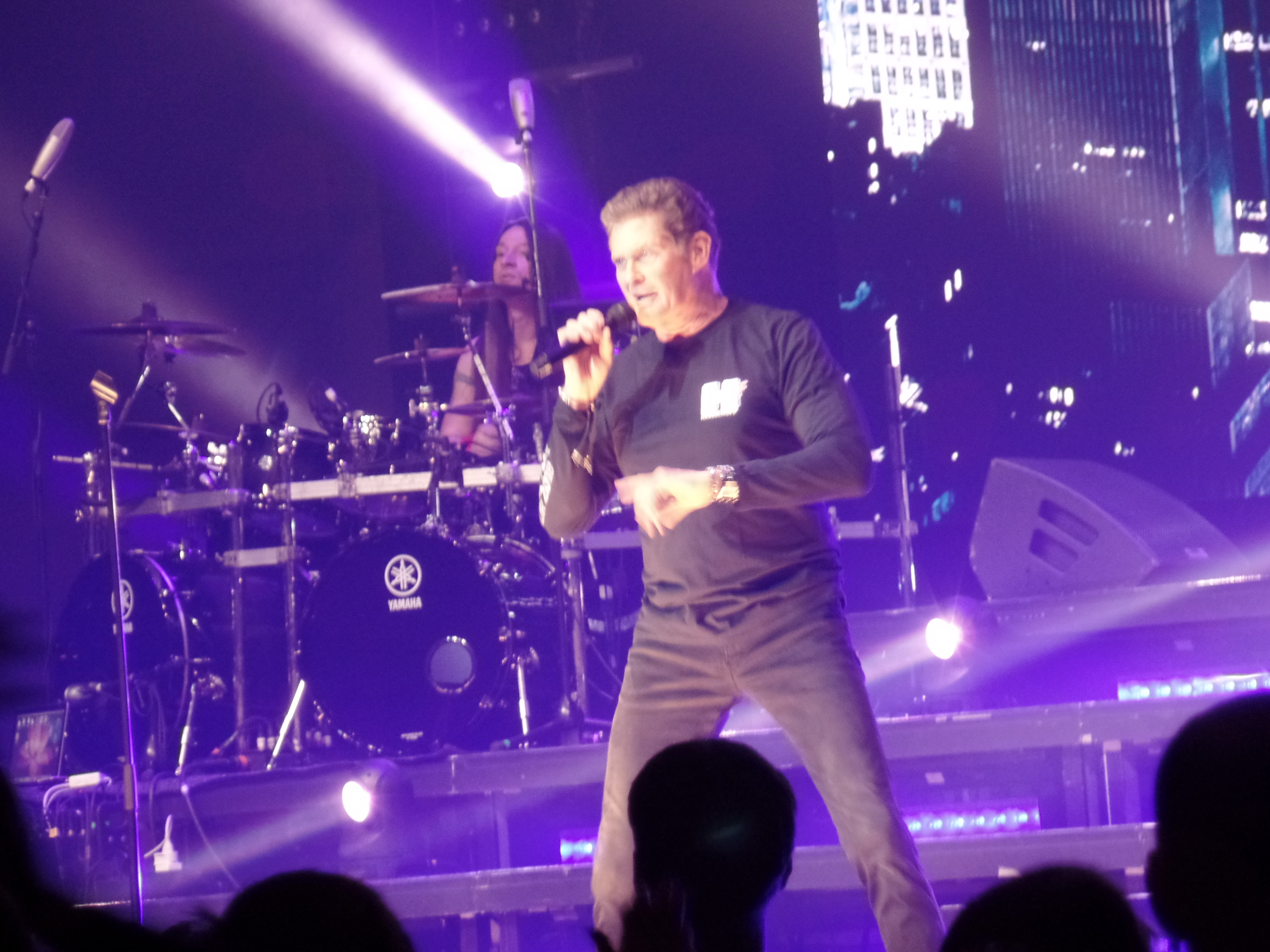
Hasselhoff performing in April 2018

Seven years after his last album, Hasselhoff released in 2011 his twelfth studio album, A Real Good Feeling, which reached number three in Austria, the top-thirty in Germany and became Hasselhoff's first album in fourteen years since Hooked on a Feeling (1997) to chart in Switzerland. Hasselhoff toured across those countries to promote the album. In 2012, he released his thirteen studio album This Time Around, however, it failed to chart.

In 2015, he recorded the single "True Survivor", accompanied by a music video, which featured as the lead track for the 2015 Swedish short film Kung Fury. The song was composed by Mitch Murder (Johan Bengtsson). Recorded in Sweden, the song and the video is designed as an ostentatious over-the-top 1980s homage/parody, with the video featuring dinosaurs, kung fu, Adolf Hitler, skateboarding, Norse Gods and time travelling. Hasselhoff claimed that he had received the offer to record the song and the video by a request from Sweden Universal to "sing a tribute to the '80s". Hasselhoff performed a live version of the song during the 2016 Guldbagge Awards. "True Survivor" debuted and peaked at number 94 on the Canadian Hot 100, becoming his first chart entry in Canada. In 2017, a retro music video called "Guardians' Inferno" was released as a bonus on the Guardians of the Galaxy Vol. 2 home release, where Hasselhoff does the singing.

In September 2019, Hasselhoff released his fourteenth studio album, Open Your Eyes. The album consists of covers of popular songs such as "Sweet Caroline" and "Lips Like Sugar", with all but one song featuring collaborations from other artists, including Todd Rundgren and Steve Stevens. The album charted in Austria, Germany and Switzerland, with the former reaching the top-thirty there. A promotional music video for the title track was released on YouTube on September 9, followed by the album's release on CD, vinyl, digital download and streaming services on September 27, 2019. To promote the album, as well as celebrating the 30th anniversary of the album Looking for Freedom and the song of the same name, Hasselhoff toured across Austria, Germany and Switzerland on the Freedom! The Journey Continues Tour, which took place in October 2019.

=== 2020s ===
On December 10, 2020, Hasselhoff released his first heavy metal song titled "Through The Night". The song was recorded alongside CueStack, an Austrian duo who also enlisted the help of Beartooth frontman Caleb Shomo to produce a retro synth-wave remix of the song.

== Personal life ==
Hasselhoff's autobiography Making Waves was released in the UK in September 2006. In an interview in April 2006, he said the book would present the "last chapter" regarding controversial elements of his personal life.

In November 2015, Hasselhoff posted a YouTube video in which he announced that he had changed his name to "David Hoff". It was then reported that he was not changing his name; that the video was an excerpt from an upcoming advertising campaign.

After touring Glasgow in late 2015, Hasselhoff stated that he supports Scottish football team Partick Thistle F.C.

=== Family ===
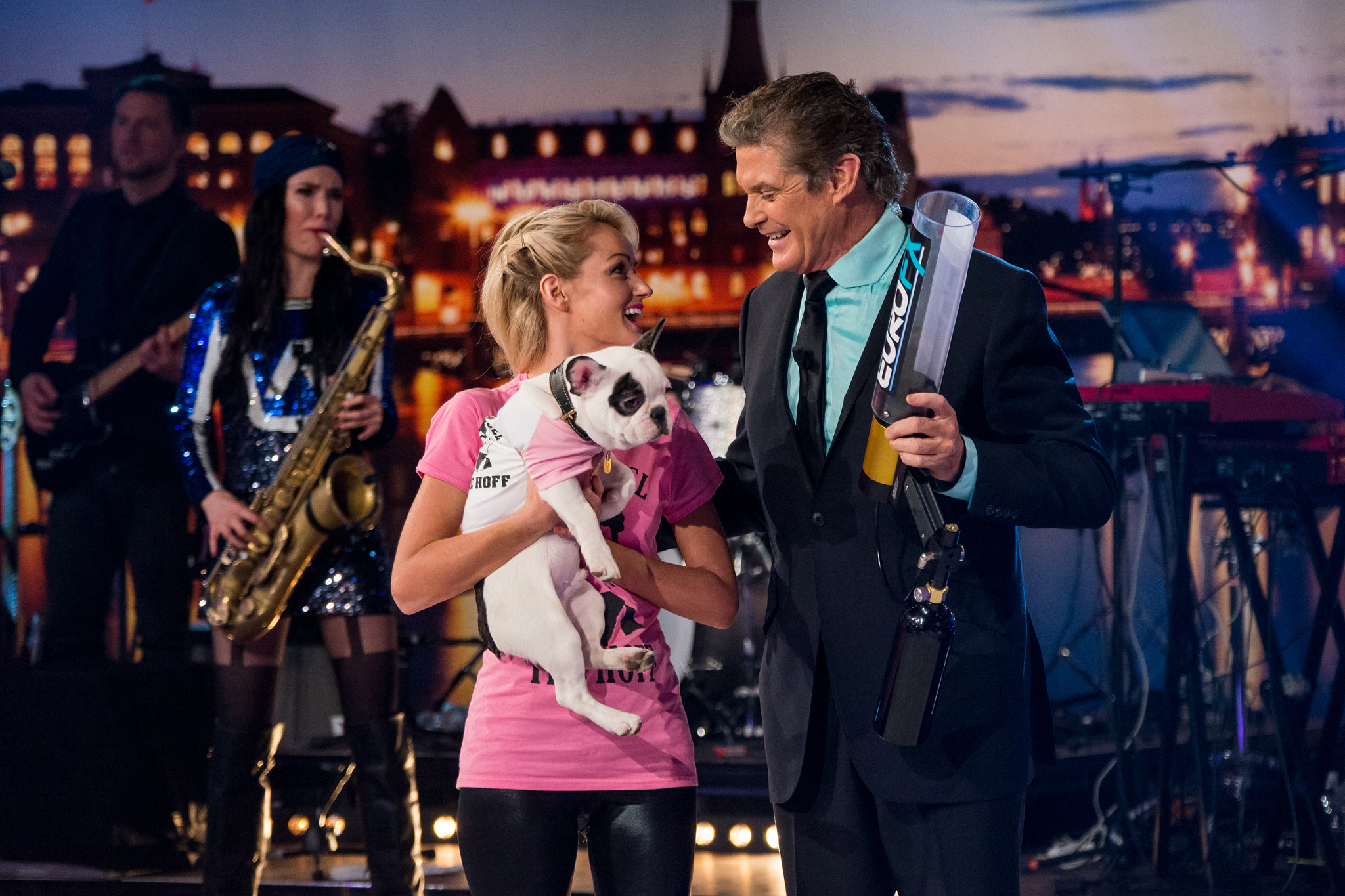
Hasselhoff with now-wife Hayley Roberts in 2014

Hasselhoff was married to actress Catherine Hickland from March 24, 1984, to March 1, 1989.

Hasselhoff married actress Pamela Bach in December 1989. The couple had two daughters: Taylor Ann Hasselhoff, born May 5, 1990, who attended the University of Arizona and was cast for the 2015 season of Rich Kids of Beverly Hills, and actress Hayley Hasselhoff, born August 26, 1992. In January 2006, Hasselhoff announced he was filing for divorce, citing irreconcilable differences. Their divorce was finalized in August 2006. Bach was given custody of one daughter and Hasselhoff custody of the other, until Hasselhoff later obtained custody of both. As of December 2010 he resided in Southern California with his daughters.

In late 2011, Hasselhoff began dating Hayley Roberts, from the town of Glynneath in Wales. As a new couple they attended Gordon Ramsay's Christmas special of that year. In the 2012 sequel, when asked about engagement they related how they had discussed it. On July 31, 2018, they married in Apulia, and in August they honeymooned in the Maldives. Hasselhoff is a fan of Welsh rugby union, and the couple regularly attend matches in Wales.

In May 2016, Hasselhoff said he could not afford alimony of $252,000 a year to Bach anymore, because he had less than $4,000 in cash to his name. He made $112,000 a month, but spent $66,000 and due to alimony, taxes and living expenses he had little left. In September 2017, Hasselhoff filed formal requests to end alimony payments and cited his ex-wife's "failure to make any efforts to become self-supporting, contribute to her own support, or even make any efforts to gain job skills." Hasselhoff and Bach reached an agreement which reduced payments since December 1, 2017, from $10,000 to $5,000 per month. Bach was found dead of what appeared to be a self-inflicted gunshot wound at her home on March 5, 2025. Her death was ruled a suicide by the Los Angeles County Medical Examiner's Office.

=== Alcoholism ===
On May 3, 2007, a viral video surfaced online of Hasselhoff appearing to be severely drunk inside his home. His daughter, Taylor Ann, who filmed the video, can be heard interrogating him and asking him to stop abusing alcohol. She also warns her father he could be jeopardizing his spot on the Las Vegas production of The Producers he starred in at the time. In the wake of the leaked clip, Hasselhoff issued a statement saying it was recorded by Taylor Ann so that he could see how he behaved while intoxicated and the footage was deliberately released. As a result of the video, Hasselhoff's visitation rights with his two daughters were suspended on May 7, 2007, for two weeks until the video's authenticity and distributor were determined. In May 2009, Hasselhoff's attorney, Mel Goldsman, described Hasselhoff as "a recovering alcoholic".

== Awards and nominations ==
Year	Award	Category	Work	Result
1983	People's Choice Awards	Favorite Male Performer in a New TV Program	Himself	Won
1986	Bravo Otto	Best Male TV Star	Knight Rider	Nominated
1988	Bravo Otto	Best Male TV Star	Knight Rider	Won
1989	Bravo Otto	Best Male TV Star	Himself	Won
1990	Bravo Otto	Best Male TV Star	Baywatch	Won
1990	Bambi Award	For his anthem of unity	"Looking for Freedom"	Won
1991	Bravo Otto	Best Male TV Star	Baywatch	Won
1992	Bravo Otto	Best Male Singer	Himself	Nominated
1993	Bravo Otto	Best Male Singer	Himself	Nominated
1996	Hollywood Walk of Fame	Star	Himself	Honored
2003	TV Land Awards	Favorite Dual-Role Character	Knight Rider	Nominated
2005	Bollywood Awards	International Star of the Year Award for Outstanding Contribution to Global Entertainment	Himself	Won
2006	TV Land Awards	Greatest Gear or Admirable Apparatus	Knight Rider	Nominated
2006	VH1 Big in '06 Awards	Comeback Star of the Year	Himself	Won
2007	TV Land Awards	The "Who Knew They Could Sing?" Award	Himself	Won
2013	Fallbrook International Film Festival	Career Achievement in Motion Picture and Television	Himself	Won
2013	Golden Raspberry Awards	Worst Supporting Actor	Piranha 3DD	Nominated
