= Jasmin Wagner discography =

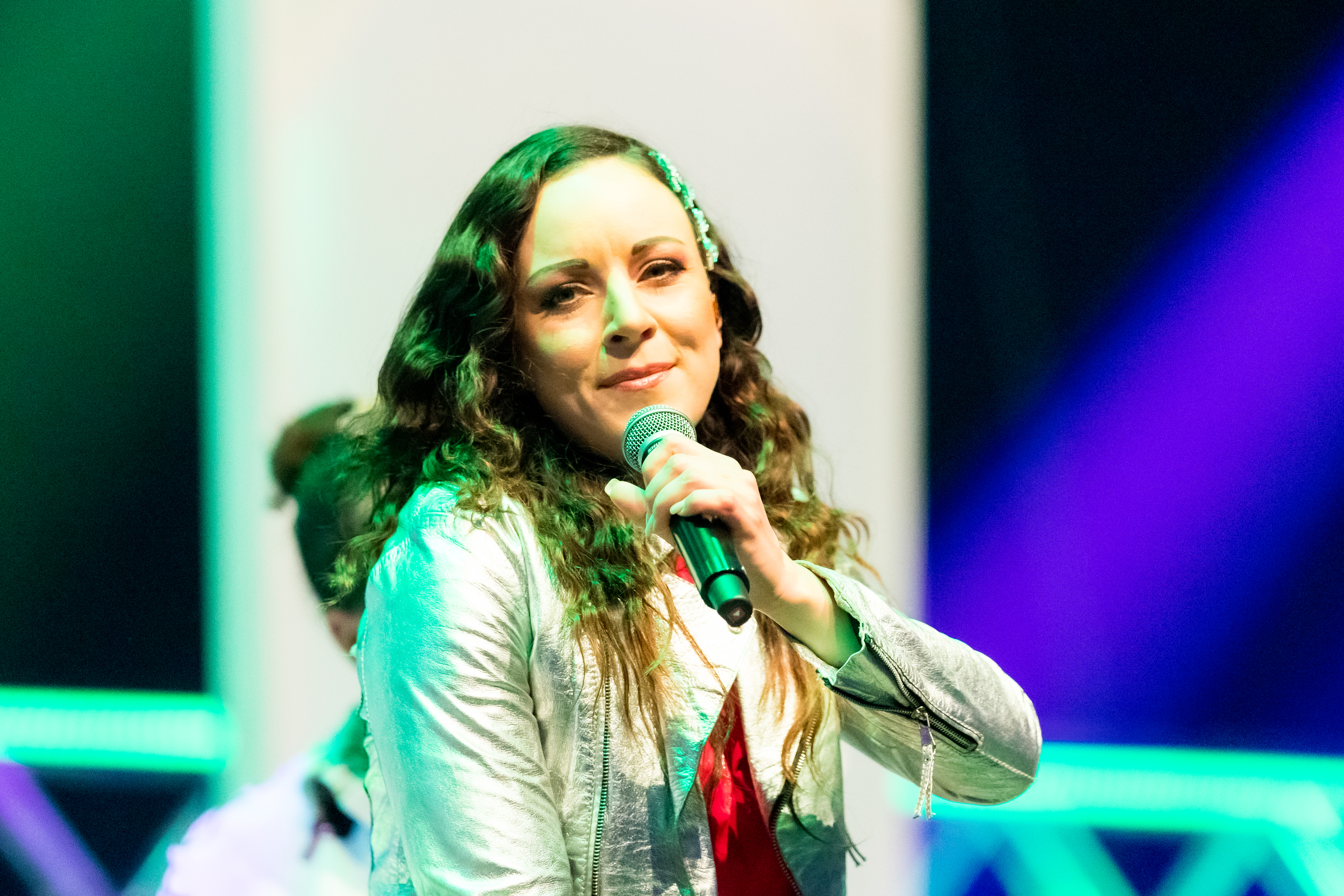
- Wagner in 2019
- Studio albums: 6
- Soundtrack albums: 1
- Live albums: 1
- Compilation albums: 3
- Singles: 38
- Music videos: 39
- Promotional singles: 10

The discography of German singer Jasmin Wagner, best known as Blümchen, also known as Jasmin, Blossom or Denim Girl, consists of six studio albums, one soundtrack album, one live album, two remix albums, three compilation albums, two video albums, 38 singles, including 10 as featured artist, 10 promotional singles, and 39 music videos, including nine as featured artist. The first release was the debut studio album Herzfrequenz in 1996, preceded by the chart hit "Herz an Herz", a Paso Doble cover version. The albums Verliebt..., Jasmin, Die Welt gehört dir and Die Versuchung followed in 1997, 1998, 2000 and 2006 respectively. In 2019, after a hiatus, Wagner returned as Blümchen and released her first single "Computerliebe", again a Paso Doble cover version.

== Albums ==
=== Studio albums ===
List of studio albums, with selected chart positions, sales figures and certifications
Title	Album details	Peak chart positions							Certifications	Sales
Title	Album details	GER	AUT	SWI	NOR	SWE	FRA	UK	Certifications	Sales
Herzfrequenz (Heartbeat as Blossom)	Released: 1996 (GER); Label: Control; Formats: CD, LP, cassette	18 (48 We.)	14 (16 We.)	15 (13 We.)	—	—	—	—		GER: 320.000; WW: 400.000
Verliebt... (In Love... as Blossom)	Released: 1997 (GER); Label: Control; Formats: CD, LP, cassette	7 (46 We.)	11 (16 We.)	9 (11 We.)	—	—	—	—		GER: 360.000; AUT: 25.000; JAPAN: 10.000 TAIWAN: 20.000 HUNGARN: 14.000 POLEN:25.000 Tschechien: 4.000 WW: 500.000
Jasmin	Released: 1998 (GER); Label: Control; Formats: CD, LP, cassette	8 (23 We.)	19 (6 We.)	20 (5 We.)	—	25 (19 We.)	—	—		GER: 270.000; SWE: 15.000
Die Welt gehört dir	Released: 2000 (GER); Label: Edel; Formats: CD, LP, cassette	18 (5 We.)	—	86 (1 We.)	—	40 (5 We.)	—	—		GER: 80.000
Die Versuchung (as Jasmin Wagner)	Released: 2006 (GER); Label: Polydor; Formats: CD, LP, cassette	98 (1 We.)	—	—	—	—	—	—		
Von Herzen (as Jasmin Wagner)	Released: 2021 (GER); Label: Mirabella Musik; Formats: CD, LP	6 (3 We.)	30 (1 We.)	25 (1 We.)	—	—	—	—		GER : 20.000
"—" denotes a studio album that did not chart or was not released in that territory.

=== Soundtrack albums ===
List of soundtrack albums, with selected chart positions, sales figures and certifications
Title	Album details	Peak chart positions		
Title	Album details	GER	AUT	SWI
Alexandra (as Jasmin Wagner)	Released: 2012 (GER); Label: Reader's Digest; Formats: CD	—	—	—
"—" denotes a soundtrack album that did not chart or was not released in that territory.

=== Live albums ===
List of live albums, with selected chart positions, sales figures and certifications
Title	Album details	Peak chart positions		
Title	Album details	GER	AUT	SWI
Live in Berlin	Released: 1999 (GER); Label: Edel; Formats: CD, cassette	57 (6 We.)	—	—
"—" denotes a live album that did not chart or was not released in that territory.

=== Remix albums ===
List of compilation albums, with selected chart positions, sales figures and certifications
Title	Album details	Peak chart positions		
Title	Album details	GER	AUT	SWE
Für Jasmin – Das Blümchen Remix Album	Released: 1996 (GER); Label: Control; Formats: CD	—	—	—
The ultimate single remixes	Released: 2007 (GER); Label: PSP Music; Formats: Digital Download	—	—	—
"—" denotes a compilation album that did not chart or was not released in that territory.

=== Compilation albums ===
List of compilation albums, with selected chart positions, sales figures and certifications
Title	Album details	Peak chart positions		
Title	Album details	GER	AUT	SWE
Für immer und ewig	Released: 2000 (GER); Label: Edel; Formats: CD	95 (1 We.)	—	51 (1 We.)
Meine größten Erfolge	Released: 2000 (GER); Label: Edel; Formats: CD	—	—	—
Best Of	Released: 2010 (GER); Label: Edel; Formats: CD	—	—	—
"—" denotes a compilation album that did not chart or was not released in that territory.

== Singles ==
=== As lead artist ===
List of singles as a lead artist, with selected chart positions, sales figures and certifications
Year	Single	Peak chart positions								Sales	Information	Album
Year	Single	GER	AUT	NL	NOR	SWE	SWI	UK	FR	Sales	Information	Album
1995	"Herz an Herz" (1996 "Heart to Heart" as Blossom)	4 (18 We.)	9 (12 We.)	—	—	—	7 (14 We.)	—	—	GER: 430.000 WW: 500.000	Paso Doble cover	Herzfrequenz/Heartbeat
1996	"Kleiner Satellit (Piep, Piep)"	9 (14 We.)	14 (11 We.)	—	—	—	10 (9 We.)	—	—	GER: 200.000		Herzfrequenz/Heartbeat
1996	"Boomerang"	7 (16 We.)	10 (12 We.)	—	16 (1 We.)	—	9 (8 We.)	—	—	GER: 260.000		Herzfrequenz/Heartbeat
1996	"Du und ich" ("You and me" as Blossom)	17 (10 We.)	14 (10 We.)	—	—	—	17 (6 We.)	—	—	GER: 100.000		Herzfrequenz/Heartbeat
1996	"Bicycle Race"	28 (10 We.)	19 (11 We.)	68 (3 We.)	—	—	—	181 (1 We.)	—	GER: 50.000	Queen cover	Herzfrequenz/Heartbeat
1997	"Nur geträumt" ("Just a dream" as Blossom)	6 (11 We.)	7 (12 We.)	—	—	30 (11 We.)	12 (12 We.)	—	—	GER: 200.000	Nena cover	Verliebt.../In Love...
1997	"Verrückte Jungs"	22 (9 We.)	23 (10 We.)	—	—	—	—	—	—	GER: 60.000		Verliebt.../In Love...
1997	"Gib mir noch Zeit" ("Give me more Time" as Blossom)	9 (16 We.)	18 (13 We.)	—	—	38 (4 We.)	21 (6 We.)	—	—	GER: 250.000		Verliebt.../In Love...
1997	"Sesam-Jam (der, die, das)"	26 (15 We.)	36 (4 We.)	—	—	—	—	—	—	GER: 30.000	Samples Sesame Street theme	Verliebt... (Die Fanedition)
1998	"Blaue Augen"	19 (10 We.)	20 (10 We.)	—	—	—	32 (4 We.)	—	—	GER: 100.000	Ideal cover	Jasmin
1998	"Ich bin wieder hier"	12 (10 We.)	30 (10 We.)	—	—	28 (10 We.)	20 (6 We.)	—	—	GER: 120.000	Rozalla cover	Jasmin
1998	"Es ist vorbei"	24 (10 We.)	33 (6 We.)	—	—	—	47 (1 We.)	—	—	GER: 60.000		Jasmin
1999	"Tu es mon île" (with Yta Farrow)	—	—	—	—	—	—	—	48 (7 We.)		French version of "Du bist die Insel"	Jasmin (Die Fanedition)
1999	"Heut' ist mein Tag"	15 (8 We.)	23 (2 We.)	—	1 (14 We.)	10 (21 We.)	31 (2 We.)	—	—	GER: 150.000 SWE: 15.000	Roh cover	Jasmin (Die Fanedition)
1999	"Unter'm Weihnachtsbaum"	31 (4 We.)	—	—	—	23 (11 We.)	—	—	—	GER: 15.000		Live in Berlin
2000	"Ist deine Liebe echt?"	24 (9 We.)	—	—	—	32 (5 We.)	81 (3 We.)	—	—	GER: 50.000		Die Welt gehört dir
2000	"Die Welt gehört mir"	96 (1 We.)	—	—	—	—	—	—	—			Die Welt gehört dir
2000	"Es ist nie vorbei"	—	—	—	—	28 (9 We.)	—	—	—		Duet with E-Type	Für Immer und Ewig
2000	"Ich vermisse dich"	50 (7 We.)	66 (3 We.)	—	—	—	—	—	—	GER: 10.000		Die Welt gehört dir
2003	"Leb deinen Traum" (as Jasmin Wagner)	24 (8 We.)	52 (6 We.)	—	—	—	—	—	—	GER: 25.000		Single only
2004	"Helden wie wir" (as Jasmin Wagner)	68 (2 We.)	—	—	—	—	—	—	—			Single only
2006	"Männer brauchen Liebe" (as Jasmin Wagner)	99 (1 We.)	—	—	—	—	—	—	—			Die Versuchung
2019	"Computerliebe"	—	—	—	—	—	—	—	—		Paso Doble cover	Single only
2021	"Gold" (as Jasmin Wagner)	—	—	—	—	—	—	—	—			Von Herzen
2021	"Herzalarm" (with Finch)	7 (2 We.)	—	—	—	—	—	—	—			Rummelbums
2021	"Hauptsache Du" (as Jasmin Wagner)	—	—	—	—	—	—	—	—			Von Herzen
2022	"Regentropfen" (as Jasmin Wagner)	—	—	—	—	—	—	—	—			Von Herzen
2024	"Ravergirl"	—	—	—	—	—	—	—	—			Single only
"—" denotes a single that did not chart, or was not released in that territory.

=== As featured artist ===
List of singles as a featured artist, with selected chart positions, sales figures and certifications
Year	Single	Peak chart positions			Album
Year	Single	GER	AUT	SWI	Album
1998	"Let the Music Heal Your Soul" (as part of the supergroup Bravo All Stars)	6	22	5	Bravo – The Hits 98
2001	"Die Stadt mit der Nase im Wind" (as part of the supergroup Hamburg Allstars)	—	—	—	Single only
2010	"You'll Never Walk Alone" (as part of the supergroup Hamburg Allstars)	—	—	—	Single only
2019	"(You Made the) Summer Go Away" (David Hasselhoff feat. Blümchen)	—	—	—	Single only
2021	"Das Lied über mich" (Volker Rosin feat. Blümchen)	—	—	—	Lasst uns Freunde sein
2022	"Die 90er" (Stereoact feat. Jasmin Wagner aka Blümchen)	—	—	—	100 %
2022	"Luv with U" (DJane Housekat, Blümchen & Kyanu)	—	—	—	Single only
2023	"Herz an Herz (HBz Remix)" (HBz, Blümchen, Jasmin Wagner)	—	—	—	Single only
2023	"SOS" (Domiziana feat. Blümchen)	—	—	—	Single only
2024	"Bassface" (Lizot, Pazoo, Blümchen)	—	—	—	Single only
"—" denotes a single that did not chart, or was not released in that territory.

=== Promotional singles ===
Year	Single	Peak chart positions		Information	Album
Year	Single	GER	SWE	Information	Album
1997	"Key to Paradise" (as Blossom)	—	—	English version of "Du bist die Insel"	In Love... (Southeast Asian Edition)
2001	"Santa Claus Is Comin' to Town" (as Jasmin)	—	—	Eddie Cantor cover	Bravo Christmas
2001	"Are you Ready for some Darkness" (as Denim Girl with Bela B.)	—	—	Turbonegro cover	Alpha Motherfuckers
2006	"Komm schon werd' wütend" (as Jasmin Wagner) (Note: "Komm schon werd' wütend" has been released as a double A-side alongside "Morgen, wenn ich weg bin".)	—	—		Die Versuchung
2006	"Morgen, wenn ich weg bin" (as Jasmin Wagner) (Note: "Morgen, wenn ich weg bin" has been released as a double A-side alongside "Komm schon werd' wütend".)	—	—		Die Versuchung
2010	"Boomerang" (1996 Version) (Note: Boomerang re-charted on April 30, 2010 based on downloads alone, in an effort to prevent the 2010 'Deutschland sucht den Superstar' winner from reaching the top spot. A 2-track CD Single was subsequently released on April 30, 2010.)	7 (3 We.)	—		Best Of
2019	"Herz An Herz (Marquess Remix)" (feat. Ray Kuba)	—	—		Single only
2021	"Spring in mein Herz" (as Jasmin Wagner)	—	—		Von Herzen
2023	"La-La-Lass Mich"	—	—	Cooperation with Bumble	Single only
2023	"Volles Haus" (as Jasmin Wagner)	—	—	"Volles Haus" Theme Song	Single only
"—" denotes a promotional single that did not chart, or was not released in that territory.

=== Other appearances ===
Year	Song	Information	Album
1996	"We are the Champions" (as part of the supergroup Acts United)	Queen cover	Queen Dance Traxx I
2004	"Der kleine Stern" (as Jasmin Wagner)	Ciro Dammicco cover	Your Stars for Christmas
2004	"The Love of my Life" (as Jasmin Wagner)		7 Zwerge – Männer allein im Wald
2004	"Hopelessly Devoted to You" (as Jasmin Wagner)	Olivia Newton-John cover	Best of Mania
2008	"Bis ans Ende der Welt" (as Jasmin Wagner with Dietmar Loeffler)		Männerbeschaffungsmaßnahmen
2010	"Check Eins" (as Jasmin Wagner)	"Check Eins" Theme Song	Song only
2011	"Oh, dieser Sound" (as Jasmin Wagner)	Superpunk cover	Superpunk
2014	"Küss mich" (Wise Guys feat. Jasmin Wagner)		Achterbahn
2021	"C-Promi Himmel" (MC Fitti feat. Blümchen)		Grafitti
2022	"Vogelhochzeit" (as Jasmin Wagner)		Giraffenaffen 7

== Video albums ==
Title	Album details
The Videos '95 - '98	Released: 1998 (GER); Label: Control; Formats: VHS
Best Of	Released: 2003 (GER); Label: Edel; Formats: DVD

== Music videos ==
Year	Title	Director(s)
1995	"Herz an Herz"	Basil Schlegel
1996	"Kleiner Satellit (Piep, Piep)"	Basil Schlegel
1996	"Boomerang"	Oliver Sommer
1996	"Du und ich"	Oliver Sommer
1996	"Bicycle Race"	
1997	"Nur geträumt"	
1997	"Verrückte Jungs"	
1997	"Gib mir noch Zeit"	Axel Baur
1997	"Sesam-Jam (der, die, das)"	Oliver Sommer
1998	"Blaue Augen"	
1998	"Ich bin wieder hier"	
1998	"Es ist vorbei"	Robert Bröllochs
1999	"Heut' ist mein Tag"	
1999	"Unter'm Weihnachtsbaum"	
2000	"Ist deine Liebe echt?"	
2000	"Die Welt gehört mir"	Axel Baur
2000	"Ich vermisse dich"	
2003	"Leb deinen Traum" (as Jasmin Wagner)	Ralf Strathmann
2004	"Helden wie Wir" (as Jasmin Wagner)	Robert Bröllochs
2004	"The Love of my Life" (as Jasmin Wagner)	Sven Unterwaldt
2006	"Männer brauchen Liebe" (as Jasmin Wagner)	
2019	"Computerliebe"	Jirco Lindemann
2021	"Gold" (as Jasmin Wagner)	Oliver Sommer
2021	"Herzalarm" (with Finch)	Philip Herbort
2021	"Spring in mein Herz" (as Jasmin Wagner)	
2021	"Hauptsache Du" (as Jasmin Wagner)	Oliver Sommer
2021	"Lass los" (as Jasmin Wagner)	
2022	"Regentropfen" (as Jasmin Wagner)	Ava Studios
2023	"La-La-Lass Mich"	
2024	"Ravergirl"	Katja Kuhl

=== Featured music videos ===
Year	Title	Director(s)
1998	"Let the Music Heal Your Soul" (as part of the supergroup Bravo All Stars)	
2019	"(You made the) Summer go Away" (David Hasselhoff feat. Blümchen)	Reza Norifarahani
2020	"Heart to Heart" (Phil The Beat) (Note: Jasmin Wagner makes a guest appearance in the music video. She's listed as a special guest in the end credits.)	Smack Talk
2021	"Das Lied über mich" (Volker Rosin feat. Blümchen)	
2022	"Die 90er" (Stereoact feat. Jasmin Wagner aka Blümchen)	
2022	"Luv with U" (DJane Housekat, Blümchen & Kyanu)	
2023	"Herz an Herz (HBz Remix)" (HBz, Blümchen, Jasmin Wagner)	
2023	"SOS" (Domiziana feat. Blümchen)	Adam Munnings
2024	"Bassface" (Lizot, Pazoo, Blümchen)	
