= Through Your Eyes: Kevin Kern Collection =

Compilation album by Kevin Kern
- Released: August 2002
- Recorded: 1996–2002
- Genre: New-age, instrumental
- Length: 68:04
- Label: Real Music
- Producer: Terence Yallop, Kevin Kern

Kevin Kern chronology
More Than Words: The Best of Kevin Kern (2002)	Through Your Eyes: Kevin Kern Collection (2002)

Through Your Eyes: Kevin Kern Collection, or simply Through Your Eyes or Kevin Kern Collection, is a compilation album from American new-age pianist Kevin Kern, released in Japan only in 2002.

As with his preceding and succeeding albums, it is an album of instrumental songs. The compilation contains the two new compositions used in his worldwide compilation More Than Words, plus tracks from his five studio albums, some of which appeared in More Than Words.

== Track listing ==
No.	Title	Writer(s)	Originally from	Length
1.	"Through the Arbor"	Kevin Kern	In the Enchanted Garden	3:46
2.	"The Enchanted Garden"	Kevin Kern	In the Enchanted Garden	6:54
3.	"Through Your Eyes"	Kevin Kern	Embracing the Wind	3:49
4.	"Where Paths Meet"	Kevin Kern	Beyond the Sundial	5:15
5.	"To Sleep on Angels' Wings"	Kevin Kern	In My Life	4:30
6.	"Le Jardin"	Kevin Kern	Summer Daydreams	4:52
7.	"Until Tomorrow"	Kevin Kern	Beyond the Sundial	5:31
8.	"Summer Daydreams"	Kevin Kern	Summer Daydreams	5:19
9.	"Childhood Remembered"	Kevin Kern	Embracing the Wind	4:31
10.	"Above the Clouds"	Kevin Kern	Embracing the Wind	5:25
11.	"Touch the Sky"	Kevin Kern	In My Life	4:48
12.	"After the Rain"	Kevin Kern	In the Enchanted Garden	4:06
13.	"Out of the Darkness into the Light"	Kevin Kern	Freedom to Love	4:16
14.	"Children at Play"	Kevin Kern	More Than Words: The Best of Kevin Kern	5:07

== Personnel ==
- Kevin Kern – Piano, Keyboards, Producer
- Jeff Linsky – Guitar
- Terence Yallop – Executive Producer
