= Never Stop That Feeling =

Studio album by Mark 'Oh
- Released: 1995
- Recorded: 1993–1995
- Label: Peace Records, Urban
- Producer: Albrecht (tracks: 1 to 3, 5 to 9); Schöttler (tracks: 1, 2, 5, 6); Bokoe (tracks: 10); Scheiker (tracks: 3, 7 to 9)

Mark 'Oh chronology
| Never Stop That Feeling (1995) | Magic Power (1996) |

Singles from Never Stop That Feeling
- 1. "Randy (Never Stop That Feeling)" Released: 1993; 2. "Love Song" Released: 1994; 3. "Tears Don't Lie" Released: 1994

Never Stop That Feeling is the debut album released by the German DJ, Mark 'Oh in 1995, by Peace Records.

== Track listing ==
| No. | Title | Length |
|---|---|---|
| 1. | "Oh" (Intro) | 1:23 |
| 2. | "Love Song" (Long Version) | 5:08 |
| 3. | "Dreaming Of You" (U.R.R. Mix) | 5:25 |
| 4. | "Tears Don't Lie" (Long Version) | 4:58 |
| 5. | "You Want More?" (U.R.R. Mix) | 4:00 |
| 6. | "Let's Do It Again" | 4:03 |
| 7. | "Can You Feel The Rhythm?" (U.R.R. Mix) | 4:39 |
| 8. | "Friendship" (U.R.R. Mix) | 4:31 |
| 9. | "How Do I Love You?" (U.R.R. Mix) | 4:30 |
| 10. | "Randy (Never Stop That Feeling)" (Original Mix) | 4:58 |

== Album credits ==
All songs on Never Stop That Feeling are produced by Albrecht, Schöttler, Bokoe, Scheiker

- Oh (Intro)
  - Written By: Albrecht, Schöttler
- Love Song (Long Version)
  - Written By: Albrecht, Schöttler
- Dreaming Of You (U.R.R.Mix)
  - Written By: Albrecht, Scheiker
- Tears Don't Lie (Long Version)
  - Music By: Mark 'Oh, Dario Baldan Bembo, Ciro Dammicco
  - Words By: Mark 'Oh, Francesco Speccia, Alberto Salerno, Maurizio Seymandi
    - This song is a cover of "Soleado", also known as "When a Child is Born".
- You Want More? (U.R.R.Mix)
  - Written By: Albrecht, Schöttler
- Let's Do It Again
  - Written By: Albrecht, Schöttler
- Can You Feel The Rhythm? (U.R.R.Mix)
  - Written By: Albrecht, Scheiker
- Friendship (U.R.R.Mix)
  - Written By: Albrecht, Scheiker
- How Do I Love You? (U.R.R.Mix)
  - Written By: Albrecht, Scheiker
- Randy (Never Stop That Feeling) (Original Mix)
  - Written By: Albrecht, Gery Bokoe

== Charts ==
=== Weekly charts ===
Weekly chart performance for Never Stop That Feeling
| Chart (1995) | Peak position |
|---|---|
| Hungarian Albums (MAHASZ) | 21 |
