= More Than Words (disambiguation) =

"More Than Words" is a 1991 ballad written and originally performed by the rock band Extreme.

More Than Words may also refer to:

- More Than Words (Mark 'Oh album) released 2004
- More Than Words: The Best of Kevin Kern an album by Kevin Kern
- More Than Words (Brian McKnight album) released 2013
- "More Than Words" (Maaya Sakamoto song), 2012
- More Than Words (TV series) a 2014 Philippine TV series
- "More than Words", a 2018 song by Little Mix featuring Kamille from LM5
- "more than words", a 2023 song by Hitsujibungaku

== See also ==
- "More Than Words Can Say", a 1990 song by Alias
- More Than Words Can Say (album), a 2006 album by Stevie Holland
