= Endless Blue Sky =

Studio album by Kevin Kern
- Released: January 27, 2009
- Recorded: 2008
- Genre: New-age, instrumental
- Length: 61:18 (Asian)
- Label: Real Music
- Producer: Terence Yallop, Kevin Kern

Kevin Kern chronology
Imagination's Light (2005)	Endless Blue Sky (2009)	Enchanted Piano (2011)

Endless Blue Sky is the eighth studio album from American new-age pianist Kevin Kern. As with his preceding albums, it is an album of instrumental songs. It was released on January 27, 2009.

It is his first album to include the concept of bonus tracks, the Asian version having one, a cover of Jay Chou's "A Thousand Miles Away" (千里之外). It is also his first studio album to exceed eleven tracks, and the first studio album to exceed an hour in length (for the Asian edition) - previously, only his compilation albums were over an hour long.

== Track listing ==
All tracks composed and arranged by Kevin Kern except #11, written by Jay Chou.

1. "Joy of the Journey" – 3:18
2. "Velvet Green" – 3:52
3. "Endless Blue Sky" – 6:29
4. "Sunset Prayer" – 2:52
5. "Light Spirit" – 4:23
6. "Scene in a Dream" – 4:54
7. "The Skipping Song" – 4:44
8. "Caring Friend" – 5:00
9. "Wending Our Way Home" – 4:31
10. "The Glistening Pond" – 5:16
11. "A Thousand Miles Away" – 4:50 (Asian bonus track)
12. "Gifts Along the Way" – 3:54
13. "Joy of the Journey" (Reprise) – 1:58
14. "Always Near" – 5:19

== Personnel ==
- Kevin Kern – piano, keyboards, producer
- Dean Magraw - acoustic guitar
- Jill Olson - violin
- Rebecca Arons - cello
- Gordon Johnson - acoustic and electric bass
- Richard Laeton - art director
