= Jasmin Wagner =

German singer (born 1980)

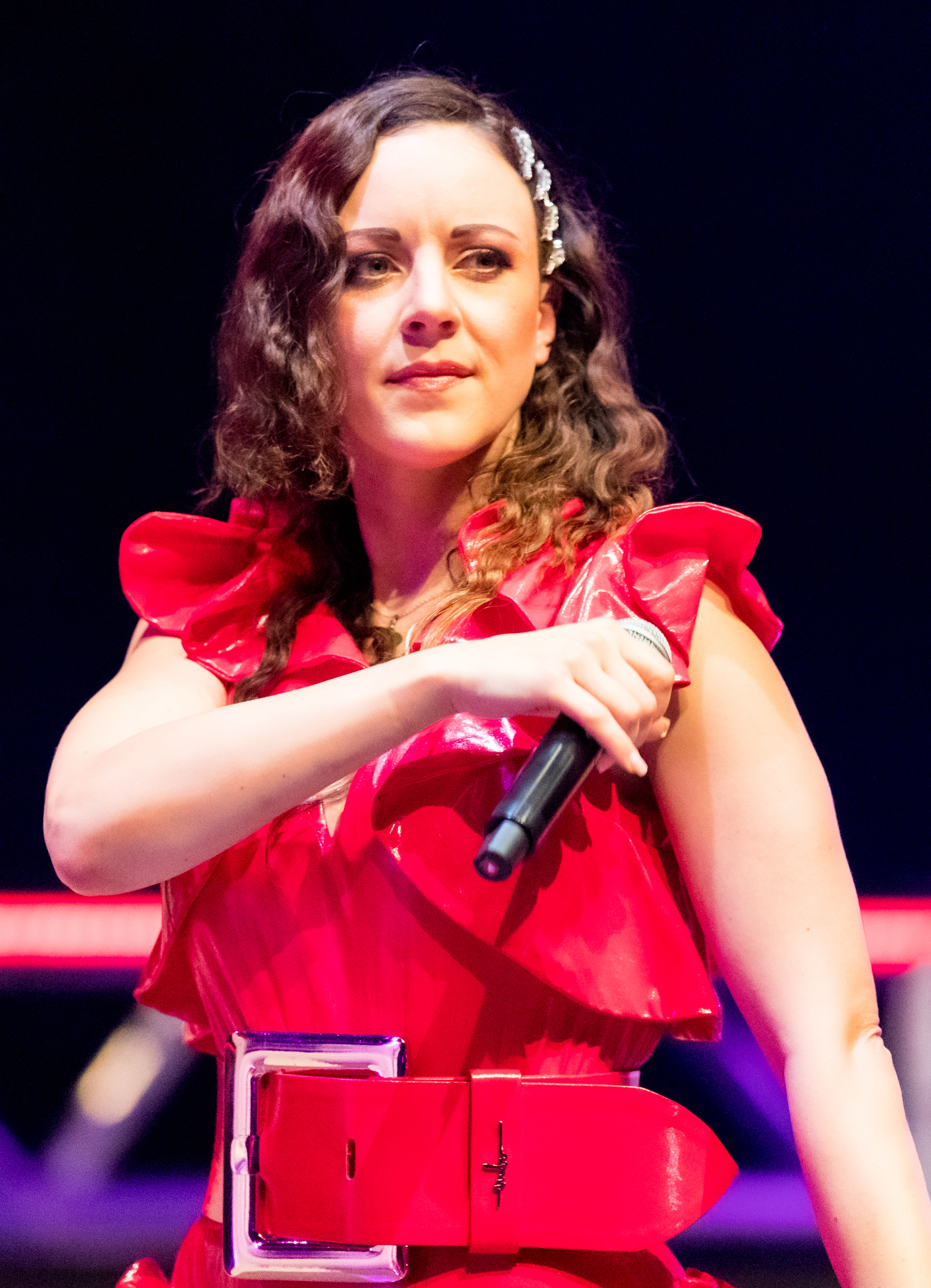
- Wagner performing at Sunshine Live in Germany, 2019

Background information
- Also known as: Blümchen; Blossom; Denim Girl; Jasmin
- Born: 20 April 1980 (age 46); Hamburg, West Germany
- Genres: Pop; dance; happy hardcore; schlager
- Occupation: Singer
- Years active: 1995–2025
- Labels: Edel; Neues Gefühl; Polydor; Wunderkind

Jasmin Wagner (pronounced [jasˈmiːn ˈvaːɡnɐ]; born April 20, 1980), better known as Blümchen (pronounced [ˈblyːmçən]), is a German pop and dance music singer. While she releases her English-language albums under the name Blossom, her German stage name, Blümchen, translates to "floret" or "small flower."

== Early life ==
Born in Hamburg, West Germany, to a German father and a Croatian mother, she began performing as a cheerleader for the Hamburg Blue Angels, a squad affiliated with the Hamburg Blue Devils American football team.

== Career ==
=== 1995–1996: Career beginnings and Herzfrequenz ===
In 1995, at the age of 15, she began her musical career under the name Blümchen. She became the most successful German female singer of the 1990s. She also released singles and albums in other German-speaking countries, Scandinavia, and Asia.

Her debut studio album, Herzfrequenz, was released in 1996, following the success of the chart hit "Herz an Herz," a cover of a Paso Doble song. This was followed by the singles "Kleiner Satellit (Piep, Piep)", "Boomerang", and "Du und ich," all of which became chart successes. In 1996, Wagner released her first English-language single, a cover of the Queen song "Bicycle Race," which was the only single released under both the names Blümchen and Blossom. This release paved the way for her international career as Blossom, including the studio album Heartbeat, the English counterpart to Herzfrequenz. The album featured English versions of "Herz an Herz" and "Du und ich," released as the singles "Heart to Heart" and "You and Me," respectively. "Bicycle Race" was also included on the Queen tribute compilation album Queen Dance Traxx I, which featured an ensemble cast song credited as Acts United, "We Are the Champions."

=== 1997–1998: Verliebt... and Jasmin ===
In 1997, Wagner released her second studio album, Verliebt..., along with its English-language counterpart, In Love..., under the name Blossom. Singles from Verliebt... included the Nena cover "Nur geträumt," "Verrückte Jungs," and "Gib mir noch Zeit" (released as "Just a Dream" and "Give Me More Time" as Blossom). Later, the album Verliebt... was reissued under the subtitle "Die Fanedition" with reworked cover art, a bonus medley, and a new song, the single "Sesam-Jam (der, die, das)," which sampled the German version of the Sesame Street theme.

In 1998, Wagner released her eponymous third studio album, Jasmin, which featured the singles "Blaue Augen," the Ideal cover "Ich bin wieder hier" (a Rozalla cover), and "Es ist vorbei." The album marked a shift from her earlier happy hardcore style to a more pop and dance-oriented sound. That same year, she contributed to the charity single "Let the Music Heal Your Soul" as part of the supergroup Bravo All Stars.

=== 1999–2000: Live in Berlin and Die Welt gehört dir ===
In 1999, the album Jasmin was re-released with updated cover art and two additional songs: the singles "Heut' ist mein Tag" and "Tu es mon île," a French-language version of "Du bist die Insel," which had originally appeared on the Verliebt... album. That same year, Wagner released her first and only live album, Live in Berlin, which included a previously unreleased track, the Christmas single "Unter'm Weihnachtsbaum."

In 2000, Wagner released her fourth studio album, Die Welt gehört dir, featuring the singles "Ist deine Liebe echt?," "Die Welt gehört mir," and "Ich vermisse dich." The latter served as her farewell single as Blümchen, marking the conclusion of this chapter in her career.

=== 2001–2002: Für immer und ewig and films ===
Before Wagner retired the Blümchen moniker, the greatest hits compilation album Für immer und ewig was released, featuring a previously unreleased song, the promotional single "Es ist nie vorbei," which included a collaboration with Swedish artist E-Type. Wagner also participated in the 2001 charity single "Die Stadt mit der Nase im Wind" as part of the supergroup Hamburg Allstars.

In the same year, she appeared on the Norwegian rock band Turbonegro's tribute album, Alpha Motherfuckers, performing the song "Are You Ready for Some Darkness" alongside Die Ärzte member Bela B. For this project, which marked a significant shift from her electronic sound to an independent rock style, Wagner adopted the stage name Denim Girl for the first and only time.

Later that year, Wagner released her first and only promotional single under the mononym Jasmin, a cover of "Santa Claus Is Comin' to Town," originally performed by Eddie Cantor. This Christmas song was exclusively available at Tchibo stores.

Wagner also ventured into acting, making cameo appearances in several films, most notably as a race car fan in the 2001 movie Driven, starring Sylvester Stallone.

=== 2003–2007: Singles and Die Versuchung ===
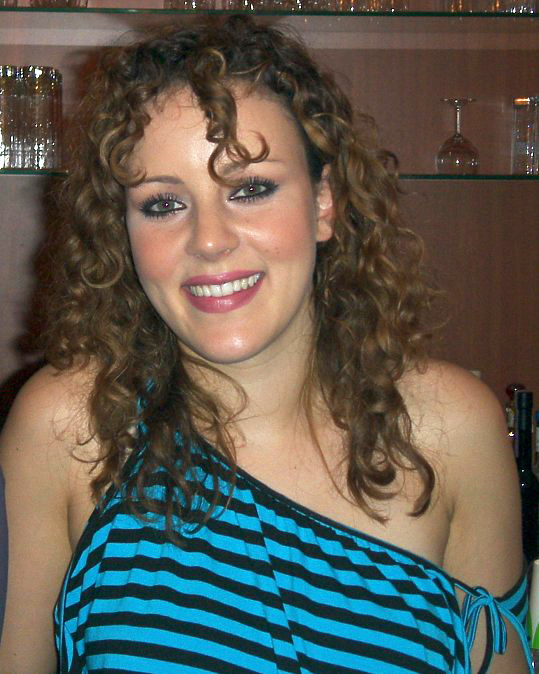
Wagner in 2004

After a brief hiatus from the music industry, Wagner returned in 2003 with a new record deal on Polydor under her real name, Jasmin Wagner, releasing the single "Leb deinen Traum" for her upcoming fifth studio album. The song achieved moderate success, peaking at #24 on the German Singles Chart, and served as the theme song for the talent show Popstars – Das Duell. For her transition to a more mature pop-rock sound, Wagner collaborated with notable German artists and songwriters, including Inga Humpe, Peter Plate, and Uwe Fahrenkrog-Petersen. In 2004, she followed up with the single "Helden wie wir," written by Plate.

That same year, Wagner performed these singles along with other new tracks, such as "Erster Tag," "Sonne in mir," "Schmetterling," "Lieblingslied," and "Hellwach," at the Happy Family event in Mannheim. Additional songs she presented included "Wann wenn nicht jetzt," "Frei," and "Das Meer ruft meinen Namen" at a concert in Oldenburg. However, after delays in the album's release and dissatisfaction with its direction, Wagner ultimately decided to cancel her untitled studio album. Despite this, the studio recording of "Schmetterling" was leaked online.

In 2004, Wagner appeared on several compilation albums, including Best of Mania with the Olivia Newton-John cover "Hopelessly Devoted to You" and Your Stars for Christmas with "Der kleine Stern," a German-language Ciro Dammicco cover of "Soleado." Additionally, she performed the title song "The Love of My Life" for the motion picture soundtrack of 7 Zwerge – Männer allein im Wald.

In 2005, still signed with Polydor, Wagner released her first and only studio album as Jasmin Wagner, Die Versuchung. The album showcased a chanson, swing, and retro 1960s pop sound. It included the single "Männer brauchen Liebe" and the double A-side single "Komm schon werd' wütend" and "Morgen, wenn ich weg bin." Despite its artistic ambition, the album was commercially unsuccessful, remaining on the German Album Charts for only five weeks, leading to Wagner's departure from Polydor.

In 2007, Wagner appeared as Maxi in the gangster-comedy film Breathful.

=== 2008–2018: Theatre work and collaborations ===
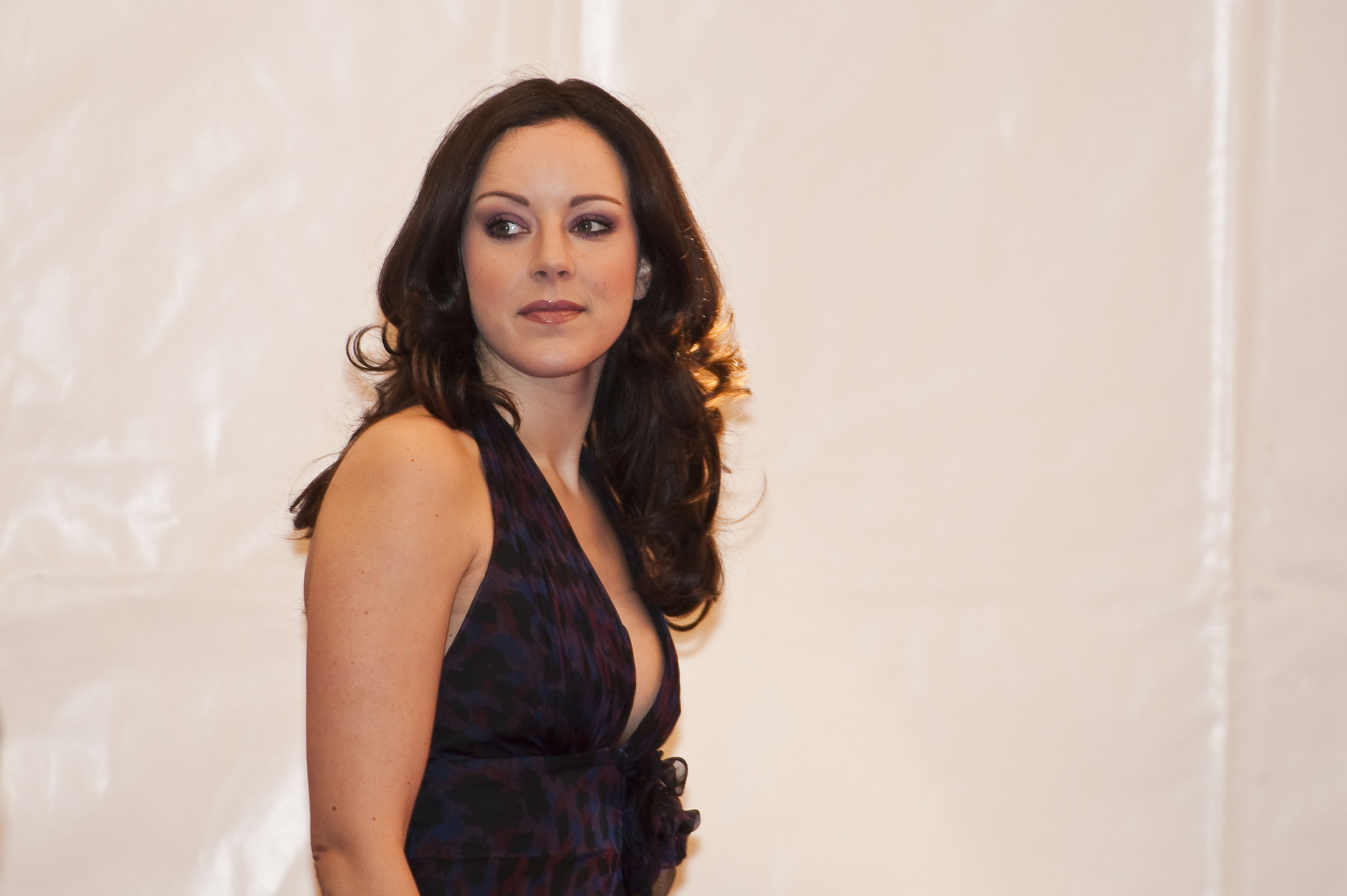
Wagner at the Berlin Film Festival in 2010

Wagner appeared in several theater productions and contributed vocals to their soundtracks. Among these was the song "Bis ans Ende der Welt," recorded in 2008 with Dietmar Loeffler for the album Männerbeschaffungsmaßnahmen. In 2010, Wagner reunited with the supergroup Hamburg Allstars for another charity single, "You'll Never Walk Alone", and also recorded the "Check Eins" theme song for the broadcaster ARD.

Her song "Boomerang" (1996) became part of an Internet campaign in early 2010 against Deutschland sucht den Superstar, the German version of Pop Idol. The campaign aimed to prevent the winner Mehrzad Marashi's debut single, "Don't Believe", from reaching the top of the charts. As part of the campaign, "Boomerang" was purchased online in large numbers, ultimately reaching number 7 on the charts, surpassing its original 1996 peak of number 11. However, it did not surpass "Don't Believe," which remained at number 1. This achievement marked "Boomerang" as Wagner's fifth top-ten single, over a decade after its release. The campaign was likely inspired by a similar effort in the United Kingdom against The X Factor, where "Killing in the Name" by Rage Against the Machine became the Christmas number one in 2009.

In 2011, Wagner recorded the song "Oh, dieser Sound," a cover of a song by Superpunk, for a Superpunk tribute compilation album. She also starred in the 2011 play "Alexandra – Glück und Verhängnis eines Stars," about the life of the German singer Alexandra. Her role as the lead character resulted in the release of a soundtrack tribute album in 2012, distributed exclusively through Reader's Digest. In 2014, she appeared as a featured artist on the Wise Guys song "Küss mich," which was included on their studio album Achterbahn. This collaboration marked the last time Wagner was credited as Jasmin Wagner before resuming her Blümchen persona in 2019.

=== 2019–2024: Blümchen comeback and new record deals ===
In 2019, after a hiatus, Wagner returned as Blümchen and released her first new single, "Computerliebe", a cover of the Paso Doble song. Later that year, Wagner re-recorded a new version of her debut single, "Herz an Herz," with Ray Kuba, which was remixed by the band Marquess. For this release, she recorded the verses from the original Paso Doble version, which had been absent in the 1995 release. She also collaborated with David Hasselhoff on the 2019 single "(You Made the) Summer Go Away".

Wagner made her first comeback performance as Blümchen in March 2019 in front of 60,000 people at the Veltins Arena in Gelsenkirchen, Germany. The return as Blümchen proved to be highly in demand, as tour dates quickly accumulated, leading Jasmin to perform at 22 additional concerts in Germany throughout 2019.

In 2020, Wagner signed a new record deal with the German label Schubert Music. She recorded her new album, Von Herzen, which was released on 23 July 2021 under her real name, Jasmin Wagner. The album introduced her "new electro-schlager sound," combined with a "modern, danceable schlager sound," according to a label spokesman. The album reached number 6 on Germany's official Top 100 Album Chart.

The first single from Von Herzen was the song "Gold," released on 20 April 2021. The song achieved moderate success, reaching number 42 on Germany's official Singles Download Chart and number 10 on the Schlager Charts. A duet with rapper FiNCH, titled "Herzalarm," was announced, with its release scheduled for 25 June 2021. The track became a top-10 hit for both artists, reaching number 7 on Germany's Official Singles Chart. This marked Wagner's highest chart placement on the German Singles Chart since her song "Boomerang" re-entered the chart at number 7 in 2010. The success of "Herzalarm" also earned Wagner a new chart record, making her one of the few German solo female artists (along with Nena) to have top-40 hits in four consecutive decades. After 14 of Wagner's singles reached the top 40 in the 1990s, 2 singles ("Ist Deine Liebe Echt?", "Leb Deinen Traum") in the early 2000s, and "Boomerang" at number 7 in 2010, "Herzalarm" became her 18th top-40 entry on the German Singles Chart.

Additional tour dates were also announced for 2021, including two concerts in Sweden and one in Norway, where Wagner had a number-one hit on the singles chart with her song "Heut' Ist Mein Tag" in 1999.

Blümchen performed at 40 tour dates throughout Europe in 2022, finishing in September at the 90s Super Show in Vienna. She went into parental leave until May 2023 and she continued touring with 22 dates as part of the School of Rave tour. For the first time, she performed on an AIDA cruise ship. Two singles, SOS (with Dominizana) and La-La-Lass Mich were released in August and September 2023.

Her single Ravergirl was released on 15 March 2024 following the announcement of a new contract with Virgin Records. Festival performances in the summer season included Deichbrand and the final edition of Melt!. For the songs Bassface and Liebe auf den ersten Beat, she collaborated with DJs Pazoo and Lizot.

=== 2025: 30th anniversary tour and retirement ===
In March 2025, Blümchen announced the end of her musical career following the "30th anniversary" tour. The tour contained 13 dates in Germany from May to November, the final performance took place on 29 November 2025 in Mannheim.

== Artistry ==
=== Music ===
Wagner's Blümchen and Blossom songs varied from around 50 BPM to about 200 BPM, spanning a wide range of musical genres, including dance, rave, happy hardcore, pop, and Eurodance, all mixed with simple melodies and lyrics. She also released pop ballads such as "Gib mir noch Zeit," "Es ist vorbei," and "Ich vermisse dich." Throughout her career, Wagner experimented with different genres and styles, such as 2-step ("Automatisch," "U-Bahn"), house ("Immer noch verliebt"), disco ("Ist deine Liebe echt"), reggae fusion ("(You made the) Summer go Away"), and indie rock ("Are you Ready for some Darkness"). While Wagner's albums Herzfrequenz and Verliebt... featured a similar number of happy hardcore tracks with only refrains, she shifted direction for her third and fourth albums, Jasmin and Die Welt gehört dir, embracing a softer dance-pop sound with both refrains and verses.

Wagner is also known for numerous songs and singles that are covers of other artists, including Paso Doble, Queen, Nena, Sesame Street, Ideal, Rozalla, Eddie Cantor, Ciro Dammicco, Turbonegro, Olivia Newton-John, and Superpunk. She is particularly noted for singing in multiple languages, primarily German and English, but also in French, such as the French version of "Du bist die Insel," titled "Tu es mon île," a duet with French singer Yta Farrow.

=== Public image ===
Due to her drastic shift in musical direction aside from her Blümchen sound, Wagner adopted various stage names. These included Blossom for her international Blümchen releases, Denim Girl for the indie rock song "Are you Ready for some Darkness," and her real names, Jasmin Wagner or simply Jasmin, for her recent works, such as the 60s-inspired sound of Die Versuchung.

== Personal life ==
For four years, Wagner was in a relationship with Lucas Cordalis. In 2015, she married Swiss entrepreneur Frank Sippel. She divorced Sippel in 2020. In November 2022, she welcomed her first child, a daughter, with her partner.

== Discography ==
- Herzfrequenz/Heartbeat (1996)
- Verliebt.../In Love... (1997)
- Jasmin (1998)
- Die Welt gehört dir (2000)
- Die Versuchung (2006)
- Von Herzen (2021)

== Filmography ==
=== Films ===
- 2001: Driven – as Ingrid
- 2003: Operation Dance Sensation – as Schwester Stefanie
- 2007: Breathful – as Maxi
- 2007: Eis für Anfänger – as Anna
- 2020: Kartoffelsalat 3 - Das Musical – as Frau Schmidt

=== Series ===
- 1998: Sesamstraße – episode "1852", as Blümchen
- 2009: Hallo Robbie! – episode "Schwarze Schafe", as Heike
- 2011: SOKO München – episode "Unter die Haut", as Fabia Winter
- 2011: Notruf Hafenkante – episode "Männer sind Schweine", as Anna Güttel
- 2017: Nord Nord Mord – episode "Clüver und der König von Sylt", as Radio reporter
- 2018: Polizeiruf 110 – episode "Crash", as Blümchen

=== Voice-over ===
- 2006: Tony Tough 2: A Rake's Progress – as Cornelia Cook

== Awards ==
1996

- RSH Gold "Best Singer"
- Bravo Gold Otto
- Popcorn Award "Best Singer"
- Pop/Rocky Award

1997

- ECHO Award "Best National Artist"
- RSH Gold
- Bravo Gold Otto (multiple categories)
- Popcorn Award (beating artist Mariah Carey)
- Pop/Rocky Schlumf Award (narrowly beating artist Toni Braxton)
- Goldene Stimmgabel in category "Disco/Dance Music"
- VIVA Awards (Nominee)

1998

- ZDF Golden Tuning Fork
- Bravo Gold Otto (multiple categories)
- Pop/Rocky Schlumf Gold Award
- RSH Gold Award

1999

- ZDF Golden Tuning Fork (Nominee)
- VIVA Awards (Nominee)
- ENERGY Award (Sweden)
- Bravo Silver Otto "Best Singer"
- Echo Award

2000

- Bravo Bronze Otto
- Popcorn Bronze Award

2003

- Maxim Woman of the Year
