= Tears Don't Lie =

1994 single by Mark 'Oh

Single by Mark 'Oh

from the album Never Stop That Feeling
- Released: 1994
- Genre: Happy hardcore; techno
- Length: 3:34
- Label: Peace; Urban
- Songwriters: Baldan-Bembo; Dammicco; Specchia; Seymandi
- Producers: Marko Albrecht; Holger Scheiker

Mark 'Oh singles chronology
"Love Song" (1994)	"Tears Don't Lie" (1994)	"Droste, Hörst Du Mich?" (1995)

Music video
- "Tears Don't Lie" on YouTube

"Tears Don't Lie" is a song by German DJ Mark 'Oh, released in late 1994 by Peace and Urban Records as the third single from his debut album, Never Stop That Feeling (1995). The song is based on the 1974 melody Soleado by Ciro Dammicco (and its German remake, Tränen lügen nicht, meaning Tears Don't Lie) and was produced by Albrecht with Holger Scheiker. It uses the same melody best known in English-speaking countries as "When a Child is Born".

"Tears Don't Lie" peaked at number one in Austria, Germany and Sweden and was a top-10 hit across the rest of Europe. It was also nominated for the 1996 Echo Awards for the best German dance single. Matt Broadley directed the accompanying music video for the song. In 2002, the song was released in a new version, as "Tears Don't Lie 2002", peaking at numbers 35 and 36 in Germany and Austria, respectively.

== Critical reception ==
Alan Jones from Music Week wrote, "The oddest single of the week has to be Mark 'Oh's 'Tears Don't Lie', which starts with some fairly ambient synth work before turning into a very fast techno track, overlaid with the humming melody from 'When a Child is Born'. Already making its ascent of RM's On a Pop Tip chart, it's so unusual it can't help but attract attention and seems destined to maintain the Systematic label's 100% strike rate."

James Hyman from the RM Dance Update gave it a score of four out of five, saying, "Using Johnny Mathis 'When a Child is Born' theme, the Euro stomper adds its 140bpm-plus breakbeats, sped-up 'tears don't lie' bytes and great melodic breakdowns to great commercial effect." Another RM editor, James Hamilton, named it a "insanely infectious German novelty". In April 1995, Smash Hits predicted that "Tears Don't Lie" would be a future hit, writing, "They're calling it the next 'Saturday Night' — a record by an unknown European that comes from nowhere straight into the charts. [...] You'll either find it the most annoying thing ever or you'll love it. Either way, it's going to be a massive hit!"

== Chart performance ==
"Tears Don't Lie" peaked at number one in at least three countries: Austria (5 weeks), Germany (3 weeks), and Sweden (2 weeks). The song was also a top-10 hit in Denmark, Finland, Flanders, Ireland, the Netherlands, Norway, and Switzerland, as well as on the Eurochart Hot 100, on which it peaked at number two. In the UK, the single reached number 24 during its first week on the UK Singles Chart, on 30 April 1995, staying on the chart for three weeks. On the Record Mirror UK on a Pop Tip Club Chart, it reached number five. The song was also a top-20 hit in Wallonia. In 2002, it was released in a new version as "Tears Don't Lie 2002", peaking at numbers 35 and 36 in Germany and Austria, respectively.

== Music video ==
The music video for "Tears Don't Lie" was directed by Swedish-based director Matt Broadley. It was A-listed on German music television channel VIVA in December 1994. Two months later, the video received heavy rotation on MTV Europe.

== Track listings ==
- 12-inch single
1. "Tears Don't Lie" (12" Mix) – 4:57
2. "Tears Don't Lie" (O. Lieb Remix) – 6:17
3. "Tears Don't Lie" (Mark' Oh Remix) – 4:32
4. "Tears Don't Lie" (Hooligan Remix) – 5:29
- CD single
1. "Tears Don't Lie" (Short Mix) – 3:34
2. "Tears Don't Lie" (12" Mix) – 4:55
- CD maxi
1. "Tears Don't Lie" (12" Mix) – 4:55
2. "Ultimate" – 4:16
3. "Tears Don't Lie" (Shortmix) – 3:34
- CD maxi - Remixes
1. "Tears Don't Lie" (O.Lieb Remix) – 6:17
2. "Tears Don't Lie" (Mark' Oh Remix) – 4:36
3. "Tears Don't Lie" (Hooligan Remix) – 5:34

== Charts ==
=== Weekly charts ===
Chart (1994–1995)	Peak position
Austria (Ö3 Austria Top 40)	1
Belgium (Ultratop 50 Flanders)	2
Belgium (Ultratop 50 Wallonia)	14
Denmark (IFPI)	2
Europe (Eurochart Hot 100)	2
Europe (European Dance Radio)	3
Finland (Suomen virallinen lista)	6
Germany (GfK)	1
Ireland (IRMA)	9
Israel (Israeli Singles Chart)	5
Netherlands (Dutch Top 40)	2
Netherlands (Single Top 100)	2
Norway (VG-lista)	8
Scottish Singles Sales (Official Charts)	18
Sweden (Sverigetopplistan)	1
Switzerland (Schweizer Hitparade)	3
UK Singles (Official Charts)	24
UK Club Chart (Music Week)	68
UK Pop Tip Club Chart (Music Week)	5

Chart (2002)	Peak position
Austria (Ö3 Austria Top 40)	36
Germany (Media Control)	35

=== Year-end charts ===
Chart (1995)	Position
Austria (Ö3 Austria Top 40)	12
Belgium (Ultratop 50 Flanders)	37
Belgium (Ultratop 50 Wallonia)	40
Europe (Eurochart Hot 100)	28
Germany (Media Control)	8
Latvia (Latvijas Top 50)	52
Netherlands (Dutch Top 40)	21
Netherlands (Single Top 100)	20
Norway Winter Period (VG-lista)	13
Sweden (Topplistan)	8
Switzerland (Schweizer Hitparade)	29
UK Pop Tip Club Chart (Music Week)	45

== Certifications ==
Region	Certification	Certified units/sales
Germany (BVMI)	Platinum	850,000

== Release history ==
Region	Date	Format(s)	Label(s)	Ref.
Europe	1994	12-inch vinyl; CD	Peace; Urban	
United Kingdom	24 April 1995	12-inch vinyl; CD; cassette	Systematic	
Australia	8 May 1995	CD; cassette	Peace; Urban	
