= The Past, the Present, the Future (Mark 'Oh album) =

The Past, The Present, The Future

Studio album by Mark 'Oh
- Released: 20 November 2009
- Recorded: 2009
- Genre: Electronic, dance, electro house
- Length: 50:28
- Label: ZYX Music
- Producer: Mark 'Oh; Tobias Schlechtrimen(Tracks: 1 & 5), The OH Corporation(Tracks: 2,3,4,6,7), Mark 'Oh; Gary Bokoe(Track: 8), Mark 'Oh; Holger Scheiker(Track: 9), Mark 'Oh; Claus Hagele (Track: 10)

Mark 'Oh chronology
More Than Words (2004)	The Past, The Present, The Future (2009)

Singles from The Past, The Present, The Future
- 1. "United" Released: June 5, 2009; 2. "Scatman" Released: October 30, 2009

The Past, The Present, The Future is the sixth album released by Mark 'Oh, and it was released on November 20, 2009, by ZYX Music.

The album contains two cover songs, a cover of the song "Scatman", released by Scatman John in 1994., and a cover of "United", released by Prince Ital Joe feat Marky Mark in 1994.

The album also contains three of Mark 'Oh's old songs: Randy (Never Stop That Feeling), Mark 'Oh's first single, released in 1993., Tears Don't Lie released by Mark 'Oh in 1994., and Your Love released by Mark 'Oh in 1999.

== Track listing ==
No.	Title	Length
1.	"Scatman" (Club mix)	6:09
2.	"Don't Leave Me"	5:18
3.	"Bomb"	6:02
4.	"7 Days A Week"	5:48
5.	"United" (Single Long Version)	3:54
6.	"La La"	5:19
7.	"Flash and Thunder"	5:18
8.	"Randy (Never Stop That Feeling)"	4:58
9.	"Tears Don't Lie" (Original Short Mix)	3:34
10.	"Your Love" (Original Radio Mix)	3:38

Bonus videos
No.	Title	Length
11.	"United" (Music Video)	3:43
12.	"Scatman" (Music Video)	3:56

== Album credits ==
All songs on The Past, The Present, The Future are produced by The OH Corporation except where noted.

- Scatman (produced by Mark 'Oh and Tobias Schlechtrimen)
  - Music and Words By: John Larkin and Antonio Nunzio Catania
- Don't Leave Me
  - Vocals By: Ryan Bowden
  - Written By: The OH Corporation
- Bomb
  - Vocals By: A Girl & K-Star
  - Written By:The OH Corporation
  - Co-Produced By: Ilan Schulz
- 7 Days A Week
  - Vocals By: Another Girl
  - Written By:The OH Corporation
  - Co-Produced By: Ilan Schulz
- United (produced by Mark 'Oh and Tobias Schlechtrimen)
  - Music By: Alex Christensen, Frank Peterson
  - Lyrics By: Alex Christensen, Frank Peterson, Mark Wahlberg, Joseph Paquette
- La La
  - Vocals By: Turkey Rhubarb
  - Written By: The OH Corporation
- Flash and Thunder
  - Vocals By: Ryan Bowden
  - Written By: The OH Corporation
- Randy (Never Stop That Feeling) (produced by Mark 'Oh and Gery Bokoe)
  - Written By: Mark 'Oh and Gery Bokoe
- Tears Don't Lie (produced by Mark 'Oh and Holger Scheiker )
  - Music By: Mark 'Oh, Dario Baldan Bembo, Ciro Dammicco
  - Words By: Mark 'Oh, Francesco Speccia, Alberto Salerno, Maurizio Seymandi
- Your Love (produced by Mark 'Oh and Claus Hagele)
  - Vocals By: John Davies
  - Music By: Mark 'Oh and Claus Hagele
  - Words By: Bruce Hammond Earlam
