= Mesh (band) =

British electronic alternative band

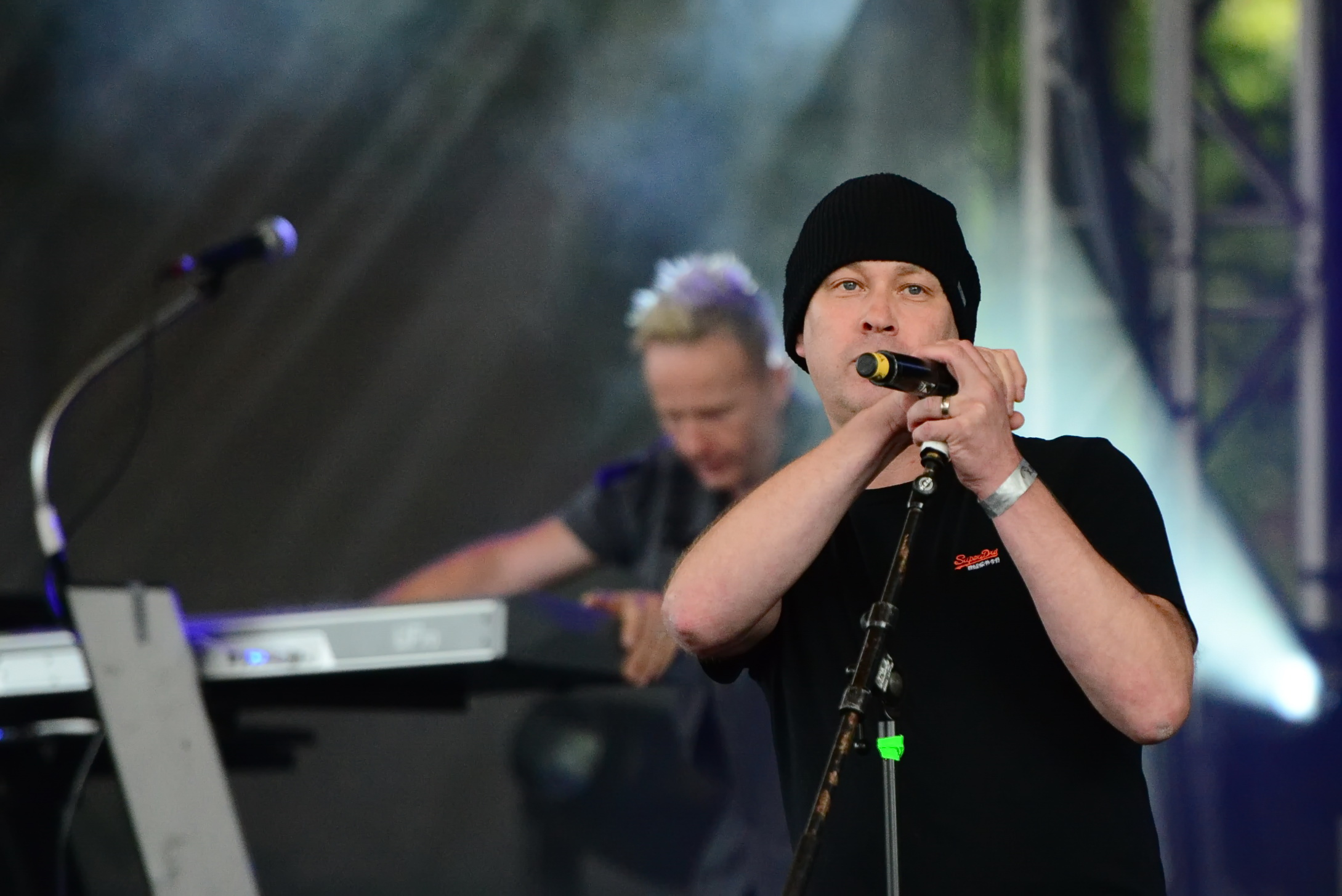
- Mesh performing in 2014

Background information
- Origin: Bristol, England
- Genres: Synth-pop; new wave; dance-rock; electronic rock; alternative rock
- Years active: 1991–present
- Labels: Dependent; Memento Materia
- Members: Mark Hockings; Richard Silverthorn
- Past members: Neil Taylor
- Website: mesh.co.uk

Mesh are a British electronic alternative band from Bristol, England.

== Biography ==
Mesh formed in 1991 after lead singer Mark Hockings and Richard Silverthorn (keyboards) met each other at a concert where Silverthorn's band was playing. Their shared influences included Yazoo, OMD, Depeche Mode, D.A.F. and Front 242. Soon afterwards, Neil Taylor – Silverthorn's former bandmate – joined the group on keyboards, introducing influences like the KLF and dance music. The creative writing was split between Silverthorn, who composes the music, and Hockings, who writes the lyrics.

Mesh were signed by the Swedish label Memento Materia and an EP, Fragile, was released in 1994.

This was followed by a full album, In This Place Forever, in 1996.

In 1997 the band released an extended version of Fragile. A compilation album, Fragmente, was released in 1998.

In 1999 the band released a studio album, The Point At Which It Falls Apart, achieving a breakthrough both artistically and in critical acclaim as well as commercially.

In 2000, they worked with the German dance producer Mark 'Oh, releasing the track "Waves", which reached position 83 in the German charts.

In 2002, Mesh were picked up by Sony Records, and released a new album Who Watches Over Me. The band grew in popularity in continental Europe, and most notably in Germany, where their singles and albums repeatedly attained chart positions.

In 2006 a new album, 'We Collide', was released, produced by former Depeche Mode producer, Gareth Jones.

On 13 September 2006, Taylor announced he was leaving the band after 15 years to pursue other interests. Hockings and Silverthorn decided to continue as a duo, using an augmented line-up for live shows. Initially, Geoff Pinckney replaced Taylor at live shows.

The new line-up signed to Dependent Records as their European record label. Metropolis Records represented them in the United States and South America.

A Perfect Solution was released in 2009. It was produced by the German dark electro producer Olaf Wollschläger. Silverthorn stated: "Olaf has a natural talent of tidying up our productions and spending a ridiculous amount of time perfecting them without changing the overall feel and mood". Olaf has continued to work with Mesh on subsequent releases.

In 2011, the band followed up A Perfect Solution with a remix of the album, entitled An Alternative Solution. In April 2011, the group toured the United States for the first time, playing on the "Legends of Synthpop" tour with Iris and De/Vision.

On 26 August 2011, the band announced via Twitter that Geoff Pinckney "will no longer be playing live with Mesh", as he wished to focus on his other musical project, Tenek. He was replaced by Richard Broadhead. Live drummer Sean Suleman also joined the line up around this time.

In 2013, the band released Automation Baby, which became the band's most successful album up to that point, entering the German charts at number 33, and topping the European Alternative Charts.

Following this success, the band felt under pressure to deliver with the followup album. When Looking Skyward was released in 2016, it achieved a number 12 position in the German charts, their highest to date.

In 2015, the band played with a classical orchestra at the 'Gothic meets Klassik' festival, hosted at the 'Gewandhaus zu Leipzig' in Leipzig. The show was recorded and initially scheduled for release in 2016. It was later decided to expand the live recording with some additional studio recorded tracks. These were recorded at Tonscheune Oleak, and the resulting album Live at Neues Gewandhaus Leipzig was released in November 2017.

In 2023, vocalist Mark Hockings released the debut album Watching Sleepers under the solo project Blackcarburning.

In April 2023, Vaughn George joined the live line-up on keyboards and backing vocals.

In January 2024, the band's official website published a blog post titled "What Happened to Mesh?", in which Dr. Carla Groom discussed the "very personal dynamics" behind the band's relative absence from the scene.

In November 2024, the band released a remastered 25th Anniversary Edition of their breakthrough sophomore album, The Point at Which It Falls Apart, making a long out-of-print classic available again.

In March 2026, Mesh released the highly anticipated The Truth Doesn't Matter, to widespread acclaim. The album reached number 15 in Germany, and number 23 in the UK Download Chart.

Mesh have developed a fan base in Germany and Scandinavia, where they have maintained a strong following, and have also gained notice in North and South American countries. However, success and recognition in their home country of the UK has historically been more limited. Richard Silverthorn discussed this in interviews in the 2010s, stating that while he would have welcomed greater recognition in the UK, the band had found a receptive audience elsewhere and that this had become their primary focus.

== Discography ==
=== Studio albums ===
- 1996: In This Place Forever
- 1999: The Point at Which It Falls Apart
- 2002: Who Watches over Me? Germany No. 63
- 2006: We Collide Germany No. 90
- 2009: A Perfect Solution Germany No. 89
- 2013: Automation Baby Germany No. 33
- 2016: Looking Skyward Germany No. 12
- 2026: The Truth Doesn't Matter Germany No. 15, UK Download Chart No. 23

=== Remastered Studio Albums ===
- 2024: The Point At Which It Falls Apart (25 Years Anniversary Edition)

=== Compilation and Live Albums ===
- 1998: Fragmente (compilation of various tracks with the single Trust You)
- 2000: On This Tour Forever (live album)
- 2002: Fragmente 2 (compilation)
- 2003: Original 91–93 (compilation)
- 2011: An Alternative Solution (remix album of A Perfect Solution)
- 2017: Live at Neues Gewandhaus Leipzig Germany No. 78

=== Singles and EPs ===
- 1994: Fragile (EP)
- 1997: "You Didn't Want Me"
- 1998: "Trust You"
- 1999: "People Like Me (With This Gun)"
- 1999: "It Scares Me"
- 1999: "Not Prepared"
- 2000: Live Singles (EP)
- 2000: "Waves" (feat. Mark 'Oh) Germany No. 83
- 2002: "Leave You Nothing"
- 2003: "Friends Like These" Germany No. 86
- 2006: "Crash" DE No. 88
- 2006: "My Hands Are Tied / Petrified" Germany No. 95
- 2009: "Only Better" Germany No. 84
- 2010: "How Long?"
- 2011: "From This Height" (EP)
- 2013: "Born to Lie"
- 2013: "Adjust Your Set"
- 2016: "Kill Your Darlings"
- 2017: "Runway" (EP)
- 2026: "Exile"
- 2026: "Hey Stranger" (EP)
- 2026: "This World" (EP)
- 2026: “Fallen Angel”

=== VHS/DVD ===
- 2000: On This Tour Forever
- 2006: The World's a Big Place
- 2017: Touring Skyward - A Tour Movie
