= Computerliebe (Die Module spielen verrückt) =

1984 song

Song by Paso Doble

from the album Fantasie
- Released: 1984
- Genre: Neue Deutsche Welle, Synthpop
- Length: 3:19
- Label: WEA
- Songwriters: Frank Hieber, Ulf Krüger
- Producers: Udo Arndt, Paso Doble

Computerliebe (Die Module spielen verrückt) is a song by the German band Paso Doble released in 1984, in the Neue Deutsche Welle genre. The music was composed by Frank Hieber; the text was written by Ulf Krüger. It was produced by Udo Arndt and Paso Doble. A cover version by the band Das Modul in 1995 also saw commercial success. The title translates as "Computer love (The modules are going crazy)" in English.

== Release and reception ==
The song was released as a single in 1984 by WEA, taken from Paso Doble's second album Fantasie. It reached 15th on the German single charts, where it spent 17 weeks, from 25 February through 17 June 1985.

Paso Doble performed the song several times on ZDF-Hitparade: after their first performance on 27 March 1985, they placed first in the audience vote (cast electronically through Tele-Dialog) which earned them a second appearance on 24 April 1985. They reprised their appearance on a 30 January 1986 special episode, Die Superhitparade – Hits des Jahres '85.

A remake of the song was issued in 2008 as "Computerliebe (Remake)" on the sampler Hautnah; five additional remixes were released in July 2017 on the album Computerliebe 2K17.

== Cover versions ==
The cover version by Das Modul, issued in 1995 by PolyGram, was more commercially successful than the original, charting third place in German, eighth in Austria, and eleventh in Switzerland. That year, Das Modul's single was certified gold. The song has been covered a number of times since, including:

- Blümchen (Computerliebe)
- Christian Petru (Computerliebe)
- Das Modul vs. E-Love (Computerliebe 7.1)
- Fraktus (Computerliebe)
- Lorenz Büffel feat. Sven Florijan (Computerliebe (in St. Pauli sind die Lichter rot bei Nacht))
- De Lancaster feat. Lea Marie Kaiser (Computerliebe)
- Starsplash (Computerliebe)
- Tag & Nacht (Computerliebe)
