= More Than Words: The Best of Kevin Kern =

Compilation album by Kevin Kern
- Released: 2002
- Recorded: 1996–2002
- Genre: New-age, instrumental
- Length: 64:02
- Label: Real Music
- Producer: Terence Yallop, Kevin Kern

Kevin Kern chronology
Embracing the Wind (2001)	More Than Words: The Best of Kevin Kern (2002)	The Winding Path (2003)

Professional ratings
Review scores
Source	Rating
Allmusic	3/5 stars

More Than Words: The Best of Kevin Kern, or simply More Than Words, is the first compilation album from American new-age pianist Kevin Kern. As with his preceding and succeeding albums, it is an album of instrumental songs. The compilation contains two new compositions, plus songs from all five of Kern's previous studio albums. It was released on September 3, 2002.

"Out of the Darkness into the Light" is not actually a new composition for the album per se; the liner notes indicate that it was composed for a Real Music compilation album called Freedom to Love, and that it was only re-arranged for More Than Words. "Children at Play", however, was specifically made for this album.

The track listing printed is incorrect; track 14 is actually "A Gentle Whisper", taken from the same album as "Blossom on the Wind" was from. However, Kevin Kern's official website still lists the song as "Blossom on the Wind" and plays a snippet of that song when selected; on the other hand, Allmusic correctly depicts the snippet and duration, but still incorrectly labels the song title. In addition to this, the liner notes incorrectly print the durations of "Out of the Darkness Into the Light" and "Children at Play".

== Track listing ==
No.	Title	Writer(s)	Originally from	Length
1.	"Above the Clouds"	Kevin Kern	Embracing the Wind	5:25
2.	"Sundial Dreams"	Kevin Kern	In the Enchanted Garden	4:47
3.	"Out of the Darkness Into the Light"	Kevin Kern	previously unreleased	4:16
4.	"In My Life"	John Lennon, Paul McCartney	In My Life	3:29
5.	"Through the Arbor"	Kevin Kern	In the Enchanted Garden	3:46
6.	"From This Day Forward"	Kevin Kern	Embracing the Wind	4:50
7.	"Threads of Light"	Kevin Kern	Beyond the Sundial	3:10
8.	"Pastel Reflections"	Kevin Kern	Summer Daydreams	4:32
9.	"We All Fall in Love Sometimes"	Elton John, Bernie Taupin	In My Life	4:24
10.	"Where Paths Meet"	Kevin Kern	Beyond the Sundial	5:15
11.	"After the Rain"	Kevin Kern	In the Enchanted Garden	4:06
12.	"Children at Play"	Kevin Kern	previously unreleased	5:07
13.	"Twilight's Embrace"	Kevin Kern	Summer Daydreams	7:00
14.	"A Gentle Whisper"	Kevin Kern	Embracing the Wind	4:00

== Personnel ==
- Kevin Kern - Piano, Keyboards, Producer
- Jeff Linsky - Guitar
- Terence Yallop - Executive Producer
