= Imagination's Light =

Studio album by Kevin Kern
- Released: July 19, 2005
- Recorded: February 28 – March 5, 2005
- Studio: Fantasy Studios, Berkeley, California
- Genre: New-age, instrumental
- Length: 43:35
- Label: Real Music
- Producer: Terence Yallop, Kevin Kern

Kevin Kern chronology
The Winding Path (2003)	Imagination's Light (2005)	Endless Blue Sky (2009)

Professional ratings
Review scores
Source	Rating
Allmusic	4.5/5 stars

Imagination's Light is the seventh studio album (ninth album overall) from American new-age pianist Kevin Kern. As with his preceding albums, it is an album of instrumental tunes, with the addition of a cover version of "Fields of Gold" by Sting. The album, a reminiscence of Kern's childhood playing piano in a darkened room lit by the fireplace, was released on July 19, 2005.

Before creating this album, Kern was invited to become a Steinway Artist, so for this album he played a Steinway concert grand piano made in Hamburg, Germany. An accompanying piano songbook was released in 2008 containing the ten compositions by Kern, written for the intermediate piano student.

== Dedication ==
In the accompanying booklet, Kevin Kern writes that "Keepers of the Flame" on an ancient Gregorian chant called "Pange Lingua". It is dedicated to Pope John Paul II.

== Track listing ==
All compositions by Kevin Kern except track 5, written by Sting.

1. "Remembering the Light" – 4:23
2. "Safe in Your Embrace" – 3:44
3. "Pearls of Joy" – 3:52
4. "Told to the Heart" – 4:14
5. "Fields of Gold" – 4:50
6. "Imagination's Key" – 4:11
7. "Keepers of the Flame" – 3:47
8. "Musings" – 3:41
9. "Sweet Dreams, Helena" – 3:48
10. "I Am Always Right Here" – 3:31
11. "And the Light is Forever" – 3:21

== Personnel ==
- Kevin Kern – Steinway piano, other keyboards, producer
- Terry Miller – acoustic and electric bass guitar
- Mike Miller – acoustic guitar
- Terence Yallop – executive producer
