= When a Child Is Born =

Christmas song

"When a Child Is Born" is a Christmas song, with a melody taken from "Soleado", a tune from 1974 by Ciro Dammicco (alias Zacar). The tune was based on Dammicco's earlier tune "Le rose blu" published in 1972. The English lyrics were written by Austrian composer Fred Jay as a Christmas song (although the song does not actually make any specific reference to Christmas). Versions of the song have been recorded by Michael Holm in 1974, Johnny Mathis, whose version was the 1976 Christmas number one in the UK, and Boney M, who included it on their hit 1981 Christmas Album.

== Johnny Mathis version ==
"When a Child Is Born"

Single by Johnny Mathis

from the album I Only Have Eyes for You
- A-side: "When a Child Is Born (Soleado)"
- B-side: "Every Time You Touch Me (I Get High)"
- Released: November 1976
- Recorded: 1976
- Genre: Easy listening, popular Christmas song
- Label: CBS
- Songwriters: Ciro Dammicco (music), Fred Jay (lyrics)
- Producer: Jack Gold

The most commercially successful version of the song is the 1976 recording by American singer Johnny Mathis, titled "When a Child Is Born (Soleado)". Released in November 1976, the single featured a cover of Charlie Rich's "Every Time You Touch Me (I Get High)" as its B-side.

Mathis' rendition became a major hit in the United Kingdom, where it topped the UK Singles Chart for three consecutive weeks in December 1976. This included the coveted Christmas number one position. It remains Johnny Mathis' only chart-topping single in the UK and sold approximately 885,000 copies.

In the United States, the song appeared in the Record World chart during the 1976 and 1977 Christmas seasons, peaking at No. 123 and spending a total of ten weeks on the survey. Mathis later re-recorded the song as a duet with Gladys Knight & the Pips; this version reached No. 137 on the Record World chart during the 1980 Christmas season and entered the UK Singles Chart at No. 79.

=== Certifications ===
Region	Certification	Certified units/sales
United Kingdom (BPI)	Gold	400,000^{‡}
^{‡} Sales+streaming figures based on certification alone.

== History ==
The melody was used with German lyrics by Michael Holm in "Tränen lügen nicht" (translation: Tears Don't Lie) in 1974. In German, the song is unrelated to Christmas. The singer asks a guy to reconsider breaking up with his girl because her tears don't lie. Holm recorded a new version of "Tränen lügen nicht" for the international market, with new lyrics in English by Fred Jay, and this was the first version of the English-language "When a Child Is Born". It was a minor hit in the US and Canada, reaching #53 on Billboard's Hot 100, #7 on Billboard's Easy Listening Top 50,and #25 on Canadian RPM Top Singles chart. The tune was also used for Mark 'Oh's 1995 dance hit, "Tears Don't Lie".
