= Manolo Otero =

Spanish actor (1942-2011)

Manuel Otero Aparicio (25 June 1942 in Madrid – 1 June 2011 in São Paulo, Brazil), known as Manolo Otero, was a Spanish singer, actor and director.

== Musical career ==
Otero recorded a Spanish language version of When a Child is Born in 1973, with the Spanish title Todo el Tiempo del Mundo (All the Time in the World), which became a number one hit for 18 weeks from December 1974 to April 1975.

== Film career ==
In 1967, Otero won the Grand Prix at the Annecy International Animation Film Festival for directing Arès contre Atlas. He co-directed other short films, including Patchwork and Rails.

== Personal life ==
In 1973, Otero married actress María José Cantudo. They had one son, Manuel, and separated in 1978. Following a relationship with Argentine model and Miss Universe Silvana Suárez he married Colombian model Eddy Cano in 1986.
