= Die Versuchung =

Studio album by Jasmin Wagner
- Released: 15 April 2006
- Genre: Pop; easy listening; sunshine pop

Die Versuchung ("The Temptation") is an album by German singer Jasmin Wagner, released on 15 April 2006.

== Track listing ==
- "Männer brauchen Liebe" (Men Need Love)
- "Ein zerbrechlicher Moment" (A Fragile Moment)
- "Ein schlechtes Gewissen" (A Bad Conscience)
- "Wahrscheinlich Hallo" (Probably Hello)
- "Komm schon werd' wütend" (Come On, Get Furious)
- "Versuchung" (Temptation)
- "Ich bereue dich so gerne" (I Regret You So Happily)
- "Ein neues Gefühl" (A New Feeling)
- "Morgen, wenn ich weg bin" (Tomorrow, When I'm Gone)
- "Entschuldigen Sie" (Pardon Me)
- "Alles, was du willst" (Everything You Want)
