= Marko Albrecht =

German disc jockey and electronic music producer

Mark 'Oh
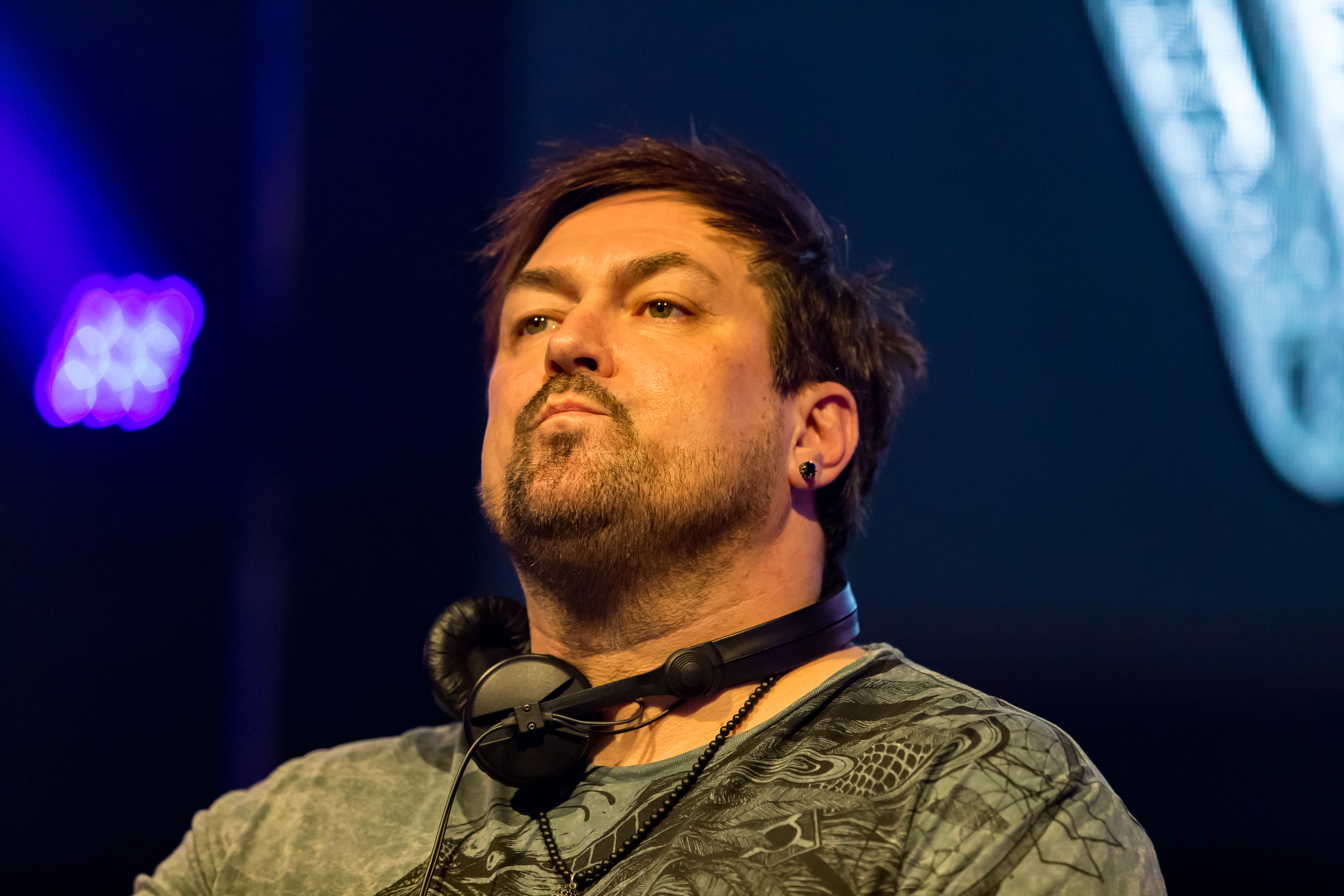
- Mark 'Oh @ Sunshine Live Retroactive 2017 in Mannheim

Background information
- Born: Marko Albrecht; 23 June 1970 (age 56); Dorsten, Germany
- Genres: Hard trance; Eurodance; house; happy hardcore
- Occupations: Electronic musician; DJ; record producer
- Instruments: Turntables; personal computer; keyboards
- Years active: 1993–present

Marko Albrecht (born 23 June 1970), known by his stage name Mark 'Oh, is a German disc jockey and electronic music producer.

== Biography ==
Starting out with a rock band titled "Line Up", Albrecht decided to turn to the ever-growing rave scene under the name "Mark'Oh".

Entering the scene as a DJ initially, Albrecht moved on to producing music - scoring chart success across Europe in 1993 with "Randy (Never Stop That Feeling)". The following year, hit single "Love Song" was to follow before scoring his first number one single in his native Germany and in Sweden with "Tears Don't Lie" (which samples the 1974 German hit "Tränen lügen nicht" by Michael Holm, which itself is a cover of the Italian hit "Soleado", released the same year).

Though this was his sole number one hit in Europe, nearly two decades on, Albrecht is still releasing singles and producing albums. He still achieves some level of success in his native country of Germany.

== Discography ==
=== Albums ===
Title	Album details	Peak chart positions				
Title	Album details	GER	AUT	NDL	SWE	SWI
Never Stop That Feeling	Released: 1995; Label: Peace Records	2	6	6	23	4
Magic Power	Released: 1996; Label: Peace Records	45	—	95	—	—
Rebirth	Released: 1999; Label: Orbit Records	33	—	—	—	—
The Best of Mark'Oh: Never Stopped Livin' That Feeling	Released: 2001; Label: Orbit Records	49	—	—	—	—
Mark'Oh	Released: 2003; Label: Orbit Records	10	25	—	—	—
More Than Words	Released: 2004; Label: Orbit Records	44	—	—	—	—
The Past, the Present, the Future	Released: 2009; Label: ZYX Music	—	—	—	—	—
United – the Essential Mark 'Oh	Released: 2009; Label: ZYX Music	—	—	—	—	—

=== Singles ===
Year	Title	Peak chart positions									Album
Year	Title	GER	AUT	BEL	IRE	NED	NOR	SWE	SWI	UK	Album
1993	"Randy (Never Stop That Feeling)"	25	—	—	—	30	—	—	—	—	Never Stop That Feeling
1994	"Love Song"	5	—	—	—	13	—	—	8	—	Never Stop That Feeling
1994	"Tears Don't Lie"	1	3	2	9	2	8	1	3	24	Never Stop That Feeling
1994	"Tears Don't Lie (Remixes)	—	—	—	—	—	—	18	—	—	Never Stop That Feeling
1995	"Droste, Hörst Du Mich?"	2	14	—	—	—	—	—	8	—	***
1995	"I Can't Get No (Wahaha)"	18	—	—	—	—	—	—	43	—	Magic Power
1996	"Tell Me"	28	—	—	—	—	—	—	41	—	***
1996	"Fade to Grey"	11	24	—	—	24	—	45	15	—	Magic Power
1996	"The Right Way"	34	—	—	—	—	—	—	—	—	Magic Power
1998	"The Team on Tour" (featuring Cécile)	54	—	—	—	—	—	—	—	—	***
1999	"The Sparrows and the Nightingales"	14	—	—	—	—	—	—	—	—	Rebirth
1999	"Your Love"	25	—	—	—	—	—	—	—	—	Rebirth
1999	"Rebirth"	86	—	—	—	—	—	—	—	—	Rebirth
2000	"Waves" (featuring Mesh)	83	—	—	—	—	—	—	—	—	***
2001	"Never Stop That Feeling 2001"	11	20	—	—	—	—	—	97	—	***
2002	"Tears Don't Lie 2002"	35	36	—	—	—	—	—	—	—	***
2002	"Let This Party Never End"	6	9	—	—	—	—	—	94	—	Mark'Oh
2002	"Because I Love You" (meets Digital Rockers)	7	9	—	—	37	—	—	97	—	***
2002	"When The Children Cry"	17	26	—	—	—	—	—	—	—	Mark'Oh
2003	"Stuck on You"	10	12	—	—	—	—	—	—	—	More Than Words
2004	"Words" featuring Tjerk	14	17	—	—	—	—	—	—	—	More Than Words
2006	"Let It Out (Shout Shout Shout)"	63	—	—	—	—	—	—	—	—	***
2008	"I Don't Like Mondays"	—	—	—	—	—	—	—	—	—	***
2009	"United"	48	32	—	—	—	—	—	—	—	The Past, the Present, the Future
2009	"Scatman"	88	53	—	—	—	—	—	—	—	The Past, the Present, the Future
2011	"Party to the Rooftop"	—	—	—	—	—	—	—	—	—	***
2012	"DJ Waiting For"	—	—	—	—	—	—	—	—	—	***
2018	"Someone to Love"	—	—	—	—	—	—	—	—	—	***
2018	"That Feeling" (featuring Corinna Jane)	—	—	—	—	—	—	—	—	—	***
2020	"Jean-Claude Van Damme"	—	—	—	—	—	—	—	—	—	***
2023	"Don't Put the Blame on Me"	—	—	—	—	—	—	—	—	—	***
2023	"You (Are a Monster)"	—	—	—	—	—	—	—	—	—	***

- *** Denotes released as single only
