= Paso Doble (band) =

German band

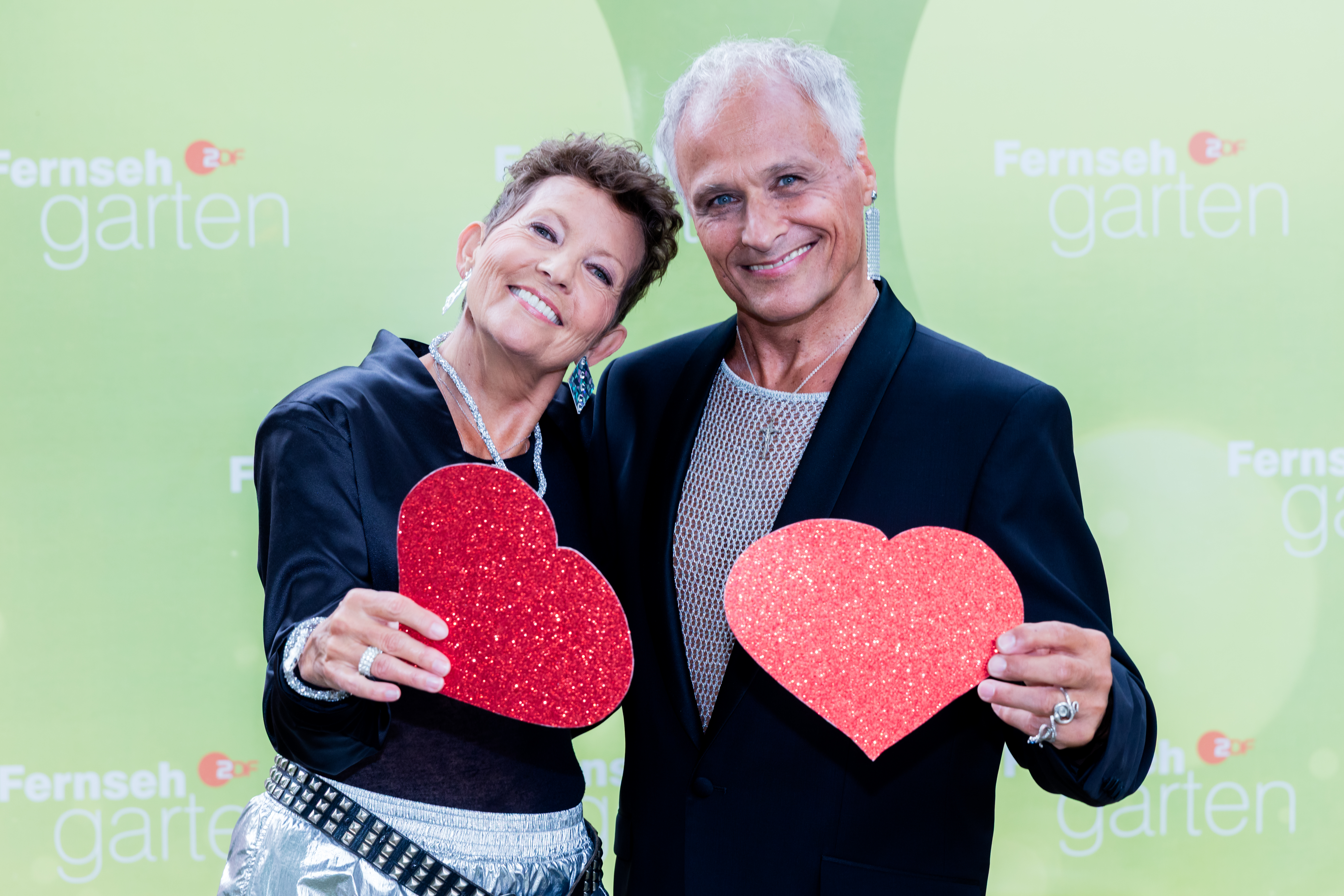
- Frank & Rale Oberpichler, 2025

Background information
- Origin: Germany
- Genres: Neue Deutsche Welle, new wave, techno (later)
- Labels: WEA; Intercord; Kiosk; High-Head
- Members: Rale and Frank Oberpichler

Paso Doble is a German Neue Deutsche Welle (new German wave) band that formed in 1983. Their songs "Computerliebe", "Herz an Herz" and "Fantasie" have appeared on several Best of NDW/new wave compilations. They are well known for their unique sound as well as their unusual style and choreography, which have a Spanish style to go with the band's name, Paso Doble.

== Career ==
In 1979, Rale Oberpichler, a young singer who worked mainly as a background vocalist, wanted to go solo and was looking for a songwriter. She met Frank Hieber, a pianist, keyboarder and composer who had worked with various groups and singers including Rio Reiser, Nena and Peter Schilling on his international hit "Major Tom (Coming Home)". Together, they formed Paso Doble.

In 1985, they released their first single "Computerliebe" ("computer love", not to be confused with the Kraftwerk song of the same name), which debuted on the TV show Extratour and hit number 1 on the charts for several weeks. They also had a very well received appearance in the Hitparade in March 1985. The first album they released was Fantasie and the title track also spent several weeks at number 1.

What would have been their second album, Versunkener Schatz, which they produced in 1986, was never released. Two of the songs were published as singles: "Herz an Herz" and "Magische Nacht". The album was eventually made available to the public via downloads on AOL, iTunes and MusicLoad.

The band decided to shift their work to a production and publishing side, while still releasing the occasional single and remixes. In 1992, they founded the Paso Doble Music Publishing House.

They returned to the stage after having some hiatus. A new 12" single, "Message angekommen", was released in 2005. Their two most famous songs, "Computerliebe" and "Herz an Herz", have been covered by Das Modul and Blümchen, respectively. 2020 marked a comeback, and a new album was released.

== Releases ==
=== Albums ===
- Fantasie (LP Album)
- Computerliebe (CD "Best of" Album)
- Magische Nacht (Download only Album)
- Urknall (LP)

=== Singles ===
- "Computerliebe (Die Module spielen verrückt)" (7″)
- "Computerliebe (Special Disco Version)" (12″)
- "Fantasie" (7″)
- "Fantasie" (12″ Maxi)
- "Herz an Herz" (12″)
- "Herz an Herz" (7″)
- "Magische Nacht" (12" Promo)
- "Allein im All" (CD Maxi)
- "Message angekommen" (12″)
- "Kleine Killer"
