= Boomerang (Blümchen song) =

Single by Blümchen

from the album Herzfrequenz/Heartbeat
- B-side: "Remix"
- Released: 12 June 1996
- Genre: Eurodance; Happy Hardcore; Hard trance
- Length: 3:51
- Label: Control
- Songwriters: Alfred von Meysenbug; Lukas Hilbert; Arn Schlürmann
- Producers: Arn Schlürmann; Stani Djukanovic

Blümchen singles chronology
"Kleiner Satellit (Piep, Piep)" (1996)	"Boomerang" (1996)	"Du und Ich" (1996)

Music video
- "Boomerang" on YouTube

"Boomerang" is a song recorded by German recording artist Blümchen (a.k.a. Jasmin Wagner). It is one of her most well-known songs and was released in June 1996 by Control label as the third single from her debut album, Herzfrequenz/Heartbeat (1996). Produced by producers/songwriters Arn Schlürmann and Stani Djukanovic, the song was also co-written by Schlürmann with Alfred von Meysenbug and Lukas Hilbert. During its first chart run, it peaked at number eleven in Germany, number nine in Switzerland, number ten in Austria and number sixteen in Norway (April 1997). On the Eurochart Hot 100, the single reached number 33 in August 1996. It is sung in German, and its accompanying music video, directed by Oliver Sommer, features Blümchen performing while she rolls around on roller skates in Miami Beach.

In 2010, "Boomerang" returned to the German charts for three weeks, peaking at number two on the download chart, and number seven on the single chart. On the Europe Top 200 chart, it reached number 89.

== Track listing ==
- 12" single, Germany (1996)
1. "Boomerang" (Langer Boooomerang Mix) — 5:25
2. "Boomerang" (Album Mix) — 5:06
3. "Boomerang" (In Der Luft Mix) — 3:51
- CD single, Germany (2010)
1. "Boomerang" — 3:51
2. "Herz An Herz" — 3:46
- CD maxi, Germany, Austria & Switzerland (1996)
1. "Boomerang" (Boomerang In Der Luft Mix) — 3:51
2. "Boomerang" (Langer Boooomerang Mix) — 5:25
3. "Boomerang" (Boomerang Album Mix) — 5:06

== Charts ==
=== Weekly charts ===
Chart (1996)	Peak position
Austria (Ö3 Austria Top 40)	10
Europe (Eurochart Hot 100)	33
Germany (GfK)	11
Norway (VG-lista)	16
Switzerland (Schweizer Hitparade)	9

Chart (2010)	Peak position
Europe (Europe Top 200)	89
Germany (Download Chart)	2
Germany (Official German Charts)	7

=== Year-end charts ===
Chart (1996)	Position
Germany (Official German Charts)	87
