= Dancing Dots =

Music technology service for the blind

Dancing Dots Braille Music Technology is an American company based in Philadelphia founded in 1992 to develop and adapt music technology for the blind. Its founder, Bill McCann, is a blind musician. Among the products it offers are several programs that produce a musical version of Braille by converting print musical notation, allowing blind musicians access to the scores used by their sighted counterparts. The company also offers programs that aid blind musicians in transcribing their compositions to Braille. Dancing Dots created the latter products to help speed the process of Braille transcription for blind composers, who might otherwise have to wait between two weeks and six months to have their compositions transcribed by one of the less than one hundred certified Braille music transcribers in the United States.

== History ==
The company was founded in 1992 by Bill McCann, a blind trumpeter. It struggled financially in its early years in the long lead between developing technology and releasing its first product in 1997, a difficult period assisted by federal contracts beginning in 1994. In 1997, the company released its GOODFEEL Braille Music Translator to positive reviews. The product was well received, and its company was a success. In 1999, the company, which was a recipient of a Small Business Innovation Research Grant, was part of a display of assistive technology at the White House. In 2000, Dancing Dots released CakeTalking for SONAR, JAWS scripts and tutorials that provide access to Cakewalk Sonar, a digital audio workstation, for blind or visually impaired users.

== Products and services ==
Dancing Dots maintains a website at which it markets its products, as well as related and complementary products by other companies.

With GOODFEEL combined with a few mainstream products, sighted musicians can prepare a Braille score with no knowledge of braille. Music scanning software can be used to speed up data entry. Blind users can make sound recordings and print and Braille editions of their compositions.

Dancing Dots is also the publisher of several courses to assist blind musicians, including An Introduction to Music for the Blind Student: A Course in Braille Music Reading and An Introduction to the Piano for the Blind Student.
