= More Than Words (Mark 'Oh album) =

More than Words

Studio album by Mark 'Oh
- Released: 16 February 2004
- Recorded: 2004
- Length: CD 1: 48:11; CD 2: 61:36
- Label: Home Records GmbH
- Producer: Mark 'Oh; André Schöttler

Mark 'Oh chronology
Mark 'Oh (2003)	More than Words (2004)	The Past, The Present, The Future (2009)

Singles from More than Words
- 1. "Stuck on You" Released: July 14, 2003; 2. "Words" Released: 2003

More than Words is the fifth album released by German DJ and electronic music producer Mark 'Oh, released on February 16, 2004, by Home Records GmbH.

The album contains two cover songs, a cover of the song "Stuck on You", released by Lionel Richie in 1984, and a cover of "Get Here", released by Brenda Russell in 1988.

== Track listing ==
CD 1
No.	Title	Length
1.	"Words"	3:40
2.	"You"	5:49
3.	"Stuck On You"	3:59
4.	"Get Here"	5:40
5.	"Fly Away"	4:56
6.	"Partytime On Planet Earth"	7:39
7.	"I Promise My Love To You"	3:45
8.	"Magic Symphony"	4:14
9.	"Party Train"	4:04
10.	"Around The World"	4:19

CD Extra Part
No.	Title	Length
11.	"Words" (Music Video)	3:43

CD 2(DJ-Set / Limited Fan-Edition)
No.	Title	Length
1.	"Party Train"	3:22
2.	"I Promise My Love"	7:03
3.	"Get Here"	7:05
4.	"Partytime On Planet Earth"	8:05
5.	"Words"	7:17
6.	"Mystic Symphony"	5:01
7.	"You"	7:06
8.	"Fly Away"	5:41
9.	"Stuck on You"	6:44
10.	"Around The World"	4:13

== Album credits ==
All songs on More than Words are produced by Mark 'Oh & André Schöttler

- Words
  - Vocals By: Tjerk Schoonheim
  - Music and Words By: Mark 'Oh & André Schöttler
- You
  - Vocals By: Diana Schneider
  - Music & Words By: Mark 'Oh & André Schöttler
- Stuck on You
  - Vocals By: Martha Zaremba
  - Music & Words By: Lionel Richie
- Get Here
  - Vocals By: Diana Schneider
  - Music & Words By: Brenda Russell
- Fly Away
  - Vocals By: Cinzia Sollai
  - Music & Words By: Mark 'Oh & André Schöttler
- Partytime On Planet Earth
  - Vocals By: Tjerk Schoonheim
  - Music & Words By: Mark 'Oh & André Schöttler
- I Promise My Love
  - Vocals By: Diana Sorbello
  - Music & Words By: Mark 'Oh & André Schöttler
- Mystic Symphony
  - Vocals By: Diana Sorbello
  - Music & Words By: Mark 'Oh & André Schöttler
- Party Train
  - Vocals By: Diana Schneider
  - Music & Words By: Mark 'Oh & André Schöttler
- Around The World
  - Vocals By: Monique Loswijk
  - Rap By: Rene Phillips
  - Music & Words By: Mark 'Oh & André Schöttler
