= In the Enchanted Garden =

Studio album by Kevin Kern
- Released: February 27, 1996
- Recorded: 1996
- Genre: New-age, instrumental
- Length: 43:37
- Label: Real Music
- Producer: Terence Yallop, Kevin Kern

Kevin Kern chronology
In the Enchanted Garden (1996)	Beyond the Sundial (1997)

Professional ratings
Review scores
Source	Rating
Allmusic	3/5 stars

In the Enchanted Garden is the debut album from American new-age pianist Kevin Kern. As with his succeeding albums, it is an album of instrumental songs. It was released on February 27, 1996.

== Track listing ==
All compositions by Kevin Kern.

1. "Through the Arbor" – 3:45
2. "Sundial Dreams" – 4:46
3. "The Enchanted Garden" – 6:54
4. "Butterfly" – 2:52
5. "Straw Hats" – 4:14
6. "Another Realm" – 5:02
7. "Water Lilies" – 4:17
8. "Fairy Wings" – 4:30
9. "Paper Clouds" – 3:07
10. "After the Rain" – 4:10

== Personnel ==
- Kevin Kern – piano, keyboards, Producer
- Jeff Linsky – guitar
- Terence Yallop – Executive Producer
