= Kevin Kern (musician) =

American musician (born 1958)

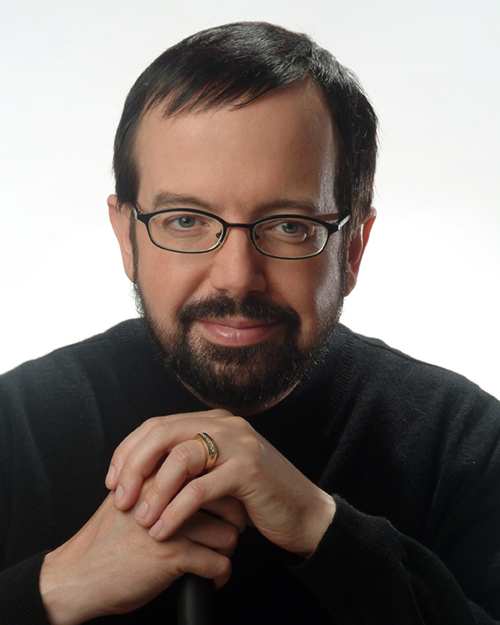

Background information
- Born: Kevin Lark Gibbs; December 22, 1958 (age 67)
- Origin: Detroit, Michigan US
- Genre: New-age
- Occupations: Pianist; composer
- Instrument: Piano
- Years active: 1996–present
- Labels: Real Music, Kevin Kern Music
- Website: www.kevinkern.com

Kevin Kern (born Kevin Lark Gibbs on December 22, 1958) is an American pianist, composer and recording artist known for his new-age compositions. Born legally blind, Kern is aided in studio by SONAR's accessibility and Dancing Dots's assistive music technologies for the vision impaired.

== Biography ==
Kern was born in Detroit, Michigan. He was found playing "Silent Night" on the piano at 18 months of age. He started learning the piano regularly at four years and began writing music at eight. At 14, he put on performances with the music group he founded called "The Well-Tempered Clavichord". He studied with Russian-Ukrainian pianist Mischa Kottler, and was inspired by blind pianist George Shearing, who stayed with Kern's family when performing nearby.

== Personal life ==
Kevin Kern is married to Pamela Gibbs, a former cardiac transplant nurse and product manager for several medical device companies. According to the liner notes of his album, Embracing the Wind, the couple were married in June 2001 on the island of Maui, Hawaii, in a private ceremony with friends and family present. The song "From This Day Forward" was written for her. She has been mentioned in his album credits several times, including playing the rainstick on "Through the Veil" on The Winding Path, and for catering several recording sessions. After living for several years in San Francisco, they moved to Minneapolis in 2007.

== Discography ==
Kevin Kern discography
- Studio albums: 10
- Compilation albums: 2

=== Studio albums ===
- 1996 – In the Enchanted Garden
- 1997 – Beyond the Sundial
- 1998 – Summer Daydreams
- 1999 – In My Life
- 2001 – Embracing the Wind
- 2003 – The Winding Path
- 2005 – Imagination's Light
- 2009 – Endless Blue Sky
- 2012 – Enchanted Piano
- 2012 – Christmas
- 2016 – When I Remember
- 2024 – Winter's Lullaby

=== Compilation albums ===
- 2002 – More Than Words: The Best of Kevin Kern
- 2014 – Always Near - A Romantic Collection

=== Other album appearances ===
- 1997 – Eternity: A Romantic Collection
- 1997 – Tranquility
- 1997 – Piano Dreamers
- 2002 – Sacred Spa Music Series
- 2005 – Real Piano
- 2006 – InSparation
- 2009 – Sacred Spa Music Series 2

== Songbooks ==
- 2001 – Kevin Kern Piano Album Songbook
- 2002 – Through Your Eyes: Kevin Kern Collection Songbook (Japan only)
- 2006 – In the Enchanted Garden Songbook
- 2008 – Imagination's Light Songbook

== See also ==
- List of ambient music artists
