= Soleado =

Wordless song composed by Ciro Dammicco

Single by Daniel Sentacruz Ensemble

from the album Soleado
- B-side: "Per Elisa"
- Released: 1974
- Genre: Pop
- Length: 4:12
- Label: La voce del padrone
- Songwriter(s): Zacar

Daniel Sentacruz Ensemble singles chronology
"Soleado" (1974)	"Para bailar, para cantar" (1975)

"Soleado" (Spanish: "Sunny") is a mainly instrumental piece of music composed by Ciro Dammicco under the alias "Zacar", based on his earlier composition "Le rose blu" (1972). The song was recorded in 1974 by Dammico's band, the Daniel Sentacruz Ensemble, and presented at that year's edition of Festivalbar. It became an instant hit, selling over five million copies in Europe.

== Cover versions ==
Following the success of Soleado, many artists went on to cover the song adding lyrics.

In 1974 Spanish actor and singer Manolo Otero recited a poem, Todo el tiempo del mundo (All the Time in the World), with the tune in the background.

The first version with proper lyrics was Tränen lügen nicht (Tears don't lie) by Michael Holm in 1974, which topped the charts in Germany and became a Top 10 hit in Austria and Switzerland. Holm also recorded an English version of the song, When a child is born, which was number 53 on the Billboard chart.

In 1975, Neşe Karaböcek included a cover in Turkish named Gözyaşları Yalan Söylemez (Tears Don't Lie) on her album Deli Gibi Sevdim. Mireille Mathieu recorded a version in French, On ne vit pas sans se dire adieu (We do not live without saying goodbye). The second English lyric version There comes the day was recorded and released on single by Vera Lynn. The Czech singer Karel Gott released a version called Měl jsem rád a mám (I loved and I still do).

Michael Holm's version with English lyrics, When a Child Is Born, was also recorded by Johnny Mathis, and was the Christmas number one hit in the UK in 1976. Also in Britain that same year St Andrew's Chorale released a non-lyriced version under the title Cloud 99 on Decca Records, which reached number 31 in the UK charts. In addition that year, the Slovak singer Karol Konárik recorded a version called Rozchod (Farewell) with lyrics by Ľuboš Zeman. In Hungary Cserháti Zsuzsa did a cover of the song in 1978 entitled "Édes kisfiam" (My sweet little son).

Mari Trini recorded a Spanish version, Te amaré, te amo y te querré (I will love you, I love you and I will) in 1981.

The Polish pop band Bayer Full recorded the song as Blondyneczka (Little Blonde One) in 1992. In 2008 the Italian band Elio e le Storie Tese performed a version of the song with the lyrics "Buon anno nuovo" (Happy New Year) during a New Year's Eve concert.

In 1994, German disc jockey Mark 'Oh scored a hit in the German charts with a dance rendition of Holm's version. Percy Faith, Santo & Johnny, Paul Mauriat and other artists recorded instrumental versions.
