= Daniel Sentacruz Ensemble =

Italian band

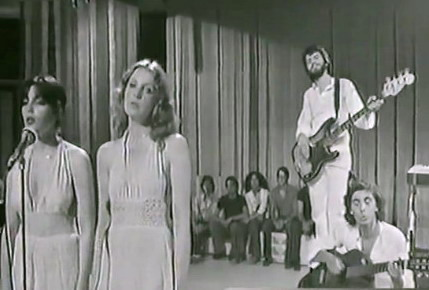
- Daniel Sentacruz Ensemble in 1975

Background information
- Origin: Italy
- Genres: Dance-pop, easy listening
- Years active: 1974–1980
- Label: EMI

Daniel Sentacruz Ensemble was an Italian pop group formed in 1974. Their first single "Soleado", a semi-instrumental track written by lead singer Ciro Dammicco and Dario Baldan Bembo, sold over five million copies in Europe, giving the band international popularity. In 1976 and in 1978 Daniel Sentacruz Ensemble entered the Sanremo Music Festival with the songs "Linda Bella Linda" (peaking number three on the Italian chart) and "1/2 notte". Unable to replicate their initial success, the group eventually disbanded in 1980.

== Band members ==
- Ciro Dammicco – vocals (1974–1979)
- Mara Cubeddu – vocals (1974–1979)
- Linda Lee – vocals (1974–1979)
- Gianni Minuti Muffolini – vocals, guitar (1974–1979)
- Angelo Santori – keyboard (1974–1975)
- Stefano Dammicco – keyboard (1977–1979)
- Bruno Santori – keyboard (1974–1976)
- Gianni Calabria – drums (1974–1979)
- Savino Grieco – bass guitar, vocals (1974–1979)

== Discography ==
Albums

- 1974 – Soleado (EMI Italiana 3C 064-18037)
- 1975 – Dos (EMI Italiana 3C 064-18102)
- 1977 – Daniel Sentacruz Ensemble (EMI Italiana 3C 064-18249)
- 1979 – Diventiamo più amici (EMI Italiana 3C 064-18399)
