= Hold Me =

Hold Me may refer to:

== Music ==
=== Albums ===
- Hold Me (Laura Branigan album) or the title song (see below), 1985
- Hold Me (Zard album), 1992
- Hold Me (EP), by Jamie Grace, or the title song, 2011

=== Songs ===
- "Hold Me" (1933 song), written by Jack Little, David Oppenheim, and Ira Schuster
- "Hold Me" (Anouk & Douwe Bob song), 2015
- "Hold Me" (Barbara Mandrell song), 1977
- "Hold Me" (Earth, Wind & Fire song), 2003
- "Hold Me" (Fleetwood Mac song), 1982
- "Hold Me" (K. T. Oslin song), 1988
- "Hold Me" (Laura Branigan song), 1985
- "Hold Me" (Menudo song), 1985
- "Hold Me" (Sandhja song), 2013
- "Hold Me" (Savage Garden song), 1999
- "Hold Me" (Sheila E. song), 1987
- "Hold Me" (Teddy Pendergrass and Whitney Houston song), 1984
- "Hold Me" (Tom Odell song), 2013
- "Hold Me" (Yoko Ono song), 2013
- "Hold Me", by Brian McKnight from Anytime, 1997
- "Hold Me", by Carl Wilson from Carl Wilson, 1981
- "Hold Me", by Duran Duran from Notorious, 1986
- "Hold Me", by England Dan & John Ford Coley from Some Things Don't Come Easy, 1978
- "Hold Me", by Farid Mammadov, representing Azerbaijan in the Eurovision Song Contest 2013
- "Hold Me", by For Real from Free, 1996
- "Hold Me", by Kenny Rogers from Eyes That See in the Dark, 1983
- "Hold Me", by Rebecca Ferguson from Superwoman, 2016
- "Hold Me", by R3hab, 2017
- "Hold Me", by Status Quo from In Search of the Fourth Chord, 2007
- "Hold Me", by Weezer from Make Believe, 2005
