= Looking for Freedom =

Looking for Freedom may refer to:

- Looking for Freedom (song), a song by Marc Seaberg, covered by Tony Marshall and by David Hasselhoff
- Looking for Freedom (album), a 1989 album by David Hasselhoff
