= Flying on the Wings of Tenderness =

1989 David Hasselhoff song

Single by David Hasselhoff

from the album Looking for Freedom
- B-side: "Yesterday's Love"
- Released: September 1989
- Length: 3:50
- Label: White
- Songwriter(s): Jack White; Jerry Rix
- Producer(s): Jack White

David Hasselhoff singles chronology
"Song of the Night" (1989)	"Flying on the Wings of Tenderness" (1989)	"Torero – Te Quiero" (1989)

"Flying on the Wings of Tenderness" is a song by American actor and singer David Hasselhoff. It was produced by Jack White, and written by him and Jerry Rix. The song was released in September 1989 as the fourth single from Hasselhoff's third studio album Looking for Freedom (1989).

== Chart performance ==
"Flying on the Wings of Tenderness" reached a peak position of number 22 in Germany, where it spent a total of 17 weeks on the chart. It also reached number 91 on the European Hot 100 Singles.

== Track listing ==
1. "Flying on the Wings of Tenderness" — 3:50
2. "Yesterday's Love" — 4:17

== Charts ==
Chart (1989–1990)	Peak position
Europe (European Hot 100 Singles)	91
Germany (GfK)	22
