= Is Everybody Happy (song) =

1989 David Hasselhoff song

Single by David Hasselhoff

from the album Looking for Freedom
- Released: June 1989
- Length: 4:28
- Label: White
- Songwriter(s): Jack White; Charles Blackwell
- Producer(s): Jack White

David Hasselhoff singles chronology
"Looking for Freedom" (1989)	"Is Everybody Happy" (1989)	"Our First Night Together" (1989)

"Is Everybody Happy" is a song by American actor and singer David Hasselhoff. Produced by Jack White, and written by he and Charles Blackwell, the song was released in June 1989 as the second single from Hasselhoff's third studio album Looking for Freedom (1989). It also served as the follow-up single from the album's title track, which was a number-one hit in Germany for eight weeks. The song did well commercially, reaching the top-ten in Germany and Switzerland.

== Live performances ==
Hasselhoff first performed the song live in 1989 on the German TV shows Peters Popshow and Na Siehste!. The song went on to became part of the set-list of Hasselhoff's concert tours, starting with the Freedom Tour in 1990.

== Chart performance ==
"Is Everybody Happy" became the second-most successful song from Looking for Freedom. It became Hasselhoff's second top-ten hit in Germany and Switzerland, peaking at number eight in both countries. It also reached number 42 in Belgium, and number 35 on the European Hot 100 Singles.

== Track listings ==
7" single

1. "Is Everybody Happy" (Euro Mix) — 3:57
2. "Is Everybody Happy" (US-Mix) — 3:43

CD and 12" single

1. "Is Everybody Happy" (Euro-Mix Extended Version) — 5:31
2. "Is Everybody Happy" (Euro-Mix Radio Version) — 3:57
3. "Is Everybody Happy" (US-Mix Extended Version) — 5:53
4. "Is Everybody Happy" (US-Mix Radio Version) — 3:43
5. "Is Everybody Happy" (Instrumental) — 3:44

== Charts ==
=== Weekly charts ===
Chart (1989)	Peak position
Belgium (Ultratop 50 Flanders)	42
Europe (European Hot 100 Singles)	35
Switzerland (Schweizer Hitparade)	8
West Germany (GfK)	8

=== Year-end charts ===
Chart (1989)	Position
West Germany (Media Control)	84
