= David Hasselhoff Museum =

Museum about David Hasselhoff in Berlin, Germany

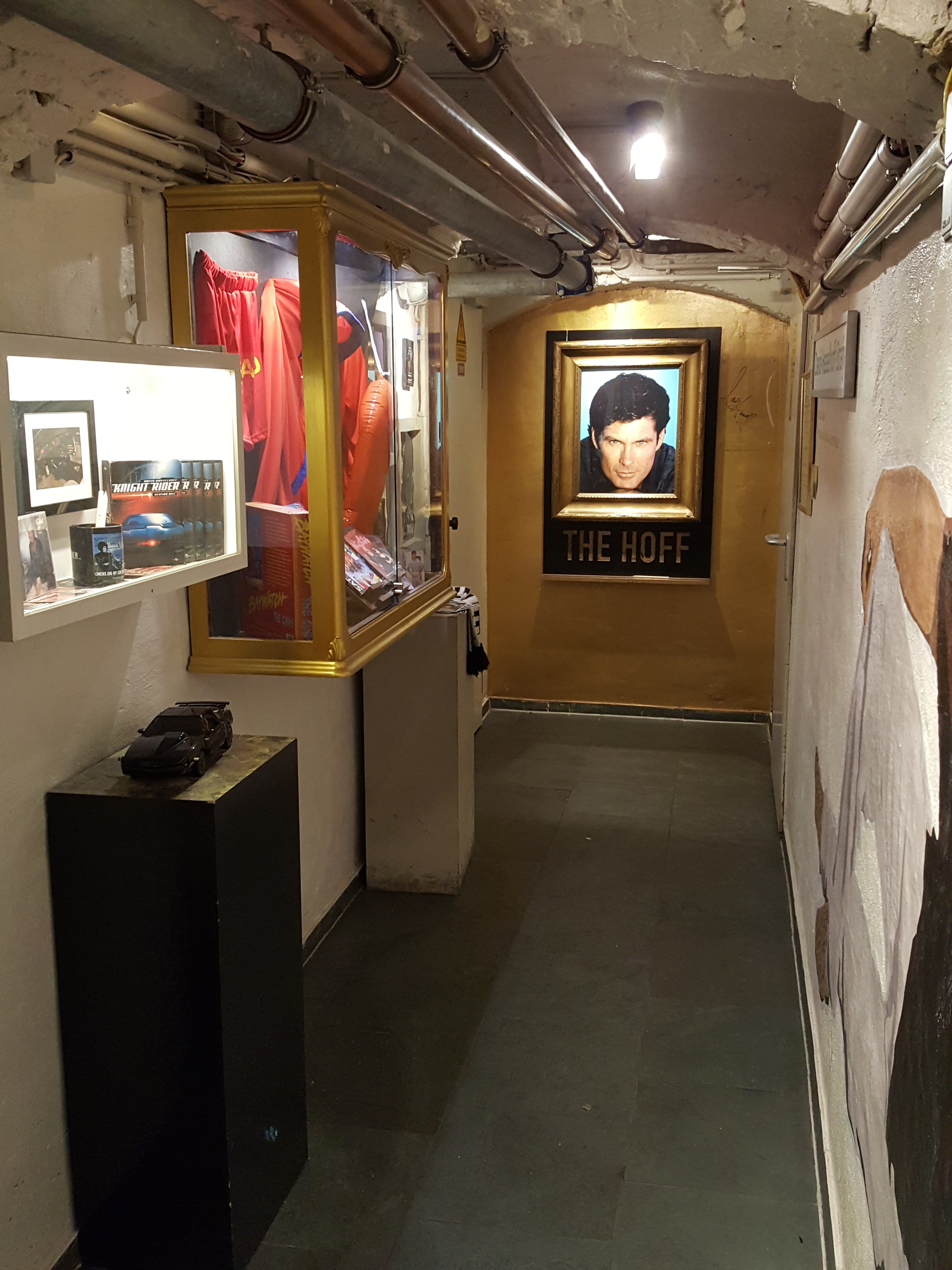
- Location: Germany
- Coordinates: 52°31′48″N 13°24′06″E
- Location of David Hasselhoff Museum

The David Hasselhoff Museum (or The Hoff Museum) is a museum dedicated to the American actor, singer, producer and businessman David Hasselhoff. It is located in the basement of the Circus Hostel in Mitte district of Berlin, Germany. It pays homage to 'arguably Germany's most famous non-German'.

The museum started on a small scale in 2008. In 2014, a more elaborate museum was created, which officially opened on March 6, 2015.

== Collection ==
Items and memorabilia in the museum include:

- A portrait and a mural of David Hasselhoff, the latter signed by himself. The mural can be considered the beginnings of the museum. It had originally a patch of breast hair, but the hairs were stolen by visitors as souvenirs.
- Knightrider paraphernalia, including a toy model of KITT, bought on eBay
- Baywatch paraphernalia
- A replica of the piano key scarf that Hasselhof wore during his 1989 performance at the Berlin Wall of the song Looking for Freedom
- A piece of the Berlin Wall
- A copy of the book Did David Hasselhoff End the Cold War? : Facts You Need to Know - YES he did, a parody title from the original Did David Hasselhoff End the Cold War? : 50 Facts You Need to Know - Europe by Emma Hartley

== Impression ==
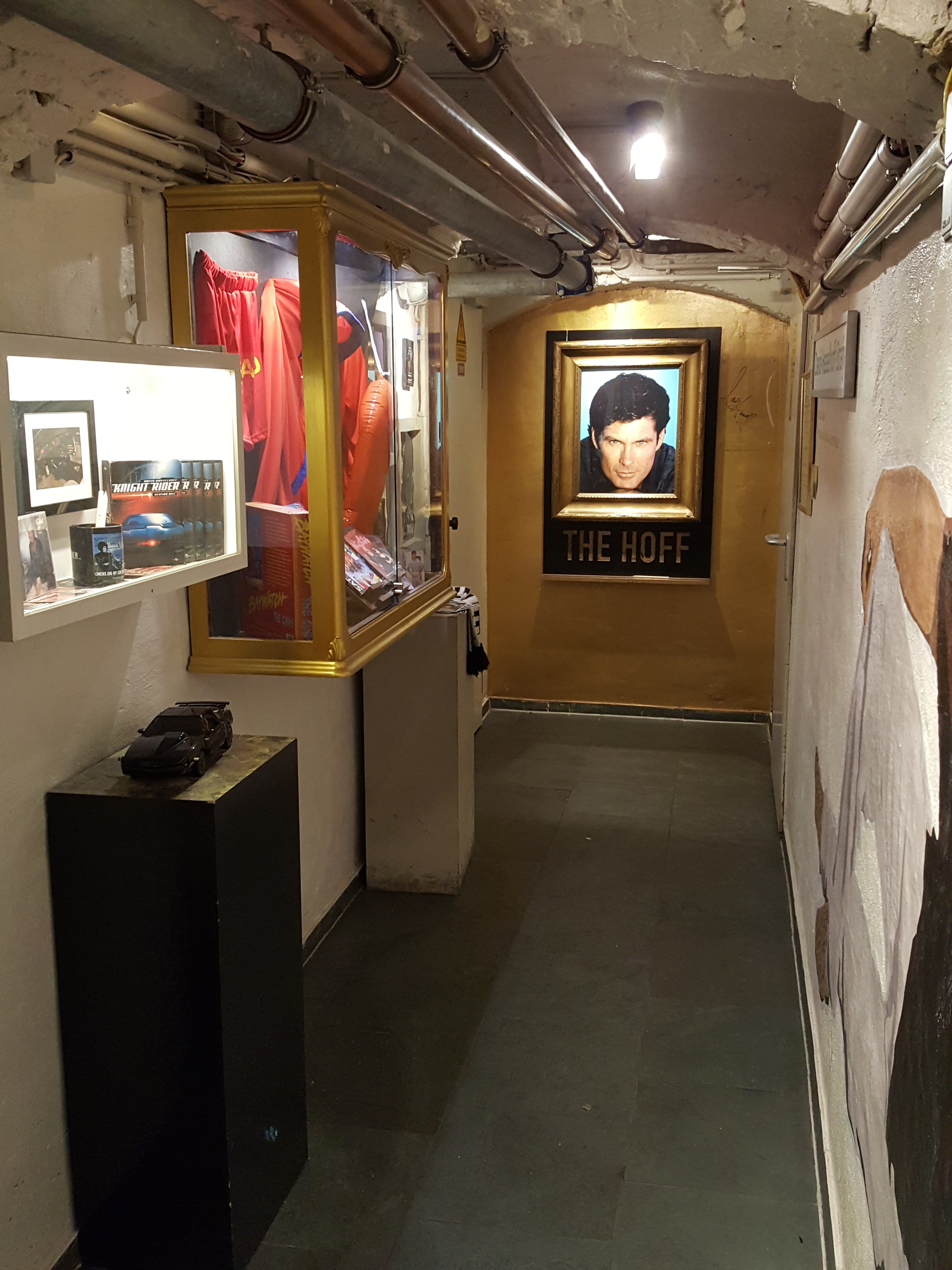
Overview of the museum

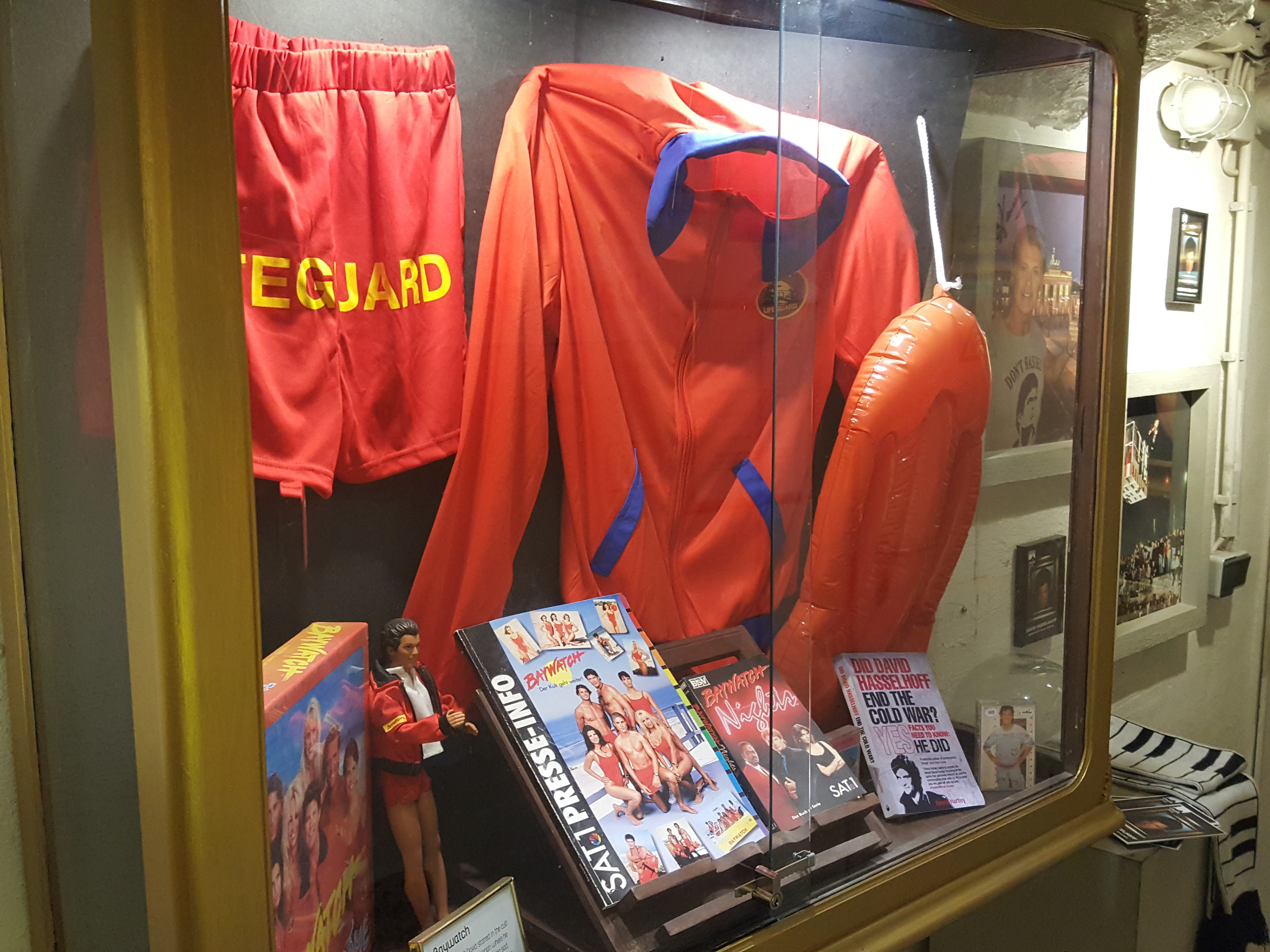
Display case

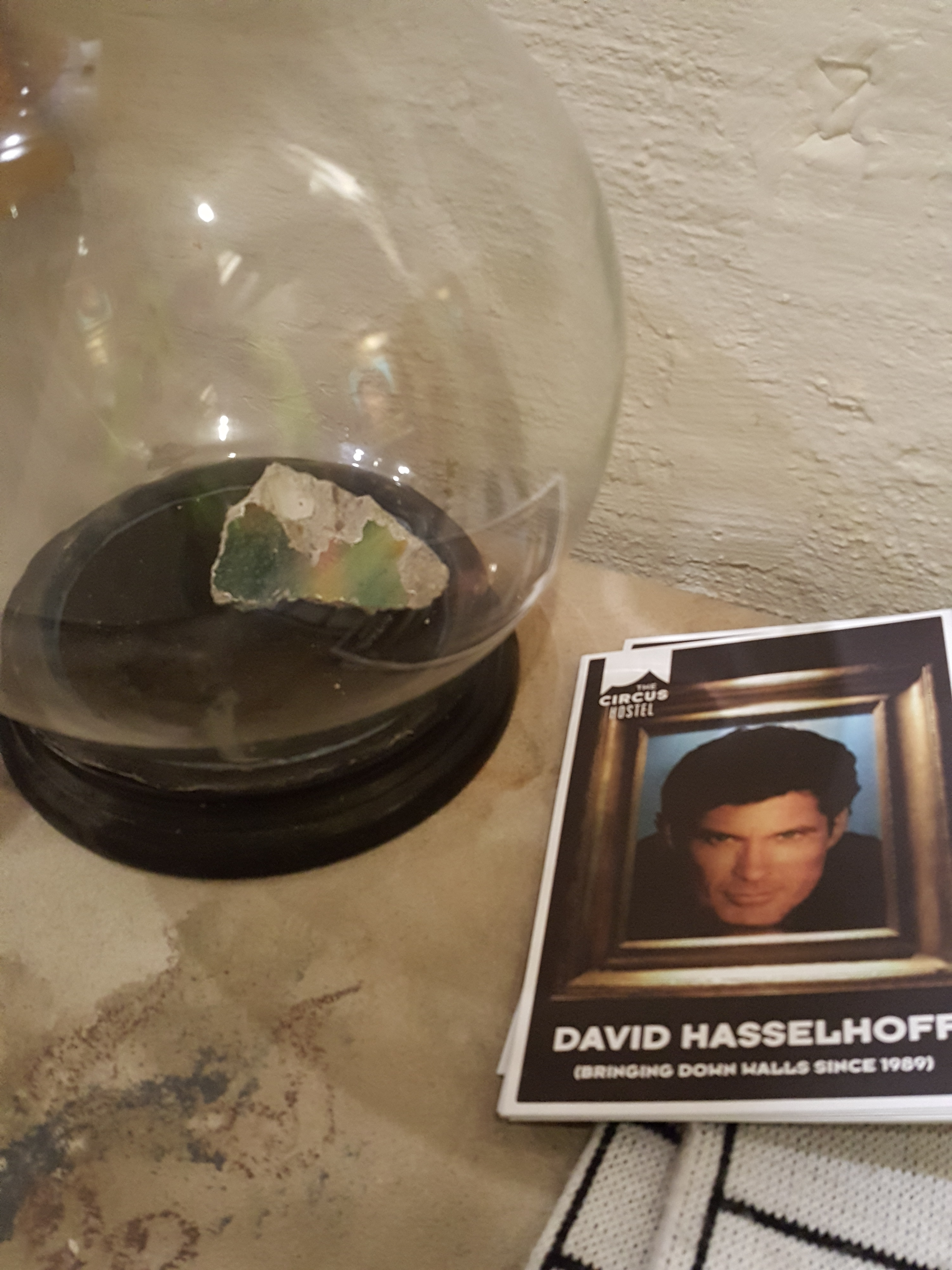
Piece of the Berlin Wall

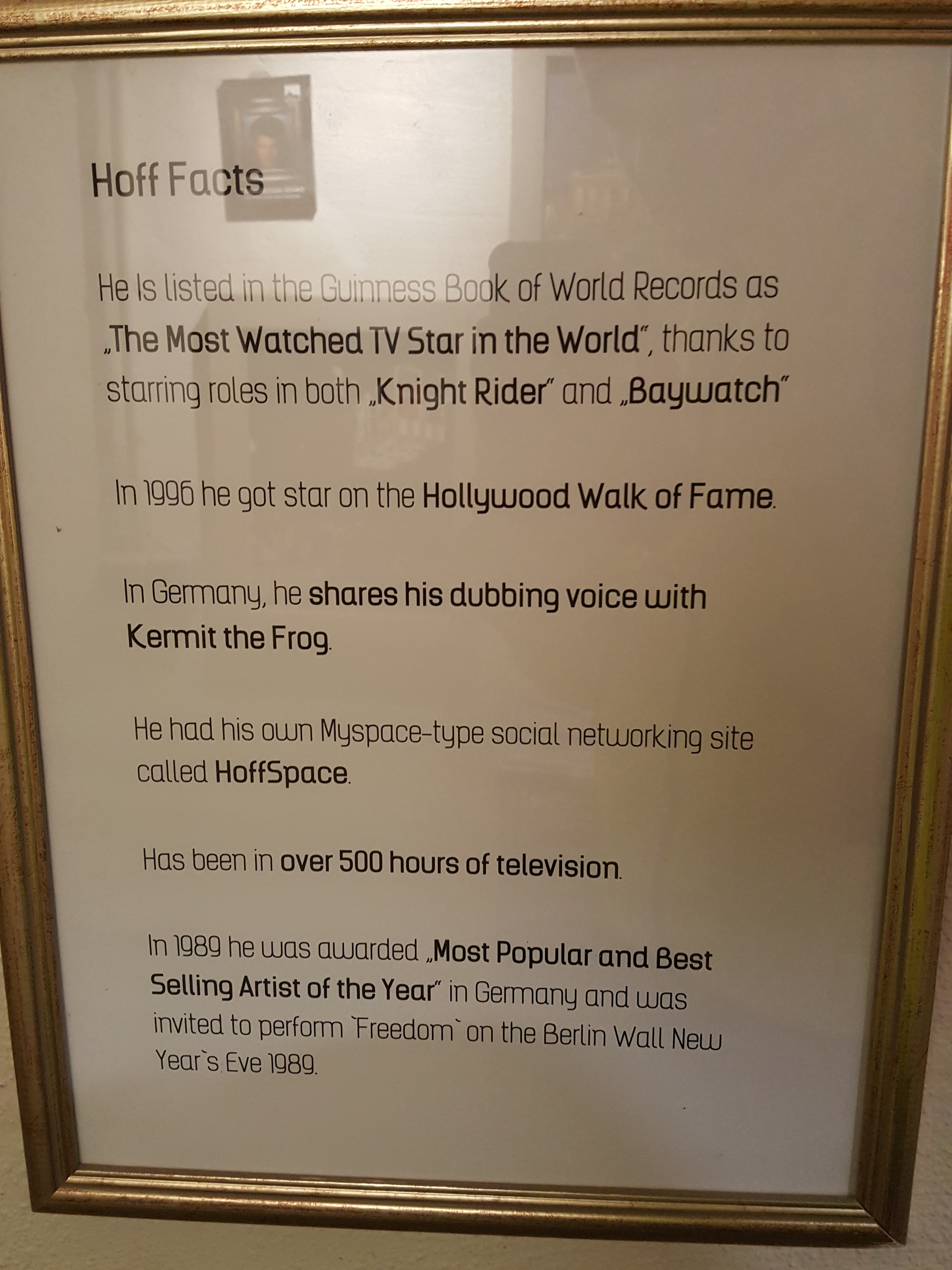
Facts about The Hoff
