= Spanish Eddie =

1985 single by Laura Branigan

Single by Laura Branigan

from the album Hold Me
- B-side: "Tenderness"
- Released: July 1985
- Recorded: 1985
- Genre: Eurodisco
- Length: 4:08
- Label: Atlantic
- Songwriters: David Palmer; Chuck Cochran
- Producer: Jack White

Laura Branigan singles chronology
"Satisfaction" (1984)	"Spanish Eddie" (1985)	"Hold Me" (1985)

Music video
- "Spanish Eddie" on YouTube

"Spanish Eddie" is a song by American singer Laura Branigan, released as the lead single from her fourth studio album, Hold Me (1985). The song was produced by Jack White and arranged by Harold Faltermeyer. Released in July 1985, the single became Branigan's sixth top-40 entry in the United States in two and a half years, peaking at number 40 on the Billboard Hot 100 and number 37 on the Cash Box singles chart. It also peaked at number 29 on the Billboard's Adult Contemporary chart, while a 12″ dance version reached number 26 on the Hot Dance Club Play chart.

"Spanish Eddie" fared better overseas, reaching number eight in Austria and number 11 in Sweden, while charting within the top 40 in Australia (number 24), Germany (number 36), and Canada (number 38). The song also charted in the United Kingdom at number 87.

== Track listings ==
- 7-inch single

A. "Spanish Eddie" – 4:10
B. "Tenderness" – 3:46

- 12-inch single

A. "Spanish Eddie" (extended remix) – 5:31
B1. "Tenderness" (extended remix) – 5:50
B2. "Spanish Eddie" – 4:10

== Charts ==
Chart performance for "Spanish Eddie"
Chart (1985–1986)	Peak position
Australia (Kent Music Report)	24
Austria (Ö3 Austria Top 40)	8
Canada Top Singles (RPM)	38
South Africa (Springbok Radio)	6
Sweden (Sverigetopplistan)	11
UK Singles (Official Charts)	87
US Billboard Hot 100	40
US Adult Contemporary (Billboard)	29
US Dance Club Songs (Billboard)	26
US Dance Singles Sales (Billboard)	27
US Cash Box Top 100 Singles	37
West Germany (GfK)	36
Canada Adult Contemporary (RPM)	25
Quebec (ADISQ)	22
Europe (European Hot 100 Singles)	89

== Cover versions ==
- 1985: Wencke Myhre recorded the song in German as "Die Nacht als der Himmel Feuer fing".
- 1992: Tony Christie covered the song (also produced by Jack White) for his album Welcome to My Music 2.
