= Hearts in Motion =

1986 studio album by Air Supply

Studio album by Air Supply
- Released: August 1986
- Recorded: 1985–1986
- Studios: Record Plant and Sound City Studios (Los Angeles, California); Bill Schnee Studios (North Hollywood, California); Cherokee Studios and Conway Studios (Hollywood, California); Recorders (Cherokee, California); Electric Lady Studios (New York City, New York)
- Genre: Soft rock
- Length: 44:31
- Label: Arista
- Producers: Bernard Edwards; John Boylan

Air Supply chronology
Air Supply (1985)	Hearts in Motion (1986)	The Christmas Album (1987)

Singles from Hearts in Motion
- 1. "Lonely Is the Night" Released: July 1986; 2. "One More Chance" Released: October 1986; 3. "Stars in Your Eyes" Released: February 1987

Professional ratings
Review scores
Source	Rating
AllMusic	2/5 stars

Hearts in Motion is the ninth studio album by British-Australian soft rock duo Air Supply, released in 1986. The album was a serious step down in the band's popularity. While their previous self-titled album had charted gold, Hearts in Motion did not attain any certification, peaking at No. 84 on the US charts.

The album did not possess any successful singles, except for the minor hit "Lonely Is the Night" (#76 U.S.), which became a favourite among the band's repertoire.

== Track listing ==
All tracks are written by Graham Russell, except where noted.

Side One
No.	Title	Writer(s)	Length
1.	"It's Not Too Late"		3:48
2.	"Lonely Is the Night"	Albert Hammond, Diane Warren*	4:13
3.	"Put Love in Your Life"		4:25
4.	"One More Chance"	Steve George, John Lang, Richard Page*	3:54
5.	"Stars in Your Eyes"		3:46

Side Two
No.	Title	Writer(s)	Length
1.	"My Heart's with You"	Russell, Warren	4:34
2.	"I'd Die for You"		4:45
3.	"You're Only in Love"		4:15
4.	"Time for Love"	Randy Stern, Anthony La Peau	2:46
5.	"Heart and Soul"		3:54
6.	"Hope Springs Eternal"		4:11
Total length:			44:31

Notes

- Starred (*) songs produced by John Boylan; all others produced by Bernard Edwards.

== Personnel ==
Air Supply

- Russell Hitchcock – vocals
- Graham Russell – vocals, guitars

=== Credits (Tracks 1, 3 & 5–11) ===
Musicians

- Jeff Bova – keyboards, Kurzweil K250 programming
- Eddie Martinez – guitars, backing vocals
- Chris P. Rice – additional guitars (3)
- Bernard Edwards – bass
- Tony Thompson – drums
- Michael Gibbs – string arrangements and conductor
- Roy Galloway – additional backing vocals
- Phil Perry – additional backing vocals
- Darryl Phinessee – additional backing vocals
- Bill Ballou – additional backing vocals (6)
- Fonzi Thornton – additional backing vocals (6)

Recording

- Josh Abbey – main engineer
- Scott Church, Craig Engel and Dan Garcia – second engineers
- Bruce Buchalter – assistant engineer at Electric Lady Studios (New York, New York, NY).
- Recording studios – Record Plant (Los Angeles, CA); Bill Schnee Studios (Hollywood, CA); Recorders (Cherokee, CA); Electric Lady Studios (New York, NY).

=== Credits (Tracks 2 & 4) ===
Musicians

- John Capek – keyboards
- Michael Landau – guitars
- Mike Botts – percussion
- Timothy B. Schmit – additional backing vocals

Recording

- Paul Grupp – engineer
- Brett Newman – assistant engineer
- Recorded at Sound City Studios (Los Angeles, CA).
- Mixed at Conway Recording Studios (Hollywood, CA).
- Richard McKernan – mix assistant

=== Miscellaneous ===
- Clive Davis – executive producer
- Howard Fritzon – art direction
- Aaron Rapoport – cover photography
- Philip Saltonstall – inner sleeve photography
- Harveys – Naguchi coffee table
- Wendy Tamkin – hair, make-up
- Robert Trachtenberg – stylist
