= Looking for Freedom (album) =

- German cover art

Studio album by David Hasselhoff
- Released: June 21, 1989
- Studio: Smash Tonstudio, Cool Cat Studio, Michael Boddicker, Inc. Recording Studios, Image Recording Studios, Hansa Ton Studios
- Genre: Pop; pop rock; Europop
- Length: 51:06
- Label: White; Ariola; BMG
- Producer: Jack White

David Hasselhoff chronology
Lovin' Feelings (1987)	Looking for Freedom (1989)	Knight Lover (1989)

David Hasselhoff studio album chronology
Lovin' Feelings (1987)	Looking for Freedom (1989)	Crazy for You (1990)

Singles from Looking for Freedom
- 1. "Looking for Freedom" Released: December 1988; 2. "Is Everybody Happy" Released: June 1989; 3. "Song of the Night" Released: July 1989; 4. "Flying on the Wings of Tenderness" Released: September 1989; 5. "Torero - Te Quiero" Released: 1989; 6. "Lonely is the Night" Released: 1989; 7. "Je T'Aime Means I Love You" Released: 1990

Music video
- "Looking For Freedom" on YouTube

Looking for Freedom is the third studio album by American actor and singer David Hasselhoff, released on June 21, 1989, by White Records. It was produced by German music producer Jack White and features writing from White, Charles Blackwell, Mark Spiro and Diane Warren, among others. The album includes Hasselhoff's biggest hit, "Looking for Freedom", which was a major chart hit in Europe, reaching number one in Germany, Austria and Switzerland.

== Background and release ==
Though Hasselhoff's first two albums Night Rocker (1985) and Lovin' Feelings (1987) failed to achieve success in the United States, both albums were very successful in Europe due to the popularity of Knight Rider, series in which Hasselhoff starred at that time. Following his first headlining tour across Austria in 1987, Hasselhoff began working with German music producer Jack White, who previously worked with several recording artists, including Laura Branigan, Paul Anka and Barry Manilow. Their first collaboration was the song "Looking for Freedom", which was written by White and Gary Cowtan, and was first recorded and released in 1978 by German singer Marc Seaberg, and later released that year on its German version, titled "Auf der Straße nach Süden" and performed by German pop singer Tony Marshall. White produced the song for a third time, with Hasselhoff's version being more popular than the original.

On June 21, 1989, Hasselhoff released his third studio album under the name Looking for Freedom, due to the song's massive success in Germany, after spending eight consecutive weeks at number one. The album was re-released that year under the title Lonely Is the Night, which was also the name of one of the tracks from Looking for Freedom. This version contains 10 of its 13 original tracks, with the songs "Lady", "Avignon" and "After Manana Mi Ciello" not being included.

== Promotion ==
To promote the album, Hasselhoff embarked on several TV shows across Germany. Hasselhoff performed "Looking for Freedom" for the first time on Hitparade, aired on March 22, 1989. Three months later, Hasselhoff returned to Hitparade and performed "Looking for Freedom" for the second time, as well as received a Gold certification for the song. Other performances includes: Peters Pop Show, Na Siehste! and his performance at the Berlin Wall on New Year's Eve 1989.

Additionally, Hasselhoff embarked on his second headlining tour, the Freedom Tour, which took place across Germany and Switzerland between April and May 1990.

== Singles ==
The album's lead single, which became the title track, was released in late 1988. It remains Hasselhoff's biggest hit, as well as his signature song, reaching number one in Germany, Switzerland and Austria, and becoming the best-performing single of 1989 in the former two countries. Additionally, it reached the top-twenty in France and Belgium; and the top-forty in the Netherlands. Eventually, the song was certified Platinum in Germany.

"Is Everybody Happy" was released as the follow-up single. The song continued its success, reaching the top-ten in Germany and Switzerland.

Other singles includes: "Song of the Night", "Lonely is the Night", "Je T'Aime Means I Love You", "Torero - Te Quiero" and "Flying on the Wings of Tenderness", with the latter reaching number 22 in Germany.

== Commercial performance ==
In Austria, the album debuted at number 17 on the Austrian Albums chart, during the week of October 1, 1989, peaking at number five on its third week, and spent 21 total weeks on the chart. In Switzerland, the album debuted at number six on the Swiss Albums chart issue dated September 24, 1989, peaking at number three on its fifth week, remaining in that position for seven non-consecutive weeks, and spent 21 total weeks on the chart. In Germany, the album debuted at number 47 during the week of September 25, 1989, peaking at number five on its eighth week, and spent a total of 44 weeks on the German charts.

Looking for Freedom proved to be even more successful in Europe than his first two albums. Due to the continued success of "Looking for Freedom", the album became a commercial success in Europe, which was certified Platinum in Germany and Austria; and three-times Platinum in Switzerland.

== Track listing ==
Vinyl/cassette Side A
No.	Title	Writer(s)	Length
1.	"Is Everybody Happy"	Jack White; Charles Blackwell	4:28
2.	"Lonely Is the Night"	Albert Hammond; Diane Warren	3:26
3.	"Je T'Aime Means I Love You"	White; Blackwell; Jerry Rix	4:09
4.	"Sheltered Heart"	Warren	4:44
5.	"Torero - Te Quiero"	White; Mark Spiro	4:01
6.	"Yesterday's Love"	White; Spiro	4:17

Side B
No.	Title	Writer(s)	Length
1.	"Looking for Freedom"	White; Gary Cowtan	3:56
2.	"Flying on the Wings of Tenderness"	White; Rix	3:50
3.	"Lady"	White; Spiro	3:48
4.	"Song of the Night"	White; Barry Mason; Norbert Hammerschmidt	3:59
5.	"Avignon"	Blackwell; Bernd Dietrich; Engelbert Simons; Gerd Grabowski	3:40
6.	"After Manana Mi Ciello"	White; Paolo Palermo	3:19
7.	"Amore Amore (Elisabeth)"	White; Mason	3:34

== Charts and certifications ==
=== Weekly charts ===
Chart (1989–1990)	Peak position
Austrian Albums (Ö3 Austria)	5
European Albums (Music & Media)	18
German Albums (Offizielle Top 100)	5
Swiss Albums (Schweizer Hitparade)	3

=== Year-end charts ===
Chart (1990)	Position
German Albums (Offizielle Top 100)	31

=== Certifications ===
Region	Certification	Certified units/sales
Austria (IFPI Austria)	Platinum	50,000^{*}
Germany (BVMI)	Platinum	500,000^{^}
Switzerland (IFPI Switzerland)	3× Platinum	150,000^{^}
^{*} Sales figures based on certification alone.^{^} Shipments figures based on certification alone.
