= Hold Me (Laura Branigan album) =

1985 studio album by Laura Branigan

Studio album by Laura Branigan
- Released: July 15, 1985
- Studios: Image Recording (Hollywood, California); Can-Am Recorders (Tarzana, California); Westlake (West Hollywood, California); Bodifications (Los Angeles, California); Preferred Sound (Woodland Hills, California)
- Genres: Pop rock; dance-pop; synth-pop
- Length: 39:47
- Label: Atlantic
- Producers: Jack White; Harold Faltermeyer; Mark Spiro

Laura Branigan chronology
Self Control (1984)	Hold Me (1985)	Touch (1987)

Singles from Hold Me
- 1. "Spanish Eddie" Released: July 1985; 2. "Hold Me" Released: 1985; 3. "Maybe Tonight" Released: 1985; 4. "I Found Someone" Released: February 7, 1986

Professional ratings
Review scores
Source	Rating
AllMusic	3/5 stars

Hold Me is the fourth studio album by American singer Laura Branigan, released on July 15, 1985, by Atlantic Records. The album peaked at number 71 on the US Billboard 200, though it fared better internationally, reaching the top 10 in Sweden and Switzerland, and the top 15 in Norway.

The album's lead single, "Spanish Eddie", earned Branigan her sixth top-40 entry in two and a half years, peaking at number 40 on the Billboard Hot 100, and was moderately successful outside the United States. Subsequent singles "Hold Me" and "I Found Someone" failed to make an impact, peaking at numbers 82 and 90 on the Billboard Hot 100, respectively. Nevertheless, "Hold Me" reached number 39 on Billboard's Hot Dance/Disco Club Play chart, while "I Found Someone" reached number 25 on the Hot Adult Contemporary chart.

The track "When the Heat Hits the Streets" was used in a television advertising campaign for the Chrysler Laser, with Chrysler serving as a sponsor for Branigan's 1985–1986 Hold Me tour (a Chrysler Laser was prominently displayed in the "Spanish Eddie" music video).

According to Branigan, she said "the album is such a growth from my other albums. I really feel it’s the direction I want to go. My voice is definitely stronger and the material is just incredible. I honestly don't feel there are any fillers."

== Reception ==
In their review of the album, Billboard commented that "Branigan's latest includes several tracks by co-producer Harold Faltermeyer, giving the collection an added edge beyond the mainstream ballads and rockers that have characterized her earlier recordings. First single is "Spanish Eddie," but the album should produce several other successful tracks, most notably "Hold Me" and "When I'm With You."

Cashbox noted that "Laura Branigan's fourth LP for Atlantic combines all of the elements that have brought her a handful of hit singles, from uptempo dance oriented tunes such as this album’s first single, the melodic and colorful “Spanish Eddie,” to beautiful ballads like “Forever Young.” Producer Jack White and other contributors like Harold Faltermeyer have chosen some excellent material here and Branigan shines on every cut."

Allmusic were more mixed in their review, stating that "Laura Branigan began to falter in her quest to be the white, '80s Donna Summer with her fourth album, which failed to scale the sales heights of her first three, despite another clutch of dramatic, heavily produced Eurodisco tracks, three of which found their way onto the singles charts. The closest thing to a hit was "Spanish Eddie" (this album's remake of her first smash, "Gloria"), a song with an odd street-life lyric that made reference to Bob Dylan's "Desolation Row"...Elsewhere, Branigan again turned to songwriter Michael Bolton for "I Found Someone," and as she had with "How Am I Supposed To Live Without You," did it much better than its author, for what it's worth. But on the whole, Hold Me found The Branigan formula growing stale."

== Track listing ==
Side one
No.	Title	Writer(s)	Producer(s)	Length
1.	"Hold Me"	Beth Andersen; Bill Bodine	Jack White; Harold Faltermeyer	4:43
2.	"Maybe Tonight"	White; Mark Spiro	White; Spiro^{[a]}	3:37
3.	"Foolish Lullaby"	White; Spiro	White; Spiro^{[a]}	4:18
4.	"Spanish Eddie"	David Palmer; Chuck Cochran	White	4:08
5.	"Forever Young"	Marian Gold; Frank Mertens; Bernhard Lloyd	White	3:52

Side two
No.	Title	Writer(s)	Producer(s)	Length
6.	"When I'm with You"	White; Spiro; Faltermeyer	White; Spiro^{[a]}	4:12
7.	"I Found Someone"	Michael Bolton; Mark Mangold	White; Faltermeyer	4:00
8.	"Sanctuary"	Gary Usher; Tom Kelly	White	3:32
9.	"Tenderness"	White; Spiro; Laura Branigan	White; Spiro^{[a]}	3:42
10.	"When the Heat Hits the Streets"	Linda Schreyer; Cappy Capossela	Spiro	3:43
Total length:				39:47

=== Notes ===
- ^{^[a]} signifies an associate producer

== Personnel ==
Credits adapted from the liner notes of Hold Me.

=== Musicians ===
- Laura Branigan – vocals
- Harold Faltermeyer – arrangements (tracks 1, 4, 6, 7); all keyboards and synthesizers (including programming, electronic drums and bass)
- Mark Spiro – arrangements (tracks 2, 3, 6, 9, 10); all keyboards and synthesizers (including programming, electronic drums and bass), background vocals
- Eddie Arkin – arrangements (tracks 2, 3, 6, 9); all keyboards and synthesizers (including programming, electronic drums and bass)
- Tom Keane – arrangements (track 5)
- Gary Usher – arrangements (track 8)
- Jerry Hey – horn arrangement, horn (track 9); flugelhorn (track 6)
- Dann Huff, Michael Landau, Craig T. Cooper – guitars
- Gary Herbig, Marc Russo – saxophone solos
- Gary Grant, Larry Williams, Bill Reichenbach Jr. – horns (track 9)
- Nathan Alford Jr. – percussion
- Brian Malouf – percussion, all keyboards and synthesizers (including programming, electronic drums and bass)
- Nathan East, Larry Ball – bass
- Bo Tomlyn, Michael Boddicker, Alan J. Pasqua, Steve Williams, Richard Ruttenberg, Michael Egizi, Michael Mason – all keyboards and synthesizers (including programming, electronic drums and bass)
- James Ingram, Jon Joyce, Richard Page, Joe Pizzulo, Jim Haas, Tom Kelly, Phillip Ingram, Beth Andersen, Maxine Anderson, Leslie Spiro, Kelly Bruss, Edie Lehmann, Andrea Robinson, Rod Burton, Kevin Dorsey, Tommy Funderburk, Kyle Henderson, George Merrill, Susan Boyd, Rosemary Butler, Jill Colucci, Angie Jaree – background vocals

=== Technical ===
- Jürgen Koppers, Brian Malouf, John Kovarek, Brian Reeves, John Van Nest, Ed Thacker, Dave Concors, Tom Whitlock, David Devore – engineering
- Steve Krause, Rick Butz, Peggy McAffee, Samii Taylor – engineering assistance
- Jürgen Koppers – mixing (Note: Mixed at Image Recording (Hollywood, California))
- Brian Gardner – mastering (Note: Mastered at Bernie Grundman Mastering (Hollywood, California))
- Jack White – production (tracks 1–9)
- Harold Faltermeyer – production (tracks 1, 7)
- Mark Spiro – associate production (tracks 2, 3, 6, 9); production (track 10)

=== Artwork ===
- Aaron Rapoport – photography
- Bob Defrin – art direction

== Charts ==
=== Weekly charts ===
Weekly chart performance for Hold Me
Chart (1985)	Peak position
Australian Albums (Kent Music Report)	37
Canada Top Albums/CDs (RPM)	43
European Albums (Music & Media)	26
Finnish Albums (Suomen virallinen lista)	22
German Albums (Offizielle Top 100)	31
Japanese Albums (Oricon)	75
Norwegian Albums (VG-lista)	12
Swedish Albums (Sverigetopplistan)	7
Swiss Albums (Schweizer Hitparade)	10
UK Albums (Official Charts)	64
US Billboard 200	71
US Cash Box Top 200 Albums	65

=== Year-end charts ===
Year-end chart performance for Hold Me
Chart (1985)	Position
Norwegian Summer Period Albums (VG-lista)	17
