= Hold Me (Laura Branigan song) =

1985 single by Laura Branigan

Single by Laura Branigan

from the album Hold Me
- B-side: "Tenderness"
- Released: 1985
- Genre: Sophisti-pop; synth-pop
- Length: 4:15
- Label: Atlantic Records
- Songwriters: Beth Andersen; Bill Bodine
- Producers: Jack White; Harold Faltermeyer

Laura Branigan singles chronology
"Spanish Eddie" (1985)	"Hold Me" (1985)	"Maybe Tonight" (1985)

Audio
- "Hold Me" on YouTube

"Hold Me" is a song by the American pop singer Laura Branigan, which was released in 1985 as the second single from her fourth studio album Hold Me. It was written by Bill Bodine and Beth Andersen, and produced by Jack White and Harold Faltermeyer.

Following the top 40 success of the first single from Hold Me, "Spanish Eddie", "Hold Me" was released as the follow-up single. It reached No. 82 on the U.S. Billboard Hot 100 chart and No. 39 on the Billboard Dance/Club Play chart.

== Release ==
"Hold Me" was released on both 7" and 12" vinyl in North America and on 7" vinyl in Japan. The B-side for the North American 7" releases was "Tenderness", which was taken from Hold Me. The Japanese release featured a different track from the album, "When the Heat Hits the Streets". For release as a single, "Hold Me" was edited, removing around half a minute from its duration. An American 7" promotional single was also issued, featuring "Hold Me (Edited Version of Remix)" as the A-side and "Hold Me (New Extended Remix)" as the B-side, both remixed by American producer Beau Hill.

The American 12" vinyl featured "Hold Me (Vocal/New Extended Remix)" as the A-side, with "Tenderness (Vocal/Extended Remix Version)" and "Spanish Eddie (Vocal/Extended Remix Version)" as the two B-sides. An American 12" promotional single featured "Hold Me (Vocal/New Extended Remix)" on both sides of the vinyl.

== Promotion ==
No music video was filmed to promote the single. Branigan performed the song on American music TV show Solid Gold, and Dick Clark's Nitetime.

== Critical reception ==
Upon release, Billboard listed the song as a dance pick and commented: "A straight-ahead, American-sounding rock ballad; more booming beat boxes, less exotica than her usual repertoire." Cash Box wrote: "An urgent ballad with a surging rock feel, "Hold Me" showcases the Branigan voice in all its many textured volume. With sharp hooks and a hummable melody, the tune could mean another chart racer for one of pop's favorite singers."

== Track listing ==
7" single (US release)

1. "Hold Me" - 4:15
2. "Tenderness" - 3:42

7" Single (US promo)

1. "Hold Me (Edited Version of Remix)" - 4:15
2. "Hold Me (New Extended Remix)" - 5:16

7" Single (Japanese release)

1. "Hold Me" - 4:14
2. "When the Heat Hits the Streets" - 3:42

7" Single (Japanese promo)

1. "Hold Me" - 4:13
2. "When the Heat Hits the Streets" - 3:40

12" Single (US release)

1. "Hold Me (Vocal/New Extended Remix)" - 5:16
2. "Tenderness (Vocal/Extended Remix Version)" - 5:50
3. "Spanish Eddie (Vocal/Extended Remix Version)" - 5:31

12" Single (US promo)

1. "Hold Me (Vocal/New Extended Remix)" - 5:16
2. "Hold Me (Vocal/New Extended Remix)" - 5:16

== Personnel ==
- Jack White - producer of "Hold Me", arranger on "Tenderness"
- Harold Faltermeyer - producer of "Hold Me", arranger on "Hold Me", arranger on "Spanish Eddie"
- Mark Spiro - producer of "When the Heat Hits the Streets", associate producer on "Tenderness", arranger on "Tenderness"
- Ed Arkin - arranger on "Tenderness"
- Jerry Hey - horns arrangement on "Tenderness"
- Beau Hill - remixes of "Hold Me"

== Charts ==
Chart (1985)	Peak position
US Billboard Hot 100	82
US Dance Club Songs (Billboard)	39
US Cash Box Top 100 Singles	79
