= Lonely Is the Night (Air Supply song) =

1986 single by Air Supply

Single by Air Supply

from the album Hearts in Motion
- Released: 1986
- Recorded: 1986
- Genre: Soft rock
- Length: 4:12
- Label: Arista
- Songwriters: Albert Hammond; Diane Warren
- Producer: John Boylan

Air Supply singles chronology
| "The Power of Love (You Are My Lady)" (1985) | "Lonely Is the Night" (1986) | "One More Chance" (1986) |

"Lonely Is the Night" is a song by Australian-British band Air Supply, released in 1986, as the lead single from their ninth studio album, Hearts in Motion (1986). The ballad was written by Albert Hammond and Diane Warren, while John Boylan produced it. "Lonely Is the Night" was a minor success in the United States, reaching number 76 on the Billboard Hot 100 but found better success on the Adult Contemporary chart, reaching at number 12.

== Composition and lyrics ==
"Lonely Is the Night" was written by Albert Hammond with songwriter Diane Warren, while production was done by John Boylan. Lyrically, the song talks about the difficulty of dealing with a long-distance relationship. In the beginning, Russell Hitchcock sings that he thought he'd live well without his girlfriend, "Really thought that I could live without you, Really thought that I could make it on my own," he sings. However, he realizes that he's lost without the one he loves, "Now I'm so lost without you, now you're not here and now I know." In the chorus, he sings about how difficult it is to spend the night away from his love. "Lonely is the night when I'm not with you, lonely is the night ain't no light shining through, till you're in my arms till you're here by my side, lonely am I."

== Release and reception ==
"Lonely Is the Night" was released as the first single from Air Supply's ninth studio album, Hearts in Motion (1986). The song was affiliated with the grand opening of Nancy's Golden Needle store in Evansville, Indiana in the fall of 1986. The song was later included on their compilation Ultimate Collection, released in 2000. Later, the song was included on 2002's Best of Air Supply. In 2004, the song was included on the compilation Platinum & Gold Collection, while in 2005, "Lonely Is the Night" was the opening song of the second disc of their compilation, Forever Love: 36 Greatest Hits 1980-2001.

Finally, the song made the cut on their 2006 compilation Collections, on their 2007 compilation The Best of Air Supply: Ones That You Love and on their 2009 compilation, The Collection. While reviewing the compilation The Collection, Jason Lymangrover of AllMusic referred to the song as "obscure."

Despite the song's popularity outside North America, the band did not include this song on their setlists on subsequent tours after their appearance at the Viña del Mar International Song Festival in 1987.

== Chart performance ==
In the United States, "Lonely Is the Night" spent 8 weeks on the Billboard Hot 100 chart, peaking at number 76, in 1986. To date, "Lonely Is the Night" is both the lowest-charting single from the band as well as the band's most recent song to reach the Billboard Hot 100. On the Adult Contemporary chart, the song fared better, peaking at number 12, and remaining on the chart for eleven weeks.

== Music video ==
The song's official video, which features the duo and their band performing the song in front of a crowd, was filmed at the Grand Olympic Auditorium in Los Angeles, California, during the band's United States leg of their Hearts in Motion tour. However, the brief close-up shots of their then-touring drummer Ralph Cooper were filmed at The Forum in a separate concert.

In addition to Lonely Is the Night, the music video of "One More Chance" also used the same stage design and venue.

== Track listing ==
1. "Lonely Is the Night" – 4:12
2. "I'd Die for You" – 3:48

== Charts ==
| Chart (1986–1987) | Peak position |
|---|---|
| Canada Adult Contemporary (RPM) | 4 |
| Canada Top Singles (RPM) | 83 |
| UK (Official Charts Company) | 168 |
| US Billboard Hot 100 | 76 |
| US Adult Contemporary (Billboard) | 12 |

== Cover versions ==
- Dutch singer Jerry Rix covered the song on his 1989 album Jerry Rix Sings Diane Warren - Nothing's Gonna Stop Us Now.
- American singer and actor David Hasselhoff included the song on his 1989 album Looking for Freedom.
- American singer Lory Bianco released a cover of the song on her 1990 album Lonely Is The Night. It was released as a single, but failed to chart.
- Swedish singer Zemya Hamilton released her version as the b-side to her 1990 single "Going Through The Motions".
