= Looking for Freedom (song) =

1978 single by Marc Seaberg

Single by Marc Seaberg

from the album California Gold
- B-side: "Shorty"
- Released: August 1978
- Genre: Pop, soft rock
- Length: 3:54
- Label: Ariola
- Songwriters: Jack White; Gary Cowtan
- Producer: Jack White

Marc Seaberg singles chronology
"Looking for Freedom" (1978)	"California Gold (Part 1 & 2)" (1979)

Music video
- "Looking for Freedom" on YouTube

"Auf der Straße nach Süden"

Single by Tony Marshall

from the album Meine Wunschmelodien
- Language: German
- English title: On the South Road
- B-side: "Egal, wohin der Wind uns weht"
- Released: November 1978
- Genre: Pop, soft rock
- Length: 3:55
- Label: Ariola
- Songwriters: Jack White; Jon Athan
- Producer: Jack White

Tony Marshall singles chronology
"Bora Bora" (1978)	"Auf der Straße nach Süden" (1978)	"Ich will mit dir spielen " (1979)

Audio
- "Auf Der Straße nach Süden" on YouTube

"Looking for Freedom" is a song written by German music producer Jack White, originally released in 1978 by German singer Marc Seaberg and featured on his 1979 album California Gold. It was covered in German later that year under the title "Auf der Straße nach Süden" by Tony Marshall. Both versions became hits in Germany.

Ten years later, American actor and singer David Hasselhoff covered the song as the lead single from his third studio album of the same name (1989). It became Hasselhoff's biggest international hit, reaching number one in Germany (for eight weeks), in Switzerland (for four weeks) and Austria (for one week). It also reached number four on the European Hot 100 Singles; the top-twenty in France and Belgium; and the top-forty in the Netherlands. "Looking for Freedom" was eventually certified platinum in Germany, and became the best-performing single of 1989 in Germany and Switzerland. White returned to produce both cover versions.

== Lyrics ==
The song is about a rich man's son who wants to make his own way in the world, rather than to have everything given to him. The composer is Jack White, and "Looking for Freedom" is the original title, with lyrics written by Gary Cowtan. It was already finished before Jon Athan began writing the German lyrics. The German version sung by Tony Marshall was released some weeks after the original version sung by Marc Seaberg, who was a new artist in 1978, whereas Tony Marshall was already an established star. Both of these versions, recorded at Hansa Studio 2 in Berlin, used the same instrumental tracks and some of these were again used on David Hasselhoff's 1989 version, which was completed in Los Angeles. All three versions were produced by Jack White.

== Chart performance ==
Marc Seaberg's original version peaked at number 16 in Germany (where it spent 13 weeks on the chart), and at number 18 in Austria.

== Tony Marshall version ==
In 1978, the song was covered in German by Tony Marshall under the name "Auf der Straße nach Süden" ("On the South Road") with lyrics written by Jon Athan. Marshall's version appeared as the closing track to his 1978 album Meine Wunschmelodien ("My Favorite Melodies"). The B-side to Marshall's version, "Egal, wohin der Wind uns weht" ("No Matter Where the Wind Blows Us") would later appear on his 1978 album Bora Bora.

=== Chart performance ===
Marshall's version peaked at number 41 on the German charts.

== David Hasselhoff version ==
"Looking for Freedom"

Single by David Hasselhoff

from the album Looking for Freedom
- Released: December 1988
- Length: 3:55
- Label: White
- Songwriters: Jack White; Gary Cowtan
- Producer: Jack White

David Hasselhoff singles chronology
"Night Rocker" (1987)	"Looking for Freedom" (1988)	"Is Everybody Happy" (1989)

Music video
- "Looking for Freedom" on YouTube

In 1988, American actor and singer David Hasselhoff covered the song as the lead single from his third studio album of the same name (1989). It became Hasselhoff's biggest international hit, reaching number one in West Germany (for eight weeks), in Switzerland (for four weeks) and Austria (for one week). It also reached number four on the European Hot 100 Singles; the top-twenty in France and Belgium; and the top-forty in the Netherlands. "Looking for Freedom" was eventually certified platinum in Germany and became the best-performing single of 1989 in West Germany and Switzerland and has been featured various times in popular culture.

=== Performance at Berlin Wall ===
Hasselhoff performed this song before throngs of pro-German reunification activists at the Berlin Wall on New Year's Eve 1989, mere weeks after the wall had begun to be taken down. Wearing a piano-keyboard scarf and a leather jacket covered in motion lights, Hasselhoff stood in a bucket crane and performed the song along with the crowd. Recordings of the ZDF TV broadcast resurfaced in the late 1990s and nowadays can be found on YouTube. On a later tour of Germany in 2004, Hasselhoff would lament that a photo of him was lacking from the Checkpoint Charlie Museum in Berlin.

=== Chart performance ===
Hasselhoff's version became a huge success across Europe. It debuted at number 12 on the West German charts (during the week of 20 March 1989), reaching the top spot on its third week, spending eight consecutive weeks at number one, and remained on the chart for a total of 25 weeks. It ended as the best-performing single of 1989 in the country, and it was certified platinum. In Switzerland, the song debuted at number seven (during the week of 16 April 1989), reaching the top spot on its third week, spending four consecutive weeks at number one, remaining on the chart for a total of 32 weeks, and later becoming the best-performing single of 1989 in the country. In Austria, it debuted at number eight (during the week of April 15, 1989) and reached number one on its third week, spending a total of 18 weeks on the chart, and becoming the fifth best-performing single of 1989, and the 54th best-performing song of the '80s decade in the country. Additionally, the song peaked at number 12 in France and remained for a total of 12 weeks; in Belgium, it peaked at number 18 and remained for a total of 16 weeks; and in the Netherlands, it peaked at number 31, remaining on the chart for 14 weeks. It also reached number four on the European Hot 100 Singles.

=== Track listings ===
7-inch single

1. "Looking for Freedom" — 3:55
2. "Looking for Freedom" (instrumental) — 3:55

CD and 12-inch maxi

1. "Looking for Freedom" (maxi version — vocal) — 5:32
2. "Looking for Freedom" (single version — vocal) — 3:55
3. "Looking for Freedom" (single version — instrumental) — 3:55

=== Charts ===
==== Weekly charts ====
Chart (1988–1989)	Peak position
Austria (Ö3 Austria Top 40)	1
Belgium (Ultratop 50 Flanders)	18
Europe (European Hot 100 Singles)	4
France (SNEP)	12
Netherlands (Dutch Top 40)	22
Netherlands (Single Top 100)	31
Switzerland (Schweizer Hitparade)	1
West Germany (GfK)	1

==== Year-end charts ====
Chart (1989)	Position
Austria (Ö3 Austria Top 40)	5
Belgium (Ultratop)	49
Europe (European Hot 100 Singles)	18
Switzerland (Schweizer Hitparade)	1
West Germany (Media Control)	1

==== Decade-end charts ====
Chart (1980–1989)	Position
Austria (Ö3 Austria Top 40)	54

=== Certifications and sales ===
Region	Certification	Certified units/sales
Germany (BVMI)	Platinum	500,000^{^}
^{^} Shipments figures based on certification alone.

== In popular culture ==
- In 2006, German basketball player Dirk Nowitzki joked that he hums the song before free throws.
- In a commercial for Norwegian telephone company Telenor's "Djuice Freedom" subscription plan, David Hasselhoff is shown singing the song, with a voiceover that says, "David Hasselhoff is looking for freedom, Are you?".
- The song plays on the car stereo in 2012's Cloud Atlas as Jim Broadbent's Timothy Cavendish flees a tyrannical nursing home in one of the segments directed by German Tom Tykwer.
- Moone Boy's Martin Moone and his imaginary friend (played by Chris O'Dowd) dance to it on their own wall as the live transmission of the fall of the Berlin Wall plays on television, ending the episode "Another Prick in the Wall" also from 2012.
- ESPN used this song in an ad advertising a Knicks vs. Mavericks Wednesday night game, using Dirk Nowitzki as backdrop.
- In Season 24, Episode 1 of the British television series Top Gear, co-host Matt LeBlanc buys an old Mercedes and finds a cassette tape of "Looking for Freedom" in the tape deck.
- American professional wrestler Timothy Thatcher occasionally uses the song as his entrance music at events in Germany.
- The song has inspired philosophical work on the theory of freedom, particularly the question as to what makes for a free life.
