= Tony Marshall (singer) =

German Schlager and opera singer (1938–2023)

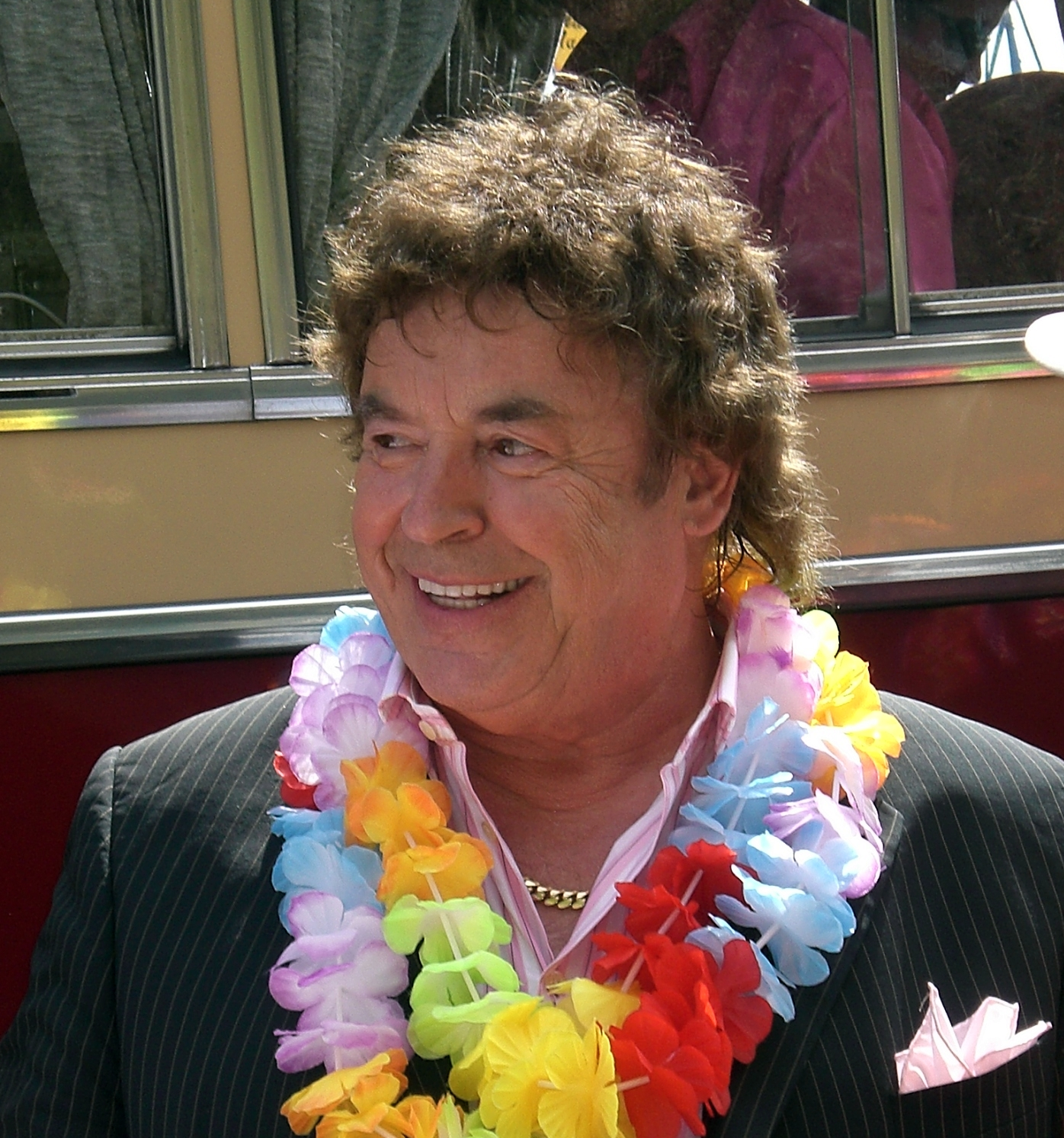
- Marshall in Hamburg in 2009
- Born: 3 February 1938; Baden-Baden, Gau Baden, Germany
- Died: 16 February 2023 (aged 85); Baden-Baden, Baden-Württemberg, Germany
- Occupation: Singer
- Years active: 1971–2019

Herbert Anton Hilger (born Bloeth; 3 February 1938 – 16 February 2023), known professionally as Tony Marshall, was a German schlager and opera singer. Famous since 1971 with his hit song "Schöne Maid", he also played in some comedies and was often seen on television.

== Early life and education ==
Born in Baden-Baden, Marshall trained as an opera singer in Karlsruhe, graduating in 1965.

== Career ==
Rather than embarking on a career in opera, in 1971, Marshall had his first hit single with "Schöne Maid". A year later, an English-language version was also released, titled "Pretty Maid". "Pretty Maid" peaked at number 16 in Australia in 1971. In 1976, he won Ein Lied für Den Haag with the song "Der Star" but in less than 24 hours, he was disqualified because his song was previously sung in public in 1973 by Nizza Thobi causing his spot in Eurovision to be taken over by the Les Humphries Singers.

In February 2009, he was appointed an Officer of the Order of Tahiti Nui.

== Death ==
Marshall died in Baden-Baden on 16 February 2023, at the age of 85.
