= Jack White (music producer) =

German music producer and composer, soccer player (1940–2025)

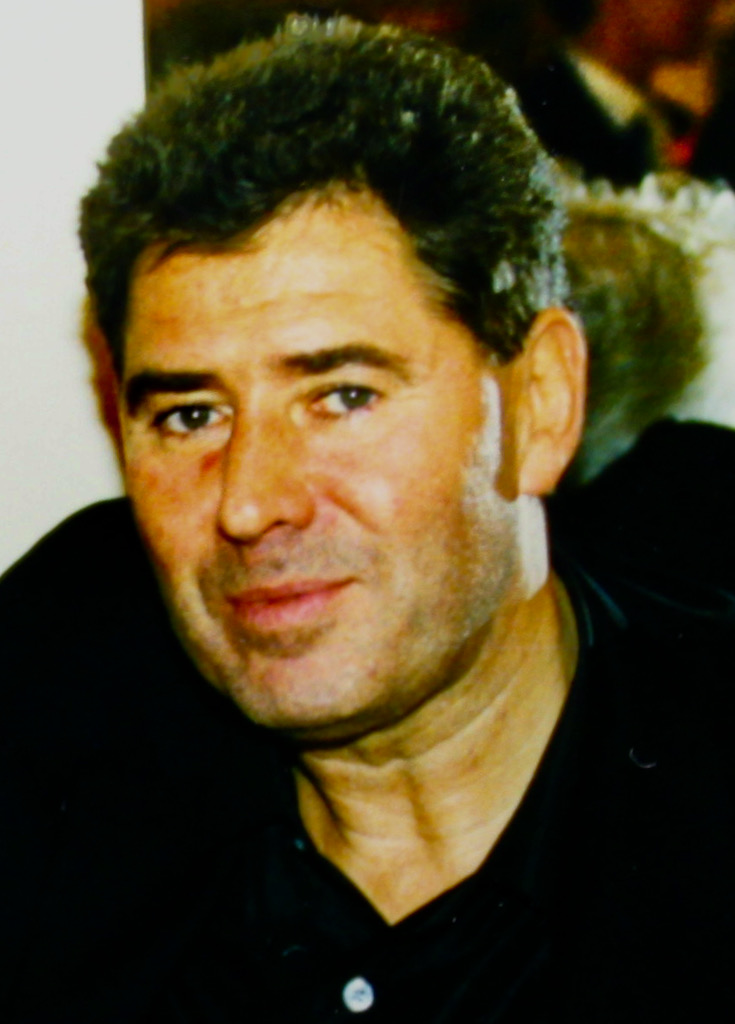

Background information
- Born: Horst Nußbaum; 2 September 1940; Cologne, Gau Cologne-Aachen, Germany
- Died: c. 16 October 2025 (aged 85) Berlin, Germany
- Genres: Pop; German folk
- Occupations: Producer; singer
- Years active: 1964–2014
- Labels: White Records; JWP AG; Gloriella Music
Association football career
- Position: Midfielder
Senior career*
Years	Team	Apps	(Gls)
1961–1963	Viktoria Köln	17	(1)
1963–1964	FK Pirmasens	18	(1)
1964–1965	TSC Zweibrücken	11	(5)
1965–1966	PSV Eindhoven	2	(1)
1966–1976	Tennis Borussia Berlin		
- * Club domestic league appearances and goals

Horst Nußbaum (2 September 1940 – c. 16 October 2025), known professionally as Jack White, was a German composer, producer and footballer.

Born in Cologne, Nußbaum first played football professionally for six years during the 1960s. In music, he initially tried his hand as a singer with little success, but became one of the most successful producers of schlager music by the 1970s. As a singer, he had already used the stage name Jack White and kept it as a producer, as the name was easier for the international English-speaking stars and their managers he worked with.

In his music career, White created 25 of his own records, and is credited on 2512 other records, including 870 production credits. Some of the most notable international artists he worked with were Laura Branigan ("Gloria", "Self Control"), David Hasselhoff ("Looking for Freedom"), Paul Anka, Engelbert Humperdinck, Barry Manilow, and Jermaine Jackson ("When the Rain Begins to Fall"). On the German-language market, White worked with leading Schlager musicians such as Roland Kaiser, Roberto Blanco, Tony Marshall, Jürgen Marcus, Heino, Andrea Berg, Andrea Jürgens, and Hansi Hinterseer.

It is estimated that productions by or with him sold more than a billion musical units, making him one of the most successful German music producers. White won several European music awards for his own work and influence on the international music scene, including the German Golden Tuning Fork, and the RTL Group Lion. White, who had created several record labels throughout his career, retired in 2014.

== Football career ==
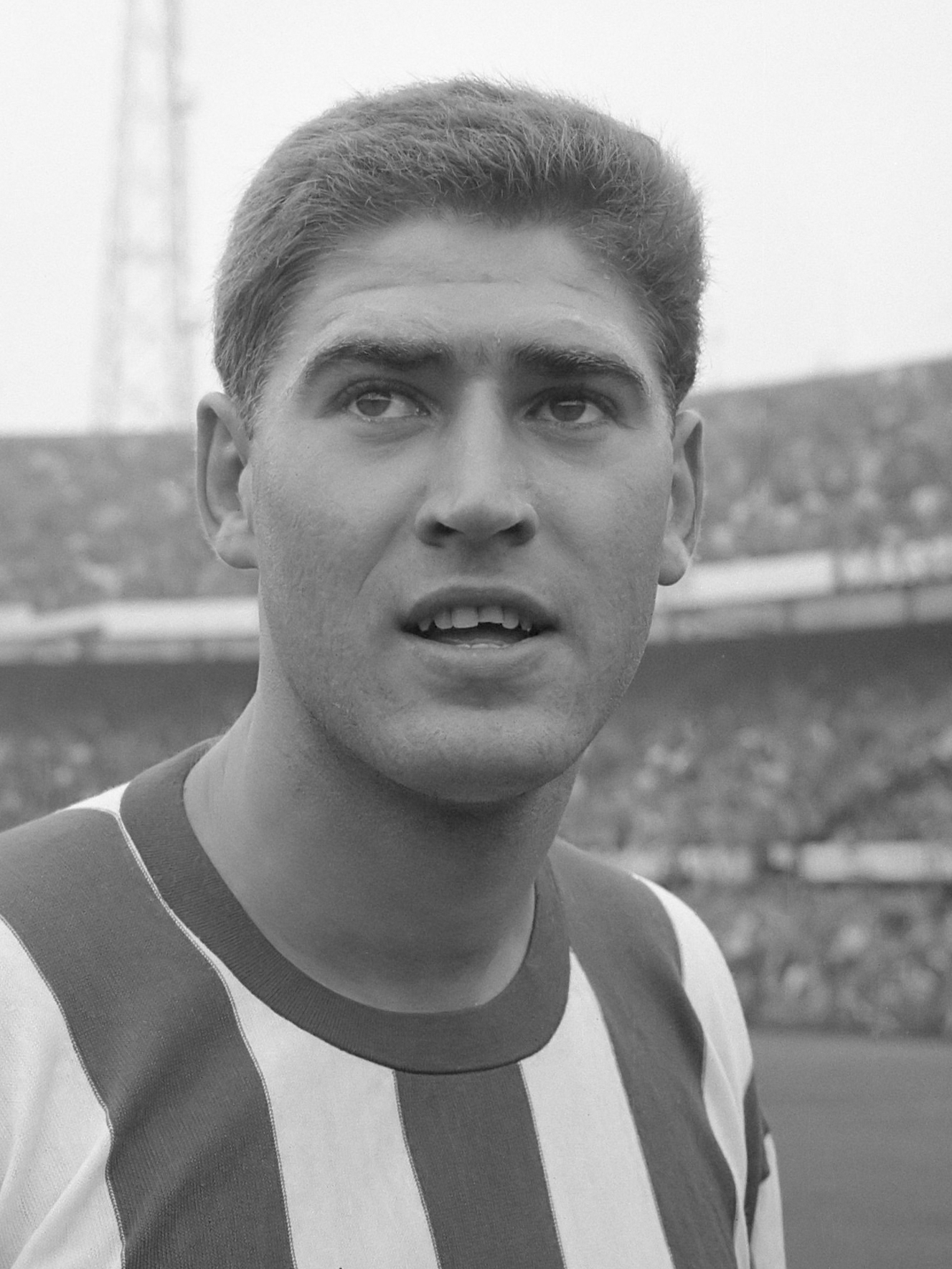
White, then Horst Nußbaum, playing for PSV Eindhoven in 1965

Before getting into music, White began playing professional football at the age of 20 for Viktoria Köln, and continued playing for six years (1961–1966), after which he played at an amateur level with Tennis Borussia Berlin for ten years while pursuing his music career. As athletes usually struggle with new careers post-retirement, he remained with the club for the opportunity to resume his professional contract. He represented five different clubs over his career, mainly playing in the right-midfielder or right-back positions.

White first joined Viktoria Köln when he was scouted by legendary coach Hennes Weisweiler in the 1961–62 season of the Oberliga West, staying for two seasons, where the team finished tenth in the 1961–62 season, and eighth in the 1962–63 season. Because of the Bundesliga's introduction the following year, the club was relegated to Regionalliga West. He then transferred to FK Pirmasens in the 1963–64 season of the Regionalliga Südwest, where he played the most games and scored the most goals for a single club, along with finishing second that season. After his transfer to TSC Zweibrücken, White also released his first single as a musician, and began to transition to music.

He finished his professional career at PSV Eindhoven, coming eighth in the 1965–66 season. He then continued an amateur career at Tennis Borussia Berlin for 10 years while furthering his music career. From 1992 to 1995, White served as their club president. As a music producer, White recorded the song "Fußball ist unser Leben" (Football is Our Life) with the Germany national team as singers for the 1974 FIFA World Cup, which West Germany hosted and also won.

During this time, White financially supported the club in an attempt to bring it back to the top flight of German Football. During his time there as a player, the club was separated from the Bundesliga due to being in Berlin, and not West Germany, and thus was not allowed to play at the same level it did before the World War II. He loaned a total of 5.8 million Marks throughout his presidency, and was eventually succeeded by Göttinger Gruppe, a now bankrupt investment group. The club has struggled since, and has mostly sat in either the fifth (or fourth) tier of German football, NOFV-Oberliga Nord.

== Music career ==
White began as a singer in his native Germany in the late 1960s, and found local success performing at bars. At the same time, White also began to produce and write music for other German musicians, and had his first hit, "Schöne Maid", sung by Tony Marshall, in 1971. As his popularity in Germany increased, he began to work with international artists, and produced for a wide range of artists, establishing himself as a producer. He decided to adopt a stage name after seeing the success that Roy Black (real name Gerhard Höllerich) enjoyed in the international market, and so he decided upon Jack White with the recommendation from his agent at the time. Among the songs he produced or co-produced for the international market were Laura Branigan's "Gloria" (1982), "Solitaire" (1983), "How Am I Supposed To Live Without You" (1983), "Self Control" (1984) and "The Lucky One" (1984), as well as Jermaine Jackson and Pia Zadora's "When the Rain Begins to Fall" (1984). He also worked with Paul Anka, Barry Manilow ("You're Looking Hot Tonight"), Engelbert Humperdinck and Audrey Landers. He wrote several hit songs with Mark Spiro, including Zadora's "Let's Dance Tonight" (1984) and Hazell Dean's "Who's Leaving Who" (1988). He also worked with Anne Murray, producing tracks on her 1986 album Something to Talk About and all tracks on her 1987 album Harmony. White also produced the soundtrack to the 1984 film Voyage of the Rock Aliens.

In the 1980s, White worked with David Hasselhoff. White's production work with Hasselhoff consisted of four albums, but the most popular song was "Looking for Freedom". The record experienced great success both in America, and in Germany, was used in protests against the Berlin Wall and the separation of East and West Germany. In 1989, Hasselhoff performed this song on top of the Brandenburg Gate in Berlin, and two years later, the Soviet Union collapsed and the Berlin Wall was destroyed. The song remains popular in German speaking nations, as its political impact created a lasting impact in its audience. The song has also been analysed in philosophical studies discussing the nature of freedom in the modern world.

In 1984, White founded his own record label, White Records, and published his work through the label, continuing to work with German and English speaking artists as a songwriter and producer. White was also director of Jack White Productions (JWP AG), which was established in 1998. In 2006, White was terminated from JWP AG, due to a "breach in trust", between White and chairman at the time, Thomas M. Stein. In June 2010, JWP AG became known as 7days entertainment AG, and then filed for bankruptcy in April 2014. The chairman of JWP AG, Thomas M. Stein claimed that a breach of trust was the reason behind the dismissal. In 2012, Munich based record label Telamo purchased White Records and now works with indie German musicians to produce and write new music.

In 2008, White re-entered the production market through a new label, Gloriella Music, where he continued to produce and write for artists. After his retirement in 2014, he sold distributing rights to Sony Music, although he remained involved with Gloriella, as an executive.

In January 2014, White announced on The Great Festival of the Best that he was going to perform a final time before retirement. Then in May, White made his last public performance as a musician, at a festival hosted by Florian Silbereisen called The Summer Festival by the Lake, where he played his own music, along with covers of his productions, and a final "Last Song". Since then, he has officially stopped performing, and has become less involved in the music scene. Throughout his career, White still made and performed his own music, and his international fame resulted in his own work becoming successful in German speaking nations. White is credited on 2513 records over his career and has created 25 of his own.

== Style of music ==
As a producer, White worked with many international pop artists, especially the subgenre of synth-pop that was very popular in the 1980s. The development of synthesisers and music production software influenced White's music, as the majority of early producers in the 1980s developed the foundations of electronic dance music.

== Personal life and death ==
After 17 years together, his wife Janine, a former journalist who owned a ten percent stake in White's stock company, separated from White in January 2010. They had two children, in addition to three children from his two previous marriages. On 18 December 2015, he married his fourth wife, the Russian-German Rafaella, 44 years his junior. At the age of 78, White became a father to their son Maximilian Noah in March 2019. At the age of 83, White became a father to their daughter Angelina Melody on 30 October 2023.

On 16 October 2025, White's lifeless body was discovered in his house in Berlin. He was 85. The police launched a death investigation and determined that White, who had recently been left by his wife, died by suicide.

== Awards ==
White's production work internationally has earned various Music Recording Certification awards for surpassing sales milestones in different countries, both in the German and English market. The European market has given the most awards to these works due to the smaller sales figures required to achieve the milestones compared to the North American market.

=== Production awards ===
- Branigan (Laura Branigan) – 2 Gold awards, 1 in America and 1 in Canada
- Branigan 2 (Laura Branigan) – 1 Gold award in America
- Self Control (Laura Branigan) – 2 Platinum (Canada and US), 2 Gold (Germany and Hong Kong), 1 Silver (United Kingdom)
- Crazy for You (David Hasselhoff) – 6 Platinum Awards (2 in Austria, 1 in Germany, 3 in Switzerland)
- David (David Hasselhoff) – 4 Platinum Awards (2 in Austria, 1 in Germany, 1 in Switzerland)
- Everybody Sunshine (David Hasselhoff) – 3 Gold (1 in Austria, 1 in Germany, and 1 in Switzerland)
- Looking for Freedom (David Hasselhoff) – 5 Platinum (1 in Austria and Germany, 3 in Switzerland)

=== Personal awards ===
The Golden Tuning Fork (Goldene Stimmgabel) was a German music award won by White in 1992 awarded for high record sales between October 1991 to June 1992, specifically for Everybody Sunshine. White was also awarded an honorary Lion by the RTL Group for his work in the European music industry as a producer.
