= Kung Fury (soundtrack) =

2015 soundtrack album

Kung Fury: Original Motion Picture Soundtrack

Soundtrack album by Various artists
- Released: July 8, 2015
- Genre: Synthwave, Movie score
- Label: Universal Music Sweden
- Producer: Mitch Murder; Lost Years; Betamaxx; Highway Superstar; Christoffer Ling

Kung Fury: Original Motion Picture Soundtrack is the soundtrack album for the 2015 Swedish short film Kung Fury, released by Universal Music Sweden on July 8, 2015. It was composed by Swedish synthwave musicians Mitch Murder and Lost Years, with additional music by Patrik Öberg, Christoffer Ling, Highway Superstar, and Betamaxx. It was released on vinyl record on July 8, 2015.

David Hasselhoff produced and starred in a music video of the song "True Survivor", which debuted on April 16, 2015. It features him interacting with the film's writer/director/star David Sandberg, interspersed with scenes from the film.

== Track listing ==
No.	Title	Writer(s)	Artist	Length
1.	"Kung Fury"	Mitch Murder	Mitch Murder	3:12
2.	"True Survivor"	Jörgen Elofsson & Mitch Murder	David Hasselhoff	3:42
3.	"West Side Lane"	Lost Years	Lost Years	3:51
4.	"Redlining 6th"	Betamaxx	Betamaxx	2:58
5.	"Face Puncher"	Mitch Murder	Mitch Murder	1:28
6.	"The Final Stretch"	Mitch Murder	Mitch Murder	5:09
7.	"Careful Shouting"	Highway Superstar & Ilia Skibinsky	Highway Superstar	3:31
8.	"Enter the Fury"	Mitch Murder	Mitch Murder	3:57
9.	"Power Move"	Mitch Murder	Mitch Murder	3:06
10.	"Phoenix Rising"	Lost Years	Lost Years	5:26
11.	"From the Future"	Mitch Murder	Mitch Murder	3:54
12.	"Barbarianna"	Christoffer Ling	Christoffer Ling	1:46
13.	"Nuclear"	Lost Years	Lost Years	5:20

== Kung Fury (Lost Tapes) ==
Kung Fury (Lost Tapes)

Soundtrack album by Mitch Murder
- Released: August 28, 2015
- Genre: Synthwave
- Label: Independent
- Producer: Mitch Murder

A separate soundtrack by Mitch Murder titled Kung Fury (Lost Tapes) was released independently on August 28, 2015. The album contains tracks that were not in the film's final cut or did not make it in the first soundtrack.

=== Track listing ===
No.	Title	Length
1.	"Moment of Clarity"	1:13
2.	"Playing for Keeps"	2:49
3.	"Revenge"	1:30
4.	"Communication Device"	1:06
5.	"Before the Storm"	1:49
6.	"Street Brawler"	1:27
7.	"Terminathor"	0:49
8.	"Face Puncher (Alt. Take)"	1:37
9.	"Arrival"	2:26
10.	"Action Tape"	1:30
