= Satellite Young (album) =

Studio album by Satellite Young
- Released: April 5, 2017
- Recorded: 2013–2016
- Genre: J-pop; synthwave; electronica
- Length: 46:26
- Language: Japanese
- Producer: Satellite Young

Satellite Young chronology
Dividual Heart (2015)	Satellite Young (2017)	Modern Romance (2017)

Singles from Satellite Young
- 1. "Jack Doushi" Released: January 30, 2014; 2. "Fake Memory" Released: May 20, 2014; 3. "Geeky Boyfriend" Released: December 16, 2014; 4. "Break! Break! Tic! Tac!" Released: December 16, 2014; 5. "Don't Graduate, Senpai!" Released: January 11, 2016; 6. "Sniper Rouge" Released: February 15, 2016

Satellite Young (サテライトヤング, Sateraito Yangu) is the debut studio album by Japanese band Satellite Young, released on April 5, 2017, through their Bandcamp account. It features the band's first six singles, including the Mitch Murder collaboration "Sniper Rouge". The album also includes the title tracks of their EP releases Dividual Heart and Sanfransokyo Girl.

== Track listing ==
All lyrics are written by Emi Kusano, except where indicated; all music is composed by Emi Kusano and BelleMaison Sekine, except where indicated; all music is arranged by BelleMaison Sekine, except where indicated.

No.	Title	Lyrics	Music	Arrangement	Length
1.	"The Theme of Satellite Young (Instrumental)" (Sateraito Yangu no Tēma (サテライトヤングのテーマ))		Sekine		1:04
2.	"Jack Doushi" (Jakku Dōshi (ジャック同士))				3:35
3.	"Fake Memory" (Feiku Memorī (フェイクメモリー))				3:57
4.	"Sniper Rouge" (feat. Mitch Murder)		Kusano; Mitch Murder	Mitch Murder	3:59
5.	"Break! Break! Tic! Tac!"				4:27
6.	"Geeky Boyfriend"				3:30
7.	"AI Threnody"				4:08
8.	"Sanfransokyo Girl"	Yuka Oishi			4:20
9.	"Nonai Muchoo [Satellite Young Version]" (feat. Brinq)		Kusano; Yu Fujishima	Fujishima; Sekine	3:45
10.	"Don't Graduate, Senpai!" (Sotsugyō Shinai de, Senpai (卒業しないで、先輩))				3:48
11.	"Dividual Heart"	Sekine			4:52
12.	"Melancholy 2016"				4:55
Total length:					46:26

== Personnel ==
- Emi Kusano – lead vocals, lyrics, music
- BelleMaison Sekine – music, arrangement
- Tele Hideo – stage production
