= David Sandberg =

David Sandberg may refer to:

- David F. Sandberg (born 1981), Swedish filmmaker
- David Sandberg (born 1985), Swedish filmmaker and actor known for Kung Fury
