= GreenScreen Animals =

Digital media company

- Type: Private
- Industry: Visual effects CGI animation
- Founded: 2008
- Headquarters: Santa Monica, California, United States
- Website: www.greenscreenanimals.com

GreenScreen Animals is a digital media company. The company is best known for the producing of high definition green screen animal content and licensing stock footage.

== History ==
It was founded in 2008 and is based in Santa Monica, California.

GreenScreen Animals content is monitored by the American Humane Association's "No animals were harmed" unit.

The company has produced content for the 20th Century Fox films, We Bought A Zoo, Gone Girl, Goodbye Christopher Robin, The Art of Racing in the Rain, and the Paramount films Zoolander 2 and xXx: The Return of Xander Cage, as well as the viral sensation Kung Fury. GreenScreen Animals' footage has been used on a number of television programs, including Silicon Valley, American Gods, The Tonight Show, Speechless, Blackish, Vikings, Castle Rock, Fleabag and Jimmy Kimmel Live!. The stock footage distributor also featured content in the music videos, "Roar" by Katy Perry and "Ni**as in Paris" by Kanye West and Jay-Z, as well as many domestic and international commercials such as the Ladbrokes' FIFA World Cup spot titled "Brian and the Bear". GreenScreen Animals teamed up with the UK television production company MTP and the UK ad agency Cravens, alongside famous UK actor Brian Blessed, to deliver the spot.

In addition to production companies and ad agencies, the company has supported various non-profit organizations. It has supported Greenpeace to produce content for the "Click Clean" initiative and partnered with WildAid to supply content for a campaign designed to reduce the illegal wildlife trade of endangered species. GreenScreen Animals also partnered with the award-winning ad agency 72andSunny to provide humane animal content for an awareness campaign called "Tested on Humans”, which questions the long-term health effects of addictive e-cigarettes on youth. The campaign was backed by the non-profit organization Truth Initiative.

GreenScreen Animals has been featured in many publications and shows, including 3D World Magazine, the CBS series Innovation Nation with Mo Rocca and in Voyage LA.
