= Andreas Cahling =

Professional bodybuilder

- Professional bodybuilder

Personal info
- Born: 1952 (age 73–74); Sweden

Best statistics

Andreas Cahling (born 1952) is a professional bodybuilder. He won the IFBB Mr. International title in 1980. He also appeared as Thor in the movie Kung Fury.

In the 1980s, Cahling was an lacto-ovo vegetarian.
