= Satellite Young =

Japanese synthwave band

Satellite Young サテライトヤング
- Origin: Tokyo, Japan
- Genres: J-pop; synthwave; Electronica
- Years active: 2013–present
- Members: Emi Kusano; BelleMaison Sekine; Tele Hideo
- Website: satelliteyoung.bandcamp.com

Satellite Young (サテライトヤング, Sateraito Yangu) is a Japanese synthwave band founded by Emi Kusano and BelleMaison Sekine in 2013. Their music and style are influenced by classic J-pop artists such as Pink Lady, Minako Honda, Chisato Moritaka, Yoko Minamino, Yū Hayami, and Seiko Matsuda, as well as synthwave and new-age artists such as Jan Hammer, Cusco, and Tangerine Dream.

== History ==
In 2012, Emi Kusano was watching reruns of the 1980s Japanese comedy series Magical Chinese Girl Paipai!, which inspired her to write songs and create a musical project. A mutual friend at her university introduced her to BelleMaison Sekine. One year later, Kusano sent Sekine an a cappella demo of her song "Jack Doushi", which eventually became Satellite Young's debut single in 2014. Tele Hideo joined the duo in 2015 as a "media technologist", handling the production of the band's music videos and sometimes appearing on stage as a dancer or drummer. Now a trio, Satellite Young released their first EP and music video "Dividual Heart".

In 2016, the band recorded "Don't Graduate Senpai" for the Swedish retro anime Senpai Club. In addition, they collaborated with Mitch Murder to record the single "Sniper Rouge".

In 2017, Satellite Young released their self-titled debut album and their second EP Modern Romance. In addition, the band performed at the 2017 South by Southwest Music Festival.

On October 14, 2020, Kusano released her solo single "Glass Ceiling" under the pseudonym "Emi Satellite". Produced by London-based musician Skytopia and inspired by the 2019 South Korean film Kim Ji-young: Born 1982, the song focuses on the hardships and inequalities of women in East Asia.

== Members ==
- Emi Kusano (草野 絵美, Kusano Emi) – lead vocals, lyrics, music (2013–present)
- BelleMaison Sekine (ベルメゾン関根, Berumezon Sekine) – music, arrangement (2013–present)
- Tele Hideo (テレ・ヒデオ, Tere Hideo) – stage production (2015–present)

== Discography ==
=== Singles ===
- "Jack Doushi" (ジャック同士, Jakku Dōshi) (January 30, 2014)
- "Fake Memory" (フェイクメモリー, Feiku Memorī) (May 20, 2014)
- "Geeky Boyfriend" (December 16, 2014)
- "Break! Break! Tic! Tac!" (December 16, 2014)
- "Don't Graduate Senpai" (卒業しないで、先輩, Sotsugyō Shinai de, Senpai) (January 11, 2016)
- "Sniper Rouge" (Mitch Murder & Satellite Young) (February 15, 2016)
- "1000% Not a Dream!" (1000%ユメジャナイ！, Sen Pāsento Yume ja Nai!) (March 16, 2018)
- "Singing Dream" (April 20, 2018)
- "Moment in Slow Motion" (November 2, 2018)
- "Take On Me" (December 5, 2018)
- "New World Banzai" (新世界Banzai, Shin Sekai Banzai) (June 13, 2019)

=== Albums ===
- Satellite Young (April 5, 2017)

=== Mini albums ===
- Dividual Heart (October 16, 2015)
- Modern Romance (November 20, 2017)
- Sanfransokyo Girl (February 19, 2018)
