= Commando Ninja =

2018 French film by Benjamin Combes

- Theatrical release poster
- Directed by: Benjamin Combes
- Written by: Benjamin Combes
- Produced by: Benjamin Combes; James Secker; Tristan de Carbon
- Starring: Eric Carlesi; Philippe Allier; Stéphane Asensio; Anaëlle Rincent; Charlotte Poncin; Thyra Hann Phonephet; Cécile Fargues; Thémann Fagour; Olivier Dobremel
- Cinematography: Benjamin Combes
- Edited by: Benjamin Combes
- Music by: Thomas Cappeau
- Production company: B.C. Pictures
- Release date: 21 December 2018 (YouTube)
- Running time: 68 minutes
- Country: France
- Language: English
- Budget: €31,953

Commando Ninja is a 2018 English-language French martial arts action comedy film written and directed by Benjamin Combes. It pays homage to 1980s action films such as Commando, The Terminator, Rambo: First Blood Part II, Predator, and American Ninja. The film stars Eric Carlesi, Philippe Allier, Stéphane Asensio, Olivier Dobremel, Anaëlle Rincent, and Charlotte Poncin.

The film was crowdfunded through Kickstarter in 2018. It raised €31,953, which was more than double its original goal of €15,000. Originally planned to run at 45 minutes, Combes expanded the running time to 68 minutes and released the film on YouTube on 21 December 2018.

== Plot ==
In 1968, during the Vietnam War, a Green Beret platoon known as the "Lizard Smokers", led by John Hunter, is ambushed by ninjas. In the midst of the chaos, Leeroy Hopkins loses his right arm in the ambush, Sgt. Oskar Kowalsky is attacked by velociraptors, and John is captured by the Viet Cong. While in captivity, John learns the art of ninjutsu from his captor, Colonel Yin. After John's training is completed, Yin sets him free, but warns him of a red ninja who betrayed his teachings. Yin is killed when his compound is bombed by the U.S.

In 1986 Canada, John is paid a visit by Hopkins and is informed that his ex-wife Lori has been murdered and his daughter Jenny has been kidnapped by ninjas working for an illegal arms dealer. John and Hopkins participate in a joint operation between the FBI and the U.S. Air Force in Los Angeles to nab the dealer, but the operation goes awry when John recognizes the dealer as former Soviet Army Colonel Kinsky, who was involved in his former platoon's ambush. Hopkins is killed by the red ninja before Kinsky escapes.

John travels to the Central American country of Val Verde and storms through Kinsky's villa to rescue his daughter, but discovers that Kowalsky has been converted into a cyborg. Jenny kills Kinsky by secretly placing a grenade in his pants, but Kowalsky suddenly disappears with her. John battles and defeats the red ninja in a duel, only to discover Lori behind the mask. Lori explains that an alternate future version of herself was the one murdered by the ninjas, and that Kinsky had supplied the ninjas with time travel technology since the Vietnam war. She then tells him that Jenny has been sent to 1998, where Kinsky is training his army to establish a new world order. After Lori urges John to save Jenny, he decapitates her and uses the last of her energy to travel to a post-apocalyptic wasteland in 1998.

Upon his arrival, John reunites with Jenny, who is now an adult. She reveals that she reprogrammed Kowalsky to fight on their side. John also discovers that Hopkins is alive and well, driving a Pontiac Firebird Trans Am time machine.

In a mid-credits sequence, the quartet attempt to travel back to 1986, but end up trapped in a video game programmed by Kinsky. They must find a way to escape from the video game world and stop Kinsky from conquering the world with his army.

== Cast ==
- Eric Carlesi as John Hunter, an American Green Beret that is 50% commando and 50% ninja
- Philippe Allier as Leeroy Hopkins, a racist and anti-semite Air Force Colonel from Texas who has a cybernetic right arm after losing his original one to ninjas in the Vietnam War
- Stéphane Asensio as Oskar Kowalsky, a Polish-American member of John's former platoon who is converted into a cyborg
- Anaëlle Rincent as Jenny Hunter, John's daughter

- Charlotte Poncin as adult Jenny Hunter

- Thyra Hann Phonephet as Yin Sensei, a Viet Cong Colonel and ninjutsu practitioner who becomes John's mentor.
- Cécile Fargues as Lori Hunter, John's ex-wife
- Thémann Fagour as Curtis Jackson (a.k.a. Snow White), a black member of John's former platoon who is revealed to have died during Kinsky's experimentations.
- Olivier Dobremel as Oleg Kinsky, a Jewish former Soviet Army Colonel and an illegal arms dealer who kidnaps Jenny.

== Production ==
In 2016 Benjamin Combes wrote the script for Commando Ninja and spent US$5,000 on producing and shooting footage with his friends. Combes was heavily inspired by his two favorite childhood films: Commando and American Ninja, as well as the 2011 film Drive and the 2013 video game Far Cry 3: Blood Dragon.

=== Casting ===
After doing a small casting call on a local Facebook group, Combes discovered bodybuilder Eric Carlesi and film memorabilia collector Philippe Allier and cast them as John Hunter and Leeroy Hopkins, respectively. In addition, he cast his former film schoolteacher Olivier Dobremel and Stéphane Asensio, Combes brought in his niece Anaëlle Rincent for the role of John's daughter Jenny. Martial arts instructor Thyra Hann Phonephet was cast as Yin Sensei after Combes saw some of his works in indie films.

=== Filming ===
Commando Ninja was shot in Montpellier, France from 2016 to 2018. In contrast to Kung Fury, which relied on using a digital sound stage, the film used real sets and practical special effects. The stunts were choreographed by Antony Cinturino. The kidnapping scene was shot at Combes' aunt's house, as it had similar architecture to American houses and the attic had 1980s carpeting. A swamp and a river outside Montpellier were used as stand-ins for the Vietnam War scenes. Combes' family wine distillery was used to portray the Los Angeles warehouse scene. The post-apocalyptic wasteland scene was shot at a bauxite quarry south of Montpellier.

The Val Verde assault scene was shot at Asensio's stepfather's winemaking villa in southern France. Filming the scene took three years, as the crew could only shoot during the summer and the vegetation in the background changed constantly. Because of this, Combes had to digitally alter the backgrounds shot during the fall to match those shot in the summer. Carlesi's hair length changed considerably during filming, but Combes kept that inconsistency in the film as a tribute to Samurai Cop, where Matt Hannon was forced to wear a wig for reshoots.

=== Post-production ===
For the international version, all of the characters were dubbed over by English-speaking voice actors through the website VoiceBunny.com, except Charlotte Poncin and Thyra Hann Phonephet, who speak fluent English. Asensio also recorded his English lines during the pizza delivery scene.

In the French version, the supporting cast re-recorded their lines during post-production, but the lines of John, Hopkins, and Kinsky were dubbed over by French YouTubers Ganesh 2 and Superflame, who gave John an Arnold Schwarzenegger voice, Hopkins a Bruce Willis voice, and Kinsky a Christopher Lloyd voice.

=== Marketing ===
In February 2019, German independent toymaker Goodleg released a limited run of action figures of the film's main characters, with pre-sale having started the day of the film's release. The action figures were kitbashed from various 1980s toy lines such as G.I. Joe, Masters of the Universe, and WWF.

== Release ==
The film made its debut on YouTube in English, French, and Polish on 21 December 2018. It was released in Czech on 31 December 2018.

Fans who backed the project received copies of the film on VHS or Blu-ray.

== Soundtrack ==
Commando Ninja (Original Motion Picture Soundtrack)

Soundtrack album by Thomas Cappeau
- Released: 14 December 2018
- Genre: Synthwave
- Label: Lakeshore Records
- Producer: Thomas Cappeau

The film's soundtrack score was composed by Thomas Cappeau and features songs by synthwave musicians Cobra Copter, Flash Arnold, and OGRE. The title theme song is by German synthwave artist Volt Age. The official soundtrack was released digitally on Bandcamp and in vinyl form by Enjoy the Ride Records on 14 December 2018.

While conceptualizing Commando Ninja, Combes researched several synthwave artists on SoundCloud before discovering OGRE's 2014 album 195, which contains tracks that perfectly fit Combes' vision for the film. The soundtrack was also influenced by that of the 2015 short film Kung Fury.

In composing the score, Cappeau drew inspiration from Jerry Goldsmith and Paul Hertzog, who extensively used synthesizers on Rambo: First Blood Part II and Bloodsport, respectively. To give the score an authentic '80s feel without sounding like a modern tribute, Cappeau used old, discontinued synthesizers from that era.

=== Track listing ===
All tracks are written by Thomas Cappeau, except where indicated.

No.	Title	Writer(s)	Artist	Length
1.	"The 'Nam"			1:24
2.	"The Raid on the House"			3:29
3.	"The Deal"			3:20
4.	"Confronting the Red Ninja"			2:43
5.	"Kinski"			1:08
6.	"The Pool"			1:18
7.	"Way of the Commando Ninja"			3:37
8.	"Master and Apprentice"			2:45
9.	"John Versus the Red Ninja"			7:03
10.	"The Feeling"			1:18
11.	"Like a Family Again"			1:23
12.	"In a Wasteland"			2:27
13.	"Jenny 1998"			1:08
14.	"Commando Ninja"	Michael Wagner; Jonathan Schmid; Oliver Wimmer; Jona Raischl	Volt Age feat. Maram El Dsoki	3:53

== Related works ==
Commando Ninja: Back in 'Nam is a comic book prequel that takes place 12 years before the film. The comic book is written by Gerardo Preciado and drawn by Luis Rivera, and was released in digital format in mid-2019.

A novelized version of the original screenplay, using the same title, was written by Brian G. Berry.

Hopkins is a prequel short film with Allier reprising his role as the titular character. Released on YouTube on 13 November 2020, the short film is set in 1978 New York City, where Hopkins becomes a vigilante following a string of homeless veteran murders.

== Sequel ==
Commando Ninja II: Invasion America was released on Blu-ray by ETR Media on 28 October 2025.

== See also ==
- Kung Fury
- Turbo Kid
