= Turbo Kid =

2015 film by François Simard

- Theatrical release poster
- Directed by: François Simard; Anouk Whissell; Yoann-Karl Whissell
- Written by: François Simard; Anouk Whissell; Yoann-Karl Whissell
- Produced by: Benoit Beaulieu; Anne-Marie Gélinas; Tim Riley; Ant Timpson
- Starring: Munro Chambers; Laurence Leboeuf; Edwin Wright; Aaron Jeffery; Romano Orzari; Michael Ironside
- Cinematography: Jean-Philippe Bernier
- Edited by: Luke Haigh
- Music by: Jean-Philippe Bernier; Jean-Nicolas Leupi
- Production companies: EMA Films; Timpson Films
- Distributed by: Epic Pictures Group
- Release dates: January 26, 2015 (Sundance); August 28, 2015 (United States)
- Running time: 95 minutes
- Countries: Canada; New Zealand
- Language: English
- Box office: $67,069

Turbo Kid is a 2015 post-apocalyptic superhero film written and directed by François Simard, Anouk Whissell, and Yoann-Karl Whissell. The film stars Munro Chambers, Laurence Leboeuf, Michael Ironside, Edwin Wright, Aaron Jeffery, and Romano Orzari. The film follows the adventures of a teenage comic book fan turned superhero in an alternate 1997 post-apocalyptic Earth where water is scarce. He teams up with a mysterious girl and an arm-wrestling cowboy to stop a tyrannical warlord. Epic Pictures Group released the film in the United States on August 28.

== Plot ==
In a post-apocalyptic version of 1997, a society lives in a land nicknamed "The Wasteland" that is littered with trash and ruled by a sadistic and tyrannical overlord named Zeus, who uses a device to grind captives into water. The Kid, a teenage comic book fan, scavenges the wastes on his BMX bike to trade with junk dealer Bagu. After trading for water and his favorite comic book Turbo Rider, The Kid runs into Apple, a mysterious, free-spirited young woman. Frightened by her quirky personality and aggressive attempts to befriend him, he flees to his bunker, only to find she has followed him. When she hands him the comic book that he dropped, he reluctantly allows her to stay with him.

As The Kid teaches Apple his rules on how to survive in the Wasteland, they grow closer, and The Kid develops a crush on her. When one of Zeus' henchmen kidnaps Apple, she urges him to flee. He narrowly avoids capture when he accidentally discovers the remains of the real Turbo Rider. After taking Turbo Rider's armor and wrist weapon, he sets off to rescue Apple. At the same time, Frederick, a champion arm-wrestling cowboy, is captured while attempting to rescue his brother. After cutting off Frederick's right hand, Zeus throws him into an arena with Apple. The Kid arrives to intervene, but his wrist weapon fails to fire due to a low charge. He is then captured and thrown into the arena, where he, Frederick, and Apple defeat Zeus' warriors and escape.

The Kid discovers that Apple is a robot after seeing her survive a gunshot during their escape. She tells him that she is a friendship model. Because of damage to her circuitry, they contact Bagu, who directs them to the robot graveyard, where they can find spare parts. When Bagu is captured and tortured to death, he reveals their location to Zeus, who sends his henchmen. The Kid and Apple evade capture during the chase, but Apple is decapitated by Skeletron, Zeus' lead henchman. The Kid attaches Apple's head to a new robot body and falls unconscious to the graveyard's toxic fumes. He later wakes to find that Frederick, who now has a robotic hand, has rescued him; Frederick says Apple could not be reactivated. They return to Zeus' camp to kill him.

The Kid reveals that Zeus killed his parents for their water when he was a child. Although Frederick and The Kid defeat many of Zeus' henchmen, The Kid is about to be killed when Apple shows up and rescues him. Upset at his men's incompetence, Zeus shoots The Kid, Apple, and Frederick. The Kid is saved by a tin case of View-Master discs he keeps under Turbo Rider's armor. Using the wrist weapon, he blasts Zeus and his remaining henchmen. However, Zeus rises and reveals himself also to be a robot, a corporate model designed to ruthlessly conquer all competition. The Kid blows him up by shooting explosives that Frederick brought along with them. Apple dies while protecting The Kid from the blast. The explosion reveals a fresh water source underneath the site.

After The Kid buries Apple, Frederick invites him to stay and help him deliver water to the people of the Wasteland. The Kid declines and rides off to explore the wastelands.

== Cast ==
- Munro Chambers as The Kid
  - Evan Manoukian portrays The Kid in a flashback
- Laurence Leboeuf as Apple
- Michael Ironside as Zeus
- Edwin Wright as Skeletron
- Aaron Jeffery as Frederick
- Romano Orzari as Bagu
- Orphée Ladouceur as Female Guard
- Steeve Léonard as Scout
- Yves Corbeil as Turbo Général
- Anouk Whissell as The Mother
- François Simard as The Father
- Yoann-Karl Whissell as The Bald Guard
- Tyler Hall as Bounty Hunter
- Martin Paquette as Giant Warrior
- Pierre Sigouin as Frederick's Brother

== Production ==
The film originated as T Is for Turbo, a submission for the "T" segment in Ant Timpson's horror anthology The ABCs of Death. Though it was not selected, Timpson was impressed and approached the filmmakers to expand their idea into a feature.

== Release ==
The film premiered at the Sundance Film Festival on January 26, 2015. Epic Pictures Group released it on August 28, 2015.

== Reception ==
On Rotten Tomatoes, the film has an approval rating of 91% based on 55 reviews and a rating of 7.1/10. The site's consensus reads: "A nostalgic ode to kids' movies of yesteryear, Turbo Kid eyes the past through an entertaining – albeit surprisingly gory – postmodern lens." On Metacritic, which assigns a normalized rating, the film has a score of 60 out of 100 based on 6 critics, indicating "mixed or average reviews".

Simon Abrams of RogerEbert.com awarded it two out of four stars, saying: "Turbo Kid may be aimed at adults, but its infantilizing vintage fetish makes an otherwise cute action-adventure a bad blast to the past." Consequence of Sound awarded it a B+, saying, "Turbo Kid captures the wildly discordant dreams of any budding movie lover when they were 10, creating one of the funniest works of sandbox cinema made to date. Turbo Kid is here to play, and he's loads of fun." We Got This Covered awarded it four out of five stars, saying, "Turbo Kid is a magical can't-miss experience that's like a Saturday morning cartoon turned into an apocalyptic 80s fever-dream. A stunning visual masterpiece that redefines the phrase 'low-budget filmmaking'." Dread Central awarded it five out of five stars, saying, "Funny, gory, hugely enjoyable and – most importantly – shining with spirit, Turbo Kid is a wild success. Everyone involved should be thoroughly proud of themselves." Bloody Disgusting said, "The Final Word: There's no two ways around it, Turbo Kid is an absolute blast and deserves all the love and praise that it's been given! I loved every second of it and it's one of those movies that I want to watch over and over."

=== Box office ===
Turbo Kid played in 31 cinemas across the United States and grossed $67,069.

== Sequel ==
On September 28, 2016, a sequel to the film was officially announced. One day before the announcement, Le Matos released the official music video for their track "No Tomorrow", which serves as a prequel to the original film.

== Video game ==
A video game serving as a sequel to and inspired by the original film, simply titled Turbo Kid, was developed by game studio Outerminds and launched on April 9, 2024.

== See also ==
- A Boy and His Dog
- Commando Ninja
- Kung Fury
