= Emi Kusano =

Japanese artist (born 1990)

- 草野絵美
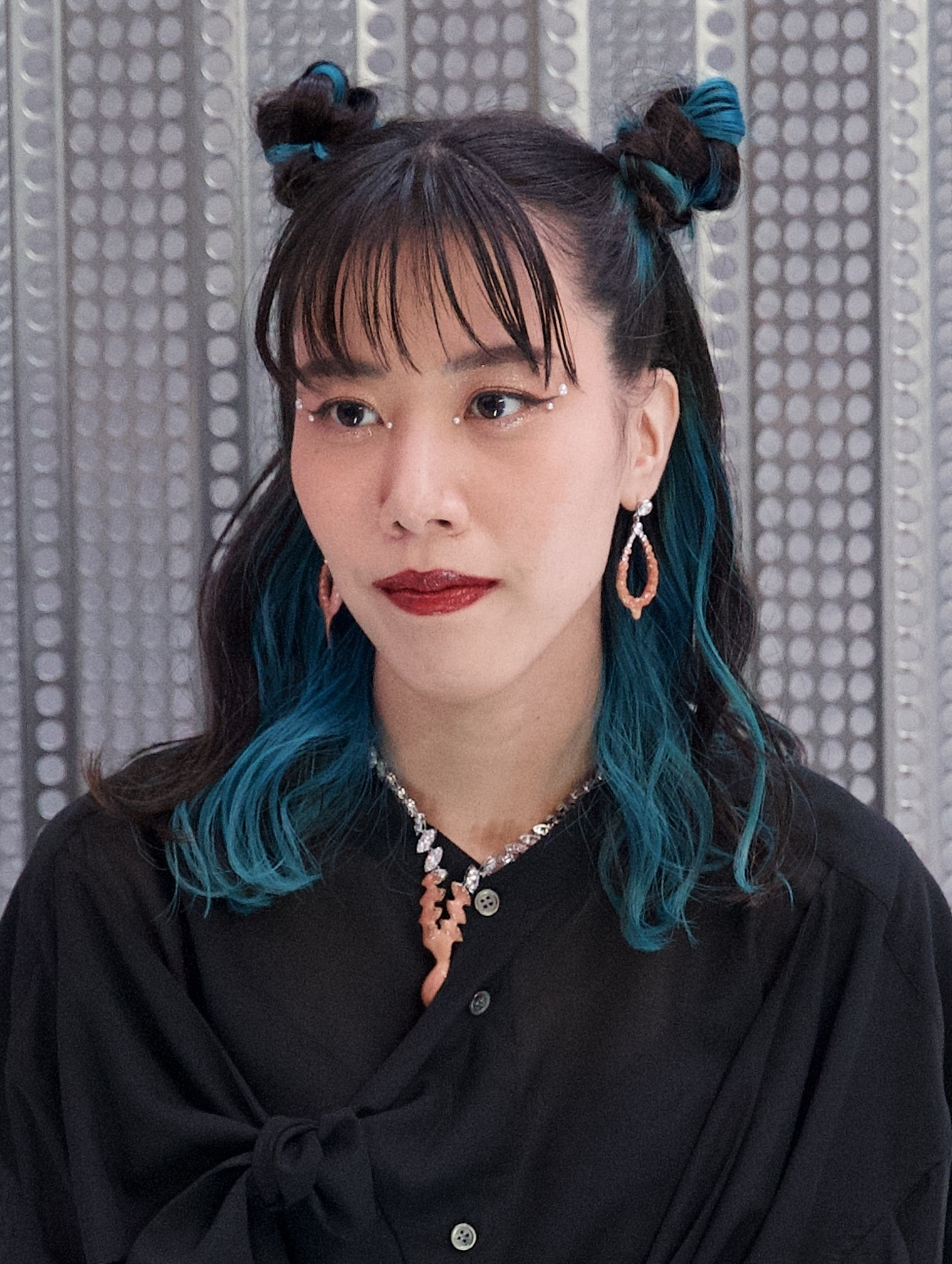
- Born: August 4, 1990 (age 36); Tokyo, Japan
- Other name: Emi Satellite
- Education: Keio University
- Occupation: Artist
- Known for: Digital art; AI art
- Children: Zombie Zoo Keeper
- Awards: Finalist, Lumen Prize (Still Image), 2024 Winner, Meta Morph Award (AI Video) Excellence Award, Currents Art Media, 2024; Selected as a Young Global Leader by the World Economic Forum, 2025
- Website: Official website

Emi Kusano (Japanese: 草野 絵美, Hepburn: Kusano Emi; born August 4, 1990) is a Tokyobased Japanese multidisciplinary artist known for creating photography, video, and installations using generative AI technology. Her work explores themes of nostalgia, pop culture, and collective memory.

Her work explores themes of nostalgia, pop culture, and collective memory. She is recognized as one of the early practitioners of generative AI art.

Her work has been exhibited at the 21st Century Museum of Contemporary Art, Kanazawa, and screened at the M+ Museum’s Asian Avant-Garde Film Festival. Additionally, she has participated in prestigious international art fairs, including Paris Photo and Art Basel Hong Kong.

In 2025, she was named one of the World Economic Forum's Young Global Leaders. In 2026, she was selected as a fellow for the AI x Arts Fellowship at Mohamed bin Zayed University of Artificial Intelligence.

Kusano serves as a part-time lecturer at the Tokyo University of the Arts and is the producer and vocalist for the Synthwave music unit, Satellite Young.

== Early life ==
=== Photography ===
Kusano was born and raised in Tokyo. Kusano's career began during her high school years before 2008 when she became involved in street fashion photography. Her photographs, primarily taken in Harajuku, were published on "Japanese Streets", "Metropolis", CNN's travel guide magazine "CNN GO","WGSN". Her photography was exhibited at the FIT Museum in New York and the Victoria and Albert Museum in London.

== Career ==
=== Music and Installation work ===
Since 2014, in collaboration with BelleMaison Sekine, Kusano has led "Satellite Young," a synthwave music unit s the lead vocalist, she sings about blending 1980s idol culture with lyrics that tackle contemporary issues such as planned obsolescence ("Sony Timer"), online dating, artificial intelligence, and social media. Their music, known for its conceptual depth, has earned international niche recognition. "Satellite Young" has participated in music festivals, including "South by Southwest," showcasing their unique fusion of retro aesthetics and modern critiques.

In 2018, she was selected to participate in "Art Hack Day," an interdisciplinary art hackathon held at The National Museum of Emerging Science and Innovation. where she presented "Singing Dream," a karaoke machine endowed with artificial life, earning the Jury Prize.

"Instababy Generator," a 2019 installation co-created with Junichi Yamaoka, explored the concept of designer babies and received recognition at the SIGGRAPH Art Gallery.

In October 2020, operating under the name Emi Satellite, she debuted as a solo singer with her first single "Glass Ceiling," an empowerment anthem that addresses the challenges faced by women and encourages progress towards the future. The music video for this song features a direction where strong women rewrite the roles of protagonists in a Bishōjo game, a type of dating simulation game. This concept later served as a prototype for Shinsei Galverse.

=== Challenge for Blockchain Art ===
In 2021, she explored the financial world through her single "IPO" and entered the NFT space with "Love Is an IPO," her first NFT work on Ethereum, sold on Foundation.

In April 2022, she co-founded the crowdfunded anime project "Shinsei Galverse" with Ayaka Ohira, Devin Mancuso, and Jack Baldwin. serving as one of the executive directors overseeing the creative direction and story.

The project's NFT collection of 8,888 ranked #1 on OpenSea's "Top NFTs" for several days, marking one of Japan's first globally successful blockchain art projects. In 2023, Shinsei Galverse produced the official "I like u" music video by Grammy-nominated singer Tove Lo as an initial anime endeavor.

Kusano also contributed to discussions on Web3.0 and blockchain technology as a panelist in seminars organized by the Digital Agency of Japan.

=== AI art ===
In May 2023, Kusano's first AI art collection "Neural Fad" depicting imaginary fashion history sold out 100 pieces within 24 hours at the "Bright Moments Tokyo"

In June, she created WWDJAPAN's first AI-generated magazine cover using her own face. It is the first AI cover in Japanese fashion media.

She was also appointed t to the Cultural Affairs Agency's Copyright Subcommittee, she participates in discussions on generative AI and copyright.

Her "Synthetic Reflections" self-portrait series debuted on SuperRare, with the first piece auctioned for 3.5 ETH (equivalent to 6,480 US dollars at the time).

In July 2023, she co-exhibited a 3D AI-generated dress at Christie's "Future Frequencies" auction with Gucci, alongside Claire Silver.

In September, her 30-piece "Pixelated Perception" exhibit at Art Blocks Marfa explored 1990s media and gender, also showcased at the 21st Century Museum of Contemporary Art, Kanazawa.

In December, her "Techno-Animism" AI art collection fused Japanese animism with technology. Collaborating with a U.S. gallery, she unveiled 336 pieces during a two-week Art Basel world tour. Throughout the two-week tour, she sold a total of 336 pieces, generating 11.2 ETH (equivalent to 21,264 US dollars at the time).

=== Generative art ===
In February 2024, the generative art platform Art Blocks selected the work "Melancholic Magical Maiden," for its Curated category. This piece reconstructs the aesthetics of 1990s magical girl anime, offering a critique of past anime heroines. It sold out within an hour, with all 300 pieces going for a total of 57 ETH (equivalent to approximately 215,385US dollars at the time).

In April 2024, Emi Kusano spoke at the Standing Committee on Copyright and Other Rights at the World Intellectual Property Organization (WIPO) in Geneva, Switzerland, where she presented AI-specific information for discussion.

== Style and technique ==
Kusano draws inspiration from Japanese retro-futurism as a foundation for her artwork, which explores the cutting-edge of technology. This approach is fueled by nostalgia for the pre-internet era, specifically the postwar period when Japanese mass media held significant sway. By blending modern technology with retro-culture, she captures the complex feelings of love, hate, and ambivalence towards present and future accelerationism. While at university, Kusano was profoundly influenced by Naoki Sakai, the industrial designer responsible for igniting the retro-futurism movement. In her musical project "Satellite Young", Kusano dons the persona of an '80s female idol and sings about contemporary technology. In her installation piece "Singing Dream", she investigates the concept of an artificial life form inhabiting a karaoke machine, which has been popular since the 1980s, compelling people to sing. In the collaborative NFT art project "Shinsei Galverse", Kusano reimagines a cyberpunk anime primarily featuring female characters, incorporating elements of magical girls popular in the early Heisei period.

== Personal life ==
Kusano has two sons. In August 2021, she minted her older son Zombie Zoo Keeper's pixel art on "OpenSea" as part of his summer research project. The artwork was purchased by notable figures including Brud CEO Trevor McFedries and Steve Aoki, who bought the piece for the equivalent of 21.82 thousand US dollars, highlighting the intersection of art, technology, and family in her work.

== Bibliography ==
- "Neo Parenting, Developing Intellectual Curiosity with Parents and Children" (March 2022, CCC Media House, Japanese)
- "Let's touch the science in the future! Ouchi-Jikken-go" (March 2022, CCC Media House, Japanese)

== Award ==
- In July 2024, Kusano's AI video "Morphing Memory of Neural Fad" won the 2024 Meta Morph Award in the AI Video category, and her AI collection "Pixelated Perception" was awarded runner-up in the AI Photo category.
- In August of the same year, her AI collections "Cognitive Chaos" and "Neural Fad" were nominated as one of the 65 finalists for the Still Image Award by The Lumen Prize 2024.
- In March 2025, she received the Excellence Award at the Currents Art Award 2024, which recognizes emerging artists shaping new currents in contemporary art.
- In April 2025, she was selected as a 2025 Young Global Leaders by the World Economic Forum, in recognition of her pioneering practice in AI art, her influence on the digital art market, and her contributions to education.

== Selected Art exhibition ==
- "Japan Fashion Now" (April 2011, Fashion Institute of Technology, New York )
- "Four Alchemists Method" (January 2012, Seibu Department Store Art Space)
- "Shibukaru Festival" (October 2012, Parco Museum)
- "Art Hack Day" (March 2018, National Museum of Emerging Science and Innovation )
- "Kimono: Kyoto to Catwalk" (August–October 2020, Victoria and Albert Museum)
- "Hello my name is NFT" (September 2022, Laforet Museum)
- "Tokyo Digital Art Gallery" (October 2022, ARTFACTORY Jonan Island)
- "Bright Moments Tokyo" (May 2023, Shibuya Parco)
- "Non Fungible Conference" (June 2023, Carlos Lopes Pavilion)
- "Christie's 3.0 presents Future Frequencies: Explorations in Generative Art and Fashion in collaboration with Gucci" (July 2023, Rockefeller Center)
- "The Gateway Korea" (September 2023, SFACTORY)
- "E-Motions" (September 2023, UNIT London)
- "FEMGEN Art Blocks Marfa" (September 2023, Glitch Gallery)
- "DXP (Digital Transformation Planet): Towards the Next Interface" (October 2023, 21st Century Museum of Contemporary Art, Kanazawa)
- "All Star Collections vol1" (October 2023, Saatchi Gallery)
- "Gateway Art Basel Miami" (December 2023)
- "DXP (Digital Transformation Planet) - Toward the Next Interface" (October 2023, Kanazawa 21st Century Museum of Art)
- Neural Fad: AI dreams Nostalgia, "NIPPON TV IMAGINARIUM AWARD 2023" award jury presentation, organized by NIPPON TV, (December 2023, Museum of Contemporary Art Tokyo)
- "DXP2 (Digital Transformation Planet) - Toward the Next Interface" (March 2023 onwards, Kanazawa 21st Century Museum of Art)
- "Now in Digital Art: Playroom" (March 2024, Akbank Sanat)
- "Cognitive Chaos" (April 2024, Checkpoint Charlie)
- "Artificial Dreams" (May 2024, Grand Palais Immersif)
- "Kiaf SEOUL" (Sep 2024, COEX Convention & Exhibition Center)
- "ART OF PUNK" (January 2025, Museum Francisco Carolinum)
- "Artificial Dreams" (Oct 2024, MEET Digital Culture Centure, Milan)

== Discography ==
- "Glass Ceiling" (October, 2020)
- "Love is an IPO" (March, 2021)

== Filmography and performance ==
=== Brand Collaboration ===
- Adidas Original fall/winter edition "adicolor WINTER x HOME", Key visuals for in-store and web advertising across Japan
- Santen Pharmaceutical, Sante PC, TV ad appearance
- Adobe Premiere Rush CC web as appearance and theme song
- Google Pixel Buds in-store ad appearance and theme song

=== Appearance ===
Television

- SENSORS (April 18, 2018 -, BS NTV, regular appearance as an assistant MC)
- Reiwa Net Theory "NFT & Metaverse" (March 2022, 19, NHK E Tele, studio appearance)
- Reiwa Net Theory 10min. "Change with NFT! Art & Entertainment" (March 19, 2022, NHK E-tele, appeared as a lecturer and MC)
- Reiwa Net Theory "WEB3 Part 1" (June 2022, 25, NHK E Tele, studio appearance)
- Reiwa Net Theory "WEB3 Part 2" (July 2022, 1, NHK E Tele, studio appearance)
- Sukkiri (From July 29, 2022, NTV, regular appearance as a commentator)

Radio and Podcast

- Audible Original Technolo-Juku (November 2023, -, Amazon Audible, MC)

Newspaper

- Japan Times (March, 2017)
- Nikkei (March, 2018)
- WWD JAPAN (June, 2023, Cover)
