= Mitch Murder =

Swedish electronic musician (born 1980)

- Also known as: Stratos Zero
- Born: Johan Bengtsson; 1980 (age 45–46)
- Origin: Stockholm, Sweden
- Genres: Synthwave; electronic; drum and bass
- Occupation: Music producer
- Years active: 2009–present
- Labels: Mad Decent; Rosso Corsa; Universal
- Website: mitchmurder.bandcamp.com

Johan Bengtsson (born Sept 1, 1980), known under his stage name Mitch Murder, is a Swedish electronic musician from Stockholm, known as one of the many artists that popularized the synthwave genre. His first EP, After Hours, was released in 2009, followed by Current Events and Burning Chrome on Rosso Corsa Records in 2010 and 2011, respectively.

== Influences and style ==
Bengtsson explained in an interview on his inspirations being "jazz, cheesy 1950s bossa nova, 1970s motown or 1980s pop", and mentioned Paul Hardcastle, Jan Hammer, and Vince DiCola as examples. His primary software for music is the tracker program Renoise.

== Collaboration ==
In 2013, he was contacted by director David Sandberg regarding his film project Kung Fury, where he would compose the majority of the music. Prior to the movie's release, he collaborated with David Hasselhoff for the single True Survivor. Both the single's music video and the movie went viral upon their releases, gaining considerable acclaim. In 2014, he released his third album Interceptor on Mad Decent.

== Discography ==
=== Albums ===
- Burning Chrome (October 2010, Rosso Corsa Records)
- Current Events (November 2011, Rosso Corsa Records)
- Interceptor (July 2014, Mad Decent)
- Then Again (23 April, 2021, Mad Decent)

=== EPs ===
- After Hours (September 2009)
- Television (March 2010, Karakasa Music)
- This is Now (February 2011)
- Elevator Music (February 2011)
- High Plains Drifter (Michel Meurtre) (April 2012)
- MARS (June 2012)
- Glass Cities (September 2012, Dharma Records)
- Mitch Murder vs. Mega Man (October 2012)
- SPRAWL OST (September 2012)
- Planet V (Stratos Zero) (December 2012)
- The Touch (June 2013, Mad Decent)
- Descent (Stratos Zero) (August 2013)
- Another Place (October 2013)
- The Real Deal (October 2016)
- Strike Zero OST (August 2017)
- Instances (Stratos Zero) (January 2018)
- Hardwired (November 2018)
- Salary Man Simulator OST (December 2019)
- Artifact (December 2020)
- Salary Man Simulator 2 OST (February 2021)
- Salary Man Simulator 3 OST (December 2021)

=== Compilations ===
- Selection 1 (December 2012)
- Selection 2 (March 2014)
- Selection 3 (May 2015)
- Selection 4 (December 2016)
- Selection 5 (September 2018)
- Selection 6 (July 2022)

=== Singles ===
- Mirage (May 2013)
- Just till Midnight (feat. Miranda Carey) (December 2013)
- Ocean Avenue (May 2014)
- Breeze (August 2014, Mad Decent)
- Savage (October 2014)
- True Survivor (with David Hasselhoff) (May 2015)
- Sniper Rouge (feat. Satellite Young) (February 2016)
- Story Mode (August 2016)
- Lit (September 2016)
- Turning Point (February 2017)
- Of Below (October 2017)
- Taken (October 2017)

=== Soundtracks ===
- Mega64: KUTARAGI'S WAY (March 2014)
- The Video Craze (July 2014)
- Hotline Miami 2: Wrong Number (March 2015)
- Kung Fury (July 2015)
- Kung Fury: Street Rage (July 2015)
- The Suicide Theory (July 2015)
- Kung Fury (Lost Tapes) (August 2015)
- Megamagic - Wizards of the Neon Age (April 2016)
- Impact Winter (May 2018)
- City Wars: Tokyo Reign (April 2022)
- Scrap Mechanic: Drilling Thunder (July 2026)
