= Highway Superstar =

Israeli musician

Alex Karlinsky (known under his stage name Highway Superstar) is an Israeli record producer of synthwave music. Having been raised in the 1980s, Karlinsky says Highway Superstar is his attempt to recreate musical elements from the period, while combining them with modern production techniques and soundscapes. After several internet singles between 2012 and 2013, a full album was released via the USA/Canadian label Rosso Corsa Records. His track "Careful Shouting" was featured in the 2015 short film Kung Fury. A sophomore album titled Endgame was released in 2015. The 2015 album by The Fading features Karlinsky's synth playing.

Karlinsky is also active in the Israeli music scene as a session keyboard player, arranger, producer, mixing and mastering engineer.

== Discography ==
=== Singles ===
- Whistling Shurikens (2012)
- Emotional Passenger (2012)
- The Chase (2013)
- The Road to Alpha Centauri (2013)
- Aftershock (with Amazing Police) (2013)
- Empathy (2015)
- Minds to Rest (feat. Honey Colonna) (2015)
- Splash (2017)
- Eurodrive (2017)

=== Albums ===
Title	Album details
Take My Time	Released: 21 December 2013; Label: Rosso Corsa Records; Format: Audio Cassette, digital download
Endgame	Released: 11 November 2015; Label: Rosso Corsa Records; Format: digital download
Contraband	Released: 19 November 2021; Label: Rosso Corsa Records; Format: digital download
