= Kung Fury =

2015 martial arts comedy featurette by David Sandberg

- Theatrical release poster
- Directed by: David Sandberg
- Written by: David Sandberg
- Produced by: Linus Andersson; Eleni Young Antonia
- Starring: David Sandberg; Jorma Taccone; Leopold Nilsson; Eleni Young; Helene Ahlson; Andreas Cahling; Per-Henrik Arvidius; Steven Chew; Magnus Betnér; Björn Gustafsson; David Hasselhoff
- Cinematography: Matias Andersson; Jonas Ernhill; Martin Gäardeman
- Edited by: Nils Moström
- Music by: Mitch Murder; Lost Years
- Production companies: Lampray; Laser Unicorns
- Distributed by: Moving Sweden
- Release dates: 22 May 2015 (Cannes); 28 May 2015 (El Rey Network)
- Running time: 31 minutes
- Country: Sweden
- Language: English
- Budget: US$630,019

Kung Fury is a 2015 English-language Swedish martial arts comedy featurette film written and directed by David Sandberg. It pays homage to 1980s martial arts and police action films. The film stars Sandberg in the title role, Jorma Taccone, Leopold Nilsson, and a cameo appearance by David Hasselhoff.

The film was crowdfunded through Kickstarter in the beginning of 2014, with pledges reaching US$630,019, exceeding the original target goal of $200,000, but short of the feature film goal of $1 million. It was selected to screen in the Directors' Fortnight section at the 2015 Cannes Film Festival, losing to Rate Me from the United Kingdom.

== Plot ==
In 1985, Miami-Dade Police Department detective Kung Fury and his partner Dragon apprehend a red ninja in a back alley, but Dragon is sliced in half by the ninja while Kung Fury is suddenly struck by lightning and bitten by a cobra, giving him extraordinary kung fu powers that enable him to defeat his foe. After defeating a rogue arcade machine robot, Kung Fury quits the force when he is assigned to partner with Triceracop, fearing that he would lose another partner in the line of duty. Meanwhile, Adolf Hitler, a.k.a. "Kung Führer", enters the timeline and remotely guns down the police chief and attacks the precinct through a mobile phone. Intent on avenging the chief, Kung Fury has computer whiz Hackerman send him back in time to kill Hitler in Nazi Germany. A glitch in the system, however, sends him back into the Viking Age. After Kung Fury meets the Viking valkyries Barbarianna and Katana, the Norse god Thor sends him to Nazi Germany for him to finish his job.

Upon his arrival, Kung Fury singlehandedly mows down dozens of Nazi soldiers with his kung fu skills, but is gunned down by Hitler using a Gatling-type gun from inside his podium. Suddenly, Thor, Hackerman, Triceracop, the Viking valkyries, and a tyrannosaurus hack into the timeline and kill the rest of the Nazi army while the tyrannosaurus squares off against Hitler's robotic Reichsadler. After being revived by Hackerman, Kung Fury gives Hitler an uppercut to the groin before Thor drops his hammer on the Nazi leader and his robotic eagle. Seeing his mission as accomplished, Kung Fury returns to his timeline.

Back in 1985 Miami, Kung Fury once again battles and defeats the arcade machine robot, but notices a swastika on the robot's body while Hitler and his Reichsadler enter the timeline, vowing revenge on Kung Fury.

== Cast ==
- David Sandberg as Kung Fury, a Miami detective who possesses a new and powerful form of kung fu after being struck by lightning and bitten by a cobra, thus becoming "The Chosen One" as foretold by an ancient prophecy
- Jorma Taccone as Adolf Hitler, a.k.a. "Kung Führer", who aims to become the greatest martial artist by traveling through time to kill "The Chosen One"
- Steven Chew as Dragon, Kung Fury's partner who is killed by a red ninja
- Leopold Nilsson as Hackerman, a computer whiz who can transform into a Hackerbot
- Andreas Cahling as Thor (voiced by Per-Henrik Arvidius), the Norse god of thunder
- Erik Hornqvist as Triceracop (voiced by Frank Sanderson), a half-man, half-Triceratops cop who is assigned as Kung Fury's new partner
- Per-Henrik Arvidius as Chief
- Eleni Young as Barbarianna, a Viking warrior who rides a giant wolf and wields a Minigun
- Helene Ahlson as Katana (voiced by Yasmina Suhonen), a Viking warrior who rides a talking Tyrannosaurus and uses an Uzi
- Eos Karlsson as the Red Ninja
- Magnus Betnér as Colonel Reichstache
- Björn Gustafsson as Private Lahmstache
- David Hasselhoff as Hoff 9000 (voice)
- Frank Sanderson as Cobra (voice), Kung Fury's spirit animal; and Dinomite (voice), Katana's pet Tyrannosaurus

== Production ==
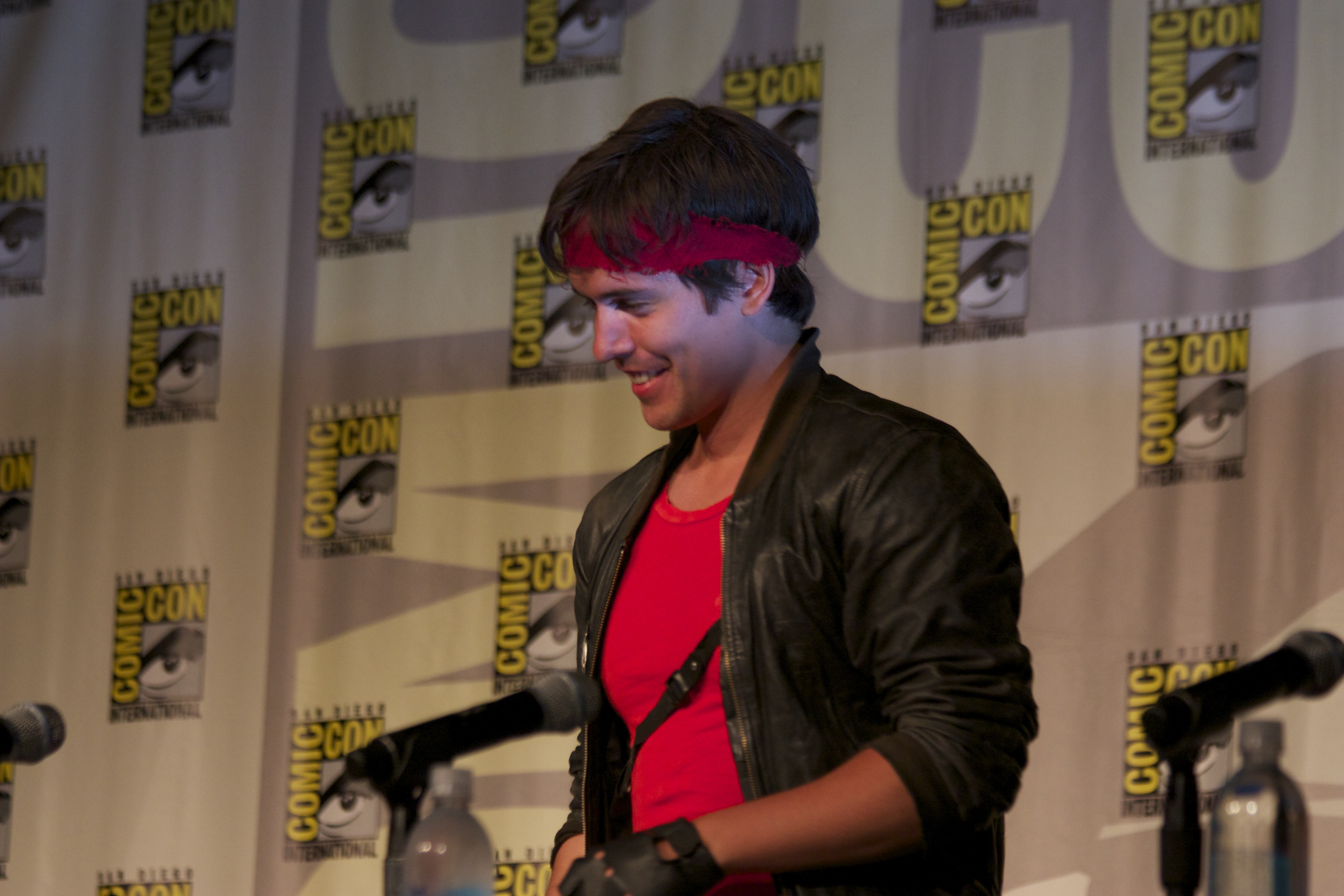
Director David Sandberg dressed as Kung Fury at the 2015 Comic-Con International.

David Sandberg is a Swedish filmmaker who had previously directed television commercials and music videos. In 2012, he quit the commercial directing business and focused on writing a script for an action comedy film set in the 1980s, inspired by action films of that era. He initially spent US$5,000 on producing and shooting footage with his friends, which became the trailer.

In December 2013, Sandberg released the trailer and began a Kickstarter campaign to crowdfund the film's production with the goal of raising US$200,000 to produce a 30-minute version of the film and stream it online for free. A second goal was added with the target set to $1 million to rewrite the story into a full-length feature and a possible distribution deal. Most of the raw footage over green screen had been filmed using a Canon EOS 5D Mark III and a Sony FS700, but additional funding was required for post-production.

The Kickstarter project ended on 25 January 2014, with $630,019 pledged by 17,713 backers.

=== Filming ===
Due to a limited budget, Sandberg shot the majority of the film at his office in Umeå, Sweden, using digital effects to replicate the streets of Miami. As he could only afford one police uniform during the production of the trailer, he filmed the police precinct scene by shooting each extra separately and compositing them in the scene. The single-shot scene where Kung Fury dispatches dozens of Nazi soldiers was achieved by combining the primary take of Sandberg's moves with over 60 takes of individual extras attacking him.

On 30 July 2014, Sandberg announced that he and his crew had begun filming new footage, with the 30 backers who pledged to be in the film as extras. Filming was also done in Stockholm for additional scenes and stunts. For the scene with Barbarianna riding a giant wolf, Sandberg used stock footage of a black wolf from the website GreenScreen Animals, as sourcing a real wolf was impossible in Sweden. Miniatures were used in Kung Fury's fight scenes involving the arcade machine robot and the Red Ninja. The animated "Heaven" sequence was produced by French video game developer Old Skull Games.

In keeping with the film's '80s theme, the visual effects artists softened the film clarity and added videotape wear effects to give the illusion of it being a worn VHS copy being played on an old VCR. One instance of this effect is in the scene where the Viking Babe Katana summons Thor. The scene was in the trailer with Joanna Häggblom originally as Katana, but because Häggblom was replaced by Helene Ahlson for the actual film, visual scratches and distortion effects were added to the scene to mask the cast change.

=== Music ===
The soundtrack score was composed by Swedish synthwave musicians Mitch Murder and Lost Years, with additional music by Patrik Öberg, Christoffer Ling, Highway Superstar, and Betamaxx. The official soundtrack album was released on vinyl record on 8 July 2015. Mitch Murder and Jörgen Elofsson also co wrote the original song "True Survivor" for the film, which was performed by David Hasselhoff.

== Release ==
The film made its debut at the 2015 Cannes Film Festival and premiered on YouTube, Steam, SVT2 in Sweden, and the El Rey Network in the United States, on 28 May 2015. By 1 June, the film had received over 10 million views on YouTube. As of 15 June 2026, the video has scored over 41 million views on YouTube. The film has also been made available on VoD platforms through a distribution deal with Under the Milky Way.

== Reception ==
=== Critical response ===
Kung Fury was met with positive reviews from critics. Tyler Richardson of Latino-Review gave the film an A, commenting that "What Black Dynamite got so perfect about Blaxploitation films, this does wonderfully for 80s cop movies." Jonny Bunning of Bloody Disgusting gave the film a score of three-and-a-half out of five skulls, saying that "Kung Fury is The Avengers if it had been made in the 90s."

Todd Brown of Twitch Film also praised the film, calling it "a thirty-minute long, nonstop assault of some of the most astounding visual gags ever assembled in one place. Kung Fury knows its audience, knows it damn well, and while it has little to offer to anyone outside of its particular niche, for people within that niche this is absolute gold." Scott Weinberg of Nerdist Industries called it "a 31-minute masterpiece that feels like it fell right out of 1985 and hit just about every awesome b-movie genre on the way down." Melissa Locker of Vanity Fair praised the film, jokingly calling it "the best movie ever, of course."

=== Accolades ===
Kung Fury received the following awards and nominations:

- Mexico City International Contemporary Film Festival - Best Film - Won
- Guldbagge Awards - Best Short Film - Won
- Cannes Film Festival - Directors' Fortnight (Short Film) - Nominated
- Empire Awards - Best Short Film - Nominated
- European Film Awards - European Short Film - Nominated

== Video game ==
Kung Fury: Street Rage is the companion video game to the film published by Hello There AB released in June 2015, paying homage to classic beat 'em up games such as Streets of Rage, Double Dragon, and Final Fight. The gameplay also resembles One Finger Death Punch by Silver Dollar Games, with the player pressing left or right of the character to attack in either direction.

It was released in 2015 for Windows and macOS via Steam.

An upgraded version of the game, titled Kung Fury: Street Rage - The Arcade Strikes Back, was released on PlayStation 4 and Windows in December 2015. The game features additional boss fights and enables players to fight as Kung Fury's allies Triceracop, Barbarianna, and Hackerman. Another expansion DLC, titled A Day at the Beach, was released on Windows and macOS in November 2021. The updates features a new story, Co-op mode and a new playable character as David Hasselhoff. In 2021 the game was made available as DLC for arcade management game Arcade Paradise, sold as DLC. The game is playable once the appropriate cabinet has been placed in the arcade.

== Sequel ==
On 28 May 2016, it was announced on the Laser Unicorns Facebook page that a sequel to Kung Fury was in development.

Sandberg worked with producers Seth Grahame-Smith and David Katzenberg on a full-length feature film version of Kung Fury. In an interview with Entertainment Weekly, he stated that the project would be a "clean slate", containing no footage from the short film but taking place in the same universe. In February 2018, Michael Fassbender and Arnold Schwarzenegger were confirmed to star alongside Hasselhoff in the upcoming film. On 16 May 2019, it was announced that Creasun Entertainment USA purchased a majority stake in the film's rights and co-produced it with Argent Pictures. Filming commenced on 29 July 2019 in Bulgaria and Germany. On 13 September 2019, Schwarzenegger confirmed the film's title as Kung Fury 2, that he would portray the President of the United States, and that filming was to begin that day. On 25 September, the official Laser Unicorns Instagram page confirmed that Kung Fury 2 had wrapped filming. The film was intended for release in 2022, but its release date was rescheduled to November 17, 2023. The release of the film continued to be delayed, however, due to lawsuits involving unpaid funds from a major investor of the project which caused post-production to shut down.

== See also ==
- Commando Ninja
- Turbo Kid
